= 1930–31 Philadelphia Quakers season =

National Hockey League team season

1930–31 Philadelphia Quakers
- Division: 5th American
- 1930–31 record: 4–36–4
- Home record: 3–17–2
- Road record: 1–19–2
- Goals for: 76
- Goals against: 184

Team information
- General manager: Cooper Smeaton
- Coach: Cooper Smeaton
- Captain: Hib Milks
- Arena: Philadelphia Arena
- Average attendance: 2,500

Team leaders
- Goals: Hib Milks (18)
- Assists: Gerry Lowrey (14)
- Points: Gerry Lowrey (26)
- Penalty minutes: D'Arcy Coulson (103)
- Wins: Wilf Cude (2); Joe Miller (2)
- Goals against average: Joe Miller (3.43)

The 1930–31 Philadelphia Quakers season was the Quakers' sole season in the National Hockey League (NHL). The team moved from Pittsburgh, where they had played as the Pittsburgh Pirates since 1925.

== Offseason ==
The team relocated to Philadelphia and was in the charge of Benny Leonard, the prizefighter who held the world lightweight title from 1917 to 1925.

On October 18, 1930, 13 players, including player-coach Frank Fredrickson, were transferred to the Quakers from Pittsburgh. But Fredrickson was released two days later and replaced by Cooper Smeaton, who resigned his position as the league's referee-in-chief to become the Quakers head coach.

== Regular season ==
The team finished with 12 points for the season, the worst performance in the six-year history of the Pirate/Quaker franchise. The team lost $100,000 on its operations and folded after the season. As a result, Philadelphia was left without an NHL franchise until the Flyers arrived in 1967.

=== Season standings ===
American Division
	GP	W	L	T	GF	GA	PTS
**Boston Bruins**	44	28	10	6	143	90	62
**Chicago Black Hawks**	44	24	17	3	108	78	51
**New York Rangers**	44	19	16	9	106	87	47
Detroit Falcons	44	16	21	7	102	105	39
Philadelphia Quakers	44	4	36	4	76	184	12

Note: GP = Games Played, W = Wins, L = Losses, T = Ties, Pts = Points, GF = Goals For, GA = Goals Against
Teams that qualified for the playoffs are highlighted in bold.

=== Record vs. opponents ===
==== Vs. American Division ====
1930–31 NHL records
Team	**BOS**	**CHI**	**DET**	**NYR**	**PHI**	**Total**
Boston	—	2–4	4–1–1	4–0–2	5–0–1	**15–5–4**
Chicago	4–2	—	2–3–1	4–1–1	6–0	**16–6–2**
Detroit	1–4–1	3–2–1	—	2–3–1	4–2	**10–11–3**
N.Y. Rangers	0–4–2	1–4–1	3–2–1	—	6–0	**10–10–4**
Philadelphia	0–5–1	0–6	2–4	0–6	—	**2–21–1**

==== Vs. Canadian Division ====
1930–31 NHL records
Team	**MTL**	**MTM**	**NYA**	**OTT**	**TOR**	**Total**
Boston	1–2–1	3–1	2–2	4–0	2–1–1	**12–6–2**
Chicago	0–3–1	0–4	3–1	4–0	0–4	**7–12–1**
Detroit	2–2	0–3–1	0–2–2	2–2	2–1–1	**6–10–4**
N.Y. Rangers	2–2	2–1–1	1–0–3	3–1	1–2–1	**9–6–5**
Philadelphia	0–3–1	1–3	0–3–1	0–3–1	1–3	**2–15–3**

== Schedule and results ==
1930–31 regular season
November: 1–5–1, 3 points (home: 1–2–1; road: 0–3–0)

Game	Date	Score	Opponent	Decision	Attendance	Record	Points	Recap
1	November 11	0–3	New York Rangers	Miller	5,000	0–1–0	0	L
2	November 15	0–4	@ Toronto Maple Leafs	Miller	6,000	0–2–0	0	L
3	November 16	1–5	@ Detroit Falcons	Miller	7,500	0–3–0	0	L
4	November 18	2–2 OT	Ottawa Senators	Miller	2,000	0–3–1	1	T
5	November 23	2–5	@ New York Rangers	Miller	9,000	0–4–1	1	L
6	November 25	2–1	Toronto Maple Leafs	Miller	3,500	1–4–1	3	W
7	November 29	3–6	New York Rangers	Miller	2,500	1–5–1	3	L

December: 0–10–0, 0 points (home: 0–5–0; road: 0–5–0)

Game	Date	Score	Opponent	Decision	Attendance	Record	Points	Recap
8	December 2	0–2	Montreal Canadiens	Miller	4,000	1–6–1	3	L
9	December 4	2–5	@ Ottawa Senators	Miller	4,000	1–7–1	3	L
10	December 6	3–4	Boston Bruins	Miller	5,000	1–8–1	3	L
11	December 9	1–2 OT	New York Americans	Miller	3,000	1–9–1	3	L
12	December 13	2–3	Detroit Falcons	Miller	5,000	1–10–1	3	L
13	December 16	0–3	@ New York Americans	Miller	5,000	1–11–1	3	L
14	December 20	1–5	@ Montreal Maroons	Miller	9,000	1–12–1	3	L
15	December 23	2–3	Chicago Black Hawks	Cude	2,000	1–13–1	3	L
16	December 25	0–8	@ Boston Bruins	Cude	11,000	1–14–1	3	L
17	December 28	2–4	@ New York Rangers	Cude	7,000	1–15–1	3	L

January: 1–11–1, 3 points (home: 1–5–0; road: 0–6–1)

Game	Date	Score	Opponent	Decision	Attendance	Record	Points	Recap
18	January 1	3–10	@ Chicago Black Hawks	Cude	7,000	1–16–1	3	L
19	January 3	4–5 OT	Ottawa Senators	Cude	3,500	1–17–1	3	L
20	January 4	0–5	@ New York Americans	Cude	7,000	1–18–1	3	L
21	January 8	0–4	Chicago Black Hawks	Cude	n/a	1–19–1	3	L
22	January 10	4–3 OT	Montreal Maroons	Miller	3,000	2–19–1	5	W
23	January 13	1–2	Montreal Canadiens	Forbes	3,500	2–20–1	5	L
24	January 17	2–5	Detroit Falcons	Forbes	2,500	2–21–1	5	L
25	January 20	2–5	@ Detroit Falcons	Cude	6,000	2–22–1	5	L
26	January 22	2–5	@ Chicago Black Hawks	Cude	6,500	2–23–1	5	L
27	January 24	2–4	Boston Bruins	Cude	3,500	2–24–1	5	L
28	January 27	3–3 OT	@ Boston Bruins	Cude	n/a	2–24–2	6	T
29	January 29	1–7	@ Montreal Canadiens	Cude	10,000	2–25–2	6	L
30	January 31	2–3	@ Toronto Maple Leafs	Cude	7,000	2–26–2	6	L

February: 1–5–1, 3 points (home: 0–2–1; road: 1–3–0)

Game	Date	Score	Opponent	Decision	Attendance	Record	Points	Recap
31	February 5	1–6	@ Chicago Black Hawks	Cude	8,000	2–27–2	6	L
32	February 10	1–3	New York Rangers	Cude	n/a	2–28–2	6	L
33	February 14	1–1 OT	New York Americans	Cude	3,000	2–28–3	7	T
34	February 17	2–0	@ Detroit Falcons	Cude	5,000	3–28–3	9	W
35	February 22	1–6	@ New York Rangers	Cude	8,000	3–29–3	9	L
36	February 24	1–5	Boston Bruins	Cude	2,000	3–30–3	9	L
37	February 28	1–4	@ Montreal Maroons	Cude	9,500	3–31–3	9	L

March: 1–5–1, 3 points (home: 1–3–0; road: 0–2–1)

Game	Date	Score	Opponent	Decision	Attendance	Record	Points	Recap
38	March 3	1–5	Toronto Maple Leafs	Cude	1,500	3–32–3	9	L
39	March 7	2–7	@ Boston Bruins	Cude	n/a	3–33–3	9	L
40	March 10	3–5 OT	@ Ottawa Senators	Cude	2,000	3–34–3	9	L
41	March 12	7–5	Detroit Falcons	Cude	n/a	4–34–3	11	W
42	March 14	2–3	Montreal Maroons	Cude	n/a	4–35–3	11	L
43	March 17	0–4	Chicago Black Hawks	Cude	2,500	4–36–3	11	L
44	March 21	4–4	@ Montreal Canadiens	Cude	n/a	4–36–4	12	T

Legend: W Win (2 points) L Loss (0 points) T Tie (1 point)

== Player statistics ==
=== Scoring ===
- Position abbreviations: C = Center; D = Defense; F = Forward; G = Goaltender; LW = Left wing; RW = Right wing
- † = Joined team via a transaction (e.g., trade, waivers, signing) during the season. Stats reflect time with the Quakers only.
- ‡ = Left team via a transaction (e.g., trade, waivers, release) during the season. Stats reflect time with the Quakers only.

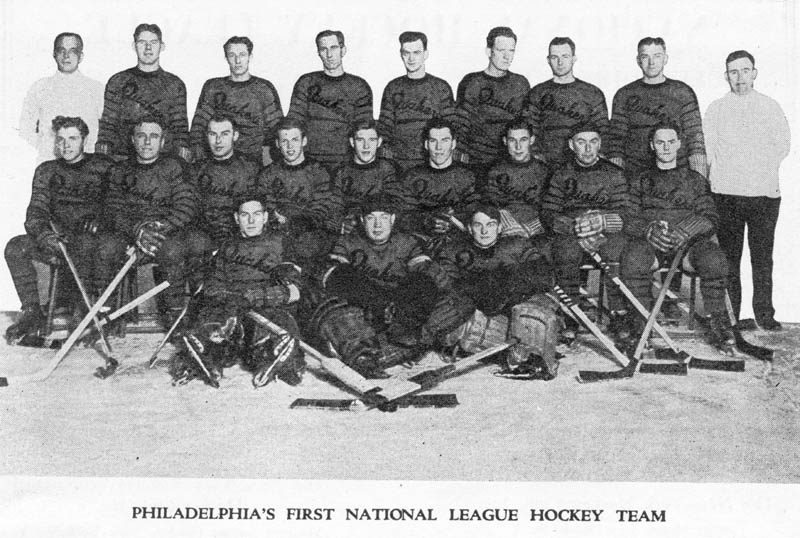
The 1930–31 Philadelphia Quakers.

No.	Player	Pos	Regular season				
No.	Player	Pos	GP	G	A	Pts	PIM
7	Gerry Lowrey	C	43	12	14	26	27
4	Hib Milks	C	44	18	6	24	42
15	Syd Howe	LW/C	44	9	11	20	22
14	Wally Kilrea	C	44	8	11	19	26
10	Cliff Barton	RW	43	6	7	13	21
5	James Jarvis	LW	44	5	7	12	32
12	Al Shields	D	43	7	4	11	102
2	Ron Lyons†‡	LW	22	2	4	6	11
17	Eddie McCalmon	RW	16	3	0	3	6
11	Tex White‡	RW	9	3	0	3	2
8	Herb Drury	LW	24	0	3	3	10
6	Harold Darragh‡	RW	10	1	1	2	4
9	John McKinnon	D	39	1	1	2	46
6	Bill Hutton†‡	RW	21	1	0	1	2
16	D'Arcy Coulson†	D	28	0	0	0	103
3	Stan Crossett†	D	21	0	0	0	10
18	Wilf Cude†	G	29	0	0	0	0
1	Jake Forbes†‡	G	2	0	0	0	0
2	Gord Fraser‡	D	5	0	0	0	29
19 (Note: Manners wore number 16 in his second game.)	Rennison Manners‡	F	4	0	0	0	0
1	Joe Miller‡	G	15	0	0	0	0
3	Rodger Smith‡	D	9	0	0	0	8
16	Aubrey Webster	F	1	0	0	0	0

=== Goaltending ===
No.	Player	Regular season							
No.	Player	GP	W	L	T	SO	GA	GAA	MIN
18	Wilf Cude†	29	2	23	3	1	130	4.38	1779
1	Joe Miller‡	15	2	11	1	0	47	3.43	821
1	Jake Forbes†‡	2	0	2	0	0	7	3.50	120

== Awards and records ==
=== Records ===
The 1930–31 Quakers are tied with the 1919–20 Quebec Bulldogs for the fewest wins in a season with four, though Quebec played 20 fewer games. The Quakers .136 points percentage on the season held the NHL record low for 44 years until being surpassed by the expansion 1974–75 Washington Capitals’ .131.

== Transactions ==
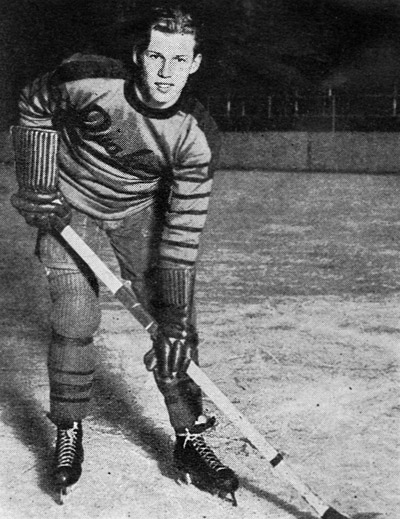
Syd Howe, seen here in a Quakers uniform during the 1930–31 season, was one of three players acquired on loan from Ottawa a few days prior to the start of the regular season.

The Quakers were involved in the following transactions before, during, and after the 1930–31 season.

=== Trades ===
Date	Details	
November 6, 1930	To Philadelphia Quakers: Loan of Syd Howe; Loan of Wally Kilrea; Loan of Al Shields	To Ottawa Senators: $35,000
November 28, 1930	To Philadelphia Quakers: cash	To Pittsburgh Yellow Jackets (IHL): Gord Fraser
December 8, 1930	To Philadelphia Quakers: Bill Hutton; Ron Lyons; cash	To Boston Bruins: Harold Darragh
December 16, 1930	To Philadelphia Quakers: cash	To Pittsburgh Yellow Jackets (IHL): Rodger Smith; Tex White
January 13, 1931	To Philadelphia Quakers: Loan of Jake Forbes	To New Haven Eagles (CAHL)
February 12, 1931	To Philadelphia Quakers: cash	To Boston Bruins: Ron Lyons
February 24, 1931	To Philadelphia Quakers: cash	To Detroit Olympics (IHL): Bill Hutton
October 19, 1933	To Philadelphia Quakers: cash	To Montreal Canadiens: Wilf Cude

=== Players acquired ===
Date	Player	Former team	Via
November 12, 1930	Aubrey Shore	Kitchener Flying Dutchmen (CPHL)	Free agency
December 15, 1930	D'Arcy Coulson	Chicago Shamrocks (AHA)	Free agency
December 15, 1930	Wilf Cude	Melville Millionaires (S-SSHL)	Free agency
December 15, 1930	Eddie McCalmon	Toronto Millionaires (IHL)	Free agency
January 9, 1931	Stan Crossett	Port Hope Eagles (OHA-Sr.)	Free agency
May 9, 1931	Doug Young	Cleveland Indians (IHL)	Inter-league draft

=== Players lost ===
Date	Player	New team	Via
October 20, 1930	Frank Fredrickson	Detroit Falcons (Note: Fredrickson signed with Detroit on November 23, 1930.)	Release
November 12, 1930	Tom Cowan		Release
November 28, 1930 (Note: Date approximated)	Rennison Manners	Niagara Falls Cataracts (OPHL) (Note: Manners played for Niagara Falls for the rest of the 1930–31 season.)	Release
February 16, 1931	Joe Miller		Release
September 26, 1931	Cliff Barton	New York Rangers	Dispersal draft
September 26, 1931	D'Arcy Coulson	Montreal Maroons	Dispersal draft
September 26, 1931	James Jarvis	New York Rangers	Dispersal draft
September 26, 1931	Gerry Lowrey	Chicago Black Hawks	Dispersal draft
September 26, 1931	Hib Milks	New York Rangers	Dispersal draft
September 26, 1931	Doug Young	New York Americans	Dispersal draft
September 27, 1931	Wilf Cude	National Hockey League	Free agency (Note: Cude was signed by the league to serve as utility back-up goaltender. His NHL rights were retained by the Quakers franchise.)

=== Signings ===
Date	Player
November 12, 1930	Gerry Lowrey
