= 1930–31 Toronto Maple Leafs season =

NHL hockey team season

1930–31 Toronto Maple Leafs
- Division: 2nd Canadian
- 1930–31 record: 22–13–9
- Home record: 15–4–3
- Road record: 7–9–6
- Goals for: 118
- Goals against: 99

Team information
- General manager: Conn Smythe
- Coach: Conn Smythe
- Captain: Hap Day
- Arena: Arena Gardens

Team leaders
- Goals: Charlie Conacher (31)
- Assists: Joe Primeau (32)
- Points: Charlie Conacher (43)
- Penalty minutes: Red Horner (71)
- Wins: Lorne Chabot (21)
- Goals against average: Lorne Chabot (2.09)

The 1930–31 Toronto Maple Leafs season was Toronto's 14th season in the National Hockey League (NHL). This was the team's last season in the old Arena Gardens, as the Maple Leafs would build Maple Leaf Gardens before the next season. The team made the playoffs for the first time since the 1928–29 season.

== Regular season ==
=== Final standings ===
Canadian Division
	GP	W	L	T	GF	GA	PTS
**Montreal Canadiens**	44	26	10	8	129	89	60
**Toronto Maple Leafs**	44	22	13	9	118	99	53
**Montreal Maroons**	44	20	18	6	105	106	46
New York Americans	44	18	16	10	76	74	46
Ottawa Senators	44	10	30	4	91	142	24

Note: W = Wins, L = Losses, T = Ties, GF = Goals For, GA = Goals Against, Pts = Points
Teams that qualified for the playoffs are highlighted in bold.

=== Record vs. opponents ===
==== Vs. Canadian Division ====
1930–31 NHL records
Team	MTL	MTM	NYA	OTT	TOR	Total
M. Canadiens	—	3–1–2	5–0–1	5–0–1	3–2–1	**16–3–5**
M. Maroons	1–3–2	—	1–5	4–1–1	2–3–1	**8–13–4**
N.Y. Americans	0–5–1	5–1	—	4–2	1–2–3	**10–10–4**
Ottawa	0–5–1	1–4–1	2–4	—	1–4–1	**4–17–3**
Toronto	2–3–1	3–2–1	2–1–3	4–1–1	—	**11–7–6**

==== Vs. American Division ====
1930–31 NHL records
Team	BOS	CHI	DET	NYR	PHI	Total
M. Canadiens	2–1–1	3–0–1	2–2	2–2	3–0–1	**12–5–3**
M. Maroons	1–3	4–0	3–0–1	1–2–1	3–1	**12–6–2**
N.Y. Americans	2–2	1–3	2–0–2	0–1–3	3–0–1	**8–6–6**
Ottawa	0–4	0–4	2–2	1–3	3–0–1	**6–13–1**
Toronto	1–2–1	4–0	1–2–1	2–1–1	3–1	**11–6–3**

== Schedule and results ==
1930–31 regular season
November

Game	Result	Date	Score	Opponent	Record
1	T	November 13, 1930	0–0 OT	New York Americans (1930–31)	0–0–1
2	W	November 15, 1930	4–0	Philadelphia Quakers (1930–31)	1–0–1
3	W	November 18, 1930	3–0	@ Montreal Maroons (1930–31)	2–0–1
4	T	November 20, 1930	0–0 OT	@ New York Americans (1930–31)	2–0–2
5	W	November 22, 1930	2–0	Ottawa Senators (1930–31)	3–0–2
6	L	November 25, 1930	1–2	@ Philadelphia Quakers (1930–31)	3–1–2
7	W	November 29, 1930	4–2	Detroit Falcons (1930–31)	4–1–2

December

Game	Result	Date	Score	Opponent	Record
8	L	December 2, 1930	2–3	@ Boston Bruins (1930–31)	4–2–2
9	W	December 6, 1930	4–2	New York Rangers (1930–31)	5–2–2
10	L	December 9, 1930	1–2	@ Montreal Canadiens (1930–31)	5–3–2
11	L	December 13, 1930	3–7	Boston Bruins (1930–31)	5–4–2
12	L	December 18, 1930	1–2	Montreal Maroons (1930–31)	5–5–2
13	W	December 20, 1930	3–1	Chicago Black Hawks (1930–31)	6–5–2
14	T	December 23, 1930	4–4 OT	@ Montreal Maroons (1930–31)	6–5–3
15	L	December 25, 1930	1–10	@ Detroit Falcons (1930–31)	6–6–3
16	W	December 28, 1930	3–2	@ Chicago Black Hawks (1930–31)	7–6–3

January

Game	Result	Date	Score	Opponent	Record
17	W	January 1, 1931	2–0	New York Americans (1930–31)	8–6–3
18	W	January 3, 1931	2–1	Montreal Canadiens (1930–31)	9–6–3
19	T	January 6, 1931	2–2 OT	@ Ottawa Senators (1930–31)	9–6–4
20	W	January 8, 1931	1–0	Montreal Maroons (1930–31)	10–6–4
21	L	January 10, 1931	1–6	@ Montreal Canadiens (1930–31)	10–7–4
22	T	January 15, 1931	1–1 OT	@ New York Rangers (1930–31)	10–7–5
23	W	January 17, 1931	3–1	Montreal Canadiens (1930–31)	11–7–5
24	W	January 22, 1931	4–2	@ Montreal Maroons (1930–31)	12–7–5
25	W	January 24, 1931	5–2	Ottawa Senators (1930–31)	13–7–5
26	L	January 27, 1931	2–3	@ New York Americans (1930–31)	13–8–5
27	W	January 29, 1931	3–2	@ Ottawa Senators (1930–31)	14–8–5
28	W	January 31, 1931	3–2	Philadelphia Quakers (1930–31)	15–8–5

February

Game	Result	Date	Score	Opponent	Record
29	L	February 1, 1931	0–2	@ Detroit Falcons (1930–31)	15–9–5
30	L	February 3, 1931	1–2	@ Montreal Canadiens (1930–31)	15–10–5
31	W	February 7, 1931	2–0	New York Americans (1930–31)	16–10–5
32	T	February 14, 1931	1–1 OT	Detroit Falcons (1930–31)	16–10–6
33	L	February 19, 1931	1–2	Ottawa Senators (1930–31)	16–11–6
34	W	February 21, 1931	4–2	Boston Bruins (1930–31)	17–11–6
35	T	February 24, 1931	1–1 OT	@ New York Americans (1930–31)	17–11–7
36	L	February 26, 1931	1–4	@ New York Rangers (1930–31)	17–12–7
37	T	February 28, 1931	5–5 OT	Montreal Canadiens (1930–31)	17–12–8

March

Game	Result	Date	Score	Opponent	Record
38	W	March 3, 1931	5–1	@ Philadelphia Quakers (1930–31)	18–12–8
39	L	March 5, 1931	5–6	Montreal Maroons (1930–31)	18–13–8
40	W	March 7, 1931	5–2	New York Rangers (1930–31)	19–13–8
41	T	March 10, 1931	3–3 OT	@ Boston Bruins (1930–31)	19–13–9
42	W	March 15, 1931	2–1	@ Chicago Black Hawks (1930–31)	20–13–9
43	W	March 19, 1931	8–2	Chicago Black Hawks (1930–31)	21–13–9
44	W	March 21, 1931	9–6	@ Ottawa Senators (1930–31)	22–13–9

Legend: Win (2 points) Loss (0 points) Tie (1 point)

== Playoffs ==
The Maple Leafs were defeated by the Chicago Black Hawks in a two-game total goal series, g 4–3.

== Player statistics ==
=== Regular season ===
Scoring

Player	Pos	GP	G	A	Pts	PIM
Charlie Conacher	RW	37	31	12	43	78
Ace Bailey	RW	40	23	19	42	46
Joe Primeau	C	38	9	32	41	18
Busher Jackson	LW	43	18	13	31	81
Baldy Cotton	LW	43	12	17	29	45
King Clancy	D	44	7	14	21	63
Andy Blair	C	44	11	8	19	32
Hap Day	D	44	1	13	14	56
Red Horner	D	42	1	11	12	71
Bob Gracie	C/LW	8	4	2	6	4
Rolly Huard	C	1	1	0	1	0
Alex Levinsky	D	8	0	1	1	2
Lorne Chabot	G	37	0	0	0	0
Art Duncan	D	2	0	0	0	0
Babe Dye	RW	6	0	0	0	0
Benny Grant	G	7	0	0	0	0
Herbert Hamel	RW	2	0	0	0	4
Roger Jenkins	RW/D	21	0	0	0	12

Goaltending

Player	MIN	GP	W	L	T	GA	GAA	SO
Lorne Chabot	2300	37	21	8	8	80	2.09	6
Benny Grant	430	7	1	5	1	19	2.65	2
Team:	2730	44	22	13	9	99	2.18	8

=== Playoffs ===
Scoring

Player	Pos	GP	G	A	Pts	PIM
Hap Day	D	2	0	3	3	7
Ace Bailey	RW	2	1	1	2	0
Andy Blair	C	2	1	0	1	0
King Clancy	D	2	1	0	1	0
Charlie Conacher	RW	2	0	1	1	0
Lorne Chabot	G	2	0	0	0	0
Baldy Cotton	LW	2	0	0	0	2
Art Duncan	D	1	0	0	0	0
Bob Gracie	C/LW	2	0	0	0	0
Red Horner	D	2	0	0	0	4
Busher Jackson	LW	2	0	0	0	0
Alex Levinsky	D	2	0	0	0	0
Joe Primeau	C	2	0	0	0	0

Goaltending

Player	MIN	GP	W	L	GA	GAA	SO
Lorne Chabot	139	2	0	1	4	1.73	0
Team:	139	2	0	1	4	1.73	0

Note:

Pos = Position;GP = Games played; G = Goals; A = Assists; Pts = Points; PIM = Penalty minutes; +/- = Plus/minus; PPG = Power-play goals; SHG = Short-handed goals; GWG = Game-winning goals
Pos = Position;GP = Games played; Min, TOI = Minutes played; W = Wins; L = Losses; T,T/OT = Ties; OTL = Overtime losses; GA = Goals-against; GAA = Goals-against average; SO = Shutouts; SA = Shots against; SV = Shots saved;SV% = Save percentage;

== Transactions ==
- July 30, 1930: Signed Free Agent John Gallagher
- October 30, 1930: Acquired King Clancy from the Ottawa Senators for Art Smith, Eric Pettinger, and $35,000
- December 4, 1930: Loaned Roger Jenkins from the Chicago Black Hawks
- December 8, 1930: Released Babe Dye
- December 8, 1930: Signed Free Agent Herb Hamel
- December 26, 1930: Loaned Benny Grant to the Boston Tigers of the Can-Am League for cash
- February 3, 1931: Returned Roger Jenkins to the Chicago Black Hawks
- February 27, 1931: Signed Free Agent Bob Gracie
- March 2, 1931: Signed Free Agent Alex Levinsky

== See also ==
- 1930–31 NHL season
