= 1930–31 Montreal Maroons season =

National Hockey League team season

1930–31 Montreal Maroons
- Division: 3rd Canadian
- 1930–31 record: 20–18–6
- Home record: 13–5–4
- Road record: 7–13–2
- Goals for: 105
- Goals against: 106

Team information
- Coach: Dunc Munro; Georges Boucher
- Captain: Nels Stewart
- Arena: Montreal Forum

Team leaders
- Goals: Nels Stewart (25)
- Assists: Hooley Smith; Nels Stewart (14)
- Points: Nels Stewart (39)
- Penalty minutes: Babe Siebert (78)
- Wins: Dave Kerr (14)
- Goals against average: Dave Kerr; Flat Walsh (2.33)

The 1930–31 Montreal Maroons season was the seventh season for the National Hockey League (NHL) franchise.

== Regular season ==
=== Final standings ===
Canadian Division
	GP	W	L	T	GF	GA	PTS
**Montreal Canadiens**	44	26	10	8	129	89	60
**Toronto Maple Leafs**	44	22	13	9	118	99	53
**Montreal Maroons**	44	20	18	6	105	106	46
New York Americans	44	18	16	10	76	74	46
Ottawa Senators	44	10	30	4	91	142	24

Note: W = Wins, L = Losses, T = Ties, GF = Goals For, GA = Goals Against, Pts = Points
Teams that qualified for the playoffs are highlighted in bold.

=== Record vs. opponents ===
==== Vs. Canadian Division ====
1930–31 NHL records
Team	**MTL**	**MTM**	**NYA**	**OTT**	**TOR**	**Total**
M. Canadiens	—	3–1–2	5–0–1	5–0–1	3–2–1	**16–3–5**
M. Maroons	1–3–2	—	1–5	4–1–1	2–3–1	**8–13–4**
N.Y. Americans	0–5–1	5–1	—	4–2	1–2–3	**10–10–4**
Ottawa	0–5–1	1–4–1	2–4	—	1–4–1	**4–17–3**
Toronto	2–3–1	3–2–1	2–1–3	4–1–1	—	**11–7–6**

==== Vs. American Division ====
1930–31 NHL records
Team	**BOS**	**CHI**	**DET**	**NYR**	**PHI**	**Total**
M. Canadiens	2–1–1	3–0–1	2–2	2–2	3–0–1	**12–5–3**
M. Maroons	1–3	4–0	3–0–1	1–2–1	3–1	**12–6–2**
N.Y. Americans	2–2	1–3	2–0–2	0–1–3	3–0–1	**8–6–6**
Ottawa	0–4	0–4	2–2	1–3	3–0–1	**6–13–1**
Toronto	1–2–1	4–0	1–2–1	2–1–1	3–1	**11–6–3**

== Schedule and results ==
1930–31 regular season
November

Game	Result	Date	Score	Opponent	Record
1	L	November 11, 1930	0–2	@ Ottawa Senators (1930–31)	0–1–0
2	L	November 16, 1930	0–1	@ New York Americans (1930–31)	0–2–0
3	L	November 18, 1930	0–3	Toronto Maple Leafs (1930–31)	0–3–0
4	L	November 20, 1930	1–7	@ Montreal Canadiens (1930–31)	0–4–0
5	W	November 22, 1930	4–3	New York Americans (1930–31)	1–4–0
6	W	November 25, 1930	5–2	New York Rangers (1930–31)	2–4–0

December

Game	Result	Date	Score	Opponent	Record
7	W	December 2, 1930	2–1	Chicago Black Hawks (1930–31)	3–4–0
8	W	December 6, 1930	1–0	Ottawa Senators (1930–31)	4–4–0
9	L	December 9, 1930	1–2	@ Boston Bruins (1930–31)	4–5–0
10	W	December 11, 1930	3–2	Detroit Falcons (1930–31)	5–5–0
11	W	December 14, 1930	2–0	@ Chicago Black Hawks (1930–31)	6–5–0
12	W	December 18, 1930	2–1	@ Toronto Maple Leafs (1930–31)	7–5–0
13	W	December 20, 1930	5–1	Philadelphia Quakers (1930–31)	8–5–0
14	T	December 23, 1930	4–4 OT	Toronto Maple Leafs (1930–31)	8–5–1
15	L	December 25, 1930	1–2	@ New York Americans (1930–31)	8–6–1
16	T	December 28, 1930	2–2 OT	@ Detroit Falcons (1930–31)	8–6–2
17	T	December 30, 1930	1–1 OT	Montreal Canadiens (1930–31)	8–6–3

January

Game	Result	Date	Score	Opponent	Record
18	W	January 1, 1931	3–2	@ Ottawa Senators (1930–31)	9–6–3
19	W	January 3, 1931	5–3	Boston Bruins (1930–31)	10–6–3
20	L	January 6, 1931	1–5	@ New York Rangers (1930–31)	10–7–3
21	L	January 8, 1931	0–1	@ Toronto Maple Leafs (1930–31)	10–8–3
22	L	January 10, 1931	3–4 OT	@ Philadelphia Quakers (1930–31)	10–9–3
23	W	January 13, 1931	6–1	Detroit Falcons (1930–31)	11–9–3
24	L	January 15, 1931	1–4	@ Montreal Canadiens (1930–31)	11–10–3
25	W	January 17, 1931	3–2	Ottawa Senators (1930–31)	12–10–3
26	L	January 22, 1931	2–4	Toronto Maple Leafs (1930–31)	12–11–3
27	W	January 25, 1931	3–2 OT	@ Chicago Black Hawks (1930–31)	13–11–3
28	W	January 27, 1931	2–1	@ Detroit Falcons (1930–31)	14–11–3
29	T	January 31, 1931	2–2 OT	New York Rangers (1930–31)	14–11–4

February

Game	Result	Date	Score	Opponent	Record
30	L	February 3, 1931	0–3	@ New York Rangers (1930–31)	14–12–4
31	T	February 5, 1931	4–4 OT	Montreal Canadiens (1930–31)	14–12–5
32	L	February 10, 1931	2–4	New York Americans (1930–31)	14–13–5
33	L	February 14, 1931	2–4	Boston Bruins (1930–31)	14–14–5
34	L	February 17, 1931	0–2	@ Montreal Canadiens (1930–31)	14–15–5
35	L	February 19, 1931	2–4	@ New York Americans (1930–31)	14–16–5
36	T	February 21, 1931	3–3 OT	@ Ottawa Senators (1930–31)	14–16–6
37	W	February 24, 1931	3–2 OT	Chicago Black Hawks (1930–31)	15–16–6
38	W	February 28, 1931	4–1	Philadelphia Quakers (1930–31)	16–16–6

March

Game	Result	Date	Score	Opponent	Record
39	W	March 5, 1931	6–5	@ Toronto Maple Leafs (1930–31)	17–16–6
40	W	March 7, 1931	6–2	Ottawa Senators (1930–31)	18–16–6
41	W	March 12, 1931	3–0	Montreal Canadiens (1930–31)	19–16–6
42	W	March 14, 1931	3–2	@ Philadelphia Quakers (1930–31)	20–16–6
43	L	March 17, 1931	1–2	New York Americans (1930–31)	20–17–6
44	L	March 21, 1931	1–3	@ Boston Bruins (1930–31)	20–18–6

Legend: Win (2 points) Loss (0 points) Tie (1 point)

== Playoffs ==
They went against the New York Rangers in the first round and lost 8 goals to 1, or 1–8.

== Player statistics ==
=== Regular season ===
Scoring

Player	Pos	GP	G	A	Pts	PIM
Nels Stewart	C	42	25	14	39	75
Babe Siebert	LW/D	43	16	12	28	76
Hooley Smith	C/RW	39	12	14	26	68
Jimmy Ward	RW	41	14	8	22	52
Dave Trottier	LW	43	9	8	17	58
Baldy Northcott	D/LW	22	7	3	10	15
Merlyn Phillips	C	43	6	1	7	38
Lionel Conacher	D	36	4	3	7	57
John Gallagher	D	35	4	2	6	35
Jack McVicar	D	40	2	4	6	35
Archie Wilcox	RW/D	39	2	2	4	42
Earl Roche	LW	42	2	0	2	18
Al Huggins	LW	20	1	1	2	2
Paul Haynes	C	19	1	0	1	0
Dunc Munro	D	4	0	1	1	0
Des Roche	RW	19	0	1	1	6
Georges Boucher	D	30	0	0	0	25
Glenn Brydson	RW	14	0	0	0	4
Dave Kerr	G	28	0	0	0	0
Flat Walsh	G	16	0	0	0	0

Goaltending

Player	MIN	GP	W	L	T	GA	GAA	SO
Dave Kerr	1769	29	13	11	4	70	2.37	1
Flat Walsh	961	16	7	7	2	36	2.25	2
Team:	2730	44	20	18	6	106	2.33	3

=== Playoffs ===
Scoring

Player	Pos	GP	G	A	Pts	PIM
Nels Stewart	C	2	1	0	1	6
Baldy Northcott	D/LW	2	0	1	1	0
Glenn Brydson	RW	2	0	0	0	0
Lionel Conacher	D	2	0	0	0	2
John Gallagher	D	2	0	0	0	0
Dave Kerr	G	2	0	0	0	0
Jack McVicar	D	2	0	0	0	2
Merlyn Phillips	C	1	0	0	0	2
Earl Roche	LW	2	0	0	0	0
Babe Siebert	LW/D	2	0	0	0	6
Dave Trottier	LW	2	0	0	0	6
Jimmy Ward	RW	2	0	0	0	2
Archie Wilcox	RW/D	2	0	0	0	2

Goaltending

Player	MIN	GP	W	L	GA	GAA	SO
Dave Kerr	120	2	0	2	8	4.00	0
Team:	120	2	0	2	8	4.00	0

Note: GP = Games played; G = Goals; A = Assists; Pts = Points; +/- = Plus/minus; PIM = Penalty minutes; PPG = Power-play goals; SHG = Short-handed goals; GWG = Game-winning goals
MIN = Minutes played; W = Wins; L = Losses; T = Ties; GA = Goals against; GAA = Goals against average; SO = Shutouts;

== See also ==
- 1930–31 NHL season
