= 1930–31 Montreal Canadiens season =

NHL hockey team season

1930–31 Montreal Canadiens
- Stanley Cup champions
- O'Brien Trophy winners
- Division: 1st Canadian
- 1930–31 record: 26–10–8
- Home record: 15–3–4
- Road record: 11–7–4
- Goals for: 129
- Goals against: 89

Team information
- General manager: Leo Dandurand
- Coach: Cecil Hart
- Captain: Sylvio Mantha
- Arena: Montreal Forum

Team leaders
- Goals: Howie Morenz (28)
- Assists: Howie Morenz (23)
- Points: Howie Morenz (51)
- Penalty minutes: Marty Burke (104)
- Wins: George Hainsworth (26)
- Goals against average: George Hainsworth (1.95)

The 1930–31 Montreal Canadiens season was the team's 22nd season. The Montreal Canadiens defeated the Chicago Black Hawks three games to two in a best-of-five Stanley Cup Final for their second consecutive Cup win and fourth in team history.

== Regular season ==
Howie Morenz led the league in scoring.

=== Final standings ===
Canadian Division
	GP	W	L	T	GF	GA	PTS
**Montreal Canadiens**	44	26	10	8	129	89	60
**Toronto Maple Leafs**	44	22	13	9	118	99	53
**Montreal Maroons**	44	20	18	6	105	106	46
New York Americans	44	18	16	10	76	74	46
Ottawa Senators	44	10	30	4	91	142	24

Note: W = Wins, L = Losses, T = Ties, GF = Goals For, GA = Goals Against, Pts = Points
Teams that qualified for the playoffs are highlighted in bold.

=== Record vs. opponents ===
==== Vs. Canadian Division ====
1930–31 NHL records
Team	**MTL**	**MTM**	**NYA**	**OTT**	**TOR**	**Total**
M. Canadiens	—	3–1–2	5–0–1	5–0–1	3–2–1	**16–3–5**
M. Maroons	1–3–2	—	1–5	4–1–1	2–3–1	**8–13–4**
N.Y. Americans	0–5–1	5–1	—	4–2	1–2–3	**10–10–4**
Ottawa	0–5–1	1–4–1	2–4	—	1–4–1	**4–17–3**
Toronto	2–3–1	3–2–1	2–1–3	4–1–1	—	**11–7–6**

==== Vs. American Division ====
1930–31 NHL records
Team	**BOS**	**CHI**	**DET**	**NYR**	**PHI**	**Total**
M. Canadiens	2–1–1	3–0–1	2–2	2–2	3–0–1	**12–5–3**
M. Maroons	1–3	4–0	3–0–1	1–2–1	3–1	**12–6–2**
N.Y. Americans	2–2	1–3	2–0–2	0–1–3	3–0–1	**8–6–6**
Ottawa	0–4	0–4	2–2	1–3	3–0–1	**6–13–1**
Toronto	1–2–1	4–0	1–2–1	2–1–1	3–1	**11–6–3**

== Schedule and results ==
1930–31 regular season
November

Game	Result	Date	Score	Opponent	Record
1	W	November 15, 1930	5–1	Ottawa Senators (1930–31)	1–0–0
2	L	November 18, 1930	2–5	@ Boston Bruins (1930–31)	1–1–0
3	W	November 20, 1930	7–1	Montreal Maroons (1930–31)	2–1–0
4	L	November 23, 1930	0–3	@ Chicago Black Hawks (1930–31)	2–2–0
5	L	November 27, 1930	2–3	@ Detroit Falcons (1930–31)	2–3–0
6	W	November 29, 1930	3–2	Boston Bruins (1930–31)	3–3–0

December

Game	Result	Date	Score	Opponent	Record
7	W	December 2, 1930	2–0	@ Philadelphia Quakers (1930–31)	4–3–0
8	W	December 4, 1930	5–4	New York Rangers (1930–31)	5–3–0
9	W	December 7, 1930	3–2	@ New York Americans (1930–31)	6–3–0
10	W	December 9, 1930	2–1	Toronto Maple Leafs (1930–31)	7–3–0
11	W	December 11, 1930	5–4 OT	@ Ottawa Senators (1930–31)	8–3–0
12	T	December 13, 1930	1–1 OT	New York Americans (1930–31)	8–3–1
13	T	December 18, 1930	0–0 OT	Chicago Black Hawks (1930–31)	8–3–2
14	L	December 23, 1930	1–5	@ New York Rangers (1930–31)	8–4–2
15	W	December 27, 1930	8–5	Ottawa Senators (1930–31)	9–4–2
16	T	December 30, 1930	1–1 OT	@ Montreal Maroons (1930–31)	9–4–3

January

Game	Result	Date	Score	Opponent	Record
17	L	January 3, 1931	1–2	@ Toronto Maple Leafs (1930–31)	9–5–3
18	L	January 6, 1931	2–6	Detroit Falcons (1930–31)	9–6–3
19	W	January 8, 1931	2–1	@ New York Americans (1930–31)	10–6–3
20	W	January 10, 1931	6–1	Toronto Maple Leafs (1930–31)	11–6–3
21	W	January 13, 1931	2–1	@ Philadelphia Quakers (1930–31)	12–6–3
22	W	January 15, 1931	4–1	Montreal Maroons (1930–31)	13–6–3
23	L	January 17, 1931	1–3	@ Toronto Maple Leafs (1930–31)	13–7–3
24	W	January 20, 1931	3–2 OT	@ New York Rangers (1930–31)	14–7–3
25	W	January 22, 1931	3–0	@ Ottawa Senators (1930–31)	15–7–3
26	W	January 24, 1931	6–1	New York Americans (1930–31)	16–7–3
27	W	January 29, 1931	7–1	Philadelphia Quakers (1930–31)	17–7–3

February

Game	Result	Date	Score	Opponent	Record
28	W	February 1, 1931	4–2	@ Chicago Black Hawks (1930–31)	18–7–3
29	W	February 3, 1931	2–1	Toronto Maple Leafs (1930–31)	19–7–3
30	T	February 5, 1931	4–4 OT	@ Montreal Maroons (1930–31)	19–7–4
31	L	February 7, 1931	1–2	Boston Bruins (1930–31)	19–8–4
32	W	February 15, 1931	2–0	@ New York Americans (1930–31)	20–8–4
33	W	February 17, 1931	2–0	Montreal Maroons (1930–31)	21–8–4
34	T	February 19, 1931	1–1 OT	@ Boston Bruins (1930–31)	21–8–5
35	W	February 21, 1931	6–4	New York Americans (1930–31)	22–8–5
36	W	February 26, 1931	5–0	Detroit Falcons (1930–31)	23–8–5
37	T	February 28, 1931	5–5 OT	@ Toronto Maple Leafs (1930–31)	23–8–6

March

Game	Result	Date	Score	Opponent	Record
38	W	March 3, 1931	1–0	@ Ottawa Senators (1930–31)	24–8–6
39	L	March 5, 1931	1–2	New York Rangers (1930–31)	24–9–6
40	W	March 8, 1931	2–0	@ Detroit Falcons (1930–31)	25–9–6
41	W	March 10, 1931	2–1	Chicago Black Hawks (1930–31)	26–9–6
42	L	March 12, 1931	0–3	@ Montreal Maroons (1930–31)	26–10–6
43	T	March 14, 1931	3–3 OT	Ottawa Senators (1930–31)	26–10–7
44	T	March 21, 1931	4–4 OT	Philadelphia Quakers (1930–31)	26–10–8

Legend: Win (2 points) Loss (0 points) Tie (1 point)

== Playoffs ==
The Canadiens, by placing first, received a bye to the semi-finals where they met the Boston Bruins, who had won the American Division. The Canadiens took the best-of-five series three games to two to advance to the final.

=== Final ===
==== Montreal Canadiens vs. Chicago Black Hawks ====
Date	Away	Score	Home	Score	Notes
April 3	Montreal Canadiens	2	Chicago Black Hawks	1	
April 5	Montreal Canadiens	1	Chicago Black Hawks	2	2OT
April 9	Chicago Black Hawks	3	Montreal Canadiens	2	3OT
April 11	Chicago Black Hawks	1	Montreal Canadiens	2	
April 14	Chicago Black Hawks	1	Montreal Canadiens	2	

Montreal won the best-of-five series 3–2.

== Player statistics ==
=== Regular season ===
==== Scoring ====
Player	Pos	GP	G	A	Pts	PIM
Howie Morenz	C	39	28	23	51	49
Aurel Joliat	LW	43	13	22	35	73
Johnny Gagnon	RW	41	18	7	25	43
Pit Lepine	C	44	17	7	24	63
Georges Mantha	D/LW	44	11	6	17	25
Albert Leduc	D	44	8	6	14	82
Wildor Larochelle	RW	40	8	5	13	35
Nick Wasnie	RW	44	9	2	11	26
Sylvio Mantha	D	44	4	7	11	75
Armand Mondou	LW	40	5	4	9	10
Marty Burke	D	44	2	5	7	91
Gus Rivers	RW	44	2	5	7	6
Bert McCaffrey	RW/D	22	2	1	3	10
Art Lesieur	D	21	2	0	2	14
George Hainsworth	G	44	0	0	0	0
Jean Pusie	D	6	0	0	0	0

==== Goaltending ====
Player	MIN	GP	W	L	T	GA	GAA	SO
George Hainsworth	2740	44	26	10	8	89	1.95	8
Team:	2740	44	26	10	8	89	1.95	8

=== Playoffs ===
==== Scoring ====
Player	Pos	GP	G	A	Pts	PIM
Johnny Gagnon	RW	10	6	2	8	8
Georges Mantha	D/LW	10	5	1	6	4
Pit Lepine	C	10	4	2	6	6
Nick Wasnie	RW	10	4	1	5	8
Howie Morenz	C	10	1	4	5	10
Aurel Joliat	LW	10	0	4	4	12
Sylvio Mantha	D	10	2	1	3	26
Marty Burke	D	10	1	2	3	10
Wildor Larochelle	RW	10	1	2	3	8
Albert Leduc	D	7	0	2	2	9
Gus Rivers	RW	10	1	0	1	0
George Hainsworth	G	10	0	0	0	0
Art Lesieur	D	10	0	0	0	4
Armand Mondou	LW	8	0	0	0	0
Jean Pusie	D	3	0	0	0	0

==== Goaltending ====
Player	MIN	GP	W	L	GA	GAA	SO
George Hainsworth	722	10	6	4	21	1.75	2
Team:	722	10	6	4	21	1.75	2

Note:

Pos = Position;GP = Games played; G = Goals; A = Assists; Pts = Points; PIM = Penalty minutes; +/- = Plus/minus; PPG = Power-play goals; SHG = Short-handed goals; GWG = Game-winning goals
Pos = Position;GP = Games played; Min, TOI = Minutes played; W = Wins; L = Losses; T,T/OT = Ties; OTL = Overtime losses; GA = Goals-against; GAA = Goals-against average; SO = Shutouts; SA = Shots against; SV = Shots saved;SV% = Save percentage;

== Awards and records ==
- O'Brien Cup – winner of Canadian division

== See also ==
- 1930–31 NHL season
