= 1930–31 Ottawa Senators season =

National Hockey League team season

1930–31 Ottawa Senators
- Division: 5th Canadian
- 1930–31 record: 10–30–4
- Home record: 6–14–2
- Road record: 4–16–2
- Goals for: 91
- Goals against: 142

Team information
- General manager: Dave Gill
- Coach: Newsy Lalonde & Dave Gill
- Captain: Frank Finnigan
- Arena: Ottawa Auditorium

Team leaders
- Goals: Art Gagne (19)
- Assists: Bill Touhey (15)
- Points: Art Gagne & Bill Touhey (30)
- Penalty minutes: Joe Lamb (91)
- Wins: Alec Connell (10)
- Goals against average: Alec Connell (3.01)

The 1930–31 Ottawa Senators season was the club's 14th season in the NHL, 46th overall. The club failed to make the playoffs, attendance continued to fall, and the team was losing money.

== Off-season ==
Prior to the season beginning, the Senators sent future Hall of Fame defenceman King Clancy to the Toronto Maple Leafs in exchange for $35,000($631,538 in 2025 dollars) and two players.

== Regular season ==
Art Gagne led the team offensively, scoring a team high 19 goals, while tying with Bill Touhey for the lead in points at 30.

Alec Connell would get the majority of action in the Senators net, winning all ten games the Senators won and posting a 3.01 GAA. Bill Beveridge would also get some time in goal, however he finished 0–8–0 with a GAA of 3.69.

The Senators would finish in last place for the first time in team history, and with the Great Depression taking its toll on the team, the NHL allowed the Senators and the Philadelphia Quakers to suspend operations for the 1931–32 NHL season, renting the players for $25,000.

=== Final standings ===
Canadian Division
	GP	W	L	T	GF	GA	PTS
**Montreal Canadiens**	44	26	10	8	129	89	60
**Toronto Maple Leafs**	44	22	13	9	118	99	53
**Montreal Maroons**	44	20	18	6	105	106	46
New York Americans	44	18	16	10	76	74	46
Ottawa Senators	44	10	30	4	91	142	24

Note: W = Wins, L = Losses, T = Ties, GF = Goals For, GA = Goals Against, Pts = Points
Teams that qualified for the playoffs are highlighted in bold.

=== Record vs. opponents ===
==== Vs. Canadian Division ====
1930–31 NHL records
Team	MTL	MTM	NYA	OTT	TOR	Total
M. Canadiens	—	3–1–2	5–0–1	5–0–1	3–2–1	**16–3–5**
M. Maroons	1–3–2	—	1–5	4–1–1	2–3–1	**8–13–4**
N.Y. Americans	0–5–1	5–1	—	4–2	1–2–3	**10–10–4**
Ottawa	0–5–1	1–4–1	2–4	—	1–4–1	**4–17–3**
Toronto	2–3–1	3–2–1	2–1–3	4–1–1	—	**11–7–6**

==== Vs. American Division ====
1930–31 NHL records
Team	BOS	CHI	DET	NYR	PHI	Total
M. Canadiens	2–1–1	3–0–1	2–2	2–2	3–0–1	**12–5–3**
M. Maroons	1–3	4–0	3–0–1	1–2–1	3–1	**12–6–2**
N.Y. Americans	2–2	1–3	2–0–2	0–1–3	3–0–1	**8–6–6**
Ottawa	0–4	0–4	2–2	1–3	3–0–1	**6–13–1**
Toronto	1–2–1	4–0	1–2–1	2–1–1	3–1	**11–6–3**

== Schedule and results ==
1930–31 regular season
November: 3–4–1 (home: 2–2–0; road: 1–2–1)

Game	Date	Visitor	Score	Home	OT	Decision	Attendance	Arena	Record	Pts
1	November 11	Maroons	0–2	Ottawa		Connell	N/A	Ottawa Auditorium	1–0–0	2
2	November 15	Ottawa	1–5	Canadiens		Connell	N/A	Montreal Forum	1–1–0	2
3	November 18	Ottawa	2–2	Philadelphia	OT	Connell	N/A	Philadelphia Arena	1–1–1	3
4	November 20	Detroit	0–1	Ottawa		Connell	N/A	Ottawa Auditorium	2–1–1	5
5	November 22	Ottawa	0–2	Toronto		Connell	N/A	Mutual Street Arena	2–2–1	5
6	November 25	Ottawa	1–0	Americans		Connell	N/A	Madison Square Garden	3–2–1	7
7	November 27	Boston	2–1	Ottawa		Connell	N/A	Ottawa Auditorium	3–3–1	7
8	November 30	Chicago	3–0	Ottawa		Connell	N/A	Ottawa Auditorium	3–4–1	7

December: 1–8–0 (home: 1–2–0; road: 0–6–0)

Game	Date	Visitor	Score	Home	OT	Decision	Attendance	Arena	Record	Pts
9	December 4	Philadelphia	2–5	Ottawa		Connell	N/A	Ottawa Auditorium	4–4–1	9
10	December 6	Ottawa	0–1	Maroons		Connell	N/A	Montreal Forum	4–5–1	9
11	December 9	Ottawa	2–3	Rangers		Connell	N/A	Madison Square Garden	4–6–1	9
12	December 11	Canadiens	5–4	Ottawa	OT	Connell	N/A	Ottawa Auditorium	4–7–1	9
13	December 16	Ottawa	2–4	Chicago		Connell	N/A	Chicago Stadium	4–8–1	9
14	December 18	Ottawa	0–3	Detroit		Connell	N/A	Detroit Olympia	4–9–1	9
15	December 25	Rangers	4–1	Ottawa		Connell	N/A	Ottawa Auditorium	4–10–1	9
16	December 27	Ottawa	5–8	Canadiens		Beveridge	N/A	Montreal Forum	4–11–1	9
17	December 30	Ottawa	3–7	Boston		Beveridge	N/A	Boston Garden	4–12–1	9

January: 1–8–1 (home: 0–5–1; road: 1–3–0)

Game	Date	Visitor	Score	Home	OT	Decision	Attendance	Arena	Record	Pts
18	January 1	Maroons	3–2	Ottawa		Connell	N/A	Ottawa Auditorium	4–13–1	9
19	January 3	Ottawa	5–4	Philadelphia	OT	Connell	N/A	Philadelphia Arena	5–13–1	11
20	January 6	Toronto	2–2	Ottawa	OT	Connell	N/A	Ottawa Auditorium	5–13–2	12
21	January 8	Boston	3–1	Ottawa		Connell	N/A	Ottawa Auditorium	5–14–2	12
22	January 15	Americans	2–1	Ottawa		Beveridge	N/A	Ottawa Auditorium	5–15–2	12
23	January 17	Ottawa	2–3	Maroons		Connell	N/A	Montreal Forum	5–16–2	12
24	January 20	Ottawa	2–4	Boston		Connell	N/A	Boston Garden	5–17–2	12
25	January 22	Canadiens	3–0	Ottawa		Beveridge	N/A	Ottawa Auditorium	5–18–2	12
26	January 24	Ottawa	2–5	Toronto		Connell	N/A	Mutual Street Arena	5–19–2	12
27	January 29	Toronto	3–2	Ottawa		Beveridge	N/A	Ottawa Auditorium	5–20–2	12

February: 4–4–1 (home: 2–2–1; road: 2–2–0)

Game	Date	Visitor	Score	Home	OT	Decision	Attendance	Arena	Record	Pts
28	February 1	Ottawa	2–4	Americans		Connell	N/A	Madison Square Garden	5–21–2	12
29	February 3	Americans	4–2	Ottawa		Beveridge	N/A	Ottawa Auditorium	5–22–2	12
30	February 5	Detroit	4–5	Ottawa		Connell	N/A	Detroit Olympia	6–22–2	14
31	February 8	Ottawa	0–2	Detroit		Beveridge	N/A	Detroit Olympia	6–23–2	14
32	February 12	Chicago	3–2	Ottawa		Beveridge	N/A	Ottawa Auditorium	6–24–2	14
33	February 17	Ottawa	5–4	Rangers		Connell	N/A	Madison Square Garden	7–24–2	16
34	February 19	Ottawa	2–1	Toronto		Connell	N/A	Madison Square Garden	8–24–2	18
35	February 21	Maroons	3–3	Ottawa	OT	Connell	N/A	Ottawa Auditorium	8–24–3	19
36	February 26	Americans	2–4	Ottawa		Connell	N/A	Ottawa Auditorium	9–24–3	21

March: 1–6–1 (home: 1–3–0; road: 0–3–1)

Game	Date	Visitor	Score	Home	OT	Decision	Attendance	Arena	Record	Pts
37	March 1	Ottawa	0–5	Chicago		Connell	N/A	Chicago Stadium	9–25–3	21
38	March 3	Canadiens	1–0	Ottawa		Connell	N/A	Ottawa Auditorium	9–26–3	21
39	March 7	Ottawa	2–6	Maroons		Connell	N/A	Montreal Forum	9–27–3	21
40	March 10	Philadelphia	3–5	Ottawa	OT	Connell	N/A	Ottawa Auditorium	10–27–3	23
41	March 12	Ottawa	0–2	Americans		Connell	N/A	Madison Square Garden	10–28–3	23
42	March 14	Ottawa	3–3	Canadiens		Connell	N/A	Montreal Forum	10–28–4	24
43	March 17	Rangers	3–1	Ottawa		Connell	N/A	Madison Square Garden	10–29–4	24
44	March 21	Toronto	9–6	Ottawa		Connell	N/A	Galt Arena Gardens	10–30–4	24

Legend: Win (2 points) Loss (0 points) Tie (1 point)

== Player statistics ==
=== Regular season ===
Scoring

Player	Pos	GP	G	A	Pts	PIM
Art Gagne	RW	44	19	11	30	50
Bill Touhey	LW	44	15	15	30	8
Joe Lamb	RW	44	11	14	25	91
Hec Kilrea	LW	44	14	8	22	44
Danny Cox	LW	44	9	12	21	12
Frank Finnigan	RW	44	9	8	17	40
Alex Smith	D	37	5	6	11	73
Len Grosvenor	C/RW	33	5	4	9	25
Art Smith	D	43	2	4	6	61
Leo Bourgeault	D	28	0	4	4	28
Harold Starr	D	35	2	1	3	48
Bill Beveridge	G	9	0	0	0	0
Alec Connell	G	36	0	0	0	0
Harry Connor	LW	11	0	0	0	4
Ray Kinsella	LW	14	0	0	0	0
Eric Pettinger	LW/C	13	0	0	0	2

Goaltending

Player	MIN	GP	W	L	T	GA	GAA	SO
Alec Connell	2190	36	10	22	4	110	3.01	3
Bill Beveridge	520	9	0	8	0	32	3.69	0
Team:	2710	44	10	30	4	142	3.14	3

Note:

Pos = Position;GP = Games played; G = Goals; A = Assists; Pts = Points; PIM = Penalty minutes; +/- = Plus/minus; PPG = Power-play goals; SHG = Short-handed goals; GWG = Game-winning goals
Pos = Position;GP = Games played; Min, TOI = Minutes played; W = Wins; L = Losses; T,T/OT = Ties; OTL = Overtime losses; GA = Goals-against; GAA = Goals-against average; SO = Shutouts; SA = Shots against; SV = Shots saved;SV% = Save percentage;

== Transactions ==
The Senators were involved in the following transactions during the 1930–31 season.

=== Trades ===
September 1, 1930	To Ottawa Senators Cash	To Philadelphia Quakers Loan of Wally Kilrea
October 10, 1930	To Ottawa Senators Art Smith; Eric Pettinger $35,000	To Toronto Maple Leafs Jack Duggan; King Clancy
October 16, 1930	To Ottawa Senators Harry Connor	To Boston Bruins Bill Hutton
October 24, 1930	To Ottawa Senators Cash	To London Tecumsehs (IHL Len Grosvenor
November 6, 1930	To Ottawa Senators $35,000	To Philadelphia Quakers Loan of Syd Howe; Wally Kilrea; Al Shields
December 1, 1930	To Ottawa Senators Len Grosvenor	To London Tecumsehs (IHL Harry Connor
December 7, 1930	To Ottawa Senators Leo Bourgeault	To New York Rangers Cash

=== Free agents signed ===
February 3, 1931	From Ottawa Rideaus (OCHL) Ray Kinsella

== See also ==
- 1930–31 NHL season
