= 1930–31 New York Americans season =

National Hockey League team season

1930–31 New York Americans
- Division: 4th Canadian
- 1930–31 record: 18–16–10
- Home record: 12–6–4
- Road record: 6–10–6
- Goals for: 76
- Goals against: 74

Team information
- General manager: Eddie Gerard
- Coach: Eddie Gerard
- Captain: Billy Burch
- Arena: Madison Square Garden

Team leaders
- Goals: Norman Himes (15)
- Assists: Charles McVeigh; Mervyn Dutton (11)
- Points: Billy Burch (16)
- Penalty minutes: Norman Himes (24)
- Wins: Roy Worters (18)
- Goals against average: Roy Worters (1.61)

The 1930–31 New York Americans season was the sixth season of play. The Americans improved their record to escape last-place in the Canadian Division, but did not qualify for the playoffs.

== Offseason ==
Eddie Gerard was hired to coach the team. Four players were picked up for cash from the Montreal Maroons: Frank Carson, Mike Neville, Hap Emms and Red Dutton. Dutton would be with the club until its demise in 1942, becoming the team manager after the NHL took over. Just before the start of the season, the Americans traded Lionel Conacher to the Maroons for cash. The Americans signed three new players: John Keating, Vernon Ayres and Gord Kuhn.

== Regular season ==
=== Final standings ===
Canadian Division
	GP	W	L	T	GF	GA	PTS
**Montreal Canadiens**	44	26	10	8	129	89	60
**Toronto Maple Leafs**	44	22	13	9	118	99	53
**Montreal Maroons**	44	20	18	6	105	106	46
New York Americans	44	18	16	10	76	74	46
Ottawa Senators	44	10	30	4	91	142	24

Note: W = Wins, L = Losses, T = Ties, GF = Goals For, GA = Goals Against, Pts = Points
Teams that qualified for the playoffs are highlighted in bold.

=== Record vs. opponents ===
==== Vs. Canadian Division ====
1930–31 NHL records
Team	**MTL**	**MTM**	**NYA**	**OTT**	**TOR**	**Total**
M. Canadiens	—	3–1–2	5–0–1	5–0–1	3–2–1	**16–3–5**
M. Maroons	1–3–2	—	1–5	4–1–1	2–3–1	**8–13–4**
N.Y. Americans	0–5–1	5–1	—	4–2	1–2–3	**10–10–4**
Ottawa	0–5–1	1–4–1	2–4	—	1–4–1	**4–17–3**
Toronto	2–3–1	3–2–1	2–1–3	4–1–1	—	**11–7–6**

==== Vs. American Division ====
1930–31 NHL records
Team	**BOS**	**CHI**	**DET**	**NYR**	**PHI**	**Total**
M. Canadiens	2–1–1	3–0–1	2–2	2–2	3–0–1	**12–5–3**
M. Maroons	1–3	4–0	3–0–1	1–2–1	3–1	**12–6–2**
N.Y. Americans	2–2	1–3	2–0–2	0–1–3	3–0–1	**8–6–6**
Ottawa	0–4	0–4	2–2	1–3	3–0–1	**6–13–1**
Toronto	1–2–1	4–0	1–2–1	2–1–1	3–1	**11–6–3**

== Schedule and results ==
1930–31 regular season
November

Game	Result	Date	Score	Opponent	Record
1	L	November 11, 1930	0–1	@ Boston Bruins (1930–31)	0–1–0
2	T	November 13, 1930	0–0 OT	@ Toronto Maple Leafs (1930–31)	0–1–1
3	W	November 16, 1930	1–0	Montreal Maroons (1930–31)	1–1–1
4	T	November 18, 1930	0–0 OT	@ New York Rangers (1930–31)	1–1–2
5	T	November 20, 1930	0–0 OT	Toronto Maple Leafs (1930–31)	1–1–3
6	L	November 22, 1930	3–4	@ Montreal Maroons (1930–31)	1–2–3
7	L	November 25, 1930	0–1	Ottawa Senators (1930–31)	1–3–3
8	T	November 30, 1930	2–2 OT	@ Detroit Falcons (1930–31)	1–3–4

December

Game	Result	Date	Score	Opponent	Record
9	L	December 4, 1930	2–4	@ Chicago Black Hawks (1930–31)	1–4–4
10	L	December 7, 1930	2–3	Montreal Canadiens (1930–31)	1–5–4
11	W	December 9, 1930	2–1	@ Philadelphia Quakers (1930–31)	2–5–4
12	W	December 11, 1930	2–1	Boston Bruins (1930–31)	3–5–4
13	T	December 13, 1930	1–1 OT	@ Montreal Canadiens (1930–31)	3–5–5
14	W	December 16, 1930	3–0	Philadelphia Quakers (1930–31)	4–5–5
15	W	December 21, 1930	6–4	Detroit Falcons (1930–31)	5–5–5
16	W	December 25, 1930	2–1	Montreal Maroons (1930–31)	6–5–5
17	T	December 30, 1930	2–2 OT	New York Rangers (1930–31)	6–5–6

January

Game	Result	Date	Score	Opponent	Record
18	L	January 1, 1931	0–2	@ Toronto Maple Leafs (1930–31)	6–6–6
19	W	January 4, 1931	5–0	Philadelphia Quakers (1930–31)	7–6–6
20	L	January 8, 1931	1–2	Montreal Canadiens (1930–31)	7–7–6
21	L	January 13, 1931	0–1	Chicago Black Hawks (1930–31)	7–8–6
22	W	January 15, 1931	2–1	@ Ottawa Senators (1930–31)	8–8–6
23	T	January 18, 1931	2–2 OT	Detroit Falcons (1930–31)	8–8–7
24	W	January 22, 1931	2–1	Boston Bruins (1930–31)	9–8–7
25	L	January 24, 1931	1–6	@ Montreal Canadiens (1930–31)	9–9–7
26	W	January 27, 1931	3–2	Toronto Maple Leafs (1930–31)	10–9–7

February

Game	Result	Date	Score	Opponent	Record
27	W	February 1, 1931	4–2	Ottawa Senators (1930–31)	11–9–7
28	W	February 3, 1931	4–2	@ Ottawa Senators (1930–31)	12–9–7
29	L	February 5, 1931	0–2	New York Rangers (1930–31)	12–10–7
30	L	February 7, 1931	0–2	@ Toronto Maple Leafs (1930–31)	12–11–7
31	W	February 10, 1931	4–2	@ Montreal Maroons (1930–31)	13–11–7
32	T	February 14, 1931	1–1 OT	@ Philadelphia Quakers (1930–31)	13–11–8
33	L	February 15, 1931	0–2	Montreal Canadiens (1930–31)	13–12–8
34	L	February 17, 1931	0–2	@ Boston Bruins (1930–31)	13–13–8
35	W	February 19, 1931	4–2	Montreal Maroons (1930–31)	14–13–8
36	L	February 21, 1931	4–6	@ Montreal Canadiens (1930–31)	14–14–8
37	T	February 24, 1931	1–1 OT	Toronto Maple Leafs (1930–31)	14–14–9
38	L	February 26, 1931	2–4	@ Ottawa Senators (1930–31)	14–15–9

March

Game	Result	Date	Score	Opponent	Record
39	W	March 1, 1931	2–1 OT	@ Detroit Falcons (1930–31)	15–15–9
40	L	March 5, 1931	0–1	@ Chicago Black Hawks (1930–31)	15–16–9
41	W	March 8, 1931	2–1	Chicago Black Hawks (1930–31)	16–16–9
42	W	March 12, 1931	2–0	Ottawa Senators (1930–31)	17–16–9
43	T	March 15, 1931	0–0 OT	@ New York Rangers (1930–31)	17–16–10
44	W	March 17, 1931	2–1	@ Montreal Maroons (1930–31)	18–16–10

Legend: Win (2 points) Loss (0 points) Tie (1 point)

== Player statistics ==
=== Regular season ===
Scoring

Player	GP	G	A	Pts	PIM
Normie Himes	44	15	9	24	18
Billy Burch	44	14	8	22	35
Charley McVeigh	44	5	11	16	23
George Patterson	44	8	6	14	67
Frank Carson	44	6	7	13	36
Johnny Sheppard	42	5	8	13	16
Albert Hughes	42	5	7	12	14
Red Dutton	44	1	11	12	71
George Massecar	43	4	7	11	16
Hap Emms	44	5	4	9	56
Bill Brydge	43	2	5	7	70
Vern Ayres	26	2	1	3	54
Joe Simpson	42	2	0	2	13
Duke Dukowski	12	1	1	2	12
Mike Neville	19	1	0	1	2
Roy Burmister	11	0	0	0	0
Eddie Convey	2	0	0	0	0
Ellie Pringle	6	0	0	0	0
Yip Radley	1	0	0	0	0
Roy Worters	44	0	0	0	0

Goaltending

Player	MIN	GP	W	L	T	GA	GAA	SA	SV	SV%	SO
Roy Worters	2760	44	18	16	10	74	1.61				8
Team:	2760	44	18	16	10	74	1.61				8

== See also ==
- 1930–31 NHL season
