= 1930–31 Detroit Falcons season =

Sports season

1930–31 Detroit Falcons
- Division: 4th American
- 1930–31 record: 16–21–7
- Home record: 10–7–5
- Road record: 6–14–2
- Goals for: 102
- Goals against: 105

Team information
- General manager: Jack Adams
- Coach: Jack Adams
- Captain: George Hay
- Arena: Detroit Olympia

Team leaders
- Goals: Ebbie Goodfellow (25)
- Assists: Ebbie Goodfellow (23)
- Points: Ebbie Goodfellow (48)
- Penalty minutes: Bert McInenly (48)
- Wins: Dolly Dolson (16)
- Goals against average: Dolly Dolson (2.29)

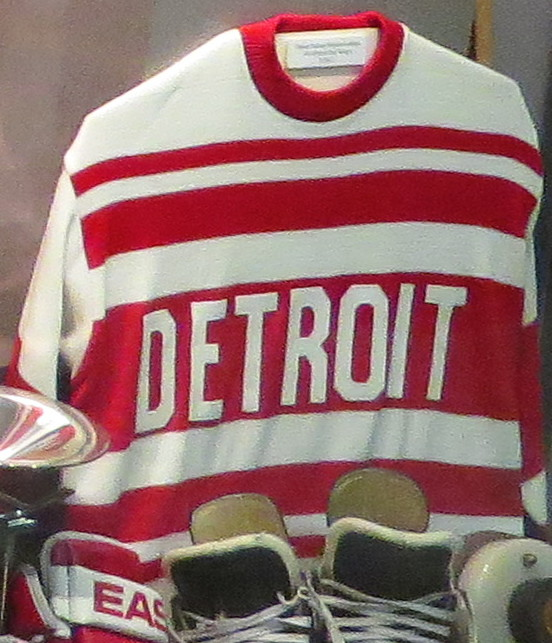
Replica 1930–31 season sweater

The 1930–31 Detroit Falcons season was the Detroit National Hockey League (NHL) franchise's fifth season of play and the first known as the Detroit Falcons. The Falcons missed the playoffs for the first time since the 1926–27 season and the 1927–28 season.

== Regular season ==
=== Final standings ===
American Division
	GP	W	L	T	GF	GA	PTS
**Boston Bruins**	44	28	10	6	143	90	62
**Chicago Black Hawks**	44	24	17	3	108	78	51
**New York Rangers**	44	19	16	9	106	87	47
Detroit Falcons	44	16	21	7	102	105	39
Philadelphia Quakers	44	4	36	4	76	184	12

Note: GP = Games Played, W = Wins, L = Losses, T = Ties, Pts = Points, GF = Goals For, GA = Goals Against
Teams that qualified for the playoffs are highlighted in bold.

=== Record vs. opponents ===
==== Vs. American Division ====
1930–31 NHL records
Team	**BOS**	**CHI**	**DET**	**NYR**	**PHI**	**Total**
Boston	—	2–4	4–1–1	4–0–2	5–0–1	**15–5–4**
Chicago	4–2	—	2–3–1	4–1–1	6–0	**16–6–2**
Detroit	1–4–1	3–2–1	—	2–3–1	4–2	**10–11–3**
N.Y. Rangers	0–4–2	1–4–1	3–2–1	—	6–0	**10–10–4**
Philadelphia	0–5–1	0–6	2–4	0–6	—	**2–21–1**

==== Vs. Canadian Division ====
1930–31 NHL records
Team	**MTL**	**MTM**	**NYA**	**OTT**	**TOR**	**Total**
Boston	1–2–1	3–1	2–2	4–0	2–1–1	**12–6–2**
Chicago	0–3–1	0–4	3–1	4–0	0–4	**7–12–1**
Detroit	2–2	0–3–1	0–2–2	2–2	2–1–1	**6–10–4**
N.Y. Rangers	2–2	2–1–1	1–0–3	3–1	1–2–1	**9–6–5**
Philadelphia	0–3–1	1–3	0–3–1	0–3–1	1–3	**2–15–3**

== Schedule and results ==
1930–31 regular season
November

Game	Result	Date	Score	Opponent	Record
1	W	November 13, 1930	1–0	New York Rangers (1930–31)	1–0–0
2	W	November 16, 1930	5–1	Philadelphia Quakers (1930–31)	2–0–0
3	L	November 20, 1930	0–1	@ Ottawa Senators (1930–31)	2–1–0
4	T	November 23, 1930	2–2 OT	Boston Bruins (1930–31)	2–1–1
5	W	November 27, 1930	3–2	Montreal Canadiens (1930–31)	3–1–1
6	L	November 29, 1930	2–4	@ Toronto Maple Leafs (1930–31)	3–2–1
7	T	November 30, 1930	2–2 OT	New York Americans (1930–31)	3–2–2

December

Game	Result	Date	Score	Opponent	Record
8	L	December 7, 1930	2–3	@ Chicago Black Hawks (1930–31)	3–3–2
9	W	December 9, 1930	1–0	Chicago Black Hawks (1930–31)	4–3–2
10	L	December 11, 1930	2–3	@ Montreal Maroons (1930–31)	4–4–2
11	W	December 13, 1930	3–2	@ Philadelphia Quakers (1930–31)	5–4–2
12	L	December 14, 1930	0–3	@ New York Rangers (1930–31)	5–5–2
13	L	December 16, 1930	2–3	@ Boston Bruins (1930–31)	5–6–2
14	W	December 18, 1930	3–0	Ottawa Senators (1930–31)	6–6–2
15	L	December 21, 1930	4–6	@ New York Americans (1930–31)	6–7–2
16	W	December 25, 1930	10–1	Toronto Maple Leafs (1930–31)	7–7–2
17	T	December 28, 1930	2–2 OT	Montreal Maroons (1930–31)	7–7–3

January

Game	Result	Date	Score	Opponent	Record
18	W	January 4, 1931	2–1	@ Chicago Black Hawks (1930–31)	8–7–3
19	W	January 6, 1931	6–2	@ Montreal Canadiens (1930–31)	9–7–3
20	L	January 8, 1931	0–1	New York Rangers (1930–31)	9–8–3
21	L	January 11, 1931	1–4	Boston Bruins (1930–31)	9–9–3
22	L	January 13, 1931	1–6	@ Montreal Maroons (1930–31)	9–10–3
23	W	January 17, 1931	5–2	@ Philadelphia Quakers (1930–31)	10–10–3
24	T	January 18, 1931	2–2 OT	@ New York Americans (1930–31)	10–10–4
25	W	January 20, 1931	5–2	Philadelphia Quakers (1930–31)	11–10–4
26	W	January 25, 1931	1–0	@ New York Rangers (1930–31)	12–10–4
27	L	January 27, 1931	1–2	Montreal Maroons (1930–31)	12–11–4

February

Game	Result	Date	Score	Opponent	Record
28	W	February 1, 1931	2–0	Toronto Maple Leafs (1930–31)	13–11–4
29	L	February 3, 1931	2–7	@ Boston Bruins (1930–31)	13–12–4
30	L	February 5, 1931	4–5	@ Ottawa Senators (1930–31)	13–13–4
31	W	February 8, 1931	2–0	Ottawa Senators (1930–31)	14–13–4
32	T	February 12, 1931	1–1 OT	New York Rangers (1930–31)	14–13–5
33	T	February 14, 1931	1–1 OT	@ Toronto Maple Leafs (1930–31)	14–13–6
34	L	February 17, 1931	0–2	Philadelphia Quakers (1930–31)	14–14–6
35	W	February 20, 1931	5–4 OT	@ Chicago Black Hawks (1930–31)	15–14–6
36	T	February 22, 1931	1–1 OT	Chicago Black Hawks (1930–31)	15–14–7
37	L	February 26, 1931	0–5	@ Montreal Canadiens (1930–31)	15–15–7

March

Game	Result	Date	Score	Opponent	Record
38	L	March 1, 1931	1–2 OT	New York Americans (1930–31)	15–16–7
39	L	March 8, 1931	0–2	Montreal Canadiens (1930–31)	15–17–7
40	L	March 10, 1931	2–3 OT	@ New York Rangers (1930–31)	15–18–7
41	L	March 12, 1931	5–7	@ Philadelphia Quakers (1930–31)	15–19–7
42	W	March 15, 1931	5–2 OT	Boston Bruins (1930–31)	16–19–7
43	L	March 17, 1931	2–4	@ Boston Bruins (1930–31)	16–20–7
44	L	March 22, 1931	1–2	Chicago Black Hawks (1930–31)	16–21–7

Legend: Win (2 points) Loss (0 points) Tie (1 point)

== Player statistics ==
=== Regular season ===
Scoring

Player	Pos	GP	G	A	Pts	PIM
Ebbie Goodfellow	C/D	44	25	23	48	32
Carson Cooper	RW	44	14	14	28	10
Herbie Lewis	LW	43	15	6	21	38
Larry Aurie	RW	41	12	6	18	23
George Hay	LW	44	8	10	18	24
John Sorrell	LW	39	9	7	16	10
Tommy Filmore	RW	39	6	2	8	10
Bert McInenly	LW/D	44	3	5	8	48
Reg Noble	C/D	44	2	5	7	42
Stewart Evans	D	43	1	4	5	14
Stan McCabe	LW	44	2	1	3	22
Frank Fredrickson	C	24	1	2	3	6
Henry Hicks	D	22	2	0	2	10
John Newman	C/LW	8	1	1	2	0
Jimmy Creighton	F	11	1	0	1	2
Leroy Goldsworthy	RW	12	1	0	1	2
Harvey Rockburn	D	42	0	1	1	118
Dolly Dolson	G	44	0	0	0	0
Frank Steele	RW/D	1	0	0	0	0

Goaltending

Player	MIN	GP	W	L	T	GA	GAA	SO
Dolly Dolson	2750	44	16	21	7	105	2.29	6
Team:	2750	44	16	21	7	105	2.29	6

Note: GP = Games played; G = Goals; A = Assists; Pts = Points; PIM = Penalty minutes; PPG = Power-play goals; SHG = Short-handed goals; GWG = Game-winning goals
MIN = Minutes played; W = Wins; L = Losses; T = Ties; GA = Goals against; GAA = Goals-against average; SO = Shutouts;

== See also ==
- 1930–31 NHL season
