= Al Huggins =

Canadian ice hockey player (1909–1991)

- Born: December 21, 1909 Toronto, Ontario, Canada
- Died: July 28, 1991 (aged 81) Toronto, Ontario, Canada
- Height: 6 ft 0 in (183 cm)
- Weight: 160 lb (73 kg; 11 st 6 lb)
- Position: Left wing
- Shot: Left
- Played for: Montreal Maroons
- National team: Canada
- Playing career: 1927–1942

James Allen Huggins (December 21, 1909 — July 28, 1991) was a Canadian ice hockey player who played 20 games in the National Hockey League for the Montreal Maroons during the 1930–31 season. The rest of his career, which lasted from 1927 to 1942, was spent in various minor leagues. Internationally he played for the Canadian national team at the 1933 World Championships. He was born in Toronto, Ontario.

== Career statistics ==
=== Regular season and playoffs ===
			Regular season					Playoffs
Season	Team	League	GP	G	A	Pts	PIM	GP	G	A	Pts	PIM
1926–27	Toronto Canoe Club	OHA	9	0	0	0	0	—	—	—	—	—
1927–28	Montreal CPR	MCHL	—	—	—	—	—	—	—	—	—	—
1928–29	Iroquois Falls Papermakers	NOHA	—	—	—	—	—	—	—	—	—	—
1929–30	Montreal AAA	MCHL	7	3	0	3	16	2	1	0	1	2
1929–30	Montreal AAA	Al-Cup	—	—	—	—	—	9	2	1	3	26
1930–31	Montreal Maroons	NHL	20	1	1	2	2	—	—	—	—	—
1930–31	Windsor Bulldogs	IHL	27	1	0	1	27	6	0	1	1	4
1931–32	Windsor Bulldogs	IHL	40	13	11	24	51	6	0	3	3	10
1932–33	Windsor Bulldogs	IHL	41	9	9	18	47	6	0	2	2	4
1933–34	Syracuse Stars	IHL	43	14	23	37	24	6	0	3	3	4
1934–35	Syracuse Stars	IHL	42	10	19	29	41	—	—	—	—	—
1937–38	South Porcupine Porkies	NOHA	8	3	5	8	8	—	—	—	—	—
1938–39	South Porcupine Porkies	NOHA	—	13	16	29	—	—	—	—	—	—
1939–40	South Porcupine Porkies	NOHA	15	5	1	6	18	5	1	2	3	8
1939–40	South Porcupine Porkies	Al-Cup	—	—	—	—	—	3	0	0	0	2
1940–41	South Porcupine Porkies	NOHA	22	8	8	16	18	—	—	—	—	—
1941–42	South Porcupine Porkies	NOHA	4	1	4	5	0	—	—	—	—	—
IHL totals			193	47	62	109	190	24	0	9	9	22
NHL totals			20	1	1	2	2	—	—	—	—	—

=== International ===
Year	Team	Event	GP	G	A	Pts	PIM
1933	Canada	WC	5	1	0	1	0
Senior totals			5	1	0	1	0
