= Rennison Manners =

Canadian ice hockey player

- Born: February 5, 1904; Ottawa, Ontario, Canada
- Died: December 26, 1944 (aged 40); Ottawa, Ontario, Canada
- Height: 5 ft 11 in (180 cm)
- Weight: 160 lb (73 kg; 11 st 6 lb)
- Position: Centre
- Shot: Left
- Played for: Pittsburgh Pirates; Philadelphia Quakers; Ottawa Montagnards; London Panthers; Niagara Falls Cataracts
- Playing career: 1926–1934

Rennison Flint "Ren" Manners (February 5, 1904 – December 26, 1944) was a Canadian ice hockey centre who played 37 games over two seasons in the National Hockey League for the Pittsburgh Pirates and Philadelphia Quakers between 1929 and 1931. The rest of his career, which lasted from 1926 to 1934, was mainly spent playing amateur hockey.

== Playing career ==
In 1926–27 Manners joined the senior Montagnards of the Ottawa City Hockey League and led the league in goals two years later.

Manners played for the NHL's Pittsburgh Pirates during the 1929–30 season, collecting three goals and two assists in 33 games. He then became a member of the Quakers when the franchise was relocated to Philadelphia in September 1930. Manners only played four games for the Philadelphia club and spent most of his time with the Niagara Falls Cataracts of the Ontario Professional Hockey League. In 1931, he was reinstated as an amateur and played in a few leagues in the Ottawa area before joining the Montagnards for one last season in 1933–34. He died on December 26, 1944, when he collapsed while waiting for a streetcar.

== Career statistics ==
=== Regular season and playoffs ===
			Regular season					Playoffs
Season	Team	League	GP	G	A	Pts	PIM	GP	G	A	Pts	PIM
1926–27	Ottawa Montagnards	OCHL	15	3	2	5	—	2	0	0	0	0
1927–28	Ottawa Montagnards	OCHL	15	2	4	6	—	4	0	0	0	0
1928–29	Ottawa Montagnards	OCHL	12	8	2	10	—	—	—	—	—	—
1928–29	Philadelphia Utility Company	WPAHL	—	—	—	—	—	—	—	—	—	—
1929–30	Pittsburgh Pirates	NHL	33	3	2	5	14	—	—	—	—	—
1929–30	London Panthers	IHL	3	0	0	0	0	—	—	—	—	—
1930–31	Philadelphia Quakers	NHL	4	0	0	0	0	—	—	—	—	—
1930–31	Niagara Falls Cataracts	OPHL	27	9	8	17	23	2	0	0	0	2
1933–34	Ottawa Montagnards	OCHL	10	2	2	4	4	3	1	0	1	0
NHL totals			37	3	2	5	14	—	—	—	—	—
