= D'Arcy Coulson =

Canadian ice hockey defenceman

- Born: February 17, 1908; Sudbury, Ontario, Canada
- Died: April 13, 1996 (aged 88)
- Height: 5 ft 11 in (180 cm)
- Weight: 175 lb (79 kg; 12 st 7 lb)
- Position: Defence
- Shot: Right
- Played for: Philadelphia Quakers
- Playing career: 1927–1931; 1934–1936

John D'Arcy Coulson (February 17, 1908 – April 13, 1996) was a Canadian professional ice hockey defenceman who played one season in the National Hockey League for the Philadelphia Quakers, in 1930–31. The rest of his career, which lasted from 1927 to 1931, and then from 1934 to 1036, was mainly spent in the amateur Ottawa City Hockey League.

He was born in Sudbury, Ontario, he first played for the Ottawa Shamrocks of the OCHL in 1927. He played for the Quakers in the 1930–31 season, scoring no goals in the NHL but ranking third in the league in penalty minutes with 103.

After leaving hockey, Coulson, whose father owned hotels in Sudbury, Ottawa and Hawkesbury and a golf club in Aylmer, Quebec, joined the family business. The hotel in Sudbury, although no longer owned by the Coulson family, is still named the Coulson Hotel.

== Career statistics ==
=== Regular season and playoffs ===
			Regular season					Playoffs
Season	Team	League	GP	G	A	Pts	PIM	GP	G	A	Pts	PIM
1925–26	Loyola College	OHA	—	—	—	—	—	—	—	—	—	—
1926–27	St. Michael's Majors	OHA	6	5	2	7	—	6	0	3	3	—
1927–28	Ottawa Shamrocks	OCHL	15	5	2	7	—	1	0	0	0	0
1928–29	Ottawa Shamrocks	OCHL	5	2	0	2	—	5	1	3	4	8
1929–30	Ottawa Shamrocks	OCHL	20	5	1	6	89	6	2	1	3	26
1929–30	Chicago Shamrocks	USAHA	7	0	6	6	23	—	—	—	—	—
1930–31	Philadelphia Quakers	NHL	28	0	0	0	103	—	—	—	—	—
1934–35	Ottawa RCAF Flyers	OCHL	3	0	0	0	0	5	0	0	0	18
1935–36	Ottawa RCAF Flyers	OCHL	6	0	0	0	5	7	0	1	1	22
NHL totals			28	0	0	0	103	—	—	—	—	—
