= 1930–31 NHL transactions =

The following is a list of all team-to-team transactions that have occurred in the National Hockey League (NHL) during the 1930–31 NHL season. It lists which team each player has been traded to and for which player(s) or other consideration(s), if applicable.

== Transactions ==
May 14, 1930	To New York Americans Frank Carson; Red Dutton; Hap Emms; Mike Neville	To Montreal Maroons $35,000 cash
October 10, 1930	To Toronto Maple Leafs King Clancy	To Ottawa Senators Eric Pettinger; Art Smith $35,000 cash
October 16, 1930	To Boston Bruins Bill Hutton	To Ottawa Senators Harry Connor
November 5, 1930	To Montreal Maroons Lionel Conacher	To New York Americans $35,000 cash
November 6, 1930	To Philadelphia Quakers Wally Kilrea; Al Shields loan of Syd Howe	To Ottawa Senators $35,000 cash
December 7, 1930	To Ottawa Senators rights to Leo Bourgeault	To New York Rangers cash
December 8, 1930	To Boston Bruins Harold Darragh	To Philadelphia Quakers Bill Hutton; Ron Lyons cash
February 12, 1931	To Boston Bruins Ron Lyons	To Philadelphia Quakers cash
