= Aubrey Webster =

Canadian ice hockey player

- Born: September 25, 1910 Kenora, Ontario, Canada
- Died: November 1, 1999 (aged 89) Kenora, Ontario, Canada
- Height: 5 ft 9 in (175 cm)
- Weight: 168 lb (76 kg; 12 st 0 lb)
- Position: Right wing
- Shot: Right
- Played for: Philadelphia Quakers; Montreal Maroons
- Playing career: 1930–1946

Aubrey Webster (September 25, 1910 – November 1, 1999) was a Canadian professional ice hockey right winger who played five games over two seasons in the National Hockey League. In 1930–31 he played one game for the Philadelphia Quakers, and then in 1934–35 played four games for the Montreal Maroons. The rest of Webster's career, which lasted from 1930 to 1946, was spent in various minor leagues.

He was the last surviving former player of the Philadelphia Quakers.

== Career statistics ==
=== Regular season and playoffs ===
			Regular season					Playoffs
Season	Team	League	GP	G	A	Pts	PIM	GP	G	A	Pts	PIM
1930–31	Weyburn Beavers	SSHL	12	9	2	11	8	—	—	—	—	—
1930–31	Philadelphia Quakers	NHL	1	0	0	0	0	—	—	—	—	—
1931–32	Fredericton Capitals	NBSHL	23	15	6	21	6	7	7	1	8	2
1932–33	Moncton Hawks	NBSHL	18	2	2	4	7	3	0	0	0	6
1932–33	Moncton Hawks	Al-Cup	6	2	1	3	2	—	—	—	—	—
1933–34	Moncton Hawks	NBSHL	36	22	9	31	22	3	0	0	0	2
1933–34	Moncton Hawks	Al-Cup	—	—	—	—	—	11	10	1	11	2
1934–35	Montreal Maroons	NHL	4	0	0	0	0	—	—	—	—	—
1934–35	Windsor Buldogs	IHL	37	11	16	27	6	—	—	—	—	—
1935–36	Windsor Bulldogs	IHL	48	13	14	27	15	8	1	1	2	2
1936–37	Spokane Clippers	PCHL	40	9	7	16	32	6	0	2	2	2
1937–38	Spokane Clippers	PCHL	42	11	22	33	49	—	—	—	—	—
1938–39	Portland Buckaroos	PCHL	40	19	16	35	25	5	1	3	4	14
1939–40	Portland Buckaroos	PCHL	22	9	5	14	10	—	—	—	—	—
1939–40	Wichita Skyhawks	AHA	20	3	7	10	2	—	—	—	—	—
1940–41	Spokane Bombers	PCHL	32	9	19	28	14	—	—	—	—	—
1943–44	Portland Oilers	NNDHL	14	15	14	29	4	6	3	6	9	0
1945–46	Portland Eagles	PCHL	57	9	21	30	44	8	2	3	5	2
PCHL totals			233	66	90	156	174	19	3	8	11	18
NHL totals			5	0	0	0	0	—	—	—	—	—
