= 1930–31 Boston Bruins season =

NHL team season

1930–31 Boston Bruins
- American Division champions
- Division: 1st American
- 1930–31 record: 28–10–6
- Home record: 16–1–5
- Road record: 12–9–1
- Goals for: 143
- Goals against: 90

Team information
- General manager: Art Ross
- Coach: Art Ross
- Captain: Lionel Hitchman
- Arena: Boston Garden

Team leaders
- Goals: Cooney Weiland (25)
- Assists: Eddie Shore (16)
- Points: Cooney Weiland (38)
- Penalty minutes: Eddie Shore (105)
- Wins: Tiny Thompson (28)
- Goals against average: Tiny Thompson (1.98)

The 1930–31 Boston Bruins season was the Bruins' seventh season in the NHL. The Bruins repeated as division champions, but lost in the semifinals of the playoffs.

== Regular season ==
=== Final standings ===
American Division
	GP	W	L	T	GF	GA	PTS
**Boston Bruins**	44	28	10	6	143	90	62
**Chicago Black Hawks**	44	24	17	3	108	78	51
**New York Rangers**	44	19	16	9	106	87	47
Detroit Falcons	44	16	21	7	102	105	39
Philadelphia Quakers	44	4	36	4	76	184	12

Note: GP = Games Played, W = Wins, L = Losses, T = Ties, Pts = Points, GF = Goals For, GA = Goals Against
Teams that qualified for the playoffs are highlighted in bold.

=== Record vs. opponents ===
==== Vs. American Division ====
1930–31 NHL records
Team	BOS	CHI	DET	NYR	PHI	Total
Boston	—	2–4	4–1–1	4–0–2	5–0–1	**15–5–4**
Chicago	4–2	—	2–3–1	4–1–1	6–0	**16–6–2**
Detroit	1–4–1	3–2–1	—	2–3–1	4–2	**10–11–3**
N.Y. Rangers	0–4–2	1–4–1	3–2–1	—	6–0	**10–10–4**
Philadelphia	0–5–1	0–6	2–4	0–6	—	**2–21–1**

==== Vs. Canadian Division ====
1930–31 NHL records
Team	MTL	MTM	NYA	OTT	TOR	Total
Boston	1–2–1	3–1	2–2	4–0	2–1–1	**12–6–2**
Chicago	0–3–1	0–4	3–1	4–0	0–4	**7–12–1**
Detroit	2–2	0–3–1	0–2–2	2–2	2–1–1	**6–10–4**
N.Y. Rangers	2–2	2–1–1	1–0–3	3–1	1–2–1	**9–6–5**
Philadelphia	0–3–1	1–3	0–3–1	0–3–1	1–3	**2–15–3**

== Schedule and results ==
1930–31 regular season
November

Game	Result	Date	Score	Opponent	Record
1	W	November 11, 1930	1–0	New York Americans (1930–31)	1–0–0
2	W	November 18, 1930	5–2	Montreal Canadiens (1930–31)	2–0–0
3	L	November 20, 1930	0–1	@ Chicago Black Hawks (1930–31)	2–1–0
4	T	November 23, 1930	2–2 OT	@ Detroit Falcons (1930–31)	2–1–1
5	L	November 25, 1930	3–4 OT	Chicago Black Hawks (1930–31)	2–2–1
6	W	November 27, 1930	2–1	@ Ottawa Senators (1930–31)	3–2–1
7	L	November 29, 1930	2–3	@ Montreal Canadiens (1930–31)	3–3–1

December

Game	Result	Date	Score	Opponent	Record
8	W	December 2, 1930	3–2	Toronto Maple Leafs (1930–31)	4–3–1
9	W	December 6, 1930	4–3	@ Philadelphia Quakers (1930–31)	5–3–1
10	W	December 9, 1930	2–1	Montreal Maroons (1930–31)	6–3–1
11	L	December 11, 1930	1–2	@ New York Americans (1930–31)	6–4–1
12	W	December 13, 1930	7–3	@ Toronto Maple Leafs (1930–31)	7–4–1
13	W	December 16, 1930	3–2	Detroit Falcons (1930–31)	8–4–1
14	W	December 18, 1930	4–2	@ New York Rangers (1930–31)	9–4–1
15	T	December 20, 1930	2–2 OT	New York Rangers (1930–31)	9–4–2
16	W	December 25, 1930	8–0	Philadelphia Quakers (1930–31)	10–4–2
17	W	December 30, 1930	7–3	Ottawa Senators (1930–31)	11–4–2

January

Game	Result	Date	Score	Opponent	Record
18	W	January 1, 1931	4–3 OT	@ New York Rangers (1930–31)	12–4–2
19	L	January 3, 1931	3–5	@ Montreal Maroons (1930–31)	12–5–2
20	W	January 6, 1931	5–2	Chicago Black Hawks (1930–31)	13–5–2
21	W	January 8, 1931	3–1	@ Ottawa Senators (1930–31)	14–5–2
22	W	January 11, 1931	4–1	@ Detroit Falcons (1930–31)	15–5–2
23	T	January 13, 1931	2–2 OT	New York Rangers (1930–31)	15–5–3
24	L	January 15, 1931	0–2	@ Chicago Black Hawks (1930–31)	15–6–3
25	W	January 20, 1931	4–2	Ottawa Senators (1930–31)	16–6–3
26	L	January 22, 1931	1–2	@ New York Americans (1930–31)	16–7–3
27	W	January 24, 1931	4–2	@ Philadelphia Quakers (1930–31)	17–7–3
28	T	January 27, 1931	3–3 OT	Philadelphia Quakers (1930–31)	17–7–4
29	W	January 29, 1931	4–3	@ New York Rangers (1930–31)	18–7–4

February

Game	Result	Date	Score	Opponent	Record
30	W	February 3, 1931	7–2	Detroit Falcons (1930–31)	19–7–4
31	W	February 7, 1931	2–1	@ Montreal Canadiens (1930–31)	20–7–4
32	W	February 10, 1931	2–1 OT	Chicago Black Hawks (1930–31)	21–7–4
33	W	February 14, 1931	4–2	@ Montreal Maroons (1930–31)	22–7–4
34	W	February 17, 1931	2–0	New York Americans (1930–31)	23–7–4
35	T	February 19, 1931	1–1 OT	Montreal Canadiens (1930–31)	23–7–5
36	L	February 21, 1931	2–4	@ Toronto Maple Leafs (1930–31)	23–8–5
37	W	February 24, 1931	5–1	@ Philadelphia Quakers (1930–31)	24–8–5

March

Game	Result	Date	Score	Opponent	Record
38	W	March 3, 1931	4–1	New York Rangers (1930–31)	25–8–5
39	W	March 7, 1931	7–2	Philadelphia Quakers (1930–31)	26–8–5
40	T	March 10, 1931	3–3 OT	Toronto Maple Leafs (1930–31)	26–8–6
41	L	March 12, 1931	2–3	@ Chicago Black Hawks (1930–31)	26–9–6
42	L	March 15, 1931	2–5 OT	@ Detroit Falcons (1930–31)	26–10–6
43	W	March 17, 1931	4–2	Detroit Falcons (1930–31)	27–10–6
44	W	March 21, 1931	3–1	Montreal Maroons (1930–31)	28–10–6

Legend: Win (2 points) Loss (0 points) Tie (1 point)

== Playoffs ==
The Boston Bruins lost to the Montreal Canadiens in the semifinals 3–2.

== Player statistics ==
=== Regular season ===
Scoring

Player	Pos	GP	G	A	Pts	PIM
Cooney Weiland	C	44	25	13	38	14
Marty Barry	C	44	20	11	31	26
Eddie Shore	D	44	15	16	31	105
Dit Clapper	RW/D	43	22	8	30	50
Harry Oliver	RW	44	16	14	30	18
George Owen	D	38	12	13	25	33
Red Beattie	LW	32	10	11	21	25
Art Chapman	C	44	7	7	14	22
Dutch Gainor	C	35	8	3	11	14
Harold Darragh	LW	25	2	4	6	4
Henry Harris	RW	32	2	4	6	20
Percy Galbraith	LW/D	43	2	3	5	28
Jack Pratt	C/D	32	2	0	2	36
Lionel Hitchman	D	41	0	2	2	40
Bill Hutton	D/RW	9	0	0	0	2
Ron Lyons	LW	14	0	0	0	19
Paul Runge	C/LW	1	0	0	0	0
Tiny Thompson	G	44	0	0	0	0

Goaltending

Player	MIN	GP	W	L	T	GA	GAA	SO
Tiny Thompson	2730	44	28	10	6	90	1.98	3
Team:	2730	44	28	10	6	90	1.98	3

=== Playoffs ===
The Boston Bruins lost to the Montreal Canadiens 3–2 in the semi-finals.

Scoring

Player	Pos	GP	G	A	Pts	PIM
Cooney Weiland	C	5	6	3	9	2
Dit Clapper	RW/D	5	2	4	6	4
George Owen	D	5	2	3	5	13
Eddie Shore	D	5	2	1	3	24
Marty Barry	C	5	1	1	2	4
Art Chapman	C	5	0	1	1	7
Harold Darragh	LW	5	0	1	1	2
Dutch Gainor	C	5	0	1	1	2
Red Beattie	LW	4	0	0	0	0
Percy Galbraith	LW/D	5	0	0	0	6
Lionel Hitchman	D	5	0	0	0	0
Ron Lyons	LW	5	0	0	0	0
Harry Oliver	RW	4	0	0	0	2
Jack Pratt	C/D	4	0	0	0	0
Tiny Thompson	G	5	0	0	0	0

Goaltending

Player	MIN	GP	W	L	GA	GAA	SO
Tiny Thompson	343	5	2	3	13	2.27	0
Team:	343	5	2	3	13	2.27	0

Note:

Pos = Position;GP = Games played; G = Goals; A = Assists; Pts = Points; PIM = Penalty minutes; +/- = Plus/minus; PPG = Power-play goals; SHG = Short-handed goals; GWG = Game-winning goals
Pos = Position;GP = Games played; Min, TOI = Minutes played; W = Wins; L = Losses; T,T/OT = Ties; OTL = Overtime losses; GA = Goals-against; GAA = Goals-against average; SO = Shutouts; SA = Shots against; SV = Shots saved;SV% = Save percentage;

== See also ==
- 1930–31 NHL season
