= Stan Crossett =

Canadian ice hockey player (1903–1992)

- Born: April 26, 1903 Tillsonburg, Ontario, Canada
- Died: July 26, 1992 (aged 89)
- Height: 6 ft 0 in (183 cm)
- Weight: 200 lb (91 kg; 14 st 4 lb)
- Position: Defence
- Shot: Right
- Played for: Philadelphia Quakers
- Playing career: 1929–1931

Stanley Roy Crossett (April 26, 1903 – July 26, 1992) was a Canadian professional ice hockey defenceman who played one season in the National Hockey League for the Philadelphia Quakers in 1930–31. He played 21 games and did not score a point, though registered 10 penalty minutes.

== Career statistics ==
=== Regular season and playoffs ===
			Regular season					Playoffs
Season	Team	League	GP	G	A	Pts	PIM	GP	G	A	Pts	PIM
1929–30	Port Hope Eagles	OHA Sr	—	—	—	—	—	—	—	—	—	—
1930–31	Philadelphia Quakers	NHL	21	0	0	0	10	—	—	—	—	—
NHL totals			21	0	0	0	10	—	—	—	—	—
