= Herbert Hamel =

Canadian ice hockey player

- Born: June 8, 1904; New Hamburg, Ontario, Canada
- Died: April 20, 2001 (aged 96); Kitchener, Ontario, Canada
- Height: 5 ft 11 in (180 cm)
- Weight: 155 lb (70 kg; 11 st 1 lb)
- Position: Right wing
- Shot: Right
- Played for: Toronto Maple Leafs
- Playing career: 1926–1935

Herbert Alexander "Herb, Hap" Hamel (June 8, 1904 – April 20, 2001) was a Canadian professional ice hockey player who played two games in the National Hockey League with the Toronto Maple Leafs during the 1930–31 season. The rest of his career, which lasted from 1926 to 1935, was spent in the minor leagues. Hamel was born in New Hamburg, Ontario.

== Career statistics ==
=== Regular season and playoffs ===
			Regular season					Playoffs
Season	Team	League	GP	G	A	Pts	PIM	GP	G	A	Pts	PIM
1926–27	Stratford Nationals	Can-Pro	16	3	1	4	4	—	—	—	—	—
1926–27	Niagara Falls Cataracts	Can-Pro	15	3	1	4	2	—	—	—	—	—
1927–28	Hamilton Tigers	Can-Pro	1	0	0	0	0	—	—	—	—	—
1928–29	Hamilton Tigers	Can-Pro	38	10	2	12	27	—	—	—	—	—
1929–30	Brantford Indians	Can-Pro	28	13	7	20	37	—	—	—	—	—
1930–31	Toronto Maple Leafs	NHL	2	0	0	0	4	—	—	—	—	—
1930–31	Stratford Indians	OPHL	9	5	1	6	6	—	—	—	—	—
1930–31	Oshawa Patricias	OPHL	18	9	10	19	8	7	3	3	6	0
1934–35	Oshawa Chevies	TMHL	12	1	1	2	2	—	—	—	—	—
Can-Pro totals			98	29	11	40	70	—	—	—	—	—
NHL totals			2	0	0	0	4	—	—	—	—	—
