= Alfred Lépine =

Canadian ice hockey player

- Born: July 30, 1901 Sainte-Anne-de-Bellevue, Quebec, Canada
- Died: August 2, 1955 (aged 54) Sainte-Rose, Quebec, Canada
- Height: 5 ft 11 in (180 cm)
- Weight: 168 lb (76 kg; 12 st 0 lb)
- Position: Centre
- Shot: Left
- Played for: Montreal Canadiens
- Playing career: 1925–1939

Joseph Alfred Pierre Hormisdas "Pit" Lépine (July 30, 1901 – August 2, 1955) was a Canadian ice hockey forward and coach. He was born in Sainte-Anne-de-Bellevue, Quebec.

Lepine played in the National Hockey League from 1925 to 1939, spending his entire career with the Montreal Canadiens, winning two Stanley Cups, in 1930 and 1931. Lepine, a center, played over 500 games with Montreal and was an excellent goal scorer who could also check and battle for the puck in the corners. Lepine still holds the NHL record for the most goals without an assist in a season, with 16 scored in 1926-27.

He had played senior hockey in Montreal with the Royals, Hochelega and Nationale squads.

After 13 years in the NHL, Lepine finally played a year in the minors with the New Haven Eagles of the AHL in 1938–39.

When Babe Siebert drowned in 1939 after being named the coach of the Canadiens, Lepine was named coach for the 1939–40 season. The erosion of talent from older players and failure to bring in adequate youngsters doomed the team to a last place finish that season and he was fired and replaced by Dick Irvin, who would rebuild the team.

Pit suffered a paralytic stroke in 1951, and had two more strokes in 1954. He died August 2, 1955, in a convalescent home in Ste-Rose, Quebec, from effects of these strokes, only three days after he turned 54. Alfred was the brother of Hector Lépine.

== Career statistics ==
			Regular season					Playoffs
Season	Team	League	GP	G	A	Pts	PIM	GP	G	A	Pts	PIM
1922–23	Montreal Royals	MCHL	4	2	0	2	—	—	—	—	—	—
1922–23	Montreal Shamrocks	MCHL	1	1	0	1	2	—	—	—	—	—
1923–24	Montreal Hochelaga	MCHL	9	3	0	3	2	—	—	—	—	—
1924–25	Montreal Nationale	ECHL	15	8	0	8	—	—	—	—	—	—
1925–26	Montreal Canadiens	NHL	27	9	1	10	18	—	—	—	—	—
1925–26	Montreal Nationale	ECHL	3	2	0	2	0	—	—	—	—	—
1926–27	Montreal Canadiens	NHL	44	16	1	17	20	4	0	0	0	4
1927–28	Montreal Canadiens	NHL	20	4	1	5	6	1	0	0	0	0
1928–29	Montreal Canadiens	NHL	44	6	1	7	48	3	0	0	0	2
1929–30	Montreal Canadiens	NHL	44	24	9	33	47	6	2	2	4	6
1930–31	Montreal Canadiens	NHL	44	17	7	24	63	10	4	2	6	6
1931–32	Montreal Canadiens	NHL	48	19	11	30	42	3	1	0	1	4
1932–33	Montreal Canadiens	NHL	46	8	8	16	45	2	0	0	0	2
1933–34	Montreal Canadiens	NHL	48	10	8	18	44	2	0	0	0	0
1934–35	Montreal Canadiens	NHL	48	12	19	31	16	2	0	0	0	2
1935–36	Montreal Canadiens	NHL	32	6	10	16	4	—	—	—	—	—
1936–37	Montreal Canadiens	NHL	34	7	8	15	15	5	0	1	1	0
1937–38	Montreal Canadiens	NHL	47	5	14	19	24	3	0	0	0	0
1938–39	New Haven Eagles	IAHL	52	8	23	31	16	—	—	—	—	—
NHL totals			526	143	98	241	392	41	7	5	12	26

== NHL coaching record ==
Team	Year	Regular season						Postseason
Team	Year	G	W	L	T	Pts	Division rank	Result
Montreal Canadiens	1939-40	48	10	33	5	25	7th in NHL	Missed playoffs

== See also ==
- List of players with 5 or more goals in an NHL game

Preceded by Albert "Babe" Siebert	Head Coach of the Montreal Canadiens; 1939–40	Succeeded by Dick Irvin
