= 1930–31 Chicago Black Hawks season =

NHL ice hockey team season

1930–31 Chicago Black Hawks
- Division: 2nd American
- 1930–31 record: 24–17–3
- Home record: 13–8–1
- Road record: 11–9–2
- Goals for: 108
- Goals against: 78

Team information
- General manager: Frederic McLaughlin
- Coach: Dick Irvin
- Captain: Ty Arbour
- Arena: Chicago Stadium

Team leaders
- Goals: Johnny Gottselig (20)
- Assists: Tom Cook (14)
- Points: Johnny Gottselig (32)
- Penalty minutes: Taffy Abel (45)
- Wins: Chuck Gardiner (24)
- Goals against average: Chuck Gardiner (1.73)

The 1930–31 Chicago Black Hawks season was the team's fifth season in the NHL, and they were coming off a surprising season, in which they finished over .500 for the first time in team history, and making the playoffs after a two-year absence. The Hawks would go on to lose to the Montreal Canadiens in the first round. Prior to the season, Chicago would name former team captain and player-coach Dick Irvin as the head coach. The team responded with a club record 24 wins and 51 points, and finished in second place in the American Division, and make the playoffs for the 2nd straight season.

== Regular season ==
Chicago was led offensively once again by Johnny Gottselig, who scored a club high 20 goals and 32 points, and by Tom Cook, who was the team leader in assists with 14, and finished 2nd in team scoring with 29 points. Frank Ingram would have a big season, scoring a career high 17 goals.

In goal, Chuck Gardiner would play in every game, and he would break the Hawks record for wins (24), shutouts (12) and GAA (1.73). The Hawks finished with the 2nd fewest goals against in the league.

=== Season standings ===
American Division
	GP	W	L	T	GF	GA	PTS
**Boston Bruins**	44	28	10	6	143	90	62
**Chicago Black Hawks**	44	24	17	3	108	78	51
**New York Rangers**	44	19	16	9	106	87	47
Detroit Falcons	44	16	21	7	102	105	39
Philadelphia Quakers	44	4	36	4	76	184	12

Note: GP = Games Played, W = Wins, L = Losses, T = Ties, Pts = Points, GF = Goals For, GA = Goals Against
Teams that qualified for the playoffs are highlighted in bold.

=== Record vs. opponents ===
==== Vs. American Division ====
1930–31 NHL records
Team	**BOS**	**CHI**	**DET**	**NYR**	**PHI**	**Total**
Boston	—	2–4	4–1–1	4–0–2	5–0–1	**15–5–4**
Chicago	4–2	—	2–3–1	4–1–1	6–0	**16–6–2**
Detroit	1–4–1	3–2–1	—	2–3–1	4–2	**10–11–3**
N.Y. Rangers	0–4–2	1–4–1	3–2–1	—	6–0	**10–10–4**
Philadelphia	0–5–1	0–6	2–4	0–6	—	**2–21–1**

==== Vs. Canadian Division ====
1930–31 NHL records
Team	**MTL**	**MTM**	**NYA**	**OTT**	**TOR**	**Total**
Boston	1–2–1	3–1	2–2	4–0	2–1–1	**12–6–2**
Chicago	0–3–1	0–4	3–1	4–0	0–4	**7–12–1**
Detroit	2–2	0–3–1	0–2–2	2–2	2–1–1	**6–10–4**
N.Y. Rangers	2–2	2–1–1	1–0–3	3–1	1–2–1	**9–6–5**
Philadelphia	0–3–1	1–3	0–3–1	0–3–1	1–3	**2–15–3**

== Schedule and results ==
1930–31 regular season
November

Game	Date	Visitor	Score	Home	Record	Points
1	November 16	New York Rangers	1–1	Chicago Black Hawks	0–0–1	1
2	November 20	Boston Bruins	0–1	Chicago Black Hawks	1–0–1	3
3	November 23	Montreal Canadiens	0–3	Chicago Black Hawks	2–0–1	5
4	November 25	Chicago Black Hawks	4–3	Boston Bruins	3–0–1	7
5	November 27	Chicago Black Hawks	4–0	New York Rangers	4–0–1	9
6	November 29	Chicago Black Hawks	3–0	Ottawa Senators	5–0–1	11

December

Game	Date	Visitor	Score	Home	Record	Points
7	December 2	Chicago Black Hawks	1–2	Montreal Maroons	5–1–1	11
8	December 4	New York Americans	2–4	Chicago Black Hawks	6–1–1	13
9	December 7	Detroit Falcons	2–3	Chicago Black Hawks	7–1–1	15
10	December 9	Chicago Black Hawks	0–1	Detroit Falcons	7–2–1	15
11	December 14	Montreal Maroons	2–0	Chicago Black Hawks	7–3–1	15
12	December 16	Ottawa Senators	2–4	Chicago Black Hawks	8–3–1	17
13	December 18	Chicago Black Hawks	0–0	Montreal Canadiens	8–3–2	18
14	December 20	Chicago Black Hawks	1–3	Toronto Maple Leafs	8–4–2	18
15	December 23	Chicago Black Hawks	3–2	Philadelphia Quakers	9–4–2	20
16	December 28	Toronto Maple Leafs	3–2	Chicago Black Hawks	9–5–2	20

January

Game	Date	Visitor	Score	Home	Record	Points
17	January 1	Philadelphia Quakers	3–10	Chicago Black Hawks	10–5–2	22
18	January 4	Detroit Falcons	2–1	Chicago Black Hawks	10–6–2	22
19	January 6	Chicago Black Hawks	2–5	Boston Bruins	10–7–2	22
20	January 8	Chicago Black Hawks	4–0	Philadelphia Quakers	11–7–2	24
21	January 11	Chicago Black Hawks	2–0	New York Rangers	12–7–2	26
22	January 13	Chicago Black Hawks	1–0	New York Americans	13–7–2	28
23	January 15	Boston Bruins	0–2	Chicago Black Hawks	14–7–2	30
24	January 18	New York Rangers	1–2	Chicago Black Hawks	15–7–2	32
25	January 22	Philadelphia Quakers	2–5	Chicago Black Hawks	16–7–2	34
26	January 25	Montreal Maroons	3–2	Chicago Black Hawks	16–8–2	34

February

Game	Date	Visitor	Score	Home	Record	Points
27	February 1	Montreal Canadiens	4–2	Chicago Black Hawks	16–9–2	34
28	February 5	Philadelphia Quakers	1–6	Chicago Black Hawks	17–9–2	36
29	February 8	Chicago Black Hawks	3–2	New York Rangers	18–9–2	38
30	February 10	Chicago Black Hawks	1–2	Boston Bruins	18–10–2	38
31	February 12	Chicago Black Hawks	3–2	Ottawa Senators	19–10–2	40
32	February 15	New York Rangers	2–1	Chicago Black Hawks	19–11–2	40
33	February 19	Detroit Falcons	5–4	Chicago Black Hawks	19–12–2	40
34	February 22	Chicago Black Hawks	1–1	Detroit Falcons	19–12–3	41
35	February 24	Chicago Black Hawks	2–3	Montreal Maroons	19–13–3	41

March

Game	Date	Visitor	Score	Home	Record	Points
36	March 1	Ottawa Senators	0–5	Chicago Black Hawks	20–13–3	43
37	March 5	New York Americans	0–1	Chicago Black Hawks	21–13–3	45
38	March 8	Chicago Black Hawks	1–2	New York Americans	21–14–3	45
39	March 10	Chicago Black Hawks	1–2	Montreal Canadiens	21–15–3	45
40	March 12	Boston Bruins	2–3	Chicago Black Hawks	22–15–3	47
41	March 15	Toronto Maple Leafs	2–1	Chicago Black Hawks	22–16–3	47
42	March 17	Chicago Black Hawks	4–0	Philadelphia Quakers	23–16–3	49
43	March 19	Chicago Black Hawks	2–8	Toronto Maple Leafs	23–17–3	49
44	March 22	Chicago Black Hawks	2–1	Detroit Falcons	24–17–3	51

Legend: Win (2 points) Loss (0 points) Tie (1 point)

== Playoffs ==
The Hawks would open the playoffs in a two-game total-goals series against the Toronto Maple Leafs, and for the first time in team history, the Black Hawks won the series by a score of 4–3. Next up was a two-game total-goals series against the New York Rangers, and Chuck Gardiner would shine by shutting New York out in both games, as the Hawks won the series by a 3–0 score and earn a berth in the Stanley Cup Finals against the Montreal Canadiens. The Hawks would lose the first game of the best-of-five series, but then would win two in a row in overtime to take a 2–1 series lead. Montreal would respond with a 4–2 victory in game four, and then the Canadiens would put away the Black Hawks with a 2–0 win in the fifth and deciding game, ending the Black Hawks dream of winning the championship one win short.

=== Black Hawks 4, Maple Leafs 3 ===
==== NHL quarter-finals ====
===== (A2) Chicago Black Hawks vs. (C3) Toronto Maple Leafs =====
March 24	Chicago Black Hawks	2 – 2	Toronto Maple Leafs	Mutual Street Arena	Recap
March (1) – (Cook) – 16:59		First period	11:53 – Bailey (1) – (Day)
March (2) – (Adams) – 11:22		Second period	12:11 – Blair (1) – (Day, Bailey)
No scoring		Third period	No scoring
Gardiner (0-0-1)		Goalie stats	Chabot (0-0-1)

March 26	Toronto Maple Leafs	1 – 2	OT	Chicago Black Hawks	Chicago Stadium	Recap
No scoring		First period		17:15 – Ripley (1) – (Gottselig, Couture)
No scoring		Second period		No scoring
Clancy (1) – (Conacher, Day) – 17:00		Third period		No scoring
No scoring		First overtime period		19:20 – Adams (1) – (Cook, March)
Chabot (0-1-1)		Goalie stats		Gardiner (1-0-1)

Chicago wins series 4 – 3

=== Black Hawks 3, Rangers 0 ===
==== NHL semi-finals ====
===== (A2) Chicago Black Hawks vs. (A3) New York Rangers =====
March 29	New York Rangers	0 – 2	Chicago Black Hawks	Chicago Stadium	Recap
No scoring		First period	12:25 – Gottselig (1) – (Romnes)
No scoring		Second period	No scoring
No scoring		Third period	4:36 – Romnes (1) – (Couture)
Roach (2-1-0)		Goalie stats	Gardiner (2-0-1)

March 31	Chicago Black Hawks	1 – 0	New York Rangers	Madison Square Garden	Recap
No scoring		First period	No scoring
No scoring		Second period	No scoring
Cook (1) – (Wentworth, Adams) – 5:30		Third period	No scoring
Gardiner (3-0-1)		Goalie stats	Roach (2-2-0)

Chicago wins series 3 – 0

=== Canadiens 3, Black Hawks 2 ===
==== Stanley Cup finals ====
===== (C1) Montreal Canadiens vs. (A2) Chicago Black Hawks =====
April 3	Montreal Canadiens	2 – 1	Chicago Black Hawks	Chicago Stadium	Recap
Mantha (4) – (Gagnon) – 4:50		First period	No scoring
Lépine (2) – (Unassisted) – 2:20		Second period	8:30 – Ripley (2) – (Gottselig, Couture)
No scoring		Third period	No scoring
Hainsworth (4-2-0)		Goalie stats	Gardiner (3-1-1)

April 5	Montreal Canadiens	1 – 2	2OT	Chicago Black Hawks	Chicago Stadium	Recap
No scoring		First period		No scoring
No scoring		Second period		11:45 – Adams (2) – (Unassisted)
Wasnie (3) – (Larochelle) – 12:10		Third period		No scoring
No scoring		Second overtime period		4:50 – Gottselig (2) – (Unassisted)
Hainsworth (4-3-0)		Goalie stats		Gardiner (4-1-1)

April 9	Chicago Black Hawks	3 – 2	3OT	Montreal Canadiens	Montreal Forum	Recap
No scoring		First period		5:15 – Gagnon (3) – (Burke, Mantha)
No scoring		Second period		7:29 – Mantha (5) – (Lépine)
March (3) – (Gottselig) – 16:20; Adams (3) – (Cook) – 17:07		Third period		No scoring
Wentworth (1) – (Adams) – 13:50		Third overtime period		No scoring
Gardiner (5-1-1)		Goalie stats		Hainsworth (4-4-0)

April 11	Chicago Black Hawks	2 – 4	Montreal Canadiens	Montreal Forum	Recap
Gottselig (3) – (Ripley) – 1:33; Arbour (1) – (Ingram) – 13:58		First period	No scoring
No scoring		Second period	4:34 – Gagnon (4) – (Leduc)
No scoring		Third period	4:25 – Gagnon (5) – (Wasnie); 10:55 – Lépine (3) – (Gagnon; 17:25 – Lépine (4) – Joliat)
Gardiner (5-2-1)		Goalie stats	Hainsworth (5-4-0)

April 14	Chicago Black Hawks	0 – 2	Montreal Canadiens	Montreal Forum	Recap
No scoring		First period	No scoring
No scoring		Second period	9:59 – Gagnon (6) – (Joliat)
No scoring		Third period	15:27 – Morenz (1) – (Unassisted)
Gardiner (5-3-1)		Goalie stats	Hainsworth (6-4-0)

Montreal wins series 3 – 2

== Player statistics ==
=== Scoring leaders ===
Player	GP	G	A	Pts	PIM
Johnny Gottselig	42	20	12	32	14
Tom Cook	44	15	14	29	34
Frank Ingram	44	17	4	21	37
Lolo Couture	44	8	11	19	30
Stewart Adams	36	5	13	18	18

=== Goaltending ===
Player	GP	TOI	W	L	T	GA	SO	GAA
Chuck Gardiner	44	2710	24	17	3	78	12	1.73
Alex Wood	0	0	0	0	0	0	0	0

== Playoff stats ==
=== Scoring leaders ===
Player	GP	G	A	Pts	PIM
Stewart Adams	8	3	3	6	8
Johnny Gottselig	9	3	3	6	2
Mush March	9	3	1	4	11
Tom Cook	9	1	3	4	11
Vic Ripley	9	2	1	3	4

=== Goaltending ===
Player	GP	TOI	W	L	T	GA	SO	GAA
Chuck Gardiner	9	638	5	3	1	14	2	1.32
Alex Wood	0	0	0	0	0	0	0	0
