= Philadelphia Quakers (NHL) =

Ice hockey team

- Founded: 1925
- History: Pittsburgh Pirates; 1925–1930; Philadelphia Quakers; 1930–1931
- Home arena: Philadelphia Arena
- City: Philadelphia, Pennsylvania
- Team colors: Black, orange, white

The Philadelphia Quakers were a professional ice hockey team that played only one full season in the National Hockey League (NHL), 1930–31, at the Philadelphia Arena in Philadelphia. They were the successors of the Pittsburgh Pirates.

== History ==
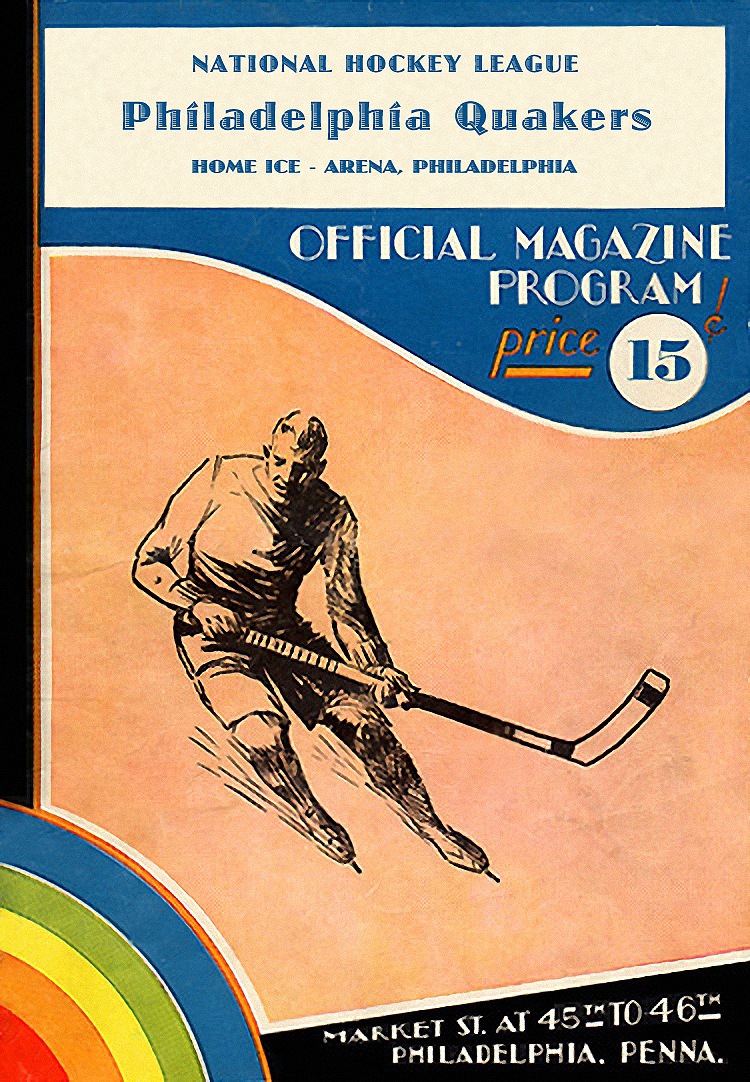
Phila. Quakers program

The Pirates, the third American-based NHL team, got off to a promising start in the 1925–26 season, making the playoffs in two of their first three seasons. However, the team soon fell on hard times both on the ice and at the box office. A sale to bootlegger Bill Dwyer did not help the cause. With the Wall Street crash of 1929 followed by the Great Depression, the owners found themselves having to sell off their star players to make ends meet. By the end of the 1929–30 season, the team was $400,000 in debt. Additionally, their arena the Duquesne Garden, was not suitable for an NHL team. It had been built in 1890 and was at the end of its useful life; with only 5,000 seats (standing room to 8,000), it was by far the smallest in the league.

Boxing promoter Benny Leonard, Dwyer's front man, then requested permission to temporarily move to Philadelphia as the Quakers (from the historical importance of the Quaker religious community in the founding of Philadelphia and Pennsylvania) until a new arena was built in Pittsburgh.

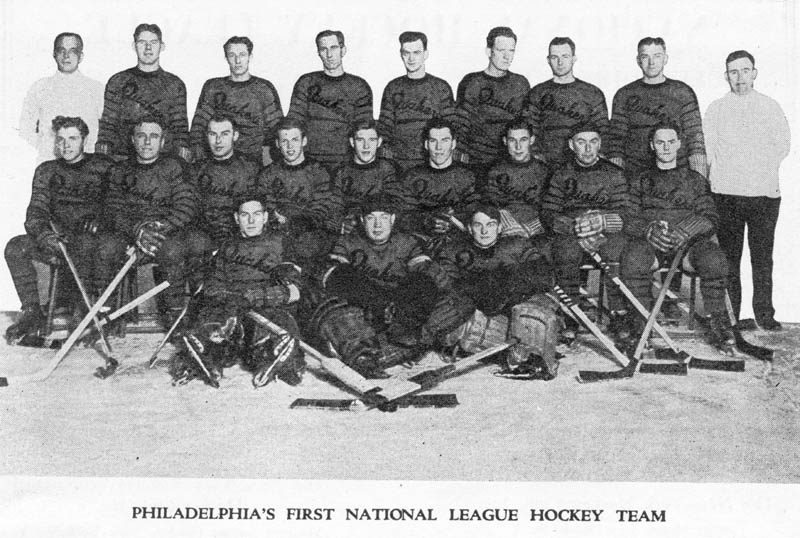
1930–31 Philadelphia Quakers

Things did not get better on the other side of Pennsylvania. The financial woes continued unabated. On the ice, the Quakers were the definition of futility. It took the team three games to score a goal and three more to get its first win, which came on November 25, 1930, a 2–1 win over the visiting Toronto Maple Leafs. They finished with a horrendous 4–36–4 record. The .136 winning percentage was the lowest in NHL history, a record that would stand for 45 years until the Washington Capitals finished with a .131 winning percentage in the 1974–75 season. The four wins tied the 1919–20 Quebec Bulldogs for the fewest wins in NHL history for a team that played a full season. They had the worst offense (76 goals for) and worst defense (184 goals against) in the league. At the end of the 1930–31 season, the Quakers, along with the Ottawa Senators, announced that they would not field a team for the 1931–32 season, leaving Philadelphia without an NHL team until the arrival of the Flyers in 1967. The Flyers would adopt the orange and black colors used by the Quakers, though ironically because they used the colors of the Texas Longhorns as inspiration.

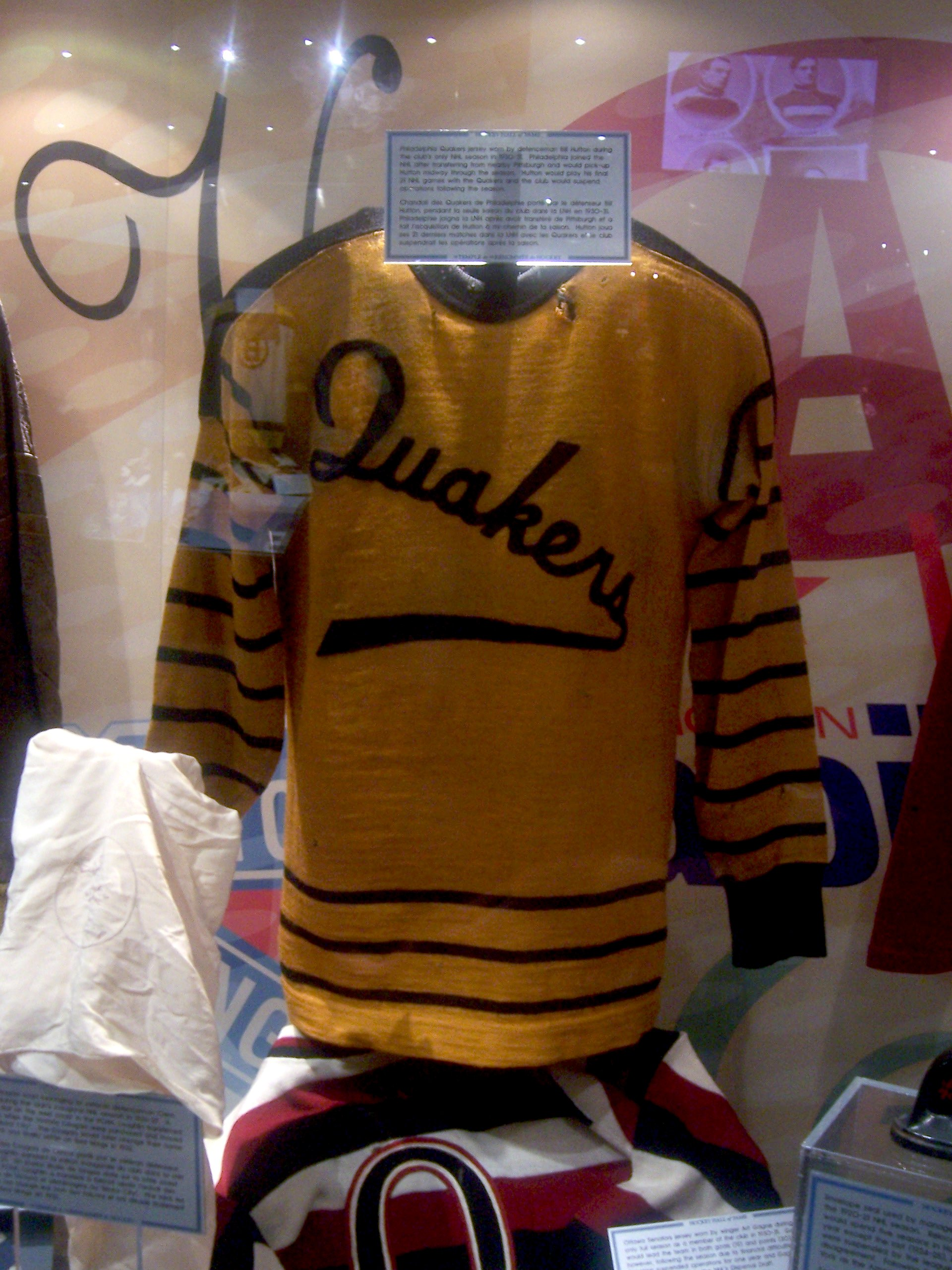
Quakers jersey in the Hockey Hall of Fame.

While the Senators came back for two years before moving to St. Louis, the Quakers franchise never iced a team again. At each of the next five season-opening NHL governors meetings, they announced that they were suspending operations for that season. They officially canceled the franchise on May 7, 1936, when it became clear that a new arena would not be built in Pittsburgh in the near future. Pittsburgh would not see a new arena until 1961, when the Civic Arena was constructed. The NHL returned to Pittsburgh the same year it returned to Philadelphia with the arrival of the Penguins.

== Season-by-season record ==
Note: GP = Games played, W = Wins, L = Losses, T = Ties, OTL = Overtime losses, Pts = Points, GF = Goals for, GA = Goals against, PIM = Penalties in minutes

NHL season	Quakers season	GP	W	L	T	Pts	GF	GA	PIM	Finish	Playoffs
Relocated from Pittsburgh
1930–31	1930–31	44	4	36	4	12	76	184	477	5th, American	Did not qualify

=== Standings ===
American Division
	GP	W	L	T	GF	GA	PTS
**Boston Bruins**	44	28	10	6	143	90	62
**Chicago Black Hawks**	44	24	17	3	108	78	51
**New York Rangers**	44	19	16	9	106	87	47
Detroit Falcons	44	16	21	7	102	105	39
Philadelphia Quakers	44	4	36	4	76	184	12

Note: GP = Games Played, W = Wins, L = Losses, T = Ties, Pts = Points, GF = Goals For, GA = Goals Against
Teams that qualified for the playoffs are highlighted in bold.

== Players ==
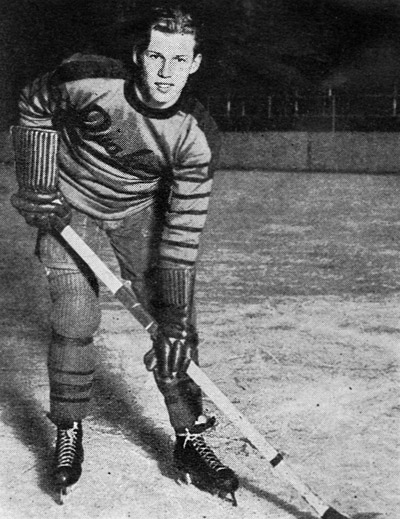
Rookie center Syd Howe

23 players – three goaltenders and 20 skaters – played for the Quakers during their lone season of existence. Syd Howe, who played his first full NHL season with the Quakers, was the last active Quaker playing his final NHL games with the Detroit Red Wings during the 1945–46 season. Howe was also the only Quakers' player inducted into the Hockey Hall of Fame. Quakers' coach Cooper Smeaton was inducted in the Hall of Fame in 1961 as an on-ice official based on his two decades as the NHL's Referee in Chief and he also served as Trustee of the Stanley Cup from 1946 until 1978. Hib Milks was the Quakers' only captain.

Aubrey Webster was the last surviving Quaker, dying in 1999.

Key

- Hockey Hall of Famer
- Position abbreviations: C = Center; D = Defense; F = Forward; G = Goaltender; LW = Left wing; RW = Right wing

=== Skaters ===
		Regular season				
Player	Pos	GP	G	A	Pts	PIM
Cliff Barton	R	43	6	7	13	18
D'arcy Coulson	D	28	0	0	0	103
Stan Crossett	D	21	0	0	0	10
Harold Darragh	L	10	1	1	2	2
Herb Drury	D	24	0	2	2	10
Gord Fraser	D	5	0	0	0	22
Syd Howe (1965)	C	44	9	11	20	20
Bill Hutton	D	21	1	1	2	4
James Jarvis	L	44	5	7	12	30
Wally Kilrea	R	44	8	12	20	22
Gerry Lowrey	L	43	13	14	27	27
Ron Lyons	L	22	2	4	6	8
Rennison Manners	C	4	0	0	0	0
Eddie McCalmon	R	16	3	0	3	6
John McKinnon	D	39	1	1	2	46
Hib Milks	L	44	17	6	23	42
Al Shields	D	43	7	3	10	98
Rodger Smith	D	9	0	0	0	0
Aubrey Webster	R	1	0	0	0	0
Tex White	R	9	3	0	3	2

=== Goaltenders ===
	Regular season						
Player	GP	W	L	T	SO	GAA	SV%
Wilf Cude	30	2	25	3	1	4.22	—
Jake Forbes	2	0	2	0	0	3.5	—
Joe Miller	12	2	9	1	0	3.81	—

=== Team captain ===
- Hib Milks

== See also ==
- Pittsburgh Pirates (NHL)
- 1930–31 Philadelphia Quakers season
