= 1930–31 NHL season =

Professional ice hockey league season

- League: National Hockey League
- Sport: Ice hockey
- Duration: November 11, 1930 – April 14, 1931
- Games: 44
- Teams: 10

Regular season
- Season champions: Boston Bruins
- Season MVP: Howie Morenz (Canadiens)
- Top scorer: Howie Morenz (Canadiens)
- Canadian Division champions: Montreal Canadiens
- American Division champions: Boston Bruins

Stanley Cup
- Champions: Montreal Canadiens
- Runners-up: Chicago Black Hawks

NHL seasons
- ← 1929–30 1931–32 →

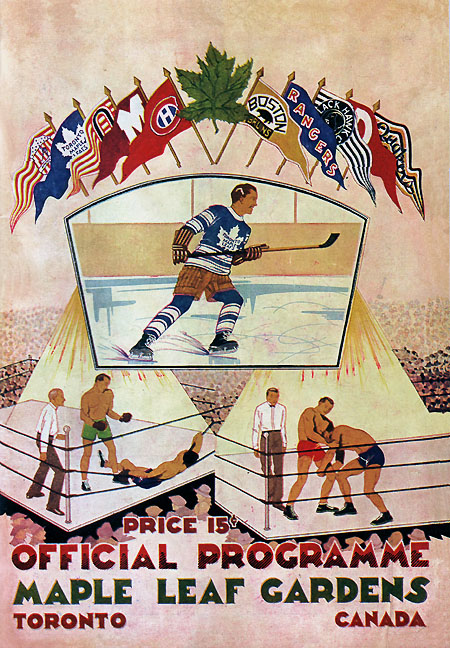
Toronto Maple Leafs program from the first game at Maple Leaf Gardens, November 12, 1931

The 1930–31 NHL season was the 14th season of the National Hockey League. Ten teams played 44 games each. The Pittsburgh Pirates moved to Philadelphia and became the Philadelphia Quakers, while the Detroit team was renamed the Detroit Falcons. The Montreal Canadiens beat the Chicago Black Hawks three games to two in the best-of-five Stanley Cup Finals for their second consecutive Stanley Cup victory.

== League business ==
The Great Depression was starting to take its toll on the NHL. In attempts to solve financial problems, the Pittsburgh Pirates moved to Philadelphia and became the Philadelphia Quakers, but there was nothing about the team to win games or fans. It was intended that the team stay in Philadelphia only until a new arena was built in Pittsburgh. The arena was never built, and the team folded after only one season in the new city. The state of Pennsylvania would be without an NHL team until the league doubled in size 36 years later.

The Ottawa Senators were in a similar financial boat but instead of relocating, they sold a star asset and future Hall of Famer, King Clancy, to the Toronto Maple Leafs for $35,000 and two players. Even after the sale of Clancy, the Senators' owners put the team up for sale for $200,000, although no bids approached anywhere near that figure. The team would suspend operations before the start of the next season.

The Detroit Cougars changed the team name to the Detroit Falcons.

The Canadian Amateur Hockey Association (CAHA) sent W. A. Fry and W. A. Hewitt to the 1930 NHL general meeting to seek a better working agreement. The CAHA suggested that players remain as amateurs for one season after graduating from junior ice hockey, and in return the CAHA would permit its amateurs to tryout and practice with professional teams. Hewitt subsequently met multiple times with NHL president Frank Calder, who saw merit in Hewitt's request to keep players in amateur hockey, and continued to discuss having a professional-amateur agreement.

== Arena changes ==
The relocated Philadelphia Quakers moved from Pittsburgh's Duquesne Garden to Philadelphia Arena.

== Regular season ==
Howie Morenz led the league in scoring.

Dick Irvin started his career in coaching with Chicago and they finished second in the American Division. He resigned at season's end after having taken the Black Hawks to the finals.

=== Final standings ===
American Division
	GP	W	L	T	GF	GA	PTS
**Boston Bruins**	44	28	10	6	143	90	62
**Chicago Black Hawks**	44	24	17	3	108	78	51
**New York Rangers**	44	19	16	9	106	87	47
Detroit Falcons	44	16	21	7	102	105	39
Philadelphia Quakers	44	4	36	4	76	184	12

Canadian Division
	GP	W	L	T	GF	GA	PTS
**Montreal Canadiens**	44	26	10	8	129	89	60
**Toronto Maple Leafs**	44	22	13	9	118	99	53
**Montreal Maroons**	44	20	18	6	105	106	46
New York Americans	44	18	16	10	76	74	46
Ottawa Senators	44	10	30	4	91	142	24

GP = Games Played, W = Wins, L = Losses, T = Ties, Pts = Points, GF = Goals For, GA = Goals Against
Teams that qualified for the playoffs are highlighted in bold.

== Playoffs ==
On March 26, during the second game of the best-of-five series between the Bruins and Canadiens, coach-GM Art Ross of Boston pulled his goalie for an extra attacker while down 1–0 with 40 seconds left in the final period. The attempt was unsuccessful. This marked the first time in Stanley Cup play that a goalie was pulled for an extra attacker.

=== Playoff bracket ===
Two modifications were made to the playoff format. The top three teams in each division still qualified for the playoffs. The two division winners met in a best-of-five Stanley Cup semifinal series. The divisional second-place teams and third-place teams played off in a two-game total-goals series to determine the participants for the other semifinal, which was changed from a best-of-three to another two-game total-goals series. The semifinal winners then played in the Stanley Cup Finals, which was expanded from a best-of-three to a best-of-five.

First round
C2	Toronto	3G
**A2**	**Chicago**	**4G**
C3	Mtl Maroons	1G
**A3**	**NY Rangers**	**8G**

Semifinals
**C1**	**Mtl Canadiens**	**3**
A1	Boston	2
**A2**	**Chicago**	**3G**
A3	NY Rangers	0G

Final
**C1**	**Mtl Canadiens**	**3**
A2	Chicago	2

=== Quarterfinals ===
==== (C2) Toronto Maple Leafs vs. (A2) Chicago Black Hawks ====
March 24	Chicago Black Hawks	2–2	Toronto Maple Leafs	Arena Gardens	Recap
Mush March (1) – 16:59		**First period**	11:53 – Ace Bailey (1)
Mush March (2) – 11:22		**Second period**	12:11 – Andy Blair (1)
No scoring		**Third period**	No scoring
Charlie Gardiner		**Goalie stats**	Lorne Chabot

March 26	Toronto Maple Leafs	1–2	**OT**	**Chicago Black Hawks**	Chicago Stadium	Recap
No scoring		First period		17:15 – Vic Ripley (1)
No scoring		Second period		No scoring
King Clancy (1) – 17:00		Third period		No scoring
No scoring		First overtime period		19:20 – Stew Adams (1)
Lorne Chabot		Goalie stats		Charlie Gardiner

**Chicago won series on total goals 4–3**

==== (A3) New York Rangers vs. (C3) Montreal Maroons ====
March 24	Montreal Maroons	**1–5**	**New York Rangers**	Madison Square Garden III	Recap
No scoring		**First period**	10:34 – Bill Cook (1)
No scoring		**Second period**	16:51 – Bill Cook (2)
Nels Stewart (1) – 19:26		**Third period**	05:15 – Paul Thompson (1); 13:11 – Butch Keeling (1); 14:23 – Paul Thompson
Dave Kerr		**Goalie stats**	John Ross Roach

March 26	**New York Rangers**	**3–0**	Montreal Maroons	Montreal Forum	Recap
No scoring		**First period**	No scoring
Bill Cook (3) – 07:15; Ching Johnson (1) – 10:20; Paul Thompson (3) – 15:29		**Second period**	No scoring
No scoring		**Third period**	No scoring
John Ross Roach		**Goalie stats**	Dave Kerr

**New York won series on total goals 8–1**

=== Semifinals ===
==== (A1) Boston Bruins vs. (C1) Montreal Canadiens ====
March 24	Montreal Canadiens	4–5	**OT**	**Boston Bruins**	Boston Madison Square Garden	Recap
No scoring		First period		No scoring
Johnny Gagnon (1) – 05:23; Nick Wasnie (1) – 06:26; Marty Burke (1) – 19:08		Second period		17:34 – Dit Clapper (1)
Sylvio Mantha (1) – 02:45		Third period		03:49 – Eddie Shore (1); 06:29 – Cooney Weiland (1); 10:26 – George Owen (1)
No scoring		First overtime period		18:56 – Cooney Weiland (2)
George Hainsworth		Goalie stats		Tiny Thompson

March 26	**Montreal Canadiens**	**1–0**	Boston Bruins	Boston Madison Square Garden	Recap
Georges Mantha (1) – 13:30		**First period**	No scoring
No scoring		**Second period**	No scoring
No scoring		**Third period**	No scoring
George Hainsworth		**Goalie stats**	Tiny Thompson

March 28	Boston Bruins	3–4	**OT**	**Montreal Canadiens**	Montreal Forum	Recap
Dit Clapper (2) – 17:20		First period		02:30 – Sylvio Mantha (2)
No scoring		Second period		02:25 – Gus Rivers (1); 15:12 – Georges Mantha (2)
Cooney Weiland (3) – 00:55; Marty Barry (1) – 14:15		Third period		No scoring
No scoring		First overtime period		05:10 – Georges Mantha (3)
Tiny Thompson		Goalie stats		George Hainsworth

March 30	**Boston Bruins**	**3–1**	Montreal Canadiens	Montreal Forum	Recap
Cooney Weiland (4) – 16:02		**First period**	No scoring
Eddie Shore (2) – 08:32; George Owen (2) – 14:46		**Second period**	No scoring
No scoring		**Third period**	09:39 – Nick Wasnie (2)
Tiny Thompson		**Goalie stats**	George Hainsworth

April 1	Boston Bruins	2–3	**OT**	**Montreal Canadiens**	Montreal Forum	Recap
No scoring		First period		06:28 – Johnny Gagnon (2); 09:18 – Pit Lepine (1)
No scoring		Second period		No scoring
Cooney Weiland (5) – 04:34; Cooney Weiland (6) – 13:42		Third period		No scoring
No scoring		First overtime period		19:00 – Wildor Larochelle (1)
Tiny Thompson		Goalie stats		George Hainsworth

**Montreal won series 3–2**

==== (A2) Chicago Black Hawks vs. (A3) New York Rangers ====
March 29	New York Rangers	**0–2**	**Chicago Black Hawks**	Chicago Stadium	Recap
No scoring		**First period**	12:25 – Johnny Gottselig (1)
No scoring		**Second period**	No scoring
No scoring		**Third period**	04:36 – Doc Romnes (1)
John Ross Roach		**Goalie stats**	Charlie Gardiner

March 31	**Chicago Black Hawks**	**1–0**	New York Rangers	Madison Square Garden III	Recap
No scoring		**First period**	No scoring
No scoring		**Second period**	No scoring
Tom Cook (1) – 05:30		**Third period**	No scoring
Charlie Gardiner		**Goalie stats**	John Ross Roach

**Chicago won series on total goals 3–0**

=== Stanley Cup Finals ===
In the final series, the Chicago Black Hawks took an early two games to one lead in the newly expanded best-of-five Stanley Cup Finals but the Montreal Canadiens came back and won the series three games to two for their second consecutive Stanley Cup win.

April 3	**Montreal Canadiens**	**2–1**	Chicago Black Hawks	Chicago Stadium	Recap
Georges Mantha (3) – 04:50		**First period**	No scoring
No scoring		**Second period**	No scoring
Pit Lepine (2) – 02:20		**Third period**	08:20 – Vic Ripley (2)
George Hainsworth		**Goalie stats**	Charlie Gardiner

April 5	Montreal Canadiens	1–2	**2OT**	**Chicago Black Hawks**	Chicago Stadium	Recap
No scoring		First period		No scoring
No scoring		Second period		11:45 – Stew Adams (2)
Nick Wasnie (3) – 12:10		Third period		No scoring
No scoring		Second overtime period		04:50 – Johnny Gottselig (2)
George Hainsworth		Goalie stats		Charlie Gardiner

April 9	**Chicago Black Hawks**	3–2	**3OT**	Montreal Canadiens	Montreal Forum	Recap
No scoring		First period		05:15 – Johnny Gagnon (3)
No scoring		Second period		07:29 – Georges Mantha (5)
Mush March (3) – 16:20; Stew Adams (3) – 17:07		Third period		No scoring
Cy Wentworth (1) – 13:50		Third overtime period		No scoring
Charlie Gardiner		Goalie stats		George Hainsworth

April 11	Chicago Black Hawks	**2–4**	**Montreal Canadiens**	Montreal Forum	Recap
Johnny Gottselig (3) – 01:33; Ty Arbour (1) – 13:58		**First period**	No scoring
No scoring		**Second period**	04:34 – Johnny Gagnon (4)
No scoring		**Third period**	04:25 – Johnny Gagnon (5); 10:55 – Pit Lepine (3); 17:25 – Pit Lepine (4)
Charlie Gardiner		**Goalie stats**	George Hainsworth

April 14	**Montreal Canadiens**	**2–0**	Chicago Black Hawks	Chicago Stadium	Recap
No scoring		**First period**	No scoring
09:59 – Johnny Gagnon (6)		**Second period**	No scoring
15:27 – Howie Morenz (1)		**Third period**	No scoring
George Hainsworth		**Goalie stats**	Charlie Gardiner

**Montreal won series 3–2**

== Awards ==
Howie Morenz won the Hart Trophy for the second time in his career. Frank Boucher won the Lady Byng for the fourth consecutive year. Roy Worters won the Vezina Trophy for the one and only time in his career.

1930–31 NHL awards
O'Brien Cup: (Canadian Division champion)	Montreal Canadiens
Prince of Wales Trophy: (American Division champion)	Boston Bruins
Hart Trophy: (Most valuable player)	Howie Morenz, Montreal Canadiens
Lady Byng Trophy: (Excellence and sportsmanship)	Frank Boucher, New York Rangers
Vezina Trophy: (Fewest goals allowed)	Roy Worters, New York Americans

=== All-Star teams ===
This was the first season that the NHL named its 'all-stars'. Although Roy Worters won the Vezina Trophy for "most valuable goaltender", Charlie Gardiner and Tiny Thompson were named to the all-star teams at the goaltender position.

First Team	Position	Second Team
Charlie Gardiner, Chicago Black Hawks	G	Tiny Thompson, Boston Bruins
Eddie Shore, Boston Bruins	D	Sylvio Mantha, Montreal Canadiens
King Clancy, Toronto Maple Leafs	D	Ching Johnson, New York Rangers
Howie Morenz, Montreal Canadiens	C	Frank Boucher, New York Rangers
Bill Cook, New York Rangers	RW	Dit Clapper, Boston Bruins
Aurel Joliat, Montreal Canadiens	LW	Bun Cook, New York Rangers
Lester Patrick, New York Rangers	Coach	Dick Irvin, Chicago Black Hawks

Source: NHL.

== Player statistics ==
=== Scoring leaders ===
GP = Games Played, G = Goals, A = Assists, Pts = Points, PIM = Penalties In Minutes

Player	Team	GP	G	A	Pts	PIM
Howie Morenz	Montreal Canadiens	39	28	23	51	49
Ebbie Goodfellow	Detroit Falcons	44	25	23	48	32
Charlie Conacher	Toronto Maple Leafs	37	31	12	43	78
Bill Cook	New York Rangers	43	30	12	42	39
Ace Bailey	Toronto Maple Leafs	40	23	19	42	46
Joe Primeau	Toronto Maple Leafs	38	9	32	41	18
Nels Stewart	Montreal Maroons	42	25	14	39	75
Frank Boucher	New York Rangers	44	12	27	39	20
Cooney Weiland	Boston Bruins	44	25	13	38	14
Bun Cook	New York Rangers	44	18	17	35	72
Aurel Joliat	Montreal Canadiens	43	13	22	35	73

Source: NHL.

=== Leading goaltenders ===
Note: GP = Games played; Mins = Minutes played; GA = Goals against; SO = Shutouts; GAA = Goals against average

Player	Team	GP	W	L	T	Mins	GA	SO	GAA
Roy Worters	New York Americans	44	18	16	10	2760	74	8	1.61
Charlie Gardiner	Chicago Black Hawks	44	24	17	3	2710	78	12	1.73
John Ross Roach	New York Rangers	44	19	16	9	2760	87	7	1.89
George Hainsworth	Montreal Canadiens	44	26	10	8	2740	89	8	1.95
Tiny Thompson	Boston Bruins	44	28	10	6	2730	90	3	1.98
Lorne Chabot	Toronto Maple Leafs	37	21	8	8	2300	80	6	2.09

Source: NHL.

== Coaches ==
=== American Division ===
- Boston Bruins: Art Ross
- Chicago Black Hawks: Emil Iverson
- Detroit Falcons: Jack Adams
- New York Rangers: Lester Patrick
- Philadelphia Quakers:Cooper Smeaton

=== Canadian Division ===
- Montreal Canadiens: Cecil Hart
- Montreal Maroons: Dunc Munro and George Boucher
- New York Americans: Eddie Gerard
- Ottawa Senators: Newsy Lalonde and Dave Gill
- Toronto Maple Leafs: Art Duncan

== Debuts ==
The following is a list of players of note who played their first NHL game in 1930–31 (listed with their first team, asterisk(*) marks debut in playoffs):

- Art Chapman, Boston Bruins
- Doc Romnes, Chicago Black Hawks
- John Sorrell, Detroit Falcons
- Johnny Gagnon, Montreal Canadiens
- Paul Haynes, Montreal Maroons
- Dave Kerr, Montreal Maroons
- Alex Levinsky, Toronto Maple Leafs
- Bob Gracie, Toronto Maple Leafs

== Last games ==
The following is a list of players of note that played their last game in the NHL in 1930–31 (listed with their last team):

- Frank Fredrickson, Detroit Falcons
- Bert McCaffrey, Montreal Canadiens
- Joe Simpson, New York Americans
- Babe Dye, Toronto Maple Leafs

== See also ==
- 1930–31 NHL transactions
- List of Stanley Cup champions
- 1930 in sports
- 1931 in sports
