= Sam McAdam =

Canadian ice hockey player

- Born: May 31, 1908 Stirling, Scotland, United Kingdom
- Died: December 29, 1976 (aged 68) Vancouver, British Columbia, Canada
- Height: 5 ft 7 in (170 cm)
- Weight: 168 lb (76 kg; 12 st 0 lb)
- Position: Centre/Left wing
- Shot: Left
- Played for: New York Rangers
- Playing career: 1926–1944

Samuel McAdam (May 31, 1908 – December 29, 1976) was a Canadian ice hockey forward. He played five games in the National Hockey League for the New York Rangers during the 1930–31 season. The rest of his career, which lasted from 1926 to 1944, was spent in the minor leagues, especially the Pacific Coast Hockey League. He was born in Stirling, Scotland, United Kingdom and raised in Winnipeg, Manitoba. He died of a heart attack in 1976. At the time of his death he worked as a waiter in a hotel.

== Career statistics ==
=== Regular season and playoffs ===
			Regular season					Playoffs
Season	Team	League	GP	G	A	Pts	PIM	GP	G	A	Pts	PIM
1924–25	Winnipeg Tigers	WJrHL	—	—	—	—	—	—	—	—	—	—
1924–25	Winnipeg Tigers	M-Cup	—	—	—	—	—	4	3	2	5	4
1925–26	Winnipeg Tammany Tigers	MAHA	1	1	0	1	4	—	—	—	—	—
1926–27	Winnipegs	WSrHL	5	0	1	1	4	1	0	0	0	0
1927–28	Elmwood Millionaires	WJrHL	5	5	3	8	—	2	1	1	2	6
1927–28	Winnipeg CPR	WSrHL	6	6	4	10	12	—	—	—	—	—
1927–28	Elmwood Maple Leafs	M-Cup	—	—	—	—	—	3	10	0	10	0
1928–29	Vancouver Lions	PCHL	36	10	5	15	24	3	1	0	1	4
1928–29	Winnipeg CPR	MHL	—	—	—	—	—	—	—	—	—	—
1929–30	Vancouver Lions	PCHL	35	11	7	18	38	4	1	1	2	0
1930–31	New York Rangers	NHL	5	0	0	0	0	—	—	—	—	—
1930–31	Vancouver Lions	PCHL	12	0	0	0	30	1	0	0	0	0
1930–31	Detroit Olympics	IHL	19	7	8	15	14	—	—	—	—	—
1931–32	Springfield Indians	Can-Am	39	10	6	16	33	—	—	—	—	—
1932–33	Regina Capitals	WCHL	29	15	13	28	113	2	4	1	5	0
1933–34	Vancouver Lions	NWHL	32	14	13	27	22	7	6	2	8	2
1934–35	Seattle Seahawks	NWHL	36	11	17	28	32	5	2	1	3	4
1935–36	Seattle Seahawks	NWHL	40	24	14	38	14	4	3	4	7	0
1936–37	Seattle Seahawks	PCHL	40	19	15	34	12	1	1	0	1	0
1937–38	Seattle Seahawks	PCHL	42	14	11	25	17	4	0	2	2	0
1938–39	Spokane Clippers	PCHL	48	18	21	39	6	—	—	—	—	—
1939–40	Portland Buckaroos	PCHL	36	2	8	10	12	5	0	1	1	2
1940–41	Spokane Bombers	PCHL	47	9	14	23	21	4	0	1	1	6
1941–42	New Westminster Spitfires	PCHL	10	1	5	6	0	—	—	—	—	—
1942–43	Vancouver St. Regis	PCHL	2	0	1	1	0	—	—	—	—	—
1943–44	Vancouver St. Regis	PCHL	1	0	1	1	0	—	—	—	—	—
PCHL totals			309	84	88	172	160	22	3	5	8	12
NHL totals			5	0	0	0	0	—	—	—	—	—

== Awards and achievements ==
- NWHL Second All-Star Team (1935)

== See also ==
- List of National Hockey League players from the United Kingdom
