= Art Gagné =

Canadian ice hockey player

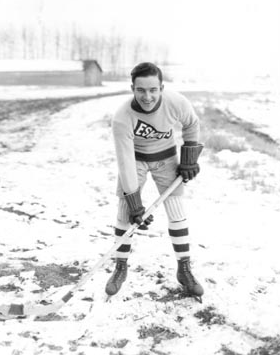
- Gagné with the Edmonton Eskimos in the 1921–22 season.
- Born: October 12, 1896 Ottawa, ON, Canada
- Died: October 5, 1988 (aged 91) Kamloops, BC, Canada
- Height: 5 ft 7 in (170 cm)
- Weight: 160 lb (73 kg; 11 st 6 lb)
- Position: Right wing
- Shot: Right
- Played for: Edmonton Eskimos; Regina Capitals; Ottawa Senators; Montreal Canadiens; Boston Bruins; Detroit Falcons
- Playing career: 1914–1936

Arthur Edward Joseph Gagné (October 12, 1896 – October 5, 1988) was a Canadian ice hockey right winger, born in Ottawa, Ontario.

== Career ==
Art Gagné started his career in the Ottawa City Hockey League in his native hometown, where he played for various teams between 1914 and 1917. He then played three seasons in Quebec City for Laval University, Quebec Sons of Ireland and Quebec Montagnais.

Gagné joined the Edmonton Eskimos of the Albertan Big-4 League in 1920–21, where he had a productive partnership with centre forward Gordon "Duke" Keats, also when the team moved along to the Western Canada Hockey League. In 1926, he moved to the Montreal Canadiens of the National Hockey League. He also played with the Regina Capitals, Boston Bruins, Ottawa Senators, and Detroit Falcons. Gagné scored 100 points in his 228-game NHL career.

== Career statistics ==
=== Regular season and playoffs ===
			Regular season					Playoffs
Season	Team	League	GP	G	A	Pts	PIM	GP	G	A	Pts	PIM
1914–15	Ottawa Aberdeens	OCHL	3	1	0	1	—	1	0	0	0	—
1914–15	Ottawa Royal Canadians	OCHL	5	2	0	2	—	2	0	0	0	—
1915–16	Ottawa Aberdeens	OCHL	5	4	0	4	—	—	—	—	—	—
1916–17	Laval University	QCHL	7	11	5	16	—	—	—	—	—	—
1916–17	Ottawa Grand Trunk	OCHL	2	1	0	1	—	—	—	—	—	—
1917–18	Quebec Sons of Ireland	QCHL	4	9	1	10	—	1	1	0	1	0
1918–19	Quebec Montagnais	QCHL	5	7	0	7	—	3	5	0	5	9
1920–21	Edmonton Eskimos	Big-4	15	9	4	13	22	—	—	—	—	—
1921–22	Edmonton Eskimos	WCHL	20	15	7	22	24	2	0	0	0	0
1922–23	Edmonton Eskimos	WCHL	29	22	21	43	63	2	1	0	1	0
1922–23	Edmonton Eskimos	St-Cup	—	—	—	—	—	2	0	0	0	2
1923–24	Regina Capitals	WCHL	25	7	7	14	39	2	0	0	0	0
1924–25	Regina Capitals	WCHL	28	8	7	15	32	—	—	—	—	—
1925–26	Edmonton Eskimos	WHL	30	21	12	33	20	2	1	2	3	6
1926–27	Montreal Canadiens	NHL	44	14	3	17	42	4	0	0	0
1927–28	Montreal Canadiens	NHL	44	20	10	30	75	2	1	1	2	4
1928–29	Montreal Canadiens	NHL	44	7	3	10	52	3	0	0	0	12
1929–30	Boston Bruins	NHL	6	0	1	1	6	—	—	—	—	—
1929–30	Ottawa Senators	NHL	33	6	4	10	32	2	1	0	1	4
1930–31	Ottawa Senators	NHL	44	19	11	30	50	—	—	—	—	—
1931–32	Detroit Falcons	NHL	13	1	1	2	0	—	—	—	—	—
1931–32	Detroit Olympics	IHL	29	6	7	13	18	6	0	1	1	2
1932–33	Edmonton Eskimos	WCHL	29	25	7	32	25	8	6	1	7	7
1933–34	Edmonton Eskimos	NWHL	33	18	21	39	29	2	1	1	2	0
1934–35	Edmonton Eskimos	NWHL	28	20	12	32	18	—	—	—	—	—
1935–36	Seattle Seahawks	NWHL	10	1	4	5	6	—	—	—	—	—
1935–36	Edmonton Eskimos	NWHL	17	10	5	15	9	—	—	—	—	—
WCHL/WHL totals			132	73	54	127	180	8	2	2	4	6
NHL totals			228	67	33	100	257	11	2	1	3	20
