= Ron Lyon =

Canadian ice hockey player

- Born: February 15, 1908; Portage la Prairie, Manitoba, Canada
- Died: February 5, 1942 (aged 33); Detroit, Michigan, United States
- Height: 5 ft 11 in (180 cm)
- Weight: 170 lb (77 kg; 12 st 2 lb)
- Position: Left wing
- Shot: Left
- Played for: Boston Bruins; Philadelphia Quakers
- Playing career: 1929–1937

Ronald Frederick Lyon (February 15, 1908 – February 5, 1942) was a Canadian professional ice hockey player who played 36 regular season and 5 playoff games for the Philadelphia Quakers and Boston Bruins of the National Hockey League in the 1930–31 season. The rest of his career, which lasted from 1929 to 1938, was spent in different minor leagues. He was born in Portage la Prairie, Manitoba.

== Career statistics ==
=== Regular season and playoffs ===
| | | | Regular season | | | | | Playoffs |
| Season | Team | League | GP | G | A | Pts | PIM | GP | G | A | Pts | PIM |
|---|---|---|---|---|---|---|---|---|---|---|---|---|
| 1926–27 | International Falls AC | NMHL | — | — | — | — | — | — | — | — | — | — |
| 1927–28 | Medicine Hat Tigers | ASHL | — | — | — | — | — | — | — | — | — | — |
| 1928–29 | Trail Smoke Eaters | WKHL | — | — | — | — | — | — | — | — | — | — |
| 1929–30 | Portland Buckaroos | PCHL | 35 | 4 | 1 | 5 | 4 | 4 | 1 | 0 | 1 | 4 |
| 1930–31 | Boston Bruins | NHL | 14 | 0 | 0 | 0 | 0 | 5 | 0 | 0 | 0 | 0 |
| 1930–31 | Boston Tigers | Can-Am | 7 | 2 | 3 | 5 | 33 | — | — | — | — | — |
| 1930–31 | Philadelphia Quakers | NHL | 22 | 2 | 4 | 6 | 8 | — | — | — | — | — |
| 1931–32 | Boston Cubs | Can-Am | 2 | 1 | 0 | 1 | 6 | — | — | — | — | — |
| 1931–32 | Springfield Indians | Can-Am | 31 | 7 | 7 | 14 | 24 | — | — | — | — | — |
| 1932–33 | Windsor Bulldogs | IHL | 5 | 1 | 2 | 3 | 4 | — | — | — | — | — |
| 1933–34 | Portland Buckaroos | NWHL | 34 | 14 | 12 | 26 | 44 | — | — | — | — | — |
| 1934–35 | Portland Buckaroos | NWHL | 32 | 13 | 10 | 23 | 45 | 3 | 1 | 0 | 1 | 2 |
| 1935–36 | Portland Buckaroos | NWHL | 9 | 0 | 1 | 1 | 4 | — | — | — | — | — |
| 1935–36 | Seattle Seahawks | NWHL | 22 | 3 | 3 | 6 | 0 | — | — | — | — | — |
| 1936–37 | Seattle Seahawks/Portland Buckaroos | PCHL | 7 | 1 | 2 | 3 | 8 | — | — | — | — | — |
| 1937–38 | Portland Buckaroos | PCHL | 6 | 0 | 0 | 0 | 0 | — | — | — | — | — |
| 1937–38 | Seattle Seahawks | PCHL | 1 | 0 | 0 | 0 | 0 | — | — | — | — | — |
| NHL totals | | | 36 | 2 | 4 | 6 | 27 | 5 | 0 | 0 | 0 | 0 |
