= Frank Sheppard (ice hockey) =

Canadian ice hockey player

- Sheppard c. 1927 with the Detroit Cougars
- Born: October 5, 1905; Montreal, Quebec, Canada
- Died: February 20, 1996 (aged 90); Vancouver, British Columbia, Canada
- Height: 5 ft 6 in (168 cm)
- Weight: 157 lb (71 kg; 11 st 3 lb)
- Position: Centre/Left wing
- Shot: Left
- Played for: Detroit Cougars
- Playing career: 1925–1937

Joseph Francis Xavier Sheppard (October 5, 1905 — February 20, 1996) was a Canadian ice hockey player who played eight games in the National Hockey League with the Detroit Cougars during the 1927–28 season. Born in Montreal, Quebec, but grew up in Selkirk, Manitoba. He was the younger brother of Johnny Sheppard. The obituary in the Vancouver Sun issue date February 22, 1996 states he was born on October 5, 1905, not October 19, 1905.

== Playing career ==
Sheppard mainly played in the American Hockey Association (AHA), spending six seasons there between 1926 and 1932. He signed with the Detroit Cougars on September 9, 1927. His NHL debut came on November 15 against the Pittsburgh Pirates, and he scored his first goal in that game. Sheppard played eight games with Detroit before being traded to the St. Paul Saints of the AHA on December 19, 1927. After his time in the AHA Sheppard would play five seasons split between the Western Canada Hockey League, North West Hockey League, and Pacific Coast Hockey League, retiring in 1937.

== Post-playing career ==
After his hockey career, Sheppard worked as a real estate agent, however soon after the death of his wife in 1953, he quit his job and became homeless and addicted to alcohol, "bounc[ing] in and out of beer parlours and construction camps". In 1966, he was arrested and given a suspended sentence for begging on the streets of Vancouver.

One Sheppard's sons, James Frank (Jim) Sheppard (born 1939) was the former chief executive officer of machinery company Finning, and forestry product company Canfor. He was also an economic advisor to British Columbia Premiers Gordon Campbell and Christy Clark.

== Career statistics ==
=== Regular season and playoffs ===
			Regular season					Playoffs
Season	Team	League	GP	G	A	Pts	PIM	GP	G	A	Pts	PIM
1925–26	Winnipeg Maroons	CHL	29	3	3	6	16	—	—	—	—	—
1926–27	Detroit Millionaires	MOHL	—	—	—	—	—	—	—	—	—	—
1926–27	Detroit Greyhounds	AHA	2	0	0	0	0	—	—	—	—	—
1927–28	Detroit Cougars	NHL	8	1	1	2	0	—	—	—	—	—
1927–28	St. Paul Saints	AHA	33	12	4	16	32	—	—	—	—	—
1928–29	St. Paul Saints	AHA	2	0	0	0	0	—	—	—	—	—
1928–29	Tulsa Oilers	AHA	40	21	10	31	31	4	2	0	2	2
1929–30	Tulsa Oilers	AHA	43	11	6	17	41	7	1	1	2	2
1930–31	Tulsa Oilers	AHA	48	21	11	32	54	4	1	1	2	8
1931–32	Tulsa Oilers	AHA	41	8	4	12	50	—	—	—	—	—
1932–33	Regina Capitals/Vancouver Maroons	WCHL	27	19	13	32	23	2	1	0	1	2
1933–34	Edmonton Eskimos	NWHL	7	1	2	3	2	—	—	—	—	—
1934–35	Calgary Tigers/Edmonton Eskimos	NWHL	14	1	4	5	14	—	—	—	—	—
1935–36	Vancouver Lions	NWHL	39	10	7	17	50	7	3	3	6	5
1936–37	Vancouver Lions	PCHL	7	2	1	3	4	—	—	—	—	—
AHA totals			209	73	35	108	208	15	4	2	6	12
NHL totals			8	1	1	2	0	—	—	—	—	—
