= Jack Arbour =

Canadian ice hockey player

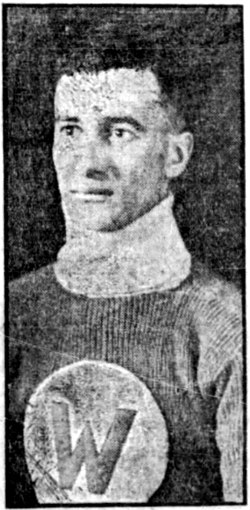
- Arbour with the Calgary Wanderers in 1919–20
- Born: March 7, 1899; Waubaushene, Ontario, Canada
- Died: September 24, 1973 (aged 74); Calgary, Alberta, Canada
- Height: 5 ft 8 in (173 cm)
- Weight: 172 lb (78 kg; 12 st 4 lb)
- Position: Defence
- Shot: Left
- Played for: Calgary Tigers; Seattle Metropolitans; Detroit Cougars; Toronto Maple Leafs; London Panthers; Windsor Bulldogs; Portland Buckaroos; Spokane Clippers
- Playing career: 1922–1938

John Albert Arbour (March 7, 1899 – September 24, 1973) was a Canadian ice hockey defenceman who played for several teams in a variety of leagues between 1922 and 1938. The younger brother of Ty Arbour, he did not repeat his older brother's success in the National Hockey League, and managed only 47 games over 2 seasons with the Detroit Cougars and Toronto Maple Leafs. He finished his NHL career in 1938 with 5 goals and one assist.

== Career statistics ==
=== Regular season and playoffs ===
			Regular season					Playoffs
Season	Team	League	GP	G	A	Pts	PIM	GP	G	A	Pts	PIM
1919–20	Calgary Wanderers	Big-4	12	3	0	3	17	1	0	0	0	0
1920–21	Calgary Tigers	Big-4	15	2	3	5	15	—	—	—	—	—
1921–22	Calgary Tigers	WCHL	14	2	2	4	8	—	—	—	—	—
1922–23	Calgary Tigers	WCHL	5	0	1	1	2	—	—	—	—	—
1923–24	Seattle Metropolitans	PCHA	28	2	3	5	16	2	1	0	1	0
1924–25	Calgary Tigers	WCHL	3	0	0	0	0	—	—	—	—	—
1926–27	Detroit Cougars	NHL	37	4	1	5	46	—	—	—	—	—
1927–28	Detroit Olympics	Can-Pro	42	12	6	18	77	2	0	0	0	2
1928–29	Toronto Maple Leafs	NHL	10	1	0	1	10	—	—	—	—	—
1928–29	London Panthers	Can-Pro	9	0	0	0	8	—	—	—	—	—
1928–29	Windsor Hornets	Can-Pro	30	7	3	10	33	8	0	0	0	18
1929–30	Windsor Bulldogs	IHL	41	8	5	13	57	—	—	—	—	—
1930–31	Windsor Bulldogs	IHL	46	7	16	23	34	6	3	1	4	13
1931–32	Windsor Bulldogs	IHL	45	9	9	18	74	6	0	0	0	2
1932–33	Windsor Bulldogs	IHL	43	5	9	14	39	6	0	0	0	4
1933–34	Seattle Seahawks	NWHL	34	5	4	9	24	—	—	—	—	—
1934–35	Portland Buckaroos	NWHL	32	11	9	20	12	3	0	0	0	2
1935–36	Portland Buckaroos	PCHL	39	6	4	10	41	3	0	1	1	6
1936–37	Spokane Clippers	PCHL	13	1	2	3	12	—	—	—	—	—
1937–38	Spokane Clippers	PCHL	9	0	1	1	2	—	—	—	—	—
1938–39	Spokane Clippers	PCHL	2	0	0	0	0	—	—	—	—	—
IHL totals			175	29	39	68	204	18	3	1	4	19
NHL totals			47	5	1	6	56	—	—	—	—	—
