= Walter McCartney =

Canadian ice hockey player

- Born: April 26, 1909; Weyburn, Saskatchewan, Canada
- Died: September 6, 1978 (aged 69); Portland, Oregon, U.S.
- Height: 5 ft 10 in (178 cm)
- Weight: 160 lb (73 kg; 11 st 6 lb)
- Position: Left wing
- Shot: Left
- Played for: Montreal Canadiens
- Playing career: 1927–1941

Walter Herbert McCartney (April 26, 1909 – September 6, 1978) was a Canadian professional ice hockey forward. He played 2 games in the National Hockey League for the Montreal Canadiens during the 1932–33 season. The rest of his career, which lasted from 1927 to 1944, was spent in the minor leagues. McCartney was born in Weyburn, Saskatchewan. He died in Portland, Oregon and is buried in the Skyline Memorial Gardens.

== Career statistics ==
=== Regular season and playoffs ===
			Regular season					Playoffs
Season	Team	League	GP	G	A	Pts	PIM	GP	G	A	Pts	PIM
1926–27	Indian Head Bengals	S-SJHL	6	2	0	2	0	—	—	—	—	—
1927–28	Weyburn Beavers	S-SSHL	6	2	0	2	0	—	—	—	—	—
1928–29	Weyburn Beavers	S-SSHL	20	15	4	19	0	2	0	0	0	2
1929–30	Weyburn Beavers	S-SSHL	20	5	5	10	8	4	0	0	0	0
1929–30	Weyburn Beavers	Al-Cup	—	—	—	—	—	2	1	0	1	0
1930–31	Weyburn Beavers	S-SSHL	20	11	0	11	10	—	—	—	—	—
1931–32	Weyburn Beavers	S-SSHL	17	10	1	11	8	3	1	1	2	4
1931–32	Weyburn Beavers	Al-Cup	—	—	—	—	—	6	6	1	7	16
1932–33	Montreal Canadiens	NHL	2	0	0	0	0	—	—	—	—	—
1932–33	Quebec Castors	Can-Am	12	0	0	0	4	—	—	—	—	—
1933–34	Vancouver Lions	NWHL	27	4	3	7	10	7	2	0	2	4
1934–35	Calgary Tigers	NWHL	14	12	2	14	2	—	—	—	—	—
1935–36	Calgary Tigers	NWHL	24	9	4	13	6	—	—	—	—	—
1935–36	Portland Buckaroos	NWHL	13	4	3	7	6	—	—	—	—	—
1936–37	Vancouver Lions	PCHL	—	—	—	—	—	—	—	—	—	—
1936–37	Portland Buckaroos	PCHL	32	6	10	16	16	6	3	1	4	5
1937–38	Spokane Clippers	PCHL	42	6	7	13	19	—	—	—	—	—
1938–39	Portland Buckaroos	PCHL	45	21	19	40	49	5	2	1	3	6
1939–40	Portland Buckaroos	PCHL	37	14	9	23	26	5	2	0	2	6
1940–41	Portland Buckaroos	PCHL	6	0	3	3	0	—	—	—	—	—
1940–41	Seattle Olympics	PCHL	41	12	10	22	17	2	0	1	1	0
1942–43	Kingston Frontenacs	OHA Sr	2	0	0	0	0	—	—	—	—	—
1943–44	Vancouver St. Regis	NWHL	3	0	0	0	0	—	—	—	—	—
1943–44	Portland Oilers	PCHL	15	15	10	25	2	6	11	1	12	6
NHL totals			2	0	0	0	0	—	—	—	—	—
