= Art Townsend (ice hockey) =

Canadian ice hockey player

- Born: October 9, 1905; Souris, Manitoba, Canada
- Died: August 5, 1971 (aged 65)
- Height: 5 ft 10 in (178 cm)
- Weight: 185 lb (84 kg; 13 st 3 lb)
- Position: Defence
- Shot: Left
- Played for: Chicago Black Hawks; Portland Rosebuds
- Playing career: 1923–1939

Arthur Elmer Albert Townsend (October 9, 1905 – August 5, 1971) was a Canadian professional ice hockey player who played five games in the National Hockey League for the Chicago Black Hawks during the 1926–27 season and 29 games in the Western Hockey League with the Portland Rosebuds during the 1925–26 season. The rest of his career, which lasted from 1923 to 1939, was spent in various minor leagues. He was born in Souris, Manitoba.

== Career statistics ==
=== Regular season and playoffs ===
| | | | Regular season | | | | | Playoffs |
| Season | Team | League | GP | G | A | Pts | PIM | GP | G | A | Pts | PIM |
|---|---|---|---|---|---|---|---|---|---|---|---|---|
| 1923–24 | Souris Eagles | MHL | — | — | — | — | — | — | — | — | — | — |
| 1924–25 | Brandon Wheat Kings | MHL | 20 | 7 | 2 | 9 | — | — | — | — | — | — |
| 1925–26 | Portland Rosebuds | WHL | 29 | 4 | 2 | 6 | 48 | — | — | — | — | — |
| 1926–27 | Chicago Black Hawks | NHL | 5 | 0 | 0 | 0 | 0 | — | — | — | — | — |
| 1926–27 | Springfield Indians | Can-Am | 24 | 7 | 1 | 8 | 40 | 6 | 0 | 0 | 0 | 6 |
| 1927–28 | Winnipeg Maroons | AHA | 38 | 5 | 4 | 9 | 93 | — | — | — | — | — |
| 1928–29 | Tulsa Oilers | AHA | 20 | 1 | 1 | 2 | 39 | — | — | — | — | — |
| 1929–30 | Seattle Eskimos | PCHL | 28 | 3 | 1 | 4 | 118 | — | — | — | — | — |
| 1930–31 | San Francisco Tigers | CalHL | — | 1 | 5 | 6 | — | — | — | — | — | — |
| 1931–32 | London Tecumsehs | IHL | 6 | 0 | 0 | 0 | 4 | — | — | — | — | — |
| 1931–32 | Trois-Rivieres Renards | ECHA | 23 | 5 | 3 | 8 | 38 | — | — | — | — | — |
| 1932–33 | Edmonton Eskimos | WCHL | 25 | 4 | 4 | 8 | 37 | 8 | 1 | 2 | 3 | 8 |
| 1933–34 | Edmonton Eskimos | NWHL | 34 | 10 | 9 | 19 | 102 | 2 | 0 | 1 | 1 | 4 |
| 1934–35 | Edmonton Eskimos | NWHL | 29 | 4 | 8 | 12 | 53 | — | — | — | — | — |
| 1935–36 | Edmonton Eskimos | NWHL | 40 | 5 | 6 | 11 | 84 | — | — | — | — | — |
| 1936–37 | University of Alberta | ESrHL | — | — | — | — | — | — | — | — | — | — |
| 1937–38 | Edmonton Superiors | ASHL | 20 | 7 | 5 | 12 | 49 | — | — | — | — | — |
| 1938–39 | Edmonton Superiors | ASHL | 10 | 1 | 1 | 2 | 10 | — | — | — | — | — |
| WHL totals | | | 29 | 4 | 2 | 6 | 48 | — | — | — | — | — |
| NHL totals | | | 5 | 0 | 0 | 0 | 0 | — | — | — | — | — |
