= Henry Dyck =

Canadian ice hockey player

- Born: September 5, 1912; Saskatoon, Saskatchewan, Canada
- Died: November 15, 1993 (aged 81)
- Height: 5 ft 8 in (173 cm)
- Weight: 155 lb (70 kg; 11 st 1 lb)
- Position: Centre/Left wing
- Shot: Left
- Played for: New York Rangers
- Playing career: 1930–1944

Henry Richard Dyck (September 5, 1912 – November 15, 1993) was a Canadian ice hockey left winger. He played one game in the National Hockey League for the New York Rangers on December 25, 1943 against the Toronto Maple Leafs. The rest of his career, which lasted from 1930 to 1944, was spent in the minor leagues.

== Career statistics ==
=== Regular season and playoffs ===
			Regular season					Playoffs
Season	Team	League	GP	G	A	Pts	PIM	GP	G	A	Pts	PIM
1928–29	Calgary Jimmies	CCHJL	4	4	0	4	0	—	—	—	—	—
1929–30	Calgary Canadians	CCJHL	—	—	—	—	—	—	—	—	—	—
1929–30	Calgary Canadians	M-Cup	—	—	—	—	—	7	9	2	11	4
1930–31	Seattle Eskimos	PCHL	34	1	1	2	18	4	0	0	0	2
1931–32	Syracuse Stars	IHL	2	0	0	0	0	—	—	—	—	—
1931–32	Hollywood Stars	Cal-Pro	—	13	12	25	—	—	—	—	—	—
1932–33	Saskatoon Crescents	WCHL	—	23	12	35	18	—	—	—	—	—
1933–34	Seattle Seahawks	NWHL	34	11	9	20	24	—	—	—	—	—
1934–35	Vancouver Lions	NWHL	37	15	9	24	22	8	0	1	1	6
1935–36	Vancouver Lions	NWHL	25	10	4	14	6	—	—	—	—	—
1935–36	Edmonton Eskimos	NWHL	16	7	2	9	5	—	—	—	—	—
1936–37	Portland Buckaroos	PCHL	10	2	0	2	2	—	—	—	—	—
1936–37	Seattle Seahawks	PCHL	4	0	0	0	0	—	—	—	—	—
1937–38	Tulsa Oilers	AHA	43	10	20	30	22	4	1	2	3	5
1938–39	Tulsa Oilers	AHA	48	16	18	34	31	8	4	1	5	0
1939–40	Kansas City Greyhounds	AHA	39	14	16	30	19	—	—	—	—	—
1940–41	Kansas City Americans	AHA	5	0	1	1	0	—	—	—	—	—
1941–42	Johnstown Blue Birds	EAHL	58	46	40	86	32	7	11	5	16	2
1942–43	Washington Lions	AHL	27	4	9	13	6	—	—	—	—	—
1942–43	Buffalo Bisons	AHL	4	0	2	2	2	—	—	—	—	—
1943–44	New York Rangers	NHL	1	0	0	0	0	—	—	—	—	—
1943–44	Boston Olympics	EAHL	1	1	0	1	0	9	7	8	15	4
1943–44	Toronto Staffords	TMHL	24	23	18	41	14	11	15	12	27	6
1944–45	Toronto Staffords	OHA Sr	1	0	0	0	0	—	—	—	—	—
AHA totals			135	40	55	95	72	12	5	3	8	5
NWHL totals			112	43	24	67	57	8	0	1	1	6
NHL totals			1	0	0	0	0	—	—	—	—	—

== See also ==
- List of players who played only one game in the NHL
