= Tony Hemmerling =

Canadian ice hockey player

- Born: May 15, 1914; Landis, Saskatchewan, Canada
- Died: May 23, 1983 (aged 69); Spokane, Washington, U.S.
- Height: 5 ft 11 in (180 cm)
- Weight: 178 lb (81 kg; 12 st 10 lb)
- Position: Left wing
- Shot: Left
- Played for: New York Americans
- Playing career: 1929–1947

Anthony Elmer Charles Hemmerling (May 15, 1914 — May 23, 1983) was a Canadian professional ice hockey player who played 24 games in the National Hockey League with the New York Americans between 1936 and 1937. The rest of his career, which lasted from 1929 to 1947, was spent in various minor leagues. Hemmerling was born in Landis, Saskatchewan.

== Career statistics ==
=== Regular season and playoffs ===
			Regular season					Playoffs
Season	Team	League	GP	G	A	Pts	PIM	GP	G	A	Pts	PIM
1929–30	Biggar Nationals	S-SSHL	6	1	1	2	2	—	—	—	—	—
1929–30	Wilkie Outlaws	S-SJHL	—	—	—	—	—	2	1	0	1	6
1930–31	North Battleford Beavers	NSSHL	15	3	8	11	20	4	0	0	0	8
1930–31	North Battleford Beavers	Al-Cup	—	—	—	—	—	4	0	0	0	6
1931–32	North Battleford Beavers	NSSHL	20	11	5	16	24	—	—	—	—	—
1932–33	Saskatoon Quakers	SK-Sr	16	3	1	4	23	3	0	0	0	6
1932–33	Saskatoon Quakers	Al-Cup	—	—	—	—	—	13	1	0	1	21
1933–34	Seattle Seahawks	NWHL	34	13	4	17	46	—	—	—	—	—
1934–35	Seattle Seahawks	NWHL	36	21	12	33	46	5	1	2	3	0
1935–36	Seattle Seahawks	NWHL	6	1	1	2	4	—	—	—	—	—
1935–36	Calgary Tigers	NWHL	1	0	0	0	0	—	—	—	—	—
1935–36	New York Americans	NHL	3	0	0	0	0	—	—	—	—	—
1935–36	Rochester Cardinals	IHL	11	2	5	7	2	—	—	—	—	—
1935–36	New Haven Eagles	Can-Am	18	4	6	10	8	—	—	—	—	—
1936–37	New York Americans	NHL	19	3	3	6	4	—	—	—	—	—
1936–37	New Haven Eagles	IAHL	24	4	10	14	15	—	—	—	—	—
1937–38	New Haven Eagles	IAHL	42	11	11	22	14	2	1	1	2	2
1938–39	New Haven Eagles	IAHL	50	13	13	26	9	—	—	—	—	—
1939–40	New Haven Eagles	IAHL	51	26	31	57	4	3	2	2	4	0
1940–41	Buffalo Bisons	AHL	56	14	10	24	22	—	—	—	—	—
1941–42	Buffalo Bisons	AHL	55	20	19	39	7	—	—	—	—	—
1942–43	Pittsburgh Hornets	AHL	42	17	19	36	16	2	0	0	0	0
1943–44	Pittsburgh Hornets	AHL	51	19	24	43	23	—	—	—	—	—
1944–45	Pittsburgh Hornets	AHL	57	31	33	64	6	—	—	—	—	—
1945–46	Pittsburgh Hornets	AHL	1	0	0	0	0	—	—	—	—	—
1945–46	Buffalo Bisons	AHL	9	1	1	2	2	—	—	—	—	—
1945–46	Providence Reds	AHL	6	3	2	5	0	—	—	—	—	—
1945–46	Dallas Texans	USHL	7	1	1	2	2	—	—	—	—	—
1946–47	Fresno Falcons	PCHL	5	4	1	5	0	—	—	—	—	—
IAHL/AHL totals			444	159	173	332	84	7	3	3	6	2
NHL totals			22	3	3	6	4	—	—	—	—	—
