= List of NHL players (H) =

This is a list of National Hockey League (NHL) players who have played at least one game in the NHL from 1917 to present and have a last name that starts with "H".

List updated as of the 2018–19 NHL season.

== Haa–Ham ==
- Kari Haakana
- Ari Haanpaa
- Henrik Haapala
- David Haas
- Gaetan Haas
- Marc Habscheid
- Len Hachborn
- Jeff Hackett
- Matt Hackett
- Lloyd Haddon
- Vic Hadfield
- Brandon Hagel
- Carl Hagelin
- Robert Hagg
- James Haggarty
- Sean Haggerty
- Roger Hagglund
- Matti Hagman
- Niklas Hagman
- Nicolas Hague
- Riku Hahl
- Gordon Haidy
- Ron Hainsey
- George Hainsworth
- Richard Hajdu
- Libor Hajek
- Bill Hajt
- Chris Hajt
- Jani Hakanpaa
- Anders Hakansson
- Jaroslav Halak
- Jayden Halbgewachs
- Haldor Halderson
- David Hale
- Larry Hale
- Len Haley
- Micheal Haley
- Matt Halischuk
- Bob Halkidis
- Steven Halko
- Adam Hall
- Bob Hall
- Del Hall
- Glenn Hall
- Joe Hall
- Murray Hall
- Taylor Hall (born 1964)
- Taylor Hall (born 1991)
- Wayne Hall
- Filip Hallander
- Kevin Haller
- Milt Halliday
- Mats Hallin
- Mike Halmo
- Brian Halonen
- Jeff Halpern
- Brandon Halverson
- Trevor Halverson
- Doug Halward
- Hardy Haman Aktell
- James Hamblin
- Denis Hamel
- Gilles Hamel
- Herbert Hamel
- Jean Hamel
- Pierre Hamel
- Dan Hamhuis
- Red Hamill
- Zach Hamill
- Al Hamilton
- Chuck Hamilton
- Curtis Hamilton
- Dougie Hamilton
- Freddie Hamilton
- Jackie Hamilton
- Jeff Hamilton
- Jim Hamilton
- Reg Hamilton
- Ryan Hamilton
- Inge Hammarstrom
- Ken Hammond
- Andrew Hammond
- Travis Hamonic
- Gord Hampson
- Ted Hampson
- Rick Hampton
- Radek Hamr
- Roman Hamrlik
- Mark Hamway

== Han–Haz ==
- Fredrik Handemark
- Ron Handy
- Michal Handzus
- Alan Hangsleben
- Noah Hanifin
- Ben Hankinson
- Casey Hankinson
- Joel Hanley
- Glen Hanlon
- John Hanna
- Dave Hannan
- Scott Hannan
- Gord Hannigan
- Pat Hannigan
- Ray Hannigan
- Markus Hannikainen
- Ben Hanowski
- Jannik Hansen
- Richie Hansen
- Tavis Hansen
- Christian Hanson
- Dave Hanson
- Emil Hanson
- Keith Hanson
- Oscar Hanson
- Martin Hanzal
- Nick Harbaruk
- Jeff Harding
- Josh Harding
- Jocelyn Hardy
- Mark Hardy
- Jim Hargreaves
- Johan Harju
- Brett Harkins
- Jansen Harkins
- Todd Harkins
- Thomas Harley
- David Harlock
- Scott Harlow
- Glen Harmon
- Johnny Harms
- Walter Harnott
- Shane Harper
- Terry Harper
- Ben Harpur
- Tim Harrer
- Hago Harrington
- Scott Harrington
- Billy Harris (born 1935)
- Billy Harris (born 1952)
- Duke Harris
- Henry Harris
- Hugh Harris
- Jordan Harris
- Ron Harris
- Ted Harris
- Smokey Harris
- Ed Harrison
- Jay Harrison
- Jim Harrison
- Paul Harrison
- Peter Harrold
- Carter Hart
- Gerry Hart
- Harold "Gizzy" Hart
- Mark Hartigan
- Teemu Hartikainen
- Mike Hartman
- Ryan Hartman
- Scott Hartnell
- Craig Hartsburg
- Doug Harvey
- Buster Harvey
- Hugh Harvey
- Todd Harvey
- Rafael Harvey-Pinard
- Dominik Hasek
- Bob Hassard
- Santeri Hatakka
- Derian Hatcher
- Kevin Hatcher
- Garnet Hathaway
- Ed Hatoum
- Brett Hauer
- Erik Haula
- Adam Hauser
- Niclas Havelid
- Martin Havlat
- Dale Hawerchuk
- Greg Hawgood
- Todd Hawkins
- Alan Haworth
- Gordie Haworth
- Neil Hawryliw
- Jayce Hawryluk
- Bill Hay
- Dwayne Hay
- George Hay
- Jim Hay
- Darren Haydar
- John Hayden
- Peter Hayek
- Chris Hayes
- Eriah Hayes
- Jimmy Hayes
- Kevin Hayes
- Zack Hayes
- Paul Haynes
- Barrett Hayton
- Brian Hayward
- Rick Hayward
- Steve Hazlett

== He ==
- Don Head
- Galen Head
- Fern Headley
- Eric Healey
- Rich Healey
- Glenn Healy
- Shawn Heaphy
- Mark Heaslip
- Randy Heath
- Dillon Heatherington
- Dany Heatley
- Andy Hebenton
- Guy Hebert
- Sammy Hebert
- Jochen Hecht
- Radoslav Hecl
- Anders Hedberg
- Johan Hedberg
- Bret Hedican
- Pierre Hedin
- Victor Hedman
- Jonathan Hedstrom
- Tim Heed
- Jeff Heerema
- Cal Heeter
- Frank Heffernan
- Gerald Heffernan
- Mike Heidt
- Ilkka Heikkinen
- Bill Heindl Jr.
- Emil Heineman
- Danton Heinen
- Ville Heinola
- Lionel Heinrich
- Shawn Heins
- Rick Heinz
- Steve Heinze
- Earl Heiskala
- Miro Heiskanen
- Barrett Heisten
- Jan Hejda
- Milan Hejduk
- Peter Helander
- Timo Helbling
- Riku Helenius
- Sami Helenius
- Seth Helgeson
- Magnus Hellberg
- Connor Hellebuyck
- Ehrhardt Heller
- Drew Helleson
- Darren Helm
- Harry Helman
- Bryan Helmer
- Dwight Helminen
- Raimo Helminen
- Colin Hemingway
- Tony Hemmerling
- Ales Hemsky
- Archie Henderson
- Jay Henderson
- John Henderson
- Kevin Henderson
- Matt Henderson
- Murray Henderson
- Paul Henderson
- Matt Hendricks
- Darby Hendrickson
- Jack Hendrickson
- Jordan Hendry
- Samuel Henley
- Josh Hennessy
- Lorne Henning
- Adam Henrique
- Alex Henry
- Burke Henry
- Camille Henry
- Dale Henry
- Gordon Henry
- Jim Henry
- T. J. Hensick
- Jukka Hentunen
- Aleksi Heponiemi
- Alan Hepple
- Ian Herbers
- Jimmy Herbert
- Art Herchenratter
- Fred Hergerts
- Phil Hergesheimer
- Wally Hergesheimer
- Red Heron
- Yves Heroux
- Chris Herperger
- Matt Herr
- Denis Herron
- Jason Herter
- Tomas Hertl
- Matt Hervey
- Shaun Heshka
- Bob Hess
- Jamie Heward
- Obs Heximer
- Bryan Hextall
- Bryan Hextall Jr.
- Dennis Hextall
- Ron Hextall
- Vic Heyliger

== Hi–Hn ==
- Bill Hicke
- Ernie Hicke
- Joe Hicketts
- Greg Hickey
- Pat Hickey
- Thomas Hickey
- Alex Hicks
- Doug Hicks
- Glenn Hicks
- Hal Hicks
- Wayne Hicks
- Andre Hidi
- Uli Hiemer
- Chris Higgins
- Matt Higgins
- Paul Higgins
- Tim Higgins
- Matthew Highmore
- Hec Highton
- Andy Hilbert
- Ike Hildebrand
- Adin Hill
- Al Hill
- Brian Hill
- Mel Hill
- Sean Hill
- Jack Hillen
- Jim Hiller
- Jonas Hiller
- Wilbert Hiller
- Randy Hillier
- Cameron Hillis
- Blake Hillman
- Floyd Hillman
- Larry Hillman
- Wayne Hillman
- John Hilworth
- Norman Himes
- Dave Hindmarch
- Vinnie Hinostroza
- Dan Hinote
- Andre Hinse
- Dan Hinton
- Roope Hintz
- Akito Hirose
- Taro Hirose
- Corey Hirsch
- Tom Hirsch
- Bert Hirschfeld
- Nico Hischier
- Joey Hishon
- Jamie Hislop
- Lionel Hitchman
- Niklas Hjalmarsson
- Jan Hlavac
- Ivan Hlinka
- Jaroslav Hlinka
- Todd Hlushko
- Shane Hnidy
- Milan Hnilicka

== Hoc–Hol ==
- Joshua Ho-Sang
- Justin Hocking
- Charlie Hodge
- Ken Hodge
- Ken Hodge, Jr.
- Tom Hodges
- Justin Hodgman
- Cody Hodgson
- Dan Hodgson
- Hayden Hodgson
- Rick Hodgson
- Ted Hodgson
- Kevin Hodson
- Cecil Hoekstra
- Ed Hoekstra
- Phil Hoene
- Joel Hofer
- Vic Hoffinger
- Mike Hoffman (born 1963)
- Mike Hoffman (born 1989)
- Bob Hoffmeyer
- Jim Hofford
- Bruce Hoffort
- Gregory Hofmann
- Bill Hogaboam
- Dale Hoganson
- Paul Hoganson
- Linus Hogberg
- Marcus Hogberg
- Jeff Hoggan
- Nils Hoglander
- Jonas Hoglund
- Goran Hogosta
- Benoit Hogue
- Milos Holan
- Terry Holbrook
- Josh Holden
- Mark Holden
- Nick Holden
- Bobby Holik
- Justin Holl
- Jason Holland
- Jerry Holland
- Ken Holland
- Patrick Holland
- Peter Holland
- Robert Holland
- Flash Hollett
- Terry Hollinger
- Bucky Hollingworth
- Bruce Holloway
- George "Bud" Holloway
- Dylan Holloway
- Mac Hollowell
- Ryan Hollweg
- Philip Holm
- Pontus Holmberg
- Bill Holmes
- Charlie Holmes
- Hap Holmes
- Louis Holmes
- Warren Holmes
- Paul Holmgren
- Johan Holmqvist
- Michael Holmqvist
- Ben Holmstrom
- Simon Holmstrom
- Tomas Holmstrom
- Jonas Holos
- Johnny Holota
- Greg Holst
- Chris Holt
- Gary Holt
- Randy Holt
- Braden Holtby
- Alexander Holtz
- Albert Holway
- Korbinian Holzer
- Brian Holzinger

== Hom–Hoy ==
- Ron Homenuke
- Julius Honka
- Ron Hoover
- Dean Hopkins
- Larry Hopkins
- Tony Horacek
- Miloslav Horava
- Doug Horbul
- Shawn Horcoff
- Darcy Hordichuk
- Mike Hordy
- Pete Horeck
- George Horne
- Red Horner
- Patric Hornqvist
- Larry Hornung
- Nathan Horton
- Tim Horton
- Bo Horvat
- Bronco Horvath
- Ed Hospodar
- Marcel Hossa
- Marian Hossa
- Martin Hostak
- Greg Hotham
- Paul Houck
- Doug Houda
- Claude Houde
- Eric Houde
- Mike Hough
- Bill Houlder
- Martin Houle
- Rejean Houle
- Phil Housley
- Ken Houston
- Jack Howard
- Jimmy Howard
- Garry Howatt
- Brett Howden
- Quinton Howden
- Gordie Howe
- Mark Howe
- Marty Howe
- Syd Howe
- Vic Howe
- Harry Howell
- Ron Howell
- Don Howse
- Scott Howson
- Dave Hoyda

== Hr–Hy ==
- Raman Hrabarenka
- Jan Hrdina
- Jiri Hrdina
- Dave Hrechkosy
- Marek Hrivik
- Jim Hrivnak
- Tony Hrkac
- Filip Hronek
- Kelly Hrudey
- Jim Hrycuik
- Steve Hrymnak
- Tim Hrynewich
- Bill Huard
- Rolly Huard
- Petr Hubacek
- Willie Huber
- Jonathan Huberdeau
- Greg Hubick
- Fran Huck
- Fred Hucul
- Charlie Huddy
- Jiri Hudler
- Charles Hudon
- Dave Hudson
- Lex Hudson
- Mike Hudson
- Ron Hudson
- Cristobal Huet
- Kerry Huffman
- Al Huggins
- Albert Hughes
- Brent Hughes (born 1943)
- Brent Hughes (born 1966)
- Cameron Hughes
- Frank Hughes
- Howie Hughes
- Jack Hughes (born 1957)
- Jack Hughes (born 2001)
- James Hughes
- John Hughes
- Luke Hughes
- Pat Hughes
- Quinn Hughes
- Ryan Hughes
- Joe Hulbig
- Bobby Hull
- Brett Hull
- Dennis Hull
- Jody Hull
- Cale Hulse
- Brad Hunt
- Daemon Hunt
- Dryden Hunt
- Fred Hunt
- Jamie Hunt
- Dale Hunter
- Dave Hunter
- Mark Hunter
- Tim Hunter
- Trent Hunter
- Matt Hunwick
- Larry Huras
- Bob Hurlburt
- Mike Hurlbut
- Paul Hurley
- Jani Hurme
- Ron Hurst
- Jamie Huscroft
- Kristian Huselius
- Adam Huska
- Ryan Huska
- Kent Huskins
- Matt Hussey
- Ville Husso
- Ron Huston
- Andrew Hutchinson
- Michael Hutchinson
- Ron Hutchinson
- Dave Hutchison
- Lane Hutson
- Ben Hutton
- Bill Hutton
- Carter Hutton
- Grant Hutton
- Tomas Hyka
- Harry Hyland
- Zach Hyman
- Dave Hynes
- Gord Hynes
- Hannes Hyvonen

== See also ==
- hockeydb.com NHL Player List - H
