= Johnny Sheppard =

Canadian ice hockey player

- Born: July 27, 1902 Montreal, Quebec, Canada
- Died: August 28, 1969 (aged 67) near Bowen Island, British Columbia, Canada
- Height: 5 ft 6 in (168 cm)
- Weight: 165 lb (75 kg; 11 st 11 lb)
- Position: Left wing
- Shot: Left
- Played for: Chicago Black Hawks; Boston Bruins; New York Americans; Detroit Cougars; Edmonton Eskimos
- Playing career: 1922–1936

Joseph John Oswald "Jake" Sheppard (July 27, 1902 – August 28, 1969) was a Canadian professional ice hockey forward who played nine seasons in the National Hockey League with the Detroit Cougars, New York Americans, Boston Bruins, and Chicago Black Hawks from 1926 to 1934. Johnny was the brother of the former NHL player, Frank Sheppard. He was born in Montreal, Quebec but grew up in Selkirk, Manitoba.

== Playing career ==
Sheppard began his career with the Selkirk Jr. Fisherman of the Manitoba Junior Hockey League and Edmonton Eskimos of the Western Canada Hockey League. He joined the Detroit Cougars in the team's inaugural season of 1926–27, in which he played 43 games and led the team in goals (13), assists (8), points (21), and penalty minutes (60). On November 22, 1927, Sheppard scored the first goal at the new Detroit Olympia against Ottawa Senators' goaltender Alex Connell.

Sheppard was traded to the New York Americans, where he played five seasons and posted career highs in goals (17 in 1932–33) and points (29 in 1929–30). He also played for the Bronx Tigers of the Canadian-American Hockey League in 1931–32. Before his final NHL season in 1933–34, Sheppard was traded from the Americans to the Bruins, who released him after four games. He signed with the Black Hawks and helped the team win the Stanley Cup.

== Career statistics ==
=== Regular season and playoffs ===
			Regular season					Playoffs
Season	Team	League	GP	G	A	Pts	PIM	GP	G	A	Pts	PIM
1918–19	Selkirk Jr. Fishermen	MJHL	—	—	—	—	—	—	—	—	—	—
1919–20	Selkirk Jr. Fishermen	MJHL	—	—	—	—	—	—	—	—	—	—
1919–20	Selkirk Jr. Fishermen	M-Cup	—	—	—	—	—	4	3	3	6	0
1920–21	Selkirk Jr. Fishermen	MJHL	—	—	—	—	—	—	—	—	—	—
1921–22	Selkirk Fishermen	MHL	11	10	2	12	19	—	—	—	—	—
1922–23	Edmonton Eskimos	WCHL	21	1	1	2	6	2	0	0	0	0
1923–23	Edmonton Eskimos	St-Cup	—	—	—	—	—	1	0	0	0	0
1923–24	Edmonton Eskimos	WCHL	25	6	2	8	14	—	—	—	—	—
1924–25	Edmonton Eskimos	WCHL	28	14	4	18	26	—	—	—	—	—
1925–26	Edmonton Eskimos	WHL	23	7	7	14	16	2	1	0	1	2
1926–27	Detroit Cougars	NHL	43	13	8	21	60	—	—	—	—	—
1927–28	Detroit Cougars	NHL	44	10	10	20	40	—	—	—	—	—
1928–29	New York Americans	NHL	43	5	4	9	38	2	0	0	0	0
1929–30	New York Americans	NHL	43	14	15	29	32	—	—	—	—	—
1930–31	New York Americans	NHL	42	5	8	13	16	—	—	—	—	—
1931–32	New York Americans	NHL	5	1	0	1	2	—	—	—	—	—
1931–32	Bronx Tigers	Can-Am	33	17	11	28	27	2	1	0	1	2
1932–33	New York Americans	NHL	46	17	9	26	32	—	—	—	—	—
1933–34	Boston Bruins	NHL	4	0	0	0	0	—	—	—	—	—
1933–34	Chicago Black Hawks	NHL	38	3	4	7	4	8	0	0	0	0
1934–35	Seattle Seahawks	NWHL	36	6	17	23	38	5	2	2	4	0
1935–36	Seattle Seahawks	NWHL	39	13	10	23	29	4	2	4	6	2
WCHL/WHL totals			97	28	14	42	62	4	1	0	1	2
NHL totals			308	68	58	126	224	10	0	0	0	0

== Awards and achievements ==
- Stanley Cup Championships (1934)
