= Dutch Gainor =

Canadian ice hockey player

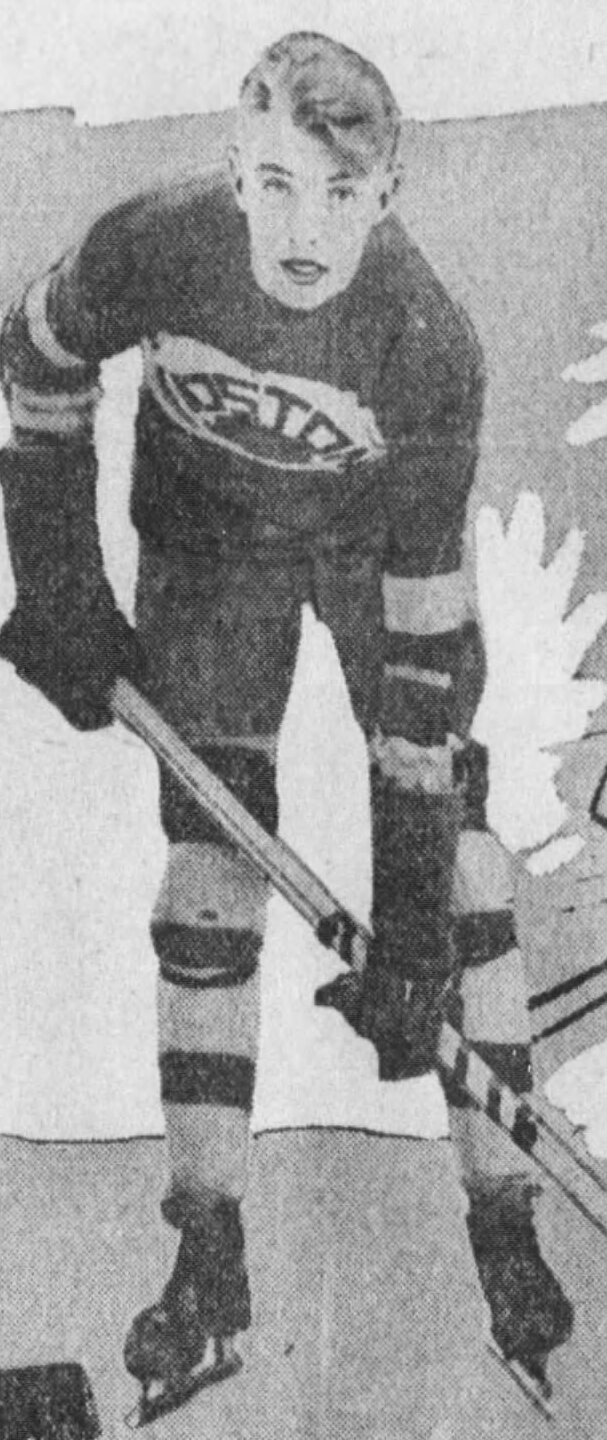
- Born: April 10, 1904; Calgary, Northwest Territories, Canada
- Died: January 16, 1962 (aged 57); Edmonton, Alberta, Canada
- Height: 6 ft 1 in (185 cm)
- Weight: 170 lb (77 kg; 12 st 2 lb)
- Position: Centre
- Shot: Left
- Played for: Boston Bruins; New York Rangers; Ottawa Senators; Montreal Maroons
- Playing career: 1925–1936

James Norman "Norm, Dutch" Gainor (April 10, 1904 – January 16, 1962) was a Canadian ice hockey professional forward. Gainor was most notable for playing on the Boston Bruins' 1928 "Dynamite Line" with Cooney Weiland and Dit Clapper, one of the earliest "named" forward lines in National Hockey League (NHL) history.

Gainor started his NHL career with the Boston Bruins, later playing for the Ottawa Senators, New York Rangers and Montreal Maroons. His career started in 1927 and he retired after 1935. He was a member of two Stanley Cup-winning teams in his career, once with Boston in 1929 and again with the Maroons in 1935.

Gainor scored his first NHL goal on November 29, 1927. It occurred in Boston's 4-0 victory over the Montreal Maroons.

== Career statistics ==
=== Regular season and playoffs ===
			Regular season					Playoffs
Season	Team	League	GP	G	A	Pts	PIM	GP	G	A	Pts	PIM
1923–24	Bellevue Bulldogs	ASHL	—	—	—	—	—	—	—	—	—	—
1923–24	Bellevue Bulldogs	Al-Cup	—	—	—	—	—	1	0	0	0	0
1924–25	Crowsnest Pass	ASHL	—	—	—	—	—	—	—	—	—	—
1925–26	Duluth Hornets	CHL	15	1	0	1	0	5	0	0	0	0
1926–27	Calgary Tigers	PrHL	23	16	11	27	38	2	0	0	0	0
1927–28	Boston Bruins	NHL	42	8	4	12	35	2	0	0	0	6
1928–29	Boston Bruins	NHL	44	14	5	19	30	5	2	0	2	4
1929–30	Boston Bruins	NHL	42	18	31	49	39	3	0	0	0	0
1930–31	Boston Bruins	NHL	35	8	3	11	14	5	0	1	1	2
1931–32	New York Rangers	NHL	46	3	9	12	9	7	0	0	0	2
1932–33	Springfield Indians	Can-Am	13	7	5	12	—	—	—	—	—	—
1932–33	Ottawa Senators	NHL	2	0	0	0	0	—	—	—	—	—
1932–33	Saskatoon Crescents	WCHL	21	10	11	21	4	—	—	—	—	—
1933–34	Calgary Tigers	NWHL	34	23	19	42	24	5	2	0	2	2
1934–35	Montreal Maroons	NHL	35	0	4	4	2	—	—	—	—	—
1935–36	Calgary Tigers	NWHL	40	21	14	35	6	—	—	—	—	—
1936–37	Portland Buckaroos	PCHL	13	0	0	0	0	—	—	—	—	—
NHL totals			246	51	56	107	129	22	2	1	3	14
