= Bill Hutton =

Canadian ice hockey player

- Born: January 28, 1910 Calgary, Alberta, Canada
- Died: March 1, 1974 (aged 64) Vancouver, British Columbia, Canada
- Height: 5 ft 11 in (180 cm)
- Weight: 165 lb (75 kg; 11 st 11 lb)
- Position: Defence
- Shot: Right
- Played for: Boston Bruins; Ottawa Senators; Philadelphia Quakers
- Playing career: 1929–1944

William David Hutton (January 28, 1910 – March 1, 1974) was a Canadian professional ice hockey defenceman who played two seasons in the National Hockey League (NHL) for the Ottawa Senators, Boston Bruins and Philadelphia Quakers.

At 5 feet 10 inches (178 cm), and 165 pounds (75 kg), Hutton played for the Calgary Canadians from 1927 to 1929, Boston Bruins from 1929 to 1931, Ottawa Senators from 1929 to 1930, Philadelphia Arrows from 1929 to 1930, Philadelphia Quakers from 1930 to 1931, Boston Cubs from 1931 to 1932, Detroit Olympics from 1931 to 1932, Duluth Hornets from 1931 to 1932, Syracuse Stars from 1931 to 1932, Calgary Tigers from 1932 to 1934, Vancouver Lions from 1934 to 1941, Tulsa Oilers from 1941 to 1942, and Vancouver St. Regis from 1942 to 1944.

== Career statistics ==
=== Regular season and playoffs ===
			Regular season					Playoffs
Season	Team	League	GP	G	A	Pts	PIM	GP	G	A	Pts	PIM
1927–28	Calgary Canadians	Exhib	11	0	0	0	9	—	—	—	—	—
1927–28	Calgary Canadians	M-Cup	—	—	—	—	—	2	1	0	1	2
1928–29	Calgary Canadians	CCJHL	3	4	3	7	2	—	—	—	—	—
1928–29	Calgary Canadians	M-Cup	—	—	—	—	—	9	6	5	11	10
1929–30	Boston Bruins	NHL	16	2	0	2	2	—	—	—	—	—
1929–30	Ottawa Senators	NHL	18	0	1	1	0	2	0	0	0	0
1929–30	Philadelphia Arrows	Can-Am	6	1	1	2	0	—	—	—	—	—
1930–31	Boston Bruins	NHL	9	0	0	0	2	—	—	—	—	—
1930–31	Philadelphia Quakers	NHL	21	1	1	2	4	—	—	—	—	—
1931–32	Boston Cubs	Can-Am	6	0	0	0	2	—	—	—	—	—
1931–32	Detroit Olympics	IHL	4	0	0	0	0	—	—	—	—	—
1931–32	Syracuse Stars	IHL	4	0	0	0	0	—	—	—	—	—
1931–32	Duluth Hornets	AHA	2	0	0	0	0	—	—	—	—	—
1932–33	Calgary Tigers	WCHL	30	6	3	9	10	6	0	0	0	4
1933–34	Calgary Tigers	NWHL	32	11	1	12	25	5	2	0	2	2
1934–35	Vancouver Lions	NWHL	32	5	10	15	34	8	1	0	1	2
1935–36	Vancouver Lions	NWHL	40	4	7	11	10	7	0	0	0	2
1936–37	Spokane Clippers	PCHL	40	9	7	16	10	6	1	0	1	2
1937–38	Vancouver Lions	PCHL	42	4	5	9	24	6	1	1	2	4
1938–39	Vancouver Lions	PCHL	47	9	15	24	30	2	0	0	0	5
1939–40	Vancouver Lions	PCHL	39	7	3	10	28	5	1	3	4	4
1940–41	Vancouver Lions	PCHL	47	9	18	27	37	6	1	1	2	6
1941–42	Tulsa Oilers	AHA	50	5	8	13	12	2	1	0	1	0
1942–43	Vancouver St. Regis	PCHL	10	1	3	4	6	5	2	0	2	4
1943–44	Vancouver St. Regis	PCHL	23	5	7	12	6	3	0	0	0	2
PCHL totals			248	44	58	102	141	33	6	5	11	27
NHL totals			64	3	2	5	8	2	0	0	0	0
