= 1930–31 New York Rangers season =

NHL hockey team season

1930–31 New York Rangers
- Division: 3rd American
- 1930–31 record: 19–16–9
- Home record: 10–9–3
- Road record: 9–7–6
- Goals for: 106
- Goals against: 87

Team information
- General manager: Lester Patrick
- Coach: Lester Patrick
- Captain: Bill Cook
- Arena: Madison Square Garden

Team leaders
- Goals: Bill Cook (30)
- Assists: Frank Boucher (27)
- Points: Bill Cook (42)
- Penalty minutes: Ching Johnson (77)
- Wins: John Ross Roach (19)
- Goals against average: John Ross Roach (1.89)

The 1930–31 New York Rangers season was the franchise's fifth season. In the regular season, the Rangers finished third in the American Division with a 19–16–9 record. New York qualified for the Stanley Cup playoffs, where the Rangers defeated the Montreal Maroons 8–1 in a two-game, total goals series, but lost to the Chicago Black Hawks 3 goals to 0 in the semi-finals.

== Regular season ==
=== Final standings ===
American Division
	GP	W	L	T	GF	GA	PTS
**Boston Bruins**	44	28	10	6	143	90	62
**Chicago Black Hawks**	44	24	17	3	108	78	51
**New York Rangers**	44	19	16	9	106	87	47
Detroit Falcons	44	16	21	7	102	105	39
Philadelphia Quakers	44	4	36	4	76	184	12

Note: GP = Games Played, W = Wins, L = Losses, T = Ties, Pts = Points, GF = Goals For, GA = Goals Against
Teams that qualified for the playoffs are highlighted in bold.

=== Record vs. opponents ===
==== Vs. American Division ====
1930–31 NHL records
Team	**BOS**	**CHI**	**DET**	**NYR**	**PHI**	**Total**
Boston	—	2–4	4–1–1	4–0–2	5–0–1	**15–5–4**
Chicago	4–2	—	2–3–1	4–1–1	6–0	**16–6–2**
Detroit	1–4–1	3–2–1	—	2–3–1	4–2	**10–11–3**
N.Y. Rangers	0–4–2	1–4–1	3–2–1	—	6–0	**10–10–4**
Philadelphia	0–5–1	0–6	2–4	0–6	—	**2–21–1**

==== Vs. Canadian Division ====
1930–31 NHL records
Team	**MTL**	**MTM**	**NYA**	**OTT**	**TOR**	**Total**
Boston	1–2–1	3–1	2–2	4–0	2–1–1	**12–6–2**
Chicago	0–3–1	0–4	3–1	4–0	0–4	**7–12–1**
Detroit	2–2	0–3–1	0–2–2	2–2	2–1–1	**6–10–4**
N.Y. Rangers	2–2	2–1–1	1–0–3	3–1	1–2–1	**9–6–5**
Philadelphia	0–3–1	1–3	0–3–1	0–3–1	1–3	**2–15–3**

== Schedule and results ==
1930–31 regular season
November: 3–3–2 (home: 1–1–1; road: 2–2–1)

Game	November	Opponent	Score	Record
1	11	@ Philadelphia Quakers	3–0	1–0–0
2	13	@ Detroit Falcons	1–0	1–1–0
3	16	@ Chicago Black Hawks	1 – 1 OT	1–1–1
4	18	New York Americans	0 – 0 OT	1–1–2
5	23	Philadelphia Quakers	5–2	2–1–2
6	25	@ Montreal Maroons	5–2	2–2–2
7	27	Chicago Black Hawks	4–0	2–3–2
8	29	@ Philadelphia Quakers	6–3	3–3–2

December: 5–3–2 (home: 4–1–0; road: 1–2–2)

Game	December	Opponent	Score	Record
9	4	@ Montreal Canadiens	5–4	3–4–2
10	6	@ Toronto Maple Leafs	4–2	3–5–2
11	9	Ottawa Senators	3–2	4–5–2
12	14	Detroit Falcons	3–0	5–5–2
13	18	Boston Bruins	4–2	5–6–2
14	20	@ Boston Bruins	2 – 2 OT	5–6–3
15	23	Montreal Canadiens	5–1	6–6–3
16	25	@ Ottawa Senators	4–1	7–6–3
17	28	Philadelphia Quakers	4–2	8–6–3
18	30	@ New York Americans	2 – 2 OT	8–6–4

January: 2–6–3 (home: 1–5–1; road: 1–1–2)

Game	January	Opponent	Score	Record
19	1	Boston Bruins	4 – 3 OT	8–7–4
20	6	Montreal Maroons	5–1	9–7–4
21	8	@ Detroit Falcons	1–0	10–7–4
22	11	Chicago Black Hawks	2–0	10–8–4
23	13	@ Boston Bruins	2 – 2 OT	10–8–5
24	15	Toronto Maple Leafs	1 – 1 OT	10–8–6
25	18	@ Chicago Black Hawks	2–1	10–9–6
26	20	Montreal Canadiens	3 – 2 OT	10–10–6
27	25	Detroit Falcons	1–0	10–11–6
28	29	Boston Bruins	4–3	10–12–6
29	31	@ Montreal Maroons	2 – 2 OT	10–12–7

February: 6–2–1 (home: 3–2–0; road: 3–0–1)

Game	February	Opponent	Score	Record
30	3	Montreal Maroons	3–0	11–12–7
31	5	@ New York Americans	2–0	12–12–7
32	8	Chicago Black Hawks	3–2	12–13–7
33	10	@ Philadelphia Quakers	3–1	13–13–7
34	12	@ Detroit Falcons	1 – 1 OT	13–13–8
35	15	@ Chicago Black Hawks	2–1	14–13–8
36	17	Ottawa Senators	5–4	14–14–8
37	22	Philadelphia Quakers	6–1	15–14–8
38	26	Toronto Maple Leafs	4–1	16–14–8

March: 3–2–1 (home: 1–0–1; road: 2–2–0)

Game	March	Opponent	Score	Record
39	3	@ Boston Bruins	4–1	16–15–8
40	5	@ Montreal Canadiens	2–1	17–15–8
41	7	@ Toronto Maple Leafs	5–2	17–16–8
42	10	Detroit Falcons	3 – 2 OT	18–16–8
43	15	New York Americans	0 – 0 OT	18–16–9
44	17	@ Ottawa Senators	3–1	19–16–9

Legend: Win (2 points) Loss (0 points) Tie (1 point)

== Playoffs ==
1931 Stanley Cup playoffs
Quarterfinals vs. (C3) Montreal Maroons – Rangers win 8 goals to 1 goal

Game	Date	Visitor	Score	Home	OT	Series
1	March 24	Montreal Maroons	1–5	New York Rangers		New York Rangers lead series 5 goals to 1 goal
2	March 26	New York Rangers	3–0	Montreal Maroons		New York Rangers win series 8 goals to 1 goal

Semifinals vs. (A2) Chicago Black Hawks – Black Hawks win 3 goals to 0 goals

Game	Date	Visitor	Score	Home	OT	Series
1	March 28	New York Rangers	0–2	Chicago Black Hawks		Chicago leads series 2 goals to 0 goals
2	March 30	Chicago Black Hawks	1–0	New York Rangers		Chicago wins series 3 goals to 0 goals

Legend: Win Loss

== Player statistics ==
Skaters

Regular season
Player	GP	G	A	Pts	PIM
Bill Cook	44	30	12	42	39
Frank Boucher	44	12	27	39	20
Frederick Cook	44	18	17	35	72
Melville Keeling	44	13	9	22	35
Murray Murdoch	44	7	7	14	8
Paul Thompson	44	7	7	14	36
Joe Jerwa	33	4	7	11	72
Cecil Dillon	25	7	3	10	8
Ivan Johnson	44	2	6	8	77
Bud Maracle	11	1	3	4	4
Frank Waite	17	1	3	4	4
Bill Regan	42	2	1	3	49
Eddie Rodden	24	0	3	3	8
Gene Carrigan	33	2	0	2	13
Sammy McAdam	4	0	0	0	0
Ernie Kenny	6	0	0	0	0
Leo Bourgeault^{‡}	10	0	0	0	0
Frank Peters	44	0	0	0	59

Playoffs
Player	GP	G	A	Pts	PIM
Paul Thompson	4	3	0	3	2
Bill Cook	4	3	0	3	4
Murray Murdoch	4	0	2	2	0
Melville Keeling	4	1	1	2	0
Frank Boucher	4	0	2	2	0
Ivan Johnson	4	1	0	1	17
Cecil Dillon	4	0	1	1	0
Frank Peters	4	0	0	0	2
Bill Regan	4	0	0	0	2
Bud Maracle	4	0	0	0	2
Joe Jerwa	4	0	0	0	4
Frederick Cook	4	0	0	0	2

Goaltenders

Regular season
Player	GP	TOI	W	L	T	GA	GAA	SO
John Ross Roach	44	2760	19	16	9	87	1.89	7

Regular season
Player	GP	TOI	W	L	T	GA	GAA	SO
John Ross Roach	4	240	2	2	0	4	1.00	1

^{†}Denotes player spent time with another team before joining Rangers. Stats reflect time with Rangers only.
^{‡}Traded mid-season. Stats reflect time with Rangers only.

Note:

Pos = Position;GP = Games played; G = Goals; A = Assists; Pts = Points; PIM = Penalty minutes; +/- = Plus/minus; PPG = Power-play goals; SHG = Short-handed goals; GWG = Game-winning goals
Pos = Position;GP = Games played; Min, TOI = Minutes played; W = Wins; L = Losses; T,T/OT = Ties; OTL = Overtime losses; GA = Goals-against; GAA = Goals-against average; SO = Shutouts; SA = Shots against; SV = Shots saved;SV% = Save percentage;

== See also ==
- 1930–31 NHL season
