= Lloyd Jackson (ice hockey) =

Canadian ice hockey player

- Born: January 7, 1912 Ottawa, Ontario, Canada
- Died: February 15, 1999 (aged 87)
- Height: 5 ft 9 in (175 cm)
- Weight: 150 lb (68 kg; 10 st 10 lb)
- Position: Centre
- Shot: Left
- Played for: New York Americans
- Playing career: 1931–1942

Lloyd Edgar Jackson (January 7, 1912 in Ottawa, Ontario — February 15, 1999) was a Canadian professional ice hockey player who played 14 games in the National Hockey League with the New York Americans during the 1936–37 season. The rest of his career, which lasted from 1931 to 1942, was spent in various minor leagues.

== Career statistics ==
=== Regular season and playoffs ===
			Regular season					Playoffs
Season	Team	League	GP	G	A	Pts	PIM	GP	G	A	Pts	PIM
1929–30	Ottawa Montagnards	OCHL	12	8	3	11	2	2	1	0	1	4
1930–31	Ottawa Montagnards	OCHL	4	0	2	2	0	—	—	—	—	—
1930–31	New Glasgow Tigers	ENSSHL	24	15	5	20	14	2	0	0	0	2
1931–32	New Haven Eagles	Can-Am	40	9	11	20	3	2	1	0	1	0
1932–33	New Haven Eagles	Can-Am	36	4	14	18	16	—	—	—	—	—
1933–34	Syracuse Stars	IHL	16	3	1	4	2	—	—	—	—	—
1933–34	Seattle Seahawks	NWHL	22	9	9	18	4	—	—	—	—	—
1934–35	New Haven Eagles	Can-Am	47	23	35	58	10	—	—	—	—	—
1935–36	New Haven Eagles	Can-Am	47	17	28	45	3	—	—	—	—	—
1936–37	New York Americans	NHL	11	1	2	3	0	—	—	—	—	—
1936–37	New Haven Eagles	IAHL	44	6	19	25	2	—	—	—	—	—
1937–38	New Haven Eagles	IAHL	13	1	6	7	2	—	—	—	—	—
1937–38	Springfield Indians	IAHL	31	3	7	10	0	—	—	—	—	—
1938–39	Springfield Indians	IAHL	51	10	16	26	6	3	1	0	1	0
1939–40	Springfield Indians	IAHL	54	10	22	32	2	3	1	0	1	0
1940–41	Tulsa Oilers	AHA	15	5	5	10	0	—	—	—	—	—
1940–41	Kansas City Americans	AHA	24	5	8	13	12	—	—	—	—	—
1941–42	Fort Worth Rangers	AHA	50	15	37	52	2	5	2	3	5	2
Can-Am totals			170	53	88	141	32	2	1	0	1	0
IAHL totals			193	30	70	100	12	6	2	0	2	0
NHL totals			11	1	2	3	0	—	—	—	—	—
