= Ty Arbour =

Canadian ice hockey player

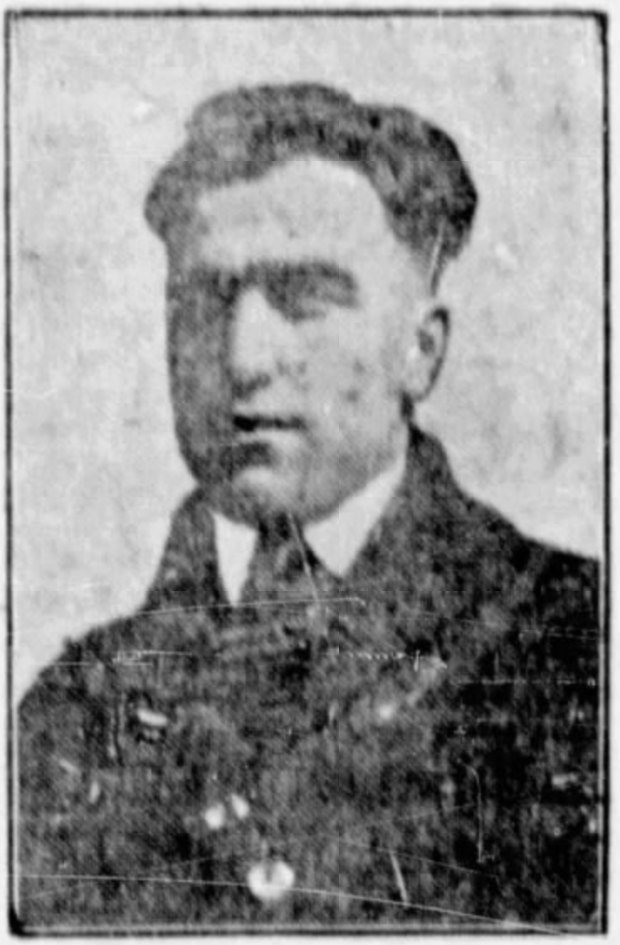
- Arbour circa 1924
- Born: June 29, 1896 Waubaushene, Ontario, Canada
- Died: February 11, 1979 (aged 82)
- Height: 5 ft 7 in (170 cm)
- Weight: 160 lb (73 kg; 11 st 6 lb)
- Position: Left wing
- Shot: Left
- Played for: Pittsburgh Pirates; Chicago Black Hawks; Edmonton Eskimos; Vancouver Maroons
- Playing career: 1922–1936

Joseph Merille Ernest "Ty" Arbour (June 29, 1896 – February 11, 1979) was a professional ice hockey player in the National Hockey League and the Western Canada Hockey League.

Arbour was born in Waubaushene, Ontario. The elder brother of Jack Arbour, Ty began his career out west following his service during World War I. He would go on to play for the Pittsburgh Pirates and captain the Chicago Black Hawks of the NHL before finishing his career in the minors.

== Career statistics ==
=== Regular season and playoffs ===
| | | | Regular season | | | | | Playoffs |
| Season | Team | League | GP | G | A | Pts | PIM | GP | G | A | Pts | PIM |
|---|---|---|---|---|---|---|---|---|---|---|---|---|
| 1918–19 | Port Arthur Pascoes | TBSHL | 6 | 8 | 1 | 9 | 4 | — | — | — | — | — |
| 1918–19 | Port Arthur Columbus Club | Al-Cup | — | — | — | — | — | 1 | 1 | 0 | 1 | 0 |
| 1919–20 | Midland Aces | OHA-Sr. | — | — | — | — | — | — | — | — | — | — |
| 1920–21 | Brandon Wheat City | MHA-Sr. | 12 | 11 | 4 | 15 | 4 | — | — | — | — | — |
| 1920–21 | Brandon Wheat City | Al-Cup | — | — | — | — | — | 6 | 9 | 7 | 16 | 4 |
| 1921–22 | Edmonton Eskimos | WCHL | 24 | 27 | 6 | 33 | 22 | 2 | 0 | 0 | 0 | 2 |
| 1922–23 | Edmonton Eskimos | WCHL | 30 | 18 | 9 | 27 | 10 | 2 | 0 | 1 | 1 | 0 |
| 1922–23 | Edmonton Eskimos | St-Cup | — | — | — | — | — | 2 | 0 | 0 | 0 | 0 |
| 1923–24 | Edmonton Eskimos | WCHL | 30 | 13 | 5 | 18 | 12 | — | — | — | — | — |
| 1924–25 | Vancouver Maroons | WCHL | 27 | 15 | 5 | 20 | 12 | — | — | — | — | — |
| 1925–26 | Vancouver Maroons | WHL | 30 | 10 | 6 | 16 | 6 | — | — | — | — | — |
| 1926–27 | Pittsburgh Pirates | NHL | 41 | 7 | 8 | 15 | 10 | — | — | — | — | — |
| 1927–28 | Pittsburgh Pirates | NHL | 7 | 0 | 0 | 0 | 0 | — | — | — | — | — |
| 1927–28 | Chicago Black Hawks | NHL | 32 | 5 | 5 | 10 | 32 | — | — | — | — | — |
| 1928–29 | Chicago Black Hawks | NHL | 44 | 3 | 4 | 7 | 32 | — | — | — | — | — |
| 1929–30 | Chicago Black Hawks | NHL | 42 | 10 | 8 | 18 | 26 | 2 | 1 | 0 | 1 | 0 |
| 1930–31 | Chicago Black Hawks | NHL | 41 | 3 | 3 | 6 | 12 | 9 | 1 | 0 | 1 | 6 |
| 1931–32 | Pittsburgh Yellow Jackets | IHL | 47 | 13 | 3 | 16 | 10 | — | — | — | — | — |
| 1932–33 | Buffalo Bisons | IHL | 17 | 2 | 1 | 3 | 4 | — | — | — | — | — |
| 1933–34 | Edmonton Eskimos | NWHL | 33 | 18 | 8 | 26 | 2 | 1 | 0 | 0 | 0 | 0 |
| WCHL/WHL totals | | | 140 | 82 | 32 | 114 | 62 | 4 | 0 | 1 | 1 | 2 |
| NHL totals | | | 207 | 28 | 28 | 56 | 112 | 11 | 2 | 0 | 2 | 6 |

| Preceded by Duke Dukowski | Chicago Black Hawks captain 1930–31 | Succeeded by Cy Wentworth |
