= Spokane Bombers =

- City: Spokane, Washington
- League: Pacific Coast Hockey League
- Founded: 1936
- Folded: 1941
- Home arena: Oakland Ice Rink (1936–1937); Spokane Arena (1937–1941)

Franchise history
- 1936: Spokane Indians
- 1936–1937: Oakland Clippers
- 1937–1939: Spokane Clippers
- 1940–1941: Spokane Bombers

The Spokane Bombers were a minor professional ice hockey team from Spokane, Washington that played in the Pacific Coast Hockey League.

== History ==
In 1936, three teams from the North West Hockey League made plans to reform the PCHL and included a new franchise from Spokane in their plans. The Spokane Indians were scheduled to begin play in the fall of 1936, however, before the team played its first game, owner Arthur C. Rud changed tack and relocated the team to Oakland, California. The renamed club began play as the 'Clippers' but very quickly discovered several problems with their move. The team's home arena, the Oakland Ice Rink, had several columns in the stands that led to obstructed views. That problem was secondary, however, to the dearth of spectators as the team did not draw many fans for their games. The poor attendance numbers exacerbated the financial strain that was caused by the team having to travel long distances to face any of their league opponents. After a snowstorm in early February caused two games to be delayed and one of Oakland's 'home' games to be played in Portland, Rud decided to end his foray into California and moved the team back to Spokane. The turmoil of the year left the Clippers 3rd in the 4-team league but they managed to win their semifinal series and advance to the championship.

The second season wasn't any better for the club as they ended up missing the playoffs and saw continued poor attendance. After the start of the third season, Rud announced that he was looking to sell the team but there were few willing to spend the time or money to try and save the Clippers. On November 21, Rud withdrew the club from the PCHL and the team suspended operations. After a week, Rud was eventually convinced to turn over control of the Clippers to the players who, in order to keep the team alive, agreed to halve their salaries and travel by car instead of train. Rud remained owner of the club in name until it was sold to Roy Hotchkiss and H.R. Gilkey, who jointly owned a car dealership. The Clippers finished out the season and then quietly disbanded.

A year later, the franchise restarted as the 'Bombers' and finished first in the league. Unfortunately, the timing could not have come at a worse time; due in part to World War II, the PCHL suspended play after the season. When it returned three years later, the Spokane franchise was left dormant.

== Year-by-year results ==
Season	GP	W	L	T	Pts	Finish	Coach(es)	Postseason
1936–37	40	14	19	7	35	3rd	Jack Arbour	Runner-Up
1937–38	42	16	21	5	37	4th	Jack Arbour	missed
1938–39	48	14	27	7	35	4th	Jack Arbour / Connie King	missed
1940–41	48	25	18	5	55	1st		

== Notable players ==
- Jack Arbour
- Henry Dyck
- Irv Frew
- Paul Gauthier
- Louis Holmes
- Bill Hutton
- Ernie Kenny
- Pete Leswick
- Sammy McAdam
- Stan McCabe
- Walter McCartney
- Ron Moffat
- Hal Picketts
- Vic Ripley
- Des Roche
- Aubrey Webster
