= Ernie Kenny =

Canadian ice hockey player

- Born: August 20, 1907; Vermilion, Alberta, Canada
- Died: June 2, 1970 (aged 62); St. Thomas, Ontario, Canada
- Height: 6 ft 2 in (188 cm)
- Weight: 195 lb (88 kg; 13 st 13 lb)
- Position: Defence
- Shot: Left
- Played for: New York Rangers; Chicago Black Hawks
- Playing career: 1928–1940

William Ernest Kenny (August 20, 1907 – June 2, 1970) was a Canadian ice hockey defenceman. He played 10 games in the National Hockey League: 6 with the New York Rangers during the 1930–31 season, and 4 with the Chicago Black Hawks during the 1934–35 season. The rest of his career, which lasted from 1928 to 1940, was spent in various minor leagues.

== Career statistics ==
=== Regular season and playoffs ===
| | | | Regular season | | | | | Playoffs |
| Season | Team | League | GP | G | A | Pts | PIM | GP | G | A | Pts | PIM |
|---|---|---|---|---|---|---|---|---|---|---|---|---|
| 1928–29 | Victoria Cubs | PCHL | 35 | 1 | 3 | 4 | 96 | — | — | — | — | — |
| 1929–30 | Victoria Cubs | PCHL | 36 | 5 | 0 | 5 | 116 | — | — | — | — | — |
| 1930–31 | New York Rangers | NHL | 6 | 0 | 0 | 0 | 0 | — | — | — | — | — |
| 1930–31 | Detroit Olympics | IHL | 17 | 0 | 0 | 0 | 54 | — | — | — | — | — |
| 1930–31 | Tacoma Tigers | PCHL | 10 | 0 | 0 | 0 | 48 | — | — | — | — | — |
| 1932–33 | Edmonton Eskimos | WCHL | 28 | 7 | 6 | 13 | 94 | 8 | 3 | 0 | 3 | 18 |
| 1933–34 | Edmonton Eskimos | NWHL | 34 | 13 | 10 | 23 | 91 | 2 | 0 | 0 | 0 | 10 |
| 1934–35 | Chicago Black Hawks | NHL | 4 | 0 | 0 | 0 | 8 | — | — | — | — | — |
| 1934–35 | London Tecumsehs | IHL | 38 | 4 | 4 | 8 | 54 | 5 | 0 | 0 | 0 | 4 |
| 1934–35 | Windsor Bulldogs | IHL | 1 | 0 | 0 | 0 | 0 | — | — | — | — | — |
| 1935–36 | London Tecumsehs | IHL | 46 | 2 | 4 | 6 | 85 | 2 | 0 | 0 | 0 | 2 |
| 1936–37 | Spokane Clippers | PCHL | 39 | 4 | 2 | 6 | 86 | 6 | 0 | 0 | 0 | 17 |
| 1937–38 | Spokane Clippers | PCHL | 41 | 9 | 5 | 14 | 94 | — | — | — | — | — |
| 1938–39 | Spokane Clippers | PCHL | 48 | 9 | 13 | 22 | 70 | — | — | — | — | — |
| 1939–40 | Spokane Clippers | PCHL | 39 | 2 | 10 | 12 | 55 | — | — | — | — | — |
| PCHL totals | | | 248 | 7 | 6 | 13 | 94 | 8 | 3 | 0 | 3 | 18 |
| NHL totals | | | 10 | 0 | 0 | 0 | 8 | — | — | — | — | — |
