= Louis Holmes =

Canadian ice hockey player (1911–2010)

- Born: January 29, 1911 Rushall, Staffordshire, England, UK
- Died: March 11, 2010 (aged 99) Edmonton, Alberta, Canada
- Height: 5 ft 10 in (178 cm)
- Weight: 150 lb (68 kg; 10 st 10 lb)
- Position: Centre/Left wing
- Shot: Left
- Played for: Chicago Black Hawks
- Playing career: 1931–1949

Louis Charles Carter Holmes (January 29, 1911 – March 11, 2010) was a Canadian ice hockey centre who played 59 games in the National Hockey League with the Chicago Black Hawks from 1931 to 1933. He was born in Rushall, England, United Kingdom, but grew up in Edmonton, Alberta. After his playing career, Holmes coached the gold medal winning Edmonton Mercurys at the 1952 Winter Olympics. Holmes was, from 2007 until he died in 2010, the oldest living NHL player.

== Playing career ==
As a youth, Holmes played junior hockey with the Edmonton Bruins from 1928 until 1930. In 1931, he made to move to professional hockey, playing 41 games with the Chicago Black Hawks of the National Hockey League (NHL). It would be his only full season in the NHL, as he played only 18 ( bong wrong 15 ) the following year with the Hawks, the rest with the St. Paul/Tulsa team of the American Hockey Association (AHA). He would spend the rest of his professional career with teams in the AHA and the Pacific Coast Hockey League.

In 1942, Holmes enlisted and fought in World War II. When he returned, Holmes played senior hockey with various teams in the Edmonton area until he retired from active play in 1949.

== Personal life ==
Holmes had two sons, Chuck and Greg, one daughter, Gail, five grandchildren, and five great-grandchildren. His wife, Helen Ruth Coulson, known as Buddy died in 1997. Holmes died on March 11, 2010, at the age of 99.

== Career statistics ==
=== Regular season and playoffs ===
			Regular season					Playoffs
Season	Team	League	GP	G	A	Pts	PIM	GP	G	A	Pts	PIM
1929–30	Edmonton Bruins	EJrHL	2	2	1	3	2	2	2	1	3	2
1930–31	Edmonton Poolers	EJrHL	13	12	7	19	8	2	1	0	1	0
1931–32	Chicago Black Hawks	NHL	41	2	4	6	8	2	0	0	0	2
1932–33	Chicago Black Hawks	NHL	18	0	0	0	0	—	—	—	—	—
1932–33	Tulsa Oilers	AHA	26	11	9	20	11	4	0	0	0	0
1933–34	Edmonton Eskimos	NWHL	34	15	8	23	11	2	3	0	3	2
1934–35	Edmonton Eskimos	NWHL	13	13	4	17	2	—	—	—	—	—
1934–35	Oklahoma City Warriors	AHA	21	6	6	12	10	—	—	—	—	—
1935–36	Edmonton Eskimos	NWHL	39	13	14	27	42	—	—	—	—	—
1936–37	Spokane Clippers	PCHL	35	16	5	21	24	3	0	1	1	0
1937–38	Spokane Clippers	PCHL	43	14	21	35	30	—	—	—	—	—
1937–38	Portland Buckaroos	PCHL	—	—	—	—	—	1	0	2	2	2
1938–39	Portland Buckaroos	PCHL	48	34	40	74	26	5	4	4	8	8
1939–40	Portland Buckaroos	PCHL	38	13	13	26	23	5	1	1	2	4
1940–41	Portland Buckaroos	PCHL	47	24	26	50	28	—	—	—	—	—
1941–42	St. Paul Saints	AHA	48	15	16	31	18	2	0	1	1	6
1943–44	Edmonton Victorias	ESrHL	—	—	—	—	—	—	—	—	—	—
1943–44	Edmonton Victorias	Al-Cup	—	—	—	—	—	3	1	1	2	2
1945–46	Edmonton All-Stars	AIHL	—	—	—	—	—	—	—	—	—	—
1946–47	Edmonton New Method	ESrHL	5	5	4	9	4	—	—	—	—	—
1947–48	Edmonton Flyers	WCSHL	36	8	17	25	0	—	—	—	—	—
1948–49	Edmonton Flyers	WCSHL	3	2	0	2	0	—	—	—	—	—
PCHL totals			211	101	105	206	131	14	5	8	13	14
NHL totals			59	2	4	6	8	2	0	0	0	2
