= Pete Leswick =

Canadian ice hockey player

- Born: July 12, 1916; Saskatoon, Saskatchewan, Canada
- Died: June 20, 2005 (aged 88)
- Height: 5 ft 7 in (170 cm)
- Weight: 163 lb (74 kg; 11 st 9 lb)
- Position: Right wing
- Shot: Right
- Played for: New York Americans; Boston Bruins
- Playing career: 1936–1953

Peter John Leswick (July 12, 1916 – June 20, 2005) was a Canadian ice hockey right winger. In the 1936–37 season, he played one game for the New York Americans, and scored one goal. In the 1944–45 season, he played two games for the Boston Bruins. The rest of his career, which lasted from 1936 to 1952, was spent in various minor leagues. He was born in Saskatoon, Saskatchewan. Pete is the brother of Jack Leswick and Tony Leswick.

== Career statistics ==
=== Regular season and playoffs ===
			Regular season					Playoffs
Season	Team	League	GP	G	A	Pts	PIM	GP	G	A	Pts	PIM
1933–34	Saskatoon Wesleys	N-SJHL	4	0	2	2	0	9	3	0	3	6
1934–35	Saskatoon Nutana	N-SJHL	4	5	1	6	10	13	20	10	30	2
1935–36	Saskatoon Westleys	N-SSHL	5	4	1	5	0	—	—	—	—	—
1935–36	Saskatoon Westleys	M-Cup	—	—	—	—	—	11	17	10	27	2
1936–37	New York Americans	NHL	1	1	0	1	0	—	—	—	—	—
1936–37	New Haven Eagles	IAHL	19	4	3	7	0	—	—	—	—	—
1937–38	Seattle Seahawks	PCHL	42	20	9	29	22	4	0	0	0	0
1938–39	Kansas City Greyhounds	AHA	25	12	13	25	10	—	—	—	—	—
1938–39	Spokane Clippers	PCHL	20	7	3	10	9	—	—	—	—	—
1939–40	Kansas City Greyhounds	AHA	45	14	18	32	17	—	—	—	—	—
1940–41	Kansas City Americans	AHA	45	14	22	36	16	8	2	4	6	0
1941–42	Fort Worth Rangers	AHA	50	35	30	65	17	5	1	4	5	2
1942–43	Vancouver St. Regis	PCHL	3	6	1	7	2	5	3	2	5	4
1943–44	Portland Decleros	NNDHL	5	16	2	!8	8	—	—	—	—	—
1943–44	New Westminster Spitfires	PCHL	19	25	11	36	10	2	0	2	2	0
1943–44	New Westminster Spitfires	Al-Cup	—	—	—	—	—	18	15	21	36	12
1944–45	Boston Bruins	NHL	2	0	0	0	0	—	—	—	—	—
1944–45	Indianapolis Capitals	AHL	53	29	39	68	12	3	1	0	1	0
1944–45	Seattle Ironmen	PCHL	1	0	1	1	0	—	—	—	—	—
1945–46	Indianapolis Capitals	AHL	61	29	52	81	10	5	1	1	2	0
1946–47	Cleveland Barons	AHL	64	32	41	73	35	4	1	1	2	0
1947–48	Cleveland Barons	AHL	59	36	40	76	8	6	2	4	6	2
1948–49	Cleveland Barons	AHL	68	44	35	79	10	5	0	2	2	0
1949–50	Cleveland Barons	AHL	64	36	50	86	18	9	2	2	4	0
1950–51	Buffalo Bisons	AHL	11	6	5	11	0	—	—	—	—	—
1950–51	Seattle Totems	PCHL	49	14	21	35	6	—	—	—	—	—
1951–52	Halifax St. Mary's	MMHL	70	32	36	68	6	9	3	4	7	4
IAHL/AHL totals			399	216	265	481	93	32	7	10	17	2
NHL totals			3	1	0	1	0	—	—	—	—	—
