= Al Suomi =

American ice hockey player (1913–2014)

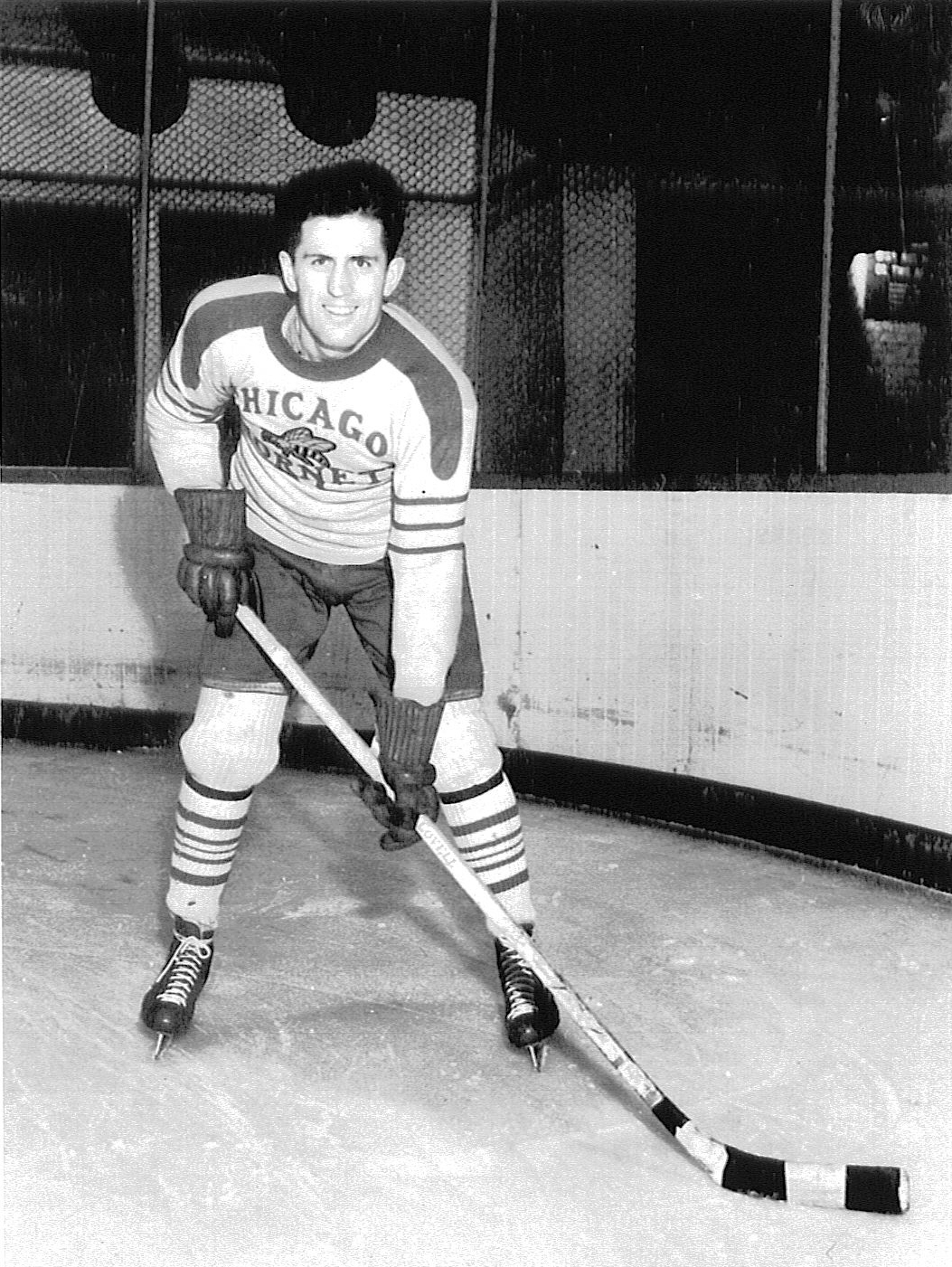
- Al Suomi, in 1937 with the Chicago Hornets of the Arena Hockey League.
- Born: October 29, 1913 Eveleth, Minnesota, U.S.
- Died: September 23, 2014 (aged 100) La Grange, Illinois, U.S.
- Height: 5 ft 10 in (178 cm)
- Weight: 170 lb (77 kg; 12 st 2 lb)
- Position: Left wing
- Shot: Left
- Played for: Chicago Black Hawks
- Playing career: 1936–1937

Albert William Suomi (October 29, 1913 – September 23, 2014) was an American ice hockey player, who played 5 games in the National Hockey League with the Chicago Black Hawks during the 1936–37 season. Although he did not aspire to play at a professional level, Suomi nevertheless spent his young life playing hockey and was eventually scouted while playing with friends. Suomi began his career playing for the Chicago Baby Ruth team in 1934, a marketing ploy started by the company that produced the candy of the same name. In 1936, he joined a minor league team in Detroit, Michigan and, based on his experiences with the Chicago Baby Ruth team, was deemed too professional to be eligible for the 1936 United States Olympic ice hockey team.

Suomi's time in the National Hockey League came as a result of another marketing ploy, this time on the part of the Chicago Black Hawks. Having benched all of his Canadian players, the manager declared his intent to field a team composed entirely of American players. Suomi was selected from among a pool of novice players to join the team but, after five games, the gimmick was disbanded and replaced with professionals. Retiring from hockey in 1940, he took on a series of small jobs before opening his own hardware store in Chicago. As of 2007, Suomi was the last surviving member of the 1936–37 all-American Chicago Black Hawks team and, following the 2010 death of Louis Holmes, the oldest living former NHL player. He is also believed to be the first former NHL player to reach the age of 100.

== Early life ==
Suomi was born to a working-class family in Eveleth, Minnesota on October 29, 1913. His father was an immigrant from Finland, and shares the name Suomi (Finnish for 'Finland'). Although Suomi never had any serious aspirations to play professional ice hockey, he nevertheless began practicing at local rinks at an early age, focusing on his talents as a left winger. As a teenager, he played at both the high school and college level. His brother, John Suomi, played minor league hockey in Virginia. In 1934, during the Great Depression, he and two of his friends were approached by scout Jack Manley, who offered them a chance to play professional hockey in Chicago. With only one hour to catch the bus to Minneapolis, Minnesota, Suomi decided that he had nothing to lose and took his belongings in a cardboard box with him to the bus station.

== Hockey career ==
For the 1934–35 season, Suomi was a member of the Chicago Baby Ruth team of the United States Amateur Hockey Association league, participating in two playoff games and scoring a total of two goals. The team was designed as a marketing gimmick for the Curtis Candy Company and played before all of the Chicago Black Hawk games to increase their attendance. While Suomi made the team, his two friends were rejected and they returned to Minnesota. For the next season, from 1935 to 1936, he was called to Michigan, and joined the Detroit Tool Shop of the Michigan-Ontario Hockey League. He was offered an opportunity to try out for the 1936 Olympic ice hockey team for the United States, but his past association led him to be rejected for being too professional. He played 17 regular season games for the Detroit Tool Shop, scoring eight goals and five assists for a total of 13 points. During the regular season, he had six penalty minutes. In addition, he played in four playoff games, scoring one assist.

In 1936 Suomi, along with other MOHL players, took jobs in Denver, Colorado. Unlike the others, however, he received an invitation to try out for the Chicago Black Hawks, which he accepted despite threats of a lawsuit from his employer. In another marketing ploy, Black Hawk owner Frederic McLaughlin had benched all the Canadian players on his team and declared his intentions to field a team that consisted entirely of individuals born in the United States. The 1936–37 was Suomi's sole season in the National Hockey League. He played five games with the Black Hawks, but scored no points, and, after four wins and one loss, Suomi and the other Americans were let go and replaced with the professionals.

According to some statistics, Suomi spent the remainder of the 1936–37 season with the Michigan-Ontario Hockey League's Detroit Pontiacs. Throughout 20 games, he scored only two points but spent 14 minutes in the penalty box. In a 2002 interview, however, he denied having ever played for the team. His last season in hockey was with the Chicago Hornets of the Arena Hockey League.

== Later life ==
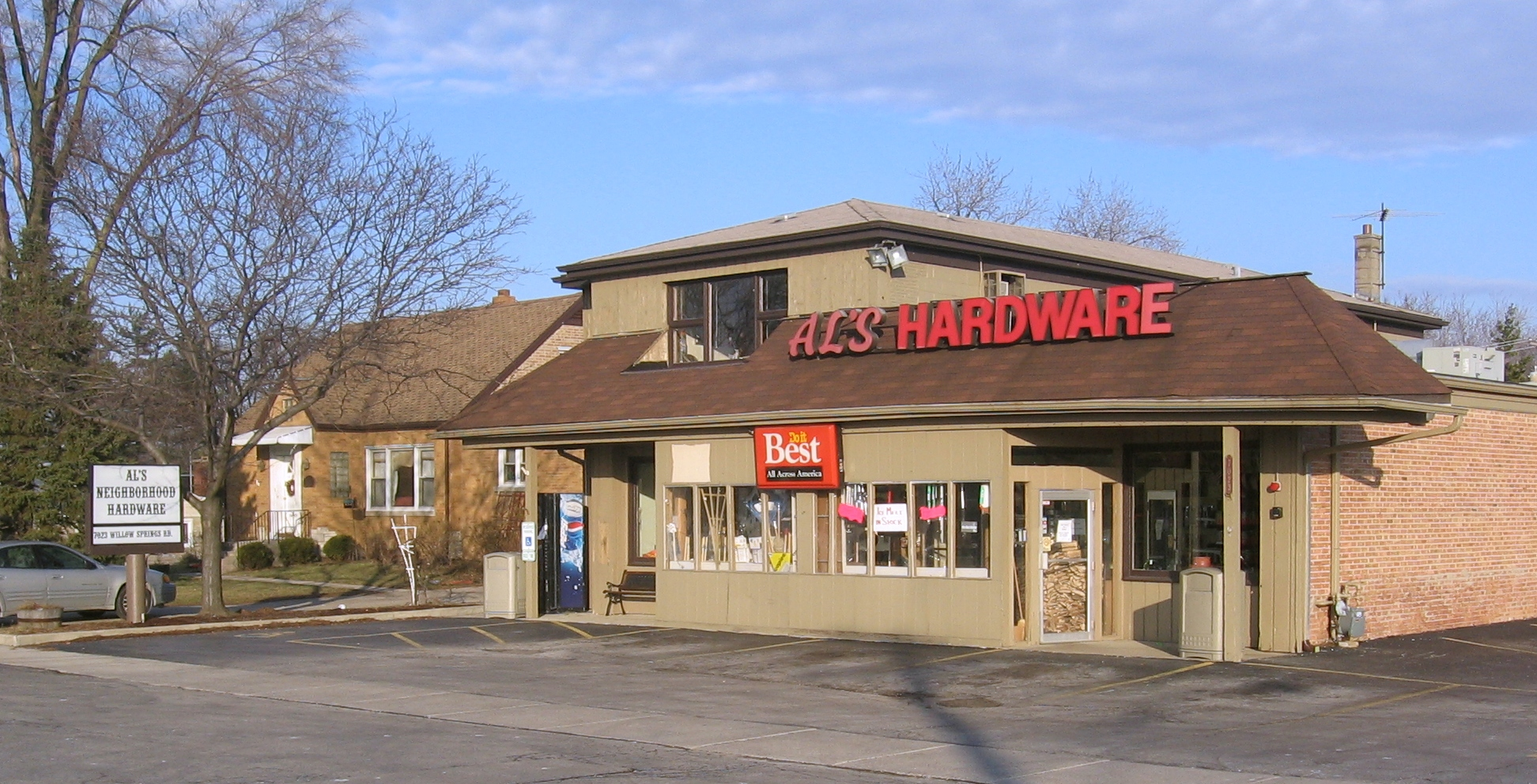
Al's hardware store, in Countryside, Illinois.

After the ArHL folded in 1940, Suomi began refereeing, but soon gave it up. He then worked as a welder and electrician and was not called to serve in World War II. He later founded "Al's Hardware", eventually to be run by his children, in Countryside, Illinois. As of 2007, he was the last surviving member of the team. Following the death of Louis Holmes in March 2010, he became the oldest living former NHL player, a title that he held until his death on September 23, 2014, a month before his 101st birthday.

== Career statistics ==
=== Regular season and playoffs ===
			Regular season					Playoffs
Season	Team	League	GP	G	A	Pts	PIM	GP	G	A	Pts	PIM
1931–32	Eveleth-Gilbert High School	HS-MN	—	—	—	—	—	—	—	—	—	—
1934–35	Chicago Baby Ruth	USAHA	—	—	—	—	—	2	2	0	2	—
1935–36	Detroit Tool Shop	MOHL	17	8	5	13	6	4	0	1	1	0
1936–37	Chicago Black Hawks	NHL	5	0	0	0	0	—	—	—	—	—
1936–37	Detroit Pontiacs	MOHL	20	2	0	2	14	—	—	—	—	—
NHL totals			5	0	0	0	0	—	—	—	—	—

== See also ==
- List of centenarians (sportspeople)
