= Ron Moffat =

American ice hockey player (1905–1960)

- Born: August 21, 1905 West Hope, North Dakota, United States
- Died: August 19, 1960 (aged 54)
- Height: 5 ft 11 in (180 cm)
- Weight: 180 lb (82 kg; 12 st 12 lb)
- Position: Left wing
- Shot: Left
- Played for: Detroit Red Wings; Saskatoon Crescents
- Playing career: 1925–1940

Ronald Robert Moffatt (August 21, 1905 – August 19, 1960) was an American-born Canadian professional ice hockey player who played 37 games in the National Hockey League. He played for the Detroit Red Wings. Moffatt was born in Westhope, North Dakota, but grew up in Perdue, Saskatchewan.

His hockey career began in the Western Canada Hockey League in 1925-26 with the Saskatoon Crescents and moved to the Saskatoon Sheiks of the Prairie Hockey League. In 1928 he signed on with the Tulsa Oilers and remained for 4 years until 1932 when the Detroit Red Wings signed him as a free agent.

== Career statistics ==
=== Regular season and playoffs ===
			Regular season					Playoffs
Season	Team	League	GP	G	A	Pts	PIM	GP	G	A	Pts	PIM
1925–26	Saskatoon Crescents	WHL	8	0	0	0	2	—	—	—	—	—
1926–27	Saskatoon Sheiks	PHL	29	12	5	17	6	4	0	0	0	2
1927–28	Saskatoon Sheikhs	PHL	28	12	11	23	18	—	—	—	—	—
1928–29	Tulsa Oilers	AHA	18	1	2	3	8	—	—	—	—	—
1929–30	Tulsa Oilers	AHA	48	14	5	19	45	9	2	0	2	4
1930–31	Tulsa Oilers	AHA	47	17	11	28	22	4	1	0	1	12
1931–32	Tulsa Oilers	AHA	41	11	1	12	34	—	—	—	—	—
1932–33	Detroit Red Wings	NHL	24	1	1	2	6	4	0	0	0	0
1932–33	Detroit Olympics	IHL	22	7	2	9	16	—	—	—	—	—
1933–34	Detroit Red Wings	NHL	5	0	0	0	2	3	0	0	0	0
1933–34	Detroit Olympics	IHL	38	17	10	27	25	6	5	2	7	4
1934–35	Detroit Red Wings	NHL	8	0	0	0	0	—	—	—	—	—
1934–35	Detroit Olympics	IHL	41	13	16	29	41	5	3	1	4	5
1934–35	Windsor Bulldogs	IHL	1	0	0	0	4	—	—	—	—	—
1935–36	Windsor Bulldogs	IHL	47	18	12	30	34	8	2	3	5	4
1936–37	Spokane Clippers	PCHL	40	15	5	20	36	6	2	0	2	0
1937–38	Seattle Seahawks	PCHL	42	12	20	32	32	4	0	0	0	2
1938–39	Seattle Seahawks	PCHL	22	6	2	8	2	—	—	—	—	—
1938–39	Portland Buckaroos	PCHL	—	—	—	—	—	—	—	—	—	—
1938–39	Spokane Clippers	PCHL	43	15	12	27	16	—	—	—	—	—
1939–40	Seattle Seahawks	PCHL	6	0	0	0	0	—	—	—	—	—
AHA totals			154	43	19	62	109	13	3	0	3	16
NHL totals			37	1	1	2	8	7	0	0	0	0
