= Walter Harnott =

Canadian ice hockey player

- Born: September 24, 1909; Montreal, Quebec, Canada
- Died: January 8, 1977 (aged 67)
- Height: 5 ft 10 in (178 cm)
- Weight: 175 lb (79 kg; 12 st 7 lb)
- Position: Left wing
- Shot: Left
- Played for: Boston Bruins
- Playing career: 1931–1945

Walter Herbert "Happy" Harnott (September 24, 1909 in Montreal, Quebec — January 8, 1977) was a Canadian professional ice hockey player who played six games in the National Hockey League during the 1933–34 season, with the Boston Bruins. The rest of his career, which lasted from 1931 to 1945, was spent in various minor leagues.

== Career statistics ==
=== Regular season and playoffs ===
			Regular season					Playoffs
Season	Team	League	GP	G	A	Pts	PIM	GP	G	A	Pts	PIM
1928–29	Montreal Bell Telephone	MTRHL	2	1	1	2	2	—	—	—	—	—
1929–30	Montreal Columbus Club	MCHL	10	2	0	2	2	—	—	—	—	—
1930–31	Montreal Columbus Club	MCHL	9	3	0	3	6	2	0	0	0	6
1931–32	Boston Cubs	Can-Am	18	2	1	3	6	5	1	0	1	6
1931–32	Montreal AAA	MCHL	8	4	1	5	10	—	—	—	—	—
1932–33	Boston Cubs	Can-Am	23	4	1	5	10	—	—	—	—	—
1933–34	Boston Bruins	NHL	6	0	0	0	2	—	—	—	—	—
1933–34	Boston Cubs	Can-Am	38	10	5	15	16	3	0	1	1	0
1934–35	Syracuse Stars	IHL	5	0	1	1	0	—	—	—	—	—
1934–35	Boston Cubs	Can-Am	40	11	15	26	20	3	1	0	1	0
1935–36	Boston Cubs	Can-Am	22	3	4	7	14	—	—	—	—	—
1935–36	Calgary Tigers	NWHL	14	4	3	7	0	—	—	—	—	—
1936–37	St. Louis Flyers	AHA	7	1	0	1	2	—	—	—	—	—
1937–38	St. Paul Saints	AHA	34	12	15	27	4	—	—	—	—	—
1937–38	St. Louis Flyers	AHA	8	0	1	1	0	—	—	—	—	—
1938–39	St. Louis Flyers	AHA	47	16	25	41	31	7	3	4	7	2
1939–40	St. Louis Flyers	AHA	48	24	29	53	18	5	1	2	3	5
1939–40	Omaha Knights	AHA	—	—	—	—	—	3	1	1	2	0
1940–41	St. Louis Flyers	AHA	48	13	24	37	10	9	0	3	3	2
1941–42	St. Louis Flyers	AHA	42	7	10	17	8	3	0	0	0	2
1942–43	Montreal Royals	QSHL	9	0	2	2	2	—	—	—	—	—
1942–43	Montreal RCAF	MCHL	7	2	3	5	2	2	4	1	5	2
1943–44	Montreal RCAF	MNDHL	4	0	0	0	0	2	0	0	0	0
1944–45	Montreal RCAF	MCHL	12	6	18	24	0	6	1	3	4	6
1944–45	Valleyfield Braves	QPHL	—	—	—	—	—	1	0	0	0	0
AHA totals			234	73	104	177	73	27	5	10	15	11
NHL totals			6	0	0	0	0	—	—	—	—	—
