= Max Bennett =

Max Bennett may refer to:

- Max Bennett (actor) (born 1984), English actor
- Max Bennett (ice hockey) (1912–1972), Canadian ice hockey player
- Max Bennett (musician) (1928–2018), American bassist
- Max Bennett (scientist) (born 1939), Australian neuroscientist
