= Mickey O'Leary =

Canadian ice hockey player

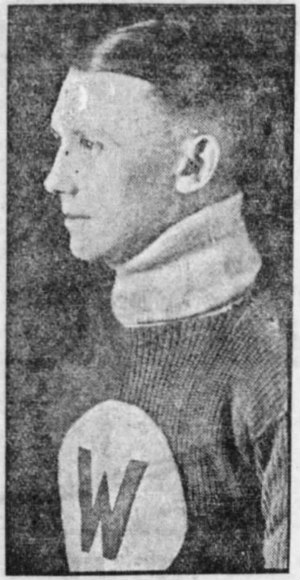
- O'Leary in 1919–20 with the Calgary Wanderers
- Born: February 5, 1892 Ottawa, Ontario, Canada
- Died: September 12, 1954 (aged 62) Ottawa, Ontario, Canada
- Position: Centre
- Played for: Calgary Wanderers; Toronto Blueshirts; Halifax Socials; Victoria Aristocrats
- Playing career: 1909–1921

Michael Patrick "Mike" O'Leary (February 5, 1892 – September 12, 1954) was a Canadian professional ice hockey player. He played with the Toronto Blueshirts of the National Hockey Association, the Halifax Socials of the Maritime Professional Hockey Association, and the Victoria Aristocrats of the Pacific Coast Hockey Association. He died after an illness at his Ottawa home in 1954.

During the 1919–20 season O'Leary played centre for the Calgary Wanderers of the Big-4 League in Alberta.

Mickey O'Leary's older brother Eddie was a longtime referee in the National Hockey League.
