= Wilf Talbot =

Canadian ice hockey player

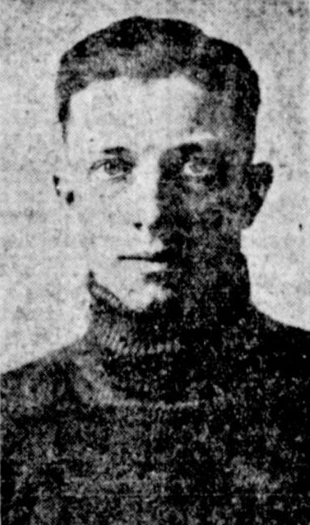
- Talbot with the Edmonton Hustlers in 1919–20.
- Born: June 3, 1897; Montreal, Quebec, Canada
- Died: November 4, 1946 (aged 49); Victoria, British Columbia, Canada
- Position: Goaltender
- Played for: Edmonton Eskimos
- Playing career: 1919–1924

Wilfred Gladstone "Wilf" Talbot (June 3, 1897 – November 4, 1946) was a Canadian professional ice hockey goaltender. He played with the Edmonton Eskimos of the Western Canada Hockey League in the 1921–22 season. He also played two seasons in the Big-4 League with the Edmonton Hustlers and the Edmonton Dominions. He died in 1946 at Victoria, British Columbia of an accidental gunshot wound to the chest. He was 49.

Wilf Talbot's younger brother Peter Thomas "Pete" Talbot (born January 31, 1899) was also an ice hockey goaltender in Edmonton, between 1914 and 1917, but died in World War I on May 23, 1918, at the age of 19.
