= Vic Ripley =

Canadian ice hockey player

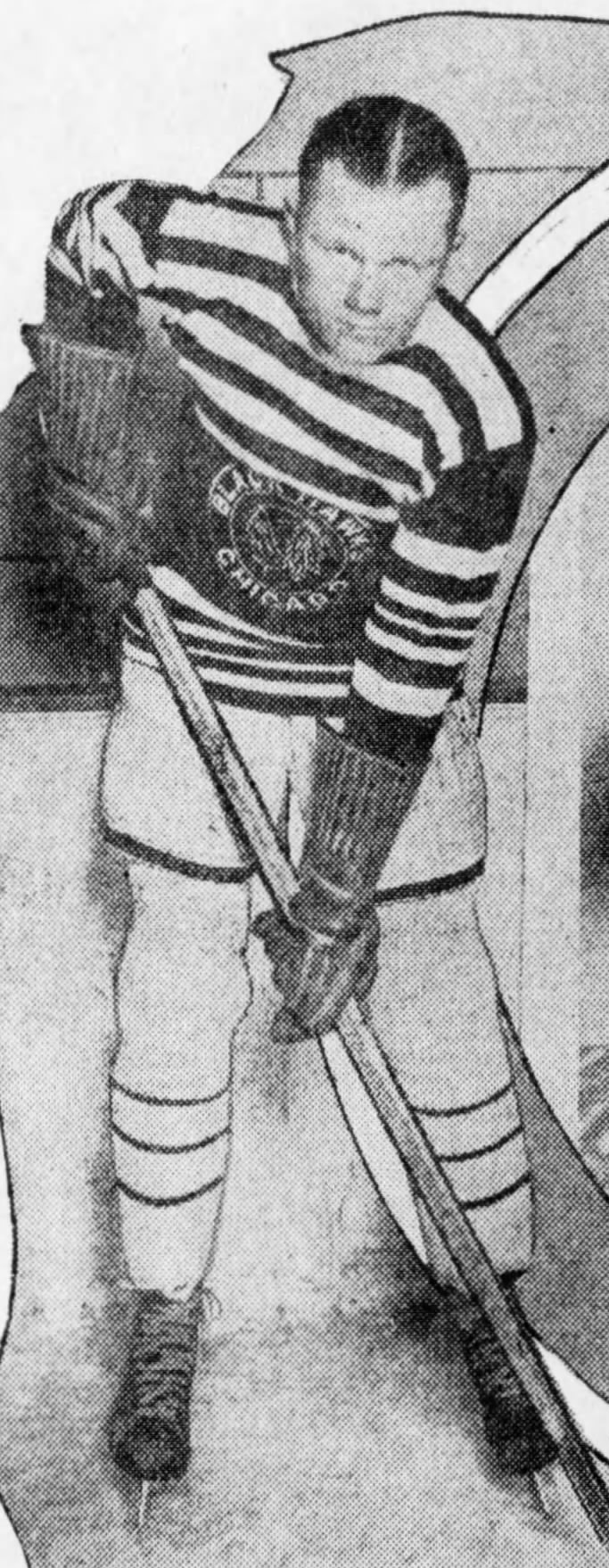
- Born: May 30, 1906 Rideau Lakes, Ontario, Canada
- Died: March 26, 1962 (aged 55) Las Vegas Valley, Nevada, U.S.
- Height: 5 ft 8 in (173 cm)
- Weight: 170 lb (77 kg; 12 st 2 lb)
- Position: Left wing
- Shot: Left
- Played for: Chicago Black Hawks; Boston Bruins; New York Rangers; St. Louis Eagles
- Playing career: 1925–1944

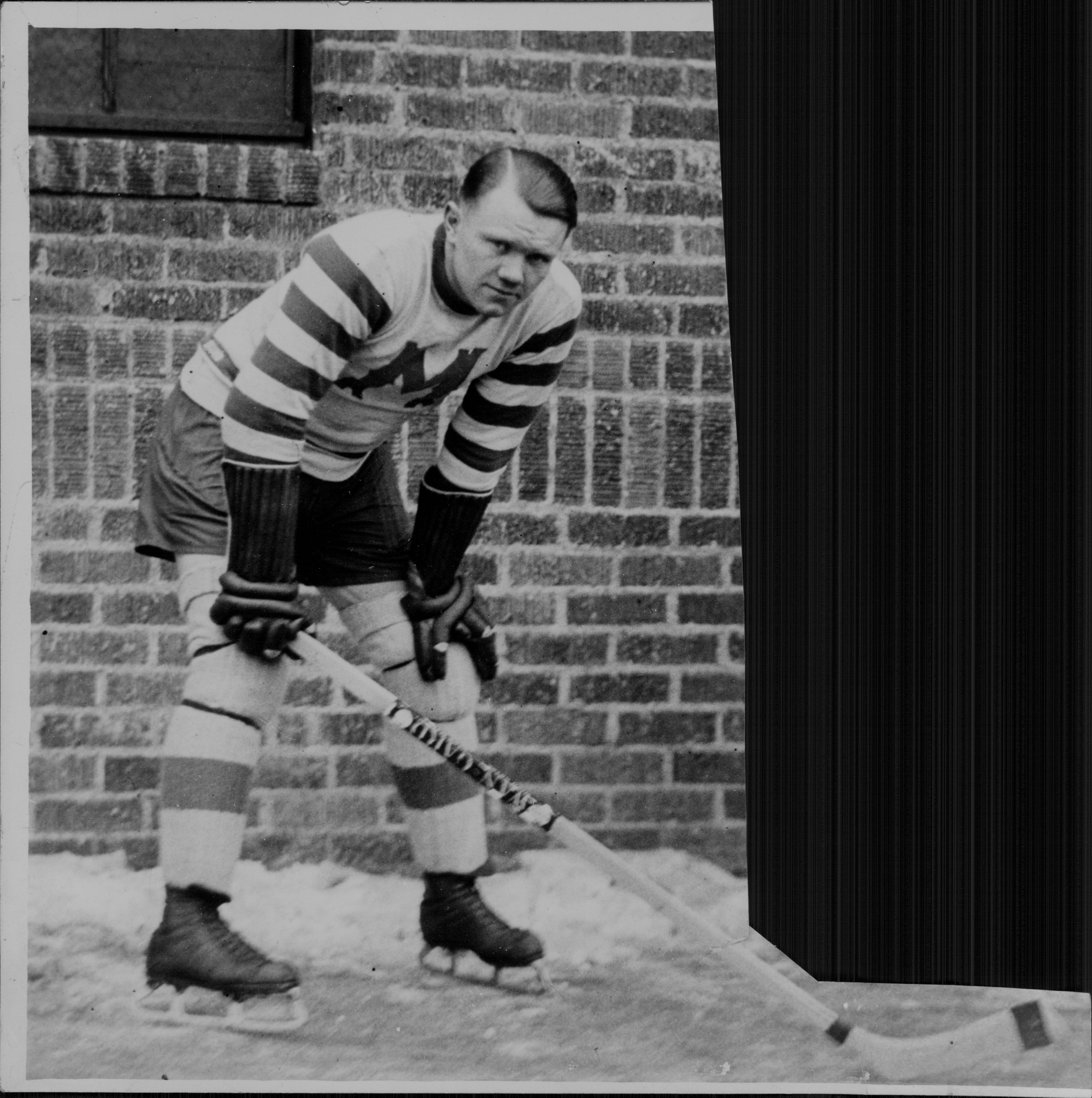
Ripley with the Minneapolis Millers in 1926

Victor Merrick Ripley (May 30, 1906 – March 26, 1962) was a Canadian hockey winger who played seven seasons in the National Hockey League for the Chicago Black Hawks, Boston Bruins, New York Rangers, and St. Louis Eagles. He also played several years in various minor leagues from 1925 to 1944. Ripley was later a golf pro at the Desert Inn in Paradise, Nevada. He was born in Elgin, Ontario. Ripley died of a heart attack on March 26, 1962.

Ripley scored the 1,000th regular-season goal in Boston Bruins' history. It was Boston's lone goal in a 4–1 loss to the Toronto Maple Leafs at Boston Garden on December 12, 1933. It was the same game in which Toronto's Ace Bailey suffered a career-ending head injury.

== Career statistics ==
=== Regular season and playoffs ===
| | | | Regular season | | | | | Playoffs |
| Season | Team | League | GP | G | A | Pts | PIM | GP | G | A | Pts | PIM |
|---|---|---|---|---|---|---|---|---|---|---|---|---|
| 1922–23 | Calgary Canadians | CCJHL | 13 | 15 | 8 | 23 | — | — | — | — | — | — |
| 1922–23 | Calgary Canadians | Mem-Cup | — | — | — | — | — | 4 | 3 | 0 | 3 | 4 |
| 1923–24 | Calgary Canadians | CCJHL | — | — | — | — | — | — | — | — | — | — |
| 1923–24 | Calgary Canadians | Mem-Cup | — | — | — | — | — | 7 | 10 | 9 | 19 | 6 |
| 1924–25 | Calgary Canadians | CCJHL | — | — | — | — | — | — | — | — | — | — |
| 1924–25 | Calgary Canadians | Mem-Cup | — | — | — | — | — | 2 | 4 | 0 | 4 | 2 |
| 1925–26 | Minneapolis Millers | CHL | 35 | 6 | 2 | 8 | 16 | 3 | 1 | 0 | 1 | 2 |
| 1926–27 | Minneapolis Millers | AHA | 34 | 7 | 1 | 8 | 30 | 6 | 0 | 0 | 0 | 2 |
| 1927–28 | Kitchener Millionaires | Can-Pro | 39 | 26 | 14 | 40 | 69 | 5 | 1 | 1 | 2 | 12 |
| 1928–29 | Chicago Black Hawks | NHL | 34 | 11 | 2 | 13 | 31 | — | — | — | — | — |
| 1929–30 | Chicago Black Hawks | NHL | 40 | 8 | 8 | 16 | 33 | 2 | 0 | 0 | 0 | 2 |
| 1930–31 | Chicago Black Hawks | NHL | 37 | 8 | 4 | 12 | 9 | 9 | 2 | 1 | 3 | 4 |
| 1931–32 | Chicago Black Hawks | NHL | 46 | 12 | 6 | 18 | 47 | 2 | 0 | 0 | 0 | 0 |
| 1932–33 | Chicago Black Hawks | NHL | 15 | 2 | 4 | 6 | 6 | — | — | — | — | — |
| 1932–33 | Boston Bruins | NHL | 23 | 2 | 5 | 7 | 21 | 5 | 1 | 0 | 1 | 0 |
| 1933–34 | Boston Bruins | NHL | 14 | 2 | 1 | 3 | 6 | — | — | — | — | — |
| 1933–34 | New York Rangers | NHL | 34 | 5 | 12 | 17 | 10 | 2 | 1 | 0 | 1 | 4 |
| 1934–35 | New York Rangers | NHL | 4 | 0 | 2 | 2 | 0 | — | — | — | — | — |
| 1934–35 | St. Louis Eagles | NHL | 31 | 1 | 5 | 6 | 10 | — | — | — | — | — |
| 1935–36 | Cleveland Falcons | IHL | 48 | 14 | 32 | 46 | 51 | 2 | 0 | 0 | 0 | 0 |
| 1936–37 | Cleveland Barons | IAHL | 13 | 0 | 2 | 2 | 6 | — | — | — | — | — |
| 1936–37 | New Haven Eagles | IAHL | 13 | 0 | 1 | 1 | 4 | — | — | — | — | — |
| 1937–38 | Spokane Clippers | PCHL | 42 | 19 | 16 | 35 | 19 | — | — | — | — | — |
| 1938–39 | Spokane Clippers | PCHL | 44 | 20 | 22 | 42 | 22 | — | — | — | — | — |
| 1939–40 | Seattle Seahawks | PCHL | 36 | 11 | 15 | 26 | 24 | — | — | — | — | — |
| 1940–41 | Portland Buckaroos | PCHL | 47 | 11 | 20 | 31 | 37 | — | — | — | — | — |
| 1943–44 | Portland Oilers | NNDHL | 15 | 13 | 8 | 21 | 10 | — | — | — | — | — |
| 1943–44 | Portland Oilers | NNDHL | 1 | 1 | 1 | 2 | 4 | 4 | 1 | 1 | 2 | 4 |
| NHL totals | | | 278 | 51 | 49 | 100 | 173 | 20 | 4 | 1 | 5 | 10 |
