= Frank Peters (ice hockey) =

American ice hockey player

- Born: June 5, 1902 Rouses Point, New York, U.S.
- Died: July 17, 1973 (aged 71) Boston, Massachusetts, U.S.
- Height: 5 ft 11 in (180 cm)
- Weight: 180 lb (82 kg; 12 st 12 lb)
- Position: Defense
- Shot: Right
- Played for: New York Rangers
- Playing career: 1927–1934

Hubert John Francis Peters (June 5, 1902 – July 17, 1973), nicknamed Frosty Peters, was an American professional ice hockey player. He played 43 games in the National Hockey League with the New York Rangers during the 1930–31 season. The rest of his career, which lasted from 1923 to 1934, was spent in the minor leagues. Peters was born in Rouses Point, New York, the son of Hubert Peters, a printer. Peters played the second most games in the NHL without registering a point, at 43 behind Gord Strate, who played in 61.

== Career statistics ==
=== Regular season and playoffs ===
			Regular season					Playoffs
Season	Team	League	GP	G	A	Pts	PIM	GP	G	A	Pts	PIM
1922–23	Edmonton Yeomen	EJrHL	—	—	—	—	—	—	—	—	—	—
1923–24	Crowsnest Pass Lions	ASHL	—	—	—	—	—	—	—	—	—	—
1924–25	Boston Athletic Association	USAHA	7	2	0	2	—	—	—	—	—	—
1925–26	Eveleth Rangers	CHL	30	0	1	1	7	—	—	—	—	—
1926–27	Eveleth Rangers	CHL	—	—	—	—	—	—	—	—	—	—
1927–28	Windsor Hornets	Can-Pro	12	0	0	0	10	—	—	—	—	—
1927–28	Philadelphia Arrows	Can-Am	18	3	0	3	22	—	—	—	—	—
1928–29	Philadelphia Arrows	Can-Am	38	4	3	7	93	—	—	—	—	—
1929–30	Philadelphia Arrows	Can-Am	39	10	5	15	135	—	—	—	—	—
1930–31	New York Rangers	NHL	43	0	0	0	59	4	0	0	0	2
1931–32	Detroit Olympics	IHL	48	1	11	12	75	—	—	—	—	—
1932–33	Philadelphia Arrows	Can-Am	46	3	1	4	103	—	—	—	—	—
1933–34	Philadelphia Arrows	Can-Am	40	2	2	4	61	—	—	—	—	—
Can-Am totals			181	22	11	33	414	7	0	0	0	4
NHL totals			43	0	0	0	59	4	0	0	0	2
