= Big-4 League =

Senior ice hockey league

- Sport: Ice hockey
- Founded: 1919
- Folded: 1921
- Country: Canada
- Last champion: Calgary Tigers
- Most titles: Calgary Tigers (1); Edmonton Eskimos (1)

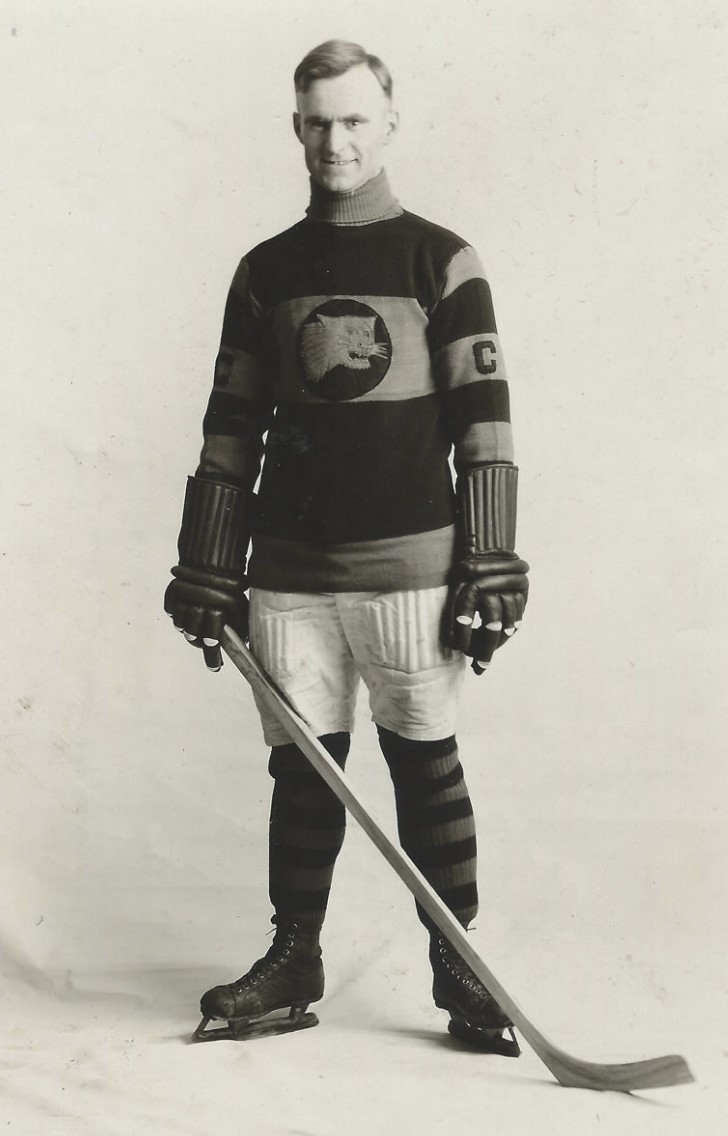
Barney Stanley was one of the former PCHA stars lured to Alberta by the Big-4

The Big-4 League was a top-level senior ice hockey league that operated in Calgary and Edmonton, Alberta, Canada, for two seasons between 1919 and 1921. Created with the intention of competing for the Allan Cup senior-amateur championship, the league's existence was marred by accusations that its teams were secretly paying their players. The Big-4 lost its amateur status after its first season and operated as an independent league until further accusations of the use of ineligible players led to its collapse in 1921. Two of its teams, the Calgary Tigers and Edmonton Eskimos went on to form the professional Western Canada Hockey League.

== Founding ==
By 1919, the Stanley Cup was no longer awarded to the top amateur team in Canada, reserved instead for the professional National and Pacific Coast leagues. The Allan Cup had been established as the new amateur championship in its place. The Big-4 was established in 1919 with the intention of bringing the Allan Cup to Alberta.

== Teams ==
- Edmonton Eskimos: 1919–1921
- Calgary Wanderers: 1919–20
- Edmonton Hustlers: 1919–20
- Calgary Columbus Club: 1919–20
- Calgary Tigers: 1920–21
- Calgary Canadians: 1920–21
- Edmonton Dominions: 1920–21

== 1919–20 season ==
Two teams represented Calgary in the Big-4: The Columbus and the Wanderers, while two represented Edmonton: the Dominions and Eskimos. Led by Duke Keats, who scored 32 points in 12 games, the Eskimos finished at the top of the league standings. They faced the second place Wanderers in a home-and-home, total goal series for the championship. After a 6–1 victory in Edmonton, the Eskimos defeated the Wanderers 2–1 in the second game in Calgary to win the title by an 8–2 score.

=== Standings ===
Team	GP	W	L	T	GF	GA	P
Edmonton Eskimos	12	8	4	0	62	31	16
Calgary Wanderers	12	8	4	0	40	36	16
Edmonton Hustlers	12	5	7	0	36	46	10
Calgary Columbus	12	3	9	0	38	63	6

== 1920 off-season ==
The Columbus and Wanderers both withdrew from the league after the first season and were replaced by the Canadians and Tigers as Calgary's representatives. Additionally, the league chose to adopt the six-man rules for the 1920–21 season, eliminating the rover position, and sought Canadian Amateur Hockey Association (CAHA) sanction so as to be eligible for Allan Cup competition. The league attempted to become the Big-5 as president Allan McCaw attempted to add a team from Saskatchewan but was unsuccessful.

Following the defection of some players to the Big-4, PCHA president Frank Patrick wrote a letter to the CAHA charging that the Big-4 was operating as a semi-professional league, paying many of its players in secret. He asked that the CAHA declare the Big-4 as a professional circuit and disqualify it from competing for the Allan Cup. Alberta Amateur Hockey Association (AAHA) president Frank Drayton responded to the charges by stating that the Alberta league was one of few in the country operating as true amateurs, and attacked other associations, arguing that both Saskatchewan and Manitoba had submitted illegally professional teams to the Allan Cup tournament.

Although it was facing growing criticism over the accusations, the Big-4 ignored requests to offer evidence in its defence, arguing it had no right to compel its players to testify. The CAHA sided with Patrick and declared the Big-4 professional. The league, while publicly continuing to defend itself against the charges, chose not to appeal and operated as an independent league in 1920–21.

== 1920–21 season ==
As the season's end approached, the Tigers were in first place while the Canadians trailed the Eskimos for second place. The Canadians filed a protest against the Eskimos, alleging that goaltender Bill Tobin had not lived in Alberta long enough to qualify for amateur status in the province, and thus was an illegal player. A three-man panel was formed to rule on Tobin's status, and sided with the Edmonton club. The Tigers, upset that the panel had replaced a neutral panelist with one from Edmonton shortly before the protest was heard, refused to accept the decision and announced that it would not face the Eskimos for the league championship. The Calgary teams expanded their protests, arguing that two other players were also ineligible, and recommended the matter be brought before a judge. When the Edmonton teams refused, the league collapsed on February 24, 1921.

Though the league had collapsed, the Tigers and Eskimos, without Tobin, finally agreed to hold an informal intercity championship. The Tigers won the first game in Calgary, 2–0, but lost the second to the Eskimos 2–1 at Edmonton. The Calgary club was declared the winner on the strength of a 3–2 aggregate score.

=== Standings ===
Lag	GP	W	L	T	GF	GA	P
Calgary Tigers	15	10	4	1	62	46	21
Edmonton Eskimos	15	9	6	0	57	43	18
Calgary Canadians	16	8	7	1	47	47	17
Edmonton Dominions	16	2	12	2	32	62	6

Playoffs: Calgary Tigers vs Edmonton Eskimos 3-2 (2-0, 1-2)

== Post-collapse ==
Interest in professional hockey grew in wake of the Big-4 controversy. Although many doubted whether the then relatively small prairie cities could compete at the major professional level, talks nevertheless begun to create a prairie league that would compete with the NHL and PCHA. The former Big-4 teams openly declared their professionalism and joined with two teams from Saskatchewan to create the Western Canada Hockey League in the summer of 1921. The two Calgary teams subsequently chose to merge into one team, continuing on under the Tigers name, and joined with the Edmonton Eskimos, Regina Capitals and Saskatoon Sheiks.

The WCHL would be renamed the Western Hockey League for its fifth and final 1925–26 season, before disbanding and seeing some of its teams forming the new Prairie Hockey League, which disbanded after two seasons.

== Gallery ==
Some of the players who played in the Big-4 League:

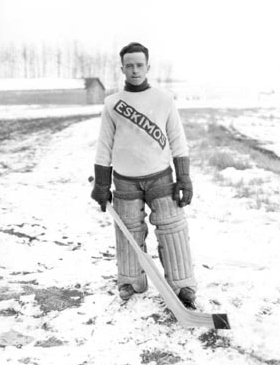
Bill Tobin with the Edmonton Eskimos

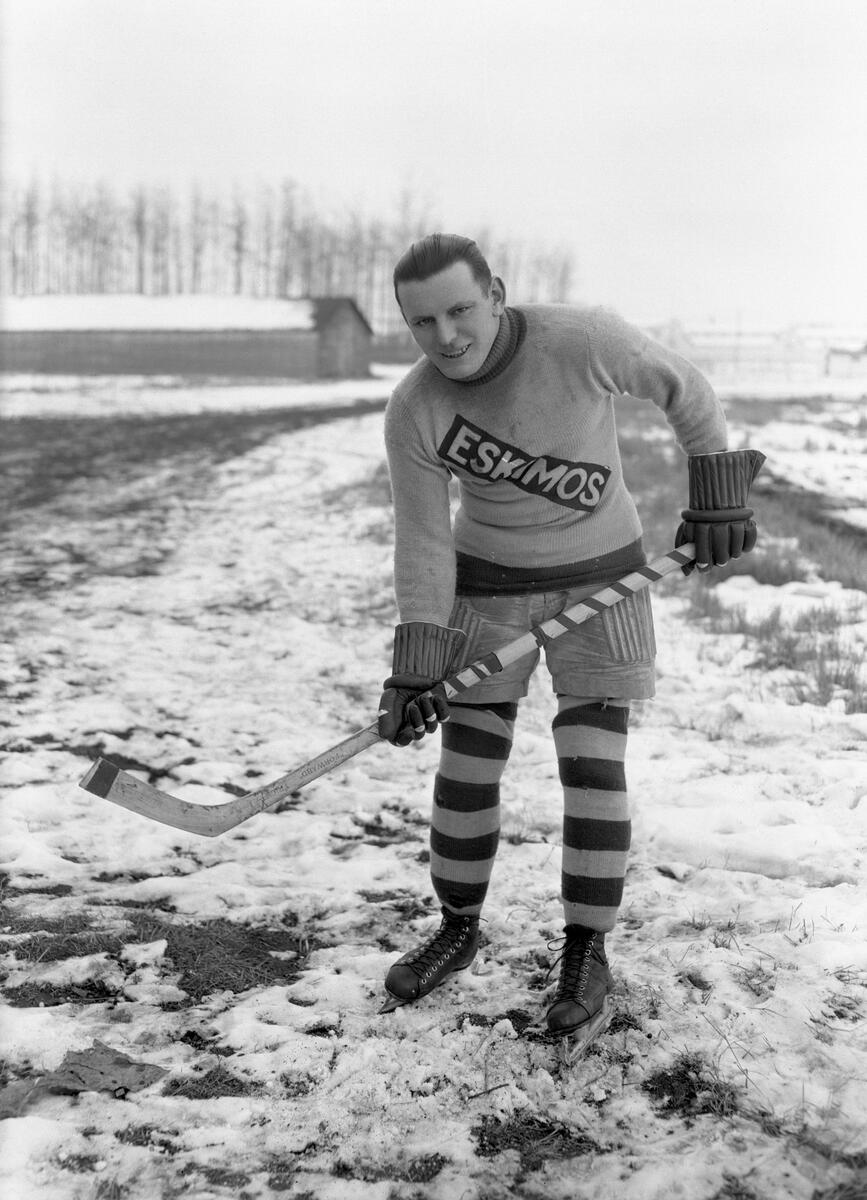
Duke Keats with the Edmonton Eskimos

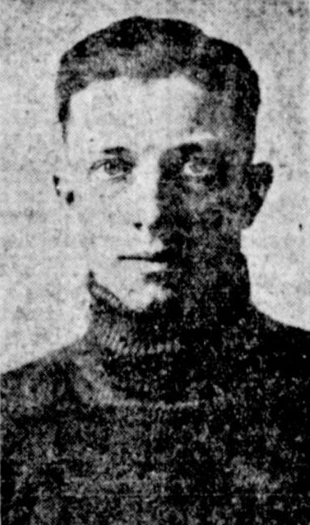
Wilf Talbot with the Edmonton Hustlers

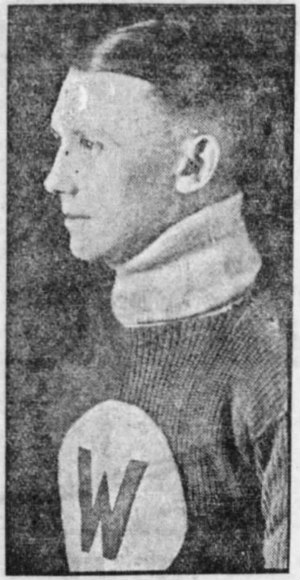
Mickey O'Leary with the Calgary Wanderers

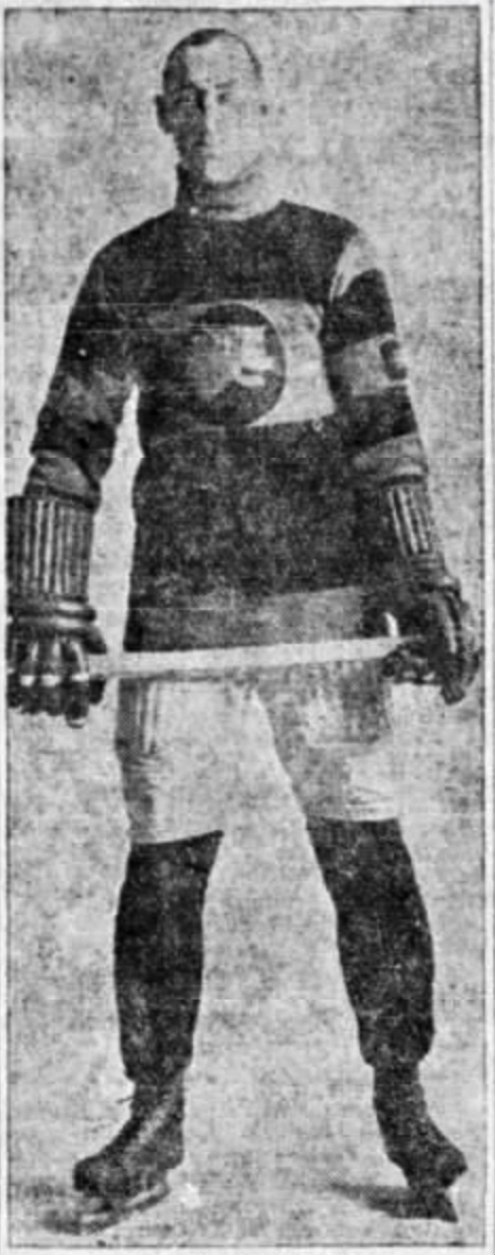
Herb Gardiner with the Calgary Tigers
