= Manitoba Hockey League =

The Manitoba Hockey League was a senior men's ice hockey league operating in or around the 1920s in Manitoba, Canada, under the auspices of the Manitoba Amateur Hockey Association, now known as Hockey Manitoba.

The name Manitoba Hockey League was also applied to the Manitoba Hockey Association senior league of 1892–1904, 1908–1923.
