= Western Canada Hockey League (1932–33) =

The Western Canada Hockey League was an ice hockey minor league with teams from western Canada that existed for one hockey season, 1932 to 1933. The next year, with the addition of two American franchises along with another Canadian one, the league was reformed as the North West Hockey League.

== Teams ==
- Calgary Tigers (won championship)
- Edmonton Eskimos
- Regina Capitals/Vancouver Maroons
- Saskatoon Crescents

== Final standings ==
	GP	W	L	OTL	GF	GA	Pts
Calgary Tigers	30	16	10	4	70	61	36
Regina Capitals/Vancouver Maroons	30	15	13	2	110	97	32
Edmonton Eskimos	30	11	14	5	81	86	27
Saskatoon Crescents	30	11	16	3	82	99	25
