= 1934–35 NWHL season =

The 1934–35 NWHL season was the second season of the North West Hockey League, a minor professional ice hockey league in the Northwestern United States and Canada. Five teams participated in the league, and the Vancouver Lions won the championship.

== Regular season ==
	GP	W	L	T	GF	GA	Pts
Seattle Seahawks	32	20	9	3	98	69	43
Portland Buckaroos	32	15	10	7	83	72	37
Vancouver Lions	32	15	11	6	105	81	36
Edmonton Eskimos	26	7	15	4	77	101	18
Calgary Tigers	26	3	15	8	60	104	14

Note: The Calgary and Edmonton teams were disbanded on February 26 due to poor attendance and high travel costs.

== Playoffs ==
=== Semi-final ===
Best of 3

Date	Winner	Loser	Location
March 14	Portland 3	Vancouver 0	Portland
March 15	Vancouver 2	Portland 0	Vancouver
March 17	Vancouver 2	Portland 1	Portland

Vancouver Lions beat Portland Buckaroos 2 wins to 1.

=== Final ===
Best of 5

Date	Winner	Loser	Location
March 20	Seattle 4	Vancouver 1	Seattle
March 22	Vancouver 4	Seattle 3	Vancouver
March 24	Seattle 5	Vancouver 2	Seattle
March 25	Vancouver 3	Seattle 2	Vancouver
March 27	Vancouver 2	Seattle 1	Seattle

Vancouver Lions beat Seattle Seahawks 3 wins to 2.
