= 1935–36 NWHL season =

The 1935–36 NWHL season was the third and final season of the North West Hockey League, a minor professional ice hockey league in the Northwestern United States and Canada. Five teams participated in the league, and the Seattle Seahawks won the championship.

== Regular season ==
	GP	W	L	T	GF	GA	Pts
Seattle Seahawks	40	20	14	6	103	87	46
Portland Buckaroos	40	18	14	8	88	67	44
Vancouver Lions	40	18	17	5	125	117	41
Edmonton Eskimos	40	14	19	7	97	105	35
Calgary Tigers	40	15	21	4	107	141	34

== Playoffs ==
=== Semi-final ===
Best of 3

Date	Winner	Loser	Location
March 15	Portland 3	Vancouver 2	Portland
March 16	Vancouver 1	Portland 0	Vancouver
March 19	Vancouver 2	Portland 1	Portland

Vancouver Lions beat Portland Buckaroos 2 wins to 1.

=== Final ===
Best of 5

Date	Winner	Loser	Location
March 22	Seattle 3	Vancouver 2	Seattle
March 23	Vancouver 6	Seattle 4	Vancouver
March 25	Seattle 6	Vancouver 3	Seattle
March 27	Seattle 2	Vancouver 1	Vancouver

Seattle Seahawks beat Vancouver Lions 3 wins to 1.
