= Seattle Sea Hawks (ice hockey) =

- City: Seattle, Washington
- League: North West Hockey League (1933–36); Pacific Coast Hockey League (1936–41)
- Founded: 1933
- Operated: 1933–41
- Home arena: Civic Ice Arena
- Colors: Blue, white, red
- Head coach: Frank Foyston

Franchise history
- 1933–40: Seattle Sea Hawks
- 1940–41: Seattle Olympics

Championships
- Playoff championships: 1 (1935–36)

The Seattle Sea Hawks (sometimes written as Seattle Seahawks) were a minor professional hockey team based in Seattle, Washington, playing at the Civic Ice Arena. The Sea Hawks began as a founding member of the North West Hockey League, playing in that league for its three-season existence from 1933 to 1936, before joining the second iteration of the Pacific Coast Hockey League until 1941. They were the NWHL champions in 1935–36. For their final season in 1940–41, the team was sold to new ownership and renamed the Seattle Olympics.

Their first coach and general manager was Frank Foyston, a former Seattle Metropolitan and a member of the Hockey Hall of Fame.

== Notable alumni ==
Various National Hockey League players were members of the team at one time or another, including:

- Ken Doraty: 42 points in 48 games in 1938–39
- Gord Fraser: 19 points in 27 games in 1933–34
- Art Gagné: 5 points in 10 games in 1935–36
- Frank Jerwa: 73 points in 87 games between 1937 and 1939
- Vic Ripley: 26 points in 36 games in 1939–40
- Johnny Sheppard: 46 points in 75 games in 1934–36
