= 1933–34 NWHL season =

The 1933–34 NWHL season was the first season of the North West Hockey League, a minor professional ice hockey league in the Northwestern United States and Canada. Five teams participated in the league, and the Calgary Tigers won the championship.

== Regular season ==
	GP	W	L	T	GF	GA	Pts
Edmonton Eskimos	34	18	12	4	98	91	40
Calgary Tigers	34	17	11	6	117	76	40
Vancouver Lions	34	17	16	1	95	111	35
Seattle Seahawks	34	15	17	2	99	95	32
Portland Buckaroos	34	10	21	3	80	116	23

== Playoffs ==
=== Semi-final ===
Best of 3

Date	Winner	Loser	Location
March 13	Vancouver 4	Edmonton 1	Seattle
March 15	Vancouver 3	Edmonton 1	Vancouver

Vancouver Lions beat Edmonton Eskimos 2 wins to none.

=== Final ===
Best of 5

Date	Winner	Loser	Location
March 18	Calgary 6	Vancouver 2	Seattle
March 21	Vancouver 7	Calgary 3	Vancouver
March 23	Calgary 2	Vancouver 1	Vancouver
March 26	Vancouver 2	Calgary 1	Vancouver
March 28	Calgary 6	Vancouver 1	Vancouver

Calgary Tigers beat Vancouver Lions 3 wins to 2.
