= North West Hockey League =

The North West Hockey League was an ice hockey minor league with teams in the western United States and western Canada that existed from 1933 to 1936. It was formed from the Calgary and Vancouver franchises of the Western Canada Hockey League and three new teams.

The league lasted for three seasons, after which the Portland, Vancouver, and Seattle franchises left to form a reconstituted Pacific Coast Hockey League.

== Teams ==
- Calgary Tigers
- Edmonton Eskimos
- Portland Buckaroos
- Seattle Sea Hawks
- Vancouver Lions

== Champions ==
- 1934: Calgary Tigers
- 1935: Vancouver Lions
- 1936: Seattle Sea Hawks
