= 1930 Stanley Cup Final =

1930 ice hockey championship series

	1	2	Total
Boston Bruins	0	3	0
Montreal Canadiens	3	4	2
- Location(s): Boston: Boston Garden (1); Montreal: Montreal Forum (2)
- Format: best-of-three
- Coaches: Boston: Art Ross; Montreal: Cecil Hart
- Captains: Boston: Lionel Hitchman; Montreal: Sylvio Mantha
- Dates: April 1–3, 1930
- Series-winning goal: Howie Morenz (1:00, second)
- Hall of Famers: Canadiens: George Hainsworth (1961); Aurele Joliat (1947); Sylvio Mantha (1960); Howie Morenz (1945); Bruins: Marty Barry (1965); Dit Clapper (1947); Mickey MacKay (1952); Harry Oliver (1967); Eddie Shore (1947); Tiny Thompson (1959); Cooney Weiland (1971); Coaches: Art Ross (1949, player)

The 1930 Stanley Cup Final was played between the Boston Bruins and the Montreal Canadiens. In a best of three series, Montreal won 4–3 and 3–0 to win the team's third Stanley Cup title.

== Paths to the Finals ==
The defending champion Boston Bruins had an outstanding season. Their final record of 38–5–1 translates to an .875 winning percentage, the best in NHL history. The team did not lose two games in a row all season, until being swept by the Canadiens. This prompted the change for the following year in the Finals format to a best-of-five format.

== Game summaries ==
The Finals was a best-of-three series. The Canadiens had lost all four of their regular-season meetings with the Bruins. Captain Sylvio Mantha was the leader, scoring in both final games.

Game one saw the Bruins play way below their usual form and George Hainsworth picked up a shutout. In game two, Howie Morenz scored what proved to be the winning goal at 17:50 of the second period and the Canadiens won the Stanley Cup. It was the first time all year that the Bruins lost two games in a row.

April 1	Montreal Canadiens	3–0	Boston Bruins	Boston Madison Square Garden	Recap
No scoring		First period	No scoring
Albert Leduc (1) - 8:43; Sylvio Mantha (1) - 13:17		Second period	No scoring
Pit Lepine (2) - 6:27		Third period	No scoring
George Hainsworth		Goalie stats	Tiny Thompson

April 3	Boston Bruins	3–4	Montreal Canadiens	Montreal Forum	Recap
No scoring		First period	9:10 - Bert McCaffrey (1); 17:36 - Nick Wasnie (2)
Eddie Shore (1) - 10:42		Second period	1:33 - Sylvio Mantha (2); 15:43 - Howie Morenz (3)
Percy Galbraith (1) - 8:47; Dit Clapper (4) - 10:59		Third period	No scoring
Tiny Thompson		Goalie stats	George Hainsworth

Montreal won series 2–0

== Stanley Cup engraving ==
The 1930 Stanley Cup was presented to Canadiens captain Sylvio Mantha by NHL President Frank Calder following the Canadiens 4–3 win over the Bruins in game two.

The following Canadiens players and staff had their names engraved on the Stanley Cup

1929–30 Montreal Canadiens

=== Players ===
Centres

- 7 Howie Morenz
- 9 Alfred Pit Lepine

Wingers

- 4 Aurel Joliat
- 5 Armand Mondou
- 6 Nick Wasnie
- 10 Wildor Larochelle
- 11 Bert McCaffrey
- 16 Gus Rivers

Defencemen

- 2 Sylvio Mantha (captain)
- 3 Marty Burke
- 8 Albert Leduc
- 12 Georges Mantha
- 14 Gerald Carson

Goaltenders

- 1 George Hainsworth

=== Coaching and administrative staff ===
- Louis Athanase David (President), Fernand Rinfeet (Director)
- Joseph Cattarinich (Vice President/Owner), Edouard St. Pere (Vice President)
- Joseph Viateur "Leo" Dandurand (Secretary-Treasurer/Owner), Henry Gray (Director)
- Cecil Hart (Manager-Coach), Georges Richer* (Director)
- Hilarion A. "Louis" Letourneau (Director/Owner), Dr. James Albert Corrigan (Team Physician)
- Amerdee Monet (Director)
- Edward Dulfour (Trainer), Jim McKenna (Asst. Trainer),
- Joseph-Pierre "J.P." Le Petit† (Asst. Trainer/left off cup-on team picture)

=== Stanley Cup engraving ===
- * Mistake – Georges Richer was engraved as a physician, but his official title was a member of the board of directors.
- †J.P. Le Petit's name was sometimes misspelled Le Petite with an extra E.
- Montreal included the date, day, game number, location, and score for each playoff game on the Stanley Cup. In 1930, 1931, 1932, 1936, 1937, 1938, 1939, each playoff game, date and score by the winning team were included on the Stanley Cup.

== See also ==
- 1929–30 NHL season

Preceded by Boston Bruins; 1929	Montreal Canadiens; Stanley Cup champions 1930	Succeeded by Montreal Canadiens; 1931
