= 1931 Stanley Cup Final =

1931 ice hockey championship series

	1	2	3	4	5	Total
Chicago Black Hawks	1	2**	3***	2	0	2
Montreal Canadiens	2	1**	2***	4	2	3
- * – Denotes overtime period(s)
- Location(s): Chicago: Chicago Stadium (1, 2); Montreal: Montreal Forum (3–5)
- Format: best-of-five
- Coaches: Chicago: Dick Irvin; Montreal: Cecil Hart
- Captains: Chicago: Ty Arbour; Montreal: Sylvio Mantha
- Dates: April 3–14, 1931
- Series-winning goal: Johnny Gagnon (9:59, second)
- Hall of Famers: Canadiens: George Hainsworth (1961); Aurele Joliat (1947); Sylvio Mantha (1960); Howie Morenz (1945); Black Hawks: Charlie Gardiner (1945); Coaches: Dick Irvin (1958, player)

The 1931 Stanley Cup Final was played between the Montreal Canadiens and the Chicago Black Hawks, making their first Stanley Cup Finals appearance. The defending champions Canadiens, won the series to become the second NHL team to win back-to-back championships. Former player and now coach, Chicago's Dick Irvin, made his Finals coaching debut against the team he would later coach to three Stanley Cup titles.

== Game summaries ==
Over 18,000 fans packed Chicago Stadium for game two to set a record for the largest attendance in hockey history to that time. The triple-overtime game three of the series was (at the time) the longest game in Stanley Cup Finals history, and today remains the fourth-longest game in Stanley Cup Finals history at 113:50.

=== Game five ===
For game five, Foster Hewitt came to Montreal to make the radio broadcast play-by-play and transmission lines carried his broadcast to radio stations across Canada Interest was so high that Montrealers in the thousands lined up for end zone and standing room tickets. Johnny Gagnon opened the scoring in the second period and Howie Morenz scored an insurance goal in the third period. It ended a nine-game goalless streak for Morenz.

April 3	Montreal Canadiens	2–1	Chicago Black Hawks	Chicago Stadium	Recap
Georges Mantha (3) - 4:50		First period	No scoring
No scoring		Second period	No scoring
Pit Lepine (2) - 2:20		Third period	8:20 - Vic Ripley (2)
George Hainsworth		Goalie stats	Charlie Gardiner

April 5	Montreal Canadiens	1–2	2OT	Chicago Black Hawks	Chicago Stadium	Recap
No scoring		First period		No scoring
No scoring		Second period		11:45 - Stew Adams (2)
Nick Wasnie (3) - 12:10		Third period		No scoring
No scoring		Second overtime period		4:50 - Johnny Gottselig (2)
George Hainsworth		Goalie stats		Charlie Gardiner

April 9	Chicago Black Hawks	3–2	3OT	Montreal Canadiens	Montreal Forum	Recap
No scoring		First period		5:15 - Johnny Gagnon (3)
No scoring		Second period		7:29 - Georges Mantha (5)
Mush March (3) - 16:20; Stew Adams (3) - 17:07		Third period		No scoring
Cy Wentworth (1) - 13:50		Third overtime period		No scoring
Charlie Gardiner		Goalie stats		George Hainsworth

April 11	Chicago Black Hawks	2–4	Montreal Canadiens	Montreal Forum	Recap
Johnny Gottselig (3) - 1:33; Ty Arbour (1) - 13:58		First period	No scoring
No scoring		Second period	4:34 - Johnny Gagnon (4)
No scoring		Third period	4:25 - Johnny Gagnon (5); 10:55 - Pit Lepine (3); 17:25 - Pit Lepine (4)
Charlie Gardiner		Goalie stats	George Hainsworth

April 14	Chicago Black Hawks	0–2	Montreal Canadiens	Montreal Forum	Recap
No scoring		First period	No scoring
No scoring		Second period	9:59 - Johnny Gagnon (6)
No scoring		Third period	15:27 - Howie Morenz (1)
Charlie Gardiner		Goalie stats	George Hainsworth

Montreal won series 3–2

== Stanley Cup engraving ==
The 1931 Stanley Cup was presented to Canadiens captain Sylvio Mantha by NHL President Frank Calder following the Canadiens 2–0 win over the Black Hawks in game five.

The following Canadiens players and staff had their names engraved on the Stanley Cup

1930–31 Montreal Canadiens

=== Players ===
Centres

- 7 Howie Morenz
- 9 Alfred Pit Lepine

Wingers

- 4 Aurel Joliat
- 5 Armand Mondou
- 6 Nick Wasnie
- 10 Wildor Larochelle
- 14 Johnny Gagnon
- 16 Gus Rivers

Defencemen

- 2 Sylvio Mantha (captain)
- 3 Marty Burke
- 5 Jean Pusie^
- 8 Albert Leduc
- 11 Art Lesieur
- 12 Georges Mantha

Goaltenders

- 1 George Hainsworth

=== Coaching and administrative staff ===
- Louis Athanase David (President), Edouard St. Pere (Vice President)
- Joseph Cattarinich (Vice President/Owner), Amerdee Monte (Director)
- Joseph Viateur "Leo" Dandurand (Secretary/Owner), Alphonse Raymond (Director)
- Cecil Hart (Manager-Coach), Georges Richer (Treasurer)
- Fernand Rinfeet (Director), Henry Gray (Director)
- Jules Dugal (Business Manager), Dr. James Albert Corrigan (Team Physician)
- Edward Dulfour (Trainer), Jim McKenna (Asst. Trainer)

=== Stanley Cup engraving ===
- #11 Bert McCaffrey (RW) played in 22 regular-season games, but none in the playoffs. #5 Jean Pusie^ (D) played in 6 regular-season games and 3 games in the Finals. Despite McCaffrey playing in at least half of the regular season games and Pusie playing in at least 1 Finals game, their names were left off the Stanley Cup engraving.
- Officially, owner Leo Dandurand was the Manager of the Montreal Canadiens from 1921–22 to 1934–35. However, Cecil Hart was engraved on the Stanley Cup in 1930 and 1931, and he is listed on every team picture for those seasons as Manager. Leo Dandurand would later get his name on the Grey Cup as the President (owner) of Montreal Allouettes in 1949. This made Leo Dandurand the 4th person to win both the Stanley Cup and Grey Cup. (See Joe Miller, Lionel Conacher, Carl Voss, Harold Ballard, Norman Kwong & Wayne Gretzky, other persons who won both the Grey Cup and Stanley Cup.)
- Hilarion A. "Louis" Letourneau (Owner/Director) gave up his position on the Board of Directors of the Montreal Canadiens after the 1930 Stanley Cup. He would sell his shares in 1932. So the name was not included on the 1931 Stanley Cup engraving.

== See also ==
- 1930–31 NHL season

== Notes ==
Preceded by Montreal Canadiens; 1930	Montreal Canadiens; Stanley Cup champions 1931	Succeeded by Toronto Maple Leafs; 1932
