= Art Lesieur =

American ice hockey player

- Born: September 13, 1907 Fall River, Massachusetts, U.S.
- Died: December 31, 1967 (aged 60)
- Height: 5 ft 11 in (180 cm)
- Weight: 190 lb (86 kg; 13 st 8 lb)
- Position: Defense
- Shot: Right
- Played for: Montreal Canadiens; Chicago Black Hawks
- Playing career: 1927–1946

Joseph Arthur Lesieur (September 13, 1907 – December 31, 1967) was an American professional ice hockey defenseman who played 100 games in the National Hockey League with the Montreal Canadiens and Chicago Black Hawks between 1928 and 1936.

Born in Fall River, Massachusetts, in 1931 Lesieur became the first American-born player to have his name engraved on the Stanley Cup as a member of the Montreal Canadiens. Lesieur played most of his professional hockey career with the Providence Reds of the Canadian–American Hockey League (Can-Am) and the International American Hockey League (IAHL/AHL), where he led the Reds to 3 Fontaine Cup titles and 2 Calder Cup championships as a player, team captain and/or player coach. He was head coach of the Mount Saint Charles Academy for four seasons and the Brown Bears men's ice hockey for one season (1938–39) while continuing play for Reds.

In 1941, just days after the attack on Pearl Harbor and midway through the hockey season, Art became a national celebrity as the first U.S.-born professional hockey player to be drafted into the armed forces, turning in his team colors for Army drab. He served nearly five years, of which 32 months were in combat overseas commanding artillery batteries in both the European and North African theaters.

Lesieur was inducted into the Rhode Island Hockey Hall of fame in 2021.

== Career statistics ==
=== Regular season and playoffs ===
			Regular season					Playoffs
Season	Team	League	GP	G	A	Pts	PIM	GP	G	A	Pts	PIM
1927–28	Providence Reds	Can-Am	1	0	0	0	2	—	—	—	—	—
1927–28	Nashua Nationals	NEHL	23	3	2	5	20	4	1	2	3	6
1928–29	Montreal Canadiens	NHL	14	0	0	0	0	—	—	—	—	—
1928–29	Chicago Black Hawks	NHL	3	0	0	0	0	—	—	—	—	—
1928–29	Providence Reds	Can-Am	16	1	0	1	16	4	0	0	0	2
1929–30	Providence Reds	Can-Am	40	3	0	3	57	3	0	0	0	4
1930–31	Montreal Canadiens	NHL	21	2	0	2	16	10	0	0	0	4
1930–31	Providence Reds	Can-Am	19	3	3	6	26	—	—	—	—	—
1931–32	Montreal Canadiens	NHL	24	1	2	3	12	4	0	0	0	0
1931–32	Providence Reds	Can-Am	18	4	3	7	35	—	—	—	—	—
1932–33	Providence Reds	Can-Am	25	1	3	4	34	—	—	—	—	—
1933–34	Providence Reds	Can-Am	40	2	1	3	68	3	0	1	1	8
1934–35	Providence Reds	Can-Am	47	5	9	14	80	6	1	0	1	10
1935–36	Montreal Canadiens	NHL	38	1	0	1	24	—	—	—	—	—
1936–37	Providence Reds	IAHL	51	3	7	10	54	3	0	0	0	2
1937–38	Providence Reds	IAHL	47	6	10	16	36	7	0	1	1	8
1938–39	Providence Reds	IAHL	54	5	7	12	53	5	0	0	0	4
1939–40	Providence Reds	IAHL	54	6	7	13	26	8	0	0	0	4
1940–41	Pittsburgh Hornets	AHL	32	2	0	2	22	—	—	—	—	—
1945–46	Minneapolis Millers	USHL	8	0	2	2	4	—	—	—	—	—
Can-Am totals			206	19	19	38	318	16	1	1	2	24
IAHL/AHL totals			238	22	31	53	340	23	0	1	1	18
NHL totals			100	4	2	6	52	14	0	0	0	14
