= Armand Mondou =

Canadian ice hockey player

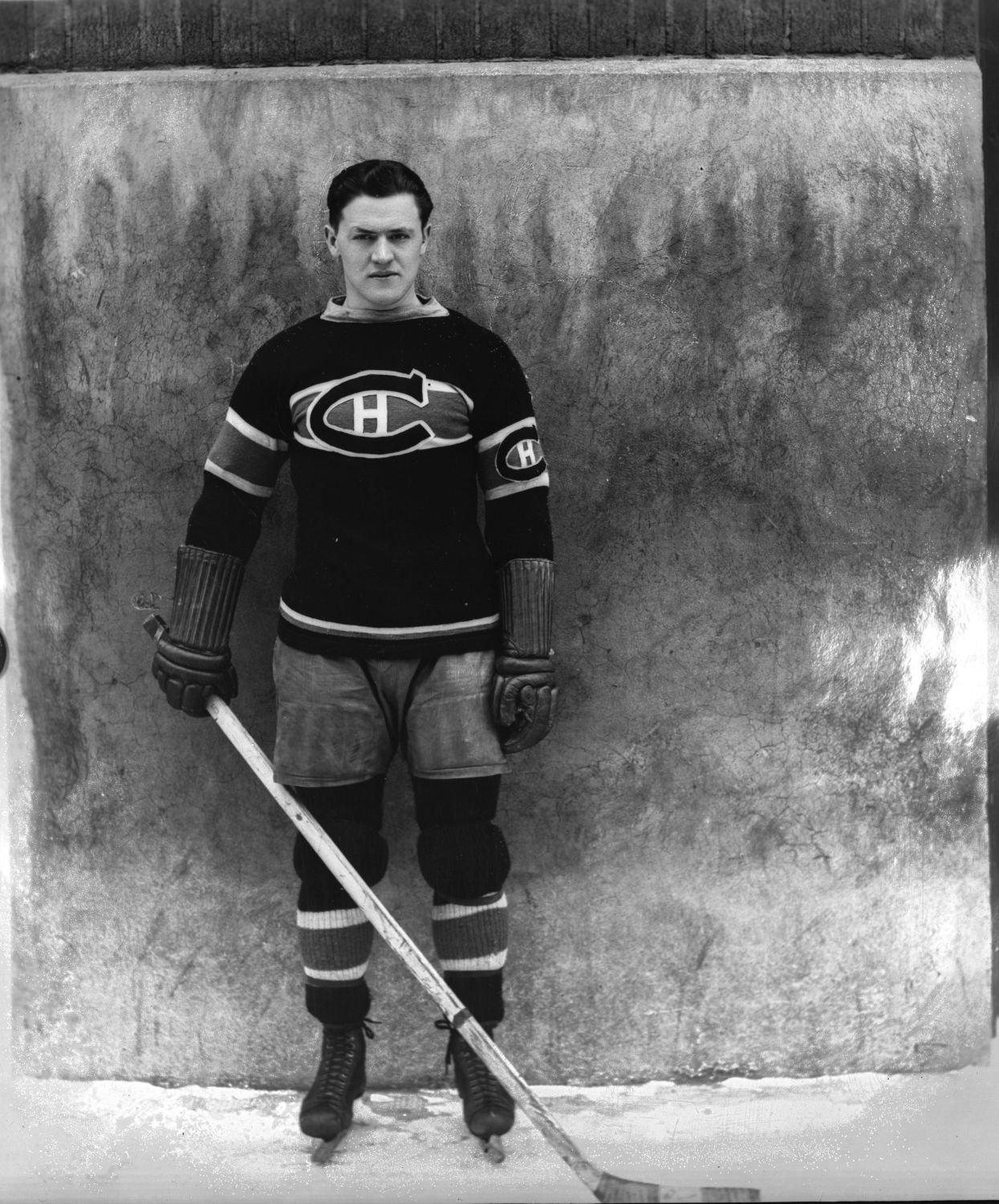
- Born: June 27, 1905 Yamaska, Quebec, Canada
- Died: September 13, 1976 (aged 71)
- Height: 5 ft 10 in (178 cm)
- Weight: 175 lb (79 kg; 12 st 7 lb)
- Position: Forward
- Shot: Left
- Played for: Montreal Canadiens
- Playing career: 1926–1940

Joseph Armand Mondou (June 27, 1905 - September 13, 1976) was a Canadian ice hockey forward with the Montreal Canadiens of the National Hockey League (NHL). He was a member of two Stanley Cup championship teams; with Montreal in 1930 and 1931.

Mondou was born in Yamaska, Quebec. Mondou played his minor hockey in the Montreal City Hockey League before turning professional with the Providence Reds in 1926. He made his NHL debut in 1928 and retired following the 1940 season. He played his entire National Hockey League career with the Montreal Canadiens.

In 1934, Mondou was the first NHL player to attempt a penalty shot; George Hainsworth saved his attempt.

== Career statistics ==
			Regular season					Playoffs
Season	Team	League	GP	G	A	Pts	PIM	GP	G	A	Pts	PIM
1925–26	Montreal St. Francis Xavier	MCHL	—	—	—	—	—	—	—	—	—	—
1925–26	Montreal Nationale	MCHL	8	0	2	2	6	—	—	—	—	—
1926–27	Providence Reds	Can-Am	32	6	2	8	35	—	—	—	—	—
1927–28	Providence Reds	Can-Am	40	12	9	21	50	—	—	—	—	—
1928–29	Providence Reds	Can-Am	10	1	0	1	8	—	—	—	—	—
1928–29	Montreal Canadiens	NHL	32	3	4	7	6	3	0	0	0	2
1929–30	Montreal Canadiens	NHL	44	3	5	8	24	6	1	1	2	6
1930–31	Montreal Canadiens	NHL	40	5	4	9	10	8	0	0	0	0
1931–32	Montreal Canadiens	NHL	47	6	12	18	22	4	1	2	3	2
1932–33	Montreal Canadiens	NHL	24	1	3	4	15	—	—	—	—	—
1932–33	Providence Reds	Can-Am	23	9	8	17	14	2	0	0	0	0
1933–34	Montreal Canadiens	NHL	48	5	3	8	4	1	0	1	1	0
1933–34	Quebec Castors	Can-Am	1	1	1	2	0	—	—	—	—	—
1934–35	Montreal Canadiens	NHL	45	9	15	24	6	2	0	1	1	0
1935–36	Montreal Canadiens	NHL	36	7	1	18	10	—	—	—	—	—
1936–37	Montreal Canadiens	NHL	7	1	1	2	0	5	0	0	0	0
1936–37	New Haven Eagles	IAHL	35	6	22	28	12	—	—	—	—	—
1937–38	Montreal Canadiens	NHL	7	2	4	6	0	—	—	—	—	—
1938–39	Montreal Canadiens	NHL	34	3	7	10	2	3	1	0	1	2
1938–39	New Haven Eagles	IAHL	14	8	5	13	26	—	—	—	—	—
1939–40	Montreal Canadiens	NHL	21	2	2	4	0	—	—	—	—	—
1939–40	New Haven Eagles	IAHL	21	6	15	21	4	3	0	0	0	2
NHL totals			385	47	71	118	99	32	3	5	8	12

== Awards and achievements ==
- Played in NHL All-Star Game (1939)
