= Francis Carson =

Francis Carson can refer to:

- Frank Carson (ice hockey) (Reginald Francis Carson, 1902–1957), Canadian ice hockey player
- Frank Carson (Hugh Francis Carson, 1926–2012), Irish comedian
- Frank Hough (Francis Carson Hough, born 1944), Australian politician
