= 1931–32 NHL transactions =

The following is a list of all team-to-team transactions that have occurred in the National Hockey League (NHL) during the 1931–32 NHL season. It lists which team each player has been traded to and for which player(s) or other consideration(s), if applicable.

== Transactions ==
May 13, 1931	To Boston Bruins Bud Cook	To Montreal Canadiens cash
August 25, 1931	To Boston Bruins Joe Jerwa	To New York Rangers Dutch Gainor
September 27, 1931	To Chicago Black Hawks Paul Thompson	To New York Rangers Art Somers; Vic Desjardins
October 18, 1931	To Detroit Falcons Doug Young	To New York Americans Ronnie Martin
October 19, 1931	To Detroit Falcons Frank Peters	To New York Rangers cash
October 27, 1931	To Chicago Black Hawks Gene Carrigan	To New York Rangers cash
December 29, 1931	To Detroit Falcons Frank Carson; Hap Emms	To New York Americans Tommy Filmore; Bert McInenly
February 1, 1932	To Boston Bruins Eddie Jeremiah	To New York Americans cash
February 8, 1932	To Toronto Maple Leafs Earl Miller	To Chicago Black Hawks cash
April 13, 1932	To Boston Bruins Billy Burch	To New York Americans cash
