= Nick Wasnie =

Canadian ice hockey player

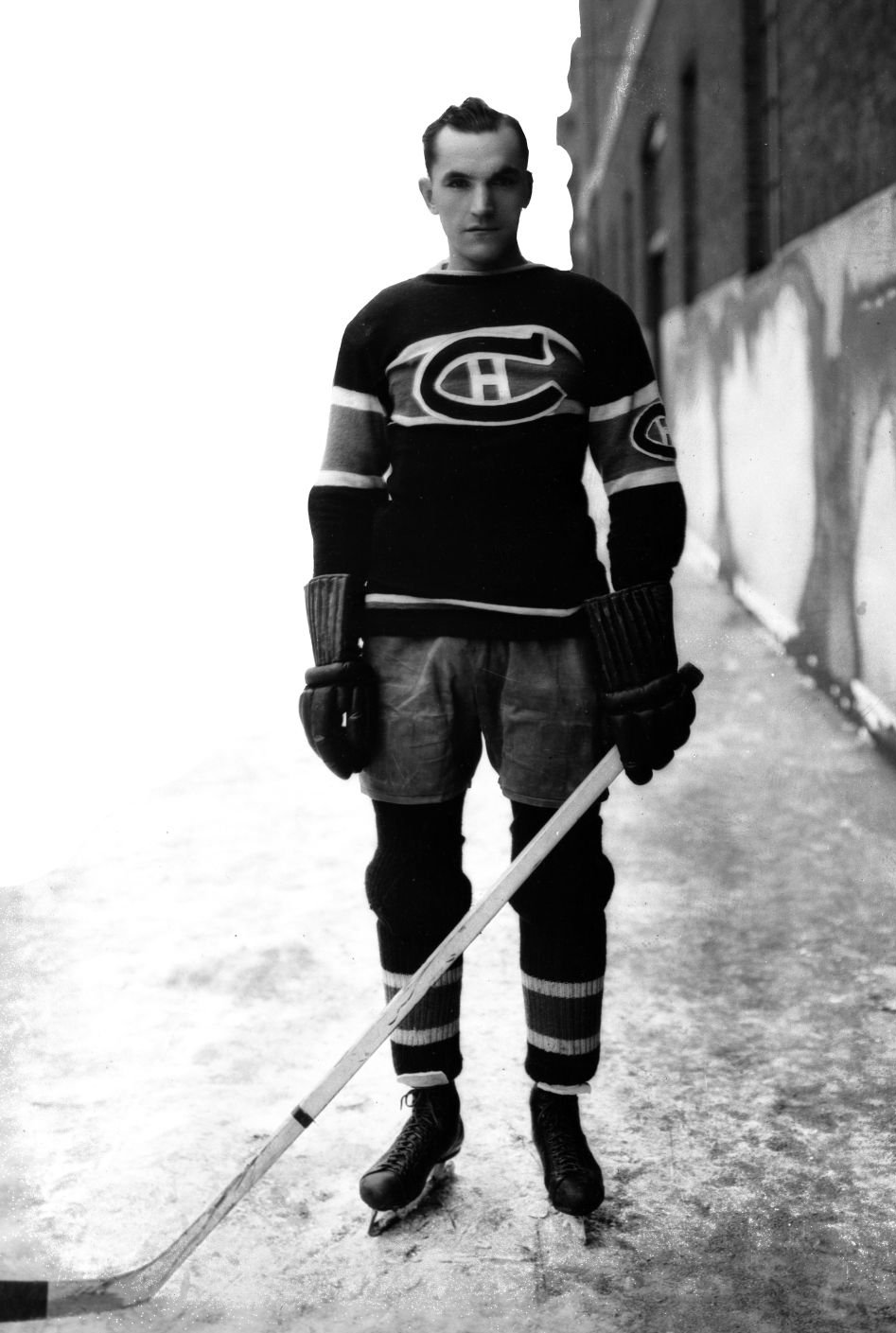
- Born: January 28, 1903 Winnipeg, Manitoba, Canada
- Died: May 26, 1991 (aged 88) Brainerd, Minnesota, United States
- Height: 5 ft 10 in (178 cm)
- Weight: 175 lb (79 kg; 12 st 7 lb)
- Position: Right wing
- Shot: Right
- Played for: Chicago Black Hawks; St. Louis Eagles; Montreal Canadiens; New York Americans; Ottawa Senators
- Playing career: 1925–1940

Nickolas Waesne (January 28, 1903 – May 26, 1991), better known as Nick Wasnie, was a Canadian ice hockey right winger who played seven seasons in the National Hockey League for the Chicago Black Hawks, Montreal Canadiens, New York Americans, Ottawa Senators and St. Louis Eagles between 1927 and 1935. He won the Stanley Cup twice with the Montreal Canadiens in 1930 and 1931. After several NHL teams folded in the 1930s, Wasnie spent several years in various minor leagues, retiring from playing in 1940.

He died in Brainerd, Minnesota in 1991.

Wasnie was inducted into the Manitoba Sports Hall of Fame in 2019.

== Career statistics ==
=== Regular season and playoffs ===
| | | | Regular season | | | | | Playoffs |
| Season | Team | League | GP | G | A | Pts | PIM | GP | G | A | Pts | PIM |
|---|---|---|---|---|---|---|---|---|---|---|---|---|
| 1925–26 | Winnipeg Maroons | CHL | 31 | 7 | 1 | 8 | 35 | 5 | 1 | 0 | 1 | 0 |
| 1926–27 | Winnipeg Maroons | AHA | 21 | 7 | 3 | 10 | 33 | — | — | — | — | — |
| 1927–28 | Chicago Black Hawks | NHL | 14 | 1 | 0 | 1 | 22 | — | — | — | — | — |
| 1927–28 | Quebec Castors | Can-Am | 22 | 8 | 3 | 11 | 32 | 6 | 3 | 0 | 3 | 18 |
| 1928–29 | Newark Bulldogs | Can-Am | 40 | 14 | 6 | 20 | 76 | — | — | — | — | — |
| 1929–30 | Montreal Canadiens | NHL | 44 | 12 | 11 | 23 | 64 | 6 | 2 | 2 | 4 | 12 |
| 1930–31 | Montreal Canadiens | NHL | 44 | 9 | 2 | 11 | 26 | 10 | 4 | 1 | 5 | 8 |
| 1931–32 | Montreal Canadiens | NHL | 48 | 10 | 2 | 12 | 16 | 4 | 0 | 0 | 0 | 0 |
| 1932–33 | New York Americans | NHL | 48 | 11 | 12 | 23 | 36 | — | — | — | — | — |
| 1933–34 | Ottawa Senators | NHL | 37 | 11 | 6 | 17 | 10 | — | — | — | — | — |
| 1934–35 | St. Louis Eagles | NHL | 13 | 3 | 1 | 4 | 2 | — | — | — | — | — |
| 1934–35 | Minneapolis Millers | CHL | 33 | 16 | 19 | 35 | 32 | 5 | 2 | 3 | 5 | 4 |
| 1935–36 | Rochester Cardinals | IHL | 7 | 3 | 4 | 7 | 7 | — | — | — | — | — |
| 1936–37 | Kansas City Greyhounds | AHA | 46 | 18 | 19 | 37 | 52 | 3 | 0 | 1 | 1 | 0 |
| 1937–38 | Kansas City Greyhounds | AHA | 45 | 9 | 12 | 21 | 14 | — | — | — | — | — |
| 1938–39 | Kansas City Greyhounds | AHA | 48 | 34 | 27 | 61 | 19 | — | — | — | — | — |
| 1939–40 | Kansas City Greyhounds | AHA | 48 | 18 | 21 | 39 | 36 | — | — | — | — | — |
| AHA totals | | | 208 | 86 | 82 | 168 | 154 | 3 | 0 | 1 | 1 | 0 |
| NHL totals | | | 248 | 57 | 34 | 91 | 176 | 20 | 6 | 3 | 9 | 20 |

== Awards and achievements ==
- Stanley Cup Championships (1930, 1931)
- CHL First All-Star Team (1935)
- AHA First All-Star Team (1937)
- Honoured Member of the Manitoba Hockey Hall of Fame
- Member of the Manitoba Sports Hall of Fame (2019)
