= Jean Pusie =

Canadian ice hockey player

- Born: October 15, 1910 Montreal, Quebec, Canada
- Died: April 21, 1956 (aged 45) Montreal, Quebec, Canada
- Height: 6 ft 0 in (183 cm)
- Weight: 210 lb (95 kg; 15 st 0 lb)
- Position: Defence
- Shot: Left
- Played for: Montreal Canadiens; New York Rangers; Boston Bruins
- Playing career: 1929–1943

Joseph Jean Baptiste Pusie (October 15, 1910 – April 21, 1956) was a Canadian professional ice hockey player, boxer and wrestler. Pusie played parts of five seasons in the National Hockey League with the Montreal Canadiens, New York Rangers, and the Boston Bruins between 1930 and 1936. He won the Stanley Cup in 1931 with the Canadiens, playing three out of five games in the Stanley Cup Final. Pusie's name was left off the Cup, even though he officially qualified.

Pusie scored his only NHL goal for the Boston Bruins. It occurred on November 24, 1934 in Boston's 4-1 victory over the St. Louis Eagles.

Pusie was born in Montreal, Quebec but grew up in Chambly, Quebec. He played for 21 different teams in various minor leagues around North America and changed teams 28 times. He was known for his antics. His professional career lasted from 1929 to 1943.

== Career statistics ==
=== Regular season and playoffs ===
			Regular season					Playoffs
Season	Team	League	GP	G	A	Pts	PIM	GP	G	A	Pts	PIM
1927–28	Montreal-Rosseau	CAHS	—	—	—	—	—	—	—	—	—	—
1928–29	Montreal Nationale	MCHL	—	—	—	—	—	—	—	—	—	—
1929–30	Verdun CPR	MMRHL	—	—	—	—	—	—	—	—	—	—
1929–30	Montreal Northern Electric	MTRHL	—	—	—	—	—	—	—	—	—	—
1929–30	London Panthers	IHL	11	1	0	1	2	2	0	0	0	2
1930–31	Galt Terriers	OPHL	22	16	8	24	29	2	0	1	1	0
1930–31	Montreal Canadiens	NHL	6	0	0	0	0	3	0	0	0	0
1930–31	Detroit Olympics	IHL	4	0	0	0	0	—	—	—	—	—
1931–32	Montreal Canadiens	NHL	1	0	0	0	0	—	—	—	—	—
1931–32	Philadelphia Arrows	Can-Am	14	0	4	4	8	—	—	—	—	—
1931–32	Trois-Rivieres Renards	ECHA	14	5	2	7	24	—	—	—	—	—
1932–33	Quebec Castors	Can-Am	1	0	1	1	0	—	—	—	—	—
1932–33	Regina Capitals/Vancouver Maroons	WCHL	30	30	22	52	31	2	0	1	1	0
1933–34	New York Rangers	NHL	19	0	2	2	17	—	—	—	—	—
1933–34	London Tecumsehs	IHL	26	6	6	12	47	6	3	2	5	2
1934–35	Boston Bruins	NHL	8	1	0	1	0	4	0	0	0	0
1934–35	Boston Tigers	Can-Am	34	14	13	27	59	—	—	—	—	—
1935–36	Montreal Canadiens	NHL	31	0	2	2	11	—	—	—	—	—
1935–36	Boston Cubs	Can-Am	16	4	5	9	18	—	—	—	—	—
1936–37	Providence Reds	IAHL	29	5	8	13	39	2	0	0	0	0
1937–38	Cleveland Barons	IAHL	39	0	6	6	13	2	1	1	2	0
1938–39	St. Louis Flyers	AHA	35	18	12	30	60	5	2	2	4	16
1939–40	Vancouver Lions	PCHL	30	13	12	25	85	—	—	—	—	—
1940–41	Seattle Olympics	PCHL	28	10	13	23	39	—	—	—	—	—
1941–42	St. Louis Flyers	AHA	35	9	12	21	19	—	—	—	—	—
1943–44	Montreal Locomotive	MCHL	—	—	—	—	—	—	—	—	—	—
1943–44	Montreal Army	MCHL	6	0	2	2	12	2	0	1	1	2
1944–45	Montreal NDG Monarchs	MCHL	—	—	—	—	—	—	—	—	—	—
1946–47	Verdun Eagles	QPHL	6	3	4	7	0	—	—	—	—	—
NHL totals			65	1	4	5	28	7	0	0	0	0
