= Gus Rivers =

Canadian ice hockey player

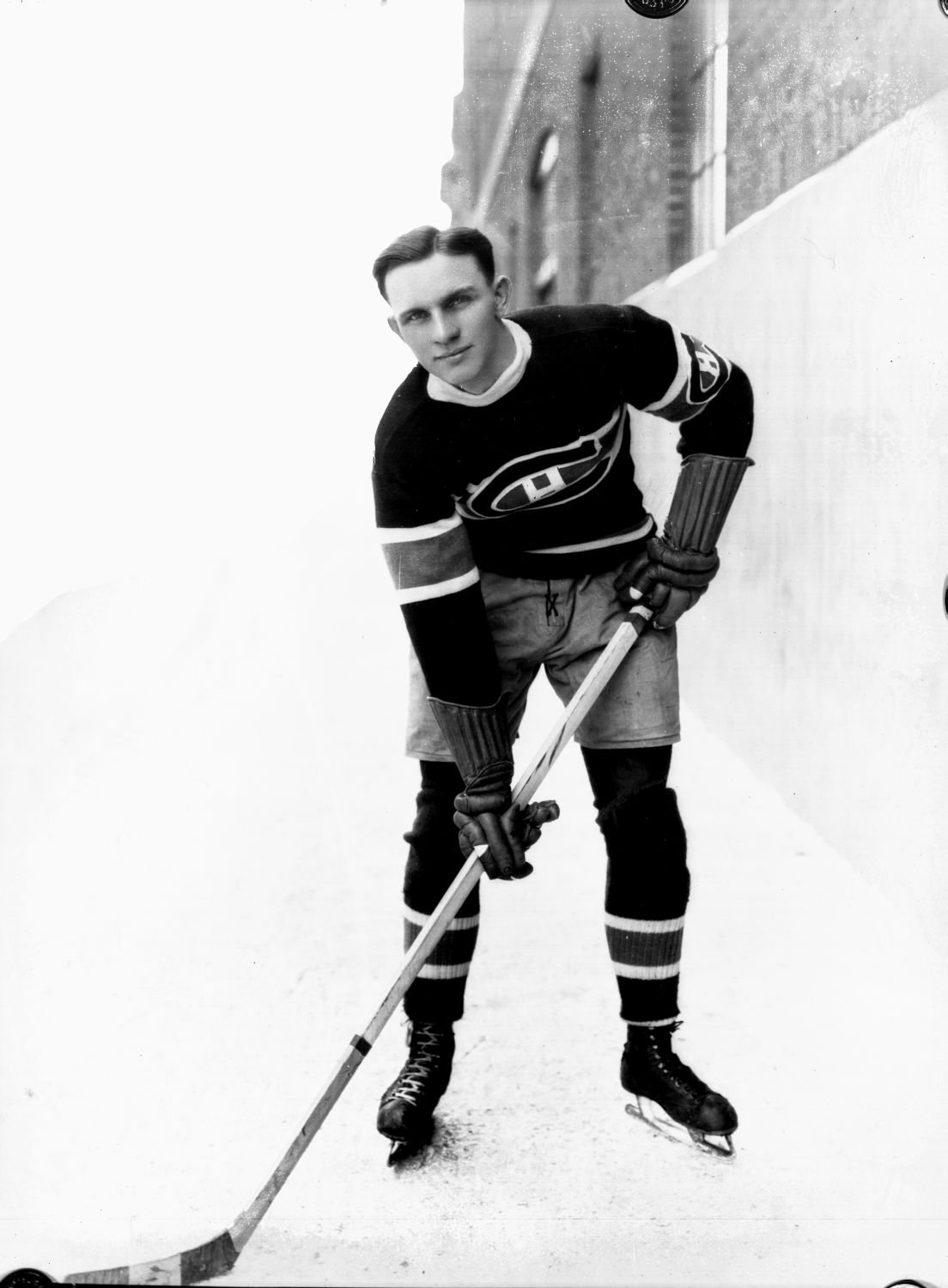
- Born: November 19, 1909 Winnipeg, Manitoba, Canada
- Died: October 15, 1985 (aged 75)
- Height: 5 ft 11 in (180 cm)
- Weight: 180 lb (82 kg; 12 st 12 lb)
- Position: Right wing
- Shot: Right
- Played for: Montreal Canadiens
- Playing career: 1927–1937

Augustus George Rivers (November 19, 1909 - October 15, 1985) was a Canadian ice hockey forward. He played 88 games in the National Hockey League with the Montreal Canadiens from 1930 to 1932. The rest of his career, which lasted from 1927 to 1937, was spent in the minor leagues. With the Canadiens, Rivers won the Stanley Cup in both 1930 and 1931.

== Playing career ==
Born in Winnipeg, Manitoba, under the name Gustave Desrivieres, Rivers played his entire National Hockey League career with the Montreal Canadiens. It started in 1930. He would retire after the 1932 season. He went on to win the Stanley Cup with Montreal twice, in 1930 and 1931.

== =League play ==
			Regular season					Playoffs
Season	Team	League	GP	G	A	Pts	PIM	GP	G	A	Pts	PIM
1925–26	Winnipeg Victorias	WJrHL	—	—	—	—	—	—	—	—	—	—
1926–27	Elmwood Millionaires	WJrHL	—	—	—	—	—	—	—	—	—	—
1927–28	Elmwood Millionaires	WJrHL	5	2	1	3	6	2	2	1	3	0
1927–28	Winnipeg Eaton's	WSrHL	6	1	2	3	8	2	1	1	2	4
1927–28	Elmwood Maple Leafs	M-Cup	—	—	—	—	—	3	2	0	2	0
1928–29	University of Manitoba	MTBHL	5	6	2	8	4	1	0	0	0	0
1928–29	Winnipeg CPR	WSrHL	9	7	5	12	8	3	0	2	2	2
1929–30	Montreal Canadiens	NHL	19	1	0	1	2	6	1	0	1	2
1929–30	Winnipeg Hockey Club	MHL	6	1	4	5	12	—	—	—	—	—
1930–31	Montreal Canadiens	NHL	44	2	5	7	4	10	1	0	1	0
1931–32	Montreal Canadiens	NHL	25	1	0	1	4	—	—	—	—	—
1931–32	Providence Reds	Can-Am	19	11	12	23	10	5	1	2	3	2
1932–33	Providence Reds	Can-Am	43	11	18	29	25	2	1	1	2	0
1933–34	Providence Reds	Can-Am	35	11	8	19	17	3	0	0	0	0
1934–35	Providence Reds	Can-Am	45	18	23	41	8	6	1	1	2	7
1935–36	Providence Reds	Can-Am	45	13	17	30	25	7	3	3	6	2
1936–37	Providence Reds	IAHL	46	8	14	22	17	3	2	1	3	0
Can-Am totals			187	64	78	142	85	23	6	7	13	11
NHL totals			88	4	5	9	10	16	2	0	2	2

== Awards and achievements ==
- Stanley Cup Championships (1930 & 1931)
- Honoured Member of the Manitoba Hockey Hall of Fame
