= Howie Morenz =

Canadian ice hockey player (1902–1937)

- Hockey Hall of Fame, 1945
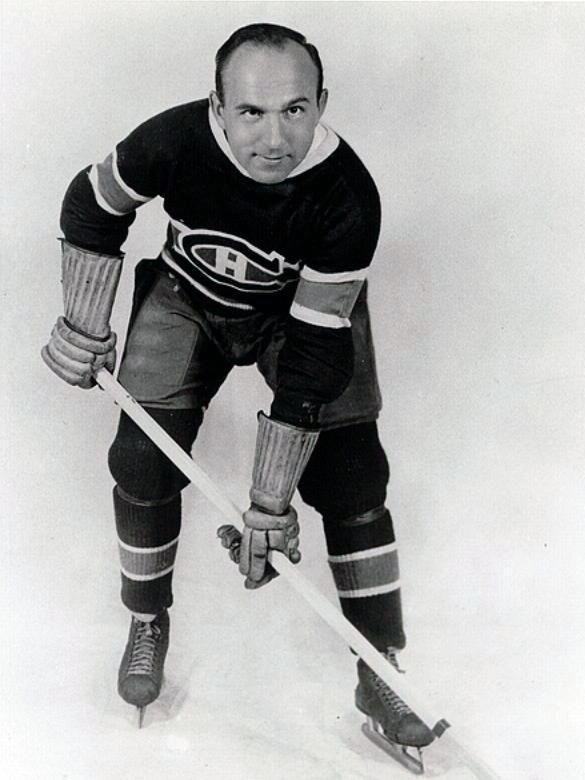
- Morenz, c. 1936–1937
- Born: September 21, 1902 Mitchell, Ontario, Canada
- Died: March 8, 1937 (aged 34) Montreal, Quebec, Canada
- Height: 5 ft 9 in (175 cm)
- Weight: 165 lb (75 kg; 11 st 11 lb)
- Position: Centre
- Shot: Left
- Played for: Montreal Canadiens; Chicago Black Hawks; New York Rangers
- Playing career: 1923–1937

Howard William Morenz (September 21, 1902 – March 8, 1937) was a Canadian professional ice hockey player. Beginning in 1923, he played centre for three National Hockey League (NHL) teams: the Montreal Canadiens (in two stints), the Chicago Black Hawks, and the New York Rangers. Before joining the NHL, Morenz excelled in the junior Ontario Hockey Association, where his team played for the Memorial Cup, the championship for junior ice hockey in Canada. In the NHL, he was one of the most dominant players in the league and set several league scoring records. A strong skater, Morenz was referred to as the "Stratford Streak" and "Mitchell Meteor" in reference to his speed on the ice.

Considered one of the first stars of the NHL, Morenz played 14 seasons in the league. He was a member of a Stanley Cup–winning team three times, all with the Canadiens. During his NHL career he placed in the top 10 leading scorers ten times. For seven straight seasons, Morenz led the Canadiens in both goals scored and points. He was named the winner of the Hart Trophy as the most valuable player of the league three times, and he led the league once in goals scored and twice in points scored. After the introduction of All-Star teams in 1931, he was named to the NHL first All-Star team twice and the NHL second All-Star team once.

Morenz died from complications of a broken leg, an injury he suffered in a game. After his death, the Canadiens retired his jersey number, the first time the team had done so for any player. When the Hockey Hall of Fame opened in 1945, Morenz was one of the original nine inductees. In 1950, the Canadian Press named him the best ice hockey player of the first half of the 20th century, and in 2017 the NHL included him on their list of the 100 greatest players in league history.

== Personal life ==
Born in Mitchell, Ontario to William Frederick Morenz and Rosena (Rose) Pauli, Howie Morenz had three sisters, Freda, Erma and Gertrude, and two brothers, Wilfred and Ezra. Morenz learned his hockey by playing shinny on the Thames River. At the age of eight, he played his first organized game as a goaltender, where he allowed 21 goals in a game. After that game, a coach switched Morenz to rover. Starting the 1916–17 junior season as a goaltender, Morenz became a forward when it became apparent his speed was much more suitable for an offensive role, and he helped the Mitchell ice hockey team win the Western Ontario junior championship. After the Morenz family moved to the nearby community of Stratford in May 1917, Morenz tried enlisting in the Canadian military but was refused when recruiters learned he was only 15 years old.

At the age of 18, Morenz became an apprentice with the Canadian National Railways (CNR) factory in Stratford. When not playing hockey, Morenz bet avidly on horse races and played the ukulele. In 1926 he married Mary McKay; together, they had three children: Howie Jr. in 1927 (d. 2015), Donald in 1933 (d. 1939), and Marlene in 1934 (d. March 2, 2018). Marlene later married Bernie Geoffrion, who played for both the Canadiens and Rangers from 1950 to 1968. Their son, Morenz's grandson Dan, played for the Canadiens in 1979–80. Dan's son, Blake, played with the University of Wisconsin and won the Hobey Baker Award as best collegiate player in 2010. Selected in the 2006 NHL entry draft by the Nashville Predators, he made his debut with the Predators in 2011, becoming the first fourth-generation NHL player. Blake was traded to Montreal in 2012, meaning that all four generations of the Morenz-Geoffrion family have played within the Canadiens organization.

== Playing career ==
=== Early career ===
In 1920 Morenz joined the Stratford Midgets junior team (under 20 years old), leading the Ontario Hockey Association (OHA) in assists and points during the 1920–21 regular season, and goals, assists and points in the playoffs. The Midgets won the league title and played in the 1921 Memorial Cup against the Winnipeg Falcons. While Morenz scored a hat trick (three goals) in the second game in the series, the Midgets lost the total-goals series 11–9. His performance in the Memorial Cup tournament earned him an invitation to play for the Stratford Indians, a senior league team, for the 1921–22 season. While he joined the Indians, he continued to play for the juniors as well. During the playoffs, he led both leagues in goals, assists, and points and he also led the senior league in penalty minutes. Playing exclusively in the senior league in the 1922–23 season, he led it in regular season assists, playoff goals, points, and penalty minutes.

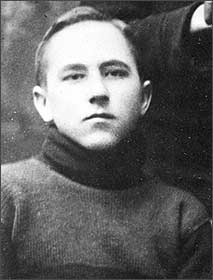
Morenz while playing junior ice hockey

During a CNR hockey tournament held in December 1922 in Montreal, Morenz scored nine goals in a game for Stratford. A friend of Léo Dandurand, the owner of the Montreal Canadiens of the National Hockey League, refereed the game and told Dandurand how good Morenz was. Dandurand went to Stratford in January 1923 to watch Morenz play, and decided he wanted to sign him to the Canadiens. In April he met with William Morenz, because at the age of 20, Howie was still legally a minor. William told Dandurand that he wanted Howie to finish his apprenticeship at the CNR factory, which would take another two years. However, in July Dandurand learned that Morenz and his father had been in contact with the Toronto St. Patricks, a rival team in the NHL. Fearing that Morenz would sign in Toronto, Dandurand sent his friend, Cecil Hart, to Stratford with instructions to sign Morenz at any cost. On July 7, 1923, Morenz signed a contract with the Canadiens for three years with a salary of $3,500 per year and a $1,000 signing bonus, a considerable amount for a first-year professional.

Right after signing the contract with the Canadiens, Morenz began to reconsider joining them. Stratford residents, as well as his senior team, wanted him to stay, and Morenz yielded to the pressure. He wrote a letter in August to Dandurand, explaining that he could not leave Stratford, and included the cheque given to him as a signing bonus. After receiving the letter, Dandurand phoned Morenz and told him to come to Montreal to talk in person. In Montreal, Morenz began explaining his reasons for not signing to Dandurand but began crying and could not finish. In response, Dandurand falsely threatened that if Morenz did not join the Canadiens, his professional hockey career would be over. Hearing this, Morenz relented and agreed to report to the Canadiens' training camp later in the year.

=== Montreal Canadiens (1923–34) ===
On December 3, 1923, Morenz arrived at his first Canadiens training camp and quickly impressed his new teammates. He made his NHL debut on December 26, 1923, in Ottawa against the Ottawa Senators, scoring a goal. At the conclusion of the 1923–24 season, Morenz's first in the NHL, he finished with 13 goals and 3 assists in 24 games. Finishing first in the league for the first time in five years, the Canadiens faced the Senators in the playoffs for the NHL championship. In the first game of the two-game, total-goals series, Morenz scored the only goal, and added another goal in the second game as the Canadiens won the series, five goals to two. As the champions of the NHL, the Canadiens played two teams from Western Canada for the Stanley Cup. They defeated the Vancouver Maroons of the Pacific Coast Hockey Association (PCHA) in two games of a best-of-three series and then faced the Calgary Tigers of the Western Canada Hockey League (WCHL). In the first game against Calgary, Morenz scored a hat trick as the Canadiens won by a score of 6–1. He scored another goal in the second game, as Montreal defeated the Tigers 3–0 to win their second Stanley Cup championship and Morenz's first with the team.

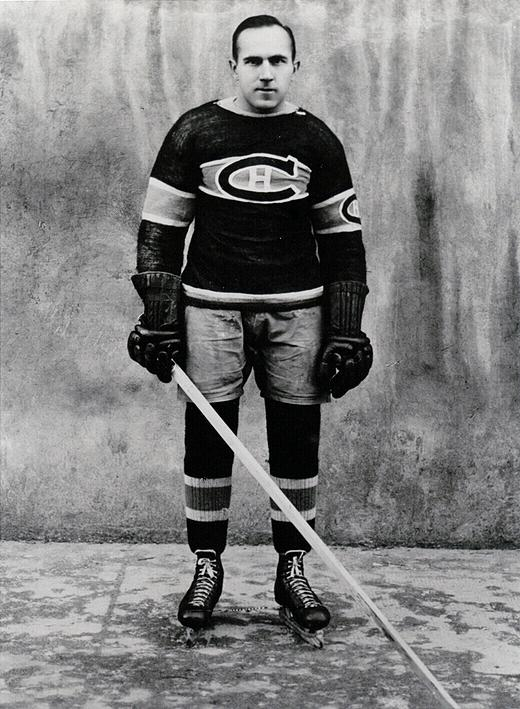
Morenz posing for a photo after the Canadiens won the 1930 Stanley Cup

The following season, Morenz scored 28 goals and had 11 assists for 39 points, placing second on the Canadiens and fourth in the NHL in scoring. That was followed with seven goals and eight points in six playoff games, as Montreal lost in the Stanley Cup Final to the Victoria Cougars of the WCHL. Morenz tied with linemate Aurèle Joliat in leading the Canadiens in scoring in 1925–26 with 26 points, finishing fifth in the league. In 1926–27 he finished third in the league in goals, with 25, and points, with 32, to again lead the Canadiens. The one goal he scored in four playoff games was a series winner in the quarter-finals, eliminating the Montreal Maroons from postseason contention.

The 1927–28 season was one of Morenz's best in the NHL. On March 24, 1928, in the final game of the regular season, Morenz earned two assists, tying the then-NHL record for assists in a season with 18 and becoming the first player to reach 50 points in a season, finishing with 51. As the league leader in goals, with 33, assists and points, Morenz was named the recipient of the Hart Trophy as the league's most valuable player. Though his scoring totals went down in 1928–29, with 17 goals and 27 points, Morenz still led the Canadiens in scoring, and tied for third overall in the league.

In 1929–30 Morenz finished seventh in the league for scoring with 50 points, including scoring 40 goals for the first time; this included a game against the New York Americans on March 18, 1930, in which he scored five goals. In the playoffs, he added another three goals, including his second Stanley Cup-winning goal, as the Canadiens beat the Boston Bruins for their third Stanley Cup. In the 1930–31 season, Morenz scored 28 goals and matched his career high with 51 points, winning his second NHL scoring title, and being awarded the Hart Trophy for the second time. He was also named to the newly created NHL All-Star team, being selected as the first-team centre, as the top player in that position. In the playoffs, the Canadiens reached the Stanley Cup Final for the second consecutive year, playing the Chicago Black Hawks. Playing with an injured shoulder and being held back by the Black Hawks, Morenz only scored one goal throughout ten playoff games, the final goal of the playoffs, as he won his third Stanley Cup with the Canadiens.

The 1931–32 season was another productive season for Morenz. With 49 points he finished third in league scoring, and became the first player in NHL history to win the Hart Trophy for a third time, also being named to the first All-Star team again. In a March 17, 1932, game against the New York Americans, Morenz scored his 334th point with an assist, passing Cy Denneny as the NHL record holder for career points. Minor injuries led to Morenz's point totals going down the following season as he finished second on the Canadiens in scoring behind Joliat, the first time in seven years he did not lead the Canadiens, ending up 10th in the league with 35 points. In the playoffs, he had three assists in two games. The 1933–34 season also saw Morenz's goal and point totals fall, to 8 goals and 21 points. Even with his decline in scoring, he still managed to reach a significant milestone, once again passing Cy Denneny to do so. Against the Detroit Red Wings on December 23, 1933, he scored his 249th career goal, to become the NHL leader for career goals. On January 2, 1934, Morenz twisted his ankle in a game in New York, bruising the bone and tearing ligaments. It was the first serious injury of his career, and he was unable to play for a month. After returning to the team, Morenz was unable to play at his previous level, and the Canadiens' fans began booing him.

With the decline in production, reports of the Canadiens wanting to trade Morenz began appearing in Montreal newspapers. When the Canadiens began their playoff series against the Chicago Black Hawks, the Canadiens' general manager, Léo Dandurand, confirmed that several teams wanted to acquire Morenz. After playing the first game with his usual speed and skill, Morenz broke his thumb in the second game, finishing with a goal and an assist for the playoffs.

After the playoffs, Morenz addressed the trade rumours, telling a reporter that he would only play for the Canadiens, saying that "when I can't play for them, I'll never put on a skate again," though the Canadiens' management knew he was too passionate about hockey to quit. During the summer of 1934, Morenz became concerned about his future with the team. Newspapers continued to write that Morenz would be involved in a trade involving several players and teams. Adding to Morenz's concern was the lack of response from either of the Canadiens' owners, Léo Dandurand or Joe Cattarinich, informing him of what was happening. The rumours ended on October 3, 1934, when Morenz was traded along with goaltender Lorne Chabot and defenceman Marty Burke, to the Chicago Black Hawks for forwards Leroy Goldsworthy and Lionel Conacher, and defenceman Roger Jenkins.

=== Chicago, New York and Montreal (1934–37) ===
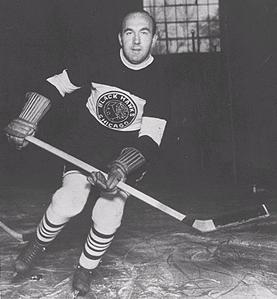
Morenz with the Chicago Black Hawks during the 1934–35 season.

In his first season with the Black Hawks, 1934–35, Morenz played in all 48 games for the team, scoring 8 goals and 34 points, an improvement over the previous season. The Black Hawks reached the playoffs, though Morenz was held pointless in the two games played. The following season was not as good for Morenz. He did not feel comfortable in Chicago, and was being benched, playing fewer minutes than he was used to. After 23 games with the Black Hawks, in which he scored 15 points, Morenz was traded for the second time in his career; he was sent to the New York Rangers on January 26, 1936, for forward Glen Brydson. Playing 19 games for the Rangers, Morenz scored 2 goals and had another 4 assists for 6 points, giving him 21 points over the season.

Over the summer of 1936, the Canadiens re-hired Cecil Hart to be the coach of the team. Hart agreed to the job on one condition: that the Canadiens bring Morenz back to the team. On September 1, 1936, Morenz once again joined the Canadiens, his contract being purchased by the team from the Rangers. The Canadiens spent most of the 1936–37 season as one of the best teams in the NHL; Morenz contributed regularly, occasionally showing the speed that had made him notable at the start of his career. By mid-January, he had 4 goals and 20 points, far better totals than previous years.

==== Final game and death ====
The Canadiens played the Chicago Black Hawks in Montreal on January 28, 1937. In the first period, Morenz went after the puck in the Chicago end while being chased by Black Hawks defenceman Earl Seibert. Morenz lost his balance and fell to the ice, crashing into the boards and catching his left skate in the wooden siding. Seibert, unable to stop, landed on him with full force. The resulting impact snapped Morenz's left leg, creating a noise heard throughout the rink. Helped to the Canadiens bench by his teammates, Morenz was taken to Hôpital St-Luc, where it was found that his leg was fractured in four places. Hart was initially hopeful that Morenz could return after six weeks, but after learning of the severity of the injury conceded that Morenz would not be able to play the rest of the season.

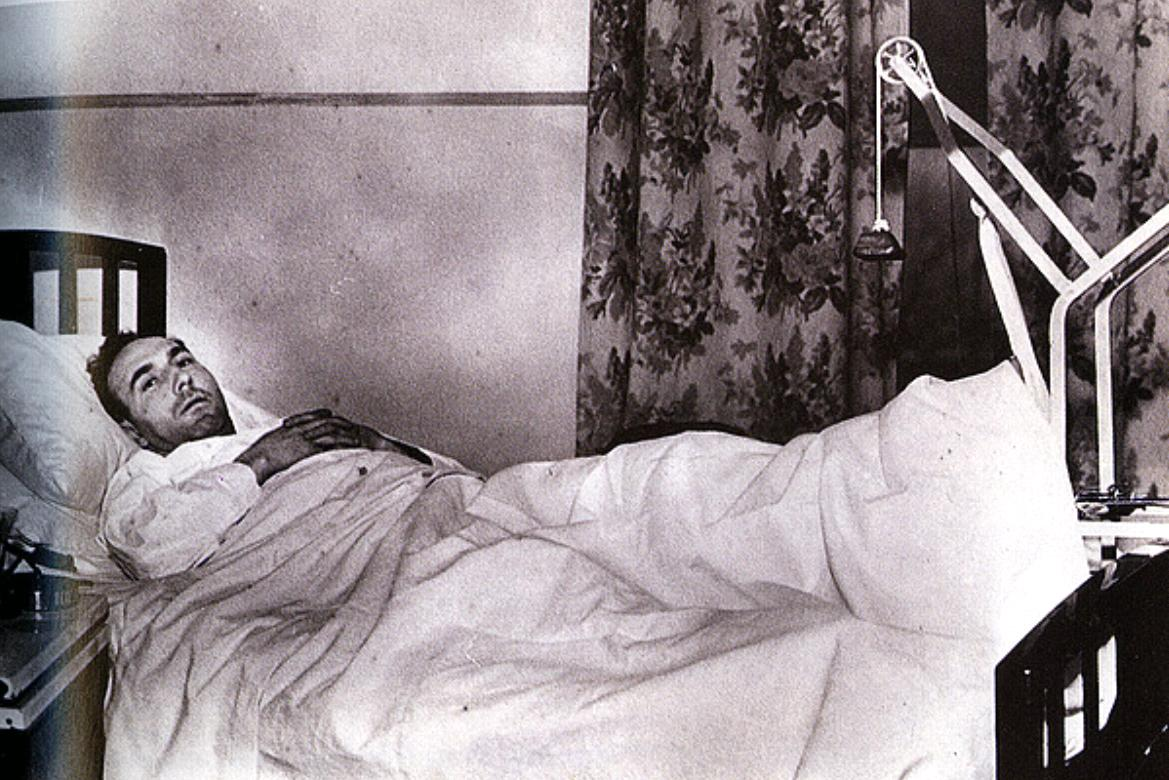
After breaking his leg, Morenz was unable to move from his hospital bed.

While recovering in the hospital, Morenz received many get-well cards and visits from his teammates and players from other NHL teams. There were so many of them who brought drinks that a teammate remarked that "the whisky was on the dresser and the beer was under the bed." Though there were many visitors, Morenz often found himself alone in the hospital room, unable to move off his bed. To pass the time, he read newspapers to stay up to date with the Canadiens as they finished the season. Since his injury, the team had dropped in the standings, causing Morenz to worry. He began to think he would never play hockey again and became depressed.

The Canadiens' team doctor, Dr. J.A. Hector Forgues, visited Morenz in late February and determined that he had suffered a nervous breakdown. To help Morenz, Dr. Forgues banned all visitors to his room, except for family and Canadiens officials. Mary, Morenz's wife, and their oldest son, Howie Jr., visited on most days, and William Morenz, his father, travelled from Stratford during the first week of March and stayed through March 5. On March 8, Morenz began complaining of chest pains, which doctors attributed to a heart attack. Mary Morenz and Cecil Hart were called to the hospital; around 11:30 pm, Morenz tried to get out of bed to use the washroom but collapsed on the floor and died from a coronary embolism caused by blood clots from his damaged leg, minutes before his wife and coach arrived. He was 34.

The Canadiens were scheduled to play the Montreal Maroons the evening of March 9, a game the NHL offered to cancel in honour of Morenz's death. However Mary insisted the game be played, saying that Morenz would have wanted the game to continue. The players on the Canadiens and Maroons wore black armbands for the game, and prior to the start, two minutes of silence were observed in his honour. A similar event happened in New York, where the New York Rangers and New York Americans had a moment of silence before the start of their game.

A funeral was held on March 11, at the Montreal Forum, the arena where the Canadiens played. Fans were allowed to file past the casket, laid at centre ice, and 50,000 people paid their respects. A rotating guard of honour of four Canadiens stood around the casket which was covered in flowers including a large wreath from Aurèle Joliat that was shaped like the number 7, Morenz's number, and a note from Morenz's three children. The entire service was broadcast on the radio, and after its conclusion he was buried in Mount Royal Cemetery in Montreal.

== Legacy ==
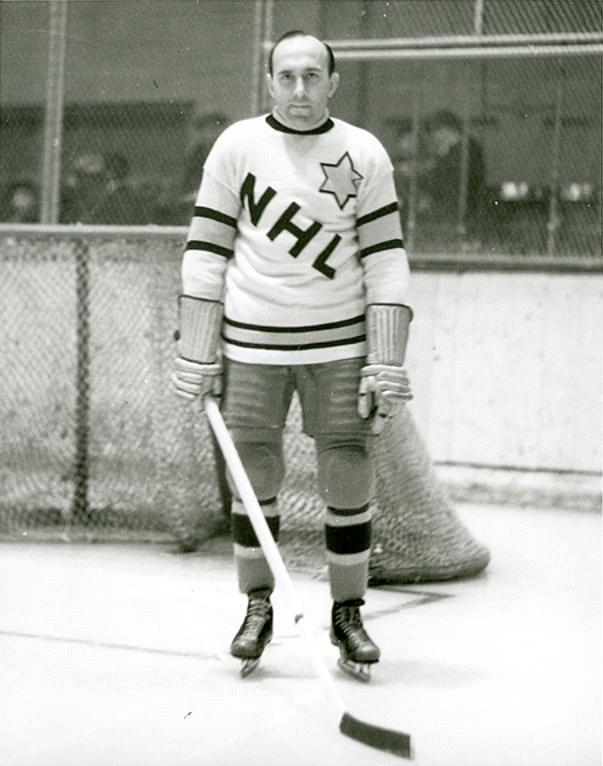
Morenz at the first NHL All-Star Game in 1934 in benefit of Ace Bailey. The second All-Star Game was held in his honour.

The city of Montreal mourned the death of Morenz for months. To honour him, the Canadiens retired his jersey number, 7, on November 2, 1937, the first time the team honoured a player in that fashion. This was prior to a benefit all-star game held at the Forum to raise money for the Morenz family. A team composed of players from the Canadiens and Maroons was defeated 6–5 by a team of players from the other NHL teams.

One of the most skilled players in the early NHL, Morenz led the Canadiens in both goals and points from 1926 until 1932, though he tied with Aurèle Joliat for points in 1926. At the time of his death, he had set an NHL record for most career points with 472. When the Hockey Hall of Fame was established in 1945, he was among the first group of nine inductees. A 1950 Canadian Press poll named Morenz the best ice hockey player of the first half of the 20th century. In 1998 he was ranked 15th on The Hockey News' list of the 100 Greatest Hockey Players. When the NHL announced its 100 greatest players in conjunction with the league's centennial in 2017, Morenz was included on the list.

Through his exciting play, Morenz encouraged the expansion of the NHL, helping bring professional hockey to the United States. Watching Morenz play during the 1924 Stanley Cup Final between Montreal and Calgary, Morenz's first season in the NHL, Charles Adams, the owner of a chain of grocery stores, went back to Boston wanting a hockey team based in the city. That summer, the NHL granted Adams a franchise for the following season, the Boston Bruins. Boxing promoter Tex Rickard, owner of Madison Square Garden, also saw Morenz play early in his career and agreed to add ice to his building for an NHL team known as the New York Americans. As part of the agreement, Morenz and the Canadiens played the first game against the Americans on December 15, 1925.

Morenz's daughter Marlene married Bernie Geoffrion, who also played for the Canadiens and Rangers, and was later inducted into the Hockey Hall of Fame. When the Canadiens retired Geoffrion's number 5 on the night of his death on March 11, 2006, the team recognized the link between the two men. As Geoffrion's banner was being raised to the rafters of the Bell Centre, the banner for Morenz's number 7 was lowered halfway to the ice. Once Geoffrion's banner reached Morenz's banner, the two were raised together.

== Career statistics ==
=== Regular season and playoffs ===
			Regular season					Playoffs
Season	Team	League	GP	G	A	Pts	PIM	GP	G	A	Pts	PIM
1919–20	Stratford Midgets	OHA-Jr.	5	14	4	18	—	7	14	12	26	—
1920–21	Stratford Midgets	OHA-Jr.	8	19	12	31	—	13	38	18	56	—
1921–22	Stratford Midgets	OHA-Jr.	4	17	6	23	10	5	17	4	21	—
1921–22	Stratford Indians	OHA-Sr.	4	10	3	13	2	8	15	8	23	21
1922–23	Stratford Indians	OHA-Sr.	10	15	13	28	19	10	28	7	35	36
1923–24	Montreal Canadiens	NHL	24	13	3	16	20	2	3	1	4	6
1923–24	Montreal Canadiens	St-Cup	—	—	—	—	—	4	4	2	6	4
1924–25	Montreal Canadiens	NHL	30	27	12	39	46	2	3	0	3	4
1924–25	Montreal Canadiens	St-Cup	—	—	—	—	—	4	4	1	5	4
1925–26	Montreal Canadiens	NHL	31	23	3	26	39	—	—	—	—	—
1926–27	Montreal Canadiens	NHL	44	25	7	32	49	4	1	0	1	4
1927–28	Montreal Canadiens	NHL	43	33	18	51	66	2	0	0	0	12
1928–29	Montreal Canadiens	NHL	42	17	10	27	47	3	0	0	0	6
1929–30	Montreal Canadiens	NHL	44	40	10	50	72	6	3	0	3	10
1930–31	Montreal Canadiens	NHL	39	28	23	51	49	10	1	4	5	10
1931–32	Montreal Canadiens	NHL	48	24	25	49	46	4	1	0	1	4
1932–33	Montreal Canadiens	NHL	46	14	21	35	32	2	0	3	3	2
1933–34	Montreal Canadiens	NHL	39	8	13	21	21	2	1	1	2	0
1934–35	Chicago Black Hawks	NHL	48	8	26	34	21	2	0	0	0	0
1935–36	Chicago Black Hawks	NHL	23	4	11	15	20	—	—	—	—	—
1935–36	New York Rangers	NHL	19	2	4	6	6	—	—	—	—	—
1936–37	Montreal Canadiens	NHL	30	4	16	20	12	—	—	—	—	—
NHL totals			550	271	201	472	546	39	13	9	22	58

- All statistics are taken from NHL.com.

== Awards ==
=== NHL ===
Award	Year(s)
Stanley Cup champion	1924, 1930, 1931
Top Scorer	1928, 1931
Hart Memorial Trophy	1928, 1931, 1932
First All-Star team Centre	1931, 1932
Second All-Star team Centre	1933

== See also ==
- List of ice hockey players who died during their playing career
- List of National Hockey League retired numbers
- List of players with five or more goals in an NHL game

== Notes ==
Awards and achievements
Preceded by Herb Gardiner	Winner of the Hart Trophy; 1928	Succeeded by Roy Worters
Preceded by Bill Cook	NHL Goal Leader; 1928	Succeeded by Ace Bailey
Preceded by Bill Cook	NHL Scoring Champion; 1928	Succeeded by Ace Bailey
Preceded by Cooney Weiland	NHL Scoring Champion; 1931	Succeeded by Harvey Jackson
Preceded by Nels Stewart	Winner of the Hart Trophy; 1931, 1932	Succeeded by Eddie Shore
