= Gerald Carson =

Canadian ice hockey player

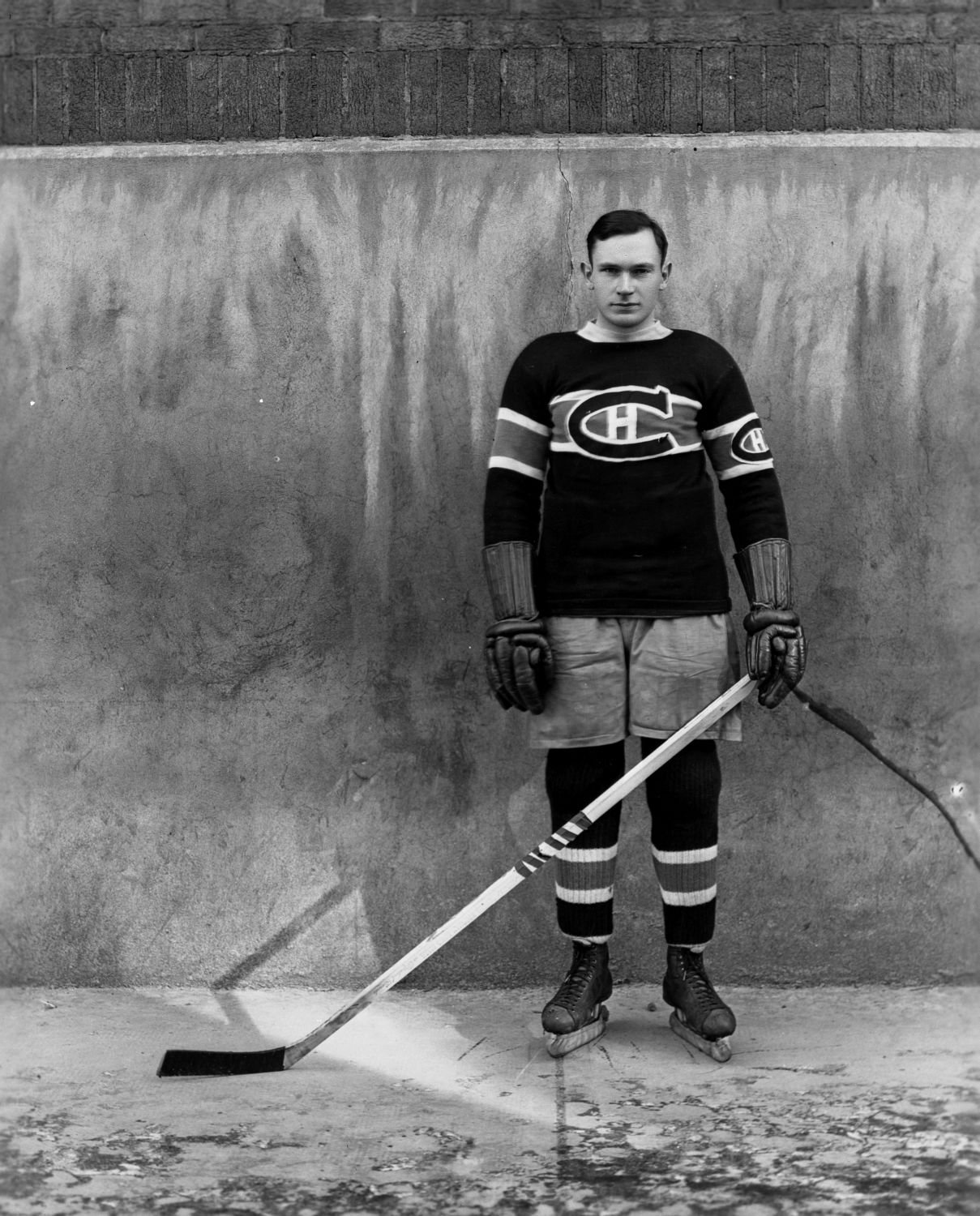
- Carson with the Montreal Canadiens
- Born: October 10, 1903 Parry Sound, Ontario, Canada
- Died: November 9, 1956 (aged 53)
- Height: 5 ft 10 in (178 cm)
- Weight: 175 lb (79 kg; 12 st 7 lb)
- Position: Defence
- Shot: Left
- Played for: Montreal Maroons; Montreal Canadiens; New York Rangers
- Playing career: 1923–1937

George Gerald "Gerry, Stub" Carson (October 10, 1903 — November 9, 1956) was a Canadian professional ice hockey defenceman who played 261 games in the National Hockey League (NHL) with the Montreal Canadiens and New York Rangers and Montreal Maroons between 1928 and 1937. He won the Stanley Cup with the Montreal Canadiens in 1930. His older brothers Frank and Bill also played in the NHL.

== Career statistics ==
=== Regular season and playoffs ===
			Regular season					Playoffs
Season	Team	League	GP	G	A	Pts	PIM	GP	G	A	Pts	PIM
1922–23	Woodstock Athletics	OHA	—	—	—	—	—	—	—	—	—	—
1923–24	Grimsby Peach Kings	OHA Sr	—	—	—	—	—	—	—	—	—	—
1924–25	Grimsby Peach Kings	OHA Sr	—	—	—	—	—	—	—	—	—	—
1925–26	Grimsby Peach Kings	OHA Sr	—	—	—	—	—	—	—	—	—	—
1926–27	Grimsby Peach Kings	OHA Sr	—	—	—	—	—	—	—	—	—	—
1927–28	Philadelphia Arrows	Can-Am	37	7	4	11	38	—	—	—	—	—
1928–29	Montreal Canadiens	NHL	31	0	0	0	2	—	—	—	—	—
1928–29	New York Rangers	NHL	8	0	0	0	5	5	0	0	0	0
1929–30	Montreal Canadiens	NHL	35	1	0	1	8	6	0	0	0	0
1929–30	Providence Reds	Can-Am	6	1	0	1	19	—	—	—	—	—
1930–31	Providence Reds	Can-Am	38	4	2	6	84	2	0	0	0	14
1931–32	Providence Reds	Can-Am	40	9	5	14	77	5	1	0	1	8
1932–33	Montreal Canadiens	NHL	48	5	2	7	53	2	0	0	0	2
1933–34	Montreal Canadiens	NHL	48	5	0	5	51	2	0	0	0	2
1934–35	Montreal Canadiens	NHL	48	0	5	5	56	2	0	0	0	4
1936–37	Montreal Maroons	NHL	42	1	3	4	28	5	0	0	0	4
NHL totals			260	12	10	22	203	22	0	0	0	12
