= Wildor Larochelle =

Canadian ice hockey player

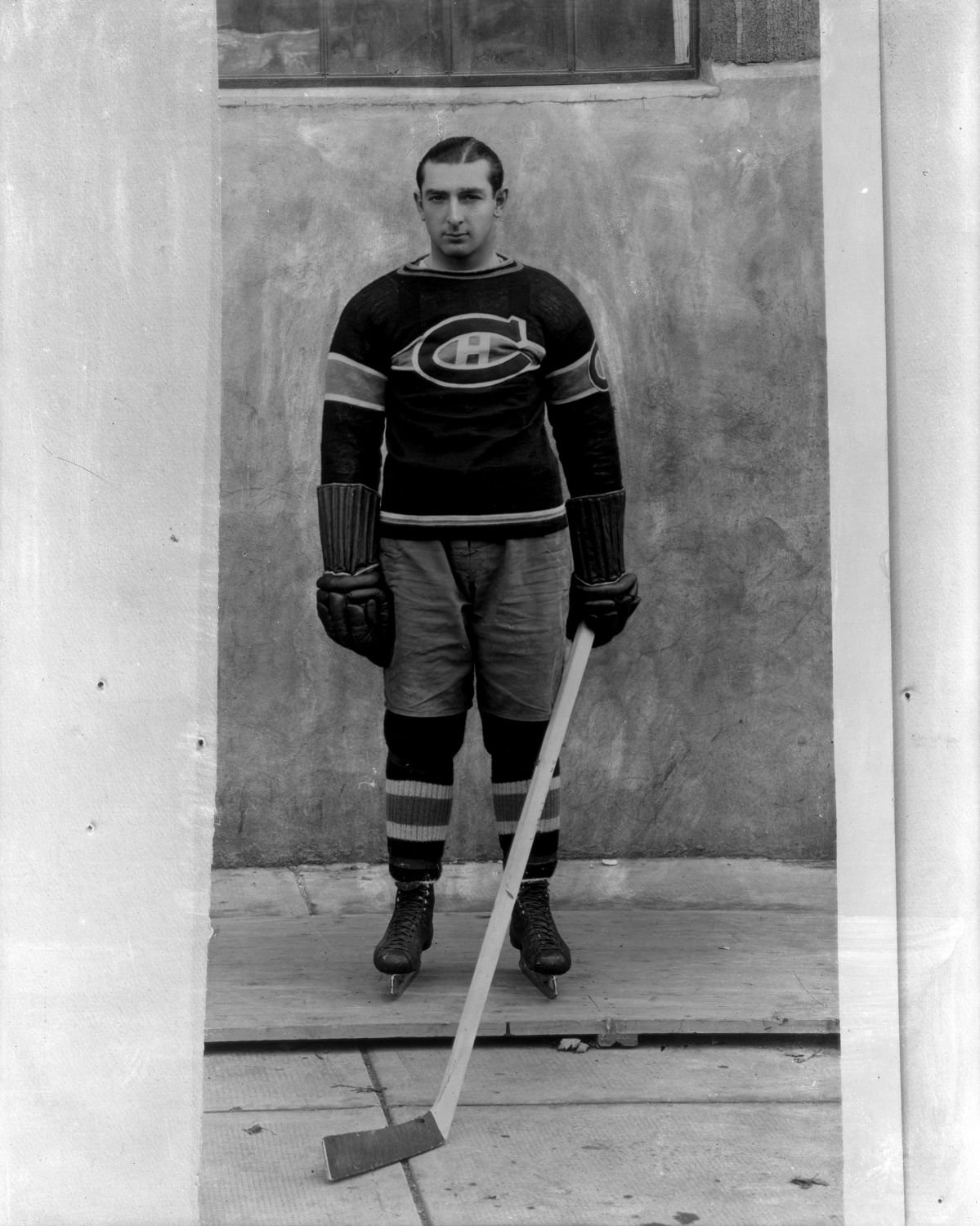
- Born: September 23, 1906 Sorel, Quebec, Canada
- Died: March 21, 1964 (aged 57)
- Height: 5 ft 8 in (173 cm)
- Weight: 158 lb (72 kg; 11 st 4 lb)
- Position: Right wing
- Shot: Right
- Played for: Montreal Canadiens; Chicago Black Hawks
- Playing career: 1925–1939

Joseph Omer Wildor Larochelle (September 23, 1906 in Sorel, Quebec – March 21, 1964) was a Canadian ice hockey forward. He played 475 games in the National Hockey League with the Montreal Canadiens and Chicago Black Hawks from 1925 to 1937. With Montreal he won the Stanley Cup in 1930 and 1931.

== Career statistics ==
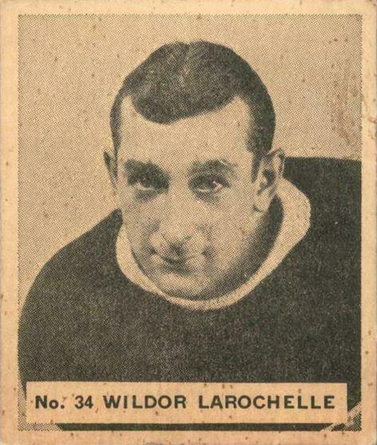
1937-38 card of Larochelle

=== Regular season and playoffs ===
			Regular season					Playoffs
Season	Team	League	GP	G	A	Pts	PIM	GP	G	A	Pts	PIM
1925–26	Montreal Canadiens	NHL	33	2	1	3	10	—	—	—	—	—
1926–27	Montreal Canadiens	NHL	41	0	1	1	6	4	0	0	0	0
1927–28	Montreal Canadiens	NHL	41	3	1	4	32	2	0	0	0	0
1928–29	Montreal Canadiens	NHL	2	0	0	0	0	—	—	—	—	—
1928–29	Providence Reds	Can-Am	39	8	4	12	50	6	0	1	1	8
1929–30	Montreal Canadiens	NHL	44	14	12	26	28	6	1	0	1	12
1930–31	Montreal Canadiens	NHL	40	8	5	13	35	10	1	2	3	8
1931–32	Montreal Canadiens	NHL	48	18	8	26	16	4	2	1	3	4
1932–33	Montreal Canadiens	NHL	47	11	4	15	27	2	1	0	1	0
1933–34	Montreal Canadiens	NHL	48	16	11	27	27	2	1	1	2	0
1934–35	Montreal Canadiens	NHL	48	9	19	28	12	2	0	0	0	0
1935–36	Montreal Canadiens	NHL	13	0	1	1	6	—	—	—	—	—
1935–36	Chicago Black Hawks	NHL	27	2	2	4	8	2	0	0	0	0
1935–36	Philadelphia Ramblers	Can-Am	6	2	3	5	0	—	—	—	—	—
1936–37	Chicago Black Hawks	NHL	43	9	10	19	6	—	—	—	—	—
1938–39	New Haven Eagles	IAHL	21	2	3	5	2	—	—	—	—	—
NHL totals			475	92	75	167	213	34	6	4	10	24
