= Bill Carson (ice hockey) =

Canadian ice hockey player (1899–1967)

- Born: November 25, 1899 Bracebridge, Ontario, Canada
- Died: May 29, 1967 (aged 67)
- Height: 5 ft 8 in (173 cm)
- Weight: 158 lb (72 kg; 11 st 4 lb)
- Position: Right wing
- Shot: Left
- Played for: Toronto St. Patricks; Toronto Maple Leafs; Boston Bruins
- Playing career: 1926–1930

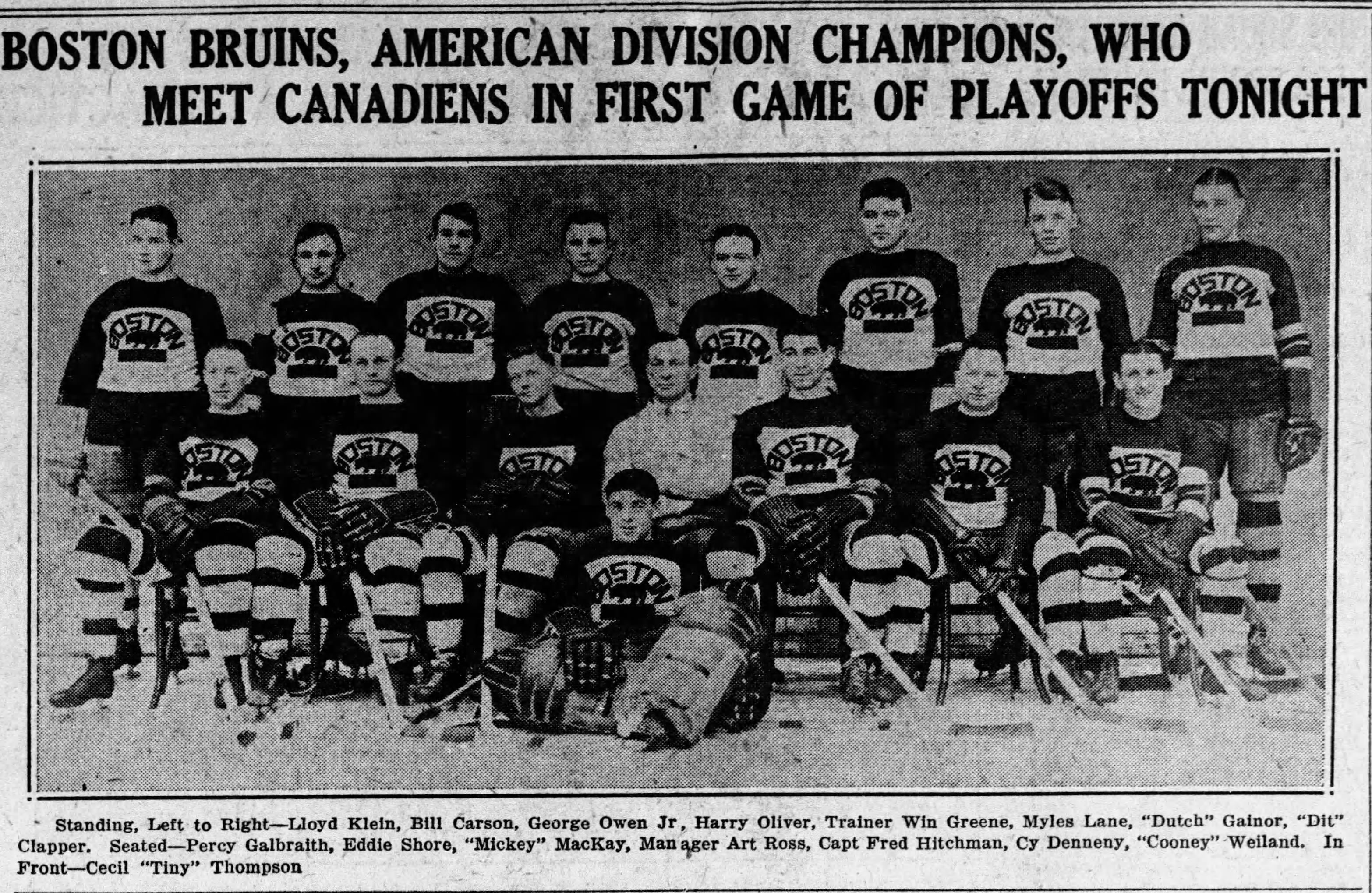
1928 Boston Bruins, Bill Carson stands second from the left in the back

William Joseph James "Doc" Carson (November 25, 1899 – May 29, 1967) was a Canadian professional ice hockey forward who played 159 games in the National Hockey League between 1926 and 1930. Born in Bracebridge, Ontario, he played for the Toronto Maple Leafs and Boston Bruins. He won the Stanley Cup in 1929 with the Boston Bruins, scoring the game-winning goal in the team's 2-1 win at Madison Square Garden against the New York Rangers. Bill was one of three Carson brothers to play in the NHL, along with younger brothers Gerry and Frank.

In 2003, Bill Carson was inducted into the Bobby Orr Hall of Fame in Parry Sound.

== Career statistics ==
=== Regular season and playoffs ===
			Regular season					Playoffs
Season	Team	League	GP	G	A	Pts	PIM	GP	G	A	Pts	PIM
1918–19	Woodstock Athletics	OHA	—	—	—	—	—	—	—	—	—	—
1919–20	University of Toronto	OHA Sr	3	6	1	7	—	—	—	—	—	—
1919–20	University of Toronto	Al-Cup	—	—	—	—	—	9	9	4	13	—
1920–21	University of Toronto	OHA Sr	10	13	3	16	—	3	2	0	2	—
1920–21	University of Toronto	Al-Cup	—	—	—	—	—	8	14	2	16	—
1921–22	University of Toronto	OHA Sr	9	15	3	18	—	—	—	—	—	—
1922–23	University of Toronto	OHA Sr	11	8	10	18	—	—	—	—	—	—
1923–24	Grimbsy Peach Kings	OHS Sr	—	—	—	—	—	—	—	—	—	—
1923–24	Toronto Granites	Exhib	5	9	2	11	—	—	—	—	—	—
1924–25	Stratford Indians	OHA Sr	20	29	8	37	41	2	0	2	2	3
1925–26	Stratford Indians	OHA Sr	17	19	3	22	23	—	—	—	—	—
1926–27	Toronto St. Pats/Maple Leafs	NHL	40	16	6	22	41	—	—	—	—	—
1927–28	Toronto Maple Leafs	NHL	32	20	6	26	36	—	—	—	—	—
1928–29	Toronto Maple Leafs	NHL	24	7	6	13	45	—	—	—	—	—
1928–29	Boston Bruins	NHL	19	4	2	6	10	5	2	0	2	8
1929–30	Boston Bruins	NHL	44	7	4	11	24	6	1	0	1	6
1930–31	London Tecumsehs	OHL	7	0	1	1	2	—	—	—	—	—
1933–34	New Haven Eagles	Can-Am	33	7	4	11	6	—	—	—	—	—
NHL totals			159	54	24	78	156	11	3	0	3	14
