= Frank Carson (ice hockey) =

Canadian ice hockey player

- Born: January 12, 1902 Bracebridge, Ontario, Canada
- Died: April 21, 1957 (aged 55) Crumlin, Ontario, Canada
- Height: 5 ft 7 in (170 cm)
- Weight: 165 lb (75 kg; 11 st 11 lb)
- Position: Right wing
- Shot: Right
- Played for: Montreal Maroons; New York Americans; Detroit Falcons; Detroit Red Wings
- Playing career: 1926–1934

Reginald Francis Carson (January 12, 1902 – April 21, 1957) was a National Hockey League forward from 1926 to 1934. He was born in Bracebridge, Ontario. Frank was one of three Carson brothers to play in the NHL, along with younger brother Gerry and older brother Bill. He won a Stanley Cup championship in 1926 with the Montreal Maroons. After the 1929-30 season he was sold to the New York Americans, along with Mike Neville, Red Dutton, and Hap Emms for $35,000. With the latter he was traded to the Detroit Falcons during the 1931-32 season. He retired after 246 games, recording 42 goals and 48 assists for a total of 90 points.

== Career statistics ==
=== Regular season and playoffs ===
			Regular season					Playoffs
Season	Team	League	GP	G	A	Pts	PIM	GP	G	A	Pts	PIM
1918–19	Woodstock Athletics	OHA Jr	—	—	—	—	—	—	—	—	—	—
1919–20	Stratford Midgets	OHA Jr	5	10	8	18	—	6	16	11	27	—
1920–21	Stratford Midgets	OHA Jr	8	20	9	29	—	13	33	15	48	—
1921–22	Stratford Midgets	OHA Jr	4	10	5	15	6	4	9	3	12	—
1921–22	Stratford Indians	OHA Sr	4	7	2	9	2	8	8	4	12	16
1922–23	Stratford Indians	OHA Sr	10	21	9	30	8	9	13	10	23	20
1923–24	Stratford Indians	OHA Sr	12	19	10	29	14	2	3	2	5	0
1924–25	Stratford Indians	OHA Sr	20	18	8	26	38	2	2	0	2	4
1925–26	Stratford Indians	OHA Sr	12	6	6	12	16	—	—	—	—	—
1925–26	Montreal Maroons	NHL	16	2	1	3	6	4	0	0	0	0
1925–26	Montreal Maroons	St-Cup	—	—	—	—	—	4	0	0	0	0
1926–27	Montreal Maroons	NHL	44	2	3	5	12	2	0	0	0	2
1927–28	Montreal Maroons	NHL	21	0	1	1	10	9	0	0	0	0
1927–28	Stratford Nationals	Can-Pro	13	6	1	7	18	5	3	4	7	4
1928–29	Windsor Hornets	Can-Pro	41	17	12	29	60	8	4	1	5	18
1929–30	Windsor Bulldogs	IHL	41	31	14	45	65	—	—	—	—	—
1930–31	New York Americans	NHL	44	6	7	13	36	—	—	—	—	—
1931–32	New Haven Eagles	Can-Am	15	6	3	9	28	—	—	—	—	—
1931–32	Detroit Falcons	NHL	31	10	14	24	31	2	0	0	0	2
1932–33	Detroit Red Wings	NHL	45	12	13	25	35	4	0	1	1	0
1933–34	Detroit Red Wings	NHL	47	10	9	19	36	6	0	1	1	5
NHL totals			248	42	48	90	166	27	0	2	2	9
