= Albert Leduc =

Canadian ice hockey player

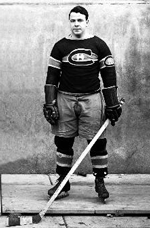
- Born: November 22, 1902 Valleyfield, Quebec, Canada
- Died: July 31, 1990 (aged 87) Montreal, Quebec, Canada
- Height: 5 ft 9 in (175 cm)
- Weight: 190 lb (86 kg; 13 st 8 lb)
- Position: Defence
- Shot: Right
- Played for: Montreal Canadiens; New York Rangers; Ottawa Senators
- Playing career: 1925–1937

Joseph Albert Florimond Leduc (November 22, 1902 – July 31, 1990) was a Canadian professional ice hockey defenceman. He played in the National Hockey League from 1925 to 1935. with the New York Rangers, Ottawa Senators, and Montreal Canadiens. He won Stanley Cup twice, in 1930, and 1931, both with Montreal.

== Career ==
Leduc played in the National Hockey League (NHL) from 1925 to 1935. During this period, he played for the New York Rangers, the Ottawa Senators and the Montreal Canadiens. He was part of the two Montreal Canadiens teams to win the Stanley Cup in 1930 and 1931.

Leduc played amateur hockey with the Collège de Valleyfield team.

== Personal ==
Leduc's grand nephew, Philippe Hudon, is an ice hockey player who was drafted by the Detroit Red Wings in the 5th round of the 2011 NHL entry draft.

== Career statistics ==
=== Regular season and playoffs ===
| | | | Regular season | | | | | Playoffs |
| Season | Team | League | GP | G | A | Pts | PIM | GP | G | A | Pts | PIM |
|---|---|---|---|---|---|---|---|---|---|---|---|---|
| 1920–21 | Valleyfield Braves | MCHL | — | — | — | — | — | — | — | — | — | — |
| 1921–22 | Universite de Montreal | MCHL | — | — | — | — | — | — | — | — | — | — |
| 1922–23 | Quebec Aces | MCHL | — | — | — | — | — | — | — | — | — | — |
| 1923–24 | Montreal Voyageurs | QCHL | — | — | — | — | — | — | — | — | — | — |
| 1923–24 | Montreal Hochelaga | MCHL | 9 | 6 | 0 | 6 | 4 | — | — | — | — | — |
| 1924–25 | Montreal Nationale | MCHL | 11 | 9 | 0 | 9 | — | — | — | — | — | — |
| 1925–26 | Montreal Canadiens | NHL | 32 | 10 | 3 | 13 | 64 | — | — | — | — | — |
| 1926–27 | Montreal Canadiens | NHL | 43 | 5 | 2 | 7 | 60 | 4 | 0 | 0 | 0 | 2 |
| 1927–28 | Montreal Canadiens | NHL | 42 | 8 | 5 | 13 | 75 | 2 | 1 | 0 | 1 | 5 |
| 1928–29 | Montreal Canadiens | NHL | 43 | 9 | 2 | 11 | 79 | 3 | 1 | 0 | 1 | 4 |
| 1929–30 | Montreal Canadiens | NHL | 44 | 6 | 9 | 15 | 94 | 6 | 1 | 3 | 4 | 8 |
| 1930–31 | Montreal Canadiens | NHL | 44 | 8 | 6 | 14 | 84 | 6 | 0 | 2 | 2 | 9 |
| 1931–32 | Montreal Canadiens | NHL | 41 | 5 | 3 | 8 | 60 | 4 | 1 | 1 | 2 | 2 |
| 1932–33 | Montreal Canadiens | NHL | 48 | 5 | 3 | 8 | 62 | 2 | 1 | 0 | 1 | 2 |
| 1933–34 | Ottawa Senators | NHL | 35 | 1 | 3 | 4 | 34 | — | — | — | — | — |
| 1933–34 | New York Rangers | NHL | 7 | 0 | 0 | 0 | 6 | — | — | — | — | — |
| 1934–35 | Montreal Canadiens | NHL | 4 | 0 | 0 | 0 | 4 | — | — | — | — | — |
| 1934–35 | Quebec Castors | Can-Am | 41 | 12 | 14 | 26 | 53 | 3 | 0 | 0 | 0 | 13 |
| 1935–36 | Providence Reds | Can-Am | 48 | 5 | 15 | 20 | 82 | 7 | 2 | 2 | 4 | 8 |
| 1936–37 | Providence Reds | IAHL | 38 | 2 | 8 | 10 | 48 | 3 | 0 | 2 | 2 | 2 |
| NHL totals | | | 383 | 57 | 36 | 93 | 622 | 27 | 5 | 6 | 11 | 32 |
