= Georges Mantha =

Canadian ice hockey player

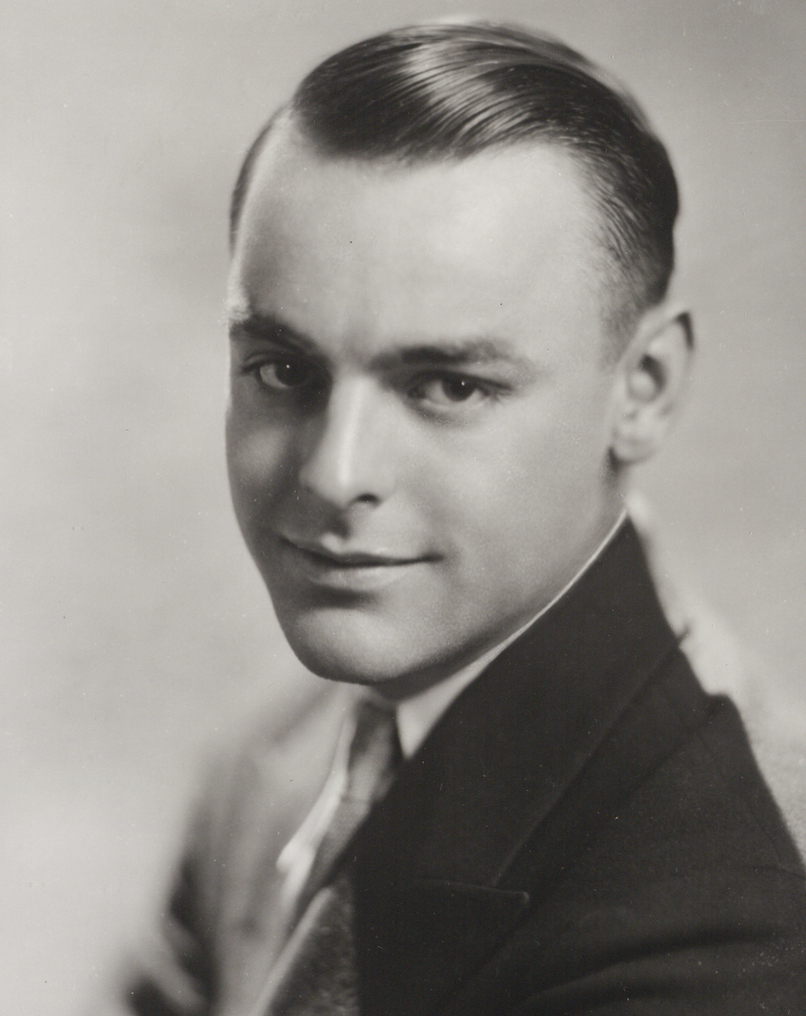
- Born: November 29, 1907 Lachine, Quebec, Canada
- Died: January 25, 1990 (aged 82)
- Height: 5 ft 8 in (173 cm)
- Weight: 165 lb (75 kg; 11 st 11 lb)
- Position: Defence/Left Wing
- Shot: Left
- Played for: Montreal Canadiens
- Playing career: 1928–1943

Joseph Georges Leon Mantha (November 29, 1907 – January 25, 1990) was a Canadian ice hockey forward born in Lachine, Quebec.

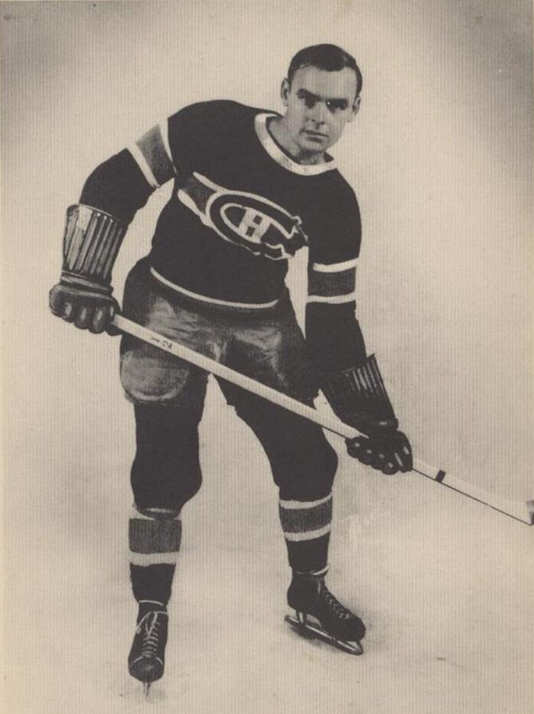

Mantha played in the National Hockey League with the Montreal Canadiens. His career lasted from 1928 to 1941. His brother Sylvio Mantha also played in the NHL. Mantha would win the Stanley Cup twice in his career, in 1930 and 1931.

== Career statistics ==
			Regular season					Playoffs
Season	Team	League	GP	G	A	Pts	PIM	GP	G	A	Pts	PIM
1928–29	Montreal Canadiens	NHL	31	0	0	0	8	3	0	0	0	0
1929–30	Montreal Canadiens	NHL	44	5	2	7	16	6	0	0	0	8
1930–31	Montreal Canadiens	NHL	44	11	6	17	25	10	5	1	6	4
1931–32	Montreal Canadiens	NHL	48	1	7	8	8	4	0	0	0	2
1932–33	Montreal Canadiens	NHL	43	3	6	9	10	—	—	—	—	—
1933–34	Montreal Canadiens	NHL	44	6	9	15	12	—	—	—	—	—
1934–35	Montreal Canadiens	NHL	42	12	10	22	14	2	0	0	0	4
1935–36	Montreal Canadiens	NHL	35	1	12	13	14	—	—	—	—	—
1936–37	Montreal Canadiens	NHL	47	13	14	27	17	5	0	0	0	0
1937–38	Montreal Canadiens	NHL	47	23	19	42	12	3	1	0	1	0
1938–39	Montreal Canadiens	NHL	25	5	5	10	6	—	—	—	—	—
1939–40	Montreal Canadiens	NHL	42	9	11	20	6	—	—	—	—	—
1940–41	New Haven Eagles	AHL	49	16	15	31	8	—	—	—	—	—
1940–41	Montreal Canadiens	NHL	6	0	1	1	0	—	—	—	—	—
1941–42	Washington Lions	AHL	50	18	25	43	8	—	—	—	—	—
1942–43	Washington Lions	AHL	19	2	2	4	4	—	—	—	—	—
NHL totals			498	89	102	191	148	33	6	1	7	18
