= Sylvio Mantha =

Canadian ice hockey player (1902–1974)

- Hockey Hall of Fame, 1960
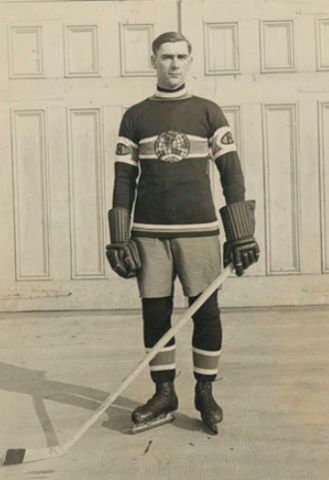
- Born: April 14, 1902 Montreal, Quebec, Canada
- Died: August 7, 1974 (aged 72) Montreal, Quebec, Canada
- Height: 5 ft 10 in (178 cm)
- Weight: 173 lb (78 kg; 12 st 5 lb)
- Position: Defence
- Shot: Right
- Played for: Montreal Canadiens; Boston Bruins
- Playing career: 1923–1937

Joseph Sylvio Theobald Mantha (April 14, 1902 – August 7, 1974) was a Canadian professional ice hockey defenceman who played fourteen seasons in the National Hockey League for the Montreal Canadiens and Boston Bruins. Elected to the Hockey Hall of Fame in 1960, he was regarded as one of the best two-way defencemen of his day.

== Amateur career ==
Mantha started as a right winger for the Notre Dame de Grace Juniors in 1919, before playing for Verdun in the Intermediate Mount Royal Hockey League, and Imperial Tobacco and Northern Electric in the Montreal industrial league. He played briefly for the Montreal Nationales in the Quebec league. After scoring four goals in nine games with the Nationales, he was signed by the Montreal Canadiens in December 1923.

== NHL career ==
The Canadiens started Mantha as a forward, then moved him to defence as part of a youth movement, because veteran Montreal defencemen Sprague Cleghorn and Billy Coutu were aging. He was used sparingly as a substitute that first season, but gained more ice time thereafter as an injury replacement for Coutu and as Cleghorn was suspended during the season. Mantha played more regularly in the playoffs, helping the Canadiens to the 1924 Stanley Cup championship.

When Cleghorn was traded just before the 1925–26 NHL season, Mantha gained a more prominent role. With the further trade of Coutu to Boston in the 1927 offseason, he was named captain of the team, and paired with Herb Gardiner—acquired with the breakup of the Western Hockey League from the Calgary Tigers—to become the new starting defencemen for the Canadiens. Mantha was injured in the playoffs that year, but recovered to score Montreal's only goal on an end-to-end rush in the deciding (and losing) game to the Ottawa Senators.

Newly paired with defenceman Battleship Leduc after Gardiner left to become player-coach in Chicago, Mantha scored the first-ever goal in Boston Garden on November 20, 1928, leading the Canadiens to a 1–0 win over the Boston Bruins. Mantha also got to play with his brother Georges that season, a rookie forward signed by Montreal. By the end of the season, Mantha was paired on defence with Marty Burke, a partnership that would last for several seasons.

The 1929–30 saw Montreal win its second Stanley Cup during Mantha's tenure, in which he starred with two goals in the best-of-three Stanley Cup Final series against the heavily favored Bruins, which had the best winning percentage in NHL history during the regular season. In this season, Mantha had career highs in goals, assists and points, finishing second among league defencemen to King Clancy of the Senators in goals, and third behind Clancy and Bruin Eddie Shore in points.

The first season-ending All-Star Team was named in 1930–31, and Mantha was named Second Team All-Star on defence for both that year and the next, for his prowess as a defensive defenceman. Goaltender George Hainsworth would take over as team captain for Mantha in 1933, a post Mantha would regain the following season.

Following an incident in the 1934 season where Mantha successfully substituted for the suspended Newsy Lalonde as coach for the Habs in two matches—and beginning to fade as a player, no longer being a starter by the 1934 playoffs—he was named the full-time player-coach for the 1935–36 NHL season. After a dismal season, with Montreal missing the playoffs for the first time in a decade and finishing in last place, the Canadiens fired him as a coach, and then released him as a player before the start of the 1937 season.

In a game against the New York Rangers on January 28, 1937, Boston superstar Eddie Shore sustained a back injury that proved to be season ending. In consequence, the Bruins signed Mantha as a replacement. It took some time for him to get into game shape, and ultimately he played only four games for Boston. Spurred on by cracking a bone in his elbow, Mantha admitted he could no longer play at a competitive level, and retired.

== Retirement ==
After retirement as a player, Mantha worked as a linesman and referee for both the American Hockey League and the NHL. However, he found the continual travel required of an on-ice official grueling, and transitioned to coaching for Montreal-area junior league teams. He coached the Montreal Concordias, Laval Nationales (1943–1945), Verdun Maple Leafs (1945–1947), St. Jerome Eagles (1947–1948, 1951–1952), and Verdun Lasalle (1950–1951) before leaving organized hockey for good. During this time, Mantha was instrumental in steering future Hall of Famer Bernie Geoffrion to the Concordias, which at the time were under the control of the Canadiens, after seeing the then-14 year old Geoffrion score five goals in a match.

Mantha was inducted into the Hockey Hall of Fame in 1960, and died in Montreal in August 1974.

The Georges and Sylvio Mantha Arenas are part of the Complexe Récréatif Gadbois in Montreal and named for him and his brother Georges Mantha.

== Career statistics ==
			Regular season					Playoffs
Season	Team	League	GP	G	A	Pts	PIM	GP	G	A	Pts	PIM
1922–23	Montreal Nationale	MCBHL	9	4	0	4	—	—	—	—	—	—
1923–24	Montreal Canadiens	NHL	24	1	3	4	11	2	0	0	0	0
1923–24	Montreal Canadiens	St-Cup	—	—	—	—	—	4	0	0	0	0
1924–25	Montreal Canadiens	NHL	30	2	3	5	18	2	0	1	1	0
1924–25	Montreal Canadiens	St-Cup	—	—	—	—	—	4	0	0	0	2
1925–26	Montreal Canadiens	NHL	34	2	1	3	66	—	—	—	—	—
1926–27	Montreal Canadiens	NHL	43	10	5	15	77	4	1	0	1	0
1927–28	Montreal Canadiens	NHL	43	4	11	15	61	2	0	0	0	6
1928–29	Montreal Canadiens	NHL	44	9	4	13	56	3	0	0	0	0
1929–30	Montreal Canadiens	NHL	44	13	11	24	108	6	2	1	3	18
1930–31	Montreal Canadiens	NHL	44	4	7	11	75	10	2	1	3	26
1931–32	Montreal Canadiens	NHL	47	5	5	10	62	4	0	1	1	8
1932–33	Montreal Canadiens	NHL	48	4	7	11	50	2	0	1	1	2
1933–34	Montreal Canadiens	NHL	48	4	6	10	24	2	0	0	0	2
1934–35	Montreal Canadiens	NHL	47	3	11	14	36	2	0	0	0	2
1935–36	Montreal Canadiens	NHL	42	2	4	6	25	—	—	—	—	—
1936–37	Boston Bruins	NHL	4	0	0	0	2	—	—	—	—	—
NHL totals			542	63	78	141	671	39	5	5	10	64
St-Cup totals			—	—	—	—	—	8	0	0	0	2

== NHL coaching record ==
Team	Year	Regular season						Post season
Team	Year	G	W	L	T	Pts	Division rank	Result
Montreal Canadiens	1935–36	48	11	26	11	33	4th in Canadian	Missed playoffs

== See also ==
- List of members of the Hockey Hall of Fame

Preceded by Newsy Lalonde	Head coach of the Montreal Canadiens; 1935–36	Succeeded by Cecil Hart
Preceded by Billy Coutu	Montreal Canadiens captain 1926–32	Succeeded by George Hainsworth
Preceded by George Hainsworth	Montreal Canadiens captain 1933–36	Succeeded by Albert Babe Siebert
