= George Hainsworth =

Canadian ice hockey player (1893–1950)

- Hockey Hall of Fame, 1961
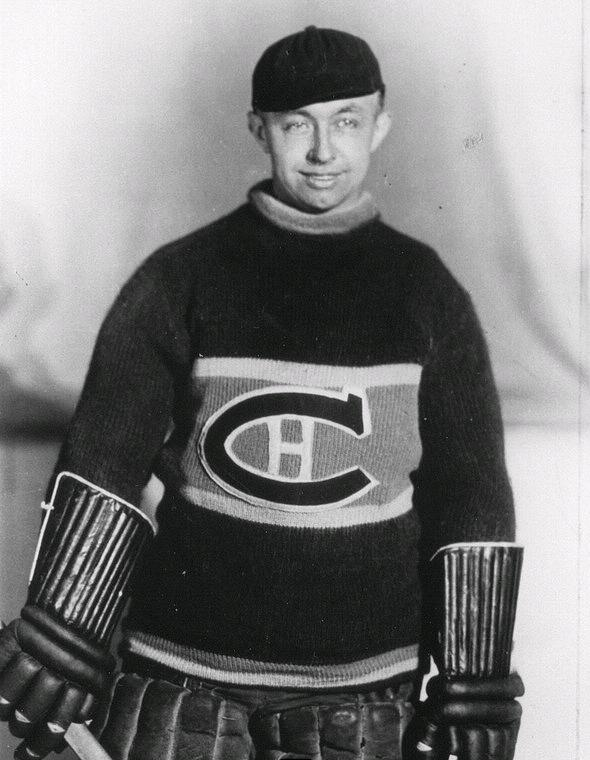
- Born: June 26, 1893 Toronto, Ontario, Canada
- Died: October 9, 1950 (aged 57) Gravenhurst, Ontario, Canada
- Height: 5 ft 6 in (168 cm)
- Weight: 150 lb (68 kg; 10 st 10 lb)
- Position: Goaltender
- Caught: Left
- Played for: Montreal Canadiens; Toronto Maple Leafs; Saskatoon Sheiks
- Playing career: 1926–1937

George Henry Hainsworth (June 26, 1893 – October 9, 1950) was a Canadian professional ice hockey goaltender who played for the Montreal Canadiens and Toronto Maple Leafs in the National Hockey League, and the Saskatoon Crescents in the Western Canada Hockey League. He was inducted into the Hockey Hall of Fame.

== Personal ==
Hainsworth was born in the Kew Beach area of Toronto on June 26, 1893. His parents, John Hainsworth and Mary James, were both from England. Hainsworth's family moved to Berlin, Ontario, where his father was a water commissioner for many years. Previously, his father had worked as a plumber in Toronto. He also owned a plumbing retail business, Hainsworth Plumbing, in Berlin.

After his playing days were over, Hainsworth returned to Berlin (now named Kitchener) with his wife Alma and son Bill. Bill played goaltender, like his father, and played in the Ontario Hockey Association (OHA) as a junior and later as a senior player but never a professional.

== Playing career ==
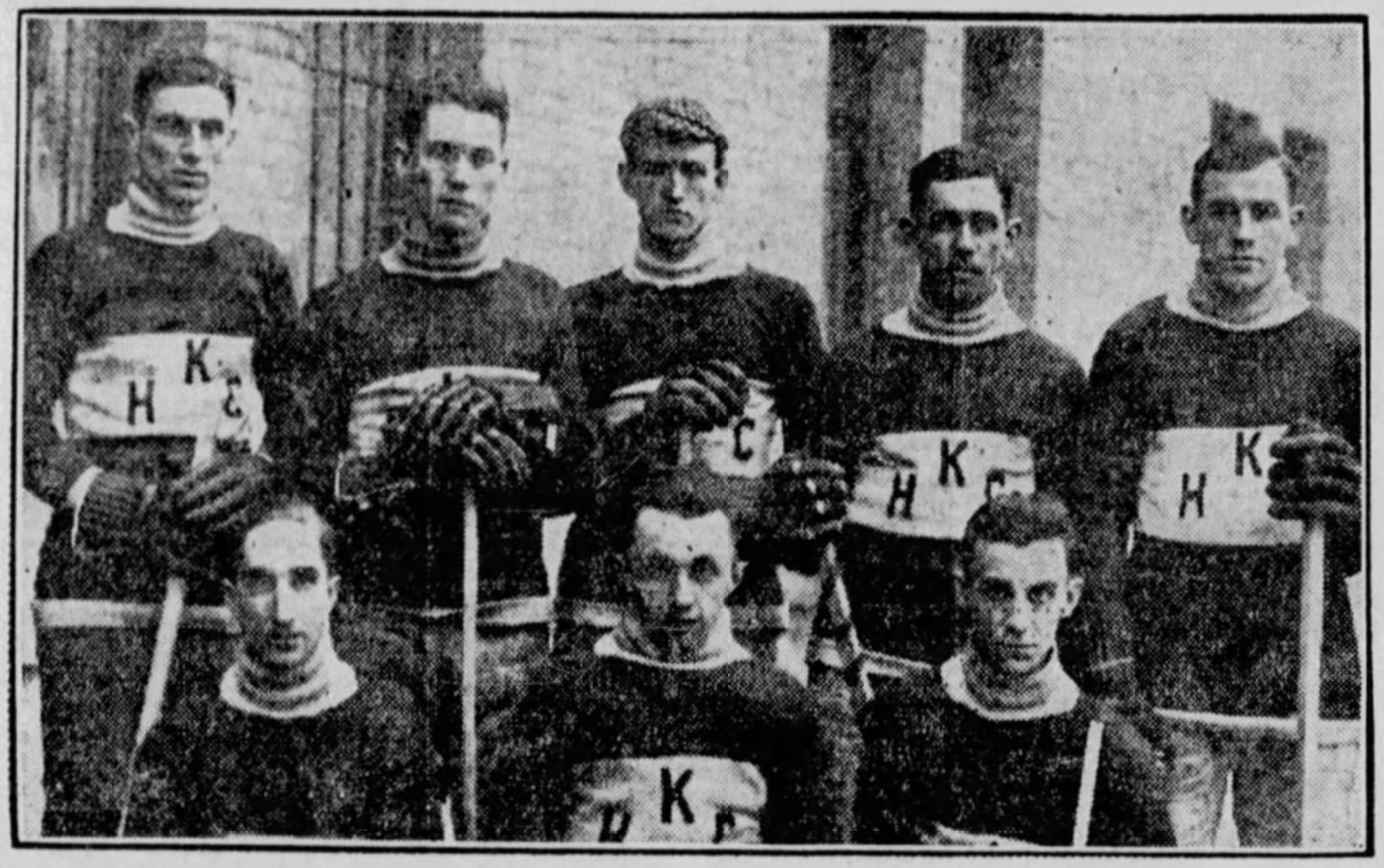
Kitchener Greenshirts in 1917–18, Hainsworth in the middle of the front row.

Hainsworth played junior hockey for the Berlin Union Jacks then moved up to senior hockey with the Berlin City Seniors and the Kitchener Greenshirts. Hainsworth won the Allan Cup, as senior amateur champions of Canada, with the Kitchener Greenshirts in 1918. One of the games he played for Kitchener against the Toronto Argonaut Rowing Club in the 1923 OHA playoffs was the first game that Foster Hewitt broadcast. By the end of the 1922–23 season, Hainsworth had played five seasons for the Greenshirts. At that time, Newsy Lalonde, manager of the Western Canada Hockey League (WCHL) Saskatoon Crescents, needed a goalie. On the recommendation of Montreal Canadiens' part-owner Leo Dandurand, Lalonde signed Hainsworth to a pro contract of $2,500 per season with Saskatoon. Hainsworth played three seasons with Saskatoon before he was signed by Dandurand to play goal for Montreal in 1926. The Western league was in the process of folding, and Dandurand signed Hainsworth to a $6,500 per year contract before Toronto claimed him from the Western league players who were en masse moving to the National Hockey League (NHL). Dandurand had to pay $5,000 to Saskatoon for the rights to Hainsworth.

There was a need for a top goaltender in Montreal. Georges Vezina, the Canadiens goaltender, had recently died of tuberculosis. Vezina had played every game in team history from the 1910–11 NHA season until the opening game of the 1925–26 NHL season, when the illness proved too much for him. In his memory, the team decided to create the Vezina Trophy for the team goaltender(s) who allowed the least goals in the NHL.

Hainsworth proved up to the challenge by winning the Vezina Trophy for the 1926–27, 1927–28 and 1928–29 NHL seasons. In 1928–29, he set an all-time record with 22 shutouts and a 0.92 goals against average while playing all 44 games. In 1930 he set an NHL record that still stands, going 270 minutes and 8 seconds without allowing a goal during the playoffs for the Canadiens. He backstopped the Canadiens to back to back Stanley Cups in 1930 and 1931. Hainsworth served as the Canadiens' captain during 1932–33, becoming the second of only eight goalies to serve as an NHL team's captain.

Hainsworth was traded to the Toronto Maple Leafs in 1933 for Lorne Chabot on October 1, 1933, in a move by Dandurand to land another French-Canadian on his roster and boost attendance. He helped the Maple Leafs reach the 1935 Stanley Cup Final. In 1936, Turk Broda won the goaltender job for Toronto, and Leaf manager Conn Smythe gave Hainsworth his outright release on November 25, 1936. Hainsworth retired, but was persuaded to join the Canadiens again after goaltender Wilf Cude was injured. He played four more games for the Montreal Canadiens, from December 12 to 20, 1936, before retiring for good. His 246 victories as a goaltender were the most in NHL history when he retired.

== Post career ==
In 1936, Hainsworth became a radio inspector with Dominion Electrohome Ltd. During World War II, he was a member of Kitchener's civil defence guard. In 1949, he was elected to Kitchener's city council.

Hainsworth died in a head-on collision between his car and a light panel truck near Gravenhurst, Ontario, on October 9, 1950. Hainsworth was pronounced dead at the scene from several broken ribs which punctured his heart. Hainsworth was returning home from Val D'Or, Quebec, where he and his wife had visited their son Bill. He was 57. His funeral was held October 13 at St. Mark's Lutheran Church in Kitchener and the burial was at Woodland Cemetery.

== Awards and achievements ==
- Vezina Trophy (1927, 1928, 1929)
- Stanley Cup Championship (1930, 1931)
- The Captains Cup (1933)
- Played in the 1934 NHL All-Star Game
- In 1998, he was ranked number 46 on The Hockey News' list of the 100 greatest hockey players.
- Inducted into the Hockey Hall of Fame in 1961.
- Inducted into the Ontario Sports Hall of Fame in 2004.

== Records ==
- He is third all-time in professional (including both NHL and WCHL/WHL) shutouts with 104.
- His 94 career NHL shutouts are third on the NHL's all-time list behind Martin Brodeur's 125 and Terry Sawchuk's 103.
- Has the second lowest career goals against average in the NHL with 1.93, behind Alex Connell's 1.91.
- Holds the NHL single-season shutout record with 22 shutouts in 1928–29.
- Holds the NHL single-season goals against average record with 0.92 in 1928–29.
- Holds the NHL single-playoffs record of time in net without allowing a goal, at 270 minutes and 8 seconds, in 1929-30.

== Career statistics ==
=== Regular season and playoffs ===
| | | | Regular season | | | | | | | | Playoffs |
| Season | Team | League | GP | W | L | T | Min | GA | SO | GAA | GP | W | L | T | Min | GA | SO | GAA |
|---|---|---|---|---|---|---|---|---|---|---|---|---|---|---|---|---|---|---|
| 1910–11 | Berlin Mavericks | Minor-ON | — | — | — | — | — | — | — | — | — | — | — | — | — | — | — | — |
| 1911–12 | Berlin Union Jacks | OHA Jr | 4 | 3 | 1 | 0 | 240 | 13 | 0 | 3.25 | 6 | 2 | 3 | 1 | 360 | 30 | 0 | 5.00 |
| 1912–13 | Berlin City Seniors | OHA Sr | 4 | 3 | 1 | 0 | 240 | 12 | 1 | 3.00 | 8 | 4 | 3 | 1 | 480 | 35 | 1 | 4.38 |
| 1913–14 | Berlin City Seniors | OHA Sr | 7 | 7 | 0 | 0 | 420 | 11 | 0 | 1.57 | 9 | 7 | 1 | 1 | 590 | 31 | 1 | 3.15 |
| 1914–15 | Berlin City Seniors | OHA Sr | 5 | 5 | 0 | 0 | 300 | 9 | 1 | 1.80 | 4 | 2 | 1 | 1 | 240 | 19 | 1 | 4.75 |
| 1915–16 | Berlin City Seniors | OHA Sr | 8 | 8 | 0 | 0 | 480 | 18 | 1 | 2.85 | 4 | 2 | 2 | 0 | 280 | 18 | 0 | 3.86 |
| 1916–17 | Kitchener Kew Beach | TIHL | — | — | — | — | — | — | — | — | — | — | — | — | — | — | — | — |
| 1917–18 | Kitchener Greenshirts | OHA Sr | 9 | 9 | 0 | 0 | 540 | 31 | 0 | 3.44 | 5 | 3 | 1 | 1 | 298 | 10 | 1 | 2.01 |
| 1918–19 | Kitchener Greenshirts | OHA Sr | 9 | 5 | 3 | 1 | 570 | 28 | 0 | 2.95 | — | — | — | — | — | — | — | — |
| 1919–20 | Kitchener Greenshirts | OHA Sr | 8 | 6 | 2 | 0 | 480 | 16 | 1 | 2.00 | 2 | 0 | 1 | 1 | 150 | 6 | 0 | 2.40 |
| 1920–21 | Kitchener Greenshirts | OHA Sr | 10 | 7 | 3 | 0 | 600 | 22 | 3 | 2.20 | 1 | 0 | 1 | 0 | 60 | 6 | 0 | 6.00 |
| 1921–22 | Kitchener Greenshirts | OHA Sr | 10 | 3 | 7 | 0 | 600 | 38 | 1 | 3.80 | — | — | — | — | — | — | — | — |
| 1922–23 | Kitchener Greenshirts | OHA Sr | 12 | 8 | 4 | 0 | 720 | 32 | 1 | 2.67 | — | — | — | — | — | — | — | — |
| 1923–24 | Saskatoon Crescents | WCHL | 30 | 15 | 12 | 3 | 1849 | 73 | 4 | 2.37 | — | — | — | — | — | — | — | — |
| 1924–25 | Saskatoon Crescents | WCHL | 28 | 16 | 11 | 1 | 1700 | 75 | 2 | 2.65 | 2 | 0 | 1 | 1 | 120 | 6 | 0 | 3.00 |
| 1925–26 | Saskatoon Sheiks | WHL | 30 | 18 | 11 | 1 | 1812 | 64 | 4 | 2.12 | 2 | 0 | 1 | 1 | 129 | 4 | 0 | 1.86 |
| 1926–27 | Montreal Canadiens | NHL | 44 | 28 | 14 | 2 | 2739 | 67 | 14 | 1.47 | 4 | 1 | 1 | 2 | 252 | 6 | 1 | 1.43 |
| 1927–28 | Montreal Canadiens | NHL | 44 | 26 | 11 | 7 | 2730 | 48 | 13 | 1.05 | 2 | 0 | 1 | 1 | 128 | 3 | 0 | 1.41 |
| 1928–29 | Montreal Canadiens | NHL | 44 | 22 | 7 | 15 | 2800 | 43 | 22 | 0.92 | 3 | 0 | 3 | 0 | 180 | 5 | 0 | 1.67 |
| 1929–30 | Montreal Canadiens | NHL | 42 | 20 | 13 | 9 | 2680 | 108 | 4 | 2.42 | 6 | 5 | 0 | 1 | 480 | 6 | 3 | 0.75 |
| 1930–31 | Montreal Canadiens | NHL | 44 | 26 | 10 | 8 | 2740 | 89 | 8 | 1.95 | 10 | 6 | 4 | 0 | 722 | 21 | 2 | 1.75 |
| 1931–32 | Montreal Canadiens | NHL | 48 | 25 | 16 | 7 | 3008 | 110 | 6 | 2.20 | 4 | 1 | 3 | 0 | 300 | 13 | 0 | 2.60 |
| 1932–33 | Montreal Canadiens | NHL | 48 | 18 | 25 | 5 | 2980 | 115 | 8 | 2.32 | 2 | 0 | 1 | 1 | 120 | 8 | 0 | 4.00 |
| 1933–34 | Toronto Maple Leafs | NHL | 48 | 26 | 13 | 9 | 3010 | 119 | 3 | 2.37 | 5 | 2 | 3 | 0 | 302 | 11 | 0 | 2.19 |
| 1934–35 | Toronto Maple Leafs | NHL | 48 | 30 | 14 | 4 | 2957 | 111 | 8 | 2.25 | 7 | 3 | 4 | 0 | 461 | 12 | 2 | 1.57 |
| 1935–36 | Toronto Maple Leafs | NHL | 48 | 23 | 19 | 6 | 3000 | 106 | 8 | 2.12 | 9 | 4 | 5 | 0 | 541 | 27 | 0 | 2.99 |
| 1936–37 | Toronto Maple Leafs | NHL | 3 | 0 | 2 | 1 | 190 | 9 | 0 | 2.84 | — | — | — | — | — | — | — | — |
| 1936–37 | Montreal Canadiens | NHL | 4 | 2 | 1 | 1 | 270 | 12 | 0 | 2.67 | — | — | — | — | — | — | — | — |
| WCHL totals | | | 88 | 49 | 34 | 5 | 5361 | 212 | 10 | 2.37 | — | — | — | — | — | — | — | — |
| NHL totals | | | 465 | 246 | 144 | 74 | 29,104 | 937 | 94 | 1.93 | 52 | 22 | 25 | 5 | 3484 | 112 | 8 | 1.93 |

== Bibliography ==
- Podnieks, Andrew (2003). Honoured Members: Hockey Hall of Fame. Bolton, Ontario: Fenn Publishing. ISBN 1-55168-239-7.

| Preceded by Sylvio Mantha | Montreal Canadiens captain 1932–33 | Succeeded by Sylvio Mantha |
| Preceded by New Award | Winner of the Vezina Trophy; 1927, 1928, 1929 | Succeeded by Cecil Thompson |
