= 1931–32 NHL season =

Professional ice hockey league season

- League: National Hockey League
- Sport: Ice hockey
- Duration: November 12, 1931 – April 9, 1932
- Games: 48
- Teams: 8

Regular season
- Season champions: Montreal Canadiens
- Season MVP: Howie Morenz (Canadiens)
- Top scorer: Busher Jackson (Maple Leafs)
- Canadian Division champions: Montreal Canadiens
- American Division champions: New York Rangers

Stanley Cup
- Champions: Toronto Maple Leafs
- Runners-up: New York Rangers

NHL seasons
- ← 1930–31 1932–33 →

The 1931–32 NHL season was the 15th season of the National Hockey League (NHL). The Ottawa Senators and Philadelphia Quakers suspended operations, leaving eight teams to play 48 games each. In the Stanley Cup Finals, the Toronto Maple Leafs swept the New York Rangers in three games to win the franchise's third Stanley Cup championship.

== League business ==
At the September 26, 1931, NHL meeting, the requests of the Philadelphia Quakers and the Ottawa Senators to suspend their franchises for the season were granted. The eight remaining teams divided up the Ottawa and Philadelphia players, whose contracts were leased from Ottawa and Philadelphia. (The Quakers would not return) The players went to other teams, but their contracts were intended to revert to the original clubs. Ottawa received an offer of $300,000 for the team, on the condition that it could move to Chicago and play in the new Chicago Stadium but the owners of the Chicago Black Hawks refused to allow the new team within their territory. The Detroit Falcons were bankrupt and went into receivership.

Meanwhile, the American Hockey Association, which had become the American Hockey League (AHL) in 1930–31, had declared itself a major league. NHL president Frank Calder condemned the AHL as an outlaw league, citing the team putting a franchise in Chicago, which had an NHL franchise, and a franchise in Buffalo where the NHL had a minor league affiliate. The AHL proposed a Stanley Cup challenge, and the Stanley Cup trustees ordered the NHL to play off. However, the Buffalo team collapsed and Calder entered into negotiations to merge the Chicago Shamrocks, owned by James Norris, with the bankrupt Detroit Falcons. The AHL signed an agreement with the NHL to become its minor league affiliate.

== Arena changes ==
The Toronto Maple Leafs moved from Arena Gardens to the new Maple Leaf Gardens. At one point, the whole project was near collapse, but when Conn Smythe and Frank Selke convinced the unions to accept stock in the Gardens as partial payment of wages, Maple Leaf Gardens was built.

== Regular season ==
Howie Morenz was as effective as ever for the Montreal Canadiens and won the Hart Trophy again, as the Habs once again finished first. The Rangers finished first in the American Division. But it was to be the year of Toronto, with the NHL's leading scorer Harvey "Busher" Jackson leading the way. Chicago spoiled Toronto's home opener at the new Maple Leafs Gardens with a 2–1 win, with the Black Hawks Mush March scoring the Gardens' first goal.

The Montreal Maroons were very interested in obtaining Eddie Shore from Boston. James Strachan, president of the Maroons, said he was willing to pay up to $40,000 for his contract. However, there was no deal. As Boston had fallen to the bottom of the league, it was doubtful that the Bruins would part with their ace defenceman.

=== Final standings ===
American Division
	GP	W	L	T	GF	GA	PTS
New York Rangers	48	23	17	8	134	112	54
Chicago Black Hawks	48	18	19	11	86	101	47
Detroit Falcons	48	18	20	10	95	108	46
Boston Bruins	48	15	21	12	122	117	42

Canadian Division
	GP	W	L	T	GF	GA	PTS
Montreal Canadiens	48	25	16	7	128	111	57
Toronto Maple Leafs	48	23	18	7	155	127	53
Montreal Maroons	48	19	22	7	142	139	45
New York Americans	48	16	24	8	95	142	40

== Playoffs ==
This was the only time since 1926–27 that three of the final four teams remaining in the playoffs were based in Canada.

=== Playoff bracket ===
The top three teams in each division qualified for the playoffs. The two division winners met in a best-of-five Stanley Cup semifinal series. The divisional second-place teams and third-place teams played off in a two-game total-goals series to determine the participants for the other two-game total-goals semifinal series. The semifinal winners then played in a best-of-five Stanley Cup Finals.

First round
C2	Toronto	6G
A2	Chicago	2G
C3	Mtl Maroons	3G
A3	Detroit	1G

Semifinals
C1	Mtl Canadiens	1
A1	NY Rangers	3
C2	Toronto	4G
C3	Mtl Maroons	3G

Final
A1	NY Rangers	0
C2	Toronto	3

=== Quarterfinals ===
==== (C2) Toronto Maple Leafs vs. (A2) Chicago Black Hawks ====
March 27	Toronto Maple Leafs	0–1	Chicago Black Hawks	Chicago Stadium	Recap
No scoring		First period	No scoring
No scoring		Second period	No scoring
No scoring		Third period	07:12 – Gerry Lowrey (1)
Charlie Gardiner		Goalie stats	Lorne Chabot

March 29	Chicago Black Hawks	1–6	Toronto Maple Leafs	Maple Leaf Gardens	Recap
No scoring		First period	08:32 – Hap Day (1); 09:55 – Charlie Conacher (1)
No scoring		Second period	06:07 – Bob Gracie (1); 12:47 – Charlie Conacher (2); 16:06 – Frank Finnigan (1)
Art Coulter (1) – 09:50		Third period	19:35 – Baldy Cotton (1)
Lorne Chabot		Goalie stats	Charlie Gardiner

Toronto won series on total goals 6–2

==== (A3) Detroit Falcons vs. (C3) Montreal Maroons ====
March 27	Montreal Maroons	1–1	Detroit Falcons	Olympia Stadium	Recap
No scoring		First period	11:10 – John Sorrell (1)
Baldy Northcott (1) – 01:00		Second period	No scoring
No scoring		Third period	No scoring
Alex Connell		Goalie stats	Flat Walsh

March 29	Detroit Falcons	0–2	Montreal Maroons	Montreal Forum	Recap
No scoring		First period	No scoring
No scoring		Second period	18:00 – Jimmy Ward (1)
No scoring		Third period	19:29 – Hooley Smith (1)
Flat Walsh		Goalie stats	Alex Connell

Montreal won series on total goals 3–1

=== Semifinals ===
==== (C1) Montreal Canadiens vs. (A1) New York Rangers ====
March 24	New York Rangers	3–4	Montreal Canadiens	Montreal Forum	Recap
Bun Cook (1) – sh – 18:57		First period	15:55 – pp – Howie Morenz (1)
Bill Cook (1) – pp – 08:12		Second period	01:17 – Aurele Joliat (1)
Bill Cook (2) – 16:57		Third period	07:00 – Johnny Gagnon (1); 15:11 – Pit Lepine (1)
John Ross Roach		Goalie stats	George Hainsworth

March 26	New York Rangers	4–3	3OT	Montreal Canadiens	Montreal Forum	Recap
No scoring		First period		05:48 – Wildor Larochelle (1)
Earl Seibert (1) – 10:55		Second period		02:31 – sh – Aurele Joliat (2)
Butch Keeling (1) – pp – 04:24; Ching Johnson (1) – 08:40		Third period		03:33 – Armand Mondou (1)
Bun Cook (2) – 19:32		Third overtime period		No scoring
John Ross Roach		Goalie stats		George Hainsworth

March 27	Montreal Canadiens	0–1	New York Rangers	Madison Square Garden III	Recap
No scoring		First period	No scoring
No scoring		Second period	02:08 – Ott Heller (1)
No scoring		Third period	No scoring
George Hainsworth		Goalie stats	John Ross Roach

March 29	Montreal Canadiens	2–5	New York Rangers	Madison Square Garden III	Recap
No scoring		First period	No scoring
Wildor Larochelle (2) – 17:22; Albert Leduc (1) – 19:10		Second period	08:54 – Ott Heller (2); 12:01 – Ott Heller (3); 12:21 – Bill Cook (3)
No scoring		Third period	11:36 – Cecil Dillon (1); 19:14 – Butch Keeling (2)
George Hainsworth		Goalie stats	John Ross Roach

New York won series 3–1

==== (C2) Toronto Maple Leafs vs. (C3) Montreal Maroons ====
March 31	Toronto Maple Leafs	1–1	Montreal Maroons	Montreal Forum	Recap
Charlie Conacher (3) – 16:58		First period	No scoring
No scoring		Second period	No scoring
No scoring		Third period	06:00 – Dave Trottier (1)
Lorne Chabot		Goalie stats	Flat Walsh

April 2	Montreal Maroons	2–3	OT	Toronto Maple Leafs	Maple Leaf Gardens	Recap
No scoring		First period		03:21 – Red Horner (1)
Jimmy Ward (2) – 17:26		Second period		No scoring
Hooley Smith (2) – 01:06		Third period		09:02 – Hap Day (2)
No scoring		First overtime period		17:59 – Bob Gracie (2)
Flat Walsh		Goalie stats		Lorne Chabot

Toronto won series on total goals 4–3

=== Stanley Cup Finals ===
The Toronto Maple Leafs swept the best-of-five series against the New York Rangers three games to none. The first two games were to be played in New York City but because the circus was in town, the second game was played in Boston. The third and final game was played in Toronto. It was called the "Tennis Series", because the Leafs scored 6 goals in each game.

April 5	Toronto Maple Leafs	6–4	New York Rangers	Madison Square Garden III	Recap
Hap Day (3) – 04:25		First period	17:25 – Bun Cook (3)
Busher Jackson (1) – 03:35; Busher Jackson (2) – 10:20; Charlie Conacher (4) – 10:50; Busher Jackson (3) – 17:05		Second period	18:20 – Cecil Dillon (2)
Red Horner (2) – 18:32		Third period	02:35 – Ching Johnson (2); 06:30 – Bun Cook (4)
Lorne Chabot		Goalie stats	John Ross Roach

April 7	Toronto Maple Leafs	6–2	New York Rangers	Boston Garden	Recap
No scoring		First period	03:53 – Bun Cook (5)
Busher Jackson (4) – 02:06; Charlie Conacher (5) – 08:58		Second period	01:00 – Doug Brennan (1)
King Clancy (1) – 01:49; Charlie Conacher (6) – 09:56; King Clancy (2) – 10:51; Baldy Cotton (2) – 17:10		Third period	No scoring
Lorne Chabot		Goalie stats	John Ross Roach

April 9	New York Rangers	4–6	Toronto Maple Leafs	Maple Leaf Gardens	Recap
No scoring		First period	05:39 – Andy Blair (1); 06:11 – Andy Blair (2)
Frank Boucher (1) – 15:24		Second period	10:57 – Busher Jackson (5)
Bun Cook (6) – 16:32; Frank Boucher (2) – 18:26; Frank Boucher (3) – 19:26		Third period	08:56 – Frank Finnigan; 15:07 – Ace Bailey (1); 17:36 – Bob Gracie (3)
John Ross Roach		Goalie stats	Lorne Chabot

Toronto won series 3–0

== Awards ==
Howie Morenz won the Hart Trophy for the second time in his career. Joe Primeau won the Lady Byng, the one time he would win the trophy in his career. Chuck Gardiner won the Vezina, the first of two times he would win the trophy.

1931–32 NHL awards
O'Brien Cup: (Canadian Division champion)	Montreal Canadiens
Prince of Wales Trophy: (American Division champion)	New York Rangers
Hart Trophy: (Most valuable player)	Howie Morenz, Montreal Canadiens
Lady Byng Trophy: (Excellence and sportsmanship)	Joe Primeau, Toronto Maple Leafs
Vezina Trophy: (Fewest goals allowed)	Chuck Gardiner, Chicago Black Hawks

=== All-Star teams ===
First Team	Position	Second Team
Chuck Gardiner, Chicago Black Hawks	G	Roy Worters, New York Americans
Eddie Shore, Boston Bruins	D	Sylvio Mantha, Montreal Canadiens
Ching Johnson, New York Rangers	D	King Clancy, Toronto Maple Leafs
Howie Morenz, Montreal Canadiens	C	Hooley Smith, Montreal Maroons
Bill Cook, New York Rangers	RW	Charlie Conacher, Toronto Maple Leafs
Busher Jackson, Toronto Maple Leafs	LW	Aurel Joliat, Montreal Canadiens
Lester Patrick, New York Rangers	Coach	Dick Irvin, Toronto Maple Leafs

== Player statistics ==
=== Leading scorers ===
Note: GP = Games played, G = Goals, A = Assists, PTS = Points, PIM = Penalties in minutes

Player	Team	GP	G	A	Pts	PIM
Busher Jackson	Toronto Maple Leafs	48	28	25	53	63
Joe Primeau	Toronto Maple Leafs	46	13	37	50	25
Howie Morenz	Montreal Canadiens	48	24	25	49	46
Charlie Conacher	Toronto Maple Leafs	44	34	14	48	66
Bill Cook	New York Rangers	48	34	14	48	33
Dave Trottier	Montreal Maroons	48	26	18	44	94
Hooley Smith	Montreal Maroons	43	11	33	44	49
Babe Siebert	Montreal Maroons	48	21	18	39	64
Dit Clapper	Boston Bruins	48	17	22	39	21
Aurel Joliat	Montreal Canadiens	48	15	24	39	46

Source: NHL.

=== Leading goaltenders ===
Note: GP = Games played; Mins = Minutes played; GA = Goals against; SO = Shutouts; GAA = Goals against average

Player	Team	GP	W	L	T	Mins	GA	SO	GAA
Charlie Gardiner	Chicago Black Hawks	48	18	19	11	2989	92	4	1.85
Alec Connell	Detroit Falcons	48	18	20	10	3050	108	6	2.12
George Hainsworth	Montreal Canadiens	48	25	16	7	2998	110	6	2.20
John Ross Roach	New York Rangers	48	23	17	8	3020	112	9	2.23
Tiny Thompson	Boston Bruins	43	13	19	11	2698	103	9	2.29
Lorne Chabot	Toronto Maple Leafs	44	22	16	6	2698	106	4	2.36

Source: NHL.

== Coaches ==
=== American Division ===
- Boston Bruins: Art Ross
- Chicago Black Hawks: Emil Iverson and Godfrey Matheson
- Detroit Falcons: Jack Adams
- New York Rangers: Lester Patrick

=== Canadian Division ===
- Montreal Canadiens: Cecil Hart
- Montreal Maroons: Sprague Cleghorn
- New York Americans: Eddie Gerard
- Toronto Maple Leafs: Art Duncan and Dick Irvin

== Debuts ==
The following is a list of players of note who played their first NHL game in 1931–32 (listed with their first team, asterisk(*) marks debut in playoffs):

- Art Coulter, Chicago Black Hawks
- Earl Seibert, New York Rangers
- Ott Heller, New York Rangers

Another notable debut in 1931 was Canadian national radio coverage of Toronto Maple Leafs games on the Canadian National Railway radio network. The program, originally known as the General Motors Hockey Broadcast, evolved over time into the modern CBC TV broadcast of Hockey Night in Canada.

== Last games ==
The following is a list of players of note that played their last game in the NHL in 1931–32 (listed with their last team):

- Georges Boucher, Chicago Black Hawks
- Art Gagne, Detroit Falcons
- Carson Cooper, Detroit Falcons

== See also ==
- 1931–32 NHL transactions
- List of Stanley Cup champions
- Ice hockey at the 1932 Winter Olympics
- 1931 in sports
- 1932 in sports
