= Louis Letourneau =

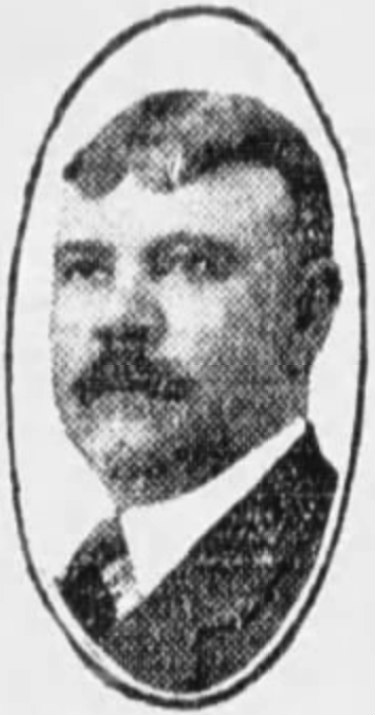
Louis Letourneau c. 1922

Hilarion Adolphe "Louis" Letourneau (1868 – April 29, 1952) was an ice hockey team owner of the Montreal Canadiens hockey team.

Following the death of George Kennedy, (Montreal Canadiens owner), in October 1921, Letourneau: Leo Dandurand and Joseph Cattarinich bought the team for $11,000. This trio was affectionately referred to as the "Three Musketeers" of hockey owners. Louis left the team after 1930 Stanley Cup win, and Letourneau retained his share of the ownership until he sold it in 1932. His name is on Stanley Cup with Montreal Canadiens in 1924 & 1930. He died on April 29, 1952, at the age of 84.
