= Babe Siebert =

Canadian ice hockey player (1904–1939)

- Hockey Hall of Fame, 1964
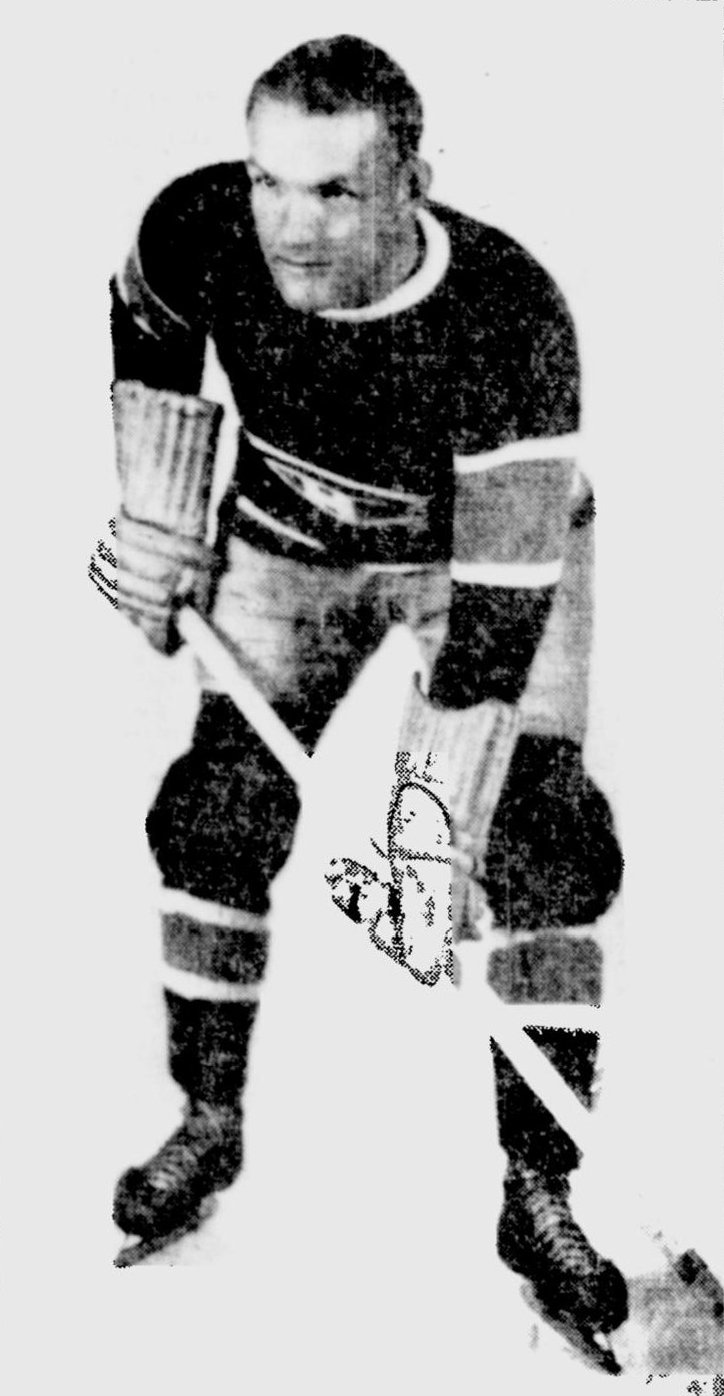
- Born: January 14, 1904 Plattsville, Ontario, Canada
- Died: August 25, 1939 (aged 35) Lake Huron, Ontario, Canada
- Height: 5 ft 10 in (178 cm)
- Weight: 182 lb (83 kg; 13 st 0 lb)
- Position: Left wing/Defence
- Shot: Left
- Played for: Montreal Maroons; New York Rangers; Boston Bruins; Montreal Canadiens
- Playing career: 1925–1939

Charles Albert "Babe" Siebert (January 14, 1904 – August 25, 1939) was a Canadian professional ice hockey player. A left winger and defenceman, he played 14 seasons in the National Hockey League (NHL) for the Montreal Maroons, New York Rangers, Boston Bruins and Montreal Canadiens. He won the 1926 Stanley Cup championship with the Maroons, and was a member of the famous "S Line", and another with the Rangers in 1933.

A physical forward known for his fighting ability while with the Maroons and Rangers, an apparent decline in his play was reversed when he switched to defence after he was traded to the Bruins. Siebert was named an all-star three times after the switch and won the Hart Trophy as the NHL's most valuable player in 1937 as a member of the Canadiens.

Siebert was named the head coach of the Canadiens upon his retirement as a player in 1939. He never coached a game as he drowned in Lake Huron prior to the 1939–40 NHL season. The league organized an all-star benefit game that raised $15,000 for Siebert's family. He was inducted into the Hockey Hall of Fame in 1964.

== Early life ==
Born in Plattsville, Ontario, Siebert grew up in the nearby community of Zurich, located on the eastern shores of Lake Huron. He became obsessed with hockey at an early age, playing the game nearly every day. He played intermediate hockey in Zurich and Exeter before moving to Kitchener to play junior hockey. Though his elder brothers mocked his simple playing style—he used his size and strength to push his way through opponents—Siebert was invited to join the Kitchener Greenshirts in 1922. He won the Ontario Hockey Association (OHA) and eastern Canadian junior championships with Kitchener in 1922–23, but lost the Memorial Cup final to the University of Manitoba. After a year of senior hockey in Kitchener, he moved on to the Niagara Falls Cataracts, winning the OHA senior championship in 1924–25.

== Professional career ==
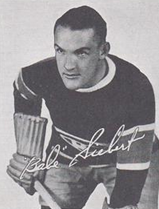
Babe Siebert in 1938–39 Quaker Oats card

Siebert was signed by the Montreal Maroons in 1925 and made his professional debut that same year. He finished second on the team with 16 goals as the Maroons finished second in the NHL standings. Montreal defeated the Pittsburgh Pirates and Ottawa Senators in the playoffs to win the NHL championship. Siebert scored three points in the 1926 Stanley Cup Final as the Maroons defeated the Western Hockey League champion Victoria Cougars to win the Stanley Cup.

When Hooley Smith arrived in Montreal in 1926–27, Siebert was paired with Smith and Nels Stewart. The trio were known as the "S Line" and emerged as one of the top scoring lines in the NHL. Stewart was the goal scorer on the line while Smith set him up with his passing game, but it was Siebert who used his strength and speed to move the puck out of their defensive zone and to create space for his line mates. His physical style of play occasionally resulted in Siebert being brought in front of league president Frank Calder for supplementary discipline, as in December 1927 when he was suspended for a time following a violent melee with Billy Boucher of the New York Americans. When Boucher responded to an elbow by slashing Siebert over the head, the latter player responded with repeated wild swings of his own stick at Boucher, injuring him.

Siebert's best offensive season came in 1931–32 when he finished eighth in league scoring with 39 points. It proved to be his last season with the Maroons, as the team was struggling financially and chose to sell him to the New York Rangers for cash. He went on to win his second Stanley Cup that year. He struggled offensively for much of the season, however, and it was rumoured he would be traded. The trade finally happened early in the 1933–34 season as he was sent to the Boston Bruins in exchange for Vic Ripley and Roy Burmeister. The deal reunited Siebert with former S Line member Nels Stewart.

After Eddie Shore was suspended for his assault on Ace Bailey, Bruins coach Art Ross shifted Siebert from left wing to defence. The switch rejuvenated his career; he enjoyed a comeback season in 1934–35. Frequently remaining on the ice for entire games as one of Boston's key players, Siebert earned five votes in a 1935 Associated Press poll naming the top comeback player in sport for that year. He later scoffed at the legend of his comeback in Boston, stating that he never lost his ability to play at the same level he did with the Maroons, instead blaming Lester Patrick for improperly utilizing him in New York.

While Shore and Siebert were an effective pairing on defence, tensions between the two were evident. They shared a violent feud when they were opponents, and never spoke a word to the other as teammates. Though he was named a first team all-star in 1935–36, the Bruins decided Siebert's career was in decline and chose to trade him to the Montreal Canadiens along with Roger Jenkins in exchange for Leroy Goldsworthy, Sammy McManus and cash following the season. He was immediately named the team's captain, a position he retained until his retirement. In his first season with the Canadiens, Siebert earned his second all-star selection and won the Hart Trophy as the most valuable player in the NHL. He earned his third consecutive all-star selection in 1937–38. Plagued by injuries in his final season, Siebert announced his retirement in 1939 to become the head coach of the Canadiens.

== Death and family ==
Siebert never had the opportunity to take up his new post. On August 25, 1939, while vacationing with his family and swimming with his daughters at Lake Huron, he drowned attempting to retrieve an inflatable tire they were playing with. Shocked by the news, Siebert's peers lauded his character and play, indicating that his death was a considerable loss to the game of hockey. Among them, his former manager with the Maroons, Tommy Gorman, remarked that Siebert was popular with his fellow players and was a great defenceman who "lost fairly and won modestly".

At the time of his death, Siebert was visiting his cottage to celebrate the 80th birthday of his father, William. He cherished the time he had with his two daughters Judy and Joan, who were 11 and 10 years old respectively, when they witnessed his drowning. His loss represented a significant financial burden for his family as he spent nearly all of his income paying for his paraplegic wife's medical costs.

The league organized an all-star benefit game to aid Siebert's widow with the goal of raising $15,000. It was the third such benefit game in NHL history. The Montreal Canadiens faced an all-star team composed of the best players from the remaining teams. The all-stars defeated the Canadiens 5–2 in the game held on October 29, 1939. Though organizers were disappointed with the attendance of just 6,000 fans, they met their $15,000 target.

A physical player and fighter on the ice, Siebert was a soft-spoken family man off it. He was especially faithful to his wife, Bernice, who was left a paraplegic following complications during the birth of their second child. Fans at the Montreal Forum routinely saw him carry his wife to her seat before every home game, and then carry her out after. At home, he did the housework that his wife was unable to do. As a result, he was immensely popular with his peers and fans.

Siebert was inducted into the Hockey Hall of Fame in 1964, and is an honoured member of the Waterloo Region Hall of Fame.

== Career statistics ==
			Regular season					Playoffs
Season	Team	League	GP	G	A	Pts	PIM	GP	G	A	Pts	PIM
1923–24	Kitchener Twin City	OHA-Sr	10	9	4	13	—	—	—	—	—	—
1924–25	Niagara Falls Cataracts	OHA-Sr	20	9	2	11	26	10	7	0	7	—
1925–26	Montreal Maroons	NHL	35	16	8	24	108	8	2	2	4	6
1926–27	Montreal Maroons	NHL	42	5	3	8	116	2	1	0	1	2
1927–28	Montreal Maroons	NHL	41	8	9	17	109	9	2	0	2	26
1928–29	Montreal Maroons	NHL	40	3	5	8	52	—	—	—	—	—
1929–30	Montreal Maroons	NHL	39	14	19	33	94	3	0	0	0	0
1930–31	Montreal Maroons	NHL	43	16	12	28	76	2	0	0	0	6
1931–32	Montreal Maroons	NHL	48	21	18	39	64	4	0	1	1	4
1932–33	New York Rangers	NHL	43	9	10	19	38	8	1	0	1	12
1933–34	New York Rangers	NHL	13	0	1	1	5	—	—	—	—	—
1933–34	Boston Bruins	NHL	32	5	6	11	31	—	—	—	—	—
1934–35	Boston Bruins	NHL	48	6	18	24	80	4	0	0	0	0
1935–36	Boston Bruins	NHL	45	12	9	21	66	2	0	1	1	0
1936–37	Montreal Canadiens	NHL	44	8	20	28	38	5	1	2	3	2
1937–38	Montreal Canadiens	NHL	37	8	11	19	56	3	1	1	2	0
1938–39	Montreal Canadiens	NHL	44	9	7	16	36	3	0	0	0	0
NHL totals			594	140	156	296	982	49	7	5	12	62

Statistics sourced from NHL.com.

== See also ==
- Captain (hockey)
- List of members of the Hockey Hall of Fame

Awards and achievements
Preceded by Eddie Shore	Winner of the Hart Trophy; 1937	Succeeded by Eddie Shore
Sporting positions
Preceded by Sylvio Mantha	Montreal Canadiens captain 1936–39	Succeeded by Walter Buswell
Preceded by Jules Dugal	Head coach of the Montreal Canadiens; 1939	Succeeded by Alfred "Pit" Lepine
