= Connaught Park Racetrack =

Defunct horse racing track

Coordinates: 45.400303°N 75.799012°W

Connaught Park Racetrack Hippodrome d'Aylmer
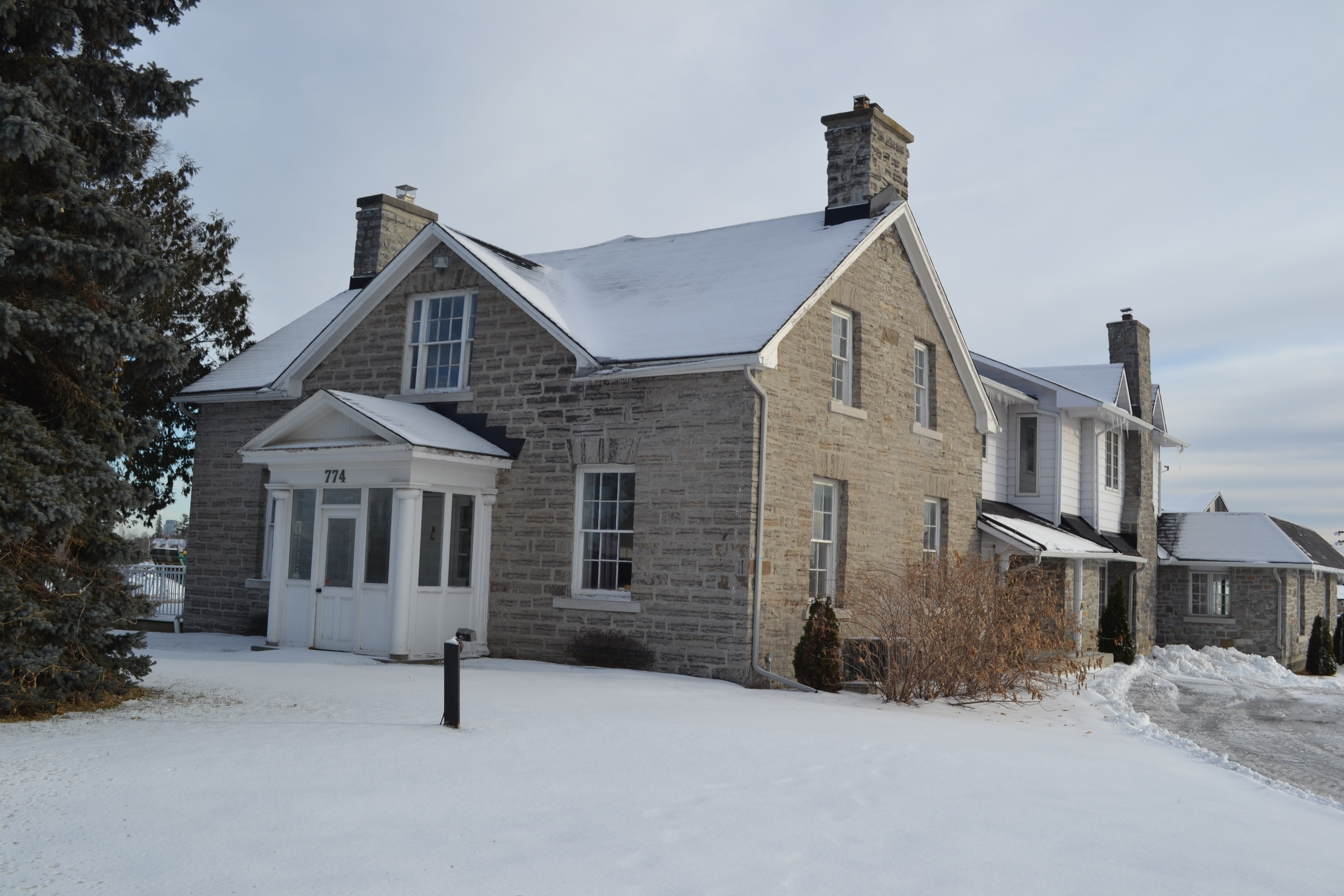
- Samuel-Stewart House, late jockey club on the racetrack site.
- Interactive map of Connaught Park Racetrack; Hippodrome d'Aylmer
- Location: 788 Aylmer Road, Gatineau, Quebec, Canada
- Owned by: Tommy Gorman
- Date opened: Thoroughbreds: June 14, 1913; Standardbreds: 1953
- Date closed: Thoroughbreds: July 5, 1954; Standardbreds: 2008
- Course type: Flat Thoroughbred (1 mile (1.6 km)); Harness (1/2 mi.); Infield: Steeplechase

Connaught Park, later known as Hippodrome d'Aylmer, was a thoroughbred, steeplechase and harness racing track, later having a casino and live betting parlor, that operated from 1913 until 2009. The track was located in the Aylmer, Quebec district of Gatineau, Quebec, Canada, near Ottawa, Ontario. It had two tracks: a one-mile dirt track used until 1954 for thoroughbred racing, and a half-mile dirt track, used for harness racing. Racing ended in 2008 after its owner declared bankruptcy. The site was sold in 2009 for a housing development.

Opening day advertisement for Connaught

== History ==
The track was founded in 1913, named after the governor-general of the time Prince Arthur, Duke of Connaught and Strathearn, who was also the club's first honorary president. The Connaught Park Jockey Club was founded by J. McEntee Bowman, a hotelier from New York city, Ed Skead and J. K. Paisley. The first president was Hal B. McGiverin. Directors included Thomas Ahearn, J. W. Woods, L. N. Bate, Redmond Quain, Stewart McClenahan, J. W. Carling, N. A. Belcourt, C. E. Fauqier and Clifford Sifton. The 90 acres (36 ha) site was selected from several sites in Aylmer and special soil was brought to the site and a one-mile track was laid out. At first, the race track held thoroughbred racing, but steeplechase races were also held, through the field at the track.

The first races were held on June 14, 1913, with Sir Wilfrid Laurier in attendance, part of a seven-day meeting. Music was provided by the band of the Duke of Cornwall's Own Rifles and the Hull City Band. The first race was for three-year-olds and was won by Lindesta ridden by jockey Eddie Ambrose. The top race of the day was the fourth race, at a mile and one-eighth for $1,500 and a silver plate. The race was won by a filly, Airey and was also ridden by Ambrose.

The track operated annually until 1917, under the Canadian Racing Association, when it was interrupted for war-time reasons. The track re-opened in 1920, under the presidency of Senator Belcourt and the secretary was Tommy Gorman. It continued under the CRA until 1934, when it joined the Province of Quebec Racing Association, whose president was Gorman. The club was reorganized in 1937 under the partnership of Gorman and the owners of the Montreal Canadiens, Leo Dandurand and Joe Cattarinich, and Gorman became the general manager.

In 1920, a famous scandal in horse racing occurred at Connaught. The horse Westy Hogan was disguised to look like the inferior horse Little Boy. The disguise went to the lengths of painting the horse, a scar was duplicated on his right front leg, a cut was made to the right front hoof, and two teeth were removed, all to resemble Little Boy. The horse was victorious and tens of thousands of dollars were paid out to bettors all around North America. The conspirators fled the scene immediately after the race, abandoning Westy Hogan in a stable. The fraud was not detected until after they had fled the scene. Westy Hogan, which had been stolen, was seized by Connaught, but returned to his Detroit owners for $60,000 after court action. Gorman later estimated the losses to North American bookmakers at $500,000.

In 1931, Connaught Park introduced the daily double format of betting on horses. The idea was credited to Leo Dandurand. The daily double allowed betters to make a higher-odds bet, picking the winners of two races at the track. It was introduced on June 3, 1931, for bettors to pick the winners of the third and fifth races.

By 1954, Connaught was one of the last tracks in Quebec holding races for thoroughbreds. The purses offered by Connaught and Blue Bonnets were not acceptable to the Horsemen's Benevolent and Protective Association (HBPA). Connaught raced one fourteen-day meeting in 1954 while negotiations were being held with the HBPA. On July 5, 1954, the final day of the meet, after negotiations had broken down and Connaught was to announce that a second fourteen-day meet was cancelled, the day's racing was cancelled after one race. Conditions of the one-mile track were considered unsafe by the jockeys and they refused to race again on the track. It was the last thoroughbred race held at Connaught. Connaught would only hold standardbred (harness) races.

Tommy Gorman died in 1961, after which his sons Joe and Frank operated the track, until Frank's death in 1984. Ownership was split between Tommy Gorman's children.

Competition for Connaught arrived in 1962 with the building of Rideau Carleton Raceway south of Ottawa. The two tracks were able to co-exist as race dates between the two tracks were staged to prevent overlap. Attendance at Connaught started to decline in the early 1980s, with a 27% decline in the years 1982 to 1985.

After Frank Gorman's death, a legal battle between Betty Hern, Joe Gorman and Frank Gorman's estate was waged over ownership of the track. Joe Gorman bought out his partners for an estimated $1 million in a sale that was closed in December 1986. Several shares of the track had been given by T. P. Gorman to hockey players and the shares were never found. The Clinton Park Driving Association and Rideau Carleton Raceway had each bid for the track.

Gorman invested in a new dining room at the track, but revenues continued to decline. In 1993, Joe Gorman retired after a stay in hospital, leaving his wife Pilar in charge. That same year, the Connaught Cup race, the track's premier event, was cancelled to save money. The Connaught Cup was brought back in May 1994.

Money problems led to the Quebec Racing Commission suspending Connaught's license in March 1995. The track was in debt to the horse owners in the amount of $317,000, which it could not pay. Management of Connaught attempted to restructure finances, while Connaught's race dates were moved to Rideau Carleton.

Bankruptcy came in September 1995. Before the bankruptcy, the track property had been put up for sale for $5 million. A proposal to sell off some land for a housing development was rejected by Aylmer Council. The track owed the $317,000 to horsemen, $400,000 in taxes, $100,000 to Quebec Hydro, and a $1.6 million mortgage to Toronto-Dominion Bank. Gorman was unable to stop the Bank petition into bankruptcy in court.

=== Hippodrome d'Aylmer ===
One plan to refloat the track with horsemen investing in the track failed. In May 1996, retired newspaper executive Michel St. Louis and 28 other investors purchased the track for $1.2 million and $500,000 in unpaid taxes. St. Louis, a horseman himself, and the investors pooled their RRSP savings to buy the track. The track reopened as Hippodrome d'Aylmer on September 29, 1996.

In 2002, the operation was taken over by the Government of Quebec, which had been subsidizing the harness racing industry in Quebec. The facilities were rebuilt with an expanded betting parlour and Loto-Quebec gambling machines and a reduced racing schedule. The ownership was merged with several other racetracks in Quebec and management was given to the SONACC (Societe nationale du cheval de course) Quebec government agency. The racetracks were sold in 2006 to Attractions Hippiques owned by Senator Paul Massicotte. Massicote planned to spend $2 million on improvements to the Aylmer track.

The 2008 meeting at Aylmer would be its last. In June 2008, Attractions Hippiques was placed under bankruptcy protection, citing debts of $73 million against $41 million in assets. Hippodrome d'Aylmer's betting parlour remained open until October 9, 2009, when Attractions Hippiques sold the site to a local developer.

== Housing development ==
The site, next door to the Rivermead Golf Course, was planned to become an 'urban village' type subdivision under the name of 'Village Urbain des Golfs'. Construction will proceed according to housing demand in Aylmer. Neighbourhood groups fought the proposal, with Gatineau's mayor proposing to freeze the land's current recreational zoning. A housing development known as "Quartier Connaught" has since been built on part of the lands. The racetrack grandstand remained standing for several years but has since been demolished.

== See also ==
- Hippodrome de Montreal
