= Cecil Hart =

Canadian ice hockey coach

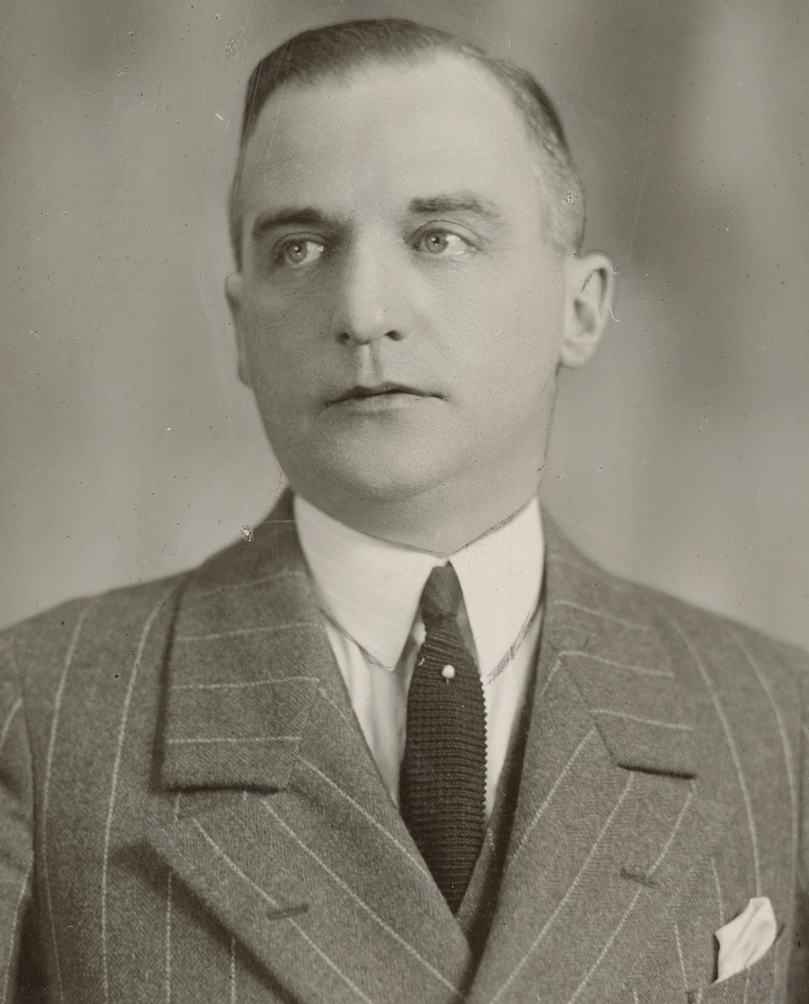
- Born: Cecil Mordecai Hart; November 28, 1883; Bedford, Quebec, Canada
- Died: July 16, 1940 (aged 56)
- Known for: Ice hockey manager and coach

Cecil Mordecai Hart (November 28, 1883 – July 16, 1940) was a head coach and general manager of the Montreal Canadiens in the National Hockey League. He is one of 20 head coaches to win the Stanley Cup twice.

== Biography ==
Cecil Hart was Jewish, a direct descendant of Aaron Hart who was Canada's first Jewish settler, and was born in Bedford, Quebec.

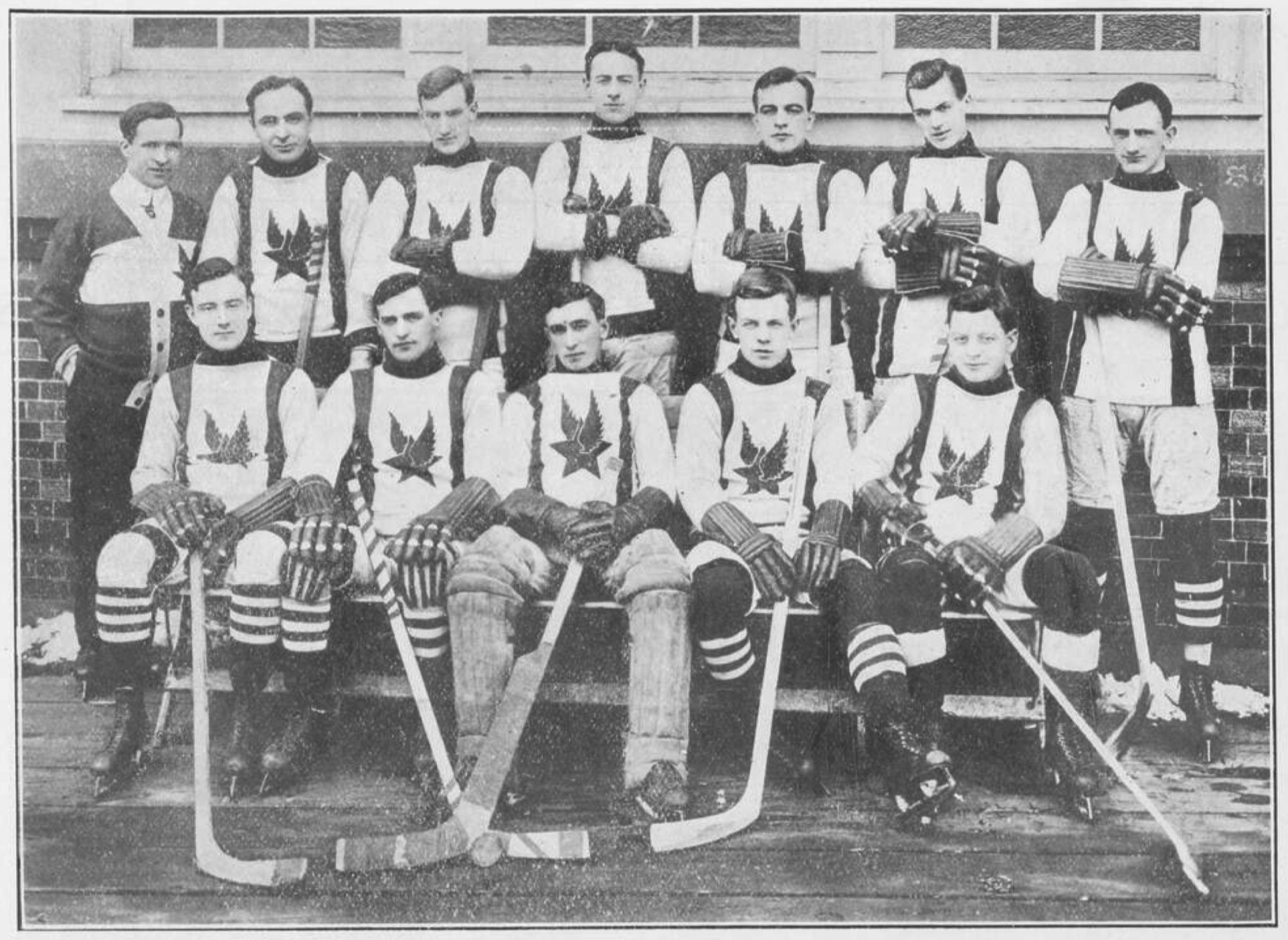
Montreal Stars in 1912, Hart seated second from the left

During the early 1910s Hart was a player and manager with the Montreal Stars of the Montreal City Hockey League, where he was a teammate of future NHL referee Cooper Smeaton.

Hart helped lead the Montreal Canadiens to two Stanley Cups, in 1930 and 1931. He was fired after a dispute with Canadiens' owner Léo Dandurand after leading the Canadiens to first place in the 1931–32 season, but after Dandurand and Joseph Cattarinich sold the Canadiens to Ernest Savard and Maurice Forget of the Canadian Arena Company, the Canadiens hit bottom in 1935–36.

To rebuild the team, they rehired Hart in 1936–37, but Hart would only come back if Howie Morenz did. A deal was arranged and with Morenz back, and despite the death of Morenz during the season, Hart managed to lead the Canadiens to first place. After that, the team eroded as age caught up with some key players. With the Canadiens near the bottom of the league standings in 1938–39, Cecil resigned as coach and manager. Only eighteen other people have won multiple Stanley Cups besides Hart as a head coach, although he is not currently inducted into the Hockey Hall of Fame despite being eligible.

Hart later became vice president and treasurer of the Quebec, Ontario and Vermont Baseball League before his untimely death. Hart died after a lengthy illness in July 1940. Hart was inducted into the International Jewish Sports Hall of Fame in 1992.

Hart's father, David Hart, donated a trophy to the NHL in 1923, to be awarded each season to the player most valuable to his team. The first trophy was first awarded at the conclusion of the 1923-24 season to Frank Nighbor of the Ottawa Senators. The NHL retired the original trophy in 1960 to the Hockey Hall of Fame, and began presenting the Hart Memorial Trophy in its place.

== NHL coaching record ==
Team	Year	Regular season						Post season				
Team	Year	G	W	L	T	Pts	Finish	W	L	T	Win %	Result
MTL	1926–27	44	28	14	2	58	2nd in Canadian	1	1	2	.500	Lost in semifinals (OTS)
MTL	1927–28	44	26	11	7	59	1st in Canadian	0	1	1	.250	Lost in semifinals (MTM)
MTL	1928–29	44	22	7	15	59	1st in Canadian	0	3		.000	Lost in semifinals (BOS)
MTL	1929–30	44	21	14	9	51	2nd in Canadian	5	0	1	.917	Won Stanley Cup (BOS)
MTL	1930–31	44	26	10	8	60	1st in Canadian	6	4		.600	Won Stanley Cup (CHI)
MTL	1931–32	48	25	16	7	57	1st in Canadian	1	3		.250	Lost in semifinals (NYR)
MTL	1936–37	48	24	18	6	54	1st in Canadian	2	3		.400	Lost in semifinals (DET)
MTL	1937–38	48	18	17	13	49	3rd in Canadian	1	2		.333	Lost in quarterfinals (CHI)
MTL	1938–39	30	6	18	6	(18)	(fired)	–	–	–	–	–
NHL Total		394	196	125	73			17	16	4		2 Stanley Cup titles

Preceded by Position created	Head coach of the Montreal Maroons; 1924–25	Succeeded by Eddie Gerard
Preceded by Leo Dandurand	Head coach of the Montreal Canadiens; 1926–32	Succeeded by Newsy Lalonde
Preceded by Sylvio Mantha	Head coach of the Montreal Canadiens; 1936–39	Succeeded by Jules Dugal
Preceded by Ernest Savard	General Manager of the Montreal Canadiens; 1936–39	Succeeded by Jules Dugal
