= Pick 6 =

Pick 6 may refer to:

- Pick 6 (horse racing), a wager in which a bettor picks one horse in each of six races
- Pick 6 (lottery), a game in which six numbers are picked
- Pick-six, an interception returned for a touchdown in gridiron football
- "Pick Six", a ranking system used by Ring of Honor to determine championship contenders
