= Hart Memorial Trophy =

Ice hockey award

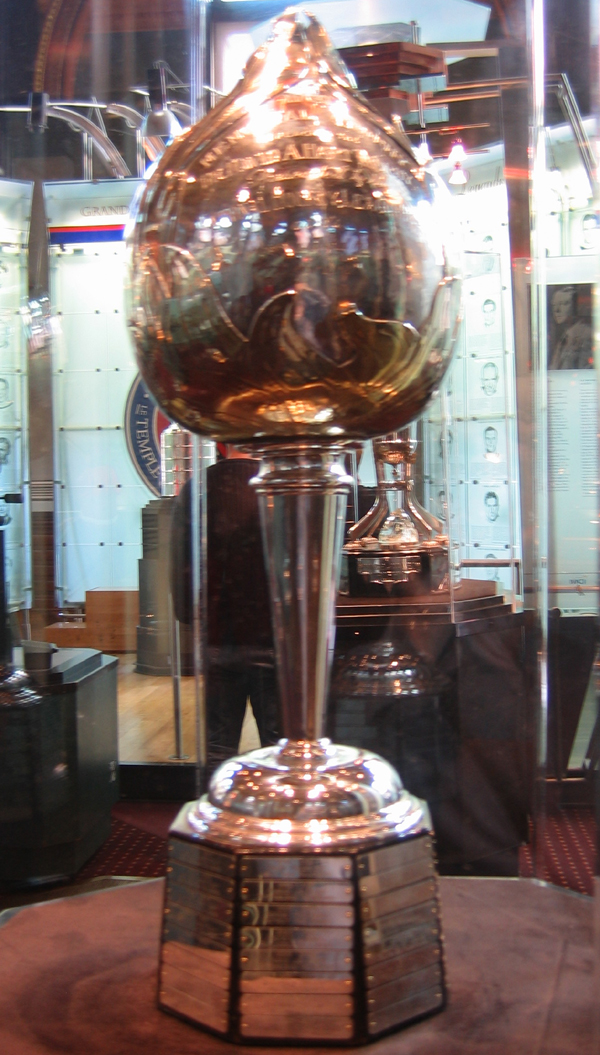
- Sport: Ice hockey
- Awarded for: Most Valuable Player to his team in regular season of the National Hockey League

History
- First award: 1924
- First winner: Frank Nighbor
- Most wins: Wayne Gretzky (9)
- Most recent: Nikita Kucherov; Tampa Bay Lightning

The Hart Memorial Trophy, originally known as the Hart Trophy, is an annual award for the most valuable player to his team in the National Hockey League (NHL), voted by the members of the Professional Hockey Writers' Association. The original trophy was donated to the league in 1923 by David Hart, the father of Cecil Hart, the longtime head coach of the Montreal Canadiens. The Hart Trophy has been awarded 99 times to 61 different players since its beginnings in 1923–24.

== History ==
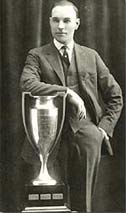
The first winner of the original trophy, Frank Nighbor

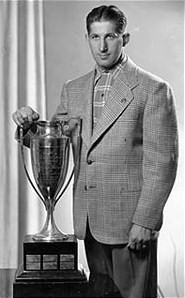
Elmer Lach with the original trophy in 1945

The Hart Memorial Trophy is named in honour of Canadian Dr. David Hart. Dr. Hart, who donated the original trophy to the NHL, was the father of Cecil Hart, a former coach and general manager of the Montreal Canadiens. The trophy was first awarded at the conclusion of the 1923–24 NHL season to Frank Nighbor of the Ottawa Senators. The original Hart Trophy was retired to the Hockey Hall of Fame in 1960, and the NHL began presenting a new trophy, which was dubbed the Hart Memorial Trophy in its place.

Wayne Gretzky won the award a record nine times during his career, eight consecutively. Gretzky and his Edmonton Oilers teammate Mark Messier are the only players to win the Hart Trophy with more than one team. Eddie Shore and Herb Gardiner are the oldest winners of the award, each winning it at the age of 35. There have been two unanimous MVP wins, both with the Edmonton Oilers: Wayne Gretzky for the 1981–82 NHL season and Connor McDavid during the 2020–21 NHL season.

Players from the Montreal Canadiens have won the award seventeen times; players from the Boston Bruins and Edmonton Oilers are second with thirteen winners. Joe Thornton became the only Hart Trophy winner to have switched clubs during his winning campaign during the 2005–06 season, having played for both the Bruins and San Jose Sharks that year. The defenseman with the most trophy victories is Eddie Shore, who won four times with Boston. By contrast, it is rare for a goaltender to win the award; only eight different goaltenders have won the Hart Trophy, nine times, with Buffalo Sabres goaltender Dominik Hasek being the only two-time winner at that position.

The first American to win the award is two-fold depending on the definition. Billy Burch was the first player born in America (specifically Yonkers, New York) to win the award, doing so in 1925, but he identified himself as a Canadian due to living there from a young age. The first born-and-raised-American to win the award was Patrick Kane in 2016.

== Voting ==
The voting is conducted at the end of the regular season by members of the Professional Hockey Writers' Association, and each voter ranks their top five candidates on a 10-7-5-3-1 point(s) system. Three finalists are named and the trophy is awarded at the NHL Awards ceremony after the playoffs.

The closest the voting for the Hart Trophy has ever come was in the 2001–02 season, when Jose Theodore and Jarome Iginla tied in the total voting. The tiebreaker for choosing the Hart Trophy winner in such a case is number of first-place votes: Theodore claimed it as he had 86 first-place votes to Iginla's 82.

== Winners ==
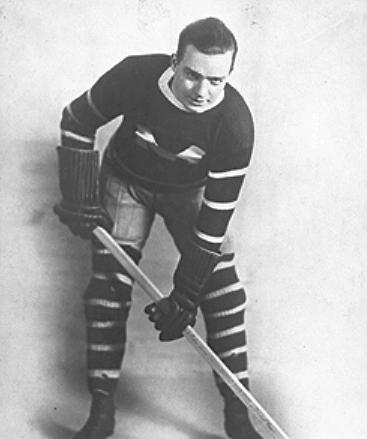
Nels Stewart, first two-time winner

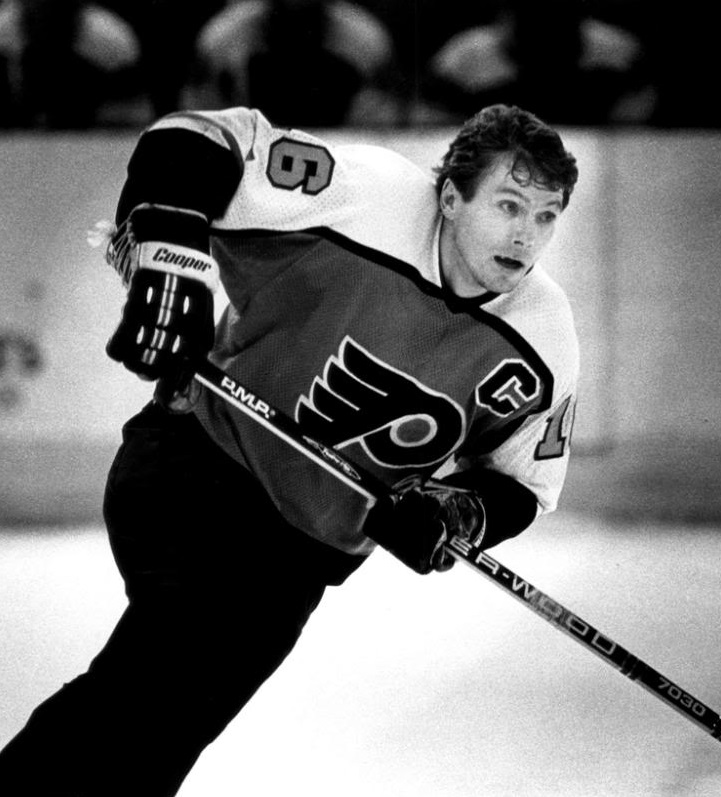
Bobby Clarke, three-time winner

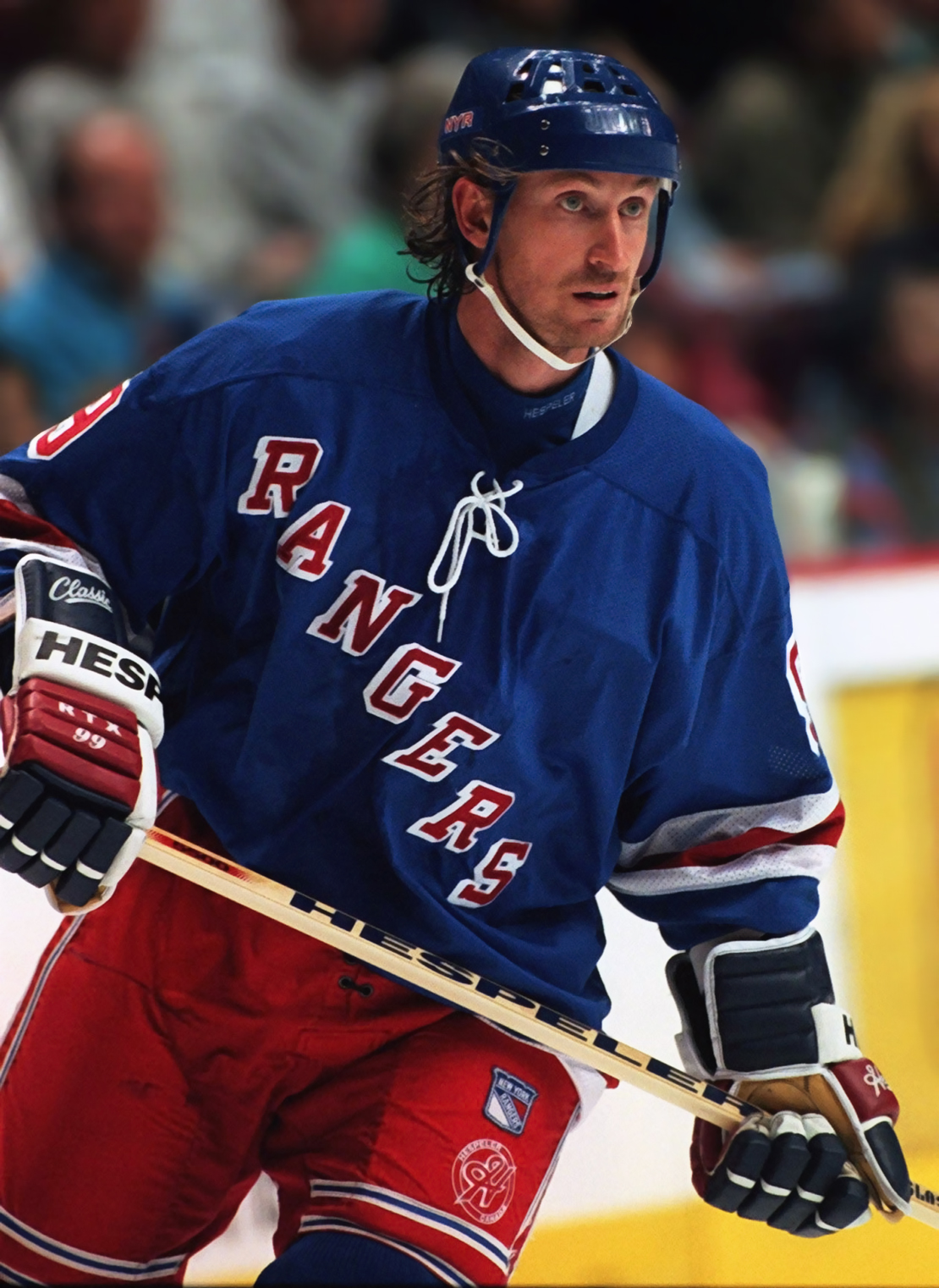
Wayne Gretzky, record nine-time winner

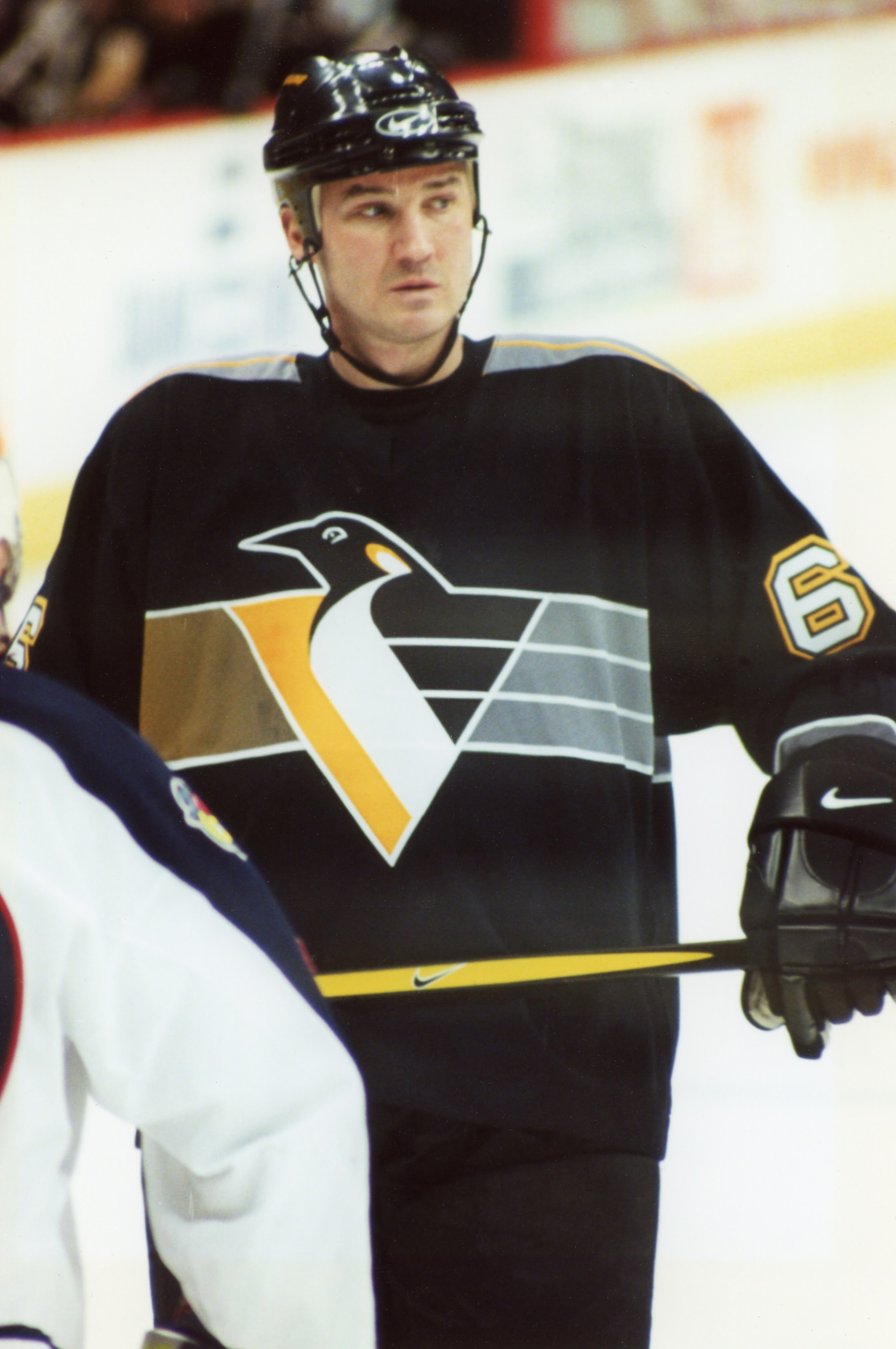
Mario Lemieux, three-time winner

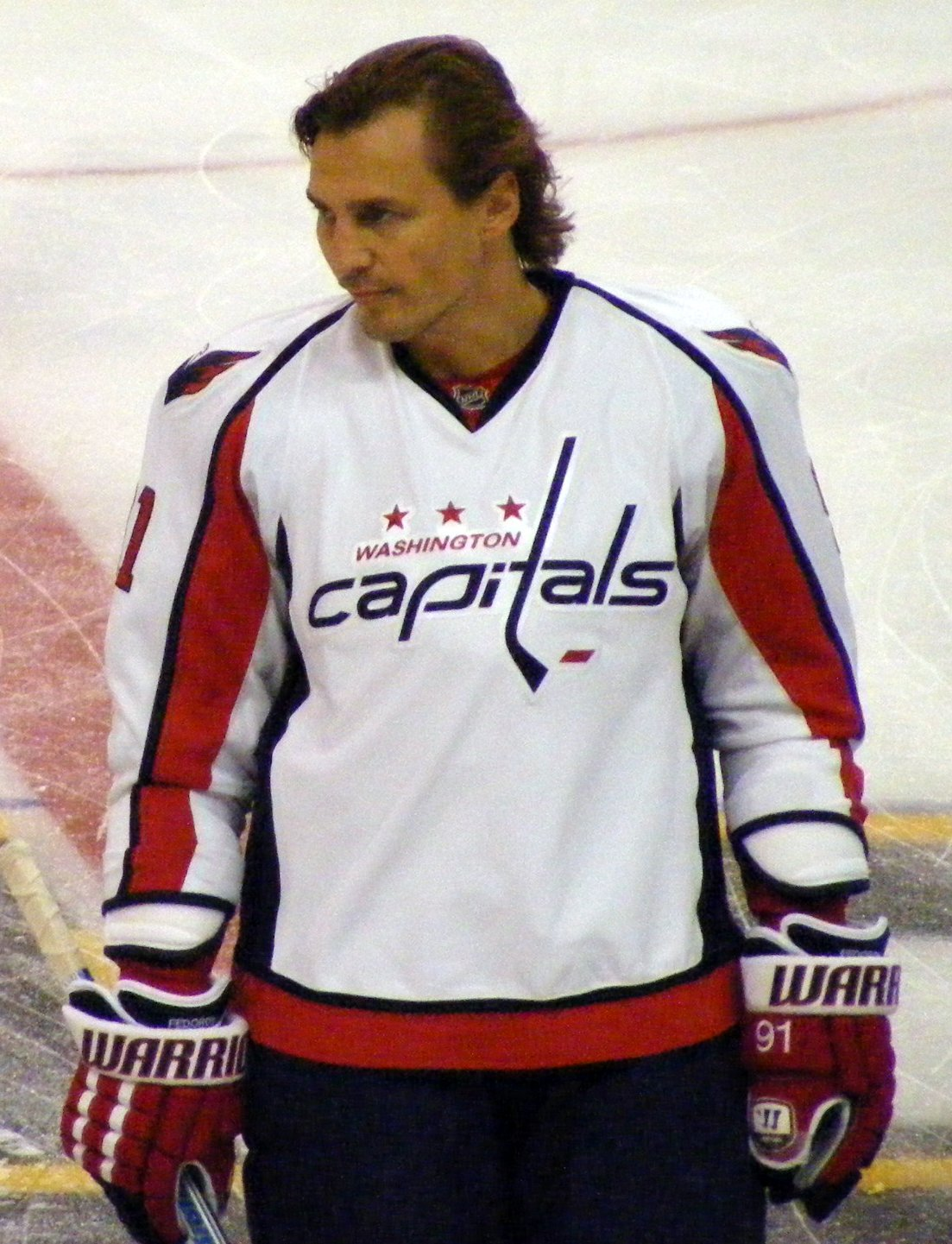
Sergei Fedorov, first European-trained Hart-winning player, one-time winner

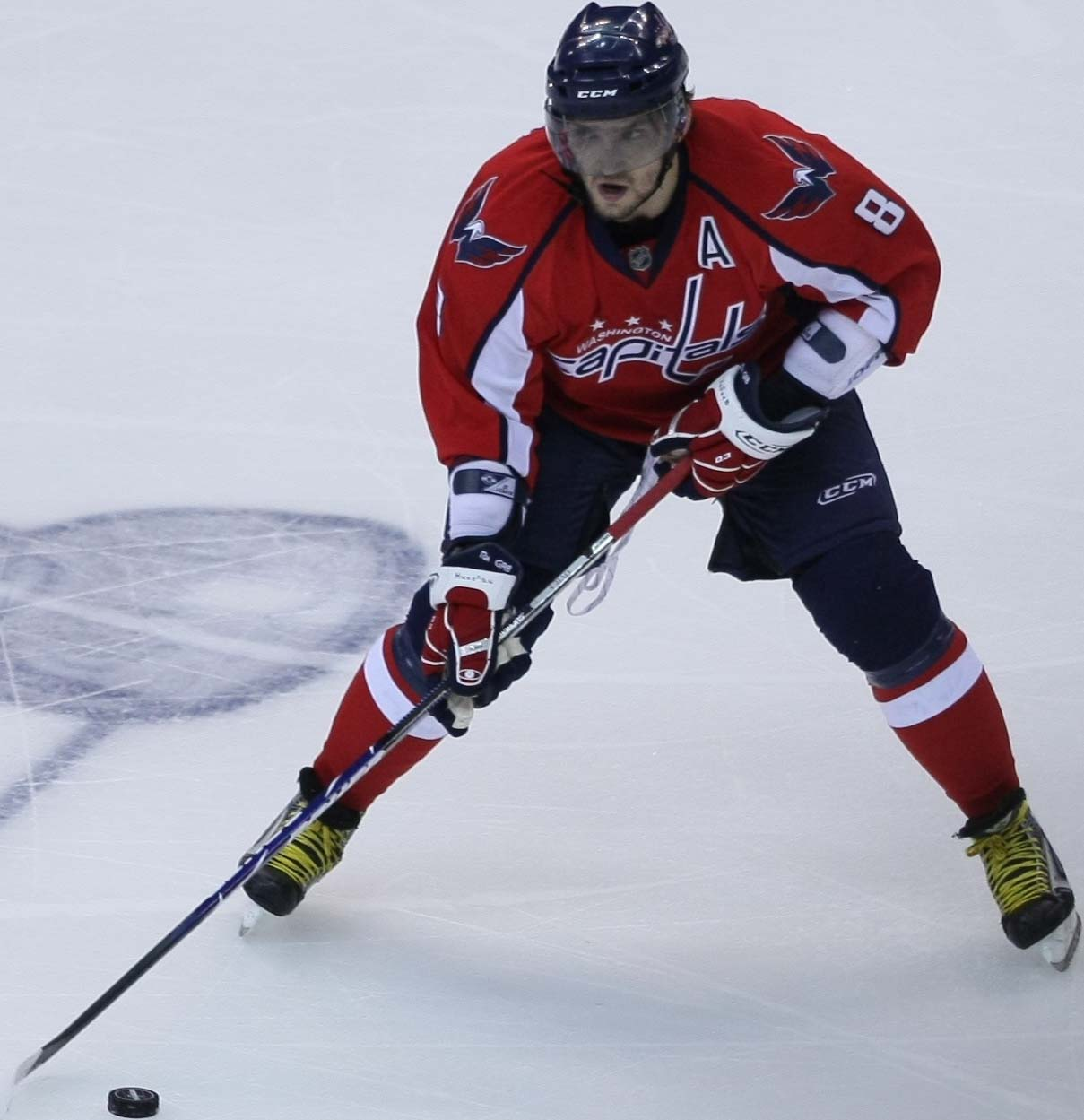
Alexander Ovechkin, three-time winner

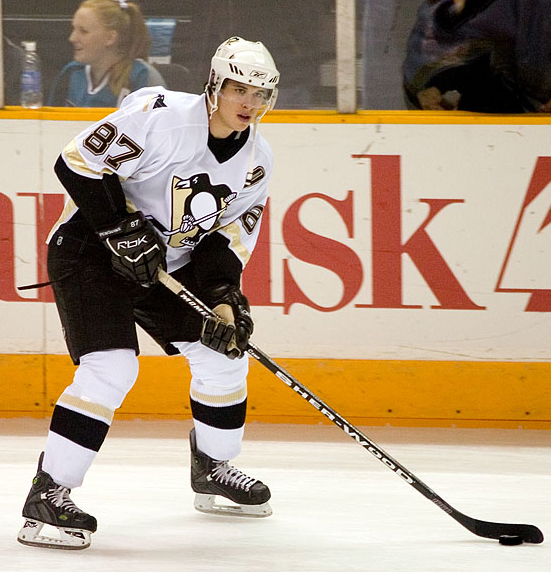
Sidney Crosby, two-time winner

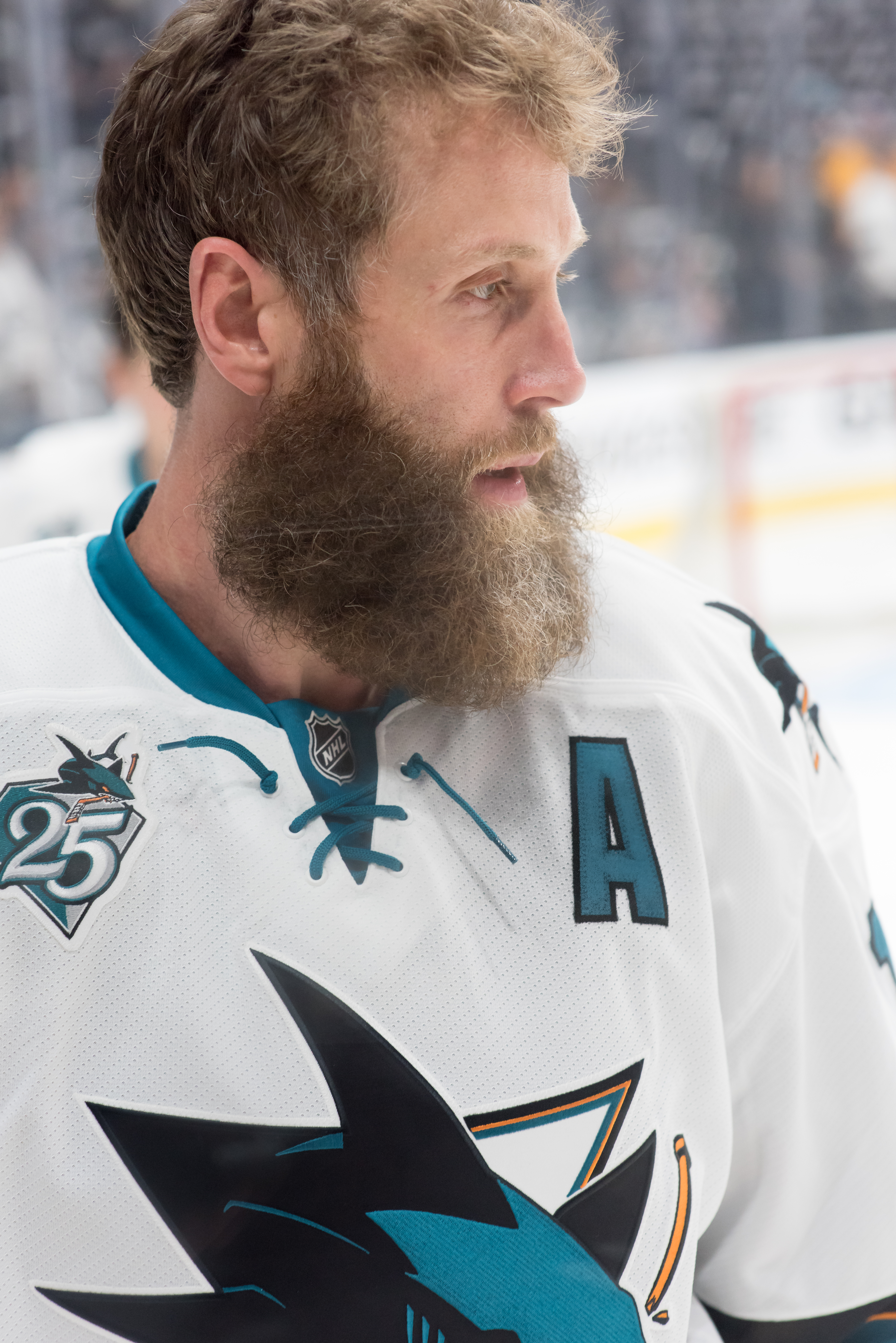
Joe Thornton, the only player to switch clubs during his winning season, one-time winner

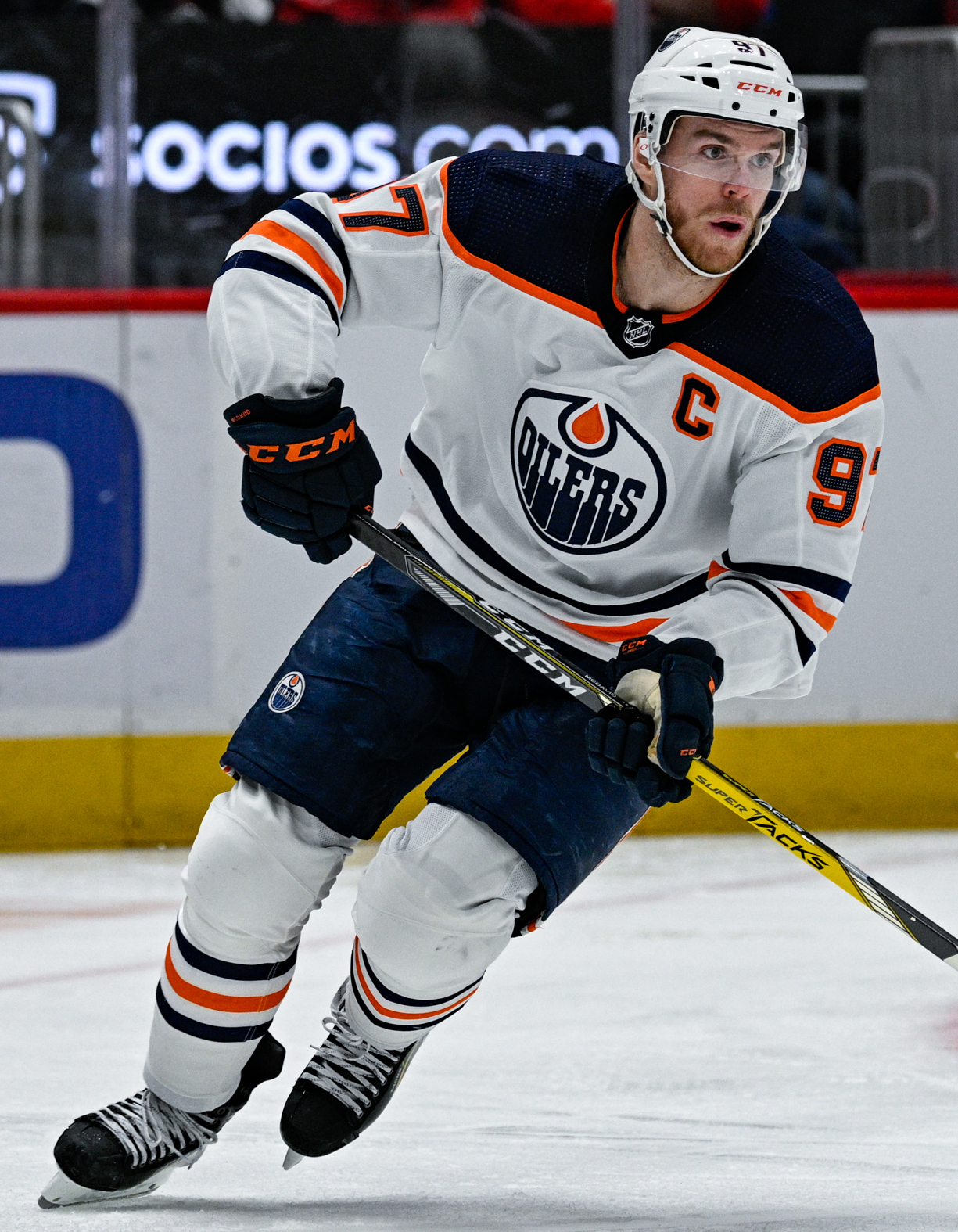
Connor McDavid, three-time winner

| ^ | Denotes player who is still active in the NHL |
| * | Denotes player inducted into the Hockey Hall of Fame |
| ~ | Denotes inactive player not yet eligible for Hockey Hall of Fame consideration |
| † | Denotes player whose team won the Stanley Cup that year |
| Player (X) | Denotes the number of times the player had won the Hart Trophy at that time |
| Team (X) | Denotes the number of times a player from this team had won at that time |

| Season | Player | Position | Team |
|---|---|---|---|
| 1923–24 | Frank Nighbor* | Centre | Ottawa Senators |
| 1924–25 | Billy Burch* | Centre | Hamilton Tigers |
| 1925–26† | Nels Stewart* | Centre | Montreal Maroons |
| 1926–27 | Herb Gardiner* | Defenceman | Montreal Canadiens |
| 1927–28 | Howie Morenz* | Centre | Montreal Canadiens (2) |
| 1928–29 | Roy Worters* | Goaltender | New York Americans |
| 1929–30 | Nels Stewart* (2) | Centre | Montreal Maroons (2) |
| 1930–31† | Howie Morenz* (2) | Centre | Montreal Canadiens (3) |
| 1931–32 | Howie Morenz* (3) | Centre | Montreal Canadiens (4) |
| 1932–33 | Eddie Shore* | Defenceman | Boston Bruins |
| 1933–34 | Aurele Joliat* | Left wing | Montreal Canadiens (5) |
| 1934–35 | Eddie Shore* (2) | Defenceman | Boston Bruins (2) |
| 1935–36 | Eddie Shore* (3) | Defenceman | Boston Bruins (3) |
| 1936–37 | Babe Siebert* | Defenceman | Montreal Canadiens (6) |
| 1937–38 | Eddie Shore* (4) | Defenceman | Boston Bruins (4) |
| 1938–39 | Toe Blake* | Left wing | Montreal Canadiens (7) |
| 1939–40 | Ebbie Goodfellow* | Defenceman | Detroit Red Wings |
| 1940–41† | Bill Cowley* | Centre | Boston Bruins (5) |
| 1941–42 | Tommy Anderson | Defenceman | Brooklyn Americans |
| 1942–43 | Bill Cowley* (2) | Centre | Boston Bruins (6) |
| 1943–44 | Babe Pratt* | Defenceman | Toronto Maple Leafs |
| 1944–45 | Elmer Lach* | Centre | Montreal Canadiens (8) |
| 1945–46 | Max Bentley* | Centre | Chicago Black Hawks |
| 1946–47 | Maurice Richard* | Right wing | Montreal Canadiens (9) |
| 1947–48 | Buddy O'Connor* | Centre | New York Rangers |
| 1948–49 | Sid Abel* | Centre | Detroit Red Wings (2) |
| 1949–50 | Chuck Rayner* | Goaltender | New York Rangers (2) |
| 1950–51 | Milt Schmidt* | Centre | Boston Bruins (7) |
| 1951–52† | Gordie Howe* | Right wing | Detroit Red Wings (3) |
| 1952–53 | Gordie Howe* (2) | Right wing | Detroit Red Wings (4) |
| 1953–54 | Al Rollins | Goaltender | Chicago Black Hawks (2) |
| 1954–55 | Ted Kennedy* | Centre | Toronto Maple Leafs (2) |
| 1955–56† | Jean Beliveau* | Centre | Montreal Canadiens (10) |
| 1956–57 | Gordie Howe* (3) | Right wing | Detroit Red Wings (5) |
| 1957–58 | Gordie Howe* (4) | Right wing | Detroit Red Wings (6) |
| 1958–59 | Andy Bathgate* | Right wing | New York Rangers (3) |
| 1959–60 | Gordie Howe* (5) | Right wing | Detroit Red Wings (7) |
| 1960–61 | Bernie Geoffrion* | Right wing | Montreal Canadiens (11) |
| 1961–62 | Jacques Plante* | Goaltender | Montreal Canadiens (12) |
| 1962–63 | Gordie Howe* (6) | Right wing | Detroit Red Wings (8) |
| 1963–64 | Jean Beliveau* (2) | Centre | Montreal Canadiens (13) |
| 1964–65 | Bobby Hull* | Left wing | Chicago Black Hawks (3) |
| 1965–66 | Bobby Hull* (2) | Left wing | Chicago Black Hawks (4) |
| 1966–67 | Stan Mikita* | Centre | Chicago Black Hawks (5) |
| 1967–68 | Stan Mikita* (2) | Centre | Chicago Black Hawks (6) |
| 1968–69 | Phil Esposito* | Centre | Boston Bruins (8) |
| 1969–70† | Bobby Orr* | Defenceman | Boston Bruins (9) |
| 1970–71 | Bobby Orr* (2) | Defenceman | Boston Bruins (10) |
| 1971–72† | Bobby Orr* (3) | Defenceman | Boston Bruins (11) |
| 1972–73 | Bobby Clarke* | Centre | Philadelphia Flyers |
| 1973–74 | Phil Esposito* (2) | Centre | Boston Bruins (12) |
| 1974–75† | Bobby Clarke* (2) | Centre | Philadelphia Flyers (2) |
| 1975–76 | Bobby Clarke* (3) | Centre | Philadelphia Flyers (3) |
| 1976–77† | Guy Lafleur* | Right wing | Montreal Canadiens (14) |
| 1977–78† | Guy Lafleur* (2) | Right wing | Montreal Canadiens (15) |
| 1978–79 | Bryan Trottier* | Centre | New York Islanders |
| 1979–80 | Wayne Gretzky* | Centre | Edmonton Oilers |
| 1980–81 | Wayne Gretzky* (2) | Centre | Edmonton Oilers (2) |
| 1981–82 | Wayne Gretzky* (3) | Centre | Edmonton Oilers (3) |
| 1982–83 | Wayne Gretzky* (4) | Centre | Edmonton Oilers (4) |
| 1983–84† | Wayne Gretzky* (5) | Centre | Edmonton Oilers (5) |
| 1984–85† | Wayne Gretzky* (6) | Centre | Edmonton Oilers (6) |
| 1985–86 | Wayne Gretzky* (7) | Centre | Edmonton Oilers (7) |
| 1986–87† | Wayne Gretzky* (8) | Centre | Edmonton Oilers (8) |
| 1987–88 | Mario Lemieux* | Centre | Pittsburgh Penguins |
| 1988–89 | Wayne Gretzky* (9) | Centre | Los Angeles Kings |
| 1989–90† | Mark Messier* | Centre | Edmonton Oilers (9) |
| 1990–91 | Brett Hull* | Right wing | St. Louis Blues |
| 1991–92 | Mark Messier* (2) | Centre | New York Rangers (4) |
| 1992–93 | Mario Lemieux* (2) | Centre | Pittsburgh Penguins (2) |
| 1993–94 | Sergei Fedorov* | Centre | Detroit Red Wings (9) |
| 1994–95 | Eric Lindros* | Centre | Philadelphia Flyers (4) |
| 1995–96 | Mario Lemieux* (3) | Centre | Pittsburgh Penguins (3) |
| 1996–97 | Dominik Hašek* | Goaltender | Buffalo Sabres |
| 1997–98 | Dominik Hašek* (2) | Goaltender | Buffalo Sabres (2) |
| 1998–99 | Jaromír Jágr~ | Right wing | Pittsburgh Penguins (4) |
| 1999–2000 | Chris Pronger* | Defenceman | St. Louis Blues (2) |
| 2000–01† | Joe Sakic* | Centre | Colorado Avalanche |
| 2001–02 | Jose Theodore | Goaltender | Montreal Canadiens (16) |
| 2002–03 | Peter Forsberg* | Centre | Colorado Avalanche (2) |
| 2003–04† | Martin St. Louis* | Right wing | Tampa Bay Lightning |
| 2004–05 | Season cancelled due to the 2004–05 NHL lockout | | |
| 2005–06 | Joe Thornton* | Centre | Boston Bruins (13) / San Jose Sharks (Note: The 2005–06 winner, Joe Thornton, was traded from the Boston Bruins to the San Jose Sharks mid-season. To date, he is the only winner to have played for multiple teams during his winning season.) |
| 2006–07 | Sidney Crosby^ | Centre | Pittsburgh Penguins (5) |
| 2007–08 | Alexander Ovechkin^ | Left wing | Washington Capitals |
| 2008–09 | Alexander Ovechkin^ (2) | Left wing | Washington Capitals (2) |
| 2009–10 | Henrik Sedin* | Centre | Vancouver Canucks |
| 2010–11 | Corey Perry^ | Right wing | Anaheim Ducks |
| 2011–12 | Evgeni Malkin^ | Centre | Pittsburgh Penguins (6) |
| 2012–13 | Alexander Ovechkin^ (3) | Right wing | Washington Capitals (3) |
| 2013–14 | Sidney Crosby^ (2) | Centre | Pittsburgh Penguins (7) |
| 2014–15 | Carey Price* | Goaltender | Montreal Canadiens (17) |
| 2015–16 | Patrick Kane^ | Right wing | Chicago Blackhawks (7) |
| 2016–17 | Connor McDavid^ | Centre | Edmonton Oilers (10) |
| 2017–18 | Taylor Hall^ | Left wing | New Jersey Devils |
| 2018–19 | Nikita Kucherov^ | Right wing | Tampa Bay Lightning (2) |
| 2019–20 | Leon Draisaitl^ | Centre | Edmonton Oilers (11) |
| 2020–21 | Connor McDavid^ (2) | Centre | Edmonton Oilers (12) |
| 2021–22 | Auston Matthews^ | Centre | Toronto Maple Leafs (3) |
| 2022–23 | Connor McDavid^ (3) | Centre | Edmonton Oilers (13) |
| 2023–24 | Nathan MacKinnon^ | Centre | Colorado Avalanche (3) |
| 2024–25 | Connor Hellebuyck^ | Goaltender | Winnipeg Jets |
| 2025–26 | Nikita Kucherov^ (2) | Right wing | Tampa Bay Lightning (3) |

== See also ==
- Ted Lindsay Award
- List of NHL statistical leaders
