= Joseph Cattarinich =

- Hockey Hall of Fame, 1977 (Builder)
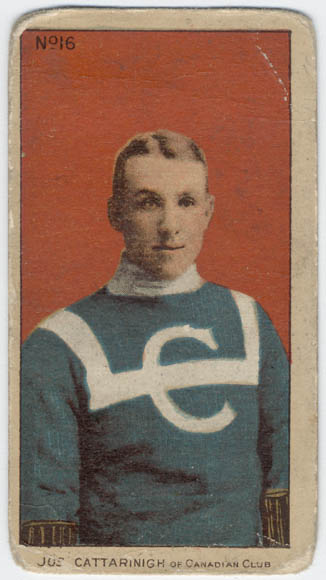
- A cigarette pack hockey card showing Cattarinich in the original Canadiens uniform of 1909–10.
- Born: November 13, 1881 Quebec City, Quebec, Canada
- Died: December 7, 1938 (aged 57) New Orleans, Louisiana, USA
- Height: 6 ft 0 in (183 cm)
- Weight: 200 lb (91 kg; 14 st 4 lb)
- Position: Goaltender
- Caught: Right
- Played for: Montreal Canadiens; Montreal Le National; Montreal Hockey Club
- Playing career: 1906–1910

Joseph Jean Étienne Stanislas Cattarinich (November 13, 1881 – December 7, 1938), was a Canadian professional Ice hockey player, and co-owner of horse racing tracks in Canada and the United States as well as a co-owner of the Montreal Canadiens of the National Hockey League.

== Biography ==
=== Sports career ===
Cattarinich grew up in Quebec City and played ice hockey and lacrosse as a young man. Later, he lived in Levis near Quebec City. He is best known as the first goaltender of the professional Montreal Canadiens, then known as 'Les Canadiens', playing for the team during the inaugural 1910 National Hockey Association (NHA) season. He retired after Georges Vézina shut out Cattarinich's club in a game with Vézina's amateur Chicoutimi team (the Canadiens had been on a pre-season barnstorming tour to promote the upcoming season of the NHA. He was so impressed that he recommended the Canadiens sign Vézina and voluntarily stepped down from his place on the team. In those days, ice hockey teams carried only one goaltender, as a rule.

=== Business career ===
With longtime business partner Leo Dandurand, Cattarinich became prominent in the Montreal tobacco wholesaling business, but it was their popularization of the Parimutuel betting system at local tracks that provided their greatest commercial success. With the re-introduction of race track betting in the United States after World War I, the pair, known popularly as "Catta-Léo", extended their activities to racetracks in Chicago, Jefferson Parish, Louisiana, New Orleans, and others in St. Louis and further afield.

In 1921, along with Dandurand and Louis Letourneau, Cattarinich purchased the Montreal Canadiens of the National Hockey League from the estate of George Kennedy for $11,000. Although Dandurand was the active partner during their tenure (Cattarinich was known as "The Silent One" and Letourneau sold his stake in 1930), the Canadiens won three Stanley Cups with players such as Howie Morenz, Aurel Joliat, and Georges Vezina. After a series of losses (amounting to $40,000 for the 1934–35 season alone), Cattarinich and Dandurand sold the club to a syndicate comprising J. Ernest Savard, Maurice Forget, and Louis Gélinas in 1935 for $165,000.

In 1932, Cattarinich, Dandurand, and Letourneau purchased Blue Bonnets Raceway. A shareholder with Robert S. Eddy, Jr. and others in Arlington Park racetrack in Chicago and Jefferson Park Racetrack in Jefferson Parish, Louisiana, in 1934 their group purchased the Fair Grounds Race Course in New Orleans from prominent horseman Edward R. Bradley. Cattarinich and Dandurand continued their betting business throughout the challenging economic environment of the Great Depression in the 1930s. Despite several attempts, they did not succeed in acquiring another NHL club.

While recovering from an eye operation, he suffered a heart attack and died on December 7, 1938, in New Orleans. Catarinich is buried in Notre-Dame-des-Neiges Cemetery in Montreal, Quebec.

He is a member of the Hockey Hall of Fame, inducted in 1977 as a builder.

Preceded by Position created	Head coach of the Montreal Canadiens; 1910–11	Succeeded by Adolphe Lecours
Preceded by Position created	General Manager of the Montreal Canadiens; 1909–10 with Jack Laviolette	Succeeded by George Kennedy
