= Léo Dandurand =

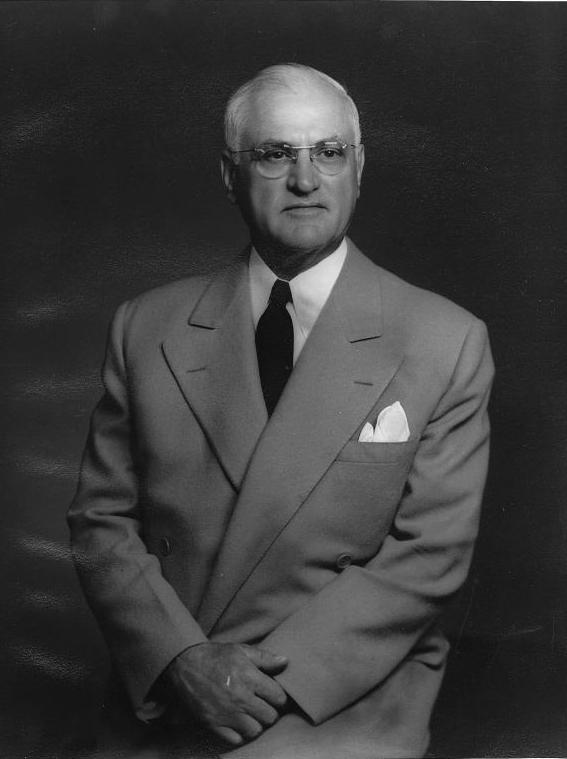
- Dandurand in 1949
- Born: Joseph Viateur Dandurand; July 9, 1889; Bourbonnais, Illinois, U.S.
- Died: June 26, 1964 (aged 74); Montreal, Quebec, Canada
- Occupations: businessman, sportsman
- Known for: Owner of Montreal Canadiens

Joseph Viateur "Léo" Dandurand (July 9, 1889 – June 26, 1964), was an American-Canadian sportsman and businessman. He was the owner and coach of the Montreal Canadiens ice hockey team in the National Hockey League (NHL). He also was an owner of race tracks and of the Montreal Alouettes football team in the league that evolved into the Canadian Football League (CFL).

== Personal life ==
Dandurand was born in Bourbonnais, Illinois, with most of his family either migrating or born there:

- Great grandfather Christome Marcel Dandurand (1784–1865) was born in Baie-Saint-Paul, Quebec, and died in Bourbonnais in 1865.
- Grandfather Luc Dandurand was born in La Prairie, Quebec, in 1827, and died in 1903 in Kankakee, Illinois.
- Father Francois Xavier Dandurand (1859–1896) lived in Illinois his entire life.

He moved to Canada when he was 16 years old and attended St. Mary's College where he was an athlete in baseball, hockey and lacrosse. After graduating, he became involved in real estate and later in wholesale tobacco in the Montreal area. His first sports investment was the Kempton Park racetrack in Laprairie. After his retirement from professional sports, he owned a successful restaurant in downtown Montreal. He died of a heart attack on June 26, 1964, at the age of 74. He was entombed at the Notre Dame des Neiges Cemetery in Montreal.

== Ice hockey and the Montreal Canadiens ==
He was a referee in the National Hockey Association and was involved with the St. Jacques minor hockey team in the Montreal area. He was a representative at the founding of the Canadian Amateur Hockey Association in 1914. He is considered the inventor of the rule in ice hockey limiting the number of concurrent penalties to two.

On November 2, 1921, Dandurand and his partners, Joseph Cattarinich and Hilarion Louis Létourneau, purchased the Montreal Canadiens hockey club from the widow of George Kennedy for $11,000. Under their ownership, the Canadiens won the Stanley Cup in 1924, 1930, and 1931. Dandurand coached the team until 1926 and was the coach for the 1934–35 season. Dandurand was also the team's general manager from 1921 until 1935. Létourneau sold his stake in the club in 1930, and Dandurand and Cattarinich continued as owners until selling the team in 1935 for $165,000.

Leo Dandurand was inducted into the Hockey Hall of Fame in 1963 as a builder.

== Other sports interests ==
Along with hockey, Dandurand and his partners were heavily involved with horse racing. In 1932, they bought Blue Bonnets Raceway in Montreal. They owned 17 tracks in Quebec, Ontario, New York, Ohio, Delaware, Illinois, Utah, and Louisiana at the time of Cattarinich's death in 1938. In 1931, he introduced the daily double exotic bet at the Connaught Park Racetrack to encourage bettors to attend the early races.

Dandurand was also a boxing and wrestling promoter in Montreal and a director of the Montreal Royals baseball team.

In 1946, Dandurand founded the Montreal Alouettes football team with Eric Cradock and Lew Hayman. In 1949 Montreal Alouettes defeated Calgary Stampeders 28-15 to win the Grey Cup. The team played in the Interprovincial Rugby Football Union, which later became the CFL's east division. Leo Dandurand got name on the Grey Cup as the President of the Alouettes. He only 1 of 6 persons to get their names on the Grey Cup and Stanley Cup. (See Carl Voss, Lionel Conacher, Joe Miller, Norman Kwong & Wayne Gretzky). The Leo Dandurand Trophy is a CFL award presented each year to the most outstanding lineman in the East Division.

== Coaching record ==
| Team | Year | Regular season | | | | | | Post season |
| Team | Year | G | W | L | T | Pts | Division rank | Result |
|---|---|---|---|---|---|---|---|---|
| Montreal Canadiens | 1921–22 | 17 | 10 | 6 | 1 | (25) | 3rd in NHL | Missed playoffs |
| Montreal Canadiens | 1922–23 | 24 | 13 | 9 | 2 | 28 | 2nd in NHL | Lost in NHL Finals |
| Montreal Canadiens | 1923–24 | 24 | 13 | 11 | 0 | 26 | 2nd in NHL | Won Stanley Cup |
| Montreal Canadiens | 1924–25 | 30 | 17 | 11 | 2 | 36 | 3rd in NHL | Lost in Cup Finals |
| Montreal Canadiens | 1925–26 | 36 | 11 | 24 | 1 | 23 | 7th in NHL | Missed playoffs |
| Montreal Canadiens | 1934–35 | 32 | 14 | 15 | 3 | (44) | 3rd in Canadian | Lost in quarterfinals |
| NHL Total | | 163 | 78 | 76 | 9 | | | |

| Preceded by Édouard Lalonde | Head coach of the Montreal Canadiens; 1921–26 | Succeeded by Cecil Hart |
| Preceded by Édouard Lalonde | Head coach of the Montreal Canadiens; 1934–35 | Succeeded by Sylvio Mantha |
| Preceded by George Kennedy | General Manager of the Montreal Canadiens; 1921–35 | Succeeded by Ernest Savard |
