= Jules Dugal =

Canadian ice hockey coach

General Manager of the Montreal Canadiens
- In office 1939–1940
- Preceded by: Cecil Hart
- Succeeded by: Tommy Gorman

Head Coach of the Montreal Canadiens
- In office 1939
- Preceded by: Cecil Hart
- Succeeded by: Babe Siebert

Personal details
- Born: Marie Joseph Jules Dugal; November 25, 1888 Saint-Jean-de-l'Île-d'Orléans, Quebec, Canada
- Died: January 24, 1975 (aged 86) Pompano Beach, Florida, USA
Ice hockey career
- Coached for: Montreal Canadiens (1938-39)

Marie Joseph Jules Dugal (November 25, 1888 – January 24, 1975) was a head coach of the Montreal Canadiens, following Cecil Hart. He managed the team for half of one year, 1939. His record that one year was 9–6–3. The Canadiens made it to the playoffs, but lost in the first round to the Detroit Red Wings, 2 games to 1.

Before becoming head coach Dugal was the team's secretary treasurer from 1922 to 1939 and then briefly as general manager from 1939 to 1940.

== Personal ==
Dugal was born in Saint-Jean-de-l'Île-d'Orléans, Quebec, in 1888 and later studied at Collège de Lévis.

Dugal died January 24, 1976, at Pompano Beach, Florida.

== Coaching record ==
Team	Year	Regular season						Postseason
Team	Year	G	W	L	T	Pts	Division rank	Result
Montreal Canadiens	1938–39	18	9	6	3	21	6th in NHL	1st Round

Preceded by Cecil Hart	Head coach of the Montreal Canadiens; 1939	Succeeded by Babe Siebert
Preceded by Cecil Hart	General Manager of the Montreal Canadiens; 1939–40	Succeeded by Tommy Gorman
