= Tommy Gorman =

Canadian sportsperson (1886–1961)

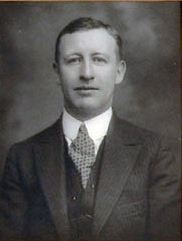
- Gorman in 1921

Personal information
- Born: Thomas Patrick Gorman; June 9, 1886 Ottawa, Ontario, Canada
- Died: May 15, 1961 (aged 74) Ottawa, Ontario, Canada
- Occupation(s): athlete, sports writer, ice hockey executive, entrepreneur
Medal record
Men's lacrosse
Representing Canada
Olympic Games
Gold medal – first place	1908 London	Team

Thomas Patrick Gorman (June 9, 1886 – May 15, 1961), known as "T.P." or "Tommy", was a Canadian ice hockey executive, sports entrepreneur and athlete. Gorman was a founder of the National Hockey League (NHL), won the Stanley Cup seven times as a general manager with four teams, and an Olympic gold medal-winning lacrosse player for Canada.

== Early years ==
Gorman was born in Ottawa, Ontario. He was one of six children born to Thomas Patrick Gorman and Mary K Gorman (née MacDonald). He was a parliamentary page boy as a youth, but sports were his love. He was the youngest member of the Canadian lacrosse team that won the gold medal (only two teams competed) at the 1908 Summer Olympics. He then played professionally for a number of seasons. Gorman became a sports writer at the Ottawa Citizen, eventually becoming the sports editor. He worked at the newspaper until 1921.

== Sports career ==
Even though he had never played hockey, Mr. Gorman was a talented evaluator of talent. Ted Dey, principal owner of the Ottawa Senators of the National Hockey Association, had trouble recruiting players for the 1916–17 season and hired Mr. Gorman to do the task. He did it so capably that he was hired as secretary-treasurer.

In November 1917, Gorman, George Kennedy, Sam Lichtenhein and Mike Quinn all played a part in suspending the NHA and forming the National Hockey League in an effort to rid themselves of Toronto NHA owner Eddie Livingstone. Gorman became the manager and part-owner of the Senators at that time. He helped lead the team to Stanley Cups in 1920, 1921, and 1923. He sold his interest in the Senators in 1925 to Frank Ahearn and became manager-coach of the New York Americans, introducing professional hockey to New York City.

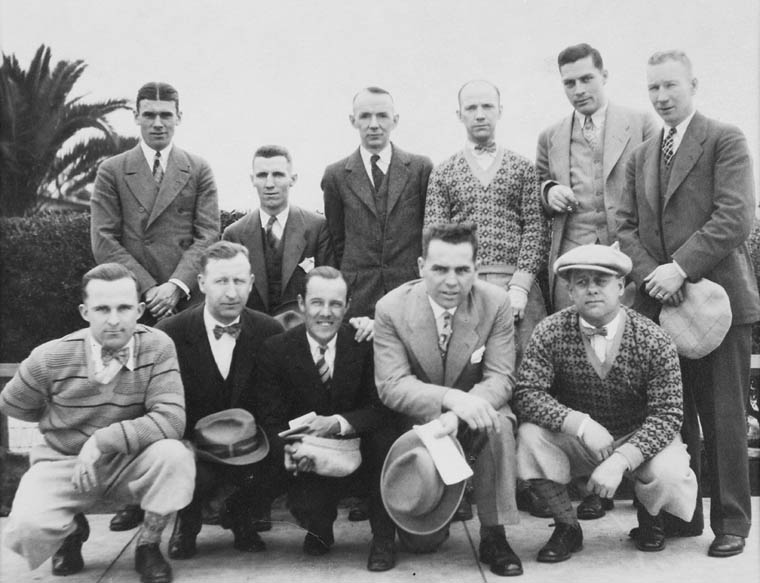
New York Americans visit to Tijuana, Mexico in April 1926. Gorman is second from left, front row.

He resigned from the Americans in 1929 to get involved in horse racing. He managed the Agua Caliente Racetrack in Mexico from 1929 until 1932. In 1932, Gorman brought the horse Phar Lap to Mexico, where the horse won the $100,000 Agua Caliente Handicap before dying under mysterious circumstances in San Francisco. When the president of Agua Caliente sold the racetrack in 1932, Gorman was briefly out of sports.

Late in the 1932–33 season, he was hired as coach of the Chicago Black Hawks and became general manager as well the following season, building a defensive squad around Lionel Conacher and goalie Charlie Gardiner. He took the team from last place in their division in 1932–33 to their first Stanley Cup victory in 1934—despite scoring the fewest goals of any NHL team. Ten days after the Cup victory, Gorman resigned after a dispute with the owner. He went to Montreal as their manager-coach and helped the Montreal Maroons to their final Cup in 1935, thus becoming the first (and only) coach to win consecutive Stanley Cups with different teams. Gorman coached the Maroons until the club folded in 1938. In 1940, he became general manager of the Montreal Canadiens and led them to Cup victories in 1944 and 1946. He is the only person to manage four different teams to championships: the Senators, Black Hawks, Maroons and Canadiens. No other General Manager in the history of the NHL, Major League Baseball, the National Football League, or the National Basketball Association, has won championships with four different teams.

Gorman was also a promoter. One of his flops was after he became manager-coach of the Montreal Maroons when he booked evangelist Aimee Semple McPherson at the Montreal Forum. Few people came. "No one wanted to be saved," he explained. However, some of his better promotions came when he was the Montreal Canadiens general manager. He had Duke Ellington and Frank Sinatra perform at the Forum.

After retiring as general manager of the Canadiens in 1946, Gorman bought the Ottawa Senators of the Quebec Senior Hockey League, managing it to win the Allan Cup in 1949. He took figure skater Barbara Ann Scott on a continental tour after she won the figure skating gold medal at the 1948 Winter Olympics. Gorman revived professional wrestling in Montreal and promoted it in Ottawa, and introduced professional baseball to Ottawa in 1951 with the Ottawa Giants of the International League.

In 1937, he took over management of the Connaught Park Racetrack, a horse race track in Aylmer QC, near Ottawa, of which he had been a part-owner since 1925. Gorman was managing the race track when he died of cancer at a hospital in Ottawa at the age of 74. He was the last living founder of the NHL. He has been inducted into the Hockey Hall of Fame (1963), the Ottawa Sports Hall of Fame (1966), and the Canadian Horse Racing Hall of Fame (1977).

== Coaching record ==
Team	Year	Regular season						Postseason
Team	Year	G	W	L	T	Pts	Division rank	Result
New York Americans	1925–26	36	12	20	4	28	4th in NHL	Did not qualify
New York Americans	1928–29	44	19	13	12	50	2nd in Canadian	Lost in quarter-finals
Chicago Black Hawks	1932–33	25	8	11	6	22	4th in American	Did not qualify
Chicago Black Hawks	1933–34	48	20	17	11	51	2nd in American	Won Stanley Cup
Montreal Maroons	1934–35	48	24	19	5	53	2nd in Canadian	Won Stanley Cup
Montreal Maroons	1935–36	48	22	16	10	54	1st in Canadian	Lost in semi-finals
Montreal Maroons	1936–37	48	22	17	9	53	2nd in Canadian	Lost in semi-finals
Montreal Maroons	1937–38	30	6	19	5	17	4th in Canadian	Did not qualify
NHL totals		327	133	132	62	328	1 division title	2 Stanley Cup wins

== Family ==
Gorman was married in 1910 to Mary Westwick, sister of Rat Westwick, one of the "Silver Seven", and was an uncle to Bill Westwick. They had two daughters and two sons.

After Gorman returned to Ottawa, he and his sons operated the Ottawa Auditorium and Connaught Park. After Gorman's death from cancer in 1961, his sons continued to operate the Auditorium until its demolition in 1967 and Connaught until 1984.

Preceded by Jules Dugal	General manager of the Montreal Canadiens; 1940–46	Succeeded by Frank J. Selke
Preceded by Hamilton Tigers coaches Shorty Green	Head coach of the New York Americans; 1925–26; 1928–29	Succeeded by Newsy Lalonde; Lionel Conacher
Preceded by Godfrey Matheson	Head coach of the Chicago Black Hawks; 1933–34	Succeeded by Clem Loughlin
Preceded by Eddie Gerard; King Clancy	Head coach of the Montreal Maroons; 1934–37; 1938	Succeeded by King Clancy; Position abolished
