= Daily double =

Wager used in horse and dog racing

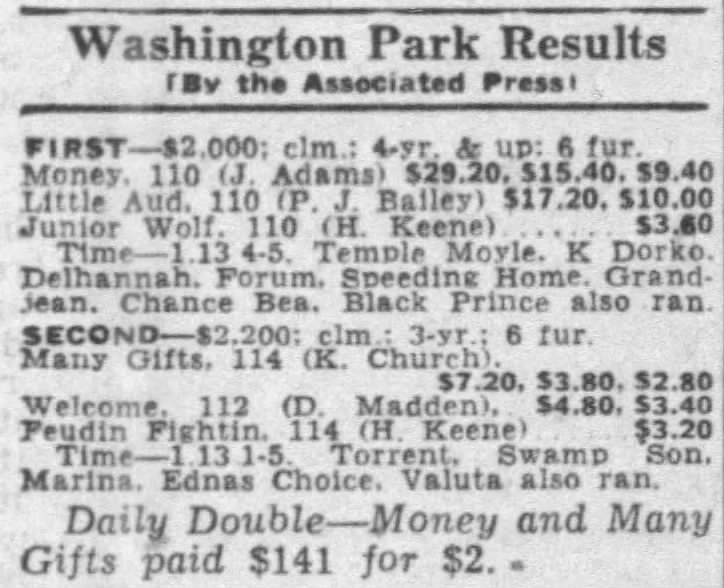
An example of 1950 racing results from Washington Park Race Track highlighting the payout for successful daily double wagers

A daily double is a parimutuel wager offered by horse racing and greyhound racing tracks in North America. Bettors wager on the winners of two consecutive races, pre-designated by the track for a particular race day. The wager is made before either of the two races is run, and is only successful if both of the selections are correct. The daily double is usually the first two races on the program, and most racetracks now also offer a "late double" on the final two races. Daily doubles may also be found in other sports with parimutuel betting, such as jai alai.

== History ==
The daily double was the first so-called "exotic" wager (Note: A bet other than win, place, or show.) offered by North American racetracks. Introduced in 1931 at Connaught Park Racetrack near Ottawa by owner Léo Dandurand, it was noted as being "a fad in England this season." (Note: Newspaper reports of daily doubles in horse racing in Great Britain date to at least 1929.) When first offered on June 3, 1931, on the third and fifth races, a winning $2 wager paid $47.95 ($991.00 in 2024). The following month, daily double betting was introduced at the Hamilton Jockey Club in Hamilton, Ontario, on the second and fourth races of the daily program. In time, racetracks typically offered the wager for the first two races of each day's program, as an enticement for spectators to arrive early for the entire program.

As with all other American racing wagers, the "double" is conducted in parimutuel fashion, but with the number of betting interests in the daily double pool equal to the product of the number of entries in each race. For example, if there are 10 entries in the first race and eight in the second, there will be 80 betting interests, one for each combination of two potential winners. This results in higher payoffs than those found in straight betting for win, place, or show. Due to daily double wagers only having a single takeout, (Note: "Takeout" is commission deducted from pool betting, shared by the track and governing bodies in the form of tax.) winning daily double bets pay off at higher odds than betting both horses to win, or even parlaying them. (Note: For example; as of 2024, Aqueduct Racetrack has an 18.5% takeout on daily double wagers, as compared to a 16% takeout on any win bet. The latter would result in an aggregate takeout of nearly 30% on two win bets, using all proceeds from the first bet to fund the second bet, as 0.84 * 0.84 is 0.7056, which equates to a 29.44% takeout.)

Examples of large payouts on $2 daily double wagers include $10,772 in 1939 ($243,504 in 2024) at Washington Park Race Track in Illinois, $6,683 in 1972 ($50,237 in 2024) at Gulfstream Park in Florida, $8,693.60 in 1990 ($20,924 in 2024) at Freehold Raceway in New Jersey, and $6,953 in 1999 ($13,124 in 2024) at Turf Paradise Race Course in Arizona.

In 1973, American actor and comedian Alan Carney died of a heart attack from the excitement of winning a daily double at Hollywood Park Racetrack in California.

== Variants ==
A "late double" is frequently offered on the day's final two races. Some tracks offer a "rolling double" — a daily double starting on each race on the program except for the last race.

Occasional doubles are offered on important races contested on separate days. The most prominent example is the "Oaks–Derby Double" offered by Churchill Downs, where bettors pick the winners of the Kentucky Oaks and the Kentucky Derby. The Oaks is run the day before the Derby; the latter is traditionally run on the first Saturday of May.

A 1935 newspaper report stated that "daily triple" wagering was offered as part of horse racing in India, and the same was reported in 1949 for horse racing in Denmark. American sportscaster Clem McCarthy opined that "few players of races can tolerate such slow action for their money." Notwithstanding, Santa Anita Park in California introduced daily triple wagering in October 1986.

== Related wagers ==
By 1932, quinella wagering was also being offered by some racetracks, while the exacta did not appear until the mid-1950s. These wagers were typically offered only a few times on each program, largely because of the limitations of electro-mechanical totalisator systems.

When computer technology took over, more exotic wagers were introduced, such as the trifecta, superfecta and "pick 6". The higher payouts for these wagers tended to diminish interest in the daily double, but it is still offered, sometimes more than once during a program.

"Pick 3" and "pick 4" wagers are derived from the daily double. These wagers require bettors to pick the winners of three or four consecutive races, respectively. These are also often offered on a rolling basis — a rolling pick 3 on races one to three, another on races two to four, and so on throughout the program.
