= List of Montreal Canadiens general managers =

Officially known as Le Club de Hockey Canadien, the Montreal Canadiens (French: Les Canadiens de Montréal) are a Canadian professional ice hockey team based in Montreal, Quebec. They play in the Atlantic Division of the Eastern Conference in the National Hockey League (NHL). In 1909, the Canadiens were founded as a charter member of the National Hockey Association (NHA). In 1917, the franchise joined the NHL, and is one of the Original Six teams. In their 100-year history, the Canadiens have won 24 Stanley Cup championships, and are the last Canadian team to have won the Stanley Cup, having done so in 1993. Having played in the Jubilee Arena (1909–1910,1918–1919), the Montreal Arena (1911–1918), the Mount Royal Arena (1919–1926), and the Montreal Forum (1926–1996), the Canadiens have played their home games at the Bell Centre, formerly known as the Molson Centre, since 1996. The team has had eighteen general managers since their inception.

== Key ==
Key of terms and definitions
| Term | Definition |
|---|---|
| No. | Number of general managers^{[a]} |
| Ref(s) | References |
| – | Does not apply |
| † | Elected to the Hockey Hall of Fame in the Builder category |

== General managers ==
General managers of the Montreal Canadiens
| No. | Name | Tenure | Accomplishments during this term | Ref(s) |
|---|---|---|---|---|
| 1 | Joseph Cattarinich† | December 1909 – 1910 | | |
| 1 | Jack Laviolette | December 1909 – 1910 | | |
| 3 | George Kennedy | 1910 – October 19, 1921 | Won Stanley Cup (1916) | |
| 4 | Leo Dandurand† | November 2, 1921 – September 17, 1935 | Won Stanley Cup 3 times in 4 finals appearances (1924, 1925, 1930, 1931); 4 division titles and 12 playoff appearances | |
| 5 | Ernest Savard | September 17, 1935 – 1936 | No playoff appearances | |
| 6 | Cecil Hart | 1936 – 1939 | 1 division title and 3 playoff appearances | |
| 7 | Jules Dugal | 1939 – 1940 | No playoff appearances | |
| 8 | Tommy Gorman† | 1940 – July 1946 | Won Stanley Cup 2 times (1944, 1946); 6 playoff appearances | |
| 9 | Frank J. Selke† | July 10, 1946 – May 15, 1964 | Won Stanley Cup 6 times (1953, 1956, 1957, 1958, 1959, 1960); Lost in Stanley Cup Final 5 times (1947, 1951, 1952, 1954, 1955); 17 playoff appearances | |
| 10 | Sam Pollock† | May 15, 1964 – September 6, 1978 | Won Stanley Cup 9 times (1965, 1966, 1968, 1969, 1971, 1973, 1976, 1977, 1978); Lost in Stanley Cup Final (1967); 3 conference titles, 7 division titles, and 13 playoff appearances | |
| 11 | Irving Grundman | September 6, 1978 – April 14, 1983 | Won Stanley Cup (1979); 2 conference titles, 4 division titles, and 5 playoff appearances | |
| 12 | Serge Savard | April 28, 1983 – October 17, 1995 | Won Stanley Cup 2 times in 3 finals appearances (1986, 1989, 1993); 3 conference titles, 4 division titles, and 11 playoff appearances | |
| 13 | Rejean Houle | October 21, 1995 – November 20, 2000 | 3 playoff appearances | |
| 14 | Andre Savard | November 20, 2000 – June 2, 2003 | 1 playoff appearance | |
| 15 | Bob Gainey | June 2, 2003 – February 8, 2010 | 1 division title and 4 playoff appearances | |
| 16 | Pierre Gauthier | February 8, 2010 – March 29, 2012 | 2 playoff appearances | |
| 17 | Marc Bergevin | May 2, 2012 – November 28, 2021 | Lost in Stanley Cup Final (2021); 3 division titles and 6 playoff appearances | |
| 18 | Kent Hughes | January 18, 2022 – present | 2 playoff appearances; Lost in Conference Final (2026) | |

== See also ==
- List of current NHL general managers

== Notes ==
- ^{a} A running total of the number of general managers of the franchise. Thus any general manager who has two or more separate terms as general manager is only counted once.
