= Pick 6 (horse racing) =

Wager in which a bettor picks one horse in each of six races

A pick 6 is a type of wager offered by horse racing tracks. It requires bettors to select the winners of six consecutive races. Because of the great difficulty in picking six straight winners, plus the number of betting interests involved, payoffs for successful wagers are quite high, sometimes in the millions of dollars.

== Background ==
The pick 6 has its roots in the daily double, the first so-called "exotic" wager offered by horse tracks. To win the daily double, a bettor must pick the winner of two consecutive races, traditionally the first two races or the last two races (a "late double") of the program. The pick 6 merely extends this principle. The wager is offered once per program, and is usually offered on six races which conclude with the featured race of the day. In the United States the most common Pick 6 variant is the Pick 6 Jackpot where one person is supposed to hit.

== Wagering ==
The wager is conducted in parimutuel fashion, with all pick 6 bets going into a separate pool from other kinds of betting. There is one "betting interest" for each available combination, and the number of combinations is equal to the product of the number of runners in all six races. A simplified example: If there are ten horses in each of the six races, then the number of combinations is 10 × 10 × 10 × 10 × 10 × 10, or 1,000,000.

The pick 6 wager actually has two payoffs, one for bettors who pick all six winners, and a smaller payoff for those who pick five out of six. The total pick 6 betting pool is divided by percentage between the two payouts, along the lines of 75% for the six-winner pool and 25% for the five-winner pool.

Because of the sheer difficulty of successfully choosing six straight winners, plus the large number of betting interests, it is common for there to be no winning wager on all six races. When that happens, the six-winner portion of the pool carries over to the following program, and continues to carry over until it is won. This allows the "carryover pool" to grow to large sums, and tracks usually publicize the fact that their carryover pool has grown to six or seven figures. The five-winner pool is paid out each day, however; if no bettors have chosen five out of six winners, then those who have chosen four winners are paid, or even just three winners (which has happened when a series of longshots have won races). The pick 6 pool is also paid out in its entirety on a designated date, such as the last day of a race meet or a day with a guaranteed minimum pool; if there are no six-winner tickets, then the pool is split among five-winner tickets.

== Betting strategy ==
Because of the huge number of betting interests involved, bettors will often try to increase their chances of winning by selecting multiple combinations. This can be costly — a bettor who wants to cover two horses in each race must bet on 2 × 2 × 2 × 2 × 2 × 2 combinations, or 64 combinations, times $2 for each for a total of $128. This method is called "boxing horses," and is also used with other wagers such as a trifecta or superfecta.

The most successful punters invariably use a multiple ticket strategy combined with one or more singles (legs in which they have only selected a single runner). They have in effect constructed multiple scenarios many of which they know in advance will lose. The point being that with each successive leg, as the exotic pick 6 pool sheds tickets, they have several tickets that are still "live" and have a chance of winning the bet or percentage thereof Several punters construct these multiple combinations manually and others use pick six software to assist in the process of construction. The critical components of any strategy invariably revolve around handicapping correctly (picking the contenders) and correctly constructing multiple ticket combinations.

In some countries, such as South Africa, punters are allowed to play a percentage of the bet making it cheaper than in the U.S. where a single line is a minimum of $2. In South Africa, punters can take as little as 1% of a pick 6 ticket and the single line is a minimum of only R1, so that 1,000 combinations can be bet for as little as R10.

== Exceptions ==
=== Late scratches ===
Because all pick 6 wagers must be made before the first of the six races, there are many times when a horse is scratched from a race well after the wager is placed. How this is handled varies according to the rules of the racing jurisdiction. In most cases, the track substitutes the horse that is the post time betting favorite (in the "win" betting pools); if the bettor's original horse is a late scratch and the post time favorite wins, then the bettor is considered to have picked the winner for that race. In other cases, the track may declare combinations involving the scratched horse to have "no action," and the wager is refunded.

=== Races moved from turf to dirt ===
At North American tracks, races which are run on a turf (grass) course must sometimes be moved to the main dirt course, usually due to heavy rain or other adverse weather conditions; sometimes this switch is made after pick 6 wagering is closed. Moving from turf to dirt greatly affects the wagering decisions of astute handicappers, as many horses perform differently according to the racing surface. For pick 6 wagering, different tracks handle this situation in different ways. In New York, a race moved from turf to dirt after pick 6 wagering closes is declared an "all win" race, where picks on any horse in that race are declared successful. If only one race is moved, bettors who successfully pick the other five race winners will win or share the full six-winner pool, including carryovers. If two races are moved, bettors who pick the other four winners will win or share in that day's six-winner pool, but no carryover, and the previous carryover pool only goes to the next program. (Few North American tracks schedule more than two turf races in a program.)

=== Cancelled Races ===
If a portion of pick 6 races were run, but the remaining races were cancelled by the stewards for any reason (weather, gate malfunction, power outage, etc.), any money wagered into the pick 6 pool is distributed among those who have most correct winners. However, no carry-over money is distributed and is carried over to the next race day.
