= Ernest Savard =

Canadian businessman (1896–1971)

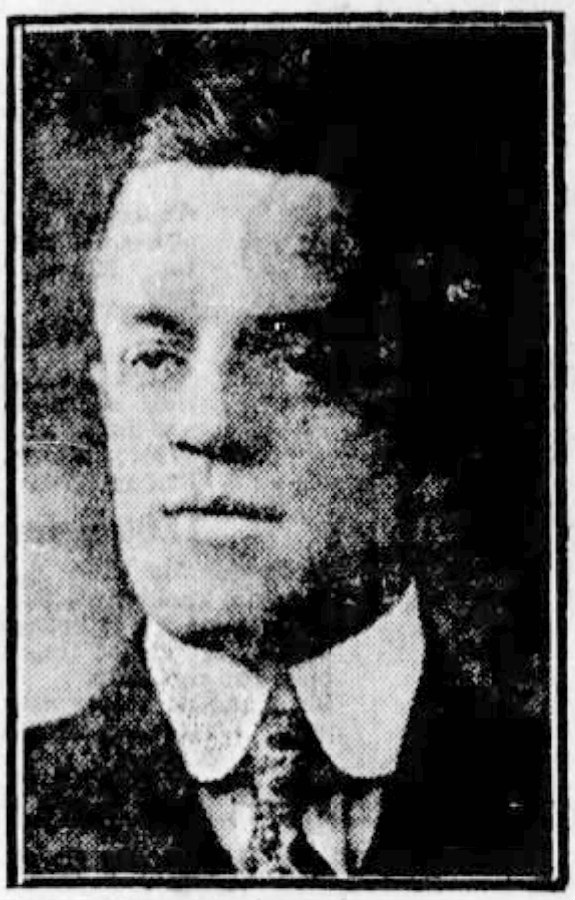
Savard c. 1920

J. S. Ernest Savard (April 17, 1896 – March 12, 1971) was a Canadian businessman. He was a stockbroker and a partner at the brokerage firm of Savard & Hart in Montreal, Quebec. He was also an owner of the Montreal Canadiens and Montreal Royals sports teams.

== Biography ==
A sports fan, in 1928 Savard partnered with fellow Montreal businessman and politician, Athanase David, and American baseball executive, George Stallings, to revive the Montreal Royals baseball franchise as part of the International League and to build Delorimier Stadium.

Savard then bought the Montreal Canadiens hockey franchise, with co-owners Maurice Forget and Louis Gelinas, for $165,000 in September 1935.

Savard succeeded Athanase David as President of the Montreal Canadiens ice hockey club. He also served as general manager for one season. Savard served as team president until 1940, when he was succeeded by Donat Raymond.

Time magazine reported that Savard's business, a member of the Montreal Stock Exchange, suffered considerable financial losses in 1959 as a result of positions it had taken in a deal that turned out to be an orchestrated fraud by American financier, Alexander Guterma.

== Personal ==
Savard was born 1896 in Sainte-Marie-de-Beauce, Quebec and died in 1971 in Largo, Florida.

| Preceded by Léo Dandurand | General Manager of the Montreal Canadiens; 1935–36 | Succeeded by Cecil Hart |
