= George Kennedy (sports promoter) =

Canadian sports promoter (1881 – 1921)

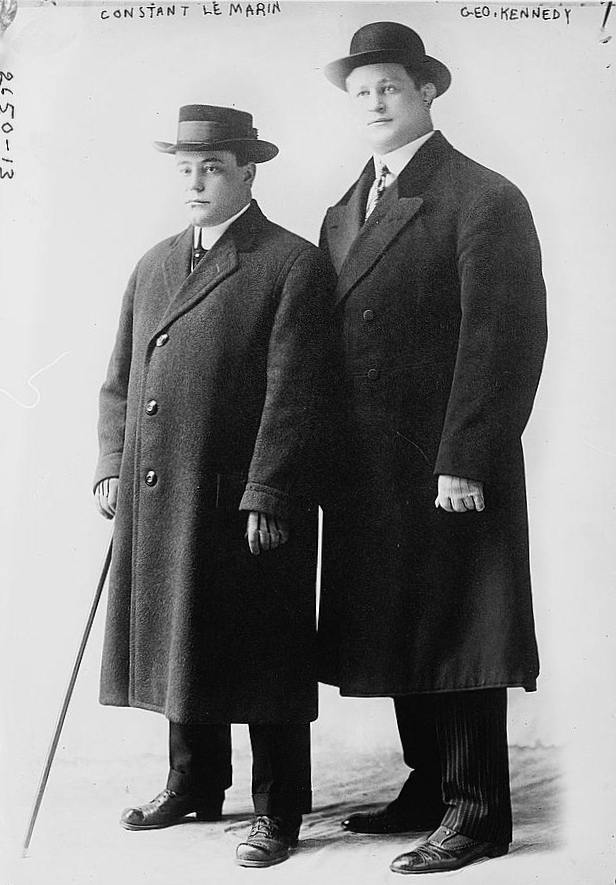
Kendall (on the left) with Belgian wrestler Constant Le Marin around 1913.

George Washington Kendall (December 29, 1881 – October 19, 1921), known professionally as George Kennedy, was a Canadian sports promoter best known as the owner of the Montreal Canadiens ice hockey team from 1910 to 1921. Kennedy was a wrestler himself and after the end of his wrestling career turned to wrestling promotion. Kendall along with other investors, formed the Club Athletique Canadien, and promoted wrestling, boxing, hockey and other sports. He would contract the Spanish flu during the pandemic of the late 1910s and never fully recovered from it, causing him to eventually succumb to complications from the illness in 1921, after the pandemic ended.

== Personal life ==
An Anglo-Quebecer, George W. Kendall was born in Montreal, the son of Jane McClosky, an Irish Roman Catholic and George Hiram Kendall, a Scots-Quebecer and a prominent Baptist who owned a successful manufacturing business. At the time of his parents' marriage, the Catholic Church would only recognize it if her non-Catholic spouse agreed to raise the children in the Catholic faith. As such, George Kendall was educated at the High School of Montreal and then attended the Saint-Laurent College. In 1907, Kendall married Myrtle Agnes Pagels and they had two daughters, one of whom died before the age of one.

== Sports career ==
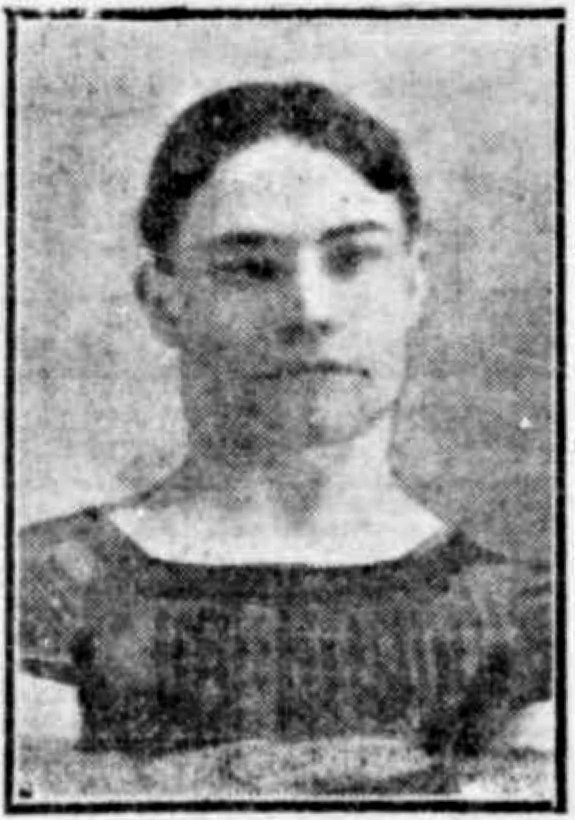
Kendall as a wrestler around 1903

While still in his teens, George Kendall embarked on a career as a wrestler and by age twenty was the top wrestler in his weight class in Canada. Because such activities were something his family frowned upon, he wrestled using the name George Kennedy. An entrepreneur at heart, in 1905 the fluently bilingual "George Kennedy" and friend Joseph-Pierre Gadbois founded Le Club Athlétique Canadien (CAC) to train and develop amateur wrestlers, later adding boxing matches to their promotions.

In 1908, Kendall and Gadbois intended to get into the sport of ice hockey. They attempted to purchase the Montreal Wanderers, but were unsuccessful. The formation of the National Hockey Association (NHA) saw the formation of the 'Les Canadiens' team, which they considered an infringement on the name of their club. In October 1910, Kendall contacted Frank Calder, then the Montreal Herald sports editor, and announced that he wanted an NHA franchise, intending to purchase the Canadiens. If rejected, he would go to court to enforce his rights to the name. The NHA was receptive to Kendall, and on November 12, 1910, he paid J. Ambrose O'Brien $7,500 and took over the Canadiens organization.

A hockey club was only part of Kendall's operations. He had already opened a first-class gymnasium and sports club in the east end of Montreal and had set about promoting wrestling and boxing matches that culminated with the staging of the world wrestling heavyweight championship. In 1915, Kendall purchased the rights to distribute the film of the World Heavyweight Boxing Championship in which Jess Willard dethroned champion Jack Johnson. Now the city's major promoter, Kendall scored another coup for Montreal boxing fans when he arranged a promotional visit to the city by France's wildly popular champion Georges Carpentier who, a few months after his visit, won the World Light Heavyweight Championship.

In 1916, Kendall's hockey team won its first Stanley Cup, but a fire in May destroyed the gymnasium. The loss of the club and the failure of the Montreal Canadians professional lacrosse club forced an end to the CAC. A new organization, the Club de Hockey Canadien, was formed, its principal asset the hockey team, although the new organization continued to promote boxing and wrestling.

In 1917, Kendall was instrumental in the forming of the National Hockey League (NHL). Kendall, along with the owners of the Montreal Wanderers, Ottawa Senators and Quebec Bulldogs was fed up with the disagreements with the Toronto franchise owner, Eddie Livingstone. The group, a majority of the directors of the NHA, voted to suspend the operations of the NHA, and form another professional league without Livingstone. The new league, except for its name, was the same league, having adopted the constitution, trophy and playing rules of the NHA. The suspension of the NHA and the formation of the NHL was intended to be only for a single year, but the dispute with Livingstone dragged on. The NHA's championship trophy, the O'Brien Cup, which the Canadiens had won in 1917, would remain in the care of Kennedy until his death in 1921. Just before the 1918–19 season Kendall and the other NHL owners, met without Livingstone and voted to suspend the NHA permanently.

That same season, Kendall's Canadiens won the championship of the NHL and travelled to Seattle, Washington, to play off for the 1919 Stanley Cup Final. Kendall, along with most of the Canadiens' roster of players, became ill with the Spanish flu and was hospitalized. The series itself was cancelled and Joe Hall of the Canadiens died of the illness four days later.

Kendall himself never fully recovered from the illness and he died at age 39 on October 19, 1921. He was entombed at the Notre Dame des Neiges Cemetery in Montreal. On November 3, 1921, his widow sold the Canadiens hockey team for $11,000 to businessmen Joseph Cattarinich, Leo Dandurand and Louis A. Letourneau.

== See also ==
- History of the National Hockey League (1917–1942)

Sporting positions
Preceded by Joseph Cattarinich; Jack Laviolette	Head coach of the Montreal Canadiens; 1911–21	Succeeded by Leo Dandurand
Preceded by Joseph Cattarinich; Jack Laviolette	General manager of the Montreal Canadiens; 1910–21	Succeeded by Leo Dandurand
