= List of Montreal Canadiens head coaches =

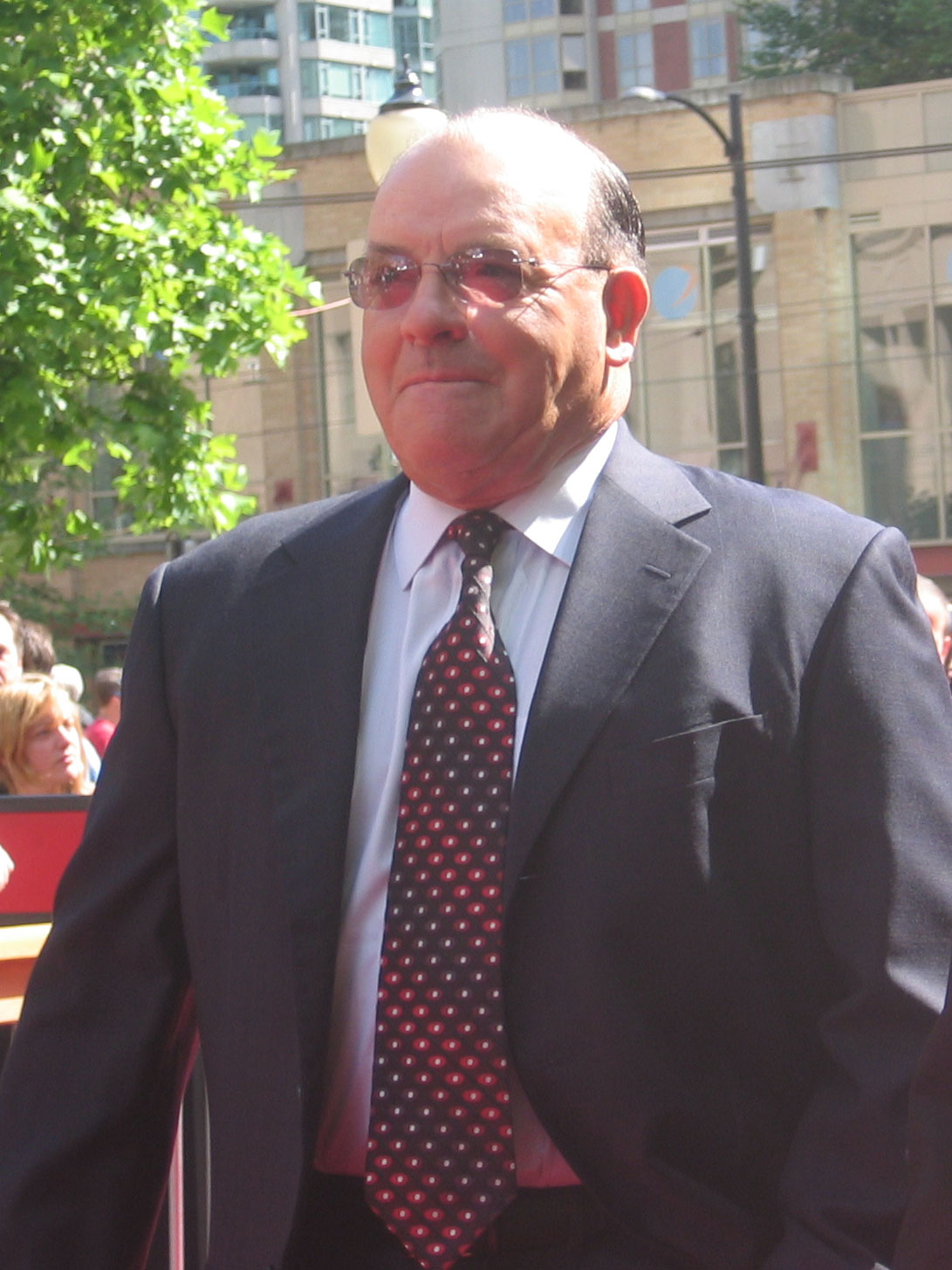
Hall of Famer Scotty Bowman won five Stanley Cup championships while coaching the Canadiens.

Officially known as le Club de hockey Canadien, the Montreal Canadiens (French: Les Canadiens de Montréal) are a Canadian professional ice hockey team based in Montreal, Quebec. They play in the Atlantic Division of the Eastern Conference in the National Hockey League (NHL). In 1909, the Canadiens were founded as a charter member of the National Hockey Association (NHA). In 1917, the franchise joined the NHL, and is one of the Original Six teams. In their 100-year history, the Canadiens have won 24 Stanley Cup championships, and are the last Canadian team to have won the Stanley Cup, having done so in 1993. Having played in the Jubilee Arena (1909–1910,1918–1919), the Montreal Arena (1911–1918), the Mount Royal Arena (1919–1926), and the Montreal Forum (1926–1996), the Canadiens have played their home games at the Bell Centre, formerly known as the Molson Centre, since 1996. The Canadiens are owned by the Molson Family. The general manager position is filled by Kent Hughes while their coaches consist of Martin St. Louis as their head coach, Derek Lalonde as associate coach, Stephane Robidas as assistant coach, and Marco Marciano as the goaltender coach. The current captain of the Canadiens is Nick Suzuki.

There have been 28 head coaches for the Canadiens franchise in the NHL. The team's first head coach in the NHL was Newsy Lalonde, who coached the Canadiens for eight NHL seasons in two stints. Although Dick Irvin coached the team for 15 seasons, Toe Blake, who coached two fewer seasons, is the franchise's all-time leader for the most regular-season games coached (914), the most regular-season games won (500), the most regular-season points (1159), the most playoff games coached (119), and the most playoff games won (82). Blake has also won the most Stanley Cup championships with eight; Scotty Bowman has won five, Irvin has won three, Cecil Hart has won two, and Leo Dandurand, Claude Ruel, Al MacNeil, Jean Perron, and Jacques Demers have won one each. Lalonde won a Stanley Cup championship in 1915–16 while in the NHA. Bowman and Pat Burns have each been awarded the Jack Adams Award, in 1976–77 and 1988–89 respectively. Nine head coaches have spent their entire NHL head coaching careers with the Canadiens. Bowman and Dandurand have been elected to the Hockey Hall of Fame as builders. Dandurand is the only coach to have spent his entire NHL head coaching career with the Canadiens and to have been elected to the Hockey Hall of Fame as a builder.

== Key ==
#	Number of coaches^{[a]}
GC	Games coached
W	Wins = Two points
L	Losses = No points
T	Ties = One point
OT	Overtime/shootout losses = One point^{[b]}
PTS	Points
Win%	Winning percentage^{[c]}
*	Spent entire NHL head coaching career with the Canadiens
†	Elected to the Hockey Hall of Fame as a builder
‡	Spent entire NHL head coaching career with the Canadiens and have been elected to the Hockey Hall of Fame as a builder

== Coaches ==
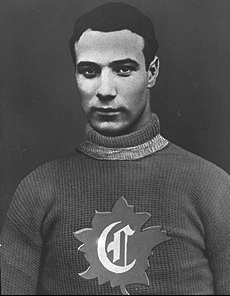
The Canadiens' first head coach in the NHL, Newsy Lalonde, coached the Canadiens for eight seasons in two stints.

Toe Blake won eight Stanley Cup championships in 13 years coaching the Canadiens.

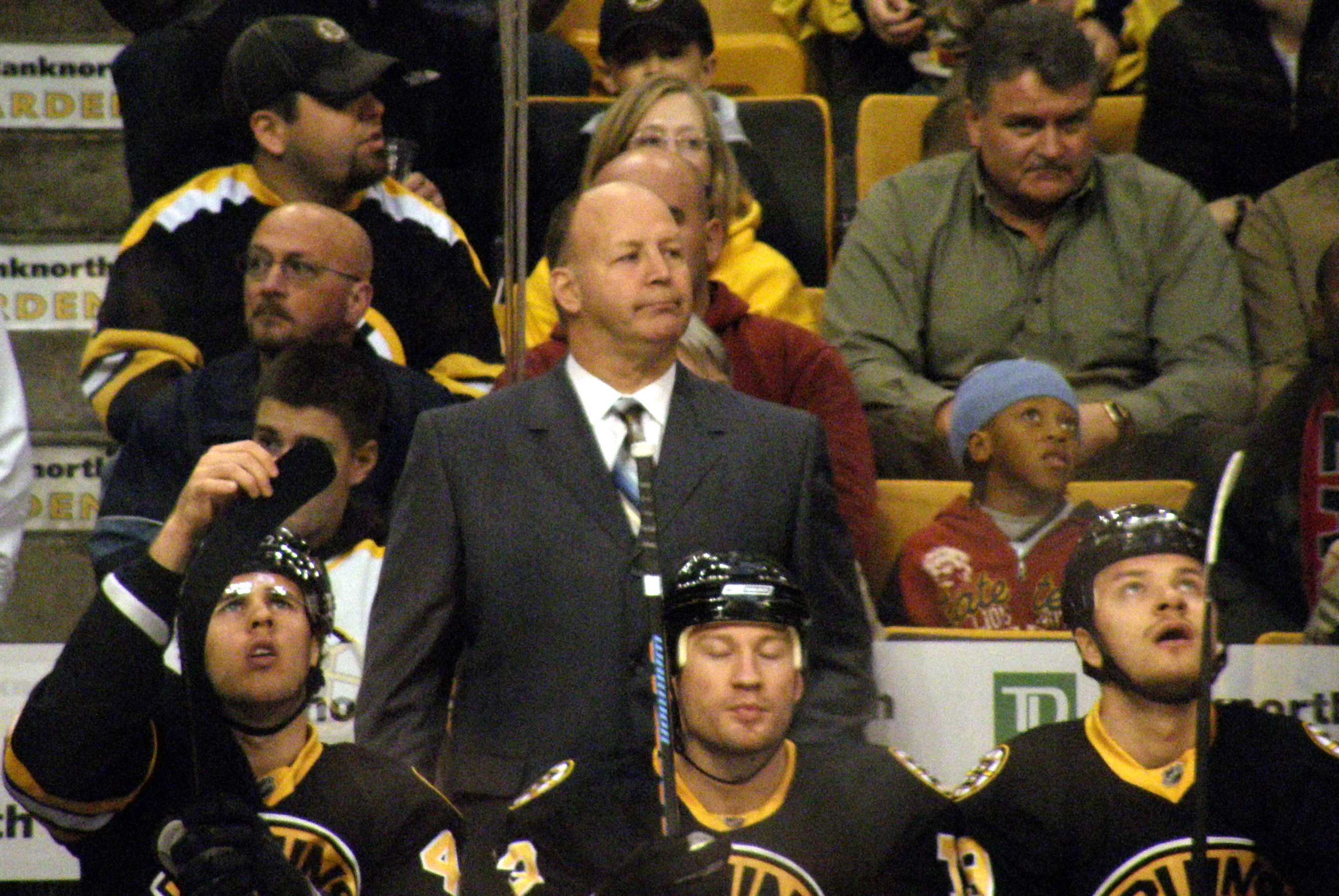
Claude Julien coached the Canadiens for three seasons from 2003 to 2006, before coming back from 2017 to 2021.

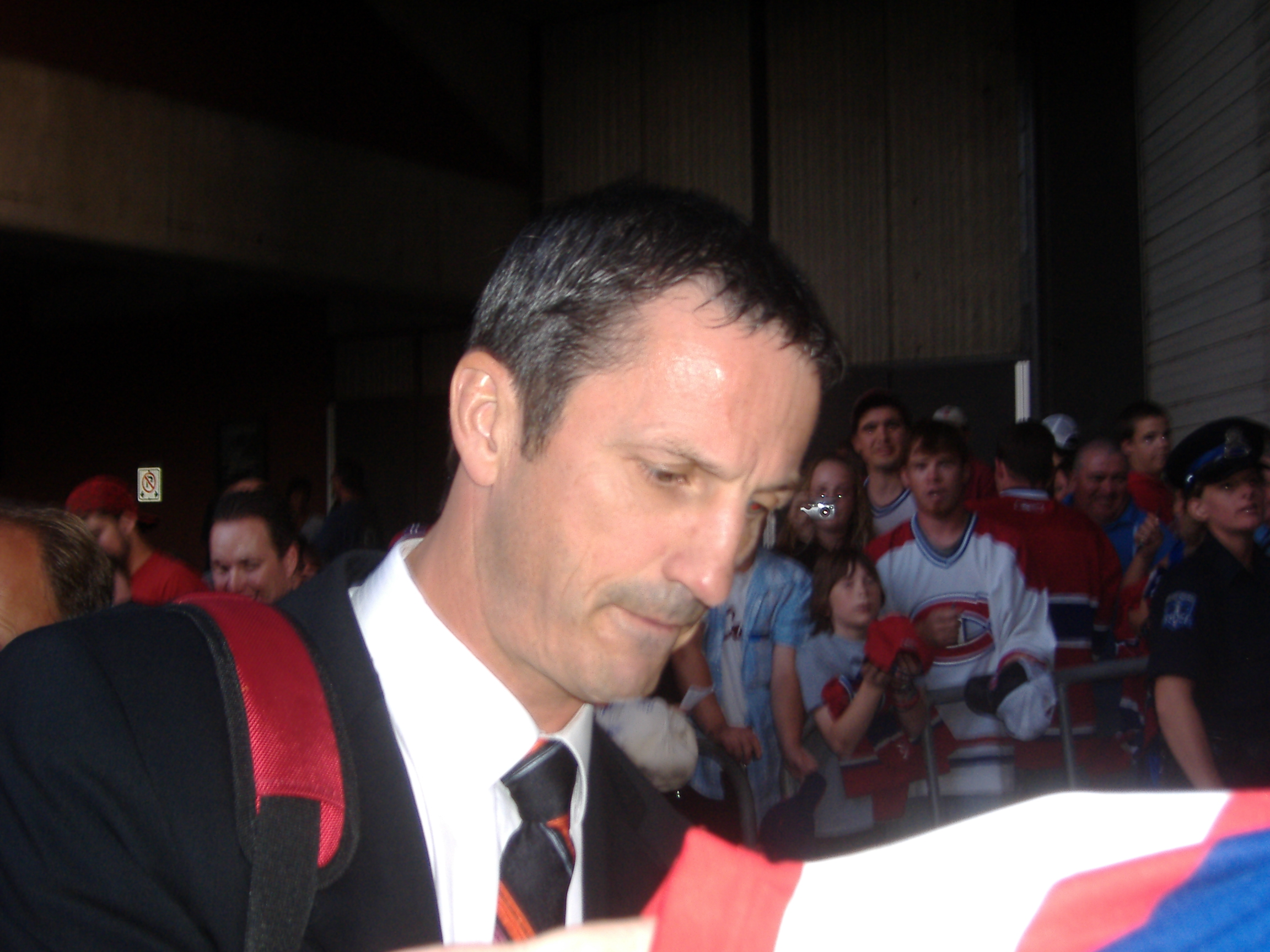
Guy Carbonneau was the head coach of the Canadiens from 2006 to 2009.

Note: Statistics are correct through the end of the 2023–24 season. This list only includes NHL coaches, and not NHA seasons.

#	Name	Term^{[d]}	Regular season						Playoffs					Achievements	Reference
#	Name	Term^{[d]}	GC	W	L	T/OT	PTS	Win%	GC	W	L	T	Win%	Achievements	Reference
1	Newsy Lalonde^{[e]}	1917–1922	95	51	44	—	102	.537	7	5	2	0	.714	1 O'Brien Trophy championship (1918–19)	
2	Leo Dandurand‡	1922–1926	131	64	63	6	134	.511	6	5	1	0	.833	1 Stanley Cup championship (1923–24); 2 Prince of Wales Trophy championships (1923–24, 1924–25)	
3	Cecil Hart*	1926–1932	268	148	72	48	344	.642	29	13	12	4	.517	2 Stanley Cup championships (1929–30, 1930–31)	
—	Newsy Lalonde	1932–1934	112	45	53	14	104	.464	4	0	2	2	.000		
—	Leo Dandurand‡	1934–1935	32	14	15	3	31	.484	2	0	2	0	.000		
4	Sylvio Mantha*^{[e]}	1935–1936	48	11	26	11	33	.344	—	—	—	—	—		
—	Cecil Hart*	1936–1939	126	48	53	25	121	.480	8	3	5	—	.375		
5	Jules Dugal*	1939	18	9	6	3	21	.583	3	1	2	—	.333		
6	Babe Siebert^{[e]}^{[f]}	1939–1940	—	—	—	—	—	—	—	—	—	—	—		
7	Alfred Lepine	1939–1940	48	10	33	5	25	.260	—	—	—	—	—		
8	Dick Irvin^{[e]}	1940–1955	896	431	313	152	1014	.566	115	62	53	—	.539	3 Stanley Cup championships (1943–44, 1945–46, 1952–53)	
9	Toe Blake*^{[e]}	1955–1968	914	500	255	159	1159	.634	119	82	37	—	.689	8 Stanley Cup championships (1955–56, 1956–57, 1957–58, 1958–59, 1959–60, 1964–65, 1965–66, 1967–68)	
10	Claude Ruel*	1968–1970	175	95	49	31	221	.631	14	12	2	—	.857	1 Stanley Cup championship (1968–69)	
11	Al MacNeil	1970–1971	55	31	15	9	71	.645	20	12	8	—	.600	1 Stanley Cup championship (1970–71)	
12	Scotty Bowman	1971–1979	634	419	110	105	943	.744	98	70	28	—	.714	5 Stanley Cup championships (1972–73, 1975–76, 1976–77, 1977–78, 1978–79); 1976–77 Jack Adams Award winner	
13	Bernie Geoffrion^{[e]}	1979	30	15	9	6	36	.600	—	—	—	—	—		
—	Claude Ruel*	1979–1981	130	77	33	20	174	.669	13	6	7	—	.462		
14	Bob Berry	1981–1984	223	116	71	36	268	.601	8	2	6	—	.250		
15	Jacques Lemaire^{[e]}	1984–1985	97	48	37	12	108	.557	27	15	12	—	.556		
16	Jean Perron	1985–1988	240	126	84	30	282	.588	48	30	18	—	.625	1 Stanley Cup championship (1985–86)	
17	Pat Burns†	1988–1992	320	174	104	42	390	.609	56	30	26	—	.536	1988–89 Jack Adams Award winner	
18	Jacques Demers	1992–1995	220	107	86	27	241	.548	27	19	8	—	.704	1 Stanley Cup championship (1992–93)	
—	Jacques Laperriere*^{[e]}	1995	1	0	1	0	0	.000	—	—	—	—	—		
19	Mario Tremblay*	1995–1997	159	71	63	25	167	.525	11	3	8	—	.273		
20	Alain Vigneault	1997–2000	266	109	118	39	257	.483	10	4	6	—	.400		
21	Michel Therrien	2000–2003	190	77	77	36	190	.500	12	6	6	—	.500		
22	Claude Julien	2003–2006	159	72	62	25	169	.531	11	4	7	—	.364		
—	Bob Gainey^{[e]}	2006	41	23	15	3	49	.598	6	2	4	—	.333		
23	Guy Carbonneau*	2006–2009	230	124	83	23	271	.589	12	5	7	—	.417		
—	Bob Gainey^{[e]}	2009	16	6	6	4	16	.500	4	0	4	—	.000		
24	Jacques Martin	2009–2011	196	96	75	25	217	.554	26	12	14	—	.462		
25	Randy Cunneyworth*	2011–2012	50	18	23	9	45	.450	—	—	—	—	—		
—	Michel Therrien	2012–2017	352	194	121	37	425	.612	34	17	17	—	.500	2017 NHL All Star Game - Atlantic Division Coach	
—	Claude Julien	2017–2021	277	129	113	35	293	.529	16	7	9	—	.416		
26	Dominique Ducharme*	2021–2022	83	23	46	14	60	.277	19	13	6	—	.684	2021 Stanley Cup finalist	
27	Martin St. Louis*^{[e]}	2022–present	201	75	100	26	176	.438	—	—	—	—	—		

== Notes ==
- ^{a} A running total of the number of coaches of the Canadiens. Thus, any coach who has two or more separate terms as head coach is only counted once.
- ^{b} Before the 2005–06 season, the NHL instituted a penalty shootout for regular season games that remained tied after a five-minute overtime period, which prevented ties.
- ^{c} In ice hockey, the winning percentage is calculated by dividing points by maximum possible points.
- ^{d} Each year is linked to an article about that particular NHL season.
- ^{e 1} ^{2} ^{3} ^{4} ^{5} ^{6} ^{7} ^{8} ^{9} ^{10} Newsy Lalonde, Babe Siebert, Sylvio Mantha, Dick Irvin, Toe Blake, Bernie Geoffrion, Jacques Lemaire, Jacques Laperriere, Bob Gainey, and Martin St. Louis have been inducted into the Hockey Hall of Fame as players.
- ^{f} Babe Siebert was named the head coach for the 1939–40 season, but died from drowning during the off-season.
