= Lists of NHL players =

This list of National Hockey League (NHL) players is divided into the following lists:

== By name ==
A • B • C • D • E • F • G • H • I • J • K • L • M • N • O • P • Q • R • S • T • U • V • W • X • Y • Z

== By team ==
=== Current ===
- List of Anaheim Ducks players
- List of Boston Bruins players
- List of Buffalo Sabres players
- List of Calgary Flames players
- List of Carolina Hurricanes players
- List of Chicago Blackhawks players
- List of Colorado Avalanche players
- List of Columbus Blue Jackets players
- List of Dallas Stars players
- List of Detroit Red Wings players
- List of Edmonton Oilers players
- List of Florida Panthers players
- List of Los Angeles Kings players
- List of Minnesota Wild players
- List of Montreal Canadiens players
- List of Nashville Predators players
- List of New Jersey Devils players
- List of New York Islanders players
- List of New York Rangers players
- List of Ottawa Senators players
- List of Philadelphia Flyers players
- List of Pittsburgh Penguins players
- List of San Jose Sharks players
- List of Seattle Kraken players
- List of St. Louis Blues players
- List of Tampa Bay Lightning players
- List of Toronto Maple Leafs players
- List of Utah Mammoth players
- List of Vancouver Canucks players
- List of Vegas Golden Knights players
- List of Washington Capitals players
- List of Winnipeg Jets players

=== Defunct ===
- List of Arizona Coyotes players
- List of Atlanta Flames players
- List of Atlanta Thrashers players
- List of Cleveland Barons players
- List of Colorado Rockies players
- List of Hamilton Tigers players
- List of Hartford Whalers players
- List of Kansas City Scouts players
- List of Minnesota North Stars players
- List of Montreal Maroons players
- List of Montreal Wanderers players
- List of New York Americans players
- List of Ottawa Senators (original) players
- List of Oakland Seals players
- List of Philadelphia Quakers players
- List of Pittsburgh Pirates players
- List of Quebec Nordiques players
- List of St. Louis Eagles players
- List of Winnipeg Jets (1979–96) players

== By a statistic ==
- List of NHL statistical leaders
- List of NHL career assists leaders
- List of goalscoring NHL goaltenders
- List of players with five or more goals in an NHL game
- List of players with eight or more points in an NHL game
- List of NHL players with 50-goal seasons
- List of NHL players with 100-point seasons
- List of NHL goaltenders with 300 wins
- List of NHL players with 500 consecutive games played
- List of NHL players with 500 goals
- List of NHL players with 1,000 games played
- List of NHL players with 1,000 points
- List of NHL players with 2,000 career penalty minutes

== By specific group ==
- List of first overall NHL draft picks
- List of undrafted NHL players with 100 games played
- List of NHL players who spent their entire career with one franchise
- List of players who played only one game in the NHL
- List of oldest National Hockey League players
- List of NHL players who have signed offer sheets
- List of current NHL emergency back-up goaltenders

== By demographics ==
- List of black NHL players
- List of Latvians in the NHL
- List of Slovaks in the NHL
- List of National Hockey League players born in the United Kingdom
- List of NHL statistical leaders by country

== See also ==
- List of current NHL Eastern Conference team rosters
- List of current NHL Western Conference team rosters
- List of current NHL captains and alternate captains
- List of WHA players
