= List of NHL players (E) =

This is a list of National Hockey League (NHL) players who have played at least one game in the NHL from 1917 to present and have a last name that starts with "E".

List updated as of the 2018–19 NHL season.

== Ea–Ek ==
- Ben Eager
- Mike Eagles
- Bruce Eakin
- Cody Eakin
- Dallas Eakins
- Robbie Earl
- Mike Eastwood
- Mark Eaton
- Jeff Eatough
- Mike Eaves
- Murray Eaves
- Patrick Eaves
- Andrew Ebbett
- Jordan Eberle
- Tim Ecclestone
- Tyler Eckford
- Rolf Edberg
- Frank Eddolls
- Darryl Edestrand
- Alexander Edler
- Garry "Duke" Edmundson
- Joel Edmundson
- Adam Edstrom
- Tom Edur
- Simon Edvinsson
- Don Edwards
- Gary Edwards
- Marv Edwards
- Roy Edwards
- Pat Egan
- Allan Egeland
- Jack Egers
- Nikolaj Ehlers
- Gerry Ehman
- Christoffer Ehn
- Christian Ehrhoff
- Jack Eichel
- Neil Eisenhut
- Victor Ejdsell
- Aaron Ekblad
- Mattias Ekholm
- Brian Eklund
- Pelle Eklund
- William Eklund
- Nils Ekman
- Oliver Ekman-Larsson

== El–En ==
- Anders Eldebrink
- Patrik Elias
- Matt Elich
- Remi Elie
- Boris Elik
- Todd Elik
- Darren Eliot
- Corey Elkins
- Ken Ellacott
- Lars Eller
- Keaton Ellerby
- David Ellett
- Brian Elliott
- Fred Elliott
- Stefan Elliott
- Dan Ellis
- Matt Ellis
- Morgan Ellis
- Ron Ellis
- Ryan Ellis
- Matt Ellison
- Miika Elomo
- Kari Eloranta
- Mikko Eloranta
- Turner Elson
- Pat Elynuik
- Eddie Emberg
- Ty Emberson
- Alexei Emelin
- Nelson Emerson
- Ray Emery
- Steve Eminger
- David Emma
- Cory Emmerton
- Gary Emmons
- John Emmons
- Leighton "Happy" Emms
- Craig Endean
- Shane Endicott
- Brian Engblom
- Jerry Engele
- Deryk Engelland
- John English
- Andreas Englund
- Pierre Engvall
- Jim Ennis
- Tyler Ennis
- Jhonas Enroth
- Tobias Enstrom
- MacKenzie Entwistle

== Er–Ez ==
- Martin Erat
- Aut Erickson
- Bryan Erickson
- Chad Erickson
- Grant Erickson
- Jonathan Ericsson
- Anders Eriksson
- Joacim Eriksson
- Loui Eriksson
- Peter Eriksson
- Roland Eriksson
- Thomas Eriksson
- Joel Eriksson Ek
- Olle Eriksson Ek
- Jan Erixon
- Tim Erixon
- Adam Erne
- Bob Errey
- Erik Ersberg
- John Erskine
- Samuel Ersson
- Len Esau
- Robert Esche
- Phil Esposito
- Tony Esposito
- Bob Essensa
- Emerson Etem
- Luke Evangelista
- Brennan Evans
- Chris Evans
- Claude Evans
- Daryl Evans
- Doug Evans
- Jack Evans
- Jake Evans
- Kevin Evans
- Paul Evans (born 1955)
- Paul Evans (born 1954)
- Ryker Evans
- Shawn Evans
- Stewart Evans
- Dean Evason
- Todd Ewen
- Garnet Exelby
- Randy Exelby
- Michael Eyssimont
- Bill Ezinicki

== See also ==
- hockeydb.com NHL Player List - E
