= List of Utah Mammoth players =

The Utah Mammoth are a professional ice hockey team based in Salt Lake City. The team competes in the National Hockey League (NHL) as a member of the Central Division in the Western Conference, and began play as an expansion team during the league's 2024–25 season. The team plays its home games at the Delta Center, an arena they share with the Utah Jazz of the National Basketball Association (NBA).

As of the end of the 2025–26 season, 35 skaters (forwards and defensemen) and 5 goaltenders have appeared in at least one game for the Mammoth.

== Key ==
* Appeared in a Utah Mammoth game during the 2025–26 season.
† Elected to the Hockey Hall of Fame, retired number, or Stanley Cup champion with the Utah Mammoth.

Abbreviations
Nat	Nationality
GP	Games played
SC	Stanley Cup champion
Ret	Jersey number retired by team
HHOF	Elected to the Hockey Hall of Fame

Nationality (Note: The nationality column lists the player's national team, or country of birth if the player has never competed internationally. The player's national team is listed if it differs from their country of birth.)
(Belarus)	Belarus
(Canada)	Canada
(Czech Republic)	Czech Republic
(Finland)	Finland
(Germany)	Germany
(Russia)	Russia
(Sweden)	Sweden
(United States)	United States

Goaltenders
W	Wins	SO	Shutouts
L	Losses	GAA	Goals against average
OTL	Overtime losses	SV%	Save percentage

Skaters
Pos	Position	C	Centre	A	Assists
D	Defenseman	F	Forward	P	Points
LW	Left wing	G	Goals	PIM	Penalty minutes
RW	Right wing				

Statistics are complete to the end of the 2025–26 NHL season.

== Goaltenders ==
Goaltenders who have played for the franchise (Note: Hockey-Reference.com considers ties in the same category as overtime losses. As the Utah Mammoth were founded after the NHL abolished ties, they are not included on this table.)
Name	Nat.	Years	GP	W	L	OTL	SO	GAA	SV%	GP	W	L	SO	GAA	SV%	Notes
Name	Nat.	Years	Regular season							Playoffs						Notes
Connor Ingram	(Canada)	2024–2025	22	9	8	4	0	3.27	.882	—	—	—	—	—	—	
Jaxson Stauber	(United States)	2024–present	6	2	1	1	1	3.26	.892	—	—	—	—	—	—	
Vítek Vaněček*	(Czech Republic)	2025–2026	22	5	13	3	1	2.93	.883	—	—	—	—	—	—	
Karel Vejmelka*	(Czech Republic)	2024–present	122	64	42	11	3	2.67	.900	6	2	4	0	3.13	.885	
Matt Villalta	(Canada)	2024–2026	1	1	0	0	0	3.00	.903	—	—	—	—	—	—	

== Skaters ==
Skaters who have played for the franchise
Name	Nat.	Pos.	Years	GP	G	A	P	PIM	GP	G	A	P	PIM	Notes
Name	Nat.	Pos.	Years	Regular season					Playoffs					Notes
Andrew Agozzino*	(Canada)	LW	2024–2026	2	0	0	0	0	—	—	—	—	—	
Nick Bjugstad	(United States)	C	2024–2025	66	8	11	19	16	—	—	—	—	—	
Robert Bortuzzo	(Canada)	D	2024–2025	17	0	2	2	22	—	—	—	—	—	
Daniil But*	(Russia)	LW	2025–present	29	3	4	7	8	—	—	—	—	—	
Michael Carcone*	(Canada)	LW	2024–present	132	23	27	50	58	6	2	0	2	2	
Ian Cole*	(United States)	D	2024–2026	164	4	36	40	127	6	1	1	2	4	
Logan Cooley*	(United States)	C	2024–present	129	49	59	108	74	6	2	1	3	10	
Lawson Crouse*	(Canada)	LW	2024–present	162	36	26	62	85	6	3	2	5	2	
Nick DeSimone*	(United States)	D	2025–present	60	3	11	14	10	—	—	—	—	—	
Josh Doan	(United States)	RW	2024–2025	51	7	12	19	8	—	—	—	—	—	
Sean Durzi*	(Canada)	D	2024–2026	90	9	29	38	69	6	0	2	2	4	
Dylan Guenther*	(Canada)	RW	2024–present	479	67	66	133	54	6	3	2	5	2	
Barrett Hayton*	(Canada)	C	2024–present	149	30	41	71	99	1	0	0	0	0	
Clayton Keller*	(United States)	RW	2024–present	163	56	122	178	66	6	1	4	5	0	
Alexander Kerfoot*	(Canada)	C	2024–2026	115	18	23	41	37	6	0	1	1	6	
Michael Kesselring	(United States)	D	2024–2025	82	7	22	29	89	—	—	—	—	—	
Vladislav Kolyachonok	(Belarus)	D	2024–2025	23	2	3	5	2	—	—	—	—	—	
Maveric Lamoureux*	(Canada)	D	2024–present	20	1	3	4	44	—	—	—	—	—	
Olli Määttä*	(Finland)	D	2024–2026	92	2	17	19	18	—	—	—	—	—	
Matias Maccelli	(Finland)	LW	2024–2025	55	8	10	18	8	—	—	—	—	—	
John Marino*	(United States)	D	2024–present	115	5	45	50	18	6	1	0	1	0	
Jack McBain*	(Canada)	C	2024–present	157	22	30	52	162	2	0	0	0	0	
Dakota Mermis	(United States)	D	2024–2025	1	0	0	0	2	—	—	—	—	—	
Liam O'Brien*	(Canada)	C	2024–present	66	3	3	6	93	3	0	1	1	2	
JJ Peterka*	(Germany)	RW	2025–2026	82	25	22	47	28	6	0	0	0	2	
Kevin Rooney*	(United States)	C	2025–2026	1	1	0	1	0	—	—	—	—	—	
Nick Schmaltz*	(United States)	C	2024–present	164	53	84	137	42	6	1	3	4	2	
Nate Schmidt*	(United States)	D	2025–present	82	5	17	22	22	6	0	1	1	2	
Mikhail Sergachev*	(Russia)	D	2024–present	155	25	87	112	76	6	0	5	5	4	
Dmitriy Simashev*	(Russia)	D	2024–present	28	0	1	1	23	—	—	—	—	—	
Kevin Stenlund*	(Sweden)	C	2024–present	162	18	28	46	64	6	1	0	1	2	
Brandon Tanev*	(Canada)	LW	2025–present	56	0	3	3	50	6	0	0	0	4	
Juuso Välimäki	(Finland)	D	2024–2026	43	2	3	5	14	—	—	—	—	—	
MacKenzie Weegar*	(Canada)	D	2026–present	19	1	6	7	19	6	2	3	5	2	
Kailer Yamamoto*	(United States)	RW	2024–present	71	15	11	26	16	6	1	4	5	2	
