= List of NHL players (Q) =

This is a list of National Hockey League (NHL) players who have played at least one game in the NHL from 1917 to present and have a last name that starts with "Q".

List updated as of the 2018–19 NHL season.

== Q ==
- Bill Quackenbush
- Max Quackenbush
- Joel Quenneville
- John Quenneville
- Leo Quenneville
- Jonathan Quick
- Kevin Quick
- John Quilty
- Kyle Quincey
- Alan Quine
- Dan Quinn
- Jack Quinn
- Pat Quinn
- Gage Quinney
- Ken Quinney
- Deron Quint
- Stephane Quintal
- J. F. Quintin

== See also ==
- hockeydb.com NHL Player List - Q
