= List of NHL players (U–V) =

This is a list of National Hockey League (NHL) players who have played at least one game in the NHL from 1917 to present and have a last name that starts with either "U" or "V".

List updated as of the 2018–19 NHL season.

== U ==
- Gene Ubriaco
- Dominik Uher
- Igor Ulanov
- Norm Ullman
- Linus Ullmark
- Jeff Ulmer
- Layne Ulmer
- David Ullstrom
- R. J. Umberger
- Matt Underhill
- Garry Unger
- Scottie Upshall
- Alexander Urbom
- Stefan Ustorf

== Va ==
- Urho Vaakanainen
- Ossi Vaananen
- Nicholas Vachon
- Rogatien Vachon
- Carol Vadnais
- Lubomir Vaic
- Eric Vail
- Melville "Sparky" Vail
- Rick Vaive
- Boris Valabik
- Chris Valentine
- Rob Valicevic
- Rinat Valiev
- Juuso Valimaki
- Jack Valiquette
- Steve Valiquette
- Curtis Valk
- Garry Valk
- Lindsay Vallis
- Shaun Van Allen
- John Van Boxmeer
- Bryce Van Brabant
- David Van der Gulik
- Wayne Van Dorp
- David Van Drunen
- Darren Van Impe
- Ed Van Impe
- James van Riemsdyk
- Trevor van Riemsdyk
- Mike Van Ryn
- John Vanbiesbrouck
- Ryan VandenBussche
- Jim Vandermeer
- Pete Vandermeer
- Chris VandeVelde
- Vitek Vanecek
- Thomas Vanek
- Vaclav Varada
- Petri Varis
- Semyon Varlamov
- Sergei Varlamov
- Phil Varone
- Jarkko Varvio
- Josef Vasicek
- Alex Vasilevsky
- Andrei Vasilevskiy
- Alexei Vasiliev
- Herbert Vasiljevs
- Andrei Vasilyev
- Dennis Vaske
- Elmer Vasko
- Rick Vasko
- Sami Vatanen
- Frank Vatrano
- Julien Vauclair
- Yvon Vautour
- Greg Vaydik

== Ve–Vi ==
- Mike Vecchione
- Veini Vehvilainen
- Stephane Veilleux
- Mike Veisor
- Darren Veitch
- Lukas Vejdemo
- Karel Vejmelka
- Joe Veleno
- Randy Velischek
- Mike Vellucci
- Vic Venasky
- Gary Veneruzzo
- Pat Verbeek
- Carter Verhaeghe
- Antoine Vermette
- Mark Vermette
- Joel Vermin
- Mike Vernace
- Kris Vernarsky
- Mike Vernon
- Max Veronneau
- Darcy Verot
- Claude Verret
- Kris Versteeg
- Leigh Verstraete
- Dennis Ververgaert
- Kristian Vesalainen
- Ryan Vesce
- Jim Vesey (born 1965)
- Jimmy Vesey (born 1993)
- Linden Vey
- Sidney Veysey
- Georges Vezina
- Dennis Vial
- Steve Vickers
- Jeffrey Viel
- J. P. Vigier
- Alain Vigneault
- Vesa Viitakoski
- Gabriel Vilardi
- Claude Vilgrain
- Matt Villalta
- Gilles Villemure
- Dan Vincelette
- Tomas Vincour
- Pete Vipond
- Hannu Virta
- Tony Virta
- Jake Virtanen
- Terry Virtue
- Mark Visheau
- Ivan Vishnevskiy
- Vitaly Vishnevskiy
- Lubomir Visnovsky
- Joe Vitale
- Harijs Vitolinsh
- Emanuel Viveiros

== Vl–Vy ==
- Daniel Vladar
- Tomas Vlasak
- Alex Vlasic
- Marc-Edouard Vlasic
- Ed Vokes
- Tomas Vokoun
- Mickey Volcan
- Anton Volchenkov
- Alexandre Volchkov
- David Volek
- Alexander Volkov
- Doug Volmar
- Aaron Volpatti
- Reto Von Arx
- Phil Von Stefenelli
- Jan Vopat
- Roman Vopat
- Jakub Voracek
- Pavel Vorobiev
- Vladimir Vorobiev
- Mikhail Vorobyev
- Dmitri Voronkov
- Aaron Voros
- Carl Voss
- Slava Voynov
- Jakub Vrana
- Petr Vrana
- Radim Vrbata
- Vladimir Vujtek
- Mick Vukota
- Igor Vyazmikin
- David Vyborny
- Sergei Vyshedkevich

== See also ==
- hockeydb.com NHL Player List - U
- hockeydb.com NHL Player List - V
