= List of NHL players (I) =

This is a list of National Hockey League (NHL) players who have played at least one game in the NHL from 1917 to present and have a last name that starts with "I".

List updated as of the 2018–19 NHL season.

== I ==
- Alex Iafallo
- Al Iafrate
- Mike Iggulden
- Jarome Iginla
- Viktors Ignatjevs
- Miroslav Ihnacak
- Peter Ihnacak
- Bokondji Imama
- Brent Imlach
- Jarkko Immonen
- Peter Ing
- Earl Ingarfield, Sr.
- Earl Ingarfield, Jr.
- Bill Inglis
- Jack Ingoldsby
- Connor Ingram
- Frank Ingram
- Ron Ingram
- Gary Inness
- Ralph Intranuovo
- Vincent Iorio
- Arturs Irbe
- Randy Ireland
- Danny Irmen
- Robbie Irons
- Joe Ironstone
- Dick Irvin
- Ted Irvine
- Leland Irving
- Brayden Irwin
- Ivan Irwin
- Matt Irwin
- Ulf Isaksson
- Brad Isbister
- Ruslan Iskhakov
- Kim Issel
- Raitis Ivanans

== See also ==
- hockeydb.com NHL Player List - I
