= List of Seattle Kraken players =

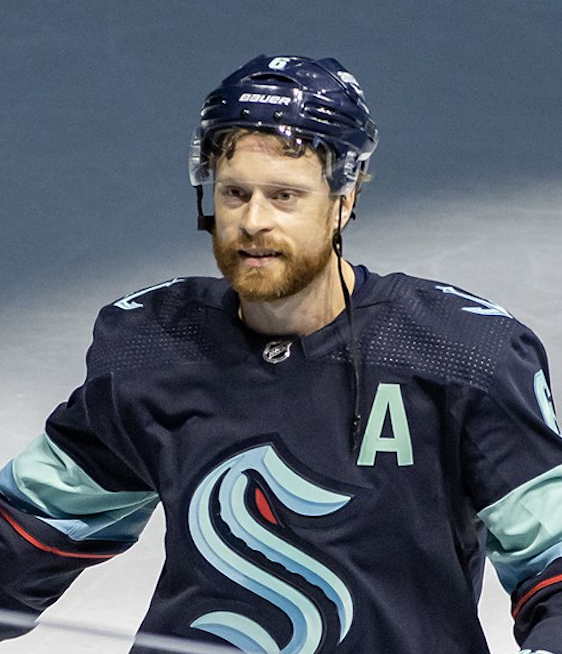
Kraken alternate captain Adam Larsson has played 409 games with the team, meaning he has played all games in the Kraken's five seasons but one.

The Seattle Kraken are a professional ice hockey team based in Seattle. They are members of the Pacific Division of the National Hockey League (NHL). Since their arrival in 2021, 65 players, 7 goaltenders and 58 skaters (forwards and defensemen) have played in a Kraken jersey for at least one regular season game.

Each NHL team may select a captain, who has the "privilege of discussing with the Referee any questions relating to interpretation of rules which may arise during the progress of a game." Captains are required to wear the letter "C" on their uniform for identification, the "C" being approximately 3 inches (7.6 cm) in height. The first player to have served as captain of the Kraken is Mark Giordano, his captaincy starting in October 2021 and ending five months later. On October 8, 2024, prior to the Kraken's first game of the 2024–25 season, Jordan Eberle was named the team's new captain.

Adam Larsson has the most games played out of any Kraken, with 245. Jared McCann leads the Kraken in both goals and points, with 96 and 182, respectively. Vince Dunn leads the Kraken in assists, with 113.

== Key ==
- * Appeared in a Kraken game during the 2024–25 season.

Abbreviations
GP	Games played
Nat.	Nationality

Nationality
(Canada)	Canada
(Czech Republic)	Czech Republic
(Denmark)	Denmark
(Finland)	Finland
(France)	France
(Haudenosaunee)	Iroquois
(Germany)	Germany
(Netherlands)	Netherlands
(Slovakia)	Slovakia
(Sweden)	Sweden
(United States)	United States

Goaltenders
W	Wins
L	Losses
OTL	Overtime losses
SO	Shutouts
GAA	Goals against average
SV%	Save percentage

Skaters
Pos.	Position	RW	Right wing	A	Assists
D	Defenseman	C	Center	P	Points
LW	Left wing	G	Goals	PIM	Penalty minutes

Statistics reflect time with the Kraken only. Statistics complete as of the end of the 2023–24 season.

== Goaltenders ==
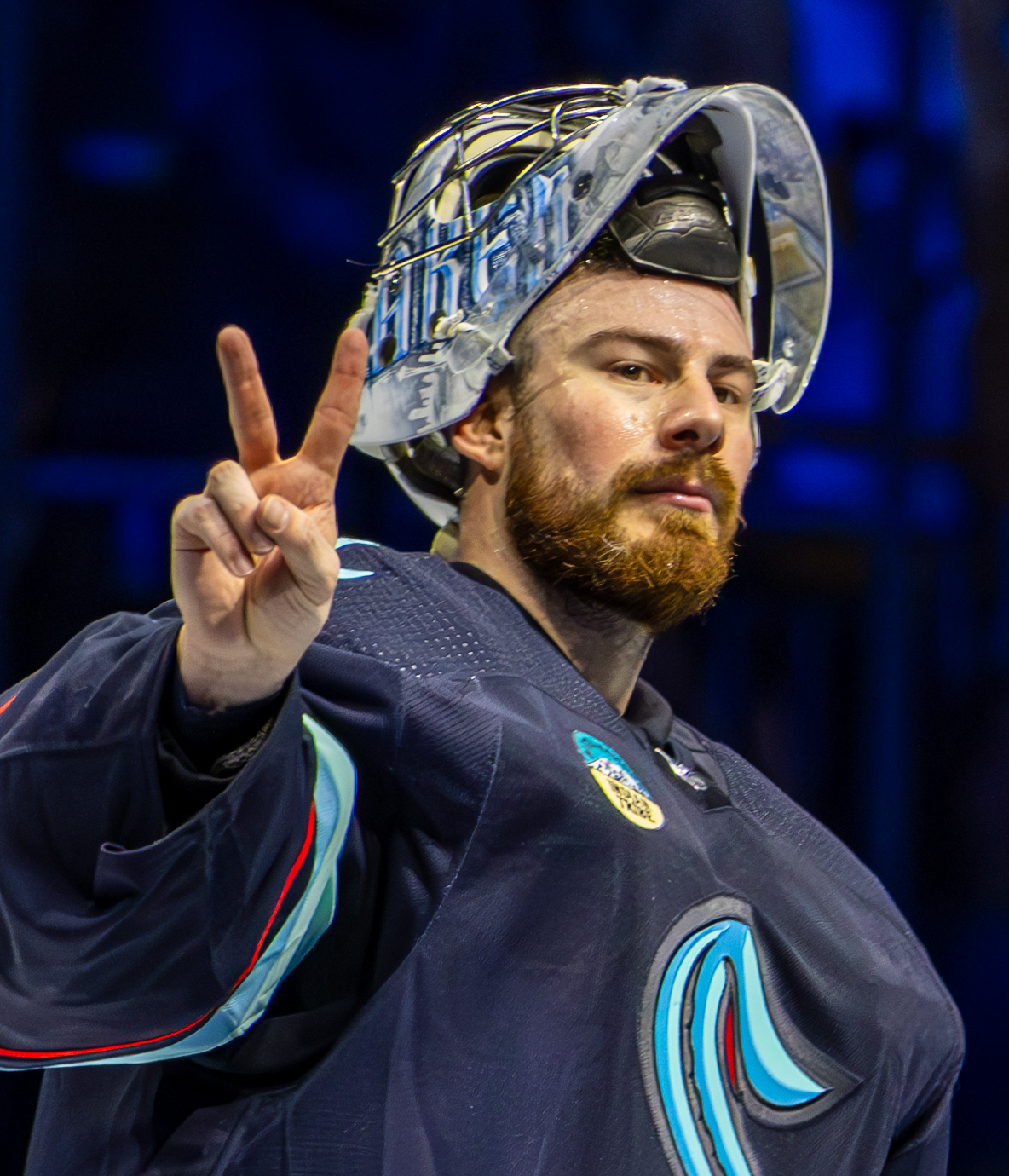
Philipp Grubauer has the most wins of any Kraken goaltender, with 49.

List of Seattle Kraken goaltenders
Name	Nat.	Years	GP	W	L	OTL	SO	GAA	SV%	GP	W	L	SO	GAA	SV%	Notes
Name	Nat.	Years	Regular season							Playoffs						Notes
Joey Daccord*	(United States)	2021–2026	164	68	66	23	7	2.80	.904	—	—	—	—	—	—	
Chris Driedger	(Canada)	2021–2024	29	10	15	1	1	2.93	.900	—	—	—	—	—	—	
Philipp Grubauer*	(Germany)	2021–2026	188	70	90	16	4	3.00	.894	14	7	7	0	2.99	.903	
Martin Jones	(Canada)	2022–2023	48	27	13	3	3	2.99	.886	1	0	0	0	0.00	1.000	
Nikke Kokko*	(Finland)	2024–2026	4	1	2	0	0	3.18	.875	—	—	—	—	—	—	
Matt Murray*	(Canada)	2025–2026	5	0	2	1	0	2.21	.922	—	—	—	—	—	—	
Victor Ostman*	(Sweden)	2024–2026	2	0	1	0	0	1.56	.957	—	—	—	—	—	—	
Aleš Stezka	(Czech Republic)	2024–2025	1	0	1	0	0	3.09	.864	—	—	—	—	—	—	

== Skaters ==
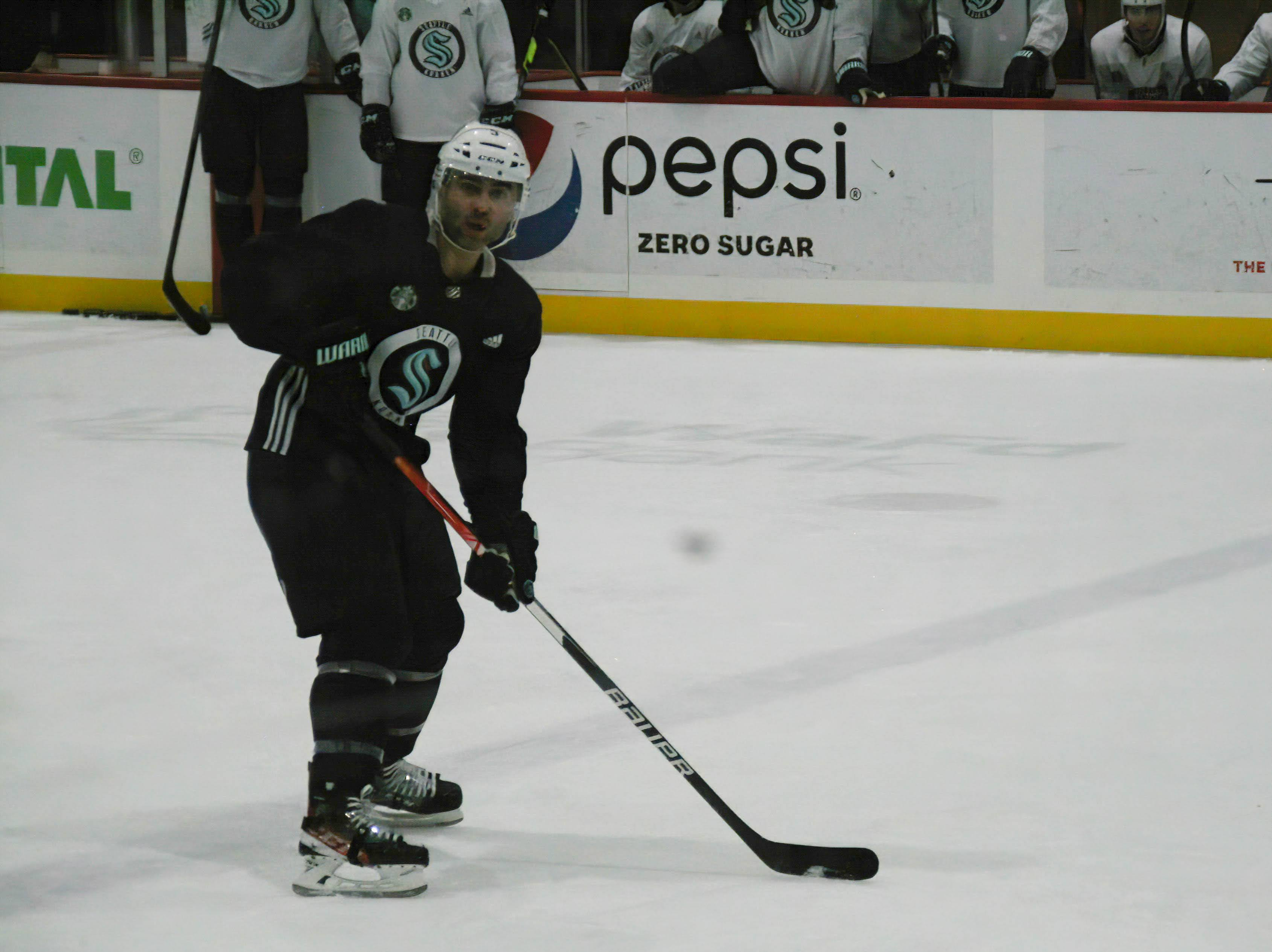
Mark Giordano was the Seattle Kraken's inaugural captain from 2021 to 2022.

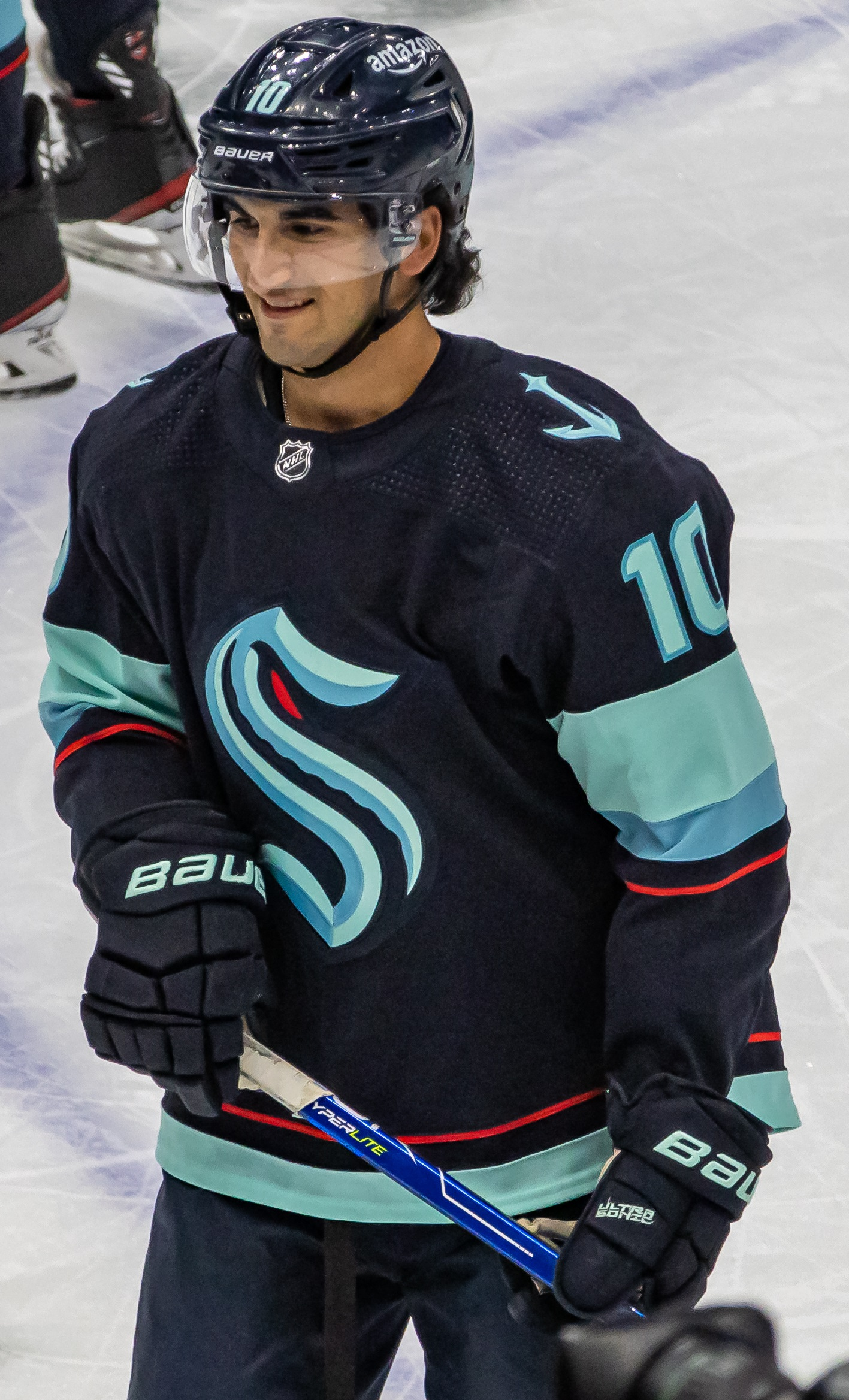
Matty Beniers was the first-ever draft selection for the Kraken. During the 2022–23 season, he won the Calder Memorial Trophy as NHL rookie of the year.

List of Seattle Kraken skaters
Name	Nat.	Pos.	Years	GP	G	A	P	PIM	GP	G	A	P	PIM	Notes
Name	Nat.	Pos.	Years	Regular season					Playoffs					Notes
Mason Appleton	(United States)	C	2021–2022	49	6	11	17	14	—	—	—	—	—	
Alex Barre-Boulet	(Canada)	C	2021–2022	2	0	1	1	0	—	—	—	—	—	
Nathan Bastian	(Canada)	RW	2021–2022	12	1	1	2	31	—	—	—	—	—	
Pierre-Edouard Bellemare	(France)	LW	2023–2024	40	4	3	7	6	—	—	—	—	—	
Matty Beniers*	(United States)	C	2021–2026	331	82	114	196	59	14	3	4	7	4	Calder Memorial Trophy (2023)
Oliver Bjorkstrand	(Denmark)	RW	2022–2025	224	56	85	141	42	14	4	4	8	0	
Colin Blackwell	(United States)	C	2021–2022	39	8	9	17	4	—	—	—	—	—	
Will Borgen	(United States)	D	2021–2025	233	9	46	55	149	14	1	2	3	8	
Andre Burakovsky^{[b]}	(Sweden)	LW	2022–2025	177	30	62	92	40	—	—	—	—	—	
Berkly Catton*	(Canada)	F	2025–2026	66	7	10	17	31	—	—	—	—	—	
Dennis Cholowski	(Canada)	D	2021–2022	4	0	2	2	0	—	—	—	—	—	
Austin Czarnik	(United States)	C	2021–2022	6	0	2	2	0	—	—	—	—	—	
Ryan Donato	(United States)	C	2021–2023	145	30	28	58	86	14	0	2	2	12	
Joonas Donskoi	(Finland)	RW	2021–2022	75	2	20	22	14	—	—	—	—	—	
Brian Dumoulin	(United States)	D	2023–2024	80	6	10	16	20	—	—	—	—	—	
Vince Dunn*	(Canada)	D	2021–2026	356	54	174	228	283	14	1	6	7	22	
Jordan Eberle*	(Canada)	RW	2021–2026	361	93	139	232	107	14	6	5	11	6	Captain (2024–present)
Ryker Evans*	(Canada)	D	2023–2026	176	14	37	51	90	—	—	—	—	—	
Michael Eyssimont	(United States)	C	2024–2025	20	4	2	6	19	—	—	—	—	—	
Oscar Fisker Molgaard*	(Denmark)	C	2025–2026	13	0	2	2	2	—	—	—	—	—	
Cale Fleury*	(Canada)	D	2021–2026	59	1	4	5	9	—	—	—	—	—	
Haydn Fleury	(Canada)	D	2021–2022	36	2	2	4	13	—	—	—	—	—	
Jesper Froden	(Sweden)	RW	2022–2023	14	0	4	4	6	1	0	0	0	0	
Frederick Gaudreau*	(Canada)	C	2025–2026	68	7	17	24	11	—	—	—	—	—	
Morgan Geekie	(Canada)	C	2021–2023	142	16	34	50	42	13	2	2	4	12	
Mark Giordano	(Canada)	D	2021–2022	55	6	17	23	47	—	—	—	—	—	Captain (2021–2022)
Yanni Gourde	(Canada)	C	2021–2025	271	52	94	146	219	14	4	9	13	14	
John Hayden*	(United States)	C	2022–2026	32	3	1	4	40	—	—	—	—	—	
Calle Jarnkrok	(Sweden)	C	2021–2022	49	12	14	26	2	—	—	—	—	—	
Marcus Johansson	(Sweden)	LW	2021–2022	51	6	17	23	4	—	—	—	—	—	
Kaapo Kakko*	(Finland)	RW	2024–2026	114	23	47	70	38	—	—	—	—	—	
Tye Kartye	(Canada)	LW	2022–2025	140	17	16	33	80	10	3	2	5	2	
Karson Kuhlman	(United States)	C	2021–2023	39	3	8	11	6	—	—	—	—	—	
Adam Larsson*	(Sweden)	D	2021–2026	409	34	95	129	230	14	2	2	4	8	
Jeremy Lauzon	(Canada)	D	2021–2022	53	1	5	6	67	—	—	—	—	—	
Kole Lind	(Canada)	RW	2021–2024	24	2	6	8	12	—	—	—	—	—	
Ryan Lindgren*	(United States)	D	2025–2026	76	2	7	9	60	—	—	—	—	—	
Josh Mahura*	(Canada)	D	2024–2026	87	1	11	12	36	—	—	—	—	—	
Mason Marchment*	(Canada)	F	2025–2026	29	4	9	13	26	—	—	—	—	—	
Jared McCann*	(Canada)	LW	2021–2026	367	138	145	283	107	8	1	2	3	6	
Max McCormick	(United States)	LW	2021–2024	11	0	0	0	10	—	—	—	—	—	
Bobby McMann*	(Canada)	F	2025–2026	18	10	4	14	2	—	—	—	—	—	
Jaycob Megna	(United States)	D	2022–2023	6	0	0	0	0	—	—	—	—	—	
Jacob Melanson*	(Canada)	RW	2024–2026	37	2	3	5	32	—	—	—	—	—	
Ben Meyers*	(United States)	F	2024–2026	60	7	8	15	18	—	—	—	—	—	
Brandon Montour*	(Canada)	D	2024–2026	145	29	44	73	115	—	—	—	—	—	
Logan Morrison	(Canada)	C	2023–2024	4	0	0	0	0	—	—	—	—	—	
Jani Nyman*	(Finland)	RW	2024–2026	40	7	6	13	10	—	—	—	—	—	
Jamie Oleksiak*	(Canada)	D	2021–2026	389	21	68	89	233	14	1	2	3	8	
Gustav Olofsson	(Sweden)	D	2022–2024	4	0	0	0	0	—	—	—	—	—	
Ville Ottavainen	(Finland)	D	2024–2025	1	0	1	1	0	—	—	—	—	—	
Andrew Poturalski	(United States)	C	2023–2024	2	0	0	0	0	—	—	—	—	—	
Derrick Pouliot	(Canada)	D	2021–2022	9	0	3	3	2	—	—	—	—	—	
Victor Rask	(Sweden)	C	2021–2022	18	4	4	8	0	—	—	—	—	—	
Justin Schultz	(Canada)	D	2022–2024	143	14	46	60	62	14	3	7	10	2	
Jaden Schwartz*	(Canada)	C	2021–2026	301	79	89	168	92	14	5	5	10	2	
Riley Sheahan	(Canada)	C	2021–2022	69	4	13	17	2	—	—	—	—	—	
Devin Shore	(Canada)	C	2023–2024	21	1	3	4	4	—	—	—	—	—	
Carson Soucy	(Canada)	D	2021–2023	142	13	24	37	115	14	1	1	2	12	
Daniel Sprong	(Netherlands)	RW	2021–2023; 2024–2025	92	28	26	54	14	10	1	1	2	0	
Mitchell Stephens	(Canada)	C	2024–2025	28	1	2	3	6	—	—	—	—	—	
Chandler Stephenson*	(Canada)	C	2024–2026	158	29	71	100	38	—	—	—	—	—	
Marian Studenic	(Slovakia)	RW	2023–2024	2	0	0	0	2	—	—	—	—	—	
Brandon Tanev	(Canada)	LW	2021–2025	238	41	42	83	118	14	1	3	4	4	
Tomas Tatar	(Slovakia)	LW	2023–2024	43	8	7	15	10	—	—	—	—	—	
Eeli Tolvanen*	(Finland)	RW	2022–2026	288	67	72	139	87	14	3	5	8	6	
Alexander True	(Denmark)	C	2021–2022	8	0	0	0	2	—	—	—	—	—	
Alexander Wennberg	(Sweden)	C	2021–2024	222	33	67	100	62	14	2	5	7	2	
Ryan Winterton*	(Canada)	C	2023–2026	89	4	15	19	17	—	—	—	—	—	
Shane Wright*	(Canada)	C	2022–2026	169	36	42	78	30	—	—	—	—	—	
Kailer Yamamoto	(United States)	RW	2023–2024	59	8	8	16	18	—	—	—	—	—	

== Notes ==
- ^{a} The "Seasons" column lists the first year of the season of the player's first game and the last year of the season of the player's last game. For example, a player who played one game in the 2021–22 season would be listed as playing with the team from 2021 to 2022, regardless of what calendar year the game occurred within.
- ^{b} While Burakovsky was born in Austria, his nationality is listed as Swedish because he played for the Swedish national team.
