= List of NHL players (A) =

This is a list of National Hockey League (NHL) players who have played at least one game in the NHL from 1917 to present and have a last name that starts with "A".

List updated as of the 2023–24 NHL season.

== Aa–Al ==
- Antti Aalto
- Wyatt Aamodt
- George Abbott
- Reg Abbott
- Spencer Abbott
- Nick Abruzzese
- Justin Abdelkader
- Clarence "Taffy" Abel
- Gerry Abel
- Sid Abel
- Pontus Aberg
- Dennis Abgrall
- Ramzi Abid
- Thommy Abrahamsson
- Vitalii Abramov
- Noel Acciari
- Gene Achtymichuk
- Doug Acomb
- Keith Acton
- Will Acton
- Doug Adam
- Luke Adam
- Russ Adam
- Bryan Adams
- Craig Adams
- Greg Adams (born 1960)
- Greg Adams (born 1963)
- Jack Adams (born 1895)
- Jack Adams (born 1920)
- John Adams
- Kevyn Adams
- Stewart Adams
- Calen Addison
- Rick Adduono
- David Aebischer
- Dmitri Afanasenkov
- Egor Afanasyev
- Bruce Affleck
- Maxim Afinogenov
- Jim Agnew
- Kenny Agostino
- Andrew Agozzino
- Jack Ahcan
- Fred Ahern
- Rudy Ahlin
- Sebastian Aho (born 1996)
- Sebastian Aho (born 1997)
- Peter Ahola
- Chris Ahrens
- John Aiken
- Lloyd Ailsby
- Brad Aitken
- Johnathan Aitken
- Andy Aitkenhead
- Sami Aittokallio
- Micah Aivazoff
- Jason Akeson
- Mika Alatalo
- Tommy Albelin
- John Albert
- Andrew Alberts
- Clint Albright
- Gary Aldcorn
- Keith Aldridge
- Claire Alexander
- Jett Alexander
- Art Alexandre
- Nikita Alexandrov
- Nikita Alexeev
- Alexander Alexeyev
- Daniel Alfredsson
- Akim Aliu
- Jeff Allan
- Frederic Allard
- Bobby Allen
- Bryan Allen
- Chris Allen
- Conor Allen
- George Allen
- Jake Allen
- Keith Allen
- Peter Allen
- Vivan "Squee" Allen
- Steve Alley
- Dave Allison
- Jamie Allison
- Jason Allison
- Mike Allison
- Ray Allison
- Wade Allison
- Bill Allum
- Ralph "Red" Almas
- Cody Almond
- Adam Almqvist
- Hugo Alnefelt
- Olle Alsing
- Mark Alt
- Jorge Alves
- Karl Alzner

== Am–Ap ==
- Dave Amadio
- Michael Amadio
- Nils Aman
- Peter Ambroziak
- Mike Amodeo
- Tony Amonte
- Frederik Andersen
- Bill "Red" Anderson
- Craig Anderson
- Dale Anderson
- Doug "Andy" Anderson
- Earl Anderson
- Glenn Anderson
- Jim Anderson
- Joey Anderson
- John Anderson
- Josh Anderson
- Lorne Anderson
- Matt Anderson
- Mikey Anderson
- Murray Anderson
- Perry Anderson
- Ron Anderson (born 1945)
- Ron Anderson (born 1950)
- Russ Anderson
- Shawn Anderson
- Tommy Anderson
- Jaret Anderson-Dolan
- Erik Andersson
- Joakim Andersson
- Jonas Andersson
- Kent-Erik Andersson
- Lias Andersson
- Mikael Andersson
- Niklas Andersson
- Peter Andersson (born 1962)
- Peter Andersson (born 1965)
- Rasmus Andersson
- Steve Andrascik
- Emil Andrae
- Paul Andrea
- Andy Andreoff
- Lloyd Andrews
- Dave Andreychuk
- Sven Andrighetto
- Alexander Andrijevski
- Ron Andruff
- Greg Andrusak
- Mike Angelidis
- Anthony Angello
- Mel Angelstad
- Tyler Angle
- Lou Angotti
- Darrell Anholt
- Artem Anisimov
- Justus Annunen
- Hub Anslow
- Victor Antipin
- Mike Antonovich
- Shawn Antoski
- Nik Antropov
- Ken Appleby
- Mason Appleton
- Syl Apps
- Syl Apps Jr.

== Ar–Ay ==
- Al Arbour
- Amos Arbour
- Ernest "Ty" Arbour
- Jack Arbour
- John Arbour
- Michel Archambault
- Darren Archibald
- Dave Archibald
- Jim Archibald
- Josh Archibald
- Mark Arcobello
- Ron Areshenkoff
- Denis Arkhipov
- Joel Armia
- Bill Armstrong
- Bob Armstrong
- Chris Armstrong
- Colby Armstrong
- Derek Armstrong
- George Armstrong
- Murray Armstrong
- Norm "Red" Armstrong
- Riley Armstrong
- Tim Armstrong
- Chuck Arnason
- Tyler Arnason
- Jamie Arniel
- Scott Arniel
- Bill Arnold
- Jason Arnott
- Dean Arsene
- Fred Arthur
- Evgeny Artyukhin
- John Arundel
- Magnus Arvedson
- Viktor Arvidsson
- Arron Asham
- Barry Ashbee
- Don Ashby
- Brent Ashton
- Carter Ashton
- Frank Ashworth
- Yaroslav Askarov
- Tom Askey
- Oscar "Ossie" Asmundson
- Rasmus Asplund
- Kaspars Astashenko
- Mark Astley
- Zach Aston-Reese
- Hardy Astrom
- Walt Atanas
- Blair Atcheynum
- Andreas Athanasiou
- Cam Atkinson
- Steve Atkinson
- Ronnie Attard
- Bob Attwell
- Ron Attwell
- Nicolas Aube-Kubel
- Jean-Sebastien Aubin
- Norm Aubin
- Serge Aubin
- Pierre Aubry
- Oscar Aubuchon
- Adrian Aucoin
- Keith Aucoin
- Philippe Audet
- Donald Audette
- Les Auge
- Justin Auger
- Patrik Augusta
- Alex Auld
- Keith Aulie
- Jared Aulin
- Larry Aurie
- Brady Austin
- Yohann Auvitu
- Sean Avery
- Don Awrey
- P. J. Axelsson
- David Ayres
- Vernon Ayres

== See also ==
- hockeydb.com NHL Player List - A
