= List of NHL players (X–Z) =

This is a list of National Hockey League (NHL) players who have played at least one game in the NHL from 1917 to present and have a last name that starts with "X", "Y" or "Z."

List updated as of the 2018–19 NHL season.

== X ==
- Arber Xhekaj

== Y ==
- Jeremy Yablonski
- Vitali Yachmenev
- Ken Yackel
- Terry Yake
- Bogdan Yakimov
- Egor Yakovlev
- Mikhail Yakubov
- Nail Yakupov
- Dmitriy Yakushin
- Kailer Yamamoto
- Keith Yandle
- Gary Yaremchuk
- Ken Yaremchuk
- Alexei Yashin
- Ross Yates
- Trent Yawney
- Alexei Yegorov
- Alexander Yelesin
- Stephane Yelle
- Vitali Yeremeyev
- Brandon Yip
- Juha Ylonen
- Nolan Yonkman
- Cam York
- Harry York
- Jason York
- Mike York
- B. J. Young
- Brian Young
- Bryan Young
- C. J. Young
- Doug Young
- Howie Young
- Scott Young
- Tim Young
- Warren Young
- Wendell Young
- Tom Younghans
- Paul Ysebaert
- Danil Yurtaikin
- Dmitri Yushkevich
- Steve Yzerman

== Z ==
- Matt Zaba
- Libor Zabransky
- Pavel Zacha
- Filip Zadina
- Nikita Zadorov
- Artyom Zagidulin
- Miles Zaharko
- Rod Zaine
- Nikita Zaitsev
- Travis Zajac
- Zarley Zalapski
- Miroslav Zalesak
- Steven Zalewski
- Rob Zamuner
- Mike Zanier
- Greg Zanon
- Joe Zanussi
- Ron Zanussi
- Connor Zary
- Jeff Zatkoff
- Brad Zavisha
- Jakub Zboril
- Richard Zednik
- Trevor Zegras
- Jeff Zehr
- Larry Zeidel
- John Zeiler
- Valeri Zelepukin
- Olen Zellweger
- Richard Zemlak
- Ed Zeniuk
- Jason Zent
- Rob Zepp
- Henrik Zetterberg
- Fabian Zetterlund
- Lars Zetterstrom
- Rob Zettler
- Peter Zezel
- Alexei Zhamnov
- Vladimir Zharkov
- Nikolay Zherdev
- Alexei Zhitnik
- Sergei Zholtok
- Mika Zibanejad
- Marek Zidlicky
- Thomas Ziegler
- Mike Zigomanis
- Dwayne Zinger
- Sergei Zinovjev
- Tomas Zizka
- Doug Zmolek
- Martin Zoborosky
- Radim Zohorna
- Harry Zolnierczyk
- Rick Zombo
- Artyom Zub
- Ilya Zubov
- Sergei Zubov
- Dainius Zubrus
- Mats Zuccarello
- Jason Zucker
- Mike Zuke
- Rudy Zunich
- Valentin Zykov
- Andrei Zyuzin

== See also ==
- hockeydb.com NHL Player List - X
- hockeydb.com NHL Player List - Y
- hockeydb.com NHL Player List - Z
