= List of NHL players (O) =

This is a list of National Hockey League (NHL) players who have played at least one game in the NHL from 1917 to present and have a last name that starts with "O".

List updated as of the 2018–19 NHL season.

== O' ==
- Dennis O'Brien
- Doug O'Brien
- Ellard "Obie" O'Brien
- Jim O'Brien
- Liam O'Brien
- Shane O'Brien
- Jack O'Callahan
- Mike O'Connell
- Herbert "Buddy" O'Connor
- Drew O'Connor
- Logan O'Connor
- Matt O'Connor
- Myles O'Connor
- Eric O'Dell
- Fred O'Donnell
- Sean O'Donnell
- Don O'Donoghue
- Billy O'Dwyer
- Gerry O'Flaherty
- John "Peanuts" O'Flaherty
- Rob O'Gara
- George O'Grady
- Ryan O'Marra
- Jim O'Neil
- Paul O'Neil
- Brian O'Neill
- Jeff O'Neill
- Mike O'Neill
- Tom "Windy" O'Neill
- Wes O'Neill
- Will O'Neill
- Willie O'Ree
- Daniel O'Regan
- Tom O'Regan
- Cal O'Reilly
- Ryan O'Reilly
- Terry O'Reilly
- Danny O'Shea
- Kevin O'Shea
- Chris O'Sullivan
- Patrick O'Sullivan

== Oa–Oz ==
- Adam Oates
- Russell Oatman
- Evan Oberg
- Jaroslav Obsut
- Chris Oddleifson
- Lyle Odelein
- Selmar Odelein
- Jeff Odgers
- Gino Odjick
- Gerry Odrowski
- Johnny Oduya
- Jordan Oesterle
- Jake Oettinger
- Brian Ogilvie
- John Ogrodnick
- Liam Ohgren
- Mattias Ohlund
- Janne Ojanen
- Todd Okerlund
- Nikita Okhotyuk
- Kyle Okposo
- Roman Oksiuta
- Fredrik Olausson
- Oskar Olausson
- Eddie Olczyk
- Jamie Oleksiak
- Steven Oleksy
- Bill Oleschuk
- Danny Olesevich
- Rostislav Olesz
- David Oliver
- Harry Oliver
- Murray Oliver
- Mathieu Olivier
- Krzysztof Oliwa
- Bert Olmstead
- Fredrik Olofsson
- Gustav Olofsson
- Victor Olofsson
- Darryl Olsen
- Dylan Olsen
- Dennis Olson
- Josh Olson
- Christer Olsson
- Peter Olvecky
- Mark Olver
- Jimmie Olvestad
- Linus Omark
- Ben Ondrus
- Bill Orban
- Phil Oreskovic
- Victor Oreskovich
- Gates Orlando
- Jimmy Orlando
- Dave Orleski
- Dmitri Orlov
- Brooks Orpik
- Bobby Orr
- Colton Orr
- Vladimir Orszagh
- Joni Ortio
- Jed Ortmeyer
- Oskar Osala
- Keith Osborne
- Mark Osborne
- Randy Osburn
- Chris Osgood
- T. J. Oshie
- Mark Osiecki
- Zack Ostapchuk
- Jaroslav Otevrel
- Brennan Othmann
- Steve Ott
- Joel Otto
- Maxime Ouellet
- Michel Ouellet
- Xavier Ouellet
- Eddie Ouellette
- Gerry Ouellette
- Ted Ouimet
- Alexander Ovechkin
- Dennis Owchar
- George Owen
- Nathan Oystrick
- Igor Ozhiganov
- Sandis Ozolinsh

== See also ==
- hockeydb.com NHL Player List - O
