= List of Vegas Golden Knights players =

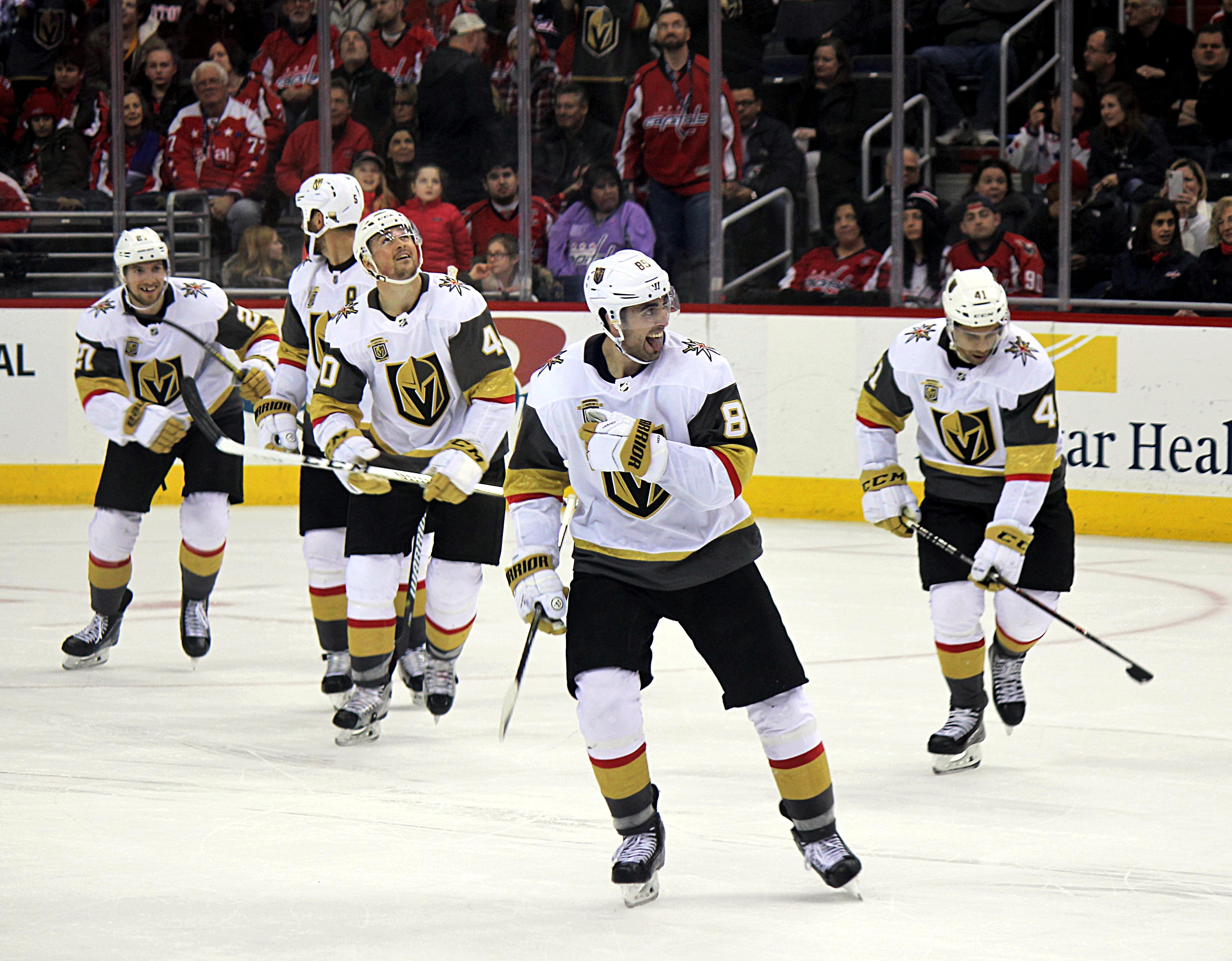
Five Golden Knights players warming up before a game in February 2018

The Vegas Golden Knights are a professional ice hockey franchise located in Las Vegas, Nevada. Founded ahead of the 2017–18 season as an expansion team, they play in the Pacific Division of the Western Conference in the National Hockey League (NHL). The franchise plays its home games at T-Mobile Arena on the Las Vegas Strip in Paradise, Nevada.

As of the conclusion of the 2025–26 season, 119 skaters (forwards and defensemen) and 16 goaltenders have appeared in at least one game for the Golden Knights. With the Golden Knights having reached the Stanley Cup playoffs eight times in nine seasons as a franchise, 64 of these skaters and 7 goaltenders have appeared in at least 1 playoff game. The names of 23 skaters and 4 goaltenders were engraved on the Stanley Cup following the Golden Knights' Stanley Cup Final victory in 2023, with the latter total making the Golden Knights the first team in NHL history to engrave 4 goaltenders on the Cup.

Among skaters, Jonathan Marchessault holds the Golden Knights' all-time regular-season records for goals and points, Following Marchessault's departure in free agency after the 2023–24 season, William Karlsson is the active leader in regular-season goals and points. Mark Stone is the active and all-time leader in playoff goals and points. Shea Theodore is the active and all-time leader in both regular-season and playoff assists, as well as playoff games played. Brayden McNabb is the active and all-time leader in games played and penalty minutes, as well as the active and all-time leader in playoff penalty minutes. Among goaltenders, Marc-Andre Fleury holds most regular-season and playoff records, including games played, wins, losses (including overtime and shootout losses), and shutouts.

Five Golden Knights have received major individual awards. Following the franchise's inaugural season, William Karlsson was awarded the Lady Byng Memorial Trophy as the NHL's most gentlemanly player, while Deryk Engelland was awarded the Mark Messier Leadership Award, given for excellence in on- and off-ice leadership. Marc-Andre Fleury was later awarded the Vezina Trophy as the NHL's best goaltender for the 2020–21 season, with him and Robin Lehner also sharing the William M. Jennings Trophy, awarded for allowing the fewest goals as a team, the same season. Most recently, Jonathan Marchessault was awarded the Conn Smythe Trophy as the most valuable player of the 2023 Stanley Cup playoffs. Mark Stone has served as the Golden Knights' first and thus far only captain since the 2020–21 season.

== Key ==
* Appeared in a Golden Knights game during the 2025–26 season.
^{‡} Played entire NHL career with the Golden Knights.
^{†} Elected to the Hockey Hall of Fame, retired number, or Stanley Cup champion with the Golden Knights.

Abbreviations
Nat	Nationality
GP	Games played
SC	Stanley Cup champion
Ret	Jersey number retired by team
HHOF	Elected to the Hockey Hall of Fame

Nationality (Note: The nationality column lists the player's national team, or country of birth if the player has never competed internationally. The player's national team is listed if it differs from their country of birth. For example, Luca Sbisa was born in Italy, but played for Switzerland internationally; therefore, his nationality is listed as Switzerland.)
(Canada)	Canada
(Czech Republic)	Czech Republic
(Denmark)	Denmark
(Finland)	Finland
(France)	France
(Latvia)	Latvia
(Russia)	Russia
(Slovakia)	Slovakia
(Sweden)	Sweden
(Switzerland)	Switzerland
(United States)	United States

Goaltenders
W	Wins	SO	Shutouts
L	Losses	GAA	Goals against average
OTL	Overtime losses	SV%	Save percentage

Skaters
Pos	Position	C	Center	A	Assists
D	Defenseman	F	Forward	P	Points
LW	Left wing	G	Goals	PIM	Penalty minutes
RW	Right wing				

The seasons column lists the first year of the season of the player's first game and the last year of the season of the player's last game. For example, a player who played one game in the 2018–19 season would be listed as playing with the team from 2018–2019, regardless of what calendar year the game occurred within.

Statistics are complete to the end of the 2025–26 NHL season.

== Goaltenders ==
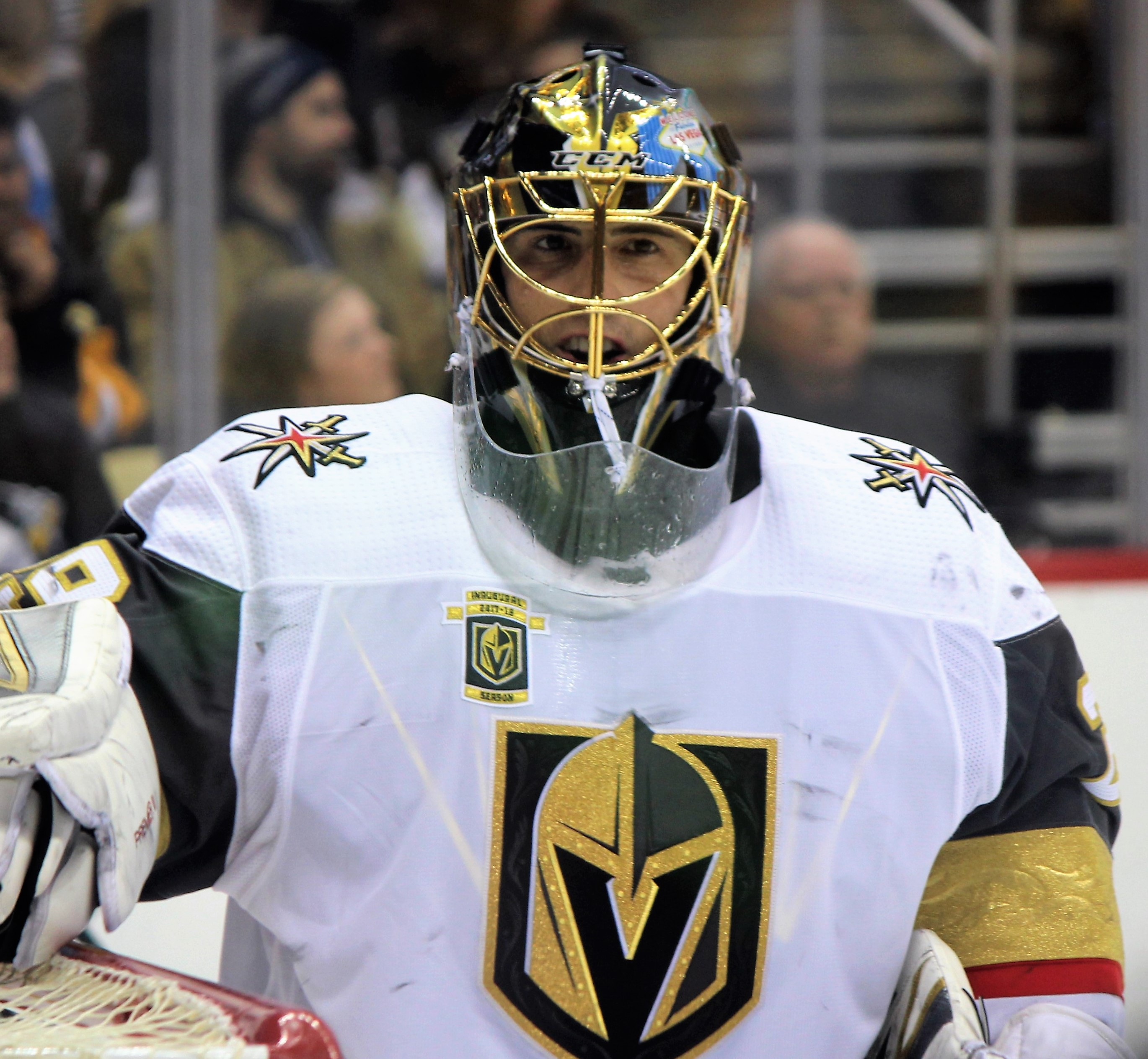
Marc-Andre Fleury played in 46 games during the inaugural season of the Golden Knights, later winning the Vezina Trophy in 2021.

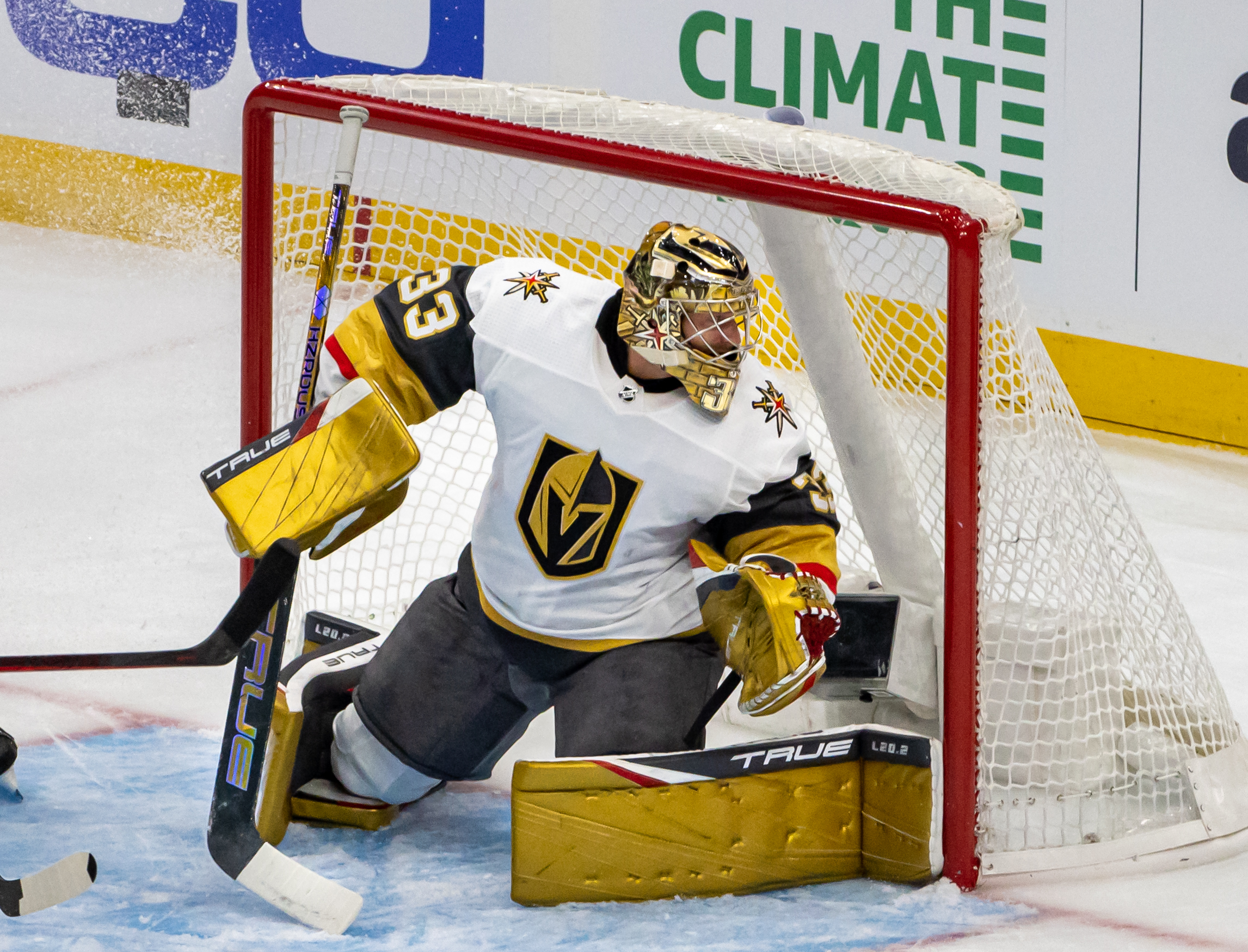
Adin Hill started 14 playoff games in the 2023 Stanley Cup Playoffs, including all five games of Vegas' Cup Final victory.

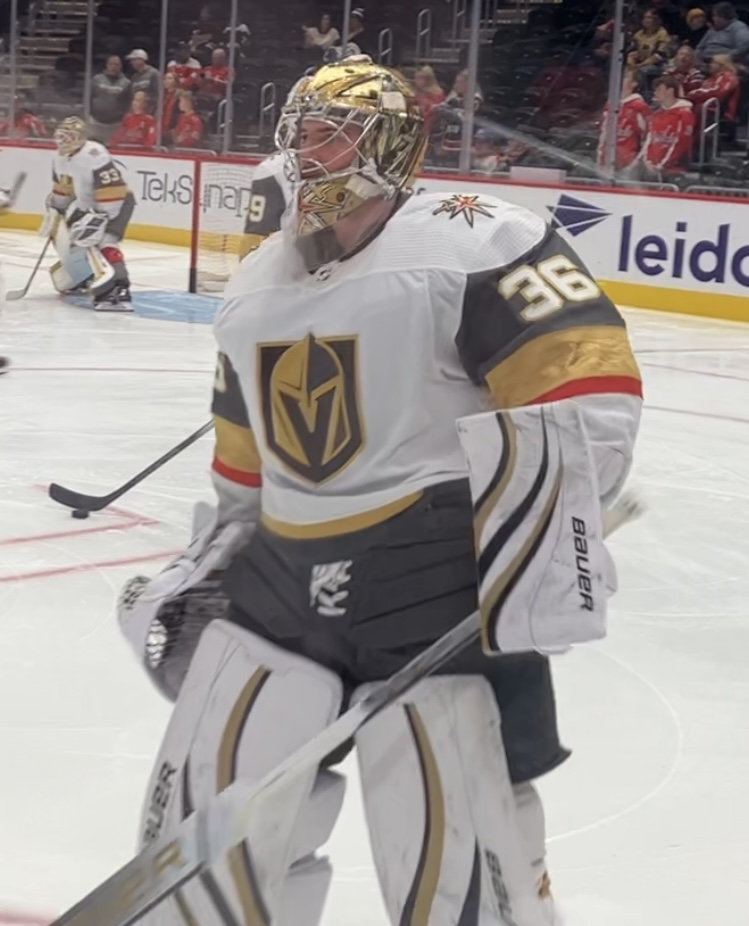
Logan Thompson is one of three goaltenders to have played 100 games with Vegas.

Goaltenders who have played for the franchise (Note: Hockey-Reference.com considers ties in the same category as overtime losses. As the Golden Knights were founded after the NHL abolished ties, they are not included on this table.)
Name	Nat.	Seasons	GP	W	L	OTL	SO	GAA	SV%	GP	W	L	SO	GAA	SV%	Notes
Name	Nat.	Seasons	Regular season							Playoffs						Notes
Laurent Brossoit^{†}	(Canada)	2021–2023	35	17	9	6	1	2.66	.906	8	5	2	0	3.18	.894	SC 2023
Oscar Dansk^{‡}	(Sweden)	2017–2021	6	4	1	0	1	3.10	.906	—	—	—	—	—	—	
Dylan Ferguson	(Canada)	2017–2018	1	0	0	0	0	6.50	.500	—	—	—	—	—	—	
Marc-André Fleury	(Canada)	2017–2021	192	117	60	14	23	2.41	.917	47	28	19	6	2.25	.920	Vezina Trophy – 2020–21; William M. Jennings Trophy – 2020–21
Carter Hart*	(Canada)	2025–present	18	11	3	3	0	2.71	.891	22	14	8	0	2.56	.909	
Adin Hill*^{†}	(Canada)	2022–present	139	77	41	14	7	2.64	.903	30	17	12	3	2.41	.917	SC 2023
Maxime Lagacé	(Canada)	2017–2019	17	6	8	1	0	3.92	.868	—	—	—	—	—	—	
Robin Lehner	(Sweden)	2019–2022	66	39	21	4	3	2.61	.910	19	10	9	4	2.25	.911	William M. Jennings Trophy – 2020–21
Carl Lindbom*^{‡}	(Sweden)	2025–present	8	2	4	2	0	3.00	.873	—	—	—	—	—	—	
Jiří Patera	(Czech Republic)	2022–2024	8	3	3	1	0	3.57	.902	—	—	—	—	—	—	
Jonathan Quick^{†}	(United States)	2022–2023	10	5	2	2	1	3.13	.901	—	—	—	—	—	—	SC 2023
Ilya Samsonov	(Russia)	2024–2025	29	16	9	4	2	2.82	.891	—	—	—	—	—	—	
Akira Schmid*	(Switzerland)	2024–2026	39	18	10	7	2	2.45	.898	—	—	—	—	—	—	
Garret Sparks	(United States)	2019–2020	1	0	0	0	0	4.38	.857	—	—	—	—	—	—	
Malcolm Subban	(Canada)	2017–2020	63	30	21	7	1	2.92	.901	—	—	—	—	—	—	
Logan Thompson^{†}	(Canada)	2020–2024	103	56	32	11	4	2.67	.912	4	2	2	0	2.35	.921	SC 2023

== Skaters ==
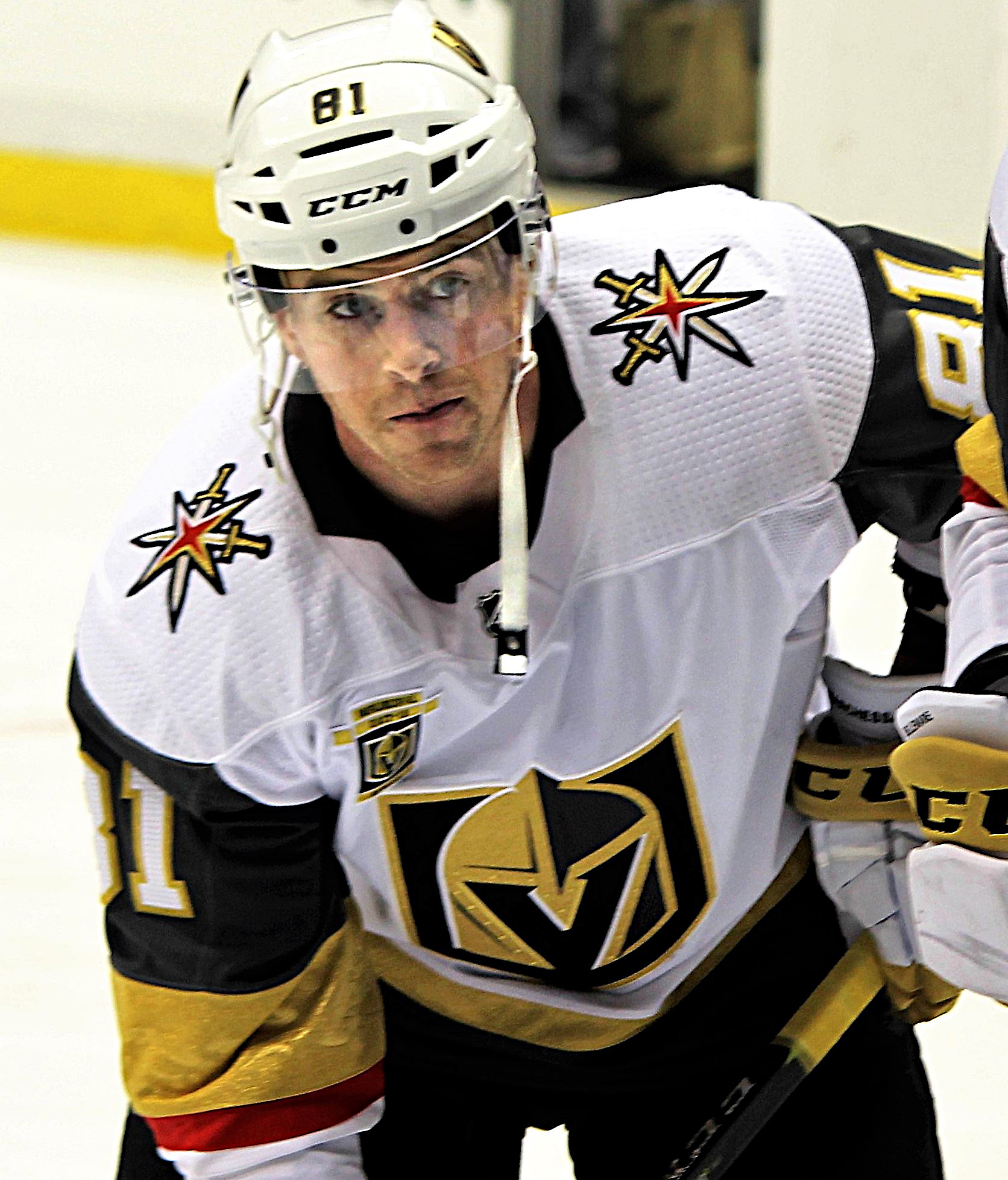
Jonathan Marchessault won the Conn Smythe Trophy with Vegas in 2023, and leads the franchise in goals and points.

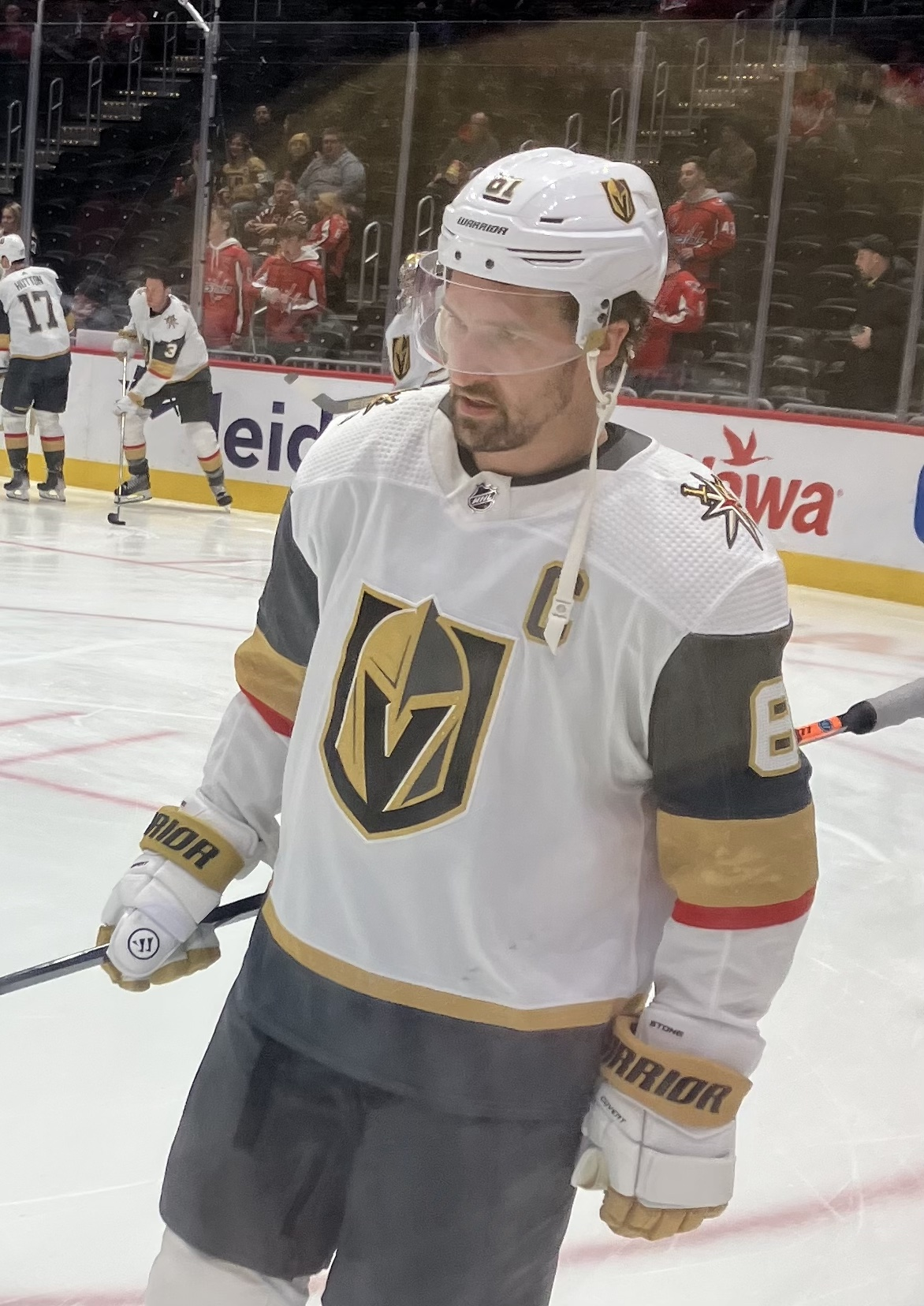
Mark Stone was named Vegas' first captain in 2021, and led the team to its first Stanley Cup championship in 2023.

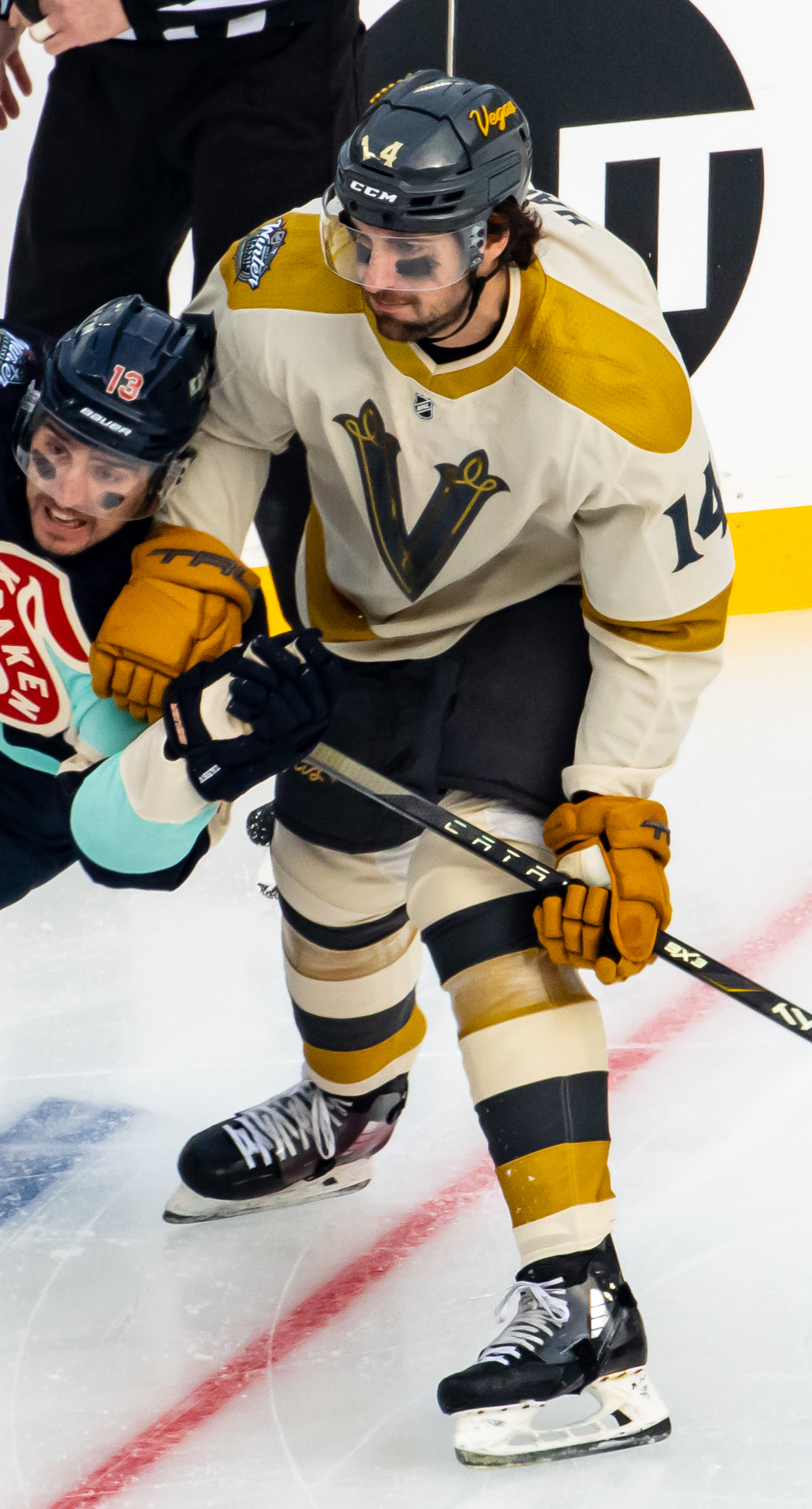
Nicolas Hague has played the most games with Vegas of any of the franchise's draft picks.

Skaters who have played for the franchise
Name	Nat.	Pos.	Seasons	GP	G	A	P	PIM	GP	G	A	P	PIM	Notes
Name	Nat.	Pos.	Seasons	Regular season					Playoffs					Notes
Michael Amadio^{†}	(Canada)	C	2021–2024	193	41	31	72	43	20	6	6	12	4	SC 2023
Rasmus Andersson*	(Sweden)	D	2025–present	33	7	10	17	18	22	0	6	6	18	
Sven Baertschi	(Switzerland)	LW	2021–2022	1	0	0	0	0	—	—	—	—	—	
Ivan Barbashev*^{†}	(Russia)	C	2022–present	257	71	102	173	72	62	14	24	48	32	SC 2023
Pierre-Édouard Bellemare	(France)	LW	2017–2019	148	12	19	31	20	26	0	3	3	16	
Jake Bischoff^{‡}	(United States)	D	2019–2020	4	0	0	0	4	—	—	—	—	—	
Tobias Björnfot	(Sweden)	D	2023–2024	2	0	0	0	2	—	—	—	—	—	
Teddy Blueger^{†}	(Latvia)	C	2022–2023	18	2	4	6	14	6	1	1	2	0	SC 2023
Braeden Bowman*^{‡}	(Canada)	RW	2025–present	54	8	18	24	12	1	0	0	0	0	
Brendan Brisson	(United States)	C	2023–2025	24	2	6	8	2	—	—	—	—	—	
Adam Brooks	(Canada)	C	2021–2022	7	2	0	2	2	—	—	—	—	—	
Patrick Brown	(United States)	C	2019–2021	5	1	0	1	2	14	3	0	3	0	
Callahan Burke	(United States)	C	2024–2025	7	1	0	1	2	—	—	—	—	—	
Ryan Carpenter	(United States)	C	2017–2019	104	14	18	32	17	17	0	5	5	6	
Daniel Carr	(Canada)	LW	2018–2019	6	1	0	1	0	—	—	—	—	—	
William Carrier^{†}	(Canada)	LW	2017–2024	372	53	46	99	183	81	6	7	13	64	SC 2023
Dylan Coghlan*	(Canada)	D	2020–2022; 2025–present	91	6	13	19	22	13	1	2	3	4	
Lukas Cormier^{‡}	(Canada)	D	2023–2024	2	0	1	1	0	—	—	—	—	—	
Paul Cotter^{†}	(United States)	C	2021–2024	138	22	23	45	62	—	—	—	—	—	SC 2023
Nick Cousins	(Canada)	C	2019–2020	7	1	2	3	2	17	0	5	5	22	
Evgenii Dadonov	(Russia)	RW	2021–2022	78	20	23	43	18	—	—	—	—	—	
Grigori Denisenko	(Russia)	LW	2023–2025	7	0	0	0	2	—	—	—	—	—	
Pavel Dorofeyev*^{‡}	(Russia)	LW	2021–2026	231	92	57	149	74	31	13	5	18	2	
Nic Dowd*	(United States)	C	2025–present	20	1	4	5	20	22	3	1	4	8	
Cody Eakin	(Canada)	C	2017–2020	199	37	41	78	54	27	5	1	6	21	
Jack Eichel*^{†}	(United States)	C	2021–present	315	127	216	343	69	62	12	53	65	30	SC 2023
Deryk Engelland	(Canada)	D	2017–2020	202	8	33	41	79	27	0	3	3	34	Mark Messier Leadership Award – 2017–18
Byron Froese	(Canada)	C	2022–2024	25	1	2	3	8	—	—	—	—	—	
Jason Garrison	(Canada)	D	2017–2018	8	0	1	1	4	—	—	—	—	—	
Cody Glass	(Canada)	C	2019–2021	66	9	13	22	14	1	0	0	0	0	
Robert Hägg	(Sweden)	D	2024–2025	2	0	0	0	0	—	—	—	—	—	
Nicolas Hague^{†}	(Canada)	D	2019–2025	364	20	63	83	235	44	3	7	10	52	SC 2023
Noah Hanifin*	(United States)	D	2023–present	170	15	64	79	30	40	3	14	17	4	
Erik Haula	(Finland)	LW	2017–2019	91	31	31	62	47	20	3	6	9	27	
Zack Hayes^{‡}	(Canada)	D	2021–2022	3	0	0	0	0	—	—	—	—	—	
Tomáš Hertl*	(Czech Republic)	C	2023–present	161	58	65	123	59	40	9	11	20	8	
Nick Holden	(Canada)	D	2018–2021	139	9	22	31	29	35	2	6	8	6	
Alexander Holtz*	(Sweden)	RW	2024–present	81	7	14	21	20	—	—	—	—	—	
Brett Howden*^{†}	(Canada)	C	2021–present	311	58	56	114	193	62	23	10	33	41	SC 2023
Brad Hunt	(Canada)	D	2017–2019	58	5	20	25	8	—	—	—	—	—	
Ben Hutton*^{†}	(Canada)	D	2021–2026	196	14	34	48	74	10	0	1	1	4	SC 2023
Tomáš Hyka^{‡}	(Czech Republic)	RW	2017–2019	27	2	5	7	2	—	—	—	—	—	
Mattias Janmark	(Sweden)	C	2020–2022	82	10	20	30	23	16	4	4	8	0	
Ben Jones	(Canada)	C	2021–2022	2	0	0	0	2	—	—	—	—	—	
Tomáš Jurčo	(Slovakia)	RW	2020–2021	8	0	1	1	0	—	—	—	—	—	
William Karlsson*^{†}	(Sweden)	C	2017–present	569	165	238	403	98	121	34	46	80	12	SC 2023; Lady Byng Memorial Trophy – 2017–18
Phil Kessel^{†}	(United States)	RW	2022–2023	82	14	22	36	30	4	0	2	2	2	SC 2023
Keegan Kolesar*^{†‡}	(Canada)	RW	2019–2026	439	44	76	120	323	77	4	7	11	68	SC 2023
Kaedan Korczak*^{‡}	(Canada)	D	2021–2026	155	4	33	37	36	14	0	3	3	0	
Peyton Krebs	(Canada)	C	2020–2022	13	0	1	1	2	—	—	—	—	—	
Tanner Laczynski*	(United States)	C	2024–present	18	1	5	6	10	—	—	—	—	—	
Jérémy Lauzon*	(Canada)	D	2025–present	68	1	12	13	89	12	0	0	0	6	
Raphaël Lavoie*	(Canada)	C	2024–present	10	0	0	0	2	—	—	—	—	—	
Brendan Leipsic	(Canada)	LW	2017–2018	44	2	11	13	4	—	—	—	—	—	
Jake Leschyshyn	(Canada)	C	2021–2023	63	2	4	6	16	—	—	—	—	—	
Oscar Lindberg	(Sweden)	LW	2017–2019	98	13	10	23	38	3	0	1	1	2	
Anthony Mantha	(Canada)	RW	2023–2024	18	3	7	10	8	3	0	0	0	2	
Jonathan Marchessault^{†}	(Canada)	C (Note: Marchessault is listed as a center by the NHL and Hockey Reference, but is listed as a winger at other sources.)	2017–2024	514	192	225	417	256	95	36	39	75	60	SC 2023; Conn Smythe Trophy – 2023
Mitch Marner*	(Canada)	RW	2025–present	81	24	56	80	24	22	10	19	29	6	
Alec Martinez^{†}	(United States)	D	2019–2024	221	21	58	79	57	67	8	13	21	17	SC 2023
Stefan Matteau	(United States)	C	2017–2018	8	0	1	1	0	—	—	—	—	—	
Brayden McNabb*^{†}	(Canada)	D	2017–present	647	31	110	141	348	120	6	30	36	81	SC 2023
Jaycob Megna*	(United States)	D	2025–present	4	0	0	0	2	—	—	—	—	—	
Jon Merrill	(United States)	D	2017–2020	140	6	19	25	107	16	0	1	1	10	
Colin Miller	(Canada)	D	2017–2019	147	13	57	70	97	26	4	6	10	20	
Daniil Miromanov	(Russia)	D	2021–2024	29	2	5	7	4	—	—	—	—	—	
Mason Morelli^{‡}	(United States)	LW	2023–2025	10	3	1	4	0	—	—	—	—	—	
James Neal	(Canada)	LW	2017–2018	71	25	19	44	24	20	6	5	11	12	
Tomáš Nosek	(Czech Republic)	LW	2017–2021	240	31	34	65	62	38	6	4	10	28	
Victor Olofsson	(Sweden)	RW	2024–2025	56	15	14	29	16	9	2	2	4	0	
Brayden Pachal^{†}	(Canada)	D	2021–2024	29	1	2	3	20	1	0	0	0	2	SC 2023
Max Pacioretty	(United States)	LW	2018–2022	224	97	97	194	127	36	15	15	30	20	
Nolan Patrick	(Canada)	C	2021–2022	25	2	5	7	6	—	—	—	—	—	
Tanner Pearson	(Canada)	LW	2024–2025	78	12	15	27	8	8	0	1	1	0	
David Perron	(Canada)	LW	2017–2018	70	16	50	66	50	15	1	8	9	10	
Alex Pietrangelo^{†}	(Canada)	D	2020–2025	329	39	148	187	114	57	7	22	29	51	SC 2023
Brandon Pirri	(Canada)	C	2017–2020	49	15	8	23	14	1	0	0	0	0	
Derrick Pouliot	(Canada)	D	2021–2022	2	0	1	1	2	—	—	—	—	—	
Gage Quinney^{‡}	(United States)	C	2019–2020	3	0	1	1	0	—	—	—	—	—	
Ryan Reaves	(Canada)	RW	2017–2021	209	18	24	42	158	48	2	5	7	65	
Cole Reinhardt*	(Canada)	LW	2025–2026	44	3	4	7	19	—	—	—	—	—	
Sheldon Rempal	(Canada)	RW	2022–2024	10	2	1	3	4	—	—	—	—	—	
Jonas Røndbjerg*^{‡}	(Denmark)	RW	2021–present	80	3	8	11	8	—	—	—	—	—	
Nicolas Roy^{†}	(Canada)	C	2019–2025	362	68	98	166	169	79	10	22	32	59	SC 2023
Brandon Saad*	(United States)	LW	2024–2026	78	9	14	23	14	13	0	4	4	2	
Luca Sbisa	(Switzerland)	D	2017–2018	30	2	12	14	15	12	0	4	4	8	
Nate Schmidt	(United States)	D	2017–2020	196	21	76	97	36	47	5	15	20	10	
Jimmy Schuldt	(United States)	D	2018–2019	1	0	1	1	0	—	—	—	—	—	
Cole Schwindt	(Canada)	RW	2024–2025	42	1	7	8	2	1	0	0	0	0	
Vadim Shipachyov^{‡}	(Russia)	C	2017–2018	3	1	0	1	2	—	—	—	—	—	
Dylan Sikura	(Canada)	F	2020–2021	6	2	0	2	0	2	0	0	0	0	
Colton Sissons*	(Canada)	C	2025–2026	66	6	5	11	28	22	2	6	8	6	
Cole Smith*	(United States)	LW	2025–2026	21	2	0	2	9	22	3	3	6	24	
Reilly Smith*^{†}	(Canada)	RW	2017–2023; 2024–2026	489	143	180	323	106	106	21	51	72	42	SC 2023
Paul Stastny	(United States)	C	2018–2020	121	30	50	80	54	25	5	12	17	10	
Chandler Stephenson^{†}	(Canada)	C	2019–2024	327	75	162	237	116	65	13	19	32	42	SC 2023
Mark Stone*^{†}	(Canada)	RW	2018–present	400	136	260	396	123	102	43	41	84	28	SC 2023; Captain, 2021–present
Tomáš Tatar	(Slovakia)	LW	2017–2018	20	4	2	6	10	8	1	1	2	2	
Shea Theodore*^{†}	(Canada)	D	2017–present	581	83	302	385	171	127	21	62	83	52	SC 2023
Alex Tuch	(United States)	RW	2017–2021	249	61	78	139	71	66	19	14	33	34	
Kai Uchacz*^{‡}	(Canada)	C	2025–present	3	0	0	0	5	—	—	—	—	—	
Zach Whitecloud*^{†}	(Canada)	D	2017–2026	368	23	55	78	178	78	5	12	17	53	SC 2023
Valentin Zykov	(Russia)	RW	2018–2020	25	3	3	6	6	—	—	—	—	—	
