= List of NHL players (N) =

This is a list of National Hockey League (NHL) players who have played at least one game in the NHL from 1917 to present and have a last name that starts with "N".

List updated as of the 2018–19 NHL season.

== Na–Nd ==
- Dmitri Nabokov
- Evgeni Nabokov
- Don Nachbaur
- Bradly Nadeau
- Ladislav Nagy
- Jim Nahrgang
- Jakub Nakladal
- Evgeny Namestnikov
- Vladislav Namestnikov
- Lou Nanne
- Rich Nantais
- Mark Napier
- Brendon Nash
- Rick Nash
- Riley Nash
- Tyson Nash
- Markus Naslund
- Mats Naslund
- Alain Nasreddine
- Joonas Nattinen
- Ralph Nattrass
- Ric Nattress
- Mike Natyshak
- Gregg Naumenko
- Frank Nazar
- Andrei Nazarov
- Rumun Ndur

== Ne ==
- James Neal
- Patrick Neaton
- Martin Necas
- Victor Nechayev
- Stan Neckar
- Alex Nedeljkovic
- Vaclav Nedomansky
- Andrej Nedorost
- Vaclav Nederost
- Petr Nedved
- Zdenek Nedved
- Mike Needham
- Bob Neely
- Cam Neely
- John Negrin
- Jake Neighbours
- Chris Neil
- Jim Neilson
- Brock Nelson
- Casey Nelson
- Gord Nelson
- Jeff Nelson
- Todd Nelson
- Sergei Nemchinov
- Simon Nemec
- Jan Nemecek
- Patrik Nemeth
- Steve Nemeth
- David Nemirovsky
- Greg Nemisz
- Aaron Ness
- Eric Nesterenko
- Nikita Nesterenko
- Nikita Nesterov
- Andrej Nestrasil
- Lance Nethery
- Ray Neufeld
- Michal Neuvirth
- Mike Neville
- Bob Nevin
- John Newberry
- Kris Newbury
- Rick Newell
- Alex Newhook
- Dan Newman
- John Newman
- Cam Newton

== Ni ==
- Scott Nichol
- Bernie Nicholls
- Al Nicholson
- Eddie Nicholson
- Ivan "Hickey" Nicholson
- Neil Nicholson
- Paul Nicholson
- Valeri Nichushkin
- Eric Nickulas
- Graeme Nicolson
- Barry Nieckar
- Rob Niedermayer
- Scott Niedermayer
- Nino Niederreiter
- Jim Niekamp
- Chris Nielsen
- Frans Nielsen
- Markus Niemelainen
- Jeff Nielsen
- Kirk Nielsen
- Antti Niemi
- Antti-Jussi Niemi
- Ville Nieminen
- Kraig Nienhuis
- Matthew Nieto
- Joe Nieuwendyk
- Boo Nieves
- Frank Nighbor
- Frank Nigro
- Janne Niinimaa
- Antero Niittymaki
- Nikita Nikitin
- Andrei Nikolishin
- Sami Niku
- Alexander Nikulin
- Igor Nikulin
- Chris Nilan
- Jim Nill
- Marcus Nilson
- Anders Nilsson
- Jacob Nilsson
- Kent Nilsson
- Robert Nilsson
- Ulf Nilsson
- Cristopher Nilstorp
- Janne Niskala
- Matt Niskanen
- Lou Nistico

== No ==
- Reg Noble
- Andreas Nodl
- Claude Noel
- Stefan Noesen
- Nelson Nogier
- Petteri Nokelainen
- Brandon Nolan
- Jordan Nolan
- Owen Nolan
- Pat Nolan
- Ted Nolan
- Simon Nolet
- Brian Noonan
- Niklas Nordgren
- Robert Nordmark
- Jonas Nordqvist
- Joakim Nordstrom
- Peter Nordstrom
- Maxim Noreau
- Joe Noris
- Mattias Norlinder
- Mika Noronen
- Fredrik Norrena
- Dwayne Norris
- Jack Norris
- Josh Norris
- Rod Norrish
- Mattias Norstrom
- Lawrence "Baldy" Northcott
- Brad Norton
- Jeff Norton
- Craig Norwich
- Lee Norwood
- Tomas Nosek
- Filip Novak
- Tommy Novak
- Ivan Novoseltsev
- Jiri Novotny
- Milan Novy
- Hank Nowak

== Nu–Ny ==
- Ryan Nugent-Hopkins
- Petteri Nummelin
- Teppo Numminen
- Kai Nurminen
- Pasi Nurminen
- Darnell Nurse
- Markus Nutivaara
- Lawrence Nycholat
- Joakim Nygard
- Mike Nykoluk
- Alexander Nylander
- Michael Nylander
- William Nylander
- Gary Nylund
- Gustav Nyquist
- Bill Nyrop
- Bob Nystrom
- Eric Nystrom

== See also ==
- hockeydb.com NHL Player List - N
