= List of Atlanta Thrashers players =

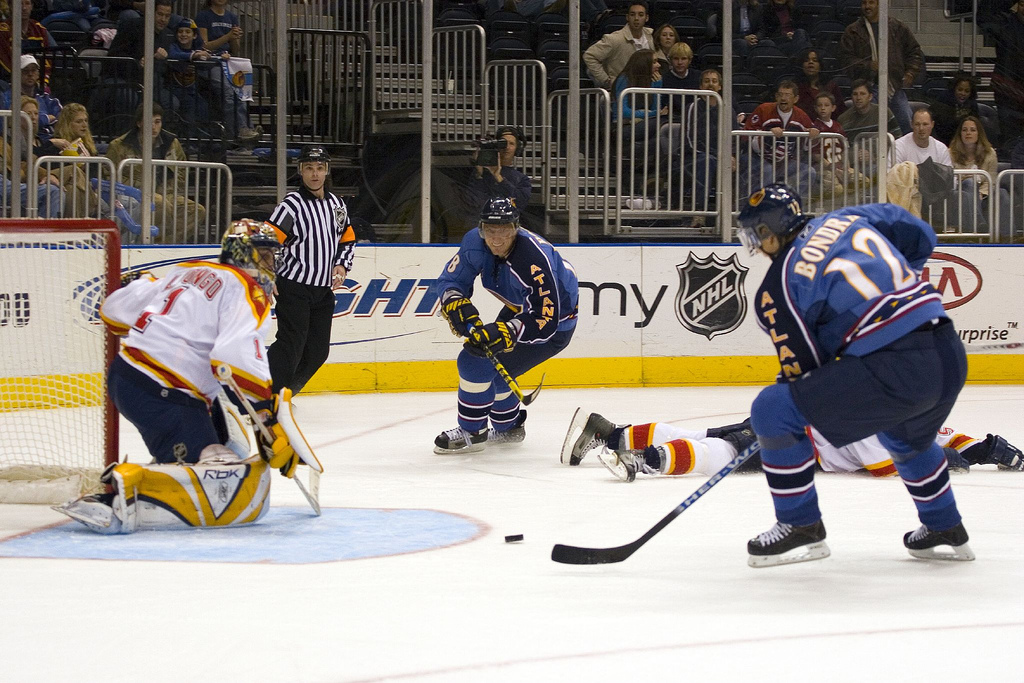
Thrashers players on the attack against the Florida Panthers.

The Atlanta Thrashers were an ice hockey team based in Atlanta, Georgia, United States. They were members of the Southeast Division of the Eastern Conference in the National Hockey League (NHL). The Thrashers joined the NHL in 1999 as an expansion franchise, and over 200 players have worn a Thrashers uniform since that time. The Thrashers won the Southeast Division and reached the playoffs for the first time in team history in 2006–07.

Ilya Kovalchuk is the franchise leader in goals scored (328), assists (287), points (615) and games (594). Early in 2009, Kovalchuk was named the seventh captain in franchise history. Kari Lehtonen leads the franchise in most goaltending categories, including games played (204), wins (94) and shutouts (14). At the end of the 2010–11 season the team was purchased by True North Sports & Entertainment and moved to Winnipeg, Manitoba, Canada for the start of the 2011–12 season and became the Winnipeg Jets.

== Key ==
- Current NHL player.
- Hockey Hall of Famer

Abbreviations
C	Center
D	Defenseman
L	Left wing
R	Right wing

Goaltenders
W	Wins
L	Losses
T	Ties
OTL ^{a}	Overtime losses
SO	Shutouts
GAA	Goals against average
SV%	Save percentage

Skaters
GP	Games played
G	Goals
A	Assists
Pts	Points
PIM	Penalty minutes

The "Seasons" column lists the first year of the season of the player's first game and the last year of the season of the player's last game. For example, a player who played one game in the 2000–2001 season would be listed as playing with the team from 2000–2001, regardless of what calendar year the game occurred within.

== Skaters ==
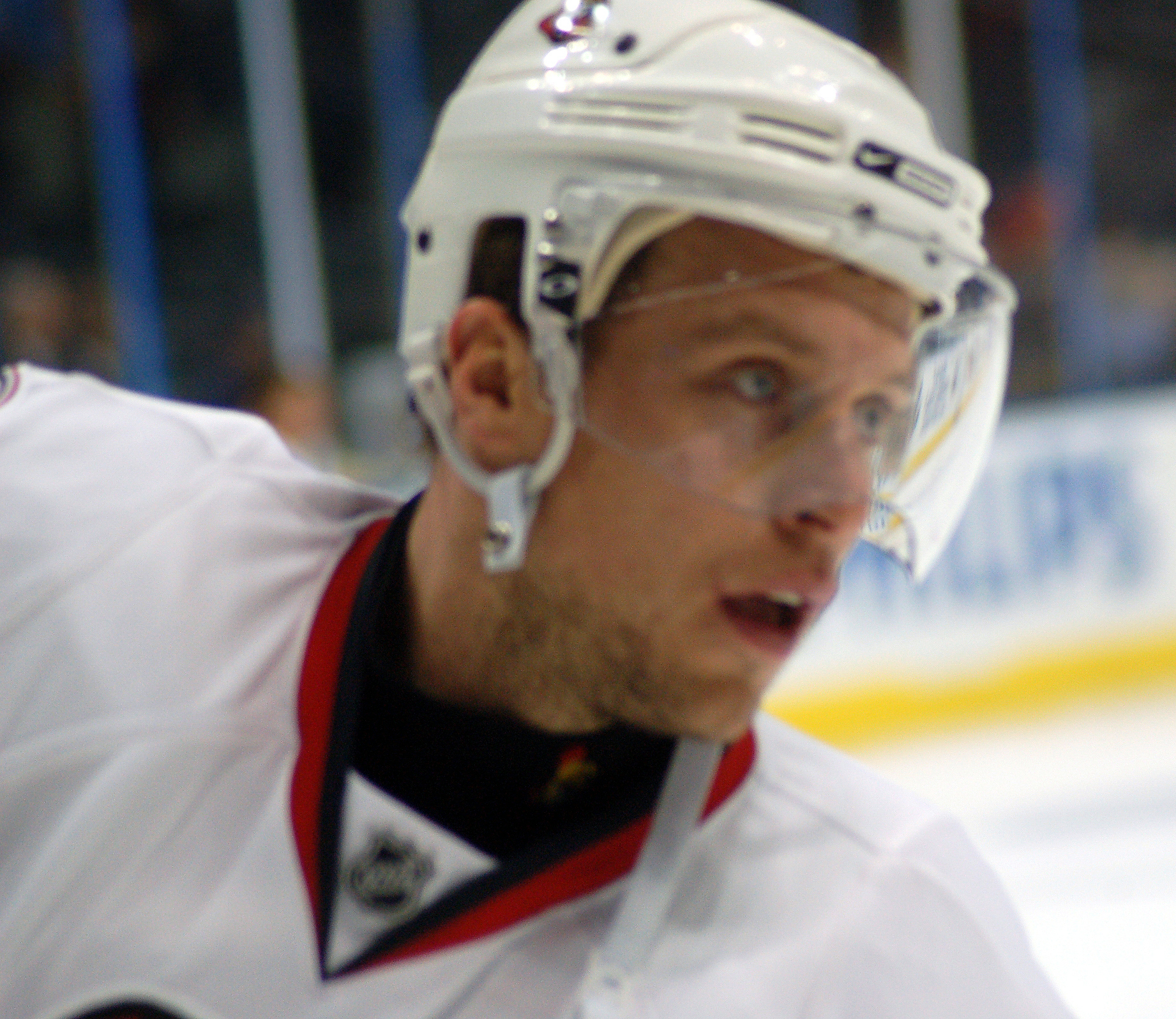
Shown here with the Ottawa Senators, Dany Heatley spent the first three years of his NHL career with the Thrashers.

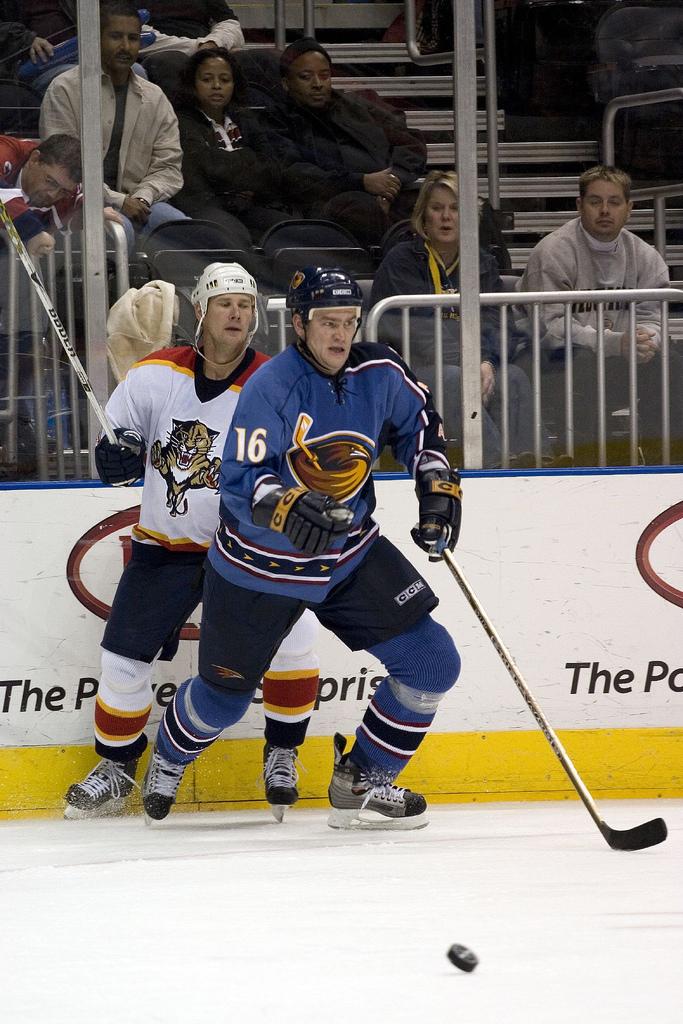
Bobby Holik, who joined the Thrashers in 2005, was named captain for the 2007–08 season, his last in Atlanta.

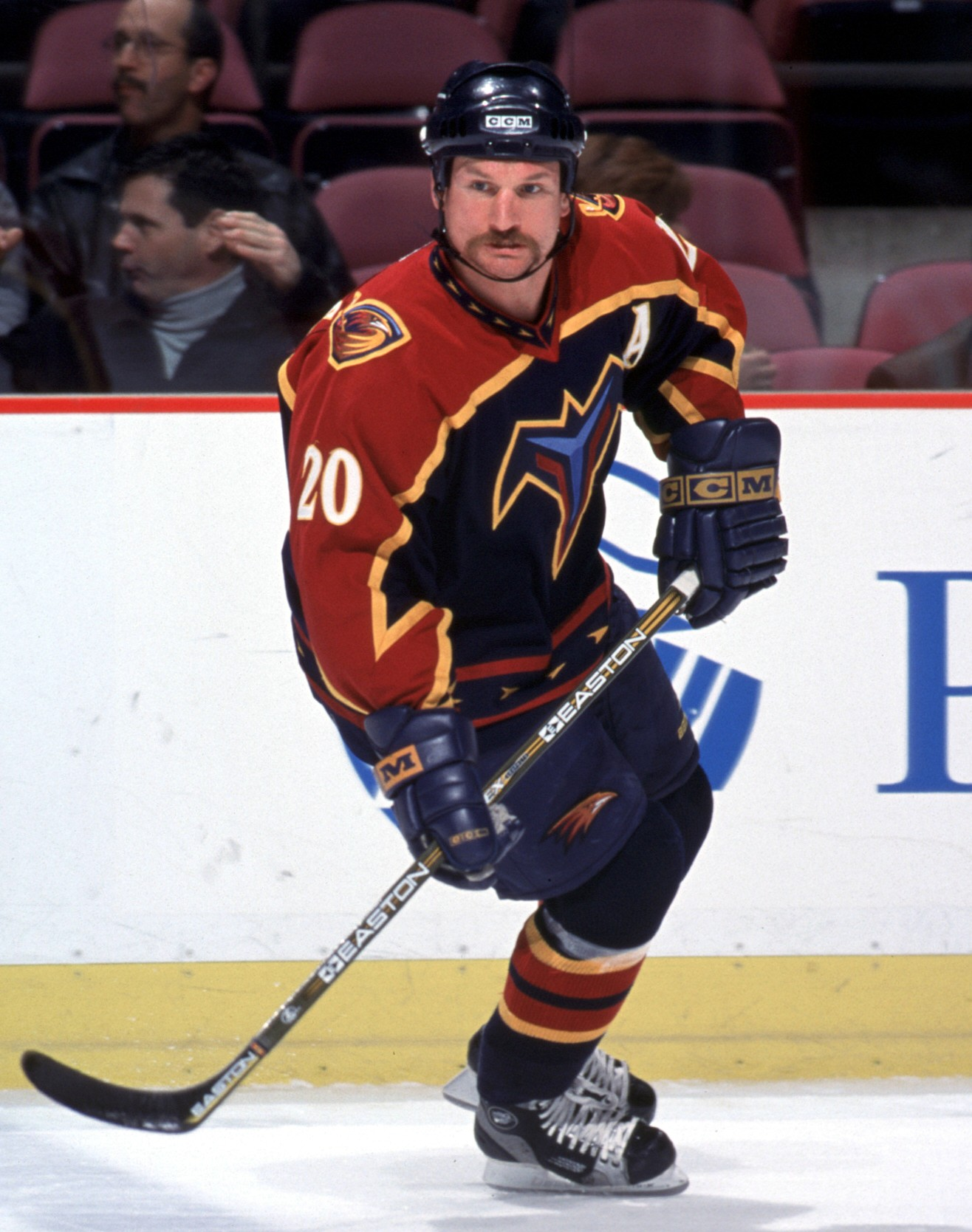
Jeff Odgers played in 202 games for the Thrashers

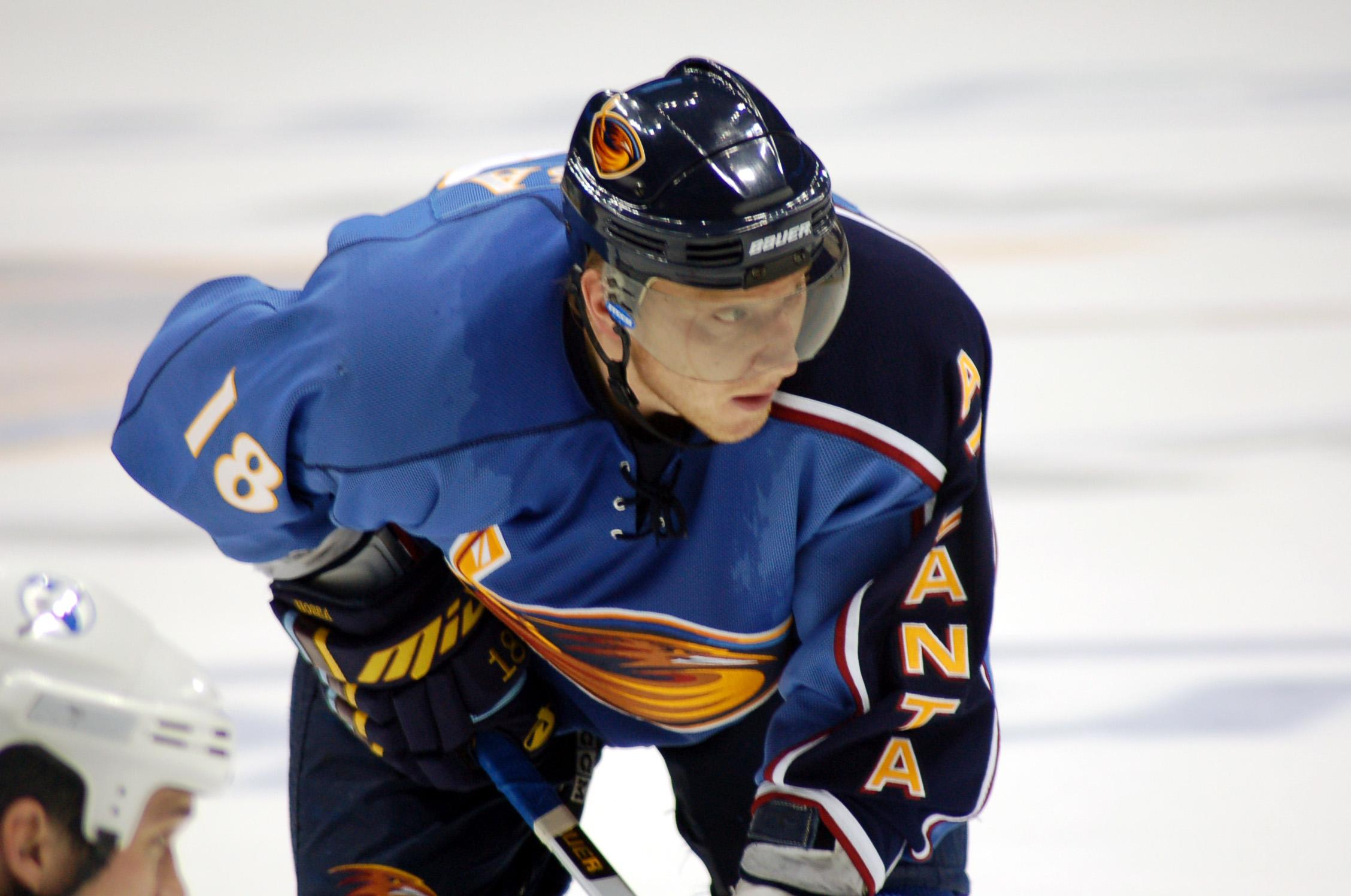
Traded to Atlanta in 2005, Marian Hossa spent three years with the team and was the first to score 100 points with the Thrashers, doing so in 2006–07.

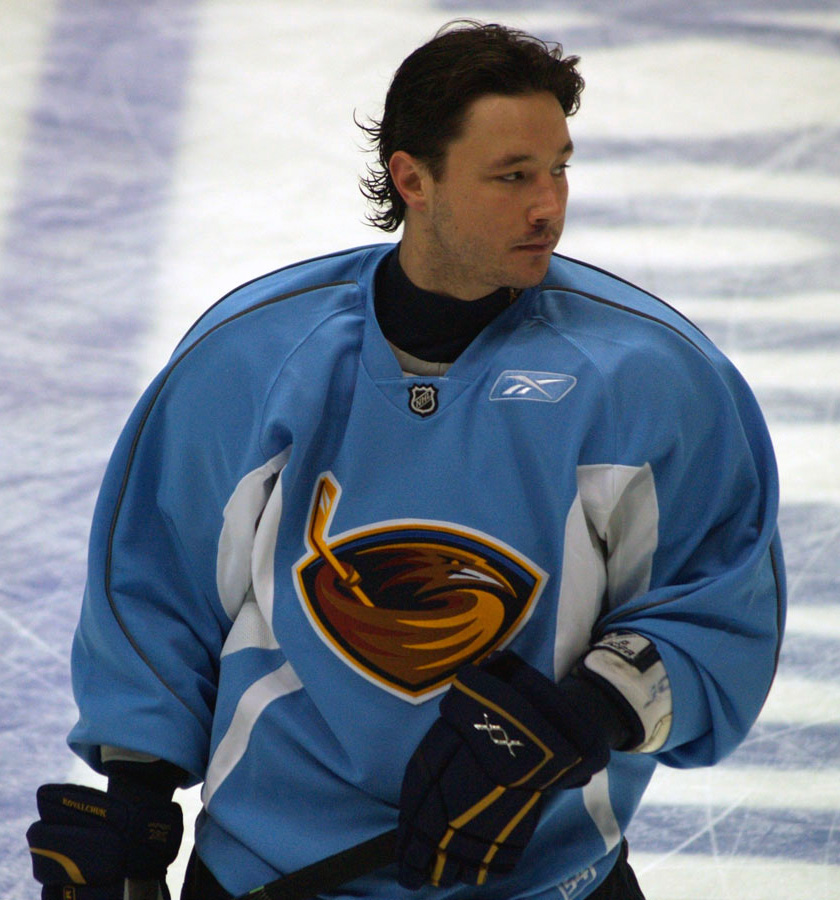
Ilya Kovalchuk was drafted by the Thrashers in 2001 and played for them until he was traded in 2010. He is the Thrashers all-time leader in games played, goals, assists, and points.

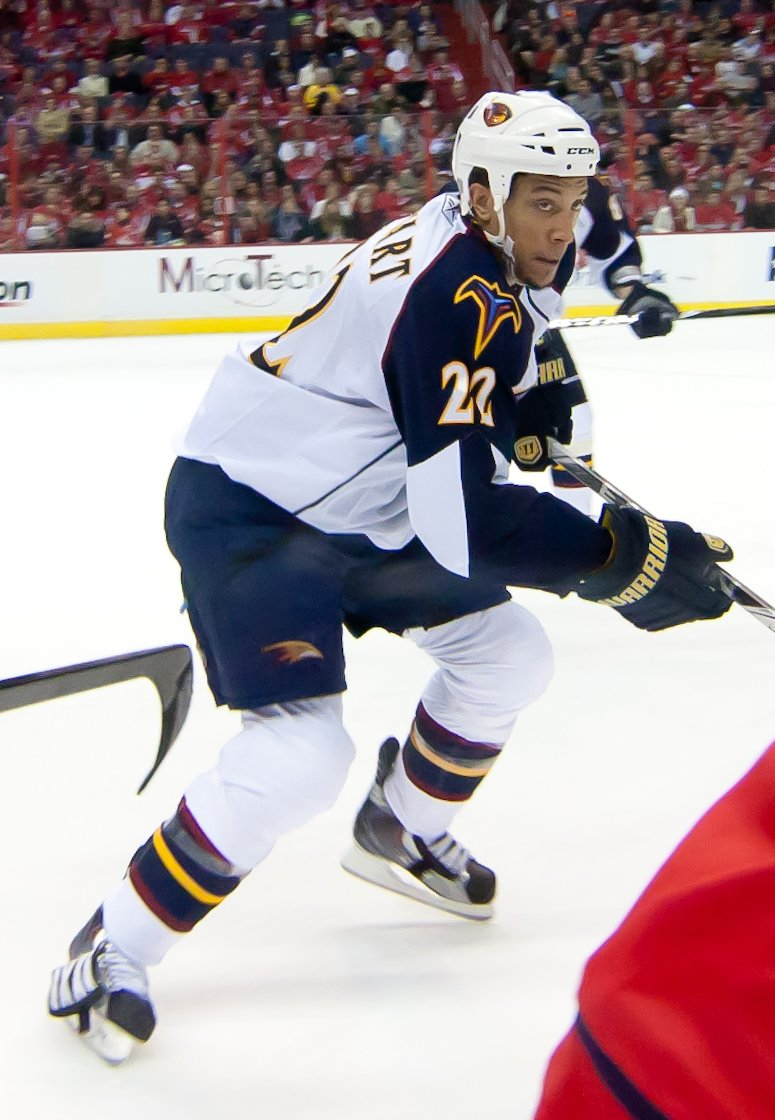
Anthony Stewart scored 14 goals during his one season in Atlanta in 2010–11.

				Regular season					Playoffs				
Player	Team	Position	Years	GP	G	A	Pts	PIM	GP	G	A	Pts	PIM
Ramzi Abid		L	2005–2006	6	0	2	2	6	—	—	—	—	—
Bryan Adams		L	1999–2001	11	0	1	1	2	—	—	—	—	—
Maxim Afinogenov		R	2009–2010	82	24	37	61	46	—	—	—	—	—
Nik Antropov		C	2009–2011	152	40	68	108	86	—	—	—	—	—
Colby Armstrong		R	2007–2010	179	41	39	80	142	—	—	—	—	—
Evgeny Artyukhin		R	2009–2010	17	5	2	7	31	—	—	—	—	—
Serge Aubin		C	2003–2006	140	17	32	49	152	—	—	—	—	—
Donald Audette		R	1999–2001	78	39	43	82	76	—	—	—	—	—
Scott Barney		C	2005–2006	3	0	0	0	0	—	—	—	—	—
Lubos Bartecko		L	2001–2003	108	20	23	43	38	—	—	—	—	—
Eric Belanger		C	2006–2007	24	9	6	15	12	4	1	0	1	12
Niclas Bergfors		R	2009–2011	79	19	27	46	6	—	—	—	—	—
Eric Bertrand		L	1999–2000	8	0	0	0	4	—	—	—	—	—
Zdenek Blatny		L	2002–2004	20	3	0	3	6	—	—	—	—	—
Zach Bogosian	MIN	D	2008–2011	199	24	35	59	137	—	—	—	—	—
Peter Bondra		R	2005–2006	60	21	18	39	40	—	—	—	—	—
Jason Botterill		L	1999–2000	25	1	4	5	17	—	—	—	—	—
Eric Boulton		L	2005–2011	377	22	34	56	639	4	0	0	0	24
Kip Brennan		L	2003–2004	5	0	0	0	17	—	—	—	—	—
Andrew Brunette		L	1999–2001	158	38	71	109	56	—	—	—	—	—
Kelly Buchberger		R	1999–2000	68	5	12	17	139	—	—	—	—	—
Alexander Burmistrov		C	2010–2011	74	6	14	20	27	—	—	—	—	—
Adam Burt		D	2000–2001	27	0	2	2	27	—	—	—	—	—
Yuri Butsayev		L	2001–2003	24	4	0	4	12	—	—	—	—	—
Petr Buzek		D	1999–2002	77	5	14	19	62	—	—	—	—	—
Dustin Byfuglien		R	2010–2011	81	20	33	53	93	—	—	—	—	—
Chris Chelios	2013	D	2009–2010	7	0	0	0	0	—	—	—	—	—
Erik Christensen		C	2007–2009	57	7	16	23	16	—	—	—	—	—
Brett Clark		D	1999–2002	44	1	3	4	18	—	—	—	—	—
Braydon Coburn		D	2005–2007	38	0	5	5	34	—	—	—	—	—
Robert Corkum		C	2001–2002	65	3	4	7	16	—	—	—	—	—
Patrice Cormier		C	2010–2011	21	1	1	2	4	—	—	—	—	—
Daniel Corso		C	2003–2004	7	0	1	1	0	—	—	—	—	—
Jeff Cowan		L	2001–2004	162	16	21	37	233	—	—	—	—	—
Joey Crabb		R	2008–2009	29	4	5	9	28	—	—	—	—	—
Nigel Dawes		L	2010–2011	9	0	1	1	0	—	—	—	—	—
Greg De Vries		D	2005–2007	164	10	49	59	142	4	1	0	1	4
Kevin Dean		D	1999–2000	23	1	0	1	14	—	—	—	—	—
Joe Dipenta		D	2002–2003	3	1	1	2	0	—	—	—	—	—
Kevin Doell		C	2007–2008	8	0	1	1	4	—	—	—	—	—
Hnat Domenichelli		L	1999–2002	130	29	32	61	56	—	—	—	—	—
Shean Donovan		R	1999–2002	144	22	24	46	105	—	—	—	—	—
Pascal Dupuis		R	2006–2008	79	13	7	20	28	4	1	2	3	4
Radek Dvorak		R	2010–2011	13	0	1	1	4	—	—	—	—	—
Ben Eager		L	2010–2011	34	3	7	10	77	—	—	—	—	—
Nelson Emerson		R	1999–2000	58	14	19	33	47	—	—	—	—	—
Toby Enstrom		D	2007–2011	318	26	145	171	178	—	—	—	—	—
Garnet Exelby		D	2002–2009	357	6	40	46	511	4	0	0	0	6
Jeff Farkas		C	2002–2003	3	0	0	0	0	—	—	—	—	—
Rico Fata		L	2005–2006	6	0	1	1	4	—	—	—	—	—
Ray Ferraro		C	1999–2002	223	56	91	147	245	—	—	—	—	—
Kurtis Foster		D	2002–2004	5	0	1	1	0	—	—	—	—	—
Maxim Galanov		D	1999–2000	40	4	3	7	20	—	—	—	—	—
Simon Gamache		L	2002–2004	4	0	1	1	2	—	—	—	—	—
Johan Garpenlov		L	1999–2000	73	2	14	16	31	—	—	—	—	—
Jean-Luc Grand-Pierre		D	2003–2004	27	2	2	4	26	—	—	—	—	—
Stephen Guolla		C	1999–2001	83	16	25	41	27	—	—	—	—	—
Ron Hainsey		D	2008–2011	243	14	70	84	95	—	—	—	—	—
Denis Hamel		L	2006–2007	3	1	0	1	0	—	—	—	—	—
David Harlock		D	1999–2002	128	0	8	8	116	—	—	—	—	—
Mark Hartigan		C	2001–2003	25	5	2	7	8	—	—	—	—	—
Niclas Havelid		D	2005–2009	303	10	72	82	184	4	0	2	2	0
Darren Haydar		R	2006–2008	20	1	7	8	2	—	—	—	—	—
Dany Heatley		L	2001–2004	190	80	101	181	132	—	—	—	—	—
Shawn Heins		D	2003–2004	17	0	4	4	16	—	—	—	—	—
Chris Herperger		L	2002–2003	27	4	1	5	7	—	—	—	—	—
Shane Hnidy		D	2005–2007	138	5	10	15	96	4	1	0	1	0
Bobby Holik		C	2005–2008	228	41	55	96	255	4	0	1	1	0
Darcy Hordichuk		L	2000–2002	44	1	1	2	165	—	—	—	—	—
Marian Hossa	2020	R	2005–2008	222	108	140	248	146	4	0	1	1	6
Anthony Hrkac		C	2001–2003	160	27	43	70	26	—	—	—	—	—
Matt Johnson		L	1999–2000	64	2	5	7	144	—	—	—	—	—
Chris Joseph		D	2000–2001	19	0	3	3	20	—	—	—	—	—
Frantisek Kaberle		D	1999–2004	272	20	82	102	110	—	—	—	—	—
Tomi Kallio		R	2000–2003	121	22	29	51	38	—	—	—	—	—
Evander Kane	VAN	L	2009–2011	139	33	36	69	130	—	—	—	—	—
Niko Kapanen		C	2006–2007	60	4	9	13	20	—	—	—	—	—
Andreas Karlsson		C	1999–2002	153	11	27	38	50	—	—	—	—	—
Geordie Kinnear		D	1999–2000	4	0	0	0	13	—	—	—	—	—
Ken Klee		D	2007–2008	72	1	9	10	60	—	—	—	—	—
Carl Klingberg		L	2010–2011	1	0	0	0	0	—	—	—	—	—
Tomas Kloucek		D	2003–2006	38	0	0	0	27	—	—	—	—	—
Ladislav Kohn		R	2000–2001	26	3	4	7	44	—	—	—	—	—
Ilya Kovalchuk		R	2001–2010	594	328	287	615	429	4	1	1	2	19
Vyacheslav Kozlov		L	2002–2010	537	145	271	416	312	4	0	0	0	6
Jason Krog		C	2006–2007	14	1	3	4	6	—	—	—	—	—
Uwe Krupp		D	2002–2003	4	0	0	0	10	—	—	—	—	—
Pavel Kubina		D	2009–2010	76	6	32	38	66	—	—	—	—	—
Arturs Kulda		D	2009–2011	6	0	2	2	4	—	—	—	—	—
Chris Kunitz		L	2005–2006	2	0	0	0	2	—	—	—	—	—
Joel Kwiatkowski		D	2007–2008	18	0	5	5	20	—	—	—	—	—
Andrew Ladd		L	2010–2011	81	29	30	59	39	—	—	—	—	—
Denny Lambert		L	1999–2001	140	6	13	19	434	—	—	—	—	—
Brad Larsen		L	2003–2008	202	15	17	32	74	4	0	2	2	0
Jordan Lavallee-Smotherman		L	2007–2009	4	1	1	2	0	—	—	—	—	—
Scott Lehman		D	2008–2009	1	0	0	0	0	—	—	—	—	—
Francis Lessard		R	2001–2006	91	1	3	4	268	—	—	—	—	—
Grant Lewis		D	2008–2009	1	0	0	0	0	—	—	—	—	—
Bill Lindsay		L	2003–2004	24	0	0	0	25	—	—	—	—	—
Bryan Little		C	2007–2011	282	68	81	149	95	—	—	—	—	—
Clarke MacArthur		L	2009–2010	21	3	6	9	2	—	—	—	—	—
Spencer Machacek		R	2008–2011	12	0	0	0	0	—	—	—	—	—
Derek MacKenzie		C	2001–2007	28	0	2	2	20	—	—	—	—	—
Ivan Majesky		D	2003–2004	63	3	7	10	76	—	—	—	—	—
Ben Maxwell		C	2010–2011	12	1	1	2	9	—	—	—	—	—
Chris McAlpine		D	1999–2000	3	0	0	0	2	—	—	—	—	—
Steve McCarthy		D	2005–2008	117	12	21	33	80	—	—	—	—	—
Shawn McEachern		L	2002–2004	128	27	54	81	104	—	—	—	—	—
Scott Mellanby		R	2005–2007	140	24	46	70	118	4	0	0	0	4
Glen Metropolit		C	2006–2007	57	12	16	28	20	—	—	—	—	—
Freddy Meyer		D	2010–2011	15	1	1	2	8	—	—	—	—	—
Freddy Modin		L	2010–2011	36	7	3	10	12	—	—	—	—	—
Jaroslav Modry		D	2005–2006	79	7	31	38	76	—	—	—	—	—
Joseph Motzko		R	2008–2009	6	1	0	1	0	—	—	—	—	—
Gordon Murphy		D	1999–2001	85	4	21	25	50	—	—	—	—	—
Ruman Ndur		D	1999–2000	27	1	0	1	71	—	—	—	—	—
Jeff Odgers		R	2000–2003	202	12	15	27	532	—	—	—	—	—
Johnny Oduya		D	2009–2011	109	3	23	26	34	—	—	—	—	—
Nathan Oystrick		D	2008–2009	53	4	8	12	50	—	—	—	—	—
Eric Perrin		C	2007–2009	159	19	49	68	62	—	—	—	—	—
Ronald Petrovicky		R	2003–2006	138	24	27	51	185	—	—	—	—	—
Rich Peverley		C	2008–2011	180	49	75	124	89	—	—	—	—	—
Kamil Piros		R	2001–2004	25	3	4	7	10	—	—	—	—	—
Mark Popovic		D	2005–2010	80	2	5	7	20	—	—	—	—	—
Paul Postma		D	2010–2011	1	0	0	0	0	—	—	—	—	—
Brian Pothier		D	2000–2002	36	3	6	9	24	—	—	—	—	—
Martin Prochazka		R	1999–2000	3	0	1	1	0	—	—	—	—	—
Marty Reasoner		C	2008–2010	159	18	29	47	60	—	—	—	—	—
Mark Recchi	2017	R	2007–2008	53	12	28	40	20	—	—	—	—	—
Todd Reirden		D	2001–2002	65	3	5	8	82	—	—	—	—	—
Pascal Rheaume		C	2001–2003	98	15	18	33	49	—	—	—	—	—
Patrick Rissmiller		L	2010–2011	1	0	0	0	0	—	—	—	—	—
Randy Robitaille		C	2003–2004	69	11	26	37	20	—	—	—	—	—
Kyle Rossiter		D	2003–2004	2	0	1	1	0	—	—	—	—	—
Steve Rucchin		C	2006–2007	47	5	16	21	14	—	—	—	—	—
Kirill Safronov		D	2001–2003	34	2	2	4	16	—	—	—	—	—
Anssi Salmela		D	2008–2010	38	2	6	8	24	—	—	—	—	—
Tommi Santala		C	2003–2004	33	1	2	3	22	—	—	—	—	—
Yves Sarault		L	2000–2001	20	5	4	9	26	—	—	—	—	—
Marc Savard		C	2002–2006	184	63	133	196	262	—	—	—	—	—
Mathieu Schneider		D	2008–2009	44	4	11	15	50	—	—	—	—	—
Rob Schremp		C	2010–2011	18	3	1	4	4	—	—	—	—	—
Christoph Schubert		D	2009–2010	47	2	5	7	69	—	—	—	—	—
Luke Sellars		D	2001–2002	1	0	0	0	2	—	—	—	—	—
Darryl Shannon		D	1999–2000	49	5	13	18	65	—	—	—	—	—
Jon Sim		L	2006–2007	77	17	12	29	60	4	0	0	0	0
Benjamin Simon		L	2001–2004	68	3	1	4	43	—	—	—	—	—
Jarrod Skalde		C	2000–2001	19	1	2	3	20	—	—	—	—	—
Andrei Skopintsev		D	2000–2001	17	1	3	4	16	—	—	—	—	—
Jim Slater		C	2005–2011	371	47	53	100	280	4	0	0	0	2
Jiri Slegr		D	2000–2002	71	6	21	27	87	—	—	—	—	—
Richard Smehlik		D	2002–2003	43	2	9	11	16	—	—	—	—	—
Daniel Snyder		C	2000–2003	49	11	5	16	64	—	—	—	—	—
Brent Sopel		D	2010–2011	59	2	5	7	16	—	—	—	—	—
Steve Staios		D	1999–2001	97	11	16	27	203	—	—	—	—	—
Mike Stapleton		C	1999–2000	62	10	12	22	30	—	—	—	—	—
Tim Stapleton		C	2009–2011	51	7	2	9	14	—	—	—	—	—
Patrik Stefan		C	1999–2006	414	59	118	177	148	—	—	—	—	—
Brett Sterling		L	2007–2009	19	2	2	4	16	—	—	—	—	—
Anthony Stewart		R	2010–2011	80	14	25	39	55	—	—	—	—	—
Karl Stewart		L	2003–2006	13	0	1	1	19	—	—	—	—	—
Colin Stuart		L	2007–2009	51	8	5	13	24	—	—	—	—	—
Mark Stuart		D	2010–2011	23	1	0	1	24	—	—	—	—	—
Andy Sutton		D	2001–2007	273	21	66	87	474	4	0	0	0	10
Per Svartvadet		C	1999–2003	247	17	34	51	58	—	—	—	—	—
Brian Swanson		C	2003–2004	2	0	1	1	0	—	—	—	—	—
Dean Sylvester		R	1999–2001	95	21	16	37	32	—	—	—	—	—
Chris Tamer		D	1999–2004	339	12	38	50	503	—	—	—	—	—
Brad Tapper		R	2000–2003	71	14	11	25	72	—	—	—	—	—
Chris Thorburn		R	2007–2011	313	25	40	65	362	—	—	—	—	—
Daniel Tjarnqvist		D	2001–2004	218	10	43	53	60	—	—	—	—	—
Keith Tkachuk		L	2006–2007	18	7	8	15	34	4	1	2	3	12
Yannick Tremblay		D	1999–2004	300	33	74	107	144	—	—	—	—	—
Boris Valabik		D	2007–2010	80	0	7	7	210	—	—	—	—	—
Herbert Vasiljevs		R	1999–2001	28	5	5	10	18	—	—	—	—	—
Jean-Pierre Vigier		R	2000–2007	213	23	23	46	97	—	—	—	—	—
Vitaly Vishnevski		D	2006–2007	52	3	9	12	31	—	—	—	—	—
Vladimir Vujtek		L	1999–2000	3	0	0	0	0	—	—	—	—	—
Sergei Vyshedkevich		D	1999–2001	30	2	5	7	16	—	—	—	—	—
Edward Ward		R	1999–2000	44	5	1	6	44	—	—	—	—	—
Mike Weaver		D	2001–2004	57	0	6	6	30	—	—	—	—	—
Noah Welch		D	2010–2011	2	0	0	0	0	—	—	—	—	—
Blake Wheeler		R	2011	23	7	10	17	14	—	—	—	—	—
Todd White		C	2007–2010	221	43	93	136	84	—	—	—	—	—
Jason Williams		C	2008–2009	41	7	11	18	8	—	—	—	—	—
Clay Wilson		D	2008–2009	2	0	0	0	0	—	—	—	—	—
Alexei Zhitnik		D	2006–2008	83	5	17	22	72	4	0	0	0	4
Andrey Zubarev		D	2010–2011	4	0	1	1	4	—	—	—	—	—

== Goaltenders ==
			Regular season								Playoffs						
Player	Team	Years	GP	W	L	T	OTL	SO	GAA	SV%	GP	W	L	OTL	SO	GAA	SV%
Adam Berkhoel		2005–2006	9	2	4	0	1	0	3.80	0.882	—	—	—	—	—	—	—
Frederic Cassivi		2001–2003	8	3	4	0	0	0	3.91	0.894	—	—	—	—	—	—	—
Byron Dafoe		2002–2004	35	9	22	2	0	0	3.73	0.881	—	—	—	—	—	—	—
Mike Dunham		2005–2006	17	8	5	0	2	1	2.77	0.893	—	—	—	—	—	—	—
Scott Fankhouser		1999–2002	23	4	12	2	0	0	3.31	0.894	—	—	—	—	—	—	—
Michael Garnett		2001–2006	24	10	7	0	4	2	3.44	0.885	—	—	—	—	—	—	—
Johan Hedberg		2006–2010	137	57	47	0	14	4	3.08	0.900	2	0	2	0	0	2.55	0.928
Milan Hnilicka		2000–2003	117	29	65	13	0	5	3.30	0.901	—	—	—	—	—	—	—
Scott Langkow		1999–2000	15	3	11	0	0	0	4.31	0.861	—	—	—	—	—	—	—
Kari Lehtonen		2003–2009	204	94	83	0	17	14	2.87	0.912	2	0	2	0	0	5.59	0.849
Peter Mannino		2010–2011	2	0	0	0	0	0	4.12	0.861	—	—	—	—	—	—	—
Norm Maracle		1999–2002	46	6	28	5	0	1	3.46	0.890	—	—	—	—	—	—	—
Chris Mason		2010–2011	33	13	13	0	3	1	3.39	0.892	—	—	—	—	—	—	—
Pasi Nurminen		2001–2004	125	48	54	12	0	5	2.87	0.904	—	—	—	—	—	—	—
Ondrej Pavelec		2007–2011	119	41	51	0	16	6	3.03	0.908	—	—	—	—	—	—	—
Damian Rhodes		1999–2002	81	14	48	11	0	1	3.60	0.889	—	—	—	—	—	—	—
Steve Shields		2005–2006	5	1	2	0	1	0	4.28	0.853	—	—	—	—	—	—	—
Richard Tabaracci		1999–2000	1	0	1	0	0	0	4.07	0.875	—	—	—	—	—	—	—

== See also ==
- List of Atlanta Flames players
- List of Winnipeg Jets players

== Notes ==
a: As of the 2005–2006 NHL season, all games have a winner; teams losing in overtime and shootouts are awarded one point thus the OTL stat replacees the tie statistic. The OTL column also includes SOL (Shootout losses).
