= List of NHL players (J) =

This is a list of National Hockey League (NHL) players who have played at least one game in the NHL from 1917 to present and have a last name that starts with "J".

List updated as of the 2018–19 NHL season.

== Ja ==
- Pat Jablonski
- Greg Jacina
- Barret Jackman
- Ric Jackman
- Tim Jackman
- Art Jackson
- Dane Jackson
- Don Jackson
- Doug Jackson
- Harold Jackson
- Harvey "Busher" Jackson
- Jack Jackson
- Jeff Jackson
- Jim Jackson
- Lloyd Jackson
- Percy Jackson
- Scott Jackson
- Stan Jackson
- Walter "Red" Jackson
- Josh Jacobs
- Paul Jacobs
- Tim Jacobs
- Jean-Francois Jacques
- Jason Jaffray
- Jaromir Jagr
- John Jakopin
- Pauli Jaks
- Risto Jalo
- Kari Jalonen
- Connor James
- Gerry James
- Val James
- James Jamieson
- Steve Janaszak
- Dan Jancevski
- Bob Janecyk
- Doug Janik
- Lou Jankowski
- Mark Jankowski
- Mattias Janmark-Nylen
- Craig Janney
- Cam Janssen
- Mark Janssens
- Marko Jantunen
- Ryan Jardine
- Calle Jarnkrok
- Christian Jaros
- Cole Jarrett
- Doug Jarrett
- Gary Jarrett
- Pierre Jarry
- Tristan Jarry
- Hannu Jarvenpaa
- Martti Jarventie
- Roby Jarventie
- Iiro Jarvi
- Doug Jarvis
- James "Bud" Jarvis
- Seth Jarvis
- Wes Jarvis
- Dmitrij Jaskin
- Jason Jaspers
- Arto Javanainen
- Bob Jay

== Je–Ji ==
- Tanner Jeannot
- Larry Jeffrey
- Tomas Jelinek
- Dean Jenkins
- Roger Jenkins
- Boone Jenner
- Bill Jennings
- Grant Jennings
- Al Jensen
- Chris Jensen
- Darren Jensen
- David Jensen (born 1961)
- David Jensen (born 1965)
- Joe Jensen
- Nick Jensen
- Nicklas Jensen
- Steve Jensen
- Jakub Jerabek
- Eddie Jeremiah
- Paul Jerrard
- Frank Jerwa
- Joe Jerwa
- Jeff Jillson
- David Jiricek
- Jaroslav Jirik

== Jo ==
- Rosario Joannette
- Rick Jodzio
- Jesse Joensuu
- Glenn Johannesen
- John Johannson
- Bill Johansen
- Lucas Johansen
- Ryan Johansen
- Trevor Johansen
- Andreas Johansson
- Bjorn Johansson
- Calle Johansson
- Jonas Johansson (born 1984)
- Jonas Johansson (born 1995)
- Magnus Johansson
- Mathias Johansson
- Roger Johansson
- Don Johns
- Stephen Johns
- Aaron Johnson
- Adam Johnson
- Al Johnson
- Bob Johnson
- Brent Johnson
- Brian Johnson
- Chad Johnson
- Craig Johnson
- Danny Johnson
- Earl Johnson
- Erik Johnson
- Greg Johnson
- Ivan "Ching" Johnson
- Jim Johnson (born 1942)
- Jim Johnson (born 1962)
- Justin Johnson
- Kent Johnson
- Luke Johnson
- Mark Johnson
- Matt Johnson
- Mike Johnson
- Norm Johnson
- Reese Johnson
- Ryan Johnson (born 1976)
- Ryan Johnson (born 2001)
- Terry Johnson
- Tom Johnson
- Tyler Johnson
- Virgil Johnson
- Andreas Johnsson
- Kim Johnsson
- Bernie Johnston
- Eddie Johnston
- George "Wingy" Johnston
- Greg Johnston
- Jay Johnston
- Joey Johnston
- Larry Johnston
- Marshall Johnston
- Randy Johnston
- Ross Johnston
- Ryan Johnston
- Wyatt Johnston
- Ed Johnstone
- Marc Johnstone
- Ross Johnstone
- Mikko Jokela
- Henri Jokiharju
- Jussi Jokinen
- Olli Jokinen
- Jyrki Jokipakka
- Aurel Joliat
- Bobby Joliat
- Greg Joly
- Yvan Joly
- Jean-Francois Jomphe
- Stan Jonathan
- Alvin "Buck" Jones
- Ben Jones
- Bob Jones
- Brad Jones
- Caleb Jones
- Connor Jones
- Jim Jones
- Jimmy Jones
- Keith Jones
- Martin Jones
- Matt Jones
- Max Jones
- Randy Jones
- Ron Jones
- Ryan Jones
- Ty Jones
- Hans Jonsson
- Jorgen Jonsson
- Kenny Jonsson
- Lars Jonsson
- Tomas Jonsson
- Axel Jonsson-Fjallby
- Michal Jordan
- Jacob Josefson
- Chris Joseph
- Curtis Joseph
- Mathieu Joseph
- Pierre-Olivier Joseph
- Tony Joseph
- Dakota Joshua
- Roman Josi
- Derek Joslin
- Tyson Jost
- Andrew Joudrey
- Ed Jovanovski
- Eddie Joyal
- Bob Joyce
- Duane Joyce

== Ju ==
- Bing Juckes
- Patrik Juhlin
- Claude Julien
- Joe Juneau
- Steve Junker
- Joe Junkin
- Jonas Junland
- Olli Juolevi
- Milan Jurcina
- Timo Jutila
- Noah Juulsen
- Bill Juzda

== See also ==
- hockeydb.com NHL Player List - J
