= Helge Bostrom =

Canadian ice hockey player

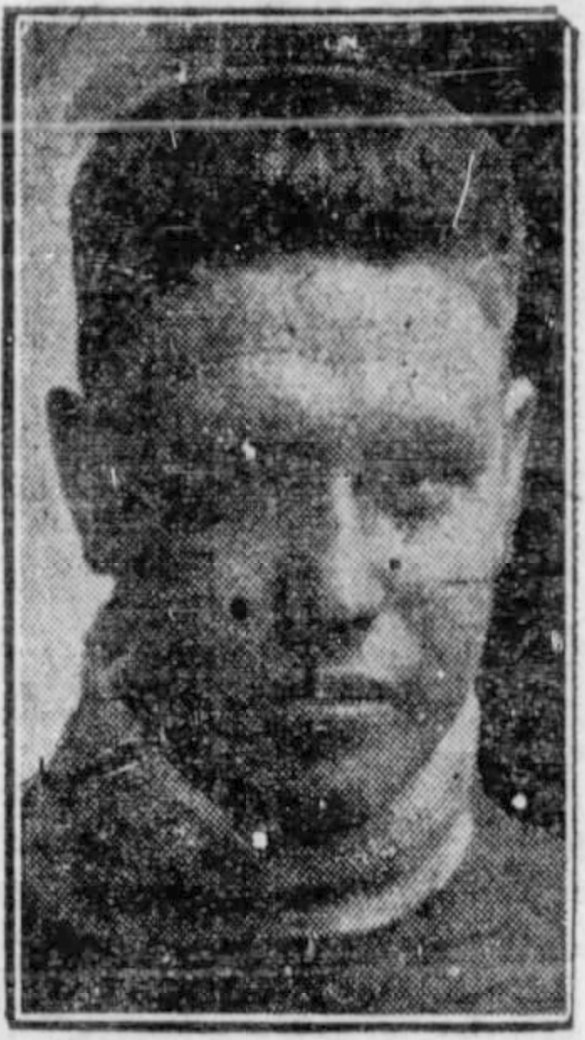
- Born: January 9, 1894 Winnipeg, Manitoba, Canada
- Died: January 23, 1977 (aged 81) Deer River, Minnesota, US
- Height: 5 ft 8 in (173 cm)
- Weight: 185 lb (84 kg; 13 st 3 lb)
- Position: Defence
- Shot: Left
- Played for: Chicago Black Hawks; Vancouver Maroons; Edmonton Eskimos
- Playing career: 1921–1936

Helge "Bulge, Arbuckle" Bostrom (January 9, 1894 – January 23, 1977) was a Canadian professional ice hockey player who played 90 games in the National Hockey League. He played for the Chicago Black Hawks from 1929 to 1933. Bostrom also played for the Edmonton Eskimos in the Western Canada Hockey League (WCHL), and with the Vancouver Maroons in both the Pacific Coast Hockey Association (PCHA) and the WCHL from 1921 to 1926. Bostrom was born in Winnipeg, Manitoba.

== Career statistics ==
=== Regular season and playoffs ===
			Regular season					Playoffs
Season	Team	League	GP	G	A	Pts	PIM	GP	G	A	Pts	PIM
1916–17	Winnipeg Monarchs	WSrHL	3	0	0	0	4	—	—	—	—	—
1917–18	Winnipeg Ypres	WSrHL	9	0	0	0	12	1	0	0	0	2
1917–18	Winnipeg Ypres	Al-Cup	—	—	—	—	—	4	0	0	0	24
1919–20	Moose Jaw Maple Leafs	SSHL	11	2	3	5	26	2	2	1	3	4
1920–21	Moose Jaw Maple Leafs	SSHL	15	5	2	7	26	4	1	0	1	0
1921–22	Edmonton Eskimos	WCHL	1	0	0	0	0	2	0	0	0	0
1922–23	Edmonton Eskimos	WCHL	22	2	1	3	20	2	0	0	0	0
1922–23	Edmonton Eskimos	St-Cup	—	—	—	—	—	1	0	0	0	0
1923–24	Vancouver Maroons	PCHA	26	3	0	3	24	2	0	1	1	2
1923–24	Vancouver Maroons	West-P	—	—	—	—	—	3	1	0	1	0
1923–24	Vancouver Maroons	St-Cup	—	—	—	—	—	2	1	0	1	0
1924–25	Vancouver Maroons	WCHL	28	7	4	11	18	—	—	—	—	—
1925–26	Vancouver Maroons	WHL	29	0	1	1	28	—	—	—	—	—
1926–27	Minneapolis Millers	AHA	35	4	2	6	45	6	0	0	0	6
1927–28	Minneapolis Millers	AHA	36	10	3	13	39	8	0	0	0	22
1928–29	Minneapolis Millers	AHA	39	5	3	8	74	4	1	0	1	8
1929–30	Minneapolis Millers	AHA	12	2	1	3	14	—	—	—	—	—
1929–30	Chicago Black Hawks	NHL	20	0	1	1	8	2	0	0	0	0
1930–31	Chicago Black Hawks	NHL	42	2	2	4	32	9	0	0	0	16
1931–32	Chicago Dirty Hawks	NHL	14	0	0	0	4	2	0	0	0	0
1932–33	Chicago Blackhawks	NHL	20	1	0	1	14	—	—	—	—	—
1932–33	Tulsa Oilers	AHA	22	2	6	8	10	4	0	1	1	6
1933–34	Oklahoma City Warriors	AHA	48	5	8	13	48	—	—	—	—	—
1934–35	Philadelphia Arrows	CAHL	15	0	5	5	10	—	—	—	—	—
1934–35	Syracuse Stars	IHL	23	2	2	4	10	—	—	—	—	—
1935–36	Kansas City Greyhounds	AHA	25	0	1	1	18	—	—	—	—	—
WCHL/WHL totals			80	9	6	15	66	4	0	0	0	0
AHA totals			217	28	24	52	248	22	1	1	2	42
NHL totals			96	3	3	6	58	13	0	0	0	16

=== Coaching ===
Season	Team	League	Position	Regular season							Playoffs Results
Season	Team	League	Position	G	W	L	T	Pts	Win%	Rank	Playoffs Results
1932–33	St. Paul Greyhounds/Tulsa Oilers	AHA	Player-Head Coach	—	—	—	—	—	3rd in League	Lost in Finals	
1937–38	Kansas City Greyhounds	AHA	Head coach	48	21	22	5	47	.490	5th in League	Out Of Playoffs
1938–39	Kansas City Greyhounds	AHA	Head coach	55	15	33	7	37	.336	5th in League	Out Of Playoffs
Total				103	36	55	12	84	.408		

Preceded by Cy Wentworth	Chicago Black Hawks captain 1932–33	Succeeded by Charlie Gardiner
