= Joe Thorsteinson =

Canadian ice hockey player (1905–1948)

- Born: March 19, 1905 Selkirk, Manitoba, Canada
- Died: August 24, 1948 (aged 43)
- Height: 5 ft 9 in (175 cm)
- Weight: 175 lb (79 kg; 12 st 7 lb)
- Position: Right wing
- Shot: Right
- Played for: New York Americans
- Playing career: 1922–1935

Johann Magnus Thorsteinson (March 19, 1905 – August 24, 1948) was a Canadian professional ice hockey right winger who played 4 games in the National Hockey League for the New York Americans during the 1932–33 season. The rest of his career, which lasted from 1922 to 1935, was spent in various minor leagues.

== Career statistics ==
=== Regular season and playoffs ===
| | | | Regular season | | | | | Playoffs |
| Season | Team | League | GP | G | A | Pts | PIM | GP | G | A | Pts | PIM |
|---|---|---|---|---|---|---|---|---|---|---|---|---|
| 1921–22 | Selkirk Jr. Fishermen | WDJHL | — | — | — | — | — | — | — | — | — | — |
| 1922–23 | Selkirk Fishermen | MHL | 14 | 3 | 7 | 10 | 10 | — | — | — | — | — |
| 1923–24 | Selkirk Fishermen | MHL | 2 | 0 | 1 | 1 | 0 | — | — | — | — | — |
| 1924–25 | Coleman Tigers | ASHL | — | — | — | — | — | — | — | — | — | — |
| 1925–26 | Winnipeg Maroons | CHL | 21 | 4 | 1 | 5 | 22 | 5 | 1 | 1 | 2 | 0 |
| 1926–27 | Winnipeg Maroons | AHA | 26 | 4 | 1 | 5 | 53 | 3 | 1 | 0 | 1 | 2 |
| 1926–27 | Moose Jaw Warriors | PHL | 16 | 3 | 0 | 3 | 4 | — | — | — | — | — |
| 1927–28 | Regina Capitals | PHL | 26 | 7 | 3 | 10 | 26 | — | — | — | — | — |
| 1928–29 | Duluth Hornets | AHA | 39 | 8 | 4 | 12 | 32 | — | — | — | — | — |
| 1929–30 | St. Paul Saints | AHA | 48 | 9 | 6 | 15 | 44 | — | — | — | — | — |
| 1930–31 | Buffalo Americans | AHA | 42 | 20 | 14 | 34 | 38 | — | — | — | — | — |
| 1931–32 | Buffalo Majors | AHA | 9 | 1 | 0 | 1 | 6 | — | — | — | — | — |
| 1931–32 | Duluth Hornets | AHA | 37 | 5 | 4 | 9 | 26 | 4 | 0 | 0 | 0 | 2 |
| 1932–33 | New York Americans | NHL | 4 | 0 | 0 | 0 | 0 | — | — | — | — | — |
| 1932–33 | Edmonton Eskimos | WCHL | 5 | 2 | 0 | 2 | 4 | — | — | — | — | — |
| 1932–33 | New Haven Eagles | Can-Am | 3 | 0 | 0 | 0 | 2 | — | — | — | — | — |
| 1933–34 | St. Louis Flyers | AHA | 14 | 0 | 0 | 0 | 2 | — | — | — | — | — |
| 1933–34 | Tulsa Oilers | AHA | 9 | 1 | 3 | 4 | 23 | — | — | — | — | — |
| 1933–34 | Wichita Vikings | AHA | 2 | 2 | 1 | 3 | 4 | — | — | — | — | — |
| 1934–35 | Minneapolis Millers | CHL | 28 | 2 | 5 | 7 | 21 | 5 | 1 | 2 | 3 | 2 |
| AHA totals | | | 226 | 50 | 33 | 83 | 228 | 7 | 1 | 0 | 1 | 4 |
| NHL totals | | | 4 | 0 | 0 | 0 | 0 | — | — | — | — | — |
