= Burr Williams =

American ice hockey player

- Born: August 30, 1908 Okemah, Oklahoma, U.S.
- Died: February 9, 1981 (aged 72) Duluth, Minnesota, U.S.
- Height: 5 ft 9 in (175 cm)
- Weight: 180 lb (82 kg; 12 st 12 lb)
- Position: Defense
- Shot: Right
- Played for: Detroit Red Wings; St. Louis Eagles; Boston Bruins
- Playing career: 1927–1941

Burton Williams (August 30, 1908 – February 9, 1981) was an American ice hockey defenseman who played three seasons in the National Hockey League (NHL) for the Detroit Red Wings, the St. Louis Eagles and the Boston Bruins between 1933 and 1935. He was born in Okemah, Oklahoma, but grew up in Duluth, Minnesota. The rest of his career, which lasted from 1927 to 1941, was spent in the minor league American Hockey Association, International Hockey League, and International American Hockey League. He died at a Duluth, Minnesota hospital in 1981.

== Career statistics ==
=== Regular season and playoffs ===
			Regular season					Playoffs
Season	Team	League	GP	G	A	Pts	PIM	GP	G	A	Pts	PIM
1927–28	Duluth Hornets	AHA	36	7	3	10	61	5	1	0	1	12
1928–29	Duluth Hornets	AHA	26	5	2	7	44	—	—	—	—	—
1929–30	Tulsa Oilers	AHA	48	9	7	16	77	9	2	2	4	21
1930–31	Tulsa Oilers	AHA	48	16	16	32	107	4	0	0	0	13
1931–32	Tulsa Oilers	AHA	8	1	2	3	14	—	—	—	—	—
1931–32	St. Louis Flyers	AHA	42	10	3	13	72	—	—	—	—	—
1932–33	Duluth Hornets	AHA	18	8	6	14	30	—	—	—	—	—
1932–33	Detroit Olympics	IHL	14	3	1	4	20	—	—	—	—	—
1933–34	Detroit Red Wings	NHL	1	0	1	1	12	7	0	0	0	8
1933–34	Detroit Olympics	IHL	35	5	4	9	50	—	—	—	—	—
1934–35	St. Louis Eagles	NHL	9	0	0	0	6	—	—	—	—	—
1934–35	Boston Bruins	NHL	7	0	0	0	6	—	—	—	—	—
1934–35	Detroit Olympics	IHL	31	7	8	15	52	5	0	0	0	8
1935–36	Detroit Olympics	IHL	47	7	9	16	53	6	1	1	2	14
1936–37	Detroit Red Wings	NHL	2	0	0	0	4	—	—	—	—	—
1936–37	Pittsburgh Hornets	IAHL	49	3	10	13	78	5	1	1	2	6
1937–38	New Haven Eagles	IAHL	2	0	0	0	0	—	—	—	—	—
1937–38	Pittsburgh Hornets	IAHL	3	0	0	0	2	—	—	—	—	—
1937–38	Tulsa Oilers	AHA	33	6	4	10	42	4	0	0	0	8
1938–39	Tulsa Oilers	AHA	48	5	8	13	71	8	0	2	2	20
1939–40	Tulsa Oilers	AHA	46	8	13	21	39	—	—	—	—	—
1940–41	St. Louis Flyers	AHA	7	0	0	0	12	—	—	—	—	—
1940–41	Kansas City Americans	AHA	4	0	0	0	0	—	—	—	—	—
1940–41	Omaha Knights	AHA	19	0	1	1	4	—	—	—	—	—
1940–41	Minneapolis Millers	AHA	10	4	2	6	4	—	—	—	—	—
AHA totals			393	79	67	146	577	30	3	4	7	74
NHL totals			19	0	1	1	28	7	0	0	0	8
