= Fern Headley =

American-born Canadian ice hockey player

- Born: March 2, 1900 Crystal, North Dakota, U.S.
- Died: September 28, 1956 (aged 56) Tulsa, Oklahoma, U.S.
- Height: 5 ft 11 in (180 cm)
- Weight: 175 lb (79 kg; 12 st 7 lb)
- Position: Defence
- Shot: Left
- Played for: Boston Bruins; Montreal Canadiens
- Playing career: 1922–1939

Fern James Headley (March 2, 1900 — September 28, 1956) was an American-born Canadian professional ice hockey defenseman who played 30 games in the National Hockey League for the Montreal Canadiens and Boston Bruins during the 1924–25 season. The rest of his career, which lasted from 1922 to 1939, was primarily spent in the American Hockey Association. He was born in Crystal, North Dakota, but grew up in Saskatoon, Saskatchewan. He scored one NHL goal. It occurred as a member of the Boston Bruins on December 17, 1924 in his team's 6-2 loss to the Montreal Maroons.

== Career statistics ==
=== Regular season and playoffs ===
			Regular season					Playoffs
Season	Team	League	GP	G	A	Pts	PIM	GP	G	A	Pts	PIM
1919–20	Saskatoon Quakers	N-SSHL	3	6	1	7	4	3	3	1	4	4
1919–20	Saskatoon Quakers	SJHL	—	—	—	—	—	3	6	1	7	4
1920–21	Saskatoon Collegiate	S-SSHL	4	6	2	8	—	5	4	0	4	6
1921–22	Saskatoon 5th Battalion	N-SSHL	9	7	2	9	2	—	—	—	—	—
1922–23	Saskatoon Sheiks	WCHL	20	2	0	2	4	—	—	—	—	—
1923–24	Saskatoon Crescents	WCHL	20	2	0	2	6	—	—	—	—	—
1924–25	Boston Bruins	NHL	13	1	2	3	4	—	—	—	—	—
1924–25	Montreal Canadiens	NHL	17	0	1	1	6	1	0	0	0	0
1924–25	Montreal Canadiens	St-Cup	—	—	—	—	—	4	0	0	0	0
1925–26	Calgary Tigers	WHL	29	2	1	3	47	—	—	—	—	—
1926–27	Calgary Tigers	PrHL	30	16	10	26	30	2	0	0	0	4
1927–28	Minneapolis Millers	AHA	37	6	5	11	37	8	0	0	0	0
1928–29	St. Louis Flyers	AHA	40	14	11	25	54	—	—	—	—	—
1929–30	St. Louis Flyers	AHA	48	5	6	11	47	—	—	—	—	—
1930–31	Chicago Shamrocks	AHA	47	5	8	13	44	—	—	—	—	—
1931–32	Chicago Shamrocks	AHA	47	6	5	11	50	4	0	0	0	5
1932–33	Duluth Hornets / Wichita Blue Jays	AHA	41	10	9	19	37	—	—	—	—	—
1933–34	Tulsa Oilers	AHA	32	6	2	8	34	4	0	0	0	4
1934–35	Tulsa Oilers	AHA	48	5	11	16	31	5	0	0	0	2
1935–36	Tulsa Oilers	AHA	43	1	4	5	33	3	0	0	0	4
1936–37	Kansas City Greyhounds	AHA	7	1	1	2	13	—	—	—	—	—
1936–37	Tulsa Oilers	AHA	18	0	0	0	6	—	—	—	—	—
1938–39	Wichita Skyhawks	AHA	33	6	7	13	36	—	—	—	—	—
AHA totals			441	65	69	134	422	24	0	0	0	15
NHL totals			30	1	3	4	10	1	0	0	0	0
