= Bobby Burns (ice hockey) =

Canadian ice hockey player

- Born: April 4, 1905; Gore Bay, Ontario, Canada
- Died: August 12, 1995 (aged 90)
- Height: 5 ft 10 in (178 cm)
- Weight: 155 lb (70 kg; 11 st 1 lb)
- Position: Left wing
- Shot: Left
- Played for: Chicago Black Hawks
- Playing career: 1925–1939

Robert Alexander Burns (April 4, 1905 – August 12, 1995) was a Canadian professional ice hockey left wing who played 19 games in the National Hockey League with the Chicago Black Hawks between 1928 and 1930. Burns spent most of his career, which lasted from 1925 to 1939, in the American Hockey Association (AHA).

== Playing career ==
Burns began his professional career in 1926 with Eddie Livingstone's Chicago Cardinals of the AHA. After the team was forced out of business by the NHL, the AHA assigned his rights to the Chicago Black Hawks. He played one game with the Hawks and the rest of the season for the Duluth Hornets. In 1928–29, he played in seven games for the Black Hawks. He was sent to the Minneapolis Millers the following season but would play in a further twelve games in the NHL for the Black Hawks, scoring his first and only NHL goal. He would play out the rest of his career in the AHA, retiring from pro hockey in 1939.

== Career statistics ==
=== Regular season and playoffs ===
			Regular season					Playoffs
Season	Team	League	GP	G	A	Pts	PIM	GP	G	A	Pts	PIM
1924–25	Owen Sound Greys	OHA	17	17	11	28	—	9	2	3	5	4
1925–26	Preston Riversides	OHA Sr	20	8	0	8	8	—	—	—	—	—
1926–27	Chicago Cardinals	AHA	33	6	3	9	20	—	—	—	—	—
1927–28	Duluth Hornets	AHA	39	9	1	10	38	5	0	0	0	6
1928–29	Chicago Black Hawks	NHL	7	0	0	0	0	—	—	—	—	—
1929–30	Chicago Black Hawks	NHL	12	1	0	1	2	—	—	—	—	—
1929–30	Minneapolis Millers	AHA	25	7	4	11	25	—	—	—	—	—
1930–31	Chicago Shamrocks	AHA	46	16	10	26	54	—	—	—	—	—
1931–32	Chicago Shamrocks	AHA	29	7	2	9	30	—	—	—	—	—
1931–32	St. Louis Flyers	AHA	13	3	0	3	12	—	—	—	—	—
1932–33	Kansas City Pla-Mors	AHA	27	11	4	15	28	—	—	—	—	—
1933–34	Oklahoma City Warriors	AHA	47	16	12	28	30	—	—	—	—	—
1934–35	Oklahoma City Warriors	AHA	48	17	19	36	35	—	—	—	—	—
1935–36	Oklahoma City Warriors	AHA	48	20	20	40	33	—	—	—	—	—
1936–37	St. Louis Flyers	AHA	46	25	19	44	34	6	4	3	7	9
1937–38	St. Louis Flyers	AHA	43	11	22	33	24	7	0	1	1	5
1938–39	St. Louis Flyers	AHA	45	15	23	38	46	7	2	3	5	2
AHA totals			489	163	139	302	409	25	6	7	13	22
NHL totals			19	1	0	1	2	—	—	—	—	—
