= Johnny McKinnon =

Canadian ice hockey player

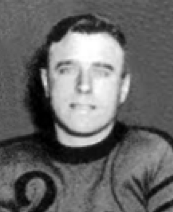
- Born: July 15, 1899 Guysborough, Nova Scotia, CAN
- Died: February 8, 1969 (aged 69) near Oak Park, Illinois, U.S.
- Height: 5 ft 8 in (173 cm)
- Weight: 170 lb (77 kg; 12 st 2 lb)
- Position: Defence
- Shot: Right
- Played for: NHL; Montreal Canadiens; Pittsburgh Pirates; Philadelphia Quakers; AHA; St. Louis Flyers; Kansas City Pla-Mors; Oklahoma City Warriors; CHL; Minneapolis Millers
- Playing career: 1925–1938

John Douglas McKinnon, Jr. (July 15, 1899 — February 8, 1969) was a Canadian professional ice hockey defenceman who played six seasons in the National Hockey League for the Montreal Canadiens, Pittsburgh Pirates, and Philadelphia Quakers between 1925 and 1931. He then spent eight seasons in the American Hockey Association, and retired in 1938. He was born in Guysborough, Nova Scotia.

== Career statistics ==
=== Regular season and playoffs ===
			Regular season					Playoffs
Season	Team	League	GP	G	A	Pts	PIM	GP	G	A	Pts	PIM
1923–24	Cleveland Indians	USAHA	10	0	0	0	—	—	—	—	—	—
1924–25	Fort Pitt Hornets	USAHA	23	24	0	24	—	8	2	0	2	—
1925–26	Montreal Canadiens	NHL	2	0	0	0	0	—	—	—	—	—
1925–26	Minneapolis Millers	CHL	32	12	8	20	44	3	3	1	4	6
1926–27	Pittsburgh Pirates	NHL	44	13	0	13	21	—	—	—	—	—
1927–28	Pittsburgh Pirates	NHL	43	3	3	6	71	2	0	0	0	4
1928–29	Pittsburgh Pirates	NHL	39	1	0	1	44	—	—	—	—	—
1929–30	Pittsburgh Pirates	NHL	41	10	7	17	42	—	—	—	—	—
1930–31	Philadelphia Quakers	NHL	39	1	1	2	46	—	—	—	—	—
1931–32	Kansas City Pla-Mors	AHA	48	16	4	20	65	3	0	0	0	2
1932–33	Kansas City Pla-Mors	AHA	32	7	4	11	32	4	0	0	0	2
1933–34	Oklahoma City Warriors	AHA	46	10	4	14	16	—	—	—	—	—
1934–35	Oklahoma City Warriors	AHA	43	3	4	7	15	—	—	—	—	—
1935–36	St. Louis Flyers	AHA	39	1	9	10	12	8	2	2	4	16
1936–37	St. Louis Flyers	AHA	47	5	9	14	16	6	1	0	1	2
1937–38	St. Louis Flyers	AHA	7	0	0	0	2	—	—	—	—	—
1938–39	St. Louis Flyers	AHA	—	—	—	—	—	—	—	—	—	—
NHL totals			208	28	11	39	224	2	0	0	0	4
