= Dick Carroll =

Canadian ice hockey coach (1885–1952)

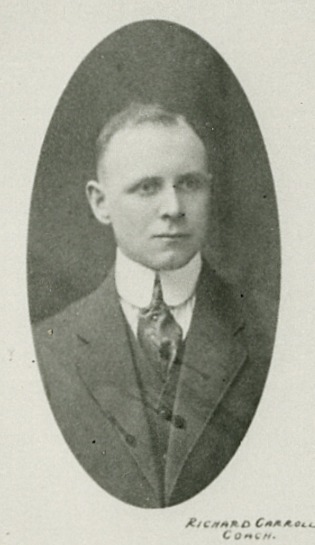
- Carroll in the 1917–18 season.
- Born: Richard Leo Carroll; April 28, 1885; Guelph, Ontario, Canada
- Died: January 20, 1952 (aged 66); Guelph, Ontario, Canada
- Occupation: Ice hockey coach
- Spouse: Myrtle Kilpatrick (m. 1913)

Richard Leo Carroll (April 28, 1885 – January 20, 1952) was a Canadian ice hockey coach. He led the Toronto team in the National Hockey League to the Stanley Cup championship in 1918 and the Toronto Canoe Club junior hockey team to the Memorial Cup win in 1920.

== Biography ==
From Guelph, Ontario, Carroll worked with the Toronto Blueshirts of the National Hockey Association. He won the Stanley Cup with his brother Frank as a trainer in 1914. In December, 1917 Richard was then asked by Charlie Querrie to be coach and assistant manager of the new Toronto NHL franchise. The team won the Stanley Cup in its first year, but even with largely the same lineup, struggled badly in 1918–19 (now under the name the Toronto Arenas), finishing with five wins and 13 losses. Carroll was replaced as coach after that season.

In 1919–20, Carroll coached the Toronto Dental Society senior team in the Ontario Hockey Association and the Toronto Canoe Club junior team that won the 1920 Memorial Cup. In 1920–21 and 1921–22, he coached the Toronto Aura Lee senior team.

Caroll then coached the Pittsburgh Yellow Jackets of the United States Amateur Hockey Association, leading them to two championships in 1924 and 1925. He then coached the Duluth Hornets of the American Hockey Association for two seasons (1926 to 1928) and the Tulsa Oilers for three seasons (1928 to 1931). Over his first five years as a coach in the AHA, Carroll's teams finished in first place four times. Staying in the AHA, Carroll coached the St. Louis Flyers (1931–32) and the Oklahoma City Warriors (1933–34), but both teams had losing records.

He was also a football and boxing coach, and was manager of the Guelph Maple Leafs baseball team of the Intercounty Baseball League, winning the league championship in 1928.

Caroll died in Guelph after being confined to hospital with a heart condition. He was 66 years old.

== Coaching record ==
=== National Hockey League ===
Team	Year	Regular season						Postseason
Team	Year	G	W	L	T	Pts	Division rank	Result
Toronto Hockey Club	1917-18	22	13	9	0	26	2nd in NHL	Won O'Brien Trophy (10-7 vs. MTL); Won Stanley Cup (3-2 vs. VAN)
Toronto Hockey Club	1918-19	18	5	13	0	10	3rd in NHL	Did not qualify
NHL totals		40	18	22	0	36		4-3 (0.571 - 1 Stanley Cup)

=== United States Amateur Hockey Association ===
Team	Year	Regular season						Postseason
Team	Year	G	W	L	T	Pts	Division rank	Result
Pittsburgh Yellow Jackets	1923-24	20	15	5	0	30	1st in Western	Finished 1st in division final round-robin (4-1-1); Won Fellowes Cup (4-1 vs. BOS)
Pittsburgh Yellow Jackets	1924-25	20	15	3	2	32	1st in Western	Won division final (4-0 vs. EVE); Won Fellowes Cup (4-0 vs. FP)
USAHA totals		40	30	8	2	62	2 division titles	16-2-1 (0.868 - 2 Fellowes Cups)

=== Central Amateur Hockey League ===
Team	Year	Regular season						Postseason
Team	Year	G	W	L	T	Pts	Division rank	Result
Duluth Hornets	1925-26	36	18	14	4	40	2nd in CAHL	Won league semi-finals (10-9 vs. WPG); Lost league final (0-3 vs. MIN)
CAHL totals		36	18	14	4	40		2-4-2 (0.429)

=== American Hockey Association ===
Team	Year	Regular season						Postseason
Team	Year	G	W	L	T	Pts	Division rank	Result
Duluth Hornets	1926-27	38	20	10	8	48	1st in AHA	Won Harry F. Sinclair Trophy (3-0 vs. MIN)
Duluth Hornets	1927-28	40	18	9	13	49	1st in AHA	Lost Harry F. Sinclair Trophy (0-1-4 vs. MIN)
Tulsa Oilers	1928-29	40	23	9	8	54	1st in AHA	Won Harry F. Sinclair Trophy (2-0-2 vs. STP)
Tulsa Oilers	1929-30	48	18	14	16	52	3rd in AHA	Won league semi-finals (2-1-1 vs. DUL; Lost Harry F. Sinclair Trophy (6-8 vs. KC)
Tulsa Oilers	1930-31	48	30	15	3	60	1st in AHA	Won Harry F. Sinclair Trophy (3-1 vs. KC)
St. Louis Flyers	1931-32	48	18	22	8	36	4th in AHA	Did not qualify
Oklahoma City Warriors	1933-34	48	16	30	2	32	4th in AHA	Did not qualify
AHA totals		310	143	109	58	331		12-5-8 (0.640 - 3 Harry F. Sinclair Trophies)

=== International Hockey League ===
Team	Year	Regular season						Postseason
Team	Year	G	W	L	T	Pts	Division rank	Result
Windsor Bulldogs	1935-36	48	18	19	11	47	3rd in Western	Won league quarter-finals (4-3 vs. LDN); Won league semi-finals (2-1 vs. BUF); Lost league finals (0-3 vs. DET)
IHL totals		48	18	19	11	47		3-4-1 (0.438)

Preceded by Position created	Head coach of the Toronto Arenas; 1917–19	Succeeded by Frank Heffernan
