= Fred Gordon =

Canadian ice hockey player

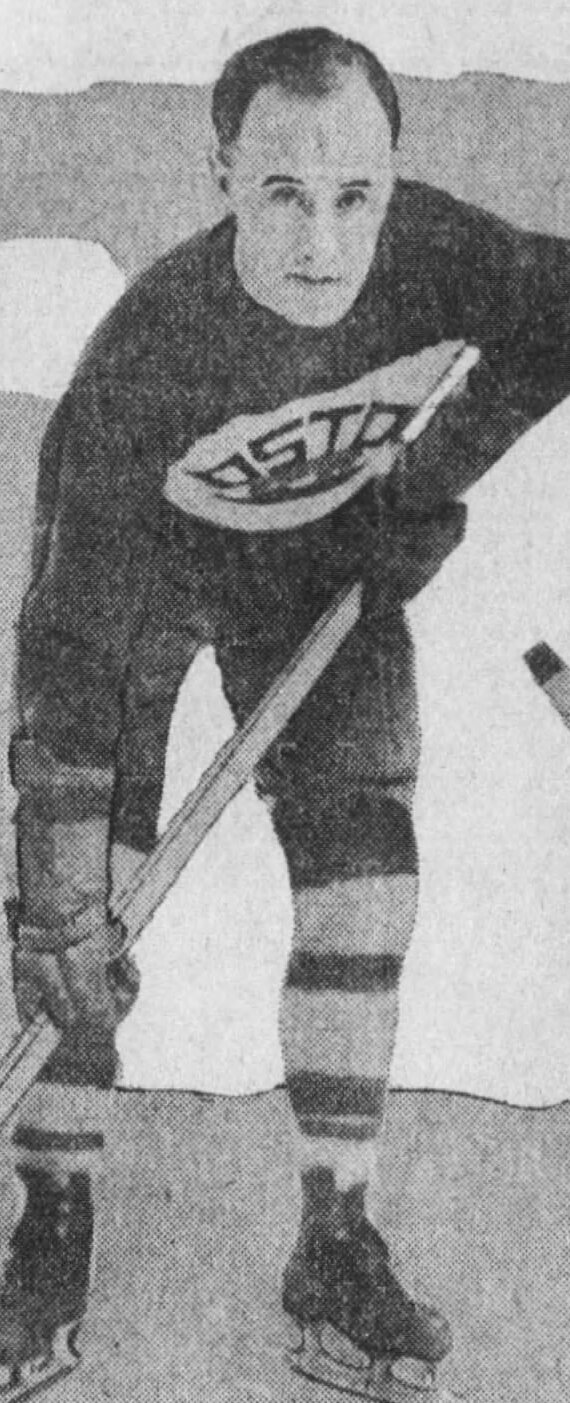
- Born: May 6, 1900; Fleming, Northwest Territories, Canada
- Died: November 26, 1985 (aged 85); Bentonville, Arkansas, U.S.
- Height: 5 ft 10 in (178 cm)
- Weight: 185 lb (84 kg; 13 st 3 lb)
- Position: Right wing
- Shot: Right
- Played for: Detroit Cougars; Boston Bruins
- Playing career: 1924–1939

Weldon Frederick Kenneth Gordon (May 6, 1900 — November 26, 1985) was a Canadian ice hockey right winger. He played in 80 National Hockey League games for the Detroit Cougars and the Boston Bruins. He later coached the Tulsa Oilers of the American Hockey Association.

== Professional career ==
=== Minor league hockey ===
Gordon starting play for the 1921–22 season with the Indian Head Tigers of the Regina City Senior League. He scored 12 goals in 9 games with the club and would return the following season. He continued his scoring pace and was moved to the Brandon Regals for the 1923–24 season. He scored 9 points that season and was noticed by the Saskatoon Shieks of the Western Canada Hockey League. He was signed to a contract and Gordon joined the Shieks for the 1924–25 and 1925–26 seasons. He did not produce as much as the management would have liked and was traded on October 27, 1926 to the Detroit Cougars.

=== Playing in the NHL ===
Gordon scored five goals as an NHL rookie in 1926–27 to go along with five assists while playing on a line with Duke Keats and Johnny Sheppard. Gordon proved he was an effective role player and was traded after his rookie season to the Boston Bruins for Harry Meeking on May 22, 1927. Gordon scored five points and 40 penalty minutes for Boston in 1927–28 and even helped them reach the playoffs, eventually falling to the New York Rangers in the semi-final.

=== Joining the AHA ===
After his season with Boston, Gordon did not return to the NHL and decided to join the Minneapolis Millers of the American Hockey Association. He spent three seasons as a Miller, scoring 38 points and racking up 133 PIMs. He was traded to the Buffalo Majors for the 1931–32 season and continued his status as an enforcer, scoring five goals and putting up 26 PIMs. His old team, the Saskatoon Shieks, now renamed the Saskatoon Crescents, decided to sign him as a free agent on November 8, 1932. However, he suited up for only three games in the 1932–33 season before suffering a season-ending injury. Gordon was let go after his year-long contract was up and he returned to the AHA, joining the first-place Kansas City Greyhounds. He had his most productive season to date in 1933–34, scoring 22 points and putting up 52 PIMs. Gordon led the Greyhounds into the playoffs and won the Harry F. Sinclair Trophy as league Champions. He would play one more season with the Greyhounds before retiring from playing ice hockey after the 1934–35 season.

=== Coaching ===
After taking a year off as an amateur referee, Gordon was asked to step in and coach the Tulsa Oilers. He agreed and was put into place towards the end of the Oilers' losing season. He was given full control for the 1937–38 season and coached the Oilers to a winning season with a record of 22–21–5. The following season saw the Oilers finishing with a 25–23–2 record, and saw Gordon hit the ice to come out of retirement. He skated in one game in which he scored an assist and four PIMs. The 1939–40 season would be his last as head coach when he led the Oilers to a 16–30–0 season, their worst season in years. Gordon decided to retire from coaching ice hockey in 1940.

== Career statistics ==
=== Regular season and playoffs ===
			Regular season					Playoffs
Season	Team	League	GP	G	A	Pts	PIM	GP	G	A	Pts	PIM
1921–22	Indian Head Tigers	S-SSHL	8	10	0	10	8	1	2	0	2	0
1922–23	Indian Head Tigers	S-SSHL	—	—	—	—	—	—	—	—	—	—
1922–23	Brandon Wheat City	MHA	16	5	3	8	7	—	—	—	—	—
1923–24	Brandon Regals	S-SSHL	12	4	5	9	5	2	0	0	0	2
1924–25	Saskatoon Crescents	WCHL	19	2	2	4	11	2	1	0	1	2
1925–26	Saskatoon Crescents	WHL	30	9	2	11	36	2	0	0	0	2
1926–27	Detroit Cougars	NHL	38	5	5	10	28	—	—	—	—	—
1927–28	Boston Bruins	NHL	43	3	2	5	40	2	0	0	0	0
1928–29	Minneapolis Millers	AHA	39	4	3	7	47	4	0	0	0	8
1929–30	Minneapolis Millers	AHA	40	4	7	11	102	—	—	—	—	—
1930–31	Minneapolis Millers	AHA	43	10	9	19	81	—	—	—	—	—
1931–32	Buffalo Majors	AHA	17	5	0	5	26	—	—	—	—	—
1932–33	Saskatoon Crescents	WCHL	3	0	0	0	0	—	—	—	—	—
1933–34	Kansas City Greyhounds	AHA	47	12	10	22	52	3	0	0	0	4
1934–35	Kansas City Greyhounds	AHA	21	1	2	3	16	—	—	—	—	—
1936–37	Tulsa Oilers	AHA	—	—	—	—	—	—	—	—	—	—
1938–39	Tulsa Oilers	AHA	1	0	1	1	0	—	—	—	—	—
AHA totals			208	36	32	68	328	7	0	0	0	12
NHL totals			81	8	7	15	68	2	0	0	0	0

== Awards and achievements ==
- Harry F. Sinclair Trophy winner: 1933–34 (Kansas City Greyhounds - AHA)
