= Ted Graham (ice hockey) =

Canadian ice hockey player

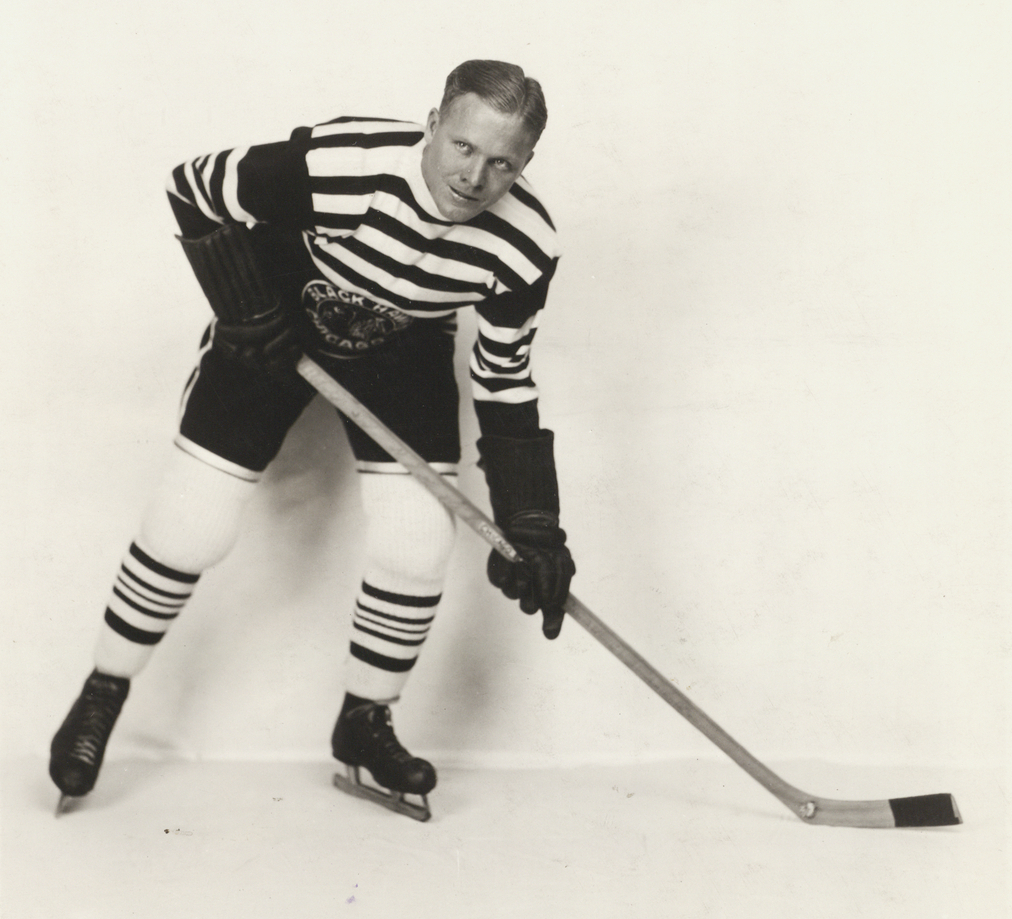
- Born: June 30, 1904 Owen Sound, Ontario, Canada
- Died: January 11, 1979 (aged 74)
- Height: 5 ft 8 in (173 cm)
- Weight: 170 lb (77 kg; 12 st 2 lb)
- Position: Defence
- Shot: Left
- Played for: Chicago Black Hawks; Montreal Maroons; Detroit Red Wings; St. Louis Eagles; Boston Bruins; New York Americans
- Playing career: 1926–1938

William Edward Dixon Graham (June 30, 1904 in Owen Sound, Ontario – January 11, 1979) was a Canadian ice hockey defenceman. Dixon played ten seasons in the National Hockey League (NHL) for the Chicago Black Hawks, Montreal Maroons, Detroit Red Wings, St. Louis Eagles, Boston Bruins and New York Americans between 1927 and 1937. Prior to turning professional Graham played for the Owen Sound Greys, winning the 1924 Memorial Cup as Canadian junior champions.

== Playing career ==
As a junior player Graham played for the Owen Sound Greys, helping them win the 1924 Memorial Cup as Canadian junior champions. He played two seasons of senior hockey before he turning professional in 1926, signing with the Chicago Cardinals of the American Hockey Association. He played for the team for one year, and after they folded Graham moved cross-town to the Chicago Black Hawks of the National Hockey League (NHL). Graham's NHL debut came on November 15, 1927, against the Boston Bruins, and his first goal, and only point of the season, was on January 4, 1928, against the Montreal Canadiens.

Partway through the season Graham was traded to the Moose Jaw Warriors of the Prairie Hockey League in January 1928, though Moose Jaw traded him the same day to the Saskatoon Sheiks, where Graham finished the 1927–28 season with. He then signed with the Tulsa Oilers of the AHA, and spent the 1928–29 and most of the 1929–30 seasons there before being traded back to the Black Hawks. Graham remained with Chicago until 1933 when he was traded to the Montreal Maroons, where he played 19 games before being traded in January 1934 to the Detroit Red Wings. With the Red Wings he played 52 games over two seasons, as well as 7 games for their International Hockey League affiliate, the Detroit Olympics, before being traded again, this time to the St. Louis Eagles, where he played the last 13 games of the 1934–35 season.

The Eagles folded after the season and the players were dispersed to the other NHL teams, with Graham being selected by the Boston Bruins. He would play the 1935–36 season and the first game of the 1936–37 season with the Bruins, scoring four goals and one assist in 49 games, before being traded to the New York Americans, where he finished the 1936–37 season with, playing 31 games. Graham played a further season in the International American Hockey League before retiring in 1938. Graham subsequently became an ice hockey referee.

Graham played in two Stanley Cup Finals during his career. The first was in 1931 with Chicago, who lost to the Montreal Canadiens. He reached the Final again in 1934 with Detroit, joined by former Owen Sound teammate Cooney Weiland, but lost to the Black Hawks.

== Career statistics ==
=== Regular season and playoffs ===
			Regular season					Playoffs
Season	Team	League	GP	G	A	Pts	PIM	GP	G	A	Pts	PIM
1923–24	Owen Sound Greys	Exhib	11	3	7	10	—	—	—	—	—	—
1923–24	Owen Sound Greys	Mem-Cup	—	—	—	—	—	15	7	4	11	—
1924–25	Stratford Indians	OHA Sr	20	3	2	5	22	—	—	—	—	—
1925–26	London Ravens	OHA Sr	20	4	3	7	6	4	0	1	1	2
1926–27	Chicago Cardinals	AHA	32	1	1	2	23	—	—	—	—	—
1927–28	Chicago Black Hawks	NHL	19	1	0	1	8	—	—	—	—	—
1927–28	Saskatoon Sheiks	PHL	12	3	5	8	7	—	—	—	—	—
1928–29	Tulsa Oilers	AHA	34	10	15	25	38	4	1	0	1	4
1929–30	Tulsa Oilers	AHA	15	4	0	4	12	—	—	—	—	—
1929–30	Chicago Black Hawks	NHL	26	1	2	3	23	2	0	0	0	8
1930–31	Chicago Black Hawks	NHL	42	0	7	7	38	9	0	0	0	12
1931–32	Chicago Black Hawks	NHL	48	0	3	3	40	2	0	0	0	2
1932–33	Chicago Black Hawks	NHL	47	3	8	11	57	—	—	—	—	—
1933–34	Montreal Maroons	NHL	19	2	1	3	10	—	—	—	—	—
1933–34	Detroit Red Wings	NHL	28	1	0	1	29	9	3	1	4	8
1934–35	Detroit Red Wings	NHL	24	0	2	2	26	—	—	—	—	—
1934–35	Detroit Olympics	IHL	7	0	0	0	10	—	—	—	—	—
1934–35	St. Louis Eagles	NHL	13	0	0	0	2	—	—	—	—	—
1935–36	Boston Bruins	NHL	48	4	1	5	37	2	0	0	0	0
1936–37	Boston Bruins	NHL	1	0	0	0	0	—	—	—	—	—
1936–37	New York Americans	NHL	31	2	1	3	30	—	—	—	—	—
1936–37	Providence Reds	IAHL	9	0	0	0	2	—	—	—	—	—
1937–38	New Haven Eagles	IAHL	29	0	2	2	14	2	0	0	0	0
NHL totals			346	14	25	39	300	24	3	1	4	30

== Bibliography ==
- History – Champion Rosters, Canadian Hockey League, 2020
- Coleman, Charles L. (1964), The Trail of the Stanley Cup, Volume 1: 1893–1926 inc., Dubuque, Iowa: Kendall/Hunt Publishing, ISBN 0-8403-2941-5
- Diamond, Dan, ed. (2002), Total Hockey: The Official Encyclopedia of the National Hockey League, Second Edition, New York: Total Sports Publishing, ISBN 1-892129-85-X
- Kitchen, Paul (2008), Win, Tie, or Wrangle: The Inside Story of the Old Ottawa Senators, 1883–1935, Manotic, Ontario: Penumbra Press, ISBN 978-1-897323-46-5
- Ted Graham Game Logs 1927–28, National Hockey League, 2020
