= Charlie Langlois =

Canadian ice hockey player

- Born: August 24, 1894 Lotbinière, Quebec, Canada
- Died: August 31, 1965 (aged 71) Sudbury, Ontario, Canada
- Height: 6 ft 0 in (183 cm)
- Weight: 210 lb (95 kg; 15 st 0 lb)
- Position: Right Wing/Defence
- Shot: Right
- Played for: Pittsburgh Pirates; New York Americans; Hamilton Tigers; Montreal Canadiens
- Playing career: 1924–1932

Joseph Louis Alphonse Charles Langlois (August 24, 1894 – August 31, 1965) was a Canadian hockey forward who played four seasons in the National Hockey League for the Hamilton Tigers, New York Americans, Pittsburgh Pirates and Montreal Canadiens. He also spent several years playing in various minor leagues, and retired in 1932. He was born in Lotbinière, Quebec.

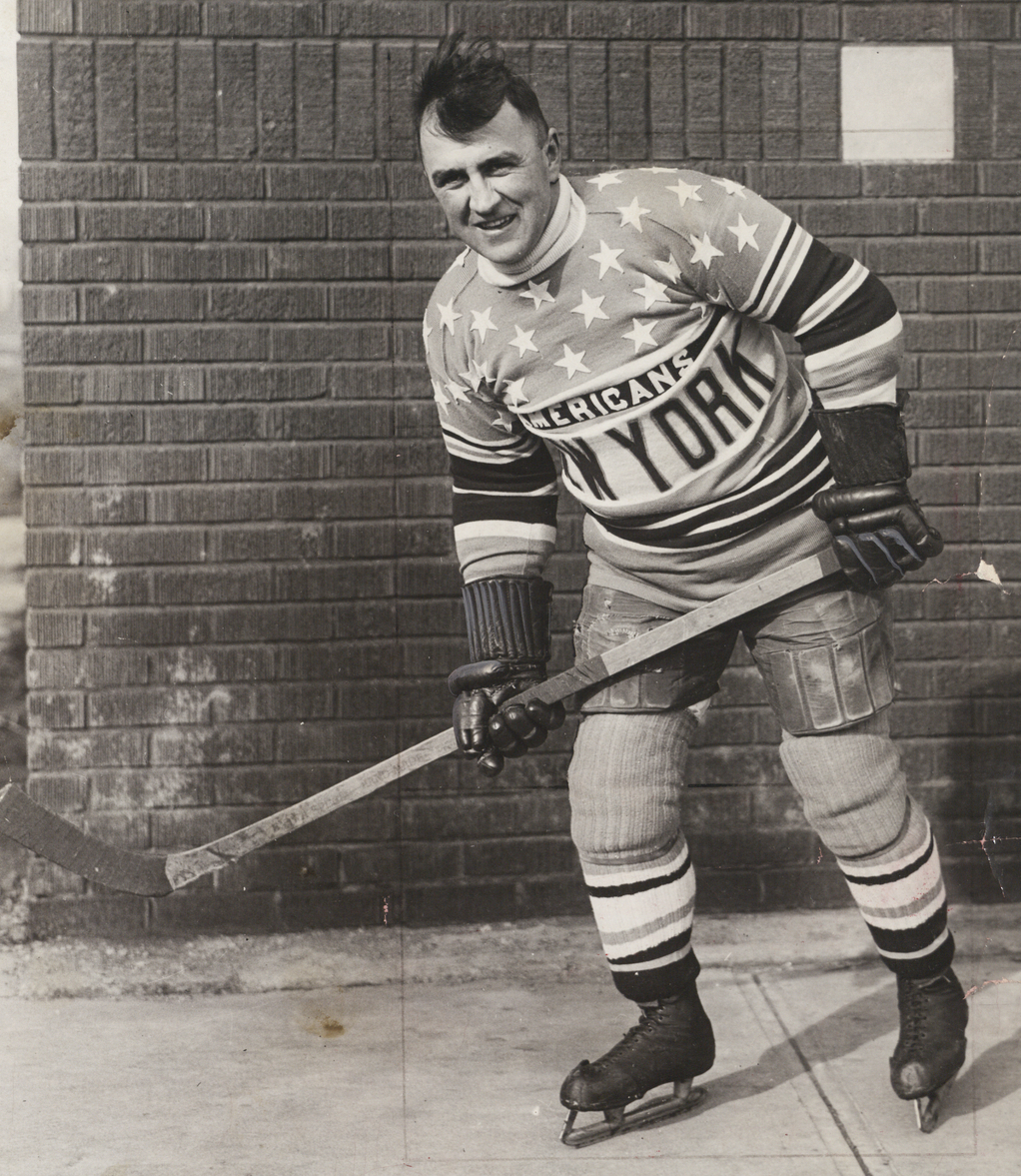
Charlie "Joseph Louis Alphonse Charles" Langlois, c. 1927

== Career statistics ==
=== Regular season and playoffs ===
			Regular season					Playoffs
Season	Team	League	GP	G	A	Pts	PIM	GP	G	A	Pts	PIM
1916–17	Montreal Stars	MCHL	10	2	5	7	24	4	3	2	5	15
1916–17	Montreal Lyalls	MCHL	11	8	0	8	—	—	—	—	—	—
1917–18	Montreal Lyalls	MCHL	11	10	7	17	24	1	1	0	1	0
1918–19	Montreal Nationale	MCHL	3	5	3	8	3	—	—	—	—	—
1918–19	Montreal Vickers	MCHL	6	4	0	4	—	—	—	—	—	—
1919–20	Sudbury Wolves	NOHA	6	5	2	7	2	7	6	4	10	12
1920–21	Sudbury Wolves	NOHA	9	8	5	13	61	—	—	—	—	—
1921–22	Sudbury Wolves	NOHA	8	1	2	3	21	—	—	—	—	—
1922–23	Sudbury Wolves	NOHA	7	1	1	2	6	2	0	0	0	0
1923–24	Sudbury Wolves	NOHA	—	—	—	—	—	—	—	—	—	—
1924–25	Hamilton Tigers	NHL	30	6	3	9	47	—	—	—	—	—
1925–26	New York Americans	NHL	36	9	1	10	76	—	—	—	—	—
1926–27	New York Americans	NHL	9	2	0	2	8	—	—	—	—	—
1926–27	Pittsburgh Pirates	NHL	36	5	1	6	36	—	—	—	—	—
1927–28	Pittsburgh Pirates	NHL	8	0	0	0	8	—	—	—	—	—
1927–28	Montreal Canadiens	NHL	32	0	0	0	14	2	0	0	0	0
1928–29	Providence Reds	Can-Am	37	3	0	3	26	5	0	0	0	24
1929–30	Duluth Hornets	AHA	46	7	1	8	87	4	0	0	0	0
1930–31	Duluth Hornets	AHA	47	2	6	8	64	4	0	0	0	6
1931–32	Tulsa Oilers	AHA	30	1	2	3	73	—	—	—	—	—
NHL totals			151	22	5	27	189	2	0	0	0	0
