= Shorty Green =

Ice hockey player (1896–1960)

- Hockey Hall of Fame, 1963
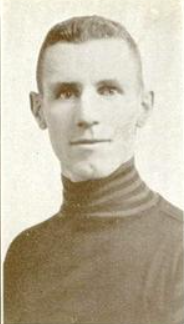
- Born: July 17, 1896 Sudbury, Ontario, Canada
- Died: April 19, 1960 (aged 63) Sudbury, Ontario, Canada
- Height: 5 ft 10 in (178 cm)
- Weight: 152 lb (69 kg; 10 st 12 lb)
- Position: Right wing
- Shot: Right
- Played for: Hamilton Tigers; New York Americans
- Playing career: 1923–1927

Wilfred Thomas "Shorty" Green (July 17, 1896 – April 19, 1960) was a Canadian professional ice hockey forward who played four seasons in the National Hockey League (NHL) for the Hamilton Tigers and New York Americans between 1923 and 1927. As captain of the Tigers in 1925, he led the team on a strike with the demand that the players be paid an additional C$200 to participate in the playoffs. The league refused, suspended the team and sold the organization to New York interests. As a member of the Americans, Green scored the first goal in Madison Square Garden history, and after two seasons as a player in New York, coached the team for one before coaching minor league teams for several years. He was inducted into the Hockey Hall of Fame in 1963.

His younger brother Red Green was also a hockey player in the NHL.

== Playing career ==
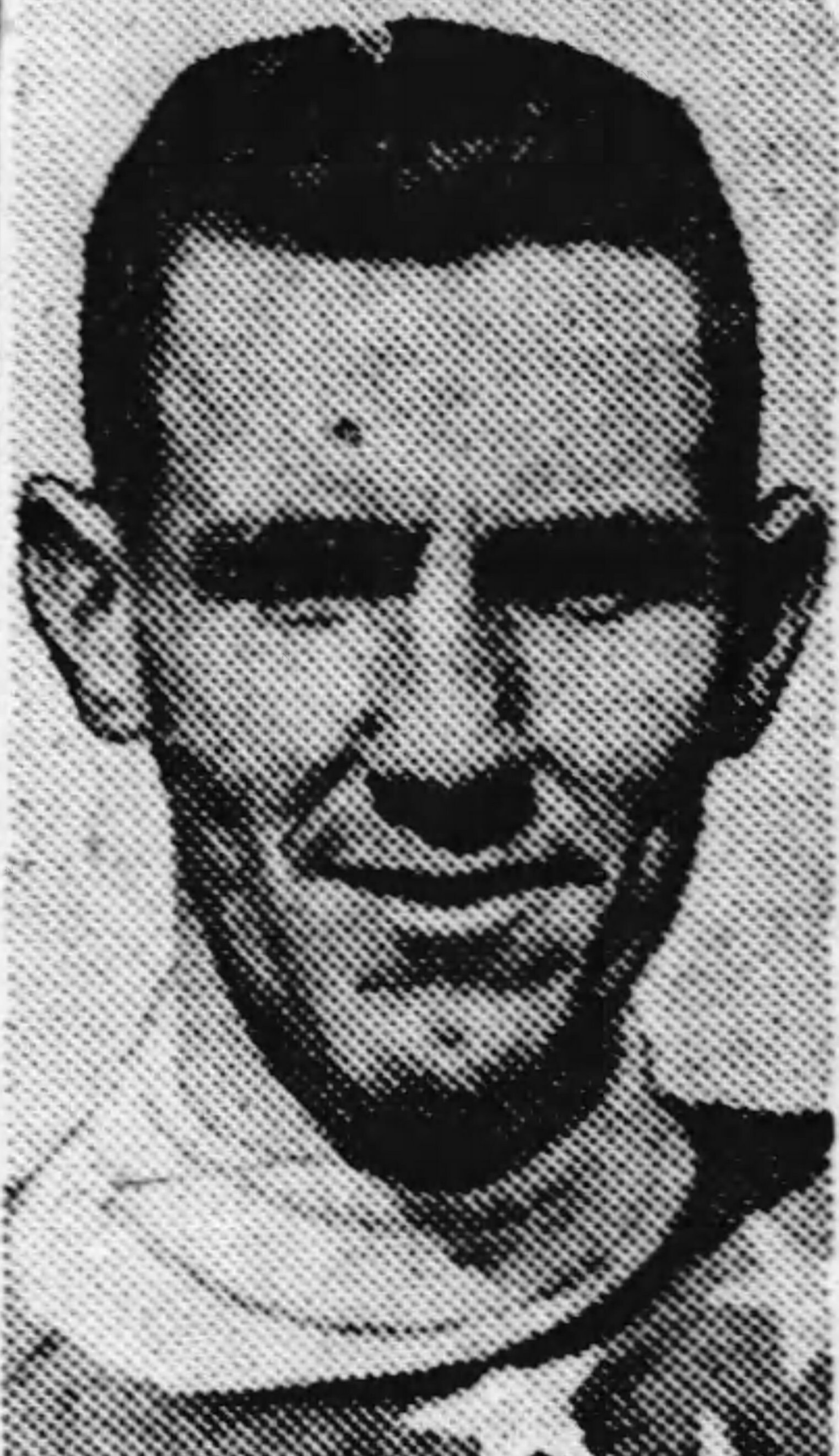
Green in 1927 for New York Americans

A native of Sudbury, Ontario, Green played senior hockey in his hometown and was a team member that won the Northern Ontario senior championship in 1915. He enlisted with the Canadian military on April 3, 1916, serving and playing with the 227th Battalion in the Ontario Hockey Association senior division in 1916–17. Deployed overseas in 1917, Green was reassigned to the 8th Reserve Battalion. On May 17, 1917 he was promoted to acting Lance Sergeant; however, this was reverted two days later as he wanted to go to the front, and being a private was the fastest way to do that. Green fought in the Battle of Passchendaele as a member of the Canadian Machine Gun Corps; on November 9, 1917, during the battle, he was a victim of a gas attack. He developed diphtheria and gastritis one month later and was hospitalized. He still had health issues in August 1918, and a physician noted he did "not look strong". Green was discharged and returned to Canada by December 1918.

Back in Canada Green returned to hockey. He joined the Hamilton Tigers senior team and led them to the 1919 Allan Cup championship before returning home to play four seasons with the Sudbury Wolves of the Northern Ontario Hockey Association. He moved back to Hamilton in 1923 and began his professional career. He played on a line with his brother, "Red" Green, and Billy Burch for the last place Tigers. Green was unanimously voted as team captain prior to the start of the 1924–25 NHL season and his skill and physical style in spite of his small stature made him a fan favourite. The Tigers flourished on the ice, finishing as the top team in the NHL, and qualifying for the playoffs for the first time in franchise history.

"[We] would rather play to a Hamilton audience than to any other on the circuit. We would be more than pleased to represent Hamilton again in the NHL for the benefit of the fans who have so generously patronized our games, but this is final. We do intend to ever play again for the present management."

— Green explains why the players went on strike in an open letter to the citizens of Hamilton

When the players learned that team owners were making large profits on the Tigers despite ownership's claims the team was "suffering" financially, Green and Burch led a player's strike against management, demanding a C$200 bonus each or the players would not participate in the playoffs. Team management refused while NHL president Frank Calder warned that if the players did not relent, he would suspend the team and award the fourth-place Ottawa Senators Hamilton's place in the NHL final. The players refused to give in, and as a result, Calder ultimately declared the Montreal Canadiens league champions after they defeated the Toronto St. Patricks in the semi-final and fined each player $200. It was the first player's strike in NHL history.

Additionally, the strike led to the demise of Hamilton's entry in the NHL as the team and players were sold and became the New York Americans for the 1925–26 season. Many of the players received significant raises following the transfer to New York, including Green who saw his salary rise from $3,000 per season to $5,000. On December 19, 1925, he scored the first goal in Madison Square Garden history before a crowd of 17,000 fans. Late in his second season with the Americans, Green suffered a dislocated kidney during a game and was sent to hospital in critical condition. He recovered, but the injury ended his playing career.

The Americans named Green their head coach for the 1927–28 NHL season, and finished the season outside of the playoffs with a record of 11–27–6. He left the NHL to coach the Duluth Hornets of the American Hockey Association for three seasons between 1928 and 1931, appearing in three games, and with the Tulsa Oilers in 1931–32.

He coached the Hamilton Tigers' senior team for one season in 1932–33 before returning to Sudbury where he first opened a men's clothing store and in 1937, founded the Sudbury Golf Club with two partners. He ran the club until his death of cancer in 1960. Green was inducted into the Hockey Hall of Fame in 1963.

== Career statistics ==
=== Regular season and playoffs ===
			Regular season					Playoffs
Season	Team	League	GP	G	A	Pts	PIM	GP	G	A	Pts	PIM
1914–15	Sudbury All-Stars	Exhib.	12	19	3	22	—	—	—	—	—	—
1914–15	Sudbury All-Stars	A-Cup	—	—	—	—	—	3	6	0	6	—
1915–16	Sudbury All-Stars	Exhib.	—	—	—	—	—	—	—	—	—	—
1916–17	Hamilton 227th Battalion	OHA-Sr.	8	17	0	17	—	—	—	—	—	—
1918–19	Hamilton Tigers	OHA-Sr.	8	12	3	15	—	4	5	3	8	—
1918–19	Hamilton Tigers	A-Cup	—	—	—	—	—	2	3	0	3	—
1919–20	Sudbury Wolves	NOHA	6	23	4	27	16	7	13	4	17	8
1920–21	Sudbury Wolves	NOHA	4	4	2	6	7	—	—	—	—	—
1921–22	Sudbury Wolves	NOHA	9	5	4	9	9	—	—	—	—	—
1922–23	Sudbury Wolves	NOHA	7	3	1	4	16	1	0	1	1	2
1923–24	Hamilton Tigers	NHL	22	7	6	13	31	—	—	—	—	—
1924–25	Hamilton Tigers	NHL	28	18	9	27	63	—	—	—	—	—
1925–26	New York Americans	NHL	32	6	4	10	40	—	—	—	—	—
1926–27	New York Americans	NHL	21	2	1	3	17	—	—	—	—	—
1928–29	Duluth Hornets	AHA	—	1	1	2	47	—	—	—	—	—
1929–30	Duluth Hornets	AHA	2	0	0	0	2	—	—	—	—	—
1930–31	Duluth Hornets	AHA	1	0	0	0	8	—	—	—	—	—
NHL totals			103	33	20	53	151	—	—	—	—	—

=== Coaching career ===
Season	Team	League	G	W	L	T	Pts	Division rank	Result
1927–28	New York Americans	NHL	44	11	27	6	28	5th Canadian	Out of playoffs
1928–29	Duluth Hornets	AHA	40	15	21	4	34	–	–
1929–30	Duluth Hornets	AHA	48	18	13	17	53	–	–
1930–31	Duluth Hornets	AHA	48	28	19	1	57	–	–
1931–32	Tulsa Oilers	AHA	48	16	28	4	36	–	–
1932–33	Hamilton Tigers	OHA Sr.	22	15	7	0	30	–	–
NHL totals			44	11	27	6			

== Bibliography ==
- Hockey Hall of Fame (2003). Honoured Members: Hockey Hall of Fame. Bolton, Ontario: Fenn Publishing. ISBN 1-55168-239-7.
- MacLeod, Alan Livingstone (2018), From Rinks to Regiments: Hockey Hall-of-Famers and the Great War, Victoria, British Columbia: Heritage House, ISBN 978-1-77203-268-0
- Podnieks, Andrew (2003), Players: The ultimate A–Z guide of everyone who has ever played in the NHL, Toronto: Doubleday Canada, ISBN 0-385-25999-9

Preceded by Newsy Lalonde	Head coach of the New York Americans; 1927–28	Succeeded by Tommy Gorman
