= Leo Lafrance =

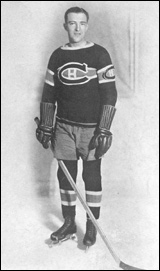
- Born: November 3, 1902 L'Isle-aux-Allumettes, Quebec, Canada
- Died: April 7, 1993 (aged 90) Duluth, Minnesota, U.S.
- Height: 5 ft 8 in (173 cm)
- Weight: 160 lb (73 kg; 11 st 6 lb)
- Position: Left wing
- Shot: Left
- Played for: Montreal Canadiens; Chicago Black Hawks
- Playing career: 1921–1936

Leonard Joseph LaFrance (November 3, 1902 – April 7, 1993) was a Canadian ice hockey forward who played 34 games in the National Hockey League for the Montreal Canadiens and Chicago Black Hawks during the 1926–27 and 1927–28 seasons. The rest of his career, which lasted from 1921 to 1936, was spent in different minor leagues. He was born in L'Isle-aux-Allumettes, Quebec, but grew up in Coniston, Ontario. His nickname was "The Flying Frenchman"

== Playing career ==
LaFrance played the position of Left Wing for the National Hockey League's Montreal Canadiens from 1927 to 1928, and the Chicago Black Hawks from 1927 to 1928. His total NHL career consisted of 34 games played and 2 goals scored. Prior to joining the NHL, LaFrance was noted as a decent goal scorer with several minor league teams including the Sudbury Cub Wolves of the NOJHA, Iroquois Falls Papermakers of the NOHA, and the Duluth Hornets of the USAHA and CHL. His best year in hockey was from 1930–31 when as a member of the AHA's Tulsa Oilers he scored 42 points.

== After hockey ==
He retired from playing hockey following the 1935–36 season with the Seattle Seahawks of the NWHL. His honors include being a member of the CHL Second All-Star Team in 1935. During World War II, he worked in an ordinance plant for the Johnson and Lord company. LaFrance later took a job as an electrician and estimator for the Universal Electric Company, in Duluth, Minnesota. He retired in 1969. He spent the rest of his life living quietly in Duluth, and spending time with friends and family, and died peacefully in 1993 at the age of 90.

== Career statistics ==
=== Regular season and playoffs ===
			Regular season					Playoffs
Season	Team	League	GP	G	A	Pts	PIM	GP	G	A	Pts	PIM
1920–21	Sudbury Cub Wolves	NOJHA	2	2	2	4	—	5	7	4	11	—
1921–22	Iroquois Falls Flyers	NOHA	—	—	—	—	—	7	7	5	12	—
1922–23	Iroquois Falls Papermakers	NOHA	—	—	—	—	—	—	—	—	—	—
1923–24	Iroquois Falls Papermakers	NOHA	8	2	1	3	15	—	—	—	—	—
1924–25	Duluth Hornets	USAHA	31	6	0	6	—	—	—	—	—	—
1925–26	Duluth Hornets	CHL	40	8	2	10	28	8	1	1	2	12
1926–27	Montreal Canadiens	NHL	4	0	0	0	0	—	—	—	—	—
1926–27	Duluth Hornets	AHA	37	12	4	16	41	3	2	0	2	0
1927–28	Montreal Canadiens	NHL	15	1	0	1	2	—	—	—	—	—
1927–28	Chicago Black Hawks	NHL	15	1	0	1	4	—	—	—	—	—
1927–28	Kansas City Pla-Mors	AHA	13	1	0	1	8	3	0	0	0	2
1928–29	Tulsa Oilers	AHA	40	19	7	26	33	4	0	0	0	4
1930–31	Tulsa Oilers	AHA	48	27	15	42	41	4	3	0	3	6
1931–32	Tulsa Oilers	AHA	48	11	5	16	51	—	—	—	—	—
1932–33	Duluth Hornets	AHA	39	16	8	24	32	—	—	—	—	—
1933–34	Duluth Hornets	CHL	14	0	0	0	41	—	—	—	—	—
1933–34	Tulsa Oilers	AHA	31	6	10	16	35	4	1	0	1	0
1934–35	Minneapolis Millers	CHL	46	16	11	27	26	5	2	3	5	2
1935–36	Rochester Cardinals	IHL	9	1	0	1	7	—	—	—	—	—
1935–36	Calgary Tigers	NWHL	3	0	0	0	2	—	—	—	—	—
1935–36	Seattle Seahawks	NWHL	26	8	5	13	24	4	3	2	5	2
AHA totals			256	92	49	141	241	18	6	0	6	12
NHL totals			34	2	0	2	6	—	—	—	—	—
