= Bob Davis (ice hockey) =

Canadian ice hockey player

- Born: February 2, 1899; Lachine, Quebec, Canada
- Died: July 15, 1970 (aged 71)
- Height: 6 ft 0 in (183 cm)
- Weight: 202 lb (92 kg; 14 st 6 lb)
- Position: Right Wing
- Shot: Right
- Played for: Detroit Red Wings
- Playing career: 1922–1936

Robert Amos "Friday" Davis (February 2, 1899 – July 15, 1970) was a Canadian ice hockey winger.

== Career ==
Davis played three games in the National Hockey League with the Detroit Red Wings during the 1932–33 season. The rest of his career, which lasted from 1923 to 1936, was spent in various senior and minor leagues.

== Career statistics ==
=== Regular season and playoffs ===
			Regular season					Playoffs
Season	Team	League	GP	G	A	Pts	PIM	GP	G	A	Pts	PIM
1922–23	Eveleth Reds	USAHA	19	3	0	3	—	—	—	—	—	—
1923–24	Fort William Forts	TBSHL	12	2	2	4	2	—	—	—	—	—
1924–25	Fort William Forts	TBSHL	19	2	2	4	—	—	—	—	—	—
1925–26	Fort William Forts	TBSHL	17	4	0	4	22	3	1	0	1	12
1926–27	Fort William Forts	TBSHL	20	10	1	11	18	2	0	0	0	0
1927–28	Fort William Forts	TBSHL	21	10	3	13	12	2	0	0	0	2
1928–29	Duluth Hornets	AHA	40	6	3	9	79	—	—	—	—	—
1929–30	Duluth Hornets	AHA	48	7	4	11	61	4	0	0	0	2
1930–31	Duluth Hornets	AHA	48	7	8	15	68	4	0	1	1	4
1932–33	Detroit Red Wings	NHL	3	0	0	0	0	—	—	—	—	—
1932–33	Detroit Olympics	IHL	22	1	1	2	26	—	—	—	—	—
1933–34	Montreal LaFontaine Bleus	MCHL	16	5	7	12	2	—	—	—	—	—
1934–35	Montreal LaFontaine Bleus	MCHL	19	2	4	6	4	—	—	—	—	—
1935–36	Fort William Forts	TBSHL	—	—	—	—	—	—	—	—	—	—
AHA totals			136	20	15	35	208	8	0	1	1	6
NHL totals			3	0	0	0	0	—	—	—	—	—
