= Jack Connolly (ice hockey, born 1900) =

Canadian ice hockey player

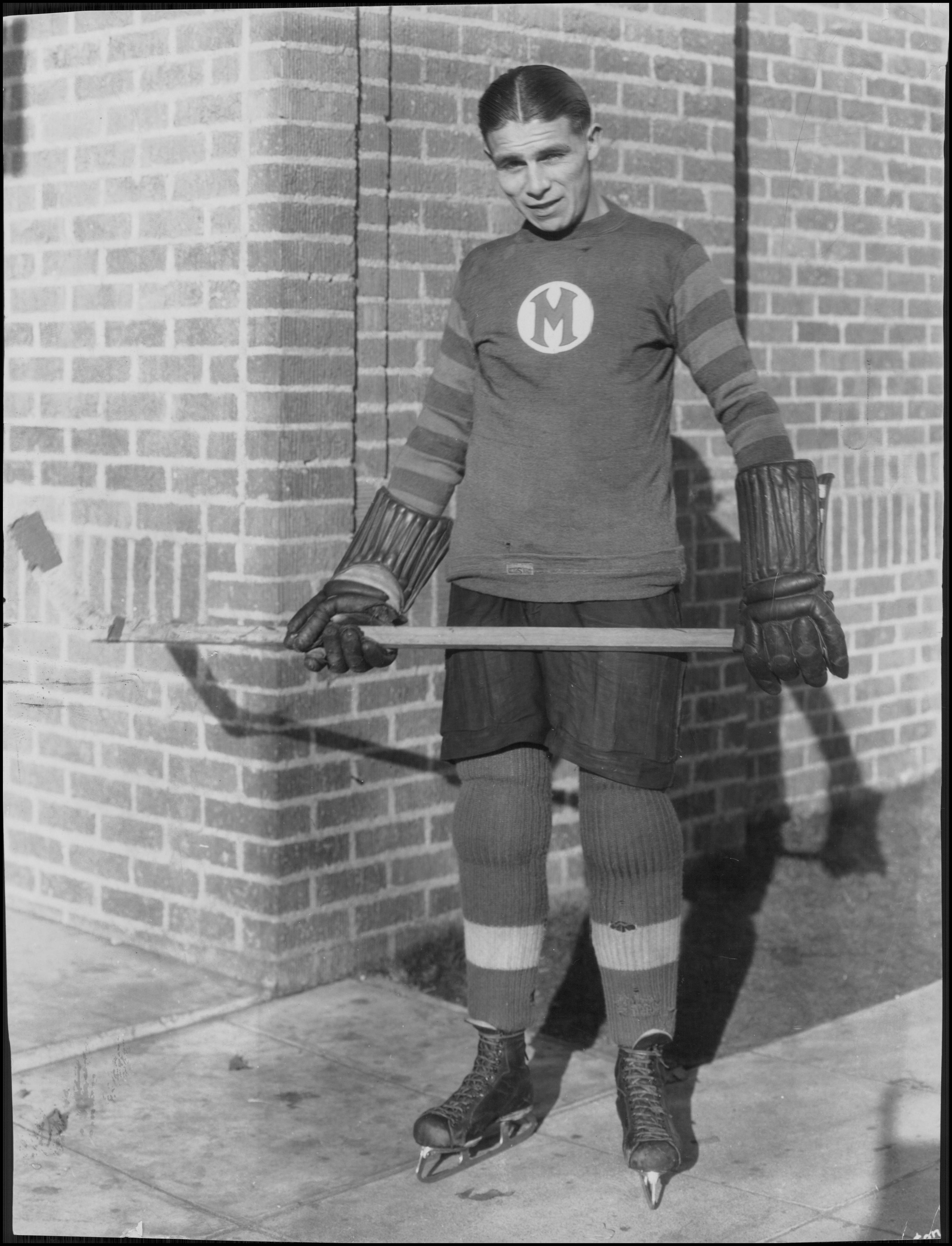
- Born: August 24, 1900 St. Laurent, Manitoba, Canada
- Died: July 16, 1967 (aged 66)
- Height: 5 ft 10 in (178 cm)
- Weight: 160 lb (73 kg; 11 st 6 lb)
- Position: Right wing
- Shot: Right
- Played for: CHL; Minneapolis Millers; WCHL; Vancouver Maroons; PrHL; Moose Jaw Warriors; CPHL; Stratford Nationals; Windsor Hornets; AHA; St. Paul Saints
- Playing career: 1922–1929

John Joseph Connolly (August 24, 1900 – July 16, 1967) was a Canadian ice hockey player who played in the professional leagues during the 1920s.

Connolly played Major League hockey with the 1925–26 Vancouver Maroons of the Western Canada Hockey League.

== Career statistics ==
			Regular season
Season	Team	League	GP	G	A	Pts	PIM
1925–26	Minneapolis Millers	CHL	7	0	0	0	7
1925–26	Vancouver Maroons	WCHL	15	3	2	5	2
1926–27	Moose Jaw Warriors	PrHL	32	29	24	53	61
1927–28	Stratford Nationals/Windsor Hornets	CPHL	32	5	3	8	9
1928–29	St. Paul Saints	AHA	25	6	1	7	24
