= Paul Loudon =

American athlete and sports coach (1892-1953)

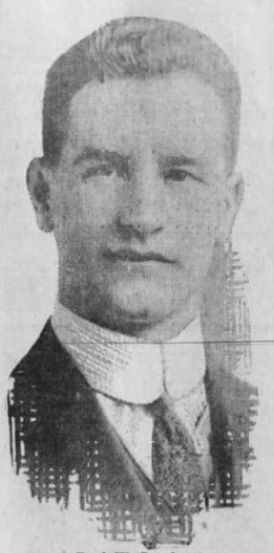

Biographical details
- Born: c. 1892
- Died: December 1, 1953 (aged 61); Hennepin County, Minnesota, U.S.

Playing career

Football
- 1910–1913: Dartmouth
- 1914: Annex

Basketball
- ?–1914: Dartmouth

Baseball
- ?–1914: Dartmouth
- Position: End (football)

Coaching career (HC unless noted)

Football
- 1914–1915: Dartmouth (asst.)
- 1916: St. Thomas
- 1919: Dartmouth (asst.)
- 1920–1921: Dartmouth (ends)
- 1922: Minnesota (backs/ends/wings)

Basketball
- 1914–1916: Dartmouth
- 1919–1920: St. Thomas
- 1921–1922: Washburn-Crosby

Baseball
- c. 1915: Dartmouth (freshmen)

Administrative career (AD unless noted)
- 1924–1925: USAHA (executive)
- c. 1926–1930: Minneapolis Millers (president/director)
- 1928–?: AHA (vice president)
- 1930–1931: NAHA (president)
- 1931–1935: CHL (president)
- 1944–1947: USHL (president)

Paul Witmer "Red" Loudon (c. 1892 – December 1, 1953) was an American athlete and sports coach. After playing multiple sports in college for Dartmouth, Loudon started a coaching career, spending several years with his alma mater as well as the College of St. Thomas (now known as the University of St. Thomas) and the University of Minnesota. He later served as the president of several hockey leagues.

== Early life and education ==
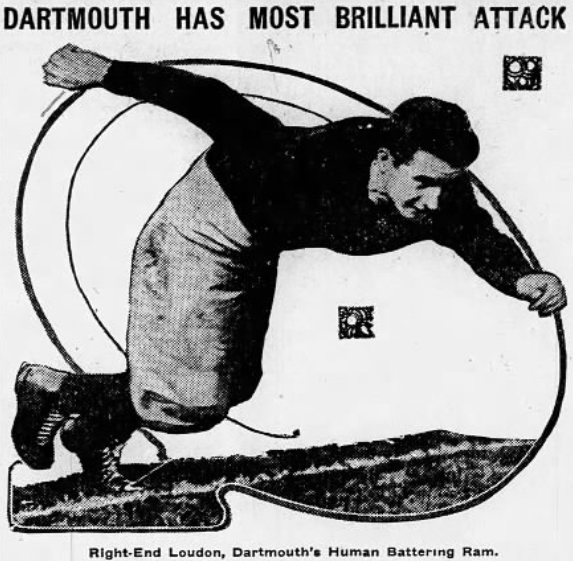
Loudon at Dartmouth

Loudon was born in c. 1892, and grew up in Troy, New York. He attended Dartmouth College, starring in football, baseball, and basketball. He played from 1910 to 1913 at end in football and was "regarded as one of the greatest ends in the history of the gridiron sport at the Hanover [Dartmouth] school," being selected to Walter Camp's All-America team according to one source. He was described by one newspaper as a "human battering ram."

As a senior in football, Loudon was listed as a first-team All-American in an article published by The Washington Times. He was also team captain in both basketball and baseball in his senior year.

After graduating, Loudon was given an award for being the best all-around student-athlete at Dartmouth. His name was later inscribed on the award. In his time with the school, Loudon "was chosen by his fellow students to nearly every place of honor in their power to give."

Loudon played at end for the "Annex football eleven of New Haven" in their December 1914 game against the Washington Glee Club.

== Coaching career ==
In June 1914, Loudon was named head basketball coach as well as assistant football coach at Dartmouth. He later became the freshman baseball coach.

After his first season at Dartmouth, it was reported that Rensselaer Polytechnic Institute (RPI) had offered Loudon a contract to be athletic director. The school later denied the report.

In February 1916, Loudon severed his relations with Dartmouth to enter the banking business in Minneapolis. In April, it was announced by Reverend John Dunphy that Loudon had accepted a position as head football coach at the College of St. Thomas (now known as the University of St. Thomas) in Minnesota. He was the successor to Earle T. Pickering. Loudon, who "believe[d] in preparedness," started the football practices that month, which was the first time in school history that the practices started in spring. A six-game schedule was announced, with games against North Dakota, North Dakota Agricultural, Marquette, DePaul, Macalester, and St. Joseph's. In September, he was called to be an artilleryman at Fort Snelling. He was succeeded by Bob Saxton as St. Thomas coach.

It was believed that Loudon was willing to coach the 1917 St. Thomas football team; however, George Keogan ultimately coached the Cadets that year.

In 1919, Loudon returned to his alma mater, Dartmouth, to become an assistant coach. After the football season ended, he returned to Minnesota to serve as the basketball coach at St. Thomas. He later came back to Dartmouth as ends coach for the 1920 football season.

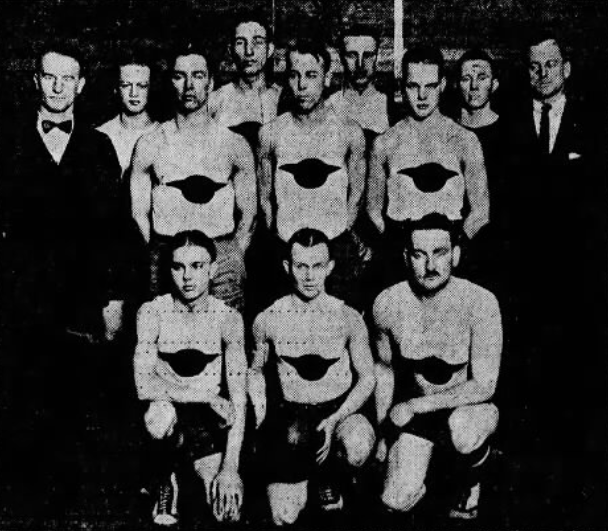
1922 Washburn-Crosby team. Top row, first from the left is Loudon.

In the 1921–1922 basketball season, Loudon coached Washburn-Crosby, leading them to the Minneapolis city championship game against Emerson.

Loudon started the training season with Dartmouth in 1922, but left in September to be named head assistant football coach at the University of Minnesota. Associated Press (AP) reports stated that he was going to coach the ends and assist with the backfield. An October report in The Times stated that he was also coaching the wings. Loudon helped Minnesota compile a record of 3–3–1 in his first year with the team. In July 1923, he resigned, stating he wanted to devote full time to his business affairs. "I dislike very much to give up my football duties at Minnesota for football is a hobby with me and I enjoy coaching," Loudon said. "My business has become so heavy, however, that I cannot spare the time necessary for coaching and scouting football games." Athletic director Fred Luehring said "We will miss Paul Loudon very much because he is an excellent coach and rendered valuable services to us last fall."

In the next several years, Loudon took "time out" from his business at certain times to assist in coaching his alma mater, Dartmouth College, in football.

== Later career ==
In October 1923, Loudon represented Minneapolis at United States Amateur Hockey Association (USAHA) meetings. He requested a team be based in the city and was "so certain ... that Minneapolis [would] be permitted to enter the league that he rounded up a list of stars which should make an impressive show." The application was accepted and Loudon became the team's manager. In October 1924, Loudon was elected to the USAHA board of executives to a three-year term. The league disbanded following the 1924–25 season.

In 1926, Loudon became the head of the Central Hockey League (CHL). Around that time, he was named president of the Northwest Skating Association (NSA). In 1928, he was named vice president of the American Hockey Association (AHA). At the same time, Loudon served as an owner, president, and director of the Minneapolis Millers. He left the Millers after the 1929–30 season.

In the 1930–31 season, Loudon became the president of the Northwest Amateur Hockey Association (NAHA). In 1931–32, he became the president of the Central Hockey League (CHL). A February 1933 article in The Minneapolis Tribune was titled "Paul Loudon Proves Real Leader" and stated "the National Hockey league thrives because Frank Calder rules with an 'iron hand.' The Central Hockey league will thrive for the same reason as long as it chooses to keep Paul Loudon as its head." He remained president through the league's final year in 1934–35.

In the late 1930s, Loudon served as president of the Minneapolis Hockey Association, Inc. Loudon was elected president of the AHA in June 1944, succeeding Lyle Wright. The league was renamed the United States Hockey League (USHL) shortly afterwards. Although most of the teams supported his re-election in 1947, Loudon stated he did not wish to be league president again. The league's championship trophy was later named after him.

According to an article in the Star Tribune, it was through the "untiring efforts of such fine sportsmen as ... Paul Loudon" that hockey became one of the most popular sports in Minneapolis.

== Personal life and death ==
Loudon entered business in Minneapolis during 1915, being a member of the Minnesota Loan & Trust Company until 1921, when he joined the Lane, Piper and Jaffray Inc. as vice president. He was one of the original partners of Piper, Jaffray and Hopwood, which was formed in 1932. In December 1922, Loudon was elected vice president of the Twin City Bond Club. He later became the president. He served as a member of the Board of Trustees of Carleton College in 1931 and was a member of Dartmouth's athletic board by 1935.

In August 1934, Loudon "utilized an old-time flying tackle" to capture a burglar in his home.

In 1941, Loudon became the Minnesota representative on Investment Bankers of America (IBA). The following year, he was elected executive manager of the Ninth Federal Reserve District victory fund committee. In 1943, he was a member of the county war finance committee. In 1946, Loudon was elected president of the Minneapolis Civic Council, succeeding William D. Naffziger.

On December 1, 1953, Loudon died at the age of 61, at the Northwestern Hospital in Hennepin County, following a two-week illness. An article in The Minneapolis Star said "It didn't make any difference whether it was baseball, football, hockey, tennis or golf, he always was on hand enjoying every minute of every competitive activity. He was a student of all of them. His tremendous enthusiasm, his fine leadership and his willingness to help all sports will be sorely missed in these parts." An article in the Minneapolis Morning Tribune said the following:

Paul (Red) Loudon, who died Tuesday, was an all-around athlete and an all-around fan. His skills were many in his college days at Dartmouth. His interests were even more varied when he pursued sports as a coach, a fan and a sponsor. This city did not have a more enlightened, more enthusiastic, more stable or more farsighted sportsman. Without giving his sports interest a greater prominence than it should have in the life of a successful business man, Red made countless valuable contributions to college and professional sports. The life of professional hockey in this area was prolonged for years because of his energy and intelligent direction ... His name belongs among the very elite in any gallery of sports heroes at Dartmouth college or in the city of Minneapolis.
