= Gus Marker =

Canadian ice hockey player

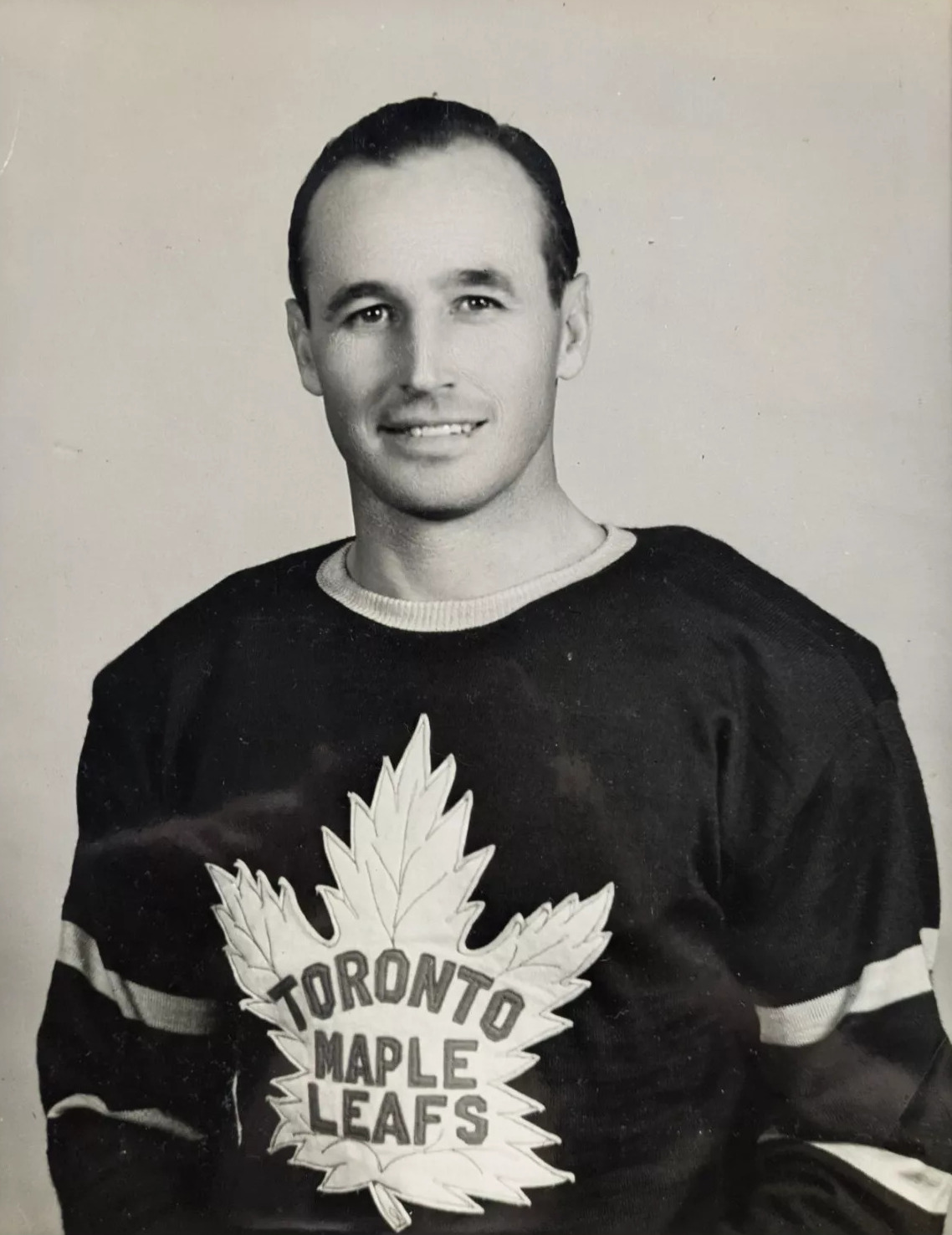
- Marker with the Toronto Maple Leafs, c. 1940
- Born: August 1, 1905 Wetaskiwin, Alberta, Canada
- Died: October 7, 1997 (aged 92) Kingston, Ontario, Canada
- Height: 5 ft 9 in (175 cm)
- Weight: 162 lb (73 kg; 11 st 8 lb)
- Position: Right wing
- Shot: Right
- Played for: Detroit Red Wings; Montreal Maroons; Toronto Maple Leafs; Brooklyn Americans
- Playing career: 1928–1942

Augustus Solberg Marker (August 1, 1905 – October 7, 1997) was a Canadian professional ice hockey right winger who had played ten seasons in the National Hockey League (NHL) for the Detroit Red Wings, Montreal Maroons, Toronto Maple Leafs and Brooklyn Americans between 1932 and 1942.

== Playing career ==
In 336 NHL games, Marker scored 64 goals, and 69 assists for 133 points in his career.

=== Career notes ===
- Marker was the last surviving member of the Montreal Maroons 1935 Stanley Cup championship team.
- Marker played in the longest hockey game in NHL history while a member of the Montreal Maroons. A Stanley Cup playoff game on March 24, 1936, when the Detroit Red Wings defeated the Maroons 1–0 in the sixth overtime period.

== Retirement ==
After retiring from professional hockey, Marker settled in Kingston, Ontario. He operated a building materials business and helped develop a subdivision in the northern section of the city. The subdivision was originally called Marker's Acres and paid homage to two of his most respected teammates with the naming of Conacher Drive and Morenz Crescent. He became a member of the Kiwanis Club in Kingston and an enthusiastic booster of amateur sport in the region. Since 1980, the Kiwanis Club of Kingston has presented awards, including the Gus Marker Trophy, to honour outstanding amateur athletes in the city and district. Past winners of the Gus Marker Trophy have included boxer Mark Leduc (1992), hockey players Alyn McCauley (1996) and Jayna Hefford (1997), golfer Matt McQuillan (1999), and triathlete Simon Whitfield (2000).

== Career statistics ==
=== Regular season and playoffs ===
			Regular season					Playoffs
Season	Team	League	GP	G	A	Pts	PIM	GP	G	A	Pts	PIM
1927–28	Edmonton Elks	ESrHL	—	—	—	—	—	—	—	—	—	—
1928–29	Tulsa Oilers	AHA	36	10	5	15	39	4	1	0	1	2
1929–30	Tulsa Oilers	AHA	48	13	7	20	31	9	1	1	2	2
1930–31	Tulsa Oilers	AHA	48	21	11	32	42	4	1	1	2	8
1931–32	Tulsa Oilers	AHA	44	11	7	18	20	—	—	—	—	—
1932–33	Detroit Red Wings	NHL	13	1	1	2	8	—	—	—	—	—
1932–33	Detroit Olympics	IHL	27	6	7	13	31	—	—	—	—	—
1933–34	Detroit Red Wings	NHL	7	1	0	1	2	4	0	0	0	2
1933–34	Detroit Olympics	IHL	37	13	13	26	48	6	3	6	9	2
1934–35	Montreal Maroons	NHL	44	11	4	15	18	7	1	1	2	4
1934–35	Windsor Bulldogs	IHL	3	1	2	3	2	—	—	—	—	—
1935–36	Montreal Maroons	NHL	48	7	12	19	10	3	1	0	1	2
1936–37	Montreal Maroons	NHL	47	10	12	22	22	5	0	1	1	0
1937–38	Montreal Maroons	NHL	48	9	15	24	35	—	—	—	—	—
1938–39	Toronto Maple Leafs	NHL	29	9	6	15	11	10	2	2	4	0
1939–40	Toronto Maple Leafs	NHL	42	10	9	19	15	10	1	3	4	23
1940–41	Toronto Maple Leafs	NHL	27	4	5	9	10	7	0	0	0	5
1941–42	Brooklyn Americans	NHL	17	2	5	7	2	—	—	—	—	—
1941–42	Springfield Indians	AHL	16	10	6	16	6	—	—	—	—	—
1942–43	Kingston Frontenacs	OVHL	4	0	4	4	2	4	2	5	7	0
NHL totals			322	64	69	133	133	46	5	7	12	36

== Awards and achievements ==
- 1935 Stanley Cup Champion (Montreal Maroons)
