= Jack Leswick =

Canadian ice hockey player

- Born: January 1, 1910 Humboldt, Saskatchewan, Canada
- Died: August 4, 1934 (aged 24) Winnipeg, Manitoba, Canada
- Height: 5 ft 6 in (168 cm)
- Weight: 155 lb (70 kg; 11 st 1 lb)
- Position: Centre
- Shot: Right
- Played for: Chicago Black Hawks
- Playing career: 1929–1934

Jack Leswick (January 1, 1910 – August 4, 1934) was a Canadian ice hockey centre who played 37 games in the National Hockey League with the Chicago Black Hawks during the 1933–34 season. The bulk of his career, which lasted from 1929 to 1934, was mainly spent in the American Hockey Association. Leswick died in the summer of 1934, shortly after Chicago won the Stanley Cup.

== Playing career ==
Jack Leswick played 3½ seasons for the Duluth Hornets of the AHA. He spent the second half of 1932–33 playing for the Wichita Blue Jays. He began the 1934 season in the AHA playing for the Kansas City Greyhounds. Leswick was called up to the Chicago Black Hawks shortly after the beginning of the 1934 season. He played 37 games, scoring 1 goal and 7 assists and was assessed 16 penalty minutes (PIM), as Chicago won the Stanley Cup championship that spring, though Leswick did not play any playoff games.

== Suspicious death ==
Leswick died in the off-season after the 1933–34 season. His body was found in the Assiniboine River without his wallet or other valuables. Leswick's death was ruled either a suicide or accident by the Winnipeg Coroner.

== Personal life ==
Two of Leswick's brothers, Pete and Tony, also played in the NHL. Leswick's nephew is former Major League Baseball player Lenny Dykstra.

== Career statistics ==
=== Regular season and playoffs ===
			Regular season					Playoffs
Season	Team	League	GP	G	A	Pts	PIM	GP	G	A	Pts	PIM
1929–30	Drumheller Miners	ASHL	11	14	5	19	15	—	—	—	—	—
1929–30	Duluth Hornets	AHA	13	1	1	2	6	3	0	0	0	4
1930–31	Duluth Hornets	AHA	41	22	9	31	27	4	0	1	1	4
1931–32	Duluth Hornets	AHA	34	9	7	16	36	8	0	5	5	4
1932–33	Wichita Blue Jays	AHA	41	22	18	40	76	—	—	—	—	—
1933–34	Kansas City Greyhounds	AHA	8	1	5	6	14	—	—	—	—	—
1933–34	Chicago Black Hawks	NHL	37	1	7	8	16	—	—	—	—	—
AHA totals			137	55	40	95	159	15	0	6	6	12
NHL totals			37	1	7	8	16	—	—	—	—	—

== Awards and achievements ==
- 1934 Stanley Cup Championship (Chicago Black Hawks)

== See also ==
- List of ice hockey players who died during their playing career
