= Vern Turner =

American ice hockey coach and player (1895–1960)

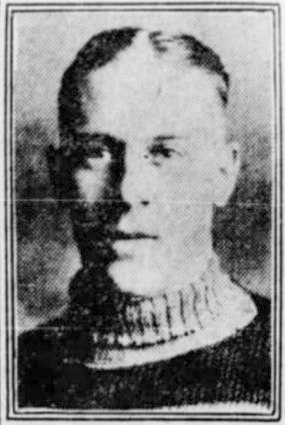
- Turner with Cleveland AC circa 1922

Biographical details
- Born: June 9, 1895; Stayner, Ontario, Canada
- Died: May 28, 1960 (aged 64)

Playing career
- 1924–1925: Cleveland Hockey Club
- 1925–1933: Duluth Hornets
- 1933–1934: Oklahoma City Warriors
- Position: Goaltender

Coaching career (HC unless noted)
- 1949–1951: Denver

Head coaching record
- Overall: 15-24-1 (.388)

Accomplishments and honors

Championships
- 1927 AHA Championship

Vernon Wilbert Turner (June 9, 1895 – May 28, 1960) was an American ice hockey coach and player who was the first person to lead the program at the University of Denver.

== Career ==
Hailing from Stayner, Ontario, Vern Turner got his start as a goaltender with a team in Cleveland, Ohio before moving on to the Duluth Hornets. After only one year of existence the Central Hockey League (1925–1926) shifted from being a senior amateur league to a professional league. Turner was the starting goalie for Duluth in the newly created American Hockey Association, leading the team to a regular season and playoff championship in the first year. The league was hardly stable, however, and despite good showing on the ice even the Hornets weren't saved from the troubles, transferring to Wichita halfway through the 1932–33 season. That year proved to be Turner's last with the team and he hung up his skates for good after one final season with the Oklahoma City Warriors.

Though his playing career was over Turner remained close to the game, becoming the rink manager for the Broadmoor Ice Palace in Colorado Springs before he was asked to head the new program at Denver in 1949. While the Pioneers only won 4 games their first season of play, Turner was able to lead them to an 11-11-1 mark in their sophomore campaign before turning the team over to former Michigan standout Neil Celley.

== Head coaching record ==
Record table
Season	Team	Overall	Conference	Standing	Postseason
Denver Pioneers Independent (1949–1951)
1949–50	Denver	4–13–0			
1950–51	Denver	11–11–1			
Denver:		15–24–1			
Total:		15–24–1			
National champion Postseason invitational champion Conference regular season champion Conference regular season and conference tournament champion Division regular season champion Division regular season and conference tournament champion Conference tournament champion
