= Laurie Scott (ice hockey) =

Canadian ice hockey player

- Born: June 19, 1896 South River, Ontario, Canada
- Died: February 15, 1977 (aged 80)
- Height: 5 ft 6 in (168 cm)
- Weight: 185 lb (84 kg; 13 st 3 lb)
- Position: Left wing
- Shot: Left
- Played for: Saskatoon Sheiks; New York Americans; New York Rangers
- Playing career: 1922–1935

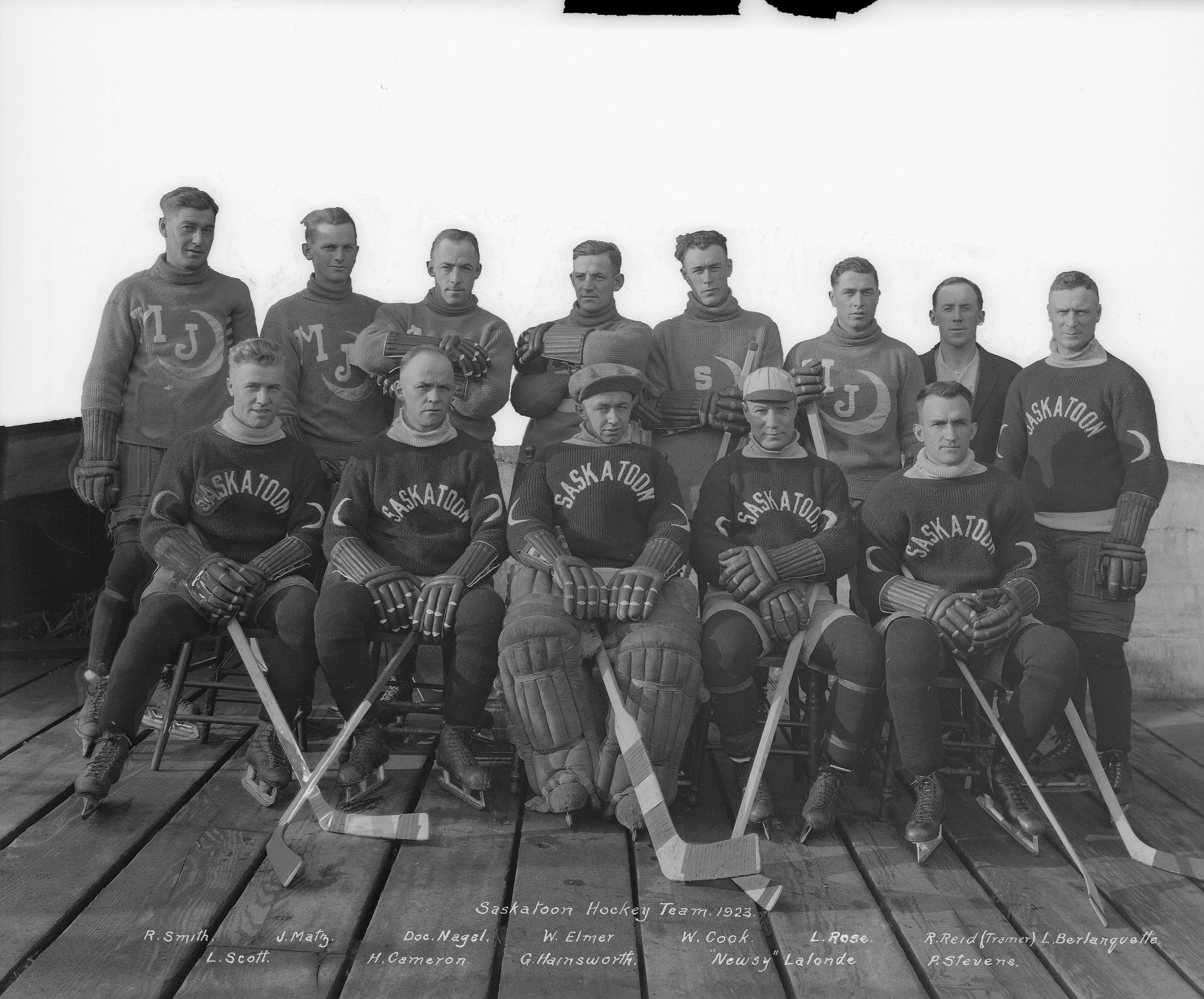
Scott, sitting far left, with the Saskatoon Sheiks/Crescents in 1923–24.

Lawrence Young Scott (June 19, 1896 – February 15, 1977) was a Canadian professional ice hockey player from South River, Ontario who played 62 games in the National Hockey League and 106 games in the Western Canada Hockey League between 1922 and 1928. He played with the New York Rangers, New York Americans, and Saskatoon Sheiks.

In 1928 Scott played 23 of 44 regular season games. His name was left off the Stanley Cup, because he was sent to the minors before the playoffs. The Rangers included Scott on the mid-season picture with the team, but not the Stanley Cup winning team picture.

== Career statistics ==
=== Regular season and playoffs ===
			Regular season					Playoffs
Season	Team	League	GP	G	A	Pts	PIM	GP	G	A	Pts	PIM
1921–22	Melville Millionaires	S-SSHL	—	—	—	—	—	—	—	—	—	—
1922–23	Saskatoon Crescents	WCHL	21	7	6	13	6	—	—	—	—	—
1923–24	Saskatoon Sheiks	WCHL	30	20	5	25	8	—	—	—	—	—
1924–25	Saskatoon Sheiks	WCHL	26	12	6	18	41	2	0	0	0	2
1925–26	Saskatoon Sheiks	WCHL	29	11	4	15	31	2	0	1	1	2
1926–27	New York Americans	NHL	39	6	2	8	22	—	—	—	—	—
1927–28	New York Rangers	NHL	23	0	1	1	6	—	—	—	—	—
1927–28	Springfield Indians	Can-Am	17	3	3	6	8	4	0	0	0	2
1928–29	Springfield Indians	Can-Am	40	10	1	11	42	—	—	—	—	—
1929–30	Duluth Hornets	AHA	48	19	13	32	46	4	3	1	4	4
1930–31	Duluth Hornets	AHA	48	29	11	40	51	4	1	1	2	4
1931–32	Duluth Hornets	AHA	48	12	9	21	47	8	3	0	3	7
1932–33	Eveleth Rangers	CHL	38	10	9	19	23	3	0	0	0	5
1933–34	Oklahoma City Warriors	AHA	37	9	10	19	7	—	—	—	—	—
1934–35	St. Louis Flyers	AHA	41	17	22	39	8	3	2	4	6	0
WCHL totals			106	50	21	71	86	4	0	1	1	4
NHL totals			62	6	3	9	28	—	—	—	—	—
