= Lyle Wright =

Canadian-American ice hockey executive and businessman (1898–1963)

- Born: September 28, 1898; Winnipeg, Manitoba, Canada
- Died: May 23, 1963 (aged 64); Minneapolis, Minnesota, US
- Resting place: Lakewood Cemetery
- Occupation(s): Businessman, entertainment promoter
- Known for: Minneapolis Millers, Minneapolis Arena
- Awards: U.S. Hockey Hall of Fame
- Military career
- Allegiance: Canada
- Branch: Royal Canadian Artillery
- Battles / wars: World War I

Lyle Zealand Wright (September 28, 1898 – May 23, 1963) was a Canadian-American ice hockey executive and businessman. He managed the Minneapolis Millers for more than 20 seasons, was president of the Minneapolis Arena, and promoted entertainment events in Minneapolis including the Ice Follies. He was instrumental in growing the game of ice hockey in its early days in Minnesota and was inducted in the United States Hockey Hall of Fame.

== Early life ==
Lyle Zealand Wright was born on September 28, 1898, in Winnipeg, Manitoba, Canada. He served in the Royal Canadian Artillery in World War I, then moved to Minneapolis in 1919. He moved to Minnesota because his father had been appointed Canadian consul in Minneapolis. He married Georgia E. Dolan in 1923. They settled at 3121 East Calhoun Boulevard, on the east side of Lake Calhoun in the Uptown area of Minneapolis, and had two sons and two daughters.

== Hockey business ==
Wright's hockey career began by managing the Minneapolis Millers in the American Hockey Association (AHA) from 1928 to 1931. He spent one year as the business manager for the Chicago Blackhawks in the 1931–32 NHL season. He returned to managing the Millers in 1933, and worked his way up to be president of the Minneapolis Arena. Notable players signed by Wright during his time with the Millers include, Taffy Abel, Stewart Adams, Ching Johnson, and Tiny Thompson.

Wright later became acting president of the AHA, and on September 23, 1942, he announced that the league was suspending operations, due to World War II. The Millers went on hiatus until the AHA resumed play as the United States Hockey League (USHL) in the 1945–46 season. After four more seasons in Minneapolis, Wright made the decision to relocate the team to Denver, Colorado, becoming the state's first professional ice hockey team. He continued his role as manager of the Denver Falcons for one season, until the team folded along with the USHL in 1951.

Wright's other interests in hockey included helping to establish an annual Amateur Athletic Union hockey tournament in Minneapolis in 1930, and establishing the International Amateur Hockey League in 1936. He also cooperated with the University of Minnesota to foster the Minnesota Golden Gophers men's ice hockey program in its early days, and promoted high school hockey in the state of Minnesota.

== Other businesses ==
Wright was a self-made millionaire from promoting events, including ice shows. Wright made the Minneapolis Arena the home rink for the Ice Follies, and also booked various figure skating acts to perform. He estimated that events at the arena drew 80,000 visitors annually, which was also used in the summer for roller skating and dance nights. In 1943, he took over the operation of the Aqua Follies with business partner Al Sheehan, and made it into a profitable business within the annual summer Minneapolis Aquatennial.

== Death and legacy ==
Wright was reported to be very ill in April 1963. He died on May 23, 1963, in Minneapolis, and was interred at Lakewood Cemetery. He was a posthumous recipient of the AHAUS Citation Award in 1963. The United States Hockey Hall of Fame enshrined him in its inaugural class of 1973, for his determination to grow hockey in Minneapolis.
