= Taffy Abel =

Ice hockey player from the United States

- Born: May 28, 1900 Sault Ste. Marie, Michigan, U.S.
- Died: August 1, 1964 (aged 64) Sault Ste. Marie, Michigan, U.S.
- Height: 6 ft 1 in (185 cm)
- Weight: 225 lb (102 kg; 16 st 1 lb)
- Position: Defense
- Shot: Left
- Played for: New York Rangers; Chicago Black Hawks
- National team: United States
- Playing career: 1925–1934
Medal record
Men's ice hockey
Representing the United States
Olympic Games
| Silver medal – second place | 1924 Chamonix | Team competition |

Clarence John "Taffy" Abel (May 28, 1900 – August 1, 1964) was an American professional ice hockey player who played in the National Hockey League with the New York Rangers and Chicago Black Hawks between 1926 and 1934. Born in 1900 in Sault Ste. Marie, Michigan, United States, as an Ojibwe, he hid his Native American ancestry until 1939. He was a silver medalist in ice hockey at the 1924 Winter Olympics and the U.S. flagbearer for those games, making him the first Native American to play, and to win a medal, in the Winter Olympics. He was a member of two Stanley Cup championship teams. On November 16, 1926, he became the first United States–born Native American player to become an NHL regular, with the New York Rangers. He is a member of the United States Hockey Hall of Fame.

== Playing career ==
Clarence "Taffy" Abel was a silver medalist on the United States in the 1924 Olympics, serving as flagbearer for the U.S. delegation. Abel scored 15 goals for the United States in the tournament.

As a member of the Minneapolis Millers of the CHL during the 1925–26 season, Abel was named to the CHL's First All-Star team at the defense position.

Abel played in the NHL for eight years. He scored his first NHL goal on December 7, 1926, in the New York Rangers' 1-0 road victory over the Boston Bruins.

He was signed by Conn Smythe to the New York Rangers, largely based upon his strong performance at the Winter Olympics in 1924. With the Rangers, he wore sweater number 4, and, paired with defenseman Ching Johnson, was a key member of the Stanley Cup–winning Rangers team in 1927-28. After the 1929 season, Abel's rights were sold to the Chicago Black Hawks, where he played five more years, wearing sweater number 2. Abel was a member of the Cup-winning Black Hawks in 1933-34, his last NHL season.

== Later life and legacy ==
Abel returned to Sault Ste. Marie after retirement, coaching ice hockey. He also operated a tourist resort named "Taffy’s Lodge" in Sault Ste. Marie, Michigan.

Abel died in his home in Sault Ste. Marie, on August 1, 1964, aged 64. Nine years later, he was inducted into the United States Hockey Hall of Fame as a player.

The Taffy Abel Arena, home rink for the Lake Superior State University hockey program, is named in his honor.

== Career statistics ==
=== Regular season and playoffs ===
| | | | Regular season | | | | | Playoffs |
| Season | Team | League | GP | G | A | Pts | PIM | GP | G | A | Pts | PIM |
|---|---|---|---|---|---|---|---|---|---|---|---|---|
| 1918–19 | Michigan Soo Nationals | TBSHL | — | — | — | — | — | — | — | — | — | — |
| 1919–20 | Michigan Soo Wildcats | TBSHL | 8 | 3 | 1 | 4 | 26 | — | — | — | — | — |
| 1920–21 | Michigan Soo Wildcats | TBSHL | — | — | — | — | — | — | — | — | — | — |
| 1921–22 | Michigan Soo Wildcats | TBSHL | — | — | — | — | — | — | — | — | — | — |
| 1922–23 | St. Paul Athletic Club | USAHA | 18 | 3 | 0 | 3 | — | 4 | 0 | 0 | 0 | 0 |
| 1923–24 | St. Paul Athletic Club | USAHA | 3 | 1 | 0 | 1 | — | 8 | 0 | 0 | 0 | 0 |
| 1924–25 | St. Paul Saints | USAHA | 39 | 8 | 0 | 8 | — | — | — | — | — | — |
| 1925–26 | Minneapolis Millers | CHL | 35 | 11 | 10 | 21 | 56 | — | — | — | — | — |
| 1926–27 | New York Rangers | NHL | 44 | 8 | 4 | 12 | 78 | 2 | 0 | 1 | 1 | 6 |
| 1927–28 | New York Rangers | NHL | 23 | 0 | 1 | 1 | 28 | 9 | 1 | 0 | 1 | 14 |
| 1928–29 | New York Rangers | NHL | 44 | 3 | 1 | 4 | 41 | 6 | 0 | 0 | 0 | 8 |
| 1929–30 | Chicago Black Hawks | NHL | 38 | 3 | 3 | 6 | 42 | 2 | 0 | 0 | 0 | 10 |
| 1930–31 | Chicago Black Hawks | NHL | 43 | 0 | 1 | 1 | 45 | 9 | 0 | 0 | 0 | 8 |
| 1931–32 | Chicago Black Hawks | NHL | 48 | 3 | 3 | 6 | 34 | 2 | 0 | 0 | 0 | 2 |
| 1932–33 | Chicago Black Hawks | NHL | 47 | 0 | 4 | 4 | 63 | — | — | — | — | — |
| 1933–34 | Chicago Black Hawks | NHL | 46 | 2 | 1 | 3 | 28 | 8 | 0 | 0 | 0 | 8 |
| NHL totals | | | 333 | 19 | 18 | 37 | 359 | 38 | 1 | 1 | 2 | 56 |

=== International ===
| Year | Team | Event | GP | G | A | Pts | PIM |
|---|---|---|---|---|---|---|---|
| 1924 | United States | OLY | 5 | 15 | 0 | 15 | 8 |
| Senior totals | | | 5 | 15 | 0 | 15 | 8 |

== See also ==
- Race and ethnicity in the NHL

Olympic Games
| Preceded by Pat McDonald | Flagbearer for United States; Chamonix 1924 | Succeeded by Pat McDonald |
