= John Mitchell (ice hockey, born 1895) =

Canadian ice hockey player (1895–1957)

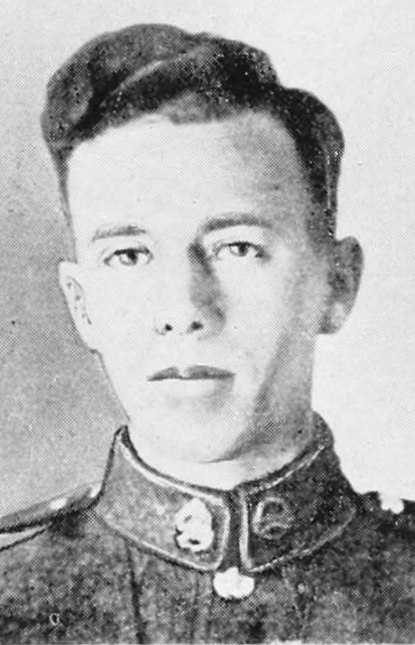
- Mitchell with the Canadian military forces (World War I)
- Born: November 2, 1895 Elton, Manitoba, Canada
- Died: March 15, 1957 (aged 61) Fort Worth, Texas, U.S.
- Height: 5 ft 8 in (173 cm)
- Weight: 150 lb (68 kg; 10 st 10 lb)
- Position: Centre
- Shot: Right
- Played for: Regina Capitals; Duluth Hornets; Winnipeg 61st Battalion
- Playing career: 1914–1934

John Angus "Johnny" Mitchell (November 2, 1895 – March 15, 1957) was a Canadian professional ice hockey player. He played with the Regina Capitals of the Western Canada Hockey League in the 1921–22 season. Mitchell then moved to the American Hockey Association where her played for the Duluth Hornets from 1926 to 1934. He also played a brief stint for the Buffalo Americans in the 1930–31 season. Mitchell was also a playing coach for the Hornets in 1931–32.

After his retirement, he continued coaching, serving as head coach of the Springfield Indians from 1938 to 1942, and later with the Providence Reds and St. Louis Flyers.

Mitchell's father came from England and his mother Helgu Pálsdóttur was an Icelandic immigrant to Manitoba. During the 1915–16 season Mitchell was a member of the Winnipeg 61st Battalion team which captured the Allan Cup as amateur champions of Canada.
