= Tom Cook (ice hockey) =

Canadian ice hockey player (1907–1961)

- Born: May 7, 1907 Fort William, Ontario, Canada
- Died: October 2, 1961 (aged 54)
- Height: 5 ft 7 in (170 cm)
- Weight: 140 lb (64 kg; 10 st 0 lb)
- Position: Centre
- Shot: Left
- Played for: Chicago Black Hawks; Montreal Maroons
- Playing career: 1925–1938

Thomas John Cook (May 7, 1907 – October 2, 1961) was a Canadian professional ice hockey forward who played 348 games in the National Hockey League with the Chicago Black Hawks and Montreal Maroons between 1929 and 1938. He won the Stanley Cup with Chicago in 1934. Cook was born in Fort William, Ontario

== Career statistics ==
=== Regular season and playoffs ===
			Regular season					Playoffs
Season	Team	League	GP	G	A	Pts	PIM	GP	G	A	Pts	PIM
1922–23	Fort William Dominion	TBJHL	7	6	4	10	—	—	—	—	—	—
1923–24	Fort William Dominion	TBJHL	—	—	—	—	—	—	—	—	—	—
1924–25	University of Manitoba	WJrHL	—	—	—	—	—	—	—	—	—	—
1924–25	University of Manitoba	M-Cup	—	—	—	—	—	5	8	0	8	15
1925–26	Fort William Forts	TBSHL	19	7	4	11	26	3	0	0	0	6
1926–27	Fort William Forts	TBSHL	19	25	12	37	38	2	1	0	1	2
1927–28	Fort William Forts	TBSHL	20	34	7	41	29	2	0	0	0	2
1928–29	Tulsa Oilers	AHA	39	22	11	33	26	4	3	0	3	4
1929–30	Chicago Black Hawks	NHL	41	14	16	30	18	2	0	1	1	4
1930–31	Chicago Black Hawks	NHL	43	15	14	29	36	9	1	3	4	11
1931–32	Chicago Black Hawks	NHL	48	12	13	25	28	2	0	0	0	2
1932–33	Chicago Black Hawks	NHL	48	12	14	26	30	—	—	—	—	—
1933–34	Chicago Black Hawks	NHL	37	5	9	14	15	8	1	0	1	0
1934–35	Chicago Black Hawks	NHL	48	12	18	30	33	2	0	0	0	2
1935–36	Chicago Black Hawks	NHL	47	4	8	12	20	1	0	0	0	0
1936–37	Chicago Black Hawks	NHL	15	0	2	2	0	—	—	—	—	—
1936–37	Cleveland Falcons	IAHL	24	7	8	15	13	—	—	—	—	—
1937–38	Montreal Maroons	NHL	21	2	4	6	0	—	—	—	—	—
1937–38	New Haven Eagles	IAHL	2	0	0	0	4	—	—	—	—	—
NHL totals			348	76	98	174	180	24	2	4	6	19

== Awards and achievements ==
- Stanley Cup Championship (1934)
