= 1926–27 AHA season =

- League: American Hockey Association
- Sport: Ice hockey
- Number of games: 40*
- Number of teams: 6

Regular season
- Season champions: Duluth Hornets
- Top scorer: Cecil Browne (Winnipeg)

Postseason
- Champions: Duluth Hornets
- Runners-up: Minneapolis Millers

Seasons
- 1927–28 →

The 1926–27 AHA season was the inaugural season for the American Hockey Association. Five franchises who had played the previous year in the Central Hockey League were joined by a new sixth member, the Chicago Cardinals.

== Schedule and playoffs ==
The teams were scheduled to play 40 games with 8 coming against each of their five opponents. The top three teams by points would qualify for the postseason with the regular season champion receiving a bye into the final round.

=== Detroit Greyhounds ===
Due to their expected home rink still being under construction at the start of the season, the Detroit Greyhounds forfeited their first four home games. In mid-December, with delays still plaguing the Greyhounds' rink, the team withdrew from the league. The league rearranged the schedule on the fly and ended up with a slight imbalance in games played by the end of the season, however, the difference in games did not affect the final standings.

== Regular season ==
	GP	W	L	T	Pts	GF	GA
Duluth Hornets	38	20	10	8	48	90	45
Minneapolis Millers	38	17	11	10	44	60	51
Winnipeg Maroons	38	19	14	5	43	83	77
St. Paul Saints	37	17	15	5	39	46	67
Chicago Cardinals / Americans	37	11	24	2	24	52	73
Detroit Greyhounds ^{†}	10	0	10	0	0	5	22

† Detroit played 6 games and forfeited 4 due to a lack of ice before withdrawing from the league.

== Scoring leaders ==
Note: GP = Games played; G = Goals; A = Assists; Pts = Points; PIM = Penalty minutes

Player	Team	GP	G	A	Pts	PIM
Cecil Browne	Winnipeg Maroons	35	24	6	30	84
Herbie Lewis	Duluth Hornets	37	18	6	24	52
Cooney Weiland	Minneapolis Millers	36	21	2	23	30
Art Somers	Winnipeg Maroons	32	11	10	21	73
Bill Borland	Winnipeg Maroons	33	9	11	20	85
Mike Goodman	Duluth Hornets	38	15	4	19	6
Happy Lessard	Detroit / Chicago	32	12	6	18	21
Moose Jamieson	Duluth Hornets	38	10	7	17	124
Vic Desjardins	St. Paul Saints	34	13	4	17	30
Barney Stanley	Winnipeg Maroons	35	8	8	16	78
Ken Dunfield	Duluth Hornets	37	12	4	16	6
Leo Lafrance	Duluth Hornets	37	12	4	16	41

== Playoff ==
Semifinals; March 24–29							Championship; April 2–6
							1	Duluth Hornets	3	1	1	-	-
2	Minneapolis Millers	2	4	2	-	-	2	Minneapolis Millers	0	0	0	-	-
3	Winnipeg Maroons	0	2	1	-	-
