= Rube Brandow =

Canadian ice hockey player (1898–1932)

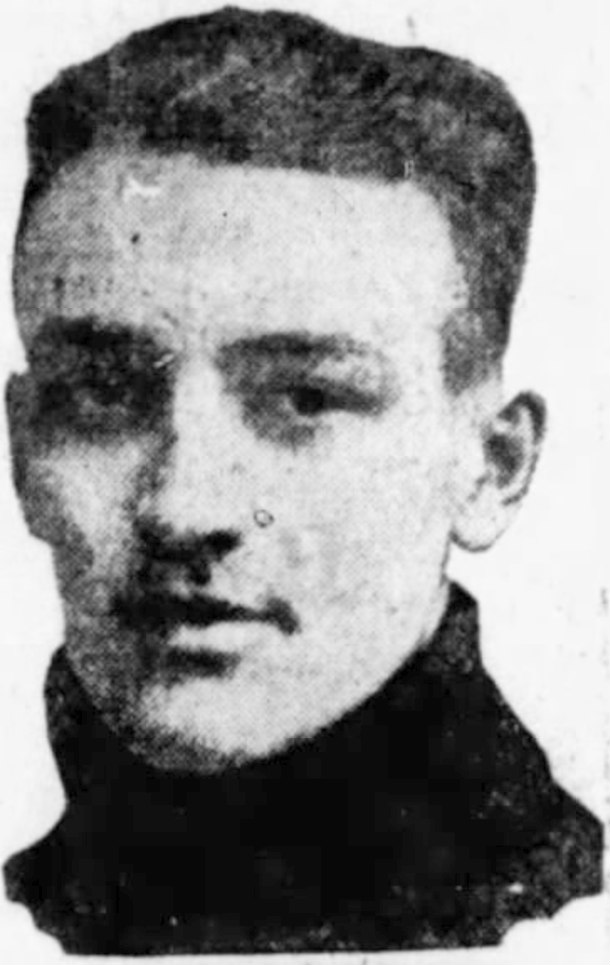
- Brandow c. 1922
- Born: October 16, 1898 Selkirk, Manitoba, Canada
- Died: November 20, 1932 (aged 34) Los Angeles County, California, U.S.
- Height: 5 ft 9 in (175 cm)
- Weight: 160 lb (73 kg; 11 st 6 lb)
- Position: Defence
- Shot: Right
- Played for: Calgary Tigers; Edmonton Eskimos; Saskatoon Crescents; Duluth Hornets
- Playing career: 1918–1930

Willis Reuben Brandow (October 16, 1898 – November 20, 1932) was a Canadian professional ice hockey player. He played with the Calgary Tigers, Edmonton Eskimos and Saskatoon Crescents of the Western Canada Hockey League. He also played with the Winnipeg Selkirks in his home province, and later the Duluth Hornets of the American Hockey Association. He later coached Wisconsin Badgers men's ice hockey program from 1926–27. In 1932, he died in a car accident.
