= Detroit Greyhounds =

- City: Detroit, Michigan
- League: American Hockey Association
- Operated: 1919–1926
- Colors: red, white

Franchise history
- 1919–1926: Sault Ste. Marie Greyhounds
- 1926: Detroit Greyhounds

The Detroit Greyhounds were a professional ice hockey team in Detroit, Michigan. They were a member of the American Hockey Association in 1926 but were only able to play just 6 games before suspending operations.

== History ==
Originally formed in 1919 as the Sault Ste. Marie Greyhounds, the team suffered from financial difficulties in the mid-1920s. After having to curtail their 1925–26 season, the franchise relocated to Detroit and retained their moniker. While they began as an amateur club, they switched to professional hockey and became founding members of the American Hockey Association. Detroit played its first 6 games that year on the road but had to forfeit 4 others as their home rink was still under construction. By December 13, with the rink still not close to being finished, the Greyhounds withdrew from the league for the remainder of the year. While they had planned to return once their arena was ready the following year, the existence of the Detroit Cougars and the appearance of the Detroit Olympics rendered the Greyhounds unnecessary and the team was allowed to quietly fade into history.

== Year-by-year results ==
Season	W	L	T	Pts	Finish	Coach(es)	Postseason
1926–27	10	0	10	0	withdrew	George McNamara	—
