= 1919 Allan Cup =

Canadian senior ice hockey championship

The Allan Cup trophy

The 1919 Allan Cup was the Canadian senior ice hockey championship for the 1918–19 season.

The series was played in Toronto, Ontario between the Hamilton Tigers and the Winnipeg Selkirks. The Tigers won the Allan Cup for the first and only time. The team played in the 1931 and 1946 finals, but lost both times.

== Final ==
- Hamilton Tigers 6 Selkirk 1
- Selkirk 5 Hamilton Tigers 1

Hamilton Tigers beat Selkirk on goals differential (7-6).
