= Duluth Hornets =

Amateur and professional ice hockey team

- City: Duluth, Minnesota
- League: United States Amateur Hockey Association (USAHA); Central Hockey League (CHL); American Hockey Association (AHA)
- Operated: 1914–1933
- Home arena: Duluth Curling and Skating Club (1914–1924); Duluth Amphitheater (1924–1932); The Alaskan Ice Palace (1932–1933)
- Colors: blue, orange

Franchise history
- 1914–1923: Duluth Hockey Club
- 1923–1924: Duluth Rangers
- 1924–1932: Duluth Hornets
- 1932–1933: Wichita Blue Jays
- 1933: Wichita Vikings

Championships
- Playoff championships: 1927

The Duluth Hornets were an amateur and professional ice hockey team in Duluth, Minnesota.

== History ==
=== Amateur ===
In 1914, in order to compete against several string amateur teams from Michigan and Canada, Joe Linder formed the Duluth Hockey Club. The team played on natural surfaces in the early days but still managed to be competitive. In 1920, Gordon Hegart took over control of the team and helped it secure a place in the United States Amateur Hockey Association, the top amateur league in the country. The Hornets slowly built themselves into a respectable club but by 1925 the USAHA was splintering. Duluth helped to form a new amateur league the following year, the Central Hockey League, and finished second in the standings.

=== Professional ===
The CHL was dissolved in 1926 and all but one of the teams banded together to form the American Hockey Association. Now led by Dick Carroll, the Hornets won the inaugural league championship and nearly repeated as champions the following season. Carroll left in 1928 and the team was unable to sustain the same level of completion without him. It wasn't until Johnny Mitchell took over as player / coach in 1932 that the Hornets managed to make another finals appearance. Unfortunately, by that time the team's finances were jeopardizing its future. In the midst of the Great Depression, their already precarious position was made even worse when the Duluth Natives of the Central Hockey League hit the ice for the 1932–33 season. The Hornets were able to survive in the first half of the year but, during the mid-season break, they relocated to Wichita, Kansas.

=== Fate ===
The Wichita Blue Jays did not fare well in the second half of the season and finished in last place. The team was renamed 'Vikings' for the following year but disbanded just 3 games into the season. The Natives, who had helped displace the Hornets, fared even worse and couldn't even last one season before suspending operations. The name 'Duluth Hornets' was revived by the two other teams in later years but neither lasted more than a season.

== Year-by-year results ==
=== USAHA ===
| Season | GP | W | L | T | Pts | Finish | Coach(es) | Postseason |
|---|---|---|---|---|---|---|---|---|
| 1920–21 | 8 | 1 | 7 | 0 | 2 | 3rd in group | Gordon Hegart | missed |
| 1921–22 | 12 | 4 | 8 | 0 | 8 | 4th in group | Gordon Hegart | missed |
| 1922–23 | 20 | 8 | 12 | 0 | 16 | 5th in group | Gordon Hegart | missed |
| 1923–24 | 20 | 6 | 14 | 0 | 12 | 5th in group | Gordon Hegart | missed |
| 1924–25 ^{†} | 20 | 11 | 8 | 1 | 2 | 2nd in group | Gordon Hegart | missed |
| 1924–25 ^{†} | 20 | 6 | 12 | 2 | 14 | 6th in group | Gordon Hegart | missed |

† regular season play was divided into two halves.

=== CHL ===
| Season | GP | W | L | T | Pts | Finish | Coach(es) | Postseason |
|---|---|---|---|---|---|---|---|---|
| 1925–26 | 40 | 18 | 14 | 8 | 44 | 2nd | Dick Carroll | none |

=== AHA ===
| Season | GP | W | L | T | Pts | Finish | Coach(es) | Postseason |
|---|---|---|---|---|---|---|---|---|
| 1926–27 | 38 | 20 | 10 | 8 | 48 | 1st | Dick Carroll | Won Championship |
| 1927–28 | 40 | 18 | 9 | 13 | 49 | 1st | Dick Carroll | Lost in Finals |
| 1928–29 | 40 | 15 | 21 | 14 | 34 | 5th | Shorty Green | missed |
| 1929–30 | 48 | 18 | 13 | 17 | 53 | 2nd | Shorty Green | Lost in Semifinals |
| 1930–31 | 48 | 28 | 19 | 1 | 56 | 2nd | Shorty Green | Lost in Semifinals |
| 1931–32 | 48 | 21 | 24 | 3 | 42 | 3rd | Johnny Mitchell | Lost in Finals |
| 1932–33 ^{‡} | 42 | 17 | 24 | 1 | 34 | 4th | Mike Goodman | missed |
| 1933–34 ^{¿} | 3 | 0 | 3 | 0 | 0 | withdrew | J. Vernon Banks | — |

‡ Second half of the season played in Wichita as the 'Blue Jays'.
¿ Played as the 'Wichita Vikings'; all three games were not counted in the standings after the team disbanded.

== Notable players ==
- Ernie Anderson
- Lloyd Andrews
- Edmond Bouchard
- Rube Brandow
- Bernie Brophy
- Bobby Burns
- Bob Davis
- Gus Forslund
- Dutch Gainor
- Red Green
- Shorty Green
- Haldor Halderson
- Fern Headley
- Vic Hoffinger
- Bill Hutton
- Bill Kendall (ice hockey)
- Leo Lafrance
- Charlie Langlois
- Jack Leswick
- Herbie Lewis
- Johnny Mitchell
- John Morrison
- Laurie Scott
- Alf Skinner
- Billy Stuart
- Joe Thorsteinson
- Vern Turner
- Burr Williams
- Cully Wilson
