= Central Hockey League (1925–1926) =

Former minor professional hockey league

- Countries: United States; Canada
- Founded: 1925
- Folded: 1926

The Central Hockey League (sometimes called the 'Central Amateur Hockey Association') was an amateur ice hockey league that was played by teams in Minnesota and Canada for one season.

== History ==
The United States Amateur Hockey Association, which had operated since the end of World War I, struggled through several years and finally dissolved in 1925. Three surviving teams from Minnesota: the Duluth Hornets, Eveleth-Hibbing Rangers and St. Paul Saints, were joined by a fourth team, the Minneapolis Millers as well as two teams from Canada: the Sault Ste. Marie Greyhounds and the Winnipeg Maroons to form a new league. The schedule was slated for 40 games with each team playing the others eight times during the season. Sault Ste. Marie soon found itself trailing in the standings but the club had an even bigger problem. As it was the team that was furthest away from all the other clubs, Sault Ste. Marie had a higher operating cost just with the travel times and the team got into financial difficulties before season's end. Sault Ste. Marie suspended operations with 6 games left on their schedule, leaving the league as a 5-team circuit. Minneapolis, who had played its full schedule, had the best record at the end of the season. Their lead was such that, even if the other teams had won all of their cancelled matches against the Greyhounds, Minneapolis would have still won the title.

After the season, four of the remaining teams decided to switch from amateur to professional hockey and dissolved the league. In its place, they became founding members of the Central Hockey Association. Eveleth-Hibbing decided against turning professional and became an independent team.

== Standings ==
Team	GP	W	L	T	Pts	GF	GA
Minneapolis Millers	40	22	10	8	50	82	62
Duluth Hornets	40	18	14	8	44	70	58
Eveleth-Hibbing Rangers	38	15	16	7	37	63	66
Winnipeg Maroons	38	14	15	9	37	76	82
St. Paul Saints	38	15	17	6	36	78	70
Sault Ste. Marie Greyhounds	32	8	20	4	20	69	100
