= Oklahoma City Warriors (ice hockey) =

- City: Oklahoma City, Oklahoma
- League: American Hockey Association
- Operated: 1933–1936
- Home arena: Oklahoma Coliseum
- Colors: red, blue

Franchise history
- 1933–1936: Oklahoma City Warriors
- 1936: Minneapolis Warriors

The Oklahoma City Warriors were a professional ice hockey team. Based in Oklahoma City, they operated within the American Hockey Association for three seasons before folding due to financial difficulties.

== History ==
In 1933, Noel Lyons purchased the rights to start a franchise in Oklahoma City from the American Hockey Association. The team debuted in November of that year, playing out of the second Oklahoma Coliseum (the first was destroyed by fire in 1930). The team was unsuccessful in its first season, losing nearly twice as many games as they won. The Warriors changed from a red and white color scheme to green and white for the start of the second season but the new look did not bring about any changes on the ice.

Entering the team's third season, Lyon's sold the club to Harry E. Turner who would in turn transfer the club to Dutch Seebold during the year. That season saw the team finally produce a decent season but, in the midst of the Great Depression, the team was very short on cash. With seven games left on its schedule, Seebold sold the club to Pete Mitchell, the Warriors' player/coach. He moved the team to Minneapolis on March 12 but the change in locales was unable to save the franchise and the Warriors disbanded after the year.

== Season-by-season results ==
=== AHA ===
Season	GP	W	L	T	Pts	Finish	Coach(es)	Postseason
1933–34	48	16	30	2	32	4th	Dick Carroll	missed
1934–35	48	15	28	5	30	4th	Bobby Burns	missed
1935–36	48	21	22	5	42	T–3rd	Pete Mitchell	missed
Total	144	52	80	12	.403			
