= 1928–29 AHA season =

- League: American Hockey Association
- Sport: Ice hockey
- Number of games: 40
- Number of teams: 6

Regular season
- Season champions: Tulsa Oilers
- Top scorer: Tom Cook (Tulsa)

Postseason
- Champions: Tulsa Oilers
- Runners-up: Minneapolis Millers

Seasons
- ← 1927–28 1929–30 →

The 1928–29 AHA season was the third season for the American Hockey Association.

== Schedule and playoffs ==
All six teams played their conference opponents 8 times each.

=== Expansion and relocation ===
Due in large part to their distance from the other league members, W. J. Holmes sold the Winnipeg Maroons to Patrick brothers who then moved the team to St. Louis. Continuing the league's movement southward, the AHA placed its first expansion franchise in Tulsa, Oklahoma, hoping to take advantage of the soon-to-be-completed Tulsa Coliseum.

== Regular season ==
| | GP | W | L | T | Pts | GF | GA |
|---|---|---|---|---|---|---|---|
| Tulsa Oilers | 40 | 23 | 9 | 8 | 54 | 125 | 63 |
| Minneapolis Millers | 40 | 18 | 12 | 10 | 46 | 77 | 51 |
| St. Paul Saints | 40 | 20 | 17 | 3 | 43 | 88 | 98 |
| Kansas City Pla-Mors | 40 | 17 | 16 | 7 | 41 | 66 | 75 |
| Duluth Hornets | 40 | 15 | 21 | 4 | 34 | 66 | 70 |
| St. Louis Flyers | 40 | 10 | 28 | 2 | 22 | 73 | 138 |

== Scoring leaders ==
Note: GP = Games played; G = Goals; A = Assists; Pts = Points; PIM = Penalty minutes

| Player | Team | GP | G | A | Pts | PIM |
|---|---|---|---|---|---|---|
| Tom Cook | Tulsa Oilers | 39 | 22 | 11 | 33 | 26 |
| Duke Keats | Tulsa Oilers | 38 | 22 | 11 | 33 | 18 |
| Frank Sheppard | Tulsa Oilers | 40 | 21 | 10 | 31 | 31 |
| Leo Lafrance | Tulsa Oilers | 40 | 19 | 7 | 26 | 33 |
| Vic Desjardins | St. Paul Saints | 39 | 16 | 10 | 26 | 48 |
| Teddy Graham | Tulsa Oilers | 34 | 10 | 15 | 25 | 38 |
| Fern Headley | St. Louis Flyers | 40 | 14 | 11 | 25 | 54 |
| Frank Ingram | St. Paul Saints | 40 | 20 | 4 | 24 | 69 |
| Billy Stuart | Minneapolis Millers | 39 | 17 | 6 | 23 | 87 |
| Stewart Adams | Minneapolis Millers | 40 | 11 | 8 | 19 | 41 |

== Playoff ==
| Semifinals; March 20–25 | | | | | | | | Championship; March 27–April 2 |
| | | | | | | | | 1 | Tulsa Oilers | 1 | 1 | 3 | 3 | 8 |
| 2 | Minneapolis Millers | 3 | 0 | 0 | 0 | - | - | 2 | Minneapolis Millers | 0 | 1 | 3 | 1 | 5 |
| 3 | St. Paul Saints | 1 | 2 | 2 | 2 | - | - |

Note: the semifinal was a best-of-five series while the final was a four-game total-goal series.
