= Tulsa Oilers (1928–1951) =

- City: Tulsa, Oklahoma
- League: American Hockey Association; United States Hockey League
- Operated: 1928–1942 (AHA); 1945–1951 (USHL)
- Home arena: Tulsa Coliseum
- Colors: black, orange

Franchise history
- 1928–1932: Tulsa Oilers
- 1932–1933: St. Paul Greyhounds
- 1933: Tulsa Oilers
- 1933–1934: Tulsa Indians
- 1934–1942: Tulsa Oilers
- 1945–1951: Tulsa Oilers

Championships
- Playoff championships: 1929, 1931

The Tulsa Oilers were a professional ice hockey team. Based in Tulsa, Oklahoma, they operated within the American Hockey Association for almost 15 years and were later members of the United States Hockey League for the circuit's entire existence.

== History ==
Walter Whiteside brought professional ice hockey to Tulsa in 1928 when he founded the Oilers. The new franchise was led by Dick Carroll and sported former and future NHLers like Duke Keats, Tom Cook and Ted Graham. Tulsa won the league championship twice in its first three seasons and firmly established itself as the premier team in the league. Carroll departed after the third year and the team sank to the bottom of the standings.

Prior to the team's fifth season, the franchise was moved north to Saint Paul, Minnesota, hoping to save money on travel by being nearer to the other AHA cubs. While the operating costs were reduced, the team was in direct competition with the St. Paul Saints, who had long been established in the city. After the first half of the season, the team moved back to Tulsa and finished out the year as the Oilers once more. The team was then renamed as the 'Tulsa Indians' for the 1933–34 season but, once again, they reverted to being the Tulsa Oilers before the year was complete.

The fans saw fit not to punish the Oilers for leaving during the height of the Great Depression and continued to support the team. The Oilers saw less success in the late 20s than they had at the start of the decade but the team was still able to make two more appearance in the league finals. In 1942 the American Hockey Association suspended operations due to World War II and the Oilers were mothballed for the duration. After the war, the United States Hockey League was created to replace the AHA and Tulsa returned as one of the founding members. The Oilers were one of the top postseason teams in the league, making the finals three times in six years. Unfortunately, the by the early 50s the league was fracturing and despite the possibility of continuing, the USHL was disbanded after the summer meeting in 1951.

== Season-by-season results ==
=== AHA ===
Season	GP	W	L	T	Pts	Finish	Coach(es)	Postseason
1928–29	40	23	9	8	54	1st	Dick Carroll	Won Championship
1929–30	48	18	14	16	52	3rd	Dick Carroll	Lost in Finals
1930–31	48	30	15	3	60	1st	Dick Carroll	Won Championship
1931–32	48	16	28	4	32	5th	Shorty Green	missed
1932–33	45	21	23	1	42	3rd	Kay Iverson / Gerry Lowrey / Helge Bostrom / Yip Foster	Lost in Semifinal
1933–34	48	23	25	0	46	3rd	Ralph Taylor / Vic Desjardins	Lost in Semifinal
1934–35	48	23	21	4	46	T–2nd	Vic Desjardins	Lost in Finals
1935–36	48	21	27	0	42	T–3rd	?	Lost in Semifinal
1936–37	48	17	24	7	34	6th	Henry Maracle / Fred Gordon	missed
1937–38	48	22	21	5	44	4th	Fred Gordon	Lost in Semifinal
1938–39	50	25	23	2	50	3rd	Fred Gordon	Lost in Final
1939–40	46	16	30	0	32	6th	Fred Gordon	missed
1940–41	48	14	34	0	28	6th	Pete Palangio / Connie King / Andy Bellemer	missed
1941–42	50	13	34	3	29	3rd in South	Guy Patrick	Lost in Quarterfinal
Total	663	282	328	53	.465			2 Championships

=== USHL ===
Season	GP	W	L	T	Pts	Finish	Coach(es)	Postseason
1945–46	56	27	25	4	58	3rd	Gus Marker	Lost in Final
1946–47	60	17	31	12	46	3rd in Southern	Gus Marker	Lost in Quarterfinal
1947–48	66	23	34	9	55	3rd in Southern	Clint Smith	Lost in Quarterfinal
1948–49	66	33	23	10	76	1st in Southern	Jack Riley	Lost in Final
1949–50	70	25	33	12	62	5th	?	missed
1950–51	64	30	31	3	63	4th	Bud Poile	Lost in Final
Total	382	155	177	50	.471			
