= 1929–30 AHA season =

- League: American Hockey Association
- Sport: Ice hockey
- Number of games: 48
- Number of teams: 6

Regular season
- Season champions: Kansas City Pla-Mors
- Top scorer: Larry Goyer (St. Louis)

Postseason
- Champions: Kansas City Pla-Mors
- Runners-up: Tulsa Oilers

Seasons
- ← 1928–29 1930–31 →

The 1929–30 AHA season was the fourth season for the American Hockey Association.

== Schedule and playoffs ==
The schedule was increased from the previous season of 40 games to 48 games.

== Regular season ==
	GP	W	L	T	Pts	GF	GA
Kansas City Pla-Mors	48	21	13	14	56	75	65
Duluth Hornets	48	18	13	17	53	86	83
Tulsa Oilers	48	18	14	16	52	94	79
St. Paul Saints	48	18	16	14	50	93	90
Minneapolis Millers	48	15	21	12	42	82	82
St. Louis Flyers	48	12	25	11	35	98	129

== Scoring leaders ==
Note: GP = Games played; G = Goals; A = Assists; Pts = Points; PIM = Penalty minutes

Player	Team	GP	G	A	Pts	PIM
Larry Goyer	St. Louis Flyers	48	28	10	38	35
Vic Desjardins	St. Paul Saints	45	25	10	35	49
Corbett Denneny	Minneapolis Millers	48	27	7	34	22
Laurie Scott	Duluth Hornets	48	19	13	32	45
Garnet Campbell	Kansas City Pla-Mors	46	15	10	25	62
Billy Hill	St. Louis Flyers	46	12	10	22	42
Harry Cameron	St. Louis Flyers	48	14	7	21	34
Gus Marker	Tulsa Oilers	48	13	7	20	31
Billy Stuart	Minneapolis Millers	48	10	10	20	70
Elwin Romnes	St. Paul Saints	38	15	4	19	26
Shrimp McPherson	Tulsa Oilers	29	14	5	19	20
Ron Moffatt	Tulsa Oilers	48	14	5	19	45

== Playoff ==
Semifinals; March 24–30							Championship; April 1–7
							1	Kansas City Pla-Mors	1	4	0	2	1	8
2	Duluth Hornets	2	0	0	1	-	3	Tulsa Oilers	1	0	2	1	2	6
3	Tulsa Oilers	0	1*	0*	2	-

Note: the semifinal was a best-of-three series that was extended to four games due to a tie. The final was a five-game total-goal series.
