= Minneapolis Millers (AHA) =

The Minneapolis Millers were a minor league professional ice hockey team based in Minneapolis, Minnesota, at the Minneapolis Arena. The Millers originated in the Central Hockey League as a semi-professional team for the 1925–1926 season. The Millers, along with other CHL teams, moved to the American Hockey Association and played there from 1926 to 1931. The Millers then switched to a revived Central Hockey League based locally in Minnesota. After the CHL's demise, the Millers rejoined the AHA, where they played from 1935 to 1942. The team went on hiatus during World War II and was revived in the United States Hockey League from 1945 to 1950. Lyle Wright managed from Millers from 1928 to 1931 and 1933 to 1950.
