= List of Chicago Blackhawks players =

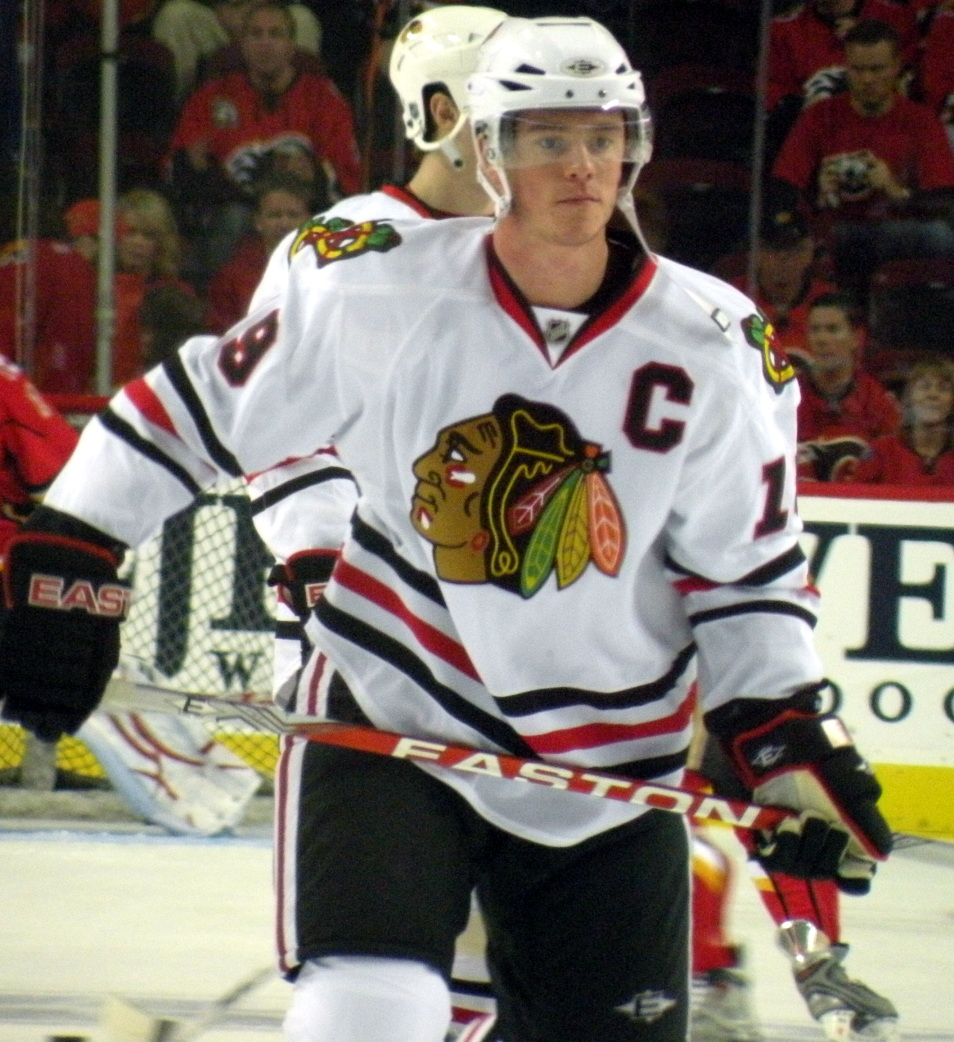
Jonathan Toews was captain of the Blackhawks from 2008 to 2023.

The Chicago Blackhawks are a professional ice hockey team based in Chicago, Illinois. They are members of the Central Division of the Western Conference in the National Hockey League (NHL). The club was founded in 1926 as one of the league's first American franchises, joining in the same year as the New York Rangers and the Detroit Red Wings (then known as the Detroit Cougars). Owing to the Blackhawks' long history, they are considered one of the NHL's "Original Six" teams—a term reserved for the six teams that comprised the NHL from the 1942–43 season until the league expanded in 1967. As of October 9, 2020, 955 players have played at least one game for the franchise, either in the NHL regular season or in the playoffs.

The Blackhawks, known as the Black Hawks from their inception until 1986, have won the Stanley Cup six times in their 83-year history. Charlie Gardiner, the team's goaltender for its first Stanley Cup win in 1934, became the first European-born captain—and still the only goaltender captain—to win the Stanley Cup. Johnny Gottselig became the second European-born captain to do so when the team won its second championship in 1938. Stan Mikita is the franchise leader in assists (926) and points (1467), and Bobby Hull is the leader in goals (604). Chris Chelios is the franchise leader in penalty minutes (1495). Goaltender Tony Esposito is the club's all-time leader in wins (418) and shutouts (74).

The franchise has had 34 players selected as captains. Each NHL team may select a captain, who has the "sole privilege of discussing with the referee any questions relating to interpretation of rules which may arise during the progress of a game". Captains are required to wear the letter "C" on their uniform for identification, which is 3 inches (7.6 cm) in height. Dick Irvin was named the first captain in 1926. The current captain, Jonathan Toews, was the third-youngest captain in NHL history at the time of his selection.

== Key ==
* Won Stanley Cup while with the Blackhawks.
† Appeared in a Blackhawks game during the 2024–25 season.

All players
Nat	Nationality
(Austria)	Austria
(Belarus)	Belarus
(Canada)	Canada
(Czech Republic)	Czech Republic
(Denmark)	Denmark
(Finland)	Finland
(France)	France
(Germany)	Germany

All players
Nat	Nationality
(Italy)	Italy
(Poland)	Poland
(Russia)	Russia
(Slovakia)	Slovakia
(Sweden)	Sweden
(Switzerland)	Switzerland
(Soviet Union)	Soviet Union
(United Kingdom)	United Kingdom
(United States)	United States

Goaltenders
GP	Games played
W	Wins
L	Losses
T	Ties
OTL	Overtime loss
SO	Shutouts
GAA	Goals against average
SV%^{[a]}	Save percentage

Skaters
Pos	Position
C	Center
D	Defenseman
LW	Left wing
RW	Right wing
GP	Games played
G	Goals
A	Assists
P	Points
PIM	Penalty minutes

== Goaltenders ==
Name	Nat	Jersey no.	Seasons^{[b]}	Regular season								Playoffs							Notes
Name	Nat	Jersey no.	Seasons^{[b]}	GP	W	L	T	OTL	SO	GAA	SV%	GP	W	L	T	SO	GAA	SV%	Notes
Almas, Ralph "Red"	(Canada)	1	1950–1951	1	0	1	0	—	0	5.00	—	—	—	—	—	—	—	—	
Anderson, Craig	(United States)	31	2002–2006	56	12	29	2	4	2	3.19	.892	—	—	—	—	—	—	—	
Bannerman, Murray	(Canada)	30	1980–1987	288	116	125	33	—	8	3.84	.880	40	20	18	—	0	4.27	.873	
Bassen, Hank	(Canada)	1	1954–1956	33	6	18	9	—	1	3.12	—	—	—	—	—	—	—	—	
Belfour, Ed	(Canada)	1, 30, 31	1988–1997	415	201	138	56	—	30	2.65	.903	68	35	28	—	3	2.50	.912	
Berube, Jean-Francois	(Canada)	34	2017–2018	13	3	6	—	1	0	3.78	.894	—	—	—	—	—	—	—	
Bibeault, Paul	(Canada)	1	1946–1947	41	13	25	3	—	1	4.15	—	—	—	—	—	—	—	—	
Boucher, Brian	(United States)	31	2006–2007	15	1	10	—	3	1	3.27	.884	—	—	—	—	—	—	—	
Brimsek, Frank	(United States)	1	1949–1950	70	22	38	10	—	5	3.49	—	—	—	—	—	—	—	—	
Brown, Ken	(Canada)	30	1970–1971	1	0	0	0	—	0	3.37	.929	—	—	—	—	—	—	—	
Caron, Sebastien	(Canada)	30	2006–2007	1	1	0	0	—	0	1.00	.960	—	—	—	—	—	—	—	
Chabot, Lorne	(Canada)	1	1934–1935	48	26	17	5	—	8	1.80	—	2	0	1	1	1	0.48	—	
Chevrier, Alain	(Canada)	30	1988–1990	66	29	25	5	—	0	3.88	.863	16	9	7	—	0	2.61	.909	
Clifford, Chris	(Canada)	34, 50	1984–1989	2	0	0	0	—	0	0.00	1.000	—	—	—	—	—	—	—	
Cloutier, Jacques	(Canada)	31	1989–1991	53	20	18	2	—	2	3.16	.877	4	0	2	—	0	2.74	.893	
Commesso, Drew †	(United States)	33	2024–present	2	0	1	–	0	0	3.36	.846	—	—	—	—	—	—	—	
Crawford, Corey *	(Canada)	50	2005–2020	488	260	162	—	53	26	2.45	.918	96	52	42	—	5	2.38	.918	SC 2013, 2015
Cude, Wilf	(United Kingdom)	1	1931–1932	1	0	1	0	—	0	13.17	—	—	—	—	—	—	—	—	
Darling, Scott *	(United States)	33	2014–2017	75	39	17	—	9	4	2.37	.923	5	3	1	—	0	2.22	.936	SC 2015
DeJordy, Denis *	(Canada)	1, 30	1963–1969	199	86	69	35	—	13	2.75	.914	18	6	9	—	0	3.49	.899	SC 1961
Delia, Collin	(United States)	60	2018–2022	32	9	12	—	5	0	3.68	.904	—	—	—	—	—	—	—	
Desjardins, Gerry	(Canada)	1, 30	1969–1972	32	17	8	5	—	0	2.58	.916	1	1	0	—	0	4.98	.853	
Dickie, Bill	(Canada)	1	1941–1942	1	1	0	0	—	0	3.00	—	—	—	—	—	—	—	—	
Dryden, Dave	(Canada)	1, 30	1965–1969	68	24	23	4	—	4	3.21	.902	1	0	0	—	0	0.00	1.000	
Dumas, Michel	(Canada)	1, 30	1974–1977	8	2	1	2	—	0	3.97	.868	1	0	0	—	0	3.24	.889	
Emery, Ray *	(Canada)	30	2011–2013	55	32	10	—	4	3	2.47	.908	—	—	—	—	—	—	—	SC 2013
Esposito, Tony	(Canada)	1, 35	1969–1983	873	418	302	148	—	74	2.93	.906	99	45	53	—	6	3.09	.903	#35 Retired by Blackhawks
Fitzpatrick, Mark	(Canada)	30	1998–1999	27	6	8	6	—	0	2.74	.906	—	—	—	—	—	—	—	
Fleury, Marc-Andre	(Canada)	29	2021–2022	45	19	21	—	5	4	2.95	.908	—	—	—	—	—	—	—	
Forsberg, Anton	(Sweden)	31	2017–2019	35	10	16	—	4	0	2.97	.908	—	—	—	—	—	—	—	
Foster, Scott	(Canada)	90	2017–2018	1	0	0	—	0	0	0.00	1.000	—	—	—	—	—	—	—	
Francis, Emile	(Canada)	1	1946–1948	73	25	42	6	—	1	3.93	—	—	—	—	—	—	—	—	
Frederick, Ray	(Canada)	1	1954–1955	5	0	4	1	—	0	4.40	—	—	—	—	—	—	—	—	
Gardiner, Bert	(Canada)	1	1942–1943	50	17	18	15	—	1	3.58	—	—	—	—	—	—	—	—	
Gardiner, Chuck *	(Canada)	1	1927–1934	316	112	151	52	—	42	2.02	—	21	12	6	3	5	1.43	—	SC 1934; Captain 1933–1934
Gelineau, Jack	(Canada)	1	1953–1954	2	0	2	0	—	0	9.00	—	—	—	—	—	—	—	—	
Glass, Jeff	(Canada)	30	2017–2018	15	3	7	—	3	0	3.36	.898	—	—	—	—	—	—	—	
Goodman, Paul *	(Canada)	1	1937–1941	52	23	20	9	—	6	2.17	—	3	0	3	—	0	3.22	—	SC 1938
Hackett, Jeff	(Canada)	29, 31	1993–1998	173	63	75	25	—	14	2.45	.913	9	2	5	—	0	4.31	.867	
Hall, Glenn *	(Canada)	1	1957–1967	618	276	229	107	—	51	2.60	.916	69	31	38	—	5	2.85	.913	SC 1961 #1 Retired By Blackhawks
Hasek, Dominik	(Czechoslovakia)	31, 34	1990–1992	25	13	4	2	—	1	2.58	.897	6	0	2	—	0	2.92	.899	
Henry, Jim	(Canada)	1	1948–1949	60	21	31	8	—	0	3.52	—	—	—	—	—	—	—	—	
Highton, Hec	(Canada)	1	1943–1944	24	10	14	0	—	0	4.50	—	—	—	—	—	—	—	—	
Huet, Cristobal *	(France)	38, 39	2008–2010	89	46	29	—	8	7	2.51	.902	4	1	2	—	0	2.80	.914	SC 2010
Hutton, Carter	(Canada)	33	2012–2013	1	0	1	-	0	0	3.06	.893	-	—	—	—	—	—	—	
Jackson, Doug	(Canada)	1	1947–1948	6	1	4	1	—	0	7.00	—	—	—	—	—	—	—	—	
Janecyk, Bob	(United States)	31	1983–1984	8	2	3	1	—	0	4.10	.882	—	—	—	—	—	—	—	
Johnston, Eddie	(Canada)	30	1977–1978	4	1	3	0	—	0	4.25	.850	—	—	—	—	—	—	—	
Karakas, Mike *	(United States)	1, 18	1935–1940; 1943–1946	331	114	165	52	—	28	2.90	—	23	11	12	—	3	3.01	—	SC 1938
Khabibulin, Nikolai	(Russia)	39, 53	2005–2009; 2013–2014	206	91	80	—	25	6	2.84	.902	15	8	6	—	0	2.93	.898	
Khudobin, Anton	(Russia)	31	2022–2023	1	0	1	–	0	0	6.00	.786	—	—	—	—	—	—	—	
Knight, Spencer †	(United States)	30	2024–present	15	5	8	–	2	0	3.18	.896	—	—	—	—	—	—	—	
Lalime, Patrick	(Canada)	40	2006–2008	44	20	18	—	3	2	2.89	.897	—	—	—	—	—	—	—	
Lamothe, Marc	(Canada)	31	1999–2000	2	1	1	0	—	0	5.16	.800	—	—	—	—	—	—	—	
Lankinen, Kevin	(Finland)	32	2020–2022	69	25	29	—	11	2	3.23	.901	—	—	—	—	—	—	—	
Larocque, Michel	(Canada)	30	2000–2001	3	0	2	0	—	0	3.55	.847	—	—	—	—	—	—	—	
LeBlanc, Ray	(United States)	50	1991–1992	1	1	0	0	—	0	1.00	.955	—	—	—	—	—	—	—	
Lehman, Hugh	(Canada)	1, 16	1926–1928	48	20	24	4	—	6	2.68	—	2	0	1	1	0	5.00	—	
Lehner, Robin	(Sweden)	40	2019–2020	33	16	10	—	5	0	3.01	.918	—	—	—	—	—	—	—	
Leighton, Michael	(Canada)	30,49	2002–2004; 2015–2016	43	8	21	10	—	3	2.93	.903	—	—	—	—	—	—	—	
LoPresti, Sam	(United States)	31	1940–1942	74	30	38	6	—	4	3.12	—	8	3	5	—	1	1.92	—	
Lumley, Harry	(Canada)	1	1950–1952	134	29	85	19	—	5	3.67	—	—	—	—	—	—	—	—	
Marois, Jean	(Canada)	1	1953–1954	2	0	2	0	—	0	5.50	—	—	—	—	—	—	—	—	
Mason, Bob	(United States)	31	1987–1988	41	13	18	8	—	0	4.16	.882	1	0	1	—	0	3.00	.903	
Meloche, Gilles	(Canada)	30	1970–1971	2	2	0	0	—	0	3.00	.917	—	—	—	—	—	—	—	
Millen, Greg	(Canada)	29	1989–1991	13	5	5	1	—	0	3.41	.879	14	6	6	—	0	3.92	.867	
Moore, Alfie *	(Canada)	1	1937–1938	—	—	—	—	—	—	—	—	1	1	0	—	1	1.00	—	SC 1938
Munro, Adam	(Canada)	30	2003–2004; 2005–2006	17	4	10	1	2	1	3.30	.887	—	—	—	—	—	—	—	
Mrazek, Petr †	(Czech Republic)	34	2022–present	128	38	72	—	9	1	3.34	.899	—	—	—	—	—	—	—	
Niemi, Antti *	(Finland)	31	2008–2010	42	27	8	—	5	7	2.32	.910	22	16	6	—	2	2.63	.910	SC 2010
Norris, Jack	(Canada)	30	1967–1969	10	3	3	0	—	1	4.42	.862	—	—	—	—	—	—	—	
Pang, Darren	(Canada)	34, 40	1984–1989	81	27	35	7	—	0	4.05	.882	6	1	3	—	0	4.35	.886	
Passmore, Steve	(Canada)	29, 37	1999–2000; 2000–2004	81	27	35	10	—	1	2.74	.897	3	0	2	—	0	2.62	.903	
Pelletier, Marcel	(Canada)	1	1950–1951	6	1	5	0	—	0	4.73	—	—	—	—	—	—	—	—	
Raanta, Antti	(Finland)	31	2013–2015	39	20	9	—	5	3	2.41	.912	—	—	—	—	—	—	—	
Roberts, Moe^{[c]}	(United States)	1	1951–1952	1	0	0	0	—	0	0.00	—	—	—	—	—	—	—	—	
Rollins, Al	(Canada)	1	1952–1957	308	81	171	56	—	17	3.03	.890	6	0	6	—	0	4.01	.883	
Sauve, Bob	(Canada)	31, 40	1985–1987	84	38	32	7	—	1	3.76	—	7	3	4	—	0	2.54	—	
Simpson, Kent	(Canada)	40	2013–2014	1	0	0	—	0	0	6.00	.714	—	—	—	—	—	—	—	
Skorodenski, Warren	(Canada)	1	1981–1987	32	12	11	4	—	2	3.35	.901	2	0	0	—	0	10.91	.786	
Smith, Gary	(Canada)	1	1971–1973	51	24	15	8	—	5	2.94	.899	4	1	2	—	1	2.59	.930	
Soderblom, Arvid †	(Sweden)	40	2021–present	83	17	50	–	11	0	3.50	.890	—	—	—	—	—	—	—	
Soucy, Christian	(Canada)	50	1993–1994	1	0	0	–	0	0	0.00	—	—	—	—	—	—	—	—	
Stalock, Alex	(United States)	32	2022–2023	27	9	15	—	2	2	3.01	.908	—	—	—	—	—	—	—	
Stauber, Jaxson	(United States)	30	2022–present	6	5	1	—	0	0	2.81	.911	—	—	—	—	—	—	—	
Stevenson, Doug	(Canada)	1	1944–1946	4	2	2	0	—	0	4.75	—	—	—	—	—	—	—	—	
Subban, Malcolm	(Canada)	30	2019–2021	17	6	8	—	1	2	3.20	.900	—	—	—	—	—	—		
Tallas, Rob	(Canada)	32	2000–2001	12	2	7	0	—	0	3.35	.868	—	—	—	—	—	—	—	
Terreri, Chris	(United States)	40	1996–1998	28	12	11	4	—	2	2.47	.904	2	0	0	—	0	4.11	.893	
Thibault, Jocelyn	(Canada)	41	1998–2004	321	137	142	37	—	28	2.63	.905	3	1	2	—	0	2.65	.909	
Trefilov, Andrei	(Russia)	29, 45	1997–1999	7	1	5	0	—	0	3.89	.873	—	—	—	—	—	—	—	
Turco, Marty	(Canada)	30	2010–2011	29	11	11	—	3	1	3.02	.897	—	—	—	—	—	—	—	
Underhill, Matt	(Canada)	40	2003–2004	1	0	1	0	—	0	3.95	.879	—	—	—	—	—	—	—	
Veisor, Mike	(Canada)	1	1973–1980	62	20	24	15	—	3	3.29	.902	3	0	2	—	0	4.74	.843	
Villemure, Gilles	(Canada)	1	1975–1977	21	2	11	6	—	0	4.61	.854	—	—	—	—	—	—	—	
Waite, Jimmy	(Canada)	29, 30, 36, 49, 60	1988–1993; 1994–1997	58	14	23	7	—	2	3.64	.860	—	—	—	—	—	—	—	
Ward, Cam	(Canada)	30	2018–2019	33	16	12	—	4	0	3.67	.897	—	—	—	—	—	—	—	
Wells, Dylan	(Canada)	31	2022–2023	1	0	0	—	0	0	3.00	.923	—	—	—	—	—	—	—	

== Skaters ==
Name	Nat	Pos	Seasons^{[b]}	Jersey no.	Regular season					Playoffs					Notes
Name	Nat	Pos	Seasons^{[b]}	Jersey no.	GP	G	A	P	PIM	GP	G	A	P	PI	Notes
Abbott, Spencer	(Canada)	LW	2016–2017	24	1	0	0	0	0	—	—	—	—	—	
Abel, Clarence "Taffy" *	(United States)	D	1929–1934	2	222	9	12	21	214	21	0	0	0	28	SC 1934
Abel, Sid	(Canada)	LW	1952–1954	19, 20, 21	42	5	4	9	10	1	0	0	0	0	
Adams, Craig	(Canada)	RW	2007–2009	28	71	4	8	12	46	—	—	—	—	—	
Adams, Kevyn	(United States)	C	2007–2008	17	27	0	2	2	13	—	—	—	—	—	
Adams, Stewart	(Canada)	LW	1929–1932	16	85	9	24	33	70	11	3	3	6	14	
Ahlin, Rudy	(United States)	LW	1937–1938	3	1	0	0	0	0	—	—	—	—	—	
Aitken, Johnathan	(Canada)	D	2003–2004	56	41	0	1	1	70	—	—	—	—	—	
Alexeev, Nikita	(Russia)	LW	2006–2007	34	15	2	0	2	0	—	—	—	—	—	2002||10||627||268||273||541||468||40||13||12||25||32||Captain 2000–2002
Allan, Nolan †	(United States)	RW	2024–present	42	43	1	7	8	16	—	—	—	—	—	7
Allen, George	(Canada)	LW	1939–1946	6	272	69	95	164	159	23	8	7	15	22	
Allison, Jamie	(Canada)	D	1998–2001	33, 38	142	4	8	12	217	—	—	—	—	—	
Amonte, Tony	(United States)	RW	1994–2002	10	627	268	273	541	468	40	13	12	25	32	Captain 2000–2002
Anderson, Joey †	(United States)	RW	2022–present	15	97	9	15	24	8	—	—	—	—	—	
Andrijevski, Alexander	(Belarus)	RW	1992–1993	56	1	0	0	0	0	—	—	—	—	—	
Angotti, Lou	(Canada)	C/RW	1965–1967; 1969–1973	6	370	51	96	147	118	58	8	8	16	15	
Anholt, Darrell	(Canada)	D	1983–1984	33	1	0	0	0	0	—	—	—	—	—	
Anisimov, Artem	(Russia)	C	2015–2019	15	291	77	78	155	78	11	3	0	3	2	
Arbour, Al *	(Canada)	D	1958–1961	2	180	6	17	23	188	18	1	2	3	32	SC 1961
Arbour, Ernest "Ty"	(Canada)	LW	1927–1931	8	160	21	20	41	100	11	2	0	2	6	Captain 1930–1931
Archambault, Michel	(Canada)	LW	1976–1977	27	3	0	0	0	0	—	—	—	—	—	
Arkhipov, Denis	(Russia)	C	2006–2007	19	79	10	17	27	54	—	—	—	—	—	
Arnason, Tyler	(United States)	C	2002–2006	39	245	57	82	139	80	3	0	0	0	0	
Ashworth, Frank	(Canada)	C	1946–1947	6	18	5	4	9	2	—	—	—	—	—	
Atcheynum, Blair	(Canada)	RW	1999–2001	15, 34	66	6	9	15	8	—	—	—	—	—	
Athanasiou, Andreas †	(Canada)	C	2022–present	89	117	23	27	50	41	—	—	—	—	—	
Aucoin, Adrian	(Canada)	D	2005–2007	33	92	5	17	22	88	—	—	—	—	—	Captain 2005–2007
Babando, Pete	(Canada)	LW	1950–1953	10	148	34	38	72	79	—	—	—	—	—	
Babchuk, Anton	(Russia)	D	2003–2006	8	22	2	5	7	18	—	—	—	—	—	
Backstrom, Ralph	(Canada)	C	1972–1973	14	16	6	3	9	2	16	5	6	11	0	
Bailey, Bob	(Canada)	RW	1957–1958	20	28	3	6	9	38	—	—	—	—	—	
Baldwin, Doug	(Canada)	D	1947–1948	3	5	0	0	0	2	—	—	—	—	—	
Balfour, Earl *	(Canada)	LW	1958–1961	20	208	16	16	32	30	22	0	2	2	2	SC 1961
Balfour, Murray *	(Canada)	RW	1959–1964	8	286	66	87	153	357	40	9	10	19	47	SC 1961
Bancroft, Steve	(Canada)	D	1992–1993	42	1	0	0	0	0	—	—	—	—	—	
Barinka, Michal	(Czech Republic)	D	2003–2006	42	34	0	2	2	26	—	—	—	—	—	
Barker, Cam	(Canada)	D	2005–2010	25	200	17	63	80	219	17	3	6	9	2	
Barkley, Doug	(Canada)	D	1957–1960	6, 19	6	0	0	0	2	—	—	—	—	—	
Barnaby, Matthew	(Canada)	RW	2005–2006	36	82	8	20	28	178	—	—	—	—	—	
Bartovic, Milan	(Slovakia)	RW	2005–2006	26	24	1	6	7	8	—	—	—	—	—	
Bassen, Bob	(Canada)	C	1988–1990	15, 22	55	5	13	18	70	11	1	1	2	36	
Baun, Kyle	(Canada)	RW	2015–2016	39	5	0	0	0	0	—	—	—	—	—	
Baumgartner, Nolan	(Canada)	D	2000–2001	38	8	0	0	0	6	—	—	—	—	—	
Beaudin, Nicolas	(Canada)	D	2019–2022	74	22	2	4	6	2	—	—	—	—	—	
Beauvillier, Anthony	(Canada)	C	2023	91	—	—	—	—	—	—	—	—	—	—	
Bedard, Connor †	(Canada)	C	2023–present	98	150	45	83	128	98	—	—	—	—	—	
Bedard, Jim	(Canada)	D	1949–1951	2, 21	22	1	1	2	8	—	—	—	—	—	
Bell, Mark	(Canada)	C/LW	2001–2006	28	339	72	79	151	454	5	0	0	0	8	
Bennett, Adam	(Canada)	D	1991–1993	47	21	0	2	2	20	—	—	—	—	—	
Bentley, Doug	(Canada)	LW	1939–1951	7, 14	545	217	314	531	215	23	9	8	17	16	Captain 1942–1944, 1949–1950
Bentley, Max	(Canada)	C	1940–1947	4, 5, 18	235	109	147	256	32	11	4	3	7	6	
Bentley, Reg	(Canada)	LW	1942–1943	14, 19	11	1	2	3	2	—	—	—	—	—	
Berard, Bryan	(United States)	D	2003–2004	3, 4	58	13	34	47	53	—	—	—	—	—	
Berezin, Sergei	(Russia)	LW	2002–2003	94	66	18	13	31	8	—	—	—	—	—	
Bergevin, Marc	(Canada)	D	1984–1988	2, 32	266	12	29	41	283	12	1	3	4	4	
Berti, Adam	(Canada)	LW	2007–2008	45	2	0	0	0	0	—	—	—	—	—	
Bertuzzi, Tyler †	(Canada)	LW	2024–present	59	82	23	23	46	51	—	—	—	—	—	
Bessler, Phil	(Canada)	RW	1938–1939	14	17	1	3	4	14	—	—	—	—	—	
Bicanek, Radim	(Czech Republic)	D	1998–2000	32	18	0	3	3	10	—	—	—	—	—	
Bickell, Bryan *	(Canada)	LW	2006–2016	22, 29, 38	384	65	70	135	188	75	20	19	39	42	SC 2013, 2015
Bjork, Anders	(United States)	LW	2022–2023	24	13	2	6	8	2	—	—	—	—	—	
Black, James	(Canada)	LW	1995–1998	34, 38	129	25	19	44	44	13	2	1	3	4	
Black, Steve	(Canada)	LW	1950–1951	17	39	4	6	10	22	—	—	—	—	—	
Blackwell, Colin	(United States)	C	2022–present	43	53	2	8	10	6	—	—	—	—	—	
Blade, Hank	(Canada)	C	1946–1948	11, 18, 19	24	2	3	5	2	—	—	—	—	—	
Blair, Andrew	(Canada)	C	1936–1937	15	44	0	3	3	33	—	—	—	—	—	
Blinco, Russ	(Canada)	LW	1938–1939	9	48	3	12	15	2	—	—	—	—	—	
Blunden, Michael	(Canada)	RW	2006–2008	44	10	0	0	0	0	—	—	—	—	—	
Bochenski, Brandon	(United States)	RW	2005–2007	20	30	4	2	6	10	—	—	—	—	—	
Bodnar, Gus	(Canada)	C	1947–1954	5, 12	399	87	142	131	116	7	1	1	2	2	
Boldirev, Ivan	(Canada)	C	1974–1979	12	384	140	195	335	186	18	4	6	10	4	
Bolland, Dave *	(Canada)	C	2006–2013	36	332	70	98	168	211	67	17	26	43	84	SC 2010, 2013
Bollig, Brandon *	(United States)	LW	2011–2014	52	125	7	7	14	201	24	1	1	2	37	SC 2013
Bondra, Peter	(Czech Republic)	RW	2006–2007	12	37	5	9	14	26	—	—	—	—	—	
Bonvie, Dennis	(Canada)	RW	1998–1999	37, 44, 46	11	0	0	0	44	—	—	—	—	—	
Boqvist, Adam	(Sweden)	D	2019–2021	27	76	6	23	29	20	8	0	0	0	4	
Bordeleau, Chris	(Canada)	C	1971–1972	23	25	6	8	14	6	—	—	—	—	—	
Bordeleau, J. P.	(Canada)	RW	1972–1980	22, 23, 25	519	97	126	223	143	56	6	12	18	12	
Borgstrom, Henrik	(Finland)	C	2021–22	13	52	4	3	7	22	—	—	—	—	—	
Bostrom, Helge	(Canada)	D	1929–1932	3, 9, 10, 17	96	3	3	6	68	13	0	0	0	16	Captain 1932–1933
Boucher, Georges	(Canada)	D	1931–1932	15	43	1	5	6	54	2	0	1	1	0	
Boudreau, Bruce	(Canada)	C	1985–1986	32	7	1	0	1	2	—	—	—	—	—	
Boudrias, Andre	(Canada)	C	1968–1969	18	20	4	10	14	4	—	—	—	—	—	
Bouma, Lance	(Canada)	LW	2017–2018	17	53	3	6	9	36	—	—	—	—	—	
Bourque, Rene	(Canada)	LW	2005–2008	12, 14	183	33	42	75	136	—	—	—	—	—	
Bowey, Madison	(Canada)	D	2020–2021	29	2	0	1	1	0	—	—	—	—	—	
Bowman, Kirk	(Canada)	LW	1976–1979	16, 28	88	11	17	28	19	7	1	0	1	0	
Boyd, Randy	(Canada)	D	1983–1985	2, 32	26	0	4	4	22	3	0	1	1	7	
Boyer, Wally	(Canada)	C	1966–1967	19	42	5	6	11	15	1	0	0	0	0	
Boynton, Nick *	(Canada)	D	2009–2011	24	48	1	8	9	48	3	0	0	0	2	SC 2010
Brayshaw, Russ	(Canada)	LW	1944–1945	16	43	5	9	14	24	—	—	—	—	—	
Brenneman, John	(Canada)	LW	1964–1965	12	17	1	0	1	2	—	—	—	—	—	
Brent, Tim	(Canada)	C	2008–2009	56	2	0	0	0	2	—	—	—	—	—	
Bretto, Joe	(United States)	D	1944–1945	2	3	0	0	0	4	—	—	—	—	—	
Brink, Milton	(United States)	C	1936–1937	11	5	0	0	0	0	—	—	—	—	—	
Brodie, T. J. †	(Canada)	D	2024–present	78	54	2	8	10	18	—	—	—	—	—	
Brookbank, Sheldon *	(Canada)	D	2013–2014	17	74	3	5	8	73	8	0	2	2	0	SC 2013
Brophey, Evan	(Canada)	C	2010–2011	47	1	0	0	0	0	—	—	—	—	—	
Brouwer, Troy *	(Canada)	LW	2006–2011	22 ,26, 29	238	49	54	103	161	43	4	6	10	31	SC 2010
Brown, Adam	(Canada)	LW	1946–1951	11, 18, 19	210	38	61	99	244	—	—	—	—	—	
Brown, Brad	(Canada)	D	1998–2000	2, 3	118	1	16	17	318	—	—	—	—	—	
Brown, Curtis	(Canada)	LW	2005–2006	37	71	5	10	15	38	—	—	—	—	—	
Brown, Keith	(Canada)	D	1979–1993	4, 25	812	64	266	330	854	103	4	32	36	184	
Brown, Mike	(Canada)	LW/RW	2005–2006	56	2	0	1	1	9	—	—	—	—	—	
Brown, Rob	(Canada)	RW	1991–1993	22, 44	40	6	17	23	67	8	2	4	6	4	
Browne, Cecil	(Canada)	LW	1927–1928	9	13	2	0	2	4	—	—	—	—	—	
Brunette, Andrew	(Canada)	RW	2011–2012	15	78	12	15	27	4	6	1	0	1	0	
Brydson, Glen	(Canada)	RW	1935–1938	3	70	14	13	27	56	2	0	0	0	4	
Buchanan, Mike	(Canada)	D	1951–1952	6	1	0	0	0	0	—	—	—	—	—	
Bulley, Ted	(Canada)	LW	1977–1982	29	349	94	102	196	645	28	5	5	10	24	
Burch, Billy	(United States)	C	1932–1933	4	22	2	0	2	2	—	—	—	—	—	
Burish, Adam *	(United States)	RW	2006–2010	37	169	11	10	21	323	32	3	2	5	32	SC 2010
Burke, Marty	(Canada)	D	1934–1938	4	150	3	8	11	114	4	0	0	0	4	
Burns, Bobby	(Canada)	LW	1928–1930	16	19	1	0	1	2	—	—	—	—	—	
Buskas, Rod	(Canada)	D	1991–1993	17, 25	46	0	4	4	106	6	0	1	1	0	
Butler, Dick	(Canada)	RW	1947–1948	8	7	2	0	2	0	—	—	—	—	—	
Buttrey, Gordon	(Canada)	RW	1943–1944	16	10	0	0	0	0	—	—	—	—	—	
Byfuglien, Dustin *	(United States)	D/LW	2005–2010	33, 52	260	55	54	109	268	39	14	11	25	46	SC 2010
Byram, Shawn	(Canada)	LW	1991–1992	46	1	0	0	0	0	—	—	—	—	—	
Caffery, Terry	(Canada)	C	1969–1970	14	6	0	0	0	0	—	—	—	—	—	
Caggiula, Drake	(Canada)	LW	2018–2020	91	66	14	13	27	44	8	1	2	3	2	
Calder, Kyle	(Canada)	LW	2000–2006	19, 22, 25	359	85	125	210	184	5	2	0	2	2	
Camazzola, Jim	(Canada)	LW	1983–1987	15, 25	3	0	0	0	0	—	—	—	—	—	
Campbell, Brian *	(Canada)	D	2008–2011; 2016–2017	51	295	24	110	134	70	47	4	14	18	8	SC 2010
Campbell, Bryan	(Canada)	C	1970–1972	14	168	23	51	74	50	16	1	3	4	2	
Campbell, Don	(Canada)	C	1943–1944	9	17	1	3	4	6	—	—	—	—	—	
Campbell, Jim	(United States)	RW	2001–2002	15	9	1	1	2	4	—	—	—	—	—	
Campoli, Chris	(Canada)	D	2010–2011	14	19	1	6	7	2	7	0	1	1	2	
Carbol, Leo	(Canada)	D	1942–1943	14	6	0	1	1	4	—	—	—	—	—	
Carcillo, Daniel *	(Canada)	LW	2011–2013; 2014–2015	13	90	8	14	22	147	4	0	1	1	6	SC 2013, 2015
Carey, Matt	(Canada)	LW	2013–2014	25	2	1	0	1	2	—	—	—	—	—	
Carlsson, Lucas	(Sweden)	D	2019–2021	46	18	0	2	2	2	1	0	0	0	0	
Carney, Keith	(United States)	D	1993–1998	4	271	14	47	61	275	26	1	6	7	10	
Carpenter, Ryan	(United States)	C/RW	2019–2022	22	168	10	21	31	83	9	0	1	1	0	
Carse, Bill	(Canada)	LW	1939–1942	9	123	27	39	66	38	7	2	1	3	0	
Carse, Bob	(Canada)	LW	1939–1943	16, 19	144	30	51	81	36	10	0	2	2	2	
Cassidy, Bruce	(Canada)	D	1983–1990	2, 3, 34, 37	36	4	13	17	10	1	0	0	0	0	
Chad, John	(Canada)	RW	1939–1946	16, 17, 19	80	15	22	37	29	10	0	1	1	2	
Chebaturkin, Vladimir	(Russia)	D	2001–2002	45	13	0	2	2	6	3	0	0	0	2	
Check, Lude	(Canada)	C	1944–1945	7	26	6	2	8	4	—	—	—	—	—	
Chelios, Chris	(United States)	D	1990–1999	7	664	92	395	487	1,495	65	12	36	48	133	Captain 1995–1999
Christian, Dave	(United States)	RW	1992–1994	25	69	4	17	21	12	2	0	0	0	0	
Chyzowski, Dave	(Canada)	LW	1996–1997	54	8	0	0	0	6	—	—	—	—	—	
Ciccone, Enrico	(Canada)	D	1995–1997	39	78	2	3	5	281	13	1	0	1	48	
Ciesla, Hank	(Canada)	C	1955–1957	20	140	18	31	49	50	—	—	—	—	—	
Clark, Wendel	(Canada)	LW	1999–2000	17	13	2	0	2	13	—	—	—	—	—	
Cleary, Daniel	(Canada)	LW	1997–1999	25, 32	41	4	5	9	24	—	—	—	—	—	
Clendening, Adam	(United States)	D	2014–2015	6	4	1	1	2	2	—	—	—	—	—	
Cloutier, Sylvain	(Canada)	C	1998–1999	14	7	0	0	0	0	—	—	—	—	—	
Cochrane, Glen	(Canada)	D	1987–1989	5	79	1	8	9	217	5	0	0	0	2	
Coffey, Paul	(Canada)	D	1998–1999	77	10	0	4	4	0	—	—	—	—	—	
Coflin, Hugh	(Canada)	D	1950–1951	2	31	0	3	3	33	—	—	—	—	—	
Cole, Danton	(United States)	RW	1995–1996	19	2	0	0	0	0	—	—	—	—	—	
Conacher, Jim	(Canada)	C	1948–1951	11, 14	178	49	71	120	71	—	—	—	—	—	
Conacher, Lionel *	(Canada)	RW	1933–1934	3	48	9	14	23	87	8	2	0	2	4	SC 1934
Conacher, Pete	(Canada)	LW	1951–1955	9, 19	131	26	20	46	32	2	0	0	0	0	
Conacher, Roy	(Canada)	LW	1947–1951	8, 9	264	102	125	227	42	—	—	—	—	—	
Conn, Rob	(Canada)	RW	1991–1992	42	2	0	0	0	2	—	—	—	—	—	
Connelly, Bert *	(Canada)	LW	1937–1938	18	15	1	2	3	4	1	0	0	0	0	SC 1938
Connolly, Brett	(Canada)	RW	2020–2022	20	19	1	2	3	17	—	—	—	—	—	
Cook, Tom *	(Canada)	C	1929–1936	11	327	74	94	168	180	24	2	4	6	19	SC 1934
Cooper, Joe	(Canada)	D	1939–1946	8	266	25	54	79	316	23	2	4	6	46	
Corazzini, Carl	(United States)	RW	2006–2007	49	7	0	1	1	2	—	—	—	—	—	
Corcoran, Norm	(Canada)	C	1955–1956	18	23	1	3	4	19	—	—	—	—	—	
Costello, Murray	(Canada)	C	1953–1954	20	40	3	2	5	6	—	—	—	—	—	
Cote, Sylvain	(Canada)	D	1999–2000	6	45	6	18	24	14	—	—	—	—	—	
Coulter, Arthur *	(Canada)	D	1932–1936	17, 18	170	13	14	27	204	12	2	0	2	12	SC 1934
Coulter, Thomas	(Canada)	D	1933–1934	15	2	0	0	0	0	—	—	—	—	—	
Couture, Gerry	(Canada)	C	1952–1954	15	110	25	23	48	36	7	1	0	1	0	
Couture, Rosario *	(Canada)	RW	1928–1935	7	319	48	54	102	185	23	1	5	6	17	SC 1934
Craven, Murray	(Canada)	LW	1994–1997	32	157	30	59	89	50	27	6	9	15	8	
Creighton, Adam	(Canada)	C	1988–1991	22	225	78	87	165	480	41	8	13	21	113	
Creighton, Dave	(Canada)	C	1954–1955	16	49	7	7	14	6	—	—	—	—	—	
Crevier, Louis †	(Canada)	D	2023–present	46	56	3	4	7	14	—	—	—	—	—	
Crossman, Doug	(Canada)	D	1981–1983	3, 23, 28, 31	159	25	70	95	72	24	3	10	13	10	
Cullen, Mark	(United States)	C	2005–2006	48	29	7	9	16	2	—	—	—	—	—	
Cullimore, Jassen	(Canada)	D	2005–2007; 2010–2011	5	155	2	20	22	125	—	—	—	—	—	
Cumiskey, Kyle *	(Canada)	D	2014–2015	26	7	0	0	0	0	9	0	0	0	0	SC 2015
Cummins, Jim	(United States)	RW	1994–1998	15	199	11	13	24	674	30	1	1	2	30	
Cunneyworth, Randy	(Canada)	LW	1993–1994	19	16	4	3	7	13	6	0	0	0	8	
Cunningham, Les	(Canada)	C	1939–1940	3	37	6	11	17	2	1	0	0	0	2	
Cushenan, Ian	(Canada)	D	1956–1958	3, 6	72	2	8	10	80	—	—	—	—	—	
Cyr, Denis	(Canada)	RW	1982–1984	11	87	19	21	40	21	1	0	0	0	0	
Dach, Colton †	(Canada)	C	2025–present	28	25	2	5	7	17	—	—	—	—	—	
Dach, Kirby	(Canada)	C	2019–2022	77	152	19	40	59	71	9	1	5	6	4	
Dahlbeck, Klas	(Sweden)	D	2014–2015	44	4	1	0	1	2	—	—	—	—	—	
Dahlen, Ulf	(Sweden)	RW	1996–1997	22	30	6	8	14	10	5	0	1	1	0	
Dahlstrom, Cully *	(United States)	C	1937–1945	15, 21	345	88	118	206	58	26	6	8	14	10	SC 1938
Dahlstrom, Carl	(Sweden)	D	2017–2019	63	49	0	9	9	6	—	—	—	—	—	
Daigle, Alain	(Canada)	RW	1974–1980	17	389	56	50	106	122	17	0	1	1	0	
Daley, Trevor	(Canada)	D	2015–2016	6	29	0	6	6	8	—	—	—	—	—	
Danault, Phillip	(Canada)	C	2014–2016	24	32	1	4	5	6	—	—	—	—	—	
Dano, Marko	(Slovakia)	LW	2015–2016	56	13	1	1	2	2	—	—	—	—	—	
Davidson, Brandon	(Canada)	D	2018–2019	22	10	0	1	1	15	—	—	—	—	—	
Davis, Lorne	(Canada)	RW	1954–1955	14	8	0	0	0	4	—	—	—	—	—	
Daze, Eric	(Canada)	LW	1995–2005	55	601	226	172	398	176	37	5	7	12	8	
Dea, Billy	(Canada)	RW	1957–1967	17	34	5	8	13	4	2	0	0	0	0	
Dean, Kevin	(United States)	RW	1999–2001	6	96	2	19	21	42	—	—	—	—	—	
DeBrincat, Alex	(United States)	RW	2017–2022	12	368	160	147	307	67	9	2	4	6	9	
DeBrusk, Louie	(Canada)	LW	2002–2003	33	4	0	0	0	7	—	—	—	—	—	
de Haan, Calvin	(Canada)	D	2019–2022	44	142	6	18	24	57	9	0	1	1	0	
Del Mastro, Ethan †	(Canada)	D	2024–present	38	26	2	4	6	6	—	—	—	—	—	
DeMarco, Ab	(Canada)	C	1938–1940	16	20	1	5	6	17	2	0	0	0	0	
Dempsey, Nathan	(Canada)	D	2002–2004	43	125	13	40	53	56	—	—	—	—	—	
Denneny, Corbett	(Canada)	C	1927–1928	6	18	5	0	5	12	—	—	—	—	—	
Desilets, Joffre	(Canada)	RW	1938–1940	19	74	17	20	37	34	—	—	—	—	—	
Desjardins, Andrew *	(Canada)	C	2015–2017	11	136	8	8	16	59	27	1	3	4	4	SC 2015
Desjardins, Victor	(United States)	C	1930–1931	18	39	3	12	15	17	9	0	0	0	0	
Dewsbury, Al	(Canada)	D	1950–1956	5, 22	323	26	75	101	351	7	1	2	3	4	
Dick, Harry	(Canada)	D	1954–1955	8	12	0	1	1	12	—	—	—	—	—	
Dickens, Ernie	(Canada)	D	1947–1951	3, 4	253	9	39	48	86	—	—	—	—	—	
Dickinson, Jason †	(Canada)	C	2022–present	16, 17	219	38	43	81	109	—	—	—	—	—	
Diduck, Gerald	(Canada)	RW	1994–1995	6	13	1	0	1	48	16	1	3	4	22	
Dietrich, Don	(Canada)	D	1983–1984	32	17	0	5	5	0	—	—	—	—	—	
Dineen, Bill	(Canada)	RW	1957–1958	20	41	4	9	13	8	—	—	—	—	—	
Dirk, Robert	(Canada)	D	1993–1994	6, 32	6	0	0	0	26	2	0	0	0	15	
Domi, Max	(Canada)	C	2022–2023	13	60	18	31	49	76	—	—	—	—	—	
Donaldson, Gary	(Canada)	RW	1973–1974	26	1	0	0	0	0	—	—	—	—	—	
Donato, Ryan †	(United States)	C	2023–present	8	158	43	49	92	68	—	—	—	—	—	
Donnelly, Dave	(Canada)	C	1986–1987	10	71	6	12	18	81	1	0	0	0	0	
Doraty, Ken	(Canada)	RW	1926–1927	14	18	0	0	0	0	—	—	—	—	—	
Dowd, Jim	(United States)	C	2005–2006	34	60	3	12	15	38	—	—	—	—	—	
Dowell, Jake	(United States)	C	2007–2011	28, 49	102	9	17	26	80	2	0	0	0	0	
Downey, Aaron	(Canada)	RW	2000–2002	39	39	1	0	1	82	4	0	0	0	8	
Doyon, Mario	(Canada)	RW	1988–1989	2	7	1	1	2	6	—	—	—	—	—	
Droppa, Ivan	(Slovakia)	D	1993–1996	58	19	0	1	1	14	—	—	—	—	—	
Dubinsky, Steve	(Canada)	C/RW	1994–1998; 2000–2001	14, 16, 22, 29, 32, 42	237	16	26	42	132	10	1	0	1	14	
Duclair, Anthony	(Canada)	LW	2017–2018	91	23	2	6	8	6	—	—	—	—	—	
Dumont, J. P.	(Canada)	RW	1998–2000	12, 17	72	19	14	33	28	—	—	—	—	—	
Dupont, Jerome	(Canada)	D	1981–1986	25	201	7	29	36	445	20	0	2	2	56	
Dutkowski, L. S. "Duke"	(Canada)	D	1926–1931	3	108	11	15	26	94	4	0	0	0	6	Captain 1929–1930
Dye, Cecil "Babe"	(Canada)	RW	1926–1928	4	52	25	5	30	14	2	0	0	0	2	
Dykhuis, Karl	(Canada)	D	1991–1993	19, 45	18	1	8	9	4	—	—	—	—	—	
Dyte, Jack	(Canada)	D	1943–1944	8	27	1	0	1	31	—	—	—	—	—	
Eager, Ben *	(Canada)	LW	2007–2010	55	144	18	15	33	308	35	2	3	5	81	SC 2010
Eagles, Mike	(Canada)	LW	1988–1990	11	70	6	13	19	78	—	—	—	—	—	
Eastwood, Mike	(Canada)	C	2002–2003	20	53	2	10	12	24	—	—	—	—	—	
Ebbett, Andrew	(Canada)	C	2009–2010	15	10	1	0	1	2	—	—	—	—	—	
Ehrhoff, Christian	(Germany)	D	2015–2016	55	8	0	2	2	2	—	—	—	—	—	
Ejdsell, Victor	(Sweden)	C	2017–2018	14	6	0	1	1	0	—	—	—	—	—	
Ellison, Matt	(Canada)	C	2003–2006	16	36	3	10	13	17	—	—	—	—	—	
Emerson, Nelson	(Canada)	RW	1998–1999	11	27	4	10	14	13	—	—	—	—	—	
Englund, Andreas	(Sweden)	D	2022–2023	28	11	0	1	1	9	—	—	—	—	—	
Entwistle, MacKenzie	(Canada)	RW	2021–present	58	126	10	14	24	39	—	—	—	—	—	
Erickson, Autry	(Canada)	D	1962–1964	12, 20	34	0	1	1	42	6	0	0	0	0	
Eriksson, Anders	(Sweden)	D	1998–2001	6, 8	97	5	36	41	22	—	—	—	—	—	
Erixon, Tim	(Sweden)	D	2014–2015	34	8	0	0	0	4	—	—	—	—	—	
Esposito, Phil	(Canada)	C	1963–1967	7, 15	235	74	100	174	135	29	4	4	8	24	
Evans, Jack *	(Canada)	D	1958–1963	5	346	4	42	46	319	40	1	1	2	58	SC 1961
Farrant, Walt "Whitey"	(Canada)	RW	1943–1944	16	1	0	0	0	0	—	—	—	—	—	
Fashoway, Gord	(Canada)	LW	1950–1951	11	13	3	2	5	14	—	—	—	—	—	
Feamster, Dave	(United States)	D	1981–1984	3, 32	169	13	24	37	154	33	3	5	8	61	
Felsner, Brian	(United States)	LW	1997–1998	44, 54	12	1	3	4	12	—	—	—	—	—	
Ferguson, Lorne	(Canada)	LW	1957–1959	11	104	13	19	32	66	6	2	1	3	2	
Fidler, Mike	(United States)	LW	1982–1983	8	4	2	1	3	4	—	—	—	—	—	
Field, Wilf	(Canada)	D	1944–1945	2, 11	39	3	4	7	20	—	—	—	—	—	
Fielder, Guyle	(United States)	C	1950–1951	16	3	0	0	0	0	—	—	—	—	—	
Finney, Sid	(Canada)	C	1951–1954	7, 14, 15	59	10	7	17	4	7	0	2	2	0	
Fitzgerald, Tom	(United States)	RW	2001–2002	12, 20	15	1	3	4	6	5	0	0	0	4	
Fleischmann, Tomas	(Czech Republic)	LW	2015–2016	12	19	4	1	5	4	4	0	0	0	0	
Fleming, Reg *	(Canada)	D	1960–1964	6	261	21	26	47	453	37	3	2	5	84	SC 1961
Fleury, Theoren	(Canada)	RW	2002–2003	14	54	12	21	33	77	—	—	—	—	—	
Fogolin, Lee	(Canada)	D	1950–1956	3, 20	304	5	36	41	432	7	0	1	1	4	
Foley, Rick	(Canada)	D	1970–1971	24	2	0	1	1	8	4	0	1	1	4	
Foligno, Nick †	(United States)	LW	2023–present	17	152	32	40	72	105	—	—	—	—	—	
Forsling, Gustav	(Sweden)	D	2016–2019	42	122	8	19	27	42	—	—	—	—	—	
Fortin, Alexandre	(Canada)	LW	2018–2019	84	24	3	3	6	2	—	—	—	—	—	
Fowler, Tom	(Canada)	LW	1946–1947	6	24	0	1	1	18	—	—	—	—	—	
Fox, Greg	(Canada)	D	1978–1983	2, 18	339	9	68	77	450	42	1	8	9	59	
Franson, Cody	(Canada)	D	2017–2018	11	23	1	6	7	8	—	—	—	—	—	
Fraser, Colin *	(Canada)	C	2007–2010	46	157	13	23	36	108	5	0	0	0	2	SC 2010
Fraser, Curt	(United States)	LW	1982–1988	8	303	94	120	214	537	38	11	9	20	90	
Fraser, Gord	(Canada)	D	1926–1928	10	54	15	7	22	103	2	1	0	1	6	
Fraser, Harvey	(Canada)	C	1944–1945	15	21	5	4	9	0	—	—	—	—	—	
Frawley, Dan	(Canada)	RW	1983–1985	10, 31, 32	33	4	3	7	64	1	0	0	0	0	
Frig, Len	(Canada)	D	1972–1974	6	66	4	10	14	35	11	2	1	3	0	
Frolik, Michael *	(Czech Republic)	LW	2010–2013	67	136	11	23	34	44	34	7	11	18	8	SC 2013
Gabriel, Kurtis	(Canada)	RW	2021–2022	79	2	0	0	0	0	—	—	—	—	—	
Gadsby, Bill	(Canada)	D	1946–1954	4, 16	468	54	132	186	650	7	0	1	1	4	Captain 1952–1954
Gagnon, Germain	(Canada)	LW	1973–1976	14	99	19	49	68	27	19	2	3	5	2	
Galvas, Jakub	(Czech Republic)	D	2021–Present	76	6	0	0	0	0	—	—	—	—	—	
Gamble, Dick	(Canada)	LW	1954–1955	20	14	2	0	2	6	—	—	—	—	—	
Garbutt, Ryan	(Canada)	LW	2015–2016	28	43	2	4	6	27	—	—	—	—	—	
Gardiner, Herb	(Canada)	D	1928–1929	2	4	0	0	0	0	—	—	—	—	—	
Gardner, Bill	(Canada)	C	1981–1986; 1987–1988	14, 31, 34	354	72	106	178	64	45	3	8	11	17	
Gardner, Cal	(Canada)	C	1952–1953	16	70	11	24	35	60	7	0	2	2	4	
Gaudette, Adam	(United States)	C	2021–Present	11	15	2	4	6	4	—	—	—	—	—	
Gauthier, Daniel	(Canada)	C	1994–1995	23	5	0	0	0	0	—	—	—	—	—	
Gee, George "Hully"	(Canada)	C	1945–1948; 1951–1954	9, 16, 17	365	94	130	224	257	11	2	3	5	10	
Gendron, Martin	(Canada)	RW	1997–1998	16	2	0	0	0	0	—	—	—	—	—	
Gilbert, Dennis	(United States)	D	2018–2020	39	22	1	2	3	40	—	—	—	—	—	
Gilbert, Greg	(Canada)	LW	1989–1993	14	273	42	64	106	204	52	7	17	24	72	
Gill, Todd	(Canada)	D	2002–2003	46	5	0	1	1	0	—	—	—	—	—	
Gillis, Paul	(Canada)	C	1990–1992	12	15	0	5	5	59	2	0	0	0	2	
Gilmour, Doug	(Canada)	C	1998–2000	93	135	38	74	112	107	—	—	—	—	—	Captain 1999–2000
Glover, Fred	(Canada)	C	1952–1953	14	31	4	2	6	37	—	—	—	—	—	
Glover, Howie	(Canada)	RW	1958–1959	18	13	0	1	1	2	—	—	—	—	—	
Goldham, Bob	(Canada)	D	1947–1950	2, 3	165	5	29	34	138	—	—	—	—	—	
Goldsworthy, Leroy *	(United States)	RW	1933–1935	8, 10	31	3	3	6	2	7	0	0	0	0	SC 1934
Gottselig, Johnny *	(Russian Empire)	LW	1928–1944	7, 14	591	176	196	372	211	43	13	13	26	18	SC 1934, 1938; Captain 1935–1940
Goulet, Michel	(Canada)	LW	1990–1994	16	276	92	115	207	212	26	5	9	14	12	
Goyer, Gerry	(Canada)	C	1967–1968	8	40	1	2	3	4	3	0	0	0	2	
Gracie, Bob	(Canada)	C	1938–1939	18	30	4	7	11	27	—	—	—	—	—	
Graham, Dirk	(Canada)	RW	1988–1995	8, 33	546	152	191	343	628	75	14	22	36	83	Captain 1989–1995
Graham, Teddy	(Canada)	D	1927–1933	3, 12	183	5	20	25	182	13	0	0	0	24	
Greene, Ryan †	(Canada)	C	2025–present	20	2	0	0	0	0	—	—	—	—	—	
Grieve, Brent	(Canada)	LW	1994–1996	19, 26	52	3	9	12	51	—	—	—	—	—	
Grigor, George	(Canada)	C	1943–1944	16	2	1	0	1	0	2	0	0	0	0	
Grimson, Stu	(Canada)	LW	1990–1993	23	167	3	4	7	610	21	0	1	1	60	
Gronman, Tuomas	(Finland)	D	1996–1997	46	16	0	1	1	13	—	—	—	—	—	
Grosek, Michal	(Czech Republic)	RW	1999–2000	17	14	2	4	6	12	—	—	—	—	—	
Grosso, Don	(Canada)	C	1944–1946	6, 11	68	16	16	32	21	4	0	0	0	17	
Guidolin, Bep	(Canada)	LW	1948–1952	16	262	46	91	137	292	—	—	—	—	—	
Gust, Dave†	(United States)	RW	2022–present	37	4	1	0	1	2	—	—	—	—	—	
Gustafsson, Erik	(Sweden)	D	2015–2020; 2021–2022	52, 56	273	31	103	134	83	5	0	1	1	0	
Guttman, Cole	(United States)	C	2022–present	70	14	4	2	6	4	—	—	—	—	—	
Hagel, Brandon	(Canada)	LW	2019–2022	38	108	30	31	61	34	—	—	—	—	—	
Hall, Murray	(Canada)	RW	1961–1964	7, 19	25	2	0	2	0	4	0	0	0	0	
Hall, Taylor †	(Canada)	C	2023–2025	71	56	11	17	28	20	—	—	—	—	—	
Hamill, Red	(Canada)	LW	1941–1950	3, 12, 15	370	112	80	192	150	7	1	1	2	7	Captain 1946–1947
Hamilton, Jeff	(United States)	RW	2006–2007	51	70	18	21	39	22	—	—	—	—	—	
Hamilton, Reg	(Canada)	D	1945–1947	4	58	1	10	11	33	4	0	1	1	2	
Handzus, Michal *	(Slovakia)	C	2006–2007; 2013–2014	26	78	8	22	30	26	42	5	9	14	14	SC 2013
Hankinson, Casey	(United States)	RW	2000–2002	20, 40	14	0	1	1	9	—	—	—	—	—	
Hanson, Oscar	(United States)	C	1937–1938	14	8	0	0	0	0	—	—	—	—	—	
Hardman, Mike	(United States)	RW	2021–present	86	37	1	4	5	11	—	—	—	—	—	
Harms, Johnny	(Canada)	RW	1943–1945	9	44	5	5	10	21	4	3	0	0	2	
Harrison, Jim	(Canada)	C	1976–1979	8	107	24	36	60	150	2	0	0	0	0	
Hartman, Ryan	(United States)	RW	2015–2018	38	141	27	30	57	130	4	0	0	0	14	
Hassard, Bob	(Canada)	C	1954–1955	12	17	0	0	0	4	—	—	—	—	—	
Havlat, Martin	(Czech Republic)	RW	2006–2009	24	172	64	97	161	80	16	5	10	15	8	
Hay, Bill *	(Canada)	C	1959–1967	8, 11	506	113	273	386	244	67	15	21	36	60	SC 1961
Hay, George	(Canada)	LW	1926–1927	4	35	14	10	24	12	2	1	0	1	2	
Hayden, John	(United States)	C	2017–2019	40	113	8	14	22	85	1	0	0	0	0	
Hayes, Jimmy	(United States)	RW	2011–2013	22, 39	43	6	7	13	16	2	0	0	0	15	
Helenius, Sami	(Finland)	D	2002–2003	4	10	0	1	1	28	—	—	—	—	—	
Henderson, Matt	(United States)	LW	2001–2002	16	4	0	1	1	0	—	—	—	—	—	
Hendry, Jordan *	(Canada)	D	2007–2011	6, 42	129	4	9	13	40	15	0	0	0	2	SC 2010
Henry, Burke	(Canada)	D	2002–2004	44	39	2	6	8	33	—	—	—	—	—	
Henry, Camille	(Canada)	C/LW	1964–1965	8	22	5	3	8	2	14	1	0	1	2	
Hergesheimer, Phil "Nip"	(Canada)	RW	1939–1943	10	122	21	41	62	17	6	0	0	0	2	
Hergesheimer, Wally	(Canada)	RW	1956–1957	7	41	2	8	10	12	—	—	—	—	—	
Herperger, Chris	(Canada)	C	1999–2001	36	70	10	15	25	25	—	—	—	—	—	
Heyliger, Vic	(United States)	C	1937–1938; 1943–1944	9, 18	33	2	3	5	2	—	—	—	—	—	
Hicks, Doug	(Canada)	D	1977–1979	28	57	2	15	17	17	4	1	0	1	2	
Hicks, Wayne *	(United States)	RW	1959–1961	8	1	0	0	0	0	2	0	1	1	2	SC 1961
Higgins, Tim	(Canada)	RW	1978–1984	15	358	79	106	185	335	39	4	7	11	35	
Highmore, Matthew	(Canada)	C	2018–2021	36	73	4	6	10	12	9	3	1	4	2	
Hilbert, Andy	(United States)	C	2005–2006	20	28	5	4	9	22	—	—	—	—	—	
Hildebrand, Ike	(Canada)	RW	1953–1955	14	9	1	4	5	4	—	—	—	—	—	
Hillman, Blake	(United States)	D	2017–2018	55	4	1	0	1	0	—	—	—	—	—	
Hillman, Wayne *	(Canada)	D	1961–1964	18, 20	164	4	12	16	145	14	0	3	3	17	SC 1961
Hinostroza, Vinnie	(United States)	C	2015–2018; 2020–2021	28, 48	123	17	34	51	41	1	0	0	0	0	
Hinton, Dan	(Canada)	LW	1976–1977	14, 25	14	0	0	0	16	—	—	—	—	—	
Hjalmarsson, Niklas *	(Sweden)	D	2007–2017	4, 41	623	23	120	143	238	128	2	26	28	46	SC 2010, 2013, 2015
Hodge, Ken	(Canada)	RW	1964–1967	14	132	16	42	58	106	11	0	0	0	12	
Hoffinger, Vic	(Russian Empire)	D	1927–1929	9	28	0	1	1	28	—	—	—	—	—	
Hofmeyer, Bob	(Canada)	D	1977–1979	26, 28	11	0	3	3	17	—	—	—	—	—	
Hollingworth, Gordon "Bucky"	(Canada)	D	1954–1955	6	70	3	9	12	135	—	—	—	—	—	
Holmes, Louis	(Canada)	C	1931–1933	9	59	2	4	6	8	2	0	0	0	2	
Holmqvist, Michael	(Sweden)	RW	2005–2007	17	135	16	17	33	47	—	—	—	—	—	
Holt, Randy	(Canada)	D	1974–1978	2, 4, 6	42	0	4	4	60	2	0	0	0	7	
Horacek, Tony	(Canada)	LW	1991–1995	34	38	1	5	6	99	2	1	0	1	2	
Horeck, Pete	(Canada)	LW/RW	1944–1946; 1951–1952	11, 19	178	53	54	107	112	4	0	0	0	2	
Horvath, Bronco	(Canada)	LW	1961–1962	9	68	17	29	46	19	12	4	1	5	6	
Hossa, Marian *	(Slovakia)	RW	2009–2017	81	534	186	229	415	170	107	21	52	73	49	SC 2010, 2013, 2015
Housley, Phil	(United States)	D	2001–2003	6	137	21	47	68	58	5	0	1	1	4	
Hrkac, Tony	(Canada)	C	1991–1992	11	18	1	2	3	6	3	0	0	0	2	
Hrymnak, Steve	(Canada)	D	1951–1952	19	18	2	1	3	4	—	—	—	—	—	
Hucul, Fred	(Canada)	D	1950–1954	6, 11, 15, 19	119	9	17	26	83	6	1	0	1	8	
Hudson, Mike	(Canada)	C	1988–1993	20, 43	257	38	58	96	274	36	4	9	13	54	
Hull, Bobby *	(Canada)	LW	1957–1972	7, 9, 16	1,036	604	549	1,153	634	116	62	67	129	102	SC 1961 #9 Retired by Blackhawks
Hull, Dennis	(Canada)	LW	1964–1977	2, 10	904	298	342	640	253	97	33	34	67	28	
Huska, Ryan	(Canada)	LW	1997–1998	56	1	0	0	0	0	—	—	—	—	—	
Hutchison, Dave	(Canada)	D	1980–1982	5	163	7	32	39	443	22	1	2	3	58	
Ingram, Frank	(Canada)	RW	1929–1932	15	99	24	16	40	69	11	0	1	1	2	
Ingram, Ron	(Canada)	D	1956–1963	3, 19	45	1	6	7	21	2	0	0	0	0	
Irvin, Dick	(Canada)	C	1926–1929	2	95	29	23	52	84	2	2	0	2	4	Captain 1926–1929
Jackson, Harold *	(Canada)	D	1936–1938	3, 9	41	1	3	4	6	1	0	0	0	2	SC 1938
Jackson, Jack	(Canada)	D	1946–1947	19	48	2	5	7	38	—	—	—	—	—	
Jackson, Jeff	(Canada)	LW	1991–1992	42	1	0	0	0	2	—	—	—	—	—	
Jankowski, Lou	(Canada)	RW	1953–1955	10, 19	108	18	15	33	15	—	—	—	—	—	
Janmark, Mattias	(Sweden)	C	2020–2021	13	41	10	9	19	8	—	—	—	—	—	
Janssens, Mark	(Canada)	C	1998–2001	20	124	1	6	7	171	—	—	—	—	—	
Jarrett, Doug	(Canada)	D	1964–1975	4, 20	721	38	178	216	608	99	7	16	23	82	
Jenkins, Roger *	(United States)	D/RW	1930–1934; 1937–1938	8, 9, 16, 18	156	7	21	28	107	18	0	6	6	12	SC 1934, 1938
Johansson, Magnus	(Sweden)	D	2007–2008	6	18	0	4	4	4	—	—	—	—	—	
Johansson, Roger	(Sweden)	D	1994–1995	26	11	1	0	1	6	—	—	—	—	—	
Johnson, Aaron	(Canada)	D	2008–2009	23	38	3	5	8	33	—	—	—	—	—	
Johnson, Greg	(Canada)	C	1997–1998	22	69	11	22	33	38	—	—	—	—	—	
Johnson, Jack	(United States)	D	2022–2023	8	58	0	4	4	16	—	—	—	—	—	
Johnson, Luke	(United States)	C	2018–2019	62	15	0	1	1	8	—	—	—	—	—	
Johnson, Norm	(Canada)	C	1958–1960	6	7	1	0	1	8	2	0	0	0	0	
Johnson, Reese	(Canada)	RW	2020–2024	52	100	5	7	12	63	—	—	—	—	—	
Johnson, Ryan	(Canada)	C	2010–2011	17	34	1	5	6	8	6	0	1	1	2	
Johnson, Tyler	(Canada)	C	2021–2024	90	82	15	24	39	28	—	—	—	—	—	
Johnson, Virgil *	(United States)	D	1937–1945	10, 18, 19	76	1	11	12	27	16	0	3	3	4	SC 1938
Johnsson, Kim	(Sweden)	D	2009–2010	8	8	1	2	3	4	—	—	—	—	—	
Johnston, George	(Canada)	RW	1941–1947	6, 9	58	20	12	32	2	—	—	—	—	—	
Johnston, Joey	(Canada)	RW	1975–1976	8	32	0	5	5	6	—	—	—	—	—	
Jokiharju, Henri	(Finland)	D	2018–2019	28	38	0	12	12	16	—	—	—	—	—	
Jones, Caleb	(United States)	D	2021–2023	82	124	9	22	31	58	—	—	—	—	—	
Jones, Seth †	(United States)	D	2021–2025	4	259	32	114	146	10	—	—	—	—	—	
Jones, Ty	(United States)	RW	1998–1999	27	8	0	0	0	12	—	—	—	—	—	
Jurco, Tomas	(Slovakia)	LW	2017–2018	13	42	7	4	11	14	—	—	—	—	—	
Kachur, Eddie	(Canada)	RW	1956–1958	8	96	10	14	24	35	—	—	—	—	—	
Kahun, Dominik	(Germany)	C	2018–2019	24	82	13	24	37	6	—	—	—	—	—	
Kaiser, Wyatt †	(United States)	D	2022–present	44	98	4	14	18	40	—	—	—	—	—	
Kaleta, Alex	(Canada)	LW	1941–1948	4, 14	206	60	84	144	118	7	1	3	4	2	
Kalynuk, Wyatt	(Canada)	D	2020–2022	48	26	4	5	9	6	—	—	—	—	—	
Kampf, David	(Czech Republic)	C	2017–2021	64	235	17	41	58	54	9	1	0	1	6	
Kane, Patrick*	(United States)	RW	2007–2023	88	1,161	446	779	1,225	420	136	52	80	132	64	SC 2010, 2013, 2015
Karpovtsev, Alexander	(Russia)	D	2000–2004	25, 52	182	7	39	46	105	5	1	0	1	0	
Katchouk, Boris	(Canada)	LW	2021–2024	14	79	6	11	17	41	—	—	—	—	—	
Keats, Duke	(Canada)	C	1927–1929	5	36	14	9	23	52	—	—	—	—	—	
Keith, Duncan *	(Canada)	D	2005–2021	2	1,192	105	520	625	653	135	18	68	86	66	SC 2010, 2013, 2015
Keith, Matt	(Canada)	C	2003–2007	11	24	2	3	5	14	—	—	—	—	—	
Kelly, Bob	(Canada)	LW	1977–1979	25	138	9	16	25	180	8	0	0	0	17	
Kelly, Regis "Pep"	(Canada)	RW	1936–1937; 1940–1941	3, 10	51	18	7	25	7	—	—	—	—	—	
Kempny, Michal	(Czech Republic)	D	2016–2018	6	81	3	12	15	34	1	0	0	0	0	
Kendall, Bill *	(Canada)	RW	1933–1938	9, 10	117	14	7	21	26	6	0	0	0	0	SC 1934
Kennedy, Forbes	(Canada)	C	1956–1957	10	69	8	13	21	104	—	—	—	—	—	
Kenny, Ernie	(Canada)	RW	1934–1935	10	4	0	0	0	8	—	—	—	—	—	
Kero, Tanner	(United States)	C	2015–2017	67	72	8	14	22	10	4	0	0	0	0	
Kerr, Reg	(Canada)	C/D	1977–1982	10	253	66	92	158	162	7	1	0	1	7	
Khaira, Jujhar	(Canada)	LW	2021–2023	16	78	9	8	17	44	—	—	—	—	—	
Kilger, Chad	(Canada)	C	1997–1999	15	86	17	19	36	36	—	—	—	—	—	
Kimble, Darin	(Canada)	C	1993–1995	20, 29	79	4	2	6	163	1	0	0	0	5	
King, Kris	(Canada)	LW	2000–2001	12, 16	13	1	0	1	8	—	—	—	—	—	
Klemm, Jon	(Canada)	D	2001–2003	42	171	6	31	37	106	5	0	1	1	4	
Klimovich, Sergei	(Russia)	C	1996–1997	17	1	0	0	0	2	—	—	—	—	—	
Klingbeil, Ernest	(United States)	D	1936–1937	5	5	1	2	3	2	—	—	—	—	—	
Klinkhammer, Rob	(Canada)	LW	2010–2011	59	1	0	0	0	0	—	—	—	—	—	
Koci, David	(Czech Republic)	LW/D	2006–2008	48	27	0	0	0	156	—	—	—	—	—	
Koekkoek, Slater	(Canada)	D	2018–2020	68	64	2	13	15	52	9	1	2	3	2	
Konroyd, Steve	(Canada)	D	1988–1992	5	251	10	47	57	179	42	4	3	7	37	
Kontiola, Petri	(Finland)	C	2007–2008	34	12	0	5	5	6	—	—	—	—	—	
Kopecky, Tomas *	(Slovakia)	C	2009–2011	82	155	25	38	63	88	18	4	2	6	8	SC 2010
Korchinski, Kevin †	(Canada)	D	2023–present	14,55	92	6	11	17	28	—	—	—	—	—	
Korab, Jerry	(Canada)	D	1970–1973	22	196	25	34	59	341	30	1	1	2	62	
Korolev, Igor	(Russia)	C	2001–2004	22	192	16	35	51	72	5	0	1	1	0	
Koroll, Cliff	(Canada)	RW	1969–1980	20	814	208	254	462	376	85	19	29	48	67	
Kostka, Michael	(Canada)	D	2013–2014	6	9	2	1	3	8	—	—	—	—	—	
Kravchuk, Igor	(Soviet Union) (Russia)	D	1991–1993	3	56	7	17	24	34	18	2	6	8	8	
Krivokrasov, Sergei	(Russia)	RW	1993–1998	25, 55, 58	225	42	41	83	146	21	2	0	2	14	
Kruger, Marcus *	(Sweden)	C	2010–2017; 2018–2019	16, 22	472	37	80	117	206	87	6	10	16	14	SC 2013, 2015
Kryskow, Dave	(Canada)	LW	1972–1974	14, 17	83	8	12	20	22	10	2	0	0	2	
Kryzanowski, Ed	(Canada)	D	1952–1953	6	5	0	0	0	0	—	—	—	—	—	
Kubalik, Dominik	(Czech Republic)	LW	2019–2022	8	202	62	54	116	50	9	4	4	8	4	
Kucera, Frantisek	(Czech Republic)	D	1990–1994	6	232	14	49	63	161	6	0	0	0	0	
Kukkonen, Lasse	(Finland)	D	2003–2004; 2006–2007	6, 47	64	5	10	15	34	—	—	—	—	—	
Kunitz, Chris	(Canada)	LW	2018–2019	14	56	5	5	10	23	—	—	—	—	—	
Kurashev, Philipp †	(Switzerland)	C	2020–present	23	317	48	82	130	75	—	—	—	—	—	
Kuryluk, Merve	(Canada)	LW	1961–1962	20	—	—	—	—	—	3	0	0	0	0	
L'Abbe, Moe	(Canada)	C	1972–1973	18	5	0	1	1	0	—	—	—	—	—	
Lacroix, Andre	(Canada)	C	1971–1972	18	51	4	7	11	6	1	0	0	0	0	
Ladd, Andrew *	(Canada)	LW	2007–2010; 2015–2016	16	203	45	66	111	105	43	7	5	12	40	SC 2010
Lafferty, Sam	(United States)	C/LW	2021–2023	24	97	15	17	32	49	—	—	—	—	—	
Laflamme, Christian	(Canada)	D	1996–1999	3, 44	138	2	23	25	131	—	—	—	—	—	
Lafrance, Leo	(Canada)	LW	1927–1928	14	15	1	0	1	4	—	—	—	—	—	
Laing, Quintin	(Canada)	LW	2003–2004	45	3	0	1	1	0	—	—	—	—	—	
Lalande, Hec	(Canada)	C	1953–1958	17, 19	140	21	37	58	116	—	—	—	—	—	
Lalonde, Shawn	(Canada)	D	2012–2013	42	1	0	0	0	0	—	—	—	—	—	
Lang, Robert	(Czech Republic)	C	2007–2008	20	76	21	33	54	50	—	—	—	—	—	
Lanz, Rick	(Canada)	D	1991–1992	42	1	0	0	0	2	—	—	—	—	—	
Lapointe, Martin	(Canada)	RW	2005–2008	22	216	30	32	62	251	—	—	—	—	—	Captain 2005–2007
LaPrarie, Ben "Bun"	(United States)	RW	1936–1937	3	7	0	0	0	0	—	—	—	—	—	
Larmer, Jeff	(Canada)	LW	1983–1986	10	45	9	13	22	20	5	1	0	1	2	
Larmer, Steve	(Canada)	RW	1981–1993	28, 31	891	406	517	923	475	107	45	66	111	75	
Larochelle, Wildor	(Canada)	RW	1935–1937	14	70	11	12	23	14	2	0	0	0	0	
Lauer, Brad	(Canada)	LW	1991–1993	11, 15	13	0	1	1	6	7	1	1	2	2	
LaVarre, Mark	(United States)	RW	1985–1988	7, 15	78	9	16	25	58	1	0	0	0	2	
Leblanc, Drew	(United States)	C	2012–2013	14	2	0	0	0	0	—	—	—	—	—	
LeBlanc, Jean-Paul	(Canada)	C	1968–1969	22	6	1	2	3	0	—	—	—	—	—	
Lecuyer, Doug	(Canada)	C	1978–1981	7	69	4	10	14	100	7	4	0	4	15	
Leddy, Nick *	(United States)	D	2010–2014	8	258	20	73	93	34	54	2	8	10	10	SC 2013
Ledingham, Walt	(Canada)	LW	1972–1973	24	9	0	1	1	4	—	—	—	—	—	
Leier, Eddie	(Canada)	C	1949–1951	18	16	2	1	3	2	—	—	—	—	—	
Lemieux, Jocelyn	(Canada)	LW/RW	1990–1994	26	331	44	57	101	420	44	5	9	14	63	
Lepisto, Sami	(Finland)	D	2011–2012	20	26	1	2	3	4	3	0	0	0	0	
Leroux, Jean-Yves	(Canada)	LW	1997–2001	23, 37	220	16	22	38	146	—	—	—	—	—	
Lesieur, Art	(United States)	D	1928–1929	12	3	0	0	0	0	—	—	—	—	—	
Leswick, Jack *	(Canada)	C	1933–1934	9	37	1	7	8	16	—	—	—	—	—	SC 1934
Leswick, Tony	(Canada)	LW	1955–1956	8	70	11	11	22	71	—	—	—	—	—	
Levinsky, Alex *	(United States)	D	1935–1938	8	197	8	24	32	171	14	1	0	1	0	SC 1938
Levshunov, Artyom †	(Belarus)	D	2025–present	55	18	0	6	6	8	—	—	—	—	—	
Lewicki, Danny	(Canada)	LW	1958–1959	8	58	8	14	22	4	3	0	0	0	0	
Lindsay, Ted	(Canada)	LW	1957–1960	7	206	44	79	123	385	10	3	5	8	13	
Litzenberger, Ed *	(Canada)	C/RW	1954–1961	12	438	145	199	344	239	20	4	9	13	14	SC 1961; Captain 1958–1961
Locking, Norm	(Canada)	LW	1934–1936	9	48	2	6	8	26	—	—	—	—	—	
Logan, Dave	(Canada)	D	1976–1979	2, 4, 6, 14	178	4	24	28	348	8	0	0	0	10	
Loughlin, Clem	(Canada)	D	1928–1929	2	24	0	1	1	16	—	—	—	—	—	
Low, Reed	(Canada)	RW	2006–2007	34	6	0	0	0	31	—	—	—	—	—	
Lowrey, Gerry	(Canada)	C	1931–1932	8	48	8	3	11	32	2	1	0	1	2	
Ludzik, Steve	(Canada)	C	1982–1989	29, 31	413	46	92	138	327	44	4	8	12	70	
Lunde, Len	(Canada)	LW	1962–1966	18	84	10	29	39	32	4	0	0	0	2	
Lundy, Pat	(Canada)	C	1950–1951	9, 14, 18	61	9	9	18	9	—	—	—	—	—	
Lynn, Vic	(Canada)	LW	1952–1954	4	40	1	10	11	25	7	1	1	2	4	
Lysiak, Tom	(Canada)	C	1979–1986	12	474	137	275	412	238	65	23	33	56	37	
Maatta, Olli	(Finland)	D	2019–2020	6	65	4	13	17	20	9	3	3	6	4	
MacDonald, Craig	(Canada)	C	2006–2007	27	25	3	2	5	14	—	—	—	—	—	
MacKay, David	(Canada)	D	1940–1941	4, 11	27	3	0	3	28	5	0	1	1	2	
MacKay, Mickey	(Canada)	C	1926–1928	6	70	31	12	43	46	2	0	0	0	0	
MacKenzie, Bill *	(Canada)	D	1937–1940	4, 9	102	2	3	5	70	10	0	1	1	11	SC 1938
MacKenzie, Pudge	(United States)	LW	1932–1933	8	36	4	4	8	13	—	—	—	—	—	
Mackey, David	(Canada)	LW	1987–1989	26	46	2	5	7	149	—	—	—	—	—	
MacMillan, Bob	(Canada)	C	1984–1985	11	36	5	7	12	12	—	—	—	—	—	
MacNeil, Al	(Canada)	D	1962–1966	19	260	10	46	56	344	28	0	4	4	61	
Madden, John *	(Canada)	C	2009–2010	11	79	10	13	23	12	22	1	1	2	2	SC 2010
Maggs, Darryl	(Canada)	D	1971–1973	4, 17	76	7	4	11	8	4	0	0	0	0	
Magnuson, Keith	(Canada)	D	1969–1979	3	589	14	125	139	1,440	68	3	9	12	164	Captain 1976–1979 #3 Retired by Blackhawks
Maki, Chico *	(Canada)	RW	1961–1975	16, 18	841	143	293	436	345	112	17	36	53	43	SC 1961
Maki, Wayne	(Canada)	LW	1967–1969	14	50	5	5	10	32	2	1	0	1	2	
Maloney, Dan	(Canada)	LW	1970–1973	19	131	25	31	56	237	10	0	1	1	8	
Maloney, Phil	(Canada)	C	1958–1960	18	46	8	6	14	4	6	0	0	0	0	
Maneluk, Mike	(Canada)	LW	1998–1999	14	28	4	3	7	8	—	—	—	—	—	
Manning, Brandon	(Canada)	D	2018–2019	23	27	1	2	3	21	—	—	—	—	—	
Manson, Dave	(Canada)	D	1986–1991; 1998–2000	3, 8, 11, 14, 22	431	45	110	155	1,322	50	2	13	15	203	
March, Mush *	(Canada)	RW	1928–1945	5	761	153	231	384	546	46	12	15	27	43	SC 1934, 1938
Marchment, Bryan	(Canada)	D	1991–1994	2	149	11	29	40	523	20	1	0	1	48	
Marha, Josef	(Czech Republic)	C	1998–2001	11, 44	118	12	20	32	28	—	—	—	—	—	
Mariucci, John	(United States)	D	1940–1942; 1945–1948	2, 11	224	11	34	45	328	12	0	3	3	26	Captain 1940–1942, 1945–1948
Marks, John	(Canada)	D/RW	1972–1981	11	657	112	163	275	330	57	5	9	14	60	
Maroon, Patrick	(United States)	LW	2024–2025	77	68	5	14	29	97	—	—	—	—	—	
Marotte, Gilles	(Canada)	D	1967–1970	2	192	10	63	73	294	11	3	1	4	14	
Marsh, Peter	(Canada)	LW/RW	1980–1983	17	197	24	44	68	156	26	1	5	6	33	
Martin, Clare	(Canada)	D	1951–1952	6	30	1	2	3	6	—	—	—	—	—	
Martin, Frank	(Canada)	D	1954–1957	4, 19, 20	200	8	27	35	78	—	—	—	—	—	
Martin, Pit	(Canada)	C	1967–1977	7	740	243	384	627	439	80	26	25	51	38	Captain 1975–1977
Martinez, Alec †	(Switzerland)	D	2024–present	25	44	5	7	12	8	—	—	—	—	—	
Martinsen, Andreas	(Norway)	LW	2017–2019	29	33	2	3	5	31	—	—	—	—	—	
Mashinter, Brandon	(Canada)	LW	2015–2016	53	41	4	1	5	23	2	0	0	0	2	
Masnick, Paul	(Canada)	C	1954–1955	18	14	1	0	1	8	—	—	—	—	—	
Mason, Charlie	(Canada)	RW	1938–1939	14	13	1	3	4	0	—	—	—	—	—	
Matte, Joe	(Canada)	D	1942–1943	11	12	0	2	2	8	—	—	—	—	—	
Matteau, Stephane	(Canada)	LW	1991–1994	32	164	35	42	77	198	21	4	7	11	26	
Mayers, Jamal *	(Canada)	C/RW	2011–2013	22	100	6	11	17	107	3	0	0	0	0	SC 2013
Mazur, Eddie	(Canada)	LW	1956–1957	19	15	0	1	1	4	—	—	—	—	—	
McAlpine, Chris	(United States)	D	2000–2002	4, 39	90	0	9	9	68	1	0	0	0	0	
McAmmond, Dean	(Canada)	LW	1991–1992; 1999–2001	19, 34	154	25	40	65	117	3	0	0	0	2	
McBurney, Jim	(Canada)	LW	1952–1953	18	1	0	1	1	0	—	—	—	—	—	
McCabe, Bryan	(Canada)	D	1999–2000	44	79	6	19	25	139	—	—	—	—	—	
McCabe, Jake	(Canada)	D	2021–2023	6	130	6	36	42	60	—	—	—	—	—	
McCaig, Doug	(Canada)	D	1948–1951	6	171	3	12	15	138	—	—	—	—	—	
McCalmon, Eddie	(Canada)	RW	1927–1928	11	23	2	0	2	6	—	—	—	—	—	
McCarthy, Steve	(Canada)	D	1999–2004	5	134	3	13	16	45	—	—	—	—	—	
McCormack, John	(Canada)	C	1954–1955	17	63	5	7	12	8	—	—	—	—	—	
McDill, Jeff	(Canada)	RW	1976–1977	27	1	0	0	0	0	—	—	—	—	—	
McDonald, Ab *	(Canada)	LW	1960–1964	14	265	73	107	180	59	33	12	13	25	9	SC 1961
McDonald, Brian	(Canada)	C	1967–1968	17	—	—	—	—	—	8	0	0	0	2	
McDonald, Byron "Butch"	(Canada)	LW	1944–1945	16	26	6	13	19	0	—	—	—	—	—	
McFadden, Jim	(Canada)	C	1951–1954	18	159	36	48	84	49	7	3	0	3	4	
McFadyen, Don *	(Canada)	C	1932–1936	15	176	12	34	46	77	11	2	2	4	7	SC 1934
McFarlane, Gord	(Canada)	D	1926–1927	12	2	0	0	0	0	—	—	—	—	—	
McGill, Bob	(Canada)	D	1987–1991	25	281	10	26	36	641	29	0	0	0	39	
McGill, Ryan	(Canada)	D	1991–1992	45	9	0	2	2	20	—	—	—	—	—	
McIntyre, Jack	(Canada)	D	1953–1957	11, 20	231	52	39	91	98	—	—	—	—	—	
McKay, Ray	(Canada)	D	1968–1971	5, 17	28	0	1	1	35	1	0	0	0	0	
McKegney, Ian	(Canada)	D	1976–1977	24	3	0	0	0	2	—	—	—	—	—	
McKegney, Tony	(Canada)	LW	1990–1991	11	9	0	1	1	4	2	0	0	0	4	
McKenzie, John	(Canada)	RW	1958–1959; 1963–1965	18, 21	128	20	23	43	114	17	0	2	2	14	
McKinnon, Alex	(Canada)	RW	1928–1929	6	44	1	1	2	54	—	—	—	—	—	
McLean, Brett	(Canada)	C	2002–2004	53	78	11	20	31	54	—	—	—	—	—	
McMahon, Mike	(Canada)	D	1968–1969	4	20	0	8	8	6	—	—	—	—	—	
McMurchy, Tom	(Canada)	LW	1983–1986	22, 23	46	4	3	7	57	—	—	—	—	—	
McNeill, Mark	(Canada)	RW	2015–2016	41	1	0	0	0	0	—	—	—	—	—	
McNeill, Mike	(United States)	LW	1990–1991	41	23	2	2	4	6	—	—	—	—	—	
McRae, Basil	(Canada)	RW	1996–1997	17	8	0	0	0	12	—	—	—	—	—	
McVeigh, Charles "Rabbit"	(Canada)	C	1926–1928	7	84	18	12	30	27	2	0	0	0	0	
Megna, Jaycob	(United States)	D	2023–2024	24	44	0	2	2	22	—	—	—	—	—	
Melnyk, Gerry	(Canada)	C	1961–1965	12	63	5	16	21	2	13	0	0	0	2	
Menard, Hillary "Minnie"	(Canada)	LW	1953–1954	19	1	0	0	0	0	—	—	—	—	—	
Menard, Howie	(Canada)	C	1969–1970	6	19	2	3	5	8	—	—	—	—	—	
Michaluk, Arthur	(Canada)	D	1947–1948	4, 20	5	0	0	0	0	—	—	—	—	—	
Michaluk, John	(Canada)	LW	1950–1951	17	1	0	0	0	0	—	—	—	—	—	
Mickey, Larry	(Canada)	RW	1964–1965	6	1	0	0	0	0	—	—	—	—	—	
Mickoski, Nick	(Canada)	LW/RW	1954–1957	9	220	49	65	114	138	—	—	—	—	—	
Mikheyev, Ilya †	(Russia)	RW	2024–present	95	80	20	14	34	16	—	—	—	—	—	
Mikita, Stan *	(Slovakia)	C	1959–1979	21	1,396	541	926	1,467	1,264	155	59	91	150	169	SC 1961; Captain 1976–1977
Miller, Earl	(Canada)	LW	1927–1932	16, 17	94	16	11	27	122	2	1	0	1	6	
Miller, Jack	(Canada)	LW	1949–1951	11, 14	17	0	0	0	4	—	—	—	—	—	
Miller, Kevin	(United States)	D	1996–1998	16, 17	106	18	24	42	49	6	0	1	1	0	
Miller, Kip	(United States)	C	1995–1996	14, 23	10	1	4	5	2	—	—	—	—	—	
Mills, Brad	(Canada)	C	2013–2014	51	3	0	0	0	0	—	—	—	—	—	
Mills, Craig	(Canada)	RW	1997–1999	22, 39, 46	27	0	3	3	36	—	—	—	—	—	
Mironov, Boris	(Russia)	D	1999–2003	2, 3	220	21	69	90	231	1	0	0	0	2	
Miszuk, John	(Canada)	RW	1965–1967	4, 10	5	1	1	2	2	5	0	0	0	6	
Mitchell, Bill "Red"	(Canada)	D	1941–1945	8, 20	83	4	5	9	67	—	—	—	—	—	
Mitchell, Ian	(Canada)	D	2020–2023	51	82	4	12	16	22	—	—	—	—	—	
Moen, Travis	(Canada)	LW	2003–2004	59	82	4	2	6	142	—	—	—	—	—	
Mohns, Doug	(Canada)	D/LW	1964–1971	2, 11	415	116	163	279	372	43	5	16	21	60	
Montador, Steve	(Canada)	D	2011–2012	5	52	5	9	14	45	—	—	—	—	—	
Moore, Oliver †	(Canada)	C	2025–present	11	9	0	4	4	4	—	—	—	—	—	
Moran, Amby	(Canada)	D	1927–1928	12	23	1	1	2	14	—	—	—	—	—	
More, Jayson	(Canada)	D	1997–1998	4	17	0	2	2	8	—	—	—	—	—	
Moreau, Ethan	(Canada)	LW	1996–1999	17, 19, 23, 40	210	33	32	65	284	6	1	0	1	9	
Morenz, Howie	(Canada)	C	1934–1936	3	72	12	36	48	41	2	0	0	0	0	
Morgan, Jason	(Canada)	C	2005–2006	38	7	1	1	2	6	—	—	—	—	—	
Morin, Jeremy	(United States)	RW	2010–2014	11, 26, 27	54	8	8	16	56	2	0	0	0	2	
Morrison, Brendan	(Canada)	C	2011–2012	17	11	0	0	0	6	3	1	0	1	0	
Morrison, Don	(Canada)	C	1950–1951	5	59	8	12	20	6	—	—	—	—	—	
Mortson, Gus	(Canada)	D	1952–1958	2	390	25	80	105	647	7	1	1	2	6	Captain 1954–1957
Mosdell, Ken	(Canada)	C	1956–1957	18	25	2	4	6	8	—	—	—	—	—	
Mosienko, Bill	(Canada)	RW	1942–1955	8, 10	711	258	282	540	133	22	10	4	14	15	
Motte, Tyler	(United States)	LW	2016–2017	64	33	4	3	7	14	—	—	—	—	—	
Muir, Bryan	(Canada)	D	1998–2000	37, 45	64	3	7	10	63	—	—	—	—	—	
Mulvey, Grant	(Canada)	RW	1974–1982	22	574	148	133	281	797	42	10	5	15	70	
Muni, Craig	(Canada)	D	1992–1994	3	18	0	4	4	12	4	0	0	0	2	
Murphy, Connor †	(Canada)	D	2017–present	5	487	30	81	111	344	9	0	4	4	4	
Murphy, Joe	(Canada)	RW	1992–1996	17	210	83	96	179	304	36	16	8	24	95	
Murphy, Ron *	(Canada)	LW	1957–1964	10	459	105	127	232	231	24	3	2	5	14	SC 1961
Murray, Bob	(Canada)	D	1975–1990	6	1,008	132	382	514	873	112	19	37	55	106	Captain 1985–1986
Murray, Chris	(Canada)	RW	1998–1999	15	4	0	0	0	14	—	—	—	—	—	
Murray, Troy	(Canada)	C	1982–1991; 1993–1994	19	688	197	291	488	707	86	15	25	40	112	
Nabokov, Dmitri	(Russia)	C	1997–1998	46	25	7	4	11	10	—	—	—	—	—	
Nasreddine, Alain	(Canada)	D	1998–1999	32	7	0	0	0	19	—	—	—	—	—	
Nattrass, Ralph	(Canada)	D	1946–1950	5, 17	223	18	38	56	308	—	—	—	—	—	
Nazar, Frank †	(United States)	C	2024–present	91	56	13	14	27	24	—	—	—	—	—	
Nesterenko, Eric *	(Canada)	C/RW	1956–1972	15	1,013	207	288	495	1,014	115	13	22	35	112	SC 1961
Nichol, Scott	(Canada)	C	2003–2004	12	75	7	11	18	145	—	—	—	—	—	
Nicholls, Bernie	(Canada)	C	1994–1996	92	107	41	70	111	92	26	3	18	21	12	
Nicholson, Ivan "Hickey"	(Canada)	LW	1937–1938	14	2	1	0	1	0	—	—	—	—	—	
Nickulas, Eric	(United States)	LW	2003–2004	20	21	1	1	2	8	—	—	—	—	—	
Nieminen, Ville	(Finland)	LW	2003–2004	20	60	2	11	13	40	—	—	—	—	—	
Nikolishin, Andrei	(Russia)	C	2002–2003	11	60	6	15	21	26	—	—	—	—	—	
Nilsson, Jacob	(Sweden)	LW	2018–2019	67	2	0	0	0	0	—	—	—	—	—	
Noonan, Brian	(Canada)	RW	1987–1994	10	329	63	85	148	300	26	9	9	18	38	
Nordqvist, Jonas	(Sweden)	C	2006–2007	32	3	0	2	2	2	—	—	—	—	—	
Nordstrom, Joakim *	(Sweden)	C	2013–2015	42	54	1	5	6	6	10	0	0	0	0	SC 2015
Northcott, Lawrence "Baldy"	(Canada)	LW	1938–1939	11	46	5	7	12	9	—	—	—	—	—	
Nylander, Alexander	(Sweden)	RW	2019–2020	92	65	10	16	26	10	8	0	0	0	2	
Nylander, Michael	(Sweden)	C	1999–2002	37, 92	239	63	117	180	112	5	0	3	3	2	
Nylund, Gary	(Canada)	D	1986–1988	22	179	14	37	51	461	9	0	2	2	21	
O'Callahan, Jack	(United States)	D	1982–1987	5	303	15	64	79	393	27	3	8	11	35	
O'Connell, Mike	(United States)	D	1978–1980	14	166	18	61	79	106	11	0	1	1	4	
O'Donnell, Sean	(Canada)	D	2011–2012	6	51	0	7	7	23	2	0	0	0	0	
O'Shea, Danny	(Canada)	C	1970–1972	11	66	10	16	26	38	18	2	5	7	18	
Odelein, Lyle	(Canada)	D	2001–2003	7	77	7	6	13	80	4	0	1	1	25	
Oduya, Johnny *	(Sweden)	D	2011–2015; 2016–2017	27	234	10	35	45	82	75	5	18	23	30	SC 2013, 2015
Oesterle, Jordan	(United States)	D	2017–2018	82	55	5	10	15	8	—	—	—	—	—	
Ogilvie, Brian	(Canada)	C	1972–1973	18	12	1	2	3	4	—	—	—	—	—	
Olczyk, Ed	(United States)	C/RW	1984–1987; 1998–1999	16	322	77	132	209	274	22	7	6	13	15	
Olesz, Rostislav	(Czech Republic)	LW	2011–2012	85	6	0	0	0	6	—	—	—	—	—	
Olmstead, Bert	(Canada)	RW	1948–1951	14, 19	94	22	32	54	44	—	—	—	—	—	
Orban, Bill	(Canada)	LW	1967–1969	6	84	7	8	15	50	3	0	0	0	0	
Orr, Bobby	(Canada)	D	1976–1979	4	26	6	21	27	29	—	—	—	—	—	
Ouellette, Eddie	(Canada)	LW	1935–1936	16	43	3	2	5	11	1	0	0	0	0	
Pahlsson, Samuel	(Sweden)	C	2008–2009	26	13	2	1	3	2	17	2	3	5	4	
Palangio, Pete *	(Canada)	LW	1936–1938	18	49	10	10	20	20	3	0	0	0	0	SC 1938
Paliotta, Michael	(United States)	D	2014–2015	47	1	0	1	1	0	—	—	—	—	—	
Palmer, Rob	(United States)	C	1973–1976	14	16	0	3	3	2	—	—	—	—	—	
Panarin, Artemi	(Russia)	LW	2015–2017	72	162	61	90	151	53	11	2	6	8	14	
Panik, Richard	(Slovakia)	LW	2016–2018	14	149	34	34	68	90	10	0	4	4	8	
Papike, Joe	(United States)	RW	1940–1945	11, 14	20	3	3	6	4	5	0	2	2	0	
Pappin, Jim	(Canada)	RW	1968–1975	8	488	216	228	444	447	69	26	26	52	91	
Parenteau, P. A.	(Canada)	RW	2006–2007	58	5	0	1	1	2	—	—	—	—	—	
Paterson, Rick	(Canada)	C	1979–1987	8, 26, 27	430	50	43	93	136	61	7	10	17	51	
Paynter, Kent	(Canada)	D	1987–1989	7, 33, 38	3	0	0	0	4	—	—	—	—	—	
Pelensky, Perry	(Canada)	RW	1983–1984	34	4	0	0	0	5	—	—	—	—	—	
Pelletier, Pascal	(Canada)	C	2008–2009	27	7	0	0	0	0	—	—	—	—	—	
Peluso, Mike	(United States)	D	1989–1992	26, 44	118	12	4	16	743	20	1	2	3	10	
Peluso, Mike	(United States)	RW	2001–2002	17	37	4	2	6	19	—	—	—	—	—	
Perreault, Yanic	(Canada)	C	2007–2008	94	53	9	5	14	24	—	—	—	—	—	
Perlini, Brendan	(Canada)	LW	2018–2019	11	47	12	3	15	20	—	—	—	—	—	
Perry, Corey	(Canada)	RW	2023–2024	94	16	4	5	9	12	—	—	—	—	—	
Peters, Jimmy	(Canada)	RW	1951–1954	7, 14, 15	186	43	46	89	55	7	0	1	1	4	
Phillipoff, Harold	(Canada)	LW	1978–1980	19	23	0	4	4	26	4	0	1	1	7	
Phillips, Isaak †	(Canada)	D	2021–2025	41	56	2	10	12	31	—	—	—	—	—	
Philp, Luke	(Canada)	C	2022–present	39	3	0	1	1	2	—	—	—	—	—	
Pilote, Pierre *	(Canada)	D	1956–1968	3, 21, 22	821	77	400	477	1,211	82	8	52	60	98	SC 1961; Captain 1961–1968 #3 Retired by Blackhawks
Pinder, Gerry	(Canada)	LW/RW	1969–1971	18	149	32	38	70	76	17	0	4	4	6	
Pitlick, Rem	(Canada)	C	2024–2025	20	9	0	0	0	2	—	—	—	—	—	
Pirri, Brandon	(Canada)	C	2010–2014; 2020–2021	14, 37, 73	36	6	7	13	6	—	—	—	—	—	
Pisani, Fernando	(Canada)	RW	2010–2011	15	60	7	9	16	10	3	0	0	0	0	
Plante, Derek	(United States)	C	1999–2000	12	17	1	1	2	2	—	—	—	—	—	
Plante, Pierre	(Canada)	RW	1977–1978	15	77	10	18	28	59	1	0	0	0	0	
Playfair, Jim	(Canada)	D	1987–1989	20, 37, 39	19	1	3	4	49	—	—	—	—	—	
Poapst, Steve	(Canada)	D	2000–2004	8, 42	220	7	23	30	118	5	0	0	0	0	
Poeta, Tony	(Canada)	RW	1951–1952	34	1	0	0	0	0	—	—	—	—	—	
Poile, Norman "Bud"	(Canada)	RW	1947–1949	11, 19	58	23	29	52	19	—	—	—	—	—	
Portland, Jack	(Canada)	D	1939–1941	11	26	1	4	5	26	2	0	0	0	2	
Posa, Victor	(Italy)	D	1985–1986	34	2	0	0	0	2	—	—	—	—	—	
Potulny, Ryan	(United States)	C	2010–2011	16	3	0	0	0	0	—	—	—	—	—	
Poulin, Patrick	(Canada)	LW	1993–1996	44	141	34	36	70	109	20	4	1	5	8	
Powell, Ray	(Canada)	C	1950–1951	12, 18	31	7	15	22	2	—	—	—	—	—	
Powis, Geoff	(Canada)	C	1967–1968	5	2	0	0	0	0	—	—	—	—	—	
Powis, Lynn	(Canada)	C	1973–1974	12	57	8	13	21	6	1	0	0	0	0	
Presley, Wayne	(United States)	RW	1985–1991	17	355	93	93	186	495	51	17	12	29	98	
Preston, Rich	(Canada)	RW	1979–1984; 1986–1987	11, 16	429	96	127	223	257	47	4	18	22	56	
Price, Jack	(Canada)	D	1951–1954	9, 19	57	4	6	40	24	4	0	0	0	0	
Probert, Bob	(Canada)	LW	1995–2002	24	461	49	76	125	1,210	18	2	3	5	64	
Prokopec, Mike	(Canada)	RW	1995–1997	23	15	0	0	0	11	—	—	—	—	—	
Prystai, Metro	(Canada)	C	1947–1950; 1954–1955	4, 6, 17	242	60	56	116	111	—	—	—	—	—	
Purpur, Cliff "Fido"	(United States)	RW	1941–1945	3, 4	119	24	33	57	38	9	1	1	2	0	
Quackenbush, Max	(Canada)	D	1951–1952	19, 20	14	0	1	1	4	—	—	—	—	—	
Quenneville, John	(Canada)	C	2019–2020	47	9	0	0	0	0	2	0	0	0	0	
Quint, Deron	(United States)	D	2003–2004	2	51	4	7	11	18	—	—	—	—	—	
Quintal, Stephane	(Canada)	D	2000–2001	4	72	1	18	19	60	—	—	—	—	—	
Raddysh, Taylor	(Canada)	RW	2021–2024	11	172	31	30	61	40	—	—	—	—	—	
Radulov, Igor	(Russia)	LW	2002–2004	50	43	9	7	16	22	—	—	—	—	—	
Raglan, Clare	(Canada)	D	1951–1953	3, 6, 19	67	1	8	9	38	3	0	0	0	0	
Ramsay, Les	(Canada)	LW	1944–1945	15	11	2	2	4	2	—	—	—	—	—	
Rasmussen, Dennis	(Sweden)	C	2015–2017	70	112	8	9	17	16	3	1	0	1	0	
Ravlich, Matt	(Canada)	D	1964–1969	5	245	5	47	52	254	24	1	5	6	16	
Redmond, Dick	(Canada)	D	1972–1977	15	341	71	156	227	218	38	7	16	23	14	
Reekie, Joe	(Canada)	D	2001–2002	23	17	0	2	2	28	1	0	0	0	2	
Regin, Peter	(Denmark)	C	2014–2015	12	21	2	3	5	2	5	0	0	0	0	
Regula, Alec	(United States)	D	2020–present	75	22	1	0	1	16	—	—	—	—	—	
Reibel, Earl "Dutch"	(Canada)	C	1957–1958	9	40	4	12	16	6	—	—	—	—	—	
Reichel, Lukas †	(Germany)	LW	2021–Present	73	169	20	34	54	30	—	—	—	—	—	
Reid, Tom	(Canada)	D	1967–1969	4	86	0	7	7	37	9	0	0	0	2	
Reise, Leo	(Canada)	D	1945–1947	8	23	0	0	0	19	—	—	—	—	—	
Rheaume, Pascal	(Canada)	RW	2001–2002	15	19	0	2	2	4	—	—	—	—	—	
Ribble, Pat	(Canada)	D	1978–1980	5	35	2	5	7	22	4	0	0	0	4	
Richards, Brad *	(Canada)	C	2014–2015	91	76	12	25	37	12	23	3	11	14	8	SC 2015
Richardson, Dave	(Canada)	LW	1965–1966	6	3	0	0	0	2	—	—	—	—	—	
Richmond, Danny	(United States)	D	2005–2008	44	39	0	2	2	68	—	—	—	—	—	
Riley, Jim	(Canada)	LW	1926–1927	14	3	0	0	0	0	—	—	—	—	—	
Rinzel, Sam †	(Canada)	D	2025–present	6	9	0	5	5	0	—	—	—	—	—	
Ripley, Vic	(Canada)	C/LW	1928–1933	4	174	41	24	65	125	13	2	1	3	4	
Robidas, Stephane	(Canada)	D	2003–2004	17	45	2	10	12	33	—	—	—	—	—	
Robinson, Buddy	(United States)	RW	2022–2023	53	9	1	2	3	4	—	—	—	—	—	
Robinson, Doug	(Canada)	LW	1963–1965	5, 14	40	2	9	11	8	4	0	0	0	0	
Robinson, Earl	(Canada)	RW	1938–1939	10	48	9	6	15	13	—	—	—	—	—	
Rodden, Eddie	(Canada)	C	1926–1928	8	27	3	4	7	6	2	0	1	1	0	
Roenick, Jeremy	(United States)	C	1988–1996	27, 51	524	267	329	596	570	82	35	42	77	53	
Romanchych, Larry	(Canada)	C	1970–1971	28	10	0	2	2	2	—	—	—	—	—	
Romnes, Elwin *	(United States)	C/LW	1930–1938	12, 17, 19, 61	309	60	120	180	40	33	6	14	20	4	SC 1934, 1938
Roos, Filips	(Sweden)	D	2022–2024	48	21	1	2	3	4	—	—	—	—	—	
Rota, Darcy	(Canada)	LW	1973–1979	18	448	117	110	227	450	28	4	1	5	39	
Royer, Remi	(Canada)	D	1998–1999	6	18	0	0	0	67	—	—	—	—	—	
Rozsival, Michal *	(Czech Republic)	D	2013–2017	32	207	4	45	49	115	54	1	10	11	32	SC 2013, 2015
Rucinski, Mike	(United States)	C	1987–1989	36	1	0	0	0	0	2	0	0	0	0	
Rundblad, David *	(Sweden)	D	2014–2016	5	63	3	13	16	18	8	0	0	0	4	SC 2015
Ruskowski, Terry	(Canada)	C	1979–1982	8	211	30	138	168	609	18	1	4	5	86	Captain 1979–1982
Russell, Cam	(Canada)	D	1990–1998	8, 52	361	8	19	27	788	44	0	5	5	16	
Russell, Phil	(Canada)	D	1972–1979	5	504	53	176	229	1,288	39	1	9	10	132	
Rutta, Jan	(Czech Republic)	D	2017–2019	44	80	8	18	26	36	—	—	—	—	—	
Ruuttu, Christian	(Finland)	C	1992–1995	22	158	28	62	90	208	10	0	0	0	4	
Ruutu, Tuomo	(Finland)	C	2003–2007	15	228	48	60	108	259	—	—	—	—	—	
Rychel, Warren	(Canada)	LW	1988–1991	12, 42	2	0	0	0	17	—	—	—	—	—	
Saad, Brandon *	(United States)	LW	2011–2015; 2017–2020	20, 43	428	114	127	241	86	76	17	22	39	18	SC 2013, 2015
Salmelainen, Tony	(Finland)	LW	2006–2007	8	57	6	11	17	26	—	—	—	—	—	
Samsonov, Sergei	(Russia)	LW	2007–2008	8	23	0	4	4	6	—	—	—	—	—	
Sandford, Ed	(Canada)	LW	1955–1956	10	56	12	9	21	50	—	—	—	—	—	
Sanford, Zach	(United States)	LW	2023–present	13	18	0	4	4	2	—	—	—	—	—	
Sanipass, Everett	(Canada)	LW	1986–1990	7	126	17	26	43	309	5	2	0	2	4	
Sasakamoose, Fred	(Canada)	C	1953–1954	21	11	0	0	0	6	—	—	—	—	—	
Savard, Denis	(Canada)	C	1980–1990; 1995–1997	18	881	377	719	1,096	1,005	131	61	84	145	207	Captain 1988–1989
Savard, Jean	(Canada)	C	1977–1979	27	42	7	12	19	29	—	—	—	—	—	
Sceviour, Darin	(Canada)	RW	1986–1987	32	1	0	0	0	0	—	—	—	—	—	
Schaefer, Paul	(United States)	D	1936–1937	15	5	0	0	0	6	—	—	—	—	—	
Schmaltz, Nick	(United States)	C	2016–2018	8	162	29	62	91	30	4	0	0	0	2	
Schmautz, Bobby	(Canada)	RW	1967–1969	19	76	12	9	21	43	11	2	3	5	2	
Sclisizzi, Enio	(Canada)	LW	1952–1953	14	14	0	2	2	0	—	—	—	—	—	
Scott, John	(Canada)	D	2010–2012	32	69	0	2	2	120	4	0	0	0	22	
Scuderi, Rob	(United States)	D	2015–2016	47	17	0	0	0	0	—	—	—	—	—	
Seabrook, Brent *	(Canada)	D	2005–2020	7	1,114	103	361	464	661	123	20	39	59	83	SC 2010, 2013, 2015
Secord, Al	(Canada)	LW	1980–1990	14, 20	466	213	160	373	1,426	68	20	27	47	266	
Sedlbauer, Ron	(Canada)	LW	1979–1981	19	84	25	13	38	26	7	1	1	2	6	
Seeler, Nick	(United States)	D	2019–2020	55	6	0	1	1	7	—	—	—	—	—	
Seibert, Earl *	(Canada)	D	1936–1945	17	410	57	134	191	400	31	7	5	12	34	SC 1938; Captain 1940–1942
Sekac, Jiri	(Czech Republic)	LW	2015–2016	34	6	0	1	1	2	—	—	—	—	—	
Seney, Brett	(Canada)	LW	2022–present	62	11	1	0	1	2	—	—	—	—	—	
Shantz, Jeff	(Canada)	C	1993–1999	11	312	36	80	116	155	38	5	8	13	20	
Sharp, Patrick *	(Canada)	C	2005–2015; 2017–2018	10	749	249	283	532	411	117	42	38	80	50	SC 2010, 2013, 2015
Sharpley, Glen	(Canada)	C	1980–1982	7	71	19	23	42	23	16	6	5	11	16	
Shaw, Andrew *	(Canada)	C	2011–2016; 2019–2021	65	362	75	76	151	339	67	16	19	35	116	SC 2013, 2015
Shea, Pat	(United States)	D	1931–1932	10	10	1	0	1	0	—	—	—	—	—	
Sheehan, Bobby	(United States)	C	1975–1976	27	78	11	20	31	18	4	0	0	0	0	
Shelton, Doug	(Canada)	LW	1967–1968	19	5	0	1	1	2	—	—	—	—	—	
Sheppard, John *	(Canada)	LW	1933–1934	4	41	3	4	7	4	7	0	0	0	0	SC 1934
Shill, Jack *	(Canada)	LW	1937–1939	3	48	6	7	13	12	10	1	3	4	15	SC 1938
Shmyr, Paul	(Canada)	D	1968–1971	6	84	2	16	18	75	17	0	0	0	25	
Sikura, Dylan	(Canada)	C	2017–2020	95	47	1	13	14	0	—	—	—	—	—	
Simon, Chris	(Canada)	LW	2002–2003	17	61	12	6	18	125	—	—	—	—	—	
Simon, John "Cully"	(Canada)	D	1944–1945	17	28	0	0	0	14	—	—	—	—	—	
Simpson, Reid	(Canada)	LW	1997–1999	33	91	8	6	14	247	—	—	—	—	—	
Simpson, Todd	(Canada)	D	2005–2006	27	45	0	3	3	116	—	—	—	—	—	
Skalde, Jarrod	(Canada)	C	1997–1998	16	7	0	1	1	4	—	—	—	—	—	
Skille, Jack	(United States)	RW	2007–2011	11, 12	79	12	13	25	30	—	—	—	—	—	
Skov, Glen	(Canada)	C	1955–1960	14	346	44	75	119	150	10	2	1	3	6	
Slaggert, Landon †	(United States)	LW	2024–present	84	49	3	7	10	27	—	—	—	—	—	
Slavin, Josiah	(United States)	LW	2021–2022	36	15	0	1	1	4	—	—	—	—	—	
Sleaver, John	(Canada)	C	1953–1957	15	13	1	0	1	4	—	—	—	—	—	
Sloan, Tod *	(Canada)	C	1958–1961	9	195	58	78	136	189	21	4	6	10	8	SC 1961
Smith, Ben *	(United States)	RW	2010–2015	28, 57	156	23	16	39	4	27	7	2	9	2	SC 2013
Smith, Clint	(Canada)	C	1943–1947	2, 3	202	81	121	202	12	13	6	9	15	0	Captain 1944–1945
Smith, Craig †	(United States)	C	2024–2025	15	40	9	7	16	28	—	—	—	—	—	
Smith, Des	(Canada)	D	1939–1940	11	26	1	4	5	27	—	—	—	—	—	
Smith, Glen	(Canada)	RW	1950–1951	1	2	0	0	0	0	—	—	—	—	—	
Smith, Steve	(Canada)	D	1991–1996	3, 5	317	25	111	136	920	47	1	12	13	72	
Smith, Wayne	(Canada)	D	1966–1967	5	2	1	1	2	2	1	0	0	0	0	
Smith, Zack	(Canada)	C/LW	2019–2020	15	50	4	7	11	29	—	—	—	—	—	
Smolenak, Radek	(Czech Republic)	LW	2009–2010	52	1	0	0	0	5	—	—	—	—	—	
Smolinki, Bryan	(United States)	C	2006–2007	11	62	14	23	37	29	—	—	—	—	—	
Smyth, Greg	(Canada)	D	1993–1995	3	60	0	3	3	141	6	0	0	0	0	
Soderberg, Carl	(Sweden)	C	2020–2021	34	34	7	8	15	14	—	—	—	—	—	
Solheim, Ken	(Canada)	LW	1980–1981	5	5	2	0	2	0	—	—	—	—	—	
Somers, Art	(Canada)	C	1929–1931	6	77	14	19	33	111	11	0	0	0	2	
Sopel, Brent *	(Canada)	D	2007–2010	5	154	3	27	30	70	22	1	5	6	8	SC 2010
Spacek, Jaroslav	(Czech Republic)	D	2000–2002; 2005–2006	3, 6	155	15	45	60	121	—	—	—	—	—	
St. Pierre, Martin	(Canada)	C	2005–2008	47	21	1	3	4	8	—	—	—	—	—	
St. Laurent, Dollard *	(Canada)	D	1958–1962	19	270	10	51	61	190	33	1	8	9	32	SC 1961
Stalberg, Victor *	(Sweden)	LW	2010–2013	25	203	43	47	90	102	32	1	5	6	19	SC 2013
Stanfield, Fred	(Canada)	LW	1964–1967	6, 18	107	10	12	22	14	20	2	1	3	2	
Stanfield, Jack	(Canada)	LW	1965–1966	10	—	—	—	—	—	1	0	0	0	0	
Stanley, Allan	(Canada)	D	1954–1956	4	111	14	28	42	92	—	—	—	—	—	
Stanley, Barney	(Canada)	RW	1927–1928	14	1	0	0	0	0	—	—	—	—	—	
Stanton, Ryan	(Canada)	D	2012–2013	55	1	0	0	0	2	—	—	—	—	—	
Stapleton, Mike	(Canada)	C	1986–1992	12, 15, 16	125	9	21	30	82	4	0	0	0	2	Captain 1969–1970
Stapleton, Pat	(Canada)	D	1965–1973	12	545	41	286	327	301	65	10	39	49	40	
Stasiuk, Vic	(Canada)	LW	1949–1951	17, 18	38	6	4	10	8	—	—	—	—	—	
Stewart, Gaye	(Canada)	LW/RW	1947–1950	10, 15	178	70	66	136	172	—	—	—	—	—	Captain 1948–1949
Stewart, Jack	(Canada)	D	1950–1952	2	63	1	5	6	61	—	—	—	—	—	Captain 1950–1952
Stewart, Karl	(Canada)	LW	2006–2007	57	37	2	3	5	43	—	—	—	—	—	
Stewart, Ken	(Canada)	D	1941–1942	10	6	1	1	2	0	—	—	—	—	—	
Stillman, Riley	(Canada)	D	2020–2022	61	65	3	10	13	38	—	—	—	—	—	
Stratton, Art	(Canada)	C	1965–1966	10	2	0	0	0	0	—	—	—	—	—	
Strome, Dylan	(Canada)	C	2018–2022	17	225	60	94	154	72	9	2	1	3	2	
Strudwick, Jason	(Canada)	D/LW	2002–2004	34	102	3	6	9	160	—	—	—	—	—	
Sullivan, Frank	(Canada)	D	1954–1956	25	2	0	0	0	0	—	—	—	—	—	
Sullivan, Red	(Canada)	C	1954–1956	7, 8, 21	133	33	68	101	109	—	—	—	—	—	
Sullivan, Steve	(Canada)	C/LW	1999–2004	15, 26	370	118	185	303	251	5	1	0	1	2	
Suomi, Al	(United States)	LW	1936–1937	14	5	0	0	0	0	—	—	—	—	—	
Suter, Gary	(United States)	D	1994–1998	6, 20	301	53	126	179	284	34	9	14	23	32	
Suter, Pius	(Switzerland)	C	2020–2021	24	55	14	13	27	14	—	—	—	—	—	
Sutter, Brent	(Canada)	C	1991–1998	12	417	76	143	219	293	56	6	9	15	44	
Sutter, Darryl	(Canada)	C	1980–1987	27	406	161	118	279	286	51	24	19	43	26	Captain 1982–1987
Sutter, Duane	(Canada)	RW	1987–1990	12, 16	184	18	32	50	440	41	4	2	6	84	
Sutter, Rich	(Canada)	RW	1993–1995	15	98	12	14	26	136	6	0	0	0	2	
Svedberg, Viktor	(Sweden)	D	2015–2016	43	27	2	2	4	4	3	0	0	0	6	
Sykora, Michal	(Czech Republic)	D	1996–1998	6	56	2	12	14	22	1	0	0	0	0	
Taffe, Jeff	(Canada)	C	2010–2011	23	1	0	0	0	0	—	—	—	—	—	
Tallon, Dale	(Canada)	D	1973–1978	19	325	44	112	156	296	29	2	10	12	41	
Tanti, Tony	(Canada)	LW	1981–1983	8, 11	3	1	0	1	0	—	—	—	—	—	
Taylor, Harry	(Canada)	C	1951–1952	9, 15	15	1	1	2	0	—	—	—	—	—	
Taylor, Ralph "Bouncer"	(Canada)	D	1927–1930	12	80	2	1	3	142	—	—	—	—	—	
Tepper, Stephen	(United States)	RW	1992–1993	68	1	0	0	0	0	—	—	—	—	—	
Teravainen, Teuvo *†	(Finland)	C	2014–2016; 2024–present	86	197	32	70	102	32	25	4	7	11	0	SC 2015
Terbenche, Paul	(Canada)	D	1967–1968	18	68	3	7	10	8	5	0	0	0	0	
Thomas, Cy	(United Kingdom)	LW	1947–1948	15	6	1	0	1	8	—	—	—	—	—	
Thomas, Steve	(Canada)	RW	1987–1991; 2001–2003	32	334	110	120	230	423	46	13	16	29	64	
Thompson, Paul *	(Canada)	LW	1931–1939	6	365	118	146	264	196	24	8	9	17	12	SC 1934, 1938
Thoms, Bill	(Canada)	C	1938–1944	12	253	63	112	175	59	4	0	1	1	0	
Thomson, Jim	(Canada)	D	1957–1958	5	70	4	7	11	75	—	—	—	—	—	
Thornton, Shawn	(Canada)	RW	2002–2006	49	31	2	1	3	70	—	—	—	—	—	
Tichy, Milan	(Czech Republic)	D	1992–1993	43	13	0	1	1	30	—	—	—	—	—	
Tikhonov, Viktor	(Russia)	RW	2015–2016	14	11	0	0	0	6	—	—	—	—	—	
Timgren, Ray	(Canada)	LW	1954–1955	16, 19	14	1	1	2	2	—	—	—	—	—	
Timonen, Kimmo *	(Finland)	D	2014–2015	44	16	0	0	0	2	18	0	0	0	10	SC 2015
Tinordi, Jarred †	(United States)	D	2022–2024	25	44	2	6	8	40	—	—	—	—	—	
Todd, Kevin	(Canada)	C	1993–1994	14	35	5	6	11	16	—	—	—	—	—	
Toews, Jonathan *	(Canada)	C	2007–2023	19	1,067	372	511	883	607	137	45	74	119	84	SC 2010, 2013, 2015; Captain 2008–2023
Tonelli, John	(Canada)	C	1991–1992	72	33	1	7	8	37	—	—	—	—	—	
Tootoo, Jordin	(Canada)	D	2016–2017	22	50	2	1	3	28	2	0	0	0	0	
Toppazzini, Jerry	(Canada)	RW	1953–1955	19	83	11	19	30	77	—	—	—	—	—	
Toppazzini, Zellio	(Canada)	RW	1956–1957	15	7	0	0	0	0	—	—	—	—	—	
Torkki, Jari	(Finland)	LW	1988–1989	44	4	1	0	1	0	—	—	—	—	—	
Toupin, Jack	(Canada)	RW	1943–1944	9	8	1	2	3	0	4	0	0	0	0	
Townsend, Art	(Canada)	D	1926–1927	11	5	0	0	0	0	—	—	—	—	—	
Trapp, Bobby	(Canada)	D	1926–1928	2	82	4	4	8	131	2	0	0	0	4	
Traub, Percy	(Canada)	D	1926–1927	2	42	0	2	2	83	2	0	0	0	6	
Trimper, Tim	(Canada)	LW	1979–1980	28, 38	30	6	10	16	10	1	0	0	0	2	
Trudel, Louis *	(United States)	LW	1933–1938	11, 16	215	28	45	73	94	22	0	3	3	6	SC 1934, 1938
Turner, Bob	(Canada)	D	1961–1963	2	139	11	5	16	72	18	1	0	1	12	
Tuten, Aud	(United States)	D	1941–1943	2	39	4	8	12	48	—	—	—	—	—	
Ubriaco, Gene	(Canada)	LW	1969–1970	19	22	1	1	2	2	4	0	0	0	2	
Ulanov, Igor	(Russia)	D	1995–1996	6, 45	53	1	8	9	92	—	—	—	—	—	
Vaive, Rick	(Canada)	RW	1987–1989	27	106	55	39	94	168	5	6	2	8	38	
Valk, Garry	(Canada)	LW	2002–2003	15	16	0	1	1	6	—	—	—	—	—	
Van Dorp, Wayne	(Canada)	LW	1988–1990	23	69	7	4	11	331	24	0	1	1	40	
Van Impe, Ed	(Canada)	D	1966–1967	2	61	8	11	19	111	6	0	0	0	8	
Van Riemsdyk, Trevor *	(United States)	D	2014–2017	57	158	8	23	31	62	15	1	0	1	2	SC 2015
VandenBussche, Ryan	(Canada)	RW	1998–2004	14, 19, 23, 32, 34	263	7	10	17	592	1	0	0	0	0	
Vandermeer, Jim	(Canada)	D	2003–2008	23	171	11	41	52	271	—	—	—	—	—	
Varis, Petri	(Canada)	D	1997–1998	17	1	0	0	0	0	—	—	—	—	—	
Vasko, Elmer *	(Canada)	D	1956–1966	4, 22	641	32	153	185	608	64	2	5	7	69	SC 1961
Vaydik, Greg	(Canada)	C	1976–1977	24	5	0	0	0	0	—	—	—	—	—	
Veleno, Joe †	(Canada)	C	2025–present	90	18	3	4	7	4	—	—	—	—	—	
Vermette, Antoine *	(Canada)	C	2014–2015	80	19	0	3	3	6	20	4	3	7	4	SC 2015
Versteeg, Kris *	(Canada)	RW	2007–2010; 2013–2015	23, 32	294	68	96	164	158	66	12	19	31	46	SC 2010, 2015
Vincelette, Dan	(Canada)	LW	1987–1989; 1991–1992	11, 16, 17, 29, 32	166	20	20	40	288	12	0	0	0	4	
Vlasic, Alex †	(United States)	D	2021–present	43, 72	179	7	42	49	59	—	—	—	—	—	
Vokes, Ed	(Canada)	RW	1930–1931	8	5	0	0	0	0	—	—	—	—	—	
Von Arx, Reto	(Switzerland)	LW	2000–2001	17	19	3	1	4	4	—	—	—	—	—	
Vopat, Roman	(Czech Republic)	C	1998–1999	14	3	0	0	0	4	—	—	—	—	—	
Vorobiev, Pavel	(Russia)	RW	2003–2006	32	57	10	15	25	38	—	—	—	—	—	
Voss, Karl *	(United States)	C	1937–1938	14	33	3	8	11	0	9	3	2	5	0	SC 1938
Vrbata, Radim	(Czech Republic)	RW	2005–2007	16	122	27	48	75	42	—	—	—	—	—	
Wagner, Austin	(Canada)	LW	2022–2023	26, 27	7	1	1	2	0	—	—	—	—	—	
Walker, Matt	(Canada)	D	2008–2009	8	65	1	13	14	79	17	0	2	2	14	
Wallmark, Lucas	(Sweden)	C	2020–2021	71	16	0	3	3	6	—	—	—	—	—	
Walton, Mike	(Canada)	C	1978–1979	16	26	6	3	9	4	4	1	0	1	0	
Ward, Don	(Canada)	D	1957–1958	4	3	0	0	0	0	—	—	—	—	—	
Wares, Eddie	(Canada)	RW	1945–1947	15	106	8	18	26	55	3	0	1	1	0	
Wasnie, Nick	(Canada)	RW	1927–1928	13	14	1	0	1	22	—	—	—	—	—	
Watson, Bill	(Canada)	RW	1985–1989	11, 14	115	23	36	59	12	6	0	2	2	0	
Watson, Harry	(Canada)	LW	1954–1957	5	168	36	49	85	19	—	—	—	—	—	
Wedin, Anton	(Sweden)	LW	2019–2020	57	4	0	0	0	4	—	—	—	—	—	
Weinrich, Eric	(Canada)	D	1993–1998	2	356	21	92	113	309	38	2	12	14	24	
Weise, Dale	(Canada)	RW	2015–2016	25	15	0	1	1	2	4	1	0	1	0	
Wentworth, Marvin	(Canada)	D	1927–1932	10	216	17	24	41	149	11	1	1	2	14	Captain 1931–1932
Werenka, Brad	(Canada)	D	1995–1996	3	9	0	0	0	8	—	—	—	—	—	
Wharram, Ken *	(Canada)	C/RW	1952–1969	11, 17, 21	766	252	281	533	220	80	16	27	43	38	SC 1961
White, Bill	(Canada)	D	1970–1976	2	415	30	149	179	336	73	4	25	29	64	
White, Peter	(Canada)	C	2001–2003	11, 16	54	3	4	7	10	—	—	—	—	—	
White, Todd	(Canada)	RW	1997–2000	26	43	6	8	14	22	—	—	—	—	—	
Wiebe, Art *	(Canada)	D	1932–1943	2, 10, 11	412	14	26	40	201	31	1	3	4	10	SC 1938
Wilkinson, Neil	(Canada)	D	1993–1994	23	72	3	9	12	116	4	0	0	0	0	
Williams, Jason	(Canada)	C	2006–2008	29	63	17	25	42	42	—	—	—	—	—	
Williams, Sean	(Canada)	C	1991–1992	53	2	0	0	0	4	—	—	—	—	—	
Wilson, Behn	(Canada)	D	1983–1988	23	262	39	106	145	607	24	4	5	9	72	
Wilson, Bob	(Canada)	D	1953–1954	21	1	0	0	0	0	—	—	—	—	—	
Wilson, Cully	(Canada)	RW	1926–1927	3	42	8	4	12	42	2	1	0	1	6	
Wilson, Doug	(Canada)	D	1977–1991	24	938	225	554	779	764	95	19	61	80	86	
Wilson, Johnny	(Canada)	LW	1955–1957	16	140	42	39	81	36	—	—	—	—	—	
Wilson, Larry	(Canada)	C	1953–1956	7, 16	131	21	44	65	61	—	—	—	—	—	
Wilson, Rik	(United States)	D	1987–1988	3, 44	14	4	5	9	6	—	—	—	—	—	
Wilson, Roger	(Canada)	D	1974–1975	6	7	0	2	2	6	—	—	—	—	—	
Wingels, Tommy	(United States)	C	2017–2018	57	57	7	5	12	43	—	—	—	—	—	
Wisniewski, James	(United States)	D	2005–2009	43	168	13	43	56	192	—	—	—	—	—	
Wiste, Jim	(Canada)	C	1968–1970	18, 22	29	0	8	8	8	—	—	—	—	—	
Witiuk, Steve	(Canada)	LW	1951–1952	9, 15	33	3	8	11	14	—	—	—	—	—	
Woit, Benny	(Canada)	D	1955–1957	6	72	1	8	9	48	—	—	—	—	—	
Wylie, Duane	(United States)	C	1974–1977	24, 27	14	3	3	6	2	—	—	—	—	—	
Yakubov, Mikhail	(Russia)	C	2003–2006	12, 36	40	2	9	11	16	—	—	—	—	—	
Yaremchuk, Ken	(Canada)	C	1983–1986	7, 15	188	30	43	73	78	19	6	6	12	37	
Yawney, Trent	(Canada)	D	1988–1991; 1997–1999	5, 8	280	16	55	71	398	41	6	15	21	55	
Young, Brian	(Canada)	D	1980–1981	25	8	0	2	2	6	—	—	—	—	—	
Young, Howie	(Canada)	D	1963–1964; 1968–1969	2, 3	96	3	14	17	166	—	—	—	—	—	
Ysebaert, Paul	(Canada)	LW	1993–1995	14	26	9	8	17	14	6	0	0	0	8	
Zadorov, Nikita	(Russia)	D	2020–2021	16	55	1	7	8	36	—	—	—	—	—	
Zaharko, Miles	(Canada)	D	1978–1982	7, 8, 26	58	4	13	17	58	2	0	0	0	0	
Zaitsev, Nikita	(Russia)	D	2022–2024	22	56	3	7	10	26	—	—	—	—	—	
Zeidel, Larry	(Canada)	D	1953–1954	6	64	1	6	7	102	—	—	—	—	—	
Zelepukin, Valeri	(Russia)	LW	2000–2001	29	36	3	4	7	18	—	—	—	—	—	
Zhamnov, Alexei	(Russia)	C	1996–2004	13, 26, 36	528	140	284	424	419	5	0	0	0	0	Captain 2002–2004
Zmolek, Doug	(United States)	D	1998–2000	4	105	2	21	23	162	—	—	—	—	—	
Zoborosky, Martin "Bus"	(Canada)	D	1944–1945	3	1	0	0	0	2	—	—	—	—	—	
Zyuzin, Andrei	(Russia)	D	2007–2008	27	32	2	3	5	38	—	—	—	—	—	

== Notes ==
- ^{a} Save percentage did not become an official NHL statistic until the 1982–83 season. Therefore, goaltenders who played before 1982 do not have official save percentages.
- ^{b} The seasons column lists the first year of the season of the player's first game and the last year of the season of the player's last game. For example, a player who played one game in the 2000–2001 NHL season would be listed as playing with the team from 2000 to 2001, regardless of what calendar year the game occurred within.
- ^{c} Moe Roberts, an assistant trainer for the team at the time, played twenty minutes after a knee injury forced Harry Lumley out of a game.
