= List of Chicago Blackhawks records =

This is a list of franchise records for the Chicago Blackhawks of the National Hockey League.

== Team records ==
=== Single season ===
Most points	112	2009–10
Most wins	52	2009–10
Most losses	51	1953–54
Most ties	23	1973–74
Most goals for	351	1985–86
Most goals against	363	1981–82
Fewest points	31	1953–54
Fewest wins	12	1953–54
Fewest losses	14	1973–74
Fewest ties	6	1989–90
Fewest goals for	133	1953–54
Fewest goals against	164	1973–74
Most penalty minutes	2663	1991–92
Most shutouts	15	1969–70

=== Single game ===
Most goals	12	Jan 30th 1969 versus the Flyers in Philadelphia
Biggest comeback	From 5–0 to Win	Oct 13th 2009 versus the Calgary Flames in Chicago
Longest shootout	11 Rounds	Dec 1st 2009 versus the Columbus Blue Jackets in Chicago

=== Streaks ===
Winning streaks
Overall	12	December 29, 2015 - January 19, 2016
Home	13	November 11, 1970 - December 20, 1970
Away	8	February 2, 2017 - March 4, 2017
Losing streaks
Overall	12	February 25, 1951 - March 25, 1951
Home	10	January 29, 1928 - March 21, 1928,
Away	19	November 10, 2003 - January 29, 2004
Undefeated streaks
Overall	30	March 27, 2012 - March 6, 2013 (24W, 6OTL)
Home	18	October 11, 1970 - December 20, 1970 (16W, 2T)
Away	18	March 16, 2012 - March 3, 2013 (14W, 4OTL)
Winless streaks
Overall	21	December 17, 1950 - January 28, 1951 (18L, 3T)
Home	15	December 16, 1928 - February 29, 1929 (11L, 4T)
Away	22	December 19, 1950 - March 25, 1951 (20L, 2T)

== Individual records ==
=== Career ===
Most seasons	22	Stan Mikita
Most games	1396	Stan Mikita
Most goals	604	Bobby Hull
Most assists	926	Stan Mikita
Most points	1467	Stan Mikita (541G, 926A)
Most penalty minutes	1495	Chris Chelios
Most shutouts	74	Tony Esposito
Most consecutive games played	884	Steve Larmer

=== Season ===
Most goals	58	Bobby Hull (1968-69)
Most assists	87	Denis Savard (1987-88)
Most points	131	Denis Savard (1987-88, 44G, 87A)
Point streak	26G	Patrick Kane (2015-16, 16G, 24A)
Most penalty minutes	408	Mike Peluso (1991–92)
Most shutouts	15	Tony Esposito (1969–70)

=== Single game ===
Most goals	5	Grant Mulvey (February 3, 1982)
Most assists	6	Pat Stapleton (March 30, 1969)
Most points	7	Max Bentley (January 28, 1943, 4G, 3A), Grant Mulvey (February 3, 1982, 5G, 2A)

¹ NHL Record

² Minimum 70-game schedule

== See also ==
- List of Chicago Blackhawks players
- List of NHL statistical leaders
- List of NHL players

== Notes and references ==
- blackhawks.nhl.com
