= Bob Beckett =

Canadian ice hockey player (1936–2019)

- Born: April 8, 1936 Unionville, Ontario, Canada
- Died: April 9, 2019 (aged 83)
- Height: 6 ft 0 in (183 cm)
- Weight: 185 lb (84 kg; 13 st 3 lb)
- Position: Centre
- Shot: Left
- Played for: Boston Bruins
- Playing career: 1953–1964

Robert Owen Beckett (April 8, 1936 – April 9, 2019) was a Canadian ice hockey centre. He played for the Boston Bruins of the National Hockey League between 1957 and 1964, as well as for the several teams of the minor leagues. He died in 2019.

== Career statistics ==
=== Regular season and playoffs ===
| | | | Regular season | | | | | Playoffs |
| Season | Team | League | GP | G | A | Pts | PIM | GP | G | A | Pts | PIM |
|---|---|---|---|---|---|---|---|---|---|---|---|---|
| 1954–55 | Galt Black Hawks | OHA | 49 | 16 | 22 | 38 | 0 | — | — | — | — | — |
| 1955–56 | Hershey Bears | AHL | 1 | 0 | 1 | 1 | 0 | — | — | — | — | — |
| 1955–56 | Barrie Flyers | OHA | 48 | 16 | 26 | 42 | 0 | — | — | — | — | — |
| 1956–57 | Victoria Cougars | WHL | 16 | 0 | 0 | 0 | 5 | — | — | — | — | — |
| 1956–57 | Quebec Aces | QHL | 26 | 9 | 15 | 24 | 6 | — | — | — | — | — |
| 1956–57 | Boston Bruins | NHL | 18 | 0 | 3 | 3 | 2 | — | — | — | — | — |
| 1957–58 | Boston Bruins | NHL | 9 | 0 | 0 | 0 | 2 | — | — | — | — | — |
| 1957–58 | Springfield Indians | AHL | 62 | 17 | 16 | 33 | 40 | 13 | 4 | 4 | 8 | 13 |
| 1958–59 | Providence Reds | AHL | 32 | 5 | 10 | 15 | 4 | — | — | — | — | — |
| 1958–59 | Quebec Aces | QHL | 25 | 6 | 5 | 11 | 5 | — | — | — | — | — |
| 1959–60 | Providence Reds | AHL | 57 | 11 | 31 | 42 | 12 | 5 | 1 | 3 | 4 | 2 |
| 1960–61 | Providence Reds | AHL | 72 | 22 | 34 | 56 | 28 | — | — | — | — | — |
| 1961–62 | Providence Reds | AHL | 27 | 13 | 15 | 28 | 21 | 3 | 1 | 1 | 2 | 0 |
| 1961–62 | Boston Bruins | NHL | 34 | 7 | 2 | 9 | 14 | — | — | — | — | — |
| 1962–63 | Providence Reds | AHL | 62 | 12 | 25 | 37 | 34 | 6 | 0 | 2 | 2 | 2 |
| 1963–64 | Providence Reds | AHL | 33 | 14 | 15 | 29 | 4 | — | — | — | — | — |
| 1963–64 | Boston Bruins | NHL | 7 | 0 | 1 | 1 | 0 | — | — | — | — | — |
| AHL totals | | | 346 | 94 | 147 | 241 | 143 | 27 | 6 | 10 | 16 | 17 |
| NHL totals | | | 68 | 7 | 6 | 13 | 18 | — | — | — | — | — |
