= Galt Black Hawks =

Canadian junior ice hockey team (1949–1955)

- City: Galt, Ontario
- League: Ontario Hockey Association
- Operated: 1949–1955
- Home arena: Galt Arena Gardens
- Parent club: Chicago Black Hawks

Franchise history
- 1943–1944: Galt Canadians
- 1944–1947: Galt Red Wings
- 1947–1949: Galt Rockets
- 1949–1955: Galt Black Hawks

The Galt Black Hawks were a junior ice hockey team based in Galt, Ontario, now a part of the city of Cambridge. They played in the Ontario Hockey Association from 1949 to 1955 and were operated as an affiliate of the Chicago Black Hawks. Their home arena was the Galt Arena Gardens.

The team originated as the Galt Canadians, then became Galt Red Wings when affiliated as a farm team for the Detroit Red Wings of the National Hockey League (NHL). Subsequently playing as the Galt Rockets when affiliated for two seasons with the Philadelphia Rockets of the American Hockey League, the team was sponsored by the Chicago Black Hawks from 1949 until 1955. When joint NHL sponsorship by Chicago and the Boston Bruins ended in 1955, the Black Hawks lost five players to the Barrie Flyers and ceased operation.

== Players ==
Left winger Bobby Hull played for Galt in 1954–55, and is the only alumnus in the Hockey Hall of Fame as a player. Former alumnus Murray Costello was inducted as a builder as the long-serving president of the Canadian Amateur Hockey Association. Left winger Jim McBurney won the Eddie Powers Memorial Trophy in 1952–53, as the OHA junior division scoring champion with 61 goals and 35 assists.

== NHL alumni ==
From the Galt Black Hawks, twenty-one players graduated to play in the National Hockey League (NHL):

- Bob Beckett
- Les Binkley
- Mike Buchanan
- Chick Chalmers
- Pete Conacher
- Murray Costello
- Warren Godfrey
- Bronco Horvath
- Bobby Hull
- Hec Lalande
- Jim McBurney
- Hillary Menard
- Tony Poeta
- Jack Price
- Matt Ravlich
- Len Ronson
- Don Simmons
- John Sleaver
- Floyd Smith
- Myron Stankiewicz
- Kenny Wharram
- Bob Wilson

== Season-by-season results ==
Regular season and playoffs results:

Legend: GP = Games played, W = Wins, L = Losses, T = Ties, Pts = Points, GF = Goals for, GA = Goals against

Memorial Cup champions	League champions	League finalists

Season	Regular season									Playoffs
Season	GP	W	L	T	Pts	Pct	GF	GA	Finish	Playoffs
1949–50	48	14	32	2	30	0.304	144	265	8th OHA	Did not qualify
1950–51	54	21	39	4	48	0.420	181	223	8th OHA	Lost quarterfinal (Barrie Flyers) 3–0
1951–52	54	35	17	2	72	0.673	307	213	3rd OHA	Lost quarterfinal (Toronto St. Michael's Majors 3–0
1952–53	56	27	26	3	57	0.509	242	225	5th OHA	Won quarterfinal (Oshawa Generals) 3–2; Lost semifinal (Toronto St. Michael's Majors 4–1–1
1953–54	59	21	37	1	43	0.362	204	288	8th OHA	Did not qualify
1954–55	49	18	25	6	42	0.419	181	203	6th OHA	Lost quarterfinal (Toronto Marlboros) 3–1
