= Tony Poeta =

Canadian ice hockey player

- Born: March 4, 1933; North Bay, Ontario, Canada
- Died: May 2, 2004 (aged 71); North Bay, Ontario, Canada
- Height: 5 ft 5 in (165 cm)
- Weight: 168 lb (76 kg; 12 st 0 lb)
- Position: Right wing
- Shot: Left
- Played for: Chicago Black Hawks
- Playing career: 1952–1960

Anthony Joseph Poeta (March 4, 1933 – May 2, 2004) was a Canadian ice hockey player. He played one game in the National Hockey League with the Chicago Black Hawks during the 1951–52 season, on February 17, 1952 against the Boston Bruins. The rest of his career, which lasted from 1952 to 1960, was spent in the minor leagues.

== Career statistics ==
=== Regular season and playoffs ===
			Regular season					Playoffs
Season	Team	League	GP	G	A	Pts	PIM	GP	G	A	Pts	PIM
1950–51	Galt Black Hawks	OHA	51	17	13	30	35	3	0	0	0	0
1951–52	Chicago Black Hawks	NHL	1	0	0	0	0	—	—	—	—	—
1951–52	Galt Black Hawks	OHA	51	27	28	55	31	3	4	0	4	2
1952–53	Barrie Flyers	OHA	54	29	35	64	49	15	10	9	19	27
1953–54	Cleveland Barons	AHL	2	0	0	0	2	5	1	0	1	2
1953–54	Marion Barons	IHL	55	29	35	64	37	5	3	3	6	6
1954–55	Valleyfield Braves	QSHL	11	1	1	2	0	—	—	—	—	—
1954–55	North Bay Trappers	NOHA	42	8	11	19	10	13	0	1	1	17
1955–56	North Bay Trappers	NOHA	25	5	4	9	8	—	—	—	—	—
1955–56	Stratford Indians	OHA Sr	24	3	8	11	4	7	0	0	0	)
1957–58	Belleville McFarlands	OHA Sr	7	1	1	2	2	—	—	—	—	—
1957–58	North Bay Trappers	OHA Sr	26	1	4	5	9	—	—	—	—	—
1958–59	North Bay Trappers	OHA Sr	54	15	22	37	31	—	—	—	—	—
1959–60	Greensboro Generals	EHL	13	0	6	6	5	—	—	—	—	—
1959–60	Milwaukee Falcons	IHL	29	6	9	15	35	—	—	—	—	—
1959–60	Johnstown Jets	EHL	3	0	0	0	0	—	—	—	—	—
OHA Sr totals			111	20	35	55	46	7	0	0	0	0
NHL totals			1	0	0	0	0	—	—	—	—	—

== See also ==
- List of players who played only one game in the NHL
