= Jack Price (ice hockey) =

Canadian ice hockey player

- Born: May 8, 1932; Goderich, Ontario, Canada
- Died: May 24, 2011 (aged 79); Boardman, Ohio, United States
- Height: 5 ft 9 in (175 cm)
- Weight: 180 lb (82 kg; 12 st 12 lb)
- Position: Defence
- Shot: Left
- Played for: Chicago Black Hawks
- Playing career: 1952–1964

John Rees "Jack" Price (May 8, 1932 — May 24, 2011) was a Canadian professional ice hockey defenceman who played 57 games in the National Hockey League for the Chicago Black Hawks between 1952 and 1954. The rest of his career, which lasted from 1952 to 1964, was spent in the minor leagues.

== Career statistics ==
=== Regular season and playoffs ===
			Regular season					Playoffs
Season	Team	League	GP	G	A	Pts	PIM	GP	G	A	Pts	PIM
1949–50	Galt Red Wings	OHA	45	7	6	13	102	—	—	—	—	—
1950–51	Galt Black Hawks	OHA	54	5	15	20	74	3	1	0	1	8
1951–52	Galt Black Hawks	OHA	53	7	28	35	102	3	0	1	1	0
1951–52	Chicago Black Hawks	NHL	1	0	0	0	0	—	—	—	—	—
1952–53	Chicago Black Hawks	NHL	10	0	0	0	2	4	0	0	0	0
1952–53	Chatham Maroons	OHA SR	46	15	19	34	98	—	—	—	—	—
1953–54	Chicago Black Hawks	NHL	46	4	6	10	22	—	—	—	—	—
1953–54	Ottawa Senators	QSHL	17	1	3	4	26	—	—	—	—	—
1954–55	Pittsburgh Hornets	AHL	57	3	8	11	78	10	0	0	0	6
1955–56	Winnipeg Warriors	WHL	3	0	0	0	6	—	—	—	—	—
1955–56	Pittsburgh Hornets	AHL	61	6	12	18	65	4	0	0	0	10
1956–57	Hershey Bears	AHL	64	4	21	25	56	7	0	2	2	14
1957–58	Hershey Bears	AHL	70	2	14	16	46	11	1	1	2	8
1958–59	Hershey Bears	AHL	65	2	7	9	44	13	0	1	1	10
1959–60	Hershey Bears	AHL	71	1	11	12	63	—	—	—	—	—
1960–61	Sudbury Wolves	EPHL	30	4	14	18	20	—	—	—	—	—
1960–61	Edmonton Flyers	WHL	37	1	6	7	14	—	—	—	—	—
1961–62	Pittsburgh Hornets	AHL	69	1	14	15	64	—	—	—	—	—
1962–63	Pittsburgh Hornets	AHL	22	1	5	6	14	—	—	—	—	—
1962–63	Edmonton Flyers	WHL	38	1	9	10	20	3	0	0	0	7
1962–63	Sarnia Rams	OHA Sr	8	1	2	3	30	—	—	—	—	—
1963–64	Windsor Bulldogs	IHL	7	1	1	2	5	—	—	—	—	—
AHL totals			479	20	92	112	430	45	1	4	5	48
NHL totals			57	4	6	10	24	4	0	0	0	0
