= Jim McBurney =

Canadian ice hockey player (1933–2019)

- Born: June 3, 1933; Sault Ste. Marie, Ontario, Canada
- Died: November 12, 2019 (aged 86); Sault Ste. Marie, Ontario, Canada
- Height: 5 ft 7 in (170 cm)
- Weight: 150 lb (68 kg; 10 st 10 lb)
- Position: Left wing
- Shot: Left
- Played for: Chicago Black Hawks
- Playing career: 1950–1959

James Raymond McBurney (June 3, 1933 – November 12, 2019) was a Canadian ice hockey left winger who played one game in the National Hockey League for the Chicago Black Hawks during the 1952–53 season, on February 7, 1953 against the Toronto Maple Leafs. He died on November 12, 2019.

== Career statistics ==
=== Regular season and playoffs ===
			Regular season					Playoffs
Season	Team	League	GP	G	A	Pts	PIM	GP	G	A	Pts	PIM
1950–51	Sault Ste. Marie Greyhounds	NOJHA	5	7	3	10	4	2	1	3	4	0
1951–52	Galt Black Hawks	OHA	47	35	31	66	27	3	2	1	3	0
1952–53	Galt Black Hawks	OHA	55	61	35	96	18	11	4	5	9	6
1953–54	Chicago Black Hawks	NHL	1	0	1	1	0	—	—	—	—	—
1953–54	Soo Greyhounds	NOHA	58	30	21	51	6	1	0	0	0	0
1954–55	Soo Greyhounds	NOHA	51	33	13	46	6	14	8	2	10	8
1955–56	Soo Greyhounds	NOHA	50	26	12	38	2	5	0	1	1	0
1957–58	Sault Ste. Marie Greyhounds	OHA Sr	47	17	11	28	10	4	1	0	1	0
1958–59	Sault Ste. Marie Greyhounds	OHA Sr	54	49	29	78	4	3	1	1	2	2
NHL totals			1	0	1	1	0	—	—	—	—	—

== See also ==
- List of players who played only one game in the NHL
