= List of members of the United States Hockey Hall of Fame =

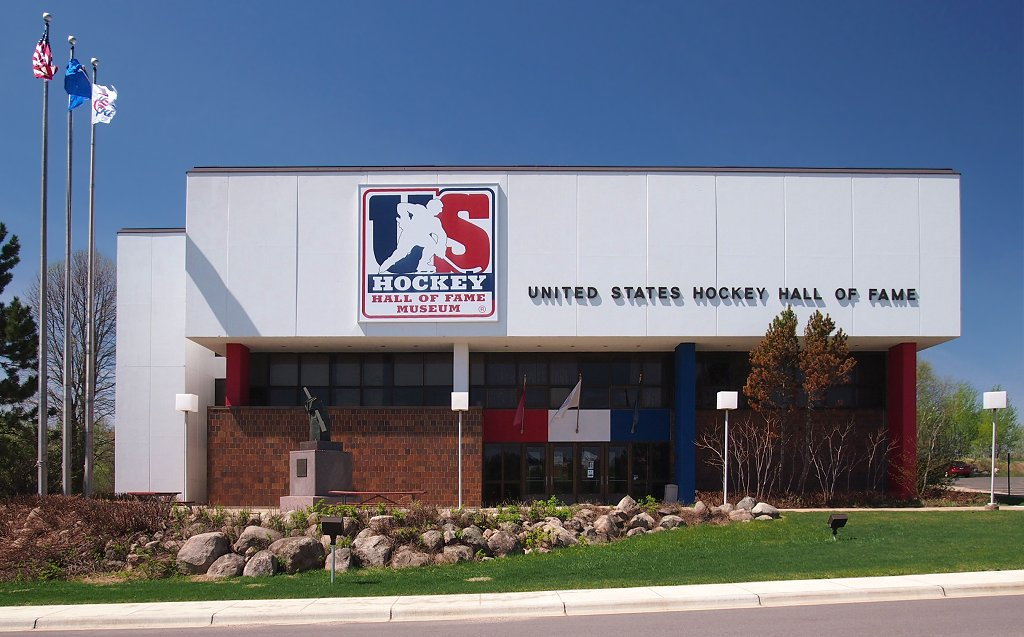
United States Hockey Hall of Fame

The United States Hockey Hall of Fame is located in Eveleth, Minnesota. It was established on June 21, 1973, with the purpose of honoring the sport of ice hockey in the United States by preserving American legends of the game. On May 11, 2007, USA Hockey and the United States Hockey Hall of Fame came to an agreement allowing the rights to the selection process and induction event associated to be handled by USA Hockey. After a class has been enshrined, anyone is allowed to nominate individuals to be considered for enshrinement in the following years class using the USA Hockey web site prior to the nomination deadline. Nominated individuals must be considered to have made an extraordinary contribution to the sport of ice hockey in America, but could come in any form such as player, coach, official, administrator or support personnel. A selection committee then reviews the nominations and decides who will be enshrined.

== Enshrinees ==
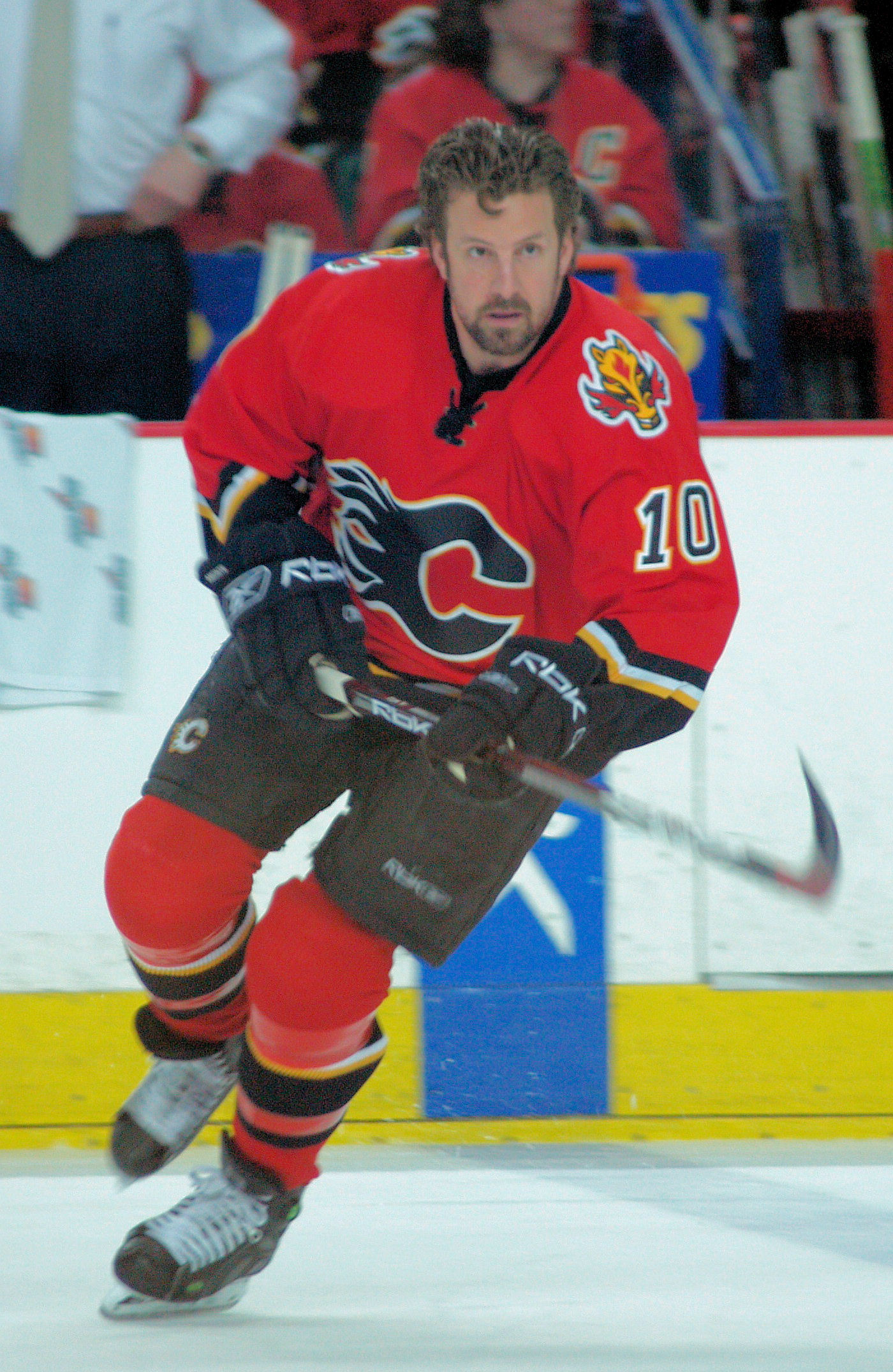
Tony Amonte was part of the 2009 Class

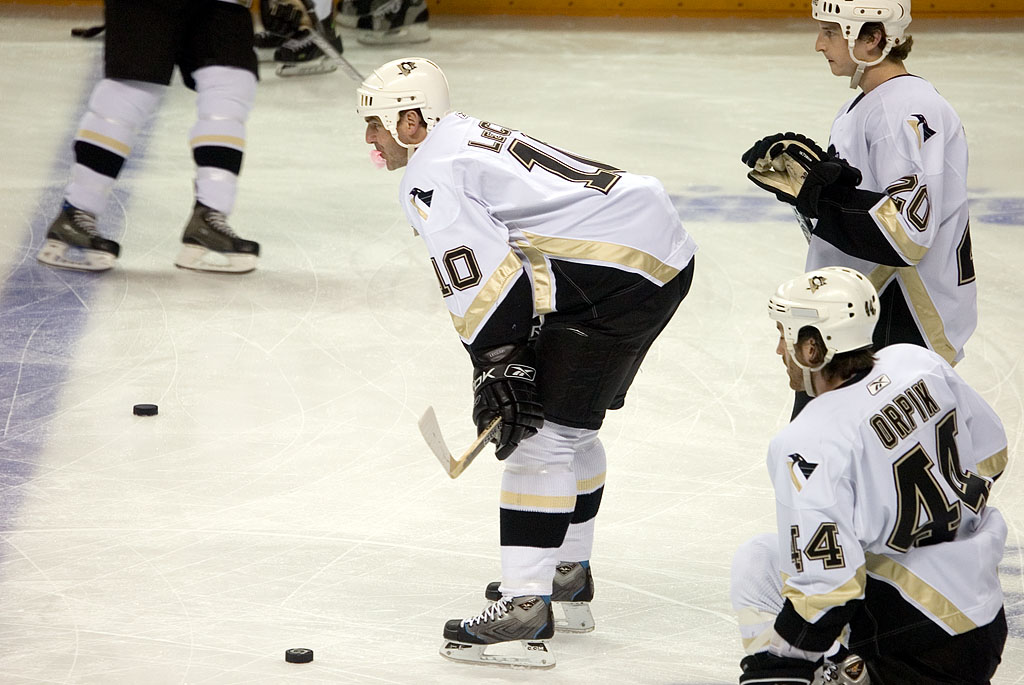
John LeClair (#10) was inducted in 2009

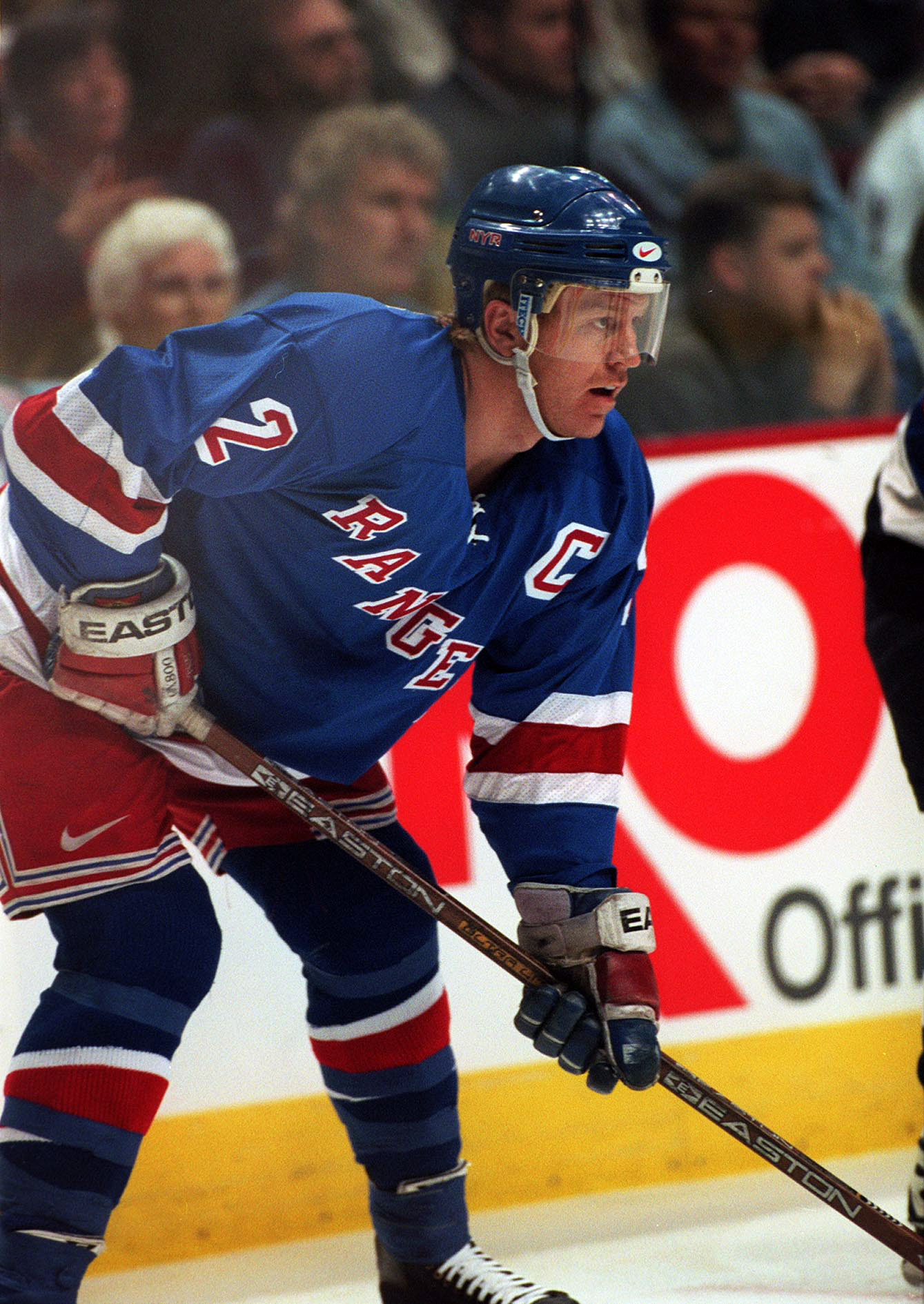
Brian Leetch was the first American to win the NHL's Conn Smythe Trophy as playoff MVP

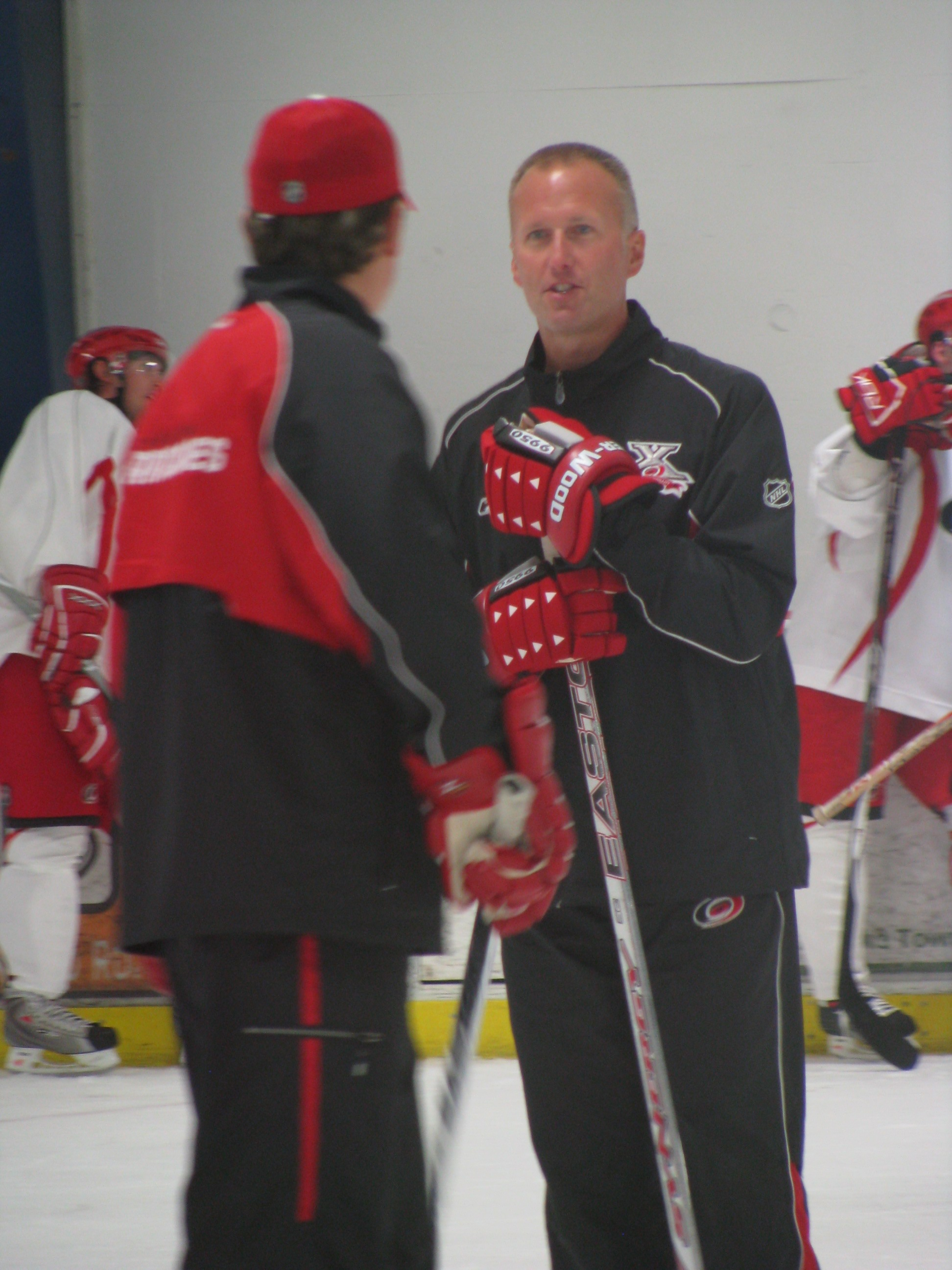
Tom Barrasso won two Stanley Cups for the Pittsburgh Penguins. He was part of the 2009 Class

Name^{†}	Year inducted	Place of birth
1960 Olympic Team	2000	—
1980 Olympic Team	2003	—
1996 World Cup of Hockey Team	2016	—
1998 Women's Olympic Team	2009	—
2002 Paralympic Sled Hockey Team	2024	—
Taffy Abel	1973	Michigan
Oscar Almquist	1983	Minnesota
Tony Amonte	2009	Massachusetts
Hobey Baker	1973	Pennsylvania
Tom Barrasso	2009	Massachusetts
Earl Bartholome	1977	North Dakota
Bill Belisle	2016	Rhode Island
Bruce Bennett	2025	New York
Gordon "Red" Berenson	2018	Saskatchewan, CAN
Art Berglund	2010	Ontario, CAN
Amo Bessone	1992	Massachusetts
Peter Bessone	1978	Massachusetts
Gary Bettman	2019	New York
Dean Blais	2020	Minnesota
Louis Robert "Bob" Blake	1985	Wisconsin
Henry Boucha	1995	Minnesota
Frank Brimsek	1973	Minnesota
Milton "Curly" Brink	2006	Minnesota
Herbert "Herb" Brooks	1990	Minnesota
Aaron Broten	2007	Minnesota
Neal Broten	2000	Minnesota
Dustin Brown	2023	New York
George Brown	1973	Massachusetts
Walter Brown (Son)	1973	Massachusetts
Brian Burke	2023	Rhode Island
Walter L. Bush, Jr.	1980	Minnesota
Karyn Bye-Dietz	2014	Wisconsin
Bobby Carpenter	2007	Massachusetts
Steve Cash	2022	Missouri
Joseph Cavanagh, Jr.	1994	Rhode Island
Len Ceglarski	1992	Massachusetts
William "Bill" Chadwick	1974	New York
Raymond Chaisson	1974	Massachusetts
John Chase	1973	Massachusetts
Chris Chelios	2011	Illinois
Dave Christian	2001	Minnesota
Roger Christian	1989	Minnesota
William "Billy" Christian	1984	Minnesota
Keith "Huffer" Christiansen	2005	Ontario, CAN
Donald "Don" Clark	1978	North Dakota
James Claypool	1995	Minnesota
Robert "Bob" Cleary	1981	Massachusetts
William "Bill" Cleary	1976	Massachusetts
Kevin Collins	2017	Massachusetts
Anthony "Tony" Conroy	1975	Minnesota
Paul Coppo	2004	Michigan
Matt Cullen	2024	Minnesota
Cindy Curley	2013	Massachusetts
John Cunniff	2003	Massachusetts
Mike "Lefty" Curran	1998	Minnesota
Carl "Cully" Dahlstrom	1973	Minnesota
Natalie Darwitz	2018	Minnesota
Brianna Decker	2024	Wisconsin
Ron DeGregorio	2015	New Hampshire
Victor "Vic" Desjardins	1974	Michigan
Richard Desmond	1988	Massachusetts
Robert "Bob" Dill	1979	Minnesota
Dick Dougherty	2003	Minnesota
Chris Drury	2015	Connecticut
Doug Everett	1974	Massachusetts
Mike Emrick	2011	Indiana
Stan Fischler	2021	New York
Robert "Robbie" Ftorek	1991	Massachusetts
James Fullerton	1992	Massachusetts
Mark Fusco	2002	Massachusetts
Scott Fusco	2002	Massachusetts
Gary Gambucci	2006	Minnesota
Sergio "Serge" Gambucci	1996	Minnesota
John Garrison	1973	Massachusetts
John "Jack" Garrity	1986	Massachusetts
John "Doc" Gibson	1973	Ontario, CAN
Brian Gionta	2019	New York
Francis "Moose" Goheen	1973	Minnesota
Scott Gomez	2025	Alaska
Malcolm Gordon	1973	Maryland
Wally Grant	1994	Minnesota
Cammi Granato	2008	Illinois
Tony Granato	2020	Illinois
Bill Guerin	2013	Massachusetts
Francis "Austie" Harding, Jr.	1975	Massachusetts
Ned Harkness	1994	Ontario, CAN
Leland "Hago" Harrington	2018	Massachusetts
Derian Hatcher	2010	Michigan
Kevin Hatcher	2010	Michigan
Neal Henderson	2019	United States Virgin Islands
Victor Heyliger	1974	Massachusetts
Paul Holmgren	2021	Minnesota
Charlie Holt	1997	Massachusetts
Phil Housley	2004	Minnesota
Mark Howe	2003	Michigan
Brett Hull	2008	Ontario, CAN
Stewart Iglehart	1975	Valparaíso Region, CHL
Willard Ikola	1990	Minnesota
Mike Ilitch	2004	Michigan
Craig Janney	2016	Connecticut
William "Bill" Jennings	1981	New York
Edward J. Jeremiah	1973	Massachusetts
Jim Johannson	2022	Minnesota
Mark Johnson	2004	Minnesota
Paul Johnson	2001	Minnesota
Robert "Badger Bob" Johnson	1991	Minnesota
Virgil Johnson	1974	Minnesota
Frank "Nick" Kahler	1980	Michigan
Mike Karakas	1973	Minnesota
Peter Karmanos, Jr.	2013	Michigan
John "Jack" Kelley	1993	Massachusetts
John "Snooks" Kelley	1974	Massachusetts
Amanda Kessel	2026	Wisconsin
Phil Kessel	2026	Wisconsin
Katie King Crowley	2023	New Hampshire
John "Jack" Kirrane	1987	Massachusetts
Pat LaFontaine	2003	Missouri
Lou Lamoriello	2012	Rhode Island
Jocelyne Lamoureux-Davidson	2022	North Dakota
Monique Lamoureux-Morando	2022	North Dakota
Myles Lane	1973	Massachusetts
Jamie Langenbrunner	2023	Minnesota
David Langevin	1993	Minnesota
Rod Langway	1999	Taipei, ROC
Reed Larson	1996	Minnesota
John LeClair	2009	Vermont
Brian Leetch	2008	Texas
Joe Linder	1975	Michigan
Tom Lockhart	1973	New York
Sam LoPresti	1973	Minnesota
Lane MacDonald	2005	Oklahoma
John MacInnes	2007	Ontario, CAN
John Mariucci	1973	Minnesota
Ron Mason	2013	Ontario, CAN
Calvin "Cal" Marvin	1982	Minnesota
John Matchefts	1991	Minnesota
Bruce Mather	1998	Massachusetts
John Mayasich	1976	Minnesota
John "Jack" McCartan	1983	Minnesota
Frederic McLaughlin	2024	Illinois
Peter McNab	2021	British Columbia, CAN
Mike Milbury	2006	Massachusetts
Ryan Miller	2022	Michigan
Mike Modano	2012	Michigan
William "Bill" Moe	1974	Massachusetts
Ken Morrow	1995	Michigan
Fred Mosely, Jr.	1975	Massachusetts
Tara Mounsey	2025	New Hampshire
Joe Mullen	1998	New York
Brian Murphy	2023	New Hampshire
Hugh "Muzz" Murray	1987	Michigan
Dr. V. George Nagobads	2010	Michigan
Lou Nanne	1998	Ontario, CAN
Hubert "Hub" Nelson	1978	Minnesota
William "Bill" Nyrop	1997	Washington, D.C.
Ed Olczyk	2012	Illinois
Edward "Eddie" Olson	1977	Michigan
T. J. Oshie	2026	Minnesota
George Owen	1973	Ontario, CAN
Doug Palazzari	2000	Minnesota
Winthrop "Ding" Palmer	1973	Connecticut
Robert "Bob" Paradise	1989	Minnesota
Zach Parise	2025	Minnesota
Jack Parker	2017	Massachusetts
Craig Patrick	1996	Michigan
Joe Pavelski	2025	Wisconsin
Larry Pleau	2000	Massachusetts
John "Connie" Pleban	1990	Minnesota
David Poile	2018	Ontario, CAN
Jenny Potter	2020	Minnesota
Clifford "Fido" Purpur	1974	North Dakota
Brian Rafalski	2014	Michigan
Mike Ramsey	2001	Minnesota
Mike Richter	2008	Pennsylvania
Robert Ridder, Sr.	1976	New York
Joe Riley	2002	Massachusetts
John "Jack" Riley Jr.	1979	Massachusetts
William "Bill" Riley	1977	Massachusetts
Gordie Roberts	1999	Michigan
Maurice "Moe" Roberts	2005	Connecticut
Jeremy Roenick	2010	Massachusetts
Elwin "Doc" Romnes	1973	Minnesota
Richard "Dick" Rondeau	1985	Rhode Island
Lawrence "Larry" Ross	1988	Minnesota
Angela Ruggiero	2015	California
Mathieu Schneider	2015	New York
Charles Schulz	1993	Minnesota
Jeff Sauer	2014	Wisconsin
Timothy Sheehy	1997	Ontario, CAN
Ben Smith	2017	Massachusetts
Ed Snider	2011	Washington, D.C.
Kevin Stevens	2024	Massachusetts
William "Bill" Stewart	1982	Massachusetts
Paul Stewart	2018	Massachusetts
Gary Suter	2011	Wisconsin
Ryan Suter	2026	Wisconsin
Tim Thomas	2019	Michigan
Cliff Thompson	1973	Massachusetts
Keith Tkachuk	2011	Massachusetts
William Thayer Tutt	1973	California
Hal Trumble	1985	Minnesota
Lou Vairo	2014	New York
John Vanbiesbrouck	2007	Michigan
Sid Watson	1999	Massachusetts
Doug Weight	2013	Michigan
Krissy Wendell-Pohl	2019	Minnesota
Thomas "Tommy" Williams	1981	Minnesota
Murray Williamson	2005	Manitoba, CAN
Ron Wilson	2017	Ontario, CAN
Alfred "Ralph" Winsor	1973	Massachusetts
Frank "Coddy" Winters	1973	Minnesota
William Wirtz	1984	Illinois
Stan Wong	2026	Florida
Doug Woog	2002	Minnesota
Lyle Wright	1973	Manitoba, CAN
Kenneth "Ken" Yackel	1986	Minnesota
Jerry York	2020	Massachusetts
Scott Young	2017	Massachusetts
Frank Zamboni	2009	Utah

^{†} Names appear as they are displayed in the United States Hockey Hall of Fame.

== See also ==
- List of NHL players
- List of members of the Hockey Hall of Fame
