= Rudy Ahlin =

American ice hockey player (1908–1976)

- Born: December 13, 1908 Eveleth, Minnesota, U.S.
- Died: May 6, 1976 (aged 67) Eveleth, Minnesota, U.S.
- Height: 5 ft 11 in (180 cm)
- Weight: 176 lb (80 kg; 12 st 8 lb)
- Position: Left wing
- Shot: Left
- Played for: Chicago Black Hawks
- Playing career: 1931–1942

Anthony Rudolph Ahlin (December 13, 1908 – May 6, 1976) was an American professional ice hockey left winger who played in one National Hockey League game for the Chicago Black Hawks during the 1937–38 season, on January 16, 1938 against the Toronto Maple Leafs. The rest of his career, which lasted from 1931 to 1942, was spent in the minor leagues.

== Career statistics ==
=== Regular season and playoffs ===
			Regular season					Playoffs
Season	Team	League	GP	G	A	Pts	PIM	GP	G	A	Pts	PIM
1931–32	Eveleth Rangers	CHL	33	12	7	19	22	3	1	1	2	4
1932–33	Eveleth Rangers	CHL	40	4	15	19	29	3	1	0	1	0
1933–34	Duluth Hornets	CHL	30	16	12	28	20	—	—	—	—	—
1933–34	Eveleth Rangers	CHL	10	0	0	0	0	—	—	—	—	—
1934–35	Eveleth Rangers	CHL	46	12	9	21	36	—	—	—	—	—
1935–36	Kansas City Greyhounds	AHA	47	15	9	24	34	—	—	—	—	—
1936–37	Kansas City Greyhounds	AHA	48	7	19	26	34	3	0	1	1	2
1937–38	Chicago Black Hawks	NHL	1	0	0	0	0	—	—	—	—	—
1937–38	Kansas City Greyhounds	AHA	47	6	18	24	29	—	—	—	—	—
1938–39	Kansas City Greyhounds	AHA	48	12	13	25	33	—	—	—	—	—
1939–40	Kansas City Greyhounds	AHA	41	10	15	25	16	—	—	—	—	—
1940–41	Kansas City Greyhounds	AHA	1	0	0	0	2	—	—	—	—	—
1940–41	Portage Lake Elks	NMHL	—	—	—	—	—	—	—	—	—	—
1941–42	Rivervale Skeeters	EAHL	56	20	13	33	45	7	1	4	5	0
AHA totals			232	50	74	124	148	3	0	1	1	2
NHL totals			1	0	0	0	0	—	—	—	—	—

== See also ==
- List of players who played only one game in the NHL
