= Oscar Hanson =

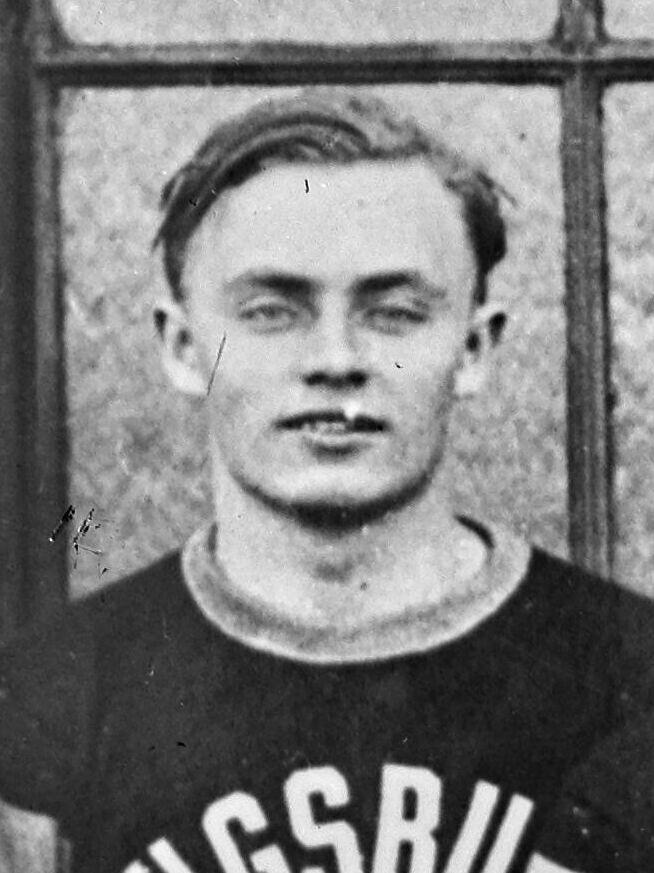
- Born: December 27, 1909; Camrose, Alberta
- Died: February 17, 1998 (aged 88)
- Height: 5 ft 10 in (178 cm)
- Weight: 175 lb (79 kg; 12 st 7 lb)
- Position: Centre
- Shot: Left
- Played for: Chicago Black Hawks
- Playing career: 1930–1944

Oscar Edward "Ossie, King Oscar" Hansen (December 27, 1909 – February 17, 1998) was a Canadian-born ice hockey centre. He played for the St. Louis Flyers, Minneapolis Millers and St. Paul Saints between 1930 and 1942, as well as eight games in the National Hockey League for the Chicago Black Hawks during the 1937–38 season.

== Biography ==
Oscar Hansen (most newspapers spelled the name Hanson) was the most news printed athlete in Minnesota during his time and was the AHA league scoring champion in 1936–37 with 33 Goals in 47 games (62 Points), and again in 1938–39 with 37 goals in 48 games (1938–39 Oscar had 89 Points). Oscar was the best of the six Hansen brothers (who all played for Augsburg College in Minnesota. The Hansen brothers were the first line for the American Olympic Team in 1928.

Oscar Hansen holds a college ice hockey record with three goals in one minute at Augsburg College in Minnesota (USA).

== Career statistics ==
=== Regular season and playoffs ===
			Regular season					Playoffs
Season	Team	League	GP	G	A	Pts	PIM	GP	G	A	Pts	PIM
1926–27	Augsburg University	NCAA-III	—	—	—	—	—	—	—	—	—	—
1927–28	Augsburg University	NCAA-III	—	—	—	—	—	—	—	—	—	—
1928–29	Augsburg University	NCAA-III	—	—	—	—	—	—	—	—	—	—
1930–31	St. Paul Saints	NWHL	—	—	—	—	—	—	—	—	—	—
1931–32	St. Paul Saints	CHL	35	25	18	43	29	—	—	—	—	—
1932–33	St. Paul Saints	CHL	37	22	17	39	63	4	2	0	2	4
1933–34	Oklahoma City Warriors	AHA	42	16	6	22	50	—	—	—	—	—
1934–35	St. Paul Saints	CHL	47	29	30	59	53	8	7	5	12	8
1935–36	St. Paul Saints	AHA	47	30	30	60	37	5	2	1	3	11
1936–37	St. Louis Flyers	AHA	47	33	29	62	25	6	4	3	7	14
1937–38	Chicago Black Hawks	NHL	8	0	0	0	0	—	—	—	—	—
1937–38	St. Louis Flyers	AHA	22	12	14	26	13	—	—	—	—	—
1937–38	Cleveland Barons	IAHL	21	3	3	6	0	2	0	0	0	0
1938–39	Minneapolis Millers	AHA	48	37	52	89	38	4	4	0	4	6
1939–40	Minneapolis Millers	AHA	47	32	22	54	27	3	0	1	1	0
1940–41	Minneapolis Millers	AHA	37	12	12	24	20	3	0	0	0	0
1941–42	Minneapolis Millers	AHA	47	24	20	44	24	—	—	—	—	—
1943–44	Flin Flon Bombers	SSHL	24	11	7	18	2	10	2	3	5	0
1943–44	Edmonton Victorias	ESrHL	—	—	—	—	—	—	—	—	—	—
1943–44	Edmonton Victorias	Al-Cup	—	—	—	—	—	4	0	0	0	0
AHA totals			337	196	185	381	234	21	10	5	15	31
NHL totals			8	0	0	0	0	—	—	—	—	—
