= Joe Papike =

American ice hockey player (1915–1967)

- Born: March 28, 1915 Eveleleth, Minnesota, United States
- Died: May 14, 1967 (aged 52)
- Height: 6 ft 0 in (183 cm)
- Weight: 175 lb (79 kg; 12 st 7 lb)
- Position: Right wing
- Shot: Right
- Played for: Chicago Black Hawks
- Playing career: 1931–1947

Joseph John Papike (March 28, 1915 – May 14, 1967) was an American ice hockey player who played 20 games in the National Hockey League with the Chicago Black Hawks from 1941 to 1944. The rest of his career, which lasted from 1931 to 1947, was spent in the minor leagues. Papike was born in Eveleth, Minnesota.

== Career statistics ==
=== Regular season and playoffs ===
| | | | Regular season | | | | | Playoffs |
| Season | Team | League | GP | G | A | Pts | PIM | GP | G | A | Pts | PIM |
|---|---|---|---|---|---|---|---|---|---|---|---|---|
| 1931–32 | Virginia Rockets | CHL | 31 | 15 | 4 | 19 | 17 | — | — | — | — | — |
| 1932–33 | Eveleth Rangers | CHL | 37 | 13 | 7 | 20 | 6 | 3 | 1 | 1 | 2 | 4 |
| 1933–34 | Eveleth Rangers | CHL | 43 | 13 | 6 | 19 | 17 | 3 | 0 | 1 | 1 | 2 |
| 1934–35 | Baltimore Orioles | EAHL | 20 | 7 | 3 | 10 | 10 | 9 | 2 | 5 | 7 | 0 |
| 1935–36 | Wichita Skyhawks | AHA | 47 | 11 | 9 | 20 | 19 | — | — | — | — | — |
| 1936–37 | Wichita Skyhawks | AHA | 48 | 22 | 15 | 37 | 6 | — | — | — | — | — |
| 1937–38 | Wichita Skyhawks | AHA | 47 | 22 | 22 | 42 | 12 | 4 | 0 | 0 | 0 | 0 |
| 1938–39 | Wichita Skyhawks | AHA | 44 | 12 | 12 | 24 | 2 | — | — | — | — | — |
| 1939–40 | Kansas City Greyhounds | AHA | 38 | 12 | 19 | 31 | 12 | — | — | — | — | — |
| 1940–41 | Chicago Black Hawks | NHL | 9 | 2 | 2 | 4 | 2 | 5 | 0 | 2 | 2 | 0 |
| 1940–41 | Kansas City Americans | AHA | 39 | 20 | 23 | 43 | 15 | — | — | — | — | — |
| 1941–42 | Chicago Black Hawks | NHL | 9 | 1 | 0 | 1 | 0 | — | — | — | — | — |
| 1941–42 | Kansas City Americans | AHA | 34 | 22 | 24 | 46 | 6 | 6 | 2 | 5 | 7 | 4 |
| 1944–45 | Chicago Black Hawks | NHL | 2 | 0 | 1 | 1 | 2 | — | — | — | — | — |
| 1946–47 | Duluth Coolerators | TBSHL | 8 | 11 | 7 | 18 | 0 | — | — | — | — | — |
| AHA totals | | | 297 | 121 | 124 | 245 | 72 | 10 | 2 | 5 | 7 | 4 |
| NHL totals | | | 20 | 3 | 3 | 6 | 4 | 5 | 0 | 2 | 2 | 0 |
