= List of NHL players (B) =

This is a list of National Hockey League (NHL) players who have played at least one game in the NHL from 1917 to present and have a last name that starts with "B".

List updated as of the 2023–24 NHL season.

== Ba ==
- Pete Babando
- Anton Babchuk
- Bob Babcock
- Warren Babe
- Yuri Babenko
- Mitch Babin
- John Baby
- Dave Babych
- Wayne Babych
- Jergus Baca
- Jason Bacashihua
- Ryan Bach
- Richard Bachman
- David Backes
- Johan Backlund
- Mikael Backlund
- Christian Backman
- Mike Backman
- Pete Backor
- Nicklas Backstrom
- Niklas Backstrom
- Ralph Backstrom
- Brandon Baddock
- Sven Baertschi
- Drew Bagnall
- Kevin Bahl
- Ace Bailey
- Bob Bailey
- Casey Bailey
- Garnet Bailey
- Josh Bailey
- Justin Bailey
- Reid Bailey
- Scott Bailey
- Joel Baillargeon
- Ken Baird
- Bill Baker
- Jamie Baker
- Steve Baker
- Peter Bakovic
- Chris Bala
- Jaroslav Balastik
- Rudolfs Balcers
- Helmuts Balderis
- Doug Baldwin
- Jozef Balej
- Mike Bales
- Earl Balfour
- Murray Balfour
- Terry Ball
- Keith Ballard
- Maxim Balmochnykh
- Dave Balon
- Bryon Baltimore
- Stan Baluik
- Carter Bancks
- Steve Bancroft
- Jeff Bandura
- Daniel Bang
- Frank Banham
- Darren Banks
- Murray Bannerman
- Drew Bannister
- Alexander Barabanov
- Ralph Barahona
- Ivan Baranka
- Ivan Barbashev
- Andy Barbe
- Bill Barber
- Don Barber
- Riley Barber
- Mark Barberio
- Cole Bardreau
- Bill Barilko
- Michal Barinka
- Cam Barker
- Doug Barkley
- Aleksander Barkov
- Bob Barlow
- Matthew Barnaby
- Blair Barnes
- Norm Barnes
- Stu Barnes
- Scott Barney
- Marco Baron
- Murray Baron
- Normand Baron
- Dave Barr
- Tom Barrasso
- Doug Barrault
- Alex Barre-Boulet
- Fred Barrett
- John Barrett
- Doug Barrie
- Len Barrie
- Tyson Barrie
- Justin Barron
- Morgan Barron
- Eddie Barry
- Marty Barry
- Ray Barry
- Lubos Bartecko
- Robin Bartel
- Matt Bartkowski
- Jim Bartlett
- Victor Bartley
- Cliff Barton
- Peter Bartos
- Milan Bartovic
- Oskars Bartulis
- Mathew Barzal
- Andrei Bashkirov
- Cody Bass
- Bob Bassen
- Hank Bassen
- Ryan Bast
- Nathan Bastian
- Baz Bastien
- Shawn Bates
- Frank Bathe
- Drake Batherson
- Andy Bathgate
- Frank Bathgate
- Bates Battaglia
- Jeff Batters
- Ruslan Batyrshin
- Bobby Bauer
- Garry Bauman
- Ken Baumgartner
- Nolan Baumgartner
- Bobby Baun
- Kyle Baun
- Sergei Bautin
- Robin Bawa
- Paul Baxter
- Ryan Bayda
- Gavin Bayreuther

== Be ==
- Sandy Beadle
- Jay Beagle
- Jake Bean
- Ethan Bear
- Frank Beaton
- Jack Beattie
- Francois Beauchemin
- J. C. Beaudin
- Nicolas Beaudin
- Norm Beaudin
- Eric Beaudoin
- Serge Beaudoin
- Yves Beaudoin
- Mark Beaufait
- Nathan Beaulieu
- Don Beaupre
- Stephane Beauregard
- Anthony Beauvillier
- Barry Beck
- Owen Beck
- Taylor Beck
- Bob Beckett
- Chris Beckford-Tseu
- Adam Beckman
- Connor Bedard
- Jim Bedard (born 1927)
- Jim Bedard (born 1956)
- Clayton Beddoes
- Jaroslav Bednar
- John Bednarski
- Kris Beech
- John Beecher
- Bob Beers
- Ed Beers
- Steve Begin
- Clarence Behling
- Marc Behrend
- Frank Beisler
- Derek Bekar
- Wade Belak
- Alain Belanger
- Eric Belanger
- Francis Belanger
- Jesse Belanger
- Ken Belanger
- Yves Belanger
- Roger Belanger
- Matt Beleskey
- Ed Belfour
- Michel Belhumeur
- Dan Belisle
- Jean Beliveau
- Billy Bell
- Brendan Bell
- Bruce Bell
- Gordie Bell
- Harry Bell
- Joe Bell
- Mark Bell
- Neil Belland
- Blake Bellefeuille
- Pete Bellefeuille
- Pierre-Edouard Bellemare
- Andy Bellemer
- Brett Bellemore
- Brian Bellows
- Kieffer Bellows
- Alex Belzile
- Emil Bemstrom
- Lin Bend
- Jan Benda
- Clint Benedict
- Matty Beniers
- Jamie Benn
- Jordie Benn
- Adam Bennett
- Beau Bennett
- Bill Bennett
- Curt Bennett
- Frank Bennett
- Harvey Bennett Jr.
- Harvey Bennett Sr.
- Max Bennett
- Rick Bennett
- Sam Bennett
- Brian Benning
- Jim Benning
- Matt Benning
- Andre Benoit
- Joe Benoit
- Simon Benoit
- Bill Benson
- Bobby Benson
- Tyler Benson
- Zach Benson
- Sean Bentivoglio
- Doug Bentley
- Max Bentley
- Reg Bentley
- Ladislav Benysek
- Paul Beraldo
- Josef Beranek
- Bryan Berard
- Drake Berehowsky
- Red Berenson
- Andrew Berenzweig
- Perry Berezan
- Sergei Berezin
- Aki Berg
- Bill Berg
- Todd Bergen
- Sean Bergenheim
- Mike Berger
- Jean-Claude Bergeron
- Marc-Andre Bergeron
- Michel Bergeron
- Patrice Bergeron
- Yves Bergeron
- Marc Bergevin
- Niclas Bergfors
- Jonatan Berggren
- Stefan Bergkvist
- Tim Bergland
- Bob Bergloff
- Bo Berglund
- Christian Berglund
- Patrik Berglund
- Gary Bergman
- Thommie Bergman
- Lean Bergmann
- Jonas Bergqvist
- Adam Berkhoel
- Matt Berlin
- Louis Berlinguette
- Jacob Bernard-Docker
- Tim Bernhardt
- Tim Berni
- Jonathan Bernier
- Serge Bernier
- Steve Bernier
- Reto Berra
- Bob Berry
- Brad Berry
- Doug Berry
- Fred Berry
- Ken Berry
- Rick Berry
- Daniel Berthiaume
- Adam Berti
- Eric Bertrand
- Christoph Bertschy
- Todd Bertuzzi
- Tyler Bertuzzi
- Craig Berube
- Jean-Francois Berube
- Phil Bessler
- Pete Bessone
- Allan Bester
- John Bethel
- Karel Betik
- Maxim Bets
- Silvio Bettio
- Blair Betts
- Jeff Beukeboom
- Bill Beveridge
- Nick Beverley

== Bi–Bl ==
- Dwight Bialowas
- Frank Bialowas
- Wayne Bianchin
- Antoine Bibeau
- Paul Bibeault
- Radim Bicanek
- Jiri Bicek
- Stu Bickel
- Bryan Bickell
- Todd Bidner
- Alex Biega
- Danny Biega
- Kevin Bieksa
- Zac Bierk
- Don Biggs
- Larry Bignell
- Chris Bigras
- Craig Billington
- Chad Billins
- Gilles Bilodeau
- Andre Binette
- Les Binkley
- Jordan Binnington
- Jack Bionda
- Brandon Biro
- Martin Biron
- Mathieu Biron
- Sebastien Bisaillon
- Jake Bischoff
- Ben Bishop
- Clark Bishop
- Tom Bissett
- Paul Bissonnette
- Anthony Bitetto
- William Bitten
- Dick Bittner
- Byron Bitz
- Anders Bjork
- Marcus Bjork
- Kasper Bjorkqvist
- Oliver Bjorkstrand
- Tobias Bjornfot
- Nick Bjugstad
- Scott Bjugstad
- James Black
- Steve Black
- Bob Blackburn
- Dan Blackburn
- Don Blackburn
- Jesse Blacker
- Colin Blackwell
- Mackenzie Blackwood
- Hank Blade
- Tom Bladon
- Garry Blaine
- Andy Blair
- Chuck Blair
- George "Dusty" Blair
- Sammy Blais
- Mike Blaisdell
- Bob Blake
- Hector "Toe" Blake
- Jackson Blake
- Jason Blake
- Mickey Blake
- Mike Blake
- Rob Blake
- Nicolas Blanchard
- Joseph Blandisi
- Nick Blankenburg
- Zdenek Blatny
- Anton Blidh
- Joachim Blichfeld
- Rick Blight
- Russ Blinco
- Mario Bliznak
- Ken Block
- Jeff Bloemberg
- Timo Blomqvist
- Arto Blomsten
- Mike Bloom
- Sylvain Blouin
- John Blue
- Teddy Blueger
- John Blum
- Jonathon Blum
- Matej Blumel
- Mike Blunden

== Bo ==
- Sergei Bobrovsky
- Brandon Bochenski
- Bob Bodak
- Gregg Boddy
- Doug Bodger
- Troy Bodie
- Gus Bodnar
- Andrew Bodnarchuk
- Mikkel Boedker
- Ron Boehm
- Garth Boesch
- Brock Boeser
- Zach Bogosian
- Eric Boguniecki
- Rick Boh
- Lonny Bohonos
- Alexandre Boikov
- Marc Boileau
- Patrick Boileau
- Rene Boileau
- Fred Boimistruck
- Gilles Boisvert
- Serge Boisvert
- Claude Boivin
- Leo Boivin
- Mike Boland (born 1954)
- Mike Boland (born 1949)
- Ivan Boldirev
- Alexandre Bolduc
- Dan Bolduc
- Michel Bolduc
- Samuel Bolduc
- Zachary Bolduc
- Matt Boldy
- Frank "Buzz" Boll
- Jared Boll
- Dave Bolland
- Brandon Bollig
- Larry Bolonchuk
- Hugh Bolton
- Brad Bombardir
- Dan Bonar
- Peter Bondra
- Brian Bonin
- Marcel Bonin
- Nick Bonino
- Radek Bonk
- Ryan Bonni
- Jason Bonsignore
- Dennis Bonvie
- Jim Boo
- Derek Boogaard
- Buddy Boone
- David Booth
- George Boothman
- Adam Boqvist
- Jesper Boqvist
- Chris Bordeleau
- J. P. Bordeleau
- Patrick Bordeleau
- Paulin Bordeleau
- Sebastien Bordeleau
- Thomas Bordeleau
- Casey Borer
- William Borgen
- Andreas Borgman
- Henrik Borgstrom
- Jack Borotsik
- Mark Borowiecki
- Luciano Borsato
- Nikolai Borschevsky
- Robert Bortuzzo
- Laurie Boschman
- Mike Bossy
- Helge "Bulge" Bostrom
- Mark Botell
- Tim Bothwell
- Jason Botterill
- Cam Botting
- Henry Boucha
- Dan Bouchard
- Dick Bouchard
- Edmond Bouchard
- Emile Bouchard
- Evan Bouchard
- Joel Bouchard
- Pierre Bouchard
- Pierre-Marc Bouchard
- Bill Boucher
- Brian Boucher
- Clarence Boucher
- Frank Boucher
- George Boucher
- Philippe Boucher
- Reid Boucher
- Robert Boucher
- Tyler Bouck
- Bruce Boudreau
- Andre Boudrias
- Barry Boughner
- Bob Boughner
- Francis Bouillon
- Jesse Boulerice
- Eric Boulton
- Lance Bouma
- Josef Boumedienne
- Dan Bourbonnais
- Rick Bourbonnais
- Conrad Bourcier
- Jean Bourcier
- Fred Bourdginon
- Luc Bourdon
- Marc-Andre Bourdon
- Leo Bourgeault
- Charlie Bourgeois
- Bob Bourne
- Michael Bournival
- Chris Bourque
- Claude Bourque
- Gabriel Bourque
- Mavrik Bourque
- Phil Bourque
- Ray Bourque
- Rene Bourque
- Ryan Bourque
- Pat Boutette
- Paul Boutilier
- Rollie Boutin
- Lionel Bouvrette
- Jay Bouwmeester
- Landon Bow
- Jason Bowen
- Johnny Bower
- Shane Bowers
- Madison Bowey
- Bill Bowler
- Drayson Bowman
- Kirk Bowman
- Ralph "Scotty" Bowman
- Jack Bownass
- Rick Bowness
- Darryl Boyce
- Johnny Boychuk
- Zach Boychuk
- Billy Boyd
- Dustin Boyd
- Irwin Boyd
- Randy Boyd
- Travis Boyd
- Wally Boyer
- Zac Boyer
- Brad Boyes
- Darren Boyko
- Brian Boyle
- Dan Boyle
- Kevin Boyle
- Nick Boynton
- Tyler Bozak
- Steve Bozek
- Philippe Bozon

== Br ==
- John Brackenborough
- Curt Brackenbury
- Barton Bradley
- Brian Bradley
- Lyle Bradley
- Matt Bradley
- Neil Brady
- Rick Bragnalo
- Andy Branigan
- Erik Brannstrom
- Per-Olov Brasar
- Donald Brashear
- Derick Brassard
- Fred Brathwaite
- Jesper Bratt
- Justin Braun
- Russ "Buster" Brayshaw
- Justin Brazeau
- Frank Breault
- Chris Breen
- Ken Breitenbach
- Pavel Brendl
- Dan Brennan
- Doug Brennan
- Kip Brennan
- Rich Brennan
- T. J. Brennan
- Tom Brennan
- John Brenneman
- Tim Brent
- Joe Bretto
- Carl Brewer
- Eric Brewer
- Andy Brickley
- Connor Brickley
- Daniel Brickley
- Archie Briden
- Mel Bridgman
- Daniel Briere
- Michel Briere
- Travis Brigley
- Aris Brimanis
- Frank Brimsek
- Rod Brind'Amour
- Doug Brindley
- Gavin Brindley
- David Brine
- Bobby Brink
- Milton Brink
- Guillaume Brisebois
- Patrice Brisebois
- Brendan Brisson
- Gerry Brisson
- Greg Britz
- Harry "Punch" Broadbent
- Alex Broadhurst
- Philip Broberg
- Martin Brochu
- Stephane Brochu
- Walter "Turk" Broda
- Connie Broden
- Ken Broderick
- Len Broderick
- Martin Brodeur
- Mike Brodeur
- Richard Brodeur
- T. J. Brodie
- Jonas Brodin
- Kyle Brodziak
- Jonny Brodzinski
- David Broll
- Mathias Brome
- Gary Bromley
- Sheldon Brookbank
- Wade Brookbank
- Bob Brooke
- Adam Brooks
- Alex Brooks
- Arthur Brooks
- Gord Brooks
- Ross Brooks
- Evan Brophey
- Bernie Brophy
- Frank Brophy
- Willie Brossart
- Laurent Brossoit
- Aaron Broten
- Neal Broten
- Paul Broten
- Julien Brouillette
- Paul Brousseau
- Troy Brouwer
- Adam Brown
- Andy Brown
- Arnie Brown
- Brad Brown
- Cam Brown
- Chris Brown
- Connie Brown
- Connor Brown
- Curtis Brown
- Dave Brown
- Doug Brown
- Dustin Brown
- Fred Brown
- George Brown
- Gerry Brown
- Greg Brown
- Harold Brown
- J. T. Brown
- Jeff Brown
- Jim Brown
- Josh Brown
- Keith Brown
- Ken Brown
- Kevin Brown
- Larry Brown
- Logan Brown
- Mike Brown (born 1979)
- Mike Brown (born 1985)
- Patrick Brown
- Rob Brown
- Sean Brown
- Stan Brown
- Wayne "Weiner" Brown
- Cecil Browne
- Jack Brownschidle
- Jeff Brownschidle
- Jeff Brubaker
- David Bruce
- Gordon Bruce
- Morley Bruce
- Gilbert Brule
- Steve Brule
- Murray Brumwell
- Damien Brunner
- Fabian Brunnstrom
- Benoit Brunet
- Ed Bruneteau
- Modere "Mud" Bruneteau
- Mario Brunetta
- Andrew Brunette
- Bill Brydge
- Paul Brydges
- Glen Brydson
- Gord Brydson
- Sergei Brylin
- Jacob Bryson
- Ilya Bryzgalov

== Bu ==
- Jiri Bubla
- Al Buchanan
- Jeff Buchanan
- Mike Buchanan
- Ralph "Bucky" Buchanan
- Ron Buchanan
- Kelly Buchberger
- Pavel Buchnevich
- Johnny Bucyk
- Randy Bucyk
- Peter Budaj
- Doug Buhr
- Tony Bukovich
- Jan Bulis
- Mike Bullard
- Hy Buller
- Ted Bulley
- Bruce Bullock
- Brett Bulmer
- Connor Bunnaman
- Michael Bunting
- Tyler Bunz
- Andre Burakovsky
- Robert Burakovsky
- Billy Burch
- Fred "Skippy" Burchell
- Glen Burdon
- Pavel Bure
- Valeri Bure
- Marc Bureau
- Bill Burega
- Erik Burgdoerfer
- Adam Burish
- Callahan Burke
- Eddie Burke
- Marty Burke
- Sean Burke
- Roy Burmister
- Alexander Burmistrov
- Kelly Burnett
- Bobby Burns
- Brent Burns
- Charlie Burns
- Gary Burns
- Norm Burns
- Robin Burns
- Shawn Burr
- Randy Burridge
- Kyle Burroughs
- Alex Burrows
- Dave Burrows
- Burt Burry
- Adam Burt
- Cummy Burton
- Nelson Burton
- Eddie Bush
- Rod Buskas
- Mike Busniuk
- Ron Busniuk
- Walter Buswell
- Garth Butcher
- Will Butcher
- Sven Butenschon
- Bobby Butler
- Cameron Butler
- Chris Butler
- Dick Butler
- Jerry Butler
- Vyacheslav Butsayev
- Yuri Butsayev
- Bill Butters
- Gordon Buttrey
- Gordon Buynak
- Petr Buzek
- Stephen Buzinski

== By ==
- Ilya Byakin
- John Byce
- Dane Byers
- Gordie Byers
- Jerry Byers
- Lyndon Byers
- Mike Byers
- Quinton Byfield
- Dustin Byfuglien
- Dmitry Bykov
- Dan Bylsma
- Bowen Byram
- Shawn Byram
- Paul Byron

== See also ==
- hockeydb.com NHL Player List - B
