= Virgil Johnson (ice hockey) =

American ice hockey player (1909–1993)

- Hockey Hall of Fame, 1974
- Born: March 4, 1909 Minneapolis, Minnesota, U.S.
- Died: September 9, 1993 (aged 84)
- Height: 5 ft 9 in (175 cm)
- Weight: 165 lb (75 kg; 11 st 11 lb)
- Position: Defence
- Shot: Left
- Played for: Chicago Black Hawks
- Playing career: 1931–1951

Virgil Sylvester Johnson (March 4, 1909 – September 9, 1993) was an American ice hockey player.

== Career ==
Johnson played 76 games in the National Hockey League with the Chicago Black Hawks between 1938 and 1944, winning the Stanley Cup in 1938. The rest of his career, which lasted from 1931 to 1951, was mainly spent in the American Hockey Association. He was inducted into the United States Hockey Hall of Fame in 1974.

== Career statistics ==
=== Regular season and playoffs ===
			Regular season					Playoffs
Season	Team	League	GP	G	A	Pts	PIM	GP	G	A	Pts	PIM
1930–31	Minneapolis Americans	NWHL	—	—	—	—	—	—	—	—	—	—
1931–32	Minneapolis Millers	CHL	34	9	4	13	24	—	—	—	—	—
1932–33	Minneapolis Millers	CHL	39	6	8	14	30	7	0	1	1	11
1933–34	Minneapolis Millers	CHL	36	9	13	22	21	3	0	2	2	2
1934–35	St. Paul Saints	CHL	45	6	13	19	35	8	2	5	7	8
1935–36	St. Paul Saints	AHA	47	9	20	29	14	5	0	1	1	4
1936–37	St. Paul Saints	AHA	48	4	15	19	35	3	0	2	2	4
1937–38	Chicago Black Hawks	NHL	25	0	2	2	2	10	0	0	0	0
1937–38	St. Paul Saints	AHA	24	2	6	8	14	—	—	—	—	—
1938–39	St. Paul Saints	AHA	48	5	12	17	22	3	1	0	1	0
1939–40	St. Paul Saints	AHA	45	6	16	22	15	7	0	1	1	6
1940–41	St. Paul Saints	AHA	48	6	15	21	14	4	0	0	0	4
1941–42	St. Paul Saints	AHA	49	8	17	25	18	2	1	0	1	0
1942–43	Hershey Bears	AHL	53	4	19	23	10	6	0	4	4	0
1943–44	Chicago Black Hawks	NHL	49	1	8	9	23	9	0	3	3	4
1944–45	Chicago Black Hawks	NHL	2	0	1	1	2	—	—	—	—	—
1944–45	Cleveland Barons	AHL	26	2	5	7	10	8	0	0	0	2
1945–46	Minneapolis Millers	USHL	53	9	17	26	12	—	—	—	—	—
1946–47	Minneapolis Millers	USHL	51	2	19	21	30	3	0	0	0	2
1949–50	Minneapolis Jerseys	AAHL	8	1	5	6	0	—	—	—	—	—
1950–51	Minneapolis Jerseys	AAHL	18	2	19	21	2	3	0	2	2	0
AHA totals			309	40	101	141	132	24	2	4	6	18
NHL totals			76	1	11	12	27	16	0	3	3	4
