= Joe Bretto =

American ice hockey player (1912–2007)

- Born: November 28, 1912; Hibbing, Minnesota, U.S.
- Died: January 27, 2007 (aged 94); Hibbing, Minnesota, U.S.
- Height: 6 ft 1 in (185 cm)
- Weight: 248 lb (112 kg; 17 st 10 lb)
- Position: Defense
- Shot: Left
- Played for: Chicago Black Hawks
- Playing career: 1931–1946

Joseph Thomas "Brute" Bretto (November 28, 1912 – January 27, 2007) was an American professional ice hockey defenseman who played three games in the National Hockey League with the Chicago Black Hawks during the 1944–45 season. Bretto spent most of his career, which lasted from 1931 to 1946, in various minor leagues.

== Career statistics ==
=== Regular season and playoffs ===
			Regular season					Playoffs
Season	Team	League	GP	G	A	Pts	PIM	GP	G	A	Pts	PIM
1931–32	Hibbing Maroons	CHL	36	6	1	7	48	—	—	—	—	—
1932–33	Hibbing Maroons	CHL	40	7	9	16	96	—	—	—	—	—
1933–34	Hibbing Miners	CHL	29	10	5	15	141	6	0	1	1	14
1933–34	Boston Tigers	Can-Am	4	0	0	0	2	—	—	—	—	—
1934–35	Boston Tigers	Can-Am	7	0	0	0	0	—	—	—	—	—
1934–35	Minneapolis Millers	CHL	43	3	4	7	86	5	3	2	5	8
1935–36	Detroit Olympics	IHL	4	1	0	1	0	—	—	—	—	—
1935–36	Windsor Bulldogs	IHL	41	5	7	12	32	8	1	0	1	8
1936–37	Cleveland Falcons	IAHL	47	2	8	10	41	—	—	—	—	—
1937–38	Cleveland Barons	IAHL	1	0	0	0	15	—	—	—	—	—
1937–38	Minneapolis Millers	AHA	38	8	11	19	70	7	2	2	4	22
1938–39	St. Paul Saints	AHA	44	8	8	16	39	3	0	6	6	0
1939–40	St. Paul Saints	AHA	46	14	12	26	66	7	1	6	7	8
1940–41	St. Paul Saints	AHA	48	5	10	15	64	4	1	0	1	2
1941–42	St. Paul Saints	AHA	29	6	5	11	44	—	—	—	—	—
1944–45	Chicago Black Hawks	NHL	3	0	0	0	4	—	—	—	—	—
1945–46	St. Paul Saints	USHL	3	0	1	1	0	—	—	—	—	—
AHA totals			205	41	46	87	283	21	4	14	18	32
NHL totals			3	0	0	0	4	—	—	—	—	—
