= Stewart Adams (ice hockey) =

Canadian ice hockey player

- Born: September 16, 1904; Calgary, Northwest Territories, Canada
- Died: May 18, 1978 (aged 73); Calgary, Alberta, Canada
- Height: 5 ft 10 in (178 cm)
- Weight: 165 lb (75 kg; 11 st 11 lb)
- Position: Left wing
- Shot: Left
- Played for: Chicago Black Hawks; Toronto Maple Leafs
- Playing career: 1925–1936

Stewart Alexander Adams (September 16, 1904 in Calgary, Northwest Territories – May 18, 1978 in Calgary, Alberta) was a professional ice hockey player in the National Hockey League. He played for the Chicago Black Hawks and Toronto Maple Leafs between 1929 and 1933.

== Playing career ==
He began his NHL career with the Chicago Black Hawks in 1929–30 and played there for three seasons. For the 1932–33 NHL season, he left Chicago for Toronto and played for the Maple Leafs. In 93 NHL games, he scored 9 goals and 35 points.

== Career statistics ==
=== Regular season and playoffs ===
			Regular season					Playoffs
Season	Team	League	GP	G	A	Pts	PIM	GP	G	A	Pts	PIM
1921–22	Calgary Hustlers	CCJHL	—	—	—	—	—	—	—	—	—	—
1921–22	Calgary Hustlers	M-Cup	—	—	—	—	—	3	1	0	1	0
1922–23	Calgary Canadians	CCJHL	12	3	5	8	8	—	—	—	—	—
1922–23	Calgary Canadians	M-Cup	—	—	—	—	—	4	0	0	0	0
1923–24	Calgary Canadians	CCJHL	—	—	—	—	—	—	—	—	—	—
1923–24	Calgary Canadians	M-Cup	—	—	—	—	—	7	8	5	13	2
1924–25	Calgary Canadians	CCJHL	—	—	—	—	—	—	—	—	—	—
1924–25	Calgary Canadians	M-Cup	—	—	—	—	—	2	0	0	0	6
1925–26	Minneapolis Millers	CHL	5	1	0	1	3	—	—	—	—	—
1926–27	Minneapolis Millers	AHA	32	2	4	6	15	6	1	0	1	2
1927–28	Minneapolis Millers	AHA	38	4	3	7	24	8	1	0	1	8
1928–29	Minneapolis Millers	AHA	40	11	8	19	41	4	0	0	0	4
1929–30	Chicago Black Hawks	NHL	24	4	6	10	16	2	0	0	0	6
1929–30	Minneapolis Millers	AHA	16	8	4	12	4	—	—	—	—	—
1930–31	Chicago Black Hawks	NHL	35	5	13	18	18	9	3	3	6	8
1930–31	London Tecumsehs	IHL	3	1	0	1	2	—	—	—	—	—
1931–32	Chicago Black Hawks	NHL	26	0	5	5	26	—	—	—	—	—
1932–33	Toronto Maple Leafs	NHL	8	0	2	2	0	—	—	—	—	—
1932–33	Syracuse Stars	IHL	36	11	22	33	48	6	0	1	1	6
1933–34	Minneapolis Millers	CHL	43	22	8	30	40	3	0	3	3	—
1934–35	Calgary Tigers	NWHL	8	5	6	11	13	—	—	—	—	—
1935–36	Calgary Tigers	NWHL	29	11	7	18	16	—	—	—	—	—
NHL totals			93	9	26	35	60	11	3	3	6	14
