= Fido Purpur =

American ice hockey player (1914–2001)

- Born: September 26, 1914 Grand Forks, North Dakota, U.S.
- Died: February 21, 2001 (aged 86) Grand Forks, North Dakota, U.S.
- Height: 5 ft 5 in (165 cm)
- Weight: 155 lb (70 kg; 11 st 1 lb)
- Position: Right wing
- Shot: Left
- Played for: St. Louis Eagles; Chicago Black Hawks; Detroit Red Wings
- Playing career: 1933–1947
- Coaching career

Coaching career (HC unless noted)
- 1949–1956: North Dakota

Head coaching record
- Overall: 94–75–6 (.554)

Clifford Joseph "Fido" Purpur (September 26, 1914 – February 21, 2001) was an American ice hockey player who played five seasons in the National Hockey League for the St. Louis Eagles, Chicago Black Hawks, and Detroit Red Wings between 1934 and 1945. He also played several years of minor hockey, primarily with the St. Louis Flyers of the American Hockey Association. After retiring he became a coach, and led the University of North Dakota from 1949 to 1956.

== Career ==
Purpur played for the Minneapolis Millers winning a CHL championship in 1934 and went on to play 25 games for the St. Louis Eagles the following season becoming the first person born in North Dakota to play in the National Hockey League. After the Eagles folded the players were disbanded to other NHL teams and Purpur was selected by Toronto. If the NHL ever resold the franchise, proceeds were to go to the Ottawa Hockey Association. Rather than join the Leafs Purpur remained in Missouri and signed on with the AHA's St. Louis Flyers. Purpur played the next six seasons with the Flyers, winning five regular season titles and four league championships while being one of the top scorers for the team. In 1941 Purpur left St. Louis and joined the Kansas City Americans but received a brief call-up for his second stint in the NHL for the Chicago Black Hawks. In 8 games Purpur recorded no points and he was returned to Kansas City for the remainder of the year.

Due to America's entry into World War II several NHL rosters were depleted of talent and the league scrambled to find replacements. Chicago brought Purpur back and this time he was able to play a full 50-game season, posting 13 goals and 16 assists but Chicago missed out on the playoffs by 1 point when they lost the final two games of the year. Purpur was finally able to make his playoff debut for the Black Hawks the next year and, while his team made the finals, they were swept out by the Montreal Canadiens. Purpur split his time in 1944-45 between Chicago and Indianapolis of the newly-formed AHL but after the Capitals bowed out in the first round of the playoffs Purpur made his final appearance in the NHL by appearing in seven playoff games for the Detroit Red Wings. with the war over in 1945 Purpur returned to the minors and finished his playing career in 1947.

== Coaching career ==
A few years after retiring Purpur returned to North Dakota to take over the program at UND. Purpur would spend seven seasons with the Fighting Sioux and shepherded the team through the early years of conference play. His best season came in 1952–53 with a 15-5 record and a third-place finish in the MCHL. He was inducted into the United States Hockey Hall of Fame in 1974 and was awarded North Dakota's highest honor, the Roughrider Award in 1981. During his coaching career, Purpur coached his younger brother Ken. In 1988, he received the Hobey Baker Legends of College Hockey Award.

== Career statistics ==
=== Regular season and playoffs ===
			Regular season					Playoffs
Season	Team	League	GP	G	A	Pts	PIM	GP	G	A	Pts	PIM
1931–32	Grand Forks Falcons	HS-ND	—	—	—	—	—	—	—	—	—	—
1932–33	Minneapolis Millers	CHL	37	13	3	16	13	7	1	1	2	6
1933–34	Minneapolis Millers	CHL	44	15	10	25	79	3	2	1	3	2
1934–35	Minneapolis Millers	CHL	14	4	2	6	29	—	—	—	—	—
1934–35	St. Louis Eagles	NHL	25	1	2	3	8	—	—	—	—	—
1935–36	St. Louis Flyers	AHA	47	13	5	18	34	7	1	3	4	2
1936–37	St. Louis Flyers	AHA	32	7	15	22	29	6	2	3	5	2
1937–38	St. Louis Flyers	AHA	48	23	15	38	15	7	0	3	3	4
1938–39	St. Louis Flyers	AHA	48	35	43	78	34	7	3	3	6	4
1939–40	St. Louis Flyers	AHA	46	32	38	70	44	5	1	3	4	4
1940–41	St. Louis Flyers	AHA	46	25	16	41	32	9	5	0	5	4
1941–42	Chicago Black Hawks	NHL	8	0	0	0	0	—	—	—	—	—
1941–42	Kansas City Americans	AHA	39	18	30	48	19	6	10	5	15	10
1942–43	Chicago Black Hawks	NHL	50	13	16	29	14	—	—	—	—	—
1943–44	Chicago Black Hawks	NHL	40	9	10	19	13	9	1	1	2	0
1944–45	Chicago Black Hawks	NHL	21	2	7	9	11	—	—	—	—	—
1944–45	Indianapolis Capitals	AHL	26	8	14	22	10	5	1	2	3	2
1944–45	Detroit Red Wings	NHL	—	—	—	—	—	7	0	1	1	4
1945–46	St. Louis Flyers	AHL	56	18	15	33	21	—	—	—	—	—
1946–47	St. Paul Saints	USHL	56	15	23	38	16	—	—	—	—	—
AHA totals			306	153	162	315	207	47	22	20	42	30
NHL totals			144	25	35	60	46	16	1	2	3	4

== Head coaching record ==
Record table
Season	Team	Overall	Conference	Standing	Postseason
North Dakota Fighting Sioux Independent (1949–1951)
1949–50	North Dakota	15–6–2			
1950–51	North Dakota	12–12–2			
North Dakota:		27–18–4			
North Dakota Fighting Sioux (MCHL) (1951–1953)
1951–52	North Dakota	13–11–1	6–6–0	4th	
1952–53	North Dakota	15–5–0	11–5–0	3rd	
North Dakota:		28–16–1	17–11–0		
North Dakota Fighting Sioux (WIHL) (1953–1956)
1953–54	North Dakota	14–12–1	9–6–1	3rd	
1954–55	North Dakota	14–13–1	9–12–1	6th	
1955–56	North Dakota	11–16–1	7–13–0	t-5th	
North Dakota:		39–41–3	23–31–2		
Total:		94–75–8			
National champion Postseason invitational champion Conference regular season champion Conference regular season and conference tournament champion Division regular season champion Division regular season and conference tournament champion Conference tournament champion

Sporting positions
Preceded by Don Norman	Head coach of the University of North Dakota; 1949–1956	Succeeded by Al Renfrew
Awards and achievements
Preceded by Murray Murdoch	Hobey Baker Legends of College Hockey Award; 1988	Succeeded by Jim Fullerton
