= Pat Shea (ice hockey) =

American ice hockey player

- Born: October 29, 1911 Potlatch, Idaho, United States
- Died: December 16, 1978 (aged 67) Boise, Idaho, United States
- Height: 5 ft 10 in (178 cm)
- Weight: 190 lb (86 kg; 13 st 8 lb)
- Position: Defense
- Shot: Left
- Played for: Chicago Black Hawks
- Playing career: 1931–1948

Francis Patrick Shea (October 29, 1911 – December 16, 1978) was an American ice hockey defenseman. He played ten games in the National Hockey League with the Chicago Black Hawks during the 1931–32 season. The rest of his career, which lasted from 1931 to 1942, was spent in the minor leagues. He was born in Potlatch, Idaho and grew up in White Bear Lake, Minnesota.

== Career statistics ==
=== Regular season and playoffs ===
			Regular season					Playoffs
Season	Team	League	GP	G	A	Pts	PIM	GP	G	A	Pts	PIM
1930–31	White Bear High School	HS-MN	—	—	—	—	—	—	—	—	—	—
1931–32	Chicago Black Hawks	NHL	10	0	1	1	0	—	—	—	—	—
1931–32	Pittsburgh Yellow Jackets	IHL	3	0	0	0	0	—	—	—	—	—
1932–33	Tulsa Oilers	AHA	39	8	8	16	37	4	0	1	1	10
1933–34	Minneapolis Millers	CHL	40	5	7	12	88	3	3	0	3	4
1934–35	Minneapolis Millers	CHL	46	6	13	19	38	5	0	0	0	4
1935–36	Kansas City Greyhounds	AHA	41	10	9	19	33	—	—	—	—	—
1935–36	Rochester Cardinals	IHL	8	0	2	2	6	—	—	—	—	—
1936–37	Kansas City Greyhounds	AHA	40	2	6	8	26	3	0	0	0	11
1937–38	Kansas City Greyhounds	AHA	46	11	12	23	73	—	—	—	—	—
1938–39	Kansas City Greyhounds	AHA	48	13	14	27	58	—	—	—	—	—
1939–40	Minneapolis Millers	AHA	48	12	13	25	57	3	2	0	2	5
1940–41	Minneapolis Millers	AHA	45	7	8	15	25	3	0	0	0	0
1941–42	Minneapolis Millers	AHA	46	2	11	13	38	—	—	—	—	—
AHA totals			353	65	81	146	347	13	2	1	3	26
NHL totals			10	0	1	1	0	—	—	—	—	—
