= Lloyd Andrews (ice hockey) =

Canadian ice hockey player

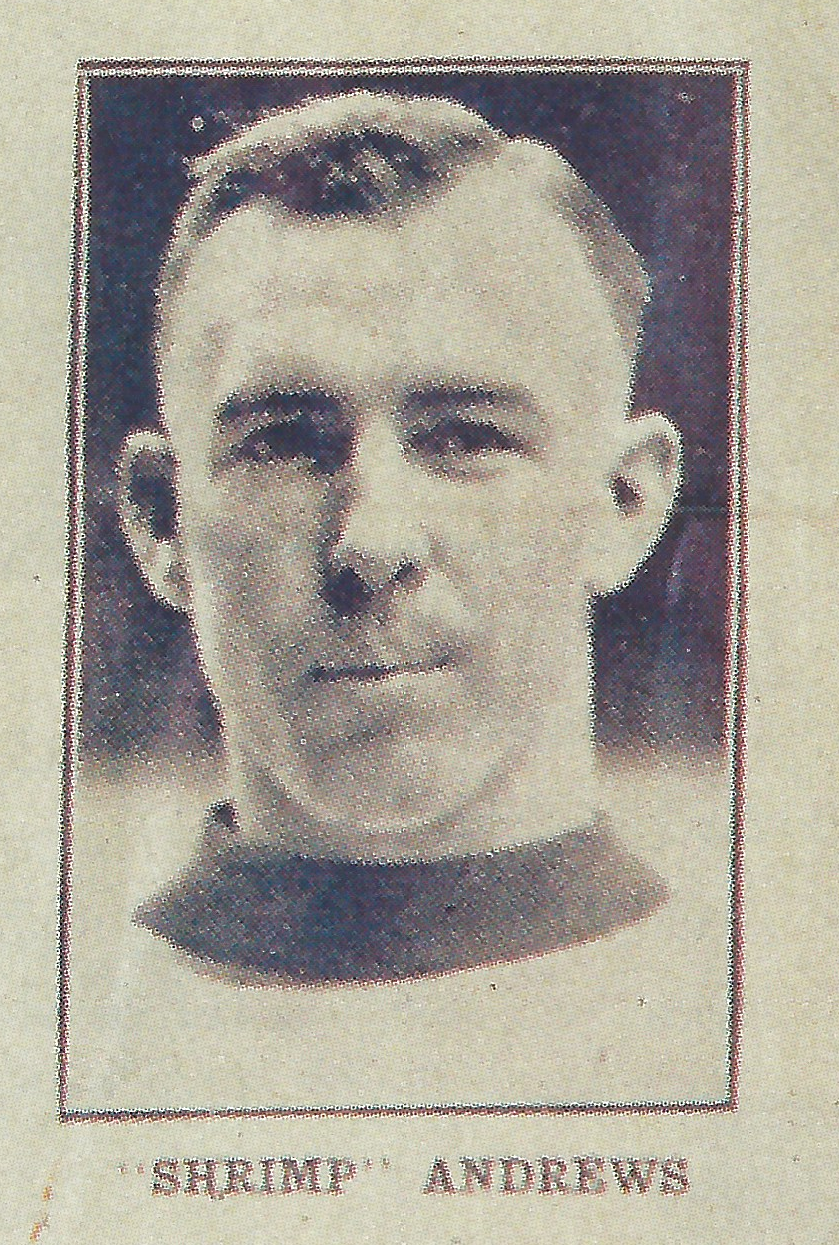
- Born: November 4, 1894 Tillsonburg, Ontario, Canada
- Died: November 17, 1974 (aged 80) Detroit, Michigan, U.S.
- Height: 5 ft 4 in (163 cm)
- Weight: 140 lb (64 kg; 10 st 0 lb)
- Position: Left wing
- Shot: Left
- Played for: Toronto St. Pats
- Playing career: 1914–1934

Lloyd Bailey Thomas "Shrimp" Andrews (November 4, 1894 – November 17, 1974) was a Canadian ice hockey left winger who played four seasons in National Hockey League for the Toronto St. Pats between 1921 and 1925. The rest of his career, which lasted from 1914 to 1934, was spent playing in senior and minor leagues.

== Playing career ==
Andrews was born in Tillsonburg, Ontario. He played four seasons in the National Hockey League for the Toronto St. Pats from 1921–22 to 1924–25. During those four seasons, he played 53 games, scoring 8 goals and adding 5 assists for 13 points. He also had 10 penalty minutes.

Andrews' career was stopped before he could get going as he enlisted in World War I while still a teenager. He returned to play senior hockey for three years at which point the St. Pats signed him on January 23, 1922.

Almost immediately he helped his NHL team win the Stanley Cup. He scored the game-winning goal in the St. Pats 6–0 win over the Vancouver Millionaires in game four of the best-of-five 1922 Stanley Cup finals in what was to be his only trip to the playoffs.

After playing four seasons with the St. Pats, Andrews joined the Can-Am league for six years where he proved to be a scorer of some note, netting as many as 24 goals in the 1929–30 season. He then joined the CHL before retiring in 1934.

== Career statistics ==
=== Regular season and playoffs ===
| | | | Regular season | | | | | Playoffs |
| Season | Team | League | GP | G | A | Pts | PIM | GP | G | A | Pts | PIM |
|---|---|---|---|---|---|---|---|---|---|---|---|---|
| 1914–15 | Dunnville Mudcats | OHA Int | — | — | — | — | — | — | — | — | — | — |
| 1915–16 | Dunnville Mudcats | OHA Int | — | — | — | — | — | — | — | — | — | — |
| 1916–17 | Dunnville Mudcats | OHA Int | — | — | — | — | — | — | — | — | — | — |
| 1918–19 | Niagara Falls Cataracts | OHA Sr | — | — | — | — | — | — | — | — | — | — |
| 1919–20 | Niagara Falls Cataracts | OHA Sr | — | — | — | — | — | — | — | — | — | — |
| 1920–21 | Niagara Falls Cataracts | OHA Sr | — | — | — | — | — | — | — | — | — | — |
| 1921–22 | Toronto St. Patricks | NHL | 11 | 0 | 0 | 0 | 0 | 2 | 0 | 0 | 0 | 0 |
| 1921–22 | Toronto St. Patricks | St-Cup | — | — | — | — | — | 5 | 2 | 0 | 2 | 3 |
| 1922–23 | Toronto St. Patricks | NHL | 23 | 5 | 4 | 9 | 10 | — | — | — | — | — |
| 1923–24 | Toronto St. Patricks | NHL | 12 | 2 | 1 | 3 | 0 | — | — | — | — | — |
| 1924–25 | Toronto St. Patricks | NHL | 7 | 1 | 0 | 1 | 0 | — | — | — | — | — |
| 1926–27 | New Haven Eagles | Can-Am | 32 | 15 | 11 | 26 | 11 | 4 | 1 | 0 | 1 | 4 |
| 1927–28 | New Haven Eagles | Can-Am | 39 | 15 | 9 | 24 | 25 | — | — | — | — | — |
| 1928–29 | Philadelphia Arrows | Can-Am | 39 | 10 | 4 | 14 | 12 | — | — | — | — | — |
| 1929–30 | Philadelphia Arrows | Can-Am | 40 | 24 | 19 | 43 | 30 | 2 | 1 | 0 | 1 | 2 |
| 1930–31 | Philadelphia Arrows | Can-Am | 40 | 15 | 14 | 29 | 24 | — | — | — | — | — |
| 1931–32 | Philadelphia Arrows | Can-Am | 39 | 8 | 15 | 23 | 16 | — | — | — | — | — |
| 1932–33 | St. Paul Greyhounds | AHA | 12 | 1 | 4 | 5 | 2 | — | — | — | — | — |
| 1932–33 | Hibbing Maroons | CHL | 34 | 13 | 16 | 29 | 10 | — | — | — | — | — |
| 1933–34 | Hibbing Miners | CHL | 43 | 18 | 16 | 34 | 28 | 6 | 3 | 1 | 4 | 0 |
| Can-Am totals | | | 229 | 87 | 72 | 159 | 118 | 6 | 2 | 0 | 2 | 6 |
| NHL totals | | | 53 | 8 | 5 | 13 | 10 | 2 | 0 | 0 | 0 | 0 |
