= Duluth Natives =

- City: Duluth, Minnesota
- League: Central Hockey League
- Operated: 1932–1933
- Home arena: Duluth Amphitheater

The Duluth Natives were a short-lived semi-professional ice hockey team in Duluth, Minnesota. They were a member of the Central Hockey League for one season but suspended play after only nine games.

== History ==
After the Virginia Rockets ceased operations in 1932, the Duluth Natives were created in order to keep the league a 5-team circuit. Additionally, the league shifted from a purely amateur organization to a semi-professional one as a way to prevent the same situation from recurring. Duluth opened its inaugural season playing out of the Duluth Amphitheater, however, that presented a problem. The venue was already home to the Duluth Hornets and the competition between the two harmed both clubs. While the Hornets were forced to move elsewhere in the middle of the season, the Natives were only able to play 9 games before being forced to withdraw from the league.

== Year-by-year results ==
Season	W	L	T	Pts	Finish	Postseason
1932–33	9	1	8	0	withdrew	—
