= Bert Burry =

Canadian ice hockey player

- Born: February 7, 1906; Toronto, Ontario, Canada
- Died: July 13, 1999 (aged 93); Vancouver Island, British Columbia, Canada
- Height: 6 ft 0 in (183 cm)
- Weight: 195 lb (88 kg; 13 st 13 lb)
- Position: Defence
- Shot: Left
- Played for: Ottawa Senators
- Playing career: 1931–1933

Herbert Hadley Burry (February 7, 1906 – July 13, 1999) was a Canadian professional ice hockey player who played four games in the National Hockey League with the Ottawa Senators during the 1932–33 season. Born in Toronto, Ontario, he married Louise Mildred Taylor in 1927. After he retired from hockey, Burry was an avid pilot and the owner of McMurray Air Service, with headquarters in Uranium City, Saskatchewan.

He later worked for the Canadian government with its Polar Continental Shelf project as director of the Polar Shelf air supply program. In May 1961, Burry, and a team of scientists were missing for two days when their Otter aircraft, bound for an Arctic research project, crashed after relaying a distress signal. The men were located later by a civilian aircraft near Ellef Ringnes Island. In March 1962, Burry's aircraft again, this time a Beechcraft, went missing on a flight from Cambridge Bay, Northwest Territories to Uranium City, piloted by Captain Ken Moore. He reported that they were forced to make an emergency landing after running out of fuel during the flight, which was also complicated by a snowstorm. The Royal Canadian Air Force and Royal Canadian Mounted Police participated in search efforts. In 1965, Burry was still in the airline industry, this time serving as vice president of NorCanAir.

In 1994, Burry was residing in Sidney, British Columbia.

== Career statistics ==
=== Regular season and playoffs ===
			Regular season					Playoffs
Season	Team	League	GP	G	A	Pts	PIM	GP	G	A	Pts	PIM
1927–28	Toronto Marlboros	OHA	2	0	0	0	—	—	—	—	—	—
1931–32	Springfield Indians	Can-Am	19	0	1	1	20	—	—	—	—	—
1932–33	Ottawa Senators	NHL	4	0	0	0	0	—	—	—	—	—
1932–33	Hibbing Maroons	CHL	7	0	0	0	6	—	—	—	—	—
1936–37	Ottawa Senators	OCHL	8	0	0	0	2	—	—	—	—	—
NHL totals			4	0	0	0	0	—	—	—	—	—
