= Vic Desjardins =

American ice hockey player (1898–1988)

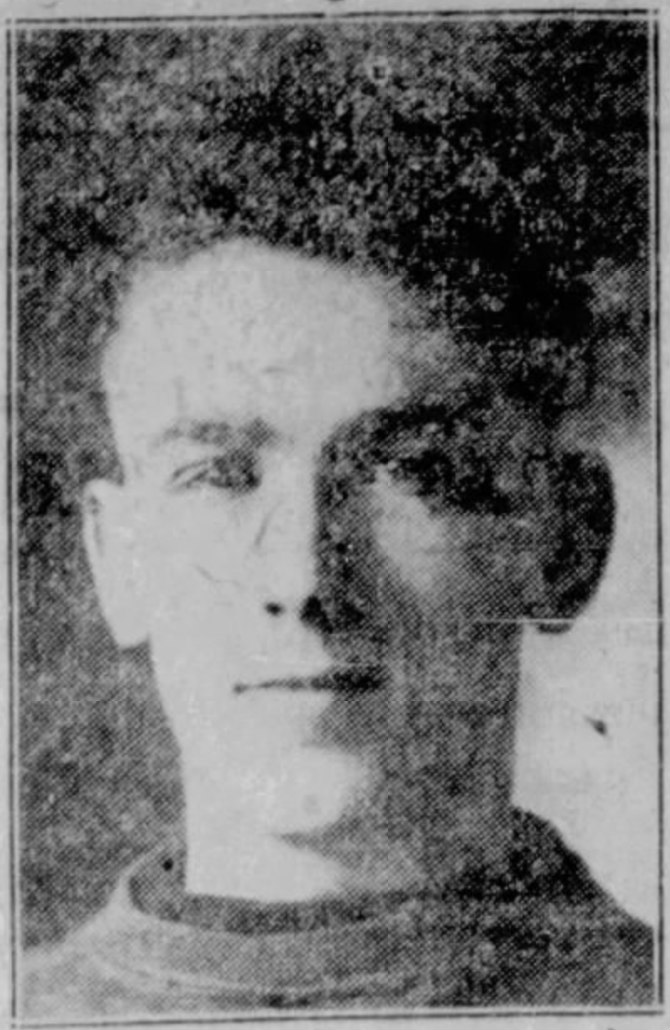
- Born: July 4, 1898 Sault Ste. Marie, Michigan, U.S.
- Died: November 22, 1988 (aged 90) Sault Ste. Marie, Michigan, U.S.
- Height: 5 ft 9 in (175 cm)
- Weight: 160 lb (73 kg; 11 st 6 lb)
- Position: Center
- Shot: Right
- Played for: Chicago Black Hawks; New York Rangers
- Playing career: 1919–1938

Victor Arthur Desjardins (July 4, 1898 – November 22, 1988) was an American ice hockey player. He played 87 games in the National Hockey League with the Chicago Black Hawks and New York Rangers during the 1930–31 and 1931–32 seasons. The rest of his career, which lasted from 1919 to 1938, was spent in various minor leagues. He was inducted into the United States Hockey Hall of Fame in 1974. He was born in Sault Ste. Marie, Michigan and was the nephew of Hockey Hall of Fame inductee Didier Pitre.

== Career statistics ==
=== Regular season and playoffs ===
			Regular season					Playoffs
Season	Team	League	GP	G	A	Pts	PIM	GP	G	A	Pts	PIM
1918–19	Sault Ste. Marie Nationals	NOSHA	—	—	—	—	—	—	—	—	—	—
1919–20	Michigan Soo Indians	USAHA	14	12	4	16	—	—	—	—	—	—
1920–21	Soo Greyhounds	NMHL	13	11	4	15	—	—	—	—	—	—
1920–21	Soo Greyhounds	NOHA	9	11	4	15	4	5	1	1	2	—
1921–22	Eveleth Rangers	USAHA	—	—	—	—	—	—	—	—	—	—
1922–23	Eveleth Rangers	USAHA	20	8	0	8	—	—	—	—	—	—
1923–24	Eveleth Rangers	USAHA	20	5	0	5	—	—	—	—	—	—
1924–25	Eveleth Arrowheads	USAHA	40	14	0	14	—	4	2	0	2	—
1925–26	Eveleth Rangers	CHL	38	18	4	22	40	—	—	—	—	—
1926–27	St. Paul Saints	AHA	34	13	4	17	30	—	—	—	—	—
1927–28	St. Paul Saints	AHA	40	20	8	28	46	—	—	—	—	—
1928–29	St. Paul Saints	AHA	39	16	10	26	48	8	4	1	5	6
1929–30	St. Paul Saints	AHA	45	25	10	35	47	—	—	—	—	—
1930–31	Chicago Black Hawks	NHL	39	3	12	15	17	9	0	0	0	0
1931–32	New York Rangers	NHL	48	3	3	6	16	7	0	0	0	0
1932–33	St. Paul Saints	CHL	31	16	12	28	10	4	4	0	4	6
1932–33	Springfield Indians	Can-Am	13	5	9	14	4	—	—	—	—	—
1933–34	Tulsa Oilers	AHA	46	21	13	34	37	4	1	2	3	4
1934–35	Tulsa Oilers	AHA	46	16	18	34	37	5	2	5	7	4
1935–36	Tulsa Oilers	AHA	45	20	21	41	27	3	0	0	0	0
1936–37	Kansas City Greyhounds	AHA	48	13	16	29	37	3	1	0	1	0
1937–38	Kansas City Greyhounds	AHA	36	6	7	13	2	—	—	—	—	—
AHA totals			379	150	107	257	311	23	8	8	16	14
NHL totals			87	6	15	21	33	16	0	0	0	0
