= Milton Brink =

American ice hockey player

- Born: November 26, 1910 Hibbing, Minnesota, U.S.
- Died: October 31, 1999 (aged 88)
- Height: 5 ft 10 in (178 cm)
- Weight: 165 lb (75 kg; 11 st 11 lb)
- Position: Center
- Shot: Left
- Played for: Chicago Black Hawks
- Playing career: 1931–1940

Milton Kenneth "Milt, Curly" Brink (November 26, 1910 – October 31, 1999) was an American professional ice hockey center who played five games in the National Hockey League with the Chicago Black Hawks during the 1936–37 season. Brink spent most of his career, which lasted from 1931 to 1940, in the American Hockey Association. He was inducted into the United States Hockey Hall of Fame in 1999.

== Career statistics ==
=== Regular season and playoffs ===
			Regular season					Playoffs
Season	Team	League	GP	G	A	Pts	PIM	GP	G	A	Pts	PIM
1926–27	Eveleth-Gilbert High School	HS-MN	—	—	—	—	—	—	—	—	—	—
1927–28	Eveleth-Gilbert High School	HS-MN	—	—	—	—	—	—	—	—	—	—
1928–29	Eveleth-Gilbert High School	HS-MN	—	—	—	—	—	—	—	—	—	—
1929–30	Eveleth-Gilbert High School	HS-MN	—	—	—	—	—	—	—	—	—	—
1931–32	Boston Cubs	Can-Am	4	1	0	1	0	1	0	0	0	0
1932–33	Eveleth Rangers	CHL	38	9	14	23	6	3	0	1	1	7
1933–34	Eveleth Rangers	CHL	41	17	17	34	10	3	2	1	3	2
1934–35	Eveleth Rangers	CHL	35	12	18	30	10	—	—	—	—	—
1935–36	Kansas City Greyhounds	AHA	45	9	20	29	4	—	—	—	—	—
1936–37	Chicago Black Hawks	NHL	5	0	0	0	0	—	—	—	—	—
1936–37	Kansas City Greyhounds	AHA	2	0	1	1	0	—	—	—	—	—
1936–37	Minneapolis Millers	AHA	11	0	2	2	4	—	—	—	—	—
1937–38	St. Paul Saints	AHA	48	8	26	34	6	—	—	—	—	—
1938–39	Wichita Skyhawks	AHA	5	0	1	1	0	—	—	—	—	—
1939–40	Portage Lake Elks	NMHL	24	19	11	30	—	—	—	—	—	—
AHA totals			111	17	50	67	14	—	—	—	—	—
CHL totals			114	38	49	87	26	6	2	2	4	9
NHL totals			5	0	0	0	0	—	—	—	—	—
