= William McGonagle (disambiguation) =

William McGonagle (1925–1999) was a United States Navy officer.

William McGonagle may also refer to:

- William A. McGonacle (fireboat), a fireboat in Duluth, Minnesota
- SS William A McGonagle, a 1916 lake freighter; see 600-footers
- William McGonagle (footballer) (1905–1956), Scottish footballer
