= Chaisson =

Chaisson is a surname. Notable people with the surname include:

- Eric Chaisson (born 1946), American astronomer, educator and writer
- Greg Chaisson, American bass guitarist
- Joel Chaisson (born 1960), American politician
- K'Lavon Chaisson (born 1999), American football player
- Ray Chaisson (born 1918), American ice hockey player
- Tim Chaisson (born 1986), Canadian singer-songwriter
