= Duluth Curling and Skating Club =

Indoor, artificial ice rink

- Interactive map of Duluth Curling and Skating Club
- Location: 1330 London Road; Duluth, Minnesota, 55805
- Coordinates: 46°47′55″N 92°04′50″W
- Owner: Curling Club of Duluth
- Operator: Curling Club of Duluth
- Capacity: 2,000 (ice hockey)
- Surface: 12 curling, 1 ice hockey natural (1912–1953) artificial (1953–1976)

Construction
- Groundbreaking: 1910
- Opened: 1913
- Closed: 1976
- Demolished: 1985
- Cost: $90,000 (plus $33,000 for the land)

Tenants
- Duluth Hornets (1914–1924); Minnesota Duluth Bulldogs men's ice hockey (1946–1966)

The Duluth Curling and Skating Club in Duluth, Minnesota was an indoor venue, with several surfaces for athletic pursuits. The building was the home of the Duluth Curling Club for over 60 years and also served as the primary ice hockey rink in the region after the demolition of the Duluth Amphitheater.

== History ==
In 1910 the Duluth Curling Club purchased a 5-acre plot of land on the east side of London Road between 13th- and 14th-avenue. A little over two years later, construction on the Duluth Curling and Skating Club was finished and the building opened in December 1912. The ground floor housed twelve curling sheets, the largest collection in the United States for many years. An ice hockey rink was situated on the second floor with enough seating for about 2,000 people. While curling matches began immediately, the first ice hockey game took place on 17 January 1913. The first primary tenant of the rink was the Duluth Hornets, who used the facility for their first 10 years of existence. The arena also hosted many local amateur and high school teams during the early years.

In 1924, the Duluth Amphitheater was completed and most major ice hockey games were moved to the new building. Aside from having double the capacity, the Amphitheater sported artificial ice and was able to provide more consistent conditions year-round. The ice rink remained in use at the Curling Club afterwards but only when the Amphitheater was occupied. In February 1939, the Amphitheater's roof collapsed and forced all of the local hockey team back into the Curling Club. When it became clear that the Amphitheater could not be repaired, the Curling Club became the hub of ice hockey in the city once more.

After World War II, Duluth State Teachers College restarted its ice hockey program and used the Curling and Skating Club as its home venue. The uptick in use caused the Curling Club to eventually install an artificial ice plant for all of the surfaces. While the primary beneficiary was the hockey rink, the curling sheets saw much improvement as well. In 1966, the Duluth Arena Auditorium was completed and all ice hockey competitions were moved out of the Curling and Skating Club. Curling remained at the venue for another decade but by the mid-70s the building was beginning to show its age. The Curling Club of Duluth moved all of their events to the Duluth Arena Auditorium with the Curling and Skating Club closing in 1976.

Though it was closed, the large building still dominated the skyline next to Lake Superior. After falling victim to vandalism and being used as housing for transients and homeless, a local movement was undertaken in the early 1980s to turn the site into landmark or museum. Unfortunately, efforts to save the venue were rendered moot when a fire gutted the Curling and Skating Club. According to the Duluth Fire Department, the fire was set at approximately 2:00 am on 3 June 1984 and caused a great deal of damage to the internal structure. While the exterior was still in place, the cost of refurbishing the old building was prohibitive. Further putting the area in jeopardy was the extension of I-35, which was looking to stretch along the shoreline up to 26th avenue. Eventually, the Minnesota Department of Transportation bought the site for $461,000 and the demolition of the building began on 1 January 1985. The eastern side of the land that used to house the Curling and Skating Club now contains the I-35 tunnel that connects northern and southern Duluth. The western section of the land was converted into a parking lot for Leif Erikson Park and the Duluth Rose Garden.
