= Duluth Hornets (CHL) =

- City: Duluth, Minnesota
- League: Central Hockey League
- Operated: 1933–1934
- Home arena: Duluth Amphitheater

The Duluth Hornets were a short-lived semi-professional ice hockey team in Duluth, Minnesota. They were a member of the Central Hockey League for one season.

== History ==
The Hornets arose during an unstable period for ice hockey in Minnesota. In the middle of the Great Depression, most teams were unable to pay their players or even get much revenue from the fans. The dire circumstances caused two separate teams to leave Duluth the previous season, leaving the Duluth Amphitheater searching for a tenant. The Hornets were put together, taking the same name as one of the departed clubs, and joined the Central Hockey League. The roster was a motley crew of players, many of whom had not played organized hockey in over a year, or at all. The results, predictably, were a last-place finish in the league. While the Hornets did well to play an entire season, the financial situation had not improved enough to allow the team to return for a second season.

== Year-by-year results ==
Season	W	L	T	Pts	Finish	Postseason
1933–34	44	12	27	5	5th	—

== Notable players ==
- Rudy Ahlin
- Fern Headley
- Johnny Mitchell
