= Virgil Johnson =

Virgil Johnson may refer to:

- Virgil Johnson (ice hockey) (1909–1993), American ice hockey player
- Virgil Johnson (singer) (1935–2013), African American deejay and singer
