= Fireboats of Duluth =

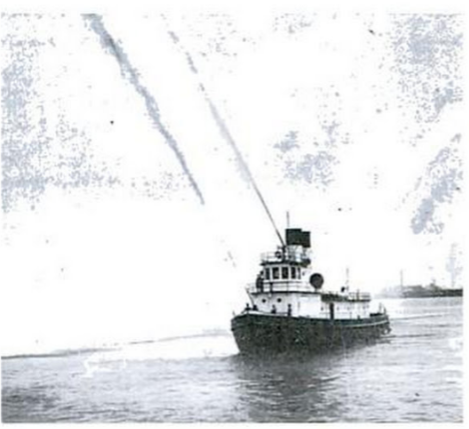
The William A. McGonagle could pump 12,000 gallons per minute.

During the early 20th century, large and powerful fireboats were operated in Duluth, Minnesota. In 1920 both the Duluth, Mesaba & Northern Railway Company and the Duluth & Iron Range Railway Company operated fireboats in Duluth, the William A. McGonacle and the Halle.

In 2016 it was reported that the Duluth and Superior Fire Department would be receiving a modern powerful fireboat through a FEMA Port Security Grant. In recent years firefighters had been reduced to fighting fires using only an inflatable boat.

The Marine 19, a 32 feet (9.8 m) fireboat, manufactured by Lake Assault Boats, was delivered on May 8, 2019. She was built with the assistance of a FEMA port security grant.
