= Houston Huskies =

Minor league ice hockey team in Houston, Texas

The Houston Huskies were a minor league ice hockey team based in Houston, Texas. Formerly known as the Houston Skippers, they were a member of the United States Hockey League, and were active from 1947 to 1949. They were affiliated with the Buffalo Bisons.

The Huskies continued with the same team as the Skippers, and also continued playing in Sam Houston Coliseum. In 1948 former Montreal Canadiens player Toe Blake was named head coach. The Huskies went on to have a great season, eventually winning the 1948 USHL championship.

In June 1949 the Huskies were dropped from the USHL. The Huskies, along with teams from Dallas and Fort Worth attempted to form a Texas Hockey League, but were unable to get firm commitments for dates. Because of this, the Sam Houston Coliseum canceled their contract with the team. Without a place to play, and no other city willing to host them, the Huskies were forced to cancel their 1949–50 season. The team ceased operations in late 1949.

Bob Blake played one season with the Huskies and led the team to a championship trophy. He was inducted into the United States Hockey Hall of Fame in 1985.
