= 1927–28 AHA season =

- League: American Hockey Association
- Sport: Ice hockey
- Number of games: 40
- Number of teams: 5

Regular season
- Season champions: Duluth Hornets
- Top scorer: Vic Desjardins (St. Paul)

Postseason
- Champions: Minneapolis Millers
- Runners-up: Duluth Hornets

Seasons
- ← 1926–27 1928–29 →

The 1927–28 AHA season was the second season for the American Hockey Association.

== Schedule and playoffs ==
All five teams played their conference opponents 10 times each.

=== Chicago Americans ===
After previous the season, the league voted to rescind Eddie Livingstone's ownership of the Chicago Americans. The franchise was then moved to Kansas City and renamed Pla-Mors, after their new home venue.

== Regular season ==
	GP	W	L	T	Pts	GF	GA
Duluth Hornets	40	18	9	13	49	63	49
Kansas City Pla-Mors	40	18	14	8	44	61	53
Minneapolis Millers	40	18	17	5	41	65	51
St. Paul Saints	40	14	17	9	37	76	87
Winnipeg Maroons	40	11	22	7	28	68	93

== Scoring leaders ==
Note: GP = Games played; G = Goals; A = Assists; Pts = Points; PIM = Penalty minutes

Player	Team	GP	G	A	Pts	PIM
Vic Desjardins	St. Paul Saints	40	20	8	28	46
Cooney Weiland	Minneapolis Millers	40	21	5	26	34
Moose Goheen	St. Paul Saints	39	19	5	24	96
Rosario Couture	Winnipeg Maroons	39	15	6	21	20
Herbie Lewis	Duluth Hornets	40	14	5	19	56
Johnny Gottselig	Winnipeg Maroons	39	14	5	19	24
Frank Sheppard	St. Paul Saints	33	12	4	16	32
Ken Dunfield	Kansas City Pla-Mors	39	8	7	15	24
Helge Bostrom	Minneapolis Millers	36	10	3	13	39
Art Somers	Winnipeg Maroons	40	8	5	13	71

== Playoff ==
Semifinals; March 24–28								Championship; April 2–9
								1	Duluth Hornets	0	0	0	0	1	1
2	Kansas City Pla-Mors	1	1	0	-	-	-	3	Minneapolis Millers	0	0	0	1	1	2
3	Minneapolis Millers	2	2	1	-	-	-

Note: the semifinal was a best-of-five series while the final was a five-game total-goal series.
