= Rosario Couture =

Canadian ice hockey player

- Rosario "Lolo" Couture
- Born: July 24, 1905 Saint Boniface, Manitoba, Canada
- Died: March 1, 1986 (aged 80) Winnipeg, Manitoba, Canada
- Height: 5 ft 11 in (180 cm)
- Weight: 163 lb (74 kg; 11 st 9 lb)
- Position: Right wing
- Shot: Right
- Played for: Chicago Black Hawks; Montreal Canadiens
- Playing career: 1927–1936

Joseph Albert Rosario "Lolo" Couture (July 24, 1905 – March 1, 1986) was a Canadian ice hockey player. Couture was a right winger who played for the Chicago Black Hawks and the Montreal Canadiens from 1928 to 1935. He won the Stanley Cup with Chicago in 1934.

== Life and career ==
Born in St. Boniface, Manitoba, Couture began his NHL career in 1928 with the Chicago Black Hawks. He would play for them until the end of the 1934–35 season. He helped the Black Hawks win the Stanley Cup in 1934.

After brief stops in the minor leagues with the London Tecumsehs of the International Hockey League and the Providence Reds of the Can-Am League. He played the 1935–36 season with the Montreal Canadiens.

He and fellow Black Hawk Leroy Goldsworthy identified the body of teammate Jack Leswick, who died in mysterious circumstances. Couture died in Winnipeg, Manitoba in 1986 and is buried in St. Boniface Cathedral.

== Career statistics ==
=== Regular season and playoffs ===
			Regular season					Playoffs
Season	Team	League	GP	G	A	Pts	PIM	GP	G	A	Pts	PIM
1922–23	St. Boniface Canadiens	WDJHL	7	6	2	8	4	—	—	—	—	—
1923–24	Winnipeg Argonauts	MHL	—	—	—	—	—	—	—	—	—	—
1924–25	Winnipeg Argonauts	MHL	8	7	2	9	6	—	—	—	—	—
1925–26	Winnipeg Argonauts	MHL	7	9	3	12	4	2	3	0	3	2
1926–27	Winnipegs	MHL	8	16	1	17	6	5	4	1	5	2
1926–27	Winnipegs	Al-Cup	—	—	—	—	—	2	2	0	2	0
1927–28	Winnipeg Maroons	AHA	39	14	6	20	20	—	—	—	—	—
1928–29	Chicago Black Hawks	NHL	43	1	3	4	24	—	—	—	—	—
1929–30	Chicago Black Hawks	NHL	43	8	8	16	67	2	0	0	0	2
1930–31	Chicago Black Hawks	NHL	44	8	11	19	29	9	0	3	3	2
1931–32	Chicago Black Hawks	NHL	48	9	9	18	8	2	0	0	0	2
1932–33	Chicago Black Hawks	NHL	46	10	7	17	26	—	—	—	—	—
1933–34	Chicago Black Hawks	NHL	48	5	8	13	21	8	1	2	3	4
1934–35	Chicago Black Hawks	NHL	47	7	8	15	10	2	0	0	0	5
1935–36	Montreal Canadiens	NHL	10	0	1	1	0	—	—	—	—	—
1935–36	London Tecumsehs	IHL	26	5	3	8	8	—	—	—	—	—
1935–36	Providence Reds	Can-Am	8	1	0	1	0	4	0	0	0	4
NHL totals			329	48	55	103	185	23	1	5	6	15

== Awards and achievements ==
- Stanley Cup Championships (1934)
- Honoured Member of the Manitoba Hockey Hall of Fame
