= Bob Blake (ice hockey) =

American ice hockey player (1914–2008)

- Born: August 16, 1914 Ashland, Wisconsin, U.S.
- Died: November 26, 2008 (aged 94) Cheektowaga, New York, U.S.
- Height: 6 ft 0 in (183 cm)
- Weight: 200 lb (91 kg; 14 st 4 lb)
- Position: Left wing
- Shot: Left
- Played for: Boston Bruins
- Playing career: 1934–1943; 1945–1951

Louis Robert Blake (August 16, 1914 – November 26, 2008) was an American ice hockey player who played with the Boston Bruins in the 1935–1936 National Hockey League season. After three years of hockey in high school, Blake began his professional career at the age of 17 in the Central Hockey League. Within two years he was one of the Canadian-American Hockey League's top scorers and was given an opportunity to play with the Bruins in 1935.

His tenure with the Bruins would be his only season in the National Hockey League, and Blake returned to playing in smaller leagues, eventually settling with the American Hockey League's Buffalo Bisons. Blake spent seven seasons with the team, including a term as captain and a break during World War II, where he fought in the Pacific Theater. He played on minor teams for two more years after the Bisons, retiring in 1951 as a member of the Cincinnati Mohawks. He later coached high school hockey and was inducted into the United States Hockey Hall of Fame in 1985. Blake died at the age of 94 in 2008.

== Early life ==
Blake was born in Ashland, Wisconsin, on August 16, 1914, and raised in Hibbing, Minnesota. He played high school hockey for three years in Hibbing, Minnesota, for the Hibbing Blue Jackets. At the peak of his career, Blake stood six feet tall and weighed 200 pounds.

== Hockey career ==
Blake, a left winger, began his career at the age of 17. He was a member of the Hibbing Miners' squad in the Central Hockey League during the 1933–1934 season, scoring 12 goals and 10 assists during the regular season and 3 goals and 1 assist during the playoffs. He then signed with the Boston Cubs of the Canadian-American Hockey League, helping lead them to the championships for the 1934–1935 season with 5 goals and 7 assists.

During his second season with the Cubs, after becoming one of the league's top ten scorers, Blake was drafted by the National Hockey League for the 1935–36 NHL season, debuting with the Boston Bruins. He played 12 games, alongside eight future Hockey Hall of Fame members, including Eddie Shore and Tiny Thompson. Despite 7 goals and 10 assists with the Cubs, he remained scoreless with the Bruins and was released from the team at the end of the season. He spent two seasons with the Minneapolis Millers of the American Hockey Association, garnering a total of 34 goals and 61 assists during this period.

Blake signed up with the International-American Hockey League under the Cleveland Barons, bringing them to victory during the playoffs of the 1938–1939 season with a total of 9 goals and 13 assists. After a brief stint with the Pittsburgh Hornets, he played the remained of the 1939–1940 season with the Barons, amassing a record of 8 goals and 8 assists. Blake returned to the Minneapolis Millers for the 1940–1941 season, collecting an additional 4 goals and 9 assists.

Midway through the season, Blake joined the Buffalo Bisons of the American Hockey League, necessitating a move to New York. He spent seven seasons with the Bisons as a defenseman from 1940 to 1949, with a two-season break from 1943 to 1945 due to World War II. For the 1941–1942 season, he was voted as Buffalo's most popular player and was named team captain for that season and the next, when the Bisons won the Calder Cup. During his tenure with the team, he amassed a total of 26 goals and 61 assists.

Concurrent with his tenure with the Bisons, Blake played with the Houston Huskies, a Bisons' affiliate in the United States Hockey League for the 1947–1948 season. There, he was credited with helping the team win the Loudan Trophy, with a total of 14 goals and 22 assists. In his sole season with the USHL, he was often rated as the best defenseman in the league. Blake spent the 1949–1950 season with the Cincinnati Mohawks of the American Hockey League, scoring 4 goals with 15 assists. After playing for the New Haven Eagles, Buffalo Bisons, and the Cincinnati Mohawks from 1950 to 1951, Blake retired from professional hockey, with a total of 7 goals and 11 assists in his final season.

== Later life ==
Blake fought in World War II in the Pacific Theater. He served with the United States Army Air Forces from 1943 through the end of the conflict. After his retirement, he coached high school hockey and for a team in Fort Erie, Ontario. He was inducted into the United States Hockey Hall of Fame in 1985 and continued to teach the younger generations of his family how to play hockey into his 90s. He had a daughter, Judith, and two sons, Robert and Thomas, with his wife Bernadine McNerney, who died in 2006. Blake died November 26, 2008, in Cheektowaga, New York at the age of 94. He was buried in West Seneca, New York, on December 1, 2008.

== Career statistics ==
=== Regular season and playoffs ===
			Regular season					Playoffs
Season	Team	League	GP	G	A	Pts	PIM	GP	G	A	Pts	PIM
1932–33	Hibbing/Chisholm High School	HS-MN	—	—	—	—	—	—	—	—	—	—
1933–34	Hibbing Miners	CHL	42	10	12	22	74	6	3	1	4	8
1934–35	Boston Tiger Cubs	Can-Am	44	5	7	12	28	3	0	0	0	4
1935–36	Boston Bruins	NHL	12	0	0	0	0	—	—	—	—	—
1935–36	Boston Cubs	Can-Am	37	7	10	17	38	—	—	—	—	—
1936–37	Minneapolis Millers	AHA	48	13	24	37	13	6	2	7	9	0
1937–38	Minneapolis Millers	AHA	48	17	26	43	40	7	2	4	6	0
1938–39	Cleveland Barons	IAHL	53	9	11	20	14	9	0	2	2	2
1939–40	Pittsburgh Hornets	IAHL	3	1	1	2	4	—	—	—	—	—
1939–40	Cleveland Barons	IAHL	46	8	8	16	8	—	—	—	—	—
1940–41	Minneapolis Millers	AHA	19	4	9	13	8	—	—	—	—	—
1940–41	Buffalo Bisons	AHL	33	1	6	7	20	—	—	—	—	—
1941–42	Buffalo Bisons	AHL	56	6	15	21	58	—	—	—	—	—
1942–43	Buffalo Bisons	AHL	42	3	14	17	28	9	1	3	4	2
1945–46	Buffalo Bisons	AHL	10	1	2	3	2	12	0	4	4	0
1946–47	Buffalo Bisons	AHL	63	6	11	17	57	4	0	2	2	0
1947–48	Buffalo Bisons	AHL	5	0	0	0	0	—	—	—	—	—
1947–48	Houston Huskies	USHL	49	12	20	32	29	12	2	2	4	10
1948–49	Buffalo Bisons	AHL	63	8	10	18	32	—	—	—	—	—
1949–50	Cincinnati Mohawks	AHL	49	4	15	19	33	—	—	—	—	—
1950–51	New Haven Eagles	AHL	27	3	6	9	16	—	—	—	—	—
1950–51	Buffalo Bisons	AHL	24	4	5	9	6	—	—	—	—	—
1950–51	Cincinnati Mohawks	AHL	2	0	0	0	0	—	—	—	—	—
IAHL/AHL totals			374	36	84	120	252	25	1	9	10	2
NHL totals			12	0	0	0	0	—	—	—	—	—
