= Virginia Rockets =

- City: Virginia, Minnesota
- League: Central Hockey League
- Operated: 1931–1932
- Home arena: Virginia Recreation Building

The Virginia Rockets were a short-lived amateur ice hockey team in Virginia, Minnesota. They were a member of the Central Hockey League for one season and finished last in the standings.

== History ==
When the Central Hockey League was created in 1931, the three extant teams that had formed the league sought to add a few more members to aid the viability of the circuit. Virginia and Hibbing were soon added to bring the league's roster up to five. Unfortunately for Virginia, the Rockets were the worst team of the bunch. The club won just 5 of its 32 games and finished with the lowest attendance, averaging just 320 fans per game. Rather than continue on, the team was disbanded after the season. While most of the players never played organized hockey again, Joe Papike would continue his career for several seasons and even played 20 games for the Chicago Blackhawks during World War II.

== Year-by-year results ==
Season	W	L	T	Pts	Finish	Postseason
1931–32	32	5	26	1	5th	—
