= Marine 19 (Duluth fireboat) =

Marine 19 is a 32 feet (9.8 m) fireboat operated by the Duluth Fire Department. She was built by Lake Assault Boats for $597,000, with three quarters of her cost being paid by a FEMA Port Security grant. As is typical of fireboats built with the help of FEMA grants, she is a multirole vessel, capable of deploying measures to deal with toxic spills, or hostile attacks that require first responders to deploy in a vehicle with a sealed air supply. As with other FEMA fireboats she is equipped with modern sensors that work at night, in fog or smoke, features also useful when deployed on search and rescue.

She was delivered on May 8, 2019, and will be commissioned on May 29, 2019. She was scheduled to be delivered in August 2018, but the 2018 hurricane season triggered a shortage of suitable outboard motors. The Fire Department got a $30,000 grant for training her crew during the period from the delivery to commissioning.

Her top speed is 45 miles per hour (72 km/h). She is capable of projecting 2,000 gallons per minute.

== Operational career ==
Marine 19 participated in a joint training exercise conducted with the Superior Fire Department, on September 27, 2019, that had been prompted by a serious fire in a grain elevator in Superior in 2018.
