= Duluth Amphitheater =

Indoor, artificial ice rink

- Interactive map of Duluth Amphitheater
- Location: 1131 E Superior Street; Duluth, Minnesota, 55802
- Coordinates: 46°47′54″N 92°05′01″W
- Owner: City of Duluth
- Capacity: 4,000

Construction
- Opened: December 4, 1924
- Closed: February 12, 1939
- Demolished: 1941 (partial)

Tenants
- Duluth Hornets (1924–1933); Minnesota Duluth Bulldogs men's ice hockey (1930–1932)

The Duluth Amphitheater in Duluth, Minnesota was an indoor, artificial ice rink. The venue was one of the first two artificial rinks in Minnesota (the other being the Minneapolis Arena) and hosted a variety of games in the Duluth area.

== History ==
In order to accommodate the increasingly large crowds that were attending ice hockey games, the Amphitheater was built in downtown Duluth. The building opened on December 4, 1924, and immediately saw capacity crowds for Duluth Hornets games. The venue served as the home for Hornets until 1933 when the franchise moved to Wichita, Kansas. In 1930, Duluth State Teachers College founded an ice hockey program and played two seasons at the Amphitheater before poor performance and the Great Depression forced its suspension. A second Hornets team called the arena home in 1934 but lasted just one season. The building saw no professional ice hockey games after 1934, but still served as the home for local amateur matches.

In February 1939, during a benefit game for the Duluth Fire Department and Police Department, the roof collapsed due to heavy snow. Because the wooden roof had been audibly 'cracking' beforehand, the attendees were able to evacuate before the collapse and no serious injuries were reported. While there was an attempt to fix the roof, eventually the City of Duluth decided to raze the building and it was partially demolished in 1941. The town remained without an artificial rink until 1953 when the Duluth Curling and Skating Club was retrofitted.
