= Ray Chaisson =

American ice hockey player

- Born: Raymond C. Chaisson; June 23, 1918; Cambridge, Massachusetts, U.S.
- Died: June 17, 1983 (aged 64)
- Occupation: Ice hockey player

Raymond C. Chaisson (June 23, 1918 – June 17, 1983) was an ice hockey player. Chaisson played professionally in the Eastern Hockey League and Pacific Coast Hockey League. He was inducted into the United States Hockey Hall of Fame in 1974.

== Career ==
Chaisson attended Boston College in the 1940s where his jersey was retired and he was inducted into the Boston College Hall of Fame.
