= Duluth Fire Department =

Operational area
- Country: United States
- State: Minnesota
- City: Duluth

Agency overview
- Annual budget: $13,254,000 (2010)
- Staffing: 141

Facilities and equipment
- Stations: 8
- Engines: 6
- Trucks: 1
- Quints: 2
- Rescues: 2
- Fireboats: 1

Website
- Official website

The Duluth Fire Department provides fire protection and emergency medical services to the City of Duluth, Minnesota.

The city commissioned an external analysis of the Department in 2012. According to the report the department employed 141 staff members, who at the time staffed 9 fire stations.

In May 2019 the department acquired the fireboat Marine 19, through a FEMA port security grant.

== Stations and apparatus ==
The department operates from 8 stations located throughout the city.

Fire Station	Address	Engine Company	Tower Company/Quint Company	Rescue Unit
1	602 W 2nd St	Engine 1	Tower 1	Rescue 1
2	2627 W Superior St	Engine 2		
4	425 W College St		Quint 4	
6	5031 E Superior St	Engine 6		
7	1419 Maple Grove RD	Engine 7		
8	5830 Grand Ave		Quint 8	
10	1106 Commonwealth Ave	Engine 10		
11	3501 Woodland Ave	Engine 11		
