= Hibbing Maroons =

- City: Hibbing, Minnesota
- League: Central Hockey League
- Operated: 1931–1934
- Home arena: Hibbing Memorial Building

Franchise history
- 1931–1933: Hibbing Maroons
- 1933–1934: Hibbing Miners

The Hibbing Maroons were a semi-professional ice hockey team in Hibbing, Minnesota. They were a member of the Central Hockey League for three seasons and were disbanded in 1934.

== History ==
The Maroons were one of the founding members of the Central Hockey League, starting as an amateur team in 1931 at the height of the Great Depression. After a decent first season, the team changed to semi-professional status, in keeping with the rest of the league, in 1932. Hibbing finished last in their second season and then rebranded as the 'Hibbing Miners' for year three. The club recovered mightily that year, posting their first winning season while averaging just under 3 goals per game. Unfortunately, mid-way through the season the team's home rink was destroyed by a fire. The Miners managed to pay out the remainder of their schedule but, without a home venue, the team folded after the season.

== Year-by-year results ==
Season	W	L	T	Pts	Finish	Postseason
1931–32	36	16	18	2	4th	—
1932–33	40	11	26	3	4th	—
1933–34	44	22	18	4	3rd	—

== Notable players ==
- Lloyd Andrews
- Bob Blake
- Joe Bretto
- Vern Turner
