= 1931–32 CHL season =

American ice hockey season

The 1931–32 CHL season was the first season of the Central Hockey League, a minor professional ice hockey league in the Midwestern United States. Five teams participated in the league, and the Minneapolis Millers won the championship.

== Regular season ==
	GP	W	L	T	GF	GA	Pts
Eveleth Rangers	33	23	10	0	97	70	50
Minneapolis Millers	36	22	11	3	113	67	44
St. Paul Saints	35	16	17	2	84	99	34
Hibbing Maroons	36	16	18	2	81	70	32
Virginia Rockets	32	5	26	1	64	133	10
