= 1934–35 CHL season =

American ice hockey season

The 1934–35 CHL season was the fourth and final season of the Central Hockey League, a minor professional ice hockey league in the Midwestern United States. Three teams participated in the league, and the St. Paul Saints won the championship.

In August 1935, the Minneapolis Millers announced they would not be participating in the CHL during the 1935–36 season, while the St. Paul Saints said they were ready to join the American Hockey Association if more clubs did not join.

== Regular season ==
	GP	W	L	T	GF	GA	Pts
St. Paul Saints	47	28	10	9	137	88	56
Minneapolis Millers	48	21	19	8	108	105	42
Eveleth Rangers	47	9	30	8	88	137	26
