= St. Paul Saints (AHA) =

- City: Saint Paul, Minnesota; USA
- League: AAHA (1915–16); USAHA (1920–1925); CAHL (1925–26); AHA (1926–1930); CHL (1931–1935); AHA (1935–1942)
- Founded: c. 1914
- Home arena: St. Paul Hippodrome (1914–1926)
- Colors: Red, White Red, White, Green

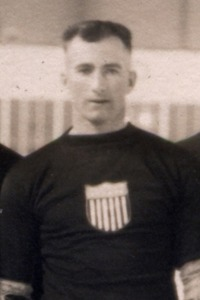
St. Paul Saints star player Moose Goheen with the US national team at the 1920 Olympics.

The St. Paul Saints were an amateur and later professional ice hockey team from Saint Paul, Minnesota that played in various American leagues during the first half of the 20th century, among them the United States Amateur Hockey Association (1920–1925) and the American Hockey Association (1926–1930 and 1935–1942). Originally known as the St. Paul Athletic Club the team started out around the 1914–15 season.

The first time ice hockey made its way to the Olympic Games, for the 1920 Summer Olympics in Antwerp, Belgium, the St. Paul Athletic Club/Saints had four of its members on the silver medal winning American team: Cy Weidenborner, Ed Fitzgerald, Moose Goheen and Tony Conroy.

== Notable players ==
- Moose Goheen – Hockey Hall of Fame inductee
- Taffy Abel – United States Hockey Hall of Fame inductee
- Gerry Geran
- Joe McCormick
- Percy Galbraith
- Cully Wilson
