= 1932–33 CHL season =

American ice hockey season

The 1932–33 CHL season was the second season of the Central Hockey League, a minor professional ice hockey league in the Midwestern United States. Five teams participated in the league, and the Eveleth Rangers won the championship.

== Regular season ==
	GP	W	L	T	GF	GA	Pts
Eveleth Rangers	40	26	12	2	114	83	52
Minneapolis Millers	40	25	13	2	99	78	50
St. Paul Saints	40	13	24	3	83	112	26
Hibbing Maroons	40	11	26	3	79	102	22
Duluth Natives	9	1	8	0	10	28	2
