= 1933–34 CHL season =

American ice hockey season

The 1933–34 CHL season was the third season of the Central Hockey League, a minor professional ice hockey league in the Midwestern United States. Five teams participated in the league, and the Minneapolis Millers won the championship.

== Regular season ==
	GP	W	L	T	GF	GA	Pts
Minneapolis Millers	44	28	11	5	129	86	56
Eveleth Rangers	44	26	14	4	129	86	56
Hibbing Miners	44	22	18	4	129	119	44
St. Paul Saints	44	12	30	2	86	125	24
Duluth Hornets	44	12	27	5	79	119	24
