= Central Hockey League (1931–1935) =

Central Hockey League was an amateur and semi-professional ice hockey league that was active from 1931 to 1935. It was created as a direct result of the Great Depression as a way to allow ice hockey teams to operate without having to pay its players.

== History ==
In the wake of 1929 stock market crash, the depressed economic situation across the country caused problems for many businesses. The St. Paul Saints, unable to continue paying its players, was forced to suspend operations in 1930. The following year, the Minneapolis Millers were faced with a similar situation. However, as the audience in Minnesota still existed, the teams hit on a solution to the problem. Minneapolis left the AHA while St. Paul resumed play as amateur teams. In short order they were joined by three other clubs around the state and were able to put together a new amateur league.

After the first year, the league switched from amateur to semi-professional status, meaning that while teams were now able to pay their players, they were not required to do so at expected rates or intervals. Within a few years, the economic troubles began to wane and as the United States recovered from the depression, the reason for the league began to fade. While no official reason was given for its discontinuation, the CHL began drifting back towards the American Hockey Association in 1934. The two leagues agreed to play an interlocking schedule, where games between league members were counted in their respective standings, for the 1934–35 season. After that year both the Saints and Millers rejoined the AHA leaving the league without a raison d'être. The CHL collapsed without its two flagship teams and the sole remaining team, the Eveleth Rangers, returned to being an independent amateur club.

== Members ==
- Duluth Hornets 1933–34
- Duluth Natives 1932–33
- Eveleth Rangers 1931–35
- Hibbing Maroons 1931–33 / Miners 1933–34
- Minneapolis Millers 1931–35
- St. Paul Saints 1931–35
- Virginia Rockets 1931–32

== Champions ==
- 1931–32 Minneapolis
- 1932–33 Eveleth
- 1933–34 Minneapolis
- 1934–35 St. Paul
