= 1928–29 New York Americans season =

National Hockey League team season

1928–29 New York Americans
- Division: 2nd Canadian
- 1928–29 record: 19–13–12
- Home record: 9–6–7
- Road record: 10–7–5
- Goals for: 53
- Goals against: 53

Team information
- General manager: Tommy Gorman
- Coach: Tommy Gorman
- Captain: Billy Burch
- Arena: Madison Square Garden

Team leaders
- Goals: Billy Burch (11)
- Assists: Billy Burch (5)
- Points: Billy Burch (16)
- Penalty minutes: Lionel Conacher (132)
- Wins: Roy Worters (16)
- Goals against average: Roy Worters (1.15)

The 1928–29 New York Americans season was the fourth season of play of the Americans. After finishing out of the playoffs in the first three seasons, the team placed second in its division to make the playoffs for the first time. The team met the New York Rangers for a two-game total-goals series. The series was won by the Rangers, the only goal an over-time goal in the second game.

== Regular season ==
=== Final standings ===
Canadian Division
	GP	W	L	T	GF	GA	PIM	Pts
**Montreal Canadiens**	44	22	7	15	71	43	465	59
**New York Americans**	44	19	13	12	53	53	486	50
**Toronto Maple Leafs**	44	21	18	5	85	69	541	47
Ottawa Senators	44	14	17	13	54	67	461	41
Montreal Maroons	44	15	20	9	67	65	638	39

Note: W = Wins, L = Losses, T = Ties, GF = Goals For, GA = Goals Against, Pts = Points
Teams that qualified for the playoffs are highlighted in bold.

=== Record vs. opponents ===
==== Vs. Canadian Division ====
1928–29 NHL records
Team	**MTL**	**MTM**	**NYA**	**OTT**	**TOR**	**Total**
M. Canadiens	—	4–0–2	2–1–3	5–0–1	1–3–2	**12–4–8**
M. Maroons	0–4–2	—	2–3–1	2–2–2	2–4	**6–13–5**
N.Y. Americans	1–2–3	3–2–1	—	2–0–4	3–3	**9–7–8**
Ottawa	0–5–1	2–2–2	0–2–4	—	4–1–1	**6–10–8**
Toronto	3–1–2	4–2	3–3	1–4–1	—	**11–10–3**

==== Vs. American Division ====
1928–29 NHL records
Team	**BOS**	**CHI**	**DET**	**NYR**	**PIT**	**Total**
M. Canadiens	2–1–1	4–0	1–1–2	1–1–2	2–0–2	**10–3–7**
M. Maroons	1–3	2–1–1	1–2–1	3–0–1	2–1–1	**9–7–4**
N.Y. Americans	3–0–1	3–1	1–2–1	1–1–2	2–2	**10–6–4**
Ottawa	1–2–1	2–1–1	1–1–2	1–3	3–0–1	**8–7–5**
Toronto	2–2	3–0–1	2–2	1–3	2–1–1	**10–8–2**

== Schedule and results ==
1928–29 regular season
November

Game	Result	Date	Score	Opponent	Record
1	T	November 15, 1928	0–0 OT	@ Ottawa Senators (1928–29)	0–0–1
2	T	November 18, 1928	1–1 OT	New York Rangers (1928–29)	0–0–2
3	W	November 22, 1928	3–0	Toronto Maple Leafs (1928–29)	1–0–2
4	W	November 24, 1928	4–3	@ Montreal Canadiens (1928–29)	2–0–2
5	W	November 27, 1928	1–0	Ottawa Senators (1928–29)	3–0–2

December

Game	Result	Date	Score	Opponent	Record
6	L	December 1, 1928	0–3	@ Toronto Maple Leafs (1928–29)	3–1–2
7	L	December 2, 1928	1–2	@ Detroit Cougars (1928–29)	3–2–2
8	L	December 6, 1928	1–4	@ Montreal Maroons (1928–29)	3–3–2
9	W	December 9, 1928	2–1	Boston Bruins (1928–29)	4–3–2
10	W	December 11, 1928	3–0	@ Boston Bruins (1928–29)	5–3–2
11	W	December 13, 1928	2–1	Montreal Maroons (1928–29)	6–3–2
12	W	December 16, 1928	1–0	@ Chicago Black Hawks (1928–29)	7–3–2
13	W	December 18, 1928	2–0	Pittsburgh Pirates (1928–29)	8–3–2
14	L	December 20, 1928	0–1	@ Pittsburgh Pirates (1928–29)	8–4–2
15	L	December 23, 1928	0–2	Detroit Cougars (1928–29)	8–5–2
16	W	December 25, 1928	1–0	@ New York Rangers (1928–29)	9–5–2
17	L	December 27, 1928	0–2	Chicago Black Hawks (1928–29)	9–6–2
18	T	December 29, 1928	2–2 OT	@ Ottawa Senators (1928–29)	9–6–3

January

Game	Result	Date	Score	Opponent	Record
19	T	January 1, 1929	1–1 OT	Montreal Canadiens (1928–29)	9–6–4
20	T	January 6, 1929	0–0 OT	New York Rangers (1928–29)	9–6–5
21	W	January 10, 1929	2–0	Toronto Maple Leafs (1928–29)	10–6–5
22	W	January 12, 1929	1–0 OT	@ Toronto Maple Leafs (1928–29)	11–6–5
23	T	January 15, 1929	1–1 OT	Ottawa Senators (1928–29)	11–6–6
24	T	January 17, 1929	0–0 OT	@ Montreal Maroons (1928–29)	11–6–7
25	L	January 20, 1929	0–2	Pittsburgh Pirates (1928–29)	11–7–7
26	W	January 24, 1929	2–0	Montreal Maroons (1928–29)	12–7–7
27	W	January 27, 1929	2–1	@ Detroit Cougars (1928–29)	13–7–7
28	L	January 29, 1929	0–1	Montreal Canadiens (1928–29)	13–8–7
29	L	January 31, 1929	1–2	@ New York Rangers (1928–29)	13–9–7

February

Game	Result	Date	Score	Opponent	Record
30	L	February 3, 1929	1–3	Toronto Maple Leafs (1928–29)	13–10–7
31	W	February 5, 1929	1–0	@ Boston Bruins (1928–29)	14–10–7
32	W	February 7, 1929	1–0	Chicago Black Hawks (1928–29)	15–10–7
33	W	February 10, 1929	1–0	@ Chicago Black Hawks (1928–29)	16–10–7
34	T	February 14, 1929	1–1 OT	Detroit Cougars (1928–29)	16–10–8
35	T	February 16, 1929	1–1 OT	@ Montreal Canadiens (1928–29)	16–10–9
36	L	February 19, 1929	0–1	Montreal Maroons (1928–29)	16–11–9
37	W	February 21, 1929	4–2	@ Pittsburgh Pirates (1928–29)	17–11–9
38	T	February 24, 1929	2–2 OT	Boston Bruins (1928–29)	17–11–10
39	T	February 28, 1929	0–0 OT	Montreal Canadiens (1928–29)	17–11–11

March

Game	Result	Date	Score	Opponent	Record
40	T	March 5, 1929	1–1 OT	@ Ottawa Senators (1928–29)	17–11–12
41	W	March 9, 1929	3–2	@ Montreal Maroons (1928–29)	18–11–12
42	W	March 12, 1929	2–1	Ottawa Senators (1928–29)	19–11–12
43	L	March 14, 1929	0–5	@ Toronto Maple Leafs (1928–29)	19–12–12
44	L	March 16, 1929	1–4	@ Montreal Canadiens (1928–29)	19–13–12

Legend: Win (2 points) Loss (0 points) Tie (1 point)

== Playoffs ==
The Americans qualified for the playoff for the first time in history. They lost in the first round by the Rangers 1 goal to 0, or 0–1.

== Player statistics ==
=== Regular season ===
Scoring

Player	GP	G	A	Pts	PIM
Billy Burch	44	11	5	16	45
Normie Himes	44	10	0	10	25
Johnny Sheppard	43	5	4	9	38
Harry Connor	43	6	2	8	83
Charley McVeigh	44	6	2	8	16
Lionel Conacher	44	5	2	7	132
Leo Reise	44	4	1	5	32
Joe Simpson	43	3	2	5	29
Punch Broadbent	44	1	4	5	59
Tex White	13	2	1	3	8
Babe Dye	42	1	0	1	17
Edmond Bouchard	6	0	0	0	2
Jake Forbes	1	0	0	0	0
Jesse Spring	23	0	0	0	0
Flat Walsh	4	0	0	0	0
Roy Worters	38	0	0	0	0

Goaltending

Player	MIN	GP	W	L	T	GA	GAA	SA	SV	SV%	SO
Roy Worters	2390	38	16	12	10	46	1.15				13
Flat Walsh	260	4	2	0	2	1	0.23				3
Jake Forbes	60	1	1	0	0	3	3.00				0
Normie Himes	60	1	0	1	0	3	3.00				0
Team:	2770	44	19	13	12	53	1.15				16

=== Playoffs ===
Scoring

Player	GP	G	A	Pts	PIM
Punch Broadbent	2	0	0	0	2
Billy Burch	2	0	0	0	0
Lionel Conacher	2	0	0	0	10
Harry Connor	2	0	0	0	2
Babe Dye	2	0	0	0	0
Normie Himes	2	0	0	0	0
Charley McVeigh	2	0	0	0	2
Leo Reise	2	0	0	0	0
Johnny Sheppard	2	0	0	0	0
Joe Simpson	2	0	0	0	0
Tex White	2	0	0	0	2
Roy Worters	2	0	0	0	0

Goaltending

Player	MIN	GP	W	L	T	GA	GAA	SA	SV	SV%	SO
Roy Worters	150	2	0	1	1	1	0.40				1
Team:	150	2	0	1	1	1	0.40				1

== Awards and records ==
- Hart Trophy – Roy Worters

== See also ==
- 1928–29 NHL season
