= 1928–29 Toronto Maple Leafs season =

NHL hockey team season

1928–29 Toronto Maple Leafs
- Division: 3rd Canadian
- 1928–29 record: 21–18–5
- Home record: 15–5–2
- Road record: 6–13–3
- Goals for: 85
- Goals against: 69

Team information
- General manager: Conn Smythe
- Coach: Conn Smythe
- Captain: Hap Day
- Arena: Arena Gardens

Team leaders
- Goals: Ace Bailey (22)
- Assists: Andy Blair (15)
- Points: Ace Bailey (32)
- Penalty minutes: Art Smith (91)
- Wins: Lorne Chabot (20)
- Goals against average: Lorne Chabot (1.52)

The 1928–29 Toronto Maple Leafs season featured the first playoffs appearance. The franchise qualified for the playoffs for the first time since the 1924–25 season, after finishing in third position in the Canadian Division. The Maple Leafs defeated the Detroit Cougars before losing to the New York Rangers in the semi-finals.

== Regular season ==
=== Final standings ===
Canadian Division
	GP	W	L	T	GF	GA	PIM	Pts
**Montreal Canadiens**	44	22	7	15	71	43	465	59
**New York Americans**	44	19	13	12	53	53	486	50
**Toronto Maple Leafs**	44	21	18	5	85	69	541	47
Ottawa Senators	44	14	17	13	54	67	461	41
Montreal Maroons	44	15	20	9	67	65	638	39

Note: W = Wins, L = Losses, T = Ties, GF = Goals For, GA = Goals Against, Pts = Points
Teams that qualified for the playoffs are highlighted in bold.

=== Record vs. opponents ===
==== Vs. Canadian Division ====
1928–29 NHL records
Team	MTL	MTM	NYA	OTT	TOR	Total
M. Canadiens	—	4–0–2	2–1–3	5–0–1	1–3–2	**12–4–8**
M. Maroons	0–4–2	—	2–3–1	2–2–2	2–4	**6–13–5**
N.Y. Americans	1–2–3	3–2–1	—	2–0–4	3–3	**9–7–8**
Ottawa	0–5–1	2–2–2	0–2–4	—	4–1–1	**6–10–8**
Toronto	3–1–2	4–2	3–3	1–4–1	—	**11–10–3**

==== Vs. American Division ====
1928–29 NHL records
Team	BOS	CHI	DET	NYR	PIT	Total
M. Canadiens	2–1–1	4–0	1–1–2	1–1–2	2–0–2	**10–3–7**
M. Maroons	1–3	2–1–1	1–2–1	3–0–1	2–1–1	**9–7–4**
N.Y. Americans	3–0–1	3–1	1–2–1	1–1–2	2–2	**10–6–4**
Ottawa	1–2–1	2–1–1	1–1–2	1–3	3–0–1	**8–7–5**
Toronto	2–2	3–0–1	2–2	1–3	2–1–1	**10–8–2**

== Schedule and results ==
1928–29 regular season
November

Game	Result	Date	Score	Opponent	Record
1	W	November 15, 1928	2–0	Chicago Black Hawks (1928–29)	1–0–0
2	W	November 17, 1928	4–2	Montreal Canadiens (1928–29)	2–0–0
3	L	November 20, 1928	1–4	@ Ottawa Senators (1928–29)	2–1–0
4	L	November 22, 1928	0–3	@ New York Americans (1928–29)	2–2–0
5	W	November 24, 1928	4–1	Montreal Maroons (1928–29)	3–2–0
6	L	November 27, 1928	0–4	@ Montreal Maroons (1928–29)	3–3–0

December

Game	Result	Date	Score	Opponent	Record
7	W	December 1, 1928	3–0	New York Americans (1928–29)	4–3–0
8	W	December 4, 1928	3–1	@ Montreal Canadiens (1928–29)	5–3–0
9	L	December 8, 1928	1–2 OT	Ottawa Senators (1928–29)	5–4–0
10	L	December 11, 1928	2–3	@ New York Rangers (1928–29)	5–5–0
11	W	December 15, 1928	2–0	Boston Bruins (1928–29)	6–5–0
12	L	December 20, 1928	3–6	@ Montreal Maroons (1928–29)	6–6–0
13	L	December 22, 1928	2–3	Pittsburgh Pirates (1928–29)	6–7–0
14	W	December 25, 1928	4–1	Montreal Maroons (1928–29)	7–7–0
15	W	December 27, 1928	2–0	@ Pittsburgh Pirates (1928–29)	8–7–0
16	W	December 29, 1928	4–3	Detroit Cougars (1928–29)	9–7–0

January

Game	Result	Date	Score	Opponent	Record
17	L	January 1, 1929	2–3	New York Rangers (1928–29)	9–8–0
18	W	January 3, 1929	2–0	@ Chicago Black Hawks (1928–29)	10–8–0
19	W	January 5, 1929	3–1	Ottawa Senators (1928–29)	11–8–0
20	L	January 8, 1929	2–5	@ Boston Bruins (1928–29)	11–9–0
21	L	January 10, 1929	0–2	@ New York Americans (1928–29)	11–10–0
22	L	January 12, 1929	0–1 OT	New York Americans (1928–29)	11–11–0
23	T	January 17, 1929	1–1 OT	Montreal Canadiens (1928–29)	11–11–1
24	L	January 20, 1929	1–2	@ Detroit Cougars (1928–29)	11–12–1
25	L	January 22, 1929	0–1	@ New York Rangers (1928–29)	11–13–1
26	T	January 24, 1929	1–1 OT	@ Montreal Canadiens (1928–29)	11–13–2
27	W	January 26, 1929	2–0	Chicago Black Hawks (1928–29)	12–13–2
28	L	January 29, 1929	2–4 OT	@ Ottawa Senators (1928–29)	12–14–2
29	L	January 31, 1929	1–3	Boston Bruins (1928–29)	12–15–2

February

Game	Result	Date	Score	Opponent	Record
30	W	February 2, 1929	3–0	@ Boston Bruins (1928–29)	13–15–2
31	W	February 3, 1929	3–1	@ New York Americans (1928–29)	14–15–2
32	T	February 5, 1929	0–0 OT	@ Pittsburgh Pirates (1928–29)	14–15–3
33	W	February 9, 1929	2–1	Pittsburgh Pirates (1928–29)	15–15–3
34	W	February 14, 1929	3–1	New York Rangers (1928–29)	16–15–3
35	W	February 16, 1929	3–0	Montreal Maroons (1928–29)	17–15–3
36	L	February 17, 1929	0–2	@ Detroit Cougars (1928–29)	17–16–3
37	W	February 23, 1929	2–1	Montreal Canadiens (1928–29)	18–16–3
38	W	February 28, 1929	4–0	@ Montreal Maroons (1928–29)	19–16–3

March

Game	Result	Date	Score	Opponent	Record
39	T	March 2, 1929	1–1 OT	Ottawa Senators (1928–29)	19–16–4
40	T	March 7, 1929	1–1 OT	@ Chicago Black Hawks (1928–29)	19–16–5
41	W	March 9, 1929	3–0	Detroit Cougars (1928–29)	20–16–5
42	L	March 12, 1929	1–2	@ Montreal Canadiens (1928–29)	20–17–5
43	W	March 14, 1929	5–0	New York Americans (1928–29)	21–17–5
44	L	March 16, 1929	0–2	@ Ottawa Senators (1928–29)	21–18–5

Legend: Win (2 points) Loss (0 points) Tie (1 point)

== Playoffs ==
In their first playoff appearance the Maple Leafs met the Detroit Cougars in the two game total goals quarterfinals, and won 7–2. The Leafs next faced the New York Rangers in a best-of-three series, losing 2–0.

1929 Stanley Cup playoffs
Quarterfinals vs. (A3) Detroit Cougars – Maple Leafs win 7 goals to 2 goals

Game	Date	Visitor	Visitor goals	Home	Home goals	OT
1	March 19	Detroit Cougars	1	Toronto Maple Leafs	3	
2	March 21	Toronto Maple Leafs	4	Detroit Cougars	1	

Semifinals vs. (A2) New York Rangers – Rangers win 2–0

Game	Date	Visitor	Visitor goals	Home	Home goals	OT
1	March 24	New York Rangers	1	Toronto Maple Leafs	0	
2	March 26	Toronto Maple Leafs	1	New York Rangers	2	OT

Legend: Win Loss

== Player statistics ==
=== Regular season ===
Scoring

Player	Pos	GP	G	A	Pts	PIM
Ace Bailey	RW	44	22	10	32	78
Andy Blair	C	44	12	15	27	41
Danny Cox	LW	42	12	7	19	14
Gerry Lowrey	LW	32	3	11	14	24
Bill Carson	C	24	7	6	13	45
George Horne	RW	39	9	3	12	32
Hap Day	D	44	6	6	12	84
Art Duncan	D	39	4	4	8	53
Eric Pettinger	LW/C	25	3	3	6	24
Art Smith	D	43	5	0	5	91
Baldy Cotton	LW	11	1	2	3	8
Jack Arbour	D	10	1	0	1	10
Joe Primeau	C	6	0	1	1	2
Lorne Chabot	G	43	0	0	0	2
Benny Grant	G	3	0	0	0	0
Alex Gray	RW	7	0	0	0	2
Red Horner	D	22	0	0	0	30
Carl Voss	C	2	0	0	0	0

Goaltending

Player	MIN	GP	W	L	T	GA	GAA	SO
Lorne Chabot	2562	44	20	17	5	65	1.52	10
Benny Grant	156	5	1	1	0	4	1.54	0
Red Horner	2	1	0	0	0	0	0.00	0
Team:	2720	44	21	18	5	69	1.52	10

=== Playoffs ===
Scoring

Player	Pos	GP	G	A	Pts	PIM
Andy Blair	C	4	3	0	3	2
Ace Bailey	RW	4	1	2	3	4
Art Smith	D	4	1	1	2	8
Hap Day	D	4	1	0	1	4
Red Horner	D	4	1	0	1	2
Eric Pettinger	LW/C	4	1	0	1	8
Danny Cox	LW	4	0	1	1	4
Lorne Chabot	G	4	0	0	0	0
Baldy Cotton	LW	4	0	0	0	2
Art Duncan	D	4	0	0	0	4
Alex Gray	RW	4	0	0	0	0
George Horne	RW	4	0	0	0	4

Goaltending

Player	MIN	GP	W	L	GA	GAA	SO
Lorne Chabot	242	4	2	2	5	1.24	0
Team:	242	4	2	2	5	1.24	0

Note:

Pos = Position;GP = Games played; G = Goals; A = Assists; Pts = Points; PIM = Penalty minutes; +/- = Plus/minus; PPG = Power-play goals; SHG = Short-handed goals; GWG = Game-winning goals
Pos = Position;GP = Games played; Min, TOI = Minutes played; W = Wins; L = Losses; T,T/OT = Ties; OTL = Overtime losses; GA = Goals-against; GAA = Goals-against average; SO = Shutouts; SA = Shots against; SV = Shots saved;SV% = Save percentage;

== Transactions ==
- June 20, 1928: Traded Eddie Rodden to the Boston Bruins for cash
- July 17, 1928: Signed Free Agent Joe Primeau
- October 1, 1928: Acquired George Horne from the Montreal Maroons for Fred Elliott
- October 18, 1928: Acquired Lorne Chabot and $10,000 from the New York Rangers for John Ross Roach
- November 27, 1928: Traded Dave Trottier to the Montreal Maroons for $15,000
- November 28, 1928: Traded Alex Gray to the Toronto Ravinas of the CPHL for cash
- December 12, 1928: Traded Jack Arbour to the London Panthers of the CPHL for cash
- January 10, 1929: Acquired Eric Pettinger and Hugh Plaxton from the Boston Bruins for George Owen
- January 12, 1929: Signed Free Agent Clem Loughlin
- January 20, 1929: Signed Free Agent Red Horner
- January 25, 1929: Traded Bill Carson to the Boston Bruins for cash
- February 12, 1929: Acquired Baldy Cotton from the Pittsburgh Pirates for Gerry Lowrey and $9,500

== See also ==
- 1928–29 NHL season
