= 1928–29 Montreal Maroons season =

National Hockey League team season

1928–29 Montreal Maroons
- Division: 5th Canadian
- 1928–29 record: 15–20–9
- Home record: 11–8–3
- Road record: 4–12–6
- Goals for: 67
- Goals against: 65

Team information
- Coach: Eddie Gerard
- Captain: Nels Stewart
- Arena: Montreal Forum

Team leaders
- Goals: Nels Stewart (21)
- Assists: Hooley Smith (9)
- Points: Nels Stewart (29)
- Penalty minutes: Red Dutton (141)
- Wins: Clint Benedict (14)
- Goals against average: Flat Walsh (1.07)

The 1928–29 Montreal Maroons season was the fifth season for the National Hockey League (NHL) franchise. The Maroons didn't qualify for the playoffs.

== Regular season ==
=== Final standings ===
Canadian Division
	GP	W	L	T	GF	GA	PIM	Pts
**Montreal Canadiens**	44	22	7	15	71	43	465	59
**New York Americans**	44	19	13	12	53	53	486	50
**Toronto Maple Leafs**	44	21	18	5	85	69	541	47
Ottawa Senators	44	14	17	13	54	67	461	41
Montreal Maroons	44	15	20	9	67	65	638	39

Note: W = Wins, L = Losses, T = Ties, GF = Goals For, GA = Goals Against, Pts = Points
Teams that qualified for the playoffs are highlighted in bold.

=== Record vs. opponents ===
==== Vs. Canadian Division ====
1928–29 NHL records
Team	**MTL**	**MTM**	**NYA**	**OTT**	**TOR**	**Total**
M. Canadiens	—	4–0–2	2–1–3	5–0–1	1–3–2	**12–4–8**
M. Maroons	0–4–2	—	2–3–1	2–2–2	2–4	**6–13–5**
N.Y. Americans	1–2–3	3–2–1	—	2–0–4	3–3	**9–7–8**
Ottawa	0–5–1	2–2–2	0–2–4	—	4–1–1	**6–10–8**
Toronto	3–1–2	4–2	3–3	1–4–1	—	**11–10–3**

==== Vs. American Division ====
1928–29 NHL records
Team	**BOS**	**CHI**	**DET**	**NYR**	**PIT**	**Total**
M. Canadiens	2–1–1	4–0	1–1–2	1–1–2	2–0–2	**10–3–7**
M. Maroons	1–3	2–1–1	1–2–1	3–0–1	2–1–1	**9–7–4**
N.Y. Americans	3–0–1	3–1	1–2–1	1–1–2	2–2	**10–6–4**
Ottawa	1–2–1	2–1–1	1–1–2	1–3	3–0–1	**8–7–5**
Toronto	2–2	3–0–1	2–2	1–3	2–1–1	**10–8–2**

== Schedule and results ==
1928–29 regular season
November

Game	Result	Date	Score	Opponent	Record
1	L	November 15, 1928	1–3	@ Montreal Canadiens (1928–29)	0–1–0
2	W	November 17, 1928	4–2	Chicago Black Hawks (1928–29)	1–1–0
3	W	November 20, 1928	1–0	@ New York Rangers (1928–29)	2–1–0
4	L	November 22, 1928	0–1	Ottawa Senators (1928–29)	2–2–0
5	L	November 24, 1928	1–4	@ Toronto Maple Leafs (1928–29)	2–3–0
6	W	November 27, 1928	4–0	Toronto Maple Leafs (1928–29)	3–3–0
7	T	November 29, 1928	1–1 OT	@ Detroit Cougars (1928–29)	3–3–1

December

Game	Result	Date	Score	Opponent	Record
8	W	December 1, 1928	3–0	New York Rangers (1928–29)	4–3–1
9	W	December 6, 1928	4–1	New York Americans (1928–29)	5–3–1
10	L	December 8, 1928	1–5	@ Boston Bruins (1928–29)	5–4–1
11	W	December 11, 1928	2–1	Detroit Cougars (1928–29)	6–4–1
12	L	December 13, 1928	1–2	@ New York Americans (1928–29)	6–5–1
13	T	December 15, 1928	0–0 OT	Montreal Canadiens (1928–29)	6–5–2
14	W	December 18, 1928	2–1	@ Ottawa Senators (1928–29)	7–5–2
15	W	December 20, 1928	6–3	Toronto Maple Leafs (1928–29)	8–5–2
16	L	December 25, 1928	1–4	@ Toronto Maple Leafs (1928–29)	8–6–2
17	L	December 29, 1928	2–3	Pittsburgh Pirates (1928–29)	8–7–2

January

Game	Result	Date	Score	Opponent	Record
18	W	January 1, 1929	4–2	@ Pittsburgh Pirates (1928–29)	9–7–2
19	L	January 3, 1929	0–1	Boston Bruins (1928–29)	9–8–2
20	T	January 5, 1929	0–0 OT	@ Montreal Canadiens (1928–29)	9–8–3
21	T	January 8, 1929	1–1 OT	Ottawa Senators (1928–29)	9–8–4
22	T	January 10, 1929	1–1 OT	@ Chicago Black Hawks (1928–29)	9–8–5
23	L	January 12, 1929	1–3	Montreal Canadiens (1928–29)	9–9–5
24	T	January 17, 1929	0–0 OT	New York Americans (1928–29)	9–9–6
25	T	January 19, 1929	1–1 OT	@ Ottawa Senators (1928–29)	9–9–7
26	L	January 22, 1929	0–1 OT	Detroit Cougars (1928–29)	9–10–7
27	L	January 24, 1929	0–2	@ New York Americans (1928–29)	9–11–7
28	W	January 26, 1929	2–0	Pittsburgh Pirates (1928–29)	10–11–7
29	W	January 31, 1929	2–0	Chicago Black Hawks (1928–29)	11–11–7

February

Game	Result	Date	Score	Opponent	Record
30	T	February 2, 1929	0–0 OT	@ Pittsburgh Pirates (1928–29)	11–11–8
31	T	February 5, 1929	1–1 OT	@ New York Rangers (1928–29)	11–11–9
32	W	February 9, 1929	1–0	Boston Bruins (1928–29)	12–11–9
33	L	February 12, 1929	1–2	@ Ottawa Senators (1928–29)	12–12–9
34	W	February 14, 1929	4–0	Ottawa Senators (1928–29)	13–12–9
35	L	February 16, 1929	0–3	@ Toronto Maple Leafs (1928–29)	13–13–9
36	W	February 19, 1929	1–0	@ New York Americans (1928–29)	14–13–9
37	L	February 21, 1929	0–1	@ Montreal Canadiens (1928–29)	14–14–9
38	W	February 23, 1929	9–1	New York Rangers (1928–29)	15–14–9
39	L	February 26, 1929	0–1	@ Boston Bruins (1928–29)	15–15–9
40	L	February 28, 1929	0–4	Toronto Maple Leafs (1928–29)	15–16–9

March

Game	Result	Date	Score	Opponent	Record
41	L	March 2, 1929	1–2	@ Chicago Black Hawks (1928–29)	15–17–9
42	L	March 5, 1929	1–3	@ Detroit Cougars (1928–29)	15–18–9
43	L	March 9, 1929	2–3	New York Americans (1928–29)	15–19–9
44	L	March 14, 1929	0–1	Montreal Canadiens (1928–29)	15–20–9

Legend: Win (2 points) Loss (0 points) Tie (1 point)

== Player statistics ==
=== Regular season ===
Scoring

Player	Pos	GP	G	A	Pts	PIM
Nels Stewart	C	44	21	8	29	74
Jimmy Ward	RW	43	14	8	22	46
Hooley Smith	C/RW	41	10	9	19	120
Merlyn Phillips	C	42	6	5	11	41
Babe Siebert	LW/D	40	3	5	8	52
Dave Trottier	LW	37	2	4	6	69
Joe Lamb	RW	30	4	1	5	44
Red Dutton	D	44	1	3	4	139
Earl Robinson	RW/C	38	2	1	3	2
Henry Hicks	D	44	2	0	2	27
Georges Boucher	D	12	1	1	2	10
Russell Oatman	LW	11	1	0	1	12
Clint Benedict	G	37	0	0	0	0
Cliff McBride	RW/D	1	0	0	0	0
Dunc Munro	D	1	0	0	0	0
Baldy Northcott	D/LW	5	0	0	0	0
Flat Walsh	G	7	0	0	0	0

Goaltending

Player	MIN	GP	W	L	T	GA	GAA	SO
Clint Benedict	2300	37	14	16	7	57	1.49	11
Flat Walsh	450	7	1	4	2	8	1.07	1
Team:	2750	44	15	20	9	65	1.42	12

Note: GP = Games played; G = Goals; A = Assists; Pts = Points; +/- = Plus/minus; PIM = Penalty minutes; PPG = Power-play goals; SHG = Short-handed goals; GWG = Game-winning goals
MIN = Minutes played; W = Wins; L = Losses; T = Ties; GA = Goals against; GAA = Goals against average; SO = Shutouts;

== See also ==
- 1928–29 NHL season
