= 1928–29 Montreal Canadiens season =

NHL hockey team season

1928–29 Montreal Canadiens
- O'Brien Trophy winners
- Division: 1st Canadian
- 1928–29 record: 22–7–15
- Home record: 12–4–6
- Road record: 10–3–9
- Goals for: 71
- Goals against: 43

Team information
- General manager: Leo Dandurand
- Coach: Cecil Hart
- Captain: Sylvio Mantha
- Arena: Montreal Forum

Team leaders
- Goals: Howie Morenz (17)
- Assists: Howie Morenz (10)
- Points: Howie Morenz (27)
- Penalty minutes: Albert Leduc (79)
- Wins: George Hainsworth (22)
- Goals against average: George Hainsworth (0.92)

The 1928–29 Montreal Canadiens season was the team's 20th season, and 12th in the National Hockey League (NHL). The team repeated its first-place finish in the Canadian Division and qualified for the playoffs. The Canadiens lost in the semi-finals against the Boston Bruins.

== Regular season ==
The New York Americans, last place finishers in 1927–28, surprised everyone by occupying first place for much of the season in the Canadian Division. However, the Montreal Canadiens dislodged the Americans and finished first. George Hainsworth, Canadiens goaltender, set an unprecedented record of 22 shutouts and a 0.98 goals against average.

=== Final standings ===
Canadian Division
	GP	W	L	T	GF	GA	PIM	Pts
**Montreal Canadiens**	44	22	7	15	71	43	465	59
**New York Americans**	44	19	13	12	53	53	486	50
**Toronto Maple Leafs**	44	21	18	5	85	69	541	47
Ottawa Senators	44	14	17	13	54	67	461	41
Montreal Maroons	44	15	20	9	67	65	638	39

Note: W = Wins, L = Losses, T = Ties, GF = Goals For, GA = Goals Against, Pts = Points
Teams that qualified for the playoffs are highlighted in bold.

=== Record vs. opponents ===
==== Vs. Canadian Division ====
1928–29 NHL records
Team	**MTL**	**MTM**	**NYA**	**OTT**	**TOR**	**Total**
M. Canadiens	—	4–0–2	2–1–3	5–0–1	1–3–2	**12–4–8**
M. Maroons	0–4–2	—	2–3–1	2–2–2	2–4	**6–13–5**
N.Y. Americans	1–2–3	3–2–1	—	2–0–4	3–3	**9–7–8**
Ottawa	0–5–1	2–2–2	0–2–4	—	4–1–1	**6–10–8**
Toronto	3–1–2	4–2	3–3	1–4–1	—	**11–10–3**

==== Vs. American Division ====
1928–29 NHL records
Team	**BOS**	**CHI**	**DET**	**NYR**	**PIT**	**Total**
M. Canadiens	2–1–1	4–0	1–1–2	1–1–2	2–0–2	**10–3–7**
M. Maroons	1–3	2–1–1	1–2–1	3–0–1	2–1–1	**9–7–4**
N.Y. Americans	3–0–1	3–1	1–2–1	1–1–2	2–2	**10–6–4**
Ottawa	1–2–1	2–1–1	1–1–2	1–3	3–0–1	**8–7–5**
Toronto	2–2	3–0–1	2–2	1–3	2–1–1	**10–8–2**

== Schedule and results ==
1928–29 regular season
November

Game	Result	Date	Score	Opponent	Record
1	W	November 15, 1928	3–1	Montreal Maroons (1928–29)	1–0–0
2	L	November 17, 1928	2–4	@ Toronto Maple Leafs (1928–29)	1–1–0
3	W	November 20, 1928	1–0	@ Boston Bruins (1928–29)	2–1–0
4	T	November 22, 1928	0–0 OT	@ Pittsburgh Pirates (1928–29)	2–1–1
5	L	November 24, 1928	3–4	New York Americans (1928–29)	2–2–1
6	T	November 29, 1928	1–1 OT	Pittsburgh Pirates (1928–29)	2–2–2

December

Game	Result	Date	Score	Opponent	Record
7	W	December 1, 1928	2–0	@ Ottawa Senators (1928–29)	3–2–2
8	L	December 4, 1928	1–3	Toronto Maple Leafs (1928–29)	3–3–2
9	W	December 8, 1928	2–1	Chicago Black Hawks (1928–29)	4–3–2
10	L	December 13, 1928	2–3 OT	New York Rangers (1928–29)	4–4–2
11	T	December 15, 1928	0–0 OT	@ Montreal Maroons (1928–29)	4–4–3
12	W	December 18, 1928	5–0	@ Chicago Black Hawks (1928–29)	5–4–3
13	L	December 20, 1928	1–5	@ Detroit Cougars (1928–29)	5–5–3
14	W	December 22, 1928	1–0	Ottawa Senators (1928–29)	6–5–3
15	W	December 27, 1928	3–0	Detroit Cougars (1928–29)	7–5–3

January

Game	Result	Date	Score	Opponent	Record
16	T	January 1, 1929	1–1 OT	@ New York Americans (1928–29)	7–5–4
17	T	January 3, 1929	1–1 OT	@ Ottawa Senators (1928–29)	7–5–5
18	T	January 5, 1929	0–0 OT	Montreal Maroons (1928–29)	7–5–6
19	L	January 10, 1929	2–4	Boston Bruins (1928–29)	7–6–6
20	W	January 12, 1929	3–1	@ Montreal Maroons (1928–29)	8–6–6
21	W	January 15, 1929	1–0	Chicago Black Hawks (1928–29)	9–6–6
22	T	January 17, 1929	1–1 OT	@ Toronto Maple Leafs (1928–29)	9–6–7
23	T	January 19, 1929	0–0 OT	New York Rangers (1928–29)	9–6–8
24	W	January 20, 1929	1–0	@ New York Rangers (1928–29)	10–6–8
25	T	January 22, 1929	0–0 OT	@ Boston Bruins (1928–29)	10–6–9
26	T	January 24, 1929	1–1 OT	Toronto Maple Leafs (1928–29)	10–6–10
27	W	January 26, 1929	2–1	@ Ottawa Senators (1928–29)	11–6–10
28	W	January 29, 1929	1–0	@ New York Americans (1928–29)	12–6–10

February

Game	Result	Date	Score	Opponent	Record
29	W	February 2, 1929	1–0	Ottawa Senators (1928–29)	13–6–10
30	T	February 7, 1929	2–2 OT	Detroit Cougars (1928–29)	13–6–11
31	T	February 10, 1929	3–3 OT	@ New York Rangers (1928–29)	13–6–12
32	W	February 12, 1929	2–0	@ Pittsburgh Pirates (1928–29)	14–6–12
33	W	February 14, 1929	1–0	@ Chicago Black Hawks (1928–29)	15–6–12
34	T	February 16, 1929	1–1 OT	New York Americans (1928–29)	15–6–13
35	W	February 21, 1929	1–0	Montreal Maroons (1928–29)	16–6–13
36	L	February 23, 1929	1–2	@ Toronto Maple Leafs (1928–29)	16–7–13
37	W	February 26, 1929	4–0	Pittsburgh Pirates (1928–29)	17–7–13
38	T	February 28, 1929	0–0 OT	@ New York Americans (1928–29)	17–7–14

March

Game	Result	Date	Score	Opponent	Record
39	W	March 2, 1929	3–0	Boston Bruins (1928–29)	18–7–14
40	W	March 7, 1929	3–0	Ottawa Senators (1928–29)	19–7–14
41	T	March 10, 1929	1–1 OT	@ Detroit Cougars (1928–29)	19–7–15
42	W	March 12, 1929	2–1	Toronto Maple Leafs (1928–29)	20–7–15
43	W	March 14, 1929	1–0	@ Montreal Maroons (1928–29)	21–7–15
44	W	March 16, 1929	4–1	New York Americans (1928–29)	22–7–15

Legend: Win (2 points) Loss (0 points) Tie (1 point)

== Playoffs ==
The Canadiens received a first-round bye and met the Boston Bruins in the semi-finals. In a best-of-five series, the Bruins defeated the Canadiens in three straight. The games were very defensive, Boston scoring five goals in the three games, Montreal only two.

Date	Home	Score	Visitors	Score	Record
March 19	Boston	1	Montreal	0	0–1
March 21	Boston	1	Montreal	0	0–2
March 23	Montreal	2	Boston	3	0–3

== Player statistics ==
=== Regular season ===
Scoring

Player	GP	G	A	Pts	PIM
Howie Morenz	42	17	10	27	47
Aurel Joliat	44	12	5	17	59
Sylvio Mantha	44	9	4	13	56
Albert Leduc	43	9	2	11	79
Art Gagne	44	7	3	10	52
George Patterson	44	4	5	9	34
Pit Lepine	44	6	1	7	48
Armand Mondou	32	3	4	7	6
Marty Burke	44	4	2	6	68
Gerry Carson	26	0	0	0	4
Herb Gardiner	7	0	0	0	0
Leo Gaudreault	11	0	0	0	4
George Hainsworth	44	0	0	0	0
Wildor Larochelle	2	0	0	0	0
Art Lesieur	15	0	0	0	0
Georges Mantha	21	0	0	0	8
Pete Palangio	2	0	0	0	0

Goaltending

Player	MIN	GP	W	L	T	GA	GAA	SA	SV	SV%	SO
George Hainsworth	2800	44	22	7	15	43	0.92				22
Team:	2800	44	22	7	15	43	0.92				22

=== Playoffs ===
Scoring

Player	GP	G	A	Pts	PIM
Aurel Joliat	3	1	1	2	10
Albert Leduc	3	1	0	1	4
Marty Burke	3	0	0	0	8
Art Gagne	3	0	0	0	12
Herb Gardiner	3	0	0	0	2
George Hainsworth	3	0	0	0	0
Pit Lepine	3	0	0	0	2
Georges Mantha	3	0	0	0	0
Sylvio Mantha	3	0	0	0	0
Armand Mondou	3	0	0	0	2
Howie Morenz	3	0	0	0	6
George Patterson	3	0	0	0	2

Goaltending

Player	MIN	GP	W	L	T	GA	GAA	SA	SV	SV%	SO
George Hainsworth	180	3	0	3	0	5	1.67				0
Team:	180	3	0	3	0	5	1.67				0

== Awards and records ==
- O'Brien Cup – First place in Canadian division.

== See also ==
- 1928–29 NHL season
