= 1928–29 Ottawa Senators season =

Professional ice hockey team season of play

1928–29 Ottawa Senators
- Division: 4th Canadian
- 1928–29 record: 14–17–13
- Home record: 7–6–9
- Road record: 7–11–4
- Goals for: 54
- Goals against: 67

Team information
- General manager: Dave Gill
- Coach: Dave Gill
- Captain: King Clancy
- Arena: Ottawa Auditorium

Team leaders
- Goals: Frank Finnigan (15)
- Assists: Hec Kilrea & Alex Smith (7)
- Points: Frank Finnigan (19)
- Penalty minutes: Alex Smith (96)
- Wins: Alec Connell (14)
- Goals against average: Alec Connell (1.43)

The 1928–29 Ottawa Senators season was the club's 12th season in the NHL, 44th overall. The Senators' financial troubles continued, as the team sold Punch Broadbent to the New York Americans. There were numerous rumours that the team was going to be sold to a group from Chicago: Senators owner Frank Ahearn denied this, but admitted that the team was for sale to the highest bidder. Once again, for the second straight year, the Senators would play two "home" games in Detroit due to poor fan support when US-based teams would play games in Ottawa.

== Team business ==
The team was sold in February 1929 to the Ottawa Auditorium for CA$125,000 (equivalent to $2,230,978 in 2025). Ahearn had had offers rumoured to be as high as $250,000, but chose to keep the ownership local. As well, Ahearn was a shareholder in the Auditorium which stood to lose its prime tenant. The shareholders of the Auditorium financed the purchase with $125,000 of preferred shares in the Auditorium. NHL president Frank Calder addressed an Ottawa Rotary Club meeting that February, and told the attendees: "The team cannot live on tradition and sentiment. In the last analysis, it depends on the people of Ottawa whether the team remains or not."

== Regular season ==
On the ice, the Senators struggled to score goals, scoring only 54, the fourth fewest in the league. Frank Finnigan scored 15 of them to lead the team, and finish with a club high of 19 points. New captain King Clancy scored 13 goals to lead the defense. Midway through the season, the Sens traded longtime player Buck Boucher to the Montreal Maroons in exchange for youngster Joe Lamb.

Alec Connell was steady in the Senators' net, winning 14 games, and having a GAA of 1.43, along with seven shutouts.

The Senators failed to qualify for the playoffs for the first time since 1925, as they finished in fourth place in the five-team Canadian Division.

=== Final standings ===
Canadian Division
	GP	W	L	T	GF	GA	PIM	Pts
**Montreal Canadiens**	44	22	7	15	71	43	465	59
**New York Americans**	44	19	13	12	53	53	486	50
**Toronto Maple Leafs**	44	21	18	5	85	69	541	47
Ottawa Senators	44	14	17	13	54	67	461	41
Montreal Maroons	44	15	20	9	67	65	638	39

Note: W = Wins, L = Losses, T = Ties, GF = Goals For, GA = Goals Against, Pts = Points
Teams that qualified for the playoffs are highlighted in bold.

=== Record vs. opponents ===
==== Vs. Canadian Division ====
1928–29 NHL records
Team	MTL	MTM	NYA	OTT	TOR	Total
M. Canadiens	—	4–0–2	2–1–3	5–0–1	1–3–2	**12–4–8**
M. Maroons	0–4–2	—	2–3–1	2–2–2	2–4	**6–13–5**
N.Y. Americans	1–2–3	3–2–1	—	2–0–4	3–3	**9–7–8**
Ottawa	0–5–1	2–2–2	0–2–4	—	4–1–1	**6–10–8**
Toronto	3–1–2	4–2	3–3	1–4–1	—	**11–10–3**

==== Vs. American Division ====
1928–29 NHL records
Team	BOS	CHI	DET	NYR	PIT	Total
M. Canadiens	2–1–1	4–0	1–1–2	1–1–2	2–0–2	**10–3–7**
M. Maroons	1–3	2–1–1	1–2–1	3–0–1	2–1–1	**9–7–4**
N.Y. Americans	3–0–1	3–1	1–2–1	1–1–2	2–2	**10–6–4**
Ottawa	1–2–1	2–1–1	1–1–2	1–3	3–0–1	**8–7–5**
Toronto	2–2	3–0–1	2–2	1–3	2–1–1	**10–8–2**

== Schedule and results ==
1928–29 regular season
November: 2–1–3 (home: 1–0–3; road: 1–1–0)

Game	Date	Visitor	Score	Home	OT	Decision	Attendance	Arena	Record	Pts
1	November 15	Americans	0–0	Ottawa	OT	Connell	N/A	Ottawa Auditorium	0–0–1	1
2	November 17	Boston	0–0	Ottawa	OT	Connell	N/A	Ottawa Auditorium	0–0–2	2
3	November 20	Toronto	1–4	Ottawa		Connell	N/A	Ottawa Auditorium	1–0–2	4
4	November 22	Ottawa	1–0	Maroons		Connell	N/A	Montreal Forum	2–0–2	6
5	November 24	Detroit	1–1	Ottawa	OT	Connell	N/A	Ottawa Auditorium	2–0–3	7
6	November 27	Ottawa	0–1	Americans		Connell	N/A	Madison Square Garden	2–1–3	7

December: 2–5–3 (home: 1–2–2; road: 1–3–1)

Game	Date	Visitor	Score	Home	OT	Decision	Attendance	Arena	Record	Pts
7	December 2	Canadiens	2–0	Ottawa		Connell	N/A	Ottawa Auditorium	2–2–3	7
8	December 6	Chicago	0–2	Ottawa		Connell	N/A	Ottawa Auditorium	3–2–3	9
9	December 8	Ottawa	2–1	Toronto	OT	Connell	N/A	Mutual Street Arena	4–2–3	11
10	December 11	Ottawa	1–2	Chicago		Connell	N/A	Chicago Coliseum	4–3–3	11
11	December 13	Ottawa	1–1	Detroit		Connell	N/A	Detroit Olympia	4–3–4	12
12	December 15	Pittsburgh	0–0	Ottawa	OT	Connell	N/A	Ottawa Auditorium	4–3–5	13
13	December 18	Maroons	2–1	Ottawa		Connell	N/A	Ottawa Auditorium	4–4–5	13
14	December 20	Ottawa	0–1	Rangers		Connell	N/A	Madison Square Garden	4–5–5	13
15	December 22	Ottawa	0–1	Canadiens		Connell	N/A	Madison Square Garden	4–6–5	13
16	December 29	Americans	2–2	Ottawa	OT	Connell	N/A	Ottawa Auditorium	4–6–6	14

January: 2–4–5 (home: 1–2–3; road: 1–2–2)

Game	Date	Visitor	Score	Home	OT	Decision	Attendance	Arena	Record	Pts
17	January 1	Ottawa	0–3	Boston		Connell	N/A	Boston Madison Square Garden	4–7–6	14
18	January 3	Canadiens	1–1	Ottawa	OT	Connell	N/A	Ottawa Auditorium	4–7–7	15
19	January 5	Ottawa	1–3	Toronto		Connell	N/A	Mutual Street Arena	4–8–7	15
20	January 8	Ottawa	1–1	Maroons	OT	Connell	N/A	Montreal Forum	4–8–8	16
21	January 10	Rangers	9–3	Ottawa		Connell	N/A	Ottawa Auditorium	4–9–8	16
22	January 12	Ottawa	2–1	Pittsburgh		Connell	N/A	Duquesne Garden	5–9–8	18
23	January 15	Ottawa	1–1	Americans	OT	Connell	N/A	Madison Square Garden	5–9–9	19
24	January 19	Maroons	1–1	Ottawa	OT	Connell	N/A	Ottawa Auditorium	5–9–10	20
25	January 22	Chicago	1–1	Ottawa	OT	Connell	N/A	Ottawa Auditorium	5–9–11	21
26	January 26	Canadiens	2–1	Ottawa		Connell	N/A	Ottawa Auditorium	5–10–11	21
27	January 29	Toronto	2–4	Ottawa	OT	Connell	N/A	Ottawa Auditorium	6–10–11	23

February: 6–5–0 (home: 3–2–0; road: 3–3–0)

Game	Date	Visitor	Score	Home	OT	Decision	Attendance	Arena	Record	Pts
28	February 2	Ottawa	0–1	Canadiens		Connell	N/A	Montreal Forum	6–11–11	23
29	February 7	Rangers	1–2	Ottawa		Connell	N/A	Ottawa Auditorium	7–11–11	25
30	February 9	Detroit	2–0	Ottawa		Connell	N/A	Detroit Olympia	7–12–11	25
31	February 12	Maroons	1–2	Ottawa		Connell	N/A	Ottawa Auditorium	8–12–11	27
32	February 14	Ottawa	0–4	Maroons		Connell	N/A	Montreal Forum	8–13–11	27
33	February 16	Ottawa	2–1	Pittsburgh	OT	Connell	N/A	Duquesne Garden	9–13–11	29
34	February 19	Ottawa	2–1	Detroit		Connell	N/A	Detroit Olympia	10–13–11	31
35	February 21	Ottawa	3–0	Chicago		Connell	N/A	Detroit Olympia	11–13–11	33
36	February 23	Pittsburgh	0–3	Ottawa		Connell	N/A	Ottawa Auditorium	12–13–11	35
37	February 26	Ottawa	0–2	Rangers		Connell	N/A	Madison Square Garden	12–14–11	35
38	February 28	Boston	4–0	Ottawa		Connell	N/A	Ottawa Auditorium	12–15–11	35

March: 2–2–2 (home: 1–0–1; road: 1–2–1)

Game	Date	Visitor	Score	Home	OT	Decision	Attendance	Arena	Record	Pts
39	March 2	Ottawa	1–1	Toronto	OT	Connell	N/A	Mutual Street Arena	12–15–12	36
40	March 5	Americans	1–1	Ottawa	OT	Connell	N/A	Ottawa Auditorium	12–15–13	37
41	March 7	Ottawa	0–3	Canadiens		Connell	N/A	Montreal Forum	12–16–13	37
42	March 9	Ottawa	2–1	Boston		Connell	N/A	Boston Madison Square Garden	13–16–13	39
43	March 12	Ottawa	1–2	Americans		Connell	N/A	Madison Square Garden	13–17–13	39
44	March 16	Toronto	0–2	Ottawa		Connell	N/A	Ottawa Auditorium	14–17–13	41

Legend: Win (2 points) Loss (0 points) Tie (1 point)

== Transactions ==
The Senators were involved in the following transactions during the 1928–29 season.

=== Trades ===
October 15, 1928	To Ottawa Senators Cash	To New York Americans Punch Broadbent
October 25, 1928	To Ottawa Senators Bill Touhey	To Montreal Maroons Cash
October 25, 1928	To Ottawa Senators Cash	To Boston Bruins Cy Denneny
November 13, 1928	To Ottawa Senators Loan of Fred Elliott	To Montreal Maroons Cash
February 4, 1929	To Ottawa Senators Joe Lamb	To Montreal Maroons Buck Boucher

== Player statistics ==
=== Regular season ===
Scoring

Player	Pos	GP	G	A	Pts	PIM
Frank Finnigan	RW	44	15	4	19	71
King Clancy	D	44	13	2	15	89
Bill Touhey	LW	44	9	3	12	28
Hec Kilrea	LW	38	5	7	12	36
Alex Smith	D	44	1	7	8	96
Len Grosvenor	C/RW	42	3	2	5	16
Frank Nighbor	C	30	1	4	5	22
Georges Boucher	D	29	3	1	4	60
Sam Godin	RW	23	2	1	3	21
Fred Elliott	RW	43	2	0	2	6
Al Shields	D	42	0	1	1	10
Alec Connell	G	44	0	0	0	0
Milt Halliday	LW	16	0	0	0	0
Joe Lamb	RW	6	0	0	0	8

Goaltending

Player	MIN	GP	W	L	T	GA	GAA	SO
Alec Connell	2820	44	14	17	13	67	1.43	7
Team:	2820	44	14	17	13	67	1.43	7

Note:

Pos = Position;GP = Games played; G = Goals; A = Assists; Pts = Points; PIM = Penalty minutes; +/- = Plus/minus; PPG = Power-play goals; SHG = Short-handed goals; GWG = Game-winning goals
Pos = Position;GP = Games played; Min, TOI = Minutes played; W = Wins; L = Losses; T,T/OT = Ties; OTL = Overtime losses; GA = Goals-against; GAA = Goals-against average; SO = Shutouts; SA = Shots against; SV = Shots saved;SV% = Save percentage;

== Sources ==
- Ross, J. Andrew (2015). Joining the Clubs: The Business of the National Hockey League to 1945. Syracuse University Press. ISBN 9780815633839.
- National Hockey League Guide & Record Book 2007
