= 1929 Stanley Cup Final =

1929 ice hockey championship series

	1	2	Total
Boston Bruins	2	2	2
New York Rangers	0	1	0
- Location(s): Boston: Boston Garden (1); New York City: Madison Square Garden (2)
- Format: best-of-three
- Coaches: Boston: Art Ross; New York: Lester Patrick
- Captains: Boston: Lionel Hitchman; New York: Bill Cook
- Dates: March 28–29, 1929
- Hall of Famers: Bruins: Dit Clapper (1947); Cy Denneny (1959); Mickey MacKay (1952); Harry Oliver (1967); Eddie Shore (1947); Tiny Thompson (1959); Cooney Weiland (1971); Rangers: Frank Boucher (1958); Bill Cook (1952); Bun Cook (1995); Ching Johnson (1958); Coaches: Lester Patrick (1947, player); Art Ross (1949, player); Officials: Bobby Hewitson (1963)

The 1929 Stanley Cup Final was played by the defending champion New York Rangers and the Boston Bruins. This was the first time in Stanley Cup Final history that two American-based teams met in the Finals. Boston won the series to win its first championship.

== Paths to the Finals ==
The playoffs were now between division finishers of each division, rather than a division champion from each division. The Boston Bruins knocked off the Montreal Canadiens, the New York Rangers beat the New York Americans, and the Toronto Maple Leafs beat the Detroit Cougars. The Rangers beat Toronto and then the Bruins won their first Stanley Cup defeating the Rangers. In the process, Boston became one of the few Cup winners in history to not lose a single game in the playoffs, and the last team until 1952 to win every playoff game they had.

This was the third meeting between teams from Boston and New York City for a major professional sports championship. This previously occurred in two World Series (1912, 1916).

== Game summaries ==
The Final was a best-of-three series.

Goalie Cecil "Tiny" Thompson backstopped the Bruins to consecutive wins and posted the third Stanley Cup shutout for a rookie. Game two was played at Madison Square Garden.

Thompson faced his brother Paul Thompson, a forward with the Rangers, in the Finals. It marked the first time a set of brothers faced each other in a goaltender-forward combination in Stanley Cup Final history. Tiny said of the matchup: "When I played goal for Boston against Paul (in) the final of 1929, he was just a rookie. It was really no contest."

March 28	New York Rangers	0–2	Boston Bruins	Boston Madison Square Garden	Recap
No scoring		First period	No scoring
No scoring		Second period	2:00 - Dit Clapper (1); 10:00 - Dutch Gainor (2)
No scoring		Third period	No scoring
John Ross Roach		Goalie stats	Tiny Thompson

March 29	Boston Bruins	2–1	New York Rangers	Madison Square Garden III	Recap
No scoring		First period	No scoring
Harry Oliver (1) - 14:01		Second period	No scoring
Bill Carson (2) - 18:02		Third period	6:48 - Butch Keeling (3)
Tiny Thompson		Goalie stats	John Ross Roach

Boston won series 2–0

== Stanley Cup engraving ==
The 1929 Stanley Cup was presented to Bruins captain Lionel Hitchman by NHL President Frank Calder following the Bruins 2–1 win over the Rangers in game two.

The following Bruins players and staff had their names engraved on the Stanley Cup

1928–29 Boston Bruins

=== Players ===
Centres

- 7 Redvers "Red" Green
- 8 Norman Dutch Gainor
- 10 Eddie Rodden
- 14 Ralph Cooney Weiland
- 15 Bill "Doc" Carson

Wingers

- 5 Duncan Mickey MacKay
- 6 Percy Galbraith
- 15/7 Lloyd Klein
- 9 Harry Oliver
- 12 Aubrey Dit Clapper
- 16 Cy Denneny (playing-Asst Coach)

Defencemen

- 2 Eddie Shore
- 3 Lionel Hitchman (Captain)
- 4 Myles Lane
- 17/11 George Owen

Goaltenders

- 1 Cecil Tiny Thompson

=== Coaching and administrative staff ===
- Charlie Adams(President/Owner),
- Art Ross (Manager-Coach)
- Win Green (Trainer)
- Ralph Burkard (Treasurer)†, Frank Ryan* (Publicity Director)

* Name is listed on the team picture, but not engraved on the Stanley Cup in 1929.

=== Stanley Cup engraving ===
- When the Boston Bruins won the Stanley Cup in 1928–29, they decided to use the rest of the ring that the 1926–27 Ottawa Senators had put on the cup. There was not enough room to include all the official winning members. They had to leave off Red Green, Eddie Rodden, and Lloyd Klein. When the cup was redone during the 1957–58 season, Green, Rodden, and Klein were added to the cup.
- Also included in 1957-58.
- #1 Hal Winkler (who spent the whole season in the minors),
- #4 Eric Pettinger(LW-traded to Toronto for George Owen),
- 11 Frank Fredrickson(C-traded to Pittsburgh Pirates for Mickey Mackay)

Under NHL rules, none of the players qualified since they were part of another team when cup was won.

- By mistake, Charles Adams (President/Owner) and George Owen (player) were left off the cup 2nd version, even though there was more than enough room to include them.
- From 1958 to 1993, the 1928–29 Boston Bruins were on the Stanley Cup in 2 different places. Once beside 1926–27 Ottawa, and others on the first larger ring with winners from 1927–28 to 1939–40.
- Cy Denneny's name was engraved twice on the larger ring, once as Cy Denneny Coach, and another time as C Denneny with the other players.
- Rumour has it that the original ring of the 1928-29 Boston was melted down to make a trophy for Hector "Toe" Blake when he retired after winning his 8th Stanley Cup was Coach with Montreal (11th cup overall)

== See also ==
- 1928–29 NHL season

== References & notes ==
- NHL (2000). Total Stanley Cup. Dan Diamond & Associates.
- Podnieks, Andrew; Hockey Hall of Fame (2004). Lord Stanley's Cup. Triumph Books. ISBN 978-1-55168-261-7.

Preceded by New York Rangers; 1928	Boston Bruins; Stanley Cup champions 1929	Succeeded by Montreal Canadiens; 1930
