= 1928–29 Pittsburgh Pirates (NHL) season =

National Hockey League team season

1928–29 Pittsburgh Pirates
- Division: 4th American
- 1928–29 record: 9–27–8
- Home record: 5–13–4
- Road record: 4–14–4
- Goals for: 46
- Goals against: 80

Team information
- Coach: Odie Cleghorn
- Captain: Harold Cotton
- Arena: Duquesne Garden

Team leaders
- Goals: Harold Darragh (9); Hib Milks (9)
- Assists: Frank Fredrickson (7)
- Points: Harold Darragh (12); Hib Milks (12)
- Penalty minutes: Rodger Smith (49)
- Wins: Joe Miller (9)
- Goals against average: Joe Miller (1.73)

The 1928–29 Pittsburgh Pirates season was the fourth season of the Pirates ice hockey team in the National Hockey League (NHL).

== Regular season ==
=== Final standings ===
American Division
	GP	W	L	T	GF	GA	PIM	Pts
**Boston Bruins**	44	26	13	5	89	52	472	57
**New York Rangers**	44	21	13	10	72	65	384	52
**Detroit Cougars**	44	19	16	9	72	63	381	47
Pittsburgh Pirates	44	9	27	8	46	80	324	26
Chicago Black Hawks	44	7	29	8	33	85	363	22

Note: GP = Games Played, W = Wins, L = Losses, T = Ties, Pts = Points, GF = Goals For, GA = Goals Against
Teams that qualified for the playoffs are highlighted in bold.

=== Record vs. opponents ===
==== Vs. American Division ====
1928–29 NHL records
Team	**BOS**	**CHI**	**DET**	**NYR**	**PIT**	**Total**
Boston	—	4–1–1	4–1–1	5–1	5–1	**18–4–2**
Chicago	1–4–1	—	1–4–1	0–4–2	2–3–1	**4–15–5**
Detroit	1–4–1	4–1–1	—	1–4–1	5–1	**11–10–3**
N.Y. Rangers	1–5	4–0–2	4–1–1	—	4–0–2	**13–6–5**
Pittsburgh	1–5	3–2–1	1–5	0–4–2	—	**5–16–3**

==== Vs. Canadian Division ====
1928–29 NHL records
Team	**MTL**	**MTM**	**NYA**	**OTT**	**TOR**	**Total**
Boston	1–2–1	3–1	0–3–1	2–1–1	2–2	**8–9–3**
Chicago	0–4	1–2–1	1–3	1–2–1	0–3–1	**3–14–3**
Detroit	1–1–2	2–1–1	2–1–1	1–1–2	2–2	**8–6–6**
N.Y. Rangers	1–1–2	0–3–1	1–1–2	3–1	3–1	**8–7–5**
Pittsburgh	0–2–2	1–2–1	2–2	0–3–1	1–2–1	**4–11–5**

== Schedule and results ==
1928–29 regular season
November

Game	Result	Date	Score	Opponent	Record
1	L	November 15, 1928	0–1 OT	Boston Bruins (1928–29)	0–1–0
2	L	November 18, 1928	1–3	@ Detroit Cougars (1928–29)	0–2–0
3	W	November 20, 1928	2–0	@ Chicago Black Hawks (1928–29)	1–2–0
4	T	November 22, 1928	0–0 OT	Montreal Canadiens (1928–29)	1–2–1
5	L	November 25, 1928	0–2	@ New York Rangers (1928–29)	1–3–1
6	L	November 27, 1928	0–1	@ Boston Bruins (1928–29)	1–4–1
7	T	November 29, 1928	1–1 OT	@ Montreal Canadiens (1928–29)	1–4–2

December

Game	Result	Date	Score	Opponent	Record
8	L	December 1, 1928	2–3	Chicago Black Hawks (1928–29)	1–5–2
9	T	December 6, 1928	0–0 OT	New York Rangers (1928–29)	1–5–3
10	L	December 8, 1928	0–3	Detroit Cougars (1928–29)	1–6–3
11	T	December 15, 1928	0–0 OT	@ Ottawa Senators (1928–29)	1–6–4
12	L	December 18, 1928	0–2	@ New York Americans (1928–29)	1–7–4
13	W	December 20, 1928	1–0	New York Americans (1928–29)	2–7–4
14	W	December 22, 1928	3–2	@ Toronto Maple Leafs (1928–29)	3–7–4
15	L	December 27, 1928	0–2	Toronto Maple Leafs (1928–29)	3–8–4
16	W	December 29, 1928	3–2	@ Montreal Maroons (1928–29)	4–8–4

January

Game	Result	Date	Score	Opponent	Record
17	L	January 1, 1929	2–4	Montreal Maroons (1928–29)	4–9–4
18	T	January 3, 1929	2–2 OT	@ New York Rangers (1928–29)	4–9–5
19	L	January 5, 1929	2–3	@ Boston Bruins (1928–29)	4–10–5
20	W	January 8, 1929	1–0 OT	Chicago Black Hawks (1928–29)	5–10–5
21	L	January 10, 1929	1–4	@ Detroit Cougars (1928–29)	5–11–5
22	L	January 12, 1929	1–2	Ottawa Senators (1928–29)	5–12–5
23	T	January 13, 1929	1–1 OT	@ Chicago Black Hawks (1928–29)	5–12–6
24	W	January 19, 1929	3–0	Detroit Cougars (1928–29)	6–12–6
25	W	January 20, 1929	2–0	@ New York Americans (1928–29)	7–12–6
26	L	January 24, 1929	1–3	New York Rangers (1928–29)	7–13–6
27	L	January 26, 1929	0–2	@ Montreal Maroons (1928–29)	7–14–6

February

Game	Result	Date	Score	Opponent	Record
28	T	February 2, 1929	0–0 OT	Montreal Maroons (1928–29)	7–14–7
29	T	February 5, 1929	0–0 OT	Toronto Maple Leafs (1928–29)	7–14–8
30	L	February 9, 1929	1–2	@ Toronto Maple Leafs (1928–29)	7–15–8
31	L	February 10, 1929	0–3	@ Detroit Cougars (1928–29)	7–16–8
32	L	February 12, 1929	0–2	Montreal Canadiens (1928–29)	7–17–8
33	W	February 14, 1929	2–0	Boston Bruins (1928–29)	8–17–8
34	L	February 16, 1929	1–2 OT	Ottawa Senators (1928–29)	8–18–8
35	L	February 17, 1929	1–2	@ New York Rangers (1928–29)	8–19–8
36	L	February 19, 1929	0–1	@ Boston Bruins (1928–29)	8–20–8
37	L	February 21, 1929	2–4	New York Americans (1928–29)	8–21–8
38	L	February 23, 1929	0–3	@ Ottawa Senators (1928–29)	8–22–8
39	L	February 26, 1929	0–4	@ Montreal Canadiens (1928–29)	8–23–8

March

Game	Result	Date	Score	Opponent	Record
40	L	March 2, 1929	3–4 OT	Detroit Cougars (1928–29)	8–24–8
41	W	March 5, 1929	3–2 OT	Chicago Black Hawks (1928–29)	9–24–8
42	L	March 10, 1929	0–1	@ Chicago Black Hawks (1928–29)	9–25–8
43	L	March 16, 1929	1–3	Boston Bruins (1928–29)	9–26–8
44	L	March 17, 1929	3–4	New York Rangers (1928–29)	9–27–8

Legend: Win (2 points) Loss (0 points) Tie (1 point)

== Player statistics ==
=== Regular season ===
Scoring

Player	Pos	GP	G	A	Pts	PIM
Harold Darragh	LW	43	9	3	12	6
Hib Milks	LW/C	44	9	3	12	22
Frank Fredrickson	C	31	3	7	10	28
Herb Drury	D/RW	43	5	4	9	49
Tex White	RW	30	3	4	7	18
Rodger Smith	D	44	4	2	6	49
Baldy Cotton	LW	32	3	2	5	38
Albert Holway	D	40	4	0	4	20
Gerry Lowrey	LW	12	2	1	3	6
Mickey MacKay	C	10	1	0	1	2
Bert McCaffrey	RW/D	42	1	0	1	34
Johnny McKinnon	D	39	1	0	1	44
Duke McCurry	LW	35	0	1	1	4
Edmond Bouchard	LW/D	12	0	0	0	2
Joe Miller	G	44	0	0	0	0
Jesse Spring	D	5	0	0	0	2

Goaltending

Player	MIN	GP	W	L	T	GA	GAA	SO
Joe Miller	2780	44	9	27	8	80	1.73	11
Team:	2780	44	9	27	8	80	1.73	11

Note: GP = Games played; G = Goals; A = Assists; Pts = Points; +/- = Plus/minus; PIM = Penalty minutes; PPG=Power-play goals; SHG=Short-handed goals; GWG=Game-winning goals
MIN=Minutes played; W = Wins; L = Losses; T = Ties; GA = Goals against; GAA = Goals against average; SO = Shutouts;

== See also ==
- 1928–29 NHL season
