= 1928–29 Detroit Cougars season =

Sports season

1928–29 Detroit Cougars
- Division: 3rd American
- 1928–29 record: 19–16–9
- Home record: 11–6–5
- Road record: 8–10–4
- Goals for: 72
- Goals against: 63

Team information
- General manager: Jack Adams
- Coach: Jack Adams
- Captain: Reg Noble
- Arena: Detroit Olympia

Team leaders
- Goals: Carson Cooper (18)
- Assists: Carson Cooper (9)
- Points: Carson Cooper (27)
- Penalty minutes: Bill Brydge (67)
- Wins: Dolly Dolson (19)
- Goals against average: Dolly Dolson (1.37)

The 1928–29 Detroit Cougars season was the third season of play for the Detroit National Hockey League franchise. The Cougars placed third in the American Division to advance to the playoffs for the first time. The Cougars lost in the first round to the Toronto Maple Leafs.

== Offseason ==
After the 1927–28 season, the Cougars traded the rights to Jack Arbour and $12,500 to the Toronto Maple Leafs for Jimmy "Sailor" Herbert.

== Regular season ==
=== Final standings ===
American Division
	GP	W	L	T	GF	GA	PIM	Pts
**Boston Bruins**	44	26	13	5	89	52	472	57
**New York Rangers**	44	21	13	10	72	65	384	52
**Detroit Cougars**	44	19	16	9	72	63	381	47
Pittsburgh Pirates	44	9	27	8	46	80	324	26
Chicago Black Hawks	44	7	29	8	33	85	363	22

Note: GP = Games Played, W = Wins, L = Losses, T = Ties, Pts = Points, GF = Goals For, GA = Goals Against
Teams that qualified for the playoffs are highlighted in bold.

=== Record vs. opponents ===
==== Vs. American Division ====
1928–29 NHL records
Team	**BOS**	**CHI**	**DET**	**NYR**	**PIT**	**Total**
Boston	—	4–1–1	4–1–1	5–1	5–1	**18–4–2**
Chicago	1–4–1	—	1–4–1	0–4–2	2–3–1	**4–15–5**
Detroit	1–4–1	4–1–1	—	1–4–1	5–1	**11–10–3**
N.Y. Rangers	1–5	4–0–2	4–1–1	—	4–0–2	**13–6–5**
Pittsburgh	1–5	3–2–1	1–5	0–4–2	—	**5–16–3**

==== Vs. Canadian Division ====
1928–29 NHL records
Team	**MTL**	**MTM**	**NYA**	**OTT**	**TOR**	**Total**
Boston	1–2–1	3–1	0–3–1	2–1–1	2–2	**8–9–3**
Chicago	0–4	1–2–1	1–3	1–2–1	0–3–1	**3–14–3**
Detroit	1–1–2	2–1–1	2–1–1	1–1–2	2–2	**8–6–6**
N.Y. Rangers	1–1–2	0–3–1	1–1–2	3–1	3–1	**8–7–5**
Pittsburgh	0–2–2	1–2–1	2–2	0–3–1	1–2–1	**4–11–5**

== Schedule and results ==
1928–29 regular season
November

Game	Result	Date	Score	Opponent	Record
1	L	November 15, 1928	0–2	New York Rangers (1928–29)	0–1–0
2	W	November 18, 1928	3–1	Pittsburgh Pirates (1928–29)	1–1–0
3	W	November 22, 1928	2–0	Boston Bruins (1928–29)	2–1–0
4	T	November 24, 1928	1–1 OT	@ Ottawa Senators (1928–29)	2–1–1
5	T	November 29, 1928	1–1 OT	Montreal Maroons (1928–29)	2–1–2

December

Game	Result	Date	Score	Opponent	Record
6	W	December 2, 1928	2–1	New York Americans (1928–29)	3–1–2
7	W	December 8, 1928	3–0	@ Pittsburgh Pirates (1928–29)	4–1–2
8	T	December 9, 1928	2–2 OT	New York Rangers (1928–29)	4–1–3
9	L	December 11, 1928	1–2	@ Montreal Maroons (1928–29)	4–2–3
10	T	December 13, 1928	1–1 OT	Ottawa Senators (1928–29)	4–2–4
11	L	December 16, 1928	0–3	@ New York Rangers (1928–29)	4–3–4
12	L	December 18, 1928	1–3	@ Boston Bruins (1928–29)	4–4–4
13	W	December 20, 1928	5–1	Montreal Canadiens (1928–29)	5–4–4
14	W	December 23, 1928	2–0	@ New York Americans (1928–29)	6–4–4
15	L	December 27, 1928	0–3	@ Montreal Canadiens (1928–29)	6–5–4
16	L	December 29, 1928	3–4	@ Toronto Maple Leafs (1928–29)	6–6–4
17	W	December 30, 1928	3–1	Chicago Black Hawks (1928–29)	7–6–4

January

Game	Result	Date	Score	Opponent	Record
18	W	January 1, 1929	2–1	@ Chicago Black Hawks (1928–29)	8–6–4
19	W	January 6, 1929	3–1	@ Chicago Black Hawks (1928–29)	9–6–4
20	W	January 10, 1929	4–1	Pittsburgh Pirates (1928–29)	10–6–4
21	L	January 12, 1929	2–3	@ Boston Bruins (1928–29)	10–7–4
22	L	January 13, 1929	0–1	@ New York Rangers (1928–29)	10–8–4
23	T	January 17, 1929	1–1 OT	Boston Bruins (1928–29)	10–8–5
24	L	January 19, 1929	0–3	@ Pittsburgh Pirates (1928–29)	10–9–5
25	W	January 20, 1929	2–1	Toronto Maple Leafs (1928–29)	11–9–5
26	W	January 22, 1929	1–0 OT	@ Montreal Maroons (1928–29)	12–9–5
27	L	January 27, 1929	1–2	New York Americans (1928–29)	12–10–5

February

Game	Result	Date	Score	Opponent	Record
28	L	February 5, 1929	0–1	Chicago Black Hawks (1928–29)	12–11–5
29	T	February 7, 1929	2–2 OT	@ Montreal Canadiens (1928–29)	12–11–6
30	W	February 9, 1929	2–0	@ Ottawa Senators (1928–29)	13–11–6
31	W	February 10, 1929	3–0	Pittsburgh Pirates (1928–29)	14–11–6
32	L	February 12, 1929	0–1	@ Boston Bruins (1928–29)	14–12–6
33	T	February 14, 1929	1–1 OT	@ New York Americans (1928–29)	14–12–7
34	W	February 17, 1929	2–0	Toronto Maple Leafs (1928–29)	15–12–7
35	L	February 19, 1929	1–2	Ottawa Senators (1928–29)	15–13–7
36	W	February 21, 1929	1–0	@ New York Rangers (1928–29)	16–13–7
37	T	February 24, 1929	0–0 OT	@ Chicago Black Hawks (1928–29)	16–13–8
38	W	February 26, 1929	3–0	Chicago Black Hawks (1928–29)	17–13–8

March

Game	Result	Date	Score	Opponent	Record
39	W	March 2, 1929	4–3 OT	@ Pittsburgh Pirates (1928–29)	18–13–8
40	L	March 3, 1929	2–3	New York Rangers (1928–29)	18–14–8
41	W	March 5, 1929	3–1	Montreal Maroons (1928–29)	19–14–8
42	L	March 9, 1929	0–3	@ Toronto Maple Leafs (1928–29)	19–15–8
43	T	March 10, 1929	1–1 OT	Montreal Canadiens (1928–29)	19–15–9
44	L	March 14, 1929	1–5	Boston Bruins (1928–29)	19–16–9

Legend: Win (2 points) Loss (0 points) Tie (1 point)

== Playoffs ==
=== (C3) Toronto Maple Leafs vs. (A3) Detroit Cougars ===
Detroit Cougars vs Toronto Maple Leafs
Date	Visitors	Score	Home	Score
Mar 19	Toronto	3	Detroit	1
Mar 21	Detroit	1	Toronto	4

Toronto wins a total goal series 7 goals to 2.

== Player statistics ==
=== Regular season ===
Scoring

Player	Pos	GP	G	A	Pts	PIM
Carson Cooper	RW	43	18	9	27	14
George Hay	LW	39	11	8	19	14
Bob Connors	LW/D	41	13	3	16	68
Jimmy Herbert	C/RW	40	9	5	14	34
Herbie Lewis	LW	36	9	5	14	33
Reg Noble	C/D	43	6	4	10	52
Bernie Brophy	LW	37	2	4	6	23
Bill Brydge	D	31	2	2	4	59
Larry Aurie	RW	35	1	1	2	26
Pete Bellefeuille	RW	1	1	0	1	0
Frank Daley	LW/C	5	0	0	0	0
Dolly Dolson	G	44	0	0	0	0
Gord Fraser	D	14	0	0	0	12
Farrand Gillie	LW/D	1	0	0	0	0
Red Green	LW	2	0	0	0	0
Percy Traub	D	44	0	0	0	46

Goaltending

Player	MIN	GP	W	L	T	GA	GAA	SO
Dolly Dolson	2750	44	19	16	9	63	1.37	10
Team:	2750	44	19	16	9	63	1.37	10

=== Playoffs ===
Scoring

Player	Pos	GP	G	A	Pts	PIM
Larry Aurie	RW	2	1	0	1	2
George Hay	LW	2	1	0	1	0
Bernie Brophy	LW	2	0	0	0	2
Bill Brydge	D	2	0	0	0	4
Bob Connors	LW/D	2	0	0	0	10
Carson Cooper	RW	2	0	0	0	2
Frank Daley	LW/C	2	0	0	0	0
Dolly Dolson	G	2	0	0	0	0
Jimmy Herbert	C/RW	1	0	0	0	2
Reg Noble	C/D	2	0	0	0	2
Percy Traub	D	2	0	0	0	0

Goaltending

Player	MIN	GP	W	L	GA	GAA	SO
Dolly Dolson	120	2	0	2	7	3.50	0
Team:	120	2	0	2	7	3.50	0

Note: GP = Games played; G = Goals; A = Assists; Pts = Points; PIM = Penalty minutes; PPG = Power-play goals; SHG = Short-handed goals; GWG = Game-winning goals
MIN = Minutes played; W = Wins; L = Losses; T = Ties; GA = Goals against; GAA = Goals against average; SO = Shutouts;

== See also ==
- 1928–29 NHL season
