= Lionel Hitchman =

Canadian ice hockey player (1901–1969)

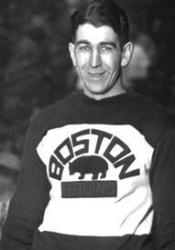
- Born: November 3, 1901 Toronto, Ontario, Canada
- Died: December 5, 1968 (aged 67) Glens Falls, New York, U.S.
- Height: 6 ft 1 in (185 cm)
- Weight: 167 lb (76 kg; 11 st 13 lb)
- Position: Defence
- Shot: Right
- Played for: Ottawa Senators; Boston Bruins
- Playing career: 1922–1934

Frederick Lionel Hitchman (November 3, 1901 – December 5, 1968) was a Canadian professional ice hockey defenceman who played twelve seasons in the National Hockey League for the Ottawa Senators and Boston Bruins.

He is viewed as one of the best defensemen of his era. Forming one of the greatest defensive pairings of all time with superstar Eddie Shore, Hitchman's #3 jersey was retired by the Boston Bruins on February 22, 1934, the second time in North American professional sports history that a player's number was officially retired, with the Toronto Maple Leafs retiring #6 for Ace Bailey eight days earlier, on February 14, 1934.

== Amateur career ==
The son of Edward F. Hitchman, a noted cricket authority and journalist, Hitchman was born in Toronto, although his family moved to Ottawa when he 21. Growing up he was a avid outdoorsman and excelled in many sports such as baseball, lacrosse and would even lead his high school Oakwood Collegiate to a pair of city championships in 1917 and 1919 in the sport of rugby. He played his junior hockey with the Toronto Aura Lee club of the Ontario Hockey Association, appearing sporadically in four games in the 1920 season and three the following year.

Subsequently, serving in the Royal Canadian Mounted Police, he had shown enough to be invited to join the Ottawa New Edinburghs of the senior Ottawa City Hockey League, for whom he played in 24 games over the 1922 and 1923 seasons. Scoring seven goals, Hitchman gained greater notoriety as a hardrock defenceman, amassing 52 penalty minutes, and was named to the league All-Star Team both seasons. He also saw action with the RCMP team in the Civil Service League.

== Ottawa Senators ==
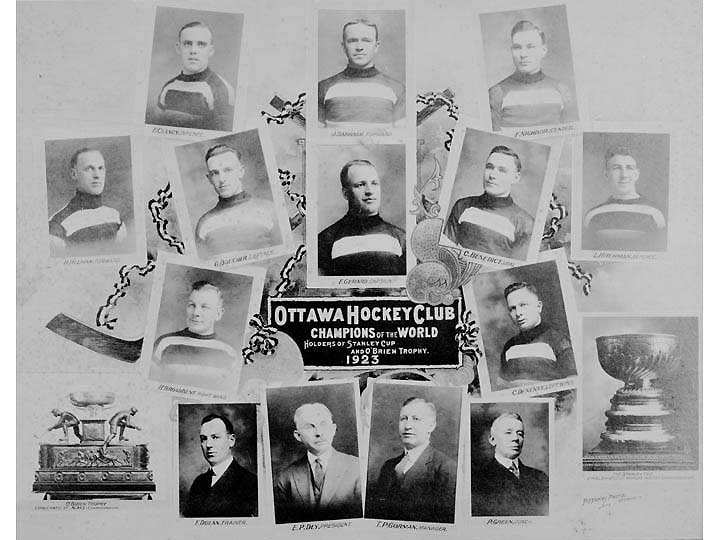
1923 Stanley Cup Champion Ottawa Senators; Hitchman is at the far right

After the end of the New Edinburghs' playoffs that season, Hitchman was signed by the Senators in 1923, first appearing in a victory against the Hamilton Tigers on February 28. His first playoff game for the Senators was tumultuous, a match against the Montreal Canadiens on March 7 in which future teammate Sprague Cleghorn - with whom he had been sparring all evening - crosschecked Hitchman in the face, knocking him out. Cleghorn received a match penalty for the act, which provoked a near-riot from the home crowd and an assault on the referee. While too injured to play in the first Stanley Cup semifinal match against the Vancouver Maroons of the Pacific Coast Hockey Association, he played in the three remaining matches. In the best-of-three final against the Edmonton Eskimos of the Western Canada Hockey League, Hitchman starred in a decimated Senators' defence, scoring the tying goal which sent the first game into overtime, won by the Senators en route to their tenth Cup victory.

With the retirement of star defenceman Eddie Gerard, Hitchman became a regular for the Senators thereafter, a starter on the 1924 regular season champion team. Hitchman scored his 1st NHL goal on January 23, 1924 at 4:30 of the 3rd period vs John Ross Roach of the Toronto St. Pats. The Senators won 5-1

The following season, with the Senators in a losing streak - and Hitchman thought to be expendable due to the play of long-time amateur and newcomer Ed Gorman - he requested a trade to the expansion Boston Bruins in January 1925. He was subsequently loaned to the Bruins for the remainder of the season, subject to him coming to contract terms with the club.

== Boston Bruins ==
His first season for the floundering Boston team not otherwise notable, due to being traded mid-season to a team which had played fewer games than the Senators, Hitchman set the NHL record for games played in a single season with 31, in a season scheduled for 30 games.

Hitchman scored his first goal as a Boston Bruin on January 12, 1925, in Boston's 4–2 loss to Hamilton.

Matters improved in the 1926 season with the acquisition of Doc Stewart in goal and Hitchman's old nemesis Sprague Cleghorn, with whom he was teamed on defense. The Bruins finished the season with a 13-3-1 run, missing by a single point overtaking the Pittsburgh Pirates for a playoff berth. Hitchman finished third in team scoring, logging seven goals and eleven points, his career high in both categories. Under Cleghorn's veteran tutelage, Hitchman adopted a much scrappier style - if without Cleghorn's habitual dirty play - and his penalty minutes more than tripled.

The 1927 season, with the dissolution of the Western Hockey League, saw ex-Edmonton superstar Eddie Shore sign with the Bruins. Shore replaced the fading Cleghorn as Hitchman's defence partner, and was quickly recognized as the league's preeminent defence pairing. The two would team up for the rest of Hitchman's career, with Shore's rushing style paired with Hitchman's stay-at-home play. The Bruins fell to the Senators in the 1927 Stanley Cup Final, the series was marked full of rough play - in the final game, Hitchman and George Boucher were involved in a wild fight. With Ottawa police jumping onto the ice to help the referees and Hitchman and Boucher were ejected. However Hitchman's play was sufficient to receive a $1,400 bonus from the team, the second highest awarded.

Cleghorn retired after the 1928 season, and Hitchman was named to replace him as team captain. His first year as captain was highly successful, as he led a defence that was virtually impenetrable leading the team to its first Stanley Cup championship, with the Bruins defeating the New York Rangers in the finals two games to none. During the Bruins' victory banquet, manager Art Ross praised Hitchman heavily, calling him "a cornerstone of the franchise." His toughness was proven the following campaign when, in a March 1, 1930, game against Ottawa, his jaw was broken by a Shore clearing pass; he stayed in the match, playing the rest of the game without relief. He would become one of the first hockey players to wear a helmet, donning a leather helmet designed by Bruins' coach Art Ross to protect the jaw after sitting out for two weeks to recover. The helmet was credited with saving Hitchman from serious injury when he was slashed in the head by Montreal Maroons forward Hooley Smith in a subsequent match.

Hitchman resigned the captaincy in George Owen's favor in 1932, but remained well-regarded enough as a leader to substitute for Ross as player-coach when Ross took ill in January 1933. Hitchman's interim stint was marred by a January 24 match against the Canadiens which included stick battles and the referee being knocked unconscious. The match provoked a league investigation and a furor played out in the press, ultimately leading to the resignation of Bruins' owner Charles Adams as a league governor.

This was the last season in which Hitchman served as Shore's defence partner. The 1934 season proved his last, and slowed by injuries, he retired mid-season. His last match was February 22 against Hitchman's old Senators team, after which the Bruins announced that his #3 jersey would be permanently retired, the second professional sports team to do so, after the Maple Leafs retired Ace Bailey's #6. After the game Hintchman was given two checks of $500—one from team management, the other from fans—and a variety of gifts, the defenseman’s stick and jersey presented to his parents who had travelled from Ottawa for the occasion. He played a handful of games at the end of the 1934 season for the minor league Boston Cubs, after which he hung up his skates for good.

Columnist Walter Graham wrote of Springfield Daily News once described Hitchman’s play stating "a master of the sweep and poke checks, the possessor of a terrific body check and a boundless supply of courage, Hitchman, in his prime, was as fine a defenseman as there was in the business."

== Retirement ==
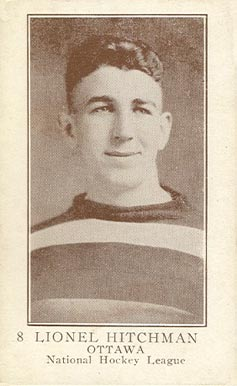
Hitchman with the Ottawa Senators

Hitchman retired with 28 goals and 34 assists in 417 career NHL games, adding 534 penalty minutes. Although often overlooked by contemporaries in favor of defencemen with gaudier offensive numbers, Hitchman was regarded as the premier defensive defencemen of his day.

Despite reports that he would succeed Ross as Bruins' coach and would not be asked to serve in the minor leagues, Hitchman went on to coach the Bruins' Boston Cubs farm team for two seasons coaching the team to a Canadian–American Hockey League championship in 1935; the Cubs folded thereafter, and he was named Ross' assistant coach for the Bruins the following year.

Hitchman went on to coach the Springfield Indians in 1939, although he missed half the season with a leg injury that kept him off the bench.

After retirement from hockey, he continued to serve with the Royal Canadian Mounted Police as a sergeant, a post he had been filling in the off-season throughout his hockey career. Hitchman was also an avid fisherman, at one point setting a size record for salmon fishing. His daughter Gloria starred with the Ice Capades.

In retirement, Hitchman resided in Indian Lake, New York. He died in Glens Falls, New York, on December 5, 1968. Hitchman’s death originally went unreported for a few weeks by multiple media outlets. His friend and former teammate Eddie Shore commented on his death stating "That's the only way Hitch would have it," "He was one of the quietest fellows in the world, never sought recognition. "As a hockey player, he did his job well and never wanted any acclaim. And that’s undoubtedly the way he wanted it in death. He just couldn’t stand to have anybody fussing over him."

In 2019 author Pam Coburn released a book on Hitchman’s life and career titled Hitch, Hockey's Unsung Hero: The Story of Boston Bruin Lionel Hitchman.

He was honored during the Boston Bruins centennial celebrations in 2024.

== Awards, honors and achievements ==
- 2x Stanley Cup champion — 1923 (Ottawa Senators (original)), 1929 (Boston Bruins)
- His #3 jersey number is retired by the Boston Bruins.
- Named One of the Top 100 Best Bruins Players of all Time.
- Canadian–American Hockey League Champion — 1935 (As a coach)

== Career statistics ==
=== Regular season and playoffs ===
- **Bold** indicates led league

			Regular season					Playoffs
Season	Team	League	GP	G	A	Pts	PIM	GP	G	A	Pts	PIM
1919–20	Toronto Aura Lee	OHA-Jr.	4	0	0	0	0	—	—	—	—	—
1920–21	Toronto Aura Lee	OHA-Jr.	3	1	0	1	4	—	—	—	—	—
1921–22	Ottawa New Edinburghs	OCHL	8	2	1	3	14	—	—	—	—	—
1922–23	Ottawa Edinburghs	OCHL	16	5	1	6	30	—	—	—	—	—
1922–23	Ottawa Senators	NHL	3	0	1	1	12	7	1	0	1	4
1922–23	Ottawa Senators	St-Cup	—	—	—	—	—	5	1	0	1	4
1923–24	Ottawa Senators	NHL	24	2	**10**	12	32	2	0	0	0	4
1924–25	Ottawa Senators	NHL	12	0	0	0	2	—	—	—	—	—
1924–25	Boston Bruins	NHL	18	3	1	4	28	—	—	—	—	—
1925–26	Boston Bruins	NHL	36	7	4	11	82	—	—	—	—	—
1926–27	Boston Bruins	NHL	42	3	6	9	72	8	1	0	1	26
1927–28	Boston Bruins	NHL	44	5	3	8	87	2	0	0	0	2
1928–29	Boston Bruins	NHL	38	1	0	1	64	5	0	1	1	22
1929–30	Boston Bruins	NHL	39	2	7	9	58	6	1	0	1	14
1930–31	Boston Bruins	NHL	41	0	2	2	46	5	0	0	0	0
1931–32	Boston Bruins	NHL	48	3	3	6	36	—	—	—	—	—
1932–33	Boston Bruins	NHL	45	0	1	1	34	5	0	0	0	0
1933–34	Boston Bruins	NHL	27	1	0	1	4	—	—	—	—	—
1933–34	Boston Cubs	Can-Am	4	0	0	0	2	—	—	—	—	—
NHL totals			417	27	38	65	557	40	3	1	4	72

Preceded by Sprague Cleghorn	Boston Bruins captain 1928–31	Succeeded by George Owen
