= 1928–29 Boston Bruins season =

NHL team season

1928–29 Boston Bruins
- Stanley Cup champions
- American Division champions
- Division: 1st American
- 1928–29 record: 26–13–5
- Home record: 15–6–1
- Road record: 11–7–4
- Goals for: 89 (1st)
- Goals against: 52 (2nd)

Team information
- General manager: Art Ross
- Coach: Cy Denneny
- Captain: Lionel Hitchman
- Arena: Boston Madison Square Garden
- Average attendance: 13387

Team leaders
- Goals: Harry Oliver (17)
- Assists: Eddie Shore and Cooney Weiland (7)
- Points: Harry Oliver (23)
- Penalty minutes: Eddie Shore (96)
- Wins: Tiny Thompson (26)
- Goals against average: Tiny Thompson (1.15)

The 1928–29 Boston Bruins season was the Bruins' fifth season in the NHL. Boston defended its American Division title, and went on to defeat the New York Rangers in the Final to become the third American-based team to become Stanley Cup champions.

== Offseason ==
In the off-season, the Bruins acquired Cy Denneny from the Ottawa Senators, who became a player-coach for the team, taking over from Art Ross, who stepped down to concentrate on his general manager duties. With the retirement of Hal Winkler, the team also had a new goaltender, rookie Tiny Thompson—who had spent the 1927–28 season with the Bruins' farm team, the Minneapolis Millers of the AHA—and a promising new forward, Cooney Weiland, who also had played with Minneapolis. Nobby Clark and the rights to suspended Billy Coutu were sold to New Haven of the Canadian–American League, January 5, 1928.

The team also moved into a new home, the Boston Madison Square Garden. The Garden's much larger capacity than the old Boston Arena saw the Bruins' attendance double, to lead the league by a wide margin.

== Regular season ==
In their debut game at Boston Garden, the Bruins lost 1–0 to the Montreal Canadiens.

Boston got off to a slow start, and through their first 14 games, the Bruins had a record of 5–7–2, tied with the Pittsburgh Pirates. As the season progressed, Boston made a few trades, acquiring star Mickey MacKay from the Pirates and Bill Carson from the Toronto Maple Leafs. Lester Patrick and the New York Rangers offered Winthrop native Myles Lane to the Bruins, astonishingly asking for superstar Eddie Shore in return. Bruins' general manager Art Ross replied famously, "You are so many Myles from Shore you need a life preserver." Nonetheless, the Bruins purchased Lane's rights for $7,500.

Further, Weiland was matched with Dit Clapper and Dutch Gainor on a powerful forward line which garnered the nickname "Dynamite Line", one of the first named forward lines in history. The Bruins rebounded with a 13-game unbeaten streak, which gave them a 16–7–4 record and suddenly in contention with the New York Rangers for top spot in the American Division. Boston had a 10–6–1 record in their remaining 17 games, and held off the Rangers to defend their American Division and the Prince of Wales Trophy, finishing with a 26–13–5 mark and a team record 57 points.

Harry Oliver led Boston in scoring, with 17 goals and 23 points. Dutch Gainor and defenseman Eddie Shore finished just behind Oliver with 19 points, while rookie Cooney Weiland tallied 11 goals and 18 points. Shore led the club with 96 penalty minutes, while team captain Lionel Hitchman finished with 64 penalty minutes.

In goal, Tiny Thompson had an impressive rookie season, winning 26 games while posting a 1.15 goals against average—both Bruins' records, as well as recording 12 shutouts. Thompson's 1.15 GAA remains the Bruins' single-season record and is the second lowest ever recorded over a full season in NHL history.

=== Final standings ===
American Division
	GP	W	L	T	GF	GA	PIM	Pts
**Boston Bruins**	44	26	13	5	89	52	472	57
**New York Rangers**	44	21	13	10	72	65	384	52
**Detroit Cougars**	44	19	16	9	72	63	381	47
Pittsburgh Pirates	44	9	27	8	46	80	324	26
Chicago Black Hawks	44	7	29	8	33	85	363	22

Note: GP = Games Played, W = Wins, L = Losses, T = Ties, Pts = Points, GF = Goals For, GA = Goals Against
Teams that qualified for the playoffs are highlighted in bold.

=== Record vs. opponents ===
==== Vs. American Division ====
1928–29 NHL records
Team	BOS	CHI	DET	NYR	PIT	Total
Boston	—	4–1–1	4–1–1	5–1	5–1	**18–4–2**
Chicago	1–4–1	—	1–4–1	0–4–2	2–3–1	**4–15–5**
Detroit	1–4–1	4–1–1	—	1–4–1	5–1	**11–10–3**
N.Y. Rangers	1–5	4–0–2	4–1–1	—	4–0–2	**13–6–5**
Pittsburgh	1–5	3–2–1	1–5	0–4–2	—	**5–16–3**

==== Vs. Canadian Division ====
1928–29 NHL records
Team	MTL	MTM	NYA	OTT	TOR	Total
Boston	1–2–1	3–1	0–3–1	2–1–1	2–2	**8–9–3**
Chicago	0–4	1–2–1	1–3	1–2–1	0–3–1	**3–14–3**
Detroit	1–1–2	2–1–1	2–1–1	1–1–2	2–2	**8–6–6**
N.Y. Rangers	1–1–2	0–3–1	1–1–2	3–1	3–1	**8–7–5**
Pittsburgh	0–2–2	1–2–1	2–2	0–3–1	1–2–1	**4–11–5**

== Schedule and results ==
1928–29 regular season
November

Game	Date	Visitor	Score	Home	Record	Pts
1	November 15	Boston Bruins	1–0	Pittsburgh Pirates	1–0–0	2
2	November 17	Boston Bruins	2–2	Ottawa Senators	1–0–1	3
3	November 20	Montreal Canadiens	1–0	Boston Bruins	1–1–1	3
4	November 22	Boston Bruins	0–2	Detroit Cougars	1–2–1	3
5	November 25	Boston Bruins	1–1	Chicago Black Hawks	1–2–2	4
6	November 27	Pittsburgh Pirates	0–1	Boston Bruins	2–2–2	6

December

Game	Date	Visitor	Score	Home	Record	Pts
7	December 4	New York Rangers	0–2	Boston Bruins	3–2–2	8
8	December 8	Montreal Maroons	1–5	Boston Bruins	4–2–2	10
9	December 9	Boston Bruins	1–2	New York Americans	4–3–2	10
10	December 11	New York Americans	3–0	Boston Bruins	4–4–2	10
11	December 15	Boston Bruins	0–2	Toronto Maple Leafs	4–5–2	10
12	December 18	Detroit Cougars	1–3	Boston Bruins	5–5–2	12
13	December 25	Chicago Black Hawks	2–1	Boston Bruins	5–6–2	12
14	December 30	Boston Bruins	0–2	New York Rangers	5–7–2	12

January

Game	Date	Visitor	Score	Home	Record	Pts
15	January 1	Ottawa Senators	0–3	Boston Bruins	6–7–2	14
16	January 3	Boston Bruins	1–0	Montreal Maroons	7–7–2	16
17	January 5	Pittsburgh Pirates	2–3	Boston Bruins	8–7–2	18
18	January 8	Toronto Maple Leafs	2–5	Boston Bruins	9–7–2	20
19	January 10	Boston Bruins	4–2	Montreal Canadiens	10–7–2	22
20	January 12	Detroit Cougars	2–3	Boston Bruins	11–7–2	24
21	January 15	New York Rangers	1–4	Boston Bruins	12–7–2	26
22	January 17	Boston Bruins	1–1	Detroit Cougars	12–7–3	27
23	January 20	Boston Bruins	2–0	Chicago Black Hawks	13–7–3	29
24	January 22	Montreal Canadiens	0–0	Boston Bruins	13–7–4	30
25	January 27	Boston Bruins	2–1	New York Rangers	14–7–4	32
26	January 29	Chicago Black Hawks	1–4	Boston Bruins	15–7–4	34
27	January 31	Boston Bruins	3–1	Toronto Maple Leafs	16–7–4	36

February

Game	Date	Visitor	Score	Home	Record	Pts
28	February 2	Toronto Maple Leafs	3–0	Boston Bruins	16–8–4	36
29	February 5	New York Americans	1–0	Boston Bruins	16–9–4	36
30	February 9	Boston Bruins	0–1	Montreal Maroons	16–10–4	36
31	February 12	Detroit Cougars	0–1	Boston Bruins	17–10–4	38
32	February 14	Boston Bruins	0–2	Pittsburgh Pirates	17–11–4	38
33	February 16	Boston Bruins	3–0	Chicago Black Hawks	18–11–4	40
34	February 19	Pittsburgh Pirates	0–1	Boston Bruins	19–11–4	42
35	February 24	Boston Bruins	2–2	New York Americans	19–11–5	43
36	February 26	Montreal Maroons	0–1	Boston Bruins	20–11–5	45
37	February 28	Boston Bruins	4–0	Ottawa Senators	21–11–5	47

March

Game	Date	Visitor	Score	Home	Record	Pts
38	March 2	Boston Bruins	0–3	Montreal Canadiens	21–12–5	47
39	March 5	New York Rangers	1–2	Boston Bruins	22–12–5	49
40	March 9	Ottawa Senators	2–1	Boston Bruins	22–13–5	49
41	March 10	Boston Bruins	3–2	New York Rangers	23–13–5	51
42	March 12	Chicago Black Hawks	1–11	Boston Bruins	24–13–5	53
43	March 14	Boston Bruins	5–1	Detroit Cougars	25–13–5	55
44	March 16	Boston Bruins	3–1	Pittsburgh Pirates	26–13–5	57

Legend: Win (2 points) Loss (0 points) Tie (1 point)

== Playoffs ==
In the playoffs, Boston had a first round bye, due to finishing on top of the American Division, and faced the Montreal Canadiens, the winners of the Canadian Division, in the semi-finals in a best-of-five series. The series began with two games at the Boston Garden, and the Bruins, led by Tiny Thompson, won both games by identical 1–0 scores to take a 2–0 series lead. Game Three shifted to Montreal, and while the Canadiens were able to solve Thompson for two goals, Boston scored three of their own, and swept the series.

In the first Stanley Cup Final exclusively played between American teams, Boston faced their divisional rival – and the team that eliminated them from the playoffs the previous season – the New York Rangers in a best-of-three series. New York had defeated the Detroit Cougars and the Toronto Maple Leafs to earn a spot in the Final. Game One was played in Boston, and Thompson again shut the door, as the Bruins won the game 2–0. Boston completed the two-game sweep at Madison Square Garden in New York City, defeating the Rangers 2–1 on March 29 on a goal by Bill Carson, to clinch the first Stanley Cup in team history and making them the third American team to win the Cup championship.

1929 Stanley Cup playoffs
Semifinals vs. (C1) Montreal Canadiens – Bruins win 3–0

Game	Date	Visitor	Score	Home	Series
1	March 19	Montreal Canadiens	0–1	Boston Bruins	1–0
2	March 21	Montreal Canadiens	0–1	Boston Bruins	2–0
3	March 23	Boston Bruins	3–2	Montreal Canadiens	3–0

Stanley Cup Finals vs. (A2) New York Rangers – Bruins win 2–0

Game	Date	Visitor	Score	Home	Series
1	March 28	New York Rangers	0–2	Boston Bruins	1–0
2	March 29	Boston Bruins	2–1	New York Rangers	2–0

Legend: Win Loss

== Player statistics ==
=== Regular season ===
Scoring

Player	Pos	GP	G	A	Pts	PIM
Harry Oliver	RW	43	17	6	23	24
Dutch Gainor	C	44	14	5	19	30
Eddie Shore	D	39	12	7	19	96
Cooney Weiland	C	42	11	7	18	16
Dit Clapper	RW/D	40	9	2	11	48
Mickey MacKay	C	30	8	2	10	18
George Owen	D	27	5	4	9	48
Bill Carson	C	19	4	2	6	10
Frank Fredrickson	C	12	3	1	4	24
Percy Galbraith	LW/D	38	2	1	3	44
Cy Denneny	LW	23	1	2	3	2
Lionel Hitchman	D	38	1	0	1	64
Lloyd Klein	LW	8	1	0	1	5
Myles Lane	D	19	1	0	1	2
Red Green	LW	22	0	0	0	16
Eric Pettinger	LW/C	17	0	0	0	17
Eddie Rodden	C	20	0	0	0	10
Tiny Thompson	G	44	0	0	0	0

Goaltending

Player	MIN	GP	W	L	T	GA	GAA	SO
Tiny Thompson	2710	44	26	13	5	52	1.15	12
Team:	2710	44	26	13	5	52	1.15	12

=== Playoffs ===
Scoring

Player	Pos	GP	G	A	Pts	PIM
Bill Carson	C	5	2	0	2	8
Dutch Gainor	C	5	2	0	2	4
Cooney Weiland	C	5	2	0	2	2
Harry Oliver	RW	5	1	1	2	8
Eddie Shore	D	5	1	1	2	28
Dit Clapper	RW/D	5	1	0	1	0
Lionel Hitchman	D	5	0	1	1	22
Cy Denneny	LW	2	0	0	0	0
Percy Galbraith	LW/D	5	0	0	0	2
Red Green	LW	1	0	0	0	0
Myles Lane	D	5	0	0	0	0
Mickey MacKay	C	3	0	0	0	2
George Owen	D	5	0	0	0	0
Tiny Thompson	G	5	0	0	0	0

Goaltending

Player	MIN	GP	W	L	GA	GAA	SO
Tiny Thompson	300	5	5	0	3	0.60	3
Team:	300	5	5	0	3	0.60	3

Note:

Pos = Position;GP = Games played; G = Goals; A = Assists; Pts = Points; PIM = Penalty minutes; +/- = Plus/minus; PPG = Power-play goals; SHG = Short-handed goals; GWG = Game-winning goals
Pos = Position;GP = Games played; Min, TOI = Minutes played; W = Wins; L = Losses; T,T/OT = Ties; OTL = Overtime losses; GA = Goals-against; GAA = Goals-against average; SO = Shutouts; SA = Shots against; SV = Shots saved;SV% = Save percentage;

== Transactions ==
- Traded Frank Fredrickson to the Pittsburgh Pirates for Mickey MacKay.
- Purchased Bill Carson from Toronto Maple Leafs for $25,000, January 25, 1929.
- Traded Eric Pettinger to Toronto Maple Leafs with the rights to Hugh Plaxton for the rights to George Owen, January 29, 1929.
- Purchased Myles Lane from New York Rangers for $7,500.

== See also ==
- 1928–29 NHL season
- List of Stanley Cup champions
