= Tiny Thompson =

Canadian ice hockey player (1903–1981)

- Hockey Hall of Fame, 1959
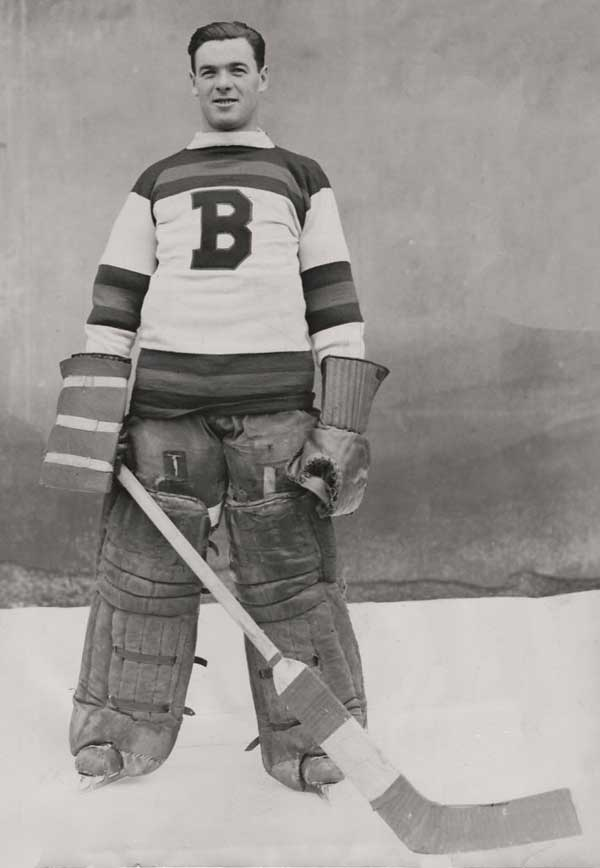
- Thompson with the Boston Bruins in the 1930s
- Born: May 31, 1903 Sandon, British Columbia, Canada
- Died: February 9, 1981 (aged 77) Calgary, Alberta, Canada
- Height: 5 ft 10 in (178 cm)
- Weight: 160 lb (73 kg; 11 st 6 lb)
- Position: Goaltender
- Caught: Left
- Played for: Boston Bruins; Detroit Red Wings
- Playing career: 1928–1941

Cecil Ralph "Tiny" Thompson (May 31, 1903 – February 9, 1981) was a Canadian professional ice hockey player. A goaltender, he played 12 seasons in the National Hockey League (NHL), first for the Boston Bruins and later for the Detroit Red Wings. A four-time Vezina Trophy winner, Thompson was inducted into the Hockey Hall of Fame in 1959. He was a member of one Stanley Cup-winning team, as a rookie in the 1928–29 season with the Boston Bruins. At the start of the 1938–39 season, after ten full seasons with Boston, he was traded to the Detroit Red Wings, where he completed the season, and played another full one before retiring. During his NHL career, he recorded 81 shutouts, the sixth-highest of any goaltender. After retiring from playing, he coached lower-league teams before becoming a noted professional scout. Thompson helped popularize the technique of the "glove save" which was catching the puck with his hands as a method of making a save. A competent puckhandler, he was the first goaltender in the NHL to record an assist in 1936 by passing the puck with his stick to a fellow player.

== Early life ==
Thompson was born in the mining community of Sandon, British Columbia. He grew up in Calgary, Alberta, where his brother, Paul—who also became a professional ice hockey player—was born in 1906. As a child, he enjoyed playing baseball and ice hockey. Initially, Thompson was not a goaltender, though he agreed to play the position to get into games. As a teenager playing competitive ice hockey, he acquired the nickname "Tiny" as a joke, as he was the tallest player on the team, standing 5 ft 10 in (1.78 m); the nickname stuck with him for the rest of his career.

Thompson began his junior career playing for the Calgary Monarchs in 1919 at the age of 16. He competed for the Memorial Cup, awarded to the Canadian junior hockey champions that year, playing in two games and surrendering 11 goals, a respectable amount in that era. After spending the 1920–21 season playing for Calgary Alberta Grain, Thompson played three seasons in Bellevue, Alberta. In the 1924–25 season, he joined the Duluth Hornets, playing 40 games, recording a shutout in 11 of them. The following season, Thompson joined the Minneapolis Millers of the American Hockey Association (AHA). In his three seasons with the Millers, he appeared in 118 games, recording 33 shutouts with a 1.37 goals against average (average of goals surrendered in a span of sixty minutes).

== NHL career ==
=== Boston Bruins ===
Thompson began his National Hockey League (NHL) career with the Boston Bruins in the 1928–29 season after his contract was purchased by Boston manager Art Ross. Despite having never seen Thompson play, Ross had heard about Thompson's good reputation in Minnesota. In his first game, he posted a shutout, becoming the only Hockey Hall of Fame goaltender to accomplish this feat. In his first season, he appeared in all 44 of the Bruins' games, posting 12 shutouts and a 1.15 goals-against average, the fourth-lowest goals-against average in NHL history to date, behind Alec Connell's 1.12 GAA and George Hainsworth's 1.05 and 0.98 GAA. Hainsworth set his record that same season. Placing first in the American Division, the Bruins had a perfect record in the playoffs en route to their first Stanley Cup victory, defeating the Montreal Canadiens and the New York Rangers. Thompson recorded three shutouts in the five playoff games, and allowed only three goals. Tiny faced his brother Paul Thompson in the 1929 Stanley Cup Final, marking the first time a set of brothers faced each other in a goaltender-forward combination in Stanley Cup Final history. Tiny said of the matchup: "When I played goal for Boston against Paul (in) the final of 1929, he was just a rookie. It was really no contest."

The following season, Thompson again appeared in all of the Bruins' 44 games, posting three shutouts and a 2.19 goals-against average. The league changed its rules on forward passing, which resulted in a sharp increase in goal-scoring. Boston won all but six games, finishing with a 38–5–1 record, the best winning percentage for any team in a season. Surrendering only 98 goals, Thompson bested Chicago goaltender Charlie Gardiner to win the first of his four Vezina Trophies. The Vezina Trophy is awarded to the league's top goaltender, which was determined prior to the 1981–82 season by number of goals surrendered by goaltenders who had played a minimum number of games. In the playoffs, however, they suffered their first two-game losing streak, as they were swept 2–0 by the Canadiens in the Stanley Cup Final. Earlier in the playoffs, Thompson's winning streak of seven playoff games was snapped; it remains, as of 2014, the longest playoff winning streak to start a career.

In the 1930–31 season, he played all 44 games again, and was named to the second All-Star team. In the playoffs, Boston lost the semifinals to the Montreal Canadiens; during game two of the series Thompson became the first goaltender to be pulled for a sixth attacker at the end of a game to give his team a higher chance to score a goal. Even though Boston still lost, coach Art Ross' maneuver was described as "amazing" the following day, and this technique, known as "open net", caught on with the rest of the league.

The Bruins missed the playoffs for the first time in Thompson's career in the 1931–32 season. He won only 13 games while appearing in 43 out of Boston's 48 games, which was the only time he missed games as a member of the Bruins. The next season, Boston made the playoffs once more, losing to the Toronto Maple Leafs. The final game of the playoff series was described as Thompson's most memorable. During that game, Toronto and Boston were tied after regulation time and over 100 minutes of overtime proceeded, with Thompson dueling Toronto's goaltender Lorne Chabot. After the end of the fifth overtime period, managers Conn Smythe of the Maple Leafs and Art Ross of the Bruins asked league president Frank Calder to suspend the game, but Calder refused. Early in the sixth overtime period, a pass from Boston defenseman Eddie Shore was intercepted, and Ken Doraty skated in on a breakaway, cleanly beating Thompson at 4:46 of the period. The losing goaltender in the second-longest NHL game, Thompson received a standing ovation from fans at the Maple Leaf Gardens. Thompson finished the playoff series with 1.23 goals-against average, despite a losing record.

Thompson became the second goaltender to win his second Vezina Trophy in 1932–33 since its inception in the 1926–27 season, as he recorded 11 shutouts and a 1.76 goals-against average. After missing the playoffs in the 1933–34 season, the Bruins rebounded to first place in the American Division the following season, as Thompson was named to the second All-Star team for the second time. In the playoffs, the Bruins won only one of their four games; their only win was on the strength of Thompson's shutout, who finished the playoffs with a 1.53 goals-against average.

In the 1935–36 NHL season, Thompson recorded 10 shutouts, but Boston managed to win only 22 out of their 48 games. During the season, he recorded an assist, a rarity for goaltenders. At the end of the season, he was named to the first All-Star team for the first time, and won the Vezina Trophy for the third time, tying George Hainsworth's all-time mark with three victories. The ensuing two-game, total-goal playoff series against the Toronto Maple Leafs was a series of contrasts, as the Bruins lost 8–6. In the opening game, the Bruins shut out Toronto 3–0, while they lost the other game 8–3. In 1937–38, his final full season with the Bruins, he won 30 out of the 48 games, but Boston lost to the Maple Leafs once again in the playoffs. Thompson set a new record by winning his fourth and final Vezina Trophy. He was also named to the first All-Star team for the second time.

When Thompson left the Bruins, he had compiled 252 wins. This record stood for 81 years, until it was surpassed by Tuukka Rask. Thompson is also the Boston Bruins' all-time leader in regular-season shutouts with 74, ahead of the 52 achieved by runner-up Tuukka Rask.

=== Detroit Red Wings ===
Thompson appeared in only five games for the Bruins in the 1938–39 season, as Boston decided to replace the aging goaltender with the substantially younger Frank Brimsek who was 12 years his junior. Brimsek would go on to lead the Bruins to a Stanley Cup victory that season, earning the nickname "Mister Zero" while picking up 10 regular season shutouts, the Vezina Trophy, first All-Star team honours, and the Calder Memorial Trophy, which is given "to the player selected as the most proficient in his first year of competition". To make space for Brimsek, Thompson was traded to the Detroit Red Wings for Normie Smith and $15,000 on November 16, 1938; Thompson also received a $1,000 bonus from Boston.

Boston manager Art Ross predicted that Thompson, now 35, would play for the Red Wings for at least another five seasons; however, Thompson remained with the team for only two seasons before retiring from playing. The Red Wings posted a losing record in both of these seasons, although they made the playoffs both times. Overall, Thompson appeared in 85 regular-season games for Detroit, recording a 32–41–12 record, seven shutouts, and a 2.54 goals-against average, and in 11 playoff games, posting a 5–6, with one shutout and a 2.41 goal-against average.

== Post-NHL career ==
After retiring from professional play, Thompson became the head coach of the Buffalo Bisons of the American Hockey League (AHL) in the 1940–41 season. He coached 56 games in two seasons. The Bisons missed the playoffs both times. He appeared in one game as goaltender in the 1940–41 season. During World War II, Thompson served in the Royal Canadian Air Force and doubled as the coach of the Calgary RCAF Mustangs of the Alberta Senior Hockey League. He led the Mustangs to the league championship series in 1942–43 against the Calgary Currie Army team where injuries to the Mustangs' goaltenders brought him back onto the ice in March 1943. With Thompson in goal, the Mustangs defeated Currie Army 8–4 to tie the best-of-five series at two wins apiece. He played the deciding game, but his team fell short of winning the Alberta title with a 3–1 loss to Currie Army. After the war, Thompson became chief Western Canada scout for the Chicago Black Hawks. He was one of the few scouts at the time who sought to discover a player's personality along with their playing ability. Thompson often conversed with players as part of an effort to learn about the players he was watching.

== Playing style ==
Thompson was "the first of the great floppers" and frequently dove on his belly to stop a puck. He was one of the first NHL goaltenders to catch the puck with his hand to make a save, and helped popularize the technique. Using gloves that were smaller than those of other players, he was among the best puck-catchers of his era. He stood in the way of the puck with minimal padding, risking being struck when moving to catch it instead of simply deflecting it away from the net. His signature technique, very often featured in photographs of him, involved dropping to one knee with the paddle of his goalstick covering the five-hole, and extending his glove to cover the left side of the net. Although he caught the puck with his glove, the gloves he had did not have anything like the level of safety and comfort provided by the modern blocker and trapper glove combination. Thompson was described by Johnny Bower, a former goaltender who was inducted into the Hockey Hall of Fame, as a good puckhandler, and one of the best of his time at forward passing. In the 1935–36 season, Thompson became the first goaltender to get an assist by intentionally passing the puck with his stick to a fellow player.

Thompson's points percentage in a season of .875, recorded in the 1929–30 season, still remains a record. His 38 wins during that season was a Boston record that was eclipsed only in the 1982–83 season, by Pete Peeters (who won 40 of 62 games played); since then, no Bruins goaltender has had more than 37 wins in a season. His 14 consecutive wins that regular season also set an NHL record, which has since been tied by 3 other goaltenders. Thompson is the all-time Bruins leader for shutouts and goals-against average. Thompson held the records for most games played (468) and wins (252) by a Bruins goaltender until 2019, when both records were surpassed by Tuukka Rask. Throughout his entire NHL career, Thompson accrued 81 shutouts, which is sixth all-time in NHL history, and was second to only George Hainsworth (who had 94) when Thompson retired. He also posted seven shutouts in the playoffs. He still has the most shutouts in Bruins history with 74. He is fifth all-time in goals-against average, allowing on average only 2.08 per a 60-minute span. He led all goaltenders in regular-season games played 10 times, and in regular-season wins five times. He was one of the most influential goalies of his era, his former coach Art Ross compared him to Georges Vezina and Jack Adams referred to him as the best goalie in the world.

In 1959, Thompson was inducted into the Hockey Hall of Fame. He died in Calgary on February 9, 1981. He was survived by his wife, Edith, and his daughter, Sandra.

In 2023, he was named one of the top 100 Bruins players of all time as part of their All-Centennial Team.

== Career statistics ==
=== Regular season and playoffs ===
			Regular season								Playoffs
Season	Team	League	GP	W	L	T	Min	GA	SO	GAA	GP	W	L	T	Min	GA	SO	GAA
1919–20	Calgary Monarchs	CCJHL	—	—	—	—	—	—	—	—	—	—	—	—	—	—	—	—
1919–20	Calgary Monarchs	M-Cup	—	—	—	—	—	—	—	—	2	1	0	1	120	11	0	5.50
1920–21	Calgary Alberta Grain	CCSHL	—	—	—	—	—	—	—	—	—	—	—	—	—	—	—	—
1921–22	Bellevue Bulldogs	ASHL	—	—	—	—	—	—	—	—	—	—	—	—	—	—	—	—
1922–23	Bellevue Bulldogs	ASHL	—	—	—	—	—	—	—	—	—	—	—	—	—	—	—	—
1923–24	Bellevue Bulldogs	ASHL	—	—	—	—	—	—	—	—	—	—	—	—	—	—	—	—
1923–24	Bellevue Bulldogs	Al-Cup	—	—	—	—	—	—	—	—	4	1	2	1	240	10	1	2.50
1924–25	Duluth Hornets	USAHA	40	17	20	3	1920	59	11	1.38	—	—	—	—	—	—	—	—
1925–26	Minneapolis Millers	CHL	36	—	—	—	2160	59	10	1.64	3	3	0	0	180	1	2	0.33
1926–27	Minneapolis Millers	AHA	38	17	11	10	2253	51	9	1.42	6	3	3	0	361	8	1	1.33
1927–28	Minneapolis Millers	AHA	40	28	7	5	2475	51	12	1.23	8	4	0	4	520	3	5	0.38
1928–29	Boston Bruins	NHL	44	26	13	5	2710	52	12	1.15	5	5	0	0	300	3	3	0.60
1929–30	Boston Bruins	NHL	44	38	5	1	2680	98	3	2.19	6	3	3	0	432	12	0	1.67
1930–31	Boston Bruins	NHL	44	28	10	6	2730	90	3	1.98	5	2	3	0	343	13	0	2.27
1931–32	Boston Bruins	NHL	43	13	19	11	2698	103	9	2.29	—	—	—	—	—	—	—	—
1932–33	Boston Bruins	NHL	48	25	15	8	3000	88	11	1.76	5	2	3	0	438	9	0	1.23
1933–34	Boston Bruins	NHL	48	18	25	5	2980	130	5	2.62	—	—	—	—	—	—	—	—
1934–35	Boston Bruins	NHL	48	26	16	6	2970	112	8	2.26	4	1	3	0	275	7	1	1.53
1935–36	Boston Bruins	NHL	48	22	20	6	2930	82	10	1.68	2	1	1	0	120	8	1	4.00
1936–37	Boston Bruins	NHL	48	23	18	7	2970	110	6	2.22	3	1	2	—	180	8	1	2.67
1937–38	Boston Bruins	NHL	48	30	11	7	2970	89	7	1.80	3	0	3	—	212	6	0	1.70
1938–39	Boston Bruins	NHL	5	3	1	1	310	8	0	1.55	—	—	—	—	—	—	—	—
1938–39	Detroit Red Wings	NHL	39	16	17	6	2397	101	4	2.53	6	3	3	—	374	15	1	2.41
1939–40	Detroit Red Wings	NHL	46	16	24	6	2830	120	3	2.54	5	2	3	—	300	12	0	2.40
1940–41	Buffalo Bisons	AHL	1	0	0	0	40	1	0	1.50	—	—	—	—	—	—	—	—
1942–43	Calgary RCAF Mustangs	CNDHL	—	—	—	—	—	—	—	—	4	—	—	—	—	11	0	3.00
NHL totals			553	284	194	75	34,175	1183	81	2.08	44	20	24	0	2974	93	7	1.88

== Awards ==
=== NHL ===
Award	Years
Vezina Trophy	1930, 1933, 1936, 1938
First All-Star team Goaltender	1936, 1938
Second All-Star team Goaltender	1931, 1935
Stanley Cup	1929

=== Boston Bruins ===
Award	Years
Elizabeth C. Dufresne Trophy	1936, 1937
Named one of the top 100 best Bruins players of all time	2023

Awards and achievements
Preceded by George Hainsworth	Winner of the Vezina Trophy; 1930	Succeeded by Roy Worters
Preceded by Charlie Gardiner	Winner of the Vezina Trophy; 1933	Succeeded by Charlie Gardiner
Preceded by Lorne Chabot	Winner of the Vezina Trophy; 1936	Succeeded by Normie Smith
Preceded by Normie Smith	Winner of the Vezina Trophy; 1938	Succeeded by Frank Brimsek
