= Flat Walsh =

Canadian ice hockey player

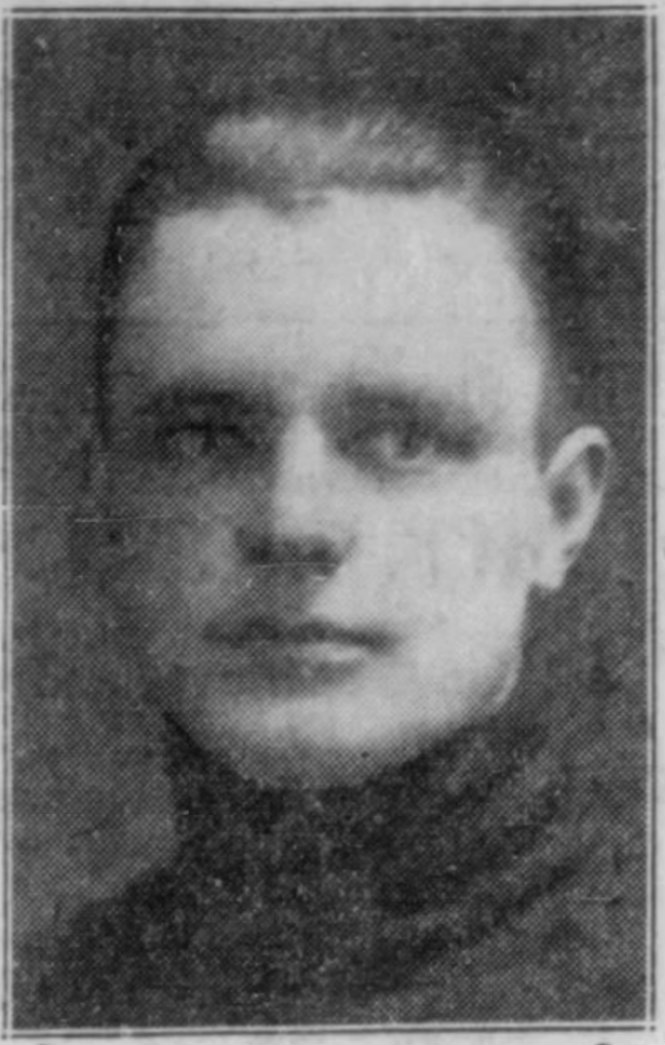
- Walsh with Sault Ste. Marie Greyhounds
- Born: March 23, 1897; Kingston, Ontario, Canada
- Died: December 2, 1959 (aged 62); Kingston, Ontario, Canada
- Height: 5 ft 11 in (180 cm)
- Weight: 175 lb (79 kg; 12 st 7 lb)
- Position: Goaltender
- Played for: Montreal Maroons; New York Americans
- Playing career: 1915–1933

James Patrick "Flat" Walsh (March 23, 1897 — December 2, 1959) was a Canadian professional ice hockey goaltender. He played in the National Hockey League (NHL) for the Montreal Maroons and New York Americans between 1927 and 1933. Much of his career, which spanned 1915 through 1933, was spent in various minor leagues.

== Biography ==
Walsh was one of the first back-up goaltenders in NHL history, as the Montreal Maroons kept him as a spare for the great Clint Benedict in case of injury. He played one game during the 1926–27 season and one game in 1927–28. In 1928–29, Roy Worters was suspended by NHL president Frank Calder for not reporting to the Pittsburgh Pirates. Worters was sold to the New York Americans, but the Pirates failed to inform Calder of these arrangements and Calder, on his dignity, refused to lift Worters' suspension. As a result, the Americans borrowed Walsh for a few games and he did quite well.

In 1929–30, after Clint Benedict broke his nose on a Howie Morenz shot, Walsh became the Maroons regular goaltender. The following year, James Strachan felt that Walsh could not handle the goaltending alone and Walsh shared the goaltending with Dave Kerr. In 1931–32, Walsh shared the goaltending chores with Normie Smith. Kerr was back to share the goaltending with Walsh in 1932–33, but Walsh came down with influenza which he suffered for a full two weeks and he decided to retire, which saddened Montreal fans, as he was popular with them.

After his retirement, Walsh served as assistant coach with the Maroons in 1934–35. He competed in curling in the 1940s. Walsh died in December 1959; he was survived by his wife and two children.

== Career statistics ==
=== Regular season and playoffs ===
			Regular season								Playoffs
Season	Team	League	GP	W	L	T	Min	GA	SO	GAA	GP	W	L	T	Min	GA	SO	GAA
1914–15	Kingston Frontenacs	OHA Sr	4	3	1	0	260	14	0	3.23	3	1	1	1	180	13	0	4.33
1915–16	Kingston Frontenacs	OHA Sr	1	0	1	0	60	7	0	7.00	—	—	—	—	—	—	—	—
1916–17	Kingston Frontenacs	OHA Sr	3	3	0	0	180	8	0	2.67	4	3	1	0	240	14	0	3.50
1918–19	Kingston Frontenacs	OHA Sr	4	3	1	0	240	11	1	2.75	8	4	4	0	480	26	0	3.25
1919–20	Sault Ste. Marie Greyhounds	NOHA	5	1	3	1	330	23	0	4.18	—	—	—	—	—	—	—	—
1919–20	Sault Ste. Marie Greyhounds	NMHL	14	9	3	2	930	26	2	1.68	—	—	—	—	—	—	—	—
1920–21	Sault Ste. Marie Greyhounds	NOHA	9	7	1	1	570	14	4	1.47	5	3	2	0	300	24	0	4.80
1920–21	Sault Ste. Marie Greyhounds	NMHL	16	13	3	0	970	26	6	1.61	—	—	—	—	—	—	—	—
1921–22	Sault Ste. Marie Greyhounds	NOHA	8	7	1	0	500	18	1	2.16	2	0	1	1	120	7	0	3.50
1921–22	Sault Ste. Marie Greyhounds	NMHL	12	11	1	0	720	16	1	1.33	—	—	—	—	—	—	—	—
1922–23	Sault Ste. Marie Greyhounds	NOHA	8	4	4	0	476	22	0	2.77	2	1	0	1	120	4	0	2.00
1922–23	Sault Ste. Marie Greyhounds	NMHL	5	4	1	0	300	17	0	3.40	—	—	—	—	—	—	—	—
1923–24	Sault Ste. Marie Greyhounds	NOHA	7	6	1	0	400	19	0	2.85	7	5	2	0	420	11	2	1.57
1925–26	Sault Ste. Marie Greyhounds	CHL	32	—	—	—	1920	100	1	3.13	—	—	—	—	—	—	—	—
1926–27	Montreal Maroons	NHL	1	0	1	0	60	3	0	3.00	—	—	—	—	—	—	—	—
1926–27	Detroit Greyhounds	AHA	6	0	6	0	360	23	0	3.83	—	—	—	—	—	—	—	—
1927–28	Montreal Maroons	NHL	1	0	0	0	40	1	0	1.50	—	—	—	—	—	—	—	—
1928–29	New York Americans	NHL	4	2	0	2	260	1	3	0.23	—	—	—	—	—	—	—	—
1928–29	Montreal Maroons	NHL	7	1	4	2	450	8	1	1.07	—	—	—	—	—	—	—	—
1929–30	Montreal Maroons	NHL	32	17	11	4	1939	77	2	2.38	4	1	3	0	313	2	1	0.38
1930–31	Montreal Maroons	NHL	16	6	6	2	900	35	2	2.33	—	—	—	—	—	—	—	—
1931–32	Montreal Maroons	NHL	28	14	11	3	1730	77	2	2.67	4	1	1	2	258	5	1	1.16
1931–32	New Haven Eagles	Can-Am	18	7	9	2	1110	27	6	1.46	—	—	—	—	—	—	—	—
1932–33	Montreal Maroons	NHL	22	8	11	2	1303	56	2	2.58	—	—	—	—	—	—	—	—
1932–33	Quebec Castors	Can-Am	3	2	1	0	180	3	2	1.00	—	—	—	—	—	—	—	—
NHL totals			111	48	44	15	6682	258	12	2.32	8	2	4	2	570	7	2	0.74

== Sources ==
- Coleman, Charles L. (1969). The Trail of the Stanley Cup: Vol. 2. National Hockey League. ASIN B000OV78HI.
