= Myles Lane =

American professional athlete and attorney (1903 – 1987)

- Lane as a college football player
- Born: October 2, 1903 Melrose, Massachusetts, U.S.
- Died: August 6, 1987 (aged 83) New York, New York, U.S.
- Height: 6 ft 0 in (183 cm)
- Weight: 180 lb (82 kg; 12 st 12 lb)
- Position: Defense
- Shot: Left
- Played for: New York Rangers; Boston Bruins
- Playing career: 1928–1934
- Coaching career

Playing career
- 1925–1928: Dartmouth
- Position: Halfback

Coaching career (HC unless noted)
- 1929: Dartmouth (backfield/freshmen)
- 1932: Boston University
- 1934: Harvard (backfield)

Head coaching record
- Overall: 2–3–2
- College Football Hall of Fame; Inducted in 1970 (profile)

Myles Stanley Joseph Lane (October 2, 1903 – August 6, 1987) was an American professional ice hockey player, college football player and coach, and New York Supreme Court justice. He played in the National Hockey League with the New York Rangers and Boston Bruins between 1928 and 1934. With the Bruins he won the Stanley Cup in 1929; he was the last surviving member of the team.

== Hockey ==
A star player at Dartmouth College, Lane signed with the New York Rangers on October 1, 1928. He became only the third American-born player and the first American-trained player to join the National Hockey League.

In 1928, Lane was offered by the Rangers to the Bruins for Eddie Shore and $5,000. Rangers president John S. Hammond believed that because Lane was such a hero in his home state, the Bruins would do anything to acquire him. According to former Rangers publicity director Stan Saplin, who got the story from Lester Patrick, the telegram Bruins' president, Charles F. Adams sent back read: GET A LIFE PRESERVER - YOU ARE MYLES FROM SHORE. The Rangers later sold his contract to the Bruins for $7,500. He was with the Bruins when they won the Stanley Cup in 1929. From 1931 to 1934, played for the minor league Boston Cubs of the Canadian-American Hockey League.

== Football ==
Lane was an all-American halfback at Dartmouth from 1925 to 1928, where he led the nation in scoring.

After his playing career ended, Lane turned to coaching. In 1929, he was Dartmouth's backfield coach as well as head coach of the freshman team. In 1932, he was head football coach at Boston University. He had a 2–3–2 record in his only season with the Terriers. He was the backfield coach at Harvard in 1933 where he coached, among others, his brother Francis Lane.

Lane was elected to the College Football Hall of Fame in 1970.

== Baseball ==
From 1929 to 1931, Lane played summer baseball for the Osterville town team in the Cape Cod Baseball League. He was reportedly a "hard-hitting" player who was "liable to grab a homer at any point."

== Legal career ==
After graduating from Boston College Law School in 1934, Lane joined the firm of O'Connor & Farber. Three years later he was appointed an assistant United States attorney for the U.S. Attorney for the Southern District of New York. He then spent four years in the Navy in World War II. After the war he rejoined the US Attorney's office, becoming chief assistant. He was a member of the prosecution team in the Rosenberg trial. At this appointment, he became an integral piece in convicting Ethel Rosenberg on the count of conspiracy to commit espionage; a charge resulting in her death alongside her husband Julius Rosenberg in 1953. Though, admittedly, the case against Ethel was "not strong" Lane encouraged a closed-door congressional joint committee on Atomic Energy: "... I think it is very important that she be convicted, too, and given a stiff sentence."

In September 1951, Lane was appointed United States Attorney, a position he held until April 1953, when he returned to private law practice. He was a Democrat.

In 1958, Lane was appointed chairman of the State Investigation Commission by governor W. Averell Harriman. During his years with the commission, the agency looked into issues such as school building flaws, hospital abuses, narcotics problems, underworld activities and bid-rigging on New York City's purchases of rock salt.

Lane was elected to the New York Supreme Court in 1968. One notable case Lane decided was known as the "dog case". He ruled that "the present circumstances of rampant crime" allowed a woman to keep her schnauzer despite a lease forbidding dogs. He was subsequently overruled by an appeals court.

Lane was appointed to the New York Supreme Court, Appellate Division, First Department in 1974, where he remained until his retirement in 1979.

== Personal life ==
Lane and his wife, Margaret, lived in New York.

== Career statistics ==
=== Regular season and playoffs ===
			Regular season					Playoffs
Season	Team	League	GP	G	A	Pts	PIM	GP	G	A	Pts	PIM
1923–24	Boston Athletic Association	USAHA	4	0	0	0	—	—	—	—	—	—
1924–25	Boston Athletic Association	USAHA	1	1	0	1	—	—	—	—	—	—
1925–26	Dartmouth College	Ivy	8	20	0	20	—	—	—	—	—	—
1926–27	Dartmouth College	Ivy	4	10	0	10	—	—	—	—	—	—
1927–28	Dartmouth College	Ivy	5	20	0	20	—	—	—	—	—	—
1928–29	New York Rangers	NHL	24	1	0	1	22	—	—	—	—	—
1928–29	Boston Bruins	NHL	19	1	0	1	2	5	0	0	0	0
1929–30	Boston Bruins	NHL	3	0	0	0	0	6	0	0	0	0
1931–32	Boston Cubs	Can-Am	40	3	4	7	48	5	0	1	1	2
1932–33	Boston Cubs	Can-Am	39	3	10	13	45	7	0	2	2	10
1933–34	Boston Cubs	Can-Am	16	3	2	5	8	—	—	—	—	—
1933–34	Boston Bruins	NHL	25	2	1	3	17	—	—	—	—	—
NHL totals			71	4	1	5	41	11	0	0	0	0

=== Head coaching record ===
Year	Team	Overall	Conference	Standing	Bowl/playoffs
Boston University Pioneers (Independent) (1932)
1932	Boston University	2–3–2			
Boston University:		2–3–2			
Total:		2–3–2			

Legal offices
Preceded by Irving Saypol	U.S. Attorney for the Southern District of New York; September 18, 1951 – April 1, 1953	Succeeded by J. Edward Lumbard
Preceded by Arthur L. Reuter	Chairman of the New York State Investigation Commission; 1958	Succeeded by Jacob Grumet
