= Eric Pettinger =

English-born Canadian ice hockey player

- Born: December 14, 1904 Bradford, England, United Kingdom
- Died: December 24, 1968 (aged 64)
- Height: 6 ft 0 in (183 cm)
- Weight: 176 lb (80 kg; 12 st 8 lb)
- Position: Right Wing
- Shot: Left
- Played for: Ottawa Senators; Toronto Maple Leafs; Boston Bruins
- Playing career: 1923–1937

Eric Robinson "Cowboy" Pettinger (December 14, 1904 in Bradford, England, UK — December 24, 1968) was a British-born Canadian professional ice hockey player. Pettinger played 98 games in the National Hockey League (NHL) with the Ottawa Senators, Toronto Maple Leafs, and Boston Bruins between 1928 and 1931. The rest of his career, which lasted from 1923 to 1937, was spent in various minor leagues. Pettinger is the brother of fellow NHL player Gord Pettinger.

== Playing career ==
As a child, Pettinger's family moved to Regina, Saskatchewan. Pettinger started junior hockey in the Southern Saskatchewan Junior Hockey League with the Regina Pats, competing in three Memorial Cup finals. In 1922, Pettinger joined the Regina Victorias of the Southern Saskatchewan Senior Hockey League, playing there for five seasons. With the Victorias, Pettinger competed in two Allan Cup finals before joining the Manitoba-Thunder Bay Hockey League's Fort William Forts in 1926. After one season in Fort William, Pettinger signed as a free agent with the New York Rangers. Pettinger never joined the Rangers, as his rights were traded a month later to the Toronto Maple Leafs, then two months later traded to Boston, all while playing in Fort William.

Pettinger joined the Bruins for the 1928-29 season, only to be traded once again, this time to the Maple Leafs. Pettinger played one season with the Leafs before being traded to Ottawa as part of the King Clancy deal. Pettinger played in only 13 games with the Senators before he was dealt to the International Hockey League's London Panthers. Pettinger would not return to the NHL, playing with London for five years, before stints with the International-American Hockey League (IAHL)'s Cleveland Barons, the Pacific Coast Hockey League's Portland Buckaroos and the IAHL's Pittsburgh Hornets.

When the Stanley Cup was redone during the 1957–58 season, Pettinger's name was added to the Stanley Cup as a 1929 Boston Bruin, despite being ineligible. Pettinger was a member of the Toronto Maple Leafs the day Boston won the Stanley Cup.

== Career statistics ==
=== Regular season and playoffs ===
			Regular season					Playoffs
Season	Team	League	GP	G	A	Pts	PIM	GP	G	A	Pts	PIM
1921–22	Regina Pats	S-SJHL	5	4	1	5	2	—	—	—	—	—
1921–22	Regina Pats	M-Cup	—	—	—	—	—	8	1	0	1	12
1922–23	Regina Pats	RJrHL	4	5	1	6	0	—	—	—	—	—
1922–23	Regina Victorias	S-SSHL	1	0	0	0	0	—	—	—	—	—
1922–23	Regina Pats	M-Cup	—	—	—	—	—	6	2	1	3	8
1923–24	Regina Pats	RJrHL	6	8	3	11	14	5	6	2	8	6
1923–24	Regina Victorias	S-SSHL	3	0	0	0	0	—	—	—	—	—
1923–24	Regina Pats	M-Cup	—	—	—	—	—	5	6	2	8	6
1924–25	Regina Victorias	S-SSHL	9	9	4	13	4	—	—	—	—	—
1924–25	Regina Victorias	Al-Cup	—	—	—	—	—	5	4	2	6	4
1925–26	Regina Victorias	S-SSHL	17	17	10	27	24	9	7	4	11	6
1925–26	Regina Victorias	Al-Cup	—	—	—	—	—	9	7	4	11	6
1926–27	Fort William Forts	MTBHL	20	7	5	12	37	2	2	1	3	0
1927–28	Fort William Forts	MTBHL	17	22	10	32	12	2	0	0	0	0
1928–29	Boston Bruins	NHL	18	0	0	0	17	—	—	—	—	—
1928–29	Toronto Maple Leafs	NHL	24	3	3	6	24	4	1	0	1	8
1929–30	Toronto Maple Leafs	NHL	43	4	9	13	42	—	—	—	—	—
1930–31	Ottawa Senators	NHL	13	0	0	0	2	—	—	—	—	—
1930–31	London Tecumsehs	IHL	36	9	5	14	44	—	—	—	—	—
1931–32	London Tecumsehs	IHL	48	21	12	33	46	6	0	1	1	8
1932–33	London Tecumsehs	IHL	43	20	21	41	54	6	0	0	0	9
1933–34	London Tecumsehs	IHL	43	11	12	23	41	6	4	3	7	0
1934–35	London Tecumsehs	IHL	44	10	15	25	45	5	4	0	4	5
1935–36	London Tecumsehs	IHL	47	23	19	42	43	2	0	2	2	2
1936–37	Cleveland Falcons	IAHL	10	1	0	1	0	—	—	—	—	—
1936–37	Pittsburgh Hornets	IAHL	2	0	0	0	0	—	—	—	—	—
1936–37	Portland Buckaroos	PCHL	1	0	0	0	0	—	—	—	—	—
IHL totals			261	94	84	178	273	25	8	6	14	24
NHL totals			98	7	12	19	85	4	1	0	1	8

== Awards and honours ==
- IHL First All-Star Team (1936)

Source: Hockey Hall of Fame

== Transactions ==
- September, 1927 - Signed as a free agent by New York Rangers
- October, 1927 - Rights traded to Toronto by New York Rangers for the rights to Yip Foster
- December 21, 1927 - Rights traded to Boston by Toronto with $15,000 for Jimmy Herbert
- January 10, 1929 - Traded to Toronto by Boston with the rights to Hugh Plaxton for the rights to George Owen
- October 11, 1930 - Traded to Ottawa by Toronto with Art Smith and $35,000 for King Clancy
- October 31, 1932 - Traded to London (IHL) by Ottawa for cash

Source: Hockey Hall of Fame

== See also ==
- List of National Hockey League players from the United Kingdom
