= 1928–29 New York Rangers season =

NHL hockey team season

1928–29 New York Rangers
- Division: 2nd American
- 1928–29 record: 21–13–10
- Home record: 12–6–4
- Road record: 9–7–6
- Goals for: 72
- Goals against: 65

Team information
- General manager: Lester Patrick
- Coach: Lester Patrick
- Captain: Bill Cook
- Arena: Madison Square Garden

Team leaders
- Goals: Bill Cook (15)
- Assists: Frank Boucher (16)
- Points: Frank Boucher (26)
- Penalty minutes: Bun Cook (70)
- Wins: John Ross Roach (21)
- Goals against average: John Ross Roach (1.41)

The 1928–29 New York Rangers season was the franchise's third season. During the regular season, the Rangers finished in second place in the American Division with a 21–13–10 record and qualified for the Stanley Cup playoffs. In the postseason, the Rangers won series against the New York Americans and Toronto Maple Leafs to reach the Stanley Cup Finals, where they lost to the Boston Bruins 2–0.

== Regular season ==
=== Final standings ===
American Division
	GP	W	L	T	GF	GA	PIM	Pts
**Boston Bruins**	44	26	13	5	89	52	472	57
**New York Rangers**	44	21	13	10	72	65	384	52
**Detroit Cougars**	44	19	16	9	72	63	381	47
Pittsburgh Pirates	44	9	27	8	46	80	324	26
Chicago Black Hawks	44	7	29	8	33	85	363	22

Note: GP = Games Played, W = Wins, L = Losses, T = Ties, Pts = Points, GF = Goals For, GA = Goals Against
Teams that qualified for the playoffs are highlighted in bold.

=== Record vs. opponents ===
==== Vs. American Division ====
1928–29 NHL records
Team	**BOS**	**CHI**	**DET**	**NYR**	**PIT**	**Total**
Boston	—	4–1–1	4–1–1	5–1	5–1	**18–4–2**
Chicago	1–4–1	—	1–4–1	0–4–2	2–3–1	**4–15–5**
Detroit	1–4–1	4–1–1	—	1–4–1	5–1	**11–10–3**
N.Y. Rangers	1–5	4–0–2	4–1–1	—	4–0–2	**13–6–5**
Pittsburgh	1–5	3–2–1	1–5	0–4–2	—	**5–16–3**

==== Vs. Canadian Division ====
1928–29 NHL records
Team	**MTL**	**MTM**	**NYA**	**OTT**	**TOR**	**Total**
Boston	1–2–1	3–1	0–3–1	2–1–1	2–2	**8–9–3**
Chicago	0–4	1–2–1	1–3	1–2–1	0–3–1	**3–14–3**
Detroit	1–1–2	2–1–1	2–1–1	1–1–2	2–2	**8–6–6**
N.Y. Rangers	1–1–2	0–3–1	1–1–2	3–1	3–1	**8–7–5**
Pittsburgh	0–2–2	1–2–1	2–2	0–3–1	1–2–1	**4–11–5**

== Schedule and results ==
1928–29 regular season
November: 4–1–1 (home: 2–1–0; road: 2–0–1)

Game	November	Opponent	Score	Record
1	15	@ Detroit Cougars	2–0	1–0–0
2	18	@ New York Americans	1 – 1 OT	1–0–1
3	20	Montreal Maroons	1–0	1–1–1
4	22	@ Chicago Black Hawks	2–1	2–1–1
5	25	Pittsburgh Pirates	2–0	3–1–1
6	29	Chicago Black Hawks	2 – 1 OT	4–1–1

December: 5–3–2 (home: 4–1–0; road: 1–2–2)

Game	December	Opponent	Score	Record
7	1	@ Montreal Maroons	3–0	4–2–1
8	4	@ Boston Bruins	2–0	4–3–1
9	6	@ Pittsburgh Pirates	0 – 0 OT	4–3–2
10	9	@ Detroit Cougars	2 – 2 OT	4–3–3
11	11	Toronto Maple Leafs	3–2	5–3–3
12	13	@ Montreal Canadiens	3 – 2 OT	6–3–3
13	16	Detroit Cougars	3–0	7–3–3
14	20	Ottawa Senators	1–0	8–3–3
15	25	New York Americans	1–0	8–4–3
16	30	Boston Bruins	2–0	9–4–3

January: 7–3–2 (home: 4–2–1; road: 3–1–1)

Game	January	Opponent	Score	Record
17	1	@ Toronto Maple Leafs	3–2	10–4–3
18	3	Pittsburgh Pirates	2 – 2 OT	10–4–4
19	6	@ New York Americans	0 – 0 OT	10–4–5
20	10	@ Ottawa Senators	9–3	11–4–5
21	13	Detroit Cougars	1–0	12–4–5
22	15	@ Boston Bruins	4–1	12–5–5
23	17	Chicago Black Hawks	1–0	13–5–5
24	19	@ Montreal Canadiens	0 – 0 OT	13–5–6
25	20	Montreal Canadiens	1–0	13–6–6
26	22	Toronto Maple Leafs	1–0	14–6–6
27	24	@ Pittsburgh Pirates	3–1	15–6–6
28	27	Boston Bruins	2–1	15–7–6
29	31	New York Americans	2–1	16–7–6

February: 3–4–3 (home: 2–1–2; road: 1–3–1)

Game	February	Opponent	Score	Record
30	3	@ Chicago Black Hawks	3–2	17–7–6
31	5	Montreal Maroons	1 – 1 OT	17–7–7
32	7	@ Ottawa Senators	2–1	17–8–7
33	10	Montreal Canadiens	3 – 3 OT	17–8–8
34	14	@ Toronto Maple Leafs	3–1	17–9–8
35	17	Pittsburgh Pirates	2–1	18–9–8
36	21	Detroit Cougars	1–0	18–10–8
37	23	@ Montreal Maroons	9–1	18–11–8
38	26	Ottawa Senators	2–0	19–11–8
39	28	@ Chicago Black Hawks	0 – 0 OT	19–11–9

March: 2–2–1 (home: 0–1–1; road: 2–1–0)

Game	March	Opponent	Score	Record
40	3	@ Detroit Cougars	3–2	20–11–9
41	5	@ Boston Bruins	2–1	20–12–9
42	10	Boston Bruins	3–2	20–13–9
43	14	Chicago Black Hawks	1 – 1 OT	20–13–10
44	17	@ Pittsburgh Pirates	4–3	21–13–10

Legend: Win (2 points) Loss (0 points) Tie (1 point)

== Playoffs ==
The playoffs were now between division finishers of each division, rather than a division champion from each division.

1929 Stanley Cup playoffs
Quarterfinals vs. (C2) New York Americans – Rangers win 1 goal to 0 goals

Game	Date	Visitor	Score	Home	OT	Series
1	March 19	New York Rangers	0–0	New York Americans	OT	Series tied 0 goals to 0 goals
2	March 21	New York Americans	0–1	New York Rangers	2OT	New York Rangers win series 1 goal to 0 goals

Semifinals vs. (C3) Toronto Maple Leafs – Rangers win 2–0

Game	Date	Visitor	Score	Home	OT	Series
1	March 24	Toronto Maple Leafs	0–1	New York Rangers		New York Rangers lead series 1–0
2	March 26	New York Rangers	2–1	Toronto Maple Leafs	OT	New York Rangers win series 2–0

Stanley Cup Finals vs. (A1) Boston Bruins – Bruins win 2–0

Game	Date	Visitor	Score	Home	OT	Series
1	March 28	New York Rangers	0–2	Boston Bruins		Boston leads series 1–0
2	March 29	Boston Bruins	2–1	New York Rangers		Boston wins series 2–0

Legend: Win Loss Tie

== Player statistics ==
Skaters

Regular season
Player	GP	G	A	Pts	PIM
Frank Boucher	44	10	16	26	8
Bill Cook	43	15	8	23	41
Frederick Cook	43	13	5	18	70
Paul Thompson	44	10	7	17	38
Murray Murdoch	44	8	6	14	18
Melville Keeling	43	6	3	9	35
Leo Bourgeault	44	2	3	5	59
Clarence Abel	33	3	1	4	41
Melville Vail	18	3	0	3	16
Russell Oatman^{†}	27	1	1	2	10
Myles Lane^{‡}	24	1	0	1	22
Ivan Johnson	9	0	0	0	14
Gerald Carson^{†}	10	0	0	0	5
Billy Boyd	11	0	0	0	5

Playoffs
Player	GP	G	A	Pts	PIM
Melville Keeling	6	3	0	3	2
Paul Thompson	6	0	2	2	6
Frederick Cook	6	1	0	1	12
Frank Boucher	6	1	0	1	0
Billy Boyd	1	0	0	0	0
Gerald Carson	4	0	0	0	0
Ivan Johnson	6	0	0	0	26
Leroy Goldsworthy	1	0	0	0	0
Ralph Taylor	1	0	0	0	0
Russell Oatman	4	0	0	0	0
Melville Vail	6	0	0	0	2
Clarence Abel	6	0	0	0	8
Leo Bourgeault	6	0	0	0	0
Murray Murdoch	6	0	0	0	2
Bill Cook	6	0	0	0	6

Goaltenders

Regular season
Player	GP	TOI	W	L	T	GA	GAA	SO
John Ross Roach	44	2760	21	13	10	65	1.41	13

Goaltenders

Playoffs
Player	GP	TOI	W	L	T	GA	GAA	SO
John Ross Roach	6	392	3	2	1	5	0.77	3

^{†}Denotes player spent time with another team before joining Rangers. Stats reflect time with Rangers only.
^{‡}Traded mid-season. Stats reflect time with Rangers only.

Note:

Pos = Position;GP = Games played; G = Goals; A = Assists; Pts = Points; PIM = Penalty minutes; +/- = Plus/minus; PPG = Power-play goals; SHG = Short-handed goals; GWG = Game-winning goals
Pos = Position;GP = Games played; Min, TOI = Minutes played; W = Wins; L = Losses; T,T/OT = Ties; OTL = Overtime losses; GA = Goals-against; GAA = Goals-against average; SO = Shutouts; SA = Shots against; SV = Shots saved;SV% = Save percentage;
