= Northwestern Ontario Sports Hall of Fame =

Sport museum in Thunder Bay, Ontario

Coordinates: 48.38180°N 89.24587°W

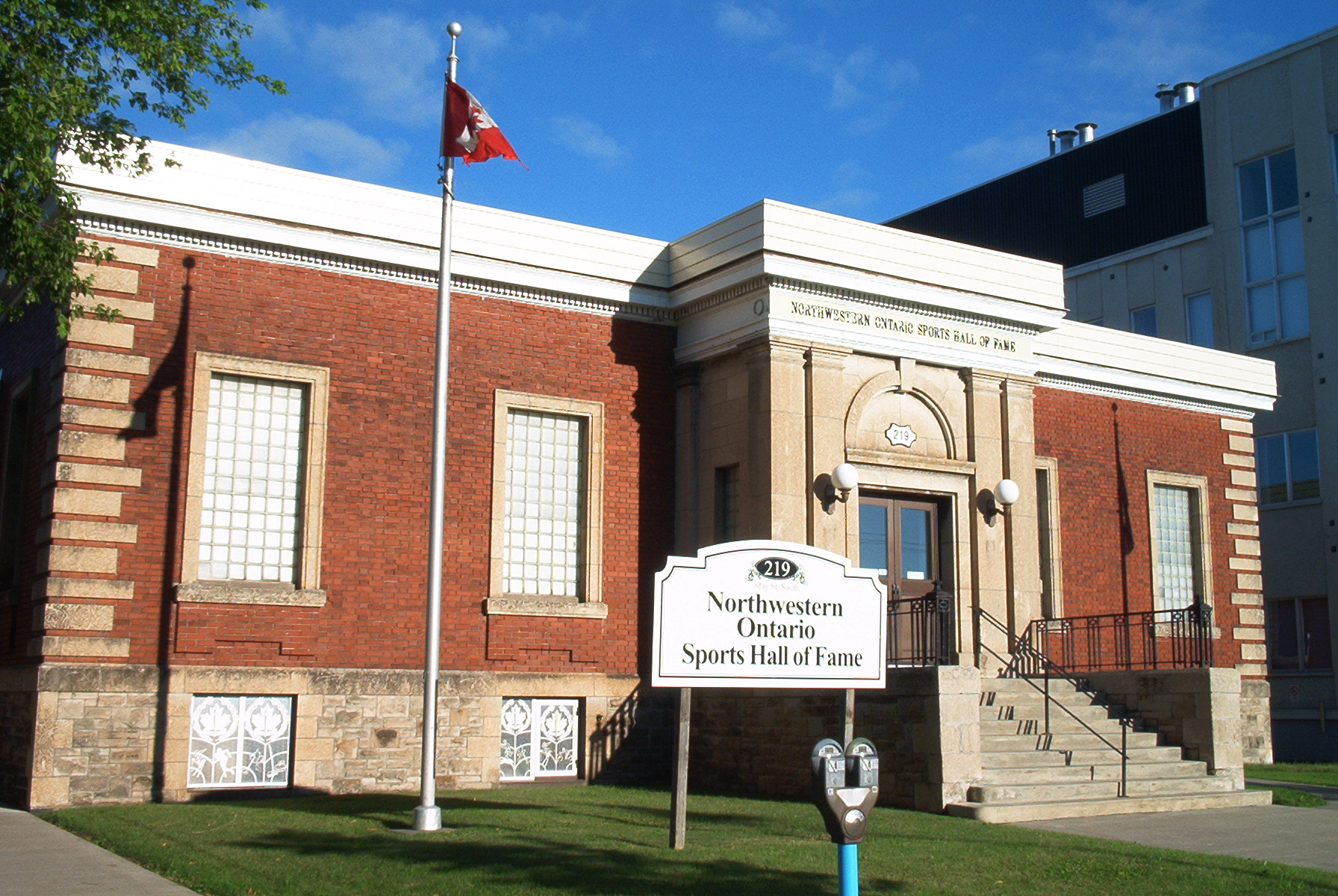
- Established: 1978
- Location: 219 South May Street, Thunder Bay, Ontario
- Type: Sports Museum
- Public transit access: Thunder Bay Transit via City Hall Terminal 1 3M 8 10 12 14 16 18 4 (limited)
- Website: Northwestern Ontario Sports Hall of Fame

The Northwestern Ontario Sports Hall of Fame, established in 1978 in Thunder Bay, Ontario, Canada, is dedicated to the people and teams of Northwestern Ontario who have achieved greatness in sport. It is located on 219 South May Street in Downtown Fort William.

== History ==
The Northwestern Ontario Sports Hall of Fame building was constructed in 1916 by Canadian architect Francis R. Heakes. It operated as the Fort William Land and Titles Building from 1917 to 1971, prior to the Hall of Fame moving there in 1996. Dave Siciliano has served as president of the Hall of Fame since 2016.

The museum includes memorabilia to showcase the history of Northwestern Ontario sports and its inductees, arranged in three exhibits: summer sports, winter sports, and inductees.

== Inductees ==
There are 330 inductees in the Northwestern Ontario Sports Hall of Fame as of 2025; including 184 athletes, 95 builders, and 51 teams. There have been 42 induction ceremonies.

=== Athletes ===
- Jack Adams (1894–1968), professional ice hockey player, coach, and executive in the National Hockey League and Pacific Coast Hockey Association
- John Adams (born 1946), professional ice hockey goaltender in the National Hockey League
- Henry Åkervall (1937–2000), represented Canada in ice hockey at the 1964 Winter Olympics
- Tom Alexander (born 1958), represented Canada in swimming at the 1976 Summer Olympics
- Mike Allison (born 1961), professional ice hockey player in the National Hockey League
- Pete Backor (1919–1988), professional ice hockey player in the National Hockey League
- Joann Baker (born 1960), represented Canada in swimming at the 1976 Summer Olympics
- Stan Baluik (born 1935), professional ice hockey player and golfer
- Cliff Barton (1907–1969), professional ice hockey player in the National Hockey League
- Gary Bergman (1938–2000), professional ice hockey player in the National Hockey League
- Steve Black (1927–2008), professional ice hockey player in the National Hockey League
- Gus Bodnar (1923–2005), professional ice hockey player in the National Hockey League
- Barton Bradley (1930–2006), professional ice hockey player in the National Hockey League
- Rick Bragnalo (born 1951), professional ice hockey player in the National Hockey League
- Mike Busniuk (born 1951), professional ice hockey player in the National Hockey League
- Ron Busniuk (1948–2024), professional ice hockey player in the National Hockey League and World Hockey Association
- Larry Cahan (1933–1992), professional ice hockey player in the National Hockey League and World Hockey Association
- Marc Chorney (born 1959), professional ice hockey player in the National Hockey League
- Keith Christiansen (1944–2018), professional ice hockey player in the World Hockey Association
- Debbie Clarke (born 1961), represented Canada in swimming at the 1976 Summer Olympics
- Andrea Cole (born 1984), paralympic swimmer competing at the 2000, 2004, and 2008 events
- Steve Collins (born 1964), represented Canada in World Cup ski jumping
- Tom Cook (1907–1961), professional ice hockey player in the National Hockey League
- John Coward (1907–1989), represented Great Britain in ice hockey at the 1936 Winter Olympics
- Danny Cox (1903–1982), professional ice hockey player in the National Hockey League
- Dave Creighton (1930–2017), professional ice hockey player in the National Hockey League
- Sean Crooks (born 1983), represented Canada in Nordic skiing at the 2006 Winter Olympics
- Steve Daniar (born 1955), represented Canada in wrestling at the 1976 Summer Olympics
- Mary DePiero (born 1968), represented Canada in diving at the 1990 and 1994 Commonwealth Games
- Alex Delvecchio (1931–2025), professional ice hockey player in the National Hockey League
- Don Domansky (born 1946), represented Canada in track and field at the 1968 and 1976 Summer Olympics
- Noel Dunford (born 1939), professional football player in the Canadian Football League
- Domenic Figliomeni (born 1969), represented Canada in boxing at the 1992 and 1996 Summer Olympics
- Lee Fogolin (born 1955), professional ice hockey player in the National Hockey League
- Lee Fogolin Sr. (1927–2000), professional ice hockey player in the National Hockey League
- John Gallagher (1909–1981), professional ice hockey player in the National Hockey League
- Bruce Gamble (1938–1982), professional ice hockey player in the National Hockey League
- Dave Gatherum (1932–2024), professional ice hockey player in the National Hockey League
- Pete Goegan (1934–2008), professional ice hockey player in the National Hockey League
- Sandra Greaves (born 1963), represented Canada in judo at the Pan American Games
- Si Griffis (1883–1950), early ice hockey player and Hockey Hall of Fame inductee
- Al Hackner (born 1954), represented Canada in curling at the World Championships
- Tom Hainey (born 1965), represented Canada in swimming at the 1988 Paralympics
- Curt Harnett (born 1965), represented Canada in cycling at the 1994, 1992, and 1996 Summer Olympics
- Jeff Heath (1915–1975), professional baseball player in Major League Baseball
- Tom Hooper (1883–1960), early ice hockey player and Hockey Hall of Fame inductee
- Bill Houlder (born 1967), professional ice hockey player in the National Hockey League
- Tony Hrkac (born 1966), professional ice hockey player in the National Hockey League
- Dave Irwin (born 1954), represented Canada in skiing at the 1976 and 1980 Winter Olympic Games
- Haley Irwin (born 1988), professional ice hockey player Canadian Women's Hockey League
- Bud Jarvis (1907–1983), professional ice hockey player in the National Hockey League
- Roger Jenkins (1911–1994), professional ice hockey player in the National Hockey League
- Trevor Johansen (born 1957), professional ice hockey player in the National Hockey League
- Greg Johnson (1971–2019), professional ice hockey player in the National Hockey League
- Eddie Kachur (1934–2014), professional ice hockey player in the National Hockey League
- Fred Kearney (1897–1998), professional ice hockey player in the American Hockey Association
- J. Bob Kelly (born 1946), professional ice hockey player in the National Hockey League
- Ed Kryzanowski (1925–2007), professional ice hockey player in the National Hockey League
- Suzanne Kwasny (born 1962), represented Canada in swimming at the 1978 Commonwealth Games
- Frank Landy (born 1950), professional football player in the Canadian Football League
- Edgar Laprade (1919–2014), professional ice hockey player in the National Hockey League
- Danny Lewicki (1931–2018), professional ice hockey player in the National Hockey League
- Chris Lindberg (born 1967), professional ice hockey player in the National Hockey League
- Vic Lindquist (1908–1983), represented Canada in ice hockey at the 1932 Winter Olympics
- John Lockyer, represented Canada in ski jumping at the World Championships
- Pentti Lund (1925–2013), professional ice hockey player in the National Hockey League
- Norm Maciver (born 1964), professional ice hockey player in the National Hockey League
- Murdo MacKay (1916–2000), professional ice hockey player in the National Hockey League
- Calum MacKay (1927–2001), professional ice hockey player in the National Hockey League
- Connie Madigan (1934–2024), professional ice hockey player in the National Hockey League
- Lou Marcon (1935–2023), professional ice hockey player in the National Hockey League
- Mike McEwen (born 1956), professional ice hockey player in the National Hockey League
- Billy McGimsie (1880–1968), early ice hockey player and Hockey Hall of Fame inductee
- Charley McVeigh (1898–1984), professional ice hockey player in the National Hockey League
- Rudy Migay (1928–2016), professional ice hockey player in the National Hockey League
- Jay Miron (born 1970), represented Canada in BMX competitions at the X Games
- Wayne Muloin (born 1941), professional ice hockey player in the National Hockey League and World Hockey Association
- Jason Myslicki (born 1977), represented Canada in Nordic skiing at the 2006 and 2010 Winter Olympics
- Jason Napper, represented Canada in diving at the 1994 Commonwealth Games
- Jeff Nicklin (1914–1945), amateur football player killed serving with the Canadian Army in World War II
- Dennis Olson (1934–2021), professional ice hockey player in the National Hockey League
- Dennis Owchar (born 1953), professional ice hockey player in the National Hockey League
- Ryan Parent (born 1987), professional ice hockey player in the National Hockey League
- Liam Parsons (born 1977), represented Canada in rowing at the 2008 Summer Olympics
- Amber Peterson (born 1982), represented Canada in freestyle skiing at the 2006 Winter Olympics
- Tommy Phillips (1883–1923), early ice hockey player and Hockey Hall of Fame inductee
- Walt Poddubny (1960-2009), professional ice hockey player in the National Hockey League
- Bud Poile (1924–2005), professional ice hockey player in the National Hockey League
- Chris Pronger (born 1974), professional ice hockey player in the National Hockey League
- Sean Pronger (born 1972), professional ice hockey player in the National Hockey League
- Nelson Pyatt (born 1953), professional ice hockey player in the National Hockey League and World Hockey Association
- Taylor Pyatt (born 1981), professional ice hockey player in the National Hockey League
- Brian Renken (born 1955), represented Canada in wrestling at the 1976 Summer Olympics
- Andy Ritchie (born 1955), represented Canada in swimming at the 1976 Summer Olympics
- Charlie Sands (1911–1953), professional ice hockey player in the National Hockey League
- George Saunders (born 1949), represented Canada in wrestling at the 1972 Summer Olympics
- Bill Sawchuk (born 1959), represented Canada in swimming at the 1976 Summer Olympics
- John Schella (1947–2018), professional ice hockey player in the National Hockey League and World Hockey Association
- Ron Schock (born 1943), professional ice hockey player in the National Hockey League
- Charlie Simmer (born 1954), professional ice hockey player in the National Hockey League
- Mike Smith (born 1967), represented Canada in decathlon at the 1988, 1992, and 1996 Summer Olympics
- Rick St. Croix (born 1955), professional ice hockey player in the National Hockey League
- Trevor Stewardson (born 1977), represented Canada in boxing at the 2004 Summer Olympics
- Gaye Stewart (1923-2010), professional ice hockey player in the National Hockey League
- Ralph Stewart (born 1948), professional ice hockey player in the National Hockey League
- Joe Szura (1938-2006), professional ice hockey player in the National Hockey League and World Hockey Association
- Vic Venasky (born 1951), professional ice hockey player in the National Hockey League
- Gary Veneruzzo (born 1943), professional ice hockey player in the National Hockey League and World Hockey Association
- Jack Walker (1888–1950), early ice hockey player and Hockey Hall of Fame inductee
- Jimmy Ward (1906-1990), professional ice hockey player in the National Hockey League
- Katie Weatherston (born 1983), represented Canada in ice hockey at the 2006 Winter Olympics
- Robbi Weldon (born 1975), multi-sport Paralympian in 2010, 2012, and 2014
- Gord Wilson (1932–2023), professional ice hockey player in the National Hockey League
- Phat Wilson (1895–1970), senior ice hockey player and Hockey Hall of Fame inductee
- Kris Wirtz (born 1969), represented Canada in figure skating at the 1994 and 1998 Winter Olympics
- Wyatt Wishart, represented Canada in wrestling at the 1978 and 1982 Commonwealth Games
- Benny Woit (1928–2016), professional ice hockey player in the National Hockey League

=== Builders ===
- Dave Allison (born 1959), junior ice hockey and National Hockey League coach
- Art Berglund (1940–2020), Lester Patrick Trophy recipient and International Ice Hockey Hall of Fame inductee
- Alex Dampier (born 1951), professional ice hockey coach and British Ice Hockey Hall of Fame inductee
- John Gasparini (born 1945), university ice hockey coach and United States Hockey League president
- George Gwozdecky (born 1953), university and professional ice hockey coach
- Mickey Hennessy (1915–1991), ice hockey coach, politician, Olympic boxer
- Jamie Kompon (born 1966), professional ice hockey coach
- Bob McCammon (1941–2021), professional ice hockey coach
- Fred Page (1915–1997), president of the Canadian Amateur Hockey Association and vice-president of the International Ice Hockey Federation, inducted into the Hockey Hall of Fame
- Bob Peters (1937–2021), university ice hockey coach
- Albert Pudas (1899–1976), ice hockey player, coach, and referee
- Reijo Puiras (1952–2017), skiing coach and Olympian
- Frank Sargent (1902–1988), president of the Canadian Amateur Hockey Association and Dominion Curling Association, inducted into the Canadian Curling Hall of Fame
- Bill Salonen (1935–2025), ice hockey coach and administrator of the Superior International Junior Hockey League
- Bill Selman (born 1939), university and professional ice hockey coach
- Dave Siciliano (born 1946), junior and collegiate ice hockey coach, Lakehead University athletic director
- Vern Stenlund (born 1956), university and professional ice hockey coach
- Joe Wirkkunen (1928–1986), Finnish-Canadian coach of the Finland men's national ice hockey team
- Paul Wirtz (1958–2006), figure skating coach

=== Teams ===
- 1907 Kenora Thistles, semi-professional ice hockey team and winners of two Stanley Cup challenges
- 1922 Fort William War Veterans, junior ice hockey team and 1922 Memorial Cup champions
- 1925 Port Arthur Bearcats, senior ice hockey team and 1925 Allan Cup champions
- 1926 Port Arthur Bearcats, senior ice hockey team and 1926 Allan Cup champions
- 1929 Port Arthur Bearcats, senior ice hockey team and 1929 Allan Cup champions
- 1936 Port Arthur Bearcats, senior ice hockey team, 1936 Allan Cup champions, and represented Canada in ice hockey at the 1936 Winter Olympics
- 1939 Port Arthur Bearcats, senior ice hockey team and 1939 Allan Cup champions
- 1948 Port Arthur West End Bruins, junior ice hockey team and 1948 Memorial Cup champions
- 1952 Fort Frances Canadians, senior ice hockey team and 1952 Allan Cup champions
- 1953 Kenora Thistles, intermediate ice hockey team and 1953 Edmonton Journal Trophy champions, and represeneted Canada on a goodwill tour of Japan in 1954
- 1962 Port Arthur Bearcats, senior ice hockey team, and represented Canada in a European exhibition game tour
- 1975 Thunder Bay Twins, senior ice hockey team and 1975 Allan Cup champions
- 1984 Thunder Bay Twins, senior ice hockey team and 1984 Allan Cup champions
- 1985 Thunder Bay Twins, senior ice hockey team and 1985 Allan Cup champions
- 1988 Thunder Bay Twins, senior ice hockey team and 1988 Allan Cup champions
- 1989 Thunder Bay Flyers, junior ice hockey team and 1989 Centennial Cup champions
- 1992 Thunder Bay Flyers, junior ice hockey team and 1992 Centennial Cup champions
