= List of NHL players (W) =

This is a list of National Hockey League (NHL) players who have played at least one game in the NHL from 1917 to present and have a last name that starts with "W".

List updated as of the 2018–19 NHL season.

== Wa ==
- Don Waddell
- Austin Wagner
- Chris Wagner
- Steven Wagner
- Oliver Wahlstrom
- Frank "Deacon" Waite
- Jimmy Waite
- Darcy Wakaluk
- Ernie Wakely
- Gordie Walker
- Howard Walker
- Jack Walker
- Kurt Walker
- Matt Walker
- Nathan Walker
- Russ Walker
- Sammy Walker
- Scott Walker
- Sean Walker
- Bob Wall
- Michael Wall
- Tim Wallace
- Jesse Wallin
- Niclas Wallin
- Peter Wallin
- Rickard Wallin
- Lucas Wallmark
- Jesper Wallstedt
- Jake Walman
- Derrick Walser
- James "Flat" Walsh
- Jim Walsh
- Mike Walsh
- Reilly Walsh
- Ben Walter
- Ryan Walter
- Bob Walton
- Mike Walton
- Wes Walz
- Rick Wamsley
- Tom Wandell
- Kyle Wanvig
- Gord Wappel
- Aaron Ward
- Cam Ward
- Dixon Ward
- Don Ward
- Ed Ward
- Jason Ward
- Jimmy Ward
- Joe Ward
- Joel Ward
- Lance Ward
- Ron Ward
- Jeff Ware
- Mike Ware
- Eddie Wares
- Bob Warner
- Jim Warner
- Rhett Warrener
- Todd Warriner
- David Warsofsky
- Bill Warwick
- Grant Warwick
- Steve Washburn
- Nick Wasnie
- Francis Wathier
- Austin Watson
- Bill Watson
- Bryan Watson
- Dave Watson
- Harry Watson
- Jim Watson
- Jimmy Watson
- Joe Watson
- Phil Watson
- Jim Watt
- Mike Watt
- Tim Watters
- Brian Watts

== We–Wh ==
- Jordan Weal
- Jasper Weatherby
- Mike Weaver
- Steve Webb
- Mike Weber
- Shea Weber
- Yannick Weber
- Aubrey Webster
- Don Webster
- John "Chick" Webster
- Tom Webster
- Scott Wedgewood
- Anton Wedin
- MacKenzie Weegar
- Kevin Weekes
- Steve Weeks
- Doug Weight
- Cooney Weiland
- Mattias Weinhandl
- Eric Weinrich
- Stan Weir
- Wally Weir
- Dale Weise
- Stephen Weiss
- Noah Welch
- Andy Welinski
- Alexander Wellington
- Craig Weller
- Casey Wellman
- Chris Wells
- Dylan Wells
- Jay Wells
- Eric Wellwood
- Kyle Wellwood
- Jeremy Welsh
- Alexander Wennberg
- John Wensink
- Marvin Wentworth
- Brad Werenka
- Zach Werenski
- Adam Werner
- Brian Wesenberg
- Blake Wesley
- Glen Wesley
- Duvie Westcott
- Ed Westfall
- Kevin Westgarth
- Tommy Westlund
- Erik Westrum
- Carl Wetzel
- Ken Wharram
- Len Wharton
- Simon Wheeldon
- Blake Wheeler
- Don Wheldon
- Bill Whelton
- Rob Whistle
- Bill White
- Brian White
- Colin White (born 1977)
- Colin White (born 1997)
- Colton White
- Ian White
- Moe White
- Peter White
- Ryan White
- Sherman White
- Todd White
- Tony White
- Wilfred "Tex" White
- Zach Whitecloud
- Bob Whitelaw
- Trent Whitfield
- Bob Whitlock
- Kay Whitmore
- Joe Whitney
- Ray Whitney
- Ryan Whitney
- Sean Whyte

== Wic–Wil ==
- Roman Wick
- Doug Wickenheiser
- Chris Wideman
- Dennis Wideman
- Juha Widing
- Jason Widmer
- Art Wiebe
- Jason Wiemer
- Jim Wiemer
- Patrick Wiercioch
- Adam Wilcox
- Archie Wilcox
- Barry Wilcox
- Archie Wilder
- Jim Wiley
- Bob Wilkie
- David Wilkie
- Barry Wilkins
- Derek Wilkinson
- John Wilkinson
- Neil Wilkinson
- Brian Wilks
- Roman Will
- Rod Willard
- Burr Williams
- Darryl Williams
- David Williams
- Fred Williams
- Gord Williams
- Jason Williams
- Jeremy Williams
- Justin Williams
- Sean Williams
- Tiger Williams
- Tom Williams (born 1940)
- Tom Williams (born 1951)
- Warren "Butch" Williams
- Jordan Willis
- Shane Willis
- Max Willman
- Brian Willsie
- Don Willson
- Clarke Wilm
- Behn Wilson
- Bert Wilson
- Bob Wilson
- Carey Wilson
- Clay Wilson
- Colin Wilson
- Cully Wilson
- Doug Wilson
- Dunc Wilson
- Garrett Wilson
- Gord Wilson
- Hub Wilson
- Jerry Wilson
- Johnny Wilson
- Kyle Wilson
- Landon Wilson
- Larry Wilson
- Mike Wilson
- Mitch Wilson
- Murray Wilson
- Rick Wilson
- Rik Wilson
- Roger Wilson
- Ron Wilson (born 1955)
- Ron Wilson (born 1956)
- Ross Wilson
- Ryan Wilson
- Scott Wilson
- Tom Wilson
- Wally Wilson

== Win–Wy ==
- Brad Winchester
- Jesse Winchester
- Murray Wing
- Tommy Wingels
- Hal Winkler
- Chris Winnes
- Daniel Winnik
- Ryan Winterton
- Brian Wiseman
- Chad Wiseman
- Eddie Wiseman
- Ty Wishart
- James Wisniewski
- Jim Wiste
- Johan Witehall
- Jim Witherspoon
- Steve Witiuk
- Luke Witkowski
- Brendan Witt
- Steve Wochy
- Benny Woit
- Christian Wolanin
- Craig Wolanin
- Bennett Wolf
- David Wolf
- Dustin Wolf
- Bernie Wolfe
- Joseph Woll
- Wojtek Wolski
- Mike Wong
- Bob Wood
- Dody Wood
- Miles Wood
- Randy Wood
- Dan Woodley
- Alex Wood
- Brendan Woods
- Paul Woods
- Jason Woolley
- Peter Worrell
- Lorne "Gump" Worsley
- Roy Worters
- Chris Worthy
- Kevin Wortman
- Parker Wotherspoon
- Tyler Wotherspoon
- Mark Wotton
- Bob Woytowich
- Jeff Woywitka
- Andy Wozniewski
- Ken Wregget
- Bob Wren
- James Wright
- Jamie Wright
- John Wright
- Keith Wright
- Larry Wright
- Shane Wright
- Tyler Wright
- Ralph Wycherley
- Bill Wylie
- Duane Wylie
- James Wyman
- Randy Wyrozub

== See also ==
- hockeydb.com NHL Player List - W
