= Herman Murray =

Canadian ice hockey player

- Born: December 5, 1909 Montreal, Quebec, Canada
- Died: November 27, 1998 (aged 88)
- Height: 6 ft 1 in (185 cm)
- Weight: 180 lb (82 kg; 12 st 12 lb)
- Position: Defence
- Shot: Left
- Played for: Montreal Victorias; Montreal Royals; Port Arthur Bearcats
- National team: Canada
- Playing career: 1930–1940

Olympic medal record

Men's Ice hockey
Silver medal – second place	1936 Garmisch-Partenkirchen	Team competition

Herman Edward Murray (December 5, 1909 – November 27, 1998) was a Canadian ice hockey player who competed in the 1936 Winter Olympics.

Murray was the Captain of the 1936 Port Arthur Bearcats, which won the silver medal for Canada in ice hockey at the 1936 Winter Olympics. He scored five goals in eight matches at that tournament. Following the Olympics, Murray finished his playing career with the Royal Montreal Hockey Club, and was a member of that team when it won the 1939 Allan Cup.

In 1987 he was inducted into the Northwestern Ontario Sports Hall of Fame as a member of the 1936 Olympic team.
