= Gord Kuhn =

Canadian ice hockey player

- Born: November 19, 1905; Truro, Nova Scotia, Canada
- Died: July 29, 1978 (aged 72)
- Height: 5 ft 7 in (170 cm)
- Weight: 145 lb (66 kg; 10 st 5 lb)
- Position: Right Wing
- Shot: Right
- Played for: New York Americans
- Playing career: 1924–1940

Gordon Frederick "Doggie" Kuhn (November 19, 1905 — July 29, 1978) was a Canadian professional ice hockey player who played nine games in the National Hockey League with the New York Americans during the 1932–33 season. The rest of his career, which lasted from 1924 to 1940, was spent in various minor leagues.

Kuhn was born in Truro, Nova Scotia.

== Career statistics ==
=== Regular season and playoffs ===
			Regular season					Playoffs
Season	Team	League	GP	G	A	Pts	PIM	GP	G	A	Pts	PIM
1924–25	Truro Bearcats	NSSHL	8	15	0	15	—	1	0	0	0	2
1924–25	Truro Bearcats	Al-Cup	—	—	—	—	—	6	2	2	4	2
1925–26	Truro Bearcats	NSSHL	—	—	—	—	—	—	—	—	—	—
1926–27	Windsor Maple Leafs	NSSHL	10	5	4	9	2	9	6	4	10	2
1927–28	Truro Bearcats	NSSHL	11	10	7	17	8	2	1	0	1	2
1928–29	Halifax Wolverines	HSrHL	12	13	3	16	25	2	3	1	4	2
1928–29	Halifax Wolverines	Al-Cup	—	—	—	—	—	8	9	5	14	4
1929–30	Truro Bearcats	NSSHL	17	14	5	19	39	2	1	0	1	4
1929–30	Truro Bearcats	Al-Cup	—	—	—	—	—	8	11	1	12	2
1930–31	New Haven Eagles	Can-Am	36	5	5	10	48	—	—	—	—	—
1931–32	New Haven Eagles	Can-Am	40	16	6	22	52	—	—	—	—	—
1932–33	New York Americans	NHL	9	1	1	2	4	—	—	—	—	—
1932–33	New Haven Eagles	Can-Am	29	5	6	11	39	2	0	0	0	2
1933–34	Buffalo Bisons	IHL	36	4	5	9	20	6	1	0	1	20
1934–35	Providence Reds	Can-Am	46	13	22	35	26	6	0	1	1	6
1935–36	Providence Reds	Can-Am	46	8	9	17	47	7	2	2	4	10
1936–37	Providence Reds	IAHL	48	17	13	30	34	3	1	1	2	7
1937–38	Providence Reds	IAHL	48	9	18	27	44	7	0	4	4	4
1938–39	Providence Reds	IAHL	52	13	9	22	13	5	0	2	2	0
1939–40	Syracuse Stars	IAHL	47	4	9	13	11	—	—	—	—	—
Can-Am totals			197	47	48	95	212	15	2	3	5	18
IAHL totals			195	43	49	92	102	15	1	7	8	11
NHL totals			9	1	1	2	4	—	—	—	—	—
