= Bob Connors =

Scottish-born Canadian ice hockey player

- Born: October 19, 1902 Edinburgh, Scotland, GBR
- Died: July 27, 1931 (aged 28) Port Arthur, Ontario, Canada
- Height: 5 ft 9 in (175 cm)
- Weight: 165 lb (75 kg; 11 st 11 lb)
- Position: Left wing
- Shot: Left
- Played for: New York Americans; Detroit Cougars
- Playing career: 1926–1931

Robert Allan Connors (October 19, 1902 – July 27, 1931) was a Canadian professional ice hockey left winger and defenceman who played 78 games in the National Hockey League between 1926 and 1930. He played with the Detroit Cougars and New York Americans. He was born in Edinburgh, Scotland, United Kingdom and raised in Port Arthur, Ontario.

Connors died in the summer of 1931 due to a broken neck, caused by diving into shallow waters near Port Arthur, Ontario.

== Career statistics ==
=== Regular season and playoffs ===
			Regular season					Playoffs
Season	Team	League	GP	G	A	Pts	PIM	GP	G	A	Pts	PIM
1921–22	Grand'Mere Maroons	QPHL	3	0	0	0	0	—	—	—	—	—
1922–23	Iroquois Falls Papermakers	NOJHA	—	—	—	—	—	—	—	—	—	—
1923–24	Port Arthur Seniors	TBSHL	16	4	1	5	5	2	0	0	0	0
1924–25	Port Arthur Seniors	TBSHL	15	3	0	3	—	—	—	—	—	—
1924–25	Port Arthur Seniors	Al-Cup	—	—	—	—	—	9	1	0	1	2
1925–26	Niagara Falls Cataracts	OHA Sr	18	12	6	18	26	—	—	—	—	—
1926–27	Niagara Falls Cataracts	Can-Pro	17	6	2	8	31	—	—	—	—	—
1926–27	New York Americans	NHL	6	1	0	1	0	—	—	—	—	—
1927–28	Detroit Olympics	Can-Pro	38	14	10	24	131	2	0	0	0	6
1928–29	Detroit Cougars	NHL	41	13	3	16	68	2	0	0	0	10
1929–30	Detroit Cougars	NHL	31	3	7	10	42	—	—	—	—	—
1929–30	Detroit Olympics	IHL	15	9	5	14	29	3	1	0	1	13
1930–31	Seattle Eskimos	PCHL	27	9	1	10	88	—	—	—	—	—
NHL totals			78	17	10	27	110	2	0	0	0	10
