= Alexander Sinclair =

Canadian ice hockey player

Olympic medal record

Men's Ice hockey
Silver medal – second place	1936 Garmisch-Partenkirchen	Team competition

Alexander George Sinclair (June 28, 1911 – October 2, 2002) was a Canadian ice hockey player who competed in the 1936 Winter Olympics.

Sinclair was a member of the 1936 Port Arthur Bearcats, which won the silver medal for Canada in ice hockey at the 1936 Winter Olympics. In 1987 he was inducted into the Northwestern Ontario Sports Hall of Fame as a member of that Olympic team.
