= Kenneth Farmer =

Canadian ice hockey player and businessman (1912–2005)

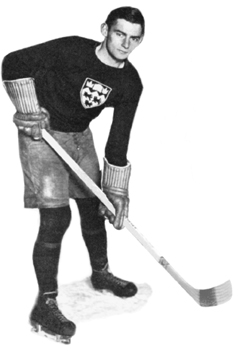
- Ken Farmer in McGill Redmen uniform
- Born: July 26, 1912; Westmount, Quebec, Canada
- Died: January 12, 2005 (aged 92)
- Occupations: accountant, ice hockey player, administrator, soldier
- Known for: President of Canadian Olympic Association, Olympic silver medal winner
Ice hockey career
- Played for: McGill Redmen; Montreal Victorias; Port Arthur Bearcats
- Playing career: 1930–1939
Medal record
Men's Ice Hockey
| Silver medal – second place | 1936 Garmisch-Partenkirchen | Team |

Kenneth Pentin Farmer, CM (July 26, 1912 – January 12, 2005) was a Canadian ice hockey player and businessman. He won a Winter Olympics silver medal winner in ice hockey, served as president of the Canadian Olympic Association, and worked as a chartered accountant.

== Background ==
Born in Westmount, Quebec, he received a Bachelor of Commerce degree from McGill University. In 1934 he joined the accounting firm of McDonald Currie & Company (now Coopers & Lybrand) and became a Chartered Accountant in 1937. He became a partner in 1945 until his retirement in 1977.

Farmer was an outstanding hockey player. He was a member of the 1936 Port Arthur Bearcats, which won the silver medal for Canada in ice hockey at the 1936 Winter Olympics. He had the second-highest points at the Olympics with 10 goals and four assists. Canada had been expected to win the gold medal, but several incidents led to winning the silver medal instead. After the Olympics, Farmer stated that none of Canada's officials knew what playoff system was being used and that E. A. Gilroy and Fred Marples "were blissfully unaware of what it was all about".

During World War II, he served with The Royal Montreal Regiment and the Manitoba Dragoons. He was discharged with the rank of Major and was Mentioned in Dispatches in 1945.

From 1953 to 1961, he was the President of the Canadian Olympic Association. He was President of the Commonwealth Games Association of Canada from 1977 to 1983. He was a Governor of Canada's Sports Hall of Fame from 1980 to 1990.

== Honours ==
- 1971, inducted into the Canadian Olympic Hall of Fame in 1971
- 1981, made a Member of the Order of Canada
- 1987, inducted into the Northwestern Ontario Sports Hall of Fame as a member of the 1936 Olympic team
- 1999, inducted to the McGill University Sports Hall of Fame

== Sources ==
- "Canadian Who's Who 1997 entry". University of Toronto Press.
- "OBIT: Olympian Ken Farmer dies at 92". McGill University. Archived from the original on May 3, 2006.
- "OBIT: Ken Farmer, oldest surviving Redmen player". McGill University. Archived from the original on May 3, 2006.
