= Port Arthur Bearcats =

Former senior ice hockey team in Ontario

Medal record

Representing Canada

Men's ice hockey

Olympic Games/World Championship
Silver medal – second place	1936 Garmisch-Partenkirchen	Team

The Port Arthur Bearcats (Bear Cats) were a senior amateur ice hockey team based in Port Arthur, Ontario, Canada – now part of the city of Thunder Bay – from the early 1900s until 1970. Before settling on the nickname of Bearcats, the Port Arthur team played several seasons with unofficial generic names applied by fans and sportswriters, such as the Port Arthur Ports, Port Arthur Hockey Club, and the Port Arthur Seniors.

== History ==
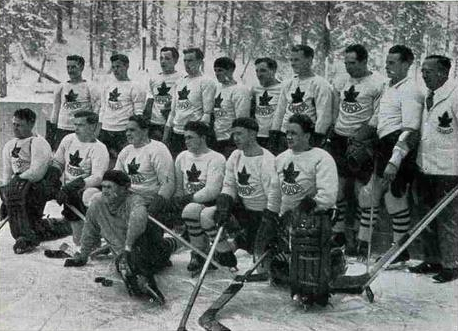
Canada men's national ice hockey team photo at the 1936 Winter Olympics

Port Arthur played the Ottawa Senators for the Stanley Cup in a 1911 challenge, losing 13–4 in a one-game showdown on March 16, 1911.

By 1915 the Port Arthur was playing in the Thunder Bay Senior A Hockey League (TBSHL). Port Arthur is located in western portion of Ontario, the Bearcats found it convenient to play in the Manitoba Senior A Hockey League (MSHL, MTBSHL) at various times during its history. The Bearcats have also played seasons in the Port Arthur Senior Hockey League (PSHL) and the International Amateur Hockey League (IAHL).

The Bearcats were amongst the best Senior-A teams in Canada, playing in the national Allan Cup championship finals seven times from 1925 through 1942, winning the 1925, 1926, 1929 and 1939 Allan Cup championships. During years that the Allan Cup was an East versus West competition, the Bearcats played as the representative from Western Canada.

After the 1935 Allan Cup champion Halifax Wolverines disbanded, the Canadian Amateur Hockey Association (CAHA) chose the runner-up Bearcats to be Canada's representative at the 1936 Winter Olympics in Garmisch-Partenkirchen, Germany. The Bearcats won the silver medal for Canada. The team remained on an exhibition tour in Europe after the Olympics and returned late to Canada. CAHA president E. A. Gilroy upheld the ruling by W. G. Hardy to exclude the team from the 1936 Allan Cup playoffs.

The Bearcats were chosen to represent Canada at the 1940 Winter Olympics, and CAHA vice-president Frank Sargent was placed in charge of the upcoming tour of Europe. The CAHA approved C$5,000 towards travel expenses, and the team would receive any profits from exhibition games played while in Europe. The Bearcats requested a guarantee from the CAHA against financial loss, and Sargent expected a meeting to decide on the travel demands. The 1940 Winter Olympics were ultimately cancelled after the German invasion of Poland in September 1939.

The team suspended operation in 1943 and 1944, due to World War II. The Bearcats returned in the 1945–46 season, continuing operation until the merger of the cities of Port Arthur and Fort William, with the Fort William Beavers joining the Bearcats to form the Thunder Bay Twins for the 1970–71 season. This new iteration would appear in six more Allan Cup finals, including five Allan Cup wins. This team folded after finishing as runner-up in the 1991 Allan Cup.

The Bearcats and the successor Twins combined for 13 Allan Cup competitions, winning a combined 9 championships.

The 1936 Olympic silver medalist Bearcats team was inducted into the Northwestern Ontario Sports Hall of Fame in 1987.

In the winter of 1961–62, the Bearcats represented Canada in a European exhibition game tour, facilitated by Fred Page.

== Notable players ==
=== 1936 Olympic team roster ===
- Maxwell Deacon
- Hugh Farguharson
- Kenneth Farmer-Horn
- James Haggarty
- Walter Kitchen
- Raymond Milton
- Francis Moore
- Herman Murray
- Arthur Nash
- David Neville
- Alexander Sinclair
- Ralph St. Germain
- Bill Thomson

=== NHL alumni ===
Thirty-one alumni from the Port Arthur Bearcats/Ports/Hockey Club/Seniors/Bear Cats played in the National Hockey League:

- Cliff Barton, Bart Bradley, Bill Brydge, Marty Burke, Harry Cameron, Eddie Carpenter, Lorne Chabot, Art Chapman, Bob Connors, Danny Cox, Jimmy Creighton, Gus Forslund, Gord Fraser, Alex Gray, Jim Haggarty, Steve Hrymnak, James Jarvis, Dick Kotanen, Edgar Laprade, Norm Larson, Jim McLeod, Rudy Migay, Frank Nighbor, Bud Poile, Albert Pudas, Charlie Sands, Red Spooner, Butch Stahan, Bill Thomson, Jack Walker, Alex Wellington, Gord Wilson, Steve Wojciechowski, Benny Woit

== Season-by-season standings ==
Season	GP	W	L	T	OTL	GF	GA	P	Results
1915–16	8	4	4	0	-	--	--	8	2nd TBSHL
1916–17 to 1921–22	Statistics Not Available								
1922–23	16	11	5	0	-	95	57	22	2nd MSHL
1923–24	15	11	4	0	-	--	--	16	3rd MTBSHL
1924–25	19	12	7	0	-	--	--	24	2nd MTBSHL, Allan Cup champion
1925–26	20	14	6	0	-	--	--	28	1st TBSHL, Allan Cup champion
1926–27	20	10	9	1	-	--	--	21	2nd TBSHL
1927–28	21	6	14	1	-	56	97	13	3rd MTBSHL
1928–29	18	12	6	1	-	--	--	25	2nd MTBSHL, Allan Cup champion
1929–30	22	16	6	0	-	--	--	25	1st TBSHL, Allan Cup runner-up
1930–31	22	11	9	2	-	--	--	21.5	2nd TBSHL
1931–32	17	11	5	1	-	--	--	23	1st TBSHL
1932–33	20	9	9	2	-	--	--	28	2nd TBSHL
1933–34	14	7	4	3	-	41	34	17	2nd TBSHL
1934–35	21	11	9	1	-	--	--	23	2nd TBSHL, Allan Cup runner-up
1935–36	8	7	1	0	-	54	7	14	Silver Medal, 1936 Olympics
1936–37	Statistics Not Available from IAHL season								
1937–38	26	10	14	2	-	85	103	22	3rd IAHL
1938–39	23	14	6	3	-	--	--	31	1st TBSHL, Allan Cup champion
1939–40	23	13	8	2	-	--	--	28	1st TBSHL
1940–41	Statistics Not Available								
1941–42	17	14	3	0	-	101	51	28	1st TBSHL, Allan Cup runner-up
1942–43	8	4	4	0	-	45	41	8	1st PASHL
1943–44	Folded due to WW2								
1944–45	Folded due to WW2								
1945–46	8	4	4	0	-	45	44	8	1st TBSHL
1946–47	12	9	2	1	-	--	--	19	1st IAHL
1947–48	9	6	3	0	-	51	45	12	1st TBSHL
1948–49 to 1950–51	No Regular Season								
1951–52	16	4	12	0	-	64	107	8	2nd TBSHL
1952–53	22	5	17	0	-	61	149	8	3rd TBSHL
1953–54	30	10	20	0	-	--	--	20	3rd TBSHL
1954–55	45	14	30	1	-	--	--	29	3rd TBSHL
1955–56	8	4	3	1	-	37	34	9	1st TBSHL
1956–57	3	0	3	0	-	--	--	0	2nd TBSHL
1957–58	3	0	3	0	-	--	--	0	2nd TBSHL
1958–59 to 1959–60	No Regular Season								
1960–61	10	6	4	0	-	45	29	12	1st TBSHL
1961–62	10	7	3	0	-	--	--	14	1st TBSHL
1962–63	15	4	7	4	-	60	67	12	2nd TBSHL
1963–64	22	12	7	3	-	80	74	27	1st TBSHL
1964–65	24	11	9	4	-	90	91	26	2nd TBSHL
1965–66	18	3	14	1	-	65	107	10.5	4th TBSHL
1966–67	12	3	6	3	-	57	67	9	2nd TBSHL
1967–68	14	10	4	0	-	84	53	20	1st TBSHL
1968–69	13	11	2	0	-	85	39	22	1st TBSHL
1969–70	12	2	10	0	-	54	84	4	2nd TBSHL

== See also ==
- Canada men's national ice hockey team
- Ice hockey at the 1936 Winter Olympics

Preceded by Winnipeg Hockey Club	Canada men's Olympic ice hockey team 1936	Succeeded by Ottawa RCAF Flyers
