= Bill Brydge =

Canadian ice hockey player

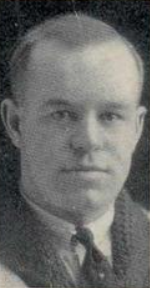
- Brydge c. 1920s
- Born: October 23, 1898 Renfrew, Ontario, Canada
- Died: November 2, 1949 (aged 51)
- Height: 5 ft 9 in (175 cm)
- Weight: 195 lb (88 kg; 13 st 13 lb)
- Position: Defence
- Shot: Right
- Played for: Toronto Maple Leafs; Detroit Cougars; New York Americans
- Playing career: 1926–1936

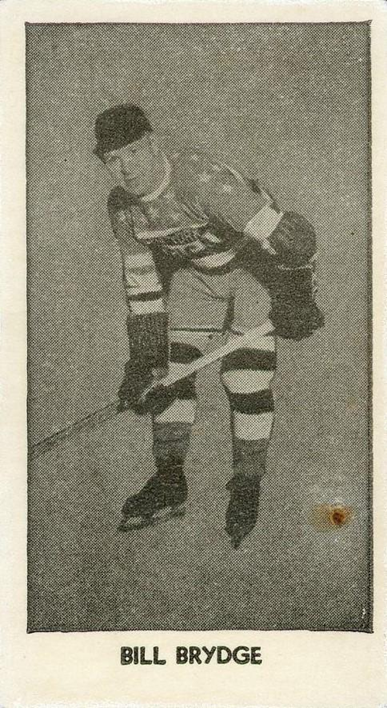
1933-34 card of Brydge for New York Americans

William Henry Beatty Brydge (October 23, 1898 – November 2, 1949) was a Canadian professional ice hockey defenceman who played 368 games in the National Hockey League between 1926 and 1936 for the Toronto Maple Leafs, Detroit Cougars and the New York Americans. He also played 53 games over two seasons in the minor Canadian Professional Hockey League. He was born in Renfrew, Ontario.

== Career statistics ==
=== Regular season and playoffs ===
| | | | Regular season | | | | | Playoffs |
| Season | Team | League | GP | G | A | Pts | PIM | GP | G | A | Pts | PIM |
|---|---|---|---|---|---|---|---|---|---|---|---|---|
| 1921–22 | Iroquois Falls Flyers | NOHA | — | — | — | — | — | 4 | 4 | 2 | 6 | 12 |
| 1922–23 | Iroquois Falls Papermakers | NOHA | — | — | — | — | — | — | — | — | — | — |
| 1923–24 | Port Arthur Bearcats | MHL | 16 | 2 | 5 | 7 | 8 | 2 | 0 | 0 | 0 | 2 |
| 1924–25 | Port Arthur Bearcats | MHL | 20 | 13 | 4 | 17 | 9 | 10 | 7 | 1 | 8 | 20 |
| 1925–26 | Port Arthur Bearcats | MHL | 20 | 9 | 3 | 12 | 18 | 3 | 2 | 0 | 2 | 8 |
| 1925–26 | Port Arthur Ports | Al-Cup | — | — | — | — | — | 6 | 1 | 1 | 2 | 16 |
| 1926–27 | Toronto St. Pats/Maple Leafs | NHL | 41 | 6 | 3 | 9 | 76 | — | — | — | — | — |
| 1927–28 | Detroit Olympics | Can-Pro | 41 | 5 | 4 | 9 | 91 | 2 | 0 | 0 | 0 | 8 |
| 1928–29 | Detroit Cougars | NHL | 31 | 2 | 2 | 4 | 59 | 2 | 0 | 0 | 0 | 4 |
| 1928–29 | Detroit Olympics | Can-Pro | 12 | 6 | 0 | 6 | 24 | — | — | — | — | — |
| 1929–30 | New York Americans | NHL | 41 | 2 | 6 | 8 | 64 | — | — | — | — | — |
| 1930–31 | New York Americans | NHL | 43 | 2 | 5 | 7 | 70 | — | — | — | — | — |
| 1931–32 | New York Americans | NHL | 48 | 2 | 8 | 10 | 77 | — | — | — | — | — |
| 1932–33 | New York Americans | NHL | 48 | 4 | 15 | 19 | 60 | — | — | — | — | — |
| 1933–34 | New York Americans | NHL | 48 | 6 | 7 | 13 | 44 | — | — | — | — | — |
| 1934–35 | New York Americans | NHL | 47 | 2 | 6 | 8 | 29 | — | — | — | — | — |
| 1935–36 | New York Americans | NHL | 21 | 0 | 0 | 0 | 27 | — | — | — | — | — |
| NHL totals | | | 368 | 26 | 52 | 78 | 506 | 2 | 0 | 0 | 0 | 4 |
