= Edward Whalen =

Edward Whalen may refer to:

- Ed Whalen (broadcaster) (1927–2001), Canadian broadcaster and journalist
- Ed Whalen (ice hockey) (fl. 1910s), ice hockey player

== See also ==
- Edward Whelan (disambiguation)
