= Bill Thomson (ice hockey) =

- Born: March 23, 1914 Troon, Scotland, United Kingdom
- Died: August 6, 1993 (aged 79)
- Height: 5 ft 9 in (175 cm)
- Weight: 162 lb (73 kg; 11 st 8 lb)
- Position: Right wing
- Shot: Right
- Played for: Detroit Red Wings
- Playing career: 1931–1949
Medal record
Men's Ice hockey
Representing Canada
Silver medal – second place	1936 Garmisch-Partenkirchen	Team

William Ferguson Thomson (March 23, 1914 – August 6, 1993) was a Scottish-born Canadian ice hockey player. He played nine games in the National Hockey League with the Detroit Red Wings during the 1938–39 and 1943–44 seasons. The rest of his career, which lasted from 1931 to 1947, was spent in various minor leagues. Internationally Thomson played for Canada at the 1936 Winter Olympics, winning the silver medal.

== Early life ==
Thomson was born in Troon, Scotland, United Kingdom, and grew up in Port Arthur, Ontario. He played in Port Arthur for several years before turning professional in 1937.

== Career ==
Thomson played nine games professionally in the National Hockey League for the Detroit Red Wings. Thomson played with the Port Arthur Bearcats who won the 1935 Allan Cup as senior champions in Canada, and served as the Canadian national team at the 1936 Winter Olympics. Thomson scored seven goals in eight games to help win the silver medal. In 1987, he was inducted into the Northwestern Ontario Sports Hall of Fame as a member of that Olympic team.

== Career statistics ==
=== Regular season and playoffs ===
			Regular season					Playoffs
Season	Team	League	GP	G	A	Pts	PIM	GP	G	A	Pts	PIM
1930–31	Kenora Thistles	WDJHL	12	7	8	15	2	3	0	0	0	0
1931–32	Port Arthur Ports	TBSHL	17	4	7	11	6	2	1	0	1	0
1932–33	Port Arthur Ports	TBSHL	19	7	3	10	4	5	1	0	1	6
1933–34	Port Arthur Ports	TBSHL	13	8	4	12	20	4	1	0	1	0
1934–35	Port Arthur Ports	TBSHL	14	5	2	7	8	4	2	1	3	0
1934–35	Port Arthur Bearcats	Al-Cup	—	—	—	—	—	7	7	1	8	0
1935–36	Port Arthur Ports	TBSHL	8	7	0	7	2	5	0	1	1	4
1936–37	Port Arthur Bearcats	TBSHL	31	34	15	49	31	3	2	0	2	2
1937–38	Syracuse Stars	IAHL	47	7	9	16	17	8	0	0	0	0
1938–39	Detroit Red Wings	NHL	4	0	0	0	0	—	—	—	—	—
1938–39	Pittsburgh Hornets	IAHL	38	8	14	22	10	—	—	—	—	—
1938–39	Syracuse Stars	IAHL	14	1	3	4	2	—	—	—	—	—
1939–40	Indianapolis Capitals	IAHL	38	10	26	36	12	5	0	4	4	2
1939–40	Syracuse Stars	IAHL	2	0	0	0	0	—	—	—	—	—
1940–41	Indianapolis Capitals	AHL	44	5	15	20	23	—	—	—	—	—
1940–41	Pittsburgh Hornets	AHL	1	0	0	0	0	—	—	—	—	—
1941–42	Omaha Knights	AHA	50	26	27	53	11	8	6	7	13	0
1942–43	Indianapolis Capitals	AHL	55	23	22	45	4	7	4	2	6	10
1943–44	Detroit Red Wings	NHL	5	2	2	4	0	2	0	0	0	0
1943–44	Indianapolis Capitals	AHL	45	20	38	58	6	5	2	4	6	0
1944–45	Indianapolis Capitals	AHL	32	9	19	28	17	5	1	3	4	0
1945–46	St. Louis Flyers	AHL	23	2	10	12	0	—	—	—	—	—
1945–46	Hershey Bears	AHL	28	5	13	18	6	3	0	3	3	2
1946–47	Hershey Bears	AHL	13	2	5	7	0	—	—	—	—	—
1946–47	Minneapolis Millers	USHL	26	8	13	21	12	3	0	1	1	0
1947–48	Tulsa Oilers	USHL	56	10	24	34	0	1	1	0	1	0
1948–49	Dallas Texans	USHL	11	4	3	7	0	—	—	—	—	—
1948–49	Seattle Ironmen	PCHL	9	0	7	7	0	—	—	—	—	—
IAHL/AHL totals			380	92	174	266	97	33	7	16	23	14
NHL totals			9	2	2	4	0	2	0	0	0	0

=== International ===
Year	Team	Event	GP	G	A	Pts	PIM
1936	Canada	OLY	8	7	0	7	2
Senior totals			8	7	0	7	2

== See also ==
- List of National Hockey League players from the United Kingdom
