= Raymond Milton =

Canadian ice hockey player

- Born: August 27, 1912 Stouffville, Ontario, Canada
- Died: September 17, 2003 (aged 91)
- Position: Defence
- Played for: Port Arthur Bearcats
- National team: Canada
Medal record
Men's Ice hockey
Silver medal – second place	1936 Garmisch-Partenkirchen	Team competition

Raymond Bernard Milton (August 27, 1912 Stouffville, Ontario – September 17, 2003) was a Canadian ice hockey player who competed in the 1936 Winter Olympics.

Milton was a member of the 1936 Port Arthur Bearcats, which won the silver medal for Canada in ice hockey at the 1936 Winter Olympics. At the end of the 1935-36 season, he left the Bearcats and joined the Lake Shore Blue Devils in Kirkland Lake. In 1987 he was inducted into the Northwestern Ontario Sports Hall of Fame as a member of that Olympic team.
