= Maxwell Deacon =

Canadian ice hockey player

- Born: March 22, 1910 Port Arthur, Ontario, Canada
- Died: April 29, 1970 (aged 60)
- Position: Right Wing
- Shoots: Right
- Played for: Port Arthur Bearcats (1936)
- National team: Canada
Medal record
Men's Ice hockey
| Silver medal – second place | 1936 Garmisch-Partenkirchen | Team competition |

Maxwell Arnold Deacon (March 22, 1910 – April 29, 1970) was a Canadian ice hockey player who competed in the 1936 Winter Olympics. Deacon was a member of the 1936 Port Arthur Bearcats, which won the silver medal as the Canadian national team in ice hockey at the 1936 Winter Olympics. In 1987 he was inducted into the Northwestern Ontario Sports Hall of Fame as a member of that Olympic team.
