= Fred Kearney =

Canadian ice hockey player

- Born: May 19, 1897 Pembroke, Ontario, Canada
- Died: November 6, 1998 (aged 101)
- Height: 5 ft 8 in (173 cm)
- Weight: 170 lb (77 kg; 12 st 2 lb)
- Position: goaltender
- Played for: St. Louis Flyers; Fort William Forts; Fort William Hockey Club; Fort William Thundering Herd
- Playing career: 1917–1935

Fred Kearney (May 19, 1897 – November 6, 1998) was a Canadian ice hockey player.

Born in Pembroke, Ontario, on May 19, 1897, Kearney moved to Fort William in 1909. He began playing amateur hockey in Fort William amateur ranks beginning in 1913. Kearney was a member of the Lakehead Intermediate Hockey Team which won the 1924 Thunder Bay Intermediate League. The team then played for the Scotland Woollen Mills trophy.

In 1927 Kearney played goal the Fort William senior hockey team winning the Western Canadian Senior Hockey Championships. The team then faced the Toronto Grads in the Allan Cup finals in Vancouver. Fort William's "Thundering Herd were part of the most memorable finals in the history of the competition." The team lost to Toronto 2–1 in overtime; Kearney apparently displayed "incredible" skill during the game.

From 1929 to 1931, Kearney played professional hockey for the St. Louis Flyers of the American Hockey Association. Making stops his teammates and opponents referred to as "impossible", more than once he had streaks of three shut-outs. He established a record of 103 stops in two games.

Kearney rejoined the Fort William Senior Hockey Team as goalie following a mandatory three-year waiting period. The team won the Thunder Bay District League Championships in 1934, and the Western Canada Senior Championship.

Kearney was inducted into the Northwestern Ontario Sports Hall of Fame on September 26, 1998.
