= Danny Cox (ice hockey) =

Canadian ice hockey player

- Born: October 12, 1903; Little Current, Ontario, Canada
- Died: August 8, 1982 (aged 78)
- Height: 5 ft 10 in (178 cm)
- Weight: 174 lb (79 kg; 12 st 6 lb)
- Position: Left wing
- Shot: Left
- Played for: Toronto St. Patricks; Toronto Maple Leafs; Ottawa Senators; Detroit Falcons; New York Rangers
- Playing career: 1926–1941

Daniel Smith "Silent Danny" Cox (October 12, 1903 — August 8, 1982) was a Canadian professional ice hockey left winger who played 321 games in the National Hockey League between 1926 and 1934. He was born in Little Current, Ontario.

== Career ==
Cox played for the Toronto St. Patricks, Toronto Maple Leafs, Ottawa Senators, Detroit Falcons, and New York Rangers. He spent the last several years of his playing career in the minor leagues, including serving as a player-coach in the Pacific Coast Hockey League, retiring in 1941.

== Career statistics ==
=== Regular season and playoffs ===
			Regular season					Playoffs
Season	Team	League	GP	G	A	Pts	PIM	GP	G	A	Pts	PIM
1922–23	Port Arthur Ports	TBSHL	16	23	3	26	7	2	0	1	1	0
1923–24	Port Arthur Ports	TBSHL	16	12	9	21	3	2	0	0	0	0
1924–25	Port Arthur Ports	TBSHL	20	12	4	16	7	10	8	3	11	0
1925–26	Port Arthur Ports	TBSHL	20	5	3	8	6	3	1	0	1	0
1925–26	Port Arthur Ports	Al-Cup	—	—	—	—	—	6	1	0	1	8
1926–27	Toronto St. Pats/Maple Leafs	NHL	14	0	1	1	4	—	—	—	—	—
1926–27	Hamilton Tigers	Can-Pro	19	7	2	9	6	2	1	1	2	0
1927–28	Toronto Maple Leafs	NHL	41	9	6	15	27	—	—	—	—	—
1928–29	Toronto Maple Leafs	NHL	42	12	7	19	14	4	0	1	1	4
1929–30	Toronto Maple Leafs	NHL	18	1	4	5	18	—	—	—	—	—
1929–30	Ottawa Senators	NHL	24	3	2	5	20	2	0	0	0	0
1930–31	Ottawa Senators	NHL	44	9	12	21	12	—	—	—	—	—
1931–32	Detroit Falcons	NHL	47	4	6	10	23	2	0	0	0	2
1932–33	Ottawa Senators	NHL	47	4	7	11	8	—	—	—	—	—
1933–34	Ottawa Senators	NHL	29	0	4	4	0	—	—	—	—	—
1933–34	New York Rangers	NHL	13	5	0	5	2	2	0	0	0	0
1934–35	Minneapolis Millers	CHL	48	21	24	45	8	5	0	1	1	4
1934–35	Quebec Castors	Can-Am	—	—	—	—	—	3	0	0	0	0
1935–36	Philadelphia Ramblers	Can-Am	48	24	23	47	36	4	1	1	2	0
1936–37	Philadelphia Ramblers	IAHL	46	12	15	27	18	6	0	1	1	14
1937–38	Seattle Seahawks	PCHL	38	7	7	14	6	4	0	0	0	4
1938–39	Seattle Seahawks	PCHL	39	11	13	24	18	7	3	1	4	9
1939–40	Wichita Skyhawks	AHA	31	10	19	29	4	—	—	—	—	—
1940–41	Seattle Olympics	PCHL	—	—	—	—	—	—	—	—	—	—
NHL totals			319	47	49	96	128	10	0	1	1	6
