= Norm Larson =

Canadian ice hockey player

- Born: October 13, 1920 Moose Jaw, Saskatchewan, Canada
- Died: December 22, 2001 (aged 81)
- Height: 6 ft 0 in (183 cm)
- Weight: 174 lb (79 kg; 12 st 6 lb)
- Position: Right Wing
- Shot: Right
- Played for: New York Rangers; Brooklyn Americans; New York Americans
- Playing career: 1940–1953

Norman Lyle Larson (October 13, 1920 — December 22, 2001) was a Canadian ice hockey right winger. He played 89 games in the National Hockey League between 1940 and 1947 for the New York Americans, Brooklyn Americans, and New York Rangers. The rest of his career, which lasted from 1940 to 1953, was spent in various minor leagues. He was born in Moose Jaw, Saskatchewan.

== Career statistics ==
=== Regular season and playoffs ===
			Regular season					Playoffs
Season	Team	League	GP	G	A	Pts	PIM	GP	G	A	Pts	PIM
1937–38	Moose Jaw Canucks	S-SJHL	8	16	4	20	4	7	11	5	16	5
1938–39	Moose Jaw Millers	S-SSHL	24	16	6	22	2	10	8	2	10	2
1939–40	Moose Jaw Millers	S-SSHL	26	23	9	32	4	8	10	2	12	4
1939–40	Moose Jaw Millers	Al-Cup	—	—	—	—	—	3	1	0	1	0
1940–41	New York Americans	NHL	48	9	9	18	6	—	—	—	—	—
1941–42	Brooklyn Americans	NHL	40	16	9	25	6	—	—	—	—	—
1941–42	Springfield Indians	AHL	5	3	3	6	0	4	1	2	3	0
1942–43	Port Arthur Shipbuilders	TBSHL	8	5	10	15	6	3	1	2	3	2
1942–43	Lakehead Army	TBDHL	1	2	3	5	0	—	—	—	—	—
1942–43	Port Arthur Shipbuilders	Al-Cup	—	—	—	—	—	13	16	11	27	9
1942–43	Port Arthur Bearcats	Al-Cup	—	—	—	—	—	8	6	8	14	13
1943–44	Port Arthur Shipbuilders	TBSHL	6	20	3	23	0	—	—	—	—	—
1944–45	Quebec Aces	QSHL	14	18	17	35	2	5	7	3	10	0
1944–45	Quebec Aces	Al-Cup	—	—	—	—	—	3	3	2	5	0
1945–46	New Haven Ramblers	AHL	40	19	26	45	18	—	—	—	—	—
1945–46	Hershey Bears	AHL	24	17	27	44	2	3	2	0	2	0
1946–47	New York Rangers	NHL	1	0	0	0	0	—	—	—	—	—
1946–47	New Haven Ramblers	AHL	11	1	5	6	0	—	—	—	—	—
1947–48	Hershey Bears	AHL	19	4	1	5	0	—	—	—	—	—
1948–49	Hershey Bears	AHL	55	13	24	37	13	8	0	2	2	0
1949–50	Hershey Bears	AHL	68	20	35	55	8	—	—	—	—	—
1950–51	Calgary Stampeders	WCMHL	47	28	35	63	20	8	1	3	4	2
1951–52	Calgary Stampeders	PCHL	65	30	25	55	18	—	—	—	—	—
1952–53	Calgary Stampeders	WHL	1	0	0	0	0	—	—	—	—	—
1952–53	Kamloops Elks	OSHL	45	26	21	47	22	12	4	8	12	0
1953–54	Kimberley Dynamiters	WIHL	39	23	29	52	12	9	1	4	5	8
1953–54	Kimberley Dynamiters	Al-Cup	—	—	—	—	—	5	1	0	1	4
1954–55	Kimberley Dynamiters	WIHL	26	10	16	26	17	8	2	3	5	2
1955–56	Kimberley Dynamiters	WIHL	43	35	37	72	6	5	1	1	2	2
AHL totals			222	77	121	198	41	15	3	4	7	0
NHL totals			89	25	18	43	12	—	—	—	—	—
