= Bud Jarvis =

Canadian ice hockey player

- Born: December 7, 1907; Fort William, Ontario, Canada
- Died: May 7, 1983 (aged 75)
- Height: 5 ft 6 in (168 cm)
- Weight: 165 lb (75 kg; 11 st 11 lb)
- Position: Left wing
- Shot: Left
- Played for: NHL; Pittsburgh Pirates; Philadelphia Quakers; Toronto Maple Leafs; AHL; Hershey Bears; Providence Reds; Syracuse Stars; IHL; Buffalo Bisons; CAHL; Springfield Indians
- Playing career: 1929–1944

James Alexander "Jim, Bud" Jarvis (December 7, 1907 – May 7, 1983) was a Canadian professional ice hockey left winger who played three seasons in the National Hockey League for the Pittsburgh Pirates, Philadelphia Quakers and Toronto Maple Leafs between 1929 and 1937. The rest of his career, which lasted from 1929 to 1944, was spent in various minor leagues. He was born in Fort William, Ontario.

== Career statistics ==
=== Regular season and playoffs ===
			Regular season					Playoffs
Season	Team	League	GP	G	A	Pts	PIM	GP	G	A	Pts	PIM
1927–28	Port Arthur Ports	TBSHL	20	13	7	20	14	—	—	—	—	—
1928–29	Port Arthur Ports	TBSHL	17	13	5	18	10	2	1	1	2	0
1928–29	Port Arthur Ports	Al-Cup	—	—	—	—	—	7	4	4	8	6
1929–30	Pittsburgh Pirates	NHL	44	11	8	19	32	—	—	—	—	—
1930–31	Philadelphia Quakers	NHL	44	5	7	12	30	—	—	—	—	—
1931–32	Springfield Indians	Can-Am	39	4	5	9	24	—	—	—	—	—
1932–33	Buffalo Bisons	IHL	37	11	6	17	14	6	0	3	3	0
1933–34	Buffalo Bisons	IHL	44	12	3	15	25	6	0	3	3	2
1934–35	Buffalo Bisons	IHL	44	8	11	19	16	—	—	—	—	—
1935–36	Buffalo Bisons	IHL	48	13	9	22	20	5	0	1	1	0
1936–37	Buffalo Bisons	IAHL	10	3	0	3	6	—	—	—	—	—
1936–37	Toronto Maple Leafs	NHL	24	1	0	1	0	—	—	—	—	—
1936–37	Syracuse Stars	IAHL	12	1	1	2	24	7	0	0	0	7
1937–38	Providence Reds	IAHL	47	6	6	12	4	7	1	1	2	0
1938–39	Providence Reds	IAHL	51	2	16	18	14	5	0	0	0	0
1939–40	Providence Reds	IAHL	27	9	15	24	6	—	—	—	—	—
1939–40	Hershey Bears	IAHL	23	9	12	21	4	6	1	0	1	2
1940–41	Geraldton Gold Miners	GBHL	19	4	4	8	4	4	1	0	1	0
1943–44	Hershey Bears	AHL	31	8	14	22	2	7	1	1	2	0
NHL totals			112	17	15	32	62	—	—	—	—	—
