= Fred Page =

Canadian ice hockey administrator and referee

- Born: September 29, 1915; Port Arthur, Ontario, Canada
- Died: December 23, 1997 (aged 82); North Vancouver, British Columbia, Canada
- Occupations: Ice hockey administrator, ice hockey referee, and businessman
- Known for: TBAHA president CAHA president IIHF vice-president PCJHL & BCJHL executive CJAHL chairman
- Awards: Canadian Centennial Medal, 1967; Northwestern Ontario Sports Hall of Fame, 1986; Hockey Hall of Fame, 1993; BC Hockey Hall of Fame, 1995; BC Sports Hall of Fame, 2001
- Honours: Fred Page Cup

Frederick Page (September 29, 1915 – December 23, 1997) was a Canadian ice hockey administrator and ice hockey referee. He originated from Port Arthur, Ontario, where he played junior ice hockey, refereed locally and later at the Memorial Cup and Allan Cup competitions. He was a league executive in Fort William, then served as president of the Thunder Bay Amateur Hockey Association from 1958 to 1962. He was elected second vice president of the Canadian Amateur Hockey Association (CAHA) in 1962, and rose up the ranks to be its president from 1966 to 1968. Page wanted the CAHA to gain more control over its affairs, and become less dependent on the National Hockey League (NHL). Under his leadership, the NHL ended direct sponsorship of junior hockey teams. He was instrumental in negotiating the revised agreement for the NHL Amateur Draft in 1967, and later served as co-chairman of the resulting joint player development committee.

Page served as vice-president of the International Ice Hockey Federation from 1966 to 1972, where he helped organize the Ice Hockey World Championships, and served as a director of ice hockey at the Olympic Games. He assisted in negotiating international hockey participation on behalf of Canada, and was one of the four signatories of the agreement to play the 1972 Summit Series between the Canadian and the Soviet Union national teams. He later became a founding member of the Pacific Coast Junior Hockey League and the Canadian Junior A Hockey League, and presided over the British Columbia Junior Hockey League. He was inducted into the Northwestern Ontario Sports Hall of Fame, the Hockey Hall of Fame, the BC Hockey Hall of Fame, and the BC Sports Hall of Fame. He received the Canadian Centennial Medal, and was made the namesake of the Fred Page Cup.

== Early life and Thunder Bay hockey ==
Page was born on September 29, 1915, in Port Arthur, Ontario. He grew up playing minor ice hockey in Port Arthur, then played junior ice hockey for the 1934–35 season. He won the Thunder Bay Amateur Hockey Association (TBAHA) championship with the Port Arthur Juniors that season. His finished his playing career in the 1938–39 season with the Nipigon Intermediates.

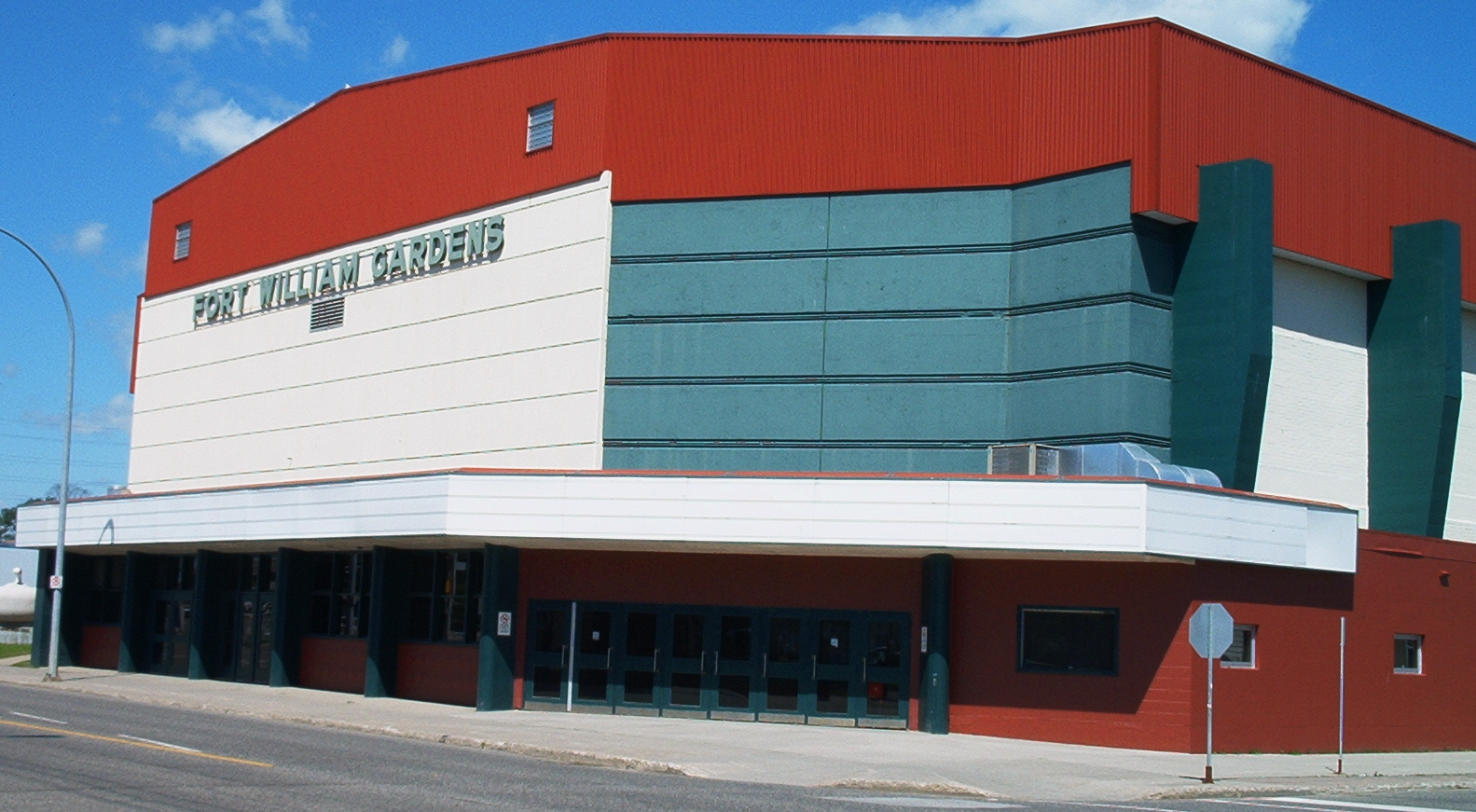
Page refereed the first game played at the Fort William Gardens (pictured) when it opened on March 6, 1951.

From 1940 to 1948, Page was an ice hockey referee and a coach in Fort William minor hockey. He was promoted to officiating for the TBAHA from 1948 to 1954. He refereed the first game played at the Fort William Gardens when it opened on March 6, 1951. He was recognized for his refereeing abilities, and was selected to officiate in playoffs for the Memorial Cup and the Allan Cup. During game three of the 1953 Memorial Cup Western Canada final, Leo Konyk scored an overtime game-winning goal for the St. Boniface Canadiens, then grabbed Page who was refereeing, and began dancing with him at center ice. After the incident, Page implied that he did not like dancing. He later officiated in the 1958 Memorial Cup playoffs, and at 1958 Allan Cup tournament.

Page became involved as an executive with the Fort William Minor Hockey Association in 1948, and was elected to be the organization's president in 1951. He later served on the TBAHA executive committee starting in 1954, and was its president from 1959 to 1964. He arranged to have exhibition games at the Fort William Gardens with teams from the Soviet Union and Japan during the 1959–60 season. He also urged for residents in Port Arthur to push for a replacement to the lost Port Arthur Arena. During Fort William's general meeting in 1960, he announced the hosting duties for the 1961 Canadian Amateur Hockey Association (CAHA) general meeting.

Page also participated on the CAHA committee in his role as the TBAHA president. He was the CAHA executive who oversaw the Western half of the 1960 Memorial Cup playoffs. He ordered the final match of a series to be stopped due to on-ice violence, and awarded the series to the Brandon Wheat Kings. At the 1961 general meeting of the CAHA, Page made a motion to provide greater compensation for the visiting team in senior ice hockey playoffs to cover travel expenses. At the same meeting, he opposed a motion which gave the CAHA president or his representative the power to choose either the two-referee-system without linesmen, or the one-referee-two-linesmen system for CAHA playoffs. Page preferred having one referee and two linesmen. In the winter of 1961–62, he co-chaired the Port Arthur Bearcats European exhibition game tour and travelled with the team. The Bearcats visited Czechoslovakia, East Germany and Sweden, and won the 1962 Ahearne Cup.

== CAHA vice-president ==
Page was elected the second vice-president of the CAHA on May 25, 1962, and served in the role under president Art Potter until 1964. Page chaired the Western Canada junior hockey committee that examined the reduced calibre of play in the Memorial Cup, brought on by rapid expansion which included 17 new teams in the British Columbia Amateur Hockey Association (BCAHA) within two years. In December 1962, he negotiated a new draft agreement with the National Hockey League (NHL) to allow the drafting of four 17-year-olds, with a payment of $2,000 to the junior club. He also acted as a chaperone for the Soviet Union national ice hockey team on tour in Canada in December 1962. From 1963 to 1964, he was the chairman of a CAHA committee to establish a leadership program and clinics for coaches.

Canadian international play...

"We used to go to Europe, get drunk for five days, and still beat everybody. That all ended in the 1960s."

— Fred Page, 1990

Page was elected the first vice-president of the CAHA on May 23, 1964, and served in the role under president Lionel Fleury until 1966. Page served on the CAHA committee to oversee the Canada men's national junior ice hockey team, and the committee to examine the existing professional amateur draft agreement, and the financial reliance of the CAHA on the NHL. He was also placed in charge of the Lacombe Rockets tour of Switzerland, Czechoslovakia and Sweden, during December 1964.

His role as vice-president was occupied by the arbitration committee to resolve disagreements between the provinces and the respective junior leagues. The Manitoba Amateur Hockey Association (MAHA) and the Saskatchewan Amateur Hockey Association (SAHA) were at odds, due to the Flin Flon Bombers and the Brandon Wheat Kings playing in the Saskatchewan Junior Hockey League (SJHL) instead of in the Manitoba Junior Hockey League (MJHL). Page and the committee reached a resolution by profit sharing the ticket sales between the leagues and teams. He also admitted a mistake in the Western junior playoffs structure, and agreed to revisit the issue as proposed by Jimmy Dunn and the MJHL.

Page was in charge of the Western junior playoffs for the 1964 Memorial Cup, and stated it was too late to change the playoffs when the SAHA did not meet its deadline to determine a league winner to face the BCAHA champion. He decided that the SJHL should give financial compensation to the BCAHA team, as per the CAHA regulations. He was later in charge of the contentious 1965 Memorial Cup, which included many penalties between the Edmonton Oil Kings and the Niagara Falls Flyers.

Page was re-elected as first vice-president on May 28, 1965. He announced that the CAHA would choose the site of the 1966 Memorial Cup based on recommendations from the Ontario Hockey Association (OHA) champion, despite the desire of the OHA to host games in Maple Leaf Gardens for the biggest profit, and that no set rule was in place for determining the location of the games. The games were ultimately played in the Gardens, since the OHA championship was won by the nearby Oshawa Generals.

Page also attended exploratory meetings in May 1966, between the CAHA and potential team owners in Western Canada. Discussions included concerns about financial burdens on owners, junior age limits, and a draft proposal with the NHL to end direct team sponsorship. He chaired the CAHA general meeting while Fleury was absent due to a heart condition. Page said that he expected to enter talks with the NHL regarding a new professional-amateur pact being proposed by the CAHA, and that the old agreement would end in June 1967. At the same meeting, the CAHA accepted the Canadian Interuniversity Athletic Union as an associate member.

== CAHA president ==
=== First year ===
Page was elected president of the CAHA on May 28, 1966, and served in the role for two years until 1968. While president, he was chairman of the Canadian national team committee, and chairman of the CAHA rules committee. He wanted the CAHA to gain more control over its affairs, become more independent from the NHL, a move away from junior-aged players being bound by contracts to professional teams. He set about to replace the existing system of NHL clubs directly sponsoring junior teams with a universal draft instead. He recognized that a new system might cost more money to operate, but give the CAHA more control over its junior players in the future. He entered into negotiations for a new player development agreement between the CAHA, the NHL, and the Amateur Hockey Association of the United States (AHAUS).

Page refereed in the Memorial Cup competition (trophy pictured) in 1958, and as CAHA president suspended the Canadian Major Junior Hockey League from competing for the trophy.

Page and NHL president Clarence Campbell announced a new tentative five-year agreement on August 19, 1966, with several proposed changes to the existing system, effective July 1, 1967. The direct sponsorship of junior teams by the NHL was to be phased out in the upcoming year, and no new sponsored players could be registered or be required to sign a contract restricting movement between teams. The agreement eliminated the A, B and C forms, which had angered the parents of amateur players and were the source of legal action threats when the professional team refused to release a player. Page succeeded in getting junior-aged players to be eligible for the NHL Amateur Draft once they graduate from junior hockey, or to be signed as a free agent in the year the player reaches his 20th birthday. The NHL agreed to pay development fees to the CAHA for the drafted players, and it allowed the CAHA to distribute the fees. The new agreement came at a time that also leveled the playing field for new NHL clubs in the 1967 NHL expansion.

Despite the new agreement, Page faced challenges from teams in Western Canada which wanted the age limit to be 21, and allow the movement of players to team in other provinces. The dissenting teams dropped out of the SJHL, and formed the independent Canadian Major Junior Hockey League (CMJHL) which was not sanctioned by the CAHA. Page suspended those persons involved with the CMJHL, and the CAHA amended its internal rules to revoke the suspensions if the players or the league returned to CAHA jurisdiction. He instructed the Alberta Amateur Hockey Association (AAHA) and SAHA branches to inform of the suspensions from the CAHA, and was forced to call an emergency meeting of the CAHA, when the Quebec Amateur Hockey Association (QAHA) joined the AAHA, and the SAHA in opposition to the suspensions. The meeting resulted in the suspension of CMJHL commissioner Frank Boucher and the teams' governors, in addition to the players. The CAHA invited teams and players to rejoin the SJHL or the Alberta Junior Hockey League to be eligible to compete for the Memorial Cup. The CMJHL proceeded with legal action against Page and the CAHA, with the aim to have the suspension lifted and be eligible for the Memorial Cup.

On the international side of the game, the new agreement that Page negotiated with the NHL included provisions for players to be reinstated as amateurs after two years of not playing professional, or by a review board for a quicker decision. Despite those provisions, Page said that the CAHA recognized suspensions handed out by the NHL, and would not permit Carl Brewer to play as an amateur with the Canada men's national ice hockey team unless the reason for the suspension was resolved with the Toronto Maple Leafs.

In 1966, Avery Brundage of the International Olympic Committee (IOC) threatened to drop hockey from the Winter Olympic Games due to the increasing professional and commercial nature of the sport. Page did not take the threat seriously, since he believed that profits from hockey actually kept the Olympics going. Page confirmed that the CAHA considered withdrawing from the International Ice Hockey Federation (IIHF) in March 1967, if Canada was not given hosting duties for either the 1969 or 1970 World Ice Hockey Championships. Canada had never hosted the event, and proposed co-hosting with AHAUS at Colorado Springs, Colorado.

=== Second year ===
The 1967 CAHA general meeting saw Page re-elected as president, and ratification of the new 5-year professional-amateur agreement. NHL teams agreed to pay $3,000 for each of the first 72 players, and $2,000 per any player drafted thereafter or signed as a free agent. Page and the CAHA would then oversee the distribution of draft fees to teams which developed the player. The agreement also set up a joint player development committee to grow the talent pool and skill level, and Page served as its co-chairman. The CAHA constitution was amended at the general meeting to give absolute powers to the executive when needed, which aimed to prevent further court cases. The executive committee also decided on applications by senior teams to play in the Ahearne Cup and the Spengler Cup, and began the process of starting a second Canadian national team based in Ottawa, in addition to the Winnipeg-based national team. Page and the CAHA were also faced with Quebec sovereignty movement sentiments in the QAHA, where some leagues broke away from the English-dominated CAHA. Page and the QAHA intended to use the opportunity to play on the second Canadian national team as a drawing card to stay within the CAHA.

Page refereed in the Allan Cup (trophy pictured) competition in 1958, and as CAHA president in 1968, arranged for the first games in the United States.

Later in 1967, the IIHF awarded Canada hosting duties for the 1970 World Ice Hockey Championships A pool, and gave permission to use minor league professionals and reinstated amateurs at event. Page replied to the Russian protests of professionals by saying that "it was decided upon by a majority vote, and there was little that the Russians could do to change it". Page felt that the Canadian national team was typically restricted by the exclusion of professionals at the Olympics. He felt that professional contracts were more lucrative to Canada's best younger players than the $2,500 scholarship which the CAHA offered to cover tuition and living expenses.

The CAHA invited all cities in Canada with arenas of 10,000 seats or more to bid for hosting games in the 1970 World Ice Hockey Championships. Applications were received from Montreal, Toronto, Winnipeg, and Vancouver. The Winnipeg Free Press speculated that Vancouver and the Pacific Coliseum had a good chance of hosting, due to Page residing in the area. He later announced that the first 15 games of the championships were to be played at the Montreal Forum, with the final 15 games at the Winnipeg Arena.

The CAHA later approved a proposal for a transatlantic hockey league, including the national teams from Canada, Soviet Union, Czechoslovakia, Sweden, and the United States. The proposal was to be submitted at the upcoming IIHF meeting. Page felt that the success of the proposal depended on Soviet participation. He later stated that suggestions by IIHF president Bunny Ahearne to include the top senior club teams from each country, would not be as appealing to Canadian spectators as opposed to national teams. The league never came to be as Sweden and Czechoslovakia expressed concerns about travel time since players worked other jobs, and no commitment was made by the Soviets.

In other CAHA business, Page announced that the Spokane Jets would host the 1968 Allan Cup quarterfinals, which marked the first time that Allan Cup games were played outside of Canada. The CAHA changed a rule to allow games in Spokane, and had the Jets reached the finals, they would have hosted.

== Post-CAHA presidency ==
Page became the past president of the CAHA in May 1968, and was succeeded by Lloyd Pollock as president. As past president, Page remained on the joint CAHA-NHL player development committee. The NHL supported the committee and refused to do business with the Canadian Hockey Association (CHA) or its affiliated Western Canada Hockey League (WCHL) led by Ron Butlin. The WCHL had switched allegiance from the CAHA to the CHA in June 1968, in a dispute over the age limits from the new NHL draft agreement Page had negotiated. Page later assisted in negotiations to unify amateur hockey in Quebec. He said that changes would be made to the QAHA constitution to "give a greater voice and representation to all categories", and thereby appease the breakaway Quebec Amateur Hockey Federation. He also approved of the Japan Ice Hockey Federation sponsoring Hiroshi Hori, to play as an imported junior for the Winnipeg Monarchs in the 1968–69 season of the MJHL.

On October 22, 1968, Page confirmed he received the resignation of Pollock as president of the CAHA with "deep regret", and that no changes in positions would be made until the executive meeting in January. Page was later put in charge of the western 1969 Allan Cup playoffs, and acted as co-chairman of the 1969 CAHA general meeting at the Palliser Hotel in Calgary, along with Joe Kryczka the AAHA president. Page also served as chairman of the CAHA junior hockey committee which upheld the NHL's junior age limit of 20, but also agreed to ask the NHL for age 21. His term as past president expired on May 29, 1971, when Earl Dawson assumed the role. The CAHA then passed a by-law to give life membership to all past presidents. Page continued to attend CAHA meetings as a life member, and was appointed a director-at-large of the CAHA in September 1971.

== International hockey ==
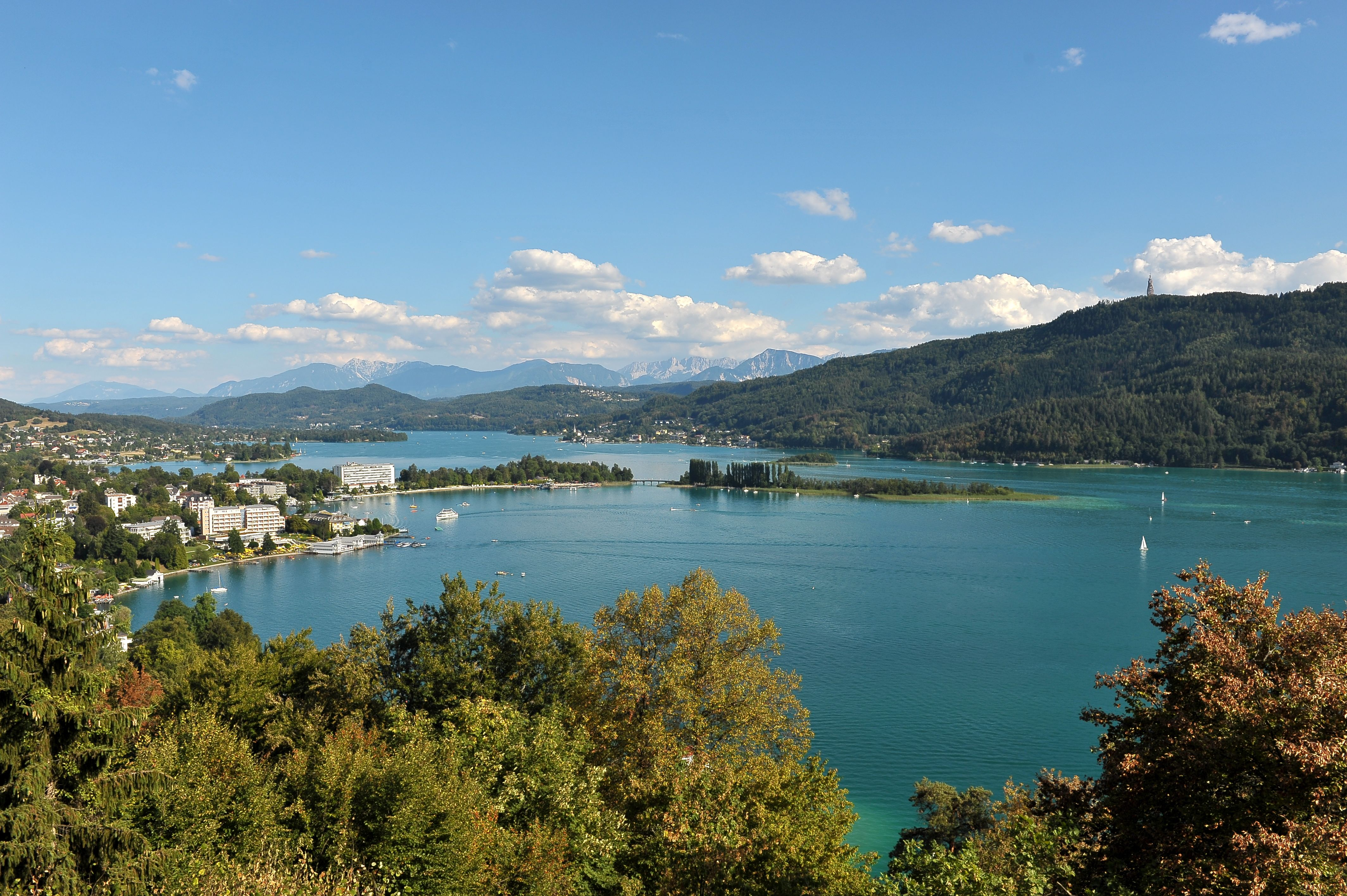
Page was elected to his first of two terms as IIHF vice-president, while attending the IIHF congress at Pörtschach am Wörthersee (pictured) in Austria.

Page attended the 1966 summer congress of the IIHF in Pörtschach am Wörthersee, Austria, and was elected second vice-president of the IIHF for a three-year term. He was later elected for a three-year term first-vice president of the IIHF, at the 1969 summer congress in Crans-Montana, Switzerland. As the IIHF vice-president, he oversaw its North American membership. During this time he helped set up leadership clinics, and was also a director-at-large for the CAHA to keep them informed of international matters. He continued to assist facilitating teams who wished to travel between North America and Europe, helped organize the Ice Hockey World Championships, and served as a director at the 1968 Winter Olympics in Grenoble, and the 1972 Winter Olympics in Sapporo.

For the planned 1970 World Ice Hockey Championships in Canada, Page stated that the deadline to enter was extended by a week, to allow the Soviets to decide whether they will attend due to disagreements on the proposed schedule. He confirmed that if the Soviets did not play, the United States would take their place in Pool A. He also said that Sweden was protesting since Canada withdrew from the annual Ahearne Cup hosted in Sweden, when Canada received poor press coverage in Sweden.

In December 1969, Brundage declared that any country playing against professionals from Canada would be ineligible for the 1972 Winter Olympics. Page didn't understand the fuss caused by Brundage's statement, and further stated that Canada had played exhibition games using professionals against other countries without any opposition raised by Brundage. Page attempted to work out a compromise by suggesting that Canada host an exhibition tournament instead of an official World Championship, and attended an emergency meeting of the IIHF to discuss the Olympic eligibility concerns along with Gordon Juckes and Dawson from the CAHA. The IIHF ultimately decided against allowing professionals at the 1970 World Ice Hockey Championships, with Ahearne casting a tie-breaking vote against it. On January 20, 1970, Canada withdrew from international play and resigned hosting duties of the 1970 World Ice Hockey Championships. Page requested a special meeting with the IIHF in February to discuss the issue, attended by Harold Wright of the Canadian Olympic Association, but the meeting did not result in any progress on the matter.

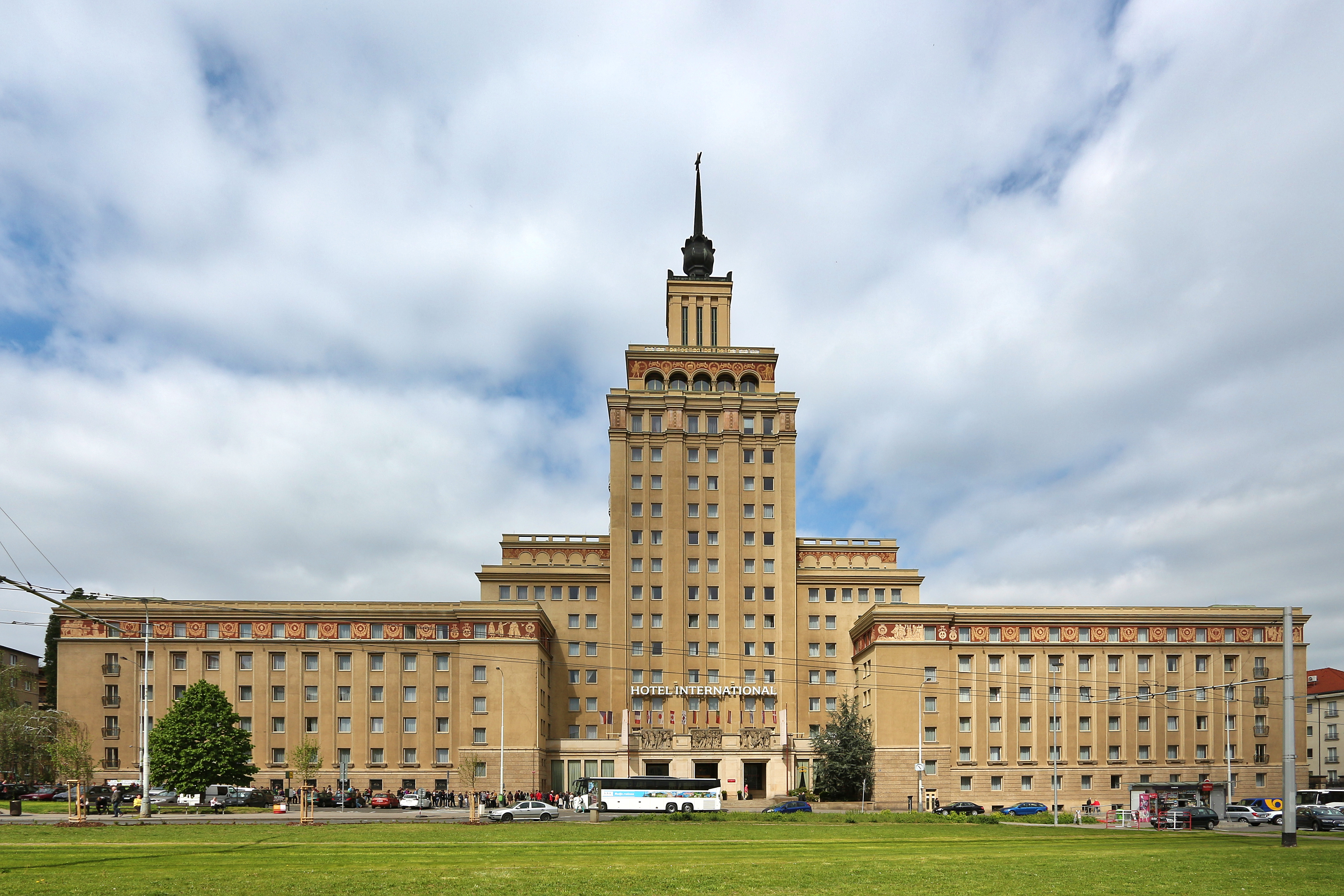
The Hotel International Prague (pictured) was the site of the 1972 Summit Series negotiations, signed by Page which returned Canada to international ice hockey competition.

In May 1971, Canada began to renegotiate a return to international hockey tournaments. Page said that Europeans had suggested a Christmas tournament with the senior ice hockey champions from Canada and the United States, playing against the Ahearne Cup champions. In February 1972, he stated the possibility of Canada and the Soviet Union playing each other using professionals by May 1972, but admitted there were difficulties in negotiation. He expected talks to continue during the 1972 Winter Olympics in Sapporo. He had begun negotiating with Anatoly Tarasov in 1971, but both sides played the waiting game for a year. Page stated that negotiating hockey agreements in Canada was increasingly difficult, due to the complexity of the CAHA, Hockey Canada, and the NHL.

Canada and the Soviet Union agreed to play eight games against each other using their best players available including professionals, which later became known as the 1972 Summit Series. Page was one of the four signatories who approved the agreement on April 18, 1972, at the Hotel International Prague, giving his approval as vice-president of the IIHF. It was also signed by Joe Kryczka as president of the CAHA, Andrey Starovoytov as the general secretary of the Soviet Union Ice Hockey Federation, and Ahearne as the president of the IIHF. Alan Eagleson was the first Canadian to phone the press and take credit for the event, but Page said that Eagleson was never invited to the Canada-Soviet series negotiations.

Page attended the 1972 IIHF summer congress was held in Mamaia, Romania. He was nominated to replace Ahearne as president, and was expected by the CAHA to be acclaimed since the president's position had alternated every three years between Europe and North America. Instead of Page being acclaimed, Ahearne declared a vote must take place, and the Europeans disapproved of the nomination. Ahearne was later re-elected in lieu of an acceptable North American candidate.

== British Columbia hockey ==
Page assisted in the formation of the Pacific Junior A Hockey League (PCJHL) in 1971, and became its executive director. He then and then served as its president from 1975 to 1979. The league operated in competition with the British Columbia Junior Hockey League (BCJHL). In 1976, Page announced that the Chilliwack Bruins were transferring from the rival BCJHL to the PCJHL.

The two leagues agreed to a merger in 1979, under the BCJHL name. Page served as the executive director of the BCJHL from 1979 to 1982, as its president from 1982 to 1983, and as its chairman of the board from 1980 until 1996. He spoke out against the Western Hockey League when its teams began drafting players below age 15, with the rationale that it was necessary to compete with the NHL, which was signing younger players. He also fought for BCJHL teams who had players drafted by NHL teams, but were did not receive compensation payments. Page was in favour of mandatory neck protection at the junior level, in response to a player's death by a skate blade slash in the neck in 1985.

Page was one of the BCJHL delegates with attended the founding meeting of the Canadian Junior A Hockey League in November 1993, and was nominated as that league's inaugural chairman of the board. Page retired from his various positions in 1996, after serving 23 years as a hockey executive in British Columbia.

== Professional life ==
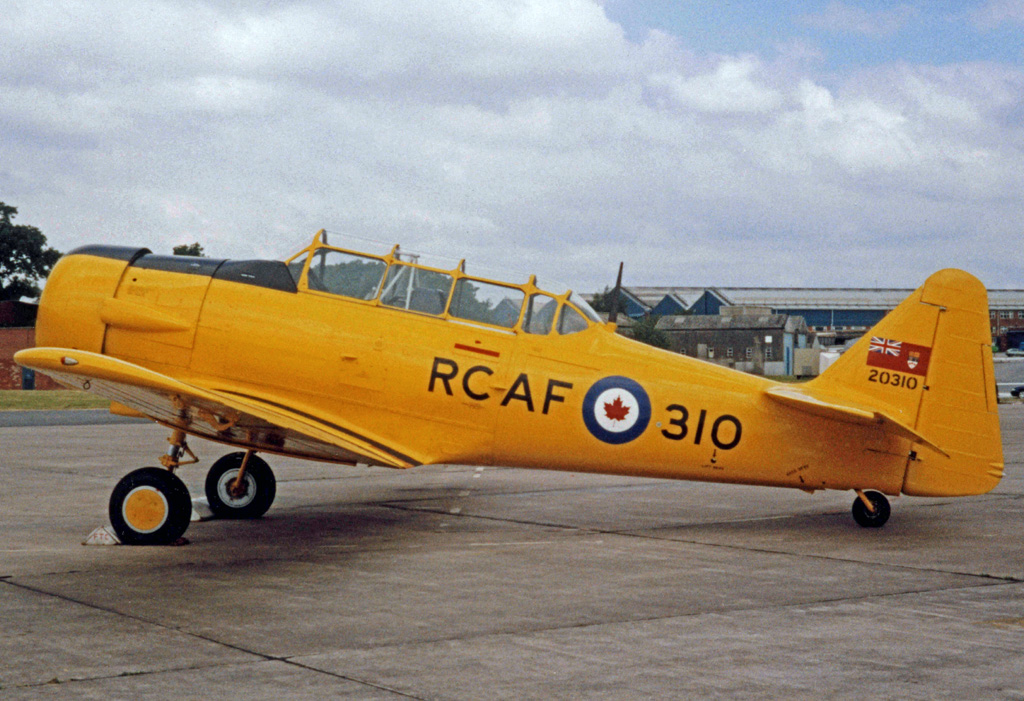
Page oversaw manufacturing of components at the Port Arthur Shipbuilding Company for building the Harvard (pictured).

Page worked as a land surveyor for the Ontario Department of Highways from 1935 to 1939. He then worked for the Canadian Car and Foundry (Can Car) in Fort William from 1940 to 1947. He began in Can Car's planning department, and was later promoted to the manager of its subcontracts. He oversaw the acquiring of parts to construct Hawker Hurricanes for the Royal Canadian Air Force (RCAF), and Curtiss SB2C Helldivers for the Royal Navy. From 1945 to 1947, he oversaw acquiring of materials for bus manufacturing at the foundry. In 1945, he started his own business to supply flooring materials for transportation vehicles constructed at Can Car.

In 1951, he joined the Port Arthur Shipbuilding Company (PASC) on a part-time basis to set up its aircraft division, and supply parts under subcontract to Can Car. He was later promoted to full-time supervisor of the aircraft division at PASC, working there until 1965. He oversaw manufacturing of components for the Harvard as an RCAF trainer aircraft, the Grumman S-2 Tracker for the Royal Canadian Navy, and components for the Avro Canada CF-105 Arrow. He later supervised the design and manufacturing of glass-reinforced plastic used in pulp and paper mills in Northern Ontario.

Page moved westward in 1966, and began working for Industrial Coatings Limited in Richmond, British Columbia, as a sales manager and assistant plant manager. The company was later renamed to ICL Engineering. Page was elected to its board of directors in 1969, where he continued in the same role until his retirement.

== Personal life ==
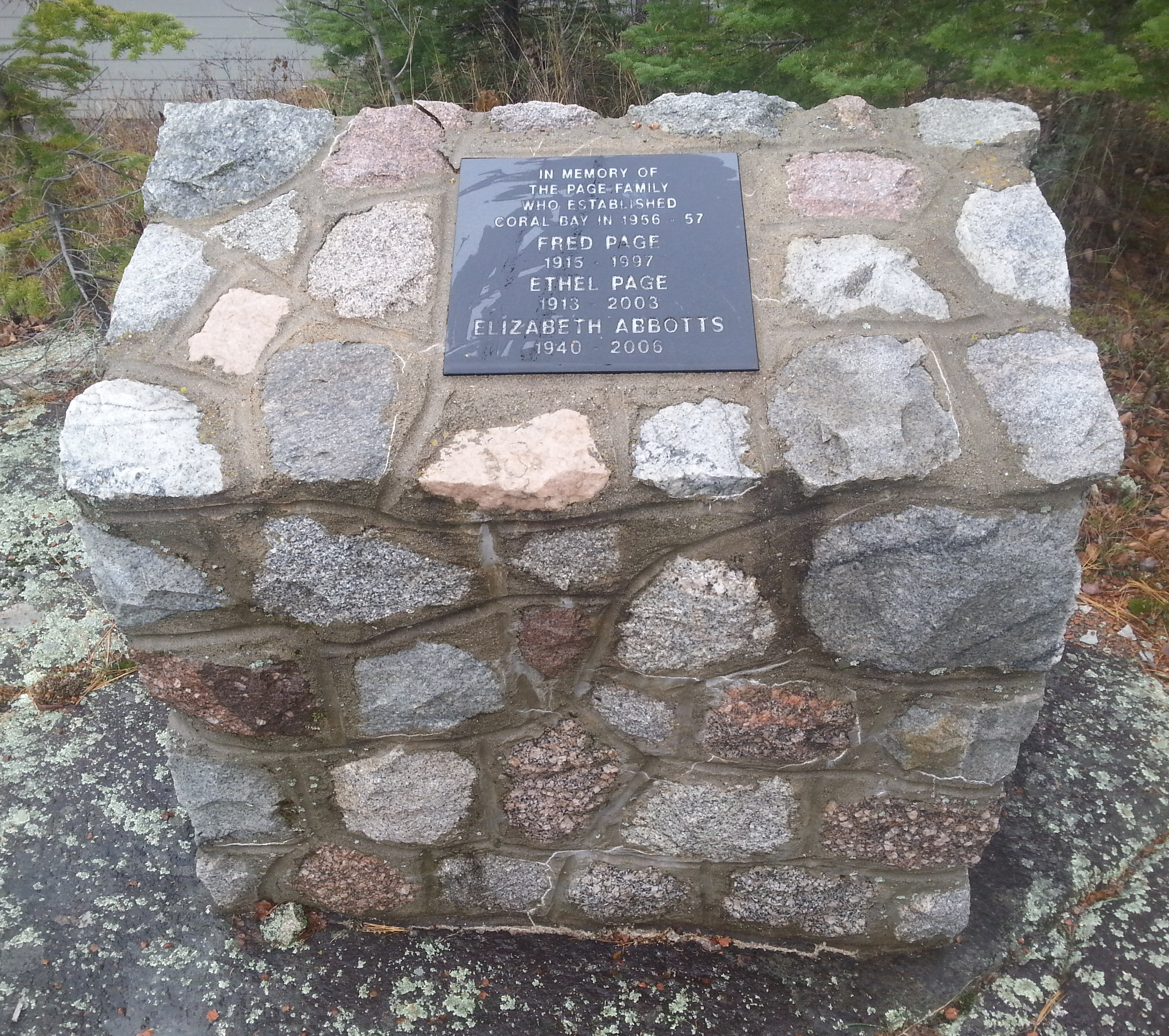
Page's memorial cairn (pictured) near the family's cottage

Page and his brother were raised by their single father William Page, who was a custodian at the Port Arthur Court House. Page attended Hillcrest High School in Port Arthur, then began a working career without attending postsecondary school.

Page married Ethel Hylda Willianen on October 6, 1937, at the Finnish Lutheran Church in Port Arthur. The couple honeymooned in Chicago and Detroit, then resided in Fort William, Ontario. His wife Ethel soon began a career as a hairdresser. Page was a member of the local Masons Lodge. He established the Coral Bay cottages from 1956 to 1957, near the mouth of the MacKenzie River on Thunder Bay, in Shuniah Township. By 1960, the couple had two daughters and had moved to Port Arthur.

Page moved to North Vancouver, British Columbia, in 1965. He soon became involved with the North Shore Winter Club, and coached a Pee-Wee aged hockey team with the club. He and Ethel frequently travelled together to international hockey events, and returned regularly to Thunder Bay, Ontario, supporting the local Hall of Fame induction dinners.

Page died on December 23, 1997, at the Lions Gate Hospital in North Vancouver. He had been married to Ethel for 60 years. He was cremated and his ashes were scattered near his family cottage.

== Honours and awards ==
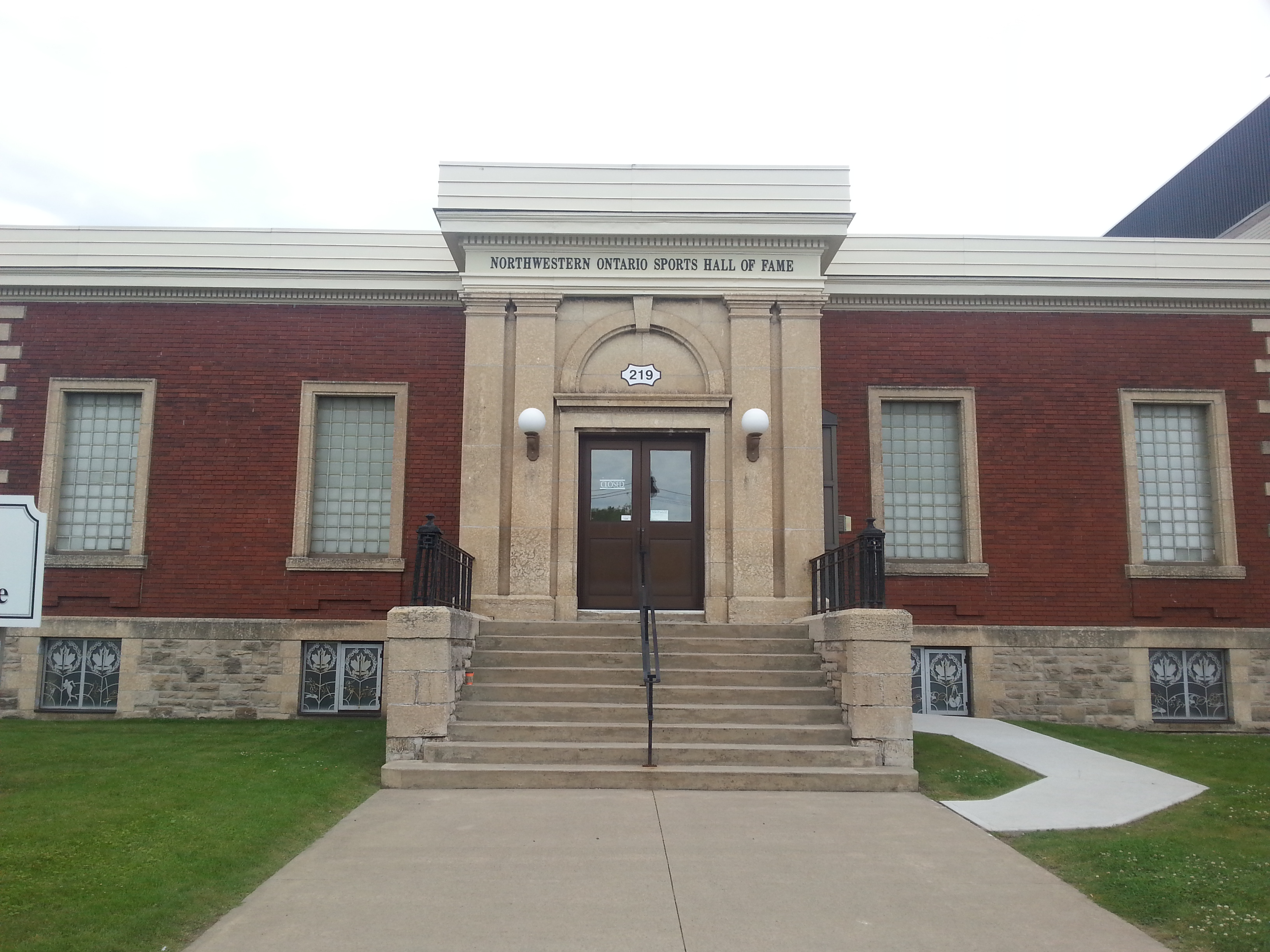
The Northwestern Ontario Sports Hall of Fame (pictured) inducted Page in 1986.

Page was made a life member of the Fort William Minor Hockey Association in 1954, after his term as president expired. He received several citations for service including; the Fort William Minor Hockey Association for ten years of service in 1962, the IIHF in 1967, the Canadian Centennial Medal in 1967, and both the CAHA and AHAUS in 1971. The Japanese Olympic Committee gave him a citation in 1972, for assistance in organizing ice hockey at the 1972 Winter Olympics. He was made a life member of the CAHA on May 25, 1973. He was inducted into the Northwestern Ontario Sports Hall of Fame in 1986.

Page was honoured for a lifetime of dedication to hockey with induction into the Hockey Hall of Fame in 1993, in the builder category. In British Columbia he was inducted as a builder into two halls of fame, first the BC Hockey Hall of Fame in 1995, and then posthumously into the BC Sports Hall of Fame in 2001.

He is the namesake of two different Fred Page Cups, one in British Columbia, the other in Eastern Canada. The British Columbia Hockey League awards a Fred Page Cup for its annual playoffs championship. The Canadian Junior Hockey League awards a different Fred Page Cup which began in 1995, to the Eastern Canada Junior A champion, who then moves onto the national RBC Cup competition. He has also been the namesake of the North Shore Winter Club's Midget AAA hockey tournament since 1984, and was named by BC Hockey Now as chairman of its all-century team in 1999.

== Bibliography ==
- Lapp, Richard M.; Macaulay, Alec (1997). The Memorial Cup: Canada's National Junior Hockey Championship. Madeira Park, British Columbia: Harbour Publishing. ISBN 1-55017-170-4.
- Houston, William; Shoalts, David (1993). Eagleson: The Fall of a Hockey Czar. Whitby, Ontario: McGraw-Hill Ryerson. ISBN 0-07-551706-X.
- McKinley, Michael (2014). It's Our Game: Celebrating 100 Years Of Hockey Canada. Toronto, Ontario: Viking Press. ISBN 978-0-670-06817-3.
