= Thunder Bay Twins =

- City: Thunder Bay, Ontario
- League: USHL 1970-1975; OHA Sr. A 1975-1979; Manitoba Sr. A 1979-1986; OHA Sr. A 1986-1987; Manitoba Sr. A 1987-1991
- Operated: 1970-1991
- Home arena: Fort William Gardens
- Colours: Green, Yellow, and White
- Head coach: Joe Wirkkunen, Lee Fogolin Sr., Dave Siciliano, Bill McDonald

Previous franchise history
- 19xx-1970: Fort William Beavers
- 1915-1970: Port Arthur Bearcats

The Thunder Bay Twins were an Amateur Senior and Professional ice hockey team from Thunder Bay, Ontario, Canada. The Twins won five Allan Cups as National Senior Champions from 1970 until 1991.

== Origin ==
On 1 January 1970, the City of Thunder Bay was formed through the merger of the neighbouring cities of Fort William and Port Arthur, along with portions of smaller townships.

Fort William and Port Arthur had a long history of teams competing in Senior "A" hockey, dating back to at least the Port Arthur Bearcats's loss in a 1911 challenge for the Stanley Cup. In 1916 a team from Fort William was the first area team to challenge for the Allan Cup, emblematic of the amateur senior hockey championship. Teams from the two cities played for the Allan Cup 13 times from 1916 through 1955, winning 4 Allan Cup championships – all by the Bearcats – in 1925, 1926, 1929 and 1939. The Fort William Beavers would be the last area team, pre-merger, to be a finalist for the Allan Cup when they were the runner-up in 1955.

When the city of Thunder Bay was formed, the Port Arthur Bearcats and the Fort William Beavers, longtime teams playing in the Thunder Bay Senior A Hockey League (TBSHL), merged to form the Thunder Bay Twins for the 1970–71 season.

== USHL and the OHA ==
The newly created Thunder Bay Twins started in the American United States Hockey League (USHL) in 1970, when the USHL was operating as a semi-professional senior ice hockey league. Port Arthur native Joe Wirkkunen became the first head coach of the Twins, after previously coaching the Finland men's national ice hockey team.

In the 1974–75 season, Dave Siciliano served as a player-coach for the Twins. He led the team to 36 wins in 48 games, and a second-place finish in the Northern Division. The Twins defeated the first-place Green Bay Bobcats two games to none in a best-of-three series in the first round of the playoffs. The Twins won the final round of the playoffs with three consecutive wins versus Waterloo Black Hawks in a best-of-five series for the USHL championship.

The Allan Cup

The Twins had chosen not to participate in the 1975 Allan Cup playoffs for the Canadian senior hockey championship due to scheduling conflicts with the USHL playoffs. After the St. Boniface Mohawks appealed for reconsideration, the Twins entered the Allan Cup playoffs upon the conclusion of the USHL playoffs, then won the series versus the Mohawks. In the Western Canada finals, the Twins won the best-of-five series with three consecutive victories versus the Spokane Flyers. The Twins scored five goals in the last 25 minutes of the decisive third game, including the winning goal scored with six seconds remaining. In a best-of-seven series for the national championship, Siciliano and the Twins won the Allan Cup by defeating the defending champion Barrie Flyers four games to two. The Twins then withdrew from the USHL due to travel costs and schedule commitments to represent Canada on a European tour in the 1975–76 season.

The Thunder Bay Twins moved to the OHASr for the 1975–76 season, bringing the Allan Cup to the league it had just defeated to win the cup. The Twins played in the OHASr through the 1978–79 season. In those four seasons, the Twins won two regular season championships and one league playoff title.

== Thunder Bay Hockey League ==
From at least 1980 until 1982, the Twins competed in the Thunder Bay Hockey League. This all-city super-league consisted of four teams. With the Twins were the Tier II Junior "A" Thunder Bay Kings, the Intermediate A Thunder Bay Blazers and the CIAU Lakehead Nor'Westers. The Twins were easily the top team in the 1980–81 season and swept the playoffs. The 1981–82 season had the other three teams give the Twins more trouble. The Twins were upset by the Nor'Westers in the semi-final, and the league was won by the Jr. A Kings.

== Central Sr. A ==
From 1982 until 1986, the Twins played in the Manitoba's Central Senior A Hockey League. In 1981, the Twins hosted a round robin tournament to determine an Allan Cup champion. The Twins started off the tournament against the Petrolia Squires, defeating them 8–3. In game two, they faced the Grand Falls Cataracts and defeated them 9–4. In the third and final game of the round robin, the Twins met the St. Boniface Mohawks and beat them 5–4 in overtime to clinch first place in the round robin. In the tournament semi-final, something went wrong for the twins. In their second straight game against the Mohawks, the Twins were shocked 4-3 and eliminated from the tournament despite a 3–1 record. The Petrolia Squires won the 1981 Allan Cup.

In 1984, the Twins were again Manitoba and Western Canadian champions. They played host to the Cambridge Hornets at the Fort Williams Gardens in a best-of-seven series. The Twins opened the series squeezing out a 3–2 victory over the Hornets. Cambridge came back in game two and rocked the Twins 7–3. After this, the Twins battened down the hatches and fought through a pair of tight wins (5–3, 6–5) to clinch the series in game five with a convincing 6–1 win to clinch the team's second Allan Cup.

In 1985, the Twins repeated as Manitoba and Western champions and found themselves in a best-of-seven marathon with the Corner Brook Royals in Corner Brook, Newfoundland. So far from home, the Twins may have accomplished one of the greatest feats in amateur hockey history. The Corner Brook Royals crushed the jet-lagged Twins 9–5 in game one. Game two went a little better for the Twins, as they forced overtime but were overpowered by the Royals 3–2. Game three needed to be won by the Twins, but again they were embarrassed by the Eastern champions 9–5. With their back against the wall down 3-games-to-none, the Twins began their trek back. Game four ended with a 4–2 nail-biter of a win for the Twins. Game five saw the Twins embarrass a seemingly deflated Royals squad 8–3. The Twins took game six 2–0 and then finished the comeback with an unbearably close 5–4 victory. With their third Allan Cup victory, the Twins became the only team in Allan Cup history to come back from a 3–0 deficit to win the Allan Cup. As the tournament is now in a round robin format and a revert to best-of-sevens are very unlikely, the feat may never be repeated. In 1986 they were eliminated 4 game to 1 in the league final by the St. Boniface Mohawks.

== OHA and back to Manitoba ==
In 1986, the Twins moved to the four-team OHA Senior A Hockey League. After one lackluster season for the Twins, the league folded and the Twins returned to the Manitoba Senior A Hockey League.

The 1987–88 season had the Twins win the Manitoba and Western titles and find themselves in the Allan Cup final again. Playing at home in the Gardens, the Twins found themselves against a starkly lesser opponent. The Eastern champions in 1988 were the Charlottetown Islanders. The Twins easily swept the Islanders by scores of 7–4, 10–2, 9–3, and 7-1 respectively to win their fourth ever Allan Cup.

The 1989 Allan Cup brought a significant challenge to the Twins. After losing the league championship to the St. Boniface Mohawks, the Twins hosted the Allan Cup round robin with three other teams. In game one of the round robin, the Twins met their old rival in the St. Boniface Mohawks and lost 5–3. In game two, the Twins met the Montreal Team Chomedey and defeated them 6–3. In the final game of the round robin, the Twins met the Bassano Hawks and defeated soundly 7–1 to clinch second place. Thunder Bay found themselves in a sudden death semi-final against Montreal for the right to play in the final. The Twins beat Chomedey 6–3. The final was set up as a best-of-three games set and was against St. Boniface. The Twins avenged the 1981 Allan Cup semi-final loss to the Mohawks by defeating them 2-0 and then 4–2 to win their fifth Allan Cup championship.

After winning the 1990-91 Manitoba title and the Western Canadian championship, the Twins found themselves yet again in the Allan Cup final. The Eastern champion was the Charlottetown Islanders, a team that the Twins had embarrassed in 1988 in a lopsided four-game-sweep. This time the Islanders came out to return the favour in their own home rink in Charlottetown, Prince Edward Island. The Islanders won four straight games (5–3, 5–2, 5–4, and 5–4 in overtime) to kill the Twins dream of a sixth Allan Cup.

== The end ==
That summer, the Colonial Hockey League announced plans to expand to the city of Thunder Bay. The Twins made way for the semi-Professional Thunder Bay Thunder Hawks who began play in the 1991–92 season. Senior glory would not return to the city of Thunder Bay until the creation of the Thunder Bay Bombers many years later.

The 1974-75 Thunder Bay Twins were inducted into the Northwestern Ontario Sports Hall of Fame in 1987.

== Season-by-Season results ==
Season	GP	W	L	T	OTL	GF	GA	P	Results	Playoffs
1970-71	40	19	20	1	-	222	194	39	2nd USHL	
1971-72	32	15	17	0	-	158	141	30	2nd USHL	
1972-73	45	37	7	1	-	312	131	69	1st USHL	
1973-74	48	35	12	1	-	285	153	71	1st USHL	
1974-75	48	36	10	2	-	315	159	74	2nd USHL	Won Allan Cup
1975-76	24	20	3	1	-	145	60	74	2nd OHA Sr. A	
1976-77	34	23	10	1	-	212	128	47	1st OHA Sr. A	
1977-78	40	20	17	3	-	196	158	43	4th OHA Sr. A	
1978-79	38	27	10	1	-	189	114	55	1st OHA Sr. A	Won League
1979-80	10	9	1	0	-	--	--	18	N/A CASHL	
1980-81	24	21	3	0	-	190	96	42	1st TBHL	Won League
1981-82	23	16	7	0	-	172	114	32	1st TBHL	Lost semi-final
1982-83	32	22	10	0	-	194	134	44	1st CASHL	DNP
1983-84	34	25	8	1	-	226	143	57	1st CASHL	Won League
1984-85	Manitoba Sr. A Statistics Not Available									
1985-86	36	30	5	1	-	257	136	61	1st CASHL	Lost final
1986-87	35	15	19	1	-	145	184	32	3rd OHA Sr. A	
1987-88	36	28	6	2	-	260	130	58	1st CASHL	Won League
1988-89	32	32	0	0	-	166	77	64	1st CASHL	Lost final
1989-90	32	27	4	2	-	216	110	56	1st CASHL	Won League
1990-91	Manitoba Sr. A Statistics Not Available									

== Sources ==
- Allan Cup Archived History
- 1974-75 team remembered by Hockey Thunder Bay
- Official Game Puck -- Team Histories
