= 1988 Allan Cup =

Canadian senior ice hockey championship

The Allan Cup trophy

The 1988 Allan Cup was the Canadian senior ice hockey championship for the 1987–88 senior "AAA" season. The event was hosted by the Thunder Bay Twins in Thunder Bay, Ontario. The 1988 playoff marked the 80th time that the Allan Cup has been awarded.

== Teams ==
- Charlottetown Islanders (Eastern Canadian Champions)
- Thunder Bay Twins (Western Canadian Champions)

== Best-of-Seven Series ==
Thunder Bay Twins 7 - Charlottetown Islanders 4
Thunder Bay Twins 10 - Charlottetown Islanders 2
Thunder Bay Twins 9 - Charlottetown Islanders 3
Thunder Bay Twins 7 - Charlottetown Islanders 1
