= 1991 Allan Cup =

Canadian senior ice hockey championship

The Allan Cup trophy

The 1991 Allan Cup was the Canadian senior ice hockey championship for the 1990–91 senior "AAA" season. The event was hosted by the Thunder Bay Twins in Thunder Bay, Ontario. The 1991 tournament marked the 83rd time that the Allan Cup has been awarded.

== Teams ==
- Charlottetown Islanders (Eastern Canadian Champions)
- Thunder Bay Twins (Western Canadian Champions)

== Best-of-Seven Series ==
Charlottetown Islanders 5 - Thunder Bay Twins 3
Charlottetown Islanders 5 - Thunder Bay Twins 2
Charlottetown Islanders 5 - Thunder Bay Twins 4
Charlottetown Islanders 5 - Thunder Bay Twins 4 (OT)
