= Edward Whelan =

Edward Whelan may refer to:

- Edward Whelan (Canadian politician) (1824–1867), Irish-born Canadian journalist and politician
- Edward Charles Whelan (1919–2007), Canadian farmer and politician
- Edward Whelan (American lawyer) (born 1960), American lawyer and former government official
- Vermin (character), a supervillain appearing in American comic books published by Marvel Comics
- Edward Whelan (fl. mid-19th century), Irish stonemason and co-principal of O'Shea and Whelan

== See also ==
- Ed Whalen (disambiguation)
