= Am Whalen =

Canadian ice hockey player

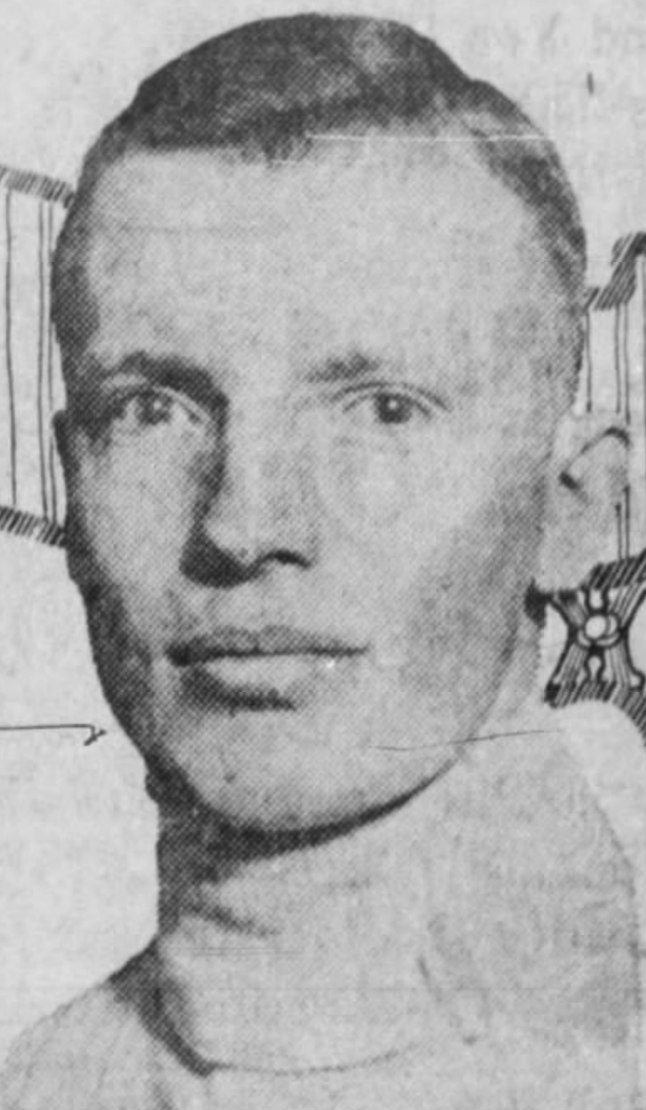
- Born: August 22, 1891 Port Arthur, Ontario, Canada
- Died: February 5, 1948 (aged 56) Vancouver, British Columbia, Canada
- Position: Left Wing
- Shot: Left
- Played for: Vancouver Millionaires
- Playing career: 1911–1918

Ammond "Am" Leslie Angus Whalen (b. August 22, 1891 – d. February 5, 1948) was a Canadian professional ice hockey player from Port Arthur, Ontario. He played for the Vancouver Millionaires of the Pacific Coast Hockey Association during the 1916–17 and 1917–18 seasons.

== Playing in Minnesota ==
The Minneapolis Star Tribune from February 13, 1916, while Whalen was playing hockey in the city, presented him in an article entitled "Canadian Millionaire Plays with Victoria Hockey Team." The article stated that Whalen was a millionaire, and that he controlled a large boat line along with his brother, running between Port Arthur, Fort William, Duluth and Sault Ste. Marie. But as the business did not require the attention of both brothers during the winter, Whalen was free to play hockey instead. The newspaper also claimed that Whalen wanted to play hockey in Minneapolis because the sport was "practically dead" in Canada on account of the war, and also because he wanted to play on the same team as his former teammate Alex "Duke" Wellington.
