= 1984 Allan Cup =

Canadian senior ice hockey championship

The Allan Cup trophy

The 1984 Allan Cup was the Canadian senior ice hockey championship for the 1983–84 senior "A" season. The event was hosted by the Thunder Bay Twins in Thunder Bay, Ontario. The 1984 playoff marked the 76th time that the Allan Cup has been awarded.

== Teams ==
- Cambridge Hornets (Eastern Canadian Champions)
- Thunder Bay Twins (Western Canadian Champions)

== Best-of-Seven Series ==
Thunder Bay Twins 3 - Cambridge Hornets 2
Cambridge Hornets 7 - Thunder Bay Twins 3
Thunder Bay Twins 5 - Cambridge Hornets 3
Thunder Bay Twins 6 - Cambridge Hornets 5
Thunder Bay Twins 6 - Cambridge Hornets 1
