= Steve Wochy =

Canadian ice hockey player (born 1922)

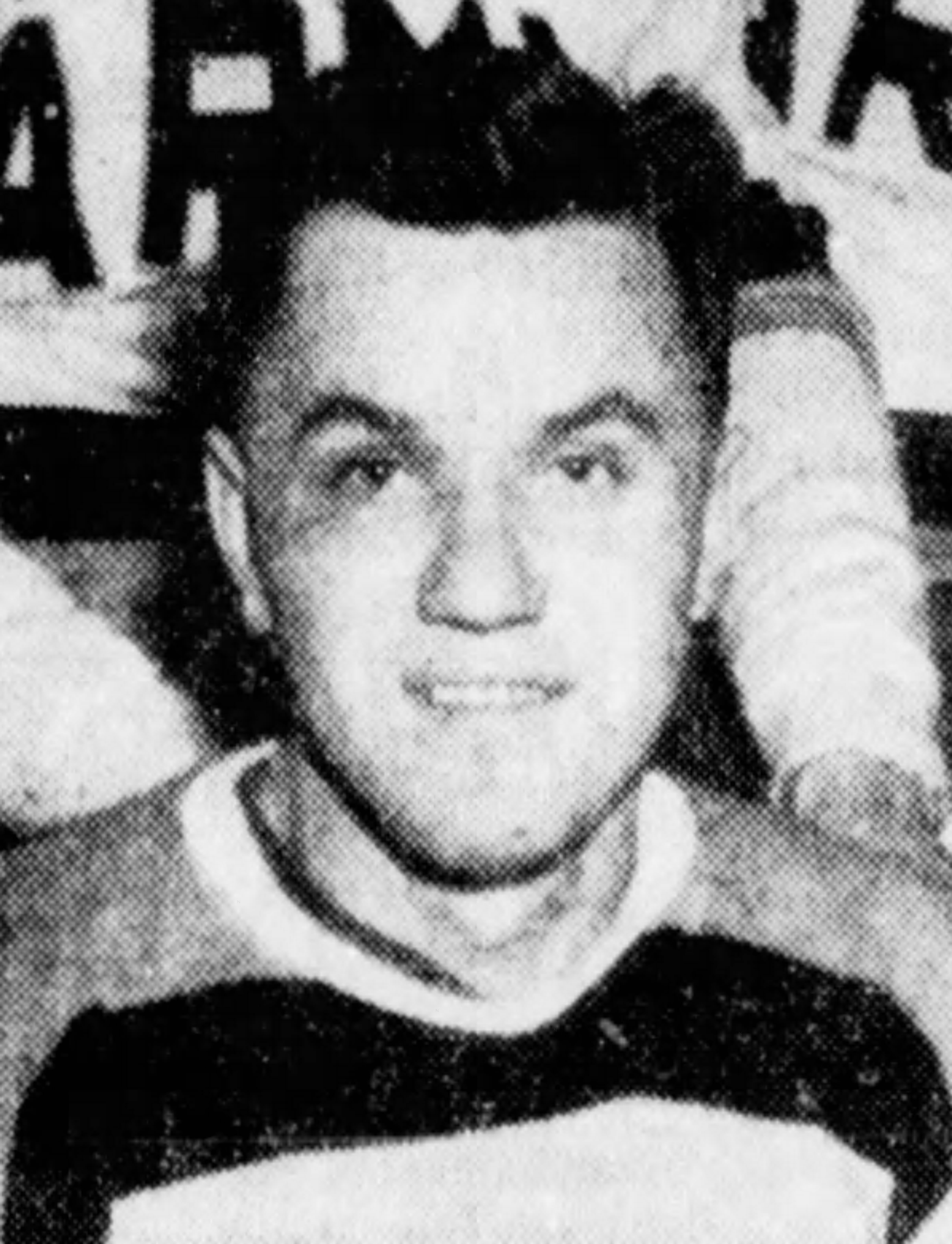
- Wochy, c. 1943
- Born: December 25, 1922 (age 103) Fort William, Ontario, Canada
- Height: 5 ft 8 in (173 cm)
- Weight: 158 lb (72 kg; 11 st 4 lb)
- Position: Right wing
- Shot: Right
- Played for: Detroit Red Wings
- Playing career: 1940–1955

Stephen Wochy (né Wojciechowski; born December 25, 1922) is a Canadian former professional ice hockey player, who played 54 games for the Detroit Red Wings in the National Hockey League between 1944 and 1946. The rest of his career, which lasted from 1940 to 1955, was spent in the minor leagues. He was born in Fort William, Ontario but has called Sault Ste Marie, Ontario his home since 1954. After Jim Conacher's death in April 2020, he became the oldest living former NHL player. He is the second NHL player to become a centenarian, Al Suomi being the first known. He is the last living NHL player who was active in the 1940s.

Before playing in the NHL, Wojciechowski was a member of the Port Arthur Bearcats in 1942 appearing in the 1942 Allan Cup. Wojciechowski played 10 seasons in the American Hockey League after leaving the NHL, with the Indianapolis Capitals, Philadelphia Rockets, Cleveland Barons and Buffalo Bisons. Wojciechowski was named a first-team AHL All-star in 1952.

== Career statistics ==
=== Regular season and playoffs ===
			Regular season					Playoffs
Season	Team	League	GP	G	A	Pts	PIM	GP	G	A	Pts	PIM
1938–39	Fort William Maroons	TBJHL	18	14	11	25	20	5	4	0	4	7
1939–40	Port Arthur Bruins	TBJHL	16	16	9	25	2	—	—	—	—	—
1939–40	Port Arthur Bearcats	TBSHL	1	0	0	0	0	—	—	—	—	—
1940–41	Port Arthur Bruins	TBJHL	16	16	21	37	29	6	8	4	12	4
1941–42	Port Arthur Bruins	TBJHL	18	22	41	63	55	3	4	5	9	13
1941–42	Port Arthur Bearcats	TBSHL	1	1	1	2	0	—	—	—	—	—
1941–42	Port Arthur Bearcats	Al-Cup	—	—	—	—	—	17	10	7	17	17
1942–43	St. Catharines Saints	OHA Sr	17	21	15	36	7	3	1	1	2	0
1943–44	Winnipeg Army	WNDHL	10	8	8	16	2	—	—	—	—	—
1944–45	Detroit Red Wings	NHL	49	19	20	39	17	6	0	1	1	0
1944–45	Indianapolis Capitals	AHL	1	0	0	0	0	—	—	—	—	—
1945–46	Indianapolis Capitals	AHL	30	14	20	34	14	—	—	—	—	—
1945–46	Omaha Knights	USHL	17	4	10	14	4	7	1	2	3	2
1946–47	Detroit Red Wings	NHL	5	0	0	0	0	—	—	—	—	—
1946–47	Indianapolis Capitals	AHL	56	21	24	45	4	—	—	—	—	—
1947–48	Philadelphia Rockets	AHL	68	37	29	66	27	—	—	—	—	—
1948–49	Philadelphia Rockets	AHL	68	29	28	57	37	—	—	—	—	—
1949–50	Cleveland Barons	AHL	47	21	23	44	12	6	3	3	6	4
1950–51	Cleveland Barons	AHL	58	26	30	56	24	—	—	—	—	—
1951–52	Cleveland Barons	AHL	68	37	41	78	42	5	2	0	2	2
1952–53	Cleveland Barons	AHL	64	37	31	68	16	10	1	4	5	2
1953–54	Buffalo Bisons	AHL	70	26	32	58	18	3	0	1	1	2
1954–55	Buffalo Bisons	AHL	17	5	4	9	2	—	—	—	—	—
1954–55	Soo Greyhounds	NOHA	23	10	7	17	13	—	—	—	—	—
AHL totals			547	253	262	515	196	24	6	8	14	10
NHL totals			54	19	20	39	17	6	0	1	1	0
