= Frank Waite =

Canadian ice hockey player

- Born: April 9, 1905; Fort Qu'Appelle, Saskatchewan, Canada
- Died: July 18, 1989 (aged 84)
- Height: 6 ft 0 in (183 cm)
- Weight: 145 lb (66 kg; 10 st 5 lb)
- Position: Centre
- Shot: Left
- Played for: Vancouver Maroons; New York Rangers
- Playing career: 1921–1934

Francis Edward "Deacon" Waite (April 9, 1905 – July 18, 1989) was a Canadian professional ice hockey player who played 17 games in the National Hockey League with the New York Rangers during the 1930–31 season. The rest of his career, which lasted from 1921 to 1934, was spent in various minor leagues.

== Career statistics ==
=== Regular season and playoffs ===
| | | | Regular season | | | | | Playoffs |
| Season | Team | League | GP | G | A | Pts | PIM | GP | G | A | Pts | PIM |
|---|---|---|---|---|---|---|---|---|---|---|---|---|
| 1918–19 | Wolseley Wanderers | SJHL | — | — | — | — | — | 2 | 1 | 0 | 1 | 0 |
| 1919–20 | Wolseley Wanderers | SJHL | — | — | — | — | — | — | — | — | — | — |
| 1920–21 | Wolseley Wanderers | SJHL | — | — | — | — | — | — | — | — | — | — |
| 1921–22 | Indian Head Tigers | SSHL | 5 | 0 | 2 | 2 | 0 | 1 | 0 | 0 | 0 | 0 |
| 1922–23 | Weyburn Wanderers | SSHL | 10 | 5 | 2 | 7 | 9 | 5 | 5 | 1 | 6 | 6 |
| 1923–24 | Brandon Wheat Kings | MHL | 11 | 3 | 2 | 5 | — | 4 | 0 | 1 | 1 | 6 |
| 1924–25 | Trail Smoke Eaters | WKHL | — | — | — | — | — | — | — | — | — | — |
| 1925–26 | Vancouver Maroons | WHL | 28 | 0 | 1 | 1 | 4 | — | — | — | — | — |
| 1926–27 | Springfield Indians | Can-Am | 25 | 7 | 4 | 11 | 24 | 6 | 1 | 1 | 2 | 4 |
| 1927–28 | Springfield Indians | Can-Am | 39 | 7 | 15 | 22 | 36 | 4 | 1 | 1 | 2 | 6 |
| 1928–29 | Boston Tigers | Can-Am | 39 | 12 | 10 | 22 | 42 | 4 | 2 | 0 | 2 | 12 |
| 1929–30 | Boston Tigers | Can-Am | 40 | 23 | 34 | 57 | 57 | 5 | 2 | 3 | 5 | 6 |
| 1930–31 | New York Rangers | NHL | 17 | 1 | 3 | 4 | 4 | — | — | — | — | — |
| 1930–31 | Springfield Indians | Can-Am | 25 | 5 | 25 | 30 | 28 | 6 | 0 | 1 | 1 | 0 |
| 1931–32 | Syracuse Stars | IHL | 43 | 7 | 26 | 33 | 33 | — | — | — | — | — |
| 1932–33 | Cleveland Indians/Detroit Olympics | IHL | 42 | 6 | 12 | 18 | 12 | — | — | — | — | — |
| 1933–34 | London Tecumsehs | IHL | 11 | 1 | 3 | 4 | 6 | — | — | — | — | — |
| 1933–34 | Philadelphia Arrows | Can-Am | 31 | 11 | 19 | 30 | 15 | 2 | 0 | 1 | 1 | 10 |
| Can-Am totals | | | 199 | 65 | 107 | 172 | 202 | 27 | 6 | 7 | 13 | 38 |
| NHL totals | | | 17 | 1 | 3 | 4 | 4 | — | — | — | — | — |
