= Gord Wilson =

Canadian ice hockey player (1932–2023)

- Born: August 13, 1932; Port Arthur, Ontario, Canada
- Died: October 2, 2023 (aged 91)
- Height: 6 ft 1 in (185 cm)
- Weight: 185 lb (84 kg; 13 st 3 lb)
- Position: Left wing
- Shot: Left
- Played for: Boston Bruins
- Playing career: 1952–1960

Gordon Allan "Junior" Wilson (August 13, 1932 – October 2, 2023) was a Canadian professional ice hockey player who played two playoff games in the National Hockey League with the Boston Bruins during the 1954–55 season. The rest of his career, which lasted from 1952 to 1960, was spent in the minor leagues. Wilson's father, Phat Wilson, was an amateur hockey player and is a member of the Hockey Hall of Fame.

== Hockey career ==
Wilson's professional hockey career started with the Hershey Bears, where he set a record of four goals and four assists in one game. Early in his career, he suffered a ligament tear in his knee, which kept him off the ice for a year; from which he recovered, and went on to play for the Boston Bruins.

== Off the ice ==
Wilson was an all-around gifted athlete, and in his early years played baseball and basketball, in addition to hockey. After retiring from hockey, he opened an insurance company in Thunder Bay, Ontario. He entered full retirement in 1999. Wilson died on October 2, 2023, at the age of 91.

== Career statistics ==
=== Regular season and playoffs ===
| | | | Regular season | | | | | Playoffs |
| Season | Team | League | GP | G | A | Pts | PIM | GP | G | A | Pts | PIM |
|---|---|---|---|---|---|---|---|---|---|---|---|---|
| 1950–51 | Port Arthur Bruins | TBJHL | — | — | — | — | — | — | — | — | — | — |
| 1951–52 | Fort William Hurricanes | M-Cup | — | — | — | — | — | 12 | 6 | 4 | 10 | 2 |
| 1952–52 | Port Arthur Bearcats | TBSHL | — | — | — | — | — | — | — | — | — | — |
| 1952–53 | Hershey Bears | AHL | 7 | 3 | 2 | 5 | 0 | — | — | — | — | — |
| 1953–54 | Hershey Bears | AHL | 4 | 1 | 0 | 1 | 0 | — | — | — | — | — |
| 1954–55 | Hershey Bears | AHL | 63 | 27 | 25 | 52 | 12 | — | — | — | — | — |
| 1954–55 | Boston Bruins | NHL | — | — | — | — | — | 2 | 0 | 0 | 0 | 0 |
| 1955–56 | Hershey Bears | AHL | 55 | 27 | 38 | 65 | 8 | — | — | — | — | — |
| 1956–57 | Quebec Aces | QSHL | 5 | 1 | 1 | 2 | 2 | — | — | — | — | — |
| 1956–57 | Vancouver Canucks | WHL | 14 | 0 | 1 | 1 | 0 | — | — | — | — | — |
| 1957–58 | Vancouver Canucks | WHL | 65 | 26 | 38 | 64 | 4 | — | — | — | — | — |
| 1958–59 | Vancouver Canucks | WHL | 40 | 12 | 15 | 27 | 0 | 3 | 0 | 1 | 1 | 2 |
| 1959–60 | Vancouver Canucks | WHL | 43 | 5 | 7 | 12 | 0 | — | — | — | — | — |
| 1959–60 | Quebec Aces | AHL | 15 | 1 | 0 | 1 | 2 | — | — | — | — | — |
| AHL totals | | | 144 | 59 | 65 | 124 | 22 | — | — | — | — | — |
| WHL totals | | | 162 | 43 | 61 | 104 | 4 | 3 | 0 | 1 | 1 | 2 |
| NHL totals | | | — | — | — | — | — | 2 | 0 | 0 | 0 | 0 |
