= Alex Wellington =

Canadian ice hockey player

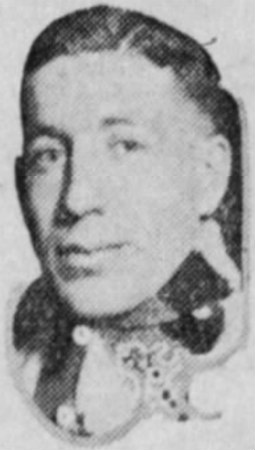
- Born: August 4, 1891 Port Arthur, Ontario
- Died: September 20, 1967 (aged 74) Burlington, New Jersey
- Position: Right wing
- Shot: Right
- Played for: Quebec Bulldogs
- Playing career: 1910–1921

Alexander Robertson "Duke" Wellington (August 4, 1893 – September 20, 1967) was a Canadian ice hockey player. Wellington played senior ice hockey and one game in the National Hockey League for the Quebec Bulldogs during the 1919–20 NHL season.

== Career ==
Wellington played junior hockey with the Port Arthur YMCA, moving up to senior hockey with the Port Arthur Stingrays in 1911. He continued in the Thunder Bay Senior League until 1915 when he played for St. Paul of the USAHA and seven games for Pittsburgh Duquesne Garden. Wellington moved to New York City in 1916 but was ruled ineligible to play there as a non-resident. The following season he played for the New York Wanderers of the USNHL. He played one game as a free agent for Quebec of the NHL in 1919–20, playing against the Ottawa Senators on January 10, 1920, but returned to New Larochelle-New York of the USAHA for the rest of the season. In 1920–21, he split his final season between the Port Arthur Bearcats and New Larochelle.

== Career statistics ==
=== Regular season and playoffs ===
			Regular season					Playoffs
Season	Team	League	GP	G	A	Pts	PIM	GP	G	A	Pts	PIM
1910–11	Port Arthur Thunder Bays	NOHL	5	9	0	9	6	2	1	0	1	0
1911–12	Port Arthur YMCA	TBJHL	7	3	0	3	—	—	—	—	—	—
1912–13	Port Arthur Thunder Bays	TBSHL	6	—	—	—	—	3	6	0	6	—
1913–14	Port Arthur Thunder Bays	TBSHL	9	29	0	29	—	2	2	0	2	—
1914–15	Thunder Bay Shuniahs	TBSHL	8	—	—	—	—	—	—	—	—	—
1915–16	Thunder Bay Shuniahs	TBSHL	2	2	0	2	6	—	—	—	—	—
1915–16	Pittsburgh Duquesne Garden	Exhib	6	2	2	4	0	—	—	—	—	—
1915–16	St. Paul Saints	NMHL	20	17	0	17	—	4	1	1	2	—
1917–18	New York Wanderers	USNHL	8	1	0	1	—	—	—	—	—	—
1919–20	New Larochelle-New York	USAHA	—	—	—	—	—	—	—	—	—	—
1919–20	Quebec Bulldogs	NHL	1	0	0	0	0	—	—	—	—	—
1920–21	Port Arthur Bear Cats	TBSHL	5	8	1	9	—	—	—	—	—	—
1920–21	New Larochelle-New York	USAHA	—	—	—	—	—	4	11	4	15	9
NHL totals			1	0	0	0	0	—	—	—	—	—

== See also ==
- List of players who played only one game in the NHL
