= 1939 Allan Cup =

Canadian senior ice hockey championship

The Allan Cup trophy

The 1939 Allan Cup was the Canadian senior ice hockey championship for the 1938–39 season.

== Final ==
Best of 5

- Port Arthur 6 Montreal 4
- Port Arthur 3 Montreal 1
- Montreal 6 Port Arthur 4
- Port Arthur 6 Montreal 5

Port Arthur Bearcats beat Montreal Royals 3–1 on series.
