= 1926 Allan Cup =

Canadian senior ice hockey championship

The Allan Cup trophy

The 1926 Allan Cup was the Canadian senior ice hockey championship for the 1925–26 season. The final was contested between the Port Arthur Bearcats and the Toronto Varsity Blues men's ice hockey. Port Arthur won the series two games to one, with one game tied.

== Final ==
- Port Arthur 1 University of Toronto 0
- University of Toronto 3 Port Arthur 1
- University of Toronto 3 Port Arthur 3
- Port Arthur 3 University of Toronto 2

Port Arthur Bearcats beat University of Toronto 2–1, 1 tie on series.
