= 1925 Allan Cup =

Canadian senior ice hockey championship

The Allan Cup was the championship trophy for amateur senior ice hockey in Canada.

The 1925 Allan Cup was the senior ice hockey championship for the Canadian Amateur Hockey Association (CAHA) during the 1924–25 season.

== Change in format ==
In February 1925, CAHA vice-president Frank Sandercock submitted a proposal to change the Allan Cup finals to a best-of-three games format instead of a two-game series decided on total goals scored. Public sentiment at the time was that in a two-game series, a lucky break was enough to decide the series, whereas a best-of-three format was less likely for that to happen. CAHA president Silver Quilty announced that the change was approved by a special vote and was put into effect for the 1925 competition.

== Final ==
Port Arthur Bearcats beat University of Toronto 2-0 on series.

- Port Arthur 4 University of Toronto 0
- Port Arthur 3 University of Toronto 2
