= 1929 Allan Cup =

Canadian senior ice hockey championship

The Allan Cup trophy

The 1929 Allan Cup was the Canadian senior ice hockey championship for the 1928–29 season.

== Final ==
Best of 3

- Port Arthur 1 Montreal 1
- Port Arthur 7 Montreal 2
- Port Arthur 3 Montreal 0

Port Arthur Bearcats beat Montreal St. Francois Xavier 2–0, 1 tie, on series.
