= Howie Morenz Memorial Game =

Hockey game held in Montréal

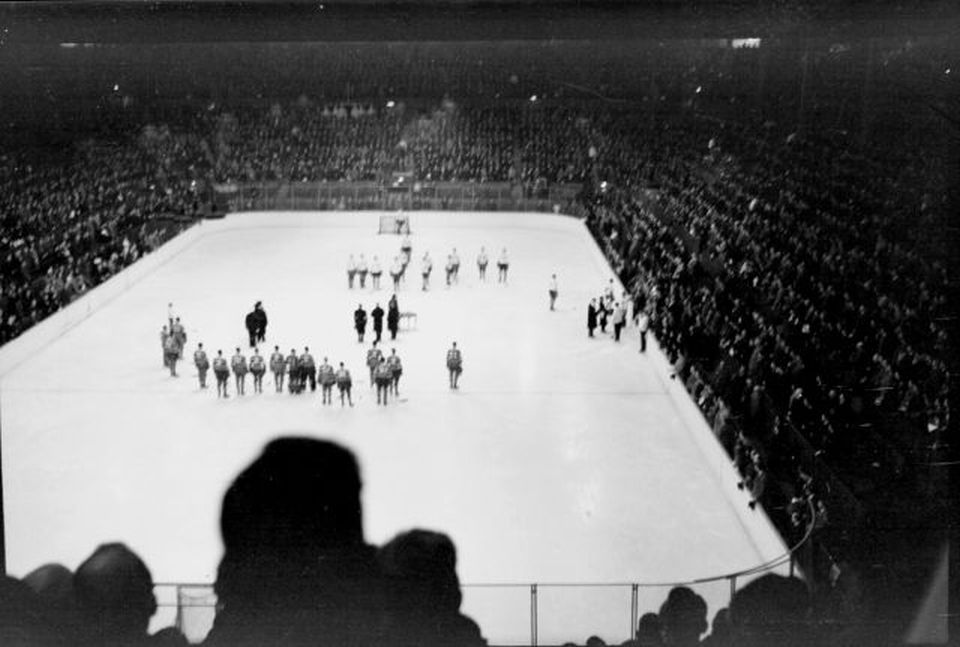
	1	2	3	Total
NHL All-Stars	2	1	3	6
Montreal All-Stars	1	0	4	5
- Date: November 2, 1937
- Arena: Montreal Forum
- City: Montreal, Quebec
- Attendance: 8,683

The Howie Morenz Memorial Game was a benefit held by the National Hockey League (NHL) to raise money to support the family of Montreal Canadiens player Howie Morenz, who died shortly after suffering a broken leg during a regular league game. The game featured the Montreal All-Stars, consisting of players with the Canadiens and Montreal Maroons playing against an all-star team of the top players on the remaining teams and was played at the Montreal Forum on November 2, 1937. The NHL All-Stars defeated the Montreal All-Stars 6–5 before 8,683 spectators.

== Morenz' injury and death ==
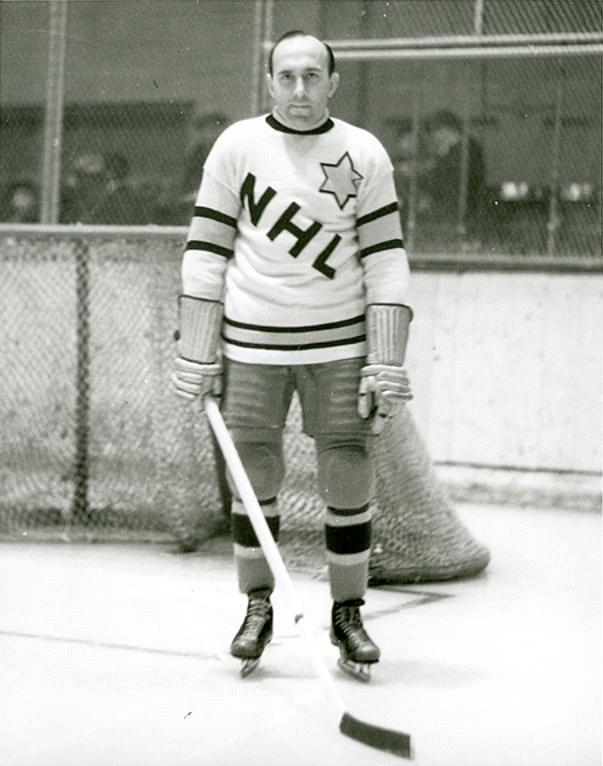
Morenz played in the Ace Bailey Benefit Game in 1934.

Howie Morenz established himself as one of the NHL's top players in the 1920s. He led the Montreal Canadiens to three Stanley Cup titles and won three Hart Trophies as the league's most valuable player. Popular throughout the league for his offensive ability and his end-to-end rushes, Morenz was considered the "Babe Ruth of hockey". Struggling financially, the Canadiens traded him to the Chicago Black Hawks in 1934 in a deal that was so unpopular in Montreal, local fans gave him a standing ovation when he scored against the Canadiens.

Morenz spent two seasons playing with the Black Hawks and the New York Rangers until Cecil Hart insisted that Montreal re-acquire their former star as a condition of him accepting the coaching position in 1936. Morenz was overjoyed to be returning to Montreal, and looked forward to playing for the Canadiens once again.

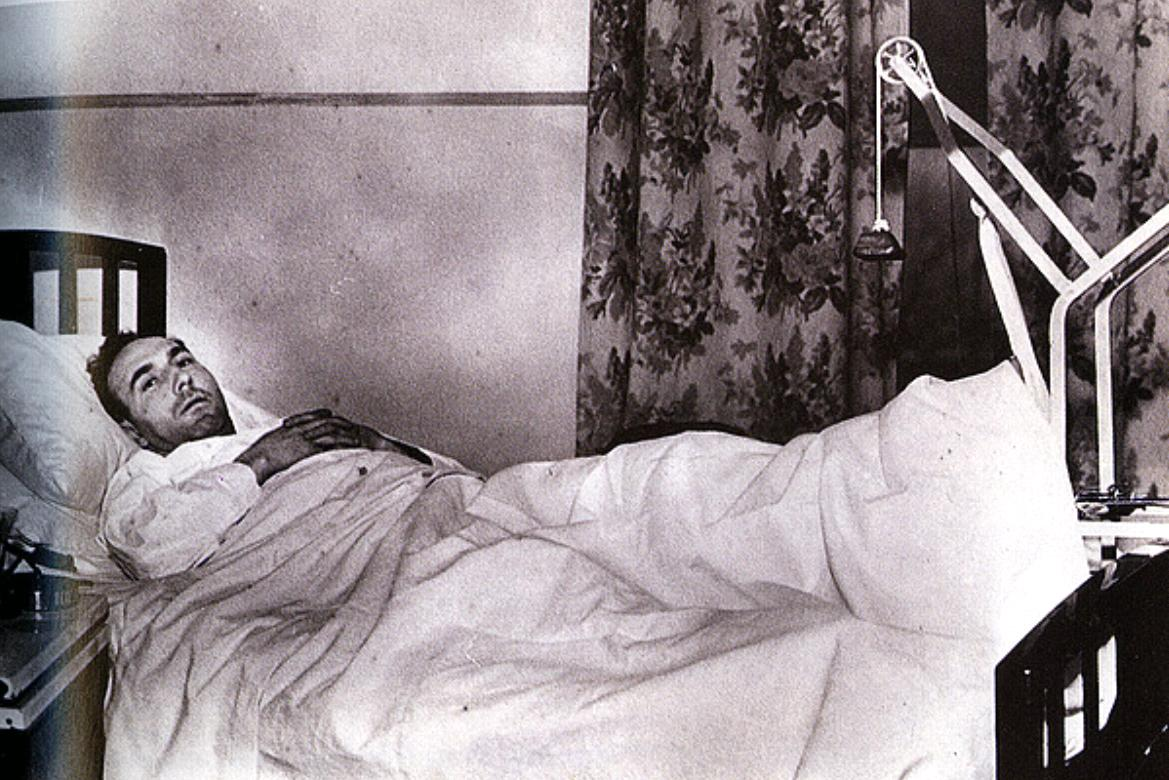
Morenz was bedridden following his injury.

His return did not last a full season, as on January 28, 1937, in a game against the Black Hawks at the Montreal Forum, Morenz was checked by Chicago's Earl Seibert as he attempted to rush into the offensive zone. His skate caught in the ice as he fell into the boards, resulting in a severe break to four bones in his leg. Convinced the injury had ended his career, Morenz fell into a deep depression and suffered a nervous breakdown. On March 8, just days before he was due to be released after five weeks in hospital, Morenz complained of chest pains, collapsed and died. His death was ruled the result of a coronary embolism, but teammate Aurel Joliat offered another explanation: "Howie loved to play hockey more than anyone ever loved anything, and when he realized that he would never play again, he couldn't live with it. I think Howie died of a broken heart."

While his body lay in state at centre ice at the Forum, 50,000 people came to pay their last respects. 10,000 people attended his funeral inside the Forum, while another 15,000 waited outside. The Canadiens retired his number 7, the first player to be so honoured by the team. Almost immediately after his injury, plans were made to play a benefit game to raise money for Morenz and his family, as the league had done in 1934 to benefit Ace Bailey. Morenz' death led the league to announce that a memorial game would be held on the eve of the 1937–38 NHL season.

== Memorial game ==
Held at the Montreal Forum on November 2, 1937, the Howie Morenz Memorial Game pitted a combined team of players from both the Montreal Canadiens and the Montreal Maroons against an all-star team made up of the top players from the league's remaining six teams. Canadiens' coach Cecil Hart occupied the same role for the Montreal All-Stars, while his Maroons counterpart, King Clancy, donned his skates for the game and played as a member of the team. It was the last time Clancy appeared on the ice as a player. Morenz' former linemates, Aurel Joliat and Johnny Gagnon played together, while Lionel Conacher, who had retired to enter Canadian politics after the 1937 season, also returned to play for the NHL All-Stars. Wilf Cude, of the Canadiens, played goal for the Montreal All-Stars, and was opposed in the NHL All-Stars net by Tiny Thompson, goaltender of the Boston Bruins.

The loudest cheers during the pre-game ceremonies was for Howie Morenz Jr., who skated with both teams during the warm up, taking shots on both goaltenders. Additionally, the league presented the trophies to its award winners for the 1936–37 season.

=== Game play ===
Johnny Gagnon of the Canadiens was the offensive star for the Montreal All-Stars, scoring two goals and an assist during the game. He opened the scoring two minutes into the game, but Tiny Thompson starred in goal for the NHL All-Stars in the first period as Montreal frequently applied pressure on his goal. At one point he stopped six Montreal shots in 30 seconds. Dit Clapper and Johnny Gottselig scored goals two minutes apart around the 13 and 15 minute marks to give the NHL All-Stars a 2–1 lead after one period. Red Horner was called for the only infraction of the game, receiving a hooking penalty in the first period. As he was serving the penalty, the referee skated by and apologized, noting with some mirth that Horner had been penalized by mistake, as he intended to call Sweeney Schriner instead.

The second period saw only one goal, by Cecil Dillon early in the frame to put the NHL All-Stars up 3–1. The period was dominated by the goaltenders, both of whom made numerous spectacular saves. Montreal's Pit Lepine closed the margin to one with a goal in the first minute of the third period before Lionel Conacher and Sweeney Schriner scored unassisted goals 43 seconds apart to extend the NHL All-Stars' lead to 5–2 at the three-minute mark of the period. The score remained the same until the NHL All-Stars extended their lead to 6–2 on a Marty Barry goal with five minutes to play.

As the NHL's regular season was set to begin the following night, many of the NHL All-Stars were required to leave early to catch the trains to their hometowns. Consequently, Jack Adams' squad was left with one substitute by the end of the game. The Montreal All-Stars took advantage of their depleted opponents in the closing minutes of the game, as Babe Siebert, Johnny Gagnon and Paul Haynes each scored in a three-minute span to close the gap to 6–5 in the final minute of play. Montreal continued to swarm the NHL All-Stars' net, and nearly tied the game in the dying moments, but were again turned aside by Thompson. The game ended in a 6–5 victory for the NHL All-Stars.

== Legacy ==
The crowd of 8,683 was a disappointment, and raised $11,447 for Morenz' widow and three children. Additional donations by the Canadiens organization, players and others raised the figure to $20,000. Among the donations, was $500 that former Canadiens owner Joe Cattarinich paid in an auction for Morenz' uniform. Cattarinich immediately gave the sweater to Morenz Jr. The Canadiens played a second benefit game, in Morenz' home town of Stratford, Ontario, a few nights later. That game, played before 3,000 fans, saw Montreal's younger players defeat the team's veterans by a 7–2 score. Morenz Jr. again received the loudest cheers from those in attendance. Towards the end of November, the NHL announced that the fund had grown to $26,595, and had been placed in trust.

== Rosters ==
	NHL All-Stars	Montreal All-Stars
Coach:	Jack Adams (Detroit Red Wings)	Cecil Hart (Montreal Canadiens)
Players:	1 – G Normie Smith (Detroit Red Wings); 2 – G Tiny Thompson (Boston Bruins); 3 – D Ebbie Goodfellow (Detroit Red Wings); 4 – D Eddie Shore (Boston Bruins); 5 – D Red Horner (Toronto Maple Leafs); 6 – D Dit Clapper (Boston Bruins); 7 – LW Sweeney Schriner (New York Americans); 8 – RW Charlie Conacher (Toronto Maple Leafs); 9 – LW Busher Jackson (Toronto Maple Leafs); 10 – C Art Chapman (New York Americans); 11 – RW Cecil Dillon (New York Rangers); 12 – LW Johnny Gottselig (Chicago Black Hawks); 14 – RW Mush March (Chicago Black Hawks); 15 – D Hap Day (New York Americans); 16 – C Frank Boucher (New York Rangers); 17 – C Marty Barry (Detroit Red Wings)	1 – G Wilf Cude (Montreal Canadiens); 2 – G Bill Beveridge (Montreal Maroons); 3 – D King Clancy (Montreal Maroons); 4 – LW Aurel Joliat (Montreal Canadiens); 5 – D Cy Wentworth (Montreal Maroons); 6 – D Walt Buswell (Montreal Canadiens); 8 – C Pit Lepine (Montreal Canadiens); 9 – RW Jimmy Ward (Montreal Maroons); 10 – RW Earl Robinson (Montreal Maroons); 11 – C Paul Haynes (Montreal Canadiens); 12 – C Russ Blinco (Montreal Maroons); 14 – LW Toe Blake (Montreal Canadiens); 15 – D Babe Siebert (Montreal Canadiens); 16 – RW Johnny Gagnon (Montreal Canadiens); 17 – LW Baldy Northcott (Montreal Maroons); 19 – D Georges Mantha (Montreal Canadiens); 20 – LW Dave Trottier (Montreal Maroons)

== Box score ==
NHL All-Stars	6–5 (2–1, 1–0, 3–4)	Montreal All-Stars	Montreal Forum; Montreal; Attendance: 8,683
	First period
	0–1	2:12 Gagnon (Blinco)	Referees:
Clapper (Conacher) 13:06	1–1		Mickey Ion
Gottselig (Chapman) 15:44	2–1		Eusebe Daignault
	Second period
Dillon (Gottselig, Barry) 4:30	3–1
	Third period
	3–2	0:51 Lepine (Ward, Blake)
Conacher (unassisted) 2:08	4–2
Schriner (unassisted) 2:51	5–2
Barry (Dillon, Shore) 15:00	6–2
	6–3	16:13 Siebert (Gagnon)
	6–4	17:03 Gagnon (Siebert, Mantha)
	6–5	19:15 Haynes (unassisted)
Horner (1st period)	Penalties	none
