= 1935 Stanley Cup Final =

1935 ice hockey championship series

	1	2	3	Total
Montreal Maroons	3*	3	4	3
Toronto Maple Leafs	2*	1	1	0
- * – Denotes overtime period(s)
- Location(s): Toronto: Maple Leaf Gardens (1, 2); Montreal: Montreal Forum (3)
- Format: best-of-five
- Coaches: Montreal: Tommy Gorman; Toronto: Dick Irvin
- Captains: Montreal: Hooley Smith; Toronto: Hap Day
- Dates: April 4–9, 1935
- Series-winning goal: Baldy Northcott (16:18, second)
- Hall of Famers: Maroons: Toe Blake (1966); Lionel Conacher (1994); Alec Connell (1958); Hooley Smith (1972); Maple Leafs: King Clancy (1958); Charlie Conacher (1961); Hap Day (1961); George Hainsworth (1961); Red Horner (1965); Busher Jackson (1971); Joe Primeau (1963); Coaches: Tommy Gorman (1963); Dick Irvin (1958, player)

The 1935 Stanley Cup Final was contested by the Montreal Maroons and the Toronto Maple Leafs. The Maroons won the series 3–0 to win their second and final Stanley Cup. The Maroons are the last defunct team to ever win the Cup, as the team disbanded three years later, and were also the last non-Original Six team to win the championship until the Philadelphia Flyers in 1974.

== Paths to the Finals ==
Toronto defeated the Boston Bruins in a best-of-five 3–1 to advance to the Finals.

The Maroons had to play a total-goals series; 1–0 against Chicago Black Hawks, and win a second two-game total-goals series 5–4 against the New York Rangers to advance to the Finals.

== Game summaries ==
Maroons manager-coach Tommy Gorman became the only coach to win successive Stanley Cup titles with two different teams after winning with the Chicago Black Hawks in the 1934 Stanley Cup Finals.

Maroons goaltender Alex Connell allowed just four goals in the three games.

April 4	Montreal Maroons	3–2	OT	Toronto Maple Leafs	Maple Leaf Gardens	Recap
No scoring		First period		No scoring
Earl Robinson (1) - 3:57; Cy Wentworth (2) - 19:12		Second period		14:28 - Frank Finnigan (1); 18:12 - King Clancy (1)
No scoring		Third period		No scoring
Dave Trottier (2) - 5:28		First overtime period		No scoring
Alex Connell		Goalie stats		George Hainsworth

April 6	Montreal Maroons	3–1	Toronto Maple Leafs	Maple Leaf Gardens	Recap
Earl Robinson (2) - pp - 15:44		First period	No scoring
Russ Blinco (2) - 16:47		Second period	7:31 - sh - Busher Jackson (3)
Baldy Northcott (3) - 3:27		Third period	No scoring
Alex Connell		Goalie stats	George Hainsworth

April 9	Toronto Maple Leafs	1–4	Montreal Maroons	Montreal Forum	Recap
No scoring		First period	19:35 - sh - Jimmy Ward (1)
Bill Thoms (2) - 12:59		Second period	16:18 - Baldy Northcott (4); 16:30 - Cy Wentworth (3)
No scoring		Third period	1:02 - Gus Marker (1)
George Hainsworth		Goalie stats	Alex Connell

Montreal won series 3–0

== Stanley Cup engraving ==
The 1935 Stanley Cup was presented to Maroons captain Hooley Smith by NHL President Frank Calder following the Maroons' 4–1 win over the Maple Leafs in game three.

The following Maroons players and staff had their names engraved on the Stanley Cup

1934–35 Montreal Maroons

=== Players ===
Centres

- 11 Bob Gracie
- 14 Russ Blinco
- 17 Norman Dutch Gainor

Wingers

- 4 Jimmy Ward
- 5 Lawrence Baldy Northcott
- 7 Reginald Hooley Smith (Captain)
- 8 Dave Trottier
- 8 Hector Toe Blake
- 9 August Gus Marker
- 10 Herb Cain
- 15 Earl Robinson
- 16 Sammy McManus

Defencemen

- 2 Marvin Cy Wentworth
- 3 Lionel Conacher
- 6 Stewart Evans
- 12 Allan Shields
- 19 Bill Miller
- 16 Bill MacKenzie (loaned to NY Rangers)

Goaltenders

- 1 Alex Connell

=== Coaching and administrative staff ===
- Donat Raymond (President/Owner),
- Thorad Arnold (Executive), Kenneth Daves (Executive), Bob McDougall (Executive)
- Tommy Gorman (Vice President/Manager-Coach)
- Bill O'Brien (Trainer)

=== Stanley Cup engraving ===
- Bill MacKenzie was loaned to the New York Rangers on 1935-01-29. In the Stanley Cup Semi-Finals, the Maroons defeated the Rangers, while MacKenzie played in a losing cause for the Rangers. He was included on the Stanley Cup and team picture. However, under NHL rules, MacKenzie was disqualified from winning the Stanley Cup because he was a member of the Rangers when the Maroons won it. MacKenzie only played five games for the Maroons in the 1934-35 season. He officially won the Stanley Cup with Chicago in 1938.
- In 1934 Tommy Gorman (Manager-Coach) led the Chicago Black Hawks to the Stanley Cup. In the off-season, Gorman was fired after a dispute with President/Owner Fredric McLaughlin. Montreal Maroons hired Gorman as (Manager-Coach), and he led the Maroons to the Stanley Cup. He became the only Manager and/or Coach to win back-to-back Stanley Cups with two different teams.
- Player Lionel Conacher won back-to-back cups with Chicago Black Hawks 1934 and Montreal Maroons in 1935.
- Montreal Maroons did not include any playoff scores in 1935.

== See also ==
- 1934–35 NHL season

== References & notes ==
- Diamond, Dan (2000). Total Stanley Cup. Toronto: Total Sports Canada. ISBN 978-1-892129-07-9.
- Podnieks, Andrew; Hockey Hall of Fame (2004). Lord Stanley's Cup. Bolton, Ont.: Fenn Pub. pp 12, 50. ISBN 978-1-55168-261-7
- "All-Time NHL Results". Archived from the original on July 24, 2017.

Preceded by Chicago Black Hawks; 1934	Montreal Maroons; Stanley Cup champions 1935	Succeeded by Detroit Red Wings; 1936
