= Sweeney Schriner =

Canadian ice hockey player (1911–1990)

- Hockey Hall of Fame, 1962
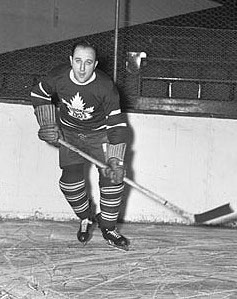
- Born: November 30, 1911 Saratov, Russian Empire
- Died: July 4, 1990 (aged 78) Calgary, Alberta, Canada
- Height: 6 ft 0 in (183 cm)
- Weight: 185 lb (84 kg; 13 st 3 lb)
- Position: Left wing
- Shot: Left
- Played for: New York Americans; Toronto Maple Leafs
- Playing career: 1933–1946

David "Sweeney" Schriner (November 30, 1911 – July 4, 1990) was a Russian-born Canadian professional ice hockey player who was a forward for 11 seasons in the National Hockey League (NHL) for the New York Americans and Toronto Maple Leafs. He was named Rookie of the Year in 1934–35 and was the NHL scoring leader in 1935–36 and 1936–37. Schriner was named to honorary all-star teams in numerous leagues throughout his career and played with the NHL All-Stars in the Howie Morenz Memorial Game in 1937. He won two Stanley Cup championships with the Maple Leafs, in 1941–42 and again in 1944–45. He was inducted into the Hockey Hall of Fame in 1962.

Though his family emigrated to Canada when he was an infant, Schriner was the first Russian-born player. (Note: Based on the current borders of Russia. He was the first European born player to win the Stanley Cup in 41-42, and again in 44-45 with Toronto. He was preceded by players born in areas of the Russian Empire that are not part of present-day Russia.) in NHL history. He grew up in Calgary, where he played baseball in addition to hockey, and returned to the city following his career. He often assisted players at the University of Calgary; the Canada West Universities Athletic Association awards the David "Sweeney" Schriner Trophy to its top scorer each season.

== Early life ==
Schriner was born in Saratov in the Russian Empire; however, his family emigrated to Calgary, Alberta, Canada when he was a month old. He was a natural athlete and in his youth played football and soccer competitively, but was especially fond of hockey and baseball. His hero growing up was a semi-professional baseball player by the name of Bob Sweeney. Schriner emulated Sweeney's playing style and as a result earned the nickname "L'il Sweeney", later shortened to just "Sweeney". Schriner preferred his nickname so much that he refused to respond to anyone who addressed him by his given name of David.

He learned the game of hockey on Calgary's outdoor rinks and played his minor hockey in the city. Schriner was a member of the Calgary Canadians junior team that appeared in the Memorial Cup playdowns in both 1930 and 1931, before he turned to senior hockey with the Calgary Bronks. He was a top scorer in the Alberta Senior Hockey League; his 19 goals and 22 points in 1931–32 and 22 goals and 26 points in 1932–33 were all league-leading totals.

== Playing career ==
The New York Americans invited Schriner to their training camp in 1933. They were impressed with his skating ability and signed him to a contract to play for their International Hockey League (IHL) affiliate, the Syracuse Stars. He appeared in 44 games with the Stars in 1933–34 where he totaled 18 goals and 11 assists. The Americans promoted him to their lineup to start the 1934–35 NHL season, and in doing so, made Schriner one of the first Russian-born players in NHL history. He quickly emerged as an offensive star; he was third in scoring among players in the Canadian Division at the midway point of the season. The NHL named him rookie of the year after he finished the year with 18 goals and 40 points.

Schriner continued to display his scoring ability in his second season. He scored four goals in a 5–5 tie with the Toronto Maple Leafs in the Americans' second game of the 1935–36 season, en route to a 45-point season that led the league in scoring. Additionally, the Canadian Press voted him to the first All-Star team for the season. He again led the league in scoring in 1936–37, with 46 points, and was named to the second All-Star team. Prior to the start of the 1937–38 NHL season, Schriner played for the NHL All-Stars at the Howie Morenz Memorial Game. The game was a fundraiser to support the family of Howie Morenz, a Montreal Canadiens star who died due to complications following a broken leg suffered the previous season. Schriner scored one goal in a 6–5 victory by the All-Stars over the Canadiens.

After five seasons in New York, the Americans dealt Schriner to the Maple Leafs in May 1939 in exchange for five players: Jimmy Fowler, Busher Jackson, Murray Armstrong, Doc Romnes and Buzz Boll. The five-for-one trade was unprecedented in the NHL at that time. Schriner remained an effective scorer in Toronto, where he earned his second first All-Star team selection of his career in 1940–41. One year later, he was instrumental in the Leafs' comeback in the 1942 Stanley Cup Final. He scored the tying and winning goals in Toronto's 3–1 victory in the seventh game against the Detroit Red Wings to win the Stanley Cup, a moment described as being one of his greatest thrills in hockey. It was Toronto's first championship in ten years, and the Maple Leafs became the first team in NHL history to overcome a 3–0 series deficit to win a best-of-seven playoff series with their victory over Detroit.

Frustrated by what he felt was too much individualism in the game, Schriner contemplated retiring from professional hockey in favour of taking up a coaching position in Alberta's senior league. He had a change of heart and returned to the Leafs for the 1942–43 NHL season. Schriner again announced his intention to leave the game in June 1943, this time citing past injuries to his knee and dissatisfaction with Leafs' owner Conn Smythe's contract offer for the following season.

Leaving Toronto, Schriner returned to Calgary and joined an Army/Navy team in the Alberta Garrison League for the 1943–44 campaign, where he was named to the military league's second all-star team at left wing. Following the local season, Schriner signed with the Vancouver St. Regis of the Pacific Coast Hockey League for their playoff run. He scored nine points in three games before a protest by the team's opponent resulted in both his and Vancouver's suspension by the Canadian Amateur Hockey Association (CAHA). He was still considered a professional player, and thus ineligible to play senior hockey. Schriner appealed the decision, citing his position as a member of the Royal Canadian Naval Reserve. Rules of the time that automatically restored the amateur status of all active military personnel, however the CAHA ruled that a reserve officer was not the same as soldier on active duty. Schriner's participation in the series did not impact the outcome of the series as Vancouver was eliminated by the New Westminster Lodestars, who won all three games of the series.

Schriner returned to the NHL and the Maple Leafs in 1944–45. He played two more years in Toronto before announcing his retirement for the third time in 1946. He returned to Alberta to coach the Lethbridge Maple Leafs of the Western Canada Senior Hockey League (WCSHL) for two seasons before once again returning to the ice as a player with the Regina Capitals. He finished fourth in WCSHL scoring in 1948–49 and was named to the league's second all-star team. Schriner and the Capitals won the WCSHL and Western Canadian championships, but fell to the Ottawa Senators in the 1949 Allan Cup final.

Following the season, Schriner ended his playing career for the fourth and final time. He coached a season of senior hockey in Nova Scotia, after which he returned to Alberta where he briefly coached the Crow's Nest Pass Coalers in the Western Canada Junior Hockey League in 1951.

"He was the best left-winger I ever saw. That includes everybody: Frank Mahovlich, Busher Jackson, Bobby Hull, everybody"

— Maple Leafs' owner Conn Smythe, describing Schriner.

Schriner was a durable player for much of his career. He played every game for his teams in his first six professional seasons, failing to miss a contest until his first year with the Maple Leafs. He was regarded as one of the best puck handlers of his time, and his 201 career NHL goals ranked him as one of the game's top goal scorers of his era. He was inducted into the Hockey Hall of Fame in 1962, and the Canada West Universities Athletic Association awards the David "Sweeney" Schriner Trophy to its top scorer each season.

== Personal life ==
Following his retirement, Schriner returned to his Calgary home and worked in the city's oil and gas industry until retiring from that career in 1977. He and his wife Marie had two children, Norman and Joanne, and he had one sister, Mary. Schriner remained active within sport, working with the Calgary Oldtimers Hockey Association and making frequent visits to the University of Calgary to speak with young players who viewed him as a role model. He became an avid curler and golfer in his retirement.

== Career statistics ==
			Regular season					Playoffs
Season	Team	League	GP	G	A	Pts	PIM	GP	G	A	Pts	PIM
1928–29	Calgary Canadians	CCJHL	—	—	—	—	—	—	—	—	—	—
1929–30	Calgary Canadians	CCJHL	—	—	—	—	—	—	—	—	—	—
1929–30	Calgary Canadians	M-Cup	—	—	—	—	—	5	2	0	2	8
1930–31	Calgary Canadians	CCJHL	2	2	0	2	0	—	—	—	—	—
1930–31	Calgary Canadians	M-Cup	—	—	—	—	—	8	10	4	14	19
1931–32	Calgary Bronks	ASHL	18	19	3	22	32	3	1	2	3	0
1931–32	Calgary Bronks	A-Cup	—	—	—	—	—	11	8	5	13	12
1932–33	Calgary Bronks	ASHL	15	22	4	26	8	5	3	1	4	6
1932–33	Calgary Bronks	A-Cup	—	—	—	—	—	2	2	2	4	2
1933–34	Syracuse Stars	IHL	44	17	11	28	28	4	0	0	0	0
1934–35	New York Americans	NHL	48	18	22	40	6	—	—	—	—	—
1935–36	New York Americans	NHL	48	19	26	45	8	5	3	1	4	2
1936–37	New York Americans	NHL	48	21	25	46	17	—	—	—	—	—
1937–38	New York Americans	NHL	48	21	17	38	22	6	1	0	1	0
1938–39	New York Americans	NHL	48	13	31	44	20	2	0	0	0	30
1939–40	Toronto Maple Leafs	NHL	39	11	15	26	10	9	1	3	4	4
1940–41	Toronto Maple Leafs	NHL	48	24	14	38	6	7	2	1	3	4
1941–42	Toronto Maple Leafs	NHL	47	20	16	36	21	13	6	3	9	10
1942–43	Toronto Maple Leafs	NHL	37	19	17	36	13	4	2	2	4	0
1943–44	Calgary Combines	WCSHL	10	9	9	18	14	3	3	2	5	4
1943–44	Vancouver St. Regis	PCHL	—	—	—	—	—	3	6	3	9	0
1944–45	Toronto Maple Leafs	NHL	26	22	15	37	10	13	3	1	4	4
1945–46	Toronto Maple Leafs	NHL	47	13	6	19	15	—	—	—	—	—
1948–49	Regina Capitals	WCSHL	36	26	27	53	30	8	10	2	12	0
1948–49	Regina Capitals	A-Cup	—	—	—	—	—	14	3	8	11	18
NHL totals			484	201	204	405	148	59	18	11	29	54

== Notes ==
Preceded by Charlie Conacher	NHL Scoring Champion; 1936, 1937	Succeeded by Gordie Drillon
Preceded by Russ Blinco	Rookie of the Year; 1935	Succeeded by Mike Karakas
Preceded by Red Dutton	New York Americans captain 1936–39	Succeeded by Charlie Conacher
