= Paul Schaeffer =

American ice hockey player

- Born: November 7, 1911 Hinckley, Minnesota, United States
- Died: September 28, 1989 (aged 77)
- Height: 5 ft 10 in (178 cm)
- Weight: 190 lb (86 kg; 13 st 8 lb)
- Position: Defence
- Shot: Right
- Played for: Chicago Black Hawks
- Playing career: 1934–1939

Paul Raymond "Butch" Schaeffer (November 7, 1911 – September 28, 1989) was an American ice hockey player who played five games in the National Hockey League with the Chicago Black Hawks during the 1936–37 season. The rest of his career, which lasted from 1934 to 1939, was spent in the minor leagues. Schaeffer was born in Hinckley, Minnesota.

== Career statistics ==
=== Regular season and playoffs ===
			Regular season					Playoffs
Season	Team	League	GP	G	A	Pts	PIM	GP	G	A	Pts	PIM
1934–35	Chicago Baby Ruth	USAHA	2	0	0	0	0	—	—	—	—	—
1935–36	Chicago Baby Ruth	USAHA	—	—	—	—	—	—	—	—	—	—
1936–37	Chicago Black Hawks	NHL	5	0	0	0	6	—	—	—	—	—
1937–38	Eveleth Rangers	USHL	—	—	—	—	—	—	—	—	—	—
1938–39	Eveleth Rangers	USHL	27	0	6	6	25	5	0	0	0	8
NHL totals			5	0	0	0	6	—	—	—	—	—
