= Ace Bailey Benefit Game =

First all-star game in National Hockey League

	1	2	3	Total
NHL All-Stars	1	2	0	3
Toronto Maple Leafs	2	2	3	7
- Date: February 14, 1934
- Arena: Maple Leaf Gardens
- City: Toronto, Ontario
- Attendance: 14,074

The Ace Bailey Benefit Game was the first all-star game in National Hockey League (NHL) history. It was played on February 14, 1934, at Maple Leaf Gardens in Toronto to raise money to support Ace Bailey, whose career was ended by a violent hit by Eddie Shore during a game earlier in the 1933–34 season. The Toronto Maple Leafs defeated a team made up of the top players from the rest of the league, 7–3, before a crowd of 14,074 spectators.

The game was held two months following the incident between the Boston Bruins and the Toronto Maple Leafs at the Boston Garden that resulted in Bailey's injuries. Toronto's Red Horner dazed Shore with a heavy hit. Intent on revenge, Shore thought he was skating at Horner, but instead knocked Bailey over. Bailey flew through the air, and suffered a fractured skull when he landed on his head. Shore himself was knocked unconscious in the melee that resulted.

Though it was initially feared he would not survive his injuries, Bailey recovered enough to appear at the benefit game. He presented gifts and shook the hands of each player as they were introduced. Among them was Eddie Shore himself, who was playing for the NHL all-stars. The crowd fell silent as Shore approached, then erupted into loud cheering when Bailey extended his hand toward his attacker. The Maple Leafs announced during the ceremonies that no player on their team would again wear Bailey's number 6, marking the first time in NHL history that a team retired a player's uniform number.

== Bailey's injury ==
The incident between Ace Bailey and Eddie Shore occurred in the Boston Garden during the second period of a regular league game between the Toronto Maple Leafs and Boston Bruins on December 12, 1933. Having taken two penalties in quick succession, the Maple Leafs were playing short handed, and sent Bailey, Red Horner and King Clancy out to defend against Boston's power play. During that sequence, Clancy upended Shore with a hard check as the latter player rushed up the ice. Angry, dazed, and thinking he was going after Clancy, Shore rushed at Bailey intent on revenge. He hit Bailey hard from the side, sending the stricken player flying through the air. Bailey struck the ice head first and lapsed into convulsions. Furious, Horner asked Shore what he was doing, and when met with only a smile in response, knocked Shore out cold with one punch.

Both players were carried off the ice, where Shore first regained consciousness. He was able to reach Bailey, who briefly regained consciousness himself, and attempted to apologize. Bailey was able to respond with "it's all part of the game" before again passing out. As Maple Leafs owner Conn Smythe attempted to reach his team's dressing room to find out the status of Bailey, he was accosted by angry Bruins fans (at the time, the visitors dressing room was on the main concourse before entering the arena), one of whom accused Bailey of faking his injury. An angry Smythe punched the fan in the mouth, and was later charged with assault.

Bailey was rushed to hospital in Boston with a fractured skull where neurosurgeons worked through the night to save his life. His injuries were so severe that doctors gave him only hours to live. Distraught over his son's injuries, Bailey's father boarded a train bound for Boston carrying a revolver, telling everyone he met of his intent to kill Shore. When Smythe found out about this, he contacted his assistant general manager, Frank Selke, for help. Selke got in touch with a friend of his who worked in the Boston Police, who met Bailey's father at a hotel and talked the man out of his plan before returning him to Toronto.

Authorities in Boston made it known that they intended to charge Shore with manslaughter if the player died. Bailey held on, though his life hung in the balance for several days. Following several surgeries, doctors eventually found reason to hope Bailey would survive. He amazed observers by showing a steady recovery, and by mid January was well enough to be transferred home to Toronto.

The NHL quickly absolved the referees of blame, while Shore protested that he was in a dazed state and not conscious of his actions at the time. League president Frank Calder suspended Horner until January 1, 1934, a period of six games, and Shore indefinitely for their roles in the incident. When he was assured that Bailey would survive, Calder set Shore's suspension at 16 games. Bailey never played another game.

== All-Star benefit ==
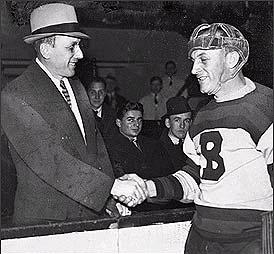
Bailey (left) shakes the hand of Shore prior to the game.

As Bailey recovered, Ottawa Journal sports editor Walter Gilhooly proposed in an open letter that a benefit game be held. The Maple Leafs, Montreal Maroons and Ottawa Senators called a meeting of the board of governors to determine who would pay for Bailey's recovery. Following the meeting, the governors announced that an exhibition would be held in Toronto between the Maple Leafs and a team of the top players from the rest of the league to raise money for Bailey and his family. The all-star team was selected by a three-man committee consisting of league president Calder, New York Rangers owner Frank Patrick and league director Thomas Arnold.

For the first all-star game in NHL history, two players were selected from each of the other eight NHL teams, while Rangers coach Lester Patrick was named the coach. For his starting lineup, Patrick chose Charlie Gardiner in goal, Eddie Shore and Ching Johnson on defence, and Howie Morenz, Bill Cook and Aurel Joliat as his forwards. Patrick expressed confidence that the fans in Toronto would welcome Shore's participation.

The game was held on February 14, 1934, and featured a lavish pre-game ceremony that first saw the players assemble at centre ice to have photographs taken in their regular sweaters. They were then presented with their all-star jerseys by Frank Calder, Lester Patrick, Leaf officials and Ace Bailey himself. Gardiner stepped out first to receive his number 1 uniform, and was then followed by Shore, who wore number 2. The crowd of over 14,000 fans went completely silent as Shore slowly skated toward Bailey. After a moment, Bailey extended his hand towards Shore, and the crowd erupted in loud cheering as the two shook hands.

The players were presented with medals and windbreakers by officials of the Canadiens and the Maple Leafs, and the fans cheered each player as they were introduced, even those who were previously unpopular with the Toronto crowd. The ceremony concluded with Conn Smythe presenting Bailey with his own sweater, and announcing to the crowd that no Leafs player would again wear Bailey's number 6. It marked the first time in NHL history that a team retired a player's uniform number.

=== Game play ===
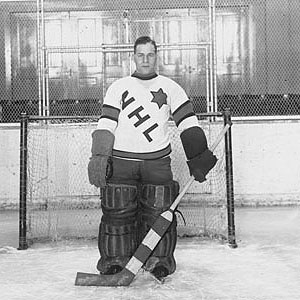
Charlie Gardiner was the goaltender for the NHL All-Stars

Bailey stepped out to ice to drop the puck for the ceremonial face off, after which the game began. The Leafs' Charlie Conacher, who had been questionable before the game with an already infected knee, was forced to leave the game after being hit early, but otherwise the match-up was a considerable departure from a regular league game and featured little physical play. Shore, who was visibly nervous before the game about the reception he would receive from the crowd, was cheered and supported when he rushed with the puck. The first goal was scored by Toronto's Baldy Cotton, and was quickly followed up with a goal by Busher Jackson to put Toronto up 2–0 before Nels Stewart rounded out the offence in the first period with a goal for the All-Stars.

After Toronto took a 3–1 lead early in the second, Morenz scored the most impressive goal on the night, accepting a pass from Joliat at full speed as he raced around a Maple Leafs defenceman before shooting the puck over goaltender George Hainsworth's shoulder. Frank Finnigan brought the All-Stars even at the midway point of the period, but Toronto ended the period with a 4–3 lead after the referees mistakenly ruled a Hap Day shot that hit the post as a goal.

Though the All-Stars took many shots on Hainsworth in the third period, they were unable to score. Busher Jackson scored to put the Maple Leafs up by two early in the period, and after Patrick abandoned any attempt at defence by placing five forwards on the ice in a bid to tie the game, Toronto added two late goals to emerge with a 7–3 victory.

== Legacy ==
The proceeds from the game totaled $20,909, which was given to Bailey. Additionally, he was presented with $6,000 raised by the Bruins in a separate benefit. Prior to the game, Bailey presented Calder with a trophy commissioned by the Maple Leafs and bearing his name that the team hoped would go to the winner of an annual all-star game that would benefit injured players. That failed to materialize, though the NHL held two additional benefit games in the following five years. Memorial games were held for the families of Howie Morenz in 1937 and Babe Siebert in 1939. It was not until 1947 that the idea became an annual event when the 1st National Hockey League All-Star Game was held in Toronto.

Though Bailey never played again, he remained in the Maple Leafs organization for nearly a half century, working as a penalty box official for the team. He was inducted into the Hockey Hall of Fame in 1975. Shore remained an NHL regular until 1940 then operated a minor league hockey team. He was inducted into the Hockey Hall of Fame in 1947.

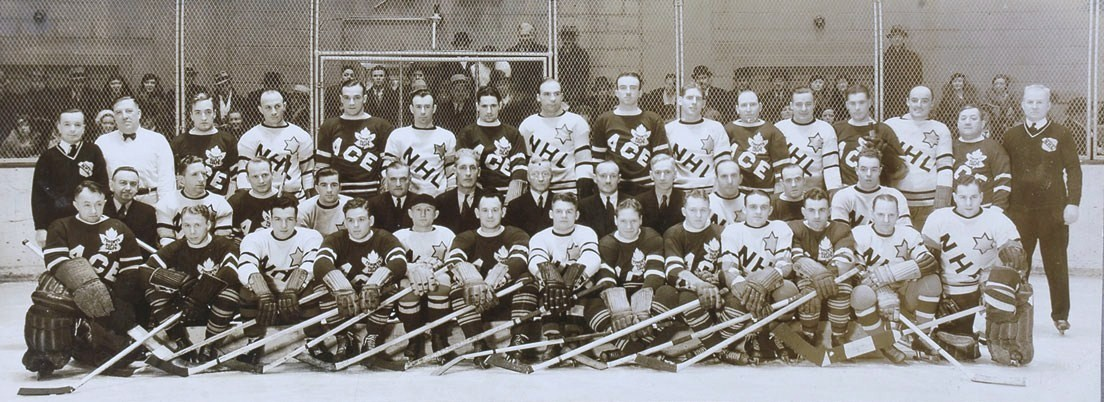
The game's participants pose as a group

== Rosters ==
	NHL All-Stars	Toronto Maple Leafs
Coach:	Lester Patrick (New York Rangers)	Dick Irvin
Players:	1 – G Charlie Gardiner (Chicago Black Hawks); 2 – D Eddie Shore (Boston Bruins); 3 – RW Frank Finnigan (Ottawa Senators); 4 – LW Aurèle Joliat (Montreal Canadiens); 5 – LW Herbie Lewis (Detroit Red Wings); 6 – D Ching Johnson (New York Rangers); 7 – D Lionel Conacher (Chicago Black Hawks); 9 – C Nels Stewart (Boston Bruins); 10 – C Hooley Smith (Montreal Maroons); 11 – C Norman Himes (New York Americans); 12 – D Red Dutton (New York Americans); 14 – RW Larry Aurie (Detroit Red Wings); 15 – RW Bill Cook (New York Rangers); 16 – C Howie Morenz (Montreal Canadiens); 17 – D Al Shields (Ottawa Senators); 18 – RW Jimmy Ward (Montreal Maroons)	1 – G George Hainsworth; 2 – D Red Horner; 3 – D Alex Levinsky; 4 – D Hap Day; 5 – C Andy Blair; 7 – D King Clancy; 8 – LW Baldy Cotton; 9 – RW Charlie Conacher; 10 – C Joe Primeau; 11 – LW Busher Jackson; 12 – LW Hec Kilrea; 14 – C Bill Thoms; 15 – RW Ken Doraty; 16 – RW Charlie Sands; 17 – LW Buzz Boll

== Box score ==
All-Stars	3–7 (1–2, 2–2, 0–3)	Toronto	Maple Leaf Gardens; Toronto; Attendance: 14,074
	First period
	0–1	4:00 Cotton (Blair, Doraty)	Referees:
	0–2	7:11 Jackson (Kilrea, Primeau)	Bobby Hewitson
Stewart (Ward) 14:15	1–2		Mike Rodden
	Second period
	1–3	1:33 Jackson (Thoms)
Morenz (Joliat) 8:24	2–3
Finnigan (Stewart) 9:15	3–3
	3–4	11:13 Day (unassisted)
	Third period
	3–5	4:05 Kilrea (Jackson)
	3–6	18:26 Doraty (Blair)
	3–7	18:41 Blair (unassisted)
none	Penalties	none

== See also ==
- Addie Joss Benefit Game
- Tim Murnane Benefit Game
