= Russ Blinco =

Canadian ice hockey player

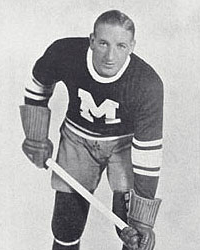
- Born: March 12, 1906 Grand-Mère, Quebec, Canada
- Died: June 28, 1982 (aged 76) Bedford, Quebec, Canada
- Height: 5 ft 10 in (178 cm)
- Weight: 171 lb (78 kg; 12 st 3 lb)
- Position: Centre
- Shot: Left
- Played for: Montreal Maroons; Chicago Black Hawks
- Playing career: 1932–1939

Russell Percival Blinco (March 12, 1906 – June 28, 1982) was a Canadian professional ice hockey centre who played six seasons in the National Hockey League for the Montreal Maroons and Chicago Black Hawks. He won the Stanley Cup with the Maroons in 1934–35.

== Playing career ==
Blinco began his hockey career with the local Grand-Mere Maroons in 1928–29. In 1929–30, he joined the Brooklyn Crescents of the USAHA, for whom he played for three seasons. He joined the Windsor Bulldogs of the International Hockey League in 1932–33; he also played part of that season with the Springfield Indians in the Canadian-American Hockey League. In 1933–34, Blinco recorded 11 points in 16 games with the Bulldogs, then signed on with the Montreal Maroons in mid-season.

In his first season with the Maroons, Blinco recorded 23 points in 34 games, and received the Calder Memorial Trophy for Rookie of the Year. In 1934–35, he helped the Maroons reach the Stanley Cup Final and defeat the Toronto Maple Leafs in three games to win the Stanley Cup. In 1937, he took part in the Howie Morenz Memorial Game. In 1938 he was traded to the Chicago Black Hawks along with teammates Baldy Northcott and Earl Robinson for $30,000 cash. He retired from playing after one season with the Hawks. Blinco was the first NHL player to wear spectacles while playing.

He died on June 28, 1982 in Bedford, Quebec, Canada, aged 76.

== Awards and achievements ==
- Calder Memorial Trophy winner in 1934.
- Stanley Cup champion in 1935.
- Played in Howie Morenz Memorial Game.

== Career statistics ==
=== Regular season and playoffs ===
| | | | Regular season | | | | | Playoffs |
| Season | Team | League | GP | G | A | Pts | PIM | GP | G | A | Pts | PIM |
|---|---|---|---|---|---|---|---|---|---|---|---|---|
| 1926–27 | McGill University | MCHL | 9 | 0 | 1 | 1 | 0 | — | — | — | — | — |
| 1927–28 | McGill University | OQAA | — | — | — | — | — | — | — | — | — | — |
| 1928–29 | Grand'Mere Maroons | PIHL | 5 | 4 | 0 | 4 | 2 | — | — | — | — | — |
| 1929–30 | Brooklyn Crescents | USAHA | — | — | — | — | — | — | — | — | — | — |
| 1930–31 | Brooklyn Crescents | USAHA | — | — | — | — | — | — | — | — | — | — |
| 1931–32 | Brooklyn Crescents | USAHA | — | — | — | — | — | — | — | — | — | — |
| 1932–33 | Windsor Bulldogs | IHL | 28 | 13 | 10 | 23 | 12 | — | — | — | — | — |
| 1932–33 | Springfield Indians | Can-Am | 13 | 2 | 2 | 4 | 0 | — | — | — | — | — |
| 1933–34 | Windsor Bulldogs | IHL | 16 | 6 | 5 | 11 | 4 | — | — | — | — | — |
| 1933–34 | Montreal Maroons | NHL | 31 | 14 | 9 | 23 | 2 | 4 | 0 | 1 | 1 | 0 |
| 1934–35 | Montreal Maroons | NHL | 48 | 13 | 14 | 27 | 4 | 7 | 2 | 2 | 4 | 2 |
| 1935–36 | Montreal Maroons | NHL | 46 | 13 | 10 | 23 | 10 | 3 | 0 | 0 | 0 | 0 |
| 1936–37 | Montreal Maroons | NHL | 48 | 6 | 12 | 18 | 2 | 5 | 1 | 0 | 1 | 2 |
| 1937–38 | Montreal Maroons | NHL | 47 | 10 | 9 | 19 | 4 | — | — | — | — | — |
| 1938–39 | Chicago Black Hawks | NHL | 48 | 3 | 12 | 15 | 2 | — | — | — | — | — |
| NHL totals | | | 268 | 59 | 66 | 125 | 24 | 19 | 3 | 3 | 6 | 4 |

== Transactions ==
- December 18, 1932 - Traded to the Montreal Maroons (Windsor Bulldogs-IHL) by the New York Rangers after Springfield Indians (Can-Am) franchise folded.
- September 15, 1932 - Traded to the Chicago Black Hawks by the Montreal Maroons with Baldy Northcott and Earl Robinson for $30,000 cash.

| Preceded by Carl Voss | NHL Rookie of the Year; 1934 | Succeeded by Sweeney Schriner |
