= Earl Robinson (ice hockey) =

Canadian ice hockey player

- Born: March 11, 1907 Montreal, Quebec, Canada
- Died: September 12, 1986 (aged 79)
- Height: 5 ft 10 in (178 cm)
- Weight: 160 lb (73 kg; 11 st 6 lb)
- Position: Right Wing/Centre
- Shot: Right
- Played for: Montreal Maroons; Chicago Black Hawks; Montreal Canadiens
- Playing career: 1927–1944

Henry Earle Robinson (March 11, 1907 — September 12, 1986) was a Canadian professional ice hockey right winger who played eleven seasons in the National Hockey League for the Montreal Maroons, Chicago Black Hawks and Montreal Canadiens between 1928 and 1940. He won the Stanley Cup with the Maroons in 1935.

== Playing career ==
Born in Montreal, Quebec, Robinson played nine seasons for his hometown Montreal Maroons. He had his best season offensively for the Maroons in 1934–35 scoring a career high 17 goals and 35 points in 47 games. He would play for the Maroons beginning in 1928–29 up until the team ceased operating at the conclusion of the 1937-38 NHL season. The following year he was traded to the Chicago Blackhawks and recorded 15 points in 47 games. Robinson played his last season in the National Hockey League the following year for his other hometown team the Montreal Canadiens. He would spend parts of the next three years in the American Hockey League and retired from professional hockey in 1942.

== Career statistics ==
=== League play ===
			Regular season					Playoffs
Season	Team	League	GP	G	A	Pts	PIM	GP	G	A	Pts	PIM
1925–26	Montreal Royal Bank	MCBHL	9	5	2	7	4	—	—	—	—	—
1925–26	Montreal Royals	MCJHL	9	9	6	15	4	4	17	2	19	7
1926–27	Montreal Royal Bank	MCBHL	4	7	4	11	2	—	—	—	—	—
1926–27	Montreal Victorias	MCHL	5	4	1	5	4	—	—	—	—	—
1927–28	Philadelphia Arrows	Can-Am	34	18	7	25	21	—	—	—	—	—
1928–29	Montreal Maroons	NHL	38	2	1	3	4	—	—	—	—	—
1929–30	Montreal Maroons	NHL	31	1	2	3	10	4	0	0	0	0
1929–30	Windsor Bulldogs	IHL	5	3	2	5	0	—	—	—	—	—
1930–31	Windsor Bulldogs	IHL	48	44	19	63	18	6	6	4	10	0
1931–32	Montreal Maroons	NHL	26	0	3	3	4	—	—	—	—	—
1931–32	Windsor Bulldogs	IHL	21	10	4	14	8	6	2	3	5	4
1932–33	Montreal Maroons	NHL	44	15	9	24	6	2	0	0	0	0
1933–34	Montreal Maroons	NHL	47	12	16	28	14	4	2	0	2	0
1934–35	Montreal Maroons	NHL	48	17	18	35	41	7	2	2	4	0
1935–36	Montreal Maroons	NHL	39	6	14	20	27	3	0	0	0	0
1936–37	Montreal Maroons	NHL	47	16	18	34	19	5	1	2	3	0
1937–38	Montreal Maroons	NHL	39	4	7	11	13	—	—	—	—	—
1938–39	Chicago Black Hawks	NHL	47	9	6	15	13	—	—	—	—	—
1939–40	Montreal Canadiens	NHL	11	1	4	5	2	—	—	—	—	—
1939–40	New Haven Eagles	IAHL	25	11	14	25	2	3	2	2	4	0
1940–41	New Haven Eagles	AHL	56	16	19	35	19	2	0	0	0	0
1941–42	New Haven Eagles	AHL	48	13	20	33	2	2	0	0	0	2
1941–42	Providence Reds	AHL	1	0	0	0	0	—	—	—	—	—
1942–43	Toronto Research Colonels	OHA Sr	10	13	16	29	6	—	—	—	—	—
1942–43	Toronto Staffords	TIHL	16	13	5	18	8	2	2	0	2	2
1943–44	Toronto Army Daggers	OHA Sr	1	0	0	0	0	—	—	—	—	—
1942–43	Toronto Army Shamrocks	TIHL	25	13	11	24	20	4	3	1	4	2
NHL totals			419	83	98	181	153	25	5	4	9	0

== Awards and achievements ==
- 1934–35 - Stanley Cup Champion - Montreal Maroons
- 1937–38 - Played in Howie Morenz Memorial Game
- 1939–40 - Played in Babe Siebert Memorial Game

== Transactions ==
- Traded by the Montreal Maroons with Russ Blinco and Baldy Northcott to the Chicago Black Hawks for $30,000, September 15, 1938.
- Sold by the Chicago Black Hawks to the Montreal Canadiens, October 11, 1939.
