= 1936–37 NHL transactions =

The following is a list of all team-to-team transactions that occurred in the National Hockey League (NHL) during the 1936–37 NHL season. It lists which team each player has been traded to and for which player(s) or other consideration(s), if applicable.

== Transactions ==
May 6, 1936	To Toronto Maple Leafs Turk Broda	To Detroit Red Wings $8,000 cash
May 7, 1936	To Toronto Maple Leafs cash	To Chicago Black Hawks Andy Blair
September, 1936; Exact date unknown	To Montreal Maroons Sammy McManus	To New York Rangers cash
September 1, 1936	To Montreal Canadiens Howie Morenz	To New York Rangers cash
September 6, 1936	To New York Americans Joe Lamb $10,000 cash	To Montreal Maroons Carl Voss
September 10, 1936	To Boston Bruins Bun Cook	To New York Rangers cash
September 10, 1936	To Montreal Maroons rights to Buddy O'Connor	To Montreal Canadiens Sammy McManus
September 10, 1936	To Boston Bruins Leroy Goldsworthy; Sammy McManus $10,000 cash	To Montreal Canadiens Roger Jenkins; Babe Siebert
September 15, 1936	To New York Americans loan of Al Shields	To Montreal Maroons cash
October 7, 1936	To New York Americans John Gallagher	To Detroit Red Wings $6,000 cash
October 7, 1936	To Montreal Maroons Gerry Carson	To Montreal Canadiens rights to George Brown
October 22, 1936	To New York Americans Lorne Chabot	To Montreal Maroons cash
October 26, 1936	To Boston Bruins Hooley Smith	To Montreal Maroons future considerations^{1} (Gerry Shannon)
November 29, 1936	To New York Americans cash	To Detroit Red Wings John Gallagher
December 3, 1936	To Montreal Maroons Paul Runge	To Montreal Canadiens Bill MacKenzie
December 7, 1936	To Boston Bruins cash	To Montreal Maroons Max Kaminsky
December 19, 1936	To Boston Bruins Walter Kalbfleisch	To New York Americans Ted Graham
December 19, 1936	To Boston Bruins cash	To New York Americans Nels Stewart
December 29, 1936	To Toronto Maple Leafs loan of Bill Kendall	To Chicago Black Hawks loan of Pep Kelly for remainder of 1936-37 season
January 25, 1937	To Boston Bruins loan of Al Shields future considerations^{2} (Terry Reardon) (Tom Cooper)	To New York Americans Joe Jerwa

Notes

1. Trade completed on December 4, 1936.
2. Trade completed on October 17, 1937.
