= List of National Hockey League retired numbers =

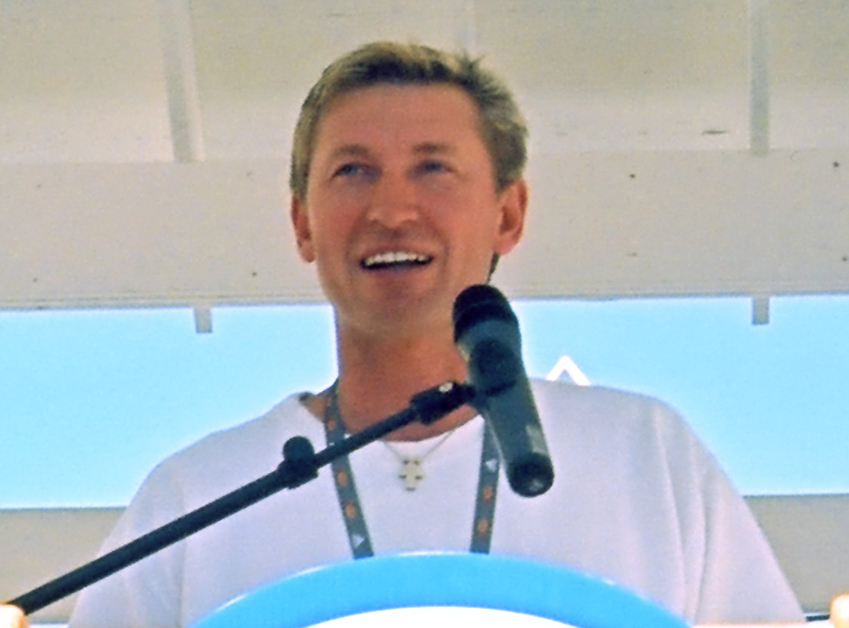
Wayne Gretzky's #99 was retired league-wide in 2000

This is a complete list of numbers retired by the National Hockey League (NHL). A retired number is a jersey number that is taken out of circulation by a team as a way of honouring a former member of that team who wore that number; after the number's retirement, members of that team are not permitted to wear the number on their jerseys unless by permission of the original number holder.

The first team to retire a number was the Toronto Maple Leafs, which retired Ace Bailey's number 6 on February 14, 1934, prior to an All-Star game organized in his honour. The NHL currently has 186 retired numbers, 10 former retirements and 25 honoured numbers. Most of the numbers retired by the Hartford Whalers and Quebec Nordiques were put back in circulation when those franchises relocated and became the Carolina Hurricanes and Colorado Avalanche, respectively, although the Hurricanes keep Gordie Howe's number 9 unofficially retired. The Minnesota North Stars' two retired numbers were carried over when that franchise relocated to become the Dallas Stars, and remain retired today. During its existence, the Arizona Coyotes had a policy of retaining the numbers retired when the franchise was the Winnipeg Jets but reversed it after the Phoenix Coyotes were sold and became the Arizona Coyotes; these were retroactively classified as honoured numbers as part of the Arizona Coyotes Ring of Honor. Honoured numbers are similar to retired numbers, except that they remain available for use by other players. Presently, only the Calgary Flames, the St. Louis Blues, and the Winnipeg Jets (the latter honouring the players of the original Jets) employ this designation.

Wayne Gretzky's number 99 was retired league-wide in 2000; Gretzky's former teams the Edmonton Oilers and Los Angeles Kings also separately retired his number.

As of November 2026, only the Utah Mammoth and the Winnipeg Jets have no retired numbers. Five teams have retired six numbers that are not those of former players from their franchises: the Ottawa Senators, Florida Panthers (x2), Minnesota Wild, Seattle Kraken, and Vegas Golden Knights.

Twelve numbers have been retired by a team in honour of two different players.

Nine players have had their number retired by two different NHL teams:

- Bobby Hull – Chicago Blackhawks and the original Winnipeg Jets
- Gordie Howe – Detroit Red Wings and Hartford Whalers
- Wayne Gretzky – Edmonton Oilers and Los Angeles Kings (also retired league-wide)
- Ray Bourque – Boston Bruins and Colorado Avalanche
- Mark Messier – Edmonton Oilers and New York Rangers
- Patrick Roy – Colorado Avalanche and Montreal Canadiens
- Tim Horton – Buffalo Sabres and Toronto Maple Leafs
- Red Kelly – Detroit Red Wings and Toronto Maple Leafs
- Scott Niedermayer – Anaheim Ducks and New Jersey Devils

== Retired numbers ==
Key

Elected to the Hockey Hall of Fame
Number retired league-wide
Never played for that particular franchise
Number retired by a team for multiple players

Italics denote numbers that will be retired during the 2026–27 NHL season.

Name	Team	No.	Date	Ref
Sid Abel	Detroit Red Wings	12	April 29, 1995	
Daniel Alfredsson	Ottawa Senators	11	December 29, 2016	
Glenn Anderson	Edmonton Oilers	9	January 18, 2009	
Syl Apps	Toronto Maple Leafs	10	October 15, 2016	
George Armstrong	Toronto Maple Leafs	10	October 15, 2016	
Barry Ashbee	Philadelphia Flyers	4	October 13, 1977	
Ace Bailey	Toronto Maple Leafs	6	February 14, 1934	
Bill Barber	Philadelphia Flyers	7	October 11, 1990	
Bill Barilko	Toronto Maple Leafs	5	October 17, 1992	
Andy Bathgate	New York Rangers	9	February 22, 2009	
Jean Beliveau	Montreal Canadiens	4	October 9, 1971	
Patrice Bergeron	Boston Bruins	37	December 1, 2026	
Rob Blake	Los Angeles Kings	4	January 17, 2015	
Mike Bossy	New York Islanders	22	March 3, 1992	
Émile Bouchard	Montreal Canadiens	3	December 4, 2009	
Ray Bourque	Boston Bruins	77	October 4, 2001	
Ray Bourque	Colorado Avalanche	77	November 24, 2001	
Johnny Bower	Toronto Maple Leafs	1	October 15, 2016	
Michel Briere	Pittsburgh Penguins	21	January 5, 2001	
Rod Brind'Amour	Carolina Hurricanes	17	February 18, 2011	
Turk Broda	Toronto Maple Leafs	1	October 15, 2016	
Martin Brodeur	New Jersey Devils	30	February 9, 2016	
Neal Broten	Dallas Stars	7	February 7, 1998	
Dustin Brown	Los Angeles Kings	23	February 11, 2023	
Johnny Bucyk	Boston Bruins	9	March 13, 1980	
Pavel Bure	Vancouver Canucks	10	November 2, 2013	
Zdeno Chara	Boston Bruins	33	January 15, 2026	
Chris Chelios	Chicago Blackhawks	7	February 25, 2024	
King Clancy	Toronto Maple Leafs	7	October 15, 2016	
Dit Clapper	Boston Bruins	5	February 12, 1947	
Wendel Clark	Toronto Maple Leafs	17	October 15, 2016	
Bobby Clarke	Philadelphia Flyers	16	November 15, 1984	
Paul Coffey	Edmonton Oilers	7	October 18, 2005	
Charlie Conacher	Toronto Maple Leafs	9	October 15, 2016	
Yvan Cournoyer	Montreal Canadiens	12	November 12, 2005	
Ken Daneyko	New Jersey Devils	3	March 24, 2006	
Hap Day	Toronto Maple Leafs	4	October 15, 2016	
Alex Delvecchio	Detroit Red Wings	10	November 10, 1991	
Marcel Dionne	Los Angeles Kings	16	November 8, 1990	
Ken Dryden	Montreal Canadiens	29	January 29, 2007	
Patrik Elias	New Jersey Devils	26	February 24, 2018	
Phil Esposito	Boston Bruins	7	December 3, 1987	
Tony Esposito	Chicago Blackhawks	35	November 20, 1988	
Bernie Federko	St. Louis Blues	24	March 16, 1991	
Sergei Fedorov	Detroit Red Wings	91	January 12, 2026	
Frank Finnigan (Note: Finnigan did not play for the current Senators franchise, which does not retain the history of the original team. The number he wore was retired because he played for the original Senators franchise and was active in campaigning to bring a new franchise to Ottawa.)	Ottawa Senators	8	October 8, 1992	
Adam Foote	Colorado Avalanche	52	November 2, 2013	
Peter Forsberg	Colorado Avalanche	21	October 8, 2011	
Ron Francis	Carolina Hurricanes	10	January 28, 2006	
Grant Fuhr	Edmonton Oilers	31	October 9, 2003	
Bob Gainey	Montreal Canadiens	23	February 23, 2008	
Danny Gare	Buffalo Sabres	18	November 22, 2005	
Mike Gartner	Washington Capitals	11	December 28, 2008	
Bob Gassoff	St. Louis Blues	3	October 1, 1977	
Bernie Geoffrion	Montreal Canadiens	5	March 11, 2006	
Ryan Getzlaf	Anaheim Ducks	15	January 30, 2027	
Eddie Giacomin	New York Rangers	1	March 15, 1989	
Rod Gilbert	New York Rangers	7	October 14, 1979	
Clark Gillies	New York Islanders	9	December 7, 1996	
Doug Gilmour	Toronto Maple Leafs	93	October 15, 2016	
Bill Goldsworthy	Dallas Stars	8	February 15, 1992	
Butch Goring	New York Islanders	91	February 29, 2020	
Adam Graves	New York Rangers	9	February 3, 2009	
Wayne Gretzky	All NHL teams	99	February 6, 2000	
Wayne Gretzky	Edmonton Oilers	99	October 1, 1999	
Wayne Gretzky	Los Angeles Kings	99	October 9, 2002	
Vic Hadfield	New York Rangers	11	December 2, 2018	
Glenn Hall	Chicago Blackhawks	1	November 20, 1988	
Al Hamilton	Edmonton Oilers	3	October 10, 1980	
Doug Harvey	Montreal Canadiens	2	October 26, 1985	
Dominik Hasek	Buffalo Sabres	39	January 13, 2015	
Milan Hejduk	Colorado Avalanche	23	January 6, 2018	
Lionel Hitchman	Boston Bruins	3	February 22, 1934	
Tim Horton	Buffalo Sabres	2	January 5, 1996	
Tim Horton	Toronto Maple Leafs	7	October 15, 2016	
Marian Hossa	Chicago Blackhawks	81	November 20, 2022	
Gordie Howe	Detroit Red Wings	9	March 12, 1972	
Mark Howe	Philadelphia Flyers	2	March 6, 2012	
Harry Howell	New York Rangers	3	February 22, 2009	
Wayne Huizenga (Note: The Florida Panthers retired the number 37 to honor former owner Wayne Huizenga, who owned the team between 1993 and 2001.)	Florida Panthers	37	January 19, 2018	
Bobby Hull	Chicago Blackhawks	9	December 18, 1983	
Brett Hull	St. Louis Blues	16	December 5, 2006	
Dale Hunter	Washington Capitals	32	March 11, 2000	
Jarome Iginla	Calgary Flames	12	March 2, 2019	
Jaromir Jagr	Pittsburgh Penguins	68	February 18, 2024	
Paul Kariya	Anaheim Ducks	9	October 21, 2018	
Red Kelly	Toronto Maple Leafs	4	October 15, 2016	
Red Kelly	Detroit Red Wings	4	February 1, 2019	
Ted Kennedy	Toronto Maple Leafs	9	October 15, 2016	
Dave Keon	Toronto Maple Leafs	14	October 15, 2016	
Miikka Kiprusoff	Calgary Flames	34	March 2, 2024	
Mikko Koivu	Minnesota Wild	9	March 13, 2022	
Anze Kopitar	Los Angeles Kings	11	February 24, 2027	
Jari Kurri	Edmonton Oilers	17	October 6, 2001	
Yvon Labre	Washington Capitals	7	November 7, 1981	
Elmer Lach	Montreal Canadiens	16	December 4, 2009	
Guy Lafleur	Montreal Canadiens	10	February 16, 1985	
Pat LaFontaine	Buffalo Sabres	16	March 3, 2006	
Rod Langway	Washington Capitals	5	November 26, 1997	
Guy Lapointe	Montreal Canadiens	5	November 8, 2014	
Vincent Lecavalier	Tampa Bay Lightning	4	February 10, 2018	
Brian Leetch	New York Rangers	2	January 24, 2008	
Jere Lehtinen	Dallas Stars	26	November 24, 2017	
Mario Lemieux	Pittsburgh Penguins	66	November 19, 1997 (Note: Unretired from December 27, 2000 to his second retirement on January 24, 2006.)	
Nicklas Lidstrom	Detroit Red Wings	5	March 6, 2014	
Trevor Linden	Vancouver Canucks	16	December 17, 2008	
Eric Lindros	Philadelphia Flyers	88	January 18, 2018	
Ted Lindsay	Detroit Red Wings	7	November 10, 1991	
Kevin Lowe	Edmonton Oilers	4	November 5, 2021	
Henrik Lundqvist	New York Rangers	30	January 28, 2022	
Roberto Luongo	Florida Panthers	1	March 7, 2020	
Al MacInnis	St. Louis Blues	2	April 9, 2006	
Keith Magnuson	Chicago Blackhawks	3	November 12, 2008	
Frank Mahovlich	Toronto Maple Leafs	27	October 15, 2016	
Patrick Marleau	San Jose Sharks	12	February 25, 2023	
Rick Martin	Buffalo Sabres	7	November 15, 1995	
Bill Masterton	Dallas Stars	19	January 17, 1987	
Lanny McDonald	Calgary Flames	9	March 17, 1990	
Mark Messier	New York Rangers	11	January 12, 2006	
Mark Messier	Edmonton Oilers	11	February 27, 2007	
Rick Middleton	Boston Bruins	16	November 29, 2018	
Stan Mikita	Chicago Blackhawks	21	October 19, 1980	
Ryan Miller	Buffalo Sabres	30	January 19, 2023	
Minnesota Wild fans (Note: The Minnesota Wild retired this number to honor their fans prior to their first game on Oct 11, 2000.)	Minnesota Wild	1	October 11, 2000	
Mike Modano	Dallas Stars	9	March 8, 2014	
Dickie Moore	Montreal Canadiens	12	November 12, 2005	
Howie Morenz	Montreal Canadiens	7	November 2, 1937	
Rick Nash	Columbus Blue Jackets	61	March 5, 2022	
Markus Naslund	Vancouver Canucks	19	December 11, 2010	
Scott Niedermayer	Anaheim Ducks	27	February 17, 2019	
Scott Niedermayer	New Jersey Devils	27	December 16, 2011	
Cam Neely	Boston Bruins	8	January 12, 2004	
Chris Neil	Ottawa Senators	25	February 17, 2023	
Bob Nystrom	New York Islanders	23	April 1, 1995	
Willie O'Ree (Note: O'Ree is elected to the Hockey Hall of Fame as a builder.)	Boston Bruins	22	January 18, 2022	
Terry O'Reilly	Boston Bruins	24	October 24, 2002	
Bobby Orr	Boston Bruins	4	January 9, 1979	
Bernie Parent	Philadelphia Flyers	1	October 11, 1979	
Gilbert Perreault	Buffalo Sabres	11	October 17, 1990	
Chris Phillips	Ottawa Senators	4	February 18, 2020	
Pierre Pilote	Chicago Blackhawks	3	November 12, 2008	
Barclay Plager	St. Louis Blues	8	March 24, 1981	
Bob Plager	St. Louis Blues	5	February 2, 2017	
Jacques Plante	Montreal Canadiens	1	October 7, 1995	
Denis Potvin	New York Islanders	5	February 1, 1992	
Chris Pronger	St. Louis Blues	44	January 17, 2022	
Jean Ratelle	New York Rangers	19	February 25, 2018	
Henri Richard	Montreal Canadiens	16	December 10, 1975	
Maurice Richard	Montreal Canadiens	9	October 6, 1960	
Mike Richter	New York Rangers	35	February 4, 2004	
Pekka Rinne	Nashville Predators	35	February 24, 2022	
Rene Robert	Buffalo Sabres	14	November 15, 1995	
Larry Robinson	Montreal Canadiens	19	November 19, 2007	
Luc Robitaille	Los Angeles Kings	20	January 20, 2007	
Patrick Roy	Colorado Avalanche	33	October 28, 2003	
Patrick Roy	Montreal Canadiens	33	November 22, 2008	
Joe Sakic	Colorado Avalanche	19	October 1, 2009	
Borje Salming	Toronto Maple Leafs	21	October 15, 2016	
Denis Savard	Chicago Blackhawks	18	March 19, 1998	
Serge Savard	Montreal Canadiens	18	November 18, 2006	
Terry Sawchuk	Detroit Red Wings	1	March 6, 1994	
Milt Schmidt	Boston Bruins	15	March 13, 1980	
Seattle Kraken fans (Note: The number honors both the franchise being the 32nd to join the NHL, and the 32,000 fans who placed deposits for tickets on the first day they were available.)	Seattle Kraken	32	October 23, 2021	
Daniel Sedin	Vancouver Canucks	22	February 12, 2020	
Henrik Sedin	Vancouver Canucks	33	February 12, 2020	
Teemu Selanne	Anaheim Ducks	8	January 11, 2015	
Eddie Shore	Boston Bruins	2	April 1, 1947	
Darryl Sittler	Toronto Maple Leafs	27	October 15, 2016	
Billy Smith	New York Islanders	31	February 20, 1993	
Stan Smyl	Vancouver Canucks	12	November 3, 1991	
Martin St. Louis	Tampa Bay Lightning	26	January 13, 2017	
Eric Staal	Carolina Hurricanes	12	January 12, 2025	
Scott Stevens	New Jersey Devils	4	February 3, 2006	
Mats Sundin	Toronto Maple Leafs	13	October 15, 2016	
Brian Sutter	St. Louis Blues	11	December 30, 1988	
Dave Taylor	Los Angeles Kings	18	April 3, 1995	
Joe Thornton	San Jose Sharks	19	November 23, 2024	
John Tonelli (Note: At the time of its retirement, number 27 was worn by Anders Lee, and is allowed to continue wearing the number with Tonelli's blessing.)	New York Islanders	27	February 21, 2020	
Bill Torrey (Note: The Florida Panthers retired the number 93 to honor president and general manager Bill Torrey because the team was founded in 1993. Torrey was elected to the Hockey Hall of Fame as a builder in 1995.)	Florida Panthers	93	October 23, 2010	
Bryan Trottier	New York Islanders	19	October 20, 2001	
Rogie Vachon	Los Angeles Kings	30	February 14, 1985	
Mike Vernon	Calgary Flames	30	February 6, 2007	
2017 Las Vegas shooting victims (Note: This number was retired in honor of the 58 people who were killed in the 2017 Las Vegas shooting.)	Vegas Golden Knights	58	March 31, 2018	
Glen Wesley	Carolina Hurricanes	2	February 17, 2009	
Steve Yzerman	Detroit Red Wings	19	January 2, 2007	
Sergei Zubov	Dallas Stars	56	January 28, 2022	

== Unofficially retired numbers ==
These numbers are not considered officially retired, but have still been removed from circulation.

Key

Elected to the Hockey Hall of Fame

Name Chase	Team	No.	Date	Ref
Larry Aurie	Detroit Red Wings	6	1938	
Luc Bourdon	Vancouver Canucks	28	2008	
Steve Chiasson	Carolina Hurricanes	3	1999	
Pavel Datsyuk	Detroit Red Wings	13	2016	
Theoren Fleury	Calgary Flames	14	1999	
Jean-Sebastien Giguere	Anaheim Ducks	35	2010	
Gordie Howe	Carolina Hurricanes	9	1997	
Artūrs Irbe	Carolina Hurricanes	1	2004	
Olaf Kolzig	Washington Capitals	37	2009	
Vladimir Konstantinov	Detroit Red Wings	16	1997	
Pelle Lindbergh	Philadelphia Flyers	31	1985	
Wayne Maki	Vancouver Canucks	11	1974	
Chris Osgood	Detroit Red Wings	30	2011	
Rick Rypien	Vancouver Canucks	37	2011	
Ryan Smyth	Edmonton Oilers	94	2014	
Josef Vasicek	Carolina Hurricanes	63	2011	
Henrik Zetterberg	Detroit Red Wings	40	2018	

== Honoured numbers ==
Unlike retired numbers, these honoured numbers were not necessarily withdrawn from circulation. Some of the numbers honoured remain in circulation, while others have been removed from circulation without being officially retired.

A few uniform numbers of the original Winnipeg Jets were honoured by both the current Jets (originally the Atlanta Thrashers) and the Arizona Coyotes, the relocated incarnation of the original Jets. In April 2024, the Coyotes were deactivated by the NHL, while the franchise records of the original Jets were transferred to the current Jets franchise in September 2026.

Key

Elected to the Hockey Hall of Fame
Foster Hewitt Memorial Award winner
Honoured as a broadcaster for the franchise
Number honoured by a team for multiple players

Name	Team	No.	Date	Ref
Red Berenson	St. Louis Blues	7	March 7, 2011	
Randy Carlyle	Winnipeg Jets	8	February 11, 2020	
Colby Cave	Edmonton Oilers	12	April 14, 2020	
Johnny Gaudreau	Columbus Blue Jackets	13	October 15, 2024	
Dale Hawerchuk	Winnipeg Jets	10	November 14, 2017	
Anders Hedberg	Winnipeg Jets	15	October 19, 2016	
Bobby Hull (Note: Number was retired by the original Winnipeg Jets, but not yet carried over to the present-day Winnipeg Jets.)	Winnipeg Jets	9	October 19, 2016	
Matiss Kivlenieks	Columbus Blue Jackets	80	October 14, 2021	
Ab McDonald	Winnipeg Jets	14	February 26, 2019	
Al MacInnis	Calgary Flames	2	February 27, 2012	
Joe Mullen	St. Louis Blues	7	March 7, 2011	
Joe Nieuwendyk	Calgary Flames	25	March 7, 2014	
Ulf Nilsson	Winnipeg Jets	14	October 19, 2016	
Teppo Numminen	Winnipeg Jets	27	November 17, 2022	
Rod Phillips (Note: Honoured as a broadcaster by the Edmonton Oilers, with the number referring to the 3,542 games called as a broadcaster for the Oilers.)	Edmonton Oilers	3542	March 29, 2011	
Teemu Selanne	Winnipeg Jets	13	November 17, 2022	
Lars-Erik Sjoberg	Winnipeg Jets	4	February 26, 2019	
Thomas Steen	Winnipeg Jets	25	February 11, 2020	
Keith Tkachuk	St. Louis Blues	7	March 7, 2011	
Garry Unger	St. Louis Blues	7	March 7, 2011	
Doug Wickenheiser	St. Louis Blues	14	January 21, 1999	

== Former retired numbers ==
It is very rare for a team to reissue a retired number, and usually requires a special circumstance, such as a number being requested for a family member (such as Bobby Hull asking the Phoenix Coyotes to allow his son Brett to wear Bobby's number 9), or the player for whom the number was retired coming out of retirement himself (such as Mario Lemieux).

In cases of franchise relocation, the handling of existing retired numbers is at the discretion of team management. They may decide to continue honouring the retired numbers, such as the Dallas Stars and Phoenix/Arizona Coyotes, or they may choose to make a "fresh start" and reissue the numbers, as the Colorado Avalanche and Carolina Hurricanes have done.

The Hurricanes have an unusual exception with regards to Gordie Howe's number 9. While the Hurricanes have not made any formal recognition of the Hartford Whalers' retirement of the number, they have kept the number out of circulation since their 1997 relocation.

The Red Wings and Larry Aurie's number 6 are also something of a unique situation, as the number was officially retired, then un-retired so that his cousin, Cummy Burton, could wear it, much as the Jets/Coyotes did for the Hulls. It was then re-retired until 2000, when the Red Wings ordered it removed from the NHL's Official Guide and Record Book. Despite the unretirement, number 6 is still not available to be worn in Detroit.

Key

Elected to the Hockey Hall of Fame

Name	Team	No.	Date	Ref
Larry Aurie	Detroit Red Wings	6	1939	
Shane Doan	Arizona Coyotes	19	February 24, 2019	
Michel Goulet	Quebec Nordiques	16	March 16, 1995	
Gordie Howe	Hartford Whalers	9	February 18, 1981	
Bobby Hull	Winnipeg Jets (1972–1996)	9	February 19, 1989	
Rick Ley	Hartford Whalers	2	December 26, 1982	
John McKenzie	Hartford Whalers	19	1979	
Peter Stastny	Quebec Nordiques	26	February 4, 1996	
Thomas Steen	Winnipeg Jets (1972–1996)	25	May 6, 1995	
Marc Tardif	Quebec Nordiques	8	November 1, 1983	
J. C. Tremblay	Quebec Nordiques	3	October 28, 1979	

== Former honoured numbers ==
The Arizona Coyotes relocated to Salt Lake City, Utah in 2024 and became the Utah Mammoth. The Mammoth are officially recognized as an expansion team that does not own the history of the Coyotes.

Key

Elected to the Hockey Hall of Fame
Never played for that particular franchise

Name	Team	No.	Date	Ref
Leighton Accardo (Note: Leighton Accardo never played for the franchise, but was a member of the Arizona Kachinas youth hockey program, a fan of the Coyotes, and signed a one-day contract with the team in 2019 before she died at nine years old from cancer on November 24, 2020. Her youth hockey number of 49 was placed into the Ring of Honor and the Coyotes wore an "LA49" decal on their helmets throughout the 2020–21 season.)	Arizona Coyotes	49	April 17, 2021	
Wayne Gretzky	Arizona Coyotes	99	October 8, 2005	
Dale Hawerchuk	Arizona Coyotes	10	April 5, 2007	
Bobby Hull	Arizona Coyotes	9	October 8, 2005	
Teppo Numminen	Arizona Coyotes	27	January 30, 2010	
Jeremy Roenick	Arizona Coyotes	97	February 11, 2012	
Thomas Steen	Arizona Coyotes	25	January 21, 2006	
Keith Tkachuk	Arizona Coyotes	7	December 23, 2011	
