= Eddie Shore =

Canadian ice hockey player (1902–1985)

- Hockey Hall of Fame, 1947
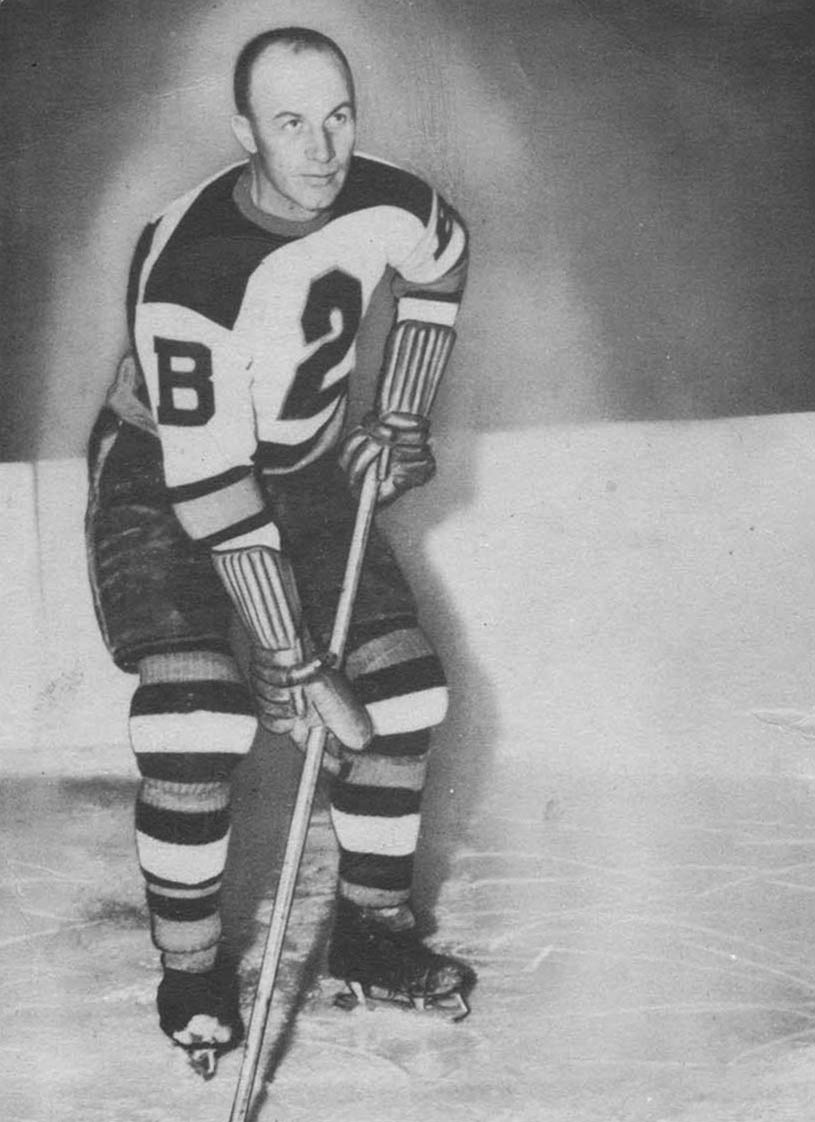
- Shore with the Boston Bruins in 1939
- Born: November 25, 1902 Fort Qu'Appelle, North-West Territories, Canada
- Died: March 16, 1985 (aged 82) Springfield, Massachusetts, US
- Height: 5 ft 11 in (180 cm)
- Weight: 190 lb (86 kg; 13 st 8 lb)
- Position: Defence
- Shot: Right
- Played for: Regina Capitals; Edmonton Eskimos; Boston Bruins; New York Americans
- Playing career: 1924–1943

Edward William Shore (November 25, 1902 – March 16, 1985) was a Canadian professional ice hockey defenceman, principally for the Boston Bruins of the National Hockey League, and the longtime owner of the Springfield Indians of the American Hockey League. Iconic for his aggressiveness, toughness and defensive skill, he was called both "Old Blood and Guts" and "the Edmonton Express". In 2017, Shore was named one of the '100 Greatest NHL Players' in history.

Shore won the Hart Trophy as the NHL's most valuable player four times, the most of any defenceman; only Wayne Gretzky and Gordie Howe have won it more often. After the league began naming NHL All-Star teams at the end of Shore's fifth season, Shore was honoured as a First Team All-Star in seven of his last nine seasons, while being named a Second Team All-Star one of the other seasons; in the remaining season he missed over half the schedule due to injury. A bruiser known for his violence, Shore set a then-NHL record for 165 penalty minutes in his second season.

== Early life ==
Shore was born to Katherine and John T. Shore in rural Saskatchewan and grew up in the small town of Cupar, which had only an outdoor rink for him to skate on. Shore had six siblings, and his family owned a ranch, which helped him develop a strong athletic foundation. As a youngster, Shore was not considered the most talented player even in his own household—his older brother Aubrey held that title. Eddie did not begin taking hockey seriously until his teenage years. After the First World War he attended an agricultural college in Manitoba. He originally did not make the school's hockey team; however, after taunting from his older brother, Shore started to take the game seriously once again, improving his skills and making the college team.

== Playing career ==
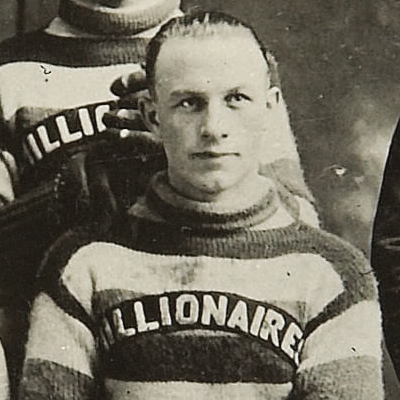
Shore with the Melville Millionaires.

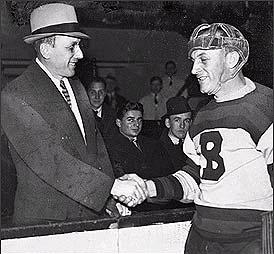
Ace Bailey (left) shakes the hand of Eddie Shore at the benefit All-Star Game held in honour of Bailey.

Shore started his career with his hometown minor hockey team, the Cupar Canucks. He played for the Melville Millionaires and won the 1923–24 Saskatchewan senior championship.

Shore moved up to professional hockey with the Regina Capitals of the Western Canada Hockey League in 1925. His team finished last in the league and moved to Portland after the season. Shore moved to the league champion Edmonton Eskimos in 1926, where he converted from forward to defence and was given the nickname "the Edmonton Express".

When the Western Hockey League (renamed from the WCHL) folded in 1926, Shore was sold to the Boston Bruins of the NHL. As a rookie, he scored 12 goals and 6 assists for a total of 18 points and accumulated 130 penalty minutes. His first goal came on November 20, 1926, in Boston's 5–1 loss to Chicago. When he joined the Bruins, he was paired with fellow defenceman Lionel Hitchman. The two were quickly recognized as the league’s best defensive pairing. They remained partners for the rest of Hitchman’s career, with Shore’s rushing style complementing Hitchman’s stay-at-home play. During Shore’s second year with the team, he and Hitchman helped lead the Bruins to the Stanley Cup Final, though they ultimately lost to the Ottawa Senators. Two years later, the pair anchored a defence that was virtually impenetrable. The Bruins surrendered only 52 goals over 44 games, helping the team capture its first Stanley Cup in 1929. That year he also became one of the highest paid athletes in the country with a $25,000 salary.

Shore was named to the NHL First All-Star Team for the first time in 1931 after recording 31 points with a career-high 15 goals. His best statistical season came in 1932–33, when he scored 8 goals and 35 points, earning him the Hart Memorial Trophy as the NHL’s Most Valuable Player for the first time. That year he also finished 12th in the league's scoring race, which was unheard of for a defenceman at that time.

He became one of the earliest defencemen to use speed and stick-handling skill to carry the puck deep into the offensive zone, doing so with an upright skating style and a defiant air, daring opponents to try to stop him. Bruins trainer Hammy Moore said, "He was the only player I ever saw who had the whole arena standing every time he rushed down the ice. He would either end up bashing somebody, get into a fight, or score a goal."

Shore brought a brand of rough-and-tumble hockey the league had never seen before. He antagonized fans, fought opponents, and stirred more controversy than any other player of his era. He quickly became one of the league’s first star players during the 1920s and 1930s. Also being credited for helping gain the city of Boston's interest in the NHL.

Due to Shore being one of the top players in the league he regularly faced an onslaught of physical punishment. His former teammate Milt Schmidt later commented “He was bruised, head to toe, after every game, everybody was after him. They figured if they could stop Eddie Shore, they could stop the Bruins.”

In the 1925–26 season, Billy Coutu and Sprague Cleghorn of the Montreal Canadiens were traded to the Boston Bruins. During their first practice with the Bruins, Shore strutted back and forth in front of Coutu and Cleghorn. Coutu body-slammed, head-butted, elbowed and tried to torment Shore. Next Coutu picked up the puck and made a rush at Shore. The two players collided. Shore held his ground and Coutu flew through the air violently crashing to the ice. Shore's ear was almost ripped off but he barely noticed it. Coutu was out cold and was out of commission for a week. Shore visited several doctors who wanted to amputate the ear, but found one who sewed it back on. After refusing anesthetic, Shore used a mirror to watch the doctor sew the ear on. Shore claimed Coutu used his hockey stick to cut off the ear, and Coutu was fined $50. Shore later recanted and Coutu's money was refunded.

Shore stood out as one of the NHL’s most frequent fighters. Spending as much time throwing punches as he did handling the puck. In one early-season matchup in 1929 against the Montreal Maroons, he was unusually aggressive, even by his own rough standards, squaring off repeatedly with Buck Boucher and Dave Trottier. Almost everyone on the Maroons were going at Shore throughout the game. In total Shore got into a record five fights throughout the game. By the end of the game Shore had suffered a concussion, a broken nose, two black eyes, and three broken teeth resulting in him spending the night in the hospital.

Another unusual incident involving Shore occurred in January 1930 when he was challenged to a boxing match by baseball player Art Shires. While NHL President Frank Calder said that Shore's participation was up to Bruins' manager Art Ross to decide, baseball commissioner Judge Kenesaw Mountain Landis vetoed Shires' participation, and the match was never held. On January 24, 1933, during a game against Montreal, Shore accidentally punched NHL referee-in-chief Cooper Smeaton during a fight with Sylvio Mantha and was fined $100.

On March 30, 1933, Shore scored a playoff overtime goal against Toronto, the only time he accomplished that feat in his career.

In Boston Garden on December 12, 1933, Shore ended the career of Toronto Maple Leafs star Ace Bailey when he hit Bailey from behind. When Bailey's head hit the ice, he was knocked unconscious and went into convulsions. Moments earlier, Maple Leafs teammate King Clancy upended Shore with a hard check as he rushed up the ice. Angry, dazed, and thinking he was going after Clancy, Shore rushed at Bailey intent on revenge. In retaliation, the Leafs tough-guy Red Horner punched Shore, whose head hit the ice as he fell from the blow. Shore was knocked unconscious and required seven stitches but was not seriously injured. Bailey was rushed to hospital in critical condition with a fractured skull and was operated on for more than four hours. There were many fears that he could possibly die. He came out of a coma for the second time 10 days later, making a full recovery, but he did not play professionally again. When he was assured that Bailey would survive, league president Frank Calder suspended Shore for 16 games. An all-star benefit game was held at Maple Leaf Gardens on February 14, 1934, which raised $20,909 for Bailey and his family. Bailey and Shore shook hands and embraced at centre ice before the game began. Thirteen years later, the NHL introduced an annual all-star game.

Shore was named captain of the Bruins for the 1935–36 season and continued to be one of the league’s top players. As he went on to capture the Hart Memorial Trophy in back-to-back seasons (1935 and 1936). During the 1937 season Shore missed half the year after suffering a cracked vertebra. He then made a full comeback the following year and captured the Hart Memorial trophy for a fourth and final time in 1938.

Shore and the Bruins won their second Stanley Cup in 1939. Shore retired and bought the Springfield Indians of the American Hockey League, where he was player-owner in 1939–40. He was persuaded to rejoin the Bruins after injuries to the Bruins' defence corps, with an agreement that he would play in home games for $200 per match. Shore played just four games for Boston, and was reported as being unenthusiastic about the arrangement. Obtaining permission to play in the Indians' home games, he began to agitate to play in Springfield road games as well, which provoked his trade to the New York Americans on January 25, 1940, for Eddie Wiseman and $5000. He stayed with the Americans through their elimination from the playoffs, and was simultaneously playing with the Indians in their playoff games. Shore's final NHL game was March 24 against the Detroit Red Wings, which coincidentally was also the final NHL game for Hall of Famer and teammate Nels Stewart.

In February 1940, Shore and eight other arena managers organized the Ice Capades.

Throughout his career Shore had a reputation as a fierce competitor which was solidified by his aggressive style of play, which contributed to his nickname as one of the toughest players of his era. Shore's career was marked by significant injuries, yet he continued to play and push the boundaries of defencemen's roles by incorporating offensive strategies. Being viewed as one of the best defenceman in the history of the NHL.

Richard A. Johnson, curator of The Sports Museum in Boston, once remarked: “I always describe Shore as both the Babe Ruth and Ty Cobb of hockey. He had skill and a charisma that made you never want to take your eyes off him, and he also had a competitive ferocity that created this aura of imminent dread and contention that was always present. You always had the sense that something was going to happen when he was on the ice.”

Shore’s midnight ride

One of the most famous tales about Shore took place when he was travelling with a friend to catch the Bruins’ overnight train to Montreal. Along the way, his friend’s car broke down. Instead of leaving him behind and grabbing a cab, Shore rolled up his sleeves and tried to repair the engine himself. By the time they finally made it to the station, the team train had already departed. Refusing to give up, Shore struck a deal with a taxi driver, offering $100 to be driven the 510 km (320 mi) to Montreal. Shore and the cab driver met rough conditions, with heavy snow in the White Mountains. Resulting Shore often had to take the wheel himself, at one point stopping a trucker to borrow tire chains. He shovelled the cab out of ditches multiple times, and when the car could go no farther, he even hopped onto a horse-drawn sleigh to reach another station. The entire ordeal lasted 22 hours, but he managed to arrive just before game time. Coach Art Ross fined Shore $200 for the incident. However with his face raw from windburn and traces of frostbite, Shore went on to play one of the best games of his career scoring the only goal of the game with the Bruins winning 1–0.

== Retirement and the Indians ==
Eddie Shore in Springfield, Massachusetts

Although Shore had played his last NHL game, he played two more seasons in Springfield. The Indians halted operations during World War II, and Shore moved his players to Buffalo where he coached the Buffalo Bisons of the AHL to the Calder Cup championship in 1943 and 1944. Shore hired John Ducey to handle public relations and promote hockey in Springfield and Buffalo. After the war, the Springfield Indians resumed play in 1946 and Shore returned.

In addition to owning the Indians, Shore purchased the Oakland Oaks of the Pacific Coast Hockey League (PCHL) in May 1948, and owned the team until it folded in December 1949.

As an owner, Shore could be cantankerous and was often accused of treating players with little respect. He commonly had Springfield players who had been out of the lineup perform maintenance in the Eastern States Coliseum, the Indians' home, referring to them as "Black Aces". Today, the term is commonly used to refer to extra players on the roster who train with the team in case of injury. Despite this, the Indians prospered under his ownership, making the playoffs 12 times and winning three Calder Cups in a row from 1960 to 1962. During the 1967 season, the entire Indians team refused to play after Shore suspended three players without pay, including future NHL star Bill White, for what he said was "indifferent play". When the team asked for an explanation, Shore suspended the two players who spoke for the team, one of whom was Brian Kilrea. Alan Eagleson, then a little-known lawyer and sometime politician, was brought in to negotiate with Shore on the players' behalf. The battle escalated for months, ending with Shore giving up day-to-day operation of the club to the Los Angeles Kings; the genesis of the National Hockey League Players' Association stems from that incident. Shore took back full control of the team in 1974, changed its name back to the Indians and restored its traditional blue-white-red scheme. He continued to own the team until he sold it in 1976. In total the team won the Calder Cup 5x under Shore’s management in 1960, 1961, 1962, 1971 and 1975.

Shore was also involved in the local community, starting a youth hockey program and the greater Springfield amateur hockey league. While he was owner of the Indians he would open up the home rink on Saturdays, where he would hold skating lessons for the local youth. Shore is widely recognized as “the savior of hockey” in Western Massachusetts. His efforts to revive the Springfield Indians and foster youth programs have left a lasting impression on the region’s sports culture.

Shore and his wife remained in the Springfield area, Shore son Eddie Jr was also involved in the game of hockey and helped him manage the Indians. He also owned a farm in Alberta that he bought during his playing days.

On March 15, 1985, Shore was visiting his son in Springfield, Massachusetts. That night, Shore began coughing up and vomiting blood and was rushed to the hospital. He was pronounced dead the next morning and the cause of death was later determined to be liver cancer. His funeral was held in his hometown five days later. He is buried in Hillcrest Park Cemetery in the Sixteen Acres section of Springfield.

== Cultural references ==
In the film Slap Shot, Eddie Shore's name, along with Toe Blake and Dit Clapper, is considered synonymous with "old-time hockey." Shore is also featured in the Don Cherry biopic Keep Your Head Up Kid: The Don Cherry Story where he was portrayed by Stephen McHattie.

== Honors and recognition ==
Shore was elected to the Hockey Hall of Fame in 1947. The Boston Bruins retired his uniform number, 2. The Eddie Shore Award is given annually to the AHL's best defenceman. The Boston Bruins also give out their own annual Eddie Shore Award, which is given to the player "demonstrating exceptional hustle and determination". In 1970 Shore was awarded the Lester Patrick Trophy for contributions to U.S. Hockey. Also being inducted into the Canada's Sports Hall of Fame in 1975.

In 1998, he was ranked number 10 by the Hockey News on its list of the 100 Greatest Hockey Players, making him the highest-ranked pre-World War II player.

For his contributions to hockey, Eddie Shore was awarded the vanity license plate "MR HOCKEY" by the Commonwealth of Massachusetts.

In 2017 Shore was named one of the 100 Greatest NHL Players of all time.

He was inducted into the Massachusetts Hockey Hall of Fame in 2019.

There is a memorial plaque in West Springfield, Massachusetts, in Shore’s honor. The commemorative plaque honoring Shore is displayed at the Eastern States Exposition Coliseum. It highlights his roles as a player, coach, manager, benefactor, and mentor to youth.

Artifacts and memorabilia from Shore’s early career and local involvement are displayed in his hometown museum in Cupar, Saskatchewan, highlighting recognition of his legacy.

He was honored during the Bruins centennial celebrations in 2024. Being named to the Boston Bruins all-centennial team.

== Awards, achievements and records ==
- Named to the WHL first All-Star team in 1926.
- Stanley Cup champion in 1929 and 1939.
- Named to the NHL first All-Star team in 1931, 1932, 1933, 1935, 1936, 1938, 1939.
- Won the Hart Memorial Trophy as the NHL's Most Valuable Player in 1933, 1935, 1936, 1938.
- Named to the NHL second All-Star team in 1934.
- Played in the NHL All star benefit memorial game in 1934, 1937 and 1939
- His #2 jersey number was retired by the Boston Bruins on January 1, 1947.
- Inducted into the Hockey Hall of Fame in 1947.
- Calder Cup champion (as coach) 1943 and 1944 (as owner) 1960, 1961, 1962, 1971 and 1975
- Won the Lester Patrick Trophy for contributions to hockey in 1970.
- Inducted into Canada's Sports Hall of Fame in 1975.
- Inducted into the Saskatchewan Hockey Hall of Fame.
- In 1998, he was ranked No. 10 on The Hockey News' list of the 100 Greatest Hockey Players.
- Inducted into the American Hockey League Hall of Fame in 2006.
- In January, 2017, Shore was part of the first group of players to be named one of the '100 Greatest NHL Players' in history.
- Inducted into the Massachusetts Hockey Hall of Fame in 2019
- Named One of the Top 100 Best Bruins Players of all Time in 2023.
- Named to the Boston Bruins All-Centennial Team.

=== Records ===
- NHL record for most Hart Memorial Trophies as the NHL's most valuable player by a defenceman: (4)
- Oldest player in NHL history along with Herb Gardiner to win the Hart Memorial Trophy – 35 years old.
- Most fights in one NHL game (5)

== Career statistics ==
=== Regular season and playoffs ===
- **Bold** indicates led league

			Regular season					Playoffs
Season	Team	League	GP	G	A	Pts	PIM	GP	G	A	Pts	PIM
1923–24	Melville Millionaires	S-SSHL	—	—	—	—	—	2	6	2	8	0
1923–24	Melville Millionaires	Al-Cup	—	—	—	—	—	9	8	6	14	0
1924–25	Regina Capitals	WCHL	24	6	0	6	75	—	—	—	—	—
1925–26	Edmonton Eskimos	WHL	30	12	2	14	86	2	0	0	0	8
1926–27	Boston Bruins	NHL	41	12	6	18	**136**	8	1	1	2	**46**
1927–28	Boston Bruins	NHL	43	11	6	17	**165**	2	0	0	0	8
1928–29	Boston Bruins	NHL	39	12	7	19	98	5	1	1	2	**28**
1929–30	Boston Bruins	NHL	42	12	19	31	109	6	1	0	1	**26**
1930–31	Boston Bruins	NHL	44	15	16	31	107	5	2	1	3	22
1931–32	Boston Bruins	NHL	45	9	13	22	98	—	—	—	—	—
1932–33	Boston Bruins	NHL	48	8	27	35	112	5	1	1	2	14
1933–34	Boston Bruins	NHL	30	2	10	12	67	—	—	—	—	—
1934–35	Boston Bruins	NHL	48	7	26	33	32	4	0	1	1	2
1935–36	Boston Bruins	NHL	45	3	16	19	61	2	1	1	2	12
1936–37	Boston Bruins	NHL	20	3	1	4	12	—	—	—	—	—
1937–38	Boston Bruins	NHL	48	3	14	17	42	3	0	1	1	6
1938–39	Boston Bruins	NHL	44	4	14	18	47	12	0	4	4	19
1939–40	Boston Bruins	NHL	4	2	1	3	4	—	—	—	—	—
1939–40	New York Americans	NHL	10	2	3	5	9	3	0	2	2	2
1939–40	Springfield Indians	IAHL	15	1	14	15	18	2	0	1	1	0
1940–41	Springfield Indians	AHL	56	4	13	17	66	3	0	0	0	2
1941–42	Springfield Indians	AHL	35	5	12	17	61	5	0	3	3	6
1943–44	Buffalo Bisons	AHL	1	0	0	0	0	—	—	—	—	—
NHL totals			551	105	179	284	1099	55	7	13	20	185
WCHL/WHL totals			54	18	2	20	161	2	0	0	0	8

Preceded by Babe Siebert	Winner of the Hart Trophy; 1938	Succeeded by Toe Blake
Preceded by Aurèle Joliat	Winner of the Hart Trophy; 1935, 1936	Succeeded by Babe Siebert
Preceded by Howie Morenz	Winner of the Hart Trophy; 1933	Succeeded by Aurèle Joliat
Preceded by Nels Stewart	Boston Bruins captain 1935–36	Succeeded by Red Beattie
