= Busher Jackson =

Canadian ice hockey player (1911–1966)

- Hockey Hall of Fame, 1971
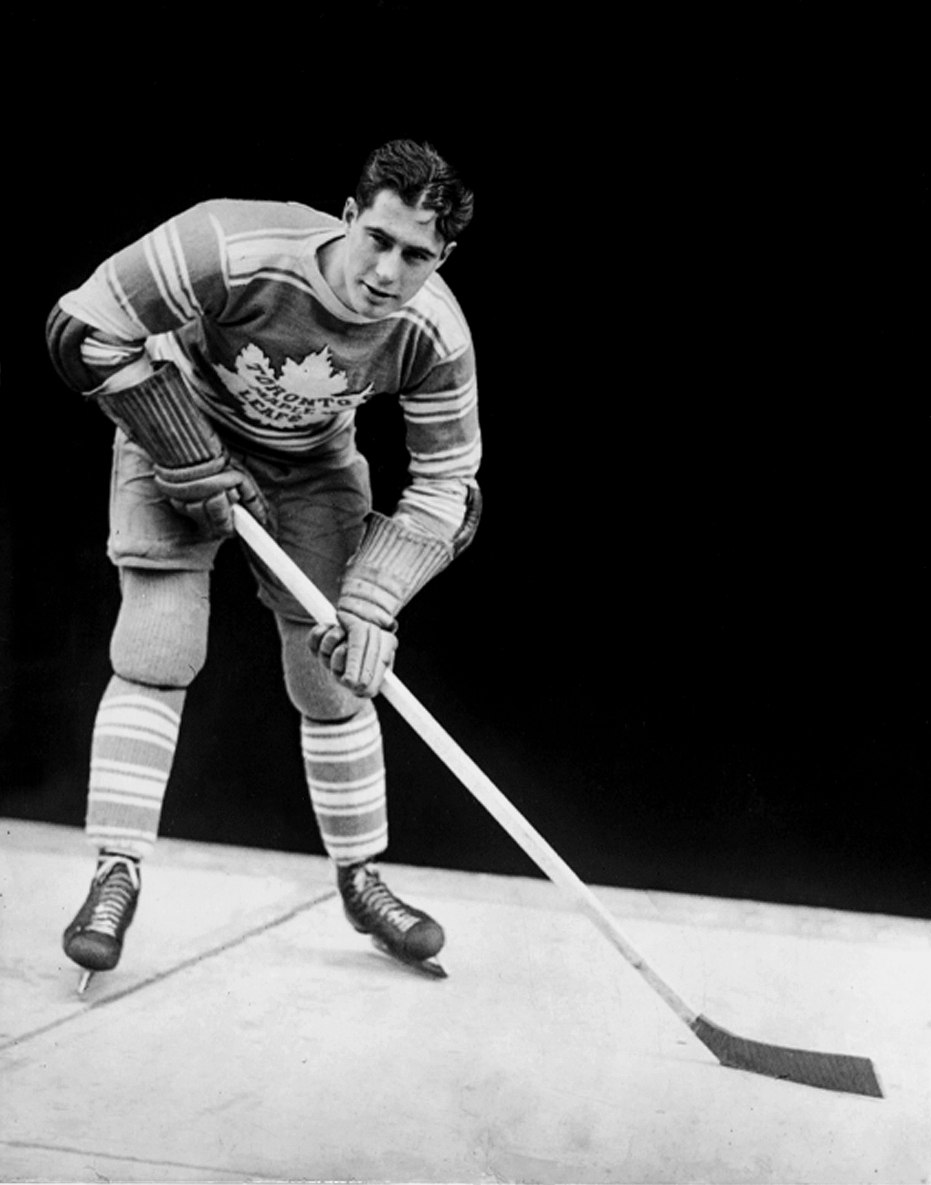
- Jackson, c. 1930s
- Born: January 17, 1911 Toronto, Ontario, Canada
- Died: June 25, 1966 (aged 55) Toronto, Ontario, Canada
- Height: 5 ft 11 in (180 cm)
- Weight: 185 lb (84 kg; 13 st 3 lb)
- Position: Left wing/Defence
- Shot: Left
- Played for: Toronto Maple Leafs; New York Americans; Boston Bruins
- Playing career: 1929–1944

Ralph Harvey "Busher" Jackson (January 17, 1911 – June 25, 1966) was a Canadian professional ice hockey player. Jackson played in the National Hockey League (NHL) from 1929 to 1944 for the Toronto Maple Leafs, New York Americans, and Boston Bruins. He was a member of the Maple Leafs' famed Kid Line with Joe Primeau and Charlie Conacher, one of the early NHL's dominant scoring trios. Jackson led the league in scoring in 1931–32 and was a member of Toronto's 1932 Stanley Cup championship team. He was named to the NHL All-Star team five times and played in three benefit All-Star Games, including the Ace Bailey Benefit Game, the first All-Star contest in NHL history.

Off the ice, Jackson was well-known for his high-spending lifestyle and drinking that prompted his trade from Toronto to New York in 1939. He is remembered as one of hockey's tragic figures, as he struggled with alcoholism and financial difficulty following his retirement. For years his personal difficulties made him ineligible for induction to the Hockey Hall of Fame in the eyes of members of its selection committee. He was finally inducted into the Hall in 1971, five years after his death. Jackson is also an honoured member of Canada's Sports Hall of Fame, into which he was inducted in 1975. He was the brother of fellow NHL player Art Jackson.

== Playing career ==
=== Junior ===
Jackson grew up in Toronto and played hockey in his youth at Poverty Pond in the city's east side. He then played at the Ravina Rink where he was discovered by Frank Selke, the assistant general manager of the Toronto Maple Leafs. Selke signed Jackson to a contract and assigned him to the Toronto Marlboros in the Ontario Hockey Association (OHA)'s junior league for the 1927–28 season. Jackson scored four goals in four regular season games that season. In 1928–29 season, he scored 10 goals and 14 points in nine regular season games, and led the OHA playoffs with seven goals and nine points as the Marlboros won the OHA championship. In the 1929 Memorial Cup playdowns, he scored 15 goals and 25 points in 13 games, and in the finals the Marlboros defeated the Elmwood Millionaires in a best-of-three series to win their first Memorial Cup championship.

=== Toronto Maple Leafs ===
Jackson joined the Maple Leafs for the 1929–30 season; at eighteen he was the youngest player in the National Hockey League (NHL). In his debut against the Montreal Canadiens, Jackson knocked down his idol Howie Morenz with a hard check. Rising from the ice, Morenz told the young man, "You'll do." In 31 games that season, Jackson scored 12 goals and had 6 assists. Jackson got his nickname from the team's trainer, Tim Daly. As Jackson told it, "Daly asked me to carry sticks for him. I told him I wasn't a stick boy, I was a hockey player, so he said I was nothing but a fresh busher [i.e. one who had just been called up from the minors] and the name stuck."

Also during his first season, Jackson was placed on a line with two other young players: right winger Charlie Conacher, his former teammate on the Marlboros, and centre Joe Primeau. The trio became known as "the Kid Line," one of the early NHL's most famous scoring trios. Primeau was the line's playmaker, setting up key goal-scorers Conacher and Jackson.

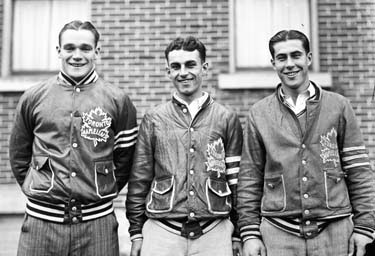
The Kid Line of Conacher, Primeau and Jackson

In 1930–31 Jackson scored 31 point, and in 1931–32 he led the NHL in scoring with 53 points. At 21 years, 3 months old, he became the youngest scoring champion in NHL history, a record he held until 1980–81, when it was broken by Wayne Gretzky. Jackson's 28 goals that season was the highest of his career, and he was named to the NHL's First All-Star team for the first time. He scored five goals in the 1932 playoffs, including one of Toronto's six in the deciding game of the 1932 Stanley Cup Final, a 6–4 victory over the New York Rangers that clinched Toronto's first Stanley Cup championship since 1922.

The Kid Line were the team's top three scorers between 1932 and 1935. Following his league-leading season, Jackson led Toronto offensively in 1932–33 with 44 points. On November 20, 1934, Jackson scored four goals in a period, the first NHL player to do so, in the third period of a 5–2 victory over the St. Louis Eagles. As of 2019 the record has been matched eleven times, but never surpassed. He was named to the All-Star Team three more times during this period, placed on the second team in 1932–33 and on the first team in both 1933–34 and 1934–35. He also played in the Ace Bailey Benefit Game on February 14, 1934, the first all-star game in NHL history. Jackson scored two goals for the Maple Leafs in a 7–3 victory over the NHL All-Stars.

Following four consecutive 20-goal seasons, Jackson slipped to 11 goals in 1935–36. The Kid Line was finally broken up. While Jackson, Conacher and Primeau remained consistent offensive performers, they lacked defensive ability and opposing teams found success with their own top scoring lines against the trio. Primeau retired in 1936, but Jackson rebounded in 1936–37 with 21 goals and 40 points, and appeared on the first All-Star team for the fourth and last time.

In 1937 Jackson played with the NHL All-Stars in the Howie Morenz Memorial Game, the NHL's second benefit all-star contest. His production declined as he had 34 points in 1936–37, then 27 in 1938–39. On May 18, 1939, the Maple Leafs traded him to the New York Americans along with Jimmy Fowler, Murray Armstrong, Doc Romnes and Buzz Boll in exchange for Sweeney Schriner. The five-for-one deal was unprecedented in NHL history at that time.

=== New York and Boston ===
At the beginning of his first season in New York, Jackson played in his third benefit all-star game, the Babe Siebert Memorial Game, on October 29, 1939. He played for the NHL All-Stars in a 5–2 victory over the Montreal Canadiens. That season he posted 12 goals and had 20 points for the Americans, then improved to 26 points in 1940–41. He was unable to come to terms with team manager Red Dutton on a new contract for the 1941–42 season, and did not join the team at the start of the season. The impasse lasted until January 4, 1942 when Dutton sold Jackson's rights to the Boston Bruins for $7,500.

In Boston, Jackson played alongside his younger brother Art. Joining the Bruins late in the season, he played only 26 games and scored only 12 points. The Bruins sometimes placed him on defence when they lost players to injury or the Second World War. He had 34 points in 1942–43, and his 19 goals were his highest total in six seasons. The Bruins reached the 1943 Stanley Cup Final but lost to the Detroit Red Wings in four straight games. Jackson retired after the 1943–44 season, after a 15-year career.

== Personal life ==
Considered by some to have the looks of a movie star, Jackson lived the lifestyle of a Hollywood actor during his playing career, spending money freely, driving fast cars, and attending posh parties. Maple Leafs' owner Conn Smythe tried in vain to convince Jackson to save his money for the future, and even offered to match his player's savings dollar for dollar. Jackson's habits, particularly his drinking, ultimately compelled the Leafs to trade him. Jackson's lifestyle came crashing down following his retirement as a player, as he no longer had the money to live lavishly. He tried without success to overcome his alcoholism, had two marriages end in divorce and struggled to hold a job. It was said that he could be found outside Maple Leaf Gardens trying to sell broken sticks of Maple Leaf players to make some money.

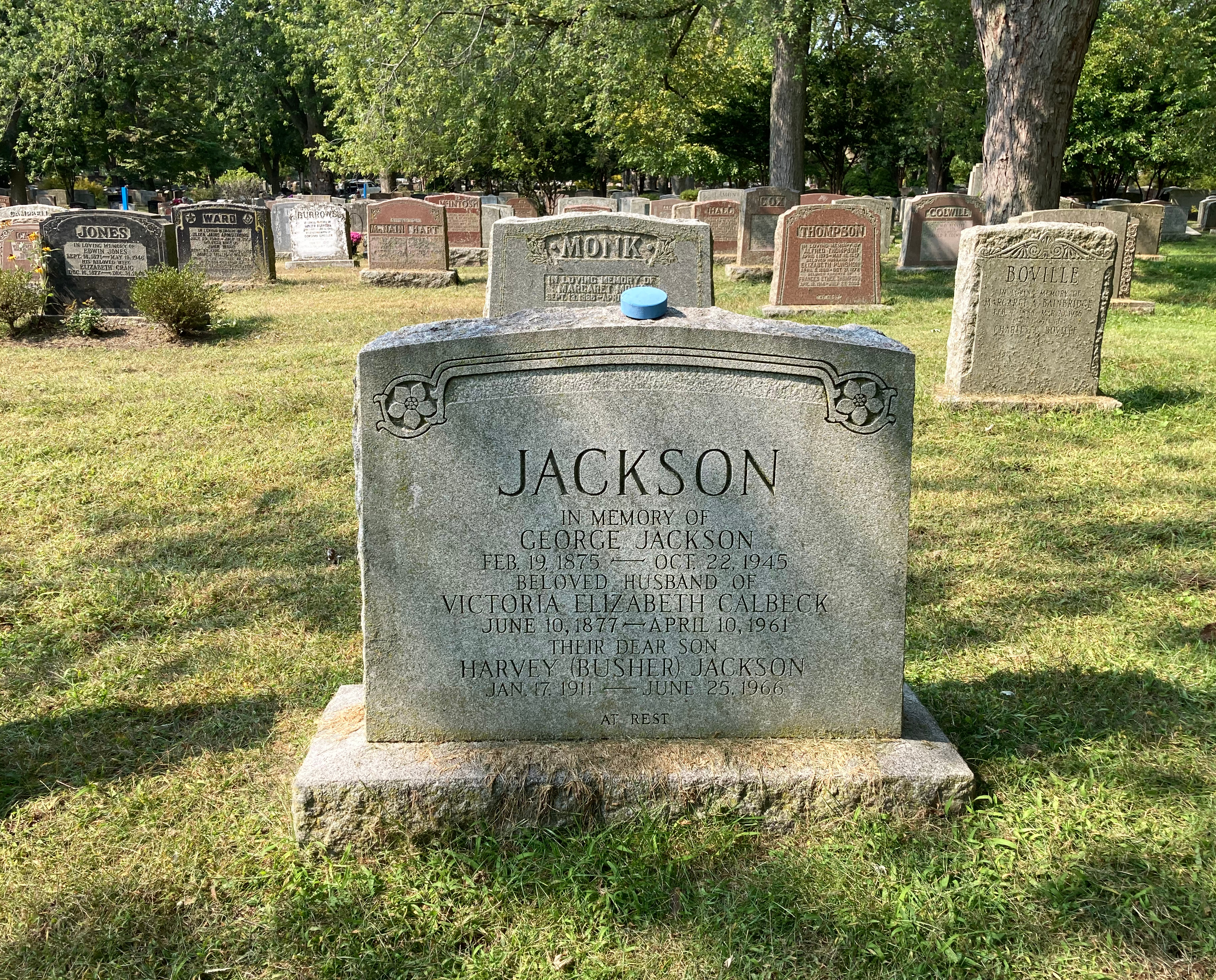
Jackson's grave at Park Lawn Cemetery

Jackson suffered a series of injuries and ailments in his later years. In 1958, he broke his neck after falling down a flight of stairs. His recovery took 18 months and the accident cost him mobility in his right hand. Two months after his release, Jackson returned to hospital with a bout of jaundice. He was hospitalized again in 1962 following an epileptic seizure.

As Jackson's health failed, the prospect of his induction to the Hockey Hall of Fame became a matter of controversy. Though he was considered one of hockey's greatest left wingers and was famed for his attacking style of play and backhand shot, Jackson's personal problems led Smythe, who was also the Hall's chairman, to blacklist him. Though Primeau and Conacher had been inducted, Jackson died on June 25, 1966, without being given the same honour. He was buried at Park Lawn Cemetery in Toronto. It would be another five years until the rest of the selection committee overruled Smythe and inducted Jackson into the Hall of Fame in 1971. Smythe quit the committee in protest, while Jackson's son Kim accepted the honour on his father's behalf. In 1975, Jackson was inducted into Canada's Sports Hall of Fame, and The Hockey News ranked him 55th in its 1997 book, The Top 100 NHL players of All-Time.

== Career statistics ==
			Regular season					Playoffs
Season	Team	League	GP	G	A	Pts	PIM	GP	G	A	Pts	PIM
1927–28	Toronto Marlboros	OHA-Jr.	4	4	0	4	2	2	0	0	0	0
1928–29	Toronto Marlboros	OHA-Jr.	9	10	4	14	0	3	7	2	9	—
1928–29	Toronto Marlboros	Mem. Cup	—	—	—	—	—	13	15	10	25	4
1929–30	Toronto Maple Leafs	NHL	32	12	6	18	29	—	—	—	—	—
1930–31	Toronto Maple Leafs	NHL	43	18	13	31	81	2	0	0	0	2
1931–32	Toronto Maple Leafs	NHL	48	28	25	53	63	7	5	2	7	13
1932–33	Toronto Maple Leafs	NHL	48	27	17	44	43	9	3	1	4	2
1933–34	Toronto Maple Leafs	NHL	38	20	18	38	38	5	1	0	1	8
1934–35	Toronto Maple Leafs	NHL	42	22	22	44	27	7	3	2	5	2
1935–36	Toronto Maple Leafs	NHL	47	11	11	22	19	9	3	2	5	2
1936–37	Toronto Maple Leafs	NHL	46	21	19	40	12	2	1	0	1	2
1937–38	Toronto Maple Leafs	NHL	48	17	17	34	18	6	1	0	1	8
1938–39	Toronto Maple Leafs	NHL	42	10	17	27	12	7	0	1	1	2
1939–40	New York Americans	NHL	43	12	8	20	10	3	0	1	1	2
1940–41	New York Americans	NHL	46	8	18	26	4	—	—	—	—	—
1941–42	Boston Bruins	NHL	27	5	7	12	8	5	0	1	1	0
1942–43	Boston Bruins	NHL	44	19	15	34	38	9	1	2	3	10
1943–44	Boston Bruins	NHL	42	11	21	32	25	—	—	—	—	—
NHL totals			636	241	234	475	437	71	18	12	30	55

Preceded by Howie Morenz	NHL Scoring Champion; 1932	Succeeded by Bill Cook
