= Baldy Northcott =

Canadian ice hockey player

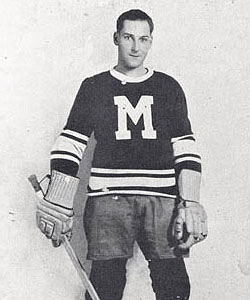
- Northcott with the Montreal Maroons, c. 1930s
- Born: September 7, 1908 Calgary, Alberta, Canada
- Died: November 7, 1986 (aged 78) Winnipeg, Manitoba, Canada
- Height: 6 ft 0 in (183 cm)
- Weight: 184 lb (83 kg; 13 st 2 lb)
- Position: Defence/Left wing
- Shot: Left
- Played for: Montreal Maroons; Chicago Black Hawks
- Playing career: 1928–1939

Lawrence McFarlane "Baldy" Northcott (September 7, 1908 – November 7, 1986) was a Canadian professional ice hockey left winger. Born in Calgary, Alberta, Northcott played ten seasons in the National Hockey League for the Montreal Maroons and Chicago Black Hawks.

== Playing career ==
=== Montreal Maroons ===
Northcott achieved all-star status in 1932–33 playing on a line with Jimmy Ward and Hooley Smith. In the 1934–35 Stanley Cup playoffs he scored the winning goal in two games, helping the Maroons win the Stanley Cup.

=== Chicago Blackhawks ===
After the Maroons folded, Northcott was traded to the Chicago Blackhawks where he would play his last game in the National Hockey league, retiring at the end of the 1938–39 season.

== Coaching career ==
Northcott coached the Winnipeg Rangers of the Manitoba Junior Hockey League for one season in 1940–41, leading them to the Memorial Cup Championship.

== Retirement ==
In his retirement Northcott operated an eponymously named sporting goods store in Winnipeg.

== Awards and achievements ==
=== Player ===
- 1932–33 - NHL First Team All-Star - Left Wing
- 1934–35 - Stanley Cup Champion - Montreal Maroons
- 1937–38 - Played in Howie Morenz Memorial Game
- Honoured Member - Manitoba Hockey Hall of Fame

=== Coach ===
- 1940–41 - Memorial Cup Champion - Winnipeg Rangers

== Career statistics ==
=== Regular season and playoffs ===
			Regular season					Playoffs
Season	Team	League	GP	G	A	Pts	PIM	GP	G	A	Pts	PIM
1926–27	Brantford Redmen	OHA-Jr.	—	—	—	—	—	—	—	—	—	—
1927–28	Haileybury YMCA	NOHA	—	—	—	—	—	—	—	—	—	—
1928–29	North Bay Trappers	NOHA	—	—	—	—	—	—	—	—	—	—
1928–29	Montreal Maroons	NHL	5	0	0	0	0	—	—	—	—	—
1929–30	Montreal Maroons	NHL	43	10	1	11	6	4	0	0	0	4
1930–31	Montreal Maroons	NHL	22	7	3	10	15	2	0	1	1	0
1930–31	Windsor Bulldogs	IHL	21	12	6	18	18	—	—	—	—	—
1931–32	Montreal Maroons	NHL	48	19	6	25	33	4	1	2	3	4
1932–33	Montreal Maroons	NHL	48	22	21	43	30	2	0	0	0	4
1933–34	Montreal Maroons	NHL	47	20	13	33	27	4	2	0	2	0
1934–35	Montreal Maroons	NHL	47	9	14	23	44	7	4	1	5	0
1935–36	Montreal Maroons	NHL	48	15	21	36	41	3	0	0	0	0
1936–37	Montreal Maroons	NHL	46	15	14	29	18	5	1	1	2	2
1937–38	Montreal Maroons	NHL	46	11	12	23	50	—	—	—	—	—
1938–39	Chicago Black Hawks	NHL	46	5	7	12	9	—	—	—	—	—
NHL totals			446	133	112	245	273	31	8	5	13	14

== Transactions ==
- Traded by the Montreal Maroons with Earl Robinson and Russ Blinco to the Chicago Blackhawks for $30,000, September 15, 1938.
