= Calgary Bronks (ice hockey) =

Canadian ice hockey team

The Calgary Bronks were a senior ice hockey team from Calgary, Alberta. They were organized in 1928 in the Southern Alberta Senior League. It moved to the Alberta Senior League in the merger of 1936.

The Bronks won the Southern League title in 1929–30, 1931–32, and 1932–33. They won the Alberta title in 1931–32 but lost the Western Canada final.

They merged with the Calgary Rangers in 1938 to form the Calgary Stampeders hockey team.

== Season-by-season records ==
=== Southern Alberta Senior Hockey League ===
Season	Games	Won	Lost	Tied	Points	GoalsFor	GoalsAgainst	Standing	Playoffs	
1928–29	18	9	7	2	20	42	41	1st	Lost Final	
1929–30	16	9	6	1	19	34	28	1st	Won Final Lost Provincial Semi Final	
1930–31	16	6	7	3	15	28	29	4th	Lost Semi Final	
1931–32	20	17	2	1	35	-	-	1st	Won Final Lost West Final	
1932–33	8	6	1	1	13	28	16	1st	Won Final Lost Provincial Final	
1933–34	16	5	10	1	11	54	69	3rd	out of playoffs	
1934–35	18	9	6	3	21	79	58	2nd	Lost Semi Final	
1935–36	22	9	12	1	19	96	99	2nd	Lost Final

=== Alberta Senior Hockey League ===
Season	Games	Won	Lost	Tied	Points	GoalsFor	GoalsAgainst	Standing	Playoffs	
1936–37	26	15	10	1	31	123	88	2nd	Lost Semi Final	
1937–38	26	4	22	0	8	85	158	6th	out of playoffs
