= Jimmy Ward (ice hockey) =

Canadian ice hockey player

- Born: September 1, 1906 Fort William, Ontario, Canada
- Died: November 15, 1990 (aged 84) Portland, Oregon, USA
- Height: 5 ft 11 in (180 cm)
- Weight: 182 lb (83 kg; 13 st 0 lb)
- Position: Right wing
- Shot: Right
- Played for: Montreal Maroons; Montreal Canadiens
- Playing career: 1927–1939

James William Ward (September 1, 1906 - November 15, 1990) was a Canadian ice hockey right winger who played in the National Hockey League (NHL) from 1928 to 1939 with the Montreal Maroons and Montreal Canadiens. Ward's son, Pete Ward, played nine seasons of professional baseball, winning the Sporting News Rookie of the Year Award honors in 1963 while playing for the Chicago White Sox.

== Playing career ==
Born in Fort William, Ontario, he played his entire National Hockey League career in Montreal. It began in the 1928 season with the Montreal Maroons. He would stay with the Montreal team until they folded following the 1938 season. Along the way he scored 10 or more goals in 10 of 11 seasons during a time when the regular season was only 48 games long. He won the Stanley Cup in 1935. He played in the Ace Bailey Benefit Game in 1934 and the Howie Morenz Memorial Game in 1937. When the Maroons folded he joined the rival Montreal Canadiens for the 1938–39 season.

== Coaching career ==
In 1940 he served as a player/coach of the New Haven Eagles of the IAHL. He would later serve as head coach of the Pacific Coast Hockey League's Portland Eagles and Portland Penguins.

Ward remained in Portland, Oregon after his retirement and died in 1990.

== Career statistics ==
=== Regular season and playoffs ===
			Regular season					Playoffs
Season	Team	League	GP	G	A	Pts	PIM	GP	G	A	Pts	PIM
1925–26	Kenora Thistles	TBSHL	16	10	3	13	16	—	—	—	—	—
1926–27	Fort William Forts	TBSHL	20	18	5	23	20	2	0	0	0	0
1927–28	Montreal Maroons	NHL	42	10	2	12	44	9	1	1	2	6
1928–29	Montreal Maroons	NHL	43	14	8	22	46	—	—	—	—	—
1929–30	Montreal Maroons	NHL	44	10	7	17	54	4	0	1	1	12
1930–31	Montreal Maroons	NHL	41	14	8	22	52	2	0	0	0	2
1931–32	Montreal Maroons	NHL	48	19	19	38	39	4	2	1	3	0
1932–33	Montreal Maroons	NHL	48	16	17	33	52	2	0	0	0	0
1933–34	Montreal Maroons	NHL	48	14	9	23	46	0	0	0	0
1934–35	Montreal Maroons	NHL	41	9	6	15	24	7	1	1	2	0
1935–36	Montreal Maroons	NHL	48	12	19	31	30	3	0	0	0	6
1936–37	Montreal Maroons	NHL	40	14	14	28	34	—	—	—	—	—
1937–38	Montreal Maroons	NHL	48	11	15	26	34	—	—	—	—	—
1938–39	Montreal Canadiens	NHL	36	4	3	7	0	1	0	0	0	0
1939–40	New Haven Eagles	IAHL	49	5	14	19	28	—	—	—	—	—
NHL totals			527	147	127	274	455	36	4	4	8	26

== Awards and achievements ==
- Played in Ace Bailey Benefit Game
- Played in Howie Morenz Memorial Game
