= 1936–37 NHL season =

Professional ice hockey league season

- League: National Hockey League
- Sport: Ice hockey
- Duration: November 5, 1936 – April 15, 1937
- Games: 48
- Teams: 8

Regular season
- Season champions: Detroit Red Wings
- Season MVP: Babe Siebert (Canadiens)
- Top scorer: Sweeney Schriner (Americans)
- Canadian Division champions: Montreal Canadiens
- American Division champions: Detroit Red Wings

Stanley Cup
- Champions: Detroit Red Wings
- Runners-up: New York Rangers

NHL seasons
- ← 1935–36 1937–38 →

The 1936–37 NHL season was the 20th season of the National Hockey League (NHL). Eight teams each played 48 games. The Detroit Red Wings were the Stanley Cup winners as they beat the New York Rangers three games to two in the final series.

== League business ==
Frank Calder had been naming the top rookies commencing with 1932–33. This year, he commenced buying a trophy for the top rookie and Syl Apps was this year's winner.

The Great Depression continued to take its toll on the NHL. At the beginning of the decade there were ten teams and in the years since two teams had folded. It appeared like the New York Americans were to become the third team but the NHL took steps to prevent that from happening. Instead of letting the team cease operating because of money and ownership problems the league assumed control of the team for the 1936–37 season. It was then that team owner Bill Dwyer sued. A settlement then allowed for Dwyer to own the team, run by the NHL, and that Dwyer would be given a chance to pay back his debts.

The Montreal Maroons, short of money, had to sell their star and team captain Hooley Smith to Boston. It was hoped that Carl Voss of the former Eagles would fill in adequately for him, but he came down with influenza and was not much help. However, Bob Gracie started scoring and the Maroons almost nipped the Canadiens for first place in the Canadian Division.

== Regular season ==
=== Highlights ===
The New York Americans had started in first place, but then their players came down with influenza and the team went downhill. But the worst blow was when Roy Worters suffered a hernia and had to retire. Alfie Moore and Lorne Chabot were not adequate replacements and the Amerks finished last in the Canadian Division.

On November 16, 1936, Hal Winkler made his NHL debut for the New York Rangers and gained a 1–0 shutout over the Montreal Maroons. He was the first goaltender to have a shutout in his NHL debut. The Montreal Canadiens had hit the bottom in 1935–36, and Babe Siebert was obtained to shore up the defence. But the most loved of all movements was buying Howie Morenz back from the Rangers. The Canadiens went from last to first in the Canadian Division. Morenz was just hitting his stride in January 1937, when tragedy struck. On one of his hurtling rushes, he was being checked by Earl Seibert of Chicago when his left skate got caught in the dasher of the end boards, and Morenz suffered a badly fractured leg. After suffering a nervous breakdown worrying about if he would be able to come back, more bad luck occurred. On March 8, 1937, X-rays revealed that Howie had blood clots in his healing leg. An operation was scheduled for the next day, but when Howie ate a light supper and told the nurse he wanted to rest, in falling asleep his pallor suddenly changed and the nurse knew something was wrong. A blood clot had stopped his heart, and attempts to revive Howie failed. News of Morenz's death shocked the hockey world, and thousands filed past his bier, many in tears, to pay their last respects.

Beyond Morenz's tragic mishap, it was an injury-filled year for many stars. Already suffering from a bad back, Boston's Eddie Shore suffered a broken vertebra that cost him the remainder of the season. Charlie Conacher of the Maple Leafs repeatedly injured his wrist, costing him much of the season, and was never the same player thereafter. A series of minor injuries precipitated Lionel Conacher's decision to retire at year's end, while Sylvio Mantha and Roy Worters suffered career-ending injuries. Other stars who missed several weeks of time or had season-ending injuries included Red Wings captain Doug Young, Larry Aurie, Russ Blinco, Buzz Boll, Pit Lepine, Dave Trottier, Toe Blake and Art Chapman.

With five games left to play, Chicago owner Frederic McLaughlin, a partisan of American-born players, decided to field an all-American lineup, the first time in major senior hockey that this was done. With incumbent Mike Karakas in goal, the Black Hawks signed Ernest Klingbeil and Paul Schaefer on defence, with a line of Milt Brink centering Al Suomi and Bun Laprairie. The team went 1–3 with the sextet in the lineup.

Detroit, led by Vezina Trophy winning Normie Smith, finished first in the American Division.

=== Final standings ===
American Division
	GP	W	L	T	GF	GA	PTS
**Detroit Red Wings**	48	25	14	9	128	102	59
**Boston Bruins**	48	23	18	7	120	110	53
**New York Rangers**	48	19	20	9	117	106	47
Chicago Black Hawks	48	14	27	7	99	131	35

Canadian Division
	GP	W	L	T	GF	GA	PTS
**Montreal Canadiens**	48	24	18	6	115	111	54
**Montreal Maroons**	48	22	17	9	126	110	53
**Toronto Maple Leafs**	48	22	21	5	119	115	49
New York Americans	48	15	29	4	122	161	34

Note: W = Wins, L = Losses, T = Ties, GF = Goals For, GA = Goals Against, Pts = Points
Teams that qualified for the playoffs are highlighted in bold.

== Playoffs ==
=== Playoff bracket ===
The playoffs were modified, replacing all two-game total-goals series with best-of-three series in the "lower repechage" portion of the bracket. The top three teams in each division qualified for the playoffs. The two division winners met in a best-of-five Stanley Cup semifinal series. The divisional second-place teams and third-place teams played off in a best-of-three series to determine the participants for the other best-of-three semifinal series. The semifinal winners then played in a best-of-five Stanley Cup Finals (scores in the bracket indicate the number of games won in each series).

First round
C2	Mtl Maroons	2
A2	Boston	1
C3	Toronto	0
A3	NY Rangers	2

Semifinals
C1	Mtl Canadiens	2
A1	Detroit	3
C2	Mtl Maroons	0
A3	NY Rangers	2

Final
A1	Detroit	3
A3	NY Rangers	2

=== Quarterfinals ===
==== (A2) Boston Bruins vs. (C2) Montreal Maroons ====
March 23	Boston Bruins	1–4	Montreal Maroons	Montreal Forum	Recap
No scoring		First period	13:56 – Carl Voss (1)
No scoring		Second period	12:15 – pp – Baldy Northcott (1)
Ray Getliffe (1) – pp – 06:34		Third period	16:43 – Herb Cain (1); 17:32 – Bob Gracie (1)
Tiny Thompson		Goalie stats	Bill Beveridge

March 25	Montreal Maroons	0–4	Boston Bruins	Boston Garden	Recap
No scoring		First period	04:54 – Dit Clapper (1); 15:42 – Charlie Sands (1)
No scoring		Second period	16:19 – Ray Getliffe (2)
No scoring		Third period	13:50 – Red Beattie (1)
Bill Beveridge		Goalie stats	Tiny Thompson

March 28	Montreal Maroons	4–1	Boston Bruins	Boston Garden	Recap
No scoring		First period	No scoring
Cy Wentworth (1) – 15:49; Russ Blinco (1) – 19:25		Second period	05:18 – Dit Clapper (2)
Earl Robinson (1) – 14:30; Dave Trottier (1) – 17:58		Third period	No scoring
Bill Beveridge		Goalie stats	Tiny Thompson

Montreal won series 2–1

==== (C3) Toronto Maple Leafs vs. (A3) New York Rangers ====
March 23	New York Rangers	3–0	Toronto Maple Leafs	Maple Leaf Gardens	Recap
No scoring		First period	No scoring
Lynn Patrick (1) – pp – 05:29		Second period	No scoring
Murray Murdoch (1) – 15:07; Alex Shibicky (1) – 16:10		Third period	No scoring
Dave Kerr		Goalie stats	Turk Broda

March 25	Toronto Maple Leafs	1–2	OT	New York Rangers	Madison Square Garden III	Recap
Busher Jackson (1) – 01:42		First period		No scoring
No scoring		Second period		No scoring
No scoring		Third period		10:05 – Butch Keeling (1)
No scoring		First overtime period		13:05 – Babe Pratt (1)
Turk Broda		Goalie stats		Dave Kerr

New York won series 2–0

=== Semifinals ===
==== (A1) Detroit Red Wings vs. (C1) Montreal Canadiens ====
March 23	Montreal Canadiens	0–4	Detroit Red Wings	Olympia Stadium	Recap
No scoring		First period	05:21 – Ebbie Goodfellow (1)
No scoring		Second period	16:54 – Herbie Lewis (1)
No scoring		Third period	01:20 – Hec Kilrea (1); 17:52 – Hec Kilrea (2)
Wilf Cude		Goalie stats	Normie Smith

March 25	Montreal Canadiens	1–5	Detroit Red Wings	Olympia Stadium	Recap
Paul Haynes (1) – 09:29		First period	15:42 – Mud Bruneteau (1)
No scoring		Second period	02:07 – Herbie Lewis (2); 04:45 – Herbie Lewis (3); 15:40 – Pete Kelly (1)
No scoring		Third period	17:15 – Pete Kelly (2)
Wilf Cude		Goalie stats	Normie Smith

March 27	Detroit Red Wings	1–3	Montreal Canadiens	Montreal Forum	Recap
No scoring		First period	03:10 – Johnny Gagnon (1)
No scoring		Second period	No scoring
Marty Barry (1) – 01:45		Third period	10:29 – Babe Siebert (1); 17:27 – Johnny Gagnon (2)
Normie Smith		Goalie stats	Wilf Cude

March 30	Detroit Red Wings	1–3	Montreal Canadiens	Montreal Forum	Recap
Syd Howe (1) – 17:00		First period	07:30 – Toe Blake (1); 12:27 – Paul Haynes (2)
No scoring		Second period	18:28 – Joffre Desilets (1)
No scoring		Third period	No scoring
Normie Smith		Goalie stats	Wilf Cude

April 1	Detroit Red Wings	2–1	OT	Montreal Canadiens	Montreal Forum	Recap
No scoring		First period		No scoring
Ebbie Goodfellow (2) – sh – 04:41		Second period		No scoring
No scoring		Third period		14:56 – Bill MacKenzie (1)
Hec Kilrea (3) – 11:49		First overtime period		No scoring
Normie Smith		Goalie stats		Wilf Cude

Detroit won series 3–2

==== (C2) Montreal Maroons vs. (A3) New York Rangers ====
April 1	Montreal Maroons	0–1	New York Rangers	Madison Square Garden III	Recap
No scoring		First period	16:46 – Babe Pratt (1)
No scoring		Second period	No scoring
No scoring		Third period	No scoring
Bill Beveridge		Goalie stats	Dave Kerr

April 3	Montreal Maroons	0–4	New York Rangers	Madison Square Garden III	Recap
No scoring		First period	No scoring
No scoring		Second period	Neil Colville (1) – 04:24; Neil Coville (2) – 06:45; Frank Boucher (1) – 09:10
No scoring		Third period	Mac Colville (1) – 02:41
Bill Beveridge		Goalie stats	Dave Kerr

New York won series 2–0

=== Stanley Cup Finals ===
April 6	Detroit Red Wings	1–5	New York Rangers	Madison Square Garden III	Recap
No scoring		First period	05:23 – Butch Keeling (2); 09:40 – Lynn Patrick (2); 18:43 – Joe Cooper (1)
No scoring		Second period	18:55 – Frank Boucher (2)
Syd Howe (2) – 17:12		Third period	18:22 – Lynn Patrick (3)
Norm Smith		Goalie stats	Dave Kerr

April 8	New York Rangers	2–4	Detroit Red Wings	Olympia Stadium	Recap
No scoring		First period	09:22 – pp – John Sorrell (1); 12:07 – Mud Bruneteau (2); 13:31 – John Gallagher (1)
Babe Pratt (3) – 15:06; Butch Keeling (3) – 18:18		Second period	11:02 – Herbie Lewis (4)
No scoring		Third period	No scoring
Dave Kerr		Goalie stats	Norm Smith

April 11	New York Rangers	1–0	Detroit Red Wings	Olympia Stadium	Recap
No scoring		First period	No scoring
Neil Colville (3) – 00:23		Second period	No scoring
No scoring		Third period	No scoring
Dave Kerr		Goalie stats	Norm Smith

April 13	New York Rangers	0–1	Detroit Red Wings	Olympia Stadium	Recap
No scoring		First period	No scoring
No scoring		Second period	No scoring
No scoring		Third period	12:43 – Marty Barry (2)
Dave Kerr		Goalie stats	Norm Smith

April 15	New York Rangers	0–3	Detroit Red Wings	Olympia Stadium	Recap
No scoring		First period	19:22 – pp – Marty Barry (3)
No scoring		Second period	09:36 – John Sorrell (2)
No scoring		Third period	02:22 – Marty Barry (4)
Dave Kerr		Goalie stats	Norm Smith

Detroit won series 3–2

== Awards ==
The "Rookie of the Year" award now had a trophy, the Calder Trophy, for the first time.

Calder Trophy: (Best first-year player)	Syl Apps, Toronto Maple Leafs
Hart Trophy: (Most valuable player)	Babe Siebert, Montreal Canadiens
Lady Byng Trophy: (Excellence and sportsmanship)	Marty Barry, Detroit Red Wings
O'Brien Cup: (Canadian Division champion)	Montreal Canadiens
Prince of Wales Trophy: (American Division champion)	Detroit Red Wings
Vezina Trophy: (Fewest goals allowed)	Normie Smith, Detroit Red Wings

=== All-Star teams ===
First Team	Position	Second Team
Normie Smith, Detroit Red Wings	G	Wilf Cude, Montreal Canadiens
Babe Siebert, Montreal Canadiens	D	Earl Seibert, Chicago Black Hawks
Ebbie Goodfellow, Detroit Red Wings	D	Lionel Conacher, Montreal Maroons
Marty Barry, Detroit Red Wings	C	Art Chapman, New York Americans
Larry Aurie, Detroit Red Wings	RW	Cecil Dillon, New York Rangers
Busher Jackson, Toronto Maple Leafs	LW	Sweeney Schriner, New York Americans
Jack Adams, Detroit Red Wings	Coach	Cecil Hart, Montreal Canadiens

== Player statistics ==
=== Scoring leaders ===
Note: GP = Games played, G = Goals, A = Assists, PTS = Points, PIM = Penalties in minutes

PLAYER	TEAM	GP	G	A	PTS	PIM
Sweeney Schriner	New York Americans	48	21	25	46	17
Syl Apps	Toronto Maple Leafs	48	16	29	45	10
Marty Barry	Detroit Red Wings	48	17	27	44	6
Larry Aurie	Detroit Red Wings	45	23	19	42	20
Busher Jackson	Toronto Maple Leafs	46	21	19	40	12
Johnny Gagnon	Montreal Canadiens	48	20	16	36	38
Bob Gracie	Montreal Maroons	48	11	25	36	18
Nels Stewart	Boston Bruins/New York Americans	43	23	12	35	37
Paul Thompson	Chicago Black Hawks	47	17	18	35	28
Lorne Carr	New York Americans	48	18	16	34	22
Earl Robinson	Montreal Maroons	48	16	18	34	19
Bill Cowley	Boston Bruins	46	13	21	34	4

Source: NHL

== Coaches ==
=== American Division ===
- Boston Bruins: Art Ross
- Chicago Black Hawks: Clem Loughlin
- Detroit Red Wings: Jack Adams
- New York Rangers: Lester Patrick

=== Canadian Division ===
- Montreal Canadiens: Cecil Hart
- Montreal Maroons: Tommy Gorman
- New York Americans: Red Dutton
- Toronto Maple Leafs: Dick Irvin

== Debuts ==
The following is a list of players of note who played their first NHL game in 1936–37 (listed with their first team, asterisk(*) marks debut in playoffs):

- Bobby Bauer, Boston Bruins
- Milt Schmidt, Boston Bruins
- Clint Smith, New York Rangers
- Bryan Hextall, New York Rangers
- Syl Apps, Toronto Maple Leafs
- Gordie Drillon, Toronto Maple Leafs
- Turk Broda, Toronto Maple Leafs

== Last games ==
The following is a list of players of note that played their last game in the NHL in 1936–37 (listed with their last team):

- Bun Cook, Boston Bruins
- Sylvio Mantha, Boston Bruins
- Andy Blair, Chicago Black Hawks
- Wildor Larochelle, Chicago Black Hawks
- Howie Morenz, Montreal Canadiens
- George Hainsworth, Montreal Canadiens
- Lionel Conacher, Montreal Maroons
- Alex Connell, Montreal Maroons
- Baldy Cotton, New York Americans
- Harry Oliver, New York Americans
- Lorne Chabot, New York Americans
- Roy Worters, New York Americans
- Bill Cook, New York Rangers
- Murray Murdoch, New York Rangers
- King Clancy, Toronto Maple Leafs
- Frank Finnigan, Toronto Maple Leafs

== See also ==
- 1936–37 NHL transactions
- List of Stanley Cup champions
- 1936 in sports
- 1937 in sports
