= List of Pittsburgh Pirates (NHL) players =

This is a complete list of ice hockey players who played for the Pittsburgh Pirates in the National Hockey League (NHL). It includes players that played at least one match, either in the NHL regular season or in the NHL playoffs. Granted a franchise by the NHL in 1925, the Pirates played in Pittsburgh from 1925 to 1930 and then moved to Philadelphia and became the Philadelphia Quakers. After their only season in Philadelphia, the franchise was cancelled due to financial problems. Philadelphia and Pittsburgh were each awarded an expansion team over a quarter of a century later, in 1967 (the Flyers and Penguins, respectively).

== Key ==
- Hockey Hall of Famer, or retired number.

Abbreviations
C	Center
D	Defenseman
L	Left Wing
R	Right Wing

Goaltenders
W	Wins
L	Losses
T	Ties
SO	Shutouts
GAA	Goals against average
SV%	Save percentage

Skaters
GP	Games played
G	Goals
A	Assists
Pts	Points
PIM	Penalty minutes

The "Seasons" column lists the first year of the season of the player's first game and the last year of the season of the player's last game. For example, a player who played one game in the 2000–2001 season would be listed as playing with the team from 2000–2001, regardless of what calendar year the game occurred within.

== Skaters ==
			Regular season					Playoffs				
Player	Position	Years	GP	G	A	Pts	PIM	GP	G	A	Pts	PIM
Ty Arbour	L	1926–1928	48	7	8	15	10	—	—	—	—	—
Cliff Barton	R	1929–1930	39	4	2	6	4	—	—	—	—	—
Louis Berlinquette	L	1925–1926	30	0	0	0	8	2	0	0	0	0
Edmond Bouchard	L	1928–1929	12	0	0	0	2	—	—	—	—	—
Archie Briden	L	1929–1930	29	4	3	7	20	—	—	—	—	—
Marty Burke	D	1927–1928	35	2	1	3	51	2	1	0	1	2
Odie Cleghorn	R	1925–1928	22	2	1	3	8	1	0	0	0	0
Lionel Conacher (1994)	D	1925–1927	42	9	4	13	76	2	0	0	0	0
Baldy Cotton	L	1925–1929	144	24	6	30	117	4	2	1	3	2
Harold Darragh	L	1925–1930	206	59	32	91	38	4	1	1	2	0
Herb Drury	D	1925–1930	189	24	11	35	193	4	1	1	2	0
Gord Fraser	D	1929–1930	30	6	4	10	37	—	—	—	—	—
Frank Fredrickson (1958)	C	1928–1930	40	7	14	21	48	—	—	—	—	—
Albert Holway	D	1928–1929	40	4	0	4	20	—	—	—	—	—
James Jarvis	L	1929–1930	44	11	8	19	32	—	—	—	—	—
Charlie Langlois	R	1926–1928	44	5	1	6	44	—	—	—	—	—
Fred Lowrey	R	1925–1926	16	0	0	0	2	2	0	0	0	6
Gerry Lowrey	L	1928–1930	56	18	15	33	36	—	—	—	—	—
Mickey MacKay	C	1928–1929	10	1	0	1	2	—	—	—	—	—
Rennison Manners	C	1929–1930	33	3	2	5	14	—	—	—	—	—
Bert McCaffrey	R	1927–1930	92	10	7	17	60	—	—	—	—	—
Duke McCurry	L	1925–1929	148	21	11	32	119	4	0	2	2	2
Mickey McGuire (1952)	L	1926–1928	36	3	0	3	6	—	—	—	—	—
John McKinnon	D	1926–1930	167	27	10	37	178	2	0	0	0	4
Hib Milks	L	1925–1930	209	70	28	98	125	4	0	0	0	2
Sam Rothschild	L	1927–1928	12	0	0	0	0	—	—	—	—	—
Alf Skinner	R	1925–1926	7	0	0	0	2	—	—	—	—	—
Rodger Smith	D	1925–1930	201	20	4	24	172	4	3	0	3	0
Jesse Spring	D	1925–1930	59	6	0	6	43	2	0	2	2	2
Tex White	R	1925–1930	181	28	11	39	131	2	0	0	0	2

== Goaltenders ==
		Regular season							Playoffs					
Player	Years	GP	W	L	T	SO	GAA	SV%	GP	W	L	SO	GAA	SV%
Joe Miller	1928–1930	87	14	62	11	11	2.87	—	—	—	—	—	—	—
Red Spooner	1929–1930	1	0	1	0	0	6.00	—	—	—	—	—	—	—
Roy Worters (1969)	1925–1928	123	52	59	12	22	1.99	—	4	1	2	0	3	—
