= 1928–29 NHL transactions =

The following is a list of all team-to-team transactions that have occurred in the National Hockey League (NHL) during the 1928–29 NHL season. It lists which team each player has been traded to and for which player(s) or other consideration(s), if applicable.

== Transactions ==
May 18, 1928	To Boston Bruins Red Green	To New York Americans Harry Connor
June 20, 1928	To Boston Bruins Eddie Rodden	To Toronto Maple Leafs cash
September 1, 1928	To Pittsburgh Pirates Mickey MacKay	To Chicago Black Hawks cash
September 1, 1928	To Detroit Cougars Bob Connors	To New York Americans cash
September 1, 1928	To Boston Bruins rights to Frank Waite	To New York Rangers cash
September 30, 1928	To Pittsburgh Pirates Albert Holway	To Montreal Maroons cash
October 1, 1928	To Toronto Maple Leafs George Horne	To Montreal Maroons Fred Elliott
October 14, 1928	To New York Americans Johnny Sheppard	To Detroit Cougars cash
October 15, 1928	To New York Americans Punch Broadbent	To Ottawa Senators cash
October 15, 1928	To New York Americans Charley McVeigh	To Chicago Black Hawks Alex McKinnon
October 17, 1928	To New York Americans Babe Dye	To Chicago Black Hawks $15,000 cash
October 18, 1928	To Toronto Maple Leafs Lorne Chabot $10,000 cash	To New York Rangers John Ross Roach
October 18, 1928	To Chicago Black Hawks Clem Loughlin	To Detroit Cougars cash
October 23, 1928	To Detroit Cougars Bernie Brophy	To Montreal Maroons cash
October 25, 1928	To Boston Bruins Cy Denneny	To Ottawa Senators cash
November 1, 1928	To Pittsburgh Pirates Joe Miller $20,000 cash	To New York Americans Roy Worters
November 13, 1928	To Ottawa Senators loan of Fred Elliott for the 1928-29 season	To Montreal Maroons cash
December 12, 1928	To New York Rangers Russell Oatman	To Montreal Maroons cash
December 21, 1928	To Boston Bruins Mickey MacKay $12,000 cash	To Pittsburgh Pirates Frank Fredrickson
January 9, 1929	To Montreal Canadiens loan of Herb Gardiner	To Chicago Black Hawks loan of Art Lesieur for the remainder of 1928-29 season
January 10, 1929	To Toronto Maple Leafs Eric Pettinger rights to Hugh Plaxton	To Boston Bruins rights to George Owen
January 21, 1929	To Boston Bruins rights to Myles Lane	To New York Rangers $7,500 cash
January 25, 1929	To Boston Bruins Bill Carson	To Toronto Maple Leafs cash
February 12, 1929	To Toronto Maple Leafs Baldy Cotton	To Pittsburgh Pirates Gerry Lowrey $9,500 cash
February 14, 1929	To Montreal Maroons George Boucher	To Ottawa Senators Joe Lamb
February 15, 1929	To Pittsburgh Pirates Jesse Spring loan of Edmond Bouchard for the remainder of 1928-29 season	To New York Americans loan of Tex White for the remainder of 1928-29 season
April 15, 1929	To Chicago Black Hawks rights to Taffy Abel	To New York Rangers $15,000 cash
