= Wilfred White (ice hockey) =

Canadian ice hockey player (1900–1948)

- Born: June 26, 1900 Hillsburgh, Ontario, Canada
- Died: December 2, 1948 (aged 48) Port Colborne, Ontario, Canada
- Height: 5 ft 11 in (180 cm)
- Weight: 155 lb (70 kg; 11 st 1 lb)
- Position: Right wing
- Shot: Right
- Played for: Pittsburgh Pirates; New York Americans; Philadelphia Quakers; New Haven Eagles; Pittsburgh Yellow Jackets
- Playing career: 1923–1932

Wilfred Belmont "Tex" White (June 26, 1900 – December 2, 1948) was a Canadian professional ice hockey forward who played seven seasons in the National Hockey League for the Pittsburgh Pirates, New York Americans and Philadelphia Quakers between 1925 and 1931.

== Playing career ==
While White was addressed in numerous newspaper articles as "Tex", no explanation was ever given as to how he got that nickname.

From 1917 to 1923, White played with the Barrie Canoe Club, Toronto Canoe Club Paddlers (winning the 1920 Memorial Cup as national junior ice hockey champions), and Dunnville Dunnies of the Ontario Hockey Association. In 1923, after seeing how well the fans in Pittsburgh took to Lionel Conacher, the owner of the Pittsburgh Yellow Jackets, Roy Schooley asked Conachar to invite a number of his friends in Canada to play for his team. These players included Harold Cotton, Hib Milks, Harold Darragh, Rodger Smith, Duke McCurry, Roy Worters and White. White played for the Yellow Jackets for the next two seasons, helping the team win the United States Amateur Hockey Association title in each of those years. In 1925, the Yellow Jackets morphed into the NHL's Pittsburgh's Pirates. White made the transition to the NHL with several other key members of the team.

White was one of only five Pittsburgh players to play all five seasons for the Pirates. However he played for the New York Americans for 13 games at the end of the 1928-29 NHL season, and was sent to the New Haven Eagles, of the Canadian-American Hockey League, for 12 games in 1929-30.When financial issues associated with the Great Depression sent the Pirates across the state to Philadelphia, White stayed with the team, now renamed the Philadelphia Quakers. He scored three goals in his one month playing for the Quakers, with one of those goals being the game winner in the Quakers' first victory, over the Toronto Maple Leafs on November 25, 1930. However, White was traded, along with Rodger Smith, to the revived Pittsburgh Yellow Jackets for cash on December 16, 1930, following the Quakers' acquisition of Eddie McCalmon and D'Arcy Coulson. On March 17, 1931, White scored the lone goal for the Yellow Jackets against the London Tecumsehs. The win allowed Pittsburgh to clinch a playoff berth in the International Hockey League. He played in Pittsburgh before retiring from hockey in 1932.

White was found dead in his Canadian Corps Club room, located in Port Colborne, Ontario, on December 2, 1948. He had been working as a steward at the club for the previous three years.

== Career statistics ==
=== Regular season and playoffs ===
			Regular season					Playoffs
Season	Team	League	GP	G	A	Pts	PIM	GP	G	A	Pts	PIM
1917–18	Barrie Canoe Club	OHA Jr	—	—	—	—	—	—	—	—	—	—
1918–19	Barrie Canoe Club	OHA Jr	—	—	—	—	—	—	—	—	—	—
1919–20	Toronto Canoe Club	OHA Jr	—	—	—	—	—	—	—	—	—	—
1919–20	Toronto Canoe	M-Cup	—	—	—	—	—	12	35	3	38	—
1920–21	Dunnville Dunnies	OHA Int	—	—	—	—	—	—	—	—	—	—
1921–22	Dunnville Dunnies	OHA Int	—	—	—	—	—	—	—	—	—	—
1922–23	Dunnville Dunnies	OHA Int	—	—	—	—	—	—	—	—	—	—
1923–24	Pittsburgh Yellow Jackets	USAHA	20	11	0	11	—	13	1	1	2	—
1924–25	Pittsburgh Yellow Jackets	USAHA	39	7	0	7	—	8	1	0	1	—
1925–26	Pittsburgh Pirates	NHL	35	7	1	8	22	—	—	—	—	—
1926–27	Pittsburgh Pirates	NHL	43	5	4	9	21	—	—	—	—	—
1927–28	Pittsburgh Pirates	NHL	44	5	1	6	54	2	0	0	0	2
1928–29	Pittsburgh Pirates	NHL	30	3	4	7	18	—	—	—	—	—
1928–29	New York Americans	NHL	13	2	1	3	8	2	0	0	0	2
1929–30	New Haven Eagles	Can-Am	12	2	0	2	6	—	—	—	—	—
1930–31	Philadelphia Quakers	NHL	9	3	0	3	2	—	—	—	—	—
1930–31	Pittsburgh Yellow Jackets	IHL	35	9	7	16	12	6	1	0	1	6
1931–32	Pittsburgh Yellow Jackets	IHL	24	1	1	2	22	—	—	—	—	—
NHL totals			203	33	12	45	141	4	0	0	0	4
