= 1928–29 Chicago Black Hawks season =

NHL ice hockey team season

1928–29 Chicago Black Hawks
- Division: 5th American
- 1928–29 record: 7–29–8
- Home record: 3–13–6
- Road record: 4–16–2
- Goals for: 33
- Goals against: 85

Team information
- General manager: Frederic McLaughlin
- Coach: Herb Gardiner (5–23–4); Dick Irvin (2–6–4)
- Captain: Dick Irvin
- Arena: Chicago Coliseum; Detroit Olympia; Peace Bridge Arena

Team leaders
- Goals: Vic Ripley (11)
- Assists: Ty Arbour (4)
- Points: Vic Ripley (13)
- Penalty minutes: Bouncer Taylor (56)
- Wins: Chuck Gardiner (7)
- Goals against average: Chuck Gardiner (1.85)

The 1928–29 Chicago Black Hawks season was the team's third season of play. The Hawks would miss the playoffs for the second straight season.

== Regular season ==
The team was coming off a 7–34–3 season, in which they finished in last place in the league. The Black Hawks would let head coach Hugh Lehman go and hire Herb Gardiner to become the team's head coach. This season was also a long one for the club, as they finished with a league worst 7–29–8 record, and 25 points out of a playoff spot. Chicago would score an NHL record worst 33 goals, averaging less than a goal per game, while giving up 85 goals, which was the highest in the league. In one stretch from February 7 through February 28, the Hawks were shut out in eight consecutive games. Gardiner was fired after posting a 5–23–4 record, and for the remainder of the season, the Hawks used team captain Dick Irvin as a player-coach.

Due to the new Chicago Stadium, the new home of the Black Hawks, not being ready for the 1928–29 season, the team was only able to get ice time at Chicago Coliseum through January. Chicago would then play the rest of their "home" games in Detroit, Michigan, and Fort Erie, Ontario, in February and March.

Vic Ripley would have a team-high 13 points, which included 11 goals, which was 1/3 of the Hawks goal total. Dick Irvin would score six goals, while youngster Johnny Gottselig scored five. Goaltender Chuck Gardiner saw all the action in net, winning seven games, while posting a 1.85 GAA and earning five shutouts.

While they improved by their point total by five points over the previous season, they still were a long way from contending for a playoff spot.

=== November ===
The Black Hawks opened the 1928–29 season on a two-game road trip. In their season opener on November 15 in Toronto, the Black Hawks were shut out by the Toronto Maple Leafs by a score of 2–0. Two nights later, Chicago would lose to the Montreal Maroons 4–2 in Montreal. The club played their first home game of the season on November 20, as Chicago was shut out by the Pittsburgh Pirates 2–0. Two nights later, on November 22, the Black Hawks' losing streak extended to four games, as the New York Rangers narrowly defeated Chicago by a 2–1 score.

Chicago would finally earn a point in their fifth game of the season, tying the Boston Bruins 1–1 on November 25. The Hawks would close out November with an overtime loss to the New York Rangers.

Chicago opened the season with a 0–5–1 record in November, sitting in last place in the American Division. Chicago was eight points behind the division leading New York Rangers, and three points behind the Pittsburgh Pirates for fourth place.

=== December ===
The club snapped their winless skid, which if you include the final 10 games of the 1927–28 season, had extended to 16 games, with a 3–2 victory over the Pittsburgh Pirates in Pittsburgh. Chicago would drop their next two games on the road against the Ottawa Senators and Montreal Canadiens before returning home.

On December 11, the Black Hawks recorded their first home victory of the season, defeating the Ottawa Senators 2–1. The Black Hawks would follow up by being shutout in their next two games, losses to the New York Americans and Montreal Canadiens.

The Black Hawks faced the Boston Bruins in Boston for a Christmas Day game, as Chicago defeated the Bruins 2–1. The road trip continued into New York on two nights later, as Chicago won consecutive games for the first time all season, defeating the New York Americans 2–0. The road trip concluded in Detroit, as the Black Hawks lost to the Detroit Cougars in their final game of the month.

Chicago posted a record of 4–5–0 in December, bringing their overall win–loss record to 4–10–1, earning nine points, and remaining in last place in the American Division. The Black Hawks were 12 points behind the first place New York Rangers, and three points behind the Pittsburgh Pirates to get out of the division cellar.

=== January ===
The Black Hawks slumped to begin the New Year, losing their first four games of January, which extended their overall losing streak to five games. On January 10, Chicago ended the losing skid with a 1–1 tie against the Montreal Maroons. Three nights later, the Black Hawks tied their second straight game, this time with a 1–1 score against the Pittsburgh Pirates, extending their winless skid to seven games.

Following the two tie games, the Black Hawks would lose their next three games, being shutout in each game. On January 22, the Black Hawks broke the shutout streak with a goal against the Ottawa Senators, however, the winless skid continued, as the Hawks and Senators tied 1–1. Chicago would conclude the month with another three game losing streak, scoring only one goal in those three games.

The Hawks finished January winless, as they finished the month with a 0–10–3 record. At the end of the month, the Hawks win–loss record was 4–20–4, earning only 12 points, as they had the worst record in the NHL.

=== February ===
The winless streak continued at the start of February, as the Black Hawks lost 3–2 to the New York Rangers on February 2, extending the streak to 15 games. Three nights later, on February 5, the Black Hawks finally returned to the win column, as they shutout the Detroit Cougars 1–0, earning their first victory since December 27.

Following the win over the Cougars, the Black Hawks would not score another goal for the entire month. Chicago would be shutout in each of the next eight games, earning a 0–6–2 record over those games, as they twice played in 0–0 tie games. This would set an NHL record for most consecutive games being shutout, constituting 581:42 of game time without a goal.

Chicago earned a record of 1–7–2 in February, as they scored only three goals for the entire month. Overall, the Hawks win–loss record at the end of the month was 5–27–6, earning 16 points on the season, and remaining in last place in the league.

=== March ===
The Black Hawks opened March by finally snapping their goalless drought and ending their eight-game winless streak, as Chicago defeated the Montreal Maroons 2–1 on March 2. Three nights later, the Black Hawks lost a close game to the Pittsburgh Pirates by a 3–2 score in overtime.

In their final two home games of the season, the Black Hawks tied the Toronto Maple Leafs and ended their home schedule on a winning note, as they defeated the Pittsburgh Pirates 1–0 on March 10.

On March 12, the Black Hawks set a team record for goals against, as the Boston Bruins crushed Chicago by a score of 11–1. The season concluded two nights later, as Chicago tied the New York Rangers 1–1.

The Black Hawks earned a record of 2–2–2 in six games in March, which was the teams only non-losing monthly record during the season. The Black Hawks record of 7–29–8 earned the team 22 points, which ranked them in last in the NHL, four points behind the Pittsburgh Pirates.

=== Final standings ===
American Division
	GP	W	L	T	GF	GA	PIM	Pts
**Boston Bruins**	44	26	13	5	89	52	472	57
**New York Rangers**	44	21	13	10	72	65	384	52
**Detroit Cougars**	44	19	16	9	72	63	381	47
Pittsburgh Pirates	44	9	27	8	46	80	324	26
Chicago Black Hawks	44	7	29	8	33	85	363	22

Note: GP = Games Played, W = Wins, L = Losses, T = Ties, Pts = Points, GF = Goals For, GA = Goals Against
Teams that qualified for the playoffs are highlighted in bold.

=== Record vs. opponents ===
==== Vs. American Division ====
1928–29 NHL records
Team	**BOS**	**CHI**	**DET**	**NYR**	**PIT**	**Total**
Boston	—	4–1–1	4–1–1	5–1	5–1	**18–4–2**
Chicago	1–4–1	—	1–4–1	0–4–2	2–3–1	**4–15–5**
Detroit	1–4–1	4–1–1	—	1–4–1	5–1	**11–10–3**
N.Y. Rangers	1–5	4–0–2	4–1–1	—	4–0–2	**13–6–5**
Pittsburgh	1–5	3–2–1	1–5	0–4–2	—	**5–16–3**

==== Vs. Canadian Division ====
1928–29 NHL records
Team	**MTL**	**MTM**	**NYA**	**OTT**	**TOR**	**Total**
Boston	1–2–1	3–1	0–3–1	2–1–1	2–2	**8–9–3**
Chicago	0–4	1–2–1	1–3	1–2–1	0–3–1	**3–14–3**
Detroit	1–1–2	2–1–1	2–1–1	1–1–2	2–2	**8–6–6**
N.Y. Rangers	1–1–2	0–3–1	1–1–2	3–1	3–1	**8–7–5**
Pittsburgh	0–2–2	1–2–1	2–2	0–3–1	1–2–1	**4–11–5**

== Schedule and results ==
=== Regular season ===
1928–29 regular season
November

Game	Date	Visitor	Score	Home	Record	Points
1	November 15	Chicago Black Hawks	0–2	Toronto Maple Leafs	0–1–0	0
2	November 17	Chicago Black Hawks	2–4	Montreal Maroons	0–2–0	0
3	November 20	Pittsburgh Pirates	2–0	Chicago Black Hawks	0–3–0	0
4	November 22	New York Rangers	2–1	Chicago Black Hawks	0–4–0	0
5	November 25	Boston Bruins	1–1	Chicago Black Hawks	0–4–1	1
6	November 29	Chicago Black Hawks	2–3	New York Rangers	0–5–1	1

December

Game	Date	Visitor	Score	Home	Record	Points
7	December 1	Chicago Black Hawks	3–2	Pittsburgh Pirates	1–5–1	3
8	December 6	Chicago Black Hawks	0–2	Ottawa Senators	1–6–1	3
9	December 8	Chicago Black Hawks	1–2	Montreal Canadiens	1–7–1	3
10	December 11	Ottawa Senators	1–2	Chicago Black Hawks	2–7–1	5
11	December 16	New York Americans	1–0	Chicago Black Hawks	2–8–1	5
12	December 18	Montreal Canadiens	5–0	Chicago Black Hawks	2–9–1	5
13	December 25	Chicago Black Hawks	2–1	Boston Bruins	3–9–1	7
14	December 27	Chicago Black Hawks	2–0	New York Americans	4–9–1	9
15	December 30	Chicago Black Hawks	1–3	Detroit Cougars	4–10–1	9

January

Game	Date	Visitor	Score	Home	Record	Points
16	January 1	Detroit Cougars	2–1	Chicago Black Hawks	4–11–1	9
17	January 3	Toronto Maple Leafs	2–0	Chicago Black Hawks	4–12–1	9
18	January 6	Detroit Cougars	3–1	Chicago Black Hawks	4–13–1	9
19	January 8	Chicago Black Hawks	0–1	Pittsburgh Pirates	4–14–1	9
20	January 10	Montreal Maroons	1–1	Chicago Black Hawks	4–14–2	10
21	January 13	Pittsburgh Pirates	1–1	Chicago Black Hawks	4–14–3	11
22	January 15	Chicago Black Hawks	0–1	Montreal Canadiens	4–15–3	11
23	January 17	Chicago Black Hawks	0–1	New York Rangers	4–16–3	11
24	January 20	Boston Bruins	2–0	Chicago Black Hawks	4–17–3	11
25	January 22	Chicago Black Hawks	1–1	Ottawa Senators	4–17–4	12
26	January 26	Chicago Black Hawks	0–2	Toronto Maple Leafs	4–18–4	12
27	January 29	Chicago Black Hawks	1–4	Boston Bruins	4–19–4	12
28	January 31	Chicago Black Hawks	0–2	Montreal Maroons	4–20–4	12

February

Game	Date	Visitor	Score	Home	Record	Points
29	February 2	New York Rangers	3–2	Chicago Black Hawks^{1}	4–21–4	12
30	February 5	Chicago Black Hawks	1–0	Detroit Cougars	5–21–4	14
31	February 7	Chicago Black Hawks	0–1	New York Americans	5–22–4	14
32	February 9	New York Americans	1–0	Chicago Black Hawks^{2}	5–23–4	14
33	February 14	Montreal Canadiens	1–0	Chicago Black Hawks^{2}	5–24–4	14
34	February 16	Boston Bruins	3–0	Chicago Black Hawks^{2}	5–25–4	14
35	February 21	Ottawa Senators	3–0	Chicago Black Hawks^{1}	5–26–4	14
36	February 24	Detroit Cougars	0–0	Chicago Black Hawks^{1}	5–26–5	15
37	February 26	Chicago Black Hawks	0–3	Detroit Cougars	5–27–5	15
38	February 28	New York Rangers	0–0	Chicago Black Hawks^{1}	5–27–6	16

March

Game	Date	Visitor	Score	Home	Record	Points
39	March 2	Montreal Maroons	1–2	Chicago Black Hawks^{3}	6–27–6	18
40	March 5	Chicago Black Hawks	2–3	Pittsburgh Pirates	6–28–6	18
41	March 7	Toronto Maple Leafs	1–1	Chicago Black Hawks^{2}	6–28–7	19
42	March 10	Pittsburgh Pirates	0–1	Chicago Black Hawks^{2}	7–28–7	21
43	March 12	Chicago Black Hawks	1–11	Boston Bruins	7–29–7	21
44	March 14	Chicago Black Hawks	1–1	New York Rangers	7–29–8	22

Legend: Win (2 points) Loss (0 points) Tie (1 point)
Notes:
^1Game played at Detroit Olympia due to negotiation disputes with their home arena, the Chicago Coliseum.
^2Game played at Peace Bridge Arena due to negotiation disputes with their home arena, the Chicago Coliseum.
^3Game played at Windsor Arena due to negotiation disputes with their home arena, the Chicago Coliseum.

== Season stats ==
=== Scoring leaders ===
Player	GP	G	A	Pts	PIM
Vic Ripley	39	11	2	13	31
Johnny Gottselig	44	5	3	8	26
Dick Irvin	36	6	1	7	30
Ty Arbour	44	3	4	7	32
Mush March	35	3	3	6	6

=== Goaltending ===
Player	GP	TOI	W	L	T	GA	SO	GAA
Chuck Gardiner	44	2758	7	29	8	85	5	1.85

== See also ==
- 1928–29 NHL season
