= Duke McCurry =

Canadian ice hockey player (1900–1965)

- Born: June 13, 1900 Toronto, Ontario, Canada
- Died: November 8, 1965 (aged 65) Toronto, Ontario, Canada
- Height: 5 ft 8 in (173 cm)
- Weight: 160 lb (73 kg; 11 st 6 lb)
- Position: Left wing
- Shot: Left
- Played for: NHL; Pittsburgh Pirates; CFL; Toronto Argonauts
- Playing career: 1923–1931

Francis Joseph "Frank, Duke" McCurry (June 13, 1900 – November 8, 1965) was a Canadian professional ice hockey left winger who played 145 games in the National Hockey League, with the Pittsburgh Pirates between 1925 and 1929.

== Playing career ==
Born in Toronto, Ontario, McCurry played his junior hockey with the Toronto Canoe Club Paddlers in 1919-20 and led them to the 1920 Memorial Cup win with 21 goals and 32 points in 12 games.

He also played football for the Toronto Argonauts from 1922 to 1923, as well as captaining several baseball teams. McCurry was also a member of the all-star Canadian lacrosse team from 1920 to 1922, and was the welter-weight boxing champion of Canada in 1916.

From 1923 to 1925, he played in Pittsburgh with the USAHA's Pittsburgh Yellow Jackets. In September 1925, McCurry was signed as a free agent when the Yellow Jackets became the National Hockey League Pittsburgh Pirates, scoring 17 points in 36 games. McCurry remained with the Pirates for another three years but gradually lost his scoring touch, and in September 1929, the Pirates dealt him to the Montreal Maroons for cash. However, McCurry refused to report to Montreal, and he sat out the entire season. Although it was evident the Pirates did not want him, he liked the city of Pittsburgh and signed a one-year pact with the Pittsburgh Yellow Jackets, now playing in the IHL. He retired from hockey after the 1930-31 season.

== Post-playing career ==
After his athletic career, he retired to pursue a career as a doctor. McCurry moved to Pittsburgh, Pennsylvania, and took up dentistry, before returning to Toronto, in the 1930s. McCurry died in 1965 at the St. Michael's Hospital in Toronto, Ontario.

== Career statistics ==
=== Regular season and playoffs ===
			Regular season					Playoffs
Season	Team	League	GP	G	A	Pts	PIM	GP	G	A	Pts	PIM
1917–18	Toronto De La Salle	OHA Jr	—	—	—	—	—	—	—	—	—	—
1918–19	Parkdale Canoe Club	OHA Jr	—	—	—	—	—	—	—	—	—	—
1919–20	Toronto Canoe Club	OHA Jr	6	4	3	7	—	—	—	—	—	—
1919–20	Toronto Canoe Club	M-Cup	—	—	—	—	—	12	21	11	32	—
1920–21	Timmins AC	NOHA	—	—	—	—	—	—	—	—	—	—
1921–22	Timmins AC	NOHA	—	—	—	—	—	—	—	—	—	—
1922–23	Toronto Argonauts	OHA Sr	12	7	6	13	—	—	—	—	—	—
1923–24	Pittsburgh Yellow Jackets	USAHA	20	6	0	6	—	13	4	0	4	—
1924–25	Pittsburgh Yellow Jackets	USAHA	37	6	0	6	—	8	2	0	2	—
1925–26	Pittsburgh Pirates	NHL	36	13	4	17	32	2	0	2	2	2
1926–27	Pittsburgh Pirates	NHL	33	3	3	6	23	—	—	—	—	—
1927–28	Pittsburgh Pirates	NHL	44	5	3	8	60	2	0	0	0	0
1928–29	Pittsburgh Pirates	NHL	35	0	1	1	4	—	—	—	—	—
1930–31	Pittsburgh Yellow Jackets	IHL	36	8	3	11	42	6	0	0	0	0
NHL totals			148	21	11	32	119	4	0	2	2	2
