= List of Pittsburgh Pirates (NHL) head coaches =

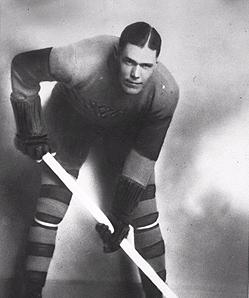
Frank Fredrickson was the Pirates coach during the team's last season in Pittsburgh, 1929–30.

This is a complete list of head coaches of the Pittsburgh Pirates and Philadelphia Quakers in the National Hockey League (NHL). Granted a franchise by the NHL in 1925, the Pirates played in Pittsburgh from 1925 to 1930 and then moved to Philadelphia and became the Philadelphia Quakers. After their only season in Philadelphia, the franchise was cancelled due to financial problems. Both cities were awarded expansion teams over a quarter of a century later (the Flyers and Penguins).

== Key ==
†	Hockey Hall of Famer (HHOF)
No.	Number of coaches
G	Games coached
W	Wins
L	Losses
T	Ties
P	Points
P%	Points percentage
W%	Winning percentage

== Coaches ==
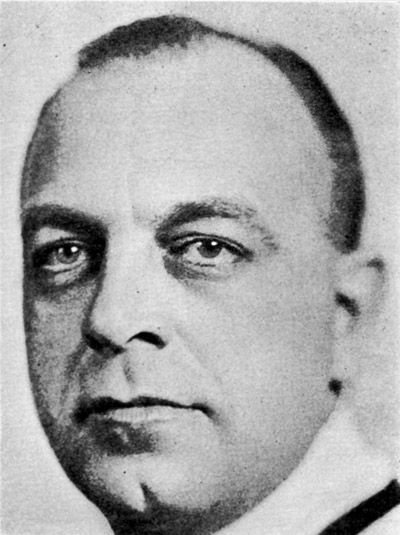
Cooper Smeaton was the head coach during the franchise's lone season in Philadelphia.

No.	Name	Seasons	G	W	L	T	P	P%	G	W	L	T	W%	Notes	Ref
No.	Name	Seasons	Regular season						Playoffs					Notes	Ref
1	Odie Cleghorn	1925–1929	168	62	86	20	144	.429	4	1	2	1	.375		
2	Frank Fredrickson†	1929–1930	44	5	36	3	13	.148	—	—	—	—	—	HHOF 1958 (Note: Frank Fredrickson was inducted as a player in 1958.)	
3	Cooper Smeaton†	1930–1931	44	4	36	4	12	.136	—	—	—	—	—	HHOF 1961 (Note: Cooper Smeaton was inducted as an on-ice official the first year that category was created.)	

== See also ==
- List of NHL head coaches
