= Andy Blair (ice hockey) =

Canadian ice hockey player (1908–1977)

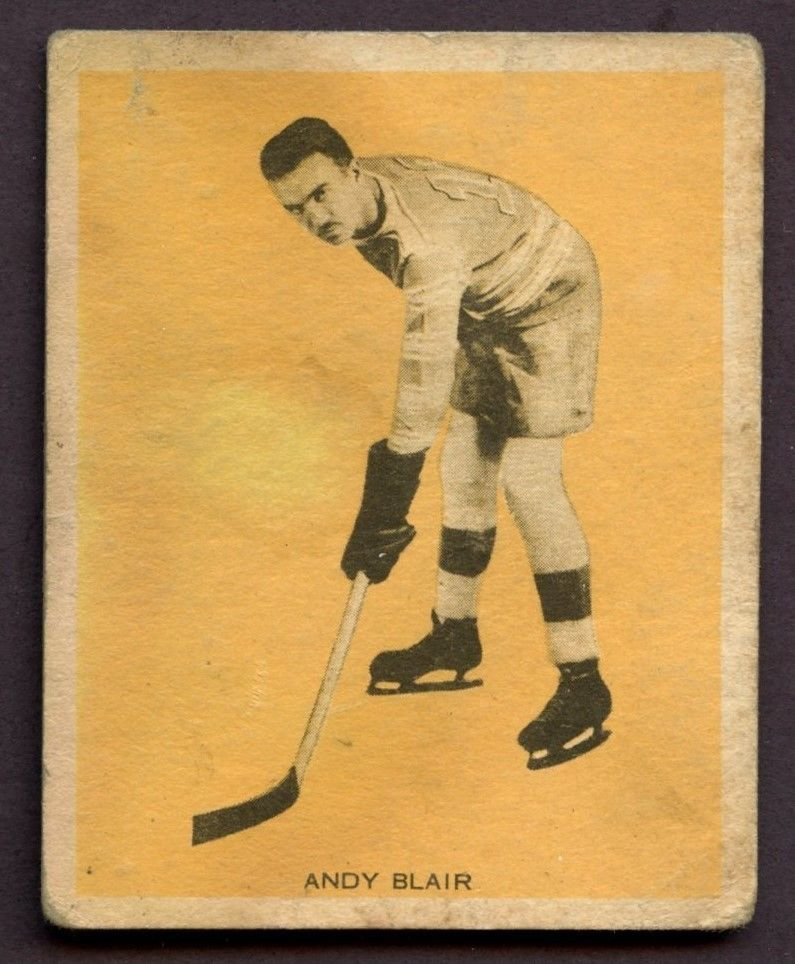
- 1933 hockey card of Andy Blair
- Born: February 27, 1908 Winnipeg, Manitoba, Canada
- Died: December 27, 1977 (aged 69) Seattle, Washington
- Height: 6 ft 2 in (188 cm)
- Weight: 177 lb (80 kg; 12 st 9 lb)
- Position: Centre
- Shot: Left
- Played for: Toronto Maple Leafs; Chicago Black Hawks
- Playing career: 1928–1937

Andrew Dryden Blair (February 27, 1908 – December 27, 1977) was a Canadian professional hockey player who played for the Toronto Maple Leafs and the Chicago Black Hawks of the National Hockey League between 1928 and 1937.

Blair was born in Winnipeg, Manitoba, and was a graduate of the University of Manitoba. He was a cousin of Murray Dryden, whose son Ken Dryden was president of the Leafs in the 1990s.

== Career statistics ==
=== Regular season and playoffs ===
			Regular season					Playoffs
Season	Team	League	GP	G	A	Pts	PIM	GP	G	A	Pts	PIM
1923–24	University of Manitoba	MHL	2	0	0	0	2	1	0	0	0	0
1924–25	University of Manitoba	WJrHL	9	14	4	18	4	8	10	1	11	6
1924–25	University of Manitoba	M-Cup	—	—	—	—	—	5	8	0	8	8
1925–26	University of Manitoba	MHL	4	5	1	6	—	—	—	—	—	—
1926–27	University of Manitoba	Exhib	1	1	1	2	—	—	—	—	—	—
1926–27	University of Manitoba	Al-Cup	—	—	—	—	—	2	0	0	0	8
1927–28	University of Manitoba	MHL	10	11	8	19	16	2	0	0	0	10
1927–28	Winnipeg CPR	WSrHL	4	3	2	5	2	—	—	—	—	—
1927–28	University of Manitoba	Al-Cup	—	—	—	—	—	5	3	2	5	10
1928–29	Toronto Maple Leafs	NHL	44	12	15	27	41	4	3	0	3	2
1929–30	Toronto Maple Leafs	NHL	42	11	10	22	27	—	—	—	—	—
1930–31	Toronto Maple Leafs	NHL	44	11	8	19	32	2	1	0	1	0
1931–32	Toronto Maple Leafs	NHL	48	9	14	23	35	7	2	2	4	6
1932–33	Toronto Maple Leafs	NHL	43	6	9	15	38	9	0	2	2	4
1933–34	Toronto Maple Leafs	NHL	47	14	9	23	35	5	0	2	2	16
1934–35	Toronto Maple Leafs	NHL	45	6	14	20	22	2	0	0	0	2
1935–36	Toronto Maple Leafs	NHL	45	5	4	9	60	9	0	0	0	2
1936–37	Chicago Black Hawks	NHL	44	0	3	3	33	—	—	—	—	—
NHL totals			401	74	86	160	323	36	6	6	12	32

== Awards and achievements ==
- Allan Cup Championship (1928)
- 1932 Stanley Cup Champion (Toronto Maple Leafs)
- Played in NHL All-Star Game (1934)
- Honoured Member of the Manitoba Hockey Hall of Fame
