= Cooper Smeaton =

Canadian ice hockey coach, official (1890–1978)

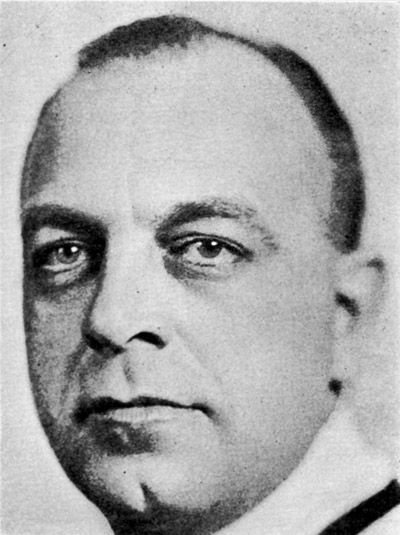
- Born: James Cooper Smeaton; July 22, 1890; Carleton Place, Ontario, Canada
- Died: October 3, 1978 (aged 88); Montreal, Quebec, Canada
- Known for: Ice hockey referee and coach
- Honours: Hockey Hall of Fame (1961)

James Cooper Smeaton (July 22, 1890 – October 3, 1978) was a Canadian professional ice hockey player, referee and head coach. He served referee-in-chief of the National Hockey League (NHL) from 1917 until 1937. Smeaton served as a Stanley Cup trustee from 1946 until his death in 1978. He was inducted into the Hockey Hall of Fame in 1961.

== Biography ==
Smeaton was born in Carleton Place, Ontario. When he was three years of age, his family moved to the Westmount suburb of Montreal, Quebec. During his youth, Smeaton played baseball, football and ice hockey for the Westmount Amateur Athletic Association. By 1908, he had started refereeing ice hockey games, including those of the Montreal Insurance Hockey League.

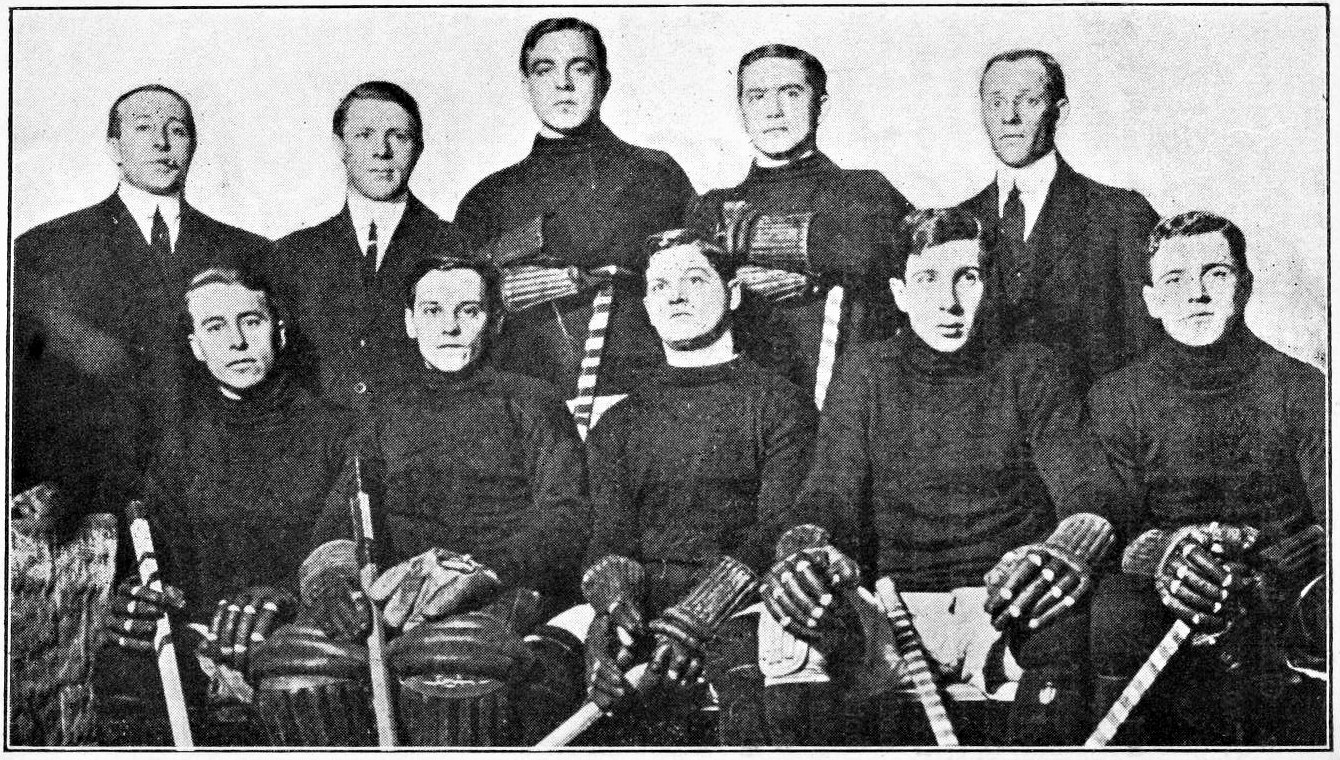
Smeaton, in the middle in the back row, with the 1910 New York Wanderers. Sprague and Odie Cleghorn are seated at the right in the front row.

Smeaton moved to New York in 1910 and played one season of point for the New York Wanderers, while working for Spalding Sporting Goods. On the New York Wanderers team he played alongside fellow Montreal Westmount products Sprague and Odie Cleghorn. Although praised by the Brooklyn Daily Eagle after the season as the best point player in the league (AAHL) the newspaper also pointed out that the Wanderers were involved in many rough house incidents and that Smeaton's "principal fault lies in the fact that he is inclined not only toward dirty play, but also left a poor impression upon many of the spectators through his actions on the ice."

Smeaton returned to Montreal for family reasons and joined Sun Life Insurance and started refereeing amateur games as a sideline. In 1913, he joined the National Hockey Association (NHA) as a referee. In his first game in 1913, between the Montreal Canadiens and the Montreal Wanderers, he was confronted by Newsy Lalonde after calling an offside. Smeaton promptly fined Lalonde $5 (Lalonde, known as a bit of a "tightwad", never repeated the incident).

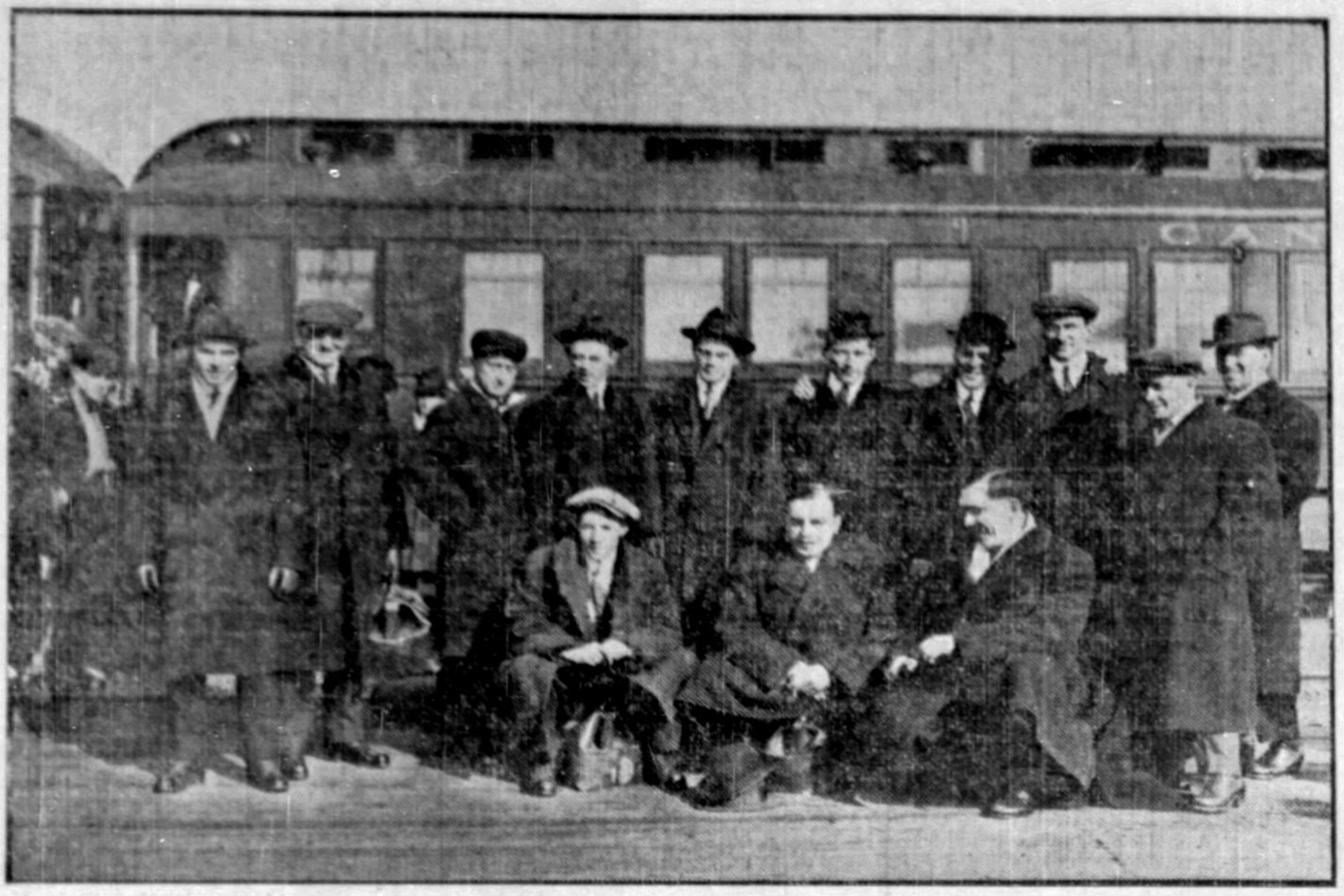
Smeaton, sitting in the middle in the front row, with players and staff of the Grand-Mère Hockey Club prior to the 1914 Allan Cup challenge series between Grand-Mère and the Regina Victorias.

In 1914, Smeaton joined the Canadian military to serve in the First World War. He served with the 11th Canadian Siege Battery in France, and was awarded the Military Medal for his service. Smeaton was later active in the Norman Mitchell VC Branch of the Royal Canadian Legion in Mount Royal, where he lived. In September 1959, Smeaton organized a fund-raising intra-squad game by the Montreal Canadiens to benefit the branch's welfare fund.

Smeaton became the NHL's first referee-in-chief when the NHL formed in 1917. He was offered the general manager's job of the expansion New York Rangers in 1926, but turned it down to remain in Montreal. He served as referee until 1930 when he became the head coach of the Philadelphia Quakers. The Quakers played only one season, 1930–31, finishing out of the playoffs. The following season, Smeaton resumed refereeing. He refereed in the NHL until 1937 when he retired. Smeaton, who officiated numerous Stanley Cup and Allan Cup finals, was inducted as an on-ice official into the Hockey Hall of Fame in 1961.

Part of the reason Smeaton retired from hockey was to attend to his business career. He retired to accept a promotion to assistant branch manager at Sun Life. Smeaton later became Ottawa branch manager before returning to Montreal to become Montreal branch manager in 1944. He continued working at Sun Life until retiring in 1954. Smeaton also served as president of the Montreal Life Insurance Underwriters Association.

P. D. Ross appointed Smeaton trustee of the Stanley Cup on February 24, 1946, replacing the late William Foran. During his term as trustee, the NHL was given formal control over the Stanley Cup. While the Cup had been the de facto NHL championship trophy since 1926, giving full control of the Cup to the league allowed it to unilaterally reject challenges from other leagues. As part of his duties Smeaton would, on occasion, present the Cup to the Stanley-Cup winning championship team.

Smeaton remained active in retirement with golf. He died on October 3, 1978, at the Royal Victoria Hospital in Montreal, survived by his wife Victoria. Smeaton is buried in Mount Royal Cemetery in Montreal.

== NHL coaching record ==
Team	Year	Regular season						Postseason
Team	Year	G	W	L	T	Pts	Division rank	Result
Philadelphia Quakers	1930–31	44	4	36	4	12	5th in American	Missed playoffs

Preceded by Pittsburgh Pirates coaches Frank Fredrickson	Head coach of the Philadelphia Quakers; 1930–31	Succeeded by Position abolished
