= Dolly Dolson =

Canadian ice hockey player

- Born: May 23, 1897; Hespeler, Ontario, Canada
- Died: August 19, 1978 (aged 81)
- Height: 5 ft 7 in (170 cm)
- Weight: 161 lb (73 kg; 11 st 7 lb)
- Position: Goaltender
- Caught: Left
- Played for: Detroit Falcons; Detroit Cougars
- Playing career: 1923–1933

Clarence Edward "Dolly" Dolson (May 23, 1897 — August 19, 1978) was a Canadian ice hockey player who played 93 games in the National Hockey League between 1928 and 1931 with the Detroit Cougars/Falcons. He has 35 wins, 41 loses, and 17 ties with a 1.98 GAA. He was born in Hespeler, Ontario.

== Career statistics ==
=== Regular season and playoffs ===
			Regular season								Playoffs
Season	Team	League	GP	W	L	T	Min	GA	SO	GAA	GP	W	L	T	Min	GA	SO	GAA
1914–15	Galt Garrison	OHA Jr	6	3	3	0	360	18	0	3.00	—	—	—	—	—	—	—	—
1919–20	Galt Terriers	OHA Int	—	—	—	—	—	—	—	—	—	—	—	—	—	—	—	—
1920–21	Galt Terriers	OHA Int	—	—	—	—	—	—	—	—	—	—	—	—	—	—	—	—
1921–22	Galt Terriers	OHA Int	—	—	—	—	—	—	—	—	—	—	—	—	—	—	—	—
1922–23	Galt Terriers	OHA Int	1	1	0	0	40	0	0	0.00	—	—	—	—	—	—	—	—
1923–24	Stratford Indians	OHA Sr	12	9	2	1	730	28	2	2.30	2	1	1	0	120	4	0	2.00
1924–25	Stratford Indians	OHA Sr	20	12	8	0	1230	63	2	3.07	2	1	1	0	120	6	1	3.00
1925–26	Stratford Indians	OHA Sr	20	6	13	1	1280	66	0	3.09	—	—	—	—	—	—	—	—
1925–26	Montreal CNR	MRTHL	1	1	0	0	60	1	0	1.00	1	1	0	0	60	1	0	1.00
1926–27	Stratford Nationals	Can-Pro	30	19	11	0	1835	76	2	2.49	2	0	2	0	120	4	0	2.00
1927–28	Stratford Nationals	Can-Pro	41	24	12	5	2520	51	11	1.21	5	4	0	1	300	3	2	0.60
1928–29	Detroit Cougars	NHL	44	19	16	9	2750	63	10	1.37	2	0	2	0	120	7	0	3.50
1929–30	Detroit Cougars	NHL	5	0	4	1	320	24	0	4.50	—	—	—	—	—	—	—	—
1929–30	London Panthers	IHL	31	—	—	—	1860	60	5	1.94	2	0	2	0	120	4	0	2.00
1930–31	Detroit Falcons	NHL	44	16	21	7	2750	105	6	2.29	—	—	—	—	—	—	—	—
1931–32	Cleveland Indians	IHL	14	2	9	3	880	54	0	3.68	—	—	—	—	—	—	—	—
1932–33	Cleveland Indians	IHL	10	—	—	—	600	36	0	3.60	—	—	—	—	—	—	—	—
NHL totals			93	35	41	17	5820	192	16	1.98	2	0	2	0	120	7	0	3.50
