= Fred Lowrey =

Canadian ice hockey player

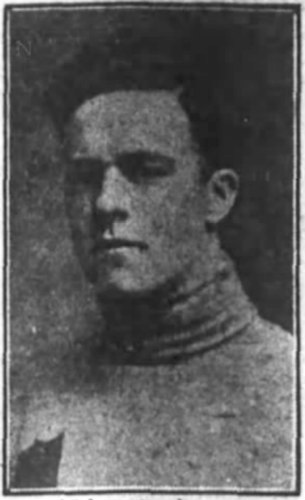
- Born: August 12, 1902 Ottawa, Ontario, Canada
- Died: January 24, 1968 (aged 65)
- Height: 5 ft 9 in (175 cm)
- Weight: 155 lb (70 kg; 11 st 1 lb)
- Position: Right wing
- Shot: Right
- Played for: Pittsburgh Pirates; Montreal Maroons
- Playing career: 1924–1932

Frederick John "Frock" Lowrey (August 12, 1902 – January 24, 1968) was a Canadian professional ice hockey defenceman who played 54 games in the National Hockey League for the Pittsburgh Pirates and Montreal Maroons. Fred is the brother of former NHL players Eddie and Gerry Lowrey. Three other brothers – Tom, Frank and Bill – played with lower level teams in the Ottawa City Hockey League.

== Career statistics ==
=== Regular season and playoffs ===
			Regular season					Playoffs
Season	Team	League	GP	G	A	Pts	PIM	GP	G	A	Pts	PIM
1917–18	Ottawa Landsdownes	OCHL	1	0	0	0	0	—	—	—	—	—
1918–19	Ottawa Military HQ	OCHL	6	1	0	1	3	—	—	—	—	—
1919–20	Ottawa Munitions	OCHL	8	2	0	2	—	5	3	1	4	—
1920–21	Quebec Royal Rifles	QCHL	11	13	0	13	—	4	1	0	1	—
1921–22	Ottawa Munitions	OCHL	13	12	3	15	18	—	—	—	—	—
1922–23	Westminster Hockey Club	USAHA	9	15	0	15	—	—	—	—	—	—
1923–24	New Haven Bruins	USAHA	12	7	0	7	—	—	—	—	—	—
1924–25	Montreal Maroons	NHL	27	0	1	1	6	—	—	—	—	—
1925–26	Montreal Maroons	NHL	10	1	0	1	2	—	—	—	—	—
1925–26	Pittsburgh Pirates	NHL	16	0	0	0	2	2	0	0	0	0
1926–27	Quebec Castors	Can-Am	9	0	1	1	0	—	—	—	—	—
1926–27	New Haven Eagles	Can-Am	22	4	0	4	21	4	1	0	1	0
1927–28	Philadelphia Arrows	Can-Am	29	11	2	13	25	—	—	—	—	—
1928–29	Philadelphia Arrows	Can-Am	5	0	0	0	4	—	—	—	—	—
1928–29	London Panthers	Can-Pro	22	2	0	2	0	—	—	—	—	—
1929–30	Niagara Falls Cataracts	IHL	37	10	3	13	28	—	—	—	—	—
1930–31	Pittsburgh Yellow Jackets	IHL	1	0	1	1	2	—	—	—	—	—
1930–31	Buffalo Majors	AHA	5	0	0	0	0	—	—	—	—	—
1930–31	Niagara Falls Catracts	OPJHL	26	11	2	13	6	5	2	3	5	0
1931–32	Philadelphia Arrows	Can-Am	13	1	1	2	4	—	—	—	—	—
1933–34	Ottawa Rideaus	OCHL	10	4	0	4	10	—	—	—	—	—
1934–35	Ottawa RCAF Flyers	OCHL	8	10	0	10	8	5	1	0	1	4
1935–36	Ottawa RCAF Flyers	OCHL	17	1	0	1	4	—	—	—	—	—
1936–37	Trenton RCAF	OHA Sr	—	—	—	—	—	—	—	—	—	—
NHL totals			53	1	1	2	10	2	0	0	0	0
