= Francis Moore (ice hockey) =

Canadian ice hockey player and executive (1900–1976)

Olympic medal record

Men's Ice hockey
Silver medal – second place	1936 Garmisch-Partenkirchen	Team competition

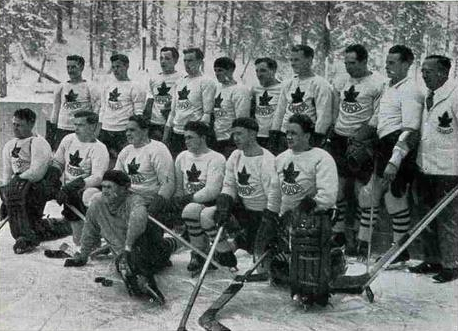
Canada men's national ice hockey team at the 1936 Winter Olympics

Francis William "Dinty" Moore (October 29, 1900 – January 21, 1976) was a Canadian goaltender who competed in ice hockey at the 1936 Winter Olympics.

== Playing ==
Moore was born in Barrie, Ontario and helped lead the Barrie Colts to the 1918 OHA Junior finals. He then moved to Toronto, where he played for the Athenaeums. In 1919, he joined the Toronto Canoe Club Paddlers and helped the club win the 1920 Memorial Cup. During the 1921–22 season, he was one of many Canadian players who were part of the Westminster Hockey Club that captured the United States Amateur Hockey Association championship. The following season, he played for the USAHA's Milwaukee Brewers. He returned to Canada in 1923 and began a long tenure with the Port Colborne Sailors. He was added to the 1936 Canadian Olympic hockey team by the Canadian Amateur Hockey Association after four members of the Halifax Wolverines were dropped from the team. Canada lost the gold medal to Great Britain, which Moore blamed on the Canadians misunderstanding how the Olympic playoff system worked.

== Executive ==
Moore spent his later years with the Sailors as a playing manager and served on the executive committee of the Ontario Hockey Association. He was the league's vice president from 1938 to 1941 and was president of the OHA from 1942 through 1945. He was the assistant to Sudbury Wolves manager and coach Max Silverman during the 1949 Ice Hockey World Championships.

== Honours ==
Moore was made a lifetime member of the Ontario Hockey Association in 1962. Since 1976, the F. W. "Dinty" Moore Trophy has been given annually to the Ontario Hockey League rookie goaltender with the best regular season goals against average.

In 1987, Moore was inducted into the Northwestern Ontario Sports Hall of Fame as a member of the 1936 Olympic team. He was inducted into the Barrie Sports Hall of Fame in 1989 as an athlete and builder.
