= 1920 Memorial Cup =

Canadian junior ice hockey championship

The Memorial Cup trophy

The 1920 Memorial Cup final was the second junior ice hockey championship of the Canadian Amateur Hockey Association. The George Richardson Memorial Trophy champions Toronto Canoe Club Paddlers of the Ontario Hockey Association competed against the Abbott Cup champions Selkirk Fishermen of the Manitoba Junior Hockey League. In a two-game, total goal series, held at the Arena Gardens in Toronto, Ontario, Toronto won their first Memorial Cup, defeating Selkirk 15–5.

== Background ==
The Toronto Canoe Club had played the Stratford Midgets for the Ontario championship, losing the first game 6–5 before winning the second 10–2, taking the series on total goals. They won the eastern Canadian championship by defeating Loyola College 16–4 in a one-game playoff. Selkirk won the western Canadian championship by defeating the Calgary Monarchs in a two-game total-goal series, winning the first game 8–2 and tying the second, 3–3.

== Games ==
The first game was played on March 23. Toronto won 10–1. The second game was on March 25, with Toronto winning 5–4. Toronto's Billy Burch was the scoring champion, with 4 goals and 3 assists in the two games.

After the series the Fort William Beavers issued a challenge to Toronto for the title, which was accepted. One game was played on March 31, which Toronto won 11–1.

== Winning roster ==
Harold Applegath, Billy Burch, Lionel Conacher, Sydney Hueston, Cyril Kelly, Duke McCurry, John Mollenhauer, Frank Moore, Wilfred White, Roy Worters. Coach: Dick Carroll
