= Archie Briden =

Canadian ice hockey player (1897–1974)

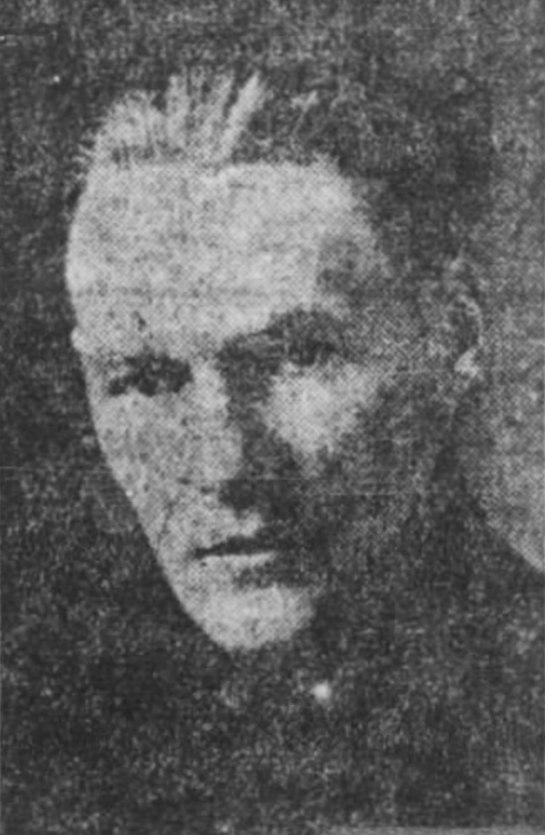
- Born: July 16, 1897 Hintonburg, Ontario, Canada
- Died: June 8, 1974 (aged 76) Haileybury, Ontario, Canada
- Height: 5 ft 8 in (173 cm)
- Weight: 170 lb (77 kg; 12 st 2 lb)
- Position: Left wing
- Shot: Left
- Played for: Pittsburgh Pirates; Detroit Cougars; Boston Bruins; Calgary Tigers; Edmonton Eskimos; Victoria Cougars; Seattle Metropolitans; Toronto Blueshirts
- Playing career: 1916–1932

Edward Archibald "Red" Briden (July 16, 1897 – June 8, 1974) was a Canadian professional ice hockey player who played 14 games in the National Hockey Association, 72 games in the National Hockey League, 82 games in the Pacific Coast Hockey Association, and 55 games in the Western Canada Hockey League between 1916 and 1932. He played with the Toronto Blueshirts, Seattle Metropolitans, Victoria Cougars, Edmonton Eskimos, Calgary Tigers, Pittsburgh Pirates, Boston Bruins, and Detroit Cougars.

He was raised in Renfrew, Ontario.

== Career statistics ==
=== Regular season and playoffs ===
			Regular season					Playoffs
Season	Team	League	GP	G	A	Pts	PIM	GP	G	A	Pts	PIM
1912–13	Cobalt Mines	CoMHL	3	1	0	1	0	—	—	—	—	—
1912–13	Haileybury Rexalls	Exib	3	1	0	1	3	—	—	—	—	—
1913–14	Cobalt Mines	CoMHL	—	—	—	—	—	—	—	—	—	—
1914–15	Haileybury Rexalls	NOHA	—	—	—	—	—	—	—	—	—	—
1915–16	Cleveland Indians	USAHA	—	—	—	—	—	—	—	—	—	—
1916–17	Toronto Blueshirts	NHA	13	4	2	6	12	—	—	—	—	—
1919–20	Edmonton Eskimos	Big-4	12	10	8	18	21	2	2	0	2	4
1920–21	Edmonton Eskmios	Big-4	15	18	7	25	12	—	—	—	—	—
1921–22	Seattle Metropolitans	PCHA	24	1	2	3	12	2	0	0	0	3
1922–23	Seattle Metropolitans	PCHA	30	7	3	10	27	—	—	—	—	—
1923–24	Seattle Metropolitans	PCHA	18	7	0	7	24	—	—	—	—	—
1923–24	Victoria Cougars	PCHA	12	9	1	10	4	—	—	—	—	—
1924–25	Edmonton Eskimos	WCHL	28	17	6	23	33	—	—	—	—	—
1925–26	Calgary Tigers	WHL	26	14	2	16	10	—	—	—	—	—
1926–27	Boston Bruins	NHL	16	2	2	4	8	—	—	—	—	—
1926–27	Detroit Cougars	NHL	26	3	0	3	28	—	—	—	—	—
1927–28	Philadelphia Arrows	Can-Am	37	13	3	16	26	—	—	—	—	—
1928–29	Philadelphia Arrows	Can-Am	40	12	5	17	46	—	—	—	—	—
1929–30	Pittsburgh Pirates	NHL	29	4	3	7	20	—	—	—	—	—
1929–30	London Panthers	IHL	16	3	0	3	14	2	0	0	0	2
1930–31	London Tecumsehs	IHL	12	0	2	2	16	—	—	—	—	—
1930–31	Cleveland Indians	IHL	34	8	11	19	20	6	2	2	4	2
1931–32	Cleveland Indians	IHL	48	6	10	16	16	—	—	—	—	—
NHA totals			13	4	2	6	12	—	—	—	—	—
PCHA totals			82	24	6	30	67	2	0	0	0	3
WCHL/WHL totals			54	31	8	39	43	—	—	—	—	—
NHL totals			71	9	5	14	56	—	—	—	—	—
