= Cliff Barton =

American ice hockey player (1907–1969)

- Born: September 3, 1907 Sault Ste. Marie, Michigan, US
- Died: September 14, 1969 (aged 62)
- Height: 5 ft 6 in (168 cm)
- Weight: 160 lb (73 kg; 11 st 6 lb)
- Position: Right wing
- Shot: Right
- Played for: Pittsburgh Pirates; Philadelphia Quakers; New York Rangers
- Playing career: 1929–1944

Clifford John Barton (September 3, 1907 – September 14, 1969) was an American professional ice hockey right winger. He was born in Michigan but moved to Port Arthur, Ontario, at an early age. Barton played three seasons in the National Hockey League (NHL) for the Pittsburgh Pirates, Philadelphia Quakers, and New York Rangers between 1929 and 1940. The rest of his career was spent in different minor leagues.

== Career statistics ==
=== Regular season and playoffs ===
| | | | Regular season | | | | | Playoffs |
| Season | Team | League | GP | G | A | Pts | PIM | GP | G | A | Pts | PIM |
|---|---|---|---|---|---|---|---|---|---|---|---|---|
| 1923–24 | Port Arthur Bruins | TBJHL | 6 | 1 | 0 | 1 | — | — | — | — | — | — |
| 1924–25 | Port Arthur Bruins | TBJHL | 10 | 8 | 2 | 10 | — | 2 | 0 | 0 | 0 | 0 |
| 1925–26 | Port Arthur Bruins | TBJHL | 10 | 11 | 1 | 12 | — | 1 | 1 | 1 | 2 | 2 |
| 1926–27 | Port Arthur Bruins | TBJHL | 14 | 14 | 6 | 20 | — | 3 | 1 | 1 | 2 | 4 |
| 1926–27 | Port Arthur Bruins | M-Cup | — | — | — | — | — | 6 | 9 | 2 | 11 | 2 |
| 1927–28 | Port Arthur Ports | TBSHL | 21 | 13 | 6 | 19 | 15 | — | — | — | — | — |
| 1928–29 | Port Arthur Ports | TBSHL | 20 | 10 | 8 | 18 | 12 | 2 | 0 | 0 | 0 | 2 |
| 1928–29 | Port Arthur Ports | Al-Cup | — | — | — | — | — | 7 | 4 | 0 | 4 | 4 |
| 1929–30 | Pittsburgh Pirates | NHL | 39 | 4 | 2 | 6 | 4 | — | — | — | — | — |
| 1930–31 | Philadelphia Quakers | NHL | 43 | 6 | 7 | 13 | 18 | — | — | — | — | — |
| 1931–32 | Pittsburgh Yellow Jackets | IHL | 39 | 2 | 3 | 5 | 39 | — | — | — | — | — |
| 1931–32 | Springfield Indians | Can-Am | 2 | 0 | 0 | 0 | 0 | — | — | — | — | — |
| 1932–33 | Buffalo Bisons | IHL | 40 | 1 | 2 | 3 | 12 | 5 | 0 | 0 | 0 | 0 |
| 1933–34 | Buffalo Bisons | IHL | 44 | 19 | 8 | 27 | 18 | 6 | 2 | 1 | 3 | 4 |
| 1934–35 | Buffalo Bisons | IHL | 44 | 18 | 8 | 26 | 43 | — | — | — | — | — |
| 1935–36 | Buffalo Bisons | IHL | 47 | 12 | 17 | 29 | 32 | 5 | 0 | 0 | 0 | 4 |
| 1936–37 | Buffalo Bisons | IAHL | 11 | 4 | 3 | 7 | 8 | — | — | — | — | — |
| 1936–37 | Philadelphia Ramblers | IAHL | 34 | 7 | 11 | 18 | 10 | 6 | 2 | 0 | 2 | 2 |
| 1937–38 | Philadelphia Ramblers | IAHL | 47 | 13 | 19 | 32 | 11 | 5 | 0 | 1 | 1 | 0 |
| 1938–39 | Philadelphia Ramblers | IAHL | 52 | 21 | 28 | 49 | 16 | 9 | 3 | 3 | 6 | 6 |
| 1939–40 | New York Rangers | NHL | 3 | 0 | 0 | 0 | 0 | — | — | — | — | — |
| 1939–40 | Philadelphia Ramblers | IAHL | 51 | 9 | 19 | 28 | 6 | — | — | — | — | — |
| 1940–41 | Hershey Bears | AHL | 6 | 1 | 1 | 2 | 0 | — | — | — | — | — |
| 1940–41 | St. Louis Flyers | AHA | 43 | 6 | 8 | 14 | 12 | 9 | 3 | 3 | 6 | 0 |
| 1941–42 | St. Louis Flyers | AHA | 50 | 26 | 22 | 48 | 22 | 3 | 0 | 0 | 0 | 2 |
| 1942–43 | New Haven Eagles | AHL | 12 | 2 | 9 | 11 | 0 | — | — | — | — | — |
| 1942–43 | Washington Lions | AHL | 22 | 6 | 12 | 18 | 0 | — | — | — | — | — |
| 1943–44 | Pittsburgh Hornets | AHL | 41 | 6 | 15 | 21 | 6 | — | — | — | — | — |
| IHL totals | | | 214 | 52 | 38 | 90 | 144 | 16 | 2 | 1 | 3 | 8 |
| IAHL/AHL totals | | | 276 | 69 | 117 | 186 | 57 | 20 | 5 | 4 | 9 | 8 |
| NHL totals | | | 85 | 10 | 9 | 19 | 22 | — | — | — | — | — |
