= Gerry Lowrey =

Canadian ice hockey player

- Born: February 14, 1905 Ottawa, Ontario, Canada
- Died: October 17, 1979 (aged 74)
- Height: 5 ft 8 in (173 cm)
- Weight: 150 lb (68 kg; 10 st 10 lb)
- Position: Left wing
- Shot: Left
- Played for: NHL; Pittsburgh Pirates; Philadelphia Quakers; Chicago Black Hawks; Toronto Maple Leafs; Ottawa Senators; CAHL; Quebec Beavers; Providence Reds; AHA; St. Paul Greyhounds; Tulsa Oilers; CPHL; London Panthers; Toronto Ravinas; IHL; Niagara Falls Cataracts
- Playing career: 1926–1937

Gerald Charles Lowrey (February 14, 1905 – October 17, 1979) was a Canadian ice hockey forward who played six seasons in the National Hockey League for the Toronto Maple Leafs, Pittsburgh Pirates, Philadelphia Quakers, Chicago Black Hawks and Ottawa Senators between 1927 and 1933. The rest of his career, which lasted from 1926 to 1937, was spent in various minor leagues. Born in Ottawa, Ontario, Lowrey's brothers Eddie and Fred Lowrey also played in the NHL. Three other brothers – Tom, Frank and Bill – played with lower level teams in the Ottawa City Hockey League.

== Career statistics ==
=== Regular season and playoffs ===
| | | | Regular season | | | | | Playoffs |
| Season | Team | League | GP | G | A | Pts | PIM | GP | G | A | Pts | PIM |
|---|---|---|---|---|---|---|---|---|---|---|---|---|
| 1921–22 | University of Ottawa | OCHL | 12 | 0 | 2 | 2 | 6 | — | — | — | — | — |
| 1922–23 | Iroquois Falls Papermakers | NOHA | — | — | — | — | — | — | — | — | — | — |
| 1923–24 | North Bay Trappers | NOHA | 6 | 4 | 0 | 4 | 0 | 5 | 9 | 0 | 9 | 0 |
| 1924–25 | London AAA | OHA Sr | 18 | 14 | 6 | 20 | 24 | — | — | — | — | — |
| 1925–26 | London Ravens | OHA Sr | 19 | 18 | 7 | 25 | 23 | 2 | 4 | 1 | 5 | 0 |
| 1925–26 | London Ravens | Al-Cup | — | — | — | — | — | 2 | 2 | 0 | 2 | 0 |
| 1926–27 | London Panthers | Can-Pro | 30 | 7 | 2 | 9 | 27 | 4 | 5 | 1 | 6 | 15 |
| 1927–28 | Toronto Maple Leafs | NHL | 25 | 6 | 5 | 11 | 29 | — | — | — | — | — |
| 1927–28 | Toronto Falcons | Can-Pro | 19 | 10 | 4 | 14 | 57 | — | — | — | — | — |
| 1928–29 | Toronto Maple Leafs | NHL | 32 | 3 | 11 | 14 | 24 | — | — | — | — | — |
| 1928–29 | Pittsburgh Pirates | NHL | 12 | 2 | 1 | 3 | 6 | — | — | — | — | — |
| 1929–30 | Pittsburgh Pirates | NHL | 44 | 16 | 14 | 30 | 30 | — | — | — | — | — |
| 1930–31 | Philadelphia Quakers | NHL | 43 | 13 | 14 | 27 | 27 | — | — | — | — | — |
| 1931–32 | Chicago Black Hawks | NHL | 48 | 8 | 3 | 11 | 32 | 2 | 1 | 0 | 1 | 2 |
| 1932–33 | St. Paul Greyhounds/Tulsa Oilers | AHA | 14 | 6 | 1 | 7 | 16 | — | — | — | — | — |
| 1932–33 | Ottawa Senators | NHL | 7 | 0 | 0 | 0 | 0 | — | — | — | — | — |
| 1932–33 | Quebec Castors | Can-Am | 26 | 12 | 14 | 26 | 43 | — | — | — | — | — |
| 1933–34 | Quebec Castors | Can-Am | 40 | 11 | 17 | 28 | 30 | — | — | — | — | — |
| 1934–35 | Quebec Castors | Can-Am | 31 | 13 | 10 | 23 | 30 | — | — | — | — | — |
| 1934–35 | Providence Reds | Can-Am | 19 | 7 | 13 | 20 | 19 | 6 | 2 | 2 | 4 | 0 |
| 1935–36 | Providence Reds | Can-Am | 45 | 5 | 14 | 19 | 26 | 7 | 0 | 2 | 2 | 2 |
| 1936–37 | Providence Reds | AHL | 40 | 3 | 16 | 19 | 17 | 3 | 1 | 0 | 1 | 0 |
| 1938–39 | Hull Volants | OCHL | 5 | 2 | 6 | 8 | 2 | 9 | 8 | 4 | 12 | 8 |
| 1938–39 | Hull Volants | Al-Cup | — | — | — | — | — | 9 | 1 | 2 | 3 | 7 |
| 1939–40 | Ottawa Camerons | OCHL | 15 | 13 | 8 | 21 | 12 | — | — | — | — | — |
| 1940–41 | Ottawa Montagnards | OCHL | 18 | 5 | 9 | 14 | 6 | — | — | — | — | — |
| 1941–42 | Ottawa Montagnards | OCHL | 1 | 0 | 0 | 0 | 0 | — | — | — | — | — |
| Can-Am totals | | | 161 | 48 | 68 | 116 | 148 | 13 | 2 | 4 | 6 | 2 |
| NHL totals | | | 211 | 48 | 48 | 96 | 148 | 2 | 1 | 0 | 1 | 2 |
