= Roy Worters =

Canadian ice hockey player (1900–1957)

- Hockey Hall of Fame, 1969
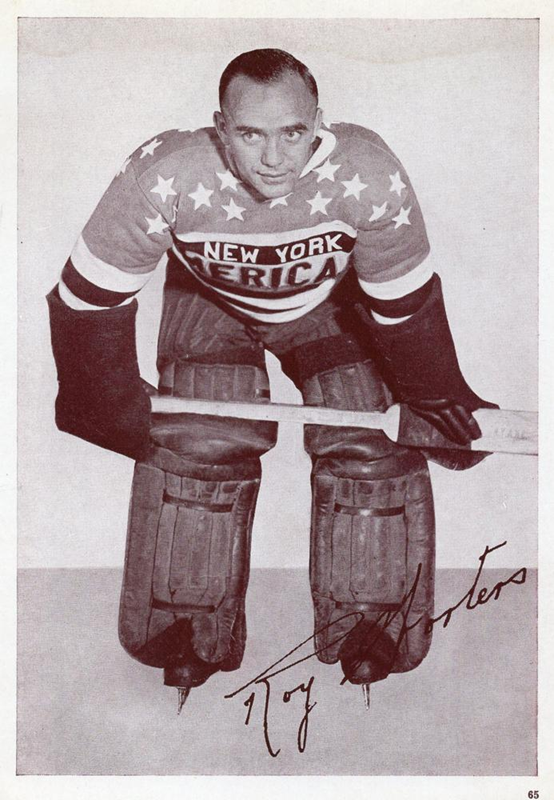
- Born: October 19, 1900 Toronto, Ontario, Canada
- Died: November 7, 1957 (aged 57) Toronto, Ontario, Canada
- Height: 5 ft 3 in (160 cm)
- Weight: 135 lb (61 kg; 9 st 9 lb)
- Position: Goaltender
- Caught: Left
- Played for: New York Americans; Montreal Canadiens; Pittsburgh Pirates
- Playing career: 1925–1937

Roy Thomas "Shrimp" Worters (October 19, 1900 – November 7, 1957) was a Canadian professional Hockey Hall of Fame goaltender who played twelve seasons in the National Hockey League (NHL) for the Pittsburgh Pirates, Montreal Canadiens and New York Americans.

Worters recorded 66 shutouts in his career. At 5 ft 3 in (160 cm) tall, he was the shortest player ever to play in the NHL.

== Playing career ==
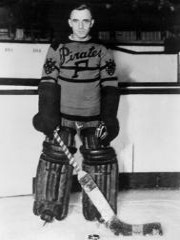
Worters in promotional photo for Pittsburgh Pirates, c. 1925/1928

Worters played junior ice hockey in Toronto with the Toronto Canoe Club Paddlers, winning the 1920 Memorial Cup, the national junior championship. He then spent several years in amateur and senior leagues, including the 1923–24 and 1924–25 seasons as the star netminder for the Pittsburgh Yellow Jackets of the United States Amateur Hockey Association, leading the Yellow Jackets to championships both seasons. Bolstered by the success, the expansion Pittsburgh Pirates joined the NHL the following season, with Worters in goal and substantially the same lineup as the Yellow Jackets. Worters proved an iron man, playing three seasons for the Pirates and in virtually all of their games, showing great skill while backstopping a weak defensive team; in the Pirates' first season, Worters stopped 70 of 73 shots (setting a then-NHL record) in a 3–1 loss to the Americans.

Worters refused to sign with the Pirates for the 1927–28 season, and was suspended briefly before being traded to the Americans, for whom he would spend the rest of his career (save for a single game on loan to the Canadiens in 1930). His first season with the Americans saw Worters becoming the first goaltender to win the Hart Memorial Trophy with a 1.15 goals against average as he led the Americans to second place in the Canadian Division, after the team finished in last place the year before.

During his time with the New York Americans, Worters had a corps of large defencemen in front of him, including Bullet Joe Simpson, "Red" Dutton, and Lionel Conacher. Coincidentally, Conacher grew up in the same Toronto neighbourhood as Worters. The Americans would make the playoffs only once more during Worters' career, although he would win the Vezina Trophy in 1930–31 as the league's best goaltender. During the ensuing contract negotiations following the season, Worters signed for $8,500 per season, an unprecedented sum for a goalie. He became the first goalie in NHL history to record back to back shutouts in his first two games for a new team.

While with the Americans, Worters was named team captain for the 1932–33 season.

In 1937, Worters needed hernia surgery and retired following the season. Roy Worters died of throat cancer on November 7, 1957. He was inducted into the Hockey Hall of Fame in 1969.

== Awards and achievements ==
- Hart Memorial Trophy Winner in 1929
- Selected to the NHL Second All-Star Team in 1932, 1934
- Vezina Trophy Winner in 1931
- First NHL goalie to record back to back shutouts
- Inducted to the Hockey Hall of Fame in 1969

== Career statistics ==
=== Regular season and playoffs ===
			Regular season								Playoffs
Season	Team	League	GP	W	L	T	Min	GA	SO	GAA	GP	W	L	T	Min	GA	SO	GAA
1918–19	Parkdale Canoe Club	OHA-Jr	8	7	1	0	480	22	0	2.75	2	1	1	0	120	6	0	3.00
1919–20	Toronto Canoe Club	OHA-Jr	3	3	0	0	180	14	0	4.67	7	7	0	0	420	25	0	3.57
1919–20	Toronto Canoe Club	M-Cup	—	—	—	—	—	—	—	—	3	3	0	0	180	9	0	3.00
1920–21	Porcupine Gold Miners	GBHL	10	7	2	1	630	27	0	2.57	2	0	2	0	120	10	0	5.00
1921–22	Porcupine Gold Miners	GBHL	—	—	—	—	—	—	—	—	—	—	—	—	—	—	—	—
1922–23	Toronto Argonauts	OHA Sr	—	—	—	—	—	—	—	—	—	—	—	—	—	—	—	—
1923–24	Pittsburgh Yellow Jackets	USAHA	20	15	5	0	1225	25	7	1.23	13	9	3	1	840	12	5	0.86
1924–25	Pittsburgh Yellow Jackets	USAHA	39	25	10	4	1895	34	17	0.81	8	6	1	1	400	8	1	1.20
1925–26	Pittsburgh Pirates	NHL	35	18	16	1	2145	68	7	1.90	2	0	1	1	120	6	0	3.00
1926–27	Pittsburgh Pirates	NHL	44	15	26	3	2711	108	4	2.39	—	—	—	—	—	—	—	—
1927–28	Pittsburgh Pirates	NHL	44	19	17	8	2740	76	10	1.66	2	1	1	0	120	6	0	3.00
1928–29	New York Americans	NHL	38	16	12	10	2390	46	13	1.15	2	0	1	1	150	1	1	0.40
1929–30	New York Americans	NHL	36	11	21	4	2270	135	2	3.57	—	—	—	—	—	—	—	—
1929–30	Montreal Canadiens	NHL	1	1	0	0	60	2	0	2.00	—	—	—	—	—	—	—	—
1930–31	New York Americans	NHL	44	18	16	10	2760	74	8	1.61	—	—	—	—	—	—	—	—
1931–32	New York Americans	NHL	40	12	20	8	2459	110	5	2.68	—	—	—	—	—	—	—	—
1932–33	New York Americans	NHL	47	15	22	10	2970	116	5	2.34	—	—	—	—	—	—	—	—
1932–33	Quebec Castors	Can-Am	1	0	1	0	60	3	0	3.00	—	—	—	—	—	—	—	—
1933–34	New York Americans	NHL	36	12	13	10	2240	75	4	2.01	—	—	—	—	—	—	—	—
1934–35	New York Americans	NHL	48	12	27	9	3000	142	3	2.84	—	—	—	—	—	—	—	—
1935–36	New York Americans	NHL	48	16	25	7	3000	122	3	2.44	5	2	3	0	300	11	2	2.20
1936–37	New York Americans	NHL	23	6	14	3	1430	69	2	2.90	—	—	—	—	—	—	—	—
NHL totals			484	171	229	83	30,175	1143	66	2.27	11	3	6	2	690	24	3	2.09

Awards and achievements
Preceded by Howie Morenz	Winner of the Hart Trophy; 1929	Succeeded by Nels Stewart
Preceded by Cecil Thompson	Winner of the Vezina Trophy; 1931	Succeeded by Charlie Gardiner
