= Argonaut Rowing Club =

Canadian rowing club

Coordinates: 43.632006°N 79.436039°W

Argonaut Rowing Club (ARC)
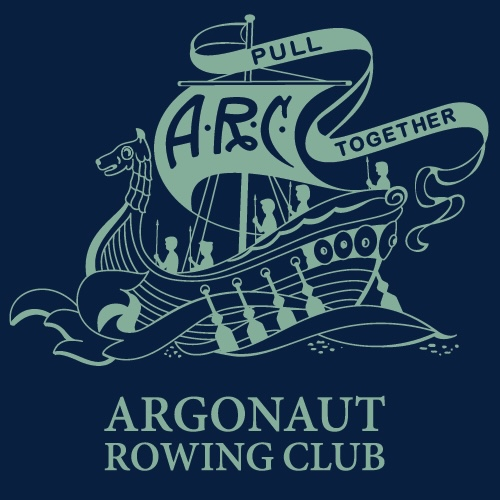
- Boatmen logo and wordmark of the Argonaut Rowing Club
- Formation: 1872
- Legal status: active
- Purpose: advocate and public voice, educator and network for rowing, coaches, volunteers and events
- Location: 1225 Lake Shore Boulevard West, Toronto, Ontario, Canada
- Official language: English, French
- Affiliations: Rowing Canada, ROWONTARIO, Central Ontario Rowing Association, Dominion Day Association,
- Website: argonautrowingclub.com

The Argonaut Rowing Club is an amateur rowing club in Toronto, Ontario, Canada. The club was founded in 1872. The current junior head coach is Connor Elsdon. In the past, the club fielded teams in ice hockey and football, and the football team continues today as the Toronto Argonauts of the Canadian Football League, who are also the oldest professional sports team in North America to still use their original name.

== History ==
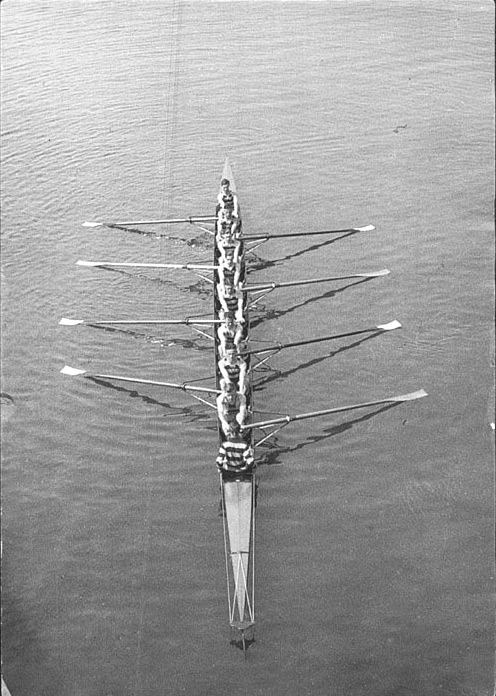
Junior boat in 1925.

The club, one of the oldest and largest of its type in Canada, dates back to 1872, founded by a group of amateur oarsmen known as the Orioles, which had been participating in races in southern Ontario in the 1860s. The founders chose the blue colours of Oxford and Cambridge universities (the "Double Blue") as the club colours. The first president was Henry O'Brien.

The original club house was at the foot of York Street in Toronto Harbour (now filled in and part of the train tracks south of Union Station). It was only large enough for one boat, replaced by a larger clubhouse that was lost by fire in 1879 and rebuilt. The club relocated to the current Dowling Avenue location in 1921 after the harbour location was redeveloped for port usage, purchasing land along the waterfront within the new breakwater protected shoreline. In 1947, a fire gutted the club house at Dowling, and almost destroyed the Grey Cup, which was on display at the club at the time.

Lotte Marks' Argonaut Waltzes (1899) is a musical work dedicated to the Argonaut Rowing Club of Toronto.

Argonaut rowing teams have represented Canada at several Olympics, including 1904, 1908, 1912 and 1952, while Argonaut members represented Canada at other Olympics. Club membership declined in the late 1970s, and by 1979, the Argonauts only had four members represent the club at the Henley Royal Regatta. The club managed to make a recovery in the 1980s to its current state.

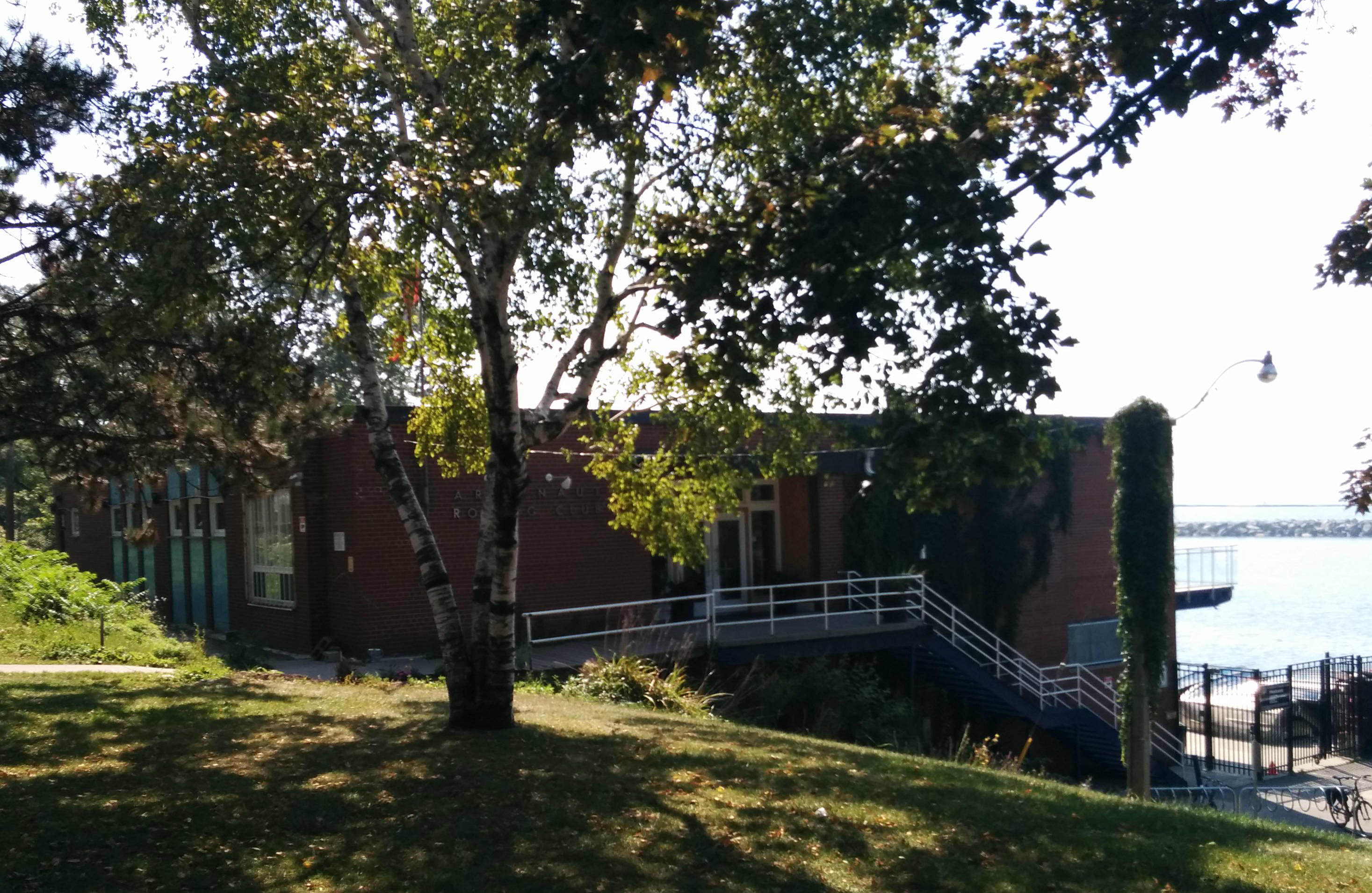
Clubhouse building on shore of Lake Ontario.

== Football ==
Club members also participated in other sports including the football Argonauts, which was founded as the Argonaut Rugby Football Club in 1873. The football team eventually became a professional club (and adopted its team colours from the rowing club, which they still use to this day) and its revenues subsidized the club as a whole. The football team was sold in 1956, and the funds from the sale were used to set up a trust which funds rowing club activities. Two years later, in 1958, the football team joined the Canadian Football League, where it has played since.

== Ice hockey ==
The club also fielded ice hockey teams in the Ontario Hockey Association (OHA) on and off from 1904 to 1923. The Argonauts operated senior ice hockey, intermediate ice hockey and junior ice hockey teams during their time in the OHA. The junior team won the J. Ross Robertson Cup as OHA champions in the 1911–12 season and the 1919–20 season. The junior team also won the national championship at the 1920 Memorial Cup, participating under the name Toronto Canoe Club Paddlers.

The ice hockey team is credited by Frank Selke as the originators of the modern defence pairing. Until 1906, defencemen in ice hockey were known as the point and cover point. The two points lined up one behind the other at face offs. The Argonaut team moved the players to left and right in the positions used today. The setup is considered to be originated from the style of plays of the Argonauts. The team ran set plays reminiscent of football, and moved the players to fit the set plays. The Argonauts were very successful in the first decade of the 1900s and the style caught on in the OHA.

Regular season statistics for the senior team

- 1904–05 – 3rd in Group 3, but out of playoffs
- 1905–06 – 1st in Group 1, but lost in final
- 1906–07 – 4th in Group 1, but out of playoffs
- 1909–10 – 1st in Group 1, but lost in final
- 1910–11 – 1st in Group 1, but lost in final
- 1911–12 – 2nd in Group 1, but out of playoffs
- 1913–14 – 4th in Group 2, but out of playoffs
- 1914–15 – 3rd in Group 2, but out of playoffs
- 1915–16 – tied 1st in Group 2, lost in Group Final
- 1919–20 – 4th in Group 2, but out of playoffs
- 1920–21 – 6th, but out of playoffs
- 1921–22 – 6th, but out of playoffs
- 1922–23 – 4th, but out of playoffs

== Facilities ==
The club uses the 4,000 metre long Ontario Place West Channel water course running along the Western Beaches of Toronto from the west side of Ontario Place to the mouth of the Humber River within the breakwall. The current clubhouse is a two-storey brick building.

== Sources ==
- Selke, Frank (1962). Behind the cheering. Toronto, Ontario, Canada: McClelland and Stewart.
