= Pittsburgh Pirates (NHL) =

Former professional ice hockey team in Pittsburgh, Pennsylvania

- Division: American Division
- Founded: 1925
- History: Pittsburgh Yellow Jackets; 1915–1921 (independent); 1921–1925 (USAHA); Pittsburgh Pirates; 1925–1930; Philadelphia Quakers; 1930–1931
- Home arena: Duquesne Garden
- City: Pittsburgh, Pennsylvania
- Team colors: Black, gold
- Media: Pittsburgh Post-Gazette; Pittsburgh Press; KDKA (AM)
- Stanley Cups: 0
- Conference championships: 0
- Division championships: 0

The Pittsburgh Pirates were a professional ice hockey team in the National Hockey League (NHL), based in Pittsburgh from 1925–26 to 1929–30. The nickname comes from the baseball team also based in the city. For the 1930–31 season, the team moved to Philadelphia, and played one season as the Philadelphia Quakers.

== History ==
=== Early days ===
The Pittsburgh Pirates are traced back to the Pittsburgh Yellow Jackets of the United States Amateur Hockey Association. The Yellow Jackets, under manager Roy Schooley and coach Dick Carroll, won back-to-back USAHA championships in the league's last two seasons, 1923–24 and 1924–25. The players on this team formed the core of a newly professional Pittsburgh club that was granted a franchise by the National Hockey League on November 7, 1925. Pittsburgh's admission to the NHL came after Eddie Livingstone, the former owner of the Toronto Shamrocks and the Toronto Blueshirts of the National Hockey Association saw Pittsburgh as a possible member for a proposed rival league to the NHL; Pittsburgh had, in the 1890s, been the first metropolitan area to professionalize the game of ice hockey. In order to thwart the new league, the President of the NHL, Frank Calder, negotiated to put a franchise in Pittsburgh, which became the seventh team to join the NHL as well as the league's third US-based team. The team took the name Pittsburgh Pirates after receiving permission from Barney Dreyfuss, the owner of the Pittsburgh Pirates baseball team.

The Pirates were assigned to what would later be called the NHL's American Division, with the Boston Bruins and the New York Americans. These two franchises were the only other American teams in the NHL at the time. Duquesne Garden, located in the city's Oakland neighborhood, served as the team's home arena. Duquesne Garden president Henry Townsend was the club's president and owner. The Pirates, dubbed the "Mighty Steel City Sextet" in the Pittsburgh Press, were mostly leftovers from the former Pittsburgh Yellow Jackets. Ten former Yellow Jacket players would play for the Pirates.

=== The inaugural season ===
The Pirates began play during the 1925–26 NHL season. On November 26, 1925, Thanksgiving night, the Pirates defeated the Boston Bruins, 2–1, on the road in their very first NHL game, which was held at Boston Arena. Defenseman and captain Lionel Conacher scored Pittsburgh's first-ever NHL goal. Conacher beat Boston goaltender Charles Stewart at the 17:50 mark of the second period to tie the game at 1–1. Pirates' left winger Harold Darragh notched Pittsburgh's first game-winning goal 9:20 into the third period, while Pittsburgh goaltender Roy Worters stopped 26 of 27 shots to record the first NHL win in franchise and city history.

Two nights later, on November 28, the Pirates stunned the Montreal Canadiens, defeating them 1–0. The 1–0 loss to the Pirates marked the final game for legendary Canadiens' goaltender Georges Vezina. Vezina started the game with severe chest pains and left the game during the first intermission with a high fever. He died four months later from tuberculosis. Meanwhile, the first NHL game ever played in Pittsburgh was on December 2, 1925, in which 8,200 fans paid $1.00 each to see the 8:30 p.m. faceoff at Duquesne Garden. The Pirates lost to the New York Americans in overtime, 2–1. Conacher scored the lone goal for Pittsburgh at 9:15 of the second period.

In 36 games, the Pirates posted an impressive 19–16–1 record for third best in the league. With a .542 winning percentage, that first season would arguably be the team's best. During the playoffs, the Pirates faced the Montreal Maroons in a two-game series to be decided on total goals scored. The Pirates lost the series six goals to four after a 3–1 defeat at Duquesne Garden and a 3–3 tie at Montreal. The Maroons would go on to win the 1926 Stanley Cup Final.

=== 1926–1928 ===
In the next season, the Pirates missed the playoffs after finishing in fourth place. Their third season saw the team post a 19–17–8 record and earn a playoff spot. This playoff series would be based on a two-game total goal series format. In the playoffs, the Pirates were defeated by the New York Rangers, 6–4. The Pirates lost 4–0 in game 1, and won game 2, 4–2, but could not overcome New York's lead in goals. This marked the second time the team lost in the first round to the eventual Stanley Cup winner. It would also turn out to be the last playoff game in the Pirates' history.

=== Decline ===
In October 1928, brothers Horace and Edward Townsend, who had inherited ownership of the club from their late father Henry Townsend, sold the team. The ostensible purchaser was fight promoter and ex-lightweight boxing champion Benny Leonard, although the money for the purchase is suspected to have come from early Prohibition gangster and bootlegger Bill Dwyer, owner of the New York Americans. The sale of the team did not lead to an improvement on the ice for the Pirates. The team's coach, Odie Cleghorn left the team at the end of the 1928–29 season to become a referee. Frank Fredrickson was then named the team's coach. The team's uniforms also changed, as the Pirates' color scheme became blue and gold in 1928–29 and then orange and black in 1929–30.

The 1929–30 season was their fifth season in the NHL, and their last in Pittsburgh. The season saw the Pirates achieve their worst win–loss record with 5–36–3 record. With the Wall Street Crash of 1929, followed by the Great Depression, the owners found themselves in financial difficulties. Attendance for games was down and the owners tried selling off their star players in order to make ends meet. The team was $400,000 in debt by the end of their final season. It also needed a replacement for the Duquesne Garden. It had been built in 1890 and had once been one of the finest arenas in the country. However, it had not aged well, and by the time the Pirates arrived it was at the end of its useful life. With only 5,000 permanent seats and standing room for 8,000, it was by far the smallest arena in the NHL, making it difficult for the Pirates to break even.

=== Relocation ===
On October 18, 1930, at the NHL Board of Governors' meeting, Leonard moved the team across Pennsylvania, to Philadelphia, and renamed them the Philadelphia Quakers. However, Leonard's intention was to return the team to Pittsburgh as soon as a new arena was built. Thirteen players from the Pirates were transferred to the Quakers after the Pittsburgh franchise relocated. These players were Cliff Barton, Harold Darragh, Herb Drury, Gord Frasier, Jim Jarvis, Gerry Lowrey, Rennison Manners, Johnny McKinnon, Hib Milks, Joe Miller, Rodger Smith, and Tex White. Frank Fredrickson was also transferred to the Quakers, but he was released by Philadelphia two days later. The Quakers posted a poor 4–36–4 record in the 1930–31 season. The team then received permission from the NHL on September 26, 1931, to temporally cease operations as they sought a new permanent arena, located in either Pittsburgh or Philadelphia.

Meanwhile, the poor economy was taking a toll on the entire league. The Great Depression devastated the NHL as four teams were forced to fold, leaving behind just six teams. When a new Pittsburgh arena failed to materialize, Leonard surrendered his franchise in 1936. As it turned out, a new arena in Pittsburgh would not be built until the Pittsburgh Civic Arena opened in 1961. The NHL would play with six teams for 25 years before deciding to expand. The expansion in 1967 brought the Pittsburgh Penguins to the NHL and the city of Pittsburgh and the orange and black-uniformed Philadelphia Flyers to Philadelphia.

The last remaining active member of the Pittsburgh Pirates was Cliff Barton, who played his final NHL game in the 1939–40 season, where he won the Stanley Cup as a member of the New York Rangers.

== Historic firsts ==
The Pittsburgh Pirates have left their mark in the NHL record books and NHL history with many firsts and other notable achievements.

- Odie Cleghorn, the Pirates' coach (and occasional player) for the first four seasons, was the first NHL coach to change his players on the fly. This article from the December 21, 1925, Pittsburgh Press describes how Cleghorn would change the forward line halfway through each period with another set of attackers, who would play for "six or eight minutes". The first line would then come back on to finish the period. The defencemen were not changed.
- Cleghorn was also the first coach to use three set forward lines, which was a huge change from the standard, which was to simply leave the best players out for as long as possible.
- The Pirates set an NHL record in salaries by signing defenceman Lionel Conacher to a three-year deal worth $7,500 a year. Conacher was later named Canada's athlete of the half-century.
- On December 26, 1925 the Pirates and the New York Americans combined for what still stands as the NHL record for most shots in one game. The two teams combined for 141 shots in a 3–1 New York win. Roy Worters made 70 saves for the Pirates and Jake Forbes made 67 saves for the Americans.

== Logos and uniforms ==
The Pirates were one of the first teams in Pittsburgh to use the black & gold color scheme, basing their colors around the Flag of Pittsburgh's colors. They were predated in that regard by their own predecessor, the Yellow Jackets, as well as the 1912 Pittsburgh Filipinos and 1924 Pittsburgh Pirates baseball teams. Decades after the team folded, the colors have become the team colors of all three of Pittsburgh's major sports teams. However, during the team's existence, they would be the only team in the city with the colors, as the Pittsburgh Pirates baseball team, like all other baseball teams at the time, had a more patriotic red, white, and blue color scheme and wouldn't permanently adopt black & gold until 1948. Meanwhile, the NFL's Pittsburgh Steelers would not exist until 1933, three years after the team left town and two years after the franchise folded altogether.

The Pirates would later have a connection with Pittsburgh's next NHL franchise; the Pittsburgh Penguins. In January 1980, the Boston Bruins protested to the NHL over the Penguins proposed change in team colors, from blue (in light and dark shades) and white to black and gold (colors present on the Penguins' logo). The Penguins used the Pirates as an example of an NHL team, other than the Bruins, that used the black & gold color scheme; in addition, black and gold was not even the Bruins' original color scheme, as they wore brown and gold (the colors of Bruins founder Charles Adams' First National grocery stores) until 1935. The NHL allowed the Penguins to change their colors as a result of the Pirates using these colors. In the 2023 NHL Winter Classic, the Penguins paid homage to the Pirates with their uniforms for the game, which featured the original "P" logo from the team's first jersey and a similar striping pattern.

The Pirates wore bright yellow wool jerseys with black trim stripes with a "P" on the front of their jerseys during the 1925–1926 season. The team used the Pittsburgh's city crest emblems from older police jackets on the uniform sleeves. The first year jerseys appear to have been inherited from the Pittsburgh Yellow Jackets old jerseys. The Pirates featured new jerseys in 1928–29 that were gold with blue striping. The word "Pirates" written in arched, blocked lettering. The city crest on the sleeves was replaced with a "P".

In 1929–30, the Pirates switched to black and orange uniforms for their fifth and final season. The wool jerseys featured a chain-knit logo of a pirate face with an eye patch and hat with skull and cross bones. The jersey featured double striping on the sleeves and a diagonal background behind the crest. The orange and black remained when the Pirates moved across the state to become the Quakers, Philadelphia's first NHL team, adopting script lettering like the original Pirates' uniforms. When the Philadelphia Flyers joined the NHL in 1967, they adopted the orange and black colors first worn by the Pirates and Quakers.

== Personnel ==
=== Owners ===
- Henry Townsend (1925–1927)
- Horace Townsend, Edward Townsend (1927–1928)
- Benny Leonard (nominal owner), Bill Dwyer (alleged covert owner) (1928–1930)

=== Head coaches ===
- Odie Cleghorn (1925–1929)
- Frank Fredrickson (1929–1930)

=== Captains ===
- Lionel Conacher (1925–1926)
- Harold Cotton (1926–1929)
- Gerry Lowrey (1929–1930)

=== Hall of Famers ===
- Lionel Conacher
- Frank Fredrickson
- Mickey MacKay
- Roy Worters

=== Olympic winners ===
1920 Olympics in Antwerp, Belgium:

- Frank Frederickson won a gold medal with the Canadian national hockey team
- Herb Drury won a silver medal with the American national hockey team

1924 Olympics in Chamonix, France:

- Bert McCaffrey won a gold medal with the Canadian national hockey team
- Herb Drury won a silver medal with the American national hockey team

== Season-by-season record ==
Note: GP = Games played, W = Wins, L = Losses, T = Ties, Pts = Points, GF = Goals for, GA = Goals against, PIM = Penalties in minutes

| Season | Team season | GP | W | L | T | Pts | GF | GA | PIM | Finish | Playoffs |
|---|---|---|---|---|---|---|---|---|---|---|---|
| 1925–26 | 1925–26 | 36 | 19 | 16 | 1 | 39 | 82 | 70 | 264 | 3rd in NHL | Lost semifinals (Maroons) 6–4 |
| 1926–27 | 1926–27 | 44 | 15 | 26 | 3 | 33 | 79 | 108 | 230 | 4th in American | Did not qualify |
| 1927–28 | 1927–28 | 44 | 19 | 17 | 8 | 46 | 67 | 76 | 395 | 3rd in American | Lost semifinals (Rangers) 6–4 |
| 1928–29 | 1928–29 | 44 | 9 | 27 | 8 | 26 | 46 | 80 | 324 | 4th in American | Did not qualify |
| 1929–30 | 1929–30 | 44 | 5 | 36 | 3 | 13 | 102 | 185 | 384 | 5th in American | Did not qualify |
Relocated to Philadelphia
| Total | | 212 | 67 | 122 | 23 | 157 | 376 | 519 | 1,597 | | 2 playoffs appearances |

== See also ==
- Philadelphia Quakers
- List of Pittsburgh Pirates (NHL) players
- Head Coaches of the Pittsburgh Pirates (NHL)
- List of defunct NHL teams
