= 1928–29 NHL season =

Professional ice hockey league season

- League: National Hockey League
- Sport: Ice hockey
- Duration: November 15, 1928 – March 29, 1929
- Games: 44
- Teams: 10

Regular season
- Season champions: Montreal Canadiens
- Season MVP: Roy Worters (Americans)
- Top scorer: Ace Bailey (Maple Leafs)
- Canadian Division champions: Montreal Canadiens
- American Division champions: Boston Bruins

Stanley Cup
- Champions: Boston Bruins
- Runners-up: New York Rangers

NHL seasons
- ← 1927–28 1929–30 →

The 1928–29 NHL season was the 12th season of the National Hockey League. Ten teams played 44 games each. This was the first Stanley Cup Final that saw two United States–based teams compete for the cup. The Boston Bruins defeated the New York Rangers two games to none in the best-of-three final.

== League business ==
=== Notable rule changes ===
Forward passing was permitted from the neutral zone across the blue line into the attacking zone, as long as no offensive player preceded the puck into the attacking zone; forward passing within the attacking zone was still forbidden. Regular season overtime was changed to a 10-minute, non-sudden-death format, to be played in its entirety.

During this season, the NHL office started tabulating defensive statistics, such as shots stopped, saves made and save percentage.

The league was determined to increase scoring. In the final game of the season between the Rangers and Pittsburgh, forward passing in the attacking zone was allowed; kicking of the puck was allowed; and goalies were prohibited from holding the puck more than three seconds. The experiment was considered a success, and the changes were a part of the rules for the 1928–29 season.

== Arena changes ==
- The Boston Bruins moved from Boston Arena to Boston Madison Square Garden.
- Due to the new Chicago Stadium, the new home of the Chicago Black Hawks, still under construction, the team played games at Chicago Coliseum through January, then played the rest of their "home" games in February and March at either Detroit Olympia in Detroit (sharing it with the Detroit Cougars) or Peace Bridge Arena in Fort Erie, Ontario.

== Regular season ==
Ottawa continued in financial trouble and sold Punch Broadbent to the New York Americans. They continued to erode, and at one point, rumour had it that they would be sold to a Chicago group. Frank Ahearn, the Senators owner, denied this, but admitted that the team was for sale to the highest bidder.

The New York Americans, last place finishers in 1927–28, surprised everyone by occupying first place for much of the season in the Canadian Division. They were held up by the great play of defenceman Lionel Conacher and goaltender Roy Worters. However, the Montreal Canadiens dislodged the Americans and finished first. Boston, led by rookie Tiny Thompson in goal, led the American Division.

Bruins' player George Owen was the first NHL player to regularly wear headgear for protective purposes. Prior to this, the only time protective headgear was worn was to temporarily protect injuries. Fifty-one years later the NHL mandated the use of helmets. Craig MacTavish was the last NHL player to not wear a helmet, retiring in 1997.

The Chicago Black Hawks set records for goal scoring futility, scoring on average less than one goal per game (33), while giving up a league worst 85 goals against. In one stretch from February 7 through February 28, the Hawks were shut out in eight consecutive games. Forward Vic Ripley was the Hawks' leading goal scorer with only 11 goals and 2 assists for 13 points for the entire 44-game season.

The season produced a record 120 shutouts in the 220 games played. George Hainsworth, Canadiens goaltender, set an NHL record that remains unmatched through the 2015–16 season of 22 shutouts and a 0.92 goals against average. Seven other goaltenders hit double digits in shutouts.

=== Final standings ===
Canadian Division
	GP	W	L	T	GF	GA	PIM	Pts
**Montreal Canadiens**	44	22	7	15	71	43	465	59
**New York Americans**	44	19	13	12	53	53	486	50
**Toronto Maple Leafs**	44	21	18	5	85	69	541	47
Ottawa Senators	44	14	17	13	54	67	461	41
Montreal Maroons	44	15	20	9	67	65	638	39

American Division
	GP	W	L	T	GF	GA	PIM	Pts
**Boston Bruins**	44	26	13	5	89	52	472	57
**New York Rangers**	44	21	13	10	72	65	384	52
**Detroit Cougars**	44	19	16	9	72	63	381	47
Pittsburgh Pirates	44	9	27	8	46	80	324	26
Chicago Black Hawks	44	7	29	8	33	85	363	22

Note: W = Wins, L = Losses, T = Ties, Pts = Points, GF = Goals For, GA = Goals Against, PIM = Penalties in minutes

Note: Teams that qualified for the playoffs are highlighted in bold

== Playoffs ==
=== Playoff bracket ===
A new playoff format was adopted with a structure similar to a double-elimination tournament with a "winners' bracket" and a "losers' or repechage bracket". The top three teams in each division qualified for the playoffs. The two division winners met in a best-of-five Stanley Cup semifinal series. The divisional second-place teams and third-place teams played off in a two-game total-goals series to determine the participants for the other best-of-three semifinal series. The semifinal winners then played in a best-of-three Stanley Cup Final.

First round
C2	NY Americans	0G
A2	NY Rangers	1G
C3	Toronto	7G
A3	Detroit	2G

Semifinals
C1	Mtl Canadiens	0
A1	Boston	3
A2	NY Rangers	2
C3	Toronto	0

Final
A1	Boston	2
A2	NY Rangers	0

=== Quarterfinals ===
==== (A2) New York Rangers vs. (C2) New York Americans ====
March 19	New York Rangers	0–0	New York Americans	Madison Square Garden III	Recap
No scoring		First period	No scoring
No scoring		Second period	No scoring
No scoring		Third period	No scoring
John Ross Roach		Goalie stats	Roy Worters

March 21	New York Americans	0–1	2OT	New York Rangers	Madison Square Garden III	Recap
No scoring		First period		No scoring
No scoring		Second period		No scoring
No scoring		Third period		No scoring
No scoring		Second overtime period		19:50 – Butch Keeling (1)
Roy Worters		Goalie stats		John Ross Roach

New York Rangers won series on total goals 1–0

==== (C3) Toronto Maple Leafs vs. (A3) Detroit Cougars ====
March 19	Toronto Maple Leafs	3–1	Detroit Cougars	Olympia Stadium	Recap
Andy Blair (1) – 01:35; Art Smith (1) – 18:35		First period	No scoring
No scoring		Second period	16:35 – George Hay (1)
Andy Blair (2) – 18:07		Third period	No scoring
Lorne Chabot		Goalie stats	Dolly Dolson

March 21	Detroit Cougars	1–4	Toronto Maple Leafs	Arena Gardens	Recap
No scoring		First period	06:45 – Hap Day (1); 08:30 – Eric Pettinger (1)
No scoring		Second period	18:00 – Red Horner (1)
Larry Aurie (1) – 18:50		Third period	19:59 – Ace Bailey (1)
Dolly Dolson		Goalie stats	Lorne Chabot

Toronto won the series on total goals 7–2

=== Semifinals ===
==== (C1) Montreal Canadiens vs. (A1) Boston Bruins ====
March 19	Montreal Canadiens	0–1	Boston Bruins	Boston Madison Square Garden	Recap
No scoring		First period	04:00 – Cooney Weiland (1)
No scoring		Second period	No scoring
No scoring		Third period	No scoring
George Hainsworth		Goalie stats	Tiny Thompson

March 21	Montreal Canadiens	0–1	Boston Bruins	Boston Madison Square Garden	Recap
No scoring		First period	06:13 – Cooney Weiland (2)
No scoring		Second period	No scoring
No scoring		Third period	No scoring
George Hainsworth		Goalie stats	Tiny Thompson

March 23	Boston Bruins	3–2	Montreal Canadiens	Forum de Montréal	Recap
No scoring		First period	09:27 – Albert Leduc (1); 09:36 – Aurele Joliat (1)
Bill Carson (1) – 09:36; Dutch Gainor (1) – 13:58; Eddie Shore (1) – 14:49		Second period	No scoring
No scoring		Third period	No scoring
Tiny Thompson		Goalie stats	George Hainsworth

Boston won series 3–0

==== (A2) New York Rangers vs. (C3) Toronto Maple Leafs ====
March 24	Toronto Maple Leafs	0–1	New York Rangers	Madison Square Garden III	Recap
No scoring		First period	07:33 – Butch Keeling (2)
No scoring		Second period	No scoring
No scoring		Third period	No scoring
Lorne Chabot		Goalie stats	John Ross Roach

March 26	New York Rangers	2–1	OT	Toronto Maple Leafs	Arena Gardens	Recap
Bun Cook (1) – 04:35		First period		03:05 – Andy Blair (3)
No scoring		Second period		No scoring
No scoring		Third period		No scoring
Frank Boucher (1) – 02:05		First overtime period		No scoring
John Ross Roach		Goalie stats		Lorne Chabot

New York won series 2–0

=== Stanley Cup Finals ===
The Bruins won their first Stanley Cup defeating the Rangers. In the process, Boston became one of the few Cup winners in history to not lose a game in the playoffs, and were the last team until the 1951–52 Detroit Red Wings to go undefeated in the NHL playoffs.

March 28	New York Rangers	0–2	Boston Bruins	Boston Madison Square Garden	Recap
No scoring		First period	No scoring
No scoring		Second period	02:00 – Dit Clapper (1); 10:00 – Dutch Gainor (2)
No scoring		Third period	No scoring
John Ross Roach		Goalie stats	Tiny Thompson

March 29	Boston Bruins	2–1	New York Rangers	Madison Square Garden III	Recap
No scoring		First period	No scoring
Harry Oliver (1) – 14:01		Second period	No scoring
Bill Carson (2) – 18:02		Third period	06:48 – Butch Keeling (3)
Tiny Thompson		Goalie stats	John Ross Roach

Boston won series 2–0

== Awards ==
Frank Boucher won his second consecutive Lady Byng award and George Hainsworth won his third consecutive Vezina Trophy.

1928–29 NHL awards
O'Brien Cup: (Canadian Division champion)	Montreal Canadiens
Prince of Wales Trophy: (American Division champion)	Boston Bruins
Hart Trophy: (Most valuable player)	Roy Worters, New York Americans
Lady Byng Trophy: (Excellence and sportsmanship)	Frank Boucher, New York Rangers
Vezina Trophy: (Fewest goals allowed)	George Hainsworth, Montreal Canadiens

== Player statistics ==
=== Scoring leaders ===
Note: GP = Games played, G = Goals, A = Assists, PTS = Points, PIM = Penalties in minutes

PLAYER	TEAM	GP	G	A	PTS	PIM
Ace Bailey	Toronto Maple Leafs	44	22	10	32	78
Nels Stewart	Montreal Maroons	44	21	8	29	74
Carson Cooper	Detroit Cougars	43	18	9	27	14
Howie Morenz	Montreal Canadiens	42	17	10	27	47
Andy Blair	Toronto Maple Leafs	44	12	15	27	41
Frank Boucher	New York Rangers	44	10	16	26	8
Harry Oliver	Boston Bruins	43	17	6	23	24
Bill Cook	New York Rangers	43	15	8	23	41
Jimmy Ward	Montreal Maroons	44	14	8	22	46
Frank Finnigan	Ottawa Senators	44	15	4	19	71

Source: NHL.

=== Leading goaltenders ===
Note: GP = Games played; Mins = Minutes played; GA = Goals against; SO = Shutouts; GAA = Goals against average

Player	Team	GP	W	L	T	Mins	GA	SO	GAA
George Hainsworth	Montreal Canadiens	44	22	7	15	2800	43	22	0.92
Tiny Thompson	Boston Bruins	44	26	13	5	2710	52	12	1.15
Roy Worters	New York Americans	44	16	12	10	2390	46	13	1.15
Dolly Dolson	Detroit Cougars	38	19	16	9	2750	63	10	1.37
John Ross Roach	New York Rangers	44	21	13	10	2760	65	13	1.41

Source: hockey-reference.com

== Coaches ==
=== American Division ===
- Boston Bruins: Art Ross
- Chicago Black Hawks: Herb Gardiner and Dick Irvin
- Detroit Cougars: Jack Adams
- New York Rangers: Lester Patrick
- Pittsburgh Pirates: Odie Cleghorn

=== Canadian Division ===
- Montreal Canadiens: Cecil Hart
- Montreal Maroons: Eddie Gerard
- New York Americans: Tommy Gorman
- Ottawa Senators: Dave Gill
- Toronto Maple Leafs: Conn Smythe

== Debuts ==
The following is a list of players of note who played their first NHL game in 1928–29 (listed with their first team, asterisk(*) marks debut in playoffs):

- Tiny Thompson, Boston Bruins
- Cooney Weiland, Boston Bruins
- George Owen, Boston Bruins
- Johnny Gottselig, Chicago Black Hawks
- Mush March, Chicago Black Hawks
- Herbie Lewis, Detroit Cougars
- Georges Mantha, Montreal Canadiens
- Armand Mondou, Montreal Canadiens
- Baldy Northcott, Montreal Maroons
- Dave Trottier, Montreal Maroons
- Earl Robinson, Montreal Maroons
- Red Horner, Toronto Maple Leafs
- Andy Blair, Toronto Maple Leafs

== Last games ==
The following is a list of players of note that played their last game in the NHL in 1928–29 (listed with their last team):

- Cy Denneny, Boston Bruins
- Duke Keats, Chicago Black Hawks
- Dick Irvin, Chicago Black Hawks
- Red Green, Detroit Cougars
- Herb Gardiner, Montreal Canadiens
- Punch Broadbent, New York Americans

== See also ==
- 1928–29 NHL transactions
- List of Stanley Cup champions
- 1928 in sports
- 1929 in sports
