= 1929–30 Montreal Maroons season =

National Hockey League team season

1929–30 Montreal Maroons
- Division: 1st Canadian
- 1929–30 record: 23–16–5
- Home record: 10–9–3
- Road record: 13–7–2
- Goals for: 141
- Goals against: 114

Team information
- Coach: Dunc Munro
- Captain: Nels Stewart
- Arena: Montreal Forum

Team leaders
- Goals: Nels Stewart (39)
- Assists: Babe Siebert (19)
- Points: Nels Stewart (55)
- Penalty minutes: Red Dutton (102)
- Wins: Flat Walsh (17)
- Goals against average: Flat Walsh (2.38)

The 1929–30 Montreal Maroons season was the sixth season for the National Hockey League (NHL) franchise.

== Regular season ==
=== Final standings ===
Canadian Division
	GP	W	L	T	GF	GA	PTS
**Montreal Maroons**	44	23	16	5	141	114	**51**
**Montreal Canadiens**	44	21	14	9	142	114	**51**
**Ottawa Senators**	44	21	15	8	138	118	**50**
Toronto Maple Leafs	44	17	21	6	116	124	**40**
New York Americans	44	14	25	5	113	161	**33**

Note: W = Wins, L = Losses, T = Ties, GF = Goals For, GA = Goals Against, Pts = Points
Teams that qualified for the playoffs are highlighted in bold.

=== Record vs. opponents ===
==== Vs. Canadian Division ====
1929–30 NHL records
Team	**MTL**	**MTM**	**NYA**	**OTT**	**TOR**	**Total**
M. Canadiens	—	1–4–1	5–1	1–2–3	4–1–1	**11–8–5**
M. Maroons	4–1–1	—	5–0–1	2–3–1	3–2–1	**14–6–4**
N.Y. Americans	1–5	0–5–1	—	2–3–1	1–3–2	**4–16–4**
Ottawa	2–1–3	3–2–1	3–2–1	—	5–1	**13–6–5**
Toronto	1–4–1	2–3–1	3–1–2	1–5	—	**7–13–4**

==== Vs. American Division ====
1929–30 NHL records
Team	**BOS**	**CHI**	**DET**	**NYR**	**PIT**	**Total**
M. Canadiens	0–4	3–0–1	3–1	2–1–1	2–0–2	**10–6–4**
M. Maroons	1–3	0–4	2–1–1	2–2	4–0	**9–10–1**
N.Y. Americans	1–3	2–2	3–1	2–2	2–1–1	**10–9–1**
Ottawa	0–4	2–2	3–0–1	0–2–2	3–1	**8–9–3**
Toronto	0–4	2–1–1	2–2	3–0–1	3–1	**10–8–2**

== Schedule and results ==
1929–30 regular season
November

Game	Result	Date	Score	Opponent	Record
1	L	November 14, 1929	1–2	New York Rangers (1929–30)	0–1–0
2	W	November 16, 1929	5–2	@ Pittsburgh Pirates (1929–30)	1–1–0
3	W	November 19, 1929	5–1	Montreal Canadiens (1929–30)	2–1–0
4	L	November 21, 1929	1–2	@ New York Rangers (1929–30)	2–2–0
5	L	November 23, 1929	3–4	Boston Bruins (1929–30)	2–3–0
6	W	November 26, 1929	6–1	@ Boston Bruins (1929–30)	3–3–0
7	L	November 28, 1929	6–7	Detroit Cougars (1929–30)	3–4–0
8	W	November 30, 1929	3–2	@ Ottawa Senators (1929–30)	4–4–0

December

Game	Result	Date	Score	Opponent	Record
9	W	December 3, 1929	2–1	Pittsburgh Pirates (1929–30)	5–4–0
10	W	December 5, 1929	5–4	@ Montreal Canadiens (1929–30)	6–4–0
11	T	December 7, 1929	3–3 OT	Ottawa Senators (1929–30)	6–4–1
12	L	December 12, 1929	3–4	@ Chicago Black Hawks (1929–30)	6–5–1
13	W	December 17, 1929	3–1	Toronto Maple Leafs (1929–30)	7–5–1
14	W	December 19, 1929	5–3	@ New York Americans (1929–30)	8–5–1
15	W	December 21, 1929	5–3	New York Americans (1929–30)	9–5–1
16	L	December 26, 1929	3–4	Chicago Black Hawks (1929–30)	9–6–1
17	W	December 29, 1929	6–2	@ Detroit Cougars (1929–30)	10–6–1

January

Game	Result	Date	Score	Opponent	Record
18	L	January 1, 1930	3–5	@ Toronto Maple Leafs (1929–30)	10–7–1
19	L	January 4, 1930	2–4	Boston Bruins (1929–30)	10–8–1
20	W	January 7, 1930	2–1	@ Montreal Canadiens (1929–30)	11–8–1
21	W	January 9, 1930	5–4	@ New York Rangers (1929–30)	12–8–1
22	T	January 14, 1930	1–1 OT	Toronto Maple Leafs (1929–30)	12–8–2
23	W	January 16, 1930	3–2 OT	@ New York Americans (1929–30)	13–8–2
24	W	January 18, 1930	2–1	Ottawa Senators (1929–30)	14–8–2
25	T	January 23, 1930	2–2 OT	Detroit Cougars (1929–30)	14–8–3
26	L	January 25, 1930	0–4	@ Ottawa Senators (1929–30)	14–9–3
27	L	January 28, 1930	2–3	Montreal Canadiens (1929–30)	14–10–3
28	W	January 30, 1930	3–0	@ Toronto Maple Leafs (1929–30)	15–10–3

February

Game	Result	Date	Score	Opponent	Record
29	W	February 1, 1930	7–2	New York Americans (1929–30)	16–10–3
30	L	February 6, 1930	2–3	@ Chicago Black Hawks (1929–30)	16–11–3
31	T	February 8, 1930	2–2 OT	@ Montreal Canadiens (1929–30)	16–11–4
32	W	February 11, 1930	5–2	New York Rangers (1929–30)	17–11–4
33	W	February 13, 1930	6–3	@ Detroit Cougars (1929–30)	18–11–4
34	W	February 15, 1930	3–1	Pittsburgh Pirates (1929–30)	19–11–4
35	L	February 18, 1930	2–3	@ Boston Bruins (1929–30)	19–12–4
36	T	February 20, 1930	3–3 OT	@ New York Americans (1929–30)	19–12–5
37	W	February 22, 1930	5–4	@ Pittsburgh Pirates (1929–30)	20–12–5
38	L	February 25, 1930	0–2	Chicago Black Hawks (1929–30)	20–13–5

March

Game	Result	Date	Score	Opponent	Record
39	W	March 1, 1930	5–1	New York Americans (1929–30)	21–13–5
40	L	March 4, 1930	2–6	@ Ottawa Senators (1929–30)	21–14–5
41	W	March 6, 1930	4–0	Montreal Canadiens (1929–30)	22–14–5
42	W	March 8, 1930	3–2	@ Toronto Maple Leafs (1929–30)	23–14–5
43	L	March 11, 1930	2–4	Ottawa Senators (1929–30)	23–15–5
44	L	March 15, 1930	0–3	Toronto Maple Leafs (1929–30)	23–16–5

Legend: Win (2 points) Loss (0 points) Tie (1 point)

== Playoffs ==
They made it into the playoffs and went against Boston in a best of five series and lost in 4 games, or 1–3.

== Player statistics ==
=== Regular season ===
Scoring

Player	Pos	GP	G	A	Pts	PIM
Nels Stewart	C	44	39	16	55	81
Babe Siebert	LW/D	39	14	19	33	94
Hooley Smith	C/RW	42	21	9	30	83
Dave Trottier	LW	41	17	10	27	73
Merlyn Phillips	C	44	13	10	23	48
Jimmy Ward	RW	44	10	7	17	54
Red Dutton	D	43	3	13	16	98
Baldy Northcott	D/LW	43	10	1	11	6
Dunc Munro	D	40	7	2	9	10
Archie Wilcox	RW/D	42	3	5	8	38
Georges Boucher	D	37	2	6	8	50
Earl Robinson	RW/C	31	1	2	3	10
Bill Phillips	C	27	1	1	2	6
Clint Benedict	G	14	0	0	0	0
Abbie Cox	G	1	0	0	0	0
Chuck Dinsmore	C	9	0	0	0	0
Flat Walsh	G	30	0	0	0	0

Goaltending

Player	MIN	GP	W	L	T	GA	GAA	SO
Flat Walsh	1897	30	16	10	4	74	2.34	2
Clint Benedict	752	14	6	6	1	38	3.03	0
Abbie Cox	60	1	1	0	0	2	2.00	0
Team:	2709	44	23	16	5	114	2.52	2

=== Playoffs ===
Scoring

Player	Pos	GP	G	A	Pts	PIM
Dunc Munro	D	4	2	0	2	4
Hooley Smith	C/RW	4	1	1	2	14
Nels Stewart	C	4	1	1	2	2
Dave Trottier	LW	4	0	2	2	8
Archie Wilcox	RW/D	4	1	0	1	2
Jimmy Ward	RW	4	0	1	1	12
Georges Boucher	D	3	0	0	0	2
Chuck Dinsmore	C	4	0	0	0	0
Red Dutton	D	4	0	0	0	2
Baldy Northcott	D/LW	4	0	0	0	4
Bill Phillips	C	4	0	0	0	2
Merlyn Phillips	C	4	0	0	0	2
Earl Robinson	RW/C	4	0	0	0	0
Babe Siebert	LW/D	3	0	0	0	0
Flat Walsh	G	4	0	0	0	0

Goaltending

Player	MIN	GP	W	L	GA	GAA	SO
Flat Walsh	312	4	1	3	11	2.12	1
Team:	312	4	1	3	11	2.12	1

Note: GP = Games played; G = Goals; A = Assists; Pts = Points; +/- = Plus/minus; PIM = Penalty minutes; PPG = Power-play goals; SHG = Short-handed goals; GWG = Game-winning goals
MIN = Minutes played; W = Wins; L = Losses; T = Ties; GA = Goals against; GAA = Goals against average; SO = Shutouts;

== See also ==
- 1929–30 NHL season
