= 1929–30 Montreal Canadiens season =

NHL hockey team season

1929–30 Montreal Canadiens
- Stanley Cup champions
- Division: 2nd Canadian
- 1929–30 record: 21–14–9
- Home record: 13–5–4
- Road record: 8–9–5
- Goals for: 142
- Goals against: 114

Team information
- General manager: Leo Dandurand
- Coach: Cecil Hart
- Captain: Sylvio Mantha
- Arena: Montreal Forum

Team leaders
- Goals: Howie Morenz (40)
- Assists: Aurele Joliat; Howie Morenz (13)
- Points: Howie Morenz (53)
- Penalty minutes: Sylvio Mantha (108)
- Wins: George Hainsworth (20)
- Goals against average: George Hainsworth (2.42)

The 1929–30 Montreal Canadiens season was the team's 21st season. The team placed second in the Canadian Division and qualified for the playoffs. The team won three series to win the Stanley Cup, for the third time in team history, and the second time in the National Hockey League (NHL).

== Regular season ==
To combat low scoring, a major rule change was implemented. Players were now allowed forward passing in the offensive zone, instead of only in the defensive and neutral zones. This led to abuse: players sat in front of the opposing net waiting for a pass. The rule was changed again mid-season in December 1929, and players were no longer allowed to enter the offensive zone before the puck. Hence the birth of the modern-day offside rule. The Canadiens doubled their scoring output compared to the previous season.

=== Highlights ===
On December 14, 1929, Alfred Lepine scored four goals and added one assist in the second period of a game versus Ottawa, won 6–4 by Montreal. As of 2009, this feat is still the Canadiens' record for goals and points in one period.

=== Final standings ===
Canadian Division
	GP	W	L	T	GF	GA	PTS
**Montreal Maroons**	44	23	16	5	141	114	**51**
**Montreal Canadiens**	44	21	14	9	142	114	**51**
**Ottawa Senators**	44	21	15	8	138	118	**50**
Toronto Maple Leafs	44	17	21	6	116	124	**40**
New York Americans	44	14	25	5	113	161	**33**

Note: W = Wins, L = Losses, T = Ties, GF = Goals For, GA = Goals Against, Pts = Points
Teams that qualified for the playoffs are highlighted in bold.

=== Record vs. opponents ===
==== Vs. Canadian Division ====
1929–30 NHL records
Team	**MTL**	**MTM**	**NYA**	**OTT**	**TOR**	**Total**
M. Canadiens	—	1–4–1	5–1	1–2–3	4–1–1	**11–8–5**
M. Maroons	4–1–1	—	5–0–1	2–3–1	3–2–1	**14–6–4**
N.Y. Americans	1–5	0–5–1	—	2–3–1	1–3–2	**4–16–4**
Ottawa	2–1–3	3–2–1	3–2–1	—	5–1	**13–6–5**
Toronto	1–4–1	2–3–1	3–1–2	1–5	—	**7–13–4**

==== Vs. American Division ====
1929–30 NHL records
Team	**BOS**	**CHI**	**DET**	**NYR**	**PIT**	**Total**
M. Canadiens	0–4	3–0–1	3–1	2–1–1	2–0–2	**10–6–4**
M. Maroons	1–3	0–4	2–1–1	2–2	4–0	**9–10–1**
N.Y. Americans	1–3	2–2	3–1	2–2	2–1–1	**10–9–1**
Ottawa	0–4	2–2	3–0–1	0–2–2	3–1	**8–9–3**
Toronto	0–4	2–1–1	2–2	3–0–1	3–1	**10–8–2**

== Schedule and results ==
1929–30 regular season
November

Game	Result	Date	Score	Opponent	Record
1	T	November 14, 1929	3–3 OT	@ Ottawa Senators (1929–30)	0–0–1
2	T	November 16, 1929	4–4 OT	Chicago Black Hawks (1929–30)	0–0–2
3	L	November 19, 1929	1–5	@ Montreal Maroons (1929–30)	0–1–2
4	W	November 21, 1929	3–2 OT	Toronto Maple Leafs (1929–30)	1–1–2
5	W	November 24, 1929	3–2 OT	@ New York Americans (1929–30)	2–1–2
6	W	November 26, 1929	9–2	Pittsburgh Pirates (1929–30)	3–1–2
7	W	November 30, 1929	3–1	New York Americans (1929–30)	4–1–2

December

Game	Result	Date	Score	Opponent	Record
8	L	December 3, 1929	1–3	@ Boston Bruins (1929–30)	4–2–2
9	L	December 5, 1929	4–5	Montreal Maroons (1929–30)	4–3–2
10	W	December 7, 1929	1–0	@ Toronto Maple Leafs (1929–30)	5–3–2
11	W	December 10, 1929	5–3 OT	Detroit Cougars (1929–30)	6–3–2
12	L	December 12, 1929	3–8	@ New York Rangers (1929–30)	6–4–2
13	W	December 14, 1929	6–4	Ottawa Senators (1929–30)	7–4–2
14	T	December 17, 1929	3–3 OT	@ Pittsburgh Pirates (1929–30)	7–4–3
15	W	December 19, 1929	7–2	New York Rangers (1929–30)	8–4–3
16	T	December 21, 1929	1–1 OT	@ Ottawa Senators (1929–30)	8–4–4
17	L	December 28, 1929	2–3	Boston Bruins (1929–30)	8–5–4

January

Game	Result	Date	Score	Opponent	Record
18	W	January 1, 1930	3–2 OT	@ Chicago Black Hawks (1929–30)	9–5–4
19	L	January 2, 1930	0–4	@ Detroit Cougars (1929–30)	9–6–4
20	L	January 4, 1930	3–4	@ Toronto Maple Leafs (1929–30)	9–7–4
21	L	January 7, 1930	1–2	Montreal Maroons (1929–30)	9–8–4
22	L	January 11, 1930	1–2 OT	Ottawa Senators (1929–30)	9–9–4
23	W	January 16, 1930	6–1	Detroit Cougars (1929–30)	10–9–4
24	W	January 21, 1930	5–2	@ New York Americans (1929–30)	11–9–4
25	L	January 25, 1930	1–2	Boston Bruins (1929–30)	11–10–4
26	W	January 28, 1930	3–2	@ Montreal Maroons (1929–30)	12–10–4
27	W	January 30, 1930	1–0 OT	Chicago Black Hawks (1929–30)	13–10–4

February

Game	Result	Date	Score	Opponent	Record
28	L	February 1, 1930	1–4	@ Ottawa Senators (1929–30)	13–11–4
29	W	February 4, 1930	3–1	Toronto Maple Leafs (1929–30)	14–11–4
30	T	February 6, 1930	3–3 OT	@ Toronto Maple Leafs (1929–30)	14–11–5
31	T	February 8, 1930	2–2 OT	Montreal Maroons (1929–30)	14–11–6
32	T	February 13, 1930	4–4 OT	Ottawa Senators (1929–30)	14–11–7
33	W	February 16, 1930	2–1 OT	@ Chicago Black Hawks (1929–30)	15–11–7
34	W	February 18, 1930	2–0	@ Detroit Cougars (1929–30)	16–11–7
35	W	February 22, 1930	9–2	New York Americans (1929–30)	17–11–7
36	L	February 25, 1930	2–4	@ New York Americans (1929–30)	17–12–7
37	W	February 27, 1930	6–2	Toronto Maple Leafs (1929–30)	18–12–7

March

Game	Result	Date	Score	Opponent	Record
38	W	March 1, 1930	4–2	@ Pittsburgh Pirates (1929–30)	19–12–7
39	L	March 4, 1930	2–5	@ Boston Bruins (1929–30)	19–13–7
40	L	March 6, 1930	0–4	@ Montreal Maroons (1929–30)	19–14–7
41	W	March 8, 1930	6–0	New York Rangers (1929–30)	20–14–7
42	T	March 11, 1930	3–3 OT	@ New York Rangers (1929–30)	20–14–8
43	T	March 13, 1930	2–2 OT	Pittsburgh Pirates (1929–30)	20–14–9
44	W	March 18, 1930	8–3	New York Americans (1929–30)	21–14–9

Legend: Win (2 points) Loss (0 points) Tie (1 point)

== Playoffs ==
The Canadiens, by placing second had to play in the first round series versus the Chicago Black Hawks. The Canadiens won the two-game total-goals series 3–2. Next, were the New York Rangers who had defeated the Ottawa Senators in their first round series. The Canadiens swept the Rangers two games to none in a best-of-three series. The teams played 68 minutes and 52 seconds of overtime in the first game before Gus Rivers scored to win the game for the Canadiens.

=== Finals ===
The Canadiens advanced to the final against the Boston Bruins. The Bruins were heavily favoured, after winning all meetings with the Canadiens during the regular season. However, it meant little as the Canadiens swept the Bruins in two straight (3–0, 4–3) to win the Stanley Cup.

== Player statistics ==
=== Regular season ===
Scoring

Player	Pos	GP	G	A	Pts	PIM
Howie Morenz	C	44	40	10	50	72
Pit Lepine	C	44	24	9	33	47
Aurel Joliat	LW	42	19	12	31	40
Wildor Larochelle	RW	44	14	11	25	28
Sylvio Mantha	D	44	13	11	24	108
Nick Wasnie	RW	44	12	11	23	64
Albert Leduc	D	44	6	8	14	90
Marty Burke	D	44	2	11	13	71
Armand Mondou	LW	44	3	5	8	24
Georges Mantha	D/LW	44	5	2	7	16
Bert McCaffrey	RW/D	28	1	3	4	26
Gerry Carson	D	35	1	0	1	8
Gus Rivers	RW	19	1	0	1	2
Gord Fraser	D	10	0	0	0	4
George Hainsworth	G	42	0	0	0	0
Mickey Murray	G	1	0	0	0	0
Roy Worters	G	1	0	0	0	0

Goaltending

Player	MIN	GP	W	L	T	GA	GAA	SO
George Hainsworth	2680	42	20	13	9	108	2.42	4
Roy Worters†	60	1	1	0	0	2	2.00	0
Mickey Murray	60	1	0	1	0	4	4.00	0
Team:	2800	44	21	14	9	114	2.44	4

† Worters was loaned from the New York Americans for one game on February 27, 1930, vs. Toronto.

=== Playoffs ===
Scoring

Player	Pos	GP	G	A	Pts	PIM
Pit Lepine	C	6	2	2	4	6
Nick Wasnie	RW	6	2	2	4	12
Albert Leduc	D	6	1	3	4	8
Howie Morenz	C	6	3	0	3	10
Sylvio Mantha	D	6	2	1	3	18
Bert McCaffrey	RW/D	6	1	1	2	6
Armand Mondou	LW	6	1	1	2	6
Aurel Joliat	LW	6	0	2	2	6
Wildor Larochelle	RW	6	1	0	1	12
Gus Rivers	RW	6	1	0	1	2
Marty Burke	D	6	0	1	1	6
Gerry Carson	D	6	0	0	0	0
George Hainsworth	G	6	0	0	0	0
Georges Mantha	D/LW	6	0	0	0	8

Goaltending

Player	MIN	GP	W	L	GA	GAA	SO
George Hainsworth	481	6	5	0	6	0.75	3
Team:	481	6	5	0	6	0.75	3

Note:

Pos = Position;GP = Games played; G = Goals; A = Assists; Pts = Points; PIM = Penalty minutes; +/- = Plus/minus; PPG = Power-play goals; SHG = Short-handed goals; GWG = Game-winning goals
Pos = Position;GP = Games played; Min, TOI = Minutes played; W = Wins; L = Losses; T,T/OT = Ties; OTL = Overtime losses; GA = Goals-against; GAA = Goals-against average; SO = Shutouts; SA = Shots against; SV = Shots saved;SV% = Save percentage;

== See also ==
- 1929–30 NHL season
