= 1929–30 New York Americans season =

National Hockey League team season

1929–30 New York Americans
- Division: 5th Canadian
- 1929–30 record: 14–25–5
- Home record: 11–7–4
- Road record: 3–18–1
- Goals for: 113
- Goals against: 161

Team information
- General manager: Lionel Conacher
- Coach: Lionel Conacher
- Captain: Billy Burch
- Arena: Madison Square Garden

Team leaders
- Goals: Norman Himes (28)
- Assists: Norman Himes (22)
- Points: Norman Himes (50)
- Penalty minutes: Lionel Conacher (73)
- Wins: Roy Worters (11)
- Goals against average: Benny Grant; Roy Worters (3.57)

The 1929–30 New York Americans season was the fifth season of play of the Americans. After making the playoffs in 1929, the team slid to last-place in the Canadian Division and did not qualify for the playoffs.

== Offseason ==
Tommy Gorman left the Americans for a position in managing the Agua Caliente Racetrack. Lionel Conacher became the playing-coach and general manager.

== Regular season ==
The season started poorly for the Amerks, winning only two games by Christmas, and by then out of the playoff race and ten games under .500. The team only won back-to-back games three times and the highlight was a modest three-game win streak in March. The team would finish eleven games under .500 for the season.

=== Final standings ===
Canadian Division
	GP	W	L	T	GF	GA	PTS
**Montreal Maroons**	44	23	16	5	141	114	**51**
**Montreal Canadiens**	44	21	14	9	142	114	**51**
**Ottawa Senators**	44	21	15	8	138	118	**50**
Toronto Maple Leafs	44	17	21	6	116	124	**40**
New York Americans	44	14	25	5	113	161	**33**

Note: W = Wins, L = Losses, T = Ties, GF = Goals For, GA = Goals Against, Pts = Points
Teams that qualified for the playoffs are highlighted in bold.

=== Record vs. opponents ===
==== Vs. Canadian Division ====
1929–30 NHL records
Team	**MTL**	**MTM**	**NYA**	**OTT**	**TOR**	**Total**
M. Canadiens	—	1–4–1	5–1	1–2–3	4–1–1	**11–8–5**
M. Maroons	4–1–1	—	5–0–1	2–3–1	3–2–1	**14–6–4**
N.Y. Americans	1–5	0–5–1	—	2–3–1	1–3–2	**4–16–4**
Ottawa	2–1–3	3–2–1	3–2–1	—	5–1	**13–6–5**
Toronto	1–4–1	2–3–1	3–1–2	1–5	—	**7–13–4**

==== Vs. American Division ====
1929–30 NHL records
Team	**BOS**	**CHI**	**DET**	**NYR**	**PIT**	**Total**
M. Canadiens	0–4	3–0–1	3–1	2–1–1	2–0–2	**10–6–4**
M. Maroons	1–3	0–4	2–1–1	2–2	4–0	**9–10–1**
N.Y. Americans	1–3	2–2	3–1	2–2	2–1–1	**10–9–1**
Ottawa	0–4	2–2	3–0–1	0–2–2	3–1	**8–9–3**
Toronto	0–4	2–1–1	2–2	3–0–1	3–1	**10–8–2**

== Schedule and results ==
1929–30 regular season
November

Game	Result	Date	Score	Opponent	Record
1	L	November 16, 1929	3–4	@ Ottawa Senators (1929–30)	0–1–0
2	L	November 19, 1929	1–5	Chicago Black Hawks (1929–30)	0–2–0
3	L	November 24, 1929	2–3 OT	Montreal Canadiens (1929–30)	0–3–0
4	W	November 28, 1929	4–3 OT	Ottawa Senators (1929–30)	1–3–0
5	L	November 30, 1929	1–3	@ Montreal Canadiens (1929–30)	1–4–0

December

Game	Result	Date	Score	Opponent	Record
6	L	December 3, 1929	0–6	@ Toronto Maple Leafs (1929–30)	1–5–0
7	L	December 5, 1929	2–3	@ Detroit Cougars (1929–30)	1–6–0
8	L	December 8, 1929	2–4	@ Chicago Black Hawks (1929–30)	1–7–0
9	W	December 10, 1929	1–0	Toronto Maple Leafs (1929–30)	2–7–0
10	L	December 14, 1929	1–8	@ Pittsburgh Pirates (1929–30)	2–8–0
11	L	December 15, 1929	4–8	Boston Bruins (1929–30)	2–9–0
12	L	December 17, 1929	2–6	@ New York Rangers (1929–30)	2–10–0
13	L	December 19, 1929	3–5	Montreal Maroons (1929–30)	2–11–0
14	L	December 21, 1929	3–5	@ Montreal Maroons (1929–30)	2–12–0
15	W	December 24, 1929	5–3	Detroit Cougars (1929–30)	3–12–0
16	W	December 29, 1929	3–2	Pittsburgh Pirates (1929–30)	4–12–0

January

Game	Result	Date	Score	Opponent	Record
17	L	January 1, 1930	2–5	@ Boston Bruins (1929–30)	4–13–0
18	W	January 2, 1930	7–1	New York Rangers (1929–30)	5–13–0
19	L	January 4, 1930	1–4	@ Ottawa Senators (1929–30)	5–14–0
20	T	January 7, 1930	1–1 OT	Toronto Maple Leafs (1929–30)	5–14–1
21	W	January 11, 1930	3–1	@ Pittsburgh Pirates (1929–30)	6–14–1
22	W	January 12, 1930	3–2	Boston Bruins (1929–30)	7–14–1
23	L	January 16, 1930	2–3 OT	Montreal Maroons (1929–30)	7–15–1
24	L	January 18, 1930	1–4	@ Toronto Maple Leafs (1929–30)	7–16–1
25	L	January 21, 1930	2–5	Montreal Canadiens (1929–30)	7–17–1
26	L	January 23, 1930	1–2 OT	@ Boston Bruins (1929–30)	7–18–1
27	T	January 26, 1930	1–1 OT	Pittsburgh Pirates (1929–30)	7–18–2
28	L	January 28, 1930	3–4 OT	@ New York Rangers (1929–30)	7–19–2
29	W	January 30, 1930	3–2	Detroit Cougars (1929–30)	8–19–2

February

Game	Result	Date	Score	Opponent	Record
30	L	February 1, 1930	2–7	@ Montreal Maroons (1929–30)	8–20–2
31	W	February 4, 1930	5–3	New York Rangers (1929–30)	9–20–2
32	L	February 9, 1930	2–3	Toronto Maple Leafs (1929–30)	9–21–2
33	T	February 16, 1930	2–2 OT	Ottawa Senators (1929–30)	9–21–3
34	W	February 18, 1930	6–4 OT	@ Chicago Black Hawks (1929–30)	10–21–3
35	T	February 20, 1930	3–3 OT	Montreal Maroons (1929–30)	10–21–4
36	L	February 22, 1930	2–9	@ Montreal Canadiens (1929–30)	10–22–4
37	W	February 25, 1930	4–2	Montreal Canadiens (1929–30)	11–22–4

March

Game	Result	Date	Score	Opponent	Record
38	L	March 1, 1930	1–5	@ Montreal Maroons (1929–30)	11–23–4
39	T	March 4, 1930	1–1 OT	@ Toronto Maple Leafs (1929–30)	11–23–5
40	W	March 6, 1930	1–0	@ Detroit Cougars (1929–30)	12–23–5
41	W	March 9, 1930	5–2	Chicago Black Hawks (1929–30)	13–23–5
42	W	March 13, 1930	2–1 OT	Ottawa Senators (1929–30)	14–23–5
43	L	March 15, 1930	7–8	@ Ottawa Senators (1929–30)	14–24–5
44	L	March 18, 1930	3–8	@ Montreal Canadiens (1929–30)	14–25–5

Legend: Win (2 points) Loss (0 points) Tie (1 point)

== Player statistics ==
=== Regular season ===
Scoring

Player	GP	G	A	Pts	PIM
Normie Himes	44	28	22	50	15
Johnny Sheppard	43	14	15	29	32
Charley McVeigh	40	14	14	28	32
Joe Simpson	44	8	13	21	41
George Patterson	39	13	4	17	24
Bill Boyd	43	7	6	13	16
Billy Burch	35	7	3	10	22
George Massecar	43	7	3	10	18
Lionel Conacher	40	4	6	10	73
Bill Holmes	42	5	4	9	33
Bill Brydge	41	2	6	8	64
Roy Burmister	40	1	1	2	0
Jake Forbes	1	0	0	0	0
Benny Grant	7	0	0	0	0
Leo Reise	24	0	0	0	0
Roy Worters	36	0	0	0	0

Goaltending

Player	MIN	GP	W	L	T	GA	GAA	SA	SV	SV%	SO
Roy Worters	2270	36	11	21	4	135	3.57				2
Benny Grant	420	7	3	4	0	25	3.57				0
Jake Forbes	70	1	0	0	1	1	0.86				0
Team:	2760	44	14	25	5	161	3.50				2

== See also ==
- 1929–30 NHL season
