= 1929–30 Toronto Maple Leafs season =

NHL hockey team season

1929–30 Toronto Maple Leafs
- Division: 4th Canadian
- 1929–30 record: 17–21–6
- Home record: 10–8–4
- Road record: 7–13–2
- Goals for: 116
- Goals against: 124

Team information
- General manager: Conn Smythe
- Coach: Conn Smythe
- Captain: Hap Day
- Arena: Arena Gardens

Team leaders
- Goals: Ace Bailey (22)
- Assists: Ace Bailey (21); Joe Primeau (21)
- Points: Ace Bailey (43)
- Penalty minutes: Red Horner (96)
- Wins: Lorne Chabot (20)
- Goals against average: Lorne Chabot (1.52)

The 1929–30 Toronto Maple Leafs season was Toronto's 13th season of play in the National Hockey League (NHL). The team missed the playoffs for this first time since the 1927–28 season.

== Regular season ==
=== Final standings ===
Canadian Division
	GP	W	L	T	GF	GA	PTS
**Montreal Maroons**	44	23	16	5	141	114	**51**
**Montreal Canadiens**	44	21	14	9	142	114	**51**
**Ottawa Senators**	44	21	15	8	138	118	**50**
Toronto Maple Leafs	44	17	21	6	116	124	**40**
New York Americans	44	14	25	5	113	161	**33**

Note: W = Wins, L = Losses, T = Ties, GF = Goals For, GA = Goals Against, Pts = Points
Teams that qualified for the playoffs are highlighted in bold.

=== Record vs. opponents ===
==== Vs. Canadian Division ====
1929–30 NHL records
Team	MTL	MTM	NYA	OTT	TOR	Total
M. Canadiens	—	1–4–1	5–1	1–2–3	4–1–1	**11–8–5**
M. Maroons	4–1–1	—	5–0–1	2–3–1	3–2–1	**14–6–4**
N.Y. Americans	1–5	0–5–1	—	2–3–1	1–3–2	**4–16–4**
Ottawa	2–1–3	3–2–1	3–2–1	—	5–1	**13–6–5**
Toronto	1–4–1	2–3–1	3–1–2	1–5	—	**7–13–4**

==== Vs. American Division ====
1929–30 NHL records
Team	BOS	CHI	DET	NYR	PIT	Total
M. Canadiens	0–4	3–0–1	3–1	2–1–1	2–0–2	**10–6–4**
M. Maroons	1–3	0–4	2–1–1	2–2	4–0	**9–10–1**
N.Y. Americans	1–3	2–2	3–1	2–2	2–1–1	**10–9–1**
Ottawa	0–4	2–2	3–0–1	0–2–2	3–1	**8–9–3**
Toronto	0–4	2–1–1	2–2	3–0–1	3–1	**10–8–2**

== Schedule and results ==
1929–30 regular season
November

Game	Result	Date	Score	Opponent	Record
1	T	November 14, 1929	2–2 OT	Chicago Black Hawks (1929–30)	0–0–1
2	L	November 16, 1929	5–6	Boston Bruins (1929–30)	0–1–1
3	L	November 19, 1929	5–10	@ Pittsburgh Pirates (1929–30)	0–2–1
4	L	November 21, 1929	2–3 OT	@ Montreal Canadiens (1929–30)	0–3–1
5	L	November 23, 1929	2–6	Ottawa Senators (1929–30)	0–4–1
6	W	November 26, 1929	4–3	@ New York Rangers (1929–30)	1–4–1
7	W	November 30, 1929	1–0	Detroit Cougars (1929–30)	2–4–1

December

Game	Result	Date	Score	Opponent	Record
8	W	December 3, 1929	6–0	New York Americans (1929–30)	3–4–1
9	L	December 5, 1929	2–9	@ Ottawa Senators (1929–30)	3–5–1
10	L	December 7, 1929	0–1	Montreal Canadiens (1929–30)	3–6–1
11	L	December 10, 1929	0–1	@ New York Americans (1929–30)	3–7–1
12	W	December 14, 1929	7–6 OT	New York Rangers (1929–30)	4–7–1
13	L	December 15, 1929	3–5	@ Detroit Cougars (1929–30)	4–8–1
14	L	December 17, 1929	1–3	@ Montreal Maroons (1929–30)	4–9–1
15	W	December 21, 1929	2–1 OT	Pittsburgh Pirates (1929–30)	5–9–1
16	L	December 25, 1929	2–6	@ Boston Bruins (1929–30)	5–10–1
17	W	December 29, 1929	4–3	@ Chicago Black Hawks (1929–30)	6–10–1

January

Game	Result	Date	Score	Opponent	Record
18	W	January 1, 1930	5–3	Montreal Maroons (1929–30)	7–10–1
19	W	January 4, 1930	4–3	Montreal Canadiens (1929–30)	8–10–1
20	T	January 7, 1930	1–1 OT	@ New York Americans (1929–30)	8–10–2
21	W	January 9, 1930	4–0	Ottawa Senators (1929–30)	9–10–2
22	T	January 14, 1930	1–1 OT	@ Montreal Maroons (1929–30)	9–10–3
23	L	January 16, 1930	1–2	@ Ottawa Senators (1929–30)	9–11–3
24	W	January 18, 1930	4–1	New York Americans (1929–30)	10–11–3
25	L	January 25, 1930	1–2	Detroit Cougars (1929–30)	10–12–3
26	L	January 30, 1930	0–3	Montreal Maroons (1929–30)	10–13–3

February

Game	Result	Date	Score	Opponent	Record
27	W	February 1, 1930	6–0	Chicago Black Hawks (1929–30)	11–13–3
28	L	February 4, 1930	1–3	@ Montreal Canadiens (1929–30)	11–14–3
29	T	February 6, 1930	3–3 OT	Montreal Canadiens (1929–30)	11–14–4
30	W	February 9, 1930	3–2	@ New York Americans (1929–30)	12–14–4
31	L	February 11, 1930	5–6 OT	@ Boston Bruins (1929–30)	12–15–4
32	L	February 15, 1930	3–5	Boston Bruins (1929–30)	12–16–4
33	W	February 18, 1930	5–1	@ New York Rangers (1929–30)	13–16–4
34	W	February 20, 1930	4–0	@ Pittsburgh Pirates (1929–30)	14–16–4
35	L	February 22, 1930	0–1	Ottawa Senators (1929–30)	14–17–4
36	L	February 25, 1930	0–2 OT	@ Ottawa Senators (1929–30)	14–18–4
37	L	February 27, 1930	2–6	@ Montreal Canadiens (1929–30)	14–19–4

March

Game	Result	Date	Score	Opponent	Record
38	T	March 1, 1930	3–3 OT	New York Rangers (1929–30)	14–19–5
39	T	March 4, 1930	1–1 OT	New York Americans (1929–30)	14–19–6
40	L	March 8, 1930	2–3	Montreal Maroons (1929–30)	14–20–6
41	W	March 9, 1930	2–1	@ Detroit Cougars (1929–30)	15–20–6
42	W	March 11, 1930	3–2	Pittsburgh Pirates (1929–30)	16–20–6
43	W	March 15, 1930	3–0	@ Montreal Maroons (1929–30)	17–20–6
44	L	March 18, 1930	1–4	@ Chicago Black Hawks (1929–30)	17–21–6

Legend: Win (2 points) Loss (0 points) Tie (1 point)

== Player statistics ==
=== Regular season ===
Scoring

Player	Pos	GP	G	A	Pts	PIM
Ace Bailey	RW	43	22	21	43	69
Baldy Cotton	LW	41	21	17	38	47
Charlie Conacher	RW	38	20	9	29	48
Joe Primeau	C	43	5	21	26	22
Andy Blair	C	42	11	10	21	27
Hap Day	D	43	7	14	21	77
Busher Jackson	LW	31	12	6	18	29
Eric Pettinger	LW/C	43	4	9	13	40
Art Duncan	D	38	4	5	9	49
Red Horner	D	33	2	7	9	96
Art Smith	D	43	3	3	6	75
Danny Cox	LW	18	1	4	5	18
Gord Brydson	C/RW	8	2	0	2	8
Frank Nighbor	C	22	2	0	2	2
Lorne Chabot	G	42	0	0	0	0
Benny Grant	G	2	0	0	0	0
Cliff McBride	RW/D	1	0	0	0	0

Goaltending

Player	MIN	GP	W	L	T	GA	GAA	SO
Lorne Chabot	2620	42	16	20	6	113	2.59	6
Benny Grant	130	2	1	1	0	11	5.08	0
Team:	2750	44	17	21	6	124	2.71	6

Note:

Pos = Position;GP = Games played; G = Goals; A = Assists; Pts = Points; PIM = Penalty minutes; +/- = Plus/minus; PPG = Power-play goals; SHG = Short-handed goals; GWG = Game-winning goals
Pos = Position;GP = Games played; Min, TOI = Minutes played; W = Wins; L = Losses; T,T/OT = Ties; OTL = Overtime losses; GA = Goals-against; GAA = Goals-against average; SO = Shutouts; SA = Shots against; SV = Shots saved;SV% = Save percentage;

== Transactions ==
- October 7, 1929: Signed Free Agent Charlie Conacher
- October 10, 1929: Acquired Gord Brydson from the Buffalo Bisons of the IHL for Carl Voss and Wes King
- October 23, 1929: Acquired Cliff McBride from the Montreal Maroons for cash
- November 12, 1929: Traded Clem Loughlin to the London Panthers of the IHL for cash
- December 6, 1929: Traded Gord Brydson to the London Panthers of the IHL for cash
- December 18, 1929: Loaned Benny Grant to the New York Americans for cash
- January 24, 1930: Loaned Benny Grant to the Minneapolis Millers of the AHA for cash
- January 31, 1930: Acquired Frank Nighbor from the Ottawa Senators for Danny Cox and cash
- February 6, 1930: Traded Cliff McBride to the Toronto Falcons of the IHL for cash
- February 10, 1930: Signed Free Agent Babe Dye

== See also ==
- 1929–30 NHL season
