= 1929–30 Pittsburgh Pirates (NHL) season =

National Hockey League team season

1929–30 Pittsburgh Pirates
- Division: 5th American
- 1929–30 record: 5–36–3
- Home record: 5–16–1
- Road record: 0–20–2
- Goals for: 102
- Goals against: 185

Team information
- Coach: Frank Fredrickson
- Captain: Gerry Lowrey
- Arena: Duquesne Garden

Team leaders
- Goals: Gerry Lowrey (16)
- Assists: Harold Darragh (17)
- Points: Harold Darragh (32)
- Penalty minutes: Rodger Smith (69)
- Wins: Joe Miller (5)
- Goals against average: Joe Miller (4.08)

The 1929–30 Pittsburgh Pirates season was the franchise's last season in Pittsburgh. The Pirates had an extremely poor season, winning only five of 44 games to finish last in the American Division, missing the playoffs. The team moved in 1930 to Philadelphia and NHL hockey did not return to Pittsburgh until 1967.

== Regular season ==
=== Final standings ===
American Division
	GP	W	L	T	GF	GA	PTS
**Boston Bruins**	44	38	5	1	179	98	**77**
**Chicago Black Hawks**	44	21	18	5	117	111	**47**
**New York Rangers**	44	17	17	10	136	143	**44**
Detroit Cougars	44	14	24	6	117	133	**34**
Pittsburgh Pirates	44	5	36	3	102	185	**13**

Note: GP = Games Played, W = Wins, L = Losses, T = Ties, Pts = Points, GF = Goals For, GA = Goals Against
Teams that qualified for the playoffs are highlighted in bold.

=== Record vs. opponents ===
==== Vs. American Division ====
1929–30 NHL records
Team	**BOS**	**CHI**	**DET**	**NYR**	**PIT**	**Total**
Boston	—	3–3	6–0	5–0–1	6–0	**20–3–1**
Chicago	3–3	—	2–3–1	1–3–2	6–0	**12–9–3**
Detroit	0–6	3–2–1	—	2–1–3	4–2	**9–11–4**
N.Y. Rangers	0–5–1	3–1–2	1–2–3	—	6–0	**10–8–6**
Pittsburgh	0–6	0–6	2–4	0–6	—	**2–22–0**

==== Vs. Canadian Division ====
1929–30 NHL records
Team	**MTL**	**MTM**	**NYA**	**OTT**	**TOR**	**Total**
Boston	4–0	3–1	3–1	4–0	4–0	**18–2–0**
Chicago	0–3–1	4–0	2–2	2–2	1–2–1	**9–9–2**
Detroit	1–3	1–2–1	1–3	0–3–1	2–2	**5–13–2**
N.Y. Rangers	1–2–1	2–2	2–2	2–0–2	0–3–1	**7–9–4**
Pittsburgh	0–2–2	0–4	1–2–1	1–3	1–3	**3–14–3**

== Schedule and results ==
1929–30 regular season
November

Game	Result	Date	Score	Opponent	Record
1	L	November 16, 1929	2–5	Montreal Maroons (1929–30)	0–1–0
2	W	November 19, 1929	10–5	Toronto Maple Leafs (1929–30)	1–1–0
3	L	November 23, 1929	3–5	New York Rangers (1929–30)	1–2–0
4	L	November 26, 1929	2–9	@ Montreal Canadiens (1929–30)	1–3–0
5	L	November 30, 1929	2–6	Boston Bruins (1929–30)	1–4–0

December

Game	Result	Date	Score	Opponent	Record
6	L	December 3, 1929	1–2	@ Montreal Maroons (1929–30)	1–5–0
7	L	December 5, 1929	2–5	Chicago Black Hawks (1929–30)	1–6–0
8	L	December 8, 1929	1–5	@ New York Rangers (1929–30)	1–7–0
9	L	December 10, 1929	4–5	@ Boston Bruins (1929–30)	1–8–0
10	W	December 14, 1929	8–1	New York Americans (1929–30)	2–8–0
11	L	December 15, 1929	1–3	@ Chicago Black Hawks (1929–30)	2–9–0
12	T	December 17, 1929	3–3 OT	Montreal Canadiens (1929–30)	2–9–1
13	L	December 21, 1929	1–2 OT	@ Toronto Maple Leafs (1929–30)	2–10–1
14	L	December 22, 1929	1–6	@ Detroit Cougars (1929–30)	2–11–1
15	W	December 26, 1929	3–1	Detroit Cougars (1929–30)	3–11–1
16	L	December 29, 1929	2–3	@ New York Americans (1929–30)	3–12–1

January

Game	Result	Date	Score	Opponent	Record
17	W	January 2, 1930	3–1	Ottawa Senators (1929–30)	4–12–1
18	L	January 5, 1930	3–8	@ New York Rangers (1929–30)	4–13–1
19	L	January 9, 1930	3–4	Boston Bruins (1929–30)	4–14–1
20	L	January 11, 1930	1–3	New York Americans (1929–30)	4–15–1
21	L	January 12, 1930	2–3	@ Detroit Cougars (1929–30)	4–16–1
22	L	January 14, 1930	2–6	@ Chicago Black Hawks (1929–30)	4–17–1
23	L	January 18, 1930	5–6	New York Rangers (1929–30)	4–18–1
24	L	January 21, 1930	4–7	@ Ottawa Senators (1929–30)	4–19–1
25^{A}	L	January 25, 1930	2–5	Chicago Black Hawks (1929–30)	4–20–1
26	T	January 26, 1930	1–1 OT	@ New York Americans (1929–30)	4–20–2
27	L	January 28, 1930	0–6	@ Boston Bruins (1929–30)	4–21–2
Notes: A – Played at Atlantic City, New Jersey

February

Game	Result	Date	Score	Opponent	Record
28	W	February 1, 1930	3–2	Detroit Cougars (1929–30)	5–21–2
29	L	February 4, 1930	1–5	Ottawa Senators (1929–30)	5–22–2
30	L	February 9, 1930	1–8	@ Detroit Cougars (1929–30)	5–23–2
31	L	February 12, 1930	3–4	Boston Bruins (1929–30)	5–24–2
32	L	February 13, 1930	1–4	@ New York Rangers (1929–30)	5–25–2
33	L	February 15, 1930	1–3	@ Montreal Maroons (1929–30)	5–26–2
34	L	February 18, 1930	2–3	@ Ottawa Senators (1929–30)	5–27–2
35	L	February 20, 1930	0–4	Toronto Maple Leafs (1929–30)	5–28–2
36	L	February 22, 1930	4–5	Montreal Maroons (1929–30)	5–29–2
37	L	February 25, 1930	0–7	@ Boston Bruins (1929–30)	5–30–2

March

Game	Result	Date	Score	Opponent	Record
38	L	March 1, 1930	2–4	Montreal Canadiens (1929–30)	5–31–2
39	L	March 2, 1930	0–3	@ Chicago Black Hawks (1929–30)	5–32–2
40^{B}	L	March 8, 1930	3–4	Chicago Black Hawks (1929–30)	5–33–2
41	L	March 11, 1930	2–3	@ Toronto Maple Leafs (1929–30)	5–34–2
42	T	March 13, 1930	2–2 OT	@ Montreal Canadiens (1929–30)	5–34–3
43	L	March 15, 1930	3–4 OT	New York Rangers (1929–30)	5–35–3
44	L	March 18, 1930	2–4	Detroit Cougars (1929–30)	5–36–3
Notes: B – Played at Peace Bridge, Buffalo, New York.

Legend: Win (2 points) Loss (0 points) Tie (1 point)

== Player statistics ==
=== Regular season ===
Scoring

Player	Pos	GP	G	A	Pts	PIM
Harold Darragh	LW	42	15	17	32	6
Gerry Lowrey	LW	44	16	14	30	30
Hib Milks	LW/C	41	13	11	24	36
James "Bud" Jarvis	LW	44	11	8	19	32
Johnny McKinnon	D	41	10	7	17	42
Frank Fredrickson	C	9	4	7	11	20
Gord Fraser	D	30	6	4	10	37
Tex White	RW	29	8	1	9	16
Archie Briden	LW	29	4	3	7	20
Bert McCaffrey	RW/D	15	3	4	7	12
Cliff Barton	RW	39	4	2	6	4
Rennison Manners	C	33	3	2	5	14
Rodger Smith	D	42	2	1	3	65
Herb Drury	D/RW	27	2	0	2	12
Jesse Spring	D	22	1	0	1	18
Joe Miller	G	43	0	0	0	0
Red Spooner	G	1	0	0	0	0

Goaltending

Player	MIN	GP	W	L	T	GA	GAA	SO
Joe Miller	2630	43	5	35	3	179	4.08	0
Red Spooner	60	1	0	1	0	6	6.00	0
Team:	2690	44	5	36	3	185	4.13	0

Note: GP = Games played; G = Goals; A = Assists; Pts = Points; +/- = Plus/minus; PIM = Penalty minutes; PPG=Power-play goals; SHG=Short-handed goals; GWG=Game-winning goals
MIN=Minutes played; W = Wins; L = Losses; T = Ties; GA = Goals against; GAA = Goals against average; SO = Shutouts;

== See also ==
- 1929–30 NHL season
