= Red Spooner =

Canadian ice hockey player

- Born: August 24, 1910 Port Arthur, Ontario, Canada
- Died: May 7, 1984 (aged 73)
- Height: 5 ft 8 in (173 cm)
- Weight: 170 lb (77 kg; 12 st 2 lb)
- Position: Goaltender
- Caught: Left
- Played for: Pittsburgh Pirates
- Playing career: 1926–1933

Andrew George "Red" Spooner (August 24, 1910 — May 7, 1984) was a Canadian professional ice hockey goaltender who played in one National Hockey League game for the Pittsburgh Pirates during the 1929–30 NHL season.

== Career statistics ==
=== Regular season and playoffs ===
			Regular season								Playoffs
Season	Team	League	GP	W	L	T	Min	GA	SO	GAA	GP	W	L	T	Min	GA	SO	GAA
1926–27	Port Arthur Bearcats	TBSHL	1	—	—	—	—	—	0	2.00	—	—	—	—	—	—	—	—
1926–27	Port Arthur Bruins	TBJHL	—	—	—	—	—	—	—	—	3	2	1	0	190	5	1	1.58
1926–27	Port Arthur Bruins	M-Cup	—	—	—	—	—	—	—	—	6	3	3	0	370	19	0	3.08
1927–28	Port Arthur Bearcats	TBSHL	1	1	0	0	—	—	0	2.00	—	—	—	—	—	—	—	—
1928–29	Fort William Forts	TBSHL	—	—	—	—	—	—	—	—	—	—	—	—	—	—	—	—
1929–30	Fort William Forts	TBSHL	—	—	—	—	—	—	—	—	—	—	—	—	—	—	—	—
1930–31	Pittsburgh Pirates	NHL	1	0	1	0	60	6	0	6.00	—	—	—	—	—	—	—	—
1930–31	Port Arthur Ports	TBSHL	—	—	—	—	—	—	—	—	—	—	—	—	—	—	—	—
1931–32	Port Arthur Ports	TBSHL	—	—	—	—	—	—	—	—	—	—	—	—	—	—	—	—
1932–33	Port Arthur Ports	TBSHL	6	—	—	—	360	10	2	1.67	1	—	—	—	60	3	0	3.00
NHL totals			1	0	1	0	60	6	0	6.00	—	—	—	—	—	—	—	—

== See also ==
- List of players who played only one game in the NHL
