= 1929–30 NHL transactions =

The following is a list of all team-to-team transactions that have occurred in the National Hockey League (NHL) during the 1929–30 NHL season. It lists which team each player has been traded to and for which player(s) or other consideration(s), if applicable.

== Transactions ==
May 13, 1929	To Boston Bruins Herb Gardiner; George Patterson; Art Gagne	To Montreal Canadiens cash
September 1, 1929	To Montreal Maroons Duke McCurry	To Pittsburgh Pirates cash
September 30, 1929	To Detroit Cougars Hal Hicks	To Montreal Maroons $8,000 cash
October 8, 1929	To Pittsburgh Pirates Archie Briden	To New York Rangers cash
October 10, 1929	To Montreal Canadiens Gord Fraser	To Detroit Cougars cash
October 23, 1929	To Toronto Maple Leafs Cliff McBride	To Montreal Maroons cash
November 22, 1929	To New York Americans Bill Brydge	To Detroit Cougars $5,000 cash
December 18, 1929	To New York Americans loan of Benny Grant	To Toronto Maple Leafs cash
December 21, 1929	To Ottawa Senators Art Gagne	To Boston Bruins cash
December 23, 1929	To Pittsburgh Pirates Gord Fraser	To Montreal Canadiens Bert McCaffrey
January 30, 1930	To Boston Bruins Harry Connor	To Ottawa Senators Bill Hutton
January 31, 1930	To Toronto Maple Leafs Frank Nighbor	To Ottawa Senators Danny Cox cash
February 6, 1930	To New York Rangers rights to Leo Reise	To New York Americans cash
February 17, 1930	To Boston Bruins Yip Foster $15,000 cash	To New York Rangers Bill Regan
