= 1929–30 Ottawa Senators season =

Professional ice hockey team season of play

1929–30 Ottawa Senators
- Division: 3rd Canadian
- 1929–30 record: 21–15–8
- Home record: 13–6–3
- Road record: 8–9–5
- Goals for: 138
- Goals against: 118

Team information
- General manager: Dave Gill
- Coach: Newsy Lalonde
- Captain: King Clancy
- Arena: Ottawa Auditorium

Team leaders
- Goals: Hec Kilrea (36)
- Assists: King Clancy (23)
- Points: Hec Kilrea (58)
- Penalty minutes: Joe Lamb (119)
- Wins: Alec Connell (21)
- Goals against average: Alec Connell (2.55)

The 1929–30 Ottawa Senators season was the club's 13th season in the NHL, 45th overall. The Senators finished third in the Canadian Division, making the playoffs, losing in the first round to the New York Rangers. It would be the original Senators last playoff appearance.

== Team business ==
The Senators made a modification to their jerseys, adding an "O" logo to the chest of their jerseys. The club had last wore an "O" back in 1901 when they shared jerseys with the Ottawa Football Club.

According to Frank Ahearn, the Senators lost $CDN 32,000 ($577,407 in 2025 dollars) on the season. As told to King Clancy, this was the prime reason for the trade of Clancy before the next season. It was part of a pattern of Ottawa selling players off to cover losses.

== Regular season ==
The Senators would continue to have some financial difficulties, and due to poor attendance against US-based teams, the Senators moved two home games to Atlantic City against the New York Americans and New York Rangers, along with two to Detroit, and a game to Boston.

Newsy Lalonde was unable to finish the season as coach due to illness. Manager Dave Gill took over as coach, and guided the Senators to a playoff position.

Hec Kilrea would lead the club with 36 goals and 58 points, while King Clancy would add 40 points (17 goals and 23 assists) from the blue line. Joe Lamb would provide toughness, leading the NHL with 119 penalty minutes, and would have a very good offensive season, finishing with 29 goals and 49 points. Alec Connell would once again be steady in the Senators net, winning 21 games, earning three shutouts and be among the league leaders in GAA at 2.55.

=== Final standings ===
Canadian Division
	GP	W	L	T	GF	GA	PTS
**Montreal Maroons**	44	23	16	5	141	114	**51**
**Montreal Canadiens**	44	21	14	9	142	114	**51**
**Ottawa Senators**	44	21	15	8	138	118	**50**
Toronto Maple Leafs	44	17	21	6	116	124	**40**
New York Americans	44	14	25	5	113	161	**33**

Note: W = Wins, L = Losses, T = Ties, GF = Goals For, GA = Goals Against, Pts = Points
Teams that qualified for the playoffs are highlighted in bold.

=== Record vs. opponents ===
==== Vs. Canadian Division ====
1929–30 NHL records
Team	MTL	MTM	NYA	OTT	TOR	Total
M. Canadiens	—	1–4–1	5–1	1–2–3	4–1–1	**11–8–5**
M. Maroons	4–1–1	—	5–0–1	2–3–1	3–2–1	**14–6–4**
N.Y. Americans	1–5	0–5–1	—	2–3–1	1–3–2	**4–16–4**
Ottawa	2–1–3	3–2–1	3–2–1	—	5–1	**13–6–5**
Toronto	1–4–1	2–3–1	3–1–2	1–5	—	**7–13–4**

==== Vs. American Division ====
1929–30 NHL records
Team	BOS	CHI	DET	NYR	PIT	Total
M. Canadiens	0–4	3–0–1	3–1	2–1–1	2–0–2	**10–6–4**
M. Maroons	1–3	0–4	2–1–1	2–2	4–0	**9–10–1**
N.Y. Americans	1–3	2–2	3–1	2–2	2–1–1	**10–9–1**
Ottawa	0–4	2–2	3–0–1	0–2–2	3–1	**8–9–3**
Toronto	0–4	2–1–1	2–2	3–0–1	3–1	**10–8–2**

== Schedule and results ==
1929–30 regular season
November: 5–2–1 (home: 2–1–1; road: 3–1–0)

Game	Date	Visitor	Score	Home	OT	Decision	Attendance	Arena	Record	Pts
1	November 14	Canadiens	3–3	Ottawa	OT	Connell	N/A	Ottawa Auditorium	0–0–1	1
2	November 16	Rangers	3–4	Ottawa		Connell	N/A	Ottawa Auditorium	1–0–1	3
3	November 19	Ottawa	6–4	Detroit		Connell	N/A	Detroit Olympia	2–0–1	5
4	November 21	Ottawa	6–5	Chicago	OT	Connell	N/A	Chicago Coliseum	3–0–1	7
5	November 23	Ottawa	6–2	Toronto		Connell	N/A	Mutual Street Arena	4–0–1	9
6	November 26	Detroit	3–4	Ottawa	OT	Connell	N/A	Detroit Olympia	5–0–1	11
7	November 28	Ottawa	3–4	Americans		Connell	N/A	Madison Square Garden	5–1–1	11
8	November 26	Maroons	3–2	Ottawa		Connell	N/A	Ottawa Auditorium	5–2–1	11

December: 1–5–3 (home: 1–3–1; road: 0–2–2)

Game	Date	Visitor	Score	Home	OT	Decision	Attendance	Arena	Record	Pts
9	December 5	Toronto	2–9	Ottawa		Connell	N/A	Ottawa Auditorium	6–2–1	13
10	December 7	Ottawa	3–3	Maroons	OT	Connell	N/A	Montreal Forum	6–2–2	14
11	December 12	Boston	3–2	Ottawa		Connell	N/A	Ottawa Auditorium	6–3–2	14
12	December 14	Ottawa	4–6	Canadiens		Connell	N/A	Montreal Forum	6–4–2	14
13	December 17	Ottawa	2–6	Boston		Connell	N/A	Boston Garden	6–5–2	14
14	December 21	Canadiens	1–1	Ottawa	OT	Connell	N/A	Ottawa Auditorium	6–5–3	15
15	December 24	Chicago	3–1	Ottawa		Connell	N/A	Ottawa Auditorium	6–6–3	15
16	December 28	Rangers	3–1	Ottawa		Connell	N/A	Boardwalk Hall	6–7–3	15
17	December 31	Ottawa	1–1	Rangers		Connell	N/A	Madison Square Garden	6–7–4	16

January: 5–6–0 (home: 4–1–0; road: 1–5–0)

Game	Date	Visitor	Score	Home	OT	Decision	Attendance	Arena	Record	Pts
18	January 2	Ottawa	1–3	Pittsburgh		Connell	N/A	Duquesne Garden	6–8–4	16
19	January 4	Americans	1–4	Ottawa		Connell	N/A	Ottawa Auditorium	7–8–4	17
20	January 9	Ottawa	0–4	Toronto		Connell	N/A	Mutual Street Arena	7–9–4	18
21	January 11	Ottawa	2–1	Canadiens	OT	Connell	N/A	Montreal Forum	8–9–4	20
22	January 14	Ottawa	1–5	Boston		Connell	N/A	Boston Garden	8–10–4	20
23	January 16	Toronto	1–2	Ottawa		Connell	N/A	Ottawa Auditorium	9–10–4	22
24	January 18	Ottawa	1–2	Maroons		Connell	N/A	Montreal Forum	9–11–4	22
25	January 21	Pittsburgh	4–7	Ottawa		Connell	N/A	Ottawa Auditorium	10–11–4	24
26	January 23	Ottawa	3–6	Rangers		Connell	N/A	Madison Square Garden	10–12–4	24
27	January 25	Maroons	0–4	Ottawa		Connell	N/A	Ottawa Auditorium	11–12–4	26
28	January 28	Chicago	2–1	Ottawa		Connell	N/A	Ottawa Auditorium	11–13–4	26

February: 6–0–4 (home: 3–0–1; road: 3–0–3)

Game	Date	Visitor	Score	Home	OT	Decision	Attendance	Arena	Record	Pts
29	February 1	Canadiens	1–4	Ottawa		Connell	N/A	Ottawa Auditorium	12–13–4	28
30	February 4	Ottawa	5–1	Pittsburgh		Connell	N/A	Duquesne Garden	13–13–4	30
31	February 8	Rangers	2–2	Ottawa	OT	Connell	N/A	Ottawa Auditorium	13–13–5	31
32	February 13	Ottawa	4–4	Canadiens	OT	Connell	N/A	Montreal Forum	13–13–6	32
33	February 16	Ottawa	2–2	Americans	OT	Connell	N/A	Madison Square Garden	13–13–7	33
34	February 18	Pittsburgh	2–3	Ottawa		Connell	N/A	Ottawa Auditorium	14–13–7	35
35	February 20	Ottawa	5–2	Chicago		Connell	N/A	Chicago Stadium	15–13–7	37
36	February 22	Ottawa	1–0	Toronto		Connell	N/A	Mutual Street Arena	16–13–7	39
37	February 25	Toronto	0–2	Ottawa	OT	Connell	N/A	Ottawa Auditorium	17–13–7	41
38	February 27	Ottawa	3–3	Detroit	OT	Connell	N/A	Detroit Olympia	17–13–8	42

March: 4–2–0 (home: 3–1–0; road: 1–1–0)

Game	Date	Visitor	Score	Home	OT	Decision	Attendance	Arena	Record	Pts
39	March 1	Boston	2–1	Ottawa		Connell	N/A	Boston Garden	17–14–8	42
40	March 4	Maroons	2–6	Ottawa		Connell	N/A	Ottawa Auditorium	18–14–8	44
41	March 8	Detroit	2–3	Ottawa		Connell	N/A	Detroit Olympia	19–14–8	46
42	March 11	Ottawa	4–2	Maroons		Connell	N/A	Montreal Forum	20–14–8	48
43	March 13	Ottawa	1–2	Americans	OT	Connell	N/A	Madison Square Garden	20–15–8	48
44	March 15	Americans	7–8	Ottawa		Connell	N/A	Boardwalk Hall	21–15–8	50

Legend: Win (2 points) Loss (0 points) Tie (1 point)

== Playoffs ==
=== New York Rangers 6, Ottawa Senators 3 ===
The Senators went against the Rangers and lost 6 goals to 3.

1930 Stanley Cup playoffs
Quarterfinals vs. (A3) New York Rangers – Rangers win 6 goals to 3 goals

Game	Date	Visitor	Score	Home	OT	Decision	Attendance	Arena	Series
1	March 20	Rangers	1–1	Ottawa		Connell	N/A	Ottawa Auditorium	1–1
2	March 23	Ottawa	2–5	Rangers		Connell	N/A	Madison Square Garden	3–6

Legend: Win Loss Tie

== Player statistics ==
=== Regular season ===
Scoring

Player	Pos	GP	G	A	Pts	PIM
Hec Kilrea	LW	44	36	22	58	72
Joe Lamb	RW	44	29	20	49	119
King Clancy	D	44	17	23	40	83
Frank Finnigan	RW	43	21	15	36	46
Bill Touhey	LW	44	10	3	13	24
Art Gagne	RW	33	6	4	10	32
Al Shields	D	44	6	3	9	32
Alex Smith	D	43	2	6	8	91
Wally Kilrea	RW/C	38	4	2	6	4
Danny Cox	LW	24	3	2	5	20
Harold Starr	D	28	2	1	3	12
Harry Connor	LW	25	1	2	3	22
Len Grosvenor	C/RW	15	0	3	3	19
Syd Howe	C/LW	12	1	1	2	0
Bill Hutton	D/RW	18	0	1	1	0
Alec Connell	G	44	0	0	0	0
Frank Nighbor	C	19	0	0	0	0

Goaltending

Player	MIN	GP	W	L	T	GA	GAA	SO
Alec Connell	2780	44	21	15	8	118	2.55	3
Team:	2780	44	21	15	8	118	2.55	3

=== Playoffs ===
Scoring

Player	Pos	GP	G	A	Pts	PIM
Art Gagne	RW	2	1	0	1	4
Harold Starr	D	2	1	0	1	0
Bill Touhey	LW	2	1	0	1	0
King Clancy	D	2	0	1	1	2
Alec Connell	G	2	0	0	0	0
Danny Cox	LW	2	0	0	0	0
Frank Finnigan	RW	1	0	0	0	4
Syd Howe	C/LW	2	0	0	0	0
Bill Hutton	D/RW	2	0	0	0	0
Hec Kilrea	LW	2	0	0	0	4
Wally Kilrea	RW/C	2	0	0	0	0
Joe Lamb	RW	2	0	0	0	11
Al Shields	D	2	0	0	0	0
Alex Smith	D	2	0	0	0	4

Goaltending

Player	MIN	GP	W	L	T	GA	GAA	SO
Alec Connell	120	2	0	1	1	6	3.00	0
Team:	120	2	0	1	1	6	3.00	0

Note:

Pos = Position;GP = Games played; G = Goals; A = Assists; Pts = Points; PIM = Penalty minutes; +/- = Plus/minus; PPG = Power-play goals; SHG = Short-handed goals; GWG = Game-winning goals
Pos = Position;GP = Games played; Min, TOI = Minutes played; W = Wins; L = Losses; T,T/OT = Ties; OTL = Overtime losses; GA = Goals-against; GAA = Goals-against average; SO = Shutouts; SA = Shots against; SV = Shots saved;SV% = Save percentage;

== Transactions ==
The Senators were involved in the following transactions during the 1929–30 season.

=== Trades ===
November 1, 1929	To Ottawa Senators Cash	To Buffalo Bisons (IHL) Sammy Godin
November 7, 1929	To Ottawa Senators Cash	To Hamilton Tigers (IHL) Jack Duggan; Milt Halliday
November 27, 1929	To Ottawa Senators Cash	To Detroit Cougars Loan of Bill Beveridge
December 21, 1929	To Ottawa Senators Art Gagne	To Boston Bruins Cash
December 26, 1929	To Ottawa Senators Cash	To London Panthers (IHL) Loan of Len Grosvenor
January 30, 1930	To Ottawa Senators Bill Hutton	To Boston Bruins Harry Connor
January 31, 1930	To Ottawa Senators Danny Cox; Cash	To Toronto Maple Leafs Frank Nighbor

=== Free agents signed ===
January 16, 1930	From London Panthers (IHL) Syd Howe

=== Waivers claimed ===
November 18, 1929	From New York Americans Harry Connor

== See also ==
- 1929–30 NHL season
