= Bill Phillips (ice hockey) =

Canadian ice hockey player

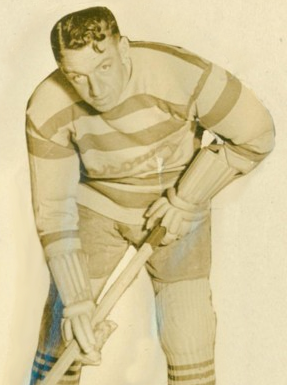
- Bill "Batt" Phillips with the Montreal Maroons
- Born: September 23, 1902; Carleton Place, Ontario, Canada
- Died: December 25, 1998 (aged 96); Qualicum Beach, British Columbia, Canada
- Height: 5 ft 11 in (180 cm)
- Weight: 163 lb (74 kg; 11 st 9 lb)
- Position: Centre
- Shot: Right
- Played for: Montreal Maroons
- Playing career: 1922–1942

William John Orville "Batt" Phillips (September 23, 1902 – December 25, 1998) was a Canadian ice hockey player who played 27 games in the National Hockey League with the Montreal Maroons during the 1929–30 season. The rest of his career, which lasted from 1922 to 1942, was spent in various minor leagues. Born in Carleton Place, Ontario, later lived in British Columbia after retiring, and died in Qualicum Beach in 1998.

== Career statistics ==
=== Regular season and playoffs ===
			Regular season					Playoffs
Season	Team	League	GP	G	A	Pts	PIM	GP	G	A	Pts	PIM
1922–23	Carleton Place Seniors	UOVHL	12	17	5	22	—	—	—	—	—	—
1924–25	New York Athletics	USAHA	—	—	—	—	—	—	—	—	—	—
1925–26	Brandon Regals	S-SSHL	15	12	3	15	14	—	—	—	—	—
1926–27	Kenora Thistles	TBSHL	19	15	5	20	15	—	—	—	—	—
1927–28	Winnipeg Maroons	AHA	10	1	0	1	8	—	—	—	—	—
1928–29	Vancouver Lions	PCHL	32	10	9	19	81	3	1	1	2	4
1929–30	Vancouver Lions	PCHL	11	5	1	6	10	—	—	—	—	—
1929–30	Montreal Maroons	NHL	27	1	1	2	6	4	0	0	0	2
1929–30	Windsor Bulldogs	IHL	1	1	0	1	0	—	—	—	—	—
1930–31	Windsor Bulldogs	IHL	35	6	17	23	20	6	2	1	3	2
1931–32	Windsor Bulldogs	IHL	47	7	14	21	37	6	0	0	0	7
1932–33	Philadelphia Arrows	Can-Am	47	10	24	34	47	5	0	0	0	0
1933–34	Windsor Bulldogs	IHL	13	3	1	4	6	—	—	—	—	—
1933–34	Quebec Castors	Can-Am	31	4	4	8	6	—	—	—	—	—
1934–35	Quebec Castors	Can-Am	39	4	16	20	4	3	0	0	0	0
1934–35	Cleveland Falcons	IHL	2	0	0	0	2	—	—	—	—	—
1937–38	Carleton Place Red Wings	UOVHL	6	1	7	8	2	5	4	5	9	4
1938–39	Carleton Place Red Wings	UOVHL	14	7	10	17	4	4	2	4	6	0
1939–40	Carleton Place Red Wings	UOVHL	11	3	9	12	4	3	0	0	0	0
1940–41	Nanaimo Clippers	PCSHL	—	—	—	—	—	—	—	—	—	—
1941–42	Nanaimo Clippers	PCSHL	15	2	4	6	9	—	—	—	—	—
Can-Am totals			117	18	44	62	57	8	0	0	0	0
NHL totals			27	1	1	2	6	4	0	0	0	2
