= Tom Shaughnessy =

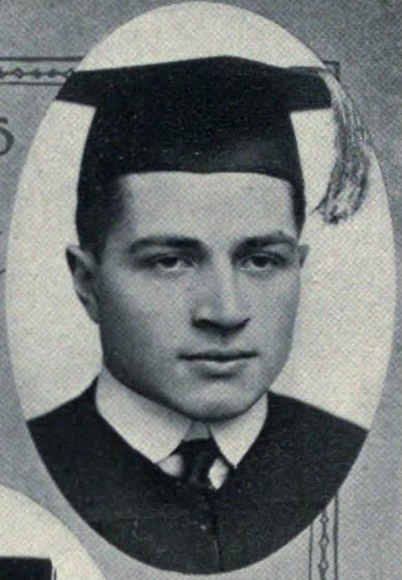
Tom Shaughnessy at Notre Dame, 1915 senior portrait

Thomas Joseph Shaughnessy (July 12, 1892 – September 21, 1938) was an American ice hockey player and coach. Shaughnessy was head coach of the Chicago Black Hawks for most of the 1929–30 Black Hawks season. He resigned on January 16, 1930 to go into law practice.

He was an alumnus of the University of Notre Dame (1915), where he played football under coach Knute Rockne. In September 1938, Shaughnessy died of a heart attack, aged 46.

== Coaching record ==
Team	Year	Regular season						Postseason
Team	Year	G	W	L	T	Pts	Division rank	Result
CHI	1929–30	21	10	8	3	23	2nd in American	(Fired)
Total		21	10	8	3	23		

Preceded by Dick Irvin	Head coach of the Chicago Black Hawks; 1929–30	Succeeded by Bill Tobin
