= 1929–30 Detroit Cougars season =

National Hockey League team season

1929–30 Detroit Cougars
- Division: 4th American
- 1929–30 record: 14–24–6
- Home record: 9–10–3
- Road record: 5–14–3
- Goals for: 117
- Goals against: 133

Team information
- General manager: Jack Adams
- Coach: Jack Adams
- Captain: Reg Noble
- Arena: Detroit Olympia

Team leaders
- Goals: Herbie Lewis (19)
- Assists: Carson Cooper (18)
- Points: Carson Cooper (36)
- Penalty minutes: Harvey Rockburn (101)
- Wins: Bill Beveridge (14)
- Goals against average: Bill Beveridge (2.71)

The 1929–30 Detroit Cougars season was the fourth season of the Detroit franchise in the National Hockey League (NHL). After qualifying for the playoffs by finishing third in the American Division in 1928–29, the Cougars slipped to fourth to miss the playoffs for the first time since the 1927–28 season.

== Regular season ==
=== Final standings ===
American Division
	GP	W	L	T	GF	GA	PTS
**Boston Bruins**	44	38	5	1	179	98	**77**
**Chicago Black Hawks**	44	21	18	5	117	111	**47**
**New York Rangers**	44	17	17	10	136	143	**44**
Detroit Cougars	44	14	24	6	117	133	**34**
Pittsburgh Pirates	44	5	36	3	102	185	**13**

Note: GP = Games Played, W = Wins, L = Losses, T = Ties, Pts = Points, GF = Goals For, GA = Goals Against
Teams that qualified for the playoffs are highlighted in bold.

=== Record vs. opponents ===
==== Vs. American Division ====
1929–30 NHL records
Team	**BOS**	**CHI**	**DET**	**NYR**	**PIT**	**Total**
Boston	—	3–3	6–0	5–0–1	6–0	**20–3–1**
Chicago	3–3	—	2–3–1	1–3–2	6–0	**12–9–3**
Detroit	0–6	3–2–1	—	2–1–3	4–2	**9–11–4**
N.Y. Rangers	0–5–1	3–1–2	1–2–3	—	6–0	**10–8–6**
Pittsburgh	0–6	0–6	2–4	0–6	—	**2–22–0**

==== Vs. Canadian Division ====
1929–30 NHL records
Team	**MTL**	**MTM**	**NYA**	**OTT**	**TOR**	**Total**
Boston	4–0	3–1	3–1	4–0	4–0	**18–2–0**
Chicago	0–3–1	4–0	2–2	2–2	1–2–1	**9–9–2**
Detroit	1–3	1–2–1	1–3	0–3–1	2–2	**5–13–2**
N.Y. Rangers	1–2–1	2–2	2–2	2–0–2	0–3–1	**7–9–4**
Pittsburgh	0–2–2	0–4	1–2–1	1–3	1–3	**3–14–3**

== Schedule and results ==
1929–30 regular season
November

Game	Result	Date	Score	Opponent	Record
1	L	November 14, 1929	2–5	Boston Bruins (1929–30)	0–1–0
2	T	November 17, 1929	5–5 OT	@ New York Rangers (1929–30)	0–1–1
3	L	November 19, 1929	4–6	Ottawa Senators (1929–30)	0–2–1
4	L	November 24, 1929	0–4	@ Chicago Black Hawks (1929–30)	0–3–1
5	L	November 26, 1929	3–4 OT	@ Ottawa Senators (1929–30)	0–4–1
6	W	November 28, 1929	7–6	@ Montreal Maroons (1929–30)	1–4–1
7	L	November 30, 1929	0–1	@ Toronto Maple Leafs (1929–30)	1–5–1

December

Game	Result	Date	Score	Opponent	Record
8	W	December 1, 1929	4–3	New York Rangers (1929–30)	2–5–1
9	W	December 5, 1929	3–2	New York Americans (1929–30)	3–5–1
10	L	December 7, 1929	1–2	@ Boston Bruins (1929–30)	3–6–1
11	L	December 10, 1929	3–5 OT	@ Montreal Canadiens (1929–30)	3–7–1
12	W	December 15, 1929	5–3	Toronto Maple Leafs (1929–30)	4–7–1
13	W	December 19, 1929	4–3	Chicago Black Hawks (1929–30)	5–7–1
14	W	December 22, 1929	6–1	Pittsburgh Pirates (1929–30)	6–7–1
15	L	December 24, 1929	3–5	@ New York Americans (1929–30)	6–8–1
16	L	December 26, 1929	1–3	@ Pittsburgh Pirates (1929–30)	6–9–1
17	L	December 29, 1929	2–6	Montreal Maroons (1929–30)	6–10–1

January

Game	Result	Date	Score	Opponent	Record
18	W	January 2, 1930	4–0	Montreal Canadiens (1929–30)	7–10–1
19	W	January 5, 1930	4–0	@ Chicago Black Hawks (1929–30)	8–10–1
20	T	January 9, 1930	1–1 OT	Chicago Black Hawks (1929–30)	8–10–2
21	W	January 12, 1930	3–2	Pittsburgh Pirates (1929–30)	9–10–2
22	L	January 14, 1930	0–3	@ New York Rangers (1929–30)	9–11–2
23	L	January 16, 1930	1–6	@ Montreal Canadiens (1929–30)	9–12–2
24	L	January 19, 1930	4–5	Boston Bruins (1929–30)	9–13–2
25	T	January 23, 1930	2–2 OT	@ Montreal Maroons (1929–30)	9–13–3
26	W	January 25, 1930	2–1	@ Toronto Maple Leafs (1929–30)	10–13–3
27	W	January 26, 1930	7–3	New York Rangers (1929–30)	11–13–3
28	L	January 30, 1930	2–3	@ New York Americans (1929–30)	11–14–3

February

Game	Result	Date	Score	Opponent	Record
29	L	February 1, 1930	2–3	@ Pittsburgh Pirates (1929–30)	11–15–3
30	L	February 2, 1930	1–4	Chicago Black Hawks (1929–30)	11–16–3
31	L	February 4, 1930	1–3	@ Boston Bruins (1929–30)	11–17–3
32	T	February 6, 1930	1–1 OT	@ New York Rangers (1929–30)	11–17–4
33	W	February 9, 1930	8–1	Pittsburgh Pirates (1929–30)	12–17–4
34	L	February 13, 1930	3–6	Montreal Maroons (1929–30)	12–18–4
35	L	February 16, 1930	2–4	Boston Bruins (1929–30)	12–19–4
36	L	February 18, 1930	0–2	Montreal Canadiens (1929–30)	12–20–4
37	W	February 23, 1930	2–1	@ Chicago Black Hawks (1929–30)	13–20–4
38	T	February 27, 1930	3–3 OT	Ottawa Senators (1929–30)	13–20–5

March

Game	Result	Date	Score	Opponent	Record
39	T	March 2, 1930	2–2 OT	New York Rangers (1929–30)	13–20–6
40	L	March 6, 1930	0–1	New York Americans (1929–30)	13–21–6
41	L	March 8, 1930	2–3	@ Ottawa Senators (1929–30)	13–22–6
42	L	March 9, 1930	1–2	Toronto Maple Leafs (1929–30)	13–23–6
43	L	March 15, 1930	2–5	@ Boston Bruins (1929–30)	13–24–6
44	W	March 18, 1930	4–2	@ Pittsburgh Pirates (1929–30)	14–24–6

Legend: Win (2 points) Loss (0 points) Tie (1 point)

== Player statistics ==
=== Regular season ===
Scoring

Player	Pos	GP	G	A	Pts	PIM
Carson Cooper	RW	44	18	18	36	14
Ebbie Goodfellow	C/D	44	17	17	34	54
George Hay	LW	44	18	15	33	8
Herbie Lewis	LW	44	20	11	31	36
Larry Aurie	RW	43	14	5	19	28
Stan McCabe	LW	25	7	3	10	23
Reg Noble	C/D	43	6	4	10	72
Bob Connors	LW/D	31	3	7	10	42
Pete Bellefeuille	RW	24	5	2	7	10
Henry Hicks	D	30	3	2	5	35
Harvey Rockburn	D	36	4	0	4	97
Jimmy Herbert	C/RW	23	1	3	4	4
Bernie Brophy	LW	15	2	0	2	2
James Hughes	D	40	0	1	1	48
Joe Matte	D	12	0	1	1	0
Bill Beveridge	G	39	0	0	0	0
Dolly Dolson	G	5	0	0	0	0

Goaltending

Player	MIN	GP	W	L	T	GA	GAA	SO
Bill Beveridge	2410	39	14	20	5	109	2.71	2
Dolly Dolson	320	5	0	4	1	24	4.50	0
Team:	2730	44	14	24	6	133	2.92	2

Note: GP = Games played; G = Goals; A = Assists; Pts = Points; PIM = Penalty minutes; PPG = Power-play goals; SHG = Short-handed goals; GWG = Game-winning goals
MIN = Minutes played; W = Wins; L = Losses; T = Ties; GA = Goals against; GAA = Goals against average; SO = Shutouts;

== See also ==
- 1929–30 NHL season
