= 1929–30 Boston Bruins season =

NHL team season

1929–30 Boston Bruins
- American Division champions
- Division: 1st American
- 1929–30 record: 38–5–1
- Home record: 21–1–0
- Road record: 17–4–1
- Goals for: 179 (1st)
- Goals against: 98 (1st)

Team information
- General manager: Art Ross
- Coach: Art Ross
- Captain: Lionel Hitchman
- Arena: Boston Garden

Team leaders
- Goals: Cooney Weiland (43)
- Assists: Dutch Gainor (31)
- Points: Cooney Weiland (73)
- Penalty minutes: Eddie Shore (105)
- Wins: Tiny Thompson (38)
- Goals against average: Tiny Thompson (2.23)

The 1929–30 Boston Bruins season was the Bruins' sixth season in the NHL. In defending its American Division title for the second straight season, the Bruins took advantage of new rules and its powerhouse lineup to set three records including most wins in a single regular season (38), most regular season wins on home ice (20), and the best single season winning percentage in NHL history (0.875) – a record which still stands. However, the club failed to defend its Stanley Cup title, losing in the Stanley Cup Finals to the Montreal Canadiens.

== Regular season ==
To combat low scoring – the previous season had the fewest goals per game recorded before or thereafter – a major rule change was implemented. Players were now allowed forward passing in the offensive zone, instead of only in the defensive and neutral zones. This led to abuse: players sat in front of the opposing net waiting for a pass, and goals scored nearly tripled league-wide. The rule was changed again mid-season in December 1929, and players were no longer allowed to enter the offensive zone before the puck, thus giving birth to the modern offside rule.

In the meantime, however, Boston took advantage of the new rule from its opening match, defeating Detroit 5–2 before a sellout crowd behind Cooney Weiland's two goals. The team was noted in the press for its skill in dealing with the new infractions called for hanging back, recording many fewer penalties than the other teams in early season play.

After a rough match on November 23 against the Montreal Maroons, superstar defenseman Eddie Shore went to the hospital with multiple injuries, missing the return match against the Maroons on the 26th. Bruins' president Charles Adams presented Shore with a check for $500, purportedly $100 for each facial scar he received at the hands of the Maroons.

The Bruins went on a tear starting with a 3–2 win over Pittsburgh on November 30, winning fourteen straight games through to a January 9 4–3 win against Pittsburgh; this set a new league mark for consecutive wins that would last for 52 years until the New York Islanders broke it in 1982, and is still the third longest such streak in league history. The streak was broken by the New York Americans – the league's last place team at the time – on January 12. The Dynamite Line of Cooney Weiland, Dit Clapper and Dutch Gainor was responsible for most of the team's goals to that point, and by the halfway mark of the season, the Bruins had a 20–3 record, nearly twice as many wins as any other team in the league.

In another unusual incident involving Shore, well known for his fighting ability, the Bruins' defenseman was challenged to a boxing match by baseball player Art Shires. While NHL President Frank Calder said that Shore's participation was up to Bruins' manager Art Ross to decide, baseball commissioner Judge Kenesaw Mountain Landis vetoed Shires' participation, and the match was never held.

The Bruins had yet another streak (broken by a Chicago Black Hawks overtime win on March 13) of seventeen games without a defeat, tying the then-league record. By season's end, Weiland led the league in scoring (one goal shy of Joe Malone's 1918 record of 44), Dit Clapper had finished third, and Dutch Gainor ninth. The Dynamite Line scored 102 of the Bruins' league record 179 goals, as many as last-place Pittsburgh managed.

Among the many marks set by the Bruins in the 1930 season that remain NHL records was the fewest ties in an NHL season with 1; and the fewest losses in a season with 5. The Bruins also set a record with 38 regular season wins, a winning percentage of 0.875, and 20 consecutive home ice wins in a season.

The 1943–44 Montreal Canadiens and the 1944–45 Montreal Canadiens tied the Bruins' record for most wins in a season at 38. However, the record remained unbroken for 21 years until March 11, 1951, when the 1950–51 Detroit Red Wings notched their 39th victory in a much longer 70-game season. The record for consecutive wins at home stood for 82 years, being matched by the 1975–76 Philadelphia Flyers and finally surpassed on February 14, 2012, by the 2011–12 Detroit Red Wings. As of 2026, no team has ever broken the Bruins' single season winning percentage record of 0.875 or won 38 out of their first 44 games.

=== Final standings ===
American Division
	GP	W	L	T	GF	GA	PTS
**Boston Bruins**	44	38	5	1	179	98	**77**
**Chicago Black Hawks**	44	21	18	5	117	111	**47**
**New York Rangers**	44	17	17	10	136	143	**44**
Detroit Cougars	44	14	24	6	117	133	**34**
Pittsburgh Pirates	44	5	36	3	102	185	**13**

Note: GP = Games Played, W = Wins, L = Losses, T = Ties, Pts = Points, GF = Goals For, GA = Goals Against
Teams that qualified for the playoffs are highlighted in bold.

=== Record vs. opponents ===
==== Vs. American Division ====
1929–30 NHL records
Team	BOS	CHI	DET	NYR	PIT	Total
Boston	—	3–3	6–0	5–0–1	6–0	**20–3–1**
Chicago	3–3	—	2–3–1	1–3–2	6–0	**12–9–3**
Detroit	0–6	3–2–1	—	2–1–3	4–2	**9–11–4**
N.Y. Rangers	0–5–1	3–1–2	1–2–3	—	6–0	**10–8–6**
Pittsburgh	0–6	0–6	2–4	0–6	—	**2–22–0**

==== Vs. Canadian Division ====
1929–30 NHL records
Team	MTL	MTM	NYA	OTT	TOR	Total
Boston	4–0	3–1	3–1	4–0	4–0	**18–2–0**
Chicago	0–3–1	4–0	2–2	2–2	1–2–1	**9–9–2**
Detroit	1–3	1–2–1	1–3	0–3–1	2–2	**5–13–2**
N.Y. Rangers	1–2–1	2–2	2–2	2–0–2	0–3–1	**7–9–4**
Pittsburgh	0–2–2	0–4	1–2–1	1–3	1–3	**3–14–3**

== Schedule and results ==
1929–30 regular season
November

Game	Result	Date	Score	Opponent	Record
1	W	November 14, 1929	5–2	@ Detroit Cougars (1929–30)	1–0–0
2	W	November 16, 1929	6–5	@ Toronto Maple Leafs (1929–30)	2–0–0
3	W	November 19, 1929	3–2	New York Rangers (1929–30)	3–0–0
4	W	November 23, 1929	4–3	@ Montreal Maroons (1929–30)	4–0–0
5	L	November 26, 1929	1–6	Montreal Maroons (1929–30)	4–1–0
6	W	November 30, 1929	6–2	@ Pittsburgh Pirates (1929–30)	5–1–0

December

Game	Result	Date	Score	Opponent	Record
7	L	December 1, 1929	1–3	@ Chicago Black Hawks (1929–30)	5–2–0
8	W	December 3, 1929	3–1	Montreal Canadiens (1929–30)	6–2–0
9	W	December 7, 1929	2–1	Detroit Cougars (1929–30)	7–2–0
10	W	December 10, 1929	5–4	Pittsburgh Pirates (1929–30)	8–2–0
11	W	December 12, 1929	3–2	@ Ottawa Senators (1929–30)	9–2–0
12	W	December 15, 1929	8–4	@ New York Americans (1929–30)	10–2–0
13	W	December 17, 1929	6–2	Ottawa Senators (1929–30)	11–2–0
14	W	December 21, 1929	4–1	Chicago Black Hawks (1929–30)	12–2–0
15	W	December 25, 1929	6–2	Toronto Maple Leafs (1929–30)	13–2–0
16	W	December 26, 1929	4–2	@ New York Rangers (1929–30)	14–2–0
17	W	December 28, 1929	3–2	@ Montreal Canadiens (1929–30)	15–2–0

January

Game	Result	Date	Score	Opponent	Record
18	W	January 1, 1930	5–2	New York Americans (1929–30)	16–2–0
19	W	January 4, 1930	4–2	@ Montreal Maroons (1929–30)	17–2–0
20	W	January 7, 1930	3–0	New York Rangers (1929–30)	18–2–0
21	W	January 9, 1930	4–3	@ Pittsburgh Pirates (1929–30)	19–2–0
22	L	January 12, 1930	2–3	@ New York Americans (1929–30)	19–3–0
23	W	January 14, 1930	5–1	Ottawa Senators (1929–30)	20–3–0
24	L	January 16, 1930	1–2	@ Chicago Black Hawks (1929–30)	20–4–0
25	W	January 19, 1930	5–4	@ Detroit Cougars (1929–30)	21–4–0
26	W	January 21, 1930	5–1	Chicago Black Hawks (1929–30)	22–4–0
27	W	January 23, 1930	2–1 OT	New York Americans (1929–30)	23–4–0
28	W	January 25, 1930	2–1	@ Montreal Canadiens (1929–30)	24–4–0
29	W	January 28, 1930	6–0	Pittsburgh Pirates (1929–30)	25–4–0

February

Game	Result	Date	Score	Opponent	Record
30	T	February 2, 1930	3–3 OT	@ New York Rangers (1929–30)	25–4–1
31	W	February 4, 1930	3–1	Detroit Cougars (1929–30)	26–4–1
32	W	February 11, 1930	6–5 OT	Toronto Maple Leafs (1929–30)	27–4–1
33	W	February 12, 1930	4–3	@ Pittsburgh Pirates (1929–30)	28–4–1
34	W	February 15, 1930	5–3	@ Toronto Maple Leafs (1929–30)	29–4–1
35	W	February 16, 1930	4–2	@ Detroit Cougars (1929–30)	30–4–1
36	W	February 18, 1930	3–2	Montreal Maroons (1929–30)	31–4–1
37	W	February 23, 1930	3–2	@ New York Rangers (1929–30)	32–4–1
38	W	February 25, 1930	7–0	Pittsburgh Pirates (1929–30)	33–4–1

March

Game	Result	Date	Score	Opponent	Record
39	W	March 1, 1930	2–1	@ Ottawa Senators (1929–30)	34–4–1
40	W	March 4, 1930	5–2	Montreal Canadiens (1929–30)	35–4–1
41	W	March 11, 1930	4–3	Chicago Black Hawks (1929–30)	36–4–1
42	L	March 13, 1930	2–3 OT	@ Chicago Black Hawks (1929–30)	36–5–1
43	W	March 15, 1930	5–2	Detroit Cougars (1929–30)	37–5–1
44	W	March 18, 1930	9–2	New York Rangers (1929–30)	38–5–1

Legend: Win (2 points) Loss (0 points) Tie (1 point)

== Playoffs ==
As the American Division champions, Boston enjoyed a first round bye in the playoffs, and faced the Montreal Maroons, the Canadian Division champions, in the semifinals in a best-of-five series. The first game of the series was a grueling overtime match in which Bruins' coach Art Ross was noted for ceaseless criticism of the officiating and the ice condition, to the annoyance of the home crowd in Montreal, won on a Harry Oliver overtime goal at the 45 minute mark. The Bruins won the second match handily on two goals from Clapper, partially due to an injury forcing Montreal star Babe Siebert out only a few minutes into the game, but with Siebert's return in the third game the match was much closer. Unusually, Montreal starter Buck Boucher broke a leg 24 minutes into overtime, and his replacement, little-used defenseman Archie Wilcox, scored the game winner at the 26 minute mark. Siebert did not dress for the final game, and the Bruins overwhelmed the Maroons to reach the Cup finals, behind two goals from Marty Barry, earning the Bruins a rest while they waited for their next opponents.

The Bruins were heavily favored to retain the Stanley Cup, but were shocked in the first game of the best-of-three Finals by the play of Canadiens' goaltender George Hainsworth, who shut out the Bruins' powerful offense. In the second game, Montreal went out to a three-goal lead until Eddie Shore began a rally with a goal that spurred the Bruins to tie the match, before the Canadiens scored the final goal to win the Cup. It was the first time all season long the Bruins had lost two games in a row, and the stunning defeat of the regular season champions in such a short series spurred the league to change the Cup Finals to a best-of-five series for subsequent years.

1930 Stanley Cup playoffs
Semifinals vs. (C1) Montreal Maroons – Bruins win 3–1

Game	Date	Visitor	Score	Home	Series
1	March 20	Boston Bruins	2–1	Montreal Maroons	1–0
2	March 22	Boston Bruins	4–2	Montreal Maroons	2–0
3	March 25	Montreal Maroons	1–0	Boston Bruins	2–1
4	March 27	Montreal Maroons	1–5	Boston Bruins	3–1

Stanley Cup Finals vs. (C2) Montreal Canadiens – Canadiens win 2–0

Game	Date	Visitor	Score	Home	Series
1	April 1	Montreal Canadiens	3–0	Boston Bruins	0–1
2	April 3	Boston Bruins	3–4	Montreal Canadiens	0–2

Legend: Win Loss

== Player statistics ==
=== Regular season ===
Scoring

Player	Pos	GP	G	A	Pts	PIM
Cooney Weiland	C	44	43	30	73	27
Dit Clapper	RW/D	44	41	20	61	48
Dutch Gainor	C	42	18	31	49	39
Marty Barry	C	44	18	15	33	34
Eddie Shore	D	42	12	19	31	105
Harry Oliver	RW	40	16	5	21	12
Percy Galbraith	LW/D	44	7	9	16	38
George Owen	D	42	9	4	13	31
Bill Carson	C	44	7	4	11	24
Mickey MacKay	C	37	4	5	9	13
Lionel Hitchman	D	39	2	7	9	58
Bill Hutton	D/RW	16	2	0	2	2
Art Gagne	RW	6	0	1	1	6
Harry Connor	LW	13	0	0	0	4
Myles Lane	D	3	0	0	0	0
Bob Taylor	RW	8	0	0	0	6
Tiny Thompson	G	44	0	0	0	0

Goaltending

Player	MIN	GP	W	L	T	GA	GAA	SO
Tiny Thompson	2680	44	38	5	1	98	2.19	3
Team:	2680	44	38	5	1	98	2.19	3

=== Playoffs ===
Scoring

Player	Pos	GP	G	A	Pts	PIM
Marty Barry	C	6	3	3	6	14
Cooney Weiland	C	6	1	5	6	2
Dit Clapper	RW/D	6	4	0	4	4
Percy Galbraith	LW/D	6	1	3	4	8
Harry Oliver	RW	6	2	1	3	6
George Owen	D	6	0	2	2	6
Bill Carson	C	6	1	0	1	6
Lionel Hitchman	D	6	1	0	1	14
Eddie Shore	D	6	1	0	1	26
Harry Connor	LW	6	0	0	0	0
Dutch Gainor	C	3	0	0	0	0
Myles Lane	D	6	0	0	0	0
Mickey MacKay	C	6	0	0	0	4
Tiny Thompson	G	6	0	0	0	0

Goaltending

Player	MIN	GP	W	L	GA	GAA	SO
Tiny Thompson	432	6	3	3	12	1.67	0
Team:	432	6	3	3	12	1.67	0

Note:

Pos = Position;GP = Games played; G = Goals; A = Assists; Pts = Points; PIM = Penalty minutes; +/- = Plus/minus; PPG = Power-play goals; SHG = Short-handed goals; GWG = Game-winning goals
Pos = Position;GP = Games played; Min, TOI = Minutes played; W = Wins; L = Losses; T,T/OT = Ties; OTL = Overtime losses; GA = Goals-against; GAA = Goals-against average; SO = Shutouts; SA = Shots against; SV = Shots saved;SV% = Save percentage;

== Awards and records ==
- Highest single season winning percentage: .875 (still stands)
- Most wins: 38 (still a record for 50-game season and less)
- Fewest losses: 5 (still stands)
- Fewest ties: 1 (still stands)
- Longest consecutive game winning streak: 14 (currently third all time)
- Longest consecutive home game winning streak: 20 (second all time)
- Most goals: 179 (still a record for 50-game season and less)
- Most goals by a forward line: Dynamite Line, 102 (Weiland, Clapper, Gainor)
- Most points by a player: 73, Cooney Weiland
- Vezina Trophy (fewest goals allowed): Tiny Thompson
- NHL scoring leader: Cooney Weiland
- Prince of Wales Trophy: Boston Bruins

NB: Up through the 1930 season, the NHL did not select end-of-season All-Star Teams.

== Transactions ==
- Traded Bill Hutton and Art Gagne to Ottawa Senators for Harry Connor.

== See also ==
- 1929–30 NHL season
- List of Stanley Cup champions
