= Abbie Cox =

Canadian ice hockey player

- Born: July 16, 1902 London, Ontario, Canada
- Died: May 10, 1985 (aged 82)
- Height: 5 ft 6 in (168 cm)
- Weight: 140 lb (64 kg; 10 st 0 lb)
- Position: Goaltender
- Caught: Left
- Played for: Montreal Maroons; New York Americans; Detroit Red Wings; Montreal Canadiens
- Playing career: 1923–1937

Albert Edward "Abbie" Cox (July 16, 1902 – May 10, 1985) was a Canadian professional ice hockey goaltender. Cox played a total of five games in the National Hockey League for the Montreal Maroons, New York Americans, Detroit Red Wings and Montreal Canadiens between 1930 and 1936. The rest of his career, which lasted from 1923 to 1937, was spent in various minor leagues.

== Playing career ==
He was born in London, Ontario. Cox played junior hockey in Ottawa and Iroquois Falls, winning the Memorial Cup in 1923. Cox graduated to senior hockey in 1923, playing first with the New Haven Eagles and then the Boston Maples. Cox signed with the New York Hockey Club of the USAHA in 1925 but was ruled ineligible to play in amateur play and was suspended for the season. Cox became a professional in 1926 with the Springfield Indians, then an affiliate of the New York Rangers. Cox played two seasons with Springfield, then signed with the Montreal Maroons organization. He played one game with the Maroons in the 1929–30 season, but played mostly for the minor league Windsor Bulldogs. Cox would spend the rest of his career mainly in the minor leagues, but played occasional games in the NHL. He played two games in 1933–34 for the Detroit Red Wings, and one for the New York Americans. He played one game in the 1935–36 season for the Montreal Canadiens. Cox retired after the 1936–37 season. Cox continued in hockey as a linesman.

== Career statistics ==
=== Regular season and playoffs ===
			Regular season								Playoffs
Season	Team	League	GP	W	L	T	Min	GA	SO	GAA	GP	W	L	T	Min	GA	SO	GAA
1921–22	Ottawa Munitions	OCHL	12	4	7	2	720	42	1	3.50	2	0	2	0	120	11	0	5.50
1922–23	Iroquois Falls Papermakers	NOJHA	—	—	—	—	—	—	—	—	—	—	—	—	—	—	—	—
1923–24	New Haven Bears	USAHA	12	6	6	0	730	21	2	1.73	—	—	—	—	—	—	—	—
1924–25	Boston Maples	USAHA	21	6	15	0	995	58	0	2.21	—	—	—	—	—	—	—	—
1925–26	New York Knickerbockers	USAHA	—	—	—	—	—	—	—	—	—	—	—	—	—	—	—	—
1926–27	Springfield Indians	Can-Am	31	14	12	5	1950	51	6	1.57	6	3	1	2	360	6	2	1.00
1927–28	Springfield Indians	Can-Am	40	24	13	3	2450	71	12	1.74	4	2	2	0	240	7	1	1.75
1928–29	Windsor Bulldogs	Can Pro	34	22	9	3	2100	64	7	1.83	8	5	3	0	530	7	3	0.79
1929–30	Montreal Maroons	NHL	1	1	0	0	60	2	0	2.00	—	—	—	—	—	—	—	—
1929–30	Windsor Bulldogs	IHL	41	20	13	8	2440	89	3	2.19	—	—	—	—	—	—	—	—
1930–31	Windsor Bulldogs	IHL	1	0	0	1	70	4	0	3.43	—	—	—	—	—	—	—	—
1930–31	Detroit Olympics	IHL	39	19	11	9	2470	78	8	1.89	6	0	6	0	370	19	0	3.08
1931–32	Pittsburgh Yellowjackets	IHL	31	12	13	5	1930	84	5	2.61	—	—	—	—	—	—	—	—
1932–33	Detroit Olympics	IHL	13	—	—	—	780	51	2	3.92	—	—	—	—	—	—	—	—
1932–33	Windsor Bulldogs	IHL	2	2	0	0	120	2	0	1.00	—	—	—	—	—	—	—	—
1933–34	New York Americans	NHL	1	0	1	0	24	3	0	7.50	—	—	—	—	—	—	—	—
1933–34	Detroit Red Wings	NHL	2	0	0	1	109	5	0	2.75	—	—	—	—	—	—	—	—
1933–34	Detroit Olympics	IHL	38	—	—	—	2280	80	5	2.11	6	3	3	0	360	17	0	2.83
1934–35	Quebec Castors	Can-Am	43	19	18	6	2660	114	5	2.57	3	1	2	0	180	6	1	2.00
1935–36	Montreal Canadiens	NHL	1	0	0	1	70	1	0	0.86	—	—	—	—	—	—	—	—
1935–36	Philadelphia Ramblers	Can-Am	1	—	—	—	60	4	0	4.00	—	—	—	—	—	—	—	—
1935–36	Springfield Indians	Cam-Am	38	15	20	3	2320	129	6	3.34	—	—	—	—	—	—	—	—
1936–37	Kansas City Greyhounds	AHA	10	0	8	2	646	31	0	2.88	—	—	—	—	—	—	—	—
NHL totals			5	1	1	2	263	11	0	2.51	—	—	—	—	—	—	—	—
