= Mickey Murray =

Canadian ice hockey player

- Born: October 14, 1898; Peterborough, Ontario, Canada
- Died: March 21, 1978 (aged 79)
- Height: 5 ft 10 in (178 cm)
- Weight: 168 lb (76 kg; 12 st 0 lb)
- Position: Goaltender
- Caught: Right
- Played for: Montreal Canadiens
- Playing career: 1919–1939

Edward Kevin "Mickey" Murray (October 14, 1898 – March 21, 1978) was a Canadian ice hockey goaltender. He played one game in the National Hockey League with the Montreal Canadiens during the 1929–30 season. The rest of his career, which lasted from 1919 to 1939, was spent in the minor leagues.

== Career statistics ==
=== Regular season and playoffs ===
			Regular season								Playoffs
Season	Team	League	GP	W	L	T	Min	GA	SO	GAA	GP	W	L	T	Min	GA	SO	GAA
1916–17	Peterborough Juniors	OHA	3	2	1	0	180	15	0	5.00	2	0	2	0	120	21	0	10.50
1917–18	Peterborough Juniors	OHA	3	3	0	0	180	7	0	2.33	4	1	3	0	240	37	0	9.25
1919–20	Peterborough Seniors	OHA Sr	—	—	—	—	—	—	—	—	5	3	2	0	300	24	0	4.80
1920–21	Peterborough Seniors	OHA Sr	4	1	3	0	240	22	0	5.50	—	—	—	—	—	—	—	—
1922–23	North Toronto Rangers	OHA Sr	—	—	—	—	—	—	—	—	—	—	—	—	—	—	—	—
1923–24	North Toronto Rangers	OHA Sr	—	—	—	—	—	—	—	—	—	—	—	—	—	—	—	—
1924–25	Galt Terriers	OHA Sr	20	7	12	1	1200	48	1	2.48	2	0	1	1	120	8	0	4.00
1925–26	Galt Terriers	OHA Sr	20	14	4	2	1200	33	3	1.65	2	0	1	1	120	8	0	4.00
1926–27	Galt Terriers	OHA Sr	10	4	6	0	600	30	0	3.00	—	—	—	—	—	—	—	—
1927–28	Providence Reds	Can-Am	21	6	10	5	1310	42	1	1.92	—	—	—	—	—	—	—	—
1927–28	Philadelphia Arrows	Can-Am	3	1	2	0	200	4	1	1.20	—	—	—	—	—	—	—	—
1928–29	Providence Reds	Can-Am	40	18	12	0	2540	58	12	1.37	6	1	3	2	363	14	1	2.31
1929–30	Montreal Canadiens	NHL	1	0	1	0	60	4	0	4.00	—	—	—	—	—	—	—	—
1929–30	Providence Reds	Can-Am	39	23	11	5	2394	96	6	2.41	3	3	0	0	180	4	0	1.33
1930–31	Providence Reds	Can-Am	40	23	11	6	2470	96	4	2.33	2	1	1	0	142	7	0	2.96
1931–32	Philadelphia Arrows	Can-Am	38	13	20	5	2352	97	3	2.48	—	—	—	—	—	—	—	—
1933–34	St. Louis Flyers	AHA	48	26	18	4	3050	84	7	1.65	7	2	4	1	460	12	1	1.57
1934–35	St. Louis Flyers	AHA	46	29	14	3	2920	97	6	1.99	6	3	3	0	370	18	0	2.92
1935–36	St. Louis Flyers	AHA	47	27	16	4	2941	87	9	1.78	1	0	0	0	80	1	0	0.75
1936–37	Kansas City Greyhounds	AHA	36	21	13	2	2189	54	11	1.48	3	0	3	0	180	10	3	3.33
1937–38	Kansas City Greyhounds	AHA	48	21	22	5	3005	120	0	2.40	—	—	—	—	—	—	—	—
1938–39	St. Paul Saints	AHA	4	1	3	0	240	20	1	5.00	—	—	—	—	—	—	—	—
NHL totals			1	0	1	0	60	4	0	4.00	—	—	—	—	—	—	—	—

== See also ==
- List of players who played only one game in the NHL
