= Earl Miller (ice hockey) =

Canadian ice hockey player

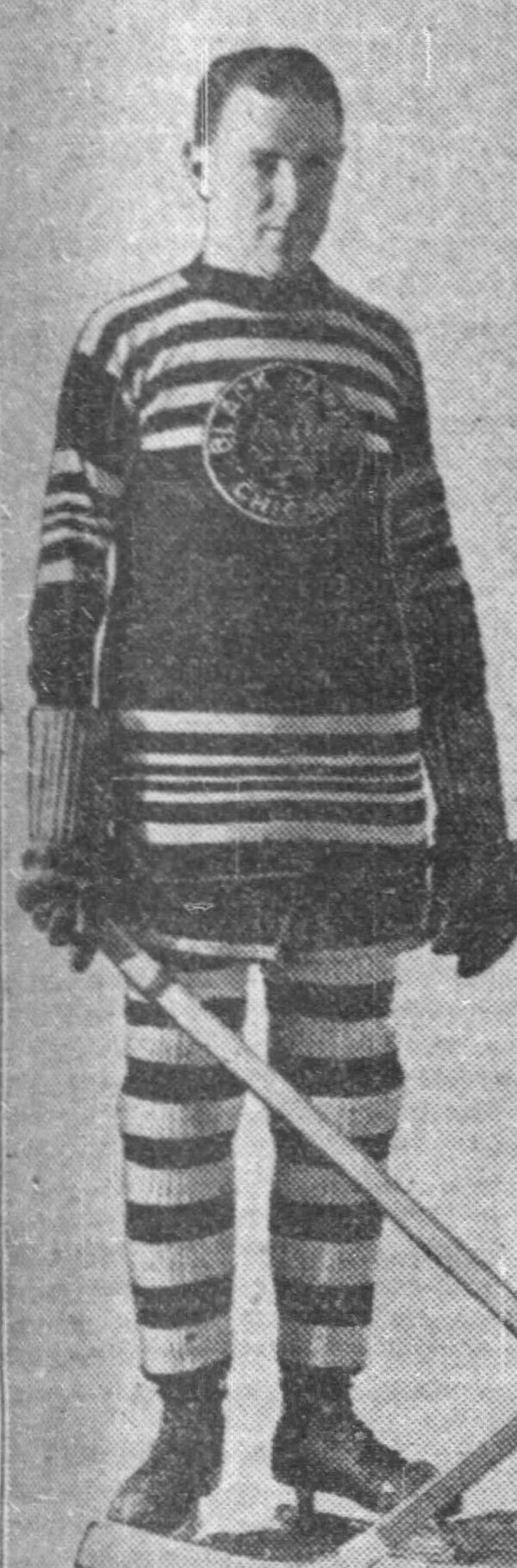
- Miller with the Black Hawks in 1928
- Born: September 12, 1905 Regina, Saskatchewan, Canada
- Died: June 20, 1936 (aged 30) Regina, Saskatchewan, Canada
- Height: 5 ft 11 in (180 cm)
- Weight: 180 lb (82 kg; 12 st 12 lb)
- Position: Left wing
- Shot: Left
- Played for: Chicago Black Hawks; Toronto Maple Leafs
- Playing career: 1926–1936

Ernest Earl Miller (September 12, 1905 – June 20, 1936) was a professional ice hockey player who played 110 games in the National Hockey League with the Chicago Black Hawks and Toronto Maple Leafs between 1927 and 1932. With Toronto Miller won the Stanley Cup in 1932. He was born in Regina, Saskatchewan. He is the uncle of Bill Hay.

== Playing career ==
A native of Lumsden, Saskatchewan, Miller played the position of Left Wing for teams in the NHL, IHL, Can-Pro, PRHL, N-SJHL, and the N-SSHL hockey leagues. Miller played for the Saskatoon Nutana from 1923 to 1924, University of Saskatchewan from 1924 to 1926, Saskatoon Sheiks from 1926 to 1928, Chicago Blackhawks from 1927 to 1932, Kitchener Flying Dutchmen from 1928 to 1931, London Tecumsehs from 1930 to 1931, Pittsburgh Yellowjackets from 1931 to 1932, Toronto Maple Leafs from 1931 to 1932, Syracuse Stars from 1932 to 1935, Buffalo Bisons from 1934 to 1936, and the Rochester Cardinals from 1935 to 1936. Miller retired from playing hockey in 1936. On June 20, 1936, Miller was found dead in a field in Regina, Saskatchewan, at the age of 30. No foul play was involved but no exact cause of death was ever released.

== Career statistics ==
=== Regular season and playoffs ===
			Regular season					Playoffs
Season	Team	League	GP	G	A	Pts	PIM	GP	G	A	Pts	PIM
1923–24	Saskatoon Nutana	N-SJHL	—	—	—	—	—	—	—	—	—	—
1924–25	University of Saskatchewan	N-SSHL	5	0	0	0	2	—	—	—	—	—
1925–26	University of Saskatchewan	N-SSHL	1	0	1	1	0	—	—	—	—	—
1926–27	Saskatoon Sheiks	PHL	20	4	2	6	14	4	3	1	4	2
1927–28	Chicago Black Hawks	NHL	22	1	1	2	34	—	—	—	—	—
1927–28	Saskatoon Sheiks	PHL	12	5	4	9	32	—	—	—	—	—
1928–29	Chicago Black Hawks	NHL	17	1	1	2	28	—	—	—	—	—
1928–29	Kitchener Flying Dutchmen	Can-Pro	22	9	6	15	75	—	—	—	—	—
1929–30	Chicago Black Hawks	NHL	28	11	5	16	50	2	1	0	1	6
1930–31	Chicago Black Hawks	NHL	19	3	4	7	10	1	0	0	0	0
1930–31	London Tecumsehs	IHL	4	0	3	3	4	—	—	—	—	—
1931–32	Chicago Black Hawks	NHL	8	0	0	0	0	—	—	—	—	—
1931–32	Toronto Maple Leafs	NHL	16	3	3	6	8	7	0	0	0	0
1931–32	Pittsburgh Yellow Jackets	IHL	22	3	2	5	14	—	—	—	—	—
1932–33	Syracuse Stars	IHL	44	19	15	34	26	6	4	0	4	6
1933–34	Syracuse Stars	IHL	43	21	19	40	54	6	1	3	4	14
1934–35	Syracuse Stars	IHL	19	5	7	12	21	—	—	—	—	—
1934–35	Buffalo Bisons	IHL	20	2	2	4	18	—	—	—	—	—
1935–36	Buffalo Bisons	IHL	12	0	0	0	0	—	—	—	—	—
1935–36	Rochester Cardinals	IHL	5	0	3	3	4	—	—	—	—	—
IHL totals			169	50	51	101	141	12	5	3	8	20
NHL totals			110	19	14	33	130	10	1	0	1	6

== See also ==
- List of ice hockey players who died during their playing career
