= 1927 Memorial Cup =

Canadian junior ice hockey championship

The Memorial Cup trophy

The 1927 Memorial Cup final was the ninth junior ice hockey championship of the Canadian Amateur Hockey Association. The George Richardson Memorial Trophy champions Owen Sound Greys of the Ontario Hockey Association in Eastern Canada competed against the Abbott Cup champions Port Arthur West Ends of the Thunder Bay Junior Hockey League in Western Canada. The series was the first to feature two Ontario-based teams. Teams from Port Arthur and Fort William (later amalgamated into Thunder Bay), competed with geographically closer western teams, rather than eastern teams.

In a best-of-three series, held at the Arena Gardens in Toronto, Ontario, Owen Sound won their second Memorial Cup, defeating Port Arthur 2 games to none.

== Background ==
Port Arthur had defeated the Regina Pats for the Western Canadian championship, while Owen Sound defeated a team from Iroquois Falls for the Eastern Canadian title.

== Scores ==
Game one was played on March 25, 1927, and was won 5-4 by Owen Sound. Game two was held on March 28, and with a 5-3 win Owen Sound secured the Memorial Cup.

== Winning roster ==
Red Beattie, Benny Grant, John Grant, Martin Lauder, Shrimp McDougall, Jack Markle, Alvin Moore, Paddy Paddon, H. Smith. Manager: A. Bennett, Coaches: Bill Hancock and Father J. Spratt
