= Benny Grant =

Canadian ice hockey player

- Born: July 14, 1908; Owen Sound, Ontario, Canada
- Died: July 30, 1991 (aged 83)
- Height: 5 ft 11 in (180 cm)
- Weight: 160 lb (73 kg; 11 st 6 lb)
- Position: Goaltender
- Caught: Left
- Played for: Toronto Maple Leafs; New York Americans; Boston Bruins
- Playing career: 1928–1944

Benjamin Cameron Grant (July 14, 1908 – July 30, 1991) was a Canadian professional ice hockey goalie who played 53 games in the National Hockey League for the New York Americans, Toronto Maple Leafs, and Boston Bruins between 1928 and 1944. The rest of his career was spent in various minor leagues. Benny Grant was a junior star with the hometown Owen Sound Greys of the OHA, with whom he won the 1927 Memorial Cup.

Grant found his niche in the newly created American Hockey League in 1936-37 where he starred for the Springfield Indians. In 1940-41 he moved on to the St. Paul Saints of the AHA and was named to the league's first all-star team after posting a 1.94 goals against average the next year. After sitting out the 1942-43 season he returned to play 20 games for the Maple Leafs who were dealing with the loss of Turk Broda to military service. Benny was in net for five games with the 1931-1932 Stanley Cup winning Toronto Maple Leafs.

== Career statistics ==
=== Regular season and playoffs ===
			Regular season								Playoffs
Season	Team	League	GP	W	L	T	Min	GA	SO	GAA	GP	W	L	T	Min	GA	SO	GAA
1924–25	Owen Sound Greys	OHA	1	0	0	0	20	0	0	0.00	—	—	—	—	—	—	—	—
1925–26	Owen Sound Greys	OHA	3	2	1	0	150	4	1	1.60	—	—	—	—	—	—	—	—
1926–27	Owen Sound Greys	OHA	16	12	3	1	960	35	2	2.19	—	—	—	—	—	—	—	—
1927–28	London Panthers	Can-Pro	6	1	4	1	249	24	0	5.78	—	—	—	—	—	—	—	—
1928–29	Toronto Maple Leafs	NHL	5	2	1	2	186	5	1	1.61	—	—	—	—	—	—	—	—
1929–30	Toronto Maple Leafs	NHL	3	1	1	0	150	14	0	5.60	—	—	—	—	—	—	—	—
1929–30	New York Americans	NHL	7	3	4	0	420	25	0	3.57	—	—	—	—	—	—	—	—
1929–30	Minneapolis Millers	AHA	21	—	—	—	1260	36	3	1.71	—	—	—	—	—	—	—	—
1930–31	Toronto Maple Leafs	NHL	7	1	5	1	430	19	2	2.65	—	—	—	—	—	—	—	—
1930–31	Boston Tigers	Can-Am	26	10	12	4	1609	69	1	2.57	9	3	4	2	712	23	0	1.94
1931–32	Toronto Maple Leafs	NHL	5	2	2	1	319	18	0	3.39	—	—	—	—	—	—	—	—
1931–32	Syracuse Stars	IHL	27	11	12	4	1700	66	4	2.33	—	—	—	—	—	—	—	—
1932–33	Syracuse Stars	IHL	44	23	15	6	2640	119	2	2.70	6	2	3	1	360	10	0	1.67
1933–34	New York Americans	NHL	5	1	3	1	320	18	1	3.38	—	—	—	—	—	—	—	—
1934–35	Boston Cubs	Can-Am	10	5	3	1	590	20	1	2.03	—	—	—	—	—	—	—	—
1934–35	Philadelphia Arrows	Can-Am	32	10	21	1	1930	114	1	3.54	—	—	—	—	—	—	—	—
1935–36	New Haven Eagles	Can-Am	28	11	15	2	1740	93	2	3.21	—	—	—	—	—	—	—	—
1935–36	Springfield Indians	Can-Am	8	6	1	1	490	14	3	1.71	3	0	2	1	180	9	0	3.00
1936–37	Springfield Indians	IAHL	50	23	18	9	3090	125	7	2.43	5	2	3	0	300	14	1	2.60
1937–38	Springfield Indians	IAHL	45	9	28	7	2790	174	3	3.20	—	—	—	—	—	—	—	—
1938–39	Springfield Indians	IAHL	52	15	28	9	3240	174	5	3.22	3	1	2	0	180	7	1	2.33
1939–40	Springfield Indians	IAHL	54	24	24	6	3330	149	3	2.68	3	1	2	0	180	10	0	3.33
1940–41	St. Paul Saints	AHA	48	25	23	0	2991	116	7	2.33	4	1	3	0	262	10	0	2.29
1941–42	St. Paul Saints	AHA	50	28	17	5	3060	99	10	1.94	2	0	2	0	120	7	0	3.50
1943–44	Toronto Maple Leafs	NHL	20	9	9	2	1200	83	0	4.15	—	—	—	—	—	—	—	—
1943–44	Boston Bruins	NHL	1	0	1	0	60	10	0	10.00	—	—	—	—	—	—	—	—
NHL totals			53	85	114	11	12923	594	19	2.76	—	—	—	—	—	—	—	—
