= 1929–30 Chicago Black Hawks season =

NHL ice hockey team season

1929–30 Chicago Black Hawks
- Division: 2nd American
- 1929–30 record: 21–18–5
- Home record: 12–9–1
- Road record: 9–9–4
- Goals for: 117
- Goals against: 111

Team information
- General manager: Frederic McLaughlin
- Coach: Tom Shaughnessy (10–8–3); Bill Tobin (11–10–2)
- Captain: Duke Dutkowski
- Arena: Chicago Coliseum (Nov–Dec); Chicago Stadium (Dec–Mar)

Team leaders
- Goals: Johnny Gottselig (21)
- Assists: Tom Cook (16)
- Points: Tom Cook (30)
- Penalty minutes: Art Somers (74)
- Wins: Chuck Gardiner (21)
- Goals against average: Chuck Gardiner (2.42)

The 1929–30 Chicago Black Hawks season was the team's fourth season in the NHL. After a two-year absence, the Hawks would return to the playoffs, losing to the Montreal Canadiens in the first round of the playoffs.

== Regular season ==
They were coming in their second straight season of winning only 7 games, and finishing in last place in the league. The Black Hawks would make yet another coaching change, hiring Tom Shaughnessy. The Hawks would surprise the league, getting off to a 10–8–3 start: however, the team would fire Shaughnessy and replace him with Bill Tobin. Tobin would lead Chicago to a record of 11–10–2, and they would finish the year with a 21–18–5 record, tripling their win total from the previous season, to finish in second place in the American Division, and make the playoffs for the second time in team history. The Black Hawks would set team records for wins, points and goals scored, and finish above .500 for the first time in team history.

The Black Hawks moved from the Chicago Coliseum to the new Chicago Stadium after Paddy Harmon was removed from the presidency of the Stadium in November 1929. Harmon had not been able to negotiate a deal with the Black Hawks, but within weeks of his ouster, the Stadium's board of directors agreed to the Black Hawks' terms of US$4,500 (equivalent to $84,375 in 2025) per night and a guaranteed Sunday afternoon slot. The gate receipts for the Black Hawks increased to nearly triple the previous season's receipts. The team grossed US$282,350 (equivalent to $5,441,706 in 2025) and attendance jumped to 186,920.

Chicago was led offensively by young players Tom Cook, who at 22, led the club with 30 points, and Johnny Gottselig, at 23 years old, leading the Black Hawks with 21 goals. Team captain Duke Dutkowski would lead all Black Hawk defensemen with 17 points in 44 games.

In goal, Chuck Gardiner would once again get all the playing time, setting a Black Hawks team record with 21 wins, and have 3 shutouts, along with a 2.42 GAA.

=== November ===
The Black Hawks opened the 1929–30 season on the road in Toronto on November 14, as the Black Hawks and Toronto Maple Leafs fought to a 2–2 tie. The Black Hawks hosted the Montreal Canadiens two nights later, on November 16, in their home opener, in which the two teams battled to a 4–4 draw in the Hawks' first game at Chicago Stadium. Mush March scored the first goal in the new arena. The Hawks would record their first win of the season on the road as they defeated the New York Americans 5–1.

Chicago returned home to face the Ottawa Senators on November 21. The Hawks Art Somers recorded a hat trick, as he scored three goals against the Senators, however, Ottawa held on to defeat the Hawks 6–5 in overtime. Three nights later, the Hawks would record their first win at their new arena, as Chuck Gardiner stopped every shot he faced, leading Chicago to a 4–0 win over the Detroit Cougars. The Hawks would lose their final game of November, dropping a 3–2 decision to the New York Rangers.

Chicago finished November with a 2–2–2 record in six games, earning six points. The club was in third place in the American Division, four points behind the first place Boston Bruins.

=== December ===
The Black Hawks opened December with a game against the first place Boston Bruins, and Chicago defeated Boston 3–1 after a very solid performance by Chuck Gardiner. Chicago would open the month of December with five consecutive victories, including a 4–2 win over the New York Americans on December 8 in which Earl Miller recorded a hat trick.

The Hawks winning streak was snapped on December 19, as the Detroit Cougars defeated Chicago 4–3. This led to the beginning of a three-game losing skid for the club. The Black Hawks stopped the losing streak with a solid 3–1 win over the Ottawa Senators on Christmas Eve, and followed it up with a 4–3 win against the Montreal Maroons two nights later. The Hawks ended the month with a 4–3 loss to the Toronto Maple Leafs on December 29.

The Black Hawks earned a 7–4–0 record during the month of December. This brought their overall win–loss record to 9–6–2 in the season, earning 20 points and tied with the New York Rangers for second place in the American Division, ten points behind the first place Boston Bruins.

=== January ===
Chicago opened the 1930s with an overtime loss by the score of 3–2 to the Montreal Canadiens on New Year's Day on home ice. The Hawks losing skid extended to three games, as the Detroit Cougars shutout the Hawks 4–0 in Chicago. In the back end of the home-and-home series, the Black Hawks ended their losing streak, as they tied the Cougars 1–1 in Detroit.

The Black Hawks then returned home for a three-game home stand, and Chicago would go a perfect 3–0–0 in these games, highlighted by a huge 2–1 victory over the first place Boston Bruins on January 16. The Hawks ended January with five games on the road, in which Chicago earned a record of 2–3–0 in those games, earning wins over the Pittsburgh Pirates and Ottawa Senators.

The club earned a 5–5–1 record during January. The Black Hawks overall record at the end of January was 14–11–3, earning 31 points, and in third place. Chicago was one point behind the New York Rangers for second place, but fell to nineteen points behind the division leading Boston Bruins.

=== February ===
The Black Hawks seven game road trip continued with a 6–0 loss to the Toronto Maple Leafs on February 1, which was the second consecutive game that the team was shutout, as they lost to the Montreal Canadiens 1–0 in overtime on January 30. In the final game of the road trip, Chicago returned to the win column, as they beat the Detroit Cougars 4–1.

The Hawks then began a five-game home stand, and started it off with a 3–2 win over the Montreal Maroons. Chicago would then lose the next four games of the home stand, dropping their overall record to .500 at 16–16–3.

Chicago finished off February on a quick two game road trip, in which they ended their four-game slide with a 2–0 win over the Montreal Maroons, followed by a 1–1 draw against the New York Rangers.

The Black Hawks slumped to a 3–5–1 record in February, which was their first losing month of the season. Chicago's overall record at the end of the month was 17–16–4, earning 38 points and in a tie for second place with the New York Rangers. The Hawks were out of the running for first place though, as the Boston Bruins were 29 points ahead of Chicago.

=== March ===
The Black Hawks started off March back at home with a 3–0 shutout victory over the Pittsburgh Pirates, extending their unbeaten streak to three games. The New York Rangers and Black Hawks fought to a 1–1 tie Chicago's next game.

The club went on their final road trip of the season, and started it off with a 4–3 win against the Pirates on March 8, extending their unbeaten streak to five games. The Hawks streak was snapped the following night, as the New York Americans beat Chicago 5–2. The road trip concluded with a close 4–3 loss to the Boston Bruins.

The Hawks returned home for their final two games, and defeated the Boston Bruins for the third time in the season, as Johnny Gottselig scored the overtime winner in a 3–2 win over Boston. The Black Hawks earned a 3–3–0 record against Boston during the season, an impressive feat, as Boston finished the season with a 38–5–1 record, losing only two other games throughout the year. The regular season concluded on March 18, as Chicago defeated the Toronto Maple Leafs 4–1.

Chicago had a very solid 4–2–1 record in the month of March, which brought their final regular season record to 21–18–5, earning 56 points, which was a club record. Chicago finished the season in second place in the American Division.

=== Season standings ===
American Division
	GP	W	L	T	GF	GA	PTS
**Boston Bruins**	44	38	5	1	179	98	**77**
**Chicago Black Hawks**	44	21	18	5	117	111	**47**
**New York Rangers**	44	17	17	10	136	143	**44**
Detroit Cougars	44	14	24	6	117	133	**34**
Pittsburgh Pirates	44	5	36	3	102	185	**13**

Note: GP = Games Played, W = Wins, L = Losses, T = Ties, Pts = Points, GF = Goals For, GA = Goals Against
Teams that qualified for the playoffs are highlighted in bold.

=== Record vs. opponents ===
==== Vs. American Division ====
1929–30 NHL records
Team	**BOS**	**CHI**	**DET**	**NYR**	**PIT**	**Total**
Boston	—	3–3	6–0	5–0–1	6–0	**20–3–1**
Chicago	3–3	—	2–3–1	1–3–2	6–0	**12–9–3**
Detroit	0–6	3–2–1	—	2–1–3	4–2	**9–11–4**
N.Y. Rangers	0–5–1	3–1–2	1–2–3	—	6–0	**10–8–6**
Pittsburgh	0–6	0–6	2–4	0–6	—	**2–22–0**

==== Vs. Canadian Division ====
1929–30 NHL records
Team	**MTL**	**MTM**	**NYA**	**OTT**	**TOR**	**Total**
Boston	4–0	3–1	3–1	4–0	4–0	**18–2–0**
Chicago	0–3–1	4–0	2–2	2–2	1–2–1	**9–9–2**
Detroit	1–3	1–2–1	1–3	0–3–1	2–2	**5–13–2**
N.Y. Rangers	1–2–1	2–2	2–2	2–0–2	0–3–1	**7–9–4**
Pittsburgh	0–2–2	0–4	1–2–1	1–3	1–3	**3–14–3**

== Schedule and results ==
1929–30 regular season
November

Game	Date	Visitor	Score	Home	Record	Points
1	November 14	Chicago Black Hawks	2–2	Toronto Maple Leafs	0–0–1	1
2	November 16	Chicago Black Hawks	4–4	Montreal Canadiens	0–0–2	2
3	November 19	Chicago Black Hawks	5–1	New York Americans	1–0–2	4
4	November 21	Ottawa Senators	6–5	Chicago Black Hawks	1–1–2	4
5	November 24	Detroit Cougars	0–4	Chicago Black Hawks	2–1–2	6
6	November 28	New York Rangers	3–2	Chicago Black Hawks	2–2–2	6

December

Game	Date	Visitor	Score	Home	Record	Points
7	December 1	Boston Bruins	1–3	Chicago Black Hawks	3–2–2	8
8	December 5	Chicago Black Hawks	5–2	Pittsburgh Pirates	4–2–2	10
9	December 8	New York Americans	2–4	Chicago Black Hawks	5–2–2	12
10	December 12	Montreal Maroons	3–4	Chicago Black Hawks	6–2–2	14
11	December 15	Pittsburgh Pirates	1–3	Chicago Black Hawks	7–2–2	16
12	December 19	Chicago Black Hawks	3–4	Detroit Cougars	7–3–2	16
13	December 21	Chicago Black Hawks	1–4	Boston Bruins	7–4–2	16
14	December 22	Chicago Black Hawks	1–3	New York Rangers	7–5–2	16
15	December 24	Chicago Black Hawks	3–1	Ottawa Senators	8–5–2	18
16	December 26	Chicago Black Hawks	4–3	Montreal Maroons	9–5–2	20
17	December 29	Toronto Maple Leafs	4–3	Chicago Black Hawks	9–6–2	20

January

Game	Date	Visitor	Score	Home	Record	Points
18	January 1	Montreal Canadiens	3–2	Chicago Black Hawks	9–7–2	20
19	January 5	Detroit Cougars	4–0	Chicago Black Hawks	9–8–2	20
20	January 9	Chicago Black Hawks	1–1	Detroit Cougars	9–8–3	21
21	January 12	New York Rangers	1–2	Chicago Black Hawks	10–8–3	23
22	January 14	Pittsburgh Pirates	2–6	Chicago Black Hawks	11–8–3	25
23	January 16	Boston Bruins	1–2	Chicago Black Hawks	12–8–3	27
24	January 19	Chicago Black Hawks	1–4	New York Rangers	12–9–3	27
25	January 21	Chicago Black Hawks	1–5	Boston Bruins	12–10–3	27
26^{A}	January 25	Chicago Black Hawks	5–2	Pittsburgh Pirates	13–10–3	29
27	January 28	Chicago Black Hawks	2–1	Ottawa Senators	14–10–3	31
28	January 30	Chicago Black Hawks	0–1	Montreal Canadiens	14–11–3	31
Notes: A – played at Atlantic City, New Jersey.

February

Game	Date	Visitor	Score	Home	Record	Points
29	February 1	Chicago Black Hawks	0–6	Toronto Maple Leafs	14–12–3	31
30	February 2	Chicago Black Hawks	4–1	Detroit Cougars	15–12–3	33
31	February 6	Montreal Maroons	2–3	Chicago Black Hawks	16–12–3	35
32	February 16	Montreal Canadiens	2–1	Chicago Black Hawks	16–13–3	35
33	February 18	New York Americans	6–4	Chicago Black Hawks	16–14–3	35
34	February 20	Ottawa Senators	5–2	Chicago Black Hawks	16–15–3	35
35	February 23	Detroit Cougars	2–1	Chicago Black Hawks	16–16–3	35
36	February 25	Chicago Black Hawks	2–0	Montreal Maroons	17–16–3	37
37	February 27	Chicago Black Hawks	1–1	New York Rangers	17–16–4	38

March

Game	Date	Visitor	Score	Home	Record	Points
38	March 2	Pittsburgh Pirates	0–3	Chicago Black Hawks	18–16–4	40
39	March 4	New York Rangers	2–2	Chicago Black Hawks	18–16–5	41
40^{B}	March 8	Chicago Black Hawks	4–3	Pittsburgh Pirates	19–16–5	43
41	March 9	Chicago Black Hawks	2–5	New York Americans	19–17–5	43
42	March 11	Chicago Black Hawks	3–4	Boston Bruins	19–18–5	43
43	March 13	Boston Bruins	2–3	Chicago Black Hawks	20–18–5	45
44	March 18	Toronto Maple Leafs	1–4	Chicago Black Hawks	21–18–5	47
Notes: B – played at Peace Bridge, Buffalo, New York.

Legend: Win (2 points) Loss (0 points) Tie (1 point)

== Playoffs ==
After a two-year absence, the Hawks would return to the playoffs, and face the second place team from the Canadian Division, the Montreal Canadiens, in the opening round in a two-game, total goal series.

The series opened at Chicago Stadium, however, despite a solid 38 save effort by goaltender Charlie Gardiner, the Canadiens defeated the Black Hawks 1–0 on a third period goal by Newsy Lalonde. Canadiens goaltender George Hainsworth made 34 saves for the win.

The second game moved to the Montreal Forum, as the Black Hawks were in a must-win situation. The Hawks Ty Arbour opened the scoring with the lone goal of the first period, scoring 1:38 into the game. Montreal tied the game midway through the second period on a power play goal by Howie Morenz. The Black Hawks Earl Miller restored the lead for Chicago just over three minutes later, as the Hawks led 2–1 after the second period. In the third period, the two teams did not score a goal, as the two-game total goal series ended in a 2–2 tie, forcing overtime. It wouldn't be until the third overtime period before a goal was scored, as Howie Morenz beat Charlie Gardiner midway through the third overtime period, as Montreal won the series by a 3–2 score.

=== Canadiens 3, Black Hawks 2 ===
==== NHL quarter-finals ====
===== (C2) Montreal Canadiens vs. (A3) Chicago Black Hawks =====
March 23	Montreal Canadiens	1 – 0	Chicago Black Hawks	Chicago Stadium	Recap
No scoring		First period	No scoring
No scoring		Second period	No scoring
Larochelle (1) – (Leduc, Lépine) – 7:40		Third period	No scoring
Hainsworth (1-0-0)		Goalie stats	Gardiner (0-1-0)

March 26	Chicago Black Hawks	2 – 2	3OT	Montreal Canadiens	Montreal Forum	Recap
Arbour (1) – (Unassisted) – 1:38		First period		No scoring
Miller (1) – (Cook) – 12:49		Second period		9:20 – Morenz (1) – (Unassisted)
No scoring		Third period		No scoring
No scoring		Third overtime period		11:53 – Morenz (2) – (Unassisted)
Gardiner (0-1-1)		Goalie stats		Hainsworth (1-0-1)

Montreal wins series 3 – 2

== Player statistics ==
=== Scoring leaders ===
Player	GP	G	A	Pts	PIM
Tom Cook	41	14	16	30	16
Johnny Gottselig	39	21	4	25	28
Art Somers	44	11	13	24	74
Ty Arbour	44	10	8	18	26
Duke Dutkowski	44	7	10	17	42

=== Goaltending ===
Player	GP	TOI	W	L	T	GA	SO	GAA
Chuck Gardiner	44	2750	21	18	5	111	3	2.42

== Playoff stats ==
=== Scoring leaders ===
Player	GP	G	A	Pts	PIM
Ty Arbour	2	1	0	1	0
Earl Miller	2	1	0	1	7
Tom Cook	2	0	1	1	4

=== Goaltending ===
Player	GP	TOI	W	L	T	GA	SO	GAA
Chuck Gardiner	2	172	0	1	1	3	0	1.05
