= 1929–30 NHL season =

Professional ice hockey league season

- League: National Hockey League
- Sport: Ice hockey
- Duration: November 14, 1929 – April 3, 1930
- Games: 44
- Teams: 10

Regular season
- Season champions: Boston Bruins
- Season MVP: Nels Stewart (Maroons)
- Top scorer: Cooney Weiland (Bruins)
- Canadian Division champions: Montreal Maroons
- American Division champions: Boston Bruins

Stanley Cup
- Champions: Montreal Canadiens
- Runners-up: Boston Bruins

NHL seasons
- ← 1928–29 1930–31 →

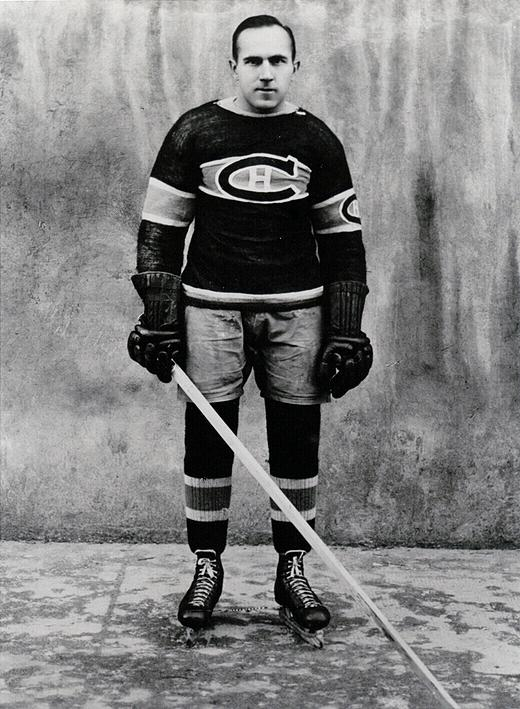
Howie Morenz, Montreal Canadien (1930)

The 1929–30 NHL season was the 13th season of the National Hockey League. Ten teams played 44 games each. The Montreal Canadiens upset the heavily favoured Boston Bruins two games to none in the Stanley Cup Finals.

== League business ==
The league instituted in the new rules the standard dimensions for ice hockey rinks, that of 200 feet (61 m) × 85 feet (26 m). The already-built Boston Garden 191 feet (58 m) × 88 feet (27 m) and the Chicago Stadium 188 feet (57 m) × 85 feet (26 m), which were smaller, were exempt from the new rule.

To combat low scoring, the off-side rules were rewritten. Players were now allowed forward passing in the offensive zone, instead of only in the defensive and neutral zones. Players were now allowed to enter the offensive zone before the puck. The only off-side rule left was that passing was not allowed from one zone to another. The changes led to abuse: players sat in front of the opposing net waiting for a pass. It was joked that players like the Maroons' Nels Stewart and the Bruins' Cooney Weiland were "setting up 'light housekeeping' at the opposition goal crease." The rule was changed in mid-season and players were no longer allowed to enter the offensive zone before the puck.

== Arena changes ==
The Chicago Black Hawks moved from the Chicago Coliseum to the Chicago Stadium in December 1929 after Paddy Harmon was removed from the presidency of the Stadium in November. Harmon had not been able to negotiate a deal with the Black Hawks, but within weeks of his ouster the Stadium's board of directors agreed to the Black Hawks' terms of US$4,500 (equivalent to $84,375 in 2025) per night and a guaranteed Sunday afternoon slot. The gate receipts for the Black Hawks increased to nearly triple the previous season's receipts. The team grossed US$282,350 (equivalent to $5,441,706 in 2025) and attendance jumped to 186,920.

== Regular season ==
Cooney Weiland of the Boston Bruins took advantage of the rule changes and smashed the old NHL scoring record with 73 points. Weiland and Tiny Thompson, who won the Vezina Trophy with a 2.23 goals against average, led the Bruins to a final season standings record of 38 wins, 5 losses, and 1 tie. The Bruins set three impressive NHL records including most wins in the regular season (38), highest winning percentage (0.875), and most consecutive home ice wins (20).

The 1943–44 Montreal Canadiens and the 1944–45 Montreal Canadiens would tie the record for most wins in a season at 38. But the record remained unbroken for 21 years until March 11, 1951, when the 1950–51 Detroit Red Wings notched their 39th victory in a much longer 70-game season. The record for consecutive wins at home would stand for 82 years, being matched by the 1975–76 Philadelphia Flyers and finally surpassed on February 14, 2012, by the 2011–12 Detroit Red Wings. As of 2026 no team has ever won 38 of their first 44 games or broken the Bruins' single season winning percentage record of 0.875.

Conn Smythe brought up two outstanding forwards, Harvey "Busher" Jackson, and Charlie Conacher, and combined with Joe Primeau, the Kid Line was born. Conacher actually scored on his first shift in the NHL. Jackson got his nickname Busher from Tim Daly, the Toronto trainer, when asked by Daly to assist with some sticks. "I'm a hockey player, not a stickboy", Jackson told Daly, who replied, "Why you fresh young busher!" And it was Busher Jackson from that day on.

On January 7, 1930, Clint Benedict became the first goalie in NHL history to don a protective face mask. He did so for five games to protect a broken nose. The next time a mask made its way into the NHL was almost 30 years later when Jacques Plante wore one in a game on November 1, 1959.

Frank Frederickson badly injured his knee and the Pittsburgh Pirates fortunes went from bad to worse.

Eddie Gerard resigned as manager-coach of the Montreal Maroons. He was replaced as manager by team president James Strachan. Dunc Munro was hired as coach and led the team to first place in the Canadian Division.

There was a well-founded rumour that Gerard would take the coaching reins of Ottawa from Newsy Lalonde when Lalonde was not well. Dave Gill filled in during his absence and the team did much better and made the playoffs. Gerard turned down the coaching job.

=== Final standings ===
American Division
	GP	W	L	T	GF	GA	PTS
**Boston Bruins**	44	38	5	1	179	98	**77**
**Chicago Black Hawks**	44	21	18	5	117	111	**47**
**New York Rangers**	44	17	17	10	136	143	**44**
Detroit Cougars	44	14	24	6	117	133	**34**
Pittsburgh Pirates	44	5	36	3	102	185	**13**

Canadian Division
	GP	W	L	T	GF	GA	PTS
**Montreal Maroons**	44	23	16	5	141	114	**51**
**Montreal Canadiens**	44	21	14	9	142	114	**51**
**Ottawa Senators**	44	21	15	8	138	118	**50**
Toronto Maple Leafs	44	17	21	6	116	124	**40**
New York Americans	44	14	25	5	113	161	**33**

GP = Games Played, W = Wins, L = Losses, T = Ties, Pts = Points, GF = Goals For, GA = Goals Against
Teams that qualified for the playoffs are highlighted in bold.

== Playoffs ==
=== Playoff bracket ===
The top three teams in each division qualified for the playoffs. The two division winners met in a best-of-five Stanley Cup semifinal series. The divisional second-place teams and third-place teams played off in a two-game total-goals series to determine the participants for the other best-of-three semifinal series. The semifinal winners then played in a best-of-three Stanley Cup Finals.

First round
C2	Mtl Canadiens	3G
A2	Chicago	2G
C3	Ottawa	3G
A3	NY Rangers	6G

Semifinals
C1	Mtl Maroons	1
A1	Boston	3
C2	Mtl Canadiens	2
A3	NY Rangers	0

Final
C2	Mtl Canadiens	2
A1	Boston	0

=== Quarterfinals ===
==== (A2) Chicago Black Hawks vs. (C2) Montreal Canadiens ====
March 23	Montreal Canadiens	1–0	Chicago Black Hawks	Chicago Stadium	Recap
No scoring		First period	No scoring
No scoring		Second period	No scoring
Wildor Larochelle (1) – 07:40		Third period	No scoring
George Hainsworth		Goalie stats	Charlie Gardiner

March 26	Chicago Black Hawks	2–2	3OT	Montreal Canadiens	Montreal Forum	Recap
Ty Arbour (1) – 01:38		First period		No scoring
Earl Miller (1) – 12:49		Second period		09:20 – Howie Morenz (1)
No scoring		Third period		No scoring
No scoring		Third overtime period		11:53 – Howie Morenz (2)
Charlie Gardiner		Goalie stats		George Hainsworth

Montreal won series on total goals 3–2

==== (C3) Ottawa Senators vs. (A3) New York Rangers ====
March 20	New York Rangers	1–1	Ottawa Senators	Ottawa Auditorium	Recap
Leo Bourgeault (1) – 09:45		First period	No scoring
No scoring		Second period	No scoring
No scoring		Third period	06:45 – Art Gagne (1)
John Ross Roach		Goalie stats	Alex Connell

March 23	Ottawa Senators	2–5	New York Rangers	Madison Square Garden III	Recap
Bill Touhey (1) – 08:00		First period	No scoring
No scoring		Second period	09:02 – Bun Cook (1); 18:02 – Frank Boucher (1)
Harold Starr (1) – 13:26		Third period	04:16 – Murray Murdoch (1); 05:25 – Murray Murdoch (2); 06:46 – Bun Cook (2)
Alex Connell		Goalie stats	John Ross Roach

New York won series on total goals 6–3

=== Semifinals ===
==== (A1) Boston Bruins vs. (C1) Montreal Maroons ====
March 20	Boston Bruins	2–1	3OT	Montreal Maroons	Montreal Forum	Recap
No scoring		First period		No scoring
Cooney Weiland (1) – 12:34		Second period		09:41 – Dunc Munro (1)
No scoring		Third period		No scoring
Harry Oliver (1) – 05:35		Third overtime period		No scoring
Tiny Thompson		Goalie stats		Flat Walsh

March 22	Boston Bruins	4–2	Montreal Maroons	Montreal Forum	Recap
No scoring		First period	No scoring
Marty Barry (1) – 04:00; Harry Oliver (2) – 05:35; Dit Clapper (1) – 07:30		Second period	No scoring
Dit Clapper (2) – 19:24		Third period	10:07 – Hooley Smith (1); 13:22 – Nels Stewart (1)
Tiny Thompson		Goalie stats	Flat Walsh

March 25	Montreal Maroons	1–0	2OT	Boston Bruins	Boston Madison Square Garden	Recap
No scoring		First period		No scoring
No scoring		Second period		No scoring
No scoring		Third period		No scoring
Archie Wilcox (1) – 06:26		Second overtime period		No scoring
Flat Walsh		Goalie stats		Tiny Thompson

March 27	Montreal Maroons	1–5	Boston Bruins	Boston Madison Square Garden	Recap
No scoring		First period	15:26 – Marty Barry (2)
No scoring		Second period	08:11 – Lionel Hitchman (1)
Dunc Munro (2) – 19:08		Third period	06:51 – Bill Carson (1); 11:30 – Marty Barry (3); 17:39 – Dit Clapper (4)
Flat Walsh		Goalie stats	Tiny Thompson

Boston won series 3–1

==== (C2) Montreal Canadiens vs. (A3) New York Rangers ====
March 28	New York Rangers	1–2	4OT	Montreal Canadiens	Montreal Forum	Recap
Murray Murdoch (3) – 15:34		First period		No scoring
No scoring		Second period		16:44 – Armand Mondou (1)
No scoring		Third period		No scoring
No scoring		Fourth overtime period		08:52 – Gus Rivers (1)
John Ross Roach		Goalie stats		George Hainsworth

March 30	Montreal Canadiens	2–0	New York Rangers	Madison Square Garden III	Recap
Nick Wasnie (1) – 14:56; Pit Lepine (1) – 15:56		First period	No scoring
No scoring		Second period	No scoring
No scoring		Third period	No scoring
George Hainsworth		Goalie stats	John Ross Roach

Montreal won series 2–0

=== Stanley Cup Finals ===
After defeating the Montreal Maroons and after having not lost consecutive games all season, the Boston Bruins were swept by the Montreal Canadiens two games to none in a best-of-three series. The first game saw Boston play way below its usual form. The Canadiens then won the Stanley Cup with a 4–3 victory in game two. The Canadiens went 5–0–1 in the playoffs, making them one of the few Stanley Cup-winning teams in history to not lose a game in the playoffs.

April 1	Montreal Canadiens	3–0	Boston Bruins	Boston Madison Square Garden	Recap
No scoring		First period	No scoring
Albert Leduc (1) – 08:43; Sylvio Mantha (1) – 13:17		Second period	No scoring
Pit Lepine (2) – 06:27		Third period	No scoring
George Hainsworth		Goalie stats	Tiny Thompson

April 3	Boston Bruins	3–4	Montreal Canadiens	Montreal Forum	Recap
No scoring		First period	09:10 – Bert McCaffrey (1); 17:36 – Nick Wasnie (2)
Eddie Shore (1) – 10:42		Second period	01:33 – Sylvio Mantha (2); 15:43 – Howie Morenz (3)
Percy Galbraith (1) – 08:47; Dit Clapper (4) – 10:59		Third period	No scoring
Tiny Thompson		Goalie stats	George Hainsworth

Montreal won series 2–0

== Awards ==
Nels Stewart won the Hart Trophy for the second time. Frank Boucher won the Lady Byng for the third consecutive year. Tiny Thompson won the Vezina for the first time. Thompson would go on to win the trophy four times.

1929–30 NHL awards
O'Brien Cup: (Canadian Division champion)	Montreal Maroons
Prince of Wales Trophy: (American Division champion)	Boston Bruins
Hart Trophy: (Most valuable player)	Nels Stewart, Montreal Maroons
Lady Byng Trophy: (Excellence and sportsmanship)	Frank Boucher, New York Rangers
Vezina Trophy: (Fewest goals allowed)	Tiny Thompson, Boston Bruins

== Player statistics ==
=== Scoring leaders ===
Note: GP = Games played, G = Goals, A = Assists, PTS = Points, PIM = Penalties in minutes

PLAYER	TEAM	GP	G	A	PTS	PIM
Cooney Weiland	Boston Bruins	44	43	30	73	27
Frank Boucher	New York Rangers	42	26	36	62	16
Dit Clapper	Boston Bruins	44	41	20	61	48
Bill Cook	New York Rangers	44	29	30	59	56
Hec Kilrea	Ottawa Senators	44	36	22	58	70
Nels Stewart	Montreal Maroons	44	39	16	55	81
Howie Morenz	Montreal Canadiens	44	40	10	50	72
Norman Himes	New York Americans	44	28	22	50	15
Joe Lamb	Ottawa Senators	44	29	20	49	119
Dutch Gainor	Boston Bruins	42	18	31	49	39

Source: NHL.

=== Leading goaltenders ===
Note: GP = Games played; Mins = Minutes played; GA = Goals against; SO = Shutouts; GAA = Goals against average

Player	Team	GP	W	L	T	Mins	GA	SO	GAA
Tiny Thompson	Boston Bruins	44	38	5	1	2680	98	3	2.19
Flat Walsh	Montreal Maroons	30	16	10	4	1897	74	2	2.34
George Hainsworth	Montreal Canadiens	42	20	13	9	2680	108	4	2.42
Charlie Gardiner	Chicago Black Hawks	44	21	16	9	2750	111	3	2.42
Alex Connell	Ottawa Senators	44	21	15	8	2780	118	3	2.55

Source: NHL.

== Coaches ==
=== American Division ===
- Boston Bruins: Art Ross
- Chicago Black Hawks: Tom Shaughnessy and Bill Tobin
- Detroit Cougars: Jack Adams
- New York Rangers: Lester Patrick
- Pittsburgh Pirates:Frank Frederickson

=== Canadian Division ===
- Montreal Canadiens: Cecil Hart
- Montreal Maroons: Dunc Munro
- New York Americans: Lionel Conacher
- Ottawa Senators: Newsy Lalonde
- Toronto Maple Leafs: Conn Smythe

== Debuts ==
The following is a list of players of note who played their first NHL game in 1929–30 (listed with their first team, asterisk(*) marks debut in playoffs):

- Tom Cook, Chicago Black Hawks
- Ebbie Goodfellow, Detroit Cougars
- Syd Howe, Ottawa Senators
- Busher Jackson, Toronto Maple Leafs
- Charlie Conacher, Toronto Maple Leafs

== Last games ==
The following is a list of players of note that played their last game in the NHL in 1929–30 (listed with their last team):

- Mickey MacKay, Boston Bruins
- Jimmy Herbert, Detroit Cougars
- Clint Benedict, Montreal Maroons
- Frank Nighbor, Toronto Maple Leafs

== See also ==
- 1929–30 NHL transactions
- List of Stanley Cup champions
- 1929 in sports
- 1930 in sports

== Sources ==
- Diamond, Dan, ed. (2000). Total Hockey. Total Sports. ISBN 1-892129-85-X.
- Dinger, Ralph, ed. (2011). The National Hockey League Official Guide & Record Book 2012. Dan Diamond & Associates. ISBN 978-1-894801-22-5.
- Duplacey, James (1996). Diamond, Dan (ed.). The annotated rules of hockey. Lyons & Burford. ISBN 1-55821-466-6.
- Dryden, Steve, ed. (2000). Century of hockey. Toronto, ON: McClelland & Stewart Ltd. ISBN 0-7710-4179-9.
- Fischler, Stan; Fischler, Shirley; Hughes, Morgan; Romain, Joseph; Duplacey, James (2003). The Hockey Chronicle: Year-by-Year History of the National Hockey League. Publications International Inc. ISBN 0-7853-9624-1.
- McFarlane, Brian (1973). The Story of the National Hockey League. New York: Pagurian Press. ISBN 0-684-13424-1.
- Ross, J. Andrew (2015). Joining the Clubs: The Business of the National Hockey League to 1945. Syracuse University Press. ISBN 9780815633839.
