= Conacher =

Conacher is a surname of Scottish origin.

Bearers of the name include several members of a Canadian sporting family:

- Lionel Conacher (1900–1954), multi-sport athlete and politician, after whom the Lionel Conacher Award and Conacher Cup are named
  - Brian Conacher (born 1941), ice hockey player, Lionel's son
  - Lionel Conacher Jr. (born 1936), football player, Lionel's son
- Charlie Conacher (1909–1967), ice hockey player, Lionel's brother, after whom the Charlie Conacher Humanitarian Award is named
  - Pete Conacher (1932–2024), ice hockey player, Charlie's son
- Roy Conacher (1916–1984), ice hockey player, brother of Lionel and Charlie

Other people with this surname include:

- Cory Conacher (born 1989), Canadian ice hockey player
- Desmond Conacher (1918–2000), Canadian classical scholar
- Jim Conacher (1921–2020), Scottish-born Canadian ice hockey player
- Marion Conacher (1933–2021), Scottish missionary nurse
- Pat Conacher (born 1959), Canadian ice hockey player

== See also ==
- Conacher and Co., British organ builders based in Huddersfield, West Yorkshire
