= List of NHL players (C) =

This is a list of National Hockey League (NHL) players who have played at least one game in the NHL from 1917 to present and have a last name that starts with "C".

List updated as of the 2023–24 NHL season.

== Ca ==
- Nicholas Caamano
- Jack Caffery
- Terry Caffery
- Drake Caggiula
- Larry Cahan
- Charles Cahill
- Herbert Cain
- Jim "Dutch" Cain
- Don Cairns
- Eric Cairns
- Petr Cajanek
- Eric Calder
- Kyle Calder
- Ryan Caldwell
- Don Caley
- Norm Calladine
- Ryan Callahan
- Drew Callander
- Jock Callander
- Brett Callighen
- Frank "Patsy" Callighen
- Jan Caloun
- Matt Calvert
- Jim Camazzola
- Tony Camazzola
- Al Cameron
- Angus "Scotty" Cameron
- Billy Cameron
- Craig Cameron
- Dave Cameron
- Harry Cameron
- Mike Cammalleri
- Matt Campanale
- Andrew Campbell
- Brian Campbell
- Bryan Campbell
- Colin Campbell
- Darcy Campbell
- Dave Campbell
- Don Campbell
- Earl "Spiff" Campbell
- Gregory Campbell
- Jack Campbell
- Jim Campbell
- Scott Campbell
- Wade Campbell
- Tod Campeau
- Dominic Campedelli
- Carter Camper
- Chris Campoli
- Patrick Cannone
- Kyle Capobianco
- Frank Caprice
- Dave Capuano
- Jack Capuano
- Luca Caputi
- Leo Carbol
- Guy Carbonneau
- Daniel Carcillo
- Michael Carcone
- Mike Card
- Claude Cardin
- Steve Cardwell
- George Carey
- Jim Carey
- Matt Carey
- Paul Carey
- Matt Carkner
- Terry Carkner
- Mathieu Carle
- Matt Carle
- Wayne Carleton
- Brian Carlin
- Declan Carlile
- Brandon Carlo
- Jack Carlson
- John Carlson
- Kent Carlson
- Steve Carlson
- Anders Carlsson
- Gabriel Carlsson
- Leo Carlsson
- Lucas Carlsson
- Randy Carlyle
- Patrik Carnback
- Keith Carney
- Alain Caron
- Jacques Caron
- Jordan Caron
- Sebastien Caron
- Bobby Carpenter
- Eddie Carpenter
- Ryan Carpenter
- Al Carr
- Daniel Carr
- Gene Carr
- Lorne Carr
- Connor Carrick
- Sam Carrick
- Trevor Carrick
- Alexandre Carrier
- William Carrier
- Larry Carriere
- Gene Carrigan
- Billy Carroll
- George Carroll
- Greg Carroll
- Dwight Carruthers
- Bill Carse
- Bob Carse
- Bill Carson
- Brett Carson
- Frank Carson
- Gerald Carson
- Jimmy Carson
- Lindsay Carson
- Anson Carter
- Billy Carter
- Jeff Carter
- John Carter
- Lyle Carter
- Ron Carter
- Ryan Carter
- Michael Caruso
- Joe Carveth
- Jon Casey
- Wayne Cashman
- Mike Casselman
- Andrew Cassels
- Bruce Cassidy
- Tom Cassidy
- Frederic Cassivi
- Tony Cassolato
- Daniel Catenacci
- Jackson Cates
- Noah Cates
- Cole Caufield
- Jay Caufield
- Gino Cavallini
- Paul Cavallini
- Tom Cavanagh
- Colby Cave

== Ce–Ch ==
- Cody Ceci
- Roman Cechmanek
- Peter Cehlarik
- Sebastien Centomo
- Ray Ceresino
- Erik Černák
- Frantisek Cernik
- Roman Cervenka
- Frederic Chabot
- John Chabot
- Lorne Chabot
- Thomas Chabot
- John Chad
- Ed Chadwick
- Mitchell Chaffee
- William "Chick" Chalmers
- Milan Chalupa
- Erwin Chamberlain
- Shawn Chambers
- Andre Champagne
- Bob Champoux
- Rene Chapdelaine
- Art Chapman
- Blair Chapman
- Brian Chapman
- Michael Chaput
- Zdeno Chara
- Jose Charbonneau
- Stephane Charbonneau
- Bob Charlebois
- Todd Charlesworth
- Sebastien Charpentier
- Eric Charron
- Guy Charron
- Dave Chartier
- Rourke Chartier
- Brad Chartrand
- Rick Chartraw
- Kelly Chase
- Denis Chasse
- Jalen Chatfield
- Vladimir Chebaturkin
- Lude Check
- Jonathan Cheechoo
- Gerry Cheevers
- Ivan Chekhovich
- Chris Chelios
- Jake Chelios
- Mike Chernoff
- Rich Chernomaz
- Dick Cherry
- Don Cherry
- Denis Chervyakov
- Tim Cheveldae
- Real Chevrefils
- Alain Chevrier
- Ben Chiarot
- Alex Chiasson
- Steve Chiasson
- Igor Chibirev
- Andrei Chibisov
- Nikita Chibrikov
- Dan Chicoine
- Jason Chimera
- Egor Chinakhov
- Rick Chinnick
- Kyle Chipchura
- Ron Chipperfield
- Art Chisholm
- Colin Chisholm
- Declan Chisholm
- Lex Chisholm
- Stanislav Chistov
- Filip Chlapik
- Sasha Chmelevski
- Dennis Cholowski
- Marc Chorney
- Taylor Chorney
- Tom Chorske
- Eric Chouinard
- Guy Chouinard
- Jean Chouinard
- Marc Chouinard
- Erik Christensen
- Dave Christian
- Jeff Christian
- Mike Christie
- Ryan Christie
- Steve Christoff
- Magnus Chrona
- Bob Chrystal
- Artem Chubarov
- Kris Chucko
- Brad Church
- Jack Church
- Shane Churla
- Jakob Chychrun
- Jeff Chychrun
- Dean Chynoweth
- Filip Chytil
- Dave Chyzowski

== Ci–Cl ==
- Peter Ciavaglia
- Martin Cibak
- Dino Ciccarelli
- Enrico Ciccone
- Nick Cicek
- Chris Cichocki
- Ivan Ciernik
- Jozef Cierny
- Hank Ciesla
- Zdeno Ciger
- Tony Cimellaro
- Robert Cimetta
- Joe Cirella
- Anthony Cirelli
- Jason Cirone
- Marian Cisar
- Casey Cizikas
- Kim Clackson
- Fredrik Claesson
- Kale Clague
- Francis "King" Clancy
- Terry Clancy
- Aubrey "Dit" Clapper
- Brett Clark
- Chris Clark
- Dan Clark
- Dean Clark
- Gordie Clark
- Mat Clark
- Wendel Clark
- Bobby Clarke
- Brandt Clarke
- Dale Clarke
- Graeme Clarke
- David Clarkson
- Greg Classen
- Daniel Cleary
- Odie Cleghorn
- Sprague Cleghorn
- Bill Clement
- Scott Clemmensen
- Adam Clendening
- Marc-Andre Cliche
- Chris Clifford
- Kyle Clifford
- Connor Clifton
- Matt Climie
- Bruce Cline
- Steve Clippingdale
- Grant Clitsome
- Dan Cloutier
- Jacques Cloutier
- Real Cloutier
- Rejean Cloutier
- Roland Cloutier
- Sylvain Cloutier
- Ryane Clowe
- Rich Clune
- Wally Clune
- Nathan Clurman
- Cal Clutterbuck
- Ben Clymer

== Co ==
- Gary Coalter
- Steve Coates
- Braydon Coburn
- Glen Cochrane
- Paul Coffey
- Hugh Coflin
- Dylan Coghlan
- Andrew Cogliano
- Colby Cohen
- Carlo Colaiacovo
- Sam Colangelo
- Joe Colborne
- Danton Cole
- Erik Cole
- Ian Cole
- Blake Coleman
- Gerald Coleman
- Kevin Colley
- Tom Colley
- Norman "Dodger" Collings
- Bill Collins
- Gary Collins
- Rob Collins
- Sean Collins
- Jeremy Colliton
- Bob Collyard
- Mike Colman
- Ross Colton
- Mac Colville
- Neil Colville
- Les Colvin
- Les Colwill
- Blake Comeau
- Rey Comeau
- Mike Commodore
- J. T. Compher
- Eric Comrie
- Mike Comrie
- Paul Comrie
- Max Comtois
- Brian Conacher
- Charlie Conacher
- Cory Conacher
- Jim Conacher
- Lionel Conacher
- Pat Conacher
- Pete Conacher
- Roy Conacher
- Tim Conboy
- Mike Condon
- Lucas Condotta
- Erik Condra
- Ty Conklin
- Maitland "Red" Conn
- Rob Conn
- Kevin Connauton
- Alex Connell
- Bert Connelly
- Wayne Connelly
- Chris Conner
- Brett Connolly
- Mike Connolly
- Tim Connolly
- Cam Connor
- Harry Connor
- Kyle Connor
- Bobby Connors
- Al Conroy
- Craig Conroy
- Joe Contini
- Brandon Convery
- Eddie Convey
- Alex "Bud" Cook
- Bill Cook
- Bob Cook
- Frederick "Bun" Cook
- Lloyd Cook
- Tom Cook
- Matt Cooke
- Devin Cooley
- Logan Cooley
- Carson Cooper
- David Cooper
- Ed Cooper
- Hal Cooper
- Joe Cooper
- Pheonix Copley
- Andrew Copp
- Bob Copp
- Bert Corbeau
- Rene Corbet
- Mike Corbett
- Norm Corcoran
- Jared Coreau
- Bob Corkum
- Lukas Cormier
- Patrice Cormier
- Roger Cormier
- Philippe Cornet
- Mark Cornforth
- Matthew Coronato
- Frank Corrado
- Matthew Corrente
- Charles Corrigan
- Mike Corrigan
- Chris Corrinet
- Andre Corriveau
- Yvon Corriveau
- Jim Corsi
- Daniel Corso
- Shayne Corson
- Joe Corvo
- Ross Cory
- Jacques Cossette
- Les Costello
- Murray Costello
- Rich Costello
- Charlie Cotch
- Alain Cote (born 1957)
- Alain Cote (born 1967)
- Jean-Philippe Cote
- Patrick Cote
- Ray Cote
- Riley Cote
- Sylvain Cote
- Paul Cotter
- Harold "Baldy" Cotton
- John Coughlin
- Tim Coulis
- Patrick Coulombe
- D'Arcy Coulson
- Arthur Coulter
- Neal Coulter
- Thomas Coulter
- Yvan Cournoyer
- Maurice Courteau
- Yves Courteau
- Ed Courtenay
- Geoff Courtnall
- Russ Courtnall
- Larry Courville
- Marcel Cousineau
- Nick Cousins
- Billy Coutu
- Gerry Couture
- Logan Couture
- Rosario Couture
- Sean Couturier
- Sylvain Couturier
- Jeff Cowan
- Jared Cowen
- Bruce Cowick
- Rob Cowie
- Bill Cowley
- Wayne Cowley
- Abbie Cox
- Danny Cox
- Craig Coxe
- Charlie Coyle
- Dylan Cozens

== Cr ==
- Joey Crabb
- Adam Cracknell
- Jim Craig
- Mike Craig
- Ryan Craig
- John Craighead
- Dale Craigwell
- Joseph Cramarossa
- Bart Crashley
- Murray Craven
- Bob Crawford
- Bobby Crawford
- Corey Crawford
- Jack Crawford
- Lou Crawford
- Marc Crawford
- Rusty Crawford
- Adam Creighton
- Dave Creighton
- Jimmy Creighton
- Dave Cressman
- Glen Cressman
- Andrew Crescenzi
- Louis Crevier
- Jiri Crha
- Kyle Criscuolo
- Terry Crisp
- Ed Cristofoli
- Maurice Croghan
- B. J. Crombeen
- Mike Crombeen
- Shawn Cronin
- Angus Crookshank
- Sidney Crosby
- Cory Cross
- Tommy Cross
- Stanley Crossett
- Doug Crossman
- Gary Croteau
- Cameron Crotty
- Lawson Crouse
- Bruce Crowder
- Keith Crowder
- Troy Crowder
- Phil Crowe
- Mike Crowley
- Ted Crowley
- Max Crozier
- Greg Crozier
- Joe Crozier
- Roger Crozier
- Nels Crutchfield

== Cu–Cz ==
- Wilf Cude
- Jim Culhane
- Barry Cullen
- Brian Cullen
- David Cullen
- John Cullen
- Mark Cullen
- Matt Cullen
- Ray Cullen
- Jassen Cullimore
- Tyler Cuma
- Barry Cummins
- Jim Cummins
- Kyle Cumiskey
- Mark Cundari
- Randy Cunneyworth
- Bob Cunningham
- Craig Cunningham
- Jim Cunningham
- Les Cunningham
- Bill Cupolo
- Brian Curran
- Dan Currie
- Glen Currie
- Hugh Currie
- Josh Currie
- Tony Currie
- Floyd Curry
- John Curry
- Tony Curtale
- Paul Curtis
- Ian Cushenan
- Jean Cusson
- Jakub Cutta
- Don Cutts
- Will Cuylle
- Claude Cyr
- Denis Cyr
- Paul Cyr
- Austin Czarnik
- Mariusz Czerkawski
- Kevin Czuczman

== See also ==
- hockeydb.com NHL Player List - C
