= Bill Mitchell (Canadian football) =

Canadian football player

Profile
- Positions: Center, Kicker

Personal information
- Born: August 2, 1935 (age 91); London, England
- Listed height: 6 ft 1 in (1.85 m)
- Listed weight: 225 lb (102 kg)

Career information
- University: Western Ontario
- CFL draft: 1960: 1st round, 1st overall pick

Career history
- 1960–1962: Toronto Argonauts
- 1963–1965: Edmonton Eskimos
- 1966–1968: BC Lions

Awards and highlights
- 1960 - Gruen Trophy

Bill Mitchell (born August 2, 1935) is a former award winning professional Canadian football centre in the Canadian Football League. He also regularly played defensive line and was a kicker.

Born in England and coming to Canada at 11 years old, Mitchell graduated from the University of Western Ontario as the Mustangs most valuable player. The Toronto Argonauts stirred up considerable controversy when they selected him in the draft, as they passed over Lionel Conacher Jr., (the son of Canadian sports legend Lionel Conacher) who went to the Montreal Alouettes. However, the Boatmen were immediately rewarded, as Mitchell played both offensive and defensive line (and intercepted 2 passes) and won the Gruen Trophy as best rookie in the Eastern Conference. He also scored 60 points in 1962 as a backup kicker when Cookie Gilchrist was injured.

After three seasons in Toronto, he was traded to the Edmonton Eskimos in a blockbuster 6 player deal that saw the famed Jackie Parker head east. In three seasons in Edmonton, besides being a lineman, he scored 123 points with his boot, including a 58-yard field goal (versus the Calgary Stampeders on August 17, 1964) which was the longest in CFL history at the time.

Mitchell was traded to the British Columbia Lions in 1966 and scored his highest points in a season that year with 67. He retired three games into the 1968 season.

His brother Doug Mitchell also played in the CFL with the Hamilton Tiger-Cats and the Montreal Alouettes.
