= Murray Henderson (ice hockey) =

Canadian ice hockey player

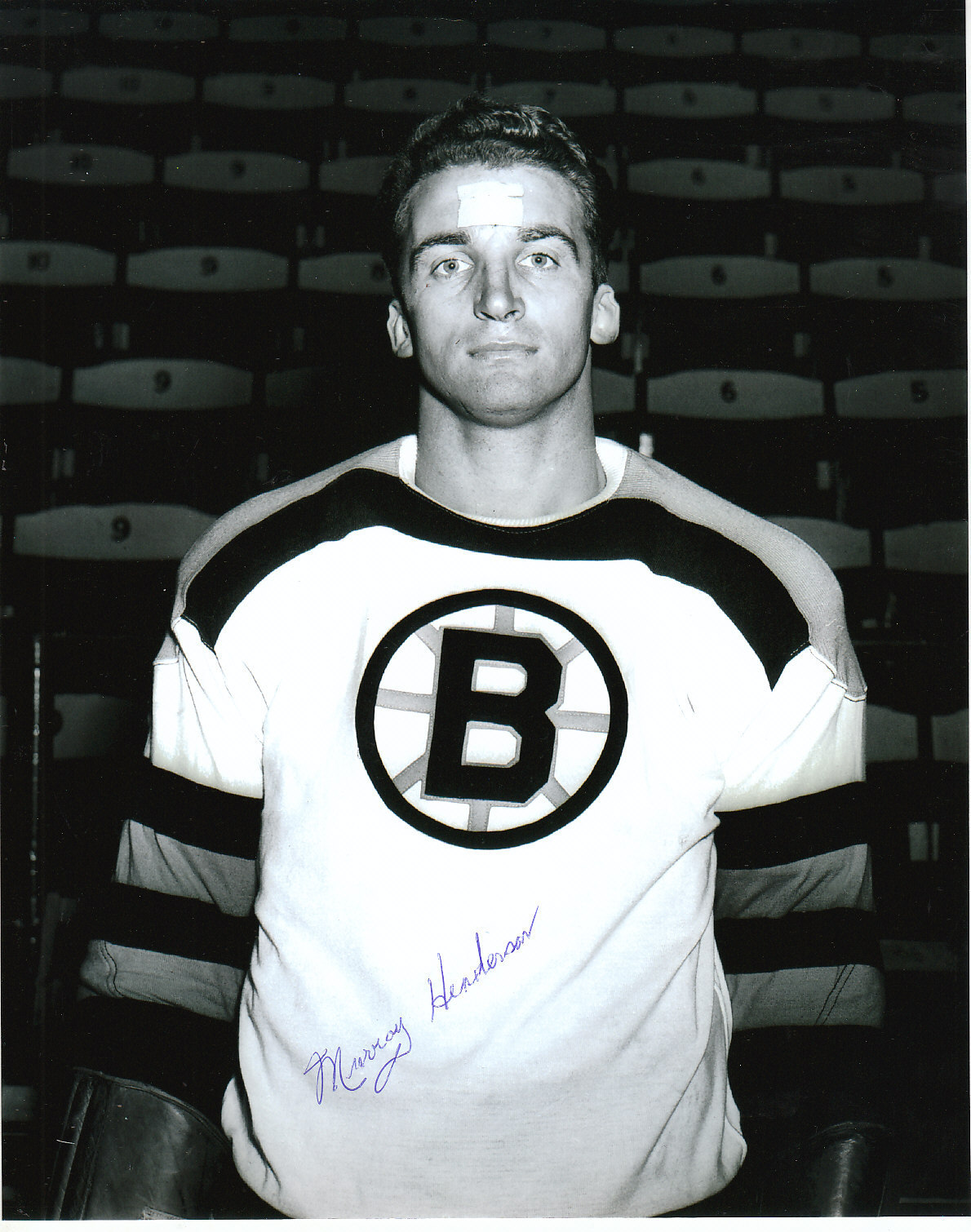
- Born: September 5, 1921 Toronto, Ontario, Canada
- Died: January 4, 2013 (aged 91) Toronto, Ontario, Canada
- Height: 6 ft 0 in (183 cm)
- Weight: 180 lb (82 kg; 12 st 12 lb)
- Position: Defence
- Shot: Left
- Played for: Boston Bruins
- Playing career: 1944–1956

John Murray "Moe" Henderson (September 5, 1921 — January 4, 2013) was a Canadian professional ice hockey defenceman who played 405 games in the National Hockey League with the Boston Bruins between 1945 and 1952.

== Biography ==
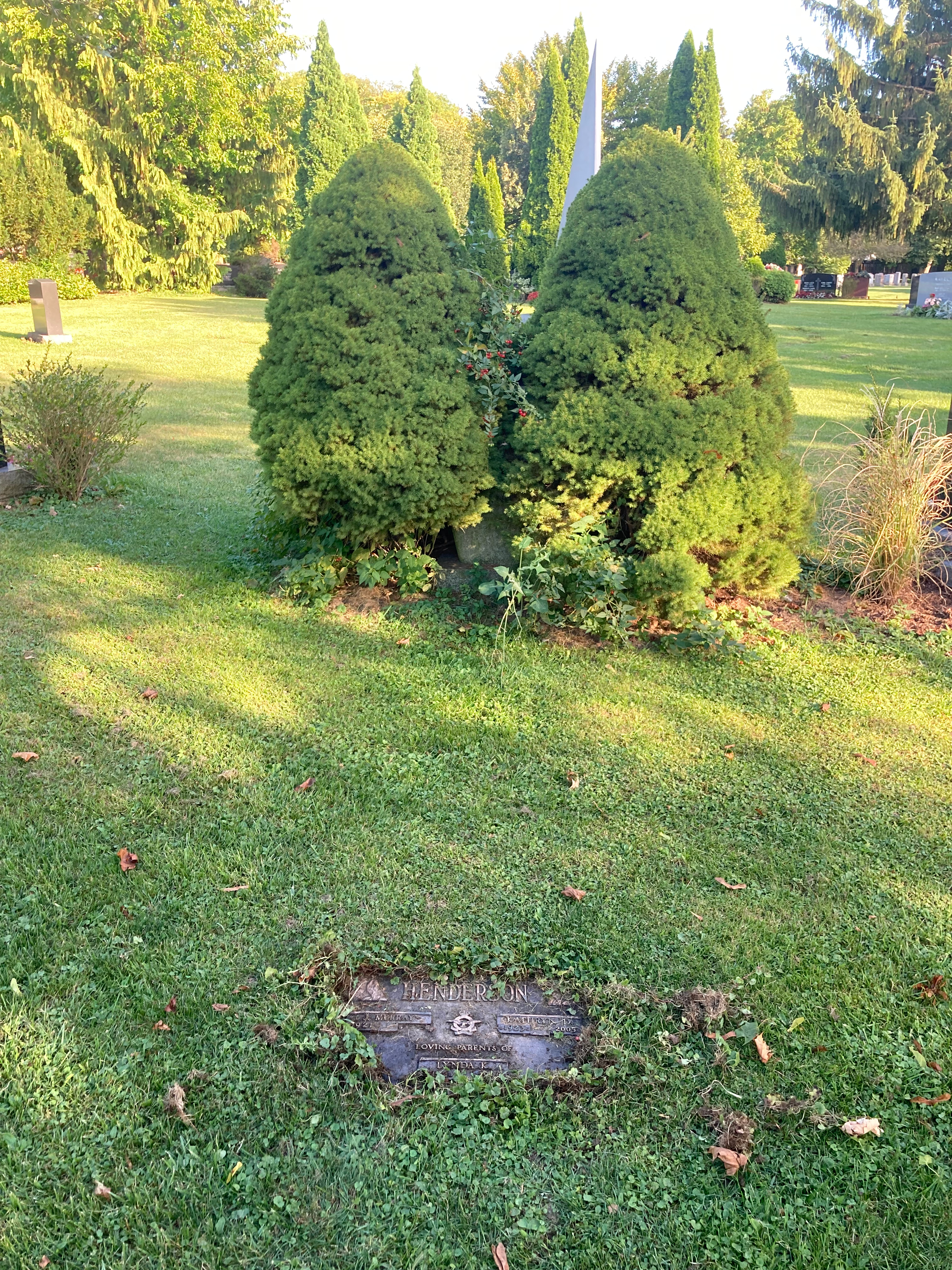
Henderson's grave at York Cemetery

Born in Toronto, Ontario in 1921, Henderson played junior hockey with the Toronto Young Rangers. In 1942 he joined the Royal Canadian Air Force and was stationed on the Pacific coast where he flew patrol missions. He was discharged two years later following the death of his father. Henderson played briefly for the Boston Olympics, a farm team of the Boston Bruins, before joining the big club for five games at the end of the 1944-1945 season. In total Henderson played eight seasons with the Bruins and registered 24 goals and 62 assists. Following his NHL career, he spent four seasons as the player-coach of the Hershey Bears.

Henderson was the nephew of the Conacher brothers Roy, Lionel and Charlie, who were all inducted into the Hockey Hall of Fame. He was also the cousin of Brian, Pete and Lionel Conacher, Jr.

He died on January 4, 2013, and was buried at York Cemetery, Toronto.

== Career statistics ==
=== Regular season and playoffs ===
			Regular season					Playoffs
Season	Team	League	GP	G	A	Pts	PIM	GP	G	A	Pts	PIM
1938–39	Toronto Young Rangers	OHA	9	0	0	0	0	1	0	0	0	2
1938–39	Upper Canada College	OHA-B	6	2	1	3	2	—	—	—	—	—
1939–40	Toronto Young Rangers	OHA	20	4	3	7	18	2	0	0	0	2
1940–41	Toronto Young Rangers	OHA	15	5	0	5	8	5	2	0	2	8
1941–42	Toronto Marlboros	OHA	28	2	4	6	10	6	2	1	3	8
1942–43	Toronto RCAF	OHA Sr	10	2	5	7	19	9	2	7	9	12
1942–43	Toronto RCAF	Al-Cup	—	—	—	—	—	4	0	2	2	4
1943–44	Toronto RCAF	OHA Sr	7	6	1	7	6	—	—	—	—	—
1944–45	Boston Bruins	NHL	5	0	1	1	4	7	0	1	1	2
1944–45	Boston Olympics	EAHL	3	1	2	3	4	3	2	2	4	2
1944–45	Toronto RCAF	TNDHL	2	2	1	3	0	—	—	—	—	—
1945–46	Boston Bruins	NHL	48	4	11	15	30	10	1	1	2	4
1946–47	Boston Bruins	NHL	57	5	12	17	63	4	0	0	0	4
1947–48	Boston Bruins	NHL	49	6	8	14	50	3	1	0	1	5
1948–49	Boston Bruins	NHL	60	2	9	11	28	5	0	1	1	2
1949–50	Boston Bruins	NHL	64	3	8	11	42	—	—	—	—	—
1950–51	Boston Bruins	NHL	66	4	7	11	37	5	0	0	0	2
1951–52	Boston Bruins	NHL	56	0	6	6	51	7	0	0	0	4
1952–53	Hershey Bears	AHL	61	4	19	23	49	3	0	0	0	0
1953–54	Hershey Bears	AHL	69	7	25	32	85	11	0	3	3	12
1954–55	Hershey Bears	AHL	59	4	14	18	61	—	—	—	—	—
1955–56	Hershey Bears	AHL	9	0	3	3	8	—	—	—	—	—
NHL totals			405	24	62	86	305	41	2	3	5	23
