= Peter Conacher =

Peter Conacher may refer to:

- Pete Conacher (1932–2024), Canadian ice hockey player
- Peter Conacher (1823–1894), British pipe-organ builder, see Conacher and Co
