= The Kid Line =

NHL line

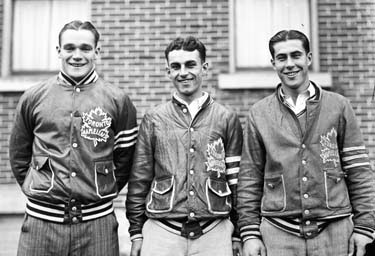
The Kid Line of Conacher, Primeau and Jackson

The Kid Line was an NHL line for the Toronto Maple Leafs in the 1930s. It included Charlie Conacher, Harvey "Busher" Jackson and Joe Primeau. When they first came together as a line in late 1929, Primeau was the oldest at 23 years old, while Jackson and Conacher were both 18. All three players are members of the Hockey Hall of Fame. All but Primeau was born in Toronto but they all grew up in the city.

Maple Leafs coach Conn Smythe, put the line together, and it helped the Maple Leafs win the 1932 Stanley Cup and lead the Leafs to four more Stanley Cup finals appearances over the next six years. This original line has been featured in a children's book called The Kid Line.

The title was later revived as a nostalgic reference to the dynamic line combinations of the Edmonton Oilers during the 1990s, specifically highlighting the gritty and effective trio of Adam Graves, Joe Murphy, and Martin Gelinas, who were known for their energy, tenacity, and contribution during a transitional period for the team. The moniker was again brought back in the 2007-08 NHL season to describe the youthful and promising forward line of Sam Gagner, Andrew Cogliano, and Robert Nilsson. This group, often referred to as a modern incarnation of the earlier line, symbolized the Oilers’ hope for a new generation of skilled, fast-paced players who could help restore the team to its former competitive glory. Both versions of the line, separated by more than a decade, served as fan favorites and carried with them the legacy of hardworking, high-potential forward groups within the Oilers franchise.

More recently, the title has been used as a reference to other lines, like the Edmonton Oilers - Taylor Hall, Ryan Nugent-Hopkins and Jordan Eberle, starting in 2011-12, the Montreal Canadiens - Alex Galchenyuk, Lars Eller and Brendan Gallagher starting in 2013-14, the New York Islanders - Brock Nelson, Ryan Strome and Anders Lee, and the New York Rangers - Alexis Lafrenière, Kaapo Kakko and Filip Chytil in 2021-2022.

== See also ==
- List of ice hockey line nicknames
