= Joe Primeau =

Canadian ice hockey player (1906–1989)

- Hockey Hall of Fame, 1963
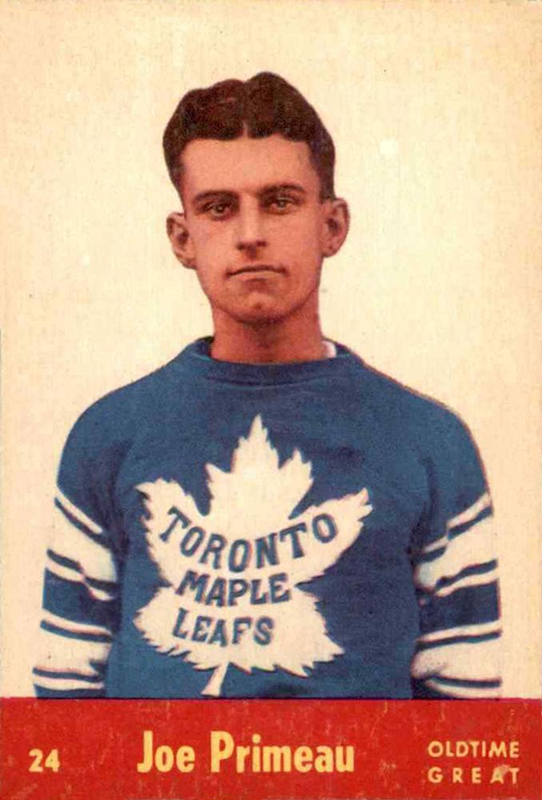
- 1955 card of Primeau
- Born: January 29, 1906 Lindsay, Ontario, Canada
- Died: May 14, 1989 (aged 83) Toronto, Ontario, Canada
- Height: 5 ft 9 in (175 cm)
- Weight: 160 lb (73 kg; 11 st 6 lb)
- Position: Centre
- Shot: Left
- Played for: Toronto Maple Leafs
- Playing career: 1927–1936

Alfred Joseph Francis "Gentleman Joe" Primeau (January 29, 1906 – May 14, 1989), was a Canadian professional ice hockey player for the Toronto Maple Leafs of the National Hockey League.

== Playing career ==
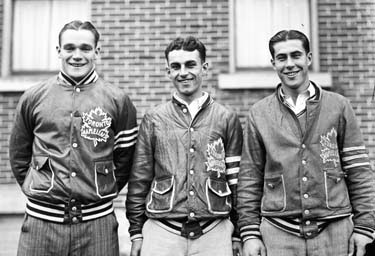
The Kid Line of Charlie Conacher, Primeau (center) and Busher Jackson in the 1930s; all three ended up inducted into the Hockey Hall of Fame.

Born in Lindsay, Ontario, and raised in Victoria, British Columbia, Primeau moved to Toronto at an early age and began his professional career in 1927 with the Toronto Ravinas, an affiliate of the Toronto Maple Leafs. While he played in a handful of games for the Maple Leafs in the previous two seasons, he became a full-time member of the Maple Leafs in the 1929–30 season, famously centering the Kid Line with Charlie Conacher and Busher Jackson. He tied for ninth in the league for assists that year with 21.

In 1930–31, with Conacher on his right wing blossoming into a great scoring star and recording the first of his five goal-scoring championships, Primeau finished sixth in league scoring with 41 points. After failing to make the playoffs in his rookie season, the Kid Line led Toronto to a second place position in the Canadian Division, but the Leafs fell in the opening round of the playoffs to Chicago. Primeau placed third in voting for the Lady Byng Memorial Trophy.

The 1931-32 season saw the inauguration of the new Maple Leaf Gardens, and it was Primeau's best season. Helping lead the Leafs to their only Stanley Cup championship of his career, he scored 50 points to finish second in league scoring (behind linemate Jackson), led the league in assists with 37, and was awarded the Lady Byng Memorial Trophy, breaking Frank Boucher's streak of four straight Byng Trophies.

1933–34 saw Primeau return to full form, finishing second (behind Conacher with 52) in league scoring with 46 and once again leading the league in assists. With Jackson finishing seventh with 38, the Kid Line led the league in forward line scoring by a wide margin. Conacher and Jackson both were named First Team All-Stars, while Primeau was named to the Second Team, as well as finishing runner-up in Byng voting once again to Boucher.

Primeau retired in 1936 at age 30. Over his NHL career, Primeau scored 66 goals and 177 assists in 310 games.

== Retirement and coaching career ==
Primeau operated a concrete business in the offseasons (which became Primeau-Argo Block), and running the business contributed to his early retirement. In his personal life, he was married to his wife Helen, and had five children, Joseph Jr, William, Robert, Anne-Marie and Richard, as well as numerous grandchildren.

Going into coaching in 1946 with his old Toronto St. Michaels team for three seasons, he coached the Majors to a Memorial Cup title in his first year, racking up a 33-3 regular season record. He moved on to coach the Toronto Marlboros senior team to the Allan Cup championship in 1950, and was hired thereafter to be the head coach for the Maple Leafs. Primeau won the Stanley Cup in his first year as head coach of the Maple Leafs in 1950–51. He remains the only coach to ever lead teams to the Memorial Cup, Allan Cup and Stanley Cup championships.

Primeau was inducted into the Hockey Hall of Fame in 1963.

He died in Toronto, Ontario at the age of 83, and was interred in the Assumption Catholic Cemetery, Mississauga.

In 1989, Primeau was ranked number 92 on The Hockey News' list of the 100 Greatest Hockey Players.

== Awards and achievements ==
=== Player ===
- 1931–32 – Stanley Cup Champion – Toronto Maple Leafs
- 1931–32 – Lady Byng Memorial Trophy
- 1933–34 – Second Team All-Star – Centre
- 1963 – Honoured member – Hockey Hall of Fame

=== Coach ===
- 1946–47 – Memorial Cup Champion – Toronto St. Michael's Majors
- 1949–50 – Allan Cup Champion – Toronto Marlboros
- 1950–51 – Stanley Cup Champion – Toronto Maple Leafs

== Career statistics ==
=== Regular season and playoffs ===
			Regular season					Playoffs
Season	Team	League	GP	G	A	Pts	PIM	GP	G	A	Pts	PIM
1923–24	Toronto St. Michael's Majors	OHA-Jr.	6	1	1	2	—	—	—	—	—
1924–25	Toronto St. Mary's	OHA-Jr.	8	7	3	10	—	—	—	—	—	—
1925–26	Toronto St. Mary's	OHA-Jr.	7	15	2	17	2	2	2	1	3	—
1926–27	Toronto Marlboros	OHA-Jr.	10	11	3	14	4	—	—	—	—	—
1927–28	Toronto Maple Leafs	NHL	2	0	0	0	0	—	—	—	—	—
1927–28	Toronto Ravinas	Can-Pro	41	26	13	39	36	2	1	0	1	0
1928–29	Toronto Maple Leafs	NHL	6	0	1	1	2	—	—	—	—	—
1928–29	London Panthers	Can-Pro	35	12	10	22	16	—	—	—	—	—
1929–30	Toronto Maple Leafs	NHL	43	5	21	26	22	—	—	—	—	—
1930–31	Toronto Maple Leafs	NHL	38	9	32	41	18	2	0	0	0	0
1931–32	Toronto Maple Leafs	NHL	45	13	37	50	25	7	0	6	6	2
1932–33	Toronto Maple Leafs	NHL	48	11	21	32	4	8	0	1	1	4
1933–34	Toronto Maple Leafs	NHL	45	14	32	46	8	5	2	4	6	6
1934–35	Toronto Maple Leafs	NHL	37	10	20	30	16	7	0	3	3	0
1935–36	Toronto Maple Leafs	NHL	45	4	13	17	10	9	3	4	7	0
NHL totals			310	66	177	243	105	38	5	18	23	12

== Coaching record ==
Team	Year	Regular season						Postseason			
Team	Year	G	W	L	T	Pts	Finish	W	L	Win%	Result
Toronto Maple Leafs	1950–51	70	41	16	13	95	2nd in NHL	8	2	.800	Won Stanley Cup
Toronto Maple Leafs	1951–52	70	29	25	16	74	3rd in NHL	0	4	.000	Lost in semifinals
Toronto Maple Leafs	1952–53	70	27	30	13	67	5th in NHL				Did not qualify
NHL Totals		210	97	71	42	236		8	6	.571	1 Stanley Cup title

Preceded by Frank Boucher	Winner of the Lady Byng Trophy; 1932	Succeeded by Frank Boucher
Preceded by Hap Day	Head coach of the Toronto Maple Leafs; 1950–53	Succeeded by King Clancy
