= Doug Mitchell (Canadian football) =

Former Canadian football player

Profile
- Position: Center

Personal information
- Born: June 14, 1942 (age 84); Harrow, United Kingdom
- Listed height: 6 ft 2 in (1.88 m)
- Listed weight: 240 lb (109 kg)

Career information
- College: University of Western Ontario

Career history

Playing
- 1967–1974: Hamilton Tiger-Cats
- 1974: Montreal Alouettes

Coaching
- 1978–1982: Mount Allison University
- 1983–1987: University of Toronto

Awards and highlights
- 3× Grey Cup (1967, 1972, 1974)

Doug Herbert Mitchell (born June 14, 1942) is a former offensive lineman who played eight seasons in the Canadian Football League (CFL), winning three Grey Cups.

A born in the United Kingdom, Mitchell took to Canadian football and starred with the Western Ontario Mustangs. He began his pro career with the Hamilton Tiger-Cats, playing 8 seasons, 98 games and 2 Grey Cup championships. He finished his final year with 8 games with the Montreal Alouettes, and won his final Grey Cup in 1974. After retiring, Mitchell was the head football coach at Mount Allison University and the University of Toronto.

His brother is CFL player Bill Mitchell.
