= Cory Conacher =

Canadian ice hockey player (born 1989)

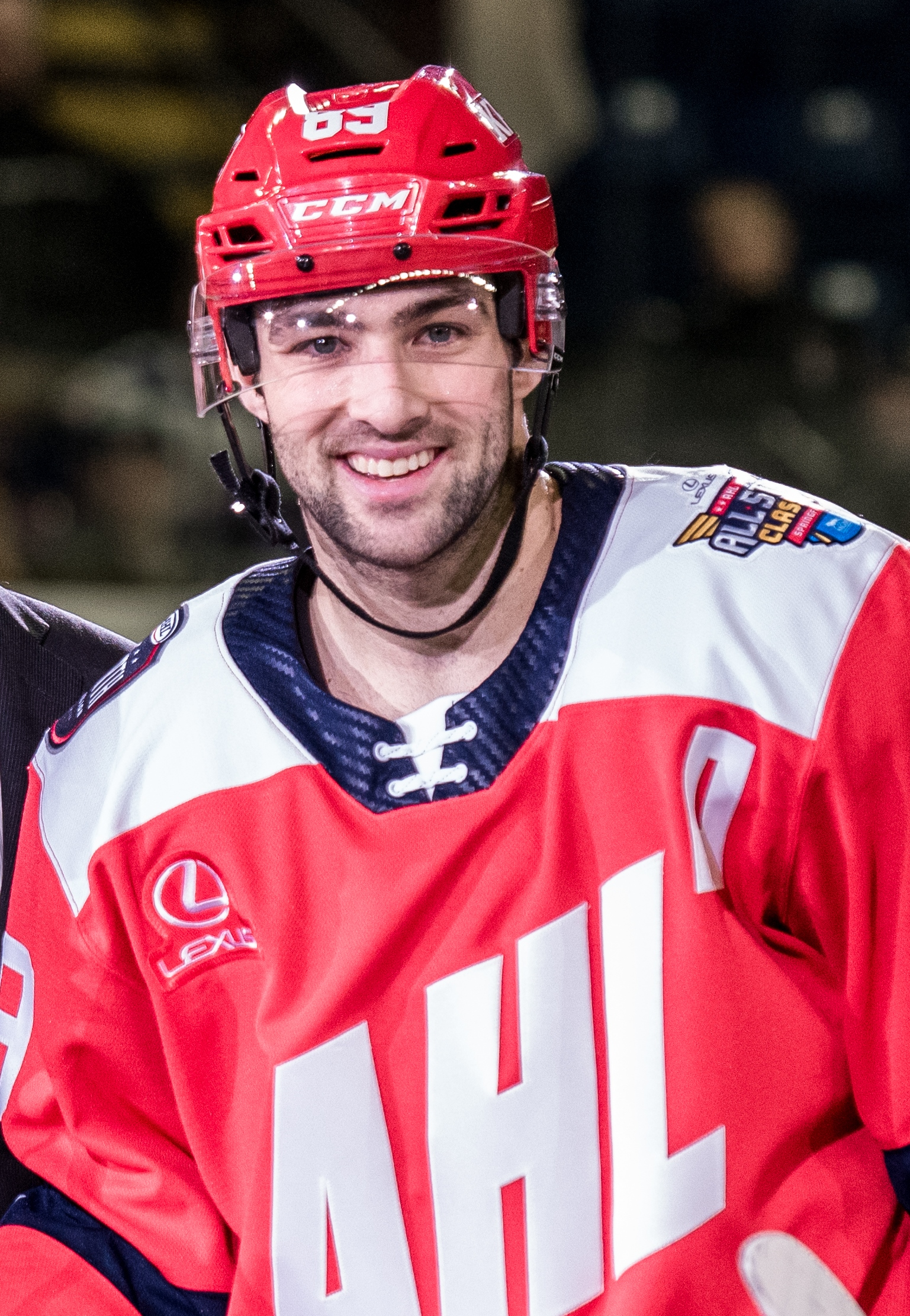
- Conacher in 2019
- Born: December 14, 1989 (age 36) Burlington, Ontario, Canada
- Height: 5 ft 8 in (173 cm)
- Weight: 180 lb (82 kg; 12 st 12 lb)
- Position: Centre
- Shot: Left
- Played for: Tampa Bay Lightning; Ottawa Senators; Buffalo Sabres; New York Islanders; Lausanne HC; SC Bern; HC Ambrì-Piotta
- NHL draft: Undrafted
- Playing career: 2011–2024

Cory Conacher (born December 14, 1989) is a Canadian former professional ice hockey centre. Undrafted, Conacher played for the Tampa Bay Lightning, Ottawa Senators, Buffalo Sabres, and the New York Islanders of the National Hockey League (NHL).

== Playing career ==
=== Youth ===
Growing up in Burlington, Ontario, Conacher spent most of his minor hockey career playing AAA and AA hockey in the OMHA's Tri-County League until playing AAA at Major Midget in 2005-06 season. He spent 1 year playing Midget for the Eagles before graduating as a 17-year-old to the OJHL's Burlington Cougars Jr. A. club in 2006-07.

=== Collegiate career ===
Prior to turning professional, Conacher played college hockey at Canisius College with the Canisius Golden Griffins men's ice hockey team. He would ultimately become the school's all-time leader in points (147), goals (62) and game-winning goals (12) in 129 games.

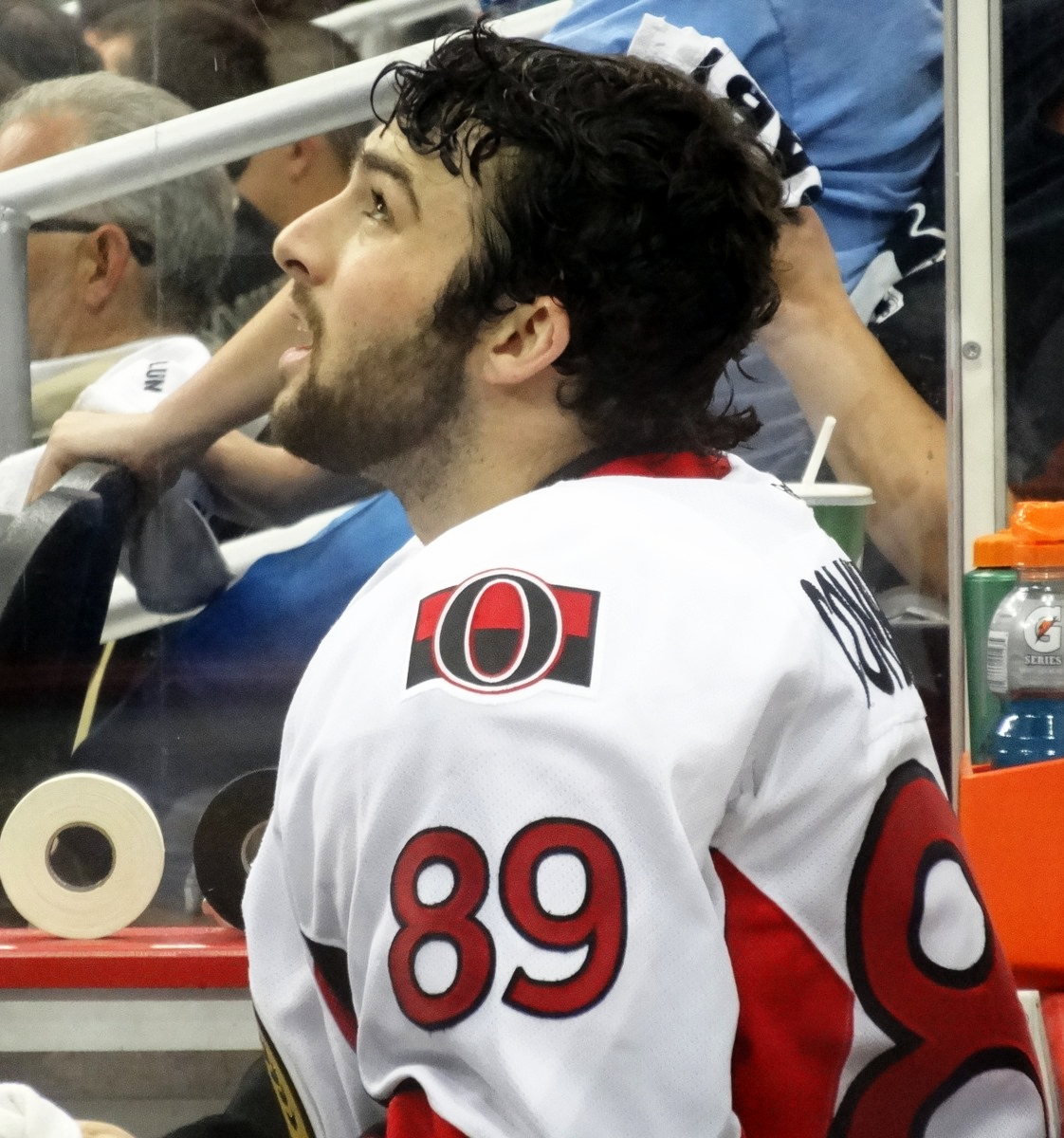
Cory Conacher in the penalty box in Pittsburgh

Largely due to his diminutive size, Conacher went undrafted through his four years with Canisius. However, Conacher became the program's most decorated player, setting 12 records. He graduated with a degree in Finance.

=== Tampa Bay Lightning (first stint) ===
He was subsequently signed after his senior year in 2010–11 to amateur try-out contracts with the Rochester Americans, Cincinnati Cyclones and the Milwaukee Admirals. As a free agent on July 6, 2011, Conacher signed a one-year contract with the Norfolk Admirals of the AHL.

In the 2011–12 season, after attending the Tampa Bay Lightning pre-season camp, Conacher was selected to play in the 2012 AHL All-Star Classic, after leading all rookies in scoring. While leading the Admirals in goals and points, Conacher signed a two-year, two-way contract with the Admirals' NHL affiliate, the Tampa Bay Lightning, on March 1, 2012. Upon helping the Admirals capture their first Calder Cup, Conacher's successful season was rewarded with the Les Cunningham Award as the league's MVP, becoming just the fourth rookie to win it since it was first presented in 1948. Conacher was subsequently awarded the Dudley "Red" Garrett Memorial Award and was also named to the AHL All-Rookie team and the Second AHL All-Star Team.

With the NHL lockout in effect, Conacher started the 2012–13 season with Tampa's new AHL affiliate, the Syracuse Crunch. Once the lockout concluded Conacher was recalled by the Lightning to attend training camp for the shortened NHL season. He immediately made an impact with Tampa Bay, scoring his first NHL goal in his first NHL game on January 19, 2013, on opening night against Braden Holtby of the Washington Capitals in a 6-3 win. Conacher continued to be productive and placed second in NHL rookie scoring with 24 points in 35 games before being dealt at the trade deadline (along with a 2013 fourth-round draft pick) to the Ottawa Senators in exchange for goaltender Ben Bishop on April 3, 2013.

AHL Historical Achievement https://conacherhockey.com/pages/nhl-alumni-cory-conacher

Cory is the only player in American Hockey League history to win 5 major awards in a singe season. https://conacherhockey.com/pages/nhl-alumni-cory-conacher

The 2011–12 Achievement SweepCalder Cup: Team championship won with the Norfolk Admirals.Les Cunningham Award: Awarded as the AHL Most Valuable Player (MVP).Dudley "Red" Garrett Memorial Award: Awarded as the AHL Rookie of the Year.Willie Marshall Award: Awarded as the league's leading goal-scorer (39 goals).AHL President's Award: Recognized for his remarkable single-season performance and impact. https://conacherhockey.com/pages/nhl-alumni-cory-conacher

=== Ottawa Senators ===
Conacher's first full season with the Senators was a difficult one, as he struggled to find offensive consistency. Through his first 58 games of the season he recorded only four goals and was a healthy scratch on multiple occasions. Conacher's offensive struggles were perhaps magnified by the fact that goaltender Bishop, the player he had been traded for, was playing very well in Tampa Bay and was frequently receiving mention as a Vezina Trophy candidate. On March 4, 2014, the eve of the 2013–14 NHL trade deadline, Conacher was placed on waivers by the Senators. He was subsequently claimed by the Buffalo Sabres on March 5, 2014.

=== Buffalo Sabres ===
The Sabres declined to offer Conacher a contract extension, which allowed him to become a free agent on June 30, 2014. The team was undecided in regard to retaining his rights, only deciding at the last minute to release him.

=== New York Islanders ===
On July 1, 2014, Conacher was signed as a free agent by the New York Islanders on a one-year, $600,000 contract. After playing in 15 of the team's first 29 games, Conacher was placed on waivers by the Islanders on December 12, 2014. He cleared waivers and was assigned to the team's minor league affiliate, Bridgeport Sound Tigers, the following day. On March 2, 2015, Conacher was traded to the Vancouver Canucks, in exchange for Utica Comets player Dustin Jeffrey. He was assigned to their AHL affiliate, the Utica Comets, securing an offensive role to help the club reach the Calder Cup finals.

=== SC Bern ===
On July 1, 2015, Conacher left the NHL as a free agent and signed a two-year contract with Swiss club, SC Bern, of the NLA. In December 2015, he was selected to play for Team Canada at the Spengler Cup and helped win the title, while being named to the tournament's all-star team. He won the National League A title that same season with SC Bern, scoring 5 goals in 14 playoffs games.

=== Tampa Bay Lightning (second stint) ===
On July 13, 2016, Conacher once again signed with the Tampa Bay Lightning to a one-year, one-way contract. On January 29, 2017, Conacher was added to the 2017 American Hockey League All-Star Classic roster. Conacher will represent the Crunch on the North Division All-Star team. On April 6, 2017, Conacher was named to the 2016-17 AHL ALL-Star Second Team. On June 28, 2017, the Lightning announced that it had re-signed Conacher to a two-year, $1.3 million contract extension. On October 17, 2018, the Lightning re-signed Conacher to a one-year contract extension.

=== Lausanne HC ===
On July 28, 2020, Conacher returned to the National League (NL) and agreed to a three-year contract with Lausanne HC. On February 16, 2021, Conacher moved to former club, SC Bern. Conacher signed a new 3-year deal with SCB, keeping him at the club through to the end of the 2022/23 season. On February 23, 2022, SC Bern announced that Conacher would be loaned to HC Ambrì-Piotta for the remainder of the season.

=== Later career ===
After two seasons in Switzerland, and with a desire to play closer to home, Conacher opted to return to North America for the 2022–23 season and signed a professional tryout contract with the Belleville Senators of the AHL, affiliate of former club the Ottawa Senators, on November 1, 2022. Conacher featured in just 2 games with Belleville before suffering a long-term injury in which he was released upon his recovery. On February 22, 2023, Conacher continued in the AHL by signing a PTO with the Charlotte Checkers, affiliate to the Florida Panthers. In playing with the Checkers for the remainder of the season, Conacher collected 9 points through 15 games.

As a free agent, Conacher was again on the move within the AHL, securing a one-year contract with the Chicago Wolves on June 1, 2023. He was later signed to a professional tryout contract to attend the Carolina Hurricanes training camp in preparation for the 2023–24 season on August 29, 2023. In his last professional season, Conacher posted 8 goals and 19 points through 66 regular season games with the Wolves.

== Personal ==
Conacher was born with a bladder exstrophy, a rare condition in which his bladder was outside his body. When he was ten days old he underwent a ten-hour surgical procedure in which doctors reconstructed his pelvis in order to place his bladder back into his body. The situation was so severe that doctors informed his parents that he might never walk properly. Additionally, Conacher was diagnosed with Type 1 Diabetes at the age of eight. When not playing he often has an insulin pump attached to his hip to regulate his blood glucose levels.

Conacher is a distant relative of Hockey Hall of Famers Charlie, Roy, and Lionel Conacher, but despite rumours to the contrary, he is not related to former NHL forward Pat Conacher. Cory Conacher has a younger brother, Shane Conacher, who played for the Adirondack Thunder, and in 2023-24 was playing for the Dundas Real McCoys . Both starred at Canisius College, but were never teammates. Cory graduated in 2011, while Shane matriculated in 2013.

== Post-playing career ==
On July 5, 2024, he became the new owner of the Strathroy Rockets of the Greater Ontario Junior Hockey League.

== Career statistics ==
=== Regular season and playoffs ===
			Regular season					Playoffs
Season	Team	League	GP	G	A	Pts	PIM	GP	G	A	Pts	PIM
2005–06	Burlington Eagles AAA	Midget	48	30	33	63	30	—	—	—	—	—
2006–07	Burlington Cougars	OPJHL	48	22	40	62	62	—	—	—	—	—
2007–08	Canisius College	AHA	20	7	10	17	24	—	—	—	—	—
2008–09	Canisius College	AHA	37	12	23	35	42	—	—	—	—	—
2009–10	Canisius College	AHA	35	20	33	53	36	—	—	—	—	—
2010–11	Canisius College	AHA	37	23	19	42	54	—	—	—	—	—
2010–11	Rochester Americans	AHL	2	1	0	1	2	—	—	—	—	—
2010–11	Cincinnati Cyclones	ECHL	3	5	2	7	0	—	—	—	—	—
2010–11	Milwaukee Admirals	AHL	5	3	2	5	2	7	0	1	1	6
2011–12	Norfolk Admirals	AHL	75	39	41	80	114	18	2	13	15	28
2012–13	Syracuse Crunch	AHL	36	12	16	28	56	—	—	—	—	—
2012–13	Tampa Bay Lightning	NHL	35	9	15	24	16	—	—	—	—	—
2012–13	Ottawa Senators	NHL	12	2	3	5	6	8	3	0	3	31
2013–14	Ottawa Senators	NHL	60	4	16	20	34	—	—	—	—	—
2013–14	Buffalo Sabres	NHL	19	3	3	6	16	—	—	—	—	—
2014–15	New York Islanders	NHL	15	1	2	3	14	—	—	—	—	—
2014–15	Bridgeport Sound Tigers	AHL	28	5	17	22	30	—	—	—	—	—
2014–15	Utica Comets	AHL	20	7	9	16	22	23	5	3	8	28
2015–16	SC Bern	NLA	48	22	30	52	68	14	5	4	9	20
2016–17	Syracuse Crunch	AHL	56	17	43	60	113	22	12	16	28	27
2016–17	Tampa Bay Lightning	NHL	11	1	3	4	4	—	—	—	—	—
2017–18	Syracuse Crunch	AHL	18	7	8	15	36	—	—	—	—	—
2017–18	Tampa Bay Lightning	NHL	36	8	4	12	24	2	0	0	0	10
2018–19	Tampa Bay Lightning	NHL	1	0	0	0	2	—	—	—	—	—
2018–19	Syracuse Crunch	AHL	70	22	42	64	95	4	1	2	3	6
2019–20	Syracuse Crunch	AHL	44	14	24	38	39	—	—	—	—	—
2019–20	Tampa Bay Lightning	NHL	4	0	1	1	4	—	—	—	—	—
2020–21	Lausanne HC	NL	21	9	5	14	20	—	—	—	—	—
2020–21	SC Bern	NL	19	9	13	22	32	6	2	3	5	6
2021–22	SC Bern	NL	36	13	7	20	30	—	—	—	—	—
2021–22	HC Ambrì-Piotta	NL	5	1	3	4	6	—	—	—	—	—
2022–23	Belleville Senators	AHL	2	0	1	1	0	—	—	—	—	—
2022–23	Charlotte Checkers	AHL	15	4	5	9	6	7	2	1	3	2
2023–24	Chicago Wolves	AHL	66	8	11	19	80	—	—	—	—	—
NHL totals			193	28	47	75	118	10	3	0	3	41

Medal record

Ice hockey

Representing Canada

Spengler Cup
Gold medal – first place	2015 Davos	

=== International ===
Year	Team	Event	Result	GP	G	A	Pts	PIM
2015	Canada	SC	1st place, gold medalist(s)	4	2	3	5	4
Senior totals				4	2	3	5	4

== Awards and honours ==
Award	Year
College
All-Atlantic Hockey First Team	2009–10
Atlantic Hockey Player of the Year	2009–10
All-Atlantic Hockey Second Team	2010–11
AHL
Les Cunningham Award	2011–12
Dudley "Red" Garrett Memorial Award	2011–12
All-Rookie Team	2011–12
Second All-Star Team	2011–12, 2016–17
Calder Cup (Norfolk Admirals)	2011–12
All-Star Game	2017, 2019
CCM/AHL Player of the Month (November 2018)	2018–19
NLA
Champion	2015–16

Awards and achievements
Preceded by Jacques Lamoureux	Atlantic Hockey Player of the Year; 2009–10	Succeeded by Paul Zanette
Preceded by Jacques Lamoureux	Atlantic Hockey Regular Season Scoring Trophy; 2009–10	Succeeded by Paul Zanette
Preceded by Luke Adam	AHL Rookie of the Year; 2011–12	Succeeded by Tyler Toffoli
