= Lionel Conacher Jr. =

Canadian football player (1936-2012)

Profile
- Position: Running back

Personal information
- Born: January 8, 1936; Toronto, Ontario, Canada
- Died: November 8, 2012 (aged 76); Toronto, Ontario, Canada
- Listed height: 6 ft 2 in (1.88 m)
- Listed weight: 202 lb (92 kg)

Career information
- University: University of Western Ontario
- CFL draft: 1960: 1st round, 3rd overall pick

Career history
- 1960: Montreal Alouettes

Lionel Conacher Jr. (January 8, 1936 - November 8, 2012) was a Canadian professional football running back in the Canadian Football League (CFL). He is the son of famed Canadian sports legend, Lionel Conacher.

A graduate University of Western Ontario, his selection in the university draft stirred up considerable controversy when the Toronto Argonauts passed him up for Bill Mitchell (who, incidentally, ended up being the 1960 rookie of the year).

Drafted by the Montreal Alouettes, Conacher's career was brief, totalling six games during the 1960 season.

His brother is Brian Conacher, a hockey player who represented Canada at the 1964 Winter Olympics and won a Stanley Cup with the 1967 Toronto Maple Leafs.

Roy Conacher and Charlie Conacher are Lionel's uncle.

Murray Henderson and Pete Conacher are Lionel's cousins.
