= Roy Conacher =

Canadian ice hockey player (1916–1984)

- Hockey Hall of Fame, 1998
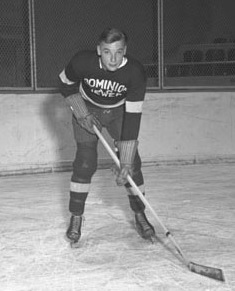
- Conacher with the Toronto Dominions c. 1936
- Born: October 5, 1916 Toronto, Ontario, Canada
- Died: December 29, 1984 (aged 68) Victoria, British Columbia, Canada
- Height: 6 ft 1 in (185 cm)
- Weight: 175 lb (79 kg; 12 st 7 lb)
- Position: Left wing
- Shot: Left
- Played for: Boston Bruins; Detroit Red Wings; Chicago Black Hawks
- Playing career: 1938–1951

Roy Gordon Conacher (October 5, 1916 – December 29, 1984) was a Canadian professional ice hockey player who was a left winger for 11 seasons in the National Hockey League (NHL) for the Boston Bruins, Detroit Red Wings and Chicago Black Hawks. He was the NHL's leading goal-scorer in 1938–39, his first season in the league. Conacher was a member of two Stanley Cup winning teams with the Bruins and scored the championship winning goal in 1939. He won the Art Ross Trophy in 1948–49 season as the NHL's leading point scorer and was named a first team All-Star.

Conacher was a member of the Memorial Cup winning West Toronto Nationals in 1935 as Canadian junior champions and was a member of the Ontario Hockey Association senior champion Toronto Dominions in 1937. Playing in the shadow of his more famous brothers Charlie and Lionel, Roy was known as the "forgotten Conacher". He was posthumously inducted into the Hockey Hall of Fame in 1998, following his brothers to become the only trio of siblings so enshrined.

== Early life ==
Roy Conacher was born October 5, 1916, along with his twin brother Bert, to Benjamin and Elizabeth Conacher. They were the youngest of ten siblings: five boys and five girls. The family grew up in the Toronto neighbourhood of Davenport, which his brother Charlie described as "one of Toronto's higher class slums". His father was a teamster, and struggled to earn enough money to support the family. In the winter, he ploughed the snow off outdoor skating rinks to earn additional money.

All ten children were encouraged to participate in sports by the principal of Jesse Ketchum School, who felt that such pursuits would keep his students from getting into trouble. Roy joined his elder brothers in playing hockey, and having started younger than they had, was regarded as a better skater. Roy went on to join his brothers Lionel and Charlie in professional hockey. Bert was also an aspiring hockey player but his professional hopes were ended when he lost an eye in his late teens to a freak accident while the brothers were playing street hockey in front of their home.

== Playing career ==
=== Amateur ===
Conacher played his minor hockey with the Toronto Marlboro organization and was a member of Ontario provincial championship winning teams at the bantam and midget age groups. He next played junior hockey with the West Toronto Nationals in the Ontario Hockey Association (OHA) junior league between 1933 and 1936. In his third season, 1935–36, Conacher led the OHA junior league in scoring with 12 goals in 10 games. The Nationals, led by Roy and Bert Conacher, won the OHA title and reached the 1936 Memorial Cup final against the Saskatoon Wesleys. In 12 Memorial Cup playoff games, Roy Conacher recorded eight goals and five assists. West Toronto won the best-of-three final in two consecutive games, 5–1 and 4–2, to capture the Dominion junior championship. Conacher played two seasons of senior hockey, first with the Toronto Dominions of the OHA senior league in 1936–37 where he was an all-star for the OHA senior championship winning squad. He then played with then the Kirkland Lake Hargreaves of the Northern Ontario Hockey Association.

=== Boston Bruins ===
The Boston Bruins invited Conacher to their amateur camp in 1935 where the then 17-year-old made a good impression on manager Art Ross. Following his two seasons of senior hockey, the Bruins signed Conacher to a contract on October 23, 1938. He made his National Hockey League (NHL) debut in the 1938–39 season and recorded 37 points in 47 games. Conacher scored four goals in Boston's 8-2 victory of Chicago on February 21, 1939. His 26 goals were the most in the league; it would be 54 years before another rookie, Teemu Selänne, would lead the league. Conacher added ten points in 12 playoff games, including both goals in a 2–0 victory over the Toronto Maple Leafs in the fourth game of the 1939 Stanley Cup Final, and he scored the Stanley Cup-winning goal in the deciding contest.

Conacher remained a leading offensive threat throughout his tenure with Boston; he was one of the NHL's top ten scorers in his first four seasons, including the 1939–40 season despite missing 16 games due to a broken wrist. He also finished second in goals in both 1940–41 and 1941–42 with 24 goals in each campaign. By 1941, he had joined with Eddie Wiseman and Bill Cowley to form the "Three Gun Line", so named because all three players were considered top scoring threats. Conacher had only one goal during the 1941 Stanley Cup playoffs, but the Bruins were the NHL's dominant team and swept the Detroit Red Wings in the Final to win their second Stanley Cup in three years.

In 1942, Conacher left the Bruins to enlist in the Royal Canadian Air Force for the duration of the Second World War where he served as a physical training instructor. He continued to play hockey in the Canadian military leagues, playing first for the Saskatoon RCAF team in 1942–43, then with the Dartmouth RCAF for the following two seasons. He led the Halifax city league with nine goals in 1943–44. Toward the end of the war, Conacher was deployed to England where he continued to play with military teams, but the deployment also meant he was unavailable to return to the Bruins at the start of the 1945–46 season like many of his teammates did. He appeared in only four games late in the season following his discharge from the military.

In 2023 he would be named one of the top 100 Bruins players of all time.

=== Detroit and Chicago ===
Art Ross feared that Conacher would not be able to return to his previous form due to losing four seasons to military service when he was in his physical prime and opted to trade him. Prior to the 1946–47 season, Ross sent Conacher to the Detroit Red Wings in exchange for Joe Carveth. Conacher excelled with Detroit. He led the team with 30 goals and 54 points, seventh best in the league, and scored four goals in one game that were all assisted by Billy Taylor on a night where the latter player set an NHL record with seven assists. Art Ross, once asked what his biggest mistake as a general manager was, replied "trading Roy Conacher".

Conacher became embroiled in a bitter contract dispute with Detroit manager Jack Adams following the season. Adams offered $7,600 for the season, but Conacher refused to sign for less than $8,500. Refusing to bow to his demands, Adams traded Conacher to the New York Rangers on October 22, 1947, in exchange for Edward Slowinski and a player to be named later. Conacher, however, refused to report to the Rangers. He announced instead that he planned to retire from hockey, a decision he claimed to have been mulling over for a couple years. The trade to New York was nullified as a result of Conacher's failure to report. Bill Tobin of the Chicago Black Hawks received permission from Detroit to speak with Conacher and successfully negotiated a deal with the player. Tobin claimed the negotiation was easy: "It wasn't hard to sign Roy. I offered him so much money he couldn't refuse." Tobin did not reveal what he was paying Conacher, but admitted that he spent $25,000 combined on the contract and to purchase him from Detroit.

"He was a man self-effacing, who believed that merit should speak for itself. My father became, at least for one season, certainly the best in the world at what he did. He was driven to that pinnacle by a deeply-rooted motivation – a desire for perfection."

— Conacher's son describes his father at the Hockey Hall of Fame induction ceremony.

Conacher averaged nearly a point per game in 1947–48 with 48 points in 52 games. His best statistical season came in 1948–49 when he won the Art Ross Trophy as the NHL's leading point scorer playing on a line with Bill Mosienko and Doug Bentley on a team that was coached by his brother Charlie. Conacher recorded 68 points while his 26 goals were good enough for second in the league. Additionally, he was named to the first All-Star team at left wing and played in the 1949 All-Star Game. He remained among the league's scoring leaders in 1949–50 as his 56 points were sixth-best in the league. He followed that up by leading the Black Hawks in goals (26) and points (50) in 1950–51. Conacher scored his 200th career goal during the season, at the time a rare feat for an NHL player. However, the physical toll of the sport caught up to him; after playing 12 games of the 1951–52 season, he opted to retire from the NHL. Chicago replaced him with his nephew, Pete Conacher.

== Personal life ==
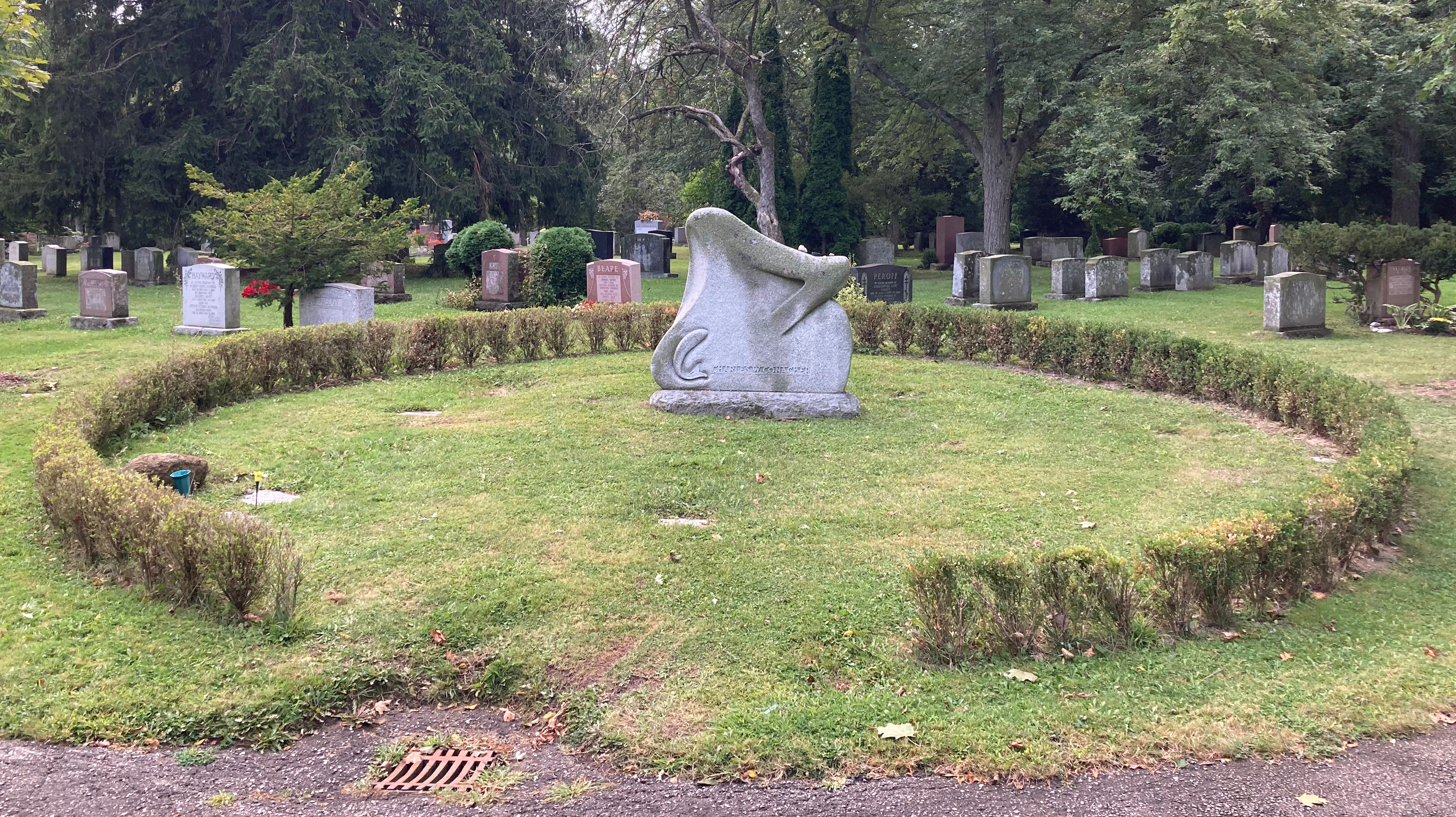
Graves of Roy and Charlie Conacher at Mount Pleasant Cemetery

During his final four seasons in the NHL, Conacher lived in Midland, Ontario. He remained in the community with his wife Fran and children Roy Jr., Mark and Candace. Keeping active in hockey, he coached Midland's junior C team to a provincial championship and regularly played with oldtimers teams. Conacher later moved to Victoria, British Columbia, where, after an eight-year battle with cancer, he died in 1984. He was buried at Mount Pleasant Cemetery, Toronto.

Roy was one of several members of the Conacher family to play in the NHL. Three of his nephews, Pete and Brian Conacher, and Murray Henderson all followed. Cory Conacher is also a distant relative of his. Roy was relatively anonymous compared to his more famous brothers Lionel and Charlie, and was often referred to as the "forgotten Conacher". Roy's career was recognized by the Hockey Hall of Fame in 1998 when he was posthumously inducted by the veterans committee. He joined Charlie (1961) and Lionel (1994) as the only trio of brothers to be so honoured. Lionel Conacher Jr. was a CFL football player.

== Career statistics ==
			Regular season					Playoffs
Season	Team	League	GP	G	A	Pts	PIM	GP	G	A	Pts	PIM
1933–34	West Toronto Nationals	OHA Jr.	6	0	1	1	0	—	—	—	—	—
1934–35	West Toronto Nationals	OHA Jr.	9	4	3	7	8	—	—	—	—	—
1935–36	West Toronto Nationals	OHA Jr.	10	12	3	15	11	5	4	2	6	4
1935–36	West Toronto Nationals	Mem. Cup	—	—	—	—	—	12	8	5	13	11
1936–37	Toronto Dominions	OHA Sr.	8	3	3	6	4	1	0	0	0	0
1937–38	Kirkland Lake Hargreaves	NOHA	14	12	11	23	2	1	1	0	1	0
1938–39	Boston Bruins	NHL	47	26	11	37	12	12	6	4	10	12
1939–40	Boston Bruins	NHL	31	18	12	30	9	6	2	1	3	0
1940–41	Boston Bruins	NHL	41	24	14	38	7	11	1	5	6	4
1941–42	Boston Bruins	NHL	43	24	13	37	12	5	2	1	3	0
1942–43	Saskatoon RCAF	SSHL	20	13	8	21	2	3	2	2	4	0
1943–44	Dartmouth RCAF	NSDHL	3	9	2	11	4	—	—	—	—	—
1944–45	Dartmouth RCAF	NSDHL	4	1	2	3	0	—	—	—	—	—
1945–46	Boston Bruins	NHL	4	2	1	3	0	3	0	0	0	0
1946–47	Detroit Red Wings	NHL	60	30	24	54	6	5	4	4	8	2
1947–48	Chicago Black Hawks	NHL	52	22	27	49	4	—	—	—	—	—
1948–49	Chicago Black Hawks	NHL	60	26	42	68	8	—	—	—	—	—
1949–50	Chicago Black Hawks	NHL	70	25	31	56	16	—	—	—	—	—
1950–51	Chicago Black Hawks	NHL	70	26	24	50	16	—	—	—	—	—
1951–52	Chicago Black Hawks	NHL	12	3	1	4	0	—	—	—	—	—
NHL totals			490	226	200	426	90	42	15	15	30	18

== Awards and honours ==
NHL
Award	Year	Ref.
Art Ross Trophy; Leading scorer	1948–49	
First team All-Star	1948–49	
Played in All-Star Game	1949	
Stanley Cup champion	1938–39; 1940–41	
NHL goal leader	1938-39	

Named one of the top 100 best bruins player of all time.

== See also ==
- List of family relations in the NHL

Preceded by Elmer Lach	Winner of the Art Ross Trophy; 1948–49	Succeeded by Ted Lindsay
