= Pete Conacher =

Canadian ice hockey player (1932–2024)

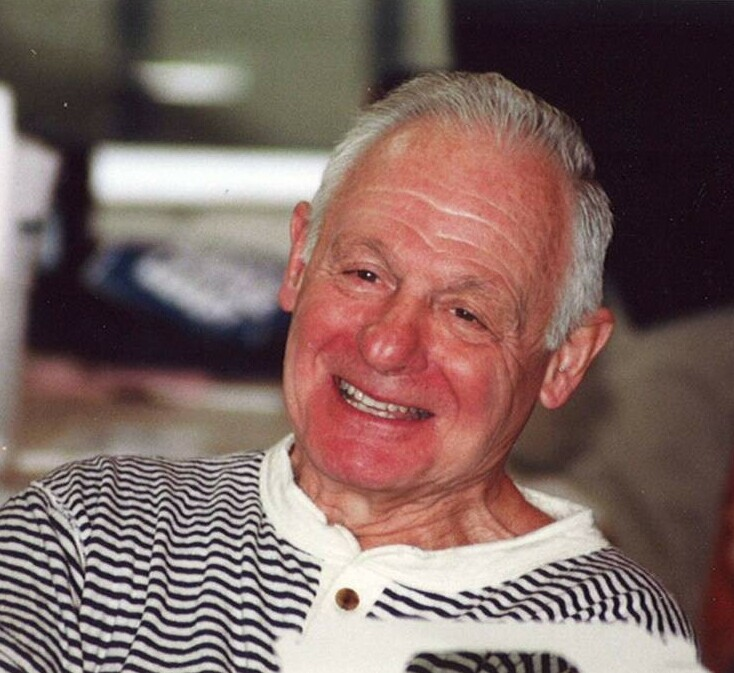
- Conacher in 2010
- Born: July 29, 1932 Toronto, Ontario, Canada
- Died: October 20, 2024 (aged 92)
- Height: 5 ft 10 in (178 cm)
- Weight: 165 lb (75 kg; 11 st 11 lb)
- Position: Left wing
- Shot: Left
- Played for: Toronto Maple Leafs; Chicago Black Hawks; New York Rangers
- National team: Canada
- Playing career: 1951–1966

Charles William "Pete" Conacher Jr. (July 29, 1932 – October 20, 2024) was a Canadian professional ice hockey player who played 229 games in the National Hockey League between 1951 and 1957. The rest of his career lasted from 1951 to 1966 and was mainly spent in the American Hockey League.

Conacher played with the Toronto Maple Leafs, Chicago Black Hawks, and New York Rangers. In 1959, Conacher played for the World Champion Belleville McFarlands. He is the son of NHL Hall of Famer, Charlie Conacher.

== Junior hockey career ==
Pete Conacher began his hockey career in the Toronto Hockey League in 1943 with the Leaside PeeWee team. He went on to play for the North Toronto Kinsmen Terriers in the 1944-45 season; where he would go on to be a Minor Bantam finalist. At the age of 16, he became the property of the Chicago Blackhawks but was sent to their Ontario Hockey Association affiliate, the Galt Black Hawks. He would play in Galt (now part of Cambridge, Ontario) for two seasons. His best offensive season came in 1951-'52 where he would score 120 points (53G, 67A) in 51 games. In 1952, he turned pro with the Chicago Blackhawks to play in the National Hockey League.

== Professional hockey career ==
In his 13 years as a professional hockey player, he played for the New York Rangers, Toronto Maple Leafs, Hershey Bears, St. Louis Flyers, and Buffalo Bisons (AHL). In 1959, he played for the Belleville McFarlands and won the World Championship in Prague. By the end of his professional hockey career, Conacher had played 229 NHL regular season games, with 47 goals and 39 assists.

After ending his professional career in 1966, he joined the NHL Oldtimers Hockey Club, playing charity hockey games across Canada for the following 13 years, and continued to play for the Oldtimers hockey team. Conacher was recognized for his 1959 World Championship success with the Belleville McFarlands by being inducted into the Belleville Hall of Fame.

== Personal life ==
Conacher was also a past President of the Ontario chapter of Special Olympics Canada. During summers he was not playing hockey, he would play in the Beaches Major Fastball League and senior baseball for Lizzies at the old Viaduct Stadium. He also served as a board member for the Charlie Conacher Throat Cancer Research Fund at the Toronto General Hospital. Pete and his wife Ann lived in Etobicoke for over 48 years. He later sat on the Board of Directors with the Ontario Sports Hall of Fame.

Conacher's uncles, Lionel Conacher, and Roy Conacher, also played in the NHL and were later inducted into the Hall of Fame. His cousin, Lionel Conacher Jr., was a first-round draft pick in 1960 for the Montreal Alouettes of the Canadian Football League. Another cousin Brian Conacher represented Canada at the 1964 Winter Olympics and played for the Toronto Maple Leafs, winning a Stanley Cup with them during the 1966–67 NHL season. Cory Conacher, formerly of the Tampa Bay Lightning, is also a distant relative of Pete's. He was also a cousin with Murray Henderson.

Pete Conacher died on October 20, 2024, at the age of 92.

== Career statistics ==
=== Regular season and playoffs ===
| | | | Regular season | | | | | Playoffs |
| Season | Team | League | GP | G | A | Pts | PIM | GP | G | A | Pts | PIM |
|---|---|---|---|---|---|---|---|---|---|---|---|---|
| 1949–50 | Galt Red Wings | OHA | 48 | 25 | 27 | 52 | 22 | — | — | — | — | — |
| 1950–51 | Galt Black Hawks | OHA | 52 | 32 | 32 | 64 | 10 | 3 | 5 | 6 | 11 | 0 |
| 1951–52 | Chicago Black Hawks | NHL | 2 | 0 | 1 | 1 | 0 | — | — | — | — | — |
| 1951–52 | Galt Black Hawks | OHA | 51 | 53 | 67 | 120 | 33 | 3 | 3 | 3 | 6 | 0 |
| 1952–53 | Chicago Black Hawks | NHL | 41 | 5 | 6 | 11 | 7 | 2 | 0 | 0 | 0 | 0 |
| 1952–53 | St. Louis Flyers | AHL | 29 | 12 | 16 | 28 | 6 | — | — | — | — | — |
| 1953–54 | Chicago Black Hawks | NHL | 70 | 19 | 9 | 28 | 23 | — | — | — | — | — |
| 1954–55 | Chicago Black Hawks | NHL | 18 | 2 | 4 | 6 | 2 | — | — | — | — | — |
| 1954–55 | New York Rangers | NHL | 52 | 10 | 7 | 17 | 10 | — | — | — | — | — |
| 1955–56 | New York Rangers | NHL | 41 | 11 | 11 | 22 | 8 | 5 | 0 | 0 | 0 | 0 |
| 1955–56 | Buffalo Bisons | AHL | 18 | 17 | 15 | 32 | 6 | — | — | — | — | — |
| 1956–57 | Buffalo Bisons | AHL | 60 | 26 | 29 | 55 | 16 | — | — | — | — | — |
| 1957–58 | Toronto Maple Leafs | NHL | 5 | 0 | 1 | 1 | 5 | — | — | — | — | — |
| 1957–58 | Buffalo Bisons | AHL | 48 | 12 | 32 | 44 | 2 | — | — | — | — | — |
| 1958–59 | Belleville McFarlands | OHA Sr | 1 | 0 | 0 | 0 | 0 | — | — | — | — | — |
| 1959–60 | Buffalo Bisons | AHL | 56 | 5 | 10 | 15 | 16 | — | — | — | — | — |
| 1960–61 | Hershey Bears | AHL | 69 | 11 | 24 | 35 | 4 | 8 | 1 | 2 | 3 | 4 |
| 1961–62 | Hershey Bears | AHL | 70 | 27 | 29 | 56 | 16 | 7 | 2 | 0 | 2 | 5 |
| 1962–63 | Hershey Bears | AHL | 70 | 29 | 24 | 53 | 6 | 15 | 5 | 4 | 9 | 0 |
| 1963–64 | Hershey Bears | AHL | 72 | 34 | 26 | 60 | 12 | 6 | 0 | 3 | 3 | 2 |
| 1964–65 | Hershey Bears | AHL | 63 | 34 | 24 | 58 | 10 | 15 | 8 | 2 | 10 | 4 |
| 1965–66 | Hershey Bears | AHL | 60 | 14 | 20 | 34 | 4 | — | — | — | — | — |
| AHL totals | | | 615 | 221 | 249 | 470 | 98 | 51 | 16 | 11 | 27 | 15 |
| NHL totals | | | 229 | 47 | 39 | 86 | 55 | 7 | 0 | 0 | 0 | 0 |

=== International ===
| Year | Team | Event | GP | G | A | Pts | PIM |
|---|---|---|---|---|---|---|---|
| 1959 | Canada | WC | 8 | 7 | 3 | 10 | 2 |
| Senior totals | | | 8 | 7 | 3 | 10 | 2 |

== Awards and honours ==
- Belleville Hall of Fame
- Province of Ontario Special Achievement Award (1991)
- Ontario Special Olympics Hall of Fame (First Inductee, 1992)
- Queen Elizabeth II Golden Jubilee Medal (2002)
- Etobicoke Sports Hall of Fame (2002)
- Bobby Orr Hall of Fame (2010)
