= Pat Conacher =

Canadian ice hockey player (born 1959)

- Born: May 1, 1959 (age 67) Edmonton, Alberta, Canada
- Height: 5 ft 8 in (173 cm)
- Weight: 188 lb (85 kg; 13 st 6 lb)
- Position: Centre
- Shot: Left
- Played for: New York Rangers; Edmonton Oilers; New Jersey Devils; Los Angeles Kings; Calgary Flames; New York Islanders
- National team: Canada
- NHL draft: 76th overall, 1979; New York Rangers
- Playing career: 1979–1996

Patrick John Conacher (born May 1, 1959) is a Canadian former ice hockey forward. He last played with the Canada men's national ice hockey team during the 1997–98 season.

Conacher who was born in Edmonton, Alberta, started his National Hockey League (NHL) career with the New York Rangers in 1980. He also played for the Edmonton Oilers, New Jersey Devils, Los Angeles Kings, Calgary Flames, and New York Islanders. He left the NHL after the 1996 season. He won the Stanley Cup in 1984 with the Edmonton Oilers.

Conacher was the first player in NHL history to complete the Hudson River triple, by serving as a member of the Rangers, Islanders and Devils franchises.

On July 26, 2011, he was named the new head coach of the WHL's Regina Pats, a position he held until August 2013 when he accepted the position as the general manager for the Utica Comets of the AHL.

Conacher was an amateur scout with the Vancouver Canucks from 2019 to 2022.

== Family ==
On March 4, 2014, following the trade of Roberto Luongo to the Florida Panthers, Conacher's son, Pat Conacher, Jr., was employed as a back-up goaltender by the Vancouver Canucks in an NHL game against the Phoenix Coyotes.

Pat Conacher is not related to the family of Lionel Conacher.

== Awards and achievements ==
- 1983–84 Stanley Cup champion with the Edmonton Oilers

== Career statistics ==
=== Regular season and playoffs ===
			Regular season					Playoffs
Season	Team	League	GP	G	A	Pts	PIM	GP	G	A	Pts	PIM
1977–78	Billings Bighorns	WCHL	72	31	44	75	105	20	15	14	29	22
1978–79	Billings Bighorns	WHL	39	25	37	62	50	—	—	—	—	—
1978–79	Saskatoon Blades	WHL	33	15	32	47	37	11	1	7	8	4
1979–80	New Haven Nighthawks	AHL	53	11	14	25	43	7	1	1	2	4
1979–80	New York Rangers	NHL	17	0	5	5	4	3	0	1	1	2
1981–82	Springfield Indians	AHL	77	23	22	45	38	—	—	—	—	—
1982–83	New York Rangers	NHL	5	0	1	1	4	1	0	0	0	0
1982–83	Tulsa Oilers	CHL	63	29	28	57	44	—	—	—	—	—
1983–84	Edmonton Oilers	NHL	45	2	8	10	31	3	1	0	1	2
1983–84	Moncton Alpines	AHL	28	7	16	23	30	—	—	—	—	—
1984–85	Nova Scotia Oilers	AHL	68	20	45	65	44	6	3	2	5	0
1985–86	Maine Mariners	AHL	69	15	30	45	83	5	1	1	2	11
1985–86	New Jersey Devils	NHL	2	0	2	2	2	—	—	—	—	—
1986–87	Maine Mariners	AHL	56	12	14	26	47	—	—	—	—	—
1987–88	Utica Devils	AHL	47	14	33	47	32	—	—	—	—	—
1987–88	New Jersey Devils	NHL	24	2	5	7	12	17	2	2	4	14
1988–89	New Jersey Devils	NHL	55	7	5	12	14	—	—	—	—	—
1989–90	Utica Devils	AHL	57	13	36	49	53	—	—	—	—	—
1989–90	New Jersey Devils	NHL	19	3	3	6	4	5	1	0	1	10
1990–91	Utica Devils	AHL	4	0	1	1	6	—	—	—	—	—
1990–91	New Jersey Devils	NHL	49	5	11	16	27	7	0	2	2	2
1991–92	New Jersey Devils	NHL	44	7	3	10	16	7	1	1	2	4
1992–93	Los Angeles Kings	NHL	81	9	8	17	20	24	6	4	10	6
1993–94	Los Angeles Kings	NHL	77	15	13	28	71	—	—	—	—	—
1994–95	Los Angeles Kings	NHL	48	7	9	16	12	—	—	—	—	—
1995–96	Los Angeles Kings	NHL	35	5	2	7	18	—	—	—	—	—
1995–96	Calgary Flames	NHL	7	0	0	0	0	—	—	—	—	—
1995–96	New York Islanders	NHL	13	1	1	2	0	—	—	—	—	—
NHL totals			521	63	76	139	235	67	11	10	21	40
