= Brian Conacher =

Canadian ice hockey player

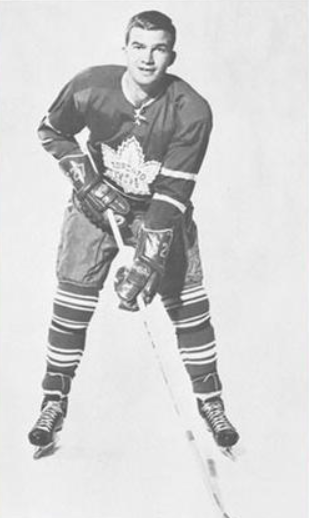
- Conacher in 1960s photo
- Born: August 31, 1941 (age 85) Toronto, Ontario, Canada
- Height: 6 ft 3 in (191 cm)
- Weight: 187 lb (85 kg; 13 st 5 lb)
- Position: Centre
- Shot: Left
- Played for: Toronto Maple Leafs; Detroit Red Wings; Ottawa Nationals
- Playing career: 1962–1976

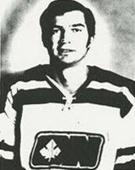
Conacher in 1972 photo for Ottawa Nationals

Brian Kennedy Conacher (born August 31, 1941) is a Canadian former professional ice hockey player, coach, executive, and broadcaster. Conacher played 155 games in the National Hockey League (NHL) with the Toronto Maple Leafs and Detroit Red Wings between 1961 and 1972, winning the Stanley Cup with Toronto in 1967. He later played one season in the World Hockey Association (WHA) with the Ottawa Nationals in 1972–73. In the mid-1960s Conacher was reinstated as an amateur player and joined the Canada national team, playing at the 1964 Winter Olympics. He later served as a coach in the minor North American Hockey League, and general manager of both the Indianapolis Racers and Edmonton Oilers in the WHA. He was the manager of Maple Leaf Gardens until 1998. Conacher also held the position of Chief Executive Officer of the Royal Agricultural Winter Fair.

== Personal information ==
Conacher is the son of Lionel Conacher, who was voted Canada's top athlete for the first half of the century. He was educated at Toronto's Upper Canada College.

His brother, Lionel Jr., was a professional Canadian football player.

Charlie Conacher and Roy Conacher are Brian's uncles.

He is the cousin of Murray Henderson and Pete Conacher.

== Playing career ==
Conacher played on the Canadian Olympic hockey team coached by Father David Bauer at the 1964 Winter Olympics at Innsbruck, Austria. He was also a player for the Toronto Maple Leafs, playing full seasons during the 1967 and 1968 campaigns. He won the Stanley Cup with the Maple Leafs in 1967. In 1968, he played in the NHL All-Star Game, though not as an All-Star but as a member of the Toronto Maple Leafs (in those years, the current Stanley Cup Champion played the All-Star team). Brian was notable in that game as one of only two players to wear a helmet. After 1968, he was relegated, once again, to the minor leagues, until he finally finished his NHL career with a final season with the Detroit Red Wings in 1971–72. He then decided to try out the new World Hockey Association, joining the Ottawa Nationals for a season.

== Coaching career ==
After retiring as a player, Conacher had a few small coaching stints in the minor leagues before becoming the general manager of the WHA Indianapolis Racers, and then the same position in 1977–78 with the WHA Edmonton Oilers.

Conacher was also a part-time coach with Upper Canada College. Some of the students he coached became collegiate and/or professional hockey players: Syl Apps III, Jason Cipolla (played with the St. John's Maple Leafs), Andre Faust (Philadelphia Flyers), Mike McKee (Quebec Nordiques), and NHL first-round pick Daniel Tkaczuk.

== Broadcasting career ==
As a broadcaster, Conacher was most notable as fellow UCC graduate Foster Hewitt's colour man during the 1972 Summit Series. He also teamed with Curt Gowdy to call hockey for the U.S. coverage of the 1976 Winter Olympics on ABC.

== Career statistics ==
=== Regular season and playoffs ===
			Regular season					Playoffs
Season	Team	League	GP	G	A	Pts	PIM	GP	G	A	Pts	PIM
1958–59	Toronto Marlboros	OHA	6	0	1	1	0	3	0	2	2	0
1959–60	Toronto Marlboros	OHA	42	17	17	34	2	3	0	0	0	2
1960–61	Toronto Marlboros	OHA	14	2	5	7	7	—	—	—	—	—
1961–62	Toronto Marlboros	MTJAHL	25	12	27	39	4	12	7	8	15	18
1961–62	Rochester Americans	AHL	3	0	0	0	2	—	—	—	—	—
1961–62	Toronto Maple Leafs	NHL	1	0	0	0	0	—	—	—	—	—
1962–63	University of Western Ontario	CIAU	—	—	—	—	—	—	—	—	—	—
1963–64	Canada National Team	Intl	—	—	—	—	—	—	—	—	—	—
1964–65	Canada National Team	Intl	—	—	—	—	—	—	—	—	—	—
1965–66	Toronto Maple Leafs	NHL	2	0	0	0	2	—	—	—	—	—
1965–66	Rochester Americans	AHL	69	14	16	30	66	12	6	0	6	18
1966–67	Toronto Maple Leafs	NHL	66	14	13	27	47	12	3	2	5	21
1967–68	Toronto Maple Leafs	NHL	64	11	14	25	31	—	—	—	—	—
1967–68	Rochester Americans	AHL	5	2	2	4	6	—	—	—	—	—
1968–69	Canada National Team	Intl	—	—	—	—	—	—	—	—	—	—
1969–70	Canada National Team	Intl	—	—	—	—	—	—	—	—	—	—
1970–71	Canada National Team	Intl	—	—	—	—	—	—	—	—	—	—
1971–72	Detroit Red Wings	NHL	22	3	1	4	4	—	—	—	—	—
1971–72	Fort Worth Wings	CHL	40	13	13	26	4	7	3	2	5	4
1972–73	Ottawa Nationals	WHA	69	8	19	27	32	5	1	3	4	4
1975–76	Mohawk Valley Comets	NAHL	3	2	1	3	2	—	—	—	—	—
WHA totals			69	8	19	27	32	5	1	3	4	4
NHL totals			155	28	28	56	84	12	3	2	5	21

=== International ===
Year	Team	Event	GP	G	A	Pts	PIM
1964	Canada	OLY	7	7	1	8	6
1965	Canada	WC	7	1	3	4	6
Senior totals			14	8	4	12	10

Preceded by Bep Guidolin	General Manager of the Edmonton Oilers; 1977–78	Succeeded by Larry Gordon
