= Charlie Conacher =

Canadian ice hockey player (1909–1967)

- Hockey Hall of Fame, 1961
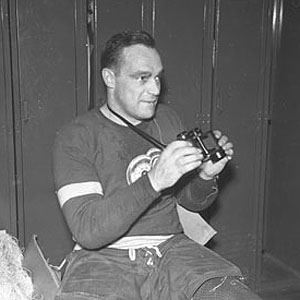
- Born: December 20, 1909 Toronto, Ontario, Canada
- Died: December 30, 1967 (aged 58) Toronto, Ontario, Canada
- Height: 6 ft 1 in (185 cm)
- Weight: 195 lb (88 kg; 13 st 13 lb)
- Position: Right wing
- Shot: Right
- Played for: Toronto Maple Leafs; Detroit Red Wings; New York Americans
- Playing career: 1929–1941

Charles William "Big Bomber" Conacher Sr. (December 20, 1909 – December 30, 1967) was a Canadian professional ice hockey forward who played for the Toronto Maple Leafs, Detroit Red Wings and New York Americans in the National Hockey League (NHL). An early power forward, Conacher was nicknamed "the Big Bomber", for his size, powerful shot and goal scoring. He led the NHL five times in goals, twice led in overall scoring and won the Stanley Cup once. Over five seasons from 1931-32 to 1935-36 Conacher was named to three NHL First All-Star Teams and two NHL Second All-Star Teams. He is an Honoured Member of the Hockey Hall of Fame. In 2013, Charlie Conacher was inducted into the Ontario Sports Hall of Fame. In 2017 Conacher was named one of the "100 Greatest NHL Players" in history.

== Junior career ==
Conacher played three years of junior hockey, most notably with the Toronto Marlboros. Playing with future Maple Leafs teammate Harvey "Busher" Jackson, he achieved staggering scoring numbers, leading the Marlboros to the Memorial Cup playoffs in 1928 and 1929. In 28 playoff games with the Marlies in those two seasons, Conacher scored 50 goals, including 28 goals in the 1929 playoffs to lead his team to a Memorial Cup championship, its first of six eventual titles.

== Professional career ==
Signed the next season by the Maple Leafs with Busher Jackson, Toronto manager Conn Smythe paired the two with former farmhand Joe Primeau. The trio, nicknamed the "Kid Line" for their inexperience - Primeau was 23, Conacher and Jackson both 18 - became an immediate sensation in Toronto, as Conacher scored his first NHL goal in Toronto's opening 2-2 tie with the Chicago Black Hawks on November 14. Although he missed six games at the end of the season with an infected hand, he finished the season with 20 goals.

The following season, Conacher broke into the elite of the league, despite missing a number of games due to a reinjured hand. He scored 31 goals - the first of five times he led the league in goal scoring - and finishing third overall in points to Howie Morenz and Ebbie Goodfellow. Primeau finished 6th in league scoring as well, and Jackson 15th.

The 1932 season saw the team move into the new Maple Leaf Gardens. In return for Black Hawk Johnny Gottselig, whom Smythe coveted, Chicago asked for Conacher and star defenceman King Clancy for compensation, to which Smythe reportedly cabled that Santa Claus lived at the North Pole, not in Maple Leaf Gardens. Once again, Conacher missed time with a broken hand, during which a curious incident took place. League rules stated that a player receiving a third major penalty in the season would receive a one-game suspension. Conacher had two at the time of his injury, but he was dressed by coach Irvin. According to another league rule, any player jumping on the ice while his team was at full strength received a major penalty, and Irvin had Conacher do so, thus triggering his automatic suspension for a game in which he could not play anyway. With Dick Irvin the new coach of the Leafs, the Kid Line shone, leading Toronto to a Stanley Cup championship. Jackson led the league in scoring, Primeau was second and Conacher - used sparingly after his return from his injury - fourth, while once again leading the league in goals and being named to the Second All-Star Team, his best game coming in an 11-3 romp over the New York Americans in which he scored five goals.

A broken collarbone sidelined Conacher for weeks in the 1933 season - the only one in a six-year stretch in which he failed to lead the league in goals - but he was once again named to the Second All-Star Team at right wing.

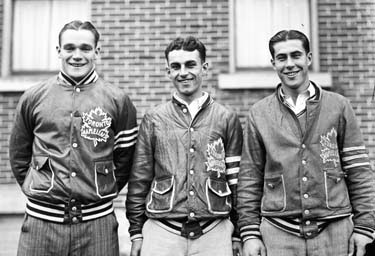
The Kid Line, featuring Conacher, Joe Primeau and Busher Jackson

The next three seasons saw Conacher cemented among the top players in the game, as he regained his form and led the league in goal scoring all three seasons and in points in 1934 and 1935, being named First Team All-Star all three seasons, years in which the Leafs finished as runner-up in the Stanley Cup finals. Things would change in 1937; Primeau and Clancy retired, while Conacher broke a wrist in training camp, an injury initially thought not serious. However, Conacher would only play 15 games that season and 19 the next after suffering a dislocated shoulder, as chronic injuries caught up to him, and he never again regained his form.

The Detroit Red Wings, seeking to improve their team, purchased Conacher in the fall of 1939 for a sum reported to be $16,000, and contingent on him remaining in good health. While he finished fourth on the Wings in scoring with 23 points, his days as a superstar were over. He was optioned the following season to the New York Americans, where he played his final two seasons paired on defence with former Montreal Maroons star Hooley Smith. The Amerks, who had loaded up with once-great players like Conacher, Smith, Busher Jackson, Eddie Shore and Nels Stewart, were notably slow and finished in last place both seasons, although Conacher played credibly, finished 3rd and 5th respectively in team scoring and serving as the Americans' captain both years. Only 30, Conacher retired after the 1941 season.

== Retirement and legacy ==
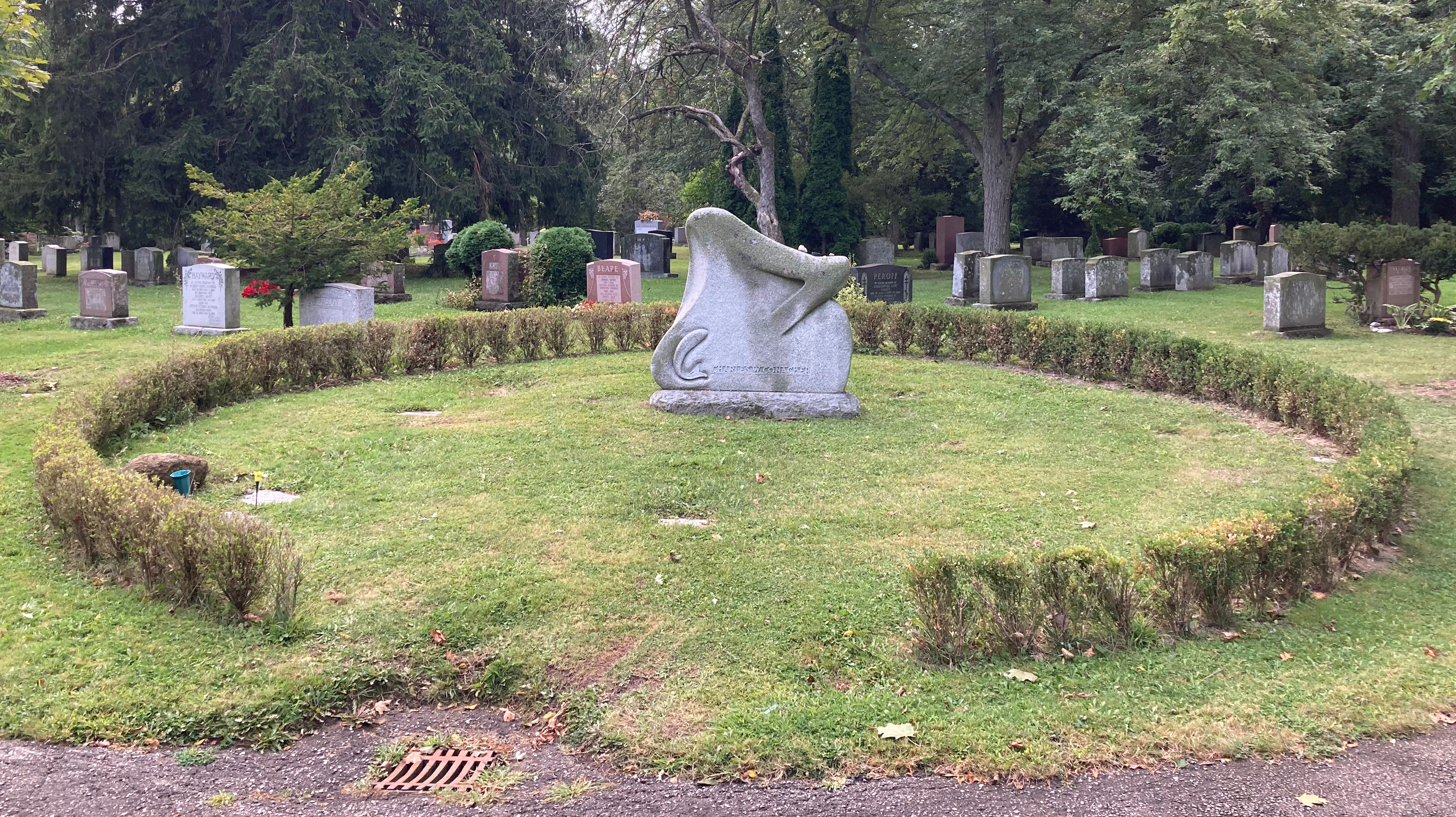
Graves of Charlie and Roy Conacher at Mount Pleasant Cemetery

After his retirement, Conacher went into coaching, meeting with remarkable success: he led the junior league Oshawa Generals of the Ontario Hockey Association to four straight OHA Championships between 1941 and 1944, as well as three straight Eastern Canada amateur championships in 1942, 1943 and 1944, and the Memorial Cup Championship in 1944. The Generals finished in second place in both 1946 and 1947 - coincidentally, losing in both seasons to the St. Michael's College Majors, coached by his old linemate Joe Primeau.

After resigning from his coaching post in Oshawa, Conacher was named to replace Johnny Gottselig as coach of the Chicago Black Hawks 28 games into the 1949 season. As a coach, Conacher was involved in a notable altercation when Detroit Times writer Lew Walter tried to interview him after the Red Wings defeated Chicago 9–2 on February 8, 1950. Conacher, who exploded in anger, criticized Walter's past stories and punched Walter, knocking him down to the floor. Walter announced that he would seek a warrant for Conacher's arrest. NHL president Clarence Campbell took a dim view of Conacher's actions and fined him $200. Conacher then phoned Walter and apologized, saying he regretted what had taken place. Over his three seasons at the helm, Conacher coached the Black Hawks - a team on which his younger brother Roy played - to 6th, 5th and 6th-place finishes respectively, after which he was fired in favor of Ebbie Goodfellow.

Conacher had nine siblings, including Hockey Hall of Famers Lionel Conacher and Roy Conacher. His son, Pete Conacher, played in the NHL, as did nephews Brian Conacher and Murray Henderson. He was inducted into the Hockey Hall of Fame in 1961 and, later, to Canada's Sports Hall of Fame in 1975. In 1998, he was ranked number 36 on The Hockey News' list of the 100 Greatest Hockey Players. Lionel's son, Lionel Jr. was a CFL football player.

Conacher died in 1967 of throat cancer just ten days after his 58th birthday, and was buried in the Mount Pleasant Cemetery, Toronto.

The Charlie Conacher Humanitarian Award was an award named after Conacher. It was given out to the NHL player who best exhibited outstanding humanitarian and public services contributions, and was awarded from 1968 to 1984.

== Career statistics ==
			Regular season					Playoffs
Season	Team	League	GP	G	A	Pts	PIM	GP	G	A	Pts	PIM
1926–27	North Toronto Juniors	OHA-Jr.	9	9	1	10	—	1	0	0	0	0
1926–27	North Toronto Rangers	OHA-Sr.	2	1	0	1	2	—	—	—	—	—
1927–28	Toronto Marlboros	OHA-Jr.	9	11	0	11	—	2	1	0	1	—
1927–28	Toronto Marlboros	OHA-Sr.	1	2	0	2	0	—	—	—	—	—
1927–28	Toronto Marlboros	M-Cup	—	—	—	—	—	11	15	3	18	—
1928–29	Toronto Marlboros	OHA-Jr.	8	18	3	21	—	2	7	0	7	—
1928–29	Toronto Marlboros	M-Cup	—	—	—	—	—	15	28	8	36	12
1929–30	Toronto Maple Leafs	NHL	38	20	9	29	48	—	—	—	—	—
1930–31	Toronto Maple Leafs	NHL	37	31	12	43	78	2	0	1	1	0
1931–32	Toronto Maple Leafs	NHL	44	34	14	48	66	7	6	2	8	6
1932–33	Toronto Maple Leafs	NHL	40	14	19	33	64	9	1	1	2	10
1933–34	Toronto Maple Leafs	NHL	42	32	20	52	38	5	2	3	5	0
1934–35	Toronto Maple Leafs	NHL	47	36	21	57	24	7	1	4	5	6
1935–36	Toronto Maple Leafs	NHL	44	23	15	38	74	9	2	3	5	12
1936–37	Toronto Maple Leafs	NHL	15	3	5	8	13	2	0	0	0	5
1937–38	Toronto Maple Leafs	NHL	19	7	9	16	6	—	—	—	—	—
1938–39	Detroit Red Wings	NHL	40	8	15	23	39	5	2	5	7	2
1939–40	New York Americans	NHL	47	10	18	28	41	3	1	1	2	8
1940–41	New York Americans	NHL	46	7	16	23	32	—	—	—	—	—
NHL totals			459	225	173	398	523	49	17	18	35	49

== Coaching record ==
Team	Year	Regular season						Post season
Team	Year	G	W	L	T	Pts	Division rank	Result
CHI	1947–48	32	13	15	4	30	6th in NHL	DNQ
CHI	1948–49	60	21	31	8	50	5th in NHL	DNQ
CHI	1949–50	70	22	38	10	54	6th in NHL	DNQ
Total		162	56	84	22	134		

== See also ==
- Notable families in the NHL
- List of ice hockey line nicknames
- List of players with 5 or more goals in an NHL game

== Footnotes ==
Preceded by Hap Day	Toronto Maple Leafs captain 1937–38	Succeeded by Red Horner
Preceded by Cooney Weiland	NHL Scoring Champion; 1931, 1932	Succeeded by Bill Cook
Preceded by Bill Cook	NHL Scoring Champion; 1934, 1935, 1936	Succeeded by Sweeney Schriner
Preceded by Sweeney Schriner	New York Americans captain 1939–41	Succeeded by Tommy Anderson
Preceded by Johnny Gottselig	Head coach of the Chicago Black Hawks; 1948–50	Succeeded by Ebbie Goodfellow
