= Lionel Conacher =

Canadian athlete and politician (1900–1954)

Lionel Conacher MP
- Hockey Hall of Fame, 1994
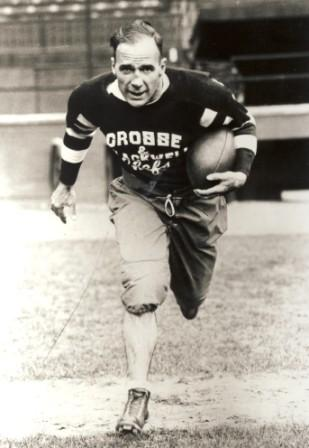
- Born: May 24, 1900 Toronto, Ontario, Canada
- Died: May 26, 1954 (aged 54) Ottawa, Ontario, Canada
- Height: 6 ft 2 in (188 cm)
- Weight: 194 lb (88 kg; 13 st 12 lb)
- Position: Defence
- Shot: Left
- Played for: Pittsburgh Pirates; New York Americans; Montreal Maroons; Chicago Black Hawks
- Playing career: 1925–1937

Member of Parliament for Trinity
- In office June 27, 1949 – May 26, 1954
- Preceded by: Larry Skey
- Succeeded by: Donald Carrick

Member of Provincial Parliament for Bracondale
- In office October 6, 1937 – August 3, 1943
- Preceded by: Arthur Russell Nesbitt
- Succeeded by: Rae Luckock

Personal details
- Party: Liberal

Military service
- Allegiance: Canada
- Branch/service: Royal Canadian Air Force
- Years of service: 1942–1943
- Rank: Honorary squadron leader

Lionel Pretoria Conacher MP (/ˈkɒnəkər/ KON-ə-kər; May 24, 1900 – May 26, 1954), nicknamed "the Big Train", was a Canadian athlete and politician. Voted the country's top athlete of the first half of the 20th century, he won championships in numerous sports. His first passion was Canadian football; he was a member of the 1921 Grey Cup champion Toronto Argonauts. He was also a member of the Toronto Maple Leafs baseball team that won the International League championship in 1926. In hockey, he won the Memorial Cup in 1920, and the Stanley Cup twice: with the Chicago Black Hawks in 1934 and the Montreal Maroons in 1935. Additionally, he won wrestling, boxing and lacrosse championships during his playing career. He is one of three players, including Joe Miller and Carl Voss, to have their names engraved on both the Grey Cup and Stanley Cup.

Conacher retired as an athlete in 1937 to enter politics. He won election to the Legislative Assembly of Ontario in 1937, and in 1949 won a seat in the House of Commons. Many of his political positions revolved around sports. He worked to eliminate corruption in boxing while serving as a member of provincial parliament (MPP) in Ontario, also serving as the chairman of the Ontario Athletic Commission. Additionally, he served a term as director of recreation and entertainment for the Royal Canadian Air Force. It was also on the sports field that Conacher died: He suffered a heart attack twenty minutes after hitting a triple in a softball game played on the lawn of Parliament Hill.

Numerous organizations have honoured Conacher's career. In addition to being named Canada's athlete of the half-century, he was named the country's top football player over the same period. He was inducted into Canada's Sports Hall of Fame in 1955, the Canadian Football Hall of Fame in 1964, the Canadian Lacrosse Hall of Fame in 1965, the Hockey Hall of Fame in 1994, and the Ontario Sports Hall of Fame in 1996. Additionally, the Canadian Press gives the Lionel Conacher Award to its male athlete of the year.

== Early life ==
Conacher was born in Toronto, Ontario, on May 24, 1900. His middle name was given after the South African city of Pretoria, where British Empire troops including Canadians were fighting the Boer War at the time of his birth. He was the eldest son of Benjamin and Elizabeth Conacher, and the third of ten children overall. He had four brothers and five sisters. The family grew up in the neighbourhood of Davenport, which his brother Charlie described as "one of Toronto's higher class slums". His father was a teamster, and struggled to earn enough money to support the family. In the winter, he ploughed the snow off outdoor skating rinks to earn additional money. Conacher left school after grade eight to go to work and help support his siblings. For ten hours a day, he hauled sod, earning an extra dollar a week for his family.

All ten children were encouraged to participate in sports by the principal of Jesse Ketchum School, who felt that such pursuits would keep his students from getting into trouble. Conacher discovered that he was among the better players in any sport he tried, and quickly became a star at Canadian football, ice hockey and lacrosse. He realized his athletic ability could offer an escape from poverty.

== Amateur career ==
Conacher was a prolific athlete, excelling in numerous sports at the same time. He played with 14 different teams during his teenage years, winning 11 championships. In his youth, he played for Canadian Sports Hall of Fame coach, Bob Abate, and starred on Abate's Elizabeth Playground teams. He was 16 years old when he won the Ontario lightweight wrestling championship, and at 20 won the Canadian amateur light-heavyweight boxing championship. In 1921, he fought, and was knocked out by heavyweight champion Jack Dempsey in an exhibition match. One year he famously hit a triple to win the Toronto city baseball championship, then rushed to the other side of the city to find his lacrosse team trailing 3–0 in the Ontario provincial final. He scored four goals and an assist to lead them to a comeback victory.

=== Football ===
Rugby football was the first sport Conacher played, and it was his favourite. He first played organized football at the age of 12 as a middle wing with the Capitals in the Toronto Rugby Football League. He played four seasons with the team between 1912 and 1915, during which the Capitals won the city championship each year. He won the Ontario championship as a junior with the Toronto Central YMCA in 1918, and in 1919 moved up to the intermediate level. With the intermediate Capitals, he was moved into an offensive role as a halfback. He excelled in the role, and his team reached Ontario Rugby Football Union (ORFU) final. In that final, the Capitals' opponents from Sarnia made stopping Conacher their priority, a strategy that proved the difference as Sarnia won the championship.

Conacher moved to the senior level in 1920 with the Toronto Rugby Club where his team again won the ORFU championship, but lost the eastern semifinal to the Toronto Argonauts of the Interprovincial Rugby Football Union (IRFU). His play impressed the Argonauts, who signed him for the 1921 season. In his first game with the Argonauts, he scored 23 of the team's 27 points, and led the IRFU in scoring, accounting for 14 touchdowns and 90 of his team's 167 points as they went undefeated in six games. The Argonauts won the eastern championship, and faced the Edmonton Eskimos in the first east–west Grey Cup championship in Canadian history. Conacher rushed for 211 yards and scored 15 points in Toronto's 23–0 victory to claim the national title.

Named captain in 1922, Conacher led the Argonauts to another undefeated season in IRFU play, finishing with five wins and one tie, as he rushed for about 950 yards. The Argonauts reached the Eastern final, but lost to Queen's University, 12–11. In that game, Conacher was the entire Argonaut offence, rushing 35 times for 227 yards but Pep Leadley's 21-yard field goal towards the end of the game gave Queens' its victory.

=== Ice hockey ===
The expense of playing hockey initially kept Conacher off the ice. He did not learn to skate until he was 16. Consequently, hockey was among his weakest sports. He played with the Toronto Century Rovers, and then the Aura Lee Athletic Club, but saw limited ice time. Determined to improve his game, he closely watched the top players from the bench and sought to emulate what made them successful. His efforts paid off, and by 1918–19, was considered a star defenceman for Aura Lee. He joined the Toronto Canoe Club Paddlers, a team of all-star calibre players in 1919–20, and with them won the Memorial Cup, Canada's national junior championship. Conacher then returned to the Aura Lees to play for their senior team for two years.

National Hockey League (NHL) teams took notice of Conacher's ability. The Toronto St. Pats offered him $3,000 a season – three times the average salary – to play for them in 1920–21, while in 1921, the Montreal Canadiens offered $5,000 and support setting up a business. He turned both down as he was not yet willing to surrender his status as an amateur athlete. His decisions to refuse the offers led to speculation that he was being paid under the table. He and Billy Burch were accused of deliberately throwing a game in 1922, but were absolved of guilt by the Amateur Athletic Union of Canada.

=== Move to Pittsburgh ===
Conacher remained in senior hockey and while playing for the North Toronto Seniors in 1923, was a part of the first hockey game broadcast on radio. That summer, he received an offer from Roy Schooley, the manager of the Duquesne Garden and owner of the Pittsburgh Yellow Jackets of the United States Amateur Hockey Association (USAHA), to play for his team. While he would retain his amateur status, Schooley set Conacher up with a job in the insurance business and paid his university tuition so that he could improve his education. He brought many of his teammates with him to Pittsburgh, Pennsylvania, all of whom received jobs in the community, and he attended school at Bellefonte Academy for a year before enrolling at Duquesne University.

He played football for both schools in the fall, and served as the Yellow Jackets' captain in the winter where he led the team to consecutive USAHA titles in 1924 and 1925. In the summers, Conacher returned to Toronto and played lacrosse and baseball. The Yellow Jackets turned professional in 1925 when they were renamed the Pittsburgh Pirates and joined the National Hockey League (NHL). Conacher finally chose to turn professional with the team, a decision that surprised fans and teammates in Toronto, who knew of his favouritism for the game of football.

== Professional career ==
Conacher as a member of the Montreal Maroons

Conacher scored the first goal in Pirates history on American Thanksgiving Day Thursday November 26, 1925, against the Boston Bruins. He scored nine goals in 33 games in 1925–26, then returned to Toronto to play professional baseball with the Toronto Maple Leafs. An outfielder on the team, Conacher and the Maple Leafs won the International League championship then defeated the Louisville Colonels to win the Little World Series.

He returned to Pittsburgh for the 1926–27 NHL season, but was dealt early in the year to the New York Americans in exchange for Charlie Langlois and $2,000. The trade nearly proved disastrous for Conacher. He scored 8 goals in 1926–27 and improved to 11 in 1927–28, but playing for a team owned by notorious bootlegger Bill Dwyer resulted in his becoming a heavy drinker. Conacher served as player-coach in 1929–30, but his play and health had deteriorated. Two events in that off-season saved Conacher: he swore off alcohol completely upon the birth of his first child, and his playing rights were sold to the Montreal Maroons.

Conacher periodically struggled with Montreal, and at one point was placed on waivers with no other team willing to take over his contract. Nonetheless, his overall play and point totals increased for three consecutive seasons with the Maroons, peaking at 28 points in 1932–33. He was named to the second All-Star team that season, but was traded to the Chicago Black Hawks in exchange for Teddy Graham. Conacher was a key figure in the club's first Stanley Cup victory that season. He finished second to the Canadiens' Aurel Joliat in the voting for the Hart Trophy and earned a spot on the NHL's first All-Star team.

On Wednesday October 3, 1934, Conacher was involved in one of the largest transactions in league history. He was dealt to the Montreal Canadiens, along with Leroy Goldsworthy and Roger Jenkins in exchange for Montreal superstar Howie Morenz, Lorne Chabot and Marty Burke. The deal was only part of a series of trades involving four teams that represented one of the biggest deals in NHL history. Immediately following the Chicago trade, Conacher was sent back to the Maroons, along with Herb Cain, in exchange for the rights to Nelson Crutchfield. Conacher spent his last three NHL seasons with the Maroons and won his second Stanley Cup in 1935. He ended his hockey career after the team was eliminated from the playoffs by the New York Rangers on April 23, 1937. That final year he was runner-up to Babe Siebert in the 1937 Hart Trophy voting and was placed on the NHL second All-Star team.

=== Canadian professional football ===
Conacher in 1934

Conacher had not played competitive football since turning professional. At one point he was offered a position as coach of the Montreal AAA Winged Wheelers, but disappointed the Interprovincial Rugby Football Union club when he turned down the job due to his other commitments. He was not absent from the game long, however, as Conacher returned to football in 1933. He was part of an effort to launch a new professional league that would feature both Canadian and American teams. The league never came to fruition, but Conacher organized what became the first professional football team in Canada. He captained the team, based out of Toronto, which was known as the Crosse and Blackwell Chefs following a sponsorship with a local food products company. Conacher recruited former amateur players who had likewise left the sport in favour of paying jobs in other pro sports, including his brother Charlie.

The first game was held Thanksgiving Day in 1933, an exhibition contest against the Rochester Arpeakos. A crowd of 10,000 attended the game to watch Conacher play his first competitive football game in Canada in ten years. He did not disappoint, scoring two touchdowns and setting up a third for the Chefs, and was hailed as the game's star despite an 18–15 loss. Toronto lost a return match in Rochester, but in the third and final game of their season, the Chefs defeated a team from Buffalo at Toronto by a score of 18–0. Conacher was again the star, rushing for two touchdowns and scoring 13 of his team's points. He organized the team for a second year in 1934, known as the Wrigley Aromints due to new sponsorship, and again played an exhibition schedule as the team remained unaffiliated with any league. The team again played three games, winning all three. However, at the age of 34 years, Conacher found that the game was too hard on his body physically, and neither he nor his team returned for a third season.

=== Lacrosse ===
Led by the owners of the Montreal Canadiens, the arena operators of Canada's NHL teams invented the sport of box lacrosse in 1931 in a bid to fill arena dates in the summer. The field variant of the sport had been in decline in Canada as the popularity of baseball and football grew, and it was hoped that lacrosse played in the confines of a hockey rink would create a faster, more exciting game. A summer professional circuit, the International Professional Lacrosse League was created with representative teams of the Montreal Maroons, Montreal Canadiens, Toronto Maple Leafs and an entry from Cornwall, Ontario. Several NHL players who had played the field game before abandoning it to turn professional in hockey signed with the teams, including Conacher, who joined the Maroons. The Maroons' inaugural game came against the Maple Leafs, and though Toronto won 9–7, Conacher stole the spotlight from the victors. He scored six of Montreal's goals, assisted on the seventh, and earned the praise of his fellow players. When the Maroons went to Toronto, the Maple Leafs hosted a "Lionel Conacher Night" to celebrate the city's native son. The Maroons did not figure into the playoff for the championship, but Conacher led the league in scoring with 107 points. His dominance in the league was such that his total nearly doubled his nearest rival, who finished with 56 points. In one game, against Toronto, he scored ten goals in a 17–12 victory. He chose not to return to lacrosse for the 1932 season, choosing instead to sign a contract to wrestle professionally during the hockey off-seasons.

== Political career ==
=== Bracondale ===
When Conacher retired from professional hockey, he ran as a Liberal in the 1937 Ontario general election. He was elected as a Member of Provincial Parliament (MPP) representing the Toronto Bracondale electoral district in the Ontario Legislative Assembly, defeating the district's incumbent, Conservative Arthur Russell Nesbitt. Bracondale had a colourful electoral past, and this election night was no different. The October 6 election was a very close race between Nesbitt and Conacher.

Conacher represented Bracondale from October 6, 1937, until June 30, 1943, when the Legislature was dissolved for the 1943 Ontario general election. He was challenged for the Liberal nomination in Bracondale by Toronto city alderman E. C. Bogart. Bogart won and then lost the seat to the Co-operative Commwealth's Rae Luckock a few weeks later.

Conacher also served as the sports director for the Royal Canadian Air Force (RCAF) during World War II. He and Canadian Amateur Hockey Association past-president George Dudley, announced plans for military teams based at all RCAF commands across Canada to play in senior ice hockey leagues.

=== Trinity ===
In the 1945 Canadian general election, Conacher represented the Liberal Party of Canada for a seat in the House of Commons of Canada, where he came second in Toronto's Trinity electoral district, losing to the Progressive Conservative incumbent. He ran again in Trinity for the Liberals in the 1949 Canadian general election, and this time he was elected. He was re-elected for a final time in the 1953 election. Conacher was a friend of Justice Walter Robb, the chairman of the Ontario Liquor Licensing board. Conacher came to be influenced by the gangster Johnny Papalia as the police informer Marvin Elkind recalled in 2011: "In those days, getting a liquor license was like printing money. Very few places had them. They were difficult to get and you had to get to Judge Robb. You just couldn't go to Judge Robb yourself and pay him off. You had to go through somebody.. Smirle Lawson was one of his contacts. Charlie Conacher was one of his contracts. So if you wanted a liquor license in a bar or something, you would get to Judge Robb through these certain guys".

In the spring of 1954 Conacher was in Ottawa attending to his parliamentary duties when he was asked to play in the annual softball game between MPs and members of the parliamentary press gallery. On May 26, in the sixth inning, in his last at-bat-ever, he hit a long drive into left field, stretching a single into a triple, when he sprinted to third base. He stood, breathing heavily and then collapsed face-first from having been hit in the head with a pitch in an earlier inning. One of the other MPs was a doctor who tried to assist him, but there was little that could be done for Conacher and within twenty minutes he was pronounced dead. The next day Conacher was supposed to attend his daughter's graduation from the University of Toronto. A big funeral was held, and his brother Charlie flew in from England to be there. He was buried at St. John's York Mills Anglican Church Cemetery in Toronto.

== Awards ==
He was named Canada's Greatest Male Athlete of the Half-Century (1950). In 1981 the Pro Football Researchers Association called Conacher "Canada's Answer to Jim Thorpe". He is a member of the Canadian Sports Hall of Fame (1955), the Canadian Football Hall of Fame (1963), the Canadian Lacrosse Hall of Fame (1966), and Hockey Hall of Fame (1994). The award for the Canadian Press Canadian male athlete of the year is called the Lionel Conacher Award.

== Family ==
Conacher's younger brothers, Charlie Conacher, and Roy Conacher, were also Hall of Fame hockey players. His namesake, Lionel Jr., was a first round draft pick in 1960 and played a season with the Montreal Alouettes of the Canadian Football League. His son Brian Conacher represented Canada at the 1964 Winter Olympics and played for the Toronto Maple Leafs, winning a Stanley Cup with them in 1966–67 NHL season. Pete Conacher, Lionel's nephew and the son of Charlie, also played in the NHL, as did another nephew of Lionel's, Murray Henderson, who was the son of Lionel's sister Catherine. Former NHL player Cory Conacher is also a distant relative of Lionel's.

== Career statistics ==
=== Ice hockey ===
			Regular season					Playoffs
Season	Team	League	GP	G	A	Pts	PIM	GP	G	A	Pts	PIM
1916–17	Toronto Century Rovers	Minor-ON	—	—	—	—	—	—	—	—	—	—
1917–18	Toronto Aura Lee	OHA-Jr.	—	—	—	—	—	—	—	—	—	—
1918–19	Parkdale Canoe Club	OHA-Jr.	—	—	—	—	—	—	—	—	—	—
1919–20	Toronto Canoe Club	OHA-Jr.	—	—	—	—	—	12	21	9	30	—
1920–21	Toronto Aura Lee	OHA-Sr.	10	3	2	5	—	—	—	—	—	—
1921–22	Toronto Aura Lee	OHA-Sr.	20	7	2	9	—	2	2	0	2	0
1922–23	North Toronto A. A.	OHA-Int.	—	—	—	—	—	—	—	—	—	—
1923–24	Pittsburgh Yellow Jackets	USAHA	20	12	4	16	—	13	6	3	9	—
1924–25	Pittsburgh Yellow Jackets	USAHA	40	14	0	14	—	8	5	0	5	—
1925–26	Pittsburgh Pirates	NHL	33	9	4	13	64	—	—	—	—	—
1926–27	Pittsburgh Pirates	NHL	10	0	0	0	12	—	—	—	—	—
1926–27	New York Americans	NHL	30	8	9	17	81	—	—	—	—	—
1927–28	New York Americans	NHL	30	11	6	17	82	—	—	—	—	—
1928–29	New York Americans	NHL	44	5	2	7	132	2	0	0	0	10
1929–30	New York Americans	NHL	39	4	6	10	73	—	—	—	—	—
1930–31	Montreal Maroons	NHL	35	4	3	7	57	2	0	0	0	2
1931–32	Montreal Maroons	NHL	46	7	9	16	60	4	0	0	0	2
1932–33	Montreal Maroons	NHL	47	7	21	28	61	2	0	1	1	0
1933–34	Chicago Black Hawks	NHL	48	10	13	23	87	8	2	0	2	4
1934–35	Montreal Maroons	NHL	40	2	6	8	44	7	0	0	0	14
1935–36	Montreal Maroons	NHL	47	7	7	14	65	3	0	0	0	0
1936–37	Montreal Maroons	NHL	45	6	19	25	64	5	0	1	1	2
NHL totals			494	80	105	185	882	33	2	2	4	34

== NHL coaching record ==
Team	Year	Regular season						Postseason
Team	Year	G	W	L	T	Pts	Division rank	Result
New York Americans	1929–30	44	14	25	5	33	5th in Canadian	Missed playoffs

== See also ==
- List of Canadian sports personalities

Sporting positions
Preceded by None	Pittsburgh Pirates captain 1925–26	Succeeded by Harold Cotton
Preceded by Tommy Gorman	Head coach of the New York Americans; 1929–30	Succeeded by Eddie Gerard
Preceded by Hooley Smith	Montreal Maroons captain 1936–37	Succeeded by Stewart Evans
