= List of New York Americans players =

This is a list of players who have played at least one game for the New York Americans (1925–1941) and Brooklyn Americans (1941–42) of the National Hockey League (NHL). This list does not include players for the Quebec Bulldogs (1919–20) and Hamilton Tigers (1920–1925).

== Key ==
- Hockey Hall of Famer

Abbreviations
BRK	Brooklyn Americans
NYA	New York Americans
BOTH	Both teams
C	Center
D	Defenseman
L	Left wing
R	Right wing

Goaltenders
W	Wins
L	Losses
T	Ties
SO	Shutouts
GAA	Goals against average
SV%	Save percentage

Skaters
GP	Games played
G	Goals
A	Assists
Pts	Points
PIM	Penalty minutes

The "Seasons" column lists the first year of the season of the player's first game and the last year of the season of the player's last game. For example, a player who played one game in the 2000–2001 season would be listed as playing with the team from 2000–2001, regardless of what calendar year the game occurred within.

== Skaters ==
				Regular season					Playoffs				
Player	Team	Position	Years	GP	G	A	Pts	PIM	GP	G	A	Pts	PIM
Viv Allen	NYA	R	1940–1941	6	0	1	1	0	—	—	—	—	—
Tom Anderson	BOTH	L	1935–1942	292	57	125	182	164	16	2	7	9	8
Murray Armstrong	BOTH	C	1939–1942	140	32	56	88	33	3	0	0	0	0
Ossie Asmundson	NYA	C	1936–1937	1	0	0	0	0	—	—	—	—	—
Vern Ayres	NYA	D	1930–1933	119	4	5	9	233	—	—	—	—	—
Marty Barry (1965)	NYA	C	1927–1928	9	1	0	1	2	—	—	—	—	—
Red Beattie	NYA	L	1937–1939	36	3	4	7	10	6	2	2	4	2
Frank Beisler	NYA	D	1936–1940	2	0	0	0	0	—	—	—	—	—
Bill Benson	BOTH	C	1940–1942	67	11	25	36	35	—	—	—	—	—
Rene Boileau	NYA	C	1925–1926	7	0	0	0	0	—	—	—	—	—
Buzz Boll	BOTH	L	1939–1942	142	28	39	67	57	1	0	0	0	0
Edmond Bouchard	NYA	L	1925–1929	113	6	2	8	51	—	—	—	—	—
Billy Boucher	NYA	R	1927–1928	43	5	2	7	58	—	—	—	—	—
Clarence Boucher	NYA	D	1926–1928	47	2	2	4	133	—	—	—	—	—
Billy Boyd	NYA	R	1929–1930	43	7	6	13	16	—	—	—	—	—
Andy Branigan	BOTH	D	1940–1942	27	1	2	3	31	—	—	—	—	—
Punch Broadbent (1962)	NYA	R	1928–1929	44	1	4	5	59	2	0	0	0	2
Bill Brydge	NYA	D	1929–1936	296	18	47	65	371	—	—	—	—	—
Billy Burch (1974)	NYA	C	1925–1932	282	90	44	134	229	2	0	0	0	0
Eddie Burke	NYA	R	1932–1935	90	26	20	46	43	—	—	—	—	—
Roy Burmister	NYA	L	1929–1932	67	4	3	7	2	—	—	—	—	—
Billy Cameron	NYA	R	1925–1926	21	0	0	0	0	—	—	—	—	—
Earl Campbell	NYA	D	1925–1926	29	1	0	1	6	—	—	—	—	—
Lorne Carr	NYA	R	1934–1941	330	99	101	200	95	16	4	2	6	2
Frank Carson	NYA	R	1930–1931	44	6	7	13	36	—	—	—	—	—
Murph Chamberlain	BRK	L	1941–1942	11	6	9	15	16	—	—	—	—	—
Art Chapman	NYA	C	1933–1940	279	39	144	183	74	16	1	4	5	0
Jack Church	BRK	D	1941–1942	15	1	3	4	10	—	—	—	—	—
Charlie Conacher (1961)	NYA	R	1939–1941	93	17	34	51	73	3	1	1	2	8
Lionel Conacher (1994)	NYA	D	1926–1930	149	28	23	51	368	2	0	0	0	10
Red Conn	NYA	L	1933–1935	96	9	28	37	22	—	—	—	—	—
Harry Connor	NYA	L	1928–1929	43	6	2	8	83	2	0	0	0	2
Bob Connors	NYA	L	1926–1927	6	1	0	1	0	—	—	—	—	—
Eddie Convey	NYA	L	1930–1933	36	1	1	2	33	—	—	—	—	—
Chuck Corrigan	NYA	R	1940–1941	16	2	2	4	2	—	—	—	—	—
Baldy Cotton	NYA	L	1935–1937	74	9	9	18	50	5	0	1	1	9
Les Cunningham	NYA	C	1936–1937	23	1	8	9	19	—	—	—	—	—
Hap Day (1961)	NYA	D	1937–1938	43	0	3	3	14	6	0	0	0	0
John Doran	NYA	D	1933–1937	85	5	7	12	94	3	0	0	0	0
Duke Dutkowski	NYA	D	1930–1934	69	5	9	14	66	—	—	—	—	—
Red Dutton (1958)	NYA	D	1930–1936	276	14	41	55	432	3	0	0	0	0
Babe Dye (1970)	NYA	R	1928–1929	42	1	0	1	17	2	0	0	0	0
Pat Egan	BOTH	D	1939–1942	97	16	32	48	181	2	0	0	0	4
Hap Emms	NYA	L	1930–1938	183	14	22	36	152	—	—	—	—	—
Wilf Field	BOTH	D	1936–1942	171	13	21	34	119	2	0	0	0	2
Tommy Filmore	NYA	R	1931–1933	65	9	10	19	21	—	—	—	—	—
Lloyd Finkbeiner	NYA	L	1940–1941	2	0	0	0	0	—	—	—	—	—
Johnny Gagnon	NYA	R	1939–1940	24	4	3	7	0	1	1	0	1	0
John Gallagher	NYA	D	1936–1939	98	4	11	15	48	8	0	2	2	6
Leroy Goldsworthy	NYA	R	1938–1939	48	3	11	14	10	2	0	0	0	0
Bob Gracie	NYA	C	1933–1935	38	6	7	13	14	—	—	—	—	—
Ted Graham	NYA	D	1936–1937	31	2	1	3	30	—	—	—	—	—
Red Green	NYA	L	1925–1928	118	29	9	38	162	—	—	—	—	—
Shorty Green (1963)	NYA	R	1925–1927	53	8	5	13	57	—	—	—	—	—
Lloyd Gross	NYA	L	1933–1934	21	7	3	10	10	—	—	—	—	—
Len Grosvenor	NYA	C	1931–1932	12	0	0	0	0	—	—	—	—	—
Bob Hall	NYA	L	1925–1926	8	0	0	0	0	—	—	—	—	—
Tony Hemmerling	NYA	L	1935–1937	22	3	3	6	4	—	—	—	—	—
Fred Hergerts	NYA	C	1934–1936	20	2	4	6	2	—	—	—	—	—
Red Heron	BRK	C	1941–1942	11	0	1	1	2	—	—	—	—	—
Orville Heximer	NYA	L	1934–1935	17	5	2	7	0	—	—	—	—	—
Mel Hill	BRK	R	1941–1942	47	14	23	37	10	—	—	—	—	—
Normie Himes	NYA	C	1926–1935	402	106	113	219	127	2	0	0	0	0
Bill Holmes	NYA	C	1926–1930	43	5	4	9	33	—	—	—	—	—
Albert Hughes	NYA	C	1930–1932	60	6	8	14	22	—	—	—	—	—
Fred Hunt	NYA	R	1940–1941	15	2	5	7	0	—	—	—	—	—
Art Jackson	NYA	C	1938–1939	48	12	13	25	15	2	0	0	0	2
Busher Jackson (1971)	NYA	L	1939–1941	89	20	26	46	14	3	0	1	1	2
Lloyd Jackson	NYA	C	1936–1937	14	1	1	2	0	—	—	—	—	—
Walter Jackson	NYA	L	1932–1935	82	16	11	27	18	—	—	—	—	—
Roger Jenkins	NYA	R	1936–1939	53	2	5	7	10	—	—	—	—	—
Ed Jeremiah	NYA	R	1931–1932	9	0	1	1	0	—	—	—	—	—
Joe Jerwa	NYA	D	1935–1939	162	22	46	68	197	13	2	3	5	12
Ivan Johnson (1958)	NYA	D	1937–1938	31	0	0	0	10	6	0	0	0	2
Walter Kalbfleish	NYA	D	1935–1937	10	0	0	0	6	5	0	0	0	2
John Keating	NYA	L	1931–1933	35	5	5	10	17	—	—	—	—	—
Pep Kelly	BRK	R	1941–1942	8	1	0	1	0	—	—	—	—	—
Pete Kelly	BOTH	R	1940–1942	18	3	6	9	6	—	—	—	—	—
Wally Kilrea	NYA	R	1931–1932	48	3	8	11	18	—	—	—	—	—
Lloyd Klein	NYA	L	1932–1938	151	28	24	52	63	5	0	0	0	2
Nick Knott	BRK	D	1941–1942	14	3	1	4	9	—	—	—	—	—
Joe Krol	BRK	L	1941–1942	24	9	3	12	8	—	—	—	—	—
Gord Kuhn	NYA	R	1932–1933	12	1	1	2	4	—	—	—	—	—
Newsy Lalonde (1950)	NYA	C	1926–1927	1	0	0	0	2	—	—	—	—	—
Joe Lamb	NYA	R	1931–1938	121	18	20	38	144	—	—	—	—	—
Charlie Langlois	NYA	R	1925–1927	45	11	1	12	84	—	—	—	—	—
Norm Larson	BOTH	R	1940–1942	88	25	18	43	12	—	—	—	—	—
Pete Leswick	NYA	L	1936–1937	1	1	0	1	0	—	—	—	—	—
Gus Marker	BRK	R	1941–1942	17	2	5	7	2	—	—	—	—	—
Ron Martin	NYA	R	1932–1934	94	13	16	29	36	—	—	—	—	—
Charlie Mason	NYA	R	1937–1938	2	0	0	0	0	—	—	—	—	—
George Massecar	NYA	L	1929–1932	100	12	11	23	46	—	—	—	—	—
Hazen McAndrew	BRK	D	1941–1942	7	0	1	1	6	—	—	—	—	—
Bert McInenly	NYA	L	1931–1932	30	12	6	18	44	—	—	—	—	—
Alex McKinnon	NYA	R	1925–1928	120	10	7	17	134	—	—	—	—	—
Charley McVeigh	NYA	C	1928–1935	311	66	77	143	105	2	0	0	0	2
John Morrison	NYA	L	1925–1926	18	0	0	0	0	—	—	—	—	—
Ken Mosdell	BRK	C	1941–1942	41	7	9	16	16	—	—	—	—	—
Allan Murray	NYA	D	1933–1940	271	5	9	14	163	14	0	0	0	10
Mike Neville	NYA	C	1930–1931	19	1	0	1	2	—	—	—	—	—
Peanuts O'Flaherty	BOTH	R	1940–1942	21	5	1	6	0	—	—	—	—	—
Harry Oliver (1967)	NYA	R	1934–1937	112	18	26	44	18	5	1	2	3	0
George Patterson	NYA	L	1929–1934	157	42	17	59	149	—	—	—	—	—
Merlyn Phillips	NYA	C	1932–1933	30	1	7	8	10	—	—	—	—	—
Hal Picketts	NYA	R	1933–1934	48	3	1	4	32	—	—	—	—	—
Ellie Pringle	NYA	D	1930–1931	6	0	0	0	0	—	—	—	—	—
Yip Radley	NYA	D	1930–1931	1	0	0	0	0	—	—	—	—	—
Ken Randall	NYA	R	1925–1927	37	4	2	6	94	—	—	—	—	—
Bill Regan	NYA	D	1932–1933	15	1	1	2	14	—	—	—	—	—
Gord Reid	NYA	D	1936–1937	1	0	0	0	2	—	—	—	—	—
Leo Reise Sr.	NYA	D	1926–1930	151	19	8	27	118	2	0	0	0	0
Mickey Roach	NYA	C	1925–1927	69	14	0	14	18	—	—	—	—	—
Doc Romnes	NYA	L	1939–1940	15	0	1	1	0	—	—	—	—	—
Sam Rothschild	NYA	L	1927–1928	5	0	0	0	4	—	—	—	—	—
Sweeney Schriner (1962)	NYA	L	1934–1939	240	92	121	213	73	13	4	1	5	32
Laurie Scott	NYA	L	1926–1927	39	6	2	8	22	—	—	—	—	—
Chuck Shannon	NYA	D	1939–1940	4	0	0	0	2	—	—	—	—	—
Johnny Sheppard	NYA	L	1928–1933	179	42	36	78	120	2	0	0	0	0
Al Shields	NYA	D	1931–1937	75	7	1	8	124	—	—	—	—	—
Jack Shill	NYA	C	1937–1938	22	1	3	4	10	—	—	—	—	—
Eddie Shore (1947)	NYA	D	1939–1940	10	2	3	5	9	3	0	2	2	2
Joe Simpson (1963)	NYA	D	1925–1931	228	21	19	40	156	2	0	0	0	0
Peter Slobodian	NYA	D	1940–1941	41	3	2	5	54	—	—	—	—	—
Alex Smith	NYA	D	1934–1935	48	3	8	11	46	—	—	—	—	—
Hooley Smith (1972)	NYA	C	1937–1941	183	27	36	63	86	11	3	4	7	16
John Sorrell	NYA	L	1937–1941	143	31	33	64	25	11	4	3	7	4
Chris Speyer	NYA	D	1933–1934	9	0	0	0	0	—	—	—	—	—
Jesse Spring	NYA	D	1928–1929	23	0	0	0	0	—	—	—	—	—
Wilf Starr	NYA	C	1932–1933	26	4	3	7	8	—	—	—	—	—
Nels Stewart (1952)	NYA	C	1935–1940	209	75	68	143	125	16	3	5	8	6
Bill Summerhill	BRK	R	1941–1942	16	5	5	10	18	—	—	—	—	—
Joe Thorsteinson	NYA	R	1932–1933	4	0	0	0	0	—	—	—	—	—
Fred Thurier	BOTH	C	1940–1942	30	9	8	17	4	—	—	—	—	—
Jack Tomson	NYA	D	1939–1941	15	1	1	2	0	2	0	0	0	0
Carl Voss	NYA	C	1935–1936	46	3	9	12	10	5	0	0	0	0
Nick Wasnie	NYA	R	1932–1933	48	11	12	23	36	—	—	—	—	—
Harry Watson	BRK	L	1941–1942	47	10	8	18	6	—	—	—	—	—
Tex White	NYA	R	1928–1929	13	2	1	3	8	2	0	0	0	2
Hub Wilson	NYA	L	1931–1932	2	0	0	0	0	—	—	—	—	—
Eddie Wiseman	NYA	R	1935–1940	214	61	83	144	75	12	2	5	7	10
Ralph Wycherley	BOTH	L	1940–1942	28	4	7	11	6	—	—	—	—	—

== Goaltenders ==
			Regular season							Playoffs					
Player	Team	Years	GP	W	L	T	SO	GAA	SV%	GP	W	L	SO	GAA	SV%
Lorne Chabot	NYA	1936–1937	6	2	3	1	1	4.05	—	—	—	—	—	—	—
Alec Connell (1958)	NYA	1933–1934	1	1	0	0	0	3.00	—	—	—	—	—	—	—
Abbie Cox	NYA	1933–1934	1	0	1	0	0	7.50	—	—	—	—	—	—	—
Jake Forbes	NYA	1925–1933	105	36	59	10	12	2.31	—	—	—	—	—	—	—
Benny Grant	NYA	1929–1934	12	4	8	0	1	3.49	—	—	—	—	—	—	—
Joe Ironstone	NYA	1925–1926	1	0	0	0	0	4.50	—	—	—	—	—	—	—
Percy Jackson	NYA	1933–1934	1	0	1	0	0	9.00	—	—	—	—	—	—	—
Dave Kerr	NYA	1931–1932	1	0	1	0	0	6.00	—	—	—	—	—	—	—
Joe Miller	NYA	1927–1928	28	8	16	4	5	2.68	—	—	—	—	—	—	—
Alfie Moore	NYA	1936–1939	20	7	13	0	1	3.80	—	2	0	2	0	3.00	—
Chuck Rayner (1973)	BOTH	1940–1942	48	15	28	5	1	3.46	—	—	—	—	—	—	—
Moe Roberts	NYA	1931–1934	7	2	4	0	0	3.94	—	—	—	—	—	—	—
Earl Robertson	BOTH	1937–1942	190	60	95	34	16	2.92	—	9	4	5	0	1.92	—
Flat Walsh	NYA	1928–1929	4	2	0	2	3	0.23	—	—	—	—	—	—	—
Alex Wood	NYA	1936–1937	1	0	1	0	0	2.57	—	—	—	—	—	—	—
Roy Worters (1969)	NYA	1928–1937	360	118	170	71	45	2.37	—	7	2	4	3	1.60	—

== See also ==
- List of NHL players
