= Norman Collings =

Canadian ice hockey player

- Born: May 6, 1910 Bradford, Ontario, Canada
- Died: October 6, 1975 (aged 65)
- Height: 6 ft 2 in (188 cm)
- Weight: 175 lb (79 kg; 12 st 7 lb)
- Position: Left wing
- Shot: Left
- Played for: Montreal Canadiens
- Playing career: 1930–1938

Norman Edward "Norm, Dodger" Collings (May 6, 1910 – October 6, 1975) was a Canadian professional ice hockey left winger who played in one National Hockey League game for the Montreal Canadiens during the 1934–35 season, on January 1, 1935 against the New York Americans. The rest of his career, which lasted from 1930 to 1938, was spent in the minor leagues. He died in 1975 and is buried in Mount Pleasant Cemetery in Bradford, Ontario Canada.

== Career statistics ==
=== Regular season and playoffs ===
			Regular season					Playoffs
Season	Team	League	GP	G	A	Pts	PIM	GP	G	A	Pts	PIM
1927–28	Newmarket Redmen	OHA	—	—	—	—	—	—	—	—	—	—
1928–29	West Toronto Redmen	OHA	2	1	0	1	—	3	2	0	2	—
1929–30	West Toronto Nationals	OHA	3	4	1	5	0	2	0	1	1	0
1929–30	West Toronto Nationals	M-Cup	—	—	—	—	—	12	8	7	15	6
1930–31	Minneapolis Millers	AHA	25	3	1	4	2	—	—	—	—	—
1931–32	New Haven Eagles	Can-Am	37	6	5	11	10	2	1	0	1	0
1932–33	New Haven Eagles	Can-Am	27	7	8	15	6	—	—	—	—	—
1932–33	Philadelphia Arrows	Can-Am	15	4	7	11	2	5	0	0	0	4
1933–34	Philadelphia Arrows	Can-Am	35	5	12	17	26	2	0	1	1	0
1934–35	Montreal Canadiens	NHL	1	0	1	1	0	—	—	—	—	—
1934–35	Philadelphia Arrows	Can-Am	44	7	15	22	29	—	—	—	—	—
1935–36	New Haven Eagles	Can-Am	34	3	9	12	15	—	—	—	—	—
1937–38	Tulsa Oilers	AHA	36	7	9	16	21	4	0	1	1	2
Can-Am totals			192	32	56	88	88	9	1	1	2	4
NHL totals			1	0	1	1	0	—	—	—	—	—

== See also ==
- List of players who played only one game in the NHL
