= 1929–30 New York Rangers season =

NHL hockey team season

1929–30 New York Rangers
- Division: 3rd American
- 1929–30 record: 17–17–10
- Home record: 11–5–6
- Road record: 6–12–4
- Goals for: 136
- Goals against: 143

Team information
- General manager: Lester Patrick
- Coach: Lester Patrick
- Captain: Bill Cook
- Arena: Madison Square Garden

Team leaders
- Goals: Bill Cook (29)
- Assists: Frank Boucher (36)
- Points: Frank Boucher (62)
- Penalty minutes: Ching Johnson (82)
- Wins: John Ross Roach (17)
- Goals against average: John Ross Roach (3.10)

The 1929–30 New York Rangers season was the franchise's fourth season. In the regular season, the Rangers finished third in the American Division with a 17–17–10 record. New York qualified for the Stanley Cup playoffs, where the Rangers defeated the Ottawa Senators 6–3 in a two-game, total-goals series, but lost to the Montreal Canadiens 2–0 in the semi-finals.

== Regular season ==
=== Final standings ===
American Division
	GP	W	L	T	GF	GA	PTS
**Boston Bruins**	44	38	5	1	179	98	**77**
**Chicago Black Hawks**	44	21	18	5	117	111	**47**
**New York Rangers**	44	17	17	10	136	143	**44**
Detroit Cougars	44	14	24	6	117	133	**34**
Pittsburgh Pirates	44	5	36	3	102	185	**13**

Note: GP = Games Played, W = Wins, L = Losses, T = Ties, Pts = Points, GF = Goals For, GA = Goals Against
Teams that qualified for the playoffs are highlighted in bold.

=== Record vs. opponents ===
==== Vs. American Division ====
1929–30 NHL records
Team	**BOS**	**CHI**	**DET**	**NYR**	**PIT**	**Total**
Boston	—	3–3	6–0	5–0–1	6–0	**20–3–1**
Chicago	3–3	—	2–3–1	1–3–2	6–0	**12–9–3**
Detroit	0–6	3–2–1	—	2–1–3	4–2	**9–11–4**
N.Y. Rangers	0–5–1	3–1–2	1–2–3	—	6–0	**10–8–6**
Pittsburgh	0–6	0–6	2–4	0–6	—	**2–22–0**

==== Vs. Canadian Division ====
1929–30 NHL records
Team	**MTL**	**MTM**	**NYA**	**OTT**	**TOR**	**Total**
Boston	4–0	3–1	3–1	4–0	4–0	**18–2–0**
Chicago	0–3–1	4–0	2–2	2–2	1–2–1	**9–9–2**
Detroit	1–3	1–2–1	1–3	0–3–1	2–2	**5–13–2**
N.Y. Rangers	1–2–1	2–2	2–2	2–0–2	0–3–1	**7–9–4**
Pittsburgh	0–2–2	0–4	1–2–1	1–3	1–3	**3–14–3**

== Schedule and results ==
1929–30 regular season
November: 4–2–1 (home: 3–1–0; road: 1–1–1)

Game	November	Opponent	Score	Record
1	14	@ Montreal Maroons	2–1	1–0–0
2	17	Detroit Cougars	5 – 5 OT	1–0–1
3	19	@ Boston Bruins	3–2	1–1–1
4	21	Montreal Maroons	2–1	2–1–1
5	23	@ Pittsburgh Pirates	5–3	3–1–1
6	26	Toronto Maple Leafs	4–3	3–2–1
7	28	@ Chicago Black Hawks	3–2	4–2–1

December: 5–4–1 (home: 4–1–1; road: 1–3–0)

Game	December	Opponent	Score	Record
8	1	@ Detroit Cougars	4–3	4–3–1
9	8	Pittsburgh Pirates	5–1	5–3–1
10	12	Montreal Canadiens	8–3	6–3–1
11	14	@ Toronto Maple Leafs	7 – 6 OT	6–4–1
12	17	New York Americans	6–2	7–4–1
13	19	@ Montreal Canadiens	7–2	7–5–1
14	22	Chicago Black Hawks	3–1	8–5–1
15	26	Boston Bruins	4–2	8–6–1
16	28	@ Ottawa Senators	3–1	9–6–1
17	31	Ottawa Senators	1 – 1 OT	9–6–2

January: 6–5–0 (home: 5–1–0; road: 1–4–0)

Game	January	Opponent	Score	Record
18	2	@ New York Americans	7–1	9–7–2
19	5	Pittsburgh Pirates	8–3	10–7–2
20	7	@ Boston Bruins	3–0	10–8–2
21	9	Montreal Maroons	5–4	10–9–2
22	12	@ Chicago Black Hawks	2–1	10–10–2
23	14	Detroit Cougars	3–0	11–10–2
24	18	@ Pittsburgh Pirates	6–5	12–10–2
25	19	Chicago Black Hawks	4–1	13–10–2
26	23	Ottawa Senators	6–3	14–10–2
27	26	@ Detroit Cougars	7–3	14–11–2
28	28	New York Americans	4 – 3 OT	15–11–2

February: 1–4–4 (home: 1–2–3; road: 0–2–1)

Game	February	Opponent	Score	Record
29	2	Boston Bruins	3 – 3 OT	15–11–3
30	4	@ New York Americans	5–3	15–12–3
31	6	Detroit Cougars	1 – 1 OT	15–12–4
32	8	@ Ottawa Senators	2 – 2 OT	15–12–5
33	11	@ Montreal Maroons	5–2	15–13–5
34	13	Pittsburgh Pirates	4–1	16–13–5
35	18	Toronto Maple Leafs	5–1	16–14–5
36	23	Boston Bruins	3–2	16–15–5
37	27	Chicago Black Hawks	1 – 1 OT	16–15–6

March: 1–2–4 (home: 0–0–1; road: 1–2–3)

Game	March	Opponent	Score	Record
38	1	@ Toronto Maple Leafs	3 – 3 OT	16–15–7
39	2	@ Detroit Cougars	2 – 2 OT	16–15–8
40	4	@ Chicago Black Hawks	2 – 2 OT	16–15–9
41	8	@ Montreal Canadiens	6–0	16–16–9
42	11	Montreal Canadiens	3 – 3 OT	16–16–10
43	15	@ Pittsburgh Pirates	4 – 3 OT	17–16–10
44	18	@ Boston Bruins	9–2	17–17–10

Legend: Win (2 points) Loss (0 points) Tie (1 point)

== Playoffs ==
1930 Stanley Cup playoffs
Quarterfinals vs. (C3) Ottawa Senators – Rangers win 6 goals to 3 goals

Game	Date	Visitor	Score	Home	OT	Series
1	March 20	New York Rangers	1–1	Ottawa Senators	OT	Series tied 1 goal to 1 goal
2	March 23	Ottawa Senators	2–5	New York Rangers		New York Rangers win series 6 goals to 3 goals

Semifinals vs. (C2) Montreal Canadiens – Canadiens win 2–0

Game	Date	Visitor	Score	Home	OT	Series
1	March 28	New York Rangers	1–2	Montreal Canadiens	OT	Montreal leads series 1–0
2	March 30	Montreal Canadiens	2–0	New York Rangers	OT	Montreal wins series 2–0

Legend: Win Loss Tie

== Player statistics ==
Skaters

Regular Season
Player	GP	G	A	Pts	PIM
Frank Boucher	42	26	36	62	16
Bill Cook	44	29	30	59	56
Frederick Cook	43	24	18	42	55
Melville Keeling	44	19	7	26	34
Murray Murdoch	44	13	13	26	22
Paul Thompson	44	7	12	19	36
Leo Bourgeault	44	7	6	13	54
Ivan Johnson	30	3	3	6	82
Leroy Goldsworthy	44	4	1	5	16
Leo Quenneville	25	0	3	3	10
Ralph Taylor^{†}	24	2	0	2	28
Melville Vail	32	1	1	2	2
Orville Heximer	19	1	0	1	4
Leo Reise^{†}	14	0	1	1	8
Bill Regan	10	0	0	0	4
Harry Foster	31	0	0	0	10

Playoffs
Player	GP	G	A	Pts	PIM
Murray Murdoch	4	3	0	3	6
Melville Keeling	4	0	3	3	8
Leo Bourgeault	4	1	1	2	6
Frederick Cook	4	2	0	2	2
Frank Boucher	3	1	1	2	0
Bill Cook	4	0	1	1	11
Bill Regan	4	0	0	0	0
Leo Reise	4	0	0	0	16
Melville Vail	4	0	0	0	0
Ralph Taylor	4	0	0	0	10
Leo Quenneville	4	0	0	0	0
Leroy Goldsworthy	4	0	0	0	2
Ivan Johnson	4	0	0	0	14
Paul Thompson	4	0	0	0	2

Goaltenders

Regular Season
Player	GP	TOI	W	L	T	GA	GAA	SO
John Ross Roach	44	2770	17	17	10	143	3.10	1

Goaltenders

Playoffs
Player	GP	TOI	W	L	T	GA	GAA	SO
John Ross Roach	4	309	1	2	1	7	1.36	0

^{†}Denotes player spent time with another team before joining Rangers. Stats reflect time with Rangers only.
^{‡}Traded mid-season. Stats reflect time with Rangers only.

Note:

Pos = Position;GP = Games played; G = Goals; A = Assists; Pts = Points; PIM = Penalty minutes; +/- = Plus/minus; PPG = Power-play goals; SHG = Short-handed goals; GWG = Game-winning goals
Pos = Position;GP = Games played; Min, TOI = Minutes played; W = Wins; L = Losses; T,T/OT = Ties; OTL = Overtime losses; GA = Goals-against; GAA = Goals-against average; SO = Shutouts; SA = Shots against; SV = Shots saved;SV% = Save percentage;

== See also ==
- 1929–30 NHL season
