= Hub Wilson =

Canadian ice hockey player

- Born: May 13, 1909; Ottawa, Ontario, Canada
- Died: July 15, 1999 (aged 90); Ontario, Canada
- Height: 5 ft 10 in (178 cm)
- Weight: 180 lb (82 kg; 12 st 12 lb)
- Position: Centre
- Shot: Left
- Played for: New York Americans
- Playing career: 1930–1942

James Hubert Wilson (May 13, 1909 — July 15, 1999) was a Canadian professional ice hockey centre who played two games in the National Hockey League with the New York Americans during the 1931–32 season. The rest of his career, which lasted from 1930 to 1942, was spent in various minor leagues. Wilson was born in Ottawa, Ontario, in 1909 and died there in 1999.

== Career statistics ==
=== Regular season and playoffs ===
| | | | Regular season | | | | | Playoffs |
| Season | Team | League | GP | G | A | Pts | PIM | GP | G | A | Pts | PIM |
|---|---|---|---|---|---|---|---|---|---|---|---|---|
| 1930–31 | Montreal AAA | MCHL | 11 | 3 | 1 | 4 | 10 | 2 | 2 | 0 | 2 | 2 |
| 1931–32 | New York Americans | NHL | 2 | 0 | 0 | 0 | 0 | — | — | — | — | — |
| 1931–32 | New Haven Eagles | Can-Am | 37 | 6 | 2 | 8 | 20 | 2 | 0 | 0 | 0 | 0 |
| 1932–33 | New Haven Eagles | Can-Am | 43 | 13 | 12 | 25 | 44 | 5 | 0 | 0 | 0 | 0 |
| 1933–34 | Quebec Castors | Can-Am | 40 | 13 | 10 | 23 | 15 | — | — | — | — | — |
| 1934–35 | Quebec Castors | Can-Am | 47 | 13 | 16 | 29 | 23 | 3 | 0 | 0 | 0 | 0 |
| 1935–36 | Springfield Indians | Can-Am | 38 | 17 | 17 | 34 | 30 | 3 | 1 | 1 | 2 | 0 |
| 1936–37 | Springfield Indians | IAHL | 49 | 10 | 11 | 21 | 23 | 5 | 1 | 0 | 1 | 2 |
| 1937–38 | Springfield Indians | IAHL | 42 | 12 | 8 | 20 | 24 | — | — | — | — | — |
| 1938–39 | Springfield Indians | IAHL | 25 | 2 | 3 | 5 | 6 | — | — | — | — | — |
| 1938–39 | Providence Reds | IAHL | 28 | 8 | 13 | 21 | 10 | — | — | — | — | — |
| 1939–40 | Providence Reds | IAHL | 53 | 15 | 14 | 29 | 20 | 8 | 3 | 3 | 6 | 8 |
| 1940–41 | Providence Reds | AHL | 45 | 14 | 10 | 24 | 14 | 4 | 2 | 0 | 2 | 2 |
| 1941–42 | Philadelphia Rockets | AHL | 1 | 0 | 0 | 0 | 0 | — | — | — | — | — |
| 1941–42 | Pittsburgh Hornets | AHL | 48 | 7 | 10 | 17 | 2 | — | — | — | — | — |
| Can-Am totals | | | 205 | 62 | 57 | 119 | 132 | 13 | 1 | 1 | 2 | 0 |
| IAHL/AHL totals | | | 291 | 68 | 69 | 137 | 99 | 17 | 6 | 3 | 9 | 12 |
| NHL totals | | | 2 | 0 | 0 | 0 | 0 | — | — | — | — | — |
