= John Doran (ice hockey) =

Canadian ice hockey player (1910–1975)

- Doran in 1936
- Born: May 20, 1910; Belleville, Ontario, Canada
- Died: February 11, 1975 (aged 64)
- Position: Defence
- Shot: Left
- Played for: Montreal Canadiens; Detroit Red Wings; New York Americans
- Playing career: 1931–1943

John Michael Doran (May 20, 1910 — February 11, 1975) was a Canadian professional ice hockey player who played 98 games in the National Hockey League with the Detroit Red Wings, New York Americans, and Montreal Canadiens between 1933 and 1940. The rest of his career, which lasted from 1931 to 1943, was spent in various minor leagues. He was born in Belleville, Ontario.

== Career statistics ==
=== Regular season and playoffs ===
			Regular season					Playoffs
Season	Team	League	GP	G	A	Pts	PIM	GP	G	A	Pts	PIM
1928–29	West Toronto Redmen	OHA	—	—	—	—	—	—	—	—	—	—
1929–30	West Toronto Nationals	OHA	4	2	0	2	2	—	—	—	—	—
1929–30	Toronto Stockyards	TMHL	2	1	0	1	2	—	—	—	—	—
1929–30	West Toronto Nationals	M-Cup	—	—	—	—	—	7	2	1	3	14
1930–31	West Toronto Nationals	OHA	—	—	—	—	—	—	—	—	—	—
1931–32	Toronto Marlboros	OHA Sr	7	0	0	0	8	—	—	—	—	—
1931–32	Toronto Eaton's	TMHL	9	3	1	4	8	4	0	1	1	2
1952–53	New Haven Eagles	Can-Am	41	4	2	6	38	—	—	—	—	—
1933–34	New York Americans	NHL	39	1	4	5	40	—	—	—	—	—
1933–34	Quebec Castors	Can-Am	8	1	0	1	20	—	—	—	—	—
1934–35	Quebec Castors	Can-Am	44	7	11	18	105	3	1	0	1	4
1935–36	New York Americans	NHL	25	4	2	6	44	3	0	0	0	0
1935–36	New Haven Eagles	Can-Am	24	0	0	0	87	—	—	—	—	—
1936–37	New York Americans	NHL	21	0	1	1	10	—	—	—	—	—
1936–37	New Haven Eagles	IAHL	6	1	2	3	16	—	—	—	—	—
1936–37	Pittsburgh Hornets	IAHL	21	2	8	10	34	5	1	1	2	11
1937–38	Detroit Red Wings	NHL	7	0	0	0	10	—	—	—	—	—
1937–38	Pittsburgh Hornets	IAHL	25	4	6	10	24	—	—	—	—	—
1937–38	New Haven Eagles	IAHL	11	0	6	6	14	2	0	0	0	2
1938–39	New Haven Eagles	IAHL	7	0	0	0	24	—	—	—	—	—
1938–39	Providence Reds	IAHL	33	2	10	12	63	5	1	1	2	8
1939–40	Providence Reds	IAHL	46	14	19	33	82	8	4	2	6	16
1939–40	Montreal Canadiens	NHL	6	0	3	3	6	—	—	—	—	—
1940–41	Hershey Bears	AHL	16	0	5	5	20	—	—	—	—	—
1940–41	Buffalo Bisons	AHL	42	2	16	18	76	—	—	—	—	—
1941–42	Truro Bearcats	NSAPC	1	0	0	0	0	5	2	1	3	0
1941–42	Truro Bearcats	Al-Cup	—	—	—	—	—	8	1	5	6	4
1942–43	Montreal Army	MCHL	4	1	5	6	4	5	5	7	12	12
IAHL/AHL totals			207	25	72	97	353	20	6	4	10	37
NHL totals			98	5	10	15	110	3	0	0	0	0
