= Peanuts O'Flaherty =

Canadian ice hockey player

- Born: April 10, 1918 Toronto, Ontario, Canada
- Died: July 16, 2008 (aged 90) Mississauga, Ontario, Canada
- Height: 5 ft 7 in (170 cm)
- Weight: 154 lb (70 kg; 11 st 0 lb)
- Position: Left wing
- Shot: Right
- Played for: NHL; New York Americans; Brooklyn Americans; AHL; Pittsburgh Hornets; Springfield Indians; OHASr; Toronto St. Michael's Majors
- Playing career: 1940–1956

John Benedict "Peanuts" O'Flaherty (April 10, 1918 — July 16, 2008) was a Canadian professional ice hockey player who played 21 games in the National Hockey League with the New York Americans and Brooklyn Americans. He was born in Toronto, Ontario.

== Playing career ==
Peanuts received his nickname when a Toronto sports writer spotted him selling peanuts at Maple Leaf Gardens in 1933. In 21 career NHL games O'Flaherty recorded 5 goals and an assist for 6 points. He played several seasons in the American Hockey League with the Pittsburgh Hornets in the 1940s. His son, Gerry O'Flaherty, would go on to play in the NHL from 1971 to 1979.

== Career statistics ==
=== Regular season and playoffs ===
			Regular season					Playoffs
Season	Team	League	GP	G	A	Pts	PIM	GP	G	A	Pts	PIM
1933–34	St. Michael's Buzzers	ON Jr. B	—	—	—	—	—	—	—	—	—	—
1933–34	St. Michael's Majors	M-Cup	—	—	—	—	—	13	11	8	19	12
1934–35	St. Michael's Majors	OHA Jr	12	10	6	16	10	3	1	0	1	0
1935–36	West Toronto Nationals	OHA Jr	10	6	14	20	4	5	4	4	8	9
1935–36	West Toronto Nationals	M-Cup	—	—	—	—	—	12	10	9	19	10
1936–37	Toronto Dominions	OHA Sr	9	7	5	12	4	8	2	4	6	4
1936–37	Toronto Dominions	Al-Cup	—	—	—	—	—	3	2	0	2	2
1937–38	Toronto Marlboros	OHA Jr	12	20	10	30	16	6	5	4	9	6
1937–38	Toronto Goodyears	OHA Sr	—	—	—	—	—	2	2	1	3	0
1937–38	Toronto Goodyears	Al-Cup	—	—	—	—	—	4	0	0	0	0
1938–39	Toronto Goodyears	OHA Sr	20	23	12	35	12	5	6	4	10	0
1938–39	Toronto Goodyears	Al-Cup	—	—	—	—	—	10	7	5	12	6
1939–40	Toronto Goodyears	OHA Sr	29	41	35	76	18	7	8	5	13	6
1939–40	Toronto Goodyears	Al-Cup	—	—	—	—	—	4	3	3	6	2
1940–41	New York Americans	NHL	10	4	0	4	0	—	—	—	—	—
1940–41	Springfield Indians	AHL	11	2	8	10	0	—	—	—	—	—
1940–41	Pittsburgh Hornets	AHL	24	10	12	22	4	6	1	2	3	2
1941–42	Brooklyn Americans	NHL	11	1	1	2	0	—	—	—	—	—
1941–42	Springfield Indians	AHL	42	18	44	62	14	5	5	1	6	0
1942–43	Pittsburgh Hornets	AHL	36	10	27	37	6	2	1	0	1	0
1943–44	Pittsburgh Hornets	AHL	2	1	2	3	0	—	—	—	—	—
1943–44	Toronto RCAF	OHA Sr	8	7	7	14	2	—	—	—	—	—
1943–44	Toronto People's Credit	TIHL	20	9	15	24	10	6	7	7	14	4
1945–46	Pittsburgh Hornets	AHL	61	24	45	69	24	6	4	3	7	2
1946–47	Pittsburgh Hornets	AHL	64	33	35	68	24	12	0	5	5	4
1947–48	Pittsburgh Hornets	AHL	50	16	20	36	12	—	—	—	—	—
1948–49	Pittsburgh Hornets	AHL	67	24	25	49	22	—	—	—	—	—
1949–50	Pittsburgh Hornets	AHL	69	10	15	25	2	—	—	—	—	—
1950–51	St. Michael's Monarchs	OHA Sr	28	7	12	19	40	9	1	2	3	8
1951–52	Saint John Beavers	MMHL	45	5	9	14	50	7	1	3	4	2
1952–53	Ottawa Senators	QHL	8	0	0	0	10	—	—	—	—	—
1953–54	Sault Ste. Marie Greyhounds	NOHA	4	0	0	0	2	—	—	—	—	—
1954–55	Sault Ste. Marie Greyhounds	NOHA	3	0	0	0	0	—	—	—	—	—
1955–56	Sudbury Wolves	NOHA	8	0	1	1	4	—	—	—	—	—
1957–58	Sudbury Wolves	NOHA	—	—	—	—	—	—	—	—	—	—
1958–59	Sudbury Wolves	NOHA	1	0	0	0	0	—	—	—	—	—
AHL totals			426	148	233	381	108	31	11	11	22	8
NHL totals			21	5	1	6	0	—	—	—	—	—
