= Gene Chouinard =

Canadian ice hockey player

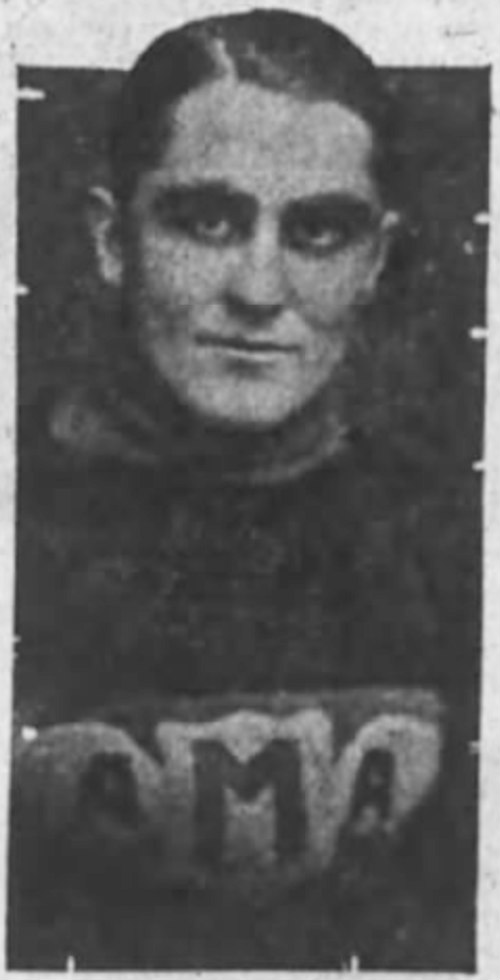
- Chouinard with Ottawa Montagnards
- Born: January 5, 1902; Ottawa, Ontario, Canada
- Died: January 29, 1957 (aged 55); Montreal, Quebec, Canada
- Height: 5 ft 6 in (168 cm)
- Weight: 160 lb (73 kg; 11 st 6 lb)
- Position: Defence
- Shot: Left
- Played for: Ottawa Senators
- Playing career: 1921–1938

Vincent Philippe Eugene "Blackie" Chouinard (January 5, 1902 – January 29, 1957) was a Canadian professional ice hockey player who played eight games in the National Hockey League with the Ottawa Senators during the 1927–28 season. The rest of his career, which lasted from 1921 to 1938, was spent in various minor leagues.

== Playing career ==
Chouinard played in the Ottawa City Hockey League (OCHL) from 1921–25 in his hometown with the Ottawa Montagnards. He then played the 1925–26 season in the Central Hockey League with the Eveleth-Hibbing Rangers and the following season in Niagara Falls, Ontario. During the 1927–28 Chouinard played for the Quebec Castors, the Waterville, Maine, and he also joined the Ottawa Senators for eight games during the 1927–28. Chouinard played failed to score a point in eight NHL games, but he did go on to play eight more years of professional hockey with New Haven Eagles (1928–31 and 1933–34), Bronx Tigers (1931–32), Riviere-du-Loup Lancers and Quebec Castors (1932–33), Tulsa Oilers and London Tecumsehs (1934–36), and Perth Crescents (1937–38).

== Coaching career ==
He first retired as a player in 1936 to become the coach of the Perth Blue Wings in the OVHL for one year. He played final games with the Perth Crescents during the 1937–38 season before retiring for good.

== Career statistics ==
=== Regular season and playoffs ===
			Regular season					Playoffs
Season	Team	League	GP	G	A	Pts	PIM	GP	G	A	Pts	PIM
1921–22	Ottawa Montagnards	OCHL	14	7	9	16	14	7	2	4	6	3
1922–23	Ottawa Montagnards	OCHL	9	8	3	11	14	2	0	0	0	0
1923–24	Ottawa Montagnards	OCHL	10	2	1	3	—	2	0	0	0	0
1923–24	Ottawa Montagnards	Al-Cup	—	—	—	—	—	4	4	0	4	—
1924–25	Ottawa Montagnards	OCHL	16	12	1	13	—	3	1	0	1	4
1924–25	Ottawa Montagnards	Al-Cup	—	—	—	—	—	4	0	0	1	14
1925–26	Eveleth-Hibbing Rangers	CHL	19	0	0	0	0	—	—	—	—	—
1926–27	Niagara Falls Cataracts	Can-Pro	27	3	3	6	16	1	0	0	0	0
1927–28	Ottawa Senators	NHL	8	0	0	0	0	—	—	—	—	—
1927–28	Quebec Castors	Can-Am	2	0	0	0	0	—	—	—	—	—
1928–29	New Haven Eagles	Can-Am	22	4	1	5	8	2	0	0	0	4
1929–30	New Haven Eagles	Can-Am	40	4	7	11	60	—	—	—	—	—
1930–31	New Haven Eagles	Can-Am	40	7	11	18	56	—	—	—	—	—
1931–32	Bronx Tigers	Can-Am	39	5	7	12	40	2	1	1	2	4
1932–33	Quebec Castors	Can-Am	20	3	5	8	16	—	—	—	—	—
1933–34	New Haven Eagles	Can-Am	40	8	12	20	25	—	—	—	—	—
1934–35	Tulsa Oilers	AHA	48	11	13	24	11	5	1	0	1	8
1934–35	London Tecumsehs	IHL	1	0	0	0	0	—	—	—	—	—
1935–36	Tulsa Oilers	AHA	36	1	7	8	10	3	0	0	0	5
1936–37	Perth Blue Wings	OVHL	—	—	—	—	—	—	—	—	—	—
1937–38	Perth Blue Wings	OVHL	1	0	0	0	0	—	—	—	—	—
Can-Am totals			203	31	43	74	205	4	1	1	2	8
NHL totals			8	0	0	0	0	—	—	—	—	—
