= Frank Beisler =

American ice hockey player

- Born: October 18, 1911; New Haven, Connecticut, United States
- Died: September 8, 1973 (aged 61); New Haven Connecticut, United States
- Height: 6 ft 2 in (188 cm)
- Weight: 190 lb (86 kg; 13 st 8 lb)
- Position: Defence
- Shot: Left
- Played for: New York Americans
- Playing career: 1931–1946

Frank Michael Beisler (October 18, 1911 — September 8, 1973) was an American ice hockey defenseman. He played two games in the National Hockey League for the New York Americans between 1937 and 1940. The rest of his career, which lasted from 1931 to 1946, was spent in the minor leagues.

After his playing career he spent several years as a coach in the American Hockey League, winning a Calder Cup championship with the Buffalo Bisons in 1946.

Beisler was born in New Haven, Connecticut.

== Career statistics ==
=== Regular season and playoffs ===
			Regular season					Playoffs
Season	Team	League	GP	G	A	Pts	PIM	GP	G	A	Pts	PIM
1930–31	New Haven Collegiate	HS-CT	—	—	—	—	—	—	—	—	—	—
1931–32	Bronx Tigers	Exhib	—	—	—	—	—	—	—	—	—	—
1932–33	Bronx Tigers	Exhib	—	—	—	—	—	—	—	—	—	—
1933–34	Hershey Chocolate Bars	EAHL	25	3	1	4	23	6	1	0	1	8
1934–35	New Haven Eagles	Can-Am	41	3	1	4	32	—	—	—	—	—
1935–36	New Haven Eagles	Can-Am	46	4	5	9	38	—	—	—	—	—
1936–37	New York Americans	NHL	1	0	0	0	0	—	—	—	—	—
1936–37	New Haven Eagles	IAHL	44	3	2	5	50	—	—	—	—	—
1937–38	New Haven Eagles	IAHL	26	0	2	2	21	2	0	0	0	0
1938–39	Springfield Indians	IAHL	53	1	1	2	75	3	0	1	1	2
1939–40	New York Americans	NHL	1	0	0	0	0	—	—	—	—	—
1939–40	Springfield Indians	IAHL	50	3	8	11	37	3	0	2	2	2
1940–41	Springfield Indians	AHL	56	1	10	11	46	3	0	0	0	0
1941–42	Springfield Indians	AHL	42	2	6	8	35	5	0	0	0	0
1942–43	Buffalo Bisons	AHL	55	2	7	9	27	9	1	0	1	4
1943–44	Buffalo Bisons	AHL	25	3	4	7	15	—	—	—	—	—
1945–46	Buffalo Bisons	AHL	4	0	1	1	0	—	—	—	—	—
IAHL/AHL totals			355	15	41	56	306	25	1	3	4	8
NHL totals			2	0	0	0	0	—	—	—	—	—
