= George Massecar =

Canadian ice hockey player

- Born: July 10, 1904; Waterloo, Ontario, Canada
- Died: July 14, 1957 (aged 53)
- Height: 5 ft 9 in (175 cm)
- Weight: 165 lb (75 kg; 11 st 11 lb)
- Position: Left wing
- Shot: Left
- Played for: New York Americans
- Playing career: 1925–1937

George Sheldon Massecar (July 10, 1904 — July 14, 1957) was a Canadian ice hockey player who played professionally from 1925 to 1937. He played 100 games in the NHL for the New York Americans between 1929 and 1932, spending the remainder of his career in various minor leagues.

== Career statistics ==
=== Regular season and playoffs ===
| | | | Regular season | | | | | Playoffs |
| Season | Team | League | GP | G | A | Pts | PIM | GP | G | A | Pts | PIM |
|---|---|---|---|---|---|---|---|---|---|---|---|---|
| 1925–26 | Niagara Falls Cataracts | OHA Sr | 19 | 4 | 3 | 7 | 10 | — | — | — | — | — |
| 1926–27 | Niagara Falls Cataracts | Can-Pro | 24 | 9 | 3 | 12 | 16 | — | — | — | — | — |
| 1927–28 | Niagara Falls Cataracts | Can-Pro | 40 | 6 | 3 | 9 | 25 | — | — | — | — | — |
| 1928–29 | New Haven Eagles | Can-Am | 40 | 8 | 1 | 9 | 39 | 2 | 0 | 0 | 0 | 4 |
| 1929–30 | New York Americans | NHL | 43 | 7 | 3 | 10 | 18 | — | — | — | — | — |
| 1930–31 | New York Americans | NHL | 43 | 4 | 7 | 11 | 16 | — | — | — | — | — |
| 1931–32 | New York Americans | NHL | 14 | 1 | 1 | 2 | 12 | — | — | — | — | — |
| 1931–32 | Bronx Tigers | Can-Am | 21 | 5 | 2 | 7 | 16 | 2 | 0 | 0 | 0 | 4 |
| 1932–33 | St. Louis Flyers | AHA | 45 | 14 | 21 | 35 | 14 | 4 | 4 | 0 | 4 | 8 |
| 1933–34 | Detroit Olympics | IHL | 44 | 10 | 12 | 22 | 13 | 6 | 1 | 1 | 2 | 0 |
| 1934–35 | Buffalo Bisons | IHL | 43 | 9 | 7 | 16 | 4 | — | — | — | — | — |
| 1935–36 | Buffalo Bisons | IHL | 48 | 10 | 11 | 21 | 12 | 5 | 1 | 0 | 1 | 0 |
| 1936–37 | Buffalo Bisons | IAHL | 11 | 1 | 0 | 1 | 0 | — | — | — | — | — |
| NHL totals | | | 100 | 12 | 11 | 23 | 46 | — | — | — | — |
