= Eddie Burke =

Canadian ice hockey player (1905–1993)

- Born: June 2, 1905 Toronto, Ontario, Canada
- Died: October 7, 1993 (aged 88)
- Height: 5 ft 8 in (173 cm)
- Weight: 174 lb (79 kg; 12 st 6 lb)
- Position: Right wing
- Shot: Right
- Played for: New York Americans; Boston Bruins
- Playing career: 1925–1937

Edmund Cornelius George Burke (June 2, 1905 – October 7, 1993) was a Canadian professional ice hockey player who played 106 games in the National Hockey League. He was born in Toronto, Ontario and played for the Boston Bruins and New York Americans. Burke also coached the Boston Tigers of the Canadian-American Hockey League (CAHL). After his career in hockey, he disappeared and his whereabouts remain unknown, although some sources indicate that he died in 1969.

== Career statistics ==
=== Regular season and playoffs ===
| | | | Regular season | | | | | Playoffs |
| Season | Team | League | GP | G | A | Pts | PIM | GP | G | A | Pts | PIM |
|---|---|---|---|---|---|---|---|---|---|---|---|---|
| 1921–22 | Toronto St. Mary's | OHA | — | — | — | — | — | — | — | — | — | — |
| 1922–23 | Toronto St. Mary's | OHA | 6 | 5 | 3 | 8 | — | 7 | 7 | 1 | 8 | — |
| 1923–24 | Toronto St. Mary's | OHA | 8 | 7 | 4 | 11 | 21 | — | — | — | — | — |
| 1924–25 | Sault Ste. Marie Greyhounds | NOHA | — | — | — | — | — | — | — | — | — | — |
| 1925–26 | Sault Ste. Marie Greyhounds | CHL | 26 | 1 | 0 | 1 | 16 | — | — | — | — | — |
| 1926–27 | Toronto Marlboros | OHA | — | — | — | — | — | — | — | — | — | — |
| 1927–28 | Boston Tigers | Can-Am | 39 | 12 | 1 | 13 | 54 | 2 | 1 | 0 | 1 | 4 |
| 1928–29 | Boston Tigers | Can-Am | 34 | 3 | 3 | 6 | 55 | 4 | 1 | 0 | 1 | 4 |
| 1929–30 | Boston Tigers | Can-Am | 40 | 14 | 9 | 23 | 60 | 5 | 0 | 0 | 0 | 4 |
| 1930–31 | Boston Tigers | Can-Am | 40 | 20 | 18 | 38 | 60 | 9 | 4 | 3 | 7 | 12 |
| 1931–32 | Boston Bruins | NHL | 16 | 3 | 0 | 3 | 12 | — | — | — | — | — |
| 1931–32 | Boston Cubs | Can-Am | 28 | 9 | 5 | 14 | 47 | 5 | 2 | 1 | 3 | 5 |
| 1932–33 | New York Americans | NHL | 15 | 2 | 0 | 2 | 4 | — | — | — | — | — |
| 1932–33 | Philadelphia Arrows | Can-Am | 21 | 9 | 11 | 20 | 28 | — | — | — | — | — |
| 1933–34 | New York Americans | NHL | 46 | 20 | 10 | 30 | 24 | — | — | — | — | — |
| 1934–35 | New York Americans | NHL | 29 | 4 | 10 | 14 | 15 | — | — | — | — | — |
| 1935–36 | Syracuse Stars | IHL | 47 | 11 | 32 | 43 | 18 | 3 | 1 | 1 | 2 | 2 |
| 1936–37 | Buffalo Bisons | IAHL | 1 | 0 | 0 | 0 | 2 | — | — | — | — | — |
| 1936–37 | Syracuse Stars | IAHL | 21 | 0 | 7 | 7 | 9 | — | — | — | — | — |
| Can-Am totals | | | 202 | 67 | 47 | 111 | 304 | 25 | 8 | 4 | 12 | 29 |
| NHL totals | | | 106 | 29 | 20 | 49 | 55 | — | — | — | — | — |
