= Bill Jennings (ice hockey) =

Canadian ice hockey player

- Born: June 28, 1916; Toronto, Ontario, Canada
- Died: November 29, 1999 (aged 83); New Carlisle, Ohio, USA
- Height: 5 ft 10 in (178 cm)
- Weight: 165 lb (75 kg; 11 st 11 lb)
- Position: Right wing
- Shot: Right
- Played for: Detroit Red Wings; Boston Bruins
- Playing career: 1938–1946

Joseph William Jennings (June 28, 1916 – November 29, 1999) was a Canadian professional ice hockey player who played 108 games in the National Hockey League between 1941 and 1945. He played for the Detroit Red Wings and Boston Bruins. He was born in Toronto, Ontario.

== Career statistics ==
=== Regular season and playoffs ===
			Regular season					Playoffs
Season	Team	League	GP	G	A	Pts	PIM	GP	G	A	Pts	PIM
1933–34	West Toronto Nationals	OHA	12	2	2	4	12	—	—	—	—	—
1934–35	West Toronto Nationals	OHA	12	6	0	6	22	—	—	—	—	—
1935–36	Toronto Dominion	TIHL	9	5	2	7	18	—	—	—	—	—
1935–36	West Toronto Nationals	OHA	8	7	4	11	0	5	1	3	4	17
1935–36	West Toronto Nationals	M-Cup	—	—	—	—	—	12	9	5	14	19
1936–37	Toronto Dominion	TIHL	8	3	5	8	10	8	2	1	3	15
1936–37	Toronto Dominion	Al-Cup	—	—	—	—	—	3	1	0	1	4
1937–38	Toronto Goodyears	TIHL	14	9	8	17	16	4	0	0	0	2
1937–38	Toronto Dominion	Al-Cup	—	—	—	—	—	4	0	0	0	4
1938–39	Earls Court Rangers	ENG	—	18	12	30	—	—	—	—	—	—
1939–40	Detroit Holzbaugh	MOHL	35	24	20	44	38	11	6	1	7	29
1940–41	Detroit Red Wings	NHL	12	1	5	6	2	9	2	2	4	0
1940–41	Indianapolis Capitals	AHL	16	2	1	3	6	—	—	—	—	—
1941–42	Detroit Red Wings	NHL	16	2	1	3	6	—	—	—	—	—
1941–42	Indianapolis Capitals	AHL	34	9	25	34	10	10	4	2	6	4
1942–43	Detroit Red Wings	NHL	8	3	3	6	2	—	—	—	—	—
1942–43	Indianapolis Capitals	AHL	49	23	33	56	5	7	2	5	7	2
1943–44	Detroit Red Wings	NHL	33	6	11	17	10	4	0	0	0	0
1944–45	Boston Bruins	NHL	39	20	13	33	25	7	2	2	4	6
1944–45	Indianapolis Capitals	AHL	3	1	1	2	0	—	—	—	—	—
1945–46	Hershey Bears	AHL	37	17	14	31	12	—	—	—	—	—
1945–46	St. Louis Flyers	AHL	17	7	8	15	2	—	—	—	—	—
AHL totals			180	73	98	171	49	17	6	7	13	6
NHL totals			108	32	33	65	45	20	4	4	8	6
