= Leonard Grosvenor =

Canadian ice hockey player (1905–1981)

- Len Grosvenor
- Born: July 21, 1905; Ottawa, Ontario, Canada
- Died: March 15, 1981 (aged 75); Ottawa, Ontario, Canada
- Height: 5 ft 9 in (175 cm)
- Weight: 172 lb (78 kg; 12 st 4 lb)
- Position: Centre
- Shot: Right
- Played for: Ottawa Senators; New York Americans; Montreal Canadiens
- Playing career: 1925–1933

Leonard Cecil Grosvenor (July 21, 1905 – March 15, 1981) was a Canadian professional ice hockey player who played 150 games in the National Hockey League with the Ottawa Senators, New York Americans, and Montreal Canadiens between 1927 and 1933.

== Career statistics ==
=== Regular season and playoffs ===
			Regular season					Playoffs
Season	Team	League	GP	G	A	Pts	PIM	GP	G	A	Pts	PIM
1925–26	Ottawa Rideaus	OCHL	—	1	0	1	—	—	—	—	—	—
1926–27	Ottawa Rideaus	OCHL	14	9	4	13	—	—	—	—	—	—
1927–28	Ottawa Senators	NHL	44	1	2	3	18	2	0	0	0	2
1928–29	Ottawa Senators	NHL	42	3	2	5	18	—	—	—	—	—
1929–30	Ottawa Senators	NHL	15	0	3	3	21	—	—	—	—	—
1929–30	London Panthers	IHL	27	6	1	7	24	2	0	0	0	0
1930–31	London Tecumsehs	IHL	9	4	1	5	9	—	—	—	—	—
1930–31	Ottawa Senators	NHL	33	5	4	9	25	—	—	—	—	—
1931–32	New York Americans	NHL	12	0	0	0	0	—	—	—	—	—
1931–32	Bronx Tigers	Can-Am	30	6	5	11	28	2	0	0	0	0
1932–33	Montreal Canadiens	NHL	4	0	0	0	0	2	0	0	0	0
NHL totals			150	9	11	20	82	4	0	0	0	2
