= Hal Picketts =

Canadian ice hockey player

- Hal Picketts with the Rochester Cardinals in 1935
- Born: April 22, 1909; Asquith, Saskatchewan
- Died: April 13, 2002 (aged 92); Saskatoon, Saskatchewan
- Height: 6 ft 0 in (183 cm)
- Weight: 183 lb (83 kg; 13 st 1 lb)
- Position: Right wing
- Shot: Right
- Played for: New York Americans
- Playing career: 1927–1941

Frederick Harold Picketts (April 22, 1909 — April 13, 2002) was a Canadian professional ice hockey player who played 48 games in the National Hockey League with the New York Americans during the 1933–34 season. The rest of his career, which lasted from 1927 to 1941, was spent in various minor leagues. Picketts was born in Asquith, Saskatchewan and died at a nursing home in Saskatoon, Saskatchewan in 2002.

== Career statistics ==
=== Regular season and playoffs ===
			Regular season					Playoffs
Season	Team	League	GP	G	A	Pts	PIM	GP	G	A	Pts	PIM
1927–28	Saskatoon Tigers	S-SSHL	2	0	0	0	0	—	—	—	—	—
1927–28	Saskatoon Hilltops	N-SJHL	1	0	1	1	0	5	1	1	2	13
1928–29	Saskatoon Hilltops	N-SJHL	—	—	—	—	—	—	—	—	—	—
1929–30	Biggar Nationals	N-SSHL	10	4	0	4	8	—	—	—	—	—
1930–31	North Battleford Beavers	N-SSHL	19	7	3	10	18	4	2	1	3	6
1931–32	Bronx Tigers	Can-Am	37	2	0	2	30	2	0	0	0	0
1932–33	New Haven Eagles	Can-Am	46	8	3	11	90	—	—	—	—	—
1933–34	New York Americans	NHL	48	3	1	4	32	—	—	—	—	—
1934–35	Buffalo Bisons	IHL	30	8	2	10	30	—	—	—	—	—
1935–36	Rochester Cardinals	IHL	16	3	1	4	13	—	—	—	—	—
1935–36	London Tecumsehs	IHL	27	1	2	3	19	2	0	0	0	4
1936–37	Spokane Clippers	PCHL	32	7	1	8	53	6	1	0	1	6
1937–38	Spokane Clippers	PCHL	34	3	2	5	42	—	—	—	—	—
1939–40	Saskatoon Quakers	SSHL	8	0	0	0	11	—	—	—	—	—
1939–40	Yorkton Terriers	SSHL	14	4	4	8	21	5	0	0	0	6
1940–41	Yorkton Terriers	SSHL	31	4	9	13	30	9	2	2	4	18
Can-Am totals			83	10	3	13	120	2	0	0	0	0
IHL totals			73	12	5	17	62	2	0	0	0	4
NHL totals			48	3	1	4	32	—	—	—	—	—
