= Leo Quenneville =

Canadian ice hockey player

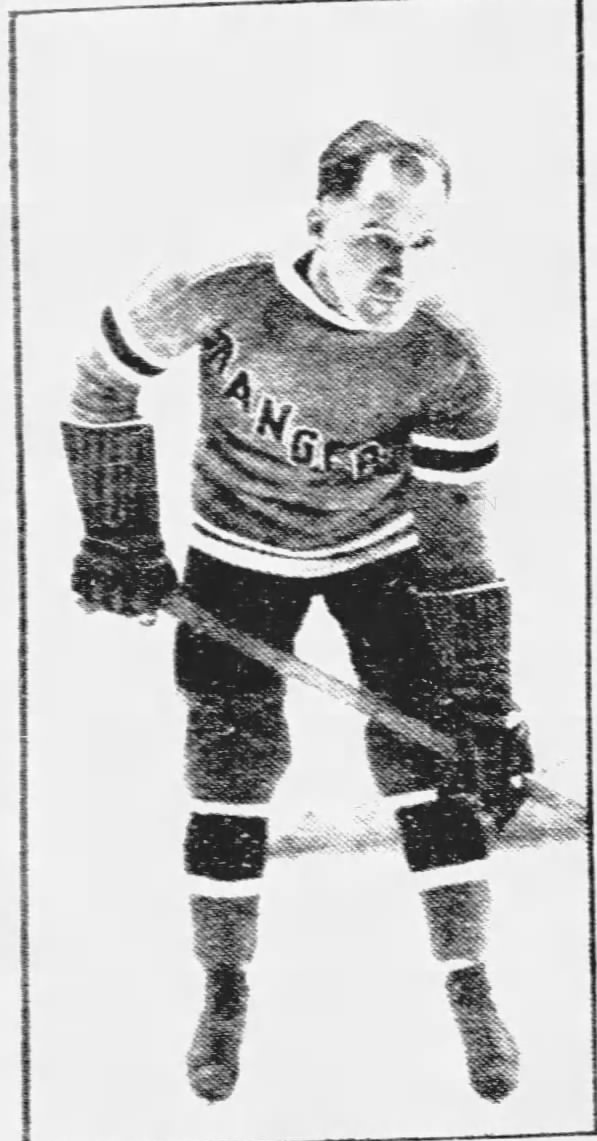
- Quenneville in 1929
- Born: June 15, 1900 Saint-Anicet, Quebec, Canada
- Died: April 9, 1986 (aged 85)
- Height: 5 ft 10 in (178 cm)
- Weight: 170 lb (77 kg; 12 st 2 lb)
- Position: Left wing
- Shot: Left
- Played for: New York Rangers
- Playing career: 1921–1935

Colbert Leo Quenneville (June 15, 1900 – April 9, 1986) was a Canadian ice hockey player. He played 25 games in the National Hockey League with the New York Rangers during the 1929–30 season. The rest of his career, which lasted from 1921 to 1935, was spent in the minor leagues.

== Career statistics ==
=== Regular season and playoffs ===
			Regular season					Playoffs
Season	Team	League	GP	G	A	Pts	PIM	GP	G	A	Pts	PIM
1921–22	Chicoutimi Bleuets	QPHL	9	13	0	13	—	1	0	0	0	—
1922–23	Chicoutimi Bleuets	QPHL	10	6	0	6	—	1	0	0	0	—
1923–24	Trois-Rivières Renards	ECHL	11	5	0	5	—	—	—	—	—	—
1924–25	Trois-Rivières Renards	ECHL	16	14	0	14	—	2	0	0	0	—
1925–26	Chicoutimi Sagueneens	QPHL	—	—	—	—	—	—	—	—	—	—
1926–27	Quebec Castors	Can-Am	31	4	2	6	56	2	0	0	0	4
1927–28	Quebec Castors	Can-Am	40	10	9	19	58	6	2	0	2	18
1928–29	Hamilton Tigers	Can-Pro	7	1	0	1	16	—	—	—	—	—
1928–29	Newark Bulldogs	Can-Am	40	11	6	17	68	—	—	—	—	—
1929–30	New York Rangers	NHL	25	0	3	3	10	3	0	0	0	0
1929–30	Springfield Indians	Can-Am	12	2	1	3	19	—	—	—	—	—
1930–31	London Tecumsehs	IHL	48	14	6	20	50	—	—	—	—	—
1931–32	London Tecumsehs	IHL	45	11	17	28	41	6	0	0	0	4
1932–33	London Tecumsehs	IHL	40	11	8	19	55	6	2	1	3	4
1933–34	Quebec Castors	Can-Am	36	6	17	23	23	—	—	—	—	—
1934–35	Quebec Castors	Can-Am	41	9	12	21	19	3	0	0	0	0
Can-Am totals			200	42	47	89	243	11	2	0	2	22
NHL totals			25	0	3	3	10	—	—	—	—	—
