= Gord Reid =

Canadian ice hockey player

Gord "Jack" Reid
- Born: February 19, 1910 Mount Albert, Ontario, Canada
- Died: November 12, 1994 (aged 84) Bracebridge, Ontario, Canada
- Height: 5 ft 10 in (178 cm)
- Weight: 195 lb (88 kg; 13 st 13 lb)
- Position: Defence
- Shot: Left
- Played for: New York Americans
- Playing career: 1929–1944

Gordon Joseph Reid (February 19, 1910 – November 12, 1994) was a Canadian professional ice hockey defenceman who played in one National Hockey League game for the New York Americans during the 1936–37 season, on December 29, 1936 against the New York Rangers. The rest of his career, which lasted from 1929 to 1944, was spent in the minor leagues.

He died at a hospital in Bracebridge, Ontario in 1994 and was buried alongside his wife, Audrey at the Bracebridge Municipal Cemetery.

== Career statistics ==
=== Regular season and playoffs ===
			Regular season					Playoffs
Season	Team	League	GP	G	A	Pts	PIM	GP	G	A	Pts	PIM
1929–30	Port Colborne Ports	OHA Sr	2	0	0	0	0	2	0	0	0	0
1933–34	Port Colborne Ports	OHA Sr	—	—	—	—	—	—	—	—	—	—
1934–35	New Haven Eagles	Can-Am	47	9	5	14	76	—	—	—	—	—
1935–36	New Haven Eagles	Can-Am	48	3	9	12	102	—	—	—	—	—
1936–37	New York Americans	NHL	1	0	0	0	0	—	—	—	—	—
1936–37	New Haven Eagles	Can-Am	40	0	4	4	54	—	—	—	—	—
1937–38	New Haven Eagles	Can-Am	12	0	1	1	10	—	—	—	—	—
1937–38	Kansas City Greyhounds	AHA	36	3	1	4	50	—	—	—	—	—
1938–39	St. Paul Saints	AHA	46	3	4	7	50	3	0	0	0	2
1939–40	St. Paul Saints	AHA	47	4	19	23	56	7	1	0	1	12
1940–41	St. Paul Saints	AHA	40	3	4	7	30	4	0	0	0	0
1941–42	St. Paul Saints	AHA	50	4	7	11	51	2	1	0	1	5
1942–43	New Haven Eagles	AHL	18	1	2	3	10	—	—	—	—	—
1943–44	Providence Reds	AHL	40	2	8	10	30	—	—	—	—	—
AHA totals			219	17	35	52	238	16	2	0	2	19
NHL totals			1	0	0	0	0	—	—	—	—	—

== See also ==
- List of players who played only one game in the NHL
