= Quenneville =

Quenneville is a surname. Notable people with the name include:

- Claude Quenneville, Canadian sports commentator
- Jason Quenneville (born 1982), Canadian record producer
- Joel Quenneville (born 1958), Canadian-American ice hockey coach
- John Quenneville (born 1996), Canadian ice hockey player
- Leo Quenneville (1900–1986), Canadian ice hockey player
