= West Toronto Nationals =

Canadian junior ice hockey team (1928–1936)

- City: Toronto, Ontario
- League: Ontario Hockey Association
- Operated: 1928–1936
- Home arena: Arena Gardens; Maple Leaf Gardens

Championships
- Playoff championships: 1936 Memorial Cup

The West Toronto Nationals were a Canadian junior ice hockey team in the Ontario Hockey Association (OHA) from 1928 to 1936. The Nationals wore red-coloured sweaters. Home games were played at Arena Gardens, and later at Maple Leaf Gardens.

The Nationals won the J. Ross Robertson Cup as champions of the OHA in 1930, and defeated the Niagara Falls Cataracts by an 11–9 combined score in two games. The Nationals won the Eastern Canada junior playoffs by defeating teams from Sault Ste. Marie, and Ottawa to earn a berth in the 1930 Memorial Cup. Travelling to Winnipeg for a best-of-three series at Shea's Amphitheatre, the Nationals lost game one to the Regina Pats by 3–1 score, were leading game two by a 2–0 score, then conceded three goals to lose the game and the series.

The Nationals were finalists for the J. Ross Robertson Cup in 1931, and were defeated by the Niagara Falls Cataracts by a 12–7 combined score in two games.

In the 1935–36 season, the National were managed by Harold Ballard and coached by Hap Day. The team had not lost a regular season game since February, and defeated the Oshawa Red Devils in the OHA semifinal. The Nationals won the J. Ross Robertson Cup in 1936, by defeating the Kitchener Greenshirts in two games in a best-of-three series. The Nationals were led by Peanuts O'Flaherty, who was the league's leading scorer. The Nationals won the George Richardson Memorial Trophy as Eastern Canada junior playoffs champions by defeating the South Porcupine Porkies, the Junior Quebec Aces, and the Pembroke Lumber Kings. The Nationals earned a berth in the 1936 Memorial Cup played in Toronto, and defeated the Saskatoon Wesleys in two games, by scores of 5–1 and 4–2.

== National Hockey League alumni ==
Roy Conacher played three seasons for the Nationals from 1933 to 1936, was inducted into the Hockey Hall of Fame in 1998.

List of alumni who played in the National Hockey League:

- Norman Collings
- Roy Conacher
- Jack Crawford
- John Doran
- Jimmy Fowler
- Bob Gracie
- Red Heron
- Bill Jennings
- Peanuts O'Flaherty
- George Parsons
- Bill Thoms

== Season-by-season results ==
Regular season and playoffs results:

Legend: GP = Games played, W = Wins, L = Losses, T = Ties, Pts = Points, GF = Goals for, GA = Goals against

Memorial Cup champions	Memorial Cup finalists	OHA champions	OHA finalists

Season	Regular season									Playoffs
Season	GP	W	L	T	Pts	Pct	GF	GA	Finish	Playoffs
1928–29	12	9	3	0	18	0.750	57	24	1st Group 5	Lost group final (Toronto Young Rangers) 8–5
1929–30	9	9	0	0	18	1.000	63	14	1st Group 6	Won group final (Toronto Victorias) 5–2; Won second round (University of Toronto Schools) 14–4; Won third round (Oshawa Shamrocks) 17–1; Won quarterfinals (Kingston Frontenacs) 15–0; Won semifinal (Toronto Varsity Blues) 8–5; Won OHA final (Junior Niagara Falls Cataracts) 11–9; Won Eastern Canada semifinal (Sault Ste. Marie Greyhounds) 6–4; Won Eastern Canada championship (Ottawa Rideaus) 6–5; Lost 1930 Memorial Cup final (Regina Pats) 2–0
1930–31	9	7	2	0	14	0.778	43	16	1st Group 6	Won group final (Toronto Native Sons) 5–1; Won second round (Toronto Canoe Club) 8–4; Won quarterfinal (Oshawa Majors) 4–3; Won semifinal (Owen Sound Greys) 11–5; Lost OHA final (Junior Niagara Falls Cataracts) 12–7
1931–32	10	6	4	0	12	0.600	44	27	2nd Group 5	Won group semifinal (Junior Toronto National Sea Fleas) 3–2; Lost group final (Toronto Marlboros) 2–1–1
1932–33	Did not operate during season									
1933–34	12	2	10	0	4	0.167	25	94	5th Group 7	Did not qualify
1934–35	12	1	10	1	3	0.125	24	55	4th Group 1	Did not qualify
1935–36	10	8	2	0	16	0.800	59	17	2nd Group 1	Won group semifinal (Toronto Young Rangers) 6–3; Won group final (Toronto St. Michael's Majors) 3–0; Won semifinal (Oshawa Red Devils) 2–0; Won OHA final (Kitchener Greenshirts) 2–0; Won Eastern Canada quarterfinal (South Porcupine Porkies) 2–0; Won Eastern Canada semifinal (Junior Quebec Aces) 2–0; Won Eastern Canada final (Pembroke Lumber Kings) 2–0; Won 1936 Memorial Cup (Saskatoon Wesleys) 2–0

== Sources ==
- Lapp, Richard M.; Macaulay, Alec (1997). The Memorial Cup: Canada's National Junior Hockey Championship. Madeira Park, British Columbia: Harbour Publishing. ISBN 1-55017-170-4.
