= Robert Heron =

Robert Heron may refer to:

- Robert Heron (writer) (1764–1807), Scottish writer
- Sir Robert Heron, 2nd Baronet (1765–1854), British Whig politician, Member of Parliament (MP) for Great Grimsby 1812–18 and Peterborough 1819–47
- Red Heron (1917–1990), nickname of Canadian professional ice hockey player Robert Geatrex Heron
