= Ellis Pringle =

Canadian ice hockey player

- Ellis Pringle pictured in a 1949 newspaper
- Born: August 31, 1911; Beeton, Ontario, Canada
- Died: October 3, 1990 (aged 79); Sutton, Ontario, Canada
- Height: 6 ft 2 in (188 cm)
- Weight: 205 lb (93 kg; 14 st 9 lb)
- Position: Defense
- Shot: Left
- Played for: New York Americans
- Playing career: 1930–1939

William Ellis Delenbough "Ellie" Pringle (August 31, 1911 – October 3, 1990), known as Ellis Pringle, was a Canadian professional ice hockey defenceman who played 6 games in the National Hockey League for the New York Americans during the 1930–31 season. The rest of his career, which lasted from 1930 to 1942, was spent in various minor leagues. Ellis was born in Beeton, Ontario and was the son of Walter Alvin Pringle and Mable Maude Campbell Ellis.

== Career statistics ==
=== Regular season and playoffs ===
			Regular season					Playoffs
Season	Team	League	GP	G	A	Pts	PIM	GP	G	A	Pts	PIM
1928–29	Toronto Marlboros	OHA	9	6	0	6	—	2	1	0	1	—
1928–29	Newmarket Redmen	OHA	—	—	—	—	—	—	—	—	—	—
1929–30	Toronto Marlboros	OHA	8	0	0	0	22	—	—	—	—	—
1929–30	Toronto Willys-Overland	TMHL	—	—	—	—	—	—	—	—	—	—
1930–31	New York Americans	NHL	6	0	0	0	0	—	—	—	—	—
1930–31	New Haven Eagles	Can-Am	30	3	1	4	66	—	—	—	—	—
1931–32	Bronx Tigers	Can-Am	38	2	3	5	83	2	0	0	0	0
1932–33	New Haven Eagles	Can-Am	42	5	3	8	103	—	—	—	—	—
1933–34	Windsor Bulldogs	IHL	44	0	0	0	82	—	—	—	—	—
1934–35	London Tecumsehs	IHL	25	3	1	4	58	—	—	—	—	—
1934–35	St. Paul Saints	CHL	15	2	3	5	36	—	—	—	—	—
1935–36	London Tecumsehs	IHL	20	1	1	2	29	—	—	—	—	—
1935–36	Rochester Cardinals	IHL	16	1	3	4	30	—	—	—	—	—
1936–37	Tulsa Oilers	AHA	48	4	7	11	72	—	—	—	—	—
1937–38	Vancouver Lions	PCHL	38	2	5	7	56	6	2	0	2	6
1938–39	Vancouver Lions	PCHL	43	6	9	15	37	2	0	0	0	4
1939–40	Toronto Red Indians	TIHL	5	0	2	2	6	3	0	1	1	0
1940–41	Toronto Red Indians	TIHL	5	0	2	2	6	3	0	1	1	0
1941–42	Toronto Dehavillands	TMHL	20	1	1	2	0	7	1	1	2	20
1941–42	Sutton Greenshirts	OHA Int	—	—	—	—	—	—	—	—	—	—
Can-Am totals			110	10	7	17	252	2	0	0	0	0
IHL totals			105	5	5	10	199	—	—	—	—	—
NHL totals			6	0	0	0	0	—	—	—	—	—
