= Bronx Tigers =

Minor-league professional ice hockey team

The Bronx Tigers were a minor professional ice hockey team that played in the Canadian-American Hockey League (CAHL) in 1931–32.

They were also an amateur team that played in the Eastern Amateur Hockey League (EAHL) in 1933–34 and 1937–38. The amateur team played in the Bronx Coliseum on East 177th Street in the borough of Bronx in New York City, New York.

== Standings ==
=== CAHL ===
In 1931–32 they finished with an 18-15-7 W-L-T record, good for fourth place. They lost the semi-final.

=== EHL ===
They finished out of the playoffs in both of their EHL seasons.

== Notable players ==
The following members of the Bronx Tigers (CAHL) also played in the NHL:

- Andy Aitkenhead
- Oscar Asmundson
- Frank Beisler
- Billy Boucher
- Leo Bourgeault
- Gene Chouinard
- Jake Forbes
- Frank Foyston
- Len Grosvenor
- Roger Jenkins
- Buddy Maracle
- George Massecar
- Gord Pettinger
- Hal Picketts
- Ellie Pringle
- Bill Regan
- Johnny Sheppard
