= Bill Regan (ice hockey) =

Canadian ice hockey player

- Born: December 11, 1908; Creighton Mine, Ontario, Canada
- Died: February 16, 1995 (aged 86)
- Height: 6 ft 1 in (185 cm)
- Weight: 190 lb (86 kg; 13 st 8 lb)
- Position: Defence
- Shot: Left
- Played for: New York Americans; New York Rangers
- Playing career: 1929–1934

William Donald Regan (December 11, 1908 – February 16, 1995) was a Canadian professional ice hockey player who played 67 games in the National Hockey League with the New York Rangers and New York Americans between 1930 and 1933. The rest of his career, which lasted from 1929 to 1934, was spent in the minor leagues. He was born in Creighton Mine, Ontario, now part of Greater Sudbury.

== Playing career ==
Regan began his professional career in 1929, playing for the Boston Tigers, although later that season he was traded to the New York Rangers. He subsequently played for the Bronx Tigers, the Springfield Indians and the New Haven Eagles before being traded to the New York Americans. He ended his career (1934) playing for the Cleveland Indians, though briefly played senior hockey during the 1936–37 season.

== Career statistics ==
=== Regular season and playoffs ===
			Regular season					Playoffs
Season	Team	League	GP	G	A	Pts	PIM	GP	G	A	Pts	PIM
1925–26	Toronto St. Michael's Majors	OHA	5	2	1	3	—	—	—	—	—	—
1926–27	Toronto St. Michael's Majors	OHA	1	0	0	0	—	6	4	1	5	—
1927–28	Toronto St. Michael's Majors	OHA	6	12	3	15	—	6	2	2	4	—
1928–29	Toronto St. Michael's Majors	OHA	6	3	4	7	—	—	—	—	—	—
1929–30	Boston Tigers	Can-Am	28	6	5	11	45	—	—	—	—	—
1929–30	New York Rangers	NHL	9	0	0	0	2	4	0	0	0	0
1930–31	New York Rangers	NHL	42	2	1	3	53	4	0	0	0	2
1931–32	Bronx Tigers	Can-Am	40	5	10	15	106	2	0	0	0	6
1932–33	Springfield Indians	Can-Am	13	1	2	3	30	—	—	—	—	—
1932–33	New York Americans	NHL	15	1	1	2	14	—	—	—	—	—
1932–33	New Haven Eagles	Can-Am	15	7	3	10	32	—	—	—	—	—
1933–34	Cleveland Indians	IHL	45	9	13	22	85	—	—	—	—	—
1936–37	Creighton Mines	GBHL	13	2	0	2	34	2	0	0	0	8
1936–37	Sudbury Food Miners	NBHL	—	—	—	—	—	6	1	1	2	4
Can-Am totals			96	19	20	39	213	2	0	0	0	6
NHL totals			66	3	2	5	69	8	0	0	0	2
