= Bill Benson (ice hockey) =

Canadian ice hockey player

- Born: July 29, 1920 Winnipeg, Manitoba, Canada
- Died: February 8, 2012 (aged 91) Winnipeg, Manitoba, Canada
- Height: 5 ft 11 in (180 cm)
- Weight: 160 lb (73 kg; 11 st 6 lb)
- Position: Centre
- Shot: Left
- Played for: New York Americans; Brooklyn Americans
- Playing career: 1937–1950

William Lloyd Benson (July 29, 1920 – February 8, 2012) was a Canadian professional ice hockey centreman who played two NHL seasons with the New York Americans, and Brooklyn Americans. He was born in Winnipeg, Manitoba.

Benson was the last surviving former player of the New York Americans.

== Career statistics ==
=== Regular season and playoffs ===
| | | | Regular season | | | | | Playoffs |
| Season | Team | League | GP | G | A | Pts | PIM | GP | G | A | Pts | PIM |
|---|---|---|---|---|---|---|---|---|---|---|---|---|
| 1937–38 | Winnipeg Monarchs | MJHL | 20 | 7 | 10 | 17 | 2 | 5 | 1 | 3 | 4 | 0 |
| 1938–39 | Winnipeg Monarchs | MJHL | 21 | 18 | 12 | 30 | 2 | 7 | 6 | 3 | 9 | 2 |
| 1939–40 | Winnipeg Monarchs | MJHL | 24 | 19 | 20 | 39 | 16 | — | — | — | — | — |
| 1940–41 | New York Americans | NHL | 22 | 3 | 4 | 7 | 4 | — | — | — | — | — |
| 1940–41 | Springfield Indians | AHL | 22 | 3 | 6 | 9 | 4 | — | — | — | — | — |
| 1941–42 | Brooklyn Americans | NHL | 45 | 8 | 21 | 29 | 31 | — | — | — | — | — |
| 1942–43 | Sydney Navy | NSDHL | 3 | 3 | 4 | 7 | 0 | — | — | — | — | — |
| 1942–43 | Winnipeg Navy | WNDHL | — | — | — | — | — | 2 | 1 | 0 | 1 | 0 |
| 1945–46 | Cleveland Barons | AHL | 14 | 3 | 4 | 7 | 4 | 9 | 0 | 0 | 0 | 2 |
| 1946–47 | Pittsburgh Hornets | AHL | 64 | 20 | 22 | 42 | 26 | 12 | 4 | 3 | 7 | 4 |
| 1947–48 | Pittsburgh Hornets | AHL | 65 | 18 | 20 | 38 | 13 | 2 | 0 | 0 | 0 | 0 |
| 1948–49 | Pittsburgh Hornets | AHL | 67 | 18 | 22 | 40 | 24 | — | — | — | — | — |
| 1949–50 | Pittsburgh Hornets | AHL | 63 | 15 | 13 | 28 | 0 | — | — | — | — | — |
| AHL totals | | | 295 | 77 | 87 | 164 | 71 | 23 | 4 | 3 | 7 | 6 |
| NHL totals | | | 67 | 11 | 25 | 36 | 35 | — | — | — | — | — |

== Awards and achievements ==
- MJHL Scoring Champion (1940)
- Honoured Member of the Manitoba Hockey Hall of Fame
