= Newark Bulldogs =

- City: Newark, New Jersey
- League: Canadian–American Hockey League
- Operated: 1928–1929
- Home arena: none
- Colors: Maroon, Cream

Franchise history
- 1926–1928: Quebec Castors
- 1928–1929: Newark Bulldogs

The Newark Bulldogs were a professional ice hockey team. Based in Newark, New Jersey, they operated within the Canadian–American Hockey League for one season but were unable to secure a home arena.

== History ==
In the late 1920s, the success of the Madison Square Garden convinced its operators to expand their business elsewhere. A second 'MSG' was built in Boston (later known as the Boston Garden) and plans were put into place for a third in New Jersey. Before the land for the third Garden was even purchased, the Quebec Castors were bought with the purpose of moving the team to New Jersey for the start of the 1928 season. Delays in construction were caused by a lack of investing but most appeared to remain optimistic about the new team. By late October, just before the start of the season, the team finally admitted publicly that their proposed home would not be ready any time soon. The team's home games were shared among other Can-Am sites in Philadelphia, Providence and Springfield and the team essentially played on the road for the entire year. A reporter from the Boston Globe named the team the 'Newark Orphans' but, despite their troubles, the club soldiered on.

Head coach Sprague Cleghorn held the team together as best he could. Predictably, however, the Bulldogs did not fare well and finished fifth out of six teams. There were bright spots during the year; Corbett Denneny turned in a wonderful offensive season despite missing 13 games to injury while Nick Wasnie finished in the top 5 in league scoring. None of their on-ice play could distract from the lack of a home venue, however. The team hoped that work on the Newark Madison Square Garden would begin soon but as the weeks and months passed those hopes faded. Before the start of the following season, the team was granted permission to suspend play for the year while they attempted to secure enough investment to build their home rink. However, a few weeks after suspending, the stock market crashed and all plans for the expansion into Newark were abandoned.

== Season-by-season results ==
Season	GP	W	L	T	Pts	Finish	Coach(es)	Postseason
1928–29	40	14	26	0	34	5th	Sprague Cleghorn	missed
