= 1936 Memorial Cup =

Canadian junior ice hockey championship

The Memorial Cup trophy

The 1936 Memorial Cup final was the 18th junior ice hockey championship of the Canadian Amateur Hockey Association. The George Richardson Memorial Trophy champions West Toronto Nationals of the Ontario Hockey Association in Eastern Canada competed against the Abbott Cup champions Saskatoon Wesleys of the Saskatchewan Junior Hockey League in Western Canada. In a best-of-three series, held at Maple Leaf Gardens in Toronto, Ontario, West Toronto won their 1st Memorial Cup, defeating Saskatoon 2 games to 0.

== Scores ==
- Game 1: West Toronto 5-1 Saskatoon
- Game 2: West Toronto 4-2 Saskatoon

== Winning roster ==
Bert Conacher, Roy Conacher, Bucky Crawford, D. Fritz, Carl Gamble, Ginger Hall, Red Heron, Bill Jennings, Bob Laurent, F. Murray, Peanut O'Flaherty, Ted Robertson, Gord Shill, Bill Thomson. Coach: Hap Day
