= Red Heron =

Canadian ice hockey player

- Born: December 31, 1917; Toronto, Ontario, Canada
- Died: December 14, 1990 (aged 72)
- Height: 5 ft 10 in (178 cm)
- Weight: 170 lb (77 kg; 12 st 2 lb)
- Position: Left wing
- Shot: Right
- Played for: Montreal Canadiens; Brooklyn Americans; Toronto Maple Leafs
- Playing career: 1938–1942

Robert Greatrex "Red" Heron (December 31, 1917 — December 14, 1990) was a Canadian ice hockey player who played 106 games in the National Hockey League between 1938 and 1942 for the Toronto Maple Leafs, Brooklyn Americans, and Montreal Canadiens. The rest of his career, which lasted from 1938 to 1942, was spent in the minor leagues.

== Career statistics ==
=== Regular season and playoffs ===
			Regular season					Playoffs
Season	Team	League	GP	G	A	Pts	PIM	GP	G	A	Pts	PIM
1932–33	Toronto Marlboros	OHA Jr	9	4	1	5	4	3	0	0	0	2
1933–34	Toronto Native Sons	OHA Jr	12	11	7	18	7	—	—	—	—	—
1934–35	West Toronto Nationals	OHA Jr	12	3	1	4	14	—	—	—	—	—
1935–36	West Toronto Nationals	OHA Jr	9	11	6	17	16	5	6	4	10	2
1935–36	Toronto Goodyears	OHA Sr	13	16	1	17	4	6	4	2	6	9
1935–36	West Toronto Nationals	M-Cup	—	—	—	—	—	12	18	8	26	20
1936–37	Toronto Goodyears	OHA Sr	8	5	3	8	16	5	3	0	3	8
1937–38	Toronto Goodyears	OHA Sr	16	21	15	36	6	6	3	2	5	4
1937–38	Syracuse Stars	IAHL	1	0	0	0	0	6	1	2	3	0
1938–39	Toronto Maple Leafs	NHL	6	0	0	0	0	2	0	0	0	4
1938–39	Syracuse Stars	IAHL	46	12	14	26	26	3	0	1	1	10
1939–40	Toronto Maple Leafs	NHL	42	11	12	23	12	9	2	0	2	2
1939–40	Pittsburgh Hornets	IAHL	4	3	3	6	0	—	—	—	—	—
1940–41	Toronto Maple Leafs	NHL	35	9	5	14	12	7	0	2	2	0
1940–41	Pittsburgh Hornets	AHL	2	2	0	2	0	—	—	—	—	—
1941–42	Brooklyn Americans	NHL	11	0	1	1	2	—	—	—	—	—
1941–42	Springfield Indians	AHL	7	3	3	6	2	—	—	—	—	—
1941–42	Montreal Canadiens	NHL	12	1	1	2	12	3	0	0	0	0
1941–42	Pittsburgh Hornets	AHL	23	20	16	36	10	—	—	—	—	—
1942–43	Toronto Research Colonels	TMHL	12	22	12	34	4	—	—	—	—	—
1942–43	Toronto People's Credit	TIHL	5	5	4	9	8	7	8	10	18	12
1943–44	Toronto RCAF	OHA Sr	15	6	10	16	12	—	—	—	—	—
1943–44	Toronto Staffords	TMHL	6	9	5	14	4	9	9	5	14	8
1944–45	Rockcliffe RCAF	ONDHL	—	—	—	—	—	2	0	2	2	0
1946–47	Toronto Barkers	TIHL	26	37	25	62	6	6	9	3	12	4
1947–48	Toronto Barkers	TIHL	26	23	17	40	10	9	10	6	16	18
1948–49	Toronto Barkers	TIHL	6	1	4	5	6	4	3	0	3	4
NHL totals			106	21	19	40	38	21	2	2	4	6
