= 1930 Memorial Cup =

Canadian junior ice hockey championship

The Memorial Cup trophy

The 1930 Memorial Cup final was the 12th junior ice hockey championship of the Canadian Amateur Hockey Association. The George Richardson Memorial Trophy champions West Toronto Nationals of the Ontario Hockey Association in Eastern Canada competed against the Abbott Cup champions Regina Pats of the South Saskatchewan Junior Hockey League in Western Canada. In a best-of-three series, held at Shea's Amphitheatre in Winnipeg, Manitoba, Regina won their 2nd Memorial Cup, defeating West Toronto 2 games to none.

== Scores ==
- Game 1: Regina 3-1 West Toronto
- Game 2: Regina 3-2 West Toronto

== Winning roster ==
Yates Acaster, Frank Boll, Art Dowie, Joe Dutkowski, Ken Campbell, Dave Gilhooley, Lon McPherson, Ken Moore, Gordon Pettinger, Len Rae, Ralph Redding, Eddie Wiseman. Coach: Al Ritchie
