= 1937 Allan Cup =

Canadian senior ice hockey championship

The Allan Cup trophy

The 1937 Allan Cup was the Canadian Amateur Hockey Association (CAHA) national senior ice hockey championship for the 1936–37 season. The Sudbury Tigers defeated the North Battleford Beavers 3 games to 2.

== National playoffs ==
The Quebec Amateur Hockey Association (QAHA) protested the selection of Calgary as the location for the 1937 Allan Cup finals. CAHA president Cecil Duncan stated the choice was made based on where the CAHA felt interest would be greatest and remained firm on the decision. The Montreal Senior Group then stated its league would not be represented in the Allan Cup playoffs in the protest. Duncan inquired directly with the Quebec Aces as the league champions, and reached an agreement for the team to participate in the playoffs despite the protest.

=== Allan Cup final ===
Sudbury Tigers defeated the North Battleford Beavers 3 games to 2 in the best-of-five series.

- Sudbury 4 North Battleford 1
- Sudbury 6 North Battleford 3
- North Battleford 7 Sudbury 5
- North Battleford 3 Sudbury 2
- Sudbury 5 North Battleford 2

== International playoffs ==
The CAHA arranged an international tournament aimed to determine a world's amateur club team champion, hosted at Maple Leaf Gardens in Toronto, and invited the champions of the Allan Cup and the Memorial Cup, the Eastern Amateur Hockey League and the English National League. The tournament coincided with national teams playing at the 1937 Ice Hockey World Championships held at the same time in England. The world's amateur title was contested by the Wembley Lions, the Hershey Bears, the Sudbury Tigers, and the Winnipeg Monarchs. The schedule was a six-game double round-robin tournament from April 17 to 24, followed by a best-of-three game final series among the top two teams.

CAHA representative W. A. Hewitt announced the shortening of the series due to poor attendance. The game between Hershey and Winnipeg was cancelled as both teams went home early, then tournament was completed by and a best-of-three series between Sudbury and Wembley. Sudbury and Wembley completed the best-of-three series each with a win, loss and tie. Since Wembley had travel plans to return to Europe, the series was decided by sudden death overtime period played immediately after the third game finished. Sudbury then won the series on a goal by George Hastie in the fifteenth minute of play.
