= Quebec Castors =

- City: Quebec City, Quebec
- League: Canadian–American Hockey League
- Operated: 1926–1935
- Colors: Blue, White

Franchise history
- First Franchise
- 1926–1928: Quebec Castors
- 1928–1929: Newark Bulldogs
- Second Franchise
- 1932–1935: Quebec Castors
- 1935–1951: Springfield Indians
- 1951–1954: Syracuse Warriors
- 1954–1967: Springfield Indians
- 1967–1974: Springfield Kings
- 1974–1994: Springfield Indians
- 1994–2005: Worcester IceCats
- 2005–2013: Peoria Rivermen
- 2013–2021: Utica Comets
- 2021–present: Abbotsford Canucks

The Quebec Castors or Quebec Beavers were two professional ice hockey teams based in Quebec City, Quebec from 1926 until 1928 and then from 1932 to 1935. They were both members of the Canadian–American Hockey League (CAHL).

== History ==
The first team began play in 1926 and were led by player/coach Louis Berlinquette. Newsy Lalonde took over for the team's second season but, despite possessing a decent record, the team was put up for sale midway through the year. When they were sold, the new owners made it clear that their intention was to move the team to New Jersey for the next year and they followed through on those plans.

Four years afterwards, the name was resurrected by Lucien Garneau, who founded the second Castors franchise. The team was less successful than the first but their main obstacle was navigating the uncertain economic waters during the Great Depression. After three years, Garneau moved the team South and the franchise was renamed the 'Springfield Indians'.
