= Canadian–American Hockey League =

Predecessor of the American Hockey League

- Sport: Ice hockey
- Founded: 1926; 100 years ago
- Folded: 1936; 90 years ago
- No. of teams: 6 (max)
- Countries: Canada; United States
- Last champion: Philadelphia Ramblers
- Most titles: Springfield Indians (3)

The Canadian–American Hockey League (CAHL), popularly known as the Can-Am League, was a professional ice hockey league that operated from 1926 to 1936. It was a direct predecessor of the American Hockey League.

The organization of the league was announced on March 23, 1926, with the working title of "American Hockey League", to have franchises in New York, Providence, Boston and Montreal, and plans for a possible expansion into New Haven, Springfield, Newark and Jersey City.

For its first ten years the CAHL's membership varied between five and six teams, including teams in three of the four additional cities considered possibilities in March 1926 (the exception being Jersey City). However, when the Boston Bruin Cubs dropped out after the 1935–36 season, the league was reduced to just four active teams: Philadelphia, Providence, Springfield, and New Haven. At the same time, the International Hockey League, founded in 1929, had also been cut down to just four teams; Syracuse, Buffalo, Pittsburgh, and Cleveland. With both leagues at the bare minimum number of teams to be viable, they decided to form a temporary "circuit of mutual convenience" known as the International-American Hockey League (IAHL). For the next two years, the two leagues played an interlocking schedule with the CAHL clubs serving as the IAHL's Eastern Division and the IHL as its Western Division.

At a meeting held in New York City on June 28, 1938, the two leagues formally merged into a unified circuit operating under the IAHL name. The newly merged league granted an expansion franchise to the Eastern Amateur Hockey League's then three-time defending champion Hershey Bears, as a replacement for defunct Buffalo club. This allowed the IAHL to play a balanced schedule for the first time since Buffalo disbanded midway through its first season. The league shortened its name to the current American Hockey League in 1940.

Two current AHL franchises have roots in the CAHL. The Hartford Wolf Pack is descended from the Providence Reds franchise, which moved to Binghamton, New York, in 1977 before moving to Hartford, Connecticut in 1997. The Abbotsford Canucks are descended from the Springfield Indians franchise, which moved to Worcester, Massachusetts, in 1994 before relocating to Peoria, Illinois in 2005, to Utica, New York in 2013, and to Abbotsford, British Columbia, in 2021. With heritages dating to 1926 and 1932, respectively, the Wolf Pack and Canucks are the oldest minor league hockey franchises in North America.

== Teams ==
- Boston Tigers (named Tigers from 1926–1931 and in 1935, Cubs from 1931–1933, Tiger Cubs in 1933–34 and Bruin Cubs from 1934–1936)
- Bronx Tigers (1931–32)
- New Haven Eagles (1926–27 to 1935–36; joins IAHL)
- Newark Bulldogs (1928–29)
- Philadelphia Arrows (1927–28 to 1934–35)
- Philadelphia Ramblers (1935–36; joins IAHL)
- Quebec Castors (Beavers) (two separate franchises; first: 1926–27 to 1927–28, became the Newark Bulldogs; second: 1932–33 to 1934–35, became the Springfield Indians)
- Providence Reds (1926–27 to 1935–36; joins IAHL)
- Springfield Indians (two separate franchises; first: 1926–27 to 1932–33, folded; second: 1935–36, joins IAHL)

== Champions ==
The playoffs championship trophy was known as the Henri Fontaine Cup.

Season	Regular season	Playoffs
1926–27	New Haven Eagles	Springfield Indians
1927–28	Springfield Indians	Springfield Indians
1928–29	Boston Tigers	Boston Tigers
1929–30	Providence Reds	Providence Reds
1930–31	Springfield Indians	Springfield Indians
1931–32	Providence Reds	Providence Reds
1932–33	Philadelphia Arrows	Boston Cubs
1933–34	Providence Reds	Providence Reds
1934–35	Boston Bruin Cubs	Boston Bruin Cubs
1935–36	Philadelphia Ramblers	Philadelphia Ramblers

== See also ==
- List of ice hockey leagues
