= New York Americans =

Ice hockey team

- Founded: 1925
- History: New York Americans; 1925–1941; Brooklyn Americans; 1941–1942
- Home arena: Madison Square Garden
- City: New York City, New York
- Team colors: Red, white, blue

The New York Americans, colloquially known as the Amerks, were a professional ice hockey team based in New York City from 1925 to 1942. They were the third expansion team in the history of the National Hockey League (NHL) and the second to play in the United States. The team never won the Stanley Cup, but reached the semifinals twice. While it was the first team in New York City, it was eclipsed by the second, the New York Rangers, which arrived in 1926 under the ownership of the Amerks' landlord, Madison Square Garden. The team played as the Brooklyn Americans during the 1941–42 season before suspending operations in 1942 due to World War II and long-standing financial difficulties. For what would be its last six years, the team was effectively a ward of the NHL. The demise of the club marked the beginning of the NHL's Original Six era from 1942 to 1967, though the Amerks' franchise was not formally canceled until 1946. The team's overall regular season record was 255–402–127.

== History ==
=== Formation ===
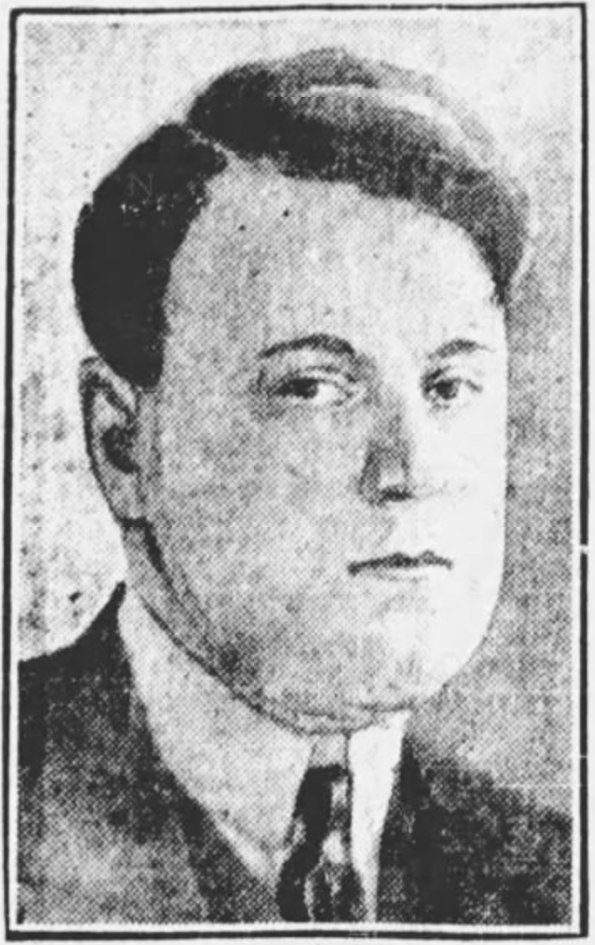
Tom Duggan.

In 1923, Canadian sports promoter Thomas Duggan received options on three NHL franchises for the United States. He sold one to Boston grocery magnate Charles Adams, which became the Boston Bruins in 1924. Duggan then arranged with Tex Rickard to have a team in Madison Square Garden. Rickard agreed, but play was delayed until the new Garden was built in 1925. In April 1925, Duggan and Bill Dwyer, New York City's most-celebrated Prohibition bootlegger, were awarded the franchise for New York. Somewhat fortuitously given the shortage of players, the Hamilton Tigers, who had finished first the season before, had been suspended from the league after they struck for higher pay. However, the suspensions were quietly lifted in the off-season. Soon afterward, Dwyer duly bought the collective rights to the Tigers' players for $75,000. He gave the players healthy raises – in some cases, double their 1924–25 season's salaries. Just before the season, Dwyer announced the team would be known as the New York Americans. Their original jerseys were covered with stars and stripes, patterned after the American flag. Although he acquired the Tigers' players, Dwyer did not acquire the franchise as it was expelled from the league. As a result, the NHL does not consider the Americans to be a continuation of the Tigers, or for that matter the Tigers' predecessors, the Quebec Bulldogs. The Americans entered the league in the 1925–26 season along with the Pittsburgh Pirates, becoming the second and third American-based teams in the NHL, following Adams' Boston Bruins who had begun play during the 1924–25 season.

=== NHL years ===
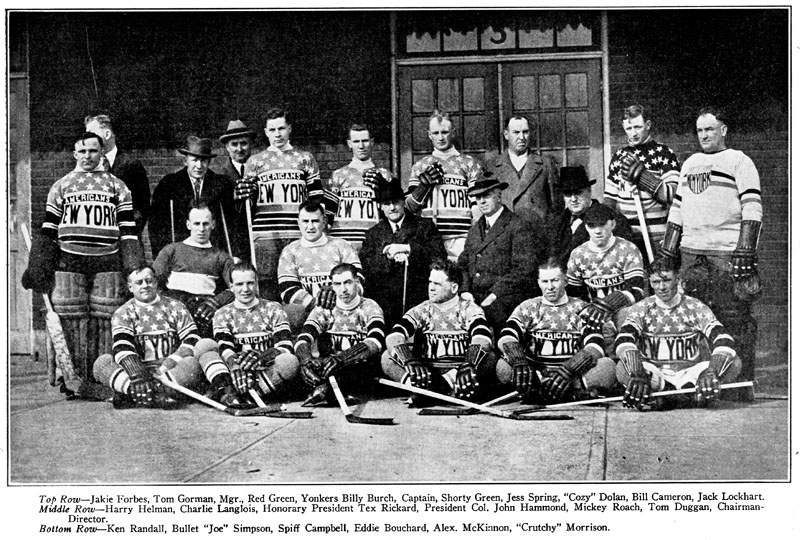
The 1925–26 New York Americans team

The Americans played their first home game at the Garden, losing 3–1 to the Montreal Canadiens in front of 17,000 people. However, success did not come easily for the Americans. Despite icing essentially the same team that finished first the previous year, they finished fifth overall in their first season with a record of 12–22–4. However, they were a success at the box office, so much so that the following season Garden management sought a team of its own. A clause in the Amerks' lease with the Garden required them to support any bid for the Garden to acquire its own NHL franchise. The Garden had promised Dwyer that it would never exercise that option, and that the Amerks would be the only team in the arena. However, when the Garden opted to seek a house team after all, the Amerks had little choice but to agree to the creation of what became the New York Rangers.

The 1926–27 season saw the Americans continue to struggle, finishing 17–25–2. Part of the problem was that they were placed in the Canadian Division in defiance of all geographic reality, resulting in a larger number of train trips to Montreal, Toronto and Ottawa. Meanwhile, the Rangers won the American Division title. The next season saw the Americans fall even further by finishing last in their division (ninth overall) with a record of 11–27–6, while the Rangers captured the Stanley Cup in only their second year of existence. The Americans were thus doomed to a long history as New York City's second team.

The 1928–29 season saw the Amerks sign star goaltender Roy Worters from the Pittsburgh Pirates. He led the team to a 19–13–12 record in that season, good enough for second in the Canadian Division (fourth overall). Worters had a 1.21 goals against average (GAA), becoming the first goaltender to win the Hart Trophy as the most valuable player in the league. Standing on Worters' shoulders, the Americans made the playoffs for the first time, but were unable to beat the Rangers in a total-goals series. The Rangers had extreme difficulty scoring against Worters, but the futile Americans were equally unable to score against the Rangers. The Rangers ended up winning the series in the second game, 1–0 in overtime.

The following season saw the Americans plunge to fifth place in the division (ninth overall) with a 14–25–5 record. Worters followed up his stellar 1928–29 season with an atrocious 3.75 GAA. Worters rebounded the next season, with a 1.68 GAA. That was good enough to give the Americans a winning record. However, they missed out on a playoff berth since the Montreal Maroons had two more wins, which was the NHL's first tiebreaker for playoff seeding.

The 1931–32 season saw some developments that changed the way ice hockey was played. In a game against the Bruins, the Americans iced the puck 61 times. At that time, there was no rule against icing. Adams was so angry that he pressed, to no avail, for the NHL to make a rule against icing, so the next time the two teams met, the Bruins iced the puck 87 times in a scoreless game. It was not until a few years later that the NHL made a rule prohibiting icing, but those two games were the catalyst for change.

New York Americans logo from 1926–1938 period.

The Americans' lackluster on-ice performance was not the only problem for the franchise. With the end of Prohibition, Dwyer was finding it difficult to make ends meet. After the 1933–34 season, having missed the playoffs for the fifth straight year, the Americans attempted a merger with the equally strapped Ottawa Senators, only to be turned down by the NHL Board of Governors. During the 1935–36 season, Dwyer decided to sell the team. As fortunes had it, the Americans made the playoffs for the first time in six years under player-coach Red Dutton, but bowed out in the second round against the Toronto Maple Leafs. Even with this rebound, no buyers came forward, prompting Dwyer to abandon the team. The league announced a takeover of the team for the next season. Dwyer sued the NHL, saying it had no authority to seize his team. A settlement was reached whereby Dwyer could resume control provided he could pay off his debts by the end of the season. However, Dwyer could not do so, and the NHL took full control of the franchise. Despite the presence of Dutton, who had retired as a player to become coach and general manager, the team fared no better under the league's operation than before, finishing last with a record of 15–29–4. The only bright spot was Sweeney Schriner, who led the league in scoring that year.

The league asked Dutton to become operating head of the franchise for the 1937–38 season. The Americans signed veterans Ching Johnson and Hap Day and acquired goaltender Earl Robertson. These new acquisitions greatly helped the team as they finished the season with a 19–18–11 record and made the playoffs. In the playoffs, they beat the Rangers in three games, but lost to the Chicago Black Hawks in three.

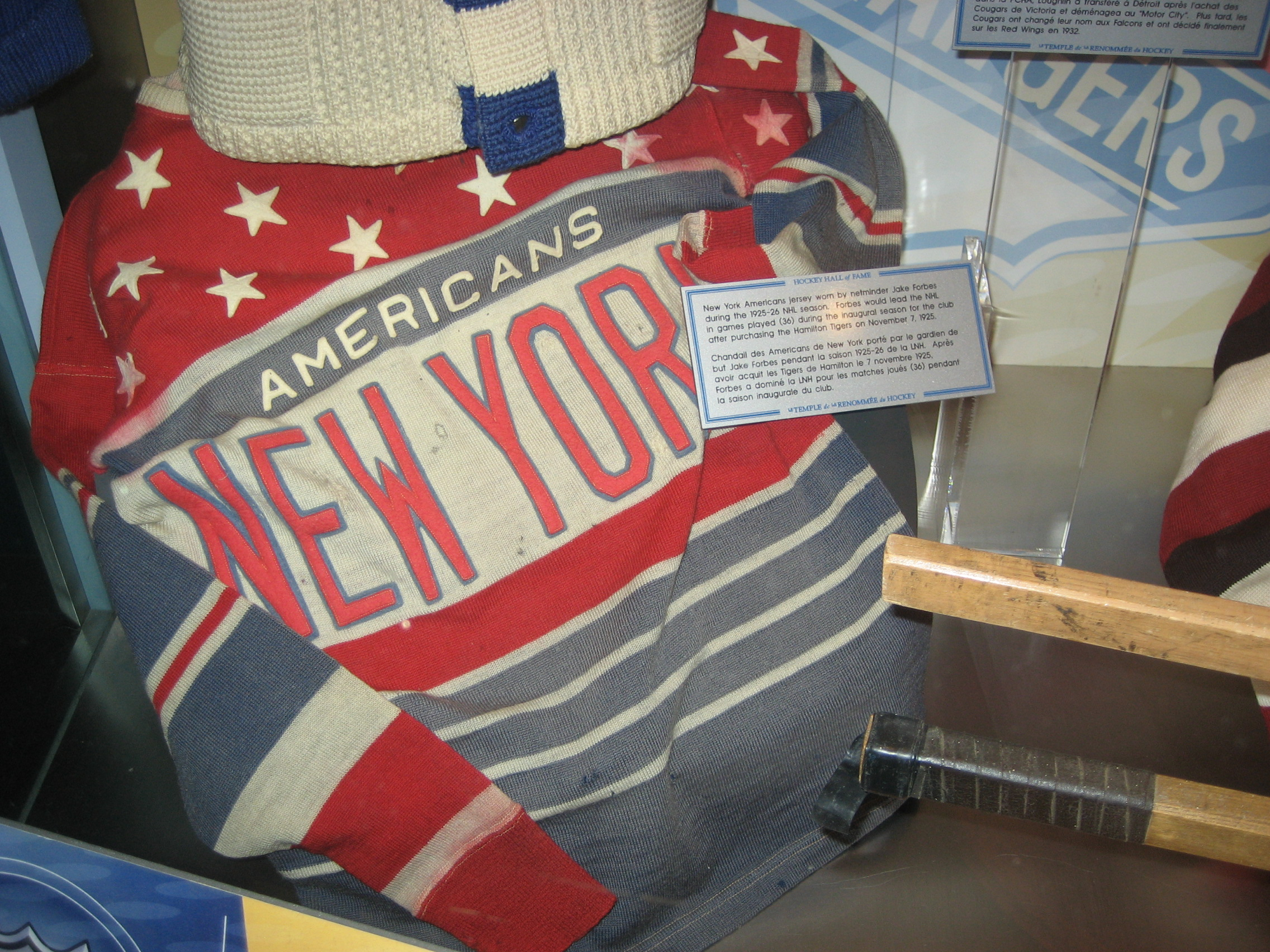
Team jersey on display in the Hockey Hall of Fame.

The Americans made the playoffs again in the 1938–39 and 1939–40 seasons, but were bounced in the first round both times. Canada entered World War II in September 1939, and some of the team's Canadian players left for military service. An even larger number of players entered the military in 1940–41. With a decimated roster, the Americans missed the playoffs with a record of 8–29–11, the worst in franchise history. While the league's other teams were similarly hard-hit, Dutton was still bogged down by lingering debt from the Dwyer era. This debt, combined with the depletion of talent and wartime travel restrictions, forced Dutton to sell off his best players for cash. The Amerks were clearly living on borrowed time; it was only a matter of when, not if, they would fold.

=== "Brooklyn" Americans ===
At wit's end, Dutton changed the team's name for the 1941–42 season to the Brooklyn Americans. He intended to move the team to Brooklyn, but there was no arena in that borough suitable enough even for temporary use. As a result, they continued to play their home games in Manhattan at Madison Square Garden while practicing in Brooklyn. They barely survived the season, finishing last for the second year in a row with a record of 16–29–3. After the season, the Amerks suspended operations for the war's duration. In 1945, a group emerged willing to build a new arena in Brooklyn. However, in 1946, the NHL reneged on previous promises to reinstate the Amerks and canceled the franchise. Although Dutton had every intention of returning the Amerks to the ice after World War II, NHL records list the Amerks as having "retired" from the league in 1942.

=== Legacy ===
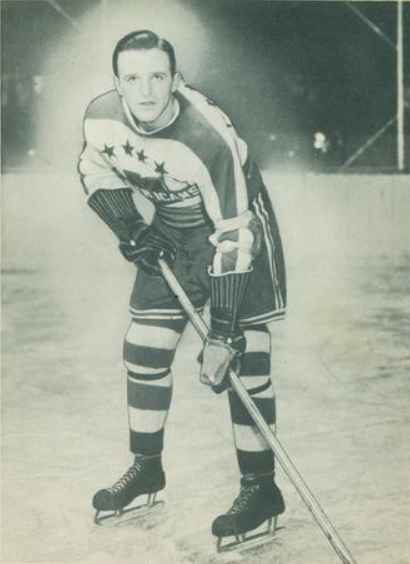
Tommy Anderson was the final captain of the Americans in 1942 and won the Hart Trophy, becoming one of a rare group to win the award for a team that did not reach the playoffs.

The NHL did not expand beyond its remaining six teams until the 1967–68 season. Dutton blamed the owners of Madison Square Garden (who also owned the Rangers) for pressuring the NHL to not reinstate the Americans. Dutton was so bitter that he purportedly swore the Rangers would never win a Stanley Cup again in his lifetime. This "curse" became reality; the Rangers did not win another Cup until 1994, seven years after his death.

The last active New York Americans player in the NHL was goaltender Chuck Rayner, who retired from the NHL in 1953, but played in minor and senior leagues for another three seasons, last with the Nelson Maple Leafs of the Western International Hockey League (WIHL). The last active Brooklyn Americans player was Ken Mosdell, who retired in 1959. Notably, former New York Americans defenseman Pat Egan played for the Jacksonville Rockets of the Eastern Hockey League (EHL) as a player-coach in the 1965–66 season.

The 1926–27 Americans team was the first team in professional sports history to have their surnames on the back of their uniform sweaters, along with numbers, although the name practice was short-lived.

The New York metropolitan area did not have a second NHL team again until the establishment of the New York Islanders in nearby Nassau County on Long Island for the 1972–73 season. While the Americans attempted to relocate to Brooklyn in their final years, the Islanders did so, playing at the Barclays Center from 2015 to 2020, although unlike the Americans they continued to be known as the New York Islanders.

The last living former Americans player was Bill Benson, who died aged 91 years on February 8, 2012.

== Season-by-season record ==
Note: GP = Games played, W = Wins, L = Losses, T = Ties, Pts = Points, GF = Goals for, GA = Goals against, PIM = Penalty minutes

Season	GP	W	L	T	Pts	GF	GA	PIM	Finish	Playoffs
1925–26	36	12	20	4	28	68	89	361	5th in NHL	Missed playoffs
1926–27	44	17	25	2	36	82	91	349	4th in Canadian	Missed playoffs
1927–28	44	11	27	6	28	63	128	563	5th in Canadian	Missed playoffs
1928–29	44	19	13	12	50	53	53	486	2nd in Canadian	Lost in quarterfinals, 0–1 (Rangers) (Note: Both second place teams in both divisions played each other in a two-game, total-goals series.)
1929–30	44	14	25	5	33	113	161	372	5th in Canadian	Missed playoffs
1930–31	44	18	16	10	46	76	74	495	4th in Canadian	Missed playoffs
1931–32	48	16	24	8	40	95	142	596	4th in Canadian	Missed playoffs
1932–33	48	15	22	11	41	91	118	460	4th in Canadian	Missed playoffs
1933–34	48	15	23	10	40	104	132	365	4th in Canadian	Missed playoffs
1934–35	48	12	27	9	33	100	142	250	4th in Canadian	Missed playoffs
1935–36	48	16	25	7	39	109	122	392	3rd in Canadian	Won in quarterfinals, 7–5 (Black Hawks) (Note: Both third place teams in both divisions played each other in a two-game, total-goals series.); Lost in semifinals, 1–2 (Maple Leafs)
1936–37	48	15	29	4	34	122	161	481	4th in Canadian	Missed playoffs
1937–38	48	19	18	11	49	110	111	327	2nd in Canadian	Won in quarterfinals, 2–1 (Rangers); Lost in semifinals, 1–2 (Black Hawks)
1938–39	48	17	21	10	44	119	157	276	4th in NHL	Lost in quarterfinals, 0–2 (Maple Leafs)
1939–40	48	15	29	4	34	106	140	236	6th in NHL	Lost in quarterfinals, 1–2 (Red Wings)
1940–41	48	8	29	11	27	99	186	231	7th in NHL	Missed playoffs
1941–42	48	16	29	3	35	133	175	425	7th in NHL	Missed playoffs
Totals	784	255	402	127	637	1,643	2,182	6,665		5 playoff appearances

== Team personnel ==
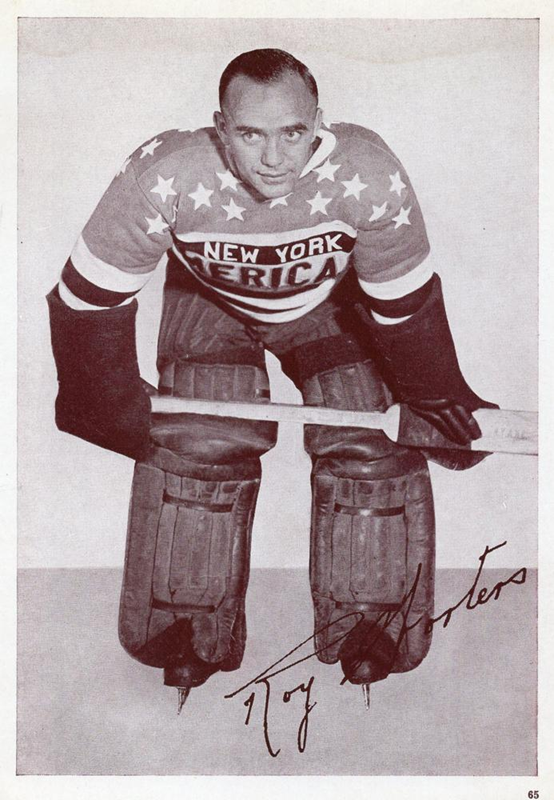
Roy Worters played 360 games for the Americans, the second most in team history; he was inducted into the Hockey Hall of Fame in 1969

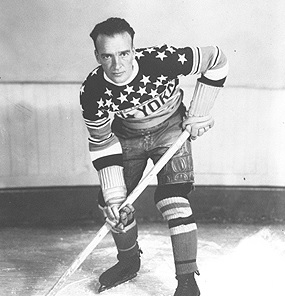
Bullet Joe Simpson played all 228 of his NHL games for the Americans and also coached the team for three seasons; he was inducted into the Hockey Hall of Fame in 1963

=== Hall of Famers ===
- Billy Burch
- Charlie Conacher
- Lionel Conacher
- Red Dutton
- Busher Jackson
- Ching Johnson
- Harry Oliver
- Chuck Rayner
- Sweeney Schriner
- Eddie Shore
- Bullet Joe Simpson
- Hooley Smith
- Nels Stewart
- Harry Watson
- Roy Worters

=== Team captains ===
- Billy Burch, 1925–1932
- Red Dutton, 1932–1936
- Sweeney Schriner, 1936–1939
- Charlie Conacher, 1939–1941
- Tommy Anderson, 1941–1942

=== Coaches ===
- Tommy Gorman, 1925–1926, 1928–1929
- Newsy Lalonde, 1926–1927
- Shorty Green, 1927–1928
- Lionel Conacher, 1929–1930
- Eddie Gerard, 1930–1932
- Bullet Joe Simpson, 1932–1935
- Rosie Helmer, 1935–1936
- Red Dutton, 1935–1940
- Art Chapman, 1940–1942

=== Broadcasters ===
The Americans' radio situation mirrored that of the New York Rangers: same stations, same broadcasters, same announcers; home games only, joined-in-progress. Jack Filman was the principal radio announcer for the Americans on and off until their demise.

A few Americans and Rangers games were on experimental TV stations in 1940–41 and 1941–42 seasons; then public television broadcasting closed down until 1945–46.

== See also ==
- List of New York Americans players
- List of NHL seasons
- List of NHL players
- List of defunct NHL teams
- Curse of 1940

== Bibliography ==
- Duplacey, James (1996). The Rules of Hockey. Dan Diamond And Associates. ISBN 978-0920445440.
