= Anders Sorensen =

Anders Sorensen may refer to:

- Anders Sørensen (born 1962) – Danish professional golfer
- Anders Sörensen (born 1975) – Swedish professional ice hockey coach
