= List of Chicago Blackhawks head coaches =

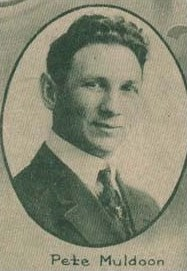
Pete Muldoon was the Blackhawks first head coach.

The Chicago Blackhawks are an American professional ice hockey team based in Chicago, Illinois. They play in the Central Division of the Western Conference in the National Hockey League (NHL). The team was first named the "Chicago Black Hawks", until 1986, when spelling found in the original franchise documents spelled the franchise name as the "Chicago Blackhawks", making the team change its name in response. The team is also referred to as the "Hawks". The Blackhawks began their NHL play in the 1926–27 season as an expansion team with the Detroit Cougars and the New York Rangers, and is one of the Original Six teams. The franchise has 6 Stanley Cup championships, most recently winning in the 2014–15 season. Having played in the Chicago Coliseum (1926–1929) and the Chicago Stadium (1929–1994), the Blackhawks have played their home games at the United Center since 1994. The Blackhawks are owned by the Wirtz Corporation, chaired by Danny Wirtz; Kyle Davidson serves as the team's general manager. The Blackhawks named Nick Foligno as captain in the 2024–25 season, following the team's decision to not re-sign Jonathan Toews for the 2023–24 season.

There have been 42 head coaches for the Blackhawks. The franchise's first head coach was Pete Muldoon, who coached for 44 games in the 1926–27 season. However, he is also well remembered for allegedly "putting a curse" on the Blackhawks, which stipulated that the team would never finish in first in the NHL. The Blackhawks never had a first-place finish until 40 years after that incident. Hughie Lehman, originally the team's goaltender, became the Blackhawks' third head coach after yelling at the first Blackhawks owner, Frederic McLaughlin, that his proposed plays were "the craziest bunch of junk [he had] ever seen".

Orval Tessier became the only head coach to have been awarded the Jack Adams Award with the Blackhawks by winning it in the 1982–83 season. Tommy Gorman, Tommy Ivan, and Rudy Pilous are the only Blackhawks head coaches to have been elected to the Hockey Hall of Fame as a builder. Gorman, Bill Stewart, Pilous, and Joel Quenneville are the only coaches to have won a Stanley Cup championship as the head coach of the Hawks.

Billy Reay, the Blackhawks' head coach for 14 seasons, is the franchise's all-time leader for the most regular-season and playoff games coached and wins, with 1012 regular-season games coached, 516 regular-season game wins, 117 playoff games coached, and 57 playoff game wins. Twenty-three head coaches spent their entire NHL head coaching careers with the Blackhawks. Darryl Sutter and Brian Sutter are the only pair of brothers to have coached the Blackhawks; both coached the Hawks for three seasons each.

Joel Quenneville was the head coach of the Blackhawks from the 2008–09 season to early in the 2018–19 season. and guided the Blackhawks to three Stanley Cup titles in 2010, 2013 and 2015. At the time of his firing, Quenneville was the second-winningest coach both in the Blackhawks and NHL history, and was also second in all-time games coached.

The current coach of the Blackhawks is Jeff Blashill, who was named head coach on May 22, 2025.

== Key ==
#	Number of coaches (Note: A running total of the number of coaches of the Blackhawks; thus, any coach who has two or more separate terms as head coach is only counted once.)
GC	Games coached
W	Wins = Two points
L	Losses = No points
T	Ties = One point
OT	Overtime/shootout losses = One point (Note: Before the 2005–06 season, the NHL instituted a penalty shootout for regular season games that remained tied after a five-minute overtime period, which prevented ties.)
PTS	Points
Win%	Winning percentage (Note: In ice hockey, the winning percentage is calculated by dividing points by maximum possible points.)
Ref	Reference
*	Spent entire NHL head coaching career with the Blackhawks
†	Elected to the Hockey Hall of Fame as a builder
‡	Spent entire NHL head coaching career with the Blackhawks and have been elected to the Hockey Hall of Fame as a builder

== Coaches ==
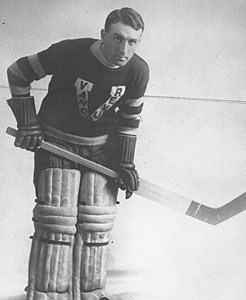
Hughie Lehman won three out of the 21 games he coached.

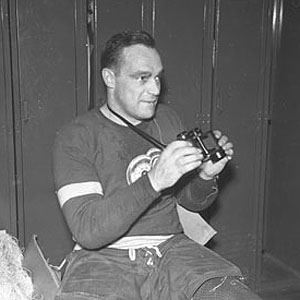
Charlie Conacher coached the Blackhawks for three seasons.

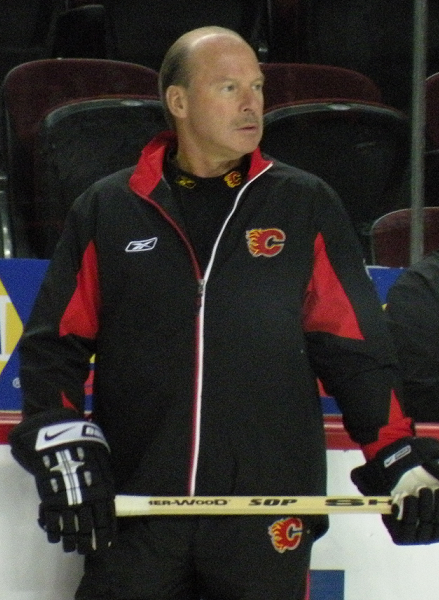
Mike Keenan was the Blackhawks head coach for four seasons.

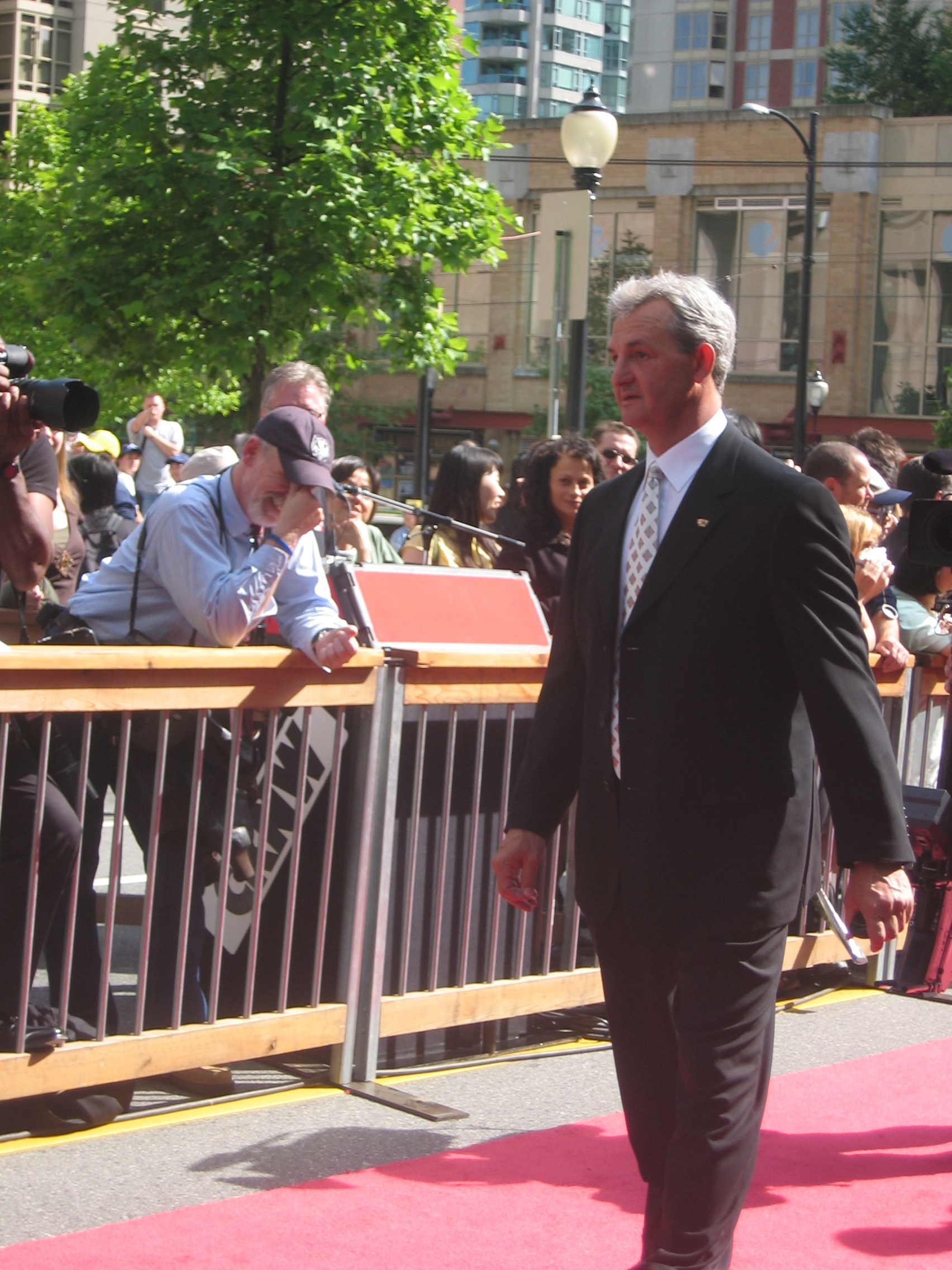
Darryl Sutter coached the Blackhawks for three seasons.

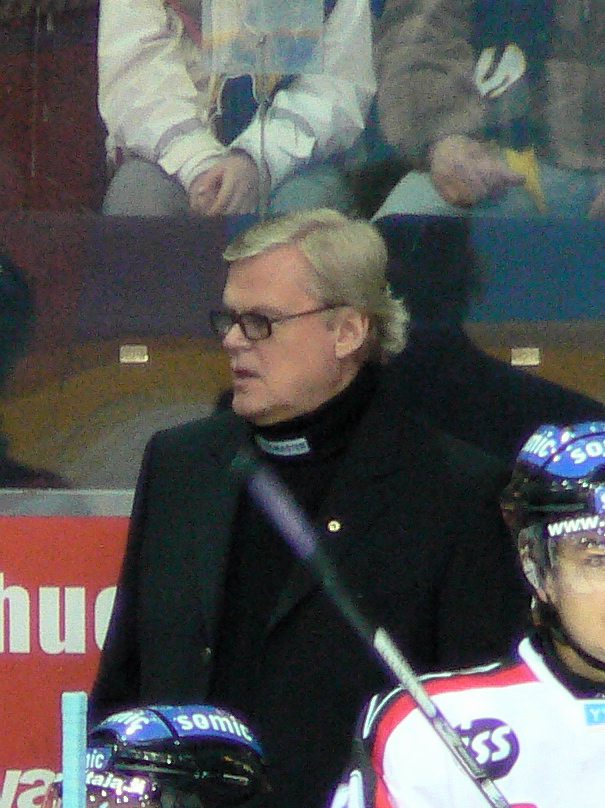
Alpo Suhonen was the Blackhawks head coach in the 2000–01 season.

#	Name	Term (Note: Each year is linked to an article about that particular NHL season.)	Regular season						Playoffs					Achievements	Ref
#	Name	Term	GC	W	L	T/OT	PTS	Win%	GC	W	L	T	Win%	Achievements	Ref
1	Pete Muldoon*	1926–1927	44	19	22	3	41	.466	2	0	1	1	.250		
2	Barney Stanley*	1927–1928	23	4	17	2	10	.217	—	—	—	—	—		
3	Hughie Lehman*	1928	21	3	17	1	7	.167	—	—	—	—	—		
4	Herb Gardiner*	1928–1929	32	5	23	4	14	.219	—	—	—	—	—		
5	Dick Irvin	1929	12	2	6	4	8	.333	—	—	—	—	—		
6	Tom Shaughnessy*	1929–1930	21	10	8	3	23	.548	—	—	—	—	—		
7	Bill Tobin*	1930	23	11	10	2	24	.522	2	0	1	1	.250		
—	Dick Irvin	1930–1931	44	24	17	3	51	.580	9	5	3	1	.611		
—	Bill Tobin*	1931–1932	48	18	19	11	47	.490	2	1	1	0	.500		
8	Emil Iverson*	1932–1933	21	8	7	6	22	.524	—	—	—	—	—		
9	Godfrey Matheson*	1933	2	0	2	0	0	.000	—	—	—	—	—		
10	Tommy Gorman†	1933–1934	73	28	28	17	73	.500	8	6	1	1	.813	1933–34 Stanley Cup championship	
11	Clem Loughlin*	1934–1937	144	61	63	20	142	.493	4	1	2	1	.375		
12	Bill Stewart*	1937–1939	69	22	35	12	56	.406	10	7	3	—	.700	1937–38 Stanley Cup championship	
13	Paul Thompson*	1939–1944	272	104	127	41	249	.458	19	7	12	—	.368		
14	Johnny Gottselig*	1944–1947	187	62	105	20	144	.385	4	0	4	—	.000		
15	Charlie Conacher*	1948–1950	162	56	84	22	134	.414	—	—	—	—	—		
16	Ebbie Goodfellow*	1950–1952	140	30	91	19	79	.282	—	—	—	—	—		
17	Sid Abel	1952–1954	140	39	79	22	100	.357	7	3	4	—	.429		
18	Frank Eddolls*	1954–1955	70	13	40	17	43	.307	—	—	—	—	—		
—	Dick Irvin	1955–1956	70	19	39	12	50	.357	—	—	—	—	—		
19	Tommy Ivan†	1956–1957	103	26	56	21	73	.354	—	—	—	—	—		
20	Rudy Pilous‡	1957–1963	387	162	151	74	398	.514	40	18	22	—	.450	1960–61 Stanley Cup championship	
21	Billy Reay	1963–1976	1,012	516	335	161	1,193	.589	117	57	60	—	.487		
22	Bill White*	1976–1977	46	16	24	6	38	.413	2	0	2	—	.000		
23	Bob Pulford	1977–1979	160	61	65	34	156	.488	4	0	8	—	.000		
24	Eddie Johnston	1979–1980	80	34	27	19	87	.544	7	3	4	—	.429		
25	Keith Magnuson*	1980–1982	132	49	57	26	124	.470	3	0	3	—	.000		
—	Bob Pulford	1982	28	12	14	2	26	.464	15	8	7	—	.533		
26	Orval Tessier*	1982–1985	213	99	93	21	219	.514	18	9	9	—	.500	1982–83 Jack Adams Award winner	
—	Bob Pulford	1985–1987	187	84	77	26	194	.519	22	9	13	—	.409		
27	Bob Murdoch	1987–1988	80	30	41	9	69	.431	5	1	4	—	.200		
28	Mike Keenan	1988–1992	320	153	126	41	347	.542	60	33	27	—	.550		
29	Darryl Sutter	1992–1995	216	110	80	26	246	.569	26	11	15	—	.423		
30	Craig Hartsburg	1995–1998	246	104	102	40	248	.504	16	8	8	—	.500		
31	Dirk Graham*	1998–1999	59	16	35	8	40	.339	—	—	—	—	—		
32	Lorne Molleken*	1999–1999	47	18	19	10	46	.489	—	—	—	—	—		
—	Bob Pulford	1999–2000	58	28	24	6	62	.534	—	—	—	—	—		
33	Alpo Suhonen*	2000–2001	82	29	41	12	70	.427	—	—	—	—	—		
34	Brian Sutter	2001–2004	246	91	103	52	234	.476	5	1	4	—	.200		
35	Trent Yawney*	2005–2006	103	33	55	15	81	.393	—	—	—	—	—		
36	Denis Savard*	2006–2008	147	65	66	16	146	.497	—	—	—	—	—		
37	Joel Quenneville	2008–2018	797	452	249	96	1,000	.627	128	76	52	—	.594	3 Stanley Cup championships (2009–10, 2012–13, 2014–15)	
38	Jeremy Colliton*	2018–2021	205	87	92	26	200	.488	9	4	5	—	.444		
39	Derek King*	2021–2022	70	27	33	10	64	.457	—	—	—	—	—		
40	Luke Richardson*	2022–2024	190	57	118	15	129	.339	—	—	—	—	—		
41	Anders Sorensen*	2024–2025	56	17	30	9	43	.384	—	—	—	—	—		
42	Jeff Blashill	2025–present	82	29	39	14	72	.439	—	—	—	—	—		
