= Bob Pulford =

Canadian ice hockey player and coach (1936–2026)

- Hockey Hall of Fame, 1991
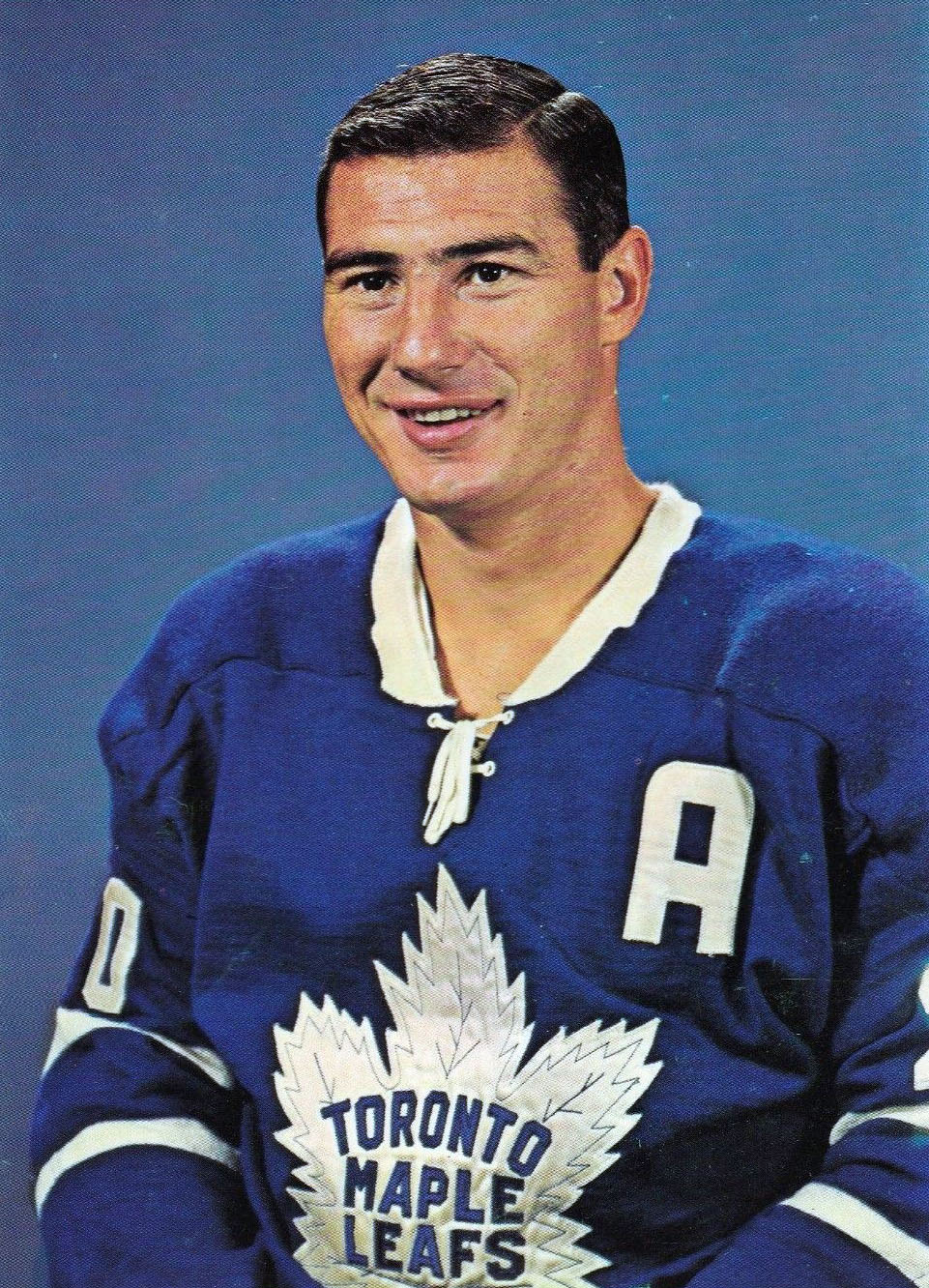
- Pulford with the Toronto Maple Leafs, c. 1963
- Born: March 31, 1936 Newton Robinson, Ontario, Canada
- Died: January 5, 2026 (aged 89) West Palm Beach, Florida, U.S.
- Height: 5 ft 11 in (180 cm)
- Weight: 188 lb (85 kg; 13 st 6 lb)
- Position: Left wing
- Shot: Left
- Played for: Toronto Maple Leafs; Los Angeles Kings
- Playing career: 1956–1972

Robert Jesse Pulford (March 31, 1936 – January 5, 2026) was a Canadian professional ice hockey forward who played for the Toronto Maple Leafs and Los Angeles Kings in the National Hockey League (NHL). He later served as head coach of the Kings before spending 30 years with the Chicago Blackhawks as a coach and general manager.

== Early life ==
Pulford was born in Newton Robinson, Ontario, on March 31, 1936. In his youth, he played in the Weston, Ontario Minor Hockey League, and then played for other minor league teams that were part of the Toronto Maple Leafs farm system.

== Playing career ==
Pulford played junior hockey for the Toronto Marlboros for three seasons from 1953 to 1956, winning two Memorial Cups under coach Turk Broda. He moved up to the Maple Leafs for the 1956–57 season and remained with the team for 14 seasons wearing jersey number 20. Pulford was an important member of the Leaf teams that won four Stanley Cups in 1962–1964 and 1967. When the National Hockey League Players' Association was formed, Pulford became the organization's first president in the spring of 1967.

With the series tied 1-1, and the third game tied at 2-2, Pulford scored the overtime game-winner in game three of the 1967 Stanley Cup Final against the Montreal Canadiens. The Montreal goalie was Rogie Vachon. Pulford later coached Vachon in Los Angeles as the Kings rose to prominence in the mid-1970s.

The Leafs traded him to the Los Angeles Kings on September 3, 1970, where he played two seasons and retired as a player in 1972.

== Coaching career ==
Immediately after retiring as a player, Pulford became head coach of the Kings for the 1972–73 season and led the team for five years before becoming coach and general manager of the Chicago Blackhawks in 1977. As coach of the Kings, he helped Los Angeles go from being one of the worst defensive and penalty-killing teams in the NHL to one of the best. He guided the Kings to their first playoff appearance in five years in 1974 and won the Jack Adams Award as coach of the year in the NHL in 1975. That season, the Kings amassed 105 points, still a club record through 2013. He also led the Kings to their first playoff series wins since 1969 when they defeated the Atlanta Flames in the first round of both the 1976 and 1977 NHL playoffs. Pulford left the Kings after the 1976–77 season after constant feuding with then owner Jack Kent Cooke. Pulford wanted to become general manager as well as coach, or at least have a bigger role in player personnel decisions. Cooke however, often meddled in player personnel matters, and in the mid-1970s, reverted to his old habits of trading promising young players and draft picks for veterans, past their prime former stars.

Pulford served as coach for the Blackhawks on three separate occasions from 1977 to 1987. He was promoted to senior vice president in 1990, but took on the general manager's duties again from 1992 to 1997, from 1999 to 2000, and from 2003 to 2005. During his third stint as general manager, Pulford nominally doubled as head coach, demoting Lorne Molleken to an assistant. However, Molleken remained the team's main operator on the bench, with Pulford as more or less a senior consultant.

In seven seasons and 426 games as Hawks coach over three stints, Pulford won 182, lost 176, and tied 68. At the time he left the bench for good, only Billy Reay had won more regular season games for the Hawks. Pulford is now third, behind Reay and Joel Quenneville for most regular season games won as Hawk coach.

He won the Jack Adams Award for the best coach in the NHL in 1975. As well, he was named head coach of Team USA during the 1976 Canada Cup tournament.

Pulford was inducted into the Hockey Hall of Fame in 1991.

On October 11, 2007, Pulford was named an officer with the Wirtz Corporation, parent company of the Blackhawks, and was no longer part of the day-to-day management of the Blackhawks.

In 2012, Pulford was honoured by the Kings in a pregame ceremony; the team wore their purple and gold 1970s throwback uniforms in the game following this ceremony.

== Personal life and death ==
Pulford died on January 5, 2026, at the age of 89. His son-in-law was Dean Lombardi, who was the former president and general manager of the Los Angeles Kings when they won their first Stanley Cups in 2012 and 2014.

== Career statistics ==
			Regular season					Playoffs
Season	Team	League	GP	G	A	Pts	PIM	GP	G	A	Pts	PIM
1953–54	Weston Dukes	MetJHL	—	—	—	—	—	—	—	—	—	—
1953–54	Toronto Marlboros	OHA-Jr.	17	5	9	14	12	15	4	7	11	12
1954–55	Toronto Marlboros	OHA-Jr.	47	24	22	46	43	13	7	10	17	29
1954–55	Toronto Marlboros	M-Cup	—	—	—	—	—	11	5	4	9	15
1955–56	Toronto Marlboros	OHA-Jr.	48	30	25	55	87	11	16	8	24	2
1955–56	Toronto Marlboros	M-Cup	—	—	—	—	—	13	13	8	21	16
1956–57	Toronto Maple Leafs	NHL	65	11	11	22	32	—	—	—	—	—
1957–58	Toronto Maple Leafs	NHL	70	14	17	31	48	—	—	—	—	—
1958–59	Toronto Maple Leafs	NHL	70	23	14	37	53	12	4	4	8	8
1959–60	Toronto Maple Leafs	NHL	70	24	28	52	81	10	4	1	5	10
1960–61	Toronto Maple Leafs	NHL	40	11	18	29	41	5	0	0	0	8
1961–62	Toronto Maple Leafs	NHL	70	18	21	39	98	12	7	1	8	24
1962–63	Toronto Maple Leafs	NHL	70	19	25	44	49	10	2	5	7	14
1963–64	Toronto Maple Leafs	NHL	70	18	30	48	73	14	5	3	8	20
1964–65	Toronto Maple Leafs	NHL	65	19	29	39	46	6	1	1	2	16
1965–66	Toronto Maple Leafs	NHL	70	28	28	56	51	4	1	1	2	12
1966–67	Toronto Maple Leafs	NHL	67	17	28	45	28	12	1	10	11	12
1967–68	Toronto Maple Leafs	NHL	74	20	30	50	40	—	—	—	—	—
1968–69	Toronto Maple Leafs	NHL	71	11	23	34	20	4	0	0	0	2
1969–70	Toronto Maple Leafs	NHL	74	18	19	37	31	—	—	—	—	—
1970–71	Los Angeles Kings	NHL	59	17	26	43	53	—	—	—	—	—
1971–72	Los Angeles Kings	NHL	73	13	24	37	48	—	—	—	—	—
NHL totals			1,079	281	362	643	792	89	25	26	51	126

== Coaching record ==
Team	Year	Regular season						Postseason			
Team	Year	G	W	L	T	Pts	Finish	W	L	Win %	Result
LA	1972–73	78	31	36	11	73	6th in West	—	—	—	Missed playoffs
LA	1973–74	78	33	33	12	78	3rd in West	1	4	.200	Lost in Quarterfinals (CHI)
LA	1974–75	80	42	17	21	105	2nd in Norris	1	2	.333	Lost in preliminary round (TOR)
LA	1975–76	80	38	33	9	85	2nd in Norris	5	4	.556	Lost in Quarterfinals (BOS)
LA	1976–77	80	34	31	15	83	2nd in Norris	4	5	.444	Lost in Quarterfinals (BOS)
LA total		396	178	150	68	424		11	15	.423	4 playoff appearances
CHI	1977–78	80	32	29	19	83	1st in Smythe	0	4	.000	Lost in Quarterfinals (BOS)
CHI	1978–79	80	29	36	15	73	1st in Smythe	0	4	.000	Lost in Quarterfinals (NYI)
CHI	1981–82	28	12	14	2	72	4th in Norris	8	7	.533	Lost in Conference Final (VAN)
CHI	1984–85	27	16	7	4	83	2nd in Norris	9	6	.600	Lost in Conference Final (EDM)
CHI	1985–86	80	39	33	8	86	1st in Norris	0	3	.000	Lost in Division semifinals (TOR)
CHI	1986–87	80	29	37	14	72	3rd in Norris	0	4	.000	Lost in Division semifinals (DET)
CHI	1999–2000	58	28	24	6	62	3rd in Central	—	—	—	Missed playoffs
CHI total		433	185	180	68	438		17	28	.378	6 playoff appearances
Total		829	363	330	136	862		28	43	.394	10 playoff appearances

== See also ==
- List of NHL players with 1,000 games played

Sporting positions
Preceded by Ted Lindsay (1958)	NHLPA President; 1967–72	Succeeded by Ken Dryden
Preceded by Larry Cahan	Los Angeles Kings captain 1971–73	Succeeded by Terry Harper
Preceded by Fred Glover	Head coach of the Los Angeles Kings; 1972–77	Succeeded by Ron Stewart
Preceded by Bill White; Keith Magnuson; Orval Tessier; Lorne Molleken	Head coach of the Chicago Black Hawks/Blackhawks; 1977–79; 1981–82; 1984–87; 1999–2000	Succeeded by Eddie Johnston; Orval Tessier; Bob Murdoch; Alpo Suhonen
Preceded by Tommy Ivan; Mike Keenan; Bob Murray; Mike Smith	General manager of the Chicago Black Hawks/Blackhawks; 1977–90; 1992–97; 1999–2000; 2003–05	Succeeded by Mike Keenan; Bob Murray; Mike Smith; Dale Tallon
