= Frederic McLaughlin =

American businessman and soldier (1877–1944)

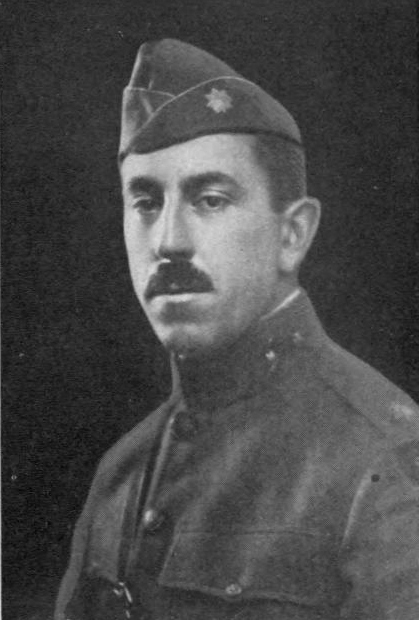
- Maj. McLaughlin during World War I
- Born: 28 June 1877; Chicago, Illinois, U.S.
- Died: 17 December 1944 (aged 67); Lake Forest, Illinois, U.S.
- Burial place: Calvary Cemetery
- Military career
- Allegiance: United States of America
- Branch: United States Army
- Rank: Major
- Units: 333rd Machine Gun Battalion, 86th Infantry Division

Frederic McLaughlin (27 June 1877 – 17 December 1944) was an American businessman and soldier. He was the first owner of the Chicago Black Hawks National Hockey League (NHL) ice hockey team.

Born in Chicago, Illinois, McLaughlin inherited the successful "McLaughlin's Manor House" coffee business from his father, who died in 1905. McLaughlin was a graduate of Harvard University and served in the United States Army during World War I. McLaughlin achieved the rank of Major and was often referred to as Major McLaughlin for the rest of his life.

== Chicago Black Hawks ==
In May 1926, the NHL had granted an expansion franchise to former football star Huntington Hardwick and his syndicate of investors. On 1 June, McLaughlin, who had no experience in the ice hockey business, purchased the Chicago expansion franchise from Hardwick. He named the team the Black Hawks after the nickname of his army unit, the 86th Infantry "Blackhawk" Division, where he had served in the 333rd Machine Gun Battalion. Most of the Hawks players were from the Portland Rosebuds of the Western Hockey League purchased from WHL owner Frank Patrick for $100,000. During his 18 years as owner, McLaughlin would lead the franchise to two Stanley Cup wins, in 1934 and 1938.

At the time McLaughlin acquired the Black Hawks, he was married to Irene Castle, a famous dancer and film actress. She is credited with creating the "Indian head" design of the first Black Hawks sweater. McLaughlin was a "hands on" owner and he made 13 coaching changes in 18 years. One Hawk coach was Godfrey Matheson, who got the job when he met McLaughlin on the train and impressed McLaughlin with his hockey knowledge. Matheson lost the job after two games.

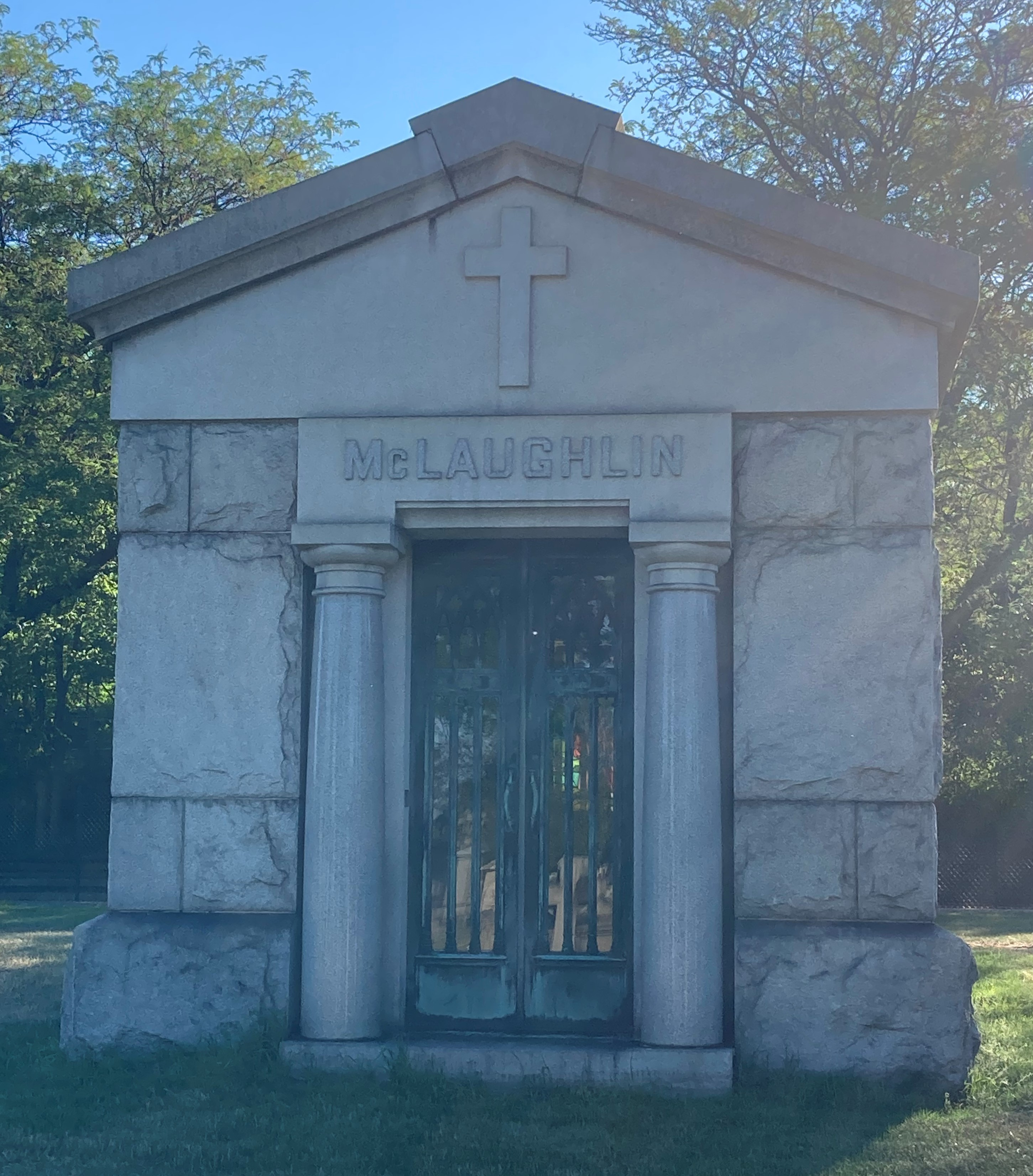
McLaughlin mausoleum at Calvary Cemetery, Evanston

McLaughlin was fiercely patriotic, and at various times during his ownership would try to fill his roster with as many Americans as possible, during a time when very few American-born players played in the NHL. Yet, the 1938 Stanley Cup victory came with eight Americans on the roster, coached by Bostonian Bill Stewart. But despite that big win, Stewart was fired early the next season.

As an owner, McLaughlin also feuded with other owners. James Norris, the Detroit owner, set up a competing Chicago team in the American Association, locking the Hawks out of the Chicago Stadium. The Norris family would eventually purchase the Hawks after McLaughlin's death. Conn Smythe, manager of Toronto supplies the following quote on McLaughlin:

Where hockey was concerned, Major McLaughlin was the strangest bird and, yes, perhaps the biggest nut I met in my entire life.

In 1963, he was inducted into the Hockey Hall of Fame as a builder.

On October 28, 2018, the Blackhawks did a giveaway featuring a soccer jersey inspired by the team's early branding, and Manor House Coffee was seen on the jersey where sponsors are normally put on soccer jerseys.

In 2024, amid the Chicago Blackhawks name and logo controversy, Frederic's granddaughter Castle McLaughlin firmly argues the NHL and Wirtz family should do away with the racist Blackhawks name and logo, following the example of the Washington Redskins. The Athletic journalist Scott Powers wrote that "McLaughlin and her family are far removed from their ownership of the Blackhawks, but she's squarely opposed to the logo."

== Personal life ==
In 1923, McLaughlin married famed dancer Irene Castle, who at age 29 was 16 years younger than him, but had already been widowed and divorced. They were together until his death in 1944.

McLaughlin died of heart disease in Lake Forest at age 67. He was interred at Calvary Cemetery in Evanston.

== Works ==
- Faber, Brandon; Kempenaar, Adam; Rogowin, Adam; Sandberg, John; Tillotson, Rob, eds. (2013). 2013-14 Chicago Blackhawks Media Guide (PDF). p. 274. Archived from the original (PDF) on 5 March 2016.
- Goyens, Chrys; Orr, Frank; Turowetz, Allan; Duguay, Jean-Luc (2000). Blades on ice : a century of professional hockey. TPE Publishing. ISBN 0968622003.
- Jenish, D'Arcy (2013). The NHL: 100 Years of On-Ice Action and Boardroom Battles. Random House LLC. ISBN 9780385671477.
- McFarlane, Brian (2000). The Blackhawks. Toronto, Ontario: Stoddart Publishing. ISBN 0773732527.
- Skog, Jason (2008). The Story of the Chicago Blackhawks. The Creative Company. ISBN 9781583416150.
- Wong, John Chi-Kit (2005). Lords of the Rinks: The Emergence of the National Hockey League, 1875–1936. University of Toronto Press.

Preceded by created	General Manager of the Chicago Black Hawks; 1926-42	Succeeded by Bill Tobin
