= Tommy Ivan =

Canadian ice hockey coach

- Hockey Hall of Fame, 1974 (Builder)
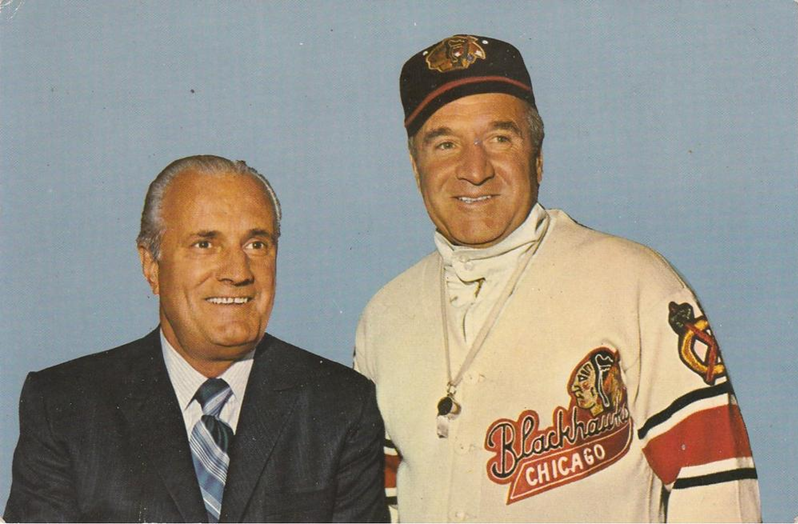
- Ivan (left) with Billy Reay, c. 1970
- Born: January 31, 1911 Toronto, Ontario, Canada
- Died: June 25, 1999 (aged 88) Chicago, Illinois, United States
- Coached for: Detroit Red Wings; Chicago Blackhawks

Thomas Nathaniel Ivan (January 31, 1911 – June 25, 1999) was a Canadian ice hockey coach and general manager. He served as a National Hockey League (NHL) head coach for the Detroit Red Wings from 1947 to 1954 where he won the Stanley Cup three times, and was the general manager for the Chicago Black Hawks from 1954 to 1977, winning a Stanley Cup in 1961. He produced an overall record of 288–174–111.

== Career ==
Ivan was born in Toronto, Ontario, Canada, to Macedonian immigrant parents. He never played professional hockey, as a severe facial injury shortened his career while playing in the Canadian Amateur Hockey Association. His junior hockey days in Ontario, on up to his first pro coaching job with the Omaha Knights in the Central Hockey League, were the first steps in a distinguished Hall of Fame career. Ivan was a keen judge of talent that helped discover young prospects like Gordie Howe and several other National Hockey League players that would go on to Hall of Fame careers.

Ivan is one of eleven coaches to have won the Stanley Cup three times as a coach, and he did so on the strength of seven playoff appearances (second least among those coaches, with only Pete Green doing it better). He took the reins as Black Hawks coach-general manager in 1954, after winning six straight regular-season championships with Detroit. At the time the Hawks were a franchise in trouble. Ivan led a rebuilding effort, adding farm teams and stocking the Hawks' farm system with good prospects. He also made key trades that would help fortify the Hawks into a contending team for the next several seasons. Rudy Pilous was hired to coach the Hawks by Tommy Ivan and he would eventually guide the team to the 1961 Stanley Cup. The 1961 Hawks team produced the results that Ivan's rebuilding process began back in 1954. The Black Hawks also reached the Stanley Cup Final in 1962, 1965, 1971, and 1973. Ivan served 25 years as Black Hawks GM and then served as the Black Hawks' vice-president and alternate governor (NHL Board of Governors) in the years following his GM tenure.

== Death ==
He died of complications of a kidney ailment in 1999.

== Honours ==
- Ivan was inducted into the Hockey Hall of Fame in 1974.
- Starting with the 1974–75 season, the Tommy Ivan Trophy was awarded annually by the Central Hockey League to its Most Valuable Player.
- Ivan received the Lester Patrick Trophy in 1975 for "outstanding service to hockey in the United States."
- Ivan served as chairman of the United States Hockey Hall of Fame, and on the selection committee of the Hockey Hall of Fame.
- Ivan played a key role as chairman of the organizing committee for the 1979–80 Olympic Hockey Festival, helping bring more than 90 players together for Coach Herb Brooks and his staff to pick from. Eventually that team became the 1980 US men's ice hockey team ("Miracle on Ice") that won the Gold Medal at the 1980 Winter Olympics in Lake Placid, New York.
- Ivan is listed in Stan Fischler's book Hockey's 100 as one of the ten best coaches and ten best general managers in the history of the NHL.

== Coaching record ==
Season	Team	Regular season						Postseason			
Season	Team	G	W	L	T	Pts	Finish	W	L	Win %	Result
DET	1947–48	60	30	18	12	72	2nd in NHL	4	6	.400	Lost in Stanley Cup Final (TOR)
DET	1948–49	60	34	19	7	75	1st in NHL	4	7	.364	Lost in Stanley Cup Final (TOR)
DET	1949–50	70	37	19	14	88	1st in NHL	8	6	.571	Won Stanley Cup (NYR)
DET	1950–51	70	44	13	13	101	1st in NHL	2	4	.333	Lost in first round (MTL)
DET	1951–52	70	44	14	12	100	1st in NHL	8	0	1.000	Won Stanley Cup (MTL)
DET	1952–53	70	36	16	18	90	1st in NHL	2	4	.333	Lost in first round (BOS)
DET	1953–54	70	37	19	14	88	1st in NHL	8	4	.667	Won Stanley Cup (MTL)
CHI	1956–57	70	16	39	15	47	6th in NHL	—	—	—	Missed playoffs
CHI	1957–58	33	10	17	6	26	(resigned)	—	—	—	—
Total		573	288	174	111	687		36	31	.537	7 playoff appearances 3 Stanley Cup titles

Preceded by Jack Adams	Head coach of the Detroit Red Wings; 1947–54	Succeeded by Jimmy Skinner
Preceded by Bill Tobin	General manager of the Chicago Black Hawks; 1954–77	Succeeded by Bob Pulford
Preceded by Dick Irvin	Head coach of the Chicago Black Hawks; 1956–57	Succeeded by Rudy Pilous
