= List of Chicago Blackhawks general managers =

The Chicago Blackhawks are an American professional ice hockey team based in Chicago, Illinois. They play in the Central Division of the Western Conference in the National Hockey League (NHL). The team was first named the "Chicago Black Hawks", until 1986, when spelling found in the original franchise documents spelled the franchise name as the "Chicago Blackhawks", making the team change its name in response. The team is also referred to as the "Hawks". The Blackhawks began their NHL play in the 1926–27 season as an expansion team with the Detroit Cougars and the New York Rangers, and is one of the Original Six teams. The franchise has 6 Stanley Cup championships, most recently winning in the 2014–15 season. Having played in the Chicago Coliseum (1926–1929) and the Chicago Stadium (1929–1994), the Blackhawks have played their home games at the United Center since 1994. The team has had ten general managers since their inception.

For much of the early history of the Chicago Black Hawks, the title of "general manager" did not exist. Much of the work of managing the team operations, player contracts and the like was done by owner Frederic McLaughlin, with Bill Tobin as his assistant. Tobin joined the team in 1926 after a brief playing career as a goaltender. He has been variously named as a ticket taker, stick boy and first general manager by appointment by McLaughlin from that time. Tobin held several titles during his term with the Black Hawks. He coached for two years in the 1930s. On the 1934 Stanley Cup win, Tobin is listed as secretary-treasurer. In 1938, Tobin was named president of the team, and for all practical purposes was general manager from that time forward, although McLaughlin stated at the time that it was a change in title only. After McLaughlin died, Tobin was part-owner and president of the team. The actual title of general manager was created in 1952, and Bill Tobin held the title in addition to the title of vice-president. Even when Tommy Ivan was hired in 1954, his title was manager of hockey operations, including the farm team.

== Key ==
Key of terms and definitions
Term	Definition
No.	Number of general managers^{[a]}
Ref(s)	References
–	Does not apply
†	Elected to the Hockey Hall of Fame in the Builder category

== General managers ==
General managers of the Chicago Blackhawks
No.	Name	Tenure	Accomplishments during this term	Ref(s)
1	Frederic McLaughlin†	September 25, 1926 – 1942	Won Stanley Cup 2 times in 3 finals appearances (1931, 1934, 1938); 11 playoff appearances	
2	Bill Tobin	1942 – July 7, 1954	1 Stanley Cup Final appearance (1944); 3 playoff appearances	
3	Tommy Ivan†	July 7, 1954 – July 6, 1977	Won Stanley Cup 1 time in 5 finals appearances (1961, 1962, 1965, 1971, 1973); 5 division titles and 18 playoff appearances	
4	Bob Pulford	July 6, 1977 – June 5, 1990	6 division titles and 13 playoff appearances	
5	Mike Keenan	June 5, 1990 – November 6, 1992	Won Presidents' Trophy (1990–91); 1 Stanley Cup Final appearance (1992); 1 conference title, 1 division title, and 2 playoff appearances	
–	Bob Pulford	November 6, 1992 – July 3, 1997	1 division title and 5 playoff appearances	
6	Bob Murray	July 3, 1997 – December 2, 1999	No playoff appearances	
–	Bob Pulford (Interim)	December 2, 1999 – September 22, 2000	No playoff appearances	
7	Mike Smith	September 22, 2000 – October 24, 2003	1 playoff appearance	
–	Bob Pulford	October 24, 2003 – June 21, 2005	No playoff appearances	
8	Dale Tallon	June 21, 2005 – July 14, 2009	1 playoff appearance	
9	Stan Bowman	July 14, 2009 – October 26, 2021	Won Stanley Cup 3 times (2010, 2013, 2015); Won Presidents' Trophy (2012–13); 3 conference titles, 3 division titles, and 8 playoff appearances	
10	Kyle Davidson	October 26, 2021 – present		

== Notes ==
- ^{a} A running total of the number of general managers of the franchise. Thus any general manager who has two or more separate terms as general manager is only counted once.
