= Denis Savard =

Canadian ice hockey player (born 1961)

- Hockey Hall of Fame, 2000
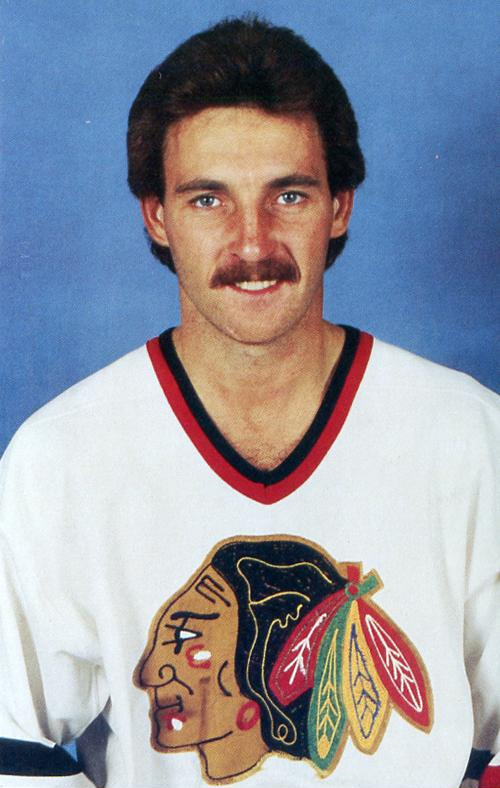
- Savard with the Chicago Blackhawks in 1986
- Born: February 4, 1961 (age 65) Gatineau, Quebec, Canada
- Height: 5 ft 10 in (178 cm)
- Weight: 170 lb (77 kg; 12 st 2 lb)
- Position: Centre
- Shot: Right
- Played for: Chicago Blackhawks; Montreal Canadiens; Tampa Bay Lightning
- NHL draft: 3rd overall, 1980; Chicago Black Hawks
- Playing career: 1980–1997
- Website: http://www.savard18.com

Denis Joseph Savard (born February 4, 1961) is a Canadian former professional ice hockey player who played as a center for 17 seasons in the National Hockey League (NHL) for the Chicago Blackhawks, Montreal Canadiens, and Tampa Bay Lightning.

Savard was drafted by the Chicago Blackhawks in 1980 and quickly became a key component of the team for the decade. He recorded a 20-goal season in each of his first twelve seasons, which included five 100-point seasons. He led the Blackhawks to the Conference Finals four times, losing each time, twice to Wayne Gretzky's Edmonton Oilers. Savard is known for the spin' o rama move, a tactic in hockey used to create distance between the puck carrier and opponent. Savard won one Stanley Cup with the Montreal Canadiens in 1993. Savard also played with the Tampa Bay Lightning for two seasons before returning to the Chicago Blackhawks in 1994, where he retired at the close of the 1996–97 season. He was elected to the Hockey Hall of Fame in 2000. In 2017, Savard was named one of the '100 Greatest NHL Players' in history.

After his playing career ended, he joined the coaching staff of the Blackhawks. In 2006, he was named head coach of the Blackhawks, where he coached three seasons until 2008. He currently serves as an ambassador for the Blackhawks' organization.

== Early life ==
As a youth, Savard played in the 1973 and 1974 Quebec International Pee-Wee Hockey Tournaments with a minor ice hockey team from Verdun, Quebec.

== Playing career ==
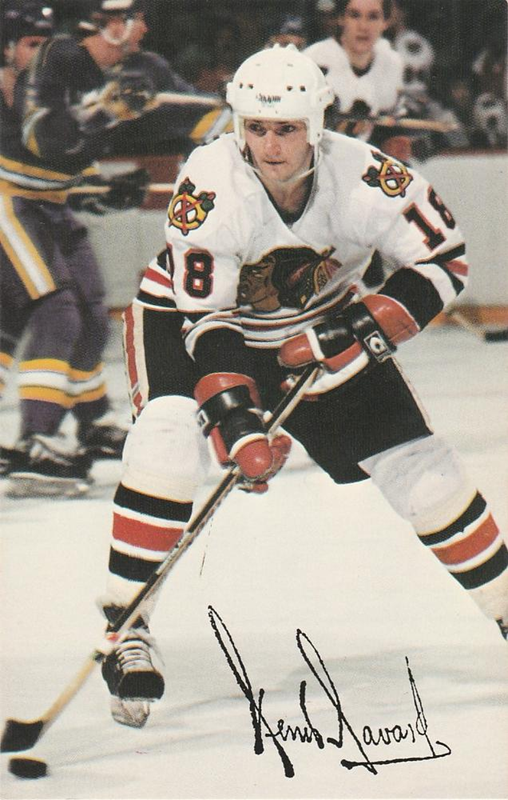
Savard with the Black Hawks in 1981.

For the 1980 NHL entry draft, the Montreal Canadiens held the first overall pick, and many fans hoped the Canadiens would use it to draft Savard. Instead, the Canadiens drafted Doug Wickenheiser and Savard was chosen third overall by the Chicago Blackhawks. He was the highest drafted player in Blackhawks' history, until the organization drafted Patrick Kane with the first overall pick in 2007. He began his career during the 1980–81 NHL season in which he had three assists in his first game. He then went on to set the Blackhawks' record (since broken) for most points by a rookie with 75.

He was known for his trademark move, the 'Savardian Spin-o-rama' (a term actually coined by Danny Gallivan, referencing the move performed by Serge Savard), which entailed Savard whirling around with the puck in a full rotation allowing him to defeat defenders and goaltenders alike.

Savard had two separate stints with the Blackhawks. The first was from the 1980–81 season to the 1989–90 season. The second was from 1994–95 to 1996–97. During his absence from Chicago, he played for the Montreal Canadiens (1990–91 to 1992–93) and the Tampa Bay Lightning (1993–94 to 1994–95).

On June 29, 1990, Savard was infamously traded to the Montreal Canadiens for star defenceman Chris Chelios and a second-round pick (Mike Pomichter), a transaction that has since been considered largely in Chicago's favor as Chelios would produce some of his best seasons as a Blackhawk while Savard's career was on the decline. Savard won the Stanley Cup with the Canadiens in 1993, although Savard was kept out of much of the postseason due to a hairline fracture in his ankle, and was essentially an assistant coach by the clinching game five. After that game, when Canadiens captain Guy Carbonneau took the Cup, he beckoned Savard to join him, then let him hoist the Cup first. This was a break from Stanley Cup tradition; normally the captain hoists the Cup right away after receiving it from the Commissioner. As an alternate captain, Savard would have normally gotten the first lap with the Cup after Carbonneau, since he had waited the longest to play for, let alone win, the Cup.

He signed as a free agent with the Tampa Bay Lightning in the summer of 1993, where he played a season and a half. On April 6, 1995, Savard was traded back to Chicago, for a 1996 sixth-round pick (Xavier Delisle). Savard's NHL career would end where it had started, with the Blackhawks.

In 1,196 NHL games, Savard scored 473 goals and 865 assists, totalling 1338 points. He trails only Bobby Hull, Stan Mikita and Patrick Kane for total points in Chicago Blackhawks history. Five times during his career he scored at least 100 points and for seven straight years he had at least 30 goals. His highest point total of 131 came in 1987–88 and his highest goal total of 47 came in 1985–86. In 169 playoff games, he scored 66 goals and 109 assists for a total of 175 points.

Savard officially retired from professional hockey on June 26, 1997. On March 19, 1998, the Blackhawks retired his jersey number #18. Savard was inducted into the Hockey Hall of Fame on November 13, 2000.

== Awards and achievements ==
- Stanley Cup champion: 1993
- NHL All-Star Game: 1982, 1983, 1984, 1986, 1988, 1989, 1990, 1991, 1996
- NHL Second All-Star Team: 1983

== Legacy ==
When Savard retired, he was 13th all-time in assists with 865 and 17th in points with 1,338. His five 100-point seasons with Chicago still ranks as a franchise record. He was one of three players to record 1,000 points for the Blackhawks, behind only Stan Mikita and Bobby Hull. He averaged 1.12 points per game, which ranks 10th best for players with at least 1,000 games played in NHL history. He recorded 66 goals in the Stanley Cup playoffs, with 61 of them coming with Chicago, which ranks second most in franchise history behind Hull. He is one of nineteen players with 175 points in the playoffs in league history.

On March 19, 1998, the Blackhawks retired his number 18 jersey, the fifth player to receive the honor for Chicago. Savard was inducted into the Hockey Hall of Fame on November 13, 2000.

== Career statistics ==
| | | | Regular season | | | | | Playoffs |
| Season | Team | League | GP | G | A | Pts | PIM | GP | G | A | Pts | PIM |
|---|---|---|---|---|---|---|---|---|---|---|---|---|
| 1977–78 | Montreal Juniors | QMJHL | 72 | 37 | 79 | 116 | 22 | 13 | 3 | 17 | 20 | 0 |
| 1978–79 | Montreal Juniors | QMJHL | 70 | 46 | 112 | 158 | 88 | 11 | 5 | 6 | 11 | 46 |
| 1979–80 | Montreal Juniors | QMJHL | 72 | 63 | 118 | 181 | 93 | 10 | 7 | 16 | 23 | 8 |
| 1980–81 | Chicago Black Hawks | NHL | 76 | 28 | 47 | 75 | 47 | 3 | 0 | 0 | 0 | 0 |
| 1981–82 | Chicago Black Hawks | NHL | 80 | 32 | 87 | 119 | 82 | 15 | 11 | 7 | 18 | 52 |
| 1982–83 | Chicago Black Hawks | NHL | 78 | 35 | 86 | 121 | 99 | 13 | 8 | 9 | 17 | 22 |
| 1983–84 | Chicago Black Hawks | NHL | 75 | 37 | 57 | 94 | 71 | 5 | 1 | 3 | 4 | 9 |
| 1984–85 | Chicago Black Hawks | NHL | 79 | 38 | 67 | 105 | 56 | 15 | 9 | 20 | 29 | 20 |
| 1985–86 | Chicago Black Hawks | NHL | 80 | 47 | 69 | 116 | 111 | 3 | 4 | 1 | 5 | 6 |
| 1986–87 | Chicago Blackhawks | NHL | 70 | 40 | 50 | 90 | 108 | 4 | 1 | 0 | 1 | 12 |
| 1987–88 | Chicago Blackhawks | NHL | 80 | 44 | 87 | 131 | 95 | 5 | 4 | 3 | 7 | 17 |
| 1988–89 | Chicago Blackhawks | NHL | 58 | 23 | 59 | 82 | 110 | 16 | 8 | 11 | 19 | 10 |
| 1989–90 | Chicago Blackhawks | NHL | 60 | 23 | 57 | 80 | 56 | 20 | 7 | 15 | 22 | 41 |
| 1990–91 | Montreal Canadiens | NHL | 70 | 28 | 31 | 59 | 52 | 13 | 2 | 11 | 13 | 35 |
| 1991–92 | Montreal Canadiens | NHL | 77 | 28 | 42 | 70 | 73 | 11 | 3 | 9 | 12 | 8 |
| 1992–93 | Montreal Canadiens | NHL | 63 | 16 | 34 | 50 | 90 | 14 | 0 | 5 | 5 | 4 |
| 1993–94 | Tampa Bay Lightning | NHL | 74 | 18 | 28 | 46 | 106 | — | — | — | — | — |
| 1994–95 | Tampa Bay Lightning | NHL | 31 | 6 | 11 | 17 | 10 | — | — | — | — | — |
| 1994–95 | Chicago Blackhawks | NHL | 12 | 4 | 4 | 8 | 8 | 16 | 7 | 11 | 18 | 10 |
| 1995–96 | Chicago Blackhawks | NHL | 69 | 13 | 35 | 48 | 102 | 10 | 1 | 2 | 3 | 8 |
| 1996–97 | Chicago Blackhawks | NHL | 64 | 9 | 18 | 27 | 60 | 6 | 0 | 2 | 2 | 2 |
| NHL totals | | | 1,196 | 473 | 865 | 1,338 | 1,336 | 169 | 66 | 109 | 175 | 256 |

== Coaching career ==
Shortly after his retirement as a player, Savard began a coaching career with the Blackhawks in December 1997. On November 27, 2006, Savard was named head coach of the Chicago Blackhawks after Trent Yawney was fired mid-season. He was commended for leading a young Blackhawks team to within 3 points of a playoff berth during his second season as coach. The Hawks finished just one victory away from the .500 mark in 2007–2008. The 40 wins in 2007–08 marked the first time the club had reached the 40 win mark in six years.

On October 16, 2008, just four games into the season Savard was fired as coach of the Chicago Blackhawks. He was replaced by former Colorado Avalanche coach Joel Quenneville, who had been hired as a scout for the Blackhawks during the previous summer. In 147 games as coach, Savard posted a 65–66–16 record. Savard remains as an ambassador for the Blackhawks and received Stanley Cup rings in 2010, 2013 and 2015.

=== Coaching record ===
| Team | Year | Regular season | | | | | | Post season |
| Team | Year | G | W | L | OTL | Pts | Division rank | Result |
|---|---|---|---|---|---|---|---|---|
| Chicago Blackhawks | 2006–07 | 61 | 24 | 30 | 7 | 55 | 5th in Central | Missed playoffs |
| Chicago Blackhawks | 2007–08 | 82 | 40 | 34 | 8 | 88 | 3rd in Central | Missed playoffs |
| Chicago Blackhawks | 2008–09 | 4 | 1 | 2 | 1 | 3 | 2nd in Central | Fired |
| NHL totals | | 147 | 65 | 66 | 16 | – | | |

== Personal life ==
Savard has a cousin named Jean Savard who also played for the Chicago Blackhawks in the 1970s. He also shared the same number as Serge Savard, who is unrelated to him. They shared the same number (#18), and in the 1990s Serge was general manager of the Habs when he acquired Denis from the Blackhawks.

Savard is sometimes called "Savoir-Faire" referring to a fictional French Canadian mouse that was the archnemesis of the cartoon character Klondike Kat.

Savard is mentioned in The Bear, a Hulu comedy-drama series set in Chicago. In a flashback from the first-season episode "Ceres", Mikey Berzatto (played by Jon Bernthal) claims to have run into Savard at a party the night after his induction into the Hockey Hall of Fame.

== See also ==
- List of members of the Hockey Hall of Fame
- List of NHL statistical leaders
- List of NHL players with 1000 points

| Preceded by Keith Brown | Chicago Black Hawks first-round draft pick 1980 | Succeeded by Tony Tanti |
| Preceded by Trent Yawney | Head coach of the Chicago Blackhawks; 2006–08 | Succeeded by Joel Quenneville |
| Preceded by Darryl Sutter | Chicago Blackhawks captain 1988–89 | Succeeded by Dirk Graham |
