= Mike Smith (ice hockey, born 1945) =

American ice hockey coach and manager

Michael A. Smith (born 1945 in Potsdam, New York) is an American former college hockey player, professional coach and front office executive who has worked with the original Winnipeg Jets, Chicago Blackhawks and Toronto Maple Leafs of the National Hockey League (NHL). Since 2003, Smith has worked as a scout and with two companies specializing in hockey analytics.

== Beginnings in hockey ==
Smith was born and raised in Potsdam and attended Potsdam Central High School where he was on the hockey team. Smith earned a Bachelor of Science degree in social sciences at Clarkson University, where he also played hockey. He then transferred to Syracuse University where he earned a doctorate in sociology. While in graduate school at Syracuse, he was the head coach for two seasons at Christian Brothers Academy.

== NHL years ==
In 1979, Smith had his first job with the Winnipeg Jets, when he was hired as coach of the Tulsa farm team. He spent fourteen years in the Jets organization, where he became best known as a pioneer in bringing Russian players into the league. He became director of scouting, then assistant general manager after Michael Doran, the then assistant general manager, was injured in an automobile accident in November 1984. In September 1988, the Jets fired John Ferguson, giving the GM job to Smith on an interim basis before making him the permanent General Manager in December. Smith was manager of the Jets from 1988 to 1994.

Smith worked as a scout for the Chicago Blackhawks and assisted the USA Hockey program until August 1997, when Smith was appointed the associate General Manager of the Toronto Maple Leafs. Anders Hedberg was also made Personnel Director. A couple of Smith's noteworthy non-player moves during his time with the Leafs were the hiring of Pat Quinn as head coach and managing assistant Mike Kitchen. Despite the 28 point turnaround and franchise record in wins, Smith's contract wasn't renewed.

In December 1999, the Blackhawks named Smith as the Manager of Hockey Operations. Nine months later he became the club's seventh general manager. Smith had an immediate impact, as the Blackhawks made the playoffs for the first time in five years during the 2001–02 season. He was named "Executive of the Year" by The Sporting News, but still faced pressure from Blackhawks owner Bill Wirtz, who wanted to replace Smith with Bob Pulford. Smith remained the Blackhawks general manager for the next three years. During his tenure in Chicago, Smith drafted Duncan Keith, Brent Seabrook, Dustin Byfuglien and Corey Crawford, who would go on to play integral roles in the Blackhawks' future Stanley Cup victories, while also earning future All-Star honors. He was fired by the Blackhawks in October 2003, and replaced by Pulford, who would claim Smith's termination was attributed to his deteriorating relationship with head coach Brian Sutter.

== Other hockey activities ==
In 1999, Smith was inducted into the New York High School Hockey Hall of Fame. In 2006, Smith joined Coleman Analytics to help that company develop and market an analytics package for NHL teams. In 2015, Smith was hired by Bench Metrics to develop a product to help teams apply analytics for teams to use in the NHL Entry Draft.

== Achievements ==
During his tenure with the Winnipeg Jets, Smith acquired Randy Cunneyworth, Rick Tabaracci and Dave McLlwain from the Pittsburgh Penguins for Randy Gilhen, Andrew McBain and Jim Kyte at the 1989 NHL entry draft. The move helped the Jets rebound to a respectable 37-32-11, a 21-point improvement over the previous season. Smith would also trade Ed Olczyk to the New York Rangers for fan favorites Tie Domi and Kris King on December 28, 1992. The move brought a physical presence, that the Jets desperately needed.

In his first year presiding over the Toronto Maple Leafs, Smith established a franchise record for wins at 45. Many site the omnibus FA signings he made after he was hired during the summer of 1998 which included Steve Thomas, Curtis Joseph, Sylvain Cote, and checking forwards Derek King and Kris King who played an integral support role for the team.

Smith was named Executive of the Year by The Sporting News after the 2001–02 season, while with the Blackhawks. Mike Smith drafted several future NHL stars, such as Brent Seabrook, Duncan Keith, Dustin Byfuglien, Alexei Zhamnov, Nikolai Khabibulin, Keith Tkachuk, Kris Draper, Corey Crawford, James Wisniewski, and Stu Barnes.

== Criticisms ==
When it comes to the NHL entry draft, Smith has been perceived as favoring Russian players over the physical style types often seen in the North American junior systems. Smith made some very questionable draft choices during his final three years as Winnipeg Jets GM, drafting Aaron Ward in 1991, ahead of future stars Peter Forsberg, Brian Rolston, and Alexei Kovalev. Ward, who would go on to become to become a solid journeyman defender who played more than 800 games and became Stanley Cup winner with the Red Wings was traded for one year of Paul Ysebaert. In 1992, he drafted 25-year-old Sergei Bautin, who had an unremarkable NHL career. In 1993, Smith drafted Mats Lindgren, who also made little impact in the NHL.

Smith was largely responsible for forcing Dale Hawerchuk, the Jets franchise player, out of Winnipeg. Years later, Hawerchuk would state "In my era there were two Winnipegs. There was the John Ferguson era, which was positive, upbeat, a really community-driven team. And then the Mike Smith era, which was negative and pessimistic. That ran through the media. I thought I'd be a Winnipeg Jet forever, but at the end Mike pretty much made it impossible for me to really push forward with my career there."

Smith made some questionable trades that would come back to haunt the Jets. During the Summer of 1993, Smith would send future Olympian, and Frank J. Selke Trophy winner Kris Draper to the Detroit Red Wings for $1.00. Smith would also trade NHL All-Star Phil Housley to the St. Louis Blues for Nelson Emerson and Stephane Quintal. On November 25, 1993, Smith would trade star forward Stu Barnes along with a sixth round selection (previously acquired from the St. Louis Blues; Chris Kibermanis) in 1994 to the Florida Panthers for Randy Gilhen.

Mike Smith was mainly responsible for dismantling a young, and promising Winnipeg Jets team. By the time Smith was relieved of his Managing duties in January 1994, the Jets were last in the Western Conference.

== Work with Team USA ==
Smith has been heavily involved with USA Hockey, having served as the coach and general manager for the team's 1981, 1994 and 1995 appearances at the IIHF World Hockey Championship. In addition, he serves on the advisory board to USA Hockey.

== Personal life ==
Smith is widowed after his wife Judith succumbed to cancer in the fall of 2000. The couple had one son, Jason. Smith has authored ten books related to coaching in hockey at the grassroots level and is an avid collector of Native American artwork.

== Coaching record ==
Team	Year	Regular season						Postseason
Team	Year	G	W	L	T	Pts	Finish	Result
Winnipeg Jets	1980–81	23	2	17	4	(32)	6th in Smythe	Missed playoffs

Preceded by John Ferguson, Sr.	General Manager of the Winnipeg Jets; 1988–94	Succeeded by John Paddock
Preceded by Bill Sutherland	Head coach of the Winnipeg Jets; 1981	Succeeded by Tom Watt
Preceded by Bob Pulford	General Manager of the Chicago Blackhawks; 2000–03	Succeeded by Bob Pulford
