= Luke Richardson =

Canadian ice hockey player and coach

Luke Richardson MSC
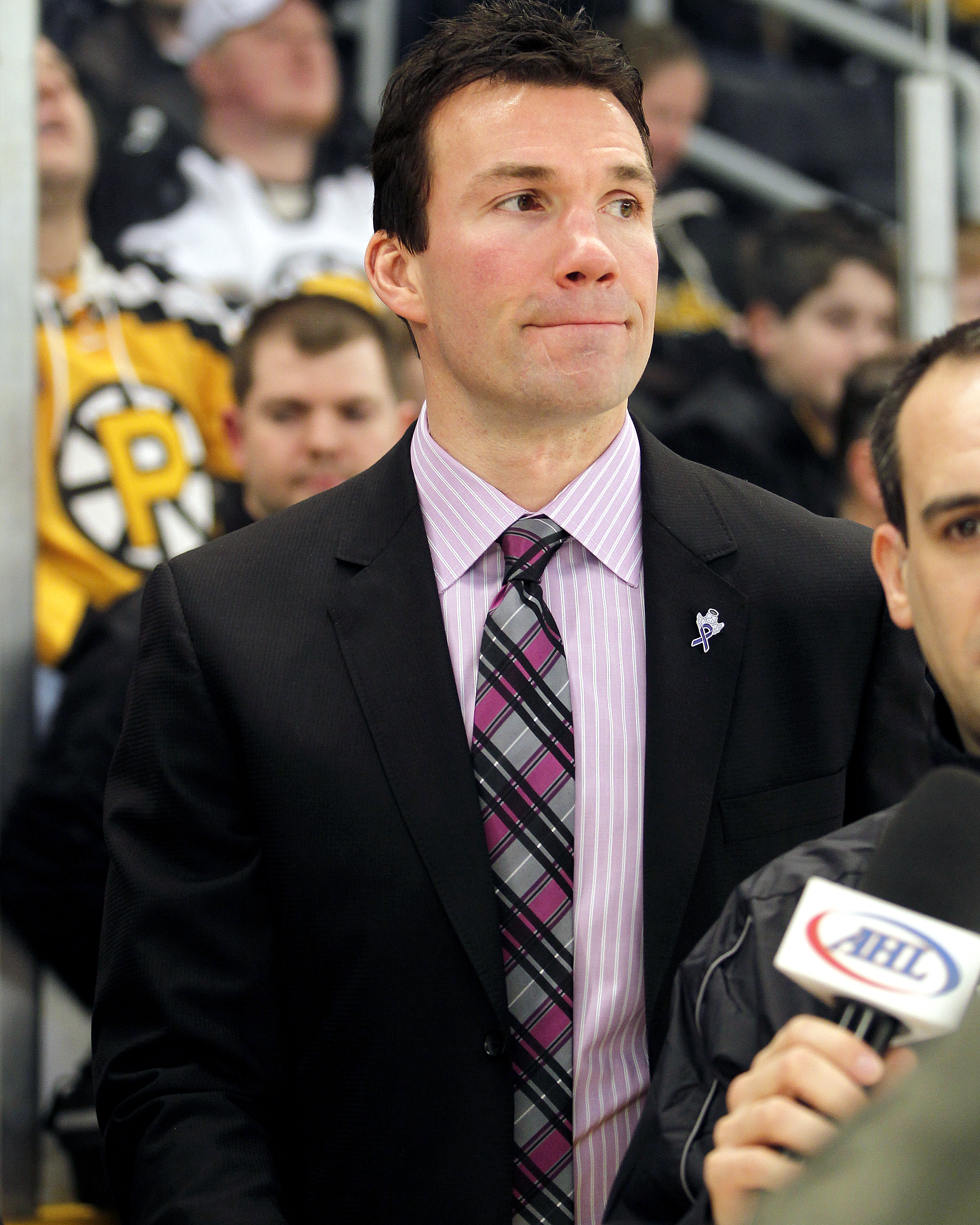
- Richardson at the 2013 AHL All-Star Skills Competition
- Born: March 26, 1969 (age 57) Ottawa, Ontario, Canada
- Height: 6 ft 4 in (193 cm)
- Weight: 216 lb (98 kg; 15 st 6 lb)
- Position: Defence
- Shot: Left
- Played for: Toronto Maple Leafs; Edmonton Oilers; Philadelphia Flyers; Columbus Blue Jackets; Tampa Bay Lightning; Ottawa Senators
- Coached for: Chicago Blackhawks; Nashville Predators
- National team: Canada
- NHL draft: 7th overall, 1987; Toronto Maple Leafs
- Playing career: 1987–2008
- Coaching career: 2009–present
Medal record
Representing Canada
World Championships
| Gold medal – first place | 1994 Italy |
| Silver medal – second place | 1996 Austria |

Luke Glen Richardson MSC (born March 26, 1969) is a Canadian professional ice hockey coach and former player. He serves as an assistant coach for the Nashville Predators of the National Hockey League (NHL). He was selected in the first round, seventh overall, by the Toronto Maple Leafs in the 1987 NHL entry draft. Richardson has also played for the Edmonton Oilers, Philadelphia Flyers, Columbus Blue Jackets, Tampa Bay Lightning, and Ottawa Senators.

== Playing career ==
Richardson was selected seventh overall by the Toronto Maple Leafs in the 1987 NHL entry draft after two successful seasons with the Peterborough Petes of the Ontario Hockey League (OHL). Midway through his rookie NHL season, on January 6, 1988, Richardson was the victim of an infamous attack from Dino Ciccarelli of the Minnesota North Stars, who clubbed him over the head several times with his stick. Ciccarelli was later convicted of assault, serving one day in jail and paying a fine of C$1,000. However, the assault had no discernible effects on the play of Richardson. He remained a regular on the Toronto blue line until 1991 when he was involved in a blockbuster trade, moving to the Edmonton Oilers (along with Vincent Damphousse, Scott Thornton, Peter Ing, future considerations, and cash) in exchange for Grant Fuhr, Glenn Anderson, and Craig Berube.

Though not a great point producer, Richardson developed a reputation as an aggressive, stay-at-home blue liner. He would be consistent in that regard during stops with the Oilers, the Philadelphia Flyers and the Columbus Blue Jackets. It was with the Flyers that Richardson came the closest to a Stanley Cup appearance in 2000, when the Flyers lost 4–3 in the Eastern Conference Finals to the New Jersey Devils.

During the 2005–06 season, his last as captain of the Blue Jackets, Richardson was traded back to Toronto on March 8, 2006. He played in the 2006–07 season after he signed a one-year contract with the Tampa Bay Lightning, playing in 27 games and registering 3 assists and 16 penalty minutes. Richardson was a healthy scratch by the end of the 2006–07 season and playoffs, and became an unrestricted free agent that summer.

On August 7, 2007, Richardson signed a one-year, $500,000 two-way contract with his hometown Ottawa Senators, amid the speculation he would soon announce his retirement from the NHL. On February 15, 2008, Richardson was named the Senators' nominee for the Bill Masterton Memorial Trophy, though the award went to Jason Blake of the Toronto Maple Leafs.

On September 27, 2008, Richardson re-signed with Ottawa to a one-year, two-way contract. During the 2008–09 season and, being used primarily as a reserve defenceman, he announced his retirement as a player on November 27, 2008, having played in just two games that season, with the intention of pursuing a coaching career. He was hired as an assistant coach by the Senators later that season.

== Coaching career ==
=== Ottawa Senators ===
Richardson began his coaching career during the 2009–10 season behind the bench of the Ottawa Senators, as an assistant coach to head coach Cory Clouston. During the two years under Clouston, the Senators struggled to establish themselves as playoff contenders, enduring setbacks caused by injuries, changes from the Senators' usual defensive strategy to an unsuccessful offensive play style, and communication issues between Clouston and the Senators roster. Clouston was fired by general manager Bryan Murray in Richardson's second year. Richardson then served under new head coach Paul MacLean during the 2011–12 season in his last year as an assistant coach with the team. While Richardson was behind the Senators' bench, the Senators posted a 117–103–26 record over three seasons, making the Stanley Cup playoffs twice but never progressing past the first round, losing to the Pittsburgh Penguins in six games, and falling one game short to the New York Rangers.

=== Binghamton Senators ===
After three seasons as an assistant coach in Ottawa, Richardson joined the Binghamton Senators, Ottawa's American Hockey League (AHL) affiliate at the time, as head coach. During his rookie season as head coach, Richardson led an inexperienced Binghamton team to a 44–24–1–7 record, finishing fourth in the AHL's Eastern Conference. He was named coach of the AHL Eastern Conference all-star team in 2012–13 after guiding the Senators to the conference's best record at the all-star break. The Senators' organization subsequently rewarded Richardson with a contract extension through the 2014–15 season.

Richardson signed another one-year contract for 2015–16. In so doing, he turned down an assistant position with Ottawa, seeking to stay as head coach of Binghamton, with an end to pursuing a future NHL head coaching opportunity. At the end of the season, after the Ottawa Senators had fired head coach Dave Cameron, Richardson opted to leave the Senators' organization to pursue other opportunities. Richardson had asked to be considered for the Ottawa head coach position but was turned down by new general manager Pierre Dorion.

=== New York Islanders ===
On May 18, 2017, Richardson was hired by the New York Islanders as an assistant coach.

=== Montreal Canadiens ===
On July 7, 2018, he joined the Montreal Canadiens as an assistant coach to Claude Julien. On June 19, 2021, he temporarily served as head coach in game 3 through the remainder of the Stanley Cup Semifinals against the Vegas Golden Knights when interim head coach Dominique Ducharme entered isolation after testing positive for COVID-19. With Ducharme participating virtually, Richardson led the team to win the series and move forward to the 2021 Stanley Cup Finals.

=== Chicago Blackhawks ===
On June 27, 2022, Richardson was named by the Chicago Blackhawks as their 40th head coach in franchise history. Despite a challenging first two seasons as head coach in which the team went a combined 49–102–13, Richardson was praised for his managerial abilities despite working with a weak roster. On December 5, 2024, the Blackhawks fired Richardson after tallying a league-worst 18 points through the first 26 games of the season.

=== Nashville Predators ===
On June 24, 2025, Richardson was named assistant coach of the Nashville Predators under head coach Andrew Brunette.

=== International ===
On October 7, 2016, Richardson was named assistant coach for Canada at the Deutschland-Cup. In December 2016, he served as head coach of Canada at the Spengler Cup in Davos, Switzerland, leading Canada to its 14th title at the event.

== International play ==
Before Richardson began his NHL career, he played for the Canadian men's national junior team in 1987 and was part of the infamous Punch-up in Piestany brawl.

== Personal life ==
Richardson and his wife Stephanie had two daughters, Daron and Morgan. On November 13, 2010, Daron died by suicide at the family home in Ottawa. Five days later, 5,600 mourners attended a celebration of life ceremony for her at Scotiabank Place in Kanata, Ontario. The Philadelphia Flyers, one of Richardson's former teams, held a moment of silence before their game against the Senators on November 15. On February 2, 2011, the Richardsons, the Royal Ottawa Foundation for Mental Health, the Senators Foundation and the Ottawa Senators announced the creation of a program to inspire conversations about youth mental health. Known as "Do it for Daron", the hope was to honour her memory while raising money to prevent teenage suicide. Luke and Stephanie Richardson were awarded the Meritorious Service Cross for their efforts in April 2017.

During the 2011–12 Canada women's national ice hockey team season, Richardson's daughter Morgan was a member of the Canadian National Under-18 team which played a three-game series against the United States in August 2011.

Richardson is the uncle of Washington Capitals defenceman Jakob Chychrun.

== Awards ==
- Pelle Lindbergh Memorial Trophy – 1999–2000

== Career statistics ==
=== Regular season and playoffs ===
| | | | Regular season | | | | | Playoffs |
| Season | Team | League | GP | G | A | Pts | PIM | GP | G | A | Pts | PIM |
|---|---|---|---|---|---|---|---|---|---|---|---|---|
| 1985–86 | Peterborough Petes | OHL | 63 | 6 | 18 | 24 | 57 | 16 | 2 | 1 | 3 | 50 |
| 1986–87 | Peterborough Petes | OHL | 59 | 13 | 42 | 55 | 70 | 12 | 0 | 5 | 5 | 24 |
| 1987–88 | Toronto Maple Leafs | NHL | 78 | 4 | 6 | 10 | 90 | 2 | 0 | 0 | 0 | 0 |
| 1988–89 | Toronto Maple Leafs | NHL | 55 | 2 | 7 | 9 | 106 | — | — | — | — | — |
| 1989–90 | Toronto Maple Leafs | NHL | 67 | 4 | 14 | 18 | 122 | 5 | 0 | 0 | 0 | 22 |
| 1990–91 | Toronto Maple Leafs | NHL | 78 | 1 | 9 | 10 | 238 | — | — | — | — | — |
| 1991–92 | Edmonton Oilers | NHL | 75 | 2 | 19 | 21 | 118 | 16 | 0 | 5 | 5 | 45 |
| 1992–93 | Edmonton Oilers | NHL | 82 | 3 | 10 | 13 | 142 | — | — | — | — | — |
| 1993–94 | Edmonton Oilers | NHL | 69 | 2 | 6 | 8 | 131 | — | — | — | — | — |
| 1994–95 | Edmonton Oilers | NHL | 46 | 3 | 10 | 13 | 40 | — | — | — | — | — |
| 1995–96 | Edmonton Oilers | NHL | 82 | 2 | 9 | 11 | 108 | — | — | — | — | — |
| 1996–97 | Edmonton Oilers | NHL | 82 | 1 | 11 | 12 | 91 | 12 | 0 | 2 | 2 | 14 |
| 1997–98 | Philadelphia Flyers | NHL | 81 | 2 | 3 | 5 | 139 | 5 | 0 | 0 | 0 | 0 |
| 1998–99 | Philadelphia Flyers | NHL | 78 | 0 | 6 | 6 | 106 | — | — | — | — | — |
| 1999–2000 | Philadelphia Flyers | NHL | 74 | 2 | 5 | 7 | 140 | 18 | 0 | 1 | 1 | 41 |
| 2000–01 | Philadelphia Flyers | NHL | 82 | 2 | 6 | 8 | 131 | 6 | 0 | 0 | 0 | 4 |
| 2001–02 | Philadelphia Flyers | NHL | 72 | 1 | 8 | 9 | 102 | 5 | 0 | 0 | 0 | 4 |
| 2002–03 | Columbus Blue Jackets | NHL | 82 | 0 | 13 | 13 | 73 | — | — | — | — | — |
| 2003–04 | Columbus Blue Jackets | NHL | 64 | 1 | 5 | 6 | 48 | — | — | — | — | — |
| 2005–06 | Columbus Blue Jackets | NHL | 44 | 1 | 6 | 7 | 30 | — | — | — | — | — |
| 2005–06 | Toronto Maple Leafs | NHL | 21 | 0 | 3 | 3 | 41 | — | — | — | — | — |
| 2006–07 | Tampa Bay Lightning | NHL | 27 | 0 | 3 | 3 | 16 | — | — | — | — | — |
| 2007–08 | Ottawa Senators | NHL | 76 | 2 | 7 | 9 | 41 | — | — | — | — | — |
| 2008–09 | Ottawa Senators | NHL | 2 | 0 | 0 | 0 | 2 | — | — | — | — | — |
| NHL totals | | | 1,417 | 35 | 166 | 201 | 2,014 | 69 | 0 | 8 | 8 | 130 |

=== International ===
| Year | Team | Event | Result | GP | G | A | Pts | PIM |
|---|---|---|---|---|---|---|---|---|
| 1987 | Canada | WJC | DQ | 6 | 0 | 0 | 0 | 0 |
| 1994 | Canada | WC | 1st place, gold medalist(s) | 8 | 0 | 1 | 1 | 6 |
| 1996 | Canada | WC | 2nd place, silver medalist(s) | 8 | 0 | 0 | 0 | 12 |
| Senior totals | | | | 16 | 0 | 1 | 1 | 18 |

== Head coaching record ==
| Team | Year | Regular season | | | | | | Postseason | | | |
| Team | Year | G | W | L | OTL | Pts | Finish | W | L | Win % | Result |
|---|---|---|---|---|---|---|---|---|---|---|---|
| CHI | 2022–23 | 82 | 26 | 49 | 7 | 59 | 8th in Central | — | — | — | Missed playoffs |
| CHI | 2023–24 | 82 | 23 | 53 | 6 | 52 | 8th in Central | — | — | — | Missed playoffs |
| CHI | 2024–25 | 26 | 8 | 16 | 2 | 18 | (fired) | — | — | — | — |
| Total | | 190 | 57 | 118 | 15 | | | — | — | — | |

== See also ==
- Captain (ice hockey)
- List of NHL players with 1,000 games played
- List of NHL players with 2,000 career penalty minutes

Awards and achievements
| Preceded by Vincent Damphousse | Toronto Maple Leafs first-round draft pick 1987 | Succeeded by Scott Pearson |
Sporting positions
| Preceded by Ray Whitney | Columbus Blue Jackets captain 2003–2005 | Succeeded by Adam Foote |
| Preceded by Derek King (interim) | Head coach of the Chicago Blackhawks; 2022–2024 | Succeeded by Anders Sörensen (interim) |
