= Trent Yawney =

Canadian ice hockey player and coach

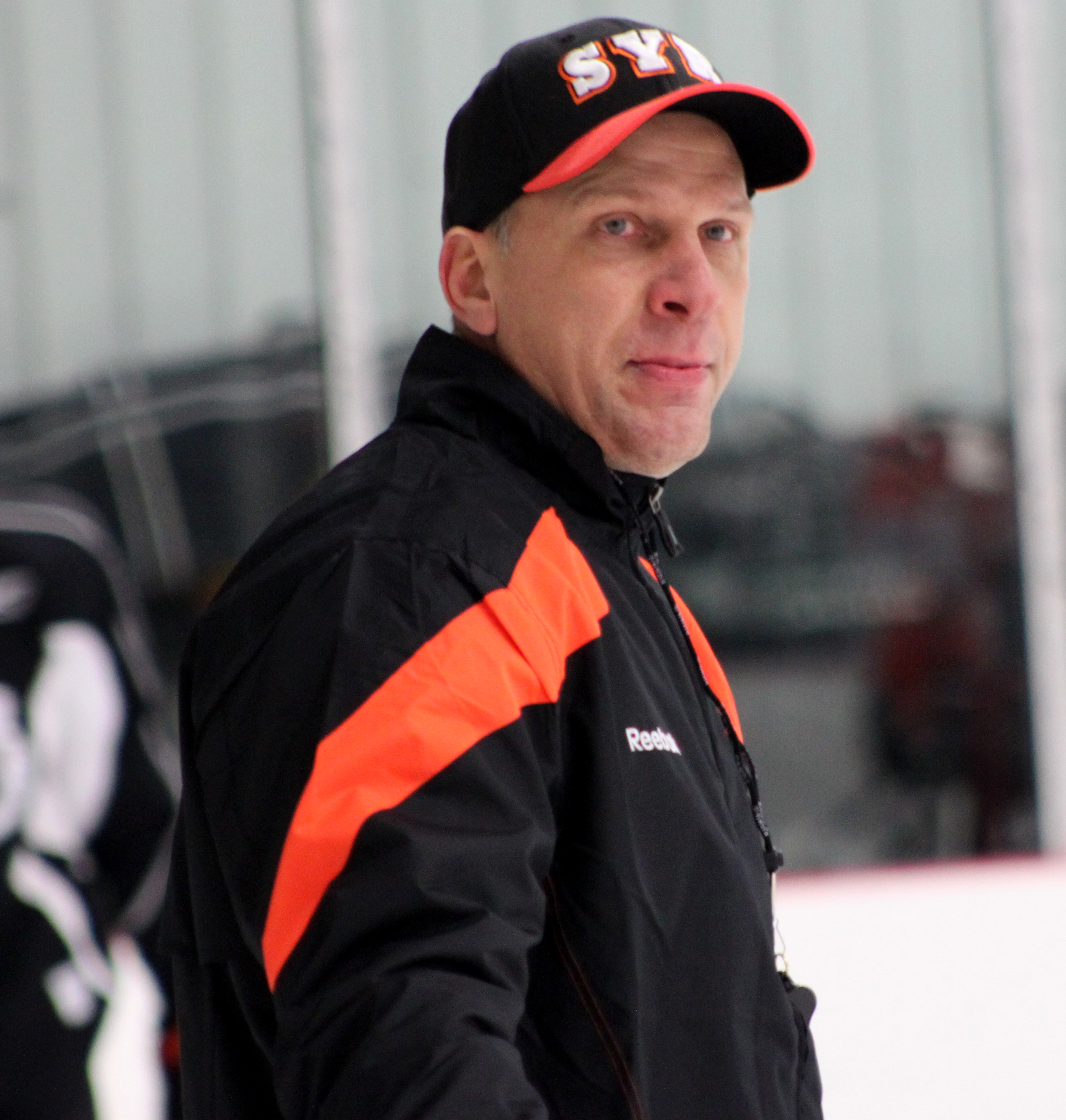
- Yawney in 2012
- Born: September 29, 1965 (age 60) Hudson Bay, Saskatchewan, Canada
- Height: 6 ft 3 in (191 cm)
- Weight: 195 lb (88 kg; 13 st 13 lb)
- Position: Defence
- Shot: Left
- Played for: Chicago Blackhawks; Calgary Flames; St. Louis Blues
- Coached for: Los Angeles Kings; Chicago Blackhawks; Detroit Red Wings
- National team: Canada
- NHL draft: 45th overall, 1984; Chicago Blackhawks
- Playing career: 1982–1999
- Coaching career: 1999–present

Medal record

Representing Canada

World Championships
Silver medal – second place	1991 Finland	

Trent G. Yawney (born September 29, 1965) is a Canadian professional hockey coach and a former defenceman. He is an assistant coach for the Detroit Red Wings in the National Hockey League. He has previously served as the head coach of the Chicago Blackhawks, a professional scout for the Anaheim Ducks, and assistant coach with the Los Angeles Kings, San Jose Sharks, Edmonton Oilers and the Anaheim Ducks.

== Playing career ==
Yawney played for the Saskatoon J's of the Saskatchewan Junior Hockey League (SJHL), and then the Saskatoon Blades of the Western Hockey League (WHL). Yawney was drafted by the Chicago Blackhawks in the 1984 NHL entry draft, third round, 45th overall. After playing with the Canadian national men's hockey team, Yawney played in the NHL for the Blackhawks, Calgary Flames, and St. Louis Blues.

== Post-playing career ==
Yawney was an assistant coach of the Chicago Blackhawks during the 1999–2000 NHL season, then head coach of the Norfolk Admirals in the American Hockey League (AHL) from 2000 to 2005. On July 7, 2005, Yawney was named head coach of the Blackhawks. On November 27, 2006 Yawney was let go and replaced by former player and assistant coach with the Blackhawks Denis Savard. On January 10, 2012 Yawney was named associate head coach of the AHL's Syracuse Crunch. Yawney led the team to a 22-14-2-4 record in the final 42 games to help the Crunch clinch a playoff berth for the first time since 2008.

On April 23, 2018 the Anaheim Ducks announced that they were not renewing Yawney's assistant coach contract.

== Personal life ==
Yawney and his wife Charlane have two children.

== Coaching record ==
=== NHL ===
Team	Year	Regular season						Postseason
Team	Year	G	W	L	OTL	Pts	Division rank	Result
CHI	2005–06	82	26	43	13	65	4th in Central	Missed playoffs
CHI	2006–07	21	7	12	2	(71)	5th in Central	(fired)
Total		103	33	55	15			

=== AHL ===
Team	Year	Regular season							Postseason			
Team	Year	G	W	L	T	OTL	Pts	Finish	W	L	Win %	Result
NOR	2000–01	80	36	26	13	5	90	3rd in South	4	5	.444	Lost in Division Finals
NOR	2001–02	80	38	26	12	4	92	1st in South	1	3	.250	Lost in Conference Quarterfinals
NOR	2002–03	80	37	26	12	5	91	1st in South	5	4	.556	Lost in Conference Semifinals
NOR	2003–04	80	35	36	4	5	79	5th in East	4	4	.500	Lost in Division Semifinals
NOR	2004–05	80	43	30	—	7	93	3rd in East	2	4	.333	Lost in Division Semifinals
SYR	2011–12	42	22	14	—	6	(50)	4th in East	1	3	.250	Lost in Conference Quarterfinals
NOR	2012–13	76	37	34	—	5	79	5th in East	—	—	—	Missed playoffs
NOR	2013–14	76	40	26	—	10	90	3rd in East	5	5	.500	Lost in Conference Semifinals
Total		594	288	218	41	47		2 division titles	22	28	.440	7 playoff appearances

== Career statistics ==
=== Regular season and playoffs ===
			Regular season					Playoffs
Season	Team	League	GP	G	A	Pts	PIM	GP	G	A	Pts	PIM
1981–82	Saskatoon Blues AAA	SMHL	—	—	—	—	—	—	—	—	—	—
1981–82	Saskatoon Blades	WHL	6	1	0	1	0	—	—	—	—	—
1982–83	Saskatoon Blades	WHL	59	6	31	37	44	6	0	2	2	0
1983–84	Saskatoon Blades	WHL	72	13	46	59	81	—	—	—	—	—
1984–85	Saskatoon Blades	WHL	72	16	51	67	158	3	1	6	7	7
1985–86	Canadian National Team	Intl	73	6	15	21	60	—	—	—	—	—
1986–87	Canadian National Team	Intl	51	4	15	19	37	—	—	—	—	—
1987–88	Canadian National Team	Intl	68	5	13	18	87	—	—	—	—	—
1987–88	Chicago Blackhawks	NHL	15	2	8	10	15	5	0	4	4	8
1988–89	Chicago Blackhawks	NHL	69	5	19	24	116	15	3	6	9	20
1989–90	Chicago Blackhawks	NHL	70	5	15	20	82	20	3	5	8	27
1990–91	Chicago Blackhawks	NHL	61	3	13	16	77	1	0	0	0	0
1991–92	Calgary Flames	NHL	47	4	9	13	45	—	—	—	—	—
1991–92	Indianapolis Ice	IHL	9	2	3	5	12	—	—	—	—	—
1992–93	Calgary Flames	NHL	63	1	16	17	67	6	3	2	5	6
1993–94	Calgary Flames	NHL	58	6	15	21	60	7	0	0	0	16
1994–95	Calgary Flames	NHL	37	0	2	2	108	2	0	0	0	2
1995–96	Calgary Flames	NHL	69	0	3	3	88	4	0	0	0	2
1996–97	St. Louis Blues	NHL	39	0	2	2	17	—	—	—	—	—
1997–98	Chicago Blackhawks	NHL	45	1	0	1	76	—	—	—	—	—
1998–99	Chicago Blackhawks	NHL	20	0	0	0	32	—	—	—	—	—
NHL totals			593	27	102	129	783	60	9	17	26	81

=== International ===
Year	Team	Event	GP	G	A	Pts	PIM
1988	Canada	OG	8	1	1	2	6
1991	Canada	WC	10	2	4	6	4
1992	Canada	WC	6	0	1	1	4
Senior totals			24	3	6	9	14

Preceded by Brian Sutter	Head coach of the Chicago Blackhawks; 2005-06	Succeeded by Denis Savard
Preceded by None	Head coach of the Norfolk Admirals; 2000–05	Succeeded by Mike Haviland
