= Bill Tobin (ice hockey) =

Canadian ice hockey player, coach, and executive

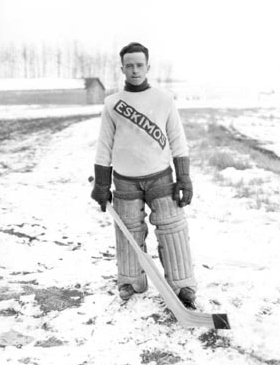
- Tobin with the Edmonton Eskimos in the 1921–22 season.
- Born: May 20, 1895 Ottawa, Ontario, Canada
- Died: May 8, 1963 (aged 67) Chicago, Illinois, U.S.
- Height: 5 ft 7 in (170 cm)
- Weight: 150 lb (68 kg; 10 st 10 lb)
- Position: Goaltender
- Caught: Left
- Played for: Edmonton Eskimos
- Playing career: 1922–1925

William John Tobin (May 20, 1895 – May 8, 1963) was a Canadian ice hockey player, executive and head coach. He was a senior executive with the Chicago Black Hawks for the team's first 36 years of existence, also serving as coach for parts of two seasons. From 1946 to 1950, he was also the team's principal owner.

== Personal information ==
Tobin was born in Ottawa, Ontario. Tobin died in Chicago's Mercy Hospital of emphysema. He was survived by his wife Muriel, son Donald W. and daughter Mrs. Elaine Bovaird, all of Chicago, and two sisters, Mrs. Maude Sunderland and Mrs. Gertrude Ashe, both of Ottawa.

== Ice hockey career ==
Tobin was a goaltender for several senior hockey teams of the Ottawa City Hockey League before signing with the Edmonton Eskimos of the Big-4 League in Alberta. His signing provoked a controversy that helped to end the league. Tobin's eligibility to play for the Eskimos was questioned and an inquiry was held. The Calgary Tigers, upset with the makeup of the panel which investigated Tobin's status, refused to accept the decision and refused to play the league championship against Edmonton. Calgary broke from league affairs along with other Calgary teams, leading to the league to fold. Tobin played from the 1920–21 season until 1924–25 with Edmonton, which moved to the Western Canada Hockey League.

In 1926, Tobin helped found the new Chicago Black Hawks organization. He'd traveled to Chicago after spending most of the previous year out of hockey, and hoped to find a job. Founder and owner Major Frederic McLaughlin made Tobin his assistant and head of hockey operations. Tobin was head coach of the Black Hawks for parts of two seasons, 1929–30 and 1931–32. He was promoted to team president in 1938. He was included on the Stanley Cup team picture with Chicago as executive in 1934 and 1938. However, his name was only included on the Cup in 1938.

In 1941, Tobin took over the independent Kansas City Americans of the American Hockey Association, later in the United States Hockey League. Tobin operated the team until 1951, when it became part of the Black Hawks' organization.

After McLaughlin's death, Tobin nominally headed a syndicate that bought the Hawks from the McLaughlin estate. However, it was an open secret in NHL circles that Tobin was a stand-in for Detroit Red Wings owner James E. Norris, who helped Tobin put together his syndicate. Norris had been the Black Hawks' landlord since 1936, when he bought Chicago Stadium. While NHL rules prohibited the ownership of multiple teams by one owner, the arrangement effectively allowed Norris to control the two teams. In 1950, Tobin sold his share of the Hawks to James D. Norris and Arthur Wirtz. He remained vice president and head of hockey operations until 1954, when Tommy Ivan became general manager. He retained the title of vice-president of the team after the sale, until his death in 1963.

== Coaching record ==
Team	Year	Regular season						Postseason
Team	Year	G	W	L	T	Pts	Division rank	Result
CHI	1929–30	23	11	10	2	24	2nd in American	Lost in first round (2-3 vs. MTL)
CHI	1931–32	48	18	19	11	47	2nd in American	Lost in first round (2-6 vs. TOR)
Total		71	29	29	13	71		

Preceded by first GM	General Manager of the Chicago Black Hawks; 1926–54	Succeeded by Tommy Ivan
Preceded by Tom Shaughnessy; Dick Irvin	Head coach of the Chicago Black Hawks; 1930; 1931–32	Succeeded by Dick Irvin; Emil Iverson
