= Godfrey Matheson =

Canadian ice hockey coach

- Born: October 29, 1881; Kildonan, Manitoba, Canada
- Died: January 20, 1978 (aged 96); Skowhegan, Maine, U.S.
- Occupation: Ice hockey coach

Godfrey Arthur Matheson (October 29, 1881 – January 20, 1978) was a Canadian ice hockey coach. Matheson was head coach of the Chicago Black Hawks for one season, 1932–33, along with Emil Iverson.

== Career ==
On October 15, 1931, Matheson was named coach of the Chicago Blackhawks. He attempted to innovate coaching by using a whistle system; One whistle to pass, two for a shot etc. He also expected Taffy Abel to score two goals a game while screening the goaltender. Matheson only lasted for two NHL games with the Chicago Black Hawks before being fired by team owner Major Frederic McLaughlin.

== Coaching record ==
Team	Year	Regular season						Post season
Team	Year	G	W	L	T	Pts	Division rank	Result
CHI	1932–33	2	0	2	0	0	4th in American	Interim Head Coach
Total		2	0	2	0	0		

Preceded by Emil Iverson	Head coach of the Chicago Black Hawks; 1933	Succeeded by Tommy Gorman
