= Emil Iverson =

Danish-American ice hockey player & coach

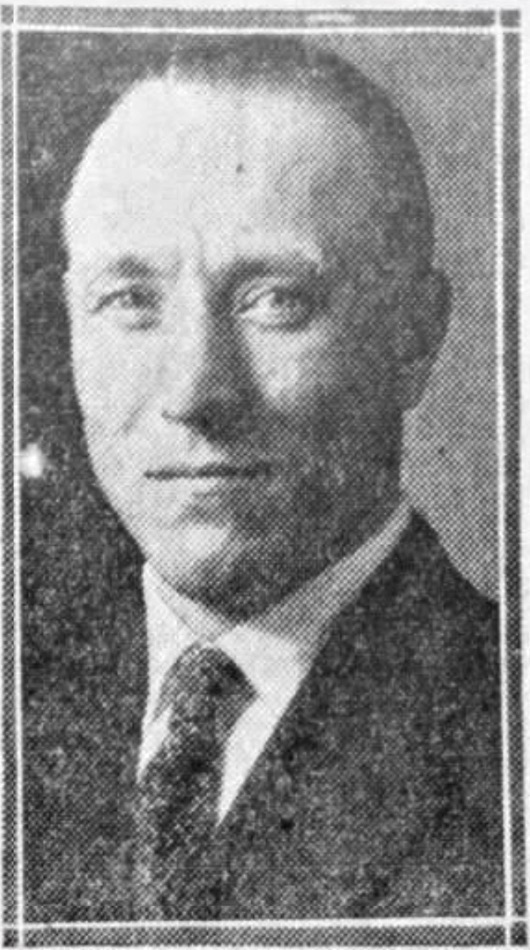
- Iverson c. 1926
- Born: Emil Waldemar Iverson; November 2, 1892; Copenhagen, Denmark
- Died: February 21, 1960 (aged 67); Chicago, Illinois
- Occupation: Ice hockey coach
- Known for: Head coach of Chicago Black Hawks (1932–33)

Emil Waldemar Iverson (November 2, 1892 – February 21, 1960) was a Danish-American ice hockey player and coach, and an anthropologist. The Minnesota Golden Gophers ice hockey team of the University of Minnesota won seven national championships while Iverson was coach. His training programs were so ahead of the times, that some are still used today. Iverson was head coach of the Chicago Black Hawks for one season, 1932–33, along with Godfrey Matheson.

== Biography ==
He was born on November 2, 1892, in Copenhagen, Denmark.

When Emil Iverson and his brother Kay first arrived in America they coached different ice hockey teams in Chicago and Detroit, before starting coaching at universities in Minnesota and Wisconsin.

Iverson did anthropological work on the Ojibwa First Nations people in areas around the Great Lakes and Minnesota/Ontario border.

He died on February 21, 1960, at the Illinois Masonic Hospital in Chicago, Illinois.

== Anthropology and other pursuits ==
Emil Iverson was responsible for discovering 50 Ojibwa skeletons and native artifacts in 1928. The site was one of the last undisturbed dwellings inhabited by the Kawawaigamak people of the First Nation Ojibwa people. He continued to conduct extensive research regarding the history of the Ojibwa people that seasonally migrated throughout Hunters Island and the Border Lakes. The thriving tribe of Kabwawiagamaks, located at Kawa Bay, were eventually decimated by the Spanish influenza epidemic and the forced removal by the Canadian Government. The people of the village were known by the European settlers as the Kabwawiagamaks – because of their proximity to, and reliance on, what is now called the Wawiag River. After discovering the village Emil Iverson made sure the dead got the proper burial rites and brought back many artifacts to the Nett Lake people – their reservation being adjacent to his outfitting headquarters. This act of kindness was greatly revered by the Kawa Bay Band; to show their gratitude, Emil was given a ceremonial drum and the Annishinabe name "Chief of the Big Waters". The survey and graves proved once and for all, the size and scope of the Kabwawiagamak village was much larger than previously thought. His movie and photos of the expedition were shown to President Coolidge to help preserve the Quetico and Boundary Waters area. The complete story of his expedition and the history of Two Rivers, a leader of the Kabwawiaigamak Ojibwa, can be found in the novel Hunters and Hearts. Educational information can be found in past issues of The Ely Echo, The Chicago Area Pioneer Press, Minnesota Sun, U. of M newspapers, 13 Moons, The McHenry County Living Magazine, or by going to www.huntersandhearts.com.

In addition to his advocacy for the Annishinabe people, Emil Iverson developed one of the first fishing and exploration programs for women.

Iverson also traveled throughout Asia and Africa hunting big game and exploring both continents. A previously unknown location, southeast of Kawa Bay is currently being researched by this family in an effort led by his grandsons.

== Head coaching record ==
=== NHL ===
Team	Year	Regular season						Postseason
Team	Year	G	W	L	T	Pts	Division rank	Result
CHI	1932–33	21	8	7	6	22	4th in American	Fired
Total		21	8	7	6	22		

=== College ===
Record table
Season	Team	Overall	Conference	Standing	Postseason
Minnesota Golden Gophers Independent (1922–1930)
1922–23	Minnesota	10–1–1			West Intercollegiate Champion
1923–24	Minnesota	13–1–0			West Intercollegiate Champion
1924–25	Minnesota	8–1–1			
1925–26	Minnesota	12–0–4			West Intercollegiate Champion
1926–27	Minnesota	9–6–0			
1927–28	Minnesota	9–2–2			
1928–29	Minnesota	14–2–1			West Intercollegiate Champion
1929–30	Minnesota	7–9–2			
Minnesota:		82–22–9			
Total:		82–22–9			
National champion Postseason invitational champion Conference regular season champion Conference regular season and conference tournament champion Division regular season champion Division regular season and conference tournament champion Conference tournament champion

Preceded by Bill Tobin	Head coach of the Chicago Black Hawks; 1932–33	Succeeded by Godfrey Matheson
