= Anders Sörensen =

Swedish ice hockey player and coach

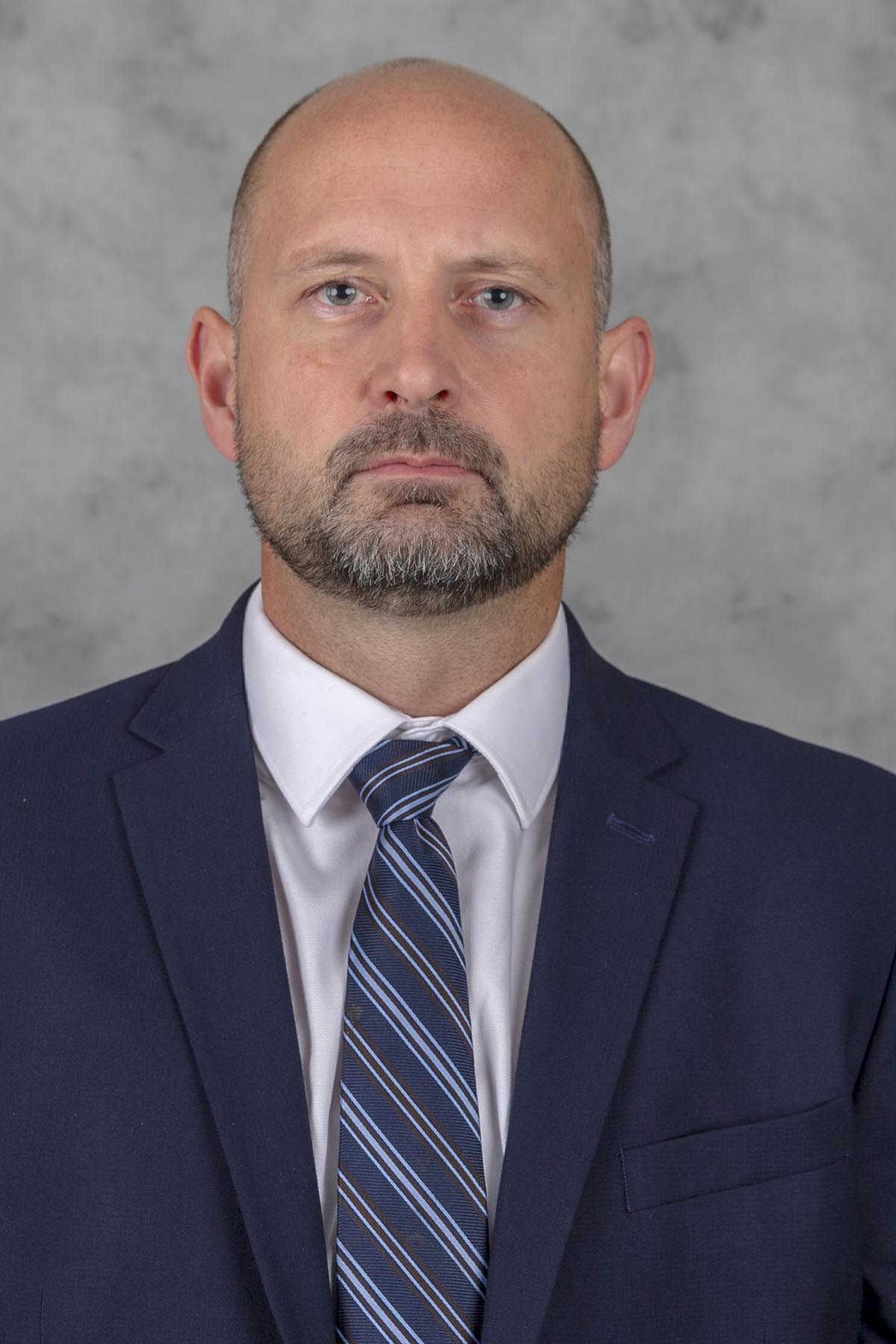
- Sörensen in 2022
- Born: 11 May 1975 (age 51) Södertälje, Sweden
- Height: 5 ft 9 in (175 cm)
- Weight: 172 lb (78 kg; 12 st 4 lb)
- Position: Defence
- Shot: Left
- Played for: Ducs d'Angers; Sparta Sarpsborg
- Current NHL coach: Chicago Blackhawks
- NHL draft: Undrafted
- Playing career: 1993–2000
- Coaching career: 2011–present

Anders Sörensen (born 11 May 1975) is a Swedish professional ice hockey assistant coach with the Chicago Blackhawks of the National Hockey League (NHL). He previously coached the Rockford IceHogs, Chicago's American Hockey League (AHL) affiliate. Sörensen was the Blackhawks' interim head coach during the 2024–25 NHL season. He is the first Swedish-born head coach in NHL history.

== Playing career ==
Sörensen played for Södertälje SK as a defenceman from 1992–1995. He also played for clubs in France and Norway. Sörensen traveled to North America to play for the Mobile Mysticks and Baton Rouge Kingfish of the ECHL during the 1999–2000 season. He tallied three goals and one assist in 37 games. He retired from playing in 2000 and went into coaching.

== Coaching career ==
Sörensen coached various youth hockey programs throughout the early 2000s in the Chicago area. In 2006, he began coaching for the Chicago Mission of the Tier 1 Elite Hockey League, where he helped develop future NHLers Ryan Hartman, Vinnie Hinostroza, and Nick Schmaltz.

Sörensen returned to his hometown of Södertälje to become an assistant coach for Södertälje SK of HockeyAllsvenskan in 2011. He was named as the team's interim head coach in October 2013.

He joined the Chicago Blackhawks organization in 2013 as a development coach. Sörensen transitioned to the Rockford IceHogs of the AHL in 2018, serving as an assistant coach and later as an associate coach. In 2021, he took over as the interim head coach of the IceHogs. Sörensen maintained a 117–89–16–7 record in 229 games through his first three seasons as head coach and reached the playoffs in each of these seasons.

On 5 December 2024, the Blackhawks appointed Sörensen their interim head coach after firing Luke Richardson, making Sörenson the first Swedish-born head coach in NHL history. He made his NHL debut on 7 December, in a 4–2 loss to the Winnipeg Jets. Sörensen concluded his first season in the NHL with a 17–30–9 record as the Blackhawks finished last the Central division and with the second-worst record in the league. In May 2025, the Blackhawks hired Jeff Blashill as their head coach. The team retained Sörensen as an assistant coach under Blashill.

== Personal life ==
Sörensen is married and has four children. He is close friends with fellow Swede Michael Nylander. Sörensen was the personal coach of Michael's sons, William and Alexander Nylander.

== Career statistics ==
			Regular season					Playoffs
Season	Team	League	GP	G	A	Pts	PIM	GP	G	A	Pts	PIM
1993–94	Södertälje SK	SWE.2	2	0	0	0	0	—	—	—	—	—
1994–95	Södertälje SK	J20	26	0	9	9	28	—	—	—	—	—
1995–96	Södertälje SK	J20	27	5	12	17	20	—	—	—	—	—
1995–96	Södertälje SK	SWE.2	10	0	0	0	0	3	0	0	0	0
1996–97	Ducs d'Angers	FRA	25	2	13	15	28	—	—	—	—	—
1997–98	Sparta Sarpsborg	NOR	43	7	20	27	20	—	—	—	—	—
1998–99	Fort Worth Fire	CHL	17	3	6	9	4	—	—	—	—	—
1998–99	Tupelo T-Rex	WPHL	8	0	1	1	8	—	—	—	—	—
1999–00	Mobile Mysticks	ECHL	29	2	1	3	8	—	—	—	—	—
1999–00	Baton Rouge Kingfish	ECHL	8	1	0	1	6	2	0	0	0	0
FRA totals			25	2	13	15	28	—	—	—	—	—
NOR totals			43	7	20	27	20	—	—	—	—	—

== Head coaching record ==
=== HockeyAllsvenskan ===
Team	Year	Regular season							Postseason			
Team	Year	G	W	OTW	OTL	L	Pts	Finish	W	L	Win%	Result
SSK	2013–14	20	5	2	1	12	(20)	(interim)	—	—	—	—
Total		20	5	2	1	12			—	—	—	

=== AHL ===
Team	Year	Regular season							Postseason			
Team	Year	G	W	L	OTL	SOL	Pts	Finish	W	L	Win %	Result
RFD	2021–22	66	35	26	4	1	(75)	4th in Central	2	3	.400	Lost in division semifinals (CHI)
RFD	2022–23	72	35	28	5	4	79	5th in Central	2	3	.400	Lost in division semifinals (TEX)
RFD	2023–24	72	39	26	5	2	85	3rd in Central	1	3	.250	Lost in division semifinals (GR)
RFD	2024–25	19	8	9	2	0	(18)	(promoted)	—	—	—	—
Total		229	117	89	16	7			5	9	.357	3 playoff appearances

=== NHL ===
Team	Year	Regular season						Postseason			
Team	Year	G	W	L	OTL	Pts	Finish	W	L	Win %	Result
CHI	2024–25	56	17	30	9	(43)	8th in Central	—	—	—	Missed playoffs
Total		56	17	30	9			—	—	—	

Sporting positions
Preceded by Luke Richardson	Head coach of the Chicago Blackhawks; 2024–2025	Succeeded by Jeff Blashill
