= Bill Stewart (sports official) =

American coach and sports official (1895–1964)

- Stewart in his umpiring attire
- Born: September 20, 1895; Fitchburg, Massachusetts, US
- Died: February 18, 1964 (aged 68); Boston, Massachusetts, US
- Occupations: MLB umpire NHL referee Chicago Black Hawks head coach
- Awards: 1938 Stanley Cup; United States Hockey Hall of Fame

William Joseph Stewart (September 20, 1895 – February 18, 1964) was an American coach and sports official who was a referee in the National Hockey League (NHL) and an umpire in Major League Baseball (MLB). In 1938, as head coach of the Chicago Black Hawks, he led the team to a championship, becoming the first U.S.-born coach to win the Stanley Cup. He is an inductee of the United States Hockey Hall of Fame. Stewart also had a long career in Minor League Baseball as a player, manager, and scout.

== Early years ==
Born in Fitchburg, Massachusetts, Stewart grew up in Boston, Massachusetts, and competed in baseball, hockey, track, and wrestling in high school.

== Sports career ==
=== Baseball player, manager, and scout ===
In 1913, Stewart became a minor league baseball player with Worcester in the New England League, and in 1917 while with Montreal he was the first International League player to enlist for World War I service, joining the United States Navy. In these pre-war seasons, he primarily played as an outfielder.

After the war, Stewart was signed by the Chicago White Sox in December 1918, but he suffered an arm injury falling down a flight of stairs while working as a census taker, and was sent to the minor leagues in May 1919. As he was, apparently, on a major league roster yet never appeared in a major league game, Stewart is an example of a "phantom ballplayer."

In the 1920s, Stewart played parts of several seasons in the minor leagues, including three seasons as a pitcher: 1922 in Syracuse, New York, 1927 in Nashua, New Hampshire with the Nashua Millionaires, and 1928 in Waterbury, Connecticut.

Stewart was also a manager during three seasons: 1927 with the Nashua Millionaires, 1928 in Waterbury, and 1931 in Springfield, Massachusetts. He was also a scout for the Boston Red Sox in 1926 and 1927.

In 1929, he played summer baseball for Falmouth in the Cape Cod Baseball League. A steady pitcher, he was described as "making up for his lack of speed with plenty of control and lots of headwork."

=== Ice hockey coach and referee ===
During baseball offseasons in the 1910s and 1920s, Stewart generally coached Boston-area college and high school hockey teams. From 1925 to 1931 he was the head coach at the Massachusetts Institute of Technology.

In 1928, Stewart became the NHL's first U.S.-born referee, and served in that capacity until 1941, excepting his two seasons as coach of the Chicago Black Hawks; 1937–38 (when the team won the Stanley Cup) and 1938–39.

==== Coaching record ====
Team	Year	Regular season						Post season			
Team	Year	G	W	L	T	Pts	Finish	W	L	Win %	Result
CHI	1937–38	48	14	25	9	37	3rd in American	7	3	.700	Won Stanley Cup (TOR)
CHI	1938–39	21	8	10	3	19	7th in NHL	–	–	–	Fired
Total		69	22	35	12	56		7	3	.700	1 Stanley Cup

=== Baseball umpire ===
In 1930, Stewart became an umpire in the Eastern League, and later officiated in the International League and New York–Pennsylvania League.

Stewart was an umpire in the National League (NL) from 1933 to 1954, and officiated in four World Series (1937, 1943, 1948, 1953) and four All-Star Games (1936, 1940, 1948, 1954), calling balls and strikes for the last contest. He also was the home plate umpire for Johnny Vander Meer's second consecutive no-hitter in 1938, and was the crew chief for the 1951 three-game pennant playoff between the New York Giants and the Brooklyn Dodgers.

During the 1948 World Series, Stewart made a controversial call in game one, which received significant press coverage. In a scoreless game in the bottom of the eighth inning. Boston Braves' pinch runner Phil Masi was on second base with one out. Cleveland Indians' pitcher Bob Feller attempted to pick off Masi at second base, and shortstop Lou Boudreau appeared to tag Masi out; however, Stewart called Masi safe. Masi subsequently scored the only run of the game, giving the Braves a win in the first game of the series. Stewart's ruling was hotly debated in the media and by fans, especially after Associated Press photographs of the play were published. Despite losing the first game, Cleveland would go on to win the series in six games. Upon his death in 1990, Masi's will revealed that he really was out on the play.

Stewart worked 714 consecutive games from the time he entered the NL until September 1938, when he was stricken with appendicitis. He resigned from the NL umpiring staff in January 1955 after not being promoted to league supervisor, a position he claimed had been promised him by commissioner Ford Frick when he had been NL president; new league president Warren Giles instead announced that the position would not be filled.

== Later years ==
After retiring as an umpire, Stewart continued to work as a scout for the Cleveland Indians and Washington Senators.

Stewart coached the U.S. men's national hockey team in 1957, posting a 23–3–1 record, but the team was barred by the U.S. State Department from participating in the World Championships following the Soviet invasion of Hungary.

In February 1964, Stewart died at the Veterans Administration Hospital near his home in the Jamaica Plain section of Boston, after suffering a stroke two weeks earlier.

Stewart was inducted into the United States Hockey Hall of Fame in 1982. His grandson Paul became an NHL player and referee and like his grandfather was elected to the United States Hockey Hall of Fame in 2018.

Preceded by Clem Loughlin	Head coach of the Chicago Black Hawks; 1937–39	Succeeded by Paul Thompson
