= Deaths in November 1979 =

The following is a list of notable deaths in November 1979. Entries for each day are listed alphabetically by surname. A typical entry lists information in the following sequence:

- Name, age, country of citizenship at birth, subsequent country of citizenship (if applicable), reason for notability, cause of death (if known), and reference.

== November 1979 ==
=== 1 ===
- Cees Bolding, 82, Dutch painter.
- Walter Buchheim, 75, East German politician and trade unionist.
- Bob Clayton, 57, American game show host and announcer, cardiac arrest.
- James H. Cummings, 88, American politician, member of the Tennessee House of Representatives (1929–1949, 1953–1973).
- Anna de Villiers, 78, South African writer and educator.
- Bernie Digris, 60, American football player.
- Rudi Dobermann, 76, German Olympic long jumper (1928).
- Mamie Eisenhower, 82, American socialite, first lady of the United States (1953–1961), complications from a stroke.
- Zenjirō Horikiri, 95, Japanese politician.
- Kensuke Horinouchi, 93, Japanese diplomat.
- Mario Leite Neto, 48, Brazilian Olympic equestrian (1960).
- Morton Masius, 96, German-American chemist.
- José Alonso Nieves, 35, Puerto Rican Olympic boxer (1964).
- Albert Préjean, 85, French actor and singer.
- Dominique Rustichelli, 45, French footballer.
- Neal Storter, 89, American football player, pneumonia.
- Saro Urzì, 66, Italian actor.
- Philip van Pallandt, 89, Dutch scouting leader.

=== 2 ===
- Johnny Bakke, 70, Norwegian politician.
- George Brodrick, 2nd Earl of Midleton, 91, English hereditary peer.
- Fritz Gromotka, 64, German flying ace.
- Henri Hay De Slade, 86, French flying ace.
- Ernst Kals, 74, German U-boat captain.
- Sir T. D. Kendrick, 84, British archaeologist and art historian.
- Jacques Mesrine, 42, French career criminal, shot.
- Arnaldo Rodríguez Lazo, 78, Chilean politician.
- Gaston Ruter, 81, French entomologist.
- Sewell Stokes, 76, English playwright and novelist.
- Joseph Wawrykow, 71, Canadian politician.

=== 3 ===
- Oskar Angelus, 86, Estonian politician and Nazi collaborator.
- Raffaele Bendandi, 86, Italian seismologist.
- Paolo Carlini, 57, Italian actor.
- Tom Green, 70, Australian footballer.
- Bertha Hardegger, 76, Swiss physician and missionary.
- Hugh P. Harris, 70, American general, cancer.
- Joseph Gaither Pratt, 69, American parapsychologist, heart attack.
- Gene Tracy, 52, American comedian and recording artist, heart attack.

=== 4 ===
- Morris Chalfen, 72, American basketball executive and impresario.
- Jeanne D'Autremont, 80, French chess player.
- Arthur Randolph Kelly, 79, American archaeologist.
- Yuri Krylov, 49, Soviet Olympic ice hockey player (1956).
- Johnny Priest, 88, American baseball player.
- Yank Terry, 68, American baseball player.
- Robert Hardin Williams, 70, American endocrinologist.

=== 5 ===
- Al Capp, 70, American cartoonist (Li'l Abner).
- Marcel Cariven, 85, French conductor.
- Ali Danaeifard, 58, Iranian football player and manager.
- K. B. Desai, 82, Indian politician and physician.
- Zaki Harari, 53, Egyptian Olympic basketball player (1952).
- Prince Johannes of Liechtenstein, 80, Liechtensteiner royal.
- Andy McCall, 68, Scottish football player and manager.
- Dwight F. McKinney, 90, American magazine editor.
- Amedeo Nazzari, 71, Italian actor.
- Richard E. Nugent, 76, American general.
- Busso Peus, 71, German politician.
- Andrey Abraham Potter, 97, Russian-born American engineer and academic administrator.
- Lisa Regnell, 92, Swedish Olympic diver (1912).
- Jean Rigal, 88, French footballer.

=== 6 ===
- James Berry, 73, British-born New Zealand artist.
- Harry Dansey, 59, New Zealand journalist and politician.
- Dulcify, 4, New Zealand Thoroughbred racehorse, euthanized.
- Chick Evans, 89, American golfer.
- Louisa Fast, 101, American suffragist.
- Carlisle Jarvis, 72, Australian footballer.
- Luis Mayanés, 54, Chilean footballer.
- Hugh Ottaway, 54, British music critic.
- Cecil Purdy, 73, Australian chess player and writer.
- Alexander Weinstein, 82, Russian-born German-American mathematician, complications from surgery.

=== 7 ===
- Herbert Adolfsson, 73, Swedish Olympic high jumper (1928).
- Betty Harvie Anderson, 66, British politician, MP (1959–1979), asthma attack.
- Joseph Delteil, 70, French speleologist.
- Sarah Webster Fabio, 51, American poet and literary critic, colon cancer.
- Gyula Germanus, 95, Hungarian writer and Islamic scholar.
- Harald Gundersen, 74, Norwegian footballer.
- Katarina Jakobsson, 29, Swedish murder victim, drowned.
- Frank O'Connor, 82, American actor and painter.
- Christine Renard, 50, French science fiction author.
- Badri Narain Sinha, 49, Indian police officer.
- Leon G. Small, 76, Canadian politician.
- Francis Spear, 76, English stained glass artist.

=== 8 ===
- Edward Ardizzone, 79, British artist and illustrator, heart attack.
- James L. Baldwin, 58, American general.
- Wilfred Bion, 82, English psychoanalyst.
- Yvonne de Gaulle, 79, French socialite, spouse of the president (1959–1969).
- John Joe Hayes, 84, Irish hurler.
- J. Thomas Heistand, 84, American Episcopalian prelate.
- Louis L. Manderino, 49, American judge, cardiac arrest.
- Benedict Obidinma Odinamadu, 52, Nigerian civil servant.
- Jaime Rest, 52, Argentine writer and literary critic.
- Rudolf Rominger, 71, Swiss alpine skier.
- Arkhip Ruchkin, 81, Soviet general.
- Sydney Tafler, 63, English actor.
- Samuel Tequi, 80, French racing cyclist.
- William John Vickers, 81, British physician.
- Faiz Muhammad Zikeria, 86–87, Afghan diplomat and politician, stroke.

=== 9 ===
- Connie Alexander, 81, British mountaineer and youth hostel advocate.
- Tammy Alexander, 16, American murder victim, shot.
- Juan Greene, 61, Irish physician and farmer.
- Betzy Holter, 86, Norwegian actress.
- Hassan Latif, 62–63, Pakistani composer.
- Robert Barr MacGregor, 83, British physician, traffic collision.
- Hisa Sawada, 81, Japanese politician.
- Beverley Shenstone, 73, Canadian aerodynamicist.
- Louise Thaden, 73, American aviator, heart attack.

=== 10 ===
- Harry Hart, 74, South African Olympic athlete (1932).
- Elsie W. Helmrich, 93, American literary scholar.
- Erwin Kramer, 77, East German politician.
- Amina Pirani Maggi, 87, Italian actress.
- Mahmud Al-Nashaf, 73, Israeli politician, MK (1959–1961).
- Alf Rolfsen, 84, Norwegian muralist.
- Friedrich Torberg, 71, Austrian writer.

=== 11 ===
- George Howie, 78, Ottoman-born American racing driver.
- Roland Johansson, 70, Swedish Olympic swimmer (1928).
- Esmond Ray Long, 89, American pathologist.
- Sir Lance Mallalieu, 74, British politician, MP (1931–1935, 1948–1974).
- Carl D. Olds, 67, New Zealand-born American mathematician.
- Thomas G. Pullen, 81, American academic administrator.
- Álvaro Ribeiro, 78, Brazilian Olympic sprinter (1924).
- Tom Ruddy, 77, English footballer.
- Dimitri Tiomkin, 85, Russian-American film composer and conductor, complications from a fall.
- Jakov Xoxa, 56, Albanian writer.

=== 12 ===
- Arthur Bagot, 91, Australian naval officer.
- Leopold Conville, 83, British soldier.
- Charles Eaton, 83, Australian air force officer.
- Everett Eischeid, 67, American football and basketball coach.
- Sir William Wyndham Green, 92, British general.
- Willem Nieuwenkamp, 76, Dutch geologist.
- Nikolai Onoprienko, 67, Soviet soldier.
- Pythagoras Papastamatiou, 49, Greek lyricist and playwright, heart attack.
- Lotte Wolf-Matthäus, 71, German singer.

=== 13 ===
- Josef Altstötter, 87, German judge and Nazi official.
- Alphons Barb, 78, Austrian archaeologist and museum curator.
- Freda Betti, 55, French singer.
- Francisco Accioly Rodrigues da Costa Filho, 59, Brazilian politician and lawyer.
- Dick Eason, 65, Australian footballer.
- Moose Goheen, 85, American ice hockey player.
- Alejandro González, 72, Uruguayan Olympic basketball player (1936).
- Ernest N. Harmon, 85, American general.
- Richard William Hunt, 71, English historian.
- John Kelly, 57, English cricketer.
- Tony Poncet, 60, Spanish-born French singer, cancer.
- Dimitris Psathas, 71–72, Greek playwright and satirist.
- Peter Rajkovich, 68, American football player.
- Erminio Sertorelli, 78, Italian Olympic skier (1932).
- Nils Thomas, 90, Norwegian Olympic sailor (1920).
- Frank Wallace, 57, American soccer player
- Daniel Zion, 96, Greek-born Israeli rabbi and political activist.

=== 14 ===
- Amelia Best, 79, Australian politician.
- François Brient, 78, French racing cyclist.
- Grahame Budge, 59, Canadian-Scottish rugby player.
- Oliver Garrett, 84, American police officer.
- Abram Harrison, 81, Canadian politician.
- Leo Maguire, 59, Australian footballer.
- Clifford Smallwood, 64, Canadian politician, MP (1958–1968).

=== 15 ===
- Ken Ash, 78, American baseball player.
- Barney Battles Jr., 74, Scottish footballer.
- Marthe Dupont, 87, Belgian tennis player.
- Bill Farrimond, 76, English cricketer.
- Lorenzo Gotuzzo, 58–59, Chilean public accountant and government official.
- Jed Harris, 79, Austrian-born American theatre producer.
- Sir Brian Kimmins, 80, British general.
- Ed Klieman, 61, American baseball player.
- Camille Laurens, 73, French politician.
- Hawea Mataira, 68, New Zealand rugby player.
- Patrick McGilligan, 90, Irish politician, TD (1923–1965).
- Sydor Rey, 71, Polish poet and novelist.
- Swami Satprakashananda, 91, Indian philosopher and religious scholar.
- Hugo Vondřejc, 69, Czech Olympic water polo player (1936).

=== 16 ===
- Bert Baston, 84, American football player.
- Rachel Yanait Ben-Zvi, 93, Russian-Israeli author and educator.
- William Drummond Bone, 71, Scottish painter.
- Jack Butterfield, 50, American baseball coach and executive, traffic collision.
- Cliff Carter, 80, American baseball player.
- Edna Clarke Hall, 100, English artist and illustrator.
- Joseph Iglehart, 88, American financier and baseball executive, traffic collision.
- George Korenistov, 79, Polish Orthodox prelate.
- Gunnar Lemvigh, 70, Danish actor.
- Roy Markham, 63, British plant virologist, stomach cancer.
- William Peare, 74, Irish cricketer.
- Juan Puentes, 75, Chilean politician.
- Ichirō Saitō, 70, Japanese film composer.
- Erhard Siedel, 84, German actor.
- Gwen Thiele, 61, Australian tennis player.
- Giuseppe Valentini, 79, Italian Albanologist and priest.

=== 17 ===
- Chu Yo-han, 78, South Korean poet and politician.
- Anders Ek, 63, Swedish actor.
- Sixto Escobar, 66, Puerto Rican boxer, complications from diabetes.
- John Glascock, 28, British musician (Jethro Tull), congenital heart defect.
- Gottfred Hoem, 79, Norwegian politician.
- Martti Liuttula, 85, Finnish Olympic sport shooter (1924).
- Don Post, 77, American businessman.
- Muhammad Najati Sidqi, 74, Palestinian political activist, trade unionist and writer.
- Naum Sluszny, 65, Swiss-Belgian pianist.
- Immanuel Velikovsky, 84, Russian-American psychoanalyst and writer.
- Harold M. Wheller, 97, Australian Methodist priest.
- Gilbert Woo, 67, Chinese-American newspaper editor.

=== 18 ===
- Charles Lodge Adamson, 73, English cricketer.
- Henk Bos, 78, Dutch painter.
- James Marshall Carter, 75, American judge, stroke.
- Selwyn Dewdney, 70, Canadian artist and writer.
- Billie S. Farnum, 63, American politician, member of the U.S. House of Representatives (1965–1967).
- Freddie Fitzsimmons, 78, American baseball player, heart attack.
- Grace Frick, 76, American translator and academic administrator, cancer.
- Éric Losfeld, 57, Belgian-born French publisher.
- Tar Schwammel, 71, American football player.
- Gavriil Veresov, 67, Soviet chess player.
- Sir Harry Wetherall, 90, British general.

=== 19 ===
- Bill Ackland-Horman, 65, Australian golfer.
- Dorothy Burlingham, 88, American-British psychoanalyst.
- Bill Colbourne, 83, Australian trade unionist and political organizer.
- Norah C. James, 82–83, English novelist.
- Max Proebstl, 66, German singer.
- Samuel M. Sampler, 84, American soldier.
- George She, 75, Hong Kong social activist.
- Dewey Short, 81, American politician, member of the U.S. House of Representatives (1929–1931, 1935–1957).
- Étienne Souriau, 87, French philosopher.

=== 20 ===
- Alan Barth, 73, American journalist, cancer.
- Leopoldo Costa, 78, Spanish football player and manager.
- Michael Darbyshire, 62, English actor (Rentaghost).
- Jimmy Deagan, 81, Australian footballer.
- Percy Evans, 73, Australian footballer.
- Johnny Gildea, 69, American football player.
- Sir Alfred Hall-Davis, 55, British politician, MP (1964–1979).
- Laurence Irving, 84, American physiologist.
- David Johns, 58, English cricketer.
- Einari Karvetti, 82, Finnish politician.
- Harold Leventhal, 64, American judge, heart attack.
- Tyra Lundgren, 82, Swedish artist.
- Josef Oberhauser, 64, German Nazi official and war criminal.
- Rolf Østbye, 81, Norwegian businessman.
- Arthur Perrow, 78, Welsh diver.
- D. C. Riddy, 72, British linguist.
- Jean Snella, 64, French football player and manager.
- Bobby Trapp, 81, Canadian ice hockey player.
- Charles Fremont West, 80, American track athlete and football player and coach, cancer.
- Pierre Wuilleumier, 75, French historian and literary scholar.

=== 21 ===
- Maurizio Arena, 45, Italian actor, heart attack.
- Katherine Balderston, 84, American literary scholar.
- Marie Byles, 79, Australian conservationist and writer.
- Peter Craigmyle, 85, Scottish football referee.
- Vivian Gibbins, 78, English footballer.
- Emmanuel Gonat, 60, French Olympic field hockey player (1936).
- Asja Lācis, 88, Latvian actress and theatre director.
- Marcel Langsam, 88, Luxembourgish Olympic gymnast (1912).
- Red Dog, c. 8, Australian dog known for traveling, strychnine poisoning.
- Sir Edgar Tanner, 75, Australian sports administrator and politician.
- Paul Wexler, 50, American actor, leukemia.

=== 22 ===
- Helen Binyon, 74, British artist and writer.
- Frans de Bruijn Kops, 93, Dutch footballer and Olympian (1908).
- Percy Dockrell, 64, Irish politician, TD (1951–1957, 1961–1977).
- George Froeschel, 88, Austrian-American screenwriter (Mrs. Miniver) and novelist.
- Harry Jackman, 79, Canadian politician, MP (1940–1949).
- Roberte Ponsonby, Countess of Bessborough, 87, French-English aristocrat.
- Arthur Poole, 72, English cricketer.
- Irina Saburova, 72, Russian-German writer.
- Anne Vondeling, 63, Dutch politician, MEP (since 1979), traffic collision.

=== 23 ===
- Sir Robert Alford, 75, British colonial administrator.
- Colin Cherry, 65, English cognitive scientist.
- Henry Coker, 59, American jazz trombonist.
- Bernard Hoffman, 66, American photographer, amyotrophic lateral sclerosis.
- Nicholas Hryhorczuk, 90, Austro-Hungarian-born Canadian politician.
- Aurelio Menegazzi, 79, Italian Olympic racing cyclist (1924).
- Harry Monk, 77, Canadian curler.
- Merle Oberon, 68, British actress (The Dark Angel, Wuthering Heights, The Private Life of Henry VIII), stroke.
- Charles E. Potter, 63, American politician, member of the U.S. House of Representatives (1947–1952) and Senate (1952–1959).
- Richard Rovere, 64, American political journalist, emphysema.
- Fred Sgambati, 58, Canadian sports broadcaster, cancer.
- Judee Sill, 35, American singer and songwriter, drug overdose.
- Harry P. Van Guilder, 89, American politician, member of the Wisconsin State Assembly (1937–1942).

=== 24 ===
- Jean-Mohammed Abd-el-Jalil, 75, Moroccan Catholic priest.
- Gösta Andersson, 61, Swedish skier.
- Reg Armstrong, 51, Irish racing cyclist, traffic collision.
- Lily Beaurepaire, 87, Australian Olympic swimmer (1920).
- Pieter Belmer, 87, Dutch Olympic weightlifter (1920).
- Charles Berg, 67–68, German-English rabbi.
- John Robert Cartwright, 84, Canadian judge, chief justice (1967–1970).
- Fleeta Drumgo, 33, American convict, shot.
- Jo Eshuijs, 94, Dutch footballer.
- Ralph Greenson, 68, American psychiatrist.
- Tom Hanley, 63, American trade unionist and mobster.
- Alfred Kneschke, 77, German mathematician and engineer.
- Gerard Kroone, 82, Dutch chess player.
- Jim May, 69, Australian footballer.
- Hans Nachtsheim, 89, German geneticist.
- Mary Elizabeth Pidgeon, 89, American economist and suffragist, heart attack.
- Pen Reynolds, 87, Australian footballer.
- Erich Wiese, 88, German art director and museum director.
- Edith Williams, 80, Canadian veterinarian, stroke.
- Richard Q. Yardley, 76, American cartoonist.

=== 25 ===
- Elbert Andrews, 77, American baseball player and politician.
- Ky Ebright, 85, American rowing coach.
- Reo Fortune, 76, New Zealand-born British anthropologist.
- Hermann Gehri, 80, Swiss Olympic wrestler (1924).
- Walter J. Kozloski, 44, American politician, member of the New Jersey General Assembly (since 1974).
- Robert Alexander MacKay, 85, Canadian diplomat and political scientist.
- William Murphy, 76, Irish Olympic boxer (1924, 1928).
- Jack Rocchi, 74, Australian footballer.
- Bauke Roolvink, 67, Dutch politician.
- Leon Sash, 57, American jazz accordionist, heart disease.

=== 26 ===
- Harry Clifton, 71, British film producer and poet.
- George James Cole, Baron Cole, 73, British businessman.
- Marcel L'Herbier, 91, French filmmaker.
- Conny Méndez, 81, Venezuelan composer, singer and actress.
- Binyamin Shahor, 62–63, Israeli politician, MK (1959–1974).
- Ted Toohey, 53, English rugby player.

=== 27 ===
- Michael J. Bradley, 82, American politician, member of the U.S. House of Representatives (1937–1947).
- Leo Brewster, 76, American judge.
- Jerome Cavanagh, 51, American politician, mayor of Detroit (1962–1970), heart attack.
- Walter Dietrich, 76, Swiss footballer.
- Milton Lorman, 52, American politician, member of the Wisconsin State Assembly (since 1977), heart attack.
- Jahanara Shahnawaz, 83, Pakistani politician.
- Dona Dumitru Siminică, 53, Romanian violinist, heart attack.
- Albert Thain, 79, English footballer.
- Mary Varallo, 82, American politician, member of the Pennsylvania House of Representatives (1945–1946, 1949–1960).

=== 28 ===
- Sohail Azimabadi, 68, Indian novelist and poet.
- Arnold L. Bjorklund, 61, American soldier.
- Herb Bremer, 66, American baseball player.
- Henri Heim de Balsac, 80, French zoologist.
- Nelly Degouy, 69, Belgian painter.
- Stanley Victor Keeling, 85, British philosopher.
- Edy Knupfer, 67, Swiss architect.
- Norman Macdonnell, 63, American radio, film and television producer (Gunsmoke), kidney failure.
- Francesco Menzio, 80, Italian painter.
- Peter Mulgrew, 52, New Zealand mountaineer and businessman, plane crash.
- Grace Olivier Peck, 81, American politician, member of the Oregon House of Representatives (1948–1950, 1957–1977), stroke.

=== 29 ===
- Stan Amour, 79, Australian politician.
- Jean Cabassu, 77, French footballer.
- James Cooper, 79, Canadian politician.
- Thomas Egan, 73, Australian cricketer.
- Hovey Freeman, 47, Puerto Rican Olympic sailor (1968, 1972, 1976).
- Philoumenos Hasapis, 66, Cypriot Greek Orthodox prelate, axe murder.
- Alan Knight, 74–75, Guyanese Anglican prelate.
- Guram Kutateladze, 55, Soviet Georgian painter.
- Erich Schönhardt, 88, German mathematician.
- Ray Smith, 45, American rockabilly musician, suicide.
- Josef Urválek, 69, Czech judge.
- Rudolf van Reest, 82, Dutch novelist.

=== 30 ===
- Barbara von Annenkoff, 79, Russian-born German actress.
- Arno Assmann, 71, German filmmaker, suicide.
- Kathleen Crofton, 76, English ballet dancer and choreographer, heart attack.
- Gabrielle Dorziat, 99, French actress.
- Walter John Elliot, 65, Canadian public health official.
- Laura Gilpin, 88, American photographer.
- Joyce Grenfell, 69, English actress and singer.
- Dick Huemer, 81, American animator (Scrappy).
- Albert Iles, 65, English footballer.
- Pedro Lazaga, 61, Spanish filmmaker.
- Zeppo Marx, 78, American comedian (The Marx Brothers) and actor, lung cancer.
- Olavi Saarinen, 56, Finnish politician.
- Emile Severeyns, 48, Belgian racing cyclist.
- Bert Smedley, 74, Australian footballer.
