= Nieuwenkamp =

Nieuwenkamp is a Dutch surname. Notable people with the surname include:

- W. O. J. Nieuwenkamp (1874–1950), Dutch artist, writer, and ethnologist
- Willem Nieuwenkamp (1903–1979), Dutch geologist
