= Regent's Park Open Air Theatre =

Outdoor theatre company in London, England

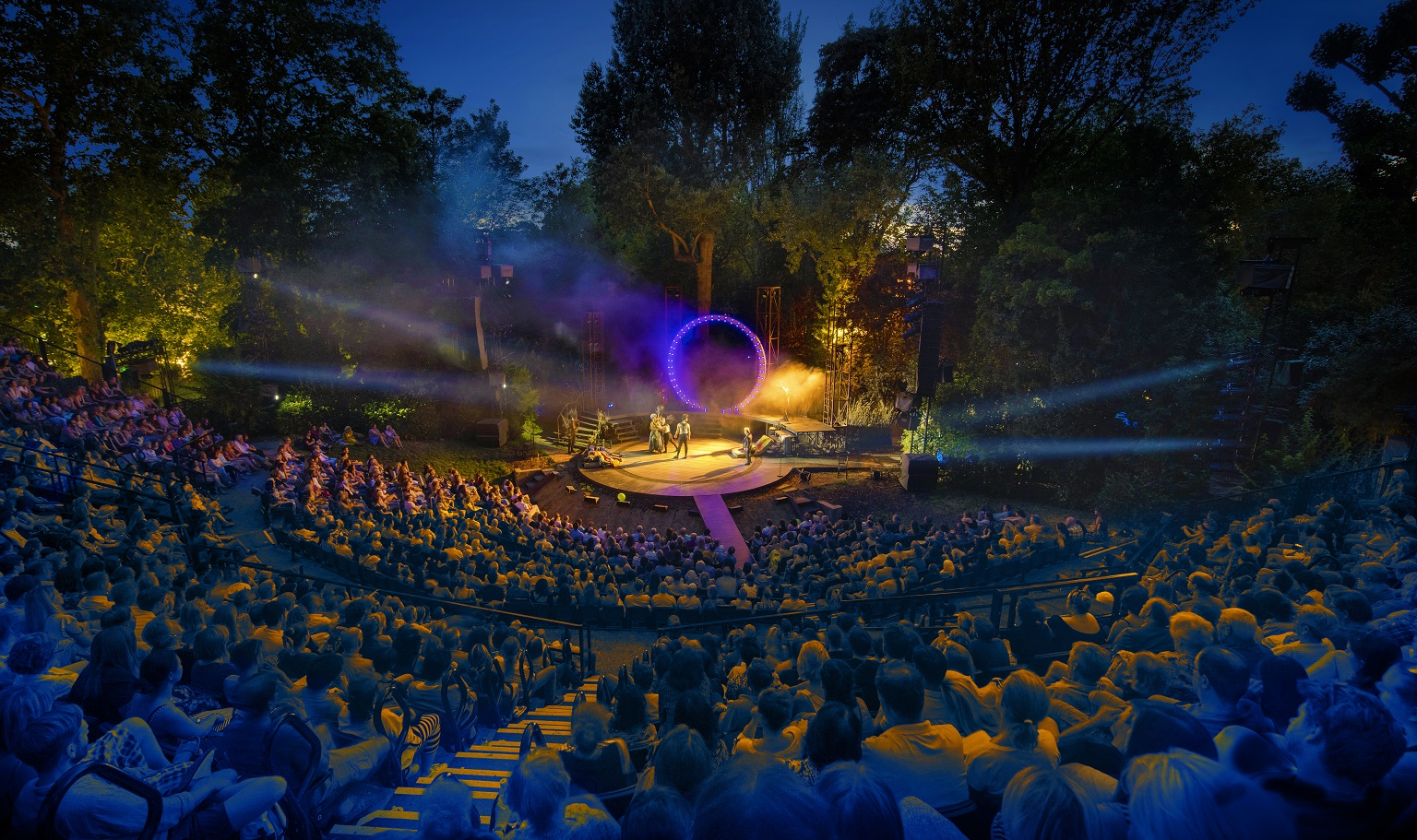
- Interactive map of Regent's Park Open Air Theatre
- Address: Inner Circle; London, NW1; United Kingdom
- Coordinates: 51.529°N 0.155°W
- Owner: Regent's Park Theatre Ltd.
- Capacity: 1,304 seats
- Type: Open-air theatre, with resident company
- Production: Summer repertory
- Public transit: Baker Street

Construction
- Opened: 1932; 94 years ago
- Rebuilt: 1999

Website
- openairtheatre.com

Regent's Park Open Air Theatre is an open-air theatre in Regent's Park in central London, established in 1932. Originally known for its Shakespearean productions, the theatre now features a wide variety of performances, including musicals, operas and plays simplified for children

== The theatre ==
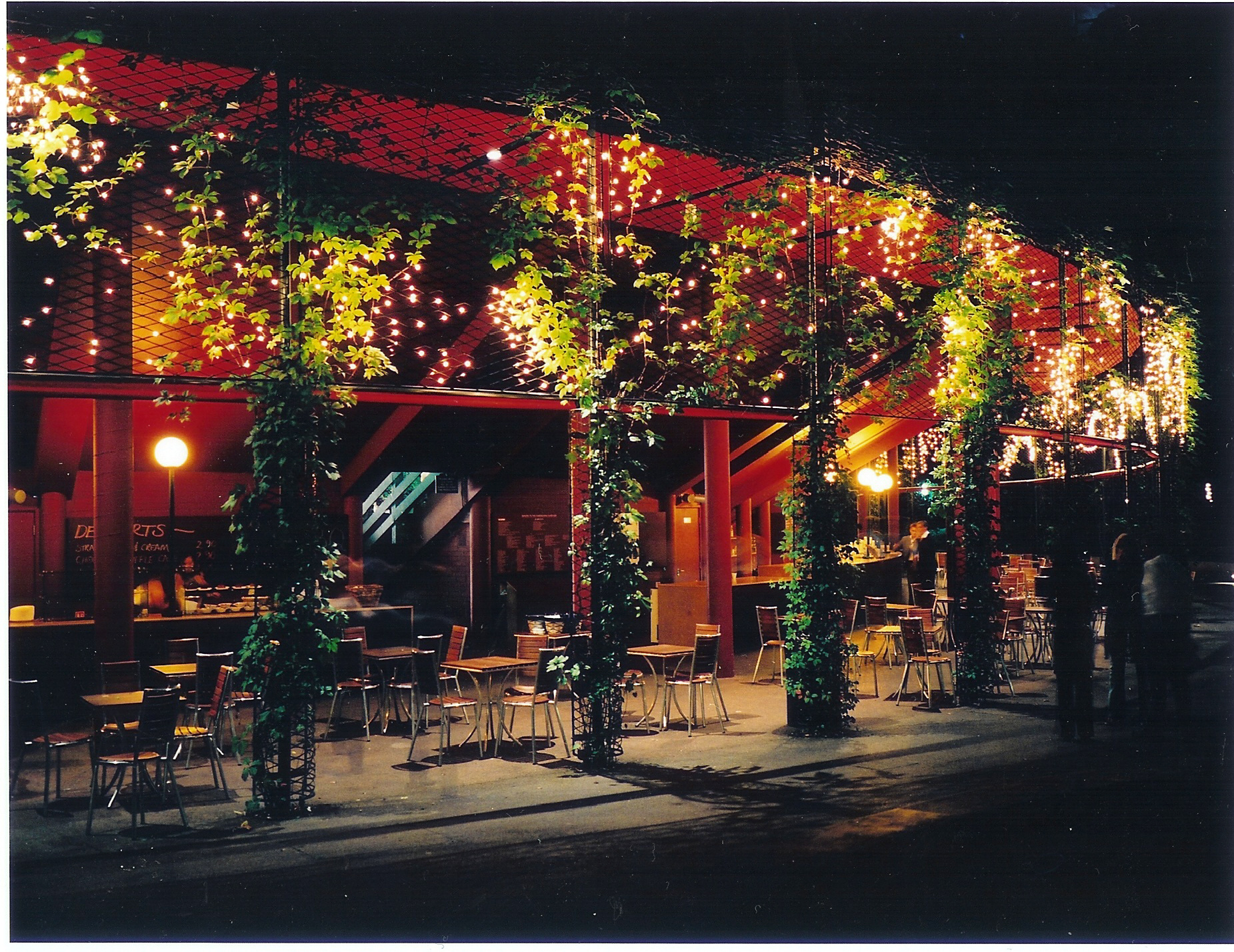
Open Air Theatre Bar, at night

Established in 1932, Regent’s Park Open Air Theatre is one of the largest theatres in London, with 1,304 seats. It is situated in Queen Mary’s Gardens in Regent’s Park, one of London’s Royal Parks. The theatre’s annual 18-week season is attended by more than 140,000 people each year. In 2017, the theatre was named London Theatre of the Year in The Stage Awards, and received the Highly Commended Award for London Theatre of the Year in 2021.

Many famous people have performed at the theatre. One of the first was in 1936 when Vivien Leigh played Anne Boleyn in Henry VIII, three years before she found fame in Gone with the Wind. Subsequent actors and actresses include Anna Neagle, Eileen Atkins, Bernard Bresslaw, Jeremy Irons, Michael Gambon, Kate O’Mara, Lesley Garrett, Richard E. Grant, Ralph Fiennes, Hugh Bonneville, Damian Lewis, Benedict Cumberbatch, and Sheridan Smith. Judi Dench, who has had a long relationship with the theatre, is currently Patron.

The Open Air Theatre's 2026 season includes the world premiere of Sherlock Holmes, a new mystery by Joel Horwood; A Life in Four Seasons, Vivaldi's masterpiece reimagined in an electric new dance work; William Shakespeare's A Midsummer Night's Dream; a brand-new production of Andrew Lloyd Webber's CATS; and Anansi the Spider by Justin Audibert in a Unicorn Theatre and Regent's Park Open Air Theatre production. 2026 also sees the return of Family Takeover Day, Live Music Week, and various artist development programmes.

== History ==
In 1932, the New Theatre (now the Noël Coward Theatre) was left without a show after the early closure of a play by Benito Mussolini. Producer Robert Atkins and theatre critic Sydney Carroll presented a ‘black and white’ production of Twelfth Night which subsequently transferred to a makeshift theatre in Regent's Park, thus establishing Regent’s Park Open Air Theatre.

The first full season, in 1933, included a revival of the previous year’s Twelfth Night and the first of the theatre's almost 50 productions of A Midsummer Night’s Dream.

In 1939, Regent’s Park Open Air Theatre and the Windmill Theatre were the only two theatres to remain open throughout World War II.

In 1963, actors and directors David Conville and David William established the New Shakespeare Company as a non-profit distributing company with distinguished actor and director Laurence Olivier as one of the key investors. Conville remained associated with the theatre for 50 years and, following his death in 2018, artist Lee Simmons was commissioned to design a sculpture for the theatre grounds.

The theatre’s current fixed amphitheatre-style auditorium was constructed in 1974 and has had subsequent refurbishments.

The theatre’s first original musical, Bashville, was performed in 1983. Notable productions in the theatre’s history include a gala performance in 2002 for the Queen's Golden Jubilee (attended by The Queen and The Duke of Edinburgh).

In 2008, A Midsummer Night’s Dream re-imagined for everyone aged six and over was the first ‘re-imagined’ production at the venue especially created for children. This was followed by various subsequent ‘re-imagined’ titles including Macbeth (2010) Pericles (2011), and Oliver Twist (2017).

The New Shakespeare Company became Regents Park Theatre Ltd in 2010, in light of the move away from producing Shakespeare-only plays. In 2015, the theatre launched a digital archive to enable audiences to explore all of the productions across its history. The archive continues to be updated.

In 2018, the venue co-produced its first opera with English National Opera, The Turn of the Screw. This partnership led to the 2019 production of Humperdinck’s Hansel and Gretel which included an ensemble of children from the Pimlico Musical Foundation.

In 2020, Regent’s Park Open Air Theatre was the first to open during the coronavirus pandemic with a socially distanced production of Jesus Christ Superstar: The Concert.

== Awards ==
| Date | Production | Award |
|---|---|---|
| 1983 | As You Like It | Actress of the Year in a Supporting Role, Laurence Olivier Awards (Abigail McKern) |
| 1991 | The Boys From Syracuse | Best Musical Revival, Laurence Olivier Awards; Best Supporting Actress in a Musical, Laurence Olivier Awards (Jenny Galloway) |
| 2009 | Hello, Dolly! | Best Musical Revival, Laurence Olivier Awards; Best Actress in a Musical, Laurence Olivier Awards (Samantha Spiro); Best Theatre Choreography, Laurence Olivier Awards (Stephen Mear); Best Musical, Evening Standard Awards |
| 2010 | Into The Woods | Best Musical Revival, Laurence Olivier Awards; Director of the Year†, WhatsOnStage Awards (Timothy Sheader) |
| 2011 | Crazy For You | Best Musical Revival, Laurence Olivier Awards; Best Costume Design, Laurence Olivier Awards (Peter McKintosh) |
| 2013 | The Sound of Music | Best Musical Revival, WhatsOnStage Awards |
| 2013 | To Kill a Mockingbird | Best Play Revival WhatsOnStage Awards |
| 2016 | Jesus Christ Superstar | Best Musical Revival, Laurence Olivier Awards; Best Musical, Evening Standard Awards; Emerging Talent, Evening Standard Awards (Tyrone Huntley) |
| 2017 | On The Town | Best Actress in a Musical, The Stage Debut Awards (Miriam-Teak Lee) |
| 2018 | Little Shop of Horrors | Best Musical Revival, WhatsOnStage Awards; Best Set Design, WhatsOnStage Awards (Tom Scutt); Best Stage Poster, WhatsOnStage Awards (FEAST Creative); Best Off West End Show, West End Wilma Awards |
| 2019 | Jesus Christ Superstar (Barbican) | Best Supporting Male Actor in a Musical, Black British Theatre Awards (Cavin Cornwall) |
| 2019 | Evita | Best Musical, Evening Standard Awards; Best Director, Critics Circle Awards (Jamie Lloyd); Best Direction, WhatsOnStage Awards (Jamie Lloyd) |
| 2024 | Dinosaur World Live | Best Family Show, Laurence Olivier Awards |
| 2025 | Fiddler on the Roof | Best Musical Revival, Laurence Olivier Awards; Best Set Design, Laurence Olivier Awards (Tom Scutt); Best Sound Design, Laurence Olivier Awards (Nick Lidster) |

†also for The Crucible

== Beyond the park ==
Various Open Air Theatre productions have gone on to be presented beyond the theatre itself. The first overseas transfer was of the 1956 productions of Hamlet and Twelfth Night when the theatre was invited to perform at the Baalbek Festival in Lebanon. In 2011, Crazy For You transferred to the West End’s Novello Theatre and, the following year, Sheader and director Liam Steel re-directed their 2010 production of Into The Woods in Central Park, New York for The Public Theater.

Productions that have toured the UK following seasons at the Open Air Theatre include: The Pirates of Penzance, High Society, To Kill A Mockingbird (also a month-long residency at the Barbican Centre), Lord of the Flies, Running Wild and Pride and Prejudice.

The most widely seen production from Regent’s Park Open Air Theatre is the 2016 production of Jesus Christ Superstar. After a second sell-out season in 2017, the production played a limited engagement at the Lyric Opera of Chicago in 2018 before transferring to the Barbican in 2019. The show has since toured North America, the UK and Ireland and Australia. The production transferred to the London Palladium and Theatre Royal, Drury Lane in 2026 starring Sam Ryder as Jesus with numerous star casting playing King Herod including Jesse Tyler Ferguson, Richard Armitage, Rob Brydon, Michael Ball and Glenn Close.

In 2025, the 2024 production of Fiddler on the Roof was transferred to the Barbican Centre in the summer before embarking on a UK and Ireland tour and an Australian tour.

== Management ==
| Period | Management |
|---|---|
| 1932-1939 | Sydney Carroll, Impresario; Robert Atkins, Artistic Director |
| 1940-1961 | Robert Atkins, Artistic & Managing Director |
| 1962-1966 | David Conville, Managing Director; David William, Artistic Director |
| 1967-1973 | David Conville, Managing Director; Richard Digby Day, Artistic Director |
| 1974-1976 | David Conville, Managing Director; Mervyn Willis, Artistic Director |
| 1977-1986 | David Conville, Artistic & Managing Director |
| 1987-2007 | Ian Talbot, Artistic & Managing Director |
| 2008-2021 | William Village, Executive Director; Timothy Sheader, Artistic Director |
| 2021–2023 | James Pidgeon, Executive Director; Timothy Sheader, Artistic Director |
| 2024-present | James Pidgeon, Executive Director; Drew McOnie, Artistic Director |
