= Lake Borobudur =

Former lake in Central Java

Coordinates: 7.607°S 110.202°E

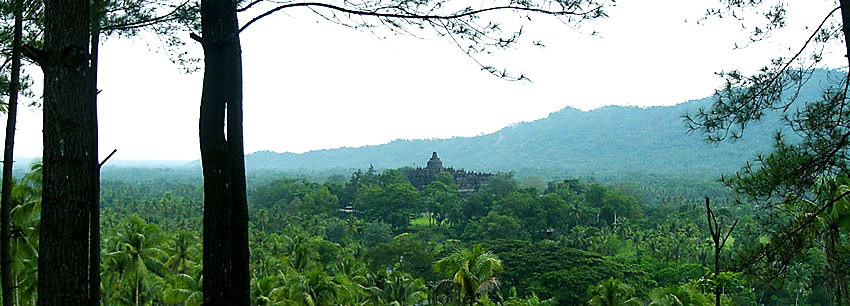
The ancient lake existed on the lower plains around Borobudur.

Lake Borobudur is an ancient lake that has been suggested once existed surrounding Borobudur Buddhist monument in Kedu Plain, Central Java, Indonesia.

Unlike other temples, which were built on a flat surface, Borobudur was built on a bedrock hill, 265 m (869 ft) above sea level and 15 m (49 ft) above the floor of the dried-out paleolake. The lake's existence had been the subject of intense discussion among archaeologists in the 20th century; Borobudur was thought to have been built on a lake shore or even surrounded by a lake.

== Nieuwenkamp's proposition ==
In 1931, a Dutch artist and scholar of Hindu and Buddhist architecture, W.O.J. Nieuwenkamp, developed a theory that Kedu Plain was once a lake and Borobudur initially represented a lotus flower floating on the lake. Lotus flowers are found in almost every Buddhist work of art, often serving as a throne for buddhas and base for stupas. The architecture of Borobudur itself suggests a lotus depiction, in which Buddha postures in Borobudur symbolize the Lotus Sutra, mostly found in many Mahayana Buddhism (a school of Buddhism widely spread in the east Asia region) texts. Three circular platforms on the top are also thought to represent a lotus petals.

Nieuwenkamp has suggested that the landscape near Borobudur included lakes, and that the temples were arranged around these lakes in form of flowers and mathematical patterns considered to be auspicious, and that the temples were connected by paved brick roads lined by walls. These lakes and roads were later filled with metres of volcanic ash from the multiple eruptions of Mount Merapi, which lies very closely to the east of the area.

Nieuwenkamp's theory, however, was contested by many archaeologists, such as Dumarçay and Soekmono, arguing the natural environment surrounding the monument was dry land. This theory is controversial, but recent geological evidence supports Nieuwenkamp proposal.

== Palynological investigation and geomorphology analysis ==
Dumarçay together with Professor Thanikaimoni had taken soil samples in 1974 and again in 1977 from trial trenches that had been dug into the hill, as well as from the plain immediately to the south. These samples were later analysed by Professor Thanikaimoni, who examined their pollen and spore content in order to identify the type of vegetation that had grown in the area around the time of Borobudur's construction. They were unable to discover any pollen or spore samples that were characteristic of any vegetation known to grow in an aquatic environment. The area surrounding Borobudur appears to have been surrounded by agricultural land and palm trees at the time of the monument's construction, as is still the case today.

Caesar Voûte and the geomorphologist Dr J.J. Nossin in 1985–86 field studies re-examined the Borobudur lake hypothesis and concluded the absence of a lake around Borobudur at the time of its construction and active use as a sanctuary.

These findings were endorsed by UNESCO in A New Perspective on Some Old Questions Pertaining to Borobudur compiled within the 2005 UNESCO publication titled "The Restoration of Borobudur".

== Geological findings ==
In 2000s, geologists, on the other hand, support Nieuwenkamp's view, pointing out clay sediments found near the site. A study of stratigraphy, sediment and pollen samples conducted in 2000 supports the existence of a paleolake environment near Borobudur, which tends to confirm Nieuwenkamp's theory.

The lake area fluctuated with time and the study also proves that Borobudur was near the lake shore c. 13th and 14th centuries. River flows and volcanic activities shape the surrounding landscape, including the lake. One of the most active volcanoes in Indonesia, Mount Merapi's has been very active since the Pleistocene.

== Conclusion ==
The location Borobudur surroundings, the ancient lake as suggested once located in south-southeast from Borobudur, and probably south from Mendut temple on Progo and Elo rivers confluence.

To reconcile among these findings, it seems that there was once a lake near Borobudur during its construction and at the time of its initial active use in the 9th century. However contrary to Nieuwenkamp's theory — of Borobudur as a blossoming lotus in the center of the pond — the lake was not surrounding the whole Borobudur of the bedrock hill completely, but just some small sections of it.

It might be possible that the lower parts of the Kedu plains surrounding Borobudur near the river, was once naturally flooded and created a small shallow lake for at least until 13th to 14th century. The nearest portion of this elongated lake was estimated to be located around 500 metres south from Borobudur along the small river that drained to the southeast where it joins the Progo river. The lake just flooded the lower portion of the valley located in south and southeast from the temple, while the east, west and northern sides are dry lands probably cultivated as rice paddies, orchards and palm trees just like today. There were probably other lakes located several hundred metres south from Mendut temple on Progo and Elo rivers confluence, and north from Pawon temple along Progo river. These lakes existed until the 13th to 14th centuries, when Merapi's volcanic activity, collapsed the natural dam barrier and finally drained the lake.
