= David Conville =

British actor and director (1929–2018)

David Henry Conville OBE (4 June 1929 – 24 November 2018) was a British actor and director at the Regent's Park Open Air Theatre.

He was the son of Lt. Col. Leopold Conville who farmed in Sahiwal Punjab on land that is now in Pakistan. He was married to Philippa Gail from 1970 till her death in 1999.

== Filmography ==
Year	Title	Role	Notes
1954	Diplomatic Passport	Airline Clerk	Uncredited
1959	The Night We Dropped a Clanger	2nd Navigator	
1961	The Curse of the Werewolf	Rico Gomez	
1962	A Prize of Arms	Capt. James	Uncredited
1964	The Evil of Frankenstein	Policeman #2	
1986	Clockwise	Headmaster	
1987	The Fourth Protocol	Bursham	
