= Gregor Krause =

German-Dutch physician and amateur photographer (1883–1959)

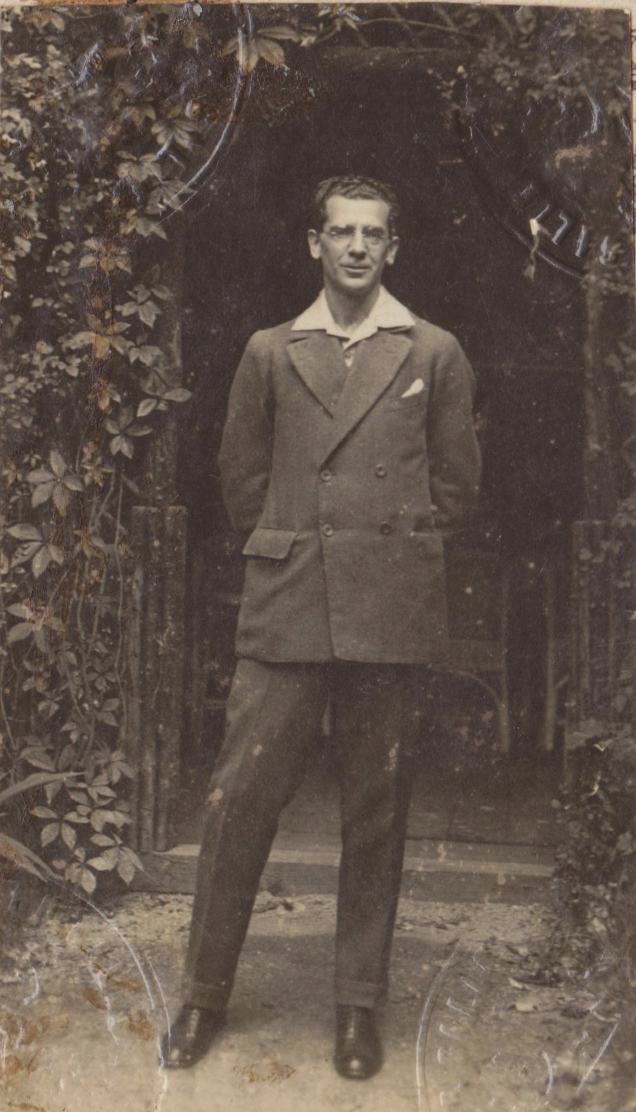
- Born: 6 March 1883; Insterburg, Chernyakhovsk, Russia, former East Prussia
- Died: 25 August 1959 (aged 76); Dalfsen, the Netherlands
- Resting place: cremated
- Known for: photography, photobooks
- Notable work: book Insel Bali (1920) Borneo (1926)
- Style: documentary
- Spouse: Anna Margaretha Wilhelmina Bachmann
- Children: Lay Song Schutte-Tan, Sioekie Kroes-Li
- Parents: Heinrich Krause (father); Maria Foetkenheuer (mother)

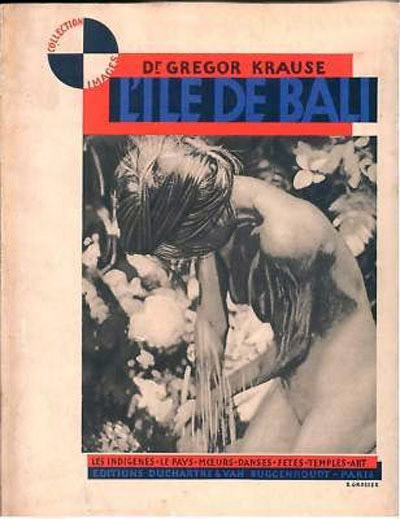
Gregor Krause L’Ile de Bali 1930

Gregor Krause (6 March 1883 – 25 August 1959) was a German physician (GP) and amateur photographer, active in Indonesia in the first decades of the 20th century. He published two photographic books: Insel Bali (1920), reprinted in 1922 and 1926. A French edition appeared in 1930. The portfolio Borneo was published in 1926. Krause provided extensive texts to accompany his photographs and over twenty illustrated articles on Bali and Borneo in the Dutch magazine Nederlandsch-Indië Oud & Nieuw as well as articles in Eigen Haard a popular Dutch illustrated magazine and other magazines.

Krause became internationally famous because of his photobooks on Bali. His pictures showed an enchanted nature, a pristine island and a harmonious way of life, in which religion and art were an integral part of daily life. The first edition of his photobook Insel Bali consisted of two parts, containing pictures of the countryside, farming life, markets, religious festivals, dances and cremation ceremonies.

The Bali books had extensive informative texts by Krause. Both his pictures of Balinese nudes, women and men bathing, and of cremation ceremonies, attracted attention. For the 1910s-20s Krause was ahead of his time as a modern documentary photographer, photojournalist and in his environmental concerns. His vibrant and sequential images were taken within living communities and recorded unstaged ceremonies. The exotic content attracted more attention than his reports on customs and culture. The books initially served more as an impetus for tourism to Bali than for further ethnographic study.

The Borneo portfolio in three folders shows 36 sequential images of monkeys that are like portraits, and atmospheric pictures of the lush tidal forest of Borneo.

== Early life and education ==
Krause was born 6 March 1883 Insterburg, East Prussia (now Chernyakhovsk, Russia) the son of Heinrich Krause and Maria Foetkenheuer Anna Wilhelmina Margaretha Bachmann. He was raised with two sisters in a Roman Catholic family. High culture played an important part of his education. The family enjoyed classical music and literature. During the second phase of his youth the family lived in Allenstein in Mazuria, now Poland. Krause spent much time in the woods and around the lakes. He had to choose between a training as a medical doctor or a priest. He had uncles in both professions.

Krause studied medicine in Koningsbergen (Königsberg, nowadays Kaliniengrad, Russia), then moved to Berlin around 1906 where he worked as intern in an accident clinic. In 1908 he graduated in Hamburg.

== Career ==
Krause became a ship’s doctor and sailed to the West Indies. He considered working at a leprosy clinic in Curaçao. Back in Hamburg Krause contacted the Dutch consul about this plan, but was advised to engage as a military doctor in the Dutch East Indian Army (KNIL). By the end of 1911 he had arrived in Surabaya and worked there in the military hospital for several months, but the work was too dull for his liking. In August 1912 Krause went to a garrison in the market village of Bangli in Bali, and remained there until the end of 1913.

=== Bangli, Bali ===
Only a couple of years before Krause arrived, the last Dutch military raid took place in Bali. There was a military clinic in the garrison near the village of Bangli, which locals turned to for medical aid. Krause thought this situation undesirable due the risk of contamination in dealing with a cholera outbreak. The monarch of Bangli allowed him to establish a clinic on a square of the village. A building was erected with an examination room, operating theatre and two hospital wards. A Balinese colleague referred patients to Krause. Each day about 30 people attended his clinic.

During his stay, being their doctor, Krause learned about the Balinese. He studied their culture and language and realised after almost a year he wanted to depict Balinese life as objectively as possible. This made him decide to turn to photography as a documentary tool. It is not known if Krause had some prior instruction in photography or was self-taught.

Krause wandered about Bangli village, photographing at the market place and in the streets. While joining in the daily bathing in the open air, he photographed the bathers as he recalled almost unnoticed. He photographed in the countryside, depicting farmers at work. He also took a camera along on military patrols through the region, where he spoke before desa (village) parliaments, giving medical information on how to prevent dysentery. A great many religious festivals and about 40 cremation ceremonies were attended. Balinese art and architecture were also of interest.

With a small camera he made about 4000 pictures, many being stereoscopic. He did not include any images of his work as a doctor in a Military unit in his published images. Some family images are held by the Nederlands FotoMuseum collection.

=== After Bali ===
Krause left the army and met his Dutch wife. He was employed as civil servant by the Dutch government for their pest control campaign in Java, in which he served from 1914 up to 1916.

During the First World War he was summoned to return to Germany to join the army. However, he was arrested during his journey back to Europe at a stop in Durban, South Africa. From there he was transferred to a prisoner of war camp near London.

Back in the Netherlands Krause gave lectures, each time showing about 100 lantern slides. He spoke (in German) for artists associations Pulchri Studio in the Hague and Arti et Amicitiae in Amsterdam, as well as for members of amateur photography societies and subscribers of the photographic magazine Focus. Krause never joined a photography society nor took part in their photography salons.

He lectured before a range of audiences, including members of the association ‘Oost en West’ for people about to work or having lived in the Dutch East Indies. The secretary of that association, L.D. Petit, held lectures throughout the Netherlands on his behalf when Krause was back in Indonesia. Krause himself also spoke to medical students, Indonesian students in the Netherlands, and craftsmen such as goldsmiths.

Between 1917 and 1933 Krause published more than 20 illustrated articles on Bali and Borneo in the magazine Nederlandsch-Indië Oud & Nieuw, a monthly about architecture, arts and crafts, ethnology etc., published by architect Eduard Cuypers. Cuypers, precursor of the architectural style the Amsterdamse School, was also publisher of the magazine Het Nederlandsche en Nederlandsch Indische Huis Oud & Nieuw on architecture in the Dutch East Indies.

Krause wrote on Balinese art in the daily newspaper Nieuwe Rotterdamsche Courant (NRC), on hygiene among the Balinese in the medical magazine Janus and on Balinese dances in Wendingen, a monthly for arts and architecture.

From 14 to 28 February 1917 the exhibition ‘Bali in Beeld’ was held at Arti et Amicitiae, the building of the artists association in the centre of Amsterdam. It was organised in cooperation with the magazine Nederlands Indië Oud & Nieuw. Apart from Krause’s pictures, (copies of) drawings by the Dutch artist W.O.J. Nieuwenkamp and paintings by the American artist Maurice Sterne were shown. Along with smaller black and white prints a selection of enlarged pictorial prints in matte grey and warm brown shades was shown. These were made by a ‘well known Amsterdam based photographer’, probably Alex Bratsch. Architect Eduard Cuypers commissioned Bratsch on a regular basis to document buildings designed by him.

The expo was covered extensively by the press and reviewed very well. Due to its success it was prolonged until 7^{th} March. Krause’s prints had previously been shown at Pulchri Studio in The Hague, just for one day. Also in 1917 the prints were shown in Leeuwarden, in Amsterdam again and in Rotterdam. A couple of years later they were on show at the Stedelijk Museum, Amsterdam (1921) and in the Colonial Museum in Amsterdam (1923).

In the Netherlands Krause had to study medicine again and in 1919 got his Dutch degree in Leiden. He befriended Dutch painters like Charley Toorop, member of the famous Dutch art movement Bergense School, the poets Adriaan Roland Holst and Henriëtte Roland Holst and novelist Augusta de Wit. She gave lectures on Bali using Krause’s slides.

=== Insel Bali ===
In 1920 Insel Bali was published by Folkwang Verlag, Hagen, Germany. Art historian Karl With, the author of the introduction, selected the 400 pictures for the two volumes, for Krause himself was working on Borneo for the Bataafsche Petroleum Maatschappij (BPM, later Shell).

Themes in the book were Land und Volk (volume I), Tänze, Tempel, Feste (volume II). The focus was environment, culture, the Dutch military, and civilian presence was not included. The books were distributed internationally and sold out within a year.

A second, abridged edition was also printed by Folkwang Verlag in 1922, again with a selection of pictures by Karl With, but only 207 images this time.

A third edition appeared in 1926, this time printed by Georg Muller Verlag of Munich. The latter was composed by Krause himself, as was the French edition of 1930, printed in Paris. All reprints consistied of one volume. Krause left out the pictures made by his friend Maurice Sterne.

=== Reception of Insel Bali ===
Insel Bali was published only two years after the ending of the First World War. The images were interpreted as showing an unspoiled paradise.

Painters like Isaac Israëls, Walter Spies, Rudolf Bonnet and Miguel Covarrubias, photographers like Hugo Bernatzik and Gotthard Schuh, writers and anthropologists were enticed to travel to Bali.

The pictures were considered to be artless, realistic and natural, without people posing for the pictures. Artists regularly compared the ‘simple lines’ of Krause’s pictures to the paintings Paul Gauguin made in Polynesia. The depicted bodies were compared to ‘living statues’.

Quotes and references from his books appeared in a diverse range of magazines; art magazines, journals of nudists, teetotallers and of socialist women. Compared to the lives of Western female labourers, often decrepit, Balinese women looked healthy and strong.

Upon publication the books were ignored by the German public. Only after the rumour had spread that they might be confiscated because of pornographic contents (the photos of people of both sexes bathing) it sold out very quickly as did the second edition.The dramatic cover of the French edition of Bali showed a naked female bather. Some audiences considered these pictures to be licentious.

In the early 20th century there was scant tourism in Bangli or Bali. People were deeply religious. Krause wrote: “[…] die Menschen dort so gut und schön and glucklich sind” (the people there are so good, beautiful and happy'. Common dress for both men and women was a sarong, with their torso nude. Communal bathing in the open air was a normal practice and Krause joined them daily. Being not only a doctor but also coming from Germany where the Freikörperkultur (a movement in which body and soul were harmonised through gymnastics, practised naked in nature) was en vogue, Krause will have experienced this as a natural practice. He admired Balinese hygiene.

In his writings and unpublished memoirs, Krause expressed his admiration for the Balinese culture and devout way of living. Due to his education he was a classicist, often referring as well to European writers like Dante and Goethe. The poses and shapes of the bodies of people, both of women and men, reminded him of ancient Greek and Egyptian sculptures. He was impressed by the strength of the upper arm muscles and shoulders of the market women, used to carrying heavy weights on their heads. Overlooking nature from a hill top, Krause referred to the emotion which Gothic cathedrals generate, namely a perfect illusion of endless height and width.

==== Style of photographing ====
Krause had no art training and was self taught as a photographer. His interest in documenting Balinese culture was the impetus to take up photography but he would have consulted photographic magazines for technical and aesthetic models. In the introductory to the 1930 French edition of Bali. “Je me suis placé au point de vue artistique” [I approached it from an artistic point of view] his interest in the classics was also an aspect of his artistic ideals.

Author Karl With and the publishing company Folkwang Verlag played a major part in the editing of Krause’s negatives. In his memoires With stated: “Most of them (stereoslides) were so blurred or out of focus they were unusable for reproduction and had to be discarded. In some instances, small details in a photo had to be cut out, put at a right angle and enlarged.” However, there remained enough negatives which could be reproduced without editing. Folkwang Verlag had a photo and diapositive centre where photographer Albert Renger Patzsch was employed, a famous German photographer of the German Neue Sachlichkeit.

The prints in the books are in high contrast, are clear and detailed, each composition stressing straight lines of poses, shapes, structures and movements depicted. The photos express the sense of situations and the character of people portrayed. His scenes of temple ceremonies for instance display serenity. The photos of the ‘fight for the corps’ during cremation ceremonies express intensity and ecstasy. Krause's determination to capture the drama and emotion of the scenes involved juggling the technical assessments of exposure times and practical demands of where to position himself is very unusual for an amateur as much as for ethnographic photography of the period. In their liveliness Krause's pictures of Balinese dances, anticipate the images in Henri Cartier-Bresson's 1954 book Les Danses a Bali. He regretted not having a movie camera at his disposal to record ceremonies and dances in sequence. Krause did not participate in photographic societies or salons these were in any case not available in Bali or Borneo

Krause's photobooks have been placed in some histories of photobooks but his contribution has had little attention from photohistorians. His relationship to Pictorialist art photography or the development of the documentary or photoessay format has not been studied.

=== Borneo ===
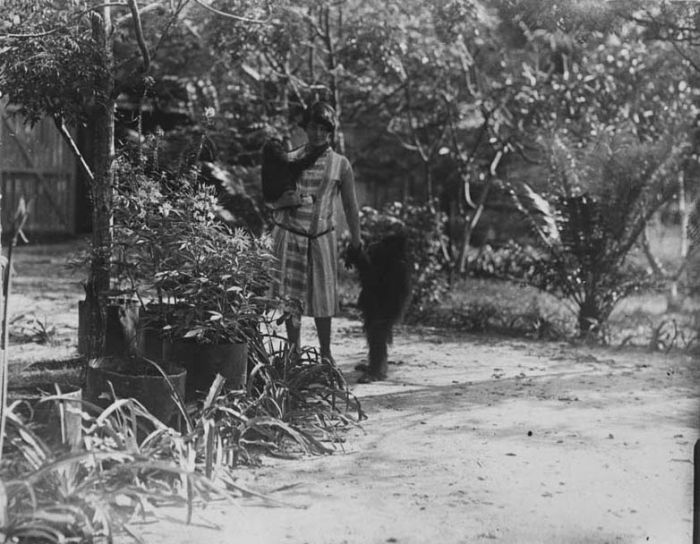
Gregor Krause photograph of Madam Krause with orangutangs in the couple's garden in Borneo

From 1919 up to 1928 Krause worked as a medical doctor at the company hospital of the Bataafsche Petroleum Maatschappij (BPM, later Shell) in Balikpapan. In their garden he and his wife held various animals; several dogs, parrots, chimpanzees and proboscis monkeys. They remained animal lovers for the rest of their lives.

On his Sundays off Krause took up photography again between 1920 and 1925, using a large plate camera and gelatin glass plates of 24 x 30 cm. Because of the twilight in the bush the negatives were exposed for about 30 minutes.

==== The portfolio Borneo ====
The portfolio Borneo was published in 1926, consisting of three parts: Einleitung (Introduction), Urwaldbilder (pictures of the jungle) and Affenbilder (pictures of monkeys). Each part containing 12 collotype plates 38.1 h x 30 w cm, presenting highly detailed images. Krause wrote the foreword of each part himself. Part I contains images of the harbour of Balikpapan and of Dayaks from the interior of Kalimantan, visiting Balikpapan. Part II shows a sequence from the beach, vegetation of the tidal mangrove into the giant trees of the rainforest. The portraits of monkeys are taken close-up and in sequential, intimately expressing their facial expressions and individual characters while interacting with each other.

Krause's portfolios attracted attention to the disastrous consequences of the deforestation and of the capture of monkeys for commercial purposes. Monkeys were sold, transported to Europa and often perished on route. His landscapes and detailed botanical photos of the rain forest show his ecological awareness.

The publication Borneo was praised by a reviewer in the Semarang De Locomotief of 2 April 1926 as 'the most wondrous, magnificent, and unforgettable images of tropical life that the Indies has ever known' and 'Here, the camera has become an instrument as fine, as striking, and as sensitive as the paintbrush.' The portfolio gained less public attention compared to the books on Bali. However, the portfolios were very appealing as large affordable prints and probably reached a wider audience than the Bali work.

==== After Borneo ====
Krause had to leave Borneo because of his health. For the next ten years he settled as a General Practitioner in Medan, Sumatera where he had a lot of Chinese patients. Krause and his wife adopted two girls there. Later on he established a private clinic Brastagi. He spoke Chinese and held a lifelong fascination and admiration for China and its culture. Krause revisited Bali several times and met Walter Spies and Rudolf Bonnet who became friends. Green, and Lindsey, suggest that 'Doctor Fabius' in Vicki Baum’s A Tale from Bali (1937) is based on Spies and Krause. In Sumatra Krause took a few pictures of Muslim and Chinese inhabitants. A Japanese photographer in Brastagi, probably of the firm Asahi & Co., made photographic postcards of his images, which Krause used to send over to his family in Germany.

During the Second World War the Krause family planned to flee to Java, because of attacks by locals due to Gregor’s German background. Once the Japanese occupied Indonesia, the family was interned, for Krause had been granted Dutch nationality in 1921. Krause spent almost a year in harsh conditions of Si Rengo Rengo, where the meagre diet was complemented with eating rats.

After the war the family moved to Australia, where they stayed in Sydney for a year. In 1947 the family returned to the Netherlands and settled in The Hague. Krause could no longer practice medicine in Indonesia, nor in the Netherlands, due to gossip and allegations circulating among the Dutch Indies society of the Hague. He gave up photography but every now and then gave lectures for artists' societies. He enjoyed life with his wife and 10 Afghan dogs in their old farm in Dalfsen, the Netherlands, where he was interviewed in February 1957. Krause died at Dalfsen on 25 August 1959.

== Legacy ==
After his death in 1959, Gregor Krause’s legacy was forgotten. The first English editions of Insel Bali, appeared in 1988 and 2000, arousing renewed interest in his work, Krause's Bali and Borneo publications and original prints were featured in the 2014 National Gallery of Australia survey exhibition and Garden of the East: photography in Indonesia 1850s-1940s with a catalogue essay Close-Up. Gregor Krause's Bali and Borneo by Dutch curator and photohistorian Anneke Groeneveld. Australian researcher and collector Scott Merrillees 2025 publication on historic photography in Bali devotes an entry to Gregor Krause. Since 2000 Indonesian scholars have also paid attention to Krause's body of work.

== Books by Gregor Krause ==
- Insel Bali, 2 volumes, Folkwang Verlag, 1920 text Karl With
- Bali, 1 volume, Folkwang Verlag, 1922 text Karl With
- Bali, 1 volume, Georg Müller Verlag, 1926 Text Karl With
- L’Ile de Bali, 1 volume, Editions Duchartre et Van Buggenhoudt, 1930
- Borneo, 3 portfolios, Georg Müller Verlag, 1926
- Bali, 1912 / photographs and reports by Gregor Krause, first published by Folkwang-Verlag GmbH Hagen, Germany, in two volumes in 1920, and in a one-volume condensed edition in 1922. Text Karl With.Translation of 1922 edition from German by W.H. Mabbett and design by Chua Ban Har, Wellington, N.Z.: January Books, 1988 ISBN 978-0-9597806-2-8 (hbk.)
- Krause, Gregor and Karl With, Bali: People and Art, White Lotus Books, Bangkok, 2000

== Photo-Archive ==
Nederlands Fotomuseum, collection Wereldmuseum Rotterdam

== Collections ==
- Bildarchiv Foto Marburg, Deutsches Dokumentationszentrum für Kunstgeschichte
- Wereldmuseum, Amsterdam
- Stedelijk Museum, Amsterdam
- Rijksmuseum, Amsterdam
- South and Southeast Asian photography, Leiden University Library
- National Gallery of Australia, Canberra

== Exhibitions ==
=== Solo ===
- 1917 Zuid Bali, Pulchri studio, the Hague
- 1917 Bali in Beeld, Arti et Amicitiae, Amsterdam
- 1917 Indisch Museum, in Princessehof, Amsterdam
- 1918 Kunst op Bali, Museum van Kunstnijverheid, Haarlem
- 1917-1918 (Ethnographic) Museum Willemskade, Rotterdam
- 2001 Paradijselijk Bali (reprints), Wereldmuseum Rotterdam

=== Group ===
- 1921 Tentoonstelling van Nederlandse en Nederlands-Indische boeken en tijdschriften (Indische Week), Stedelijk Museum, Amsterdam
- 1923 (Zilveren) Jubileumtentoonstelling, Koloniaal Museum, Amsterdam
- 1989 Toekang Potret, Museum voor Volkenkunde Rotterdam
- 2003 Rare Snuiters, Nieuwe Kerk, Amsterdam
- 2008 Picture Paradise: Asia-Pacific Photography 1840s-1940s National Gallery of Australia, Canberra
- 2014 Garden of the East: photography in Indonesia 1850s-1940s , National Gallery of Australia, Canberra
- 2015 De collectie belicht door Stephan Vanfleteren, Nederlands Fotomuseum, Rotterdam

== Bibliography ==
- H.W. Mabbett, Bali 1912, Photographs and reports by Gregor Krause, January Books, 1988 [reprint 2001]
- Anneke Groeneveld,'Gregor Krause’s Bali and Borneo' in Gael Newton [Ed.] Garden of the East: photography in Indonesia 1850s-1940s, National Gallery of Australia, 2014, pp.80-81.
- Merrillees, Scott (2025). Bali: photography 1865-1939. Jakarta: Afterhours Books. pp. 64–75. ISBN 978-602-6990-86-0.
- Bali people and art / Gregor Krause and Karl With ; translated by Walter E.J. Tips, Bangkok : White Lotus Press, 2000
- Julie A Sumerta, ‘Interpreting Balinese culture, representation and identity’, MA thesis, University of Waterloo, 2011.
- I Made Bayu Pramana, 'Rediscovering Touristic Photography In Bali; Gregor Krause As A Pioneer', conference paper, BALI-BHUWANA WASKITA (Global Art Creativity Conference) Vol1, Oktober 2021, Pramana Institut Seni Indonesia Denpasar 101Volume 1, Oktober 2021 https://eproceeding.isi-dps.ac.id/index.php/bbw
- Margaret Wiener, 'Breasts (Un)Dress, and Modernist Desires in the Balinese-Tourist Encounter',Dirt, Undress, and Difference, Indiana University Press, 2005 pp.30-35.

== Gallery of photographs by Gregor Krause ==
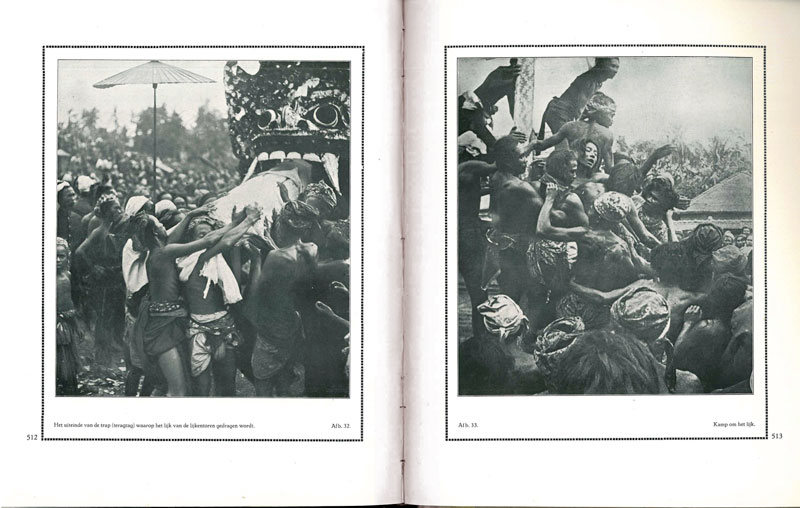
Gregor Krause 'Temple festival in South Bali' in Nederlandsch-Indie: Oud en Nieuw, July 1928

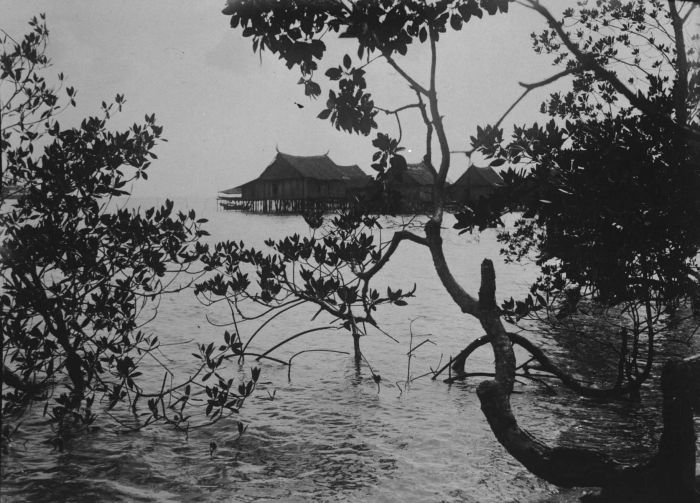
Stilt village along the southeast coast of Borneo

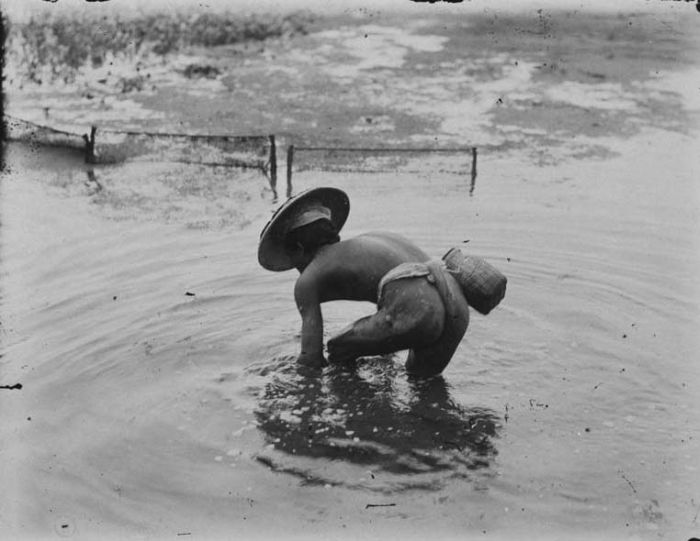
A crab fisherman at work in South Bali

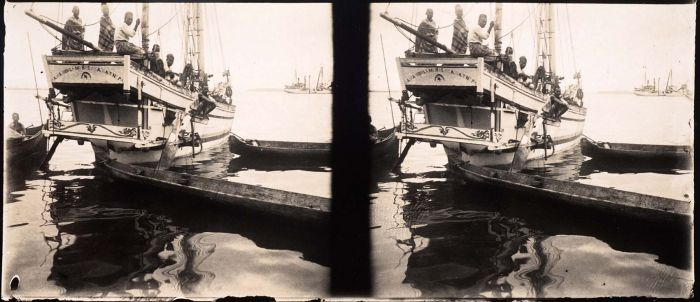
Buginese proa, cross-view stereoscopic pair

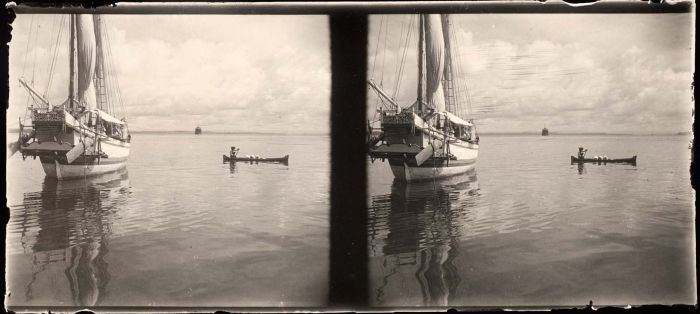
Buginese proa at harbour, southeast coast of Borneo, stereoscopic pair

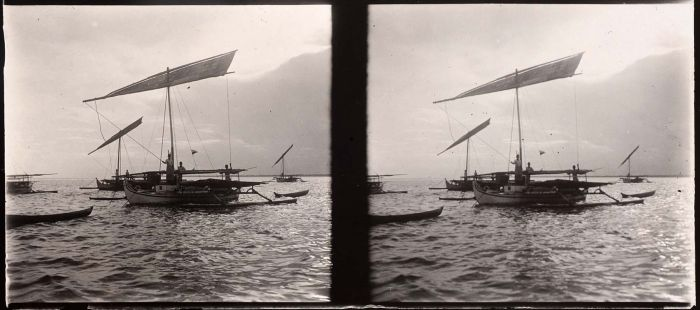
Outrigger canoes at the mouth of a river in Borneo, stereoscopic pair

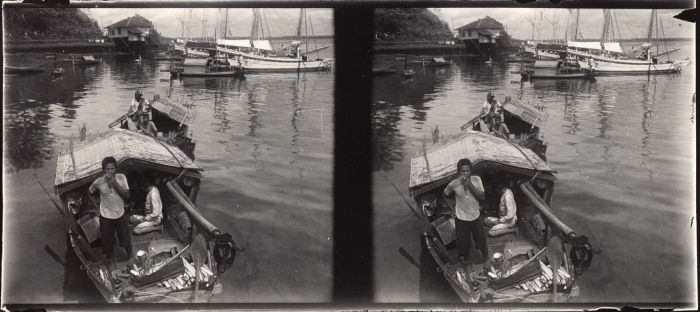
Harbour view, southeast coast of Borneo, stereoscopic pair
