= Tom Green (footballer, born 1909) =

Australian rules footballer

Personal information
- Full name: Tom Green
- Born: 13 January 1909
- Died: 3 November 1979 (aged 70)
- Height: 178 cm (5 ft 10 in)
- Weight: 74 kg (163 lb)

Playing career^{1}
Years	Club	Games (Goals)
1935	Hawthorn	3 (2)
- ^{1} Playing statistics correct to the end of 1935.

Tom Green (13 January 1909 – 3 November 1979) was an Australian rules footballer who played with Hawthorn in the Victorian Football League (VFL).
