= Raffaele Bendandi =

Italian clockmaker

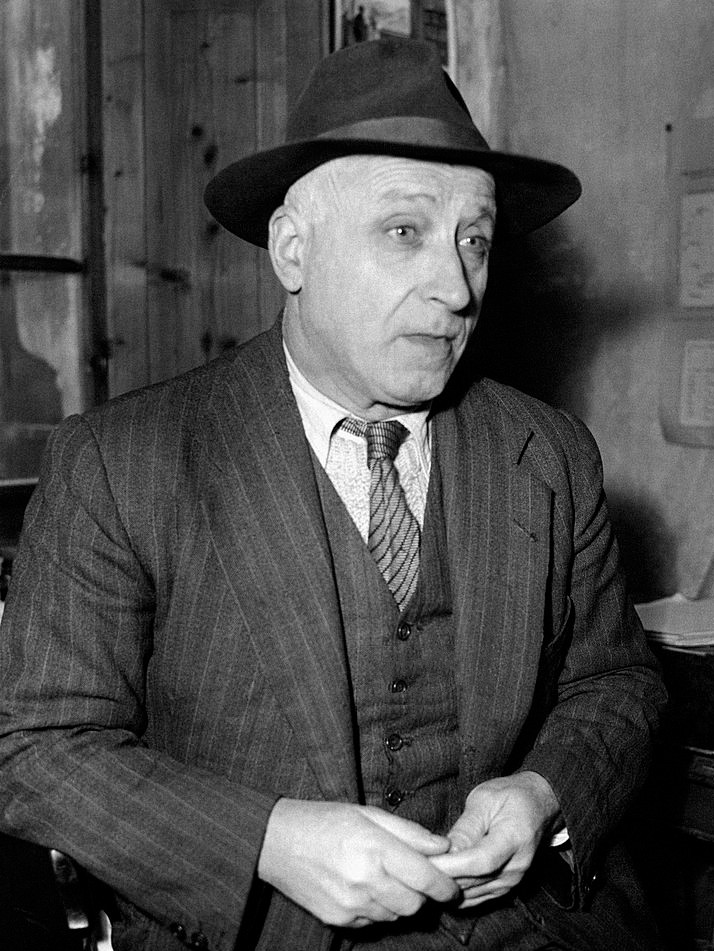
Raffaele Bendandi in 1951

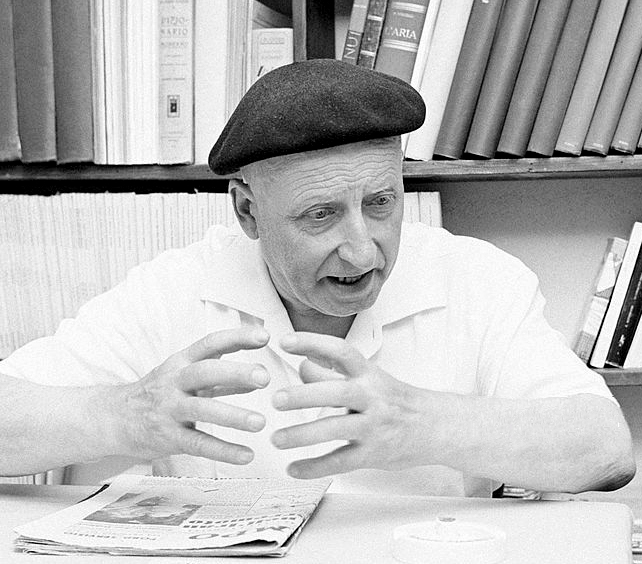
Raffaele Bendandi in the 1960s

Raffaele Bendandi (17 October 1893 – 3 November 1979) was an Italian clockmaker known for his predictions of earthquakes. Bendandi was self-taught and never published a verifiable scientific exposition of his theory.

== Life and legacy ==
Bendandi was born in Faenza to a family of modest wealth. He only attended school for five years, but at the time of the solar eclipse of 30 August 1905 became interested in planetary motion in the Solar System. He worked for a watchmaker and an engraver, and also attended a technical drawing course, enabling him to make precision instruments and drawings to explore and demonstrate his theories. After the 1908 Messina earthquake, he began studying the tides, and also devised his own form of seismograph. In October 1914 he predicted in his unpublished notes that an earthquake would take place on 13 January 1915 and, after the Avezzano earthquake did occur on that day, killing 30,000 people, he devoted much of his time to studies of past earthquakes and planetary alignments, setting up his own observatory with seismographs.

After serving in the First World War, he joined the Italian Seismology Society in 1920. Over time, he developed his own theories, which he called "seismogenics", about the nature of earthquakes. He believed, unsupported by conventional scientific evidence, that they are caused by planetary alignment in the Solar System – that the Moon, Sun, and other planets have gravitational influence on the movements of the Earth's crust. He gained fame in Italy after he registered a statement with a notary predicting that an earthquake would strike on 2 January 1924. His prediction was off by two days – an earthquake occurred on 4 January 1924 in the region of Marche. Based on this prediction, the Italian newspaper Corriere della Sera ran a front-page story about Bendandi. In the 1920s, he published many predictions of earthquakes in various Italian and foreign newspapers, including Il Progresso Italo-Americano. Benito Mussolini was impressed by him, making him a Knight of the Order of the Crown of Italy, but in 1928 banned him from making any further public predictions so as not to damage tourism.

In 1931 he published 'Un Principio Fondamentale dell'universo' . However, he never published any account of his forecasting methods. The only systematic approach to the Bendandi methodology and forecasting was carried out by Pescerelli Lagorio and Adriano Ballabene, who developed a software to test his methods. The principles of Bendandi's predictive method were exposed during European Geosciences Union General Assembly (EGU) in Vienna on 15 April 2015.

He resumed publishing forecasts in 1950, and continued making predictions until 1977, but with a break in the late 1960s. One comparison between his forecasts and actual events states that "the accuracy of Bendandi's time forecasts proved to be remarkable". In later years, his forecasts became less specific in terms of date and location, but he reportedly forecast the quake of 6 May 1976 in Friuli which killed almost 1,000.

He also claimed to have discovered a new planet between Mercury and the sun, which he named Faenza after his home town. In 1930 he reported he had discovered four previously unknown planets orbiting the Sun, well beyond Neptune.

After his death, someone burned his papers. Remaining fragments made reference to 1996–2012 solar activity. His home in Faenza was later turned into a museum, 'Casa Museo Raffaele Bendandi'.

== Events of 2011 ==
In January 2011, leaflets falsely claiming to come from the Protezione Civile, were distributed in the comune of Ciampino, stating that Bendandi had forecast an earthquake on 11 May 2011, and that residents should leave their homes before that day. Rumours continued to spread in particular through social networking sites, and specified that the earthquake would affect Rome. In May 2011 it was reported that people were fleeing Rome in readiness for an earthquake predicted to occur on 11 May. The existence of a prediction for that date was denied by the custodians of Bendandi's papers, while the Italian National Institute of Geology and Vulcanology (INGV) held an open day at its Rome office on the day. There was no earthquake in Rome that day. Nevertheless, some media reports drew attention to the fact that, on the same day, an earthquake hit the town of Lorca in Spain some 1,300 kilometres (810 mi) away. The INGV stated: "There is absolutely no link between Spain and Italy, geologically, or with the prediction of an earthquake in Rome."
