= Jimmy Deagan =

Australian rules footballer

Personal information
- Full name: James Patrick Deagan
- Born: 22 March 1898; Dookie, Victoria
- Died: 20 November 1979 (aged 81); Kew, Victoria
- Original team: St. James

Playing career^{1}
Years	Club	Games (Goals)
1919–21	St Kilda	14 (1)
- ^{1} Playing statistics correct to the end of 1921.

James Patrick Deagan (22 March 1898 – 20 November 1979) was an Australian rules footballer who played with St Kilda in the Victorian Football League (VFL).
