= Francisco Accioly Rodrigues da Costa Filho =

Brazilian lawyer, professor, and politician

Accioly Filho
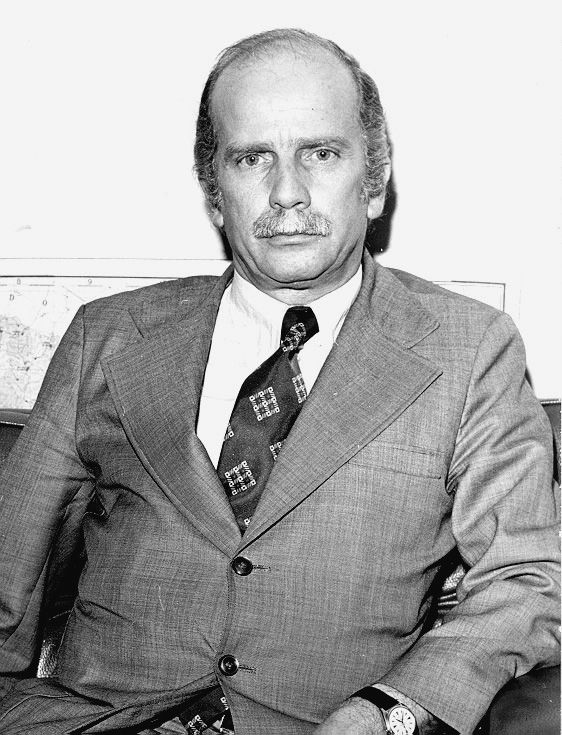

Personal details
- Born: 5 March 1920 Paranaguá, Brazil
- Died: 12 November 1979 (aged 59) Curitiba, Brazil

Francisco Accioly Rodrigues da Costa Filho (5 March 1920 in Paranaguá – 13 November 1979 in Curitiba) was a Brazilian lawyer, professor, and politician. He was a Senator of the Republic between 1971 and 1978.

== Bibliography ==
- NICOLAS, Maria. 130 Anos de Vida Parlamentar Paranaense - Assembleias Legislativas e Constituintes. 1854–1954. 2° ed. Curitiba: Assembléia Legislativa do Paraná; 1984. 779p
