= Gilbert Woo =

Gilbert Woo (December 25, 1911 – November 17, 1979) was the chief editor and co-founder of Chinese Pacific Weekly

== Early life and education in China ==
Gilbert Woo was originally born Gang Nam Woo in the Old Village of Hengjiang Township, South Central Taishan. In 1924, he attended Houde Primary School in Caohou village. After failing the entrance exam to Taishan County Middle School, he attended a one-year training course program. In 1931, Woo enrolled in a school of Chinese medicine in Guangzhou, though he soon dropped out, later taking English classes in Hong Kong.

== Career in China ==
In 1926, Woo landed a teaching position at Yuying Primary School, and in 1927, became assistant editor to the school publication Yuying Jikan. He contributed to the publication Jiantao Tekan with short essays. Woo later became part of a Tujin She group, writing and submitting articles to Taishan publications.

== Career in the United States ==
Woo arrived on Angel Island, San Francisco, in the summer of 1932 to join his parents and was held in detention for 21 days, during that time was elected as the secretary of the Liberty Association, a group run by detention center inmates. Woo began work as a waiter in a friend's restaurant in exchange for enrollment in the tenth grade of Polytechnic High School. It was here Gang Nam Woo took the name Gilbert. Woo published commentaries on developments in his home in China through Shengsheng Zazhi, a magazine he funded and founded. Gilbert Woo's brother, Gang Chew, was the editor of this magazine. Gang Chew immigrated to the United States in 1934, taking the name Norbert. Woo enrolled in Heald's College, taking a six-month course in radio, working as a family cook to support himself, and lived with his family. Woo joined the Chinese Radio Club in 1935, and published an article describing it in the Chinese Student in 1937. In 1936, Woo became the English Secretary of the Ning Yung Association.

== Return to Hong Kong ==
In 1937, Woo returned to Hong Kong, and was taken on as a mathematics teacher in Dongfang Middle School. It was in his return to Hong Kong that Woo married Li Yown Kong of Taishan, a former English classmate of his.

== Return to the United States, and continued career ==
In the outbreak of the Sino-Japanese War, Woo returned alone to the U.S. in 1938, and his wife gave birth to their daughter Nancy in 1939. Woo became an advisor to the group Chick Char, of which Norbert Woo was one of the founders. In 1939, Woo was hired at the Chinese Times as a proofreader. He was soon promoted to translator and then to the editor of the literary and Chinese News sections. In 1940, Woo began attending Lincoln University to increase his legal knowledge. Woo was drafted for military service but turned away for poor eyesight in 1942, allowing him to focus on journalism. In 1943, Woo started his widely read "Qizhe" commentary, informing readers about the war in China. Woo resigned from the Chinese Times in 1944 after a disagreement with his managing editor, Walter Lum, in a well-publicized dispute over Woo's commentaries, both sides broadcasting and publishing their positions. Woo then became the editor of the Menfeng literary section of the paper Kuo Min Yat Po, while continuing his "Qizhe" commentary there.

Separately, Woo joined Golden Star Radio in 1943, writing scripts for the newscast "The Chinese Hour", and soon became a commentator for the Golden Star Radio. This opportunity allowed Woo to translate for the Harry S. Truman Vice presidential campaign in 1944 and broadcast a community memorial service for President Roosevelt. The capstone of his radio career came when he covered the creation of the United Nations in San Francisco, in 1945. Woo left Golden Star Radio in 1948.

In 1946, Gilbert, his brother Norbert, and three friends John Hall, Yuk Ow, and James Wong founded the "Chinese Pacific Weekly". Gilbert Woo was the chief editor of the "Chinese Pacific Weekly." In 1948, Gilbert Woo resigned from "Kuo Min Yat Po" to focus on "Chinese Pacific Weekly." Following the victory of the People's Republic of China(PRC) in 1949, and backlash from Kuomintang supporters spreading rumors his newspaper was pro communist, Gilbert joined the Ying On Association, while his brother joined the Suey Sing Association, which sent members to guard the newspaper.

In 1954, Gilbert Woo co-founded the Dune Yep Corporation with his fellow villager clansmen.

In 1964, Gilbert Woo was invited to attend an event in Washington D.C. by Lyndon B. Johnson.

In the early seventies, Woo began working with Him Mark Lai to write a book of Chinese American History, though eventually abandoned the project, instead starting the column "Jinmen Yi Yu" (Reminisces by the Golden Gate).

In 1972, Woo was invited to visit China and reunited with his wife and two daughters, Nancy and Lucy, thirty years after he had left them in Hong Kong. During this trip, using the pen name "Quihong", Woo wrote a few essays for "The Week end news", a Hong Kong publication.

In September 1979 Woo gave a speech at the Chinatown banquet, an event celebrating the thirtieth anniversary of the founding of the PRC.

== Death ==
Gilbert Woo died on November 17, 1979, of a heart attack at home. His memorial service was held on December 1 and was attended by more than 300 people. His remains were cremated, with his ashes placed in the Woodlawn cemetery.

== Bibliography ==
- Kurashige, Lon; Yang, Alice, eds. (2017). Major problems in Asian American history: documents and essays. Major problems in American history series (Second ed.). Boston, MA: Cengage Learning. ISBN 978-1-285-43343-1.
- Lai, Him Mark (2004). Becoming Chinese American: a history of communities and institutions. Critical perspectives on Asian Pacific Americans series. Walnut Creek, Calif.: AltaMira Press. ISBN 978-0-7591-0457-0.
