= W. O. J. Nieuwenkamp =

Dutch painter

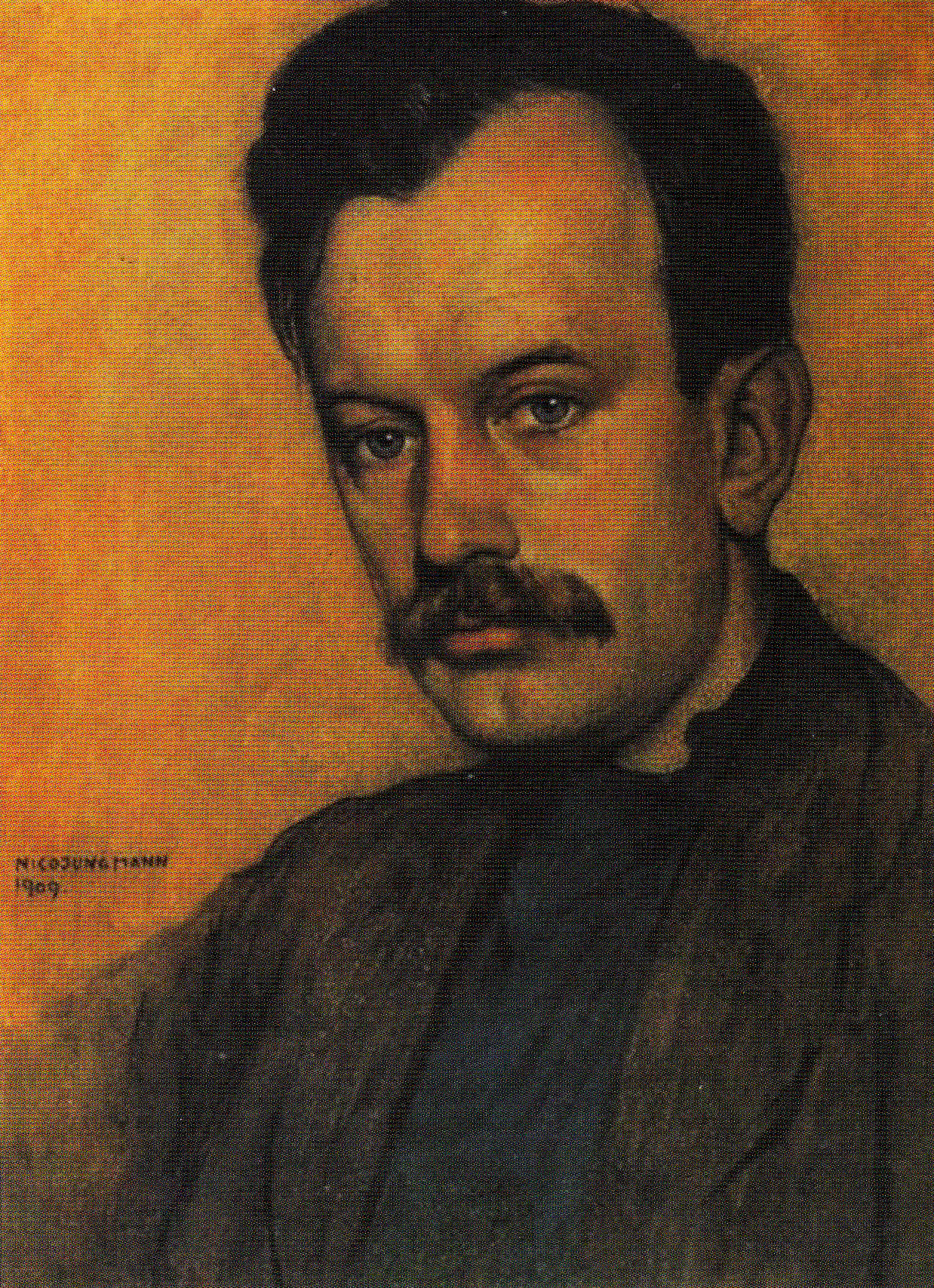
Nieuwenkamp by Nico Jungmann (1909)

Wijnand Otto Jan Nieuwenkamp (Amsterdam, July 27, 1874 – Fiesole, April 23, 1950), was a Dutch multi-faceted autodidact. As an artist he was active as a painter, draftsman, sculptor, etcher, lithographer, and designer of book covers and of ex-libris. In addition, he was also known as a writer, architect, explorer, ethnologist and collector of East Asian art.

He was one of the first European artists to visit Bali, being greatly influenced by and himself influencing the island's art and culture, and making it better known in wider world. He was also deeply involved with various other parts of the then Dutch East Indies.

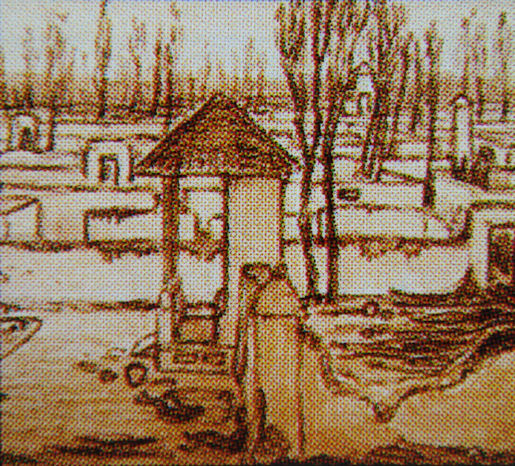
"Ruins of Denpasar" (1906) by Nieuwenkamp, originally published in the book Bali and Lombok Eyewitness Travel, p.49

== Life ==
=== Early career, houseboat travels ===
Though he took some lessons at the Amsterdamse Kunstnijverheidsschool (Amsterdam School of Applied Arts), Nieuwenkamp was mainly a self-taught artist – reckoned more a graphic artist than a painter. Working primarily in ink, his drawings were executed in rich sepia tones. There is a clear influence of Art Nouveau on his work, though he did not strictly belong to that movement.

In 1900, the year of his marriage to Anna Wilbrink, he built a houseboat called De Zwerver (The Wanderer), which was also his own nickname. In it, he sailed through the Netherlands, Belgium and Germany, holding exhibitions on board where his works could be purchased. At the time he had considerable interest in the old Dutch towns and villages of the Zuider Zee and his book on the subject was also translated to English and German.

=== Travels to the East, artistic and scientific activity, involvement with Bali ===
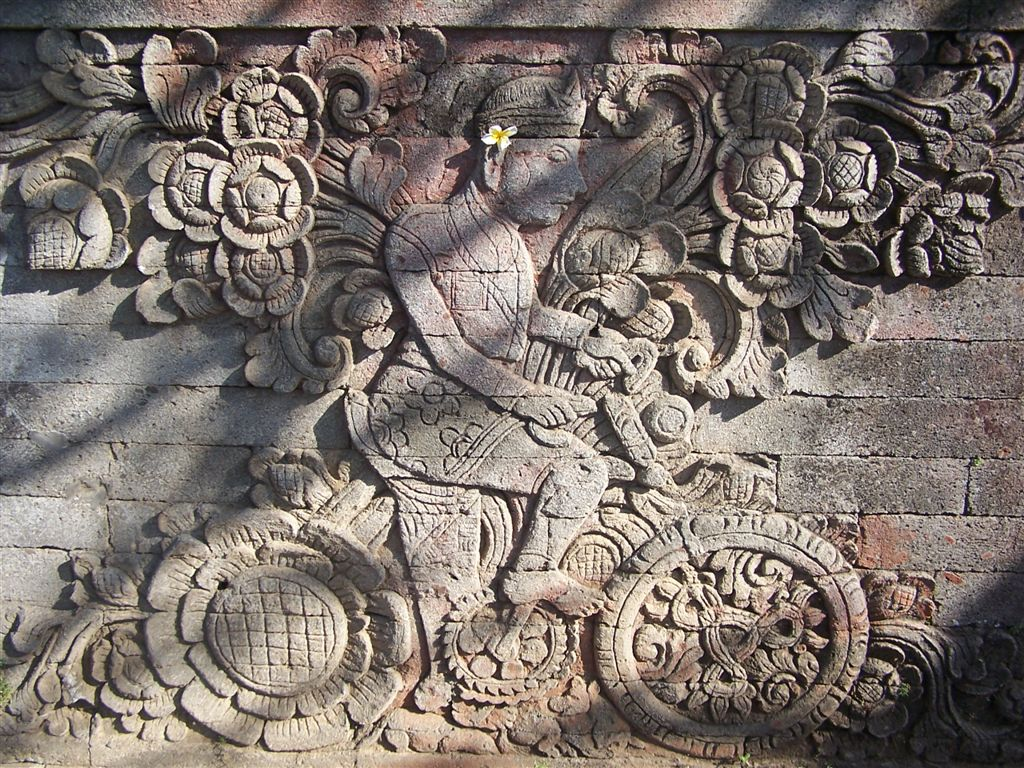
Nieuwenkamp on a bike, Pura Meduwe Karang temple, Bali

From the late 1890s and for several decades afterwards, he repeatedly journeyed to Far East and Middle East, and in particular to various islands of the Dutch East Indies – starting with Java in 1898 and 1904, and then Bali and Lombok in 1906 and 1907. In the aftermath of the brutal Dutch military intervention of 1906, destroying the last independent kingdom on Bali, he painted the ruins of the town of Denpasar, destroyed by Dutch troops (see illustration).

The drawing appeared in his book "Bali and Lombok" (1906–1910), which also included pioneering ethnographic and archaeological studies and is considered an important early book about this island. Bali made a deep impact on Nieuwenkamp, and he returned to the island again and again over the years – not only to make his own art but to learn the Balinese traditional painting.

Bruce Carpenter notes that Nieuwenkamp "played a critical role in creating the myth of Bali, most importantly through his support of the German doctor and amateur photographer, Gregor Krause. Together they held the first exhibition of Balinese Art in Amsterdam in 1918, with Krause's photos and Nieuwenkamp's drawings. It is Krause's later book which brought many later artists to Bali".

In 1913 and 1914, he was in British India. From 1917 to 1919 he traveled to Java, Bali and Timor. In 1924–1925 he traveled to Sumatra, Java and Bali, under an assignment for the Handelsvereeniging Amsterdam (Commercial Association of Amsterdam). In 1933–1934 he traveled to Egypt. In 1936/1937 he traveled to Bali for the last time. A planned later trip was prevented by the outbreak of World War II.

Following these travels, he wrote and illustrated various articles and books. Many of his articles were published in the journal "Nederlandsch Indië, Oud en Nieuw" (Dutch Indies, Old and New). Also scientific journals published his contributions.

After 1925, much of Nieuwenkamp's work was related to the Barabudur, a major 9th-century Buddhist monument in Central Java. A scholar of Hindu and Buddhist architecture, Nieuwenkamp developed 1931 the Borobudur ancient lake theory, according to which the Kedu Plain was once a lake, and Barabudur initially represented a lotus flower floating on that lake. Nieuwenkamp's theory is up to the present the basis for discussion and debate among archaeologists and geologists, involved in research of this important site.

Nieuwenkamp was the first person to systematically describe the Bronze Age object known in Bali as the Moon of Pejeng, the largest single-cast bronze kettle drum in the world and the focus of various local legends and myths. Nieuwenkamp reproduced the Moon's famous face motif.

=== Later life, move to Italy ===
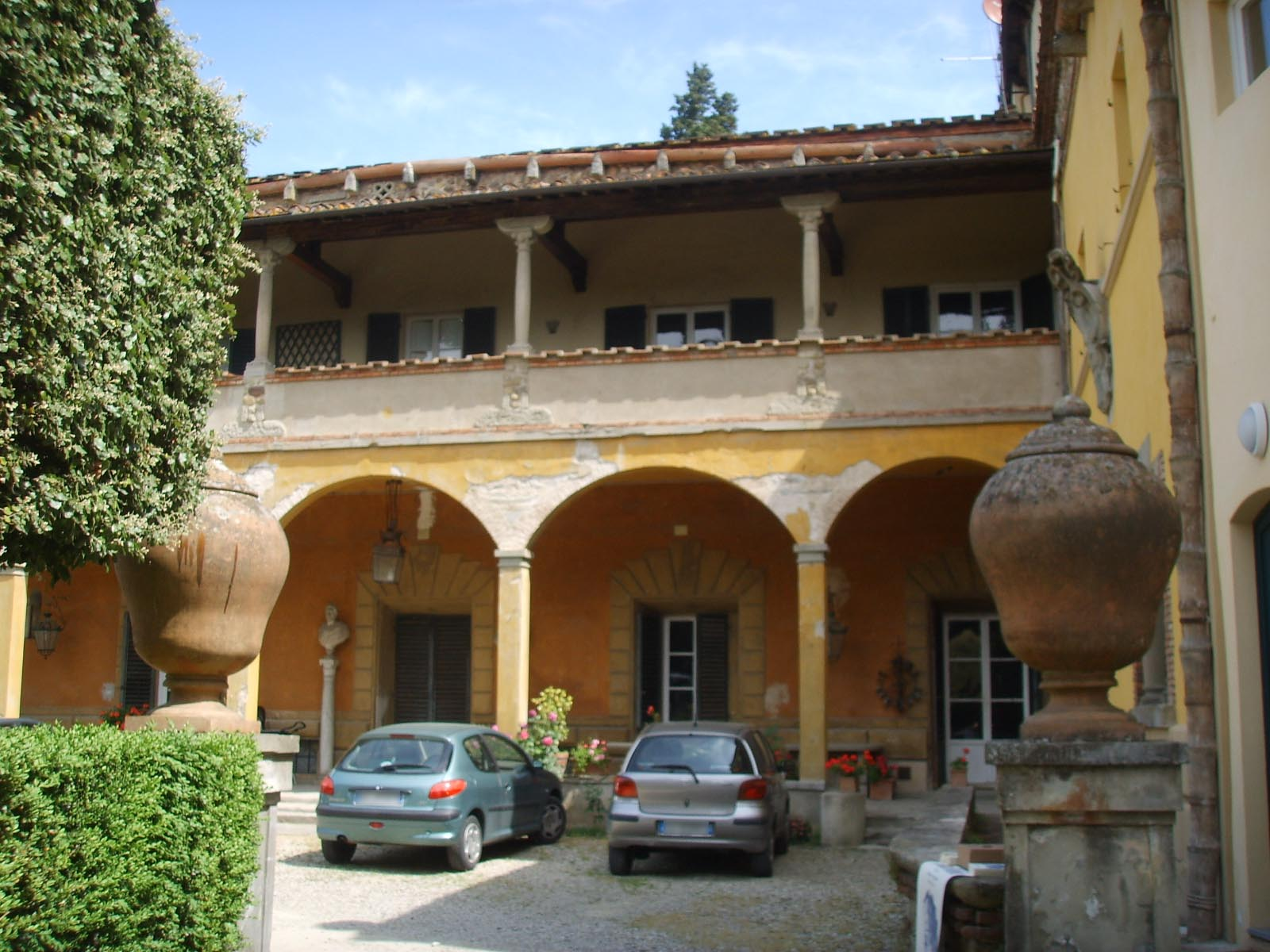
Villa Nieuwenkamp in Fiesole

With his wife Anna, Nieuwenkamp had four children. The growth of his family, as well as his increasing accumulation of art objects collected on his trips abroad, forced him to abandon his houseboat and build a house on land. This move was the subject of his book My Home on the Water, My House on the Land.

From 1910 to 1920, he lived and worked at Edam in the Netherlands. Then he moved to Italy, initially drifting, then living in Rome. Later he bought a villa in Fiesole near Florence, which was the subject of a book — A Florentine Villa. There he remained until his death in 1950.

=== Contacts and co-workers ===
Nieuwenkamp maintained contacts with

- Marius Bauer (1867–1932)
- Pieter Dupont (1870–1911)
- J.M. Graadt van Roggen (1867–1959)
- Simon Moulijn (1866–1948)
- S.H. de Roos (1877–1962)
- Jan Toorop (1858–1928)
- J. G. Veldheer (1866–1954)
- R.W.P. de Vries (1874–1952)
- Gregor Krause

=== Legacy ===
A museum dedicated to Nieuwenkamp's work was opened at Edam in July 1949, but was closed in the 1970s. However, the Nieuwenkamp Museum Foundation still exists and maintains a large collection, derived from legacies.

His son, Willem, became a noted geologist and one of his daughters, Fernande, became the director of the Dutch University Institute for Art History in Florence. His grandson, also called W.O.J. Nieuwenkamp, published his biography, as did several others (see bibliography).

The villa where he lived in Fiesole is still known as "Villa Nieuwenkamp" (as well as "Riposo dei Vescovi").

Bruce Carpenter's definitive publication on Nieuwenkamp notes with regret that his "large body of work on Bali and Indonesia, which includes nearly one thousand delightful drawings and paintings" does not get appropriate attention.

== Bibliography ==
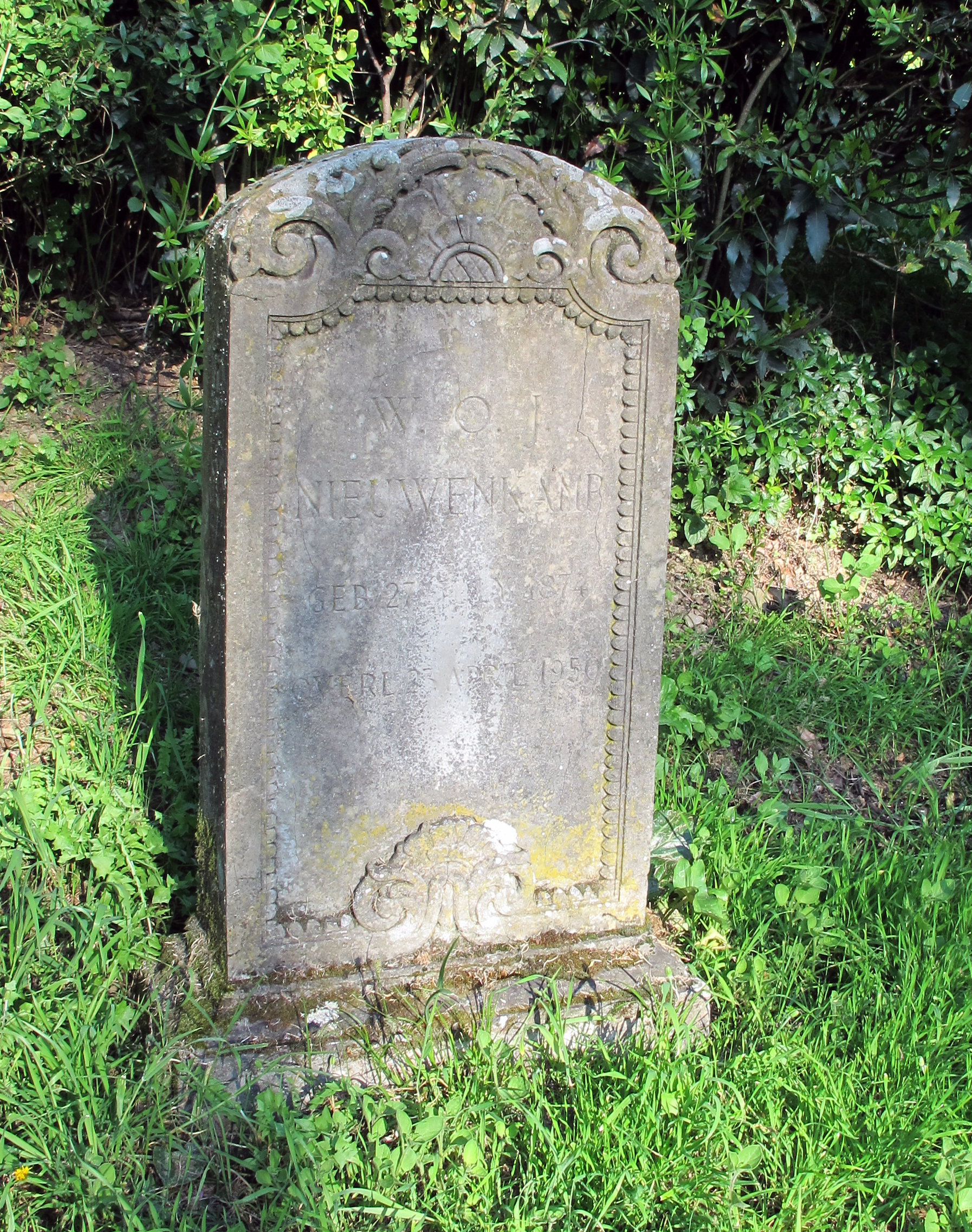
Grave in Fiesole

=== His own works ===
- "Old Dutch towns on the Zuider Zee" (Dutch "Oude Hollandsche steden aan de Zuiderzee") (with J.G. Veldheer), Erven F. Bohn, Haarlem, 1897 and 1901
- "Old Dutch towns and villages of the Zuider Zee" (English version of the above), T. Fischer Unwin, 1901
- "Holländische Städte Alte und an der Dörfer Zuidersee" (German version of the above), Eugen Diederichs, Leipzig, 1902
- "Guide to Bandung, Garut and surroundings" ("Gids voor Bandoeng, Garoet en omstreken"), Homan Hotel and Hotel Horck, Bandung, 1908
- "Bali and Lombok" ("Bali en Lombok")(in three volumes), Zwerver uitgave, 1910.
- "Wanderings in Bali" ("Zwerftochten door Bali"), Elsevier, Amsterdam, 1906/1910 (abridged version of the previous)
- "Two hundred etchings and woodcuts by W.O.J. Nieuwenkamp" ("Vijftig nieuwe etsen van W.O.J. Nieuwenkamp"), Wed. G. Dorens en Zoon, Amsterdam, 1912
- "Fifty new etching by W.O.J. Nieuwenkamp" ("Vijftig nieuwe etsen van W.O.J. Nieuwenkamp"), Eisenloeffels Kunsthandel, v.h. Wed. G. Dorens en Zoon, Amsterdam, 1916
- "Wanderings in Bali" ("Zwerftochten op Bali"), Elsevier, Amsterdam, 1922 (revised version of the 1906–1910 book, based on 1918 visit to Bali)
- "Collected works of W.O.J. Nieuwenkamp" – in German ("Sammlung W.O.J. Nieuwenkamp"), Auriga Verlag, Berlin, also included in the 1924 title "Malaien" (Malays).
- "Holy Cities" ("Heilige steden"), HP Leopold Ed. Me., The Hague, 1924
- "1874–1924: W.O.J. Nieuwenkamp", Galerie Kleykamp, The Hague, 1924
- "Rambling through Timor and the Dependencies" ("Zwerftocht door Timor en onderhoorigheden"), Elsevier, Amsterdam, 1925
- "Architecture of Bali" ("Bouwkunst van Bali"), HP Leopold Ed. Me., The Hague, 1926
- "L'Oeuvre Grave Nieuwenkamp" (A. Mak, Amsterdam), 1927
- "Sculpture of Bali" ("Beeldhouwkunst van Bali"), HP Leopold Ed. Me., The Hague, 1928
- "My Home on the Water, My House on the Land" ("Mijn huis op het water, mijn huis op het land"), Leopold Ed. Me., The Hague – Part I, 1930. Part II, 1935.
- "A Florentine Villa" ("Een Florentijnsche villa"), Leopold Ed. Me., The Hague, 1936
- "Calendar for 1938" ("Kalender voor 1938"), Volksuniversiteit, Rotterdam, 1937
- "Architecture and Sculpture in Bali" ("Bouwkunst en Beeldhouwkunst van Bali"), HP Leopold Ed. Me., The Hague, 1947
- "The House on the Hill" ("Het Huis op den Heuvel"), HP Leopold Ed. Me., The Hague, 1949
- "Ethno-graphics of Bali" ("Etno-grafikus van Bali"), Ethnological Museum Nusantara, Delft, 1974 (published posthumously)
- W.O.J. Nieuwenkamp: Bouwstoffen. Toegepaste grafiek & illustraties. [Incl.: Tweehonderd etsen en houtsneden & Vijftig nieuwe etsen. Ed.: Ernst Braches i.s.m. J.F. Heijbroek. Amsterdam, Uitgeverij De Buitenkant, 2016. ISBN 9789490913618

=== By Others ===
- Johan Schwencke, "Two hundred Dutch graphic artists, since the end of the Nineteenth Century" ("Tweehonderd Nederlandse grafische kunstenaars, sedert het eind der negentiende eeuw"), Wereldbibliotheek, Amsterdam, 1954.
- W.O.J. Nieuwenkamp (the grandson), "W.O.J.N., life and work, building and wandering of the artist Nieuwenkamp, recorded by his grandson" ("W.O.J.N., leven en werken, bouwen en zwerven van de kunstenaar W.O.J. Nieuwenkamp, opgetekend door zijn kleinzoon"), A. W. Bruna & Zoon, Utrecht, 1979. ISBN 90-229-5294-0
- Bruce W. Carpenter, "W.O.J. Nieuwenkamp, First European Artist in Bali", Uniepers Abcoude, 1997. ISBN 90-6825-198-8
- Ruud Spruit, "Artists on Bali: Nieuwenkamp, Bonnet, Spics, Hofker, Le Mayeur, Arie Smit", Pepin Press, 1997. ISBN 90-5496-025-6
- J.F.K. Kits Nieuwenkamp "W. J. O. Nieuwenkamp (1874–1950): artist, writer, architect, explorer, ethnologist and collector of East Asian Art" ("W. O. J. Nieuwenkamp (1874–1950) : beeldend kunstenaar, schrĳver, architect, ontdekkingsreiziger, ethnoloog en verzamelaar van Oostaziatische kunst : gezien door tĳdgenoten"), Bekking & Blitz, Amersfoort, 1997.
