= William Peare =

Irish cricketer

Personal information
- Full name: William George Peare
- Born: 25 June 1905; Waterford, Ireland
- Died: 16 November 1979 (aged 74); Cork, Munster, Ireland
- Batting: Right-handed
- Bowling: Right-arm medium-fast

Domestic team information
- Years: Team
- 1926: Warwickshire
- 1936: Marylebone Cricket Club

Career statistics
Competition	First-class
Matches	8
Runs scored	19
Batting average	4.75
100s/50s	–/–
Top score	12*
Balls bowled	516
Wickets	8
Bowling average	26.62
5 wickets in innings	–
10 wickets in match	–
Best bowling	3/45
Catches/stumpings	3/–
- Source: Cricinfo, 7 July 2023

William George Peare (25 June 1905 – 16 November 1979) was an Irish cricketer who played in first-class cricket matches for Warwickshire in 1926 and for the Marylebone Cricket Club in 1936. He was born in Waterford and died in Cork.

Peare, a right-handed tailend batsman and a right-arm medium-fast bowler, was one of several new players tried by Warwickshire in the 1926 season in an attempt to fill the gap in the bowling left by the departure at the end of the 1925 season of Harry Howell. He was given seven matches, most of them in the early part of the season, but took only two wickets in them. He was perhaps unlucky with weather, in that his first two matches were rained off before he was brought on to bowl, but later on there seemed a marked reluctance to bowl him: in his final game, against the weak Worcestershire side, he did not bowl at all in the first innings and was the sixth bowler used in the second innings. Peare's bowling action at this time is described in a report of the Yorkshire match at Edgbaston in late May 1926: "[Peare] has a short corkscrew kind of run, and a quick action, but his pace is only medium." The same newspaper reported that, in the same innings, Peare, fielding at mid-off, had let two successive shots from Herbert Sutcliffe off the bowling of Bob Wyatt pass through his hands to the boundary.

Peare was not given a contract by Warwickshire. His only other rather more successful appearance in first-class cricket came 10 years later when he played for MCC against Ireland in Dublin; on this occasion, he opened the bowling and took six wickets, three in each innings.
