= D. C. Riddy =

British linguist and educationalist (1907–1979)

D. C. Riddy CBE
- Born: 10 September 1907; Bedford, England
- Died: 20 November 1979 (aged 72)
- Resting place: Bedford, England
- Education: Bedford Modern School
- Alma mater: St Catharine's College, Cambridge
- Occupations: Linguist, educationalist
- Spouse: Constance White (m.1933)

Donald Charles Riddy CBE (10 September 1907 – 20 November 1979) was a British linguist and educationalist. After the Second World War, he was the British Controller-General of the Education Branch, Control Commission for German - British Element, tasked with assisting the de-nazification of Germany through a process of re-education. He was later co-ordinator of the Council of Europe Modern Languages Programme and, for most of his career, Her Majesty's Chief Inspector of Modern Languages in Schools. He was described as a man of ‘wide administrative experience and enormous energy, for whom material difficulties were a challenge which he met with enthusiasm’.

== Early life ==
Riddy was born in Bedford on 10 September 1907, the son of Arthur John Riddy, a baker and corn dealer, and his wife Alice Jane Riddy. He was educated at Bedford Modern School, where he was a member of the cricket team, and St Catharine's College, Cambridge, where he played rugby in the First XV.

== Career ==
Riddy was an assistant master at Felsted School between 1930 and 1940. In 1934, he was responsible for rugby and carried out a revision of the Forties; Second Forty became the Cromwell Club. He left Felsted School to become an inspector of schools.

Riddy was the British Controller-General of the Education Branch, Control Commission for German - British Element, after the Second World War. One of his tasks was to counter twelve years of Nazi indoctrination through a process of re-education. The aim was to eliminate Nazi and militaristic tendencies and to encourage the development of democratic ideas. Notwithstanding the stringency of the aim, Riddy's method and approach was to stress the importance of showing the German people the "benevolent attitude of the occupying power and encouraging a belief in Germany's future".

After his role in Germany, Riddy was made overall co-ordinator of the Council of Europe Modern Languages Programme and, for most of his career, was Her Majesty's Chief Inspector of Modern Languages in Schools. He was Professor of Applied Linguistics at the University of Essex between 1969 and 1970.

Riddy was made CBE in 1946.

== Family life ==
In 1933, Riddy married Constance White in Bedford. He died in Bedford on 20 November 1979 and was survived by his wife, children and grandchildren. He was described as a man of "wide administrative experience and enormous energy, for whom material difficulties were a challenge which he met with enthusiasm". Felicity Riddy is his daughter-in-law.

== Selected works ==
- What Should America Do Now In Bizonia? Reel to reel tape, 1955
- Recent Developments in Modern Language Teaching. Strasbourg, 1964
- Développements récents dans le domaine de l'enseignement des langues vivantes : 1. Résolutions adoptées par les 2e et 3e Conférences des ministres européens de l'éducation. 2. Compte rendu de trois stages du Conseil de l'Europe, présenté par D. C. Riddy. Strasbourg, 1964
- Modern Languages And The World Of Today. Published by AIDELA, Strasbourg, 1967
- Les Langues vivante et le monde moderne. AIDELA, Strasbourg, 1968
- The initial training of teachers of modern foreign languages in colleges and departments of education : report of a survey; carried out between Jan. 1970 and March 1971 / Part 2, Courses for graduates at colleges and departments of education. 1974
- The Work Of The Council of Europe In The Field of Modern Languages. Strasbourg, 1972
- The initial training of teachers of modern foreign languages in colleges and departments of education; report of a survey. Colchester, 1974
