= Hovey Freeman =

Puerto Rican sailor (1932–1979)

Personal information
- Nationality: Puerto Rican
- Born: 13 April 1932; Providence, Rhode Island, United States
- Died: 29 November 1979 (aged 47); Providence, Rhode Island, United States

Sport
- Sport: Sailing

Hovey Freeman (13 April 1932 – 29 November 1979) was a Puerto Rican sailor. He competed at the 1968 Summer Olympics, the 1972 Summer Olympics and the 1976 Summer Olympics. He was also bronze medallist at the 1965 Snipe World Championship.
