= Leopoldo Costa =

Spanish footballer and manager

Personal information
- Full name: Leopoldo Costa Payá
- Date of birth: 7 May 1901
- Place of birth: Chella, Valencia, Spain
- Date of death: 20 November 1979 (aged 78)
- Place of death: Unknown
- Position: Forward

Senior career*
Years	Team	Apps	(Gls)
1922–1932	Valencia CF		

Managerial career
- 1942–1943: Valencia CF
- 1948–1950: UD Mestalla
- 1950–1951: CD Castellón
- 1951–1958: UD Mestalla
- * Club domestic league appearances and goals

Leopoldo Costa Payá, better known as Rino Costa (7 May 1901 – 20 November 1979), was a Spanish footballer who played as a forward for Valencia CF, and later a manager, taking charge over Valencia.

He was one of the first footballers to play his entire career for Valencia CF, and thus be part of the so-called one-club men group. "Rino" is an abbreviated form of his childhood nickname, "Risetes".

== Playing career ==
=== Club career ===
Leopoldo Costa was born on 7 May 1901 in the Chella, Valencia, and he began his footballing career in his hometown club Valencia CF in 1922, at the age of 21 after having played briefly for Atlético Saguntino. He quickly established himself and became an undisputed starter as a right winger for more than a decade since his debut in a friendly match against FC Barcelona on 2 August 1922, which ended in a 2–4 loss. He was the only survivor from the Camp de l'Algirós era who was a member of the Valencia team that reached promotion to the First Division in 1931, playing two games in the highest category until his official retirement in 1932.

His goal-scoring productivity was notable, above the average for his position, netting 78 goals in 402 games played, although without a doubt his greatest virtue was assisting the forward; he won eight regional championships of Valencia. With the arrival of professionalization, he began to lose his space and so in 1932, at the age of 30, he decided to hang up his boots to focus on the drugstore that he had opened on Calle San Vicente and that almost survived into the 21st century.

=== International career ===
As a Valencia player, Costa was eligible to play for the Valencian national team, and he was part of the team's first-ever line-up on 19 November 1922, in the quarter-finals of the 1922–23 Prince of Asturias Cup against an Andalusia XI, who were also making their international with the likes of Kinké, and although they lost 1–2, Cubells scored the consolation goal, thus becoming the author of the first goal in the history of the team. In the following edition they faced Andalusia in the quarter-finals again, and again they lost, this time 2–3.

== Playing style ==
In an era of change in professional football, Costa earned a reputation as an adaptable and innovative player. He was known for effective dribbling and accurate crosses, which fostered strong chemistry with teammates Montes and Eduardo Cubells. Though remembered more for his passing, his diagonal runs and hard shots made him an above-average goal scorer. Contemporary commentators noted his athleticism, which allowed him to run down the wing with exceptional control.

== Managerial career ==
After the Spanish Civil War ended in 1939, Rino took his first steps as a coach, turning the Valencia amateur side into a national champion in 1942, and his feat led him to become coach of the first team on 11 July 1942 after the departure of Ramón Encinas, who had led Valencia to its first-ever titles after the first titles won: the 1941 Copa del Rey and the 1941–42 La Liga. In doing so, he became the first Valencia player to became the club's coach, something that has happened a further 17 times since. He made his debut in a preseason match in Burjassot, which ended in a 3–2 win. Despite a promising start (second place at the midway point) and being advised by Eduardo Cubells, a man of great experience, the season turned out to be somewhat gray, so he left on 11 April 1943 without completing a year in the position to return to work with the amateur team again.

Such was his enthusiasm for the lower categories, that it was his idea to propose a subsidiary team located on Cuenca Street, which would be created under the presidency of Luis Casanova Giner and baptized as Club Deportivo Mestalla, now known as VCF Mestalla. He remained linked to the Mestalla club until his retirement, except for one season, 1950–51, as coach of Castellón.

Gennaro Gattuso, also known as Rino Gattuso, became the coach of Valencia in 2022, thus becoming the second "Rino" to do so.

== Death ==
Rino died on 20 November 1979, at the age of 78.

== Honours ==
Valencia CF

Valencia Championship:

- Winners (6): 1923, 1925, 1926, 1927, 1931, 1932

Segunda División:

- Winners (1): 1930–31
