= Bobby Trapp =

Canadian ice hockey player

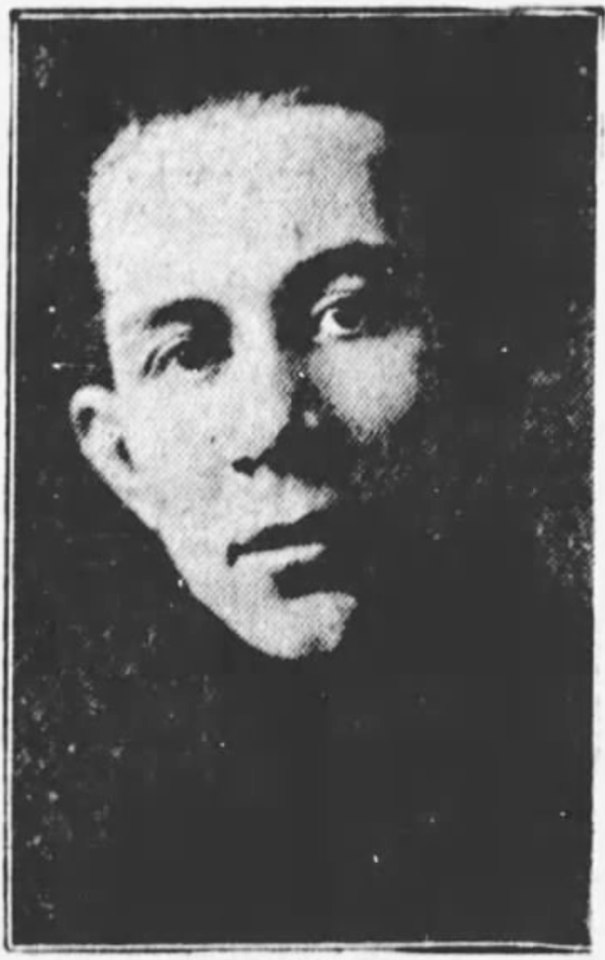
- Trapp c. 1920
- Born: December 19, 1897 Pembroke, Ontario
- Died: November 20, 1979 (aged 81)
- Height: 5 ft 10 in (178 cm)
- Weight: 170 lb (77 kg; 12 st 2 lb)
- Position: Defence
- Shot: Left
- Played for: Edmonton Eskimos; Chicago Black Hawks
- Playing career: 1914–1934

Robert Albert Trapp (December 19, 1897 – November 20, 1979) was a Canadian ice hockey forward who played 82 games in the National Hockey League for the Chicago Black Hawks during the 1926–27 and 1927–28 seasons. Trapp also played for the Edmonton Eskimos in the Big-4 League and Western Canada Hockey League from 1919 to 1925, and played hockey until retiring in 1934.

He was born in Pembroke, Ontario.

== Career statistics ==
=== Regular season and playoffs ===
			Regular season					Playoffs
Season	Team	League	GP	G	A	Pts	PIM	GP	G	A	Pts	PIM
1914–15	Toronto R&AA	OHA Sr	—	—	—	—	—	—	—	—	—	—
1915–16	Toronto R&AA	OHA Sr	8	4	0	4	—	—	—	—	—	—
1916–17	Toronto Veterans	OHA Sr	3	2	1	3	0	—	—	—	—	—
1919–20	Edmonton Eskimos	Big-4	12	2	2	4	6	2	0	0	0	0
1920–21	Edmonton Dominions	Big-4	16	6	1	7	2	—	—	—	—	—
1921–22	Edmonton Eskimos	WCHL	24	5	4	9	5	2	1	0	1	0
1922–23	Edmonton Eskimos	WCHL	26	5	5	10	14	2	0	1	1	2
1922–23	Edmonton Eskimos	St-Cup	—	—	—	—	—	2	0	0	0	2
1923–24	Edmonton Eskimos	WCHL	30	5	4	9	20	—	—	—	—	—
1924–25	Edmonton Eskimos	WCHL	27	8	11	19	33	—	—	—	—	—
1925–26	Portland Rosebuds	WHL	30	4	12	16	55	—	—	—	—	—
1926–27	Chicago Black Hawks	NHL	44	4	2	6	94	2	0	0	0	4
1927–28	Chicago Black Hawks	NHL	38	0	2	2	37	—	—	—	—	—
1928–29	Tulsa Oilers	AHA	40	8	6	14	30	4	1	0	1	14
1929–30	Tulsa Oilers	AHA	23	1	3	4	10	—	—	—	—	—
1930–31	Tulsa Oilers	AHA	45	8	13	21	54	4	0	0	0	2
1931–32	Tulsa Oilers	AHA	25	4	3	7	30	—	—	—	—	—
1931–32	Providence Reds	Can-Am	14	2	2	4	12	5	0	2	2	6
1932–33	Providence Reds	Can-Am	44	3	11	14	50	2	1	0	1	0
1933–34	Providence Reds	Can-Am	17	0	1	1	2	—	—	—	—	—
WCHL/WHL totals			137	27	36	63	127	4	1	1	2	2
NHL totals			82	4	4	8	131	2	0	0	0	4
