= Hans Nachtsheim =

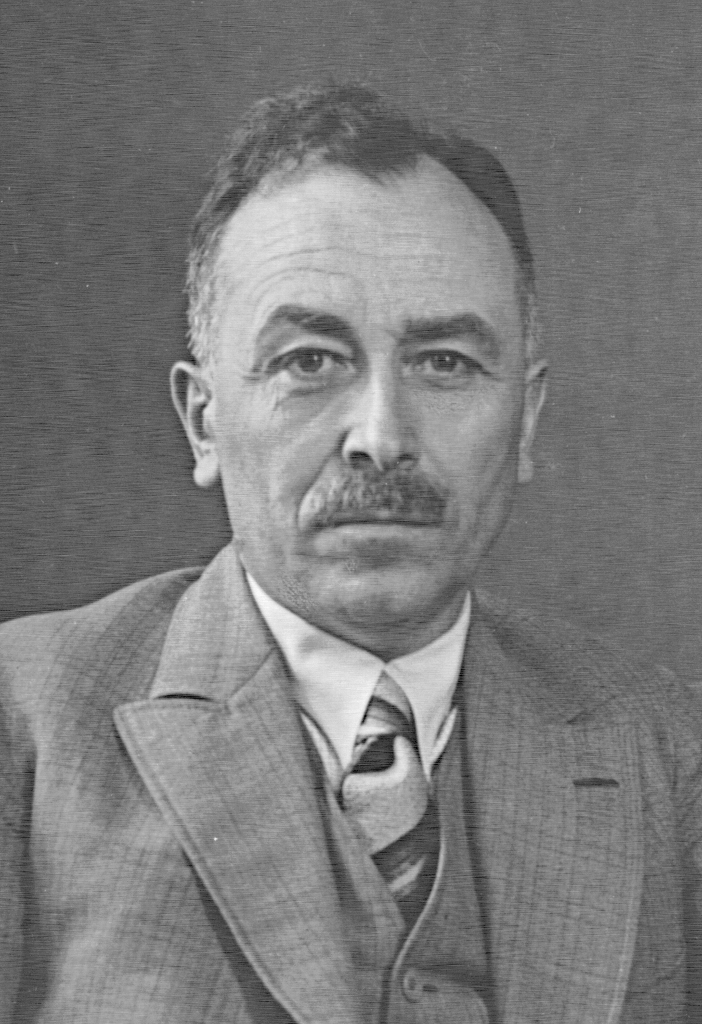

Hans Nachtsheim (13 June 1890 – 24 November 1979) was a German geneticist and eugenicist. He worked on human genetics and headed the department of hereditary pathology at the Kaiser Wilhelm Institute for Anthropology, heredity and eugenics in Berlin from 1941. He was involved in experiments conducted with Nazi institutional support on humans and worked closely with Eugen Fischer and Otmar von Verschuer. He was however not found guilty during trials conducted by the Allies after the war. He was the only German who contributed to the UNESCO declaration against racism in 1949.

== Life and work ==
Nachtsheim was born in Koblenz where his father Friedrich was a judge in the court of Cologne. He studied classics and natural sciences and then went to study zoology in Bonn and Munich. In 1912 his work on sex determination in honey bees. He received a doctorate in 1913 and went to work with Franz Doflein in Freiburg and then in 1916 became an assistant to Richard Hertwig in 1916. During World War I he was involved in hydrobiological research. He studied and translated Thomas Hunt Morgan's text on heredity in 1921. He carried out experiments on Drosophila from 1921. He habilitated in 1919 and in 1923 he joined the institute for heredity research under the Agricultural University in Berlin under Erwin Baur. He conducted studies on various animals including rabbits and was particularly interested in domestication.

In 1926 he received a Rockefeller fellowship and went to work with T. H. Morgan in Columbia University. He was politically reviewed by the Nazi party that came into power and they noted that he was a supporter of the German Reich based on the flag that he had hoisted during the Weimar period. He was invited by Eugen Fischer to head a hereditary pathology department at the Anthropology institute in Berlin. He joined in 1941 and worked along with Fischer and Otmar von Verschuer. He became interested in hereditary diseases including Parkinson's disease, epilepsy, dwarfism and Pelger anomaly. His work was to fit closely with new laws for sterilization. In epilepsy, he sought to differentiate hereditary and non-hereditary forms and for this he tested the induction of seizures in rabbits using Cardiazol at different doses. Nachtsheim believed that seizures were caused by low oxygen and along with Gerhard Ruhenstroth-Bauer they experimented with 11 to 13-year-old children in low-pressure chambers (corresponding to air at 4000 to 6000 m altitude). Of six children that were traced only one survived the war. Some of the children had come from the euthanasia institution in Görden. Nachtsheim defended the value of subjects sent from concentration camps on the grounds that they were to be killed anyway.

At the end of the war, Von Vershuer moved away from Berlin and Nachtsheim stayed on in Dahlem. Nachtsheim had never been a member of the NSDAP. He was able to defend himself in trials and absolved of any guilt. In 1946 he became the head of genetics at Humboldt University in Berlin. In 1949, he was the only German to contribute to the UNESCO declaration on racism. When the German Democratic Republic was influenced by Lysenkoism from the Soviet Union he stated that this was the same kind of pseudoscience as the race biology of Nazi times and that totalinarianism and science could not coexist. He then resigned and moved to West Berlin in the Freie University in 1948 and from 1953 he also served as a director in the Max Planck Institute for Comparative Genetic Biology and Hereditary Pathology.

After his death, a Hans Nachtsheim award was instituted by the Society for Anthropology and Human Genetics for work in human genetics. The award was however renamed partly because he had supported the policy of sterilization stating that it was not a Nazi policy.
