= Leopold Conville =

Lieutenant Colonel Leopold Conville CBE
- Born: 19 October 1896; Multan, British India
- Died: 12 November 1979 (aged 83); Odiham, Hampshire
- Children: David Conville
- Military career
- Allegiance: United Kingdom
- Branch: British Army
- Rank: Lieutenant Colonel
- Unit: Royal Garrison Artillery
- Conflicts: First World War

Lieutenant Colonel Leopold Henry George Conville CBE (19 October 1896 – 12 November 1979) was a British Army officer and farmer in Sahiwal Punjab on land that is now in Pakistan. He was appointed OBE and later CBE for services to the United Kingdom community in West Pakistan.

== Early life and family ==
Leopold Conville was born at Multan now in Pakistan on 19 October 1896 to H. T. Conville (died 1939), a farmer and agent for agricultural machinery, and his wife. He was educated at Dulwich College and the Royal Military Academy Sandhurst. He married Katherine Mary (Teresa) Gispert (1898-1973) and they had sons David Conville (1929-2018) who became a noted actor and theatre director, and an older child Michael.

== Career ==
Conville served in the British Army Royal Garrison Artillery as a second lieutenant and later as a captain. He eventually rose to the rank of lieutenant colonel.

He inherited the very large Convillepur Farm, Sahiwal, in the Punjab, on his father's death in 1939. It was the subject of a reported Indian tax case in 1936 and is now in Pakistan. He was appointed OBE, and in 1960 was made CBE for services to the United Kingdom community in West Pakistan.

== Death ==
Conville died 12 November 1979. His address at the time of his death was Wisteria House, Colt Hill, Odiham, Hampshire. He was buried in Odiham Cemetery.
