= Richard Q. Yardley =

American cartoonist

Richard Quincy Yardley (March 11, 1903 – November 24, 1979) was an editorial cartoonist for The Baltimore Sun, Maryland, United States. He joined the Sun in 1923, later replacing Edmund Duffy who left to take a cartoonist position at The Saturday Evening Post. Yardley became known for his distinctive blend of unusual cartooning styles, with Duffy later describing Yardley's work as "truly original."
