= Benedict Obidinma Odinamadu =

Nigerian civil servant (1927–1979)

Sir Benedict Obidinma Odinamadu
- Born: Benedict Obidinma Odinamadu; 14 July 1927; Abatete, Idemili North LGA, Anambra State, Nigeria
- Died: 8 November 1979 (aged 52); Enugu, Nigeria
- Resting place: Abatete, Anambra State, Nigeria; 6.129340°N 6.952970°E
- Education: Christ the King College, Onitsha (CKC)
- Alma mater: University College, Ibadan
- Occupation: Civil Service
- Political party: Unity Party of Nigeria (2nd Republic)
- Spouse: Oyibo Ekwulo Odinamadu (m. 1957)
- Children: 4
- Awards: KSM

Sir Benedict Obidinma Odinamadu (14 July 1927 – 8 November 1979) was a Nigerian civil servant. He was private secretary to Nnamdi Azikiwe and Michael Okpara during their respective terms as Premier of the Eastern Region, and later served as First Secretary to the Military Government of Colonel Chukwuemeka Odumegwu Ojukwu.

== Biography ==
He was born in Abatete town in Idemili North Local Government Area of Anambra State of Nigeria on 14 July 1927. He was the first son of Mr. John Chukwuemeka Odinamadu and Mrs. Lucy Odinamadu née Oranu, both of Abatete.

=== Education ===
Odinamadu grew up in Nigeria Police Force barracks in Onitsha, Bansara, Ikom, Nsukka and Enugu, where his father was posted. He attended St. Joseph's Catholic School, Nsukka, and St. Patrick's Catholic School, Ogbete, Enugu, for his elementary education, and Christ the King College, Onitsha, for his secondary education. He then studied at University College, Ibadan, and in 1956 graduated with second-class honors (upper division) in History and Political Thought, with a degree from the University of London.

From 1960 to 1966, he took administrative management courses in Washington, D.C., Ottawa, Puerto Rico and the Caribbean.

From 1964 to 1965, he studied regional development in southern Italy and attended the Economic Development Institute of the International Bank for Reconstruction and Development (World Bank) in Washington, D.C., and was elected a fellow of the institute.

=== Career ===
He was private secretary to Nnamdi Azikiwe and Michael I. Okpara during their respective terms as Premier of the Eastern Region.

In 1964, he served on the board of directors Calabar Cement Co. Ltd.

In 1965, he was promoted to the position of permanent secretary. In 1966, he became the First Secretary to the Military Government of Colonel Chukwuemeka Odumegwu Ojukwu. Subsequently, he became the permanent secretary of the Ministry of Information during the tense period of negotiations for unity and indivisibility of Nigeria at Aburi, Ghana. Afterwards, Permanent Secretary of Ministry of Education (1966)

In 1967, Odinamadu was appointed Secretary/Chief Executive of the Petroleum Management Board. This body was set up by Colonel Chukwuemeka Odumegwu Ojukwu to take charge and manage Shell B.P. assets for the Republic of Biafra. He held this post until the end of the Nigeria-Biafra civil war. He also served as Permanent Secretary of Ministry of Information, Ministry of Education etc.

After the Nigeria-Biafra civil war, he continued to serve as Permanent Secretary in the Ministries of Health, Agriculture, Trade and Transport etc. until 1975. Some of his postings earned him the nickname "Crisis Permsec".

He was the Chairman of Co-operative Bank of Eastern Nigeria in 1974.

In 1975, after the coup d'état that removed General Gowon as Head of State and installed the late General Murtala Muhammed, Odinamadu was dismissed by Colonel Anthony Aboki Ochefu during the purge that followed that coup. No reason for the dismissal.

Between October 1975 and December 1977, he appeared before eight Commissions of Inquiry and Assets Commission of Inquiry. All returned the same favorable verdict; that Ben Odinamadu was a man of integrity.

In September 1979, the dismissal order was lifted by a decision of the Supreme Military Council and his retirement benefits (gratuity and pension) were paid in full.

Moral revolution has become necessary because no nation can prosper socially, politically or economically when its society is morally weak.

— Ben Odinamadu

=== Marriage and family ===
He married Oyibo Ekwulo Akwuba in September 1957. She died on 30 March 2022. They had four children – two boys and two girls: Kenneth Osita Odinamadu, Ijeoma Emejulu (Mrs.), Emeka Odinamadu and Ifeatu Onubogu (Mrs.).

=== Private entrepreneurship ===
He started the Pelican Transport Company for Road Haulage and the John Kenneth Nigeria Limited for importation of goods.

=== Political party activities ===
In 1978, he joined the Unity Party of Nigeria led by Chief Obafemi Awolowo (now late).

=== Recognitions ===
He was installed as member of the Order of the Knighthood of St. Mulumba (KSM) in 1978 by His Lordship the Most Reverend M.A. Eneja.

=== Literary interests ===
Odinamadu's essays were published posthumously in 1980 by his widow Oyibo Ekwulo Odinamadu in a book entitled: POLITICS AND THE IGBO ELITE. He published an article in the Newspaper Daily Star 4 Nov 1978: The Dilemma of the Igbo Political Elite

=== Leisure activities ===
Odinamadu played chess, lawn tennis, draughts and Scrabble, and was a swimmer. He was a member of the Enugu Sports Club and a supporter of Rangers International Football Club of Enugu. He was also a member of Rotary Club International, Enugu, and became president of the Enugu club in 1977.

=== Chieftaincy titles ===
He was a member of the prestigious Nze na OZO Society. His social name was NNABUENYI.
