= François Brient =

French cyclist

Personal information
- Born: 1 June 1901
- Died: 14 November 1979 (aged 78)

Cycling career
- Sport: Cycling
- Discipline: Road
- Role: Rider

François Brient (1 June 1901 – 14 November 1979) was a French racing cyclist. He rode in the 1924 Tour de France.
