= Percy Evans (footballer) =

Australian rules footballer, born 1906

Personal information
- Full name: Percy Evans
- Born: 11 August 1906
- Died: 20 November 1979 (aged 73)

Playing career^{1}
Years	Club	Games (Goals)
1929	North Melbourne	2 (0)
- ^{1} Playing statistics correct to the end of 1929.

Percy Evans (11 August 1906 – 20 November 1979) was an Australian rules footballer who played with North Melbourne in the Victorian Football League (VFL).
