= Robert Barr MacGregor =

British physician (1896–19790

Robert Barr MacGregor CMG FRCPED DTM&H
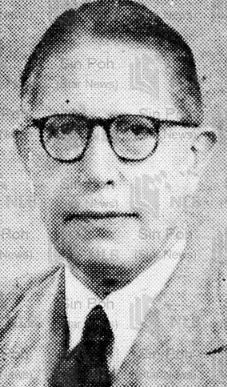
- MacGregor in 1950
- Born: 14 July 1896
- Died: 9 November 1979 (aged 83)
- Education: University of Edinburgh
- Occupations: Physician and chief medical officer
- Years active: 1920–1975
- Children: 1 son

Robert Barr MacGregor (14 July 1896 – 9 November 1979) was a British physician and senior medical officer who served as Director of Medical Services of the Straits Settlements and Director of Medical Services of the Federation of Malaya.

== Early life and education ==
MacGregor was born on 14 July 1896, the son of Patrick MacGregor. He was educated at Dunbar School and Edinburgh University where he graduated in medicine in 1918. In 1930, he took the MRCP(Ed) qualification and membership of the Royal Colleges of Physicians. In 1954, he was elected FRCP(Ed).

== Career ==
MacGregor joined the Royal Army Medical Corps after graduating and served from 1918–1920. In 1920, he joined the Colonial Medical Service, and served in many different posts in the Straits Settlements and the Federated Malay States. At the time, medical care and preventative medicine was undeveloped, and he played an important role in modernising health services in Malaya. In 1938, while serving as acting Director and Adviser Medical Services, he issued the first general survey, in a single report, of the health conditions in the Straits Settlements, the Federated Malay States and the Unfederated Malay States.

In 1940, he was appointed Director, Medical Services, Straits Settlements in Singapore and Adviser, Medical Services, Malay Straits, and was appointed a member of the Legislative Council. In 1942, he was interned as a POW by the Japanese for three and a half years in Changi Prison, Singapore.

After the Second World War, he returned to his previous post as Director of Medical Services, and assisted in the recovery of medical services in Malaya. In 1948, he was appointed a member of the Federal Legislative Council. His last post before he retired from the Colonial Medical Service in 1951 was as Director, Medical Services of the Federation of Malaya. In a report in 1950 on the work of the Medical Department, he stated that the incidence of malaria in Malaya had been considerably reduced due to research into drugs for treatment and active anti-malarial control measures. He remained in Malaya until 1958 working as senior medical officer at Malacca Agricultural Medical Board which supervised health care for labour employed on rubber estates.

In 1958, he retired to the Scottish borders, and when his wife died in 1964, took up the position of medical officer at Wooley Hospital, Hexham. From 1967–1975, he served as ship’s surgeon with British India Line and then with Royal Fleet Auxiliary with NATO.

== Personal life and death ==
MacGregor married Helen Harper in 1921, and they had a son. After the death of his first wife in 1964, he married Edith Rushbrooke in 1970.

MacGregor died on 9 November 1979 as a result of a road accident, aged 83.

== Honours ==
MacGregor was awarded the King George V Silver Jubilee Medal in 1935. He appointed Companion of the Order of St Michael and St George (CMG) in the 1946 New Year Honours. In 1951, he was appointed Commander of the Venerable Order of the Hospital of St John of Jerusalem.
