= Hisa Sawada =

Japanese politician

- 沢田 ひさ

Member of the House of Representatives
- In office 10 April 1946 – 31 March 1947
- Preceded by: Constituency established
- Succeeded by: Multi-member district
- Constituency: Mie at-large

Personal details
- Born: 25 November 1897 Tsuchiyama, Shiga, Japan
- Died: 9 November 1979 (aged 81)
- Party: Socialist
- Other party: Right Socialist (1953)

Hisa Sawada (Japanese: 沢田ひさ; 25 November 1897 – 9 November 1979) was a Japanese suffragist and politician. She was one of the first group of women elected to the House of Representatives in 1946.

== Biography ==
Sawada was born in 1897 and was from Tsuchiyama in Shiga Prefecture. After marrying she moved to Kuwana in Mie Prefecture. She became a leader of the women's suffrage movement and chaired the Chūbu Women's Suffrage Acquisition League.

After World War II, Sawada joined the Japan Socialist Party and became head of its women's section in Kuwana. She was a JSP candidate in Mie in the 1946 general elections (the first in which women could vote), and was elected to the House of Representatives. After losing her seat in the 1947 elections, she was a candidate for the Rightist Socialist Party in the 1953 House of Councillors elections, finishing second behind Hiroya Ino with 28% of the vote.

She died in 1979.
