= Willem Nieuwenkamp =

Dutch geologist and professor

Willem Nieuwenkamp (1 January 1903 – 12 November 1979) was a Dutch geologist and professor at the University of Utrecht. He was among the early pioneers to apply X-ray crystallography in geology. He also contributed to studies on geochemistry, petrology and chemical cycling. After his retirement, he also contributed to studies on the history and philosophy of geology.

Nieuwenkamp was born in Lunteren to artist and scholar Wijnand Otto Jan and Ann Wilbrink. Educated at Lunteren, Edam, and Hoorn he then joined the University of Utrecht where he studied geology from 1919 although he was also interested in astronomy. He worked briefly as an assistant to L.M.R. Rutten and after his master's degree (1926) he joined petrol company Solana for a survey in Patagonia. He then worked with J.M. Bijvoet and received a doctorate from the University of Utrecht for X-ray crystallography studies of lead bromide and lead fluobromide. He then became an assistant to J.I.J.M. Schmutzer and was involved in surveys for ores in Limburg. He then worked on geochemistry with V.M. Goldschmidt at the University of Göttingen in 1933 and became a lecturer at the University of Utrecht in 1937. He examined gravimetric and magnetometric data along with F.A. Vening Meinesz obtained by submarine surveys and hoped to examine continental drift ideas. In 1947 he succeeded Schmutzer as professor of mineralogy, a position he held until 1968. Among Nieuwenkamp's works was an examination of sodium in the oceans and rocks and ideas on the cycling of elements and denudation of continents. His later works were on the history of petrogenesis theories, including and examination of ideas from James Hutton and Leopold von Buch.
