= 1936–37 Detroit Red Wings season =

Sports season

1936–37 Detroit Red Wings
- Stanley Cup champions
- Division: 1st American
- 1936–37 record: 25–14–9
- Home record: 14–5–5
- Road record: 11–9–4
- Goals for: 128
- Goals against: 102

Team information
- General manager: Jack Adams
- Coach: Jack Adams
- Captain: Doug Young
- Arena: Olympia Stadium

Team leaders
- Goals: Larry Aurie (23)
- Assists: Marty Barry (27)
- Points: Marty Barry (44)
- Penalty minutes: Ebbie Goodfellow
- Wins: Normie Smith (25)
- Goals against average: Normie Smith (2.05)

The 1936–37 Detroit Red Wings season was the 11th season for the Detroit franchise in the National Hockey League (NHL) and the fifth operating as the Red Wings. In their 10th season under head coach Jack Adams, the Red Wings compiled a 25–14–9 record, the Red Wings finished first in the American Division and won the Stanley Cup championship. The Wings scored 128 goals, the most in the NHL, and gave up 102 goals by opponents. The team played its home games at Olympia Stadium in Detroit.

In the Stanley Cup semifinals, the Wings defeated the Montreal Canadiens, three games to two. In the 1937 Stanley Cup Finals, the Wings defeated the New York Rangers, three games to two. It was the Red Wings' second consecutive Stanley Cup championship.

Although Defenceman Doug Young was originally the team captain, Herbie Lewis, arguably the team's best player, was eventually chosen as team captain, and led the Red Wings down the stretch to their second Stanley Cup in as many years. The team's statistical leaders included Larry Aurie with 23 goals, Marty Barry and 27 assists and 44 points scored, and Ebbie Goodfellow with 43 penalty minutes. Aurie's 23 goals tied for the most in the NHL during the 1936–37 season, and Barry's 27 assists were second most in the league. Normie Smith was the team's goaltender in all 48 games. Smith's 25 wins as goaltender led the NHL during the 1936–37 season, and his 2,980 minutes in goal were the second most in the league.

Four members of the team have been inducted into the Hockey Hall of Fame: Ebbie Goodfellow (inducted in 1963); Syd Howe (inducted 1965); Marty Barry (inducted 1965); and Herbie Lewis (inducted 1989).

== Regular season ==
=== Final standings ===
American Division
	GP	W	L	T	GF	GA	PTS
**Detroit Red Wings**	48	25	14	9	128	102	59
**Boston Bruins**	48	23	18	7	120	110	53
**New York Rangers**	48	19	20	9	117	106	47
Chicago Black Hawks	48	14	27	7	99	131	35

Note: GP = Games Played, W = Wins, L = Losses, T = Ties, Pts = Points, GF = Goals For, GA = Goals Against
Teams that qualified for the playoffs are highlighted in bold.

=== Record vs. opponents ===
==== Vs. American Division ====
1936–37 NHL records
Team	**BOS**	**CHI**	**DET**	**NYR**	**Total**
Boston	—	5–2–1	1–7	3–2–3	**9–11–4**
Chicago	2–5–1	—	2–5–1	4–3–1	**8–13–3**
Detroit	7–1	5–2–1	—	5–1–2	**17–4–3**
N.Y. Rangers	2–3–3	3–4–1	1–5–2	—	**6–12–6**

==== Vs. Canadian Division ====
1936–37 NHL records
Team	**MTL**	**MTM**	**NYA**	**TOR**	**Total**
Boston	2–3–1	5–1	4–1–1	3–2–1	**14–7–3**
Chicago	2–4	0–6	3–1–2	1–3–2	**6–14–4**
Detroit	1–4–1	2–1–3	2–3–1	3–2–1	**8–10–6**
N.Y. Rangers	2–3–1	2–2–2	4–2	5–1	**13–8–3**

== Schedule and results ==
1936–37 regular season
November

Game	Result	Date	Score	Opponent	Record
1	W	November 5, 1936	3–1	@ Toronto Maple Leafs (1936–37)	1–0–0
2	W	November 8, 1936	5–2	New York Rangers (1936–37)	2–0–0
3	T	November 14, 1936	2–2 OT	@ Montreal Maroons (1936–37)	2–0–1
4	T	November 15, 1936	2–2 OT	Montreal Maroons (1936–37)	2–0–2
5	L	November 19, 1936	0–1	@ New York Rangers (1936–37)	2–1–2
6	W	November 22, 1936	4–2	Toronto Maple Leafs (1936–37)	3–1–2
7	L	November 26, 1936	0–2	Chicago Black Hawks (1936–37)	3–2–2
8	L	November 29, 1936	0–2	New York Americans (1936–37)	3–3–2

December

Game	Result	Date	Score	Opponent	Record
9	W	December 3, 1936	2–0	New York Rangers (1936–37)	4–3–2
10	T	December 6, 1936	3–3 OT	@ New York Americans (1936–37)	4–3–3
11	W	December 8, 1936	4–3	@ Boston Bruins (1936–37)	5–3–3
12	W	December 10, 1936	2–1	Montreal Canadiens (1936–37)	6–3–3
13	W	December 13, 1936	2–1 OT	@ Chicago Black Hawks (1936–37)	7–3–3
14	L	December 15, 1936	3–4	@ Montreal Canadiens (1936–37)	7–4–3
15	W	December 20, 1936	4–3	Boston Bruins (1936–37)	8–4–3
16	T	December 25, 1936	1–1 OT	Chicago Black Hawks (1936–37)	8–4–4
17	L	December 27, 1936	2–5	Montreal Canadiens (1936–37)	8–5–4
18	W	December 31, 1936	4–2	New York Americans (1936–37)	9–5–4

January

Game	Result	Date	Score	Opponent	Record
19	L	January 1, 1937	2–4	@ Chicago Black Hawks (1936–37)	9–6–4
20	W	January 3, 1937	4–2	Toronto Maple Leafs (1936–37)	10–6–4
21	W	January 5, 1937	3–2	@ Boston Bruins (1936–37)	11–6–4
22	W	January 7, 1937	4–2	@ New York Americans (1936–37)	12–6–4
23	W	January 10, 1937	4–2	Boston Bruins (1936–37)	13–6–4
24	L	January 12, 1937	1–4	@ Montreal Canadiens (1936–37)	13–7–4
25	W	January 14, 1937	2–0	@ New York Rangers (1936–37)	14–7–4
26	W	January 17, 1937	2–0	@ Chicago Black Hawks (1936–37)	15–7–4
27	W	January 19, 1937	7–2	Chicago Black Hawks (1936–37)	16–7–4
28	T	January 23, 1937	1–1 OT	@ Montreal Maroons (1936–37)	16–7–5
29	W	January 24, 1937	2–1	Montreal Maroons (1936–37)	17–7–5
30	W	January 31, 1937	2–1	@ Boston Bruins (1936–37)	18–7–5

February

Game	Result	Date	Score	Opponent	Record
31	T	February 2, 1937	4–4 OT	@ New York Rangers (1936–37)	18–7–6
32	T	February 4, 1937	2–2 OT	New York Rangers (1936–37)	18–7–7
33	W	February 7, 1937	8–0	Boston Bruins (1936–37)	19–7–7
34	L	February 9, 1937	2–3	@ New York Americans (1936–37)	19–8–7
35	L	February 11, 1937	2–3	@ Montreal Canadiens (1936–37)	19–9–7
36	T	February 14, 1937	3–3 OT	Toronto Maple Leafs (1936–37)	19–9–8
37	L	February 18, 1937	1–3	@ Toronto Maple Leafs (1936–37)	19–10–8
38	W	February 21, 1937	6–0	Chicago Black Hawks (1936–37)	20–10–8
39	W	February 25, 1937	3–1	@ Chicago Black Hawks (1936–37)	21–10–8
40	T	February 28, 1937	0–0 OT	Montreal Canadiens (1936–37)	21–10–9

March

Game	Result	Date	Score	Opponent	Record
41	W	March 2, 1937	7–4	@ Montreal Maroons (1936–37)	22–10–9
42	W	March 4, 1937	2–1	New York Rangers (1936–37)	23–10–9
43	L	March 7, 1937	1–3	New York Americans (1936–37)	23–11–9
44	L	March 9, 1937	1–6	@ Boston Bruins (1936–37)	23–12–9
45	W	March 11, 1937	4–2	@ New York Rangers (1936–37)	24–12–9
46	W	March 14, 1937	2–1	Boston Bruins (1936–37)	25–12–9
47	L	March 20, 1937	2–3	@ Toronto Maple Leafs (1936–37)	25–13–9
48	L	March 21, 1937	1–5	Montreal Maroons (1936–37)	25–14–9

Legend: Win (2 points) Loss (0 points) Tie (1 point)

== Playoffs ==
=== (C1) Montreal Canadiens vs. (A1) Detroit Red Wings ===
Detroit Red Wings vs Montreal Canadiens
Date	Visitors	Score	Home	Score
Mar 23	Montreal C.	0	Detroit	4
Mar 25	Montreal C.	1	Detroit	5
Mar 27	Detroit	1	Montreal C.	3
Mar 30	Detroit	1	Montreal C.	3
Apr 1	Detroit	2	Montreal C.	1 (3OT)

Detroit wins best-of-five series 3–2.

=== (A1) Detroit Red Wings vs. (A3) New York Rangers ===
New York Rangers vs Detroit Red Wings
Date	Visitors	Score	Home	Score
Apr 6	Detroit	1	New York R.	5
Apr 8	New York R.	2	Detroit	4
Apr 11	New York R.	1	Detroit	0
Apr 13	New York R.	0	Detroit	1
Apr 15	New York R.	0	Detroit	3

Detroit wins the Stanley Cup 3–2.

== Player statistics ==
=== Regular season ===
Scoring

Player	Pos	GP	G	A	Pts	PIM
Marty Barry	C	47	17	27	44	6
Larry Aurie	RW	45	23	20	43	20
Herbie Lewis	LW	45	14	18	32	14
Syd Howe	C/LW	45	17	10	27	10
Ebbie Goodfellow	C/D	48	9	16	25	43
John Sorrell	LW	48	8	16	24	4
Gord Pettinger	C	48	7	15	22	13
Wally Kilrea	RW/C	47	8	13	21	6
Mud Bruneteau	RW	42	9	7	16	18
Hec Kilrea	LW	48	6	9	15	20
Pete Kelly	RW	47	5	4	9	12
Bucko McDonald	D	47	3	5	8	20
Rolly Roulston**	LW/D	21	0	5	5	10
John Gallagher	D	11	1	0	1	4
Howie Mackie	RW/D	13	1	0	1	4
Ralph Bowman	D	37	0	1	1	24
Jimmy Orlando	D	9	0	1	1	8
Don Deacon	LW	4	0	0	0	2
John Sherf	LW	1	0	0	0	0
Normie Smith	G	48	0	0	0	0
Burr Williams	D	2	0	0	0	4
Doug Young*	D	11	0	0	0	6

Goaltending

Player	MIN	GP	W	L	T	GA	GAA	SO
Normie Smith	2980	48	25	14	9	102	2.05	6
Team:	2980	48	25	14	9	102	2.05	6

=== Playoffs ===
Scoring

Player	Pos	GP	G	A	Pts	PIM
Marty Barry	C	10	4	7	11	2
Herbie Lewis	LW	10	4	3	7	4
Syd Howe	C/LW	10	2	5	7	0
John Sorrell	LW	10	2	4	6	2
Hec Kilrea	LW	10	3	1	4	2
Ebbie Goodfellow	C/D	9	2	2	4	12
Mud Bruneteau	RW	10	2	0	2	6
Pete Kelly	RW	8	2	0	2	0
Wally Kilrea	RW/C	10	0	2	2	4
Gord Pettinger	C	10	0	2	2	2
John Gallagher	D	10	1	0	1	17
Ralph Bowman	D	10	0	1	1	4
John Sherf	LW	5	0	1	1	2
Jimmy Franks	G	1	0	0	0	0
Howie Mackie	RW/D	8	0	0	0	0
Bucko McDonald	D	10	0	0	0	2
Earl Robertson	G	6	0	0	0	0
Normie Smith	G	5	0	0	0	0

Goaltending

Player	MIN	GP	W	L	GA	GAA	SO
Earl Robertson	340	6	3	2	8	1.41	2
Normie Smith	282	5	3	1	6	1.28	1
Jimmy Franks	30	1	0	1	2	4.00	0
Team:	652	10	6	4	16	1.47	3

- *Doug Young was the Captain, but spent most of the injured. Ebbie Goodfellow served as captain in his place.
- **Orville "Rolly" Roulston also missed most of the season injured.

Note: Pos = Position; GP = Games played; G = Goals; A = Assists; Pts = Points; PIM = Penalty minutes; PPG = Power-play goals; SHG = Short-handed goals; GWG = Game-winning goals
MIN = Minutes played; W = Wins; L = Losses; T = Ties; GA = Goals-against; GAA = Goals-against average; SO = Shutouts;

== See also ==
- 1936–37 NHL season
