= 1936–37 Montreal Canadiens season =

NHL hockey team season

1936–37 Montreal Canadiens
- O'Brien Trophy winners
- Division: 1st Canadian
- 1936–37 record: 24–18–6
- Home record: 16–8–0
- Road record: 8–10–6
- Goals for: 115
- Goals against: 111

Team information
- General manager: Cecil Hart
- Coach: Cecil Hart
- Captain: Babe Siebert
- Arena: Montreal Forum

Team leaders
- Goals: Johnny Gagnon (20)
- Assists: Babe Siebert (20)
- Points: Johnny Gagnon (36)
- Penalty minutes: Johnny Gagnon; Babe Siebert (38)
- Wins: Wilf Cude (22)
- Goals against average: Wilf Cude (2.18)

The 1936–37 Montreal Canadiens season was the team's 28th season of play. After coach Cecil Hart and Howie Morenz returned to the club, the Canadiens placed first in the Canadian Division and qualified for the playoffs. Montreal met and lost to eventual Stanley Cup champion Detroit Red Wings in the semi-finals.

== Regular season ==
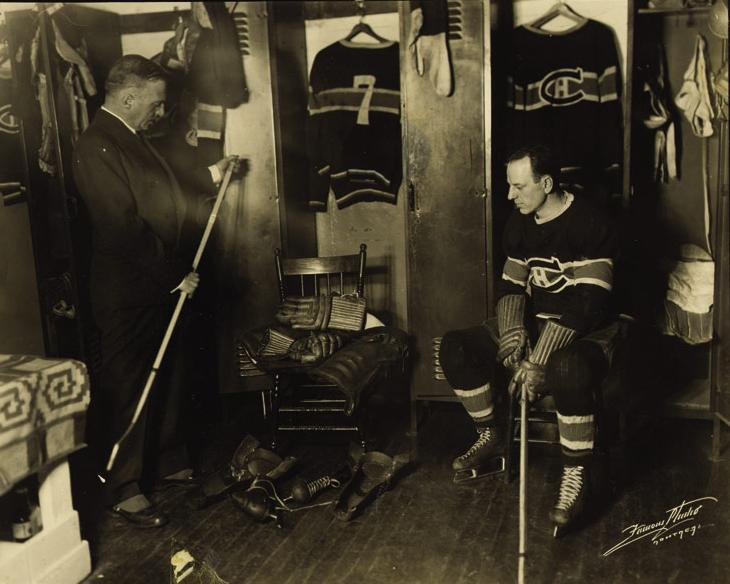
Manager Hart and team-mate Aurele Joliat in the Canadiens' dressing room after learning of Morenz' death.

The Montreal Canadiens had hit the bottom in 1935–36, and Babe Siebert was obtained to shore up the defence. Cecil Hart was rehired as coach. Hart placed a condition on his returning to the club, that former star Howie Morenz would return to the club. After being traded to Chicago and from there to New York, Morenz had struggled and the Rangers were willing trade partners for Morenz. Goalie George Hainsworth also returned to the Canadiens, signed as a free agent.

The Canadiens went from last to first in the Canadian Division. Morenz was just hitting his stride in January 1937, when tragedy struck. On one of his hurtling rushes, he was being checked by Earl Seibert of Chicago when his left skate got caught in the dasher of the end boards, and Morenz suffered a badly fractured leg. After suffering a nervous breakdown worrying about if he would be able to come back, more bad luck occurred. On March 8, 1937, X-rays revealed that Morenz had blood clots in his healing leg. An operation was scheduled for the next day, but when Morenz ate a light supper and told the nurse he wanted to rest, in falling asleep his pallor suddenly changed and the nurse knew something was wrong. A blood clot had stopped his heart, and attempts to revive Morenz failed. News of Morenz's death shocked the hockey world, and thousands filed past his bier, many in tears, to pay their last respects.

=== Final standings ===
Canadian Division
| | GP | W | L | T | GF | GA | PTS |
|---|---|---|---|---|---|---|---|
| **Montreal Canadiens** | 48 | 24 | 18 | 6 | 115 | 111 | 54 |
| **Montreal Maroons** | 48 | 22 | 17 | 9 | 126 | 110 | 53 |
| **Toronto Maple Leafs** | 48 | 22 | 21 | 5 | 119 | 115 | 49 |
| New York Americans | 48 | 15 | 29 | 4 | 122 | 161 | 34 |

Note: W = Wins, L = Losses, T = Ties, GF = Goals For, GA = Goals Against, Pts = Points
Teams that qualified for the playoffs are highlighted in bold.

=== Record vs. opponents ===
==== Vs. Canadian Division ====
1936–37 NHL records
| Team | **MTL** | **MTM** | **NYA** | **TOR** | **Total** |
|---|---|---|---|---|---|
| M. Canadiens | — | 2–3–3 | 6–2 | 2–6 | **10–11–3** |
| M. Maroons | 3–2–3 | — | 5–3 | 4–3–1 | **12–8–4** |
| N.Y. Americans | 2–6 | 3–5 | — | 3–5 | **8–16–0** |
| Toronto | 6–2 | 3–4–1 | 5–3 | — | **14–9–1** |

==== Vs. American Division ====
1936–37 NHL records
| Team | **BOS** | **CHI** | **DET** | **NYR** | **Total** |
|---|---|---|---|---|---|
| M. Canadiens | 3–2–1 | 4–2 | 4–1–1 | 3–2–1 | **14–7–3** |
| M. Maroons | 1–5 | 6–0 | 1–2–3 | 2–2–2 | **10–9–5** |
| N.Y. Americans | 1–4–1 | 1–3–2 | 3–2–1 | 2–4 | **7–13–4** |
| Toronto | 2–3–1 | 3–1–2 | 2–3–1 | 1–5 | **8–12–4** |

== Playoffs ==
As champions of the Canadian division, the Canadiens proceeded directly to the semi-final against the Detroit Red Wings. Montreal lost the best-of-five series 3–2.

== Schedule and results ==
=== Regular season ===
1936–37 regular season
November

| Game | Result | Date | Score | Opponent | Record |
|---|---|---|---|---|---|
| 1 | W | November 7, 1936 | 2–0 | Boston Bruins (1936–37) | 1–0–0 |
| 2 | W | November 12, 1936 | 2–1 | Montreal Maroons (1936–37) | 2–0–0 |
| 3 | L | November 15, 1936 | 1–2 | @ Boston Bruins (1936–37) | 2–1–0 |
| 4 | L | November 17, 1936 | 2–5 | @ New York Americans (1936–37) | 2–2–0 |
| 5 | W | November 19, 1936 | 3–2 | New York Americans (1936–37) | 3–2–0 |
| 6 | W | November 21, 1936 | 3–1 OT | New York Rangers (1936–37) | 4–2–0 |
| 7 | T | November 24, 1936 | 2–2 OT | @ Montreal Maroons (1936–37) | 4–2–1 |
| 8 | L | November 26, 1936 | 2–4 | Toronto Maple Leafs (1936–37) | 4–3–1 |
| 9 | L | November 28, 1936 | 2–4 | @ Toronto Maple Leafs (1936–37) | 4–4–1 |
| 10 | W | November 29, 1936 | 2–1 | @ Chicago Black Hawks (1936–37) | 5–4–1 |

December

| Game | Result | Date | Score | Opponent | Record |
|---|---|---|---|---|---|
| 11 | W | December 5, 1936 | 4–3 | Boston Bruins (1936–37) | 6–4–1 |
| 12 | L | December 10, 1936 | 1–2 | @ Detroit Red Wings (1936–37) | 6–5–1 |
| 13 | T | December 12, 1936 | 2–2 OT | @ Montreal Maroons (1936–37) | 6–5–2 |
| 14 | W | December 15, 1936 | 4–3 | Detroit Red Wings (1936–37) | 7–5–2 |
| 15 | W | December 19, 1936 | 4–2 OT | New York Rangers (1936–37) | 8–5–2 |
| 16 | L | December 20, 1936 | 3–5 OT | @ New York Rangers (1936–37) | 8–6–2 |
| 17 | W | December 22, 1936 | 4–1 | Chicago Black Hawks (1936–37) | 9–6–2 |
| 18 | W | December 27, 1936 | 5–2 | @ Detroit Red Wings (1936–37) | 10–6–2 |
| 19 | L | December 29, 1936 | 1–5 | @ Chicago Black Hawks (1936–37) | 10–7–2 |

January

| Game | Result | Date | Score | Opponent | Record |
|---|---|---|---|---|---|
| 20 | W | January 2, 1937 | 5–1 | New York Americans (1936–37) | 11–7–2 |
| 21 | W | January 3, 1937 | 4–2 | @ New York Americans (1936–37) | 12–7–2 |
| 22 | L | January 5, 1937 | 2–4 | @ Montreal Maroons (1936–37) | 12–8–2 |
| 23 | W | January 7, 1937 | 4–1 | Toronto Maple Leafs (1936–37) | 13–8–2 |
| 24 | L | January 9, 1937 | 1–2 | @ Toronto Maple Leafs (1936–37) | 13–9–2 |
| 25 | W | January 12, 1937 | 4–1 | Detroit Red Wings (1936–37) | 14–9–2 |
| 26 | W | January 16, 1937 | 5–0 | Montreal Maroons (1936–37) | 15–9–2 |
| 27 | T | January 19, 1937 | 1–1 OT | @ New York Rangers (1936–37) | 15–9–3 |
| 28 | W | January 24, 1937 | 4–1 | @ Chicago Black Hawks (1936–37) | 16–9–3 |
| 29 | W | January 26, 1937 | 3–1 | @ Toronto Maple Leafs (1936–37) | 17–9–3 |
| 30 | W | January 28, 1937 | 6–5 | Chicago Black Hawks (1936–37) | 18–9–3 |
| 31 | L | January 30, 1937 | 0–4 | New York Americans (1936–37) | 18–10–3 |
| 32 | W | January 31, 1937 | 3–2 OT | @ New York Americans (1936–37) | 19–10–3 |

February

| Game | Result | Date | Score | Opponent | Record |
|---|---|---|---|---|---|
| 33 | W | February 2, 1937 | 1–0 | @ Boston Bruins (1936–37) | 20–10–3 |
| 34 | L | February 4, 1937 | 2–6 | Boston Bruins (1936–37) | 20–11–3 |
| 35 | W | February 11, 1937 | 3–2 | Detroit Red Wings (1936–37) | 21–11–3 |
| 36 | L | February 13, 1937 | 1–5 | Montreal Maroons (1936–37) | 21–12–3 |
| 37 | W | February 16, 1937 | 2–1 | @ New York Americans (1936–37) | 22–12–3 |
| 38 | T | February 21, 1937 | 2–2 OT | @ Boston Bruins (1936–37) | 22–12–4 |
| 39 | L | February 25, 1937 | 1–3 | Toronto Maple Leafs (1936–37) | 22–13–4 |
| 40 | W | February 27, 1937 | 3–2 OT | New York Americans (1936–37) | 23–13–4 |
| 41 | T | February 28, 1937 | 0–0 OT | @ Detroit Red Wings (1936–37) | 23–13–5 |

March

| Game | Result | Date | Score | Opponent | Record |
|---|---|---|---|---|---|
| 42 | L | March 4, 1937 | 3–5 | Chicago Black Hawks (1936–37) | 23–14–5 |
| 43 | L | March 6, 1937 | 1–3 OT | @ Toronto Maple Leafs (1936–37) | 23–15–5 |
| 44 | L | March 9, 1937 | 1–4 | Montreal Maroons (1936–37) | 23–16–5 |
| 45 | W | March 13, 1937 | 1–0 | New York Rangers (1936–37) | 24–16–5 |
| 46 | T | March 16, 1937 | 1–1 OT | @ Montreal Maroons (1936–37) | 24–16–6 |
| 47 | L | March 18, 1937 | 1–2 | Toronto Maple Leafs (1936–37) | 24–17–6 |
| 48 | L | March 21, 1937 | 1–3 | @ New York Rangers (1936–37) | 24–18–6 |

Legend: Win (2 points) Loss (0 points) Tie (1 point)

== Player statistics ==
=== Regular season ===
==== Scoring ====
| Player | Pos | GP | G | A | Pts | PIM |
|---|---|---|---|---|---|---|
| Johnny Gagnon | RW | 48 | 20 | 16 | 36 | 38 |
| Aurel Joliat | LW | 47 | 17 | 15 | 32 | 30 |
| Babe Siebert | LW/D | 44 | 8 | 20 | 28 | 38 |
| Georges Mantha | D/LW | 47 | 13 | 14 | 27 | 17 |
| Paul Haynes | C | 47 | 8 | 18 | 26 | 24 |
| Toe Blake | LW | 43 | 10 | 12 | 22 | 12 |
| Howie Morenz | C | 30 | 4 | 16 | 20 | 12 |
| Joffre Desilets | RW | 48 | 7 | 12 | 19 | 17 |
| Pit Lepine | C | 34 | 7 | 8 | 15 | 15 |
| George Brown | C | 27 | 4 | 6 | 10 | 10 |
| Rod Lorrain | RW | 47 | 3 | 6 | 9 | 8 |
| Jack McGill | LW | 44 | 5 | 2 | 7 | 9 |
| Bill MacKenzie | D | 39 | 4 | 3 | 7 | 22 |
| Bill Miller | C/D | 48 | 3 | 1 | 4 | 12 |
| Walt Buswell | D | 44 | 0 | 4 | 4 | 30 |
| Armand Mondou | LW | 7 | 1 | 1 | 2 | 0 |
| Paul Runge | C/LW | 4 | 1 | 0 | 1 | 2 |
| Wilf Cude | G | 44 | 0 | 0 | 0 | 0 |
| Polly Drouin | LW | 4 | 0 | 0 | 0 | 0 |
| Red Goupille | D | 4 | 0 | 0 | 0 | 0 |
| George Hainsworth | G | 4 | 0 | 0 | 0 | 0 |
| Roger Jenkins | RW/D | 10 | 0 | 0 | 0 | 8 |

Goaltending

| Player | MIN | GP | W | L | T | GA | GAA | SO |
|---|---|---|---|---|---|---|---|---|
| Wilf Cude | 2730 | 44 | 22 | 17 | 5 | 99 | 2.18 | 5 |
| George Hainsworth | 270 | 4 | 2 | 1 | 1 | 12 | 2.67 | 0 |
| Team: | 3000 | 48 | 24 | 18 | 6 | 111 | 2.22 | 5 |

=== Playoffs ===
==== Scoring ====
| Player | Pos | GP | G | A | Pts | PIM |
|---|---|---|---|---|---|---|
| Paul Haynes | C | 5 | 2 | 3 | 5 | 0 |
| Johnny Gagnon | RW | 5 | 2 | 1 | 3 | 9 |
| Babe Siebert | LW/D | 5 | 1 | 2 | 3 | 2 |
| Aurel Joliat | LW | 5 | 0 | 3 | 3 | 2 |
| Toe Blake | LW | 5 | 1 | 0 | 1 | 0 |
| Joffre Desilets | RW | 5 | 1 | 0 | 1 | 0 |
| Bill MacKenzie | D | 5 | 1 | 0 | 1 | 0 |
| Pit Lepine | C | 5 | 0 | 1 | 1 | 0 |
| George Brown | C | 4 | 0 | 0 | 0 | 0 |
| Walt Buswell | D | 5 | 0 | 0 | 0 | 2 |
| Wilf Cude | G | 5 | 0 | 0 | 0 | 0 |
| Rod Lorrain | RW | 5 | 0 | 0 | 0 | 0 |
| Georges Mantha | D/LW | 5 | 0 | 0 | 0 | 0 |
| Jack McGill | LW | 1 | 0 | 0 | 0 | 0 |
| Bill Miller | C/D | 5 | 0 | 0 | 0 | 0 |
| Armand Mondou | LW | 5 | 0 | 0 | 0 | 0 |

==== Goaltending ====
| Player | MIN | GP | W | L | GA | GAA | SO |
|---|---|---|---|---|---|---|---|
| Wilf Cude | 352 | 5 | 2 | 3 | 13 | 2.22 | 0 |
| Team: | 352 | 5 | 2 | 3 | 13 | 2.22 | 0 |

Note:

Pos = Position;GP = Games played; G = Goals; A = Assists; Pts = Points; PIM = Penalty minutes; +/- = Plus/minus; PPG = Power-play goals; SHG = Short-handed goals; GWG = Game-winning goals
Pos = Position;GP = Games played; Min, TOI = Minutes played; W = Wins; L = Losses; T,T/OT = Ties; OTL = Overtime losses; GA = Goals-against; GAA = Goals-against average; SO = Shutouts; SA = Shots against; SV = Shots saved;SV% = Save percentage;

== Awards and records ==
- Wilf Cude – NHL Second All-Star team
- Babe Siebert – NHL First All-Star team, Hart Memorial Trophy
- O'Brien Cup – First place in Canadian division.

== Transactions ==
- September 1, 1936 – Howie Morenz traded to Montreal by NY Rangers for cash.
- September 10, 1936 – Traded Leroy Goldsworthy, Sammy McManus and $10,000 to Boston for Babe Siebert and Roger Jenkins.
- November 24, 1936 – George Hainsworth signed as a free agent.

== See also ==
- 1936–37 NHL season
