= 1936–37 Montreal Maroons season =

National Hockey League team season

1936–37 Montreal Maroons
- Division: 2nd Canadian
- 1936–37 record: 22–17–9
- Home record: 12–7–5
- Road record: 10–10–4
- Goals for: 126
- Goals against: 110

Team information
- Coach: Tommy Gorman
- Captain: Lionel Conacher
- Arena: Montreal Forum

Team leaders
- Goals: Earl Robinson (16)
- Assists: Bob Gracie (25)
- Points: Bob Gracie (36)
- Penalty minutes: Lionel Conacher (64)
- Wins: Bill Beveridge (12)
- Goals against average: Bill Beveridge (2.19)

The 1936–37 Montreal Maroons season was the 13th season of the NHL team. The team qualified for the playoffs and defeated the Boston Bruins in the first round, before losing to the New York Rangers in the second round.

== Offseason ==
The Maroons and the Boston Bruins played a pre-season series of six games in eastern Canada. Each team won three games.

- Tuesday, October 27 Bruins 2 Maroons 1 @ Saint John
- Wednesday, October 28 Maroons 3 Bruins 1 @ Saint John
- Thursday, October 29 Bruins 1 Maroons 0 @ Moncton
- Saturday, October 31 Maroons 4 Bruins 0 @ Halifax
- Monday, November 2 Bruins 3 Maroons 2 @ Halifax
- Wednesday, November 4 Maroons 3 Bruins 1 @ Moncton

== Regular season ==
=== Final standings ===
Canadian Division
	GP	W	L	T	GF	GA	PTS
**Montreal Canadiens**	48	24	18	6	115	111	54
**Montreal Maroons**	48	22	17	9	126	110	53
**Toronto Maple Leafs**	48	22	21	5	119	115	49
New York Americans	48	15	29	4	122	161	34

Note: W = Wins, L = Losses, T = Ties, GF = Goals For, GA = Goals Against, Pts = Points
Teams that qualified for the playoffs are highlighted in bold.

=== Record vs. opponents ===
==== Vs. Canadian Division ====
1936–37 NHL records
Team	**MTL**	**MTM**	**NYA**	**TOR**	**Total**
M. Canadiens	—	2–3–3	6–2	2–6	**10–11–3**
M. Maroons	3–2–3	—	5–3	4–3–1	**12–8–4**
N.Y. Americans	2–6	3–5	—	3–5	**8–16–0**
Toronto	6–2	3–4–1	5–3	—	**14–9–1**

==== Vs. American Division ====
1936–37 NHL records
Team	**BOS**	**CHI**	**DET**	**NYR**	**Total**
M. Canadiens	3–2–1	4–2	4–1–1	3–2–1	**14–7–3**
M. Maroons	1–5	6–0	1–2–3	2–2–2	**10–9–5**
N.Y. Americans	1–4–1	1–3–2	3–2–1	2–4	**7–13–4**
Toronto	2–3–1	3–1–2	2–3–1	1–5	**8–12–4**

== Playoffs ==
The Maroons faced off against Boston in the first round in a best-of-three series and won it in three games, or 2–1. They went against the Rangers in a best-of-three series and were swept in two games, or 0–2.

== Schedule and results ==
1936–37 regular season
November

Game	Result	Date	Score	Opponent	Record
1	L	November 10, 1936	1–4	New York Rangers (1936–37)	0–1–0
2	L	November 12, 1936	1–2	@ Montreal Canadiens (1936–37)	0–2–0
3	T	November 14, 1936	2–2 OT	Detroit Red Wings (1936–37)	0–2–1
4	T	November 15, 1936	2–2 OT	@ Detroit Red Wings (1936–37)	0–2–2
5	W	November 19, 1936	4–0	@ Chicago Black Hawks (1936–37)	1–2–2
6	L	November 22, 1936	2–3	@ New York Americans (1936–37)	1–3–2
7	T	November 24, 1936	2–2 OT	Montreal Canadiens (1936–37)	1–3–3
8	L	November 26, 1936	2–3 OT	@ Boston Bruins (1936–37)	1–4–3
9	W	November 28, 1936	3–2	New York Americans (1936–37)	2–4–3

December

Game	Result	Date	Score	Opponent	Record
10	L	December 1, 1936	1–2	Toronto Maple Leafs (1936–37)	2–5–3
11	W	December 5, 1936	3–1	@ Toronto Maple Leafs (1936–37)	3–5–3
12	W	December 10, 1936	2–1	Chicago Black Hawks (1936–37)	4–5–3
13	T	December 12, 1936	2–2 OT	Montreal Canadiens (1936–37)	4–5–4
14	T	December 15, 1936	2–2 OT	@ New York Rangers (1936–37)	4–5–5
15	L	December 17, 1936	0–5	Boston Bruins (1936–37)	4–6–5
16	L	December 22, 1936	1–3	@ New York Americans (1936–37)	4–7–5
17	W	December 26, 1936	4–3 OT	New York Americans (1936–37)	5–7–5
18	L	December 29, 1936	0–3	@ Boston Bruins (1936–37)	5–8–5
19	W	December 31, 1936	3–1 OT	Toronto Maple Leafs (1936–37)	6–8–5

January

Game	Result	Date	Score	Opponent	Record
20	T	January 2, 1937	0–0 OT	@ Toronto Maple Leafs (1936–37)	6–8–6
21	W	January 3, 1937	3–1	@ Chicago Black Hawks (1936–37)	7–8–6
22	W	January 5, 1937	4–2	Montreal Canadiens (1936–37)	8–8–6
23	L	January 9, 1937	2–3	New York Rangers (1936–37)	8–9–6
24	W	January 10, 1937	5–2	@ New York Rangers (1936–37)	9–9–6
25	L	January 12, 1937	0–4	@ New York Americans (1936–37)	9–10–6
26	W	January 14, 1937	7–3	Chicago Black Hawks (1936–37)	10–10–6
27	L	January 16, 1937	0–5	@ Montreal Canadiens (1936–37)	10–11–6
28	L	January 21, 1937	1–2	Boston Bruins (1936–37)	10–12–6
29	T	January 23, 1937	1–1 OT	Detroit Red Wings (1936–37)	10–12–7
30	L	January 24, 1937	1–2	@ Detroit Red Wings (1936–37)	10–13–7
31	L	January 30, 1937	4–7	@ Toronto Maple Leafs (1936–37)	10–14–7
32	W	January 31, 1937	2–1	@ Chicago Black Hawks (1936–37)	11–14–7

February

Game	Result	Date	Score	Opponent	Record
33	W	February 2, 1937	3–1	Toronto Maple Leafs (1936–37)	12–14–7
34	T	February 6, 1937	1–1 OT	New York Rangers (1936–37)	12–14–8
35	W	February 7, 1937	4–2	@ New York Rangers (1936–37)	13–14–8
36	W	February 9, 1937	2–0	@ Boston Bruins (1936–37)	14–14–8
37	W	February 13, 1937	5–1	@ Montreal Canadiens (1936–37)	15–14–8
38	L	February 18, 1937	1–2	Boston Bruins (1936–37)	15–15–8
39	W	February 20, 1937	6–1	Chicago Black Hawks (1936–37)	16–15–8
40	L	February 27, 1937	2–3	@ Toronto Maple Leafs (1936–37)	16–16–8

March

Game	Result	Date	Score	Opponent	Record
41	L	March 2, 1937	4–7	Detroit Red Wings (1936–37)	16–17–8
42	W	March 6, 1937	4–3	New York Americans (1936–37)	17–17–8
43	W	March 9, 1937	4–1	@ Montreal Canadiens (1936–37)	18–17–8
44	W	March 11, 1937	3–2	Toronto Maple Leafs (1936–37)	19–17–8
45	W	March 14, 1937	6–4	@ New York Americans (1936–37)	20–17–8
46	T	March 16, 1937	1–1 OT	Montreal Canadiens (1936–37)	20–17–9
47	W	March 20, 1937	8–4	New York Americans (1936–37)	21–17–9
48	W	March 21, 1937	5–1	@ Detroit Red Wings (1936–37)	22–17–9

Legend: Win (2 points) Loss (0 points) Tie (1 point)

== Player statistics ==
=== Regular season ===
Scoring

Player	Pos	GP	G	A	Pts	PIM
Bob Gracie	C/LW	47	11	25	36	18
Earl Robinson	RW/C	47	16	18	34	19
Herb Cain	LW	42	13	17	30	18
Baldy Northcott	D/LW	46	15	14	29	18
Jimmy Ward	RW	40	14	14	28	34
Lionel Conacher	D	47	6	19	25	64
Dave Trottier	LW	43	12	11	23	33
Gus Marker	RW	47	10	12	22	22
Russ Blinco	C	48	6	12	18	2
Gerry Shannon	LW	31	9	7	16	13
Paul Runge	C/LW	30	4	10	14	6
Stewart Evans	D	47	6	7	13	54
Cy Wentworth	D	43	3	4	7	29
Gerry Carson	D	42	1	3	4	28
Carl Voss	C	20	0	2	2	4
Bill MacKenzie	D	10	0	1	1	6
Yip Radley	D	17	0	1	1	13
Bill Beveridge	G	21	0	0	0	0
Alec Connell	G	27	0	0	0	0
Roger Jenkins	RW/D	1	0	0	0	0
Max Kaminsky	C	6	0	0	0	0

Goaltending

Player	MIN	GP	W	L	T	GA	GAA	SO
Bill Beveridge	1290	21	12	6	3	47	2.19	1
Alec Connell	1710	27	10	11	6	63	2.21	2
Team:	3000	48	22	17	9	110	2.20	3

=== Playoffs ===
Scoring

Player	Pos	GP	G	A	Pts	PIM
Bob Gracie	C/LW	5	1	2	3	2
Earl Robinson	RW/C	5	1	2	3	0
Herb Cain	LW	5	1	1	2	0
Baldy Northcott	D/LW	5	1	1	2	2
Russ Blinco	C	5	1	0	1	2
Dave Trottier	LW	5	1	0	1	5
Carl Voss	C	5	1	0	1	0
Cy Wentworth	D	5	1	0	1	0
Lionel Conacher	D	5	0	1	1	2
Gus Marker	RW	5	0	1	1	0
Gerry Shannon	LW	5	0	1	1	0
Bill Beveridge	G	5	0	0	0	0
Gerry Carson	D	5	0	0	0	4
Stewart Evans	D	5	0	0	0	0
Paul Runge	C/LW	5	0	0	0	4

Goaltending

Player	MIN	GP	W	L	GA	GAA	SO
Bill Beveridge	300	5	2	3	11	2.20	0
Team:	300	5	2	3	11	2.20	0

Note: GP = Games played; G = Goals; A = Assists; Pts = Points; +/- = Plus/minus; PIM = Penalty minutes; PPG = Power-play goals; SHG = Short-handed goals; GWG = Game-winning goals
MIN = Minutes played; W = Wins; L = Losses; T = Ties; GA = Goals against; GAA = Goals against average; SO = Shutouts;

== Awards and records ==
Detroit Red Wings 1:0 Montreal Maroons 6 OT

== See also ==
- 1936–37 NHL season
