= 1937 Stanley Cup Final =

1937 ice hockey championship series

	1	2	3	4	5	Total
Detroit Red Wings	1	4	0	1	3	3
New York Rangers	5	2	1	0	0	2
- Location(s): New York City: Madison Square Garden (1); Detroit: Olympia Stadium (2–5)
- Format: best-of-five
- Coaches: Detroit: Jack Adams; New York: Lester Patrick
- Captains: Detroit: Doug Young; New York: Bill Cook
- Dates: April 6–15, 1937
- Series-winning goal: Marty Barry (19:22, first)
- Hall of Famers: Red Wings: Marty Barry (1965); Ebbie Goodfellow (1963); Syd Howe (1965); Herbie Lewis (1989); Rangers: Frank Boucher (1958); Neil Colville (1967); Art Coulter (1974); Ching Johnson (1937); Lynn Patrick (1980); Babe Pratt (1966); Coaches: Jack Adams (1959, player); Lester Patrick (1947, player)

The 1937 Stanley Cup Final was contested by the defending champion Detroit Red Wings and the New York Rangers in their fifth Finals series appearance. Detroit would win the series 3–2 to win their second and second-straight Stanley Cup.

== Paths to the Finals ==
Detroit defeated Montreal Canadiens in a best-of-five 3–2 to advance to the Finals. The Rangers had to play two best-of three series; winning 2–0 against Toronto Maple Leafs, and 2–0 against the Montreal Maroons to advance to the Finals.

== Game summaries ==
The Wings became the first U.S.-based team to win the Stanley Cup two years in a row, and the third NHL team (after the 1920-21 Ottawa Senators and 1930-31 Montreal Canadiens) to repeat since the league's founding in 1917.

April 6	Detroit Red Wings	1–5	New York Rangers	Madison Square Garden III	Recap
No scoring		First period	5:23 - Butch Keeling (2); 9:40 - Lynn Patrick (2); 18:43 - Joe Cooper (1)
No scoring		Second period	18:55 - Frank Boucher (2)
Syd Howe (2) - 17:12		Third period	18:22 - Lynn Patrick (3)
Normie Smith; Earl Robertson		Goalie stats	Dave Kerr

April 8	New York Rangers	2–4	Detroit Red Wings	Olympia Stadium	Recap
No scoring		First period	9:22 - pp - John Sorrell (1); 12:07 - Mud Bruneteau (2); 13:31 - John Gallagher (1)
Babe Pratt (3) - 15:06; Butch Keeling (3) - 18:18		Second period	11:02 - Herbie Lewis (4)
No scoring		Third period	No scoring
Dave Kerr		Goalie stats	Earl Robertson

April 11	New York Rangers	1–0	Detroit Red Wings	Olympia Stadium	Recap
No scoring		First period	No scoring
Neil Colville (3) - 00:23		Second period	No scoring
No scoring		Third period	No scoring
Dave Kerr		Goalie stats	Earl Robertson

April 13	New York Rangers	0–1	Detroit Red Wings	Olympia Stadium	Recap
No scoring		First period	No scoring
No scoring		Second period	No scoring
No scoring		Third period	12:43 - Marty Barry (2)
Dave Kerr		Goalie stats	Earl Robertson

April 15	New York Rangers	0–3	Detroit Red Wings	Olympia Stadium	Recap
No scoring		First period	19:22 - pp - Marty Barry (3)
No scoring		Second period	9:36 - John Sorrell (2)
No scoring		Third period	2:22 - Marty Barry (4)
Dave Kerr		Goalie stats	Earl Robertson

Detroit won series 3–2

== Stanley Cup engraving ==
The 1937 Stanley Cup was presented to Red Wings captain Doug Young by NHL President Frank Calder following the Red Wings 3–0 win over the Rangers in game five.

The following Red Wings players and staff had their names engraved on the Stanley Cup

1936–37 Detroit Red Wings

=== Players ===
Centres

- 7 Marty Barry
- 9 Wally Kilrea
- 11 Gord Pettinger

Wingers

- 4 Herbie Lewis
- 6 Larry Aurie
- 8 Syd Howe
- 10 John Sorrell
- 12 Hec Kilrea
- 14 Modere Mud Bruneteau
- 17-14 Howard Mackie*
- 15 Pete Kelly*
- 18 John Sherf

Defencemen

- 2-14 Doug Young (Captain)
- 17-2 John Gallegher
- 3 Wilfred Bucko McDonald
- 5 Ebbie Goodfellow
- 16 Ralph "Scotty" Bowman
- 18-16-2 Orville "Rolly" Roulston
- 17-2 Jimmy Orlando

Goaltenders

- 1 Normie Smith
- 1 Earl Robertson(Sub)
- 30 Jimmy Franks (Sub)

=== Coaching and administrative staff ===
- James E. Norris Sr. (President/Owner), James D. Norris Jr. (Vice President/Owner)
- Arthur Wirtz Sr. (Secretary-Treasurer/Owner), Frank "Honey" Walker (Trainer),
- Jack Adams (Manager-Coach)

=== Stanley Cup engraving ===
- Initially, the engraving for 1936 and 1937 included each member's position and playoff scores. Hec Kilrea's position was listed as 'General Utility' instead of 'Left Wing'. No other time has a player's position ever been included on the Stanley Cup. When the Cup was redone during the 1957–58 season, all player positions and playoff scores for both years were left off the cup.
- * Two players, Pete Kelly and Howard Mackie, were included on the original ring in 1937. Their names are not on the newer ring, now retired to the Hockey Hall of Fame.
- Carl Mattson (Ass't Trainer) was not included on the Cup in 1936 or 1937. There is more than enough room for all three members to have been engraved on the ring.
- Ebbie Goodfellow served as Captain, because Doug Young missed most of the season with an injury.
- Jimmy Orlando played 9 regular-season games for Detroit. He also played 37 regular-season games and 5 playoff games in the minors for Pittsburgh. Detroit still included his name on the Stanley Cup even though he did not qualify.

== See also ==
- 1936–37 NHL season

== References & notes ==
- Diamond, Dan (2000). Total Stanley Cup. Toronto: Total Sports Canada. ISBN 978-1-892129-07-9.
- Podnieks, Andrew; Hockey Hall of Fame (2004). Lord Stanley's Cup. Bolton, Ont.: Fenn Pub. pp 12, 50. ISBN 978-1-55168-261-7
- "All-Time NHL Results". Archived from the original on July 24, 2017.

Preceded by Detroit Red Wings; 1936	Detroit Red Wings; Stanley Cup champions 1937	Succeeded by Chicago Black Hawks; 1938
