= 1936–37 New York Americans season =

National Hockey League team season

1936–37 New York Americans
- Division: 4th Canadian
- 1936–37 record: 15–29–4
- Home record: 9–13–2
- Road record: 6–16–2
- Goals for: 122
- Goals against: 161

Team information
- Coach: Red Dutton
- Captain: Sweeney Schriner
- Arena: Madison Square Garden

Team leaders
- Goals: Sweeney Schriner (21)
- Assists: Sweeney Schriner (25)
- Points: Sweeney Schriner (46)
- Penalty minutes: Allan Shields (79)
- Wins: Alfie Moore (7)
- Goals against average: Roy Worters (2.90)

The 1936–37 New York Americans season was the Americans' 12th season of play. After qualifying for the playoffs in 1936, the Americans again placed last in the Canadian Division to miss qualifying for the playoffs. The Americans had now failed to qualify in ten of the franchise's twelve seasons in New York.

== Regular season ==
=== Final standings ===
Canadian Division
| | GP | W | L | T | GF | GA | PTS |
|---|---|---|---|---|---|---|---|
| **Montreal Canadiens** | 48 | 24 | 18 | 6 | 115 | 111 | 54 |
| **Montreal Maroons** | 48 | 22 | 17 | 9 | 126 | 110 | 53 |
| **Toronto Maple Leafs** | 48 | 22 | 21 | 5 | 119 | 115 | 49 |
| New York Americans | 48 | 15 | 29 | 4 | 122 | 161 | 34 |

Note: W = Wins, L = Losses, T = Ties, GF = Goals For, GA = Goals Against, Pts = Points
Teams that qualified for the playoffs are highlighted in bold.

=== Record vs. opponents ===
==== Vs. Canadian Division ====
1936–37 NHL records
| Team | **MTL** | **MTM** | **NYA** | **TOR** | **Total** |
|---|---|---|---|---|---|
| M. Canadiens | — | 2–3–3 | 6–2 | 2–6 | **10–11–3** |
| M. Maroons | 3–2–3 | — | 5–3 | 4–3–1 | **12–8–4** |
| N.Y. Americans | 2–6 | 3–5 | — | 3–5 | **8–16–0** |
| Toronto | 6–2 | 3–4–1 | 5–3 | — | **14–9–1** |

==== Vs. American Division ====
1936–37 NHL records
| Team | **BOS** | **CHI** | **DET** | **NYR** | **Total** |
|---|---|---|---|---|---|
| M. Canadiens | 3–2–1 | 4–2 | 4–1–1 | 3–2–1 | **14–7–3** |
| M. Maroons | 1–5 | 6–0 | 1–2–3 | 2–2–2 | **10–9–5** |
| N.Y. Americans | 1–4–1 | 1–3–2 | 3–2–1 | 2–4 | **7–13–4** |
| Toronto | 2–3–1 | 3–1–2 | 2–3–1 | 1–5 | **8–12–4** |

== Schedule and results ==
1936–37 regular season
November

| Game | Result | Date | Score | Opponent | Record |
|---|---|---|---|---|---|
| 1 | T | November 5, 1936 | 1–1 OT | @ Chicago Black Hawks (1936–37) | 0–0–1 |
| 2 | W | November 7, 1936 | 3–2 | @ Toronto Maple Leafs (1936–37) | 1–0–1 |
| 3 | T | November 12, 1936 | 0–0 OT | Chicago Black Hawks (1936–37) | 1–0–2 |
| 4 | W | November 15, 1936 | 2–1 | @ New York Rangers (1936–37) | 2–0–2 |
| 5 | W | November 17, 1936 | 5–2 | Montreal Canadiens (1936–37) | 3–0–2 |
| 6 | L | November 19, 1936 | 2–3 | @ Montreal Canadiens (1936–37) | 3–1–2 |
| 7 | W | November 22, 1936 | 3–2 | Montreal Maroons (1936–37) | 4–1–2 |
| 8 | L | November 26, 1936 | 1–3 | New York Rangers (1936–37) | 4–2–2 |
| 9 | L | November 28, 1936 | 2–3 | @ Montreal Maroons (1936–37) | 4–3–2 |
| 10 | W | November 29, 1936 | 2–0 | @ Detroit Red Wings (1936–37) | 5–3–2 |

December

| Game | Result | Date | Score | Opponent | Record |
|---|---|---|---|---|---|
| 11 | T | December 6, 1936 | 3–3 OT | Detroit Red Wings (1936–37) | 5–3–3 |
| 12 | L | December 13, 1936 | 3–4 | Boston Bruins (1936–37) | 5–4–3 |
| 13 | L | December 15, 1936 | 3–5 OT | @ Boston Bruins (1936–37) | 5–5–3 |
| 14 | L | December 17, 1936 | 1–5 | Toronto Maple Leafs (1936–37) | 5–6–3 |
| 15 | L | December 19, 1936 | 1–3 | @ Toronto Maple Leafs (1936–37) | 5–7–3 |
| 16 | L | December 20, 1936 | 1–2 | @ Chicago Black Hawks (1936–37) | 5–8–3 |
| 17 | W | December 22, 1936 | 3–1 | Montreal Maroons (1936–37) | 6–8–3 |
| 18 | L | December 26, 1936 | 3–4 OT | @ Montreal Maroons (1936–37) | 6–9–3 |
| 19 | L | December 29, 1936 | 1–5 | New York Rangers (1936–37) | 6–10–3 |
| 20 | L | December 31, 1936 | 2–4 | @ Detroit Red Wings (1936–37) | 6–11–3 |

January

| Game | Result | Date | Score | Opponent | Record |
|---|---|---|---|---|---|
| 21 | L | January 2, 1937 | 1–5 | @ Montreal Canadiens (1936–37) | 6–12–3 |
| 22 | L | January 3, 1937 | 2–4 | Montreal Canadiens (1936–37) | 6–13–3 |
| 23 | L | January 5, 1937 | 1–7 | @ New York Rangers (1936–37) | 6–14–3 |
| 24 | L | January 7, 1937 | 2–4 | Detroit Red Wings (1936–37) | 6–15–3 |
| 25 | W | January 12, 1937 | 4–0 | Montreal Maroons (1936–37) | 7–15–3 |
| 26 | L | January 17, 1937 | 0–3 | Boston Bruins (1936–37) | 7–16–3 |
| 27 | W | January 21, 1937 | 6–3 | Toronto Maple Leafs (1936–37) | 8–16–3 |
| 28 | T | January 23, 1937 | 6–6 OT | @ Boston Bruins (1936–37) | 8–16–4 |
| 29 | L | January 26, 1937 | 0–9 | Chicago Black Hawks (1936–37) | 8–17–4 |
| 30 | W | January 30, 1937 | 4–0 | @ Montreal Canadiens (1936–37) | 9–17–4 |
| 31 | L | January 31, 1937 | 2–3 OT | Montreal Canadiens (1936–37) | 9–18–4 |

February

| Game | Result | Date | Score | Opponent | Record |
|---|---|---|---|---|---|
| 32 | L | February 4, 1937 | 1–2 | Toronto Maple Leafs (1936–37) | 9–19–4 |
| 33 | L | February 6, 1937 | 0–5 | @ Toronto Maple Leafs (1936–37) | 9–20–4 |
| 34 | L | February 7, 1937 | 1–5 | @ Chicago Black Hawks (1936–37) | 9–21–4 |
| 35 | W | February 9, 1937 | 3–2 | Detroit Red Wings (1936–37) | 10–21–4 |
| 36 | W | February 14, 1937 | 5–4 | @ New York Rangers (1936–37) | 11–21–4 |
| 37 | L | February 16, 1937 | 1–2 | Montreal Canadiens (1936–37) | 11–22–4 |
| 38 | L | February 20, 1937 | 3–4 | @ Toronto Maple Leafs (1936–37) | 11–23–4 |
| 39 | W | February 21, 1937 | 3–1 | Toronto Maple Leafs (1936–37) | 12–23–4 |
| 40 | L | February 23, 1937 | 2–5 | @ Boston Bruins (1936–37) | 12–24–4 |
| 41 | W | February 25, 1937 | 3–1 | Boston Bruins (1936–37) | 13–24–4 |
| 42 | L | February 27, 1937 | 2–3 OT | @ Montreal Canadiens (1936–37) | 13–25–4 |

March

| Game | Result | Date | Score | Opponent | Record |
|---|---|---|---|---|---|
| 43 | L | March 6, 1937 | 3–4 | @ Montreal Maroons (1936–37) | 13–26–4 |
| 44 | W | March 7, 1937 | 3–1 | @ Detroit Red Wings (1936–37) | 14–26–4 |
| 45 | L | March 9, 1937 | 5–7 OT | New York Rangers (1936–37) | 14–27–4 |
| 46 | L | March 14, 1937 | 4–6 | Montreal Maroons (1936–37) | 14–28–4 |
| 47 | W | March 18, 1937 | 9–4 | Chicago Black Hawks (1936–37) | 15–28–4 |
| 48 | L | March 20, 1937 | 4–8 | @ Montreal Maroons (1936–37) | 15–29–4 |

Legend: Win (2 points) Loss (0 points) Tie (1 point)

== Player statistics ==
=== Regular season ===
Scoring

| Player | GP | G | A | Pts | PIM |
|---|---|---|---|---|---|
| Sweeney Schriner | 48 | 21 | 25 | 46 | 17 |
| Lorne Carr | 48 | 18 | 16 | 34 | 22 |
| Eddie Wiseman | 44 | 14 | 19 | 33 | 12 |
| Art Chapman | 43 | 8 | 23 | 31 | 36 |
| Nels Stewart | 32 | 20 | 10 | 30 | 31 |
| Tommy Anderson | 45 | 10 | 15 | 25 | 24 |
| Joe Jerwa | 20 | 6 | 8 | 14 | 27 |
| Hap Emms | 46 | 4 | 8 | 12 | 48 |
| Joe Lamb | 48 | 3 | 9 | 12 | 53 |
| Les Cunningham | 23 | 1 | 8 | 9 | 19 |
| Tony Hemmerling | 19 | 3 | 3 | 6 | 4 |
| Roger Jenkins | 26 | 1 | 4 | 5 | 6 |
| Al Shields | 27 | 3 | 0 | 3 | 79 |
| Ted Graham | 31 | 2 | 1 | 3 | 30 |
| Lloyd Klein | 14 | 2 | 1 | 3 | 2 |
| Harry Oliver | 20 | 2 | 1 | 3 | 2 |
| Baldy Cotton | 29 | 2 | 0 | 2 | 23 |
| Lloyd Jackson | 14 | 1 | 1 | 2 | 0 |
| Allan Murray | 40 | 0 | 2 | 2 | 22 |
| Pete Leswick | 1 | 1 | 0 | 1 | 0 |
| John Doran | 21 | 0 | 1 | 1 | 10 |
| Oscar Asmundson | 1 | 0 | 0 | 0 | 0 |
| Frank Beisler | 1 | 0 | 0 | 0 | 0 |
| Lorne Chabot | 6 | 0 | 0 | 0 | 0 |
| Wilf Field | 2 | 0 | 0 | 0 | 0 |
| John Gallagher | 9 | 0 | 0 | 0 | 8 |
| Walter Kalbfleisch | 6 | 0 | 0 | 0 | 4 |
| Alfie Moore | 18 | 0 | 0 | 0 | 0 |
| Gord Reid | 1 | 0 | 0 | 0 | 2 |
| Alex Wood | 1 | 0 | 0 | 0 | 0 |
| Roy Worters | 23 | 0 | 0 | 0 | 0 |

Goaltending

| Player | MIN | GP | W | L | T | GA | GAA | SA | SV | SV% | SO |
|---|---|---|---|---|---|---|---|---|---|---|---|
| Alfie Moore | 1110 | 18 | 7 | 11 | 0 | 64 | 3.46 | | | | 1 |
| Roy Worters | 1430 | 23 | 6 | 14 | 3 | 69 | 2.90 | | | | 2 |
| Lorne Chabot | 370 | 6 | 2 | 3 | 1 | 25 | 4.05 | | | | 1 |
| Alex Wood | 70 | 1 | 0 | 1 | 0 | 3 | 2.57 | | | | 0 |
| Team: | 2980 | 48 | 15 | 29 | 4 | 161 | 3.24 | | | | 4 |

== See also ==
- 1936–37 NHL season
