= 1936–37 Toronto Maple Leafs season =

NHL hockey team season

1936–37 Toronto Maple Leafs
- Division: 3rd Canadian
- 1936–37 record: 22–21–5
- Home record: 14–9–1
- Road record: 8–12–4
- Goals for: 119
- Goals against: 115

Team information
- General manager: Conn Smythe
- Coach: Dick Irvin
- Captain: Hap Day
- Arena: Maple Leaf Gardens

Team leaders
- Goals: Busher Jackson (45)
- Assists: Syl Apps (29)
- Points: Syl Apps (45)
- Penalty minutes: Red Horner (124)
- Wins: Turk Broda (22)
- Goals against average: Turk Broda (2.30)

The 1936–37 Toronto Maple Leafs season was the 20th season of play for the Toronto NHL franchise, tenth as the Maple Leafs.

== Regular season ==
=== Final standings ===
Canadian Division
	GP	W	L	T	GF	GA	PTS
**Montreal Canadiens**	48	24	18	6	115	111	54
**Montreal Maroons**	48	22	17	9	126	110	53
**Toronto Maple Leafs**	48	22	21	5	119	115	49
New York Americans	48	15	29	4	122	161	34

Note: W = Wins, L = Losses, T = Ties, GF = Goals For, GA = Goals Against, Pts = Points
Teams that qualified for the playoffs are highlighted in bold.

=== Record vs. opponents ===
==== Vs. Canadian Division ====
1936–37 NHL records
Team	**MTL**	**MTM**	**NYA**	**TOR**	**Total**
M. Canadiens	—	2–3–3	6–2	2–6	**10–11–3**
M. Maroons	3–2–3	—	5–3	4–3–1	**12–8–4**
N.Y. Americans	2–6	3–5	—	3–5	**8–16–0**
Toronto	6–2	3–4–1	5–3	—	**14–9–1**

==== Vs. American Division ====
1936–37 NHL records
Team	**BOS**	**CHI**	**DET**	**NYR**	**Total**
M. Canadiens	3–2–1	4–2	4–1–1	3–2–1	**14–7–3**
M. Maroons	1–5	6–0	1–2–3	2–2–2	**10–9–5**
N.Y. Americans	1–4–1	1–3–2	3–2–1	2–4	**7–13–4**
Toronto	2–3–1	3–1–2	2–3–1	1–5	**8–12–4**

== Schedule and results ==
1936–37 regular season
November

Game	Result	Date	Score	Opponent	Record
1	L	November 5, 1936	1–3	Detroit Red Wings (1936–37)	0–1–0
2	L	November 7, 1936	2–3	New York Americans (1936–37)	0–2–0
3	W	November 14, 1936	6–2	Chicago Black Hawks (1936–37)	1–2–0
4	T	November 15, 1936	1–1 OT	@ Chicago Black Hawks (1936–37)	1–2–1
5	L	November 21, 1936	3–4	Boston Bruins (1936–37)	1–3–1
6	L	November 22, 1936	2–4	@ Detroit Red Wings (1936–37)	1–4–1
7	L	November 24, 1936	1–5	@ New York Rangers (1936–37)	1–5–1
8	W	November 26, 1936	4–2	@ Montreal Canadiens (1936–37)	2–5–1
9	W	November 28, 1936	4–2	Montreal Canadiens (1936–37)	3–5–1

December

Game	Result	Date	Score	Opponent	Record
10	W	December 1, 1936	2–1	@ Montreal Maroons (1936–37)	4–5–1
11	L	December 5, 1936	1–3	Montreal Maroons (1936–37)	4–6–1
12	L	December 12, 1936	3–5 OT	New York Rangers (1936–37)	4–7–1
13	W	December 17, 1936	5–1	@ New York Americans (1936–37)	5–7–1
14	W	December 19, 1936	3–1	New York Americans (1936–37)	6–7–1
15	W	December 22, 1936	4–2	@ Boston Bruins (1936–37)	7–7–1
16	L	December 26, 1936	1–2	Boston Bruins (1936–37)	7–8–1
17	L	December 31, 1936	1–3 OT	@ Montreal Maroons (1936–37)	7–9–1

January

Game	Result	Date	Score	Opponent	Record
18	T	January 2, 1937	0–0 OT	Montreal Maroons (1936–37)	7–9–2
19	L	January 3, 1937	2–4	@ Detroit Red Wings (1936–37)	7–10–2
20	L	January 7, 1937	1–4	@ Montreal Canadiens (1936–37)	7–11–2
21	W	January 9, 1937	2–1	Montreal Canadiens (1936–37)	8–11–2
22	L	January 10, 1937	1–2	@ Chicago Black Hawks (1936–37)	8–12–2
23	W	January 16, 1937	3–2 OT	Chicago Black Hawks (1936–37)	9–12–2
24	W	January 19, 1937	6–2	@ Boston Bruins (1936–37)	10–12–2
25	L	January 21, 1937	3–6	@ New York Americans (1936–37)	10–13–2
26	W	January 23, 1937	4–0	New York Rangers (1936–37)	11–13–2
27	L	January 24, 1937	2–4	@ New York Rangers (1936–37)	11–14–2
28	L	January 26, 1937	1–3	Montreal Canadiens (1936–37)	11–15–2
29	W	January 30, 1937	7–4	Montreal Maroons (1936–37)	12–15–2

February

Game	Result	Date	Score	Opponent	Record
30	L	February 2, 1937	1–3	@ Montreal Maroons (1936–37)	12–16–2
31	W	February 4, 1937	2–1	@ New York Americans (1936–37)	13–16–2
32	W	February 6, 1937	5–0	New York Americans (1936–37)	14–16–2
33	L	February 9, 1937	1–5	New York Rangers (1936–37)	14–17–2
34	L	February 13, 1937	0–3	Boston Bruins (1936–37)	14–18–2
35	T	February 14, 1937	3–3 OT	@ Detroit Red Wings (1936–37)	14–18–3
36	W	February 18, 1937	3–1	Detroit Red Wings (1936–37)	15–18–3
37	W	February 20, 1937	4–3	New York Americans (1936–37)	16–18–3
38	L	February 21, 1937	1–3	@ New York Americans (1936–37)	16–19–3
39	L	February 23, 1937	1–2	@ New York Rangers (1936–37)	16–20–3
40	W	February 25, 1937	3–1	@ Montreal Canadiens (1936–37)	17–20–3
41	W	February 27, 1937	3–2	Montreal Maroons (1936–37)	18–20–3

March

Game	Result	Date	Score	Opponent	Record
42	W	March 6, 1937	3–1 OT	Montreal Canadiens (1936–37)	19–20–3
43	T	March 7, 1937	2–2 OT	@ Chicago Black Hawks (1936–37)	19–20–4
44	L	March 11, 1937	2–3	@ Montreal Maroons (1936–37)	19–21–4
45	W	March 13, 1937	3–2	Chicago Black Hawks (1936–37)	20–21–4
46	T	March 16, 1937	1–1 OT	@ Boston Bruins (1936–37)	20–21–5
47	W	March 18, 1937	2–1	@ Montreal Canadiens (1936–37)	21–21–5
48	W	March 20, 1937	3–2	Detroit Red Wings (1936–37)	22–21–5

Legend: Win (2 points) Loss (0 points) Tie (1 point)

== Playoffs ==
The Maple Leafs played the New York Rangers in the first round in a best of three series and got swept in 2 games.

== Player statistics ==
=== Regular season ===
Scoring

Player	Pos	GP	G	A	Pts	PIM
Syl Apps	C	48	16	29	45	10
Busher Jackson	LW	46	21	19	40	12
Gordie Drillon	RW	41	16	17	33	2
Nick Metz	LW	48	9	11	20	19
Bill Thoms	C	48	10	9	19	14
Jimmy Fowler	D	48	7	11	18	22
Bob Davidson	LW	46	8	7	15	43
Red Horner	D	48	3	9	12	124
Reg Hamilton	D	39	3	7	10	32
Buzz Boll	LW	25	6	3	9	12
Frank Finnigan	RW	48	2	7	9	4
Jack Shill	C	32	4	4	8	26
Charlie Conacher	RW	15	3	5	8	13
Hap Day	D	48	3	4	7	20
Bill Kendall	RW	15	2	4	6	4
Art Jackson	C	14	2	0	2	2
Pep Kelly	RW	16	2	0	2	8
King Clancy	D	6	1	0	1	4
James "Bud" Jarvis	LW	24	1	0	1	0
Turk Broda	G	45	0	0	0	0
George Hainsworth	G	3	0	0	0	0
Jack Howard	D	2	0	0	0	0
George Parsons	LW	5	0	0	0	0

Goaltending

Player	MIN	GP	W	L	T	GA	GAA	SO
Turk Broda	2770	45	22	19	4	106	2.30	3
George Hainsworth	190	3	0	2	1	9	2.84	0
Team:	2960	48	22	21	5	115	2.33	3

=== Playoffs ===
Scoring

Player	Pos	GP	G	A	Pts	PIM
Busher Jackson	LW	2	1	0	1	2
Syl Apps	C	2	0	1	1	0
Reg Hamilton	D	2	0	1	1	2
Buzz Boll	LW	2	0	0	0	0
Turk Broda	G	2	0	0	0	0
Charlie Conacher	RW	2	0	0	0	5
Bob Davidson	LW	2	0	0	0	5
Hap Day	D	2	0	0	0	0
Gordie Drillon	RW	2	0	0	0	0
Frank Finnigan	RW	2	0	0	0	0
Jimmy Fowler	D	2	0	0	0	0
Red Horner	D	2	0	0	0	7
Nick Metz	LW	2	0	0	0	0
Jack Shill	C	2	0	0	0	0
Bill Thoms	C	2	0	0	0	0

Goaltending

Player	MIN	GP	W	L	GA	GAA	SO
Turk Broda	133	2	0	2	5	2.26	0
Team:	133	2	0	2	5	2.26	0

Note:

Pos = Position;GP = Games played; G = Goals; A = Assists; Pts = Points; PIM = Penalty minutes; +/- = Plus/minus; PPG = Power-play goals; SHG = Short-handed goals; GWG = Game-winning goals
Pos = Position;GP = Games played; Min, TOI = Minutes played; W = Wins; L = Losses; T,T/OT = Ties; OTL = Overtime losses; GA = Goals-against; GAA = Goals-against average; SO = Shutouts; SA = Shots against; SV = Shots saved;SV% = Save percentage;

== Transactions ==
- May 6, 1936: Acquired Turk Broda from the Detroit Red Wings for $8,000
- May 7, 1936: Traded Andy Blair to the Chicago Black Hawks for cash
- May 7, 1936: Claimed Murray Armstrong from the New York Rangers in Inter-league Draft
- November 24, 1936: King Clancy retires
- December 29, 1936: Acquired loan of Bill Kendall from the Chicago Black Hawks for loan of Pep Kelly for remainder of the 1936–37 season

== See also ==
- 1936–37 NHL season
