= 1936–37 Boston Bruins season =

Professional ice hockey team season

1936–37 Boston Bruins
- Division: 2nd American
- 1936–37 record: 23–18–7
- Home record: 9–11–4
- Road record: 14–7–3
- Goals for: 120
- Goals against: 110

Team information
- General manager: Art Ross
- Coach: Art Ross
- Captain: Red Beattie
- Arena: Boston Garden

Team leaders
- Goals: Dit Clapper (17)
- Assists: Bill Cowley (22)
- Points: Bill Cowley (35)
- Penalty minutes: Jack Portland (58)
- Wins: Tiny Thompson (23)
- Goals against average: Tiny Thompson (2.22)

The 1936–37 Boston Bruins season was the Bruins' 13th season in the National Hockey League (NHL). The team finished second in the American Division and lost in the quarterfinals of the playoffs to the Montreal Maroons.

== Regular season ==
=== Final standings ===
American Division
	GP	W	L	T	GF	GA	PTS
**Detroit Red Wings**	48	25	14	9	128	102	59
**Boston Bruins**	48	23	18	7	120	110	53
**New York Rangers**	48	19	20	9	117	106	47
Chicago Black Hawks	48	14	27	7	99	131	35

Note: GP = Games Played, W = Wins, L = Losses, T = Ties, Pts = Points, GF = Goals For, GA = Goals Against
Teams that qualified for the playoffs are highlighted in bold.

=== Record vs. opponents ===
==== Vs. American Division ====
1936–37 NHL records
Team	**BOS**	**CHI**	**DET**	**NYR**	**Total**
Boston	—	5–2–1	1–7	3–2–3	**9–11–4**
Chicago	2–5–1	—	2–5–1	4–3–1	**8–13–3**
Detroit	7–1	5–2–1	—	5–1–2	**17–4–3**
N.Y. Rangers	2–3–3	3–4–1	1–5–2	—	**6–12–6**

==== Vs. Canadian Division ====
1936–37 NHL records
Team	**MTL**	**MTM**	**NYA**	**TOR**	**Total**
Boston	2–3–1	5–1	4–1–1	3–2–1	**14–7–3**
Chicago	2–4	0–6	3–1–2	1–3–2	**6–14–4**
Detroit	1–4–1	2–1–3	2–3–1	3–2–1	**8–10–6**
N.Y. Rangers	2–3–1	2–2–2	4–2	5–1	**13–8–3**

== Schedule and results ==
1936–37 regular season
November

Game	Result	Date	Score	Opponent	Record
1	L	November 7, 1936	0–2	@ Montreal Canadiens (1936–37)	0–1–0
2	W	November 15, 1936	2–1	Montreal Canadiens (1936–37)	1–1–0
3	L	November 17, 1936	1–6	New York Rangers (1936–37)	1–2–0
4	W	November 21, 1936	4–3	@ Toronto Maple Leafs (1936–37)	2–2–0
5	W	November 22, 1936	2–1	@ Chicago Black Hawks (1936–37)	3–2–0
6	T	November 24, 1936	1–1 OT	Chicago Black Hawks (1936–37)	3–2–1
7	W	November 26, 1936	3–2 OT	Montreal Maroons (1936–37)	4–2–1
8	T	November 28, 1936	2–2 OT	@ New York Rangers (1936–37)	4–2–2

December

Game	Result	Date	Score	Opponent	Record
9	L	December 5, 1936	3–4	@ Montreal Canadiens (1936–37)	4–3–2
10	L	December 8, 1936	3–4	Detroit Red Wings (1936–37)	4–4–2
11	W	December 13, 1936	4–3	@ New York Americans (1936–37)	5–4–2
12	W	December 15, 1936	5–3 OT	New York Americans (1936–37)	6–4–2
13	W	December 17, 1936	5–0	@ Montreal Maroons (1936–37)	7–4–2
14	L	December 20, 1936	3–4	@ Detroit Red Wings (1936–37)	7–5–2
15	L	December 22, 1936	2–4	Toronto Maple Leafs (1936–37)	7–6–2
16	W	December 26, 1936	2–1	@ Toronto Maple Leafs (1936–37)	8–6–2
17	W	December 29, 1936	3–0	Montreal Maroons (1936–37)	9–6–2
18	T	December 31, 1936	2–2 OT	@ New York Rangers (1936–37)	9–6–3

January

Game	Result	Date	Score	Opponent	Record
19	W	January 3, 1937	3–2	New York Rangers (1936–37)	10–6–3
20	L	January 5, 1937	2–3	Detroit Red Wings (1936–37)	10–7–3
21	W	January 7, 1937	2–0	@ Chicago Black Hawks (1936–37)	11–7–3
22	L	January 10, 1937	2–4	@ Detroit Red Wings (1936–37)	11–8–3
23	L	January 12, 1937	2–4	Chicago Black Hawks (1936–37)	11–9–3
24	W	January 17, 1937	3–0	@ New York Americans (1936–37)	12–9–3
25	L	January 19, 1937	2–6	Toronto Maple Leafs (1936–37)	12–10–3
26	W	January 21, 1937	2–1	@ Montreal Maroons (1936–37)	13–10–3
27	T	January 23, 1937	6–6 OT	New York Americans (1936–37)	13–10–4
28	L	January 26, 1937	0–3	New York Rangers (1936–37)	13–11–4
29	T	January 28, 1937	1–1 OT	@ New York Rangers (1936–37)	13–11–5
30	L	January 31, 1937	1–2	Detroit Red Wings (1936–37)	13–12–5

February

Game	Result	Date	Score	Opponent	Record
31	L	February 2, 1937	0–1	Montreal Canadiens (1936–37)	13–13–5
32	W	February 4, 1937	6–2	@ Montreal Canadiens (1936–37)	14–13–5
33	L	February 7, 1937	0–8	@ Detroit Red Wings (1936–37)	14–14–5
34	L	February 9, 1937	0–2	Montreal Maroons (1936–37)	14–15–5
35	W	February 13, 1937	3–0	@ Toronto Maple Leafs (1936–37)	15–15–5
36	W	February 14, 1937	2–1	@ Chicago Black Hawks (1936–37)	16–15–5
37	W	February 16, 1937	3–2	New York Rangers (1936–37)	17–15–5
38	W	February 18, 1937	2–1	@ Montreal Maroons (1936–37)	18–15–5
39	T	February 21, 1937	2–2 OT	Montreal Canadiens (1936–37)	18–15–6
40	W	February 23, 1937	5–2	New York Americans (1936–37)	19–15–6
41	L	February 25, 1937	1–3	@ New York Americans (1936–37)	19–16–6

March

Game	Result	Date	Score	Opponent	Record
42	L	March 2, 1937	2–4	Chicago Black Hawks (1936–37)	19–17–6
43	W	March 7, 1937	1–0	@ New York Rangers (1936–37)	20–17–6
44	W	March 9, 1937	6–1	Detroit Red Wings (1936–37)	21–17–6
45	W	March 11, 1937	6–2	@ Chicago Black Hawks (1936–37)	22–17–6
46	L	March 14, 1937	1–2	@ Detroit Red Wings (1936–37)	22–18–6
47	T	March 16, 1937	1–1 OT	Toronto Maple Leafs (1936–37)	22–18–7
48	W	March 21, 1937	6–1	Chicago Black Hawks (1936–37)	23–18–7

Legend: Win (2 points) Loss (0 points) Tie (1 point)

== Playoffs ==
The Boston Bruins lost the Quarterfinals to the Montreal Maroons 2–1 and have lost the Quarterfinals two years in a row.

== Player statistics ==
=== Regular season ===
Scoring

Player	Pos	GP	G	A	Pts	PIM
Bill Cowley	C	46	13	22	35	4
Ray Getliffe	C/LW	48	16	15	31	28
Dit Clapper	RW/D	48	17	8	25	25
Charlie Sands	C/RW	47	18	5	23	6
Hooley Smith	C/RW	44	8	10	18	36
Red Beattie	LW	48	8	7	15	10
Cooney Weiland	C	48	6	9	15	6
Leroy Goldsworthy	RW	47	8	6	14	8
Flash Hollett	D	48	3	7	10	22
Milt Schmidt	C/D	26	2	8	10	15
Bun Cook	LW	40	4	5	9	8
Woody Dumart	LW	17	4	4	8	2
Joe Jerwa	D	26	3	5	8	30
Jack Portland	D	46	2	4	6	58
Nels Stewart	C	11	3	2	5	6
Eddie Shore	D	20	3	1	4	12
Al Shields	D	18	0	4	4	15
Jim O'Neil	C/RW	21	0	2	2	6
Bobby Bauer	RW	1	1	0	1	0
Lorne Duguid	LW	1	1	0	1	2
Ted Graham	D	1	0	0	0	0
Walter Kalbfleisch	D	1	0	0	0	0
Sylvio Mantha	D	4	0	0	0	2
Sammy McManus	LW	1	0	0	0	0
Tiny Thompson	G	48	0	0	0	0

Goaltending

Player	MIN	GP	W	L	T	GA	GAA	SO
Tiny Thompson	2970	48	23	18	7	110	2.22	6
Team:	2970	48	23	18	7	110	2.22	6

=== Playoffs ===
Scoring

Player	Pos	GP	G	A	Pts	PIM
Ray Getliffe	C/LW	3	2	1	3	2
Charlie Sands	C/RW	3	1	2	3	0
Bill Cowley	C	3	0	3	3	0
Dit Clapper	RW/D	3	2	0	2	5
Red Beattie	LW	3	1	0	1	0
Bobby Bauer	RW	1	0	0	0	0
Woody Dumart	LW	3	0	0	0	0
Leroy Goldsworthy	RW	3	0	0	0	0
Flash Hollett	D	3	0	0	0	2
Jack Portland	D	3	0	0	0	4
Milt Schmidt	C/D	3	0	0	0	0
Al Shields	D	3	0	0	0	2
Hooley Smith	C/RW	3	0	0	0	0
Tiny Thompson	G	3	0	0	0	0
Cooney Weiland	C	3	0	0	0	0

Goaltending

Player	MIN	GP	W	L	GA	GAA	SO
Tiny Thompson	180	3	1	2	8	2.67	1
Team:	180	3	1	2	8	2.67	1

Note:

Pos = Position;GP = Games played; G = Goals; A = Assists; Pts = Points; PIM = Penalty minutes; +/- = Plus/minus; PPG = Power-play goals; SHG = Short-handed goals; GWG = Game-winning goals
Pos = Position;GP = Games played; Min, TOI = Minutes played; W = Wins; L = Losses; T,T/OT = Ties; OTL = Overtime losses; GA = Goals-against; GAA = Goals-against average; SO = Shutouts; SA = Shots against; SV = Shots saved;SV% = Save percentage;

== See also ==
- 1936–37 NHL season
