= Ebbie Goodfellow =

Canadian ice hockey player (1907–1985)

- Hockey Hall of Fame, 1963
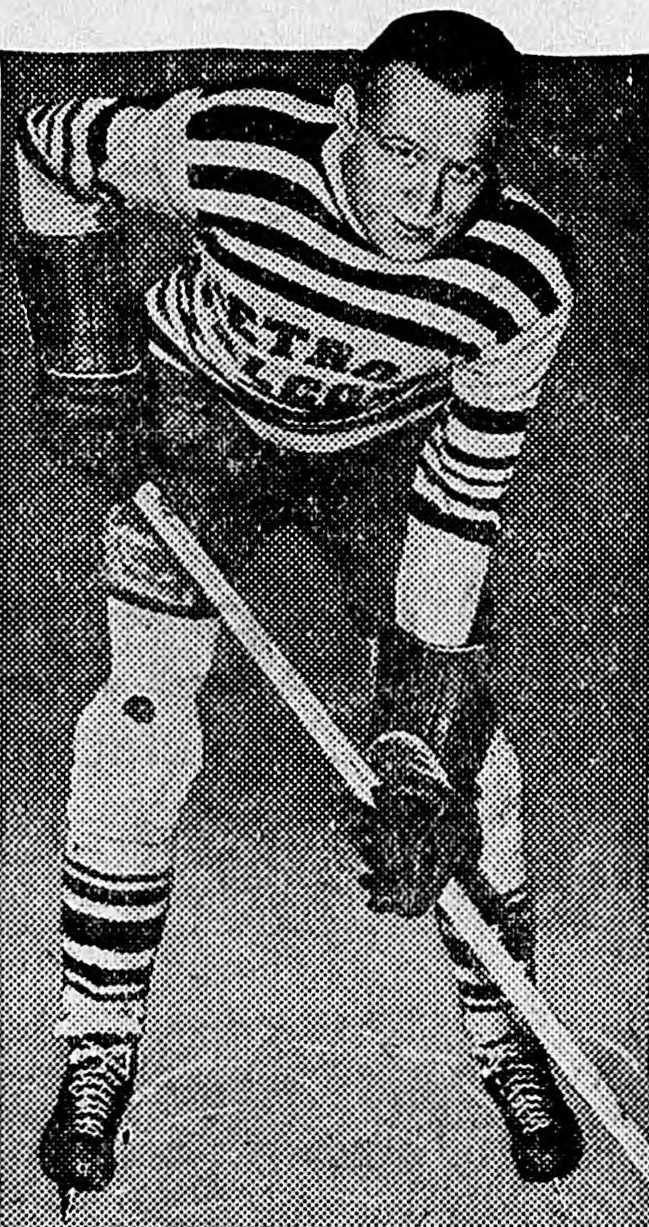
- Goodfellow, circa 1931
- Born: April 9, 1907 Ottawa, Ontario, Canada
- Died: September 10, 1985 (aged 78) Sarasota, Florida, U.S.
- Height: 6 ft 0 in (183 cm)
- Weight: 175 lb (79 kg; 12 st 7 lb)
- Position: Centre/Defence
- Shot: Left
- Played for: Detroit Red Wings
- Playing career: 1928–1943

Ebenezer Robertson "Poker Face" Goodfellow (April 9, 1907 – September 10, 1985) was a Canadian professional ice hockey player and coach. Goodfellow played in the National Hockey League (NHL) for the Detroit Red Wings from 1928 to 1943 as both a forward and defenceman. He helped the Red Wings win the Stanley Cup in 1935–36, 1936–37 and 1942–43. He served as captain of the Wings for five seasons, and in 1939–40 was the first Red Wing to win the NHL's Hart Trophy as his team's most valuable player. After retiring from playing, he coached in the American Hockey League (AHL) and later with the Chicago Black Hawks of the NHL.

== Hockey career ==
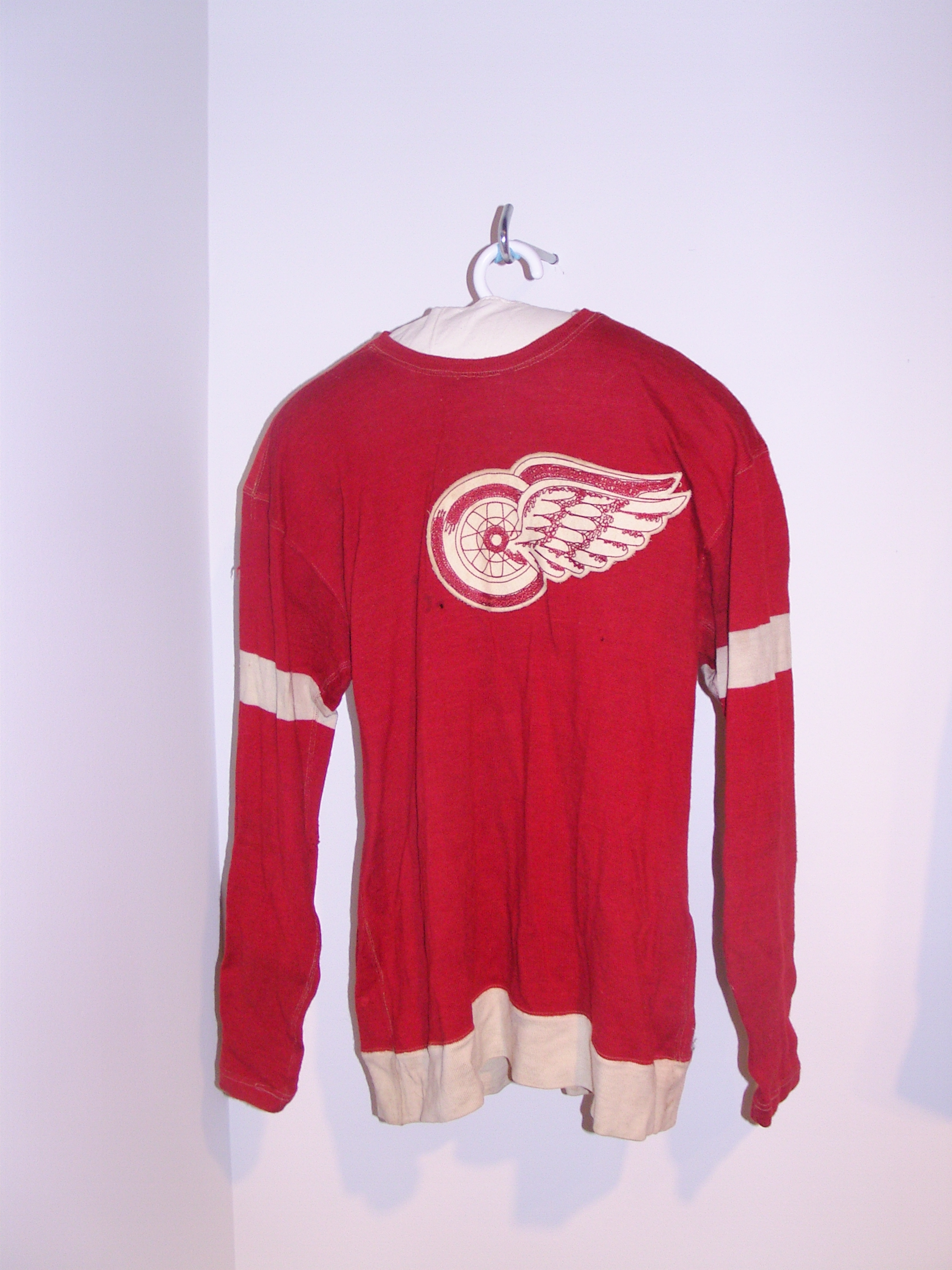
Goodfellow's jersey, now in the collection of the City of Ottawa Archives.

While still a junior, Goodfellow signed a contract with the professional Saskatoon Sheiks of the Western Canada Hockey League on December 25, 1924. When Saskatoon called him up in December 1926, he refused to report and played senior hockey with the Ottawa Montagnards of the Ottawa City Hockey League instead. In February 1927, his professional rights were sold to the Detroit Olympics of the AHL for $4,000. Goodfellow remained in Ottawa and was a member of the Montagnards' 1927–28 senior championship team. In 1928, he joined the Olympics and played with the club for one season. The following year, he signed with the Detroit Cougars of the NHL, starting a fourteen-year career with the team. Goodfellow was a high-scoring forward and the original center in a famous line with Herbie Lewis and Larry Aurie. During the 1930–31 season, he scored 25 goals (a franchise record that stood for fourteen years) and 48 points and was second to Howie Morenz in league scoring. After three seasons Goodfellow switched to defence, and at that position he won the Hart Memorial Trophy in 1940 and was named to the All-Star Team three times.

Goodfellow missed most of the 1942–43 season due to injury, but when coach Jack Adams was suspended during the 1943 playoffs, Goodfellow agreed to serve as coach during the suspension. Detroit went on to win the Stanley Cup, and Goodfellow's name was engraved on the Cup for a third and final time. He was one of the last NHL players to have his name engraved on the Stanley Cup as both player and coach, as league rules changed and playing coaches were disallowed. Goodfellow retired the following season after knee problems began to slow him down.

At the start of the 1947-48 season Goodfellow was persuaded out of retirement by the St. Louis Flyers of the American Hockey League (AHL). In two years as coach of the Flyers, he led them from last place to the AHL Western Division Championship, the team's highest achievement to that date. Goodfellow then became coach of the Chicago Black Hawks in 1950. After two lacklustre seasons with the Black Hawks, Goodfellow retired from the NHL for good.

In 1959 Goodfellow took part in founding the Detroit Red Wings Alumni Association, a charitable organization still in operation today. He was inducted into the Hockey Hall of Fame in 1963 and served for twenty-one years on the Hall's selection committee. He was an avid golfer and one-time caddy master at Oakland Hills Country Club in Bloomfield Hills, Michigan. He died of cancer on September 10, 1985, in Sarasota, Florida, and is buried at White Chapel Cemetery in Troy, Michigan.

== Career statistics ==
=== Regular season and playoffs ===
			Regular season					Playoffs
Season	Team	League	GP	G	A	Pts	PIM	GP	G	A	Pts	PIM
1926–27	Ottawa Montagnards	OCHL	4	3	1	4	—	—	—	—	—	—
1927–28	Ottawa Montagnards	OCHL	15	7	2	9	—	4	3	1	4	—
1927–28	Ottawa Montagnards	Al-Cup	—	—	—	—	—	2	1	0	1	—
1928–29	Detroit Olympics	CPHL	42	26	8	34	45	—	—	—	—	—
1929–30	Detroit Cougars	NHL	44	17	17	34	54	—	—	—	—	—
1930–31	Detroit Falcons	NHL	44	25	23	48	32	—	—	—	—	—
1931–32	Detroit Falcons	NHL	48	14	16	30	56	2	0	0	0	0
1932–33	Detroit Red Wings	NHL	40	12	8	20	47	4	1	0	1	11
1933–34	Detroit Red Wings	NHL	48	13	13	26	45	9	4	3	7	12
1934–35	Detroit Red Wings	NHL	48	12	24	36	44	—	—	—	—	—
1935–36	Detroit Red Wings	NHL	48	5	8	13	69	7	1	0	1	4
1936–37	Detroit Red Wings	NHL	48	9	16	25	43	9	2	2	4	12
1937–38	Detroit Red Wings	NHL	29	0	7	7		—	—	—	—	—
1938–39	Detroit Red Wings	NHL	48	8	8	16	36	6	0	0	0	8
1939–40	Detroit Red Wings	NHL	43	11	17	28	31	5	0	2	2	9
1940–41	Detroit Red Wings	NHL	47	5	17	22	35	3	0	1	1	9
1941–42	Detroit Red Wings	NHL	8	2	2	4	2	—	—	—	—	—
1942–43	Detroit Red Wings	NHL	11	1	4	5	4	—	—	—	—	—
NHL totals			554	134	190	324	511	45	8	8	16	65

=== Awards ===
- NHL Second All-Star Team - 1935–36
- NHL First All-Star Team - 1936–37, 1939–40
- Hart Trophy (MVP) - 1939–40
- Hockey Hall of Fame - 1963
- Ottawa Sports Hall of Fame
- Michigan Sports Hall of Fame - 1968

== Coaching record ==
Team	Year	Regular season						Postseason
Team	Year	G	W	L	T	Pts	Division rank	Result
CHI	1950–51	70	13	47	10	36	6th in NHL	DNQ
CHI	1951–52	70	17	44	9	43	6th in NHL	DNQ
Total		140	30	91	19	79		

Preceded by Toe Blake	Winner of the Hart Memorial Trophy; 1940	Succeeded by Bill Cowley
Preceded by Herbie Lewis	Detroit Red Wings captain 1934–35	Succeeded by Doug Young
Preceded by Doug Young	Detroit Red Wings captain 1938–41	Succeeded by Syd Howe
Preceded by Charlie Conacher	Head coach of the Chicago Black Hawks; 1950–52	Succeeded by Sid Abel
