= Howard Mackie (ice hockey) =

Canadian ice hockey player

- Born: August 30, 1913 Berlin, Ontario, Canada
- Died: March 9, 1952 (aged 38)
- Height: 5 ft 10 in (178 cm)
- Weight: 190 lb (86 kg; 13 st 8 lb)
- Position: Right Wing
- Shot: Left
- Played for: Detroit Red Wings
- Playing career: 1932–1946

Cecil Howard Mackie (August 30, 1913 – March 9, 1952) was a Canadian ice hockey player who played 16 games in the National Hockey League with the Detroit Red Wings during the 1936–37 and 1937–38 seasons. The rest of his career, which lasted from 1932 to 1946, was mainly spent in the International American Hockey League/American Hockey League. While with Detroit, Mackie won the Stanley Cup in 1937. He died of a heart attack on March 9, 1952.

== Career statistics ==
=== Regular season and playoffs ===
			Regular season					Playoffs
Season	Team	League	GP	G	A	Pts	PIM	GP	G	A	Pts	PIM
1930–31	Kitchener Redshirts	OHA	8	2	0	2	8	2	1	0	1	6
1931–32	Kitchener Redshirts	OHA	12	10	0	10	24	—	—	—	—	—
1932–33	Kitchener Empires	OHA Sr	12	12	4	16	24	5	2	3	5	4
1933–34	Kitchener Redshirts	OHA	15	4	4	8	8	—	—	—	—	—
1934–35	Kitchener Greenshirts	OHA Sr	14	19	8	27	27	6	9	3	12	6
1935–36	Hamilton Tigers	OHA Sr	22	24	11	35	21	9	14	3	17	14
1935–36	Hamilton Tigers	Al-Cup	—	—	—	—	—	4	5	4	9	4
1936–37	Detroit Red Wings	NHL	9	1	0	1	4	8	0	0	0	0
1936–37	Pittsburgh Hornets	IAHL	33	8	5	13	12	1	0	0	0	0
1937–38	Detroit Red Wings	NHL	7	0	0	0	0	—	—	—	—	—
1937–38	Pittsburgh Hornets	IAHL	32	2	8	10	12	2	0	0	0	0
1938–39	Hershey Bears	IAHL	53	12	18	30	8	5	1	2	3	0
1939–40	Hershey Bears	IAHL	52	11	5	16	29	5	0	1	1	4
1940–41	Hershey Bears	AHL	43	15	19	34	19	10	0	2	2	4
1941–42	Hershey Bears	AHL	21	3	3	6	4	—	—	—	—	—
1941–42	Pittsburgh Hornets	AHL	1	0	0	0	0	—	—	—	—	—
1941–42	Philadelphia Rockets	AHL	21	12	12	24	8	—	—	—	—	—
1942–43	Pittsburgh Hornets	AHL	40	0	4	4	8	—	—	—	—	—
1943–44	Pittsburgh Hornets	AHL	29	2	11	13	21	—	—	—	—	—
1944–45	Pittsburgh Hornets	AHL	40	9	21	30	33	—	—	—	—	—
1945–46	Pittsburgh Hornets	AHL	31	5	9	14	31	4	0	0	0	0
IAHL/AHL totals			296	79	115	194	185	27	1	5	6	8
NHL totals			16	1	0	1	4	8	0	0	0	0
