= Allan Shields =

Canadian ice hockey player

- Born: May 10, 1907; Ottawa, Ontario, Canada
- Died: September 24, 1975 (aged 68)
- Height: 6 ft 0 in (183 cm)
- Weight: 196 lb (89 kg; 14 st 0 lb)
- Position: Defence
- Shot: Right
- Played for: Ottawa Senators; Philadelphia Quakers; New York Americans; Montreal Maroons; Boston Bruins
- Playing career: 1927–1942

John Allan Shields (May 10, 1907 - September 24, 1975) was a Canadian professional ice hockey defenceman who played eleven seasons in the National Hockey League for the Ottawa Senators, Philadelphia Quakers, New York Americans, Montreal Maroons and Boston Bruins between 1927 and 1938.

== Playing career ==
During the 1934–35 NHL season Shields won the Stanley Cup Championship with the Montreal Maroons.

== Awards and achievements ==
Shields played in the longest game in NHL history: Montreal Maroons vs. Detroit Red Wings, March 1936.

In 1934 he was selected to the first NHL All-Star team ever assembled.

In 1930/31 he along with Syd Howe and Wally Kilrea were loaned from Ottawa to the Philadelphia Quakers to help liven up the team and attract more Quaker fans. Philly was in bad financial shape at the time and needed greater attendance to survive. With the assistance of Shields and company their games became "quite exciting", culminating with a Christmas Day game when the entire Philadelphia police force were called to quell a near riot. With the onset of the Depression, the team folded the following year. The Quakers set another near NHL record for games lost, however they were one of the more "lively" teams of the time.

On a couple of occasions during his career, he had to fill in as a goalie. In those days no spare goalie was available and if the one and only was injured during a game one of the players had to fill-in.

He played in the American Hockey League (the primary farm teams of the NHL) for the Washington Lions, Buffalo Bisons and the New Haven Eagles from 1938 to 1942. He served as playing coach for Washington and then enlisted in the RCAF. Shields was selected to All-Star teams twice during his AHL career

During his service in the airforce he was playing coach for the RCAF Sabres stationed in Arnprior, Ontario.

After the war, "Big Pete" went on to Referee in the AHL from 1946 to 1948 and then hung up his skates permanently.

He played a total of 457 game in professional hockey in the days when bus and train were the only means of transport.

Shields was reported in the media at the time, as "a clean, rugged player" and "one of the most valuable defensemen in the entire league". King Clancy who was best man at Shields' wedding, had nothing but praise for his ability as a defenseman.

== Career statistics ==
=== Regular season and playoffs ===
			Regular season					Playoffs
Season	Team	League	GP	G	A	Pts	PIM	GP	G	A	Pts	PIM
1927–28	Ottawa Montagnards	OCHL	15	6	0	6	—	4	0	0	0	0
1927–28	New Haven Eagles	Can-Am	5	0	0	0	0	—	—	—	—	—
1927–28	Ottawa Senators	NHL	7	0	1	1	2	2	0	0	0	0
1927–28	Ottawa Montagnards	Al-Cup	—	—	—	—	—	2	0	0	0	0
1928–29	Ottawa Senators	NHL	42	0	1	1	10	—	—	—	—	—
1928–29	St. Louis Flyers	AHA	6	1	1	2	2	—	—	—	—	—
1929–30	Ottawa Senators	NHL	44	6	3	9	32	2	0	0	0	0
1930–31	Philadelphia Quakers	NHL	43	7	3	10	98	—	—	—	—	—
1931–32	New York Americans	NHL	48	4	1	5	45	—	—	—	—	—
1932–33	Ottawa Senators	NHL	48	7	4	11	119	—	—	—	—	—
1933–34	Ottawa Senators	NHL	47	4	7	11	44	—	—	—	—	—
1934–35	Montreal Maroons	NHL	42	4	8	12	45	7	0	1	1	6
1935–36	Montreal Maroons	NHL	45	2	7	9	81	3	0	0	0	6
1936–37	New York Americans	NHL	27	3	0	3	79	—	—	—	—	—
1936–37	Boston Bruins	NHL	18	0	4	4	15	3	0	0	0	2
1937–38	Montreal Maroons	NHL	48	5	7	12	67	—	—	—	—	—
1938–39	New Haven Eagles	IAHL	25	2	2	4	17	—	—	—	—	—
1939–40	New Haven Eagles	IAHL	45	5	9	14	26	3	0	2	2	2
1940–41	New Haven Eagles	AHL	48	9	16	25	59	2	0	0	0	2
1940–41	Buffalo Bisons	AHL	3	0	0	0	0	—	—	—	—	—
1941–42	Washington Lions	AHL	51	3	10	13	24	2	0	0	0	0
1942–43	Arnprior RCAF	OVHL	8	4	6	10	16	2	0	1	1	4
1943–44	Arnprior RCAF	OVHL	5	1	3	4	6	—	—	—	—	—
NHL totals			459	42	46	88	637	17	0	1	1	14
