= Marty Barry =

Canadian ice hockey player (1905–1969)

- Hockey Hall of Fame, 1965
- Born: December 8, 1905 Quebec City, Quebec, Canada
- Died: August 20, 1969 (aged 63) Halifax, Nova Scotia, Canada
- Height: 6 ft 0 in (183 cm)
- Weight: 195 lb (88 kg; 13 st 13 lb)
- Position: Centre
- Shot: Left
- Played for: New York Americans; Boston Bruins; Detroit Red Wings; Montreal Canadiens
- Playing career: 1927–1941

Martin James Barry (December 8, 1905 – August 20, 1969) was a Canadian professional ice hockey forward who played for the New York Americans, Boston Bruins, Detroit Red Wings, and Montreal Canadiens in the National Hockey League (NHL) between 1927 and 1940. Barry was frequently among the league's leading scorers, and after winning his first Stanley Cup with the Red Wings in 1936, he scored the championship winning goal in 1937. Barry won the Lady Byng Trophy in 1936–37 as the NHL's most gentlemanly player and was named to the first All-Star team. Following his playing career, Barry coached junior and senior teams in Halifax, Nova Scotia, for many years. He was inducted into the Hockey Hall of Fame in 1965.

== Playing career ==
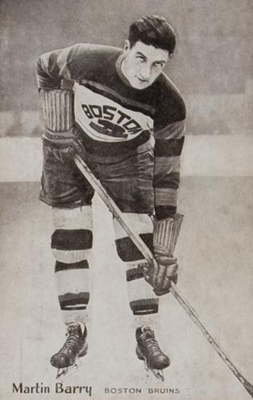
1935 card of Barry for Boston Bruins

Barry was born December 8, 1905, in Quebec City, Quebec, but grew up in Montreal and played amateur hockey for various teams in the city where he earned the nickname "goal-a-game Barry". Both the Montreal Canadiens and Montreal Maroons passed him over, so Barry signed with the New York Americans in 1927. He made his National Hockey League (NHL) debut in 1927–28 and scored one goal in nine games for New York. Barry spent the majority of the season in the Canadian-American Hockey League (Can-Am League) with the Philadelphia Arrows. He remained in the Can-Am League for the 1928–29 season where he was a member of the New Haven Eagles. Barry led the league in both goals, 19, and points, 29. Barry battled Art Chapman for the scoring title, which he ultimately won on the final day of the season.

The Boston Bruins claimed Barry from the Americans in the Intra-League Draft in May 1929, and from that point he remained in the NHL. He missed only two games total in the following ten seasons. Barry recorded 18 goals and 33 points in 1929–30 for a Bruins team that set an NHL record with 38 wins in a 44-game season. Barry scored three playoff goals to help Boston eliminate the Maroons in the semi-final, but Boston was defeated by the Canadiens in the 1930 Stanley Cup Final. Barry rapidly developed into one of Boston's top offensive threats; he averaged 23 goals per season in his six years with the team. The Bruins named him team captain in 1933, led the team in goals for three consecutive seasons between 1931 and 1934 with 21, 24 and 27 respectively, and was the team's leading point scorer three times between 1932 and 1935. He was also among the league scoring leaders and finished seventh in the NHL with 37 points in 1932–33, fourth with 39 points in 1933–34 and eighth with 40 in 1934–35.

A disputed goal by Barry was the flashpoint in the first ever NHL forfeit on March 14, 1933. Barry scored a controversial overtime goal for Boston in a home game versus the Chicago Black Hawks. (At the time, NHL overtime for regular-season play consisted of a full 10-minute period.) An enraged Chicago coach, Tommy Gorman, punched referee Bill Stewart. Stewart summoned the police to remove Gorman from the visitors' bench. The Black Hawk players refused to continue the game without their coach. The game was forfeited to Boston shortly thereafter.

Barry was involved in a major trade prior to the 1935–36 season. The Bruins sent Barry and Art Giroux to the Detroit Red Wings on June 30, 1935, in exchange for Cooney Weiland and Walt Buswell. With Detroit, Barry centred a high-scoring line with Herbie Lewis and Larry Aurie as his wings. Barry finished third in the NHL with 21 goals and second with 40 points. In the opening game of the playoffs, Barry played in the longest game in NHL history, a 1–0 victory over the Montreal Maroons that required six overtime periods to determine a winner.

"The rink seemed like it was miles long about 10 minutes to 2 o'clock in the morning. Players of both teams were praying for somebody to score before we all fell from exhaustion."

— Barry describing what it felt like to play in the longest game in NHL history.

The Red Wings defeated the Maroons in the playoff semi-final before defeating the Toronto Maple Leafs in the 1936 Stanley Cup Final to claim Detroit's first NHL championship. Barry scored a goal in the clinching game, a 3–2 Detroit victory. Barry was a central figure for Detroit as the Red Wings repeated as champions in 1936–37. He finished third in regular season scoring with 44 points, then led all players in goals (4), assists (7) and points (11) in the playoffs. In the clinching victory over the New York Rangers in the 1937 Stanley Cup Final, Barry scored twice – including the Cup-clinching goal – and added an assist in a 3–0 victory. He was named to the NHL's First All-Star team at centre and won the Lady Byng Trophy as the league's most gentlemanly player.

After a 1937–38 season in which Barry scored only nine goals, he returned to the NHL leader board by finishing fourth with 41 points in 1938–39. The Red Wings spent several months attempting to trade the 34-year-old Barry to the Canadiens. When Montreal feigned a lack of interest, Detroit eventually granted him his outright release and made him a free agent shortly before the 1939–40 season began. Two days after his release, the Canadiens signed Barry to a contract. His tenure with Montreal was short-lived, however. After scoring only four goals and 14 points in 30 games, Montreal released Barry from his contract. He signed on with the Pittsburgh Hornets of the International-American Hockey League (IAHL) to complete the year. Barry played his final season of professional hockey in 1940–41 in the dual role of player-coach for the Minneapolis Millers of the American Hockey Association (AHA).

Barry retired with 195 goals and 387 points in 509 NHL games. He was regarded as one of the league's best playmakers during his career and possessed a good scoring touch in-close around the net. Barry was inducted into the Hockey Hall of Fame in 1965.

== Personal life ==
Barry coached the Millers for one more season in 1941–42. He then settled with his wife and three surviving children (one died shortly after childbirth) in Halifax, Nova Scotia. Barry managed a grocery store in nearby Dartmouth, Nova Scotia. Remaining active in hockey, Barry coached the St. Mary's Juniors in Halifax for many years throughout the 1940s and into the 1950s. He also coached the Halifax Crescents of the Maritime Senior League for a time. Barry's junior team won Maritime championships and reached the eastern final of the 1947 Memorial Cup. Hoping to raise the quality of competition for his team, Barry convinced teams from as far away as Montreal to play in Halifax and exposed his players to professional scouts. In recognition of his contributions, he was an original inductee of the Nova Scotia Sport Hall of Fame when it opened in 1964. Barry died of a heart attack at his home on August 20, 1969.

== Career statistics ==
=== Regular season and playoffs ===
			Regular season					Playoffs
Season	Team	League	GP	G	A	Pts	PIM	GP	G	A	Pts	PIM
1924–25	Montreal St. Anthony's	MCHL	—	—	—	—	—	—	—	—	—	—
1924–25	Montreal St. Ann's	ECHL	1	0	0	0	0	—	—	—	—	—
1925–26	Montreal St. Anthony's	MCHL	—	—	—	—	—	—	—	—	—	—
1926–27	Montreal Bell Telephone	MCHL	—	—	—	—	—	—	—	—	—	—
1927–28	New York Americans	NHL	9	1	0	1	2	—	—	—	—	—
1927–28	Philadelphia Arrows	Can-Am	33	11	3	14	70	—	—	—	—	—
1928–29	New Haven Eagles	Can-Am	35	19	10	29	54	2	0	1	1	2
1929–30	Boston Bruins	NHL	44	18	15	33	34	6	3	3	6	14
1930–31	Boston Bruins	NHL	44	20	11	31	26	5	1	1	2	4
1931–32	Boston Bruins	NHL	48	21	17	38	22	—	—	—	—	—
1932–33	Boston Bruins	NHL	47	24	13	37	40	5	2	2	4	6
1933–34	Boston Bruins	NHL	48	27	12	39	12	—	—	—	—	—
1934–35	Boston Bruins	NHL	48	20	20	40	33	4	0	0	0	2
1935–36	Detroit Red Wings	NHL	48	21	19	40	16	7	2	4	6	6
1936–37	Detroit Red Wings	NHL	47	17	27	44	6	10	4	7	11	2
1937–38	Detroit Red Wings	NHL	48	9	20	29	34	—	—	—	—	—
1938–39	Detroit Red Wings	NHL	48	13	28	41	4	6	3	1	4	0
1939–40	Montreal Canadiens	NHL	30	4	10	14	2	—	—	—	—	—
1939–40	Pittsburgh Hornets	IAHL	6	2	0	2	0	7	2	1	3	4
1940–41	Minneapolis Millers	AHA	32	10	10	20	8	3	1	0	1	0
NHL totals			509	195	192	387	231	43	15	18	33	34

== Awards and honours ==
In 2023, Barry was named one of the top 100 Bruins players of all time.

National Hockey League
Award	Year	Ref.
Stanley Cup champion	1935–36; 1936–37	
First team All-Star	1936–37	
Lady Byng Trophy; Most gentlemanly player	1936–37	

Preceded by Elwyn Romnes	Winner of the Lady Byng Trophy; 1937	Succeeded by Gordie Drillon
Preceded by Dit Clapper	Boston Bruins captain 1933–34	Succeeded by Nels Stewart
