= Larry Aurie =

Canadian ice hockey player

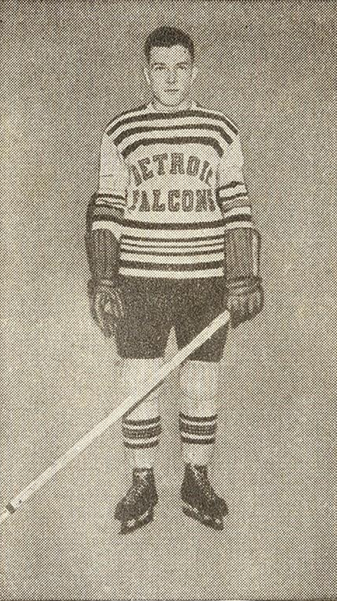
- Aurie with the Detroit Falcons, c. 1933
- Born: February 8, 1905 Sudbury, Ontario, Canada
- Died: December 12, 1952 (aged 47) Detroit, Michigan, U.S.
- Height: 5 ft 6 in (168 cm)
- Weight: 148 lb (67 kg; 10 st 8 lb)
- Position: Right wing
- Shot: Right
- Played for: Detroit Red Wings
- Playing career: 1926–1944

Lawrence Henry "Little Dempsey" Aurie (February 8, 1905 – December 11, 1952) was a Canadian professional ice hockey right winger who played 11 seasons in the National Hockey League for the Detroit Red Wings.

== Playing career ==
Aurie began his professional hockey career in 1926 with the London Panthers of the Canadian Professional Hockey League (CPHL). The following season, he moved up to the NHL to play with the then-Detroit Cougars. He remained with the team, later known as the Falcons and Red Wings, until his retirement in 1938. He was known for his remarkable all-around play, goal-scoring achievements and for being instrumental in the Red Wings' winning their first two Stanley Cup championships in 1936 and 1937.

His dedication to off-season fitness with his short stature (5 foot 6 inches) earned him the nicknames "Little Dempsey" (for his fistic abilities) and "The Little Rag Man" (for his remarkable and entertaining ability to control or "rag" the puck during penalty killing).

Twice during his career, Aurie led the Wings in assists and in 1933–34, his 35 points topped the club in scoring. He was third in NHL scoring with a career-high 46 points in 1934–35 and fourth overall in 1936–37 with 43 points. He and Herbie Lewis represented the Red Wings at the first ever NHL All Star Game in 1934.

Aurie captained the team in the 1932–33 season, led the league in playoff scoring in 1934 with 10 points in nine games and led the league in goal scoring in 1937 with 23 while earning a first-team selection on the post-season NHL All-Star team.

He was part of the Wings' first big line, playing alongside center Marty Barry and left wing Lewis. His selfless play and hustle made him a favorite of owner James Norris, who called him the heart of the franchise.

Aurie scored his NHL leading 23rd goal on March 11, 1937, in a 4–2 win over the New York Rangers, but later in the game fractured his leg in a collision with Rangers' defenceman Art Coulter, ending his season. Aurie's season leading scoring performance earned him a berth on the NHL first All-Star team. Unfortunately, this was Aurie's last strong season. The lingering effects of his fractured leg began to affect his play and in 1937–38, he dropped to 10 goals and 19 points and was forced to retire after the season at age 33. After the season, team owner James Norris decided to honor Aurie by retiring his jersey No. 6 - the first Red Wing so honoured.

The following season, Aurie was named player-coach of Detroit's AHL farm club, the Pittsburgh Hornets, but returned to the Red Wings for one final game on January 10 – scoring the winning goal against Montreal in a 3–0 shutout at Detroit. Aurie would later go on to head coach the Oshawa Generals.

== Retirement ==
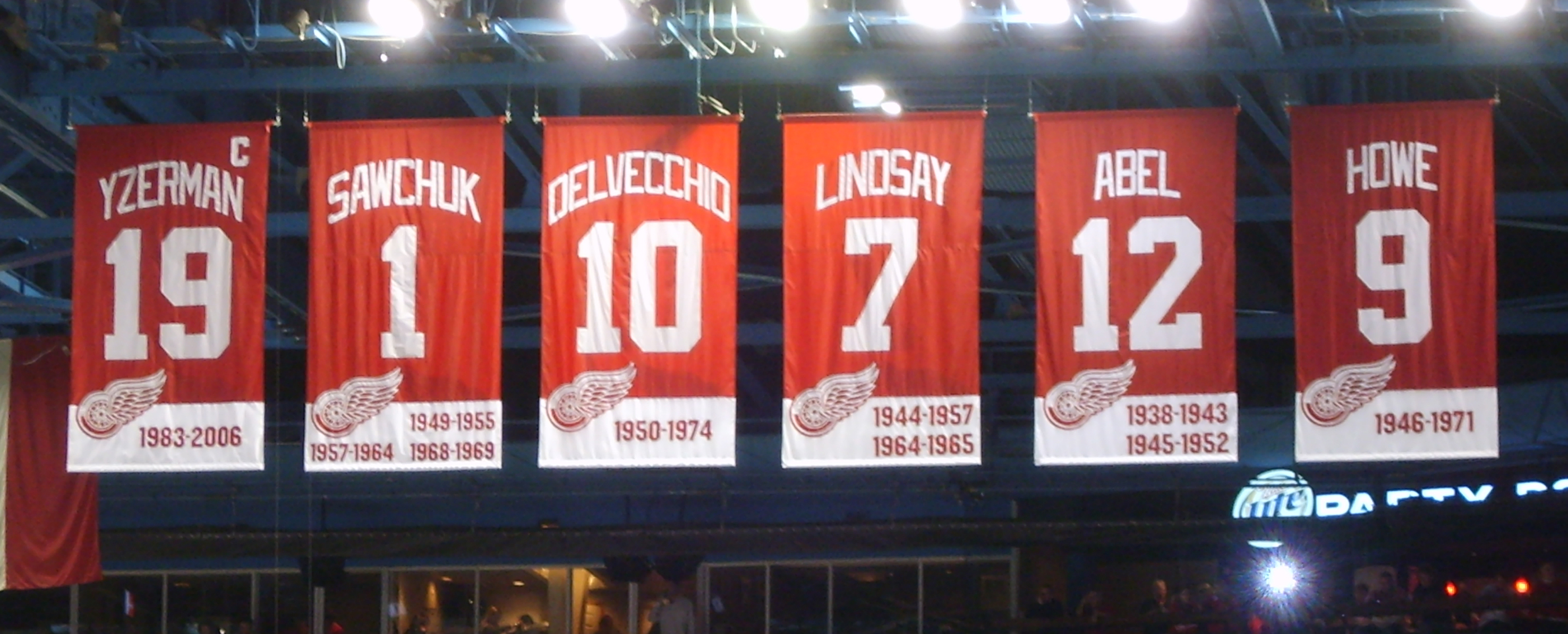

Aurie's No. 6 jersey was officially retired by Wings owner James Norris after the 1937–38 season (he returned to play one more game for Detroit on January 10, 1939), but was reissued once in the late 1950s to his cousin (not nephew as has been widely reported) Cummy Burton, with the family's blessing. His jersey was displayed in the Olympia Stadium lobby during the 1960s, but then-owner Mike Ilitch refused to display the number at Joe Louis Arena with the other retired numbers, despite several published accounts to support the retirement of the number.

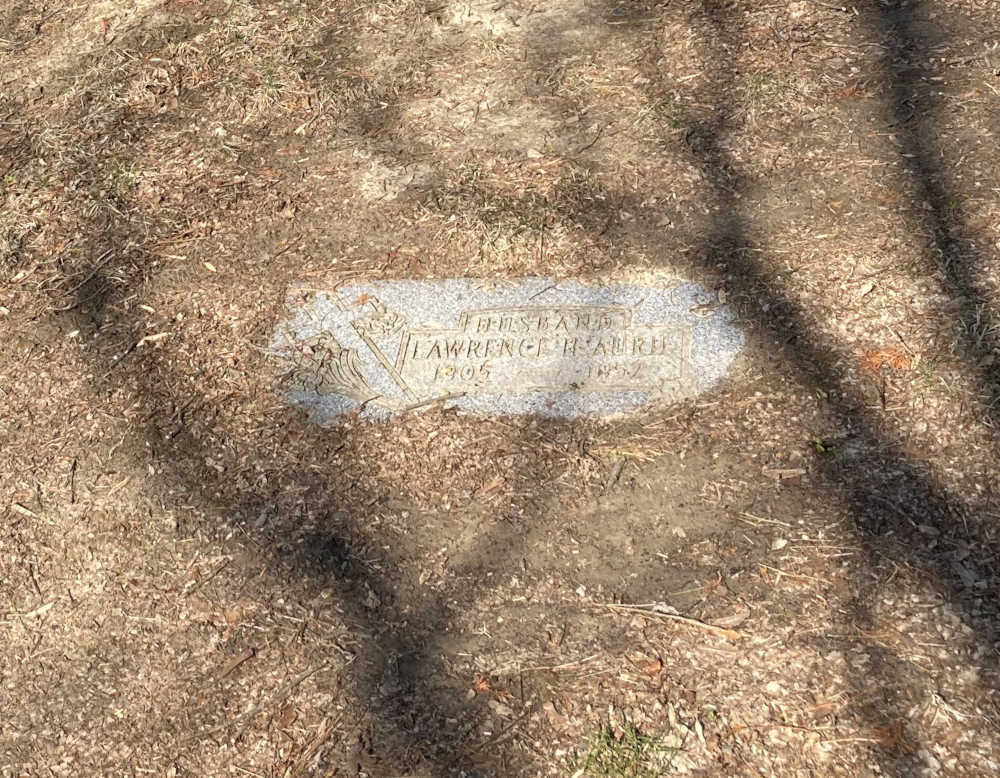
Aurie's grave at Holy Sepulchre Cemetery

In a 1997 Detroit Free Press article, Wings vice president Jim Devellano said the team refused to hang the number because he was not a Hall of Famer, even though the number was already retired before Ilitch became the owner in 1982. However, it has long been understood that no Red Wing will ever wear it again.

Aurie died in Detroit's Mount Carmel Mercy Hospital on December 12, 1952, having suffered a stroke while driving his car the previous evening. He was buried at Holy Sepulchre Cemetery, in Southfield, Michigan.

== Awards and achievements ==
- IAHL second All-Star team, 1939
- Led NHL in goals in 1936–37
- Named to NHL first All-Star team, 1936–37
- Played in NHL All-Star Game, 1933–34
- Won the Stanley Cup (with the Detroit Red Wings) 1936, 1937

== Career statistics ==
=== Regular season and playoffs ===
			Regular season					Playoffs
Season	Team	League	GP	G	A	Pts	PIM	GP	G	A	Pts	PIM
1921–22	Sudbury Cub Wolves	NOJHA	4	5	2	7	2	2	2	1	3	0
1922–23	Toronto St. Michael's Majors	OHA-Jr.	7	16	4	20	—	3	2	0	2	—
1923–24	Sudbury Wolves	NOHA	—	—	—	—	—	—	—	—	—	—
1924–25	Sudbury Wolves	NOHA	—	—	—	—	—	—	—	—	—	—
1925–26	Galt Terriers	OHA-Sr.	20	11	4	15	35	2	0	0	0	0
1926–27	London Panthers	Can-Pro	32	14	7	21	38	4	4	0	4	4
1927–28	Detroit Cougars	NHL	44	13	3	16	43	—	—	—	—	—
1928–29	Detroit Cougars	NHL	35	1	1	2	26	2	1	0	1	2
1929–30	Detroit Cougars	NHL	43	14	5	19	28	—	—	—	—	—
1930–31	Detroit Falcons	NHL	41	12	6	18	23	—	—	—	—	—
1931–32	Detroit Falcons	NHL	48	12	8	20	18	2	0	0	0	0
1932–33	Detroit Red Wings	NHL	45	12	11	23	25	4	1	0	1	4
1933–34	Detroit Red Wings	NHL	48	16	19	35	36	9	3	7	10	2
1934–35	Detroit Red Wings	NHL	48	17	29	46	24	—	—	—	—	—
1935–36	Detroit Red Wings	NHL	44	16	18	34	17	7	1	2	3	2
1936–37	Detroit Red Wings	NHL	45	23	20	43	20	—	—	—	—	—
1937–38	Detroit Red Wings	NHL	47	10	9	19	19	—	—	—	—	—
1938–39	Detroit Red Wings	NHL	1	1	0	1	0	—	—	—	—	—
1938–39	Pittsburgh Hornets	IAHL	39	8	19	27	16	—	—	—	—	—
1939–40	Pittsburgh Hornets	IAHL	39	12	12	24	12	9	3	8	11	4
1940–41	Pittsburgh Hornets	AHL	6	0	3	3	2	—	—	—	—	—
1943–44	Pittsburgh Hornets	AHL	1	0	0	0	0	—	—	—	—	—
NHL totals			489	147	129	276	279	24	6	9	15	10

== Coaching statistics ==
Season  Team               Lge  Type        GP  W  L T OTL    Pct    Result
1938-39 Pittsburgh Hornets IAHL Player-Head 54 22 28 4   0 0.44444
1939-40 Pittsburgh Hornets IAHL Head        56 25 22 9   0 0.52679
1940-41 Pittsburgh Hornets AHL  Head        56 21 29 6   0 0.42857 Lost in round 2
1941-42 Pittsburgh Hornets AHL  Head        56 23 28 5   0 0.45536 Out of Playoffs
1942-43 Pittsburgh Hornets AHL  Head        56 26 24 6   0 0.51786 Lost in round 1
1943-44 Pittsburgh Hornets AHL  Head        52 12 31 9   0 0.31731 Out of Playoffs

== See also ==
- List of NHL players who spent their entire career with one franchise

Preceded by Detroit Falcons captains Carson Cooper	Detroit Red Wings captain 1932–33	Succeeded by Herbie Lewis
