= Rolly Roulston =

Canadian ice hockey player

- Born: April 12, 1911; Toronto, Ontario, Canada
- Died: April 24, 1983 (aged 72)
- Height: 6 ft 1 in (185 cm)
- Weight: 195 lb (88 kg; 13 st 13 lb)
- Position: Left wing
- Shot: Left
- Played for: Detroit Red Wings
- Playing career: 1930–1942

Orville William "Rolly" Roulston (April 12, 1911 – April 24, 1983) was a Canadian professional ice hockey defenceman who played 24 games in the National Hockey League for the Detroit Red Wings in three separate seasons between 1936 and 1938. Roulston missed most of the 1936-37 season due to an injury, but his name was still engraved on the Stanley Cup as a member of the champion Detroit Red Wings. The rest of his career, which lasted from 1930 to 1942, was spent in various minor leagues. He was born in Toronto, Ontario.

== Career statistics ==
=== Regular season and playoffs ===
			Regular season					Playoffs
Season	Team	League	GP	G	A	Pts	PIM	GP	G	A	Pts	PIM
1928–29	Toronto Canoe Club	OHA	1	0	0	0	—	—	—	—	—	—
1929–30	Toronto Canoe Club	OHA	9	3	0	3	10	—	—	—	—	—
1930–31	Portland Buckaroos	PCHL	34	3	0	3	68	—	—	—	—	—
1931–32	Cleveland Indians	IHL	36	0	3	3	34	—	—	—	—	—
1932–33	Cleveland Indians	IHL	10	0	0	0	2	—	—	—	—	—
1932–33	Hershey B'ars	TriSHL	10	10	1	11	4	2	1	0	1	0
1933–34	Tulsa Oilers	AHA	47	20	12	32	36	4	0	0	0	2
1933–34	Wichita Vikings	AHA	1	0	0	0	6	4	0	0	0	2
1934–35	Detroit Olympics	IHL	45	5	3	8	25	5	0	1	1	2
1934–35	Windsor Bulldogs	IHL	2	0	0	0	0	—	—	—	—	—
1935–36	Detroit Red Wings	NHL	1	0	0	0	0	—	—	—	—	—
1935–36	Detroit Olympics	IHL	44	9	8	17	40	6	2	1	3	6
1936–37	Detroit Red Wings	NHL	21	0	5	5	10	—	—	—	—	—
1936–37	Pittsburgh Hornets	IAHL	10	3	1	4	10	—	—	—	—	—
1937–38	Detroit Red Wings	NHL	2	0	1	1	0	—	—	—	—	—
1937–38	Pittsburgh Hornets	IAHL	48	4	5	9	31	2	0	1	1	0
1938–39	Hershey Bears	IAHL	52	3	14	17	75	5	2	0	2	4
1939–40	Hershey Bears	IAHL	45	7	12	19	22	6	1	0	1	4
1940–41	Hershey Bears	AHL	50	4	9	13	20	10	0	0	0	4
1941–42	Philadelphia Rockets	AHL	36	6	9	15	16	—	—	—	—	—
1941–42	Pittsburgh Hornets	AHL	1	0	0	0	0	—	—	—	—	—
IAHL/AHL totals			245	27	50	77	174	23	3	1	4	12
NHL totals			24	0	6	6	10	—	—	—	—	—
