= Joe Cooper (ice hockey) =

Canadian ice hockey player

- Born: December 14, 1914 Winnipeg, Manitoba, Canada
- Died: April 3, 1979 (aged 64)
- Height: 6 ft 1 in (185 cm)
- Weight: 200 lb (91 kg; 14 st 4 lb)
- Position: Defence
- Shot: Right
- Played for: New York Rangers; Chicago Black Hawks
- Playing career: 1935–1947

Joseph Cooper (December 14, 1914 – April 3, 1979) was a Canadian ice hockey defenceman who played 414 games in the National Hockey League with the New York Rangers and Chicago Black Hawks between 1935 and 1947. He was born in Winnipeg, Manitoba.

== Career statistics ==
=== Regular season and playoffs ===
			Regular season					Playoffs
Season	Team	League	GP	G	A	Pts	PIM	GP	G	A	Pts	PIM
1931–32	Winnipeg K of C	WJrHL	2	0	0	0	0	—	—	—	—	—
1932–33	Winnipeg K of C	WJrHL	11	8	3	11	24	3	0	1	1	2
1933–34	Selkirk Fishermen	MJHL	13	12	3	15	28	5	3	4	7	17
1933–34	Selkirk Fishermen	MHL	1	0	0	0	6	—	—	—	—	—
1934–35	New York Crescents	EAHL	21	5	14	19	78	7	5	0	5	16
1935–36	New York Rangers	NHL	1	0	0	0	0	—	—	—	—	—
1935–36	Philadelphia Ramblers	Can-Am	48	5	10	15	86	4	1	0	1	6
1936–37	New York Rangers	NHL	48	0	3	3	42	9	1	1	2	12
1937–38	New York Rangers	NHL	46	3	2	5	56	3	0	0	0	4
1938–39	Chicago Black Hawks	NHL	17	3	3	6	10	—	—	—	—	—
1938–39	Philadelphia Ramblers	IAHL	35	8	15	23	50	—	—	—	—	—
1939–40	Chicago Black Hawks	NHL	44	4	8	12	59	2	0	0	0	0
1940–41	Chicago Black Hawks	NHL	45	5	5	10	76	5	1	0	1	8
1941–42	Chicago Black Hawks	NHL	47	6	14	20	58	3	0	2	2	2
1942–43	Ottawa Commandos	QSHL	12	4	4	8	22	—	—	—	—	—
1942–43	Ottawa Commandos	Al-Cup	—	—	—	—	—	12	4	6	10	18
1943–44	Chicago Black Hawks	NHL	13	1	0	1	17	9	1	1	2	18
1943–44	Ottawa Commandos	QSHL	10	0	1	1	18	—	—	—	—	—
1944–45	Chicago Black Hawks	NHL	50	4	17	21	50	—	—	—	—	—
1945–46	Chicago Black Hawks	NHL	50	2	7	9	46	4	0	1	1	14
1946–47	New York Rangers	NHL	59	2	8	10	36	—	—	—	—	—
1947–48	St. Louis Flyers	AHL	24	2	8	10	20	—	—	—	—	—
1947–48	Hershey Bears	AHL	20	5	6	11	36	2	0	0	0	2
NHL totals			420	30	67	97	450	35	3	5	8	58

== Awards and achievements ==
- EAHL First All-Star Team (1935)
- Can-Am First All-Star Team (1936)
- Honoured Member of the Manitoba Hockey Hall of Fame
