= Paul Runge (ice hockey) =

Canadian ice hockey player

- Born: September 10, 1907 Edmonton, Alberta, Canada
- Died: April 27, 1972 (aged 64) Vancouver, British Columbia, Canada
- Height: 5 ft 11 in (180 cm)
- Weight: 175 lb (79 kg; 12 st 7 lb)
- Position: Centre
- Shot: Left
- Played for: Boston Bruins; Montreal Canadiens; Montreal Maroons
- Playing career: 1928–1942

Paul August Runge (September 10, 1907 – April 27, 1972) was a Canadian professional ice hockey player who played 142 games in the National Hockey League between 1930 and 1938.

== Early life ==
Runge was born in Edmonton, Alberta. He played junior hockey with the Portland Buckaroos and Victoria Cubs.

== Career ==
Runge played for the Boston Bruins (1930–32, 1936), Montreal Maroons (1933–34, 1936–38), and Montreal Canadiens (1934–36, 1936). The rest of his career, which lasted from 1928 to 1942, was spent in various minor leagues.

Runge played parts of four NHL seasons without recording a goal. His first goal came as a member of the Boston Bruins in his team's 6-3 victory over the Montreal Maroons on December 28, 1935, played at the Montreal Forum. Runge scored eight times for Boston in the 1935-36 season, and eventually tallied 18 NHL goals and 22 assists for 40 career points.

== Career statistics ==
=== Regular season and playoffs ===
			Regular season					Playoffs
Season	Team	League	GP	G	A	Pts	PIM	GP	G	A	Pts	PIM
1928–29	Portland Buckaroos	PCHL	6	1	0	1	0	—	—	—	—	—
1928–29	Victoria Cubs	PCHL	26	3	0	3	0	—	—	—	—	—
1929–30	Victoria Cubs	PCHL	36	5	5	10	35	—	—	—	—	—
1930–31	Boston Tigers	Can-Am	39	9	11	20	35	9	7	2	9	17
1930–31	Boston Bruins	NHL	1	0	0	0	0	—	—	—	—	—
1931–32	Boston Cubs	Can-Am	29	11	11	22	29	—	—	—	—	—
1931–32	Boston Bruins	NHL	14	0	1	1	8	—	—	—	—	—
1932–33	Philadelphia Arrows	Can-Am	44	21	27	48	38	5	2	1	3	2
1933–34	Quebec Castors	Can-Am	8	1	3	4	2	—	—	—	—	—
1933–34	Windsor Bulldogs	IHL	25	7	12	19	10	—	—	—	—	—
1933–34	Montreal Maroons	NHL	4	0	0	0	0	—	—	—	—	—
1934–35	Quebec Castors	Can-Am	48	25	33	58	28	3	0	1	1	0
1934–35	Montreal Canadiens	NHL	3	0	0	0	2	—	—	—	—	—
1935–36	Montreal Canadiens	NHL	12	0	2	2	4	—	—	—	—	—
1935–36	Boston Bruins	NHL	33	8	2	10	14	2	0	0	0	2
1936–37	New Haven Eagles	IAHL	8	1	3	4	5	—	—	—	—	—
1936–37	Montreal Canadiens	NHL	4	1	0	1	2	—	—	—	—	—
1936–37	Montreal Maroons	NHL	30	4	10	14	6	5	0	0	0	4
1937–38	Montreal Maroons	NHL	39	5	7	12	21	—	—	—	—	—
1938–39	Cleveland Barons	IAHL	54	7	28	35	26	8	1	4	5	4
1939–40	Cleveland Barons	IAHL	48	7	15	22	7	—	—	—	—	—
1940–41	Buffalo Bisons	AHL	20	3	6	9	9	—	—	—	—	—
1940–41	Minneapolis Millers	AHA	29	12	14	26	4	3	0	2	2	0
1941–42	Dallas Texans	AHA	46	16	41	57	29	—	—	—	—	—
1943–44	Edmonton Victorias	Al-Cup	—	—	—	—	—	3	0	2	2	0
NHL totals			140	18	22	40	57	7	0	0	0	6
