= 1928 Allan Cup =

Canadian senior ice hockey championship

The Allan Cup trophy

The 1928 Allan Cup was the Canadian senior ice hockey championship for the 1927–28 season. The University of Manitoba won the Allan Cup, defeating the Montreal Victorias 2–1 on series.

== History ==
In November 1926, Allan Cup trustee William Northey suggested that the trophy be withdrawn unless the teams competing for it followed the amateur code more strictly. W. A. Hewitt felt that the sole point of contention was the travel allowance given by the Canadian Amateur Hockey Association (CAHA), to teams travelling to play in Allan Cup games. The CAHA sought a new financial deal with the trustees, since it was financially dependent on the proceeds from Allan Cup gate receipts. H. Montagu Allan agreed to donate the Allan Cup outright to the CAHA, and control of the Allan Cup along with a surplus of $20,700, was formally transferred to the CAHA in a ceremony at the Château Laurier on March 26, 1928.

== Final ==
The best-of-three series was held in Ottawa at the Ottawa Auditorium.

- Montreal 2 University of Manitoba 1
- University of Manitoba 6 Montreal 3
- University of Manitoba 1 Montreal 0

University of Manitoba beat Montreal Victorias 2–1 on series.
