= 1936–37 New York Rangers season =

NHL hockey team season

1936–37 New York Rangers
- Division: 3rd American
- 1936–37 record: 19–20–9
- Home record: 9–7–8
- Road record: 10–13–1
- Goals for: 117
- Goals against: 106

Team information
- General manager: Lester Patrick
- Coach: Lester Patrick
- Captain: Bill Cook
- Arena: Madison Square Garden

Team leaders
- Goals: Butch Keeling (22)
- Assists: Neil Colville (18)
- Points: Cecil Dillon (31)
- Penalty minutes: Joe Cooper/Ott Heller (42)
- Wins: Dave Kerr (19)
- Goals against average: Dave Kerr (2.11)

The 1936–37 New York Rangers season was the franchise's 11th season. During the regular season, the Rangers posted a third-place finish in the American Division, with a 19–20–9 record. New York qualified for the Stanley Cup playoffs, where the team defeated the Toronto Maple Leafs and Montreal Maroons to reach the Stanley Cup Finals. In the Cup Finals, the Rangers lost to the Detroit Red Wings, three games to two.

== Regular season ==
On November 16, 1936, Hal Winkler made his NHL debut for the New York Rangers and gained a 1–0 shutout over the Montreal Maroons. He was the first goaltender to have a shutout in his NHL debut.

=== Final standings ===
American Division
	GP	W	L	T	GF	GA	PTS
**Detroit Red Wings**	48	25	14	9	128	102	59
**Boston Bruins**	48	23	18	7	120	110	53
**New York Rangers**	48	19	20	9	117	106	47
Chicago Black Hawks	48	14	27	7	99	131	35

Note: GP = Games Played, W = Wins, L = Losses, T = Ties, Pts = Points, GF = Goals For, GA = Goals Against
Teams that qualified for the playoffs are highlighted in bold.

=== Record vs. opponents ===
==== Vs. American Division ====
1936–37 NHL records
Team	**BOS**	**CHI**	**DET**	**NYR**	**Total**
Boston	—	5–2–1	1–7	3–2–3	**9–11–4**
Chicago	2–5–1	—	2–5–1	4–3–1	**8–13–3**
Detroit	7–1	5–2–1	—	5–1–2	**17–4–3**
N.Y. Rangers	2–3–3	3–4–1	1–5–2	—	**6–12–6**

==== Vs. Canadian Division ====
1936–37 NHL records
Team	**MTL**	**MTM**	**NYA**	**TOR**	**Total**
Boston	2–3–1	5–1	4–1–1	3–2–1	**14–7–3**
Chicago	2–4	0–6	3–1–2	1–3–2	**6–14–4**
Detroit	1–4–1	2–1–3	2–3–1	3–2–1	**8–10–6**
N.Y. Rangers	2–3–1	2–2–2	4–2	5–1	**13–8–3**

== Schedule and results ==
1936–37 regular season
November: 5–3–1 (home: 2–1–1; road: 3–2–0)

Game	November	Opponent	Score	Record
1	8	@ Detroit Red Wings	5–2	0–1–0
2	10	@ Montreal Maroons	4–1	1–1–0
3	15	New York Americans	2–1	1–2–0
4	17	@ Boston Bruins	6–1	2–2–0
5	19	Detroit Red Wings	1–0	3–2–0
6	21	@ Montreal Canadiens	3 – 1 OT	3–3–0
7	24	Toronto Maple Leafs	5–1	4–3–0
8	26	@ New York Americans	3–1	5–3–0
9	28	Boston Bruins	2 – 2 OT	5–3–1

December: 5–2–3 (home: 2–0–3; road: 3–2–0)

Game	December	Opponent	Score	Record
10	3	@ Detroit Red Wings	2–0	5–4–1
11	6	@ Chicago Black Hawks	2–1	6–4–1
12	8	Chicago Black Hawks	0 – 0 OT	6–4–2
13	12	@ Toronto Maple Leafs	5 – 3 OT	7–4–2
14	15	Montreal Maroons	2 – 2 OT	7–4–3
15	19	@ Montreal Canadiens	4 – 2 OT	7–5–3
16	20	Montreal Canadiens	5 – 3 OT	8–5–3
17	27	Chicago Black Hawks	1–0	9–5–3
18	29	@ New York Americans	5–1	10–5–3
19	31	Boston Bruins	2 – 2 OT	10–5–4

January: 4–5–2 (home: 2–2–2; road: 2–3–0)

Game	January	Opponent	Score	Record
20	3	@ Boston Bruins	3–2	10–6–4
21	5	New York Americans	7–1	11–6–4
22	9	@ Montreal Maroons	3–2	12–6–4
23	10	Montreal Maroons	5–2	12–7–4
24	14	Detroit Red Wings	2–0	12–8–4
25	19	Montreal Canadiens	1 – 1 OT	12–8–5
26	21	@ Chicago Black Hawks	2–0	12–9–5
27	23	@ Toronto Maple Leafs	4–0	12–10–5
28	24	Toronto Maple Leafs	4–2	13–10–5
29	26	@ Boston Bruins	3–0	14–10–5
30	28	Boston Bruins	1 – 1 OT	14–10–6

February: 3–5–3 (home: 2–2–1; road: 1–3–2)

Game	February	Opponent	Score	Record
31	2	Detroit Red Wings	4 – 4 OT	14–10–7
32	4	@ Detroit Red Wings	2 – 2 OT	14–10–8
33	6	@ Montreal Maroons	1 – 1 OT	14–10–9
34	7	Montreal Maroons	4–2	14–11–9
35	9	@ Toronto Maple Leafs	5–1	15–11–9
36	11	@ Chicago Black Hawks	5–2	15–12–9
37	14	New York Americans	5–4	15–13–9
38	16	@ Boston Bruins	3–2	15–14–9
39	18	Chicago Black Hawks	2 – 1 OT	16–14–9
40	23	Toronto Maple Leafs	2–1	17–14–9
41	28	@ Chicago Black Hawks	4–3	17–15–9

March: 2–5–0 (home: 1–3–0; road: 1–2–0)

Game	March	Opponent	Score	Record
42	4	@ Detroit Red Wings	2–1	17–16–9
43	7	Boston Bruins	1–0	17–17–9
44	9	@ New York Americans	7 – 5 OT	18–17–9
45	11	Detroit Red Wings	4–2	18–18–9
46	13	@ Montreal Canadiens	1–0	18–19–9
47	16	Chicago Black Hawks	4–3	18–20–9
48	21	Montreal Canadiens	3–1	19–20–9

Legend: Win (2 points) Loss (0 points) Tie (1 point)

== Playoffs ==
=== Stanley Cup Finals ===
The Rangers were unable to play at home after game one due to the circus.

1937 Stanley Cup playoffs
Quarterfinals vs. (C3) Toronto Maple Leafs – Rangers win 2–0

Game	Date	Visitor	Score	Home	OT	Series
1	March 23	New York Rangers	3–0	Toronto Maple Leafs		New York Rangers lead series 1–0
2	March 25	Toronto Maple Leafs	1–2	New York Rangers	OT	New York Rangers win series 2–0

Semifinals vs. (C2) Montreal Maroons – Rangers win 2–0

Game	Date	Visitor	Score	Home	OT	Series
1	April 1	Montreal Maroons	0–1	New York Rangers		New York Rangers leads series 1–0
2	April 3	New York Rangers	4–0	Montreal Maroons		New York Rangers win series 2–0

Stanley Cup Finals vs. (A1) Detroit Red Wings – Red Wings win 3–2

Game	Date	Visitor	Score	Home	OT	Series
1	April 6	Detroit Red Wings	1–5	New York Rangers		New York Rangers lead series 1–0
2	April 8	New York Rangers	2–4	Detroit Red Wings		Series tied 1–1
3	April 11	New York Rangers	1–0	Detroit Red Wings		New York Rangers lead series 2–1
4	April 13	New York Rangers	0–1	Detroit Red Wings		Series tied 2–2
5	April 15	New York Rangers	0–3	Detroit Red Wings		Detroit wins series 3–2

Legend: Win Loss

== Player statistics ==
Skaters

Regular season
Player	GP	G	A	Pts	PIM
Cecil Dillon	48	20	11	31	13
Phil Watson	48	11	17	28	22
Neil Colville	45	10	18	28	33
Melville Keeling	48	22	4	26	18
Lynn Patrick	45	8	16	24	23
Alex Shibicky	47	14	8	22	30
Frank Boucher	44	7	13	20	5
Mac Colville	46	7	12	19	10
Ehrhardt Heller	48	5	12	17	42
Walter Pratt	47	8	7	15	23
Murray Murdoch	48	0	14	14	16
Arthur Coulter	47	1	5	6	27
Bill Cook	21	1	4	5	6
Joe Cooper	48	0	3	3	42
Eddie Wares	2	2	0	2	0
Clint Smith	2	1	0	1	0
Bryan Hextall	3	0	1	1	0
Joe Krol	1	0	0	0	0
Ivan Johnson	34	0	0	0	2

Playoffs
Player	GP	G	A	Pts	PIM
Neil Colville	9	3	3	6	0
Frank Boucher	9	2	3	5	0
Alex Shibicky	9	1	4	5	0
Melville Keeling	9	3	2	5	2
Walter Pratt	9	3	1	4	11
Arthur Coulter	9	0	3	3	15
Mac Colville	9	1	2	3	2
Lynn Patrick	9	3	0	3	2
Cecil Dillon	9	0	3	3	0
Joe Cooper	9	1	1	2	12
Murray Murdoch	9	1	1	2	0
Phil Watson	9	0	2	2	9
Ivan Johnson	9	0	1	1	4
Ehrhardt Heller	9	0	0	0	11

Goaltenders

Regular season
Player	GP	TOI	W	L	T	GA	GAA	SO
Dave Kerr	48	3020	19	20	9	106	2.11	4

Playoffs
Player	GP	TOI	W	L	GA	GAA	SO
Dave Kerr	9	553	6	3	10	1.08	4

^{†}Denotes player spent time with another team before joining Rangers. Stats reflect time with Rangers only.
^{‡}Traded mid-season. Stats reflect time with Rangers only.

Note:

Pos = Position;GP = Games played; G = Goals; A = Assists; Pts = Points; PIM = Penalty minutes; +/- = Plus/minus; PPG = Power-play goals; SHG = Short-handed goals; GWG = Game-winning goals
Pos = Position;GP = Games played; Min, TOI = Minutes played; W = Wins; L = Losses; T,T/OT = Ties; OTL = Overtime losses; GA = Goals-against; GAA = Goals-against average; SO = Shutouts; SA = Shots against; SV = Shots saved;SV% = Save percentage;

== See also ==
- 1936–37 NHL season
