= 1936–37 Chicago Black Hawks season =

NHL ice hockey team season

1936–37 Chicago Black Hawks
- Division: 4th American
- 1936–37 record: 14–27–7
- Home record: 8–13–3
- Road record: 6–14–4
- Goals for: 99
- Goals against: 131

Team information
- General manager: Frederic McLaughlin
- Coach: Clem Loughlin
- Captain: Johnny Gottselig
- Arena: Chicago Stadium

Team leaders
- Goals: Paul Thompson (17)
- Assists: Johnny Gottselig (21)
- Points: Paul Thompson (35)
- Penalty minutes: Earl Seibert (46)
- Wins: Mike Karakas (14)
- Goals against average: Mike Karakas (2.64)

The 1936–37 Chicago Black Hawks season was the team's 11th season in the NHL, and they were coming off a quick playoff exit, as the Hawks lost to the underdog New York Americans in the 1st round of the 1936 playoffs. The Black Hawks would then have their worst season since 1928–29, as the team finished with only 35 points with a 14–27–7 record, and missed the playoffs for the first time since 1932–33. Chicago scored an NHL low 99 goals, and gave up 131 goals, the 2nd highest total in the league.

Paul Thompson would lead the Hawks offensively, scoring a club high in goals (17) and points (35). Team captain Johnny Gottselig had a team high 21 assists. Pep Kelly, who the Hawks acquired in a trade with the Toronto Maple Leafs midway through the season, scored 13 goals in 29 games with Chicago after scoring only 2 goals in 16 games with the Leafs. Defenseman Earl Seibert led all defensemen with 9 goals and 15 points, and had a team high 46 penalty minutes.

In goal, Mike Karakas would get all the action, winning 14 games, earning 5 shutouts, and posting a 2.64 GAA.

The Black Hawks would fail to qualify for the playoffs for the first time since 1933, as they finished in the cellar of the American Division, 12 points behind the 3rd place New York Rangers.

== Season standings ==
American Division
	GP	W	L	T	GF	GA	PTS
**Detroit Red Wings**	48	25	14	9	128	102	59
**Boston Bruins**	48	23	18	7	120	110	53
**New York Rangers**	48	19	20	9	117	106	47
Chicago Black Hawks	48	14	27	7	99	131	35

Note: GP = Games Played, W = Wins, L = Losses, T = Ties, Pts = Points, GF = Goals For, GA = Goals Against
Teams that qualified for the playoffs are highlighted in bold.

=== Record vs. opponents ===
==== Vs. American Division ====
1936–37 NHL records
Team	**BOS**	**CHI**	**DET**	**NYR**	**Total**
Boston	—	5–2–1	1–7	3–2–3	**9–11–4**
Chicago	2–5–1	—	2–5–1	4–3–1	**8–13–3**
Detroit	7–1	5–2–1	—	5–1–2	**17–4–3**
N.Y. Rangers	2–3–3	3–4–1	1–5–2	—	**6–12–6**

==== Vs. Canadian Division ====
1936–37 NHL records
Team	**MTL**	**MTM**	**NYA**	**TOR**	**Total**
Boston	2–3–1	5–1	4–1–1	3–2–1	**14–7–3**
Chicago	2–4	0–6	3–1–2	1–3–2	**6–14–4**
Detroit	1–4–1	2–1–3	2–3–1	3–2–1	**8–10–6**
N.Y. Rangers	2–3–1	2–2–2	4–2	5–1	**13–8–3**

== Schedule and results ==
1936–37 regular season
November

Game	Date	Visitor	Score	Home	Record	Points
1	November 5	New York Americans	1–1	Chicago Black Hawks	0–0–1	1
2	November 12	Chicago Black Hawks	0–0	New York Americans	0–0–2	2
3	November 14	Chicago Black Hawks	2–6	Toronto Maple Leafs	0–1–2	2
4	November 15	Toronto Maple Leafs	1–1	Chicago Black Hawks	0–1–3	3
5	November 19	Montreal Maroons	4–0	Chicago Black Hawks	0–2–3	3
6	November 22	Boston Bruins	2–1	Chicago Black Hawks	0–3–3	3
7	November 24	Chicago Black Hawks	1–1	Boston Bruins	0–3–4	4
8	November 26	Chicago Black Hawks	2–0	Detroit Red Wings	1–3–4	6
9	November 29	Montreal Canadiens	2–1	Chicago Black Hawks	1–4–4	6

December

Game	Date	Visitor	Score	Home	Record	Points
10	December 6	New York Rangers	2–1	Chicago Black Hawks	1–5–4	6
11	December 8	Chicago Black Hawks	0–0	New York Rangers	1–5–5	7
12	December 10	Chicago Black Hawks	1–2	Montreal Maroons	1–6–5	7
13	December 13	Detroit Red Wings	2–1	Chicago Black Hawks	1–7–5	7
14	December 20	New York Americans	1–2	Chicago Black Hawks	2–7–5	9
15	December 22	Chicago Black Hawks	1–4	Montreal Canadiens	2–8–5	9
16	December 25	Chicago Black Hawks	1–1	Detroit Red Wings	2–8–6	10
17	December 27	Chicago Black Hawks	0–1	New York Rangers	2–9–6	10
18	December 29	Montreal Canadiens	1–5	Chicago Black Hawks	3–9–6	12

January

Game	Date	Visitor	Score	Home	Record	Points
19	January 1	Detroit Red Wings	2–4	Chicago Black Hawks	4–9–6	14
20	January 3	Montreal Maroons	3–1	Chicago Black Hawks	4–10–6	14
21	January 7	Boston Bruins	2–0	Chicago Black Hawks	4–11–6	14
22	January 10	Toronto Maple Leafs	1–2	Chicago Black Hawks	5–11–6	16
23	January 12	Chicago Black Hawks	4–2	Boston Bruins	6–11–6	18
24	January 14	Chicago Black Hawks	3–7	Montreal Maroons	6–12–6	18
25	January 16	Chicago Black Hawks	2–3	Toronto Maple Leafs	6–13–6	18
26	January 17	Detroit Red Wings	2–0	Chicago Black Hawks	6–14–6	18
27	January 19	Chicago Black Hawks	2–7	Detroit Red Wings	6–15–6	18
28	January 21	New York Rangers	0–2	Chicago Black Hawks	7–15–6	20
29	January 24	Montreal Canadiens	4–1	Chicago Black Hawks	7–16–6	20
30	January 26	Chicago Black Hawks	9–0	New York Americans	8–16–6	22
31	January 28	Chicago Black Hawks	5–6	Montreal Canadiens	8–17–6	22
32	January 31	Montreal Maroons	2–1	Chicago Black Hawks	8–18–6	22

February

Game	Date	Visitor	Score	Home	Record	Points
33	February 7	New York Americans	1–5	Chicago Black Hawks	9–18–6	24
34	February 11	New York Rangers	2–5	Chicago Black Hawks	10–18–6	26
35	February 14	Boston Bruins	2–1	Chicago Black Hawks	10–19–6	26
36	February 18	Chicago Black Hawks	1–2	New York Rangers	10–20–6	26
37	February 20	Chicago Black Hawks	1–6	Montreal Maroons	10–21–6	26
38	February 21	Chicago Black Hawks	0–6	Detroit Red Wings	10–22–6	26
39	February 25	Detroit Red Wings	3–1	Chicago Black Hawks	10–23–6	26
40	February 28	New York Rangers	3–4	Chicago Black Hawks	11–23–6	28

March

Game	Date	Visitor	Score	Home	Record	Points
41	March 2	Chicago Black Hawks	4–2	Boston Bruins	12–23–6	30
42	March 4	Chicago Black Hawks	5–3	Montreal Canadiens	13–23–6	32
43	March 7	Toronto Maple Leafs	2–2	Chicago Black Hawks	13–23–7	33
44	March 11	Boston Bruins	6–2	Chicago Black Hawks	13–24–7	33
45	March 13	Chicago Black Hawks	2–3	Toronto Maple Leafs	13–25–7	33
46	March 16	Chicago Black Hawks	4–3	New York Rangers	14–25–7	35
47	March 18	Chicago Black Hawks	4–9	New York Americans	14–26–7	35
48	March 21	Chicago Black Hawks	1–6	Boston Bruins	14–27–7	35

Legend: Win (2 points) Loss (0 points) Tie (1 point)

== Player statistics ==
=== Scoring leaders ===
Player	GP	G	A	Pts	PIM
Paul Thompson	47	17	18	35	28
Johnny Gottselig	47	9	21	30	10
Wildor Larochelle	43	9	10	19	6
Louis Trudel	42	6	12	18	11
Doc Romnes	28	4	14	18	2

=== Goaltending ===
Player	GP	TOI	W	L	T	GA	SO	GAA
Mike Karakas	48	2978	14	27	7	131	5	2.64

== See also ==
- 1936–37 NHL season
