= 1935–36 New York Americans season =

National Hockey League team season

1935–36 New York Americans
- Division: 3rd Canadian
- 1935–36 record: 16–25–7
- Home record: 10–11–3
- Road record: 6–14–4
- Goals for: 109
- Goals against: 122

Team information
- Coach: Rosie Helmer
- Captain: Red Dutton
- Arena: Madison Square Garden

Team leaders
- Goals: Sweeney Schriner (19)
- Assists: Art Chapman (28)
- Points: Sweeney Schriner (45)
- Penalty minutes: Mervyn Dutton (69)
- Wins: Roy Worters (16)
- Goals against average: Roy Worters (2.44)

The 1935–36 New York Americans season was the Americans' 11th season of play. Under coach Rosie Helmer, the team improved to third place in the Canadian Division and qualified for the playoffs, for only the second time in the team's history. The club won its quarter-final series against the Chicago Black Hawks, before losing in the semi-final to the Toronto Maple Leafs.

== Regular season ==
=== Final standings ===
Canadian Division
	GP	W	L	T	GF	GA	PTS
**Montreal Maroons**	48	22	16	10	114	106	54
**Toronto Maple Leafs**	48	23	19	6	126	106	52
**New York Americans**	48	16	25	7	109	122	39
Montreal Canadiens	48	11	26	11	82	123	33

Note: W = Wins, L = Losses, T = Ties, GF = Goals For, GA = Goals Against, Pts = Points
Teams that qualified for the playoffs are highlighted in bold.

=== Record vs. opponents ===
==== Vs. Canadian Division ====
1935–36 NHL records
Team	**MTL**	**MTM**	**NYA**	**TOR**	**Total**
M. Canadiens	—	1–6–1	5–3	2–6	**8–15–1**
M. Maroons	6–1–1	—	4–1–3	5–2–1	**15–4–5**
N.Y. Americans	3–5	1–4–3	—	4–3–1	**8–12–4**
Toronto	6–2	2–5–1	3–4–1	—	**11–11–2**

==== Vs. American Division ====
1935–36 NHL records
Team	**BOS**	**CHI**	**DET**	**NYR**	**Total**
M. Canadiens	1–3–2	1–2–3	0–4–2	1–2–3	**3–11–10**
M. Maroons	1–4–1	3–2–1	3–2–1	0–4–2	**7–12–5**
N.Y. Americans	2–4	3–2–1	1–4–1	2–3–1	**8–13–3**
Toronto	3–1–2	3–3	3–3	3–1–2	**12–8–4**

== Schedule and results ==
1935–36 regular season
November

Game	Result	Date	Score	Opponent	Record
1	L	November 7, 1935	1–3	@ Chicago Black Hawks (1935–36)	0–1–0
2	T	November 9, 1935	5–5 OT	@ Toronto Maple Leafs (1935–36)	0–1–1
3	L	November 17, 1935	0–6	Montreal Canadiens (1935–36)	0–2–1
4	L	November 19, 1935	0–1	@ Boston Bruins (1935–36)	0–3–1
5	W	November 21, 1935	3–1	Detroit Red Wings (1935–36)	1–3–1
6	L	November 23, 1935	1–2	@ Montreal Canadiens (1935–36)	1–4–1
7	L	November 26, 1935	0–1	New York Rangers (1935–36)	1–5–1
8	W	November 30, 1935	2–1	Boston Bruins (1935–36)	2–5–1

December

Game	Result	Date	Score	Opponent	Record
9	W	December 5, 1935	2–1	@ Montreal Maroons (1935–36)	3–5–1
10	T	December 8, 1935	1–1 OT	@ Detroit Red Wings (1935–36)	3–5–2
11	W	December 10, 1935	4–2	Toronto Maple Leafs (1935–36)	4–5–2
12	L	December 12, 1935	2–5 OT	@ New York Rangers (1935–36)	4–6–2
13	W	December 15, 1935	3–0	Chicago Black Hawks (1935–36)	5–6–2
14	L	December 19, 1935	1–3	Detroit Red Wings (1935–36)	5–7–2
15	L	December 21, 1935	3–5	@ Toronto Maple Leafs (1935–36)	5–8–2
16	W	December 22, 1935	3–2 OT	@ Chicago Black Hawks (1935–36)	6–8–2
17	L	December 26, 1935	1–2	Montreal Maroons (1935–36)	6–9–2
18	W	December 29, 1935	5–1	Montreal Canadiens (1935–36)	7–9–2

January

Game	Result	Date	Score	Opponent	Record
19	W	January 2, 1936	6–3	@ New York Rangers (1935–36)	8–9–2
20	T	January 5, 1936	0–0 OT	New York Rangers (1935–36)	8–9–3
21	L	January 9, 1936	1–4	Chicago Black Hawks (1935–36)	8–10–3
22	L	January 11, 1936	2–3	@ Montreal Maroons (1935–36)	8–11–3
23	L	January 14, 1936	0–1	Montreal Canadiens (1935–36)	8–12–3
24	W	January 16, 1936	8–3	@ Montreal Canadiens (1935–36)	9–12–3
25	L	January 19, 1936	1–2	Montreal Maroons (1935–36)	9–13–3
26	W	January 23, 1936	3–2 OT	Toronto Maple Leafs (1935–36)	10–13–3
27	L	January 26, 1936	1–2	Boston Bruins (1935–36)	10–14–3
28	L	January 30, 1936	2–3	Montreal Maroons (1935–36)	10–15–3

February

Game	Result	Date	Score	Opponent	Record
29	L	February 2, 1936	1–2 OT	@ Boston Bruins (1935–36)	10–16–3
30	T	February 4, 1936	1–1 OT	@ Montreal Maroons (1935–36)	10–16–4
31	W	February 6, 1936	4–3	Toronto Maple Leafs (1935–36)	11–16–4
32	L	February 8, 1936	0–3	@ Toronto Maple Leafs (1935–36)	11–17–4
33	W	February 9, 1936	4–1	@ Chicago Black Hawks (1935–36)	12–17–4
34	T	February 13, 1936	2–2 OT	Chicago Black Hawks (1935–36)	12–17–5
35	T	February 15, 1936	4–4 OT	@ Montreal Maroons (1935–36)	12–17–6
36	T	February 19, 1936	8–8 OT	Montreal Maroons (1935–36)	12–17–7
37	L	February 22, 1936	0–1	@ Montreal Canadiens (1935–36)	12–18–7
38	L	February 23, 1936	3–4	@ Detroit Red Wings (1935–36)	12–19–7
39	L	February 25, 1936	2–3	@ Boston Bruins (1935–36)	12–20–7

March

Game	Result	Date	Score	Opponent	Record
40	W	March 1, 1936	5–2	Boston Bruins (1935–36)	13–20–7
41	L	March 3, 1936	1–3	@ Montreal Canadiens (1935–36)	13–21–7
42	L	March 5, 1936	1–4	Detroit Red Wings (1935–36)	13–22–7
43	W	March 8, 1936	1–0	@ New York Rangers (1935–36)	14–22–7
44	W	March 10, 1936	3–2	Toronto Maple Leafs (1935–36)	15–22–7
45	L	March 15, 1936	1–2	New York Rangers (1935–36)	15–23–7
46	W	March 19, 1936	4–1	Montreal Canadiens (1935–36)	16–23–7
47	L	March 21, 1936	1–4	@ Toronto Maple Leafs (1935–36)	16–24–7
48	L	March 22, 1936	2–7	@ Detroit Red Wings (1935–36)	16–25–7

Legend: Win (2 points) Loss (0 points) Tie (1 point)

== Playoffs ==
The Americans made it into the playoffs for the second time in history. They defeated Chicago 7 goals to 5, or 7–5. They went against Toronto in the second round in a best of three series and lost in 3 games, or 1–2.

== Player statistics ==
=== Regular season ===
Scoring

Player	GP	G	A	Pts	PIM
Sweeney Schriner	48	19	26	45	8
Art Chapman	48	10	28	38	14
Nels Stewart	48	14	15	29	16
Eddie Wiseman	44	12	16	28	15
Harry Oliver	45	9	16	25	12
Joe Jerwa	47	9	12	21	65
Lorne Carr	44	8	10	18	4
Baldy Cotton	45	7	9	16	27
Red Dutton	46	5	8	13	69
Lloyd Klein	42	4	8	12	14
Carl Voss	46	3	9	12	10
John Doran	25	4	2	6	44
Hap Emms	32	1	5	6	12
Tommy Anderson	24	3	2	5	20
Allan Murray	48	1	0	1	33
Bill Brydge	21	0	0	0	27
Tony Hemmerling	3	0	0	0	0
Fred Hergerts	1	0	0	0	0
Walter Kalbfleisch	4	0	0	0	2
Roy Worters	48	0	0	0	0

Goaltending

Player	MIN	GP	W	L	T	GA	GAA	SA	SV	SV%	SO
Roy Worters	3000	48	16	25	7	122	2.44				3
Team:	3000	48	16	25	7	122	2.44				3

=== Playoffs ===
Scoring

Player	GP	G	A	Pts	PIM
Joe Jerwa	5	2	3	5	2
Sweeney Schriner	5	3	1	4	2
Eddie Wiseman	4	2	1	3	0
Harry Oliver	5	1	2	3	0
Nels Stewart	5	1	2	3	4
Art Chapman	5	0	3	3	0
Lorne Carr	5	1	1	2	0
Baldy Cotton	5	0	1	1	9
Tommy Anderson	5	0	0	0	6
John Doran	3	0	0	0	0
Red Dutton	3	0	0	0	0
Walter Kalbfleisch	5	0	0	0	2
Lloyd Klein	5	0	0	0	2
Allan Murray	5	0	0	0	2
Carl Voss	5	0	0	0	0
Roy Worters	5	0	0	0	0

Goaltending

Player	MIN	GP	W	L	T	GA	GAA	SA	SV	SV%	SO
Roy Worters	300	5	2	3	0	11	2.20				2
Team:	300	5	2	3	0	11	2.20				2

== See also ==
- 1935–36 NHL season
