= 1935–36 Montreal Canadiens season =

NHL hockey team season

1935–36 Montreal Canadiens
- Division: 4th Canadian
- 1935–36 record: 11–26–11
- Home record: 5–11–8
- Road record: 6–15–3
- Goals for: 82
- Goals against: 123

Team information
- General manager: Ernest Savard
- Coach: Sylvio Mantha
- Captain: Sylvio Mantha
- Arena: Montreal Forum

Team leaders
- Goals: Leroy Goldsworthy; Aurele Joliat (15)
- Assists: Paul Haynes (19)
- Points: Leroy Goldsworthy (26)
- Penalty minutes: Johnny Gagnon (42)
- Wins: Wilf Cude (11)
- Goals against average: Wilf Cude (2.49)

The 1935–36 Montreal Canadiens season was the team's 27th season of play. The Canadiens slipped to last place in the Canadian division and did not qualify for the playoffs for the first time since the 1925–26 season.

== Regular season ==
This was a season of numerous changes. Leo Dandurand sold his share of the team and gave up the general manager and coach positions. Ernest Savard became general manager and Sylvio Mantha was made playing coach for the season. Johnny Gagnon returned to the club from Boston. Hector Blake made his debut for the Canadiens. Nels Crutchfield had to retire after an auto accident, and a benefit game was held for him in January 1936. Wildor Larochelle was traded to Chicago.

=== Final standings ===
Canadian Division
	GP	W	L	T	GF	GA	PTS
**Montreal Maroons**	48	22	16	10	114	106	54
**Toronto Maple Leafs**	48	23	19	6	126	106	52
**New York Americans**	48	16	25	7	109	122	39
Montreal Canadiens	48	11	26	11	82	123	33

Note: W = Wins, L = Losses, T = Ties, GF = Goals For, GA = Goals Against, Pts = Points
Teams that qualified for the playoffs are highlighted in bold.

=== Record vs. opponents ===
==== Vs. Canadian Division ====
1935–36 NHL records
Team	**MTL**	**MTM**	**NYA**	**TOR**	**Total**
M. Canadiens	—	1–6–1	5–3	2–6	**8–15–1**
M. Maroons	6–1–1	—	4–1–3	5–2–1	**15–4–5**
N.Y. Americans	3–5	1–4–3	—	4–3–1	**8–12–4**
Toronto	6–2	2–5–1	3–4–1	—	**11–11–2**

==== Vs. American Division ====
1935–36 NHL records
Team	**BOS**	**CHI**	**DET**	**NYR**	**Total**
M. Canadiens	1–3–2	1–2–3	0–4–2	1–2–3	**3–11–10**
M. Maroons	1–4–1	3–2–1	3–2–1	0–4–2	**7–12–5**
N.Y. Americans	2–4	3–2–1	1–4–1	2–3–1	**8–13–3**
Toronto	3–1–2	3–3	3–3	3–1–2	**12–8–4**

== Schedule and results ==
1935–36 regular season
November

Game	Result	Date	Score	Opponent	Record
1	L	November 12, 1935	1–2 OT	New York Rangers (1935–36)	0–1–0
2	W	November 17, 1935	6–0	@ New York Americans (1935–36)	1–1–0
3	L	November 19, 1935	2–7	Toronto Maple Leafs (1935–36)	1–2–0
4	W	November 21, 1935	2–1	@ Montreal Maroons (1935–36)	2–2–0
5	W	November 23, 1935	2–1	New York Americans (1935–36)	3–2–0
6	T	November 28, 1935	0–0 OT	@ Detroit Red Wings (1935–36)	3–2–1
7	L	November 30, 1935	3–8	@ Toronto Maple Leafs (1935–36)	3–3–1

December

Game	Result	Date	Score	Opponent	Record
8	L	December 1, 1935	0–1	@ Chicago Black Hawks (1935–36)	3–4–1
9	L	December 3, 1935	2–3	Montreal Maroons (1935–36)	3–5–1
10	L	December 7, 1935	2–3	Detroit Red Wings (1935–36)	3–6–1
11	T	December 12, 1935	1–1 OT	Boston Bruins (1935–36)	3–6–2
12	L	December 15, 1935	1–2	@ Boston Bruins (1935–36)	3–7–2
13	T	December 17, 1935	1–1 OT	@ New York Rangers (1935–36)	3–7–3
14	T	December 19, 1935	2–2 OT	Chicago Black Hawks (1935–36)	3–7–4
15	L	December 21, 1935	1–2	Montreal Maroons (1935–36)	3–8–4
16	L	December 26, 1935	0–2	Toronto Maple Leafs (1935–36)	3–9–4
17	L	December 29, 1935	1–5	@ New York Americans (1935–36)	3–10–4

January

Game	Result	Date	Score	Opponent	Record
18	W	January 1, 1936	2–0	@ Boston Bruins (1935–36)	4–10–4
19	T	January 4, 1936	1–1 OT	Boston Bruins (1935–36)	4–10–5
20	L	January 5, 1936	2–5	@ Detroit Red Wings (1935–36)	4–11–5
21	T	January 9, 1936	1–1 OT	Montreal Maroons (1935–36)	4–11–6
22	W	January 11, 1936	7–3	@ Toronto Maple Leafs (1935–36)	5–11–6
23	W	January 12, 1936	2–1	@ Chicago Black Hawks (1935–36)	6–11–6
24	W	January 14, 1936	1–0	@ New York Americans (1935–36)	7–11–6
25	L	January 16, 1936	3–8	New York Americans (1935–36)	7–12–6
26	W	January 18, 1936	3–1	New York Rangers (1935–36)	8–12–6
27	T	January 23, 1936	1–1 OT	Chicago Black Hawks (1935–36)	8–12–7
28	L	January 25, 1936	1–4	@ Montreal Maroons (1935–36)	8–13–7
29	L	January 28, 1936	2–3 OT	@ New York Rangers (1935–36)	8–14–7
30	W	January 30, 1936	3–0	Toronto Maple Leafs (1935–36)	9–14–7

February

Game	Result	Date	Score	Opponent	Record
31	L	February 1, 1936	1–3	Detroit Red Wings (1935–36)	9–15–7
32	L	February 6, 1936	3–4	Boston Bruins (1935–36)	9–16–7
33	L	February 8, 1936	2–7	@ Montreal Maroons (1935–36)	9–17–7
34	T	February 11, 1936	1–1 OT	New York Rangers (1935–36)	9–17–8
35	T	February 16, 1936	1–1 OT	@ New York Rangers (1935–36)	9–17–9
36	T	February 18, 1936	3–3 OT	Chicago Black Hawks (1935–36)	9–17–10
37	L	February 20, 1936	1–2	@ Toronto Maple Leafs (1935–36)	9–18–10
38	W	February 22, 1936	1–0	New York Americans (1935–36)	10–18–10
39	L	February 29, 1936	2–4	Montreal Maroons (1935–36)	10–19–10

March

Game	Result	Date	Score	Opponent	Record
40	L	March 1, 1936	1–3	@ Detroit Red Wings (1935–36)	10–20–10
41	W	March 3, 1936	3–1	New York Americans (1935–36)	11–20–10
42	L	March 7, 1936	1–8	@ Toronto Maple Leafs (1935–36)	11–21–10
43	L	March 8, 1936	0–2	@ Chicago Black Hawks (1935–36)	11–22–10
44	L	March 12, 1936	3–6	Toronto Maple Leafs (1935–36)	11–23–10
45	T	March 14, 1936	1–1 OT	Detroit Red Wings (1935–36)	11–23–11
46	L	March 15, 1936	1–3	@ Montreal Maroons (1935–36)	11–24–11
47	L	March 17, 1936	0–1	@ Boston Bruins (1935–36)	11–25–11
48	L	March 19, 1936	1–4	@ New York Americans (1935–36)	11–26–11

Legend: Win (2 points) Loss (0 points) Tie (1 point)

== Player statistics ==
=== Regular season ===
==== Scoring ====
Player	Pos	GP	G	A	Pts	PIM
Leroy Goldsworthy	RW	47	15	11	26	8
Paul Haynes	C	48	5	19	24	24
Aurel Joliat	LW	48	15	8	23	16
Jack McGill	LW	46	13	7	20	28
Armand Mondou	LW	36	7	11	18	10
Johnny Gagnon	RW	48	7	9	16	42
Pit Lepine	C	32	6	10	16	4
Joffre Desilets	RW	38	7	6	13	0
Georges Mantha	D/LW	35	1	12	13	14
Polly Drouin	LW	30	1	8	9	19
Sylvio Mantha	D	42	2	4	6	25
Toe Blake	LW	11	1	2	3	28
Bill Miller	C/D	17	1	2	3	2
Walt Buswell	D	44	0	2	2	34
Irv Frew	D	18	0	2	2	16
Wildor Larochelle	RW	13	0	2	2	6
Jean Pusie	D	31	0	2	2	11
Paul Runge	C/LW	12	0	2	2	4
Art Lesieur	D	38	1	0	1	24
Jean Bourcier	LW	9	0	1	1	0
Rosie Couture	RW	10	0	1	1	0
Max Bennett	RW	1	0	0	0	0
Conrad Bourcier	C	6	0	0	0	0
Abbie Cox	G	1	0	0	0	0
Wilf Cude	G	47	0	0	0	0
Red Goupille	D	4	0	0	0	0
Gaston Leroux	D	2	0	0	0	0
Rod Lorrain	RW	1	0	0	0	2

==== Goaltending ====
Player	MIN	GP	W	L	T	GA	GAA	SO
Wilf Cude	2940	47	11	26	10	122	2.49	6
Abbie Cox	70	1	0	0	1	1	0.86	0
Team:	3010	48	11	26	11	123	2.45	6

Note:

Pos = Position;GP = Games played; G = Goals; A = Assists; Pts = Points; PIM = Penalty minutes; +/- = Plus/minus; PPG = Power-play goals; SHG = Short-handed goals; GWG = Game-winning goals
Pos = Position;GP = Games played; Min, TOI = Minutes played; W = Wins; L = Losses; T,T/OT = Ties; OTL = Overtime losses; GA = Goals-against; GAA = Goals-against average; SO = Shutouts; SA = Shots against; SV = Shots saved;SV% = Save percentage;

== Awards and records ==
- Wilf Cude – NHL First All-Star team

== See also ==
- 1935–36 NHL season
