= 1935–36 NHL transactions =

The following is a list of all team-to-team transactions that have occurred in the National Hockey League (NHL) during the 1935–36 NHL season. It lists which team each player has been traded to and for which player(s) or other consideration(s), if applicable.

== Transactions ==
July 11, 1935	To Boston Bruins Walt Buswell; Cooney Weiland	To Detroit Red Wings Marty Barry; Art Giroux
July 13, 1935	To Boston Bruins Roger Jenkins	To Montreal Canadiens Walt Buswell; Jean Pusie cash
September 28, 1935	To Boston Bruins cash	To New York Americans Joe Jerwa; Nels Stewart
September 29, 1935	To Toronto Maple Leafs $7,000 cash future considerations	To Detroit Red Wings Hec Kilrea
September 30, 1935	To Boston Bruins Jack Riley	To Montreal Canadiens Paul Haynes
October 9, 1935	To Toronto Maple Leafs cash	To New York Americans Baldy Cotton
October 11, 1935	To New York Americans Tommy Anderson	To Detroit Red Wings cash
October 16, 1935	To Montreal Maroons Bill Beveridge	To Montreal Canadiens cash
October 16, 1935	To New York Americans Carl Voss	To Detroit Red Wings Pete Kelly
October 26, 1935	To Montreal Maroons $10,000 cash	To New York Rangers Sammy McManus
October 30, 1935	To Montreal Maroons rights to George Brown	To New York Rangers Eddie Wares
November 21, 1935	To New York Americans Ed Wiseman	To Detroit Red Wings Fred Hergerts $7,500 cash
December 19, 1935	To Boston Bruins Ed Finnigan	To New York Americans cash
December 21, 1935	To Montreal Canadiens cash	To Chicago Black Hawks Wildor Larochelle
December 24, 1935	To Boston Bruins cash	To Montreal Canadiens Paul Runge
December 28, 1935	To Boston Bruins Ray Getliffe	To New York Rangers cash
December 29, 1935	To Boston Bruins Lorne Duguid	To Detroit Red Wings Gene Carrigan
January 15, 1936	To Chicago Black Hawks Earl Seibert	To New York Rangers Art Coulter
January 15, 1936	To Toronto Maple Leafs $16,000 cash	To Boston Bruins William Hollett
January 26, 1936	To Chicago Black Hawks Glenn Brydson	To New York Rangers Howie Morenz
February 8, 1936	To Montreal Maroons Lorne Chabot	To Montreal Canadiens Toe Blake; Bill Miller rights to Ken Grivel
