= 1935–36 Montreal Maroons season =

National Hockey League team season

1935–36 Montreal Maroons
- Division: 1st Canadian
- 1935–36 record: 22–16–10
- Home record: 13–8–3
- Road record: 9–8–7
- Goals for: 114
- Goals against: 88

Team information
- Coach: Tommy Gorman
- Captain: Hooley Smith
- Arena: Montreal Forum

Team leaders
- Goals: Hooley Smith (19)
- Assists: Baldy Northcott (21)
- Points: Hooley Smith (38)
- Penalty minutes: Allan Shields (81)
- Wins: Bill Beveridge (14)
- Goals against average: Bill Beveridge (22)

The 1935–36 Montreal Maroons season involved participating in the longest playoff game in NHL history.

== Regular season ==
=== Final standings ===
Canadian Division
| | GP | W | L | T | GF | GA | PTS |
|---|---|---|---|---|---|---|---|
| **Montreal Maroons** | 48 | 22 | 16 | 10 | 114 | 106 | 54 |
| **Toronto Maple Leafs** | 48 | 23 | 19 | 6 | 126 | 106 | 52 |
| **New York Americans** | 48 | 16 | 25 | 7 | 109 | 122 | 39 |
| Montreal Canadiens | 48 | 11 | 26 | 11 | 82 | 123 | 33 |

Note: W = Wins, L = Losses, T = Ties, GF = Goals For, GA = Goals Against, Pts = Points
Teams that qualified for the playoffs are highlighted in bold.

=== Record vs. opponents ===
==== Vs. Canadian Division ====
1935–36 NHL records
| Team | **MTL** | **MTM** | **NYA** | **TOR** | **Total** |
|---|---|---|---|---|---|
| M. Canadiens | — | 1–6–1 | 5–3 | 2–6 | **8–15–1** |
| M. Maroons | 6–1–1 | — | 4–1–3 | 5–2–1 | **15–4–5** |
| N.Y. Americans | 3–5 | 1–4–3 | — | 4–3–1 | **8–12–4** |
| Toronto | 6–2 | 2–5–1 | 3–4–1 | — | **11–11–2** |

==== Vs. American Division ====
1935–36 NHL records
| Team | **BOS** | **CHI** | **DET** | **NYR** | **Total** |
|---|---|---|---|---|---|
| M. Canadiens | 1–3–2 | 1–2–3 | 0–4–2 | 1–2–3 | **3–11–10** |
| M. Maroons | 1–4–1 | 3–2–1 | 3–2–1 | 0–4–2 | **7–12–5** |
| N.Y. Americans | 2–4 | 3–2–1 | 1–4–1 | 2–3–1 | **8–13–3** |
| Toronto | 3–1–2 | 3–3 | 3–3 | 3–1–2 | **12–8–4** |

== Playoffs ==
In one of the most evenly matched series, the first game of the Maroons-Red Wings series set a record for the longest game in Stanley Cup playoff history. The game began at 8:30 p.m. at the Forum in Montreal, and ended at 2:25 a.m. The game was scoreless until in the sixth overtime, when Mud Bruneteau scored on Maroon goaltender Lorne Chabot to win the game. Normie Smith shut out the Maroons in the next game, and the Red Wings then beat the Maroons to win the series.

== Schedule and results ==
1935–36 regular season
November

| Game | Result | Date | Score | Opponent | Record |
|---|---|---|---|---|---|
| 1 | W | November 16, 1935 | 1–0 | Boston Bruins (1935–36) | 1–0–0 |
| 2 | L | November 21, 1935 | 1–2 | Montreal Canadiens (1935–36) | 1–1–0 |
| 3 | W | November 23, 1935 | 5–2 | @ Toronto Maple Leafs (1935–36) | 2–1–0 |
| 4 | L | November 24, 1935 | 1–2 | @ Chicago Black Hawks (1935–36) | 2–2–0 |
| 5 | W | November 26, 1935 | 4–1 | Chicago Black Hawks (1935–36) | 3–2–0 |
| 6 | W | November 30, 1935 | 3–2 | Detroit Red Wings (1935–36) | 4–2–0 |

December

| Game | Result | Date | Score | Opponent | Record |
|---|---|---|---|---|---|
| 7 | W | December 3, 1935 | 3–2 | @ Montreal Canadiens (1935–36) | 5–2–0 |
| 8 | L | December 5, 1935 | 1–2 | New York Americans (1935–36) | 5–3–0 |
| 9 | T | December 8, 1935 | 3–3 OT | @ New York Rangers (1935–36) | 5–3–1 |
| 10 | L | December 10, 1935 | 0–2 | @ Boston Bruins (1935–36) | 5–4–1 |
| 11 | L | December 14, 1935 | 2–6 | New York Rangers (1935–36) | 5–5–1 |
| 12 | L | December 17, 1935 | 0–1 | Toronto Maple Leafs (1935–36) | 5–6–1 |
| 13 | W | December 21, 1935 | 2–1 | @ Montreal Canadiens (1935–36) | 6–6–1 |
| 14 | T | December 22, 1935 | 2–2 OT | @ Detroit Red Wings (1935–36) | 6–6–2 |
| 15 | W | December 26, 1935 | 2–1 | @ New York Americans (1935–36) | 7–6–2 |
| 16 | L | December 28, 1935 | 3–6 | Boston Bruins (1935–36) | 7–7–2 |
| 17 | L | December 31, 1935 | 0–1 | @ New York Rangers (1935–36) | 7–8–2 |

January

| Game | Result | Date | Score | Opponent | Record |
|---|---|---|---|---|---|
| 18 | W | January 2, 1936 | 5–2 | Toronto Maple Leafs (1935–36) | 8–8–2 |
| 19 | T | January 4, 1936 | 1–1 OT | @ Toronto Maple Leafs (1935–36) | 8–8–3 |
| 20 | W | January 5, 1936 | 3–2 | @ Chicago Black Hawks (1935–36) | 9–8–3 |
| 21 | T | January 9, 1936 | 1–1 OT | @ Montreal Canadiens (1935–36) | 9–8–4 |
| 22 | W | January 11, 1936 | 3–2 | New York Americans (1935–36) | 10–8–4 |
| 23 | L | January 12, 1936 | 0–6 | @ Detroit Red Wings (1935–36) | 10–9–4 |
| 24 | L | January 14, 1936 | 1–2 | New York Rangers (1935–36) | 10–10–4 |
| 25 | W | January 19, 1936 | 2–1 | @ New York Americans (1935–36) | 11–10–4 |
| 26 | L | January 21, 1936 | 0–1 | @ Boston Bruins (1935–36) | 11–11–4 |
| 27 | W | January 25, 1936 | 4–1 | Montreal Canadiens (1935–36) | 12–11–4 |
| 28 | W | January 30, 1936 | 3–2 | @ New York Americans (1935–36) | 13–11–4 |

February

| Game | Result | Date | Score | Opponent | Record |
|---|---|---|---|---|---|
| 29 | L | February 2, 1936 | 2–4 | @ New York Rangers (1935–36) | 13–12–4 |
| 30 | T | February 4, 1936 | 1–1 OT | New York Americans (1935–36) | 13–12–5 |
| 31 | W | February 8, 1936 | 7–2 | Montreal Canadiens (1935–36) | 14–12–5 |
| 32 | L | February 11, 1936 | 3–7 | @ Detroit Red Wings (1935–36) | 14–13–5 |
| 33 | W | February 13, 1936 | 2–1 | Toronto Maple Leafs (1935–36) | 15–13–5 |
| 34 | T | February 15, 1936 | 4–4 OT | New York Americans (1935–36) | 15–13–6 |
| 35 | T | February 19, 1936 | 8–8 OT | @ New York Americans (1935–36) | 15–13–7 |
| 36 | W | February 20, 1936 | 6–3 | Detroit Red Wings (1935–36) | 16–13–7 |
| 37 | L | February 22, 1936 | 0–1 | @ Toronto Maple Leafs (1935–36) | 16–14–7 |
| 38 | L | February 25, 1936 | 0–2 | Chicago Black Hawks (1935–36) | 16–15–7 |
| 39 | L | February 27, 1936 | 1–2 | Boston Bruins (1935–36) | 16–16–7 |
| 40 | W | February 29, 1936 | 4–2 | @ Montreal Canadiens (1935–36) | 17–16–7 |

March

| Game | Result | Date | Score | Opponent | Record |
|---|---|---|---|---|---|
| 41 | T | March 3, 1936 | 3–3 OT | @ Boston Bruins (1935–36) | 17–16–8 |
| 42 | W | March 7, 1936 | 5–3 | Detroit Red Wings (1935–36) | 18–16–8 |
| 43 | T | March 10, 1936 | 0–0 OT | New York Rangers (1935–36) | 18–16–9 |
| 44 | T | March 12, 1936 | 3–3 OT | @ Chicago Black Hawks (1935–36) | 18–16–10 |
| 45 | W | March 14, 1936 | 1–0 | @ Toronto Maple Leafs (1935–36) | 19–16–10 |
| 46 | W | March 15, 1936 | 3–1 | Montreal Canadiens (1935–36) | 20–16–10 |
| 47 | W | March 17, 1936 | 2–1 | Toronto Maple Leafs (1935–36) | 21–16–10 |
| 48 | W | March 21, 1936 | 3–1 | Chicago Black Hawks (1935–36) | 22–16–10 |

Legend: Win (2 points) Loss (0 points) Tie (1 point)

== Player statistics ==
=== Regular season ===
Scoring

| Player | Pos | GP | G | A | Pts | PIM |
|---|---|---|---|---|---|---|
| Hooley Smith | C/RW | 47 | 19 | 19 | 38 | 75 |
| Baldy Northcott | D/LW | 48 | 15 | 21 | 36 | 41 |
| Jimmy Ward | RW | 48 | 12 | 19 | 31 | 30 |
| Bob Gracie | C/LW | 48 | 11 | 14 | 25 | 31 |
| Russ Blinco | C | 46 | 13 | 10 | 23 | 10 |
| Dave Trottier | LW | 46 | 10 | 10 | 20 | 25 |
| Earl Robinson | RW/C | 39 | 6 | 14 | 20 | 27 |
| Gus Marker | RW | 48 | 7 | 12 | 19 | 10 |
| Herb Cain | LW | 48 | 5 | 13 | 18 | 16 |
| Lionel Conacher | D | 46 | 7 | 7 | 14 | 65 |
| Cy Wentworth | D | 48 | 4 | 5 | 9 | 24 |
| Al Shields | D | 45 | 2 | 7 | 9 | 81 |
| Stewart Evans | D | 48 | 3 | 5 | 8 | 57 |
| Joe Lamb | RW | 35 | 0 | 3 | 3 | 12 |
| Bill Beveridge | G | 32 | 0 | 0 | 0 | 0 |
| Lorne Chabot | G | 16 | 0 | 0 | 0 | 0 |
| Bill Miller | C/D | 8 | 0 | 0 | 0 | 0 |

Goaltending

| Player | MIN | GP | W | L | T | GA | GAA | SO |
|---|---|---|---|---|---|---|---|---|
| Bill Beveridge | 1970 | 32 | 14 | 13 | 5 | 71 | 2.16 | 1 |
| Lorne Chabot | 1010 | 16 | 8 | 3 | 5 | 35 | 2.08 | 2 |
| Team: | 2980 | 48 | 22 | 16 | 10 | 106 | 2.13 | 3 |

=== Playoffs ===
Scoring

| Player | Pos | GP | G | A | Pts | PIM |
|---|---|---|---|---|---|---|
| Gus Marker | RW | 3 | 1 | 0 | 1 | 2 |
| Herb Cain | LW | 3 | 0 | 1 | 1 | 0 |
| Bob Gracie | C/LW | 3 | 0 | 1 | 1 | 0 |
| Russ Blinco | C | 3 | 0 | 0 | 0 | 0 |
| Lorne Chabot | G | 3 | 0 | 0 | 0 | 0 |
| Lionel Conacher | D | 3 | 0 | 0 | 0 | 0 |
| Stewart Evans | D | 3 | 0 | 0 | 0 | 0 |
| Joe Lamb | RW | 3 | 0 | 0 | 0 | 2 |
| Baldy Northcott | D/LW | 3 | 0 | 0 | 0 | 0 |
| Earl Robinson | RW/C | 3 | 0 | 0 | 0 | 0 |
| Al Shields | D | 3 | 0 | 0 | 0 | 6 |
| Hooley Smith | C/RW | 3 | 0 | 0 | 0 | 2 |
| Dave Trottier | LW | 3 | 0 | 0 | 0 | 4 |
| Jimmy Ward | RW | 3 | 0 | 0 | 0 | 6 |
| Cy Wentworth | D | 3 | 0 | 0 | 0 | 0 |

Goaltending

| Player | MIN | GP | W | L | GA | GAA | SO |
|---|---|---|---|---|---|---|---|
| Lorne Chabot | 297 | 3 | 0 | 3 | 6 | 1.21 | 0 |
| Team: | 297 | 3 | 0 | 3 | 6 | 1.21 | 0 |

Note: GP = Games played; G = Goals; A = Assists; Pts = Points; +/- = Plus/minus; PIM = Penalty minutes; PPG = Power-play goals; SHG = Short-handed goals; GWG = Game-winning goals
MIN = Minutes played; W = Wins; L = Losses; T = Ties; GA = Goals against; GAA = Goals against average; SO = Shutouts;
