= 1935–36 Toronto Maple Leafs season =

NHL hockey team season

1935–36 Toronto Maple Leafs
- Division: 2nd Canadian
- 1935–36 record: 23–19–6
- Home record: 15–4–5
- Road record: 8–15–1
- Goals for: 126
- Goals against: 106

Team information
- General manager: Conn Smythe
- Coach: Dick Irvin
- Captain: Hap Day
- Arena: Maple Leaf Gardens

Team leaders
- Goals: Charlie Conacher; Bill Thoms (23)
- Assists: Charlie Conacher; Bill Thoms (15)
- Points: Charlie Conacher; Bill Thoms (38)
- Penalty minutes: Red Horner (167)
- Wins: George Hainsworth (23)
- Goals against average: George Hainsworth (2.12)

The 1935–36 Toronto Maple Leafs season was Toronto's 19th season in the National Hockey League (NHL). The Maple Leafs made it to the Stanley Cup Finals, losing 3–1 to the Detroit Red Wings.

== Regular season ==
=== Final standings ===
Canadian Division
	GP	W	L	T	GF	GA	PTS
**Montreal Maroons**	48	22	16	10	114	106	54
**Toronto Maple Leafs**	48	23	19	6	126	106	52
**New York Americans**	48	16	25	7	109	122	39
Montreal Canadiens	48	11	26	11	82	123	33

Note: W = Wins, L = Losses, T = Ties, GF = Goals For, GA = Goals Against, Pts = Points
Teams that qualified for the playoffs are highlighted in bold.

=== Record vs. opponents ===
==== Vs. Canadian Division ====
1935–36 NHL records
Team	**MTL**	**MTM**	**NYA**	**TOR**	**Total**
M. Canadiens	—	1–6–1	5–3	2–6	**8–15–1**
M. Maroons	6–1–1	—	4–1–3	5–2–1	**15–4–5**
N.Y. Americans	3–5	1–4–3	—	4–3–1	**8–12–4**
Toronto	6–2	2–5–1	3–4–1	—	**11–11–2**

==== Vs. American Division ====
1935–36 NHL records
Team	**BOS**	**CHI**	**DET**	**NYR**	**Total**
M. Canadiens	1–3–2	1–2–3	0–4–2	1–2–3	**3–11–10**
M. Maroons	1–4–1	3–2–1	3–2–1	0–4–2	**7–12–5**
N.Y. Americans	2–4	3–2–1	1–4–1	2–3–1	**8–13–3**
Toronto	3–1–2	3–3	3–3	3–1–2	**12–8–4**

== Schedule and results ==
1935–36 regular season
November

Game	Result	Date	Score	Opponent	Record
1	T	November 9, 1935	5–5 OT	New York Americans (1935–36)	0–0–1
2	W	November 14, 1935	1–0	@ New York Rangers (1935–36)	1–0–1
3	W	November 16, 1935	3–2	New York Rangers (1935–36)	2–0–1
4	W	November 19, 1935	7–2	@ Montreal Canadiens (1935–36)	3–0–1
5	L	November 21, 1935	3–4	@ Chicago Black Hawks (1935–36)	3–1–1
6	L	November 23, 1935	2–5	Montreal Maroons (1935–36)	3–2–1
7	L	November 24, 1935	1–2	@ Detroit Red Wings (1935–36)	3–3–1
8	W	November 26, 1935	2–1	@ Boston Bruins (1935–36)	4–3–1
9	W	November 30, 1935	8–3	Montreal Canadiens (1935–36)	5–3–1

December

Game	Result	Date	Score	Opponent	Record
10	W	December 7, 1935	2–1 OT	Chicago Black Hawks (1935–36)	6–3–1
11	L	December 10, 1935	2–4	@ New York Americans (1935–36)	6–4–1
12	L	December 14, 1935	2–4 OT	Detroit Red Wings (1935–36)	6–5–1
13	W	December 17, 1935	1–0	@ Montreal Maroons (1935–36)	7–5–1
14	T	December 19, 1935	0–0 OT	Boston Bruins (1935–36)	7–5–2
15	W	December 21, 1935	5–3	New York Americans (1935–36)	8–5–2
16	W	December 26, 1935	2–0	@ Montreal Canadiens (1935–36)	9–5–2
17	W	December 28, 1935	9–3	New York Rangers (1935–36)	10–5–2

January

Game	Result	Date	Score	Opponent	Record
18	L	January 2, 1936	2–5	@ Montreal Maroons (1935–36)	10–6–2
19	T	January 4, 1936	1–1 OT	Montreal Maroons (1935–36)	10–6–3
20	L	January 11, 1936	3–7	Montreal Canadiens (1935–36)	10–7–3
21	L	January 14, 1936	1–4	@ Boston Bruins (1935–36)	10–8–3
22	L	January 16, 1936	0–1	@ New York Rangers (1935–36)	10–9–3
23	W	January 18, 1936	5–2	Boston Bruins (1935–36)	11–9–3
24	L	January 19, 1936	0–4	@ Detroit Red Wings (1935–36)	11–10–3
25	L	January 23, 1936	2–3 OT	@ New York Americans (1935–36)	11–11–3
26	W	January 25, 1936	6–1	Detroit Red Wings (1935–36)	12–11–3
27	L	January 30, 1936	0–3	@ Montreal Canadiens (1935–36)	12–12–3

February

Game	Result	Date	Score	Opponent	Record
28	W	February 1, 1936	3–2 OT	Chicago Black Hawks (1935–36)	13–12–3
29	L	February 2, 1936	0–2	@ Chicago Black Hawks (1935–36)	13–13–3
30	W	February 4, 1936	3–0	@ Boston Bruins (1935–36)	14–13–3
31	L	February 6, 1936	3–4	@ New York Americans (1935–36)	14–14–3
32	W	February 8, 1936	3–0	New York Americans (1935–36)	15–14–3
33	L	February 13, 1936	1–2	@ Montreal Maroons (1935–36)	15–15–3
34	W	February 15, 1936	3–2 OT	Detroit Red Wings (1935–36)	16–15–3
35	W	February 20, 1936	2–1	Montreal Canadiens (1935–36)	17–15–3
36	W	February 22, 1936	1–0	Montreal Maroons (1935–36)	18–15–3
37	L	February 23, 1936	1–5	@ Chicago Black Hawks (1935–36)	18–16–3
38	T	February 25, 1936	2–2 OT	New York Rangers (1935–36)	18–16–4
39	W	February 29, 1936	4–2	Chicago Black Hawks (1935–36)	19–16–4

March

Game	Result	Date	Score	Opponent	Record
40	T	March 3, 1936	0–0 OT	@ New York Rangers (1935–36)	19–16–5
41	W	March 7, 1936	8–1	Montreal Canadiens (1935–36)	20–16–5
42	L	March 10, 1936	2–3	@ New York Americans (1935–36)	20–17–5
43	W	March 12, 1936	6–3	@ Montreal Canadiens (1935–36)	21–17–5
44	L	March 14, 1936	0–1	Montreal Maroons (1935–36)	21–18–5
45	W	March 15, 1936	2–1 OT	@ Detroit Red Wings (1935–36)	22–18–5
46	L	March 17, 1936	1–2	@ Montreal Maroons (1935–36)	22–19–5
47	T	March 19, 1936	2–2 OT	Boston Bruins (1935–36)	22–19–6
48	W	March 21, 1936	4–1	New York Americans (1935–36)	23–19–6

Legend: Win (2 points) Loss (0 points) Tie (1 point)

== Playoffs ==
- Won Quarter-final (Total goals: 8–6) versus Boston Bruins
- Won Semi-final (2–1) versus New York Americans

=== Final ===
In the Stanley Cup Finals, the Leafs lost a best-of-five series 3–1 to the Detroit Red Wings.

== Player statistics ==
=== Regular season ===
Scoring

Player	Pos	GP	G	A	Pts	PIM
Charlie Conacher	RW	44	23	15	38	74
Bill Thoms	C	48	23	15	38	29
Buzz Boll	LW	44	15	13	28	14
Busher Jackson	LW	47	11	11	22	19
Nick Metz	LW	38	14	6	20	14
Art Jackson	C	48	5	15	20	14
Pep Kelly	RW	42	11	8	19	24
Joe Primeau	C	45	4	13	17	10
King Clancy	D	47	5	10	15	61
Hap Day	D	44	1	13	14	41
Red Horner	D	43	2	9	11	167
Andy Blair	C	45	5	4	9	60
Bob Davidson	LW	35	4	4	8	32
Frank Finnigan	RW	48	2	6	8	10
Flash Hollett	D	11	1	4	5	8
Jack Markle	RW	8	0	1	1	0
Jack Shill	C	3	0	1	1	0
Mickey Blake	LW/D	1	0	0	0	2
George Hainsworth	G	48	0	0	0	0
Reg Hamilton	D	7	0	0	0	0

Goaltending

Player	MIN	GP	W	L	T	GA	GAA	SO
George Hainsworth	3000	48	23	19	6	106	2.12	8
Team:	3000	48	23	19	6	106	2.12	8

=== Playoffs ===
Scoring

Player	Pos	GP	G	A	Pts	PIM
Buzz Boll	LW	9	7	3	10	2
Bill Thoms	C	9	3	5	8	0
Joe Primeau	C	9	3	4	7	0
Charlie Conacher	RW	9	3	2	5	12
Busher Jackson	LW	9	3	2	5	4
Pep Kelly	RW	9	2	3	5	4
King Clancy	D	9	2	2	4	10
Bob Davidson	LW	9	1	3	4	2
Red Horner	D	9	1	2	3	22
Frank Finnigan	RW	9	0	3	3	0
Art Jackson	C	8	0	3	3	2
Jack Shill	C	9	0	3	3	8
Andy Blair	C	9	0	0	0	2
Hap Day	D	9	0	0	0	8
George Hainsworth	G	9	0	0	0	0
Norman Mann	RW/C	1	0	0	0	0

Goaltending

Player	MIN	GP	W	L	GA	GAA	SO
George Hainsworth	541	9	4	5	27	2.99	0
Team:	541	9	4	5	27	2.99	0

Note:

Pos = Position;GP = Games played; G = Goals; A = Assists; Pts = Points; PIM = Penalty minutes; +/- = Plus/minus; PPG = Power-play goals; SHG = Short-handed goals; GWG = Game-winning goals
Pos = Position;GP = Games played; Min, TOI = Minutes played; W = Wins; L = Losses; T,T/OT = Ties; OTL = Overtime losses; GA = Goals-against; GAA = Goals-against average; SO = Shutouts; SA = Shots against; SV = Shots saved;SV% = Save percentage;

== Transactions ==
- September 29, 1935: Traded Hec Kilrea to the Detroit Red Wings for $7,500 and Future Considerations
- October 7, 1935: Signed Free Agent Norman Mann
- October 9, 1935: Traded Baldy Cotton to the New York Americans for cash
- October 15, 1935: Acquired Mickey Blake and Fido Purpur in the Dispersal Draft from the St. Louis Eagles
- October 22, 1935: Signed free agents George Parsons, Jack Howard and Jimmy Fowler
- November 6, 1935: Traded Fido Purpur to the St. Louis Flyers of the AHA for cash
- January 15, 1936: Traded Flash Hollett to the Boston Bruins for $16,000
- January 20, 1936: Loaned Jack Markle from the Syracuse Stars of the IHL

== See also ==
- 1935–36 NHL season
