= 1935–36 Detroit Red Wings season =

Sports season

1935–36 Detroit Red Wings
- Stanley Cup champions
- Division: 1st American
- 1935–36 record: 24–16–8
- Home record: 14–5–5
- Road record: 10–11–3
- Goals for: 124
- Goals against: 103

Team information
- General manager: Jack Adams
- Coach: Jack Adams
- Captain: Doug Young
- Arena: Olympia Stadium

Team leaders
- Goals: Marty Barry (21)
- Assists: Herbie Lewis (23)
- Points: Marty Barry (40)
- Penalty minutes: Ebbie Goodfellow (69)
- Wins: Normie Smith (24)
- Goals against average: Normie Smith (2.04)

The 1935–36 Detroit Red Wings season was the tenth season for the Detroit franchise in the National Hockey League (NHL) and the fourth operating as the Red Wings. Under head coach Jack Adams, the Red Wings compiled a 24–16–8 record, finished first in the American Division, and won the Stanley Cup championship. The Wings scored 124 goals, second most in the NHL, and gave up 103 goals by opponents. The team played its home games at Olympia Stadium in Detroit.

In the Stanley Cup semifinals, the Wings defeated the Montreal Maroons, three games to zero. The first game of the series was the longest NHL game ever played. The game began at 8:30 p.m. at the Forum in Montreal, and ended at 2:25 a.m. when Mud Bruneteau scored in the sixth overtime period.

In the 1936 Stanley Cup Finals, the Wings defeated the Toronto Maple Leafs, three games to one. The Stanley Cup championship was the first in Detroit franchise history.

Defenceman Doug Young was the team captain. The team's statistical leaders included Marty Barry with 21 goals and 40 points scored, Herbie Lewis with 23 assists, and Ebbie Goodfellow with 69 penalty minutes. Barry's 40 points were the second most in the NHL during the 1935–36 season; his 21 goals were third most in the league. Normie Smith was the team's goaltender in all 48 games. Smith's 24 wins as goaltender and 3,030 minutes played led the NHL during the 1935–36 season.

Four members of the team have been inducted into the Hockey Hall of Fame: Ebbie Goodfellow (inducted in 1963); Syd Howe (inducted 1965); Marty Barry (inducted 1965); and Herbie Lewis (inducted 1989).

== Regular season ==
=== Final standings ===
American Division
	GP	W	L	T	GF	GA	PTS
**Detroit Red Wings**	48	24	16	8	124	103	56
**Boston Bruins**	48	22	20	6	92	83	50
**Chicago Black Hawks**	48	21	19	8	93	92	50
New York Rangers	48	19	17	12	91	96	50

Note: GP = Games Played, W = Wins, L = Losses, T = Ties, Pts = Points, GF = Goals For, GA = Goals Against
Teams that qualified for the playoffs are highlighted in bold.

=== Record vs. opponents ===
==== Vs. American Division ====
1935–36 NHL records
Team	**BOS**	**CHI**	**DET**	**NYR**	**Total**
Boston	—	3–4–1	5–3	2–6	**10–13–1**
Chicago	4–3–1	—	3–4–1	5–2–1	**12–9–3**
Detroit	3–5	4–3–1	—	4–1–3	**11–9–4**
N.Y. Rangers	6–2	2–5–1	1–4–3	—	**9–11–4**

==== Vs. Canadian Division ====
1935–36 NHL records
Team	**MTL**	**MTM**	**NYA**	**TOR**	**Total**
Boston	3–1–2	4–1–1	4–2	1–3–2	**12–7–5**
Chicago	2–1–3	2–3–1	2–3–1	3–3	**9–10–5**
Detroit	4–0–2	2–3–1	4–1–1	3–3	**13–7–4**
N.Y. Rangers	2–1–3	4–0–2	3–2–1	1–3–2	**10–6–8**

== Schedule and results ==
1935–36 regular season
November

Game	Result	Date	Score	Opponent	Record
1	T	November 10, 1935	1–1 OT	New York Rangers (1935–36)	0–0–1
2	T	November 14, 1935	0–0 OT	Chicago Black Hawks (1935–36)	0–0–2
3	T	November 19, 1935	2–2 OT	@ New York Rangers (1935–36)	0–0–3
4	L	November 21, 1935	1–3	@ New York Americans (1935–36)	0–1–3
5	W	November 24, 1935	2–1	Toronto Maple Leafs (1935–36)	1–1–3
6	T	November 28, 1935	0–0 OT	Montreal Canadiens (1935–36)	1–1–4
7	L	November 30, 1935	2–3	@ Montreal Maroons (1935–36)	1–2–4

December

Game	Result	Date	Score	Opponent	Record
8	W	December 5, 1935	2–1	Boston Bruins (1935–36)	2–2–4
9	W	December 7, 1935	3–2	@ Montreal Canadiens (1935–36)	3–2–4
10	T	December 8, 1935	1–1 OT	New York Americans (1935–36)	3–2–5
11	W	December 12, 1935	3–1	@ Chicago Black Hawks (1935–36)	4–2–5
12	W	December 14, 1935	4–2 OT	@ Toronto Maple Leafs (1935–36)	5–2–5
13	W	December 15, 1935	4–2	New York Rangers (1935–36)	6–2–5
14	L	December 17, 1935	1–4	@ Boston Bruins (1935–36)	6–3–5
15	W	December 19, 1935	3–1	@ New York Americans (1935–36)	7–3–5
16	T	December 22, 1935	2–2 OT	Montreal Maroons (1935–36)	7–3–6
17	L	December 25, 1935	0–2	Chicago Black Hawks (1935–36)	7–4–6
18	L	December 29, 1935	3–4 OT	Boston Bruins (1935–36)	7–5–6

January

Game	Result	Date	Score	Opponent	Record
19	W	January 1, 1936	4–2	@ Chicago Black Hawks (1935–36)	8–5–6
20	W	January 5, 1936	5–2	Montreal Canadiens (1935–36)	9–5–6
21	W	January 7, 1936	2–1	@ New York Rangers (1935–36)	10–5–6
22	W	January 12, 1936	6–0	Montreal Maroons (1935–36)	11–5–6
23	L	January 16, 1936	1–4	@ Chicago Black Hawks (1935–36)	11–6–6
24	W	January 19, 1936	4–0	Toronto Maple Leafs (1935–36)	12–6–6
25	W	January 23, 1936	4–2	New York Rangers (1935–36)	13–6–6
26	L	January 25, 1936	1–6	@ Toronto Maple Leafs (1935–36)	13–7–6
27	L	January 28, 1936	0–2	@ Boston Bruins (1935–36)	13–8–6
28	L	January 30, 1936	3–4	Chicago Black Hawks (1935–36)	13–9–6

February

Game	Result	Date	Score	Opponent	Record
29	W	February 1, 1936	3–1	@ Montreal Canadiens (1935–36)	14–9–6
30	T	February 4, 1936	4–4 OT	@ New York Rangers (1935–36)	14–9–7
31	W	February 6, 1936	1–0	@ Chicago Black Hawks (1935–36)	15–9–7
32	W	February 11, 1936	7–3	Montreal Maroons (1935–36)	16–9–7
33	W	February 13, 1936	1–0	Boston Bruins (1935–36)	17–9–7
34	L	February 15, 1936	2–3 OT	@ Toronto Maple Leafs (1935–36)	17–10–7
35	W	February 18, 1936	2–1	@ Boston Bruins (1935–36)	18–10–7
36	L	February 20, 1936	3–6	@ Montreal Maroons (1935–36)	18–11–7
37	W	February 23, 1936	4–3	New York Americans (1935–36)	19–11–7
38	W	February 27, 1936	4–2	New York Rangers (1935–36)	20–11–7

March

Game	Result	Date	Score	Opponent	Record
39	W	March 1, 1936	3–1	Montreal Canadiens (1935–36)	21–11–7
40	W	March 5, 1936	4–1	@ New York Americans (1935–36)	22–11–7
41	L	March 7, 1936	3–5	@ Montreal Maroons (1935–36)	22–12–7
42	L	March 8, 1936	2–5	Boston Bruins (1935–36)	22–13–7
43	L	March 10, 1936	0–1 OT	@ Boston Bruins (1935–36)	22–14–7
44	L	March 12, 1936	3–4 OT	@ New York Rangers (1935–36)	22–15–7
45	T	March 14, 1936	1–1 OT	@ Montreal Canadiens (1935–36)	22–15–8
46	L	March 15, 1936	1–2 OT	Toronto Maple Leafs (1935–36)	22–16–8
47	W	March 19, 1936	5–3	Chicago Black Hawks (1935–36)	23–16–8
48	W	March 22, 1936	7–2	New York Americans (1935–36)	24–16–8

Legend: Win (2 points) Loss (0 points) Tie (1 point)

== Player statistics ==
=== Forwards ===
Note: GP = Games played; G = Goals; A = Assists; Pts = Points; PIM = Penalty minutes

Player	GP	G	A	Pts	PIM
Marty Barry	48	21	19	40	16
Herbie Lewis	45	14	23	37	25
Larry Aurie	44	16	18	34	17
Syd Howe	48	16	14	30	26
John Sorrell	48	13	15	28	8
Hec Kilrea	48	6	17	23	37
Gordon Pettinger	33	8	7	15	6
Pete Kelly	48	6	8	14	30
Wally Kilrea	44	4	10	14	10
Mud Bruneteau	24	2	0	2	2
Art Giroux	4	0	2	2	0
Wilfie Starr	5	1	0	1	0
John Sherf	1	0	0	0	0
Eddie Wiseman	1	0	0	0	0
Lorne Duguid	5	0	0	0	0

=== Defensemen ===
Note: GP = Games played; G = Goals; A = Assists; Pts = Points; PIM = Penalty minutes

Player	GP	G	A	Pts	PIM
Ebbie Goodfellow	48	5	18	23	69
Doug Young	48	5	12	17	54
Wilfred McDonald	48	4	6	10	32
Ralph Bowman	48	3	2	5	44
Orville Roulston	1	0	0	0	0

=== Goaltending ===
Note: GP = Games played; MIN = Minutes; W = Wins; L = Losses; T = Ties; SO = Shutouts; GAA = Goals against average

Player	GP	MIN	W	L	T	SO	GAA
Normie Smith	48	3030	24	16	8	6	2.04

== Playoffs ==
=== (C1) Montreal Maroons vs. (A1) Detroit Red Wings ===
Montreal Maroons vs Detroit Red Wings
Date	Visitors	Score	Home	Score
Mar 24	Detroit	1	Montreal M.	0 (6OT)
Mar 26	Detroit	3	Montreal M.	0
Mar 28	Montreal M.	1	Detroit	2

Detroit wins best-of-five series 3–0.

Toronto Maple Leafs vs. Detroit Red Wings

Date	Away	Score	Home	Score	Notes
April 5	Toronto Maple Leafs	1	Detroit Red Wings	3	
April 7	Toronto Maple Leafs	4	Detroit Red Wings	9	
April 9	Detroit Red Wings	3	Toronto Maple Leafs	4	OT
April 11	Detroit Red Wings	3	Toronto Maple Leafs	2	

Detroit wins best-of-five series 3–1.
