= Gaston Leroux (disambiguation) =

Gaston Leroux was a French writer.

Gaston Leroux may also refer to:

- Gaston Leroux (ice hockey) (1913–1988), Canadian ice hockey defenceman
- Gaston Leroux (politician) (born 1948), member of the Canadian House of Commons
