= 1936 Stanley Cup Final =

1936 ice hockey championship series

| | 1 | 2 | 3 | 4 | Total |
|---|---|---|---|---|---|
| Detroit Red Wings | 3 | 9 | 3* | 3 | 3 |
| Toronto Maple Leafs | 1 | 4 | 4* | 2 | 1 |
- * – Denotes overtime period(s)
- Location(s): Detroit: Olympia Stadium (1, 2); Toronto: Maple Leaf Gardens (3, 4)
- Format: best-of-five
- Coaches: Detroit: Jack Adams; Toronto: Dick Irvin
- Captains: Detroit: Doug Young; Toronto: Hap Day
- Dates: April 5–11, 1936
- Series-winning goal: Pete Kelly (9:45, third)
- Hall of Famers: Red Wings: Marty Barry (1965); Ebbie Goodfellow (1963); Syd Howe (1965); Herbie Lewis (1989); Maple Leafs: King Clancy (1958); Charlie Conacher (1961); Hap Day (1961); George Hainsworth (1961); Red Horner (1965); Busher Jackson (1971); Joe Primeau (1963); Coaches: Jack Adams (1936, player); Dick Irvin (1958, player)

The 1936 Stanley Cup Final was contested by the Detroit Red Wings and the Toronto Maple Leafs. This was Detroit's second appearance in the Finals and Toronto's sixth. Detroit would win the series 3–1 to win their first Stanley Cup. This marked the sixth consecutive season of a different winner, and the eighth of the first ten teams (excluding the New York Americans and the Pittsburgh Pirates/Philadelphia Quakers, who never won the Cup) to win in the ten seasons since the Stanley Cup became exclusive to the NHL.

== Path to the Final ==
Detroit defeated the defending champion Montreal Maroons in a best-of-five 3–0 to advance to the Finals. The Leafs had to play a total-goals series; 8–6 against Boston Bruins, and win a best-of-three 2–1 against the New York Americans to advance to the Finals.

== Game summaries ==
| April 5 | Toronto Maple Leafs | 1–3 | Detroit Red Wings | Olympia Stadium | Recap |
| Buzz Boll (5) - 12:15 | | First period | 4:53 - sh - Bucko McDonald (1); 5:37 - Syd Howe (2); 12:05 - Wally Kilrea (1) |
| No scoring | | Second period | No scoring |
| No scoring | | Third period | No scoring |
| George Hainsworth | | Goalie stats | Normie Smith |

| April 7 | Toronto Maple Leafs | 4–9 | Detroit Red Wings | Olympia Stadium | Recap |
| Buzz Boll (6) - 12:35 | | First period | 1:30 - Wally Kilrea (2); 4:25 - Marty Barry (1); 10:05 - pp - Herbie Lewis (2); 16:55 - Bucko McDonald (2) |
| Joe Primeau (1) - 14:00 | | Second period | 7:15 - pp - John Sorrell (2); 9:10 - Gord Pettinger (1) |
| Bill Thoms (2) - 9:40; Bob Davidson (1) - 16:10 | | Third period | 7:30 - John Sorrell (3); 12:05 - Gord Pettinger; 17:15 - Bucko McDonald (3) |
| George Hainsworth | | Goalie stats | Normie Smith |

| April 9 | Detroit Red Wings | 3–4 | OT | Toronto Maple Leafs | Maple Leaf Gardens | Recap |
| Ralph Bowman (2) - 9:23 | | First period | | No scoring |
| Mud Bruneteau (2) - 1:05 | | Second period | | No scoring |
| Syd Howe (3) - 11:15 | | Third period | | 13:09 - Joe Primeau (2); 15:20 - Pep Kelly (1); 19:19 - Pep Kelly (2) |
| No scoring | | First overtime period | | 00:30 - Buzz Boll (7) |
| Normie Smith | | Goalie stats | | George Hainsworth |

| April 11 | Detroit Red Wings | 3–2 | Toronto Maple Leafs | Maple Leaf Gardens | Recap |
| No scoring | | First period | 15:10 - Joe Primeau (3) |
| Ebbie Goodfellow (1) - 9:55; Marty Barry (2) - 10:38 | | Second period | No scoring |
| Pete Kelly (1) - 9:45 | | Third period | 10:57 - Bill Thoms (3) |
| Normie Smith | | Goalie stats | George Hainsworth |

| Detroit won series 3–1 |

== Stanley Cup engraving ==
The 1936 Stanley Cup was presented to Red Wings captain Doug Young by NHL President Frank Calder following the Red Wings 3–2 win over the Maple Leafs in game four.

The following Red Wings players and staff had their names engraved on the Stanley Cup

1935–36 Detroit Red Wings

=== Players ===
Centres

- 7 Marty Barry
- 9 Wally Kilrea
- 11 Gord Pettinger

Wingers

- 4 Herbie Lewis
- 6 Larry Aurie
- 8 Syd Howe
- 10 John Sorrell
- 12 Hec Kilrea
- 14 Mordere "Mud" Bruneteau
- 15 Pete Kelly

Defencemen

- 2 Doug Young (Captain)
- 3 Wilfred Bucko McDonald
- 5 Ebbie Goodfellow
- 16 Ralph "Scotty" Bowman

Goaltenders

- 1 Normie Smith

=== Coaching and administrative staff ===
- James E. Norris Sr. (President/Owner), James D. Norris Jr. (Vice President/Owner)
- Arthur Wirtz Sr. (Secretary-Treasurer/Owner), Jack Adams (Manager-Coach)
- Frank "Honey" Walker (Trainer), John Gilles (Business Manager)

=== Stanley Cup engraving ===
- Four Red Wings were included on the team picture, but left off the Stanley Cup: #14 Wilfie Starr (C), #17 Art Giroux (RW), Les Tooke (G), and assistant trainer Carl Mattson. Tooke, who spent the season with the Windsor Shamrocks of the Michigan-Ontario Hockey League, was the Wings' spare goaltender; he never played in the NHL.

== Detroit: "City of Champions" ==
When the Red Wings won the 1936 Stanley Cup, the City of Detroit was mired in the Great Depression, which had hit Detroit and its industries particularly hard. But with the success of the Red Wings and other Detroit teams and athletes in the 1935/36 sports season, Detroit's luck appeared to be changing, as the city was dubbed the "City of Champions". The Detroit Tigers started the winning streak by winning the 1935 World Series, and the Detroit Lions continued the process by capturing the 1935 NFL Championship Game. When the Red Wings completed their own championship drive, the city had seen three major sporting league championships in less than a year.

== See also ==
- 1935–36 NHL season

== Notes ==
| Preceded by Montreal Maroons; 1935 | Detroit Red Wings; Stanley Cup champions 1936 | Succeeded by Detroit Red Wings; 1937 |
