= 1935–36 Chicago Black Hawks season =

NHL ice hockey team season

1935–36 Chicago Black Hawks
- Division: 3rd American
- 1935–36 record: 21–19–8
- Home record: 15–7–2
- Road record: 6–12–6
- Goals for: 93
- Goals against: 92

Team information
- General manager: Frederic McLaughlin
- Coach: Clem Loughlin
- Captain: Johnny Gottselig
- Arena: Chicago Stadium

Team leaders
- Goals: Paul Thompson (17)
- Assists: Doc Romnes (25)
- Points: Paul Thompson (40)
- Penalty minutes: Alex Levinsky (69)
- Wins: Mike Karakas (21)
- Goals against average: Mike Karakas (1.85)

The 1935–36 Chicago Black Hawks season was the team's tenth season in the NHL, and they were coming off a disappointing playoff run in 1935, as the Hawks lost to the Montreal Maroons in the 1st round, scoring no goals in the 2-game series. Chicago would name Johnny Gottselig as team captain, and would bring back Clem Loughlin as head coach after a successful regular season in 1934–35. The Hawks would fall to 3rd place in the American Division this season, finishing with a 21–19–8 record for 50 points. Chicago would actually tie the Boston Bruins and New York Rangers in points, however, would finish behind the Bruins, who had 22 wins in the season, and ahead of the Rangers, who had 19 victories.

Midway through the season, the Black Hawks and New York Rangers would make a trade, as Chicago sent Howie Morenz and Arthur Coulter to New York for Earl Seibert and Glen Brydson.

Paul Thompson would lead the Hawks with 17 goals and 40 points, while Doc Romnes had a team high 25 assists, and would win the Lady Byng Trophy, becoming the 1st Chicago player to win the award. Mush March would have a very strong season, earning 16 goals and 35 points, along with 42 penalty minutes, while defenseman Alex Levinsky would have a club high 69 penalty minutes.

In goal, the Hawks would go with rookie Mike Karakas, who was known to Chicago fans as he had previously played with the Chicago Shamrocks of the AHA. Karakas would win 21 games, and post a 1.85, helping the Black Hawks finish 2nd in the league with only 92 goals against.

Chicago would face the New York Americans in the opening round of the playoffs, as the teams would play a 2-game, total goals series. The Hawks were heavy favorites, as they finished with 12 more points than the Americans in the regular season. New York would jump out with a 3–0 victory in the 1st game, and the 3 goal difference was too much for the Black Hawks to overcome, as they defeated the Americans in the 2nd game 5–4, however, would lose the series by a 7–5 score.

== Season standings ==
American Division
	GP	W	L	T	GF	GA	PTS
**Detroit Red Wings**	48	24	16	8	124	103	56
**Boston Bruins**	48	22	20	6	92	83	50
**Chicago Black Hawks**	48	21	19	8	93	92	50
New York Rangers	48	19	17	12	91	96	50

Note: GP = Games Played, W = Wins, L = Losses, T = Ties, Pts = Points, GF = Goals For, GA = Goals Against
Teams that qualified for the playoffs are highlighted in bold.

=== Record vs. opponents ===
==== Vs. American Division ====
1935–36 NHL records
Team	**BOS**	**CHI**	**DET**	**NYR**	**Total**
Boston	—	3–4–1	5–3	2–6	**10–13–1**
Chicago	4–3–1	—	3–4–1	5–2–1	**12–9–3**
Detroit	3–5	4–3–1	—	4–1–3	**11–9–4**
N.Y. Rangers	6–2	2–5–1	1–4–3	—	**9–11–4**

==== Vs. Canadian Division ====
1935–36 NHL records
Team	**MTL**	**MTM**	**NYA**	**TOR**	**Total**
Boston	3–1–2	4–1–1	4–2	1–3–2	**12–7–5**
Chicago	2–1–3	2–3–1	2–3–1	3–3	**9–10–5**
Detroit	4–0–2	2–3–1	4–1–1	3–3	**13–7–4**
N.Y. Rangers	2–1–3	4–0–2	3–2–1	1–3–2	**10–6–8**

== Schedule and results ==
=== Regular season ===
1935–36 regular season
November

Game	Date	Visitor	Score	Home	Record	Points
1	November 7	New York Americans	1–3	Chicago Black Hawks	1–0–0	2
2	November 14	Chicago Black Hawks	0–0	Detroit Red Wings	1–0–1	3
3	November 17	New York Rangers	0–3	Chicago Black Hawks	2–0–1	5
4	November 21	Toronto Maple Leafs	3–4	Chicago Black Hawks	3–0–1	7
5	November 24	Montreal Maroons	1–2	Chicago Black Hawks	4–0–1	9
6	November 26	Chicago Black Hawks	1–4	Montreal Maroons	4–1–1	9
7	November 28	Chicago Black Hawks	1–2	New York Rangers	4–2–1	9

December

Game	Date	Visitor	Score	Home	Record	Points
8	December 1	Montreal Canadiens	0–1	Chicago Black Hawks	5–2–1	11
9	December 3	Chicago Black Hawks	3–1	Boston Bruins	6–2–1	13
10	December 7	Chicago Black Hawks	1–2	Toronto Maple Leafs	6–3–1	13
11	December 8	Boston Bruins	0–1	Chicago Black Hawks	7–3–1	15
12	December 12	Detroit Red Wings	3–1	Chicago Black Hawks	7–4–1	15
13	December 15	Chicago Black Hawks	0–3	New York Americans	7–5–1	15
14	December 19	Chicago Black Hawks	2–2	Montreal Canadiens	7–5–2	16
15	December 22	New York Americans	3–2	Chicago Black Hawks	7–6–2	16
16	December 25	Chicago Black Hawks	2–0	Detroit Red Wings	8–6–2	18
17	December 29	New York Rangers	1–3	Chicago Black Hawks	9–6–2	20

January

Game	Date	Visitor	Score	Home	Record	Points
18	January 1	Detroit Red Wings	4–2	Chicago Black Hawks	9–7–2	20
19	January 5	Montreal Maroons	3–2	Chicago Black Hawks	9–8–2	20
20	January 7	Chicago Black Hawks	0–2	Boston Bruins	9–9–2	20
21	January 9	Chicago Black Hawks	4–1	New York Americans	10–9–2	22
22	January 12	Montreal Canadiens	2–1	Chicago Black Hawks	10–10–2	22
23	January 16	Detroit Red Wings	1–4	Chicago Black Hawks	11–10–2	24
24	January 19	Boston Bruins	1–2	Chicago Black Hawks	12–10–2	26
25	January 21	Chicago Black Hawks	1–0	New York Rangers	13–10–2	28
26	January 23	Chicago Black Hawks	1–1	Montreal Canadiens	13–10–3	29
27	January 26	New York Rangers	1–2	Chicago Black Hawks	14–10–3	31
28	January 30	Chicago Black Hawks	4–3	Detroit Red Wings	15–10–3	33

February

Game	Date	Visitor	Score	Home	Record	Points
29	February 1	Chicago Black Hawks	2–3	Toronto Maple Leafs	15–11–3	33
30	February 2	Toronto Maple Leafs	0–2	Chicago Black Hawks	16–11–3	35
31	February 6	Detroit Red Wings	1–0	Chicago Black Hawks	16–12–3	35
32	February 9	New York Americans	4–1	Chicago Black Hawks	16–13–3	35
33	February 11	Chicago Black Hawks	1–7	Boston Bruins	16–14–3	35
34	February 13	Chicago Black Hawks	2–2	New York Americans	16–14–4	36
35	February 16	Boston Bruins	2–4	Chicago Black Hawks	17–14–4	38
36	February 18	Chicago Black Hawks	3–3	Montreal Canadiens	17–14–5	39
37	February 20	Chicago Black Hawks	1–1	New York Rangers	17–14–6	40
38	February 23	Toronto Maple Leafs	1–5	Chicago Black Hawks	18–14–6	42
39	February 25	Chicago Black Hawks	2–0	Montreal Maroons	19–14–6	44
40	February 29	Chicago Black Hawks	2–4	Toronto Maple Leafs	19–15–6	44

March

Game	Date	Visitor	Score	Home	Record	Points
41	March 1	New York Rangers	1–2	Chicago Black Hawks	20–15–6	46
42	March 5	Boston Bruins	2–2	Chicago Black Hawks	20–15–7	47
43	March 8	Montreal Canadiens	0–2	Chicago Black Hawks	21–15–7	49
44	March 12	Montreal Maroons	3–3	Chicago Black Hawks	21–15–8	50
45	March 15	Chicago Black Hawks	0–1	Boston Bruins	21–16–8	50
46	March 17	Chicago Black Hawks	2–4	New York Rangers	21–17–8	50
47	March 19	Chicago Black Hawks	3–5	Detroit Red Wings	21–18–8	50
48	March 21	Chicago Black Hawks	1–3	Montreal Maroons	21–19–8	50

Legend: Win (2 points) Loss (0 points) Tie (1 point)

== Playoffs ==
=== Americans 7, Black Hawks 5 ===
==== NHL quarter-finals ====
===== (A3) Chicago Black Hawks vs. (C3) New York Americans =====
March 24	Chicago Black Hawks	0 – 3	New York Americans	Madison Square Garden	Recap
No scoring		First period	1:55 – Schriner (1) – (Carr, Chapman); 16:40 – pp – Schriner (2) – (Chapman, Wiseman)
No scoring		Second period	No scoring
No scoring		Third period	9:52 – Carr (1) – (Jerwa)
Karakas (0-1-0)		Goalie stats	Worters (1-0-0)

March 26	New York Americans	4 – 5	Chicago Black Hawks	Chicago Stadium	Recap
Oliver (1) – (Cotton, Stewart) – 11:55; Jerwa (1) – (Oliver) – 12:26		First period	10:30 – March (1) – (Thompson, Gottselig)
Wiseman (1) – (Unassisted) – 19:42		Second period	15:45 – pp – Seibert (1) – (March, Gottselig); 18:58 – pp – March (2) – (Romnes, Thompson)
Schriner (3) – (Jerwa) – 15:30		Third period	16:18 – Romnes (1) – (March, Thompson); 18:22 – Seibert (2) – (March)
Worters (1-1-0)		Goalie stats	Karakas (1-1-0)

New York wins series 7 – 5

== Player statistics ==
=== Scoring leaders ===
Player	GP	G	A	Pts	PIM
Paul Thompson	48	17	23	40	19
Doc Romnes	48	13	25	38	6
Mush March	48	16	19	35	42
Johnny Gottselig	41	14	15	29	4
Don McFadyen	47	4	16	20	33

=== Goaltending ===
Player	GP	TOI	W	L	T	GA	SO	GAA
Mike Karakas	48	2990	21	19	8	92	9	1.85

=== Scoring leaders ===
Player	GP	G	A	Pts	PIM
Mush March	2	2	3	5	0
Doc Romnes	2	1	2	3	0
Paul Thompson	2	0	3	3	0
Earl Seibert	2	2	0	2	0
Johnny Gottselig	2	0	2	2	0

=== Goaltending ===
Player	GP	TOI	W	L	T	GA	SO	GAA
Mike Karakas	2	120	1	1	0	7	0	3.50
