= 1935–36 Boston Bruins season =

NHL team season

1935–36 Boston Bruins
- Division: 2nd American
- 1935–36 record: 22–20–6
- Home record: 15–8–1
- Road record: 7–12–5
- Goals for: 92
- Goals against: 83

Team information
- General manager: Art Ross
- Coach: Frank Patrick
- Captain: Eddie Shore
- Arena: Boston Garden

Team leaders
- Goals: Red Beattie (14); Cooney Weiland (14)
- Assists: Red Beattie (18)
- Points: Red Beattie
- Penalty minutes: Babe Siebert (66)
- Wins: Tiny Thompson (22)
- Goals against average: Tiny Thompson (1.68)

The 1935–36 Boston Bruins season was the Bruins' 12th season in the NHL.

== Regular season ==
=== Final standings ===
American Division
	GP	W	L	T	GF	GA	PTS
**Detroit Red Wings**	48	24	16	8	124	103	56
**Boston Bruins**	48	22	20	6	92	83	50
**Chicago Black Hawks**	48	21	19	8	93	92	50
New York Rangers	48	19	17	12	91	96	50

Note: GP = Games Played, W = Wins, L = Losses, T = Ties, Pts = Points, GF = Goals For, GA = Goals Against
Teams that qualified for the playoffs are highlighted in bold.

=== Record vs. opponents ===
==== Vs. American Division ====
1935–36 NHL records
Team	**BOS**	**CHI**	**DET**	**NYR**	**Total**
Boston	—	3–4–1	5–3	2–6	**10–13–1**
Chicago	4–3–1	—	3–4–1	5–2–1	**12–9–3**
Detroit	3–5	4–3–1	—	4–1–3	**11–9–4**
N.Y. Rangers	6–2	2–5–1	1–4–3	—	**9–11–4**

==== Vs. Canadian Division ====
1935–36 NHL records
Team	**MTL**	**MTM**	**NYA**	**TOR**	**Total**
Boston	3–1–2	4–1–1	4–2	1–3–2	**12–7–5**
Chicago	2–1–3	2–3–1	2–3–1	3–3	**9–10–5**
Detroit	4–0–2	2–3–1	4–1–1	3–3	**13–7–4**
N.Y. Rangers	2–1–3	4–0–2	3–2–1	1–3–2	**10–6–8**

== Schedule and results ==
1935–36 regular season
November

Game	Result	Date	Score	Opponent	Record
1	L	November 16, 1935	0–1	@ Montreal Maroons (1935–36)	0–1–0
2	W	November 19, 1935	1–0	New York Americans (1935–36)	1–1–0
3	L	November 24, 1935	0–1	@ New York Rangers (1935–36)	1–2–0
4	L	November 26, 1935	1–2	Toronto Maple Leafs (1935–36)	1–3–0
5	L	November 30, 1935	1–2	@ New York Americans (1935–36)	1–4–0

December

Game	Result	Date	Score	Opponent	Record
6	W	December 1, 1935	2–0	New York Rangers (1935–36)	2–4–0
7	L	December 3, 1935	1–3	Chicago Black Hawks (1935–36)	2–5–0
8	L	December 5, 1935	1–2	@ Detroit Red Wings (1935–36)	2–6–0
9	L	December 8, 1935	0–1	@ Chicago Black Hawks (1935–36)	2–7–0
10	W	December 10, 1935	2–0	Montreal Maroons (1935–36)	3–7–0
11	T	December 12, 1935	1–1 OT	@ Montreal Canadiens (1935–36)	3–7–1
12	W	December 15, 1935	2–1	Montreal Canadiens (1935–36)	4–7–1
13	W	December 17, 1935	4–1	Detroit Red Wings (1935–36)	5–7–1
14	T	December 19, 1935	0–0 OT	@ Toronto Maple Leafs (1935–36)	5–7–2
15	L	December 22, 1935	1–3	@ New York Rangers (1935–36)	5–8–2
16	L	December 25, 1935	2–3	New York Rangers (1935–36)	5–9–2
17	W	December 28, 1935	6–3	@ Montreal Maroons (1935–36)	6–9–2
18	W	December 29, 1935	4–3 OT	@ Detroit Red Wings (1935–36)	7–9–2

January

Game	Result	Date	Score	Opponent	Record
19	L	January 1, 1936	0–2	Montreal Canadiens (1935–36)	7–10–2
20	T	January 4, 1936	1–1 OT	@ Montreal Canadiens (1935–36)	7–10–3
21	W	January 7, 1936	2–0	Chicago Black Hawks (1935–36)	8–10–3
22	W	January 12, 1936	6–3	@ New York Rangers (1935–36)	9–10–3
23	W	January 14, 1936	4–1	Toronto Maple Leafs (1935–36)	10–10–3
24	L	January 18, 1936	2–5	@ Toronto Maple Leafs (1935–36)	10–11–3
25	L	January 19, 1936	1–2	@ Chicago Black Hawks (1935–36)	10–12–3
26	W	January 21, 1936	1–0	Montreal Maroons (1935–36)	11–12–3
27	W	January 26, 1936	2–1	@ New York Americans (1935–36)	12–12–3
28	W	January 28, 1936	2–0	Detroit Red Wings (1935–36)	13–12–3

February

Game	Result	Date	Score	Opponent	Record
29	W	February 2, 1936	2–1 OT	New York Americans (1935–36)	14–12–3
30	L	February 4, 1936	0–3	Toronto Maple Leafs (1935–36)	14–13–3
31	W	February 6, 1936	4–3	@ Montreal Canadiens (1935–36)	15–13–3
32	L	February 9, 1936	0–2	@ New York Rangers (1935–36)	15–14–3
33	W	February 11, 1936	7–1	Chicago Black Hawks (1935–36)	16–14–3
34	L	February 13, 1936	0–1	@ Detroit Red Wings (1935–36)	16–15–3
35	L	February 16, 1936	2–4	@ Chicago Black Hawks (1935–36)	16–16–3
36	L	February 18, 1936	1–2	Detroit Red Wings (1935–36)	16–17–3
37	L	February 23, 1936	3–4	New York Rangers (1935–36)	16–18–3
38	W	February 25, 1936	3–2	New York Americans (1935–36)	17–18–3
39	W	February 27, 1936	2–1	@ Montreal Maroons (1935–36)	18–18–3

March

Game	Result	Date	Score	Opponent	Record
40	L	March 1, 1936	2–5	@ New York Americans (1935–36)	18–19–3
41	T	March 3, 1936	3–3 OT	Montreal Maroons (1935–36)	18–19–4
42	T	March 5, 1936	2–2 OT	@ Chicago Black Hawks (1935–36)	18–19–5
43	W	March 8, 1936	5–2	@ Detroit Red Wings (1935–36)	19–19–5
44	W	March 10, 1936	1–0 OT	Detroit Red Wings (1935–36)	20–19–5
45	W	March 15, 1936	1–0	Chicago Black Hawks (1935–36)	21–19–5
46	W	March 17, 1936	1–0	Montreal Canadiens (1935–36)	22–19–5
47	T	March 19, 1936	2–2 OT	@ Toronto Maple Leafs (1935–36)	22–19–6
48	L	March 22, 1936	1–3	New York Rangers (1935–36)	22–20–6

Legend: Win (2 points) Loss (0 points) Tie (1 point)

== Playoffs ==
The Boston Bruins lost the Quarterfinals to the Toronto Maple Leafs 8 goals to 6 goals in a two-game total goal series.

== Player statistics ==
=== Regular season ===
Scoring

Player	Pos	GP	G	A	Pts	PIM
Red Beattie	LW	48	14	18	32	27
Cooney Weiland	C	48	14	13	27	15
Dit Clapper	RW/D	44	12	13	25	14
Babe Siebert	LW/D	45	12	9	21	66
Bill Cowley	C	48	11	10	21	17
Eddie Shore	D	45	3	16	19	61
Jim O'Neil	C/RW	48	2	11	13	49
Paul Runge	C/LW	33	8	2	10	14
Charlie Sands	C/RW	40	6	4	10	8
Roger Jenkins	RW/D	40	2	6	8	51
Ted Graham	D	48	4	1	5	37
Lorne Duguid	LW	29	1	4	5	2
Alex Motter	C	23	1	4	5	4
Flash Hollett	D	6	1	2	3	2
Max Kaminsky	C	36	1	2	3	20
Gerry Shannon	LW	23	0	1	1	6
Tiny Thompson	G	48	0	1	1	0
Phil Besler	RW	8	0	0	0	0
Bob Blake	LW	12	0	0	0	0
Bob Davie	D	2	0	0	0	2
Woody Dumart	LW	1	0	0	0	0
Ed Finnigan	LW	3	0	0	0	0
Ray Getliffe	C/LW	1	0	0	0	2
Percy Jackson	G	1	0	0	0	0
Walter Jackson	LW	2	0	0	0	0
Bert McInenly	LW/D	3	0	0	0	0
Jack Portland	D	2	0	0	0	0
Jack Riley	C	8	0	0	0	0

Goaltending

Player	MIN	GP	W	L	T	GA	GAA	SO
Tiny Thompson	2930	48	22	20	6	82	1.68	10
Percy Jackson	40	1	0	0	0	1	1.50	0
Team:	2970	48	22	20	6	83	1.68	10

=== Playoffs ===
Scoring

Player	Pos	GP	G	A	Pts	PIM
Bill Cowley	C	2	2	1	3	2
Jim O'Neil	C/RW	2	1	1	2	4
Eddie Shore	D	2	1	1	2	12
Lorne Duguid	LW	2	1	0	1	2
Cooney Weiland	C	2	1	0	1	2
Dit Clapper	RW/D	2	0	1	1	0
Roger Jenkins	RW/D	2	0	1	1	2
Babe Siebert	LW/D	2	0	1	1	0
Red Beattie	LW	2	0	0	0	2
Ray Getliffe	C/LW	2	0	0	0	0
Ted Graham	D	2	0	0	0	0
Alex Motter	C	2	0	0	0	0
Paul Runge	C/LW	2	0	0	0	2
Charlie Sands	C/RW	2	0	0	0	0
Tiny Thompson	G	2	0	0	0	0

Goaltending

Player	MIN	GP	W	L	GA	GAA	SO
Tiny Thompson	120	2	1	1	8	4.00	1
Team:	120	2	1	1	8	4.00	1

Note:

Pos = Position;GP = Games played; G = Goals; A = Assists; Pts = Points; PIM = Penalty minutes; +/- = Plus/minus; PPG = Power-play goals; SHG = Short-handed goals; GWG = Game-winning goals
Pos = Position;GP = Games played; Min, TOI = Minutes played; W = Wins; L = Losses; T,T/OT = Ties; OTL = Overtime losses; GA = Goals-against; GAA = Goals-against average; SO = Shutouts; SA = Shots against; SV = Shots saved;SV% = Save percentage;

== See also ==
- 1935–36 NHL season
