= Gord Pettinger =

English-born Canadian ice hockey player

- Born: November 17, 1911 Harrogate, England, United Kingdom
- Died: May 24, 1986 (aged 74) Victoria, British Columbia, Canada
- Height: 6 ft 1 in (185 cm)
- Weight: 180 lb (82 kg; 12 st 12 lb)
- Position: Centre
- Shot: Left
- Played for: New York Rangers; Detroit Red Wings; Boston Bruins
- Playing career: 1930–1946

Gordon Robinson "Gosh" Pettinger (November 11, 1911 – May 24, 1986) was a Canadian professional ice hockey centre.

Pettinger was born in Harrogate, England and raised in Regina, Saskatchewan. He played eight seasons in the National Hockey League (NHL) for the New York Rangers, Detroit Red Wings and Boston Bruins between 1932 and 1940. Pettinger won the Stanley Cup four times with three teams: in 1933 with the Rangers, in 1936 and 1937 with the Red Wings, and in 1939 with the Bruins. He is one of 11 players to win the Cup with three or more teams. His brother Eric played in the NHL for several teams, including the Boston Bruins and the Toronto Maple Leafs.

== Career statistics ==
=== Regular season and playoffs ===
			Regular season					Playoffs
Season	Team	League	GP	G	A	Pts	PIM	GP	G	A	Pts	PIM
1928–29	Regina Pats	S-SJHL	6	5	1	6	2	—	—	—	—	—
1928–29	Regina Pats	M-Cup	—	—	—	—	—	6	6	0	6	4
1929–30	Regina Pats	S-SJHL	3	2	2	4	4	—	—	—	—	—
1929–30	Regina Pats	M-Cup	—	—	—	—	—	8	5	1	6	12
1930–31	Vancouver Lions	PCHL	33	5	5	10	10	4	0	1	1	0
1931–32	Bronx Tigers	Can-Am	39	14	18	32	34	2	0	2	2	6
1932–33	New York Rangers	NHL	34	1	2	3	18	8	0	0	0	0
1932–33	Springfield Indians	Can-Am	13	7	5	12	12	—	—	—	—	—
1933–34	Detroit Red Wings	NHL	48	3	14	17	14	7	1	0	1	2
1933–34	Detroit Olympics	IHL	1	0	0	0	0	—	—	—	—	—
1934–35	Detroit Red Wings	NHL	13	2	3	5	2	—	—	—	—	—
1934–35	London Tecumsehs	IHL	44	10	15	25	45	5	4	0	4	5
1935–36	Detroit Red Wings	NHL	30	8	7	15	6	7	2	2	4	0
1935–36	Detroit Olympics	IHL	18	9	16	25	10	—	—	—	—	—
1936–37	Detroit Red Wings	NHL	48	7	15	22	13	10	0	2	2	2
1937–38	Detroit Red Wings	NHL	13	1	3	4	4	—	—	—	—	—
1937–38	Boston Bruins	NHL	34	7	10	17	10	3	0	0	0	0
1938–39	Boston Bruins	NHL	48	11	13	24	8	12	1	1	2	7
1939–40	Boston Bruins	NHL	24	2	5	7	2	—	—	—	—	—
1939–40	Hershey Bears	AHL	29	9	12	21	0	5	1	1	2	4
1940–41	Hershey Bears	AHL	52	13	28	41	4	6	2	6	8	2
1941–42	Hershey Bears	AHL	56	12	38	50	8	10	2	8	10	2
1944–45	Hershey Bears	AHL	32	5	12	17	0	—	—	—	—	—
1944–45	Cleveland Barons	AHL	12	1	3	4	4	—	—	—	—	—
1945–46	Regina Capitals	WCSHL	8	2	6	8	0	—	—	—	—	—
1967–68	Port Huron Flags	IHL	37	11	26	37	25	—	—	—	—	—
NHL totals			292	42	72	114	77	47	4	5	9	11
