= John Sorrell (ice hockey) =

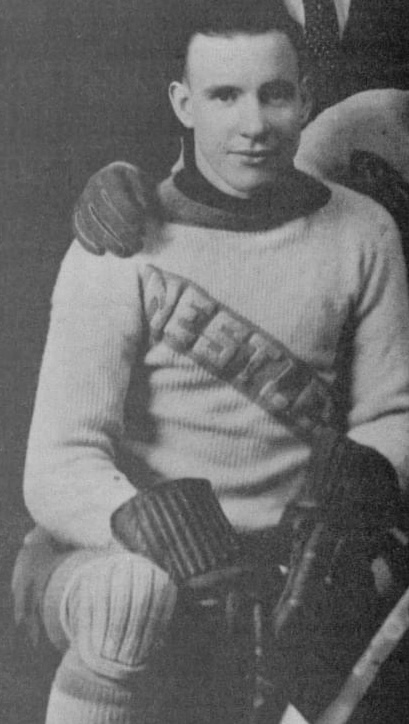
- John Sorrell while playing in Chesterville
- Born: January 16, 1906 Chesterville, Ontario, Canada
- Died: November 30, 1984 (aged 78) Indianapolis, Indiana, US
- Height: 5 ft 11 in (180 cm)
- Weight: 155 lb (70 kg; 11 st 1 lb)
- Position: Left wing
- Shot: Left
- Played for: Detroit Falcons/Red Wings; New York Americans
- Playing career: 1927–1945

John Arthur "Long John" Sorrell (January 16, 1906 — November 30, 1984) was a Canadian ice hockey left winger in the NHL playing for the Detroit Falcons (later renamed the Detroit Red Wings) and the New York Americans between 1930 and 1941. He later played for and coached the Indianapolis Capitals of the AHL, and retired in 1945. With the Red Wings he won the Stanley Cup twice, in 1936 and 1937.

== Personal life ==
Sorrell was born in Chesterville, Ontario on 16 January 1906 to John Sorrell (1880-1931) and Mary Lafleur (1881-1925). On 3 May 1928, John married his first wife, Florence Margaret Einberger, daughter of Martin Einberger and Mary Rappel, in Dundas County, Ontario, Canada. Florence died in 1943. On 8 September 1945, John married his second wife Gladys Maxine Galloway, daughter of Robert J. Galloway and Mellie V. Peacock, in Steuben County, Indiana.

Sorrell died on 30 November 1984 at his home in Indianapolis, Indiana. His cause of death was a heart attack due to lung cancer.

== Playing career ==
Sorrell played junior hockey for three different teams in three different leagues. In 1926 he was a young left winger for the Chesterville Colts of the Ontario Hockey Association and showed great promise. He was quickly noticed and in 1927 played forty games for the Quebec Beavers of the CAHL before being called up into the Canadian Professional Hockey League the following year for the Windsor Bulldogs. He was finally noticed by the NHL when the Montreal Canadiens signed him. He never played a game for Montreal, but was instead traded to the London Tecumsehs of the IHL on November 5, 1929. Sorrell continued to show promise and helped the Tecumsehs to a third-place finish in the IHL.

On November 10, 1930 he was traded to the Detroit Falcons, and finally found a place to call home for more than a single season. He would spend the next nine years with the Detroit club helping the team to win consecutive Stanley Cups in 1936 and 1937.

On February 13, 1938, Sorrell was traded for Hap Emms to the New York Americans where he would spend the rest of his NHL career. He retired from the league in the 1940–41 season, spending his remaining playing days in the AHL with both the Hershey Bears and Indianapolis Capitals, turning to coaching in the 1945–46 season.

== Career statistics ==
=== Regular season and playoffs ===
			Regular season					Playoffs
Season	Team	League	GP	G	A	Pts	PIM	GP	G	A	Pts	PIM
1926–27	Chesterville Colts	OHA Int	—	—	—	—	—	—	—	—	—	—
1927–28	Quebec Castors	Can-Am	40	7	3	10	27	6	1	0	1	2
1928–29	Windsor Bulldogs	Can-Pro	42	16	7	23	36	8	1	1	2	6
1929–30	London Panthers	IHL	42	31	13	44	26	2	0	0	0	0
1930–31	Detroit Falcons	NHL	39	9	7	16	10	—	—	—	—	—
1931–32	Detroit Falcons	NHL	48	8	5	13	22	2	1	0	1	0
1932–33	Detroit Red Wings	NHL	47	14	10	24	11	4	2	2	4	4
1933–34	Detroit Red Wings	NHL	47	21	10	31	8	8	0	2	2	0
1934–35	Detroit Red Wings	NHL	47	20	16	36	12	—	—	—	—	—
1934–35	Detroit Olympics	IHL	1	1	2	3	0	—	—	—	—	—
1935–36	Detroit Red Wings	NHL	48	13	15	28	8	7	3	4	7	0
1936–37	Detroit Red Wings	NHL	48	8	16	24	4	10	2	4	6	2
1937–38	Detroit Red Wings	NHL	23	3	7	10	0	—	—	—	—	—
1937–38	New York Americans	NHL	17	8	2	10	9	6	4	0	4	2
1938–39	New York Americans	NHL	48	13	9	22	10	2	0	0	0	0
1939–40	New York Americans	NHL	48	8	16	24	4	3	0	3	3	2
1940–41	New York Americans	NHL	30	2	6	8	2	—	—	—	—	—
1940–41	Springfield Indians	AHL	10	0	1	1	2	—	—	—	—	—
1940–41	Hershey Bears	AHL	10	1	6	7	14	10	1	2	3	10
1941–42	Hershey Bears	AHL	53	23	14	37	2	10	0	4	4	0
1942–43	Hershey Bears	AHL	49	24	28	52	8	6	4	2	6	0
1943–44	Indianapolis Capitals	AHL	51	16	22	38	6	5	4	4	8	2
1944–45	Indianapolis Capitals	AHL	56	21	21	42	8	5	2	0	2	2
NHL totals			490	127	119	246	100	42	12	15	27	10

== Awards and achievements ==
- Won the Stanley Cups two times with the Detroit Red Wings (1936 & 1937)
