= Gaston Leroux (ice hockey) =

Canadian ice hockey player

Gus Leroux
- Born: January 9, 1913; Montreal, Quebec, Canada
- Died: August 29, 1988 (aged 75); Quebec, Canada
- Height: 6 ft 0 in (183 cm)
- Weight: 195 lb (88 kg; 13 st 13 lb)
- Position: Defenceman
- Shot: Right
- Played for: Montreal Canadiens
- Playing career: 1930–1939

Joseph Arthur Gaston "Gus" Leroux (January 9, 1913 – August 29, 1988) was a Canadian professional ice hockey defenceman. He played two games in the National Hockey League for the Montreal Canadiens during the 1935–36 season. The rest of his career, which lasted from 1930 to 1939, was spent in the minor leagues. He was born in Montreal, Quebec.

== Career statistics ==
=== Regular season and playoffs ===
			Regular season					Playoffs
Season	Team	League	GP	G	A	Pts	PIM	GP	G	A	Pts	PIM
1930–31	Montreal Senior Canadiens	MCHL	7	0	0	0	2	—	—	—	—	—
1931–32	Montreal St. Francis Xavier	MCHL	—	—	—	—	—	—	—	—	—	—
1931–32	Montreal Nationale	MCHL	—	—	—	—	—	—	—	—	—	—
1932–33	Montreal Nationale	MCHL	—	—	—	—	—	—	—	—	—	—
1933–34	Quebec Castors	Can-Am	8	0	0	0	0	—	—	—	—	—
1933–34	Montreal LaFontaine Bleus	MCHL	14	4	2	6	11	—	—	—	—	—
1934–35	Cleveland Falcons	IHL	42	2	6	8	15	2	0	0	0	0
1935–36	Montreal Canadiens	NHL	2	0	0	0	0	—	—	—	—	—
1935–36	Windsor Bulldogs	IHL	12	1	1	2	2	7	0	0	0	0
1935–36	Springfield Indians	Can-Am	23	1	3	4	20	—	—	—	—	—
1936–37	Sherbrooke Red Raiders	QPHL	—	—	—	—	—	—	—	—	—	—
1937–38	Sherbrooke Red Raiders	QPHL	21	8	5	13	5	9	1	4	5	8
1938–39	Sherbrooke Red Raiders	QPHL	35	3	5	8	8	5	0	1	1	2
Can-Am totals			31	1	3	4	20	—	—	—	—	—
IHL totals			54	3	7	10	17	9	0	0	0	0
NHL totals			2	0	0	0	0	—	—	—	—	—
