= Art Chapman (ice hockey) =

Canadian ice hockey player

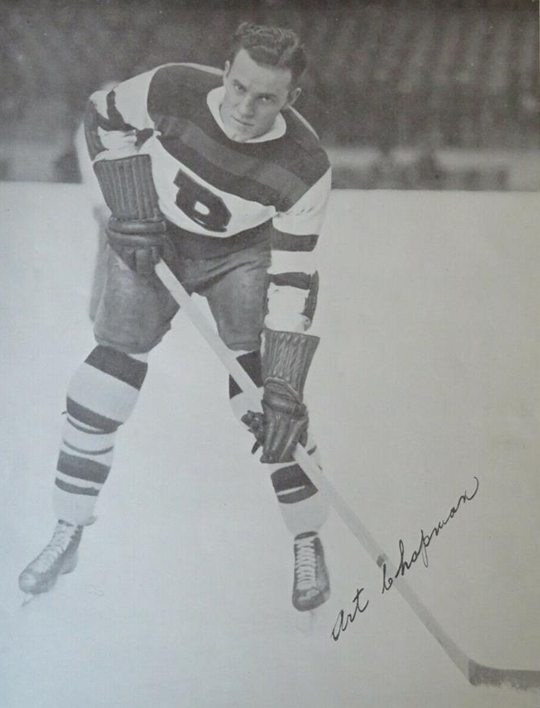
- Chapman with the Boston Bruins in 1933
- Born: May 29, 1905 Winnipeg, Manitoba, Canada
- Died: December 31, 1962 (aged 57) Los Angeles, California, U.S.
- Height: 5 ft 10 in (178 cm)
- Weight: 170 lb (77 kg; 12 st 2 lb)
- Position: Centre
- Shot: Left
- Played for: Boston Bruins; New York Americans
- Playing career: 1927–1944

John Arthur Chapman (May 29, 1905 – December 31, 1962) was a Canadian ice hockey forward. He was born in Winnipeg, Manitoba.

Chapman started his National Hockey League career with the Boston Bruins in 1930. He would also play for the New York Americans, retiring after the 1940 season to take up coaching duties for the team. In 1936–37, he was a member of the NHL All-Star team.

== Hockey career ==
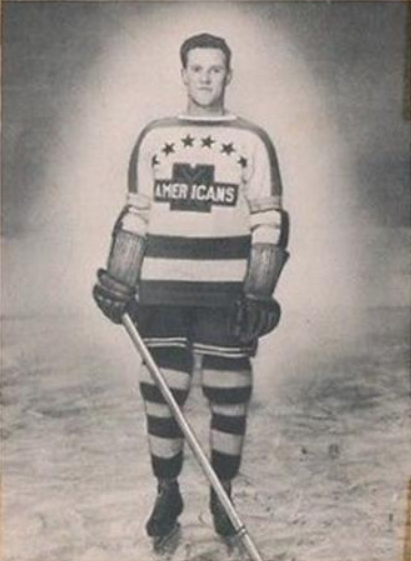
Chapman in 1939 card for New York Americans

Chapman was born in Winnipeg, Manitoba, Canada and played his first hockey with the Winnipeg Seniors in 1924. In 1925 Chapman joined the Port Arthur Bearcats and helped them win the Allan Cup in 1926. He turned pro with the Springfield Indians of the Canadian-American League in 1927, and was sold to the Boston Bruins in 1928. In 1933 Chapman joined the New York Americans in 1933.

Chapman retired from playing hockey after the 1939–40 season, and went on to serve as head coach of the New York Americans from 1940 to 1942, the Buffalo Bisons of the American Hockey League from 1943 to 1945, and the Vancouver Canucks of the WHL from 1957 to 1958. He became General Manager of the Dunn-Edwards Western Show Corporation and promoted shows in Long Beach, California, for the Long Beach area.

=== 1937 All-Star Game ===
Chapman played on the first line with Lorne Carr. In 1935–36 with Art leading in assist and rookie Dave "Sweeney" Schriner with the most goals, went on to do the same in the 1936-37 season. Both Art and Sweeny played in the second All-Star game in NHL history in 1937 (NHL.com)

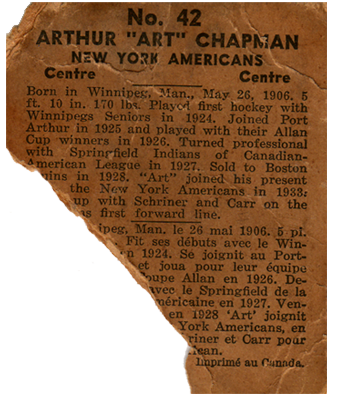
1937–38 V356 Worldwide Gum Trading Card

== Awards and achievements ==
- Allan Cup Championship (1926)
- NHL second All-Star team (1936–37)
- "Honoured Member" of the Manitoba Hockey Hall of Fame
- Calder Cup Champion As Head Coach with the Buffalo Bisons (AHL) (1943–44)
- Lester Patrick Cup Champion As Head Coach with the Vancouver Canucks (WHL) (1957–58)

== Career statistics ==
=== Regular season and playoffs ===
			Regular season					Playoffs
Season	Team	League	GP	G	A	Pts	PIM	GP	G	A	Pts	PIM
1922–23	University of Manitoba	MHL-Sr.	8	8	2	10	2	—	—	—	—	—
1923–24	Winnipeg Tigers	WJrHL	—	—	—	—	—	—	—	—	—	—
1923–24	Winnipeg Tigers	MHL-Sr.	1	1	0	1	0	—	—	—	—	—
1924–25	Winnipeg Falcons	MHL-Sr.	8	5	0	5	0	—	—	—	—	—
1925–26	Port Arthur Ports	TBSHL	19	13	2	15	17	3	0	0	0	0
1925–26	Port Arthur Ports	Al-Cup	—	—	—	—	—	6	3	1	4	6
1926–27	Port Arthur Ports	TBSHL	20	19	10	29	16	2	0	0	0	0
1927–28	Springfield Indians	Can-Am	39	14	5	19	6	4	1	1	2	6
1928–29	Providence Reds	Can-Am	39	14	14	28	5	6	0	1	1	4
1929–30	Providence Reds	Can-Am	39	26	19	45	22	3	5	0	5	6
1930–31	Boston Bruins	NHL	44	7	7	14	22	5	0	1	1	7
1931–32	Boston Bruins	NHL	48	11	14	25	18	—	—	—	—	—
1932–33	Boston Bruins	NHL	46	3	6	9	19	5	0	0	0	2
1933–34	Boston Bruins	NHL	21	2	5	7	7	—	—	—	—	—
1933–34	New York Americans	NHL	25	3	7	10	8	—	—	—	—	—
1934–35	New York Americans	NHL	47	9	34	43	4	—	—	—	—	—
1935–36	New York Americans	NHL	48	10	28	38	14	5	0	3	3	0
1936–37	New York Americans	NHL	43	8	23	31	36	—	—	—	—	—
1937–38	New York Americans	NHL	45	2	27	29	8	6	0	1	1	0
1938–39	New York Americans	NHL	45	3	19	22	2	2	0	0	0	0
1939–40	New York Americans	NHL	26	4	6	10	2	3	1	0	1	0
1942–43	Buffalo Bisons	AHL	45	9	19	28	12	—	—	—	—	—
1943–44	Buffalo Bisons	AHL	1	0	0	0	0	—	—	—	—	—
NHL totals			438	62	176	238	140	26	1	5	6	9

=== Coaching career ===
Season	Team	League	Regular season						Postseason
Season	Team	League	G	W	L	T	Pct	Division rank	Result
1940–41	New York Americans	NHL	48	8	29	11	.281	7th overall	Did not quality
1941–42	Brooklyn Americans	NHL	48	16	29	3	.365	7th overall	Did not qualify

Preceded by Red Dutton	Head coach of the New York/Brooklyn Americans; 1940–42	Succeeded by Position abolished
