= 1935–36 NHL season =

Professional ice hockey league season

- League: National Hockey League
- Sport: Ice hockey
- Duration: November 7, 1935 – April 11, 1936
- Games: 48
- Teams: 8

Regular season
- Season champions: Detroit Red Wings
- Season MVP: Eddie Shore (Bruins)
- Top scorer: Sweeney Schriner (Americans)
- Canadian Division champions: Montreal Maroons
- American Division champions: Detroit Red Wings

Stanley Cup
- Champions: Detroit Red Wings
- Runners-up: Toronto Maple Leafs

NHL seasons
- ← 1934–35 1936–37 →

The 1935–36 NHL season was the 19th season of the National Hockey League (NHL). The St. Louis Eagles dropped out of the league, leaving eight teams. The Detroit Red Wings were the Stanley Cup winners as they beat the Toronto Maple Leafs three games to one in the Stanley Cup Finals.

== League business ==
Prior to the season, the St. Louis Eagles franchise owners asked the league for permission to suspend operations for a year and then relocate back to Ottawa, however the league denied the requests. On October 15, 1935, the NHL bought back the franchise and players contracts for $40,000 and suspended operations. Chicago would not participate in the dispersal draft, while St. Louis would not have another NHL team until 1967.

During the season, the New York Americans were reported in financial trouble and were up for sale. Leo Dandurand, who had sold his interest in the Montreal Canadiens, was interested as was Joseph Cattarinich. Cattarinich said he would buy the team if the price was right. Later it was announced there would be no deal.

This was the first year the Boston Bruins switched from brown and gold to their now-familiar black and gold uniforms, while also placing the number on the front instead of the block B, which was moved to smaller B's on the shoulders.

== Regular season ==
Howie Morenz played badly for Chicago and incurred the wrath of Chicago owner Frederic McLaughlin. He was subsequently traded to the New York Rangers.

This was the year of Detroit. They finished first in the American Division. The Montreal Maroons finished first in the Canadian Division, but fans were starting to stay away from games they played, which worried now team president, manager and coach Tommy Gorman. At one point, Lionel Conacher had to run the team when Gorman experienced health and nervous problems. At .500 at mid-season, they traded Toe Blake for Lorne Chabot, owned by the Canadiens after being suspended by Chicago and refusing demotion to the minors, and the team began to win with Chabot in the net.

=== Final standings ===
American Division
| | GP | W | L | T | GF | GA | PTS |
|---|---|---|---|---|---|---|---|
| **Detroit Red Wings** | 48 | 24 | 16 | 8 | 124 | 103 | 56 |
| **Boston Bruins** | 48 | 22 | 20 | 6 | 92 | 83 | 50 |
| **Chicago Black Hawks** | 48 | 21 | 19 | 8 | 93 | 92 | 50 |
| New York Rangers | 48 | 19 | 17 | 12 | 91 | 96 | 50 |

Canadian Division
| | GP | W | L | T | GF | GA | PTS |
|---|---|---|---|---|---|---|---|
| **Montreal Maroons** | 48 | 22 | 16 | 10 | 114 | 106 | 54 |
| **Toronto Maple Leafs** | 48 | 23 | 19 | 6 | 126 | 106 | 52 |
| **New York Americans** | 48 | 16 | 25 | 7 | 109 | 122 | 39 |
| Montreal Canadiens | 48 | 11 | 26 | 11 | 82 | 123 | 33 |

Note: W = Wins, L = Losses, T = Ties, GF = Goals For, GA = Goals Against, Pts = Points
Teams that qualified for the playoffs are highlighted in bold.

== Playoffs ==
=== Playoff bracket ===
The top three teams in each division qualified for the playoffs. The two division winners met in a best-of-five Stanley Cup semifinal series. The divisional second-place teams and third-place teams played off in a two-game total-goals series to determine the participants for the other two-game total-goals semifinal series. The semifinal winners then played in a best-of-five Stanley Cup Finals.

This was the final year that the league used a two-game total-goals series, replacing them with best-of-three formats the following year.

First round
C2 | Toronto | 8G
A2 | Boston | 6G
C3 | NY Americans | 7G
A3 | Chicago | 5G

Semifinals
C1 | Mtl Maroons | 0
A1 | Detroit | 3
C2 | Toronto | 2
C3 | NY Americans | 1

Final
A1 | Detroit | 3
C2 | Toronto | 1

=== Quarterfinals ===
==== (C2) Toronto Maple Leafs vs. (A2) Boston Bruins ====
| March 24 | Toronto Maple Leafs | 0–3 | Boston Bruins | Boston Garden | Recap |
| No scoring | | First period | No scoring |
| No scoring | | Second period | 02:40 – pp – Jim O'Neil (1); 13:28 – pp – Eddie Shore (1) |
| No scoring | | Third period | 08:58 – Lorne Duguid (1) |
| George Hainsworth | | Goalie stats | Tiny Thompson |

| March 26 | Boston Bruins | 3–8 | Toronto Maple Leafs | Maple Leaf Gardens | Recap |
| Bill Cowley (1) – 01:36 | | First period | No scoring |
| Bill Cowley (2) – 19:48 | | Second period | 07:25 – pp – King Clancy (1); 07:55 – pp – Charlie Conacher (1); 11:35 – Red Horner (1); 16:55 – pp – Charlie Conacher (2); 17:58 – pp – Busher Jackson (1); 19:13 – Buzz Boll (1) |
| Cooney Weiland (1) – 12:02 | | Third period | 10:58 – Charlie Conacher (3); 12:53 – Buzz Boll (2) |
| Tiny Thompson | | Goalie stats | George Hainsworth |

| Toronto won series on total goals 8–6 |

==== (A3) Chicago Black Hawks vs. (C3) New York Americans ====
| March 24 | Chicago Black Hawks | 0–3 | New York Americans | Madison Square Garden III | Recap |
| No scoring | | First period | 01:55 – Sweeney Schriner (1); 16:40 – pp – Sweeney Schriner (2) |
| No scoring | | Second period | No scoring |
| No scoring | | Third period | 09:52 – Lorne Carr (1) |
| Mike Karakas 27 saves / 30 shots | | Goalie stats | Roy Worters 24 saves / 24 shots |

| March 26 | New York Americans | 4–5 | Chicago Black Hawks | Chicago Stadium | Recap |
| Harry Oliver (1) – 11:55; Joe Jerwa (1) – 12:26 | | First period | 10:30 – Mush March (1) |
| Eddie Wiseman (1) – 19:42 | | Second period | 15:45 – pp – Earl Seibert (1); 18:58 – pp – Mush March (2) |
| Sweeney Schriner (3) – 15:30 | | Third period | 16:18 – Doc Romnes (1); 18:22 – Earl Seibert (2) |
| Roy Worters | | Goalie stats | Mike Karakas |

| New York won series on total goals 7–5 |

=== Semifinals ===
==== (A1) Detroit Red Wings vs. (C1) Montreal Maroons ====
The first game of the Maroons-Red Wings series set a record for the longest game in Stanley Cup playoff history, as well as the longest ice hockey game ever played. The game began at 8:30 p.m. at the Forum in Montreal, and ended at 2:25 a.m. The game was scoreless until the sixth overtime, when Mud Bruneteau scored on Maroon goaltender Lorne Chabot to win the game. Normie Smith shut out the Maroons in the next game, and the Red Wings then beat the Maroons to win the series.

| March 24 | Detroit Red Wings | 1–0 | 6OT | Montreal Maroons | Montreal Forum | Recap |
| No scoring | | First period | | No scoring |
| No scoring | | Second period | | No scoring |
| No scoring | | Third period | | No scoring |
| Mud Bruneteau (1) – 16:30 | | Sixth overtime period | | No scoring |
| Normie Smith 92 saves / 92 shots | | Goalie stats | | Lorne Chabot 65 saves / 66 shots |

| March 26 | Detroit Red Wings | 3–0 | Montreal Maroons | Montreal Forum | Recap |
| No scoring | | First period | No scoring |
| No scoring | | Second period | No scoring |
| Syd Howe (1) – pp – 09:48; Herbie Lewis (1) – sh – 16:58; Larry Aurie (1) – 19:20 | | Third period | No scoring |
| Normie Smith | | Goalie stats | Lorne Chabot |

| March 29 | Montreal Maroons | 1–2 | Detroit Red Wings | Olympia Stadium | Recap |
| Gus Marker (1) – 12:02 | | First period | No scoring |
| No scoring | | Second period | 14:00 – John Sorrell (1) |
| No scoring | | Third period | 04:08 – Ralph Bowman (1) |
| Lorne Chabot | | Goalie stats | Normie Smith |

| Detroit won series 3–0 |

==== (C2) Toronto Maple Leafs vs. (C3) New York Americans ====
| March 28 | New York Americans | 1–3 | Toronto Maple Leafs | Maple Leaf Gardens | Recap |
| No scoring | | First period | No scoring |
| Eddie Wiseman (2) – 00:30 | | Second period | No scoring |
| No scoring | | Third period | 06:22 – Buzz Boll (3); 06:56 – Busher Jackson (2); 12:17 – Buzz Boll (4) |
| Roy Worters | | Goalie stats | George Hainsworth |

| March 31 | Toronto Maple Leafs | 0–1 | New York Americans | Madison Square Garden III | Recap |
| No scoring | | First period | No scoring |
| No scoring | | Second period | 16:15 – Joe Jerwa (2) |
| No scoring | | Third period | No scoring |
| George Hainsworth | | Goalie stats | Roy Worters |

| April 2 | New York Americans | 1–3 | Toronto Maple Leafs | Maple Leaf Gardens | Recap |
| Nels Stewart (1) – 15:24 | | First period | 14:26 – Busher Jackson (3) |
| No scoring | | Second period | No scoring |
| No scoring | | Third period | 12:51 – Bill Thoms (1); 18:33 – King Clancy (2) |
| Roy Worters | | Goalie stats | George Hainsworth |

| Toronto won series 2–1 |

=== Stanley Cup Finals ===
| April 5 | Toronto Maple Leafs | 1–3 | Detroit Red Wings | Olympia Stadium | Recap |
| Buzz Boll (5) – 12:15 | | First period | 04:53 – sh – Bucko McDonald (1); 05:37 – Syd Howe (2); 12:05 – Wally Kilrea (1) |
| No scoring | | Second period | No scoring |
| No scoring | | Third period | No scoring |
| George Hainsworth | | Goalie stats | Normie Smith |

| April 7 | Toronto Maple Leafs | 4–9 | Detroit Red Wings | Olympia Stadium | Recap |
| Buzz Boll (6) – 12:35 | | First period | 01:30 – Wally Kilrea (2); 04:25 – Marty Barry (1); 10:05 – pp – Herbie Lewis (2); 16:55 – Bucko McDonald (2) |
| Joe Primeau (1) – 14:00 | | Second period | 07:15 – pp – John Sorrell (2); 09:10 – Gord Pettinger (1) |
| Bill Thoms (2) – 09:40; Bob Davidson (1) – 16:10 | | Third period | 07:30 – John Sorrell (3); 12:05 – Gord Pettinger; 17:15 – Bucko McDonald (3) |
| George Hainsworth | | Goalie stats | Normie Smith |

| April 9 | Detroit Red Wings | 3–4 | OT | Toronto Maple Leafs | Maple Leaf Gardens | Recap |
| Ralph Bowman (2) – 09:23 | | First period | | No scoring |
| Mud Bruneteau (2) – 01:05 | | Second period | | No scoring |
| Syd Howe (3) – 11:15 | | Third period | | 13:09 – Joe Primeau (2); 15:20 – Pep Kelly (1); 19:19 – Pep Kelly (2) |
| No scoring | | First overtime period | | 00:30 – Buzz Boll (7) |
| Normie Smith | | Goalie stats | | George Hainsworth |

| April 11 | Detroit Red Wings | 3–2 | Toronto Maple Leafs | Maple Leaf Gardens | Recap |
| No scoring | | First period | 15:10 – Joe Primeau (3) |
| Ebbie Goodfellow (1) – 09:55; Marty Barry (2) – 10:38 | | Second period | No scoring |
| Pete Kelly (1) – 09:45 | | Third period | 10:57 – Bill Thoms (3) |
| Normie Smith | | Goalie stats | George Hainsworth |

| Detroit won series 3–1 |

== Awards ==
Eddie Shore won his second consecutive Hart trophy. Frank Boucher's run of seven Lady Byng trophy awards came to an end as Doc Romnes won the award. Tiny Thompson won the Vezina trophy for the third time in his career.

| Hart Trophy: (Most valuable player) | Eddie Shore, Boston Bruins |
| Lady Byng Trophy: (Excellence and sportsmanship) | Doc Romnes, Chicago Black Hawks |
| O'Brien Cup: (Canadian Division champion) | Montreal Maroons |
| Prince of Wales Trophy: (American Division champion) | Detroit Red Wings |
| Rookie of the Year: (Best first-year player) | Mike Karakas, Chicago Black Hawks |
| Vezina Trophy:: (Fewest goals allowed) | Tiny Thompson, Boston Bruins |

=== All-Star teams ===
| First Team | Position | Second Team |
|---|---|---|
| Tiny Thompson, Boston Bruins | G | Wilf Cude, Montreal Canadiens |
| Eddie Shore, Boston Bruins | D | Earl Seibert, Chicago Black Hawks |
| Babe Siebert, Boston Bruins | D | Ebbie Goodfellow, Detroit Red Wings |
| Hooley Smith, Montreal Maroons | C | Bill Thoms, Toronto Maple Leafs |
| Charlie Conacher, Toronto Maple Leafs | RW | Cecil Dillon, New York Rangers |
| Sweeney Schriner, New York Americans | LW | Paul Thompson, Chicago Black Hawks |
| Lester Patrick, New York Rangers | Coach | Tommy Gorman, Montreal Maroons |

== Player statistics ==
=== Scoring leaders ===
Note: GP = Games played, G = Goals, A = Assists, PTS = Points, PIM = Penalties in minutes

| Player | Team | GP | G | A | PTS | PIM |
|---|---|---|---|---|---|---|
| Sweeney Schriner | New York Americans | 48 | 19 | 26 | 45 | 8 |
| Marty Barry | Detroit Red Wings | 48 | 21 | 19 | 40 | 16 |
| Paul Thompson | Chicago Black Hawks | 45 | 17 | 23 | 40 | 19 |
| Charlie Conacher | Toronto Maple Leafs | 44 | 23 | 15 | 38 | 74 |
| Bill Thoms | Toronto Maple Leafs | 48 | 23 | 15 | 38 | 29 |
| Hooley Smith | Montreal Maroons | 47 | 19 | 19 | 38 | 75 |
| Doc Romnes | Chicago Black Hawks | 48 | 13 | 25 | 38 | 6 |
| Art Chapman | New York Americans | 47 | 10 | 28 | 38 | 14 |
| Herbie Lewis | Detroit Red Wings | 45 | 14 | 23 | 37 | 25 |
| Baldy Northcott | Montreal Maroons | 48 | 15 | 21 | 36 | 41 |

Source: NHL.

== Coaches ==
=== American Division ===
- Boston Bruins: Frank Patrick
- Chicago Black Hawks: Clem Loughlin
- Detroit Red Wings: Jack Adams
- New York Rangers: Lester Patrick

=== Canadian Division ===
- Montreal Canadiens: Sylvio Mantha
- Montreal Maroons: Tommy Gorman
- New York Americans: Rosie Helmer
- Toronto Maple Leafs: Dick Irvin

== Debuts ==
The following is a list of players of note who played their first NHL game in 1935–36 (listed with their first team, asterisk(*) marks debut in playoffs):

- Ray Getliffe, Boston Bruins
- Woody Dumart, Boston Bruins
- Mike Karakas, Chicago Black Hawks
- Mud Bruneteau, Detroit Red Wings
- Alex Shibicky, New York Rangers
- Babe Pratt, New York Rangers
- Neil Colville, New York Rangers
- Phil Watson, New York Rangers
- Reg Hamilton, Toronto Maple Leafs

== Last games ==
The following is a list of players of note that played their last game in the NHL in 1935–36 (listed with their last team):

- Joe Primeau, Toronto Maple Leafs

== See also ==
- 1935–36 NHL transactions
- List of Stanley Cup champions
- Ice hockey at the 1936 Winter Olympics
- 1935 in sports
- 1936 in sports
