= Buzz Boll =

Canadian ice hockey player (1911–1990)

- Born: March 6, 1911 Fillmore, Saskatchewan, Canada
- Died: January 23, 1990 (aged 78) Regina, Saskatchewan, Canada
- Height: 5 ft 10 in (178 cm)
- Weight: 166 lb (75 kg; 11 st 12 lb)
- Position: Left wing
- Shot: Left
- Played for: Toronto Maple Leafs; New York Americans; Brooklyn Americans; Boston Bruins
- Playing career: 1931–1944

Frank Thorman "Buzz" Boll (March 6, 1911 – January 23, 1990) was a Canadian professional ice hockey left winger who played 11 seasons in the National Hockey League for the Toronto Maple Leafs, New York Americans, Brooklyn Americans and Boston Bruins between 1933 and 1944. He was born in Fillmore, Saskatchewan.

== Playing career ==
Frank Boll played for the Toronto Maple Leafs from 1933–34 to 1938–39. He then played two seasons for the New York Americans and one for the Brooklyn Americans when the franchise was renamed for the start of the 1941–42 season. He finished his NHL career playing for the Boston Bruins in 1942–43 and 1943–44.

== Career statistics ==
=== Regular season and playoffs ===
			Regular season					Playoffs
Season	Team	League	GP	G	A	Pts	PIM	GP	G	A	Pts	PIM
1928–29	Weyburn Wanderers	S-SJHL	—	—	—	—	—	—	—	—	—	—
1928–29	Weyburn Wanderers	M-Cup	—	—	—	—	—	3	0	2	2	0
1929–30	Regina Pats	S-SJHL	2	1	0	1	0	8	3	3	6	12
1929–30	Regina Pats	M-Cup	—	—	—	—	—	5	3	3	6	12
1930–31	Weyburn Beavers	S-SSHL	20	12	4	16	16	—	—	—	—	—
1931–32	Toronto Marlboros	OHA Sr	20	14	4	18	17	2	1	1	2	2
1931–32	Syracuse Stars	IHL	9	3	0	3	4	—	—	—	—	—
1932–33	Syracuse Stars	IHL	38	9	6	15	16	6	1	2	3	2
1932–33	Toronto Maple Leafs	NHL	—	—	—	—	—	1	0	0	0	0
1933–34	Toronto Maple Leafs	NHL	42	12	8	20	21	5	0	0	0	9
1934–35	Toronto Maple Leafs	NHL	47	14	4	18	4	6	0	0	0	0
1935–36	Toronto Maple Leafs	NHL	44	15	13	28	14	9	7	3	10	2
1936–37	Toronto Maple Leafs	NHL	25	6	3	9	12	2	0	0	0	0
1937–38	Toronto Maple Leafs	NHL	44	14	11	25	18	7	0	0	0	2
1938–39	Toronto Maple Leafs	NHL	11	0	0	0	0	—	—	—	—	—
1938–39	Syracuse Stars	IAHL	7	2	2	4	6	—	—	—	—	—
1939–40	New York Americans	NHL	47	5	10	15	18	1	0	0	0	0
1940–41	New York Americans	NHL	47	12	14	26	16	—	—	—	—	—
1941–42	Brooklyn Americans	NHL	48	11	15	26	23	—	—	—	—	—
1942–43	Boston Bruins	NHL	43	25	27	52	20	—	—	—	—	—
1943–44	Boston Bruins	NHL	39	19	25	44	2	—	—	—	—	—
NHL totals			437	133	130	263	148	31	7	3	10	13
