= Bill Miller (ice hockey) =

Canadian ice hockey player

- Born: August 1, 1908 Campbellton, New Brunswick, Canada
- Died: June 12, 1986 (aged 77)
- Height: 6 ft 0 in (183 cm)
- Weight: 160 lb (73 kg; 11 st 6 lb)
- Position: Centre/Defence
- Shot: Left
- Played for: Montreal Canadiens
- Playing career: 1926–1937

Robert William Miller (August 1, 1908 — June 12, 1986) was a Canadian ice hockey centre and defenceman who played 95 games in the National Hockey League.

== Career ==
Between 1934 and 1937, Miller played for the Montreal Maroons and Montreal Canadiens. The rest of his career, which lasted from 1926 to 1937, was spent in senior leagues. He won the Stanley Cup with the Maroons in 1935.

== Career statistics ==
=== Regular season and playoffs ===
			Regular season					Playoffs
Season	Team	League	GP	G	A	Pts	PIM	GP	G	A	Pts	PIM
1923–24	Campbellton Rink Rats	NNBHL	—	—	—	—	—	—	—	—	—	—
1924–25	Campbellton Tigers	NNBHL	6	5	2	7	2	—	—	—	—	—
1925–26	Campbellton Tigers	NNBHL	4	3	1	4	2	1	2	1	3	0
1925–26	Campbellton Tigers	Al-Cup	—	—	—	—	—	2	0	0	0	0
1926–27	Mount Allison University	MIHC	2	4	0	4	3	—	—	—	—	—
1926–27	Campbellton Tigers	NNBHL	2	2	0	2	0	—	—	—	—	—
1927–28	Mount Allison University	MIHC	2	5	0	5	0	—	—	—	—	—
1927–28	Campbellton Tigers	NNBHL	3	5	0	5	0	—	—	—	—	—
1928–29	Mount Allison University	MIHC	28	13	2	15	8	—	—	—	—	—
1929–30	Mount Allison University	MIHC	2	2	0	2	—	—	—	—	—	—
1929–30	Campbellton Tigers	Exhib	3	3	1	4	2	—	—	—	—	—
1930–31	Campbellton Tigers	NNBHL	11	28	11	39	6	—	—	—	—	—
1930–31	Campbellton Tigers	Al-Cup	—	—	—	—	—	5	8	3	11	2
1931–32	Campbellton Tigers	MSHL	23	19	8	27	14	2	0	0	0	0
1931–32	Fredericton Capitals	NBSHL	5	0	3	3	2	—	—	—	—	—
1932–33	Moncton Hawks	MSHL	23	5	0	5	0	5	1	1	2	0
1932–33	Moncton Hawks	Al-Cup	—	—	—	—	—	8	1	6	7	4
1933–34	Moncton Hawks	MSHL	41	8	19	27	30	3	1	5	6	0
1933–34	Moncton Hawks	Al-Cup	—	—	—	—	—	12	9	7	16	4
1934–35	Montreal Maroons	NHL	22	3	0	3	2	7	0	0	0	0
1934–35	Moncton Hawks	MSHL	20	17	5	22	4	3	5	2	7	0
1934–35	Moncton Hawks	BIG-3	4	2	1	3	2	—	—	—	—	—
1935–36	New Haven Eagles	Can-Am	11	0	0	0	0	—	—	—	—	—
1935–36	Montreal Maroons	NHL	8	0	0	0	0	—	—	—	—	—
1935–36	Montreal Canadiens	NHL	15	1	2	3	2	—	—	—	—	—
1936–37	Montreal Canadiens	NHL	48	3	1	4	12	5	0	0	0	)
NHL totals			95	7	3	10	16	12	0	0	0	0
