= Lorne Carr =

Canadian ice hockey player (1910–2007)

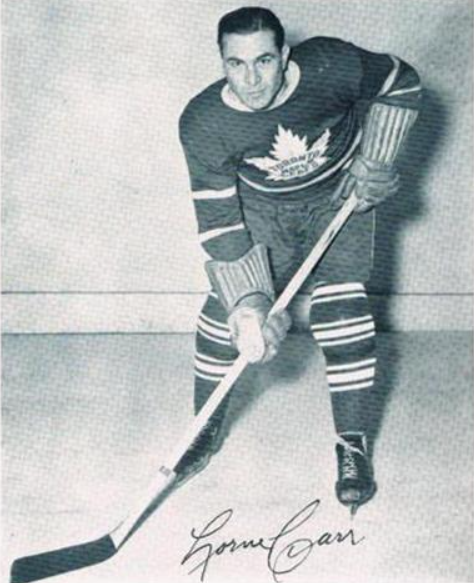
- Carr, c. 1940s
- Born: July 2, 1910 Stoughton, Saskatchewan, Canada
- Died: June 9, 2007 (aged 96) Calgary, Alberta, Canada
- Height: 5 ft 9 in (175 cm)
- Weight: 160 lb (73 kg; 11 st 6 lb)
- Position: Right wing
- Shot: Right
- Played for: New York Rangers; New York Americans; Toronto Maple Leafs
- Playing career: 1933–1946

Lorne William Bell Carr (July 2, 1910 – June 9, 2007) was a Canadian professional ice hockey player who played in the National Hockey League with the New York Rangers, New York Americans, and Toronto Maple Leafs between 1933 and 1946. He won the Stanley Cup twice with Toronto, in 1942 and 1945.

== Profession career ==
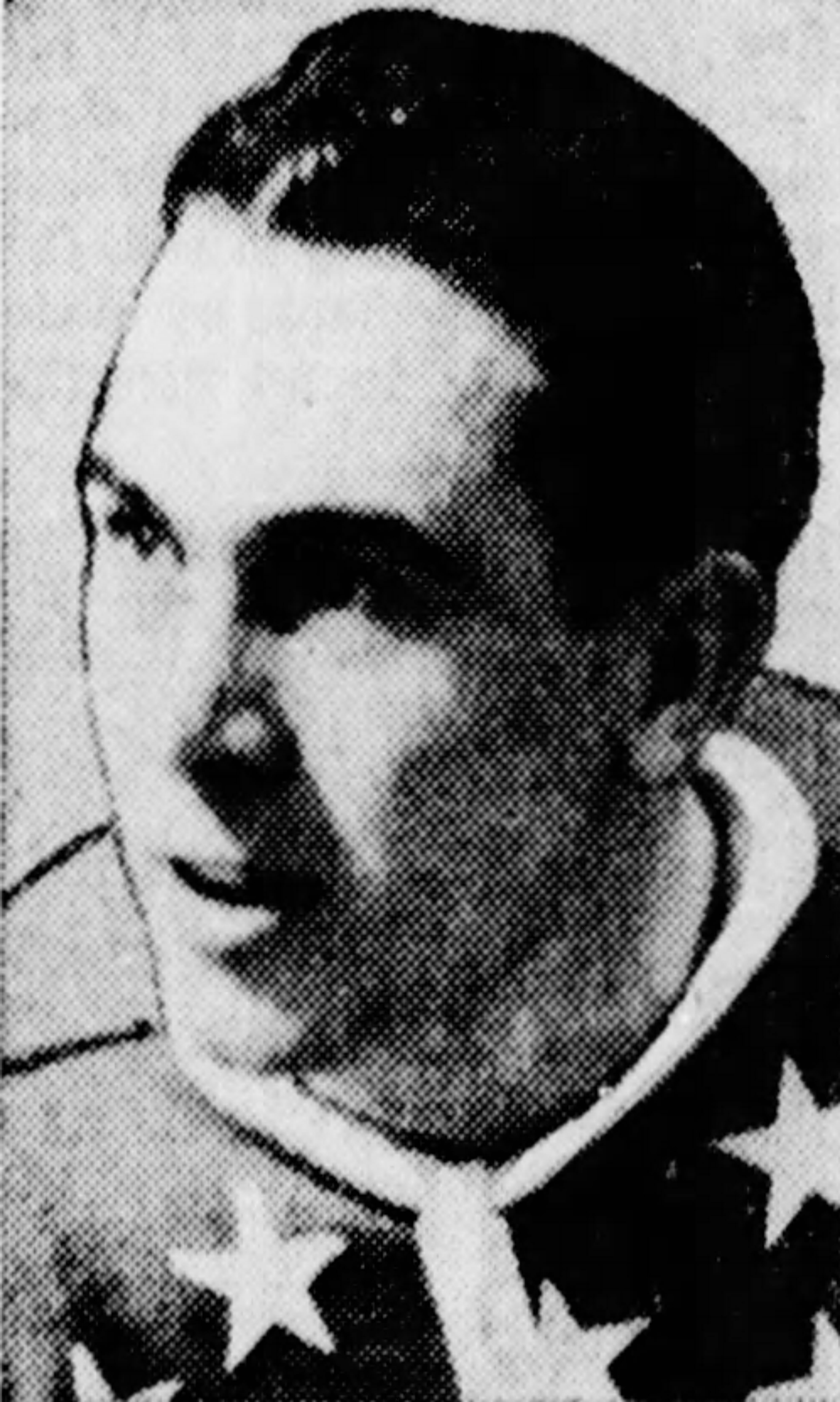
Carr in 1946 photo

Carr began his career in 1930 with the Vancouver Lions of the Pacific Coast Hockey League. He next played for the Buffalo Bisons of the International Hockey League. In 1934, Carr signed with the New York Rangers. After one season with the Rangers, Carr signed with the rival New York Americans, with whom he played for the following seven seasons.

In 1941, Carr was traded to the Toronto Maple Leafs for Red Heron, Nick Knott, Gus Marker and cash. It was with Toronto that he enjoyed his most success as a player. In 1942 he won his first Stanley Cup Championship, when his team, down three games to zero, won four straight against the Detroit Red Wings in the Stanley Cup Finals, winning the championship. Carr played another four seasons with the Maple Leafs, winning a second Stanley Cup Championship in 1945. He ended his playing career after the 1946 season.

== Post-playing career ==
Following his retirement, Carr moved to Calgary, Alberta, and opened the Amylorne Motel. The motel featured an 18-hole golf course and a driving range. He also co-owned a Calgary poolroom with Calgary native and former New York American Fred Hergerts.

== Career statistics ==
=== Regular season and playoffs ===
			Regular season					Playoffs
Season	Team	League	GP	G	A	Pts	PIM	GP	G	A	Pts	PIM
1928–29	Calgary Canadians	CCJHL	3	4	2	6	0	4	6	0	6	0
1928–29	Calgary Canadians	M-Cup	—	—	—	—	—	9	16	1	17	4
1929–30	Calgary Canadians	CCJHL	—	—	—	—	—	2	0	0	0	0
1929–30	Calgary Canadians	M-Cup	—	—	—	—	—	7	7	3	10	2
1930–31	Vancouver Lions	PCHL	32	5	4	9	2	4	0	0	0	0
1931–32	Buffalo Bisons	IHL	40	5	9	14	10	6	2	0	2	4
1932–33	Buffalo Bisons	IHL	44	22	18	40	13	6	2	1	3	4
1933–34	New York Rangers	NHL	14	0	0	0	0	—	—	—	—	—
1933–34	Philadelphia Arrows	Can-Am	9	4	2	6	0	—	—	—	—	—
1933–34	Syracuse Stars	IHL	18	8	4	12	6	6	0	1	1	2
1934–35	New York Americans	NHL	48	17	14	31	14	—	—	—	—	—
1935–36	New York Americans	NHL	44	8	10	18	4	5	1	1	2	0
1936–37	New York Americans	NHL	48	18	16	34	22	—	—	—	—	—
1937–38	New York Americans	NHL	48	16	7	23	12	6	3	1	4	2
1938–39	New York Americans	NHL	46	19	18	37	16	2	0	0	0	0
1939–40	New York Americans	NHL	48	8	17	25	17	3	0	0	0	0
1940–41	New York Americans	NHL	48	13	19	32	10	—	—	—	—	—
1941–42	Toronto Maple Leafs	NHL	47	16	17	33	4	13	3	2	5	6
1942–43	Toronto Maple Leafs	NHL	50	27	33	60	15	6	1	2	3	0
1943–44	Toronto Maple Leafs	NHL	50	36	38	74	9	5	0	1	1	0
1944–45	Toronto Maple Leafs	NHL	47	21	25	46	7	13	2	2	4	5
1945–46	Toronto Maple Leafs	NHL	42	5	8	13	2	—	—	—	—	—
NHL totals			580	204	222	426	132	53	10	9	19	13
