= Joe Jerwa =

Polish-Canadian ice hockey defenseman

- Born: 20 January 1907 Warsaw, Congress Poland, Russian Empire
- Died: 11 April 1983 (aged 76) Coquitlam, British Columbia, Canada
- Height: 6 ft 2 in (188 cm)
- Weight: 185 lb (84 kg; 13 st 3 lb)
- Position: Defence
- Shot: Left
- Played for: New York Rangers; Boston Bruins; New York Americans
- Playing career: 1928–1942

Joseph Charles Jerwa (22 January 1907 – 11 April 1983) was a Polish-born Canadian professional ice hockey defenceman who played eight seasons in the National Hockey League (NHL) for the New York Rangers, Boston Bruins and New York Americans between 1930 and 1939. He was the first Polish-born player in NHL history.

== Early life ==
Jerwa was born in Warsaw, Congress Poland, Russian Empire, on 22 January 1907 to Frank and Anna Jerwa. He had three brothers, Frank, Art, and Steve, all of whom later played hockey, and a sister, Josephine. The family moved to Bankhead, Alberta in 1911, then to nearby Canmore in 1922. He and his brother Frank played for both the Canmore Miners junior and senior teams during the late 1920s.

== Career ==
Jerwa's hockey career started during the 1928–29 season with the Vancouver Lions in the Pacific Coast Hockey League (PCHL). He played 77 games with them between 1928 and 1930 before being traded to the New York Rangers of the National Hockey League (NHL) along with Red Beattie for $25,000. He played nine games for the Rangers' Can-Am affiliate, the Springfield Indians, before being recalled in December 1930. His NHL debut was on March 17, 1931, in the Rangers' game against the Ottawa Senators, where he recorded an assist with a pass to Butch Keeling during the second period. He played 37 games for New York during the 1930–31 season.

In 1931, he was traded from the Rangers to the Boston Bruins in exchange for Dutch Gainor. The following year, the Bruins traded Red Beattie for Jerwa's brother Frank. Between 1931 and 1935, he played 172 games for the Boston Cubs. In 1935, after 39 games with the Bruins, he was traded along with Nels Stewart to the New York Americans. Though he briefly returned to the Bruins in 1936 due to an incomplete contract, he was sent back to the Americans on loan for Al Shields and future considerations for Terry Reardon and Tom Cooper in 1937. He played 175 games with the Americans until being traded to the Cleveland Barons in 1939, where he played 147 games. He retired in 1942, after being advised by doctors to quit playing due to irreparable tears in his groin muscles. Just weeks before his retirement was announced, he was selected to play in the second-ever AHL All-Star Game on the western team.

== Later life ==
Following his retirement from playing, Jerwa settled in Vancouver and worked as a longshoreman. In 1932, during his time with the Cubs, he married Ethel Melria "Millie" Haynes in Montreal and the couple had two children. Jerwa died on April 11, 1983, aged 75, in Coquitlam, British Columbia. He was survived by his wife, children Jerry and Joan, and five grandchildren. Millie died in 1993.

== Career statistics ==
=== Regular season and playoffs ===
			Regular season					Playoffs
Season	Team	League	GP	G	A	Pts	PIM	GP	G	A	Pts	PIM
1927–28	Canmore Miners	ASHL	—	—	—	—	—	—	—	—	—	—
1928–29	Vancouver Lions	PCHL	35	8	5	13	72	3	0	1	1	6
1929–30	Vancouver Lions	PCHL	35	12	6	18	76	4	1	0	1	6
1930–31	New York Rangers	NHL	3	4	7	11	72	4	0	0	0	4
1930–31	Springfield Indians	Can-Am	9	8	0	8	26	—	—	—	—	—
1931–32	Boston Bruins	NHL	11	0	0	0	8	—	—	—	—	—
1931–32	Boston Cubs	Can-Am	31	7	15	22	116	5	2	2	4	27
1932–33	Boston Cubs	Can-Am	39	10	18	28	108	7	4	2	6	22
1933–34	Boston Bruins	NHL	2	0	0	0	2	—	—	—	—	—
1933–34	Boston Cubs	Can-Am	37	4	8	12	101	5	2	0	2	28
1934–35	Boston Cubs	Can-Am	44	21	17	38	95	3	1	5	6	20
1935–36	New York Americans	NHL	47	9	12	21	65	5	2	3	5	2
1936–37	Boston Bruins	NHL	26	3	5	8	30	—	—	—	—	—
1936–37	New York Americans	NHL	20	6	8	14	27	—	—	—	—	—
1937–38	New York Americans	NHL	48	3	14	17	53	6	0	0	0	8
1938–39	New York Americans	NHL	47	4	12	16	52	2	0	0	0	2
1939–40	Cleveland Barons	AHL	49	4	10	14	61	—	—	—	—	—
1940–41	Cleveland Barons	AHL	56	13	22	35	20	4	4	0	4	6
1941–42	Cleveland Barons	AHL	33	1	8	9	18	—	—	—	—	—
NHL totals			204	29	58	87	309	17	2	3	5	16
