= Eddie Wiseman =

Canadian ice hockey player

- Born: December 28, 1911 Newcastle, New Brunswick, Canada
- Died: May 6, 1977 (aged 65)
- Height: 5 ft 7 in (170 cm)
- Weight: 160 lb (73 kg; 11 st 6 lb)
- Position: Right wing
- Shot: Right
- Played for: Detroit Red Wings; New York Americans; Boston Bruins
- Playing career: 1930–1945

Edward Randall Wiseman (December 28, 1911 – May 6, 1977) was a Canadian ice hockey forward. He was born in Newcastle, New Brunswick, but grew up in Regina, Saskatchewan.

Wiseman started his National Hockey League career with the Detroit Red Wings in 1932. He also played for the New York Americans and Boston Bruins. He retired after the 1942 season. He won the Stanley Cup with the Boston Bruins in 1941.

== Career statistics ==
=== Regular season and playoffs ===
| | | | Regular season | | | | | Playoffs |
| Season | Team | League | GP | G | A | Pts | PIM | GP | G | A | Pts | PIM |
|---|---|---|---|---|---|---|---|---|---|---|---|---|
| 1927–28 | Regina Crescents | RJrHL | — | — | — | — | — | — | — | — | — | — |
| 1928–29 | Regina Argos | S-SJHL | 5 | 1 | 1 | 2 | 2 | — | — | — | — | — |
| 1929–30 | Regina Pats | S-SJHL | 3 | 1 | 0 | 1 | 4 | — | — | — | — | — |
| 1930–31 | Chicago Shamrocks | AHA | 44 | 8 | 11 | 19 | 16 | — | — | — | — | — |
| 1931–32 | Chicago Shamrocks | AHA | 44 | 17 | 17 | 34 | 26 | 4 | 2 | 2 | 4 | 0 |
| 1932–33 | Detroit Red Wings | NHL | 43 | 8 | 8 | 16 | 16 | 2 | 0 | 0 | 0 | 0 |
| 1933–34 | Detroit Red Wings | NHL | 48 | 5 | 9 | 14 | 13 | 7 | 0 | 1 | 1 | 4 |
| 1933–34 | Detroit Olympics | IHL | 1 | 1 | 0 | 1 | 0 | — | — | — | — | — |
| 1934–35 | Detroit Red Wings | NHL | 39 | 11 | 13 | 24 | 14 | — | — | — | — | — |
| 1934–35 | Detroit Olympics | IHL | 12 | 3 | 3 | 6 | 8 | — | — | — | — | — |
| 1935–36 | Detroit Red Wings | NHL | 1 | 0 | 0 | 0 | 0 | — | — | — | — | — |
| 1935–36 | Detroit Olympics | IHL | 3 | 2 | 1 | 3 | 10 | — | — | — | — | — |
| 1935–36 | New York Americans | NHL | 44 | 12 | 16 | 28 | 15 | 4 | 2 | 1 | 3 | 0 |
| 1936–37 | New York Americans | NHL | 44 | 14 | 19 | 33 | 12 | — | — | — | — | — |
| 1937–38 | New York Americans | NHL | 48 | 18 | 14 | 32 | 32 | 6 | 0 | 4 | 4 | 10 |
| 1938–39 | New York Americans | NHL | 47 | 12 | 21 | 33 | 8 | 2 | 0 | 0 | 0 | 0 |
| 1939–40 | New York Americans | NHL | 31 | 5 | 13 | 18 | 8 | — | — | — | — | — |
| 1939–40 | Boston Bruins | NHL | 18 | 2 | 6 | 8 | 0 | 6 | 2 | 1 | 3 | 2 |
| 1940–41 | Boston Bruins | NHL | 48 | 16 | 24 | 40 | 10 | 11 | 6 | 2 | 8 | 0 |
| 1941–42 | Boston Bruins | NHL | 45 | 12 | 22 | 34 | 8 | 5 | 0 | 1 | 1 | 0 |
| 1942–43 | Saskatoon RCAF | SSHL | 15 | 8 | 10 | 18 | 11 | 1 | 1 | 1 | 2 | 0 |
| 1944–45 | Montreal Royals | QSHL | 1 | 1 | 0 | 1 | 0 | 1 | 0 | 0 | 0 | 0 |
| NHL totals | | | 456 | 115 | 165 | 280 | 136 | 43 | 10 | 10 | 20 | 16 |
