= 1935–36 New York Rangers season =

NHL hockey team season

1935–36 New York Rangers
- Division: 4th American
- 1935–36 record: 19–17–12
- Home record: 11–6–7
- Road record: 8–11–5
- Goals for: 137
- Goals against: 139

Team information
- General manager: Lester Patrick
- Coach: Lester Patrick
- Captain: Bill Cook
- Arena: Madison Square Garden

Team leaders
- Goals: Cecil Dillon (18)
- Assists: Frank Boucher (18)
- Points: Cecil Dillon (32)
- Penalty minutes: Ching Johnson (58)
- Wins: Dave Kerr (18)
- Goals against average: Dave Kerr (1.91)

The 1935–36 New York Rangers season was the franchise's 10th season. During the regular season, the Rangers finished in fourth place in the American Division with a record of 19–17–12. It was the first season that the Rangers failed to qualify for the playoffs.

== Regular season ==
=== Final standings ===
American Division
	GP	W	L	T	GF	GA	PTS
**Detroit Red Wings**	48	24	16	8	124	103	56
**Boston Bruins**	48	22	20	6	92	83	50
**Chicago Black Hawks**	48	21	19	8	93	92	50
New York Rangers	48	19	17	12	91	96	50

Note: GP = Games Played, W = Wins, L = Losses, T = Ties, Pts = Points, GF = Goals For, GA = Goals Against
Teams that qualified for the playoffs are highlighted in bold.

=== Record vs. opponents ===
==== Vs. American Division ====
1935–36 NHL records
Team	**BOS**	**CHI**	**DET**	**NYR**	**Total**
Boston	—	3–4–1	5–3	2–6	**10–13–1**
Chicago	4–3–1	—	3–4–1	5–2–1	**12–9–3**
Detroit	3–5	4–3–1	—	4–1–3	**11–9–4**
N.Y. Rangers	6–2	2–5–1	1–4–3	—	**9–11–4**

==== Vs. Canadian Division ====
1935–36 NHL records
Team	**MTL**	**MTM**	**NYA**	**TOR**	**Total**
Boston	3–1–2	4–1–1	4–2	1–3–2	**12–7–5**
Chicago	2–1–3	2–3–1	2–3–1	3–3	**9–10–5**
Detroit	4–0–2	2–3–1	4–1–1	3–3	**13–7–4**
N.Y. Rangers	2–1–3	4–0–2	3–2–1	1–3–2	**10–6–8**

== Schedule and results ==
1935–36 regular season
November: 4–3–2 (home: 2–1–1; road: 2–2–1)

Game	November	Opponent	Score	Record
1	10	@ Detroit Red Wings	1 – 1 OT	0–0–1
2	12	@ Montreal Canadiens	2 – 1 OT	1–0–1
3	14	Toronto Maple Leafs	1–0	1–1–1
4	16	@ Toronto Maple Leafs	3–2	1–2–1
5	17	@ Chicago Black Hawks	3–0	1–3–1
6	19	Detroit Red Wings	2 – 2 OT	1–3–2
7	24	Boston Bruins	1–0	2–3–2
8	26	@ New York Americans	1–0	3–3–2
9	28	Chicago Black Hawks	2–1	4–3–2

December: 5–4–2 (home: 3–0–2; road: 2–4–0)

Game	December	Opponent	Score	Record
10	1	@ Boston Bruins	2–0	4–4–2
11	8	Montreal Maroons	3 – 3 OT	4–4–3
12	12	New York Americans	5 – 2 OT	5–4–3
13	14	@ Montreal Maroons	6–2	6–4–3
14	15	@ Detroit Red Wings	4–2	6–5–3
15	17	Montreal Canadiens	1 – 1 OT	6–5–4
16	22	Boston Bruins	3–1	7–5–4
17	25	@ Boston Bruins	3–2	8–5–4
18	28	@ Toronto Maple Leafs	9–3	8–6–4
19	29	@ Chicago Black Hawks	3–1	8–7–4
20	31	Montreal Maroons	1–0	9–7–4

January: 3–7–1 (home: 2–4–0; road: 1–3–1)

Game	January	Opponent	Score	Record
21	2	New York Americans	6–3	9–8–4
22	5	@ New York Americans	0 – 0 OT	9–8–5
23	7	Detroit Red Wings	2–1	9–9–5
24	12	Boston Bruins	6–3	9–10–5
25	14	@ Montreal Maroons	2–1	10–10–5
26	16	Toronto Maple Leafs	1–0	11–10–5
27	18	@ Montreal Canadiens	3–1	11–11–5
28	21	Chicago Black Hawks	1–0	11–12–5
29	23	@ Detroit Red Wings	4–2	11–13–5
30	26	@ Chicago Black Hawks	2–1	11–14–5
31	28	Montreal Canadiens	3 – 2 OT	12–14–5

February: 3–1–5 (home: 2–0–3; road: 1–1–2)

Game	February	Opponent	Score	Record
32	2	Montreal Maroons	4–2	13–14–5
33	4	Detroit Red Wings	4 – 4 OT	13–14–6
34	9	Boston Bruins	2–0	14–14–6
35	11	@ Montreal Canadiens	1 – 1 OT	14–14–7
36	16	Montreal Canadiens	1 – 1 OT	14–14–8
37	20	Chicago Black Hawks	1 – 1 OT	14–14–9
38	23	@ Boston Bruins	4–3	15–14–9
39	25	@ Toronto Maple Leafs	2 – 2 OT	15–14–10
40	27	@ Detroit Red Wings	4–2	15–15–10

March: 4–2–2 (home: 2–1–1; road: 2–1–1)

Game	March	Opponent	Score	Record
41	1	@ Chicago Black Hawks	2–1	15–16–10
42	3	Toronto Maple Leafs	0 – 0 OT	15–16–11
43	8	New York Americans	1–0	15–17–11
44	10	@ Montreal Maroons	0 – 0 OT	15–17–12
45	12	Detroit Red Wings	4 – 3 OT	16–17–12
46	15	@ New York Americans	2–1	17–17–12
47	17	Chicago Black Hawks	4–2	18–17–12
48	22	@ Boston Bruins	3–1	19–17–12

Legend: Win (2 points) Loss (0 points) Tie (1 point)

== Player statistics ==
Skaters

Regular season
Player	GP	G	A	Pts	PIM
Cecil Dillon	48	18	14	32	12
Frank Boucher	48	11	18	29	2
Lynn Patrick	48	11	14	25	29
Melville Keeling	47	13	5	18	22
Bill Cook	44	7	10	17	16
Glen Brydson^{†}	30	4	12	16	7
Ehrhardt Heller	43	2	11	13	40
Murray Murdoch	48	2	9	11	9
Frederick Cook	26	4	5	9	12
Ivan Johnson	47	5	3	8	58
Howie Morenz^{†}	19	2	5	7	6
Alex Shibicky	18	4	2	6	6
Earl Seibert^{‡}	15	3	3	6	6
Charlie Mason	28	1	5	6	30
Mac Colville	18	1	4	5	6
Arthur Coulter^{†}	23	0	5	5	26
Bert Connelly	25	2	2	4	10
Vernon Ayres	28	0	4	4	38
Walter Pratt	17	1	1	2	16
Phil Watson	24	0	2	2	24
Joe Cooper	1	0	0	0	0
Neil Colville	1	0	0	0	0
Harold Starr	15	0	0	0	12

Goaltenders

Regular season
Player	GP	TOI	W	L	T	GA	GAA	SO
Dave Kerr	47	2980	18	17	12	95	1.91	8
Bert Gardiner	1	60	1	0	0	1	1.00	0

^{†}Denotes player spent time with another team before joining Rangers. Stats reflect time with Rangers only.
^{‡}Traded mid-season. Stats reflect time with Rangers only.

Note:

Pos = Position;GP = Games played; G = Goals; A = Assists; Pts = Points; PIM = Penalty minutes; +/- = Plus/minus; PPG = Power-play goals; SHG = Short-handed goals; GWG = Game-winning goals
Pos = Position;GP = Games played; Min, TOI = Minutes played; W = Wins; L = Losses; T,T/OT = Ties; OTL = Overtime losses; GA = Goals-against; GAA = Goals-against average; SO = Shutouts; SA = Shots against; SV = Shots saved;SV% = Save percentage;

== See also ==
- 1935–36 NHL season
