= 1939–40 Chicago Black Hawks season =

NHL ice hockey team season

1939–40 Chicago Black Hawks
- League: 4th NHL
- 1939–40 record: 23–19–6
- Home record: 15–7–2
- Road record: 8–12–4
- Goals for: 112
- Goals against: 120

Team information
- General manager: Frederic McLaughlin
- Coach: Paul Thompson
- Captain: Johnny Gottselig
- Arena: Chicago Stadium

Team leaders
- Goals: Doug Bentley (12)
- Assists: Cully Dahlstrom (19)
- Points: Cully Dahlstrom (30)
- Penalty minutes: Joe Cooper (59)
- Wins: Paul Goodman (16)
- Goals against average: Paul Goodman (1.94)

The 1939–40 Chicago Black Hawks season was the team's 14th season in the NHL, and they were coming off a disastrous 1938–39 season, in which the Hawks were the only team in the 7 team league to not qualify for the playoffs. Paul Thompson, who finished the previous season as a player-coach with the Hawks, would retire from playing and become the full-time head coach of the team, and Chicago responded, as they improved by 20 points, finishing above .500 for the first time since 1935–36, and having their highest point total since 1934–35, as they would have a 23–19–6 record for 52 points, good for 4th place in the NHL standings.

Rookie Doug Bentley would lead the team with 12 goals, while Cully Dahlstrom would have team highs in assists (19) and points (30). Joe Cooper led all defensemen with 11 points and had a team high 59 penalty minutes, while fellow blueliner Earl Seibert had another productive season, earning 10 points, despite missing some time due to injuries.

In goal, Mike Karakas would begin the season as the starter, however, after 17 games, he was loaned to the Montreal Canadiens for the remainder of the year after posting a 7–9–1 record and a 3.31 GAA. Paul Goodman would then be named the Hawks starting goalie, and he would respond with a 16–10–5 record, and a team high 1.94 GAA.

Chicago would return to the playoffs after a 1-year absence, as they would face the 3rd place team, the Toronto Maple Leafs in a best of 3 series in the 1st round. The Leafs would win the first game of the series by a score of 3–2 in OT at Maple Leaf Gardens, and Toronto would then eliminate Chicago by a 2–1 score in the 2nd game at Chicago Stadium to eliminate the Black Hawks.

== Season standings ==
National Hockey League
	GP	W	L	T	GF	GA	PIM	Pts
**Boston Bruins**	48	31	12	5	170	98	330	67
**New York Rangers**	48	27	11	10	136	77	520	64
**Toronto Maple Leafs**	48	25	17	6	134	110	485	56
**Chicago Black Hawks**	48	23	19	6	112	120	351	52
**Detroit Red Wings**	48	16	26	6	91	126	250	38
**New York Americans**	48	15	29	4	106	140	236	34
Montreal Canadiens	48	10	33	5	90	167	338	25

Note: GP = Games Played, W = Wins, L = Losses, T = Ties, GF = Goals For, GA = Goals Against, PIM = Penalty Minutes, Pts = Points
Teams that qualified for the playoffs are highlighted in bold.

=== Record vs. opponents ===
1939–40 NHL Records
Team	BOS	CHI	DET	MTL	NYA	NYR	TOR
Boston	—	6–1–1	5–3	6–1–1	7–1	2–4–2	5–2–1
Chicago	1–6–1	—	6–0–2	5–2–1	3–4–1	4–4	4–3–1
Detroit	3–5	0–6–2	—	5–3	5–3	2–3–2	1–6–1
Montreal	1–6–1	2–5–1	3–5	—	2–4–2	1–6–1	1–7
N.Y. Americans	1–7	4–3–1	3–5	4–2–2	—	1–6–1	2–6
N.Y. Rangers	4–2–2	4–4	3–2–2	6–1–1	6–1–1	—	4–1–3
Toronto	2–5–1	3–4–1	6–1–1	7–1	6–2	1–4–3	—

== Schedule and results ==
=== Regular season ===
1939–40 regular season
November

Game	Date	Visitor	Score	Home	Record	Points
1	November 2	Detroit Red Wings	2–3	Chicago Black Hawks	1–0–0	2
2	November 5	Chicago Black Hawks	2–8	Montreal Canadiens	1–1–0	2
3	November 12	New York Americans	1–2	Chicago Black Hawks	2–1–0	4
4	November 14	Chicago Black Hawks	1–3	Boston Bruins	2–2–0	4
5	November 16	Chicago Black Hawks	3–2	New York Rangers	3–2–0	6
6	November 19	Boston Bruins	2–0	Chicago Black Hawks	3–3–0	6
7	November 26	Chicago Black Hawks	4–2	Detroit Red Wings	4–3–0	8
8	November 30	New York Rangers	7–2	Chicago Black Hawks	4–4–0	8

December

Game	Date	Visitor	Score	Home	Record	Points
9	December 2	Chicago Black Hawks	3–3	Toronto Maple Leafs	4–4–1	9
10	December 3	Toronto Maple Leafs	3–1	Chicago Black Hawks	4–5–1	9
11	December 7	New York Americans	1–2	Chicago Black Hawks	5–5–1	11
12	December 10	Montreal Canadiens	2–3	Chicago Black Hawks	6–5–1	13
13	December 12	Chicago Black Hawks	0–4	New York Americans	6–6–1	13
14	December 17	Boston Bruins	4–2	Chicago Black Hawks	6–7–1	13
15	December 21	Toronto Maple Leafs	1–3	Chicago Black Hawks	7–7–1	15
16	December 23	Chicago Black Hawks	1–7	New York Rangers	7–8–1	15
17	December 25	Chicago Black Hawks	3–6	Boston Bruins	7–9–1	15
18	December 27	Chicago Black Hawks	2–4	New York Americans	7–10–1	15
19	December 30	Chicago Black Hawks	2–4	Toronto Maple Leafs	7–11–1	15

January

Game	Date	Visitor	Score	Home	Record	Points
20	January 1	Detroit Red Wings	0–1	Chicago Black Hawks	8–11–1	17
21	January 4	Toronto Maple Leafs	1–2	Chicago Black Hawks	9–11–1	19
22	January 7	Montreal Canadiens	2–1	Chicago Black Hawks	9–12–1	19
23	January 9	Chicago Black Hawks	2–0	Montreal Canadiens	10–12–1	21
24	January 11	Chicago Black Hawks	3–5	New York Rangers	10–13–1	21
25	January 14	New York Rangers	1–2	Chicago Black Hawks	11–13–1	23
26	January 21	New York Americans	2–1	Chicago Black Hawks	11–14–1	23
27	January 25	Boston Bruins	2–2	Chicago Black Hawks	11–14–2	24
28	January 26	Chicago Black Hawks	1–1	Detroit Red Wings	11–14–3	25
29	January 28	Montreal Canadiens	1–8	Chicago Black Hawks	12–14–3	27
30	January 30	Chicago Black Hawks	0–5	Boston Bruins	12–15–3	27

February

Game	Date	Visitor	Score	Home	Record	Points
31	February 1	Chicago Black Hawks	2–5	New York Americans	12–16–3	27
32	February 3	Chicago Black Hawks	3–2	Toronto Maple Leafs	13–16–3	29
33	February 4	Detroit Red Wings	1–1	Chicago Black Hawks	13–16–4	30
34	February 8	New York Americans	2–3	Chicago Black Hawks	14–16–4	32
35	February 9	Chicago Black Hawks	3–0	Detroit Red Wings	15–16–4	34
36	February 11	New York Rangers	0–3	Chicago Black Hawks	16–16–4	36
37	February 15	Chicago Black Hawks	1–1	Montreal Canadiens	16–16–5	37
38	February 18	Chicago Black Hawks	1–1	New York Americans	16–16–6	38
39	February 22	Montreal Canadiens	1–10	Chicago Black Hawks	17–16–6	40
40	February 25	Boston Bruins	1–3	Chicago Black Hawks	18–16–6	42
41	February 27	Chicago Black Hawks	0–6	Boston Bruins	18–17–6	42
42	February 29	Chicago Black Hawks	2–1	New York Rangers	19–17–6	44

March

Game	Date	Visitor	Score	Home	Record	Points
43	March 3	New York Rangers	2–1	Chicago Black Hawks	19–18–6	44
44	March 7	Chicago Black Hawks	6–1	Montreal Canadiens	20–18–6	46
45	March 9	Chicago Black Hawks	2–5	Toronto Maple Leafs	20–19–6	46
46	March 10	Toronto Maple Leafs	1–2	Chicago Black Hawks	21–19–6	48
47	March 15	Chicago Black Hawks	4–3	Detroit Red Wings	22–19–6	50
48	March 17	Detroit Red Wings	1–3	Chicago Black Hawks	23–19–6	52

Legend: Win (2 points) Loss (0 points) Tie (1 point)

== Playoffs ==
=== Maple Leafs 2, Black Hawks 0 ===
==== NHL quarter-finals ====
===== (3) Toronto Maple Leafs vs. (4) Chicago Black Hawks =====
March 19	Chicago Black Hawks	2 – 3	OT	Toronto Maple Leafs	Maple Leaf Gardens	Recap
Wiebe (1) – (Unassisted) – 2:31; March (1) – sh – (Unassisted) – 19:41		First period		No scoring
No scoring		Second period		No scoring
No scoring		Third period		1:45 – Church (1) – (Unassisted); 9:09 – Apps (1) – (Davidson, Drillon)
No scoring		First overtime period		6:36 – Apps (2) – (Davidson)
Goodman (0-1)		Goalie stats		Broda (1-0)

March 21	Toronto Maple Leafs	2 – 1	Chicago Black Hawks	Chicago Stadium	Recap
No scoring		First period	No scoring
Drillon (1) – (Unassisted) – 4:18		Second period	No scoring
Goldup (1) – (Unassisted) – 11:56		Third period	9:02 – pp – Carse (1) – (Gottselig, Siebert)
Broda (2-0)		Goalie stats	Goodman (0-2)

Toronto wins series 2 – 0

== Player statistics ==
=== Regular season ===
Skaters

Player	GP	G	A	Pts	PIM
Cully Dahlstrom	45	11	19	30	15
Bill Carse	48	10	13	23	10
Mush March	47	9	14	23	49
Johnny Gottselig	39	8	15	23	7
George Allen	47	10	12	22	26

Goaltenders

Player	GP	TOI	W	L	T	GA	SO	GAA
Paul Goodman	31	1920	16	10	5	62	4	1.94
Mike Karakas	17	1050	7	9	1	58	0	3.31

=== Playoffs ===
Skaters

Player	GP	G	A	Pts	PIM
Mush March	2	1	0	1	2
Bill Carse	2	1	0	1	0
Art Wiebe	2	1	0	1	2
Johnny Gottselig	2	0	1	1	0
Earl Seibert	2	0	1	1	8

Goaltenders

Player	GP	TOI	W	L	GA	SO	GAA
Paul Goodman	2	127	0	2	5	0	2.36
