= 1938 Stanley Cup Final =

1938 ice hockey championship series

	1	2	3	4	Total
Chicago Black Hawks	3	1	2	4	3
Toronto Maple Leafs	1	5	1	1	1
- Location(s): Toronto: Maple Leaf Gardens (1, 2); Chicago: Chicago Stadium (3, 4)
- Format: best-of-five
- Coaches: Chicago: Bill Stewart; Toronto: Dick Irvin
- Captains: Chicago: Johnny Gottselig; Toronto: Charlie Conacher
- Dates: April 5–12, 1938
- Series-winning goal: Carl Voss (16:45, second)
- Hall of Famers: Black Hawks: Earl Seibert (1963); Carl Voss (1974, builder); Maple Leafs: Syl Apps (1961); Turk Broda (1967); Charlie Conacher (1961); Gordie Drillon (1975); Red Horner (1965); Busher Jackson (1971); Coaches: Dick Irvin (1958, player); Officials: Clarence Campbell (1966, builder); Babe Dye (1970, player); Mickey Ion (1961)

The 1938 Stanley Cup Final was a best-of-five series between the Chicago Black Hawks and the Toronto Maple Leafs. Chicago won the series 3–1 to win their second Stanley Cup. With their record of 14–25–9, they possess as of 2022, the lowest regular season winning percentage (.291) of any championship team in the four major professional sports leagues. They are also the Stanley Cup winning team with the lowest number of Hockey Hall of Fame members as a player, with only one (Earl Seibert).

This would be the last best-of-five Stanley Cup Finals.

== Paths to the Finals ==
Toronto defeated Boston Bruins in a best-of-five 3–0 to advance to the Finals. The Black Hawks had to play two best-of three series after narrowly reaching the postseason by two points (at the time, six of the eight teams made the postseason); the Black Hawks won a 2–1 upset against Montreal Canadiens and then won 2–1 against the New York Americans to advance to the Finals.

== Game summaries ==
Chicago lost their regular goaltender, Mike Karakas, during the playoffs and started Alfie Moore in game one. League president Frank Calder ruled that Moore was ineligible, but allowed the victory. Paul Goodman played and lost game two. Karakas returned for games three and four wearing a steel toe in his skate to protect his foot.

Chicago set a record with eight American players winning the Stanley Cup. Also set a record for attendance with 18,497 in game three. It was the second time in NHL history a team won the Stanley cup after starting three different goalies in the playoffs after the Detroit Red Wings accomplished the feat in the previous year; no Stanley Cup Champion would win the cup while starting three different goalies until the Penguins did it in 2016. It was the last time that the Hawks would win the Stanley Cup at home until 2015, and the last year that a Chicago team would win a championship at Chicago Stadium until the Bulls won their second straight NBA championship in 1992.

The NHL did not see fit to make sure that the Stanley Cup was in Chicago when they won the game and the series on April 12.

April 5	Chicago Black Hawks	3–1	Toronto Maple Leafs	Maple Leaf Gardens	Recap
Johnny Gottselig (4) - pp - 19:08		First period	1:54 - Gordie Drillon (4)
Paul Thompson (4) - 1:51		Second period	No scoring
Johnny Gottselig (5) - 12:08		Third period	No scoring
Alfie Moore		Goalie stats	Turk Broda

April 7	Chicago Black Hawks	1–5	Toronto Maple Leafs	Maple Leaf Gardens	Recap
Earl Seibert (5) - pp - 8:31		First period	1:42 - Gordie Drillon (5)
No scoring		Second period	6:10 - Busher Jackson (1)
No scoring		Third period	9:44 - Gordie Drillon (6); 11:29 - George Parsons (2); 12:08 - George Parsons (3)
Alfie Moore		Goalie stats	Turk Broda

April 10	Toronto Maple Leafs	1–2	Chicago Black Hawks	Chicago Stadium	Recap
Syl Apps (1) - pp - 1:35		First period	No scoring
No scoring		Second period	16:02 - Carl Voss (2)
No scoring		Third period	15:55 - Doc Romnes (2)
Turk Broda		Goalie stats	Alfie Moore

April 12	Toronto Maple Leafs	1–4	Chicago Black Hawks	Chicago Stadium	Recap
Gordie Drillon (7) - 8:26		First period	5:52 - Cully Dahlstrom (3)
No scoring		Second period	16:45 - Carl Voss (3); 17:58 - Jack Shill (1)
No scoring		Third period	16:24 - Mush March (2)
Turk Broda		Goalie stats	Alfie Moore

Chicago won series 3–1

== Stanley Cup engraving ==
The 1938 Stanley Cup was presented to Black Hawks captain Johnny Gottselig by NHL President Frank Calder following the Black Hawks 4–1 win over the Maple Leafs in game four.

The following Black Hawks players and staff had their names engraved on the Stanley Cup

1937–38 Chicago Black Hawks

=== Players ===
Centres

- 3 Jack Shill
- 14 Carl Voss*
- 15 Carol Cully Dahlstrom*

Wingers

- 5 Harold Mush March
- 6 Paul Thompson
- 7 Johnny Gottselig (Captain)
- 12 Ewlyn Doc Romnes*
- 16 Louis Trudel*
- 18 Pete Palangio
- 18 Bert Connelly †

Defencemen

- 2 Art Wiebe
- 4 Bill MacKenzie
- 8 Alex Levinsky*
- 10 Virgil Johnson* †
- 14 Harold "Hal" Jackson* †
- 16 Roger Jenkins*
- 17 Earl Seibert

Goaltenders

- 1 Mike Karakas*
- 1 Alfie Moore (Sub)†
- 1 Paul Goodman (Sub)†

=== Coaching and administrative staff ===
- Frederic McLaughlin* (President/Owner), Bill Tobin (Vice President)
- Thorne Donnelley (Secretary-Treasurer), Bill Stewart* (Manager-Coach),
- Eddie Froelich (Trainer)†

* Denotes American born.

=== Stanley Cup engraving ===
- * Bill Stewart was the first American-born, and fifth NHL rookie coach to win the Stanley Cup. Bob Johnson would be the second American-born to Coach win the Stanley Cup in 1991, 53 years later. He was also the first American-born Manager to win the Stanley Cup. The second was Brian Burke in 2007, 69 years later.
- When the cup was redesigned during the 1957–58 season, Pete Palangio's name was engraved twice, firstly as PALAGO, secondly as PETE PALANGIO.
- † Six names were left off the cup when it was redone during the 1957–58 season. Four were on the original ring – Virgil Johnson, Paul Goodman, Alfie Moore(players), and Ed Froelich (Trainer). Players Hal Jackson and Bert Connelly qualified to be engraved on the Stanley Cup, but their names were not included on any version of the 1938 Chicago team's engravings. There is room on the Stanley Cup for all six missing names.
- With this victory, Carl Voss became the third player and only American to have his name engraved on the Stanley Cup and Canadian football's Grey Cup. He had previously been part of the Queen's Golden Gaels football team that won the 12th Grey Cup in 1924. (See Joe Miller, Lionel Conacher, Leo Dandurand, Norman Kwong & Wayne Gretzky also won the Grey Cup and Stanley Cup.)

== See also ==
- 1937–38 NHL season

== References & notes ==
- Diamond, Dan (2000). Total Stanley Cup. Toronto: Total Sports Canada. ISBN 978-1-892129-07-9.
- Podnieks, Andrew; Hockey Hall of Fame (2004). Lord Stanley's Cup. Bolton, Ont.: Fenn Pub. pp 12, 50. ISBN 978-1-55168-261-7
- "All-Time NHL Results". Archived from the original on July 24, 2017.

Preceded by Detroit Red Wings; 1937	Chicago Black Hawks; Stanley Cup champions 1938	Succeeded by Boston Bruins; 1939
