= 1937–38 NHL transactions =

The following is a list of all team-to-team transactions that have occurred in the National Hockey League (NHL) during the 1937–38 NHL season. It lists which team each player has been traded to and for which player(s) or other consideration(s), if applicable.

== Transactions ==
May 9, 1937	To New York Americans Earl Robertson	To Detroit Red Wings John Doran $7,500 cash
September 23, 1937	To Toronto Maple Leafs cash	To New York Americans Hap Day
September 23, 1937	To Toronto Maple Leafs cash future considerations	To Boston Bruins Art Jackson
October 7, 1937	To New York Americans Charlie Mason	To New York Rangers cash
October 7, 1937	To New York Americans John Gallagher	To Detroit Red Wings $6,000 cash
October 17, 1937	To Toronto Maple Leafs rights to Wally Stanowski	To New York Americans Jack Shill
October 28, 1937	To New York Americans cash	To Montreal Canadiens Ossie Asmundson
November 5, 1937	To Boston Bruins cash	To New York Americans Hooley Smith
December 10, 1937	To Montreal Canadiens Marty Burke	To Chicago Black Hawks Bill MacKenzie
December 19, 1937	To Boston Bruins Gord Pettinger	To Detroit Red Wings Red Beattie
December 22, 1937	To Boston Bruins Clarence Drouillard cash	To Detroit Red Wings Alex Motter
January 9, 1938	To New York Americans Glenn Brydson	To Chicago Black Hawks cash
January 17, 1938	To Detroit Red Wings Eddie Wares	To New York Rangers $12,500 cash loan of John Sherf for remainder of 1937-38 season
January 24, 1938	To New York Americans Red Beattie	To Detroit Red Wings Joe Lamb
January 26, 1938	To New York Americans cash	To Chicago Black Hawks Jack Shill
