= Clarence Drouillard =

Canadian ice hockey player

- Born: March 2, 1914; Windsor, Ontario, Canada
- Died: May 3, 1986 (aged 72); Windsor, Ontario, Canada
- Height: 5 ft 7 in (170 cm)
- Weight: 150 lb (68 kg; 10 st 10 lb)
- Position: Centre
- Shot: Left
- Played for: Detroit Red Wings
- Playing career: 1933–1945

Clarence Joseph "Clare" Drouillard (March 2, 1914 – May 3, 1986) was a Canadian ice hockey player who played 10 games in the National Hockey League with the Detroit Red Wings during the 1937–38 season. The rest of his career, which lasted from 1933 to 1945, was spent in various minor leagues.

== Career statistics ==
=== Regular season and playoffs ===
			Regular season					Playoffs
Season	Team	League	GP	G	A	Pts	PIM	GP	G	A	Pts	PIM
1932–33	Windsor Walkerton Tech	CAHS	3	3	3	6	0	—	—	—	—	—
1932–33	Windsor Wanderers	MOHL	18	9	3	12	14	—	—	—	—	—
1933–34	St. Michael's Majors	OHA	11	14	11	25	4	3	4	2	6	4
1933–34	St. Michael's Majors	M-Cup	—	—	—	—	—	11	15	20	35	14
1934–35	Windsor Bulldogs	IHL	44	7	15	22	12	—	—	—	—	—
1935–36	Windsor Bulldogs	IHL	48	14	15	29	43	8	2	3	5	6
1936–37	Pittsburgh Hornets	IAHL	48	15	16	31	28	5	0	1	1	2
1937–38	Pittsburgh Hornets	IAHL	5	0	4	4	4	—	—	—	—	—
1937–38	Providence Reds	IAHL	31	6	8	14	17	7	1	5	6	0
1937–38	Detroit Red Wings	NHL	10	0	1	1	0	—	—	—	—	—
1938–39	Hershey Bears	IAHL	50	9	17	26	20	1	0	0	0	0
1939–40	Pittsburgh Hornets	IAHL	56	12	25	37	22	9	3	4	7	6
1940–41	Pittsburgh Hornets	AHL	31	6	13	19	6	—	—	—	—	—
1940–41	Springfield Indians	AHL	6	0	1	1	2	—	—	—	—	—
1940–41	Buffalo Bisons	AHL	9	0	2	2	6	—	—	—	—	—
1941–42	Buffalo Bisons	AHL	48	3	10	13	6	—	—	—	—	—
1941–42	Philadelphia Rockets	AHL	2	1	0	1	0	—	—	—	—	—
1942–43	Windsor Abars	ONDHL	11	9	14	23	2	7	9	2	11	0
1943–44	Windsor Gotfredson	ONDHL	9	14	11	25	2	3	2	3	5	2
1944–45	Windsor Gotfredson	ONDHL	2	2	0	2	2	2	4	4	8	0
IAHL/AHL totals			286	52	96	148	111	22	4	10	14	8
NHL totals			10	0	1	1	0	—	—	—	—	—
