= Alfie Moore =

Canadian ice hockey player

- Born: December 1, 1904; Toronto, Ontario, Canada
- Died: June 29, 1979 (aged 74); Cambridge, Ontario, Canada
- Height: 5 ft 11 in (180 cm)
- Weight: 162 lb (73 kg; 11 st 8 lb)
- Position: Goaltender
- Caught: Right
- Played for: New York Americans; Chicago Black Hawks; Detroit Red Wings
- Playing career: 1925–1942

Alfred Ernest Moore (December 1, 1904 – June 29, 1979) was a Canadian professional ice hockey goaltender. Moore played 16 seasons of professional ice hockey between 1925 and 1942, including 21 games in the National Hockey League with the Chicago Black Hawks, New York Americans and Detroit Red Wings between 1937 and 1940

== Playing career ==
During game one of the 1938 Stanley Cup Finals Moore replaced Mike Karakas in the Chicago Black Hawks net when replacement goaltender Paul Goodman did not arrive in Toronto on time. Moore held the Toronto Maple Leafs to one goal as Chicago won 3–1. After this game, he was declared ineligible by NHL president Frank Calder after Goodman arrived in Toronto. As the result of the Black Hawks Stanley Cup win, he was given a gold watch and $300 by Hawks management.

Moore began his professional career with Eddie Livingstone's Chicago Cardinals in 1926–27. He then played for Kitchener of the Can-Pro league. After Kitchener relocated he joined Toronto's IHL, but was traded to Cleveland of the IHL for Winston Fisher. At the end of the season, the New York Rangers claimed him in the inter-league draft. He was loaned by the Rangers to Springfield of the Can-Am for several seasons, then traded back to Cleveland in 1932. He signed as a free agent with New Haven of the Can-Am the following year. He was traded to the New York Americans in November 1936. He made his NHL debut for the Americans, a shutout against the Montreal Canadiens in January 1937. He was loaned to Chicago for game one of the 1938 Stanley Cup Finals. In 1939, he was loaned to the Detroit Red Wings who sent him to Indianapolis of the IAHL but played for Red Wings when Tiny Thompson was hurt. The Americans sent him to Springfield in 1940 and he played out his career for several teams in the AHL, retiring after the 1941–42 season.

== Career statistics ==
=== Regular season and playoffs ===
			Regular season								Playoffs
Season	Team	League	GP	W	L	T	Min	GA	SO	GAA	GP	W	L	T	Min	GA	SO	GAA
1920–21	Toronto Canoe Club	OHA	3	3	0	0	180	2	1	0.67	—	—	—	—	—	—	—	—
1921–22	Toronto Aura Lee	OHA	3	3	0	0	180	4	0	1.33	—	—	—	—	—	—	—	—
1922–23	Toronto Aura Lee	OHA	1	0	1	0	60	3	0	3.00	—	—	—	—	—	—	—	—
1923–24	Toronto Aura Lee	OHA	4	2	1	1	290	7	1	1.45	—	—	—	—	—	—	—	—
1924–25	Toronto Aura Lee	OHA	8	2	6	0	520	31	0	3.58	—	—	—	—	—	—	—	—
1925–26	London Ravens	OHA Sr	20	14	5	1	1300	51	0	2.35	2	1	0	1	120	6	0	3.00
1925–26	London Ravens	Al-Cup	—	—	—	—	—	—	—	—	2	0	1	1	120	7	0	3.50
1926–27	Chicago Cardinals	AHA	12	4	7	1	720	22	3	1.83	—	—	—	—	—	—	—	—
1927–28	Kitchener Millionaires	Can-Pro	1	0	1	0	70	3	0	2.57	—	—	—	—	—	—	—	—
1928–29	Kitchener Flying Dutchmen	Can-Pro	42	19	19	4	2600	112	7	2.59	3	1	2	0	230	6	1	1.57
1929–30	Cleveland Indians	IHL	42	24	9	9	2610	78	8	1.79	6	5	1	0	390	9	2	1.38
1930–31	Springfield Indians	Can-Am	40	29	2	2	2459	99	2	2.42	7	3	2	0	570	19	0	2.00
1931–32	Springfield Indians	Can-Am	22	5	13	4	1350	64	0	2.84	—	—	—	—	—	—	—	—
1932–33	Springfield Indians	Can-Am	13	6	5	2	810	30	1	2.22	—	—	—	—	—	—	—	—
1932–33	Cleveland Indians	IHL	24	—	—	—	1440	77	3	3.21	—	—	—	—	—	—	—	—
1933–34	New Haven Eagles	Can-Am	41	12	25	4	2530	107	4	2.54	—	—	—	—	—	—	—	—
1934–35	New Haven Eagles	Can-Am	48	16	23	9	3000	145	2	2.90	—	—	—	—	—	—	—	—
1934–35	Philadelphia Arrows	Can-Am	1	0	1	0	60	1	0	1.00	—	—	—	—	—	—	—	—
1935–36	New Haven Eagles	Can-Am	20	8	10	2	1240	56	3	2.71	—	—	—	—	—	—	—	—
1935–36	Springfield Indians	Can-Am	1	0	0	1	70	2	0	1.71	—	—	—	—	—	—	—	—
1935–36	Providence Reds	Can-Am	6	4	2	0	360	16	1	2.67	—	—	—	—	—	—	—	—
1935–36	Boston Cubs	Can-Am	1	0	1	0	60	3	0	3.00	—	—	—	—	—	—	—	—
1936–37	New York Americans	NHL	18	7	11	0	1100	64	1	3.49	—	—	—	—	—	—	—	—
1936–37	New Haven Eagles	Can-Am	28	9	14	5	1750	73	3	2.50	—	—	—	—	—	—	—	—
1937–38	Pittsburgh Hornets	IAHL	39	19	14	6	2430	80	7	1.98	—	—	—	—	—	—	—	—
1937–38	Chicago Black Hawks	NHL	—	—	—	—	—	—	—	—	1	1	0	—	60	1	0	1.00
1938–39	New York Americans	NHL	2	0	2	0	120	14	0	7.00	2	0	2	—	120	6	0	3.00
1938–39	Hershey Bears	IAHL	53	31	18	4	3260	105	7	1.93	3	1	2	—	180	8	0	2.66
1939–40	Detroit Red Wings	NHL	1	0	1	0	60	3	0	3.00	—	—	—	—	—	—	—	—
1939–40	Indianapolis Capitals	IAHL	27	10	13	4	1670	76	4	2.73	5	2	3	—	342	12	0	2.11
1939–40	Hershey Bears	IAHL	13	6	5	2	810	45	1	3.33	—	—	—	—	—	—	—	—
1940–41	Springfield Indians	AHL	8	4	3	1	500	24	1	2.88	—	—	—	—	—	—	—	—
1940–41	New Haven Eagles	AHL	3	1	0	2	200	11	0	3.30	—	—	—	—	—	—	—	—
1940–41	Cleveland Barons	AHL	8	3	4	1	490	27	0	3.31	6	4	2	—	360	16	0	2.67
1941–42	Philadelphia Rockets	AHL	19	6	11	2	1160	79	1	4.09	—	—	—	—	—	—	—	—
1941–42	Buffalo Bisons	AHL	2	0	1	1	130	7	0	3.23	—	—	—	—	—	—	—	—
NHL totals			21	7	14	0	1280	81	1	3.80	3	1	2	—	180	7	0	2.33
