= Calder Memorial Trophy =

NHL award for the rookie of the year

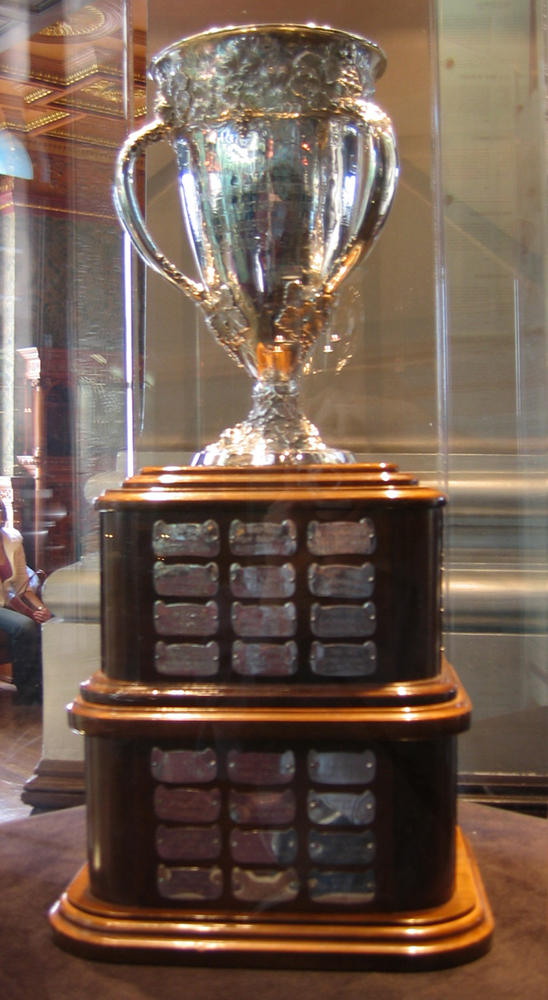
- Sport: Ice hockey
- Awarded for: Rookie of the Year in the National Hockey League

History
- First award: 1936–37 NHL season
- Most recent: Matthew Schaefer; New York Islanders

The Calder Memorial Trophy is an annual award given "to the player selected as the most proficient in his first year of competition in the National Hockey League (NHL)." It is named after Frank Calder, the first president of the NHL. Serving as the NHL's Rookie of the Year award, this version of the trophy has been awarded since its creation for the 1936–37 NHL season. The voting is conducted by members of the Professional Hockey Writers' Association at the conclusion of each regular season to determine the winner.

== Eligibility ==
When the award was established in 1937, there were no requirements beyond that the winner be in his first year of competition in the NHL, and the winner was decided by League President Frank Calder himself.

Currently, the eligibility requirements are that a player cannot have played more than 25 regular season games in any single preceding season, nor in six or more games in each of any two preceding regular seasons, in any major professional league. The last requirement was implemented in 1979 to block Wayne Gretzky (who had played a single season in the World Hockey Association the year before) from winning the award. After the Calder win of 31-year-old Sergei Makarov in 1991 (following the influx of Eastern Bloc players around the fall of the Soviet Union), the rules were further amended to require that winners be 26 years of age or younger.

Further, the limitation is for regular season games only, exempting games played in the playoffs. This has led to aberrations such as Ken Dryden winning the Calder in 1972, despite leading the Montreal Canadiens to a Stanley Cup victory the season before, and winning the Conn Smythe Trophy as the playoff MVP.

== History ==
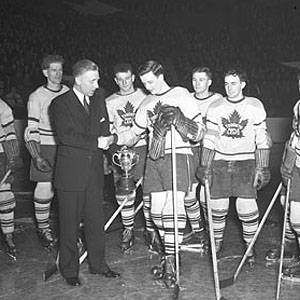
NHL president Red Dutton presenting the Calder Memorial Trophy to Gus Bodnar in 1944

The Calder Memorial Trophy is named in honour of Frank Calder, the former president of the National Hockey League (NHL) from its inception in 1917 to his death in 1943. Although Rookie of the Year honors were handed out beginning in 1932–33, the Calder Trophy was first presented at the conclusion of the 1936–37 season. Calder himself purchased a trophy each year to award to the winner.

After Calder's death in 1943 a permanent trophy was cast, and it was renamed the Calder Memorial Trophy.

The trophy has been won the most times by rookies from the Toronto Maple Leafs, who have won it on ten occasions, with the most recent being Auston Matthews in 2017. The second-most is the Chicago Blackhawks with nine wins.

Since the 1947–48 season, the voting is conducted at the end of the regular season by members of the Professional Hockey Writers' Association, and each individual voter ranks their top five candidates on a 10–7–5–3–1 points system. Three finalists are named and the trophy is awarded at the NHL Awards ceremony after the playoffs.

== Winners ==
Positions key
C	Centre
LW	Left wing
RW	Right wing
D	Defence
G	Goaltender

Player is still active in the NHL
Player is inducted in the Hockey Hall of Fame

Calder Memorial Trophy winners
Season	Winner	Team	Position	Age (Note: Player's age at the time of award win)
1932–33	Carl Voss	Detroit Red Wings	C	25
1933–34	Russ Blinco	Montreal Maroons	C	25
1934–35	Sweeney Schriner	New York Americans	LW	22
1935–36	Mike Karakas	Chicago Black Hawks	G	23
1936–37	Syl Apps	Toronto Maple Leafs	C	21
1937–38	Cully Dahlstrom	Chicago Black Hawks	C	24
1938–39	Frank Brimsek	Boston Bruins	G	24
1939–40	Kilby MacDonald	New York Rangers	LW	25
1940–41	Johnny Quilty	Montreal Canadiens	C	19
1941–42	Grant Warwick	New York Rangers	RW	19
1942–43	Gaye Stewart	Toronto Maple Leafs	RW	19
1943–44	Gus Bodnar	Toronto Maple Leafs	C	20
1944–45	Frank McCool	Toronto Maple Leafs	G	25
1945–46	Edgar Laprade	New York Rangers	C	25
1946–47	Howie Meeker	Toronto Maple Leafs	RW	21
1947–48	Jim McFadden	Detroit Red Wings	C	27
1948–49	Pentti Lund	New York Rangers	RW	22
1949–50	Jack Gelineau	Boston Bruins	G	24
1950–51	Terry Sawchuk	Detroit Red Wings	G	20
1951–52	Bernie Geoffrion	Montreal Canadiens	RW	20
1952–53	Gump Worsley	New York Rangers	G	23
1953–54	Camille Henry	New York Rangers	C	20
1954–55	Ed Litzenberger	Chicago Black Hawks	RW	22
1955–56	Glenn Hall	Detroit Red Wings	G	23
1956–57	Larry Regan	Boston Bruins	RW	26
1957–58	Frank Mahovlich	Toronto Maple Leafs	LW	19
1958–59	Ralph Backstrom	Montreal Canadiens	C	20
1959–60	Bill Hay	Chicago Black Hawks	C	23
1960–61	Dave Keon	Toronto Maple Leafs	C	20
1961–62	Bobby Rousseau	Montreal Canadiens	RW	21
1962–63	Kent Douglas	Toronto Maple Leafs	D	26
1963–64	Jacques Laperriere	Montreal Canadiens	D	21
1964–65	Roger Crozier	Detroit Red Wings	G	22
1965–66	Brit Selby	Toronto Maple Leafs	LW	20
1966–67	Bobby Orr	Boston Bruins	D	18
1967–68	Derek Sanderson	Boston Bruins	C	21
1968–69	Danny Grant	Minnesota North Stars	RW	23
1969–70	Tony Esposito	Chicago Black Hawks	G	26
1970–71	Gilbert Perreault	Buffalo Sabres	C	19
1971–72	Ken Dryden	Montreal Canadiens	G	24
1972–73	Steve Vickers	New York Rangers	LW	21
1973–74	Denis Potvin	New York Islanders	D	19
1974–75	Eric Vail	Atlanta Flames	LW	20
1975–76	Bryan Trottier	New York Islanders	C	19
1976–77	Willi Plett	Atlanta Flames	RW	21
1977–78	Mike Bossy	New York Islanders	RW	20
1978–79	Bobby Smith	Minnesota North Stars	C	20
1979–80	Ray Bourque	Boston Bruins	D	19
1980–81	Peter Stastny	Quebec Nordiques	C	24
1981–82	Dale Hawerchuk	Winnipeg Jets	C	18
1982–83	Steve Larmer	Chicago Black Hawks	RW	21
1983–84	Tom Barrasso	Buffalo Sabres	G	18
1984–85	Mario Lemieux	Pittsburgh Penguins	C	19
1985–86	Gary Suter	Calgary Flames	D	21
1986–87	Luc Robitaille	Los Angeles Kings	LW	20
1987–88	Joe Nieuwendyk	Calgary Flames	C	21
1988–89	Brian Leetch	New York Rangers	D	20
1989–90	Sergei Makarov	Calgary Flames	RW	31
1990–91	Ed Belfour	Chicago Blackhawks	G	25
1991–92	Pavel Bure	Vancouver Canucks	RW	20
1992–93	Teemu Selanne	Winnipeg Jets	RW	22
1993–94	Martin Brodeur	New Jersey Devils	G	21
1994–95	Peter Forsberg	Quebec Nordiques	C	21
1995–96	Daniel Alfredsson	Ottawa Senators	RW	22
1996–97	Bryan Berard	New York Islanders	D	19
1997–98	Sergei Samsonov	Boston Bruins	LW	19
1998–99	Chris Drury	Colorado Avalanche	C	22
1999–2000	Scott Gomez	New Jersey Devils	C	19
2000–01	Evgeni Nabokov	San Jose Sharks	G	25
2001–02	Dany Heatley	Atlanta Thrashers	RW	20
2002–03	Barret Jackman	St. Louis Blues	D	21
2003–04	Andrew Raycroft	Boston Bruins	G	23
2004–05 (Note: No winner because of the 2004–05 NHL lockout)	—	—	—	—
2005–06	Alexander Ovechkin	Washington Capitals	LW	20
2006–07	Evgeni Malkin	Pittsburgh Penguins	C	20
2007–08	Patrick Kane	Chicago Blackhawks	RW	19
2008–09	Steve Mason	Columbus Blue Jackets	G	21
2009–10	Tyler Myers	Buffalo Sabres	D	20
2010–11	Jeff Skinner	Carolina Hurricanes	C	19
2011–12	Gabriel Landeskog	Colorado Avalanche	LW	19
2012–13	Jonathan Huberdeau	Florida Panthers	LW	19
2013–14	Nathan MacKinnon	Colorado Avalanche	C	18
2014–15	Aaron Ekblad	Florida Panthers	D	19
2015–16	Artemi Panarin	Chicago Blackhawks	LW	24
2016–17	Auston Matthews	Toronto Maple Leafs	C	19
2017–18	Mathew Barzal	New York Islanders	C	21
2018–19	Elias Pettersson	Vancouver Canucks	C	20
2019–20	Cale Makar	Colorado Avalanche	D	21
2020–21	Kirill Kaprizov	Minnesota Wild	LW	24
2021–22	Moritz Seider	Detroit Red Wings	D	21
2022–23	Matty Beniers	Seattle Kraken	C	20
2023–24	Connor Bedard	Chicago Blackhawks	C	18
2024–25	Lane Hutson	Montreal Canadiens	D	21
2025–26	Matthew Schaefer	New York Islanders	D	18

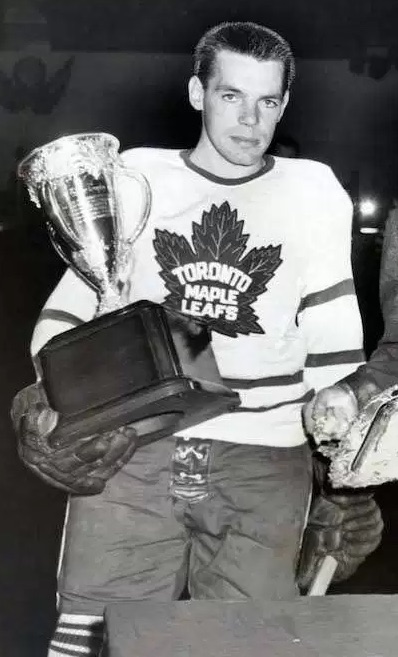
Howie Meeker, winner in 1947

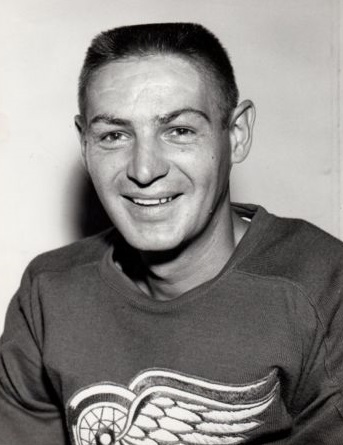
Terry Sawchuk, winner in 1951

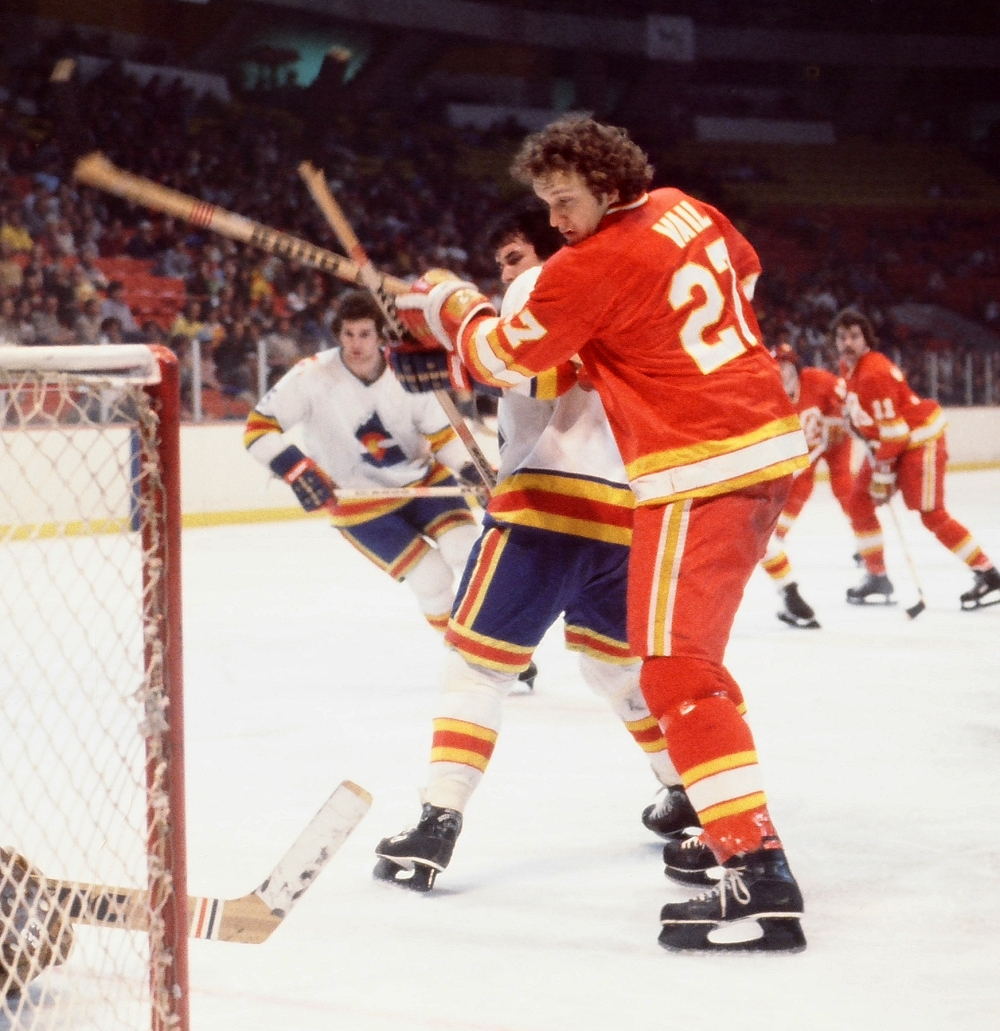
Eric Vail, winner in 1975

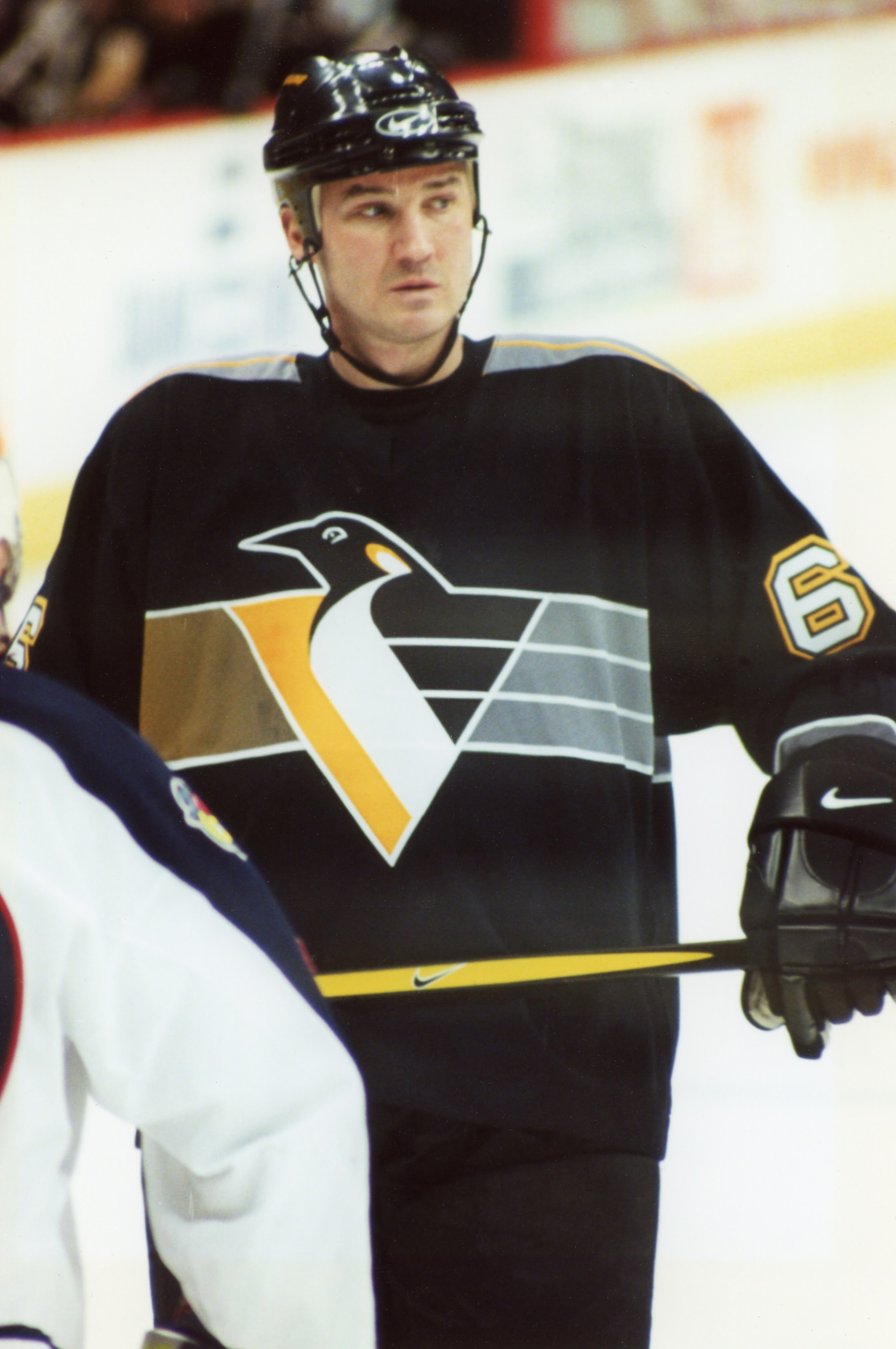
Mario Lemieux, winner in 1985

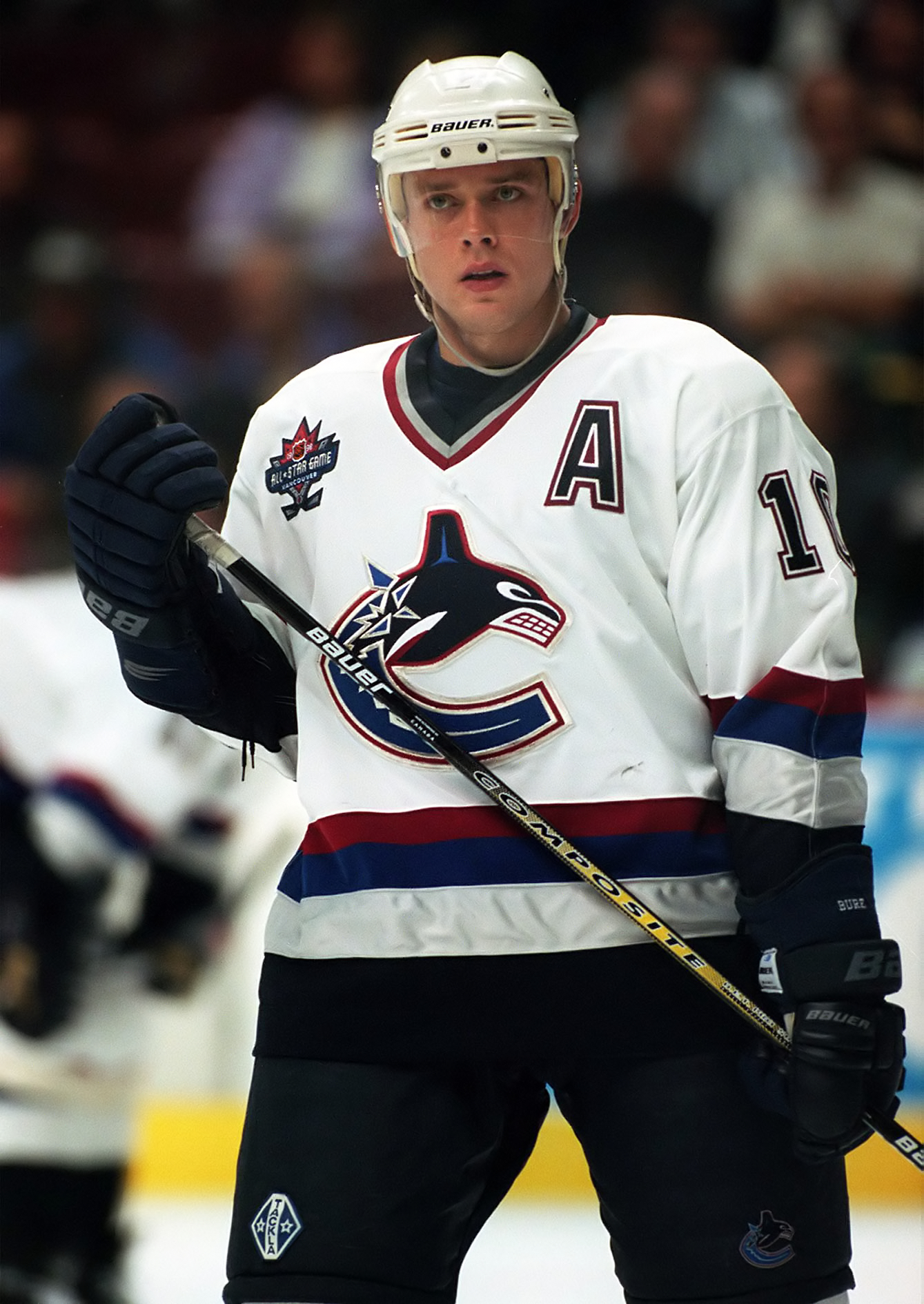
Pavel Bure, winner in 1992

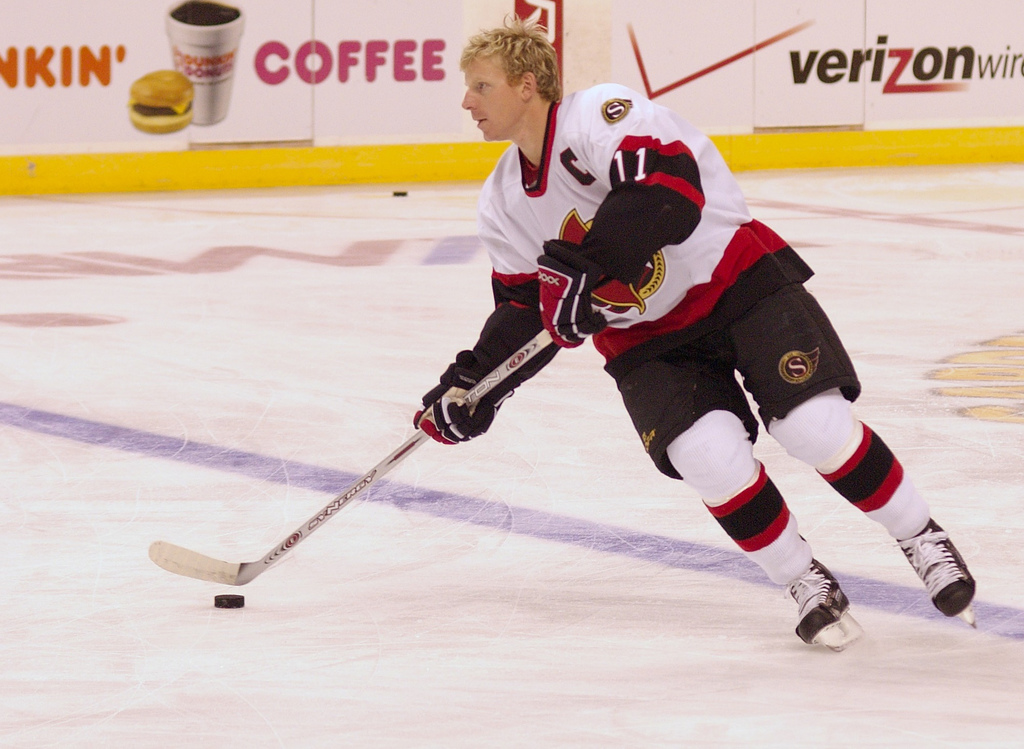
Daniel Alfredsson, winner in 1996

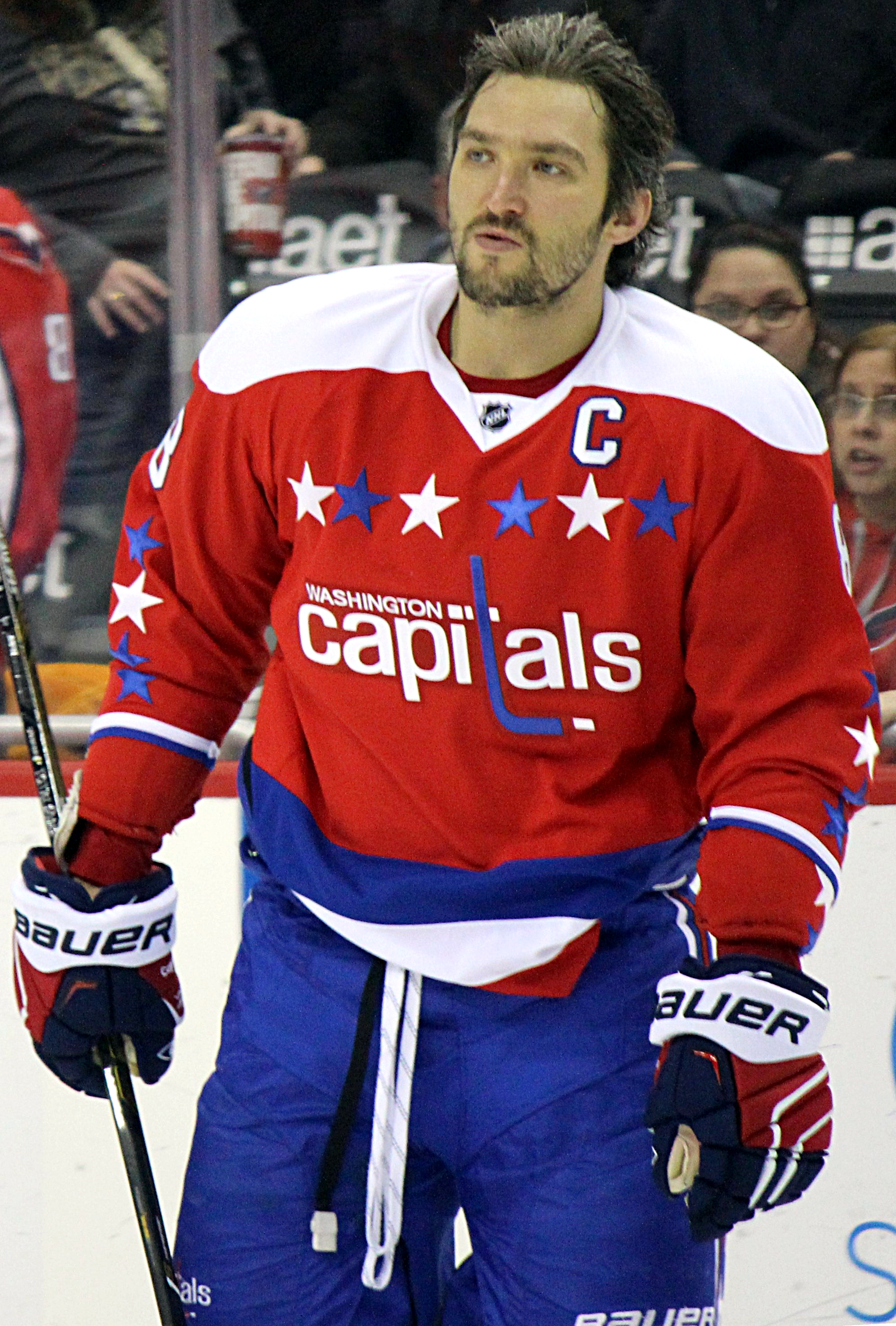
Alexander Ovechkin, winner in 2006

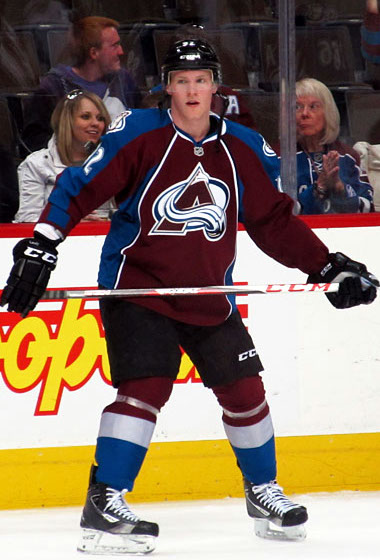
Gabriel Landeskog, winner in 2012

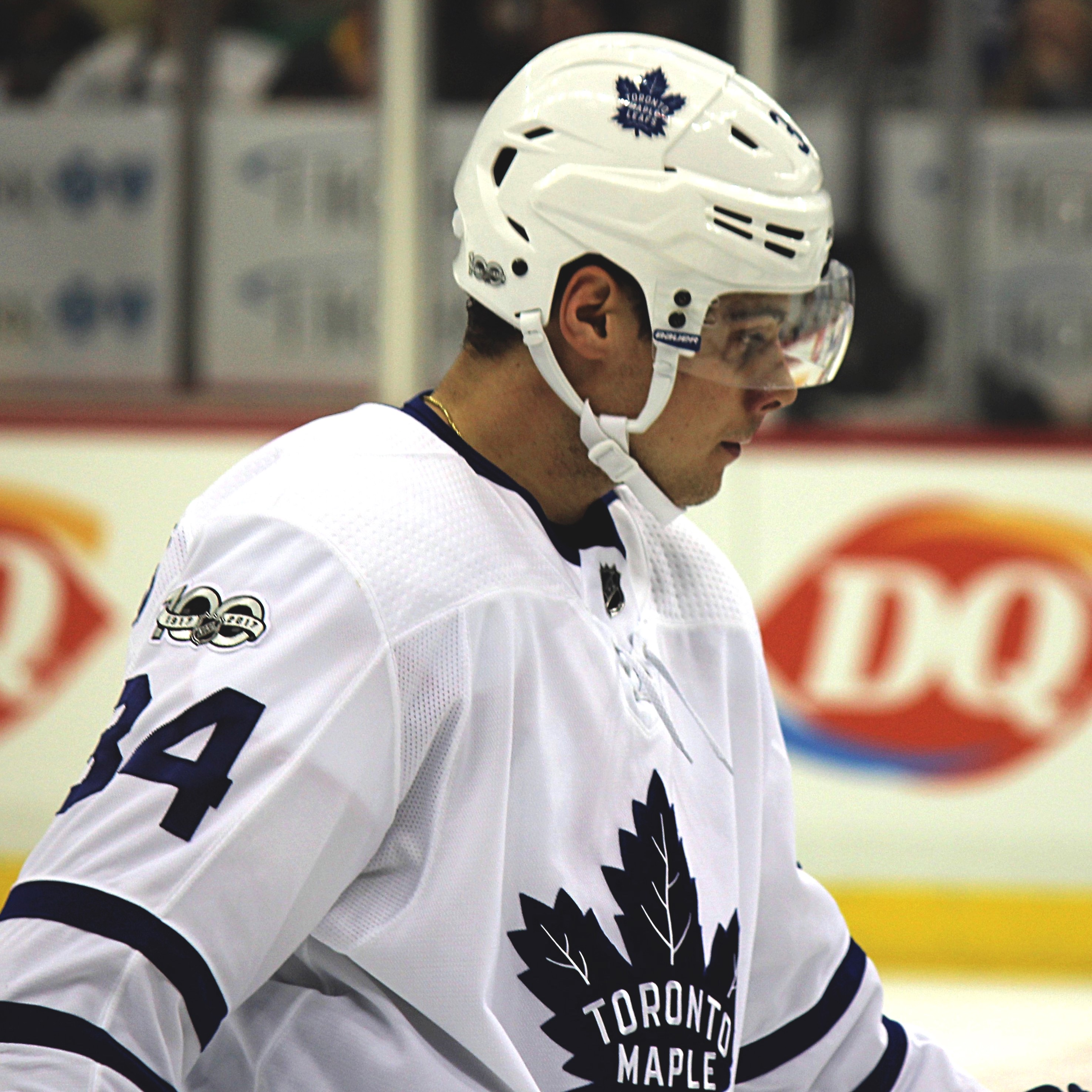
Auston Matthews, winner in 2017

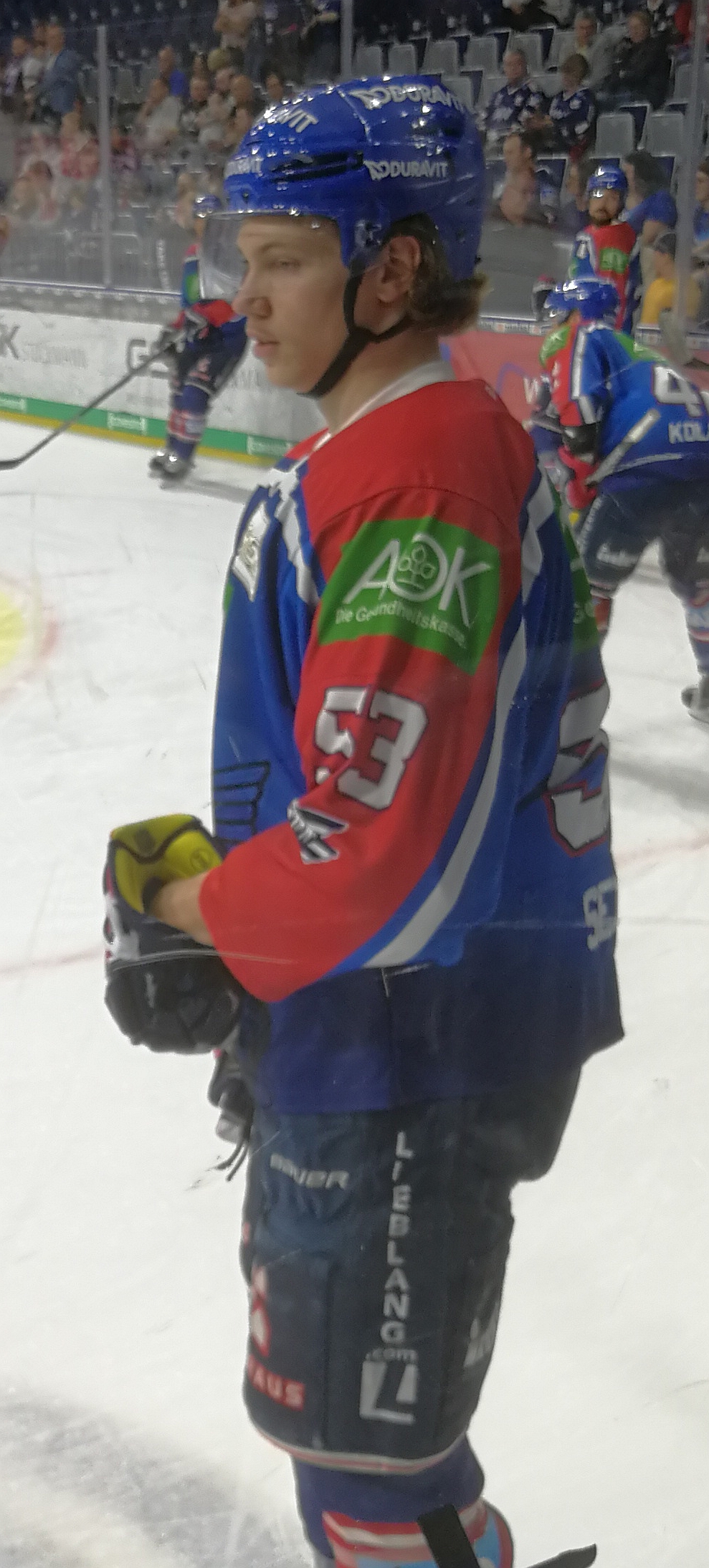
Moritz Seider, winner in 2022

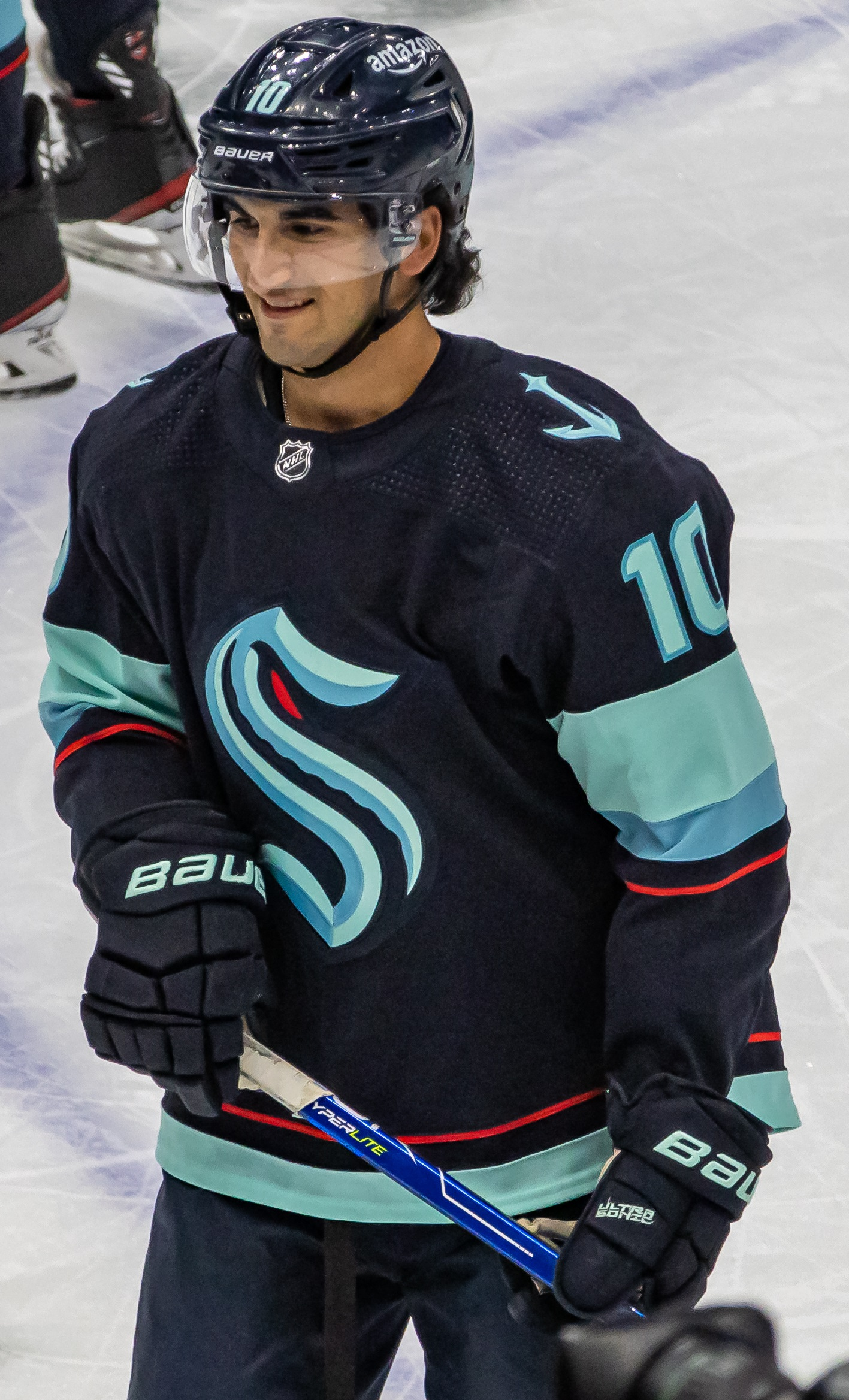
Matty Beniers, winner in 2023

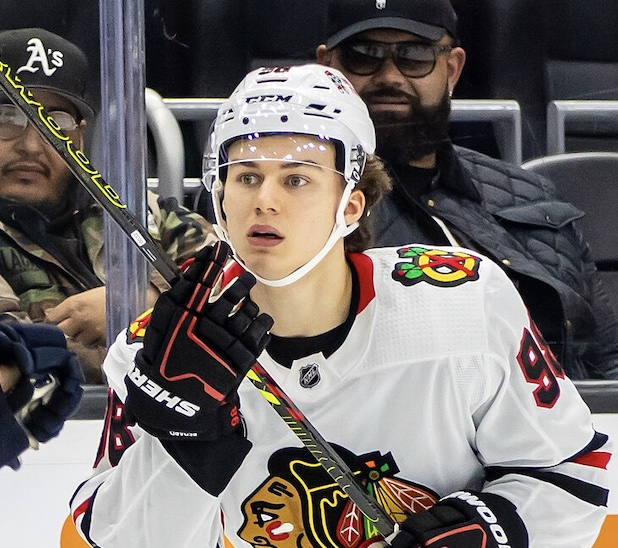
Connor Bedard, winner in 2024

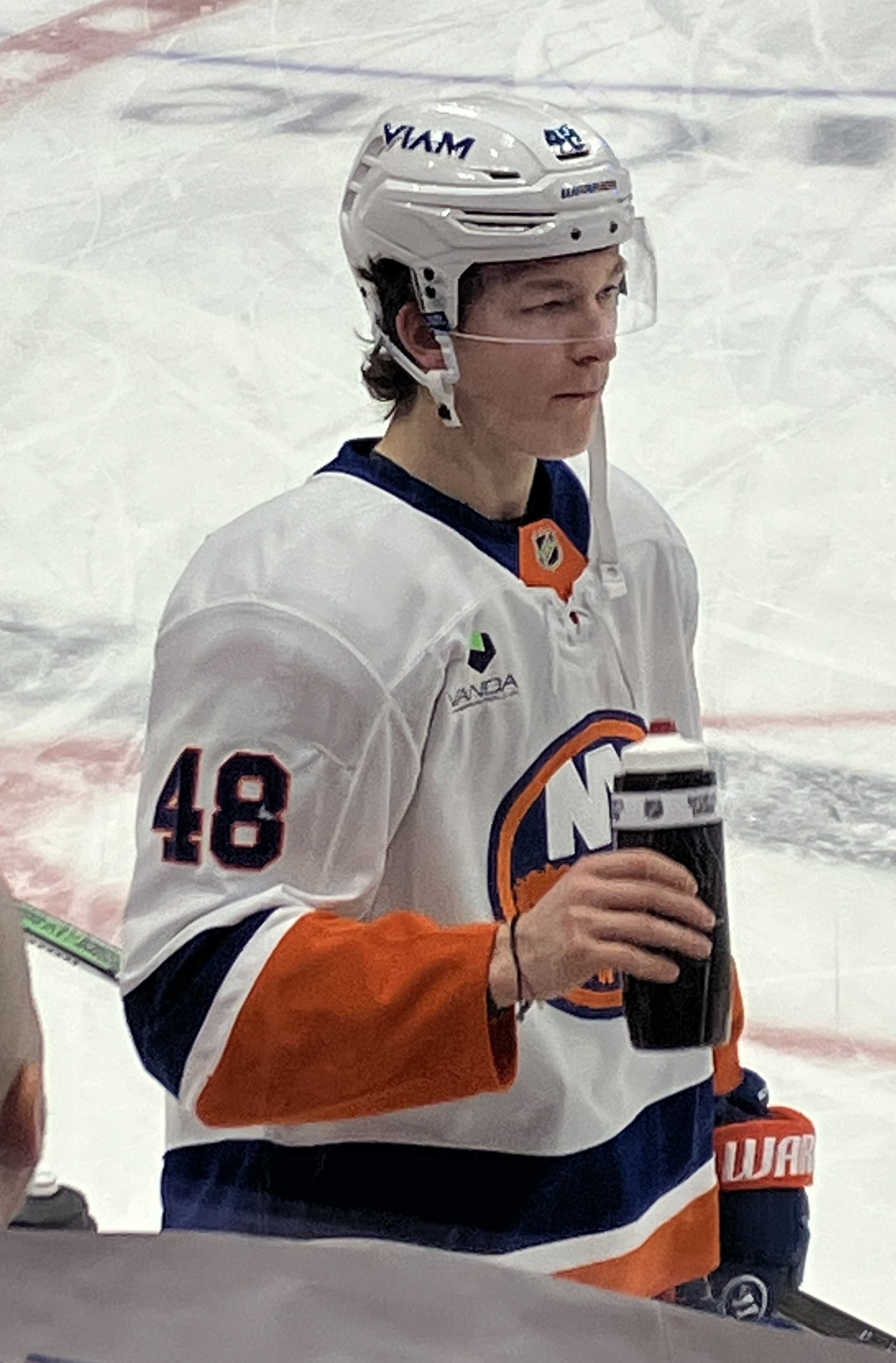
Matthew Schaefer, winner in 2026

== See also ==
- List of National Hockey League awards
- List of NHL players
- List of NHL statistical leaders
