= Carl Voss =

American ice hockey player

- Hockey Hall of Fame, 1974 (Builder)
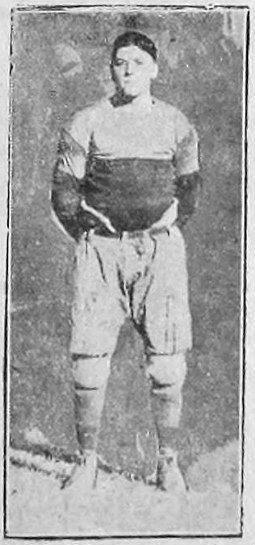
- Voss in 1924 in football outfit while at Queen's University.
- Born: January 6, 1907 Chelsea, Massachusetts, U.S.
- Died: September 13, 1993 (aged 86) Lake Park, Florida, U.S.
- Height: 5 ft 7 in (170 cm)
- Weight: 160 lb (73 kg; 11 st 6 lb)
- Position: Center
- Shot: Left
- Played for: Toronto Maple Leafs; New York Rangers; Detroit Red Wings; Ottawa Senators; St. Louis Eagles; New York Americans; Montreal Maroons; Chicago Black Hawks
- Playing career: 1926–1938

Carl Potter Voss (January 6, 1907 – September 13, 1993) was an American ice hockey forward in the National Hockey League (NHL). He played for several teams between 1926 and 1938. He later became a referee, and was inducted into the Hockey Hall of Fame in 1974 as a builder.

== Playing career ==
Voss was born in Chelsea, Massachusetts, while his father Charles (a Toronto native) was working there as a lithographer. The family moved back to Canada when he was a teenager, and Carl attended Riverdale Collegiate Institute before entering Queen's University in 1924. In 1925-26, Voss helped Queen's University's hockey team reach the Memorial Cup finals, where they lost 2-1 to the Calgary Canadians. After a short stint with the Toronto Marlboros in the Ontario Hockey Association, Voss was signed in 1926-27 by Conn Smythe of the Toronto Maple Leafs of the National Hockey League. He played only 14 games with the Leafs as he spent much of his time in the minors for five years. Voss was a leading player with Toronto's affiliate teams. He played in the Canadian Professional Hockey League with the Toronto Falcons and the London Panthers and the Buffalo Bisons of the International Hockey League. Voss led the Bisons to back-to-back-to-back championships in 1930-31 and 1931-32. He led the IHL in scoring in 1931-32 and was named to the First All-Star Team.

In 1932-33, Voss finally earned a full-time NHL roster spot with the New York Rangers. Ten games in, he was sold to the Detroit Red Wings and he had a great season, scoring 20 points in 38 games. Voss became the league's first rookie of the year award winner that season. In 1933-34, he played eight games with the Red Wings before being traded to the Ottawa Senators for cash and player Cooney Weiland. From then on, he was traded back and forth in the NHL. He saw action with the St. Louis Eagles, New York Americans, and the Montreal Maroons before settling in with the Chicago Blackhawks in 1937-38. He helped the Blackhawks reach the Stanley Cup Final that season and scored the Stanley Cup-winning goal in game four against the Toronto Maple Leafs. With that, Voss won his first Stanley Cup. Next season, he injured his knee in training camp and the injury ended his career. Voss retired in 1938 after playing in 261 NHL games.

== Football ==
Few realize that Voss was also an excellent football player. While at university he played 4 seasons (1924 to 1927) with the Queen's Golden Gaels. This included a victory in the 1924 12th Grey Cup. Voss has his name engraved on the Grey Cup for this season.

This makes Voss, along with Lionel Conacher and Joe Miller, one of only three players to have their name engraved on both the Stanley Cup and the Grey Cup; Leo Dandurand won Stanley Cup as owner Montreal Canadiens 1924 (also Manager), 1930–31 and Grey Cup Montreal Allouettes 1949 President (also Owner); Harold Ballard won Stanley cups with the Toronto Maple Leafs in 1962-63-64-67 as co-owner/Vice President, and Grey Cup 1986 with the Hamilton Tiger-Cats as owner/president. Normie Kwong is on the Grey Cup as a player four times and on the Stanley Cup once as an owner/general manager, while Wayne Gretzky is on the Stanley Cup as a player four times and once on the Grey Cup as an owner.

== Post-playing career ==
After retirement, Voss joined the U.S. branch of the Canadian Cycle and Motor Company (CCM). For the next ten years, he was its principal agent associated with hockey teams across the United States. He also served as a referee during his stay with the CCM in the American Hockey League, California Hockey League, and at various college games. Eventually Voss moved up the ranks of hockey administration and replaced Jim Hendy of the United States Hockey League. He also became a consultant to on-ice officials. After the USHL suspended operations in 1951, he joined the St. Louis Flyers of the AHL as manager and coach while continuing to work as a consultant to on-ice officials. His administrative qualities caught the eyes of the National Hockey League and he was offered the job of referee-in-chief of the NHL. During his 15-year tenures as referee-in-chief he implemented a wide range of changes to the league's officiating structure. Voss scouted the minor leagues for potential NHL officials and under his watch, the number of on-ice officials increased from 10 to 23. He was inducted into the Hockey Hall of Fame in 1974 as a builder for his contribution to ice hockey.

== Awards and achievements ==
- Grey Cup champion 1924.
- IHL champion in 1931 and 1932.
- Selected to the IHL First All-Star Team in 1932.
- IHL leading point scorer in 1932.
- Calder Memorial Trophy winner in 1933.
- Stanley Cup champion in 1938
- Inducted into the Hockey Hall of Fame in 1974 as a builder.

== Career statistics ==
=== Regular season and playoffs ===
			Regular season					Playoffs
Season	Team	League	GP	G	A	Pts	PIM	GP	G	A	Pts	PIM
1924–25	Queen's University	LOVHL	—	—	—	—	—	—	—	—	—	—
1925–26	Kingston Frontenacs	OHA-Sr.	—	—	—	—	—	—	—	—	—	—
1926–27	Toronto Marlboros	OHA-Jr.	6	0	0	0	—	2	0	1	1	—
1926–27	Toronto Maple Leafs	NHL	12	0	0	0	0	—	—	—	—	—
1927–28	Toronto Falcons	Can-Pro	23	3	4	7	15	2	0	0	0	2
1928–29	Toronto Maple Leafs	NHL	2	0	0	0	0	—	—	—	—	—
1928–29	London Panthers	Can-Pro	42	11	9	20	44	—	—	—	—	—
1929–30	Buffalo Bisons	IHL	42	14	8	22	22	7	3	0	3	6
1930–31	Buffalo Bisons	IHL	47	16	10	26	46	6	3	3	6	8
1931–32	Buffalo Bisons	IHL	46	18	23	41	53	6	1	5	6	7
1932–33	New York Rangers	NHL	10	2	1	3	4	—	—	—	—	—
1932–33	Detroit Red Wings	NHL	38	6	14	20	6	4	1	1	2	0
1933–34	Detroit Red Wings	NHL	8	0	2	2	2	—	—	—	—	—
1933–34	Ottawa Senators	NHL	40	7	16	23	10	—	—	—	—	—
1934–35	St. Louis Eagles	NHL	48	13	18	31	14	—	—	—	—	—
1935–36	New York Americans	NHL	46	3	9	12	10	5	0	0	0	0
1936–37	Montreal Maroons	NHL	20	0	2	2	4	5	1	0	1	0
1937–38	Montreal Maroons	NHL	3	0	0	0	0	—	—	—	—	—
1937–38	Chicago Black Hawks	NHL	34	3	8	11	0	10	2	3	5	0
IHL totals			135	48	41	89	121	19	7	8	15	21
NHL totals			261	34	70	104	50	24	5	3	8	0

== Transactions ==
- February 16, 1927 – Signed as a free agent by the Toronto Maple Leafs.
- October 10, 1929 - Traded to the Buffalo Bisons by the Toronto Maple Leafs with Wes King for Gord Brydson.
- October 4, 1932 - Traded to the New York Rangers by the Buffalo Bisons for Lorne Carr and $15,000.
- December 11, 1932 - Traded to the Detroit Red Wings by the New York Rangers for cash.
- November 26, 1933 - Traded to the Ottawa Senators by the Detroit Red Wings with cash for Cooney Weiland.
- September 22, 1934 - Transferred to the St. Louis Eagles after the Ottawa Senators franchise relocated.
- October 15, 1935 - Claimed by the Detroit Red Wings from the St. Louis Eagles in Dispersal draft.
- October 16, 1935 - Traded to the New York Americans by the Detroit Red Wings for Pete Kelly.
- September 6, 1936 - Traded to the Montreal Maroons by the New York Americans for Joe Lamb and $10,000.
- December 6, 1937 - Signed as a free agent by the Chicago Blackhawks.
- September 30, 1938 - Suffered career-ending knee injury in training camp.

Preceded by New Award	NHL Rookie of the Year; 1933	Succeeded by Russ Blinco
