= Art Wiebe =

Canadian ice hockey player

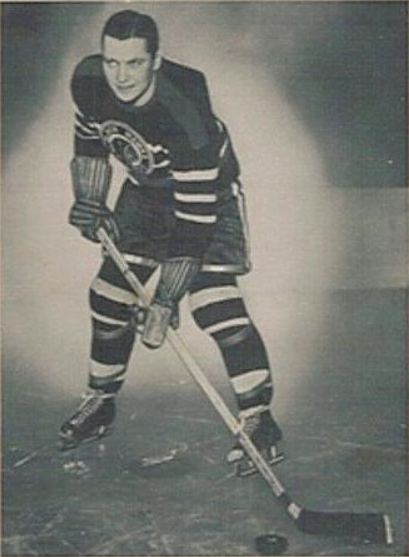
- Born: September 28, 1912 Rosthern, Saskatchewan, Canada
- Died: June 6, 1971 (aged 58) Edmonton, Alberta, Canada
- Height: 5 ft 10 in (178 cm)
- Weight: 180 lb (82 kg; 12 st 12 lb)
- Position: Defence
- Shot: Left
- Played for: Chicago Black Hawks
- Playing career: 1932–1944

Walter Arthur Ronald Wiebe (September 28, 1912 – June 6, 1971) was a Canadian ice hockey player who played 412 games in the National Hockey League with the Chicago Black Hawks from 1933 to 1944. He won the Stanley Cup with Chicago in 1938. Wiebe was born in Rosthern, Saskatchewan and raised in Vermilion, Alberta.

== Career statistics ==
=== Regular season and playoffs ===
			Regular season					Playoffs
Season	Team	League	GP	G	A	Pts	PIM	GP	G	A	Pts	PIM
1930–31	Edmonton Poolers	EJrHL	10	0	1	1	6	—	—	—	—	—
1931–32	Edmonton Poolers	AHAA	10	2	2	4	—	2	1	0	1	0
1931–32	Edmonton Poolers	M-Cup	—	—	—	—	—	5	0	0	0	6
1932–33	Chicago Black Hawks	NHL	4	0	0	0	0	—	—	—	—	—
1932–33	St. Paul Greyhounds	AHA	16	0	0	0	10	—	—	—	—	—
1933–34	Kansas City Greyhounds	AHA	15	1	1	2	9	4	0	0	0	)
1934–35	Chicago Black Hawks	NHL	42	2	1	3	27	2	0	0	0	2
1935–36	Chicago Black Hawks	NHL	46	1	0	1	25	2	0	0	0	0
1936–37	Chicago Black Hawks	NHL	43	0	2	2	6	—	—	—	—	—
1937–38	Chicago Black Hawks	NHL	43	0	2	2	24	10	0	1	1	2
1938–39	Chicago Black Hawks	NHL	47	1	2	3	24	—	—	—	—	—
1939–40	Chicago Black Hawks	NHL	42	2	2	4	20	2	1	0	1	2
1940–41	Chicago Black Hawks	NHL	45	3	2	5	28	4	0	0	0	0
1941–42	Chicago Black Hawks	NHL	44	2	4	6	20	3	0	0	0	0
1942–43	Chicago Black Hawks	NHL	33	1	7	8	25	—	—	—	—	—
1943–44	Chicago Black Hawks	NHL	23	2	4	6	2	8	0	2	2	4
NHL totals			412	14	26	40	201	31	1	3	4	10
