= Cully Dahlstrom =

American ice hockey player

- Born: July 3, 1912 Minneapolis, Minnesota, USA
- Died: December 19, 1998 (aged 86)
- Height: 5 ft 10 in (178 cm)
- Weight: 172 lb (78 kg; 12 st 4 lb)
- Position: Center
- Shot: Left
- Played for: Chicago Black Hawks
- Playing career: 1937–1945

Carl Sidney "Cully" Dahlstrom (July 3, 1912 — December 19, 1998) was an American professional ice hockey center who played eight seasons in the National Hockey League (NHL) for the Chicago Black Hawks between 1937 and 1945. He won the Calder Memorial Trophy as the league's top rookie for the 1937–38 season and won the Stanley Cup in the same season. He played 342 career NHL games, scoring 88 goals and 118 assists for 206 points. In 1973 he was elected to the United States Hockey Hall of Fame.

== Playing career ==
Dahlstrom began his playing career at Minneapolis South High School, after which he went on to play professionally in the Central Hockey League (CHL) with the Minneapolis Millers. Following his second season with the Millers, Dahlstrom made his first attempt at becoming a National Hockey League (NHL) player when he was invited to Boston Bruins training camp. He failed to make the team. He returned to the Millers and had his best season with the team, scoring 28 points in 43 games. Following his third year with Minneapolis he joined the St. Paul Saints and improved his point total to 36, playing 44 games. At season's end he was named a Second Team CHL All-Star. The following season the Saints changed leagues, joining the American Hockey Association (AHA). In his first year in the AHA Dahlstrom scored 20 goals and 43 points in 46 games. He was named an AHA First Team All-Star. During this time Frederic McLaughlin was scouting the AHA for American talent for the NHL's Chicago Black Hawks. Initially McLaughlin was interested in Dahlstrom's teammate, Oscar Hanson, but Black Hawks' coach Bill Stewart persuaded him to sign Dahlstrom. Dahlstrom attended the Hawks training camp in 1936 but did not make the team. He played one more season with the Saints before being selected by the Black Hawks in an Inter-League Draft on May 9, 1937.

Dahlstrom made his NHL debut in the 1937–38 season. In his rookie year he scored 10 goals and 19 points in 48 games and was awarded the Calder Memorial Trophy as the NHL's rookie of the year, becoming the first American born player to win the award. That season Chicago finished with a 14–25–9 recorded, but still managed to earn a playoff berth, finishing two points ahead of the Detroit Red Wings in the American Division. In the first round of the playoffs the Black Hawks defeated the Montreal Canadiens in a three game series 2–1. The second round featured the Black Hawks facing off against the New York Americans. After losing the opening game, Chicago faced elimination as game two went into double overtime tied 0–0. Then at the 13:01 mark of the second overtime Dahlstrom scored, giving Chicago the win. The Black Hawks went on to win the following game, advancing to the Stanley Cup Final. In the Finals the Black Hawks faced the heavily favored Toronto Maple Leafs. Chicago took a 2–1 series lead. In game 4 Dahlstrom scored the first goal in a 4–1 win to capture the Stanley Cup, becoming the "most improbable" championship team in NHL history. Dahlstrom was one of a record eight American-born players on the championship team, a record that stood until 1995.

Over the next three seasons he averaged 25 points in 44 games. Entering the 1940–41 playoffs the Black Hawks had not won a playoff round since their Stanley Cup victory. Chicago and Montreal played in the first round with the teams splitting the first two games of the series. The third game decided the series; in that game Dahlstrom scored two goals, helping Chicago to the 3–2 victory. Chicago was eliminated in the next round by Detroit. Three years later during the 1943–44 season Dahlstrom notched his first career hat-trick in a game vs. the New York Rangers. Three months later he recorded his second and final career hat-trick, again against the Rangers. The season proved to be Dahlstrom's most successful as he set career highs in games played, goals, assists, and points. The success did not last as he tied his career low in points during the 1944–45 season. Following the end of the season he was traded to the Seattle Ironmen in the Pacific Coast Hockey League (PCHL) for cash. He never played a game for Seattle as he chose to retire following the 1944–45 season. In 1973 Dahlstrom was elected to the United States Hockey Hall of Fame as part of the inaugural class. On December 19, 1998 Dahlstrom died at age 86.

== Career statistics ==
=== Regular season and playoffs ===
			Regular season					Playoffs
Season	Team	League	GP	G	A	Pts	PIM	GP	G	A	Pts	PIM
1931–32	Minneapolis Millers	CHL	30	9	1	10	10	—	—	—	—	—
1932–33	Minneapolis Millers	CHL	27	3	9	12	27	7	1	0	1	0
1933–34	Minneapolis Millers	CHL	43	13	15	28	20	3	2	4	6	0
1934–35	St. Paul Saints	CHL	44	16	20	36	30	8	3	0	3	2
1935–36	St. Paul Saints	AHA	46	20	23	43	26	—	—	—	—	—
1936–37	St. Paul Saints	AHA	47	23	19	42	25	—	—	—	—	—
1937–38	Chicago Black Hawks	NHL	48	10	9	19	11	10	3	1	4	2
1938–39	Chicago Black Hawks	NHL	48	6	14	20	2	—	—	—	—	—
1939–40	Chicago Black Hawks	NHL	45	11	19	30	15	2	0	0	0	0
1940–41	Chicago Black Hawks	NHL	40	11	14	25	6	5	3	3	6	2
1941–42	Chicago Black Hawks	NHL	33	13	14	27	6	3	0	0	0	0
1942–43	Chicago Black Hawks	NHL	38	11	13	24	10	—	—	—	—	—
1943–44	Chicago Black Hawks	NHL	50	20	22	42	8	9	0	4	4	6
1944–45	Chicago Black Hawks	NHL	40	6	13	19	0	—	—	—	—	—
NHL totals			342	88	118	206	58	29	6	8	14	10

== Awards and achievements ==
- Selected to the CHL Second All-Star Team in 1935.
- Selected to the AHA First All-Star Team in 1936.
- Calder Memorial Trophy winner in 1938.
- Stanley Cup champion in 1938.
- Inducted into the United States Hockey Hall of Fame in 1973.

Preceded by Syl Apps	Winner of the Calder Memorial Trophy; 1938	Succeeded by Frank Brimsek
