= Jack Shill =

Canadian ice hockey player

- Born: January 12, 1913 Toronto, Ontario, Canada
- Died: October 25, 1976 (aged 63)
- Height: 5 ft 11 in (180 cm)
- Weight: 180 lb (82 kg; 12 st 12 lb)
- Position: Left wing
- Shot: Right
- Played for: Toronto Maple Leafs; Boston Bruins; Chicago Black Hawks; New York Americans
- Playing career: 1932–1948

John Walker Shill (January 12, 1913 — October 25, 1976) was a Canadian ice hockey forward who played 6 seasons in the National Hockey League for the Toronto Maple Leafs, Boston Bruins, New York Americans and Chicago Black Hawks from 1933 to 1939. He won the Stanley Cup in 1938 with Chicago.

== Life and career ==
In 1936 Jack was #97 in the O-Pee-Chee line of trading cards.

While playing for the Boston Bruins in 1942 he was part of the "New Kid Line" alongside Don Gallinger and Bep Guidolin. He wore sweater #9 in Boston.

His Toronto Maple Leaf sweater was #1, while he wore #3 for the Chicago Black Hawks.

Prematurely balding, Jack's nickname in the NHL was "Snowball". His brother Bill also played in the NHL. Many of his neighbours became NHL stars including Lionel Conacher who had nearby Cotingham Park renamed in his honour.

Jack was born in Toronto, Ontario and married to Margaret Loreen Jeffrey and had one daughter, Joanne Shill. After retirement from hockey he worked for the City of Toronto. Both Jack and Margaret died in 1976 and are buried at Mt. Pleasant Cemetery, Toronto.

== Career statistics ==
=== Regular season and playoffs ===
			Regular season					Playoffs
Season	Team	League	GP	G	A	Pts	PIM	GP	G	A	Pts	PIM
1929–30	Toronto Marlboros	OHA	1	0	0	0	0	—	—	—	—	—
1930–31	Toronto Marlboros	OHA	8	5	3	8	19	2	1	1	2	6
1931–32	Toronto Marlboros	OHA	10	12	4	16	31	4	1	0	1	2
1931–32	Toronto Marlboros	OHA Sr	—	—	—	—	—	1	0	0	0	0
1932–33	Toronto Marlboros	OHA	3	3	1	4	6	—	—	—	—	—
1932–33	Toronto Marlboros	OHA Sr	11	5	1	6	18	2	0	0	0	8
1933–34	Toronto Maple Leafs	NHL	7	0	1	1	0	2	0	0	0	0
1933–34	Toronto Marlboros	OHA Sr	22	15	10	25	34	2	1	0	1	2
1933–34	Toronto British Consols	TMHL	8	3	3	6	36	—	—	—	—	—
1934–35	Boston Bruins	NHL	45	4	4	8	22	2	0	0	0	0
1934–35	Boston Cubs	Can-Am	6	2	2	4	4	—	—	—	—	—
1935–36	Toronto Maple Leafs	NHL	3	0	1	1	0	9	0	3	3	8
1935–36	Syracuse Stars	IHL	46	20	20	40	82	1	0	0	0	0
1936–37	Toronto Maple Leafs	NHL	32	4	4	8	26	2	0	0	0	0
1937–38	New York Americans	NHL	25	1	3	4	10	—	—	—	—	—
1937–38	Chicago Black Hawks	NHL	20	4	3	7	8	10	1	3	4	15
1938–39	Chicago Black Hawks	NHL	28	2	4	6	4	—	—	—	—	—
1939–40	Providence Reds	IAHL	50	14	26	40	51	8	3	7	10	2
1940–41	Providence Reds	AHL	41	16	22	38	20	3	1	0	1	9
1941–42	Providence Reds	AHL	55	18	28	46	17	—	—	—	—	—
1942–43	Toronto Research Colonels	TIHL	2	0	0	0	0	—	—	—	—	—
1942–43	Toronto Dehavillands	TNDHL	9	7	4	11	15	13	11	18	29	18
1943–44	Toronto Tip Tops	TIHL	21	20	15	35	5	—	—	—	—	—
1945–46	Toronto Maher Jewels	TIHL	33	30	33	63	26	10	5	15	20	8
1946–47	Toronto Maher Jewels	TIHL	28	9	19	28	7	—	—	—	—	—
1947–48	Toronto Maher Jewels	TIHL	6	4	2	6	2	—	—	—	—	—
NHL totals			160	15	20	35	70	25	1	6	7	23

== Awards and achievements ==
- 1938 Stanley Cup Championship (Chicago)
