= Syl Apps =

Canadian ice hockey player and politician (1915–1998)

Syl Apps CM
- Hockey Hall of Fame, 1961
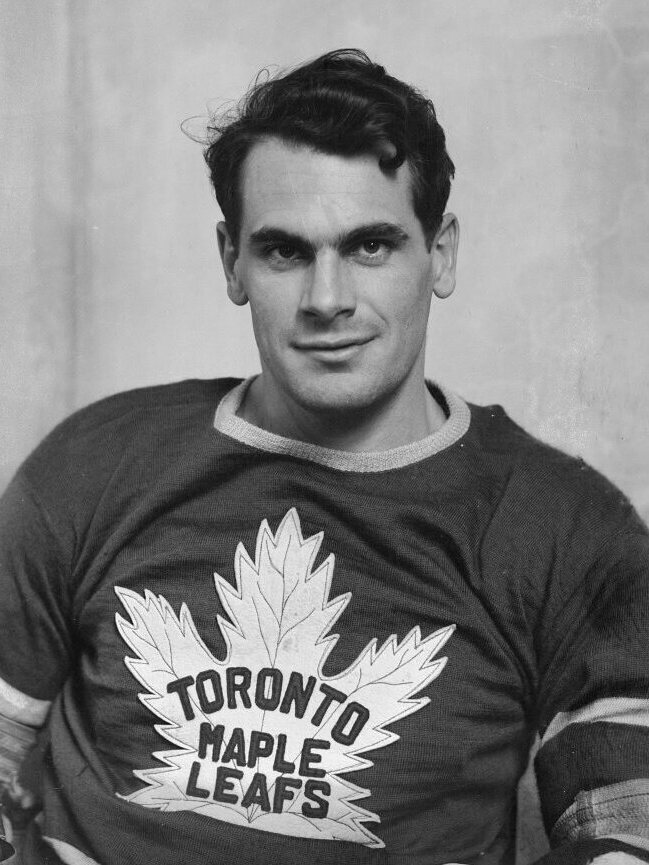
- Apps with the Toronto Maple Leafs in 1939
- Born: January 18, 1915 Paris, Ontario, Canada
- Died: December 24, 1998 (aged 83) Kingston, Ontario, Canada
- Height: 6 ft 0 in (183 cm)
- Weight: 185 lb (84 kg; 13 st 3 lb)
- Position: Centre
- Shot: Left
- Played for: Toronto Maple Leafs
- Playing career: 1936–1948
Medal record
Men's athletics
British Empire Games
Gold medal – first place	1934 London	Pole vault

Minister of Correctional Services
- In office 1971–1974
- Premier: Bill Davis
- Preceded by: Allan Grossman
- Succeeded by: Richard Potter

Ontario MPP
- In office 1963–1975
- Preceded by: William McAdam Nickle
- Succeeded by: Keith Norton
- Constituency: Kingston, 1963–1967; Kingston and the Islands, 1967–1975

Personal details
- Party: National Government (Federal); Progressive Conservative (Provincial)

Military service
- Allegiance: Canada
- Branch/service: Canadian Army
- Years of service: 1943–1945
- Battles/wars: World War II

Charles Joseph Sylvanus Apps CM (January 18, 1915 – December 24, 1998), was a Canadian professional ice hockey player for the Toronto Maple Leafs from 1936 to 1948, an Olympic pole vaulter and a Conservative Member of Provincial Parliament in Ontario. In 2017 Apps was named one of the '100 Greatest NHL Players' in history.

== Athletic career ==
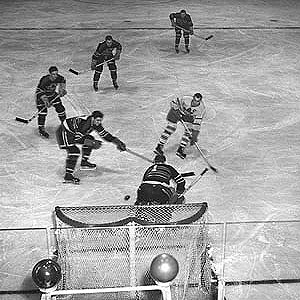
1940s action shot of Apps against four Chicago Black Hawks players and goalie

Apps was a strong athlete, six feet tall, weighing 185 pounds, and won the gold medal at the 1934 British Empire Games in the pole vault competition. Two years later he represented Canada at the 1936 Olympics in Berlin, Germany, where he placed sixth in the pole vault event. After watching him play football at McMaster University (where Apps was majoring in Economics), Conn Smythe signed Apps to play hockey with the Toronto Maple Leafs.

Apps played centre position with the Toronto Maple Leafs for his entire professional hockey career. His jersey number was 10. He was the winner of the first Calder Memorial Trophy in 1937, and the 1942 Lady Byng Memorial Trophy. Apps served as the Maple Leafs captain during the first National Hockey League All-Star Game October 13, 1947, at Maple Leaf Gardens. He also played for an all-star team competing in Montreal on October 29, 1939, to raise money for Babe Siebert's family.

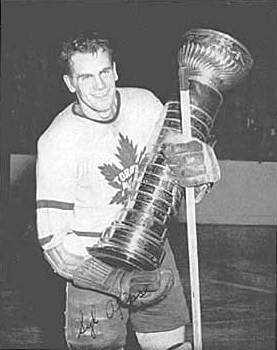
Apps in 1942

Apps was in the prime of his career when he joined the Canadian Army during World War II at the end of the 1943 season. He served two years until the war was over, whereupon he returned to captain the Leafs, winning two more Stanley Cups in 1947 and 1948.

Apps contemplated retirement following the 1947 Stanley Cup win, but returned in order to reach the 200 career goals milestone. With 196 career goals heading into the final weekend of the regular season, Apps scored five goals in the two weekend games to surpass his goal. Despite scoring 53 points in 55 games and setting a career high in goals, Apps retired from the NHL at the age of 33 and took a marketing job with the Simpson's department store. At the same time, he also served as the Ontario Athletic Commissioner.

== Politics ==
While still playing hockey, Apps ran for parliament in the 1940 federal election. He was a candidate in the riding of Brant for the National Government Party but lost to incumbent George Wood of the Liberals by 138 votes.

Apps was a Progressive Conservative member of the Legislative Assembly of Ontario from 1963 to 1975. He represented the riding of Kingston from 1963 to 1967 and Kingston and the Islands from 1967 to 1975. He served as the Minister of Correctional Services from 1971 to 1974.

== Death ==
On December 24, 1998, Apps died from a heart attack and was buried in Mountview Cemetery in Cambridge, Ontario. After his death, the Maple Leafs honoured his jersey number and George Armstrong's number, who both wore the number 10. Their numbers were not retired, as the Maple Leafs had a policy of only retiring numbers for players "who have made a significant contribution to the Toronto Maple Leaf Hockey Club and have experienced a career-ending incident while a member of the Maple Leaf team". However, this policy was changed for the Maple Leafs' centennial season, with Apps's number, along with 15 others, officially being retired on October 15, 2016.

== Legacy ==
Apps was known for his athleticism, character, skating and play-making abilities (alongside a scoring touch, six times reaching the 20 goal plateau). He has been praised by Maple Leafs alumni, authors, historians and even competitors. Maple Leafs owner Conn Smythe called Apps the greatest player in franchise history, with teammate Howie Meeker noting his strong, consistent play. Ted Kennedy often spoke of his character. Jack Adams, famous for his managerial roles with the Detroit Red Wings, stated that Apps was the greatest centre he had ever seen. Boston Bruins legend Milt Schmidt called Apps the greatest player he ever played against, as did Ted Lindsay in relation to the centre position and gentlemanly characteristics.

In 1975, he was elected to Canada's Sports Hall of Fame and two years later Apps was made a Member of the Order of Canada.

Several institutions are named for him, including the Syl and Molly Apps Research Centre in Kingston, Ontario, and the Syl Apps Youth Centre in Oakville, Ontario. The sports arena in his home town of Paris is named the Syl Apps Community Centre.

In 1997, Syl Apps was inducted into the Ontario Sports Hall of Fame. Unveiled by the Ontario Sports Hall of Fame on January 13, 1998, the Syl Apps Award is emblematic of Ontario's Athlete of the Year.

In 2001, Canada Post included Apps in a series of NHL All-Star 47-cent postage stamps.

The National Hockey League itself listed Apps as one of the 100 Greatest Players to ever play in the league as part of the league's centennial celebrations in 2017.

== Family ==
Apps and wife Mary Josephine had five children, Joanne, Robert, Carol, Janet and son Syl Apps Jr. (the latter also played in the NHL). His granddaughter (and daughter of Syl Jr.) Gillian Apps won the gold medal in the 2006 Winter Olympics, the 2010 Winter Olympics, and the 2014 Winter Olympics for Canada's women's ice hockey team, and his grandson Syl Apps III was a college hockey star at Princeton University and played four years in the minor leagues. His grandson Darren Barber won a gold medal at the 1992 Barcelona Olympics in the men's 8 in rowing. Barber is now a family doctor in Peterborough, Ontario. Another cousin, whose grandparents had settled in Manitoba, was Murray Dryden; his sons Dave Dryden and Ken Dryden were NHL Goalkeepers.

== NHL awards and achievements ==
- Calder Memorial Trophy winner in 1937.
- Selected to the NHL Second All-Star Team in 1938, 1941, and 1943.
- Selected to the NHL First All-Star Team in 1939, and 1942.
- Lady Byng Memorial Trophy winner in 1942.
- Stanley Cup champion in 1942, 1947, and 1948.
- Inducted into the Hockey Hall of Fame in 1961.
- Inducted into Canada's Sports Hall of Fame in 1975.
- In 1998, he was ranked number 33 on The Hockey News' list of the 100 Greatest Hockey Players.
- #10 jersey retired by the Toronto Maple Leafs.
- In January 2017, Apps was part of the first group of players to be named one of the '100 Greatest NHL Players' in history.

== Career statistics ==
			Regular season					Playoffs
Season	Team	League	GP	G	A	Pts	PIM	GP	G	A	Pts	PIM
1930–31	Paris Green	OHA-Jr.	7	5	1	6	0	—	—	—	—	—
1935–36	Hamilton Tigers	OHA-Sr.	19	22	16	38	10	9	12	7	19	4
1935–36	Toronto Dominions	OHA-Sr.	1	0	1	1	0	—	—	—	—	—
1935–36	Hamilton Tigers	A-Cup	—	—	—	—	—	4	5	4	9	2
1936–37	Toronto Maple Leafs	NHL	48	16	29	45	10	2	0	1	1	0
1937–38	Toronto Maple Leafs	NHL	47	21	29	50	9	7	1	4	5	0
1938–39	Toronto Maple Leafs	NHL	44	15	25	40	4	10	2	6	8	2
1939–40	Toronto Maple Leafs	NHL	27	13	17	30	5	10	5	2	7	2
1940–41	Toronto Maple Leafs	NHL	41	20	24	44	6	5	3	2	5	2
1941–42	Toronto Maple Leafs	NHL	38	18	23	41	0	13	5	9	14	2
1942–43	Toronto Maple Leafs	NHL	29	23	17	40	2	—	—	—	—	—
1945–46	Toronto Maple Leafs	NHL	40	24	16	40	2	—	—	—	—	—
1946–47	Toronto Maple Leafs	NHL	54	25	24	49	6	11	5	1	6	0
1947–48	Toronto Maple Leafs	NHL	55	26	27	53	12	9	4	4	8	0
NHL totals			423	201	231	432	56	67	25	29	54	14

== Electoral record ==
1940 Canadian federal election: Brant
Party	Candidate	Votes	%	±%
Liberal	George Wood	4,657	50.8	+6.3
National Government	Syl Apps	4,519	49.2	+12.1
Total valid votes		9,176	100.0	

Note: "National Government" vote is compared to Conservative vote in 1935 election.

1963 Ontario general election: Kingston
Party	Candidate	Votes	%	±%
Progressive Conservative	Syl Apps	10,092	49.11	–7.41
Liberal	William T. Mills	9,068	44.13	+5.98
New Democratic	Lavada Pinder	1,389	6.76	+1.44
Total valid votes		20,549	99.17	
Total rejected ballots		171	0.83	–0.47
Turnout		20,720	68.40	+4.66
Eligible voters		30,294		
Progressive Conservative hold		Swing		–6.70
Source: Elections Ontario

1967 Ontario general election: Kingston and the Islands
Party	Candidate	Votes	%
Progressive Conservative	Syl Apps	10,246	47.12
Liberal	Keith A. Flannigan	7,881	36.24
New Democratic	John Meister	3,617	16.63
Total valid votes		21,744	99.36
Total rejected ballots		140	0.64
Turnout		21,884	66.05
Eligible voters		33,130	
Progressive Conservative pickup new district.			
Source: Elections Ontario

1971 Ontario general election: Kingston and the Islands
Party	Candidate	Votes	%	±%
Progressive Conservative	Syl Apps	12,285	43.92	–3.20
Liberal	John W. Hazlett	12,098	43.25	+7.01
New Democratic	Mary Lloyd-Jones	3,587	12.82	–3.81
Total valid votes		27,970	99.42	
Total rejected ballots		163	0.58	–0.06
Turnout		28,133	68.30	+2.25
Eligible voters		41,189		
Progressive Conservative hold		Swing		–5.10
Source: Elections Ontario

Note: Apps appeared on Provincial election ballots as his legal first, middle, and last name.

== See also ==
- List of NHL players who spent their entire career with one franchise

Davis ministry, Province of Ontario (1971–1985)
Cabinet post (1)
Predecessor	Office	Successor
Allan Grossman	Minister of Correctional Services; 1971–1974	Richard Potter

Sporting positions
Preceded by Red Horner	Toronto Maple Leafs captain 1940–1943	Succeeded by Bob Davidson
Preceded by Bob Davidson	Toronto Maple Leafs captain 1945–1948	Succeeded by Ted Kennedy
Awards
Preceded by Rookie of the Year; Mike Karakas	Winner of the Calder Memorial Trophy; 1937	Succeeded by Cully Dahlstrom
Preceded by Bobby Bauer	Winner of the Lady Byng Trophy; 1942	Succeeded by Max Bentley
