= Johnny Gottselig =

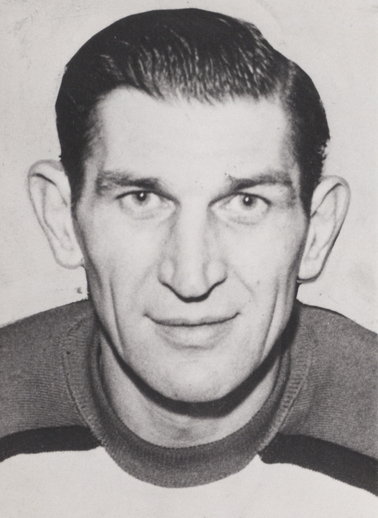
- Born: June 24, 1905 Klosterdorf, Russian Empire
- Died: May 15, 1986 (aged 80) Chicago, Illinois, U.S.
- Height: 5 ft 11 in (180 cm)
- Weight: 158 lb (72 kg; 11 st 4 lb)
- Position: Left wing
- Shot: Left
- Played for: Winnipeg Maroons; Chicago Black Hawks; Kansas City Americans
- Playing career: 1928–1945

Johannes "Johnny" Gottselig (Russian: Иван Гоцелиг) (June 24, 1905 – May 15, 1986) was a professional ice hockey left winger who played 16 seasons for the Chicago Black Hawks of the National Hockey League (NHL) between 1928 and 1945. He was the second player born in the Russian Empire to play in the NHL. Emil Iverson was the first European-born Chicago Blackhawks head coach in 1932 (Copenhagen, Denmark) and John became the second approximately 13 years later.

He was the second European-born captain of a cup-winning team in the league's history (Scotland-born Charlie Gardiner was the first in 1934). He won two Stanley Cups in his playing career: in 1934, and 1938 (as captain). He was also with Chicago in 1961, as Director of Public Relations, when the Black Hawks won their third Stanley Cup. Gottselig was included on the team, but his name was not engraved onto the Stanley Cup. Gottselig also served as a baseball manager of the All-American Girls Professional Baseball League (AAGPBL), where he won the first championship with the Racine Belles in 1943. He also managed the Peoria Redwings in 1947 and the Kenosha Comets from 1949 to 1950.

== Early life ==
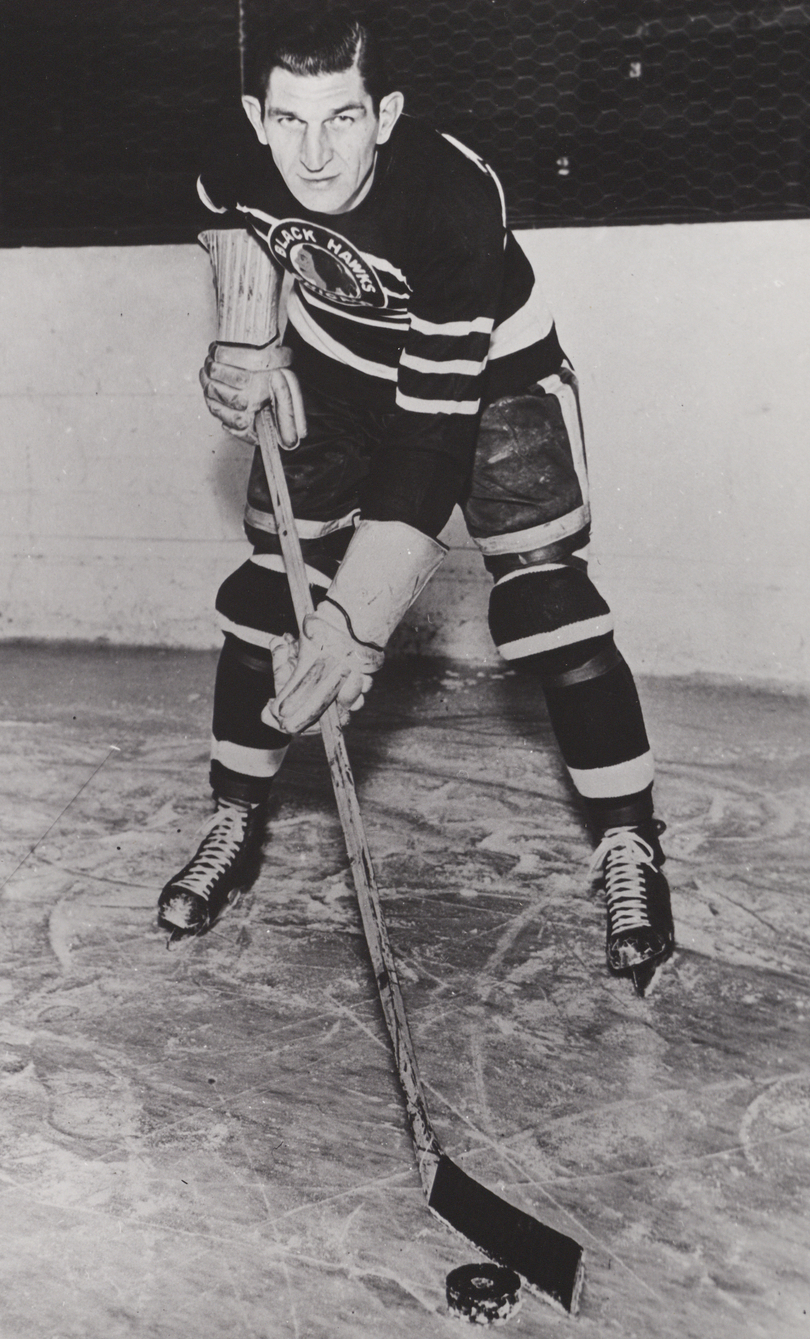
Gottselig with the Chicago Black Hawks

Gottselig was born along the banks of Dnieper River in a tiny German Catholic village of Klosterdorf in the Swedish district in the Kherson Governorate of the Russian Empire and emigrated to Canada the same year. He grew up in Regina, Saskatchewan. In later years, he would say he was from the better-known city of Odessa which was the largest centre in the general vicinity of his birthplace. His parents were Albert Gottselig and Margarethe Weber.

== Career ==
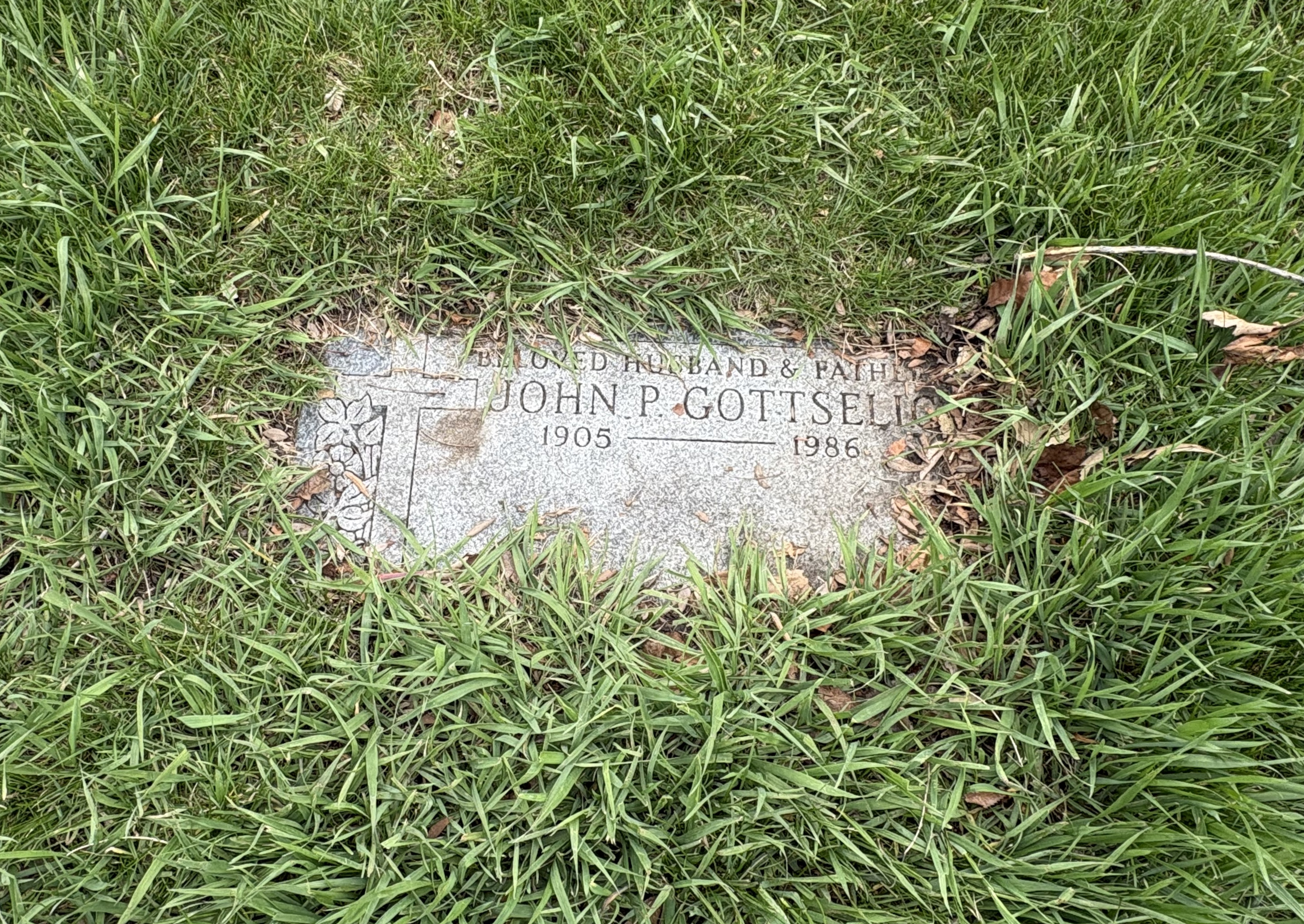
Gottselig's grave at Calvary Cemetery

He played junior hockey with the Regina Pats before joining Chicago. Gottselig's entire NHL career was with Chicago, playing 589 career NHL games, scoring 176 goals and 195 assists for 371 points. After his hockey playing career was finished, he became the team's head coach. After coaching, he stayed on as the team's Director of Public Relations.

Gottselig also served for several years as a manager of women's baseball teams in the All-American Girls Professional Baseball League. He guided the Racine Belles in 1943–1944, the Peoria Redwings in 1947 and the Kenosha Comets in 1949–1950. He later became an executive with the Elmhurst Chicago Stone Company.

He died from a heart attack in Chicago on May 15, 1986, and was buried at Calvary Cemetery in Evanston.

== Career statistics ==
			Regular season					Playoffs
Season	Team	League	GP	G	A	Pts	PIM	GP	G	A	Pts	PIM
1923–24	Regina Pats	S-SJHL	6	6	0	6	6	—	—	—	—	—
1924–25	Regina Pats	S-SJHL	5	18	2	20	0	—	—	—	—	—
1924–25	Regina Victorias	S-SSHL	1	1	0	1	2	—	—	—	—	—
1925–26	Regina Victorias	S-SSHL	16	8	1	9	2	—	—	—	—	—
1926–27	Regina Capitals	PrHL	32	23	7	30	21	2	1	0	1	0
1927–28	Winnipeg Maroons	AHA	39	15	4	19	24	—	—	—	—	—
1928–29	Chicago Black Hawks	NHL	44	5	3	8	26	—	—	—	—	—
1929–30	Chicago Black Hawks	NHL	39	21	4	25	28	2	0	0	0	4
1930–31	Chicago Black Hawks	NHL	42	20	12	32	14	9	3	3	6	2
1931–32	Chicago Black Hawks	NHL	44	13	15	28	28	2	0	0	0	2
1932–33	Chicago Black Hawks	NHL	41	11	11	22	6	—	—	—	—	—
1933–34	Chicago Black Hawks	NHL	48	16	14	30	4	8	4	3	7	4
1934–35	Chicago Black Hawks	NHL	48	19	18	37	16	2	0	0	0	0
1935–36	Chicago Black Hawks	NHL	40	14	15	29	4	2	0	2	2	0
1936–37	Chicago Black Hawks	NHL	47	9	21	30	10	—	—	—	—	—
1937–38	Chicago Black Hawks	NHL	48	13	19	32	22	10	5	3	8	4
1938–39	Chicago Black Hawks	NHL	48	16	23	39	15	—	—	—	—	—
1939–40	Chicago Black Hawks	NHL	39	8	15	23	7	2	0	1	1	0
1940–41	Chicago Black Hawks	NHL	5	1	4	5	5	—	—	—	—	—
1940–41	Kansas City Americans	AHA	13	9	6	15	2	8	3	1	4	2
1941–42	Kansas City Americans	AHA	40	25	35	60	22	6	2	5	7	2
1942–43	Chicago Black Hawks	NHL	10	2	6	8	12	—	—	—	—	—
1943–44	Chicago Black Hawks	NHL	45	8	15	23	6	6	1	1	2	2
1944–45	Chicago Black Hawks	NHL	1	0	0	0	0	—	—	—	—	—
NHL totals			589	176	195	371	203	43	13	13	26	18
AHA totals			92	49	45	94	48	14	5	6	11	4

== NHL coaching record ==
Team	Year	Regular season						Postseason
Team	Year	G	W	L	T	Pts	Finish	Result
Chicago Black Hawks	1944–45	49	13	29	7	33	5th in NHL	Missed playoffs
Chicago Black Hawks	1945–46	50	23	20	7	53	3rd in NHL	Lost in semi-finals (0-4 vs. MTL)
Chicago Black Hawks	1946–47	60	19	37	4	42	6th in NHL	Missed playoffs
Chicago Black Hawks	1947–48	28	7	19	2	16	(fired)	—
NHL Total		187	62	105	20	144		0-4 (.000)

== AAGPBL managerial record ==
Team	Year	Regular season					Postseason			
Team	Year	Games	Won	Lost	Win %	Finish	Won	Lost	Win %	Result
Racine Belles	1943	54	30	24	.556	1st in AAGPBL	3	0	1.000	Won AAGPBL championship (3-0 vs. KEN)
Racine Belles	1943	54	29	25	.537	3rd in AAGPBL	3	0	1.000	Won AAGPBL championship (3-0 vs. KEN)
Racine Belles	1944	60	28	32	.467	4th in AAGPBL	–	–	–	–
Racine Belles	1944	57	25	32	.439	5th in AAGPBL	–	–	–	–
Racine total		225	112	113	.498	1 league title	3	0	1.000	1 championship
Peoria Redwings	1947	111	54	57	.486	5th in AAGPBL	–	–	–	–
Peoria total		111	54	57	.486	–	0	0	–	–
Kenosha Comets	1949	113	58	55	.513	4th in AAGPBL	1	3	.250	Lost in AAGPBL quarter-finals (1-3 vs. MUS)
Kenosha Comets	1950	109	63	46	.578	3rd in AAGPBL	1	3	.250	Lost in AAGPBL semi-finals (1-3 vs. RFD)
Kenosha Comets	1951	107	36	71	.336	6th in AAGPBL	–	–	–	–
Kenosha total		329	157	172	.477	–	2	6	.250	–
Total		665	323	342	.486	1 league title	5	6	.455	1 championship

Preceded by Chuck Gardiner	Chicago Black Hawks captain 1935–1940	Succeeded by Earl Seibert
Preceded by Paul Thompson	Head coach of the Chicago Black Hawks; 1944–1947	Succeeded by Charlie Conacher
