= 1937–38 NHL season =

Professional ice hockey league season

- League: National Hockey League
- Sport: Ice hockey
- Duration: November 4, 1937 – April 12, 1938
- Games: 48
- Teams: 8

Regular season
- Season champions: Boston Bruins
- Season MVP: Eddie Shore (Bruins)
- Top scorer: Gordie Drillon (Maple Leafs)
- Canadian Division champions: Toronto Maple Leafs
- American Division champions: Boston Bruins

Stanley Cup
- Champions: Chicago Black Hawks
- Runners-up: Toronto Maple Leafs

NHL seasons
- ← 1936–37 1938–39 →

The 1937–38 NHL season was the 21st season of the National Hockey League (NHL). Eight teams each played 48 games. The Chicago Black Hawks were the Stanley Cup winners as they beat the Toronto Maple Leafs three games to one in the Stanley Cup Finals.

== League business ==
Bill Dwyer could not come up with the capital required to retain his team and the NHL took full control of the New York Americans.

The Howie Morenz Memorial Game, the NHL's second all-star game, was played November 2, 1937, and raised over $11,447, which, added to other contributions, established a fund of over $20,000 for the Morenz family. Prior to the start of the game, Howie Morenz's uniform and playing kit was auctioned and Joseph Cattarinich put down the winning bid of $500. The uniform was presented to Howie Morenz Jr. The NHL All-stars defeated a combined team of Canadiens and Maroons players 6–5.

In February 1938, NHL president Frank Calder terminated the professional-amateur agreement with the Canadian Amateur Hockey Association (CAHA) which limited signing contracts with junior ice hockey players. After a player suspended by the NHL was registered by a CAHA team, he met with CAHA vice-president W. G. Hardy without resolution, then told NHL teams that they could approach any junior player with a contract offer.

=== Rule changes ===
In September 1937, the NHL passed the 'icing' rule whereby teams could no longer shoot the puck the length of the ice to delay the game. Teams were allowed to continue to 'ice' the puck during penalties. The penalty shot was amended to remove the dots where the shot was to take place. Two new lines 30 feet from the goal were added instead. A player taking a penalty shot would start from the line closest to his own goal, skate with the puck and shoot before he crossed the penalty line nearest the opposition goal. After a puck was shot out-of-bounds, the location of the following faceoff was now to occur at the point where the shot was made, instead of where it exited the rink as was done until that time.

== Regular season ==
Charlie Conacher was named captain of the Toronto Maple Leafs, and he had a big weekend at the expense of Chicago November 13 with a hat trick in a 7–3 win. He then scored 2 goals in a 3–3 tie. However, The Big Bomber ran into misfortune once more on November 18 in Montreal against the Canadiens when he dislocated his shoulder. The cycle of injuries had a cumulative effect on Conacher's nervous and physical condition and his doctor told him to retire from hockey. He did retire for the rest of the season, but would play again the next season, but was forever gone from the Leafs.

The New York Rangers lost their star center Neil Colville for a few games as the result of some horseplay that must have infuriated Lester Patrick. Defenceman Joe Cooper was pursuing a fad of slicing off neckties from teammates using a penknife. Colville threw up his hand only to receive a gash that required 11 stitches to close.

The New York Americans, with Ching Johnson and Hap Day to relieve Joe Jerwa and Al Murray on defence, were doing much better than usual. Earl Robertson, their new goaltender, was leading the Canadian Division in goaltending and ended up doing so at season's end. The Amerks also had Sweeney Schriner and Nels Stewart contributing in a nice way to the offence.

The Montreal Maroons, coached at first by King Clancy, settled into last place and president and general manager Tommy Gorman decided he would take over as coach. He did even worse and the fans stayed away. Although the team did badly, one highlight was an 11–7 win over their rivals, the Canadiens, and Baldy Northcott had a hat trick in the game. There seemed to be nothing Gorman could do to revitalize the team and at one stretch the team lost 8 straight games. On March 17, 1938, the Maroons played their last game against their rivals, the Canadiens.

Detroit was the shockingly bad team of the American Division. After winning the Stanley Cup in 1937, they were reclining in the cellar of the Division. They had one bright moment when Carl Liscombe set a record for the fastest hat trick to this time (since broken by Bill Mosienko). Liscombe scored three goals in 1 minute and 52 seconds in a 5–1 win over Chicago.

On March 17, 1938, Nels Stewart scored his 300th National Hockey League goal in a 5–3 loss to the Rangers.

=== Final standings ===
Canadian Division
	GP	W	L	T	Pts	GF	GA	PIM
**Toronto Maple Leafs**	48	24	15	9	57	151	127	404
**New York Americans**	48	19	18	11	49	110	111	327
**Montreal Canadiens**	48	18	17	13	49	123	128	340
Montreal Maroons	48	12	30	6	30	101	149	470

American Division
	GP	W	L	T	Pts	GF	GA	PIM
**Boston Bruins**	48	30	11	7	67	142	89	284
**New York Rangers**	48	27	15	6	60	149	96	435
**Chicago Black Hawks**	48	14	25	9	37	97	139	238
Detroit Red Wings	48	12	25	11	35	99	133	258

Note: GP = Games played, W = Wins, L = Losses, T = Ties, Pts = Points, GF = Goals for, GA = Goals against, PIM = Penalties in minutes
Teams that qualified for the playoffs are highlighted in bold.

== Playoffs ==
The Chicago Black Hawks who having barely made the playoffs, proceeded to defeat the Canadiens, the Americans, and the Maple Leafs, to win the cup with the lowest regular-season winning percentage of any champions in the big-four major professional sports leagues of North America.

=== Playoff bracket ===
The top three teams in each division qualified for the playoffs. The two division winners met in a best-of-five Stanley Cup semifinal series. The divisional second-place teams and third-place teams played off in a best-of-three series to determine the participants for the other best-of-three semifinal series. The semifinal winners then played in a best-of-five Stanley Cup Finals (scores in the bracket indicate the number of games won in each series).

First round
C2	NY Americans	2
A2	NY Rangers	1
C3	Mtl Canadiens	1
A3	Chicago	2

Semifinals
C1	Toronto	3
A1	Boston	0
C2	NY Americans	1
A3	Chicago	2

Final
C1	Toronto	1
A3	Chicago	3

=== Quarterfinals ===
==== (A2) New York Rangers vs. (C2) New York Americans ====
The New York Americans stunned the New York Rangers as Lorne Carr scored the winner in overtime in the third and deciding game.

March 22	New York Americans	2–1	2OT	New York Rangers	Madison Square Garden III	Recap
No scoring		First period		01:30 – Cecil Dillon (1)
Red Beattie (1) – 09:26		Second period		No scoring
No scoring		Third period		No scoring
John Sorrell (1) – 01:25		Second overtime period		No scoring
Earl Robertson		Goalie stats		Dave Kerr

March 24	New York Rangers	4–3	New York Americans	Madison Square Garden III	Recap
Bryan Hextall (1) – 11:28		First period	No scoring
Clint Smith (1) – 04:05; Alex Shibicky (1) – 08:37		Second period	12:23 – pp – Tommy Anderson (1)
Clint Smith (2) – 15:00		Third period	07:13 – John Sorrell (2); 17:58 – John Sorrell (3)
Dave Kerr		Goalie stats	Earl Robertson

March 27	New York Americans	3–2	4OT	New York Rangers	Madison Square Garden III	Recap
No scoring		First period		No scoring
No scoring		Second period		06:27 – Alex Shibicky (2); 07:31 – Bryan Hextall (2)
Lorne Carr (1) – 04:36; Nels Stewart (1) – 10:38		Third period		No scoring
Lorne Carr (2) – 00:40		Fourth overtime period		No scoring
Earl Robertson		Goalie stats		Dave Kerr

New York Americans won series 2–1

==== (A3) Montreal Canadiens vs. (C3) Chicago Black Hawks ====
The Canadiens beat the Hawks in game one of the quarterfinal, as Toe Blake had the hat trick. But Mike Karakas shut out the Canadiens in the second game and even though Georges Mantha appeared to win the game with a freak goal in game three, Earl Seibert kept the Hawks from losing with a goal late in the game, and then the Hawks won the series in overtime.

March 22	Chicago Black Hawks	4–6	Montreal Canadiens	Montreal Forum	Recap
Paul Thompson (1) – 01:31		First period	10:58 – Babe Siebert (1)
Mush March (1) – 12:23		Second period	13:38 – pp – Toe Blake (1); 18:45 – Red Goupille (1)
Johnny Gottselig (1) – 09:30; Cully Dahlstrom (1) – 11:51		Third period	11:32 – Toe Blake (2); 17:32 – Toe Blake (3); 18:40 – Red Goupille (2)
Mike Karakas		Goalie stats	Wilf Cude

March 24	Montreal Canadiens	0–4	Chicago Black Hawks	Chicago Stadium	Recap
No scoring		First period	17:58 – Earl Seibert (1)
No scoring		Second period	No scoring
No scoring		Third period	10:06 – Earl Seibert (2); 13:34 – Johnny Gottselig (2); 19:59 – Paul Thompson (2)
Wilf Cude		Goalie stats	Mike Karakas

March 26	Chicago Black Hawks	3–2	OT	Montreal Canadiens	Montreal Forum	Recap
Johnny Gottselig (3) – 18:24		First period		No scoring
No scoring		Second period		08:52 – Johnny Gagnon (1)
Earl Seibert (3) – 18:34		Third period		12:46 – pp – Georges Mantha (1)
Paul Thompson (3) – 11:49		First overtime period		No scoring
Mike Karakas		Goalie stats		Wilf Cude

Chicago won series 2–1

=== Semifinals ===
==== (A1) Boston Bruins vs. (C1) Toronto Maple Leafs ====
In an upset, the Toronto Maple Leafs beat Boston in the Series A semifinal.

March 24	Boston Bruins	0–1	2OT	Toronto Maple Leafs	Maple Leaf Gardens	Recap
No scoring		First period		No scoring
No scoring		Second period		No scoring
No scoring		Third period		No scoring
No scoring		Second overtime period		01:31 – George Parsons (1)
Tiny Thompson		Goalie stats		Turk Broda

March 26	Boston Bruins	1–2	Toronto Maple Leafs	Maple Leaf Gardens	Recap
No scoring		First period	No scoring
No scoring		Second period	14:30 – Pep Kelly (1)
Charlie Sands (1) – 07:37		Third period	08:57 – Gordie Drillon (1)
Turk Broda		Goalie stats	Tiny Thompson

March 29	Toronto Maple Leafs	3–2	OT	Boston Bruins	Boston Garden	Recap
No scoring		First period		No scoring
Gordie Drillon (2) – 01:16		Second period		No scoring
Pep Kelly (2) – 05:02		Third period		03:24 – Bill Cowley (1); 16:49 – Bill Cowley (2)
Gordie Drillon (3) – 10:04		First overtime period		No scoring
Tiny Thompson		Goalie stats		Turk Broda

Toronto won series 3–0

==== (C2) New York Americans vs. (A3) Chicago Black Hawks ====
In the Series B semifinal, it was Chicago and the New York Americans, who beat Chicago in game one 3–1. Game two was a great goaltenders battle between Mike Karakas and Earl Robertson. It appeared that the Americans were headed to their first Stanley Cup Finals when Nels Stewart scored with seconds left in the game, but referee Clarence Campbell disallowed the goal, saying Eddie Wiseman was in the goal crease. Cully Dahlstrom scored the goal that saved the Black Hawks. In New York, the deciding game saw Alex Levinsky of Chicago score the go-ahead goal, but the red light did not go on. Investigation revealed that fans were holding the goal judge's hand so he could not signal the goal. Although the Amerks came close, they were unable to tie the score and the Black Hawks were in the finals.

March 29	Chicago Black Hawks	1–3	New York Americans	Madison Square Garden III	Recap
Carl Voss (1) – 05:19		First period	No scoring
No scoring		Second period	16:47 – Nels Stewart (2)
No scoring		Third period	15:52 – John Sorrell (4); 19:08 – pp – Sweeney Schriner (1)
Mike Karakas		Goalie stats	Earl Robertson

March 31	New York Americans	0–1	2OT	Chicago Black Hawks	Chicago Stadium	Recap
No scoring		First period		No scoring
No scoring		Second period		No scoring
No scoring		Third period		No scoring
No scoring		Second overtime period		13:01 – Cully Dahlstrom (2)
Earl Robertson		Goalie stats		Mike Karakas

April 3	Chicago Black Hawks	3–2	New York Americans	Madison Square Garden III	Recap
No scoring		First period	19:40 – pp – Lorne Carr (3)
Earl Seibert (4) – 14:52; Alex Levinsky (1) – 17:43		Second period	No scoring
Doc Romnes (1) – 15:53		Third period	16:29 – Red Beattie (2)
Mike Karakas		Goalie stats	Earl Robertson

Chicago won series 2–1

=== Stanley Cup Finals ===
April 5	Chicago Black Hawks	3–1	Toronto Maple Leafs	Maple Leaf Gardens	Recap
Johnny Gottselig (4) – pp – 19:08		First period	01:54 – Gordie Drillon (4)
Paul Thompson (4) – 01:51		Second period	No scoring
Johnny Gottselig (5) – 12:08		Third period	No scoring
Alfie Moore		Goalie stats	Turk Broda

April 7	Chicago Black Hawks	1–5	Toronto Maple Leafs	Maple Leaf Gardens	Recap
Earl Seibert (5) – pp – 08:31		First period	01:42 – Gordie Drillon (5)
No scoring		Second period	06:10 – Busher Jackson (1)
No scoring		Third period	09:44 – Gordie Drillon (6); 11:29 – George Parsons (2); 12:08 – George Parsons (3)
Alfie Moore		Goalie stats	Turk Broda

April 10	Toronto Maple Leafs	1–2	Chicago Black Hawks	Chicago Stadium	Recap
Syl Apps (1) – pp – 01:35		First period	No scoring
No scoring		Second period	16:02 – Carl Voss (2)
No scoring		Third period	15:55 – Doc Romnes (2)
Turk Broda		Goalie stats	Alfie Moore

April 12	Toronto Maple Leafs	1–4	Chicago Black Hawks	Chicago Stadium	Recap
Gordie Drillon (7) – 08:26		First period	05:52 – Cully Dahlstrom (3)
No scoring		Second period	16:45 – Carl Voss (3); 17:58 – Jack Shill (1)
No scoring		Third period	16:24 – Mush March (2)
Turk Broda		Goalie stats	Alfie Moore

Chicago won series 3–1

== European tour ==
After the Stanley Cup Finals finished, the Detroit Red Wings and the Montreal Canadiens played a nine-game exhibition series in Europe, becoming the first NHL teams to play outside North America. Six games were played in the United Kingdom, three in France. The Canadiens won the series with a record of 5–3–1.

== Awards ==
Trophy winners
Calder Trophy: (Best first-year player)	Cully Dahlstrom, Chicago Black Hawks
Hart Trophy: (Most valuable player)	Eddie Shore, Boston Bruins
Lady Byng Trophy: (Excellence and sportsmanship)	Gordie Drillon, Toronto Maple Leafs
O'Brien Cup: (Canadian Division champion)	Toronto Maple Leafs
Prince of Wales Trophy: (American Division champion)	Boston Bruins
Vezina Trophy: (Fewest goals allowed)	Tiny Thompson, Boston Bruins

All-Star teams
First Team	Position	Second Team
Tiny Thompson, Boston Bruins	G	Dave Kerr, New York Rangers
Eddie Shore, Boston Bruins	D	Art Coulter, New York Rangers
Babe Siebert, Montreal Canadiens	D	Earl Seibert, Chicago Black Hawks
Bill Cowley, Boston Bruins	C	Syl Apps, Toronto Maple Leafs
Cecil Dillon, New York Rangers Gordie Drillon, Toronto Maple Leafs (tie)	RW	
Paul Thompson, Chicago Black Hawks	LW	Toe Blake, Montreal Canadiens
Lester Patrick, New York Rangers	Coach	Art Ross, Boston Bruins

== Player statistics ==
=== Scoring leaders ===
Note: GP = Games played, G = Goals, A = Assists, PTS = Points, PIM = Penalties in minutes

PLAYER	TEAM	GP	G	A	PTS	PIM
Gordie Drillon	Toronto Maple Leafs	48	26	26	52	4
Syl Apps	Toronto Maple Leafs	47	21	29	50	9
Paul Thompson	Chicago Black Hawks	48	22	22	44	14
Georges Mantha	Montreal Canadiens	47	23	19	42	12
Cecil Dillon	New York Rangers	48	21	18	39	6
Bill Cowley	Boston Bruins	48	17	22	39	8
Sweeney Schriner	New York Americans	48	21	17	38	22
Bill Thoms	Toronto Maple Leafs	48	14	24	38	14
Clint Smith	New York Rangers	48	14	23	37	0
Nels Stewart	New York Americans	48	19	17	36	29

Source: NHL

=== Leading goaltenders ===
- Tiny Thompson 1:80 Gaa Bos
- Dave Kerr New York R 1:95 Gaa
- Earl Robertson New York Americans 2:22
- Wilf Cude Montreal Canadiens 2:53
- Turk Broda Toronto Maple Leafs 2:56
- Normie Smith Detroit 2:66
- Mike Karakas Chicago 2:80
- Bill Beveridge Montreal Maroons 3:00

== Coaches ==
=== American Division ===
- Boston Bruins: Art Ross
- Chicago Black Hawks: Bill Stewart
- Detroit Red Wings: Jack Adams
- New York Rangers: Lester Patrick

=== Canadian Division ===
- Montreal Canadiens: Cecil Hart
- Montreal Maroons: King Clancy and Tommy Gorman
- New York Americans: Red Dutton
- Toronto Maple Leafs: Dick Irvin

== Debuts ==
The following is a list of players of note who played their first NHL game in 1937–38 (listed with their first team, asterisk(*) marks debut in playoffs):

- Red Hamill, Boston Bruins
- Mel Hill, Boston Bruins
- Jack Crawford, Boston Bruins
- Cully Dahlstrom, Chicago Black Hawks
- Carl Liscombe, Detroit Red Wings
- Dutch Hiller, New York Rangers
- Murph Chamberlain, Toronto Maple Leafs

== Last games ==
The following is a list of players of note that played their last game in the NHL in 1937–38 (listed with their last team):

- Carl Voss, Chicago Black Hawks
- Joe Lamb, Detroit Red Wings
- Pit Lepine, Montreal Canadiens
- Aurel Joliat, Montreal Canadiens
- Marty Burke, Montreal Canadiens
- Tom Cook, Montreal Maroons
- Al Shields, Montreal Maroons
- Hap Day, New York Americans
- Hap Emms, New York Americans
- Ching Johnson, New York Americans
- Butch Keeling, New York Rangers

== See also ==
- 1937–38 NHL transactions
- List of Stanley Cup champions
- National Hockey League All-Star Game
- 1937 in sports
- 1938 in sports
