= Earl Seibert =

Canadian ice hockey player (1910–1990)

- Hockey Hall of Fame, 1963
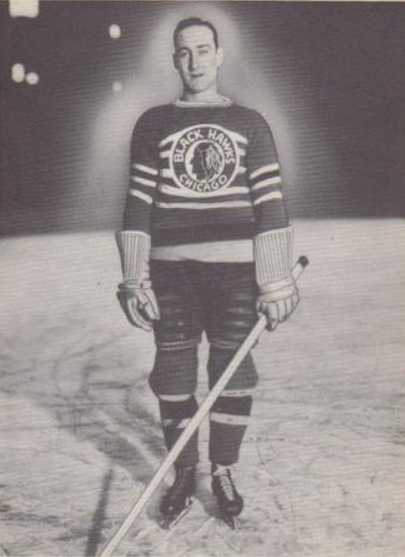
- Seibert with the Chicago Black Hawks, c. 1939
- Born: December 7, 1910 Berlin, Ontario, Canada
- Died: May 12, 1990 (aged 79) Agawam, Massachusetts, U.S.
- Height: 6 ft 2 in (188 cm)
- Weight: 200 lb (91 kg; 14 st 4 lb)
- Position: Defence
- Shot: Right
- Played for: New York Rangers; Chicago Black Hawks; Detroit Red Wings
- Playing career: 1931–1947

Walter Earl Seibert (December 7, 1910 – May 12, 1990) was a Canadian ice hockey defenceman who played for 15 seasons for the Chicago Black Hawks, New York Rangers and Detroit Red Wings between 1931 and 1946. He was inducted into the Hockey Hall of Fame in 1963.

== Playing career ==
Earl was an important member of the 1933 New York Rangers and 1938 Chicago Black Hawks Stanley Cup victories. Each year from 1935 to 1944, Seibert was selected to the first or second NHL All-Star team (four times to the first, six times to the second). A tenacious defender, Seibert was renowned for rugged physical play, famously being the only player Eddie Shore was unwilling to fight.

An accident during a January 28, 1937 game cast a shadow over Seibert's great career. Seibert and the legendary Howie Morenz became tangled up behind the Chicago net. Morenz fell awkwardly against the boards and broke his leg in several places. Morenz died in the hospital from complications of the injury several weeks later.

After his NHL retirement, Seibert served as coach of Eddie Shore's Springfield Indians.

Seibert was inducted into the Hockey Hall of Fame in 1963 and joined his father Oliver as the first father and son combination in the Hall of Fame. In 1998, he was ranked number 72 on The Hockey News' list of the 100 Greatest Hockey Players.

Seibert died following a battle with brain cancer on May 12, 1990.

In the 2009 book 100 Ranger Greats, the authors ranked Seibert at No. 61 all-time of the 901 New York Rangers who had played during the team's first 82 seasons.

== Career statistics ==
=== Regular season and playoffs ===
			Regular season					Playoffs
Season	Team	League	GP	G	A	Pts	PIM	GP	G	A	Pts	PIM
1927–28	Kitchener Greenshirts	OHA	—	—	—	—	—	—	—	—	—	—
1927–28	Kitchener Greenshirts	OHA Sr	1	0	0	0	2	—	—	—	—	—
1928–29	Kitchener Greenshirts	OHA	—	—	—	—	—	—	—	—	—	—
1929–30	Springfield Indians	CAHL	40	4	1	5	84	—	—	—	—	—
1930–31	Springfield Indians	CAHL	38	16	11	27	96	—	—	—	—	—
1931–32	New York Rangers	NHL	44	4	6	10	88	7	1	2	3	14
1932–33	New York Rangers	NHL	45	2	3	5	92	8	1	0	1	14
1933–34	New York Rangers	NHL	48	13	10	23	66	2	0	0	0	4
1934–35	New York Rangers	NHL	48	6	19	25	86	4	0	0	0	6
1935–36	New York Rangers	NHL	15	3	3	6	6	—	—	—	—	—
1935–36	Chicago Black Hawks	NHL	29	2	6	8	21	2	2	0	2	0
1936–37	Chicago Black Hawks	NHL	45	9	6	15	46	—	—	—	—	—
1937–38	Chicago Black Hawks	NHL	48	8	13	21	38	10	5	2	7	12
1938–39	Chicago Black Hawks	NHL	48	4	11	15	57	—	—	—	—	—
1939–40	Chicago Black Hawks	NHL	37	3	7	10	35	2	0	1	1	8
1940–41	Chicago Black Hawks	NHL	44	3	17	20	52	5	0	0	0	12
1941–42	Chicago Black Hawks	NHL	45	7	14	21	52	2	0	0	0	0
1942–43	Chicago Black Hawks	NHL	44	5	27	32	48	—	—	—	—	—
1943–44	Chicago Black Hawks	NHL	50	8	25	33	40	9	0	2	2	2
1944–45	Chicago Black Hawks	NHL	22	7	8	15	13	—	—	—	—	—
1944–45	Detroit Red Wings	NHL	25	5	9	14	10	14	2	1	3	4
1945–46	Indianapolis Capitals	AHL	24	2	9	11	19	—	—	—	—	—
1945–46	Detroit Red Wings	NHL	18	0	3	3	18	—	—	—	—	—
1946–47	Indianapolis Capitals	AHL	19	0	0	0	0	—	—	—	—	—
NHL totals			653	89	187	276	768	65	11	8	19	76

== Coaching statistics ==
‡ – midseason replacement

Earl Seibert AHL coaching statistics
Team	Year	Regular season						Postseason				
Team	Year	G	W	L	T	OTL	Pts	G	W	L	Win%	Result
IDC	1945–46‡	30	15	7	8	0	(38)	5	1	4	.633	Lost in league semi-final
SPI	1946–47	64	24	29	11	0	59	2	0	2	.461	Lost in preliminary round
SPI	1947–48	68	19	42	7	0	45	–	–	–	.331	Out of playoffs
SPI	1948–49	68	22	37	9	0	53	3	1	2	.737	Lost in preliminary round
SPI	1949–50	70	28	34	8	0	64	2	0	2	.457	Lost in first round
SPI	1950–51	70	27	37	6	0	60	3	0	3	.429	Lost in first round
Total		370	135	186	49	0	319	15	2	13	.431	5 playoff appearances

== See also ==
- Captain (ice hockey)

Preceded by Johnny Gottselig	Chicago Black Hawks captain 1940–42	Succeeded by Doug Bentley
