= 1938 Detroit Red Wings–Montreal Canadiens European tour =

Sports exhibition

1938 Detroit Red Wings–Montreal Canadiens European Tour
	1	2	3	4	5	6	7	8	9	Total
Detroit Red Wings	4	5	8	4	5	3	10	4	5	3
Montreal Canadiens	5*	5	10	3	7	6	5	5	2	5
- Location(s): Earls Court (1, 6, 8); Brighton (2, 7, 9); Paris (3, 4, 5)
- Dates: April 21 – May 13, 1938

The 1938 Detroit Red Wings–Montreal Canadiens European tour was a nine-game exhibition series played by the Detroit Red Wings and the Montreal Canadiens of the National Hockey League (NHL) in England and France in April and May 1938, after the conclusion of the 1937–38 NHL season. It was the first time in the history of the NHL that its teams played games in Europe. The game played on 21 April 1938 was the first one organized by any major professional sports leagues in the United States and Canada, to take place outside North America. The Canadiens won the series with a record of 5–3–1.

== Background ==
=== Unsuccessful attempts ===
The idea of NHL teams playing exhibition games in Europe goes back to 1924. Frank Patrick, the head coach of the Vancouver Maroons (PCHA), wanted the Montreal Canadiens to join his team in London for exhibition games during the British Empire Exhibition which was to take place in April–October 1924. Those plans did not materialize. Later, in 1932, when Lester Patrick, Frank's brother and head coach of the New York Rangers, had a deal to have his team play exhibition games in London and other European cities, he too asked the Canadiens to join him on the tour. This also failed to come to fruition. The main cause both times was lack of proper hockey rinks. Yet another plan arose three years later, when Leo Dandurand, the general manager of the Canadiens, announced on February 8, 1935, that his team is "virtually certain" to undertake an eight-game tour of London, Paris, Berlin, and Milan, playing two games in each city. The Boston Bruins or the New York Rangers were suggested as possibly joining the Canadiens. Negotiations seemed to go smoothly, and on March 5 it was announced that arrangements had been made for the Canadiens and likely the Rangers to undertake a trip to Europe for five games in London, as well as games in Vienna and Budapest, and possibly other cities. However, Armand Vincent, Montreal sports promoter who had championed a European tour by NHL teams, announced on March 25 that he was unable to finalize the deal to have the Canadiens and the Rangers tour Europe. Two days later Vincent announced that arrangements finally were completed for the Canadiens to tour Europe in 1936 for fifteen games: in London for three games, in Berlin, Munich, Garmisch, Prague, and Vienna for two games, and a game in Budapest and Zürich. Once again, that plan never got off the ground.

=== Final negotiations ===
After the Detroit Red Wings won the 1937 Stanley Cup, their second in a row, they failed to make the 1938 playoffs, placing last in the American Division and second-to-last overall. Meanwhile, the Montreal Canadiens made the 1938 playoffs, but lost to the Chicago Black Hawks in the first round. After the Canadiens were eliminated from the playoffs on March 26, Cecil Hart, Montreal's head coach, announced tentative plans for a trip to London and Paris. On March 29, Armand Vincent announced that the arrangements had been made for a European tour for Detroit and Montreal. This took Hart by surprise. He said: "That's funny. They announce over there that the trip is all set, and we don't know anything about it over here." On March 31, Hart received agreement of the British Ice Hockey Association to have the European tour, and the agreement of the French Ice Hockey Federation followed shortly. Both organizations deposited $2,500 in order to stage the games. The tour was officially announced by Hart on April 1, yet as late as two days prior to departure, Hart stated that the $2,500 sum had not yet been deposited, nor a contract had been signed by the British. In addition to games in England and France, preliminary plans also called for games in Belgium, Germany, and Scotland, but that did not come into fruition. Nor did the initial plan for the NHL teams to play local amateur teams.

== Pre-tour games ==
On April 5, Detroit traveled to Montreal, and then both teams traveled to Sydney, Nova Scotia. Prior to departing on the RMS Ausonia for Europe on April 9 from Halifax, Nova Scotia, the teams played three exhibition games: in Sydney on April 7, and in Halifax on April 8 and 9. Montreal's Paul Haynes scored all three goals in the 3–2 win in Sydney. The next day, at the Halifax Forum, Montreal again beat Detroit, winning in overtime 6–5 in front of 5,000 spectators, with Toe Blake scoring the overtime winner for the Canadiens. The following day, the Red Wings came back, winning 7–2. The teams were also asked to play a game in Moncton, but scheduling did not allow for it.

Date	City	Arena	Winning team	Losing team	Score
April 7	Sydney		Montreal Canadiens	Detroit Red Wings	3–2
April 8	Halifax	Halifax Forum	Montreal Canadiens	Detroit Red Wings	6–5 OT
April 9	Halifax	Halifax Forum	Detroit Red Wings	Montreal Canadiens	7–2

== The tour ==
=== England (April 21–23) ===
The two teams arrived in London, England, on April 19 and were met with high interest and heavy ticket sales. The first game of the tour took place at Empress Hall, Earls Court, a suburb of London on April 21 in front of 8,000 spectators. Jack Adams, Detroit's head coach, addressed the crowd at various points during the game, explaining the differences between NHL rules and those of the English amateur league. Montreal's goaltender Wilf Cude, a native of Wales, was presented with a wreath of leeks and received an ovation. The teams were tied after regulation, and Montreal forward Toe Blake scored in overtime to win the game 5–4. Next, the teams traveled to Brighton, and played their second game of the tour on April 23. The game featured two fights: the first between Marty Barry and Red Goupille; the second between Toe Blake and Peter Bessone. Montreal's Johnny Gagnon scored three goals, and Detroit rallied twice from behind putting continuous pressure on the Canadiens in the third to force overtime, which went scoreless and the game ended in a 5–5 tie.

=== France (April 25–29) ===
After two games in England, the teams traveled to France for three games in Paris. The first game, on April 25, the first professional hockey game in France, was a fast and exciting 10–8 affair with Detroit's Hec Kilrea and Montreal's Johnny Gagnon each scoring three goals. The second game in Paris took place on April 27 in front of a raving crowd, and the Red Wings won 4–3, coming back with three goals in the third period, after being down 3–1. The third and final game in Paris was played on April 29, and Montreal defeated Detroit 7–5.

=== England (May 5–14) ===
The games resumed back in Earls Court on May 5, with the Canadiens winning 6–3 in front of 8,500 fans. It was a rough game featuring two fights, and Hec Kilrea also received a major penalty for arguing with a referee. Paul Haynes scored twice in the third period to secure the win for Montreal. Next, the teams once again traveled to Brighton where Detroit won its second game of the tour on May 7 by a score of 10–5, the largest margin of victory of the entire tour. Detroit's Doug Young, Carl Liscombe, and Mud Bruneteau each scored twice in front of a crowd of 8,500. Moving back to Earls Court, Montreal won the next game on May 10 by a score of 5–4. Montreal's Toe Blake scored three goals, including the game-winner. Trailing at the end of the third period, Detroit head coach Jack Adams pulled his goaltender Normie Smith for an extra attacker, but the Red Wings failed to get the tying goal. For the final game of the tour, the two teams once again traveled to Brighton and played the concluding game on May 14. Detroit won their third game in the series by a score of 5–2. Mud Bruneteau and Marty Barry of the Red Wings each tallied two goals. After the game, Montreal's head coach Cecil Hart said: "We've had a successful and enjoyable trip. The boys played wonderful hockey and I'm sure they've sold the professional game in a big way to British and French fans". The teams traveled to Southampton where they embarked on their journey back to North America.

=== Post-tour ===
The Montreal Canadiens and the Detroit Red Wings returned home on May 23 on the RMS Aurania. The overall reception of the tour was very enthusiastic despite poor publicity, although reportedly the English fans were disappointed that the games did not feature as much body-checking as they were hoping for. The head coaches of both teams agreed the tour was wonderful and a success, and the players proclaimed it was the greatest experience of their lives. Each player earned $250 for the tour. Speaking about the European tour, Cecil Hart said: "It was wonderful; simply marvelous, I can't get over it. Yes, I believe pro hockey is still five years off over there; they haven't got the rinks yet. But think of the opportunities with no traveling expenses and such thickly-populated areas. We packed them in everywhere. The last game we played over there, we turned away between 3,000 and 4,000 fans. And that with very little publicity." During the tour there was an offer to play a three-game series in Switzerland, but the offer had to be turned down as it came just a day prior to departure, and there was discussion of another such exhibition tour. Nothing came of those plans at the time.

=== Overview table ===
Date	City	Arena	Team	Team	Score
April 21	Earls Court, England	Empress Hall	Detroit Red Wings	Montreal Canadiens	5–4 OT
April 23	Brighton, England	Sports Stadium Brighton	Detroit Red Wings	Montreal Canadiens	5–5
April 25	Paris, France	Palais des Sports	Detroit Red Wings	Montreal Canadiens	10–8
April 27	Paris, France	Palais des Sports	Detroit Red Wings	Montreal Canadiens	4–3
April 29	Paris, France	Palais des Sports	Detroit Red Wings	Montreal Canadiens	7–5
May 5	Earls Court, England	Empress Hall	Detroit Red Wings	Montreal Canadiens	6–3
May 8	Brighton, England	Sports Stadium Brighton	Detroit Red Wings	Montreal Canadiens	10–5
May 10	Earls Court, England	Empress Hall	Detroit Red Wings	Montreal Canadiens	5–4
May 14	Brighton, England	Sports Stadium Brighton	Detroit Red Wings	Montreal Canadiens	5–2

== Attempted second tour in 1953 ==
Fifteen years later, in early March 1953, the Montreal Canadiens announced plans for a tour of Europe, visiting England, France, Germany, Italy, Switzerland, Scotland, and possibly other countries. Originally Montreal was to again play the Detroit Red Wings, but Detroit could not complete all necessary arrangements, so the Chicago Black Hawks were supposed to go instead. However, on March 25 Montreal's general manager Frank Selke said that Chicago players did not want to make the trip and so the tour was in jeopardy. On March 30 it was officially announced that the tour was cancelled. According to Bill Tobin, Chicago's president, the scheduling did not work out, and the teams were only left with the proposition of playing ten games in England. Selke said: "I'm not going to ask another team for the series. I asked the Hawks because I like them and the way they play. I guess it's all off".

== See also ==
- List of international games played by NHL teams
