= 1937–38 New York Americans season =

National Hockey League team season

1937–38 New York Americans
- Division: 2nd Canadian
- 1937–38 record: 19–18–11
- Home record: 9–9–6
- Road record: 10–9–5
- Goals for: 110
- Goals against: 111

Team information
- Coach: Red Dutton
- Captain: Sweeney Schriner
- Arena: Madison Square Garden

Team leaders
- Goals: Sweeney Schriner (21)
- Assists: Art Chapman (27)
- Points: Sweeney Schriner (38)
- Penalty minutes: Joe Jerwa (53)
- Wins: Earl Robertson (19)
- Goals against average: Earl Robertson (2.22)

The 1937–38 New York Americans season was the Americans' 13th season of play.

== Offseason ==
The team played an exhibition game against the New York Rangers in Saskatoon, Saskatchewan 30 October to open the new Saskatoon Arena.

== Regular season ==
=== Final standings ===
Canadian Division
	GP	W	L	T	GF	GA	PTS
**Toronto Maple Leafs**	48	24	15	9	151	127	57
**New York Americans**	48	19	18	11	110	111	49
**Montreal Canadiens**	48	18	17	13	123	128	49
Montreal Maroons	48	12	30	6	101	149	30

Note: W = Wins, L = Losses, T = Ties, GF = Goals For, GA = Goals Against, Pts = Points
Teams that qualified for the playoffs are highlighted in bold.

=== Record vs. opponents ===
==== Vs. Canadian Division ====
1937–38 NHL records
Team	**MTL**	**MTM**	**NYA**	**TOR**	**Total**
M. Canadiens	—	4–4	3–2–3	1–4–3	**8–10–6**
M. Maroons	4–4	—	1–7	2–6	**7–17–0**
N.Y. Americans	2–3–3	7–1	—	2–5–1	**11–9–4**
Toronto	4–1–3	6–2	5–2–1	—	**15–5–4**

==== Vs. American Division ====
1937–38 NHL records
Team	**BOS**	**CHI**	**DET**	**NYR**	**Total**
M. Canadiens	2–2–2	3–1–2	2–3–1	3–1–2	**10–7–7**
M. Maroons	0–4–2	2–4	3–0–3	0–5–1	**5–13–6**
N.Y. Americans	1–3–2	4–0–2	2–2–2	1–4–1	**8–9–7**
Toronto	1–5	2–1–3	4–0–2	2–4	**9–10–5**

== Schedule and results ==
1937–38 regular season
November

Game	Result	Date	Score	Opponent	Record
1	W	November 4, 1937	3–0	@ Chicago Black Hawks (1937–38)	1–0–0
2	L	November 6, 1937	3–6	@ Toronto Maple Leafs (1937–38)	1–1–0
3	W	November 14, 1937	2–0	Montreal Maroons (1937–38)	2–1–0
4	L	November 16, 1937	0–1	@ New York Rangers (1937–38)	2–2–0
5	L	November 18, 1937	1–2	Boston Bruins (1937–38)	2–3–0
6	W	November 23, 1937	3–1	Detroit Red Wings (1937–38)	3–3–0
7	W	November 27, 1937	4–0	Chicago Black Hawks (1937–38)	4–3–0
8	T	November 28, 1937	3–3 OT	@ Boston Bruins (1937–38)	4–3–1

December

Game	Result	Date	Score	Opponent	Record
9	W	December 4, 1937	3–1	@ Montreal Maroons (1937–38)	5–3–1
10	W	December 5, 1937	2–1	@ Detroit Red Wings (1937–38)	6–3–1
11	L	December 11, 1937	3–4 OT	@ Montreal Canadiens (1937–38)	6–4–1
12	T	December 12, 1937	4–4 OT	Montreal Canadiens (1937–38)	6–4–2
13	L	December 16, 1937	0–2	New York Rangers (1937–38)	6–5–2
14	L	December 18, 1937	2–3	@ Toronto Maple Leafs (1937–38)	6–6–2
15	W	December 19, 1937	1–0	@ Chicago Black Hawks (1937–38)	7–6–2
16	L	December 25, 1937	0–1	Boston Bruins (1937–38)	7–7–2
17	W	December 26, 1937	3–1	@ Boston Bruins (1937–38)	8–7–2
18	L	December 28, 1937	0–3	Toronto Maple Leafs (1937–38)	8–8–2

January

Game	Result	Date	Score	Opponent	Record
19	W	January 1, 1938	3–1	@ Montreal Maroons (1937–38)	9–8–2
20	W	January 2, 1938	2–1	Montreal Maroons (1937–38)	10–8–2
21	T	January 4, 1938	5–5 OT	@ New York Rangers (1937–38)	10–8–3
22	T	January 6, 1938	1–1 OT	Detroit Red Wings (1937–38)	10–8–4
23	T	January 11, 1938	1–1 OT	Chicago Black Hawks (1937–38)	10–8–5
24	L	January 16, 1938	0–4	New York Rangers (1937–38)	10–9–5
25	T	January 20, 1938	1–1 OT	Toronto Maple Leafs (1937–38)	10–9–6
26	L	January 22, 1938	0–4	@ Montreal Canadiens (1937–38)	10–10–6
27	L	January 23, 1938	2–3	@ Detroit Red Wings (1937–38)	10–11–6
28	L	January 30, 1938	2–4	Montreal Canadiens (1937–38)	10–12–6

February

Game	Result	Date	Score	Opponent	Record
29	L	February 3, 1938	1–6	Detroit Red Wings (1937–38)	10–13–6
30	T	February 5, 1938	3–3 OT	@ Montreal Canadiens (1937–38)	10–13–7
31	W	February 8, 1938	3–1	Montreal Maroons (1937–38)	11–13–7
32	T	February 13, 1938	2–2 OT	@ Detroit Red Wings (1937–38)	11–13–8
33	W	February 15, 1938	4–0	Montreal Canadiens (1937–38)	12–13–8
34	T	February 17, 1938	3–3 OT	@ Chicago Black Hawks (1937–38)	12–13–9
35	W	February 19, 1938	4–0	@ Toronto Maple Leafs (1937–38)	13–13–9
36	L	February 20, 1938	2–3	Toronto Maple Leafs (1937–38)	13–14–9
37	W	February 26, 1938	5–1	@ Montreal Maroons (1937–38)	14–14–9
38	L	February 27, 1938	2–4	Montreal Maroons (1937–38)	14–15–9

March

Game	Result	Date	Score	Opponent	Record
39	W	March 1, 1938	4–2	Montreal Canadiens (1937–38)	15–15–9
40	T	March 3, 1938	1–1 OT	@ Montreal Canadiens (1937–38)	15–15–10
41	W	March 6, 1938	3–1	New York Rangers (1937–38)	16–15–10
42	L	March 8, 1938	0–7	@ Boston Bruins (1937–38)	16–16–10
43	T	March 10, 1938	2–2 OT	Boston Bruins (1937–38)	16–16–11
44	W	March 12, 1938	3–1	@ Montreal Maroons (1937–38)	17–16–11
45	W	March 15, 1938	2–1	Chicago Black Hawks (1937–38)	18–16–11
46	L	March 17, 1938	3–5	@ New York Rangers (1937–38)	18–17–11
47	L	March 19, 1938	5–8	@ Toronto Maple Leafs (1937–38)	18–18–11
48	W	March 20, 1938	4–2	Toronto Maple Leafs (1937–38)	19–18–11

Legend: Win (2 points) Loss (0 points) Tie (1 point)

== Playoffs ==
They made it into the playoffs. They defeated the Rangers in 3 games in a best of three series, or 2–1. They went against the Black Hawks in a best of three series and got defeated in 3 games, or 1–2.

== Player statistics ==
=== Regular season ===
Scoring

Player	GP	G	A	Pts	PIM
Sweeney Schriner	48	21	17	38	22
Nels Stewart	48	19	17	36	29
Eddie Wiseman	48	18	14	32	32
Art Chapman	45	2	27	29	8
Tommy Anderson	45	4	21	25	22
Lorne Carr	48	16	7	23	12
Hooley Smith	47	10	10	20	23
Joe Jerwa	48	3	14	17	53
John Sorrell	17	8	2	10	9
John Gallagher	46	3	6	9	18
Red Beattie	19	3	4	7	5
Hap Emms	20	1	3	4	6
Jack Shill	22	1	3	4	10
Hap Day	43	0	3	3	14
Joe Lamb	25	1	0	1	20
Lloyd Klein	3	0	1	1	0
Allan Murray	47	0	1	1	34
Ching Johnson	31	0	0	0	10
Charley Mason	2	0	0	0	0
Earl Robertson	48	0	0	0	0

Goaltending

Player	MIN	GP	W	L	T	GA	GAA	SA	SV	SV%	SO
Earl Robertson	3000	48	19	18	11	111	2.22				6
Team:	3000	48	19	18	11	111	2.22				6

=== Playoffs ===
Scoring

Player	GP	G	A	Pts	PIM
Nels Stewart	6	2	3	5	2
Tommy Anderson	6	1	4	5	2
John Sorrell	6	4	0	4	2
Lorne Carr	6	3	1	4	2
Red Beattie	6	2	2	4	2
Eddie Wiseman	6	0	4	4	10
Hooley Smith	6	0	3	3	0
John Gallagher	6	0	2	2	6
Sweeney Schriner	6	1	0	1	0
Art Chapman	6	0	1	1	0
Hap Day	6	0	0	0	0
Joe Jerwa	6	0	0	0	8
Ching Johnson	6	0	0	0	2
Allan Murray	6	0	0	0	6
Earl Robertson	6	0	0	0	0

Goaltending

Player	MIN	GP	W	L	T	GA	GAA	SA	SV	SV%	SO
Earl Robertson	475	6	3	3		12	1.52				0
Team:	475	6	3	3		12	1.52				0

== See also ==
- 1937–38 NHL season
