= 1937–38 Toronto Maple Leafs season =

NHL hockey team season

1937–38 Toronto Maple Leafs
- Division: 1st Canadian
- 1937–38 record: 24–15–9
- Home record: 13–6–5
- Road record: 11–9–4
- Goals for: 151
- Goals against: 127

Team information
- General manager: Conn Smythe
- Coach: Dick Irvin
- Captain: Charlie Conacher
- Arena: Maple Leaf Gardens

Team leaders
- Goals: Gordie Drillon (26)
- Assists: Syl Apps (29)
- Points: Gordie Drillon (52)
- Penalty minutes: Red Horner (82)
- Wins: Turk Broda (24)
- Goals against average: Turk Broda (2.56)

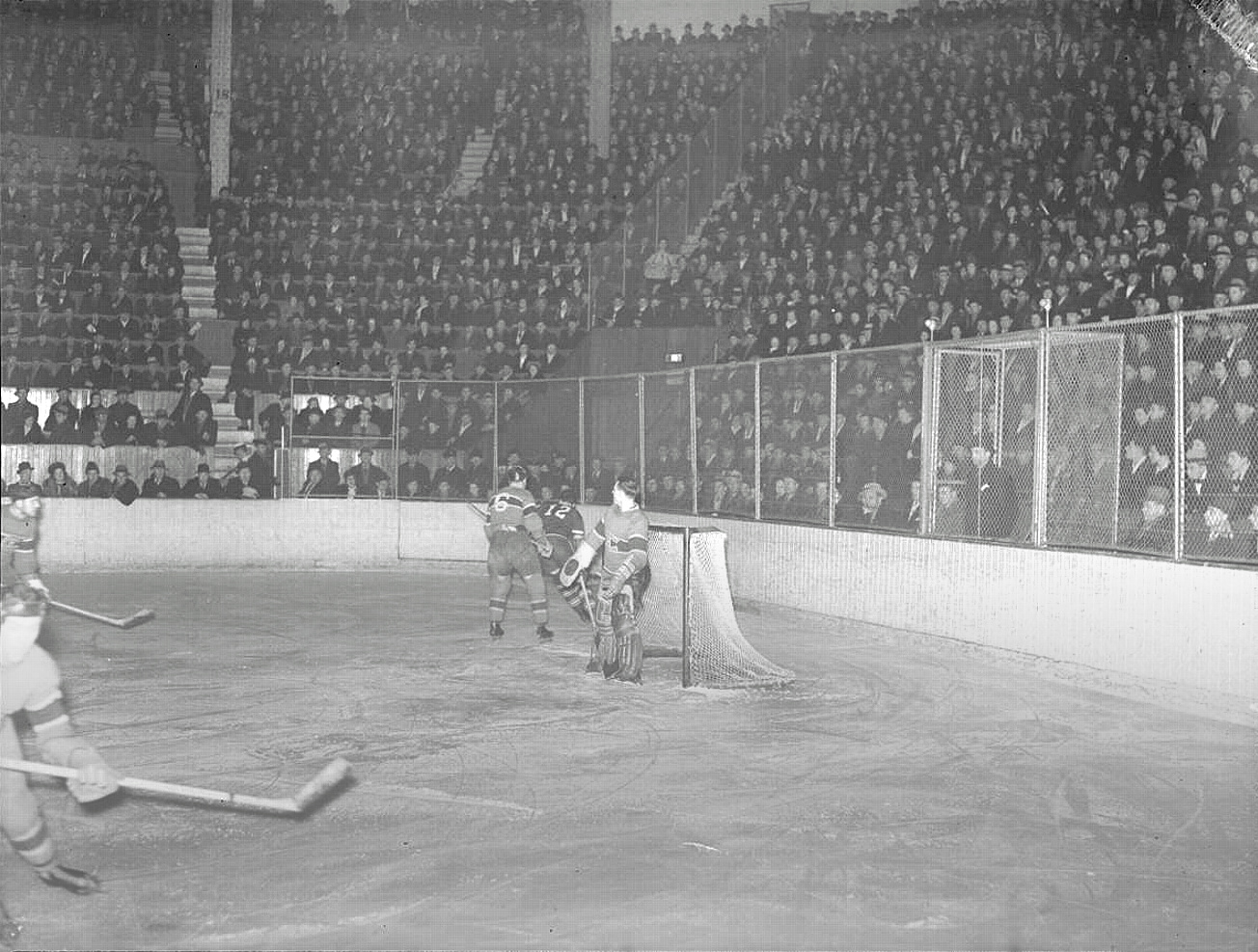
Ice hockey game between the Montreal Canadiens and the Toronto Maple Leafs, March 6, 1938.

The 1937–38 Toronto Maple Leafs season was Toronto's 21st season of operation in the National Hockey League (NHL). The Maple Leafs made another Stanley Cup Finals appearance, losing to the Chicago Black Hawks.

== Regular season ==
=== Final standings ===
Canadian Division
	GP	W	L	T	GF	GA	PTS
**Toronto Maple Leafs**	48	24	15	9	151	127	57
**New York Americans**	48	19	18	11	110	111	49
**Montreal Canadiens**	48	18	17	13	123	128	49
Montreal Maroons	48	12	30	6	101	149	30

Note: W = Wins, L = Losses, T = Ties, GF = Goals For, GA = Goals Against, Pts = Points
Teams that qualified for the playoffs are highlighted in bold.

=== Record vs. opponents ===
==== Vs. Canadian Division ====
1937–38 NHL records
Team	**MTL**	**MTM**	**NYA**	**TOR**	**Total**
M. Canadiens	—	4–4	3–2–3	1–4–3	**8–10–6**
M. Maroons	4–4	—	1–7	2–6	**7–17–0**
N.Y. Americans	2–3–3	7–1	—	2–5–1	**11–9–4**
Toronto	4–1–3	6–2	5–2–1	—	**15–5–4**

==== Vs. American Division ====
1937–38 NHL records
Team	**BOS**	**CHI**	**DET**	**NYR**	**Total**
M. Canadiens	2–2–2	3–1–2	2–3–1	3–1–2	**10–7–7**
M. Maroons	0–4–2	2–4	3–0–3	0–5–1	**5–13–6**
N.Y. Americans	1–3–2	4–0–2	2–2–2	1–4–1	**8–9–7**
Toronto	1–5	2–1–3	4–0–2	2–4	**9–10–5**

== Schedule and results ==
1937–38 regular season
November

Game	Result	Date	Score	Opponent	Record
1	T	November 4, 1937	2–2 OT	Detroit Red Wings (1937–38)	0–0–1
2	W	November 6, 1937	6–3	New York Americans (1937–38)	1–0–1
3	W	November 13, 1937	7–3	Chicago Black Hawks (1937–38)	2–0–1
4	T	November 14, 1937	3–3 OT	@ Chicago Black Hawks (1937–38)	2–0–2
5	T	November 18, 1937	6–6 OT	@ Montreal Canadiens (1937–38)	2–0–3
6	L	November 20, 1937	2–3	Boston Bruins (1937–38)	2–1–3
7	W	November 21, 1937	5–0	@ Detroit Red Wings (1937–38)	3–1–3
8	L	November 23, 1937	1–2	@ Montreal Maroons (1937–38)	3–2–3
9	W	November 25, 1937	3–1	@ New York Rangers (1937–38)	4–2–3
10	W	November 27, 1937	4–0	Montreal Maroons (1937–38)	5–2–3

December

Game	Result	Date	Score	Opponent	Record
11	T	December 4, 1937	3–3 OT	Montreal Canadiens (1937–38)	5–2–4
12	L	December 11, 1937	3–6	New York Rangers (1937–38)	5–3–4
13	L	December 14, 1937	1–3	@ Boston Bruins (1937–38)	5–4–4
14	W	December 16, 1937	4–2	@ Montreal Canadiens (1937–38)	6–4–4
15	W	December 18, 1937	3–2	New York Americans (1937–38)	7–4–4
16	T	December 25, 1937	1–1 OT	Detroit Red Wings (1937–38)	7–4–5
17	W	December 26, 1937	3–1	@ Detroit Red Wings (1937–38)	8–4–5
18	W	December 28, 1937	3–0	@ New York Americans (1937–38)	9–4–5

January

Game	Result	Date	Score	Opponent	Record
19	W	January 1, 1938	6–4	Montreal Canadiens (1937–38)	10–4–5
20	L	January 4, 1938	3–6	@ Boston Bruins (1937–38)	10–5–5
21	L	January 6, 1938	3–6	@ Montreal Maroons (1937–38)	10–6–5
22	W	January 8, 1938	3–2	New York Rangers (1937–38)	11–6–5
23	W	January 13, 1938	3–2	Montreal Maroons (1937–38)	12–6–5
24	T	January 15, 1938	4–4 OT	Chicago Black Hawks (1937–38)	12–6–6
25	W	January 16, 1938	7–2	@ Chicago Black Hawks (1937–38)	13–6–6
26	T	January 20, 1938	1–1 OT	@ New York Americans (1937–38)	13–6–7
27	L	January 22, 1938	1–9	Boston Bruins (1937–38)	13–7–7
28	W	January 29, 1938	4–1	Detroit Red Wings (1937–38)	14–7–7

February

Game	Result	Date	Score	Opponent	Record
29	L	February 1, 1938	1–6	@ Montreal Canadiens (1937–38)	14–8–7
30	W	February 3, 1938	3–0	Montreal Canadiens (1937–38)	15–8–7
31	W	February 5, 1938	3–1	Boston Bruins (1937–38)	16–8–7
32	L	February 6, 1938	1–2	@ New York Rangers (1937–38)	16–9–7
33	W	February 10, 1938	3–0 OT	Montreal Maroons (1937–38)	17–9–7
34	L	February 12, 1938	1–2	Chicago Black Hawks (1937–38)	17–10–7
35	T	February 13, 1938	1–1 OT	@ Chicago Black Hawks (1937–38)	17–10–8
36	W	February 17, 1938	2–1	@ Montreal Maroons (1937–38)	18–10–8
37	L	February 19, 1938	0–4	New York Americans (1937–38)	18–11–8
38	W	February 20, 1938	3–2	@ New York Americans (1937–38)	19–11–8
39	L	February 22, 1938	0–2	@ Boston Bruins (1937–38)	19–12–8
40	L	February 26, 1938	2–4	New York Rangers (1937–38)	19–13–8

March

Game	Result	Date	Score	Opponent	Record
41	W	March 1, 1938	5–3	@ Montreal Maroons (1937–38)	20–13–8
42	W	March 5, 1938	2–0	Montreal Maroons (1937–38)	21–13–8
43	W	March 6, 1938	6–3	@ Montreal Canadiens (1937–38)	22–13–8
44	L	March 8, 1938	3–4	@ New York Rangers (1937–38)	22–14–8
45	T	March 12, 1938	3–3 OT	Montreal Canadiens (1937–38)	22–14–9
46	W	March 17, 1938	7–2	@ Detroit Red Wings (1937–38)	23–14–9
47	W	March 19, 1938	8–5	New York Americans (1937–38)	24–14–9
48	L	March 20, 1938	2–4	@ New York Americans (1937–38)	24–15–9

Legend: Win (2 points) Loss (0 points) Tie (1 point)

== Playoffs ==
The Maple Leafs swept the Boston Bruins in their second round, best of five series. In the finals, they lost to the Chicago Black Hawks in a best of five series 3–1.

== Player statistics ==
=== Regular season ===
Scoring

Player	Pos	GP	G	A	Pts	PIM
Gordie Drillon	RW	48	26	26	52	4
Syl Apps	C	47	21	29	50	9
Bill Thoms	C	48	14	24	38	14
Busher Jackson	LW	48	17	17	34	18
Buzz Boll	LW	44	14	11	25	18
Red Horner	D	47	4	20	24	82
Nick Metz	LW	48	15	7	22	12
Jimmy Fowler	D	48	10	12	22	8
Bob Davidson	LW	48	3	17	20	52
Pep Kelly	RW	43	9	10	19	25
Charlie Conacher	RW	19	7	9	16	6
Murph Chamberlain	LW	43	4	12	16	51
George Parsons	LW	30	5	6	11	6
Reg Hamilton	D	45	1	4	5	43
Bingo Kampman	D	32	1	2	3	56
Murray Armstrong	C	9	0	0	0	0
Turk Broda	G	48	0	0	0	0
Chuck Corrigan	RW	3	0	0	0	0

Goaltending

Player	MIN	GP	W	L	T	GA	GAA	SO
Turk Broda	2980	48	24	15	9	127	2.56	6
Team:	2980	48	24	15	9	127	2.56	6

=== Playoffs ===
Scoring

Player	Pos	GP	G	A	Pts	PIM
Gordie Drillon	RW	7	7	1	8	2
George Parsons	LW	7	3	2	5	11
Syl Apps	C	7	1	4	5	0
Pep Kelly	RW	7	2	2	4	2
Bob Davidson	LW	4	0	2	2	7
Jimmy Fowler	D	7	0	2	2	0
Nick Metz	LW	7	0	2	2	0
Busher Jackson	LW	6	1	0	1	8
Reg Hamilton	D	7	0	1	1	2
Red Horner	D	7	0	1	1	14
Bingo Kampman	D	7	0	1	1	6
Bill Thoms	C	7	0	1	1	0
Murray Armstrong	C	3	0	0	0	0
Buzz Boll	LW	7	0	0	0	2
Turk Broda	G	7	0	0	0	0
Murph Chamberlain	LW	5	0	0	0	2

Goaltending

Player	MIN	GP	W	L	GA	GAA	SO
Turk Broda	452	7	4	3	13	1.73	1
Team:	452	7	4	3	13	1.73	1

Note:

Pos = Position;GP = Games played; G = Goals; A = Assists; Pts = Points; PIM = Penalty minutes; +/- = Plus/minus; PPG = Power-play goals; SHG = Short-handed goals; GWG = Game-winning goals
Pos = Position;GP = Games played; Min, TOI = Minutes played; W = Wins; L = Losses; T,T/OT = Ties; OTL = Overtime losses; GA = Goals-against; GAA = Goals-against average; SO = Shutouts; SA = Shots against; SV = Shots saved;SV% = Save percentage;

== Transactions ==
- September 23, 1937: Traded Hap Day to the New York Americans for cash
- September 23, 1937: Traded Art Jackson to the Boston Bruins for cash and Future Considerations
- October 13, 1937: Signed Free Agent Bill Thomson
- October 17, 1937: Signed Free Agent Chuck Corrigan
- October 17, 1937: Acquired Wally Stanowski from the New York Americans for Jack Shill
- October 27, 1937: Signed Free Agent Pete Langelle

== See also ==
- 1937–38 NHL season
