= 1937–38 Montreal Canadiens season =

NHL hockey team season

1937–38 Montreal Canadiens
- Division: 3rd Canadian
- 1937–38 record: 18–17–13
- Home record: 13–5–6
- Road record: 5–12–7
- Goals for: 123
- Goals against: 128

Team information
- General manager: Cecil Hart
- Coach: Cecil Hart
- Captain: Babe Siebert
- Arena: Montreal Forum

Team leaders
- Goals: Georges Mantha (23)
- Assists: Paul Haynes (22)
- Points: Georges Mantha (42)
- Penalty minutes: Babe Siebert (56)
- Wins: Wilf Cude (18)
- Goals against average: Wilf Cude (2.53)

The 1937–38 Montreal Canadiens season was the team's 29th season of play. The Canadiens placed third in the Canadian Division and qualified for the playoffs. Montreal met and lost to the eventual Stanley Cup champion Chicago Black Hawks in the quarter-finals.

== Regular season ==
A Morenz Benefit All-Star game was held at the Forum on November 2, 1937. 8,683 fans attended, contributing $11,447 to a total pot of over $20,000 for Howie Morenz's family.

This was the last season for Pit Lepine, Aurel Joliat and Marty Burke. Burke had returned from Chicago in a trade for Bill MacKenzie.

=== Final standings ===
Canadian Division
	GP	W	L	T	GF	GA	PTS
**Toronto Maple Leafs**	48	24	15	9	151	127	57
**New York Americans**	48	19	18	11	110	111	49
**Montreal Canadiens**	48	18	17	13	123	128	49
Montreal Maroons	48	12	30	6	101	149	30

Note: W = Wins, L = Losses, T = Ties, GF = Goals For, GA = Goals Against, Pts = Points
Teams that qualified for the playoffs are highlighted in bold.

=== Record vs. opponents ===
==== Vs. Canadian Division ====
1937–38 NHL records
Team	**MTL**	**MTM**	**NYA**	**TOR**	**Total**
M. Canadiens	—	4–4	3–2–3	1–4–3	**8–10–6**
M. Maroons	4–4	—	1–7	2–6	**7–17–0**
N.Y. Americans	2–3–3	7–1	—	2–5–1	**11–9–4**
Toronto	4–1–3	6–2	5–2–1	—	**15–5–4**

==== Vs. American Division ====
1937–38 NHL records
Team	**BOS**	**CHI**	**DET**	**NYR**	**Total**
M. Canadiens	2–2–2	3–1–2	2–3–1	3–1–2	**10–7–7**
M. Maroons	0–4–2	2–4	3–0–3	0–5–1	**5–13–6**
N.Y. Americans	1–3–2	4–0–2	2–2–2	1–4–1	**8–9–7**
Toronto	1–5	2–1–3	4–0–2	2–4	**9–10–5**

== Schedule and results ==
1937–38 regular season
November

Game	Result	Date	Score	Opponent	Record
1	T	November 9, 1937	2–2 OT	Chicago Black Hawks (1937–38)	0–0–1
2	L	November 11, 1937	0–3	@ Montreal Maroons (1937–38)	0–1–1
3	W	November 13, 1937	5–2	Detroit Red Wings (1937–38)	1–1–1
4	L	November 14, 1937	1–2	@ Detroit Red Wings (1937–38)	1–2–1
5	T	November 18, 1937	6–6 OT	Toronto Maple Leafs (1937–38)	1–2–2
6	T	November 23, 1937	1–1 OT	@ Boston Bruins (1937–38)	1–2–3
7	W	November 27, 1937	2–1	New York Rangers (1937–38)	2–2–3

December

Game	Result	Date	Score	Opponent	Record
8	W	December 2, 1937	2–0	Boston Bruins (1937–38)	3–2–3
9	T	December 4, 1937	3–3 OT	@ Toronto Maple Leafs (1937–38)	3–2–4
10	W	December 5, 1937	3–2	@ Chicago Black Hawks (1937–38)	4–2–4
11	W	December 7, 1937	5–1	Montreal Maroons (1937–38)	5–2–4
12	W	December 11, 1937	4–3 OT	New York Americans (1937–38)	6–2–4
13	T	December 12, 1937	4–4 OT	@ New York Americans (1937–38)	6–2–5
14	L	December 14, 1937	2–3 OT	@ Montreal Maroons (1937–38)	6–3–5
15	L	December 16, 1937	2–4	Toronto Maple Leafs (1937–38)	6–4–5
16	T	December 19, 1937	2–2 OT	@ New York Rangers (1937–38)	6–4–6
17	W	December 28, 1937	2–0	Montreal Maroons (1937–38)	7–4–6

January

Game	Result	Date	Score	Opponent	Record
18	L	January 1, 1938	4–6	@ Toronto Maple Leafs (1937–38)	7–5–6
19	W	January 2, 1938	4–2	@ Chicago Black Hawks (1937–38)	8–5–6
20	L	January 4, 1938	0–3	Detroit Red Wings (1937–38)	8–6–6
21	W	January 8, 1938	6–2	Boston Bruins (1937–38)	9–6–6
22	L	January 11, 1938	7–11	@ Montreal Maroons (1937–38)	9–7–6
23	T	January 13, 1938	2–2 OT	Chicago Black Hawks (1937–38)	9–7–7
24	L	January 16, 1938	0–1	@ Boston Bruins (1937–38)	9–8–7
25	L	January 18, 1938	1–3 OT	@ New York Rangers (1937–38)	9–9–7
26	L	January 20, 1938	2–4	Montreal Maroons (1937–38)	9–10–7
27	W	January 22, 1938	4–0	New York Americans (1937–38)	10–10–7
28	W	January 27, 1938	4–2	New York Rangers (1937–38)	11–10–7
29	W	January 30, 1938	4–2	@ New York Americans (1937–38)	12–10–7

February

Game	Result	Date	Score	Opponent	Record
30	W	February 1, 1938	6–1	Toronto Maple Leafs (1937–38)	13–10–7
31	L	February 3, 1938	0–3	@ Toronto Maple Leafs (1937–38)	13–11–7
32	T	February 5, 1938	3–3 OT	New York Americans (1937–38)	13–11–8
33	L	February 6, 1938	0–8	@ Detroit Red Wings (1937–38)	13–12–8
34	W	February 10, 1938	2–1	Chicago Black Hawks (1937–38)	14–12–8
35	L	February 13, 1938	0–1 OT	@ Boston Bruins (1937–38)	14–13–8
36	L	February 15, 1938	0–4	@ New York Americans (1937–38)	14–14–8
37	W	February 19, 1938	4–3 OT	Montreal Maroons (1937–38)	15–14–8
38	W	February 22, 1938	2–1	@ New York Rangers (1937–38)	16–14–8
39	T	February 24, 1938	1–1 OT	Boston Bruins (1937–38)	16–14–9
40	T	February 27, 1938	1–1 OT	@ Detroit Red Wings (1937–38)	16–14–10

March

Game	Result	Date	Score	Opponent	Record
41	L	March 1, 1938	2–4	@ New York Americans (1937–38)	16–15–10
42	T	March 3, 1938	1–1 OT	New York Americans (1937–38)	16–15–11
43	L	March 6, 1938	3–6	Toronto Maple Leafs (1937–38)	16–16–11
44	L	March 10, 1938	1–4	@ Chicago Black Hawks (1937–38)	16–17–11
45	T	March 12, 1938	3–3 OT	@ Toronto Maple Leafs (1937–38)	16–17–12
46	W	March 15, 1938	3–2	Detroit Red Wings (1937–38)	17–17–12
47	W	March 17, 1938	6–3	@ Montreal Maroons (1937–38)	18–17–12
48	T	March 19, 1938	1–1 OT	New York Rangers (1937–38)	18–17–13

Legend: Win (2 points) Loss (0 points) Tie (1 point)

== Playoffs ==
The Canadiens drew the third-place finisher of the American division, the Chicago Blackhawks. Montreal lost the best-of-three series 2–1.

== Player statistics ==
=== Regular season ===
==== Scoring ====
Player	Pos	GP	G	A	Pts	PIM
Georges Mantha	D/LW	47	23	19	42	12
Paul Haynes	C	48	13	22	35	25
Toe Blake	LW	43	17	16	33	33
Rod Lorrain	RW	48	13	19	32	14
Johnny Gagnon	RW	47	13	17	30	9
Polly Drouin	LW	31	7	13	20	8
Babe Siebert	LW/D	37	8	11	19	56
Pit Lepine	C	47	5	14	19	24
Walt Buswell	D	48	2	15	17	24
Joffre Desilets	RW	32	6	7	13	6
Aurel Joliat	LW	44	6	7	13	24
Red Goupille	D	47	4	5	9	44
Don Willson	C	18	2	7	9	0
George Brown	C	34	1	7	8	14
Armand Mondou	LW	7	2	4	6	0
Marty Burke	D	38	0	5	5	31
Gus Mancuso	RW	17	1	1	2	4
Armand Raymond	D	11	0	1	1	10
Oscar Asmundson	C	2	0	0	0	0
Wilf Cude	G	47	0	0	0	0
Tony Demers	RW	6	0	0	0	0
Paul Gauthier	G	1	0	0	0	0
Bill MacKenzie	D	11	0	0	0	4

==== Goaltending ====
Player	MIN	GP	W	L	T	GA	GAA	SO
Wilf Cude	2990	47	18	17	12	126	2.53	3
Paul Gauthier	70	1	0	0	1	2	1.71	0
Team:	3060	48	18	17	13	128	2.51	3

=== Playoffs ===
==== Scoring ====
Player	Pos	GP	G	A	Pts	PIM
Toe Blake	LW	3	3	1	4	2
Johnny Gagnon	RW	3	1	3	4	2
Paul Haynes	C	3	0	4	4	5
Red Goupille	D	3	2	0	2	4
Babe Siebert	LW/D	3	1	1	2	0
Georges Mantha	D/LW	3	1	0	1	0
George Brown	C	3	0	0	0	2
Walt Buswell	D	3	0	0	0	0
Wilf Cude	G	3	0	0	0	0
Joffre Desilets	RW	2	0	0	0	7
Polly Drouin	LW	1	0	0	0	0
Pit Lepine	C	3	0	0	0	0
Rod Lorrain	RW	3	0	0	0	0
Bill Summerhill	RW	1	0	0	0	0
Don Willson	C	3	0	0	0	0

==== Goaltending ====
Player	MIN	GP	W	L	GA	GAA	SO
Wilf Cude	192	3	1	2	11	3.44	0
Team:	192	3	1	2	11	3.44	0

Note:

Pos = Position;GP = Games played; G = Goals; A = Assists; Pts = Points; PIM = Penalty minutes; +/- = Plus/minus; PPG = Power-play goals; SHG = Short-handed goals; GWG = Game-winning goals
Pos = Position;GP = Games played; Min, TOI = Minutes played; W = Wins; L = Losses; T,T/OT = Ties; OTL = Overtime losses; GA = Goals-against; GAA = Goals-against average; SO = Shutouts; SA = Shots against; SV = Shots saved;SV% = Save percentage;

== European tour ==
After losing in the playoffs, the Canadiens embarked on a tour of Europe with the Detroit Red Wings. Prior to departure, the two teams played three exhibition games in Nova Scotia. In Europe, the teams played a nine-game series in England and France. The Canadiens won the series with a record of 5–3–1

== Awards and records ==
- Toe Blake – NHL Second All-Star team
- Babe Siebert – NHL First All-Star team

== See also ==
- 1937–38 NHL season
