= 1937–38 Chicago Black Hawks season =

NHL ice hockey team season (won Stanley Cup)

1937–38 Chicago Black Hawks
- Stanley Cup champions
- Division: 3rd American
- 1937–38 record: 14–25–9
- Home record: 10–10–4
- Road record: 4–15–5
- Goals for: 97
- Goals against: 139

Team information
- General manager: Frederic McLaughlin
- Coach: Bill Stewart
- Captain: Johnny Gottselig
- Arena: Chicago Stadium

Team leaders
- Goals: Paul Thompson (22)
- Assists: Paul Thompson and Doc Romnes (22)
- Points: Paul Thompson (44)
- Penalty minutes: Earl Seibert (38)
- Wins: Mike Karakas (14)
- Goals against average: Mike Karakas (2.80)

The 1937–38 Chicago Black Hawks season was the team's 12th season in the NHL. They were attempting to bounce off a horrible 1936–37 season, in which the club failed to qualify for the playoffs. In the off-season, the team would replace head coach Clem Loughlin with Bill Stewart. The Black Hawks would struggle again in 1937–38, finishing with 37 points with a 14–25–9 record, but managed to earn a playoff spot by finishing two points ahead of the Detroit Red Wings and clinch third place in the American Division. They would score an NHL low 97 goals, while giving up the 2nd most goals in the league at 139. The Hawks were a .500 team at home with a 10–10–4 record, but would only have a record of 4–15–5 on the road.

Paul Thompson would lead the Hawks offensively, setting a club record with 44 points, along with a club high 22 goals, and tying Doc Romnes for the team lead with 22 assists. Johnny Gottselig would have another solid season, earning 32 points, tying Romnes for 2nd on the team scoring list. Earl Seibert would lead the defense with 21 points, and had a club high 38 penalty minutes.

In goal, Mike Karakas would win 14 games, earn a shutout and post a 2.80 GAA.

In the playoffs, the Black Hawks would face the Montreal Canadiens in the 1st round in a best-of-three series. The underdog Hawks would surprise Montreal, winning the best-of three series in the full three games, clinching the series with a 3–2 OT victory at the Montreal Forum. After losing Game One to Montreal, the Hawks were less than 90 seconds away from being eliminated in the quarterfinals, but managed to tie Game three late in the third period. Chicago won the crucial game in overtime. Next up would be the New York Americans, who finished 2nd in the Canadian Division, and had 12 more points than the Hawks in the regular season. In a best-of-three semi-final series, the Black Hawks again lost the first game of the series and were on the verge of elimination in Game Two but won it in overtime. The Black Hawks would stun the favored Americans, winning the Game Three to win the series 2–1 and advance to the Stanley Cup Final. The Hawks opponent would be the Toronto Maple Leafs, who had just swept the best team in the regular season, the Boston Bruins, in a best-of-five semi-final series featuring the champions of the NHL's two divisions.

Due to an injury to goaltender Mike Karakas, the Black Hawks would get permission by the Leafs to use goaltender Alfie Moore, who spent the season with the Pittsburgh Hornets of the IAHL in the first game, and he responded by helping the Black Hawks win the game 3–1. In the 2nd game, Karakas was still unavailable, and Chicago would call up Paul Goodman from the Wichita Skyhawks of the AHA. The Maple Leafs would even up the series with a 5–1 victory. The Black Hawks would get Karakas back into the lineup for the 3rd game, and he helped the Hawks to a 2–1 victory. Chicago would then wrap up the series in the 4th game, winning by a score of 4–1 to earn its 2nd Stanley Cup in team history, shocking the hockey world.

== Season standings ==
American Division
	GP	W	L	T	GF	GA	PTS
**Boston Bruins**	48	30	11	7	142	89	67
**New York Rangers**	48	27	15	6	149	96	60
**Chicago Black Hawks**	48	14	25	9	97	139	37
Detroit Red Wings	48	12	25	11	99	133	35

Note: GP = Games Played, W = Wins, L = Losses, T = Ties, Pts = Points, GF = Goals For, GA = Goals Against
Teams that qualified for the playoffs are highlighted in bold.

=== Record vs. opponents ===
==== Vs. American Division ====
1937–38 NHL records
Team	**BOS**	**CHI**	**DET**	**NYR**	**Total**
Boston	—	6–2	5–2–1	5–3	**16–7–1**
Chicago	2–6	—	3–4–1	3–4–1	**6–14–2**
Detroit	2–5–1	4–3–1	—	1–6–1	**7–14–3**
N.Y. Rangers	3–5	4–3–1	6–1–1	—	**13–9–2**

==== Vs. Canadian Division ====
1937–38 NHL records
Team	**MTL**	**MTM**	**NYA**	**TOR**	**Total**
Boston	2–2–2	4–0–2	3–1–2	2–2–2	**11–5–8**
Chicago	1–3–2	4–2	0–4–2	1–2–3	**6–11–7**
Detroit	3–2–1	0–3–3	2–2–2	0–4–2	**5–11–8**
N.Y. Rangers	1–3–2	5–0–1	4–1–1	4–2	**14–6–4**

== Schedule and results ==
=== Regular season ===
1937–38 regular season
November

Game	Date	Visitor	Score	Home	Record	Points
1	November 4	New York Americans	3–0	Chicago Black Hawks	0–1–0	0
2	November 9	Chicago Black Hawks	2–2	Montreal Canadiens	0–1–1	1
3	November 11	Chicago Black Hawks	3–1	New York Rangers	1–1–1	3
4	November 13	Chicago Black Hawks	3–7	Toronto Maple Leafs	1–2–1	3
5	November 14	Toronto Maple Leafs	3–3	Chicago Black Hawks	1–2–2	4
6	November 18	Detroit Red Wings	1–3	Chicago Black Hawks	2–2–2	6
7	November 21	Boston Bruins	2–1	Chicago Black Hawks	2–3–2	6
8	November 25	Chicago Black Hawks	1–4	Detroit Red Wings	2–4–2	6
9	November 27	Chicago Black Hawks	0–4	New York Americans	2–5–2	6
10	November 30	Chicago Black Hawks	0–1	Montreal Maroons	2–6–2	6

December

Game	Date	Visitor	Score	Home	Record	Points
11	December 2	New York Rangers	1–2	Chicago Black Hawks	3–6–2	8
12	December 5	Montreal Canadiens	3–2	Chicago Black Hawks	3–7–2	8
13	December 12	Montreal Maroons	2–3	Chicago Black Hawks	4–7–2	10
14	December 16	Detroit Red Wings	1–3	Chicago Black Hawks	5–7–2	12
15	December 19	New York Americans	1–0	Chicago Black Hawks	5–8–2	12
16	December 21	Chicago Black Hawks	1–2	Boston Bruins	5–9–2	12
17	December 26	Chicago Black Hawks	3–1	New York Rangers	6–9–2	14
18	December 30	Chicago Black Hawks	2–2	Detroit Red Wings	6–9–3	15

January

Game	Date	Visitor	Score	Home	Record	Points
19	January 2	Montreal Canadiens	4–2	Chicago Black Hawks	6–10–3	15
20	January 6	New York Rangers	4–1	Chicago Black Hawks	6–11–3	15
21	January 9	Montreal Maroons	0–1	Chicago Black Hawks	7–11–3	17
22	January 11	Chicago Black Hawks	1–1	New York Americans	7–11–4	18
23	January 13	Chicago Black Hawks	2–2	Montreal Canadiens	7–11–5	19
24	January 15	Chicago Black Hawks	4–4	Toronto Maple Leafs	7–11–6	20
25	January 16	Toronto Maple Leafs	7–2	Chicago Black Hawks	7–12–6	20
26	January 18	Chicago Black Hawks	1–5	Boston Bruins	7–13–6	20
27	January 20	Chicago Black Hawks	2–4	Detroit Red Wings	7–14–6	20
28	January 23	Boston Bruins	2–3	Chicago Black Hawks	8–14–6	22
29	January 27	Detroit Red Wings	3–4	Chicago Black Hawks	9–14–6	24
30	January 30	New York Rangers	2–2	Chicago Black Hawks	9–14–7	25

February

Game	Date	Visitor	Score	Home	Record	Points
31	February 1	Chicago Black Hawks	1–6	New York Rangers	9–15–7	25
32	February 3	Chicago Black Hawks	2–4	Montreal Maroons	9–16–7	25
33	February 6	Boston Bruins	7–2	Chicago Black Hawks	9–17–7	25
34	February 8	Chicago Black Hawks	1–3	Boston Bruins	9–18–7	25
35	February 10	Chicago Black Hawks	1–2	Montreal Maroons	9–19–7	25
36	February 12	Chicago Black Hawks	2–1	Toronto Maple Leafs	10–19–7	27
37	February 13	Toronto Maple Leafs	1–1	Chicago Black Hawks	10–19–8	28
38	February 17	New York Americans	3–3	Chicago Black Hawks	10–19–9	29
39	February 20	Detroit Red Wings	1–0	Chicago Black Hawks	10–20–9	29
40	February 22	Chicago Black Hawks	6–5	Montreal Maroons	11–20–9	31
41	February 24	Chicago Black Hawks	3–6	New York Rangers	11–21–9	31
42	February 27	New York Rangers	4–1	Chicago Black Hawks	11–22–9	31

March

Game	Date	Visitor	Score	Home	Record	Points
43	March 3	Boston Bruins	2–3	Chicago Black Hawks	12–22–9	33
44	March 6	Montreal Maroons	1–7	Chicago Black Hawks	13–22–9	35
45	March 10	Montreal Canadiens	1–4	Chicago Black Hawks	14–22–9	37
46	March 13	Chicago Black Hawks	1–5	Detroit Red Wings	14–23–9	37
47	March 15	Chicago Black Hawks	1–2	New York Americans	14–24–9	37
48	March 20	Chicago Black Hawks	1–6	Boston Bruins	14–25–9	37

Legend: Win (2 points) Loss (0 points) Tie (1 point)

== Playoffs ==
=== Black Hawks 2, Canadiens 1 ===
==== NHL quarter-finals ====
===== (C3) Montreal Canadiens vs. (A3) Chicago Black Hawks =====
March 22	Chicago Black Hawks	4 – 6	Montreal Canadiens	Montreal Forum	Recap
Thompson (1) – (March, Romnes) – 1:31		First period	10:58 – Siebert (1) – (Haynes, Gagnon)
March (1) – (Siebert) – 12:23		Second period	13:38 – pp – Blake (1) – (Siebert), Gagnon); 18:45 – Goupille (1) – (Unassisted)
Gottselig (1) – (Romnes, March) – 9:30; Dahlstrom (1) – (Jenkins, Shill) – 11:51		Third period	11:32 – Blake (2) – (Gagnon, Haynes); 17:32 – Blake (3) – (Unassisted); 18:40 – Goupille – (Haynes)
Karakas (0-1)		Goalie stats	Cude (1-0)

March 24	Montreal Canadiens	0 – 4	Chicago Black Hawks	Chicago Stadium	Recap
No scoring		First period	17:58 – Siebert (1) – (Unassisted)
No scoring		Second period	No scoring
No scoring		Third period	10:06 – Siebert (2) – (Unassisted); 13:34 – Gottselig (1) – (Voss, Jenkins); 19:59 – Thompson (1) – (March, Voss)
Cude (1-1)		Goalie stats	Karakas (1-1)

March 26	Chicago Black Hawks	3 – 2	OT	Montreal Canadiens	Montreal Forum	Recap
Gottselig (3) – (MacKenzie) – 18:24		First period		No scoring
No scoring		Second period		8:52 – Gagnon (1) – (Blake, Haynes)
Siebert (3) – (Gottselig) – 18:34		Third period		12:46 – pp – Mantha (1) – (Unassisted)
Thompson (3) – (Trudel) – 11:49		First overtime period		No scoring
Karakas (2-1)		Goalie stats		Cude (1-2)

Chicago wins series 2 – 1

=== Black Hawks 2, Americans 1 ===
==== NHL semi-finals ====
===== (C2) New York Americans vs. (A3) Chicago Black Hawks =====
March 29	Chicago Black Hawks	1 – 3	New York Americans	Madison Square Garden	Recap
Voss (1) – (Jenkins) – 5:19		First period	No scoring
No scoring		Second period	16:47 – Stewart (2) – (Carr, Anderson)
No scoring		Third period	15:52 – Sorrell (4) – (Beattie, Smith); 19:08 – pp – Schriner (1) – (Anderson)
Karakas (2-2)		Goalie stats	Robertson (3-1)

March 31	New York Americans	0 – 1	2OT	Chicago Black Hawks	Chicago Stadium	Recap
No scoring		First period		No scoring
No scoring		Second period		No scoring
No scoring		Third period		No scoring
No scoring		Second overtime period		13:01 – Dahlstrom (2) – (Trudel)
Robertson (3-2)		Goalie stats		Karakas (3-2)

April 3	Chicago Black Hawks	3 – 2	New York Americans	Madison Square Garden	Recap
No scoring		First period	19:40 pp – Carr (3) – (Stewart, Anderson)
Siebert (4) – (Jenkins, Wiebe) – 14:53; Levinsky (1) – (Shill) – 17:43		Second period	No scoring
Romnes (1) – (Thompson) – 15:53		Third period	16:29 – Beattie (2) – (Smith, Anderson)
Karakas (4-2)		Goalie stats	Robertson (3-3)

Chicago wins series 2 – 1

=== Black Hawks 3, Maple Leafs 1 ===
==== Stanley Cup finals ====
===== (C1) Toronto Maple Leafs vs. (A3) Chicago Black Hawks =====
April 5	Chicago Black Hawks	3 – 1	Toronto Maple Leafs	Maple Leaf Gardens	Recap
Gottselig (4) – pp – (Dahlstrom, Romnes) – 19:08		First period	1:54 – Drillon (4) – (Davidson)
Thompson (4) – (Siebert) – 1:51		Second period	No scoring
Gottselig (5) – (Unassisted) – 12:08		Third period	No scoring
Moore (1-0)		Goalie stats	Broda (3-1)

April 7	Chicago Black Hawks	1 – 5	Toronto Maple Leafs	Maple Leaf Gardens	Recap
Siebert (5) – pp – (Unassisted) – 8:31		First period	1:42 – Drillon (5) – (Apps)
No scoring		Second period	6:10 – Jackson (1) – (Thoms)
No scoring		Third period	9:44 – Drillon (6) – (Apps, Hamilton); 11:29 – Parsons (2) – (Kelly, Fowler); 12:08 – Parsons (3) – (Kelly, Horner)
Goodman (0-1)		Goalie stats	Broda (4-1)

April 10	Toronto Maple Leafs	1 – 2	Chicago Black Hawks	Chicago Stadium	Recap
Apps (1) – pp – (Drillon, Davidson) – 1:35		First period	No scoring
No scoring		Second period	16:02 – Voss (2) – (Jenkins, Gottselig)
No scoring		Third period	15:55 – Romnes (2) – (March, Thompson)
Broda (4-2)		Goalie stats	Karakas (5-2)

April 12	Toronto Maple Leafs	1 – 4	Chicago Black Hawks	Chicago Stadium	Recap
Drillon (7) – (Fowler) – 8:26		First period	5:52 – Dahlstrom (3) – (Shill, Trudel)
No scoring		Second period	16:45 – Voss (3) – (Gottselig, Jenkins); 17:58 – Shill (1) – (Unassisted)
No scoring		Third period	16:24 – March (2) – (Romnes, Thompson)
Broda (4-3)		Goalie stats	Karakas (6-2)

Chicago wins series 3 – 1

== Season stats ==
=== Scoring leaders ===
Player	GP	G	A	Pts	PIM
Paul Thompson	48	22	22	44	14
Johnny Gottselig	48	13	19	32	22
Doc Romnes	44	10	22	32	4
Mush March	42	11	17	28	16
Louis Trudel	42	6	16	22	15

=== Goaltending ===
Player	GP	TOI	W	L	T	GA	SO	GAA
Mike Karakas	48	2980	14	25	9	139	1	2.80

== Playoff stats ==
=== Scoring leaders ===
Player	GP	G	A	Pts	PIM
Johnny Gottselig	10	5	3	8	4
Earl Seibert	10	5	2	7	12
Paul Thompson	10	4	3	7	6
Mush March	9	2	4	6	0
Doc Romnes	10	2	4	6	2

=== Goaltending ===
Player	GP	TOI	W	L	GA	SO	GAA
Alfie Moore	1	60	1	0	1	0	1.00
Mike Karakas	8	525	6	2	15	2	1.71
Paul Goodman	1	60	0	1	5	0	5.00
