= 1937–38 Montreal Maroons season =

National Hockey League team season

1937–38 Montreal Maroons
- Division: 4th Canadian
- 1937–38 record: 12–30–6
- Home record: 9–13–2
- Road record: 3–17–4
- Goals for: 101
- Goals against: 149

Team information
- General manager: Tommy Gorman
- Coach: King Clancy (Sep–Dec); Tommy Gorman (Jan-Mar)
- Captain: Stewart Evans
- Arena: Montreal Forum

Team leaders
- Goals: Bob Gracie (12)
- Assists: Herb Cain (19); Bob Gracie (19)
- Points: Bob Gracie (31)
- Penalty minutes: Allan Shields (67)
- Wins: Bill Beveridge (12)
- Goals against average: Bill Beveridge (3.00)

The 1937–38 Montreal Maroons season was the 14th and last season of the Montreal Maroons. The team finished in last place in the Canadian Division. The team and franchise were dissolved after the season.

== Offseason ==
On September 24, 1937, Tommy Gorman hired King Clancy from the Toronto Maple Leafs to take over as coach of the Maroons. Clancy had retired as a player partway through the previous season, and had been acting as a 'goodwill ambassador' for the Maple Leafs organization. The Leafs did not ask for any compensation.

== Regular season ==
King Clancy's time as coach ended with his resignation on December 30, 1937. The Maroons were holding a 6–11–1 record. Gorman took over on an interim basis. The team would be taken over by Tommy Gorman, who would lead them to a 6–19–5 record. The Maroons scored 101 goals (only good for 6th in the 8 team league), but allowed 149 goals (dead last) to finish dead last in their final season. The team would soon be dormant, as the backers tried to move the team to St. Louis. When that failed, the team tried to sell to a Philadelphia group, but failed due to the lack of a suitable arena. Len Peto failed to find a suitable arena by the end of the 1946–47 NHL season, as the team dissolved for good.

=== Final standings ===
Canadian Division
	GP	W	L	T	GF	GA	PTS
**Toronto Maple Leafs**	48	24	15	9	151	127	57
**New York Americans**	48	19	18	11	110	111	49
**Montreal Canadiens**	48	18	17	13	123	128	49
Montreal Maroons	48	12	30	6	101	149	30

Note: W = Wins, L = Losses, T = Ties, GF = Goals For, GA = Goals Against, Pts = Points
Teams that qualified for the playoffs are highlighted in bold.

=== Record vs. opponents ===
==== Vs. Canadian Division ====
1937–38 NHL records
Team	**MTL**	**MTM**	**NYA**	**TOR**	**Total**
M. Canadiens	—	4–4	3–2–3	1–4–3	**8–10–6**
M. Maroons	4–4	—	1–7	2–6	**7–17–0**
N.Y. Americans	2–3–3	7–1	—	2–5–1	**11–9–4**
Toronto	4–1–3	6–2	5–2–1	—	**15–5–4**

==== Vs. American Division ====
1937–38 NHL records
Team	**BOS**	**CHI**	**DET**	**NYR**	**Total**
M. Canadiens	2–2–2	3–1–2	2–3–1	3–1–2	**10–7–7**
M. Maroons	0–4–2	2–4	3–0–3	0–5–1	**5–13–6**
N.Y. Americans	1–3–2	4–0–2	2–2–2	1–4–1	**8–9–7**
Toronto	1–5	2–1–3	4–0–2	2–4	**9–10–5**

== Schedule and results ==
1937–38 regular season
November

Game	Result	Date	Score	Opponent	Record
1	L	November 6, 1937	2–4	Boston Bruins (1937–38)	0–1–0
2	W	November 11, 1937	3–0	Montreal Canadiens (1937–38)	1–1–0
3	L	November 14, 1937	0–2	@ New York Americans (1937–38)	1–2–0
4	L	November 16, 1937	0–1	@ Boston Bruins (1937–38)	1–3–0
5	L	November 20, 1937	0–3	New York Rangers (1937–38)	1–4–0
6	T	November 21, 1937	3–3 OT	@ New York Rangers (1937–38)	1–4–1
7	W	November 23, 1937	2–1	Toronto Maple Leafs (1937–38)	2–4–1
8	L	November 27, 1937	0–4	@ Toronto Maple Leafs (1937–38)	2–5–1
9	W	November 28, 1937	3–1	@ Detroit Red Wings (1937–38)	3–5–1
10	W	November 30, 1937	1–0	Chicago Black Hawks (1937–38)	4–5–1

December

Game	Result	Date	Score	Opponent	Record
11	L	December 4, 1937	1–3	New York Americans (1937–38)	4–6–1
12	L	December 7, 1937	1–5	@ Montreal Canadiens (1937–38)	4–7–1
13	W	December 9, 1937	5–2	Detroit Red Wings (1937–38)	5–7–1
14	L	December 12, 1937	2–3	@ Chicago Black Hawks (1937–38)	5–8–1
15	W	December 14, 1937	3–2 OT	Montreal Canadiens (1937–38)	6–8–1
16	L	December 18, 1937	1–3	Boston Bruins (1937–38)	6–9–1
17	L	December 23, 1937	0–4	New York Rangers (1937–38)	6–10–1
18	L	December 25, 1937	0–2	@ Montreal Canadiens (1937–38)	6–11–1

January

Game	Result	Date	Score	Opponent	Record
19	L	January 1, 1938	1–3	New York Americans (1937–38)	6–12–1
20	L	January 2, 1938	1–2	@ New York Americans (1937–38)	6–13–1
21	W	January 6, 1938	6–3	Toronto Maple Leafs (1937–38)	7–13–1
22	L	January 9, 1938	0–1	@ Chicago Black Hawks (1937–38)	7–14–1
23	W	January 11, 1938	11–7	Montreal Canadiens (1937–38)	8–14–1
24	L	January 13, 1938	2–3	@ Toronto Maple Leafs (1937–38)	8–15–1
25	T	January 15, 1938	2–2 OT	Detroit Red Wings (1937–38)	8–15–2
26	T	January 16, 1938	1–1 OT	@ Detroit Red Wings (1937–38)	8–15–3
27	W	January 20, 1938	4–2	@ Montreal Canadiens (1937–38)	9–15–3
28	L	January 23, 1938	2–8	@ New York Rangers (1937–38)	9–16–3
29	T	January 29, 1938	2–2 OT	Boston Bruins (1937–38)	9–16–4

February

Game	Result	Date	Score	Opponent	Record
30	W	February 3, 1938	4–2	Chicago Black Hawks (1937–38)	10–16–4
31	L	February 8, 1938	1–3	@ New York Americans (1937–38)	10–17–4
32	L	February 10, 1938	0–3 OT	@ Toronto Maple Leafs (1937–38)	10–18–4
33	L	February 12, 1938	3–5	New York Rangers (1937–38)	10–19–4
34	L	February 13, 1938	1–4	@ New York Rangers (1937–38)	10–20–4
35	L	February 15, 1938	2–5	@ Boston Bruins (1937–38)	10–21–4
36	L	February 17, 1938	1–2	Toronto Maple Leafs (1937–38)	10–22–4
37	L	February 19, 1938	3–4 OT	@ Montreal Canadiens (1937–38)	10–23–4
38	L	February 22, 1938	5–6	Chicago Black Hawks (1937–38)	10–24–4
39	T	February 24, 1938	2–2 OT	@ Detroit Red Wings (1937–38)	10–24–5
40	L	February 26, 1938	1–5	New York Americans (1937–38)	10–25–5
41	W	February 27, 1938	4–2	@ New York Americans (1937–38)	11–25–5

March

Game	Result	Date	Score	Opponent	Record
42	L	March 1, 1938	3–5	Toronto Maple Leafs (1937–38)	11–26–5
43	L	March 5, 1938	0–2	@ Toronto Maple Leafs (1937–38)	11–27–5
44	L	March 6, 1938	1–7	@ Chicago Black Hawks (1937–38)	11–28–5
45	W	March 10, 1938	3–2	Detroit Red Wings (1937–38)	12–28–5
46	L	March 12, 1938	1–3	New York Americans (1937–38)	12–29–5
47	T	March 15, 1938	4–4 OT	@ Boston Bruins (1937–38)	12–29–6
48	L	March 17, 1938	3–6	Montreal Canadiens (1937–38)	12–30–6

Legend: Win (2 points) Loss (0 points) Tie (1 point)

== Player statistics ==
=== Regular season ===
Scoring

Player	Pos	GP	G	A	Pts	PIM
Bob Gracie	C/LW	48	12	19	31	32
Herb Cain	LW	47	11	19	30	10
Jimmy Ward	RW	48	11	15	26	34
Gus Marker	RW	48	9	15	24	35
Baldy Northcott	D/LW	46	11	12	23	50
Russ Blinco	C	47	10	9	19	4
Dave Trottier	LW	47	9	10	19	42
Stewart Evans	D	48	5	11	16	59
Paul Runge	C/LW	39	5	7	12	21
Al Shields	D	48	5	7	12	67
Earl Robinson	RW/C	39	4	7	11	13
Cy Wentworth	D	48	4	5	9	32
Tom Cook	C	21	2	4	6	0
Des Smith	D	40	3	1	4	47
Gerry Shannon	LW	36	0	3	3	20
Bill Beveridge	G	48	0	0	0	0
Maurice Croghan	D	16	0	0	0	4
Carl Voss	C	3	0	0	0	0

Goaltending

Player	MIN	GP	W	L	T	GA	GAA	SO
Bill Beveridge	2980	48	12	30	6	149	3.00	2
Team:	2980	48	12	30	6	149	3.00	2

Note: GP = Games played; G = Goals; A = Assists; Pts = Points; +/- = Plus/minus; PIM = Penalty minutes; PPG = Power-play goals; SHG = Short-handed goals; GWG = Game-winning goals
MIN = Minutes played; W = Wins; L = Losses; T = Ties; GA = Goals against; GAA = Goals against average; SO = Shutouts;

== See also ==
- 1937–38 NHL season
