= 1937–38 Boston Bruins season =

NHL team season

1937–38 Boston Bruins
- American Division champions
- Division: 1st American
- 1937–38 record: 30–11–7
- Home record: 18–3–3
- Road record: 12–8–4
- Goals for: 142
- Goals against: 89

Team information
- General manager: Art Ross
- Coach: Art Ross
- Captain: Cooney Weiland
- Arena: Boston Garden

Team leaders
- Goals: Bobby Bauer (20)
- Assists: Bill Cowley (22)
- Points: Bill Cowley (39)
- Penalty minutes: Flash Hollett (54)
- Wins: Tiny Thompson (30)
- Goals against average: Tiny Thompson (1.80)

The 1937–38 Boston Bruins season was the Bruins' 14th season in the NHL.

== Regular season ==
=== Final standings ===
American Division
	GP	W	L	T	GF	GA	PTS
**Boston Bruins**	48	30	11	7	142	89	67
**New York Rangers**	48	27	15	6	149	96	60
**Chicago Black Hawks**	48	14	25	9	97	139	37
Detroit Red Wings	48	12	25	11	99	133	35

Note: GP = Games Played, W = Wins, L = Losses, T = Ties, Pts = Points, GF = Goals For, GA = Goals Against
Teams that qualified for the playoffs are highlighted in bold.

=== Record vs. opponents ===
==== Vs. American Division ====
1937–38 NHL records
Team	**BOS**	**CHI**	**DET**	**NYR**	**Total**
Boston	—	6–2	5–2–1	5–3	**16–7–1**
Chicago	2–6	—	3–4–1	3–4–1	**6–14–2**
Detroit	2–5–1	4–3–1	—	1–6–1	**7–14–3**
N.Y. Rangers	3–5	4–3–1	6–1–1	—	**13–9–2**

==== Vs. Canadian Division ====
1937–38 NHL records
Team	**MTL**	**MTM**	**NYA**	**TOR**	**Total**
Boston	2–2–2	4–0–2	3–1–2	2–2–2	**11–5–8**
Chicago	1–3–2	4–2	0–4–2	1–2–3	**6–11–7**
Detroit	3–2–1	0–3–3	2–2–2	0–4–2	**5–11–8**
N.Y. Rangers	1–3–2	5–0–1	4–1–1	4–2	**14–6–4**

== Schedule and results ==
1937–38 regular season
November

Game	Result	Date	Score	Opponent	Record
1	W	November 6, 1937	4–2	@ Montreal Maroons (1937–38)	1–0–0
2	W	November 14, 1937	3–2	New York Rangers (1937–38)	2–0–0
3	W	November 16, 1937	1–0	Montreal Maroons (1937–38)	3–0–0
4	W	November 18, 1937	2–1	@ New York Americans (1937–38)	4–0–0
5	W	November 20, 1937	3–2	@ Toronto Maple Leafs (1937–38)	5–0–0
6	W	November 21, 1937	2–1	@ Chicago Black Hawks (1937–38)	6–0–0
7	T	November 23, 1937	1–1 OT	Montreal Canadiens (1937–38)	6–0–1
8	T	November 28, 1937	3–3 OT	New York Americans (1937–38)	6–0–2

December

Game	Result	Date	Score	Opponent	Record
9	L	December 2, 1937	0–2	@ Montreal Canadiens (1937–38)	6–1–2
10	L	December 5, 1937	0–4	@ New York Rangers (1937–38)	6–2–2
11	L	December 7, 1937	2–3	Detroit Red Wings (1937–38)	6–3–2
12	W	December 14, 1937	3–1	Toronto Maple Leafs (1937–38)	7–3–2
13	W	December 18, 1937	3–1	@ Montreal Maroons (1937–38)	8–3–2
14	W	December 19, 1937	4–2	@ Detroit Red Wings (1937–38)	9–3–2
15	W	December 21, 1937	2–1	Chicago Black Hawks (1937–38)	10–3–2
16	W	December 25, 1937	1–0	@ New York Americans (1937–38)	11–3–2
17	L	December 26, 1937	1–3	New York Americans (1937–38)	11–4–2
18	W	December 28, 1937	3–2	New York Rangers (1937–38)	12–4–2
19	L	December 31, 1937	3–5	@ New York Rangers (1937–38)	12–5–2

January

Game	Result	Date	Score	Opponent	Record
20	W	January 2, 1938	4–1	@ Detroit Red Wings (1937–38)	13–5–2
21	W	January 4, 1938	6–3	Toronto Maple Leafs (1937–38)	14–5–2
22	L	January 8, 1938	2–6	@ Montreal Canadiens (1937–38)	14–6–2
23	W	January 11, 1938	6–2	Detroit Red Wings (1937–38)	15–6–2
24	W	January 16, 1938	1–0	Montreal Canadiens (1937–38)	16–6–2
25	W	January 18, 1938	5–1	Chicago Black Hawks (1937–38)	17–6–2
26	W	January 22, 1938	9–1	@ Toronto Maple Leafs (1937–38)	18–6–2
27	L	January 23, 1938	2–3	@ Chicago Black Hawks (1937–38)	18–7–2
28	L	January 25, 1938	2–3	New York Rangers (1937–38)	18–8–2
29	T	January 29, 1938	2–2 OT	@ Montreal Maroons (1937–38)	18–8–3
30	T	January 30, 1938	2–2 OT	@ Detroit Red Wings (1937–38)	18–8–4

February

Game	Result	Date	Score	Opponent	Record
31	W	February 1, 1938	2–0	Detroit Red Wings (1937–38)	19–8–4
32	L	February 5, 1938	1–3	@ Toronto Maple Leafs (1937–38)	19–9–4
33	W	February 6, 1938	7–2	@ Chicago Black Hawks (1937–38)	20–9–4
34	W	February 8, 1938	3–1	Chicago Black Hawks (1937–38)	21–9–4
35	W	February 13, 1938	1–0 OT	Montreal Canadiens (1937–38)	22–9–4
36	W	February 15, 1938	5–2	Montreal Maroons (1937–38)	23–9–4
37	W	February 17, 1938	3–2 OT	@ New York Rangers (1937–38)	24–9–4
38	W	February 20, 1938	3–2 OT	New York Rangers (1937–38)	25–9–4
39	W	February 22, 1938	2–0	Toronto Maple Leafs (1937–38)	26–9–4
40	T	February 24, 1938	1–1 OT	@ Montreal Canadiens (1937–38)	26–9–5

March

Game	Result	Date	Score	Opponent	Record
41	W	March 1, 1938	6–1	Detroit Red Wings (1937–38)	27–9–5
42	L	March 3, 1938	2–3	@ Chicago Black Hawks (1937–38)	27–10–5
43	L	March 6, 1938	3–4	@ Detroit Red Wings (1937–38)	27–11–5
44	W	March 8, 1938	7–0	New York Americans (1937–38)	28–11–5
45	T	March 10, 1938	2–2 OT	@ New York Americans (1937–38)	28–11–6
46	W	March 13, 1938	2–1	@ New York Rangers (1937–38)	29–11–6
47	T	March 15, 1938	4–4 OT	Montreal Maroons (1937–38)	29–11–7
48	W	March 20, 1938	6–1	Chicago Black Hawks (1937–38)	30–11–7

Legend: Win (2 points) Loss (0 points) Tie (1 point)

== Playoffs ==
The Boston Bruins lost the semifinals to the Toronto Maple Leafs being swept three games to none.

== Player statistics ==
=== Regular season ===
Scoring

Player	Pos	GP	G	A	Pts	PIM
Bill Cowley	C	48	17	22	39	8
Bobby Bauer	RW	48	20	14	34	9
Charlie Sands	C/RW	46	17	12	29	12
Woody Dumart	LW	48	13	14	27	6
Milt Schmidt	C/D	44	13	14	27	15
Ray Getliffe	C/LW	36	11	13	24	16
Cooney Weiland	C	48	11	12	23	16
Leroy Goldsworthy	RW	46	9	10	19	14
Gord Pettinger	C	35	7	10	17	10
Eddie Shore	D	48	3	14	17	42
Dit Clapper	RW/D	46	6	9	15	24
Flash Hollett	D	48	4	10	14	54
Art Jackson	C	48	9	3	12	24
Jack Portland	D	48	0	5	5	26
Mel Hill	RW	6	2	0	2	2
Red Hamill	LW	6	0	1	1	2
Red Beattie	LW	14	0	0	0	0
Jack Crawford	D	2	0	0	0	0
Tiny Thompson	G	48	0	0	0	0

Goaltending

Player	MIN	GP	W	L	T	GA	GAA	SO
Tiny Thompson	2970	48	30	11	7	89	1.80	7
Team:	2970	48	30	11	7	89	1.80	7

=== Playoffs ===
Scoring

Player	Pos	GP	G	A	Pts	PIM
Bill Cowley	C	3	2	0	2	0
Charlie Sands	C/RW	3	1	1	2	0
Ray Getliffe	C/LW	3	0	1	1	2
Flash Hollett	D	3	0	1	1	0
Eddie Shore	D	3	0	1	1	6
Bobby Bauer	RW	3	0	0	0	2
Dit Clapper	RW/D	3	0	0	0	12
Woody Dumart	LW	3	0	0	0	0
Leroy Goldsworthy	RW	3	0	0	0	2
Mel Hill	RW	1	0	0	0	0
Art Jackson	C	3	0	0	0	0
Gord Pettinger	C	3	0	0	0	0
Jack Portland	D	3	0	0	0	4
Milt Schmidt	C/D	3	0	0	0	0
Tiny Thompson	G	3	0	0	0	0
Cooney Weiland	C	3	0	0	0	0

Goaltending

Player	MIN	GP	W	L	GA	GAA	SO
Tiny Thompson	212	3	0	3	6	1.70	0
Team:	212	3	0	3	6	1.70	0

Note:

Pos = Position;GP = Games played; G = Goals; A = Assists; Pts = Points; PIM = Penalty minutes; +/- = Plus/minus; PPG = Power-play goals; SHG = Short-handed goals; GWG = Game-winning goals
Pos = Position;GP = Games played; Min, TOI = Minutes played; W = Wins; L = Losses; T,T/OT = Ties; OTL = Overtime losses; GA = Goals-against; GAA = Goals-against average; SO = Shutouts; SA = Shots against; SV = Shots saved;SV% = Save percentage;

== See also ==
- 1937–38 NHL season
