= 1937–38 Detroit Red Wings season =

National Hockey League team season

1937–38 Detroit Red Wings
- Division: 4th American
- 1937–38 record: 12–25–11
- Home record: 8–10–6
- Road record: 4–15–5
- Goals for: 99
- Goals against: 133

Team information
- General manager: Jack Adams
- Coach: Jack Adams
- Captain: Doug Young
- Arena: Detroit Olympia

Team leaders
- Goals: Carl Liscombe (14)
- Assists: Marty Barry (20)
- Points: Herbie Lewis (31)
- Penalty minutes: Marty Barry (34)
- Wins: Normie Smith (11)
- Goals against average: Normie Smith (2.66)

The 1937–38 Detroit Red Wings season was the 12th season for the Detroit NHL franchise, sixth as the Red Wings. The Wings finished last in the American Division and missed the playoffs for the first time since the 1934–35 season. They would not miss the playoffs again until 1958–59 season.

On May 5 and 11, 1938, the Red Wings played post-season exhibition games against the Montreal Canadiens at Earlscourt Stadium in London, England.

== Regular season ==
=== Final standings ===
American Division
	GP	W	L	T	GF	GA	PTS
**Boston Bruins**	48	30	11	7	142	89	67
**New York Rangers**	48	27	15	6	149	96	60
**Chicago Black Hawks**	48	14	25	9	97	139	37
Detroit Red Wings	48	12	25	11	99	133	35

Note: GP = Games Played, W = Wins, L = Losses, T = Ties, Pts = Points, GF = Goals For, GA = Goals Against
Teams that qualified for the playoffs are highlighted in bold.

=== Record vs. opponents ===
==== Vs. American Division ====
1937–38 NHL records
Team	**BOS**	**CHI**	**DET**	**NYR**	**Total**
Boston	—	6–2	5–2–1	5–3	**16–7–1**
Chicago	2–6	—	3–4–1	3–4–1	**6–14–2**
Detroit	2–5–1	4–3–1	—	1–6–1	**7–14–3**
N.Y. Rangers	3–5	4–3–1	6–1–1	—	**13–9–2**

==== Vs. Canadian Division ====
1937–38 NHL records
Team	**MTL**	**MTM**	**NYA**	**TOR**	**Total**
Boston	2–2–2	4–0–2	3–1–2	2–2–2	**11–5–8**
Chicago	1–3–2	4–2	0–4–2	1–2–3	**6–11–7**
Detroit	3–2–1	0–3–3	2–2–2	0–4–2	**5–11–8**
N.Y. Rangers	1–3–2	5–0–1	4–1–1	4–2	**14–6–4**

== Schedule and results ==
1937–38 regular season
November

Game	Result	Date	Score	Opponent	Record
1	T	November 4, 1937	2–2 OT	@ Toronto Maple Leafs (1937–38)	0–0–1
2	L	November 7, 1937	0–3	New York Rangers (1937–38)	0–1–1
3	L	November 13, 1937	2–5	@ Montreal Canadiens (1937–38)	0–2–1
4	W	November 14, 1937	2–1	Montreal Canadiens (1937–38)	1–2–1
5	L	November 18, 1937	1–3	@ Chicago Black Hawks (1937–38)	1–3–1
6	L	November 21, 1937	0–5	Toronto Maple Leafs (1937–38)	1–4–1
7	L	November 23, 1937	1–3	@ New York Americans (1937–38)	1–5–1
8	W	November 25, 1937	4–1	Chicago Black Hawks (1937–38)	2–5–1
9	L	November 28, 1937	1–3	Montreal Maroons (1937–38)	2–6–1

December

Game	Result	Date	Score	Opponent	Record
10	L	December 5, 1937	1–2	New York Americans (1937–38)	2–7–1
11	W	December 7, 1937	3–2	@ Boston Bruins (1937–38)	3–7–1
12	L	December 9, 1937	2–5	@ Montreal Maroons (1937–38)	3–8–1
13	L	December 12, 1937	2–5	New York Rangers (1937–38)	3–9–1
14	L	December 14, 1937	1–3	@ New York Rangers (1937–38)	3–10–1
15	L	December 16, 1937	1–3	@ Chicago Black Hawks (1937–38)	3–11–1
16	L	December 19, 1937	2–4	Boston Bruins (1937–38)	3–12–1
17	T	December 25, 1937	1–1 OT	@ Toronto Maple Leafs (1937–38)	3–12–2
18	L	December 26, 1937	1–3	Toronto Maple Leafs (1937–38)	3–13–2
19	T	December 30, 1937	2–2 OT	Chicago Black Hawks (1937–38)	3–13–3

January

Game	Result	Date	Score	Opponent	Record
20	L	January 2, 1938	1–4	Boston Bruins (1937–38)	3–14–3
21	W	January 4, 1938	3–0	@ Montreal Canadiens (1937–38)	4–14–3
22	T	January 6, 1938	1–1 OT	@ New York Americans (1937–38)	4–14–4
23	L	January 9, 1938	1–4	@ New York Rangers (1937–38)	4–15–4
24	L	January 11, 1938	2–6	@ Boston Bruins (1937–38)	4–16–4
25	T	January 13, 1938	3–3 OT	@ New York Rangers (1937–38)	4–16–5
26	T	January 15, 1938	2–2 OT	@ Montreal Maroons (1937–38)	4–16–6
27	T	January 16, 1938	1–1 OT	Montreal Maroons (1937–38)	4–16–7
28	W	January 20, 1938	4–2	Chicago Black Hawks (1937–38)	5–16–7
29	W	January 23, 1938	3–2	New York Americans (1937–38)	6–16–7
30	L	January 27, 1938	3–4	@ Chicago Black Hawks (1937–38)	6–17–7
31	L	January 29, 1938	1–4	@ Toronto Maple Leafs (1937–38)	6–18–7
32	T	January 30, 1938	2–2 OT	Boston Bruins (1937–38)	6–18–8

February

Game	Result	Date	Score	Opponent	Record
33	L	February 1, 1938	0–2	@ Boston Bruins (1937–38)	6–19–8
34	W	February 3, 1938	6–1	@ New York Americans (1937–38)	7–19–8
35	W	February 6, 1938	8–0	Montreal Canadiens (1937–38)	8–19–8
36	L	February 10, 1938	0–4	New York Rangers (1937–38)	8–20–8
37	T	February 13, 1938	2–2 OT	New York Americans (1937–38)	8–20–9
38	W	February 20, 1938	1–0	@ Chicago Black Hawks (1937–38)	9–20–9
39	T	February 24, 1938	2–2 OT	Montreal Maroons (1937–38)	9–20–10
40	T	February 27, 1938	1–1 OT	Montreal Canadiens (1937–38)	9–20–11

March

Game	Result	Date	Score	Opponent	Record
41	L	March 1, 1938	1–6	@ Boston Bruins (1937–38)	9–21–11
42	L	March 3, 1938	3–4	@ New York Rangers (1937–38)	9–22–11
43	W	March 6, 1938	4–3	Boston Bruins (1937–38)	10–22–11
44	L	March 10, 1938	2–3	@ Montreal Maroons (1937–38)	10–23–11
45	W	March 13, 1938	5–1	Chicago Black Hawks (1937–38)	11–23–11
46	L	March 15, 1938	2–3	@ Montreal Canadiens (1937–38)	11–24–11
47	L	March 17, 1938	2–7	Toronto Maple Leafs (1937–38)	11–25–11
48	W	March 20, 1938	4–3	New York Rangers (1937–38)	12–25–11

Legend: Win (2 points) Loss (0 points) Tie (1 point)

== Player statistics ==
=== Regular season ===
Scoring

Player	Pos	GP	G	A	Pts	PIM
Herbie Lewis	LW	42	13	18	31	12
Marty Barry	C	48	9	20	29	34
Syd Howe	C/LW	48	8	19	27	14
Carl Liscombe	LW	41	14	10	24	30
Alex Motter	C	32	5	17	22	6
Larry Aurie	RW	47	10	9	19	19
Hec Kilrea	LW	48	9	9	18	10
Eddie Wares	D/RW	21	9	7	16	2
Bucko McDonald	D	47	3	7	10	14
John Sorrell	LW	23	3	7	10	0
Mud Bruneteau	RW	24	3	6	9	16
Doug Young	D	48	3	5	8	24
Ron Hudson	C	32	5	2	7	2
Ebbie Goodfellow	C/D	30	0	7	7	13
Joe Lamb	RW	14	3	1	4	6
Gord Pettinger	C	12	1	3	4	4
Red Beattie	LW	11	1	2	3	0
Ralph Bowman	D	45	0	2	2	26
Pete Bessone	D	6	0	1	1	6
Ken Doraty	F	2	0	1	1	2
Clarence Drouillard	C	10	0	1	1	0
Pete Kelly	RW	9	0	1	1	2
Rolly Roulston	LW/D	2	0	1	1	0
John Doran	D	7	0	0	0	10
Jimmy Franks	G	1	0	0	0	0
Wally Kilrea	RW/C	5	0	0	0	4
Howie Mackie	RW/D	7	0	0	0	0
Jimmy Orlando	D	6	0	0	0	4
John Sherf	LW	6	0	0	0	2
Normie Smith	G	47	0	0	0	0

Goaltending

Player	MIN	GP	W	L	T	GA	GAA	SO
Normie Smith	2930	47	11	25	11	130	2.66	3
Jimmy Franks	60	1	1	0	0	3	3.00	0
Team:	2990	48	12	25	11	133	2.67	3

Note: GP = Games played; G = Goals; A = Assists; Pts = Points; +/- = Plus-minus PIM = Penalty minutes; PPG = Power-play goals; SHG = Short-handed goals; GWG = Game-winning goals;
MIN = Minutes played; W = Wins; L = Losses; T = Ties; GA = Goals against; GAA = Goals-against average; SO = Shutouts;

== European tour ==
After failing to make the playoffs, the Red Wings embarked on a tour of Europe with the Montreal Canadiens. Prior to departure, the two teams played three exhibition games in Nova Scotia. In Europe, the teams played a nine-game series in England and France. The Canadiens won the series with a record of 5–3–1

== See also ==
- 1937–38 NHL season
