= Larry Molyneaux =

Canadian ice hockey player

- Born: July 8, 1912; Sutton West, Ontario, Canada
- Died: May 24, 1966 (aged 53); Toronto, Ontario, Canada
- Height: 6 ft 0 in (183 cm)
- Weight: 214 lb (97 kg; 15 st 4 lb)
- Position: Defence
- Shot: Right
- Played for: New York Rangers
- Playing career: 1932–1941

Lawrence Samuel Molyneaux (July 8, 1912 – May 24, 1966) was a Canadian professional ice hockey player who played 45 games in the National Hockey League for the New York Rangers during the 1937–38 and 1938–39 seasons. The rest of his career, which lasted from 1932 to 1941, was spent in the minor leagues. He was born in Sutton West, Ontario. He died in 1966 in Toronto, Ontario.

== Career statistics ==
=== Regular season and playoffs ===
			Regular season					Playoffs
Season	Team	League	GP	G	A	Pts	PIM	GP	G	A	Pts	PIM
1931–32	Newmarket Redmen	OHA	7	1	1	2	6	6	3	0	3	—
1932–33	Springfield Indians	Can-Am	13	0	1	1	17	—	—	—	—	—
1932–33	Quebec Castors	Can-Am	33	2	2	4	40	—	—	—	—	—
1934–35	Quebec Castors	Can-Am	40	2	5	7	60	—	—	—	—	—
1934–35	New Haven Eagles	Can-Am	48	6	11	17	60	—	—	—	—	—
1935–36	Philadelphia Ramblers	Can-Am	48	2	10	12	54	—	—	—	—	—
1936–37	Philadelphia Ramblers	IAHL	47	2	5	7	45	6	0	0	0	2
1937–38	New York Rangers	NHL	2	0	0	0	2	3	0	0	0	8
1937–38	Philadelphia Ramblers	IAHL	47	0	8	8	46	5	0	0	0	0
1938–39	New York Rangers	NHL	43	0	1	1	18	7	0	0	0	0
1938–39	Philadelphia Ramblers	IAHL	5	0	2	2	16	—	—	—	—	—
1939–40	Cleveland Barons	IAHL	54	2	6	8	46	—	—	—	—	—
1940–41	Cleveland Barons	AHL	19	1	2	3	17	—	—	—	—	—
1940–41	Pittsburgh Hornets	AHL	15	0	3	3	4	9	0	0	0	14
IAHL/AHL totals			187	5	26	31	174	20	0	0	0	16
NHL totals			45	0	1	1	20	10	0	0	0	8
