= Charles Corrigan =

Canadian ice hockey player

- Born: May 22, 1916; Moosomin, Saskatchewan, Canada
- Died: June 23, 1988 (aged 72)
- Height: 6 ft 2 in (188 cm)
- Weight: 192 lb (87 kg; 13 st 10 lb)
- Position: Right wing
- Shot: Right
- Played for: Toronto Maple Leafs; New York Americans
- Playing career: 1935–1949

Charles Hubert Patrick Corrigan (May 22, 1916 — June 23, 1988) was a Canadian ice hockey right winger. He played 18 games in the National Hockey League for the Toronto Maple Leafs and New York Americans between 1937 and 1941. The rest of his career, which lasted from 1935 to 1949, was spent in various minor leagues. He was born in Moosomin, Saskatchewan. Chuck was the grandfather to Pat Dodson who played professional baseball for the Boston Red Sox.

== Career statistics ==
=== Regular season and playoffs ===
			Regular season					Playoffs
Season	Team	League	GP	G	A	Pts	PIM	GP	G	A	Pts	PIM
1935–36	Toronto Goodyears	OHA Sr	8	1	3	4	8	8	3	1	4	4
1936–37	Toronto Goodyears	OHA Sr	9	4	1	5	8	5	1	1	2	6
1937–38	Toronto Maple Leafs	NHL	3	0	0	0	0	—	—	—	—	—
1937–38	Syracuse Stars	IAHL	20	3	2	5	11	—	—	—	—	—
1937–38	Springfield Indians	IAHL	22	5	2	7	10	—	—	—	—	—
1938–39	Springfield Indians	IAHL	21	1	2	3	0	—	—	—	—	—
1938–39	Hershey Bears	IAHL	21	1	4	5	11	5	0	1	1	0
1939–40	Springfield Indians	IAHL	54	12	31	43	14	3	0	1	1	0
1940–41	Springfield Indians	AHL	22	3	1	4	7	3	0	1	1	0
1940–41	New York Americans	NHL	15	2	2	4	2	—	—	—	—	—
1941–42	Springfield Indians	AHL	47	7	33	40	12	—	—	—	—	—
1942–43	Pittsburgh Hornets	AHL	52	17	25	42	10	2	0	1	1	5
1943–44	Pittsburgh Hornets	AHL	3	0	2	2	2	—	—	—	—	—
1943–44	Kingston Army	OHA Sr	13	8	7	15	10	—	—	—	—	—
1943–44	Montreal RCAF	MNDHL	1	0	0	0	0	1	0	0	0	0
1945–46	Toronto People's Credit	TIHL	2	1	0	1	4	—	—	—	—	—
1945–46	Fort Worth Rangers	USHL	6	2	2	4	6	—	—	—	—	—
1945–46	St. Paul Saints	USHL	23	6	5	11	8	3	0	0	0	0
1946–47	Toronto People's Credit	TIHL	21	4	13	17	8	5	2	0	2	0
1947–48	Fresno Falcons	PCHL	65	36	37	73	24	9	4	4	8	16
1948–49	Fresno Falcons	PCHL	16	5	12	17	2	2	0	0	0	2
IAHL/AHL totals			262	49	102	151	77	13	0	4	4	5
NHL totals			18	2	2	4	2	—	—	—	—	—
