= Earl Robertson =

Canadian ice hockey player

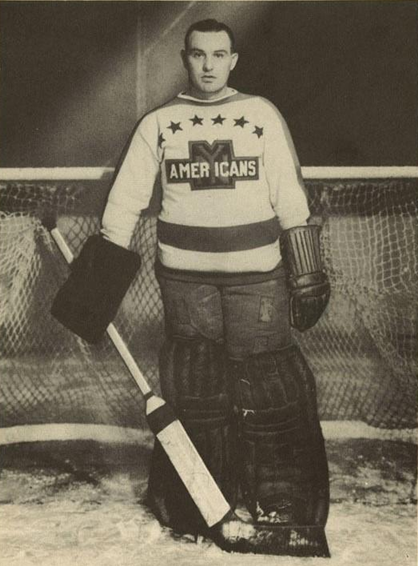
- Robertson with the New York Americans in 1939
- Born: November 24, 1910 Bengough, Saskatchewan, Canada
- Died: January 19, 1979 (aged 68) Wetaskiwin, Alberta, Canada
- Height: 5 ft 10 in (178 cm)
- Weight: 165 lb (75 kg; 11 st 11 lb)
- Position: Goaltender
- Caught: Left
- Played for: Detroit Red Wings; New York Americans
- Playing career: 1928–1944

Earl Cooper "Robbie" Robertson (November 24, 1910 – January 19, 1979) was a Canadian professional ice hockey goaltender who played 190 games in the National Hockey League.

== Early life ==
Robertson was born in Bengough, Saskatchewan. He played junior hockey with the Regina Falcons.

== Career ==
During his career, Robertson played with the Detroit Red Wings (1936–37 season) and New York Americans/Brooklyn Americans (1937–38 season to 1941–42 season).

During the 1937 Stanley Cup playoffs, Detroit's regular goaltender Normie Smith was injured. Robertson was called on play six games in the playoffs. Robertson was in net the day Detroit Red Wings won their second Stanley Cup in 1937, and his name is engraved on cup as a result of this win. During World War II, he served with the 19th Alberta Dragoons.

== Career statistics ==
=== Regular season and playoffs ===
			Regular season								Playoffs
Season	Team	League	GP	W	L	T	Min	GA	SO	GAA	GP	W	L	T	Min	GA	SO	GAA
1925–26	Regina Falcons	S-SJHL	8	4	3	1	500	22	0	2.64	2	0	2	0	120	9	0	4.50
1926–27	Regina Falcons	S-SJHL	6	4	2	0	370	11	0	1.76	1	0	1	0	60	3	0	3.00
1927–28	Vancouver Monarchs	VCAHL	8	4	2	2	500	18	0	2.16	—	—	—	—	—	—	—	—
1927–28	Vancouver Monarchs	Al-Cup	—	—	—	—	—	—	—	—	4	1	2	1	240	11	0	2.75
1928–29	Victoria Cubs	PCHL	34	7	21	6	2130	86	1	2.42	—	—	—	—	—	—	—	—
1929–30	Victoria Cubs	PCHL	32	—	—	—	1920	112	1	3.50	—	—	—	—	—	—	—	—
1930–31	Tacoma Tigers	PCHL	10	—	—	—	600	24	2	2.40	—	—	—	—	—	—	—	—
1930–31	Oakland Sheiks	Cal-Pro	1	1	0	0	60	0	1	0.00	—	—	—	—	—	—	—	—
1931–32	Hollywood Stars	Cal-Pro	31	20	7	4	1860	86	—	2.77	7	4	3	0	420	20	1	2.86
1932–33	Edmonton Eskimos	WCHL	27	—	—	—	1620	73	6	2.70	8	—	—	—	480	15	1	1.88
1933–34	Edmonton Eskimos	NWHL	33	—	—	—	1960	89	4	2.70	2	0	2	—	120	7	0	3.50
1934–35	Windsor Bulldogs	IHL	40	14	19	7	2490	100	6	2.41	—	—	—	—	—	—	—	—
1935–36	Rochester Cardinals	IHL	2	0	2	0	120	7	0	3.50	—	—	—	—	—	—	—	—
1935–36	Windsor Bulldogs	IHL	48	18	19	11	2998	120	4	2.40	8	3	4	1	505	18	2	2.14
1936–37	Pittsburgh Hornets	IAHL	29	14	15	0	1820	74	5	2.44	4	1	3	—	240	12	0	3.00
1936–37	Detroit Red Wings	NHL	—	—	—	—	—	—	—	—	6	3	2	—	340	8	2	1.41
1937–38	New York Americans	NHL	48	19	18	11	3000	111	6	2.22	6	3	3	—	475	12	0	1.52
1938–39	New York Americans	NHL	46	17	18	10	2850	136	3	2.86	—	—	—	—	—	—	—	—
1939–40	New York Americans	NHL	48	15	29	4	2960	140	6	2.84	3	1	2	—	180	9	0	3.00
1940–41	New York Americans	NHL	36	6	22	8	2260	142	1	3.77	—	—	—	—	—	—	—	—
1940–41	Springfield Indians	AHL	11	4	5	2	680	37	0	3.26	3	1	2	—	236	5	0	1.27
1941–42	Brooklyn Americans	NHL	12	3	8	1	750	46	0	3.68	—	—	—	—	—	—	—	—
1941–42	Springfield Indians	AHL	41	24	14	3	2460	125	2	3.05	3	2	1	—	160	15	0	5.63
1943–44	Edmonton Vics	X-Games	—	—	—	—	—	—	—	—	—	—	—	—	—	—	—	—
1943–44	Edmonton Vics	Al-Cup	—	—	—	—	—	—	—	—	3	0	3	0	180	26	0	8.67
NHL totals			190	60	95	34	11,820	575	16	2.92	15	7	7	—	995	29	2	1.75
