= Jimmy Fowler =

Canadian ice hockey player (1915–1985)

- Born: April 6, 1915 Toronto, Ontario, Canada
- Died: October 17, 1985 (aged 70)
- Height: 5 ft 11 in (180 cm)
- Weight: 168 lb (76 kg; 12 st 0 lb)
- Position: Defence
- Shot: Left
- Played for: Toronto Maple Leafs
- Playing career: 1933–1939

James William Fowler (April 6, 1915 – October 17, 1985) was a professional ice hockey player who played 135 games in the National Hockey League with the Toronto Maple Leafs between 1936 and 1939. He also played several years in minor leagues during his career, which lasted from 1933 to 1939. Fowler was born in Toronto, Ontario.

== Career statistics ==
=== Regular season and playoffs ===
			Regular season					Playoffs
Season	Team	League	GP	G	A	Pts	PIM	GP	G	A	Pts	PIM
1932–33	West Toronto Nationals	OHA	9	4	2	6	0	5	0	0	0	2
1932–33	West Toronto Nationals	M-Cup	—	—	—	—	—	6	1	0	1	0
1933–34	Toronto Young Rangers	OHA	11	9	7	16	10	1	1	0	1	0
1933–34	Toronto City Services	TMHL	7	1	2	3	2	9	6	7	13	12
1933–34	Toronto Young Rangers	M-Cup	—	—	—	—	—	2	0	1	1	4
1934–35	Toronto City Services	TIHL	11	3	3	6	4	7	2	6	8	8
1934–35	Toronto All-Stars	OHA Sr	10	4	0	4	4	6	2	2	4	4
1935–36	Syracuse Stars	IHL	45	10	15	25	23	3	1	0	1	0
1936–37	Toronto Maple Leafs	NHL	48	7	11	18	22	2	0	0	0	0
1937–38	Toronto Maple Leafs	NHL	48	10	12	22	8	7	0	2	2	0
1938–39	Toronto Maple Leafs	NHL	39	1	6	7	9	9	0	1	1	2
1938–39	Syracuse Stars	IAHL	7	3	1	4	0	—	—	—	—	—
NHL totals			135	18	29	47	39	18	0	3	3	2
