= Pep Kelly =

Canadian ice hockey player

- Born: January 9, 1914; North Bay, Ontario, Canada
- Died: August 22, 1990 (aged 76)
- Height: 5 ft 7 in (170 cm)
- Weight: 161 lb (73 kg; 11 st 7 lb)
- Position: Right Wing
- Shot: Right
- Played for: Brooklyn Americans; Chicago Black Hawks; Toronto Maple Leafs
- Playing career: 1934–1943

Matthias James Regis "Pep" Kelly (January 9, 1914 in North Bay, Ontario — August 22, 1990) was a professional ice hockey player who played 288 games in the National Hockey League with the Toronto Maple Leafs, Chicago Black Hawks, and Brooklyn Americans between 1934 and 1942.

== Career statistics ==
=== Regular season and playoffs ===
			Regular season					Playoffs
Season	Team	League	GP	G	A	Pts	PIM	GP	G	A	Pts	PIM
1930–31	North Bay Trappers	NOJHA	—	—	—	—	—	—	—	—	—	—
1931–32	North Bay Trappers	NOJHA	—	—	—	—	—	—	—	—	—	—
1932–33	Newmarket Redmen	OHA	17	14	5	19	—	—	—	—	—	—
1932–33	Newmarket Redmen	M-Cup	—	—	—	—	—	19	13	3	16	16
1933–34	Toronto St. Michael's Majors	OHA	11	13	8	21	12	3	3	1	4	15
1933–34	Toronto St. Michael's Majors	M-Cup	—	—	—	—	—	13	20	8	28	8
1934–35	Toronto Maple Leafs	NHL	47	11	8	19	14	7	2	0	2	4
1934–35	Syracuse Stars	IHL	1	0	0	0	0	—	—	—	—	—
1935–36	Toronto Maple Leafs	NHL	42	11	8	19	24	9	2	3	5	4
1936–37	Toronto Maple Leafs	NHL	16	2	0	2	8	—	—	—	—	—
1936–37	Chicago Black Hawks	NHL	29	13	4	17	0	—	—	—	—	—
1937–38	Toronto Maple Leafs	NHL	43	9	10	19	25	7	2	2	4	2
1938–39	Toronto Maple Leafs	NHL	48	11	11	22	12	9	1	0	1	0
1939–40	Toronto Maple Leafs	NHL	34	11	9	20	15	6	0	1	1	0
1940–41	Chicago Black Hawks	NHL	21	5	3	8	7	—	—	—	—	—
1940–41	Providence Reds	AHL	16	5	7	12	0	—	—	—	—	—
1941–42	Brooklyn Americans	NHL	8	1	0	1	0	—	—	—	—	—
1941–42	Springfield Indians	AHL	18	9	10	19	8	—	—	—	—	—
1941–42	Buffalo Bisons	AHL	34	8	14	22	12	—	—	—	—	—
1942–43	Pittsburgh Hornets	AHL	52	12	12	24	6	2	0	2	2	0
1943–44	Sudbury Open Pit Miners	NBHL	6	3	1	4	2	—	—	—	—	—
1943–44	Sudbury Open Pit Miners	Al-cup	—	—	—	—	—	15	6	5	11	8
1944–45	Sudbury Open Pit Miners	NBHL	4	5	2	7	0	4	1	1	2	2
1944–45	Powassan Hawks	NBDHL	—	7	3	10	—	—	—	—	—	—
1945–46	North Bay Shamrocks	NBHL	—	—	—	—	—	—	—	—	—	—
1946–47	North Bay Holy Names	NBHL	—	—	—	—	—	—	—	—	—	—
1947–48	North Bay Black Hawks	NBHL	14	8	14	22	—	6	4	6	10	—
1947–48	North Bay Black Hawks	Al-Cup	—	—	—	—	—	3	0	1	1	2
1948–49	North Bay Black Hawks	NBHL	13	7	4	11	4	6	6	4	10	2
1948–49	North Bay Black Hawks	Al-Cup	—	—	—	—	—	11	3	5	8	0
NHL totals			288	74	53	127	105	38	7	6	13	10
