= Tommy Anderson (ice hockey) =

Canadian ice hockey player (1910–1971)

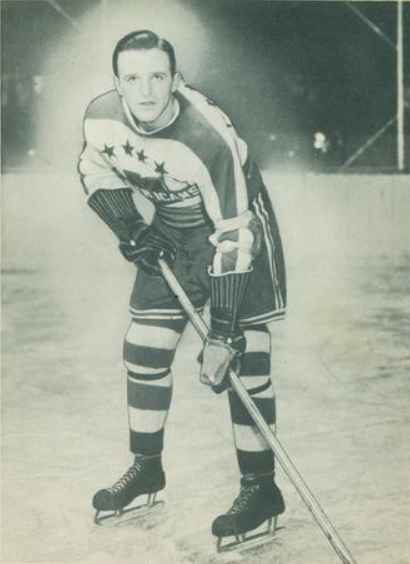
- Anderson with the New York Americans in 1939
- Born: July 9, 1910 Edinburgh, Scotland
- Died: September 15, 1971 (aged 61) Sylvan Lake, Alberta, Canada
- Height: 5 ft 10 in (178 cm)
- Weight: 175 lb (79 kg; 12 st 7 lb)
- Position: Defence/Left Wing
- Shot: Left
- Played for: New York Americans; Detroit Red Wings
- Playing career: 1930–1951

Thomas Linton "Cowboy" Anderson (July 9, 1910 – September 15, 1971) was a Canadian professional ice hockey defenceman who played eight seasons in the National Hockey League between 1934 and 1942 for the Detroit Red Wings and the New York/Brooklyn Americans. He was born in Edinburgh, Scotland and raised in Drumheller, Alberta and spent his final years in Sylvan Lake, Alberta.

== Playing career ==
Anderson played in the National Hockey League (NHL) from 1934 to 1942. He played his first season for the Detroit Red Wings and his last seven for the New York/Brooklyn Americans.

For the 1941–42 season, Anderson switched positions from left wing to defence. The Americans finished last in the NHL, but Anderson had 41 points to set the league record for a defenceman. He also won the 1942 Hart Trophy as the NHL's most valuable player, becoming the first player to win the award while on a team that missed the playoffs. That was Anderson's last season in the NHL as he enlisted in the Canadian military at the onset of World War II.

He was the last Hart Trophy winner to play for a non-Original Six team until 1973, when Bobby Clarke of the Philadelphia Flyers won the award. Anderson, José Théodore, and Al Rollins are the only winners of the Hart Trophy who have not been selected to the Hockey Hall of Fame, and the only skater of the four.

== Career statistics ==
=== Regular season and playoffs ===
			Regular season					Playoffs
Season	Team	League	GP	G	A	Pts	PIM	GP	G	A	Pts	PIM
1929–30	Drumheller Miners	ASHL	16	6	3	9	18	2	0	0	0	0
1930–31	Philadelphia Arrows	Can-Am	38	7	8	15	89	—	—	—	—	—
1931–32	Philadelphia Arrows	Can-Am	26	5	6	11	36	—	—	—	—	—
1932–33	Philadelphia Arrows	Can-Am	45	11	24	35	49	5	2	4	6	5
1933–34	Philadelphia Arrows	Can-Am	40	20	25	45	46	2	0	2	2	4
1934–35	Detroit Red Wings	NHL	27	5	2	7	16	—	—	—	—	—
1934–35	Detroit Olympics	IHL	20	6	9	15	32	5	0	1	1	2
1935–36	New York Americans	NHL	24	3	2	5	20	5	0	0	0	6
1936–37	New York Americans	NHL	45	10	15	25	24	—	—	—	—	—
1936–37	Cleveland Barons	IAHL	4	1	1	2	17	—	—	—	—	—
1937–38	New York Americans	NHL	45	4	21	25	22	6	1	4	5	2
1937–38	New Haven Eagles	IAHL	6	0	0	0	15	—	—	—	—	—
1938–39	New York Americans	NHL	47	13	27	40	14	2	0	0	0	0
1939–40	New York Americans	NHL	48	12	19	31	22	3	1	3	4	0
1940–41	New York Americans	NHL	35	3	12	15	8	—	—	—	—	—
1941–42	Brooklyn Americans	NHL	48	12	29	41	54	—	—	—	—	—
1942–43	Calgary Currie Army	CNDHL	16	5	11	16	26	5	0	4	4	6
1942–43	Calgary Currie Army	Al-Cup	—	—	—	—	—	5	0	2	2	10
1943–44	Calgary Currie Army	CNDHL	16	2	6	8	21	2	0	2	2	2
1944–45	Calgary Currie Army	CNDHL	11	1	3	4	32	3	0	0	0	8
1945–46	Providence Reds	AHL	47	3	17	20	12	—	—	—	—	—
1946–47	Hollywood Wolves	PCHL	60	9	22	31	42	—	—	—	—	—
NHL totals			319	62	127	189	180	16	2	7	9	8

== See also ==
- List of National Hockey League players born in the United Kingdom

Preceded by Charlie Conacher	Brooklyn Americans captain 1941–42	Succeeded by Position abolished
Preceded by Bill Cowley	Winner of the Hart Trophy; 1942	Succeeded by Bill Cowley
