= Paul Haynes (ice hockey) =

Canadian ice hockey player

- Born: March 1, 1910 Montreal, Quebec, Canada
- Died: May 12, 1989 (aged 79)
- Height: 5 ft 10 in (178 cm)
- Weight: 160 lb (73 kg; 11 st 6 lb)
- Position: Centre
- Shot: Left
- Played for: Montreal Maroons; Boston Bruins; Montreal Canadiens
- Playing career: 1930–1941

William Paul Joseph Haynes (March 1, 1910 in Montreal, Quebec – May 12, 1989) was a Canadian ice hockey forward. He played in the National Hockey League (NHL) for the Montreal Maroons, Boston Bruins, and Montreal Canadiens between 1930 and 1941.

== Career ==
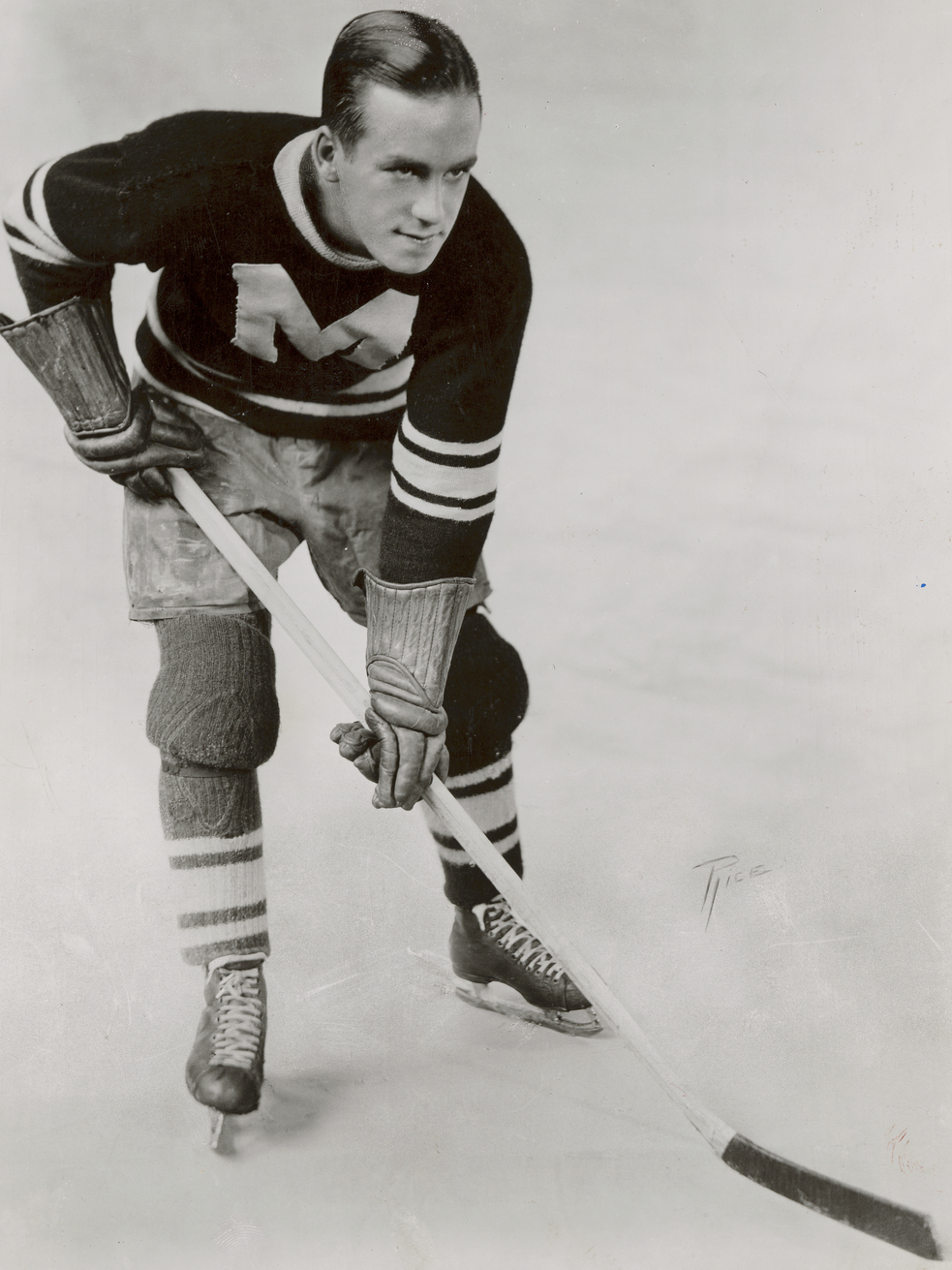

Haynes started his National Hockey League career with the Montreal Maroons. He would also play with the Boston Bruins and Montreal Canadiens. His career lasted from 1931 to 1941. He discovered future stars Elmer Lach and Ken Reardon for the Canadiens after getting injured and being sent on a scouting tour of the West. His career ended when he was cut by Canadiens coach Dick Irvin for skipping practice in New York to attend the opera.

== Career statistics ==
=== Regular season and playoffs ===
			Regular season					Playoffs
Season	Team	League	GP	G	A	Pts	PIM	GP	G	A	Pts	PIM
1929–30	Montreal AAA	MCHL	10	2	1	3	4	2	0	0	0	0
1929–30	Montreal AAA	Al-Cup	—	—	—	—	—	9	2	3	5	10
1930–31	Montreal Maroons	NHL	19	1	0	1	0	—	—	—	—	—
1930–31	Windsor Bulldogs	IHL	27	11	16	27	16	6	4	6	10	2
1931–32	Montreal Maroons	NHL	12	1	0	1	0	4	0	0	0	0
1931–32	Windsor Bulldogs	IHL	33	10	14	24	6	—	—	—	—	—
1932–33	Montreal Maroons	NHL	48	16	25	41	18	2	0	0	0	2
1933–34	Montreal Maroons	NHL	44	5	4	9	18	4	0	1	1	2
1933–34	Windsor Bulldogs	IHL	4	0	0	0	0	—	—	—	—	—
1934–35	Montreal Maroons	NHL	11	1	2	3	0	—	—	—	—	—
1934–35	Boston Bruins	NHL	37	4	3	7	8	3	0	0	0	0
1935–36	Montreal Canadiens	NHL	48	5	19	24	24	—	—	—	—	—
1936–37	Montreal Canadiens	NHL	47	8	18	26	24	5	2	3	5	0
1937–38	Montreal Canadiens	NHL	48	13	22	35	25	3	0	4	4	5
1938–39	Montreal Canadiens	NHL	47	5	33	38	27	3	0	0	0	4
1939–40	Montreal Canadiens	NHL	23	2	8	10	8	—	—	—	—	—
1940–41	Montreal Canadiens	NHL	7	0	0	0	12	—	—	—	—	—
1940–41	New Haven Eagles	AHL	31	3	11	14	4	2	0	0	0	0
NHL totals			391	61	134	195	164	24	2	8	10	13
