= 1937–38 New York Rangers season =

NHL hockey team season

1937–38 New York Rangers
- Division: 2nd American
- 1937–38 record: 27–15–6
- Home record: 14–6–4
- Road record: 13–9–2
- Goals for: 149
- Goals against: 96

Team information
- General manager: Lester Patrick
- Coach: Lester Patrick
- Captain: Art Coulter
- Arena: Madison Square Garden

Team leaders
- Goals: Cecil Dillon (21)
- Assists: Phil Watson (25)
- Points: Cecil Dillon (39)
- Penalty minutes: Art Coulter (90)
- Wins: Dave Kerr (27)
- Goals against average: Dave Kerr (1.95)

The 1937–38 New York Rangers season was the franchise's 12th season. New York finished second in the American Division in regular season with a record of 27–15–6, and qualified for the playoffs. In the league semi-finals, the Rangers lost to the New York Americans 2–1 in a best of three games series.

== Offseason ==
The team played an exhibition game against the New York Americans in Saskatoon, Saskatchewan 30 October to open the new Saskatoon Arena.

== Regular season ==
=== Final standings ===
American Division
	GP	W	L	T	GF	GA	PTS
**Boston Bruins**	48	30	11	7	142	89	67
**New York Rangers**	48	27	15	6	149	96	60
**Chicago Black Hawks**	48	14	25	9	97	139	37
Detroit Red Wings	48	12	25	11	99	133	35

Note: GP = Games Played, W = Wins, L = Losses, T = Ties, Pts = Points, GF = Goals For, GA = Goals Against
Teams that qualified for the playoffs are highlighted in bold.

=== Record vs. opponents ===
==== Vs. American Division ====
1937–38 NHL records
Team	**BOS**	**CHI**	**DET**	**NYR**	**Total**
Boston	—	6–2	5–2–1	5–3	**16–7–1**
Chicago	2–6	—	3–4–1	3–4–1	**6–14–2**
Detroit	2–5–1	4–3–1	—	1–6–1	**7–14–3**
N.Y. Rangers	3–5	4–3–1	6–1–1	—	**13–9–2**

==== Vs. Canadian Division ====
1937–38 NHL records
Team	**MTL**	**MTM**	**NYA**	**TOR**	**Total**
Boston	2–2–2	4–0–2	3–1–2	2–2–2	**11–5–8**
Chicago	1–3–2	4–2	0–4–2	1–2–3	**6–11–7**
Detroit	3–2–1	0–3–3	2–2–2	0–4–2	**5–11–8**
N.Y. Rangers	1–3–2	5–0–1	4–1–1	4–2	**14–6–4**

== Schedule and results ==
1937–38 regular season
November: 3–4–1 (home: 1–2–1; road: 2–2–0)

Game	November	Opponent	Score	Record
1	7	@ Detroit Red Wings	3–0	1–0–0
2	11	Chicago Black Hawks	3–1	1–1–0
3	14	@ Boston Bruins	3–2	1–2–0
4	16	New York Americans	1–0	2–2–0
5	20	@ Montreal Maroons	3–0	3–2–0
6	21	Montreal Maroons	3 – 3 OT	3–2–1
7	25	Toronto Maple Leafs	3–1	3–3–1
8	27	@ Montreal Canadiens	2–1	3–4–1

December: 7–3–1 (home: 3–1–1; road: 4–2–0)

Game	December	Opponent	Score	Record
9	2	@ Chicago Black Hawks	2–1	3–5–1
10	5	Boston Bruins	4–0	4–5–1
11	11	@ Toronto Maple Leafs	6–3	5–5–1
12	12	@ Detroit Red Wings	5–2	6–5–1
13	14	Detroit Red Wings	3–1	7–5–1
14	16	@ New York Americans	2–0	8–5–1
15	19	Montreal Canadiens	2 – 2 OT	8–5–2
16	23	@ Montreal Maroons	4–0	9–5–2
17	26	Chicago Black Hawks	3–1	9–6–2
18	28	@ Boston Bruins	3–2	9–7–2
19	31	Boston Bruins	5–3	10–7–2

January: 6–2–3 (home: 3–0–2; road: 3–2–1)

Game	January	Opponent	Score	Record
20	4	New York Americans	5 – 5 OT	10–7–3
21	6	@ Chicago Black Hawks	4–1	11–7–3
22	8	@ Toronto Maple Leafs	3–2	11–8–3
23	9	Detroit Red Wings	4–1	12–8–3
24	13	Detroit Red Wings	3 – 3 OT	12–8–4
25	16	@ New York Americans	4–0	13–8–4
26	18	Montreal Canadiens	3 – 1 OT	14–8–4
27	23	Montreal Maroons	8–2	15–8–4
28	25	@ Boston Bruins	3–2	16–8–4
29	27	@ Montreal Canadiens	4–2	16–9–4
30	30	@ Chicago Black Hawks	2 – 2 OT	16–9–5

February: 8–3–0 (home: 4–2–0; road: 4–1–0)

Game	February	Opponent	Score	Record
31	1	Chicago Black Hawks	6–1	17–9–5
32	6	Toronto Maple Leafs	2–1	18–9–5
33	10	@ Detroit Red Wings	4–0	19–9–5
34	12	@ Montreal Maroons	5–3	20–9–5
35	13	Montreal Maroons	4–1	21–9–5
36	17	Boston Bruins	3 – 2 OT	21–10–5
37	20	@ Boston Bruins	3 – 2 OT	21–11–5
38	22	Montreal Canadiens	2–1	21–12–5
39	24	Chicago Black Hawks	6–3	22–12–5
40	26	@ Toronto Maple Leafs	4–2	23–12–5
41	27	@ Chicago Black Hawks	4–1	24–12–5

March: 3–3–1 (home: 3–1–0; road: 0–2–1)

Game	March	Opponent	Score	Record
42	3	Detroit Red Wings	4–3	25–12–5
43	6	@ New York Americans	3–1	25–13–5
44	8	Toronto Maple Leafs	4–3	26–13–5
45	13	Boston Bruins	2–1	26–14–5
46	17	New York Americans	5–3	27–14–5
47	19	@ Montreal Canadiens	1 – 1 OT	27–14–6
48	20	@ Detroit Red Wings	4–3	27–15–6

Legend: Win (2 points) Loss (0 points) Tie (1 point)

== Playoffs ==
1938 Stanley Cup playoffs
Quarterfinals vs. (C2) New York Americans – Americans win 2–1

Game	Date	Visitor	Score	Home	OT	Series
1	March 22	New York Americans	2–1	New York Rangers	OT	New York Americans lead series 1–0
2	March 24	New York Rangers	4–3	New York Americans		Series tied 1–1
3	March 27	New York Americans	3–2	New York Rangers	OT	New York Americans win series 2–1

Legend: Win Loss

== Player statistics ==
Skaters

Regular season
Player	GP	G	A	Pts	PIM
Cecil Dillon	48	21	18	39	6
Clint Smith	48	14	23	37	0
Neil Colville	45	17	19	36	11
Alex Shibicky	48	17	18	35	26
Lynn Patrick	48	15	19	34	24
Phil Watson	48	7	25	32	52
Mac Colville	48	14	14	28	18
Bryan Hextall	48	17	4	21	6
Walter Pratt	47	5	14	19	56
Melville Keeling	39	8	9	17	12
Ehrhardt Heller	48	2	14	16	68
Arthur Coulter	43	5	10	15	90
Bobby Kirk	39	4	8	12	14
Joe Cooper	46	3	2	5	56
Murray Patrick	1	0	2	2	0
Frank Boucher	9	0	1	1	2
Wilbert Hiller	9	0	1	1	2
Larry Molyneaux	2	0	0	0	2

Playoffs
Player	GP	G	A	Pts	PIM
Bryan Hextall	3	2	0	2	0
Mac Colville	3	0	2	2	0
Phil Watson	3	0	2	2	0
Alex Shibicky	3	2	0	2	2
Clint Smith	3	2	0	2	0
Ehrhardt Heller	3	0	1	1	2
Melville Keeling	3	0	1	1	2
Lynn Patrick	3	0	1	1	2
Neil Colville	3	0	1	1	0
Cecil Dillon	3	1	0	1	0
Larry Molyneaux	3	0	0	0	8
Wilbert Hiller	1	0	0	0	0
Murray Patrick	3	0	0	0	2
Joe Cooper	3	0	0	0	4
Walter Pratt	2	0	0	0	2

Goaltenders

Regular season
Player	GP	TOI	W	L	T	GA	GAA	SO
Dave Kerr	48	2960	27	15	6	96	1.95	8

Playoffs
Player	GP	TOI	W	L	GA	GAA	SO
Dave Kerr	3	262	1	2	8	1.83	0

^{†}Denotes player spent time with another team before joining Rangers. Stats reflect time with Rangers only.
^{‡}Traded mid-season. Stats reflect time with Rangers only.

Note:

Pos = Position;GP = Games played; G = Goals; A = Assists; Pts = Points; PIM = Penalty minutes; +/- = Plus/minus; PPG = Power-play goals; SHG = Short-handed goals; GWG = Game-winning goals
Pos = Position;GP = Games played; Min, TOI = Minutes played; W = Wins; L = Losses; T,T/OT = Ties; OTL = Overtime losses; GA = Goals-against; GAA = Goals-against average; SO = Shutouts; SA = Shots against; SV = Shots saved;SV% = Save percentage;

== See also ==
- 1937–38 NHL season
