= Normie Smith =

Canadian ice hockey player

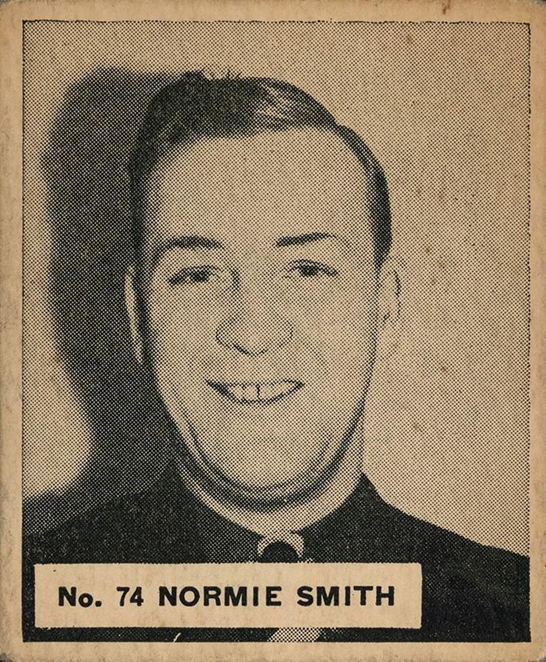
- Smith in 1937
- Born: March 18, 1908 Toronto, Ontario, Canada
- Died: February 2, 1988 (aged 79) Stuart, Florida, U.S.
- Height: 5 ft 7 in (170 cm)
- Weight: 165 lb (75 kg; 11 st 11 lb)
- Position: Goaltender
- Caught: Left
- Played for: Detroit Red Wings; Montreal Maroons
- Playing career: 1931–1945

Norman Eugene Smith (March 18, 1908 – February 2, 1988) was a Canadian professional ice hockey goaltender who played for the Montreal Maroons and the Detroit Red Wings in the National Hockey League (NHL).

== Rookie career ==
Smith enjoyed much success in his rookie years with the Montreal Maroons. He was playing his 20th game for the Maroons in 1930–31 when Howie Morenz was sent flying into the Maroons net and knocked off Smith, who was so badly injured that he was out for the rest of the season. Smith spent the next two seasons in the minors working on his rebound-control and all-around game. It was there in the minors that Smith started wearing his distinctive cap to stop the glare of the overhead lights from blinding him.

== NHL career ==
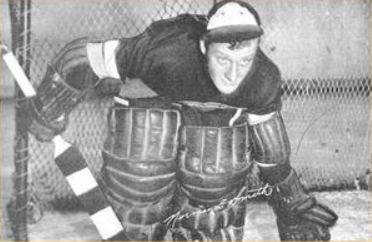
1930s photo of Smith, goaltender for Detroit Red Wings

In 1934, Smith was signed by the Detroit Red Wings. There, Smith played one of the most remarkable games ever in NHL history. He shut-out the Montreal Maroons in the NHL's longest game where he apparently lost 12 pounds (5.4 kg) of body weight during the 176-minute, 30-second affair on the way to a Stanley Cup championship in 1935–36. His 92 saves in that same game are also an NHL record. Smith helped Detroit repeat as Stanley Cup Champions in 1936–37 and won the Vezina Trophy that same year. After suffering an arm injury, he slumped in 1937–38 and the Red Wings finished last. During a game in 1938–39, he did not show up, causing a rift with coach Jack Adams. He was then traded to Boston along with $15,000 U.S. cash on November 16, 1938, for Tiny Thompson, where there was no way he would beat out Frank Brimsek, and he was sent to the minors. Normie Smith retired rather than report to the minor leagues. He returned to play briefly with the Red Wings when World War II left a vacuum of players in the NHL.

== Awards and achievements ==
- Vezina Trophy (1937).
- NHL First All-Star Team goalie (1937).
- Stanley Cup Championship (1936, 1937).
- Holds NHL record for most saves in a game (92).

== Career statistics ==
=== Regular season and playoffs ===
			Regular season								Playoffs
Season	Team	League	GP	W	L	T	Min	GA	SO	GAA	GP	W	L	T	Min	GA	SO	GAA
1929–30	Toronto Willys	TMHL	9	3	4	2	560	19	1	2.04	—	—	—	—	—	—	—	—
1930–31	Windsor Bulldogs	IHL	7	5	1	1	430	16	1	2.23	6	4	1	1	390	11	0	1.69
1931–32	Montreal Maroons	NHL	21	5	12	4	1267	62	0	2.94	—	—	—	—	—	—	—	—
1931–32	Windsor Bulldogs	IHL	14	7	3	4	890	36	3	2.43	6	1	3	2	380	8	3	1.11
1932–33	Windsor Bulldogs	IHL	42	14	22	6	2520	120	2	2.86	6	2	4	0	360	18	0	3.00
1933–34	Quebec Castors	Can-Am	32	12	12	8	2009	64	3	1.91	—	—	—	—	—	—	—	—
1934–35	Detroit Red Wings	NHL	25	12	11	2	1550	52	2	2.01	—	—	—	—	—	—	—	—
1934–35	Detroit Olympics	IHL	26	15	7	4	1630	53	4	1.95	5	5	0	0	300	5	0	1.00
1934–35	Windsor Bulldogs	IHL	1	1	0	0	60	3	0	3.00	2	0	2	2	130	9	0	4.15
1935–36	Detroit Red Wings	NHL	48	24	16	8	3030	103	6	2.04	7	6	1	0	538	12	2	1.34
1936–37	Detroit Red Wings	NHL	48	25	14	9	2980	102	6	2.05	5	3	1	1	282	6	1	1.28
1937–38	Detroit Red Wings	NHL	47	11	25	11	2930	130	3	2.66	—	—	—	—	—	—	—	—
1938–39	Detroit Red Wings	NHL	4	0	4	0	240	12	0	3.00	—	—	—	—	—	—	—	—
1938–39	Pittsburgh Hornets	IAHL	1	0	1	0	60	5	0	5.00	—	—	—	—	—	—	—	—
1943–44	Detroit Red Wings	NHL	5	3	1	1	300	15	0	3.00	—	—	—	—	—	—	—	—
1944–45	Detroit Red Wings	NHL	1	1	0	0	60	3	0	3.00	—	—	—	—	—	—	—	—
NHL totals			199	81	83	35	12,357	479	17	2.33	12	9	2	1	820	18	3	1.32

Preceded by Tiny Thompson	Winner of the Vezina Trophy; 1937	Succeeded by Tiny Thompson
