= Cliff Goupille =

Canadian ice hockey player

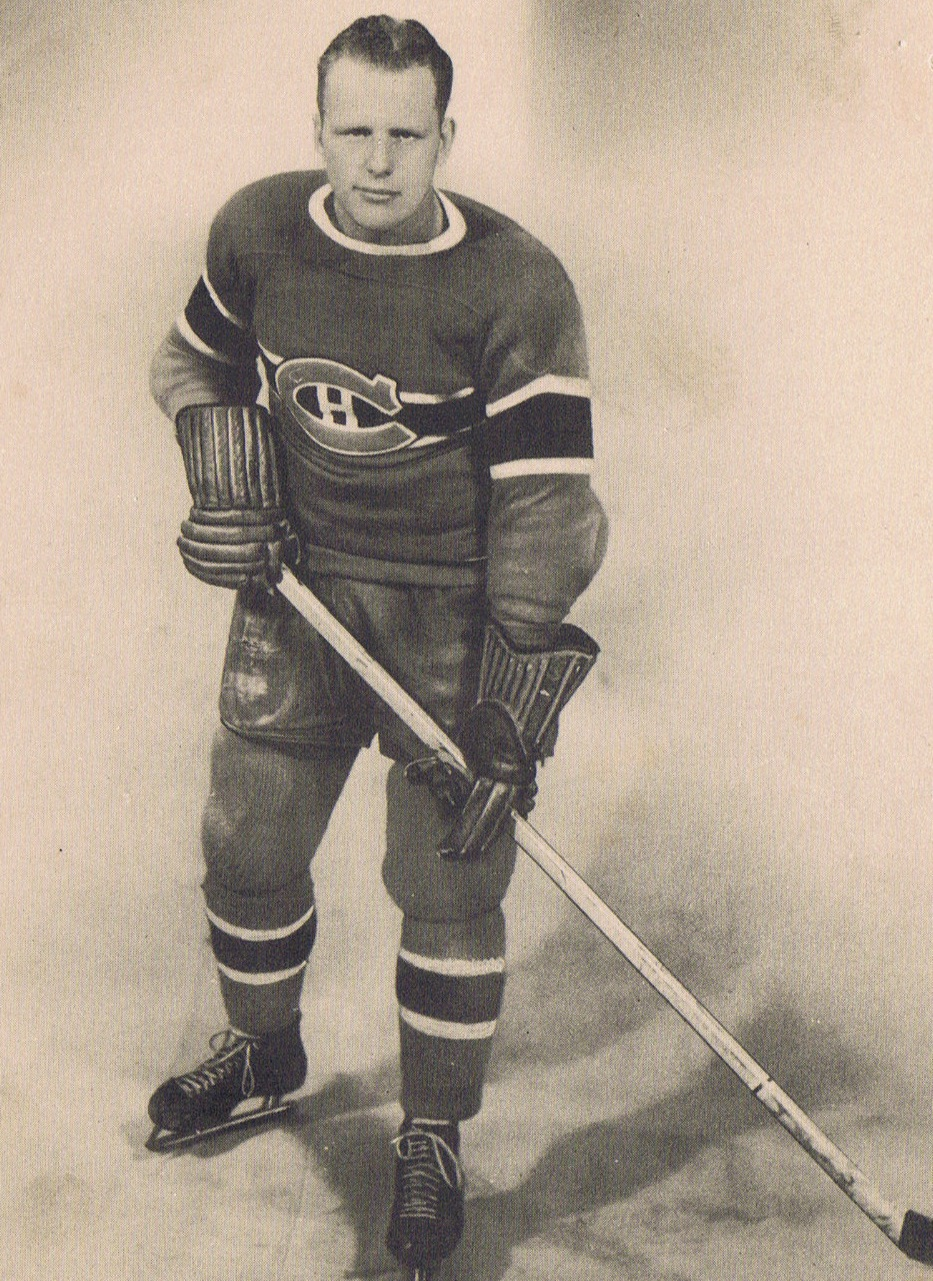
- Goupille in 1939
- Born: September 2, 1915; Trois-Rivières, Quebec, Canada
- Died: July 4, 2005 (aged 89); Victoriaville, Quebec, Canada
- Height: 6 ft 0 in (183 cm)
- Weight: 190 lb (86 kg; 13 st 8 lb)
- Position: Defence
- Shot: Left
- Played for: Montreal Canadiens
- Playing career: 1936–1951

Joseph Emilien Clifford "Red" Goupille (September 2, 1915 – July 4, 2005) was a Canadian ice hockey player who played 224 games in the National Hockey League with the Montreal Canadiens between 1936 and 1942.

== Career statistics ==
=== Regular season and playoffs ===
			Regular season					Playoffs
Season	Team	League	GP	G	A	Pts	PIM	GP	G	A	Pts	PIM
1935–36	Montreal Canadiens	NHL	4	0	0	0	0	—	—	—	—	—
1935–36	Montreal LaFontaine Bleus	MCHL	22	7	11	18	54	—	—	—	—	—
1936–37	Montreal Canadiens	NHL	5	0	0	0	0	—	—	—	—	—
1936–37	New Haven Eagles	IAHL	34	6	4	10	78	—	—	—	—	—
1937–38	Montreal Canadiens	NHL	47	4	5	9	44	3	2	0	2	4
1938–39	Montreal Canadiens	NHL	18	0	2	2	24	—	—	—	—	—
1938–39	New Haven Eagles	IAHL	36	6	6	12	54	—	—	—	—	—
1939–40	Montreal Canadiens	NHL	48	2	10	12	48	—	—	—	—	—
1940–41	Montreal Canadiens	NHL	48	3	6	9	81	2	0	0	0	0
1941–42	Montreal Canadiens	NHL	48	1	5	6	51	3	0	0	0	2
1942–43	Montreal Canadiens	NHL	6	2	0	2	8	—	—	—	—	—
1942–43	Montreal Army	QSHL	22	3	5	8	37	7	0	3	3	20
1945–46	Hull Volants	QSHL	40	4	13	17	95	—	—	—	—	—
1946–47	Sherbrooke Saint-Francois	QSHL	42	9	19	28	112	10	4	7	11	10
1946–47	Sherbrooke Saint-Francois	Al-Cup	—	—	—	—	—	4	0	1	1	8
1947–48	Sherbrooke Saint-Francois	QSHL	61	12	31	43	101	9	1	3	4	20
1948–49	Sherbrooke Saint-Francois	QSHL	63	6	16	22	90	12	1	1	2	24
1949–50	Sherbrooke Saints	QSHL	57	4	19	23	51	12	0	2	2	2
1949–50	Sherbrooke Saints	Al-Cup	—	—	—	—	—	5	1	1	2	6
1950–51	Sherbrooke Saints	QMHL	59	1	15	16	54	7	0	0	0	6
NHL totals			224	12	28	40	256	8	2	0	2	6
