= Johnny Gagnon =

Canadian ice hockey player (1905–1984)

- Born: June 8, 1905 Chicoutimi, Quebec, Canada
- Died: March 21, 1984 (aged 78) Cranston, Rhode Island, U.S.
- Height: 5 ft 5 in (165 cm)
- Weight: 140 lb (64 kg; 10 st 0 lb)
- Position: Right wing
- Shot: Right
- Played for: Montreal Canadiens; Boston Bruins; New York Americans
- Playing career: 1923–1945

Jean Joseph "Black Cat" Gagnon (June 3, 1905 – March 21, 1984) was a Canadian ice hockey forward.

Johnny played in the National Hockey League from 1930 to 1940. During this time, he played for the New York Americans, Boston Bruins, and Montreal Canadiens. He also played for the Providence Reds of the American Hockey League. He won the Stanley Cup in 1931 with the Montreal Canadiens. Gagnon loved to tell the story of how, as a Canadiens "wanna-be," he filled his pockets with 10 pounds (4.5 kg) of rocks during a weigh-up and, having impressed Canadiens brass with his 150 lb (68 kg) weight, got a tryout with the team, who had formerly shunned him as being "too light for pro hockey." Gagnon was a modest sort who gave all the credit to his two superstar linemates, Howie Morenz and Aurel Joliat, claiming he'd simply pass them the puck, stand back, and get the assists.

After his retirement, he became a scout for the New York Rangers. He was in part responsible for the Rangers getting the great goaltender Eddie Giacomin, scouting him when he played for the American Hockey League's Providence Reds and becoming friends with Giacomin. He gave Rangers' general manager Emile Francis glowing reports on Giacomin, and finally Francis decided to see Giacomin play. Francis eventually obtained Giacomin for four players.

Gagnon died after a lengthy illness on March 21, 1984.

== Career statistics ==
=== Regular season and playoffs ===
			Regular season					Playoffs
Season	Team	League	GP	G	A	Pts	PIM	GP	G	A	Pts	PIM
1922–23	Chicoutimi Bluets	QPHL	7	0	0	0	—	1	0	0	0	—
1922–23	Quebec Bulldogs	Big-4	3	0	0	0	—	—	—	—	—	—
1923–24	Trois-Rivieres Renards	ECHL	9	2	0	2	—	—	—	—	—	—
1924–25	Trois-Rivieres Renards	ECHL	16	18	0	18	—	2	5	0	5	—
1925–26	Quebec Sons of Ireland	QAHA	10	5	0	5	—	6	4	0	4	—
1926–27	Quebec Castors	Can-Am	32	27	6	33	54	2	0	0	0	5
1927–28	Providence Reds	Can-Am	39	20	4	24	80	—	—	—	—	—
1928–29	Providence Reds	Can-Am	39	7	3	10	50	6	4	0	4	10
1929–30	Providence Reds	Can-Am	39	21	17	38	72	3	2	4	6	6
1930–31	Montreal Canadiens	NHL	41	18	7	25	43	10	6	2	8	8
1931–32	Montreal Canadiens	NHL	48	19	18	37	40	4	1	1	2	4
1932–33	Montreal Canadiens	NHL	48	12	23	35	64	2	0	2	2	0
1933–34	Montreal Canadiens	NHL	48	9	15	24	25	2	1	0	1	2
1934–35	Boston Bruins	NHL	24	1	1	2	9	—	—	—	—	—
1934–35	Montreal Canadiens	NHL	23	1	5	6	2	2	0	1	1	2
1935–36	Montreal Canadiens	NHL	48	7	9	16	42	—	—	—	—	—
1936–37	Montreal Canadiens	NHL	48	20	16	36	38	5	2	1	3	9
1937–38	Montreal Canadiens	NHL	47	13	17	30	9	3	1	3	4	2
1938–39	Montreal Canadiens	NHL	45	12	22	34	23	3	0	2	2	10
1939–40	Montreal Canadiens	NHL	10	4	5	9	0	—	—	—	—	—
1939–40	New York Americans	NHL	24	4	3	7	0	1	1	0	1	0
1940–41	Shawinigan Cataracts	QSHL	33	15	26	41	58	10	3	8	11	12
1941–42	North Sydney Victorias	CBSHL	23	5	11	16	6	6	2	4	6	4
1942–43	Providence Reds	AHL	50	9	10	19	12	—	—	—	—	—
1944–45	Providence Reds	AHL	9	0	5	5	0	—	—	—	—	—
NHL totals			454	120	141	261	295	32	12	12	24	37
