= Jack Beattie (ice hockey) =

English-born Canadian ice hockey player

- Born: 2 October 1907 Ibstock, England
- Died: 26 December 1990 (aged 83) Chemainus, British Columbia, Canada
- Height: 5 ft 9 in (175 cm)
- Weight: 170 lb (77 kg; 12 st 2 lb)
- Position: Left wing
- Shot: Left
- Played for: Boston Bruins; Detroit Red Wings; New York Americans
- Playing career: 1928–1939

John "Red" Beattie (2 October 1907 – 26 December 1990) was a Canadian professional ice hockey forward. He played in the National Hockey League with the Boston Bruins, Detroit Red Wings and New York Americans from 1930 to 1939.

== Playing career ==
Beattie was born in Ibstock, Leicestershire, England, and grew up in Edmonton, Alberta. He played 335 games in the National Hockey League, for the Boston Bruins, Detroit Red Wings and New York Americans. He played junior hockey in Vancouver.

== Career statistics ==
=== Regular season and playoffs ===
			Regular season					Playoffs
Season	Team	League	GP	G	A	Pts	PIM	GP	G	A	Pts	PIM
1925–26	Edmonton Superiors	ESrHL	—	—	—	—	—	—	—	—	—	—
1926–27	Edmonton Superiors	ESrHL	—	—	—	—	—	—	—	—	—	—
1927–28	Edmonton Superiors	ESrHL	—	—	—	—	—	—	—	—	—	—
1928–29	Vancouver Lions	PCHL	26	5	0	5	24	2	0	0	0	2
1929–30	Vancouver Lions	PCHL	36	12	9	21	30	4	2	0	2	2
1930–31	Springfield Indians	Can-Am	7	8	6	14	4	—	—	—	—	—
1930–31	Boston Bruins	NHL	32	10	11	21	25	4	0	0	0	0
1931–32	Boston Bruins	NHL	1	0	0	0	0	—	—	—	—	—
1932–33	Boston Bruins	NHL	48	8	12	20	12	5	0	0	0	2
1933–34	Boston Bruins	NHL	48	9	13	22	26	—	—	—	—	—
1934–35	Boston Bruins	NHL	48	9	18	27	27	4	1	0	1	2
1935–36	Boston Bruins	NHL	48	14	18	32	27	2	0	0	0	2
1936–37	Boston Bruins	NHL	48	8	7	15	10	3	1	0	1	0
1937–38	Boston Bruins	NHL	14	0	0	0	0	—	—	—	—	—
1937–38	Detroit Red Wings	NHL	11	1	2	3	0	—	—	—	—	—
1937–38	Pittsburgh Hornets	IAHL	2	0	0	0	0	—	—	—	—	—
1937–38	New York Americans	NHL	19	3	4	7	5	6	2	2	4	2
1938–39	New York Americans	NHL	17	0	0	0	5	—	—	—	—	—
1938–39	New Haven Eagles	IAHL	13	1	3	4	2	—	—	—	—	—
1941–42	Vancouver Norvans	PCHL	21	15	9	24	6	3	1	0	1	2
1942–43	Victoria VMD	NNDHL	16	6	1	7	11	—	—	—	—	—
1942–43	Vancouver Army	BCDHL	2	1	0	1	4	—	—	—	—	—
NHL totals			334	62	85	147	137	24	4	2	6	8

Preceded by Eddie Shore	Boston Bruins captain 1936–37	Succeeded by Cooney Weiland
