= 1943 Stanley Cup Final =

1943 ice hockey championship series

	1	2	3	4	Total
Detroit Red Wings	6	4	4	2	4
Boston Bruins	2	3	0	0	0
- Location(s): Detroit: Olympia Stadium (1, 2); Boston: Boston Garden (3, 4)
- Coaches: Detroit: Jack Adams; Boston: Art Ross
- Captains: Detroit: Sid Abel; Boston: Dit Clapper
- Dates: April 1–8, 1943
- Series-winning goal: Joe Carveth (12:09, first)
- Hall of Famers: Red Wings: Sid Abel (1969); Ebbie Goodfellow (1963; did not play); Syd Howe (1965); Jack Stewart (1964); Harry Watson (1994); Bruins: Frank Brimsek (1966); Dit Clapper (1947); Bill Cowley (1968); Busher Jackson (1971); Coaches: Jack Adams (1959, player); Art Ross (1949, player)

The 1943 Stanley Cup Final was a best-of-seven series between the Boston Bruins and the Detroit Red Wings. The Red Wings, appearing in their third straight Finals, swept the Bruins to win their third Stanley Cup.

== Paths to the Finals ==
Boston defeated the Montreal Canadiens in five games to advance to the Finals. The Red Wings defeated the Toronto Maple Leafs in six games to advance and avenge their defeat in the previous year's Finals after the Maple Leafs erased a 3-0 series deficit to win the Cup.

== Game summaries ==
Goalie Johnny Mowers shutout the Bruins in the final two games.

April 1	Boston Bruins	2–6	Detroit Red Wings	Olympia Stadium	Recap
Art Jackson (4) - 18:13		First period	1:15 - Jack Stewart (1)
No scoring		Second period	1:12 - Mud Bruneteau (3); 15:43 - sh - Sid Abel (5); 19:06 - Joe Carveth (4)
Ab DeMarco (3) - 17:53		Third period	1:21 - Mud Bruneteau (4); 16:24 - Mud Bruneteau (5)
Frank Brimsek		Goalie stats	Johnny Mowers

April 4	Boston Bruins	3–4	Detroit Red Wings	Olympia Stadium	Recap
No scoring		First period	No scoring
Jack Crawford (1) - 10:16; Art Jackson (5) - 11:04		Second period	17:06 - Les Douglas (2)
Art Jackson (6) - 16:38		Third period	5:55 - Joe Carveth (5); 6:21 - Carl Liscombe (5); 13:16 - Syd Howe (1)
Frank Brimsek		Goalie stats	Johnny Mowers

April 7	Detroit Red Wings	4–0	Boston Bruins	Boston Garden	Recap
Don Grosso (2) - 3:26; Don Grosso (3) - pp - 10:16		First period	No scoring
No scoring		Second period	No scoring
Les Douglas (3) - 8:03; Don Grosso (4) - 16:41		Third period	No scoring
Johnny Mowers		Goalie stats	Frank Brimsek

April 8	Detroit Red Wings	2–0	Boston Bruins	Boston Garden	Recap
Joe Carveth (6) - 12:09		First period	No scoring
Carl Liscombe (6) - 2:45		Second period	No scoring
No scoring		Third period	No scoring
Johnny Mowers		Goalie stats	Frank Brimsek

Detroit won series 4–0

== Stanley Cup engraving ==
The 1943 Stanley Cup was presented to Red Wings captain Sid Abel by NHL President Red Dutton following the Red Wings 2–0 win over the Bruins in game four.

The following Red Wings players and staff had their names engraved on the Stanley Cup

1942–43 Detroit Red Wings

=== Players ===
Centres

- 3 Alex Motter
- 8 Syd Howe
- 12 Sid Abel (Captain)
- 16-13 Connie Brown
- 18 Les Douglas
- 18 Johnny Holota

Wingers

- 7 Carl Liscombe
- 9 Mordere Mud Bruneteau
- 10 Don Grosso
- 14 Joe Carveth
- 16 Adam Brown
- 17 Harry Watson
- 16 Joe Fisher*

Defencemen

- 2 Jack Stewart
- 4 Jimmy Orlando
- 11 Eddie Wares
- 15 John Cully Simon
- 16-19–5 Harold "Hal" Jackson
- 5 Ebbie Goodfellow (playing-Co-Coach)

Goaltenders

- 1 Johnny Mowers

* Did not play in Finals.

=== Coaching and administrative staff ===
- James E. Norris Sr. (President/Owner), James D. Norris Jr. (Vice President/Owner)
- Arthur Wirtz Sr. (Secretary-Treasurer/Owner), Jack Adams (Manager-Coach)
- Frank "Honey" Walker (Trainer)

=== Stanley Cup engraving ===
- Jack Adams (Manager-Coach) was suspended during the playoffs, so injured defenceman Ebbie Goodfellow served as Coach during Adams' suspension. When the cup was engraved, Adams was listed as Manager and Goodfellow as Coach, even though Adams was officially the Manager-Coach.
- Johnny Holota was originally left off the Stanley Cup. When cup was redone during 1957–58 season Holota's name was added to the Cup. John Holota played only 12 games, did not play in the playoffs, and did not qualify to be engraved on the Stanley Cup
- Carl Mattson (Asst. Trainer) was left off the Stanley Cup, but was included on mid-season team picture.
- * Joe Fisher name was included on the cup for playing 1 regular season game and 1 playoff game (Semi-Finals). NHL no longer recognizes Fisher as playing in the playoffs in 1943, but did dress for 1 game

== See also ==
- 1942–43 NHL season

== References and notes ==
- NHL (2000). Total Stanley Cup. Dan Diamond & Associates.
- Podnieks, Andrew; Hockey Hall of Fame (2004). Lord Stanley's Cup. Bolton, Ont.: Fenn Pub. pp 12, 50. ISBN 978-1-55168-261-7
- "All-Time NHL Results". Archived from the original on July 24, 2017.

Preceded by Toronto Maple Leafs; 1942	Detroit Red Wings; Stanley Cup champions 1943	Succeeded by Montreal Canadiens; 1944
