= Eddie Wares =

Canadian ice hockey player

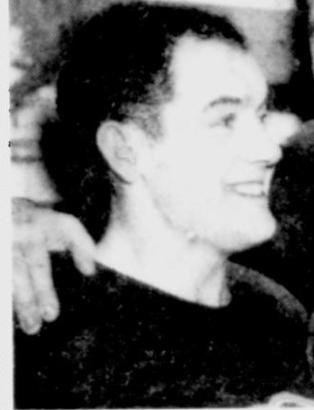
- Born: March 19, 1915 Calgary, Alberta, Canada
- Died: February 29, 1992 (aged 76)
- Height: 5 ft 10 in (178 cm)
- Weight: 184 lb (83 kg; 13 st 2 lb)
- Position: Right wing
- Shot: Right
- Played for: Detroit Red Wings; Chicago Black Hawks; New York Rangers
- Playing career: 1934–1952

Edward George Wares (March 19, 1915 – February 29, 1992) was a Canadian professional ice hockey player who played 324 games in the National Hockey League with the New York Rangers, Detroit Red Wings, and Chicago Black Hawks between 1937 and 1947. He won the Stanley Cup in 1943 with the Red Wings.

Wares was born in Calgary, Alberta.

== Career statistics ==
=== Regular season and playoffs ===
			Regular season					Playoffs
Season	Team	League	GP	G	A	Pts	PIM	GP	G	A	Pts	PIM
1931–32	Calgary Shamrocks	CCJHL	1	0	0	0	0	—	—	—	—	—
1932–33	Calgary Jimmies	CCJHL	—	—	—	—	—	—	—	—	—	—
1932–33	Calgary Jimmies	M-Cup	—	—	—	—	—	7	0	1	1	4
1933–34	Calgary Jimmies	CCJHL	3	5	2	7	4	—	—	—	—	—
1933–34	Calgary Jimmies	M-Cup	—	—	—	—	—	3	1	2	3	2
1934–35	Calgary Bronks	ASHL	12	13	4	17	6	2	1	0	1	0
1935–36	Philadelphia Ramblers	Can-Am	48	7	6	13	29	3	1	0	1	2
1936–37	New York Rangers	NHL	2	2	0	2	0	—	—	—	—	—
1936–37	Philadelphia Ramblers	IAHL	50	10	23	33	30	6	1	1	2	8
1937–38	Detroit Red Wings	NHL	21	9	7	16	2	—	—	—	—	—
1937–38	Philadelphia Ramblers	IAHL	25	12	14	26	4	—	—	—	—	—
1938–39	Detroit Red Wings	NHL	30	8	8	16	10	6	1	0	1	8
1939–40	Detroit Red Wings	NHL	33	2	6	8	19	5	0	0	0	0
1939–40	Indianapolis Capitals	IAHL	1	0	0	0	0	—	—	—	—	—
1940–41	Detroit Red Wings	NHL	42	10	16	26	34	2	0	0	0	0
1940–41	Indianapolis Capitals	AHL	1	0	0	0	0	—	—	—	—	—
1941–42	Detroit Red Wings	NHL	43	9	29	38	31	12	1	3	4	20
1942–43	Detroit Red Wings	NHL	47	12	18	30	10	10	3	3	6	4
1943–44	Calgary Combines	CSRHL	16	4	4	8	18	2	2	2	4	6
1944–45	Calgary Navy	CNDHL	2	0	0	0	4	—	—	—	—	—
1944–45	Halifax Navy	NSDHL	—	—	—	—	—	3	2	0	2	4
1945–46	Chicago Black Hawks	NHL	46	4	11	15	34	3	0	1	1	0
1946–47	Chicago Black Hawks	NHL	60	4	7	11	21	—	—	—	—	—
1947–48	Cleveland Barons	AHL	66	6	22	28	20	9	0	1	1	2
1948–49	Cleveland Barons	AHL	44	1	17	18	10	—	—	—	—	—
1948–49	Kansas City Pla-Mors	USHL	20	4	6	10	0	2	0	0	0	0
1949–50	Vancouver Canucks	PCHL	42	5	11	16	6	—	—	—	—	—
1950–51	Nelson Maple Leafs	WIHL	34	6	12	18	66	4	0	0	0	6
1951–52	Nelson Maple Leafs	WIHL	26	6	7	13	12	8	0	3	3	0
1952–53	Nelson Maple Leafs	WIHL	6	1	6	7	20	—	—	—	—	—
NHL totals			324	60	102	162	161	38	5	7	12	32
