= List of NHL seasons =

This is a list of seasons of the National Hockey League (NHL), a professional ice hockey league, since its inception in 1917. The list also includes the seasons of the National Hockey Association (NHA), the predecessor organization of the NHL, which had several teams that would continue play in the NHL. Only two franchises, the Montreal Canadiens and Toronto Maple Leafs (formerly the Arenas and St. Patricks), still exist from the founding of the league. The Quebec Bulldogs, which suspended after the last NHA season, returned to play in the third NHL season, although they were considered founding members of the NHL. The league would move the team to Hamilton in 1920 and dissolve the team in 1925. The original Ottawa Senators would continue in the league until 1935, where, after one season in St. Louis as the St. Louis Eagles, the franchise was dissolved by the league. The current Ottawa Senators franchise does recognize the history of the original Senators (through retired numbers and a heritage jersey). The list is sub-divided using the same eras as the series of articles on the history of the National Hockey League.

== Championship format ==
Like predecessor leagues, the champion of the NHA league since its founding was the team with the best regular season record, with a playoff used only if more than one team had the best win–loss record. This changed in 1917 with the invention of the split-season, whereby the champion became the winner of the annual playoff. The NHL continued the split-season and playoff format upon the winding up of the NHA organization. Except for the 1919–20 season, when there was no playoff because Ottawa won both halves of the season, the champion of the NHL has been the playoff champion.

The NHA champion was awarded the O'Brien Cup. This was continued by the NHL. Until 1927, the NHL champion was awarded the O'Brien Cup, supplemented by the Prince of Wales Trophy, starting in 1925. To win the Stanley Cup, the NHL champion had to play and win a "world's series" with the champion of the Pacific Coast or Western Canada leagues. After 1927, the NHL playoff champion was awarded the Stanley Cup, while the O'Brien Cup and Prince of Wales Trophy were reused as division championship and playoff runner-up awards.

== 1910–1917: National Hockey Association ==
Hockey seasons traditionally started in January and ended in March until the 1910–11 season which was the first to start before the new year. The 1911–12 season saw the elimination of the rover position, reducing number of skaters per side to six, and changing the game to three 20-minute periods from two 30-minute periods. The 1916–17 season saw the introduction of the split schedule, an innovation attributed to Toronto NHA owner Eddie Livingstone. To symbolize the league championship, the NHA champion was awarded the O'Brien Cup, donated by the O'Brien family, owners of silver mines (being the source of the silver in the trophy), owners of several of the NHA franchises, and original owner of the Montreal Canadiens.

Season	Final^{[4a, b, c]}	No. of Teams	Reg. season games	Start (begin reg. season)	Finish (incl. NHA playoffs)	Top record	Champion
1910	1910	7	12	January 5	March 15	Montreal Wanderers (11–1–0)	Montreal Wanderers
1910–11	1911	5	16	December 31	March 10	Ottawa Hockey Club (13–3–0)	Ottawa Hockey Club
1911–12	1912	4	18	December 30	March 5	Quebec Bulldogs (10–8–0)	Quebec Bulldogs
1912–13	1913	6	20	December 25	March 5	Quebec Bulldogs (16–4–0)	Quebec Bulldogs
1913–14	1914	6	20	December 27	March 11	Toronto Blueshirts, Montreal Canadiens (13–7–0)^{[2]}	Toronto Blueshirts
1914–15	1915	6	20	December 26	March 13	Ottawa Senators, Montreal Wanderers (14–6–0)^{[2]}	Ottawa Senators^{[1]}
1915–16	1916	5	24	December 18	March 18	Montreal Canadiens (16–7–1)	Montreal Canadiens
1916–17	1917	6/4^{[3]}	20	December 27	March 10	Montreal Canadiens (7–3–0) (1st half); Ottawa Senators (8–2–0) (2nd half)	Montreal Canadiens^{[1]}^{[5]}

Notes

1. All champion teams are also Stanley Cup champions unless marked.
2. The league did not use tiebreakers to determine the top record. The two teams played off to determine the championship.
3. Toronto and Battalion did not participate in the second half.
4a. No Final prior to 1914; Stanley Cup awarded to league winners and defended on a challenge basis.
4b. Final in 1915 and 1916 contested between top two teams of regular season.
4c. Final from 1917 through 1921 contested between qualifier from first half-season and qualifier from second half-season.

== 1917–1942: Early years ==
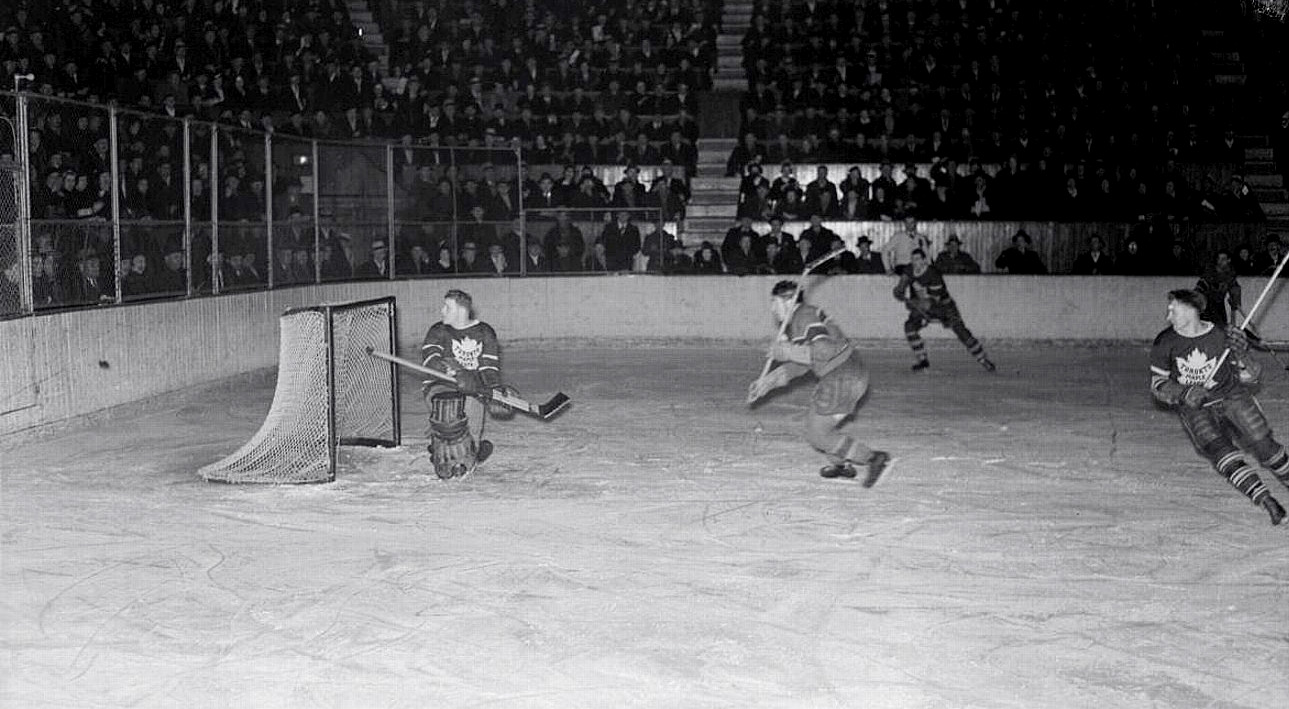
The Montreal Canadiens host the Toronto Maple Leafs in 1938

The NHL started with three of the six NHA clubs (Montreal Canadiens, Montreal Wanderers and Ottawa Senators) and a Toronto franchise run by the Toronto Arena Co., which leased the players of the Toronto Blueshirts. Almost immediately after starting the season, the Wanderers folded, leaving three teams to complete the season. The same three teams returned for 1918–19 before Quebec 'returned' for 1919–20, moving to Hamilton the following year. The same four-team configuration lasted until 1924–25 when the Montreal Maroons and the Boston Bruins joined the league. Expansion into other cities followed, lasting until the 1930s, when several teams folded.

The new NHL did not have a championship trophy at first. The O'Brien Cup was revived in November 1921, and served as the league championship trophy until 1927. The new Prince of Wales Trophy, donated in 1925, was also given to the league champion until 1927. Henceforth, the trophies were designated for divisional championships, and the Stanley Cup became the de facto league championship trophy.

No.	Season	Playoffs	Stanley Cup Final^{[4c]}	No. of teams	Reg. season games	Start (reg. season)	Finish (incl. NHL playoffs)	Top record	Champion
1	1917–18	1918^{[1]}	1918	4/3^{[5]}	22	December 19	March 13	Montreal Canadiens (10–4–0) (1st half); Toronto Hockey Club (5–3–0) (2nd half)	Toronto Hockey Club
2	1918–19	1919	1919	3	18	December 19	March 6	Montreal Canadiens (7–3–0) (1st half); Ottawa Senators (7–1–0) (2nd half)	Montreal Canadiens^{[1]}
3	1919–20	1920	1920	4^{[6]}	24	December 23	March 10^{[7]}	Ottawa Senators (9–3–0) (1st half); Ottawa Senators (10–2–0) (2nd half)	Ottawa Senators
4	1920–21	1921	1921	4	24	December 22	March 15	Ottawa Senators (8–2–0) (1st half); Toronto St. Pats (10–4–0) (2nd half)	Ottawa Senators
5	1921–22	1922	1922	4	24	December 17	March 13	Ottawa Senators (14–8–2)	Toronto St. Pats
6	1922–23	1923	1923	4	24	December 16	March 9	Ottawa Senators (14–9–1)	Ottawa Senators
7	1923–24	1924	1924	4	24	December 15	March 11	Ottawa Senators (16–8–0)	Montreal Canadiens
8	1924–25	1925	1925	6^{[8]}	30	November 29	March 13	Hamilton Tigers (19–10–1)	Montreal Canadiens^{[1]}
9	1925–26	1926	1926	7^{[9]}	36	November 28	March 27	Ottawa Senators (24–8–4)	Montreal Maroons
10	1926–27	1927	1927	10^{[10]}	44	November 18	April 13	Ottawa Senators (30–10–4)	Ottawa Senators
11	1927–28	1928	1928	10	44	November 15	April 14	Montreal Canadiens (26–11–7)	New York Rangers
12	1928–29	1929	1929	10	44	November 15	March 29	Montreal Canadiens (22–7–15)	Boston Bruins
13	1929–30	1930	1930	10	44	November 14	April 3	Boston Bruins (38–5–1)	Montreal Canadiens
14	1930–31	1931	1931	10	44	November 11	April 14	Boston Bruins (28–10–6)	Montreal Canadiens
15	1931–32	1932	1932	8^{[11]}	48	November 12	April 9	Montreal Canadiens (25–16–7)	Toronto Maple Leafs
16	1932–33	1933	1933	9^{[12]}	48	November 10	April 13	Boston Bruins (25–15–8)	New York Rangers
17	1933–34	1934	1934	9	48	November 9	April 10	Toronto Maple Leafs (26–13–9)	Chicago Black Hawks
18	1934–35	1935	1935	9	48	November 8	April 9	Toronto Maple Leafs (30–14–4)	Montreal Maroons
19	1935–36	1936	1936	8^{[13]}	48	November 7	April 11	Detroit Red Wings (24–16–8)	Detroit Red Wings
20	1936–37	1937	1937	8	48	November 5	April 15	Detroit Red Wings (25–14–9)	Detroit Red Wings
21	1937–38	1938	1938	8	48	November 4	April 12	Boston Bruins (30–11–7)	Chicago Black Hawks
22	1938–39	1939	1939	7^{[14]}	48	November 3	April 16	Boston Bruins (36–10–2)	Boston Bruins
23	1939–40	1940	1940	7	48	November 2	April 13	Boston Bruins (31–12–5)	New York Rangers
24	1940–41	1941	1941	7	48	November 3	April 12	Boston Bruins (27–8–13)	Boston Bruins
25	1941–42	1942	1942	7	48	November 1	April 18	New York Rangers (29–17–2)	Toronto Maple Leafs

Notes

1. All champion teams are also Stanley Cup champions unless marked.
4c. Final from 1917 through 1921 contested between qualifier from first half-season and qualifier from second half-season.
5. Wanderers withdrew after six games (four completed, two forfeited).
6. The Quebec Bulldogs started play.
7. No playoffs.
8. The Montreal Maroons and Boston Bruins started play.
9. The New York Americans and Pittsburgh Pirates started play. Hamilton Tigers dissolved.
10. The Chicago Black Hawks, Detroit Cougars and New York Rangers started play.
11. The Ottawa Senators and Philadelphia Quakers suspended operations for the season.
12. The Ottawa Senators resumed play.
13. The St. Louis Eagles were dissolved.
14. The Montreal Maroons were dissolved.

== 1942–1967: Original Six era ==
Prior to the 1942–43 season, the New York Americans suspended operations. This reduced the number of teams to six, starting the 'Original Six' era. During the Original Six era, the NHL played in a single six-team division. Each season, four of the six teams qualified for the playoffs to determine the Stanley Cup and NHL champion.

No.	Season	Playoffs	Final	Reg. season games	Start (reg. season)	Finish (incl. playoffs)	Top record	Champion
26	1942–43	1943	1943	50	October 31	April 8	Detroit Red Wings (25–14–11)	Detroit Red Wings
27	1943–44	1944	1944	50	October 30	April 13	Montreal Canadiens (38–5–7)	Montreal Canadiens
28	1944–45	1945	1945	50	October 28	April 22	Montreal Canadiens (38–8–4)	Toronto Maple Leafs
29	1945–46	1946	1946	50	October 24	April 9	Montreal Canadiens (28–17–5)	Montreal Canadiens
30	1946–47	1947	1947	60	October 16	April 19	Montreal Canadiens (34–16–10)	Toronto Maple Leafs
31	1947–48	1948	1948	60	October 15	April 14	Toronto Maple Leafs (32–15–13)	Toronto Maple Leafs
32	1948–49	1949	1949	60	October 13	April 16	Detroit Red Wings (34–19–7)	Toronto Maple Leafs
33	1949–50	1950	1950	70	October 12	April 23	Detroit Red Wings (37–19–14)	Detroit Red Wings
34	1950–51	1951	1951	70	October 11	April 21	Detroit Red Wings (44–13–13)	Toronto Maple Leafs
35	1951–52	1952	1952	70	October 11	April 15	Detroit Red Wings (44–14–12)	Detroit Red Wings
36	1952–53	1953	1953	70	October 9	April 16	Detroit Red Wings (36–16–18)	Montreal Canadiens
37	1953–54	1954	1954	70	October 8	April 16	Detroit Red Wings (37–19–14)	Detroit Red Wings
38	1954–55	1955	1955	70	October 7	April 14	Detroit Red Wings (42–11–11)	Detroit Red Wings
39	1955–56	1956	1956	70	October 6	April 10	Montreal Canadiens (45–15–10)	Montreal Canadiens
40	1956–57	1957	1957	70	October 11	April 16	Detroit Red Wings (38–20–12)	Montreal Canadiens
41	1957–58	1958	1958	70	October 8	April 20	Montreal Canadiens (43–17–10)	Montreal Canadiens
42	1958–59	1959	1959	70	October 8	April 18	Montreal Canadiens (39–18–13)	Montreal Canadiens
43	1959–60	1960	1960	70	October 7	April 14	Montreal Canadiens (40–18–12)	Montreal Canadiens
44	1960–61	1961	1961	70	October 5	April 16	Montreal Canadiens (41–19–10)	Chicago Black Hawks
45	1961–62	1962	1962	70	October 11	April 22	Montreal Canadiens (42–14–14)	Toronto Maple Leafs
46	1962–63	1963	1963	70	October 12	April 18	Toronto Maple Leafs (35–23–12)	Toronto Maple Leafs
47	1963–64	1964	1964	70	October 8	April 25	Montreal Canadiens (36–21–13)	Toronto Maple Leafs
48	1964–65	1965	1965	70	October 12	May 1	Detroit Red Wings (40–23–7)	Montreal Canadiens
49	1965–66	1966	1966	70	October 23	May 5	Montreal Canadiens (41–21–8)	Montreal Canadiens
50	1966–67	1967	1967	70	October 19	May 2	Chicago Black Hawks (41–17–12)	Toronto Maple Leafs

== 1967–1992: Expansion era ==
Since 1967, the league re-organized several times as it grew. In 1967, the league played in two divisions, with the playoff winner of each division playing off for the NHL championship. As the league grew the league changed its championship format to allow cross-over seeding, then changed to a division-based championship, leading to conference-based championship, with conference champions playing off for the Stanley Cup. In 1985, the Presidents' Trophy was inaugurated to reward the team with the top regular season record, irrespective of division or conference.

No.	Season	Playoffs	Final	No. of teams	Reg. season games	Start (reg. season)	Finish (incl. playoffs)	Top record	Champion
51	1967–68	1968	1968	12^{[15]}	74	October 11	May 11	Montreal Canadiens (42–22–10)	Montreal Canadiens
52	1968–69	1969	1969	12	76	October 11	May 4	Montreal Canadiens (46–19–11)	Montreal Canadiens
53	1969–70	1970	1970	12	76	October 11	May 10	Chicago Black Hawks (45–22–9)	Boston Bruins
54	1970–71	1971	1971	14^{[16]}	78	October 9	May 18	Boston Bruins (57–14–7)	Montreal Canadiens
55	1971–72	1972	1972	14	78	October 8	May 11	Boston Bruins (54–13–11)	Boston Bruins
56	1972–73	1973	1973	16^{[17]}	78	October 7	May 10	Montreal Canadiens (52–10–16)	Montreal Canadiens
57	1973–74	1974	1974	16	78	October 10	May 19	Boston Bruins (52–17–9)	Philadelphia Flyers
58	1974–75	1975	1975	18^{[18]}	80	October 9	May 27	Philadelphia Flyers (51–18–11)	Philadelphia Flyers
59	1975–76	1976	1976	18	80	October 7	May 16	Montreal Canadiens (58–11–11)	Montreal Canadiens
60	1976–77	1977	1977	18^{[19]}	80	October 5	May 14	Montreal Canadiens (60–8–12)	Montreal Canadiens
61	1977–78	1978	1978	18	80	October 12	May 25	Montreal Canadiens (59–10–11)	Montreal Canadiens
62	1978–79	1979	1979	17^{[20]}	80	October 11	May 21	New York Islanders (51–15–14)	Montreal Canadiens
63	1979–80	1980	1980	21^{[21]}	80	October 9	May 24	Philadelphia Flyers (48–12–20)	New York Islanders
64	1980–81	1981	1981	21^{[22]}	80	October 9	May 21	New York Islanders (48–18–14)	New York Islanders
65	1981–82	1982	1982	21	80	October 6	May 16	New York Islanders (54–16–10)	New York Islanders
66	1982–83	1983	1983	21^{[23]}	80	October 5	May 17	Boston Bruins (50–20–10)	New York Islanders
67	1983–84	1984	1984	21	80	October 4	May 19	Edmonton Oilers (57–18–5)	Edmonton Oilers
68	1984–85	1985	1985	21	80	October 11	May 30	Philadelphia Flyers (53–20–7)	Edmonton Oilers
69	1985–86	1986	1986	21	80	October 10	May 24	Edmonton Oilers (56–17–7)	Montreal Canadiens
70	1986–87	1987	1987	21	80	October 9	May 31	Edmonton Oilers (50–24–6)	Edmonton Oilers
71	1987–88	1988	1988	21	80	October 8	May 26	Calgary Flames (48–23–9)	Edmonton Oilers
72	1988–89	1989	1989	21	80	October 6	May 25	Calgary Flames (54–17–9)	Calgary Flames
73	1989–90	1990	1990	21	80	October 5	May 24	Boston Bruins (46–25–9)	Edmonton Oilers
74	1990–91	1991	1991	21	80	October 4	May 25	Chicago Blackhawks (49–23–8)	Pittsburgh Penguins
75	1991–92	1992	1992	22^{[24]}	80	October 3	June 1	New York Rangers (50–25–5)	Pittsburgh Penguins

Notes

15. The California Seals, Los Angeles Kings, Philadelphia Flyers, Pittsburgh Penguins, Minnesota North Stars and St. Louis Blues started play.
16. The Buffalo Sabres and Vancouver Canucks started play.
17. The Atlanta Flames and New York Islanders started play.
18. The Kansas City Scouts and Washington Capitals started play.
19. The California Golden Seals relocated to Cleveland, Ohio, renamed Cleveland Barons. Kansas City Scouts relocated to Denver, Colorado, renamed Colorado Rockies.
20. The Cleveland Barons merged with the Minnesota North Stars.
21. The Edmonton Oilers, Hartford Whalers, Quebec Nordiques and Winnipeg Jets joined the NHL.
22. The Atlanta Flames relocated to Calgary, Alberta, renamed Calgary Flames.
23. The Colorado Rockies relocated to East Rutherford, New Jersey, renamed New Jersey Devils.
24. The San Jose Sharks started play.

== 1992–2017: Further expansion ==
In 1993, coinciding with the naming of Gary Bettman as commissioner, the league re-organized into the Eastern and Western Conferences, with two divisions each, organized along geographical lines. The playoff format was changed to provide conference champions without divisional playoff champions. A new round of expansion began. By 2000–01, the number of teams increased to 30 and the number of divisions increased to six. This era has seen three seasons changed due to labour disputes between the NHL and the players' union. The 1994–95 and 2012–13 seasons were shortened to 48 intraconference games, and the 2004–05 season's games were cancelled entirely. According to the 2011 NHL Guide and Record Book, the NHL includes the 2004–05 season in its count of seasons. For example, the 2011 NHL Guide lists the Tampa Bay Lightning as entering their 19th 'NHL Season', although a count of the Lightning's seasons of play would determine the 2010–11 season to be their 18th season of play.

No.	Season	Playoffs	Final	No. of teams	Reg. season games	Start (reg. season)	Finish (incl. playoffs)	Top record	Champion
76	1992–93	1993	1993	24^{[25]}	84	October 6	June 9	Pittsburgh Penguins (56–21–7)	Montreal Canadiens
77	1993–94	1994	1994	26^{[26]}	84	October 5	June 14	New York Rangers (52–24–8)	New York Rangers
78	1994–95	1995	1995	26	48^{[27]}	January 20	June 24	Detroit Red Wings (33–11–4)	New Jersey Devils
79	1995–96	1996	1996	26^{[28]}	82	October 6	June 10	Detroit Red Wings (62–13–7)	Colorado Avalanche
80	1996–97	1997	1997	26^{[29]}	82	October 4	June 7	Colorado Avalanche (49–24–9)	Detroit Red Wings
81	1997–98	1998	1998	26^{[30]}	82	October 1	June 16	Dallas Stars (49–22–11)	Detroit Red Wings
82	1998–99	1999	1999	27^{[31]}	82	October 9	June 19	Dallas Stars (51–19–12)	Dallas Stars
83	1999–00	2000	2000	28^{[32]}	82	October 1	June 10	St. Louis Blues (51–19–11–1)	New Jersey Devils
84	2000–01	2001	2001	30^{[33]}	82	October 4	June 9	Colorado Avalanche (52–16–10–4)	Colorado Avalanche
85	2001–02	2002	2002	30	82	October 3	June 13	Detroit Red Wings (51–17–10–4)	Detroit Red Wings
86	2002–03	2003	2003	30	82	October 9	June 9	Ottawa Senators (52–21–8–1)	New Jersey Devils
87	2003–04	2004	2004	30	82	October 8	June 7	Detroit Red Wings (48–21–11–2)	Tampa Bay Lightning
88	2004–05	Season not played due to lockout							
89	2005–06	2006	2006	30	82	October 5	June 19	Detroit Red Wings (58–16–8)	Carolina Hurricanes
90	2006–07	2007	2007	30^{[34]}	82	October 4	June 6	Buffalo Sabres (53–22–7)	Anaheim Ducks
91	2007–08	2008	2008	30	82	September 29	June 4	Detroit Red Wings (54–21–7)	Detroit Red Wings
92	2008–09	2009	2009	30	82	October 4	June 12	San Jose Sharks (53–18–11)	Pittsburgh Penguins
93	2009–10	2010	2010	30	82	October 1	June 9	Washington Capitals (54–15–13)	Chicago Blackhawks
94	2010–11	2011	2011	30	82	October 7	June 15	Vancouver Canucks (54–19–9)	Boston Bruins
95	2011–12	2012	2012	30^{[35]}	82	October 6	June 11	Vancouver Canucks (51–22–9)	Los Angeles Kings
96	2012–13	2013	2013	30	48^{[36]}	January 19	June 24	Chicago Blackhawks (36–7–5)	Chicago Blackhawks
97	2013–14	2014	2014	30^{[37]}	82	October 1	June 13	Boston Bruins (54–19–9)	Los Angeles Kings
98	2014–15	2015	2015	30^{[38]}	82	October 8	June 15	New York Rangers (53–22–7)	Chicago Blackhawks
99	2015–16	2016	2016	30	82	October 7	June 12	Washington Capitals (56–18–8)	Pittsburgh Penguins
100	2016–17	2017	2017	30	82	October 12	June 11	Washington Capitals (55–19–8)	Pittsburgh Penguins

Notes

25. The Ottawa Senators and Tampa Bay Lightning started play.
26. The Mighty Ducks of Anaheim and Florida Panthers started play. Minnesota North Stars relocated to Dallas, Texas, renamed Dallas Stars.
27. Season shortened due to lockout.
28. The Quebec Nordiques relocated to Denver, Colorado, renamed Colorado Avalanche.
29. The Winnipeg Jets cease operations, while their assets including their roster continue as the Phoenix Coyotes.
30. The Hartford Whalers relocated to Greensboro, North Carolina, renamed Carolina Hurricanes.
31. The Nashville Predators started play. The league realigned into 3 divisions per conference, ultimately with 5 teams per division.
32. The Atlanta Thrashers started play. The Carolina Hurricanes moved to their intended home of Raleigh, North Carolina.
33. The Columbus Blue Jackets and Minnesota Wild started play.
34. The Mighty Ducks of Anaheim rebranded as the Anaheim Ducks.
35. The Atlanta Thrashers relocated to Winnipeg, Manitoba, renamed and reactivated as the Winnipeg Jets.
36. Season shortened due to lockout. Last season to have 5 teams per division.
37. League realigned back into 2 divisions per conference, with 16 teams in the Eastern Conference (8 teams per division) and 14 in the Western Conference (7 teams per division).
38. The Phoenix Coyotes rebranded as the Arizona Coyotes.

== 2017–present: Current era ==
The league began its second century in 2017 and has continued to grow by adding two new expansion franchises. It has also seen one of its teams indefinitely suspend operations, with the team's hockey assets, including its roster and coaches, being transferred to a third expansion franchise.

This era has seen two seasons changed due to the COVID-19 pandemic. The 2019–20 season was stopped at 68–71 games due to the COVID-19 pandemic, and resulted in a one-time playoff format change involving 24 teams; the subsequent 2020–21 season was shortened to 56 intradivisional games, with teams temporarily realigned and the playoff format modified.

No.	Season	Playoffs	Final	No. of teams	Reg. season games	Start (reg. season)	Finish (incl. playoffs)	Top record	Champion
101	2017–18	2018	2018	31^{[39]}	82	October 4	June 7	Nashville Predators (53–18–11)	Washington Capitals
102	2018–19	2019	2019	31	82	October 3	June 12	Tampa Bay Lightning (62–16–4)	St. Louis Blues
103	2019–20	2020	2020	31	68–71^{[40]}	October 2	September 28	Boston Bruins (44–14–12)^{[40]}	Tampa Bay Lightning
104	2020–21	2021	2021	31	56^{[41]}	January 13	July 7	Colorado Avalanche (39–13–4)	Tampa Bay Lightning
105	2021–22	2022	2022	32^{[42]}	82	October 12	June 26	Florida Panthers (58–18–6)	Colorado Avalanche
106	2022–23	2023	2023	32	82	October 7	June 13	Boston Bruins (65–12–5)	Vegas Golden Knights
107	2023–24	2024	2024	32	82	October 10	June 24	New York Rangers (55–23–4)	Florida Panthers
108	2024–25	2025	2025	32^{[43]}	82	October 4	June 17	Winnipeg Jets (56–22–4)	Florida Panthers
109	2025–26	2026	2026	32	82	October 7	June 14	Colorado Avalanche (55–16–11)	Carolina Hurricanes
110	2026–27	2027	2027	32	84	September 29	TBD	TBD	TBD

Notes

39. The Vegas Golden Knights started play.
40. Season shortened due to the COVID-19 pandemic on March 12, 2020. Due to the uneven schedule, the Boston Bruins were awarded the top record in the regular season by points percentage.
41. Season shortened due to the COVID-19 pandemic. Due to cross border travel restrictions, the league temporarily realigned into 4 divisions, with the 7 Canadian teams in the North Division and the 24 American teams equally divided among the East, Central, and West Divisions.
42. The Seattle Kraken started play.
43. The Arizona Coyotes cease operations, while their assets including their roster continue as the Utah Mammoth.

== All-time top regular season record holders ==
This table lists the number of times that NHL/NHA teams had the top record in the regular season (this list does not count Stanley Cup/League Champion wins). The Presidents' Trophy is the current award for the team with the best regular season record, which began being awarded starting with the 1985–86 season. From 1938 to 1967 the Prince of Wales Trophy was the award for the team with the best record in the regular season. Following the expansion of 1967–68 no award was given until the inception of the Presidents' Trophy.

Total	Team	Most recent
23	Montreal Canadiens	1977–78
18	Detroit Red Wings	2007–08
14	Boston Bruins	2022–23
9	Ottawa Senators (original)	1927–28
6	Toronto Maple Leafs	1962–63
5	New York Rangers	2023–24
4	Colorado Avalanche	2025–26
4	Chicago Blackhawks	2012–13
3	Edmonton Oilers	1986–87
3	New York Islanders	1981–82
3	Philadelphia Flyers	1984–85
3	Washington Capitals	2016–17
2	Calgary Flames	1988–89
2	Dallas Stars	1998–99
2	Vancouver Canucks	2011–12
2	Quebec Bulldogs (NHA)	1912–13
1	Buffalo Sabres	2006–07
1	Florida Panthers	2021–22
1	Hamilton Tigers	1924–25
1	Montreal Wanderers (NHA)	1910
1	Nashville Predators	2017–18
1	Ottawa Senators	2002–03
1	Pittsburgh Penguins	1992–93
1	San Jose Sharks	2008–09
1	St. Louis Blues	1999–00
1	Tampa Bay Lightning	2018–19
1	Toronto Blueshirts (NHA)	1913–14
1	Winnipeg Jets	2024–25

Notes

Defunct teams denoted in italics.
The Montreal Canadiens and Ottawa Senators (original) each have 2 top regular season records in the NHA in addition to their NHL seasons.

== See also ==
- Timeline of the NHL
- List of Stanley Cup champions
- History of organizational changes in the NHL
- List of WHA seasons
