= Johnny Mowers =

Canadian ice hockey player

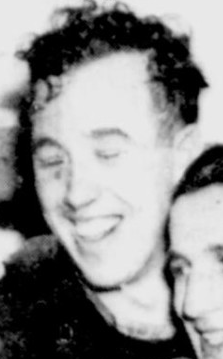
- Born: October 29, 1916 Niagara Falls, Ontario, Canada
- Died: December 7, 1995 (aged 79)
- Height: 5 ft 11 in (180 cm)
- Weight: 185 lb (84 kg; 13 st 3 lb)
- Position: Goaltender
- Caught: Left
- Played for: Detroit Red Wings
- Playing career: 1941–1948

John Thomas "Mum" Mowers (October 29, 1916 – December 7, 1995) was a Canadian ice hockey goaltender who played for the Detroit Red Wings of the National Hockey League (NHL) between 1940 and 1947. In 1943 he won the Vezina Trophy for allowing the fewest goals against in the NHL.

== Playing career ==
Mowers started his hockey career with the Niagara Falls of the OHA Senior A League. He had an excellent amateur career before playing with the Detroit Pontiacs of the MOHL and the Omaha Knights of the American Hockey Association.

His 1.93 goals against average with the Omaha Knights inspired Jack Adams to sign Mowers for the 1941 season with the Detroit Red Wings. Veteran Tiny Thompson was not playing up to expectations so Mowers was put in net instead. He was so impressive in his first season, that he almost won both the Vezina Trophy and the Calder Memorial Trophy, a feat that has only been accomplished by Frank Brimsek. He lost the Calder to Johnny Quilty and the Vezina to Turk Broda that season.

Next season, Mowers goals against average increased as the Detroit Red Wings plummeted to 5th place. He regained his skills in the playoffs leading the Red Wings all the way to the Stanley Cup Final against the Toronto Maple Leafs. The Red Wings won the first three games but the Leafs made a remarkable comeback winning the next four games. Mowers let in 19 goals in the four losses.

Despite the defeat, Mowers and the Red Wings won the Stanley Cup next season. Mowers was also awarded the Vezina Trophy for his efforts.

In 1943, he enlisted in the army and did not play again until 1947. When he came back he found his job lost to Harry Lumley. He appeared in two more games in 1948 with the Indianapolis Capitals before retiring.

== Awards and achievements ==
- Vezina Trophy Winner in 1943.
- Selected to the NHL First All-Star Team in 1943.
- Stanley Cup Championship in 1943.

== Career statistics ==
=== Regular season and playoffs ===
| | | | Regular season | | | | | | | | Playoffs |
| Season | Team | League | GP | W | L | T | Min | GA | SO | GAA | GP | W | L | T | Min | GA | SO | GAA |
|---|---|---|---|---|---|---|---|---|---|---|---|---|---|---|---|---|---|---|
| 1935–36 | Niagara Falls Cataracts | OHA-Sr. | — | — | — | — | — | — | — | — | — | — | — | — | — | — | — | — |
| 1935–36 | Niagara Falls Cataracts | A-Cup | — | — | — | — | — | — | — | — | 2 | 0 | 2 | 0 | 120 | 12 | 0 | 6.00 |
| 1936–37 | Niagara Falls Cataracts | OHA-Sr. | 18 | — | — | — | 1080 | 54 | 0 | 3.00 | 9 | — | — | — | 540 | 30 | 0 | 3.33 |
| 1937–38 | Niagara Falls Cataracts | OHA-Sr. | 16 | — | — | — | 960 | 50 | 0 | 3.12 | 7 | 7 | 0 | 0 | 420 | 16 | 0 | 2.29 |
| 1938–39 | Niagara Falls Cataracts | OHA-Sr. | 20 | — | — | — | 1200 | 63 | 4 | 3.15 | — | — | — | — | — | — | — | — |
| 1939–40 | Detroit Pontiacs | MOHL | 20 | — | — | — | 1200 | 84 | 0 | 4.20 | — | — | — | — | — | — | — | — |
| 1939–40 | Omaha Knights | AHA | 21 | 16 | 5 | 0 | 1272 | 41 | 3 | 1.93 | 9 | 4 | 5 | 0 | 610 | 21 | 1 | 2.07 |
| 1940–41 | Detroit Red Wings | NHL | 48 | 21 | 16 | 11 | 3040 | 102 | 4 | 2.01 | 9 | 4 | 5 | 0 | 561 | 20 | 0 | 2.14 |
| 1941–42 | Detroit Red Wings | NHL | 47 | 19 | 25 | 3 | 2880 | 144 | 5 | 3.00 | 12 | 7 | 5 | 0 | 720 | 38 | 0 | 3.17 |
| 1942–43 | Detroit Red Wings | NHL | 50 | 25 | 14 | 11 | 3010 | 124 | 6 | 2.47 | 10 | 8 | 2 | 0 | 679 | 22 | 2 | 1.94 |
| 1943–44 | Toronto RCAF | TNDHL | 9 | 3 | 6 | 0 | 540 | 53 | 0 | 5.89 | — | — | — | — | — | — | — | — |
| 1946–47 | Detroit Red Wings | NHL | 7 | 0 | 6 | 1 | 420 | 29 | 0 | 4.14 | 1 | 0 | 1 | 0 | 40 | 5 | 0 | 7.50 |
| 1947–48 | Indianapolis Capitals | AHL | 2 | 1 | 1 | 0 | 120 | 7 | 0 | 3.50 | — | — | — | — | — | — | — | — |
| NHL totals | | | 152 | 65 | 61 | 26 | 9350 | 399 | 15 | 2.56 | 32 | 19 | 13 | 0 | 2000 | 85 | 2 | 2.55 |

| Preceded by Frank Brimsek | Winner of the Vezina Trophy; 1943 | Succeeded by Bill Durnan |
