= 1942–43 NHL transactions =

The following is a list of all team-to-team transactions that have occurred in the National Hockey League (NHL) during the 1942–43 NHL season. It lists which team each player has been traded to and for which player(s) or other consideration(s), if applicable.

== Transactions ==
July 1, 1942	To Boston Bruins cash	To Chicago Black Hawks Phil Hergesheimer
August 15, 1942	To Boston Bruins cash	To Montreal Canadiens Dutch Hiller
September, 1942; Exact date unknown	To Boston Bruins loan of Murph Chamberlain for 1942-43 season	To Montreal Canadiens cash
October 4, 1942	To Toronto Maple Leafs $30,000 cash	To Montreal Canadiens Gordie Drillon
October 12, 1942	To Montreal Canadiens cash	To Chicago Black Hawks loan of Bert Gardiner
November 4, 1942	To Montreal Canadiens cash	To New York Rangers rights to Gus Mancuso
January 25, 1937	To Toronto Maple Leafs Babe Pratt	To New York Rangers Red Garrett; Hank Goldup
