= Les Douglas =

Canadian ice hockey player

- Born: December 5, 1918 Perth, Ontario, Canada
- Died: October 20, 2002 (aged 73) Kingston, Ontario, Canada
- Height: 5 ft 10 in (178 cm)
- Weight: 158 lb (72 kg; 11 st 4 lb)
- Position: Centre
- Shot: Left
- Played for: Detroit Red Wings
- Playing career: 1937–1956

Leslie Gordon Douglas (December 5, 1918 – October 20, 2002) was a Canadian professional ice hockey player who played 52 games in the National Hockey League with the Detroit Red Wings between 1940 and 1946. He won the Stanley Cup with Detroit in 1943. The rest of his career, which lasted from 1937 to 1956, was spent in various minor leagues. Douglas was born in Perth, Ontario.

== Career statistics ==
=== Regular season and playoffs ===
			Regular season					Playoffs
Season	Team	League	GP	G	A	Pts	PIM	GP	G	A	Pts	PIM
1934–35	Perth Crescents	OVHL	2	0	0	0	2	—	—	—	—	—
1934–35	Perth Juniors	LCJHL	—	—	—	—	—	—	—	—	—	—
1935–36	Perth Juniors	LCJHL	—	—	—	—	—	—	—	—	—	—
1936–37	Perth Juniors	LCJHL	12	21	19	40	10	2	3	4	7	0
1937–38	Perth Blue Wings	OVHL	8	18	16	34	10	2	3	4	7	0
1937–38	Perth Blue Wings	M-Cup	—	—	—	—	—	12	27	18	45	8
1938–39	Detroit Pontiacs	MOHL	27	27	20	47	25	7	5	4	9	13
1939–40	Indianapolis Capitals	IAHL	54	15	19	34	20	5	0	3	3	0
1940–41	Detroit Red Wings	NHL	18	1	2	3	2	—	—	—	—	—
1940–41	Indianapolis Capitals	AHL	31	3	5	8	4	—	—	—	—	—
1941–42	Indianapolis Capitals	AHL	56	15	33	48	9	10	8	9	17	6
1942–43	Detroit Red Wings	NHL	21	5	8	13	4	10	3	2	5	2
1942–43	Indianapolis Capitals	AHL	33	13	26	39	7	1	1	0	1	0
1943–44	Toronto Maher Jewelers	TIHL	8	4	6	10	2	—	—	—	—	—
1943–44	Toronto RCAF	TNDHL	2	4	2	6	0	—	—	—	—	—
1943–44	Ottawa Commanders	QSHL	—	—	—	—	—	3	3	0	3	0
1944–45	Toronto Auto Workers	TMHL	13	9	25	34	4	3	0	0	)	0
1944–45	Toronto Orphans	TMHL	—	—	—	—	—	1	1	2	3	0
1945–46	Detroit Red Wings	NHL	1	0	0	0	0	—	—	—	—	—
1945–46	Indianapolis Capitals	AHL	62	44	46	90	35	5	1	2	3	2
1946–47	Detroit Red Wings	NHL	12	0	2	2	2	—	—	—	—	—
1946–47	Indianapolis Capitals	AHL	51	26	57	83	26	—	—	—	—	—
1947–48	Buffalo Bisons	AHL	68	27	50	77	23	8	2	3	5	0
1948–49	Buffalo Bisons	AHL	68	20	52	72	20	—	—	—	—	—
1949–50	Cleveland Barons	AHL	67	32	68	100	27	9	2	2	4	11
1950–51	Cleveland Barons	AHL	70	31	39	70	20	11	3	4	7	0
1951–52	Montreal Royals	QSHL	60	30	50	80	20	7	3	7	10	2
1951–52	Buffalo Bisons	AHL	—	—	—	—	—	1	0	1	1	0
1952–53	Montreal Royals	QSHL	55	19	29	48	8	14	5	3	8	4
1953–54	Sarnia Sailors	OHA Sr	22	8	15	23	6	—	—	—	—	—
1954–55	Kingston Goodyears	OHA Int	—	—	—	—	—	—	—	—	—	—
1955–56	Kingston Goodyears	OHA Int	27	8	12	20	52	1	0	0	0	0
IAHL/AHL totals			560	226	395	621	191	50	17	24	41	19
NHL totals			52	6	12	18	8	10	3	2	5	2
