= Frank Brimsek =

American ice hockey player (1913–1998)

- Hockey Hall of Fame, 1966
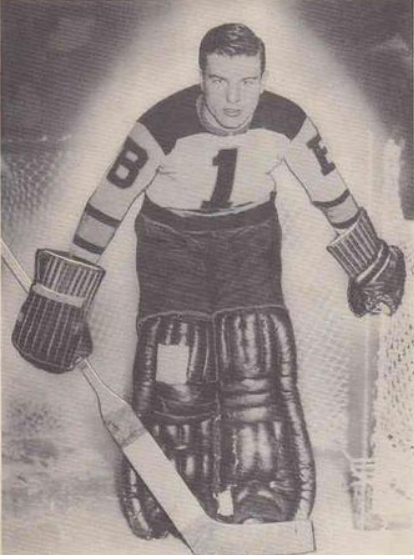
- Brimsek with the Boston Bruins in 1939
- Born: September 26, 1913 Eveleth, Minnesota, U.S.
- Died: November 11, 1998 (aged 85) Virginia, Minnesota, U.S.
- Height: 5 ft 9 in (175 cm)
- Weight: 170 lb (77 kg; 12 st 2 lb)
- Position: Goaltender
- Caught: Left
- Played for: Boston Bruins; Chicago Black Hawks
- Playing career: 1938–1950

Francis Charles "Mr. Zero" Brimsek (September 26, 1913 – November 11, 1998) was an American professional ice hockey player. He was a goaltender for ten seasons in the National Hockey League (NHL) for the Boston Bruins and Chicago Black Hawks. He won the Calder Memorial Trophy as a rookie and the Vezina Trophy twice, and he was named to the NHL All-Star team eight times (twice on the First Team and six times on the Second Team). He was also a member of two Stanley Cup championships (1939 and 1941). At the time of his retirement in 1950, he held the records for most wins and shutouts recorded by an American goaltender; these records stood for 54 years and 61 years respectively. In 1966, he was inducted into the Hockey Hall of Fame, the first American goalie to be inducted and in 1973, he was part of the inaugural class of the United States Hockey Hall of Fame. In 1998, Brimsek was ranked 67 on The Hockey News' list of the 100 Greatest Hockey Players, the highest ranked American goaltender.

== Background ==
Brimsek was born in Eveleth, Minnesota, on September 26, 1913. His parents were of Slovene descent. The town of Eveleth produced at that time four other hockey players who would play in the National Hockey League (NHL): Mike Karakas, Sam LoPresti, Al Suomi and John Mariucci. Brimsek and Karakas played on the same baseball team in high school. Brimsek first started playing hockey when his brother, John, the second-string goalie on the Eveleth High School team, switched to defense, and Frank replaced him in the net. Soon, Brimsek found himself spending most of his spare time playing hockey. Unlike most of his friends who wanted to be high-scoring forwards, Brimsek never showed any desire to play any other position than goalie. Just before every winter, Brimsek and his friends would get on a dry lot and they would practice shooting at him. After graduating from high school, Brimsek played for the St. Cloud State Teachers College hockey team. He also graduated from college with a machine shop student's degree.

== Playing career ==
=== Early career ===
In the fall of 1934, Brimsek was invited to the Detroit Red Wings training camp for a shot at playing in the National Hockey League (NHL). Jack Adams, the Red Wings' coach and manager, made a bad impression on Brimsek, who felt that Adams had a habit of favoritism. This led him to try out for another professional team, the Baltimore Orioles of the Eastern Amateur Hockey League (EAHL). Unfortunately, the Orioles cut him, and Brimsek hitchhiked back to Eveleth. On his way back home, he had a chance meeting with the owner of the Pittsburgh Yellow Jackets, John H. Harris. The Yellow Jackets were in need of a goaltender and Harris signed Brimsek to the team. Brimsek started playing for the Yellow Jackets in sixteen exhibition games in 1934–35; he won fourteen of them.

The next season, the Yellow Jackets joined the EAHL. Brimsek finished with twenty wins and eight shutouts, the most by any goalie in the league. He was named to the league's second All-Star team and awarded the George L. Davis Trophy for the lowest goals against average (GAA). Impressed by Brimsek, Harris wanted to protect his interests in the goalie so he had the Red Wings put Brimsek on their protected list. Harris then tried to get the Red Wings to call Brimsek up. However, the Red Wings wanted Brimsek to first play one year for their amateur team in Pontiac, but Brimsek turned down the offer, choosing to stay with the Yellow Jackets instead. Harris then shopped Brimsek around the NHL until he was accepted by the Boston Bruins in October 1937. The Bruins were already well established in net with future hall-of-famer Tiny Thompson, so Brimsek was assigned to the Providence Reds of the International-American Hockey League (IAHL) for the 1937–38 season. In his only full season with the Reds, Brimsek helped his team win the Calder Cup and he was named to the league's first All-Star team.

=== Boston Bruins ===
==== Pre World War II ====
"The kid had the fastest hands I ever saw - like lightning.”

— Head coach Art Ross commentating on Brimsek's ability in 1938.

Brimsek started the 1938–39 season with the Reds, but he would not stay long with them. During an NHL exhibition game, Thompson got injured and it was unlikely that he would recuperate in time for the beginning of the regular season, so the Bruins called up Brimsek. In his NHL debut, Brimsek helped his new team defeat the Toronto Maple Leafs 3–2. He played another game, a 4–1 victory against the Red Wings, before being sent back down to the Reds after Thompson recovered. Art Ross, the Bruins' coach and general manager, had seen enough of Brimsek to consider promoting Brimsek to starting goalie with the Bruins. Thompson was traded to the Detroit Red Wings for goaltender Normie Smith and $15,000.00 U.S. cash on November 16, 1938, and Ross brought Brimsek back from Providence. This did not sit well with Bruins fans as Thompson was a favorite and had won the Vezina Trophy.

On December 1, 1938, in Brimsek's first game as the starting goalie, his team fell 2–0 to the Montreal Canadiens in Montreal. On that same night, Thompson won his first game with the Red Wings. Also, Brimsek wore red hockey pants instead of the team's colors, and he was wearing Thompson's former jersey number 1. These details did not improve his image with the fans. Brimsek fared better in the next game as he shut out the Chicago Black Hawks. After shutting out his opponents for the second straight game, the fans warmed up to him immediately. Brimsek went on to earn six shutouts in his first seven games, and the fans and the media began to call him "Mr. Zero". During that seven game span, he also set the NHL record for the longest shutout streak, 231 minutes and 54 seconds. At the end of the regular season, Brimsek had backstopped the Bruins to a first-place finish in the league, and he recorded the most wins (33), the most shutouts (10) and the lowest GAA (1.56) in the league. In the playoffs, Brimsek and his team defeated the New York Rangers in the semi-finals and the Maple Leafs in the 1939 Stanley Cup Final. He also won the Calder Memorial Trophy and the Vezina Trophy, and he was named to the NHL first All-Star team.

In 1939-40, Brimsek finished first in the league in wins again and he was named to the NHL second All-Star team. This was the first of six berths on the second All-Star team. The Bruins were eliminated in the playoffs by the New York Rangers in the semi-finals. In 1940–41, Brimsek backstopped the Bruins to their third consecutive first-place finish in the league. The Bruins defeated the Red Wings in the 1941 Stanley Cup Final four games to none, and Brimsek had his second Stanley Cup victory. For his efforts during the regular season, Brimsek was named to the NHL second All-Star team for the second year in a row. Continuing on the previous season's success, Brimsek won the Vezina Trophy and was named to the NHL first All-Star team for the second time in his career. However, Brimsek's team could not replicate their playoff success as they were eliminated by the Red Wings in the semi-finals.

==== World War II and aftermath ====
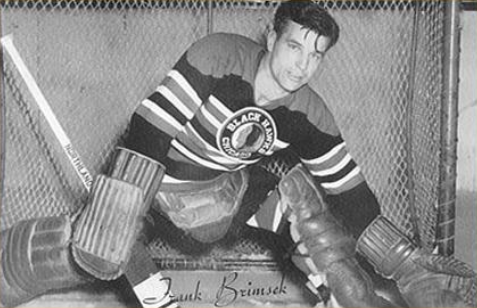
1950s card of Brimsek for Chicago Black Hawks

With the outbreak of World War II, three of the Bruins' best forwards – center Milt Schmidt, left wing Woody Dumart, and right winger Bobby Bauer – joined the Royal Canadian Air Force midway through the 1941–42 season. Despite their absence, the Bruins made it to the Stanley Cup Final the next season. In the finals, they were defeated by the Red Wings four games to none. Due to his play in the regular season, Brimsek was again named to the NHL second All-Star team. However, it was popular opinion at the time that Brimsek deserved the spot on the first All-Star team over Johnny Mowers, including Mowers' own coach and general manager, Jack Adams.

The next season, Brimsek decided to help the war effort by joining the United States Coast Guard. During his time with the Coast Guard, he played with the Coast Guard Cutters hockey team in Curtis Bay, Maryland, and later served in the South Pacific. While in the Coast Guard, he achieved the rank Motor Machinists Mate 2nd Class Petty Officer. After the war ended, Brimsek returned to the Bruins in time for the 1945–46 season. However, Brimsek was not as sharp as he was before due to having not played any professional hockey for two years. In his first season back, Brimsek guided the Bruins to the finals against the Montreal Canadiens. The Bruins were defeated in five games, three of which went to overtime. Brimsek was applauded for his performance in the playoffs, compensating for his team's weak defence. This marked Brimsek's fourth appearance in the finals and it would be his last. Brimsek was also named to the NHL second All-Star team for the fifth time in his career.

Brimsek remained with the Bruins for three more seasons. He was named to the NHL second All-Star team twice more and was selected to play in the inaugural NHL All-Star Game in 1947. The Bruins made the playoffs all three seasons but were eliminated in the semi-finals every time. Brimsek was also a finalist for the Hart Trophy in 1947–48, finishing behind Buddy O'Connor of the Rangers. Personal problems plagued Brimsek during his final years in Boston. His ten-month-old son had died in January 1949, and his coach and longtime teammate, Dit Clapper, had resigned from his coaching duties. It did not also help that the Boston crowd would occasionally boo Brimsek for his play. After the 1948–49 season, Brimsek requested a trade from Boston to Chicago in order to be closer to home, and to the new blueprint business he had started there. Boston granted his request and he was traded to the Chicago Black Hawks in exchange for cash.

Brimsek's 32 career playoff wins for Boston was the team record until surpassed by Gerry Cheevers in 1977. Brimsek presently ranks fourth in team history as of 2021. His 230 regular-season wins puts him in third place in Bruins' history as of 2021.

Brimsek played one season with the Black Hawks, recording 22 wins, 38 losses and 10 ties in 70 games. The Hawks finished last in the standings. It was the only season when Brimsek's team did not make the playoffs. He retired at the conclusion of the season.

== Retirement and legacy ==
Brimsek played a stand-up style of goaltending, in which a goalie usually stays on his feet instead of dropping down on his knees to make a save. Brimsek is also remembered for having a quick catching hand and for "taking the feet out" of opposing players that were being a nuisance in front of his net. After retiring, Brimsek returned to Minnesota and worked as a railroad engineer, living a quiet life while spending time in nature. Even after his playing days, Brimsek regularly received fan mail. In 1966, he was inducted into the Hockey Hall of Fame, the first American-born goalie to be so honoured, and in 1973 he was an inaugural inductee of the United States Hockey Hall of Fame. He was also inducted into the Minnesota sports Hall of Fame in 1988. Brimsek died on November 11, 1998, in Virginia, Minnesota, leaving behind his wife, Peggy, his two daughters, Chris and Karen, and his five grandchildren.

In 1998, Brimsek was ranked 67 on The Hockey News' list of the 100 Greatest Hockey Players, and was the highest ranked American goaltender. An annual award, to the top high school goaltender in Minnesota, is given in Brimsek's honor. Brimsek's 252 wins and 40 shutouts each stood for a long time as the most ever recorded by an American netminder. His wins record was finally broken by Tom Barrasso on February 15, 1994, and his shutouts record has only been equaled by John Vanbiesbrouck and Jonathan Quick. Brimsek's 35 shutouts with Boston places him third on that team's career list behind only Tiny Thompson and Tuukka Rask. Also, Brimsek's eight berths on the NHL All-Star team are the second most among goalies in history, behind only Glenn Hall with ten.

In 2023 he was named one of the top 100 best Bruins players of all time. He was later named to their All-Centennial team.

== Career statistics ==
=== Regular season and playoffs ===
			Regular season								Playoffs
Season	Team	League	GP	W	L	T	Min	GA	SO	GAA	GP	W	L	T	Min	GA	SO	GAA
1931–32	Eveleth-Gilbert High School	USHS-MN	—	—	—	—	—	—	—	—	—	—	—	—	—	—	—	—
1932–33	Eveleth Junior College	Independent	—	—	—	—	—	—	—	—	—	—	—	—	—	—	—	—
1933–34	St. Cloud State Teachers College	Intercollegiate	—	—	—	—	—	—	—	—	—	—	—	—	—	—	—	—
1934–35	Pittsburgh Yellow Jackets	Exhibition	16	14	2	0	960	39	1	2.44	—	—	—	—	—	—	—	—
1935–36	Pittsburgh Yellow Jackets	EAHL	38	20	16	2	2280	74	8	1.95	8	4	3	1	480	19	2	2.36
1936–37	Pittsburgh Yellow Jackets	EAHL	47	19	23	5	2820	142	3	3.02	—	—	—	—	—	—	—	—
1937–38	Providence Reds	IAHL	48	25	16	7	2950	86	5	1.75	7	5	2	0	515	16	0	1.86
1938–39	Providence Reds	IAHL	9	5	2	2	570	18	0	1.89	—	—	—	—	—	—	—	—
1938–39	Boston Bruins	NHL	43	33	9	1	2610	68	10	1.56	12	8	4	—	863	18	1	1.25
1939–40	Boston Bruins	NHL	48	31	12	5	2950	98	6	1.99	6	2	4	—	360	15	0	2.50
1940–41	Boston Bruins	NHL	48	27	8	13	3040	102	6	2.01	11	8	3	—	678	23	1	2.04
1941–42	Boston Bruins	NHL	47	24	17	6	2930	115	3	2.35	5	2	3	—	307	16	0	3.13
1942–43	Boston Bruins	NHL	50	24	17	9	3000	176	1	3.52	9	4	5	—	560	33	0	3.54
1943–44	Coast Guard Cutters	EAHL	27	19	6	2	1620	83	1	3.07	5	4	0	—	300	4	1	0.80
1945–46	Boston Bruins	NHL	34	16	14	4	2040	111	2	3.26	10	5	5	—	651	29	0	2.67
1946–47	Boston Bruins	NHL	60	26	23	11	3600	175	3	2.92	5	1	4	—	343	16	0	2.80
1947–48	Boston Bruins	NHL	60	23	24	13	3600	168	3	2.80	5	1	4	—	317	20	0	3.79
1948–49	Boston Bruins	NHL	54	26	20	8	3240	147	1	2.72	5	1	4	—	316	16	0	3.04
1949–50	Chicago Black Hawks	NHL	70	22	38	10	4200	244	5	3.49	—	—	—	—	—	—	—	—
NHL totals			514	252	182	80	31,210	1404	40	2.70	68	32	36	—	4395	186	2	2.54

== Awards ==
EAHL

Award	Year(s)
EAHL second All-Star team	1936
George L. Davis Trophy	1936

IAHL

Award	Year(s)
IAHL first All-Star team	1938
Calder Cup	1938

NHL

Award	Year(s)
Calder Memorial Trophy	1939
NHL All-Star Game	1947, 1948
NHL first All-Star team	1939, 1942
NHL second All-Star team	1940, 1941, 1943, 1946, 1947, 1948
Stanley Cup	1939, 1941
Vezina Trophy	1939, 1942

Boston Bruins

Award	Year(s)
Elizabeth C. Dufresne Trophy	1943, 1948
Boston Bruins All Centennial Team	2024
Named of the top 100 best Bruins players of all time	2023

Awards and achievements
Preceded by Cully Dahlstrom	Winner of the Calder Memorial Trophy; 1939	Succeeded by Kilby MacDonald
Preceded by Cecil Thompson	Winner of the Vezina Trophy; 1939	Succeeded by David Kerr
Preceded by Turk Broda	Winner of the Vezina Trophy; 1942	Succeeded by Johnny Mowers
