= 1940–41 NHL transactions =

The following is a list of all team-to-team transactions that have occurred in the National Hockey League (NHL) during the 1940–41 NHL season. It lists which team each player has been traded to and for which player(s) or other consideration(s), if applicable.

== Transactions ==
May 10, 1940	To Toronto Maple Leafs cash	To Chicago Black Hawks Pep Kelly
May 10, 1940	To Toronto Maple Leafs $7,500 cash	To Montreal Canadiens Murph Chamberlain
May 11, 1940	To Montreal Canadiens Bill MacKenzie	To Chicago Black Hawks cash
June 7, 1940	To Toronto Maple Leafs rights to Frank Eddolls	To Montreal Canadiens rights to Joe Benoit
November 19, 1940	To Montreal Canadiens Jack Portland	To Chicago Black Hawks $12,500 cash
January 17, 1941	To Toronto Maple Leafs Jack Howard loan of Peanuts O'Flaherty	To New York Americans Clarence Drouillard
