= Hank Goldup =

Canadian ice hockey player (1918-2008)

- Born: October 29, 1918 Kingston, Ontario, Canada
- Died: December 14, 2008 (aged 90) Mississauga, Ontario, Canada
- Height: 5 ft 11 in (180 cm)
- Weight: 175 lb (79 kg; 12 st 7 lb)
- Position: Left wing
- Shot: Left
- Played for: Toronto Maple Leafs; New York Rangers
- Playing career: 1939–1949

Henry George Goldup (October 29, 1918 – December 14, 2008) was a Canadian professional ice hockey player who played 202 games in the National Hockey League (NHL) with the Toronto Maple Leafs and New York Rangers between 1939 and 1945. He won the Stanley Cup in 1942 with Toronto. His son Glenn Goldup also played in the NHL.

== Personal life ==
Born in 1918 in Kingston, Ontario, Goldup had a brother Fred and a sister Florence. He had, along with his wife Margaret eight children: Ted, Barbara, Carolyn, Donna, Glenn, Paul, Susan and Tracey. After retiring from hockey, Goldup took up a career in sales, with Molson Breweries, Jordan Wines and Victoriaville hockey sticks. He continued playing golf until he was 85 and he participated in Christmas charities and coaching. At the time of his death, he had eleven grandchildren and six great-grandchildren. He lived in Mississauga, Ontario at the time of his death, living in the Village at Erin Meadows senior's care facility after suffering a stroke in 2002.

== Playing career ==
Goldup played junior hockey with the local Kingston Dunlop Forts in 1935–36 before moving to Toronto where he played two seasons, for North Vocational and the Toronto Marlboros. He played one season with the Toronto Goodyears senior team before turning professional with the Toronto Maple Leafs organization in 1939. He split his first season with the Maple Leafs and the Pittsburgh Hornets of the American Hockey League (AHL). He played the 1940–41 and 1941–42 seasons with the Maple Leafs and was a member of the 1942 Stanley Cup winning team. This was the team that came back from three games down to win the Stanley Cup against the Detroit Red Wings. He was traded in 1942 to the New York Rangers and joined the Canadian army in 1943, returning to the Rangers in 1944–45, his final full season in the NHL. He split the next season between the Rangers and their AHL affiliate New Haven. In June 1946, he was traded to the Red Wings, but the trade was nullified when Flash Hollett retired instead of accepting the trade. Goldup was later transferred to the Cleveland Barons of the AHL, playing a full season in 1946–47. He broke his leg severely and required a brace on it for two years. He did not play the following season, but after a tryout with the Washington Lions, he did return to competitive hockey in the amateur senior leagues with Shawinigan, Quebec and Fenelon Falls, Ontario before giving up hockey in 1949.

Goldup was inducted into the Kingston Sports Hall of Fame and the Etobicoke Sports Hall of Fame.

== Career statistics ==
=== Regular season and playoffs ===
| | | | Regular season | | | | | Playoffs |
| Season | Team | League | GP | G | A | Pts | PIM | GP | G | A | Pts | PIM |
|---|---|---|---|---|---|---|---|---|---|---|---|---|
| 1935–36 | Kingston Dunlop Forts | KCHL | 16 | 29 | 14 | 43 | — | — | — | — | — | — |
| 1936–37 | Northern Vocational | OHA-B | — | — | — | — | — | — | — | — | — | — |
| 1937–38 | Toronto Marlboros | OHA | 14 | 25 | 16 | 41 | 12 | 6 | 6 | 4 | 10 | 4 |
| 1938–39 | Toronto Goodyears | OHA Sr | 16 | 18 | 11 | 29 | 18 | 3 | 1 | 0 | 1 | 0 |
| 1938–39 | Toronto Goodyears | Al-Cup | — | — | — | — | — | 10 | 5 | 9 | 14 | 12 |
| 1939–40 | Toronto Maple Leafs | NHL | 21 | 6 | 4 | 10 | 2 | 10 | 5 | 1 | 6 | 4 |
| 1939–40 | Pittsburgh Hornets | AHL | 17 | 12 | 12 | 24 | 4 | — | — | — | — | — |
| 1940–41 | Toronto Maple Leafs | NHL | 26 | 10 | 5 | 15 | 9 | 7 | 0 | 0 | 0 | 0 |
| 1941–42 | Toronto Maple Leafs | NHL | 44 | 12 | 18 | 30 | 13 | 9 | 0 | 0 | 0 | 2 |
| 1942–43 | Toronto Maple Leafs | NHL | 9 | 1 | 7 | 8 | 4 | — | — | — | — | — |
| 1942–43 | New York Rangers | NHL | 36 | 11 | 20 | 31 | 33 | — | — | — | — | — |
| 1943–44 | Toronto Army Daggers | OHA Sr | 1 | 1 | 0 | 1 | 7 | — | — | — | — | — |
| 1943–44 | Toronto Army Shamrocks | TIHL | 13 | 7 | 9 | 16 | 36 | 4 | 6 | 4 | 10 | 6 |
| 1944–45 | New York Rangers | NHL | 48 | 17 | 25 | 42 | 25 | — | — | — | — | — |
| 1945–46 | New York Rangers | NHL | 19 | 6 | 1 | 7 | 11 | — | — | — | — | — |
| 1945–46 | New Haven Eagles | AHL | 25 | 13 | 11 | 24 | 7 | — | — | — | — | — |
| 1946–47 | Cleveland Barons | AHL | 61 | 30 | 19 | 49 | 22 | 4 | 0 | 1 | 1 | 0 |
| 1948–49 | Washington Lions | AHL | 7 | 0 | 0 | 0 | 2 | — | — | — | — | — |
| 1948–49 | Shawinigan Falls Cataractes | QSHL | 3 | 0 | 3 | 3 | 0 | — | — | — | — | — |
| 1948–49 | Fenelon Falls Generals | OHA Int | — | — | — | — | — | — | — | — | — | — |
| NHL totals | | | 202 | 63 | 80 | 143 | 97 | 26 | 5 | 1 | 6 | 6 |

== Transactions ==
- November 27, 1942 - Traded to New York Rangers (NHL) by Toronto Maple Leafs (NHL) with Red Garrett for Babe Pratt.
- June 19, 1946 - Traded to Detroit Red Wings (NHL) by New York Rangers with Ab DeMarco for Flash Hollett. Transaction voided when Hollett decided to retire.
- October 4, 1946 - Traded to Cleveland (AHL) by New York Rangers for cash.

Source: "Player Card: Hank Goldup". NHL.

== Awards ==
- 1995 - Etobicoke Sports Hall of Fame
- 2005 - Kingston and District Sports Hall of Fame
