= Jimmy Orlando =

Canadian ice hockey player

- Jimmy Orlando, Detroit Red Wings
- Born: February 27, 1916 Montreal, Quebec, Canada
- Died: October 24, 1992 (aged 76)
- Height: 5 ft 11 in (180 cm)
- Weight: 185 lb (84 kg; 13 st 3 lb)
- Position: Defence
- Shot: Left
- Played for: Detroit Red Wings
- Playing career: 1935–1951

James Vincent Orlando (February 27, 1916 – October 24, 1992) was a Canadian ice hockey player who played 199 games in the National Hockey League with the Detroit Red Wings between 1937 and 1943.

== Playing career ==
Jimmy Orlando was an enforcer throughout his NHL career. He averaged over 80 PIM's per season, twice posting 99 penalty minutes in a single season in 1941, and again in 1943. He posted 111 Penalty minutes in 1942. He helped the Detroit Red Wings win the Stanley Cup in 1937 and 1943. After missing 2 years of hockey while fighting in World War II, he returned to Canada and played in the Quebec Senior Hockey League from 1945 to 1951. Orlando retired from hockey after the 1951 season.

When Orlando, then known as "the bad man on ice," was arrested by the FBI in 1944, for claiming to be in an essential war effort job and after being bailed out by the Wings president, he promptly jumped bail, returning to Canada. He then joined the Canadian Army but was thereafter a wanted man in the US, effectively ending his NHL career. Several legal appeals failed to change anything for Jimmy, so he became the manager of the El Morocco nightclub in Montreal, working for owner Eddie Quinn, the wrestling czar.

An iconic photo exists of a blood-soaked Orlando playing through a head wound.

Orlando was also described by legendary Montreal sports writer Mike Farber story as being the spectator who rushed to the aid of NHL hockey commissioner Clarence Campbell when attacked at the Montreal Forum at the start of the Rocket Richard Riot. Orlando was described as having knocked the assailant's teeth out "like Chicklets."

It was at the El Morocco that Orlando met Lili St. Cyr, then on her way to becoming the most famous burlesque dancer of all time. Quinn was Lili's sugar-daddy but had Orlando act as a beard when Quinn was around. One of the great romances of the century soon followed lasting for many years, in amongst Lili's six marriages and Jimmy's dalliances. Orlando played with several of the Quebec Senior Hockey League teams up until 1951.

Orlando went on to own several of his own night spots which were favorite hangouts for Montreal jazz musicians & gangsters. Jimmy also refereed big-time wrestling matches at the Montreal Forum.

== Career statistics ==
=== Regular season and playoffs ===
			Regular season					Playoffs
Season	Team	League	GP	G	A	Pts	PIM	GP	G	A	Pts	PIM
1932–33	Montreal Victorias	MMJHL	11	2	0	2	33	—	—	—	—	—
1933–34	Montreal Victorias	MMJHL	8	0	4	4	44	2	0	0	0	8
1933–34	Montreal Victorias	MCHL	1	0	0	0	0	—	—	—	—	—
1934–35	Montreal Victorias	MMJHL	2	3	2	5	8	—	—	—	—	—
1934–35	Montreal Victorias	MCHL	7	0	0	0	18	—	—	—	—	—
1935–36	Rochester Cardinals	IHL	12	0	0	0	18	—	—	—	—	—
1935–36	Montreal Senior Canadiens	MCHL	19	1	6	7	49	—	—	—	—	—
1936–37	Detroit Red Wings	NHL	9	0	1	1	8	—	—	—	—	—
1936–37	Pittsburgh Hornets	IAHL	38	0	5	5	61	5	0	0	0	5
1937–38	Detroit Red Wings	NHL	6	0	0	0	4	—	—	—	—	—
1937–38	Pittsburgh Hornets	IAHL	45	0	7	7	82	2	0	0	0	0
1938–39	Springfield Indians	IAHL	54	7	9	16	106	3	0	0	0	8
1939–40	Detroit Red Wings	NHL	48	1	3	4	54	5	0	0	0	15
1940–41	Detroit Red Wings	NHL	48	1	10	11	99	9	0	2	2	31
1941–42	Detroit Red Wings	NHL	48	1	7	8	141	12	0	4	4	45
1942–43	Detroit Red Wings	NHL	40	3	4	7	109	10	0	3	3	14
1945–46	Valleyfield Braves	QSHL	40	3	19	22	52	—	—	—	—	—
1945–46	Ottawa Senators	QSHL	—	—	—	—	—	9	1	3	4	22
1946–47	Valleyfield Braves	QSHL	35	5	8	13	69	—	—	—	—	—
1947–48	Montreal Royals	QSHL	39	3	14	17	124	3	0	0	0	4
1948–49	Montreal Royals	QSHL	45	3	20	23	164	8	2	1	3	18
1949–50	Montreal Royals	QSHL	1	0	0	0	0	—	—	—	—	—
1949–50	Valleyfield Braves	QSHL	30	2	11	13	52	5	0	1	1	24
1950–51	Valleyfield Braves	QSHL	53	1	11	12	107	16	0	6	6	24
QSHL totals			243	17	83	100	568	41	3	11	14	92
NHL totals			199	6	25	31	415	36	0	9	9	105

== Awards and achievements ==
- 1948, 1949 QSHL First All-Star Team
- 1937 and 1943 Stanley Cup Championship (Detroit)
- 1939 IAHL Second All-Star Team
