= Johnny Quilty =

Canadian ice hockey player (1921-1969)

- Born: January 21, 1921 Ottawa, Ontario, Canada
- Died: September 12, 1969 (aged 48) Ottawa, Ontario, Canada
- Height: 6 ft 0 in (183 cm)
- Weight: 180 lb (82 kg; 12 st 12 lb)
- Position: Center
- Shot: Left
- Played for: Boston Bruins; Montreal Canadiens
- Playing career: 1940–1952

John Francis Quilty (January 21, 1921 – September 12, 1969) was a Canadian professional ice hockey centre. He played 125 games in the National Hockey League (NHL) playing for the Montreal Canadiens and Boston Bruins. He was awarded the Calder Memorial Trophy in 1941, as the rookie of the year in the NHL. He was the son of Silver Quilty.

== Biography ==
Quilty was born in Ottawa, Ontario. He played junior hockey with Glebe Collegiate and the Ottawa St. Pats of the Ottawa City Hockey League. He became a professional with the Montreal Canadiens in 1940-41. Quilty recorded 34 points in 48 games and was awarded the Calder Memorial Trophy. After two seasons with the Canadiens, he joined the Royal Canadian Air Force where he kept active in hockey playing on RCAF teams in Toronto and Vancouver. In 1946-47, Quilty returned with the Canadiens. He played three games with the Canadiens while also playing in the American Hockey League with the Springfield Indians and the Buffalo Bisons. Quilty played part of the 1947-48 season with the Canadiens before being traded to the Boston Bruins. He suffered a compound fracture of his leg after six games with Boston and did not return to the NHL again.

Quilty played senior hockey for one season afterward for the North Sydney Victorias. In 1949-50, he joined the Ottawa RCAF Flyers for two seasons before joining the Ottawa Senators in the Quebec Senior Hockey League. Quilty would remain with the Senators until 1951-52 when he signed on with the Renfrew Millionaires of the East Coast Senior Hockey League. He was named the MVP of the ECSHL that year before retiring.

Quilty grew up watching the original Ottawa Senators play at home, was the light-heavyweight boxing champion of the Ottawa Valley in 1939. He was the son of Silver Quilty, a past president of the Canadian Amateur Hockey Association, and Canadian Football Hall of Fame inductee.

Quilty died suddenly at his home in Ottawa on September 12, 1969, at age of 48. He was posthumously inducted into the Ottawa Sports Hall of Fame.

== Awards and achievements ==
- Calder Memorial Trophy winner in 1941.
- Selected as ECSHL MVP in 1952.
- Inducted into the Ottawa Sports Hall of Fame in 1991.

== Career statistics ==
			Regular season					Playoffs
Season	Team	League	GP	G	A	Pts	PIM	GP	G	A	Pts	PIM
1936–37	Glebe Collegiate	High-ON	—	—	—	—	—	—	—	—	—	—
1937–38	Ottawa St. Pats	OCJHL	—	—	—	—	—	—	—	—	—	—
1938–39	Ottawa St. Pats	OCJHL	—	—	—	—	—	—	—	—	—	—
1938–39	Ottawa St. Pats	M-Cup	—	—	—	—	—	5	11	5	16	0
1939–40	Ottawa St. Pats	OCJHL	—	—	—	—	—	—	—	—	—	—
1940–41	Montreal Canadiens	NHL	48	18	16	34	31	3	0	2	2	0
1941–42	Montreal Canadiens	NHL	48	12	12	24	44	3	0	1	1	0
1942–43	Toronto RCAF	OHA-Sr.	9	6	9	15	12	—	—	—	—	—
1943–44	Vancouver RCAF	NNDHL	14	12	14	26	8	3	1	2	3	2
1945–46	Ottawa Senators	QSHL	2	0	0	0	0	3	1	0	1	0
1946–47	Montreal Canadiens	NHL	3	1	1	2	0	7	3	2	5	9
1946–47	Buffalo Bisons	AHL	5	0	2	2	2	—	—	—	—	—
1946–47	Springfield Indians	AHL	46	17	15	32	36	2	0	0	0	0
1947–48	Montreal Canadiens	NHL	20	3	2	5	4	—	—	—	—	—
1947–48	Boston Bruins	NHL	6	3	2	5	2	—	—	—	—	—
1948–49	North Sydney Victorias	CBSHL	31	5	15	20	18	6	2	3	5	0
1949–50	Ottawa RCAF Flyers	ECSHL	27	10	12	22	6	5	2	4	6	2
1950–51	Ottawa RCAF Flyers	ECSHL	38	0	12	12	54	7	1	3	4	14
1950–51	Ottawa Senators	QMHL	—	—	—	—	—	3	0	0	0	4
1951–52	Ottawa Senators	QMHL	3	0	0	0	0	—	—	—	—	—
1951–52	Renfrew Millionaires	ECSHL	40	9	27	36	52	3	1	1	2	10
NHL totals			125	36	34	70	81	13	3	5	8	9
ECSHL totals			105	19	51	70	112	15	4	8	12	26

== Transactions ==
- November 19, 1946 - Traded to the Springfield Indians by the Montreal Canadiens (Buffalo Bisons).
- March 3, 1947 - Traded to the Montreal Canadiens by the Springfield Indians for cash.
- December 16, 1947 - Traded to the Boston Bruins by the Montreal Canadiens with Jimmy Peters for Joe Carveth.

Preceded by Kilby MacDonald	Winner of the Calder Memorial Trophy; 1941	Succeeded by Grant Warwick
