= Jack Stewart (ice hockey) =

Canadian ice hockey player (1917–1983)

- Hockey Hall of Fame, 1964
- Jack Stewart, while playing for the Detroit Red Wings
- Born: May 6, 1917 Pilot Mound, Manitoba, Canada
- Died: May 25, 1983 (aged 66) Troy, Michigan, U.S.
- Height: 5 ft 11 in (180 cm)
- Weight: 180 lb (82 kg; 12 st 12 lb)
- Position: Defence
- Shot: Left
- Played for: Detroit Red Wings; Chicago Black Hawks
- Playing career: 1937–1953

John Sherratt Stewart (May 6, 1917 – May 25, 1983) was a Canadian professional ice hockey player who was a defenceman for 12 National Hockey League (NHL) seasons for the Detroit Red Wings and Chicago Black Hawks. He won two Stanley Cup championships with the Red Wings and was named to the post-season NHL All-Star team on five occasions: three times on the first team and twice on the second. Stewart also played in the first four NHL All-Star Games. After completing his NHL career as captain of the Black Hawks, he went on to coach numerous teams at various levels of hockey.

Stewart was regarded as the hardest hitting defenceman of his time, a reputation that earned him his nickname. His style of play routinely resulted in injuries and scars; he defied expectations by returning to the game after suffering a ruptured disc in his back and later a fractured skull. He was inducted into the Hockey Hall of Fame in 1964, and is also honoured by the Manitoba Hockey and Sports Halls of Fame.

== Playing career ==
Stewart played junior hockey with the Portage Terriers of the Manitoba Junior Hockey League in 1935–36 and 1936–37, where he was discovered by a Winnipeg businessman who suggested that James Norris, owner of the Detroit Red Wings, sign him. He was sent to play his first season of professional hockey for the team's minor league affiliate, the Pittsburgh Hornets of the International-American Hockey League (IAHL). He recorded one assist in 48 games in the 1937–38 season.

Partway through his second season with the Hornets, the Red Wings recalled Stewart as part of a bid to shake up their team which had been struggling. He appeared in 32 games in his NHL rookie season of 1938–39, and immediately established himself as a physical presence. He played in all 48 games for Detroit in 1939–40; his lone goal on the campaign was the first of his career. Stewart and the Red Wings reached the Stanley Cup Final in both 1941 and 1942, but lost to the Boston Bruins and Toronto Maple Leafs, respectively. In his fifth season, 1942–43, Stewart was named to the NHL first All-Star team on defence and helped lead the Red Wings to the NHL regular season title. Reaching the Cup Final for the third consecutive season, Detroit defeated Boston to win the Stanley Cup. Stewart scored one goal, added two assists and had 35 penalty minutes in ten playoff games.

Stewart's NHL career was interrupted by the Second World War in 1943. He remained in Canada, serving as a Leading Aircraftman in the Royal Canadian Air Force and playing hockey for the Montreal RCAF and Winnipeg RCAF teams between 1943 and 1945. Upon his return to the NHL, Stewart was paired up with Bill Quackenbush on the Red Wings defence. He went on to earn four additional all-star selections: he was named to the second team in 1945–46 and 1946–47, and to the first team again in 1947–48 and 1948–49. Additionally, he played in the first four National Hockey League All-Star Games, held between 1947 and 1950. Not known for his offence, Stewart never scored more than five goals in a season, and his career high of 19 points was set in 1947–48. He won his second Stanley Cup with the Red Wings in 1950 as they defeated the New York Rangers in double overtime of the deciding seventh game.

Following the championship, the Red Wings dealt Stewart to the Chicago Black Hawks as part of a nine-player trade that was, at the time, the largest in NHL history. Stewart, Harry Lumley, Al Dewsbury, Pete Babando and Don Morrison were sent to Chicago in exchange for Metro Prystai, Bob Goldham, Gaye Stewart and Jim Henry. The Black Hawks named Stewart team captain and assistant coach almost immediately.

Stewart missed the majority of the 1950–51 NHL season and his career was believed over after he suffered a serious spinal injury in a December 14, 1950, game against the Toronto Maple Leafs. Doctors diagnosed his injury as a ruptured disc and urged him to retire. He was told following the injury that he was lucky he could still walk without a cane and not to risk further damage on the ice. Instead, Stewart had the disc removed and after completing what Black Hawks' team doctors described as a "most remarkable" recovery, he opted to continue his career and signed with Chicago for the 1951–52 season.

Early in the season, Stewart suffered a minor skull fracture after colliding with teammate Clare Martin, an injury that forced him out of the lineup for several weeks. Stewart spent two weeks in hospital, after which he announced his retirement, but he again shocked observers by returning to the ice. However, by mid February 1952, his injuries led Stewart to ask the Black Hawks for his release so that he could seek a minor league coaching position.

== Coaching career ==
Stewart was considered as coach of the New Westminster Royals of the Pacific Coast Hockey League, but chose to take the reins of the senior A Chatham Maroons in the Ontario Hockey Association. He served as a player-coach, appearing in 45 games for the Maroons in 1952–53, where he scored two goals and 29 points while accumulating 129 penalty minutes. Stewart played the final games of his career in 1953–54, finishing with eight assists in 21 games.

The following seasons saw Stewart move between several teams as head coach. He left the Maroons to guide the Kitchener-Waterloo Dutchmen in 1955–56, then the Windsor Bulldogs for two seasons between 1957 and 1959. At one point in 1957, he was rumoured to become the next coach of the Chicago Black Hawks, a job that went instead to Rudy Pilous. Stewart moved into the professional ranks in 1961, taking over as the coach of Chicago's Eastern Professional Hockey League affiliate, the Sault Thunderbirds. One year later, Stewart moved to the Pittsburgh Hornets, an American Hockey League affiliate of the Detroit Red Wings. After winning only 16 games in 1962–63, Stewart retired after he was dismissed by the Hornets.

== Playing style ==
"I bodychecked some fellow one night and when he woke up the next day in the hospital he asked who'd hit him with a blackjack."

— Stewart explains how he earned his nickname.

During his career, Stewart was regarded as one of the hardest bodycheckers in the National Hockey League. He also carried the heaviest stick in the league, explaining that "I don't use it for scoring. I use it for breaking arms". Stewart was known for his large grin when hitting opponents; teammate Ted Lindsay noted "when he had that smile, it was time for the opposition to look out". He led the league with 73 penalty minutes in 1945–46, and in the late 1940s, his rivalry with Milt Schmidt of the Boston Bruins was so intense that their physical interactions occasionally overshadowed the games themselves.

Stewart hated his nickname of "Black Jack", as he believed it made him out to be a dirty player. Hockey Hall of Fame defenceman King Clancy agreed he was not dirty, but stated he was the "roughest son of a gun you'd ever want to meet." Stewart's style of play resulted in numerous injuries; he had dozens of scars and required over 200 stitches to close various cuts during his career. At one point he played a full season with a broken hand using a cast formed to hold his stick.

On the ice, Stewart showed good judgment as a defenceman and rarely took himself out of position to throw a hit. His coach in Detroit, Jack Adams, called Stewart "one of the best blueliners in the game", and claimed he was the best defenceman in Red Wings history. Regarded as a good skater, he was able to clear the puck out of his zone and rarely turned it over to the other team. Clare Martin said he was a "defensive defenceman" and that he "didn't carry the puck too much ... His job was defence and everybody in the league knew it."

A charter member of the Detroit Red Wings Hall of Fame in 1944, Stewart was inducted into the Hockey Hall of Fame in 1964. He is also an honoured member of the Michigan Sports, Manitoba Hockey and Sports Halls of Fame. He was named to the Manitoba Hockey Hall of Fame's First All-Century Team in 2000.

== Personal life ==
Stewart was born May 6, 1917, in Pilot Mound, Manitoba, where he learned to play hockey on the community's outdoor rinks. He had three sisters. In the off-seasons, he returned to his family farm, work which was said to have given him the strength he displayed in the NHL. An avid sportsman, Stewart was an active curler during his playing career, and played softball in the summer. Though he was regarded on the ice as one of toughest players in the game, he was also quiet. He was known as "Silent Jack" by his teammates, allowing his actions to speak for him.

Upon leaving hockey in 1963, he focused on a career in harness racing. Stewart's father built a track on the family farm and held a horse racing meet each year to entertain the residents of Pilot Mound. He also followed and assisted his father when the elder Stewart acted as a race judge at fairs held in Manitoba. Stewart was actively involved in the sport from the time he retired as a player. He worked as a race timer and held various judging roles during the summers. He was a judge with the Ontario Racing Commission for nearly 30 years where his reputation matched that of his playing days.

Stewart retired to Florida but returned to Michigan to undergo treatment for cancer. He died on May 6, 1983, at his home in Troy following a lengthy battle with the disease. A widower, he was survived by two children, son Barclay and daughter Jaqueline.

In 2010, the new Pilot Mound Arena was named The 'Black Jack Stewart Arena'.

== Career statistics ==
=== Regular season and playoffs ===
| | | | Regular season | | | | | Playoffs |
| Season | Team | League | GP | G | A | Pts | PIM | GP | G | A | Pts | PIM |
|---|---|---|---|---|---|---|---|---|---|---|---|---|
| 1935–36 | Portage Terriers | MJHL | 16 | 0 | 0 | 0 | 6 | 6 | 0 | 1 | 1 | 4 |
| 1936–37 | Portage Terriers | MJHL | 16 | 4 | 1 | 5 | 20 | 4 | 1 | 1 | 2 | 2 |
| 1937–38 | Pittsburgh Hornets | IAHL | 48 | 0 | 1 | 1 | 16 | 2 | 0 | 0 | 0 | 0 |
| 1938–39 | Pittsburgh Hornets | IAHL | 21 | 0 | 0 | 0 | 20 | — | — | — | — | — |
| 1938–39 | Detroit Red Wings | NHL | 32 | 0 | 1 | 1 | 18 | — | — | — | — | — |
| 1939–40 | Detroit Red Wings | NHL | 48 | 1 | 0 | 1 | 40 | 5 | 0 | 0 | 0 | 0 |
| 1940–41 | Detroit Red Wings | NHL | 47 | 2 | 6 | 8 | 56 | 9 | 1 | 2 | 3 | 8 |
| 1941–42 | Detroit Red Wings | NHL | 44 | 4 | 7 | 11 | 93 | 12 | 0 | 1 | 1 | 12 |
| 1942–43 | Detroit Red Wings | NHL | 44 | 2 | 9 | 11 | 68 | 10 | 1 | 2 | 3 | 35 |
| 1943–44 | Montreal RCAF | MNDHL | 7 | 3 | 5 | 8 | 18 | — | — | — | — | — |
| 1944–45 | Winnipeg RCAF | WNDHL | 2 | 0 | 1 | 1 | 2 | — | — | — | — | — |
| 1945–46 | Detroit Red Wings | NHL | 47 | 4 | 11 | 15 | 73 | 5 | 0 | 0 | 0 | 14 |
| 1946–47 | Detroit Red Wings | NHL | 55 | 5 | 9 | 14 | 83 | 5 | 0 | 1 | 1 | 12 |
| 1947–48 | Detroit Red Wings | NHL | 60 | 5 | 14 | 19 | 91 | 9 | 1 | 3 | 4 | 6 |
| 1948–49 | Detroit Red Wings | NHL | 60 | 4 | 11 | 15 | 96 | 11 | 1 | 1 | 2 | 32 |
| 1949–50 | Detroit Red Wings | NHL | 65 | 3 | 11 | 14 | 86 | 14 | 1 | 4 | 5 | 20 |
| 1950–51 | Chicago Black Hawks | NHL | 26 | 0 | 2 | 2 | 49 | — | — | — | — | — |
| 1951–52 | Chicago Black Hawks | NHL | 37 | 1 | 3 | 4 | 12 | — | — | — | — | — |
| 1952–53 | Chatham Maroons | OHA Sr. | 45 | 2 | 27 | 29 | 134 | — | — | — | — | — |
| 1953–54 | Chatham Maroons | OHA Sr. | 21 | 0 | 8 | 8 | 35 | 6 | 0 | 0 | 0 | 8 |
| NHL totals | | | 565 | 31 | 84 | 115 | 765 | 80 | 5 | 14 | 19 | 139 |

== Awards and honours ==
National Hockey League
| Award | Year | Ref. |
|---|---|---|
| Stanley Cup champion | 1943, 1950 | |
| First team All-Star | 1942–43; 1947–48; 1948–49 | |
| Second Team All-Star | 1945–46; 1946–47 | |
| Played in the NHL All-Star Game | 1947, 1948, 1949, 1950 | |

| Preceded by Doug Bentley | Chicago Black Hawks captain 1950–52 | Succeeded by Bill Gadsby |
