= 1942–43 NHL season =

Professional ice hockey league season

- League: National Hockey League
- Sport: Ice hockey
- Duration: October 31, 1942 – April 8, 1943
- Games: 50
- Teams: 6

Regular season
- Season champion: Detroit Red Wings
- Season MVP: Bill Cowley (Bruins)
- Top scorer: Doug Bentley (Black Hawks)

Stanley Cup
- Champions: Detroit Red Wings
- Runners-up: Boston Bruins

NHL seasons
- ← 1941–42 1943–44 →

The 1942–43 NHL season was the 26th season of the National Hockey League (NHL). The Brooklyn Americans were dropped, leaving six teams played 50 games each. This is the first season of the "Original Six" era of the NHL. The league's long-time president Frank Calder died due to heart disease. The Detroit Red Wings defeated the Boston Bruins to win the Stanley Cup.

== League business ==
The NHL and the Canadian Amateur Hockey Association (CAHA) agreed in principle that a junior-aged player could become a professional whenever he wanted, to make a living under wartime conditions. They expected that NHL clubs would rely on junior-aged players as replacements due to military enlistments. In October 1942, a new professional-amateur agreement was reached by NHL president Frank Calder, and CAHA president Frank Sargent. NHL teams were permitted to sign junior-aged players if the junior club was contacted first, and agreed not to sign any other junior-eligible players who had not yet played for the CAHA. The NHL continued to pay the CAHA for developing players.

The Brooklyn Americans franchise was dropped, as Madison Square Garden turned down a lease agreement with team owner Red Dutton. Dutton argued that the other teams would be weakened by the war, but the other owners pointed out the number of American players serving in the armed forces was such that the Americans could not operate. A despondent Dutton left the league meeting, but was to return to the NHL sooner than he thought.

With the suspension of the Americans, this was the inaugural season of the so-called Original Six era, with the NHL consisting of six teams (the Boston Bruins, Chicago Black Hawks, Detroit Red Wings, Montreal Canadiens, New York Rangers, and Toronto Maple Leafs). This arrangement would last until the 1966–67 season, after which the league doubled in size.

=== Death of Frank Calder ===
The league's meeting of January 25, 1943, was to have been a non-event. The only news that was supposed to come out of the meeting was that the playoffs would begin on March 20, and that all series would be best-of-seven affairs. This was resolved in the morning session.

The afternoon session had just begun and Calder had informed Red Dutton of the reserve status of his suspended franchise, when Toronto coach Hap Day noticed that Calder appeared to be in pain. Two league governors came up to his aid, but he assured them he was all right. Then Calder's face contracted as if he were in pain. He took a few steps and exclaimed "My God, there IS something wrong!" He was taken to his hotel room and a doctor diagnosed a heart attack. A specialist convinced him, despite his protests, to check into St. Michael's Hospital in Toronto, where he suffered a second heart attack. In a week, Calder felt well enough to return to Montreal and checked into Montreal General Hospital. After eating a light breakfast surrounded by his family and friends, he was looking over the league books when he slipped back on the pillows of his bed and died of a third heart attack. He died on February 4, 1943, at the age of 65 years. Red Dutton was chosen as the new president, on an "interim" basis.

== Regular season ==
Due to war-time travel restrictions, the NHL ceased playing overtimes to decide tie games on November 21 partway through the season. The last regular season overtime game was November 10, 1942, between the Chicago Black Hawks and the New York Rangers, won by New York 5–3. Regular season overtime would not be re-introduced until the 1983–84 NHL season, with a slight change from playing out an entire 10-minute overtime period, to a 5-minute sudden death format.

=== Highlights ===
Detroit finished first, partly due to the six shutouts of goaltender Johnny Mowers, who won the Vezina Trophy. During the season, Jimmy Orlando got into a stick-swinging incident with Toronto rookie Gaye Stewart and came out of it on the short end, badly cut in the face and bleeding profusely. Both players were suspended for the incident.

The Montreal Canadiens were still making progress, and coach Dick Irvin put together the first "Punch Line" of Elmer Lach, Toe Blake and Joe Benoit. Maurice Richard showed promise, but broke his leg, and Canadiens' manager Tommy Gorman began to look at him as brittle. Benoit became the first Canadien to hit the 30 goal plateau since Howie Morenz did it in 1929–30 (40 goals) scoring an even 30. Gordie Drillon also added some scoring power. The Canadiens made the playoffs by one slim point and lost to Boston in the playoffs' first round.

In contrast to the 1941–42 season, the Rangers felt the full impact of World War II and lost Art Coulter, Alex Shibicky, the Colville brothers, and Bill Juzda to the Armed Forces. Only Ott Heller was left of their defence. Babe Pratt was traded to Toronto for Hank Goldup and Dudley "Red" Garrett. Garrett proved to be an excellent replacement for Pratt. However, he only played 21 games, then gave his life in the Armed Forces. Goaltending was the Rangers problem as Steve Buzinski, Jimmy Franks, and old veteran Bill Beveridge all had to face lots of rubber as the Rangers went from first to worst.

=== Final standings ===
National Hockey League
		GP	W	L	T	GF	GA	DIFF	Pts
1	Detroit Red Wings	50	25	14	11	169	124	+45	61
2	Boston Bruins	50	24	17	9	195	176	+19	57
3	Toronto Maple Leafs	50	22	19	9	198	159	+39	53
4	Montreal Canadiens	50	19	19	12	181	191	−10	50
5	Chicago Black Hawks	50	17	18	15	179	180	−1	49
6	New York Rangers	50	11	31	8	161	253	−92	30

== Playoffs ==
=== Playoff bracket ===
With the reduction of the league to six teams, the number of teams qualifying for the Stanley Cup playoffs was reduced to four, and the quarterfinal round was eliminated. In the semifinals, the first-place team played the third-place team, while the second-place team faced the fourth-place team, with the winners advancing to the Stanley Cup Finals. In both rounds, teams competed in a best-of-seven series (scores in the bracket indicate the number of games won in each best-of-seven series).

This format would remain in place through the 1966–67 NHL season, after which expansion would increase the number of teams in the playoffs.

Semifinals
1	Detroit	4
3	Toronto	2
2	Boston	4
4	Montreal	1

Stanley Cup Finals
1	Detroit	4
2	Boston	0

=== Semifinals ===
==== (1) Detroit Red Wings vs. (3) Toronto Maple Leafs ====
March 21	Toronto Maple Leafs	2–4	Detroit Red Wings	Olympia Stadium	Recap
Mel Hill (1) – 13:18		First period	17:24 – Carl Liscombe (1)
No scoring		Second period	No scoring
Jack Hamilton (1) – 13:55		Third period	06:06 – Don Grosso (1); 06:43 – Eddie Wares (1); 11:00 – Les Douglas (1)
Turk Broda		Goalie stats	Johnny Mowers

March 23	Toronto Maple Leafs	3–2	4OT	Detroit Red Wings	Olympia Stadium	Recap
No scoring		First period		12:36 – Joe Carveth (1)
Reg Hamilton (1) – 00:52; Lorne Carr (1) – pp – 16:27		Second period		No scoring
No scoring		Third period		12:47 – Joe Carveth (2)
Jack McLean (1) – 10:18		Fourth overtime period		No scoring
Turk Broda		Goalie stats		Johnny Mowers

March 25	Detroit Red Wings	4–2	Toronto Maple Leafs	Maple Leaf Gardens	Recap
Cully Simon (1) – 01:04; Carl Liscombe (2) – pp – 09:21; Sid Abel (1) – pp – 17:30		First period	No scoring
No scoring		Second period	No scoring
Eddie Wares (2) – pp – 09:56		Third period	14:41 – pp – Bud Poile (1); 16:12 – Billy Taylor (1)
Johnny Mowers		Goalie stats	Turk Broda

March 27	Detroit Red Wings	3–6	Toronto Maple Leafs	Maple Leaf Gardens	Recap
Carl Liscombe (3) – 02:15; Carl Liscombe (4) – pp – 13:50		First period	12:02 – pp – Bud Poile (2); 17:37 – Bucko McDonald (1)
Sid Abel (2) – pp – 07:58		Second period	02:27 – Billy Taylor (2); 17:12 – Bob Davidson (1); 19:48 – pp – Sweeney Schriner (1)
No scoring		Third period	17:50 – Mel Hill (2)
Johnny Mowers		Goalie stats	Turk Broda

March 28	Toronto Maple Leafs	2–4	Detroit Red Wings	Olympia Stadium	Recap
No scoring		First period	14:54 – Eddie Wares (3)
Mel Hill (3) – 15:12; Babe Pratt (1) – 16:11		Second period	No scoring
No scoring		Third period	02:18 – Sid Abel (3); 08:13 – Mud Bruneteau (1); 19:59 – Sid Abel (4)
Turk Broda		Goalie stats	Johnny Mowers

March 30	Detroit Red Wings	3–2	OT	Toronto Maple Leafs	Maple Leaf Gardens	Recap
No scoring		First period		No scoring
Mud Bruneteau (2) – 11:46		Second period		No scoring
Joe Carveth (3) – 07:19		Third period		11:55 – Jack McLean (2); 19:47 – Sweeney Schriner (2)
Adam Brown (1) – 09:21		First overtime period		No scoring
Johnny Mowers		Goalie stats		Turk Broda

Detroit won series 4–2

==== (2) Boston Bruins vs. (4) Montreal Canadiens ====
This was the last time that Boston defeated Montreal in a postseason series until 1988.

March 21	Montreal Canadiens	4–5	OT	Boston Bruins	Boston Garden	Recap
Toe Blake (1) – 18:19		First period		No scoring
Buddy O'Connor (1) – pp – 00:42; Toe Blake (2) – 01:52		Second period		03:51 – Don Gallinger (1); 08:06 – pp – Art Jackson (1)
Dutch Hiller (1) – 07:40		Third period		08:37 – Oscar Aubuchon (1); 15:53 – pp – Bill Cowley (1)
No scoring		First overtime period		12:30 – Don Gallinger (2)
Paul Bibeault		Goalie stats		Frank Brimsek

March 23	Montreal Canadiens	3–5	Boston Bruins	Boston Garden	Recap
No scoring		First period	No scoring
No scoring		Second period	06:07 – Don Gallinger (3); 16:39 – Ab DeMarco (1); 18:02 – Art Jackson (2)
Gordie Drillon (1) – 14:28; Toe Blake (3) – 15:02; Gordie Drillon (2) – 15:45		Third period	06:46 – Herb Cain (1); 18:56 – Art Jackson (3)
Paul Bibeault		Goalie stats	Frank Brimsek

March 25	Boston Bruins	3–2	OT	Montreal Canadiens	Montreal Forum	Recap
No scoring		First period		13:44 – Elmer Lach (1)
Herb Cain (2) – 08:45		Second period		05:14 – Gordie Drillon (3)
Dit Clapper (1) – 19:08		Third period		No scoring
Busher Jackson (1) – sh – 03:20		First overtime period		No scoring
Frank Brimsek		Goalie stats		Paul Bibeault

March 27	Boston Bruins	0–4	Montreal Canadiens	Montreal Forum	Recap
No scoring		First period	04:14 – Jack Portland (1)
No scoring		Second period	17:26 – Toe Blake (4)
No scoring		Third period	08:47 – Buddy O'Connor (2); 16:06 – Joe Benoit (1)
Frank Brimsek		Goalie stats	Paul Bibeault

March 30	Montreal Canadiens	4–5	OT	Boston Bruins	Boston Garden	Recap
Elmer Lach (2) – 10:31; Buddy O'Connor (3) – 11:15		First period		12:20 – Dit Clapper (2)
Buddy O'Connor (4) – 08:51; Gordie Drillon (4) – 13:17		Second period		12:41 – Murph Chamberlain (1); 14:54 – Herb Cain (3)
No scoring		Third period		09:49 – Herb Cain (4)
No scoring		First overtime period		03:41 – Ab DeMarco (2)
Paul Bibeault		Goalie stats		Frank Brimsek

Boston won series 4–1

=== Stanley Cup Finals ===
April 1	Boston Bruins	2–6	Detroit Red Wings	Olympia Stadium	Recap
Art Jackson (4) – 18:13		First period	01:15 – Jack Stewart (1)
No scoring		Second period	01:12 – Mud Bruneteau (3); 15:43 – sh – Sid Abel (5); 19:06 – Joe Carveth (4)
Ab DeMarco (3) – 17:53		Third period	01:21 – Mud Bruneteau (4); 16:24 – Mud Bruneteau (5)
Frank Brimsek		Goalie stats	Johnny Mowers

April 4	Boston Bruins	3–4	Detroit Red Wings	Olympia Stadium	Recap
No scoring		First period	No scoring
Jack Crawford (1) – 10:16; Art Jackson (5) – 11:04		Second period	17:06 – Les Douglas (2)
Art Jackson (6) – 16:38		Third period	05:55 – Joe Carveth (5); 06:21 – Carl Liscombe (5); 13:16 – Syd Howe (1)
Frank Brimsek		Goalie stats	Johnny Mowers

April 7	Detroit Red Wings	4–0	Boston Bruins	Boston Garden	Recap
Don Grosso (2) – 03:46; Don Grosso (3) – pp – 10:16		First period	No scoring
No scoring		Second period	No scoring
Les Douglas (3) – 08:03; Don Grosso (4) – 18:41		Third period	No scoring
Johnny Mowers		Goalie stats	Frank Brimsek

April 8	Detroit Red Wings	2–0	Boston Bruins	Boston Garden	Recap
Joe Carveth (6) – 12:09		First period	No scoring
Carl Liscombe (6) – 02:45		Second period	No scoring
No scoring		Third period	No scoring
Johnny Mowers		Goalie stats	Frank Brimsek

Detroit won series 4–0

== Awards ==
Calder Memorial Trophy: (Best first-year player)	Gaye Stewart, Toronto Maple Leafs
Hart Trophy: (Most valuable player)	Bill Cowley, Boston Bruins
Lady Byng Trophy: (Excellence and sportsmanship)	Max Bentley, Chicago Black Hawks
O'Brien Cup: (Stanley Cup runner-up)	Boston Bruins
Prince of Wales Trophy: (Best regular-season record)	Detroit Red Wings
Vezina Trophy: (Fewest goals allowed)	Johnny Mowers, Detroit Red Wings

=== All-Star teams ===
First team	Position	Second team
Johnny Mowers, Detroit Red Wings	G	Frank Brimsek, Boston Bruins
Earl Seibert, Chicago Black Hawks	D	Jack Crawford, Boston Bruins
Jack Stewart, Detroit Red Wings	D	Flash Hollett, Boston Bruins
Bill Cowley, Boston Bruins	C	Syl Apps, Toronto Maple Leafs
Lorne Carr, Toronto Maple Leafs	RW	Bryan Hextall, New York Rangers
Doug Bentley, Chicago Black Hawks	LW	Lynn Patrick, New York Rangers
Jack Adams, Detroit Red Wings	Coach	Art Ross, Boston Bruins

== Player statistics ==
=== Scoring leaders ===
Note: GP = Games played, G = Goals, A = Assists, PTS = Points, PIM = Penalties in minutes

Player	Team	GP	G	A	PTS	PIM
Doug Bentley	Chicago Black Hawks	50	33	40	73	18
Bill Cowley	Boston Bruins	48	27	45	72	10
Max Bentley	Chicago Black Hawks	47	26	44	70	2
Lynn Patrick	New York Rangers	50	22	39	61	28
Lorne Carr	Toronto Maple Leafs	50	27	33	60	15
Billy Taylor	Toronto Maple Leafs	50	18	42	60	2
Bryan Hextall	New York Rangers	50	27	32	59	28
Toe Blake	Montreal Canadiens	48	23	36	59	26
Elmer Lach	Montreal Canadiens	45	18	40	58	14
Buddy O'Connor	Montreal Canadiens	50	15	43	58	2

Source: NHL

=== Leading goaltenders ===
Note: GP = Games played; Mins – Minutes played; GA = Goals against; GAA = Goals against average; W = Wins; L = Losses; T = Ties; SO = Shutouts

Player	Team	GP	Mins	GA	W	L	T	SO	GAA
Johnny Mowers	Detroit Red Wings	50	3010	124	25	14	11	6	2.47
Turk Broda	Toronto Maple Leafs	50	3000	159	22	19	9	1	3.18
Frank Brimsek	Boston Bruins	50	3000	176	24	17	9	1	3.53
Bert Gardiner	Chicago Black Hawks	50	3020	180	17	18	15	1	3.58
Paul Bibeault	Montreal Canadiens	50	3010	191	19	19	12	1	3.81
Jimmy Franks	New York Rangers	23	1380	103	5	14	4	0	4.48
Bill Beveridge	New York Rangers	17	1020	89	4	10	3	1	5.24

== Coaches ==
- Boston Bruins: Art Ross
- Chicago Black Hawks: Paul Thompson
- Detroit Red Wings: Jack Adams
- Montreal Canadiens: Dick Irvin
- New York Rangers: Frank Boucher
- Toronto Maple Leafs: Hap Day

== Debuts ==
The following is a list of players of note who played their first NHL game in 1942–43 (listed with their first team, asterisk(*) marks debut in playoffs):

- Bep Guidolin, Boston Bruins (youngest rookie in NHL history)
- Glen Harmon, Montreal Canadiens
- Ted Kennedy, Toronto Maple Leafs
- Joe Klukay*, Toronto Maple Leafs
- Bobby Lee, Montreal Canadiens
- Bud Poile, Toronto Maple Leafs
- Bill Quackenbush, Detroit Red Wings
- Maurice Richard, Montreal Canadiens

== Last games ==
The following is a list of players of note that played their last game in the NHL in 1942–43 (listed with their last team):

- Ebbie Goodfellow, Detroit Red Wings
- Gordie Drillon, Montreal Canadiens

== See also ==
- 1942–43 NHL transactions
- List of Stanley Cup champions
- 1942 in sports
- 1943 in sports
