= 1st National Hockey League All-Star Game =

Professional ice hockey exhibition game

1st NHL All-Star Game
	1	2	3	Total
All-Stars	0	2	2	4
Toronto Maple Leafs	1	2	0	3
- Date: October 13, 1947
- Arena: Maple Leaf Gardens
- City: Toronto
- Attendance: 14,169

The 1st National Hockey League All-Star Game took place at Maple Leaf Gardens, home of the Toronto Maple Leafs, on October 13, 1947. The game saw the Maple Leafs play a team of NHL all-stars. The All-Stars won the game 4–3.

== Founding ==
The NHL All-Star Game originated from the Players Committee and was approved on May 23, 1947. For the site of the All-Star Charity Game, it was applied for by Toronto and Chicago, with Chicago receiving the second game, in 1948. It was agreed that proceeds would be divided whereby one-third would go to Toronto charities, and two-thirds would go to the Players Emergency (Benevolent and Disability) Fund. At a later meeting in September 1947, the players agreed to set up a pension fund, with $900 from every player going into the fund and 25 cents from the sale of every playoff ticket and the two-thirds of the All-Star Game proceeds to go into the fund.

== Pre-game festivities ==
The players selected for the game attended a Toronto Argonauts-Hamilton Tiger-Cats football game on the day of the Game. That was followed by a dinner at the Royal York Hotel. The players were given miniature engraved gold pucks. There were extra gifts for the Maple Leafs, who had won the Stanley Cup the previous spring. The Leafs received gold cufflinks from the Ontario government and a free lifetime pass from Conn Smythe. Sponsors gave each player a coat, a hat, a table lighter, golf balls, a tie, cigarette boxes, pocket knives, team photos, silver tea trays, engraved gold watches and silver watch chains.

== Game description ==
The All-Stars wore red sweaters with white stars across the chest above a white and red NHL shield, and white and blue stripes running down the shoulders and sleeves. This uniform would be used through the 1955 All-Star Game, and later adapted for the Campbell Conference All-Stars in the 1992 game. The referees wore dark blue sweaters. The Leafs wore their white sweaters.

The game was well-contested and was physical. Ken Reardon was assessed a major penalty for cutting Bob Goldham on the head after a dirty cross-check. Reardon was involved in a stick-swinging incident between himself and Bill Ezinicki and Gus Mortson. Maurice Richard was placed on a line with Ted Lindsay. The pair, who would often fight it out in regular games did not share a word, according to Richard.

=== Summary ===
	Maple Leafs	All-Stars
Final score	3	4
Scoring summary	Watson (Ezinicki) 12:29 first; Ezinicki (Apps, Watson) 1:03 second; Apps (Watson) 5:01 second	Max Bentley (Reardon) 4:39 second; Warwick (Laprade, Reardon) 9:25 second; Richard (unassisted) 0:28 third; Doug Bentley (Schmidt, Richard) 1:26 third
Penalties	Mortson, Ezinicki(2) first; Lynn (minor, major) second; Mortson(2), Ezinicki third	Leswick, Bauer first; Reardon (minor, major) second; Bouchard, Schmidt third
Win/loss	Turk Broda	Frank Brimsek

- Referee: King Clancy
- Linesmen: Jim Primeau, Ed Mepham
- Attendance: 14,169

Source: Podnieks(2000), p. 25.

== Rosters ==
	Maple Leafs	All-Stars
Head coach	(Canada) Hap Day (Toronto Maple Leafs)	(Canada) Dick Irvin (Montreal Canadiens)
Lineup	Maple Leafs: (Canada) 1 - G Turk Broda; (Canada) 2 - D Bob Goldham; (Canada) 3 - D Wally Stanowski; (Canada) 4 - LW Harry Watson; (Canada) 5 - RW Don Metz; (Canada) 7 - C Bud Poile; (Canada) 9 - C Ted Kennedy; (Canada) 10 - C Syl Apps (C); (Canada) 12 - RW Bill Ezinicki; (Canada) 14 - D Vic Lynn; (Canada) 15 - RW Howie Meeker; (Canada) 16 - LW Gaye Stewart; (Canada) 17 - LW Joe Klukay; (Canada) 19 - D Gus Mortson; (Canada) 20 - D Jimmy Thomson; (Canada) 21 - D Bill Barilko; (Canada) 22 - C Fleming Mackell	All-Stars: (United States) 1 - G Frank Brimsek (Boston Bruins); (Canada) 1 - G Bill Durnan (Montreal Canadiens); (Canada) 2 - D Jack Stewart (Detroit Red Wings); (Canada) 3 - D Butch Bouchard (Montreal Canadiens); (Canada) 4 - D Bill Quackenbush (Detroit Red Wings); (Canada) 5 - C Max Bentley (Chicago Black Hawks); (Canada) 6 - RW Bill Mosienko (Chicago Black Hawks); (Canada) 7 - LW Doug Bentley (Chicago Black Hawks); (Canada) 8 - RW Grant Warwick (New York Rangers); (Canada) 9 - RW Maurice Richard (Montreal Canadiens); (Canada) 10 - C Edgar Laprade (New York Rangers); (Canada) 11 - LW Ted Lindsay (Detroit Red Wings); (Canada) 14 - LW Woody Dumart (Boston Bruins); (Canada) 15 - C Milt Schmidt (Boston Bruins); (Canada) 17 - LW Bobby Bauer (Boston Bruins); (Canada) 17 - D Ken Reardon (Montreal Canadiens); (Canada) 18 - LW Tony Leswick (New York Rangers)

Source: Podnieks(2000), p. 25.

== See also ==
- 1947–48 NHL season
