= Don Grosso =

Canadian ice hockey player

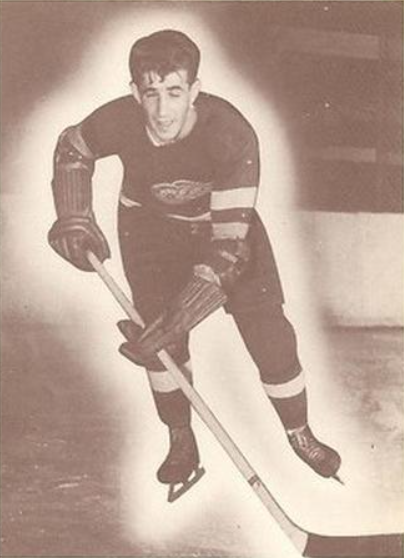
- Grosso in 1940 card
- Born: April 12, 1915 Sault Ste. Marie, Ontario, Canada
- Died: May 14, 1985 (aged 70) Detroit, MI, USA
- Height: 5 ft 11 in (180 cm)
- Weight: 170 lb (77 kg; 12 st 2 lb)
- Position: Centre
- Shot: Left
- Played for: Detroit Red Wings; Boston Bruins; Chicago Black Hawks
- Playing career: 1938–1949

Donald Joseph Grosso (April 12, 1915 – May 14, 1985) was a Canadian ice hockey forward. He was born in Sault Ste. Marie, Ontario.

Grosso started his National Hockey League career with the Detroit Red Wings. He also played with the Boston Bruins and Chicago Black Hawks in a career that lasted from 1938 to 1947. Grosso won one Stanley Cup in his career in 1943 with Detroit.

== Career statistics ==
			Regular season					Playoffs
Season	Team	League	GP	G	A	Pts	PIM	GP	G	A	Pts	PIM
1933–34	Detroit Mundus	MOHL	10	8	1	9	17	6	3	0	3	8
1934–35	Sudbury Cub Wolves	NBHL	7	3	0	3	4	5	1	2	3	2
1935–36	Falconbridge Falcons	NBHL	10	7	6	13	10	3	4	1	5	4
1935–36	Falconbridge Falcons	Al-Cup	—	—	—	—	—	13	8	3	11	18
1936–37	Sudbury Frood Miners	NBHL	14	11	5	16	6	2	0	1	1	2
1936–37	Sudbury Frood Miners	Al-Cup	—	—	—	—	—	14	13	5	18	4
1937–38	Falconbridge Falcons	NBHL	13	13	8	21	2	3	1	2	3	6
1937–38	Falconbridge Falcons	Al-Cup	—	—	—	—	—	9	5	9	14	15
1938–39	Kirkland Lake Blue Devils	NBHL	7	17	12	29	2	2	4	2	6	0
1938–39	Detroit Red Wings	NHL	1	1	1	2	0	3	1	2	3	7
1938–39	Kirkland Lake Blue Devils	Al-Cup	—	—	—	—	—	7	14	3	17	2
1939–40	Detroit Red Wings	NHL	29	2	3	5	11	5	0	0	0	0
1940–41	Detroit Red Wings	NHL	45	8	7	15	14	9	1	4	5	0
1941–42	Detroit Red Wings	NHL	48	23	30	53	13	12	8	6	14	29
1942–43	Detroit Red Wings	NHL	50	15	17	32	10	10	4	2	6	10
1943–44	Detroit Red Wings	NHL	42	16	31	47	13	5	1	0	1	0
1944–45	Detroit Red Wings	NHL	20	6	10	16	6	—	—	—	—	—
1944–45	Chicago Black Hawks	NHL	21	9	6	15	4	—	—	—	—	—
1945–46	Chicago Black Hawks	NHL	47	7	10	17	17	4	0	0	0	17
1946–47	Boston Bruins	NHL	33	0	2	2	2	—	—	—	—	—
1946–47	Hershey Bears	AHL	25	8	14	22	34	11	4	6	10	2
1947–48	St. Louis Flyers	AHL	65	34	47	81	10	—	—	—	—	—
1948–49	St. Louis Flyers	AHL	63	10	45	55	17	7	0	2	2	4
1949–50	Sault Ste. Marie Greyhounds	NOHA	—	—	—	—	—	11	5	6	11	—
1950–51	Sault Ste. Marie Greyhounds	NOHA	—	—	—	—	—	8	2	2	4	12
1951–52	Sault Ste. Marie Greyhounds	NOHA	4	0	1	1	0	8	2	2	4	12
NBHL totals			51	51	31	82	24	15	10	8	18	14
Al-Cup totals			—	—	—	—	—	43	40	20	60	39
NHL totals			336	87	117	204	90	48	15	14	29	63
