= Ab DeMarco =

Canadian ice hockey player (1916-1989)

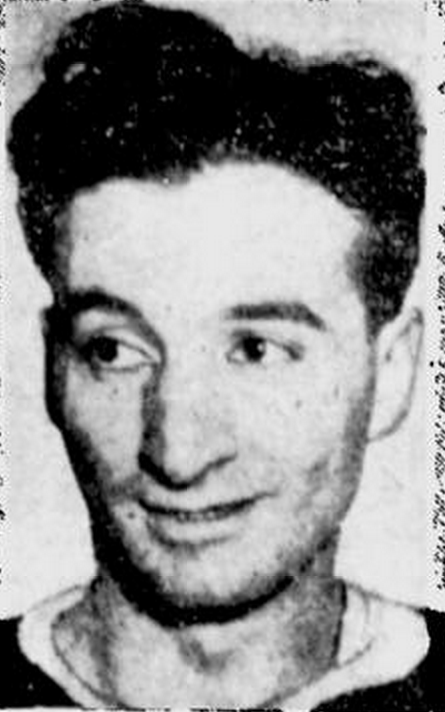
- DeMarco pictured in a 1943 newspaper
- Born: May 10, 1916 North Bay, Ontario, Canada
- Died: May 25, 1989 (aged 73) North Bay, Ontario, Canada
- Height: 6 ft 0 in (183 cm)
- Weight: 168 lb (76 kg; 12 st 0 lb)
- Position: Centre
- Shot: Right
- Played for: New York Rangers; Boston Bruins; Toronto Maple Leafs; Chicago Black Hawks
- Playing career: 1937–1952

Albert George DeMarco, Sr. (May 10, 1916 – May 25, 1989) was a Canadian professional ice hockey player. DeMarco started his National Hockey League career with the Chicago Black Hawks. He would also play with the New York Rangers, Boston Bruins and Toronto Maple Leafs. He played in the NHL from 1938 to 1947. He played several years in minor professional hockey until 1952, and played on in senior amateur hockey in his hometown of North Bay during the 1950s.

== Career ==
Albert was born in North Bay, Ontario. He played junior and minor hockey from 1933 until 1937, when he became a professional with the Baltimore Orioles of the Eastern American Hockey League. DeMarco signed with the Chicago Black Hawks in 1938, splitting time with the Providence Reds of the International-American Hockey League. After two seasons, the Hawks traded DeMarco to Providence, where he played until 1943. In the 1942–43 season, DeMarco was loaned to the Toronto Maple Leafs, then traded to the Boston Bruins. The following November, he was traded by Boston to the New York Rangers. He remained with the Rangers before being traded to the Cleveland Barons of the American Hockey League in 1947. It was the end of his NHL career, but DeMarco played for Cleveland, the Washington Lions and Buffalo Bisons for another five years. In 1952, DeMarco returned to his hometown and played for the senior North Bay Trappers for several more years. His last full season of play was 1954–55. He moved into coaching and played only occasionally until 1959.

DeMarco's overtime goal in the 1943 playoffs against Montreal eliminated the Canadiens; it would be the last time the Bruins defeated Montreal in a playoff series for the next 45 years.

DeMarco was inducted into the North Bay Hall of Fame on November 8, 1980.

DeMarco's son Ab Jr. also played in the NHL.

== Career statistics ==
=== Regular season and playoffs ===
			Regular season					Playoffs
Season	Team	League	GP	G	A	Pts	PIM	GP	G	A	Pts	PIM
1933–34	North Bay T&NO	NOHA	—	—	—	—	—	—	—	—	—	—
1934–35	North Bay Trappers	Exhib	—	—	—	—	—	—	—	—	—	—
1935–36	Barrie Colts	OHA-B	—	—	—	—	—	—	—	—	—	—
1936–37	Falconbridge Falcons	NOHA	13	4	5	9	6	4	0	0	0	0
1937–38	Baltimore Orioles	EAHL	56	25	27	52	12	—	—	—	—	—
1938–39	Chicago Black Hawks	NHL	2	1	0	1	0	—	—	—	—	—
1938–39	Providence Reds	IAHL	53	6	12	18	8	5	0	0	0	2
1939–40	Chicago Black Hawks	NHL	17	0	5	5	17	2	0	0	0	0
1939–40	Providence Reds	IAHL	20	5	9	14	16	—	—	—	—	—
1940–41	Providence Reds	AHL	55	20	34	54	13	4	0	2	2	5
1941–42	Providence Reds	AHL	52	23	38	61	17	—	—	—	—	—
1942–43	Toronto Maple Leafs	NHL	4	0	1	1	0	—	—	—	—	—
1942–43	Boston Bruins	NHL	3	4	1	5	0	9	3	0	3	2
1942–43	Providence Reds	AHL	39	27	39	66	9	—	—	—	—	—
1943–44	Boston Bruins	NHL	3	0	0	0	0	—	—	—	—	—
1943–44	New York Rangers	NHL	36	14	19	33	2	—	—	—	—	—
1944–45	New York Rangers	NHL	50	24	30	54	10	—	—	—	—	—
1945–46	New York Rangers	NHL	50	20	27	47	20	—	—	—	—	—
1946–47	New York Rangers	NHL	44	9	10	19	4	—	—	—	—	—
1947–48	Cleveland Barons	AHL	60	20	61	81	37	9	1	8	9	10
1948–49	Cleveland Barons	AHL	34	15	19	34	28	—	—	—	—	—
1948–49	Washington Lions	AHL	5	1	3	4	0	—	—	—	—	—
1948–49	Buffalo Bisons	AHL	25	7	15	22	12	—	—	—	—	—
1949–50	Buffalo Bisons	AHL	70	40	54	94	16	5	1	5	6	9
1950–51	Buffalo Bisons	AHL	64	37	76	113	35	4	0	3	3	0
1951–52	Buffalo Bisons	AHL	67	28	49	77	34	3	1	0	1	0
1952–53	North Bay Trappers	NOHA	40	20	37	57	38	7	0	5	5	2
1953–54	North Bay Trappers	NOHA	59	23	69	92	8	6	2	7	9	2
1954–55	North Bay Trappers	NOHA	50	19	34	53	4	13	4	7	11	24
1955–56	North Bay Trappers	NOHA	6	0	4	4	2	—	—	—	—	—
1956–57	North Bay Trappers	NOHA	4	1	1	2	0	—	—	—	—	—
1957–58	North Bay Trappers	OHA Sr	—	—	—	—	—	—	—	—	—	—
1958–59	North Bay Trappers	OHA Sr	4	1	1	2	0	—	—	—	—	—
AHL totals			471	218	388	606	201	25	3	18	21	24
NHL totals			209	72	93	165	53	11	3	0	3	2

== Awards ==
- Won John B. Sollenberger Trophy (Top Scorer- AHL) (1951)
- Won Les Cunningham Award (MVP- AHL) (1951)
- 1st All-Star Team (AHL 1950-51)
- 2nd All-Star Teams: (EAHL 1937-38) (AHL 1949-50)

== Transactions ==
- Signed as a free agent by Chicago, September 28, 1938.
- Traded to Providence (AHL) by Chicago for cash, May 14, 1940.
- Loaned to Toronto by Providence (AHL) with the trade of Buck Jones for the loan of Jack Forsey and George Boothman, February 3, 1943.
- Traded to Boston by Providence (AHL) with Oscar Aubuchon and Norm Calladine for cash, March 8, 1943.
- Traded to NY Rangers by Boston for cash, November 1943.
- Traded to Detroit by NY Rangers with Hank Goldup for Flash Hollett, June 19, 1946. Transaction voided when Hollett decided to retire, June, 1946.
- Traded to Cleveland (AHL) by NY Rangers with Joe Cooper for cash, May 5, 1947.
- Traded to Washington (AHL) by Cleveland (AHL) with Bryan Hextall Sr. for Dan Porteous and Ken Schultz, January 20, 1949.
- Traded to Montreal (Buffalo- AHL) by Washington (AHL) for George Robertson with Montreal retaining right of recall, January 28, 1949.
