= Joe Carveth =

Canadian ice hockey player

- Born: March 21, 1918 Regina, Saskatchewan, Canada
- Died: August 15, 1985 (aged 67)
- Height: 5 ft 10 in (178 cm)
- Weight: 175 lb (79 kg; 12 st 7 lb)
- Position: Right wing
- Shot: Right
- Played for: Boston Bruins; Montreal Canadiens; Detroit Red Wings
- Playing career: 1935–1954

Joseph Gordon Carveth (March 21, 1918 – August 15, 1985) was a Canadian professional ice hockey player in the National Hockey League (NHL) with the Boston Bruins, Montreal Canadiens, and Detroit Red Wings between 1940 and 1951. He was born in Regina, Saskatchewan.

Carveth began his NHL career with the Detroit Red Wings in 1940. After spending some time with the Wings' American Hockey League (AHL) affiliate, the Indianapolis Capitals, he became a regular in the Red Wings lineup in 1942. He scored six goals in ten playoff games during Detroit's run to the Stanley Cup championship in 1943.

Carveth was traded to the Boston Bruins for Roy Conacher in 1946. The Bruins then sent him to the Montreal Canadiens for Jimmy Peters. Carveth returned to Detroit in 1949, winning his second Stanley Cup in 1950.

After the 1951 season, Carveth left the NHL, and split the 1951-52 season between the AHL's Cleveland Barons and the Vancouver Canucks of the PCHL. Carveth retired from professional hockey in 1954.

== Awards and achievements ==
- 1943 Stanley Cup Championship (Detroit)
- 1950 Stanley Cup Championship (Detroit)
- 1950 NHL All Star (Detroit)

== Career statistics ==
=== Regular season and playoffs ===
			Regular season					Playoffs
Season	Team	League	GP	G	A	Pts	PIM	GP	G	A	Pts	PIM
1935–36	Regina Green Seals	RJRHL	6	7	0	7	0	—	—	—	—	—
1936–37	Regina Junior Aces	SJHL	6	6	7	13	2	2	2	1	3	0
1936–37	Regina Aces	SSHL	1	0	0	0	0	3	0	0	0	0
1937–38	Detroit Pontiac McLeans	MOHL	27	9	16	25	57	3	0	0	0	0
1938–39	Detroit Pontiac McLeans	MOHL	27	19	25	44	25	7	3	5	8	4
1939–40	Indianapolis Capitals	IAHL	11	2	2	4	0	—	—	—	—	—
1940–41	Detroit Red Wings	NHL	19	2	1	3	2	—	—	—	—	—
1941–42	Detroit Red Wings	NHL	29	6	11	17	2	9	4	0	4	0
1941–42	Indianapolis Capitals	AHL	29	8	17	25	9	—	—	—	—	—
1942–43	Detroit Red Wings	NHL	43	18	18	36	6	10	6	2	8	4
1943–44	Detroit Red Wings	NHL	46	21	35	56	6	5	2	1	3	8
1943–44	Indianapolis Capitals	AHL	1	1	1	2	2	—	—	—	—	—
1944–45	Detroit Red Wings	NHL	50	26	28	54	6	14	5	6	11	2
1945–46	Detroit Red Wings	NHL	48	17	18	35	10	5	0	1	1	0
1946–47	Boston Bruins	NHL	51	21	15	36	18	5	2	1	3	0
1947–48	Boston Bruins	NHL	22	8	9	17	2	—	—	—	—	—
1947–48	Montreal Canadiens	NHL	35	1	10	11	6	—	—	—	—	—
1948–49	Montreal Canadiens	NHL	60	15	22	37	8	7	0	1	1	8
1949–50	Montreal Canadiens	NHL	11	1	1	2	2	—	—	—	—	—
1949–50	Detroit Red Wings	NHL	60	13	17	30	13	14	2	4	6	6
1950–51	Detroit Red Wings	NHL	30	1	4	5	0	—	—	—	—	—
1950–51	Indianapolis Capitals	AHL	37	18	30	48	9	3	0	0	0	0
1951–52	Cleveland Barons	AHL	40	9	15	24	18	—	—	—	—	—
1951–52	Vancouver Canucks	PCHL	19	4	12	16	4	—	—	—	—	—
1952–53	Chatham Maroons	OHA Sr	47	45	39	84	38	—	—	—	—	—
1952–53	Toledo Mercurys	IHL	8	2	3	5	0	5	0	4	4	6
1953–54	Chatham Maroons	OHA Sr	55	16	26	42	105	6	3	1	4	4
NHL totals			504	150	189	339	81	69	21	16	37	28
