= 1940–41 NHL season =

Professional ice hockey league season

- League: National Hockey League
- Sport: Ice hockey
- Duration: November 2, 1940 – April 12, 1941
- Games: 48
- Teams: 7

Regular season
- Season champion: Boston Bruins
- Season MVP: Bill Cowley (Bruins)
- Top scorer: Bill Cowley (Bruins)

Stanley Cup
- Champions: Boston Bruins
- Runners-up: Detroit Red Wings

NHL seasons
- ← 1939–40 1941–42 →

The 1940–41 NHL season was the 24th season of the National Hockey League (NHL). Seven teams played 48 games each. The Boston Bruins were the Stanley Cup winners as they swept the Detroit Red Wings four games to none in the final series.

== League business ==
In September 1940, International Ice Hockey Association president W. G. Hardy announced a new one-year agreement was reached with the NHL, who agreed to pay $250 for signing an amateur and another $250 if the amateur played in the NHL. NHL president Frank Calder signed the new professional-amateur agreement in October 1940. The agreement also included allowing the NHL to sign a limited number of junior age players.

== Regular season ==
The Montreal Canadiens had hit the bottom in 1939–40, and were in financial trouble. Frank Patrick decided to become an investor and governor for the team, and Tommy Gorman was hired as general manager. He hired recently released Toronto coach Dick Irvin to run the team. One of the first things Gorman and Irvin did was scout for players, and the Canadiens came up with Johnny Quilty, Joe Benoit, Elmer Lach and defenceman Ken Reardon. Bert Gardiner would be used in goal, replacing Claude Bourque and Wilf Cude. Murph Chamberlain was bought from Toronto to bolster the offence.

Quilty and Benoit came through, as did Toe Blake, but the Habs had a long way to go, finishing sixth. Quilty won the Calder Trophy as the league's top rookie. In fact, before the season started, Coach Irvin handed a sealed envelope to a reporter of his guess who would win the Calder Trophy, and when the season ended, the reporter opened the envelope: Johnny Quilty was the choice Irvin made.

The Boston Bruins set a record 23 straight unbeaten games en route to a strong first-place finish at the end of the schedule. The Rangers, finished fourth after the previous year's Stanley Cup win and Dave Kerr was not up to his usual form in goal.

=== Final standings ===
National Hockey League
	GP	W	L	T	Pts	GF	GA
**Boston Bruins**	48	27	8	13	67	168	102
**Toronto Maple Leafs**	48	28	14	6	62	145	99
**Detroit Red Wings**	48	21	16	11	53	112	102
**New York Rangers**	48	21	19	8	50	143	125
**Chicago Black Hawks**	48	16	25	7	39	112	139
**Montreal Canadiens**	48	16	26	6	38	121	147
New York Americans	48	8	29	11	27	99	186

Note: GP = Games played, W = Wins, L = Losses, T = Ties, Pts = Points, GF = Goals for, GA = Goals against
Teams that qualified for the playoffs are highlighted in bold.

== Playoffs ==
=== Playoff bracket ===
The top six teams in the league qualified for the playoffs. The top two teams played in a best-of-seven Stanley Cup semifinal series. The third-place team then met the fourth-place team in one best-of-five series, and the fifth-place team faced the sixth-place team in another best-of-five series, to determine the participants for the other best-of-five semifinal series. The semifinal winners then met in a best-of-seven Stanley Cup Finals (scores in the bracket indicate the number of games won in each series).

Quarterfinals
3	Detroit	2
4	NY Rangers	1
5	Chicago	2
6	Montreal	1

Semifinals
1	Boston	4
2	Toronto	3
3	Detroit	2
5	Chicago	0

Stanley Cup Finals
1	Boston	4
3	Detroit	0

=== Quarterfinals ===
==== (3) Detroit Red Wings vs. (4) New York Rangers ====
March 20	New York Rangers	1–2	OT	Detroit Red Wings	Olympia Stadium	Recap
No scoring		First period		No scoring
No scoring		Second period		14:39 – Carl Liscombe (1)
Lynn Patrick (1) – pp – 04:33		Third period		No scoring
No scoring		First overtime period		12:01 – Gus Giesebrecht (1)
Dave Kerr		Goalie stats		Johnny Mowers

March 23	Detroit Red Wings	1–3	New York Rangers	Madison Square Garden III	Recap
No scoring		First period	18:38 – pp – Babe Pratt (1)
Don Grosso (1) – 03:02		Second period	11:30 – Alex Shibicky (1)
No scoring		Third period	19:31 – Mac Colville (1)
Johnny Mowers		Goalie stats	Dave Kerr

March 25	New York Rangers	2–3	Detroit Red Wings	Olympia Stadium	Recap
Kilby MacDonald (1) – 15:25		First period	11:38 – Bill Jennings (1); 19:48 – Jack Stewart (1)
No scoring		Second period	No scoring
Neil Colville (1) – 19:51		Third period	09:39 – pp – Mud Bruneteau (1)
Dave Kerr		Goalie stats	Johnny Mowers

Detroit won series 2–1

==== (5) Chicago Black Hawks vs. (6) Montreal Canadiens ====
March 20	Montreal Canadiens	1–2	Chicago Black Hawks	Chicago Stadium	Recap
Elmer Lach (1) – 08:14		First period	16:21 – George Allen (1)
No scoring		Second period	No scoring
No scoring		Third period	07:57 – Max Bentley (1)
Bert Gardiner		Goalie stats	Sam LoPresti

March 22	Chicago Black Hawks	3–4	2OT	Montreal Canadiens	Montreal Forum	Recap
Cully Dahlstrom (1) – pp – 02:33		First period		08:01 – Joe Benoit (1); 14:02 – pp – Joe Benoit (2)
Joe Cooper (1) – 03:13		Second period		10:51 – Joe Benoit (3)
Mush March (1) – 10:13		Third period		No scoring
No scoring		Second overtime period		14:03 – Charlie Sands (1)
Sam LoPresti		Goalie stats		Bert Gardiner

March 25	Montreal Canadiens	2–3	Chicago Black Hawks	Chicago Stadium	Recap
No scoring		First period	14:56 – George Allen (2)
Joe Benoit (4) – 18:37; Ray Getliffe (1) – 18:58		Second period	12:11 – Cully Dahlstrom (2)
No scoring		Third period	03:31 – Cully Dahlstrom (3)
Bert Gardiner		Goalie stats	Sam LoPresti

Chicago won series 2–1

=== Semifinals ===
==== (1) Boston Bruins vs. (2) Toronto Maple Leafs ====
March 20	Toronto Maple Leafs	0–3	Boston Bruins	Boston Garden	Recap
No scoring		First period	No scoring
No scoring		Second period	15:33 – Flash Hollett (1)
No scoring		Third period	18:21 – Terry Reardon (1); 19:24 – Eddie Wiseman (1)
Turk Broda		Goalie stats	Frank Brimsek

March 22	Toronto Maple Leafs	5–3	Boston Bruins	Boston Garden	Recap
No scoring		First period	08:13 – Eddie Wiseman (2); 09:47 – Milt Schmidt (1)
Gordie Drillon (1) – 02:33; Reg Hamilton (1) – pp – 07:30; Nick Metz (1) – 15:00; Nick Metz (2) – 15:47		Second period	No scoring
Don Metz (1) – 01:44		Third period	04:00 – Eddie Wiseman (3)
Turk Broda		Goalie stats	Frank Brimsek

March 25	Boston Bruins	2–7	Toronto Maple Leafs	Maple Leaf Gardens	Recap
Milt Schmidt (2) – pp – 13:35		First period	18:03 – Sweeney Schriner (1)
Herb Cain (1) – 05:07		Second period	06:59 – Syl Apps (1); 12:46 – pp – Bucko McDonald (1); 17:36 – pp – Syl Apps (2)
No scoring		Third period	05:26 – Sweeney Schriner (2); 16:43 – Syl Apps (3); 17:05 – Nick Metz (3)
Frank Brimsek		Goalie stats	Turk Broda

March 27	Boston Bruins	2–1	Toronto Maple Leafs	Maple Leaf Gardens	Recap
No scoring		First period	No scoring
Woody Dumart (1) – 07:15		Second period	10:30 – Gordie Drillon (2)
Herb Cain (2) – 08:13		Third period	No scoring
Frank Brimsek		Goalie stats	Turk Broda

March 29	Toronto Maple Leafs	2–1	OT	Boston Bruins	Boston Garden	Recap
Lex Chisholm (1) – 04:58		First period		14:16 – Pat McReavy (1)
No scoring		Second period		No scoring
No scoring		Third period		No scoring
Pete Langelle (1) – 17:37		First overtime period		No scoring
Turk Broda		Goalie stats		Frank Brimsek

April 1	Boston Bruins	2–1	Toronto Maple Leafs	Maple Leaf Gardens	Recap
No scoring		First period	No scoring
No scoring		Second period	No scoring
Bobby Bauer (1) – 10:39; Herb Cain (3) – 12:00		Third period	09:48 – Gordie Drillon (3)
Frank Brimsek		Goalie stats	Turk Broda

April 3	Toronto Maple Leafs	1–2	Boston Bruins	Boston Garden	Recap
Bucko McDonald (2) – 13:28		First period	14:32 – Flash Hollett (2)
No scoring		Second period	No scoring
No scoring		Third period	14:17 – Mel Hill (1)
Turk Broda		Goalie stats	Frank Brimsek

Boston won series 4–3

==== (3) Detroit Red Wings vs. (5) Chicago Black Hawks ====
March 27	Chicago Black Hawks	1–3	Detroit Red Wings	Olympia Stadium	Recap
No scoring		First period	19:59 – pp – Sid Abel (1)
No scoring		Second period	10:15 – Carl Liscombe (2)
Mush March (2) – 05:15		Third period	15:28 – Joe Fisher (1)
Sam LoPresti		Goalie stats	Johnny Mowers

March 30	Detroit Red Wings	2–1	OT	Chicago Black Hawks	Chicago Stadium	Recap
No scoring		First period		No scoring
Alex Motter (1) – pp – 01:25		Second period		04:02 – pp – Doug Bentley (1)
No scoring		Third period		No scoring
Gus Giesebrecht (2) – 09:52		First overtime period		No scoring
Johnny Mowers		Goalie stats		Sam LoPresti

Detroit won series 2–0

=== Stanley Cup Finals ===
April 6	Detroit Red Wings	2–3	Boston Bruins	Boston Garden	Recap
No scoring		First period	13:26 – Eddie Wiseman (4)
No scoring		Second period	14:45 – Milt Schmidt (3)
Carl Liscombe (3) – 10:55; Syd Howe (1) – 17:45		Third period	09:16 – Pat McReavy (2)
Johnny Mowers		Goalie stats	Frank Brimsek

April 8	Detroit Red Wings	1–2	Boston Bruins	Boston Garden	Recap
No scoring		First period	No scoring
No scoring		Second period	No scoring
Mud Bruneteau (2) – 02:41		Third period	13:35 – Terry Reardon (2); 17:35 – Roy Conacher (1)
Johnny Mowers		Goalie stats	Frank Brimsek

April 10	Boston Bruins	4–2	Detroit Red Wings	Olympia Stadium	Recap
Eddie Wiseman (5) – 03:57; Milt Schmidt (4) – 14:07		First period	03:15 – Bill Jennings (2); 07:45 – Sid Abel (2)
Milt Schmidt (5) – 00:59		Second period	No scoring
Art Jackson (1) – pp – 17:20		Third period	No scoring
Frank Brimsek		Goalie stats	Johnny Mowers

April 12	Boston Bruins	3–1	Detroit Red Wings	Olympia Stadium	Recap
No scoring		First period	10:14 – pp – Carl Liscombe (4)
Flash Hollett (3) – pp – 07:42; Bobby Bauer – pp – 08:43; Eddie Wiseman (6) – 19:32		Second period	No scoring
No scoring		Third period	No scoring
Frank Brimsek		Goalie stats	Johnny Mowers

Boston won series 4–0

== Awards ==
Calder Trophy: (Best first-year player)	Johnny Quilty, Montreal Canadiens
Hart Trophy: (Most valuable player)	Bill Cowley, Boston Bruins
Lady Byng Trophy: (Excellence and sportsmanship)	Bobby Bauer, Boston Bruins
O'Brien Cup: (Stanley Cup runners-up)	Detroit Red Wings
Prince of Wales Trophy: (Top regular season record)	Boston Bruins
Vezina Trophy: (Fewest goals allowed)	Turk Broda, Toronto Maple Leafs

=== All-Star teams ===
First Team	Position	Second Team
Turk Broda, Toronto Maple Leafs	G	Frank Brimsek, Boston Bruins
Dit Clapper, Boston Bruins	D	Earl Seibert, Chicago Black Hawks
Wally Stanowski, Toronto Maple Leafs	D	Ott Heller, New York Rangers
Bill Cowley, Boston Bruins	C	Syl Apps, Toronto Maple Leafs
Bryan Hextall, New York Rangers	RW	Bobby Bauer, Boston Bruins
Sweeney Schriner, Toronto Maple Leafs	LW	Woody Dumart, Boston Bruins
Cooney Weiland, Boston Bruins	Coach	Dick Irvin, Montreal Canadiens

== Player statistics ==
=== Scoring leaders ===
Note: GP = Games played, G = Goals, A = Assists, PTS = Points, PIM = Penalties in minutes

PLAYER	TEAM	GP	G	A	PTS	PIM
Bill Cowley	Boston Bruins	46	17	45	62	16
Bryan Hextall	New York Rangers	48	26	18	44	16
Gordie Drillon	Toronto Maple Leafs	42	23	21	44	2
Syl Apps	Toronto Maple Leafs	41	20	24	44	6
Syd Howe	Detroit Red Wings	48	20	24	44	8
Lynn Patrick	New York Rangers	48	20	24	44	12
Neil Colville	New York Rangers	48	14	28	42	28
Eddie Wiseman	Boston Bruins	47	16	24	40	10
Bobby Bauer	Boston Bruins	48	17	22	39	2
Roy Conacher	Boston Bruins	41	24	14	38	7

Source: NHL

=== Leading goaltenders ===
Note: GP = Games played; Min – Minutes played; GA = Goals against; GAA = Goals against average; W = Wins; L = Losses; T = Ties; SO = Shutouts

Player	Team	GP	MIN	GA	GAA	W	L	T	SO
Turk Broda	Toronto Maple Leafs	48	2970	99	2.00	28	14	6	5
Frank Brimsek	Boston Bruins	48	3040	102	2.01	27	8	13	6
Johnny Mowers	Detroit Red Wings	48	3040	102	2.01	21	16	11	4
Dave Kerr	New York Rangers	48	3010	125	2.49	21	19	8	2
Paul Goodman	Chicago Black Hawks	21	1320	55	2.50	7	10	4	2
Bert Gardiner	Montreal Canadiens	42	2600	119	2.75	13	23	6	2
Sam LoPresti	Chicago Black Hawks	27	1670	84	3.02	9	15	3	1
Chuck Rayner	N.Y. Americans	12	773	44	3.42	2	7	3	0
Earl Robertson	N.Y. Americans	36	2260	142	3.77	6	22	8	1

== Coaches ==
- Boston Bruins: Cooney Weiland
- Chicago Black Hawks: Paul Thompson
- Detroit Red Wings: Jack Adams
- Montreal Canadiens: Dick Irvin
- New York Americans: Red Dutton
- New York Rangers: Frank Boucher
- Toronto Maple Leafs: Hap Day

== Debuts ==
The following is a list of players of note who played their first NHL game in 1940–41 (listed with their first team, asterisk(*) marks debut in playoffs):

- Max Bentley, Chicago Black Hawks
- John Mariucci, Chicago Black Hawks
- Joe Carveth, Detroit Red Wings
- Elmer Lach, Montreal Canadiens
- Ken Reardon, Montreal Canadiens
- John Quilty, Montreal Canadiens
- Chuck Rayner, New York Americans
- Bill Juzda, New York Rangers

== Last games ==
The following is a list of players of note that played their last game in the NHL in 1940–41 (listed with their last team):

- Paul Haynes, Montreal Canadiens
- Georges Mantha, Montreal Canadiens
- Hooley Smith, New York Americans
- Charlie Conacher, New York Americans
- Dave Kerr, New York Rangers

== See also ==
- 1940–41 NHL transactions
- List of Stanley Cup champions
- 1940 in sports
- 1941 in sports
