= 1939 Stanley Cup Final =

1939 ice hockey championship series

	1	2	3	4	5	Total
Boston Bruins	2	2*	3	2	3	4
Toronto Maple Leafs	1	3*	1	0	1	1
- * – Denotes overtime period(s)
- Location(s): Boston: Boston Garden (1, 2, 5); Toronto: Maple Leaf Gardens (3, 4)
- Coaches: Boston: Art Ross; Toronto: Dick Irvin
- Captains: Boston: Cooney Weiland; Toronto: Charlie Conacher
- Dates: April 6–16, 1939
- Series-winning goal: Roy Conacher (17:54, second)
- Hall of Famers: Bruins: Bobby Bauer (1996); Frank Brimsek (1966); Dit Clapper (1947); Roy Conacher (1998); Bill Cowley (1968); Woody Dumart (1992); Milt Schmidt (1961); Eddie Shore (1947); Cooney Weiland (1971); Maple Leafs: Syl Apps (1961); Turk Broda (1967); Gordie Drillon (1975); Red Horner (1965); Busher Jackson (1971); Coaches: Dick Irvin (1958, player); Art Ross (1949, player); Officials: Mickey Ion (1961)

The 1939 Stanley Cup Final was contested by the Boston Bruins and the Toronto Maple Leafs. It was Boston's first appearance in the Finals since 1930; Toronto had appeared in the previous year. Boston won the series 4–1 to win their second Stanley Cup. This was the first Stanley Cup Finals to be contested as a best-of-seven series, and every subsequent Stanley Cup Finals have been contested as such.

== Paths to the Finals ==
Boston defeated New York Rangers in a best-of-seven 4–3 to advance to the Finals. The Maple Leafs had to play two best-of three series; winning 2–0 against New York Americans, and 2–1 against the Detroit Red Wings to advance to the Finals.

== Game summaries ==
Frank Brimsek held Toronto to just six goals in the 5 games.

April 6	Toronto Maple Leafs	1–2	Boston Bruins	Boston Garden	Recap
No scoring		First period	16:04 - Woody Dumart (1)
No scoring		Second period	No scoring
Red Horner (1) - 13:54		Third period	16:31 - Bobby Bauer (2)
Turk Broda		Goalie stats	Frank Brimsek

April 9	Toronto Maple Leafs	3–2	OT	Boston Bruins	Boston Garden	Recap
Murph Chamberlain (2) - 8:55; Syl Apps (2) - 9:29		First period		No scoring
No scoring		Second period		15:05 - Roy Conacher (2); 16:18 - Mel Hill (5)
No scoring		Third period		No scoring
Doc Romnes (1)		First overtime period		No scoring
Turk Broda		Goalie stats		Frank Brimsek

April 11	Boston Bruins	3–1	Toronto Maple Leafs	Maple Leaf Gardens	Recap
No scoring		First period	No scoring
No scoring		Second period	No scoring
Bobby Bauer (3) - 1:28; Roy Conacher (3) - 8:12; Jack Crawford (1) - 13:03		Third period	19:11 - Gus Marker (2)
Frank Brimsek		Goalie stats	Turk Broda

April 13	Boston Bruins	2–0	Toronto Maple Leafs	Maple Leaf Gardens	Recap
Roy Conacher (4) - pp - 2:20		First period	No scoring
No scoring		Second period	No scoring
Roy Conacher (5) - 12:55		Third period	No scoring
Frank Brimsek		Goalie stats	Turk Broda

April 16	Toronto Maple Leafs	1–3	Boston Bruins	Boston Garden	Recap
Bingo Kampman (1) - 18:40		First period	11:40 - Mel Hill (6)
No scoring		Second period	17:54 - Roy Conacher (6)
No scoring		Third period	19:23 - Flash Hollett (1)
Turk Broda		Goalie stats	Frank Brimsek

Boston won series 4–1

== Stanley Cup engraving ==
The 1939 Stanley Cup was presented to Bruins captain Cooney Weiland by NHL President Frank Calder following the Bruins 3–1 win over the Maple Leafs in game five.

The following Bruins players and staff had their names engraved on the Stanley Cup

1938–39 Boston Bruins

=== Players ===
Centres

- 5 Ralph Cooney Weiland (Captain)
- 10 Bill Cowley
- 11 Gord Pettinger
- 15 Milt Schmidt
- 16 Pat McReavy*

Wingers

- 4 Charlie Sands
- 6 Ray Getliffe
- 6-16 Robert Red Hamill
- 9 Roy Conacher
- 14 Woody Porky Dumart
- 16-4 Harry Frost
- 17 Bobby Bauer
- 18 Mel Hill

Defencemen

- 2 Eddie Shore
- 3 Bill Flash Hollett
- 4 Terry Reardon*
- 5 Aubrey Dit Clapper
- 5 Jack Shewchuk*
- 8 Jack Portland
- 19 Jack Crawford

Goaltenders

- 1 Frank Brimsek

* Name engraved on Stanley Cup despite not officially qualifying.

=== Coaching and administrative staff ===
- Weston Adams Sr. (President/Owner), Art Ross (Vice President/Manager-Coach)
- Ralph Burkard (Treasurer)
- Frank Ryan (Publicity Director)†
- Win Green (Trainer)†‡
- † Win Green (Trainer), Frank Ryan (Publicity Director) were included on one of the two team pictures but left off the Stanley Cup.
- ‡ Missing from the Stanley Cup, but qualified to be on it.

=== Stanley Cup engraving ===
- * Three players were included on the Stanley Cup, but did not qualify: Pat McReavy (6 games played), Terry Reardon (4 games played), Jack Shewchuk (3 games played). Not one of the three players played in the playoffs. Every player who played for Boston that season was included on the Stanley Cup.
- From 1930 to 1939, except for the 1933 New York Rangers, 1934 Chicago Black Hawks and 1935 Montreal Maroons, every team included their playoff game scores on the Stanley Cup. In 1939, the Boston Bruins were the last team to do this. When the Cup was redone during the 1957–58 season, all playoff game scores were left off the new ring for the cup winners from 1928 to 1940.

== See also ==
- 1938–39 NHL season

== References & notes ==
- NHL (2000). Total Stanley Cup. Dan Diamond & Associates.
- Podnieks, Andrew; Hockey Hall of Fame (2004). Lord Stanley's Cup. Bolton, Ont.: Fenn Pub. pp 12, 50. ISBN 978-1-55168-261-7

Preceded by Chicago Black Hawks; 1938	Boston Bruins; Stanley Cup champions 1939	Succeeded by New York Rangers; 1940
