= 1938–39 Boston Bruins season =

NHL team season

1938–39 Boston Bruins
- Stanley Cup champions
- Prince of Wales Trophy winners
- League: 1st NHL
- 1938–39 record: 36–10–2
- Home record: 20–2–2
- Road record: 16–8–0
- Goals for: 156 (1st)
- Goals against: 76 (1st)

Team information
- General manager: Art Ross
- Coach: Art Ross
- Captain: Cooney Weiland
- Arena: Boston Garden

Team leaders
- Goals: Roy Conacher (26)
- Assists: Bill Cowley (34)
- Points: Bill Cowley (42)
- Penalty minutes: Jack Portland (46)
- Wins: Frank Brimsek (33)
- Goals against average: Frank Brimsek (1.56)

The 1938–39 Boston Bruins season was the Bruins' 15th season in the NHL, and they were coming off of a very successful regular season in 1937–38, winning the American Division with a record of 30–11–7, however, they lost to the Toronto Maple Leafs in the Stanley Cup semi-finals. This season, the Bruins would meet the Maple Leafs in a rematch, and win the series 4–1 to win the Stanley Cup for the second time, and the first time in 10 years.

== Regular season ==
In the off-season, the NHL would lose a franchise, as the Montreal Maroons would fold, leaving the league with seven teams, and eliminating the American and Canadian Division format the league had been using since 1926. The Bruins would make a key acquisition, acquiring Roy Conacher from the Kirkland Lake Hargreaves of the NOHA.

Boston would see goaltender Tiny Thompson get injured during an early season game, forcing the club to sign Frank Brimsek, who played for the Providence Reds of the IAHL. Brimsek stepped in and played great hockey, and when Thompson came back from his injury, the Bruins decided to deal him to the Detroit Red Wings for Norm Smith. Brimsek would help lead the Bruins to 1st place in the NHL standings, as they finished the season with a record of 36–10–2, earning 74 points, their highest point total since the 1929–30 season.

Bill Cowley would lead the team with 42 points, despite missing 14 games due to injuries. His 34 assists were a league high. Rookie Roy Conacher scored an NHL high 26 goals, and added 11 assists to finish with 37 points. Milt Schmidt continued to show improvement, scoring a career high 32 points. Flash Hollett led the Bruins defense with 27 points, as he scored 10 goals and added 17 assists, while Dit Clapper scored 13 goals and 26 points from the blueline.

In goal, rookie Frank Brimsek led the NHL with 33 wins and a 1.56 GAA, earning both the Vezina Trophy and the Calder Memorial Trophy. He also recorded 10 shutouts, which was among the league leaders.

=== Final standings ===
National Hockey League
	GP	W	L	T	GF	GA	Pts
**Boston Bruins**	48	36	10	2	156	76	74
**New York Rangers**	48	26	16	6	149	105	58
**Toronto Maple Leafs**	48	19	20	9	114	107	47
**New York Americans**	48	17	21	10	119	157	44
**Detroit Red Wings**	48	18	24	6	107	128	42
**Montreal Canadiens**	48	15	24	9	115	146	39
Chicago Black Hawks	48	12	28	8	91	132	32

Note: GP = Games played, W = Wins, L = Losses, T = Ties, Pts = Points, GF = Goals for, GA = Goals against
Teams that qualified for the playoffs are highlighted in bold.

=== Record vs. opponents ===
1938–39 NHL Records
Team	BOS	CHI	DET	MTL	NYA	NYR	TOR
Boston	—	8–0	7–1	6–2	5–2–1	5–3	5–2–1
Chicago	0–8	—	1–5–2	4–4	2–4–2	3–4–1	2–3–3
Detroit	1–7	5–1–2	—	4–3–1	3–3–2	2–6	3–4–1
Montreal	2–6	4–4	3–4–1	—	3–2–3	1–4–3	2–4–2
N.Y. Americans	2–5–1	4–2–2	3–3–2	2–3–3	—	2–5–1	4–3–1
N.Y. Rangers	3–5	4–3–1	6–2	4–1–3	5–2–1	—	4–3–1
Toronto	2–5–1	3–2–2	4–3–1	4–2–2	3–4–1	3–4–1	—

== Schedule and results ==
1938–39 regular season
November

Game	Date	Visitor	Score	Home	Record	Pts
1	November 3	Boston Bruins	3–2	Toronto Maple Leafs	1–0–0	2
2	November 6	Boston Bruins	4–1	Detroit Red Wings	2–0–0	4
3	November 13	Boston Bruins	1–2	New York Americans	2–1–0	4
4	November 15	Toronto Maple Leafs	1–1	Boston Bruins	2–1–1	5
5	November 20	Detroit Red Wings	1–4	Boston Bruins	3–1–1	7
6	November 22	New York Rangers	2–4	Boston Bruins	4–1–1	9
7	November 27	New York Americans	2–8	Boston Bruins	5–1–1	11

December

Game	Date	Visitor	Score	Home	Record	Pts
8	December 1	Boston Bruins	0–2	Montreal Canadiens	5–2–1	11
9	December 4	Boston Bruins	5–0	Chicago Black Hawks	6–2–1	13
10	December 6	Chicago Black Hawks	0–2	Boston Bruins	7–2–1	15
11	December 11	Boston Bruins	3–0	New York Rangers	8–2–1	17
12	December 13	Montreal Canadiens	2–3	Boston Bruins	9–2–1	19
13	December 15	Boston Bruins	1–0	Montreal Canadiens	10–2–1	21
14	December 18	Boston Bruins	2–0	Detroit Red Wings	11–2–1	23
15	December 20	New York Americans	0–3	Boston Bruins	12–2–1	25
16	December 25	New York Rangers	1–0	Boston Bruins	12–3–1	25
17	December 27	Toronto Maple Leafs	2–8	Boston Bruins	13–3–1	27
18	December 29	Boston Bruins	2–4	New York Americans	13–4–1	27
19	December 31	Boston Bruins	1–2	New York Rangers	13–5–1	27

January

Game	Date	Visitor	Score	Home	Record	Pts
20	January 1	Detroit Red Wings	1–4	Boston Bruins	14–5–1	29
21	January 3	New York Americans	1–2	Boston Bruins	15–5–1	31
22	January 5	Boston Bruins	2–1	Chicago Black Hawks	16–5–1	33
23	January 7	Boston Bruins	0–2	Toronto Maple Leafs	16–6–1	33
24	January 10	Chicago Black Hawks	1–3	Boston Bruins	17–6–1	35
25	January 17	Toronto Maple Leafs	1–2	Boston Bruins	18–6–1	37
26	January 19	Boston Bruins	0–1	Montreal Canadiens	18–7–1	37
27	January 22	Boston Bruins	5–0	Detroit Red Wings	19–7–1	39
28	January 24	Montreal Canadiens	4–6	Boston Bruins	20–7–1	41
29	January 29	Boston Bruins	3–2	New York Americans	21–7–1	43
30	January 31	New York Americans	2–2	Boston Bruins	21–7–2	44

February

Game	Date	Visitor	Score	Home	Record	Pts
31	February 2	Boston Bruins	2–1	Toronto Maple Leafs	22–7–2	46
32	February 5	Boston Bruins	3–0	Chicago Black Hawks	23–7–2	48
33	February 7	Toronto Maple Leafs	0–2	Boston Bruins	24–7–2	50
34	February 9	Boston Bruins	4–2	New York Rangers	25–7–2	52
35	February 12	New York Rangers	3–2	Boston Bruins	25–8–2	52
36	February 14	Detroit Red Wings	1–2	Boston Bruins	26–8–2	54
37	February 16	Boston Bruins	5–1	Montreal Canadiens	27–8–2	56
38	February 19	Boston Bruins	1–4	Detroit Red Wings	27–9–2	56
39	February 21	Chicago Black Hawks	2–8	Boston Bruins	28–9–2	58
40	February 25	Boston Bruins	0–1	Toronto Maple Leafs	28–10–2	58
41	February 26	Boston Bruins	5–1	Chicago Black Hawks	29–10–2	60
42	February 28	Montreal Canadiens	2–6	Boston Bruins	30–10–2	62

March

Game	Date	Visitor	Score	Home	Record	Pts
43	March 5	New York Rangers	3–5	Boston Bruins	31–10–2	64
44	March 7	Detroit Red Wings	0–3	Boston Bruins	32–10–2	66
45	March 9	Boston Bruins	9–6	New York Americans	33–10–2	68
46	March 12	Boston Bruins	4–2	New York Rangers	34–10–2	70
47	March 14	Chicago Black Hawks	2–4	Boston Bruins	35–10–2	72
48	March 19	Montreal Canadiens	5–7	Boston Bruins	36–10–2	74

Legend: Win (2 points) Loss (0 points) Tie (1 point)

== Playoffs ==
In the playoffs, Boston would have a 1st round bye, advancing straight to the NHL semi-finals, where they would face the 2nd place New York Rangers in a best of 7 series. New York had 58 points during the regular season, which was 16 less than the Bruins. The series opened at Madison Square Garden in New York, and the Bruins would win a thrilling, triple overtime game by a score of 2–1. Game 2 moved to the Boston Garden, and Boston took a 2–0 series lead with a 3–2 overtime victory. The Bruins took a commanding 3–0 lead in the series with a 4–1 win, looking to close out the series in the 4th game, as the series shifted back to New York. The Rangers would hold off elimination, defeating Boston 2–1, and then in game 5 in Boston, the game would be decided in overtime, with New York once again winning by a 2–1 score to cut the series lead to 3–2. Game 6 was played back in New York, and the Rangers easily defeated the Bruins 3–1, to tie the series up at 3 games, forcing a 7th game to be played in Boston. The game would be tied 1–1 after regulation time, and would not be settled until the 3rd overtime period, when Boston finally snapped the tie, winning the game 2–1, and taking the series 4–3, to advance to the Stanley Cup finals.

The Bruins opponent was the Toronto Maple Leafs, who finished the season with a 19–20–9 record, earning 47 points, which was 27 points fewer than Boston. The Leafs defeated the New York Americans and Detroit Red Wings to earn a spot in the best of seven finals. The series would begin with 2 games in Boston, and each team won a game, as the series moved to Maple Leaf Gardens for games three and four. Boston would take control in Toronto, winning game three by a 3–1 score, then shutting out the Leafs 2–0 in game four, to take a 3–1 series lead. Boston then returned home for game five, and defeated Toronto 3–1, to win their first Stanley Cup in 10 years, and second in team history.

1939 Stanley Cup playoffs
Semifinals vs. (2) New York Rangers – Bruins win 4–3

Game	Date	Visitor	Score	Home	Series
1	March 21	Boston Bruins	2–1	New York Rangers	1–0
2	March 23	New York Rangers	2–3	Boston Bruins	2–0
3	March 26	New York Rangers	1–4	Boston Bruins	3–0
4	March 28	Boston Bruins	1–2	New York Rangers	3–1
5	March 30	New York Rangers	2–1	Boston Bruins	3–2
6	April 1	Boston Bruins	1–3	New York Rangers	3–3
7	April 2	New York Rangers	1–2	Boston Bruins	4–3

Stanley Cup Finals vs. (3) Toronto Maple Leafs – Bruins win 4–1

Game	Date	Visitor	Score	Home	Series
1	April 6	Toronto Maple Leafs	1–2	Boston Bruins	1–0
2	April 9	Toronto Maple Leafs	3–2	Boston Bruins	1–1
3	April 11	Boston Bruins	3–1	Toronto Maple Leafs	2–1
4	April 13	Boston Bruins	2–0	Toronto Maple Leafs	3–1
5	April 16	Toronto Maple Leafs	1–3	Boston Bruins	4–1

Legend: Win Loss

== Player statistics ==
=== Regular season ===
Scoring

Player	Pos	GP	G	A	Pts	PIM
Bill Cowley	C	34	8	34	42	2
Roy Conacher	LW	47	26	11	37	12
Milt Schmidt	C/D	41	15	17	32	13
Bobby Bauer	RW	48	13	18	31	4
Woody Dumart	LW	46	14	15	29	2
Flash Hollett	D	44	10	17	27	35
Dit Clapper	RW/D	42	13	13	26	22
Gord Pettinger	C	48	11	14	25	8
Ray Getliffe	C/LW	43	10	12	22	11
Mel Hill	RW	46	10	10	20	16
Eddie Shore	D	44	4	14	18	47
Cooney Weiland	C	45	7	9	16	9
Charlie Sands	C/RW	37	7	5	12	10
Jack Crawford	D	48	4	8	12	12
Jack Portland	D	48	4	5	9	46
Red Hamill	LW	6	0	1	1	0
Frank Brimsek	G	43	0	0	0	0
Harry Frost	RW	4	0	0	0	0
Pat McReavy	C	6	0	0	0	0
Terry Reardon	C/RW	4	0	0	0	0
Jack Shewchuk	D	3	0	0	0	2
Tiny Thompson	G	5	0	0	0	0

Goaltending

Player	MIN	GP	W	L	T	GA	GAA	SO
Frank Brimsek	2610	43	33	9	1	68	1.56	10
Tiny Thompson	310	5	3	1	1	8	1.55	0
Team:	2920	48	36	10	2	76	1.56	10

=== Playoffs ===
Scoring

Player	Pos	GP	G	A	Pts	PIM
Bill Cowley	C	12	3	11	14	2
Roy Conacher	LW	12	6	4	10	12
Mel Hill	RW	12	6	3	9	12
Milt Schmidt	C/D	12	3	3	6	2
Bobby Bauer	RW	12	3	2	5	0
Woody Dumart	LW	12	1	3	4	6
Flash Hollett	D	12	1	3	4	2
Eddie Shore	D	12	0	4	4	19
Jack Crawford	D	12	1	1	2	9
Ray Getliffe	C/LW	11	1	1	2	2
Gord Pettinger	C	12	1	1	2	7
Dit Clapper	RW/D	12	0	1	1	6
Frank Brimsek	G	12	0	0	0	0
Harry Frost	RW	1	0	0	0	0
Red Hamill	LW	12	0	0	0	8
Jack Portland	D	12	0	0	0	11
Charlie Sands	C/RW	1	0	0	0	0
Cooney Weiland	C	12	0	0	0	0

Goaltending

Player	MIN	GP	W	L	GA	GAA	SO
Frank Brimsek	863	12	8	4	18	1.25	1
Team:	863	12	8	4	18	1.25	1

Note:

Pos = Position;GP = Games played; G = Goals; A = Assists; Pts = Points; PIM = Penalty minutes; +/- = Plus/minus; PPG = Power-play goals; SHG = Short-handed goals; GWG = Game-winning goals
Pos = Position;GP = Games played; Min, TOI = Minutes played; W = Wins; L = Losses; T,T/OT = Ties; OTL = Overtime losses; GA = Goals-against; GAA = Goals-against average; SO = Shutouts; SA = Shots against; SV = Shots saved;SV% = Save percentage;

== See also ==
- 1938–39 NHL season
