= 1938–39 Montreal Canadiens season =

NHL hockey team season

1938–39 Montreal Canadiens
- League: 6th NHL
- 1938–39 record: 15–24–9
- Home record: 8–11–5
- Road record: 7–13–4
- Goals for: 115
- Goals against: 146

Team information
- General manager: Cecil Hart
- Coach: Cecil Hart
- Captain: Babe Siebert
- Arena: Montreal Forum

Team leaders
- Goals: Toe Blake (24)
- Assists: Paul Haynes (32)
- Points: Toe Blake (47)
- Penalty minutes: Stewart Evans (58)
- Wins: Claude Bourque (9)
- Goals against average: Claude Bourque (2.65)

The 1938–39 Montreal Canadiens season was the 30th season in club history. The team placed sixth in the regular season to qualify for the playoffs. The Canadiens lost in the first round to the Detroit Red Wings 2 games to 1.

== Regular season ==
=== Final standings ===
National Hockey League
	GP	W	L	T	GF	GA	Pts
**Boston Bruins**	48	36	10	2	156	76	74
**New York Rangers**	48	26	16	6	149	105	58
**Toronto Maple Leafs**	48	19	20	9	114	107	47
**New York Americans**	48	17	21	10	119	157	44
**Detroit Red Wings**	48	18	24	6	107	128	42
**Montreal Canadiens**	48	15	24	9	115	146	39
Chicago Black Hawks	48	12	28	8	91	132	32

Note: GP = Games played, W = Wins, L = Losses, T = Ties, Pts = Points, GF = Goals for, GA = Goals against
Teams that qualified for the playoffs are highlighted in bold.

=== Record vs. opponents ===
1938–39 NHL Records
Team	BOS	CHI	DET	MTL	NYA	NYR	TOR
Boston	—	8–0	7–1	6–2	5–2–1	5–3	5–2–1
Chicago	0–8	—	1–5–2	4–4	2–4–2	3–4–1	2–3–3
Detroit	1–7	5–1–2	—	4–3–1	3–3–2	2–6	3–4–1
Montreal	2–6	4–4	3–4–1	—	3–2–3	1–4–3	2–4–2
N.Y. Americans	2–5–1	4–2–2	3–3–2	2–3–3	—	2–5–1	4–3–1
N.Y. Rangers	3–5	4–3–1	6–2	4–1–3	5–2–1	—	4–3–1
Toronto	2–5–1	3–2–2	4–3–1	4–2–2	3–4–1	3–4–1	—

== Schedule and results ==
1938–39 regular season
November

Game	Result	Date	Score	Opponent	Record
1	L	November 6, 1938	2–3	Chicago Black Hawks (1938–39)	0–1–0
2	L	November 10, 1938	0–2	Toronto Maple Leafs (1938–39)	0–2–0
3	L	November 12, 1938	1–4	@ Toronto Maple Leafs (1938–39)	0–3–0
4	L	November 13, 1938	3–4	@ Chicago Black Hawks (1938–39)	0–4–0
5	L	November 17, 1938	1–7	Detroit Red Wings (1938–39)	0–5–0
6	L	November 20, 1938	1–2	@ New York Rangers (1938–39)	0–6–0
7	L	November 22, 1938	3–7	@ New York Americans (1938–39)	0–7–0
8	T	November 24, 1938	2–2 OT	New York Americans (1938–39)	0–7–1
9	W	November 27, 1938	3–2	@ Detroit Red Wings (1938–39)	1–7–1

December

Game	Result	Date	Score	Opponent	Record
10	W	December 1, 1938	2–0	Boston Bruins (1938–39)	2–7–1
11	W	December 3, 1938	3–1	@ Toronto Maple Leafs (1938–39)	3–7–1
12	L	December 8, 1938	5–6	New York Rangers (1938–39)	3–8–1
13	W	December 11, 1938	4–2	Detroit Red Wings (1938–39)	4–8–1
14	L	December 13, 1938	2–3	@ Boston Bruins (1938–39)	4–9–1
15	L	December 15, 1938	0–1	Boston Bruins (1938–39)	4–10–1
16	L	December 18, 1938	2–5	@ New York Americans (1938–39)	4–11–1
17	L	December 22, 1938	2–5	New York Rangers (1938–39)	4–12–1
18	L	December 25, 1938	1–4	@ Detroit Red Wings (1938–39)	4–13–1
19	L	December 27, 1938	1–4	Chicago Black Hawks (1938–39)	4–14–1

January

Game	Result	Date	Score	Opponent	Record
20	W	January 1, 1939	4–3 OT	@ Chicago Black Hawks (1938–39)	5–14–1
21	T	January 3, 1939	2–2 OT	@ Toronto Maple Leafs (1938–39)	5–14–2
22	T	January 5, 1939	2–2 OT	New York Rangers (1938–39)	5–14–3
23	T	January 8, 1939	1–1 OT	Detroit Red Wings (1938–39)	5–14–4
24	L	January 10, 1939	0–3	@ Detroit Red Wings (1938–39)	5–15–4
25	L	January 12, 1939	4–9	Toronto Maple Leafs (1938–39)	5–16–4
26	T	January 14, 1939	1–1 OT	New York Americans (1938–39)	5–16–5
27	T	January 15, 1939	1–1 OT	@ New York Americans (1938–39)	5–16–6
28	W	January 19, 1939	1–0	Boston Bruins (1938–39)	6–16–6
29	L	January 22, 1939	3–7	@ New York Rangers (1938–39)	6–17–6
30	L	January 24, 1939	4–6	@ Boston Bruins (1938–39)	6–18–6
31	W	January 29, 1939	1–0	@ Chicago Black Hawks (1938–39)	7–18–6

February

Game	Result	Date	Score	Opponent	Record
32	L	February 2, 1939	2–4	Chicago Black Hawks (1938–39)	7–19–6
33	W	February 9, 1939	5–2	New York Americans (1938–39)	8–19–6
34	T	February 11, 1939	3–3 OT	@ Toronto Maple Leafs (1938–39)	8–19–7
35	L	February 12, 1939	3–4	Toronto Maple Leafs (1938–39)	8–20–7
36	L	February 16, 1939	1–5	Boston Bruins (1938–39)	8–21–7
37	W	February 18, 1939	7–2	New York Americans (1938–39)	9–21–7
38	W	February 19, 1939	5–4	@ New York Americans (1938–39)	10–21–7
39	T	February 25, 1939	1–1 OT	New York Rangers (1938–39)	10–21–8
40	W	February 26, 1939	3–0	@ New York Rangers (1938–39)	11–21–8
41	L	February 28, 1939	2–6	@ Boston Bruins (1938–39)	11–22–8

March

Game	Result	Date	Score	Opponent	Record
42	W	March 2, 1939	3–1	Toronto Maple Leafs (1938–39)	12–22–8
43	W	March 5, 1939	2–1 OT	@ Chicago Black Hawks (1938–39)	13–22–8
44	T	March 7, 1939	2–2 OT	@ New York Rangers (1938–39)	13–22–9
45	W	March 9, 1939	3–2	Detroit Red Wings (1938–39)	14–22–9
46	L	March 12, 1939	1–2	@ Detroit Red Wings (1938–39)	14–23–9
47	W	March 16, 1939	5–1	Chicago Black Hawks (1938–39)	15–23–9
48	L	March 19, 1939	5–7 OT	@ Boston Bruins (1938–39)	15–24–9

Legend: Win (2 points) Loss (0 points) Tie (1 point)

== Playoffs ==
The NHL revised its playoff format and six of seven teams qualified for the playoffs. In the first round, the Canadiens would meet Detroit, which had finished in fifth place. They lost in a best of three series in 3 games, or 1–2.

=== Detroit Red Wings vs. Montreal Canadiens ===
Date	Visitor	Home	Score	Record
March 21	Detroit Red Wings	Montreal Canadiens	2–0	1–0
March 23	Montreal Canadiens	Detroit Red Wings	3–7	1–1
March 24	Montreal Canadiens	Detroit Red Wings	0–1	1–2

== Player statistics ==
=== Regular season ===
==== Scoring ====
Player	Pos	GP	G	A	Pts	PIM
Toe Blake	LW	48	24	23	47	10
Paul Haynes	C	47	5	33	38	27
Johnny Gagnon	RW	45	12	22	34	23
Herb Cain	LW	45	13	14	27	26
Lou Trudel	LW	31	8	13	21	2
Rod Lorrain	RW	38	10	9	19	0
Polly Drouin	LW	28	7	11	18	2
Babe Siebert	LW/D	44	9	7	16	36
Bill Summerhill	RW	43	6	10	16	28
Georges Mantha	D/LW	25	5	5	10	6
Walt Buswell	D	46	3	7	10	10
Armand Mondou	LW	34	3	7	10	2
George Brown	C	18	1	9	10	10
Stewart Evans	D	43	2	7	9	58
Jimmy Ward	RW	36	4	3	7	0
Des Smith	D	16	3	3	6	8
Cy Wentworth	D	45	0	3	3	12
Red Goupille	D	18	0	2	2	24
Paul Raymond	RW	11	0	2	2	4
Marcel Tremblay	RW	10	0	2	2	0
Bob Gracie	C/LW	7	0	1	1	4
Claude Bourque	G	25	0	0	0	0
Wilf Cude	G	23	0	0	0	0
Gus Mancuso	RW	2	0	0	0	0
Don Willson	C	4	0	0	0	0

==== Goaltending ====
Player	MIN	GP	W	L	T	GA	GAA	SO
Wilf Cude	1440	23	8	11	4	77	3.21	2
Claude Bourque	1560	25	7	13	5	69	2.65	2
Team:	3000	48	15	24	9	146	2.92	4

=== Playoffs ===
==== Scoring ====
Player	Pos	GP	G	A	Pts	PIM
Rod Lorrain	RW	3	0	3	3	0
Walt Buswell	D	3	2	0	2	2
Toe Blake	LW	3	1	1	2	2
Johnny Gagnon	RW	3	0	2	2	10
Armand Mondou	LW	3	1	0	1	2
Lou Trudel	LW	3	1	0	1	0
Polly Drouin	LW	3	0	1	1	5
Claude Bourque	G	3	0	0	0	0
Herb Cain	LW	3	0	0	0	2
Stewart Evans	D	3	0	0	0	2
Paul Haynes	C	3	0	0	0	4
Georges Mantha	D/LW	3	0	0	0	0
Paul Raymond	RW	3	0	0	0	2
Babe Siebert	LW/D	3	0	0	0	0
Des Smith	D	3	0	0	0	4
Bill Summerhill	RW	2	0	0	0	2
Jimmy Ward	RW	1	0	0	0	0
Cy Wentworth	D	3	0	0	0	4

==== Goaltending ====
Player	MIN	GP	W	L	GA	GAA	SO
Claude Bourque	188	3	1	2	8	2.55	1
Team:	188	3	1	2	8	2.55	1

Note:

Pos = Position;GP = Games played; G = Goals; A = Assists; Pts = Points; PIM = Penalty minutes; +/- = Plus/minus; PPG = Power-play goals; SHG = Short-handed goals; GWG = Game-winning goals
Pos = Position;GP = Games played; Min, TOI = Minutes played; W = Wins; L = Losses; T,T/OT = Ties; OTL = Overtime losses; GA = Goals-against; GAA = Goals-against average; SO = Shutouts; SA = Shots against; SV = Shots saved;SV% = Save percentage;

== See also ==
- 1938–39 NHL season
