= 1938–39 Detroit Red Wings season =

National Hockey League team season

1938–39 Detroit Red Wings
- League: 5th NHL
- 1938–39 record: 18–24–6
- Home record: 14–8–2
- Road record: 4–16–4
- Goals for: 107
- Goals against: 128

Team information
- General manager: Jack Adams
- Coach: Jack Adams
- Captain: Ebbie Goodfellow
- Arena: Detroit Olympia

Team leaders
- Goals: Syd Howe (16)
- Assists: Marty Barry (28)
- Points: Marty Barry (41)
- Penalty minutes: Charlie Conacher (39)
- Wins: Tiny Thompson (16)
- Goals against average: Tiny Thompson (2.50)

The 1938–39 Detroit Red Wings season was the 13th season for the Detroit NHL franchise, seventh as the Red Wings.

== Regular season ==
=== Final standings ===
National Hockey League
	GP	W	L	T	GF	GA	Pts
**Boston Bruins**	48	36	10	2	156	76	74
**New York Rangers**	48	26	16	6	149	105	58
**Toronto Maple Leafs**	48	19	20	9	114	107	47
**New York Americans**	48	17	21	10	119	157	44
**Detroit Red Wings**	48	18	24	6	107	128	42
**Montreal Canadiens**	48	15	24	9	115	146	39
Chicago Black Hawks	48	12	28	8	91	132	32

Note: GP = Games played, W = Wins, L = Losses, T = Ties, Pts = Points, GF = Goals for, GA = Goals against
Teams that qualified for the playoffs are highlighted in bold.

=== Record vs. opponents ===
1938–39 NHL Records
Team	BOS	CHI	DET	MTL	NYA	NYR	TOR
Boston	—	8–0	7–1	6–2	5–2–1	5–3	5–2–1
Chicago	0–8	—	1–5–2	4–4	2–4–2	3–4–1	2–3–3
Detroit	1–7	5–1–2	—	4–3–1	3–3–2	2–6	3–4–1
Montreal	2–6	4–4	3–4–1	—	3–2–3	1–4–3	2–4–2
N.Y. Americans	2–5–1	4–2–2	3–3–2	2–3–3	—	2–5–1	4–3–1
N.Y. Rangers	3–5	4–3–1	6–2	4–1–3	5–2–1	—	4–3–1
Toronto	2–5–1	3–2–2	4–3–1	4–2–2	3–4–1	3–4–1	—

== Schedule and results ==
1938–39 regular season
November

Game	Result	Date	Score	Opponent	Record
1	L	November 6, 1938	1–4	Boston Bruins (1938–39)	0–1–0
2	L	November 10, 1938	1–2	New York Americans (1938–39)	0–2–0
3	L	November 13, 1938	3–4	New York Rangers (1938–39)	0–3–0
4	L	November 15, 1938	0–2	@ New York Rangers (1938–39)	0–4–0
5	W	November 17, 1938	7–1	@ Montreal Canadiens (1938–39)	1–4–0
6	L	November 20, 1938	1–4	@ Boston Bruins (1938–39)	1–5–0
7	W	November 24, 1938	4–2	Chicago Black Hawks (1938–39)	2–5–0
8	L	November 26, 1938	0–5	@ Toronto Maple Leafs (1938–39)	2–6–0
9	L	November 27, 1938	2–3	Montreal Canadiens (1938–39)	2–7–0

December

Game	Result	Date	Score	Opponent	Record
10	W	December 1, 1938	4–1	@ Chicago Black Hawks (1938–39)	3–7–0
11	W	December 4, 1938	1–0	Toronto Maple Leafs (1938–39)	4–7–0
12	T	December 8, 1938	1–1 OT	New York Americans (1938–39)	4–7–1
13	L	December 11, 1938	2–4	@ Montreal Canadiens (1938–39)	4–8–1
14	L	December 13, 1938	1–5	@ New York Americans (1938–39)	4–9–1
15	L	December 18, 1938	0–2	Boston Bruins (1938–39)	4–10–1
16	L	December 20, 1938	2–6	@ New York Rangers (1938–39)	4–11–1
17	T	December 22, 1938	3–3 OT	@ Chicago Black Hawks (1938–39)	4–11–2
18	L	December 24, 1938	0–2	@ Toronto Maple Leafs (1938–39)	4–12–2
19	W	December 25, 1938	4–1	Montreal Canadiens (1938–39)	5–12–2
20	W	December 29, 1938	4–1	Chicago Black Hawks (1938–39)	6–12–2

January

Game	Result	Date	Score	Opponent	Record
21	L	January 1, 1939	1–4	@ Boston Bruins (1938–39)	6–13–2
22	L	January 2, 1939	0–3	@ New York Rangers (1938–39)	6–14–2
23	T	January 5, 1939	6–6 OT	@ New York Americans (1938–39)	6–14–3
24	T	January 8, 1939	1–1 OT	@ Montreal Canadiens (1938–39)	6–14–4
25	W	January 10, 1939	3–0	Montreal Canadiens (1938–39)	7–14–4
26	W	January 15, 1939	1–0	Toronto Maple Leafs (1938–39)	8–14–4
27	W	January 19, 1939	4–3	New York Rangers (1938–39)	9–14–4
28	L	January 22, 1939	0–5	Boston Bruins (1938–39)	9–15–4
29	W	January 26, 1939	1–0	@ Chicago Black Hawks (1938–39)	10–15–4
30	L	January 28, 1939	0–6	@ Toronto Maple Leafs (1938–39)	10–16–4
31	T	January 29, 1939	2–2 OT	Toronto Maple Leafs (1938–39)	10–16–5

February

Game	Result	Date	Score	Opponent	Record
32	W	February 5, 1939	7–3	New York Americans (1938–39)	11–16–5
33	L	February 9, 1939	2–4	Chicago Black Hawks (1938–39)	11–17–5
34	L	February 12, 1939	0–1	@ New York Americans (1938–39)	11–18–5
35	L	February 14, 1939	1–2	@ Boston Bruins (1938–39)	11–19–5
36	T	February 16, 1939	1–1 OT	@ Chicago Black Hawks (1938–39)	11–19–6
37	W	February 19, 1939	4–1	Boston Bruins (1938–39)	12–19–6
38	L	February 21, 1939	3–7	@ New York Rangers (1938–39)	12–20–6
39	L	February 23, 1939	2–4	New York Rangers (1938–39)	12–21–6
40	W	February 26, 1939	5–1	Toronto Maple Leafs (1938–39)	13–21–6

March

Game	Result	Date	Score	Opponent	Record
41	W	March 2, 1939	7–3	New York Americans (1938–39)	14–21–6
42	W	March 5, 1939	4–2	@ New York Americans (1938–39)	15–21–6
43	L	March 7, 1939	0–3	@ Boston Bruins (1938–39)	15–22–6
44	L	March 9, 1939	2–3	@ Montreal Canadiens (1938–39)	15–23–6
45	L	March 11, 1939	1–5	@ Toronto Maple Leafs (1938–39)	15–24–6
46	W	March 12, 1939	2–1	Montreal Canadiens (1938–39)	16–24–6
47	W	March 14, 1939	3–2	New York Rangers (1938–39)	17–24–6
48	W	March 19, 1939	3–2	Chicago Black Hawks (1938–39)	18–24–6

Legend: Win (2 points) Loss (0 points) Tie (1 point)

== Playoffs ==
=== (5) Detroit Red Wings vs. (6) Montreal Canadiens ===
Montreal Canadiens vs Detroit Red Wings
Date	Visitors	Score	Home	Score
Mar 21	Detroit	0	Montreal C.	2
Mar 23	Montreal C.	3	Detroit	7
Mar 26	Montreal C.	0	Detroit	1 (OT)

Detroit wins best-of-three series 2–1.

=== (3) Toronto Maple Leafs vs. (5) Detroit Red Wings ===
Detroit Red Wings vs Toronto Maple Leafs
Date	Visitors	Score	Home	Score
Mar 28	Detroit	1	Toronto	4
Mar 30	Toronto	1	Detroit	3
Apr 1	Detroit	4	Toronto	5 (OT)

Toronto wins best-of-three series 2–1.

== Player statistics ==
=== Regular season ===
Scoring

Player	Pos	GP	G	A	Pts	PIM
Marty Barry	C	48	13	28	41	4
Syd Howe	C/LW	48	16	20	36	11
Carl Liscombe	LW	41	8	18	26	13
Charlie Conacher	RW	40	8	15	23	39
Gus Giesebrecht	C	28	10	10	20	2
Hec Kilrea	LW	48	8	9	17	8
Ebbie Goodfellow	C/D	48	8	8	16	36
Eddie Wares	D/RW	28	8	8	16	10
Herbie Lewis	LW	42	6	10	16	8
Alex Motter	C	44	5	11	16	17
Pete Kelly	RW	32	4	9	13	4
Mud Bruneteau	RW	20	3	7	10	0
Doug Young	D	42	1	5	6	16
Ralph Bowman	D	43	2	3	5	26
Don Deacon	LW	8	1	3	4	2
Sid Abel	C/LW	15	1	1	2	0
Don Grosso	LW/C	1	1	1	2	0
Dave Trottier	LW	11	1	1	2	16
Larry Aurie	RW	1	1	0	1	0
Connie Brown	C	2	1	0	1	0
Jack Keating	LW	1	1	0	1	2
Phil Besler	RW	5	0	1	1	2
Buck Jones	D	11	0	1	1	6
Charley Mason	RW	6	0	1	1	0
Jack Stewart	D	32	0	1	1	18
Eddie Bush	D	8	0	0	0	0
Ken Kilrea	LW	1	0	0	0	0
Bucko McDonald	D	14	0	0	0	2
John Sherf	LW	3	0	0	0	0
Normie Smith	G	4	0	0	0	0
Harvey Teno	G	5	0	0	0	0
Tiny Thompson	G	39	0	0	0	0
Bill Thomson	C/RW	4	0	0	0	0

Goaltending

Player	MIN	GP	W	L	T	GA	GAA	SO
Tiny Thompson	2397	39	16	17	6	101	2.53	4
Harvey Teno	300	5	2	3	0	15	3.00	0
Charlie Conacher	3	1	0	0	0	0	0.00	0
Normie Smith	240	4	0	4	0	12	3.00	0
Team:	2940	48	18	24	6	128	2.61	4

=== Playoffs ===
Scoring

Player	Pos	GP	G	A	Pts	PIM
Charlie Conacher	RW	5	2	5	7	2
Marty Barry	C	6	3	1	4	0
Syd Howe	C/LW	6	3	1	4	4
Don Deacon	LW	2	2	1	3	0
Don Grosso	LW/C	3	1	2	3	7
Hec Kilrea	LW	6	1	2	3	0
Herbie Lewis	LW	6	1	2	3	0
Sid Abel	C/LW	6	1	1	2	2
Ken Kilrea	LW	3	1	1	2	4
Gus Giesebrecht	C	6	0	2	2	0
Doug Young	D	6	0	2	2	4
Eddie Wares	D/RW	6	1	0	1	8
Buck Jones	D	6	0	1	1	10
Alex Motter	C	4	0	1	1	0
Ralph Bowman	D	5	0	0	0	0
Mud Bruneteau	RW	6	0	0	0	0
Ebbie Goodfellow	C/D	6	0	0	0	8
Pete Kelly	RW	4	0	0	0	0
Carl Liscombe	LW	6	0	0	0	2
John Sherf	LW	3	0	0	0	0
Tiny Thompson	G	6	0	0	0	0

Goaltending

Player	MIN	GP	W	L	GA	GAA	SO
Tiny Thompson	374	6	3	3	15	2.41	1
Team:	374	6	3	3	15	2.41	1

Note: GP = Games played; G = Goals; A = Assists; Pts = Points; +/- = Plus-minus PIM = Penalty minutes; PPG = Power-play goals; SHG = Short-handed goals; GWG = Game-winning goals;
MIN = Minutes played; W = Wins; L = Losses; T = Ties; GA = Goals against; GAA = Goals-against average; SO = Shutouts;

== See also ==
- 1938–39 NHL season
