= 1938–39 New York Rangers season =

NHL team season

1938–39 New York Rangers
- League: 2nd NHL
- 1938–39 record: 26–16–6
- Home record: 13–8–3
- Road record: 13–8–3
- Goals for: 149
- Goals against: 105

Team information
- General manager: Lester Patrick
- Coach: Lester Patrick
- Captain: Art Coulter
- Arena: Madison Square Garden

Team leaders
- Goals: Alex Shibicky (24)
- Assists: Ott Heller (23)
- Points: Clint Smith (41)
- Penalty minutes: Muzz Patrick (64)
- Wins: Dave Kerr (26)
- Goals against average: Dave Kerr (2.12)

The 1938–39 New York Rangers season was the franchise's 13th season. New York finished second in the NHL in regular season points with 58, and qualified for the playoffs. In the league semi-finals, the Rangers lost to the Boston Bruins in seven games.

== Regular season ==
=== Final standings ===
National Hockey League
	GP	W	L	T	GF	GA	Pts
**Boston Bruins**	48	36	10	2	156	76	74
**New York Rangers**	48	26	16	6	149	105	58
**Toronto Maple Leafs**	48	19	20	9	114	107	47
**New York Americans**	48	17	21	10	119	157	44
**Detroit Red Wings**	48	18	24	6	107	128	42
**Montreal Canadiens**	48	15	24	9	115	146	39
Chicago Black Hawks	48	12	28	8	91	132	32

Note: GP = Games played, W = Wins, L = Losses, T = Ties, Pts = Points, GF = Goals for, GA = Goals against
Teams that qualified for the playoffs are highlighted in bold.

=== Record vs. opponents ===
1938–39 NHL Records
Team	BOS	CHI	DET	MTL	NYA	NYR	TOR
Boston	—	8–0	7–1	6–2	5–2–1	5–3	5–2–1
Chicago	0–8	—	1–5–2	4–4	2–4–2	3–4–1	2–3–3
Detroit	1–7	5–1–2	—	4–3–1	3–3–2	2–6	3–4–1
Montreal	2–6	4–4	3–4–1	—	3–2–3	1–4–3	2–4–2
N.Y. Americans	2–5–1	4–2–2	3–3–2	2–3–3	—	2–5–1	4–3–1
N.Y. Rangers	3–5	4–3–1	6–2	4–1–3	5–2–1	—	4–3–1
Toronto	2–5–1	3–2–2	4–3–1	4–2–2	3–4–1	3–4–1	—

== Schedule and results ==
1938–39 regular season
November: 5–2–0 (home: 3–1–0; road: 2–1–0)

Game	November	Opponent	Score	Record
1	13	@ Detroit Red Wings	4–3	1–0–0
2	15	Detroit Red Wings	2–0	2–0–0
3	17	@ Chicago Black Hawks	1–0	3–0–0
4	20	Montreal Canadiens	2–1	4–0–0
5	22	@ Boston Bruins	4–2	4–1–0
6	24	Toronto Maple Leafs	6–2	5–1–0
7	27	Chicago Black Hawks	1–0	5–2–0

December: 7–3–1 (home: 2–2–1; road: 5–1–0)

Game	December	Opponent	Score	Record
8	4	@ New York Americans	6–1	6–2–0
9	8	@ Montreal Canadiens	6–5	7–2–0
10	11	Boston Bruins	3–0	7–3–0
11	15	New York Americans	1 – 1 OT	7–3–1
12	17	@ Toronto Maple Leafs	3–2	8–3–1
13	18	@ Chicago Black Hawks	5–0	8–4–1
14	20	Detroit Red Wings	6–2	9–4–1
15	22	@ Montreal Canadiens	5–2	10–4–1
16	25	@ Boston Bruins	1–0	11–4–1
17	26	Toronto Maple Leafs	2–0	11–5–1
18	31	Boston Bruins	2 – 1 OT	12–5–1

January: 5–3–2 (home: 5–1–0; road: 0–2–2)

Game	January	Opponent	Score	Record
19	2	Detroit Red Wings	3–0	13–5–1
20	5	@ Montreal Canadiens	2 – 2 OT	13–5–2
21	8	New York Americans	5–2	14–5–2
22	10	@ New York Americans	1 – 0 OT	14–6–2
23	12	Chicago Black Hawks	6–0	15–6–2
24	15	@ Chicago Black Hawks	1 – 1 OT	15–6–3
25	19	@ Detroit Red Wings	4–3	15–7–3
26	22	Montreal Canadiens	7–3	16–7–3
27	26	New York Americans	1–0	16–8–3
28	31	Chicago Black Hawks	3–2	17–8–3

February: 6–3–2 (home: 2–2–1; road: 4–1–1)

Game	February	Opponent	Score	Record
29	2	@ New York Americans	7–0	18–8–3
30	4	@ Toronto Maple Leafs	4–2	19–8–3
31	5	Toronto Maple Leafs	5 – 5 OT	19–8–4
32	9	Boston Bruins	4–2	19–9–4
33	12	@ Boston Bruins	3–2	20–9–4
34	16	New York Americans	2–1	21–9–4
35	18	@ Toronto Maple Leafs	2–1	21–10–4
36	21	Detroit Red Wings	7–3	22–10–4
37	23	@ Detroit Red Wings	4–2	23–10–4
38	25	@ Montreal Canadiens	1 – 1 OT	23–10–5
39	26	Montreal Canadiens	3–0	23–11–5

March: 3–5–1 (home: 1–2–1; road: 2–3–0)

Game	March	Opponent	Score	Record
40	2	Chicago Black Hawks	3–1	23–12–5
41	5	@ Boston Bruins	5 – 3 OT	23–13–5
42	7	Montreal Canadiens	2 – 2 OT	23–13–6
43	9	@ Chicago Black Hawks	8–3	24–13–6
44	12	Boston Bruins	4–2	24–14–6
45	14	@ Detroit Red Wings	3–2	24–15–6
46	16	@ New York Americans	11–5	25–15–6
47	18	@ Toronto Maple Leafs	2–1	25–16–6
48	19	Toronto Maple Leafs	6–2	26–16–6

Legend: Win (2 points) Loss (0 points) Tie (1 point)

== Playoffs ==
1939 Stanley Cup playoffs
Semifinals vs. (1) Boston Bruins – Boston wins 4–3

Game	Date	Visitor	Score	Home	OT	Series
1	March 21	Boston Bruins	2–1	New York Rangers	OT	Boston leads series 1–0
2	March 23	New York Rangers	2–3	Boston Bruins	OT	Boston leads series 2–0
3	March 25	New York Rangers	1–4	Boston Bruins		Boston leads series 3–0
4	March 28	Boston Bruins	1–2	New York Rangers		Boston leads series 3–1
5	March 30	New York Rangers	2–1	Boston Bruins	OT	Boston leads series 3–2
6	April 1	Boston Bruins	1–3	New York Rangers		Series tied 3–3
7	April 2	New York Rangers	1–2	Boston Bruins	OT	Boston wins series 4–3

Legend: Win Loss

== Player statistics ==
Skaters

Regular season
Player	GP	G	A	Pts	PIM
Clint Smith	48	21	20	41	2
Neil Colville	47	18	19	37	12
Phil Watson	48	15	22	37	42
Bryan Hextall	48	20	15	35	18
Alex Shibicky	48	24	9	33	24
Wilbert Hiller	48	10	19	29	22
Lynn Patrick	35	8	21	29	25
Mac Colville	48	7	21	28	26
Cecil Dillon	48	12	15	27	6
Ehrhardt Heller	48	0	23	23	42
Walter Pratt	48	2	19	21	20
George Allen	19	6	6	12	10
Arthur Coulter	44	4	8	12	58
Murray Patrick	48	1	10	11	64
Joe Krol	1	1	1	2	0
Bill Carse	1	0	1	1	0
Larry Molyneaux	43	0	1	1	18

Playoffs
Player	GP	G	A	Pts	PIM
Alex Shibicky	7	3	1	4	2
Walter Pratt	7	1	2	3	9
Mac Colville	7	1	2	3	4
Clint Smith	7	1	2	3	0
Bill Carse	6	1	1	2	0
Arthur Coulter	7	1	1	2	6
Lynn Patrick	7	1	1	2	0
Phil Watson	7	1	1	2	7
Neil Colville	7	0	2	2	2
Murray Patrick	7	1	0	1	17
Ehrhardt Heller	7	0	1	1	10
Wilbert Hiller	7	1	0	1	9
Bryan Hextall	7	0	1	1	4
George Allen	7	0	0	0	4
Cecil Dillon	1	0	0	0	0

Goaltenders

Regular season
Player	GP	TOI	W	L	T	GA	GAA	SO
Dave Kerr	48	2970	26	16	6	105	2.12	6

Playoffs
Player	GP	TOI	W	L	GA	GAA	SO
Bert Gardiner	6	433	3	3	12	1.66	0
Dave Kerr	1	119	0	1	2	1.01	0

^{†}Denotes player spent time with another team before joining Rangers. Stats reflect time with Rangers only.
^{‡}Traded mid-season. Stats reflect time with Rangers only.

Note:

Pos = Position;GP = Games played; G = Goals; A = Assists; Pts = Points; PIM = Penalty minutes; +/- = Plus/minus; PPG = Power-play goals; SHG = Short-handed goals; GWG = Game-winning goals
Pos = Position;GP = Games played; Min, TOI = Minutes played; W = Wins; L = Losses; T,T/OT = Ties; OTL = Overtime losses; GA = Goals-against; GAA = Goals-against average; SO = Shutouts; SA = Shots against; SV = Shots saved;SV% = Save percentage;
