= Cooney Weiland =

Canadian ice hockey player (1904–1985)

- Hockey Hall of Fame, 1971
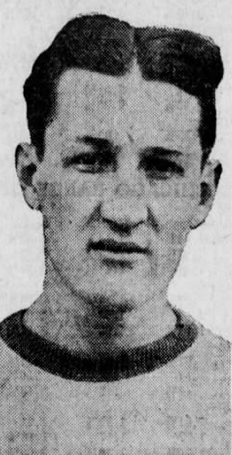
- Born: November 5, 1904 Egmondville, Ontario, Canada
- Died: July 3, 1985 (aged 80) Boston, Massachusetts, U.S.
- Height: 5 ft 7 in (170 cm)
- Weight: 155 lb (70 kg; 11 st 1 lb)
- Position: Centre
- Shot: Left
- Played for: Boston Bruins; Ottawa Senators; Detroit Red Wings
- Playing career: 1925–1939

Ralph "Cooney" Weiland (November 5, 1904 – July 3, 1985) was a Canadian ice hockey forward who played for the Boston Bruins, Ottawa Senators, and Detroit Red Wings of the National Hockey League (NHL). Weiland was part of the Bruins' 1928 "Dynamite Line" with Dutch Gainor and Dit Clapper, one of the earliest nicknamed forward lines in NHL history. He was born in Egmondville, Ontario, but grew up in Seaforth, Ontario.

== Early life ==
Weiland born to Henry Weiland and Sarah Beatty in Egmondville on Nov. 5, 1904. Growing up he was the second youngest of out of eight children His father was a cooper for Seaforth’s Ament Cooperage, two of his older brothers died during World War I. He grew up skating at a local rink where started to develop his hockey skills at an early age, during this time he developed the nickname ‘Cooney’.

== Playing career ==
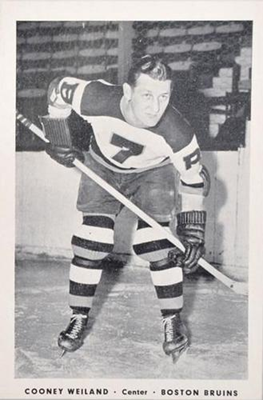
1938 card of Weiland for Boston Bruins

Weiland began playing junior hockey in Seaforth, where he spent three seasons with his hometown team. In 1923 he moved to Owen Sound, Ontario to attend school, planning a career as a druggist. He joined that city's junior team, the Owen Sound Greys, and led them to the 1924 Memorial Cup as Canadian champions. He was the club's top scorer with 68 goals in 25 games.

After the Greys lost the 1925 OHA final to Toronto Aura Lee, Weiland began a three-year stint with the Minneapolis Millers of the old American Hockey Association. That led to the start of his NHL career with Boston, where he celebrated his rookie campaign in 1928–29 with a Stanley Cup victory over the New York Rangers. It was the first Cup win in Bruins history.

In his second season during 1929–30, he was part of the Boston's "Dynamite Line" with Dutch Gainor and Dit Clapper. He scored a career best 43 goals and 73 points in 44 games. That year, the NHL allowed forward passing for the first time, but it did not create its offsides rule until December 1929. Weiland flourished under those conditions, capturing the leagues scoring title and shattering the NHL's single-season points record of 51 which had been set two years earlier by Montreal Canadiens legend Howie Morenz. Weiland held the record alone until 1942–43, when Doug Bentley of the Chicago Black Hawks tied it, and shared it for one more year—Boston's Herb Cain broke the record with 82 points in 1943–44.

Weiland scored four goals in Boston's 7–0 victory over the Pittsburgh Pirates on February 25, 1930, becoming the third Bruin to achieve the feat.

Weiland and the "Dynamite Line" continued to their dominance returning to the Stanley Cup Final again in 1930 but were swept by Montreal. The Dynamite Line was broken up in 1932 when Weiland was traded to the Ottawa Senators due to conflicts with coach Art Ross. He had a brief career with Ottawa leading the team in scoring during the 1932-33 season. However, once the Great Depression hit, Senators owner Frank Ahearn was forced to sell Weiland to the Detroit Red Wings. In Detroit, he was paired with talented wingers Larry Aurie and Herbie Lewis putting up the best numbers of his career since his time in Boston. He helped the Red Wings reach their first Stanley Cup Final in 1934. One of his fellow Red Wings that year was Teddy Graham, an old teammate from the 1924 Greys. Weiland returned to Boston in 1935, and was named team captain in 1937. Weiland retired in 1939, with 173 goals and 333 points in 510 career games. But he ended his NHL playing career as he had begun it; helping the Bruins defeat the Toronto Maple Leafs to earn his and the team's second Stanley Cup.

One sports writer described Weiland as “a magician with the puck,” “one of the slickest players of his era” who “tormented opposing defences with his trickery.” Cooney Weiland was also an inspiration to hundreds of teammates and players.

In 2023, he was named one of the top 100 Bruins players of all time.

== Coaching career ==
=== Boston Bruins ===
After winning the Stanley Cup in 1939, Art Ross ceded the role of Bruins head coach to Weiland. During his first season behind the bench he coached the Bruins to a first place finish, before falling in the Semifinals. However the following year he piloted Boston to another first place finish along with capturing their third Cup in 1940–41. For his work behind the bench he was named a First team All-Star as a coach. Weiland then helmed the Hershey Bears of the American Hockey League for the next four seasons, then coached the league's New Haven entry for two more years.

=== Harvard ===
In 1950, he began his longest coaching stint, at Harvard University. A member of the Beanpot Hall of Fame, Weiland was twice named coach of the year by the American Hockey Coaches Association, first in 1955, when he led the Crimson to third place in the NCAA tournament, and again in his final season, when his team captured the ECAC tournament. The New England Hockey Writers Association named Weiland its coach of the year five times and honored him with the Schaefer Pen Award for contribution to amateur hockey in 1962. In 1955 and 1971 he was named Spencer Penrose Award winner as the best coach in the nation. A year later He received the Lester Patrick Award for contribution to hockey in the United States in 1972.

Weiland coached Harvard to the first ever Beanpot championship in 1952, the program would win 4 more during his tenure.

Weiland coached seven All-Americans, including three-time first-team selection Joe Cavanagh '71 and two-time pick David Johnston '63. His players earned a total of 26 first team All-Ivy honors, highlighted by the 1956–57 team, which was made up entirely of Crimson players. In total he compiled a record of 315-173-17 before retiring in 1971. That year also marked his induction into the Hockey Hall of Fame. By the end of his tenure he coached the program to 7 NCAA tournament appearances, two ECAC tournament titles, one regular season title and six Ivy League championships.

Four of Weiland's Harvard players helped the 1960 U.S. Olympic team win the gold medal in Squaw Valley. Among that group was Bill Cleary '56, who went on to assist Weiland and succeed him as head coach. Cleary served in that role for 19 seasons and as athletic director for 11.

Cufflinks presented to Weiland after Owen Sound's Memorial Cup win in 1924 are part of a permanent junior hockey exhibit at the Hockey Hall of Fame in Toronto.

In 2006 Weiland was awarded the Hobey Baker Legend of College Hockey award, as one of the all-time great contributors to the game of college hockey. Current Harvard coach Ted Donato accepted recognition in Weiland’s honor.

One of his former players, Governor-General David Johnston, believed that he “was a great teacher” “who had a passion for hockey.” Weiland “related to the whole person he was teaching.” Weiland “never gave us pep talks as we went out to start a game.” Weiland would tell his players “if you’ve been listening to what I’ve been telling during the week, you’re going to go out and do it.”

=== Retirement ===
Weiland married his wife Gertrude Hussey in March 1929, the two were married for 57 years. They remained in the Massachusetts area until his death in 1985.

== Career statistics ==
			Regular season					Playoffs
Season	Team	League	GP	G	A	Pts	PIM	GP	G	A	Pts	PIM
1921–22	Seaforth Highlanders	OHA-Jr.	—	—	—	—	—	—	—	—	—	—
1922–23	Owen Sound Jr. Greys	OHA-Jr.	—	—	—	—	—	—	—	—	—	—
1923–24	Owen Sound Jr. Greys	Exhib.	9	33	5	38	—	—	—	—	—	—
1923–24	Owen Sound Jr. Greys	M-Cup	—	—	—	—	—	—	—	—	—	—
1924–25	Minneapolis Rockets	USAHA	35	8	0	8	—	—	—	—	—	—
1925–26	Minneapolis Millers	CHL	26	10	4	14	20	—	—	—	—	—
1926–27	Minneapolis Millers	AHA	36	21	2	23	30	—	—	—	—	—
1927–28	Minneapolis Millers	AHA	40	21	5	26	34	—	—	—	—	—
1928–29	Boston Bruins	NHL	42	11	7	18	16	5	2	0	2	2
1929–30	Boston Bruins	NHL	44	43	30	73	27	6	1	5	6	2
1930–31	Boston Bruins	NHL	44	25	13	38	14	5	6	3	9	2
1931–32	Boston Bruins	NHL	46	14	12	26	20	—	—	—	—	—
1932–33	Ottawa Senators	NHL	48	16	11	27	4	—	—	—	—	—
1933–34	Ottawa Senators	NHL	9	2	0	2	4	—	—	—	—	—
1933–34	Detroit Red Wings	NHL	39	11	19	30	6	9	2	2	4	4
1934–35	Detroit Red Wings	NHL	48	13	25	38	10	—	—	—	—	—
1935–36	Boston Bruins	NHL	48	13	14	27	15	2	1	0	1	2
1936–37	Boston Bruins	NHL	48	6	9	15	6	3	0	0	0	0
1937–38	Boston Bruins	NHL	48	11	12	23	16	3	0	0	0	0
1938–39	Boston Bruins	NHL	47	7	9	16	9	12	0	0	0	0
NHL totals			509	173	160	333	147	45	12	10	22	12

== Head coaching record ==
=== NHL ===
Team	Year	Regular season						Postseason			
Team	Year	G	W	L	T	Pts	Finish	W	L	Win %	Result
BOS	1939–40	48	31	12	5	67	1st in NHL	2	4	.333	Lost in semifinals (NYR)
BOS	1940–41	48	27	8	13	67	1st in NHL	8	3	.727	Won Stanley Cup (DET)
NHL Total		96	58	20	18			10	7	.588	2 playoff appearances 1 Stanley Cup title

=== College ===
Record table
Season	Team	Overall	Conference	Standing	Postseason
Harvard Crimson (Pentagonal League) (1950–1955)
1950–51	Harvard	12-11-0			
1951–52	Harvard	8-11-0			
1952–53	Harvard	11-5-1			NCAA Consolation Game (Loss)
1953–54	Harvard	10-10-2			
1954–55	Harvard	17-3-1			NCAA Consolation Game (Win)
Harvard Crimson Independent (1955–1961)
1955–56	Harvard	15-10-0			
1956–57	Harvard	21-5-0			NCAA Consolation Game (Loss)
1957–58	Harvard	18-10-1			NCAA Consolation Game (Loss)
1958–59	Harvard	12-9-4			
1959–60	Harvard	16-7-1			
1960–61	Harvard	18-4-2			
Harvard:		158-85-12			
Harvard Crimson (ECAC Hockey) (1961–1971)
1961–62	Harvard	21-5-0	18-2-0	2nd	ECAC Third-place game (Win)
1962–63	Harvard	21-3-2	17-3-2	1st	ECAC Tournament Champion
1963–64	Harvard	17-7-0	15-6-0	4th	ECAC Quarterfinals
1964–65	Harvard	9-15-0	7-13-0	11th	
1965–66	Harvard	10-12-1	8-11-0	9th	
1966–67	Harvard	11-12-0	10-11-0	9th	ECAC Quarterfinals
1967–68	Harvard	15-9-0	14-7-0	4th	ECAC Quarterfinals
1968–69	Harvard	19-8-1	16-5-0	3rd	NCAA Consolation Game (Win)
1969–70	Harvard	16-9-0	14-6-0	4th	ECAC Third-place game (Loss)
1970–71	Harvard	18-8-1	15-5-1	4th	NCAA Consolation Game (Loss)
Harvard:		157-88-5	134-69-3		
Total:		315-173-17			
National champion Postseason invitational champion Conference regular season champion Conference regular season and conference tournament champion Division regular season champion Division regular season and conference tournament champion Conference tournament champion

== Awards and achievements ==
=== As a player ===
- Stanley Cup Champion (1929, 1939)
- NHL scoring Champion (1929-30)
- Named one of the top 100 best Bruins players of all time
- Inducted into the Hockey Hall of Fame in 1971

=== As a coach ===
- Stanley Cup Champion (1941)
- First team All-Star (1940-41)
- Spencer Penrose Award (1955, 1971)
- Lester Patrick Award (1972)
- Schaefer Pen Award (1962)
- ECAC Champion (1963, 1971)
- ECAC regular season champion (1963)
- Beanpot Hall of Fame
- Hobey Baker Legends of College Hockey Award (2006)

Sporting positions
Preceded by Red Beattie	Boston Bruins captain 1937–39	Succeeded by Dit Clapper
Preceded by Ace Bailey	NHL Scoring Champion; 1930	Succeeded by Howie Morenz
Preceded by Art Ross	Head coach of the Boston Bruins; 1939–41	Succeeded by Art Ross
Awards and achievements
Preceded by Vic Heyliger; John MacInnes	Spencer Penrose Award; 1954–55; 1970–71	Succeeded by William Harrison; John Kelley
Preceded by Murray Williamson	Hobey Baker Legends of College Hockey Award; 2006	Succeeded by Ed Saugestad
