= Polly Drouin =

Canadian ice hockey player

- Born: January 16, 1908 Verdun, Quebec, Canada
- Died: January 1, 1968 (aged 59)
- Height: 5 ft 7 in (170 cm)
- Weight: 160 lb (73 kg; 11 st 6 lb)
- Position: Left wing
- Shot: Left
- Played for: Montreal Canadiens
- Playing career: 1935–1947

Armand Alphonse Paul Emile "Polly" Drouin (January 25, 1916 – January 1, 1968) was a Canadian professional ice hockey player. He played 157 games in the National Hockey League for the Montreal Canadiens from 1935 to 1941. He was born in Verdun, Quebec.

== Career statistics ==
=== Regular season and playoffs ===
			Regular season					Playoffs
Season	Team	League	GP	G	A	Pts	PIM	GP	G	A	Pts	PIM
1931–32	Ottawa Primrose	OCJHL	15	6	3	9	8	4	0	1	1	0
1932–33	Ottawa Primrose	OCJHL	15	5	3	8	6	4	2	1	3	6
1933–34	Hull Lasalle Juniors	OCJHL	16	20	18	38	47	4	4	3	7	4
1933–34	Hull Lasalle	OCHL	1	0	0	0	0	—	—	—	—	—
1934–35	Ottawa Senators	OCHL	20	10	7	17	8	8	2	0	2	20
1935–36	Montreal Canadiens	NHL	30	1	8	9	19	—	—	—	—	—
1935–36	Ottawa Senators	OCHL	12	7	7	14	12	—	—	—	—	—
1936–37	Montreal Canadiens	NHL	5	0	0	0	0	—	—	—	—	—
1936–37	New Haven Eagles	IAHL	27	10	13	23	33	—	—	—	—	—
1937–38	Montreal Canadiens	NHL	31	7	13	20	8	1	0	0	0	0
1938–39	Montreal Canadiens	NHL	28	7	11	18	2	3	0	1	1	5
1939–40	Montreal Canadiens	NHL	42	4	12	16	51	—	—	—	—	—
1939–40	New Haven Eagles	IAHL	7	1	6	7	0	—	—	—	—	—
1940–41	Montreal Canadiens	NHL	21	4	7	11	0	1	0	0	0	0
1940–41	New Haven Eagles	AHL	19	8	4	12	8	2	0	1	1	0
1941–42	Washington Lions	AHL	56	23	21	44	31	2	0	2	2	0
1942–43	Ottawa Commanders	QSHL	29	22	14	36	31	—	—	—	—	—
1942–43	Ottawa RCAF Flyers	QSHL	11	10	19	29	6	—	—	—	—	—
1945–46	Hull Volants	QSHL	13	8	13	21	10	—	—	—	—	—
1945–46	Ottawa Quarter-Masters	OCHL	—	—	—	—	—	4	6	14	20	—
1946–47	Saint-Hyacinthe Gaulois	QPHL	40	24	30	54	20	4	0	1	1	5
1946–47	Hull Volants	QSHL	—	—	—	—	—	—	—	—	—	—
NHL totals			157	23	51	74	80	5	0	1	1	5
