= Harvey Teno =

Canadian ice hockey player (1915–1990)

- Born: February 15, 1915 Windsor, Ontario, Canada
- Died: September 9, 1990 (aged 75)
- Height: 5 ft 7 in (170 cm)
- Weight: 175 lb (79 kg; 12 st 7 lb)
- Position: Goaltender
- Caught: Left
- Played for: Detroit Red Wings
- Playing career: 1934–1948

Harvey George "Harvie" Teno (February 15, 1915 – September 9, 1990) was a Canadian ice hockey player who played five games in the National Hockey League with the Detroit Red Wings during the 1938–39 season. The rest of his career, which lasted from 1934 to 1948, was spent in various minor leagues.

== Career statistics ==
=== Regular season and playoffs ===
			Regular season								Playoffs
Season	Team	League	GP	W	L	T	Min	GA	SO	GAA	GP	W	L	T	Min	GA	SO	GAA
1932–33	Windsor Wanderers	MOHL	16	—	—	—	1080	55	1	3.06	—	—	—	—	—	—	—	—
1933–34	St. Michael's Majors	OHA	11	—	—	—	660	30	1	2.73	3	—	—	—	180	9	0	3.00
1933–34	St. Michael's Majors	M-Cup	—	—	—	—	—	—	—	—	13	13	0	0	780	27	3	2.08
1934–35	St. Michael's Majors	OHA	11	—	—	—	660	34	1	3.09	3	—	—	—	180	8	1	2.67
1934–35	Toronto Dominions	TIHL	15	—	—	—	900	54	0	3.60	3	—	—	—	180	23	0	7.67
1935–36	Oakville Villans	OHA Sr	17	—	—	—	1020	53	1	3.12	2	—	—	—	120	7	0	3.50
1935–36	Toronto McColl-Frontenacs	TIHL	14	—	—	—	840	43	1	3.07	4	—	—	—	240	17	0	4.25
1936–37	Atlantic City Sea Gulls	EAHL	48	27	19	2	2880	116	4	2.43	4	1	3	0	240	10	0	2.40
1937–38	Atlantic City Sea Gulls	EAHL	57	28	26	3	3420	168	3	2.94	—	—	—	—	—	—	—	—
1938–39	Detroit Red Wings	NHL	5	2	3	0	300	15	0	3.00	—	—	—	—	—	—	—	—
1938–39	Philadelphia Ramblers	IAHL	2	0	1	1	130	11	0	5.08	4	1	3	—	240	9	1	2.25
1938–39	Hershey Bears	IAHL	1	0	0	1	70	4	0	3.43	—	—	—	—	—	—	—	—
1938–39	Pittsburgh Hornets	IAHL	20	6	13	1	1200	58	0	2.90	—	—	—	—	—	—	—	—
1939–40	Pittsburgh Hornets	IAHL	56	25	22	9	3480	133	4	2.29	9	4	5	—	563	24	1	2.56
1940–41	Pittsburgh Hornets	AHL	24	9	12	2	1408	63	2	2.68	6	3	3	—	426	12	0	1.69
1940–41	Cleveland Barons	AHL	6	3	2	1	370	13	0	2.11	—	—	—	—	—	—	—	—
1940–41	Buffalo Bisons	AHL	1	0	0	1	70	3	0	2.57	—	—	—	—	—	—	—	—
1941–42	Pittsburgh Hornets	AHL	53	22	26	5	3280	209	0	3.82	—	—	—	—	—	—	—	—
1942–43	Pittsburgh Hornets	AHL	52	25	21	6	3220	184	2	3.43	2	0	2	—	130	10	0	4.62
1943–44	Pittsburgh Hornets	AHL	6	1	4	1	360	19	0	3.17	—	—	—	—	—	—	—	—
1944–45	Cleveland Barons	AHL	55	31	15	9	3300	178	4	3.23	12	8	4	—	730	39	0	3.21
1945–46	Cleveland Barons	AHL	21	10	9	2	1260	94	1	4.48	12	7	5	—	755	50	1	3.97
1946–47	Minneapolis Millers	USHL	13	7	6	0	780	41	2	3.15	—	—	—	—	—	—	—	—
1947–48	Hershey Bears	AHL	—	—	—	—	—	—	—	—	2	0	2	—	100	6	0	3.60
IAHL/AHL totals			297	132	125	39	18,148	969	13	3.20	47	23	24	—	2,944	150	3	3.06
NHL totals			5	2	3	0	300	15	0	3.00	—	—	—	—	—	—	—	—
