= 1938–39 New York Americans season =

National Hockey League team season

1938–39 New York Americans
- League: 4th NHL
- 1938–39 record: 17–21–10
- Home record: 12–8–4
- Road record: 5–13–6
- Goals for: 119
- Goals against: 157

Team information
- Coach: Red Dutton
- Captain: Sweeney Schriner
- Arena: Madison Square Garden

Team leaders
- Goals: Lorne Carr (19)
- Assists: Sweeney Schriner (31)
- Points: Sweeney Schriner (44)
- Penalty minutes: Joe Jerwa (52)
- Wins: Earl Robertson (17)
- Goals against average: Earl Robertson (2.86)

The 1938–39 New York Americans season was the Americans' 14th season of play.

== Regular season ==
=== Final standings ===
National Hockey League
	GP	W	L	T	GF	GA	Pts
**Boston Bruins**	48	36	10	2	156	76	74
**New York Rangers**	48	26	16	6	149	105	58
**Toronto Maple Leafs**	48	19	20	9	114	107	47
**New York Americans**	48	17	21	10	119	157	44
**Detroit Red Wings**	48	18	24	6	107	128	42
**Montreal Canadiens**	48	15	24	9	115	146	39
Chicago Black Hawks	48	12	28	8	91	132	32

Note: GP = Games played, W = Wins, L = Losses, T = Ties, Pts = Points, GF = Goals for, GA = Goals against
Teams that qualified for the playoffs are highlighted in bold.

=== Record vs. opponents ===
1938–39 NHL Records
Team	BOS	CHI	DET	MTL	NYA	NYR	TOR
Boston	—	8–0	7–1	6–2	5–2–1	5–3	5–2–1
Chicago	0–8	—	1–5–2	4–4	2–4–2	3–4–1	2–3–3
Detroit	1–7	5–1–2	—	4–3–1	3–3–2	2–6	3–4–1
Montreal	2–6	4–4	3–4–1	—	3–2–3	1–4–3	2–4–2
N.Y. Americans	2–5–1	4–2–2	3–3–2	2–3–3	—	2–5–1	4–3–1
N.Y. Rangers	3–5	4–3–1	6–2	4–1–3	5–2–1	—	4–3–1
Toronto	2–5–1	3–2–2	4–3–1	4–2–2	3–4–1	3–4–1	—

== Schedule and results ==
1938–39 regular season
November

Game	Result	Date	Score	Opponent	Record
1	L	November 3, 1938	1–6	@ Chicago Black Hawks (1938–39)	0–1–0
2	W	November 10, 1938	2–1	@ Detroit Red Wings (1938–39)	1–1–0
3	W	November 13, 1938	2–1	Boston Bruins (1938–39)	2–1–0
4	L	November 17, 1938	0–1	Toronto Maple Leafs (1938–39)	2–2–0
5	W	November 19, 1938	2–1 OT	@ Toronto Maple Leafs (1938–39)	3–2–0
6	W	November 22, 1938	7–3	Montreal Canadiens (1938–39)	4–2–0
7	T	November 24, 1938	2–2 OT	@ Montreal Canadiens (1938–39)	4–2–1
8	W	November 26, 1938	6–4	Chicago Black Hawks (1938–39)	5–2–1
9	L	November 27, 1938	2–8	@ Boston Bruins (1938–39)	5–3–1

December

Game	Result	Date	Score	Opponent	Record
10	L	December 4, 1938	1–6	New York Rangers (1938–39)	5–4–1
11	T	December 8, 1938	1–1 OT	@ Detroit Red Wings (1938–39)	5–4–2
12	L	December 11, 1938	0–4	@ Chicago Black Hawks (1938–39)	5–5–2
13	W	December 13, 1938	5–1	Detroit Red Wings (1938–39)	6–5–2
14	T	December 15, 1938	1–1 OT	@ New York Rangers (1938–39)	6–5–3
15	W	December 18, 1938	5–2	Montreal Canadiens (1938–39)	7–5–3
16	L	December 20, 1938	0–3	@ Boston Bruins (1938–39)	7–6–3
17	W	December 25, 1938	5–1	Chicago Black Hawks (1938–39)	8–6–3
18	W	December 29, 1938	4–2	Boston Bruins (1938–39)	9–6–3
19	W	December 31, 1938	3–2	@ Toronto Maple Leafs (1938–39)	10–6–3

January

Game	Result	Date	Score	Opponent	Record
20	W	January 1, 1939	5–1	Toronto Maple Leafs (1938–39)	11–6–3
21	L	January 3, 1939	1–2	@ Boston Bruins (1938–39)	11–7–3
22	T	January 5, 1939	6–6 OT	Detroit Red Wings (1938–39)	11–7–4
23	L	January 8, 1939	2–5	@ New York Rangers (1938–39)	11–8–4
24	W	January 10, 1939	1–0 OT	New York Rangers (1938–39)	12–8–4
25	T	January 14, 1939	1–1 OT	@ Montreal Canadiens (1938–39)	12–8–5
26	T	January 15, 1939	1–1 OT	Montreal Canadiens (1938–39)	12–8–6
27	L	January 21, 1939	2–7	@ Toronto Maple Leafs (1938–39)	12–9–6
28	T	January 22, 1939	1–1 OT	@ Chicago Black Hawks (1938–39)	12–9–7
29	W	January 24, 1939	4–1	Toronto Maple Leafs (1938–39)	13–9–7
30	W	January 26, 1939	1–0	@ New York Rangers (1938–39)	14–9–7
31	L	January 29, 1939	2–3	Boston Bruins (1938–39)	14–10–7
32	T	January 31, 1939	2–2 OT	@ Boston Bruins (1938–39)	14–10–8

February

Game	Result	Date	Score	Opponent	Record
33	L	February 2, 1939	0–7	New York Rangers (1938–39)	14–11–8
34	L	February 5, 1939	3–7	@ Detroit Red Wings (1938–39)	14–12–8
35	T	February 7, 1939	2–2 OT	Chicago Black Hawks (1938–39)	14–12–9
36	L	February 9, 1939	2–5	@ Montreal Canadiens (1938–39)	14–13–9
37	W	February 12, 1939	1–0	Detroit Red Wings (1938–39)	15–13–9
38	L	February 16, 1939	1–2	@ New York Rangers (1938–39)	15–14–9
39	L	February 18, 1939	2–7	@ Montreal Canadiens (1938–39)	15–15–9
40	L	February 19, 1939	4–5	Montreal Canadiens (1938–39)	15–16–9
41	W	February 23, 1939	3–1	Chicago Black Hawks (1938–39)	16–16–9
42	T	February 28, 1939	1–1 OT	Toronto Maple Leafs (1938–39)	16–16–10

March

Game	Result	Date	Score	Opponent	Record
43	L	March 2, 1939	3–7	@ Detroit Red Wings (1938–39)	16–17–10
44	L	March 5, 1939	2–4	Detroit Red Wings (1938–39)	16–18–10
45	L	March 9, 1939	6–9	Boston Bruins (1938–39)	16–19–10
46	W	March 12, 1939	3–2	@ Chicago Black Hawks (1938–39)	17–19–10
47	L	March 14, 1939	3–7	@ Toronto Maple Leafs (1938–39)	17–20–10
48	L	March 16, 1939	5–11	New York Rangers (1938–39)	17–21–10

Legend: Win (2 points) Loss (0 points) Tie (1 point)

== Playoffs ==
They went against Toronto in the first round in a best of three series and got swept in 2 games, or 0–2.

== Player statistics ==
=== Regular season ===
Scoring

Player	GP	G	A	Pts	PIM
Sweeney Schriner	48	13	31	44	20
Tommy Anderson	47	13	27	40	14
Lorne Carr	46	19	18	37	16
Nels Stewart	46	16	19	35	43
Eddie Wiseman	47	12	21	33	8
Art Jackson	48	12	13	25	15
John Sorrell	48	13	9	22	10
Art Chapman	45	3	19	22	2
Hooley Smith	48	8	11	19	18
Joe Jerwa	47	4	12	16	52
Leroy Goldsworthy	48	3	11	14	10
John Gallagher	43	1	5	6	22
Wilf Field	47	1	3	4	37
Roger Jenkins	27	1	1	2	4
Red Beattie	17	0	0	0	5
Alfie Moore	2	0	0	0	0
Allan Murray	18	0	0	0	8
Earl Robertson	46	0	0	0	0

Goaltending

Player	MIN	GP	W	L	T	GA	GAA	SA	SV	SV%	SO
Earl Robertson	2850	46	17	18	10	136	2.86				3
Roger Jenkins	30	1	0	1	0	7	14.00				0
Alfie Moore	120	2	0	2	0	14	7.00				0
Team:	3000	48	17	21	10	157	3.14				3

=== Playoffs ===
Scoring

Player	GP	G	A	Pts	PIM
Tommy Anderson	2	0	0	0	0
Lorne Carr	2	0	0	0	0
Art Chapman	2	0	0	0	0
Wilf Field	2	0	0	0	2
John Gallagher	2	0	0	0	0
Leroy Goldsworthy	2	0	0	0	0
Art Jackson	2	0	0	0	2
Joe Jerwa	2	0	0	0	2
Alfie Moore	2	0	0	0	0
Sweeney Schriner	2	0	0	0	30
Hooley Smith	2	0	0	0	14
John Sorrell	2	0	0	0	0
Nels Stewart	2	0	0	0	0
Jack Tomson	2	0	0	0	0
Eddie Wiseman	2	0	0	0	0

Goaltending

Player	MIN	GP	W	L	T	GA	GAA	SA	SV	SV%	SO
Alfie Moore	120	2	0	2		6	3.00				0
Team:	120	2	0	2		6	3.00				0

== See also ==
- 1938–39 NHL season
