= Rod Lorrain =

Canadian ice hockey player

- Born: July 26, 1914; Buckingham, Quebec, Canada
- Died: October 22, 1980 (aged 66); Buckingham, Quebec, Canada
- Height: 5 ft 5 in (165 cm)
- Weight: 155 lb (70 kg; 11 st 1 lb)
- Position: Right Wing
- Shot: Right
- Played for: Montreal Canadiens
- Playing career: 1936–1945

Joseph Wilfrid Isae Rodrigue Lorrain (July 26, 1914 – October 22, 1980) was a Canadian professional ice hockey player. He played 1794 games in the National Hockey League with the Montreal Canadiens from 1936 to 1941. He was born in Buckingham, Quebec.

== Career statistics ==
=== Regular season and playoffs ===
			Regular season					Playoffs
Season	Team	League	GP	G	A	Pts	PIM	GP	G	A	Pts	PIM
1932–33	Hull Lasalle Juniors	HOHL	11	5	2	7	2	—	—	—	—	—
1933–34	Hull Lasalle Juniors	OCJHL	11	21	14	35	2	4	3	6	9	2
1934–35	Ottawa Senators	OCHL	14	4	6	10	10	8	1	2	3	4
1935–36	Montreal Canadiens	NHL	1	0	0	0	2	—	—	—	—	—
1935–36	Ottawa Senators	OCHL	11	8	4	12	4	—	—	—	—	—
1935–36	Providence Reds	Can-Am	22	2	1	3	4	3	0	0	0	2
1936–37	Montreal Canadiens	NHL	47	3	6	9	8	5	0	0	0	0
1937–38	Montreal Canadiens	NHL	48	13	19	32	14	3	0	0	0	0
1938–39	Montreal Canadiens	NHL	38	10	8	18	0	3	0	3	3	0
1938–39	New Haven Eagles	IAHL	9	1	3	4	0	—	—	—	—	—
1939–40	Montreal Canadiens	NHL	36	1	5	6	6	—	—	—	—	—
1940–41	Saint-Jérôme Papermakers	QPHL	34	34	24	58	12	13	10	6	16	11
1941–42	Montreal Canadiens	NHL	4	1	0	1	0	—	—	—	—	—
1941–42	Washington Lions	AHL	34	4	15	19	0	2	2	0	2	0
1942–43	Washington Lions	AHL	49	8	20	28	8	—	—	—	—	—
1943–44	University of Montreal	MCHL	3	1	2	3	0	—	—	—	—	—
1943–44	Montreal Vickers	MCHL	8	5	3	8	0	—	—	—	—	—
1944–45	Hull Volants	QSHL	11	2	9	11	0	—	—	—	—	—
NHL totals			174	28	38	66	30	11	0	3	3	0
