= 1938–39 Toronto Maple Leafs season =

NHL hockey team season

1938–39 Toronto Maple Leafs
- League: 3rd NHL
- 1938–39 record: 19–20–9
- Home record: 13–8–3
- Road record: 6–12–6
- Goals for: 114
- Goals against: 107

Team information
- General manager: Conn Smythe
- Coach: Dick Irvin
- Captain: Red Horner
- Arena: Maple Leaf Gardens

Team leaders
- Goals: Gordie Drillon (18)
- Assists: Syl Apps (25)
- Points: Syl Apps (40)
- Penalty minutes: Red Horner (85)
- Wins: Turk Broda (19)
- Goals against average: Turk Broda (2.15)

The 1938–39 Toronto Maple Leafs season was Toronto's 22nd season of operation in the National Hockey League (NHL). The Maple Leafs again advanced to the Stanley Cup Finals, losing to the Boston Bruins.

== Regular season ==
=== Final standings ===
National Hockey League
	GP	W	L	T	GF	GA	Pts
**Boston Bruins**	48	36	10	2	156	76	74
**New York Rangers**	48	26	16	6	149	105	58
**Toronto Maple Leafs**	48	19	20	9	114	107	47
**New York Americans**	48	17	21	10	119	157	44
**Detroit Red Wings**	48	18	24	6	107	128	42
**Montreal Canadiens**	48	15	24	9	115	146	39
Chicago Black Hawks	48	12	28	8	91	132	32

Note: GP = Games played, W = Wins, L = Losses, T = Ties, Pts = Points, GF = Goals for, GA = Goals against
Teams that qualified for the playoffs are highlighted in bold.

=== Record vs. opponents ===
1938–39 NHL Records
Team	BOS	CHI	DET	MTL	NYA	NYR	TOR
Boston	—	8–0	7–1	6–2	5–2–1	5–3	5–2–1
Chicago	0–8	—	1–5–2	4–4	2–4–2	3–4–1	2–3–3
Detroit	1–7	5–1–2	—	4–3–1	3–3–2	2–6	3–4–1
Montreal	2–6	4–4	3–4–1	—	3–2–3	1–4–3	2–4–2
N.Y. Americans	2–5–1	4–2–2	3–3–2	2–3–3	—	2–5–1	4–3–1
N.Y. Rangers	3–5	4–3–1	6–2	4–1–3	5–2–1	—	4–3–1
Toronto	2–5–1	3–2–2	4–3–1	4–2–2	3–4–1	3–4–1	—

== Schedule and results ==
1938–39 regular season
November

Game	Result	Date	Score	Opponent	Record
1	L	November 3, 1938	2–3	Boston Bruins (1938–39)	0–1–0
2	L	November 5, 1938	0–2	Chicago Black Hawks (1938–39)	0–2–0
3	W	November 10, 1938	2–0	@ Montreal Canadiens (1938–39)	1–2–0
4	W	November 12, 1938	4–1	Montreal Canadiens (1938–39)	2–2–0
5	T	November 15, 1938	1–1 OT	@ Boston Bruins (1938–39)	2–2–1
6	W	November 17, 1938	1–0	@ New York Americans (1938–39)	3–2–1
7	L	November 19, 1938	1–2 OT	New York Americans (1938–39)	3–3–1
8	T	November 20, 1938	1–1 OT	@ Chicago Black Hawks (1938–39)	3–3–2
9	L	November 24, 1938	2–6	@ New York Rangers (1938–39)	3–4–2
10	W	November 26, 1938	5–0	Detroit Red Wings (1938–39)	4–4–2

December

Game	Result	Date	Score	Opponent	Record
11	L	December 3, 1938	1–3	Montreal Canadiens (1938–39)	4–5–2
12	L	December 4, 1938	0–1	@ Detroit Red Wings (1938–39)	4–6–2
13	W	December 10, 1938	4–1	Chicago Black Hawks (1938–39)	5–6–2
14	T	December 15, 1938	4–4 OT	@ Chicago Black Hawks (1938–39)	5–6–3
15	L	December 17, 1938	2–3	New York Rangers (1938–39)	5–7–3
16	W	December 24, 1938	2–0	Detroit Red Wings (1938–39)	6–7–3
17	W	December 26, 1938	2–0	@ New York Rangers (1938–39)	7–7–3
18	L	December 27, 1938	2–8	@ Boston Bruins (1938–39)	7–8–3
19	L	December 31, 1938	2–3	New York Americans (1938–39)	7–9–3

January

Game	Result	Date	Score	Opponent	Record
20	L	January 1, 1939	1–5	@ New York Americans (1938–39)	7–10–3
21	T	January 3, 1939	2–2 OT	Montreal Canadiens (1938–39)	7–10–4
22	W	January 7, 1939	2–0	Boston Bruins (1938–39)	8–10–4
23	L	January 8, 1939	0–1	@ Chicago Black Hawks (1938–39)	8–11–4
24	W	January 12, 1939	9–4	@ Montreal Canadiens (1938–39)	9–11–4
25	W	January 14, 1939	3–1	Chicago Black Hawks (1938–39)	10–11–4
26	L	January 15, 1939	0–1	@ Detroit Red Wings (1938–39)	10–12–4
27	L	January 17, 1939	1–2	@ Boston Bruins (1938–39)	10–13–4
28	W	January 21, 1939	7–2	New York Americans (1938–39)	11–13–4
29	L	January 24, 1939	1–4	@ New York Americans (1938–39)	11–14–4
30	W	January 28, 1939	6–0	Detroit Red Wings (1938–39)	12–14–4
31	T	January 29, 1939	2–2 OT	@ Detroit Red Wings (1938–39)	12–14–5

February

Game	Result	Date	Score	Opponent	Record
32	L	February 2, 1939	1–2	Boston Bruins (1938–39)	12–15–5
33	L	February 4, 1939	2–4	New York Rangers (1938–39)	12–16–5
34	T	February 5, 1939	5–5 OT	@ New York Rangers (1938–39)	12–16–6
35	L	February 7, 1939	0–2	@ Boston Bruins (1938–39)	12–17–6
36	T	February 11, 1939	3–3 OT	Montreal Canadiens (1938–39)	12–17–7
37	W	February 12, 1939	4–3	@ Montreal Canadiens (1938–39)	13–17–7
38	W	February 18, 1939	2–1	New York Rangers (1938–39)	14–17–7
39	W	February 19, 1939	4–3 OT	@ Chicago Black Hawks (1938–39)	15–17–7
40	W	February 25, 1939	1–0	Boston Bruins (1938–39)	16–17–7
41	L	February 26, 1939	1–5	@ Detroit Red Wings (1938–39)	16–18–7
42	T	February 28, 1939	1–1 OT	@ New York Americans (1938–39)	16–18–8

March

Game	Result	Date	Score	Opponent	Record
43	L	March 2, 1939	1–3	@ Montreal Canadiens (1938–39)	16–19–8
44	T	March 4, 1939	1–1 OT	Chicago Black Hawks (1938–39)	16–19–9
45	W	March 11, 1939	5–1	Detroit Red Wings (1938–39)	17–19–9
46	W	March 14, 1939	7–3	New York Americans (1938–39)	18–19–9
47	W	March 18, 1939	2–1	New York Rangers (1938–39)	19–19–9
48	L	March 19, 1939	2–6	@ New York Rangers (1938–39)	19–20–9

Legend: Win (2 points) Loss (0 points) Tie (1 point)

== Playoffs ==
The Maple Leafs finished in third place in the regular season, which matched them up against the New York Americans in the first round, best of three series. After sweeping the Americans in 2 games, the Leafs played the Detroit Red Wings in the next round in another best of three series, which they won 2–1. In the finals, they played the Boston Bruins, who defeated them 4–1.

== Player statistics ==
=== Regular season ===
Scoring

Player	Pos	GP	G	A	Pts	PIM
Syl Apps	C	44	15	25	40	4
Gordie Drillon	RW	40	18	16	34	15
Busher Jackson	LW	41	10	17	27	12
Murph Chamberlain	LW	48	10	16	26	32
Doc Romnes	LW/C	36	7	16	23	0
Pep Kelly	RW	48	11	11	22	12
Nick Metz	LW	47	11	10	21	15
Gus Marker	RW	29	9	6	15	11
George Parsons	LW	43	7	7	14	14
Bob Davidson	LW	47	4	10	14	29
Red Horner	D	48	4	10	14	85
Bingo Kampman	D	41	2	8	10	52
Jimmy Fowler	D	39	1	6	7	9
Reg Hamilton	D	48	0	7	7	54
Bucko McDonald	D	33	3	3	6	20
Bill Thoms	C	12	1	4	5	4
Jack Church	D	3	0	2	2	2
Pete Langelle	C	2	1	0	1	0
Murray Armstrong	C	3	0	1	1	0
Buzz Boll	LW	11	0	0	0	0
Turk Broda	G	48	0	0	0	0
Red Heron	C	6	0	0	0	0
Norman Mann	RW/C	16	0	0	0	2

Goaltending

Player	MIN	GP	W	L	T	GA	GAA	SO
Turk Broda	2990	48	19	20	9	107	2.15	8
Team:	2990	48	19	20	9	107	2.15	8

=== Playoffs ===
Scoring

Player	Pos	GP	G	A	Pts	PIM
Gordie Drillon	RW	10	7	6	13	4
Syl Apps	C	10	2	6	8	2
Murph Chamberlain	LW	10	2	5	7	4
Nick Metz	LW	10	3	3	6	6
Doc Romnes	LW/C	10	1	4	5	0
Gus Marker	RW	10	2	2	4	0
Red Horner	D	10	1	2	3	26
Pete Langelle	C	11	1	2	3	2
Bob Davidson	LW	10	1	1	2	6
Bingo Kampman	D	10	1	1	2	20
Reg Hamilton	D	10	0	2	2	4
Pep Kelly	RW	9	1	0	1	0
Jimmy Fowler	D	9	0	1	1	2
Busher Jackson	LW	7	0	1	1	2
Turk Broda	G	10	0	0	0	0
Jack Church	D	1	0	0	0	0
Red Heron	C	2	0	0	0	4
Bucko McDonald	D	10	0	0	0	4
Don Metz	RW	2	0	0	0	0

Goaltending

Player	MIN	GP	W	L	GA	GAA	SO
Turk Broda	617	10	5	5	20	1.94	2
Team:	617	10	5	5	20	1.94	2

Note:

Pos = Position;GP = Games played; G = Goals; A = Assists; Pts = Points; PIM = Penalty minutes; +/- = Plus/minus; PPG = Power-play goals; SHG = Short-handed goals; GWG = Game-winning goals
Pos = Position;GP = Games played; Min, TOI = Minutes played; W = Wins; L = Losses; T,T/OT = Ties; OTL = Overtime losses; GA = Goals-against; GAA = Goals-against average; SO = Shutouts; SA = Shots against; SV = Shots saved;SV% = Save percentage;

== Transactions ==
- October 12, 1938: Traded Charlie Conacher to the Detroit Red Wings for $16,000
- November 3, 1938: Acquired Gus Marker from the Montreal Maroons for $4,000
- November 15, 1938: Acquired Norman Mann from the New York Rangers for $4,000
- December 8, 1938: Acquired Doc Romnes from the Chicago Black Hawks for Bill Thoms
- December 19, 1938: Acquired Bucko McDonald from the Detroit Red Wings for Bill Thomson and $10,000

== Farm teams ==
- Syracuse Stars

== See also ==
- 1938–39 NHL season
