= 1938–39 Chicago Black Hawks season =

NHL ice hockey team season

1938–39 Chicago Black Hawks
- League: 7th NHL
- 1938–39 record: 12–28–8
- Home record: 5–13–6
- Road record: 7–15–2
- Goals for: 91
- Goals against: 132

Team information
- General manager: Frederic McLaughlin
- Coach: Bill Stewart (8–10–3); Paul Thompson (4–18–5)
- Captain: Johnny Gottselig
- Arena: Chicago Stadium

Team leaders
- Goals: Johnny Gottselig (16)
- Assists: Johnny Gottselig (23)
- Points: Johnny Gottselig (39)
- Penalty minutes: Earl Seibert (57)
- Wins: Mike Karakas (12)
- Goals against average: Mike Karakas (2.65)

The 1938–39 Chicago Black Hawks season was the team's 13th season in the NHL, and they were coming off a very surprising Stanley Cup victory in 1937–38. The club was hoping to build on that success in a bid for a 2nd straight Stanley Cup.

== Pre-season ==
In July 1938, Chicago GM and vice-president Bill Tobin was named president of the club by Major McLaughlin.

The Montreal Maroons announced they would be folding, leaving the NHL with 7 teams, thus eliminating the need for divisions.

== Regular season ==
The Black Hawks would get off to a mediocre start, and after an 8–10–3 start, they would dismiss head coach Bill Stewart and replace him with player-coach Paul Thompson. The Hawks would struggle under Thompson, going 4–18–5, and finish in last place in the NHL, missing the playoffs for the 2nd time in 3 years. Chicago would continue having problems scoring goals, getting an NHL low 91 goals, while they gave up the 3rd most goals at 132.

Team captain Johnny Gottselig would lead the team offensively, getting team highs in goals (16), assists (23) and points (39). Joffre Desilets and Mush March would be the only other Hawks with double digit goals, with 11 and 10 goals respectively. Earl Seibert would anchor the defense, scoring 15 points and having a team high 57 penalty minutes.

In goal, Mike Karakas would be the starter, winning 12 games, earning 5 shutouts, and posting a GAA of 2.65.

A year after their unexpected Stanley Cup championship, the Black Hawks would become the only team in the league to miss the playoffs, as they finished 7 points behind the 6th place team, the Montreal Canadiens.

=== Final standings ===
National Hockey League
	GP	W	L	T	GF	GA	Pts
**Boston Bruins**	48	36	10	2	156	76	74
**New York Rangers**	48	26	16	6	149	105	58
**Toronto Maple Leafs**	48	19	20	9	114	107	47
**New York Americans**	48	17	21	10	119	157	44
**Detroit Red Wings**	48	18	24	6	107	128	42
**Montreal Canadiens**	48	15	24	9	115	146	39
Chicago Black Hawks	48	12	28	8	91	132	32

Note: GP = Games played, W = Wins, L = Losses, T = Ties, Pts = Points, GF = Goals for, GA = Goals against
Teams that qualified for the playoffs are highlighted in bold.

=== Record vs. opponents ===
1938–39 NHL Records
Team	BOS	CHI	DET	MTL	NYA	NYR	TOR
Boston	—	8–0	7–1	6–2	5–2–1	5–3	5–2–1
Chicago	0–8	—	1–5–2	4–4	2–4–2	3–4–1	2–3–3
Detroit	1–7	5–1–2	—	4–3–1	3–3–2	2–6	3–4–1
Montreal	2–6	4–4	3–4–1	—	3–2–3	1–4–3	2–4–2
N.Y. Americans	2–5–1	4–2–2	3–3–2	2–3–3	—	2–5–1	4–3–1
N.Y. Rangers	3–5	4–3–1	6–2	4–1–3	5–2–1	—	4–3–1
Toronto	2–5–1	3–2–2	4–3–1	4–2–2	3–4–1	3–4–1	—

== Schedule and results ==
1938–39 regular season
November

Game	Date	Visitor	Score	Home	Record	Points
1	November 3	New York Americans	1–6	Chicago Black Hawks	1–0–0	2
2	November 5	Chicago Black Hawks	2–0	Toronto Maple Leafs	2–0–0	4
3	November 6	Chicago Black Hawks	3–2	Montreal Canadiens	3–0–0	6
4	November 13	Montreal Canadiens	3–4	Chicago Black Hawks	4–0–0	8
5	November 17	New York Rangers	1–0	Chicago Black Hawks	4–1–0	8
6	November 20	Toronto Maple Leafs	1–1	Chicago Black Hawks	4–1–1	9
7	November 24	Chicago Black Hawks	2–4	Detroit Red Wings	4–2–1	9
8	November 26	Chicago Black Hawks	4–6	New York Americans	4–3–1	9
9	November 27	Chicago Black Hawks	1–0	New York Rangers	5–3–1	11

December

Game	Date	Visitor	Score	Home	Record	Points
10	December 1	Detroit Red Wings	4–1	Chicago Black Hawks	5–4–1	11
11	December 4	Boston Bruins	5–0	Chicago Black Hawks	5–5–1	11
12	December 6	Chicago Black Hawks	0–2	Boston Bruins	5–6–1	11
13	December 10	Chicago Black Hawks	1–4	Toronto Maple Leafs	5–7–1	11
14	December 11	New York Americans	0–4	Chicago Black Hawks	6–7–1	13
15	December 15	Toronto Maple Leafs	4–4	Chicago Black Hawks	6–7–2	14
16	December 18	New York Rangers	0–5	Chicago Black Hawks	7–7–2	16
17	December 22	Detroit Red Wings	3–3	Chicago Black Hawks	7–7–3	17
18	December 25	Chicago Black Hawks	1–5	New York Americans	7–8–3	17
19	December 27	Chicago Black Hawks	4–1	Montreal Canadiens	8–8–3	19
20	December 29	Chicago Black Hawks	1–4	Detroit Red Wings	8–9–3	19

January

Game	Date	Visitor	Score	Home	Record	Points
21	January 1	Montreal Canadiens	4–3	Chicago Black Hawks	8–10–3	19
22	January 5	Boston Bruins	2–1	Chicago Black Hawks	8–11–3	19
23	January 8	Toronto Maple Leafs	0–1	Chicago Black Hawks	9–11–3	21
24	January 10	Chicago Black Hawks	1–3	Boston Bruins	9–12–3	21
25	January 12	Chicago Black Hawks	0–6	New York Rangers	9–13–3	21
26	January 14	Chicago Black Hawks	1–3	Toronto Maple Leafs	9–14–3	21
27	January 15	New York Rangers	1–1	Chicago Black Hawks	9–14–4	22
28	January 22	New York Americans	1–1	Chicago Black Hawks	9–14–5	23
29	January 26	Detroit Red Wings	1–0	Chicago Black Hawks	9–15–5	23
30	January 29	Montreal Canadiens	1–0	Chicago Black Hawks	9–16–5	23
31	January 31	Chicago Black Hawks	2–3	New York Rangers	9–17–5	23

February

Game	Date	Visitor	Score	Home	Record	Points
32	February 2	Chicago Black Hawks	4–2	Montreal Canadiens	10–17–5	25
33	February 5	Boston Bruins	3–0	Chicago Black Hawks	10–18–5	25
34	February 7	Chicago Black Hawks	2–2	New York Americans	10–18–6	26
35	February 9	Chicago Black Hawks	4–2	Detroit Red Wings	11–18–6	28
36	February 16	Detroit Red Wings	1–1	Chicago Black Hawks	11–18–7	29
37	February 19	Toronto Maple Leafs	4–3	Chicago Black Hawks	11–19–7	29
38	February 21	Chicago Black Hawks	2–8	Boston Bruins	11–20–7	29
39	February 23	Chicago Black Hawks	1–3	New York Americans	11–21–7	29
40	February 26	Boston Bruins	5–1	Chicago Black Hawks	11–22–7	29

March

Game	Date	Visitor	Score	Home	Record	Points
41	March 2	Chicago Black Hawks	3–1	New York Rangers	12–22–7	31
42	March 4	Chicago Black Hawks	1–1	Toronto Maple Leafs	12–22–8	32
43	March 5	Montreal Canadiens	2–1	Chicago Black Hawks	12–23–8	32
44	March 9	New York Rangers	8–3	Chicago Black Hawks	12–24–8	32
45	March 12	New York Americans	3–2	Chicago Black Hawks	12–25–8	32
46	March 14	Chicago Black Hawks	2–4	Boston Bruins	12–26–8	32
47	March 16	Chicago Black Hawks	1–5	Montreal Canadiens	12–27–8	32
48	March 19	Chicago Black Hawks	2–3	Detroit Red Wings	12–28–8	32

Legend: Win (2 points) Loss (0 points) Tie (1 point)

== Player statistics ==
=== Scoring leaders ===
Player	GP	G	A	Pts	PIM
Johnny Gottselig	48	16	23	39	15
Joffre Desilets	48	11	13	24	28
Mush March	47	10	11	21	29
Cully Dahlstrom	48	6	14	20	2
Bill Thoms	36	6	11	17	16

=== Goaltending ===
Player	GP	TOI	W	L	T	GA	SO	GAA
Mike Karakas	48	2988	12	28	8	132	5	2.65

== See also ==
- 1938–39 NHL season
