= Dit Clapper =

Canadian ice hockey player (1907–1978)

- Hockey Hall of Fame, 1947
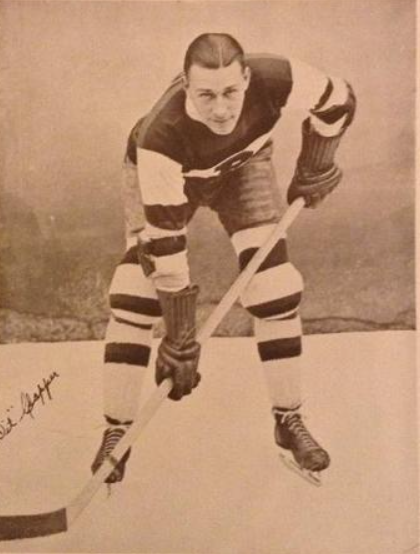
- Clapper with the Boston Bruins in 1933
- Born: February 9, 1907 Newmarket, Ontario, Canada
- Died: January 20, 1978 (aged 70) Peterborough, Ontario, Canada
- Height: 6 ft 2 in (188 cm)
- Weight: 195 lb (88 kg; 13 st 13 lb)
- Position: Right wing/Defence
- Shot: Right
- Played for: Boston Bruins
- Playing career: 1927–1947

Aubrey Victor "Dit" Clapper (February 9, 1907 – January 20, 1978) was a Canadian professional ice hockey player. Clapper played his entire professional career for the Boston Bruins of the National Hockey League (NHL). He was inducted into the Hall of Fame in 1947, the first Honoured Member to be living at the time of his induction.

Clapper was the first NHL player to play 20 seasons, one of only two to be an All-Star at both forward and defence, and the first non-goaltender to play at the age of 40. The right wing on the powerful "Dynamite Line"—one of the first forward combinations to receive a nickname in hockey history—along with linemates Cooney Weiland and Dutch Gainor, he contributed to the breaking of several scoring records in the 1930s. Towards the end of his career, he was named player-coach of the Bruins, and held the coaching position after his retirement as a player.

== Early years ==
Aubrey Clapper was the son of Bill Clapper, a lacrosse player and factory labourer. He was raised in Hastings, Ontario after relocated several years to Aurora, Ontario (1915–1920) and Oshawa, Ontario (1920–1923). Clapper was given his nickname at an early age when he would lisp his name, the result coming out "Dit."

Clapper was related to Ed Broadbent, whose grandmother was cousins with father Bill. Clapper started his hockey career at age 13, playing minor hockey in Oshawa, and going on to play with the junior league Toronto Parkdale club of the Ontario Hockey Association in 1925, scoring a goal in the team's Memorial Cup run that season. The following season he turned professional, playing for the Boston Tigers of the Canadian-American Hockey League.

== NHL career ==
The Boston Bruins bought Clapper's contract from the Tigers in 1927. Hitherto a defenceman, Bruins' coach Art Ross decided to try Clapper at right wing, and the experiment stuck. He scored his first NHL goal—ten seconds into his first shift—in the season opener against the Chicago Black Hawks.

The following season, Ross teamed Clapper up with Cooney Weiland and Dutch Gainor to form the renowned Dynamite Line, one of the first named forward lines in history. The Bruins won the American Division that season and went on to their first Stanley Cup championship, with Clapper scoring the winning goal in the first game of their best-of-three series with the New York Rangers.

In the 1930 season, the league considerably liberalized the passing rules, effectively eliminating offsides. The Stanley Cup champion Bruins took especial advantage, breaking many scoring records and recording the highest winning percentage the league would ever see, unsurpassed as of 2024. Leading the charge was the Dynamite Line, as Weiland led the league in scoring, Clapper finishing third and Gainor finishing ninth; Clapper's goal total of 41 was the third most in league history at that time, he finished the season with a career best 61 points. The Dynamite Line scored 102 of the Bruins' league record 179 goals, as many as last-place Pittsburgh managed. While Clapper scored four goals in six playoff games, the Bruins were shocked in the Stanley Cup finals by the Montreal Canadiens in their best-of-three series.

Clapper married Lorraine Pratt of Vancouver in April 1931.

Clapper in 1949

While Clapper kept his production high in the 1931 season, Gainor's scoring fell off badly, and the Dynamite Line was broken up at season's end. Clapper's 22 goals were good for eighth in the league, and he was named Second team all-star for the first time at right wing at year's end, the first season such All-Stars were named. The following year Clapper—with Bud Cook replacing the traded Gainor on his line with Weiland—was named team captain and again finished eighth in league scoring, but an injury-riddled Bruins' team fell into last place and out of the playoffs. While Weiland was dealt to Ottawa for the 1933 season, the Bruins purchased Montreal Maroons star Nels Stewart and paired him with Clapper to form a powerful offensive unit that led the Bruins back to a division championship.

The largest forward of his era at 6′2″ and 200 lbs, Clapper was a notably peaceful player who nonetheless was involved in an unusual incident in the 1937 Stanley Cup playoffs against the Montreal Maroons. Highsticking Maroon Dave Trottier twice in the head, referee Clarence Campbell (the future NHL president) called Clapper a profane name, and Clapper knocked the referee to the ice with a single punch. Speculation was heavy that Clapper's punishment would be severe, but Campbell himself pleaded Clapper's case, stating that he felt he had provoked the Bruin into the blow; Clapper received only a $100 fine for the incident.

By 1938, Ross believed the Bruins needed an overhaul, and as part of it asked Clapper to move back to defence. Paired with perennial superstar Eddie Shore on the backline, the move proved highly successful, With Clapper in his original position on defense, the reassignment inspired him to play some of the best Hockey of his career. The work of Clapper and Eddie Shore was crucial to Boston's win over the Toronto Maple Leafs in the 1939 Stanley Cup championship. During the 1941 season Clapper demonstrated his well-known sportsmanship when he scored his 200th career goal at Maple Leaf Gardens on January 8, 1941. After the game, he presented the stick he used to reach this milestone to Maple Leafs assistant general manager Frank Selke as a token of his admiration. Later that year, Clapper contributed five playoff assists as the Bruins won their third Stanley Cup by sweeping Detroit in four straight games in the 1941 finals. During this period Clapper was named a First Team NHL All-Star on defence in 1939, 1940 and 1941. This led to Clapper becoming the first and only player in NHL history to be named to an All-Star Team at both forward and defence.

In February 1942, Clapper suffered a severed tendon in a collision with Toronto player Bingo Kampman and was done for the season. It was feared he would be forced into retirement, but he came back next year and returned to form and was named a Second Team NHL All-Star on defence. During the 1944 season, Clapper broke Hooley Smith's career record for games played, holding the record until Maurice Richard surpassed him in 1957.

== Player-coach ==
During the 1944 season, Clapper filled in as interim coach when Art Ross took ill. In 1945 Ross retired as Bruins' coach, retaining his general manager's position, and named Clapper as player-coach, the only one in team history. Now as team captain continuing on defense and being head coach, Claper led the Bruins to the Stanley cup in 1946, although the Bruins lost out to Montreal. Clapper retained his team captaincy until his retirement as a player in 1947, ultimately serving as team captain for longer than any NHL player until Ray Bourque surpassed his total in the 1990s. He went on to coach the Bruins for another 3 seasons losing in the semifinals each year. He finished with an overall record of 102-88-40.

== Retirement and legacy ==
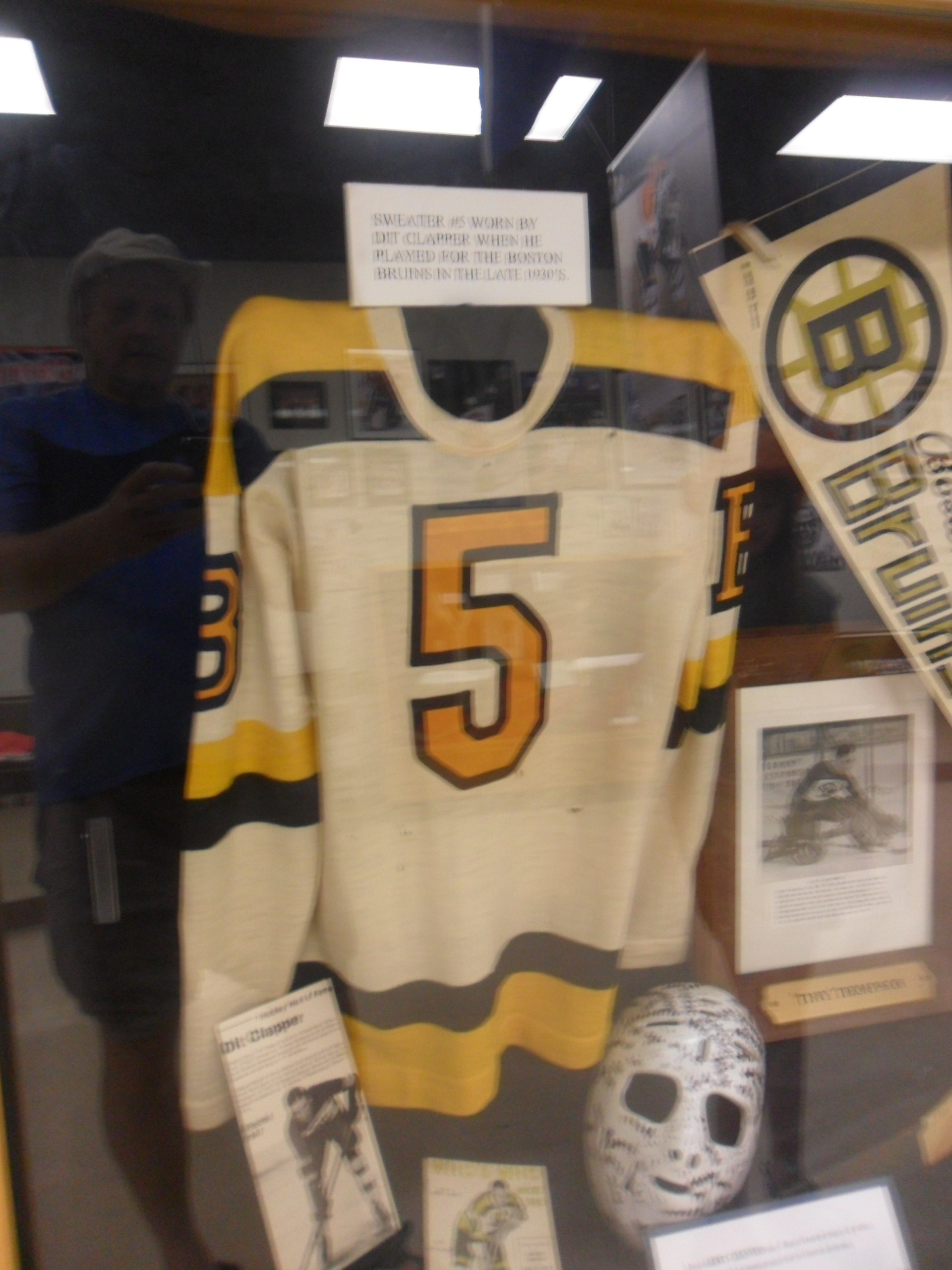
Clapper's #5 jersey on display at the International Hockey Hall of Fame

Hobbled by injuries and with his skills eroded, Clapper originally retired before the start of the 1946–47 season, but returned to play in November 1946 to replace the injured Jack Crawford in the Bruins' lineup. He played only sporadically thereafter, and retired for good on February 12, 1947. Leading the Bruins to a 10–1 victory over the New York Rangers in his final game (in which Bill Cowley broke the league career scoring record), the Bruins further announced that day that his number #5 sweater would be retired, and the Hockey Hall of Fame immediately inducted him as an Honoured Member. Clapper was the only active player ever to be inducted into the Hall, and at the time the only living Member inducted. He was the first player in NHL history to play 20 seasons in the league.

Of his prowess, Bruins goaltending legend Tiny Thompson said:

"Clapper diagnosed the plays like a great infielder in baseball. He put himself where the puck had to come."

Clapper coached the Bruins for two more seasons until, unhappy with the club's performance in the 1949 playoffs against Toronto and uneasy about coaching friends with whom he had played, he resigned. Save for a single season coaching the American Hockey League's Buffalo Bisons in 1960, in which the team recorded a 33-35-4 record and failed to make the playoffs, he did not again participate in professional hockey.

The Canadian Press called Dit Clapper by "the Jean Beliveau of his day". In modern times he would be compared to Wayne Gretzky. Clapper was viewed as a formal man that always dressed with detail. He was liked by fans and media in Boston and everywhere else.

Clapper ran a plumbing firm and a sporting goods store in Peterborough in retirement, while serving as a director of the Peterborough Petes of the OHA. He briefly attempted a political career, standing as a Liberal candidate for the Peterborough West riding in the 1949 federal election, losing by fewer than 250 votes to incumbent Progressive Conservative Gordon Fraser.

Clapper died, of complications from a 1973 stroke, on January 20, 1978. He is buried in Trent Valley Cemetery in Hastings, Ontario.

In 1983, the Bruins signed former Montreal Canadiens star Guy Lapointe, Lapointe sought to wear his customary #5 jersey, which had been retired in Clapper's honour nearly forty years before. Team general manager Harry Sinden agreed to Lapointe's request, but under protests from Clapper's family, Bruins superstar Bobby Orr and the public, Lapointe was switched to #27 after a handful of games.

On August 11, 2012, former Hockey Hall of Fame coach Scotty Bowman, who was a young Peterborough Petes coach when Clapper served on the club's board of directors, paid tribute to Clapper. The occasion was the unveiling by Clapper's daughter, Marilyn Armstrong, of a new street sign named "Dit Clapper Drive" in Hastings, Ontario.

Clapper was honored by the Bruins during their centennial celebrations in 2024, being Named to the Boston Bruins All-Centennial Team.

== Achievements and facts ==
- Stanley Cup winner in 1929, 1939, 1941, the most of any Bruins' player in history.
- NHL second All-Star team: 1931, 1935 as a right wing; 1944 as a defenceman
- NHL first All-Star team: 1939, 1940, 1941 all as a defenceman
- Played in NHL All-Star memorial games (1937, 1939)
- Won the Elizabeth C. Dufresne Trophy as most outstanding Bruins player in home games in 1940 and 1941.
- The first player in NHL history to play for 20 seasons, and one of only nine (Alex Delvecchio, George Armstrong, Henri Richard, Jean Béliveau, Ken Daneyko, Nicklas Lidström, Stan Mikita and Steve Yzerman) to do so with the same team.
- The last active NHL position player that played during the 1920s.
- At the time of his retirement, the NHL career leader in games played and seasons played.
- His #5 jersey number was retired by the Boston Bruins on February 12, 1947.
- Inducted into the Hockey Hall of Fame in 1947.
- Inducted into Canada's Sports Hall of Fame in 1975.
- In 1998, Clapper was ranked number 41 on The Hockey News' list of the 100 Greatest Hockey Players of all time. "Clapper had a simple creed," wrote The Hockey News. "He fought his heart out, bounced players around and took the same kind of punishment he dished out. That's what made him so popular with other players and fans throughout the NHL."
- Mentioned in the hockey cult movie Slap Shot with Toe Blake and Eddie Shore as prime examples of "old time hockey."
- Former NHL defenceman Greg Theberge is Dit's grandson.
- His game jersey from the night of his retirement is on display in the International Hockey Hall of Fame's museum in Kingston, Ontario.
- Named One of the Top 100 Best Bruins Players of all Time.
- Named to the Boston Bruins All-Centennial Team.

== Career statistics ==
=== Regular season and playoffs ===
- **Bold** indicates led league

			Regular season					Playoffs
Season	Team	League	GP	G	A	Pts	PIM	GP	G	A	Pts	PIM
1925–26	Toronto Parkdale	OHA-Jr.	2	0	0	0	0	—	—	—	—	—
1925–26	Toronto Parkdale	M-Cup	—	—	—	—	—	5	1	0	1	—
1926–27	Boston Tigers	Can-Am	29	6	1	7	57	—	—	—	—	—
1927–28	Boston Bruins	NHL	42	4	2	6	18	2	0	0	0	2
1928–29	Boston Bruins	NHL	40	9	2	11	48	5	1	0	1	0
1929–30	Boston Bruins	NHL	44	41	20	61	38	6	**4**	0	4	4
1930–31	Boston Bruins	NHL	43	22	8	30	50	5	2	**4**	6	4
1931–32	Boston Bruins	NHL	48	17	22	39	23	—	—	—	—	—
1932–33	Boston Bruins	NHL	48	14	14	28	42	5	1	1	2	2
1933–34	Boston Bruins	NHL	48	10	12	22	6	—	—	—	—	—
1934–35	Boston Bruins	NHL	48	22	16	38	21	3	1	0	1	0
1935–36	Boston Bruins	NHL	44	12	13	25	14	2	0	1	1	0
1936–37	Boston Bruins	NHL	48	17	8	25	25	3	2	0	2	5
1937–38	Boston Bruins	NHL	46	6	9	15	24	3	0	0	0	12
1938–39	Boston Bruins	NHL	42	13	13	26	22	11	0	1	1	6
1939–40	Boston Bruins	NHL	44	10	18	28	25	6	0	2	2	2
1940–41	Boston Bruins	NHL	48	8	18	26	24	11	0	5	5	4
1941–42	Boston Bruins	NHL	32	3	12	15	31	—	—	—	—	—
1942–43	Boston Bruins	NHL	38	5	18	23	12	9	2	2	4	9
1943–44	Boston Bruins	NHL	50	6	25	31	13	—	—	—	—	—
1944–45	Boston Bruins	NHL	46	8	15	23	16	7	0	0	0	0
1945–46	Boston Bruins	NHL	30	2	3	5	0	4	0	0	0	0
1946–47	Boston Bruins	NHL	6	0	0	0	0	—	—	—	—	—
NHL totals			835	229	248	477	452	82	13	16	29	50

== Coaching record ==
Team	Year	Regular season						Postseason
Team	Year	G	W	L	T	Pts	Division rank	Result
Boston Bruins	1945–46	50	24	18	8	56	2nd in NHL	Lost in Cup Finals
Boston Bruins	1946–47	60	26	23	11	63	2nd in NHL	Lost in semi-finals
Boston Bruins	1947–48	60	23	24	13	59	3rd in NHL	Lost in semi-finals
Boston Bruins	1948–49	60	29	23	8	66	2nd in NHL	Lost in semi-finals
NHL Total		230	102	88	40			

== See also ==
- List of NHL players who spent their entire career with one franchise

Preceded by George Owen	Boston Bruins captain 1932–33	Succeeded by Marty Barry
Preceded by Cooney Weiland	Boston Bruins captain 1939–44	Succeeded by Bill Cowley
Preceded by Art Ross	Head coach of the Boston Bruins; 1945–49	Succeeded by Georges Boucher
