= Harry Frost =

Canadian ice hockey player

- Born: August 17, 1914 Kerr Lake, Ontario, Canada
- Died: March 28, 1973 (aged 58)
- Height: 5 ft 11 in (180 cm)
- Weight: 174 lb (79 kg; 12 st 6 lb)
- Position: Right wing
- Shot: Right
- Played for: Boston Bruins; Chicago Black Hawks; Detroit Red Wings
- Playing career: 1935–1952

Henry Frost (August 17, 1914 — March 28, 1973) was a Canadian professional ice hockey forward who played two regular games and one playoff game in the National Hockey League for the Boston Bruins during the 1938–39 season. Boston won the Stanley Cup that year, and added Frost's name on the Cup. The rest of Frost's career, which lasted from 1935 to 1952, was spent in different minor leagues. He was born in Kerr Lake, Ontario, but grew up in New Liskeard, Ontario.

== Career statistics ==
=== Regular season and playoffs ===
			Regular season					Playoffs
Season	Team	League	GP	G	A	Pts	PIM	GP	G	A	Pts	PIM
1934–35	Sudbury Frood Tigers	NOHA	8	9	1	10	6	3	0	0	0	4
1935–36	Hershey B'ars	EAHL	38	7	2	9	8	5	1	2	3	0
1936–37	Hershey B'ars	EAHL	47	7	7	14	11	4	1	1	2	2
1937–38	Hershey B'ars	EAHL	57	37	25	62	6	—	—	—	—	—
1938–39	Boston Bruins	NHL	2	0	0	0	0	1	0	0	0	0
1938–39	Hershey Bears	IAHL	35	10	7	17	8	4	0	2	2	4
1939–40	Hershey Bears	IAHL	52	12	18	30	6	6	1	2	3	0
1940–41	Hershey Bears	AHL	55	25	15	40	2	10	4	3	7	0
1941–42	Hershey Bears	AHL	52	18	22	40	6	5	1	1	2	2
1941–42	Philadelphia Rockets	AHL	3	1	3	4	0	—	—	—	—	—
1942–43	Hershey Bears	AHL	56	43	40	83	6	6	2	0	2	0
1945–46	Hershey Bears	AHL	39	9	6	15	8	3	0	1	1	4
1946–47	Springfield Indians	AHL	62	28	21	49	10	2	1	0	1	0
1947–48	Springfield Indians	AHL	67	21	23	44	19	—	—	—	—	—
1948–49	Fort Worth Rangers	USHL	6	2	3	5	2	—	—	—	—	—
1948–49	Springfield Indians	AHL	1	0	0	0	0	—	—	—	—	—
1948–49	Washington Lions	AHL	54	25	14	39	2	—	—	—	—	—
1949–50	Louisville Blades	USHL	16	4	5	9	4	—	—	—	—	—
1949–50	Fresno Falcons	PCHL	42	9	7	16	2	—	—	—	—	—
1949–50	St. Louis Flyers	AHL	9	1	0	1	0	—	—	—	—	—
1950–51	Johnstown Jets	EAHL	54	16	38	54	10	6	0	1	1	0
1951–52	Washington Lions	EAHL	34	16	19	35	8	—	—	—	—	—
IAHL/AHL totals			485	193	169	362	67	36	9	9	18	10
NHL totals			2	0	0	0	0	1	0	0	0	0
