= Paul Raymond (ice hockey) =

Canadian ice hockey player

- Born: February 27, 1913; Montreal, Quebec, Canada
- Died: April 4, 1995 (aged 82)
- Height: 5 ft 8 in (173 cm)
- Weight: 150 lb (68 kg; 10 st 10 lb)
- Position: Right wing
- Shot: Right
- Played for: Montreal Canadiens
- Playing career: 1931–1947

Paul Marcel Raymond (February 27, 1913 – April 4, 1995) was a Canadian professional ice hockey forward. He played 65 games in the National Hockey League for the Montreal Canadiens from 1932 to 1935. The rest of his career, which lasted from 1931 to 1947, was spent in the minor leagues. He was born in Montreal, Quebec.

== Career statistics ==
=== Regular season and playoffs ===
			Regular season					Playoffs
Season	Team	League	GP	G	A	Pts	PIM	GP	G	A	Pts	PIM
1930–31	Montreal Junior Canadiens	QJAHA	4	2	1	3	2	—	—	—	—	—
1931–32	Montreal Senior Canadiens	MCHL	11	5	4	9	8	2	2	0	2	0
1931–32	Montreal CPR	MRTAHL	9	7	4	11	8	3	1	2	3	0
1932–33	Montreal Canadiens	NHL	16	0	0	0	0	—	—	—	—	—
1932–33	Providence Reds	Can-Am	20	1	5	6	0	2	0	0	0	0
1933–34	Montreal Canadiens	NHL	29	1	0	1	2	2	0	0	0	0
1933–34	Windsor Bulldogs	IHL	20	1	1	2	6	—	—	—	—	—
1934–35	Montreal Canadiens	NHL	20	1	1	2	0	—	—	—	—	—
1934–35	Quebec Castors	Can-Am	30	9	12	21	24	3	0	0	0	4
1935–36	Springfield Indians	Can-Am	48	6	27	33	55	3	2	1	3	0
1936–37	Springfield Indians	IAHL	43	11	17	28	49	5	0	2	2	0
1937–38	Springfield Indians	IAHL	14	0	4	4	0	—	—	—	—	—
1937–38	New Haven Eagles	IAHL	33	10	14	24	14	2	0	0	0	0
1938–39	New Haven Eagles	IAHL	51	2	5	7	22	—	—	—	—	—
1939–40	Montreal Royals	QSHL	26	6	27	33	12	6	3	5	8	0
1939–40	Montreal Royals	Al-Cup	—	—	—	—	—	5	2	7	9	0
1940–41	Montreal Royals	QSHL	33	13	19	32	31	4	0	0	0	0
1940–41	Montreal Royals	Al-Cup	—	—	—	—	—	10	1	4	5	6
1941–42	Montreal Royals	QSHL	38	17	18	35	24	—	—	—	—	—
1942–43	Montreal Royals	QSHL	5	0	0	0	8	—	—	—	—	—
1945–46	Montreal Royals	QSHL	26	8	14	22	6	9	2	6	8	6
1946–47	Montreal Royals	QSHL	2	0	1	1	0	—	—	—	—	—
1946–47	Lachine Rapides	QPHL	26	9	15	24	13	9	1	1	2	2
IAHL totals			141	23	40	63	85	7	0	2	2	0
QSHL totals			130	44	79	123	81	19	5	11	16	6
NHL totals			65	2	1	3	2	2	0	0	0	0
