= Jack Portland =

Canadian ice hockey player

- Born: July 30, 1912 Collingwood, Ontario, Canada
- Died: August 15, 1996 (aged 84) Brockville, Ontario, Canada
- Height: 6 ft 2 in (188 cm)
- Weight: 198 lb (90 kg; 14 st 2 lb)
- Position: Defence
- Shot: Left
- Played for: Montreal Canadiens; Boston Bruins; Chicago Black Hawks
- Playing career: 1933–1943

John Frederick Portland (July 30, 1912 – August 15, 1996) was a Canadian ice hockey defenceman and athlete. He played in the National Hockey League for the Montreal Canadiens, Boston Bruins, and Chicago Black Hawks from 1933 to 1943. He also participated in the high jump and triple jump events at the 1932 Summer Olympics in Los Angeles. Portland was born in Collingwood, Ontario.

== Career statistics ==
=== Regular season and playoffs ===
			Regular season					Playoffs
Season	Team	League	GP	G	A	Pts	PIM	GP	G	A	Pts	PIM
1932–33	Collingwood Combines	OHA Sr	—	—	—	—	—	—	—	—	—	—
1933–34	Montreal Canadiens	NHL	31	0	2	2	10	2	0	0	0	0
1934–35	Montreal Canadiens	NHL	6	0	0	0	2	—	—	—	—	—
1934–35	Boston Bruins	NHL	14	1	0	1	2	—	—	—	—	—
1934–35	Boston Tigers	Can-Am	28	7	5	12	34	3	0	0	0	4
1935–36	Boston Bruins	NHL	2	0	0	0	0	—	—	—	—	—
1935–36	Boston Cubs	Can-Am	47	4	6	10	95	—	—	—	—	—
1936–37	Boston Bruins	NHL	46	2	4	6	58	3	0	0	0	4
1937–38	Boston Bruins	NHL	48	0	6	6	26	3	0	0	0	4
1938–39	Boston Bruins	NHL	48	4	5	9	46	12	0	0	0	11
1939–40	Boston Bruins	NHL	30	0	5	5	16	—	—	—	—	—
1939–40	Chicago Black Hawks	NHL	21	1	4	5	22	2	0	0	0	2
1940–41	Chicago Black Hawks	NHL	5	0	0	0	4	—	—	—	—	—
1940–41	Montreal Canadiens	NHL	42	2	7	9	34	3	0	1	1	2
1941–42	Montreal Canadiens	NHL	46	2	9	11	53	3	0	0	0	0
1942–43	Montreal Canadiens	NHL	49	3	14	17	52	5	1	2	3	2
1946–47	Buffalo Bisons	AHL	50	2	14	16	25	2	0	0	0	0
1947–48	Philadelphia Rockets	AHL	1	0	1	1	0	—	—	—	—	—
1947–48	Washington Lions	AHL	56	5	14	19	19	—	—	—	—	—
NHL totals			388	15	56	71	325	33	1	3	4	25

== Awards and achievements ==
- Can-Am First All-Star Team (1936)
