= 1938–39 NHL season =

Professional ice hockey league season

- League: National Hockey League
- Sport: Ice hockey
- Duration: November 3, 1938 – April 16, 1939
- Games: 48
- Teams: 7

Regular season
- Season champions: Boston Bruins
- Season MVP: Toe Blake (Canadiens)
- Top scorer: Toe Blake (Canadiens)

Stanley Cup
- Champions: Boston Bruins
- Runners-up: Toronto Maple Leafs

NHL seasons
- 1937–38 1939–40

The 1938–39 NHL season was the 22nd season of the National Hockey League (NHL). The Montreal Maroons suspended operations prior to the season. With seven teams left played 48 games each, the league reverted to a one division format. The Boston Bruins were the Stanley Cup winners as they beat the Toronto Maple Leafs four games to one in the final series.

== League business ==
Just prior to the start of the 1938–39 season, the league held a meeting to decide the fate of the Montreal Maroons. The team had requested a shift to St. Louis, but this was rejected after considerable discussion, resulting in the Maroons suspending operations for the season. They sold most of their players to the Canadiens, and it was evident that the Maroons were through for good. This was the last time a team that had previously won a Stanley Cup either folded or relocated to another market. With only seven teams left, the NHL decided to go back to the one division format.

The Stanley Cup Final was expanded to a best-of-seven format.

NHL president Frank Calder reached a new professional-amateur agreement with Canadian Amateur Hockey Association (CAHA) and its president W. G. Hardy in August 1938. The CAHA agreed not to allow international transfers for players on NHL reserve lists, and the NHL agreed not to sign any junior players without permission. It limited the number of amateur players which could be signed to contracts, and stipulated that both organizations use the same playing rules and recognize each other's suspensions.

== Regular season ==
Prior to the start of the season, the Boston Bruins sold their star goaltender, Tiny Thompson, who had just won a record fourth Vezina Trophy, to the Detroit Red Wings. The fans thought Art Ross was crazy, but soon they were applauding rookie Frank Brimsek, who would go on to back-stop the Bruins to a first overall finish and a Stanley Cup victory. He wiped out Thompson's shutout sequence record with three consecutive shutouts. He nearly equalled his new record with three more. He ended the season with 10 shutouts, and earned the nickname "Mr. Zero". He also became the first goaltender to win both the Vezina Trophy and Calder Memorial Trophy in the same season.

Joseph Cattarinich died on December 7 of a heart attack following an eye operation. Cattarinich was the original goaltender of the Montreal Canadiens when they were formed in 1909 and later a part-owner of the team. He was 57.

The Montreal Canadiens eroded to the point where Jules Dugal replaced Cecil Hart as manager and coach. Dugal was not much better and the Canadiens finished sixth. One bright note was that Toe Blake won the scoring title, however, despite the poor showing of the team.

Chicago, after its Stanley Cup win the previous season, began floundering at mid-season and owner Frederic McLaughlin was displeased. Accordingly, he fired coach Bill Stewart and hired left wing Paul Thompson in his place. But the Black Hawks continued to lose and finished last.

The New York Americans, up in third place at mid-season, proceeded to fall into a big slump in the second half and though they finished fourth, they were below .500 and had the worst defence in the league. Part of the problem was the retirements of Ching Johnson and Hap Day on defence. Al Murray was also out of action for quite a time. Still, goaltender Earl Robertson found himself on the second all-star team.

=== Final standings ===
National Hockey League
| | GP | W | L | T | GF | GA | Pts |
|---|---|---|---|---|---|---|---|
| **Boston Bruins** | 48 | 36 | 10 | 2 | 156 | 76 | 74 |
| **New York Rangers** | 48 | 26 | 16 | 6 | 149 | 105 | 58 |
| **Toronto Maple Leafs** | 48 | 19 | 20 | 9 | 114 | 107 | 47 |
| **New York Americans** | 48 | 17 | 21 | 10 | 119 | 157 | 44 |
| **Detroit Red Wings** | 48 | 18 | 24 | 6 | 107 | 128 | 42 |
| **Montreal Canadiens** | 48 | 15 | 24 | 9 | 115 | 146 | 39 |
| Chicago Black Hawks | 48 | 12 | 28 | 8 | 91 | 132 | 32 |

Note: GP = Games played, W = Wins, L = Losses, T = Ties, Pts = Points, GF = Goals for, GA = Goals against
Teams that qualified for the playoffs are highlighted in bold.

== Playoffs ==
=== Playoff bracket ===
With the league reduced to seven teams, a new playoff format was adopted, still using a structure similar to a double-elimination tournament with a "winners' bracket", and a "losers' or repechage bracket". The top six teams in the league qualified for the playoffs. The top two teams played in a best-of-seven Stanley Cup semifinal series. The third-place team then met the fourth-place team in one best-of-five series, and the fifth-place team faced the sixth-place team in another best-of-five series, to determine the participants for the other best-of-five semifinal series. The semifinal winners then met in a best-of-seven Stanley Cup Final (scores in the bracket indicate the number of games won in each series).

Quarterfinals
3 | Toronto | 2
4 | NY Americans | 0
5 | Detroit | 2
6 | Montreal | 1

Semifinals
1 | Boston | 4
2 | NY Rangers | 3
3 | Toronto | 2
5 | Detroit | 1

Stanley Cup Finals
1 | Boston | 4
3 | Toronto | 1

=== Quarterfinals ===
==== (3) Toronto Maple Leafs vs. (4) New York Americans ====
| March 21 | New York Americans | 0–4 | Toronto Maple Leafs | Maple Leaf Gardens | Recap |
| No scoring | | First period | 04:09 – Pep Kelly (1) |
| No scoring | | Second period | 10:46 – pp – Pete Langelle (1); 14:48 – Syl Apps (1) |
| No scoring | | Third period | 02:31 – Gordie Drillon (1) |
| Alfie Moore | | Goalie stats | Turk Broda |

| March 23 | Toronto Maple Leafs | 2–0 | New York Americans | Madison Square Garden III | Recap |
| No scoring | | First period | No scoring |
| No scoring | | Second period | No scoring |
| Gordie Drillon (2) – 03:18; Gus Marker (1) – 18:12 | | Third period | No scoring |
| Turk Broda | | Goalie stats | Alfie Moore |

| Toronto won series 2–0 |

==== (5) Detroit Red Wings vs. (6) Montreal Canadiens ====
| March 21 | Detroit Red Wings | 0–2 | Montreal Canadiens | Montreal Forum | Recap |
| No scoring | | First period | No scoring |
| Toe Blake (1) – pp – 13:31; Lou Trudel (1) – 17:25 | | Second period | No scoring |
| No scoring | | Third period | No scoring |
| Tiny Thompson | | Goalie stats | Claude Bourque |

| March 23 | Montreal Canadiens | 3–7 | Detroit Red Wings | Olympia Stadium | Recap |
| Walt Buswell (1) – 18:43 | | First period | 06:49 – Ken Kilrea (1) |
| Walt Buswell (2) – pp – 07:53; Armand Mondou (1) – pp – 14:22 | | Second period | 00:32 – pp – Marty Barry (1); 01:02 – pp – Syd Howe (1) |
| No scoring | | Third period | 13:44 – pp – Syd Howe (2); 14:39 – pp – Syd Howe (3); 17:02 – Sid Abel (1); 18:30 – Eddie Wares (1) |
| Claude Bourque | | Goalie stats | Tiny Thompson |

| March 26 | Montreal Canadiens | 0–1 | OT | Detroit Red Wings | Olympia Stadium | Recap |
| No scoring | | First period | | No scoring |
| No scoring | | Second period | | No scoring |
| No scoring | | Third period | | No scoring |
| No scoring | | First overtime period | | 07:47 – pp – Marty Barry (2) |
| Claude Bourque | | Goalie stats | | Tiny Thompson |

| Detroit won series 2–1 |

=== Semifinals ===
==== (1) Boston Bruins vs. (2) New York Rangers ====
This series was the first to need seven games in NHL history; additionally, the Rangers were the first team in NHL history to force a Game seven after losing the first three games of a series. Mel Hill, a right winger for the Bruins, scored a record three overtime goals in a single series.

| March 21 | Boston Bruins | 2–1 | 3OT | New York Rangers | Madison Square Garden III | Recap |
| No scoring | | First period | | No scoring |
| No scoring | | Second period | | 18:18 – pp – Alex Shibicky (1) |
| Bill Cowley (1) – pp – 04:50 | | Third period | | No scoring |
| Mel Hill (1) – 19:25 | | Third overtime period | | No scoring |
| Frank Brimsek | | Goalie stats | | Dave Kerr |

| March 23 | New York Rangers | 2–3 | OT | Boston Bruins | Boston Garden | Recap |
| No scoring | | First period | | 18:15 – Roy Conacher (1); 19:13 – Bill Cowley (2) |
| Alex Shibicky (2) – 14:20 | | Second period | | No scoring |
| Dutch Hiller (1) – 17:46 | | Third period | | No scoring |
| No scoring | | First overtime period | | 08:24 – Mel Hill (2) |
| Bert Gardner | | Goalie stats | | Frank Brimsek |

| March 26 | New York Rangers | 1–4 | Boston Bruins | Boston Garden | Recap |
| No scoring | | First period | 07:38 – Gord Pettinger (1) |
| Babe Pratt (1) – 13:06 | | Second period | 00:25 – Milt Schmidt (1) |
| No scoring | | Third period | 10:00 – Milt Schmidt (2); 12:06 – Bill Cowley (3) |
| Bert Gardiner | | Goalie stats | Frank Brimsek |

| March 28 | Boston Bruins | 1–2 | New York Rangers | Madison Square Garden III | Recap |
| Milt Schmidt (3) – 00:49 | | First period | 08:58 – Mac Colville (1) |
| No scoring | | Second period | 10:02 – sh – Lynn Patrick (1) |
| No scoring | | Third period | No scoring |
| Frank Brimsek | | Goalie stats | Bert Gardiner |

| March 30 | New York Rangers | 2–1 | OT | Boston Bruins | Boston Garden | Recap |
| Art Coulter (1) – 06:20 | | First period | | 07:39 – Bobby Bauer (1) |
| No scoring | | Second period | | No scoring |
| No scoring | | Third period | | No scoring |
| Clint Smith (1) – 17:19 | | First overtime period | | No scoring |
| Bert Gardiner | | Goalie stats | | Frank Brimsek |

| April 1 | Boston Bruins | 1–3 | New York Rangers | Madison Square Garden III | Recap |
| No scoring | | First period | No scoring |
| Mel Hill (3) – 11:40 | | Second period | 14:08 – Phil Watson (1) |
| No scoring | | Third period | 05:58 – pp – Bill Carse (1); 09:25 – pp – Alex Shibicky (3) |
| Frank Brimsek | | Goalie stats | Bert Gardiner |

| April 2 | New York Rangers | 1–2 | 3OT | Boston Bruins | Boston Garden | Recap |
| No scoring | | First period | | No scoring |
| Muzz Patrick (1) – 17:45 | | Second period | | 15:52 – Ray Getliffe (1) |
| No scoring | | Third period | | No scoring |
| No scoring | | Third overtime period | | 08:00 – Mel Hill (4) |
| Bert Gardiner | | Goalie stats | | Frank Brimsek |

| Boston won series 4–3 |

==== (3) Toronto Maple Leafs vs. (5) Detroit Red Wings ====
| March 28 | Detroit Red Wings | 1–4 | Toronto Maple Leafs | Maple Leaf Gardens | Recap |
| No scoring | | First period | 05:03 – Nick Metz (1); 09:36 – pp – Gordie Drillon (3) |
| Marty Barry (3) – pp – 10:35 | | Second period | 02:55 – pp – Nick Metz (2); 04:10 – pp – Gordie Drillon (4) |
| No scoring | | Third period | No scoring |
| Tiny Thompson | | Goalie stats | Turk Broda |

| March 30 | Toronto Maple Leafs | 1–3 | Detroit Red Wings | Olympia Stadium | Recap |
| Gordie Drillon (5) – pp – 09:00 | | First period | 06:30 – pp – Charlie Conacher (1); 15:00 – Don Deacon (1); 18:00 – Herbie Lewis (1) |
| No scoring | | Second period | No scoring |
| No scoring | | Third period | No scoring |
| Turk Broda | | Goalie stats | Tiny Thompson |

| April 1 | Detroit Red Wings | 4–5 | OT | Toronto Maple Leafs | Maple Leaf Gardens | Recap |
| Don Grosso (1) – 15:14 | | First period | | 05:05 – pp – Nick Metz (3); 16:48 – Gordie Drillon (6) |
| Don Deacon (2) – pp – 15:51 | | Second period | | No scoring |
| Charlie Conacher (2) – 04:46; Hec Kilrea (1) – 11:07 | | Third period | | 08:20 – Bob Davidson (1); 09:23 – Murph Chamberlain (1) |
| No scoring | | First overtime period | | 05:42 – Gordie Drillon (7) |
| Tiny Thompson | | Goalie stats | | Turk Broda |

| Toronto won series 2–1 |

=== Stanley Cup Finals ===
| April 6 | Toronto Maple Leafs | 1–2 | Boston Bruins | Boston Garden | Recap |
| No scoring | | First period | 16:04 – Woody Dumart (1) |
| No scoring | | Second period | No scoring |
| Red Horner (1) – 13:54 | | Third period | 16:31 – Bobby Bauer (2) |
| Turk Broda | | Goalie stats | Frank Brimsek |

| April 9 | Toronto Maple Leafs | 3–2 | OT | Boston Bruins | Boston Garden | Recap |
| Murph Chamberlain (2) – 08:55; Syl Apps (2) – 09:29 | | First period | | No scoring |
| No scoring | | Second period | | 15:05 – Roy Conacher (2); 16:18 – Mel Hill (5) |
| No scoring | | Third period | | No scoring |
| Doc Romnes (1) | | First overtime period | | No scoring |
| Turk Broda | | Goalie stats | | Frank Brimsek |

| April 11 | Boston Bruins | 3–1 | Toronto Maple Leafs | Maple Leaf Gardens | Recap |
| No scoring | | First period | No scoring |
| No scoring | | Second period | No scoring |
| Bobby Bauer (3) – 01:28; Roy Conacher (3) – 08:12; Jack Crawford (1) – 13:03 | | Third period | 19:11 – Gus Marker (2) |
| Frank Brimsek | | Goalie stats | Turk Broda |

| April 13 | Boston Bruins | 2–0 | Toronto Maple Leafs | Maple Leaf Gardens | Recap |
| Roy Conacher (4) – pp – 02:20 | | First period | No scoring |
| No scoring | | Second period | No scoring |
| Roy Conacher (5) – 12:55 | | Third period | No scoring |
| Frank Brimsek | | Goalie stats | Turk Broda |

| April 16 | Toronto Maple Leafs | 1–3 | Boston Bruins | Boston Garden | Recap |
| Bingo Kampman (1) – 18:40 | | First period | 11:40 – Mel Hill (6) |
| No scoring | | Second period | 17:54 – Roy Conacher (6) |
| No scoring | | Third period | 19:23 – Flash Hollett (1) |
| Turk Broda | | Goalie stats | Frank Brimsek |

| Boston won series 4–1 |

== Awards ==
Award winners
| Calder Trophy: (Best first-year player) | Frank Brimsek, Boston Bruins |
| Hart Trophy: (Most valuable player) | Toe Blake, Montreal Canadiens |
| Lady Byng Memorial Trophy: (Excellence and sportsmanship) | Clint Smith, New York Rangers |
| O'Brien Cup: (Stanley Cup runner-up) | Toronto Maple Leafs |
| Prince of Wales Trophy: (regular-season champion) | Boston Bruins |
| Vezina Trophy: (fewest goals allowed) | Frank Brimsek, Boston Bruins |

All-Star teams
| First team | Position | Second team |
|---|---|---|
| Frank Brimsek, Boston Bruins | G | Earl Robertson, New York Americans |
| Eddie Shore, Boston Bruins | D | Earl Seibert, Chicago Black Hawks |
| Dit Clapper, Boston Bruins | D | Art Coulter, New York Rangers |
| Syl Apps, Toronto Maple Leafs | C | Neil Colville, New York Rangers |
| Gordie Drillon, Toronto Maple Leafs | RW | Bobby Bauer, Boston Bruins |
| Toe Blake, Montreal Canadiens | LW | Johnny Gottselig, Chicago Black Hawks |
| Art Ross, Boston Bruins | Coach | Red Dutton, New York Americans |

== Player statistics ==
=== Scoring leaders ===
| Player | Team | GP | G | A | PTS | PIM |
|---|---|---|---|---|---|---|
| Toe Blake | Montreal Canadiens | 48 | 24 | 23 | 47 | 10 |
| Sweeney Schriner | New York Americans | 48 | 13 | 31 | 44 | 20 |
| Bill Cowley | Boston Bruins | 34 | 8 | 34 | 42 | 2 |
| Clint Smith | New York Rangers | 48 | 21 | 20 | 41 | 2 |
| Marty Barry | Detroit Red Wings | 48 | 13 | 28 | 41 | 4 |
| Syl Apps | Toronto Maple Leafs | 44 | 15 | 25 | 40 | 4 |
| Tommy Anderson | New York Americans | 48 | 13 | 27 | 40 | 14 |
| Johnny Gottselig | Chicago Black Hawks | 48 | 16 | 23 | 39 | 15 |
| Paul Haynes | Montreal Canadiens | 47 | 5 | 33 | 38 | 27 |
| Roy Conacher | Boston Bruins | 47 | 26 | 11 | 37 | 12 |

Note: GP = Games played, G = Goals, A = Assists, PTS = Points, PIM = Penalties in minutes

== Coaches ==
- Boston Bruins: Art Ross
- Chicago Black Hawks: Bill Stewart and Paul Thompson
- Detroit Red Wings: Jack Adams
- Montreal Canadiens: Cecil Hart
- New York Americans: Red Dutton
- New York Rangers: Lester Patrick
- Toronto Maple Leafs: Dick Irvin

== Debuts ==
The following is a list of players of note who played their first NHL game in 1938–39 (listed with their first team, asterisk(*) marks debut in playoffs):

- Roy Conacher, Boston Bruins
- Frank Brimsek, Boston Bruins
- Ab DeMarco, Chicago Black Hawks
- Don Grosso, Detroit Red Wings
- Sid Abel, Detroit Red Wings
- Jack Stewart, Detroit Red Wings

== Last games ==
The following is a list of players of note that played their last game in the NHL in 1938–39 (listed with their last team):

- Russ Blinco, Chicago Black Hawks
- Paul Thompson, Chicago Black Hawks
- Baldy Northcott, Chicago Black Hawks
- Alex Levinsky, Chicago Black Hawks
- Bob Gracie, Chicago Black Hawks
- Larry Aurie, Detroit Red Wings
- Herbie Lewis, Detroit Red Wings
- Dave Trottier, Detroit Red Wings
- Babe Siebert, Montreal Canadiens
- Jimmy Ward, Montreal Canadiens

== See also ==
- 1938–39 NHL transactions
- List of Stanley Cup champions
- 1938 in sports
- 1939 in sports
