= 1939–40 Montreal Canadiens season =

NHL hockey team season

1939–40 Montreal Canadiens
- League: 7th NHL
- 1939–40 record: 10–33–5
- Home record: 5–14–5
- Road record: 5–19–0
- Goals for: 90
- Goals against: 168

Team information
- General manager: Jules Dugal
- Coach: Pit Lepine
- Captain: Walter Buswell
- Arena: Montreal Forum

Team leaders
- Goals: Toe Blake (17)
- Assists: Toe Blake (21)
- Points: Toe Blake (38)
- Penalty minutes: Polly Drouin (51)
- Wins: Claude Bourque (9)
- Goals against average: Claude Bourque (3.26)

The 1939–40 Montreal Canadiens season was the 31st season in franchise history. The team placed seventh in the regular season and did not qualify for the playoffs for the first time since the 1935–36 season. The Canadiens would not finish a season in last place in their division again until the 1998–99 Montreal Canadiens season, and would not finish last in the league for 2021–22 Montreal Canadiens season.

== Regular season ==
The Canadiens' first game saw them score what would be a season-high 8 goals as they defeated the Chicago Black Hawks 8–2 at the Montreal Forum on November 5, 1939. The Habs were undefeated over their first six games (4–0–2) and were 6-2-2 in their first ten. After that, however, long winless streaks were the rule. They went 3-8-0 in December, 1-10-1 in January, 1-8-1 in February and 1-5-1 in March. Their most lopsided loss happened on February 22, 1940 – 1–10 against the Chicago Black Hawks at Chicago.

=== Final standings ===
National Hockey League
	GP	W	L	T	GF	GA	PIM	Pts
**Boston Bruins**	48	31	12	5	170	98	330	67
**New York Rangers**	48	27	11	10	136	77	520	64
**Toronto Maple Leafs**	48	25	17	6	134	110	485	56
**Chicago Black Hawks**	48	23	19	6	112	120	351	52
**Detroit Red Wings**	48	16	26	6	91	126	250	38
**New York Americans**	48	15	29	4	106	140	236	34
Montreal Canadiens	48	10	33	5	90	167	338	25

Note: GP = Games Played, W = Wins, L = Losses, T = Ties, GF = Goals For, GA = Goals Against, PIM = Penalty Minutes, Pts = Points
Teams that qualified for the playoffs are highlighted in bold.

=== Record vs. opponents ===
1939–40 NHL Records
Team	BOS	CHI	DET	MTL	NYA	NYR	TOR
Boston	—	6–1–1	5–3	6–1–1	7–1	2–4–2	5–2–1
Chicago	1–6–1	—	6–0–2	5–2–1	3–4–1	4–4	4–3–1
Detroit	3–5	0–6–2	—	5–3	5–3	2–3–2	1–6–1
Montreal	1–6–1	2–5–1	3–5	—	2–4–2	1–6–1	1–7
N.Y. Americans	1–7	4–3–1	3–5	4–2–2	—	1–6–1	2–6
N.Y. Rangers	4–2–2	4–4	3–2–2	6–1–1	6–1–1	—	4–1–3
Toronto	2–5–1	3–4–1	6–1–1	7–1	6–2	1–4–3	—

== Schedule and results ==
1939–40 regular season
November

Game	Result	Date	Score	Opponent	Record
1	W	November 5, 1939	8–2	Chicago Black Hawks (1939–40)	1–0–0
2	W	November 9, 1939	2–0	New York Americans (1939–40)	2–0–0
3	T	November 16, 1939	3–3 OT	Boston Bruins (1939–40)	2–0–1
4	W	November 19, 1939	2–1 OT	@ New York Rangers (1939–40)	3–0–1
5	W	November 21, 1939	2–1	@ Boston Bruins (1939–40)	4–0–1
6	T	November 23, 1939	1–1 OT	New York Rangers (1939–40)	4–0–2
7	L	November 25, 1939	4–6	Detroit Red Wings (1939–40)	4–1–2
8	L	November 30, 1939	2–5	@ New York Americans (1939–40)	4–2–2

December

Game	Result	Date	Score	Opponent	Record
9	W	December 3, 1939	3–1	@ Detroit Red Wings (1939–40)	5–2–2
10	W	December 7, 1939	4–1	Toronto Maple Leafs (1939–40)	6–2–2
11	L	December 9, 1939	0–3	@ Toronto Maple Leafs (1939–40)	6–3–2
12	L	December 10, 1939	2–3	@ Chicago Black Hawks (1939–40)	6–4–2
13	W	December 14, 1939	5–3 OT	New York Americans (1939–40)	7–4–2
14	L	December 16, 1939	2–4	New York Rangers (1939–40)	7–5–2
15	L	December 19, 1939	2–5	@ New York Rangers (1939–40)	7–6–2
16	L	December 21, 1939	2–3	Boston Bruins (1939–40)	7–7–2
17	L	December 25, 1939	1–3	@ Detroit Red Wings (1939–40)	7–8–2
18	L	December 28, 1939	4–6	Toronto Maple Leafs (1939–40)	7–9–2
19	L	December 31, 1939	1–6	@ Boston Bruins (1939–40)	7–10–2

January

Game	Result	Date	Score	Opponent	Record
20	L	January 1, 1940	0–1	@ New York Americans (1939–40)	7–11–2
21	L	January 4, 1940	2–3	Detroit Red Wings (1939–40)	7–12–2
22	L	January 6, 1940	1–3	@ Toronto Maple Leafs (1939–40)	7–13–2
23	W	January 7, 1940	2–1	@ Chicago Black Hawks (1939–40)	8–13–2
24	L	January 9, 1940	0–2	Chicago Black Hawks (1939–40)	8–14–2
25	L	January 14, 1940	2–4	@ Boston Bruins (1939–40)	8–15–2
26	L	January 16, 1940	1–6	Boston Bruins (1939–40)	8–16–2
27	L	January 18, 1940	0–1	New York Rangers (1939–40)	8–17–2
28	T	January 25, 1940	2–2 OT	New York Americans (1939–40)	8–17–3
29	L	January 27, 1940	1–3	@ Toronto Maple Leafs (1939–40)	8–18–3
30	L	January 28, 1940	1–8	@ Chicago Black Hawks (1939–40)	8–19–3
31	L	January 30, 1940	1–4	@ New York Americans (1939–40)	8–20–3

February

Game	Result	Date	Score	Opponent	Record
32	L	February 4, 1940	0–9	@ New York Rangers (1939–40)	8–21–3
33	L	February 8, 1940	1–2	Detroit Red Wings (1939–40)	8–22–3
34	W	February 11, 1940	3–2 OT	@ Detroit Red Wings (1939–40)	9–22–3
35	T	February 15, 1940	1–1 OT	Chicago Black Hawks (1939–40)	9–22–4
36	L	February 17, 1940	1–3	@ Toronto Maple Leafs (1939–40)	9–23–4
37	L	February 18, 1940	1–2	Toronto Maple Leafs (1939–40)	9–24–4
38	L	February 22, 1940	1–10	@ Chicago Black Hawks (1939–40)	9–25–4
39	L	February 24, 1940	0–2	New York Rangers (1939–40)	9–26–4
40	L	February 25, 1940	2–6	@ New York Rangers (1939–40)	9–27–4
41	L	February 29, 1940	2–4	Boston Bruins (1939–40)	9–28–4

March

Game	Result	Date	Score	Opponent	Record
42	T	March 2, 1940	3–3 OT	New York Americans (1939–40)	9–28–5
43	L	March 3, 1940	0–3	@ New York Americans (1939–40)	9–29–5
44	L	March 7, 1940	1–6	Chicago Black Hawks (1939–40)	9–30–5
45	W	March 9, 1940	3–0	Detroit Red Wings (1939–40)	10–30–5
46	L	March 10, 1940	2–5	@ Detroit Red Wings (1939–40)	10–31–5
47	L	March 14, 1940	4–8	Toronto Maple Leafs (1939–40)	10–32–5
48	L	March 17, 1940	2–7	@ Boston Bruins (1939–40)	10–33–5

Legend: Win (2 points) Loss (0 points) Tie (1 point)

== Player statistics ==
=== Regular season ===
==== Scoring ====
Player	Pos	GP	G	A	Pts	PIM
Toe Blake	LW	48	17	19	36	48
Charlie Sands	C/RW	47	9	20	29	10
Ray Getliffe	C/LW	46	11	12	23	29
Georges Mantha	D/LW	42	9	11	20	6
Lou Trudel	LW	47	12	7	19	24
Polly Drouin	LW	42	4	11	15	51
Marty Barry	C	30	4	10	14	2
Doug Young	D	47	3	9	12	22
Red Goupille	D	48	2	10	12	48
Paul Haynes	C	23	2	8	10	8
Johnny Gagnon	RW	10	4	5	9	0
Rod Lorrain	RW	41	1	5	6	6
Bill Summerhill	RW	13	3	2	5	24
Tony Demers	RW	14	2	3	5	2
Earl Robinson	RW/C	11	1	4	5	4
William Meronek	C	7	2	2	4	0
Armand Mondou	LW	21	2	2	4	0
Walt Buswell	D	46	1	3	4	10
Cy Wentworth	D	32	1	3	4	6
John Doran	D	6	0	3	3	6
Armand Raymond	D	11	0	1	1	0
Claude Bourque	G	36	0	0	0	0
Wilf Cude	G	7	0	0	0	0
Mike Karakas	G	5	0	0	0	0
Gus Mancuso	RW	2	0	0	0	0
Gordon Poirier	C	10	0	0	0	0
Rhys Thomson	D	7	0	0	0	16

==== Goaltending ====
Player	MIN	GP	W	L	T	GA	GAA	SO
Claude Bourque	2210	36	9	24	3	121	3.29	2
Wilf Cude	415	7	1	5	1	24	3.47	0
Mike Karakas	310	5	0	4	1	18	3.48	0
Charlie Sands	25	1	0	0	0	5	12.00	0
Team:	2960	48	10	33	5	168	3.41	2

Note:

Pos = Position;GP = Games played; G = Goals; A = Assists; Pts = Points; PIM = Penalty minutes; +/- = Plus/minus; PPG = Power-play goals; SHG = Short-handed goals; GWG = Game-winning goals
Pos = Position;GP = Games played; Min, TOI = Minutes played; W = Wins; L = Losses; T,T/OT = Ties; OTL = Overtime losses; GA = Goals-against; GAA = Goals-against average; SO = Shutouts; SA = Shots against; SV = Shots saved;SV% = Save percentage;

== Awards and records ==
=== All-Star teams ===
First Team	Position
Toe Blake	LW

== Transactions ==
May 15, 1939	To Montreal Canadiens cash	To Chicago Black Hawks Des Smith
October 10, 1939	To Boston Bruins Herb Cain	To Montreal Canadiens Ray Getliffe; Charlie Sands
October 11, 1939	To Montreal Canadiens Earl Robinson	To Chicago Black Hawks cash
November 29, 1939	To Boston Bruins George Brown	To Montreal Canadiens cash
January 4, 1940	To New York Americans Johnny Gagnon	To Montreal Canadiens cash
April 26, 1940	To Montreal Canadiens Herb Gardiner cash	To New York Rangers Claude Bourque

== See also ==
- 1939–40 NHL season
