= 1939–40 Boston Bruins season =

NHL team season

1939–40 Boston Bruins
- Prince of Wales Trophy winners
- League: 1st NHL
- 1939–40 record: 31–12–5
- Home record: 20–3–1
- Road record: 11–9–4
- Goals for: 170
- Goals against: 98

Team information
- General manager: Art Ross
- Coach: Cooney Weiland
- Captain: Dit Clapper
- Arena: Boston Garden

Team leaders
- Goals: Milt Schmidt (22); Woody Dumart (22)
- Assists: Milt Schmidt (30)
- Points: Milt Schmidt (52)
- Penalty minutes: Jack Shewchuk (55)
- Wins: Frank Brimsek (31)
- Goals against average: Frank Brimsek (1.99)

The 1939–40 Boston Bruins season was the Boston Bruins' 16th season of operation in the National Hockey League (NHL). The Bruins finished first over-all, but could not repeat as Stanley Cup champions, losing in the playoff semi-final to the New York Rangers.

== Regular season ==
=== Final standings ===
National Hockey League
	GP	W	L	T	GF	GA	PIM	Pts
**Boston Bruins**	48	31	12	5	170	98	330	67
**New York Rangers**	48	27	11	10	136	77	520	64
**Toronto Maple Leafs**	48	25	17	6	134	110	485	56
**Chicago Black Hawks**	48	23	19	6	112	120	351	52
**Detroit Red Wings**	48	16	26	6	91	126	250	38
**New York Americans**	48	15	29	4	106	140	236	34
Montreal Canadiens	48	10	33	5	90	167	338	25

Note: GP = Games Played, W = Wins, L = Losses, T = Ties, GF = Goals For, GA = Goals Against, PIM = Penalty Minutes, Pts = Points
Teams that qualified for the playoffs are highlighted in bold.

=== Record vs. opponents ===
1939–40 NHL Records
Team	BOS	CHI	DET	MTL	NYA	NYR	TOR
Boston	—	6–1–1	5–3	6–1–1	7–1	2–4–2	5–2–1
Chicago	1–6–1	—	6–0–2	5–2–1	3–4–1	4–4	4–3–1
Detroit	3–5	0–6–2	—	5–3	5–3	2–3–2	1–6–1
Montreal	1–6–1	2–5–1	3–5	—	2–4–2	1–6–1	1–7
N.Y. Americans	1–7	4–3–1	3–5	4–2–2	—	1–6–1	2–6
N.Y. Rangers	4–2–2	4–4	3–2–2	6–1–1	6–1–1	—	4–1–3
Toronto	2–5–1	3–4–1	6–1–1	7–1	6–2	1–4–3	—

== Schedule and results ==
1939–40 regular season
November

Game	Result	Date	Score	Opponent	Record
1	L	November 4, 1939	0–5	@ Toronto Maple Leafs (1939–40)	0–1–0
2	L	November 12, 1939	1–2	@ Detroit Red Wings (1939–40)	0–2–0
3	W	November 14, 1939	3–1 OT	Chicago Black Hawks (1939–40)	1–2–0
4	T	November 16, 1939	3–3 OT	@ Montreal Canadiens (1939–40)	1–2–1
5	W	November 19, 1939	2–0	@ Chicago Black Hawks (1939–40)	2–2–1
6	L	November 21, 1939	1–2	Montreal Canadiens (1939–40)	2–3–1
7	T	November 26, 1939	2–2 OT	New York Rangers (1939–40)	2–3–2
8	W	November 28, 1939	6–2	Toronto Maple Leafs (1939–40)	3–3–2

December

Game	Result	Date	Score	Opponent	Record
9	W	December 3, 1939	6–2	@ New York Americans (1939–40)	4–3–2
10	W	December 5, 1939	2–1	New York Americans (1939–40)	5–3–2
11	W	December 8, 1939	3–0	@ Detroit Red Wings (1939–40)	6–3–2
12	L	December 10, 1939	2–3	@ New York Rangers (1939–40)	6–4–2
13	W	December 12, 1939	3–1	Detroit Red Wings (1939–40)	7–4–2
14	T	December 14, 1939	1–1 OT	@ Toronto Maple Leafs (1939–40)	7–4–3
15	W	December 17, 1939	4–2	@ Chicago Black Hawks (1939–40)	8–4–3
16	W	December 19, 1939	3–2 OT	Toronto Maple Leafs (1939–40)	9–4–3
17	W	December 21, 1939	3–2	@ Montreal Canadiens (1939–40)	10–4–3
18	W	December 24, 1939	3–2	@ New York Americans (1939–40)	11–4–3
19	W	December 25, 1939	6–3	Chicago Black Hawks (1939–40)	12–4–3
20	L	December 29, 1939	0–4	@ New York Rangers (1939–40)	12–5–3
21	W	December 31, 1939	6–1	Montreal Canadiens (1939–40)	13–5–3

January

Game	Result	Date	Score	Opponent	Record
22	L	January 2, 1940	4–6	New York Rangers (1939–40)	13–6–3
23	W	January 7, 1940	6–2	New York Americans (1939–40)	14–6–3
24	W	January 9, 1940	3–1	Detroit Red Wings (1939–40)	15–6–3
25	W	January 11, 1940	5–2	@ Toronto Maple Leafs (1939–40)	16–6–3
26	W	January 14, 1940	4–2	Montreal Canadiens (1939–40)	17–6–3
27	W	January 16, 1940	6–1	@ Montreal Canadiens (1939–40)	18–6–3
28	L	January 21, 1940	2–4	@ New York Rangers (1939–40)	18–7–3
29	W	January 23, 1940	4–1	Toronto Maple Leafs (1939–40)	19–7–3
30	T	January 25, 1940	2–2 OT	@ Chicago Black Hawks (1939–40)	19–7–4
31	L	January 28, 1940	2–4	@ Detroit Red Wings (1939–40)	19–8–4
32	W	January 30, 1940	5–0	Chicago Black Hawks (1939–40)	20–8–4

February

Game	Result	Date	Score	Opponent	Record
33	W	February 4, 1940	7–1	New York Americans (1939–40)	21–8–4
34	W	February 6, 1940	6–2	New York Rangers (1939–40)	22–8–4
35	W	February 11, 1940	4–2	@ New York Americans (1939–40)	23–8–4
36	W	February 13, 1940	10–3	Detroit Red Wings (1939–40)	24–8–4
37	W	February 20, 1940	5–0	Toronto Maple Leafs (1939–40)	25–8–4
38	L	February 24, 1940	1–3	@ Toronto Maple Leafs (1939–40)	25–9–4
39	L	February 25, 1940	1–3	@ Chicago Black Hawks (1939–40)	25–10–4
40	W	February 27, 1940	6–0	Chicago Black Hawks (1939–40)	26–10–4
41	W	February 29, 1940	4–2	@ Montreal Canadiens (1939–40)	27–10–4

March

Game	Result	Date	Score	Opponent	Record
42	L	March 3, 1940	3–6	@ Detroit Red Wings (1939–40)	27–11–4
43	W	March 5, 1940	7–2	Detroit Red Wings (1939–40)	28–11–4
44	W	March 7, 1940	2–1	@ New York Americans (1939–40)	29–11–4
45	L	March 9, 1940	2–4	New York Americans (1939–40)	29–12–4
46	W	March 12, 1940	2–1	New York Rangers (1939–40)	30–12–4
47	T	March 14, 1940	0–0 OT	@ New York Rangers (1939–40)	30–12–5
48	W	March 17, 1940	7–2	Montreal Canadiens (1939–40)	31–12–5

Legend: Win (2 points) Loss (0 points) Tie (1 point)

== Playoffs ==
The Boston Bruins lost the semifinals to the New York Rangers 4–2

1940 Stanley Cup playoffs
Semifinals vs. (2) New York Rangers – Rangers win 4–2

Game	Date	Visitor	Score	Home	Series
1	March 19	Boston Bruins	0–4	New York Rangers	0–1
2	March 21	New York Rangers	3–4	Boston Bruins	1–1
3	March 24	New York Rangers	2–4	Boston Bruins	2–1
4	March 26	Boston Bruins	0–1	New York Rangers	2–2
5	March 28	New York Rangers	1–0	Boston Bruins	2–3
6	March 30	Boston Bruins	1–4	New York Rangers	2–4

Legend: Win Loss

== Player statistics ==
=== Regular season ===
Scoring

Player	Pos	GP	G	A	Pts	PIM
Milt Schmidt	C/D	48	22	30	52	37
Woody Dumart	LW	48	22	21	43	16
Bobby Bauer	RW	48	17	26	43	2
Bill Cowley	C	48	13	27	40	24
Herb Cain	LW	48	21	10	31	30
Roy Conacher	LW	31	18	12	30	9
Dit Clapper	RW/D	44	10	18	28	25
Flash Hollett	D	44	10	18	28	18
Art Jackson	C	46	7	18	25	6
Mel Hill	RW	38	9	11	20	19
Red Hamill	LW	30	10	8	18	16
Gord Pettinger	C	24	2	6	8	2
Eddie Wiseman	RW	18	2	6	8	0
Jack Shewchuk	D	47	2	4	6	55
Jack Crawford	D	35	1	4	5	26
Jack Portland	D	28	0	5	5	16
Des Smith	D	20	2	2	4	23
Eddie Shore	D	4	2	1	3	4
Frank Brimsek	G	48	0	0	0	0
Pat McReavy	C	2	0	0	0	2

Goaltending

Player	MIN	GP	W	L	T	GA	GAA	SO
Frank Brimsek	2950	48	31	12	5	98	1.99	6
Team:	2950	48	31	12	5	98	1.99	6

=== Playoffs ===
Scoring

Player	Pos	GP	G	A	Pts	PIM
Herb Cain	LW	6	1	3	4	2
Roy Conacher	LW	6	2	1	3	0
Eddie Wiseman	RW	6	2	1	3	2
Flash Hollett	D	5	1	2	3	2
Art Jackson	C	5	1	2	3	0
Dit Clapper	RW/D	5	0	2	2	2
Bobby Bauer	RW	6	1	0	1	2
Woody Dumart	LW	6	1	0	1	0
Bill Cowley	C	6	0	1	1	7
Red Hamill	LW	5	0	1	1	5
Terry Reardon	C/RW	1	0	1	1	0
Frank Brimsek	G	6	0	0	0	0
Jack Crawford	D	6	0	0	0	0
Mel Hill	RW	3	0	0	0	0
Milt Schmidt	C/D	6	0	0	0	0
Jack Shewchuk	D	6	0	0	0	0
Des Smith	D	6	0	0	0	0

Goaltending

Player	MIN	GP	W	L	GA	GAA	SO
Frank Brimsek	360	6	2	4	15	2.50	0
Team:	360	6	2	4	15	2.50	0

Note:

Pos = Position;GP = Games played; G = Goals; A = Assists; Pts = Points; PIM = Penalty minutes; +/- = Plus/minus; PPG = Power-play goals; SHG = Short-handed goals; GWG = Game-winning goals
Pos = Position;GP = Games played; Min, TOI = Minutes played; W = Wins; L = Losses; T,T/OT = Ties; OTL = Overtime losses; GA = Goals-against; GAA = Goals-against average; SO = Shutouts; SA = Shots against; SV = Shots saved;SV% = Save percentage;

== Awards and records ==
Lady Byng Trophy: (Excellence and sportsmanship)	Bobby Bauer
Prince of Wales Trophy: (Regular season champion)

=== All-Star teams ===
First Team	Position
Dit Clapper	D
Milt Schmidt	C
Second Team	Position
Frank Brimsek	G
Bobby Bauer	RW
Woody Dumart	LW

== Transactions ==
October 10, 1939	To Boston Bruins Herb Cain	To Montreal Canadiens Ray Getliffe; Charlie Sands
November 29, 1939	To Boston Bruins George Brown	To Montreal Canadiens cash
January 25, 1940	To Boston Bruins Ed Wiseman $5,000 cash	To New York Americans Eddie Shore
January 27, 1940	To Boston Bruins Des Smith	To Chicago Black Hawks Jack Portland

== See also ==
- 1939–40 NHL season
