= 1939–40 Toronto Maple Leafs season =

NHL hockey team season

1939–40 Toronto Maple Leafs
- League: 3rd NHL
- 1939–40 record: 25–17–6
- Home record: 15–3–6
- Road record: 10–14–0
- Goals for: 134
- Goals against: 110

Team information
- General manager: Conn Smythe
- Coach: Dick Irvin
- Captain: Red Horner
- Arena: Maple Leaf Gardens

Team leaders
- Goals: Gordie Drillon (21)
- Assists: Gordie Drillon (19)
- Points: Gordie Drillon (40)
- Penalty minutes: Red Horner (87)
- Wins: Turk Broda (25)
- Goals against average: Turk Broda (2.23)

The 1939–40 Toronto Maple Leafs season was Toronto's 23rd season of operation in the National Hockey League (NHL). The Maple Leafs again advanced to the Stanley Cup Finals, losing to the New York Rangers.

== Regular season ==
=== Final standings ===
National Hockey League
	GP	W	L	T	GF	GA	PIM	Pts
**Boston Bruins**	48	31	12	5	170	98	330	67
**New York Rangers**	48	27	11	10	136	77	520	64
**Toronto Maple Leafs**	48	25	17	6	134	110	485	56
**Chicago Black Hawks**	48	23	19	6	112	120	351	52
**Detroit Red Wings**	48	16	26	6	91	126	250	38
**New York Americans**	48	15	29	4	106	140	236	34
Montreal Canadiens	48	10	33	5	90	167	338	25

Note: GP = Games Played, W = Wins, L = Losses, T = Ties, GF = Goals For, GA = Goals Against, PIM = Penalty Minutes, Pts = Points
Teams that qualified for the playoffs are highlighted in bold.

=== Record vs. opponents ===
1939–40 NHL Records
Team	BOS	CHI	DET	MTL	NYA	NYR	TOR
Boston	—	6–1–1	5–3	6–1–1	7–1	2–4–2	5–2–1
Chicago	1–6–1	—	6–0–2	5–2–1	3–4–1	4–4	4–3–1
Detroit	3–5	0–6–2	—	5–3	5–3	2–3–2	1–6–1
Montreal	1–6–1	2–5–1	3–5	—	2–4–2	1–6–1	1–7
N.Y. Americans	1–7	4–3–1	3–5	4–2–2	—	1–6–1	2–6
N.Y. Rangers	4–2–2	4–4	3–2–2	6–1–1	6–1–1	—	4–1–3
Toronto	2–5–1	3–4–1	6–1–1	7–1	6–2	1–4–3	—

== Schedule and results ==
1939–40 regular season
November

Game	Result	Date	Score	Opponent	Record
1	W	November 4, 1939	5–0	Boston Bruins (1939–40)	1–0–0
2	T	November 11, 1939	1–1 OT	New York Rangers (1939–40)	1–0–1
3	W	November 12, 1939	1–0	@ New York Rangers (1939–40)	2–0–1
4	W	November 18, 1939	3–0	Detroit Red Wings (1939–40)	3–0–1
5	W	November 19, 1939	7–1	@ Detroit Red Wings (1939–40)	4–0–1
6	W	November 25, 1939	4–3	New York Americans (1939–40)	5–0–1
7	L	November 26, 1939	1–2 OT	@ New York Americans (1939–40)	5–1–1
8	L	November 28, 1939	2–6	@ Boston Bruins (1939–40)	5–2–1

December

Game	Result	Date	Score	Opponent	Record
9	T	December 2, 1939	3–3 OT	Chicago Black Hawks (1939–40)	5–2–2
10	W	December 3, 1939	3–1 OT	@ Chicago Black Hawks (1939–40)	6–2–2
11	L	December 7, 1939	1–4	@ Montreal Canadiens (1939–40)	6–3–2
12	W	December 9, 1939	3–0	Montreal Canadiens (1939–40)	7–3–2
13	T	December 14, 1939	1–1 OT	Boston Bruins (1939–40)	7–3–3
14	W	December 16, 1939	5–1	New York Americans (1939–40)	8–3–3
15	W	December 17, 1939	4–1	@ New York Americans (1939–40)	9–3–3
16	L	December 19, 1939	2–3 OT	@ Boston Bruins (1939–40)	9–4–3
17	L	December 21, 1939	1–3	@ Chicago Black Hawks (1939–40)	9–5–3
18	W	December 23, 1939	5–1	Detroit Red Wings (1939–40)	10–5–3
19	L	December 25, 1939	1–4	@ New York Rangers (1939–40)	10–6–3
20	W	December 28, 1939	6–4	@ Montreal Canadiens (1939–40)	11–6–3
21	W	December 30, 1939	4–2	Chicago Black Hawks (1939–40)	12–6–3
22	W	December 31, 1939	3–2	@ Detroit Red Wings (1939–40)	13–6–3

January

Game	Result	Date	Score	Opponent	Record
23	L	January 4, 1940	1–2	@ Chicago Black Hawks (1939–40)	13–7–3
24	W	January 6, 1940	3–1	Montreal Canadiens (1939–40)	14–7–3
25	W	January 9, 1940	3–2	@ New York Americans (1939–40)	15–7–3
26	L	January 11, 1940	2–5	Boston Bruins (1939–40)	15–8–3
27	L	January 13, 1940	1–4	New York Rangers (1939–40)	15–9–3
28	T	January 18, 1940	2–2 OT	Detroit Red Wings (1939–40)	15–9–4
29	W	January 20, 1940	5–1	New York Americans (1939–40)	16–9–4
30	L	January 21, 1940	2–3	@ Detroit Red Wings (1939–40)	16–10–4
31	L	January 23, 1940	1–4	@ Boston Bruins (1939–40)	16–11–4
32	L	January 25, 1940	0–3	@ New York Rangers (1939–40)	16–12–4
33	W	January 27, 1940	3–1	Montreal Canadiens (1939–40)	17–12–4

February

Game	Result	Date	Score	Opponent	Record
34	L	February 3, 1940	2–3	Chicago Black Hawks (1939–40)	17–13–4
35	L	February 8, 1940	1–2	@ New York Rangers (1939–40)	17–14–4
36	T	February 10, 1940	4–4 OT	New York Rangers (1939–40)	17–14–5
37	W	February 17, 1940	3–1	Montreal Canadiens (1939–40)	18–14–5
38	W	February 18, 1940	2–1	@ Montreal Canadiens (1939–40)	19–14–5
39	L	February 20, 1940	0–5	@ Boston Bruins (1939–40)	19–15–5
40	W	February 22, 1940	2–1	@ Detroit Red Wings (1939–40)	20–15–5
41	W	February 24, 1940	3–1	Boston Bruins (1939–40)	21–15–5
42	W	February 29, 1940	3–1	Detroit Red Wings (1939–40)	22–15–5

March

Game	Result	Date	Score	Opponent	Record
43	T	March 2, 1940	1–1 OT	New York Rangers (1939–40)	22–15–6
44	W	March 9, 1940	5–2	Chicago Black Hawks (1939–40)	23–15–6
45	L	March 10, 1940	1–2	@ Chicago Black Hawks (1939–40)	23–16–6
46	W	March 14, 1940	8–4	@ Montreal Canadiens (1939–40)	24–16–6
47	W	March 16, 1940	8–6	New York Americans (1939–40)	25–16–6
48	L	March 17, 1940	2–5	@ New York Americans (1939–40)	25–17–6

Legend: Win (2 points) Loss (0 points) Tie (1 point)

== Playoffs ==
The Maple Leafs played the Chicago Black Hawks and Detroit Red Wings in the first two rounds of the playoffs in best of three series, and swept both. In the finals, they played the New York Rangers in a best of seven series and lost 4–2.

== Player statistics ==
=== Regular season ===
Scoring

Player	Pos	GP	G	A	Pts	PIM
Gordie Drillon	RW	43	21	19	40	13
Syl Apps	C	27	13	17	30	5
Sweeney Schriner	LW	39	11	15	26	10
Bob Davidson	LW	48	8	18	26	56
Red Heron	C	42	11	12	23	12
Murph Chamberlain	LW	40	5	17	22	63
Pete Langelle	C	39	7	14	21	2
Pep Kelly	RW	34	11	9	20	15
Gus Marker	RW	42	10	9	19	15
Bingo Kampman	D	39	6	9	15	59
Lex Chisholm	C/RW	28	6	8	14	11
Nick Metz	LW	31	6	5	11	2
Hank Goldup	LW	21	6	4	10	2
Billy Taylor	C	29	4	6	10	9
Red Horner	D	31	1	9	10	87
Wally Stanowski	D	27	2	7	9	11
Bucko McDonald	D	34	2	5	7	13
Jack Church	D	31	1	4	5	62
Reg Hamilton	D	23	2	2	4	23
Don Metz	RW	10	1	1	2	4
Turk Broda	G	47	0	0	0	0
Phil Stein	G	1	0	0	0	0

Goaltending

Player	MIN	GP	W	L	T	GA	GAA	SO
Turk Broda	2900	47	25	17	5	108	2.23	4
Phil Stein	70	1	0	0	1	2	1.71	0
Team:	2970	48	25	17	6	110	2.22	4

=== Playoffs ===
Scoring

Player	Pos	GP	G	A	Pts	PIM
Syl Apps	C	10	5	2	7	2
Hank Goldup	LW	10	5	1	6	4
Gordie Drillon	RW	10	3	1	4	0
Gus Marker	RW	10	1	3	4	23
Nick Metz	LW	9	1	3	4	9
Sweeney Schriner	LW	9	1	3	4	4
Bob Davidson	LW	10	0	3	3	16
Pete Langelle	C	10	0	3	3	0
Red Heron	C	9	2	0	2	2
Jack Church	D	10	1	1	2	6
Red Horner	D	9	0	2	2	55
Wally Stanowski	D	10	1	0	1	2
Billy Taylor	C	2	1	0	1	0
Pep Kelly	RW	6	0	1	1	0
Turk Broda	G	10	0	0	0	0
Murph Chamberlain	LW	3	0	0	0	0
Reg Hamilton	D	10	0	0	0	0
Bingo Kampman	D	10	0	0	0	0
Bucko McDonald	D	1	0	0	0	0
Don Metz	RW	2	0	0	0	0

Goaltending

Player	MIN	GP	W	L	GA	GAA	SO
Turk Broda	657	10	6	4	19	1.74	1
Team:	657	10	6	4	19	1.74	1

Note:

Pos = Position;GP = Games played; G = Goals; A = Assists; Pts = Points; PIM = Penalty minutes; +/- = Plus/minus; PPG = Power-play goals; SHG = Short-handed goals; GWG = Game-winning goals
Pos = Position;GP = Games played; Min, TOI = Minutes played; W = Wins; L = Losses; T,T/OT = Ties; OTL = Overtime losses; GA = Goals-against; GAA = Goals-against average; SO = Shutouts; SA = Shots against; SV = Shots saved;SV% = Save percentage;

== Transactions ==
- May 18, 1939: Acquired Sweeney Schriner from the New York Americans for Murray Armstrong, Buzz Boll, Busher Jackson and Doc Romnes
- July 1, 1939: Charlie Conacher returned from the Detroit Red Wings after Detroit failed to renew contract
- September 1, 1939: Signed Free Agent Clarence Drouillard
- September 22, 1939: Traded Charlie Conacher to the New York Americans for Future Considerations
- October 13, 1939: Traded Chuck Shannon to the New York Americans for cash
- October 13, 1939: Traded Jack Howard to the St. Louis Flyers of the AHA for cash

== See also ==
- 1939–40 NHL season
