= 1939–40 Detroit Red Wings season =

National Hockey League team season

1939–40 Detroit Red Wings
- League: 5th NHL
- 1939–40 record: 16–26–6
- Home record: 11–10–3
- Road record: 5–16–3
- Goals for: 91
- Goals against: 126

Team information
- General manager: Jack Adams
- Coach: Jack Adams
- Captain: Ebbie Goodfellow
- Arena: Detroit Olympia

Team leaders
- Goals: Syd Howe (14)
- Assists: Syd Howe (23)
- Points: Syd Howe (37)
- Penalty minutes: Jimmy Orlando (54)
- Wins: Tiny Thompson (16)
- Goals against average: Tiny Thompson (2.54)

The 1939–40 Detroit Red Wings season was the 14th season for the Detroit NHL franchise, eighth as the Red Wings.

== Regular season ==
=== Final standings ===
National Hockey League
	GP	W	L	T	GF	GA	PIM	Pts
**Boston Bruins**	48	31	12	5	170	98	330	67
**New York Rangers**	48	27	11	10	136	77	520	64
**Toronto Maple Leafs**	48	25	17	6	134	110	485	56
**Chicago Black Hawks**	48	23	19	6	112	120	351	52
**Detroit Red Wings**	48	16	26	6	91	126	250	38
**New York Americans**	48	15	29	4	106	140	236	34
Montreal Canadiens	48	10	33	5	90	167	338	25

Note: GP = Games Played, W = Wins, L = Losses, T = Ties, GF = Goals For, GA = Goals Against, PIM = Penalty Minutes, Pts = Points
Teams that qualified for the playoffs are highlighted in bold.

=== Record vs. opponents ===
1939–40 NHL Records
Team	BOS	CHI	DET	MTL	NYA	NYR	TOR
Boston	—	6–1–1	5–3	6–1–1	7–1	2–4–2	5–2–1
Chicago	1–6–1	—	6–0–2	5–2–1	3–4–1	4–4	4–3–1
Detroit	3–5	0–6–2	—	5–3	5–3	2–3–2	1–6–1
Montreal	1–6–1	2–5–1	3–5	—	2–4–2	1–6–1	1–7
N.Y. Americans	1–7	4–3–1	3–5	4–2–2	—	1–6–1	2–6
N.Y. Rangers	4–2–2	4–4	3–2–2	6–1–1	6–1–1	—	4–1–3
Toronto	2–5–1	3–4–1	6–1–1	7–1	6–2	1–4–3	—

== Schedule and results ==
1939–40 regular season
November

Game	Result	Date	Score	Opponent	Record
1	L	November 2, 1939	2–3	@ Chicago Black Hawks (1939–40)	0–1–0
2	T	November 5, 1939	1–1 OT	New York Rangers (1939–40)	0–1–1
3	W	November 12, 1939	2–1	Boston Bruins (1939–40)	1–1–1
4	W	November 14, 1939	4–2	@ New York Americans (1939–40)	2–1–1
5	L	November 18, 1939	0–3	@ Toronto Maple Leafs (1939–40)	2–2–1
6	L	November 19, 1939	1–7	Toronto Maple Leafs (1939–40)	2–3–1
7	W	November 23, 1939	3–2	New York Americans (1939–40)	3–3–1
8	W	November 25, 1939	6–4	@ Montreal Canadiens (1939–40)	4–3–1
9	L	November 26, 1939	2–4 OT	Chicago Black Hawks (1939–40)	4–4–1
10	L	November 28, 1939	1–4	@ New York Rangers (1939–40)	4–5–1

December

Game	Result	Date	Score	Opponent	Record
11	L	December 3, 1939	1–3	Montreal Canadiens (1939–40)	4–6–1
12	L	December 8, 1939	0–3	Boston Bruins (1939–40)	4–7–1
13	L	December 10, 1939	2–3	New York Americans (1939–40)	4–8–1
14	L	December 12, 1939	1–3	@ Boston Bruins (1939–40)	4–9–1
15	T	December 14, 1939	2–2 OT	@ New York Rangers (1939–40)	4–9–2
16	T	December 17, 1939	0–0 OT	New York Rangers (1939–40)	4–9–3
17	L	December 21, 1939	0–3	@ New York Americans (1939–40)	4–10–3
18	L	December 23, 1939	1–5	@ Toronto Maple Leafs (1939–40)	4–11–3
19	W	December 25, 1939	3–1	Montreal Canadiens (1939–40)	5–11–3
20	L	December 31, 1939	2–3	Toronto Maple Leafs (1939–40)	5–12–3

January

Game	Result	Date	Score	Opponent	Record
21	L	January 1, 1940	0–1	@ Chicago Black Hawks (1939–40)	5–13–3
22	W	January 4, 1940	3–2	@ Montreal Canadiens (1939–40)	6–13–3
23	L	January 7, 1940	0–3	@ New York Rangers (1939–40)	6–14–3
24	L	January 9, 1940	1–3	@ Boston Bruins (1939–40)	6–15–3
25	W	January 12, 1940	4–2	New York Americans (1939–40)	7–15–3
26	L	January 14, 1940	0–1	@ New York Americans (1939–40)	7–16–3
27	T	January 18, 1940	2–2 OT	@ Toronto Maple Leafs (1939–40)	7–16–4
28	W	January 21, 1940	3–2	Toronto Maple Leafs (1939–40)	8–16–4
29	T	January 26, 1940	1–1 OT	Chicago Black Hawks (1939–40)	8–16–5
30	W	January 28, 1940	4–2	Boston Bruins (1939–40)	9–16–5

February

Game	Result	Date	Score	Opponent	Record
31	W	February 1, 1940	2–0	New York Rangers (1939–40)	10–16–5
32	T	February 4, 1940	1–1 OT	@ Chicago Black Hawks (1939–40)	10–16–6
33	W	February 6, 1940	3–1	@ New York Americans (1939–40)	11–16–6
34	W	February 8, 1940	2–1	@ Montreal Canadiens (1939–40)	12–16–6
35	L	February 9, 1940	0–3	Chicago Black Hawks (1939–40)	12–17–6
36	L	February 11, 1940	2–3 OT	Montreal Canadiens (1939–40)	12–18–6
37	L	February 13, 1940	3–10	@ Boston Bruins (1939–40)	12–19–6
38	L	February 15, 1940	1–3	@ New York Rangers (1939–40)	12–20–6
39	W	February 18, 1940	2–0	New York Rangers (1939–40)	13–20–6
40	L	February 22, 1940	1–2	Toronto Maple Leafs (1939–40)	13–21–6
41	W	February 25, 1940	4–1	New York Americans (1939–40)	14–21–6
42	L	February 29, 1940	1–3	@ Toronto Maple Leafs (1939–40)	14–22–6

March

Game	Result	Date	Score	Opponent	Record
43	W	March 3, 1940	6–3	Boston Bruins (1939–40)	15–22–6
44	L	March 5, 1940	2–7	@ Boston Bruins (1939–40)	15–23–6
45	L	March 9, 1940	0–3	@ Montreal Canadiens (1939–40)	15–24–6
46	W	March 10, 1940	5–2	Montreal Canadiens (1939–40)	16–24–6
47	L	March 15, 1940	3–4	Chicago Black Hawks (1939–40)	16–25–6
48	L	March 17, 1940	1–3	@ Chicago Black Hawks (1939–40)	16–26–6

Legend: Win (2 points) Loss (0 points) Tie (1 point)

== Playoffs ==
=== (5) Detroit Red Wings vs. (6) New York Americans ===
New York Americans vs Detroit Red Wings
Date	Visitors	Score	Home	Score
Mar 19	New York A.	1	Detroit	2 (OT)
Mar 22	Detroit	4	New York A.	5
Mar 24	New York A.	1	Detroit	3

Detroit wins best-of-three series 2–1.

=== (3) Toronto Maple Leafs vs. (5) Detroit Red Wings ===
Detroit Red Wings vs Toronto Maple Leafs
Date	Visitors	Score	Home	Score
Mar 26	Detroit	1	Toronto	2
Mar 28	Toronto	3	Detroit	1

Toronto wins best-of-three series 2–0.

== Player statistics ==
=== Regular season ===
Scoring

Player	Pos	GP	G	A	Pts	PIM
Syd Howe	C/LW	46	14	23	37	17
Ebbie Goodfellow	C/D	43	11	17	28	31
Mud Bruneteau	RW	48	10	14	24	10
Alex Motter	C	37	7	12	19	28
Ken Kilrea	LW	40	10	8	18	4
Cecil Dillon	RW	44	7	10	17	12
Connie Brown	C	36	8	3	11	2
Gus Giesebrecht	C	30	4	7	11	2
Carl Liscombe	LW	25	2	7	9	4
Eddie Wares	D/RW	33	2	6	8	19
Butch McDonald	LW/C	37	1	6	7	2
Don Deacon	LW	18	5	1	6	2
Joe Fisher	RW	34	2	4	6	2
Sid Abel	C/LW	24	1	5	6	4
Don Grosso	LW/C	29	2	3	5	11
Jimmy Orlando	D	48	1	3	4	54
Jack Keating	LW	10	2	0	2	2
Ralph Bowman	D	11	0	2	2	4
Jack Stewart	D	48	1	0	1	40
Claude Bourque	G	1	0	0	0	0
Ron Hudson	C	1	0	0	0	0
Buck Jones	D	2	0	0	0	0
Hec Kilrea	LW	12	0	0	0	0
Alfie Moore	G	1	0	0	0	0
Bert Peer	RW	1	0	0	0	0
Tiny Thompson	G	46	0	0	0	0

Goaltending

Player	MIN	GP	W	L	T	GA	GAA	SO
Tiny Thompson	2830	46	16	24	6	120	2.54	3
Claude Bourque	60	1	0	1	0	3	3.00	0
Alfie Moore	60	1	0	1	0	3	3.00	0
Team:	2950	48	16	26	6	126	2.56	3

=== Playoffs ===
Scoring

Player	Pos	GP	G	A	Pts	PIM
Mud Bruneteau	RW	5	3	2	5	0
Syd Howe	C/LW	5	2	2	4	2
Connie Brown	C	5	2	1	3	0
Sid Abel	C/LW	5	0	3	3	21
Joe Fisher	RW	5	1	1	2	0
Ken Kilrea	LW	5	1	1	2	0
Alex Motter	C	5	1	1	2	15
Ebbie Goodfellow	C/D	5	0	2	2	9
Butch McDonald	LW/C	5	0	2	2	10
Cecil Dillon	RW	5	1	0	1	0
Don Grosso	LW/C	5	0	0	0	0
Jimmy Orlando	D	5	0	0	0	15
Jack Stewart	D	5	0	0	0	4
Tiny Thompson	G	5	0	0	0	0
Eddie Wares	D/RW	5	0	0	0	0

Goaltending

Player	MIN	GP	W	L	GA	GAA	SO
Tiny Thompson	300	5	2	3	12	2.40	0
Team:	300	5	2	3	12	2.40	0

Note: GP = Games played; G = Goals; A = Assists; Pts = Points; +/- = Plus-minus PIM = Penalty minutes; PPG = Power-play goals; SHG = Short-handed goals; GWG = Game-winning goals;
MIN = Minutes played; W = Wins; L = Losses; T = Ties; GA = Goals against; GAA = Goals-against average; SO = Shutouts;

== Awards and records ==
Hart Trophy: (Most valuable player)	Ebbie Goodfellow

=== All-Star teams ===
First Team	Position
Ebbie Goodfellow	D

== Transactions ==
May 17, 1939	To Detroit Red Wings rights to Cecil Dillon	To New York Rangers cash
November 7, 1939	To New York Americans cash	To Detroit Red Wings Alfie Moore

== See also ==
- 1939–40 NHL season
