= 1939–40 NHL transactions =

The following is a list of all team-to-team transactions that have occurred in the National Hockey League (NHL) during the 1939–40 NHL season. It lists which team each player has been traded to and for which player(s) or other consideration(s), if applicable.

== Transactions ==
May 15, 1939	To Montreal Canadiens cash	To Chicago Black Hawks Des Smith
May 17, 1939	To Detroit Red Wings rights to Cecil Dillon	To New York Rangers cash
May 17, 1939	To Chicago Black Hawks rights to George Allen rights to Bill Carse	To New York Rangers cash
May 18, 1939	To Toronto Maple Leafs Sweeney Schriner	To New York Americans Murray Armstrong; Buzz Boll; Busher Jackson; Elwyn Romnes
September 22, 1939	To Toronto Maple Leafs future considerations^{1} (cash)	To New York Americans Charlie Conacher
October 10, 1939	To Boston Bruins Herb Cain	To Montreal Canadiens Ray Getliffe; Charlie Sands
October 11, 1939	To Montreal Canadiens Earl Robinson	To Chicago Black Hawks cash
November 7, 1939	To New York Americans cash	To Detroit Red Wings Alfie Moore
November 29, 1939	To Boston Bruins George Brown	To Montreal Canadiens cash
January 4, 1940	To New York Americans Johnny Gagnon	To Montreal Canadiens cash
January 25, 1940	To Boston Bruins Ed Wiseman $5,000 cash	To New York Americans Eddie Shore
January 27, 1940	To Boston Bruins Des Smith	To Chicago Black Hawks Jack Portland
April 26, 1940	To Montreal Canadiens Herb Gardiner cash	To New York Rangers Claude Bourque

1. Transaction completed on May 21, 1940.
