= 1939–40 New York Rangers season =

NHL hockey team season (won Stanley Cup)

1939–40 New York Rangers
- Stanley Cup champions
- League: 2nd NHL
- 1939–40 record: 27–11–10
- Home record: 17–4–3
- Road record: 10–7–7
- Goals for: 136
- Goals against: 77

Team information
- General manager: Lester Patrick
- Coach: Frank Boucher
- Captain: Art Coulter
- Arena: Madison Square Garden

Team leaders
- Goals: Bryan Hextall (24)
- Assists: Phil Watson (28)
- Points: Bryan Hextall (39)
- Penalty minutes: Art Coulter (68)
- Wins: Dave Kerr (27)
- Goals against average: Dave Kerr (1.54)

The 1939–40 New York Rangers season was the franchise's 14th season. With new coach Frank Boucher the Rangers finish in 2nd place again with an impressive 27–11–10 record. In the semi-finals the Rangers beat the Boston Bruins in 6 games to advance to the 1940 Stanley Cup Finals. In the finals the Rangers won their first 2 games by scores of 2–1 and 6–2 at the Garden, before finishing the series on the road because of the circus. After dropping the first 2 games in Toronto the Rangers won a critical Game five 2–1 in overtime on Muzz Patrick's overtime goal. In Game 6 it would take overtime again as the Rangers won their 3rd Stanley Cup on Bryan Hextall's goal 2:33 into OT. Following the season the Rangers would celebrate buying out their lease at Madison Square Garden by burning the lease in the historic Stanley Cup, a move that would take on greater mystery in coming years.

== Regular season ==
=== Season standings ===
National Hockey League
	GP	W	L	T	GF	GA	PIM	Pts
**Boston Bruins**	48	31	12	5	170	98	330	67
**New York Rangers**	48	27	11	10	136	77	520	64
**Toronto Maple Leafs**	48	25	17	6	134	110	485	56
**Chicago Black Hawks**	48	23	19	6	112	120	351	52
**Detroit Red Wings**	48	16	26	6	91	126	250	38
**New York Americans**	48	15	29	4	106	140	236	34
Montreal Canadiens	48	10	33	5	90	167	338	25

Note: GP = Games Played, W = Wins, L = Losses, T = Ties, GF = Goals For, GA = Goals Against, PIM = Penalty Minutes, Pts = Points
Teams that qualified for the playoffs are highlighted in bold.

=== Record vs. opponents ===
1939–40 NHL Records
Team	BOS	CHI	DET	MTL	NYA	NYR	TOR
Boston	—	6–1–1	5–3	6–1–1	7–1	2–4–2	5–2–1
Chicago	1–6–1	—	6–0–2	5–2–1	3–4–1	4–4	4–3–1
Detroit	3–5	0–6–2	—	5–3	5–3	2–3–2	1–6–1
Montreal	1–6–1	2–5–1	3–5	—	2–4–2	1–6–1	1–7
N.Y. Americans	1–7	4–3–1	3–5	4–2–2	—	1–6–1	2–6
N.Y. Rangers	4–2–2	4–4	3–2–2	6–1–1	6–1–1	—	4–1–3
Toronto	2–5–1	3–4–1	6–1–1	7–1	6–2	1–4–3	—

== Schedule and results ==
1939–40 regular season
November: 3–3–4 (home: 1–3–0; road: 2–0–4)

Game	November	Opponent	Score	Record
1	5	@ Detroit Red Wings	1 – 1 OT	0–0–1
2	11	@ Toronto Maple Leafs	1 – 1 OT	0–0–2
3	12	Toronto Maple Leafs	1–0	0–1–2
4	16	Chicago Black Hawks	3–2	0–2–2
5	18	@ New York Americans	3–1	1–2–2
6	19	Montreal Canadiens	2 – 1 OT	1–3–2
7	23	@ Montreal Canadiens	1 – 1 OT	1–3–3
8	26	@ Boston Bruins	2 – 2 OT	1–3–4
9	28	Detroit Red Wings	4–1	2–3–4
10	30	@ Chicago Black Hawks	7–2	3–3–4

December: 7–0–3 (home: 6–0–2; road: 1–0–1)

Game	December	Opponent	Score	Record
11	2	New York Americans	1 – 1 OT	3–3–5
12	10	Boston Bruins	3–2	4–3–5
13	14	Detroit Red Wings	2 – 2 OT	4–3–6
14	16	@ Montreal Canadiens	4–2	5–3–6
15	17	@ Detroit Red Wings	0 – 0 OT	5–3–7
16	19	Montreal Canadiens	5–2	6–3–7
17	23	Chicago Black Hawks	7–1	7–3–7
18	25	Toronto Maple Leafs	4–1	8–3–7
19	29	Boston Bruins	4–0	9–3–7
20	31	New York Americans	5–2	10–3–7

January: 10–1–0 (home: 5–0–0; road: 5–1–0)

Game	January	Opponent	Score	Record
21	2	@ Boston Bruins	6–4	11–3–7
22	4	@ New York Americans	6–2	12–3–7
23	7	Detroit Red Wings	3–0	13–3–7
24	11	Chicago Black Hawks	5–3	14–3–7
25	13	@ Toronto Maple Leafs	4–1	15–3–7
26	14	@ Chicago Black Hawks	2–1	15–4–7
27	18	@ Montreal Canadiens	1–0	16–4–7
28	21	Boston Bruins	4–2	17–4–7
29	23	@ New York Americans	5–3	18–4–7
30	25	Toronto Maple Leafs	3–0	19–4–7
31	28	New York Americans	4–2	20–4–7

February: 5–5–1 (home: 4–1–0; road: 1–4–1)

Game	February	Opponent	Score	Record
32	1	@ Detroit Red Wings	2–0	20–5–7
33	4	Montreal Canadiens	9–0	21–5–7
34	6	@ Boston Bruins	6–2	21–6–7
35	8	Toronto Maple Leafs	2–1	22–6–7
36	10	@ Toronto Maple Leafs	4 – 4 OT	22–6–8
37	11	@ Chicago Black Hawks	3–0	22–7–8
38	15	Detroit Red Wings	3–1	23–7–8
39	18	@ Detroit Red Wings	2–0	23–8–8
40	22	@ New York Americans	1 – 0 OT	23–9–8
41	24	@ Montreal Canadiens	2–0	24–9–8
42	25	Montreal Canadiens	6–2	25–9–8
43	29	Chicago Black Hawks	2–1	25–10–8

March: 2–1–2 (home: 1–0–1; road: 1–1–1)

Game	March	Opponent	Score	Record
44	2	@ Toronto Maple Leafs	1 – 1 OT	25–10–9
45	3	@ Chicago Black Hawks	2–1	26–10–9
46	10	New York Americans	4–2	27–10–9
47	12	@ Boston Bruins	2–1	27–11–9
48	14	Boston Bruins	0 – 0 OT	27–11–10

Legend: Win (2 points) Loss (0 points) Tie (1 point)

== Playoffs ==
=== Stanley Cup Finals ===
The final series between the Rangers and the Maple Leafs was an exciting one that went back and forth with three overtime games. The Rangers took the first two at home and the Leafs took the next two in Toronto. The circus forced the Rangers to vacate Madison Square Garden after the first two games. The Rangers would score three game-winning goals in overtime, including the Cup winner. Lynn and Murray Patrick played for the Rangers, and became the third and fourth members of the Patrick family to win the Stanley Cup. Bryan Hextall scored in overtime in the final game to give the Rangers their 3rd Stanley Cup and last until 1994.

1940 Stanley Cup playoffs
Semifinals vs. (1) Boston Bruins – New York wins 4–2

Game	Date	Visitor	Score	Home	OT	Series
1	March 19	Boston Bruins	0–4	New York Rangers		New York Rangers lead series 1–0
2	March 21	New York Rangers	2–4	Boston Bruins		Series tied 1–1
3	March 24	New York Rangers	3–4	Boston Bruins		Boston leads series 2–1
4	March 26	Boston Bruins	0–1	New York Rangers		Series tied 2–2
5	March 28	New York Rangers	1–0	Boston Bruins		New York Rangers lead series 3–2
6	March 30	Boston Bruins	1–4	New York Rangers		New York Rangers win series 4–2

Stanley Cup Finals vs. (3) Toronto Maple Leafs – New York wins 4–2

Game	Date	Visitor	Score	Home	OT	Series
1	April 2	Toronto Maple Leafs	1–2	New York Rangers	OT	New York Rangers lead series 1–0
2	April 3	Toronto Maple Leafs	2–6	New York Rangers		New York Rangers lead series 2–0
3	April 6	New York Rangers	1–2	Toronto Maple Leafs		New York Rangers lead series 2–1
4	April 9	New York Rangers	0–3	Toronto Maple Leafs		Series tied 2–2
5	April 11	New York Rangers	2–1	Toronto Maple Leafs	OT	New York Rangers lead series 3–2
6	April 13	New York Rangers	3–2	Toronto Maple Leafs	OT	New York Rangers win series 4–2

Legend: Win Loss

== Player statistics ==
Skaters

Regular season
Player	GP	G	A	Pts	PIM
Bryan Hextall	48	24	15	39	52
Neil Colville	48	19	19	38	22
Phil Watson	48	7	28	35	52
Alex Shibicky	43	11	21	32	33
Wilbert Hiller	48	13	18	31	57
James MacDonald	44	15	13	28	19
Lynn Patrick	48	12	16	28	34
Clint Smith	41	8	16	24	2
Mac Colville	47	7	14	21	12
Ehrhardt Heller	47	5	14	19	26
Alf Pike	47	8	9	17	38
Walter Pratt	48	4	13	17	61
Arthur Coulter	48	1	9	10	68
Murray Patrick	46	2	4	6	44
Stanford Smith	1	0	0	0	0
John Polich	1	0	0	0	0
Cliff Barton	3	0	0	0	0

Playoffs
Player	GP	G	A	Pts	PIM
Phil Watson	12	3	6	9	16
Neil Colville	12	2	7	9	18
Alex Shibicky	12	2	5	7	4
Bryan Hextall	12	4	3	7	11
Wilbert Hiller	12	2	4	6	2
Mac Colville	12	3	2	5	6
Walter Pratt	12	3	1	4	18
Alf Pike	12	3	1	4	6
Clint Smith	12	1	3	4	2
Lynn Patrick	12	2	2	4	4
Murray Patrick	12	3	0	3	13
Ehrhardt Heller	12	0	3	3	12
James MacDonald	12	0	2	2	4
Arthur Coulter	12	1	0	1	21

Goaltenders

Regular season
Player	GP	TOI	W	L	T	GA	GAA	SO
Dave Kerr	48	3000	27	11	10	77	1.54	8

Playoffs
Player	GP	TOI	W	L	GA	GAA	SO
Dave Kerr	12	770	8	4	20	1.56	3

^{†}Denotes player spent time with another team before joining Rangers. Stats reflect time with Rangers only.
^{‡}Traded mid-season. Stats reflect time with Rangers only.

Note:

Pos = Position;GP = Games played; G = Goals; A = Assists; Pts = Points; PIM = Penalty minutes; +/- = Plus/minus; PPG = Power-play goals; SHG = Short-handed goals; GWG = Game-winning goals
Pos = Position;GP = Games played; Min, TOI = Minutes played; W = Wins; L = Losses; T,T/OT = Ties; OTL = Overtime losses; GA = Goals-against; GAA = Goals-against average; SO = Shutouts; SA = Shots against; SV = Shots saved;SV% = Save percentage;

== Awards and records ==
- Calder Memorial Trophy: Kilby MacDonald
- Vezina Trophy: Dave Kerr
