= 1939–40 New York Americans season =

National Hockey League team season

1939–40 New York Americans
- League: 6th NHL
- 1939–40 record: 15–29–4
- Home record: 12–11–1
- Road record: 3–18–3
- Goals for: 106
- Goals against: 140

Team information
- Coach: Red Dutton
- Captain: Charlie Conacher
- Arena: Madison Square Garden

Team leaders
- Goals: Murray Armstrong (16)
- Assists: Murray Armstrong (20)
- Points: Murray Armstrong (36)
- Penalty minutes: Charlie Conacher; Hooley Smith (41)
- Wins: Earl Robertson (15)
- Goals against average: Earl Robertson (2.84)

The 1939–40 New York Americans season was the Americans' 15th season of play.

== Regular season ==
=== Final standings ===
National Hockey League
	GP	W	L	T	GF	GA	PIM	Pts
**Boston Bruins**	48	31	12	5	170	98	330	67
**New York Rangers**	48	27	11	10	136	77	520	64
**Toronto Maple Leafs**	48	25	17	6	134	110	485	56
**Chicago Black Hawks**	48	23	19	6	112	120	351	52
**Detroit Red Wings**	48	16	26	6	91	126	250	38
**New York Americans**	48	15	29	4	106	140	236	34
Montreal Canadiens	48	10	33	5	90	167	338	25

Note: GP = Games Played, W = Wins, L = Losses, T = Ties, GF = Goals For, GA = Goals Against, PIM = Penalty Minutes, Pts = Points
Teams that qualified for the playoffs are highlighted in bold.

=== Record vs. opponents ===
1939–40 NHL Records
Team	BOS	CHI	DET	MTL	NYA	NYR	TOR
Boston	—	6–1–1	5–3	6–1–1	7–1	2–4–2	5–2–1
Chicago	1–6–1	—	6–0–2	5–2–1	3–4–1	4–4	4–3–1
Detroit	3–5	0–6–2	—	5–3	5–3	2–3–2	1–6–1
Montreal	1–6–1	2–5–1	3–5	—	2–4–2	1–6–1	1–7
N.Y. Americans	1–7	4–3–1	3–5	4–2–2	—	1–6–1	2–6
N.Y. Rangers	4–2–2	4–4	3–2–2	6–1–1	6–1–1	—	4–1–3
Toronto	2–5–1	3–4–1	6–1–1	7–1	6–2	1–4–3	—

== Schedule and results ==
1939–40 regular season
November

Game	Result	Date	Score	Opponent	Record
1	L	November 9, 1939	0–2	@ Montreal Canadiens (1939–40)	0–1–0
2	L	November 12, 1939	1–2	@ Chicago Black Hawks (1939–40)	0–2–0
3	L	November 14, 1939	2–4	Detroit Red Wings (1939–40)	0–3–0
4	L	November 18, 1939	1–3	New York Rangers (1939–40)	0–4–0
5	L	November 23, 1939	2–3	@ Detroit Red Wings (1939–40)	0–5–0
6	L	November 25, 1939	3–4	@ Toronto Maple Leafs (1939–40)	0–6–0
7	W	November 26, 1939	2–1 OT	Toronto Maple Leafs (1939–40)	1–6–0
8	W	November 30, 1939	5–2	Montreal Canadiens (1939–40)	2–6–0

December

Game	Result	Date	Score	Opponent	Record
9	T	December 2, 1939	1–1 OT	@ New York Rangers (1939–40)	2–6–1
10	L	December 3, 1939	2–6	Boston Bruins (1939–40)	2–7–1
11	L	December 5, 1939	1–2	@ Boston Bruins (1939–40)	2–8–1
12	L	December 7, 1939	1–2	@ Chicago Black Hawks (1939–40)	2–9–1
13	W	December 10, 1939	3–2	@ Detroit Red Wings (1939–40)	3–9–1
14	W	December 12, 1939	4–0	Chicago Black Hawks (1939–40)	4–9–1
15	L	December 14, 1939	3–5 OT	@ Montreal Canadiens (1939–40)	4–10–1
16	L	December 16, 1939	1–5	@ Toronto Maple Leafs (1939–40)	4–11–1
17	L	December 17, 1939	1–4	Toronto Maple Leafs (1939–40)	4–12–1
18	W	December 21, 1939	3–0	Detroit Red Wings (1939–40)	5–12–1
19	L	December 24, 1939	2–3	Boston Bruins (1939–40)	5–13–1
20	W	December 27, 1939	4–2 OT	Chicago Black Hawks (1939–40)	6–13–1
21	L	December 31, 1939	2–5	@ New York Rangers (1939–40)	6–14–1

January

Game	Result	Date	Score	Opponent	Record
22	W	January 1, 1940	1–0	Montreal Canadiens (1939–40)	7–14–1
23	L	January 4, 1940	2–6	New York Rangers (1939–40)	7–15–1
24	L	January 7, 1940	2–6	@ Boston Bruins (1939–40)	7–16–1
25	L	January 9, 1940	2–3	Toronto Maple Leafs (1939–40)	7–17–1
26	L	January 12, 1940	2–4	@ Detroit Red Wings (1939–40)	7–18–1
27	W	January 14, 1940	1–0	Detroit Red Wings (1939–40)	8–18–1
28	L	January 20, 1940	1–5	@ Toronto Maple Leafs (1939–40)	8–19–1
29	W	January 21, 1940	2–1	@ Chicago Black Hawks (1939–40)	9–19–1
30	L	January 23, 1940	3–5	New York Rangers (1939–40)	9–20–1
31	T	January 25, 1940	2–2 OT	@ Montreal Canadiens (1939–40)	9–20–2
32	L	January 28, 1940	2–4	@ New York Rangers (1939–40)	9–21–2
33	W	January 30, 1940	4–1	Montreal Canadiens (1939–40)	10–21–2

February

Game	Result	Date	Score	Opponent	Record
34	W	February 1, 1940	5–2	Chicago Black Hawks (1939–40)	11–21–2
35	L	February 4, 1940	1–7	@ Boston Bruins (1939–40)	11–22–2
36	L	February 6, 1940	1–3	Detroit Red Wings (1939–40)	11–23–2
37	L	February 8, 1940	2–3	@ Chicago Black Hawks (1939–40)	11–24–2
38	L	February 11, 1940	2–4	Boston Bruins (1939–40)	11–25–2
39	T	February 18, 1940	1–1 OT	Chicago Black Hawks (1939–40)	11–25–3
40	W	February 22, 1940	1–0 OT	New York Rangers (1939–40)	12–25–3
41	L	February 25, 1940	1–4	@ Detroit Red Wings (1939–40)	12–26–3

March

Game	Result	Date	Score	Opponent	Record
42	T	March 2, 1940	3–3 OT	@ Montreal Canadiens (1939–40)	12–26–4
43	W	March 3, 1940	3–0	Montreal Canadiens (1939–40)	13–26–4
44	L	March 7, 1940	1–2	Boston Bruins (1939–40)	13–27–4
45	W	March 9, 1940	4–2	@ Boston Bruins (1939–40)	14–27–4
46	L	March 10, 1940	2–4	@ New York Rangers (1939–40)	14–28–4
47	L	March 16, 1940	6–8	@ Toronto Maple Leafs (1939–40)	14–29–4
48	W	March 17, 1940	5–2	Toronto Maple Leafs (1939–40)	15–29–4

Legend: Win (2 points) Loss (0 points) Tie (1 point)

== Playoffs ==
The Americans met the Detroit in a best-of-three series and lost the series in 2 games, or 1–2.

== Player statistics ==
=== Regular season ===
Scoring

Player	GP	G	A	Pts	PIM
Murray Armstrong	47	16	20	36	12
Tommy Anderson	48	12	19	31	22
Charlie Conacher	47	10	18	28	41
Lorne Carr	48	8	17	25	17
John Sorrell	48	8	16	24	4
Busher Jackson	43	12	8	20	10
Eddie Wiseman	31	5	13	18	8
Hooley Smith	47	7	8	15	41
Buzz Boll	47	5	10	15	18
Nels Stewart	35	6	7	13	6
Art Chapman	26	4	6	10	2
Pat Egan	10	4	3	7	6
Johnny Gagnon	24	4	3	7	0
Eddie Shore	10	2	3	5	9
Allan Murray	36	1	4	5	10
Wilf Field	45	1	3	4	28
Jack Tomson	12	1	1	2	0
Doc Romnes	15	0	1	1	0
Frank Beisler	1	0	0	0	0
Earl Robertson	48	0	0	0	0
Chuck Shannon	4	0	0	0	2

Goaltending

Player	MIN	GP	W	L	T	GA	GAA	SA	SV	SV%	SO
Earl Robertson	2960	48	15	29	4	140	2.84				6
Team:	2960	48	15	29	4	140	2.84				6

=== Playoffs ===
Scoring

Player	GP	G	A	Pts	PIM
Hooley Smith	3	3	1	4	2
Tommy Anderson	3	1	3	4	0
John Sorrell	3	0	3	3	2
Charlie Conacher	3	1	1	2	8
Eddie Shore	3	0	2	2	2
Art Chapman	3	1	0	1	0
Johnny Gagnon	1	1	0	1	0
Busher Jackson	3	0	1	1	2
Murray Armstrong	3	0	0	0	0
Buzz Boll	1	0	0	0	0
Lorne Carr	3	0	0	0	0
Pat Egan	2	0	0	0	4
Allan Murray	3	0	0	0	2
Earl Robertson	3	0	0	0	0
Nels Stewart	3	0	0	0	0

Goaltending

Player	MIN	GP	W	L	T	GA	GAA	SA	SV	SV%	SO
Earl Robertson	180	3	1	2		9	3.00				0
Team:	180	3	1	2		9	3.00				0

== Awards and records ==
No New York Americans players won any awards or were named to the All-Star teams for the 1939-40 NHL season.

== Transactions ==
May 18, 1939	To Toronto Maple Leafs Sweeney Schriner	To New York Americans Murray Armstrong; Buzz Boll; Busher Jackson; Elwyn Romnes
September 22, 1939	To Toronto Maple Leafs future considerations^{1} (cash)	To New York Americans Charlie Conacher
November 7, 1939	To New York Americans cash	To Detroit Red Wings Alfie Moore
January 3, 1940	To New York Americans Johnny Gagnon	To Montreal Canadiens cash
January 25, 1940	To Boston Bruins Ed Wiseman $5,000 cash	To New York Americans Eddie Shore

1. Transaction completed on May 21, 1940.

== See also ==
- 1939–40 NHL season
