= Armand Raymond =

Canadian ice hockey player

- Born: January 12, 1913 Mechanicville, New York, U.S.
- Died: January 22, 1993 (aged 80) Montreal, Quebec, Canada
- Height: 5 ft 10 in (178 cm)
- Weight: 200 lb (91 kg; 14 st 4 lb)
- Position: Defense
- Shot: Left
- Played for: Montreal Canadiens
- Playing career: 1931–1942

Armand Raymond (January 12, 1913 – January 22, 1993) was an American professional ice hockey defenseman who played 22 games in the National Hockey League for the Montreal Canadiens during the 1937–38 and 1939–40 seasons. The rest of his career, which lasted from 1931 to 1942, was spent in the minor leagues.

== Career statistics ==
=== Regular season and playoffs ===
			Regular season					Playoffs
Season	Team	League	GP	G	A	Pts	PIM	GP	G	A	Pts	PIM
1931–32	Montreal St. Francis Xavier	MCJHL	10	0	0	0	8	2	0	0	0	8
1932–33	Montreal St. Francis Xavier	MCJHL	10	1	0	1	15	2	0	0	0	2
1933–34	Montreal St. Francis Xavier	MCJHL	7	1	1	2	20	—	—	—	—	—
1933–34	Montreal St. Francis Xavier	MCHL	13	2	0	2	36	—	—	—	—	—
1935–36	Atlantic City Sea Gulls	EAHL	21	0	4	4	14	8	1	1	2	6
1936–37	Montreal Senior Canadiens	QSHL	21	3	3	6	30	2	0	0	0	4
1937–38	Montreal Canadiens	NHL	11	0	2	2	4	—	—	—	—	—
1937–38	Montreal Concordia Civics	QSHL	21	6	7	13	32	1	0	0	0	2
1938–39	Montreal Concordia Civis	QSHL	—	—	—	—	—	—	—	—	—	—
1939–40	Montreal Canadiens	NHL	11	0	1	1	10	—	—	—	—	—
1939–40	Providence Reds	IAHL	22	0	4	4	14	—	—	—	—	—
1940–41	Saint-Jérôme Papermakers	QPHL	33	18	20	38	86	8	2	5	7	6
1940–41	Saint-Jérôme Papermakers	Al-Cup	—	—	—	—	—	4	0	0	0	0
1941–42	Shawinigan Falls Cataractes	MDHL	28	1	21	22	40	10	1	1	2	12
NHL totals			22	0	3	3	14	—	—	—	—	—
