= Walter Buswell =

Canadian ice hockey player

- Born: November 6, 1907 Montreal, Quebec, Canada
- Died: October 16, 1991 (aged 83) Saint-Eustache, Quebec, Canada
- Height: 5 ft 11 in (180 cm)
- Weight: 170 lb (77 kg; 12 st 2 lb)
- Position: Defence
- Shot: Left
- Played for: Detroit Red Wings; Montreal Canadiens
- Playing career: 1931–1940

Walter Gerard Buswell (November 6, 1907 – October 16, 1991), was a Canadian ice hockey defenceman who played eight seasons in the National Hockey League between 1932 and 1940 for the Detroit Red Wings and Montreal Canadiens.

Complexe Walter-Buswell, a building with two hockey rinks in Saint-Eustache, Quebec, Canada, is named after Buswell.

== Career statistics ==
=== Regular season and playoffs ===
			Regular season					Playoffs
Season	Team	League	GP	G	A	Pts	PIM	GP	G	A	Pts	PIM
1929–30	Montreal CPR	MRTHL	—	—	—	—	—	—	—	—	—	—
1930–31	Montreal St. Francis Xavier	MCHL	—	—	—	—	—	—	—	—	—	—
1931–32	Chicago Shamrocks	AHA	48	9	5	14	39	4	0	1	1	4
1932–33	Detroit Red Wings	NHL	46	2	4	6	16	4	0	0	0	4
1933–34	Detroit Red Wings	NHL	47	1	2	3	8	9	0	1	1	2
1934–35	Detroit Red Wings	NHL	47	1	3	4	32	—	—	—	—	—
1934–35	Detroit Olympics	IHL	2	0	0	0	0	—	—	—	—	—
1935–36	Montreal Canadiens	NHL	44	0	2	2	34	—	—	—	—	—
1936–37	Montreal Canadiens	NHL	44	0	4	4	30	5	0	0	0	2
1937–38	Montreal Canadiens	NHL	48	2	15	17	24	3	0	0	0
1938–39	Montreal Canadiens	NHL	46	3	7	10	10	3	2	0	2	2
1939–40	Montreal Canadiens	NHL	46	1	3	4	10	—	—	—	—	—
1940–41	Joliette Cyclones	QPHL	12	3	5	8	2	3	1	6	7	4
NHL totals			368	10	40	50	164	24	2	1	3	10

Preceded by Albert Babe Siebert	Montreal Canadiens captain 1939–40	Succeeded by Toe Blake
