= Paul Goodman (ice hockey) =

Canadian ice hockey player

- Born: February 25, 1905 Selkirk, Manitoba, Canada
- Died: October 1, 1959 (aged 54)
- Height: 5 ft 10 in (178 cm)
- Weight: 165 lb (75 kg; 11 st 11 lb)
- Position: Goaltender
- Caught: Left
- Played for: Chicago Black Hawks
- Playing career: 1935–1941

Paul William Goodman (February 25, 1905 – October 1, 1959) was a Canadian ice hockey goaltender and politician who played 52 games in the National Hockey League with the Chicago Black Hawks from 1938 to 1941.

== Career ==
During the 1938 Stanley Cup Final, Mike Karakas, the regular Black Hawks goaltender, was injured and unable to play in game one. Chicago used substitution goalie Alfie Moore. The Black Hawks won the game 3–1 over the Toronto Maple Leafs. Toronto then refused to let Moore play the next game, but agreed to allow Goodman to play. Chicago lost 5–1 to Toronto. Karakas returned from injuries to win the next two games. Chicago became the first of only two teams (see 1949 Toronto) to win the Stanley Cup with a losing record. Chicago included Goodman name on the Stanley Cup in 1938 for his efforts.

Goodman was a member of Winnipeg City Council from 1954 to 1959, and unsuccessfully contested the 1958 Manitoba general election as a member of the Manitoba Liberal Party in Winnipeg Centre.

== Career statistics ==
=== Regular season and playoffs ===
			Regular season								Playoffs
Season	Team	League	GP	W	L	T	Min	GA	SO	GAA	GP	W	L	Min	GA	SO	GAA
1931–32	Selkirk Fishermen	MHL	12	—	—	—	720	17	4	1.92	2	—	—	120	3	0	1.50
1931–32	Selkirk Fishermen	Al-Cup	—	—	—	—	—	—	—	—	2	0	2	120	4	0	2.00
1932–33	Selkirk Fishermen	MHL	16	—	—	—	960	26	1	1.63	4	—	—	240	4	1	1.00
1933–34	Selkirk Fishermen	MHL	16	—	—	—	960	30	2	1.88	4	—	—	240	12	0	3.00
1934–35	Selkirk Fishermen	MHL	10	—	—	—	600	29	0	2.90	2	—	—	120	12	0	3.00
1935–36	Wichita Skyhawks	AHA	48	16	32	0	2880	114	7	2.90	—	—	—	—	—	—	—
1936–37	Wichita Skyhawks	AHA	48	18	27	3	2880	87	9	1.77	—	—	—	—	—	—	—
1937–38	Wichita Skyhawks	AHA	47	23	20	4	2820	130	1	2.69	—	—	—	—	—	—	—
1937–38	Chicago Black Hawks	NHL	—	—	—	—	—	—	—	—	1	0	1	60	5	0	5.00
1938–39	Wichita Skyhawks	AHA	45	13	32	0	2737	156	0	3.42	3	0	3	182	19	0	6.26
1939–40	Chicago Black Hawks	NHL	31	16	10	5	1920	62	4	1.94	2	0	2	127	5	0	2.37
1939–40	Providence Reds	IAHL	21	10	9	2	1300	58	2	2.68	—	—	—	—	—	—	—
1940–41	Chicago Black Hawks	NHL	21	7	10	4	1320	55	2	2.50	—	—	—	—	—	—	—
NHL totals			52	23	20	9	3240	117	6	2.17	3	0	3	187	10	0	3.22

== Awards and achievements ==
- Stanley Cup Championship (1938)
- Honoured Member of the Manitoba Hockey Hall of Fame
