= Jack Shewchuk =

Canadian ice hockey player

- Born: June 14, 1917 Brantford, Ontario, Canada
- Died: May 15, 1989 (aged 71)
- Height: 6 ft 1 in (185 cm)
- Weight: 190 lb (86 kg; 13 st 8 lb)
- Position: Defence
- Shot: Left
- Played for: Boston Bruins
- Playing career: 1937–1952

John Michael Shewchuk (June 14, 1917 – May 15, 1989) was a Canadian professional ice hockey defenceman. Shewchuk played in the National Hockey League for the Boston Bruins between 1938 and 1945, playing a total of 187 regular season games and 20 playoff games. He won the Stanley Cup with the Bruins in 1941. The rest of his career, which lasted from 1937 to 1952, was mainly spent in the American Hockey League. He was born in Brantford, Ontario.

== Career statistics ==
=== Regular season and playoffs ===
			Regular season					Playoffs
Season	Team	League	GP	G	A	Pts	PIM	GP	G	A	Pts	PIM
1935–36	Sudbury Cub-Wolves	NOJHA	10	2	0	2	22	—	—	—	—	—
1935–36	Copper Cliff Jr. Redmen	NOJHA	4	6	4	10	6	4	1	0	1	10
1935–36	Sudbury Wolves	M-Cup	—	—	—	—	—	4	1	0	1	10
1936–37	Copper Cliff Jr. Redmen	NOJHA	14	1	3	4	22	—	—	—	—	—
1936–37	Copper Cliff Jr. Redmen	M-Cup	—	—	—	—	—	12	4	3	7	31
1937–38	Providence Reds	IAHL	42	4	3	7	69	7	0	0	0	6
1938–39	Boston Bruins	NHL	3	0	0	0	2	—	—	—	—	—
1938–39	Providence Reds	IAHL	46	8	17	25	72	5	1	1	2	8
1939–40	Boston Bruins	NHL	47	2	4	6	55	6	0	0	0	0
1940–41	Boston Bruins	NHL	20	2	2	4	8	—	—	—	—	—
1940–41	Hershey Bears	AHL	31	1	5	6	22	9	0	0	0	2
1941–42	Boston Bruins	NHL	22	2	0	2	14	5	0	1	1	7
1941–42	Hershey Bears	AHL	34	1	9	10	28	—	—	—	—	—
1942–43	Boston Bruins	NHL	48	2	6	8	50	9	0	0	0	12
1944–45	Boston Bruins	NHL	47	1	7	8	31	—	—	—	—	—
1945–46	Hershey Bears	AHL	55	3	15	18	89	3	0	1	1	2
1946–47	St. Louis Flyers	AHL	51	1	9	10	34	—	—	—	—	—
1947–48	St. Louis Flyers	AHL	65	1	12	13	58	—	—	—	—	—
1948–49	Kitchener-Waterloo Dutchmen	OHA Sr	35	3	11	14	43	12	0	0	0	20
1949–50	Kitchener-Waterloo Dutchmen	OHA Sr	41	7	7	14	69	13	1	2	3	26
1950–51	Kitchener-Waterloo Dutchmen	OHA Sr	3	0	0	0	8	—	—	—	—	—
1951–52	Brantford Redmen	OHA Sr	23	0	1	1	0	—	—	—	—	—
IAHL/AHL totals			324	19	70	89	372	24	1	2	3	18
NHL totals			187	9	19	28	160	20	0	1	1	19
