= Phil Stein =

Canadian ice hockey player

- Born: September 13, 1913; Toronto, Ontario, Canada
- Died: April 4, 1987 (aged 73); Toronto, Ontario, Canada
- Height: 5 ft 11 in (180 cm)
- Position: Goaltender
- Caught: Left
- Played for: Toronto Maple Leafs
- Playing career: 1933–1943

Philip John Stein (September 13, 1913 – April 4, 1987) was a professional ice hockey goaltender who played in one National Hockey League game for the Toronto Maple Leafs during the 1939–40 season, on January 18, 1940 against the Detroit Red Wings. The rest of his career, which lasted from 1933 to 1943, was spent in various minor leagues.

== Career statistics ==
=== Regular season and playoffs ===
			Regular season								Playoffs
Season	Team	League	GP	W	L	T	Min	GA	SO	GAA	GP	W	L	T	Min	GA	SO	GAA
1930–31	Toronto Marlboros	OHA	7	—	—	—	420	18	0	2.57	2	—	—	—	120	5	0	2.50
1931–32	Toronto Marlboros	OHA	8	—	—	—	460	15	0	1.96	4	—	—	—	240	4	1	1.00
1932–33	Toronto Marlboros	OHA	9	—	—	—	540	6	2	1.56	3	—	—	—	180	6	1	2.00
1933–34	Syracuse Stars	IHL	23	—	—	—	1380	51	3	2.22	2	—	—	—	120	4	0	2.00
1933–34	Toronto Red Indians	TMHL	15	3	11	1	920	68	0	4.34	—	—	—	—	—	—	—	—
1934–35	Syracuse Stars	IHL	36	15	17	4	2220	97	2	2.62	2	0	2	0	120	7	0	3.50
1935–36	Syracuse Stars	IHL	40	22	15	3	2480	105	3	2.54	3	0	3	0	180	8	0	2.67
1936–37	Syracuse Stars	IAHL	50	29	16	5	3080	135	2	2.63	9	6	3	0	540	15	2	1.66
1937–38	Syracuse Stars	IAHL	48	21	20	7	2970	122	3	2.46	8	5	3	0	612	23	0	2.25
1938–39	Syracuse Stars	IAHL	49	23	18	8	3030	109	6	2.16	3	1	2	0	180	6	0	2.00
1939–40	Toronto Maple Leafs	NHL	1	0	0	1	70	2	0	1.71	—	—	—	—	—	—	—	—
1939–40	Providence Reds	IAHL	19	10	5	4	1190	56	1	2.82	—	—	—	—	—	—	—	—
1939–40	Omaha Knights	AHA	6	3	3	0	360	16	0	2.67	—	—	—	—	—	—	—	—
1940–41	New Haven Eagles	AHL	53	26	21	6	3270	142	4	2.61	2	0	2	0	130	3	0	1.38
1941–42	New Haven Eagles	AHL	54	26	24	4	3330	204	2	3.68	2	0	2	0	120	4	0	2.00
1942–43	Toronto Colonels	TIHL	8	2	6	0	490	57	0	6.98	—	—	—	—	—	—	—	—
1942–43	Toronto Staffords	TMHL	7	4	2	1	420	19	0	2.71	5	0	4	1	320	22	0	4.13
NHL totals			1	0	0	1	7	2	0	1.71	—	—	—	—	—	—	—	—

== See also ==
- List of players who played only one game in the NHL
