= John Polich =

American ice hockey player (1915–2001)

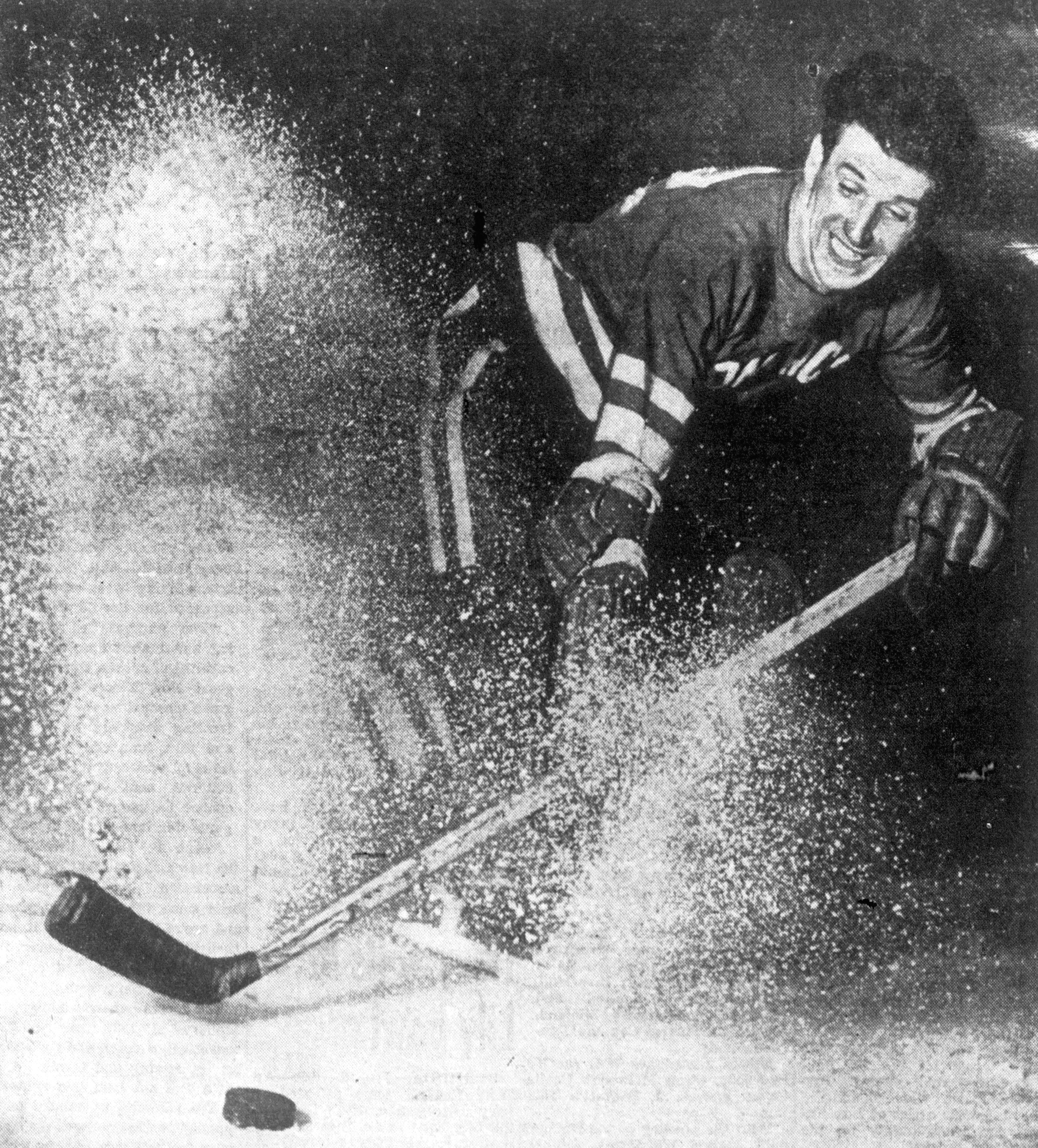
- Polich with the Los Angeles Monarchs, circa 1943
- Born: July 8, 1915 Hibbing, Minnesota, United States
- Died: May 27, 2001 (aged 85)
- Height: 6 ft 2 in (188 cm)
- Weight: 200 lb (91 kg; 14 st 4 lb)
- Position: Right wing
- Shot: Right
- Played for: New York Rangers
- Playing career: 1939–1948

John Paul Polich (July 8, 1915 – May 27, 2001) was an American professional ice hockey player who played in the National Hockey League with the New York Rangers during the 1939–40 and 1940–41 seasons. The rest of his career, which lasted from 1939 to 1948, was spent in the minor leagues.

Polich also played American football at the minor league level. He appeared in games for the Hollywood Rangers during the 1944 season.

== Career statistics ==
=== Regular season and playoffs ===
			Regular season					Playoffs
Season	Team	League	GP	G	A	Pts	PIM	GP	G	A	Pts	PIM
1934–35	Hibbing High School	HS-MN	—	—	—	—	—	—	—	—	—	—
1935–36	Loyola College	SCSHL	—	—	—	—	—	—	—	—	—	—
1936–37	Loyola College	SCSHL	—	—	—	—	—	—	—	—	—	—
1937–38	Loyola College	SCSHL	—	—	—	—	—	—	—	—	—	—
1939–40	New York Rangers	NHL	1	0	0	0	0	—	—	—	—	—
1939–40	Philadelphia Ramblers	IAHL	53	11	22	33	56	—	—	—	—	—
1940–41	New York Rangers	NHL	2	0	1	1	0	—	—	—	—	—
1940–41	Philadelphia Ramblers	AHL	50	10	31	41	53	—	—	—	—	—
1942–43	Los Angeles Monarchs	SCSHL	—	—	—	—	—	—	—	—	—	—
1943–44	Los Angeles Monarchs	SCSHL	—	—	—	—	—	—	—	—	—	—
1944–45	Los Angeles Monarchs	PCHL	18	10	18	28	0	—	—	—	—	—
1945–46	Los Angeles Monarchs	PCHL	34	11	14	25	86	7	2	1	3	14
1946–47	Los Angeles Monarchs	PCHL	50	25	37	62	37	10	6	5	11	9
1947–48	Los Angeles Monarchs	PCHL	53	17	30	47	59	4	3	0	3	6
PCHL totals			155	63	99	162	182	21	11	6	17	29
NHL totals			3	0	1	1	0	—	—	—	—	—
