= Joe Fisher (ice hockey) =

Canadian ice hockey player

- Born: July 4, 1916 Medicine Hat, Alberta, Canada
- Died: April 13, 2002 (aged 85)
- Height: 6 ft 0 in (183 cm)
- Weight: 175 lb (79 kg; 12 st 7 lb)
- Position: Right wing
- Shot: Right
- Played for: Detroit Red Wings
- Playing career: 1934–1949

Joseph Henry Fisher (July 4, 1916 – April 13, 2002) was a Canadian professional ice hockey player.

== Early life ==
Fisher was born in Medicine Hat, Alberta.

== Career ==
Fisher played 64 games in the National Hockey League with the Detroit Red Wings between 1939 and 1943. The rest of his career, which lasted from 1934 to 1949, was spent in the minor leagues.

== Career statistics ==
=== Regular season and playoffs ===
			Regular season					Playoffs
Season	Team	League	GP	G	A	Pts	PIM	GP	G	A	Pts	PIM
1934–35	Edmonton Athletic Club	AAHA	9	0	3	3	7	—	—	—	—	—
1935–36	Coleman Canadians	CnSHL	—	—	—	—	—	10	11	6	17	7
1935–36	Hamilton Tigers	Al-Cup	—	—	—	—	—	5	1	2	3	3
1936–37	Coleman Canadians	Exhib	5	5	3	8	—	—	—	—	—	—
1936–37	Coleman Canadians	CnSHL	11	11	12	23	6	—	—	—	—	—
1936–37	Coleman Canadians	Al-Cup	—	—	—	—	—	5	1	0	1	0
1937–38	Kirkland Lake Hargreaves	NOHA	9	3	14	17	6	2	4	0	4	0
1938–39	Pittsburgh Hornets	IAHL	48	9	22	31	17	—	—	—	—	—
1939–40	Detroit Red Wings	NHL	32	2	4	6	2	5	1	1	2	0
1939–40	Indianapolis Capitals	IAHL	17	7	16	23	9	—	—	—	—	—
1940–41	Detroit Red Wings	NHL	28	5	8	13	11	5	1	0	1	6
1940–41	Indianapolis Capitals	AHL	24	8	12	20	7	—	—	—	—	—
1941–42	Detroit Red Wings	NHL	3	0	0	0	0	—	—	—	—	—
1941–42	Indianapolis Capitals	AHL	41	21	18	39	15	10	4	4	8	2
1942–43	Detroit Red Wings	NHL	1	1	0	1	0	—	—	—	—	—
1942–43	Indianapolis Capitals	AHL	56	24	37	61	9	7	2	5	7	0
1944–45	Winnipeg RCAF	WNDHL	4	3	2	5	0	3	2	2	4	5
1945–46	Calgary Stampeders	WCSHL	12	12	4	16	0	5	2	3	5	2
1945–46	Calgary Stampeders	Al-Cup	—	—	—	—	—	13	9	13	22	6
1946–47	Lethbridge Maple Leafs	WCSHL	35	15	44	59	22	7	4	3	7	12
1946–47	Calgary Stampeders	Al-Cup	—	—	—	—	—	11	3	2	5	8
1947–48	Regina Capitals	WCSHL	32	17	24	41	2	1	2	0	2	0
1948–49	Regina Capitals	WCSHL	1	0	0	0	0	7	2	6	8	2
1948–49	Regina Capitals	Al-Cup	—	—	—	—	—	5	2	1	3	12
NHL totals			64	8	12	20	13	10	2	1	3	6
