= Connie Brown =

Canadian ice hockey player

- Born: January 11, 1917; Vankleek Hill, Ontario, Canada
- Died: June 3, 1996 (aged 79)
- Height: 5 ft 7 in (170 cm)
- Weight: 168 lb (76 kg; 12 st 0 lb)
- Position: Centre
- Shot: Left
- Played for: Detroit Red Wings
- Playing career: 1935–1952

Patrick Conway Brown (January 11, 1917 — June 3, 1996) was a Canadian ice hockey player who played 93 games in the National Hockey League with the Detroit Red Wings between 1939 and 1943. The rest of his career, which lasted from 1935 to 1952, was spent in various minor and senior leagues. He was born in Vankleek Hill, Ontario.

== Career statistics ==
=== Regular season and playoffs ===
			Regular season					Playoffs
Season	Team	League	GP	G	A	Pts	PIM	GP	G	A	Pts	PIM
1933–34	Ottawa St. Malachy's	OCJHL	16	11	9	20	17	—	—	—	—	—
1934–35	Ottawa Junior Rideaus	OCJHL	12	11	23	34	8	5	5	1	6	2
1934–35	Ottawa Rideaus	OCSHL	1	1	0	1	0	—	—	—	—	—
1934–35	Ottawa Rideaus	M-Cup	—	—	—	—	—	8	10	9	19	0
1935–36	Ottawa Senators	OCHL	19	3	7	10	8	4	1	1	2	2
1936–37	Cornwall Flyers	OCHL	23	16	12	28	21	6	0	2	2	4
1937–38	Cornwall Flyers	OCHL	24	14	36	50	14	6	6	5	11	0
1937–38	Cornwall Flyers	Al-Cup	—	—	—	—	—	11	6	8	14	8
1938–39	Detroit Red Wings	NHL	2	1	0	1	0	—	—	—	—	—
1938–39	Pittsburgh Hornets	IAHL	53	11	34	45	38	—	—	—	—	—
1939–40	Detroit Red Wings	NHL	36	8	3	11	2	5	2	1	3	0
1939–40	Indianapolis Capitals	IAHL	15	9	10	19	11	—	—	—	—	—
1940–41	Detroit Red Wings	NHL	3	1	2	3	0	9	0	2	2	0
1940–41	Indianapolis Capitals	AHL	50	16	28	44	17	—	—	—	—	—
1941–42	Detroit Red Wings	NHL	9	0	3	3	4	—	—	—	—	—
1941–42	Indianapolis Capitals	AHL	44	19	34	53	19	10	6	5	11	5
1942–43	Detroit Red Wings	NHL	23	5	16	21	6	—	—	—	—	—
1942–43	Indianapolis Capitals	AHL	38	12	25	37	6	7	2	6	8	2
1943–44	Petawawa Grenades	OVHL	1	0	4	4	0	—	—	—	—	—
1944–45	Ottawa Engineers	OCHL	—	—	—	—	—	3	2	2	4	4
1945–46	Ottawa Senators	QSHL	36	12	39	51	16	9	5	5	10	10
1945–46	Ottawa Quarter-Masters	OCHL	—	8	20	28	—	4	8	8	16	—
1946–47	Ottawa Senators	QSHL	18	7	11	18	8	8	1	2	3	4
1947–48	Valleyfield Braves	QSHL	40	20	36	56	34	6	4	2	6	2
1948–49	Valleyfield Braves	QSHL	63	41	47	88	22	4	0	2	2	0
1949–50	Glace Bay Miners	CBSHL	70	31	47	78	38	10	6	13	19	0
1950–51	Ottawa Army	ECSHL	37	20	28	48	16	3	5	2	7	2
1951–52	Hull Volants	ECSHL	29	9	21	30	0	5	0	10	10	0
IAHL/AHL totals			198	67	131	198	91	17	8	11	19	7
NHL totals			73	15	24	39	12	14	2	3	5	0
