= Charles Shannon (ice hockey) =

Canadian ice hockey player

- Born: March 22, 1916; Campbellford, Ontario, Canada
- Died: August 25, 1974 (aged 58)
- Height: 5 ft 11 in (180 cm)
- Weight: 192 lb (87 kg; 13 st 10 lb)
- Position: Defence
- Shot: Left
- Played for: Montreal Maroons; New York Americans
- Playing career: 1935–1947

Charles Kitchener Shannon (March 22, 1916 — August 25, 1974) was a professional ice hockey player who played 4 games in the National Hockey League for the New York Americans during the 1939–40 season. The rest of his career, which lasted from 1933 to 1948, was spent in various minor leagues.

== Biography ==
His family moved to Niagara Falls in 1918. Shannon's hockey career spanned 28 years, beginning in 1933 through to the late 1950s.

He began playing Junior Hockey for the Niagara Falls Kiwanis from 1932 to 1933, moving to the Sudbury Wolves until 1935. From the Wolves he went to the Memorial Cup in Winnipeg and that same year, signed a three-year contract with the Toronto Maple Leafs.

His career followed with the Syracuse Stars, Springfield Indians, Pittsburgh Hornets and Buffalo Bisons, all of the American Hockey League. He also played four games for the New York Americans of the National Hockey League.

In 1946 and 1947, Shannon became a playing coach with the Owen Sound Mercuries Senior "A" club and then with the Orangeville Senior "B" Team.

From 1950 to 1952, Shannon coached the first Niagara Falls Cataracts Senior Team to ever play in the O.H.A. Semi-Finals. Shannon also coached the 1955-56 Niagara Falls Senior "A" Team and in the late 1950s, the Stamford Kerrio's Senior "B" Team.

Shannon acquired some nicknames, given by his teammates, fans, and press. "Specs Shannon", given because he was the first NHL hockey player to successfully wear glasses while playing hockey.

It took almost thirty years before the next Niagara Falls hockey player, Derek Sanderson, made it to the NHL. Shannon coached local minor hockey in Niagara Falls, Ontario, following his retirement from playing.

== Career statistics ==
=== Regular season and playoffs ===
			Regular season					Playoffs
Season	Team	League	GP	G	A	Pts	PIM	GP	G	A	Pts	PIM
1931–32	Niagara Falls Cataracts	OHA	6	6	2	8	6	5	1	2	3	0
1932–33	Niagara Falls Cataracts	OHA	6	6	2	8	6	2	2	2	4	4
1932–33	Niagara Falls Cataracts	M-Cup	—	—	—	—	—	3	1	1	2	4
1933–34	Sudbury Cubs	NOHA	8	9	6	15	12	2	3	1	4	0
1934–35	Sudbury Cubs	NOHA	10	19	5	24	10	5	5	4	9	4
1935–36	Syracuse Stars	IHL	46	10	14	24	16	3	0	0	0	0
1936–37	Syracuse Stars	IHL	50	6	19	25	40	9	2	2	4	0
1937–38	Syracuse Stars	IAHL	43	6	20	26	33	8	0	4	4	4
1938–39	Springfield Indians	IAHL	1	0	0	0	0	—	—	—	—	—
1938–39	Syracuse Stars	IAHL	19	0	9	9	12	3	0	1	1	0
1939–40	New York Americans	NHL	4	0	0	0	2	—	—	—	—	—
1939–40	Kansas City Greyhounds	AHA	24	5	7	12	8	—	—	—	—	—
1939–40	Springfield Indians	IAHL	19	2	4	6	17	—	—	—	—	—
1940–41	Buffalo Bisons	AHL	53	10	24	34	42	—	—	—	—	—
1941–42	Buffalo Bisons	AHL	55	6	13	19	32	—	—	—	—	—
1942–43	Pittsburgh Hornets	AHL	50	8	12	20	36	2	0	2	2	4
1943–44	Pittsburgh Hornets	AHL	42	3	12	15	4	—	—	—	—	—
1943–44	Providence Reds	AHL	1	0	0	0	0	—	—	—	—	—
1944–45	Pittsburgh Hornets	AHL	23	1	4	5	10	—	—	—	—	—
1944–45	Toronto Army Shamrocks	TIHL	11	2	6	8	4	2	0	1	1	0
1944–45	Newmarket Army	TNDHL	—	—	—	—	—	5	3	5	8	12
1944–45	Toronto Army Daggers	TNDHL	—	—	—	—	—	1	2	0	2	4
1945–46	Toronto Staffords	OHA Sr	16	4	9	13	20	10	0	2	2	8
1946–47	Owen Sound Mohawks	OHA Sr	22	3	10	13	12	9	2	1	3	14
1947–48	Hamilton Patricias	OHA Sr	13	1	5	6	2	2	0	1	1	2
IAHL/AHL totals			356	42	117	159	226	22	2	9	11	8
NHL totals			4	0	0	0	2	—	—	—	—	—
