= Kilby MacDonald =

Canadian ice hockey player

- Born: September 6, 1913 Ottawa, Ontario, Canada
- Died: May 11, 1986 (aged 72) Seminole, Florida, USA
- Height: 5 ft 11 in (180 cm)
- Weight: 178 lb (81 kg; 12 st 10 lb)
- Position: Left wing
- Shot: Left
- Played for: New York Rangers
- Playing career: 1940–1946

James Allan Kilby Macdonald (September 6, 1913 – May 11, 1986) was a Canadian professional ice hockey left winger who played four seasons in the National Hockey League for the New York Rangers.

== Playing career ==
MacDonald started his hockey career with the Ottawa Jr. Montagnards of the OCJHL IN 1930-31. In 1934-35, he moved to the GBHL and played with the Kirkland Lake Blue Devils. The next season, MacDonald played with the Noranda Copper Kings and he helped the team make it to the Allan Cup. MacDonald spent the next three years with the New York Rovers in the Eastern Amateur Hockey League and the Philadelphia Ramblers of the International-American Hockey League. He was chosen to the EAHL First All-Star Team in 1936-37 and in 1938-39 MacDonald was selected to the IAHL First All-Star Team.

In 1939-40, MacDonald finally made it to the National Hockey League as he was signed by the New York Rangers. He helped the Rangers win the Stanley Cup that year and was also awarded the Calder Memorial Trophy for best rookie of the year. In 1941-42, MacDonald was sent down to the American Hockey League with the Hershey Bears. He played in 37 before being traded to the Buffalo Bisons.

In 1942-43, MacDonald joined the army. He played hockey while in the army with the Montreal Army. MacDonald returned to the NHL in 1943-44 with the New York Rangers. He would remain with the Rangers until 1944-45. MacDonald went on to play in the Quebec Senior Hockey League in 1945-46 with the Hull Volants. MacDonald would play in 9 games with the team before retiring.

== Awards and achievements ==
- Selected to the EAHL First All-Star Team in 1937.
- Selected to the IAHL First All-Star Team in 1939.
- Stanley Cup champion in 1940.
- Calder Memorial Trophy winner in 1940.

== Career statistics ==
			Regular season					Playoffs
Season	Team	League	GP	G	A	Pts	PIM	GP	G	A	Pts	PIM
1930–31	Ottawa Jr. Montagnards	OCJHL	15	2	0	2	14	—	—	—	—	—
1930–31	Ottawa Montagnards	OCHL	4	0	0	0	2	—	—	—	—	—
1931–32	Ottawa Jr. Montagnards	OCJHL	12	10	7	17	21	2	1	0	1	4
1931–32	Ottawa Montagnards	OCHL	1	0	0	0	0	—	—	—	—	—
1932–33	Ottawa Jr. Montagnards	OCJHL	12	7	7	14	20	2	1	1	2	12
1932–33	Ottawa Montagnards	OCHL	1	0	0	0	0	—	—	—	—	—
1934–35	Kirkland Lake Blue Devils	GBHL	13	7	8	15	20	—	—	—	—	—
1935–36	Noranda Copper Kings	GBHL	16	14	10	24	48	—	—	—	—	—
1935–36	Noranda Copper Kings	Al-Cup	—	—	—	—	—	2	4	1	5	4
1936–37	New York Rovers	EAHL	45	21	22	43	24	3	3	3	6	0
1937–38	Philadelphia Ramblers	IAHL	44	10	21	31	12	5	2	3	5	2
1938–39	Philadelphia Ramblers	IAHL	49	18	37	55	48	9	4	4	8	0
1939–40	New York Rangers	NHL	44	15	13	28	19	12	2	0	2	2
1940–41	New York Rangers	NHL	47	5	6	11	12	3	1	0	1	0
1941–42	Hershey Bears	AHL	37	14	16	30	16	—	—	—	—	—
1941–42	Buffalo Bisons	AHL	21	14	14	28	12	—	—	—	—	—
1942–43	Montreal Army	MCHL	32	12	23	35	10	12	9	12	21	24
1943–44	Montreal Army	MCHL	4	0	0	0	0	—	—	—	—	—
1943–44	New York Rangers	NHL	24	7	9	16	4	—	—	—	—	—
1944–45	New York Rangers	NHL	36	9	6	15	12	—	—	—	—	—
1945–46	Hull Volants	QSHL	9	2	4	6	0	—	—	—	—	—
NHL totals			151	36	34	70	47	15	1	2	3	4

Preceded by Frank Brimsek	Winner of the Calder Memorial Trophy; 1940	Succeeded by Johnny Quilty
