= Jack Church =

Canadian ice hockey player

- Born: May 24, 1915 Kamsack, Saskatchewan, Canada
- Died: January 5, 1996 (aged 80)
- Height: 5 ft 11 in (180 cm)
- Weight: 181 lb (82 kg; 12 st 13 lb)
- Position: Defence
- Played for: Boston Bruins; Brooklyn Americans; Toronto Maple Leafs
- Playing career: 1936–1942; 1945–1948

John Herbert Church (May 24, 1915 – January 5, 1996) was a Canadian ice hockey defenceman who played 130 games in the National Hockey League for the Toronto Maple Leafs, Boston Bruins, and Brooklyn Americans between 1938 and 1946. He was born in Kamsack, Saskatchewan.

Church scored two goals in his lone season with the Boston Bruins, both against his former team, the Toronto Maple Leafs.

== Career statistics ==
=== Regular season and playoffs ===
			Regular season					Playoffs
Season	Team	League	GP	G	A	Pts	PIM	GP	G	A	Pts	PIM
1932–33	Regina Maple Leafs	S-SJHL	3	0	0	0	10	2	0	0	0	8
1933–34	Regina Maple Leafs	S-SJHL	3	0	0	0	10	2	0	0	0	10
1933–34	Regina Victorias	S-SSHL	16	0	1	1	42	1	0	0	0	6
1934–35	Toronto Dominion Bank	TIHL	16	2	2	4	73	3	0	1	1	8
1935–36	Toronto Dominion Bank	TIHL	16	0	12	12	78	—	—	—	—	—
1935–36	Toronto Dukes	TIHL	16	3	1	4	70	3	1	0	1	12
1936–37	Syracuse Stars	IAHL	50	2	4	6	93	9	1	0	1	10
1937–38	Syracuse Stars	IAHL	43	3	2	5	47	8	0	0	0	8
1938–39	Toronto Maple Leafs	NHL	3	0	2	2	2	1	0	0	0	0
1938–39	Syracuse Stars	IAHL	52	3	12	15	45	3	0	0	0	5
1939–40	Toronto Maple Leafs	NHL	31	1	4	5	62	10	1	1	2	6
1940–41	Toronto Maple Leafs	NHL	11	0	1	1	22	5	0	0	0	8
1941–42	Toronto Maple Leafs	NHL	27	0	3	3	30	—	—	—	—	—
1941–42	Brooklyn Americans	NHL	15	1	3	4	10	—	—	—	—	—
1942–42	Cornwall Army	OHA Sr	33	6	12	18	102	6	1	2	3	10
1945–46	Boston Bruins	NHL	43	2	6	8	28	9	0	0	0	4
1946–47	New Haven Ramblers	AHL	64	7	11	18	83	3	0	0	0	2
1947–48	Providence Reds	AHL	64	1	17	18	67	5	0	2	2	6
IAHL/AHL totals			273	16	46	62	335	28	1	2	3	31
NHL totals			130	4	19	23	154	25	1	1	2	18
