= Herb Cain =

Canadian ice hockey player (1912–1982)

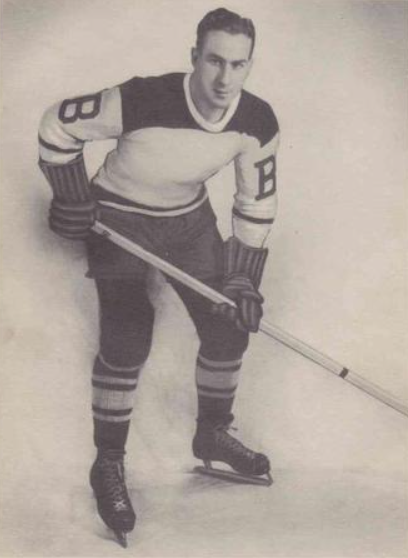
- Cain with the Boston Bruins in 1939
- Born: December 24, 1912 Newmarket, Ontario, Canada
- Died: February 23, 1982 (aged 69) Newmarket, Ontario, Canada
- Height: 5 ft 11 in (180 cm)
- Weight: 165 lb (75 kg; 11 st 11 lb)
- Position: Left wing
- Shot: Left
- Played for: Montreal Maroons; Montreal Canadiens; Boston Bruins
- Playing career: 1933–1950

Herbert James Cain (December 24, 1912 – February 23, 1982) was a Canadian professional ice hockey left winger who played 13 seasons in the National Hockey League (NHL) for the Montreal Maroons, Montreal Canadiens, and Boston Bruins between 1933 and 1946. Honing his skills from a young age, Cain made the NHL midway through the 1933–34 season at the age of 21 and soon became part of a formidable line for the Maroons. In his first full season with the team in 1934, he recorded 20 goals in 44 games as the team won the Stanley Cup. When the team folded in 1938, he was dealt to the Canadiens and played one season before a holdout saw him traded to Boston. He had a 20-goal season in his first season with the team as the Bruins went all the way to the Stanley Cup, with Cain winning his second Cup as a player. In the 1943–44 season, he recorded career highs in goals and assists for a league-leading total of 82 points. He had a second straight 30-goal season the following year before recording 29 points in 48 games of what became his final NHL season in the 1945–46 campaign. He was sent to the American Hockey League with the Hershey Bears, where he claimed that he was blackballed by Bruins owner Art Ross due to wanting a raise. He played four seasons and won the Calder Cup before electing to retire at the age of 37. One of fifteen players with 200 goals at the time of his last NHL game, Cain is currently the only player to have led the league in points scored for a season to not be inducted into the Hockey Hall of Fame.

== Early life ==
Cain in early photo

Cain was born in Newmarket, Ontario to John (Jack) and Elizabeth "Eliza" Cain (née Currier). He started to develop his skills on "the pond" now known as Fairy Lake, with Liberty magazines for shin guards. One year his team from St John's Separate School counted 56 goals. Cain netted every one of them.

He played Junior A hockey in Newmarket and Hamilton. Cain's future as an NHL great was foreshadowed in 1931 playing for the Newmarket Redmen. Just turned 20, he scored 11 goals in six playoff games.

== Early playing career ==
Cain launched his National Hockey League (NHL) career with the Montreal Maroons for part of the 1933–34 season. Boston sportswriter Bill Grimes claimed that a Maroons scout had gone to Windsor to evaluate the play of Toe Blake, but he picked Cain over Blake, who remained a life-long friend of Cain. Another version from Cain's family is that the scout picked both of them.

As a member of the Maroons, Cain played on a line with Gus Marker and Bob Gracie. They were dubbed the "Green Line" and their combined offensive skills led to the teams' second Stanley Cup Championship in 1934–35. In his first full season, as a 22-year-old NHL rookie, Cain scored a team-leading 20 goals in 44 games. This placed him eighth in NHL goal scoring for 1934-35—as a rookie.

After the Montreal Maroons folded during the Great Depression, Cain was dealt to the Montreal Canadiens in the fall of 1938. In his one season with the Habs, or the "French" as some Boston sportswriters called them, Cain stood second in goal scoring (13) behind Toe Blake (24). This was before Montreal became a powerhouse and in 1938–39, they finished sixth of seven teams in season play. Montreal notching only 39 points that year against Boston's 74; eventually Boston won the Stanley Cup.

== Boston Bruins ==
At the beginning of the 1939–40 season, Cain was a holdout in the Montreal Canadiens' training camp, bargaining for a better salary. Montreal traded him to the Boston Bruins for Charlie Sands and Ray Getliffe. Cain played his first game for the Bruins, their season opener, in Toronto on November 4, before practising with his new team. The Bruins lost 5-0 but went on to finish first in the league on the season. That year Milt Schmidt and Woody Dumart led the Bruins goal scoring with 22 goals each, with Cain in third with 21, tied with Bobby Bauer. Cain had seven game winners, and his 21 total goals tied him with Hall of Famer Gordie Drillon for fourth place in goal scoring in the entire league. Only five NHL players scored 20 goals or more, with four of them on the Bruins.

With the Second World War continuing into 1941, Canadian authorities threatened to prohibit single men between the ages of 21 and 25 from working in the United States; nearly all hockey players in the U.S. were Canadian. Cain turned 29 in 1941 and he was married so he was free to make his living in the U.S. but the younger Schmidt and Dumart enlisted with the Royal Canadian Air Force, potentially breaking up the Bruins' famous Kraut line of Schmidt, Dumart and Bauer. These three had finished one-two-three in NHL scoring in 1939–40: Schmidt with 52 points and Bauer and Dumart tied with 43 points. In spite of their initial military call-up, the Krauts played the entire 1940–41 season. Cain was injured, missed nine games and finished the 1940–41 season with just eight goals and ten assists. In the playoffs, however, with two goals and three assists, he was sixth in Bruin scoring and helped to win the Stanley Cup in 1941.

In 1941–42, Cain again notched eight goals and ten assists when he missed 15 games due to injuries. In 1942, more hockey players were joining the war effort. In all ten eventual Hall of Fame forwards from Herb Cain's era, served in World War II. Boston lost its entire first line when the Krauts enlisted. On February 10, 1942, Montreal Canadiens and Boston players, archenemies during the match, hoisted the Krauts to their shoulders and skated them around the Boston Garden to honour their patriotic duty, which in large part meant being physical education instructors and playing hockey for military teams.

With the Kraut Line out of the NHL, left-winger Herb Cain, centre Bill Cowley and various right wingers, including Art Jackson, became Boston's first line. In 1942–43, Cain missed five games due to injuries but managed to score 18 goals and add 18 assists. Cain finished fifth in Bruins goal scoring, well behind Cowley's 27 markers, and was 22nd in the league. In the playoffs, Cain was second in Boston scoring with four goals in seven games, behind Jackson's who had six goals in nine games.

== NHL scoring championship ==
In 1943–44, Cain had the most productive year of his hockey career, again playing on a line with Bill Cowley and often with Art Jackson. Occasionally Cain played on a line with right-winger Buzz Boll, who said of him, "He's so fast that he beats me to all of those loose pucks in front of the cage." Cain won the NHL scoring title with 82 points in 49 games, thereby setting a record for points in a season. This nine more points than the previous record held by Doug Bentley (1943) and Cooney Weiland (1930). In 1944 Cain was also selected as a Second Team All-Star at left wing, and with only four minutes in penalties he was runner up to Clint Smith of the Chicago Black Hawks, who also served four minutes in penalties, for the Lady Byng Trophy. Cain's scoring record of 82 points stood until Gordie Howe scored 86 in 1950–51. Howe set the new record—of just four more points—in a 70-game season—21 more games than Cain played in 1943–44. In the pre-expansion era prior to the 1966–67 season, no player matched Cain in 82 points in a 49 game span.

The following year saw him fall to 13th place while being second in goals to Maurice Richard, who blasted 50. In the playoffs in 1945, Cain led his team in scoring with five goals and two assists in seven games. The next season, 1945–46, Cain's scoring dipped to 17 goals, and 12 assists, still placing him 18th in goal scoring. In 1945–46, the NHL had implemented a one assist rule and although it was not always followed assiduously, assists were down 30% in the league over the previous year. This might account in part for Cain's low assist total although throughout his 13-year NHL career, he counted more goals than assists four times.

On January 6 of the 1945–46 season, he scored his 200th career goal. At the end of the season, he was one of only 15 players with 200 career goals. He finished with 16 goals in the Stanley Cup playoffs, a mark achieved by only 13 other players at the time (fourteen of them were for Boston, which was a franchise record).

== AHL play ==
In 1946, Cain was sent to the Hershey Bears of the American Hockey League (AHL). In four seasons, he scored 92 goals, and helped the Bears win their first Calder Cup. Near the end of his fourth season he had a serious injury, and driving home to Newmarket from Pennsylvania at the end of the season with his leg in a cast, he decided to retire from professional hockey at age 37.

Cain claimed he was blackballed by Art Ross, the fiery manager of the Bruins, because he asked for a raise. In Brian McFarlane's book, The Bruins, Cain is quoted as saying that in 1946 the New York Rangers and the Chicago Black Hawks had been eager to acquire his services. Cain's daughter Colleen corroborates McFarlane's reporting.

== Hockey Hall of Fame ==
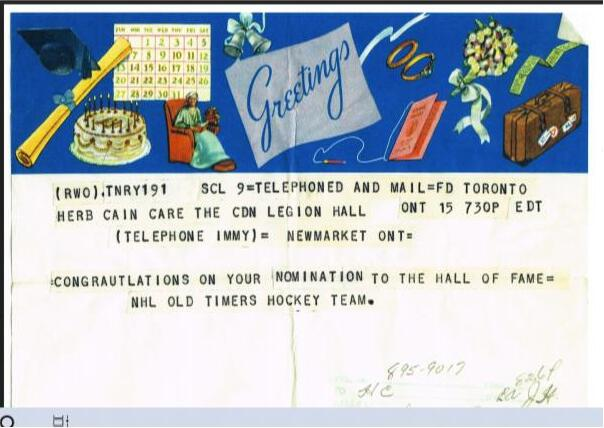
Telegram to Herb Cain informing him of his nomination to the Hockey Hall of Fame

When a benefit was held to raise money for his cancer treatment in the 1960s, members of the NHL hockey squad sent Cain a telegram indicating that he had been nominated to the Hockey Hall of Fame. To date, Herb Cain remains the only NHL scoring champion who is not in the Hockey Hall of Fame.

== Personal life ==
Cain devoted himself to Newmarket, his wife Shirley and their children, Terry and Colleen, who claims she was skating at two. Herb coached the Junior C team, the Newmarket Smokies and they won the Ontario championship in 1956, 1958 and 1959.

In 1964 when Cain was diagnosed with Hodgkin's lymphoma, doctors at Toronto's Princess Margaret Hospital prescribed chemotherapy. He was expected to die but lived another 17 years.

== Awards and achievements ==
- Stanley Cup champion (1935, 1941)
- 1943–44 NHL Scoring leader
- 1943–44 NHL Second Team All-Star - Left Wing
- Named one of the top 100 Bruins players of all time.

== Records ==
1943–44 - Set NHL record for most points in a season with 82

== Career statistics ==
			Regular season					Playoffs
Season	Team	League	GP	G	A	Pts	PIM	GP	G	A	Pts	PIM
1931–32	Newmarket Redmen	OHA-Jr.	7	7	2	9	6	6	11	0	11	—
1932–33	Hamilton Tigers	OHA-Sr.	22	14	5	19	20	5	3	3	6	2
1933–34	Montreal Maroons	NHL	30	4	5	9	14	4	0	0	0	0
1933–34	Hamilton Tigers	OHA-Sr.	11	4	2	6	17	—	—	—	—	—
1934–35	Montreal Maroons	NHL	44	20	7	27	13	7	1	0	1	2
1934–35	Windsor Bulldogs	IHL	6	1	3	4	6	—	—	—	—	—
1935–36	Montreal Maroons	NHL	48	5	13	18	16	3	0	1	1	0
1936–37	Montreal Maroons	NHL	42	13	17	30	18	5	1	1	2	0
1937–38	Montreal Maroons	NHL	47	11	19	30	10	—	—	—	—	—
1938–39	Montreal Canadiens	NHL	45	13	14	27	26	3	0	0	0	2
1939–40	Boston Bruins	NHL	48	21	10	31	30	6	1	3	4	2
1940–41	Boston Bruins	NHL	41	8	10	18	6	11	3	2	5	5
1940–41	Hershey Bears	AHL	1	1	0	1	0	—	—	—	—	—
1941–42	Boston Bruins	NHL	35	8	10	18	2	5	1	0	1	0
1942–43	Boston Bruins	NHL	45	18	18	36	19	7	4	2	6	0
1943–44	Boston Bruins	NHL	49	36	46	82	4	—	—	—	—	—
1944–45	Boston Bruins	NHL	50	32	13	45	16	7	5	2	7	0
1945–46	Boston Bruins	NHL	48	17	12	29	4	9	0	2	2	2
1946–47	Hershey Bears	AHL	59	36	30	66	19	11	9	6	15	9
1947–48	Hershey Bears	AHL	49	19	19	38	25	2	0	1	1	0
1948–49	Hershey Bears	AHL	49	25	35	60	10	11	4	6	10	6
1949–50	Hershey Bears	AHL	41	12	14	26	8	—	—	—	—	—
NHL totals			572	206	192	398	177	67	16	13	29	13

== See also ==
- Notable families in the NHL
- List of past NHL scoring leaders

Preceded by Doug Bentley	NHL Scoring Champion; 1944	Succeeded by Elmer Lach
