= Ray Getliffe =

Canadian ice hockey player

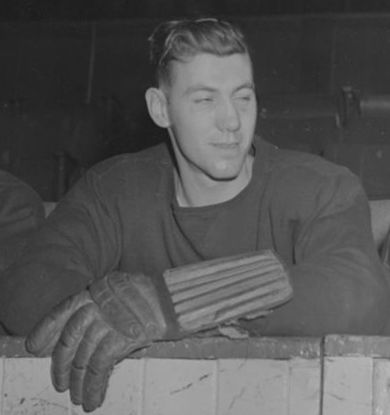
- Ray Getliffe, playing for the Montreal Canadiens in 1945
- Born: April 3, 1914 Galt, Ontario, Canada
- Died: June 15, 2008 (aged 94) London, Ontario, Canada
- Height: 5 ft 11 in (180 cm)
- Weight: 190 lb (86 kg; 13 st 8 lb)
- Position: Left wing
- Shot: Left
- Played for: Montreal Canadiens; Boston Bruins
- Playing career: 1935–1945

Raymond Getliffe (April 3, 1914 – June 15, 2008) was a Canadian professional ice hockey left winger who played 10 seasons in the National Hockey League for the Boston Bruins and Montreal Canadiens. Born in Galt, Ontario (now Cambridge, Ontario), he played with the Saint John St. Peters. At the time of his death, he was believed to be the oldest living former Montreal Canadiens player. Getliffe's name is on the Stanley Cup twice, for 1939 with Boston and 1944 with Montreal. On February 6, 1943, while playing for the Canadiens he scored five goals in one game.

After finishing his playing career, Getliffe briefly officiated in the NHL. Retired from hockey, Getliffe and his wife Lorna remained in Montreal until moving to London, Ontario in 1990, where he grew up.

Getliffe died in London of liver cancer at age 94. At the time of his death, reports claimed that he was the oldest living NHL alumnus, about four months older than ex-New York Ranger and Chicago Blackhawk Clint Smith. These reports, however, overlooked players who had only played a certain number of games, such as Louis Holmes and Al Suomi.

== Career statistics ==
=== Regular season and playoffs ===
			Regular season					Playoffs
Season	Team	League	GP	G	A	Pts	PIM	GP	G	A	Pts	PIM
1930–31	London Athletic Club	OHA-Int.	9	9	0	9	0	2	0	0	0	4
1931–32	London Diamonds	OHA-Jr.	6	8	4	12	—	—	—	—	—	—
1932–33	Stratford Midgets	OHA-Jr.	6	4	7	11	12	11	6	0	6	20
1933–34	Stratford Midgets	OHA-Jr.	13	26	17	43	18	2	6	1	7	12
1934–35	Charlottetown Abbeys	MSHL	20	15	4	19	29	—	—	—	—	—
1934–35	St. John's St. Peters	SJCHL	17	35	25	60	15	12	9	14	23	11
1934–35	St. John's Beavers	Exhib	2	1	1	2	6	—	—	—	—	—
1935–36	London Tecumsehs	IHL	17	6	3	9	17	—	—	—	—	—
1935–36	Boston Bruins	NHL	1	0	0	0	2	2	0	0	0	0
1935–36	Boston Cubs	Can-Am	29	16	14	30	14	—	—	—	—	—
1936–37	Boston Bruins	NHL	48	16	15	31	28	3	2	1	3	2
1937–38	Boston Bruins	NHL	36	11	13	24	16	3	0	1	1	2
1938–39	Boston Bruins	NHL	43	10	12	22	11	11	1	1	2	2
1938–39	Hershey Bears	IAHL	4	1	4	5	2	—	—	—	—	—
1939–40	Montreal Canadiens	NHL	46	11	12	23	29	—	—	—	—	—
1940–41	Montreal Canadiens	NHL	39	15	10	25	25	3	1	1	2	0
1941–42	Montreal Canadiens	NHL	45	11	15	26	35	3	0	0	0	0
1942–43	Montreal Canadiens	NHL	50	18	28	46	26	5	0	1	1	8
1943–44	Montreal Canadiens	NHL	44	28	25	53	44	9	5	4	9	16
1944–45	Montreal Canadiens	NHL	41	16	7	23	34	6	0	1	1	0
NHL totals			393	136	137	273	250	45	9	10	19	30

== See also ==
- List of players with 5 or more goals in an NHL game
