= Claude Bourque =

Canadian ice hockey player

- Born: March 31, 1915 Oxford, Nova Scotia, Canada
- Died: May 13, 1982 (aged 67) Ottawa, Ontario, Canada
- Position: Goaltender
- Caught: Left
- Played for: Montreal Canadiens; Detroit Red Wings
- Playing career: 1935–1943

Claude Hennessey Bourque (March 31, 1915 — May 13, 1982) was a Canadian ice hockey goaltender who played 62 games in the National Hockey League with the Montreal Canadiens and Detroit Red Wings between 1938 and 1940. The rest of his career, which lasted from 1935 to 1943, was spent in various minor and senior leagues. After his hockey career, Bourque worked for Northern Electric in Montreal. Bourque was born in Oxford, Nova Scotia and grew up in Moncton, New Brunswick.

== Career statistics ==
=== Regular season and playoffs ===
			Regular season								Playoffs
Season	Team	League	GP	W	L	T	Min	GA	SO	GAA	GP	W	L	T	Min	GA	SO	GAA
1928–29	Moncton St. Mary's	NBAHA	6	3	2	1	360	8	2	1.33	—	—	—	—	—	—	—	—
1929–30	Moncton St. Mary's	NBAHA	6	3	2	1	280	11	0	2.36	—	—	—	—	—	—	—	—
1930–31	Moncton CCJA	MCJHL	4	3	1	0	240	2	3	0.50	—	—	—	—	—	—	—	—
1930–31	Moncton CNR Machinists	MCIHL	2	1	1	0	120	4	0	2.00	—	—	—	—	—	—	—	—
1930–31	Moncton Aberdeens	CAHS	4	4	0	0	240	5	2	1.25	1	0	1	0	60	3	0	3.00
1931–32	Moncton CCJA	MCJHL	6	6	0	0	360	13	2	2.11	3	2	1	0	180	10	0	3.33
1932–33	Moncton Red Indians	MCJHL	5	4	0	1	330	8	2	1.46	2	0	0	0	120	5	0	2.50
1932–33	Moncton Red Indians	M-Cup	—	—	—	—	—	—	—	—	8	6	1	1	480	18	0	2.25
1933–34	Montreal Junior Canadiens	QJAHA	8	—	—	—	480	14	1	1.75	2	—	—	—	120	5	0	2.50
1934–35	Montreal Junior Canadiens	QJAHA	10	—	—	—	600	46	0	4.60	1	—	—	—	60	5	0	5.00
1935–36	Montreal Junior Canadiens	QSHL	21	—	—	—	1260	73	1	3.56	—	—	—	—	—	—	—	—
1936–37	Montreal Royals	MTL Sr	19	—	—	—	1140	44	2	2.32	5	—	—	—	300	13	0	2.60
1937–38	Verdun Maple Leafs	QSHL	18	—	—	—	1080	52	1	2.89	8	—	—	—	480	26	0	3.25
1938–39	Montreal Canadiens	NHL	25	9	12	4	1560	69	2	2.65	3	1	2	—	188	8	1	2.56
1938–39	Verdun Maple Leafs	QSHL	2	—	—	—	120	4	0	2.00	—	—	—	—	—	—	—	—
1938–39	Kansas City Greyhounds	AHA	3	0	3	0	214	15	0	4.21	—	—	—	—	—	—	—	—
1939–40	Montreal Canadiens	NHL	36	9	24	3	2210	120	3	3.26	—	—	—	—	—	—	—	—
1939–40	Detroit Red Wings	NHL	1	0	1	0	60	3	0	3.00	—	—	—	—	—	—	—	—
1939–40	New Haven Eagles	IAHL	6	1	5	0	360	26	0	4.33	—	—	—	—	—	—	—	—
1940–41	Philadelphia Ramblers	AHL	56	25	25	6	3470	167	1	2.89	—	—	—	—	—	—	—	—
1941–42	Buffalo Bisons	AHL	54	24	24	5	3350	150	1	2.69	—	—	—	—	—	—	—	—
1942–43	Lachine RCAF	MCHL	34	—	—	—	2040	142	1	4.18	12	—	—	—	720	24	0	2.83
NHL totals			92	18	37	7	3830	192	5	3.01	3	1	2	—	188	8	1	2.56
