= 1939–40 NHL season =

Professional ice hockey league season

- League: National Hockey League
- Sport: Ice hockey
- Duration: November 2, 1939 – April 13, 1940
- Games: 48
- Teams: 7

Regular season
- Season champion: Boston Bruins
- Season MVP: Ebbie Goodfellow (Red Wings)
- Top scorer: Milt Schmidt (Bruins)

Stanley Cup
- Champions: New York Rangers
- Runners-up: Toronto Maple Leafs

NHL seasons
- ← 1938–39 1940–41 →

The 1939–40 NHL season was the 23rd season for the National Hockey League. Seven teams played 48 games each. The Boston Bruins were the best in the regular season, but the Stanley Cup winners were the New York Rangers, who defeated the Toronto Maple Leafs in the best-of-seven final series 4–2 for their third Stanley Cup in 14 seasons of existence. It would be another 54 years before their fourth.

== League business ==
In June 1939, the Canadian Amateur Hockey Association notified the NHL of the request for development fees when signing amateur players to contracts, after the existing professional-amateur deal expired in 1940.

== Regular season ==
Tragedy struck the Montreal Canadiens when Babe Siebert, named coach of the struggling club, drowned along with his daughter in August. It put a big hole in the Habs defence and the team finished last under Pit Lepine. An all-star benefit was held in Siebert's memory.

The New York Americans, in financial trouble, decided to trade their star left wing Sweeney Schriner to Toronto for Harvey "Busher" Jackson, Buzz Boll, Murray Armstrong, and minor-leaguer Jimmy Fowler. Late in the season, they traded Eddie Wiseman and $5000 to Boston for Eddie Shore. The Americans then managed to make the playoffs by finishing a poor sixth. They also obtained Charlie Conacher and used him as a defenceman.

The first place Boston Bruins had a new coach in Cooney Weiland, their one-time captain, and were once again led by their Kraut Line, Milt Schmidt, Woody Dumart, and Bobby Bauer as they finished 1–2–3 in overall league scoring. Unfortunately, the potent three were unable to help the Bruins get past the first round of the playoffs as the Bruins lost in six games to the Rangers.

The New York Rangers were coasting in first place and went 19 consecutive games without a loss. They slumped in the second half, though, and Boston edged them out for first place.

The first NHL game broadcast on television was between the New York Rangers and Montreal Canadiens on February 25, 1940. The game was seen by only 300 people in a small area in the United States. This, though, was not the first ice hockey game broadcast on television, as a broadcast had been made in England in 1938. The CBC's first hockey broadcast was in 1952 between the Montreal Canadiens and Detroit Red Wings.

=== Final standings ===
National Hockey League
| | GP | W | L | T | GF | GA | PIM | Pts |
|---|---|---|---|---|---|---|---|---|
| **Boston Bruins** | 48 | 31 | 12 | 5 | 170 | 98 | 330 | 67 |
| **New York Rangers** | 48 | 27 | 11 | 10 | 136 | 77 | 520 | 64 |
| **Toronto Maple Leafs** | 48 | 25 | 17 | 6 | 134 | 110 | 485 | 56 |
| **Chicago Black Hawks** | 48 | 23 | 19 | 6 | 112 | 120 | 351 | 52 |
| **Detroit Red Wings** | 48 | 16 | 26 | 6 | 91 | 126 | 250 | 38 |
| **New York Americans** | 48 | 15 | 29 | 4 | 106 | 140 | 236 | 34 |
| Montreal Canadiens | 48 | 10 | 33 | 5 | 90 | 167 | 338 | 25 |

Note: GP = Games Played, W = Wins, L = Losses, T = Ties, GF = Goals For, GA = Goals Against, PIM = Penalty Minutes, Pts = Points
Teams that qualified for the playoffs are highlighted in bold.

== Playoffs ==
The Boston Bruins were expected to make the Stanley Cup Finals after a first overall finish during the regular season riding the shoulders of the "Kraut Line", but the New York Rangers were too much for the Bruins who lost in six games, got out-scored 14 to 8, and got shut-out twice in the Semifinals. The third seed Toronto Maple Leafs swept the Detroit Red Wings and Chicago Black Hawks en route to the Stanley Cup Finals. The Rangers Cup win would begin the 54 Year Curse, and they would not win another Cup until 1994.

=== Playoff bracket ===
The top six teams in the league qualified for the playoffs. The top two teams played in a best-of-seven Stanley Cup semifinal series. The third-place team then met the fourth-place team in one best-of-three series, and the fifth-place team faced the sixth-place team in another best-of-three series, to determine the participants for the other best-of-three semifinal series. The semifinal winners then met in a best-of-seven Stanley Cup Finals (scores in the bracket indicate the number of games won in each series).

Quarterfinals
3 | Toronto | 2
4 | Chicago | 0
5 | Detroit | 2
6 | NY Americans | 1

Semifinals
1 | Boston | 2
2 | NY Rangers | 4
3 | Toronto | 2
5 | Detroit | 0

Stanley Cup Finals
2 | NY Rangers | 4
3 | Toronto | 2

=== Quarterfinals ===
==== (3) Toronto Maple Leafs vs. (4) Chicago Black Hawks ====
| March 19 | Chicago Black Hawks | 2–3 | OT | Toronto Maple Leafs | Maple Leaf Gardens | Recap |
| Art Wiebe (1) – 02:31; Mush March (1) – sh – 19:41 | | First period | | No scoring |
| No scoring | | Second period | | No scoring |
| No scoring | | Third period | | 01:45 – Jack Church (1); 09:09 – Syl Apps (1) |
| No scoring | | First overtime period | | 06:36 – Syl Apps (2) |
| Paul Goodman | | Goalie stats | | Turk Broda |

| March 21 | Toronto Maple Leafs | 2–1 | Chicago Black Hawks | Chicago Stadium | Recap |
| No scoring | | First period | No scoring |
| Gordie Drillon (1) – 04:18 | | Second period | No scoring |
| Hank Goldup (1) – 11:56 | | Third period | 09:02 – pp – Bill Carse (1) |
| Turk Broda | | Goalie stats | Paul Goodman |

| Toronto won series 2–0 |

==== (5) Detroit Red Wings vs. (6) New York Americans ====
| March 19 | New York Americans | 1–2 | OT | Detroit Red Wings | Olympia Stadium | Recap |
| Johnny Gagnon (1) – 19:20 | | First period | | No scoring |
| No scoring | | Second period | | 01:29 – pp – Alex Motter (1) |
| No scoring | | Third period | | No scoring |
| No scoring | | First overtime period | | 00:25 – Syd Howe (1) |
| Earl Robertson | | Goalie stats | | Tiny Thompson |

| March 22 | Detroit Red Wings | 4–5 | New York Americans | Madison Square Garden III | Recap |
| No scoring | | First period | No scoring |
| Mud Bruneteau (1) – 10:58 | | Second period | 18:52 – Charlie Conacher (1) |
| Joe Fisher (1) – 05:54; Mud Bruneteau (2) – 08:18; Connie Brown (1) – 14:16 | | Third period | 05:10 – Hooley Smith (1); 16:15 – Tommy Anderson (1); 17:18 – Hooley Smith (2); 19:39 – Art Chapman (1) |
| Tiny Thompson | | Goalie stats | Earl Robertson |

| March 24 | New York Americans | 1–3 | Detroit Red Wings | Olympia Stadium | Recap |
| Hooley Smith (3) – 18:39 | | First period | 05:18 – Cecil Dillon (1) |
| No scoring | | Second period | No scoring |
| No scoring | | Third period | 07:33 – pp – Mud Bruneteau (3); 16:45 – Ken Kilrea (1) |
| Earl Robertson | | Goalie stats | Tiny Thompson |

| Detroit won series 2–1 |

=== Semifinals ===
==== (1) Boston Bruins vs. (2) New York Rangers ====
| March 19 | Boston Bruins | 0–4 | New York Rangers | Madison Square Garden III | Recap |
| No scoring | | First period | No scoring |
| No scoring | | Second period | 10:29 – Phil Watson (1); 12:13 – sh – Alex Shibicky (1) |
| No scoring | | Third period | 02:37 – sh – Mac Colville (1); 16:58 – Mac Colville (2) |
| Frank Brimsek | | Goalie stats | Dave Kerr |

| March 21 | New York Rangers | 2–4 | Boston Bruins | Boston Garden | Recap |
| Mac Colville (3) – sh – 03:45 | | First period | No scoring |
| No scoring | | Second period | 05:45 – pp – Flash Hollett (1); 08:19 – sh – Herb Cain (1); 19:34 – pp – Woody Dumart (1) |
| Dutch Hiller (1) – 09:56 | | Third period | 18:16 – Art Jackson (1) |
| Dave Kerr | | Goalie stats | Frank Brimsek |

| March 24 | New York Rangers | 3–4 | Boston Bruins | Boston Garden | Recap |
| No scoring | | First period | 07:21 – Eddie Wiseman (1) |
| Muzz Patrick (1) – 13:49 | | Second period | 16:06 – Bobby Bauer (1); 17:55 – Roy Conacher (1) |
| Babe Pratt (1) – 03:40; Lynn Patrick (1) – 12:35 | | Third period | 07:49 – Eddie Wiseman (2) |
| Dave Kerr | | Goalie stats | Frank Brimsek |

| March 26 | Boston Bruins | 0–1 | New York Rangers | Madison Square Garden III | Recap |
| No scoring | | First period | No scoring |
| No scoring | | Second period | No scoring |
| No scoring | | Third period | 10:40 – Muzz Patrick (2) |
| Frank Brimsek | | Goalie stats | Dave Kerr |

| March 28 | New York Rangers | 1–0 | Boston Bruins | Boston Garden | Recap |
| No scoring | | First period | No scoring |
| No scoring | | Second period | No scoring |
| Babe Pratt (2) – 04:27 | | Third period | No scoring |
| Dave Kerr | | Goalie stats | Frank Brimsek |

| March 30 | Boston Bruins | 1–4 | New York Rangers | Madison Square Garden III | Recap |
| Roy Conacher (2) – 19:53 | | First period | No scoring |
| No scoring | | Second period | 08:14 – Alf Pike (1) |
| No scoring | | Third period | 11:09 – Alex Shibicky (2); 12:494 – pp – Clint Smith (1); 14:46 – pp – Phil Watson (2) |
| Frank Brimsek | | Goalie stats | Dave Kerr |

| New York won series 4–2 |

==== (3) Toronto Maple Leafs vs. (5) Detroit Red Wings ====
| March 26 | Detroit Red Wings | 1–2 | Toronto Maple Leafs | Maple Leaf Gardens | Recap |
| No scoring | | First period | No scoring |
| No scoring | | Second period | 11:18 – pp – Syl Apps (3) |
| Connie Brown (2) – 10:26 | | Third period | 00:57 – Sweeney Schriner (1) |
| Tiny Thompson | | Goalie stats | Turk Broda |

| March 28 | Toronto Maple Leafs | 3–1 | Detroit Red Wings | Olympia Stadium | Recap |
| Red Heron (1) – 03:04; Hank Goldup (2) – 19:51 | | First period | No scoring |
| No scoring | | Second period | No scoring |
| Hank Goldup (3) – 07:07 | | Third period | 19:20 – Syd Howe (2) |
| Turk Broda | | Goalie stats | Tiny Thompson |

| Toronto won series 2–0 |

=== Stanley Cup Finals ===
| April 2 | Toronto Maple Leafs | 1–2 | OT | New York Rangers | Madison Square Garden III | Recap |
| Red Heron (2) – 11:01 | | First period | | 09:09 – pp – Art Coulter (1) |
| No scoring | | Second period | | No scoring |
| No scoring | | Third period | | No scoring |
| No scoring | | First overtime period | | 15:30 – Alf Pike (2) |
| Turk Broda | | Goalie stats | | Dave Kerr |

| April 3 | Toronto Maple Leafs | 2–6 | New York Rangers | Madison Square Garden III | Recap |
| Billy Taylor (1) – 05:01; Hank Goldup (4) – 06:01 | | First period | 15:14 – Bryan Hextall |
| No scoring | | Second period | 03:57 – Babe Pratt (3); 19:48 – pp – Bryan Hextall (2) |
| No scoring | | Third period | 06:26 – Bryan Hextall (3); 12:21 – pp – Dutch Heller (2); 13:09 – pp – Lynn Patrick (2) |
| Turk Broda | | Goalie stats | Dave Kerr |

| April 6 | New York Rangers | 1–2 | Toronto Maple Leafs | Maple Leaf Gardens | Recap |
| Phil Watson (3) – 18:19 | | First period | No scoring |
| No scoring | | Second period | No scoring |
| No scoring | | Third period | 10:32 – Gordie Drillon (2); 13:40 – Hank Goldup (5) |
| Dave Kerr | | Goalie stats | Turk Broda |

| April 9 | New York Rangers | 0–3 | Toronto Maple Leafs | Maple Leaf Gardens | Recap |
| No scoring | | First period | 19:20 – Gus Marker (1) |
| No scoring | | Second period | No scoring |
| No scoring | | Third period | 16:03 – Wally Stanowski (1); 19:26 – Gordie Drillon (3) |
| Dave Kerr | | Goalie stats | Turk Broda |

| April 11 | New York Rangers | 2–1 | 2OT | Toronto Maple Leafs | Maple Leaf Gardens | Recap |
| Neil Colville (1) – 12:21 | | First period | | No scoring |
| No scoring | | Second period | | 16:55 – Syl Apps (4) |
| No scoring | | Third period | | No scoring |
| Muzz Patrick (3) – 11:43 | | Second overtime period | | No scoring |
| Dave Kerr | | Goalie stats | | Turk Broda |

| April 13 | New York Rangers | 3–2 | OT | Toronto Maple Leafs | Maple Leaf Gardens | Recap |
| No scoring | | First period | | 06:52 – Syl Apps (5) |
| No scoring | | Second period | | 04:51 – Nick Metz (1) |
| Neil Colville (2) – 08:08; Alf Pike (3) – 10:01 | | Third period | | No scoring |
| Bryan Hextall (4) – 02:07 | | First overtime period | | No scoring |
| Dave Kerr | | Goalie stats | | Turk Broda |

| New York won series 4–2 |

== Awards ==
| Calder Trophy: (Best first-year player) | Kilby MacDonald, New York Rangers |
| Hart Trophy: (Most valuable player) | Ebbie Goodfellow, Detroit Red Wings |
| Lady Byng Trophy: (Excellence and sportsmanship) | Bobby Bauer, Boston Bruins |
| O'Brien Cup: (Stanley Cup runner-up) | Toronto Maple Leafs |
| Prince of Wales Trophy: (Regular season champion) | Boston Bruins |
| Vezina Trophy: (Fewest goals allowed) | Dave Kerr, New York Rangers |

=== All-Star teams ===
| First Team | Position | Second Team |
|---|---|---|
| Dave Kerr, New York Rangers | G | Frank Brimsek, Boston Bruins |
| Dit Clapper, Boston Bruins | D | Art Coulter, New York Rangers |
| Ebbie Goodfellow, Detroit Red Wings | D | Earl Seibert, Chicago Black Hawks |
| Milt Schmidt, Boston Bruins | C | Neil Colville, New York Rangers |
| Bryan Hextall, New York Rangers | RW | Bobby Bauer, Boston Bruins |
| Toe Blake, Montreal Canadiens | LW | Woody Dumart, Boston Bruins |
| Paul Thompson, Chicago Black Hawks | Coach | Frank Boucher, New York Rangers |

== Player statistics ==
Regular season

=== Scoring leaders ===
Note: GP = Games played; G = Goals; A = Assists; Pts = Points

| Player | Team | GP | G | A | Pts |
|---|---|---|---|---|---|
| Milt Schmidt | Boston Bruins | 48 | 22 | 30 | 52 |
| Woody Dumart | Boston Bruins | 48 | 22 | 21 | 43 |
| Bobby Bauer | Boston Bruins | 48 | 17 | 26 | 43 |
| Gordie Drillon | Toronto Maple Leafs | 43 | 21 | 19 | 40 |
| Bill Cowley | Boston Bruins | 48 | 13 | 27 | 40 |
| Bryan Hextall | New York Rangers | 48 | 24 | 15 | 39 |
| Neil Colville | New York Rangers | 48 | 19 | 19 | 38 |
| Syd Howe | Detroit Red Wings | 46 | 14 | 23 | 37 |
| Toe Blake | Montreal Canadiens | 48 | 17 | 19 | 36 |
| Murray Armstrong | New York Americans | 48 | 16 | 20 | 36 |

Source: NHL

=== Leading goaltenders ===
Note: GP = Games played; Min = Minutes played; GA = Goals against; GAA = Goals against average; W = Wins; L = Losses; T = Ties; SO = Shutouts

| Player | Team | GP | MIN | GA | GAA | W | L | T | SO |
|---|---|---|---|---|---|---|---|---|---|
| Dave Kerr | New York Rangers | 48 | 3000 | 77 | 1.54 | 27 | 11 | 10 | 8 |
| Paul Goodman | Chicago Black Hawks | 31 | 1920 | 62 | 1.94 | 16 | 10 | 5 | 4 |
| Frank Brimsek | Boston Bruins | 48 | 2950 | 98 | 1.99 | 31 | 12 | 5 | 6 |
| Turk Broda | Toronto Maple Leafs | 47 | 2900 | 108 | 2.23 | 25 | 17 | 5 | 4 |
| Cecil "Tiny" Thompson | Detroit Red Wings | 46 | 2830 | 120 | 2.54 | 16 | 24 | 6 | 3 |
| Earl Robertson | N.Y. Americans | 48 | 2960 | 140 | 2.84 | 15 | 29 | 4 | 6 |
| Claude Bourque | Montreal Canadiens | 36 | 2210 | 121 | 3.29 | 9 | 24 | 3 | 2 |
| Mike Karakas | Chicago Black Hawks | 17 | 1050 | 58 | 3.31 | 7 | 9 | 1 | 0 |

Playoffs

=== Playoff scoring leaders ===
Note: GP = Games played; G = Goals; A = Assists; Pts = Points; PIM = Penalty minutes

| Player | Team | GP | G | A | Pts | PIM |
|---|---|---|---|---|---|---|
| Phil Watson | New York Rangers | 12 | 3 | 6 | 9 | 16 |
| Neil Colville | New York Rangers | 12 | 2 | 7 | 9 | 18 |
| Syl Apps | Toronto Maple Leafs | 10 | 5 | 2 | 7 | 2 |
| Bryan Hextall | New York Rangers | 12 | 4 | 3 | 7 | 11 |
| Alex Shibicky | New York Rangers | 11 | 2 | 5 | 7 | 4 |
| Hank Goldup | Toronto Maple Leafs | 10 | 5 | 1 | 6 | 4 |
| Wilbert Hiller | New York Rangers | 12 | 2 | 4 | 6 | 2 |
| Mac Colville | New York Rangers | 12 | 3 | 2 | 5 | 6 |
| Mud Bruneteau | Detroit Red Wings | 5 | 3 | 2 | 5 | 0 |
| Alf Pike | New York Rangers | 12 | 3 | 1 | 4 | 6 |

=== Playoff leading goaltenders ===
Note: GP = Games played; Min = Minutes played; GAA = Goals against average; W = Wins; L = Losses; T = Ties; SO = Shutouts

| Player | Team | GP | Min | W | L | T | SO | GAA |
|---|---|---|---|---|---|---|---|---|
| Dave Kerr | New York Rangers | 12 | 770 | 8 | 4 | 0 | 3 | 1.56 |
| Turk Broda | Toronto Maple Leafs | 10 | 657 | 6 | 4 | 0 | 1 | 1.74 |
| Frank Brimsek | Boston Bruins | 6 | 360 | 2 | 4 | 0 | 0 | 2.50 |
| Tiny Thompson | Detroit Red Wings | 5 | 300 | 2 | 3 | 0 | 0 | 2.40 |
| Earl Robertson | New York Americans | 3 | 180 | 1 | 2 | 0 | 0 | 3.00 |
| Paul Goodman | Chicago Black Hawks | 2 | 127 | 0 | 2 | 0 | 0 | 2.36 |

== Coaches ==
- Boston Bruins: Cooney Weiland
- Chicago Black Hawks: Paul Thompson
- Detroit Red Wings: Jack Adams
- Montreal Canadiens: Babe Siebert and Alfred Lepine
- New York Americans: Red Dutton
- New York Rangers: Frank Boucher
- Toronto Maple Leafs: Dick Irvin

== Debuts ==
The following is a list of players of note who played their first NHL game in 1939–40 (listed with their first team, asterisk(*) marks debut in playoffs):

- Doug Bentley, Chicago Black Hawks
- Johnny Mowers, Detroit Red Wings
- Pat Egan, New York Americans
- Kilby MacDonald, New York Rangers

== Last games ==
The following is a list of players of note that played their last game in the NHL in 1939–40 (listed with their last team):

- Tiny Thompson, Detroit Red Wings
- Cecil Dillon, Detroit Red Wings
- Hec Kilrea, Detroit Red Wings
- Cy Wentworth, Montreal Canadiens
- Earl Robinson, Montreal Canadiens
- Armand Mondou, Montreal Canadiens
- Marty Barry, Montreal Canadiens
- Doc Romnes, New York Americans
- Art Chapman, New York Americans
- Nels Stewart, New York Americans
- Eddie Shore, New York Americans
- Cliff Barton, New York Rangers, last active player form the Pittsburgh Pirates (NHL) franchise.
- Johnny Gagnon, New York Rangers
- Red Horner, Toronto Maple Leafs

== See also ==
- 1939–40 NHL transactions
- List of Stanley Cup champions
- 1939 in sports
- 1940 in sports
