= 1940–41 Montreal Canadiens season =

NHL hockey team season

1940–41 Montreal Canadiens
- League: 6th NHL
- 1940–41 record: 16–26–6
- Home record: 11–9–4
- Road record: 5–17–2
- Goals for: 121
- Goals against: 143

Team information
- General manager: Tommy Gorman
- Coach: Dick Irvin
- Captain: Toe Blake
- Arena: Montreal Forum

Team leaders
- Goals: John Quilty (18)
- Assists: Toe Blake (20)
- Points: John Quilty (34)
- Penalty minutes: Red Goupille (81)
- Wins: Bert Gardiner (13)
- Goals against average: Bert Gardiner (2.75)

The 1940–41 Montreal Canadiens season was the 32nd season in club history. The team placed sixth in the regular season to qualify for the playoffs. The Canadiens lost in the quarter-finals against Chicago Black Hawks.

== Off-season ==
During the off-season, Dick Irvin was hired as the new coach of the team. Irvin had previously been the coach of the Toronto Maple Leafs. Maple Leafs' owner Conn Smythe, who wanted to hire Hap Day, suggested Irvin to the Canadiens.

== Regular season ==
Rookie Johnny Quilty led the team in scoring and the team increased its wins total to 16 from 10 in the previous season.

=== Final standings ===
National Hockey League
| | GP | W | L | T | Pts | GF | GA |
|---|---|---|---|---|---|---|---|
| **Boston Bruins** | 48 | 27 | 8 | 13 | 67 | 168 | 102 |
| **Toronto Maple Leafs** | 48 | 28 | 14 | 6 | 62 | 145 | 99 |
| **Detroit Red Wings** | 48 | 21 | 16 | 11 | 53 | 112 | 102 |
| **New York Rangers** | 48 | 21 | 19 | 8 | 50 | 143 | 125 |
| **Chicago Black Hawks** | 48 | 16 | 25 | 7 | 39 | 112 | 139 |
| **Montreal Canadiens** | 48 | 16 | 26 | 6 | 38 | 121 | 147 |
| New York Americans | 48 | 8 | 29 | 11 | 27 | 99 | 186 |

Note: GP = Games played, W = Wins, L = Losses, T = Ties, Pts = Points, GF = Goals for, GA = Goals against
Teams that qualified for the playoffs are highlighted in bold.

=== Record vs. opponents ===
1940–41 NHL Records
| Team | BOS | CHI | DET | MTL | NYA | NYR | TOR |
|---|---|---|---|---|---|---|---|
| Boston | — | 4–2–2 | 3–0–5 | 5–2–1 | 7–0–1 | 4–2–2 | 4–2–2 |
| Chicago | 2–4–2 | — | 2–6 | 3–4–1 | 3–2–3 | 4–3–1 | 2–6 |
| Detroit | 0–3–5 | 6–2 | — | 4–3–1 | 5–1–2 | 3–2–3 | 3–5 |
| Montreal | 2–5–1 | 4–3–1 | 3–4–1 | — | 4–3–1 | 2–5–1 | 1–6–1 |
| N.Y. Americans | 0–7–1 | 2–3–3 | 1–5–2 | 3–4–1 | — | 1–6–1 | 1–4–3 |
| N.Y. Rangers | 2–4–2 | 3–4–1 | 2–3–2 | 5–2–1 | 6–1–1 | — | 3–5 |
| Toronto | 2–4–2 | 6–2 | 5–3 | 6–1–1 | 4–1–3 | 5–3 | — |

== Playoffs ==
The Canadiens qualified for the playoffs and played the Chicago Black Hawks. The Black Hawks won the best-of-three series in three games, two games to one.

== Schedule and results ==
1940–41 regular season
November

| Game | Result | Date | Score | Opponent | Record |
|---|---|---|---|---|---|
| 1 | T | November 3, 1940 | 1–1 OT | Boston Bruins (1940–41) | 0–0–1 |
| 2 | L | November 10, 1940 | 1–3 | Chicago Black Hawks (1940–41) | 0–1–1 |
| 3 | L | November 14, 1940 | 2–6 | Toronto Maple Leafs (1940–41) | 0–2–1 |
| 4 | L | November 16, 1940 | 2–4 | @ Toronto Maple Leafs (1940–41) | 0–3–1 |
| 5 | T | November 17, 1940 | 4–4 OT | @ Chicago Black Hawks (1940–41) | 0–3–2 |
| 6 | L | November 21, 1940 | 1–2 | @ Detroit Red Wings (1940–41) | 0–4–2 |
| 7 | W | November 23, 1940 | 3–1 | New York Americans (1940–41) | 1–4–2 |
| 8 | L | November 24, 1940 | 1–2 | @ New York Americans (1940–41) | 1–5–2 |
| 9 | W | November 26, 1940 | 3–2 | @ Boston Bruins (1940–41) | 2–5–2 |
| 10 | L | November 30, 1940 | 1–6 | @ New York Rangers (1940–41) | 2–6–2 |

December

| Game | Result | Date | Score | Opponent | Record |
|---|---|---|---|---|---|
| 11 | L | December 5, 1940 | 2–3 | New York Rangers (1940–41) | 2–7–2 |
| 12 | W | December 7, 1940 | 3–2 | Detroit Red Wings (1940–41) | 3–7–2 |
| 13 | L | December 12, 1940 | 3–4 | @ Toronto Maple Leafs (1940–41) | 3–8–2 |
| 14 | W | December 15, 1940 | 2–1 OT | @ Detroit Red Wings (1940–41) | 4–8–2 |
| 15 | L | December 19, 1940 | 0–2 | @ Chicago Black Hawks (1940–41) | 4–9–2 |
| 16 | W | December 21, 1940 | 3–1 | Boston Bruins (1940–41) | 5–9–2 |
| 17 | W | December 26, 1940 | 7–5 | Chicago Black Hawks (1940–41) | 6–9–2 |
| 18 | W | December 28, 1940 | 3–0 | New York Americans (1940–41) | 7–9–2 |
| 19 | L | December 31, 1940 | 2–4 | @ New York Americans (1940–41) | 7–10–2 |

January

| Game | Result | Date | Score | Opponent | Record |
|---|---|---|---|---|---|
| 20 | W | January 1, 1941 | 2–1 | @ New York Rangers (1940–41) | 8–10–2 |
| 21 | T | January 4, 1941 | 3–3 OT | New York Rangers (1940–41) | 8–10–3 |
| 22 | L | January 5, 1941 | 0–3 | @ Detroit Red Wings (1940–41) | 8–11–3 |
| 23 | L | January 7, 1941 | 3–4 OT | Toronto Maple Leafs (1940–41) | 8–12–3 |
| 24 | L | January 9, 1941 | 1–3 OT | @ Chicago Black Hawks (1940–41) | 8–13–3 |
| 25 | L | January 11, 1941 | 1–2 | Boston Bruins (1940–41) | 8–14–3 |
| 26 | L | January 12, 1941 | 5–7 | @ Boston Bruins (1940–41) | 8–15–3 |
| 27 | W | January 16, 1941 | 5–1 | Chicago Black Hawks (1940–41) | 9–15–3 |
| 28 | W | January 18, 1941 | 2–1 | Detroit Red Wings (1940–41) | 10–15–3 |
| 29 | L | January 23, 1941 | 2–3 | Toronto Maple Leafs (1940–41) | 10–16–3 |
| 30 | T | January 25, 1941 | 2–2 OT | @ Toronto Maple Leafs (1940–41) | 10–16–4 |

February

| Game | Result | Date | Score | Opponent | Record |
|---|---|---|---|---|---|
| 31 | L | February 2, 1941 | 1–2 | @ New York Rangers (1940–41) | 10–17–4 |
| 32 | L | February 4, 1941 | 3–5 OT | @ Boston Bruins (1940–41) | 10–18–4 |
| 33 | T | February 6, 1941 | 4–4 OT | Detroit Red Wings (1940–41) | 10–18–5 |
| 34 | T | February 8, 1941 | 3–3 OT | New York Americans (1940–41) | 10–18–6 |
| 35 | L | February 9, 1941 | 3–6 OT | @ New York Americans (1940–41) | 10–19–6 |
| 36 | W | February 11, 1941 | 6–2 | New York Rangers (1940–41) | 11–19–6 |
| 37 | W | February 13, 1941 | 6–5 | @ Chicago Black Hawks (1940–41) | 12–19–6 |
| 38 | L | February 15, 1941 | 0–5 | Boston Bruins (1940–41) | 12–20–6 |
| 39 | L | February 16, 1941 | 1–2 | @ Detroit Red Wings (1940–41) | 12–21–6 |
| 40 | L | February 20, 1941 | 1–2 | @ Toronto Maple Leafs (1940–41) | 12–22–6 |
| 41 | W | February 22, 1941 | 7–3 | Chicago Black Hawks (1940–41) | 13–22–6 |
| 42 | L | February 27, 1941 | 2–5 | @ New York Rangers (1940–41) | 13–23–6 |

March

| Game | Result | Date | Score | Opponent | Record |
|---|---|---|---|---|---|
| 43 | L | March 1, 1941 | 1–3 | New York Rangers (1940–41) | 13–24–6 |
| 44 | W | March 2, 1941 | 3–2 | @ New York Americans (1940–41) | 14–24–6 |
| 45 | W | March 6, 1941 | 4–3 | Toronto Maple Leafs (1940–41) | 15–24–6 |
| 46 | L | March 8, 1941 | 0–4 | Detroit Red Wings (1940–41) | 15–25–6 |
| 47 | L | March 9, 1941 | 0–8 | @ Boston Bruins (1940–41) | 15–26–6 |
| 48 | W | March 15, 1941 | 6–0 | New York Americans (1940–41) | 16–26–6 |

Legend: Win (2 points) Loss (0 points) Tie (1 point)

== Player statistics ==
=== Regular season ===
==== Scoring ====
| Player | Pos | GP | G | A | Pts | PIM |
|---|---|---|---|---|---|---|
| John Quilty | C | 48 | 18 | 16 | 34 | 31 |
| Joe Benoit | RW | 45 | 16 | 16 | 32 | 32 |
| Toe Blake | LW | 48 | 12 | 20 | 32 | 49 |
| Ray Getliffe | C/LW | 39 | 15 | 10 | 25 | 25 |
| Murph Chamberlain | LW | 45 | 10 | 15 | 25 | 75 |
| Tony Demers | RW | 46 | 13 | 10 | 23 | 17 |
| Elmer Lach | C | 43 | 7 | 14 | 21 | 16 |
| Jack Adams | LW | 42 | 6 | 12 | 18 | 11 |
| Charlie Sands | C/RW | 43 | 5 | 13 | 18 | 4 |
| Polly Drouin | LW | 21 | 4 | 7 | 11 | 0 |
| Ken Reardon | D | 34 | 2 | 8 | 10 | 41 |
| Red Goupille | D | 48 | 3 | 6 | 9 | 81 |
| Jack Portland | D | 42 | 2 | 7 | 9 | 34 |
| Tony Graboski | LW/D | 34 | 4 | 3 | 7 | 12 |
| Lou Trudel | LW | 16 | 2 | 3 | 5 | 2 |
| Alex Singbush | D | 32 | 0 | 5 | 5 | 15 |
| Stuart Ernest Smith | LW | 3 | 2 | 1 | 3 | 2 |
| Jim O'Neil | C/RW | 12 | 0 | 3 | 3 | 0 |
| Georges Mantha | D/LW | 6 | 0 | 1 | 1 | 0 |
| Paul Bibeault | G | 4 | 0 | 0 | 0 | 0 |
| Wilf Cude | G | 3 | 0 | 0 | 0 | 0 |
| Bert Gardiner | G | 42 | 0 | 0 | 0 | 0 |
| Paul Haynes | C | 7 | 0 | 0 | 0 | 12 |
| Doug Young | D | 3 | 0 | 0 | 0 | 4 |

==== Goaltending ====
| Player | MIN | GP | W | L | T | GA | GAA | SO |
|---|---|---|---|---|---|---|---|---|
| Bert Gardiner | 2600 | 42 | 13 | 23 | 6 | 119 | 2.75 | 1 |
| Wilf Cude | 180 | 3 | 2 | 1 | 0 | 13 | 4.33 | 0 |
| Paul Bibeault | 210 | 4 | 1 | 2 | 0 | 15 | 4.29 | 0 |
| Team: | 2990 | 48 | 16 | 26 | 6 | 147 | 2.95 | 1 |

=== Playoffs ===
==== Scoring ====
| Player | Pos | GP | G | A | Pts | PIM |
|---|---|---|---|---|---|---|
| Joe Benoit | RW | 3 | 4 | 0 | 4 | 2 |
| Toe Blake | LW | 3 | 0 | 3 | 3 | 5 |
| Ray Getliffe | C/LW | 3 | 1 | 1 | 2 | 0 |
| Murph Chamberlain | LW | 3 | 0 | 2 | 2 | 11 |
| John Quilty | C | 3 | 0 | 2 | 2 | 0 |
| Elmer Lach | C | 3 | 1 | 0 | 1 | 0 |
| Charlie Sands | C/RW | 2 | 1 | 0 | 1 | 0 |
| Jack Portland | D | 3 | 0 | 1 | 1 | 2 |
| Jack Adams | LW | 3 | 0 | 0 | 0 | 0 |
| Tony Demers | RW | 2 | 0 | 0 | 0 | 0 |
| Polly Drouin | LW | 1 | 0 | 0 | 0 | 0 |
| Bert Gardiner | G | 3 | 0 | 0 | 0 | 0 |
| Red Goupille | D | 2 | 0 | 0 | 0 | 0 |
| Tony Graboski | LW/D | 3 | 0 | 0 | 0 | 6 |
| Jim O'Neil | C/RW | 3 | 0 | 0 | 0 | 0 |
| Ken Reardon | D | 3 | 0 | 0 | 0 | 4 |
| Alex Singbush | D | 3 | 0 | 0 | 0 | 4 |
| Stuart Ernest Smith | LW | 1 | 0 | 0 | 0 | 0 |

==== Goaltending ====
| Player | MIN | GP | W | L | GA | GAA | SO |
|---|---|---|---|---|---|---|---|
| Bert Gardiner | 214 | 3 | 1 | 2 | 8 | 2.24 | 0 |
| Team: | 214 | 3 | 1 | 2 | 8 | 2.24 | 0 |

Note:

Pos = Position;GP = Games played; G = Goals; A = Assists; Pts = Points; PIM = Penalty minutes; +/- = Plus/minus; PPG = Power-play goals; SHG = Short-handed goals; GWG = Game-winning goals
Pos = Position;GP = Games played; Min, TOI = Minutes played; W = Wins; L = Losses; T,T/OT = Ties; OTL = Overtime losses; GA = Goals-against; GAA = Goals-against average; SO = Shutouts; SA = Shots against; SV = Shots saved;SV% = Save percentage;

== Awards and records ==
- Calder Memorial Trophy : Johnny Quilty

== See also ==
- 1940–41 NHL season
