= 1940–41 Chicago Black Hawks season =

NHL ice hockey team season

1940–41 Chicago Black Hawks
- League: 5th NHL
- 1940–41 record: 16–25–7
- Home record: 11–10–3
- Road record: 5–15–4
- Goals for: 112
- Goals against: 139

Team information
- General manager: Frederic McLaughlin
- Coach: Paul Thompson
- Captain: Earl Seibert
- Arena: Chicago Stadium

Team leaders
- Goals: George Allen (14)
- Assists: Doug Bentley (20)
- Points: Bill Thoms (32)
- Penalty minutes: Joe Cooper (66)
- Wins: Sam LoPresti (9)
- Goals against average: Paul Goodman (2.50)

The 1940–41 Chicago Black Hawks season was the team's 15th season in the NHL, and they were coming off a very good regular season in 1939–40, finishing above .500 for the first time in 4 seasons, however, they were quickly eliminated in 2 games by the Detroit Red Wings in the playoffs.

The Black Hawks would have a rough regular season in 1940–41, slipping to a 16–25–7 record, good for 39 points and 5th place in the NHL, and a 2nd straight playoff berth. The Hawks would score 112 goals, the 2nd fewest in the 7 team league, and they would allow 139 goals, which was the 3rd most.

Bill Thoms would lead the club in scoring with 32 points, while George Allen would get a team high 14 goals, and Doug Bentley would lead the club with 20 assists. Team captain Earl Seibert would anchor the blueline, earning 20 points, while fellow defenceman Joe Cooper had a club high 66 penalty minutes.

In goal, Paul Goodman would start the season, however, after a 7–10–4 start and a 2.50 GAA, he would be replaced by Sam LoPresti. LoPresti would go on to a 9–15–3 record and a GAA of 3.02.

Chicago would play the 6th place team, the Montreal Canadiens in a best of 3 series in the 1st round of the playoffs, and in a close fought series, with all 3 games being decided by a goal, the Black Hawks would defeat the Canadiens and earn a 2nd round matchup against the Detroit Red Wings. The Red Wings, who finished 14 points ahead of Chicago, would sweep the Black Hawks in 2 games, eliminating the Hawks from the playoffs.

== Season standings ==
National Hockey League
	GP	W	L	T	Pts	GF	GA
**Boston Bruins**	48	27	8	13	67	168	102
**Toronto Maple Leafs**	48	28	14	6	62	145	99
**Detroit Red Wings**	48	21	16	11	53	112	102
**New York Rangers**	48	21	19	8	50	143	125
**Chicago Black Hawks**	48	16	25	7	39	112	139
**Montreal Canadiens**	48	16	26	6	38	121	147
New York Americans	48	8	29	11	27	99	186

Note: GP = Games played, W = Wins, L = Losses, T = Ties, Pts = Points, GF = Goals for, GA = Goals against
Teams that qualified for the playoffs are highlighted in bold.

=== Record vs. opponents ===
1940–41 NHL Records
Team	BOS	CHI	DET	MTL	NYA	NYR	TOR
Boston	—	4–2–2	3–0–5	5–2–1	7–0–1	4–2–2	4–2–2
Chicago	2–4–2	—	2–6	3–4–1	3–2–3	4–3–1	2–6
Detroit	0–3–5	6–2	—	4–3–1	5–1–2	3–2–3	3–5
Montreal	2–5–1	4–3–1	3–4–1	—	4–3–1	2–5–1	1–6–1
N.Y. Americans	0–7–1	2–3–3	1–5–2	3–4–1	—	1–6–1	1–4–3
N.Y. Rangers	2–4–2	3–4–1	2–3–2	5–2–1	6–1–1	—	3–5
Toronto	2–4–2	6–2	5–3	6–1–1	4–1–3	5–3	—

== Schedule and results ==
=== Regular season ===
1940–41 regular season
November

Game	Date	Visitor	Score	Home	Record	Points
1	November 7	New York Americans	1–0	Chicago Black Hawks	0–1–0	0
2	November 10	Chicago Black Hawks	3–1	Montreal Canadiens	1–1–0	2
3	November 12	Chicago Black Hawks	6–5	Boston Bruins	2–1–0	4
4	November 14	Chicago Black Hawks	2–2	New York Americans	2–1–1	5
5	November 17	Montreal Canadiens	4–4	Chicago Black Hawks	2–1–2	6
6	November 21	Boston Bruins	2–0	Chicago Black Hawks	2–2–2	6
7	November 23	Chicago Black Hawks	1–0	Toronto Maple Leafs	3–2–2	8
8	November 24	Toronto Maple Leafs	4–2	Chicago Black Hawks	3–3–2	8
9	November 29	Chicago Black Hawks	1–3	Detroit Red Wings	3–4–2	8

December

Game	Date	Visitor	Score	Home	Record	Points
10	December 1	New York Rangers	1–4	Chicago Black Hawks	4–4–2	10
11	December 5	Detroit Red Wings	5–1	Chicago Black Hawks	4–5–2	10
12	December 8	Boston Bruins	2–3	Chicago Black Hawks	5–5–2	12
13	December 12	Chicago Black Hawks	2–2	New York Americans	5–5–3	13
14	December 14	Chicago Black Hawks	1–2	Toronto Maple Leafs	5–6–3	13
15	December 15	Toronto Maple Leafs	4–1	Chicago Black Hawks	5–7–3	13
16	December 19	Montreal Canadiens	0–2	Chicago Black Hawks	6–7–3	15
17	December 22	New York Rangers	1–3	Chicago Black Hawks	7–7–3	17
18	December 25	Chicago Black Hawks	3–3	New York Rangers	7–7–4	18
19	December 26	Chicago Black Hawks	5–7	Montreal Canadiens	7–8–4	18
20	December 29	Chicago Black Hawks	1–2	Detroit Red Wings	7–9–4	18

January

Game	Date	Visitor	Score	Home	Record	Points
21	January 1	Detroit Red Wings	4–1	Chicago Black Hawks	7–10–4	18
22	January 5	Chicago Black Hawks	2–2	Boston Bruins	7–10–5	19
23	January 7	Chicago Black Hawks	3–2	New York Rangers	8–10–5	21
24	January 9	Montreal Canadiens	1–3	Chicago Black Hawks	9–10–5	23
25	January 12	Detroit Red Wings	1–2	Chicago Black Hawks	10–10–5	25
26	January 16	Chicago Black Hawks	1–5	Montreal Canadiens	10–11–5	25
27	January 19	Boston Bruins	4–4	Chicago Black Hawks	10–11–6	26
28	January 23	New York Americans	1–3	Chicago Black Hawks	11–11–6	28
29	January 26	New York Rangers	1–4	Chicago Black Hawks	12–11–6	30
30	January 28	Chicago Black Hawks	2–3	Boston Bruins	12–12–6	30
31	January 30	Chicago Black Hawks	4–5	New York Americans	12–13–6	30

February

Game	Date	Visitor	Score	Home	Record	Points
32	February 1	Chicago Black Hawks	1–3	Toronto Maple Leafs	12–14–6	30
33	February 2	Toronto Maple Leafs	1–4	Chicago Black Hawks	13–14–6	32
34	February 6	Chicago Black Hawks	2–6	New York Rangers	13–15–6	32
35	February 9	New York Rangers	2–1	Chicago Black Hawks	13–16–6	32
36	February 13	Montreal Canadiens	6–5	Chicago Black Hawks	13–17–6	32
37	February 14	Chicago Black Hawks	1–2	Detroit Red Wings	13–18–6	32
38	February 16	New York Americans	4–5	Chicago Black Hawks	14–18–6	34
39	February 20	Chicago Black Hawks	4–2	New York Americans	15–18–6	36
40	February 22	Chicago Black Hawks	3–7	Montreal Canadiens	15–19–6	36
41	February 23	Chicago Black Hawks	1–4	New York Rangers	15–20–6	36
42	February 27	Detroit Red Wings	0–1	Chicago Black Hawks	16–20–6	38

March

Game	Date	Visitor	Score	Home	Record	Points
43	March 2	Boston Bruins	4–3	Chicago Black Hawks	16–21–6	38
44	March 4	Chicago Black Hawks	2–3	Boston Bruins	16–22–6	38
45	March 9	New York Americans	2–2	Chicago Black Hawks	16–22–7	39
46	March 13	Chicago Black Hawks	2–3	Detroit Red Wings	16–23–7	39
47	March 15	Chicago Black Hawks	1–7	Toronto Maple Leafs	16–24–7	39
48	March 16	Toronto Maple Leafs	3–0	Chicago Black Hawks	16–25–7	39

Legend: Win (2 points) Loss (0 points) Tie (1 point)

== Playoffs ==
=== Black Hawks 2, Canadiens 1 ===
==== NHL quarter-finals ====
===== (5) Chicago Black Hawks vs. (6) Montreal Canadiens =====
March 20	Montreal Canadiens	1 – 2	Chicago Black Hawks	Chicago Stadium	Recap
Lach (1) – (Unassisted) – 8:14		First period	16:21 – Allen (1) – (Dahlstrom)
No scoring		Second period	No scoring
No scoring		Third period	7:57 – M. Bentley (1) – (D. Bentley, March)
Gardiner (0-1)		Goalie stats	LoPresti (1-0)

March 22	Chicago Black Hawks	3 – 4	2OT	Montreal Canadiens	Montreal Forum	Recap
Dahlstrom (1) – pp – (Mariucci) – 2:33		First period		8:01 – Benoit (1) – (Blake, Quilty); 14:02 – pp – Benoit (2) – (Blake)
Cooper (1) – (March, M. Bentley) – 3:13		Second period		10:51 – Benoit (3) – (Portland)
March (1) – (M. Bentley) – 10:13		Third period		No scoring
No scoring		Second overtime period		14:03 – Sands (1) – (Getliffe, Chamberlain)
LoPresti (1-1)		Goalie stats		Gardiner (1-1)

March 25	Montreal Canadiens	2 – 3	Chicago Black Hawks	Chicago Stadium	Recap
No scoring		First period	14:56 – Allen (2) – (Mariucci, Dahlstrom)
Joe Benoit (4) – (Blake, Quilty) 18:37; Getliffe (1) – (Chamberlain) – 18:58		Second period	12:11 – Dahlstrom (2) – (Papike, Allen)
No scoring		Third period	3:31 – Dahlstrom (3) – (Papike, Allen)
Gardiner (1-2)		Goalie stats	LoPresti (2-1)

Chicago wins series 2 – 1

=== Red Wings 2, Black Hawks 0 ===
==== NHL semi-finals ====
===== (3) Detroit Red Wings vs. (5) Chicago Black Hawks =====
March 27	Chicago Black Hawks	1 – 3	Detroit Red Wings	Detroit Olympia	Recap
No scoring		First period	19:59 – pp – Abel (1) – (Grosso, Howe)
No scoring		Second period	10:15 – Liscombe (2) – (Motter)
March (2) – (Mackay, M. Bentley) – 5:15		Third period	15:28 – Fisher (1) – (Liscombe, Motter)
LoPresti (2-2)		Goalie stats	Mowers (3-1)

March 30	Detroit Red Wings	2 – 1	OT	Chicago Black Hawks	Chicago Stadium	Recap
No scoring		First period		No scoring
Motter (1) – pp – (Liscombe, Howe) – 1:25		Second period		4:02 – pp – D. Bentley (1) – (March, Dahlstrom)
No scoring		Third period		No scoring
Giesebrecht (2) – (Howe, Bruneteau) – 9:52		First overtime period		No scoring
Mowers (4-1)		Goalie stats		LoPresti (2-3)

Detroit wins series 2 – 0

== Player statistics ==
=== Season statistics ===
Scoring leaders
Player	GP	G	A	Pts	PIM
Bill Thoms	47	13	19	32	8
George Allen	44	14	17	31	22
Doug Bentley	46	8	20	28	12
Cully Dahlstrom	40	11	14	25	6
John Chad	44	7	18	25	16
Phil Hergesheimer	47	8	16	24	9
Bill Carse	30	5	15	20	12

Goaltending
Player	GP	TOI	W	L	T	GA	SO	GAA
Paul Goodman	21	1320	7	10	4	55	2	2.50
Sam LoPresti	27	1670	9	15	3	84	1	3.02

=== Playoffs statistics ===
Scoring leaders
Player	GP	G	A	Pts	PIM
Cully Dahlstrom	5	3	3	6	2
Mush March	4	2	3	5	0
George Allen	5	2	2	4	10
Max Bentley	4	1	3	4	2
Doug Bentley	5	1	1	2	4

Goaltending
Player	GP	TOI	W	L	GA	SO	GAA
Sam LoPresti	5	343	2	3	12	0	2.10
