= List of Stanley Cup Final sweeps =

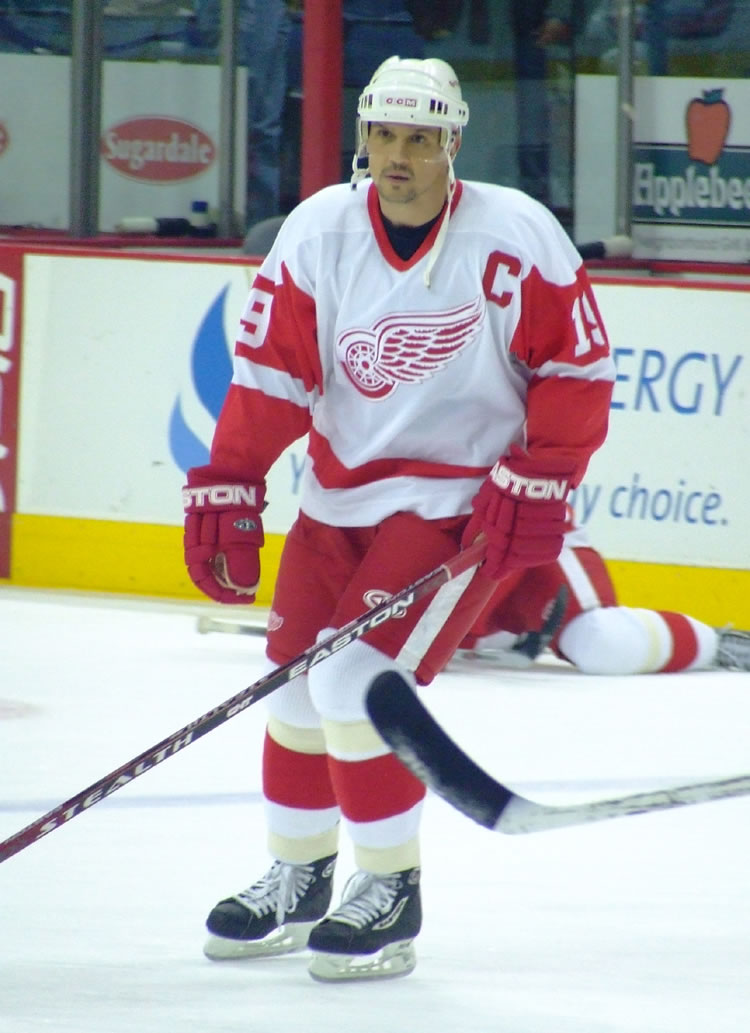
Steve Yzerman, won the Conn Smythe Trophy with the Detroit Red Wings in 1998, the most recent series to occur in a sweep.

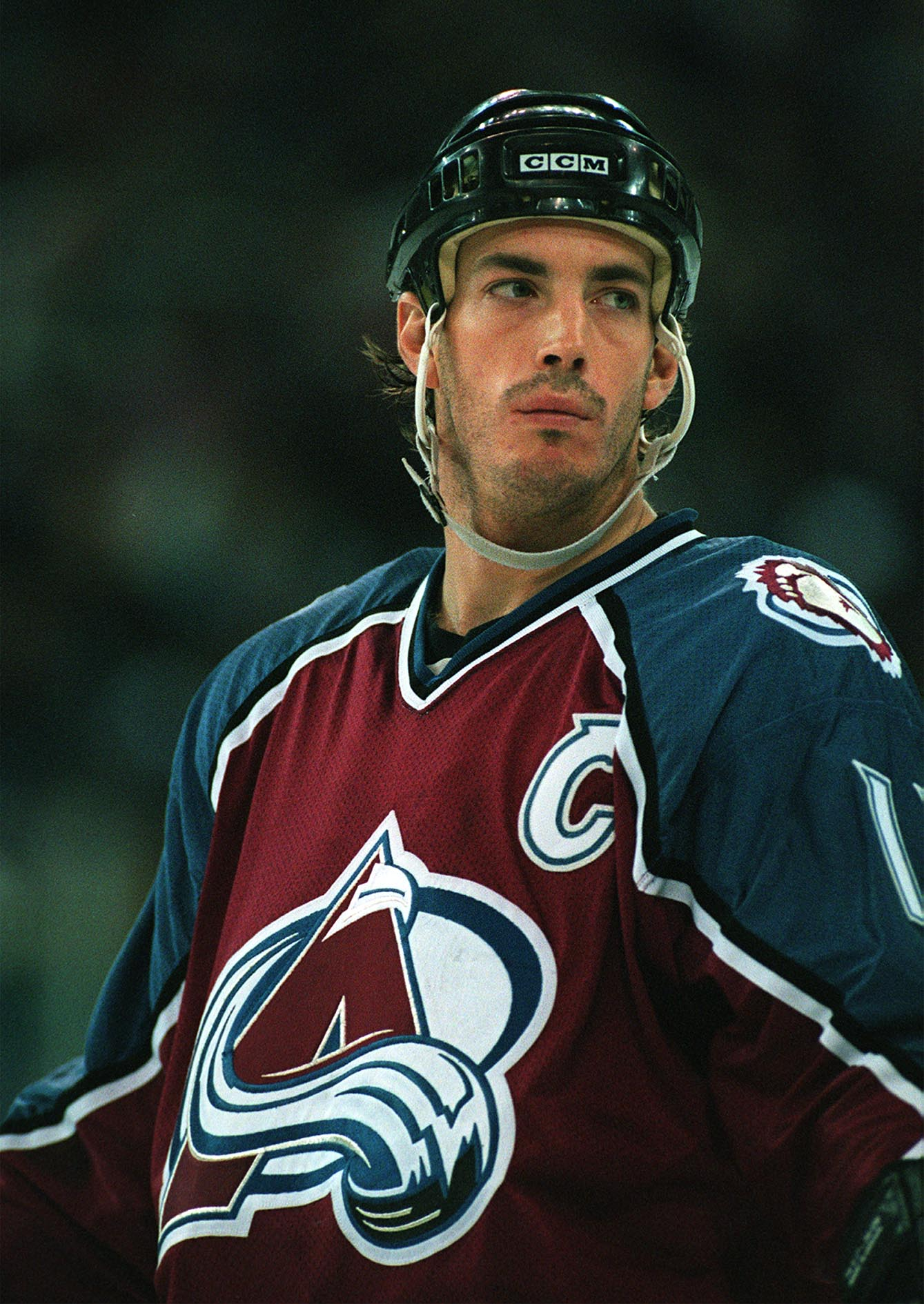
Joe Sakic, won the Conn Smythe Trophy with the Colorado Avalanche in 1996, their first championship in franchise's history.

Since the Stanley Cup Final expanded to a best-of-seven format in 1939, there have been 20 sweeps in which the Stanley Cup champion won four straight games and losing none.

The first 4–0 sweep is credited to the Boston Bruins who defeated the Detroit Red Wings in four straight games in the 1941 Stanley Cup Final. The most recent sweep occurred in the 1998 Stanley Cup Final, when the Detroit Red Wings defeated the Washington Capitals.

In the best-of-seven era, only two teams have ever completed a perfect postseason run: the Detroit Red Wings in 1952 and the Montreal Canadiens in 1960, with each winning all eight Stanley Cup playoff games.

== List of sweeps ==
=== Pre-NHL division alignment (1939–1967) ===
The National Hockey League's playoff format, and determining which teams advanced to the Stanley Cup Final, has changed multiple times. Prior to the 1966–67 season, the league had no divisions or conferences.

Year	Winning team	Head coaches	Losing team	Head coaches	Conn Smythe	Ref.
1941	Boston Bruins	Cooney Weiland	Detroit Red Wings	Jack Adams	(Note: The Conn Smythe Trophy started being awarded out to the most valuable player in the Stanley Cup playoffs since the 1964–65 NHL season.)	
1943	Detroit Red Wings	Jack Adams	Boston Bruins	Art Ross	(Note: The Conn Smythe Trophy started being awarded out to the most valuable player in the Stanley Cup playoffs since the 1964–65 NHL season.)	
1944	Montreal Canadiens	Dick Irvin	Chicago Black Hawks	Paul Thompson	(Note: The Conn Smythe Trophy started being awarded out to the most valuable player in the Stanley Cup playoffs since the 1964–65 NHL season.)	
1948	Toronto Maple Leafs	Hap Day	Detroit Red Wings	Tommy Ivan	(Note: The Conn Smythe Trophy started being awarded out to the most valuable player in the Stanley Cup playoffs since the 1964–65 NHL season.)	
1949	Toronto Maple Leafs	Hap Day	Detroit Red Wings	Tommy Ivan	(Note: The Conn Smythe Trophy started being awarded out to the most valuable player in the Stanley Cup playoffs since the 1964–65 NHL season.)	
1952	Detroit Red Wings	Tommy Ivan	Montreal Canadiens	Dick Irvin	(Note: The Conn Smythe Trophy started being awarded out to the most valuable player in the Stanley Cup playoffs since the 1964–65 NHL season.)	
1960	Montreal Canadiens	Toe Blake	Toronto Maple Leafs	Punch Imlach	(Note: The Conn Smythe Trophy started being awarded out to the most valuable player in the Stanley Cup playoffs since the 1964–65 NHL season.)	

=== East Division vs. West Division (1968–1971) ===
For three seasons after the 1967 NHL Expansion, the Final was competed between the East Division champion and the West Division champion. All three of those Finals ended with the East champion sweeping the West champion.

Year	Winning team	Head coaches	Losing team	Head coaches	Conn Smythe	Ref.
1968	Montreal Canadiens	Toe Blake	St. Louis Blues	Scotty Bowman	Glenn Hall	
1969	Montreal Canadiens	Claude Ruel	St. Louis Blues	Scotty Bowman	Serge Savard	
1970	Boston Bruins	Harry Sinden	St. Louis Blues	Scotty Bowman	Bobby Orr	

=== Division and conference cross-overs (1971–1981) ===
From 1971 to 1981, the league used playoff systems in which teams crossed over between the divisions and conferences, with the last two remaining teams meeting in the Final regardless. This was maintained through the 1974 realignment and the establishment of the Prince of Wales Conference and Campbell Conference.

Year	Winning team	Head coaches	Losing team	Head coaches	Conn Smythe	Ref.
1976	Montreal Canadiens	Scotty Bowman	Philadelphia Flyers	Fred Shero	Reggie Leach	
1977	Montreal Canadiens	Scotty Bowman	Boston Bruins	Don Cherry	Guy Lafleur	

=== Wales/Eastern Conference vs. Campbell/Western Conference (1982–present) ===
Since 1982, the champions of each of the league's two conferences have advanced to the Stanley Cup Final. The names of the conferences were changed for the 1993-94 season to reflect their geographic locations, with the Wales becoming the Eastern Conference, and the Campbell becoming the Western Conference.

PW or E Wales/Eastern Conference
CC or W Campbell/Western Conference

Year	Winning team	Head coaches	Losing team	Head coaches	Conn Smythe	Ref.
1982	New York Islanders (PW)	Al Arbour	Vancouver Canucks (CC)	Roger Neilson	Mike Bossy	
1983	New York Islanders (PW)	Al Arbour	Edmonton Oilers (CC)	Glen Sather	Billy Smith	
1988	Edmonton Oilers (CC)	Glen Sather	Boston Bruins (PW)	Terry O'Reilly	Wayne Gretzky	
1992	Pittsburgh Penguins (PW)	Scotty Bowman	Chicago Blackhawks (CC)	Mike Keenan	Mario Lemieux	
1995	New Jersey Devils (E)	Jacques Lemaire	Detroit Red Wings (W) (Note: The Red Wings were present in the Western Conference from 1993-94 until 2013-14.)	Scotty Bowman	Claude Lemieux	
1996	Colorado Avalanche (W)	Marc Crawford	Florida Panthers (E)	Doug MacLean	Joe Sakic	
1997	Detroit Red Wings (W)	Scotty Bowman	Philadelphia Flyers (E)	Terry Murray	Mike Vernon	
1998	Detroit Red Wings (W)	Scotty Bowman	Washington Capitals (E)	Ron Wilson	Steve Yzerman	
