= 1940–41 Toronto Maple Leafs season =

NHL hockey team season

1940–41 Toronto Maple Leafs
- League: 2nd NHL
- 1940–41 record: 28–14–6
- Home record: 16–5–3
- Road record: 12–9–3
- Goals for: 145
- Goals against: 99

Team information
- General manager: Conn Smythe
- Coach: Hap Day
- Captain: Syl Apps
- Arena: Maple Leaf Gardens

Team leaders
- Goals: Gordie Drillon (23)
- Assists: Syl Apps (24)
- Points: Gordie Drillon (44); Syl Apps (44)
- Penalty minutes: Reg Hamilton (59)
- Wins: Turk Broda (28)
- Goals against average: Turk Broda (2.00)

The 1940–41 Toronto Maple Leafs season was the Toronto franchise's 24th season of play.

== Offseason ==
Conn Smythe was making preparations for his eventual tour of duty in Europe. He felt that Dick Irvin would not be strong enough to deal with player issues while he was gone and Smythe convinced the Montreal Canadiens to hire Irvin. Smythe hired Hap Day as coach.

== Regular season ==
=== Final standings ===
National Hockey League
	GP	W	L	T	Pts	GF	GA
**Boston Bruins**	48	27	8	13	67	168	102
**Toronto Maple Leafs**	48	28	14	6	62	145	99
**Detroit Red Wings**	48	21	16	11	53	112	102
**New York Rangers**	48	21	19	8	50	143	125
**Chicago Black Hawks**	48	16	25	7	39	112	139
**Montreal Canadiens**	48	16	26	6	38	121	147
New York Americans	48	8	29	11	27	99	186

Note: GP = Games played, W = Wins, L = Losses, T = Ties, Pts = Points, GF = Goals for, GA = Goals against
Teams that qualified for the playoffs are highlighted in bold.

=== Record vs. opponents ===
1940–41 NHL Records
Team	BOS	CHI	DET	MTL	NYA	NYR	TOR
Boston	—	4–2–2	3–0–5	5–2–1	7–0–1	4–2–2	4–2–2
Chicago	2–4–2	—	2–6	3–4–1	3–2–3	4–3–1	2–6
Detroit	0–3–5	6–2	—	4–3–1	5–1–2	3–2–3	3–5
Montreal	2–5–1	4–3–1	3–4–1	—	4–3–1	2–5–1	1–6–1
N.Y. Americans	0–7–1	2–3–3	1–5–2	3–4–1	—	1–6–1	1–4–3
N.Y. Rangers	2–4–2	3–4–1	2–3–2	5–2–1	6–1–1	—	3–5
Toronto	2–4–2	6–2	5–3	6–1–1	4–1–3	5–3	—

== Schedule and results ==
1940–41 regular season
November

Game	Result	Date	Score	Opponent	Record
1	L	November 2, 1940	1–4	New York Rangers (1940–41)	0–1–0
2	W	November 9, 1940	3–0	Detroit Red Wings (1940–41)	1–1–0
3	W	November 14, 1940	6–2	@ Montreal Canadiens (1940–41)	2–1–0
4	W	November 16, 1940	4–2	Montreal Canadiens (1940–41)	3–1–0
5	W	November 17, 1940	4–1	@ Boston Bruins (1940–41)	4–1–0
6	W	November 21, 1940	2–1 OT	@ New York Americans (1940–41)	5–1–0
7	L	November 23, 1940	0–1	Chicago Black Hawks (1940–41)	5–2–0
8	W	November 24, 1940	4–2	@ Chicago Black Hawks (1940–41)	6–2–0
9	W	November 26, 1940	4–2	@ New York Rangers (1940–41)	7–2–0
10	W	November 30, 1940	6–1	New York Americans (1940–41)	8–2–0

December

Game	Result	Date	Score	Opponent	Record
11	W	December 1, 1940	3–1	@ Detroit Red Wings (1940–41)	9–2–0
12	W	December 7, 1940	3–2	Boston Bruins (1940–41)	10–2–0
13	W	December 12, 1940	4–3	Montreal Canadiens (1940–41)	11–2–0
14	W	December 14, 1940	2–1	Chicago Black Hawks (1940–41)	12–2–0
15	W	December 15, 1940	4–1	@ Chicago Black Hawks (1940–41)	13–2–0
16	L	December 17, 1940	2–5	@ Boston Bruins (1940–41)	13–3–0
17	T	December 21, 1940	2–2 OT	New York Americans (1940–41)	13–3–1
18	L	December 22, 1940	1–2	@ New York Americans (1940–41)	13–4–1
19	L	December 25, 1940	2–3	@ Detroit Red Wings (1940–41)	13–5–1
20	W	December 28, 1940	3–2	New York Rangers (1940–41)	14–5–1
21	L	December 29, 1940	2–3	@ New York Rangers (1940–41)	14–6–1

January

Game	Result	Date	Score	Opponent	Record
22	L	January 4, 1941	1–3	Detroit Red Wings (1940–41)	14–7–1
23	W	January 7, 1941	4–3 OT	@ Montreal Canadiens (1940–41)	15–7–1
24	W	January 9, 1941	3–2 OT	New York Rangers (1940–41)	16–7–1
25	W	January 11, 1941	9–0	New York Americans (1940–41)	17–7–1
26	L	January 18, 1941	0–1	Boston Bruins (1940–41)	17–8–1
27	T	January 19, 1941	3–3 OT	@ New York Americans (1940–41)	17–8–2
28	W	January 23, 1941	3–2	@ Montreal Canadiens (1940–41)	18–8–2
29	T	January 25, 1941	2–2 OT	Montreal Canadiens (1940–41)	18–8–3
30	W	January 26, 1941	2–0	@ Detroit Red Wings (1940–41)	19–8–3
31	W	January 30, 1941	2–1	Detroit Red Wings (1940–41)	20–8–3

February

Game	Result	Date	Score	Opponent	Record
32	W	February 1, 1941	3–1	Chicago Black Hawks (1940–41)	21–8–3
33	L	February 2, 1941	1–4	@ Chicago Black Hawks (1940–41)	21–9–3
34	L	February 8, 1941	2–3	Boston Bruins (1940–41)	21–10–3
35	W	February 15, 1941	4–3	New York Rangers (1940–41)	22–10–3
36	W	February 16, 1941	4–1	@ New York Rangers (1940–41)	23–10–3
37	T	February 18, 1941	2–2 OT	@ Boston Bruins (1940–41)	23–10–4
38	W	February 20, 1941	2–1	Montreal Canadiens (1940–41)	24–10–4
39	W	February 22, 1941	6–2	Detroit Red Wings (1940–41)	25–10–4
40	L	February 23, 1941	0–3	@ Detroit Red Wings (1940–41)	25–11–4
41	T	February 25, 1941	4–4 OT	@ New York Americans (1940–41)	25–11–5

March

Game	Result	Date	Score	Opponent	Record
42	T	March 1, 1941	0–0 OT	Boston Bruins (1940–41)	25–11–6
43	L	March 6, 1941	3–4	@ Montreal Canadiens (1940–41)	25–12–6
44	W	March 8, 1941	6–1	New York Americans (1940–41)	26–12–6
45	L	March 9, 1941	5–8	@ New York Rangers (1940–41)	26–13–6
46	L	March 11, 1941	2–3	@ Boston Bruins (1940–41)	26–14–6
47	W	March 15, 1941	7–1	Chicago Black Hawks (1940–41)	27–14–6
48	W	March 16, 1941	3–0	@ Chicago Black Hawks (1940–41)	28–14–6

Legend: Win (2 points) Loss (0 points) Tie (1 point)

== Playoffs ==
The Maple Leafs took on the first-place Boston Bruins in the semifinals. Boston would win the series four games to three. The Bruins would go on to win the Stanley Cup versus Detroit in four games.

1941 Stanley Cup playoffs
Semifinals vs. (1) Boston Bruins – Bruins win 4–3

Game	Date	Home	Home goals	Visitor	Visitor goals	OT
1	March 20	Boston Bruins	3	Toronto Maple Leafs	0	
2	March 22	Boston Bruins	3	Toronto Maple Leafs	5	
3	March 25	Toronto Maple Leafs	7	Boston Bruins	2	
4	March 27	Toronto Maple Leafs	1	Boston Bruins	2	
5	March 29	Boston Bruins	1	Toronto Maple Leafs	2	(OT)
6	April 1	Toronto Maple Leafs	1	Boston Bruins	2	
7	April 3	Boston Bruins	2	Toronto Maple Leafs	1	

Legend: Win Loss

== Player statistics ==
=== Regular season ===
Scoring

Player	Pos	GP	G	A	Pts	PIM
Gordie Drillon	RW	42	23	21	44	2
Syl Apps	C	41	20	24	44	6
Sweeney Schriner	LW	48	24	14	38	6
Nick Metz	LW	47	14	21	35	10
Billy Taylor	C	47	9	26	35	15
Wally Stanowski	D	47	7	14	21	35
Pete Langelle	C	47	4	15	19	0
Bucko McDonald	D	31	6	11	17	12
Hank Goldup	LW	26	10	5	15	9
Reg Hamilton	D	45	3	12	15	59
Red Heron	C	35	9	5	14	12
Don Metz	RW	31	4	10	14	6
Gus Marker	RW	27	4	5	9	10
Bob Davidson	LW	37	3	6	9	39
Bingo Kampman	D	39	1	4	5	53
Lex Chisholm	C/RW	26	4	0	4	8
Norman Mann	RW/C	15	0	3	3	2
Jack Church	D	11	0	1	1	22
Turk Broda	G	48	0	0	0	0

Goaltending

Player	MIN	GP	W	L	T	GA	GAA	SO
Turk Broda	2970	48	28	14	6	99	2.00	5
Team:	2970	48	28	14	6	99	2.00	5

=== Playoffs ===
Scoring

Player	Pos	GP	G	A	Pts	PIM
Nick Metz	LW	7	3	4	7	0
Syl Apps	C	7	3	2	5	2
Gordie Drillon	RW	7	3	2	5	2
Sweeney Schriner	LW	7	2	1	3	4
Reg Hamilton	D	7	1	2	3	13
Wally Stanowski	D	7	0	3	3	2
Billy Taylor	C	7	0	3	3	5
Bucko McDonald	D	7	2	0	2	2
Pete Langelle	C	7	1	1	2	0
Don Metz	RW	7	1	1	2	2
Bob Davidson	LW	7	0	2	2	7
Red Heron	C	7	0	2	2	0
Lex Chisholm	C/RW	3	1	0	1	0
Turk Broda	G	7	0	0	0	0
Jack Church	D	5	0	0	0	8
Hank Goldup	LW	7	0	0	0	0
Bingo Kampman	D	7	0	0	0	0
Norman Mann	RW/C	1	0	0	0	0
Gus Marker	RW	7	0	0	0	5

Goaltending

Player	MIN	GP	W	L	GA	GAA	SO
Turk Broda	438	7	3	4	15	2.05	0
Team:	438	7	3	4	15	2.05	0

Note:

Pos = Position;GP = Games played; G = Goals; A = Assists; Pts = Points; PIM = Penalty minutes; +/- = Plus/minus; PPG = Power-play goals; SHG = Short-handed goals; GWG = Game-winning goals
Pos = Position;GP = Games played; Min, TOI = Minutes played; W = Wins; L = Losses; T,T/OT = Ties; OTL = Overtime losses; GA = Goals-against; GAA = Goals-against average; SO = Shutouts; SA = Shots against; SV = Shots saved;SV% = Save percentage;

== Transactions ==
- May 10, 1940: Traded Murph Chamberlain to the Montreal Canadiens for $7,500
- May 10, 1940: Traded Pep Kelly to the Chicago Black Hawks for cash
- June 7, 1940: Acquired Frank Eddolls from the Montreal Canadiens for Joe Benoit
- July 1, 1940: Acquired Chuck Shannon from the New York Americans for cash
- October 20, 1940: Traded Chuck Shannon to the Buffalo Bisons of the AHL for cash
- October 22, 1940: Traded Phil Stein to the New Haven Eagles of the AHL for cash
- October 31, 1940: Signed Free Agent Nick Knott
- January 17, 1941: Acquired Jack Howard and Loan of Peanuts O'Flaherty from the New York Americans for Clarence Drouillard
