= 1940–41 Detroit Red Wings season =

Sports season

1940–41 Detroit Red Wings
- League: 3rd NHL
- 1940–41 record: 21–16–11
- Home record: 14–5–5
- Road record: 7–11–6
- Goals for: 112
- Goals against: 102

Team information
- General manager: Jack Adams
- Coach: Jack Adams
- Captain: Ebbie Goodfellow
- Arena: Detroit Olympia

Team leaders
- Goals: Syd Howe (20)
- Assists: Syd Howe (24)
- Points: Syd Howe (44)
- Penalty minutes: Jimmy Orlando (99)
- Wins: Johnny Mowers (21)
- Goals against average: Johnny Mowers (2.01)

The 1940–41 Detroit Red Wings season was the 15th season for the Detroit NHL franchise, ninth as the Red Wings. The Red Wings made it to the Stanley Cup Finals, losing to the Boston Bruins.

== Regular season ==
=== Final standings ===
National Hockey League
	GP	W	L	T	Pts	GF	GA
**Boston Bruins**	48	27	8	13	67	168	102
**Toronto Maple Leafs**	48	28	14	6	62	145	99
**Detroit Red Wings**	48	21	16	11	53	112	102
**New York Rangers**	48	21	19	8	50	143	125
**Chicago Black Hawks**	48	16	25	7	39	112	139
**Montreal Canadiens**	48	16	26	6	38	121	147
New York Americans	48	8	29	11	27	99	186

Note: GP = Games played, W = Wins, L = Losses, T = Ties, Pts = Points, GF = Goals for, GA = Goals against
Teams that qualified for the playoffs are highlighted in bold.

=== Record vs. opponents ===
1940–41 NHL Records
Team	BOS	CHI	DET	MTL	NYA	NYR	TOR
Boston	—	4–2–2	3–0–5	5–2–1	7–0–1	4–2–2	4–2–2
Chicago	2–4–2	—	2–6	3–4–1	3–2–3	4–3–1	2–6
Detroit	0–3–5	6–2	—	4–3–1	5–1–2	3–2–3	3–5
Montreal	2–5–1	4–3–1	3–4–1	—	4–3–1	2–5–1	1–6–1
N.Y. Americans	0–7–1	2–3–3	1–5–2	3–4–1	—	1–6–1	1–4–3
N.Y. Rangers	2–4–2	3–4–1	2–3–2	5–2–1	6–1–1	—	3–5
Toronto	2–4–2	6–2	5–3	6–1–1	4–1–3	5–3	—

== Schedule and results ==
1940–41 regular season
November

Game	Result	Date	Score	Opponent	Record
1	W	November 3, 1940	4–2	New York Americans (1940–41)	1–0–0
2	L	November 9, 1940	0–3	@ Toronto Maple Leafs (1940–41)	1–1–0
3	T	November 10, 1940	2–2 OT	New York Rangers (1940–41)	1–1–1
4	T	November 16, 1940	3–3 OT	@ New York Rangers (1940–41)	1–1–2
5	W	November 17, 1940	2–0	@ New York Americans (1940–41)	2–1–2
6	T	November 19, 1940	4–4 OT	@ Boston Bruins (1940–41)	2–1–3
7	W	November 21, 1940	2–1	Montreal Canadiens (1940–41)	3–1–3
8	T	November 24, 1940	1–1 OT	Boston Bruins (1940–41)	3–1–4
9	W	November 29, 1940	3–1	Chicago Black Hawks (1940–41)	4–1–4

December

Game	Result	Date	Score	Opponent	Record
10	L	December 1, 1940	1–3	Toronto Maple Leafs (1940–41)	4–2–4
11	W	December 5, 1940	5–1	@ Chicago Black Hawks (1940–41)	5–2–4
12	L	December 7, 1940	2–3	@ Montreal Canadiens (1940–41)	5–3–4
13	W	December 8, 1940	3–1	@ New York Rangers (1940–41)	6–3–4
14	W	December 13, 1940	3–2 OT	New York Rangers (1940–41)	7–3–4
15	L	December 15, 1940	1–2 OT	Montreal Canadiens (1940–41)	7–4–4
16	L	December 17, 1940	2–3 OT	@ New York Americans (1940–41)	7–5–4
17	T	December 19, 1940	1–1 OT	New York Americans (1940–41)	7–5–5
18	L	December 22, 1940	3–5	Boston Bruins (1940–41)	7–6–5
19	W	December 25, 1940	3–2	Toronto Maple Leafs (1940–41)	8–6–5
20	W	December 29, 1940	2–1	Chicago Black Hawks (1940–41)	9–6–5

January

Game	Result	Date	Score	Opponent	Record
21	W	January 1, 1941	4–1	@ Chicago Black Hawks (1940–41)	10–6–5
22	W	January 4, 1941	3–1	@ Toronto Maple Leafs (1940–41)	11–6–5
23	W	January 5, 1941	3–0	Montreal Canadiens (1940–41)	12–6–5
24	T	January 7, 1941	1–1 OT	@ Boston Bruins (1940–41)	12–6–6
25	T	January 9, 1941	3–3 OT	@ New York Americans (1940–41)	12–6–7
26	L	January 12, 1941	1–2	@ Chicago Black Hawks (1940–41)	12–7–7
27	T	January 14, 1941	3–3 OT	@ New York Rangers (1940–41)	12–7–8
28	L	January 18, 1941	1–2	@ Montreal Canadiens (1940–41)	12–8–8
29	L	January 19, 1941	1–2	New York Rangers (1940–41)	12–9–8
30	W	January 24, 1941	4–2 OT	New York Americans (1940–41)	13–9–8
31	L	January 26, 1941	0–2	Toronto Maple Leafs (1940–41)	13–10–8
32	L	January 30, 1941	1–2	@ Toronto Maple Leafs (1940–41)	13–11–8

February

Game	Result	Date	Score	Opponent	Record
33	T	February 6, 1941	4–4 OT	@ Montreal Canadiens (1940–41)	13–11–9
34	T	February 9, 1941	2–2 OT	Boston Bruins (1940–41)	13–11–10
35	L	February 11, 1941	0–4	@ Boston Bruins (1940–41)	13–12–10
36	W	February 14, 1941	2–1	Chicago Black Hawks (1940–41)	14–12–10
37	W	February 16, 1941	2–1	Montreal Canadiens (1940–41)	15–12–10
38	L	February 22, 1941	2–6	@ Toronto Maple Leafs (1940–41)	15–13–10
39	W	February 23, 1941	3–0	Toronto Maple Leafs (1940–41)	16–13–10
40	L	February 27, 1941	0–1	@ Chicago Black Hawks (1940–41)	16–14–10
41	W	February 28, 1941	5–4	New York Americans (1940–41)	17–14–10

March

Game	Result	Date	Score	Opponent	Record
42	W	March 2, 1941	4–2 OT	New York Rangers (1940–41)	18–14–10
43	L	March 4, 1941	0–6	@ New York Rangers (1940–41)	18–15–10
44	W	March 6, 1941	6–1	@ New York Americans (1940–41)	19–15–10
45	W	March 8, 1941	4–0	@ Montreal Canadiens (1940–41)	20–15–10
46	W	March 13, 1941	3–2	Chicago Black Hawks (1940–41)	21–15–10
47	T	March 16, 1941	2–2 OT	Boston Bruins (1940–41)	21–15–11
48	L	March 18, 1941	1–4	@ Boston Bruins (1940–41)	21–16–11

Legend: Win (2 points) Loss (0 points) Tie (1 point)

== Playoffs ==
=== (3) Detroit Red Wings vs. (4) New York Rangers ===
New York Rangers vs Detroit Red Wings
Date	Visitors	Score	Home	Score
Mar 20	New York R.	1	Detroit	2 (OT)
Mar 23	Detroit	1	New York R.	3
Mar 25	New York R.	2	Detroit	3

Detroit wins best-of-three series 2–1.

=== (3) Detroit Red Wings vs. (5) Chicago Black Hawks ===
Chicago Black Hawks vs Detroit Red Wings
Date	Visitors	Score	Home	Score
Mar 27	Chicago	1	Detroit	3
Mar 30	Detroit	2	Chicago	1 (OT)

Detroit wins best-of-three series 2–0.

=== (1) Boston Bruins vs. (3) Detroit Red Wings ===
Detroit Red Wings vs Boston Bruins
Date	Visitors	Score	Home	Score
Apr 6	Detroit	2	Boston	3
Apr 8	Detroit	1	Boston	2
Apr 10	Boston	4	Detroit	2
Apr 12	Boston	3	Detroit	1

Boston wins the Stanley Cup 4–0.

== Player statistics ==
=== Regular season ===
Scoring

Player	Pos	GP	G	A	Pts	PIM
Syd Howe	C/LW	48	20	24	44	8
Sid Abel	C/LW	47	11	22	33	29
Mud Bruneteau	RW	45	11	17	28	12
Eddie Wares	D/RW	42	10	16	26	34
Alex Motter	C	47	13	12	25	18
Gus Giesebrecht	C	43	7	18	25	7
Ebbie Goodfellow	C/D	47	5	17	22	35
Carl Liscombe	LW	33	10	10	20	0
Don Grosso	LW/C	45	8	7	15	14
Joe Fisher	RW	27	5	8	13	11
Jimmy Orlando	D	48	1	10	11	99
Jack Stewart	D	47	2	6	8	56
Bill Jennings	RW	12	1	5	6	2
Joe Carveth	RW	19	2	1	3	2
Connie Brown	C	3	1	2	3	0
Les Douglas	C	18	1	2	3	2
Art Herchenratter	LW	10	1	2	3	2
Ken Kilrea	LW	15	2	0	2	0
Eddie Bruneteau	RW	11	1	1	2	2
Bob Whitelaw	D	23	0	2	2	2
Arch Wilder	LW	18	0	2	2	2
Dick Behling	D	3	0	0	0	0
Harold Jackson	D	1	0	0	0	0
Johnny Mowers	G	48	0	0	0	0

Goaltending

Player	MIN	GP	W	L	T	GA	GAA	SO
Johnny Mowers	3040	48	21	16	11	102	2.01	4
Team:	3040	48	21	16	11	102	2.01	4

=== Playoffs ===
Scoring

Player	Pos	GP	G	A	Pts	PIM
Syd Howe	C/LW	9	1	7	8	0
Carl Liscombe	LW	8	4	3	7	12
Don Grosso	LW/C	9	1	4	5	0
Sid Abel	C/LW	9	2	2	4	2
Bill Jennings	RW	9	2	2	4	0
Alex Motter	C	9	1	3	4	4
Mud Bruneteau	RW	9	2	1	3	2
Gus Giesebrecht	C	9	2	1	3	0
Jack Stewart	D	9	1	2	3	8
Connie Brown	C	9	0	2	2	0
Jimmy Orlando	D	9	0	2	2	31
Joe Fisher	RW	5	1	0	1	6
Ebbie Goodfellow	C/D	3	0	1	1	9
Eddie Bruneteau	RW	3	0	0	0	0
Ken Kilrea	LW	5	0	0	0	0
Johnny Mowers	G	9	0	0	0	0
Eddie Wares	D/RW	9	0	0	0	0
Bob Whitelaw	D	8	0	0	0	0

Goaltending

Player	MIN	GP	W	L	GA	GAA	SO
Johnny Mowers	561	9	4	5	20	2.14	0
Team:	561	9	4	5	20	2.14	0

Note: GP = Games played; G = Goals; A = Assists; Pts = Points; +/- = Plus-minus PIM = Penalty minutes; PPG = Power-play goals; SHG = Short-handed goals; GWG = Game-winning goals;
MIN = Minutes played; W = Wins; L = Losses; T = Ties; GA = Goals against; GAA = Goals-against average; SO = Shutouts;

== See also ==
- 1940–41 NHL season
