= 1940–41 New York Americans season =

National Hockey League team season

1940–41 New York Americans
- League: 7th NHL
- 1940–41 record: 8–29–11
- Home record: 7–10–7
- Road record: 1–19–4
- Goals for: 99
- Goals against: 186

Team information
- Coach: Art Chapman
- Captain: Charlie Conacher
- Arena: Madison Square Garden

Team leaders
- Goals: Lorne Carr (13)
- Assists: Lorne Carr (19)
- Points: Lorne Carr (32)
- Penalty minutes: Peter Slobodian (54)
- Wins: Earl Robertson (6)
- Goals against average: Chuck Rayner (3.42)

The 1940–41 New York Americans season was the Americans' 16th season of play. The Americans did not qualify for the playoffs.

== Regular season ==
=== Final standings ===
National Hockey League
	GP	W	L	T	Pts	GF	GA
**Boston Bruins**	48	27	8	13	67	168	102
**Toronto Maple Leafs**	48	28	14	6	62	145	99
**Detroit Red Wings**	48	21	16	11	53	112	102
**New York Rangers**	48	21	19	8	50	143	125
**Chicago Black Hawks**	48	16	25	7	39	112	139
**Montreal Canadiens**	48	16	26	6	38	121	147
New York Americans	48	8	29	11	27	99	186

Note: GP = Games played, W = Wins, L = Losses, T = Ties, Pts = Points, GF = Goals for, GA = Goals against
Teams that qualified for the playoffs are highlighted in bold.

=== Record vs. opponents ===
1940–41 NHL Records
Team	BOS	CHI	DET	MTL	NYA	NYR	TOR
Boston	—	4–2–2	3–0–5	5–2–1	7–0–1	4–2–2	4–2–2
Chicago	2–4–2	—	2–6	3–4–1	3–2–3	4–3–1	2–6
Detroit	0–3–5	6–2	—	4–3–1	5–1–2	3–2–3	3–5
Montreal	2–5–1	4–3–1	3–4–1	—	4–3–1	2–5–1	1–6–1
N.Y. Americans	0–7–1	2–3–3	1–5–2	3–4–1	—	1–6–1	1–4–3
N.Y. Rangers	2–4–2	3–4–1	2–3–2	5–2–1	6–1–1	—	3–5
Toronto	2–4–2	6–2	5–3	6–1–1	4–1–3	5–3	—

== Schedule and results ==
1940–41 regular season
November

Game	Result	Date	Score	Opponent	Record
1	L	November 3, 1940	2–4	@ Detroit Red Wings (1940–41)	0–1–0
2	W	November 7, 1940	1–0	@ Chicago Black Hawks (1940–41)	1–1–0
3	T	November 14, 1940	2–2 OT	Chicago Black Hawks (1940–41)	1–1–1
4	L	November 17, 1940	0–2	Detroit Red Wings (1940–41)	1–2–1
5	L	November 19, 1940	2–3	@ New York Rangers (1940–41)	1–3–1
6	L	November 21, 1940	1–2 OT	Toronto Maple Leafs (1940–41)	1–4–1
7	L	November 23, 1940	1–3	@ Montreal Canadiens (1940–41)	1–5–1
8	W	November 24, 1940	2–1	Montreal Canadiens (1940–41)	2–5–1
9	W	November 28, 1940	2–1	New York Rangers (1940–41)	3–5–1
10	L	November 30, 1940	1–6	@ Toronto Maple Leafs (1940–41)	3–6–1

December

Game	Result	Date	Score	Opponent	Record
11	L	December 1, 1940	3–10	Boston Bruins (1940–41)	3–7–1
12	L	December 3, 1940	2–6	@ Boston Bruins (1940–41)	3–8–1
13	T	December 12, 1940	2–2 OT	Chicago Black Hawks (1940–41)	3–8–2
14	L	December 15, 1940	3–6	@ New York Rangers (1940–41)	3–9–2
15	W	December 17, 1940	3–2 OT	Detroit Red Wings (1940–41)	4–9–2
16	T	December 19, 1940	1–1 OT	@ Detroit Red Wings (1940–41)	4–9–3
17	T	December 21, 1940	2–2 OT	@ Toronto Maple Leafs (1940–41)	4–9–4
18	W	December 22, 1940	2–1	Toronto Maple Leafs (1940–41)	5–9–4
19	L	December 25, 1940	1–8	@ Boston Bruins (1940–41)	5–10–4
20	T	December 27, 1940	3–3 OT	Boston Bruins (1940–41)	5–10–5
21	L	December 28, 1940	0–3	@ Montreal Canadiens (1940–41)	5–11–5
22	W	December 31, 1940	4–2	Montreal Canadiens (1940–41)	6–11–5

January

Game	Result	Date	Score	Opponent	Record
23	L	January 5, 1941	2–6	New York Rangers (1940–41)	6–12–5
24	T	January 9, 1941	3–3 OT	Detroit Red Wings (1940–41)	6–12–6
25	L	January 11, 1941	0–9	@ Toronto Maple Leafs (1940–41)	6–13–6
26	L	January 12, 1941	1–3	@ New York Rangers (1940–41)	6–14–6
27	T	January 19, 1941	3–3 OT	Toronto Maple Leafs (1940–41)	6–14–7
28	L	January 23, 1941	1–3	@ Chicago Black Hawks (1940–41)	6–15–7
29	L	January 24, 1941	2–4 OT	@ Detroit Red Wings (1940–41)	6–16–7
30	L	January 26, 1941	1–6	Boston Bruins (1940–41)	6–17–7
31	W	January 30, 1941	5–4	Chicago Black Hawks (1940–41)	7–17–7

February

Game	Result	Date	Score	Opponent	Record
32	L	February 2, 1941	1–4	@ Boston Bruins (1940–41)	7–18–7
33	T	February 4, 1941	2–2 OT	New York Rangers (1940–41)	7–18–8
34	T	February 8, 1941	3–3 OT	@ Montreal Canadiens (1940–41)	7–18–9
35	W	February 9, 1941	6–3 OT	Montreal Canadiens (1940–41)	8–18–9
36	L	February 16, 1941	4–5 OT	@ Chicago Black Hawks (1940–41)	8–19–9
37	L	February 18, 1941	2–5	New York Rangers (1940–41)	8–20–9
38	L	February 20, 1941	2–4	Chicago Black Hawks (1940–41)	8–21–9
39	L	February 23, 1941	1–3	@ Boston Bruins (1940–41)	8–22–9
40	T	February 25, 1941	4–4 OT	Toronto Maple Leafs (1940–41)	8–22–10
41	L	February 28, 1941	4–5	@ Detroit Red Wings (1940–41)	8–23–10

March

Game	Result	Date	Score	Opponent	Record
42	L	March 2, 1941	2–3	Montreal Canadiens (1940–41)	8–24–10
43	L	March 6, 1941	1–6	Detroit Red Wings (1940–41)	8–25–10
44	L	March 8, 1941	1–6	@ Toronto Maple Leafs (1940–41)	8–26–10
45	T	March 9, 1941	2–2 OT	@ Chicago Black Hawks (1940–41)	8–26–11
46	L	March 13, 1941	3–8	Boston Bruins (1940–41)	8–27–11
47	L	March 15, 1941	0–6	@ Montreal Canadiens (1940–41)	8–28–11
48	L	March 16, 1941	3–6	@ New York Rangers (1940–41)	8–29–11

Legend: Win (2 points) Loss (0 points) Tie (1 point)

== Player statistics ==
=== Regular season ===
Scoring

Player	GP	G	A	Pts	PIM
Lorne Carr	48	13	19	32	10
Buzz Boll	47	12	14	26	16
Busher Jackson	46	8	18	26	4
Murray Armstrong	48	10	14	24	6
Charlie Conacher	46	7	16	23	32
Norm Larson	48	9	9	18	6
Tommy Anderson	35	3	12	15	8
Pat Egan	39	4	9	13	51
Wilf Field	36	5	6	11	31
Ralph Wycherley	26	4	5	9	4
Hooley Smith	41	2	7	9	4
Pete Kelly	11	3	5	8	2
John Sorrell	30	2	6	8	2
Bill Benson	22	3	4	7	4
Fred Hunt	15	2	5	7	0
Peter Slobodian	41	3	2	5	54
Peanuts O'Flaherty	10	4	0	4	0
Chuck Corrigan	16	2	2	4	2
Fred Thurier	3	2	1	3	0
Andy Branigan	6	1	0	1	5
Viv Allen	6	0	1	1	0
Lloyd Finkbeiner	2	0	0	0	0
Chuck Rayner	12	0	0	0	0
Earl Robertson	36	0	0	0	0
Jack Tomson	3	0	0	0	0

Goaltending

Player	MIN	GP	W	L	T	GA	GAA	SA	SV	SV%	SO
Earl Robertson	2260	36	6	22	8	142	3.77				1
Chuck Rayner	773	12	2	7	3	44	3.42				0
Andy Branigan	7	1	0	0	0	0	0.00				0
Team:	3040	48	8	29	11	186	3.67				1

== See also ==
- 1940–41 NHL season
