= 1940–41 New York Rangers season =

NHL hockey team season

1940–41 New York Rangers
- League: 4th NHL
- 1940–41 record: 21–19–8
- Home record: 13–7–4
- Road record: 8–12–4
- Goals for: 143
- Goals against: 125

Team information
- General manager: Lester Patrick
- Coach: Frank Boucher
- Captain: Art Coulter
- Arena: Madison Square Garden

Team leaders
- Goals: Bryan Hextall (26)
- Assists: Neil Colville (28)
- Points: Bryan Hextall/Lynn Patrick (44)
- Penalty minutes: Babe Pratt (52)
- Wins: Dave Kerr (21)
- Goals against average: Dave Kerr (2.49)

The 1940–41 New York Rangers season was the franchise's 15th season. During the regular season, the Rangers finished in fourth place in the NHL with 50 points and qualified for the playoffs. In the first round of the playoffs, New York lost to the Detroit Red Wings, two games to one.

== Regular season ==
=== Final standings ===
National Hockey League
	GP	W	L	T	Pts	GF	GA
**Boston Bruins**	48	27	8	13	67	168	102
**Toronto Maple Leafs**	48	28	14	6	62	145	99
**Detroit Red Wings**	48	21	16	11	53	112	102
**New York Rangers**	48	21	19	8	50	143	125
**Chicago Black Hawks**	48	16	25	7	39	112	139
**Montreal Canadiens**	48	16	26	6	38	121	147
New York Americans	48	8	29	11	27	99	186

Note: GP = Games played, W = Wins, L = Losses, T = Ties, Pts = Points, GF = Goals for, GA = Goals against
Teams that qualified for the playoffs are highlighted in bold.

=== Record vs. opponents ===
1940–41 NHL Records
Team	BOS	CHI	DET	MTL	NYA	NYR	TOR
Boston	—	4–2–2	3–0–5	5–2–1	7–0–1	4–2–2	4–2–2
Chicago	2–4–2	—	2–6	3–4–1	3–2–3	4–3–1	2–6
Detroit	0–3–5	6–2	—	4–3–1	5–1–2	3–2–3	3–5
Montreal	2–5–1	4–3–1	3–4–1	—	4–3–1	2–5–1	1–6–1
N.Y. Americans	0–7–1	2–3–3	1–5–2	3–4–1	—	1–6–1	1–4–3
N.Y. Rangers	2–4–2	3–4–1	2–3–2	5–2–1	6–1–1	—	3–5
Toronto	2–4–2	6–2	5–3	6–1–1	4–1–3	5–3	—

== Schedule and results ==
1940–41 regular season
November: 3–3–2 (home: 2–2–1; road: 1–1–1)

Game	November	Opponent	Score	Record
1	2	@ Toronto Maple Leafs	4–1	1–0–0
2	10	@ Detroit Red Wings	2 – 2 OT	1–0–1
3	16	Detroit Red Wings	3 – 3 OT	1–0–2
4	19	New York Americans	3–2	2–0–2
5	23	Boston Bruins	2–1	2–1–2
6	26	Toronto Maple Leafs	4–2	2–2–2
7	28	@ New York Americans	2–1	2–3–2
8	30	Montreal Canadiens	6–1	3–3–2

December: 4–6–2 (home: 3–1–1; road: 1–5–1)

Game	December	Opponent	Score	Record
9	1	@ Chicago Black Hawks	4–1	3–4–2
10	5	@ Montreal Canadiens	3–2	4–4–2
11	8	Detroit Red Wings	3–1	4–5–2
12	10	@ Boston Bruins	6–2	4–6–2
13	13	@ Detroit Red Wings	3 – 2 OT	4–7–2
14	15	New York Americans	6–3	5–7–2
15	19	Boston Bruins	5–3	6–7–2
16	22	@ Chicago Black Hawks	3 – 1 OT	6–8–2
17	25	Chicago Black Hawks	3 – 3 OT	6–8–3
18	28	@ Toronto Maple Leafs	3–2	6–9–3
19	29	Toronto Maple Leafs	3–2	7–9–3
20	31	@ Boston Bruins	2 – 2 OT	7–9–4

January: 3–5–3 (home: 1–2–2; road: 2–3–1)

Game	January	Opponent	Score	Record
21	1	Montreal Canadiens	2–1	7–10–4
22	4	@ Montreal Canadiens	3 – 3 OT	7–10–5
23	5	@ New York Americans	6–2	8–10–5
24	7	Chicago Black Hawks	3–2	8–11–5
25	9	@ Toronto Maple Leafs	3 – 2 OT	8–12–5
26	12	New York Americans	3–1	9–12–5
27	14	Detroit Red Wings	3 – 3 OT	9–12–6
28	16	Boston Bruins	2 – 2 OT	9–12–7
29	19	@ Detroit Red Wings	2–1	10–12–7
30	21	@ Boston Bruins	4 – 3 OT	10–13–7
31	26	@ Chicago Black Hawks	4–1	10–14–7

February: 7–4–1 (home: 4–2–0; road: 3–2–1)

Game	February	Opponent	Score	Record
32	2	Montreal Canadiens	2–1	11–14–7
33	4	@ New York Americans	2 – 2 OT	11–14–8
34	6	Chicago Black Hawks	6–2	12–14–8
35	9	@ Chicago Black Hawks	2–1	13–14–8
36	11	@ Montreal Canadiens	6–2	13–15–8
37	13	Boston Bruins	5–3	13–16–8
38	15	@ Toronto Maple Leafs	4–3	13–17–8
39	16	Toronto Maple Leafs	4–1	13–18–8
40	18	@ New York Americans	5–2	14–18–8
41	23	Chicago Black Hawks	4–1	15–18–8
42	25	@ Boston Bruins	2–0	16–18–8
43	27	Montreal Canadiens	5–2	17–18–8

March: 4–1–0 (home: 3–0–0; road: 1–1–0)

Game	March	Opponent	Score	Record
44	1	@ Montreal Canadiens	3–1	18–18–8
45	2	@ Detroit Red Wings	4 – 2 OT	18–19–8
46	4	Detroit Red Wings	6–0	19–19–8
47	9	Toronto Maple Leafs	8–5	20–19–8
48	16	New York Americans	6–3	21–19–8

Legend: Win (2 points) Loss (0 points) Tie (1 point)

== Playoffs ==
1941 Stanley Cup playoffs
Quarterfinals vs. (3) Detroit Red Wings – Detroit wins 2–1

Game	Date	Visitor	Score	Home	OT	Series
1	March 20	New York Rangers	1–2	Detroit Red Wings	OT	Detroit leads series 1–0
2	March 22	Detroit Red Wings	1–3	New York Rangers		Series tied 1–1
3	March 24	New York Rangers	2–3	Detroit Red Wings		Detroit wins series 2–1

Legend: Win Loss

== Player statistics ==
Skaters

Regular season
Player	GP	G	A	Pts	PIM
Bryan Hextall	48	26	18	44	16
Lynn Patrick	48	20	24	44	12
Neil Colville	48	14	28	42	28
Phil Watson	40	11	25	36	49
Mac Colville	47	14	17	31	18
Clint Smith	48	14	11	25	0
Alex Shibicky	40	10	14	24	14
Walter Pratt	47	3	17	20	52
Alf Pike	48	6	13	19	23
Arthur Coulter	35	5	14	19	42
Wilbert Hiller	45	8	10	18	20
Ehrhardt Heller	48	2	16	18	42
James MacDonald	47	5	6	11	12
Murray Patrick	47	2	8	10	21
Stanford Smith	8	2	1	3	0
Herb Foster	4	1	0	1	5
Bill Allum	1	0	1	1	0
John Polich	2	0	1	1	0
Bill Juzda	5	0	0	0	2

Playoffs
Player	GP	G	A	Pts	PIM
Walter Pratt	3	1	1	2	6
Mac Colville	3	1	1	2	2
Phil Watson	3	0	2	2	9
Neil Colville	3	1	1	2	0
James MacDonald	3	1	0	1	0
Ehrhardt Heller	3	0	1	1	4
Alf Pike	3	0	1	1	2
Alex Shibicky	3	1	0	1	2
Lynn Patrick	3	1	0	1	14
Bryan Hextall	3	0	1	1	0
Murray Patrick	3	0	0	0	2
Wilbert Hiller	3	0	0	0	0
Arthur Coulter	3	0	0	0	14
Clint Smith	3	0	0	0	0

Goaltenders

Regular season
Player	GP	TOI	W	L	T	GA	GAA	SO
Dave Kerr	48	3010	21	19	8	125	2.49	2

Playoffs
Player	GP	TOI	W	L	GA	GAA	SO
Dave Kerr	3	192	1	2	6	1.88	0

^{†}Denotes player spent time with another team before joining Rangers. Stats reflect time with Rangers only.
^{‡}Traded mid-season. Stats reflect time with Rangers only.

Note:

Pos = Position;GP = Games played; G = Goals; A = Assists; Pts = Points; PIM = Penalty minutes; +/- = Plus/minus; PPG = Power-play goals; SHG = Short-handed goals; GWG = Game-winning goals
Pos = Position;GP = Games played; Min, TOI = Minutes played; W = Wins; L = Losses; T,T/OT = Ties; OTL = Overtime losses; GA = Goals-against; GAA = Goals-against average; SO = Shutouts; SA = Shots against; SV = Shots saved;SV% = Save percentage;

== See also ==
- 1940–41 NHL season
