= Brian Smith (ice hockey, born 1937) =

Canadian ice hockey player (1937–2026)

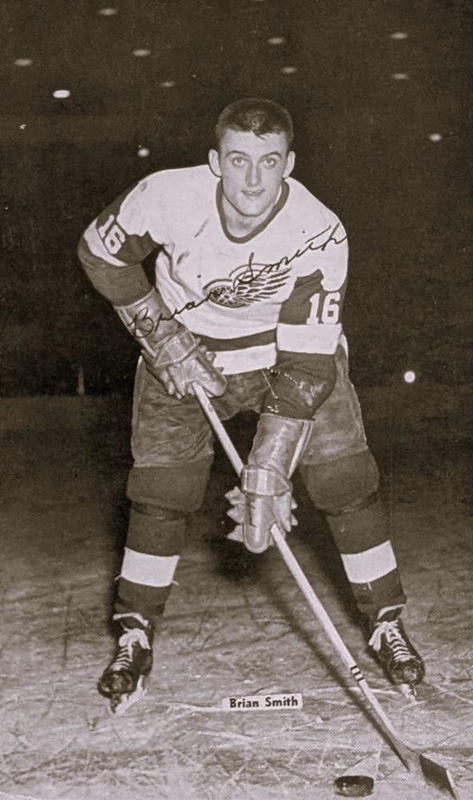
- Born: December 6, 1937 Creighton Mine, Ontario, Canada
- Died: October 28, 2026 (aged 88)
- Height: 5 ft 11 in (180 cm)
- Weight: 178 lb (81 kg; 12 st 10 lb)
- Position: Left wing
- Shot: Left
- Played for: Detroit Red Wings
- Playing career: 1958–1969

Brian Stuart Smith (December 6, 1937 – October 28, 2026) was a Canadian professional ice hockey player who played 61 games in the National Hockey League with the Detroit Red Wings between 1958 and 1960. The rest of his career, which lasted from 1958 to 1969, was spent in the minor leagues. He is the son of former NHL hockey player, Stuart Ernest Smith. Smith died on October 28, 2026, at the age of 88.

== Career statistics ==
=== Regular season and playoffs ===
			Regular season					Playoffs
Season	Team	League	GP	G	A	Pts	PIM	GP	G	A	Pts	PIM
1954–55	Hamilton Tiger Cubs	OHA	33	7	3	10	14	3	0	1	1	7
1955–56	Hamilton Tiger Cubs	OHA	41	20	17	37	24	—	—	—	—	—
1956–57	Hamilton Tiger Cubs	OHA	52	27	23	50	32	4	1	0	1	0
1957–58	Hamilton Tiger Cubs	OHA	50	24	17	41	65	13	6	2	8	29
1957–58	Detroit Red Wings	NHL	4	0	1	1	0	—	—	—	—	—
1958–59	Edmonton Flyers	WHL	20	4	4	8	12	—	—	—	—	—
1959–60	Detroit Red Wings	NHL	31	2	5	7	2	5	0	0	0	0
1959–60	Hershey Bears	AHL	34	13	9	22	29	—	—	—	—	—
1960–61	Detroit Red Wings	NHL	26	0	2	2	10	—	—	—	—	—
1960–61	Edmonton Flyers	WHL	11	5	3	8	2	—	—	—	—	—
1960–61	Hershey Bears	AHL	31	6	14	20	17	8	1	0	1	2
1961–62	Buffalo Bisons	AHL	58	10	18	28	14	11	1	0	1	0
1962–63	Buffalo Bisons	AHL	65	15	21	36	16	13	2	3	5	9
1963–64	Buffalo Bisons	AHL	58	6	3	9	13	—	—	—	—	—
1964–65	Los Angeles Blades	WHL	69	35	28	65	38	—	—	—	—	—
1965–66	Los Angeles Blades	WHL	71	19	20	39	16	—	—	—	—	—
1966–67	Buffalo Bisons	AHL	60	15	17	32	30	—	—	—	—	—
1967–68	Phoenix Roadrunners	WHL	52	11	12	33	5	—	—	—	—	—
1968–69	Jacksonville Rockets	EHL	21	7	8	15	0	—	—	—	—	—
AHL totals			306	65	82	147	119	32	4	3	7	11
WHL totals			223	74	67	141	73	—	—	—	—	—
NHL totals			61	2	8	10	12	5	0	0	0	0
