= 1940–41 Boston Bruins season =

NHL team season

1940–41 Boston Bruins
- Stanley Cup champions
- Prince of Wales Trophy winners
- League: 1st NHL
- 1940–41 record: 27–8–13
- Home record: 15–4–5
- Road record: 12–4–8
- Goals for: 168 (1st)
- Goals against: 102 (T-2nd)

Team information
- General manager: Art Ross
- Coach: Cooney Weiland
- Captain: Dit Clapper
- Arena: Boston Garden

Team leaders
- Goals: Roy Conacher (24)
- Assists: Bill Cowley (45)
- Points: Bill Cowley (62)
- Penalty minutes: Des Smith (61)
- Wins: Frank Brimsek (27)
- Goals against average: Frank Brimsek (2.01)

The 1940–41 Boston Bruins season was the Bruins' 17th season in the National Hockey League, and they were coming off of a successful season in 1939–40, leading the NHL in points for the third season in a row, as they finished with a 31–12–5 record, accumulating 67 points. However, the Bruins lost to the New York Rangers in the NHL semifinals, ending their chances for a second-straight Stanley Cup. This year, the Bruins repeated as regular season champions and returned to the Stanley Cup Final, defeating the Detroit Red Wings four games to none to win the organization's third Stanley Cup.

== Regular season ==
Boston would have a slow start to the season, going winless in their first 4 games (0–2–2), and sat with a 6–7–3 record 16 games into the season, fighting with the Chicago Black Hawks and New York Americans for 3rd place in the league. The Bruins would then go on a record breaking unbeaten streak, as they would have a 15–0–8 record in their next 23 games, and sit in 2nd place to the Toronto Maple Leafs. After a 2–0 loss to the New York Rangers, Boston would finish the season 6–0–2 to pass the Leafs, and finish with the most points in the NHL for the 4th straight year. Boston had an amazing 21–1–10 record to close out the season.

Bill Cowley would lead the NHL in scoring with 62 points, as he scored 17 goals and added 45 assists. Roy Conacher led the Bruins in goals with 24, and added 14 assists for a career high 38 points. Eddie Wiseman and Bobby Bauer had productive seasons, earning 40 and 39 points respectively, while Milt Schmidt finished with 38. Team captain Dit Clapper led the Boston blueline with 26 points, while Flash Hollett led the Bruins defense with 9 goals.

In goal, Frank Brimsek had another outstanding season, winning 27 games, while earning 6 shutouts and posting a 2.01 GAA.

=== Final standings ===
National Hockey League
	GP	W	L	T	Pts	GF	GA
**Boston Bruins**	48	27	8	13	67	168	102
**Toronto Maple Leafs**	48	28	14	6	62	145	99
**Detroit Red Wings**	48	21	16	11	53	112	102
**New York Rangers**	48	21	19	8	50	143	125
**Chicago Black Hawks**	48	16	25	7	39	112	139
**Montreal Canadiens**	48	16	26	6	38	121	147
New York Americans	48	8	29	11	27	99	186

Note: GP = Games played, W = Wins, L = Losses, T = Ties, Pts = Points, GF = Goals for, GA = Goals against
Teams that qualified for the playoffs are highlighted in bold.

=== Record vs. opponents ===
1940–41 NHL Records
Team	BOS	CHI	DET	MTL	NYA	NYR	TOR
Boston	—	4–2–2	3–0–5	5–2–1	7–0–1	4–2–2	4–2–2
Chicago	2–4–2	—	2–6	3–4–1	3–2–3	4–3–1	2–6
Detroit	0–3–5	6–2	—	4–3–1	5–1–2	3–2–3	3–5
Montreal	2–5–1	4–3–1	3–4–1	—	4–3–1	2–5–1	1–6–1
N.Y. Americans	0–7–1	2–3–3	1–5–2	3–4–1	—	1–6–1	1–4–3
N.Y. Rangers	2–4–2	3–4–1	2–3–2	5–2–1	6–1–1	—	3–5
Toronto	2–4–2	6–2	5–3	6–1–1	4–1–3	5–3	—

== Schedule and results ==
1940–41 regular season
November

Game	Date	Visitor	Score	Home	Record	Pts
1	November 3	Boston Bruins	1–1	Montreal Canadiens	0–0–1	1
2	November 12	Chicago Black Hawks	6–5	Boston Bruins	0–1–1	1
3	November 17	Toronto Maple Leafs	4–1	Boston Bruins	0–2–1	1
4	November 19	Detroit Red Wings	4–4	Boston Bruins	0–2–2	2
5	November 21	Boston Bruins	2–0	Chicago Black Hawks	1–2–2	4
6	November 23	Boston Bruins	2–1	New York Rangers	2–2–2	6
7	November 24	Boston Bruins	1–1	Detroit Red Wings	2–2–3	7
8	November 26	Montreal Canadiens	3–2	Boston Bruins	2–3–3	7

December

Game	Date	Visitor	Score	Home	Record	Pts
9	December 1	Boston Bruins	10–3	New York Americans	3–3–3	9
10	December 3	New York Americans	2–6	Boston Bruins	4–3–3	11
11	December 7	Boston Bruins	2–3	Toronto Maple Leafs	4–4–3	11
12	December 8	Boston Bruins	2–3	Chicago Black Hawks	4–5–3	11
13	December 10	New York Rangers	2–6	Boston Bruins	5–5–3	13
14	December 17	Toronto Maple Leafs	2–5	Boston Bruins	6–5–3	15
15	December 19	Boston Bruins	3–5	New York Rangers	6–6–3	15
16	December 21	Boston Bruins	1–3	Montreal Canadiens	6–7–3	15
17	December 22	Boston Bruins	5–3	Detroit Red Wings	7–7–3	17
18	December 25	New York Americans	1–8	Boston Bruins	8–7–3	19
19	December 27	Boston Bruins	3–3	New York Americans	8–7–4	20
20	December 31	New York Rangers	2–2	Boston Bruins	8–7–5	21

January

Game	Date	Visitor	Score	Home	Record	Pts
21	January 5	Chicago Black Hawks	2–2	Boston Bruins	8–7–6	22
22	January 7	Detroit Red Wings	1–1	Boston Bruins	8–7–7	23
23	January 11	Boston Bruins	2–1	Montreal Canadiens	9–7–7	25
24	January 12	Montreal Canadiens	5–7	Boston Bruins	10–7–7	27
25	January 16	Boston Bruins	2–2	New York Rangers	10–7–8	28
26	January 18	Boston Bruins	1–0	Toronto Maple Leafs	11–7–8	30
27	January 19	Boston Bruins	4–4	Chicago Black Hawks	11–7–9	31
28	January 21	New York Rangers	3–4	Boston Bruins	12–7–9	33
29	January 26	Boston Bruins	6–1	New York Americans	13–7–9	35
30	January 28	Chicago Black Hawks	2–3	Boston Bruins	14–7–9	37

February

Game	Date	Visitor	Score	Home	Record	Pts
31	February 2	New York Americans	1–4	Boston Bruins	15–7–9	39
32	February 4	Montreal Canadiens	3–5	Boston Bruins	16–7–9	41
33	February 8	Boston Bruins	3–2	Toronto Maple Leafs	17–7–9	43
34	February 9	Boston Bruins	2–2	Detroit Red Wings	17–7–10	44
35	February 11	Detroit Red Wings	0–4	Boston Bruins	18–7–10	46
36	February 13	New York Rangers	3–5	Boston Bruins	19–7–10	48
37	February 15	Boston Bruins	5–0	Montreal Canadiens	20–7–10	50
38	February 18	Toronto Maple Leafs	2–2	Boston Bruins	20–7–11	51
39	February 23	New York Americans	1–3	Boston Bruins	21–7–11	53
40	February 25	New York Rangers	2–0	Boston Bruins	21–8–11	53

March

Game	Date	Visitor	Score	Home	Record	Pts
41	March 1	Boston Bruins	0–0	Toronto Maple Leafs	21–8–12	54
42	March 2	Boston Bruins	4–3	Chicago Black Hawks	22–8–12	56
43	March 4	Chicago Black Hawks	2–3	Boston Bruins	23–8–12	58
44	March 9	Montreal Canadiens	0–8	Boston Bruins	24–8–12	60
45	March 11	Toronto Maple Leafs	2–3	Boston Bruins	25–8–12	62
46	March 13	Boston Bruins	8–3	New York Americans	26–8–12	64
47	March 16	Boston Bruins	2–2	Detroit Red Wings	26–8–13	65
48	March 18	Detroit Red Wings	1–4	Boston Bruins	27–8–13	67

Legend: Win (2 points) Loss (0 points) Tie (1 point)

== Playoffs ==
In the playoffs, Boston would have a first-round bye, advancing straight to the NHL semi-finals, where they would face the second place Toronto Maple Leafs in a best of seven series. The Bruins finished 5 points ahead of the Leafs during the regular season. The series opened at the Boston Garden, with each team winning a game, before moving to Maple Leaf Gardens for games three and four. The Leafs took a 2–1 series lead with a big 7–2 victory, however, Boston evened the series up at two games each with a solid 2–1 win in game four. Game 5 shifted back to Boston, but it was Toronto who took a 3–2 series lead, with a 2–1 overtime victory. The series moved back to Toronto for the 6th game, and with Boston facing elimination, the Bruins would hold off the Leafs for a 2–1 win to force a 7th and deciding game in Boston. The Bruins once again would fend off Toronto, hanging on for a 2–1 win, to take the series 4–3, and earn a spot in the Stanley Cup Final.

The Bruins opponent was the Detroit Red Wings, who finished the regular season with 53 points, 14 less than Boston. Detroit had defeated the New York Rangers and Chicago Black Hawks to earn a spot in the final. The series opened in Boston, with the Bruins winning the first 2 games by close scores of 3–2 and 2–1 to take a 2–0 series lead. The series moved to the Detroit Olympia for the next 2 games, but Boston would complete the sweep, winning games 3 and 4 by scores of 4–2 and 3–1 to become the first team in NHL history to sweep a 4-game series, and win their 2nd Stanley Cup in 3 seasons, and their 3rd in franchise history. It was also the last time the Bruins would win the Stanley Cup until 1970.

1941 Stanley Cup playoffs
Semifinals vs. (2) Toronto Maple Leafs – Bruins win 4–3

Game	Date	Visitor	Score	Home	Series
1	March 20	Toronto Maple Leafs	0–3	Boston Bruins	1–0
2	March 22	Toronto Maple Leafs	5–3	Boston Bruins	1–1
3	March 25	Boston Bruins	2–7	Toronto Maple Leafs	1–2
4	March 27	Boston Bruins	2–1	Toronto Maple Leafs	2–2
5	March 29	Toronto Maple Leafs	2–1	Boston Bruins	2–3
6	April 1	Boston Bruins	2–1	Toronto Maple Leafs	3–3
7	April 3	Toronto Maple Leafs	1–2	Boston Bruins	4–3

Stanley Cup Finals vs. (3) Detroit Red Wings – Bruins win 4–0

Game	Date	Visitor	Score	Home	Series
1	April 6	Detroit Red Wings	2–3	Boston Bruins	1–0
2	April 8	Detroit Red Wings	1–2	Boston Bruins	2–0
3	April 10	Boston Bruins	4–2	Detroit Red Wings	3–0
4	April 12	Boston Bruins	3–1	Detroit Red Wings	4–0

Legend: Win Loss

== Player statistics ==
=== Regular season ===
Scoring

Player	Pos	GP	G	A	Pts	PIM
Bill Cowley	C	46	17	45	62	16
Eddie Wiseman	RW	48	16	24	40	10
Bobby Bauer	RW	48	17	22	39	2
Roy Conacher	LW	41	24	14	38	7
Milt Schmidt	C/D	45	13	25	38	23
Woody Dumart	LW	40	18	15	33	2
Art Jackson	C	48	17	15	32	10
Dit Clapper	RW/D	48	8	18	26	24
Flash Hollett	D	41	9	15	24	23
Herb Cain	LW	41	8	10	18	6
Des Smith	D	48	6	8	14	61
Terry Reardon	C/RW	34	6	5	11	19
Jack Crawford	D	45	2	8	10	27
Mel Hill	RW	41	5	4	9	4
Jack Shewchuk	D	20	2	2	4	8
Gordie Bruce	LW	8	0	1	1	2
Red Hamill	LW	8	0	1	1	0
Pat McReavy	C	7	0	1	1	2
Frank Brimsek	G	48	0	0	0	0

Goaltending

Player	MIN	GP	W	L	T	GA	GAA	SO
Frank Brimsek	3040	48	27	8	13	102	2.01	6
Team:	3040	48	27	8	13	102	2.01	6

=== Playoffs ===
Scoring

Player	Pos	GP	G	A	Pts	PIM
Milt Schmidt	C/D	11	5	6	11	9
Eddie Wiseman	RW	11	6	2	8	0
Flash Hollett	D	11	3	4	7	8
Terry Reardon	C/RW	11	2	4	6	6
Roy Conacher	LW	11	1	5	6	0
Herb Cain	LW	11	3	2	5	5
Dit Clapper	RW/D	11	0	5	5	4
Bobby Bauer	RW	11	2	2	4	0
Pat McReavy	C	11	2	2	4	5
Woody Dumart	LW	11	1	3	4	9
Art Jackson	C	11	1	3	4	16
Mel Hill	RW	8	1	1	2	0
Jack Crawford	D	11	0	2	2	7
Des Smith	D	11	0	2	2	12
Frank Brimsek	G	11	0	0	0	0
Gordie Bruce	LW	2	0	0	0	0
Bill Cowley	C	2	0	0	0	0

Goaltending

Player	MIN	GP	W	L	GA	GAA	SO
Frank Brimsek	678	11	8	3	23	2.04	1
Team:	678	11	8	3	23	2.04	1

Note:

Pos = Position;GP = Games played; G = Goals; A = Assists; Pts = Points; PIM = Penalty minutes; +/- = Plus/minus; PPG = Power-play goals; SHG = Short-handed goals; GWG = Game-winning goals
Pos = Position;GP = Games played; Min, TOI = Minutes played; W = Wins; L = Losses; T,T/OT = Ties; OTL = Overtime losses; GA = Goals-against; GAA = Goals-against average; SO = Shutouts; SA = Shots against; SV = Shots saved;SV% = Save percentage;

== Awards and records ==
- Prince of Wales Trophy: Boston Bruins
- Hart Memorial Trophy: Bill Cowley
- Lady Byng Memorial Trophy: Bobby Bauer
- Frank Brimsek, Goaltender, NHL Second Team All-Star
- Bobby Bauer, Right wing, NHL Second Team All-Star
- Woody Dumart, Left wing, NHL Second Team All-Star
- Dit Clapper, Defence, NHL First Team All-Star
- Bill Cowley, Centre, NHL First Team All-Star
- Cooney Weiland, Coach, NHL First Team All-Star
