= Alex Singbush =

Canadian ice hockey player (1914–1969)

- Born: January 31, 1914 Winnipeg, Manitoba, Canada
- Died: March 8, 1969 (aged 55) Sudbury, Ontario, Canada
- Height: 5 ft 11 in (180 cm)
- Weight: 180 lb (82 kg; 12 st 12 lb)
- Position: Defence
- Shot: Left
- Played for: Montreal Canadiens
- Playing career: 1934–1946

Alexander Edward Singbush (January 31, 1914 – March 8, 1969) was a Canadian professional ice hockey defenceman who played 32 games in the National Hockey League for the Montreal Canadiens during the 1940–41 season. The rest of his career, which lasted from 1934 to 1946, was spent in the minor leagues. He was born in Winnipeg, Manitoba, but moved to Sudbury, Ontario in the mid 1930s to find work. He played in both the NHL and AHL and returned to Sudbury in the early 1940s to work at INCO (International Nickel Corporation). He played many sports in the local leagues in Sudbury and Northern Ontario at that time. At the end of the war, he began to work for the Canadian Pacific Railway as a fireman and then an engineer. He was married to Elizabeth Francis Mulligan and they had four children. Singbush died in 1969 in Sudbury.

== Career statistics ==
=== Regular season and playoffs ===
| | | | Regular season | | | | | Playoffs |
| Season | Team | League | GP | G | A | Pts | PIM | GP | G | A | Pts | PIM |
|---|---|---|---|---|---|---|---|---|---|---|---|---|
| 1932–33 | Winnipeg K of C | WDJHL | 6 | 0 | 0 | 0 | 2 | 2 | 0 | 0 | 0 | 0 |
| 1933–34 | Portage Terriers | MJHL | 14 | 5 | 7 | 12 | 48 | 2 | 0 | 0 | 0 | 4 |
| 1934–35 | Sudbury Refinery ORC | NBHL | 6 | 1 | 1 | 2 | 18 | — | — | — | — | — |
| 1935–36 | Sudbury Refinery ORC | NBHL | 9 | 3 | 4 | 7 | 26 | — | — | — | — | — |
| 1936–37 | Sudbury Refinery ORC | NBHL | 17 | 4 | 6 | 10 | 64 | — | — | — | — | — |
| 1937–38 | New Haven Eagles | IAHL | 43 | 4 | 3 | 7 | 44 | — | — | — | — | — |
| 1938–39 | New Haven Eagles | IAHL | 18 | 0 | 0 | 0 | 25 | — | — | — | — | — |
| 1938–39 | Philadelphia Ramblers | IAHL | 38 | 2 | 1 | 3 | 52 | 9 | 0 | 1 | 1 | 6 |
| 1939–40 | New Haven Eagles | IAHL | 54 | 12 | 14 | 26 | 76 | 3 | 0 | 0 | 0 | 2 |
| 1940–41 | Montreal Canadiens | NHL | 32 | 0 | 5 | 5 | 15 | 3 | 0 | 0 | 0 | 4 |
| 1940–41 | New Haven Eagles | AHL | 8 | 0 | 2 | 2 | 2 | — | — | — | — | — |
| 1941–42 | Washington Lions | AHL | 55 | 6 | 7 | 13 | 50 | 2 | 0 | 0 | 0 | 4 |
| 1942–43 | Washington Lions | AHL | 11 | 1 | 5 | 6 | 31 | — | — | — | — | — |
| 1942–43 | Providence Reds | AHL | 35 | 6 | 6 | 12 | 32 | 2 | 0 | 0 | 0 | 0 |
| 1943–44 | Sudbury Open Pit Miners | NBHL | 8 | 1 | 0 | 1 | 6 | — | — | — | — | — |
| 1943–44 | Sudbury Open Pit Miners | Al-Cup | — | — | — | — | — | 16 | 4 | 5 | 9 | 30 |
| 1944–45 | Sudbury Open Pit Miners | NBHL | 8 | 0 | 4 | 4 | 2 | 7 | 0 | 0 | 0 | 10 |
| 1945–46 | North Bay CPR | NOHA | — | — | — | — | — | — | — | — | — | — |
| 1945–46 | Hull Volants | QSHL | 5 | 0 | 0 | 0 | 4 | — | — | — | — | — |
| 1945–46 | Providence Reds | AHL | 1 | 0 | 0 | 0 | 0 | — | — | — | — | — |
| IAHL/AHL totals | | | 263 | 31 | 38 | 69 | 312 | 16 | 0 | 1 | 1 | 12 |
| NHL totals | | | 32 | 0 | 5 | 5 | 15 | 3 | 0 | 0 | 0 | 4 |
