= Tony Demers =

Canadian ice hockey player

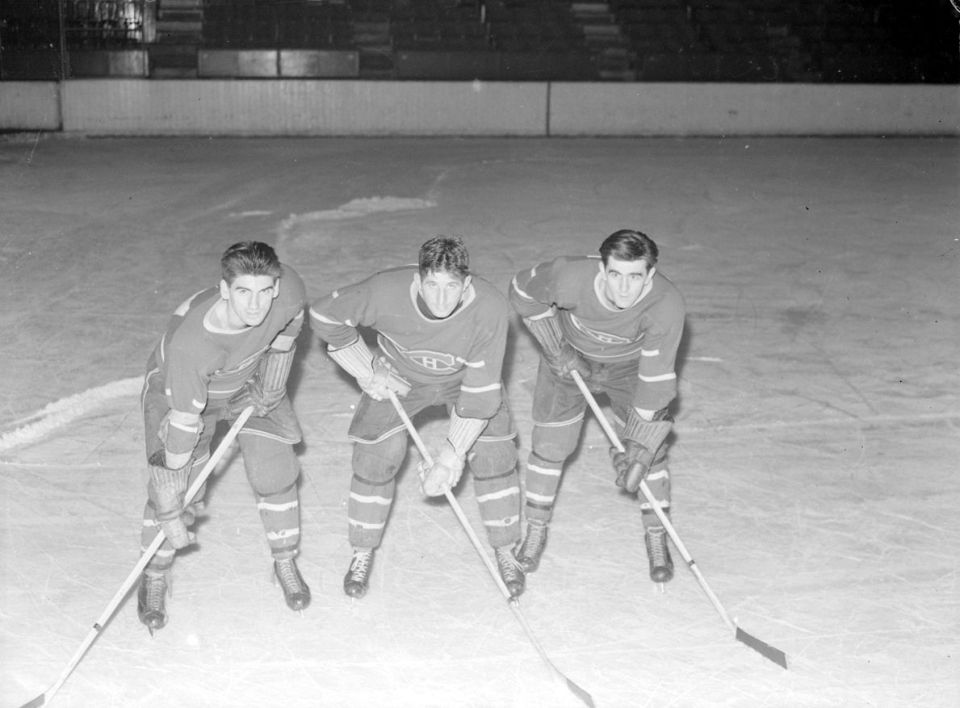
- The Broken Bone Line : Maurice Richard, Elmer Lach and Tony Demers in 1942
- Born: July 22, 1917 Chambly-Basin, Quebec, Canada
- Died: September 3, 1997 (aged 80)
- Height: 5 ft 9 in (175 cm)
- Weight: 180 lb (82 kg; 12 st 12 lb)
- Position: Right wing
- Shot: Right
- Played for: Southampton Vikings; Montreal Canadiens; New York Rangers
- Playing career: 1936–1949

Joseph Antonio Demers (July 22, 1917 – September 3, 1997) was a Canadian professional ice hockey forward who played 83 games in the National Hockey League for the Montreal Canadiens and New York Rangers from 1938 to 1944. He was born in Chambly-Basin, Quebec. He started with the Canadiens in 1937–38 but had to wait until the 1940–41 season before playing a full season with the Montreal club. He only played 16 games in the two seasons that followed. In his last season with the Canadiens, he assisted on Maurice Richard's very first career goal.

In November 1949 he was convicted of manslaughter and sentenced to 15 years in prison. He had beaten a woman to death two months earlier at Coaticook, Quebec. He served his sentence and started his life again. He died in 1997 at the age of 80.

== Career statistics ==
=== Regular season and playoffs ===
			Regular season					Playoffs
Season	Team	League	GP	G	A	Pts	PIM	GP	G	A	Pts	PIM
1935–36	Montreal LaFontaine Bleus	MCJHL	1	1	0	1	2	—	—	—	—	—
1936–37	Southampton Vikings	ENL	—	21	7	28	16	—	—	—	—	—
1937–38	Montreal Canadiens	NHL	6	0	0	0	0	—	—	—	—	—
1937–38	New Haven Eagles	IAHL	5	0	0	0	0	2	0	0	0	0
1937–38	Lachine Rapides	QPHL	—	—	—	—	—	—	—	—	—	—
1938–39	Lachine Rapides	QPHL	29	24	12	36	39	6	2	2	4	7
1939–40	Montreal Canadiens	NHL	14	2	4	6	2	—	—	—	—	—
1939–40	Valleyfield Braves	QSHL	35	30	23	53	37	—	—	—	—	—
1940–41	Montreal Canadiens	NHL	46	13	10	23	17	2	0	0	0	)
1941–42	Montreal Canadiens	NHL	7	3	4	7	4	—	—	—	—	—
1941–42	Valleyfield V's	MDHL	14	2	3	5	16	9	1	2	3	21
1942–43	Montreal Canadiens	NHL	9	2	5	7	0	—	—	—	—	—
1942–43	Montreal Army	MCHL	13	3	1	4	0	4	0	2	2	0
1943–44	New York Rangers	NHL	1	0	0	0	0	—	—	—	—	—
1943–44	Providence Reds	AHL	25	11	10	21	10	—	—	—	—	—
1944–45	Lachine Rapides	QPHL	11	2	3	5	12	—	—	—	—	—
1945–46	St-Hyacinthe Saints	QPHL	34	50	29	79	26	—	—	—	—	—
1946–47	Sherbrooke Saints	QPHL	43	32	36	68	8	10	8	15	23	2
1946–47	Sherbrooke Saints	Al-Cup	—	—	—	—	—	4	2	2	4	2
1947–48	Sherbrooke Saints	QPHL	52	62	46	108	24	10	6	6	12	9
1948–49	Sherbrooke Saint-François	QPHL	60	53	58	111	29	10	10	2	12	8
NHL totals			83	20	23	43	23	2	0	0	0	0
