= Peter Slobodian =

Canadian ice hockey player

- Born: April 24, 1918; Dauphin, Manitoba, Canada
- Died: November 17, 1986 (aged 68)
- Height: 6 ft 1 in (185 cm)
- Weight: 182 lb (83 kg; 13 st 0 lb)
- Position: Defence
- Shot: Left
- Played for: New York Americans
- Playing career: 1938–1949

Peter Paul Slobodian (April 24, 1918 — November 17, 1986) was a Canadian professional ice hockey player who played 41 games in the National Hockey League for the New York Americans during the 1940–41 season. The rest of his career, which lasted from 1938 to 1949, was spent in the minor leagues. He was born in Dauphin, Manitoba.

== Career statistics ==
=== Regular season and playoffs ===
			Regular season					Playoffs
Season	Team	League	GP	G	A	Pts	PIM	GP	G	A	Pts	PIM
1936–37	Brandon Wheat Kings	MJHL	14	0	0	0	20	4	2	0	2	10
1937–38	Brandon Wheat Kings	MJHL	14	3	6	9	22	5	0	3	3	14
1938–39	Regina Aces	SSHL	30	5	5	10	74	—	—	—	—	—
1939–40	Regina Aces	SSHL	18	4	10	14	48	9	3	1	4	26
1940–41	New York Americans	NHL	41	3	2	5	56	—	—	—	—	—
1941–42	Lethbridge Maple Leafs	ABCSL	30	4	14	18	149	9	4	0	4	32
1941–42	Lethbridge Maple Leafs	Al-Cup	—	—	—	—	—	4	0	0	0	18
1942–43	Lethbridge Bombers	ASHL	20	8	6	14	83	2	0	1	1	6
1943–44	Calgary Combines	CNDHL	9	2	0	2	15	—	—	—	—	—
1944–45	Calgary RCAF	CNDHL	11	2	2	4	48	—	—	—	—	—
1945–46	Calgary Stampeders	WCSHL	—	—	—	—	—	5	0	1	1	16
1945–46	Calgary Stampeders	Al-Cup	—	—	—	—	—	13	0	0	0	14
1946–47	Hershey Bears	AHL	52	4	15	19	99	11	1	2	3	16
1947–48	Hershey Bears	AHL	54	2	8	10	105	2	0	1	1	6
1948–49	Lethbridge Maple Leafs	WCSHL	35	1	16	17	74	3	0	2	2	4
AHL totals			106	6	23	29	204	13	1	3	4	22
NHL totals			41	3	2	5	56	—	—	—	—	—
