= Lex Chisholm =

Canadian ice hockey player (1915–1981)

- Born: April 1, 1915; Galt, Ontario, Canada
- Died: August 6, 1981 (aged 66)
- Height: 5 ft 11 in (180 cm)
- Weight: 175 lb (79 kg; 12 st 7 lb)
- Position: Centre
- Shot: Right
- Played for: Toronto Maple Leafs
- Playing career: 1934–193

Andrew Alexander Chisholm (April 1, 1915 – August 6, 1981) was a Canadian ice hockey centre. He played 61 games in the National Hockey League with the Toronto Maple Leafs between 1939 and 1941. The rest of his career, which lasted from 1934 to 1943, was spent in the minor leagues. Chisholm was born in Galt, Ontario.

== Career statistics ==
=== Regular season and playoffs ===
			Regular season					Playoffs
Season	Team	League	GP	G	A	Pts	PIM	GP	G	A	Pts	PIM
1932–33	Galt Terrier Pups	OHA	14	14	1	15	22	2	0	0	0	6
1933–34	Galt Terrier Pups	OHA	16	11	14	25	23	2	1	1	2	2
1934–35	Oshawa Generals	OHA	12	14	5	19	17	—	—	—	—	—
1934–35	Oshawa Chevies	TIHL	1	0	0	0	0	—	—	—	—	—
1935–36	Oshawa Chevies	TIHL	12	2	5	7	19	—	—	—	—	—
1936–37	Oshawa G-Men	OHA Sr	9	1	0	1	4	—	—	—	—	—
1937–38	Oshawa G-Men	OHA Sr	13	9	10	19	10	2	1	0	1	4
1938–39	Syracuse Stars	IAHL	3	1	1	2	0	3	0	0	0	0
1938–39	Oshawa G-Men	OHA Sr	19	15	28	43	24	7	2	5	7	15
1939–40	Toronto Maple Leafs	NHL	31	6	8	14	22	—	—	—	—	—
1940–41	Toronto Maple Leafs	NHL	30	4	0	4	8	3	1	0	1	0
1940–41	Pittsburgh Hornets	AHL	2	0	1	1	2	—	—	—	—	—
1941–42	Halifax Army	NSDHL	—	—	—	—	—	—	—	—	—	—
1942–43	Toronto Army Daggers	OHA Sr	5	6	9	15	8	4	6	1	7	4
NHL totals			61	10	8	18	30	3	1	0	1	0
