= Stuart Ernest Smith =

Canadian ice hockey player

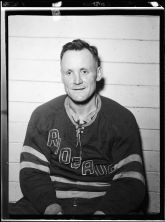
- Stu Smith in Rideaus jersey (1953)
- Born: September 25, 1915; Basswood, Manitoba, Canada
- Died: January 27, 2007 (aged 91); Lanark County, Ontario, Canada
- Height: 5 ft 8 in (173 cm)
- Weight: 163 lb (74 kg; 11 st 9 lb)
- Position: Left wing
- Shot: Left
- Played for: Montreal Canadiens
- Playing career: 1934–1954

Stuart Ernest "Stu" Smith (September 25, 1915 – January 27, 2007) was a Canadian professional ice hockey forward. He played 4 games in the National Hockey League for the Montreal Canadiens during the 1940–41 and 1941–42 seasons. The rest of his career, which lasted from 1934 to 1954, was spent in the minor and senior leagues. He was born in Basswood, Manitoba. He died in 2007 in Lanark County, Ontario. His son, Brian Smith, also played in the NHL.

== Career statistics ==
=== Regular season and playoffs ===
			Regular season					Playoffs
Season	Team	League	GP	G	A	Pts	PIM	GP	G	A	Pts	PIM
1932–33	Kenora Thistles	WDJHL	10	12	1	13	4	7	3	1	4	6
1933–34	Kenora Thistles	MJHL	16	22	6	28	10	9	11	1	12	12
1933–34	Kenora Thistles	M-Cup	—	—	—	—	—	4	1	1	2	4
1934–35	Kenora Canadians	TBSHL	11	9	4	13	5	—	—	—	—	—
1935–36	Kenora Thistles	MJHL	12	11	2	13	5	—	—	—	—	—
1936–37	Sudbury Creighton Mines	NBHL	14	13	5	18	20	2	2	0	2	0
1937–38	Sudbury Creighton Mines	NBHL	9	5	2	7	2	5	3	0	3	8
1938–39	Kirkland Lake Blue Devils	GBHL	7	13	8	21	2	2	6	0	6	2
1939–40	Kirkland Lake Blue Devils	Exhib	15	9	8	17	8	—	—	—	—	—
1939–40	Kirkland Lake Blue Devils	Al-Cup	—	—	—	—	—	20	8	9	17	12
1940–41	Montreal Canadiens	NHL	3	2	1	3	0	1	0	0	0	0
1940–41	Quebec Royal Rifles	QCHL	35	33	26	59	37	4	0	0	0	4
1941–42	Montreal Canadiens	NHL	1	0	1	1	0	—	—	—	—	—
1941–42	Washington Lions	AHL	55	22	28	50	2	2	0	0	0	0
1942–43	Washington Lions	AHL	42	14	26	40	28	—	—	—	—	—
1942–43	Ottawa Canadiens	OCHL	10	11	14	25	6	8	6	7	13	2
1943–44	Ottawa Commandos	OCHL	25	10	17	27	2	3	1	1	2	2
1943–44	Hull Volants	Al-Cup	—	—	—	—	—	4	3	3	6	0
1944–45	Ottawa Commandos	OCHL	24	20	25	45	11	2	2	0	2	2
1945–46	Ottawa Senators	QSHL	36	29	35	64	10	7	7	2	9	9
1946–47	Ottawa Senators	QSHL	34	20	27	47	14	8	2	1	3	2
1947–48	Ottawa Senators	QSHL	45	21	42	63	6	12	5	7	12	8
1947–48	Ottawa Senators	Al-Cup	—	—	—	—	—	14	3	7	10	11
1948–49	Ottawa Senators	QSHL	40	12	18	30	2	—	—	—	—	—
1948–49	Ottawa Senators	Al-Cup	—	—	—	—	—	11	5	5	10	0
1949–50	Ottawa Senators	QSHL	53	27	22	49	6	5	2	2	4	0
1950–51	Smiths Falls Rideaus	ECSHL	17	25	11	36	—	5	10	4	14	—
1950–51	Smiths Falls Rideaus	Al-Cup	—	—	—	—	—	16	12	12	24	14
1951–52	Smiths Falls Rideaus	ECSHL	43	38	46	84	6	8	2	3	5	0
1952–53	Smiths Falls Rideaus	ECSHL	47	38	38	76	12	13	8	7	15	2
1952–53	Smiths Falls Rideaus	Al-Cup	—	—	—	—	—	11	5	9	14	4
1953–54	Smiths Falls Rideaus	ECSHL	19	19	23	42	6	13	0	5	5	12
QSHL totals			208	109	144	253	38	32	16	12	28	19
NHL totals			4	2	2	4	0	1	0	0	0	0
