= Tony Graboski =

Canadian ice hockey player

- Born: May 29, 1916; Timmins, Ontario, Canada
- Died: September 18, 2000 (aged 84)
- Height: 5 ft 10 in (178 cm)
- Weight: 180 lb (82 kg; 12 st 12 lb)
- Position: Left wing/Defence
- Shot: Left
- Played for: Montreal Canadiens
- Playing career: 1936–1946

Anthony Rudel Graboski (May 29, 1916 – September 18, 2000) was a Canadian professional ice hockey defenceman. He played 66 games in the National Hockey League for the Montreal Canadiens from 1940 to 1942. The rest of his career, which lasted from 1936 to 1946, was spent in the minor leagues. He was born in Timmins, Ontario, but grew up in Oshawa, Ontario.

== Career statistics ==
=== Regular season and playoffs ===
			Regular season					Playoffs
Season	Team	League	GP	G	A	Pts	PIM	GP	G	A	Pts	PIM
1933–34	Oshawa Juniors	OHA Jr A	16	6	6	12	16	3	0	1	1	8
1934–35	Oshawa Juniors	OHA Jr A	13	3	7	10	6	2	1	2	3	2
1935–36	Sudbury Cub Wolves	NOJHA	10	5	3	8	10	—	—	—	—	—
1935–36	Falconbridge Falcons	Al-Cup	—	—	—	—	—	5	2	0	2	4
1936–37	Hershey Bears	EAHL	48	17	9	26	36	4	2	1	3	2
1937–38	Hershey Bears	EAHL	50	29	26	55	17	—	—	—	—	—
1938–39	Hershey Cubs	EAHL	52	27	13	40	12	—	—	—	—	—
1939–40	Sydney Millionaires	CBSHL	34	29	27	56	50	4	4	4	8	18
1939–40	Sydney Millionaires	Al-Cup	—	—	—	—	—	11	11	7	18	6
1940–41	Montreal Canadiens	NHL	34	4	3	7	12	3	0	0	0	6
1940–41	New Haven Eagles	AHL	10	3	4	7	4	—	—	—	—	—
1941–42	Montreal Canadiens	NHL	23	2	5	7	8	—	—	—	—	—
1941–42	Washington Lions	AHL	23	3	2	5	12	2	0	0	0	0
1942–43	Montreal Canadiens	NHL	9	0	2	2	4	—	—	—	—	—
1942–43	Washington Lions	AHL	14	2	4	6	4	—	—	—	—	—
1942–43	Hershey Bears	AHL	22	6	22	28	6	6	0	0	0	2
1945–46	Ottawa Senators	QSHL	19	5	5	10	32	9	1	3	4	10
EAHL totals			150	73	48	121	65	4	2	1	3	2
NHL totals			66	6	10	16	24	3	0	0	0	6
