= Gus Giesebrecht =

Canadian ice hockey player

- Born: September 14, 1917 Pembroke, Ontario, Canada
- Died: December 27, 2006 (aged 89) Pembroke, Ontario, Canada
- Height: 6 ft 0 in (183 cm)
- Weight: 177 lb (80 kg; 12 st 9 lb)
- Position: Centre
- Shot: Left
- Played for: Detroit Red Wings
- Playing career: 1937–1942

Roy George "Gus" Giesebrecht (September 14, 1917 – December 27, 2006) was a professional ice hockey centre who played 135 games in the National Hockey League with the Detroit Red Wings. During his career he accumulated 27 goals and 51 assists for a total 78 points. Giesebrecht was widely regarded by fellow players and NHL coaches as one of the most promising rookies in the league at the time. He scored a hat trick in the first period of the first game he saw on-ice action with the Red Wings, and scored the game-winning goal against the Chicago Black Hawks that advanced the Red Wings to the 1941 Stanley Cup Finals.

Despite his early promise, World War II brought Giesebrecht's professional hockey career to an end. He chose to leave the Red Wings, volunteering for the Canadian Army. He was deployed to the European theatre as a corporal in the 2nd Canadian Infantry Division and saw action in France, Belgium, Netherlands and Germany. Giesebrecht opted not to return to professional hockey at the conclusion of the war, deciding instead to return to his hometown of Petawawa, Ontario, where he ran his family's business until his death in 2006.

== Playing career ==
Giesebrecht's junior career began at the age of 16 with the Ottawa St. Malachy's of the Ottawa City Junior Hockey League (OCJHL), with whom he played for the 1933–34 season, skating in 15 games and scoring 6 goals and 11 assists for 17 points. The following season, he divided his times between the OCJHL's Ottawa Senators, the Pembroke Lumber Kings of the Ontario Valley Junior Hockey League (OVJHL) and the Pembroke Falcons of the Northern Ontario Hockey Association (NOHA). Giesebrecht spent the 1935–36 season back with the OVJHL's Pembroke Lumber Kings.

Giesebrecht broke into the amateur leagues with the Pittsburgh Yellow Jackets of the Eastern Amateur Hockey League. He skated with the Yellow Jackets for the 1936–37 season, scoring 12 goals and 18 assists for 30 points in 47 games. He began the 1937–38 season with the Detroit Pontiacs of the Michigan Ontario Hockey League, with whom he led the league in scoring prior to turning pro.

Gus Giesebrecht, left, and Byron McDonald as members of the Pittsburgh Yellow Jackets in 1937.

Near the end of the 1937–38 season, Giesebrecht began his professional career with the Pittsburgh Hornets of the International-American Hockey League (IAHL). He returned to the Hornets (then the farm team for the Detroit Red Wings) for the start of the 1938–39 season. By December 1938 Giesebrecht was being called up to play for the Red Wings. Placed on a line with Hall of Famer Syd Howe, Giesebrecht distinguished himself as a rookie centre for the Red Wings in February 1939 when he scored three goals in the first period in a 7–3 victory over the New York Americans. He skated in 28 games with the Red Wings that season, tallying 10 goals and 10 assists for 20 points in regular season play. Giesebrecht also joined the Red Wings for the playoffs, netting 2 assists in 6 games.

Giesebrecht began the 1939–40 season with the Red Wings, but found himself sent down to their farm team—the IAHL's Indianapolis Capitals—after scoring only 4 goals and 7 assists in 30 games. He tallied 10 goals and 9 assists for 19 points in 21 games during regular season play with the Capitals and skated in 5 playoff games, scoring 4 goals and 1 assist. Giesebrecht returned to the Red Wings for the 1940–41 season, scoring 7 goals and 18 assists in 43 games, including the opening goal in a 2–1 victory over the Chicago Black Hawks on "Jack Adams Night", a tribute to long-time Red Wings manager Jack Adams. He faced the Black Hawks again in the Stanley Cup semi-final round, scoring the game-winning goal in sudden-death overtime that eliminated the Black Hawks and sent the Red Wings to the finals. They were ultimately defeated by the Boston Bruins in four straight games.

The 1941–42 season again found Giesebrecht splitting his time between the Red Wings and their farm team Indianapolis Capitals (in the newly renamed American Hockey League). He spent the majority of the season in Detroit, netting 6 goals and 16 assists in 34 games, and seeing a 2-game call-up for the Stanley Cup finals against the Toronto Maple Leafs. Giesebrecht found the championship that had eluded him his entire professional career, however, with the Capitals, scoring 1 goal and 3 assists in 10 games to defeat the Hershey Bears and win the Calder Cup.

Giesebrecht's professional career came to an untimely end in 1942 when he volunteered for the Canadian Army during World War II. He served as a corporal in the 2nd Canadian Infantry Division, Ordnance Field Park. His unit landed at Normandy one month after D-Day, and saw action in France, Belgium, Netherlands, and Germany. He turned down an offer from Jack Adams to return to the Red Wings at the end of the war, and instead worked at his family business and played senior hockey. Giesebrecht died on December 27, 2006, and was buried in Calvin United Cemetery, Pembroke Ontario.

== Career statistics ==
			Regular season					Playoffs
Season	Team	League	GP	G	A	Pts	PIM	GP	G	A	Pts	PIM
1933–34	Ottawa St. Malachy's	OCJHL	15	6	11	17	4	—	—	—	—	—
1934–35	Ottawa Senators	OCJHL	5	7	7	14	0	—	—	—	—	—
1934–35	Pembroke Lumber Kings	OVJHL	5	7	3	10	—	—	—	—	—	—
1934–35	Pembroke Falcons	NOHA	4	4	4	8	—	—	—	—	—
1935–36	Pembroke Lumber Kings	OVJHL	8	12	12	24	8	2	3	0	3	3
1936–37	Pittsburgh Yellow Jackets	EAHL	47	12	18	30	11	—	—	—	—	—
1937–38	Detroit Pontiacs	MOHL	28	23	25	48	2	3	2	1	3	0
1937–38	Pittsburgh Hornets	IAHL	3	0	0	0	0	2	0	0	0	0
1938–39	Detroit Red Wings	NHL	28	10	10	20	2	6	0	2	2	0
1938–39	Pittsburgh Hornets	IAHL	24	6	6	12	4	—	—	—	—	—
1939–40	Detroit Red Wings	NHL	30	4	7	11	2	—	—	—	—	—
1939–40	Indianapolis Capitals	IAHL	21	10	9	19	0	5	4	1	5	0
1940–41	Detroit Red Wings	NHL	43	7	18	25	7	9	2	1	3	0
1941–42	Detroit Red Wings	NHL	34	6	16	22	2	2	0	0	0	0
1941–42	Indianapolis Capitals	AHL	15	6	7	13	4	10	1	3	4	0
NHL totals			135	27	51	78	13	17	2	3	5	0
