= John Chad =

Canadian ice hockey player

- Born: September 16, 1919; Provost, Alberta, Canada
- Died: October 11, 1970 (aged 51)
- Height: 5 ft 10 in (178 cm)
- Weight: 167 lb (76 kg; 11 st 13 lb)
- Position: Right Wing
- Shot: Right
- Played for: Chicago Black Hawks; Wembley Lions
- Playing career: 1939–1953

John Chad (September 16, 1919 – October 11, 1970) was a Canadian professional ice hockey forward who played 80 games in the National Hockey League for the Chicago Black Hawks between 1940 and 1946. The rest of his career, which lasted from 1939 to 1953, was mainly spent in the minor leagues.

== Career statistics ==
=== Regular season and playoffs ===
			Regular season					Playoffs
Season	Team	League	GP	G	A	Pts	PIM	GP	G	A	Pts	PIM
1935–36	Print Albert St. Marks	SAHA	—	—	—	—	—	2	2	0	2	0
1936–37	Print Albert St. Marks	SAHA	—	—	—	—	—	2	3	0	3	0
1937–38	Saskatoon Chiefs	SAHA	6	11	8	19	4	2	4	2	6	9
1937–38	Saskatoon Chiefs	M-Cup	—	—	—	—	—	6	10	4	14	9
1938–39	Edmonton Athletic Club	EJrHL	7	15	15	30	0	2	2	1	3	0
1938–39	Edmonton Athletic Club	M-Cup	—	—	—	—	—	14	26	15	41	16
1939–40	Chicago Black Hawks	NHL	22	8	3	11	11	2	0	0	0	0
1939–40	Providence Reds	IAHL	31	14	8	22	8	6	0	3	3	0
1940–41	Chicago Black Hawks	NHL	45	7	18	25	16	5	0	0	0	2
1941–42	Regina Rangers	S-SSHL	25	16	7	23	10	3	1	0	1	16
1942–43	Calgary RCAF	ASHL	23	20	21	41	32	7	7	4	11	22
1943–44	Calgary Combines	CNDHL	9	2	1	3	4	—	—	—	—	—
1944–45	Calgary RCAF	CNDHL	9	5	6	11	6	—	—	—	—	—
1945–46	Chicago Black Hawks	NHL	13	0	1	1	2	3	0	1	1	0
1945–46	Wembley Lions	ENL	—	—	—	—	—	—	—	—	—	—
1946–47	Providence Reds	AHL	63	32	43	75	12	—	—	—	—	—
1947–48	Providence Reds	AHL	67	41	53	94	8	5	0	1	1	0
1948–49	Providence Reds	AHL	55	32	46	78	8	8	3	6	9	0
1949–50	Providence Reds	AHL	70	36	54	90	4	4	1	3	4	0
1950–51	Providence Reds	AHL	34	13	19	32	2	—	—	—	—	—
1951–52	Saskatoon Quakers	PCHL	67	35	47	82	6	13	7	10	17	0
1952–53	Saskatoon Quakers	WHL	70	26	34	60	20	13	7	4	11	0
1964–65	Pittsburgh Hornets	AHL	65	16	31	47	32	4	2	6	8	0
IAHL/AHL totals			320	168	223	391	42	23	4	13	17	0
NHL totals			80	15	22	37	29	10	0	1	1	2
