= Alex Motter =

Canadian ice hockey player

- Born: June 20, 1913 Melville, Saskatchewan, Canada
- Died: October 18, 1996 (aged 83) Regina, Saskatchewan, Canada
- Height: 6 ft 0 in (183 cm)
- Weight: 185 lb (84 kg; 13 st 3 lb)
- Position: Defence
- Shot: Left
- Played for: Boston Bruins; Detroit Red Wings
- Playing career: 1934–1948

Alexander Everett Motter (June 20, 1913 – October 18, 1996) was a Canadian ice hockey player who played 265 games in the National Hockey League with the Boston Bruins and Detroit Red Wings between 1934 and 1943. He won the Stanley Cup in 1943 with the Detroit Red Wings. Motter was born in Melville, Saskatchewan.

Motter scored his first NHL goal on March 8, 1936, as a member of the Boston Bruins. It came in his team's 5–2 win over Detroit at Olympia Stadium. It was the only goal Motter would ever score for Boston.

== Career statistics ==
=== Regular season and playoffs ===
| | | | Regular season | | | | | Playoffs |
| Season | Team | League | GP | G | A | Pts | PIM | GP | G | A | Pts | PIM |
|---|---|---|---|---|---|---|---|---|---|---|---|---|
| 1930–31 | Melville Millionaires | S-SSHL | 20 | 4 | 4 | 8 | 12 | — | — | — | — | — |
| 1931–32 | Regina Pats | RJrHL | 3 | 1 | 1 | 2 | 0 | 2 | 1 | 0 | 1 | 0 |
| 1931–32 | Regina Pats | M-Cup | — | — | — | — | — | 4 | 2 | 0 | 2 | 0 |
| 1932–33 | Regina Pats | RJrHL | 3 | 2 | 1 | 3 | 2 | 13 | 2 | 0 | 2 | 10 |
| 1932–33 | Regina Pats | M-Cup | — | — | — | — | — | 13 | 2 | 0 | 2 | 10 |
| 1933–34 | Prince Albert Mintos | SSHL | 22 | 17 | 19 | 36 | 22 | 4 | 0 | 1 | 1 | 2 |
| 1934–35 | Boston Bruins | AHL | 3 | 0 | 0 | 0 | 0 | 4 | 0 | 0 | 0 | 0 |
| 1934–35 | Boston Tigers | Can-Am | 42 | 14 | 11 | 25 | 34 | 3 | 1 | 2 | 3 | 0 |
| 1935–36 | Boston Bruins | NHL | 23 | 1 | 4 | 5 | 4 | 2 | 0 | 0 | 0 | 0 |
| 1935–36 | Boston Cubs | Can-Am | 15 | 2 | 8 | 10 | 13 | — | — | — | — | — |
| 1936–37 | Providence Reds | IAHL | 43 | 11 | 14 | 25 | 26 | 3 | 0 | 1 | 1 | 0 |
| 1937–38 | Providence Reds | IAHL | 17 | 6 | 6 | 12 | 4 | — | — | — | — | — |
| 1937–38 | Detroit Red Wings | NHL | 32 | 5 | 17 | 22 | 6 | — | — | — | — | — |
| 1938–39 | Detroit Red Wings | NHL | 44 | 5 | 11 | 16 | 17 | 4 | 0 | 1 | 1 | 0 |
| 1939–40 | Detroit Red Wings | NHL | 37 | 7 | 12 | 19 | 28 | 5 | 1 | 1 | 2 | 15 |
| 1939–40 | Indianapolis Capitals | IAHL | 16 | 5 | 4 | 9 | 16 | — | — | — | — | — |
| 1940–41 | Detroit Red Wings | NHL | 47 | 13 | 12 | 25 | 18 | 9 | 1 | 3 | 4 | 4 |
| 1940–41 | Indianapolis Capitals | AHL | 1 | 0 | 0 | 0 | 0 | — | — | — | — | — |
| 1941–42 | Detroit Red Wings | NHL | 29 | 2 | 4 | 6 | 20 | 12 | 1 | 3 | 4 | 20 |
| 1942–43 | Detroit Red Wings | NHL | 50 | 6 | 4 | 10 | 42 | 5 | 0 | 1 | 1 | 2 |
| 1942–43 | Cleveland Barons | AHL | 2 | 1 | 1 | 2 | 0 | — | — | — | — | — |
| 1943–44 | United States Coast Guard Cutters | EAHL | 33 | 12 | 21 | 33 | 12 | 12 | 4 | 10 | 14 | 9 |
| 1945–46 | Cleveland Barons | AHL | 23 | 1 | 7 | 8 | 18 | 12 | 4 | 2 | 6 | 4 |
| 1946–47 | Springfield Indians | AHL | 61 | 6 | 14 | 20 | 50 | 2 | 1 | 0 | 1 | 0 |
| 1947–48 | Philadelphia Rockets | AHL | 63 | 6 | 22 | 28 | 55 | — | — | — | — | — |
| NHL totals | | | 265 | 39 | 64 | 103 | 135 | 41 | 3 | 9 | 12 | 41 |
