= 1941 Stanley Cup Final =

1941 ice hockey championship series

	1	2	3	4	Total
Boston Bruins	3	2	4	3	4
Detroit Red Wings	2	1	2	1	0
- Location(s): Boston: Boston Garden (1, 2); Detroit: Olympia Stadium (3, 4)
- Coaches: Boston: Cooney Weiland; Detroit: Jack Adams
- Captains: Boston: Dit Clapper; Detroit: Ebbie Goodfellow
- Dates: April 6–12, 1941
- Series-winning goal: Bobby Bauer (8:43, second)
- Hall of Famers: Bruins: Bobby Bauer (1996); Frank Brimsek (1966); Dit Clapper (1947); Roy Conacher (1998); Bill Cowley (1968); Woody Dumart (1992); Milt Schmidt (1961); Red Wings: Sid Abel (1969); Ebbie Goodfellow (1963); Syd Howe (1965); Jack Stewart (1964); Coaches: Jack Adams (1959, player); Cooney Weiland (1971, player)

The 1941 Stanley Cup Final was a best-of-seven series between the Boston Bruins and the Detroit Red Wings. Boston would win the series 4–0 to win their third Stanley Cup.

== Paths to the Finals ==
Boston defeated the Toronto Maple Leafs in a best-of-seven 4–3 to advance to the Finals. The Red Wings had to play two best-of three series; winning 2–1 against the New York Rangers, and 2–0 against the Chicago Black Hawks to advance to the Finals.

== Game summaries ==
In the third best-of-seven series, Boston became the first to sweep the series in four games.

April 6	Detroit Red Wings	2–3	Boston Bruins	Boston Garden	Recap
No scoring		First period	13:26 - Eddie Wiseman (4)
No scoring		Second period	14:45 - Milt Schmidt (3)
Carl Liscombe (3) - 10:55; Syd Howe (1) - 17:45		Third period	9:16 - Pat McReavy (2)
Johnny Mowers		Goalie stats	Frank Brimsek

April 8	Detroit Red Wings	1–2	Boston Bruins	Boston Garden	Recap
No scoring		First period	No scoring
No scoring		Second period	No scoring
Mud Bruneteau (2) - 2:41		Third period	13:35 - Terry Reardon (2); 17:35 - Roy Conacher (1)
Johnny Mowers		Goalie stats	Frank Brimsek

April 10	Boston Bruins	4–2	Detroit Red Wings	Olympia Stadium	Recap
Eddie Wiseman (5) - 3:57; Milt Schmidt (4) - 14:07		First period	3:15 - Bill Jennings (2); 7:45 - Sid Abel (2)
Milt Schmidt (5) - 00:59		Second period	No scoring
Art Jackson (1) - pp - 17:20		Third period	No scoring
Frank Brimsek		Goalie stats	Johnny Mowers

April 12	Boston Bruins	3–1	Detroit Red Wings	Olympia Stadium	Recap
No scoring		First period	10:14 - pp - Carl Liscombe (4)
Flash Hollett (3) - pp - 7:42; Bobby Bauer - pp - 8:43; Eddie Wiseman (6) - 19:32		Second period	No scoring
No scoring		Third period	No scoring
Frank Brimsek		Goalie stats	Johnny Mowers

Boston won series 4–0

== Stanley Cup engraving ==
The 1941 Stanley Cup was presented to Bruins captain Dit Clapper by NHL President Frank Calder following the Bruins 3–1 win over the Red Wings in game four.

The following Bruins players and staff had their names engraved on the Stanley Cup

1940–41 Boston Bruins

=== Players ===
Centres

- 10 Bill Cowley
- 12 Pat McReavy ‡
- 15 Milt Schmidt
- 16 Art Jackson

Wingers

- 4 Herb Cain
- 7 Eddie Wiseman
- 9 Roy Conacher
- 11 Mel Hill
- 14 Woody Porky Dumart
- 17 Bobby Bauer

Defencemen

- 2 Bill Flash Hollett
- 5 Aubrey Dit Clapper (Captain)
- 6 Jack Crawford
- 8 Des Smith †
- 11–12 Jack Shewchuk*
- 19 Terry Reardon

Goaltenders

- 1 Frank Brimsek

=== Coaching and administrative staff ===
- Weston Adams Sr. (President/Owner), Art Ross (Vice President/Manager)
- Ralph Burkard (Treasurer), Ralph Cooney Weiland (Coach)
- Win Green (Trainer)

=== Stanley Cup engraving ===
- * #11–12 Jack Shewchuk (D) played 22 of 48 regular season games, but was not dressed in the playoffs. He was originally left off the cup. Shewchuk's name was added to the cup when it was redone during 1957–58, but not Gordie Bruce.
- † #8 Des Smith (D) was engraved as WES SMITH with a "W" instead of a "D". This mistake was corrected when the Stanley Cup was redone during the 1957–58 Season.
- ‡ #12 Pat McReavy (C) was misspelled PAT McCREAVY with an extra "C" on the new version of the cup created during the 1957–58 season. Pat McReavy was often misspelled as Pat McCreavy on some team pictures with the Boston Bruins. When the Replica Cup was created in 1992–93, Pat McReavy's name was misspelled again as Pat McCeavy with a "C" instead of a "R".
- Frank Ryan (Publicity Director) was included on 1929, 1939, and 1941 Stanley Cup pictures, but his name is not engraved on the Stanley Cup.
- Gordie Bruce (LW) was originally credited with playing 8 regular season games and 3 playoff games. Bruce's stats were corrected to only 7 regular season games and no playoff games. He did not qualify, so his name was left off the Stanley Cup.

== See also ==
- 1940–41 NHL season

== References & notes ==
- Diamond, Dan (2000). Total Stanley Cup. Toronto: Total Sports Canada. ISBN 978-1-892129-07-9.
- Podnieks, Andrew; Hockey Hall of Fame (2004). Lord Stanley's Cup. Bolton, Ont.: Fenn Pub. pp 12, 50. ISBN 978-1-55168-261-7
- "All-Time NHL Results". Archived from the original on July 24, 2017.

Preceded by New York Rangers; 1940	Boston Bruins; Stanley Cup champions 1941	Succeeded by Toronto Maple Leafs; 1942
