= Erwin Chamberlain =

Canadian ice hockey player (1915–1986)

Murph Chamberlain
- Chamberlain c. 1930
- Born: February 14, 1915 Shawville, Quebec, Canada
- Died: May 8, 1986 (aged 71) Beachville, Ontario, Canada
- Height: 5 ft 11 in (180 cm)
- Weight: 165 lb (75 kg; 11 st 11 lb)
- Position: Centre
- Shot: Left
- Played for: Montreal Canadiens; Boston Bruins; Brooklyn Americans; Toronto Maple Leafs
- Playing career: 1937–1949

Erwin Groves "Murph" Chamberlain (February 14, 1915 in Shawville, Quebec – May 8, 1986) was a Canadian ice hockey centre who played in the National Hockey League for the Toronto Maple Leafs, Montreal Canadiens, Brooklyn Americans and Boston Bruins between 1937 and 1949. He won the Stanley Cup twice, in 1944 and 1946, both with Montreal.

== Playing career before NHL ==
Chamberlain, whose first name was spelled "Irwin" in his hometown newspaper, reportedly began his hockey career in Shawville, PQ. He was reportedly added to the Toronto Maple Leafs reserve list by 1937 after steadily improving his game while playing in Northern Ontario.

In April 1937 he scored four goals and two goals respectively for the Sudbury Tigers in two-game Eastern Canada senior amateur hockey finals against the Hull Volants. The Tigers won the first game in Ottawa 9–4 in front of a "record-breaking" crowd before winning the second game in Toronto by a score of 14–2.

The Sudbury Tigers then travelled to Calgary, Alberta to play for the Allan Cup in a best-of-five series against the Western Canada senior champs, the North Battleford Beavers. Sudbury won in five games.

As the Allan Cup champions, the Sudbury Tigers earned a berth in the one and only Toronto International Tournament in April 1937 which pitted them against the English National League champs (Wembley Lions), the USA Amateur Champions (Hershey Bears) and the Memorial Cup Champs (Winnipeg Monarchs). The Sudbury Tigers scored a sudden-death goal in the third game of a 3-game final against the Wembley Lions to win the tournament. The tournament was hampered by controversies and low crowds so was not continued in following years.

== NHL career ==
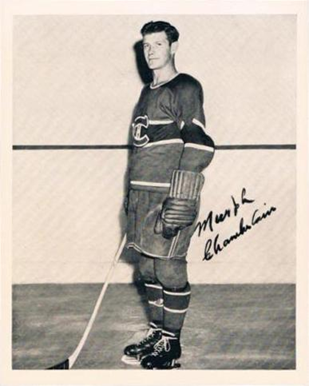
Late 1940s Quaker Oats card of Chamberlain for Montreal Canadiens

Chamberlain began his NHL Career with the Toronto Maple Leafs in the 1938 season and played for them until the end of the 1940 season. The next year, he played for the Montreal Canadiens. In the 1942 season, he spent time in the AHL with the Washington Lions. Later that season, he was called back to Montreal and then traded to the Brooklyn Americans. He spent the 1943 season with the Boston Bruins. After that season he returned to Montreal for the final six seasons of his career. He won the Stanley Cup twice with Montreal, in the 1944 season and the 1946 season. He retired from hockey after the 1949 season.

== Coaching career and later life ==
Chamberlain was head coach of the Sudbury Wolves of the EPHL for the 1960–61 and 1962–63 seasons. He died in 1986 at the age of 71 and was cremated.

== Career statistics ==
=== Regular season and playoffs ===
			Regular season					Playoffs
Season	Team	League	GP	G	A	Pts	PIM	GP	G	A	Pts	PIM
1932–33	Ottawa Primrose	OCJHL	11	7	2	9	19	4	3	1	4	6
1933–34	Ottawa New Edinburghs	OCHL	—	—	—	—	—	—	—	—	—	—
1934–35	Noranda Copper Kings	GBHL	13	6	5	11	10	—	—	—	—	—
1935–36	South Porcupine Porkies	NOHA	8	7	0	7	33	2	0	1	1	11
1936–37	Sudbury Frood Miners	NBHL	15	12	3	15	38	2	0	0	0	2
1936–37	Sudbury Frood Miners	Al-Cup	—	—	—	—	—	13	17	3	20	37
1937–38	Toronto Maple Leafs	NHL	43	4	12	16	51	5	0	0	0	2
1938–39	Toronto Maple Leafs	NHL	48	10	16	26	32	10	2	5	7	4
1939–40	Toronto Maple Leafs	NHL	40	5	17	22	63	3	0	0	0	0
1940–41	Montreal Canadiens	NHL	45	10	15	25	75	3	0	2	2	11
1941–42	Montreal Canadiens	NHL	26	6	3	9	30	—	—	—	—	—
1941–42	Brooklyn Americans	NHL	11	6	9	15	16	—	—	—	—	—
1941–42	Springfield Indians	AHL	3	2	1	3	0	—	—	—	—	—
1942–43	Boston Bruins	NHL	45	9	24	33	67	6	1	1	2	12
1943–44	Montreal Canadiens	NHL	47	15	32	47	85	9	5	3	8	12
1944–45	Montreal Canadiens	NHL	32	2	12	14	38	6	1	1	2	10
1945–46	Montreal Canadiens	NHL	40	12	14	26	42	9	4	2	6	18
1946–47	Montreal Canadiens	NHL	49	10	10	20	97	11	1	3	4	19
1947–48	Montreal Canadiens	NHL	30	6	3	9	62	—	—	—	—	—
1948–49	Montreal Canadiens	NHL	54	5	8	13	111	4	0	0	0	8
1949–50	Sydney Millionaires	CBSHL	—	—	—	—	—	—	—	—	—	—
NHL totals			510	100	175	275	769	66	14	17	31	96

== Achievements ==
- Allan Cup champion – 1937
- Stanley Cup champion – 1944, 1946
