= 1934–35 Montreal Canadiens season =

NHL hockey team season

1934–35 Montreal Canadiens
- Division: 3rd Canadian
- 1934–35 record: 19–23–6
- Home record: 11–11–2
- Road record: 8–12–4
- Goals for: 110
- Goals against: 145

Team information
- General manager: Leo Dandurand
- Coach: Newsy Lalonde
- Captain: Sylvio Mantha
- Arena: Montreal Forum

Team leaders
- Goals: Leroy Goldsworthy (20)
- Assists: Alfred Lepine; Wildor Larochelle (19)
- Points: Alfred Lepine (31)
- Penalty minutes: Roger Jenkins (63)
- Wins: Wilf Cude (19)
- Goals against average: Wilf Cude (2.94)

The 1934–35 Montreal Canadiens season was the team's 26th season of play. The Canadiens again qualified for the playoffs, finishing third in their division. The club met and lost to the New York Rangers in the playoffs.

== Regular season ==
A bombshell trade was made with Howie Morenz, Lorne Chabot, and Marty Burke going to Chicago for Leroy Goldsworthy, Roger Jenkins, and Lionel Conacher. The Canadiens then traded Lionel Conacher and Herb Cain to the Maroons for Nels Crutchfield.

=== Final standings ===
Canadian Division
	GP	W	L	T	GF	GA	PTS
**Toronto Maple Leafs**	48	30	14	4	157	111	64
**Montreal Maroons**	48	24	19	5	123	92	53
**Montreal Canadiens**	48	19	23	6	110	145	44
New York Americans	48	12	27	9	100	142	33
St. Louis Eagles	48	11	31	6	86	144	28

Note: W = Wins, L = Losses, T = Ties, GF = Goals For, GA = Goals Against, Pts = Points
Teams that qualified for the playoffs are highlighted in bold.

=== Record vs. opponents ===
==== vs. Canadian Division ====
1934–35 NHL records
Team	MTL	MTM	NYA	STL	TOR	Total
Mtl Canadiens	—	4–1–1	2–3–1	4–0–2	1–5	**11–9–4**
Mtl Maroons	1–4–1	—	4–1–1	5–1	1–5	**11–11–2**
NY Americans	3–2–1	1–4–1	—	0–4–2	1–4–1	**5–14–5**
St. Louis	0–4–2	1–5	4–0–2	—	0–5–1	**5–14–5**
Toronto	5–1	5–1	4–1–1	5–0–1	—	**19–3–2**

==== vs. American Division ====
1934–35 NHL records
Team	BOS	CHI	DET	NYR	Total
Mtl Canadiens	2–4	1–4–1	1–4–1	4–2	**8–14–2**
Mtl Maroons	4–1–1	3–3	3–2–1	3–2–1	**13–8–3**
NY Rangers	2–4	2–4	1–2–3	2–3–1	**7–13–4**
St. Louis	1–5	1–4–1	3–3	1–5	**6–17–1**
Toronto	2–3–1	5–1	2–3–1	2–4	**11–11–2**

== Schedule and results ==
1934–35 regular season
November

Game	Result	Date	Score	Opponent	Record
1	L	November 10, 1934	1–2 OT	@ Toronto Maple Leafs (1934–35)	0–1–0
2	L	November 17, 1934	0–3	Detroit Red Wings (1934–35)	0–2–0
3	L	November 22, 1934	3–4	New York Americans (1934–35)	0–3–0
4	L	November 24, 1934	1–3	@ Montreal Maroons (1934–35)	0–4–0
5	W	November 27, 1934	3–2	@ New York Rangers (1934–35)	1–4–0

December

Game	Result	Date	Score	Opponent	Record
6	L	December 1, 1934	0–2	Boston Bruins (1934–35)	1–5–0
7	W	December 4, 1934	5–3	New York Rangers (1934–35)	2–5–0
8	L	December 8, 1934	0–4	@ Boston Bruins (1934–35)	2–6–0
9	T	December 9, 1934	2–2 OT	@ New York Americans (1934–35)	2–6–1
10	W	December 11, 1934	4–1	Montreal Maroons (1934–35)	3–6–1
11	T	December 15, 1934	1–1 OT	St. Louis Eagles (1934–35)	3–6–2
12	T	December 18, 1934	1–1 OT	Chicago Black Hawks (1934–35)	3–6–3
13	W	December 22, 1934	2–1	@ St. Louis Eagles (1934–35)	4–6–3
14	W	December 23, 1934	4–1	@ Chicago Black Hawks (1934–35)	5–6–3
15	L	December 25, 1934	2–6	Toronto Maple Leafs (1934–35)	5–7–3
16	L	December 29, 1934	1–3	New York Americans (1934–35)	5–8–3

January

Game	Result	Date	Score	Opponent	Record
17	L	January 1, 1935	3–5	@ New York Americans (1934–35)	5–9–3
18	L	January 3, 1935	1–2	Boston Bruins (1934–35)	5–10–3
19	L	January 5, 1935	1–3	@ Toronto Maple Leafs (1934–35)	5–11–3
20	L	January 6, 1935	2–6	@ Detroit Red Wings (1934–35)	5–12–3
21	W	January 12, 1935	3–2	Montreal Maroons (1934–35)	6–12–3
22	W	January 17, 1935	4–3	Toronto Maple Leafs (1934–35)	7–12–3
23	W	January 19, 1935	4–1	@ Boston Bruins (1934–35)	8–12–3
24	L	January 20, 1935	1–7	@ New York Rangers (1934–35)	8–13–3
25	L	January 22, 1935	0–7	New York Rangers (1934–35)	8–14–3
26	W	January 24, 1935	2–1	@ Montreal Maroons (1934–35)	9–14–3
27	W	January 26, 1935	3–2	Boston Bruins (1934–35)	10–14–3
28	T	January 31, 1935	4–4 OT	@ Detroit Red Wings (1934–35)	10–14–4

February

Game	Result	Date	Score	Opponent	Record
29	T	February 2, 1935	1–1 OT	@ St. Louis Eagles (1934–35)	10–14–5
30	L	February 5, 1935	1–4	@ Chicago Black Hawks (1934–35)	10–15–5
31	W	February 7, 1935	4–1	Detroit Red Wings (1934–35)	11–15–5
32	W	February 9, 1935	4–2	St. Louis Eagles (1934–35)	12–15–5
33	W	February 14, 1935	2–0	Montreal Maroons (1934–35)	13–15–5
34	W	February 17, 1935	3–1	@ New York Americans (1934–35)	14–15–5
35	L	February 19, 1935	1–3	@ Boston Bruins (1934–35)	14–16–5
36	L	February 21, 1935	1–3	Chicago Black Hawks (1934–35)	14–17–5
37	W	February 23, 1935	4–2	New York Americans (1934–35)	15–17–5
38	W	February 28, 1935	4–2	St. Louis Eagles (1934–35)	16–17–5

March

Game	Result	Date	Score	Opponent	Record
39	W	March 2, 1935	3–2 OT	@ St. Louis Eagles (1934–35)	17–17–5
40	L	March 3, 1935	0–3	@ Chicago Black Hawks (1934–35)	17–18–5
41	L	March 5, 1935	3–10	Toronto Maple Leafs (1934–35)	17–19–5
42	T	March 7, 1935	2–2 OT	@ Montreal Maroons (1934–35)	17–19–6
43	L	March 9, 1935	3–5	Detroit Red Wings (1934–35)	17–20–6
44	W	March 12, 1935	4–3	@ New York Rangers (1934–35)	18–20–6
45	W	March 14, 1935	5–4	New York Rangers (1934–35)	19–20–6
46	L	March 16, 1935	3–5	@ Toronto Maple Leafs (1934–35)	19–21–6
47	L	March 17, 1935	2–6	@ Detroit Red Wings (1934–35)	19–22–6
48	L	March 19, 1935	2–4	Chicago Black Hawks (1934–35)	19–23–6

Legend: Win (2 points) Loss (0 points) Tie (1 point)

== Playoffs ==
In the first round the Canadiens met the New York Rangers, who had placed third in the American Division. The Canadiens lost the two-games total-goals series 5–6 (1–2, 4–4).

In the first game, there was a bench-clearing brawl after Nels Crutchfield cut Bill Cook on the head with his stick. The police were needed to end the brawl. Crutchfield was given a match penalty with no substitution. The Canadiens played the thirteen minutes one man short and two minutes two men short. Bill Cook returned wearing a helmet over his bandages to score the second Rangers goal.

In the second game, the Canadiens were down 4–1 on the game and tied it with three straight goals in the third. The Canadiens could not get another goal to tie the series.

=== New York Rangers vs. Montreal Canadiens ===
Date	Visitor	Home	Score	Record
March 24	Montreal Canadiens	New York Rangers	1–2	1–2
March 26	New York Rangers	Montreal Canadiens	4–4	-

== Player statistics ==
=== Regular season ===
==== Scoring ====
Player	Pos	GP	G	A	Pts	PIM
Pit Lepine	C	48	12	19	31	16
Leroy Goldsworthy	RW	33	20	9	29	13
Aurel Joliat	LW	48	17	12	29	18
Wildor Larochelle	RW	48	9	19	28	12
Armand Mondou	LW	46	9	15	24	6
Georges Mantha	D/LW	42	12	10	22	14
Jack Riley	C	47	4	11	15	4
Sylvio Mantha	D	47	3	11	14	36
Jack McGill	LW	44	9	1	10	34
Nels Crutchfield	C	41	5	5	10	20
Roger Jenkins	RW/D	45	4	6	10	63
Johnny Gagnon	RW	23	1	5	6	2
Tony Savage	D	41	1	5	6	4
Joe Lamb	RW	7	3	2	5	4
Gerry Carson	D	48	0	5	5	56
Paul Raymond	RW	20	1	1	2	0
Norm Collings	F	1	0	1	1	0
Des Roche	RW	5	0	1	1	0
Leo Bourgeault	D	4	0	0	0	0
Wilf Cude	G	48	0	0	0	0
Polly Drouin	LW	4	0	0	0	0
Albert Leduc	D	4	0	0	0	4
Bob McCulley	RW/D	1	0	0	0	0
Jack Portland	D	5	0	0	0	2
Paul Runge	C/LW	3	0	0	0	2

==== Goaltending ====
Player	MIN	GP	W	L	T	GA	GAA	SO
Wilf Cude	2960	48	19	23	6	145	2.94	1
Team:	2960	48	19	23	6	145	2.94	1

=== Playoffs ===
==== Scoring ====
Player	Pos	GP	G	A	Pts	PIM
Jack McGill	LW	2	2	0	2	0
Jack Riley	C	2	0	2	2	0
Leroy Goldsworthy	RW	2	1	0	1	0
Roger Jenkins	RW/D	2	1	0	1	2
Aurel Joliat	LW	2	1	0	1	0
Nels Crutchfield	C	2	0	1	1	22
Johnny Gagnon	RW	2	0	1	1	2
Armand Mondou	LW	2	0	1	1	0
Gerry Carson	D	2	0	0	0	4
Wilf Cude	G	2	0	0	0	0
Wildor Larochelle	RW	2	0	0	0	0
Pit Lepine	C	2	0	0	0	2
Georges Mantha	D/LW	2	0	0	0	4
Sylvio Mantha	D	2	0	0	0	2
Tony Savage	D	2	0	0	0	0

==== Goaltending ====
Player	MIN	GP	W	L	GA	GAA	SO
Wilf Cude	120	2	0	1	6	3.00	0
Team:	120	2	0	1	6	3.00	0

Note:

Pos = Position;GP = Games played; G = Goals; A = Assists; Pts = Points; PIM = Penalty minutes; +/- = Plus/minus; PPG = Power-play goals; SHG = Short-handed goals; GWG = Game-winning goals
Pos = Position;GP = Games played; Min, TOI = Minutes played; W = Wins; L = Losses; T,T/OT = Ties; OTL = Overtime losses; GA = Goals-against; GAA = Goals-against average; SO = Shutouts; SA = Shots against; SV = Shots saved;SV% = Save percentage;

== Awards and records ==
- Aurel Joliat – NHL Second All-Star team

== Transactions ==
- October 3, 1934 – Traded Howie Morenz, Marty Burke and Lorne Chabot to Chicago Blackhawks for Roger Jenkins, Lionel Conacher and Leroy Goldsworthy.
- October 3, 1934 – Traded Lionel Conacher to Montreal Maroons with the rights to Herb Cain for the rights to Nels Crutchfield.
- October 17, 1934 – Traded Leroy Goldsworthy to Chicago for cash.
- December 18, 1934 – Received Leroy Goldsworthy from Chicago for cash.

== See also ==
- 1934–35 NHL season
