= 1934–35 Montreal Maroons season =

National Hockey League team season

1934–35 Montreal Maroons
- Stanley Cup champions
- Division: 2nd Canadian
- 1934–35 record: 24–19–5
- Home record: 12–9–3
- Road record: 12–10–2
- Goals for: 123
- Goals against: 92

Team information
- Coach: Tommy Gorman
- Captain: Hooley Smith
- Arena: Montreal Forum

Team leaders
- Goals: Herb Cain (20)
- Assists: Hooley Smith (22)
- Points: Earl Robinson (35)
- Penalty minutes: Stewart Evans (54)
- Wins: Alec Connell (24)
- Goals against average: Alec Connell (1.86)

The 1934–35 Montreal Maroons season was the 11th season of the NHL franchise. The team finished second in the Canadian Division. In the playoffs, the Maroons defeated Chicago Black Hawks, the New York Rangers and the Toronto Maple Leafs to win the franchise's second Stanley Cup championship.

== Offseason ==
Tommy Gorman, after winning the Stanley Cup with the Chicago Black Hawks, was hired to coach the Maroons, replacing Eddie Gerard.

== Regular season ==
=== Final standings ===
Canadian Division
	GP	W	L	T	GF	GA	PTS
**Toronto Maple Leafs**	48	30	14	4	157	111	64
**Montreal Maroons**	48	24	19	5	123	92	53
**Montreal Canadiens**	48	19	23	6	110	145	44
New York Americans	48	12	27	9	100	142	33
St. Louis Eagles	48	11	31	6	86	144	28

Note: W = Wins, L = Losses, T = Ties, GF = Goals For, GA = Goals Against, Pts = Points
Teams that qualified for the playoffs are highlighted in bold.

=== Record vs. opponents ===
==== vs. Canadian Division ====
1934–35 NHL records
Team	MTL	MTM	NYA	STL	TOR	Total
Mtl Canadiens	—	4–1–1	2–3–1	4–0–2	1–5	**11–9–4**
Mtl Maroons	1–4–1	—	4–1–1	5–1	1–5	**11–11–2**
NY Americans	3–2–1	1–4–1	—	0–4–2	1–4–1	**5–14–5**
St. Louis	0–4–2	1–5	4–0–2	—	0–5–1	**5–14–5**
Toronto	5–1	5–1	4–1–1	5–0–1	—	**19–3–2**

==== vs. American Division ====
1934–35 NHL records
Team	BOS	CHI	DET	NYR	Total
Mtl Canadiens	2–4	1–4–1	1–4–1	4–2	**8–14–2**
Mtl Maroons	4–1–1	3–3	3–2–1	3–2–1	**13–8–3**
NY Rangers	2–4	2–4	1–2–3	2–3–1	**7–13–4**
St. Louis	1–5	1–4–1	3–3	1–5	**6–17–1**
Toronto	2–3–1	5–1	2–3–1	2–4	**11–11–2**

== Playoffs ==
The Maroons went against Chicago and won 1 goal to 0, or 1–0. Baldy Northcott scored the only goal of the 2-game total goals series, at 4:02 of overtime in game 2 at Chicago. They went against the New York Rangers in the second round and won 2-game total goals series 5 goals to 4, or 5–4.

=== Stanley Cup Finals ===
They went against Toronto in the Final in a best-of-five series and swept them in three games, or 3–0. Tommy Gorman became the first man in NHL history to coach back to back Stanley Cup Champions for 2 different teams.

== Schedule and results ==
=== Regular season ===
1934–35 regular season
November

Game	Result	Date	Score	Opponent	Record
1	W	November 13, 1934	2–1 OT	@ St. Louis Eagles (1934–35)	1–0–0
2	L	November 15, 1934	3–4	Chicago Black Hawks (1934–35)	1–1–0
3	L	November 17, 1934	1–2	@ Toronto Maple Leafs (1934–35)	1–2–0
4	W	November 20, 1934	3–0	@ New York Americans (1934–35)	2–2–0
5	W	November 24, 1934	3–1	Montreal Canadiens (1934–35)	3–2–0
6	W	November 29, 1934	2–1	Detroit Red Wings (1934–35)	4–2–0

December

Game	Result	Date	Score	Opponent	Record
7	W	December 1, 1934	5–2	@ New York Rangers (1934–35)	5–2–0
8	W	December 6, 1934	8–2	New York Americans (1934–35)	6–2–0
9	W	December 8, 1934	1–0	St. Louis Eagles (1934–35)	7–2–0
10	L	December 11, 1934	1–4	@ Montreal Canadiens (1934–35)	7–3–0
11	L	December 13, 1934	2–4 OT	Toronto Maple Leafs (1934–35)	7–4–0
12	L	December 16, 1934	2–3	@ Chicago Black Hawks (1934–35)	7–5–0
13	T	December 20, 1934	1–1 OT	@ Detroit Red Wings (1934–35)	7–5–1
14	L	December 22, 1934	1–2	New York Rangers (1934–35)	7–6–1
15	W	December 25, 1934	5–3	@ Boston Bruins (1934–35)	8–6–1
16	W	December 27, 1934	1–0	Boston Bruins (1934–35)	9–6–1
17	W	December 29, 1934	4–2	@ Toronto Maple Leafs (1934–35)	10–6–1

January

Game	Result	Date	Score	Opponent	Record
18	W	January 1, 1935	2–1 OT	@ Chicago Black Hawks (1934–35)	11–6–1
19	W	January 3, 1935	3–0	@ St. Louis Eagles (1934–35)	12–6–1
20	L	January 5, 1935	1–2	St. Louis Eagles (1934–35)	12–7–1
21	T	January 8, 1935	1–1 OT	@ New York Rangers (1934–35)	12–7–2
22	W	January 10, 1935	4–0	Chicago Black Hawks (1934–35)	13–7–2
23	L	January 12, 1935	2–3	@ Montreal Canadiens (1934–35)	13–8–2
24	L	January 15, 1935	0–1 OT	Detroit Red Wings (1934–35)	13–9–2
25	W	January 19, 1935	8–2	New York Americans (1934–35)	14–9–2
26	L	January 22, 1935	3–4	@ Boston Bruins (1934–35)	14–10–2
27	L	January 24, 1935	1–2	Montreal Canadiens (1934–35)	14–11–2
28	W	January 29, 1935	5–2	St. Louis Eagles (1934–35)	15–11–2
29	W	January 31, 1935	2–0	@ New York Americans (1934–35)	16–11–2

February

Game	Result	Date	Score	Opponent	Record
30	W	February 2, 1935	3–1	Boston Bruins (1934–35)	17–11–2
31	L	February 5, 1935	4–5	New York Rangers (1934–35)	17–12–2
32	L	February 9, 1935	2–4	@ Toronto Maple Leafs (1934–35)	17–13–2
33	W	February 10, 1935	2–1 OT	@ Detroit Red Wings (1934–35)	18–13–2
34	W	February 12, 1935	3–0	Chicago Black Hawks (1934–35)	19–13–2
35	L	February 14, 1935	0–2	@ Montreal Canadiens (1934–35)	19–14–2
36	W	February 16, 1935	7–3	Detroit Red Wings (1934–35)	20–14–2
37	L	February 19, 1935	1–3	Toronto Maple Leafs (1934–35)	20–15–2
38	L	February 21, 1935	1–3	@ Detroit Red Wings (1934–35)	20–16–2
39	W	February 23, 1935	4–0	@ St. Louis Eagles (1934–35)	21–16–2
40	L	February 24, 1935	1–6	@ Chicago Black Hawks (1934–35)	21–17–2
41	W	February 26, 1935	3–1	New York Rangers (1934–35)	22–17–2
42	W	February 28, 1935	5–2	@ New York Rangers (1934–35)	23–17–2

March

Game	Result	Date	Score	Opponent	Record
43	T	March 2, 1935	2–2 OT	Boston Bruins (1934–35)	23–17–3
44	T	March 7, 1935	2–2 OT	Montreal Canadiens (1934–35)	23–17–4
45	L	March 10, 1935	2–4	@ New York Americans (1934–35)	23–18–4
46	L	March 12, 1935	0–1	Toronto Maple Leafs (1934–35)	23–19–4
47	T	March 16, 1935	0–0 OT	New York Americans (1934–35)	23–19–5
48	W	March 19, 1935	4–2	@ Boston Bruins (1934–35)	24–19–5

Legend: Win (2 points) Loss (0 points) Tie (1 point)

=== Playoffs ===
1935 Stanley Cup playoffs
Quarterfinals vs. (A2) Chicago Black Hawks – Maroons win 1 goal to 0 goals

Game	Result	Date	Score	Opponent	Series
1	T	March 23, 1935	0–0	Chicago Black Hawks (1934–35)	0–0–1
2	W	March 26, 1935	1–0 OT	@ Chicago Black Hawks (1934–35)	1–0–1

Semifinals vs. (A3) New York Rangers – Maroons win 5 goals to 4 goals

Game	Result	Date	Score	Opponent	Series
1	W	March 28, 1935	2–1	@ New York Rangers (1934–35)	1–0–0
2	T	March 30, 1935	3–3	New York Rangers (1934–35)	1–0–1

Stanley Cup Finals vs. (C1) Toronto Maple Leafs – Maroons win 3–0

Game	Result	Date	Score	Opponent	Series
1	W	April 4, 1935	3–2 OT	@ Toronto Maple Leafs (1934–35)	1–0
2	W	April 6, 1935	3–1	@ Toronto Maple Leafs (1934–35)	2–0
3	W	April 9, 1935	4–1	Toronto Maple Leafs (1934–35)	3–0

Legend: Win Loss Tie

== Player statistics ==
=== Regular season ===
Scoring

Player	Pos	GP	G	A	Pts	PIM
Earl Robinson	RW/C	48	17	18	35	23
Herb Cain	LW	44	20	7	27	13
Russ Blinco	C	48	13	14	27	4
Hooley Smith	C/RW	46	5	22	27	41
Baldy Northcott	D/LW	47	9	14	23	44
Dave Trottier	LW	34	10	9	19	22
Bob Gracie	C/LW	32	10	8	18	11
Gus Marker	RW	44	11	4	15	18
Jimmy Ward	RW	41	9	6	15	24
Cy Wentworth	D	48	4	9	13	28
Stewart Evans	D	46	5	7	12	54
Al Shields	D	42	4	8	12	45
Lionel Conacher	D	38	2	6	8	44
Dutch Gainor	C	35	0	4	4	2
Bill Miller	C/D	22	3	0	3	2
Paul Haynes	C	11	1	2	3	0
Sammy McManus	LW	25	0	1	1	8
Toe Blake	LW	8	0	0	0	0
Alec Connell	G	48	0	0	0	0
Bill MacKenzie	D	5	0	0	0	0
Aubrey Webster	RW	4	0	0	0	0

Goaltending

Player	MIN	GP	W	L	T	GA	GAA	SO
Alec Connell	2970	48	24	19	5	92	1.86	9
Team:	2970	48	24	19	5	92	1.86	9

=== Playoffs ===
Scoring

Player	Pos	GP	G	A	Pts	PIM
Baldy Northcott	D/LW	7	4	1	5	0
Cy Wentworth	D	7	3	2	5	0
Russ Blinco	C	7	2	2	4	2
Earl Robinson	RW/C	7	2	2	4	0
Dave Trottier	LW	7	2	1	3	4
Gus Marker	RW	7	1	1	2	4
Jimmy Ward	RW	7	1	1	2	0
Bob Gracie	C/LW	7	0	2	2	2
Herb Cain	LW	7	1	0	1	2
Al Shields	D	7	0	1	1	6
Toe Blake	LW	1	0	0	0	0
Lionel Conacher	D	7	0	0	0	14
Alec Connell	G	7	0	0	0	0
Stewart Evans	D	7	0	0	0	8
Sammy McManus	LW	1	0	0	0	0
Bill Miller	C/D	7	0	0	0	0
Hooley Smith	C/RW	6	0	0	0	14

Goaltending

Player	MIN	GP	W	L	GA	GAA	SO
Alec Connell	429	7	5	0	8	1.12	2
Team:	429	7	5	0	8	1.12	2

Note: GP = Games played; G = Goals; A = Assists; Pts = Points; +/- = Plus/minus; PIM = Penalty minutes; PPG = Power-play goals; SHG = Short-handed goals; GWG = Game-winning goals
MIN=Minutes played; W = Wins; L = Losses; T = Ties; GA = Goals against; GAA = Goals against average; SO = Shutouts;

== Transactions ==
=== Trades ===
Date	Details		Ref
October 3, 1934	To Montreal Canadiens Rights to Nels Crutchfield	To Montreal Maroons Lionel Conacher	
