= 1934–35 New York Americans season =

National Hockey League team season

1934–35 New York Americans
- Division: 4th Canadian
- 1934–35 record: 12–27–9
- Home record: 7–13–4
- Road record: 5–14–5
- Goals for: 100
- Goals against: 142

Team information
- Coach: Joe Simpson
- Captain: Red Dutton
- Arena: Madison Square Garden

Team leaders
- Goals: Sweeney Schriner (18)
- Assists: Art Chapman (34)
- Points: Art Chapman (43)
- Penalty minutes: Alex Smith; Red Dutton (46)
- Wins: Roy Worters (12)
- Goals against average: Roy Worters (2.84)

The 1934–35 New York Americans season was the Americans' 10th season of play. The Americans did not qualify for the playoffs.

== Regular season ==
=== Final standings ===
Canadian Division
	GP	W	L	T	GF	GA	PTS
**Toronto Maple Leafs**	48	30	14	4	157	111	64
**Montreal Maroons**	48	24	19	5	123	92	53
**Montreal Canadiens**	48	19	23	6	110	145	44
New York Americans	48	12	27	9	100	142	33
St. Louis Eagles	48	11	31	6	86	144	28

Note: W = Wins, L = Losses, T = Ties, GF = Goals For, GA = Goals Against, Pts = Points
Teams that qualified for the playoffs are highlighted in bold.

=== Record vs. opponents ===
==== vs. Canadian Division ====
1934–35 NHL records
Team	MTL	MTM	NYA	STL	TOR	Total
Mtl Canadiens	—	4–1–1	2–3–1	4–0–2	1–5	**11–9–4**
Mtl Maroons	1–4–1	—	4–1–1	5–1	1–5	**11–11–2**
NY Americans	3–2–1	1–4–1	—	0–4–2	1–4–1	**5–14–5**
St. Louis	0–4–2	1–5	4–0–2	—	0–5–1	**5–14–5**
Toronto	5–1	5–1	4–1–1	5–0–1	—	**19–3–2**

==== vs. American Division ====
1934–35 NHL records
Team	BOS	CHI	DET	NYR	Total
Mtl Canadiens	2–4	1–4–1	1–4–1	4–2	**8–14–2**
Mtl Maroons	4–1–1	3–3	3–2–1	3–2–1	**13–8–3**
NY Rangers	2–4	2–4	1–2–3	2–3–1	**7–13–4**
St. Louis	1–5	1–4–1	3–3	1–5	**6–17–1**
Toronto	2–3–1	5–1	2–3–1	2–4	**11–11–2**

== Schedule and results ==
1934–35 regular season
November

Game	Result	Date	Score	Opponent	Record
1	L	November 15, 1934	0–1	Toronto Maple Leafs (1934–35)	0–1–0
2	L	November 20, 1934	0–3	Montreal Maroons (1934–35)	0–2–0
3	W	November 22, 1934	4–3	@ Montreal Canadiens (1934–35)	1–2–0
4	W	November 25, 1934	3–1	New York Rangers (1934–35)	2–2–0
5	W	November 29, 1934	2–0	Chicago Black Hawks (1934–35)	3–2–0

December

Game	Result	Date	Score	Opponent	Record
6	W	December 2, 1934	2–1	@ Chicago Black Hawks (1934–35)	4–2–0
7	L	December 4, 1934	0–2	@ St. Louis Eagles (1934–35)	4–3–0
8	L	December 6, 1934	2–8	@ Montreal Maroons (1934–35)	4–4–0
9	T	December 9, 1934	2–2 OT	Montreal Canadiens (1934–35)	4–4–1
10	L	December 11, 1934	3–4	@ Boston Bruins (1934–35)	4–5–1
11	W	December 13, 1934	4–3 OT	Boston Bruins (1934–35)	5–5–1
12	L	December 15, 1934	3–4	@ Toronto Maple Leafs (1934–35)	5–6–1
13	T	December 16, 1934	2–2 OT	@ Detroit Red Wings (1934–35)	5–6–2
14	L	December 18, 1934	1–2 OT	St. Louis Eagles (1934–35)	5–7–2
15	L	December 23, 1934	1–2	Detroit Red Wings (1934–35)	5–8–2
16	L	December 25, 1934	1–3	@ New York Rangers (1934–35)	5–9–2
17	L	December 27, 1934	3–4 OT	Toronto Maple Leafs (1934–35)	5–10–2
18	W	December 29, 1934	3–1	@ Montreal Canadiens (1934–35)	6–10–2
19	T	December 30, 1934	0–0 OT	@ Detroit Red Wings (1934–35)	6–10–3

January

Game	Result	Date	Score	Opponent	Record
20	W	January 1, 1935	5–3	Montreal Canadiens (1934–35)	7–10–3
21	L	January 6, 1935	1–2	Chicago Black Hawks (1934–35)	7–11–3
22	T	January 10, 1935	5–5 OT	Toronto Maple Leafs (1934–35)	7–11–4
23	L	January 12, 1935	1–3	New York Rangers (1934–35)	7–12–4
24	T	January 15, 1935	1–1 OT	@ New York Rangers (1934–35)	7–12–5
25	T	January 17, 1935	3–3 OT	Detroit Red Wings (1934–35)	7–12–6
26	L	January 19, 1935	2–8	@ Montreal Maroons (1934–35)	7–13–6
27	L	January 22, 1935	0–2	Chicago Black Hawks (1934–35)	7–14–6
28	T	January 24, 1935	2–2 OT	@ St. Louis Eagles (1934–35)	7–14–7
29	L	January 27, 1935	2–4	New York Rangers (1934–35)	7–15–7
30	L	January 29, 1935	0–4	@ Boston Bruins (1934–35)	7–16–7
31	L	January 31, 1935	0–2	Montreal Maroons (1934–35)	7–17–7

February

Game	Result	Date	Score	Opponent	Record
32	W	February 2, 1935	2–1	@ Toronto Maple Leafs (1934–35)	8–17–7
33	L	February 3, 1935	2–3	@ Chicago Black Hawks (1934–35)	8–18–7
34	T	February 5, 1935	3–3 OT	St. Louis Eagles (1934–35)	8–18–8
35	W	February 7, 1935	6–4	@ New York Rangers (1934–35)	9–18–8
36	W	February 10, 1935	7–5	Boston Bruins (1934–35)	10–18–8
37	L	February 17, 1935	1–3	Montreal Canadiens (1934–35)	10–19–8
38	L	February 21, 1935	3–4	St. Louis Eagles (1934–35)	10–20–8
39	L	February 23, 1935	2–4	@ Montreal Canadiens (1934–35)	10–21–8
40	W	February 26, 1935	3–2	Detroit Red Wings (1934–35)	11–21–8

March

Game	Result	Date	Score	Opponent	Record
41	L	March 2, 1935	0–6	@ Toronto Maple Leafs (1934–35)	11–22–8
42	L	March 3, 1935	1–3 OT	@ Detroit Red Wings (1934–35)	11–23–8
43	L	March 5, 1935	1–5	@ Chicago Black Hawks (1934–35)	11–24–8
44	L	March 7, 1935	2–3	@ St. Louis Eagles (1934–35)	11–25–8
45	W	March 10, 1935	4–2	Montreal Maroons (1934–35)	12–25–8
46	L	March 12, 1935	1–4	@ Boston Bruins (1934–35)	12–26–8
47	L	March 14, 1935	4–5	Boston Bruins (1934–35)	12–27–8
48	T	March 16, 1935	0–0 OT	@ Montreal Maroons (1934–35)	12–27–9

Legend: Win (2 points) Loss (0 points) Tie (1 point)

== Player stats ==
=== Regular season ===
Scoring

Player	GP	G	A	Pts	PIM
Art Chapman	47	9	34	43	4
Sweeney Schriner	48	18	22	40	6
Lorne Carr	48	17	14	31	14
Charley McVeigh	47	7	11	18	4
Normie Himes	40	5	13	18	2
Harry Oliver	47	7	9	16	4
Red Conn	48	5	11	16	10
Eddie Burke	29	4	10	14	15
Alex Smith	48	3	8	11	46
Lloyd Klein	29	7	3	10	9
Red Dutton	48	3	7	10	46
Bill Brydge	47	2	6	8	29
Obs Heximer	17	5	2	7	0
Fred Hergerts	19	2	4	6	2
Hap Emms	28	2	2	4	19
Bob Gracie	14	2	1	3	4
Allan Murray	43	2	1	3	36
Walter Jackson	1	0	0	0	0
Roy Worters	48	0	0	0	0

Goaltending

Player	MIN	GP	W	L	T	GA	GAA	SA	SV	SV%	SO
Roy Worters	3000	48	12	27	9	142	2.84				3
Team:	3000	48	12	27	9	142	2.84				3

== See also ==
- 1934–35 NHL season
