= 1934–35 Toronto Maple Leafs season =

NHL hockey team season

1934–35 Toronto Maple Leafs
- Division: 1st Canadian
- 1934–35 record: 30–14–4
- Home record: 16–6–2
- Road record: 14–8–2
- Goals for: 157
- Goals against: 111

Team information
- General manager: Conn Smythe
- Coach: Dick Irvin
- Captain: Hap Day
- Arena: Maple Leaf Gardens

Team leaders
- Goals: Charlie Conacher (36)
- Assists: Busher Jackson (22)
- Points: Charlie Conacher (57)
- Penalty minutes: Red Horner (125)
- Wins: George Hainsworth (30)
- Goals against average: George Hainsworth (2.25)

The 1934–35 Toronto Maple Leafs season was Toronto's 18th season of play in the National Hockey League (NHL). The Maple Leafs placed first in the Canadian Division, and won two playoff series to advance to the Stanley Cup Finals, only to lose to the Montreal Maroons.

== Regular season ==
=== Final standings ===
Canadian Division
	GP	W	L	T	GF	GA	PTS
**Toronto Maple Leafs**	48	30	14	4	157	111	64
**Montreal Maroons**	48	24	19	5	123	92	53
**Montreal Canadiens**	48	19	23	6	110	145	44
New York Americans	48	12	27	9	100	142	33
St. Louis Eagles	48	11	31	6	86	144	28

Note: W = Wins, L = Losses, T = Ties, GF = Goals For, GA = Goals Against, Pts = Points
Teams that qualified for the playoffs are highlighted in bold.

=== Record vs. opponents ===
==== vs. Canadian Division ====
1934–35 NHL records
Team	MTL	MTM	NYA	STL	TOR	Total
Mtl Canadiens	—	4–1–1	2–3–1	4–0–2	1–5	**11–9–4**
Mtl Maroons	1–4–1	—	4–1–1	5–1	1–5	**11–11–2**
NY Americans	3–2–1	1–4–1	—	0–4–2	1–4–1	**5–14–5**
St. Louis	0–4–2	1–5	4–0–2	—	0–5–1	**5–14–5**
Toronto	5–1	5–1	4–1–1	5–0–1	—	**19–3–2**

==== vs. American Division ====
1934–35 NHL records
Team	BOS	CHI	DET	NYR	Total
Mtl Canadiens	2–4	1–4–1	1–4–1	4–2	**8–14–2**
Mtl Maroons	4–1–1	3–3	3–2–1	3–2–1	**13–8–3**
NY Rangers	2–4	2–4	1–2–3	2–3–1	**7–13–4**
St. Louis	1–5	1–4–1	3–3	1–5	**6–17–1**
Toronto	2–3–1	5–1	2–3–1	2–4	**11–11–2**

== Schedule and results ==
1934–35 regular season
November

Game	Result	Date	Score	Opponent	Record
1	W	November 8, 1934	5–3	Boston Bruins (1934–35)	1–0–0
2	W	November 10, 1934	2–1 OT	Montreal Canadiens (1934–35)	2–0–0
3	W	November 15, 1934	1–0	@ New York Americans (1934–35)	3–0–0
4	W	November 17, 1934	2–1	Montreal Maroons (1934–35)	4–0–0
5	W	November 18, 1934	5–0	@ Chicago Black Hawks (1934–35)	5–0–0
6	W	November 20, 1934	5–2	@ St. Louis Eagles (1934–35)	6–0–0
7	W	November 24, 1934	3–2	Detroit Red Wings (1934–35)	7–0–0

December

Game	Result	Date	Score	Opponent	Record
8	W	December 1, 1934	4–3	St. Louis Eagles (1934–35)	8–0–0
9	L	December 2, 1934	0–3	@ Detroit Red Wings (1934–35)	8–1–0
10	W	December 4, 1934	1–0	@ Boston Bruins (1934–35)	9–1–0
11	L	December 8, 1934	2–5	New York Rangers (1934–35)	9–2–0
12	W	December 11, 1934	8–4	@ New York Rangers (1934–35)	10–2–0
13	W	December 13, 1934	4–2 OT	@ Montreal Maroons (1934–35)	11–2–0
14	W	December 15, 1934	4–3	New York Americans (1934–35)	12–2–0
15	T	December 20, 1934	1–1 OT	@ St. Louis Eagles (1934–35)	12–2–1
16	W	December 22, 1934	1–0	Chicago Black Hawks (1934–35)	13–2–1
17	W	December 25, 1934	6–2	@ Montreal Canadiens (1934–35)	14–2–1
18	W	December 27, 1934	4–3 OT	@ New York Americans (1934–35)	15–2–1
19	L	December 29, 1934	2–4	Montreal Maroons (1934–35)	15–3–1

January

Game	Result	Date	Score	Opponent	Record
20	L	January 1, 1935	0–1	Detroit Red Wings (1934–35)	15–4–1
21	W	January 5, 1935	3–1	Montreal Canadiens (1934–35)	16–4–1
22	L	January 8, 1935	1–3	@ Boston Bruins (1934–35)	16–5–1
23	T	January 10, 1935	5–5 OT	@ New York Americans (1934–35)	16–5–2
24	W	January 12, 1935	5–1	Chicago Black Hawks (1934–35)	17–5–2
25	W	January 13, 1935	2–0	@ Detroit Red Wings (1934–35)	18–5–2
26	W	January 15, 1935	3–2	@ Chicago Black Hawks (1934–35)	19–5–2
27	L	January 17, 1935	3–4	@ Montreal Canadiens (1934–35)	19–6–2
28	W	January 19, 1935	6–2	St. Louis Eagles (1934–35)	20–6–2
29	L	January 20, 1935	1–2	@ Chicago Black Hawks (1934–35)	20–7–2
30	W	January 22, 1935	2–1	@ St. Louis Eagles (1934–35)	21–7–2
31	T	January 26, 1935	0–0 OT	Detroit Red Wings (1934–35)	21–7–3
32	L	January 29, 1935	5–7	@ New York Rangers (1934–35)	21–8–3
33	L	January 31, 1935	2–3	New York Rangers (1934–35)	21–9–3

February

Game	Result	Date	Score	Opponent	Record
34	L	February 2, 1935	1–2	New York Americans (1934–35)	21–10–3
35	T	February 7, 1935	4–4 OT	Boston Bruins (1934–35)	21–10–4
36	W	February 9, 1935	4–2	Montreal Maroons (1934–35)	22–10–4
37	L	February 12, 1935	5–6 OT	@ Boston Bruins (1934–35)	22–11–4
38	L	February 14, 1935	0–3	@ New York Rangers (1934–35)	22–12–4
39	W	February 16, 1935	5–1	New York Rangers (1934–35)	23–12–4
40	W	February 19, 1935	3–1	@ Montreal Maroons (1934–35)	24–12–4
41	W	February 23, 1935	4–1	Chicago Black Hawks (1934–35)	25–12–4
42	L	February 24, 1935	2–4	@ Detroit Red Wings (1934–35)	25–13–4

March

Game	Result	Date	Score	Opponent	Record
43	W	March 2, 1935	6–0	New York Americans (1934–35)	26–13–4
44	W	March 5, 1935	10–3	@ Montreal Canadiens (1934–35)	27–13–4
45	L	March 9, 1935	4–7	Boston Bruins (1934–35)	27–14–4
46	W	March 12, 1935	1–0	@ Montreal Maroons (1934–35)	28–14–4
47	W	March 16, 1935	5–3	Montreal Canadiens (1934–35)	29–14–4
48	W	March 19, 1935	5–3	St. Louis Eagles (1934–35)	30–14–4

Legend: Win (2 points) Loss (0 points) Tie (1 point)

== Playoffs ==
The Maple Leafs played the Boston Bruins in the second round in a best of five series and won 3–1. In the finals against the Montreal Maroons, they lost a best of five series 3–1.

== Player statistics ==
=== Regular season ===
Scoring

Player	Pos	GP	G	A	Pts	PIM
Charlie Conacher	RW	47	36	21	57	24
Busher Jackson	LW	42	22	22	44	27
Joe Primeau	C	37	10	20	30	16
Flash Hollett	D	48	10	16	26	38
Baldy Cotton	LW	47	11	14	25	36
Hec Kilrea	LW	46	11	13	24	16
Bill Thoms	C	47	9	13	22	15
King Clancy	D	47	5	16	21	53
Andy Blair	C	45	6	14	20	22
Pep Kelly	RW	47	11	8	19	14
Buzz Boll	LW	47	14	4	18	4
Red Horner	D	46	4	8	12	125
Hap Day	D	45	2	4	6	38
Ken Doraty	F	11	1	4	5	0
Nick Metz	LW	18	2	2	4	4
Art Jackson	C	20	1	3	4	4
Frank Finnigan	RW	11	2	0	2	2
Bob Davidson	LW	5	0	0	0	6
George Hainsworth	G	48	0	0	0	0

Goaltending

Player	MIN	GP	W	L	T	GA	GAA	SO
George Hainsworth	2957	48	30	14	4	111	2.25	8
Charlie Conacher	3	1	0	0	0	0	0.00	0
Team:	2960	48	30	14	4	111	2.25	8

=== Playoffs ===
Scoring

Player	Pos	GP	G	A	Pts	PIM
Busher Jackson	LW	7	3	2	5	2
Charlie Conacher	RW	7	1	4	5	6
Frank Finnigan	RW	7	1	2	3	2
Joe Primeau	C	7	0	3	3	0
Pep Kelly	RW	7	2	0	2	4
Bill Thoms	C	7	2	0	2	0
Nick Metz	LW	6	1	1	2	0
King Clancy	D	7	1	0	1	8
Red Horner	D	7	0	1	1	4
Andy Blair	C	2	0	0	0	2
Buzz Boll	LW	6	0	0	0	0
Baldy Cotton	LW	7	0	0	0	17
Hap Day	D	7	0	0	0	4
Ken Doraty	F	1	0	0	0	0
George Hainsworth	G	7	0	0	0	0
Flash Hollett	D	7	0	0	0	6
Art Jackson	C	1	0	0	0	2
Hec Kilrea	LW	6	0	0	0	4

Goaltending

Player	MIN	GP	W	L	GA	GAA	SO
George Hainsworth	460	7	3	4	12	1.57	2
Team:	460	7	3	4	12	1.57	2

Note:

Pos = Position;GP = Games played; G = Goals; A = Assists; Pts = Points; PIM = Penalty minutes; +/- = Plus/minus; PPG = Power-play goals; SHG = Short-handed goals; GWG = Game-winning goals
Pos = Position;GP = Games played; Min, TOI = Minutes played; W = Wins; L = Losses; T,T/OT = Ties; OTL = Overtime losses; GA = Goals-against; GAA = Goals-against average; SO = Shutouts; SA = Shots against; SV = Shots saved;SV% = Save percentage;

== Transactions ==
- May 12, 1934: Traded Charlie Sands to the Boston Bruins for cash
- May 12, 1934: Loaned Jack Shill to the Boston Bruins for the 1934–35 season
- October 30, 1934: Signed Free Agent Phil Stein
- January 8, 1935: Lost Free Agent Earl Miller to the Buffalo Bisons of the IHL
- February 13, 1935: Acquired Frank Finnigan from the St. Louis Eagles for cash

== See also ==
- 1934–35 NHL season
