= 1934–35 St. Louis Eagles season =

National Hockey League team season

1934–35 St. Louis Eagles
- Division: 5th Canadian
- 1934–35 record: 11–31–6
- Home record: 7–14–3
- Road record: 4–17–3
- Goals for: 86
- Goals against: 144

Team information
- Coach: Eddie Gerard (Oct. 1934 – Dec. 1934); Buck Boucher (Dec. 1934 – Mar. 1935)
- Captain: Syd Howe
- Arena: St. Louis Arena

Team leaders
- Goals: Syd Howe (14)
- Assists: Carl Voss; Glen Brydson (18)
- Points: Carl Voss (31)
- Penalty minutes: Irv Frew (89)
- Wins: Bill Beveridge (11)
- Goals against average: Bill Beveridge (2.89)

The 1934–35 St. Louis Eagles season was the Eagles' only season in the National Hockey League (NHL). The Eagles finished last in the Canadian Division and did not qualify for the playoffs. The team made a coaching change, replacing Eddie Gerard after a 2–11 start, with Buck Boucher, who could not turn the team around.

The Ottawa Senators relocated their NHL franchise and players to St. Louis in the summer of 1934 due to financial losses in Ottawa. Despite good attendance at the St. Louis Arena, the Eagles would have financial problems, due to travel costs. The Eagles would take the Senators' spot in the Canadian Division, and would face numerous road trips to Montreal and Toronto throughout the season, despite being closer to Chicago and Detroit, who played in the American Division. The Eagles were forced to sell players, such as Syd Howe and Frank Finnigan. After the season, the NHL bought the franchise and dispersed its players.

== Off-season ==
The St. Louis Arena had an ice surface that was 215 feet (66 m) × 115 feet (35 m), reputedly the "largest ice surface in the world". The rink was cut down to the league standard 75 feet (23 m) wide, but left 215 feet (66 m), leaving a neutral zone of 75 feet (23 m). It was the largest ice surface in the NHL.

== Regular season ==
The first NHL game in St. Louis was played on November 8, 1934, against the Chicago Black Hawks with a paid attendance of 12,622. The Eagles lost 3–1 and their only goal was scored by Earl Roche.

The Eagles were led offensively by Carl Voss and his team-leading 31 points, team captain Syd Howe would lead the club with 14 goals, despite being traded to the Detroit Red Wings late in the season, while Glen Brydson would finish second in team scoring with 29 points. Frank Jerwa, acquired from the Boston Bruins, would lead the defense with 11 points in 16 games in St. Louis.

Bill Beveridge was the Eagles' only goaltender, winning 11 games with a 2.89 goals against average (GAA) and 3 shutouts.

The strain of so many long train rides showed early on. Midway through the season, new head coach and former Senators player Eddie Gerard was relieved of his duties after a 2–11–0 start and was replaced by Buck Boucher, who was the head coach of the Senators the previous season. Boucher would post a 9–20–6 record in 35 games. The Eagles finished the season last in the NHL with a 11–31–6 record and a .292 winning percentage.

After the season, the franchise owners asked permission to suspend operations for a year. Instead, the NHL bought the players' contracts for US$40,000 and dispersed the players to other NHL teams. The NHL took back the franchise, on the condition that if it were resold, the original franchisees would share in the proceeds.

The Montreal Maroons nearly relocated to St. Louis in 1938, but the NHL nixed the move. St. Louis would be without an NHL team until the 1967–68 season, when the league expanded from 6 teams to 12, and granted the St. Louis Blues a place in the NHL.

=== Final standings ===
Canadian Division
	GP	W	L	T	GF	GA	PTS
**Toronto Maple Leafs**	48	30	14	4	157	111	64
**Montreal Maroons**	48	24	19	5	123	92	53
**Montreal Canadiens**	48	19	23	6	110	145	44
New York Americans	48	12	27	9	100	142	33
St. Louis Eagles	48	11	31	6	86	144	28

Note: W = Wins, L = Losses, T = Ties, GF = Goals For, GA = Goals Against, Pts = Points
Teams that qualified for the playoffs are highlighted in bold.

=== Record vs. opponents ===
==== vs. Canadian Division ====
1934–35 NHL records
Team	MTL	MTM	NYA	STL	TOR	Total
Mtl Canadiens	—	4–1–1	2–3–1	4–0–2	1–5	**11–9–4**
Mtl Maroons	1–4–1	—	4–1–1	5–1	1–5	**11–11–2**
NY Americans	3–2–1	1–4–1	—	0–4–2	1–4–1	**5–14–5**
St. Louis	0–4–2	1–5	4–0–2	—	0–5–1	**5–14–5**
Toronto	5–1	5–1	4–1–1	5–0–1	—	**19–3–2**

==== vs. American Division ====
1934–35 NHL records
Team	BOS	CHI	DET	NYR	Total
Mtl Canadiens	2–4	1–4–1	1–4–1	4–2	**8–14–2**
Mtl Maroons	4–1–1	3–3	3–2–1	3–2–1	**13–8–3**
NY Rangers	2–4	2–4	1–2–3	2–3–1	**7–13–4**
St. Louis	1–5	1–4–1	3–3	1–5	**6–17–1**
Toronto	2–3–1	5–1	2–3–1	2–4	**11–11–2**

== Schedule and results ==
1934–35 regular season
November: 1–8–0 (home: 1–4–0; road: 0–4–0)

Game	Date	Visitor	Score	Home	OT	Decision	Arena	Record	Pts
1	November 8	Chicago	3–1	St. Louis		Beveridge	St. Louis Arena	0–1–0	0
2	November 10	NY Rangers	2–4	St. Louis		Beveridge	St. Louis Arena	1–1–0	2
3	November 13	Mtl Maroons	2–1	St. Louis	OT	Beveridge	St. Louis Arena	1–2–0	2
4	November 17	St. Louis	0–1	Boston		Beveridge	Boston Garden	1–3–0	2
5	November 18	St. Louis	0–5	NY Rangers		Beveridge	Madison Square Garden	1–4–0	2
6	November 20	Toronto	5–2	St. Louis		Beveridge	St. Louis Arena	1–5–0	2
7	November 22	St. Louis	0–1	Chicago		Beveridge	Chicago Stadium	1–6–0	2
8	November 24	Boston	4–1	St. Louis		Beveridge	St. Louis Arena	1–7–0	2
9	November 25	St. Louis	1–4	Detroit		Beveridge	Detroit Olympia	1–8–0	2

December: 3–5–3 (home: 2–2–1; road: 1–3–2)

Game	Date	Visitor	Score	Home	OT	Decision	Arena	Record	Pts
10	December 1	St. Louis	3–4	Toronto		Beveridge	Maple Leaf Gardens	1–9–0	2
11	December 4	NY Americans	0–2	St. Louis		Beveridge	St. Louis Arena	2–9–0	4
12	December 8	St. Louis	0–1	Mtl Maroons		Beveridge	Montreal Forum	2–10–0	4
13	December 9	St. Louis	1–3	Detroit		Beveridge	Detroit Olympia	2–11–0	4
14	December 13	Detroit	11–2	St. Louis		Beveridge	St. Louis Arena	2–12–0	4
15	December 15	St. Louis	1–1	Mtl Canadiens	OT	Beveridge	Montreal Forum	2–12–1	5
16	December 18	St. Louis	2–1	NY Americans	OT	Beveridge	Madison Square Garden	3–12–1	7
17	December 20	Toronto	1–1	St. Louis	OT	Beveridge	St. Louis Arena	3–12–2	8
18	December 22	Mtl Canadiens	2–1	St. Louis		Beveridge	St. Louis Arena	3–13–2	8
19	December 27	Detroit	2–5	St. Louis		Beveridge	St. Louis Arena	4–13–2	10
20	December 30	St. Louis	3–3	Chicago	OT	Beveridge	Chicago Stadium	4–13–3	11

January: 2–9–1 (home: 0–4–1; road: 2–5–0)

Game	Date	Visitor	Score	Home	OT	Decision	Arena	Record	Pts
21	January 3	Mtl Maroons	3–0	St. Louis		Beveridge	St. Louis Arena	4–14–3	11
22	January 5	St. Louis	2–1	Mtl Maroons		Beveridge	Montreal Forum	5–14–3	13
23	January 10	Boston	2–1	St. Louis		Beveridge	St. Louis Arena	5–15–3	13
24	January 13	St. Louis	2–3	NY Rangers		Beveridge	Madison Square Garden	5–16–3	13
25	January 15	St. Louis	3–5	Boston		Beveridge	Boston Garden	5–17–3	13
26	January 17	Chicago	5–1	St. Louis		Beveridge	St. Louis Arena	5–18–3	13
27	January 19	St. Louis	2–6	Toronto		Beveridge	Maple Leaf Gardens	5–19–3	13
28	January 20	St. Louis	6–1	Detroit		Beveridge	Detroit Olympia	6–19–3	15
29	January 22	Toronto	2–1	St. Louis		Beveridge	St. Louis Arena	6–20–3	15
30	January 24	NY Americans	2–2	St. Louis	OT	Beveridge	St. Louis Arena	6–20–4	16
31	January 27	St. Louis	3–5	Chicago		Beveridge	Chicago Stadium	6–21–4	16
32	January 29	St. Louis	2–5	Mtl Maroons		Beveridge	Montreal Forum	6–22–4	16

February: 3–6–2 (home: 2–2–1; road: 1–4–1)

Game	Date	Visitor	Score	Home	OT	Decision	Arena	Record	Pts
33	February 2	Mtl Canadiens	1–1	St. Louis	OT	Beveridge	St. Louis Arena	6–22–5	17
34	February 5	St. Louis	3–3	NY Americans	OT	Beveridge	Madison Square Garden	6–22–6	18
35	February 7	Chicago	0–1	St. Louis	OT	Beveridge	St. Louis Arena	7–22–6	20
36	February 9	St. Louis	2–4	Mtl Canadiens		Beveridge	Montreal Forum	7–23–6	20
37	February 12	NY Rangers	5–1	St. Louis		Beveridge	St. Louis Arena	7–24–6	20
38	February 16	Boston	0–3	St. Louis		Beveridge	St. Louis Arena	8–24–6	22
39	February 19	St. Louis	1–2	NY Rangers		Beveridge	Madison Square Garden	8–25–6	22
40	February 21	St. Louis	4–3	NY Americans		Beveridge	Madison Square Garden	9–25–6	24
41	February 23	Mtl Maroons	4–0	St. Louis		Beveridge	St. Louis Arena	9–26–6	22
42	February 26	St. Louis	0–5	Boston		Beveridge	Boston Garden	9–27–6	24
43	February 28	St. Louis	2–4	Mtl Canadiens		Beveridge	Montreal Forum	9–28–6	24

March: 2–3–0 (home: 2–2–0; road: 0–1–0)

Game	Date	Visitor	Score	Home	OT	Decision	Arena	Record	Pts
44	March 2	Mtl Canadiens	3–2	St. Louis		Beveridge	St. Louis Arena	9–29–6	24
45	March 7	NY Americans	2–3	St. Louis		Beveridge	St. Louis Arena	10–29–6	26
46	March 9	NY Rangers	5–1	St. Louis		Beveridge	St. Louis Arena	10–30–6	26
47	March 12	Detroit	2–3	St. Louis		Beveridge	St. Louis Arena	11–30–6	28
48	March 19	St. Louis	3–5	Toronto		Beveridge	Maple Leaf Gardens	11–31–6	28

Legend: Win (2 points) Loss (0 points) Tie (1 point)

== Player statistics ==
=== Skaters ===
Regular season
Player	Pos	GP	G	A	Pts	PIM
Carl Voss	C	48	13	18	31	14
Glen Brydson	RW	48	11	18	29	45
Syd Howe^{‡}	C	36	14	13	27	23
Joe Lamb^{†}	RW	31	11	12	23	19
Pete Kelly	RW	25	3	10	13	14
Bill Cowley	C	41	5	7	12	10
Ossie Asmundson^{†}	C	11	4	7	11	2
Frank Jerwa^{†}	LW	16	4	7	11	14
Frank Finnigan^{‡}	RW	34	5	5	10	10
Earl Roche^{‡}	LW	19	3	3	6	2
Vic Ripley^{†}	LW	31	1	5	6	8
Nick Wasnie	RW	13	3	1	4	2
Vernon Ayres	D	47	2	2	4	60
Ralph Bowman^{‡}	D	31	2	2	4	47
Gerry Shannon^{‡}	LW	26	2	2	4	11
Fido Purpur	RW	25	1	2	3	8
Mickey Blake	LW	8	1	1	2	2
Irv Frew	D	48	0	2	2	89
Ed Finnigan	LW	12	1	0	1	2
Gene Carrigan	C	4	0	1	1	0
Bud Cook	C	4	0	0	0	0
Ted Graham^{†}	D	12	0	0	0	2
Walter Kalbfleisch	D	3	0	0	0	6
Max Kaminsky^{‡}	C	11	0	0	0	0
George Patterson^{†}	LW	11	0	0	0	2
Des Roche^{‡}	RW	7	0	0	0	10
Archie Wilcox	RW	8	0	0	0	0
Burr Williams^{‡}	D	9	0	0	0	6

=== Goaltenders ===
Regular season
Player	GP	GS	TOI	W	L	T	GA	GAA	SO	G	A	PIM
Bill Beveridge	48	48	2,990:00	11	31	6	144	2.89	3	0	0	0

- ^{†} Denotes player spent time with another team before joining the Eagles. Stats reflect time with the Eagles only.
- ^{‡} Denotes player was traded mid-season. Stats reflect time with the Eagles only.

== See also ==
- 1934–35 NHL season
