= Walter Jackson (ice hockey) =

Canadian ice hockey player

Red Jackson
- Born: June 3, 1908 Ibstock, England, UK
- Died: October 6, 1982 (aged 74) Winnipeg, Manitoba, Canada
- Height: 5 ft 8 in (173 cm)
- Weight: 164 lb (74 kg; 11 st 10 lb)
- Position: Left wing
- Shot: Left
- Played for: Boston Bruins; New York Americans
- Playing career: 1930–1942

Walter "Red" Jackson (June 3, 1908 – October 6, 1982) was a Canadian professional ice hockey winger.

== Background ==
Jackson was born in Ibstock, England, United Kingdom, but moved to Winnipeg, Manitoba as a child. He played 84 games in the National Hockey League as a member of the Boston Bruins and New York Americans between 1932 and 1936.

Jackson died in 1982.

== Career statistics ==
=== Regular season and playoffs ===
| | | | Regular season | | | | | Playoffs |
| Season | Team | League | GP | G | A | Pts | PIM | GP | G | A | Pts | PIM |
|---|---|---|---|---|---|---|---|---|---|---|---|---|
| 1927–28 | Winnipeg CPR | WSrHL | 9 | 4 | 1 | 5 | 8 | — | — | — | — | — |
| 1928–29 | Winnipeg CPR | WSrHL | 8 | 3 | 3 | 6 | 10 | 3 | 1 | 0 | 1 | 0 |
| 1928–29 | Winnipeg CPR | M-Cup | — | — | — | — | — | 5 | 5 | 3 | 8 | 0 |
| 1929–30 | Elmswood Maple Leafs | WSrHL | 12 | 8 | 2 | 10 | 2 | 7 | 5 | 3 | 8 | 4 |
| 1929–30 | Elmswood Maple Leafs | Al-Cup | — | — | — | — | — | 5 | 4 | 3 | 7 | 4 |
| 1930–31 | St. Louis Flyers | AHA | 36 | 11 | 7 | 18 | 16 | — | — | — | — | — |
| 1930–31 | Washington Native Sons | WSRHL | 4 | 2 | 2 | 4 | 2 | — | — | — | — | — |
| 1931–32 | St. Louis Flyers | AHA | 48 | 8 | 5 | 13 | 24 | — | — | — | — | — |
| 1932–33 | New York Americans | NHL | 34 | 10 | 2 | 12 | 6 | — | — | — | — | — |
| 1932–33 | New Haven Eagles | Can-Am | 9 | 2 | 2 | 4 | 6 | — | — | — | — | — |
| 1933–34 | New York Americans | NHL | 47 | 6 | 9 | 15 | 12 | — | — | — | — | — |
| 1934–35 | New York Americans | NHL | 1 | 0 | 0 | 0 | 0 | — | — | — | — | — |
| 1934–35 | Syracuse Stars | IHL | 4 | 0 | 0 | 0 | 0 | — | — | — | — | — |
| 1934–35 | Cleveland Falcons | IHL | 4 | 2 | 0 | 2 | 0 | — | — | — | — | — |
| 1934–35 | Boston Cubs | Can-Am | 29 | 11 | 19 | 30 | 2 | 3 | 1 | 0 | 1 | 0 |
| 1935–36 | Boston Bruins | NHL | 2 | 0 | 0 | 0 | 0 | — | — | — | — | — |
| 1935–36 | Boston Cubs | Can-Am | 12 | 2 | 2 | 4 | 2 | — | — | — | — | — |
| 1935–36 | London Tecumsehs | IHL | 4 | 0 | 3 | 3 | 0 | — | — | — | — | — |
| 1935–36 | New Haven Eagles | Can-Am | 14 | 5 | 2 | 7 | 4 | — | — | — | — | — |
| 1936–37 | New Haven Eagles | IAHL | 1 | 0 | 0 | 0 | 0 | — | — | — | — | — |
| 1936–37 | Minneapolis Millers | AHA | 30 | 8 | 9 | 17 | 8 | 6 | 4 | 1 | 5 | 2 |
| 1937–38 | St. Louis Flyers | AHA | 22 | 2 | 5 | 7 | 14 | — | — | — | — | — |
| NHL totals | | | 84 | 16 | 11 | 27 | 18 | — | — | — | — | — |

== See also ==
- List of National Hockey League players from the United Kingdom
