= 1934–35 Detroit Red Wings season =

Sports season

1934–35 Detroit Red Wings
- Division: 4th American
- 1934–35 record: 19–22–7
- Home record: 11–8–5
- Road record: 8–14–2
- Goals for: 127
- Goals against: 114

Team information
- General manager: Jack Adams
- Coach: Jack Adams
- Captain: Ebbie Goodfellow
- Arena: Detroit Olympia

Team leaders
- Goals: John Sorrell (20)
- Assists: Larry Aurie (29)
- Points: Larry Aurie (46)
- Penalty minutes: Ebbie Goodfellow (44)
- Wins: Normie Smith (12)
- Goals against average: Normie Smith (2.01)

The 1934–35 Detroit Red Wings season was the ninth season for the Detroit NHL franchise, third as the Red Wings. The Red Wings finished fourth in the American Division and did not qualify for the playoffs for the first time since the 1930–31 season.

== Regular season ==
=== Final standings ===
American Division
	GP	W	L	T	GF	GA	PTS
**Boston Bruins**	48	26	16	6	129	112	58
**Chicago Black Hawks**	48	26	17	5	118	88	57
**New York Rangers**	48	22	20	6	137	139	50
Detroit Red Wings	48	19	22	7	127	114	45

Note: GP = Games Played, W = Wins, L = Losses, T = Ties, Pts = Points, GF = Goals For, GA = Goals Against
Teams that qualified for the playoffs are highlighted in bold.

=== Record vs. opponents ===
==== Vs. American Division ====
1934–35 NHL records
Team	**BOS**	**CHI**	**DET**	**NYR**	**Total**
Boston	—	1–4–1	5–0–1	3–1–2	**9–5–4**
Chicago	4–1–1	—	3–3	3–1–2	**10–5–3**
Detroit	0–5–1	3–3	—	2–4	**5–12–1**
N.Y. Rangers	1–3–2	1–3–2	4–2	—	**6–8–4**

==== Vs. Canadian Division ====
1934–35 NHL records
Team	**MTL**	**MTM**	**NYA**	**STL**	**TOR**	**Total**
Boston	4–2	1–4–1	4–2	5–1	3–2–1	**17–11–2**
Chicago	4–1–1	3–3	4–2	4–1–1	1–5	**16–12–2**
Detroit	4–1–1	2–3–1	2–1–3	3–3	3–2–1	**14–10–6**
N.Y. Rangers	2–4	2–3–1	3–2–1	5–1	4–2	**16–12–2**

== Schedule and results ==
1934–35 regular season
November

Game	Result	Date	Score	Opponent	Record
1	L	November 11, 1934	2–4	Boston Bruins (1934–35)	0–1–0
2	W	November 15, 1934	8–2	New York Rangers (1934–35)	1–1–0
3	W	November 17, 1934	3–0	@ Montreal Canadiens (1934–35)	2–1–0
4	L	November 20, 1934	0–1	@ Boston Bruins (1934–35)	2–2–0
5	L	November 22, 1934	3–4 OT	@ New York Rangers (1934–35)	2–3–0
6	L	November 24, 1934	2–3	@ Toronto Maple Leafs (1934–35)	2–4–0
7	W	November 25, 1934	4–1	St. Louis Eagles (1934–35)	3–4–0
8	L	November 29, 1934	1–2	@ Montreal Maroons (1934–35)	3–5–0

December

Game	Result	Date	Score	Opponent	Record
9	W	December 2, 1934	3–0	Toronto Maple Leafs (1934–35)	4–5–0
10	W	December 9, 1934	3–1	St. Louis Eagles (1934–35)	5–5–0
11	L	December 11, 1934	0–4	@ Chicago Black Hawks (1934–35)	5–6–0
12	W	December 13, 1934	11–2	@ St. Louis Eagles (1934–35)	6–6–0
13	T	December 16, 1934	2–2 OT	New York Americans (1934–35)	6–6–1
14	T	December 20, 1934	1–1 OT	Montreal Maroons (1934–35)	6–6–2
15	L	December 22, 1934	3–4	@ Boston Bruins (1934–35)	6–7–2
16	W	December 23, 1934	2–1	@ New York Americans (1934–35)	7–7–2
17	L	December 25, 1934	1–2	Chicago Black Hawks (1934–35)	7–8–2
18	L	December 27, 1934	2–5	@ St. Louis Eagles (1934–35)	7–9–2
19	T	December 30, 1934	0–0 OT	New York Americans (1934–35)	7–9–3

January

Game	Result	Date	Score	Opponent	Record
20	W	January 1, 1935	1–0	@ Toronto Maple Leafs (1934–35)	8–9–3
21	L	January 3, 1935	2–3	@ New York Rangers (1934–35)	8–10–3
22	W	January 6, 1935	6–2	Montreal Canadiens (1934–35)	9–10–3
23	W	January 8, 1935	2–1	@ Chicago Black Hawks (1934–35)	10–10–3
24	L	January 13, 1935	0–2	Toronto Maple Leafs (1934–35)	10–11–3
25	W	January 15, 1935	1–0 OT	@ Montreal Maroons (1934–35)	11–11–3
26	T	January 17, 1935	3–3 OT	@ New York Americans (1934–35)	11–11–4
27	L	January 20, 1935	1–6	St. Louis Eagles (1934–35)	11–12–4
28	T	January 26, 1935	0–0 OT	@ Toronto Maple Leafs (1934–35)	11–12–5
29	T	January 27, 1935	2–2 OT	Boston Bruins (1934–35)	11–12–6
30	T	January 31, 1935	4–4 OT	Montreal Canadiens (1934–35)	11–12–7

February

Game	Result	Date	Score	Opponent	Record
31	L	February 3, 1935	3–5	@ New York Rangers (1934–35)	11–13–7
32	L	February 5, 1935	2–4	@ Boston Bruins (1934–35)	11–14–7
33	L	February 7, 1935	1–4	@ Montreal Canadiens (1934–35)	11–15–7
34	L	February 10, 1935	1–2 OT	Montreal Maroons (1934–35)	11–16–7
35	L	February 14, 1935	0–3	Chicago Black Hawks (1934–35)	11–17–7
36	L	February 16, 1935	3–7	@ Montreal Maroons (1934–35)	11–18–7
37	L	February 17, 1935	3–5 OT	New York Rangers (1934–35)	11–19–7
38	W	February 21, 1935	3–1	Montreal Maroons (1934–35)	12–19–7
39	W	February 24, 1935	4–2	Toronto Maple Leafs (1934–35)	13–19–7
40	L	February 26, 1935	2–3	@ New York Americans (1934–35)	13–20–7
41	W	February 28, 1935	5–1	Chicago Black Hawks (1934–35)	14–20–7

March

Game	Result	Date	Score	Opponent	Record
42	W	March 3, 1935	3–1 OT	New York Americans (1934–35)	15–20–7
43	W	March 7, 1935	6–1	New York Rangers (1934–35)	16–20–7
44	W	March 9, 1935	5–3	@ Montreal Canadiens (1934–35)	17–20–7
45	L	March 10, 1935	1–2 OT	Boston Bruins (1934–35)	17–21–7
46	L	March 12, 1935	2–3	@ St. Louis Eagles (1934–35)	17–22–7
47	W	March 14, 1935	4–3	@ Chicago Black Hawks (1934–35)	18–22–7
48	W	March 17, 1935	6–2	Montreal Canadiens (1934–35)	19–22–7

Legend: Win (2 points) Loss (0 points) Tie (1 point)

== Player statistics ==
=== Regular season ===
Scoring

Player	Pos	GP	G	A	Pts	PIM
Larry Aurie	RW	48	17	29	46	24
Herbie Lewis	LW	47	16	27	43	26
Cooney Weiland	C	48	13	25	38	10
John Sorrell	LW	47	20	16	36	12
Ebbie Goodfellow	C/D	48	12	24	36	44
Eddie Wiseman	RW	39	11	13	24	14
Syd Howe	C/LW	14	8	12	20	11
Doug Young	D	48	4	6	10	37
Tommy Anderson	LW/D	27	5	2	7	16
Lorne Duguid	LW	34	3	3	6	9
Earl Roche	LW	13	3	3	6	0
Irwin Boyd	RW	42	2	3	5	14
Gord Pettinger	C	13	2	3	5	2
Ralph Bowman	D	13	1	3	4	21
Walt Buswell	D	47	1	3	4	32
Des Roche	RW	15	3	0	3	10
Bucko McDonald	D	15	1	2	3	8
Yip Foster	D	12	2	0	2	8
Wilf Starr	C	24	1	1	2	0
Ted Graham	D	24	0	2	2	26
Lloyd Gross	LW	6	1	0	1	2
Oscar Asmundson	C	3	0	0	0	0
Wally Kilrea	RW/C	3	0	0	0	0
Ron Moffat	LW	8	0	0	0	0
George Patterson	W	7	0	0	0	0
John Ross Roach	G	23	0	0	0	0
Normie Smith	G	25	0	0	0	0

Goaltending

Player	MIN	GP	W	L	T	GA	GAA	SO
Normie Smith	1550	25	12	11	2	52	2.01	2
John Ross Roach	1460	23	7	11	5	62	2.55	4
Team:	3010	48	19	22	7	114	2.27	6

Note: Pos = Position; GP = Games played; G = Goals; A = Assists; Pts = Points; PIM = Penalty minutes; PPG = Power-play goals; SHG = Short-handed goals; GWG = Game-winning goals
MIN = Minutes played; W = Wins; L = Losses; T = Ties; GA = Goals-against; GAA = Goals-against average; SO = Shutouts;

== See also ==
- 1934–35 NHL season
