= 1934–35 Boston Bruins season =

NHL team season

1934–35 Boston Bruins
- American Division champions
- Division: 1st American
- 1934–35 record: 26–16–6
- Home record: 17–7–0
- Road record: 9–9–6
- Goals for: 129
- Goals against: 112

Team information
- General manager: Art Ross
- Coach: Frank Patrick
- Captain: Nels Stewart
- Arena: Boston Garden

Team leaders
- Goals: Dit Clapper (22)
- Assists: Eddie Shore (26)
- Points: Marty Barry (40)
- Penalty minutes: Babe Siebert (88)
- Wins: Tiny Thompson (26)
- Goals against average: Tiny Thompson (2.26)

The 1934–35 Boston Bruins season was the Bruins' 11th season in the NHL.

== Regular season ==
=== Final standings ===
American Division
	GP	W	L	T	GF	GA	PTS
**Boston Bruins**	48	26	16	6	129	112	58
**Chicago Black Hawks**	48	26	17	5	118	88	57
**New York Rangers**	48	22	20	6	137	139	50
Detroit Red Wings	48	19	22	7	127	114	45

Note: GP = Games Played, W = Wins, L = Losses, T = Ties, Pts = Points, GF = Goals For, GA = Goals Against
Teams that qualified for the playoffs are highlighted in bold.

=== Record vs. opponents ===
==== Vs. American Division ====
1934–35 NHL records
Team	BOS	CHI	DET	NYR	Total
Boston	—	1–4–1	5–0–1	3–1–2	**9–5–4**
Chicago	4–1–1	—	3–3	3–1–2	**10–5–3**
Detroit	0–5–1	3–3	—	2–4	**5–12–1**
N.Y. Rangers	1–3–2	1–3–2	4–2	—	**6–8–4**

==== Vs. Canadian Division ====
1934–35 NHL records
Team	MTL	MTM	NYA	STL	TOR	Total
Boston	4–2	1–4–1	4–2	5–1	3–2–1	**17–11–2**
Chicago	4–1–1	3–3	4–2	4–1–1	1–5	**16–12–2**
Detroit	4–1–1	2–3–1	2–1–3	3–3	3–2–1	**14–10–6**
N.Y. Rangers	2–4	2–3–1	3–2–1	5–1	4–2	**16–12–2**

== Schedule and results ==
1934–35 regular season
November

Game	Result	Date	Score	Opponent	Record
1	L	November 8, 1934	3–5	@ Toronto Maple Leafs (1934–35)	0–1–0
2	W	November 11, 1934	4–2	@ Detroit Red Wings (1934–35)	1–1–0
3	W	November 17, 1934	1–0	St. Louis Eagles (1934–35)	2–1–0
4	W	November 20, 1934	1–0	Detroit Red Wings (1934–35)	3–1–0
5	W	November 24, 1934	4–1	@ St. Louis Eagles (1934–35)	4–1–0
6	L	November 25, 1934	0–4	@ Chicago Black Hawks (1934–35)	4–2–0
7	L	November 27, 1934	2–3	Chicago Black Hawks (1934–35)	4–3–0

December

Game	Result	Date	Score	Opponent	Record
8	W	December 1, 1934	2–0	@ Montreal Canadiens (1934–35)	5–3–0
9	L	December 4, 1934	0–1	Toronto Maple Leafs (1934–35)	5–4–0
10	W	December 8, 1934	4–0	Montreal Canadiens (1934–35)	6–4–0
11	W	December 11, 1934	4–3	New York Americans (1934–35)	7–4–0
12	L	December 13, 1934	3–4 OT	@ New York Americans (1934–35)	7–5–0
13	L	December 16, 1934	1–2	@ New York Rangers (1934–35)	7–6–0
14	W	December 18, 1934	5–3	New York Rangers (1934–35)	8–6–0
15	W	December 22, 1934	4–3	Detroit Red Wings (1934–35)	9–6–0
16	L	December 25, 1934	3–5	Montreal Maroons (1934–35)	9–7–0
17	L	December 27, 1934	0–1	@ Montreal Maroons (1934–35)	9–8–0
18	T	December 30, 1934	0–0 OT	@ New York Rangers (1934–35)	9–8–1

January

Game	Result	Date	Score	Opponent	Record
19	W	January 1, 1935	5–2	New York Rangers (1934–35)	10–8–1
20	W	January 3, 1935	2–1	@ Montreal Canadiens (1934–35)	11–8–1
21	L	January 5, 1935	0–6	Chicago Black Hawks (1934–35)	11–9–1
22	W	January 8, 1935	3–1	Toronto Maple Leafs (1934–35)	12–9–1
23	W	January 10, 1935	2–1	@ St. Louis Eagles (1934–35)	13–9–1
24	T	January 13, 1935	1–1 OT	@ Chicago Black Hawks (1934–35)	13–9–2
25	W	January 15, 1935	5–3	St. Louis Eagles (1934–35)	14–9–2
26	L	January 19, 1935	1–4	Montreal Canadiens (1934–35)	14–10–2
27	W	January 22, 1935	4–3	Montreal Maroons (1934–35)	15–10–2
28	L	January 26, 1935	2–3	@ Montreal Canadiens (1934–35)	15–11–2
29	T	January 27, 1935	2–2 OT	@ Detroit Red Wings (1934–35)	15–11–3
30	W	January 29, 1935	4–0	New York Americans (1934–35)	16–11–3

February

Game	Result	Date	Score	Opponent	Record
31	L	February 2, 1935	1–3	@ Montreal Maroons (1934–35)	16–12–3
32	W	February 5, 1935	4–2	Detroit Red Wings (1934–35)	17–12–3
33	T	February 7, 1935	4–4 OT	@ Toronto Maple Leafs (1934–35)	17–12–4
34	L	February 10, 1935	5–7	@ New York Americans (1934–35)	17–13–4
35	W	February 12, 1935	6–5 OT	Toronto Maple Leafs (1934–35)	18–13–4
36	L	February 16, 1935	0–3	@ St. Louis Eagles (1934–35)	18–14–4
37	W	February 17, 1935	2–1	@ Chicago Black Hawks (1934–35)	19–14–4
38	W	February 19, 1935	3–1	Montreal Canadiens (1934–35)	20–14–4
39	T	February 24, 1935	0–0 OT	@ New York Rangers (1934–35)	20–14–5
40	W	February 26, 1935	5–0	St. Louis Eagles (1934–35)	21–14–5

March

Game	Result	Date	Score	Opponent	Record
41	T	March 2, 1935	2–2 OT	@ Montreal Maroons (1934–35)	21–14–6
42	W	March 5, 1935	3–1	New York Rangers (1934–35)	22–14–6
43	W	March 9, 1935	7–4	@ Toronto Maple Leafs (1934–35)	23–14–6
44	W	March 10, 1935	2–1 OT	@ Detroit Red Wings (1934–35)	24–14–6
45	W	March 12, 1935	4–1	New York Americans (1934–35)	25–14–6
46	W	March 14, 1935	5–4	@ New York Americans (1934–35)	26–14–6
47	L	March 16, 1935	2–5	Chicago Black Hawks (1934–35)	26–15–6
48	L	March 19, 1935	2–4	Montreal Maroons (1934–35)	26–16–6

Legend: Win (2 points) Loss (0 points) Tie (1 point)

== Playoffs ==
The Boston Bruins lost the semifinals to the Toronto Maple Leafs 3–1.

== Player statistics ==
=== Regular season ===
Scoring

Player	Pos	GP	G	A	Pts	PIM
Marty Barry	C	48	20	20	40	33
Nels Stewart	C	47	21	18	39	45
Dit Clapper	RW/D	48	21	16	37	21
Eddie Shore	D	48	7	26	33	32
Charlie Sands	C/RW	41	15	12	27	0
Max Kaminsky	C	38	12	15	27	4
Red Beattie	LW	48	9	18	27	27
Babe Siebert	LW/D	48	6	18	24	80
Jim O'Neil	C/RW	48	2	11	13	35
Jack Shill	C	45	4	4	8	22
Paul Haynes	C	37	4	3	7	8
Bert McInenly	LW/D	33	2	1	3	24
Hap Emms	LW/D	11	1	1	2	8
Johnny Gagnon	RW	24	1	1	2	9
Jack Portland	D	15	1	1	2	2
Gerry Shannon	LW	17	1	1	2	4
Art Giroux	RW	10	1	0	1	0
Jean Pusie	D	4	1	0	1	0
Bob Davie	D	30	0	1	1	17
Frank Jerwa	LW/D	5	0	0	0	0
Alex Motter	C	3	0	0	0	0
Tony Savage	D	8	0	0	0	2
Tiny Thompson	G	48	0	0	0	0
Burr Williams	D	7	0	0	0	6

Goaltending

Player	MIN	GP	W	L	T	GA	GAA	SO
Tiny Thompson	2970	48	26	16	6	112	2.26	8
Team:	2970	48	26	16	6	112	2.26	8

=== Playoffs ===
Scoring

Player	Pos	GP	G	A	Pts	PIM
Red Beattie	LW	4	1	0	1	2
Dit Clapper	RW/D	3	1	0	1	0
Eddie Shore	D	4	0	1	1	2
Nels Stewart	C	4	0	1	1	0
Marty Barry	C	4	0	0	0	2
Paul Haynes	C	3	0	0	0	0
Max Kaminsky	C	4	0	0	0	0
Bert McInenly	LW/D	4	0	0	0	2
Alex Motter	C	4	0	0	0	0
Jim O'Neil	C/RW	4	0	0	0	9
Jean Pusie	D	4	0	0	0	0
Charlie Sands	C/RW	4	0	0	0	0
Gerry Shannon	LW	4	0	0	0	2
Jack Shill	C	2	0	0	0	0
Babe Siebert	LW/D	4	0	0	0	6
Tiny Thompson	G	4	0	0	0	0

Goaltending

Player	MIN	GP	W	L	GA	GAA	SO
Tiny Thompson	275	4	1	3	7	1.53	1
Team:	275	4	1	3	7	1.53	1

Note:

Pos = Position;GP = Games played; G = Goals; A = Assists; Pts = Points; PIM = Penalty minutes; +/- = Plus/minus; PPG = Power-play goals; SHG = Short-handed goals; GWG = Game-winning goals
Pos = Position;GP = Games played; Min, TOI = Minutes played; W = Wins; L = Losses; T,T/OT = Ties; OTL = Overtime losses; GA = Goals-against; GAA = Goals-against average; SO = Shutouts; SA = Shots against; SV = Shots saved;SV% = Save percentage;

== See also ==
- 1934–35 NHL season
