= Stewart Evans (ice hockey) =

Canadian ice hockey player (1908–1996)

- Born: June 19, 1908 Ottawa, Ontario, Canada
- Died: June 2, 1996 (aged 87)
- Height: 5 ft 10 in (178 cm)
- Weight: 170 lb (77 kg; 12 st 2 lb)
- Position: Defence
- Shot: Left
- Played for: Montreal Canadiens; Montreal Maroons; Detroit Red Wings; Detroit Falcons
- Playing career: 1929–1939

Stewart Hadarezer Evans (June 19, 1908 — June 2, 1996) was a Canadian professional ice hockey player who played 367 games in the National Hockey League between 1930 and 1939.

== Career ==
=== Professional hockey ===
He left amateur hockey in Canada when he was signed as a defensemen for the Detroit Falcons in 1929. The Falcons were renamed in 1932 as the Detroit Red Wings. He played for the Red Wings until the 1933–34 season when he was traded to the Montreal Maroons. He won the Stanley Cup in 1935 with the Maroons. He served as the final captain of the Maroons from 1937 to 1938. He played out the season with the Maroons then moved on for the following season, 1938–39, to the Montreal Canadiens.

=== Post-playing career ===
After retiring from hockey in 1939, Evans moved into the car business, and joined the Ford Motor Company as a labour relations manager. Although he went on to pursue business interests, he never severed ties with the Red Wings.

In 1945 Evans built his first Lincoln-Mercury dealership. He acquired a second dealership in 1955 in Detroit, and by 1957 was the successful owner of a third dealership. At the height of his career in the car industry, his company was among the nation's top 100 in sales and customer satisfaction. In 1993 Evans sold his remaining dealerships to his eldest grandson John, but continued on as chairman of the board until his death in 1996.

In 1960 Evans founded the Red Wings Alumni Association and served as its first president.

== Personal life ==
Evans was born June 19, 1907, in Ottawa, Ontario, to Hadarezer and Jeanne "Jennie" (nee Lapalm) Evans. On August 12, 1930, in Iroquois Falls, Ontario, he married Elizabeth Jane Thompson (1905–1983). They had three children.

Evans's great-grandfather, Thomas Galway McNaughton Evans (1807–1898) was born in Limerick, Ireland. Thomas Galway Evans was the patriarch of the family that left Ireland and made it to North America where he died October 27, 1898, in Nepean, Ontario.

Evans died on June 2, 1996, in Atlantis, Palm Beach County, Florida. He was survived by his wife, children, 11 grandchildren and 9 great-grandchildren.

== Career statistics ==
=== Regular season and playoffs ===
			Regular season					Playoffs
Season	Team	League	GP	G	A	Pts	PIM	GP	G	A	Pts	PIM
1926–27	McIntyre Mines	NOHA	—	—	—	—	—	—	—	—	—	—
1927–28	Iroquois Falls Papermakers	NOHA	—	—	—	—	—	—	—	—	—	—
1928–29	Iroquois Falls Papermakers	NOHA	—	—	—	—	—	—	—	—	—	—
1929–30	Detroit Olympics	IHL	38	8	11	19	113	3	1	0	1	7
1930–31	Detroit Falcons	NHL	38	1	4	5	16	—	—	—	—	—
1931–32	Detroit Olympics	IHL	45	3	9	12	72	6	0	0	0	18
1932–33	Detroit Red Wings	NHL	48	2	6	8	74	4	0	0	0	6
1933–34	Detroit Red Wings	NHL	19	0	0	0	22	—	—	—	—	—
1933–34	Montreal Maroons	NHL	29	4	2	6	33	4	0	0	0	4
1934–35	Montreal Maroons	NHL	46	5	7	12	54	7	0	0	0	8
1935–36	Montreal Maroons	NHL	48	3	5	8	57	3	0	0	0	0
1936–37	Montreal Maroons	NHL	48	6	7	13	54	5	0	0	0	0
1937–38	Montreal Maroons	NHL	48	5	11	16	59	—	—	—	—	—
1938–39	Montreal Canadiens	NHL	43	2	7	9	58	—	—	—	—	—
NHL totals			367	28	49	77	427	26	0	0	0	20

Preceded by Lionel Conacher	Montreal Maroons captain 1937–38	Succeeded by Position abolished
