= Nels Crutchfield =

Canadian ice hockey player

- Crutchfield with the Montreal Canadiens, c. 1934–35
- Born: July 12, 1911; Knowlton, Quebec, Canada
- Died: July 22, 1985 (aged 74); Huntsville, Ontario, Canada
- Height: 6 ft 1 in (185 cm)
- Weight: 175 lb (79 kg; 12 st 7 lb)
- Position: Centre
- Shot: Left
- Played for: Montreal Canadiens
- Playing career: 1928–1935

William Ian Nelson Crutchfield (July 12, 1911 — July 22, 1985), known as Nels Crutchfield, was a Canadian professional ice hockey player.

Born in Knowlton, Quebec, he played defence and centre for the McGill Redmen from 1930 to 1934 and was team captain from 1933 to 1934. He received a Bachelor of Commerce degree in 1934. He played 41 games in the 1934–35 season with the Montreal Canadiens, recording 5 goals and 5 assists, with another assist in two playoff games that year. His career was cut short after receiving a fractured skull in a car accident in September 1935.

He died in another car accident in 1985 in Huntsville, Ontario.

Crutchfield was inducted into the McGill University Sports Hall of Fame in 2001.

== Career statistics ==
=== Regular season and playoffs ===
			Regular season					Playoffs
Season	Team	League	GP	G	A	Pts	PIM	GP	G	A	Pts	PIM
1928–29	Shawinigan Cataractes	ECHA	24	8	1	9	39	—	—	—	—	—
1929–30	Shawinigan Cataractes	ECHA	24	5	4	9	38	—	—	—	—	—
1930–31	Shawinigan Cataractes	ECHA	12	6	4	10	6	—	—	—	—	—
1930–31	McGill University	MCHL	12	2	2	4	21	4	2	0	2	8
1930–31	McGill University	Al-Cup	—	—	—	—	—	6	2	0	2	14
1931–32	McGill University	MCHL	12	7	6	13	41	2	1	0	1	11
1932–33	McGill University	MCHL	10	7	4	11	33	7	1	1	2	28
1933–34	McGill University	MCHL	12	3	8	11	34	2	1	0	1	6
1933–34	McGill University	Al-Cup	—	—	—	—	—	4	3	1	4	12
1934–35	Montreal Canadiens	NHL	41	5	5	10	20	2	0	1	1	22
NHL totals			41	5	5	10	20	2	0	1	1	22
