= Jack McGill (ice hockey, born 1909) =

Canadian ice hockey player

- Born: November 3, 1909; Ottawa, Ontario, Canada
- Died: August 21, 1988 (aged 78)
- Height: 5 ft 10 in (178 cm)
- Weight: 150 lb (68 kg; 10 st 10 lb)
- Position: Left wing
- Shot: Left
- Played for: Montreal Canadiens
- Playing career: 1927–1937

John James McGill, Sr. (November 3, 1909 – August 21, 1988) was a Canadian professional ice hockey player who played 134 games in the National Hockey League with the Montreal Canadiens between 1934 and 1937. Before turning professional, he spent several years in the Ottawa City Hockey League and Montreal City Hockey League. He was born in Ottawa, Ontario in 1909. He died in 1988 and was buried at Hutcheson Memorial Cemetery in Huntsville, Ontario.

== Career statistics ==
=== Regular season and playoffs ===
			Regular season					Playoffs
Season	Team	League	GP	G	A	Pts	PIM	GP	G	A	Pts	PIM
1928–29	Ottawa New Edinburghs	OCHL	15	3	0	3	—	2	0	0	0	0
1929–30	Ottawa New Edinburghs	OCHL	19	3	3	6	12	2	0	0	0	0
1930–31	McGill University	MCHL	12	6	0	6	29	4	6	0	6	18
1930–31	McGill University	Al-Cup	—	—	—	—	—	6	0	2	2	18
1931–32	McGill University	MCHL	12	5	2	7	36	2	0	0	0	0
1932–33	McGill University	MCHL	12	12	6	18	45	3	0	2	2	8
1933–34	McGill University	MCHL	12	9	8	7	24	4	2	4	6	6
1933–34	McGill University	Al-Cup	—	—	—	—	—	4	3	1	4	8
1934–35	Montreal Canadiens	NHL	44	9	1	10	34	2	2	0	2	0
1935–36	Montreal Canadiens	NHL	46	13	7	20	28	—	—	—	—	—
1936–37	Montreal Canadiens	NHL	44	5	2	7	9	1	0	0	0	0
NHL totals			134	27	10	37	71	3	2	0	2	0
