= Bert Connelly =

Canadian ice hockey player

- Bert Connelly with the New York Rangers
- Born: April 22, 1909 Montreal, Quebec, Canada
- Died: July 2, 1990 (aged 81) Montreal, Quebec, Canada
- Height: 5 ft 11 in (180 cm)
- Weight: 175 lb (79 kg; 12 st 7 lb)
- Position: Left wing
- Shot: Left
- Played for: New York Rangers; Chicago Black Hawks
- Playing career: 1928–1946

Albert Patrick Connelly (April 22, 1909 – July 2, 1990) was a Canadian left winger who played 87 games in the National Hockey League with the New York Rangers and the Chicago Black Hawks between 1934 and 1938. He won the Stanley Cup with Chicago in 1938. The rest of his career, which lasted from 1928 to 1946, was spent in various minor leagues. He was born in Montreal, Quebec.

== Playing career ==
Although his NHL career was brief, lasting from 1934 to 1938, he had a long career both before and after. From 1929 to 1931 he played for 3 teams in the Montreal City Hockey League: the Montreal Eurekas, the Montreal CNR, and the Montreal Columbus. He later played for the Verdun CPR, and the Moncton Hawks. The Hawks won the Allan Cup two times during his time with the team.

In 1934 he finally got his chance in the NHL when he was signed by the New York Rangers. He played with the Rangers for 2 seasons. He played the 1937 season with the Philadelphia Ramblers of the International American Hockey League. He began the next season with the Springfield Indians. Midway through the 1938 season, he was picked up by the Chicago Black Hawks. He helped the team win the Stanley Cup for that year.

After his Stanley Cup triumph with the Black Hawks his NHL career was over. He remained an active player in the minor leagues until 1946 when he retired from hockey. He died in 1990 in Montreal, Quebec.

== Career statistics ==
=== Regular season and playoffs ===
			Regular season					Playoffs
Season	Team	League	GP	G	A	Pts	PIM	GP	G	A	Pts	PIM
1928–29	Montreal Eurekas	MCHL	—	10	0	10	—	—	—	—	—	—
1928–29	Montreal CNR	MRTAHL	12	8	0	8	8	2	0	0	0	2
1929–30	Montreal Columbus Club	MCHL	10	0	0	0	11	—	—	—	—	—
1929–30	Montreal CNR	MRTAHL	8	3	2	5	11	2	0	0	0	2
1930–31	Verdun CPR	MMRHL	—	—	—	—	—	—	—	—	—	—
1930–31	Montreal CNR	MRTAHL	9	3	0	3	11	2	1	0	1	—
1931–32	Moncton Hawks	NBSHL	24	10	4	14	44	5	0	0	0	4
1932–33	Moncton Hawks	MSHL	26	6	3	9	37	5	2	0	2	8
1932–33	Moncton Hawks	Al-Cup	—	—	—	—	—	8	5	0	5	6
1933–34	Moncton Hawks	NBSHL	29	14	11	25	31	3	5	2	7	2
1933–34	Moncton Hawks	Al-Cup	—	—	—	—	—	11	5	3	8	10
1934–35	New York Rangers	NHL	47	10	11	21	23	4	1	0	1	0
1935–36	New York Rangers	NHL	25	2	2	4	10	—	—	—	—	—
1936–37	Philadelphia Ramblers	IAHL	45	9	12	21	35	3	0	0	0	0
1937–38	Chicago Black Hawks	NHL	15	1	2	3	4	10	0	0	0	0
1937–38	Springfield Indians	IAHL	29	5	9	14	31	—	—	—	—	—
1938–39	Springfield Indians	IAHL	45	15	12	27	30	3	0	0	0	0
1939–40	St. Paul Saints	AHA	46	24	25	49	53	7	4	2	6	21
1940–41	St. Paul Saints	AHA	46	16	11	27	31	4	0	0	0	0
1941–42	Fort Worth Rangers	AHA	49	27	32	59	36	5	3	0	3	6
1942–43	Montreal Royals	QSHL	14	3	5	8	2	—	—	—	—	—
1943–44	Montreal Canada Car	MCHL	11	12	10	22	4	—	—	—	—	—
1944–45	Valleyfield Braves	QPHL	35	23	23	46	26	11	7	4	11	6
1944–45	Valleyfield Braves	Al-Cup	—	—	—	—	—	3	2	0	2	2
1945–46	St-Hyacinthe Saints	QPHL	17	13	10	23	33	4	1	2	3	2
AHA totals			141	67	68	135	120	16	7	2	9	27
NHL totals			87	13	15	28	37	14	1	0	1	0
