= Roger Jenkins (ice hockey) =

American ice hockey player (1911–1994)

- Born: November 18, 1911 Appleton, Wisconsin, U.S.
- Died: May 4, 1994 (aged 82)
- Height: 5 ft 8 in (173 cm)
- Weight: 180 lb (82 kg; 12 st 12 lb)
- Position: Defence
- Shot: Right
- Played for: Toronto Maple Leafs; Chicago Blackhawks; Montreal Canadiens; Boston Bruins; Montreal Maroons; New York Americans
- Playing career: 1930–1939

Joseph Roger "Broadway" Jenkins (November 18, 1911 – May 4, 1994) was an American-born Canadian ice hockey player who played 327 games in the National Hockey League. He played for the Toronto Maple Leafs, New York Americans, Montreal Canadiens, Montreal Maroons, Boston Bruins, and Chicago Black Hawks. A native of Appleton, Wisconsin, Jenkins moved to Port Arthur, Ontario where he learned to play hockey. He won the Stanley Cup with Chicago in 1934 and 1938. During the 'Hawks Stanley Cup victory parade in 1934, he carted goaltender Charlie Gardiner around the Chicago Loop in a wheelbarrow, fulfilling a pre-playoff bet he made with the Hall of Fame goaltender.

== Career statistics ==
=== Regular season and playoffs ===
			Regular season					Playoffs
Season	Team	League	GP	G	A	Pts	PIM	GP	G	A	Pts	PIM
1929–30	Edmonton Imperials	EJrHL	13	8	3	11	14	—	—	—	—	—
1930–31	Toronto Maple Leafs	NHL	21	0	0	0	12	—	—	—	—	—
1930–31	Chicago Black Hawks	NHL	10	0	1	1	2	—	—	—	—	—
1931–32	Bronx Tigers	Can-Am	40	9	7	16	65	2	0	0	0	4
1932–33	Chicago Black Hawks	NHL	46	3	10	13	42	—	—	—	—	—
1933–34	Chicago Black Hawks	NHL	48	2	2	4	37	8	0	0	0	4
1934–35	Montreal Canadiens	NHL	45	4	6	10	63	2	1	0	1	2
1935–36	Boston Bruins	NHL	42	2	6	8	51	2	0	1	1	2
1935–36	Boston Cubs	CAHL	5	2	2	4	9	—	—	—	—	—
1936–37	Montreal Canadiens	NHL	10	0	0	0	8	—	—	—	—	—
1936–37	Montreal Maroons	NHL	1	0	0	0	0	—	—	—	—	—
1936–37	New York Americans	NHL	26	1	4	5	6	—	—	—	—	—
1937–38	Chicago Black Hawks	NHL	37	1	8	9	26	10	0	6	6	8
1938–39	Chicago Black Hawks	NHL	14	1	1	2	2	—	—	—	—	—
1938–39	New York Americans	NHL	27	1	1	2	4	2	0	0	0	0
1939–40	Springfield Indians	IAHL	50	8	18	26	20	2	0	0	0	0
1940–41	Hershey Bears	AHL	56	5	19	24	81	10	3	1	4	12
1941–42	Hershey Bears	AHL	55	9	28	37	90	10	3	5	8	10
1942–43	Hershey Bears	AHL	56	10	33	43	90	6	0	1	1	2
1942–43	Washington Lions	AHL	1	0	0	0	0	—	—	—	—	—
1943–44	Seattle Ironmen	PCHL	16	16	19	35	45	2	1	3	4	2
1943–44	Portland Oilers	PCHL	—	—	—	—	—	4	2	3	5	12
1944–45	Seattle Stars	PCHL	—	—	—	—	—	—	—	—	—	—
1945–46	Seattle Ironmen	PCHL	55	12	20	32	69	—	—	—	—	—
1946–47	Tacoma Rockets	PCHL	55	9	22	31	40	—	—	—	—	—
1947–48	Tacoma Rockets	PCHL	58	6	24	30	101	—	—	—	—	—
NHL totals			327	15	39	54	253	24	1	7	8	16

== Transactions ==
- Signed as a free agent by the Chicago Black Hawks, October 28, 1930.
- Loaned to the Toronto Maple Leafs by the Chicago Black Hawks, December 4, 1930.
- Returned to the Chicago Black Hawks by the Toronto Maple Leafs, February 3, 1931.
- Traded by the Chicago Black Hawks with Leroy Goldsworthy and Lionel Conacher to the Montreal Canadiens for Lorne Chabot, Howie Morenz and Marty Burke, October 3, 1934.
- Traded by the Montreal Canadiens to the Boston Bruins for Jean Pusie, Walt Buswell and cash, July 13, 1935.
- Traded by the Boston Bruins with Babe Siebert to the Montreal Canadiens for Leroy Goldsworthy, Sammy McManus and $10,000, September 10, 1936.
- Signed as a free agent by the Montreal Maroons, December 17, 1936.
- Loaned to the New York Americans by the Montreal Maroons, January 1, 1937.
- Signed as a free agent by the Chicago Black Hawks, November 20, 1937.
- Signed as a free agent by the New York Americans, January 1, 1939.
- Traded by the New York Americans to the Springfield Indians of the IAHL for cash, October 2, 1939.
