= Charley McVeigh =

Canadian ice hockey player

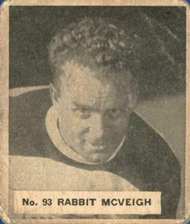
- McVeigh c. 1937
- Born: March 29, 1898 Kenora, Ontario, Canada
- Died: May 7, 1984 (aged 86)
- Height: 5 ft 6 in (168 cm)
- Weight: 145 lb (66 kg; 10 st 5 lb)
- Position: Centre
- Shot: Left
- Played for: New York Americans; Chicago Black Hawks; Portland Rosebuds; Regina Capitals
- Playing career: 1921–1936

Charles Henry "Rabbit" McVeigh (March 29, 1898 — May 7, 1984) was a Canadian professional ice hockey player who played 397 games in the National Hockey League with the Chicago Black Hawks and New York Americans between 1926 and 1935. He also was a veteran in Canada who fought in the First World War.

His nickname "Rabbit" came from his speed combined with his ability to jump the sticks of opponent players.

He was the last surviving former player of the Portland Rosebuds.

== Hearing loss ==
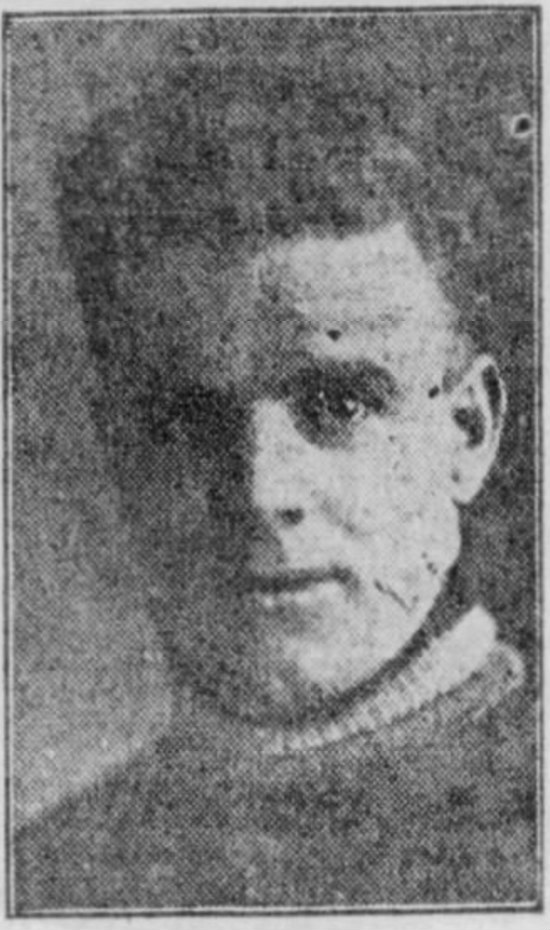
1920s image of McVeigh

McVeigh's service with the 16th Canadian Infantry in the First World War damaged his hearing, and while he was not legally deaf he had problems hearing everyday speech unless the speaker raised the voice well above its normal pitch and spoke into his less damaged ear. He was also injured in his knees and in the chest, while with the overseas forces.

== Career statistics ==
=== Regular season and playoffs ===
			Regular season					Playoffs
Season	Team	League	GP	G	A	Pts	PIM	GP	G	A	Pts	PIM
1918–19	Winnipeg GTP	WJrHL	—	—	—	—	—	—	—	—	—	—
1919–20	Winnipeg Victorias	WSrHL	7	3	12	15	12	—	—	—	—	—
1920–21	Moose Jaw Maple Leafs	SSHL	15	9	5	14	19	4	0	2	2	2
1921–22	Regina Capitals	WCHL	19	15	6	21	8	4	1	0	1	0
1921–22	Regina Capitals	West-P	—	—	—	—	—	1	0	0	0	0
1922–23	Regina Capitals	WCHL	30	10	2	12	20	2	0	0	0	0
1923–24	Regina Capitals	WCHL	26	10	0	10	6	2	0	0	0	0
1924–25	Regina Capitals	WCHL	28	9	5	14	8	—	—	—	—	—
1925–26	Portland Rosebuds	WHL	27	8	3	11	14	—	—	—	—	—
1926–27	Chicago Black Hawks	NHL	43	12	4	16	23	2	0	0	0	0
1927–28	Chicago Black Hawks	NHL	43	6	7	13	10	—	—	—	—	—
1928–29	New York Americans	NHL	44	6	2	8	16	2	0	0	0	2
1929–30	New York Americans	NHL	40	14	14	28	32	—	—	—	—	—
1930–31	New York Americans	NHL	44	5	11	16	23	—	—	—	—	—
1931–32	New York Americans	NHL	48	12	15	27	16	—	—	—	—	—
1932–33	New York Americans	NHL	40	7	12	19	10	—	—	—	—	—
1933–34	New York Americans	NHL	48	15	12	27	4	—	—	—	—	—
1934–35	New York Americans	NHL	47	7	11	18	4	—	—	—	—	—
1935–36	London Tecumsehs	IHL	47	12	11	23	6	2	0	0	0	0
WCHL/WHL totals			130	52	16	68	56	8	1	0	1	0
NHL totals			397	84	88	172	138	4	0	0	0	2
