= Bill Thoms =

Canadian ice hockey player

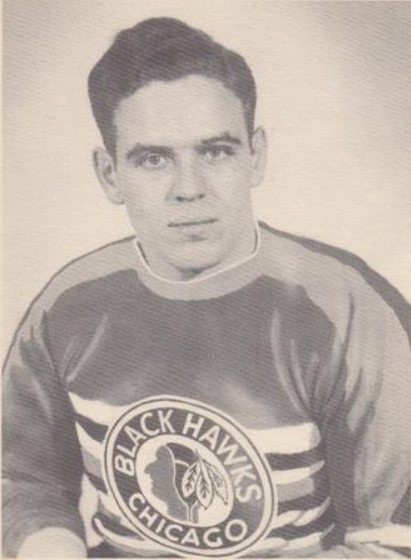
- Thoms in 1939
- Born: March 5, 1910 Newmarket, Ontario, Canada
- Died: December 26, 1964 (aged 54) Toronto, Ontario, Canada
- Height: 5 ft 10 in (178 cm)
- Weight: 168 lb (76 kg; 12 st 0 lb)
- Position: Centre
- Shot: Left
- Played for: Toronto Maple Leafs; Boston Bruins; Chicago Black Hawks
- Playing career: 1932–1945

William David Thoms (March 5, 1910 – December 26, 1964) was a Canadian professional ice hockey player who played 548 games in the National Hockey League for the Toronto Maple Leafs, Chicago Black Hawks and Boston Bruins between 1932 and 1945.

Thoms tied Charlie Conacher for the NHL goal-scoring lead in 1935–36; however, Conacher is recognized as the goal-scoring champion due to Conacher's playing fewer games. After his retirement in 1945, Thoms briefly coached the Toronto Marlboros of the Ontario Hockey Association, and died of a heart attack on December 26, 1964.

== Career statistics ==
=== Regular season and playoffs ===
			Regular season					Playoffs
Season	Team	League	GP	G	A	Pts	PIM	GP	G	A	Pts	PIM
1928–29	Newmarket Redmen	OHA	—	—	—	—	—	—	—	—	—	—
1929–30	West Toronto Nationals	OHA	7	7	13	20	6	2	0	0	0	0
1929–30	West Toronto Nationals	M-Cup	—	—	—	—	—	9	9	5	14	10
1930–31	Toronto Marlboros	OHA	11	11	2	13	4	3	0	0	0	2
1930–31	Toronto Eaton's	TMHL	15	11	7	18	0	6	0	4	4	0
1931–32	Toronto Marlboros	OHA	20	16	6	22	26	2	1	0	1	0
1931–32	Syracuse Stars	IHL	12	2	4	6	2	—	—	—	—	—
1931–32	Toronto Eaton's	TMHL	6	4	4	8	0	2	4	1	5	0
1932–33	Toronto Marlboros	OHA Sr	1	0	0	0	0	—	—	—	—	—
1932–33	Toronto Maple Leafs	NHL	29	3	9	12	15	9	1	1	2	4
1933–34	Toronto Maple Leafs	NHL	47	8	18	26	24	5	0	2	2	0
1934–35	Toronto Maple Leafs	NHL	47	9	13	22	15	7	2	0	2	0
1935–36	Toronto Maple Leafs	NHL	48	23	15	38	29	9	3	5	8	0
1936–37	Toronto Maple Leafs	NHL	48	10	9	19	14	2	0	0	0	0
1937–38	Toronto Maple Leafs	NHL	48	14	24	38	14	7	0	1	1	0
1938–39	Toronto Maple Leafs	NHL	12	1	4	5	4	—	—	—	—	—
1938–39	Chicago Black Hawks	NHL	36	6	11	17	16	—	—	—	—	—
1939–40	Chicago Black Hawks	NHL	47	9	13	22	2	1	0	0	0	0
1940–41	Chicago Black Hawks	NHL	47	13	19	32	4	—	—	—	—	—
1941–42	Chicago Black Hawks	NHL	47	15	30	45	4	3	0	1	1	0
1942–43	Chicago Black Hawks	NHL	47	15	28	43	3	—	—	—	—	—
1943–44	Chicago Black Hawks	NHL	7	3	5	8	2	—	—	—	—	—
1944–45	Chicago Black Hawks	NHL	21	2	6	8	8	—	—	—	—	—
1944–45	Boston Bruins	NHL	17	4	2	6	0	1	0	0	0	2
1947–48	Toronto Maher Jewels	TIHL	26	4	16	20	10	3	2	0	2	7
NHL totals			548	135	206	341	154	44	6	10	16	6
