= 1930 Allan Cup =

Canadian senior ice hockey championship

The Allan Cup trophy

The 1930 Allan Cup was the Canadian senior ice hockey championship for the 1929–30 season.

== Final ==
The series was held at Arena Gardens in Toronto.

Best of 3

- Montreal 6 Port Arthur 0
- Montreal 2 Port Arthur 1

Montreal AAA beat Port Arthur 2-0 on series.
