= 1934–35 NHL season =

Professional ice hockey league season

- League: National Hockey League
- Sport: Ice hockey
- Duration: November 8, 1934 – April 9, 1935
- Games: 48
- Teams: 9

Regular season
- Season champions: Toronto Maple Leafs
- Season MVP: Eddie Shore (Bruins)
- Top scorer: Charlie Conacher (Maple Leafs)
- Canadian Division champions: Toronto Maple Leafs
- American Division champions: Boston Bruins

Stanley Cup
- Champions: Montreal Maroons
- Runners-up: Toronto Maple Leafs

NHL seasons
- ← 1933–34 1935–36 →

The 1934–35 NHL season was the 18th season of the National Hockey League (NHL). Nine teams each played 48 games. The Ottawa Senators moved to St. Louis and became the St. Louis Eagles. The Montreal Maroons were the Stanley Cup winners as they swept the Toronto Maple Leafs in three games in the Stanley Cup Finals.

== League business ==
In the midst of the Great Depression financial difficulties continued for the Ottawa Senators. The franchise transferred to St. Louis, changing the nickname to the Eagles. The Ottawa organization continued the Senators as a senior amateur team. Despite the new locale the franchise was not profitable in St. Louis either, due in part high travel expenses resulting from still being in the Canadian Division. The Eagles would sell players Syd Howe and Ralph "Scotty" Bowman to Detroit for $50,000 to make ends meet.

Montreal Canadiens owners Leo Dandurand and Joseph Cattarinich sell the team to Ernest Savard and Maurice Forget of the Canadian Arena Company.

The penalty shot, an invention of the old Pacific Coast Hockey Association (PCHA), was introduced in the NHL this season. The puck was placed in a 10-foot circle, 38 feet (12 m) from the goalmouth. The player could shoot while stationary within the circle, or could shoot while moving, as long as the shot was taken within the circle. The goaltender had to be stationary until the puck was shot, and no more than 1 foot (0.30 m) in front of the goal mouth.

Several more teams changed from a single uniform to a light version and dark version. The Detroit Red Wings introduced a white version of their existing uniform, swapping red elements for white elements. The Chicago Black Hawks introduced a new uniform design, and differentiated between versions by using white in the main horizontal stripe and their socks, and using brown in the other version. The New York Americans and Toronto Maple Leafs continued using their two sets of uniforms. The Boston Bruins, Montreal Canadiens, Montreal Maroons, New York Rangers and St. Louis Eagles used only a single uniform design each.

== Arena changes ==
- The Boston Bruins' home arena, Boston Madison Square Garden, became simply known as Boston Garden after the Madison Square Garden Corporation sold its ownership stake in the building to the Boston Arena Corporation.
- The relocated St. Louis Eagles moved from the Ottawa Auditorium to St. Louis Arena.

== Regular season ==
Charlie Conacher decided to play coy this year and Conn Smythe had trouble signing him. With Harvey Jackson out, it looked as though Joe Primeau would be the only member of the Kid line in action for Toronto. However, he did finally sign. Conacher responded with his best season, scoring 36 goals and leading the league in scoring.

A bombshell trade was made with Howie Morenz, Lorne Chabot and Marty Burke going to Chicago for Leroy Goldsworthy, Roger Jenkins, and Lionel Conacher. Although Morenz was not his old self, he did help Chicago, who finished second in the American Division, just falling short of Boston by only one point. The Canadiens then traded Lionel Conacher and Herb Cain to the Maroons for Nels Crutchfield. The trades did not help and the Canadiens lost some fans.

Meanwhile, Tommy Gorman bought a share of the Montreal Maroons from James Strachan and when he picked up Alex Connell, he had another winner.

The first penalty shot was awarded to the Montreal Canadiens' Armand Mondou on November 10, 1934; he was stopped by the Toronto Maple Leafs' George Hainsworth. On November 13, Ralph "Scotty" Bowman of the St. Louis Eagles scored the first penalty shot goal in NHL history.

The playoffs continued to elude the New York Americans, but they added two important additions, left wing Dave "Sweeney" Schriner and right wing Lorne Carr. Teamed with centre Art Chapman, the Americans were on the way up.

=== Final standings ===
American Division
	GP	W	L	T	GF	GA	PTS
**Boston Bruins**	48	26	16	6	129	112	58
**Chicago Black Hawks**	48	26	17	5	118	88	57
**New York Rangers**	48	22	20	6	137	139	50
Detroit Red Wings	48	19	22	7	127	114	45

Canadian Division
	GP	W	L	T	GF	GA	PTS
**Toronto Maple Leafs**	48	30	14	4	157	111	64
**Montreal Maroons**	48	24	19	5	123	92	53
**Montreal Canadiens**	48	19	23	6	110	145	44
New York Americans	48	12	27	9	100	142	33
St. Louis Eagles	48	11	31	6	86	144	28

Note: W = Wins, L = Losses, T = Ties, GF = Goals For, GA = Goals Against, Pts = Points
Teams that qualified for the playoffs are highlighted in bold.

== Playoffs ==
=== Playoff bracket ===
The top three teams in each division qualified for the playoffs. The two division winners met in a best-of-five Stanley Cup semifinal series. The divisional second-place teams and third-place teams played off in a two-game total-goals series to determine the participants for the other two-game total-goals semifinal series. The semifinal winners then played in a best-of-five Stanley Cup Finals.

First round
C2	Mtl Maroons	1G
A2	Chicago	0G
C3	Mtl Canadiens	5G
A3	NY Rangers	6G

Semifinals
C1	Toronto	3
A1	Boston	1
C2	Mtl Maroons	5G
A3	NY Rangers	4G

Final
C1	Toronto	0
C2	Mtl Maroons	3

=== Quarterfinals ===
==== (A2) Chicago Black Hawks vs. (C2) Montreal Maroons ====
Chicago coach Clem Loughlin said that the team who won the series very likely would win the Stanley Cup. Neither team scored after two regulation games. In the overtime, Maroons forward Dave Trottier was cut and retired for stitches. He had hardly arrived in the dressing room when Baldy Northcott scored the goal that won the series for the Maroons.

March 23	Chicago Black Hawks	0–0	Montreal Maroons	Montreal Forum	Recap
No scoring		First period	No scoring
No scoring		Second period	No scoring
No scoring		Third period	No scoring
Lorne Chabot		Goalie stats	Alex Connell

March 26	Montreal Maroons	1–0	OT	Chicago Black Hawks	Chicago Stadium	Recap
No scoring		First period		No scoring
No scoring		Second period		No scoring
No scoring		Third period		No scoring
Baldy Northcott (1) – pp – 04:02		First overtime period		No scoring
Alex Connell		Goalie stats		Lorne Chabot

Montreal won series on total goals 1–0

==== (A3) New York Rangers vs. (C3) Montreal Canadiens ====
March 24	Montreal Canadiens	1–2	New York Rangers	Madison Square Garden III	Recap
No scoring		First period	08:00 – Cecil Dillon (1)
Roger Jenkins (1) – 13:54		Second period	No scoring
No scoring		Third period	12:42 – pp – Bill Cook (1)
Wilf Cude		Goalie stats	Dave Kerr

March 26	New York Rangers	4–4	Montreal Canadiens	Montreal Forum	Recap
Lynn Patrick (1) – 16:34		First period	No scoring
Butch Keeling (1) – 08:23; Cecil Dillon (2) – 13:11		Second period	10:52 – pp – Leroy Goldsworthy (1)
Butch Keeling (2) – 05:14		Third period	04:39 – Jack McGill (1); 09:52 – pp – Jack McGill (2); 10:17 – Aurele Joliat (1)
Dave Kerr		Goalie stats	Wilf Cude

New York won series on total goals 6–5

=== Semifinals ===
Toronto's goaltender George Hainsworth got hot and eliminated the Bruins, while the Rangers outlasted the Montreal Canadiens on Bill Cook's goal in the deciding game. He had been knocked goofy by the Canadiens Nels Crutchfield, but was not too groggy to win the series for the Rangers.

==== (C1) Toronto Maple Leafs vs. (A1) Boston Bruins ====
March 23	Toronto Maple Leafs	0–1	2OT	Boston Bruins	Boston Garden	Recap
No scoring		First period		No scoring
No scoring		Second period		No scoring
No scoring		Third period		No scoring
No scoring		Second overtime period		13:26 – Dit Clapper (1)
George Hainsworth		Goalie stats		Tiny Thompson

March 26	Toronto Maple Leafs	2–0	Boston Bruins	Boston Garden	Recap
No scoring		First period	No scoring
No scoring		Second period	No scoring
Charlie Conacher (1) – pp – 09:50; Busher Jackson (1) – 12:03		Third period	No scoring
George Hainsworth		Goalie stats	Tiny Thompson

March 28	Boston Bruins	0–3	Toronto Maple Leafs	Maple Leaf Gardens	Recap
No scoring		First period	00:43 – Bill Thoms (1)
No scoring		Second period	11:03 – Nick Metz (1)
No scoring		Third period	12:27 – Busher Jackson (2)
Tiny Thompson		Goalie stats	George Hainsworth

March 30	Boston Bruins	1–2	OT	Toronto Maple Leafs	Maple Leaf Gardens	Recap
Red Beattie (1) – pp – 15:45		First period		No scoring
No scoring		Second period		No scoring
No scoring		Third period		18:11 – pp – Pep Kelly (1)
No scoring		First overtime period		01:36 – Pep Kelly (2)
Tiny Thompson		Goalie stats		George Hainsworth

Toronto won series 3–1

==== (C2) Montreal Maroons vs. (A3) New York Rangers ====
March 28	Montreal Maroons	2–1	New York Rangers	Madison Square Garden III	Recap
Herb Cain (1) – 10:18		First period	03:10 – Bun Cook (1)
Baldy Northcott (2) – 14:43		Second period	No scoring
No scoring		Third period	No scoring
Alex Connell		Goalie stats	Dave Kerr

March 30	New York Rangers	3–3	Montreal Maroons	Montreal Forum	Recap
Bun Cook (2) – 13:46		First period	13:03 – Cy Wentworth (1); 19:33 – Russ Blinco (1)
Lynn Patrick (2) – pp – 09:06		Second period	No scoring
Bert Connelly (1) – 08:30		Third period	02:41 – Dave Trottier (1)
Dave Kerr		Goalie stats	Alex Connell

Montreal won series on total goals 5–4

=== Stanley Cup Finals ===
The Montreal Maroons throttled the Kid line of Joe Primeau, Harvey Jackson and Charlie Conacher and goaltender Alex Connell time and again foiled sure goals for Toronto, and the Maroons won the series three games to none, and as game three ended, the crowd let out a roar of approval and Connell leaned back on the crossbar and cried. All of the Maroons' games ended in ties or victories, making them the last team until the 1951–52 Detroit Red Wings to not lose a single game during the playoffs. The Maroons were also the last non-Original Six team to win the Stanley Cup until the Philadelphia Flyers won it in 1974 and the last team that is currently defunct to have won a Stanley Cup.

April 4	Montreal Maroons	3–2	OT	Toronto Maple Leafs	Maple Leaf Gardens	Recap
No scoring		First period		No scoring
Earl Robinson (1) – 03:57; Cy Wentworth (2) – 19:12		Second period		14:28 – Frank Finnigan (1); 18:12 – King Clancy (1)
No scoring		Third period		No scoring
Dave Trottier (2) – 05:28		First overtime period		No scoring
Alex Connell		Goalie stats		George Hainsworth

April 6	Montreal Maroons	3–1	Toronto Maple Leafs	Maple Leaf Gardens	Recap
Earl Robinson (2) – pp – 15:44		First period	No scoring
Russ Blinco (2) – 16:47		Second period	07:31 – sh – Busher Jackson (3)
Baldy Northcott (3) – 03:27		Third period	No scoring
Alex Connell		Goalie stats	George Hainsworth

April 9	Toronto Maple Leafs	1–4	Montreal Maroons	Montreal Forum	Recap
No scoring		First period	19:35 – sh – Jimmy Ward (1)
Bill Thoms (2) – 12:59		Second period	16:18 – Baldy Northcott (4); 16:30 – Cy Wentworth (3)
No scoring		Third period	01:02 – Gus Marker (1)
George Hainsworth		Goalie stats	Alex Connell

Montreal won series 3–0

== Awards ==
Eddie Shore won the Hart Trophy for the second time in his career. Frank Boucher won the Lady Byng for the seventh and final time in his career, and his third consecutive time. Lorne Chabot won the Vezina for the first and only time in his career.

Hart Trophy: (Most valuable player)	Eddie Shore, Boston Bruins
Lady Byng Trophy: (Excellence and sportsmanship)	Frank Boucher, New York Rangers
O'Brien Cup: (Canadian Division champion)	Toronto Maple Leafs
Prince of Wales Trophy: (American Division champion)	Boston Bruins
Rookie of the Year: (Best first-year player)	Sweeney Schriner, New York Americans
Vezina Trophy: (Fewest goals allowed)	Lorne Chabot, Chicago Black Hawks

=== All-Star teams ===
First Team	Position	Second Team
Lorne Chabot, Chicago Black Hawks	G	Tiny Thompson, Boston Bruins
Eddie Shore, Boston Bruins	D	Cy Wentworth, Montreal Maroons
Earl Seibert, New York Rangers	D	Art Coulter, Chicago Black Hawks
Frank Boucher, New York Rangers	C	Cooney Weiland, Detroit Red Wings
Charlie Conacher, Toronto Maple Leafs	RW	Dit Clapper, Boston Bruins
Busher Jackson, Toronto Maple Leafs	LW	Aurel Joliat, Montreal Canadiens
Lester Patrick, New York Rangers	Coach	Dick Irvin, Toronto Maple Leafs

== Player statistics ==
=== Scoring leaders ===
Note: GP = Games played, G = Goals, A = Assists, PTS = Points, PIM = Penalties in minutes

Player	Team	GP	G	A	PTS	PIM
Charlie Conacher	Toronto Maple Leafs	47	36	21	57	24
Syd Howe	St. Louis Eagles/Detroit Red Wings	50	22	25	47	34
Larry Aurie	Detroit Red Wings	48	17	29	46	24
Frank Boucher	New York Rangers	48	13	32	45	2
Busher Jackson	Toronto Maple Leafs	42	22	22	44	27
Herbie Lewis	Detroit Red Wings	47	16	27	43	26
Art Chapman	New York Americans	47	9	34	43	4
Marty Barry	Boston Bruins	48	20	20	40	33
Sweeney Schriner	New York Americans	48	18	22	40	6
Nels Stewart	Boston Bruins	47	21	18	39	45

Source: NHL.

=== Leading goaltenders ===
Note: GP = Games played; Mins = Minutes played; GA = Goals against; SO = Shutouts; GAA = Goals against average

Player	Team	GP	W	L	T	Mins	GA	SO	GAA
Lorne Chabot	Chicago Black Hawks	48	26	17	5	2940	88	8	1.80
Alec Connell	Montreal Maroons	48	24	19	5	2970	92	9	1.86
Normie Smith	Detroit Red Wings	25	12	11	2	1550	52	2	2.01
George Hainsworth	Toronto Maple Leafs	48	30	14	4	2957	111	8	2.25
Tiny Thompson	Boston Bruins	48	26	16	6	2970	112	8	2.26
Dave Kerr	New York Rangers	37	19	12	6	2290	94	4	2.46

Source: NHL.

== Coaches ==
=== American Division ===
- Boston Bruins: Frank Patrick
- Chicago Black Hawks: Clem Loughlin
- Detroit Red Wings: Jack Adams
- New York Rangers: Lester Patrick
- St. Louis Eagles: Eddie Gerard, Georges Boucher

=== Canadian Division ===
- Montreal Canadiens: Leo Dandurand
- Montreal Maroons: Tommy Gorman
- New York Americans: Bullet Joe Simpson
- Toronto Maple Leafs: Dick Irvin

== Debuts ==
The following is a list of players of note who played their first NHL game in 1934–35 (listed with their first team, asterisk(*) marks debut in playoffs):

- Tommy Anderson, Detroit Red Wings
- Bucko McDonald, Detroit Red Wings
- Sweeney Schriner, New York Americans
- Lynn Patrick, New York Rangers
- Toe Blake, Montreal Maroons
- Bill Cowley, St. Louis Eagles
- Art Jackson, Toronto Maple Leafs
- Bob Davidson, Toronto Maple Leafs
- Nick Metz, Toronto Maple Leafs

== Last games ==
The following is a list of players of note that played their last game in the NHL in 1934–35 (listed with their last team):

- John Ross Roach, Detroit Red Wings
- Albert Leduc, Montreal Canadiens
- Norman Gainor, Montreal Maroons
- Alex Smith, New York Americans
- Charley McVeigh, New York Americans
- Normie Himes, New York Americans

== See also ==
- 1934–35 NHL transactions
- List of Stanley Cup champions
- 1934 in sports
- 1935 in sports
