= 1934–35 Chicago Black Hawks season =

NHL ice hockey team season

1934–35 Chicago Black Hawks
- Division: 2nd American
- 1934–35 record: 26–17–5
- Home record: 12–9–3
- Road record: 14–8–2
- Goals for: 118
- Goals against: 88

Team information
- General manager: Frederic McLaughlin
- Coach: Clem Loughlin
- Captain: Vacant
- Arena: Chicago Stadium

Team leaders
- Goals: Johnny Gottselig (19)
- Assists: Howie Morenz (26)
- Points: Paul Thompson (39)
- Penalty minutes: Arthur Coulter (68)
- Wins: Lorne Chabot (26)
- Goals against average: Lorne Chabot (1.88)

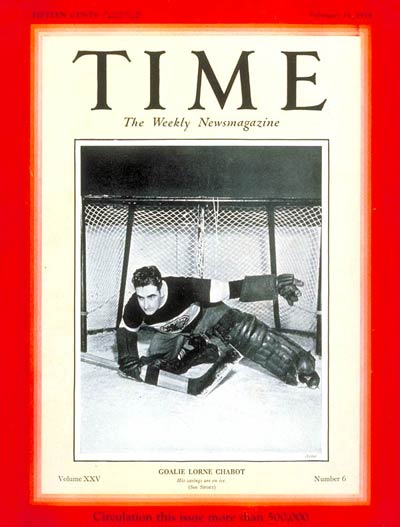
Chicago Black Hawks goaltender Lorne Chabot on the cover of a 1935 Time Magazine

The 1934–35 Chicago Black Hawks season was the team's ninth season in the NHL. The Hawks qualified for the playoffs, but lost to the Montreal Maroons in the semi-finals.

== Offseason ==
The Black Hawks were coming off a Stanley Cup championship, as the Hawks defeated the Detroit Red Wings in the 1934 Stanley Cup Finals to win their first ever championship. The celebration was short lived though, as goaltender Chuck Gardiner died on June 13, 1934, due to a brain hemorrhage. In addition, center Jack Leswick also tragically died on August 4, 1934, after drowning in the Assiniboine River.

In the off-season, the Black Hawks and Montreal Canadiens would make a huge trade, as the Canadiens sent Lorne Chabot, Howie Morenz and Marty Burke to the Hawks in exchange for Lionel Conacher, Roger Jenkins and LeRoy Goldsworthy.

== Regular season ==
The Hawks would rebound, as they would set a team record with 57 points, along with 26 wins, to finish in 2nd place in the American Division, just 1 point behind the Boston Bruins. Chicago would score 118 goals, which placed them 6th in the 9 team NHL, while they would allow a league low 88 goals. Morenz would help the Black Hawks offensively, recording a team record and career high 26 assists, while Johnny Gottselig would score a club high 19 goals. Paul Thompson would lead the team with 39 points, scoring 16 goals and adding 23 assists. Defenseman Arthur Coulter would lead the team with 68 penalty minutes, and lead all defensemen with 12 points. In goal, Lorne Chabot would win the Vezina Trophy, as the Hawks allowed the fewest goals in the NHL. Chabot would post a 1.88 GAA, and win a club record 26 games.

=== Final standings ===
American Division
	GP	W	L	T	GF	GA	PTS
**Boston Bruins**	48	26	16	6	129	112	58
**Chicago Black Hawks**	48	26	17	5	118	88	57
**New York Rangers**	48	22	20	6	137	139	50
Detroit Red Wings	48	19	22	7	127	114	45

Note: GP = Games Played, W = Wins, L = Losses, T = Ties, Pts = Points, GF = Goals For, GA = Goals Against
Teams that qualified for the playoffs are highlighted in bold.

=== Record vs. opponents ===
==== Vs. American Division ====
1934–35 NHL records
Team	BOS	CHI	DET	NYR	Total
Boston	—	1–4–1	5–0–1	3–1–2	**9–5–4**
Chicago	4–1–1	—	3–3	3–1–2	**10–5–3**
Detroit	0–5–1	3–3	—	2–4	**5–12–1**
N.Y. Rangers	1–3–2	1–3–2	4–2	—	**6–8–4**

==== Vs. Canadian Division ====
1934–35 NHL records
Team	MTL	MTM	NYA	STL	TOR	Total
Boston	4–2	1–4–1	4–2	5–1	3–2–1	**17–11–2**
Chicago	4–1–1	3–3	4–2	4–1–1	1–5	**16–12–2**
Detroit	4–1–1	2–3–1	2–1–3	3–3	3–2–1	**14–10–6**
N.Y. Rangers	2–4	2–3–1	3–2–1	5–1	4–2	**16–12–2**

== Schedule and results ==
=== Regular season ===
1934–35 regular season
November

Game	Date	Visitor	Score	Home	Record	Points
1	November 8	Chicago Black Hawks	3–1	St. Louis Eagles	1–0–0	2
2	November 15	Chicago Black Hawks	4–3	Montreal Maroons	2–0–0	4
3	November 18	Toronto Maple Leafs	5–0	Chicago Black Hawks	2–1–0	4
4	November 22	St. Louis Eagles	0–1	Chicago Black Hawks	3–1–0	6
5	November 25	Boston Bruins	0–4	Chicago Black Hawks	4–1–0	8
6	November 27	Chicago Black Hawks	3–2	Boston Bruins	5–1–0	10
7	November 29	Chicago Black Hawks	0–2	New York Americans	5–2–0	10

December

Game	Date	Visitor	Score	Home	Record	Points
8	December 2	New York Americans	2–1	Chicago Black Hawks	5–3–0	10
9	December 9	New York Rangers	0–4	Chicago Black Hawks	6–3–0	12
10	December 11	Detroit Red Wings	0–4	Chicago Black Hawks	7–3–0	14
11	December 16	Montreal Maroons	2–3	Chicago Black Hawks	8–3–0	16
12	December 18	Chicago Black Hawks	1–1	Montreal Canadiens	8–3–1	17
13	December 20	Chicago Black Hawks	4–1	New York Rangers	9–3–1	19
14	December 22	Chicago Black Hawks	0–1	Toronto Maple Leafs	9–4–1	19
15	December 23	Montreal Canadiens	4–1	Chicago Black Hawks	9–5–1	19
16	December 25	Chicago Black Hawks	2–1	Detroit Red Wings	10–5–1	21
17	December 30	St. Louis Eagles	3–3	Chicago Black Hawks	10–5–2	22

January

Game	Date	Visitor	Score	Home	Record	Points
18	January 1	Montreal Maroons	2–1	Chicago Black Hawks	10–6–2	22
19	January 5	Chicago Black Hawks	6–0	Boston Bruins	11–6–2	24
20	January 6	Chicago Black Hawks	2–1	New York Americans	12–6–2	26
21	January 8	Detroit Red Wings	2–1	Chicago Black Hawks	12–7–2	26
22	January 10	Chicago Black Hawks	0–4	Montreal Maroons	12–8–2	26
23	January 12	Chicago Black Hawks	1–5	Toronto Maple Leafs	12–9–2	26
24	January 13	Boston Bruins	1–1	Chicago Black Hawks	12–9–3	27
25	January 15	Toronto Maple Leafs	3–2	Chicago Black Hawks	12–10–3	27
26	January 17	Chicago Black Hawks	5–1	St. Louis Eagles	13–10–3	29
27	January 20	Toronto Maple Leafs	1–2	Chicago Black Hawks	14–10–3	31
28	January 22	Chicago Black Hawks	2–0	New York Americans	15–10–3	33
29	January 24	Chicago Black Hawks	3–3	New York Rangers	15–10–4	34
30	January 27	St. Louis Eagles	3–5	Chicago Black Hawks	16–10–4	36

February

Game	Date	Visitor	Score	Home	Record	Points
31	February 3	New York Americans	2–3	Chicago Black Hawks	17–10–4	38
32	February 5	Montreal Canadiens	1–4	Chicago Black Hawks	18–10–4	40
33	February 7	Chicago Black Hawks	0–1	St. Louis Eagles	18–11–4	40
34	February 10	New York Rangers	2–1	Chicago Black Hawks	18–12–4	40
35	February 12	Chicago Black Hawks	0–3	Montreal Maroons	18–13–4	40
36	February 14	Chicago Black Hawks	3–0	Detroit Red Wings	19–13–4	42
37	February 17	Boston Bruins	2–1	Chicago Black Hawks	19–14–4	42
38	February 21	Chicago Black Hawks	3–1	Montreal Canadiens	20–14–4	44
39	February 23	Chicago Black Hawks	1–4	Toronto Maple Leafs	20–15–4	44
40	February 24	Montreal Maroons	1–6	Chicago Black Hawks	21–15–4	46
41	February 28	Chicago Black Hawks	1–5	Detroit Red Wings	21–16–4	46

March

Game	Date	Visitor	Score	Home	Record	Points
42	March 3	Montreal Canadiens	0–3	Chicago Black Hawks	22–16–4	48
43	March 5	New York Americans	1–5	Chicago Black Hawks	23–16–4	50
44	March 10	New York Rangers	1–1	Chicago Black Hawks	23–16–5	51
45	March 14	Detroit Red Wings	4–3	Chicago Black Hawks	23–17–5	51
46	March 16	Chicago Black Hawks	5–2	Boston Bruins	24–17–5	53
47	March 17	Chicago Black Hawks	5–2	New York Rangers	25–17–5	55
48	March 19	Chicago Black Hawks	4–2	Montreal Canadiens	26–17–5	57

Legend: Win (2 points) Loss (0 points) Tie (1 point)

== Playoffs ==
The Black Hawks would face the Montreal Maroons in the opening round of the playoffs in their quest for their second-straight Stanley Cup, as the teams faced off in a two-game, total goals series. The teams would play to a 0–0 draw in the opening game in Montreal, then in the 2nd game in Chicago, the series would come to an end as the Maroons surprised the Black Hawks with a 1–0 OT victory, drawing an end to the Hawks season.

=== Maroons 1, Black Hawks 0 ===
==== NHL quarter-finals ====
===== (A2) Chicago Black Hawks vs. (C2) Montreal Maroons =====
March 23	Chicago Black Hawks	0 – 0	Montreal Maroons	Montreal Forum	Recap
No scoring		First period	No scoring
No scoring		Second period	No scoring
No scoring		Third period	No scoring
Chabot (0-0-1)		Goalie stats	Connell (0-0-1)

March 26	Montreal Maroons	1 – 0	OT	Chicago Black Hawks	Chicago Stadium	Recap
No scoring		First period		No scoring
No scoring		Second period		No scoring
No scoring		Third period		No scoring
Northcott (1) – pp – (Gracie) – 4:02		First overtime period		No scoring
Connell (1-0-1)		Goalie stats		Chabot (0-1-1)

Montreal wins series 1 – 0

== Player statistics ==
=== Scoring leaders ===
Player	GP	G	A	Pts	PIM
Paul Thompson	48	16	23	39	20
Johnny Gottselig	48	19	18	37	16
Howie Morenz	48	8	26	34	21
Tom Cook	48	13	18	31	33
Mush March	48	13	17	30	48

=== Goaltending ===
Player	GP	TOI	W	L	T	GA	SO	GAA
Lorne Chabot	48	2940	26	17	5	88	8	1.80

=== Scoring leaders ===
Player	GP	G	A	Pts	PIM
Lolo Couture	2	0	0	0	5
Arthur Coulter	2	0	0	0	5
Marty Burke	2	0	0	0	2
Norm Locking	2	0	0	0	2
Tom Cook	2	0	0	0	2

=== Goaltending ===
Player	GP	TOI	W	L	T	GA	SO	GAA
Lorne Chabot	2	124	0	1	1	1	1	0.48
