= Leroy Goldsworthy =

American ice hockey player (1906–1980)

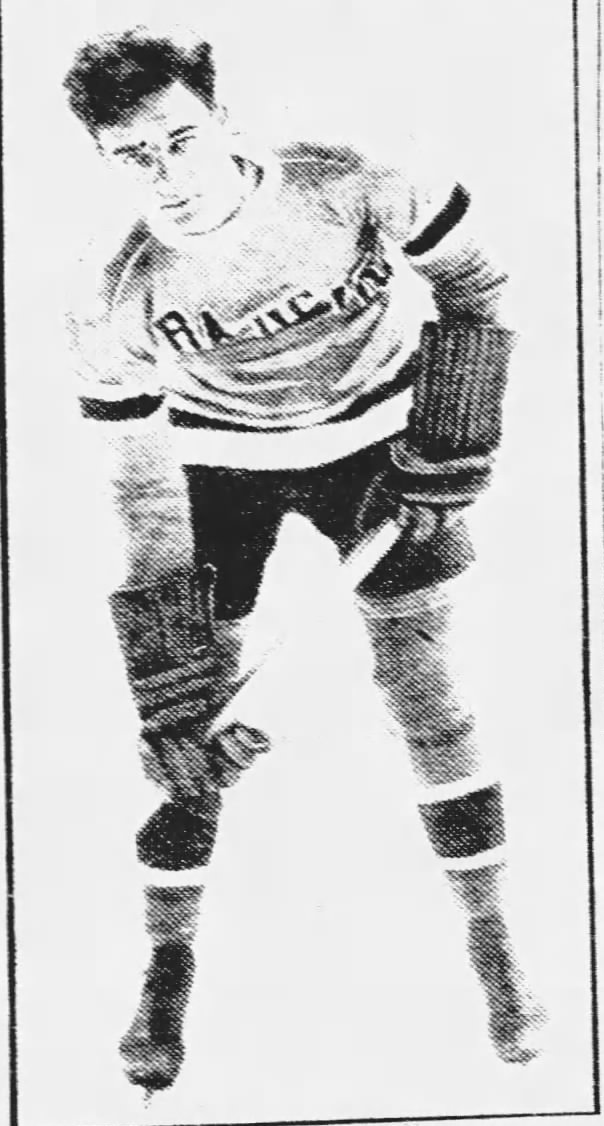
- Born: October 18, 1906 Two Harbors, Minnesota, U.S.
- Died: March 16, 1980 (aged 73) Edmonton, Alberta, Canada
- Height: 6 ft 0 in (183 cm)
- Weight: 165 lb (75 kg; 11 st 11 lb)
- Position: Right wing
- Shot: Right
- Played for: New York Rangers; Detroit Red Wings; Chicago Black Hawks; Montreal Canadiens; Boston Bruins; New York Americans
- Playing career: 1925–1942

Leroy Delano "Goldy" Goldsworthy (October 18, 1906 – March 16, 1980) was an American ice hockey forward. He played in the National Hockey League between 1929 and 1939.

== Biography ==
Goldsworthy was born in Two Harbors, Minnesota and raised in Edmonton, Alberta. He moved to Edmonton with his family in 1909 when he was three years old. An excellent baseball and hockey player, he started his National Hockey League career with the New York Rangers in 1929. He also played for the Detroit Red Wings, Chicago Black Hawks, Montreal Canadiens, Boston Bruins, and New York Americans. He retired from the NHL after the 1939 season. He won the Stanley Cup in 1934 with the Chicago Black Hawks.

Goldsworthy died on March 16, 1980.

== Jack Leswick tragedy ==
Goldsworthy along with fellow Black Hawk Rosario Couture were tasked with identifying the body of teammate Jack Leswick after his body was pulled from the Assiniboine River in August 1934.

== Career statistics ==
=== Regular season and playoffs ===
			Regular season					Playoffs
Season	Team	League	GP	G	A	Pts	PIM	GP	G	A	Pts	PIM
1924–25	Edmonton Victorias	EJrHL	1	0	0	0	0	3	0	0	0	2
1925–26	Edmonton Eskimos	WHL	11	0	0	0	0	—	—	—	—	—
1926–27	Springfield Indians	Can-Am	31	2	1	3	4	6	1	0	1	8
1927–28	Springfield Indians	Can-Am	38	8	5	13	32	4	2	0	2	2
1928–29	Springfield Indians	Can-Am	39	9	7	16	40	—	—	—	—	—
1928–29	New York Rangers	NHL	—	—	—	—	—	1	0	0	0	0
1929–30	New York Rangers	NHL	44	4	1	5	16	4	0	0	0	2
1930–31	Detroit Falcons	NHL	12	1	0	1	2	—	—	—	—	—
1930–31	London Tecumsehs	IHL	25	9	5	14	27	—	—	—	—	—
1930–31	Detroit Olympics	IHL	9	4	0	4	4	—	—	—	—	—
1931–32	Detroit Olympics	IHL	47	16	9	25	16	6	2	0	2	2
1932–33	Detroit Red Wings	NHL	25	3	6	9	6	2	0	0	0	0
1932–33	Detroit Olympics	IHL	17	12	2	14	22	—	—	—	—	—
1933–34	Chicago Black Hawks	NHL	27	3	3	6	0	7	0	0	0	0
1933–34	London Tecumsehs	IHL	18	11	4	15	10	—	—	—	—	—
1934–35	Chicago Black Hawks	NHL	7	0	0	0	2	—	—	—	—	—
1934–35	Montreal Canadiens	NHL	33	20	9	29	13	2	1	0	1	0
1934–35	London Tecumsehs	IHL	7	4	1	5	6	—	—	—	—	—
1935–36	Montreal Canadiens	NHL	47	15	11	26	8	—	—	—	—	—
1936–37	Boston Bruins	NHL	47	8	6	14	8	3	0	0	0	0
1937–38	Boston Bruins	NHL	46	9	10	19	14	3	0	0	0	2
1938–39	New York Americans	NHL	48	3	11	14	10	2	0	0	0	0
1939–40	Cleveland Barons	IAHL	56	9	22	31	10	—	—	—	—	—
1940–41	Buffalo Bisons	AHL	56	6	18	24	8	—	—	—	—	—
1941–42	Dallas Texans	AHA	50	15	24	39	31	—	—	—	—	—
1943–44	Edmonton Victorias	Exhib	—	—	—	—	—	—	—	—	—	—
1943–44	Edmonton Victorias	Al-Cup	—	—	—	—	—	4	0	0	0	0
1945–46	Dallas Texans	USHL	1	0	0	0	0	—	—	—	—	—
NHL totals			336	66	57	123	79	24	1	0	1	4
