= 1934–35 New York Rangers season =

NHL hockey team season

1934–35 New York Rangers
- Division: 3rd American
- 1934–35 record: 22–20–6
- Home record: 11–8–5
- Road record: 11–12–1
- Goals for: 137
- Goals against: 139

Team information
- General manager: Lester Patrick
- Coach: Lester Patrick
- Captain: Bill Cook
- Arena: Madison Square Garden

Team leaders
- Goals: Cecil Dillon (25)
- Assists: Frank Boucher (32)
- Points: Frank Boucher (45)
- Penalty minutes: Earl Seibert (86)
- Wins: Dave Kerr (19)
- Goals against average: Dave Kerr (2.46)

The 1934–35 New York Rangers season was the franchise's ninth season. During the regular season, the Rangers finished in third place in the American Division with 50 points, and qualified for the playoffs. In the first round of the playoffs, the Rangers defeated the Montreal Canadiens in a two-game total goal series, 6–5, to advance to the NHL semi-finals. There, New York lost 5–4 in another two-game total goal series to the Montreal Maroons.

== Regular season ==
=== Final standings ===
American Division
	GP	W	L	T	GF	GA	PTS
**Boston Bruins**	48	26	16	6	129	112	58
**Chicago Black Hawks**	48	26	17	5	118	88	57
**New York Rangers**	48	22	20	6	137	139	50
Detroit Red Wings	48	19	22	7	127	114	45

Note: GP = Games Played, W = Wins, L = Losses, T = Ties, Pts = Points, GF = Goals For, GA = Goals Against
Teams that qualified for the playoffs are highlighted in bold.

=== Record vs. opponents ===
==== Vs. American Division ====
1934–35 NHL records
Team	**BOS**	**CHI**	**DET**	**NYR**	**Total**
Boston	—	1–4–1	5–0–1	3–1–2	**9–5–4**
Chicago	4–1–1	—	3–3	3–1–2	**10–5–3**
Detroit	0–5–1	3–3	—	2–4	**5–12–1**
N.Y. Rangers	1–3–2	1–3–2	4–2	—	**6–8–4**

==== Vs. Canadian Division ====
1934–35 NHL records
Team	**MTL**	**MTM**	**NYA**	**STL**	**TOR**	**Total**
Boston	4–2	1–4–1	4–2	5–1	3–2–1	**17–11–2**
Chicago	4–1–1	3–3	4–2	4–1–1	1–5	**16–12–2**
Detroit	4–1–1	2–3–1	2–1–3	3–3	3–2–1	**14–10–6**
N.Y. Rangers	2–4	2–3–1	3–2–1	5–1	4–2	**16–12–2**

== Schedule and results ==
1934–35 regular season
November: 2–4–0 (home: 2–1–0; road: 0–3–0)

Game	November	Opponent	Score	Record
1	10	@ St. Louis Eagles	4–2	0–1–0
2	15	@ Detroit Red Wings	8–2	0–2–0
3	18	St. Louis Eagles	5–0	1–2–0
4	22	Detroit Red Wings	4 – 3 OT	2–2–0
5	25	@ New York Americans	3–1	2–3–0
6	27	Montreal Canadiens	3–2	2–4–0

December: 4–6–1 (home: 2–3–1; road: 2–3–0)

Game	December	Opponent	Score	Record
7	1	Montreal Maroons	5–2	2–5–0
8	4	@ Montreal Canadiens	5–3	2–6–0
9	8	@ Toronto Maple Leafs	5–2	3–6–0
10	9	@ Chicago Black Hawks	4–0	3–7–0
11	11	Toronto Maple Leafs	8–4	3–8–0
12	16	Boston Bruins	2–1	4–8–0
13	18	@ Boston Bruins	5–3	4–9–0
14	20	Chicago Black Hawks	4–1	4–10–0
15	22	@ Montreal Maroons	2–1	5–10–0
16	25	New York Americans	3–1	6–10–0
17	30	Boston Bruins	0 – 0 OT	6–10–1

January: 8–1–3 (home: 4–0–3; road: 4–1–0)

Game	January	Opponent	Score	Record
18	1	@ Boston Bruins	5–2	6–11–1
19	3	Detroit Red Wings	3–2	7–11–1
20	8	Montreal Maroons	1 – 1 OT	7–11–2
21	12	@ New York Americans	3–1	8–11–2
22	13	St. Louis Eagles	3–2	9–11–2
23	15	New York Americans	1 – 1 OT	9–11–3
24	20	Montreal Canadiens	7–1	10–11–3
25	22	@ Montreal Canadiens	7–0	11–11–3
26	24	Chicago Black Hawks	3 – 3 OT	11–11–4
27	27	@ New York Americans	4–2	12–11–4
28	29	Toronto Maple Leafs	7–5	13–11–4
29	31	@ Toronto Maple Leafs	3–2	14–11–4

February: 7–4–1 (home: 3–2–1; road: 4–2–0)

Game	February	Opponent	Score	Record
30	3	Detroit Red Wings	5–3	15–11–4
31	5	@ Montreal Maroons	5–4	16–11–4
32	7	New York Americans	6–4	16–12–4
33	10	@ Chicago Black Hawks	2–1	17–12–4
34	12	@ St. Louis Eagles	5–1	18–12–4
35	14	Toronto Maple Leafs	3–0	19–12–4
36	16	@ Toronto Maple Leafs	5–1	19–13–4
37	17	@ Detroit Red Wings	5 – 3 OT	20–13–4
38	19	St. Louis Eagles	2–1	21–13–4
39	24	Boston Bruins	0 – 0 OT	21–13–5
40	26	@ Montreal Maroons	3–1	21–14–5
41	28	Montreal Maroons	5–2	21–15–5

March: 1–5–1 (home: 0–2–0; road: 1–3–1)

Game	March	Opponent	Score	Record
42	5	@ Boston Bruins	3–1	21–16–5
43	7	@ Detroit Red Wings	6–1	21–17–5
44	9	@ St. Louis Eagles	5–1	22–17–5
45	10	@ Chicago Black Hawks	1 – 1 OT	22–17–6
46	12	Montreal Canadiens	4–3	22–18–6
47	14	@ Montreal Canadiens	5–4	22–19–6
48	17	Chicago Black Hawks	5–2	22–20–6

Legend: Win (2 points) Loss (0 points) Tie (1 point)

== Playoffs ==
1935 Stanley Cup playoffs
Quarterfinals vs. (C3) Montreal Canadiens – Rangers win 6 goals to 5 goals

Game	Date	Visitor	Score	Home	OT	Series
1	March 24	Montreal Canadiens	1–2	New York Rangers		New York Rangers lead series 2 goals to 1 goal
2	March 26	New York Rangers	4–4	Montreal Canadiens	OT	New York Rangers win series 6 goals to 5 goals

Semifinals vs. (C2) Montreal Maroons – Maroons win 5 goals to 4 goals

Game	Date	Visitor	Score	Home	OT	Series
1	March 28	Montreal Maroons	2–1	New York Rangers		Montreal leads series 2 goals to 1 goal
2	March 30	New York Rangers	3–3	Montreal Maroons	OT	Montreal wins series 5 goals to 4 goals

Legend: Win Loss Tie

== Player statistics ==
Skaters

Regular season
Player	GP	G	A	Pts	PIM
Frank Boucher	48	13	32	45	2
Bill Cook	48	21	15	36	23
Cecil Dillon	48	25	9	34	4
Frederick Cook	48	13	21	34	26
Murray Murdoch	48	14	15	29	14
Earl Seibert	48	6	19	25	86
Lynn Patrick	48	9	13	22	17
Bert Connelly	47	10	11	21	23
Melville Keeling	47	15	4	19	14
Charlie Mason	46	5	9	14	14
Ehrhardt Heller	47	3	11	14	31
Ivan Johnson	26	2	3	5	34
Art Somers	41	0	5	5	4
Alex Levinsky^{†}	21	0	4	4	6
Vic Ripley^{‡}	4	0	2	2	2
Bill MacKenzie^{†}	15	1	0	1	10
Harold Starr^{†}	30	0	0	0	26

Playoffs
Player	GP	G	A	Pts	PIM
Lynn Patrick	4	2	2	4	0
Melville Keeling	4	2	1	3	0
Cecil Dillon	4	2	1	3	0
Bill Cook	4	1	2	3	7
Frank Boucher	4	0	3	3	0
Murray Murdoch	4	0	2	2	4
Frederick Cook	4	2	0	2	0
Ehrhardt Heller	4	0	1	1	4
Charlie Mason	4	0	1	1	0
Bert Connelly	4	1	0	1	0
Harold Starr	4	0	0	0	2
Bill MacKenzie	3	0	0	0	0
Art Somers	2	0	0	0	2
Ivan Johnson	3	0	0	0	2
Earl Seibert	4	0	0	0	6

Goaltenders

Regular season
Player	GP	TOI	W	L	T	GA	GAA	SO
Dave Kerr	37	2290	19	12	6	94	2.46	4
Andy Aitkenhead	10	610	3	7	0	37	3.64	1
Percy Jackson^{†}	1	60	0	1	0	8	8.00	0

Playoffs
Player	GP	TOI	W	L	T	GA	GAA	SO
Dave Kerr	4	240	1	1	2	10	2.50	0

|}

^{†}Denotes player spent time with another team before joining Rangers. Stats reflect time with Rangers only.
^{‡}Traded mid-season. Stats reflect time with Rangers only.

Note:

Pos = Position;GP = Games played; G = Goals; A = Assists; Pts = Points; PIM = Penalty minutes; +/- = Plus/minus; PPG = Power-play goals; SHG = Short-handed goals; GWG = Game-winning goals
Pos = Position;GP = Games played; Min, TOI = Minutes played; W = Wins; L = Losses; T,T/OT = Ties; OTL = Overtime losses; GA = Goals-against; GAA = Goals-against average; SO = Shutouts; SA = Shots against; SV = Shots saved;SV% = Save percentage;
