= 1934–35 NHL transactions =

The following is a list of all team-to-team transactions that have occurred in the National Hockey League (NHL) during the 1934–35 NHL season. It lists which team each player has been traded to and for which player(s) or other consideration(s), if applicable.

== Transactions ==
May 12, 1934	To Toronto Maple Leafs cash	To Boston Bruins loan of Jack Shill for the 1934-35 season
May 12, 1934	To Toronto Maple Leafs cash	To Boston Bruins Charlie Sands
September 20, 1934	To Montreal Maroons Al Shields	To St. Louis Eagles Irv Frew future considerations^{1} (Vern Ayres) (Normie Smith)
September 23, 1934	To Montreal Maroons Gus Marker	To Detroit Red Wings Wally Kilrea
October 1, 1934	To Detroit Red Wings rights to Ossie Asmundson	To New York Rangers cash
October 2, 1934	To St. Louis Eagles future considerations^{2} (Glenn Brydson)	To Montreal Maroons Alec Connell
October 2, 1934	To Boston Bruins Johnny Gagnon	To Montreal Canadiens Joe Lamb
October 3, 1934	To Montreal Canadiens Lionel Conacher; Leroy Goldsworthy; Roger Jenkins	To Chicago Black Hawks Marty Burke; Lorne Chabot; Howie Morenz
October 3, 1934	To Montreal Maroons Lionel Conacher rights to Herb Cain	To Montreal Canadiens rights to Nels Crutchfield
October 10, 1934	To Boston Bruins Gene Carrigan	To Detroit Red Wings George Patterson
October 12, 1934	To St. Louis Eagles Mickey Blake	To Montreal Maroons cash
October 17, 1934	To Montreal Canadiens cash	To Chicago Black Hawks Leroy Goldsworthy
October 18, 1934	To Boston Bruins Art Giroux	To Montreal Canadiens cash
October 18, 1934	To Boston Bruins cash	To New York Americans Alex Smith
October 22, 1934	To St. Louis Eagles Burr Williams	To Detroit Red Wings Normie Smith
October 28, 1934	To Montreal Maroons cash	To Detroit Red Wings Lorne Duguid
November 1, 1934	To Boston Bruins Jean Pusie	To New York Rangers Percy Jackson
November 2, 1934	To Boston Bruins cash	To New York Americans Harry Oliver
November 5, 1934	To Boston Bruins Tony Savage	To Montreal Canadiens Tommy Filmore cash
November 18, 1934	To Boston Bruins Percy Jackson	To New York Rangers cash
November 28, 1934	To St. Louis Eagles George Patterson	To Detroit Red Wings Mickey Blake cash
November 29, 1934	To St. Louis Eagles rights to Vic Ripley	To New York Rangers cash
December 3, 1934	To Boston Bruins Jack Portland	To Montreal Canadiens Tony Savage $7,500 cash
December 4, 1934	To Boston Bruins Joe Lamb	To Montreal Canadiens cash
December 4, 1934	To St. Louis Eagles Joe Lamb	To Boston Bruins Max Kaminsky; Desse Roche
December 8, 1934	To Boston Bruins cash	To Montreal Canadiens Desse Roche
December 14, 1934	To Montreal Maroons cash	To New York Rangers Dave Kerr
December 14, 1934	To Boston Bruins Walter Jackson	To New York Americans Hap Emms; Obs Heximer
December 18, 1934	To Montreal Canadiens Leroy Goldsworthy	To Chicago Black Hawks cash
December 23, 1934	To Montreal Maroons cash	To New York Rangers Harold Starr
December 25, 1934	To New York Americans cash	To Montreal Maroons Bob Gracie
December 28, 1934	To Boston Bruins Paul Haynes	To Montreal Maroons cash
January 9, 1935	To Boston Bruins cash	To Montreal Canadiens Johnny Gagnon
January 10, 1935	To St. Louis Eagles Frank Jerwa	To Boston Bruins Gerry Shannon
January 15, 1935	To Chicago Black Hawks Alex Levinsky	To New York Rangers cash
February 15, 1935	To St. Louis Eagles Ted Graham $50,000 cash	To Detroit Red Wings Ralph Bowman; Syd Howe
February 13, 1935	To Toronto Maple Leafs Frank Finnigan	To St. Louis Eagles cash

Notes

1. Trade completed on October 22, 1934.
2. Trade completed on October 22, 1934.
