= List of Montreal Maroons players =

This is a complete list of ice hockey players who played for the Montreal Maroons in the National Hockey League (NHL). It includes players that played at least one regular season or playoff game for the Montreal Maroons while the team was a member of the NHL from 1924 until 1938. Founded in 1924 as an expansion team along with the Boston Bruins, 88 different players, 8 goaltenders and 80 skaters, played with the Maroons. The Maroons won the Stanley Cup twice, in 1926 and 1935, while eleven players have been inducted into the Hockey Hall of Fame.

The "Seasons" column lists the first year of the season of the player's first game and the last year of the season of the player's last game. For example, a player who played one game in the 1924–25 season would be listed as playing with the team from 1924–25, regardless of what calendar year the game occurred within.

== Key ==
- Hockey Hall of Famer

Abbreviations
| C | Center |
| D | Defenseman |
| L | Left wing |
| R | Right wing |

Goaltenders
| W | Wins |
| L | Losses |
| T | Ties |
| SO | Shutouts |
| GAA | Goals against average |
| SV% | Save percentage |

Skaters
| GP | Games played |
| G | Goals |
| A | Assists |
| Pts | Points |
| PIM | Penalty minutes |

The "Seasons" column lists the first year of the season of the player's first game and the last year of the season of the player's last game. For example, a player who played one game in the 2000–2001 season would be listed as playing with the team from 2000–2001, regardless of what calendar year the game occurred within.

== Skaters ==
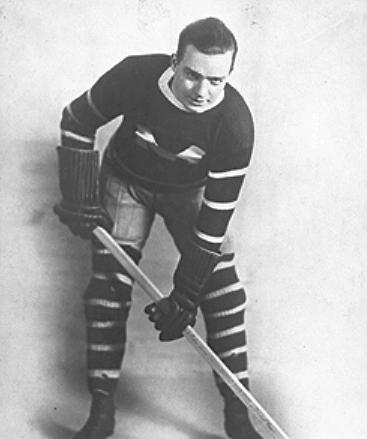
Nels Stewart spent 7 seasons with the Maroons, won the Hart Memorial Trophy twice, and helped the team win the Stanley Cup in 1926

| | | | Regular season | | | | | Playoffs | | | | |
| Player | Position | Years | GP | G | A | Pts | PIM | GP | G | A | Pts | PIM |
|---|---|---|---|---|---|---|---|---|---|---|---|---|
| Vern Ayres | D | 1933–1934 | 17 | 0 | 0 | 0 | 19 | — | — | — | — | — |
| Andy Bellemer | D | 1932–1933 | 15 | 0 | 0 | 0 | 0 | — | — | — | — | — |
| Louis Berlinquette | L | 1924–1925 | 29 | 4 | 2 | 6 | 22 | — | — | — | — | — |
| Mickey Blake | L | 1932–1933 | 1 | 0 | 0 | 0 | 0 | — | — | — | — | — |
| Toe Blake (1966) | L | 1934–1935 | 8 | 0 | 0 | 0 | 0 | 1 | 0 | 0 | 0 | 0 |
| Russ Blinco | C | 1933–1938 | 220 | 56 | 54 | 110 | 22 | 19 | 3 | 3 | 6 | 4 |
| Georges Boucher (1960) | D | 1928–1931 | 79 | 3 | 7 | 10 | 85 | 3 | 0 | 0 | 0 | 2 |
| Punch Broadbent (1962) | R | 1924–1927 | 108 | 35 | 16 | 51 | 275 | 6 | 2 | 1 | 3 | 14 |
| Bernie Brophy | L | 1925–1926 | 10 | 0 | 0 | 0 | 0 | — | — | — | — | — |
| Fred Brown | L | 1927–1928 | 19 | 1 | 0 | 1 | 0 | 9 | 0 | 0 | 0 | 0 |
| Glenn Brydson | R | 1930–1934 | 146 | 27 | 35 | 62 | 93 | 9 | 0 | 0 | 0 | 4 |
| Francis Cain | D | 1924–1926 | 38 | 4 | 0 | 4 | 27 | — | — | — | — | — |
| Herb Cain | L | 1933–1938 | 211 | 53 | 61 | 114 | 71 | 19 | 2 | 2 | 4 | 2 |
| George Carroll | D | 1924–1925 | 5 | 0 | 0 | 0 | 2 | — | — | — | — | — |
| Frank Carson | R | 1925–1928 | 81 | 4 | 5 | 9 | 28 | 15 | 0 | 0 | 0 | 2 |
| Gerry Carson | D | 1936–1937 | 42 | 1 | 3 | 4 | 28 | 5 | 0 | 0 | 0 | 4 |
| Lionel Conacher (1994) | D | 1930–1937 | 259 | 33 | 65 | 98 | 351 | 23 | 0 | 2 | 2 | 20 |
| Tom Cook | C | 1937–1938 | 21 | 2 | 4 | 6 | 0 | — | — | — | — | — |
| Maurice Croghan | D | 1937–1938 | 16 | 0 | 0 | 0 | 4 | — | — | — | — | — |
| Chuck Dinsmore | C | 1924–1930 | 100 | 6 | 2 | 8 | 50 | 8 | 1 | 0 | 1 | 2 |
| Babe Donnelly | D | 1926–1927 | 34 | 0 | 1 | 1 | 14 | 2 | 0 | 0 | 0 | 0 |
| Lorne Duguid | L | 1931–1934 | 66 | 4 | 8 | 12 | 44 | 2 | 0 | 0 | 0 | 4 |
| Red Dutton (1958) | D | 1926–1930 | 173 | 15 | 26 | 41 | 439 | 15 | 1 | 0 | 1 | 33 |
| Hap Emms | L | 1926–1928 | 18 | 0 | 1 | 1 | 10 | — | — | — | — | — |
| Stewart Evans | D | 1933–1938 | 216 | 23 | 32 | 55 | 259 | 19 | 0 | 0 | 0 | 12 |
| Irv Frew | D | 1933–1934 | 30 | 2 | 1 | 3 | 41 | 4 | 0 | 0 | 0 | 6 |
| Dutch Gainor | C | 1934–1935 | 35 | 0 | 4 | 4 | 2 | — | — | — | — | — |
| John Gallagher | D | 1930–1933 | 60 | 6 | 2 | 8 | 53 | 2 | 0 | 0 | 0 | 0 |
| Bob Gracie | C | 1934–1938 | 175 | 44 | 66 | 110 | 92 | 15 | 1 | 5 | 6 | 4 |
| Ted Graham | D | 1933–1934 | 19 | 2 | 1 | 3 | 10 | — | — | — | — | — |
| Paul Haynes | C | 1930–1935 | 134 | 24 | 31 | 55 | 36 | 10 | 0 | 1 | 1 | 4 |
| Henry Hicks | D | 1928–1929 | 44 | 2 | 0 | 2 | 27 | — | — | — | — | — |
| Albert Holway | D | 1925–1927 | 30 | 0 | 0 | 0 | 8 | 4 | 0 | 0 | 0 | 0 |
| George Horne | R | 1925–1927 | 15 | 0 | 0 | 0 | 2 | — | — | — | — | — |
| Al Huggins | L | 1930–1931 | 20 | 1 | 1 | 2 | 2 | — | — | — | — | — |
| Roger Jenkins | R | 1936–1937 | 1 | 0 | 0 | 0 | 0 | — | — | — | — | — |
| Max Kaminsky | C | 1936–1937 | 6 | 0 | 0 | 0 | 0 | — | — | — | — | — |
| Wally Kilrea | R | 1932–1934 | 64 | 4 | 8 | 12 | 9 | 6 | 0 | 0 | 0 | 0 |
| Hobie Kitchen | D | 1925–1926 | 30 | 5 | 2 | 7 | 16 | — | — | — | — | — |
| Joe Lamb | R | 1927–1936 | 86 | 12 | 9 | 21 | 95 | 11 | 1 | 0 | 1 | 34 |
| Fred Lowrey | R | 1924–1926 | 37 | 1 | 1 | 2 | 8 | — | — | — | — | — |
| Bill MacKenzie | D | 1933–1937 | 62 | 4 | 4 | 8 | 26 | 4 | 0 | 0 | 0 | 0 |
| Gus Marker | R | 1934–1938 | 187 | 37 | 43 | 80 | 85 | 15 | 2 | 2 | 4 | 6 |
| Cliff McBride | R | 1928–1929 | 1 | 0 | 0 | 0 | 0 | — | — | — | — | — |
| Stan McCabe | L | 1932–1934 | 9 | 0 | 0 | 0 | 4 | — | — | — | — | — |
| Sammy McManus | L | 1934–1935 | 25 | 0 | 1 | 1 | 8 | 1 | 0 | 0 | 0 | 0 |
| Jack McVicar | D | 1930–1932 | 88 | 2 | 4 | 6 | 63 | 6 | 0 | 0 | 0 | 2 |
| Bill Miller | C | 1934–1936 | 30 | 3 | 0 | 3 | 2 | 7 | 0 | 0 | 0 | 0 |
| Dunc Munro | D | 1924–1931 | 191 | 27 | 17 | 44 | 158 | 17 | 2 | 2 | 4 | 16 |
| Gerry Munro | D | 1924–1925 | 30 | 1 | 0 | 1 | 37 | — | — | — | — | — |
| Reg Noble (1962) | C | 1924–1933 | 123 | 20 | 23 | 43 | 280 | 8 | 1 | 1 | 2 | 10 |
| Baldy Northcott | D | 1928–1938 | 400 | 128 | 105 | 233 | 264 | 31 | 8 | 5 | 13 | 14 |
| Russell Oatman | L | 1926–1929 | 79 | 16 | 8 | 24 | 78 | 11 | 1 | 0 | 1 | 18 |
| Ernie Parkes | R | 1924–1925 | 17 | 0 | 0 | 0 | 2 | — | — | — | — | — |
| Bill Phillips | C | 1929–1930 | 27 | 1 | 1 | 2 | 6 | 4 | 0 | 0 | 0 | 2 |
| Merlyn Phillips | C | 1925–1933 | 272 | 51 | 24 | 75 | 222 | 24 | 5 | 1 | 6 | 19 |
| Hugh Plaxton | L | 1932–1933 | 15 | 1 | 2 | 3 | 4 | — | — | — | — | — |
| Yip Radley | D | 1936–1937 | 17 | 0 | 1 | 1 | 13 | — | — | — | — | — |
| Earl Robinson | R | 1928–1938 | 359 | 73 | 88 | 161 | 116 | 25 | 5 | 4 | 9 | 0 |
| Des Roche | R | 1930–1933 | 24 | 0 | 1 | 1 | 6 | — | — | — | — | — |
| Earl Roche | L | 1930–1933 | 47 | 2 | 0 | 2 | 18 | 2 | 0 | 0 | 0 | 0 |
| Sam Rothschild | L | 1924–1927 | 83 | 8 | 6 | 14 | 21 | 6 | 0 | 0 | 0 | 0 |
| Paul Runge | C | 1933–1938 | 73 | 9 | 17 | 26 | 27 | 5 | 0 | 0 | 0 | 4 |
| Ganton Scott | R | 1924–1925 | 28 | 1 | 1 | 2 | 0 | — | — | — | — | — |
| Gerry Shannon | L | 1936–1938 | 67 | 9 | 10 | 19 | 33 | 5 | 0 | 1 | 1 | 0 |
| Al Shields | D | 1934–1938 | 135 | 11 | 22 | 33 | 193 | 10 | 0 | 1 | 1 | 12 |
| Babe Siebert (1964) | L | 1925–1932 | 286 | 83 | 74 | 157 | 619 | 24 | 4 | 1 | 5 | 42 |
| Alf Skinner | R | 1924–1925 | 17 | 1 | 1 | 2 | 16 | — | — | — | — | — |
| Des Smith | D | 1937–1938 | 40 | 3 | 1 | 4 | 47 | — | — | — | — | — |
| Hooley Smith (1972) | C | 1927–1936 | 387 | 130 | 151 | 281 | 632 | 32 | 7 | 4 | 11 | 63 |
| Harold Starr | D | 1931–1932 | 47 | 1 | 2 | 3 | 47 | 7 | 0 | 0 | 0 | 0 |
| Nels Stewart (1952) | C | 1925–1932 | 288 | 185 | 68 | 253 | 647 | 25 | 4 | 6 | 10 | 37 |
| Bill Touhey | L | 1927–1928 | 29 | 2 | 0 | 2 | 2 | — | — | — | — | — |
| Dave Trottier | L | 1928–1938 | 435 | 120 | 112 | 232 | 501 | 31 | 4 | 3 | 7 | 39 |
| Carl Voss | C | 1936–1938 | 23 | 0 | 2 | 2 | 4 | 5 | 1 | 0 | 1 | 0 |
| Jimmy Ward | R | 1927–1938 | 491 | 143 | 124 | 267 | 455 | 35 | 4 | 4 | 8 | 26 |
| Aubrey Webster | R | 1934–1935 | 4 | 0 | 0 | 0 | 0 | — | — | — | — | — |
| Cy Wentworth | D | 1932–1938 | 282 | 21 | 38 | 59 | 192 | 21 | 4 | 5 | 9 | 2 |
| Archie Wilcox | R | 1929–1934 | 186 | 8 | 13 | 21 | 156 | 12 | 1 | 0 | 1 | 8 |

== Goaltenders ==
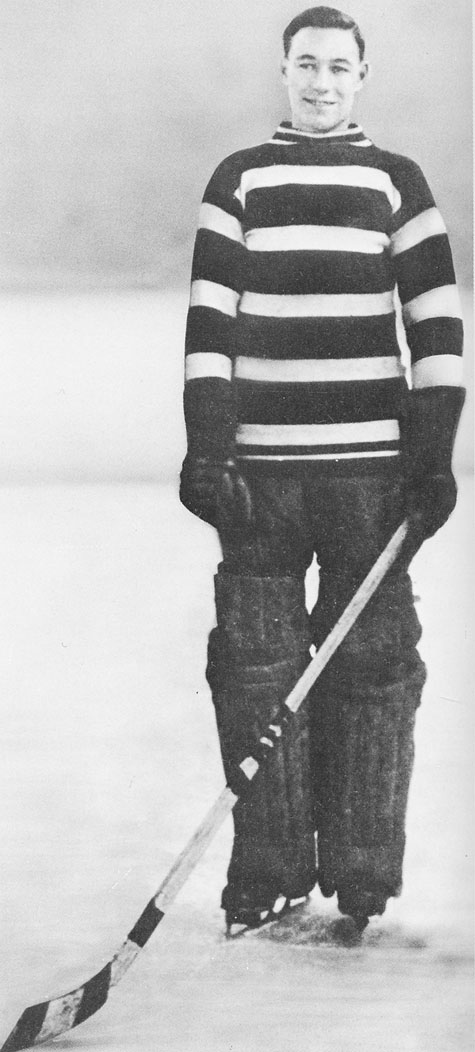
Shown with the Ottawa Senators, Clint Benedict played 204 games with the Maroons, helping the team win the 1926 Stanley Cup

| | | Regular season | | | | | | | Playoffs | | | | | |
| Player | Years | GP | W | L | T | SO | GAA | SV% | GP | W | L | SO | GAA | SV% |
|---|---|---|---|---|---|---|---|---|---|---|---|---|---|---|
| Clint Benedict (1965) | 1924–1930 | 204 | 93 | 85 | 25 | 39 | 1.78 | — | 15 | 7 | 4 | 5 | 0.97 | — |
| Bill Beveridge | 1935–1938 | 101 | 38 | 49 | 14 | 4 | 2.57 | — | 5 | 2 | 3 | 0 | 2.20 | — |
| Lorne Chabot | 1935–1936 | 16 | 8 | 3 | 5 | 2 | 2.08 | — | 3 | 0 | 3 | 0 | 1.21 | — |
| Alec Connell (1958) | 1934–1937 | 75 | 34 | 30 | 11 | 11 | 1.99 | — | 7 | 5 | 0 | 2 | 1.12 | — |
| Abbie Cox | 1929–1930 | 1 | 1 | 0 | 0 | 0 | 2.00 | — | — | — | — | — | — | — |
| Dave Kerr | 1930–1934 | 102 | 46 | 37 | 18 | 11 | 2.36 | — | 8 | 1 | 6 | 1 | 2.50 | — |
| Normie Smith | 1931–1932 | 21 | 5 | 12 | 4 | 0 | 2.94 | — | — | — | — | — | — | — |
| Flat Walsh | 1926–1933 | 104 | 46 | 43 | 14 | 9 | 2.40 | — | 8 | 2 | 4 | 2 | 1.68 | — |
