= Eddie Finnigan =

Canadian ice hockey player

- Born: May 23, 1913 Shawville, Quebec, Canada
- Died: July 14, 1997 (aged 84)
- Height: 5 ft 8 in (173 cm)
- Weight: 170 lb (77 kg; 12 st 2 lb)
- Position: Left wing
- Shot: Left
- Played for: St. Louis Eagles; Boston Bruins
- Playing career: 1930–1947

Edward David Finnigan (May 23, 1913 – July 14, 1997) was a Canadian ice hockey left winger. In a career that lasted from 1930 to 1947 he played 15 games over two seasons in the National Hockey League with the St. Louis Eagles and Boston Bruins between 1934 and 1936, but primarily played as an amateur. Outside of the NHL he had a distinguished career, playing in one Memorial Cup final and four Allan Cup finals. His brother, Frank, also played in the NHL.

== Playing career ==
Finnigan was born in Shawville, Quebec. He played junior hockey with the North Bay Trappers, Ottawa Shamrocks and Ottawa Rideaus from 1927 until 1931. He was a member of the Ottawa Rideaus Memorial Cup finalists team in 1929–30. He moved up to the senior Ottawa Rideaus team in 1931-32, playing in the Allan Cup finals. He played with the Rideaus through the 1933–34 season, going to the Allan Cup in 1932–33 and 1933–34. He joined the Ottawa Senators and in 1934–35 he became property of the Boston Bruins and played three games for the Bruins in 1935–36, and the bulk of the season for their CAHL affiliate Boston Cubs. He returned to Ottawa after the season and did not report to the Providence Reds the following season and was suspended. He played for the Senators in 1937–38, and after another year off due to suspension of his amateur status, played for various amateur teams until 1946–47. He made it to the Allan Cup finals again in 1940–41 with the Hull Volants of the Ottawa City Senior Hockey League.

== Career statistics ==
=== Regular season and playoffs ===
			Regular season					Playoffs
Season	Team	League	GP	G	A	Pts	PIM	GP	G	A	Pts	PIM
1927–28	North Bay Trappers	NOJHA	12	3	13	16	—	2	0	0	0	0
1928–29	Ottawa Shamrocks	OHA	7	5	3	8	6	2	1	2	3	2
1929–30	Ottawa Rideaus	OHA	12	5	1	6	19	2	1	2	3	4
1929–30	Ottawa Rideaus	Mem-Cup	—	—	—	—	—	2	2	0	2	8
1930–31	Ottawa Rideaus	OHA	15	12	4	16	49	2	0	1	1	10
1930–31	Ottawa Rideaus	OCHL	—	—	—	—	—	7	3	1	4	14
1930–31	Ottawa Rideaus	Al-Cup	—	—	—	—	—	5	1	0	1	0
1931–32	Ottawa Rideaus	OCHL	23	12	5	17	46	4	1	0	1	2
1932–33	Ottawa Rideaus	OCHL	19	9	3	12	12	6	4	1	5	4
1932–33	Ottawa Rideaus	Al-Cup	—	—	—	—	—	4	2	2	4	4
1933–34	Ottawa New Edinburghs	OCHL	20	14	7	21	28	3	1	3	4	2
1933–34	Ottawa New Edinburghs	Al-Cup	—	—	—	—	—	7	6	3	9	14
1934–35	St. Louis Eagles	NHL	12	1	1	2	2	—	—	—	—	—
1934–35	Ottawa Senators	OCHL	20	15	22	37	16	—	—	—	—	—
1935–36	Rochester Cardinals	IHL	11	2	0	2	10	—	—	—	—	—
1935–36	Boston Bruins	NHL	3	0	0	0	0	—	—	—	—	—
1935–36	Boston Cubs	Can-Am	29	9	4	13	4	—	—	—	—	—
1936–37	Providence Reds	IAHL	—	—	—	—	—	—	—	—	—	—
1937–38	Ottawa Senators	OCHL	22	10	9	19	8	4	1	1	2	0
1939–40	Ottawa RCAF Flyers	OCHL	2	2	0	2	2	—	—	—	—	—
1940–41	Hull Volants	OCHL	19	11	19	30	5	10	6	9	15	6
1941–42	Hull Volants	OCHL	12	7	13	20	0	7	5	3	8	2
1942–43	Hull-Ottawa	QSHL	18	6	10	16	0	—	—	—	—	—
1943–44	Ottawa Montagnards	OCHL	13	14	16	30	6	2	3	2	5	0
1943–44	Ottawa Canadians	OCHL	—	—	—	—	—	5	8	1	9	0
1944–45	Ottawa Commandos	OCHL	15	6	4	10	7	2	0	0	0	0
1945–46	Spencerville Sagueenens	SLSHL	—	—	—	—	—	—	—	—	—	—
1946–47	Renfrew Lions	UOVHL	23	8	7	15	4	3	0	2	2	2
NHL totals			15	1	1	2	2	—	—	—	—	—
