= Frank Jerwa =

Polish-Canadian ice hockey defenseman

- Born: 15 March 1909 Jaworzno, Russian Empire (present-day Poland)
- Died: 6 August 1992 (aged 83) Penticton, British Columbia
- Height: 6 ft 1 in (185 cm)
- Weight: 179 lb (81 kg; 12 st 11 lb)
- Position: Left wing
- Shot: Left
- Played for: PCHL; Vancouver Lions (1928-31, 1936, 1939-41); Seattle Seahawks (1937-39); NHL; Boston Bruins (1931-35); St. Louis Eagles (1935); CAHL; Boston Cubs (1931-35); New Haven Eagles (1935-36); IAHL; Springfield Indians (1936)

Frank Ludwig Jerwa (15 March 1909 – 6 August 1992) was a Polish-Canadian professional ice hockey left winger. He played for the Boston Bruins and St. Louis Eagles of the National Hockey League and the Boston Cubs and Vancouver Lions, among others, in the minors.

== Early life ==
Jerwa was born in Jaworzno, Russian Empire (now Poland) on 15 March 1909 to Frank and Anna Jerwa. He had three brothers, Joe, Art, and Steve, all of whom later played hockey, and a sister, Josephine. The family moved to Bankhead, Alberta in 1911, then to nearby Canmore in 1922. He and his brother Joe played for both the Canmore Miners junior and senior teams during the late 1920s. He played for the Miners junior team between 1927 and 1928 before moving on to the Regina Pats for the 1928–1929 season.

== Career ==
Jerwa signed with the Vancouver Lions in 1929, where he played alongside his brother Joe. Jerwa was traded to the Boston Bruins in April 1931 and again played with his brother. His debut came against the Montreal Maroons on November 14, 1931, but it wasn't until February 4, 1932, against the New York Americans, where he scored a goal and made an assist, that he earned any points. He played 65 games with the Bruins but spent most of his time in Boston with the Boston Cubs, with whom he played 101 games.

He and Gene Carrigan were both traded in January 1935 to the St. Louis Eagles, though his start was delayed due to a broken arm. He and Joe Lamb hold the title for fastest two goals in the Eagles franchise at 14:50 and 14:53 on March 12, 1935. He played 16 games before the club was disbanded; he returned to the east coast in October 1935, this time for the New Haven Eagles, a Bruins affiliate. After 45 games there, he briefly played for the Vancouver Lions, then went to the Springfield Indians for 35 games in November 1936. That year, he also played for the Can-Am All-Star team. In 1937, he signed with the Seattle Seahawks, played 88 games, and finished his career as a member of the Lions once more from November 1939 to 1941. He played 140 total career games with the Lions. He retired from professional hockey in October 1941.

== Later life ==
After leaving the professional hockey circuit, he settled in Vancouver and played in the British Columbia Hockey League with St. Regis. He died on 6 August 1992 in Penticton, British Columbia. He was survived by his wife Frances Ella, daughter Shirley, 3 grandchildren, and 3 great-grandchildren. Frances died in 2002.

== Career statistics ==
=== Regular season and playoffs ===
			Regular season					Playoffs
Season	Team	League	GP	G	A	Pts	PIM	GP	G	A	Pts	PIM
1926–27	Canmore Minors	ASHL	—	—	—	—	—	—	—	—	—	—
1927–28	Canmore Minors	AHSL	—	—	—	—	—	—	—	—	—	—
1928–29	Regina Pats	S-SJHL	5	4	2	6	4	—	—	—	—	—
1928–29	Vancouver Lions	PCHL	5	3	0	3	4	1	0	0	0	0
1929–30	Vancouver Lions	PCHL	36	10	5	15	42	4	0	0	0	2
1930–31	Vancouver Lions	PCHL	32	11	5	16	54	4	1	1	2	12
1931–32	Boston Bruins	NHL	24	4	5	9	14	—	—	—	—	—
1931–32	Boston Cubs	Can-Am	22	6	14	20	50	—	—	—	—	—
1932–33	Boston Bruins	NHL	31	3	4	7	23	—	—	—	—	—
1932–33	Boston Cubs	Can-Am	19	5	11	16	34	7	4	1	5	12
1933–34	Boston Bruins	NHL	5	0	0	0	0	—	—	—	—	—
1933–34	Boston Cubs	Can-Am	35	12	19	31	75	5	1	2	3	22
1934–35	Boston Bruins	NHL	5	0	0	0	0	—	—	—	—	—
1934–35	Boston Cubs	Can-Am	25	24	12	36	14	—	—	—	—	—
1934–35	St. Louis Eagles	NHL	16	4	7	11	14	—	—	—	—	—
1934–35	Vancouver Lions	NWHL	—	—	—	—	—	1	0	0	0	0
1935–36	New Haven Eagles	Can-Am	45	19	21	40	41	—	—	—	—	—
1936–37	Springfield Indians	IAHL	35	4	5	9	50	5	1	0	1	2
1937–38	Seattle Seahawks	PCHL	40	12	19	31	29	4	0	2	2	4
1938–39	Seattle Seahawks	PCHL	47	14	28	42	38	7	0	0	0	0
1939–40	Vancouver Lions	PCHL	22	5	8	13	36	5	2	0	2	12
1940–41	Vancouver Lions	PCHL	44	27	20	47	33	6	1	1	2	22
NHL totals			81	11	16	27	53	—	—	—	—	—
