= Pete Kelly (ice hockey) =

Canadian ice hockey player

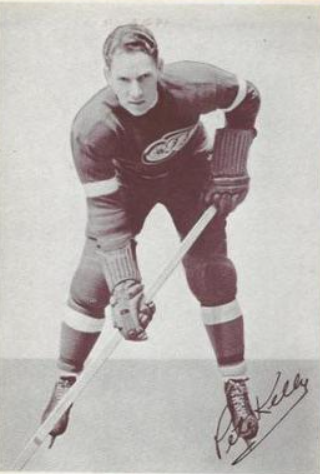
- Kelly in late 1930s photo
- Born: May 22, 1913 St. Vital, Manitoba, Canada
- Died: March 22, 2004 (aged 90) Fredericton, New Brunswick, Canada
- Height: 5 ft 11 in (180 cm)
- Weight: 170 lb (77 kg; 12 st 2 lb)
- Position: Right wing
- Shot: Right
- Played for: St. Louis Eagles; Detroit Red Wings; New York Americans; Brooklyn Americans
- Playing career: 1934–1942

Peter Cameron Kelly (May 22, 1913 – March 22, 2004) was a Canadian ice hockey right winger who played for several NHL teams.

== Career ==
Kelly played seven seasons in the National Hockey League for the St. Louis Eagles, Detroit Red Wings, New York Americans and Brooklyn Americans. He won the Stanley Cup twice in his career, with the Detroit Red Wings in 1936 and 1937. After leaving the NHL in 1942 he continue to play senior hockey for several years, finally retiring in 1952.

He was the last surviving former player of the St. Louis Eagles, a team that played just one season in the NHL (1934–35) after relocating from Ottawa.

== Later life and death ==
In his post-hockey career, Kelly directed athletics at the University of New Brunswick. He died in 2004 at the Dr. Everett Chalmers Hospital in Fredericton, at the age of 90.

== Career statistics ==
=== Regular season and playoffs ===
			Regular season					Playoffs
Season	Team	League	GP	G	A	Pts	PIM	GP	G	A	Pts	PIM
1929–30	Montreal Victorias	MCJHL	10	3	0	3	4	—	—	—	—	—
1930–31	Montreal AAA	MCJHL	10	7	0	7	10	2	1	0	1	2
1930–31	Montreal AAA	MCHL	—	—	—	—	—	1	0	0	0	0
1930–31	Montreal AAA	Mem-Cup	—	—	—	—	—	4	4	3	7	4
1931–32	Montreal AAA	MCHJL	10	8	9	17	10	2	2	0	2	6
1931–32	Montreal AC	MCHL	—	—	—	—	—	1	0	0	0	0
1931–32	Montreal AAA	Mem-Cup	—	—	—	—	—	6	5	5	10	2
1932–33	Montreal Royals	MCHL	8	0	0	0	0	6	0	2	2	11
1932–33	Montreal Royals	Al-Cup	—	—	—	—	—	6	0	2	2	11
1933–34	Charlottetown Abbies	MSHL	39	14	11	25	67	3	1	0	1	2
1934–35	St. Louis Eagles	NHL	25	3	10	13	14	—	—	—	—	—
1934–35	Charlottetown Abbies	MSHL	20	16	11	27	27	—	—	—	—	—
1935–36	Detroit Red Wings	NHL	46	6	8	14	30	7	1	1	2	2
1936–37	Detroit Red Wings	NHL	47	5	4	9	12	8	2	0	2	0
1937–38	Detroit Red Wings	NHL	9	0	1	1	2	—	—	—	—	—
1937–38	Pittsburgh Hornets	IAHL	39	7	20	27	26	2	0	2	2	0
1938–39	Detroit Red Wings	NHL	32	4	9	13	4	4	0	0	0	0
1938–39	Pittsburgh Hornets	IAHL	6	2	6	8	0	—	—	—	—	—
1939–40	Pittsburgh Hornets	IAHL	54	20	20	40	22	9	2	5	7	9
1940–41	Pittsburgh Hornets	AHL	25	4	16	20	8	—	—	—	—	—
1940–41	New York Americans	NHL	11	3	5	8	2	—	—	—	—	—
1940–41	Springfield Indians	AHL	19	6	14	20	6	3	2	1	3	0
1941–42	Brooklyn Americans	NHL	7	0	1	1	4	—	—	—	—	—
1941–42	Springfield Indians	AHL	46	33	44	77	11	5	1	6	7	4
1942–43	Moncton RCAF Flyers	NBDHL	4	9	6	15	—	4	4	8	12	12
1943–44	Moncton RCAF Flyers	NBDHL	4	4	3	7	0	—	—	—	—	—
1943–44	Charlottetown All-Stars	PEI-Sr	4	3	6	9	2	—	—	—	—	—
1943–44	Saint John Garrison	Exhib	4	6	7	13	0	2	2	1	3	0
1943–44	Saint John Beavers	Al-Cup	—	—	—	—	—	3	6	3	9	0
1944–45	Charlottetown #2	PEI-Sr	8	7	15	22	7	2	3	1	4	0
1944–45	New Glasgow Bombers	NSAPC	2	3	3	6	0	5	11	4	15	0
1944–45	New Glasgow Bombers	Al-Cup	—	—	—	—	—	3	5	5	10	0
1946–47	New Glasgow Bombers	NSAPC	16	14	14	28	—	3	2	1	3	0
1946–47	New Glasgow Bombers	Al-Cup	—	—	—	—	—	2	0	0	0	0
1947–48	University of New Brunswick	YCHL	1	0	3	3	0	4	4	6	10	2
1948–49	University of New Brunswick	YCHL	3	2	1	3	0	5	6	5	11	0
1949–50	University of New Brunswick	SNBHL	5	7	5	12	4	1	0	0	0	0
1951–52	University of New Brunswick	Exhib	1	0	3	3	0	—	—	—	—	—
IAHL/AHL totals			189	72	120	192	73	19	5	14	19	13
NHL totals			177	21	38	59	68	19	3	1	4	2

== Awards and achievements ==
- Stanley Cup Championships (1936 & 1937)
- AHL Scoring Champion (1942)
- AHL First All-Star Team (1942)
- Honoured Member of the Manitoba Hockey Hall of Fame
- Two Section One Championships (2003 & 2004)
