= Walter Kalbfleisch =

- Born: December 18, 1911; New Hamburg, Ontario, Canada
- Died: May 16, 1960 (aged 48); Niagara Falls, Ontario, Canada
- Height: 5 ft 10 in (178 cm)
- Weight: 170 lb (77 kg; 12 st 2 lb)
- Position: Defence
- Shot: Right
- Played for: New York Americans; St. Louis Eagles; Ottawa Senators
- Playing career: 1933–1943

Walter Morris "Jeff, Jake" Kalbfleisch (December 18, 1911 – May 16, 1960) was a Canadian ice hockey player. Kalbfleisch played 36 games over four seasons in the National Hockey League for the Ottawa Senators, St. Louis Eagles, New York Americans and Boston Bruins from 1933 to 1937. The rest of his career, which lasted from 1933 to 1943, was spent in various minor leagues

== Playing career ==
Jeff Kalbfleisch came to Niagara Falls, Ontario in 1928 to play junior hockey and was a member of several great local junior and senior amateur teams. After successful years in the junior ranks which included winning an S.P.A. title and competing in the Ontario Hockey Association junior finals, Kalbfleisch became an outstanding defenceman for the 1932-1933 Niagara Falls Cataracts senior squad which annexed the Ontario Hockey Association Senior Championship and advanced to the Eastern Canadian finals in Allan Cup play. NHL scouts were impressed with his efforts in the senior confrontations and the following season Kalbfleisch jumped directly from amateur ranks to the National Hockey League with the Ottawa Senators. He later played for the New York Americans and St. Louis Eagles in the NHL and completed his career with Hershey and Springfield of the AHL. FoIIowing his hockey career Jeff returned to Niagara Falls and transferred his considerable athletic talents to amateur baseball. A good out- fielder, excellent base runner and power hitter, Kalbfleisch played for the 1940 and 1941 Brights and 1946 Houck Senior OBA Champions and served as player-coach for the Niagara Falls Fords Seniors in the late 1940s. Jeff Kalbfleisch was also actively involved in the community and as a member of the Niagara Falls Lions Club he assisted with the development of the Lions Club Learn-to-Swim Program at the Municipal Pool.

A steady defender in his own end, blueliner Walter Kalbfleish played in four cities during his brief NHL career in the 1930s. He was a part of history because he played on three defunct teams—the original Ottawa Senators, the St. Louis Eagles, and the New York Americans. Born in New Hamburg, Ontario, the man known as "Jake" played two years each with the Niagara Falls Cataracts junior and senior clubs. He was signed as a free agent with the Ottawa Senators and played 22 games in 1933-34. The next season, he suited up three times for the franchise when it relocated to St. Louis, Missouri.

Following the demise of the Senators/Eagles franchise, Kalbfeish was picked by the New York Americans in the dispersal draft in October 1936. He played four games for the Americans in 1935-36 but spent most of his time with the Rochester Cardinals of the IAHL and the CanAm league's Providence Reds. Kalbfleish's last few NHL games were spent with the Americans and Boston before playing three and a half years in the AHL. In the early 40s he suited up for three Niagara Falls-based senior clubs—the Brights, Weavers, and Cataracts.

== Personal life ==
Jeff was survived by his wife Violet (1970), Daughter Marlene (2002) and Daughter Diane. Also by his four grandchildren David, Jeff, Lu Ann Reilly and Robert Jolley Jr.

== Career statistics ==
=== Regular season and playoffs ===
			Regular season					Playoffs
Season	Team	League	GP	G	A	Pts	PIM	GP	G	A	Pts	PIM
1929–30	Niagara Falls Catracts	OHA Jr	6	1	1	2	16	2	1	0	1	2
1929–30	Niagara Falls Cataracts	Mem-Cup	—	—	—	—	—	6	1	3	4	8
1930–31	Niagara Falls Cataracts	OHA Jr	7	2	3	5	6	2	1	1	2	0
1931–32	Niagara Falls Cataracts	OHA Jr	20	0	1	1	54	2	0	0	0	2
1932–33	Niagara Falls Cataracts	OHA Jr	22	3	1	4	56	5	0	0	0	6
1932–33	Niagara Falls Cataracts	Al-Cup	—	—	—	—	—	6	1	1	2	18
1933–34	Ottawa Senators	NHL	22	0	4	4	20	—	—	—	—	—
1934–35	St. Louis Eagles	NHL	3	0	0	0	6	—	—	—	—	—
1934–35	Buffalo Bisons	IHL	28	3	3	6	30	—	—	—	—	—
1935–36	New York Americans	NHL	4	0	0	0	2	5	0	0	0	2
1935–36	Rochester Cardinals	IHL	21	3	2	5	14	—	—	—	—	—
1935–36	Providence Reds	Can-Am	21	2	2	4	30	—	—	—	—	—
1936–37	New York Americans	NHL	6	0	0	0	4	—	—	—	—	—
1936–37	New Haven Eagles	IAHL	12	0	0	0	12	—	—	—	—	—
1936–37	Boston Bruins	NHL	1	0	0	0	0	—	—	—	—	—
1936–37	Providence Reds	IAHL	24	3	1	4	28	3	0	0	0	0
1937–38	Providence Reds	IHAL	48	1	9	10	46	7	0	0	0	3
1938–39	Hershey Bears	IAHL	45	4	4	8	42	—	—	—	—	—
1939–40	Hershey Bears	IAHL	53	3	4	7	72	6	0	1	1	4
1940–41	Niagara Falls Brights	OHA Sr	4	0	0	0	4	3	0	0	0	4
1941–42	Niagara Falls Weavers	OHA Sr	27	2	3	5	34	7	0	0	0	8
1942–43	Niagara Falls Cataracts	OHA Sr	5	0	2	2	6	1	0	0	0	0
IAHL totals			182	11	18	29	200	16	0	1	1	6
NHL totals			36	0	4	4	32	5	0	0	0	2

== Transactions ==
- Signed as a free agent by Ottawa, May 10, 1933.
- Transferred to St. Louis after Ottawa franchise relocated, September 22, 1934.
- Claimed by NY Americans from St. Louis in Dispersal Draft, October 15, 1935.
- Traded to Boston by NY Americans for Teddy Graham, December 19, 1936.

== Awards and honours ==
- IAHL Second All-Star Team (1938)
- IAHL First All-Star Team (1939, 1940)
