= Ottawa Senators (original) records =

This is a listing of records for the original Ottawa Senators (1883–1955). The Senators existed for a number of years before and after their membership in the National Hockey League. This list focuses on the NHL years (1917–34).

== Team Records ==
- Lowest goals-against-average, one season: 1.17, 1925–26 (42 goals in 36 games)
- Fewest home losses, one season: 0, 1922–23 (NHL record)
- Fewest road losses, one season: 4, 1919–20 (12 games played)
- Highest percentage win record, one season: 0.792, 1919-20 (19–5)
- First place finishes: 1918–19, 1919–20, 1921–22, 1922–23, 1923–24, 1925–26, 1926–27
- Regular season record: 258 wins, 221 losses, 63 ties.

== Individual Records ==
- Longest shutout sequence by a goaltender: 461 minutes, 29 seconds, Alec Connell, 1927–28 (NHL record)
- Most shutouts, one season: 15(2x) Alex Connell (1925–26, 1927–28)
- Highest goal-scoring percentage, career: Cy Denneny, .767
- First winner of Hart Trophy (Most Valuable Player): Frank Nighbor, 1923–24
- First winner of Lady Byng Trophy (Sportsmanship & high level of play): Frank Nighbor, 1924–25
- First winner of Lester Patrick Trophy: Jack Adams, former player in 1926–27
