= Ottawa Senators (senior hockey) =

- City: Ottawa, Ontario, Canada
- Founded: 1934
- Home arena: Ottawa Auditorium
- Colors: black, red & white
- Owners: Ottawa Auditorium, Tommy Gorman

Championships
- Playoff championships: Allan Cup: 1943 and 1949

The Ottawa Senators, also known as the Ottawa Commandos and Senior Senators, was an amateur, later semi-professional, senior-level men's ice hockey team based in Ottawa, Ontario, Canada. In 1934, the Ottawa Auditorium, owners of the Ottawa Hockey Association decided it could no longer operate the Senators of the National Hockey League in Ottawa due to mounting financial losses. The Association split its hockey operations, relocating the NHL franchise to St. Louis, and continuing the Senators as an amateur club. The club operated from 1934 until 1955, winning the Allan Cup Canadian men's senior ice hockey championship in 1943 and 1949. During the war years from 1942 until 1944, it operated as the Ottawa Commandos.

== Club history ==
In April 1934, after two seasons of losses, the directors of the Ottawa Auditorium, owners of the Ottawa Hockey Association, owners of the Ottawa NHL franchise, decided to relocate the NHL franchise to St. Louis, Missouri. At the same time, it was decided to continue the Senators as a senior men's amateur team in the Montreal Group of the Quebec Amateur Hockey Association (QAHA). Ottawa, being in a separate hockey grouping than Quebec, had to get the sanction of the Canadian Amateur Hockey Association to join the QAHA. The application to join the QAHA was made by the manager of the Auditorium, Clare Brunton. The 'Senior Senators' took over the 'barber-pole' striped sweaters with the 'O' logo, and played in the same home arena, the Auditorium, but in an amateur league. After 1935, the NHL franchise was bought out and only the senior team was left to continue.

For the players, the team functioned as both a stepping stone to the NHL, and a place for former NHL players to play after leaving the NHL. In the 1934-35 season, Eddie Finnigan, Frank's brother, played for both the senior Senators and the St. Louis Eagles and returned to the Senators after his NHL days were over. Former NHL Senators Ray Kinsella and Syd Howe would return to Ottawa and play for the Senior Senators. Howard Riopelle, after a few years with the Canadiens, joined the Senators in 1951 and would mix working for his local business with playing for the Senators.

During the World War II years, the team operated as the Ottawa Commandos. During this time, NHL players who had enlisted in the Canadian armed forces, continued to play hockey in senior leagues. The Commandos had players such as goaltender Jim Henry of the New York Rangers, whose military posting was in Ottawa.

During its history the club's owners included James MacCaffrey, who was also its first manager, and who owned the football Ottawa Rough Riders and Tommy Gorman, who had had a partial ownership of the Senators previously from 1917 until 1925, and had gone on to be an NHL executive with the Chicago Black Hawks, New York Americans, Montreal Maroons and Montreal Canadiens. The team's first coach was Wes Richards and later coaches included Georges Boucher, Bill Durnan and Alex Smith.

=== 1934–41: QAHA play ===
The Senators joined the 'Montreal Group' and played against six teams from the Montreal area: McGill, "Jr." Canadiens, Lafontaine, Royals, Verdun and Victorias. McGill and Victorias did not play on Sundays and played only half the schedule, points in their games counting for double. The Senators made their QAHA debut on November 10, 1934 at home against the Victorias. After the season, the play off format was for the first-place team to play the fourth-place team, and the second-place play the third. The other teams did not qualify.

1934–35

Ottawa played an 18-game schedule from November 10, 1934 through February 10, 1935. Training camp began on October 17 with open tryouts at the Auditorium in conjunction with the Eagles' training camp. The team would place third in the seven-team group, and played McGill in the semi-finals. The Senators would defeat McGill to advance to the finals against the Montreal Royals. Ottawa would lose the best-of-five 1–3-1. The club averaged 4,000 fans per game for ten season games, with crowds of 7,000 and 8,000 for play-off games.

1935–36

The Senators made a coaching change for 1935-36. Dr. Wes Patrick was replaced by Vic Wagner. The team made the playoffs but lost the best-of-five to Montreal 3-1.

1936–37

Wes Patrick returned to coach the Senators. The Lafontaine team was replaced by the Quebec Aces. Ray Kinsella returned from the pro ranks to play for the Senators. The Senators placed fifth and did not qualify for the playoffs.

1937–38

Canadiens were replaced by the Montreal Concordia Civics. Eddie Finnigan and Bill Touhey returned from the pros to play for the Senators. Ottawa placed third and met second-place Quebec in the playoffs. Quebec won the best-of-three series 3-2, all games won by the home team.

1938–39

Ottawa placed second and took on Concordia in the semi-finals, defeating them 4-3, 2-2, 3-1 (2-1) to advance to the finals. In the finals against the Montreal Royals, Ottawa lost three straight ( 2-3, 1-2(OT), 1-5) to lose the series.

1939–40

Former Ottawa Citizen sports editor Tommy Shields took over as coach this season. His first season as coach was unsuccessful as Ottawa finished out of the playoffs, placing fifth in the group. The Cornwall Flyers were added to the group, which lost the Victorias and McGill clubs in the group, operating only six teams. The Victorias club had operated since 1881.

1940–41

The team bounced back this season to finish first in the group with new coach Gene Chouinard. The Canadiens returned to the group to increase it to a seven team league. Ottawa faced the Cornwall Flyers in the semi-finals, and defeated them in a best-of-five 3-0-1 ( 5-0, 5-5, 1-0 and 3-2 ) to advance to the finals. The Senators faced the Royals again in the finals and lost their best-of-five 1-3 (6-2, 2-8, 5-11, 0-2).

=== 1941–1954: Quebec Senior Hockey League ===
In 1941, the QAHA re-organized and put all of its senior teams in one league, the Quebec Senior Hockey League (QSHL), including the Senators.

In 1942–43, the club was known as the Commandos and it won the league championship and the Allan Cup.

In 1943–44, former NHL Senator Bill Beveridge played for the club. The club could not defend its championship. The Commandos lost in the first round of the playoffs (6–3, 1–5, 3–13) to the Montreal Royals.

In 1947, the club was bought by Tommy Gorman, who had returned to Ottawa and was promoting sports including boxing and horse racing in the capital. The club won the league championship three straight times from 1947–1949, and the 1949 club won the Allan Cup championship, led by Larry Regan, who would later coach the Los Angeles Kings. In 1950, the league was classified as "major" and was no longer eligible for the Allan Cup.

In 1953, the league was renamed the Quebec Hockey League (QHL) and became professional.

The team ceased operations on December 20, 1954 in the middle of the 1954–55 QHL season. Owner Gorman blamed television for a drop in attendance, as televised games of the Toronto Maple Leafs had started in the previous season in Ottawa and Canadiens telecasts were available within 20 miles of Ottawa.

=== Aftermath ===
In 1956–57, the void in Ottawa hockey would be filled by the Hull-Ottawa Canadiens, a junior farm team of the Montreal Canadiens. A senior version of the team would play in 1957–58 and 1958–59 in the OHA.

After the Quebec Hockey League folded in 1959, a new Eastern Professional Hockey League would be formed which included a new version of the Hull-Ottawa Canadiens. It lasted until 1963.

The Ottawa 67's junior ice hockey team was founded in 1967 to play in the new Ottawa Civic Centre, which replaced the Auditorium, which was torn down soon after. The 67's continue today in the same arena.

During the 1970s, Ottawa had two World Hockey Association teams. The first was the Ottawa Nationals which played in the WHA's 1972–73 inaugural season before relocating to Toronto. In 1976, the Denver Spurs finished the season as the Ottawa Civics, but it folded after the season's end.

T. P. Gorman's son, Joe Gorman, would eventually participate in the 1989–1990 campaign to bring the NHL back to Ottawa and gave his permission to use the Senators name. Their efforts were successful and the Ottawa Senators still play in the Ottawa metro area.

== Season statistics ==
Year	League	GP	W	L	T	PTS	GF	GA	PIM	Finish	Playoffs
1934–35	QAHA-MSG	18	10	6	4	24	-	-	-	3rd	Defeated McGill in semi-final lost to Montreal Royals in final (1–3–1)
1935–36	QAHA-MSG	24	12	12	0	24	89	84	--	4th	Lost to Montreal Royals in semi-final
1936–37	QAHA-MSG	24	9	14	1	19	95	90	--	5th	--
1937–38	QSHL	22	9	9	4	22	81	79	--	3rd	Lost to Quebec Aces in semi-final
1938–39	QSHL	22	14	5	3	33	105	65	--	2nd	Defeated Concordia in semi-final; lost to Royals in final
1939–40	QSHL	30	12	15	3	27	116	131	--	5th	--
1940–41	QSHL	36	24	7	5	53	162	86	--	1st	Defeated Cornwall in semi-final; lost to Royals in final
1941–42	QSHL	40	23	14	3	49	154	111	--	1st	Defeated Canadiens in semi-final; lost to Quebec Aces in final
1942–43	QSHL	34	14	15	5	33	142	130	--	4th	Defeated Cornwall Army in semi-final Defeated Montreal RCAF in final Defeated Toronto RCAF Flyers in Eastern semi-final Defeated Ottawa RCAF Flyers in Eastern final Defeated Victoria Army - Allan Cup Champions
1943–44	QSHL	18	6	10	2	14	71	90	--	3rd	Lost to Montreal Royals in semi-final
1944–45	QSHL	24	7	15	2	16	109	148	--	3rd	Lost to Quebec Aces in semi-final
1945–46	QSHL	40	24	14	2	50	211	158	-	2nd	Defeated Shawinigan Falls in semi-final Lost to Montreal Royals in final
1946–47	QSHL	40	26	10	4	56	206	148	-	1st	Defeated Shawinigan Falls in semi-final Lost to Montreal Royals in final
1947–48	QSHL	48	35	11	2	72	271	139	-	1st	Defeated Shawinigan Falls in semi-final Defeated Quebec Aces in final Defeated Victoriaville Tigres in Quebec final Defeated Hamilton Tigers in Eastern final Lost to Edmonton Flyers in Allan Cup final
1948–49	QSHL	60	44	15	1	89	341	207	-	1st	Defeated Valleyfield Braves in semi-final Defeated Sherbrooke St-Francois in final Defeated St-Joseph D'Alma Aigles in Quebec final Defeated Toronto Marlboros in Eastern final Defeated Regina Capitals - Allan Cup Champions
1949–50	QSHL	60	31	25	4	66	251	240	-	3rd	Defeated Chicoutimi Sagueneens in quarter-final Lost to Quebec Aces in semi-final
1950–51	QSHL	60	29	23	8	66	214	189	-	3rd	Defeated Sherbrooke Saints in quarter-final Lost to Quebec Aces in semi-final
1951–52	QSHL	60	26	28	6	58	177	195	655	4th	Lost to Quebec Aces in semi-final
1952–53	QSHL	60	27	26	7	61	171	191	-	4th	Lost to Chicoutimi Sagueneens in semi-final
1953–54	QHL	72	34	32	6	74	223	212	-	3rd	Defeated Valleyfield Braves in semi-final Lost to Quebec Aces in final
1954–55	QHL	27	10	17	0	20	63	90	-	disbanded	--

- Sources: 1934–1941: Ottawa Citizen
- 1942–43: Ottawa Citizen
- 1943–44: Ottawa Citizen

== See also ==
- Allan Cup
- Ice hockey in Ottawa
- Ottawa Senators (original)
