= Ray Kinsella =

Canadian ice hockey player (1911–1996)

- Born: January 27, 1911 Ottawa, Ontario, Canada
- Died: April 29, 1996 (aged 85)
- Height: 5 ft 10 in (178 cm)
- Weight: 162 lb (73 kg; 11 st 8 lb)
- Position: Defence
- Shot: Left
- Played for: Ottawa Senators
- Playing career: 1928–1938

Raymond Thomas Kinsella (January 27, 1911 – April 29, 1996) was a Canadian professional ice hockey defenceman who played 14 games in the National Hockey League with the Ottawa Senators during the 1930–31 season. The rest of his career, which lasted from 1928 to 1938, was spent in various minor leagues. He was born in Ottawa, Ontario, Canada.

== Playing career ==
Kinsella was playing in the Ottawa City Senior Hockey League when the Senators signed him as a free agent in 1931. Kinsella played the rest of the 1930–31 season for the Ottawa Senators. It was his only year in the NHL. Starting in the following season, he played three seasons in the Can-Am Hockey League, finishing his professional career with the AHA Tulsa Oilers in 1934–35. When the Ottawa Senators NHL franchise moved to St. Louis, the owners set up the Ottawa Senators senior men's amateur team. After his professional career ended, Kinsella returned to Ottawa and played for the senior Senators.

== After hockey ==
Kinsella, one of three surviving Ottawa Senators in 1992, was part of the opening night ceremonies in 1992 for the current Ottawa Senators. Ray's brothers Gerry and Ollie Kinsella also played ice hockey.

== Career statistics ==
=== Regular season and playoffs ===
			Regular season					Playoffs
Season	Team	League	GP	G	A	Pts	PIM	GP	G	A	Pts	PIM
1928–29	Ottawa Post Office	OCHL	—	—	—	—	—	—	—	—	—	—
1928–29	Ottawa CPR Bluebirds	OCHL	—	—	—	—	—	—	—	—	—	—
1929–30	Ottawa Shamrocks	OCHL	15	0	1	1	10	4	0	0	0	0
1929–30	Ottawa Shamrocks	Al-Cup	—	—	—	—	—	2	2	0	2	0
1930–31	Ottawa Senators	NHL	14	0	0	0	0	—	—	—	—	—
1930–31	Ottawa Rideaus	OCHL	18	3	4	7	34	—	—	—	—	—
1931–32	Philadelphia Arrows	Can-Am	31	8	3	11	12	—	—	—	—	—
1932–33	New Haven Eagles	Can-Am	19	4	4	8	16	—	—	—	—	—
1932–33	Quebec Castors	Can-Am	13	1	1	2	6	—	—	—	—	—
1933–34	New Haven Eagles	Can-Am	40	6	15	21	15	—	—	—	—	—
1934–35	London Tecumsehs	IHL	7	0	2	2	5	—	—	—	—	—
1934–35	Tulsa Oilers	AHA	43	11	16	27	27	5	0	0	0	0
1936–37	Ottawa Senators	OCHL	19	7	7	14	7	—	—	—	—	—
1937–38	Ottawa Montagnards	OCHL	17	2	9	11	12	—	—	—	—	—
Can-Am totals			103	19	23	42	49	—	—	—	—	—
NHL totals			14	0	0	0	0	—	—	—	—	—
