= George Patterson (ice hockey) =

Canadian ice hockey player (1906–1977)

- Born: May 22, 1906 Kingston, Ontario, Canada
- Died: January 20, 1977 (aged 70)
- Height: 6 ft 1 in (185 cm)
- Weight: 176 lb (80 kg; 12 st 8 lb)
- Position: Right wing
- Shot: Right
- Played for: Toronto St. Pats; Toronto Maple Leafs; Montreal Canadiens; New York Americans; Boston Bruins; Detroit Red Wings; St. Louis Eagles
- Playing career: 1926–1945

George Franklin "Paddy" Patterson (May 22, 1906 – January 20, 1977) was a professional ice hockey winger who played nine seasons in the National Hockey League (NHL). He was born in Kingston, Ontario.

As an NHL rookie, George scored the first goal for the newly named Toronto Maple Leafs in 1926–27. He was also a member of the following teams: the Montreal Canadiens, New York Americans, Boston Bruins, Detroit Red Wings, and St. Louis Eagles.

Patterson later coached senior ice hockey in Kingston. In 1951, Ontario Hockey Association executives Jack Roxburgh, George Dudley, Frank Buckland and W. A. Hewitt, handed out a lifetime suspension to Patterson, for conspiring to deliberately lose a playoff series to avoid moving into a higher-level of playoffs, rather than staying in a lower level and potentially make more profits at home playoff games than on the road.

== Career statistics ==
			Regular season					Playoffs
Season	Team	League	GP	G	A	Pts	PIM	GP	G	A	Pts	PIM
1925–26	Kitchener Greenshirts	OHA	—	—	—	—	—	—	—	—	—	—
1926–27	Hamilton Tigers	Can-Pro	23	14	3	17	30	—	—	—	—	—
1926–27	Toronto St. Pats/Maple Leafs	NHL	17	4	2	6	17	—	—	—	—	—
1927–28	Toronto Maple Leafs	NHL	12	1	0	1	14	—	—	—	—	—
1927–28	Toronto Ravinas	Can-Pro	16	7	0	7	37	—	—	—	—	—
1927–28	Montreal Canadiens	NHL	16	0	1	1	0	—	—	—	—	—
1928–29	Montreal Canadiens	NHL	44	4	5	9	34	3	0	0	0	2
1929–30	New York Americans	NHL	39	13	4	17	24	—	—	—	—	—
1930–31	New York Americans	NHL	44	8	6	14	67	—	—	—	—	—
1931–32	New York Americans	NHL	20	6	0	6	26	—	—	—	—	—
1931–32	New Haven Eagles	Can-Am	25	17	10	27	33	2	2	0	2	12
1932–33	New York Americans	NHL	41	12	7	19	26	—	—	—	—	—
1933–34	New York Americans	NHL	13	3	0	3	6	—	—	—	—	—
1933–34	Boston Bruins	NHL	10	1	1	1	2	—	—	—	—	—
1933–34	Boston Cubs	Can-Am	17	7	3	10	15	5	0	2	2	2
1934–35	Detroit Red Wings	NHL	7	0	0	0	0	—	—	—	—	—
1934–35	Detroit Olympics	IHL	3	0	0	0	2	—	—	—	—	—
1934–35	St. Louis Eagles	NHL	21	0	1	1	2	—	—	—	—	—
1934–35	Buffalo Bisons	IHL	25	10	9	19	56	—	—	—	—	—
1935–36	Buffalo Bisons	IHL	48	7	11	18	31	1	0	0	0	2
1936–37	Buffalo Bisons	IAHL	11	2	1	3	16	—	—	—	—	—
1936–37	Minneapolis Millers	AHA	35	19	17	36	35	6	8	2	10	6
1937–38	Minneapolis Millers	AHA	48	25	34	59	46	7	1	4	5	0
1938–39	Cleveland Barons	IAHL	53	11	5	16	20	9	1	1	2	0
1939–40	New Haven Eagles	IAHL	54	25	27	52	42	3	2	2	4	2
1940–41	New Haven Eagles	AHL	45	19	33	52	33	2	0	0	0	0
1941–42	New Haven Eagles	AHL	28	9	16	25	18	2	0	1	1	2
1942–43	New Haven Eagles	AHL	26	10	12	22	2	—	—	—	—	—
1942–43	Indianapolis Capitals	AHL	23	9	19	28	6	7	1	4	5	0
1943–44	Hershey Bears	AHL	48	15	31	46	16	7	1	1	2	4
1944–45	Hershey Bears	AHL	24	9	13	22	5	—	—	—	—	—
1944–45	Providence Reds	AHL	30	17	20	37	4	—	—	—	—	—
AHL totals			342	126	177	303	162	30	5	9	14	8
NHL totals			284	51	27	78	218	3	0	0	0	2
