= Archie Wilcox =

Canadian ice hockey player

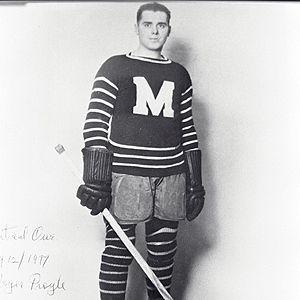
- Born: May 5, 1903; Montreal, Quebec, Canada
- Died: August 27, 1993 (aged 90); Brockville, Ontario, Canada
- Height: 5 ft 11 in (180 cm)
- Weight: 190 lb (86 kg; 13 st 8 lb)
- Position: Defence
- Shot: Left
- Played for: Montreal Maroons; Boston Bruins; St. Louis Eagles
- Playing career: 1927–1935

Archibald Thomas Bartlett Wilcox (May 5, 1903 – August 27, 1993) was a Canadian ice hockey defenceman who played 7 seasons in the National Hockey League for the Montreal Maroons, Boston Bruins and St. Louis Eagles between 1929 and 1935. He also played several years in the minor leagues, primarily in the Canadian–American Hockey League, in a career that lasted from 1926 to 1935.

Both former NHL players, Archie Wilcox and Hazen McAndrew, who played for the Brooklyn Americans, died on the same day.

== Career statistics ==
=== Regular season and playoffs ===
			Regular season					Playoffs
Season	Team	League	GP	G	A	Pts	PIM	GP	G	A	Pts	PIM
1924–25	Montreal St. Ann's	ECHL	—	—	—	—	—	—	—	—	—	—
1925–26	Montreal CNR	MRTHL	9	3	3	6	12	1	0	0	0	0
1925–26	Montreal Victorias	MCHL	10	0	0	0	14	3	0	0	0	2
1926–27	Stratford Nationals	Can-Pro	6	0	0	0	6	—	—	—	—	—
1926–27	Providence Reds	Can-Am	21	4	3	7	22	—	—	—	—	—
1927–28	Providence Reds	Can-Am	38	12	2	14	50	—	—	—	—	—
1928–29	Providence Reds	Can-Am	40	2	1	3	52	6	0	2	2	14
1929–30	Montreal Maroons	NHL	42	3	5	8	38	4	1	0	1	2
1930–31	Montreal Maroons	NHL	39	2	2	4	42	2	0	0	0	2
1931–32	Montreal Maroons	NHL	48	3	3	6	37	4	0	0	0	4
1932–33	Montreal Maroons	NHL	47	0	3	3	37	2	0	0	0	0
1933–34	Montreal Maroons	NHL	10	0	0	0	2	—	—	—	—	—
1933–34	Quebec Castors	Can-Am	15	1	2	3	13	—	—	—	—	—
1933–34	Boston Bruins	NHL	14	0	1	1	2	—	—	—	—	—
1934–35	Boston Cubs	Can-Am	4	0	2	2	6	—	—	—	—	—
1934–35	St. Louis Eagles	NHL	8	0	0	0	0	—	—	—	—	—
1934–35	Syracuse Stars	IHL	15	0	5	5	8	2	0	0	0	0
NHL totals			208	8	14	22	158	12	1	0	1	8
