= Alec Connell =

Canadian ice hockey player (1900–1958)

- Hockey Hall of Fame, 1958
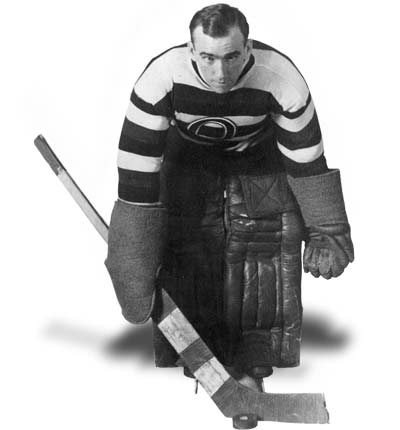
- Born: February 8, 1900 Ottawa, Ontario, Canada
- Died: May 10, 1958 (aged 58) Ottawa, Ontario, Canada
- Height: 5 ft 9 in (175 cm)
- Weight: 150 lb (68 kg; 10 st 10 lb)
- Position: Goaltender
- Caught: left
- Played for: Ottawa Senators; Detroit Falcons; New York Americans; Montreal Maroons
- Playing career: 1924–1937

Alexander Connell (February 8, 1900 (Note: Some sources claim 1902 for Connell's birthdate, but his birth registration, 1901 Canadian census entry and gravestone list 1900.) – May 10, 1958), nicknamed "The Ottawa Fireman", was a Canadian professional ice hockey goaltender who played for the Ottawa Senators, Detroit Falcons, New York Americans and Montreal Maroons teams in the National Hockey League. He is widely believed to be one of the greatest hockey goaltenders of all time.

== Amateur career ==
While in the military in the First World War and stationed in Kingston, Ontario, Connell was recruited to play for the junior league Kingston Frontenacs in 1917. Purportedly then unable to skate, he consequently played two seasons as the backup goaltender for the team.

Other than hockey, Connell starred in several sports. He was a catcher in the Interprovincial League, played lacrosse for the Ottawa team that won the Canadian championship in the 1920s, and played hockey with St. Brigid's of the senior-level Ottawa City Hockey League.

By then an accomplished goaltender, Connell played five seasons in the OCHL, principally for the St. Brigid's hockey team, upon being recruited by future Senator and Hall of Famer King Clancy.

== NHL career ==
=== 1920s ===
1924-25 Champ's Cigarettes (C144) card of Connell

Connell joined the Ottawa Senators for the 1924–25 season after the Senators dealt aging star goaltender Clint Benedict to the expansion Maroons. He had an immediate impact with the Senators, guiding them to a third-place finish with a league-leading seven shutouts in 30 games, breaking the NHL record. During that season, Connell was involved in the first 0–0 tie in NHL history, on December 14 against the Hamilton Tigers, with Jake Forbes as the opposing goalie.

The 1926 season saw Connell's definite ascension to stardom, as he more than doubled his NHL record total of shutouts to 15, and set a new mark for the lowest goals-against average in league history with 1.12.

In 1927 he was the first goalie to record a 30–win season. In the playoffs, Connell allowed only four goals in six games, as the Senators beat the Boston Bruins in the finals. It was the Senators' eleventh and final Stanley Cup championship.

In the 1927–28 season he set the NHL record—unbroken as of 2022—for the longest shutout streak at 461:29, by recording seven consecutive shutouts and another 41 minutes in the eighth game, from January 31 to February 22, 1928. During the Stanley Cup Final that season between the Montreal Maroons and the New York Rangers—at which Connell was a spectator—Rangers' goalie Lorne Chabot was injured, and New York coach Lester Patrick petitioned for Connell to take his place. The Montreal coach refused, and Patrick took the net himself for one of the most famous incidents in league history.

=== 1930s ===
As a small-market team and badly affected by the Great Depression, the Ottawa team fell into decline thereafter, and while the team was on hiatus for the 1932 season, Connell played for the Detroit Falcons under loan. An unusual incident took place during the season in a game against the New York Americans, owned by notorious bootlegger "Big Bill" Dwyer. After a disputed call, Connell clashed with a goal judge who was reputed to be a hit man for Dwyer's mob, and required police protection after the game to leave the arena.

He returned to the Senators for 1932–33 season, and was named team captain. However, he was injured in a game on December 6, 1932, against the Chicago Black Hawks, and only played sporadically thereafter, spelled by Bill Beveridge. He was pulled from a December 26 game against the Rangers after allowing four goals, and was incensed enough to announce his retirement, reportedly telling coach Cy Denneny, "Your move was the height of stupidity."

After fully recovering from his injuries in January 1934, the Montreal Maroons reportedly were interested in acquiring Connell's rights, but only on a loan basis. The financially-strapped Senators demanded a straight cash deal only, and rejected the Maroons' offer.

Connell was injured for most of the 1934 season and replaced in net for the Senators by Beveridge. On March 15, 1934, the Senators were playing the New York Americans, when Roy Worters, the Amerks' goaltender, was injured in the first period and could not continue. Ottawa loaned Connell, who was available, to New York for the remainder of the game, and he led the Amerks to a 3–2 win, being named the star of the game. Ironically, it was the last home game in the Senators' forty-year history, as the team would be relocated to St. Louis the following year.

Connell's rights being traded by the Senators for Glenn Brydson, he returned out of semi-retirement to play for the Montreal Maroons in 1935, at the behest of new Maroons' coach Tommy Gorman, who had won the Cup with Chicago the previous season. Then 33 years old, he rebounded to his old form, leading the NHL in shutouts for the fourth time and finishing second behind Chicago's Lorne Chabot for the Vezina Trophy as leading goaltender. During that season, Connell allowed the first penalty shot goal in league history—it was newly instituted in that season—to Ralph Bowman of St. Louis on November 13.

Connell went undefeated in the 1935 playoffs for the Maroons to lead them to the Stanley Cup, allowing only four goals in the Cup Final. Gorman called his play the "greatest goalkeeping performance in the history of hockey."

As he was unable to gain a leave of absence from his job as Secretary of the Ottawa Fire Department—throughout his playing career, Connell held offseason administrative positions for the Ottawa Fire Department (Note: It is erroneously reported in a number of sources that Connell was a firefighter.)—he retired again, but returned for the 1936–37 NHL season with the Maroons, to platoon with Beveridge. Fading in form, he played his last game on January 16, 1937.

== Awards and achievements ==
At the time of his retirement, Connell was second in NHL career shutouts, and nearly ninety years later, is still in sixth place, with 81. He is the only goaltender in league history to record 15 or more shutouts in two separate seasons.

Connell's 1.91 career goals against average (GAA) is the lowest for any goaltender in the history of the National Hockey League, a record he has held for over ninety years. He is also the career leader for playoff goals-against average for goalies playing over twenty games.

Connell was also one of the first goaltenders to transition in 1927 from the cricket-style pads of the early days of hockey to the wider modern-style leather-and-kapok pads, pioneered by Hamilton harnessmaker Pop Kenesky.

He was inducted into the Hockey Hall of Fame in 1958, but died before his formal induction after a lengthy illness on May 10, 1958. Upon his death, former teammate King Clancy said, "To me, Alec was a grand competitor, a great fellow and a great friend -- one of the outstanding goalies of his time."

The Society for International Hockey Research, in compiling a "retroactive" Conn Smythe Trophy (most valuable player in the playoffs) list, deemed that Connell would have won in 1927 had the trophy been awarded back then. Charles Coleman, in Trail of the Stanley Cup, believed that Connell would have won the Vezina Trophy in 1926, in like fashion.

== Career statistics ==
=== Regular season and playoffs ===
			Regular season								Playoffs
Season	Team	League	GP	W	L	T	MIN	GA	SO	GAA	GP	W	L	T	MIN	GA	SO	GAA
1917–18	Kingston Frontenacs	OHA-Jr.	4	4	0	0	240	11	0	2.75	4	3	1	0	240	18	0	4.50
1918–19	Kingston Frontenacs	OHA-Jr.	5	3	2	0	305	24	0	4.72	4	0	1	3	240	20	0	5.00
1919–20	Ottawa Cliffsides	OCHL	7	4	3	0	430	8	2	1.12	—	—	—	—	—	—	—	—
1920–21	Ottawa St. Brigid's	OCHL	11	8	2	1	660	12	2	1.09	8	6	1	1	520	14	1	1.62
1921–22	Ottawa Gunners	OCHL	14	10	3	1	860	18	5	1.26	6	5	1	0	360	17	0	2.83
1922–23	Ottawa St. Brigid's	OCHL	17	8	8	1	1090	26	4	1.43	—	—	—	—	—	—	—	—
1923–24	Ottawa St. Brigid's	OCHL	12	8	4	0	740	14	5	1.14	—	—	—	—	—	—	—	—
1924–25	Ottawa Senators	NHL	30	17	12	1	1852	66	7	2.14	—	—	—	—	—	—	—	—
1925–26	Ottawa Senators	NHL	36	24	8	4	2251	42	15	1.12	2	0	1	1	120	2	0	1.00
1926–27	Ottawa Senators	NHL	44	30	10	4	2782	69	13	1.49	6	3	0	3	400	4	2	0.60
1927–28	Ottawa Senators	NHL	44	20	14	10	2760	57	15	1.24	2	0	2	0	120	3	0	1.50
1928–29	Ottawa Senators	NHL	44	14	17	13	2820	67	7	1.43	—	—	—	—	—	—	—	—
1929–30	Ottawa Senators	NHL	44	21	15	8	2780	118	3	2.55	2	0	1	1	120	6	0	3.00
1930–31	Ottawa Senators	NHL	36	10	22	4	2190	110	3	3.01	—	—	—	—	—	—	—	—
1931–32	Detroit Falcons	NHL	48	18	20	10	3050	108	6	2.12	2	0	1	1	120	3	0	1.50
1932–33	Ottawa Senators	NHL	15	4	8	2	845	36	1	2.56	—	—	—	—	—	—	—	—
1933–34	New York Americans	NHL	1	1	0	0	40	2	0	3.00	—	—	—	—	—	—	—	—
1934–35	Montreal Maroons	NHL	48	24	19	5	2970	92	9	1.86	7	5	0	2	429	8	2	1.12
1936–37	Montreal Maroons	NHL	27	10	11	6	1710	63	2	2.21	—	—	—	—	—	—	—	—
NHL totals			417	193	156	67	26,050	830	81	1.91	21	8	5	8	1309	26	4	1.19
