= Gerry Shannon =

Canadian ice hockey player

- Born: October 25, 1910; Campbellford, Ontario, Canada
- Died: May 6, 1983 (aged 72); Ottawa, Ontario, Canada
- Height: 5 ft 11 in (180 cm)
- Weight: 170 lb (77 kg; 12 st 2 lb)
- Position: Left wing
- Shot: Left
- Played for: Ottawa Senators; St. Louis Eagles; Boston Bruins; Montreal Maroons
- Playing career: 1933–1940

Gerald Edward "River" Shannon (October 25, 1910 – May 6, 1983) was a Canadian ice hockey left winger who played five seasons in the National Hockey League for the Ottawa Senators, St. Louis Eagles, Boston Bruins and Montreal Maroons between 1933 and 1938. Prior to turning professional he spent several years playing amateur senior hockey, and finished his career with three seasons in the minor International American Hockey League, retiring in 1940. He was born in Campbellford, Ontario.

== Career statistics ==
=== Regular season and playoffs ===
			Regular season					Playoffs
Season	Team	League	GP	G	A	Pts	PIM	GP	G	A	Pts	PIM
1926–27	Niagara Falls Cataracts	OHA Jr	—	—	—	—	—	4	2	0	2	0
1927–28	Niagara Falls Cataracts	OHA Jr	—	—	—	—	—	—	—	—	—	—
1928–29	Oakville Lions	OHA Jr	12	2	0	2	—	—	—	—	—	—
1929–30	Niagara Falls Cataracts	OHA Sr	4	7	4	11	0	2	2	1	3	0
1930–31	Port Colborne Sailors	OHA Sr	10	3	3	6	15	5	1	2	3	8
1931–32	Port Colborne Sailors	OHA Sr	20	6	3	9	38	4	0	0	0	4
1932–33	Niagara Falls Cataracts	OHA Sr	22	16	12	28	16	5	1	3	4	10
1932–33	Niagara Falls Cataracts	Al-Cup	—	—	—	—	—	6	3	0	3	0
1933–34	Ottawa Senators	NHL	48	11	15	26	26	—	—	—	—	—
1934–35	St. Louis Eagles	NHL	25	2	2	4	11	—	—	—	—	—
1934–35	Boston Bruins	NHL	17	1	1	2	4	—	—	—	—	—
1934–35	Boston Cubs	Can-Am	7	4	2	6	2	—	—	—	—	—
1935–36	Boston Bruins	NHL	23	0	1	1	6	—	—	—	—	—
1935–36	Boston Cubs	Can-Am	22	11	6	17	24	—	—	—	—	—
1936–37	Providence Reds	IAHL	8	1	3	4	7	—	—	—	—	—
1936–37	Montreal Maroons	NHL	31	9	7	16	13	5	0	1	1	0
1937–38	Montreal Maroons	NHL	36	0	3	3	20	—	—	—	—	—
1937–38	Springfield Indians	IAHL	8	2	1	3	0	—	—	—	—	—
1938–39	Hershey Bears	IAHL	31	9	2	11	4	5	1	1	2	8
1939–40	Hershey Bears	IAHL	52	13	18	31	8	6	1	2	3	2
NHL totals			180	23	29	52	80	9	0	1	1	2
