= Gene Carrigan =

Canadian ice hockey player

- Born: July 5, 1906; Edmonton, Alberta, Canada
- Died: March 15, 1945 (aged 38); Fort Worth, Texas, USA
- Height: 6 ft 1 in (185 cm)
- Weight: 200 lb (91 kg; 14 st 4 lb)
- Position: Centre
- Shot: Left
- Played for: New York Rangers; Detroit Red Wings; St. Louis Eagles
- Playing career: 1926–1942

Eugene Carrigan (July 5, 1906 – March 15, 1945) was a Canadian ice hockey centreman who played 37 games over three seasons in the National Hockey League for the New York Rangers, Detroit Red Wings and St. Louis Eagles. The rest of his career was spent in various minor leagues, and he retired in 1942. He was born in Edmonton, Alberta. He died of Hodgkin's disease in Fort Worth, Texas in 1945.

== Career statistics ==
=== Regular season and playoffs ===
			Regular season					Playoffs
Season	Team	League	GP	G	A	Pts	PIM	GP	G	A	Pts	PIM
1923–24	Edmonton Eskimos	EJrHL	—	—	—	—	—	—	—	—	—	—
1924–25	Edmonton Eskimos	EJrHL	—	—	—	—	—	—	—	—	—	—
1925–26	Camrose Canadiens	ASHL	—	—	—	—	—	—	—	—	—	—
1926–27	Edmonton Eskimos	PHL	19	0	0	0	4	—	—	—	—	—
1927–28	Hollywood Millionaires	Cal-Pro	—	—	—	—	—	—	—	—	—	—
1928–29	Springfield Indians	Can-Am	39	10	1	11	23	—	—	—	—	—
1928–29	Portland Buckaroos	PCHL	10	0	0	0	0	—	—	—	—	—
1928–29	Victoria Cubs	PCHL	2	0	0	0	0	—	—	—	—	—
1929–30	Springfield Indians	Can-Am	38	28	24	52	22	—	—	—	—	—
1930–31	New York Rangers	NHL	33	2	0	2	13	—	—	—	—	—
1930–31	Springfield Indians	Can-Am	13	5	10	15	10	7	4	4	8	2
1931–32	London Tecumsehs	IHL	48	19	9	28	27	6	0	0	0	5
1932–33	London Tecumsehs	IHL	41	19	14	33	23	6	2	3	5	2
1933–34	Detroit Olympics	IHL	43	17	18	35	19	4	2	3	5	0
1933–34	Detroit Red Wings	NHL	—	—	—	—	—	4	0	0	0	0
1934–35	Boston Cubs	Can-Am	42	19	37	56	18	3	1	1	2	2
1934–35	St. Louis Eagles	NHL	4	0	1	1	0	—	—	—	—	—
1935–36	Boston Cubs	Can-Am	18	3	7	10	4	—	—	—	—	—
1935–36	Detroit Olympics	IHL	28	5	13	18	11	6	0	4	4	2
1936–37	Springfield Indians	IAHL	47	6	11	17	22	5	0	0	0	0
1937–38	Springfield Indians	IAHL	14	1	7	8	0	—	—	—	—	—
1937–38	New Haven Eagles	IAHL	24	1	2	3	17	2	0	0	0	0
1938–39	St. Paul Saints	AHA	47	28	26	54	13	3	1	0	1	0
1939–40	St. Paul Saints	AHA	47	16	36	52	19	7	2	3	5	2
1940–41	St. Paul Saints	AHA	48	5	15	20	18	4	0	0	0	0
1941–42	Fort Worth Rangers	AHA	43	11	11	22	19	5	0	3	3	4
NHL totals			37	2	1	3	13	4	0	0	0	0
