= Syd Howe =

Canadian ice hockey player (1911–1976)

- Hockey Hall of Fame, 1965
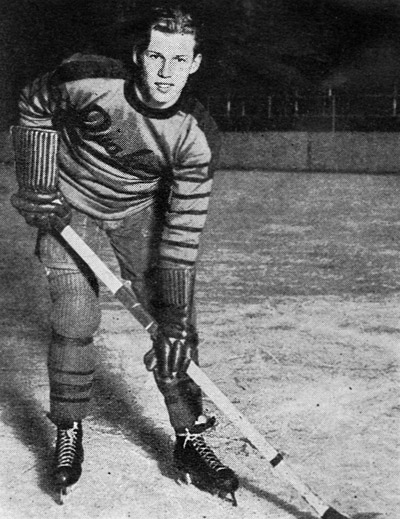
- Born: September 28, 1911 Ottawa, Ontario, Canada
- Died: May 20, 1976 (aged 64) Ottawa, Ontario, Canada
- Height: 5 ft 10 in (178 cm)
- Weight: 170 lb (77 kg; 12 st 2 lb)
- Position: Left wing
- Shot: Left
- Played for: Ottawa Senators; Philadelphia Quakers; Toronto Maple Leafs; St. Louis Eagles; Detroit Red Wings
- Playing career: 1929–1946

Sydney Harris Howe (September 18, 1911 – May 20, 1976) was a Canadian professional ice hockey player. Howe played 17 seasons in the National Hockey League (NHL) for the Ottawa Senators, Philadelphia Quakers, Toronto Maple Leafs, St. Louis Eagles and Detroit Red Wings.

== Playing career ==
Howe played in the NHL from 1929–30 to 1945–46 primarily with the Detroit Red Wings where he would enjoy his greatest personal and team successes. One of the leading scorers of his era, Syd Howe was a part of three Stanley Cup championships with the Red Wings.

Syd Howe often skated on Patterson's Creek and the Rideau Canal with his brother Lawrence 'Pete' Howe while growing up in his hometown of Ottawa, Ontario. He played hockey with the Glebe Collegiate high school team and the Lansdowne Park Juveniles in 1926 before joining the Ottawa Gunners junior team in the newly formed Ottawa City Hockey League. He and his Gunners teammates became the first Ottawa club to reach the Memorial Cup finals when they took on the Regina Monarchs in 1928, losing the best-of-three final by two games to one. Howe was a top scorer during the playoffs, registering nine goals and 13 points in eight games.

He joined the NHL with his hometown Ottawa Senators for the last 12 games of the 1929–30 season and was loaned to the Philadelphia Quakers for the 1930–31 season, the Quakers' only year of existence. When Ottawa suspended operations for the 1931–32 season, Howe was picked up by the Toronto Maple Leafs in the dispersal draft, but he appeared in just three NHL games, spending most of his time on the farm with the Syracuse Stars of the International Hockey League. He was back with the Senators the following year and moved with the club to St. Louis, as a member of the St. Louis Eagles, in the 1934–35 season. (Howe holds the unique distinction of being the only man to play for both the Philadelphia Quakers and the St. Louis Eagles.) The Eagles sold Howe in February 1935 to the Detroit Red Wings, where his career could finally get on track.

Howe was on the ice in the Montreal Forum at 2:25 a.m. on March 25, 1936, when Mud Bruneteau scored in the sixth overtime period to give Detroit the win in game one of the best-of-five semi-final against the Montreal Maroons, the longest game in league history. The Red Wings went on to win the series and the Stanley Cup that spring and followed up with another Stanley Cup victory in 1937.

In 1939, while Howe was riding on a train, his 1937 Stanley Cup ring was stolen. No trace of it was ever seen until 2024, when it appeared as part of an online auction for hockey memorabilia. His descendants bought it back.

On March 19, 1940, Howe scored 25 seconds into overtime to give the Wings a 2–1 victory over the New York Americans in game one of the quarter-finals. It was Howe's most cherished moment of his career and would stand as the fastest overtime goal scored in NHL history for the next 29 years. He also set the modern-day NHL record by scoring six goals in a game on February 3, 1944, versus the New York Rangers, a record which has since been twice equaled but never bettered in over fifty years of play. He was named to the NHL Second Team All-Star squad as a left winger in 1945 and played in the 1939 benefit All-Star game for Babe Siebert.

In his NHL career, he scored 237 goals and 291 assists for 528 points in 691 games. In the playoffs, he totaled 17 goals and 27 assists for 44 points in 70 games. He won the Stanley Cup with Detroit Red Wings in 1936, 1937 and 1943. In 1934–35, he was runner-up to Charlie Conacher for the scoring title with 47 points in 50 games despite playing much of the season with the last-place St. Louis Eagles. In 1943–44, he racked up 32 goals and 60 points in just 46 games, however, league-wide scoring was inflated due to World War II. In a February 3, 1944 game against the New York Rangers, Howe scored six goals in a single game, a modern era record one shy of when Joe Malone scored seven in 1920 when most players stayed on the ice for the entire game.

Howe was an all-around player, shifting between left wing and centre as needed, killing penalties and dropping back to play defence in a pinch. Those who watched the team closely reported that Howe's ice time with the Red Wings would constitute an amazing total. Syd Howe became the NHL's all-time leading point scorer on March 8, 1945, surpassing Nels Stewart's previous record of 515. Howe held all time record with 528 points until Bill Cowley surpassed him in 1947.

Upon playing his last NHL game in 1946, Howe was the last active player who played for the Philadelphia Quakers and the original era of the Ottawa Senators. He would return to Ottawa, and play again for the Senators, now in the Quebec Senior Hockey League.

Although not related, right wing Gordie Howe joined the Red Wings the following season (1946–47) and remained with the club until 1971 thus giving the Wings a star forward named Howe on its roster for 37 consecutive seasons (1934–1971). Syd Howe was inducted into the Hockey Hall of Fame in 1965, and died eleven years later on May 20, 1976, of throat cancer at age 64. He was interred in the Capital Memorial Gardens in Ottawa.

== Awards and achievements ==
- 1936 - Stanley Cup champion
- 1937 - Stanley Cup champion
- 1943 - Stanley Cup champion
- 1965 - Inducted into the Hockey Hall of Fame

== Career statistics ==
| | | | Regular season | | | | | Playoffs |
| Season | Team | League | GP | G | A | Pts | PIM | GP | G | A | Pts | PIM |
|---|---|---|---|---|---|---|---|---|---|---|---|---|
| 1927–28 | Ottawa Gunners | OCHL | — | — | — | — | — | — | — | — | — | — |
| 1927–28 | Ottawa Gunners | M-Cup | — | — | — | — | — | 8 | 9 | 4 | 13 | 6 |
| 1928–29 | Ottawa Rideaus | OCHL | 15 | 7 | 1 | 8 | — | — | — | — | — | — |
| 1929–30 | Ottawa Rideaus | OCHL | 11 | 8 | 1 | 9 | 9 | — | — | — | — | — |
| 1929–30 | London Panthers | IHL | 5 | 1 | 0 | 1 | 0 | — | — | — | — | — |
| 1929–30 | Ottawa Senators | NHL | 12 | 1 | 1 | 2 | 0 | 2 | 0 | 0 | 0 | 0 |
| 1930–31 | Philadelphia Quakers | NHL | 44 | 9 | 11 | 20 | 20 | — | — | — | — | — |
| 1931–32 | Toronto Maple Leafs | NHL | 3 | 0 | 0 | 0 | 0 | — | — | — | — | — |
| 1931–32 | Syracuse Stars | IHL | 45 | 9 | 12 | 21 | 44 | — | — | — | — | — |
| 1932–33 | Ottawa Senators | NHL | 48 | 12 | 12 | 24 | 17 | — | — | — | — | — |
| 1933–34 | Ottawa Senators | NHL | 41 | 13 | 7 | 20 | 18 | — | — | — | — | — |
| 1934–35 | St. Louis Eagles | NHL | 36 | 14 | 13 | 27 | 23 | — | — | — | — | — |
| 1934–35 | Detroit Red Wings | NHL | 14 | 8 | 12 | 20 | 11 | — | — | — | — | — |
| 1935–36 | Detroit Red Wings | NHL | 48 | 16 | 14 | 30 | 26 | 7 | 3 | 3 | 6 | 2 |
| 1936–37 | Detroit Red Wings | NHL | 42 | 17 | 10 | 27 | 10 | 10 | 2 | 5 | 7 | 0 |
| 1937–38 | Detroit Red Wings | NHL | 47 | 8 | 19 | 27 | 14 | — | — | — | — | — |
| 1938–39 | Detroit Red Wings | NHL | 48 | 16 | 20 | 36 | 11 | 6 | 3 | 1 | 4 | 4 |
| 1939–40 | Detroit Red Wings | NHL | 48 | 14 | 23 | 37 | 17 | 5 | 2 | 2 | 4 | 2 |
| 1940–41 | Detroit Red Wings | NHL | 48 | 20 | 24 | 44 | 8 | 9 | 1 | 7 | 8 | 0 |
| 1941–42 | Detroit Red Wings | NHL | 48 | 16 | 19 | 35 | 6 | 12 | 3 | 5 | 8 | 0 |
| 1942–43 | Detroit Red Wings | NHL | 50 | 20 | 35 | 55 | 10 | 7 | 1 | 2 | 3 | 0 |
| 1943–44 | Detroit Red Wings | NHL | 46 | 32 | 28 | 60 | 6 | 5 | 2 | 2 | 4 | 0 |
| 1944–45 | Detroit Red Wings | NHL | 46 | 17 | 36 | 53 | 6 | 7 | 0 | 0 | 0 | 2 |
| 1945–46 | Indianapolis Capitals | AHL | 14 | 6 | 11 | 17 | 0 | — | — | — | — | — |
| 1945–46 | Detroit Red Wings | NHL | 26 | 4 | 7 | 11 | 9 | — | — | — | — | — |
| 1946–47 | Ottawa Senators | QSHL | 24 | 19 | 21 | 40 | 4 | 11 | 2 | 1 | 3 | 0 |
| NHL totals | | | 698 | 237 | 291 | 528 | 212 | 70 | 17 | 27 | 44 | 10 |

== See also ==
- List of players with 5 or more goals in an NHL game

| Preceded by Frank Finnigan | Ottawa Senators captain 1933–34 | Succeeded by None |
| Preceded by None | St. Louis Eagles captain 1934–35 | Succeeded by Position abolished |
| Preceded by Ebbie Goodfellow | Detroit Red Wings captain 1941–42 | Succeeded by Sid Abel |
