= Bill Beveridge =

Canadian ice hockey player

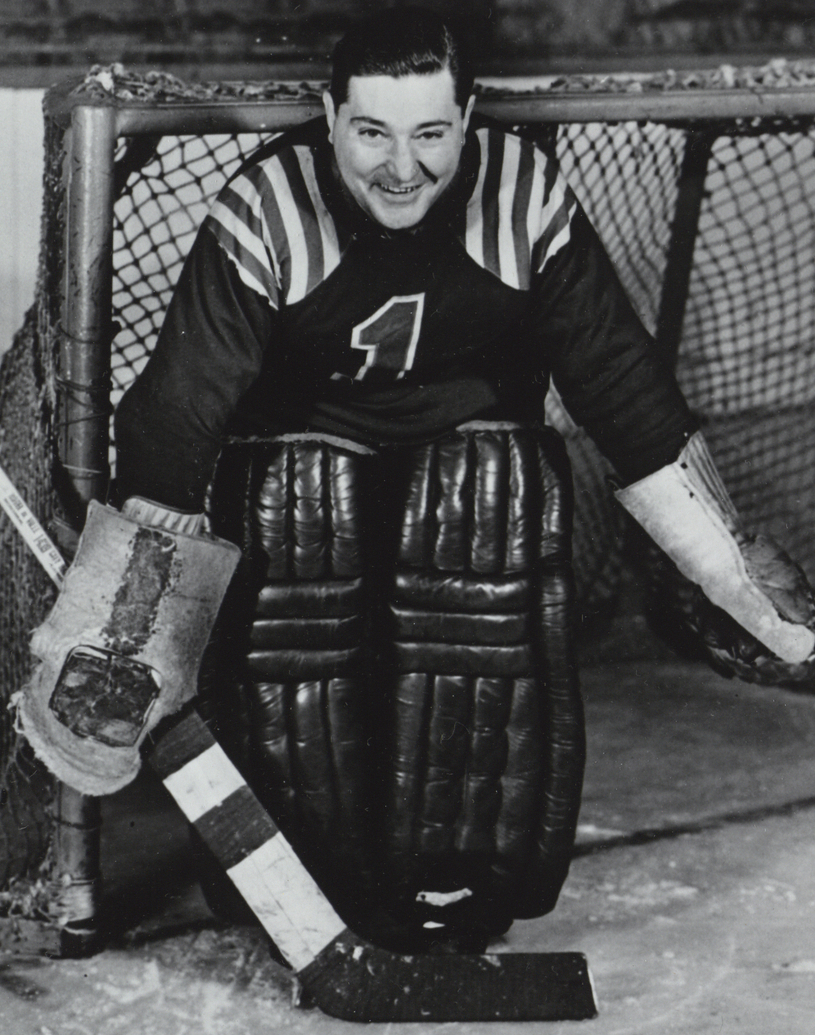
- Born: July 1, 1909 Ottawa, Ontario, Canada
- Died: February 13, 1995 (aged 85)
- Height: 5 ft 8 in (173 cm)
- Weight: 170 lb (77 kg; 12 st 2 lb)
- Position: Goaltender
- Caught: Left
- Played for: Detroit Cougars; Ottawa Senators; St. Louis Eagles; Montreal Maroons; New York Rangers
- Playing career: 1929–1943

William Stanley Beveridge (July 1, 1909 - February 13, 1995) was a Canadian ice hockey goaltender who played nine seasons in the National Hockey League (NHL) for the Detroit Cougars, Ottawa Senators, St. Louis Eagles, Montreal Maroons and New York Rangers.

== Playing career ==
The Ottawa Senators first signed Beveridge, but he broke in as an NHL rookie on loan to the Detroit Cougars in the 1929–30 NHL season. His season with Detroit was not successful and he was returned to the Senators shortly afterwards.

He first received playing time for the Senators during the 1930–31 season, playing eight games. The Senators were not a good team that year and his goals against average (GAA) was 3.69.

When Ottawa suspended operations for the 1931–32 season, Beveridge found himself in the minors with the Providence Reds, and led the Canadian–American Hockey League in wins that year.

Ottawa resumed play in the NHL for 1932–33 and Beveridge was back with the Senators as a backup to Alex Connell. After Connell injured his knee in a December game against Chicago, Beveridge had a chance to play regularly. He got three shutouts in his first eight games but following Connell's return, Beveridge only played if Connell struggled.

He played one more year for the Senators and stayed with the team when it relocated as the St. Louis Eagles. In April 1935 Beveridge was one of several former Eagles and Senators who took part in an exhibition game in Ottawa, in which players sported either Eagles of Senators uniforms as they played each other. When the Eagles folded after one season, the players were dispersed in a dispersal draft and he was picked up by the Montreal Canadiens for $4000. However, he never played for the Canadiens, being sold to the Montreal Maroons, again replacing Alex Connell following his retirement.

In 1935–36, the Maroons obtained Lorne Chabot from Chicago, and Beveridge could not get back in the line-up after Chabot took over goaltending duties. However, Chabot retired at 35 after the season, seemingly giving Beveridge another chance.

In 1936–37, Alex Connell returned to the Maroons, and Beveridge was his back-up yet again. Connell struggled and then Beveridge replaced Connell for a third time. This time Beveridge played well and the Maroons finished second in the Canadian Division, and defeated the Boston Bruins in opening round of the playoffs. Their opponent in the next series, the New York Rangers, were led by former Maroon goalie Dave Kerr who shut them out twice. This was the Maroons' final playoffs and Beveridge's only NHL playoff experience.

He played for minor league teams until the 1942–43 season when he received a call-up to the New York Rangers to replace the injured Jimmy Franks. He played in 17 games and recorded a shutout. After the season, he joined the Canadian Army.

After his service, he finished his playing days playing senior league hockey for the Ottawa Commandos (as the amateur Ottawa Senators were named during World War II) of the Quebec Senior Hockey League (QSHL).

== After hockey ==
After retiring from hockey for good in 1945, Beveridge became a coach at Carleton University. He also became a city councillor.

As one of the last surviving Ottawa Senators, he was present at the opening game in 1992 for the new Ottawa Senators. He died on February 13, 1995. He is interred in Beechwood Cemetery in Ottawa.

== Career statistics ==
=== Regular season and playoffs ===
			Regular season								Playoffs
Season	Team	League	GP	W	L	T	Min	GA	SO	GAA	GP	W	L	T	Min	GA	SO	GAA
1924–25	Ottawa Shamrocks	OJCHL	5	2	3	0	300	12	0	2.40	—	—	—	—	—	—	—	—
1924–25	Ottawa Shamrocks	OCHL	6	3	3	0	400	23	0	3.45	—	—	—	—	—	—	—	—
1925–26	Ottawa Shamrocks	OCHL	15	5	10	0	900	41	2	2.73	—	—	—	—	—	—	—	—
1926–27	Ottawa New Edinburghs	OCHL	—	—	—	—	—	—	—	—	5	3	2	0	300	4	2	0.80
1927–28	Ottawa New Edinburghs	OCHL	15	10	4	1	900	27	—	1.80	6	3	3	0	360	9	2	1.50
1928–29	Ottawa New Edinburghs	OCHL	15	9	6	0	900	17	7	1.13	2	2	0	0	120	6	0	3.00
1929–30	Detroit Cougars	NHL	39	14	20	5	2410	109	2	2.71	—	—	—	—	—	—	—	—
1930–31	Ottawa Senators	NHL	9	0	8	0	520	32	0	3.69	—	—	—	—	—	—	—	—
1931–32	Providence Reds	Can-Am	40	23	11	6	2510	108	5	2.58	5	5	0	0	310	6	1	1.16
1932–33	Ottawa Senators	NHL	33	7	19	7	2063	89	5	2.59	—	—	—	—	—	—	—	—
1932–33	Providence Reds	Can-Am	5	2	3	0	300	10	1	2.00	—	—	—	—	—	—	—	—
1933–34	Ottawa Senators	NHL	48	13	29	6	3000	143	3	2.86	—	—	—	—	—	—	—	—
1934–35	St. Louis Eagles	NHL	48	11	31	6	2990	144	3	2.89	—	—	—	—	—	—	—	—
1935–36	Montreal Maroons	NHL	32	14	13	5	1970	71	1	2.16	—	—	—	—	—	—	—	—
1936–37	Montreal Maroons	NHL	21	12	6	3	1290	47	1	2.19	—	—	—	—	—	—	—	—
1937–38	Montreal Maroons	NHL	48	12	30	6	2980	149	2	3.00	—	—	—	—	—	—	—	—
1938–39	Syracuse Stars	IAHL	4	3	1	0	240	11	1	2.75	—	—	—	—	—	—	—	—
1938–39	New Haven Eagles	IAHL	50	13	25	10	3000	144	5	2.88	—	—	—	—	—	—	—	—
1938–39	Providence Reds	IAHL	2	0	2	0	120	9	0	4.50	5	2	3	0	360	15	1	2.50
1939–40	Syracuse Stars	IAHL	56	20	27	9	3450	169	3	2.94	—	—	—	—	—	—	—	—
1940–41	Buffalo Bisons	AHL	55	19	27	9	3470	172	3	2.97	—	—	—	—	—	—	—	—
1941–42	Cleveland Barons	AHL	31	16	12	2	1870	73	7	2.34	5	3	2	0	310	12	0	2.32
1942–43	New York Rangers	NHL	17	4	10	3	1020	89	1	5.24	—	—	—	—	—	—	—	—
1943–44	Ottawa Commandos	QSHL	1	0	1	0	60	12	0	12.00	—	—	—	—	—	—	—	—
1944–45	Ottawa Commandos	QSHL	3	—	—	—	180	16	0	5.33	—	—	—	—	—	—	—	—
NHL totals			295	87	166	41	18243	873	18	2.87	5	2	3	0	300	11	0	2.20
