= Frank Finnigan =

Canadian ice hockey player

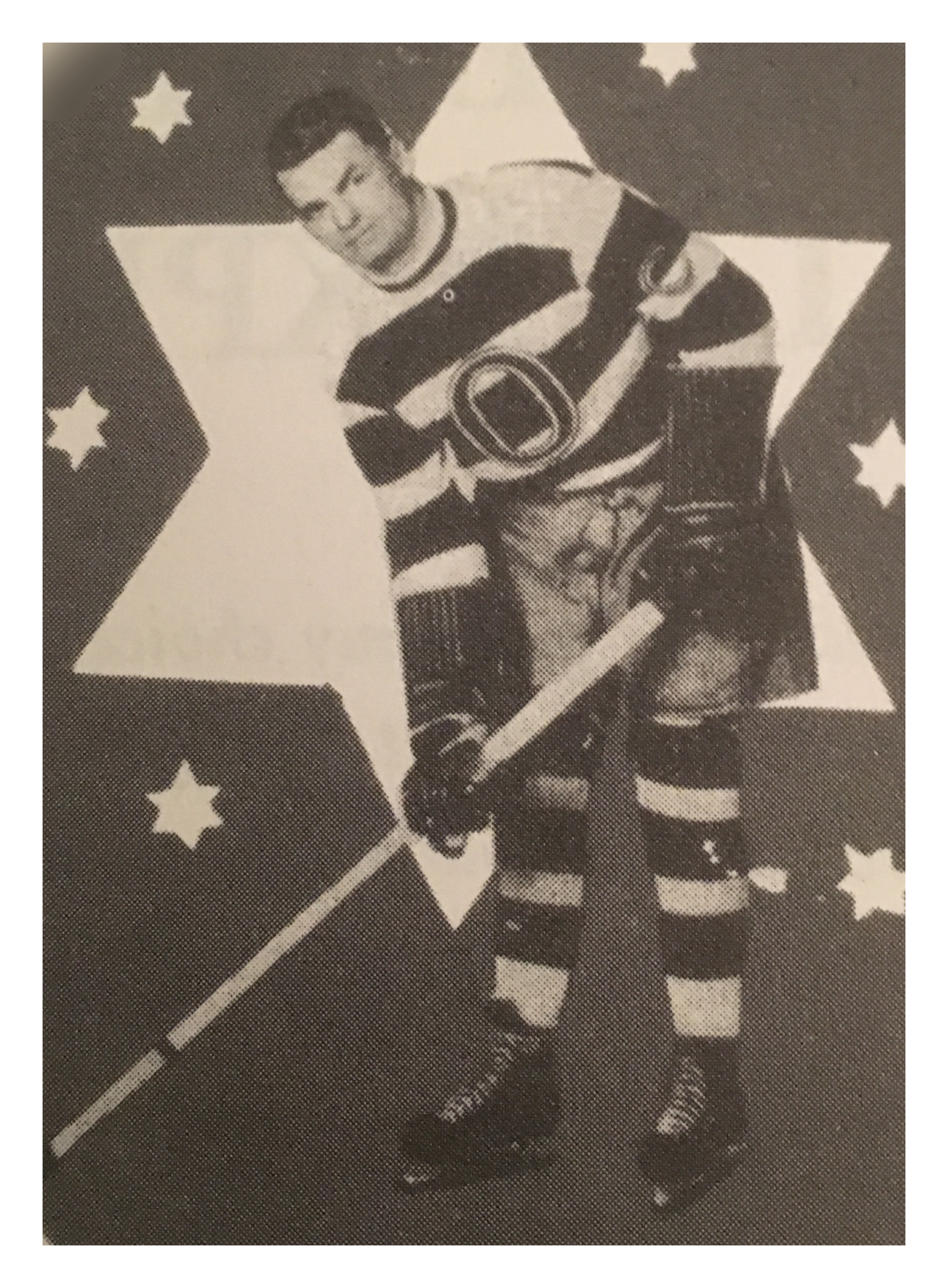
- Born: July 9, 1901 Clarendon, Quebec, Canada
- Died: December 25, 1991 (aged 90) Shawville, Quebec, Canada
- Height: 5 ft 9 in (175 cm)
- Weight: 165 lb (75 kg; 11 st 11 lb)
- Position: Right wing
- Shot: Right
- Played for: Ottawa Senators; Toronto Maple Leafs; St. Louis Eagles
- Playing career: 1923–1937

Francis Arthur Clarence Finnigan (July 9, 1901 – December 25, 1991), nicknamed "The Shawville Express", was a Canadian ice hockey professional forward who played in the National Hockey League (NHL) from 1923 to 1937. During this time, he played for the Ottawa Senators, Toronto Maple Leafs, and St. Louis Eagles, and was nicknamed the "Shawville Express." His younger brother Eddie Finnigan also played in the NHL. His daughter Joan Finnigan became a published writer. He was the last surviving member of the 1927 Stanley Cup champion Senators.

== Personal life ==
Frank Finnigan was born in 1901 in Clarendon, Quebec, but grew up in Shawville, Quebec, a primarily anglophone town in the province of Quebec, located northwest of Ottawa along the Ottawa River. He retained a home in Shawville after becoming a professional hockey player. He married Maye Horner (1901–1992) and the couple had four children, Joan (1925–2007), Frank Jr., Norma and Ross. Finnigan suffered a heart attack on December 18, 1991, and he died on Christmas Day in 1991 in Shawville Hospital.

== Playing career ==
Finnigan learned at an early age that there was money to be made in hockey. He received his first fee for playing hockey when he was 13, playing for Quyon against Fitzroy Harbour, for which he received $10. Finnigan first played senior-level hockey for the University of Ottawa in the Ottawa City Hockey League (OCHL) in nearby Ottawa in 1921–22. According to Finnigan, he was paid to play for the university and did not have to submit any assignments. As he had to take the train from Shawville to Ottawa, he picked up the nickname "Shawville Express." He played two more seasons for teams in the OCHL, with Ottawa Collegiate and Ottawa Montagnards before joining the Ottawa Senators in the 1923–24 season for two games. He signed his first contract with the Senators in 1924 for CA$1,800 (equivalent to $32,840 in 2025), and with bonuses was CA$3,400 (equivalent to $61,349 in 2025).

Finnigan was an integral member of the 1927 Stanley Cup champion Senators team, playing on a line with Hec Kilrea and Frank Nighbor. He later served as the Senators captain from 1930 to 1933, and scored a high of 21 goals in the 1929–30 season. When the Senators suspended operations for the 1931–32 NHL season, Finnigan played for the Toronto Maple Leafs, winning the Stanley Cup for a second time, returning to the Senators the following season. Finnigan scored the final Senators goal in the final season that the NHL Senators played in Ottawa. He scored an unassisted goal at the 1 minute, 7 second mark of the second period on March 15, 1934. The following season, he moved with the other Senators players to play for the transferred franchise in St. Louis, Missouri known as the St. Louis Eagles in the 1934–35 season. He was sold by the Eagles to the Maple Leafs before the season's end in February 1935 and he finished his career with several seasons with the Maple Leafs as a "defensive specialist."

== Retirement ==
In 1937, Finnigan retired from the NHL. He returned to Ottawa and played ice hockey for various amateur teams, including the Ottawa RCAF Flyers while he was in the Air Force.

After retiring from professional hockey, Finnigan went into private business in the Ottawa area. He managed the Olde Colonial Hotel at the corner of O'Connor and Queen Streets in Ottawa. Finnigan sold his shares of the hotel and became head of sales for Brading's Brewery. It was while working at Brading's that Finnigan developed alcoholism and lost his job. He found a job in the Government of Canada through Frank Ahearn, former owner of the Senators, and later Member of Parliament in Ottawa. During World War II, Finnigan joined the Canadian Air Force, and was a member for seven years. Finnigan then owned and managed the Merrickville Hotel in Merrickville, Ontario. Finnigan moved to Shawville and bought the Clarendon Hotel. Finnigan eventually overcame his problems with alcohol and sold the hotel and retired, remaining in the Shawville area.

== The 'Bring Back The Senators' campaign ==
When the NHL planned to expand in 1989, the consortium to obtain a franchise for Ottawa signed Finnigan to be part of the 'Bring Back The Senators' campaign team. Finnigan along with his son Frank Jr., made public appearances on behalf of the campaign. Finnigan was also part of the presentation team to the NHL expansion committee in December 1990. The group was successful and the new Ottawa Senators team began play in the 1992–93 NHL season.

Finnigan died before the new team played its first game in 1992, for which he was scheduled to drop the puck for the ceremonial face-off. Instead, on opening night the honour went to his son, Frank Jr. to drop the puck. On that night, the team honoured him by retiring his #8 jersey, making him one of three players in NHL history to have his uniform retired by a team for which he never actually played. Finnigan's number was retired 55 years after he finished his NHL career – the longest wait for a player to have his number retired.

The street in front of the main entrance to the Ottawa Senators' arena, Canadian Tire Centre, is named Frank Finnigan Way in his honour. A banner honouring his retired number hangs from the rafters with Daniel Alfredsson's number 11, Chris Phillips' number 4 and Chris Neil's number 25.

At the time of his death, Finnigan was the last surviving member of the Senators Stanley Cup-winning team from the 1926–27 season, the final season of the original Ottawa Senators (1919–1927) dynasty and one of only a handful of players still alive from the NHL Senators' days. He was also the oldest living NHL player and appeared at various NHL functions.

== Career statistics ==
			Regular season					Playoffs
Season	Team	League	GP	G	A	Pts	PIM	GP	G	A	Pts	PIM
1921–22	U. of Ottawa	OCHL	5	1	3	4	0	—	—	—	—	—
1922–23	U. of Ottawa	OCHL	9	7	5	12	0	—	—	—	—	—
1923–24	Ottawa Montagnards	OCHL	10	4	1	5	—	3	0	0	0	—
1923–24	Ottawa Senators	NHL	2	0	0	0	0	2	0	0	0	2
1923–24	Ottawa Montagnards	AC	—	—	—	—	—	1	0	0	0	0
1924–25	Ottawa Senators	NHL	29	0	0	0	22	—	—	—	—	—
1925–26	Ottawa Senators	NHL	36	2	0	2	24	2	0	0	0	0
1926–27	Ottawa Senators	NHL	36	15	1	16	52	6	3	0	3	0
1927–28	Ottawa Senators	NHL	38	20	5	25	34	2	0	1	1	6
1928–29	Ottawa Senators	NHL	44	15	4	19	71	—	—	—	—	—
1929–30	Ottawa Senators	NHL	43	21	15	36	46	1	0	0	0	4
1930–31	Ottawa Senators	NHL	44	9	8	17	40	—	—	—	—	—
1931–32	Toronto Maple Leafs	NHL	47	8	13	21	45	7	2	3	5	8
1932–33	Ottawa Senators	NHL	45	4	14	18	37	—	—	—	—	—
1933–34	Ottawa Senators	NHL	48	10	10	20	10	—	—	—	—	—
1934–35	St. Louis Eagles	NHL	34	5	5	10	10	—	—	—	—	—
1934–35	Toronto Maple Leafs	NHL	11	2	0	2	2	7	1	2	3	2
1935–36	Toronto Maple Leafs	NHL	48	2	6	8	10	9	0	3	3	0
1936–37	Toronto Maple Leafs	NHL	48	2	7	9	4	2	0	0	0	0
1939–40	Ottawa RCAF Flyers	OCHL	4	0	2	2	3	—	—	—	—	—
1940–41	Toronto RCAF	TMHL	13	1	2	3	8	3	1	0	1	0
1944–45	Ottawa Depot #17	OCHL	7	0	4	4	4	—	—	—	—	—
NHL totals			553	115	88	203	407	38	6	9	15	22

== Awards ==
1927 Stanley Cup Champion

1932 Stanley Cup Champion

- Played in NHL All-Star Game (1934).

This was the NHL's first all-star game, held as a benefit for Toronto player Ace Bailey. The first official NHL All-Star Game was held in 1947.

Preceded by King Clancy	Ottawa Senators captain (Original Era); 1930–31 & 1932–33	Succeeded by Syd Howe
