= Ralph Bowman =

Canadian ice hockey player (1911–1990)

- Born: June 20, 1911 Winnipeg, Manitoba, Canada
- Died: October 17, 1990 (aged 79)
- Height: 5 ft 11 in (180 cm)
- Weight: 180 lb (82 kg; 12 st 12 lb)
- Position: Defence
- Shot: Left
- Played for: Ottawa Senators; St. Louis Eagles; Detroit Red Wings
- Playing career: 1933–1943

Ralph Blaylock "Scotty" Bowman (June 20, 1911 in Winnipeg, Manitoba – October 17, 1990) was a Canadian ice hockey player. Bowman played seven seasons in the National Hockey League for the Ottawa Senators, St. Louis Eagles and Detroit Red Wings.

On November 13, 1934, Bowman, then playing for the St. Louis Eagles, scored the first penalty shot goal in NHL history.

He was later inducted to the Manitoba Hockey Hall of Fame.

== Career statistics ==
=== Regular season and playoffs ===
			Regular season					Playoffs
Season	Team	League	GP	G	A	Pts	PIM	GP	G	A	Pts	PIM
1929–30	Toronto Parkdale Canoe Club	OHA	8	1	1	2	20	3	0	0	0	2
1930–31	Niagara Falls Cataracts	OHA	7	10	1	11	2	2	1	0	1	0
1931–32	Niagara Falls Cataracts	OHA	18	1	1	2	28	2	0	0	0	8
1932–33	Niagara Falls Cataracts	OHA	19	3	0	3	49	5	1	0	1	2
1932–33	Niagara Falls Cataracts	Mem-Cup	—	—	—	—	—	6	0	1	1	4
1933–34	Ottawa Senators	NHL	46	0	2	2	64	—	—	—	—	—
1934–35	St. Louis Eagles	NHL	31	2	2	4	51	—	—	—	—	—
1934–35	Detroit Red Wings	NHL	13	1	3	4	21	—	—	—	—	—
1935–36	Detroit Red Wings	NHL	48	3	2	5	44	7	2	1	3	2
1936–37	Detroit Red Wings	NHL	37	0	1	1	24	10	0	1	1	4
1937–38	Detroit Red Wings	NHL	45	0	2	2	26	—	—	—	—	—
1938–39	Detroit Red Wings	NHL	43	2	3	5	26	5	0	0	0	0
1939–40	Detroit Red Wings	NHL	11	0	2	2	4	—	—	—	—	—
1939–40	Indianapolis Capitals	IAHL	12	1	2	3	8	5	0	0	0	0
1940–41	Pittsburgh Hornets	AHL	48	1	4	5	14	5	0	0	0	0
1941–42	Philadelphia Rockets	AHL	55	3	6	9	92	—	—	—	—	—
1942–43	Hershey Bears	AHL	11	0	3	3	2	—	—	—	—	—
1942–43	Washington Lions	AHL	36	1	11	12	12	—	—	—	—	—
NHL totals			274	8	17	25	260	22	2	2	4	6

== Awards and achievements ==
- Stanley Cup Championships (1936 & 1937)
- Honoured Member of the Manitoba Hockey Hall of Fame
