= St. Louis Eagles =

Ice hockey team

- Founded: 1883
- History: Ottawa Senators; 1883–1934; St. Louis Eagles; 1934–1935
- Home arena: St. Louis Arena
- City: St. Louis, Missouri
- Team colors: Red, white, blue
- Owner: Ottawa Auditorium

The St. Louis Eagles were a professional ice hockey team that played in the National Hockey League (NHL). Based in St. Louis, the Eagles played for only one year, the 1934–35 NHL season.

The team was founded in 1883 as the Ottawa Senators, a successful independent team that joined the NHL as a charter member in 1917. From the mid-1920s onward, they endured financial strain caused, in part, by being in the NHL's smallest market. The financial problems forced the Senators to suspend operations for the 1931–32 season. Upon their return to play, having sold their better players to raise funds, the Senators finished in last place for two straight seasons and continued to lose money. Following the repeat last-place finishes, the team decided that it could not survive in Ottawa and hoped to move to a bigger market.

In an attempt to recoup losses and pay outstanding debts, the Senators moved to St. Louis as the Eagles. However, the team continued to lose money because of increased travel expenses, and it was forced to sell players to other teams to meet its financial obligations.

After the season, the owners asked the NHL for permission to suspend operations for a second time. This time, the NHL refused the request. Instead, the league bought back the franchise, halted its operations, and dispersed its players among the remaining teams.

== History ==
=== The move from Ottawa ===
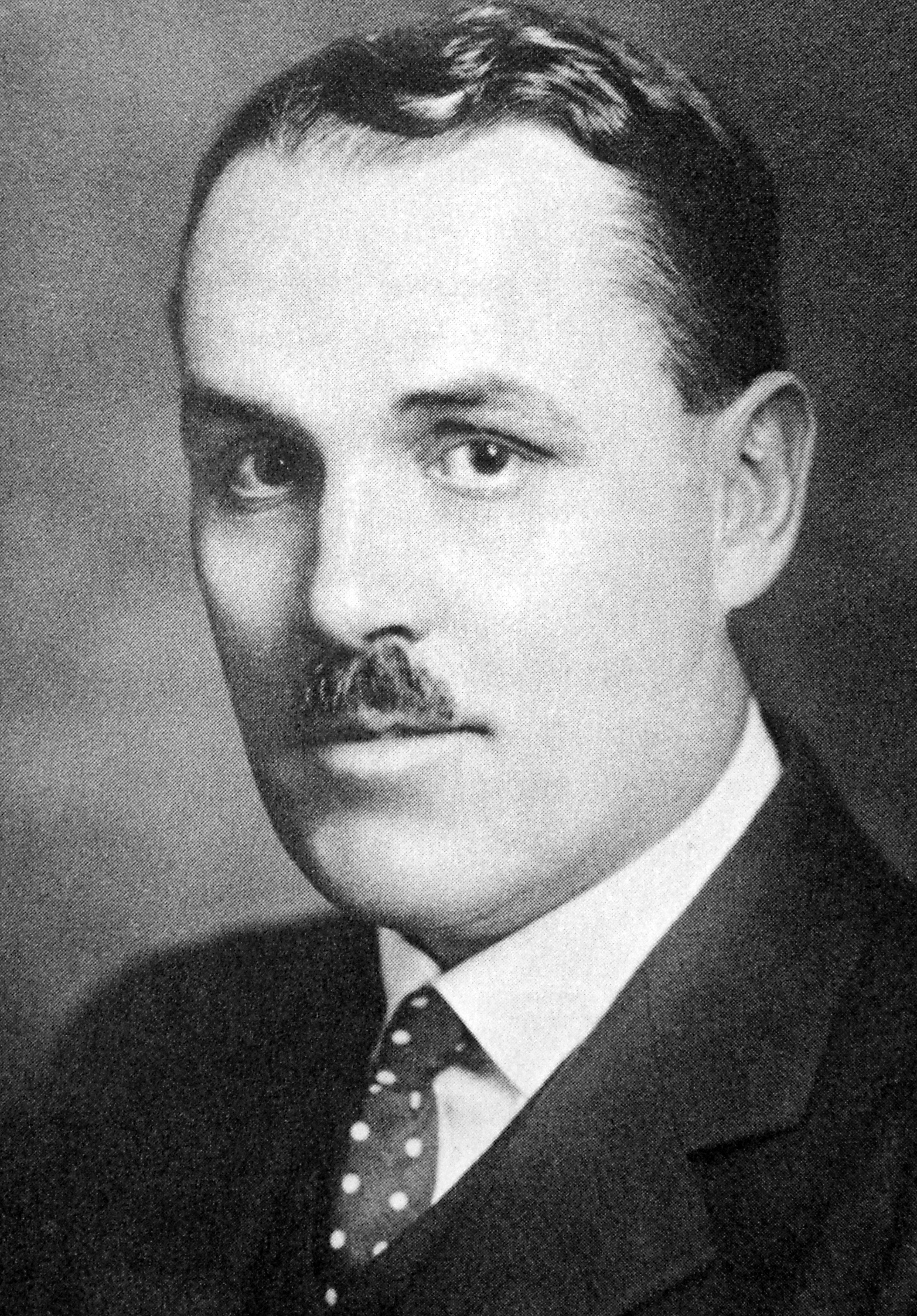
Thomas Franklin Ahearn, former president of the Ottawa Auditorium

The Ottawa Senators were founded in 1883 as an amateur club. They began paying their players "under the table" in 1903 and turned openly professional in 1907. They were a charter member of the National Hockey League (NHL) in 1917, and won the Stanley Cup four times in the NHL's first decade (and seven times before the league's formation—including their time as the Silver Seven).

However, for the better part of their tenure in Ottawa, the Senators played in the smallest market in the NHL. The 1931 census listed only 110,000 people in the city of Ottawa—roughly one-fifth the size of Toronto, the league's second-smallest market. The team started having attendance problems when the NHL expanded to the United States in 1924; games against the new American teams did not draw well. Despite winning what would be its last Stanley Cup in 1927, the team lost $50,000 for the season. The Senators asked the NHL for permission to suspend operations for the 1931–32 season to eliminate debt. The league granted the request. During their suspended season, Ottawa received $25,000 for the use of its players, while the NHL co-signed a Bank of Montreal loan of $28,000 for the franchise. The Senators returned for the 1932–33 season and finished in last place. They finished last again in 1933–34 season. After the season, the Ottawa Auditorium, owners of the Senators, announced that the team would be moving elsewhere for the next season due to losses of $60,000 over the previous two seasons. Auditorium officials said the losses were too great to recoup by selling players, and moving the Senators to a larger city was the only way to protect the Auditorium's shareholders and pay off their debts.

The Senators' owners decided to move the franchise to St. Louis, Missouri, and the transfer was approved by the league on May 14, 1934. Thomas Franklin Ahearn resigned as president of the Ottawa Auditorium and Redmond Quain became president. Quain transferred the players' contracts and franchise operations to a new company called the Hockey Association of St. Louis, Inc. Eddie Gerard was hired to coach the new team. The club was renamed the Eagles, inspired by the logo of the Anheuser-Busch brewing company, which was founded in St. Louis. The Senators name and logo remained in Ottawa and would be used by a senior amateur team until 1954. At the time, St. Louis was the seventh largest city in the United States, with over 800,000 inhabitants— over seven times larger than Ottawa. Despite this, St. Louis had been denied an NHL franchise in 1932 because travel to the Midwest was considered too expensive during the Great Depression.

Even before the debut of the Eagles, a problem had arisen for the new NHL club. There was already a professional hockey team in the city, the St. Louis Flyers, playing in the minor-pro American Hockey Association (AHA). The owners of the Flyers claimed they had an agreement with the NHL which prevented it from settling west of the Mississippi. They threatened to sue for $200,000 in compensation as soon as the Eagles played their first game. Following a visit from the AHA President, the Flyers were asked not to go forward with the lawsuit. The Flyers did not pursue further legal action and eventually changed their home arena.

=== 1934–35 season ===
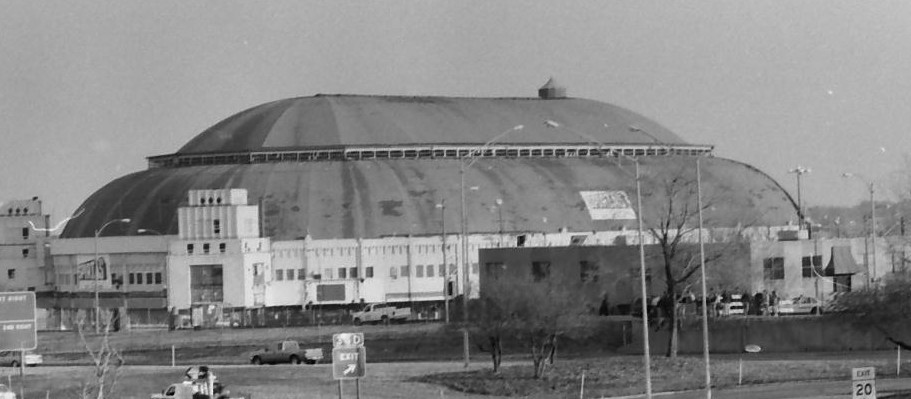
The St. Louis Arena, as it looked on the day of its demolition - February 27, 1999.

At the time there were nine teams in the NHL, divided into two divisions, the Canadian and American. In defiance of all geographic reality, the Eagles were not placed in the American Division with the Boston Bruins, Chicago Black Hawks, New York Rangers and Detroit Red Wings. Instead, the Eagles retained the Senators' place in the Canadian Division alongside the Toronto Maple Leafs, Montreal Canadiens, Montreal Maroons, and New York Americans. The core of the Senators' players returned and the team played their games in the St. Louis Arena. The arena was built in 1929 to host the National Dairy Show but had suffered financially. In 1931, an ice hockey rink was set up to attract new business. Once the Eagles began play, the St. Louis Arena gained the distinction of being the only NHL stadium with racially segregated seating.

In their first game, the Eagles succumbed to a late rally by the defending Stanley Cup champion Black Hawks, losing 3–1. They registered their first win in the next game winning 4–2 over the Rangers. Following the win the Eagles went on an eight-game losing streak. After the first 13 games the Eagles posted a 2–11–0 record placing them last in their division. Gerard resigned as head coach and was replaced by George "Buck" Boucher, the coach that Gerard himself had replaced after the franchise's last season in Ottawa.

Under Boucher's coaching the team showed improvement, posting a 3–3–3 record in the first nine games. However, the early losing streak had already damaged the fan base. Their inaugural game drew 12,622 fans, but attendance quickly diminished. In early January 1935, the team cut ticket prices to the lowest in the league in an attempt to bring out fans. By February the financial state of the team forced the Eagles to essentially sell leading goal scorer Syd Howe to the Detroit Red Wings. Officially, the trade broke down as such—Detroit received Howe and Ralph Bowman in exchange for Teddy Graham and $50,000. At the time it was considered a large sum of money. Likewise, Frank Finnigan was sold to the Maple Leafs. The Eagles were unable to maintain the early success under Boucher and finished with the worst record in the league for the third year in a row, with a record of 11–31–6. With only 84 goals scored, they were the lowest-scoring team in the league. Only the Montreal Canadiens allowed more goals during the season, surrendering 145 to the Eagles' 144.

=== The end of the Eagles ===
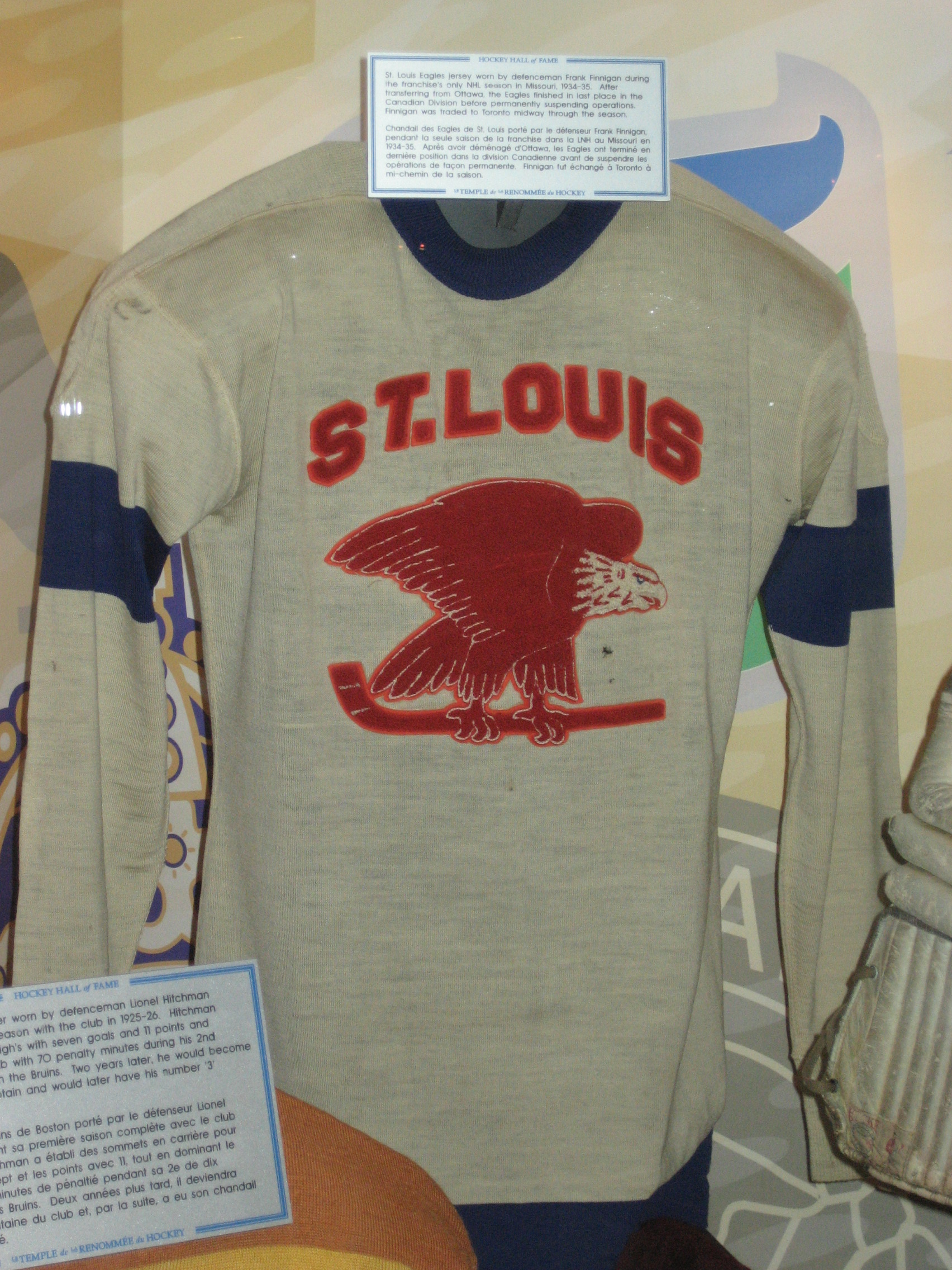
St. Louis Eagles NHL jersey on display in the Hockey Hall of Fame

By season's end, the Eagles ownership had lost $70,000, due primarily to the cost of train travel. In those days, NHL teams traveled primarily by rail. Due to being in the Canadian Division, the Eagles had to make many trips to Montreal and Toronto. An attempt to stabilize the franchise by selling off some of its players netted $58,000. The owners had hoped to move again to save the franchise. There was interest from Cleveland and also in a return to Ottawa, but neither came to fruition.

As a result, the ownership again petitioned the NHL to allow them to suspend operations for a year. This time the NHL refused and the Eagles were put up for sale. After no credible offers surfaced, the NHL bought the franchise and player contracts for $40,000 and opted to play as an eight-team league. If the NHL ever resold the franchise, proceeds were to go to the Ottawa Hockey Association. The NHL distributed the players under contract with St. Louis through a dispersal draft. Teams selected players in an order based on the previous season's standings. Teams with the lowest point totals were selected first. The Chicago Black Hawks did not participate in the draft. Eighteen of the 23 players under contract were selected with the remaining players being placed in the minor leagues. The players were distributed as follows:

- New York Americans: Forwards: Pete Kelly, Eddie Finnigan
- Montreal Canadiens: Goaltender: Bill Beveridge, Defenseman: Irv Frew, Forwards: Paul Drouin, Henri Lauzon
- Detroit Red Wings: Forward: Carl Voss, Goaltender: William Peterkin
- New York Rangers: Forward: Glen Brydson, Defenseman: Vernon Ayres
- Montreal Maroons: Forward: Joe Lamb, Goaltender: Bill Taugher
- Boston Bruins: Forward: Bill Cowley, Defenseman: Teddy Graham
- Toronto Maple Leafs: Forwards: Gerry Shannon, Cliff Purpur, Jim Dewey, Defenseman: Mickey Blake

No credible offers to purchase the dormant franchise ever surfaced. As a result, the Senators/Eagles franchise never took the ice again, and remained one of two NHL teams to fold after winning a Stanley Cup (the other being the Maroons).

In 1938, the Montreal Maroons attempted to move to St. Louis. They were denied by the NHL due to the high travel costs that plagued the Eagles. The NHL returned to St. Louis in 1967, when the league doubled in size from the Original Six. The new team was named the Blues and they joined the Minnesota North Stars, Los Angeles Kings, Oakland Seals, Philadelphia Flyers, and Pittsburgh Penguins as part of the new expansion.

== Final standings ==
Canadian Division
	GP	W	L	T	GF	GA	PTS
**Toronto Maple Leafs**	48	30	14	4	157	111	64
**Montreal Maroons**	48	24	19	5	123	92	53
**Montreal Canadiens**	48	19	23	6	110	145	44
New York Americans	48	12	27	9	100	142	33
St. Louis Eagles	48	11	31	6	86	144	28

Note: W = Wins, L = Losses, T = Ties, GF = Goals For, GA = Goals Against, Pts = Points
Teams that qualified for the playoffs are highlighted in bold.

== Players ==
Twenty-nine players represented the Eagles during their lone season of existence. The last active player who played with the Eagles was Bill Cowley, who retired in 1947 after his final season with the Boston Bruins. He was also the only player in franchise history to start his career with the Eagles and be inducted into the Hockey Hall of Fame. Syd Howe was the only captain of the team during its existence and the two players were the only Eagles players to be inducted into the Hall of Fame. Pete Kelly was the last surviving St. Louis Eagle, dying in 2004.

Carl Voss led the team with 18 assists and 31 points Howe led them in goalscoring registering 14, despite being traded midway through the season. The totals were much lower than the NHL leaders as Charlie Conacher of Toronto led the league with 36 goals and 57 points, while Art Chapman of the Americans led for assists notching 34. Bill Beveridge was the only goaltender the team used during the season. Out of his 11 wins, three were shutouts.

The list of players in the history of the team is presented below.

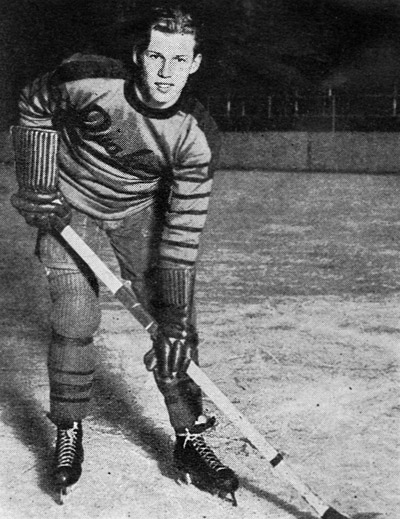
Syd Howe (shown here with the Philadelphia Quakers) was the captain and leading goalscorer for the Eagles.

Player	Pos	GP	G	A	Pts	PIM
Oscar Asmundson	C	11	4	7	11	2
Vernon Ayres	D	47	2	2	4	60
Mickey Blake	LW/D	8	1	1	2	2
Ralph Bowman	D	31	2	2	4	51
Glen Brydson	RW	48	11	18	29	45
Gene Carrigan	C	4	0	1	1	0
Bud Cook	C	4	0	0	0	0
Bill Cowley	C	41	5	7	12	10
Ed Finnigan	LW	12	1	1	2	2
Frank Finnigan	RW	34	5	5	10	10
Irv Frew	D	48	0	2	2	89
Ted Graham	D	13	0	0	0	2
Syd Howe	C/LW	36	14	13	27	23
Frank Jerwa	LW/D	16	4	7	11	14
Walter Kalbfleisch	D	3	0	0	0	6
Max Kaminsky	C	12	0	0	0	0
Pete Kelly	RW	25	3	10	13	14
Joe Lamb	RW	31	11	12	23	19
George Patterson	W	21	0	1	1	2
Fido Purpur	RW	25	1	2	3	8
Vic Ripley	LW	31	1	5	6	10
Earl Roche	LW	19	3	3	6	2
Des Roche	RW	7	0	0	0	0
Gerry Shannon	LW	25	2	2	4	11
Carl Voss	C	48	13	18	31	14
Nick Wasnie	RW	13	3	1	4	2
Archie Wilcox	RW/D	8	0	0	0	0
Burr Williams	D	9	0	0	0	6

Goaltending

Player	MIN	GP	W	L	T	GA	GAA	SO
Bill Beveridge	2990	48	11	31	6	144	2.89	3
Team:	2990	48	11	31	6	144	2.89	3

All player stats taken from Hockey-Reference.com

=== Team captains ===
- Syd Howe, 1934–35
