= Vernon Ayres =

Canadian ice hockey player

- Born: April 27, 1909 Toronto, Ontario, Canada
- Died: February 18, 1968 (aged 59) Scarborough, Ontario, Canada
- Height: 6 ft 2 in (188 cm)
- Weight: 220 lb (100 kg; 15 st 10 lb)
- Position: Defence
- Shot: Left
- Played for: New York Americans; Montreal Maroons; St. Louis Eagles; New York Rangers
- Playing career: 1930–1942

Thomas Vernon Ayres (April 27, 1909 – February 18, 1968) was a Canadian ice hockey defenceman. Ayres played six seasons in the National Hockey League for the New York Americans, Montreal Maroons, St. Louis Eagles and New York Rangers and twelve seasons of professional ice hockey overall.

== Career statistics ==
=== Regular season and playoffs ===
			Regular season					Playoffs
Season	Team	League	GP	G	A	Pts	PIM	GP	G	A	Pts	PIM
1927–28	Toronto Parkdale Canoe Club	OHA	9	3	1	4	—	1	0	0	0	—
1928–29	Toronto Parkdale Canoe Club	OHA	8	4	1	5	—	—	—	—	—	—
1929–30	Toronto Young Rangers	OHA	—	—	—	—	—	—	—	—	—	—
1929–30	Toronto Stockyards	TMHL	5	1	0	1	4	1	1	0	1	2
1930–31	New York Americans	NHL	26	2	1	3	54	—	—	—	—	—
1930–31	New Haven Eagles	Can-Am	8	1	0	1	22	—	—	—	—	—
1931–32	New York Americans	NHL	45	2	4	6	82	—	—	—	—	—
1932–33	New York Americans	NHL	48	0	0	0	97	—	—	—	—	—
1933–34	Montreal Maroons	NHL	17	0	0	0	19	—	—	—	—	—
1933–34	Quebec Castors	Can-Am	29	0	4	4	52	—	—	—	—	—
1934–35	St. Louis Eagles	NHL	47	2	2	4	60	—	—	—	—	—
1935–36	New York Rangers	NHL	28	0	4	4	38	—	—	—	—	—
1935–36	Philadelphia Ramblers	Can-Am	20	4	6	10	26	4	0	0	0	8
1936–37	Philadelphia Ramblers	IAHL	49	4	7	11	44	6	0	0	0	2
1937–38	Philadelphia Ramblers	IAHL	44	1	11	12	34	5	0	1	1	2
1938–39	Hershey Bears	IAHL	52	3	5	8	19	5	0	1	1	0
1939–40	Pittsburgh Hornets	IAHL	54	0	10	10	37	1	0	0	0	0
1940–41	St. Louis Flyers	AHA	38	1	7	8	20	9	0	2	2	2
1941–42	St. Louis Flyers	AHA	45	2	9	11	36	3	1	0	1	6
IAHL/AHL totals			282	11	49	60	190	29	1	4	5	12
NHL totals			211	6	11	17	350	—	—	—	—	—
