= Mickey Blake =

Canadian ice hockey player

- Born: October 31, 1912; Barriefield, Ontario, Canada
- Died: June 23, 2000 (aged 87)
- Height: 5 ft 10 in (178 cm)
- Weight: 186 lb (84 kg; 13 st 4 lb)
- Position: Left wing
- Shot: Left
- Played for: Toronto Maple Leafs; St. Louis Eagles; Montreal Maroons
- Playing career: 1932–1943

Francis Joseph "Mickey" Blake (October 31, 1912 – June 23, 2000) was a Canadian ice hockey left winger who played ten games across three seasons in the National Hockey League for the Montreal Maroons, St. Louis Eagles and Toronto Maple Leafs. He also played several seasons in the minor leagues, in a career that lasted from 1932 to 1943. He was born in Barriefield, Ontario.

== Career statistics ==
=== Regular season and playoffs ===
			Regular season					Playoffs
Season	Team	League	GP	G	A	Pts	PIM	GP	G	A	Pts	PIM
1931–32	Kingston Frontenacs	OHA Sr	—	—	—	—	—	—	—	—	—	—
1932–33	Windsor Bulldogs	IHL	38	3	2	5	26	6	2	0	2	6
1932–33	Montreal Maroons	NHL	1	0	0	0	0	—	—	—	—	—
1933–34	Quebec Castors	Can-Am	40	6	3	9	36	—	—	—	—	—
1934–35	St. Louis Eagles	NHL	8	1	1	2	2	—	—	—	—	—
1934–35	Detroit Olympics	IHL	25	0	0	0	26	5	1	0	1	0
1935–36	Toronto Maple Leafs	NHL	1	0	0	0	2	—	—	—	—	—
1935–36	Syracuse Stars	IHL	43	17	17	34	27	3	0	0	0	0
1936–37	Syracuse Stars	IAHL	50	9	17	26	20	9	1	2	3	2
1937–38	Syracuse Stars	IAHL	25	2	4	6	14	8	0	0	0	2
1938–39	Cleveland Barons	IAHL	47	7	12	19	20	8	0	0	0	0
1939–40	Pittsburgh Hornets	IAHL	55	3	11	14	26	9	0	0	0	6
1940–41	Pittsburgh Hornets	AHL	56	18	14	32	28	6	0	2	2	0
1941–42	Pittsburgh Hornets	AHL	48	9	11	20	14	—	—	—	—	—
1942–43	Kingston Frontenacs	OHA Sr	16	6	3	9	2	4	1	0	1	2
IAHL/AHL totals			281	48	69	107	122	40	1	4	5	10
NHL totals			10	1	1	2	4	—	—	—	—	—
