= Glen Brydson =

Canadian ice hockey player

- Born: November 7, 1910; Swansea, Ontario, Canada
- Died: December 9, 1993 (aged 83); Halton Hills, Ontario, Canada
- Height: 5 ft 10 in (178 cm)
- Weight: 170 lb (77 kg; 12 st 2 lb)
- Position: Right Wing
- Shot: Right
- Played for: Montreal Maroons; St. Louis Eagles; New York Rangers; Chicago Black Hawks; New Haven Eagles; Springfield Indians; Pittsburgh Hornets
- Playing career: 1930–1942

Glenn Warren "Swampy" Brydson (November 7, 1910 — December 9, 1993) was a Canadian ice hockey right winger who played eight seasons in the National Hockey League (NHL) for the Montreal Maroons, St. Louis Eagles, New York Rangers and Chicago Black Hawks between 1930 and 1938. After leaving the NHL Brydson played five seasons seasons were spent in the International American Hockey League, which became the American Hockey League, where he played for the New Haven Eagles, Indianapolis Capitals, Springfield Indians, and Pittsburgh Hornets. After briefly playing senior hockey, he retired in 1942.

Brydson is interred at Park Lawn Cemetery in Toronto.

== Career statistics ==
=== Regular season and playoffs ===
			Regular season					Playoffs
Season	Team	League	GP	G	A	Pts	PIM	GP	G	A	Pts	PIM
1926–27	Toronto Canoe Club	OHA Jr	2	1	0	1	—	—	—	—	—	—
1927–28	Toronto Canoe Club	OHA Jr	9	3	0	3	—	3	3	0	3	—
1928–29	Toronto Canoe Club	OHA Jr	9	5	1	6	—	3	5	0	5	—
1929–30	Montreal AAA	MCHL	10	3	0	3	12	2	0	0	0	4
1930–31	Montreal AAA	MCHL	11	5	4	9	22	—	—	—	—	—
1930–31	Montreal Maroons	NHL	14	0	0	0	4	2	0	0	0	0
1931–32	Montreal Maroons	NHL	47	12	13	25	44	4	0	0	0	4
1932–33	Montreal Maroons	NHL	48	11	17	28	26	2	0	0	0	0
1933–34	Montreal Maroons	NHL	37	4	5	9	19	1	0	0	0	0
1933–34	Windsor Bulldogs	IHL	2	1	1	2	0	—	—	—	—	—
1934–35	St. Louis Eagles	NHL	48	11	18	29	45	—	—	—	—	—
1935–36	New York Rangers	NHL	30	4	12	16	7	—	—	—	—	—
1935–36	Chicago Black Hawks	NHL	22	6	4	10	32	2	0	0	0	4
1936–37	Chicago Black Hawks	NHL	34	7	7	14	20	—	—	—	—	—
1937–38	Chicago Black Hawks	NHL	19	1	3	4	6	—	—	—	—	—
1937–38	New Haven Eagles	IAHL	25	6	9	15	17	2	0	0	0	12
1938–39	New Haven Eagles	IAHL	51	8	25	33	18	—	—	—	—	—
1939–40	New Haven Eagles	IAHL	34	5	14	19	17	—	—	—	—	—
1939–40	Indianapolis Capitals	IAHL	5	4	2	6	2	—	—	—	—	—
1940–41	Springfield Indians	AHL	54	20	36	56	28	3	1	2	3	0
1941–42	Pittsburgh Hornets	AHL	45	8	17	25	2	—	—	—	—	—
1942–43	Kingston Frontenacs	OHA Sr	2	1	3	4	0	4	1	3	4	2
NHL totals			299	56	79	135	203	11	0	0	0	8
