= Joe Lamb =

Canadian ice hockey player

- Born: June 18, 1906; Sussex, New Brunswick, Canada
- Died: August 21, 1982 (aged 76)
- Height: 5 ft 10 in (178 cm)
- Weight: 199 lb (90 kg; 14 st 3 lb)
- Position: Right wing
- Shot: Right
- Played for: Detroit Red Wings; New York Americans; Montreal Maroons; St. Louis Eagles; Montreal Canadiens; Boston Bruins; Ottawa Senators
- Playing career: 1927–1940

Joseph Gordon Lamb (June 18, 1906 – August 21, 1982) was a professional ice hockey forward who played 11 seasons in the National Hockey League with the Montreal Maroons, Ottawa Senators, New York Americans, Boston Bruins, Montreal Canadiens, St. Louis Eagles and Detroit Red Wings. He is one of only six NHL players to have worn the number 99.

== Career statistics ==
=== Regular season and playoffs ===
			Regular season					Playoffs
Season	Team	League	GP	G	A	Pts	PIM	GP	G	A	Pts	PIM
1922–23	Sussex Dairy Kings	SNBHL	8	1	0	1	4	4	2	0	2	2
1923–24	Sussex Dairy Kings	SNBHL	6	3	4	7	2	6	4	1	5	2
1924–25	Sussex Dairy Kings	SNBHL	12	14	4	18	8	6	2	3	5	6
1925–26	Montreal Royal Bank	MCHL	9	3	2	5	12	—	—	—	—	—
1925–26	Montreal Young Royals	MCHL	6	6	4	10	6	—	—	—	—	—
1925–26	Montreal Young Royals	Mem-Cup	—	—	—	—	—	4	3	2	5	15
1926–27	Montreal Victorias	MCHL	7	5	3	8	26	—	—	—	—	—
1926–27	Montreal Victorias	Exhib	15	28	0	28	—	—	—	—	—	—
1927–28	Montreal Victorias	MCHL	7	4	4	8	6	—	—	—	—	—
1927–28	Montreal Royal Bank	MCBHL	9	5	6	11	30	—	—	—	—	—
1927–28	Montreal Maroons	NHL	21	8	5	13	39	8	1	0	1	32
1928–29	Montreal Maroons	NHL	30	4	1	5	44	—	—	—	—	—
1928–29	Ottawa Senators	NHL	6	0	0	0	8	—	—	—	—	—
1929–30	Ottawa Senators	NHL	44	29	20	49	119	2	0	0	0	11
1930–31	Ottawa Senators	NHL	44	11	14	25	91	—	—	—	—	—
1931–32	New York Americans	NHL	48	14	11	25	71	—	—	—	—	—
1932–33	Boston Bruins	NHL	42	11	8	19	68	5	0	1	1	6
1933–34	Boston Bruins	NHL	48	10	15	25	47	—	—	—	—	—
1934–35	Montreal Canadiens	NHL	7	3	2	5	4	—	—	—	—	—
1934–35	St. Louis Eagles	NHL	31	11	12	23	19	—	—	—	—	—
1935–36	Montreal Maroons	NHL	35	0	3	3	12	3	0	0	0	2
1936–37	New York Americans	NHL	48	3	9	12	53	—	—	—	—	—
1937–38	New York Americans	NHL	25	1	0	1	20	—	—	—	—	—
1937–38	Detroit Red Wings	NHL	14	3	1	4	6	—	—	—	—	—
1937–38	Pittsburgh Hornets	IAHL	6	2	0	2	4	—	—	—	—	—
1938–39	Springfield Indians	IAHL	51	11	16	27	72	3	0	1	1	4
1939–40	Springfield Indians	IAHL	54	20	14	34	44	3	0	0	0	4
NHL totals			443	108	101	209	601	18	1	1	2	51
