= 1933 Allan Cup =

Canadian senior ice hockey championship

The Allan Cup trophy

The 1933 Allan Cup was the Canadian senior ice hockey championship for the 1932–33 season.

== Final ==
Best of 3

- Moncton 3 Saskatoon 0
- Moncton 2 Saskatoon 0

Moncton Hawks beat Saskatoon Quakers 2–0 on series.
