= Boston Tigers (CAHL) =

The Boston Tigers were a professional ice hockey team based in Boston, Massachusetts from 1926 until 1936, playing in the Canadian–American Hockey League (CAHL).

== History ==
The club was known as the Boston Tigers from 1926 until 1931. The team then changed its name to the Boston Cubs for two seasons. It was then known as the Tiger Cubs for 1934–35 and finally the Boston Bruin Cubs for the final season of 1935–36.

The team won the championship of the CAHL three times: in 1929, 1933, and 1935.

== Notable players ==
- Woody Dumart
- Flash Hollett
- Eddie Oatman
- Lionel Hitchman
- Benny Grant
