= Ossie Asmundson =

Canadian ice hockey player

- Ossie Asmundson
- Born: November 17, 1908 Markerville, Alberta, Canada
- Died: November 2, 1964 (aged 55) Los Angeles, California, United States
- Height: 5 ft 11 in (180 cm)
- Weight: 170 lb (77 kg; 12 st 2 lb)
- Position: Right wing
- Shot: Right
- Played for: New York Rangers; Detroit Red Wings; St. Louis Eagles; New York Americans; Montreal Canadiens
- Playing career: 1928–1945

Oscar Ingolfur Asmundson (November 17, 1908 – November 2, 1964) was a Canadian ice hockey right winger who played six seasons in the National Hockey League. Asmundson won the Stanley Cup as a member of the New York Rangers in 1933. He was born in Markerville, Alberta, but grew up in Red Deer, Alberta. During World War II he competed with the United States Coast Guard Cutters hockey team. He also played several years in the minor leagues, primarily in the International American Hockey League/American Hockey League, and retired in 1945.

== Career statistics ==
Regular season and playoffs statistics
			Regular season					Playoffs
Season	Team	League	GP	G	A	Pts	PIM	GP	G	A	Pts	PIM
1928–29	Victoria Cubs	PCHL	29	2	2	4	6	—	—	—	—	—
1929–30	Victoria Cubs	PCHL	35	8	3	11	40	—	—	—	—	—
1930–31	Tacoma Tigers/Vancouver Lions	PCHL	30	10	2	12	36	4	1	0	1	4
1931–32	Bronx Tigers	Can-Am	40	15	16	31	61	1	0	0	0	0
1932–33	New York Rangers	NHL	48	5	10	15	20	8	0	2	2	4
1933–34	New York Rangers	NHL	46	2	6	8	8	1	0	0	0	0
1934–35	Detroit Red Wings	NHL	3	0	0	0	0	—	—	—	—	—
1934–35	Detroit Olympics	IHL	18	8	8	16	20	—	—	—	—	—
1934–35	St. Louis Eagles	NHL	11	4	7	11	2	—	—	—	—	—
1935–36	New Haven Eagles	Can-Am	25	4	11	15	26	—	—	—	—	—
1936–37	New York Americans	NHL	1	0	0	0	0	—	—	—	—	—
1936–37	New Haven Eagles	IAHL	44	13	22	35	32	—	—	—	—	—
1937–38	Montreal Canadiens	NHL	2	0	0	0	0	—	—	—	—	—
1937–38	New Haven Eagles	IAHL	44	13	26	39	57	2	0	0	0	0
1938–39	Cleveland Barons	IAHL	22	1	4	5	2	—	—	—	—	—
1939–40	Cleveland Barons	IAHL	39	14	18	32	34	—	—	—	—	—
1940–41	Cleveland Barons	AHL	48	8	22	30	33	9	3	3	6	15
1941–42	Philadelphia Rockets	AHL	54	13	33	46	48	—	—	—	—	—
1941–42	Providence Reds	AHL	2	0	2	2	0	—	—	—	—	—
1942–43	Washington Lions	AHL	41	9	19	28	32	—	—	—	—	—
1943–44	United States Coast Guard Cutters	EAHL	28	15	23	38	8	12	11	15	26	2
1944–45	Hollywood Wolves	PCHL	15	15	20	35	—	—	—	—	—	—
IAHL/AHL totals			294	71	146	217	238	11	3	3	6	15
NHL totals			111	11	23	34	30	9	0	2	2	4
