= Dave Downie =

Canadian ice hockey player

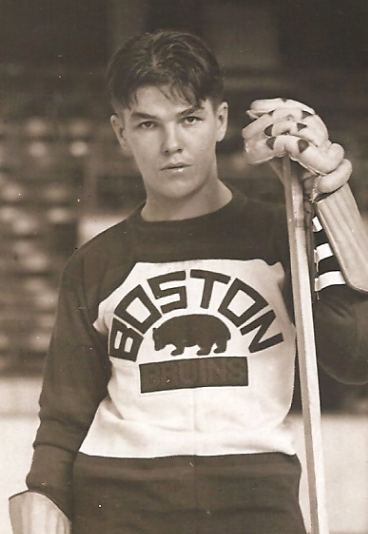
- Born: March 11, 1909 Burk's Falls, Ontario, Canada
- Died: March 18, 1963 (aged 54) Tacoma, Washington, USA
- Height: 5 ft 7 in (170 cm)
- Weight: 168 lb (76 kg; 12 st 0 lb)
- Position: Centre
- Shot: Right
- Played for: Toronto Maple Leafs
- Playing career: 1928–1945

David McKenzie Downie (March 11, 1909 – March 18, 1963) was a Canadian ice hockey player who played 11 games in the National Hockey League with the Toronto Maple Leafs during the 1932–33 season. The rest of his career, which lasted from 1928 to 1945, was spent in various minor leagues. Downie was born in Burk's Falls, Ontario.

== Career statistics ==
=== Regular season and playoffs ===
			Regular season					Playoffs
Season	Team	League	GP	G	A	Pts	PIM	GP	G	A	Pts	PIM
1925–26	Regina Falcons	S-SJHL	8	7	3	10	4	—	—	—	—	—
1925–26	Regina Falcons	M-Cup	—	—	—	—	—	3	2	1	3	10
1926–27	Regina Falcons	S-SJHL	6	6	1	7	0	1	0	0	0	0
1927–28	Vancouver Maroons	Al-Cup	—	—	—	—	—	9	4	1	5	4
1928–29	Victoria Cubs	PCHL	9	3	1	4	2	—	—	—	—	—
1928–29	Portland Buckaroos	PCHL	26	4	11	15	59	2	0	0	0	8
1929–30	Portland Buckaroos	PCHL	27	6	0	6	37	4	3	0	3	0
1930–31	Portland Buckaroos	PCHL	34	13	4	17	78	—	—	—	—	—
1931–32	Boston Cubs	Can-Am	8	1	0	1	12	—	—	—	—	—
1931–32	Syracuse Stars	IHL	37	12	7	16	46	—	—	—	—	—
1932–33	Toronto Maple Leafs	NHL	11	0	1	1	2	—	—	—	—	—
1932–33	Syracuse Stars	IHL	34	15	12	27	52	6	1	2	3	29
1933–34	Syracuse Stars	IHL	26	12	10	22	31	6	0	0	0	0
1934–35	Syracuse Stars	IHL	43	14	14	28	71	2	0	0	0	0
1935–36	Windsor Bulldogs	IHL	43	15	15	30	97	8	1	4	5	14
1936–37	Seattle Seahawks	PCHL	36	15	9	24	42	—	—	—	—	—
1937–38	Seattle Seahawks	PCHL	42	17	17	34	47	4	1	0	1	0
1938–39	Seattle Seahawks	PCHL	48	36	25	61	32	7	2	2	4	6
1939–40	Seattle Seahawks	PCHL	40	21	24	45	24	—	—	—	—	—
1940–41	Seattle Olympics	PCHL	41	24	28	52	47	2	0	0	0	2
1941–42	Philadelphia Rockets	AHL	9	1	0	1	0	—	—	—	—	—
1943–44	Seattle Ironmen	NorIHL	9	19	9	28	7	2	2	5	7	12
1943–44	Portland Oilers	PCHL	—	—	—	—	—	4	7	1	8	2
1944–45	Seattle Stars	PCHL	—	—	—	—	—	—	—	—	—	—
PCHL totals			303	139	119	258	368	23	13	3	16	18
NHL totals			11	0	1	1	2	—	—	—	—	—
