= Percy Jackson (ice hockey) =

Canadian ice hockey player

- Born: November 21, 1906; Canmore, Alberta, Canada
- Died: September 16, 1972 (aged 65)
- Height: 5 ft 8 in (173 cm)
- Weight: 174 lb (79 kg; 12 st 6 lb)
- Position: Goaltender
- Caught: Left
- Played for: Boston Bruins; New York Americans; New York Rangers
- Playing career: 1926–1944

Percival Steele Jackson (November 21, 1906 — September 16, 1972) was a Canadian professional ice hockey goaltender who played seven games in the National Hockey League between 1931 and 1936. Born in Canmore, Alberta, he played with the New York Americans, New York Rangers, and Boston Bruins.

== Career statistics ==
=== Regular season and playoffs ===
			Regular season								Playoffs
Season	Team	League	GP	W	L	T	Min	GA	SO	GAA	GP	W	L	Min	GA	SO	GAA
1926–27	Trail Smoke Eaters	WRHL	—	—	—	—	—	—	—	—	—	—	—	—	—	—	—
1927–28	Trail Smoke Eaters	WRHL	—	—	—	—	—	—	—	—	—	—	—	—	—	—	—
1928–29	Vancouver Lions	PCHL	35	25	7	3	2160	51	11	1.42	3	3	0	180	3	1	1.00
1929–30	Vancouver Lions	PCHL	36	20	8	8	2160	46	10	1.28	4	3	1	240	6	0	1.50
1930–31	Vancouver Lions	PCHL	34	14	12	8	2040	56	7	1.65	4	3	1	240	7	2	1.75
1931–32	Boston Bruins	NHL	4	1	1	1	230	8	0	2.09	—	—	—	—	—	—	—
1931–32	Boston Cubs	Can-Am	25	14	9	2	1540	62	2	2.42	5	1	4	300	15	0	3.00
1932–33	Boston Cubs	Can-Am	45	21	16	8	2800	105	2	2.25	7	5	2	420	14	0	2.00
1933–34	Boston Cubs	Can-Am	41	18	16	7	2460	100	4	2.44	5	2	3	300	13	0	2.60
1933–34	New York Americans	NHL	1	0	1	0	60	9	0	9.00	—	—	—	—	—	—	—
1934–35	New York Rangers	NHL	1	0	1	0	60	8	0	8.00	—	—	—	—	—	—	—
1934–35	Providence Reds	Can-Am	1	1	0	0	60	2	0	2.00	—	—	—	—	—	—	—
1934–35	Boston Cubs	Can-Am	39	24	10	5	2340	105	1	2.69	3	3	0	180	2	1	0.67
1935–36	Boston Bruins	NHL	1	0	0	0	40	1	0	1.50	—	—	—	—	—	—	—
1935–36	Boston Cubs	Can-Am	46	20	22	4	2840	129	0	2.73	—	—	—	—	—	—	—
1935–36	Philadelphia Ramblers	Can-Am	1	0	1	0	60	6	0	6.00	—	—	—	—	—	—	—
1936–37	Vancouver Lions	PCHL	40	—	—	—	2400	105	3	2.62	3	1	2	180	6	0	2.00
1937–38	Vancouver Lions	PCHL	42	19	18	5	2580	91	5	2.12	6	4	2	374	8	2	1.28
1938–39	Vancouver Lions	PCHL	48	15	24	9	2880	195	0	4.06	2	0	2	120	10	0	5.00
1939–40	Vancouver Lions	PCHL	40	22	16	2	2400	125	1	3.12	5	4	1	300	12	0	2.40
1940–41	Portland Buckaroos	PCHL	1	1	0	0	60	1	0	1.00	—	—	—	—	—	—	—
1940–41	Vancouver Lions	PCHL	48	22	21	5	2880	145	3	3.02	6	5	1	360	11	1	1.83
1941–42	Tulsa Oilers	AHA	50	13	34	3	3010	188	1	3.75	2	0	2	120	9	0	4.50
1942–43	Vancouver St. Regis	PCHL	3	—	—	—	180	14	0	4.67	5	—	—	300	18	0	3.60
1943–44	Vancouver St. Regis	NWIHL	24	—	—	—	1440	142	0	5.92	3	0	3	180	24	0	8.00
1943–44	Vancouver RCAF Seahawks	NNDHL	3	2	1	0	180	19	0	6.33	—	—	—	—	—	—	—
1943–44	Vancouver Maple Leafs	NNDHL	2	1	1	0	120	12	0	6.00	4	3	1	240	22	0	5.50
NHL totals			7	1	3	1	390	26	0	4.00	—	—	—	—	—	—	—
