= Harry Glickman =

American basketball executive (1924–2020)

Harry Glickman

Harry Glickman (May 13, 1924 – June 10, 2020) was an American journalist, promoter, and sports executive. He was one of the founders of the Portland Trail Blazers, and the team's president from 1987 to 1994.

== Early life and career ==
Glickman grew up in Portland, Oregon during the Great Depression, the son of Polish Jewish immigrant Bessie, who worked in the ladies' garment industry. Glickman also had a job as a paperboy. Bessie would trade letters in Yiddish with her family in Wysokie until 1939, when the Nazis invaded the country, and sent Glickman's relatives to the Treblinka extermination camp. Glickman played basketball at Lincoln High School, where he graduated in 1941.

Afterwards Glickman enrolled at the University of Oregon, from which he graduated in 1948 with a degree in journalism. He had plans to become a sportswriter, and served as the campus correspondent for The Oregonian, the director of the university’s athletic news bureau, and wrote for the school paper as well as The Register-Guard. Glickman left college to enlist for World War II, spending three years at the 12th Armored Division of the 7th Army. After returning to Oregon, he graduated in 1948. While a student at Oregon, he became a member of the Sigma Alpha Mu fraternity (he was president of the fraternity in his senior year) and an editor of the alumni magazine, Old Oregon. When a job offer at The Oregonian fell through, Glickman took to promoting sporting events.

Opening a company named Oregon Sports Attractions, Glickman began with boxing matches, and branched off into show business events. In 1955, he promoted a Pacific Northwest tour for Judy Garland, but once she refused to appear on stage for the last concert in Spokane, Washington, Glickman got so irritated he swore to only work with sports. Afterwards, Glickman's achievements included preseason games for National Football League teams at Portland’s Multnomah Stadium, games by the Harlem Globetrotters and post-season NBA All-Star games at the newly opened Memorial Coliseum.

In 1960, he was the founder of the Portland Buckaroos of the Western Hockey League, a now-defunct minor hockey league (and one of several leagues to bear that name). The Buckaroos were one of the most successful franchises in minor league hockey history, winning three WHL championships, and playing in three others, during their 13 years in the Western Hockey League. The WHL would fold in 1974, largely as a result of losing major market teams in Los Angeles and Vancouver to the National Hockey League (NHL) and others, including Denver and Phoenix, to the World Hockey Association (which later merged with the NHL). The Buckaroos ultimately folded in 1975, after moving to a different league.

== Portland Trail Blazers ==
Glickman was interested in creating a basketball team in Portland as soon as a bond for the Memorial Coliseum was passed in 1954. While the NBA refused his offer, in 1959 Glickman negotiated with Abe Saperstein to have a team on his American Basketball League, but the league folded before he could do so. In 1970, Glickman, working without any investor support, won an expansion franchise with the National Basketball Association, subject to coming up with $3.8 million in a matter of days. Glickman soon rounded up 3 wealthy real estate developers led by Herman Sarkowsky of Seattle, who then brought in Larry Weinberg of Los Angeles and Robert Schmertz of New Jersey. Later, Sarkowsky and Schmertz sold their shares to Weinberg, who was the team's majority owner until the club was sold to Paul Allen in 1988. Glickman oversaw all business and basketball operations as the General Manager of the Portland Trail Blazers franchise from its inception in 1970 until his retirement in 1987 and continued as the Blazers' president emeritus. After Paul Allen bought the club, Glickman's son’s Marshall who was promoted to Senior Vice-President and Daniel who remains employed by the Blazers as chief criminal litigator and consultant, both still remain close to the team.

After his Blazer career, Glickman served his son’s Marshall & Daniel at Portland Family Entertainment, a business venture which promotes baseball and soccer in Portland, and which managed a $38 million renovation of 21,000-seat Civic Stadium (now Providence Park) on behalf of the City of Portland.

In 1977, Glickman authored his autobiography Promoter Ain't a Dirty Word. He was inducted into the Oregon Sports Hall of Fame in 1986 for his contribution to sports in Oregon. He was cited as Portland, Oregon's First Citizen of the Year in 1992.

On February 15, 2019, Glickman was named as one of two 2019 recipients of the John Bunn Award (with Del Harris), awarded by the Naismith Memorial Basketball Hall of Fame as a lifetime achievement honor for those "whose outstanding accomplishments have impacted the high school, college, professional and/or the international game."

== Death ==
On June 10, 2020, Glickman died at the age of 96.

Preceded by franchise created	Portland Trail Blazers General Manager; 1970–1981	Succeeded by Stu Inman
Preceded by Larry Weinberg	Portland Trail Blazers President; 1987–1994	Succeeded by Marshall Glickman
