= Seattle Ice Arena =

Demolished sports venue in Seattle, Washington

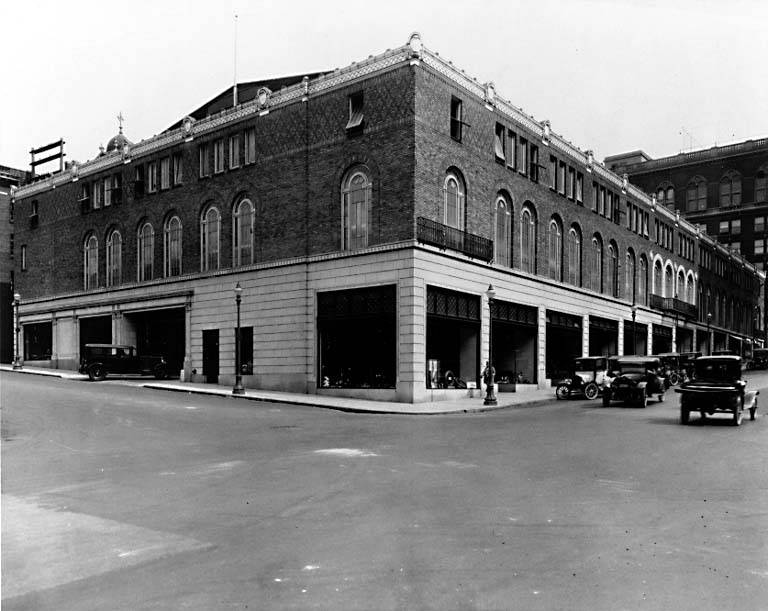
- The Ice Arena circa 1930
- Interactive map of Seattle Ice Arena
- Address: 1200 Fifth Avenue; Seattle, Washington, U.S.
- Coordinates: 47.6084°N 122.3329°W
- Capacity: 4,000
- Type: Sports arena
- Event: Hockey
- Surface: Ice rink
- Field size: 200 ft × 80 ft (61 m × 24 m)

Construction
- Built: 1915
- Closed: 1924
- Demolished: 1963
- Cost: $100,000 (1915)

Tenants
- Seattle Metropolitans (PCHL) (1915–1924); Seattle Vamps (ILHL) (1921)

The Seattle Ice Arena was a 4,000-seat multi-purpose arena in Seattle, Washington, United States. It was home to the Seattle Metropolitans franchise of the Pacific Coast Hockey Association from 1915 to 1924, and their affiliated Seattle Vamps of the International Ladies' Hockey League in 1921.

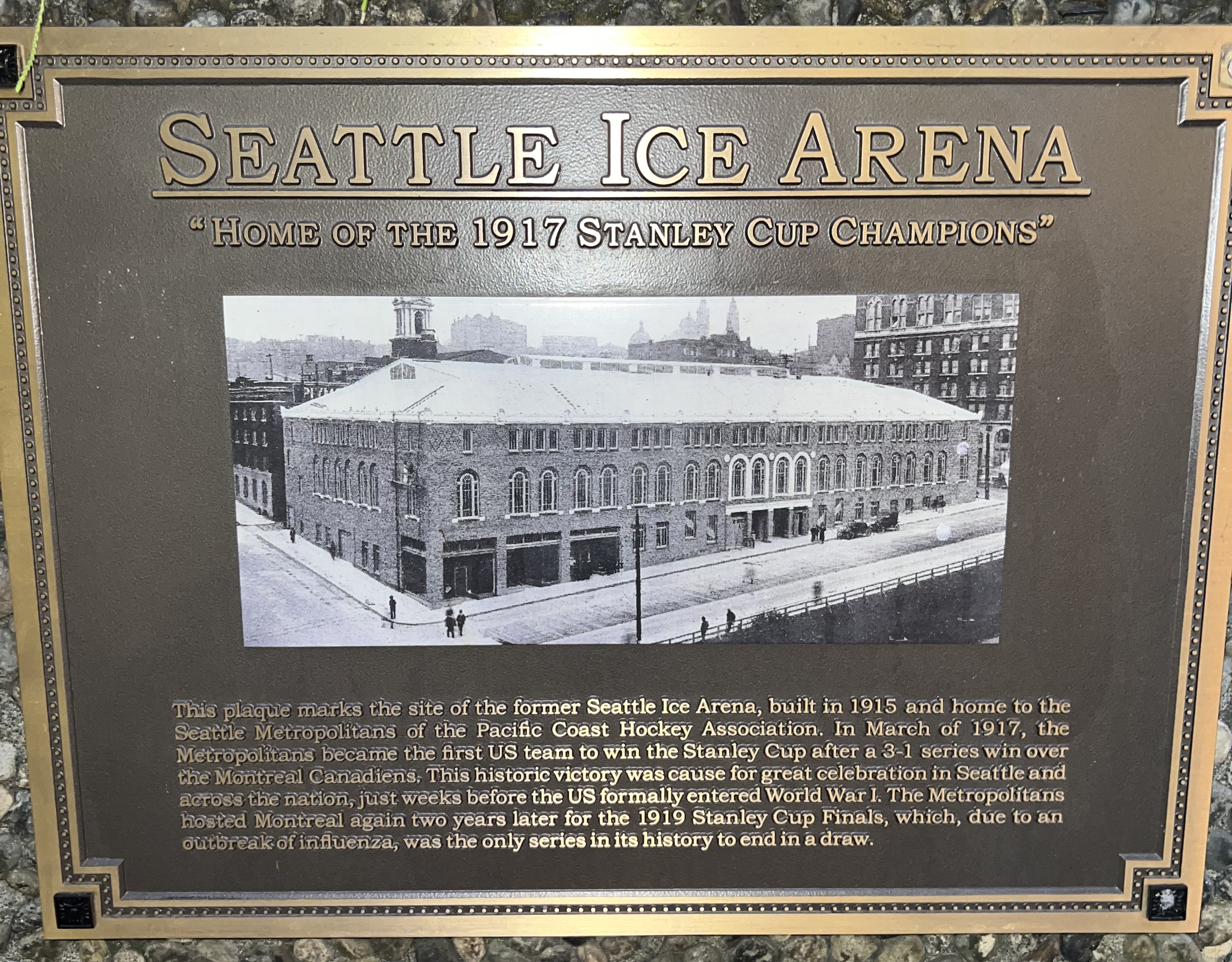
Plaque commemorating the Seattle Ice Arena at its former location.

Built in 1915 at the cost of $100,000, the Ice Arena was located in downtown Seattle east of what is now the Olympic Hotel on University Street. It was developed as part of the University of Washington-owned University Tract by the Metropolitan Building Company, and was designed in a style compatible to other buildings nearby. On March 26, 1917, the Metropolitans defeated the Montreal Canadiens at the arena, becoming the first American team to win the Stanley Cup. The arena was briefly a roller rink and was remodeled into a parking garage for the Olympic Hotel shortly after the 1923-24 season. It was torn down in 1963 to make way for the IBM Building.

== See also ==
- Mercer Arena

Preceded by None - new building	Home of the Seattle Metropolitans; 1915–1924	Succeeded by None - converted to a parking lot
