= 1928–29 PCHL season =

The 1928–29 PCHL season was the first season of the professional men's ice hockey Pacific Coast Hockey League, a minor professional league with teams in the western United States and western Canada. It consisted of four teams: Vancouver Lions, Seattle Eskimos, Portland Buckaroos and Victoria Cubs.

It was followed by the 1929–30 PCHL season.

The season ran 36 games and the two best teams in the league standings met in a best-of-five playoff format series for league championship honors.

== Teams ==
1928–29 Pacific Coast Hockey League
Team	City	Arena	Capacity
Portland Buckaroos	Portland, Oregon	Portland Ice Arena	2,000
Seattle Eskimos	Seattle, Washington	Civic Ice Arena	4,000
Vancouver Lions	Vancouver, British Columbia	Denman Arena	10,500
Victoria Cubs	Victoria, British Columbia	Patrick Arena	4,000

=== Map of teams ===
PCHL Teams

== Final standings ==
Note: W = Wins, L = Losses, T = Ties, GF= Goals For, GA = Goals Against
Teams that qualified for the playoffs are highlighted in bold

Pacific Coast Hockey League	GP	W	L	T	GF	GA
**Vancouver Lions**	36	25	8	3	87	54
**Seattle Eskimos**	36	17	17	2	75	76
Portland Buckaroos	36	14	17	5	66	71
Victoria Cubs	36	8	22	6	60	87

== Playoffs ==
Vancouver Lions defeated Seattle Eskimos 3 games to 0 (2-0, 3–1, 4-2).
