= Curse of Muldoon =

Alleged curse on the Chicago Black Hawks

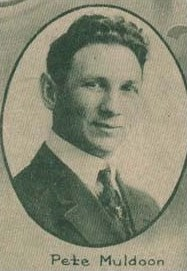
Pete Muldoon, the namesake of the curse

The Curse of Muldoon, named after Pete Muldoon, was a sports-related curse that supposedly prevented the Chicago Black Hawks of the National Hockey League from finishing in first place between 1927 and 1967.

== History ==
The Chicago Black Hawks first season in the NHL (1926–27) was a moderate success, with the forward line of Mickey MacKay, Babe Dye, and Dick Irvin each finishing near the top of the league's scoring race. However, they lost their first-round playoff series to the Boston Bruins. Following this series, team owner Frederic McLaughlin fired head coach Pete Muldoon.

In the 1950s, sportswriter Jim Coleman wrote a fabled story alleging a curse had been placed upon the Blackhawks by Muldoon upon his firing. He had come up with this idea to meet his publishing deadline and to prove to Ralph Adams that "sports fans were so gullible they would believe anything." He wrote that McLaughlin felt that the Black Hawks were good enough to finish first in the American Division. Muldoon disagreed, and McLaughlin fired him. Muldoon supposedly responded, "Fire me, Major, and you'll never finish first. I'll put a curse on this team that will hoodoo it until the end of time." In 1992, the National Hockey League erroneously published that the curse was created by Coleman in 1941.

While the team would win the Stanley Cup in 1934 (defeating the Detroit Red Wings in the Finals), 1938 (defeating the Toronto Maple Leafs) and 1961 (again defeating the Red Wings), they would do so without having finished in first place either in a multi-division or a single-league format. The fabled "curse" was broken in 1967 upon the Hawks finishing first in the league.
