= Pete Muldoon =

Canadian ice hockey player, coach (1887–1929)

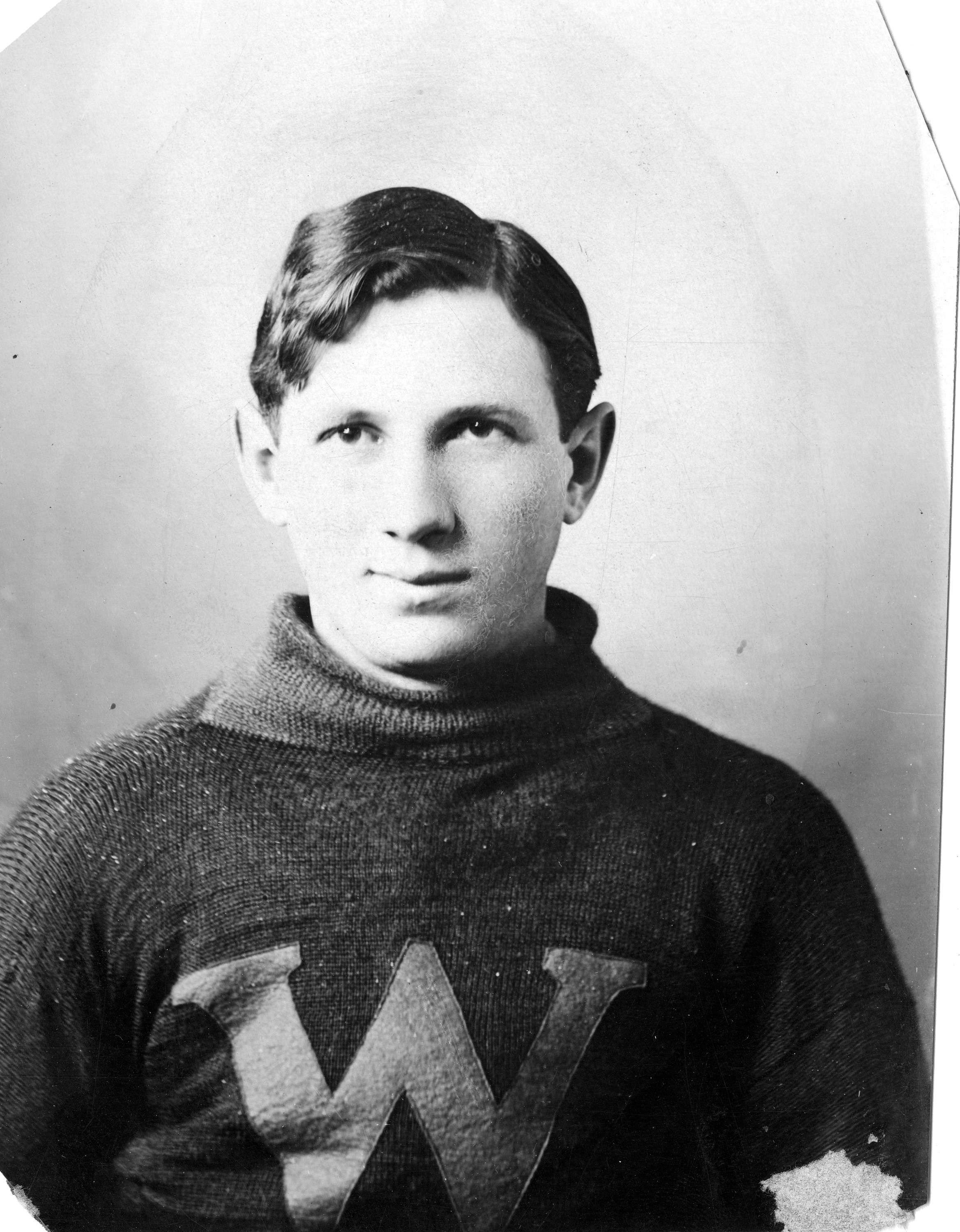
- Muldoon as a trainer with the 1912 New Westminster Royals
- Born: Linton Muldoon Treacy; June 4, 1887; St. Marys, Ontario, Canada
- Died: March 13, 1929 (aged 41); Tacoma, Washington, U.S.
- Occupation: Ice hockey coach

Linton Muldoon Treacy (June 4, 1887 – March 13, 1929), better known as Pete Muldoon, was a Canadian ice hockey coach. He was the coach of the Seattle Metropolitans from 1915 to 1924 and led the team to a Stanley Cup championship in 1917. Muldoon later became the first coach of the Chicago Black Hawks. He was known for reportedly putting a curse on the Black Hawks after he was fired at the end of the 1926–27 season, although it was later stated to be completely fabricated.

== Early life ==
Muldoon was born in St. Marys, Ontario, as Linton Muldoon Treacy. He played hockey in the Ontario Hockey Association in the 1900s before moving to the Pacific coast in order to pursue a boxing career. He changed his name to Pete Muldoon because the pursuit of a professional sports career was discouraged in Ontario at the time. Muldoon won regional titles in both the middleweight and light heavyweight divisions while boxing.

== Ice hockey career ==
Muldoon was accomplished at other sports, including lacrosse. He played professionally for a Vancouver club in 1911. He was also an ice dancer who was able to skate, as well as play hockey, while on stilts. In 1914, he took over as the coach and manager of the Portland Rosebuds. For the 1915 season, he changed teams, and went to Seattle to manage a new team in the PCHA, the Seattle Metropolitans. He spent eight seasons coaching in Seattle and amassed a record of 115 wins, 105 losses, and four ties. The Mets played for the Stanley Cup three times under his leadership, winning it once in 1917 during their first trip. Muldoon was the first and, at age 30, youngest coach of a Stanley Cup Championship team based in the United States.

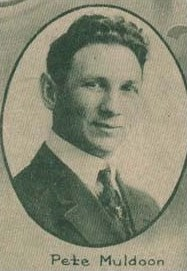
Muldoon with the Seattle Metropolitans

In 1919, the Metropolitans made it to the finals for the second time in three years, this time against the Montreal Canadiens. The series was to have been a five-game series, but the fourth game ended in a scoreless draw. However, local health officials called off the deciding sixth game just hours before it was due to start when several players on both teams were stricken by Spanish flu. With virtually his entire team either hospitalized or confined to bed and efforts to find replacements vetoed by the PCHA, Canadiens owner George Kennedy announced he was forfeiting the game—and the Cup—to Seattle. However, Muldoon felt it would be unsportsmanlike to accept what would have been his second Cup, seeing as it would have been at the expense of a team decimated by illness. Seattle lost in the Stanley Cup Final the next year against the Ottawa Senators.

Muldoon returned to the Rosebuds after the Metropolitans folded in the spring of 1924. He followed most of his players to the National Hockey League when most of the Rosebuds were sold to Major Frederic McLaughlin to start the Chicago Black Hawks. He accepted the position because his wife Dorothy was a Chicago native and pregnant with the family's second child. After the Black Hawks ended the 1926–27 season with a playoff berth after finishing in third place in the American Division with a 19–22–3 record, he resigned because of constant meddling from McLaughlin.

Muldoon returned to Seattle and became involved in efforts to bring a professional team back to the city, as a new arena was constructed in 1928. Muldoon, with the help of a group of investors, established the Seattle Ice Skating and Hockey Association, while aiding to establish the PCHL. This new league had its first season in 1928, and the Seattle team was dubbed the Seattle Eskimos.

== Death ==
In the spring of 1929, Muldoon went to Tacoma, Washington, with co-owner and local boxing promoter Nate Druxman to search for a location to build a new rink in order to establish a team. While in Tacoma, on March 13, 1929, Muldoon died from a heart attack. Without their coach, the Seattle Eskimos were able to win a playoff series against Portland before losing to Vancouver in the league finals. The following season the Eskimos established the Pete Muldoon Trophy, presented to the player "deemed most inspirational by his teammates". It was awarded for a few seasons and disappeared from records during the Great Depression years.

== Legacy ==
Journalist Jim Coleman ascribed the Black Hawks' "Curse of Muldoon" to the former coach. The team's owner reportedly felt that the team should have won the American Division in their first season. He fired Muldoon when the coach disagreed. Coleman wrote that Muldoon placed an Irish curse on the Hawks, saying, "Fire me, Major, and you'll never finish first. I'll put a curse on this team that will hoodoo it until the end of time." The Hawks would not finish first in any format (despite winning three Stanley Cups) until 1966–67, their 41st year in the league. Coleman admitted to inventing the "curse" due to a bout of writer's block in 1943 when he needed to meet a publishing deadline. Other sources maintain that "41 years is plenty long enough for any 'curse,' real or imagined".

The Seattle Kraken, Seattle’s first NHL team, named their team's annual Most Valuable Player award the "Pete Muldoon Award".

== Coaching record ==
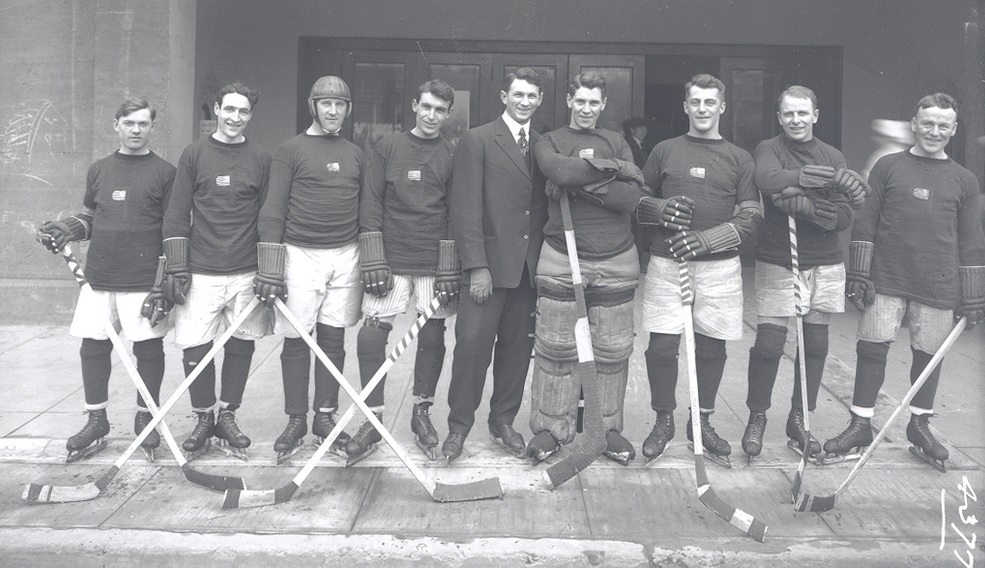
Muldoon (center) with the 1914–15 Portland Rosebuds

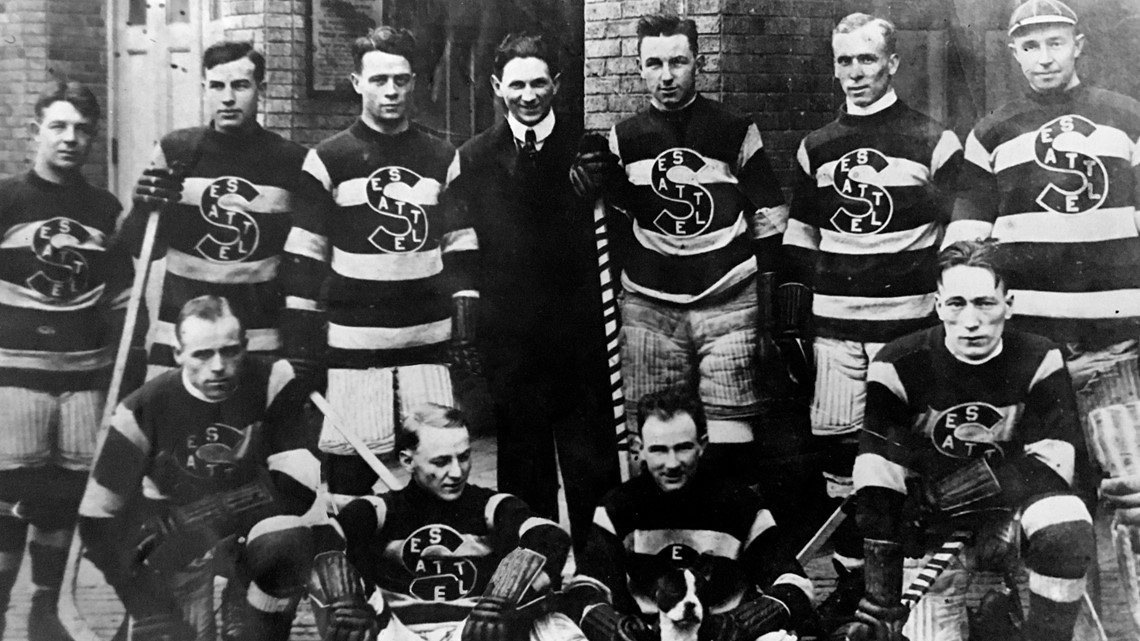
Muldoon (back row, center) with the 1916–17 Seattle Metropolitans

Season	Team	League	Regular season						Playoffs
Season	Team	League	GP	W	L	T	Pts	Result	Result
1913–14	New Westminster Royals	PCHA	16	7	9	0	14	2nd	–
1914–15	Portland Rosebuds	PCHA	18	9	9	0	18	2nd	–
1915–16	Seattle Metropolitans	PCHA	18	9	9	0	18	2nd	–
1916–17	Seattle Metropolitans	PCHA	24	16	8	0	32	1st	Won Stanley Cup (3-1 vs. MTL)
1917–18	Portland Rosebuds	PCHA	18	7	11	0	14	3rd	–
1919	Seattle Metropolitans	PCHA	20	11	9	0	22	2nd	Won league playoff (7-5 vs. VAN); Stanley Cup Final vs. MTL canceled by Spanish flu
1919–20	Seattle Metropolitans	PCHA	22	12	10	0	24	1st	Won league playoff (6-3 vs. VAN); Lost in Stanley Cup Final (2-3 vs. OTT)
1920–21	Seattle Metropolitans	PCHA	24	12	11	1	25	2nd	Lost in league playoff (2-13 vs. VAN)
1921–22	Seattle Metropolitans	PCHA	24	12	11	1	25	1st	Lost in league playoff (0-2 vs. VAN)
1922–23	Seattle Metropolitans	PCHA	30	15	15	0	30	3rd	–
1923–24	Seattle Metropolitans	PCHA	30	14	16	0	28	1st	Lost in league playoff (3-4 vs. VAN)
1925–26	Portland Rosebuds	WHL	30	12	16	2	26	4th	–
1926–27	Chicago Black Hawks	NHL	44	19	22	3	41	3rd in American	Lost in first round (5-10 vs. BOS)
PCHA total			244	124	118	2	250		
NHL total			44	19	22	3	41		

Preceded by Position created	Head coach of the Chicago Black Hawks; 1926–27	Succeeded by Barney Stanley
