= Eddie Carpenter =

Canadian ice hockey player

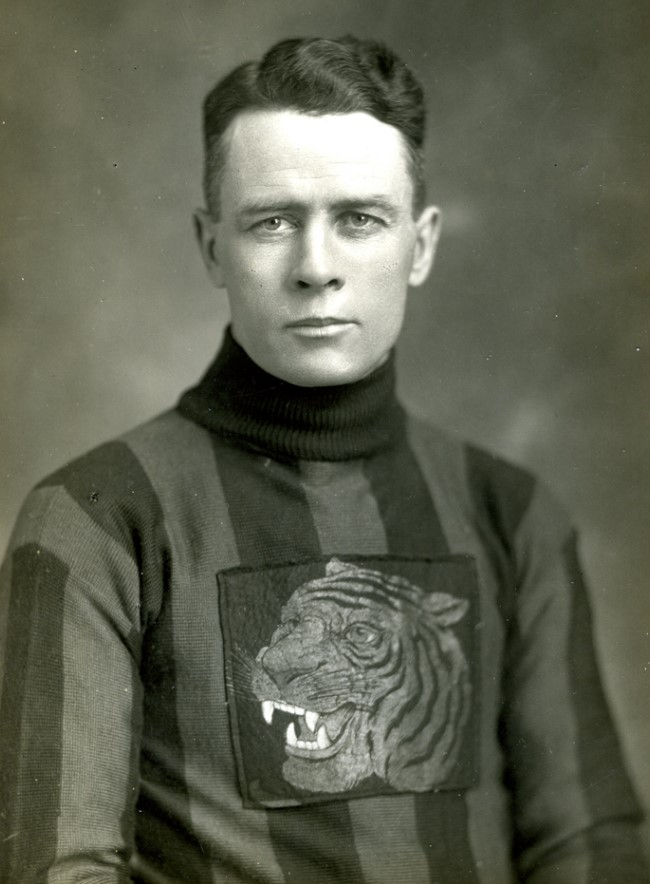
- Carpenter in 1920
- Born: June 15, 1890 Hartford, Michigan, USA
- Died: April 30, 1963 (aged 72) Winnipeg, Manitoba, Canada
- Height: 6 ft 0 in (183 cm)
- Weight: 170 lb (77 kg; 12 st 2 lb)
- Position: Defence
- Shot: Right
- Played for: Port Arthur Thunderbays (NOHL); Port Arthur Lake City (NOHL); Moncton Victorias (MPHL); New Glasgow Black Foxes (MPHL); Toronto Blueshirts (NHA); Seattle Metropolitans (PCHA); Quebec Bulldogs (NHL); Hamilton Tigers (NHL)
- Playing career: 1909–1921

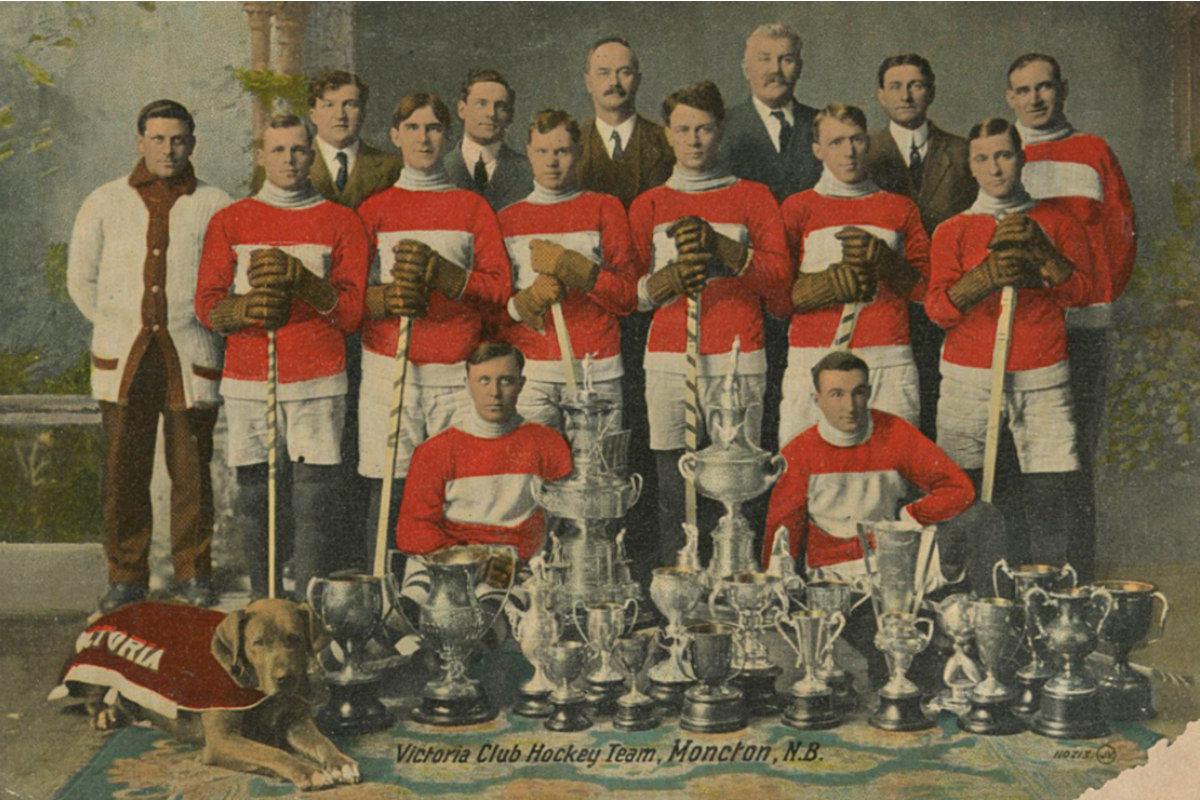
Carpenter, third from right in the middle row, with the Moncton Victorias in 1912–13.

Everard Lorne Carpenter (June 15, 1890 – April 30, 1963) was a Canadian ice hockey player. He played in the Maritime Professional Hockey League (MPHL), National Hockey Association (NHA), National Hockey League (NHL), and Pacific Coast Hockey Association (PCHA) in a career that lasted from 1909 to 1921. With the Seattle Metropolitans of the PCHA he won the Stanley Cup in 1917, and he played for the Cup in 1911 with Port Arthur.

== Career ==
Although born in Hartford, Michigan, Carpenter grew up in the Lachute-Brownsburg, Quebec, area where his parents lived until they moved to Red Deer, Alberta, in 1913.

Carpenter moved to Port Arthur, Ontario, in 1909 to work for the Canadian Northern Railway. He played the defensive position of cover point with the semi-professional Thunder Bay Hockey Club in 1910, then during the hockey seasons of 1910–11 and 1911–12 for the Port Arthur Hockey Club. The team (which included Jack Walker) defeated Prince Albert for the Western Canadian championship, then went on to play the Ottawa Senators on March 16, 1911, for the Stanley Cup; they were defeated by the NHA team.

Carpenter played for the Moncton Victorias in the 1912–13 season and the New Glasgow Black Foxes in 1913–14. He then joined the Stanley Cup champion Toronto Blueshirts of the NHA for one season. He left the Blueshirts and joined the new Seattle Metropolitans, helping the team win the Stanley Cup in 1917. After two seasons in Seattle, Carpenter returned to Port Arthur for one season before serving in World War I. He returned from the war in 1919 and joined the Quebec Bulldogs of the NHL, following the club to Hamilton the next season, where it was known as the Hamilton Tigers.

After retiring from professional hockey in 1921, Carpenter became the trainer, coach, and manager for the Port Arthur Hockey Club which won two Allan Cups in 1924–25 and 1925–26. He served as councillor of the city of Port Arthur in 1941. Around 1945, he moved to Winnipeg, and in approximately 1954, he retired from his job as a locomotive engineer, having worked for the Canadian National Railways. He died in Winnipeg in 1963.

== Career statistics ==
=== Regular season and playoffs ===
			Regular season					Playoffs
Season	Team	League	GP	G	A	Pts	PIM	GP	G	A	Pts	PIM
1909–10	Port Arthur Thunder Bays	NOHL	13	2	0	2	51	—	—	—	—	—
1910–11	Port Arthur Lake City	NOHL	14	6	0	6	54	2	0	0	0	18
1910–11	Port Arthur Lake City	St-Cup	—	—	—	—	—	1	1	0	1	0
1911–12	Port Arthur Lake City	NOHL	15	2	0	2	39	2	0	0	0	3
1912–13	Moncton Victorias	MPHL	14	6	0	6	17	—	—	—	—	—
1913–14	New Glasgow Black Foxes	MPHL	19	8	0	8	37	2	0	0	0	7
1914–15	Toronto Blueshirts	NHA	19	1	0	1	63	—	—	—	—	—
1915–16	Seattle Metropolitans	PCHA	18	6	4	10	17	—	—	—	—	—
1916–17	Seattle Metropolitans	PCHA	24	5	3	8	19	—	—	—	—	—
1916–17	Seattle Metropolitans	St-Cup	—	—	—	—	—	4	0	0	0	3
1919–20	Quebec Bulldogs	NHL	24	8	4	12	24	—	—	—	—	—
1920–21	Hamilton Tigers	NHL	21	2	1	3	17	—	—	—	—	—
NHA totals			19	1	0	1	63	—	—	—	—	—
NHL totals			45	10	5	15	41	—	—	—	—	—

Source: NHL
