= Seattle Metropolitans =

Former ice hockey team in the United States

- City: Seattle, Washington
- League: PCHA
- Founded: 1915
- Folded: 1924
- Home arena: Seattle Ice Arena
- Colors: Green, red, white
- Head coach: Pete Muldoon

Championships
- Regular season titles: 5 (1917, 1918, 1920, 1922, 1924)
- Stanley Cups: 1 (1917)
- Playoff championships: 3 (1917, 1919, 1920)

The Seattle Metropolitans were a professional ice hockey team based in Seattle, playing in the Pacific Coast Hockey Association (PCHA) from 1915 to 1924. During their nine seasons, the Metropolitans were the PCHA's most successful franchise, as they went 112–96–2 in their nine years as a franchise (outpacing the next best team in the Vancouver Millionaires, who went 109–97–2 during that same period). The Metropolitans also won the most regular season PCHA championships, winning five times (while Vancouver won four), with Seattle finishing second on three other occasions. The Metropolitans played their home games at the 2,500 seat Seattle Ice Arena located downtown at 5th and University.

The Metropolitans made seven postseason appearances in their nine seasons. The team won the Stanley Cup in 1917, tied for the Cup in 1919 and lost in five games in 1920. The story of the Metropolitans' 1917 championship, which made Seattle the first American team to win the Cup, was chronicled in the book When It Mattered Most. Seattle's Stanley Cup championship occurred 11 years before the New York Rangers became the National Hockey League's first American franchise to win the Cup in 1928.

The Metropolitans folded in 1924 when a replacement for the Seattle Ice Arena could not be found. Seattle's next team eligible to win the Stanley Cup, the NHL expansion Seattle Kraken, began play in 2021, and have honored the Metropolitans in various ways since.

== History ==
The Metropolitans were formed in 1915 as an expansion team by Frank and Lester Patrick, the owners of the Pacific Coast Hockey Association. The team's name was derived from the Metropolitan Building Company, the entity that built the Seattle Ice Arena on the University of Washington's Metropolitan Tract property.

A long simmering player war between the NHA and PCHA exploded once again in 1915 when the Patricks caught the Ottawa Senators trying to poach Vancouver's best player, Cyclone Taylor. In response, the Patricks raided the Toronto Blueshirts, signing Eddie Carpenter, Frank Foyston, Hap Holmes, Jack Walker and Cully Wilson for the Metropolitans. The Blueshirts had won the Stanley Cup in 1914 and this immediately provided Seattle with a competitive squad. To complete the roster, Pete Muldoon signed forward Bobby Rowe and offered a tryout to center Bernie Morris who had both been reserves the previous season in Victoria and cut by the team that summer. Muldoon immediately moved Rowe to defense, where he thrived, and Morris quickly made the team, scoring the game-winning goal in the Metropolitans' first game and eventually becoming a 5-time PCHA All-Star. Roy Rickey was signed a few weeks into the inaugural season after he was released by Vancouver. The Metropolitans signed Jim Riley just prior to the 1916–17 season after he, too, was cut by Victoria.

In an era of one-year contracts and rampant player movement, the Metropolitans roster remained relatively stable. With a typical roster of nine skaters, the Metropolitans had seven players spend seven or more seasons in Seattle. Foyston, Walker and Rowe played all nine campaigns while Morris, Holmes and Rickey spent eight years with the Metropolitans and Jim Riley seven, missing 1918 while serving overseas in World War I.

The team's official scorer was Royal Brougham, who covered the Metropolitans, Sonics, Seahawks and Mariners during his 68-year career at the Seattle Post-Intelligencer.

=== First U.S. Stanley Cup ===
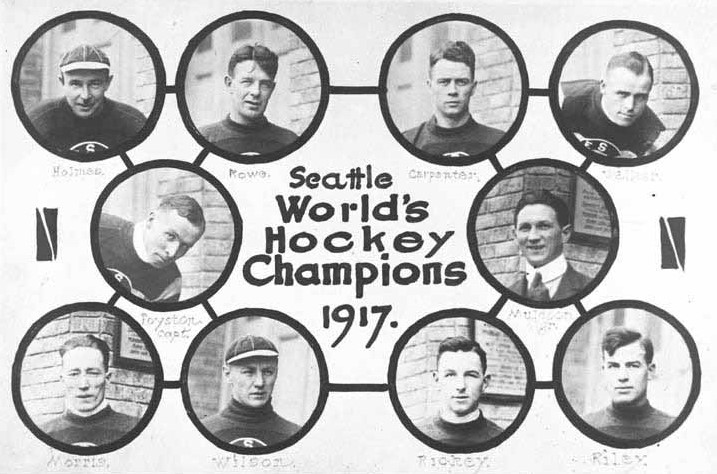
Seattle Metropolitans Stanley Cup winning team in 1917. Top row: Harry "Hap" Holmes, Bobby Rowe, Eddie Carpenter, Jack Walker; Middle: Frank Foyston, Pete Muldoon (head coach); Bottom: Bernie Morris, Cully Wilson, Roy Rickey, Jim Riley.

Seattle won the 1917 championship by defeating the National Hockey Association's Montreal Canadiens three games to one by a combined score of 23–11. The heavily favored Canadiens trounced the Metropolitans in Game 1, despite arriving in Seattle the same morning. The Metropolitans would storm back to win Games 2, 3, and 4, outscoring Montreal 19–3. Fourteen of Seattle's goals were scored by Bernie Morris (including six in Game 4 alone). Games 1 and 3 were played under PCHA rules, including seven players per side, forward passing in the neutral zone, and no substitution for penalized players. Games 2 and 4 were played under NHA rules, including six players per side, no forward passing, and substitutions allowed.

=== Later years ===
After winning the 1917 Stanley Cup, the Metropolitans also played in the Stanley Cup Final in 1919 (which was cancelled due to the Spanish flu pandemic after five games, with the series tied 2–2–1) and 1920, when they lost to the Ottawa Senators.

The day the 1919 playoffs began, star center Bernie Morris was arrested and jailed at Fort Lewis for draft evasion, despite being a Canadian citizen. Without their best scorer, the Metropolitans still defeated the Vancouver Millionaires in the PCHA championship series and jumped out to a 2-1 lead through Game three of the Stanley Cup Final, outscoring Montreal 16–6 as Seattle's best player, Frank Foyston, scored eight goals. Game 4 of the 1919 Stanley Cup Final resulted in a scoreless tie after two overtime periods. The Metropolitans' Cully Wilson netted the lone puck on the night only to have it waved off by referee Mickey Ion, who ruled that time had expired before the goal scored. The Metropolitans jumped out to a 4–1 lead in the third period of Game 5 before exhaustion consumed the short-handed Metropolitans. Montreal scored three goals in the final period to tie the game and force a second consecutive overtime match. With Frank Foyston injured in the period and Jack Walker out with a broken skate, Cully Wilson collapsed on the ice as the Canadiens scored the game winner to send the series to an unprecedented sixth game. The next morning, the Spanish flu pandemic struck the two teams, ultimately killing Montreal's Joe Hall. Four other Canadiens were hospitalized, and five others were confined to bed. Without enough healthy players to field a team, Montreal offered to forfeit the Cup to the Metropolitans. Muldoon was unwilling to accept the Cup under those circumstances, and asked permission for the Canadiens to substitute players from the PCHA's last-place team, the Victoria Aristocrats. However, PCHA president Patrick refused, and the series was canceled.

During the 1920 Stanley Cup Final, the Ottawa Senators wore solid white uniforms to avoid confusion with Seattle's barber pole style of green, red and white. Games 4 and 5 of the series were relocated to Toronto's Mutual Street Arena because Ottawa's arena did not have acceptable ice.

The PCHA consisted of four teams for the 1915–16 and 1916–17 seasons, while operating under only three teams from 1917–18 until its final season in 1923–24. From 1922–23, games against the Western Canada Hockey League (WCHL) counted in the PCHA standings. This allowed Seattle to have a losing record yet still win the league regular season championship in 1924.

=== Dissolution of the PCHA ===
After the 1924 season, the owners of the newly built Olympic Hotel told the University of Washington that they needed the Seattle Ice Arena as a parking garage. The university bought out the final year on the team's lease, sending the Metropolitans' leadership scrambling to secure funding to build a new arena. When it became apparent they would not succeed, the franchise folded and the core of the team joined the Victoria Cougars.

With only two teams remaining in the Pacific Coast Hockey Association, they dissolved the league joined the WCHL - renamed to the Western Hockey League (WHL) - for the 1924-1925 season. The WHL itself only played two more seasons before disbanding, with many players' contracts bought out by the rising National Hockey League (NHL) and the remnants forming the short-lived Prairie Hockey League.

Although the Metropolitans franchise never joined the NHL, the league uses the abbreviation SMT to distinguish the Seattle Metropolitans from the later Seattle Kraken (SEA) in Stanley Cup records.

=== Tributes ===
Seattle's later hockey teams have paid tribute to the Metropolitans. The NHL owns the rights to the Metropolitans' trademarks in Canada. Paul Kim, an entrepreneur in Lynnwood, Washington, acquired the trademarks in the U.S. in 2016, after the prior owner abandoned them. Kim had intended to license the trademarks to a future NHL franchise in Seattle.

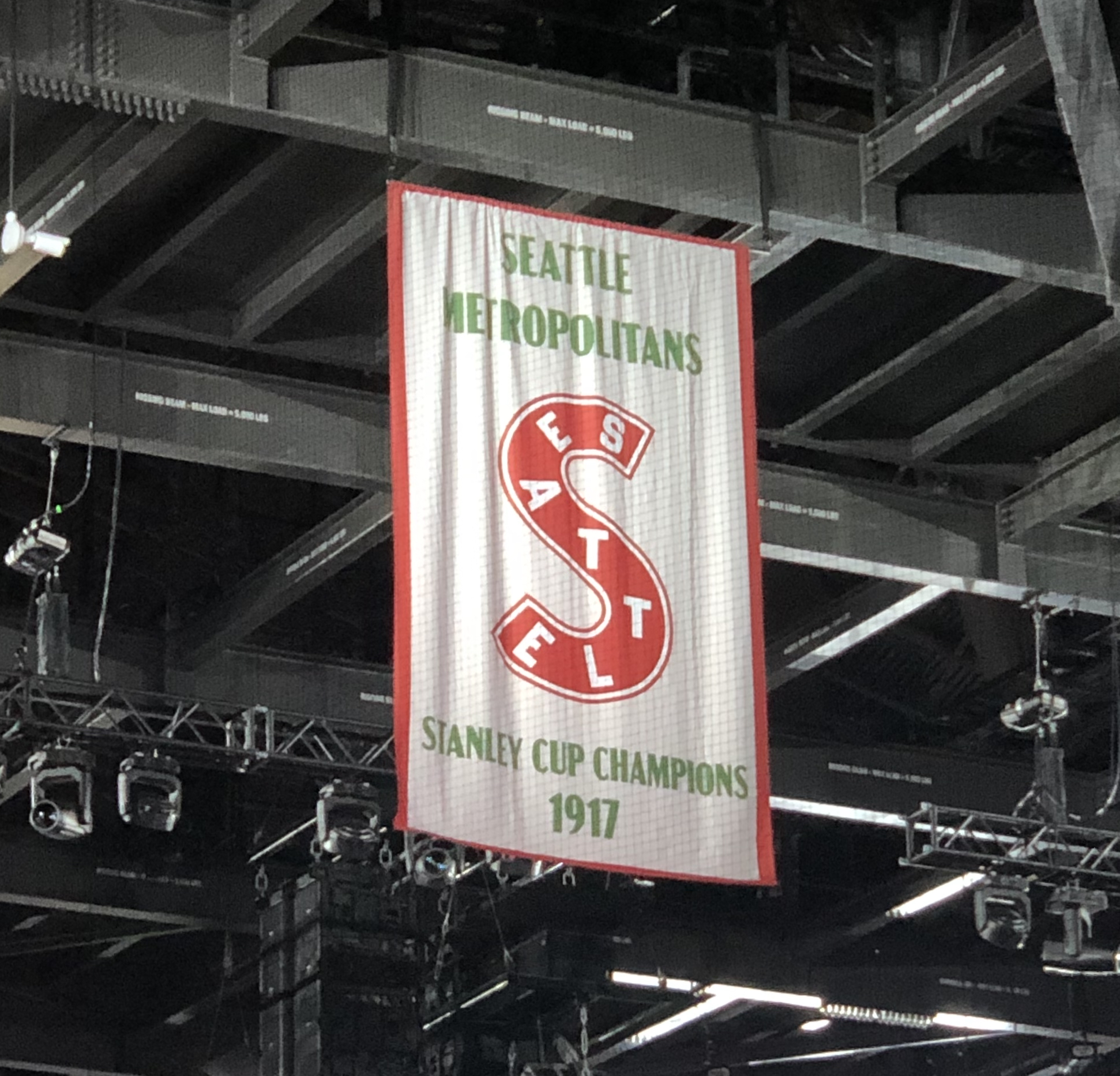
Metropolitans Stanley Cup Banner raised in Climate Pledge Arena

On December 5, 2015, the Seattle Thunderbirds of the Western Hockey League (WHL) held a special "Seattle Metropolitans Night" to celebrate 100 years of Seattle hockey. During the game, the team wore replicas of the original Metropolitans jersey and temporarily changed the team name to the Seattle Metropolitans. The final score was a 3–2 Metropolitans win over the Tri-City Americans.

The Seattle Jr. Totems of the Western States Hockey League named November 15–17, 2019, as "Seattle Hockey History Weekend" and wore the Metropolitans' colors during games.

The "S" logo of the NHL's Seattle Kraken was designed as an homage to the Metropolitans. On October 26, 2021, the Kraken raised a 1917 Stanley Cup Championship banner at Climate Pledge Arena before the team's game against the Canadiens. It was Montreal's first non-exhibition game in Seattle since the 1919 Stanley Cup Final, which were not completed due to the Spanish flu pandemic. The Kraken's uniforms for the 2024 NHL Winter Classic feature a "barber-pole" stripe pattern inspired by the Metropolitans' uniforms.

== Season-by-season record ==
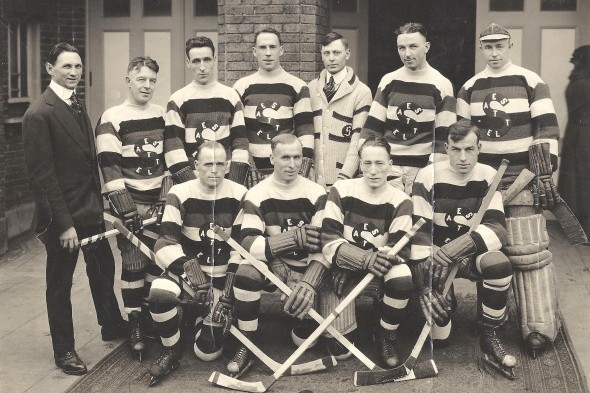
1921 Seattle Metropolitans. Back row: Pete Muldoon, Bobby Rowe, Charles Tobin, Hugh "Muzz" Murray, Trainer Bill Anthony, Roy Rickey, Harry "Hap" Holmes. Front row: Jack Walker, Frank Foyston, Bernie Morris, Jim Riley.

Note: GP = Games played, W = Wins, L = Losses, T = Ties, Pts = Points, GF = Goals for, GA = Goals against

PCHA season	GP	W	L	T	PTS	GF	GA	PIM	League Finish	Playoffs
1915–16	18	9	9	0	18	68	67	--	2nd	N/A
1916–17	24	16	8	0	32	125	80	--	1st	League champions Won Stanley Cup over Montreal Canadiens 3-1
1917–18	18	11	7	0	22	67	65	--	1st	Lost PCHA final to Vancouver Millionaires 3-2
1918–19	20	11	9	0	22	66	46	--	2nd	Won league championship over Vancouver Millionaires 7-5. No decision in Stanley Cup Final with Montreal Canadiens
1919–20	22	12	10	0	24	59	55	--	1st	Won league championship over Vancouver Millionaires 6-3. Lost Stanley Cup Final to Ottawa Senators 3-2
1920–21	24	12	11	1	25	77	68	--	2nd	Lost PCHA final to Vancouver Millionaires 13-2
1921–22	24	12	11	1	25	65	64	--	1st	Lost PCHA final to Vancouver Millionaires 2-0
1922–23	30	15	15	0	30	100	106	--	3rd	Did not qualify
1923–24	30	14	16	0	28	84	99	--	1st	Lost PCHA final to Vancouver Maroons 4-3

== Statistical leaders ==
Games Played
Season	Player	Games	Year	Career	Player	Games	Years played
1	Frank Foyston	30	1923–24	1	Frank Foyston	201	1916–24
	Jack Walker	30	1923–23	2	Bobby Rowe	200	1916–24
	Gordon Fraser	30	1923–24	3	Hap Holmes	192	1916–17, 1919–24
	Hap Holmes	30	1923–24	4	Jack Walker	186	1916–24
	Frank Foyston	30	1922–23	5	Bernie Morris	154	1916–23
	Jack Walker	30	1922–23	6	Jim Riley	153	1917–24
	Bobby Rowe	30	1922–23	7	Roy Rickey	153	1916–23
	Hap Holmes	30	1922–23	8	Gordon Fraser	82	1921–24
9	Smokey Harris	29	1923–24	9	Cully Wilson	68	1916–19
	Jim Riley	29	1922–23	10	Muzz Murray	55	1919–21

Goals Scored
Season	Player	Goals	Year	Career	Player	Goals	Years played
1	Bernie Morris	37	1916–17	1	Frank Foyston	174	1916–24
2	Frank Foyston	36	1916–17	2	Bernie Morris	148	1916–23
3	Frank Foyston	26	1919–20	3	Jim Riley	90	1917–24
	Frank Foyston	26	1920–21	4	Jack Walker	82	1916–24
5	Jim Riley	23	1920–21	5	Cully Wilson	44	1916–19
	Jim Riley	23	1922–23	6	Bobby Rowe	42	1916–24
	Bernie Morris	23	1915–16	7	Gordon Fraser	23	1922–24
8	Bernie Morris	22	1918–19	8	Roy Rickey	21	1916–23
9	Bernie Morris	21	1922–23	9	Doc Roberts	20	1918
10	Frank Foyston	20	1922–23	10	Charlie Tobin	14	1920–21
	Bernie Morris	20	1917–18				
	Doc Roberts	20	1917–18				

Assists
Season	Player	Assists	Year	Career	Player	Assists	Years played
1	Bernie Morris	17	1916–17	1	Bernie Morris	73	1916–23
2	Jack Walker	15	1916–17	2	Jack Walker	57	1916–24
3	Bernie Morris	13	1920–21	3	Frank Foyston	53	1916–24
4	Bernie Morris	12	1917–18	4	Bobby Rowe	37	1916–24
	Frank Foyston	12	1916–17	5	Jim Riley	25	1917–24
6	Bobby Rowe	11	1916–17	6	Cully Wilson	23	1916–19
7	Smokey Harris	10	1923–24	7	Roy Rickey	19	1916–23
	Bernie Morris	10	1921–22	8	Gordon Fraser	11	1922–24
9	Bernie Morris	9	1915–16	9	Smokey Harris	10	1924
10	Jack Walker	8	1922–23	10	Lester Patrick	8	1918
	Frank Foyston	8	1922–23				
	Lester Patrick	8	1917–18				
	Jack Walker	8	1918–19				

Points
Season	Player	Points	Year	Career	Player	Points	Years played
1	Bernie Morris	54	1916–17	1	Frank Foyston	227	1916–24
2	Frank Foyston	36	1916–17	2	Bernie Morris	221	1916–23
3	Bernie Morris	32	1917–18	3	Jack Walker	139	1916–24
	Bernie Morris	32	1915–16	4	Jim Riley	115	1917–24
5	Frank Foyston	31	1920–21	5	Bobby Rowe	79	1916–24
6	Frank Foyston	29	1919–20	6	Cully Wilson	67	1916–19
	Bernie Morris	29	1918–19	7	Roy Rickey	40	1916–23
8	Frank Foyston	28	1922–23	8	Gordon Fraser	34	1922–24
	Jim Riley	28	1920–21	9	Doc Roberts	23	1918
10	Jim Riley	27	1922–23	10	Smokey Harris	18	1924
					Charlie Tobin	18	1920–21

== Hall of Famers ==
Five honored members of the Hockey Hall of Fame are recognized as part of the Seattle Metropolitans.

- Frank C. Foyston
- Harry (Hap) Holmes
- Lester Patrick
- John Phillip (Jack) Walker
- Gordon (Doc) Roberts
