= 1930–31 PCHL season =

The 1930–31 PCHL season was the third season of the professional men's ice hockey Pacific Coast Hockey League, a minor professional league with teams in the western United States and western Canada. It consisted of four teams: Vancouver Lions, Seattle Eskimos, Portland Buckaroos and Tacoma Tigers.

It was the last season of the first incarnation of the PCHL. It was followed by the 1936–37 PCHL season in the second incarnation of the league.

The season did not run 36 games as the previous two seasons as Tacoma Tigers dropped out of the league after 10 games. The two best teams in the league standings met in a best-of-five playoff format series for league championship honors.

== Teams ==
1930–31 Pacific Coast Hockey League
Team	City	Arena	Capacity
Portland Buckaroos	Portland, Oregon	Portland Ice Arena	2,000
Seattle Eskimos	Seattle, Washington	Civic Ice Arena	4,000
Tacoma Tigers	Tacoma, Washington	Travelling team	N/A
Vancouver Lions	Vancouver, British Columbia	Denman Arena	10,500

=== Map of teams ===
PCHL Teams

== Final standings ==
Note: W = Wins, L = Losses, T = Ties, GF= Goals For, GA = Goals Against
Teams that qualified for the playoffs are highlighted in bold

Pacific Coast Hockey League	GP	W	L	T	GF	GA
**Seattle Eskimos**	34	16	9	9	64	51
**Vancouver Lions**	35	14	13	8	61	61
Portland Buckaroos	35	12	15	8	60	61
Tacoma Tigers	10	2	7	1	12	24

== Playoffs ==
Vancouver Lions defeated Seattle Eskimos 3 games to 0.
