= Western Hockey League (disambiguation) =

The Western Hockey League is a major junior ice hockey league based in Western Canada and the Northwestern United States.

Western Hockey League may also refer to:

- Western Canada Hockey League, active 1921–1926
- Western Canada Hockey League (1932–33)
- Western Hockey League (1952–1974)
