= Ice hockey in Seattle =

Ice hockey in the Seattle metropolitan area includes professional teams as early as 1915, such as the Seattle Metropolitans, the first United States–based team to win the Stanley Cup. The area has been represented by various teams in the iterations of the Western Hockey League (WHL) since 1944, including the major junior Seattle Thunderbirds and Everett Silvertips. Presently, Seattle has a National Hockey League (NHL) franchise, the Seattle Kraken, who began play in the 2021–22 season, and a Professional Women's Hockey League (PWHL) franchise, the Seattle Torrent, who began play in the 2025–26 season.

There is also a history of professional minor-league and junior teams in the nearby cities of the Puget Sound region, such as Everett and Tacoma.

== Seattle Metropolitans (1915–1924) ==
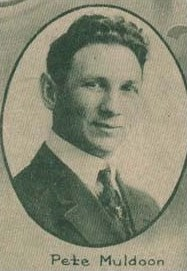
Pete Muldoon, head coach of the Seattle Metropolitans. He is honored by the Seattle Kraken as the namesake of their most valuable player trophy.

Professional ice hockey in Seattle dates back to 1915, with the formation of the Pacific Coast Hockey Association (PCHA)'s Seattle Metropolitans.

The Seattle Metropolitans were a professional ice hockey team based in Seattle, playing in the Pacific Coast Hockey Association (PCHA) from 1915 to 1924. During their nine seasons, the Metropolitans were the PCHA's most successful franchise, as they went 112–96–2 in their nine years as a franchise (outpacing the next best team in the Vancouver Millionaires, who went 109–97–2 during that same period). The Metropolitans also won the most regular season PCHA championships, winning five times (while Vancouver won four), with Seattle finishing second on three other occasions. The Metropolitans played their home games at the 2,500 seat Seattle Ice Arena located downtown at 5th and University.

The Metropolitans made seven postseason appearances in their nine seasons. The team won the Stanley Cup in 1917, tied for the Cup in 1919 and lost in five games in 1920. The story of the Metropolitans' 1917 championship, which made Seattle the first American team to win the Cup, was chronicled in the book When It Mattered Most. Seattle's Stanley Cup championship occurred 11 years before the New York Rangers became the National Hockey League's first American franchise to win the Cup in 1928.

The Metropolitans folded in 1924 when a replacement for the Seattle Ice Arena could not be found. Seattle's next team eligible to win the Stanley Cup, the NHL expansion Seattle Kraken, began play in 2021, and have honored the Metropolitans in various ways since.

=== Formation ===
The Metropolitans were formed in 1915 as an expansion team by Frank and Lester Patrick, the owners of the Pacific Coast Hockey Association. The team's name was derived from the Metropolitan Building Company, the entity that built the Seattle Ice Arena on the University of Washington's Metropolitan Tract property.

A long simmering player war between the NHA and PCHA exploded once again in 1915 when the Patricks caught the Ottawa Senators trying to poach Vancouver's best player, Cyclone Taylor. In response, the Patricks raided the Toronto Blueshirts, signing Eddie Carpenter, Frank Foyston, Hap Holmes, Jack Walker and Cully Wilson for the Metropolitans. The Blueshirts had won the Stanley Cup in 1914 and this immediately provided Seattle with a competitive squad. To complete the roster, Pete Muldoon signed forward Bobby Rowe and offered a tryout to center Bernie Morris who had both been reserves the previous season in Victoria and cut by the team that summer. Muldoon immediately moved Rowe to defense, where he thrived, and Morris quickly made the team, scoring the game-winning goal in the Metropolitans' first game and eventually becoming a 5-time PCHA All-Star. Roy Rickey was signed a few weeks into the inaugural season after he was released by Vancouver. The Metropolitans signed Jim Riley just prior to the 1916–17 season after he, too, was cut by Victoria.

In an era of one-year contracts and rampant player movement, the Metropolitans roster remained relatively stable. With a typical roster of nine skaters, the Metropolitans had seven players spend seven or more seasons in Seattle. Foyston, Walker and Rowe played all nine campaigns while Morris, Holmes and Rickey spent eight years with the Metropolitans and Jim Riley seven, missing 1918 while serving overseas in World War I.

The team's official scorer was Royal Brougham, who covered the Metropolitans, Sonics, Seahawks and Mariners during his 68-year career at the Seattle Post-Intelligencer.

== Early women's teams (1917–1921) ==
As early as January 1916, Frank Patrick and Lester Patrick talked of the formation of a women's league to complement the Pacific Coast Hockey Association. The proposal included teams from Vancouver, Victoria, Portland and Seattle. The league never formed but in January 1917, the Vancouver News-Advertiser reported that wives of the Seattle Metropolitans had assembled a team. This team, known as the Seattle Hockeyettes, participated in local tournament play.

=== Seattle Vamps (1920–1921) ===
Seattle Vamps
- City: Seattle, Washington
- League: International Ladies' Hockey League
- Operated: 1920–1921
- Home arena: Seattle Ice Arena

The Seattle Vamps, also occasionally referred to as the Seattle Sweeties, were a women's ice hockey team based in Seattle that competed in the 1921 International Ladies' Hockey League season, the world's first women's tournament of the sport to include entrants from multiple nations.

In February 1921, Frank Patrick announced a women's international championship series that would be played in conjunction with the Pacific Coast Hockey Association. The three teams that competed were the Vancouver Amazons, Victoria Kewpies, and Seattle Vamps. On February 21, 1921, the Seattle Vamps competed against the Vancouver Amazons in Vancouver, and were vanquished by a 5–0 score. Two days later, the Vamps played against a team from the University of British Columbia and won the game. Jerry Reed scored three goals (a hat trick) in the game for the Vamps. In both games, the Vancouver media referred to the Seattle team as the Seattle Sweeties. The Amazons traveled to Seattle and defeated them again. On March 2, 1921, the Vamps were defeated by the Kewpies 1–0 in Seattle. In the rematch on March 12, the Vamps travelled to Victoria. The result was a 1–1 tie, and Jerry Reed scored the goal for Seattle. The goaltender for the Vamps was Mildren Terran. After the 1921 season, the Vamps and the Kewpies ceased operations.

== Early PCHL teams (1928–1945) ==
The closure of the Seattle Ice Arena in 1924, which ended the Metropolitans' existence, necessitated the construction of a new arena. The Civic Ice Arena was completed in 1928, and with it came the return of professional hockey to Seattle after this four-year hiatus. A Seattle team entered as a founding member of each iteration of the Pacific Coast Hockey League.

=== Seattle Eskimos (1928–1931) ===
Seattle Eskimos
- City: Seattle, Washington
- League: Pacific Coast Hockey League
- Operated: 1928–1931
- Home arena: Civic Ice Arena
- Colors: Green, red, white
- Owner: Pete Muldoon

The Seattle Eskimos were a professional ice hockey team based in Seattle from 1928 to 1931. Founded by former Seattle Metropolitans manager Pete Muldoon, the team was a founding member of the first iteration of the PCHL, and played in the Civic Ice Arena.

The team wore the barberpole green, red, and white jerseys of the Metropolitans with a modified S wordmark crest.

=== Seattle Sea Hawks (1933–1941) ===
Following the demise of the first iteration of the PCHL, the Seattle Sea Hawks began as a founding member of the North West Hockey League. The team played in the NWHL during that league's three season existence The Seattle Sea Hawks (sometimes written as Seattle Seahawks) were a minor professional hockey team based in Seattle, Washington, playing at the Civic Ice Arena. The Sea Hawks began as a founding member of the North West Hockey League, playing in that league for its three-season existence from 1933 to 1936, before joining the second iteration of the Pacific Coast Hockey League until 1941. They were the NWHL champions in 1935–36. For their final season in 1940–41, the team was sold to new ownership and renamed the Seattle Olympics.

Their first coach and general manager was Frank Foyston, a former Seattle Metropolitan and a member of the Hockey Hall of Fame.

=== Seattle Stars (1944–1945) ===
Seattle Stars
- City: Seattle, Washington
- League: Pacific Coast Hockey League
- Operated: 1944–1945
- Home arena: Civic Ice Arena
- Owner: Emil Sick
- Head coach: Roger Jenkins

The Seattle Stars, also known as Sick's Stars, were a minor professional hockey team based at Seattle's Civic Ice Arena who played during the final iteration of the PCHL's inaugural 1944–45 season. The team was owned by Emil Sick, owner of Rainier Beer and the Seattle Rainiers baseball team.

In their single season, the team was coached by Roger Jenkins, who had coached the previous season for the cross-town rival Seattle Isaacson Iron Workers. The team won 12 games, lost 14, and tied 1 for a third-place finish in the PCHL's North division, before losing to the Portland Eagles in the first round of the playoffs.

== Seattle Totems (1944–1975) ==
Professional hockey returned to Seattle in the post-war era in the form of two new teams playing in the final iteration of the PCHL. One team (the Stars) folded after one season, leaving the other (the Ironmen) to survive and become the Seattle Totems. Known under several names prior to 1958, the franchise was a member of the Pacific Coast Hockey League (renamed the Western Hockey League in 1952) between 1944 and 1974. In their last season of existence, the Totems played in the Central Hockey League in the 1974–75 season. They played their home games in the Civic Ice Arena and later at the Seattle Center Coliseum.

=== Seattle Ironmen (1944–1952) ===
After World War II, the Pacific Coast Hockey League (PCHL), a major professional league on the West Coast in the 1910s and 1920s, was resurrected as a semi-professional loop. Seattle, as a notably strong hockey town and the first city outside of Canada to host a Stanley Cup champion (the 1917 Seattle Metropolitans), was granted two franchises, one of which were the Seattle Ironmen.

The club had been founded as an amateur team the previous year in the Northwest Industrial Hockey League, where they were known as the Seattle Isaacson Iron Workers. As NIHL teams were operated by war industry companies, most players for the Iron Workers additionally worked at the production lines of the U.S. Navy's Isaacson Steel plant in nearby Tukwila, Washington.

When the club entered the new PCHL in its inaugural 1944–45 season, it was renamed the Seattle Ironmen and hired Frank Dotten as its new head coach. The club had modest success, finishing in first place in the 1947–48 regular season. When the league itself became fully professional for the 1948–49 season, only four of the previous season's players remained, leaving the roster to be replaced by amateur players from Tacoma and the team to finish last in its division.

Over its existence, the Ironmen's most notable stars were Gordon Kerr, the team's leading scorer in those years with 235 points in 244 games, William Robinson, Eddie Dartnell and Joe Bell. Among other notables for the team were future NHL star goaltender Al Rollins and legendary Philadelphia Flyers coach Fred Shero.

The Ironmen served as inspiration for the 2022 Reverse Retro alternate uniform for the NHL's Seattle Kraken.

=== Seattle Bombers (1952–1954) ===
In 1952, the league changed its name to the Western Hockey League (WHL), and the Ironmen themselves changed their name to the Seattle Bombers the following season. The team continued to play poorly for two seasons, and the only bright spot was the debut for Seattle of the greatest minor league scorer of all time, Guyle Fielder. After two seasons of increasing travel costs—for which the Bombers received aid from the league—Seattle suspended operations for the 1955 season.

=== Seattle Americans (1955–1958) ===
The team rejoined the WHL as the Seattle Americans the following season, finishing in first place in 1957 led by a tremendous season by Fielder, who broke the professional single season scoring record with 122 points en route to Most Valuable Player honors and the first of four straight scoring championships for Seattle. Among other notables for the Americans were Val Fonteyne, notable as the least penalized player of all time, future Vezina winner Charlie Hodge, and future National Hockey League general managers Emile Francis and Keith Allen. The team's final season as the Americans, in 1958, saw the first time the franchise would win a playoff series.

=== Seattle Totems (1958–1975) ===
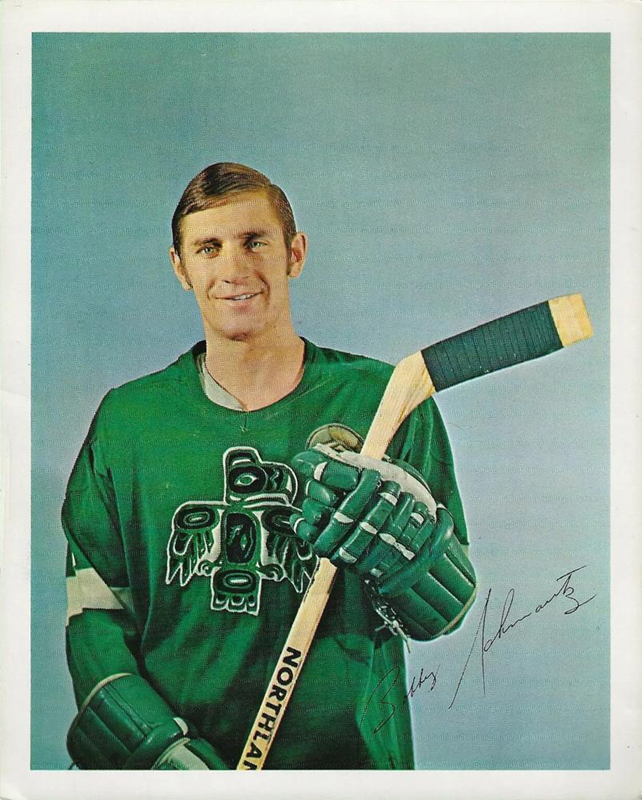
1969-70 photo of Bobby Schmautz for the Totems

The Americans were renamed the Seattle Totems for the 1958–59 season, the name by which it would go for the rest of its existence. Fielder and Filion remained the team's great stars, but like many other WHL teams the Totems had very stable rosters, and players such as Marc Boileau, Gerry Leonard, Bill MacFarland, Jim Powers, Gordie Sinclair and future NHL coach and general manager Tom McVie spent many seasons each in Seattle colors. Allen was the team's coach its first seven seasons as the Totems, guiding the team to a first-place finish in 1959 and to the playoffs six out of the seven years of his tenure. The Totems played the 1974–75 season in the Central Hockey League after the WHL folded.

== Failed attempts to acquire an NHL team (1974–2017) ==
On June 12, 1974, the NHL announced new expansion teams in Denver and Seattle that would start play in the 1976–77 season. Vince Abbey led the Seattle group. The Seattle team, which according to season ticket promotions would have kept the WHL name of Totems, never played a game. The NHL rescinded the expansion offer later in 1974 after Abbey missed deadlines to pay a deposit and a franchise fee. Abbey and Eldred Barnes filed an antitrust lawsuit against the NHL, seeking $30 million in damages. In December 1983, a judge dismissed the suit while the trial was in progress and ordered the plaintiffs to pay the Vancouver Canucks US$600,000 in damages on a counterclaim.

On June 29, 1975, Abbey tried to purchase the Pittsburgh Penguins with the intention to move the team to Seattle when they were sold in a bankruptcy auction for US$4.4 million.

Another local group attempted to bring an NHL expansion team to Seattle in 1990, but the deal failed due to the financial terms that the NHL demanded. Then-Seattle SuperSonics owner Barry Ackerley committed to submitting an expansion application to the NHL by a September 15, 1990, deadline as part of a proposed new arena deal, provided that a group could be found willing to meet the NHL's asking price of $50 million. His son Bill, president of the Ackerley Group, worked with Bill Lear of the First National Bank of Chicago, in order to find an ownership group for the prospective franchise. The only group to step forward was led by Microsoft executive Chris Larson and former Seattle Totems player and coach Bill MacFarland. Ackerley and the Larson–MacFarland group met multiple times, but the Larson–MacFarland group determined that the expansion franchise was worth $15 million less than what the NHL was asking for.

Ackerley rescinded Seattle's bid without Larson's or MacFarland's knowledge. Larson and MacFarland told the Seattle media that the Ackerley Group cost Seattle a chance at an NHL team. Ackerley responded that Seattle lost its chance because Larson and MacFarland were unwilling to accept the NHL's expansion terms. Among the unfavorable terms were very high season ticket requirements; a 20-year arena lease with a "substantial" share of arena revenues from concessions, parking, and ad signage; priority status for postseason arena dates; and a secured US$5 million line of credit in case the league had to take over ownership of the team. The NHL, unable to come to an agreement with any owners in Seattle, instead sold two new franchises to groups in Ottawa and Tampa Bay.

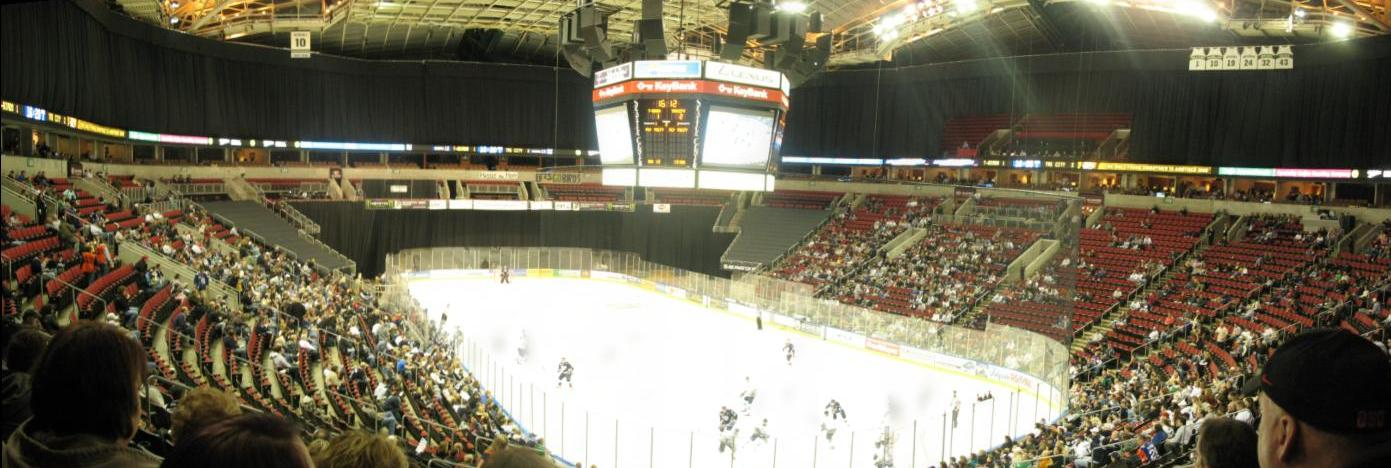
KeyArena post-1995 hockey configuration

Later talks about an NHL team for Seattle were derailed due to renovations to KeyArena. Prior to renovations in 1994 and 1995, the arena had an ice hockey configuration that had been used by the WHL Totems. After the renovations, which optimized the arena for the Seattle SuperSonics, the arena's scoreboard and seats were not positioned well for hockey games. This was a major factor in the major junior Seattle Thunderbirds leaving for the ShoWare Center in Kent in 2009. In 2012, League deputy commissioner Bill Daly stated that KeyArena would be "a difficult arena for hockey" due to the large number of obstructed-view seats. All NHL exhibition games held in Seattle after the renovation were instead hosted at the Tacoma Dome, 30 miles (48 km) south of Seattle.

Expansion and relocation proposals often came with a new arena proposal, especially after the SuperSonics relocated to Oklahoma City in 2008. Several investors considered Seattle as a locale for expansion or relocation on condition that a suitable arena could be built. In 2011, Don Levin, owner of the Chicago Wolves, had expressed interest in building a new arena in nearby Bellevue that could host an NHL team. On February 16, 2012, a plan was announced to build a new arena in Seattle's SoDo district, just south of Safeco Field. An investment group led by hedge fund manager Chris Hansen proposed the arena, seeking to host a returned SuperSonics franchise and possibly an NHL team as well.

When Greg Jamison was unable to meet a deadline to purchase the Phoenix Coyotes on January 31, 2013, speculation began that the team would be relocated to Seattle. On June 16, 2013, it was confirmed that the Phoenix Coyotes would be moving to Seattle if an arena deal between the team and the City of Glendale was not reached. Ray Bartozek and Anthony Lanza intended to purchase the franchise for US$220 million and would have begun operations in Seattle for the following season. The relocation plan ended after July 3, 2013, when the Glendale City Council voted 4–3 to keep the Phoenix Coyotes in Glendale.

A 2013 study by Nate Silver concluded that Seattle had the largest number of avid ice hockey fans of any U.S. media market that did not have an NHL team.

== Seattle Kraken (2018–present) ==
=== Successful expansion bid (2017–2021) ===
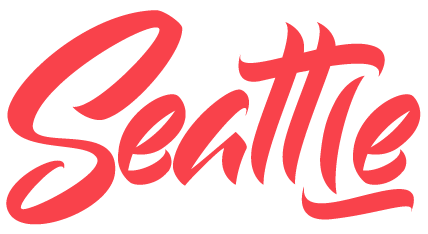
Seattle's initial wordmark used prior to the name and logo unveiling

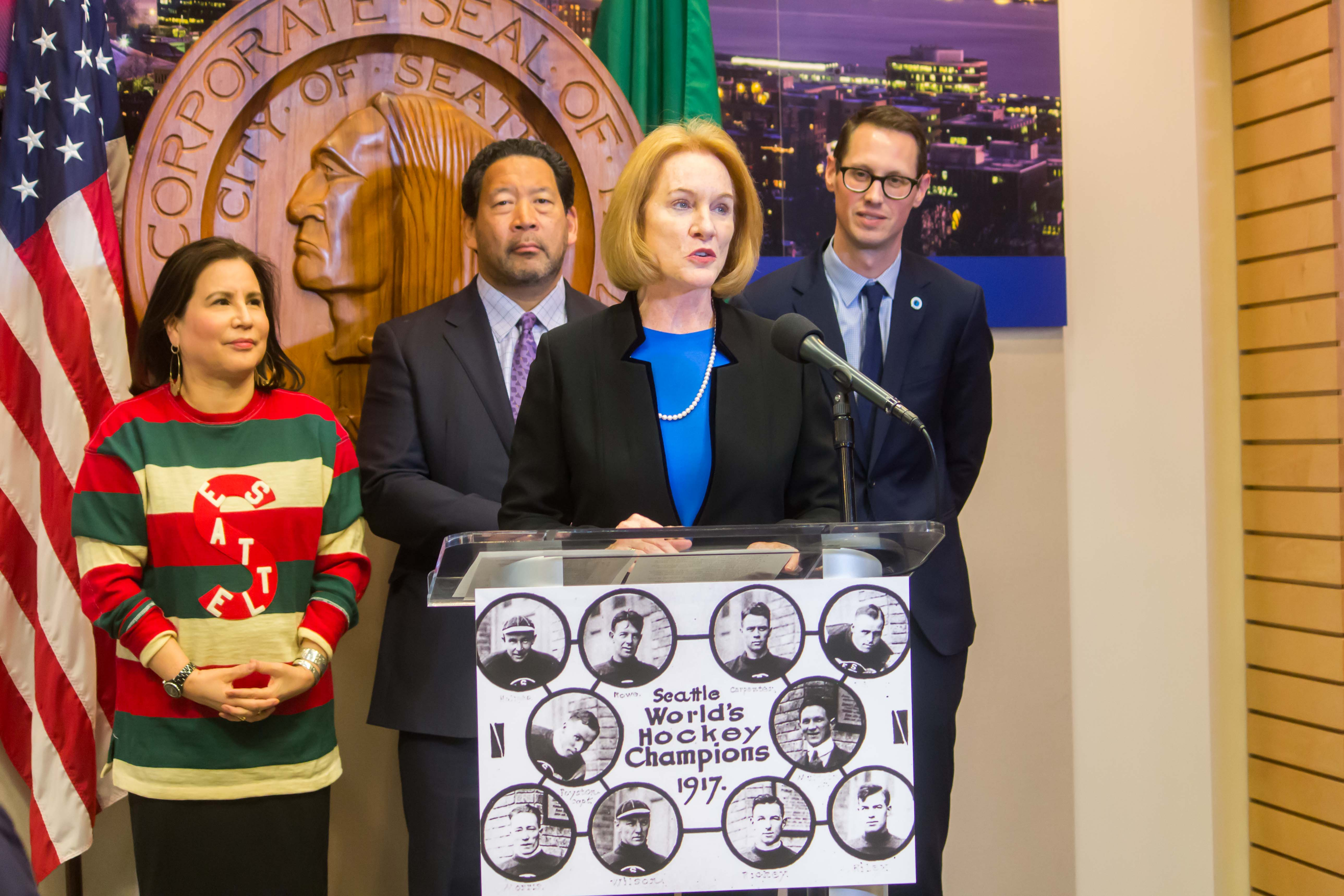
Seattle mayor Jenny Durkan and other municipal government officials speak on December 7, 2017, after the NHL's board of governors agreed to consider an expansion application from Seattle

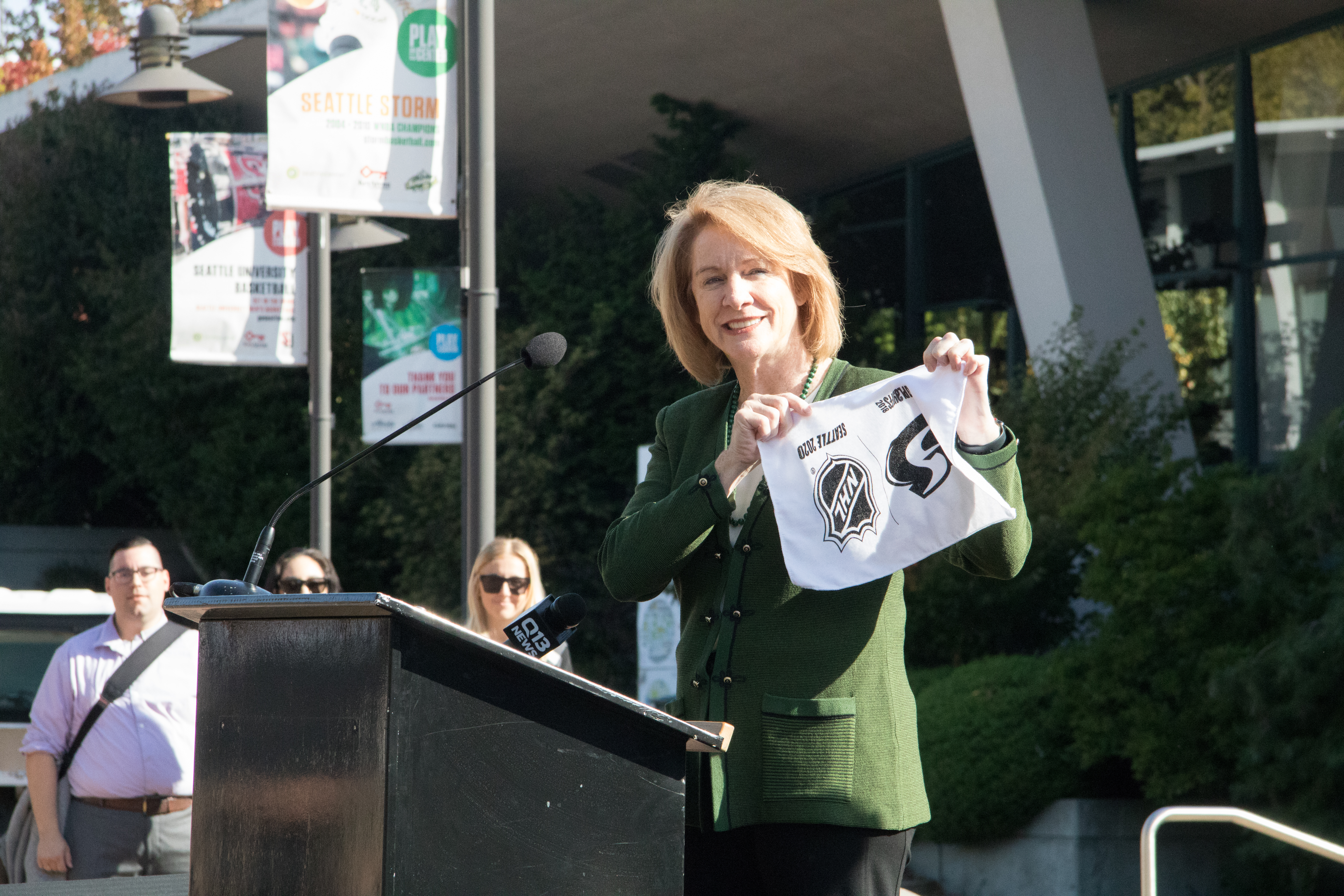
Seattle mayor Jenny Durkan celebrating the city's expansion team in September 2018

On December 4, 2017, the Seattle City Council voted 7–1 to approve a memorandum of understanding between the city of Seattle and the Los Angeles–based Oak View Group, co-founded by Tim Leiweke, for renovations of KeyArena. Renovations for the arena began in 2018 and were completed in 2021. The arena was renamed Climate Pledge Arena after a new naming rights deal was signed with Amazon.com. The original roof remains in place, as it is considered a landmark. The rest of the building saw a complete renovation with land being dug down and out. While the renovations were intended for acquiring an NHL franchise, acquiring a new SuperSonics basketball team was also within the design of the approval. On December 7, the NHL's board of governors agreed to consider an expansion application from Seattle, with an expansion fee set at US$650 million. The Seattle ownership group was represented by David Bonderman and Jerry Bruckheimer, who conducted a preliminary season ticket drive to gauge interest in Seattle.

On February 13, 2018, the Oak View Group filed an application with the NHL for an expansion team and paid a US$10 million application fee. At the time, the earliest a Seattle NHL expansion team could have begun playing was the 2020–21 season pending the completion of arena renovations.

On March 1, 2018, a ticket drive began to gauge interests in season ticket deposits. Oak View reported that their initial goal of 10,000 deposits was surpassed in 12 minutes, and that they received 25,000 deposits in 75 minutes. On April 11, 2018, Tod Leiweke was named CEO of Seattle's NHL expansion team. On June 18, 2018, Dave Tippett was named as a senior advisor. Another step towards an expansion team was taken on October 2, 2018, when the NHL Executive Committee unanimously agreed to recommend the expansion bid to a vote of the Board of Governors in December.

The NHL Board of Governors voted unanimously to approve Seattle's expansion team on December 4, 2018. The Seattle Kraken played their first season in 2021–22 as a member of the Pacific Division in the Western Conference, consequently shifting the Arizona Coyotes from the Pacific Division to the Central Division to balance out the four divisions at eight teams each. In May 2019, the team launched an interactive "fan portal" where fans could propose a name and uniform colors for the team, answer poll questions, get information about ticket pricing and seating, and view a timeline of past and future key events involving the club.

On July 23, 2020, the franchise announced their team name, the Seattle Kraken, as well as their team colors, branding, and home jersey. The event was held under the banner of "Release the Kraken", a phrase popularized by the 1981 film Clash of the Titans and the 2010 remake. "Kraken" was a name that was already popular with fans prior to its official adoption. The franchise's promotional materials state that it was adopted to honor the maritime culture of Seattle, as well as in reference to the giant Pacific octopus, the largest species of octopus in the world, which can be found in the waters of the Pacific Northwest.

On April 30, 2021, the franchise paid the final installment of the $650 million expansion fee, officially making the Seattle Kraken the 32nd team of the NHL.

=== First seasons (2021–present) ===
The Kraken made their first signing, Luke Henman, on May 12, 2021. On June 24, the organization hired Dave Hakstol as their inaugural head coach. On June 28, the Kraken announced the Charlotte Checkers as their inaugural American Hockey League (AHL) affiliate team, sharing them with the Florida Panthers.

An expansion draft was held on July 21, in a similar manner to a previous expansion draft held in 2017 for the Vegas Golden Knights, who were themselves exempt from the 2021 expansion draft. Notable selections included Jordan Eberle from the New York Islanders and Mark Giordano from the Calgary Flames. The Kraken selected their first draft pick, Matty Beniers, as the second overall selection at the 2021 NHL entry draft. The Kraken also signed many other players. Notable signings included goaltender Philipp Grubauer and forwards Jaden Schwartz and Alexander Wennberg. On October 11, the Kraken named Mark Giordano as the team's inaugural captain.

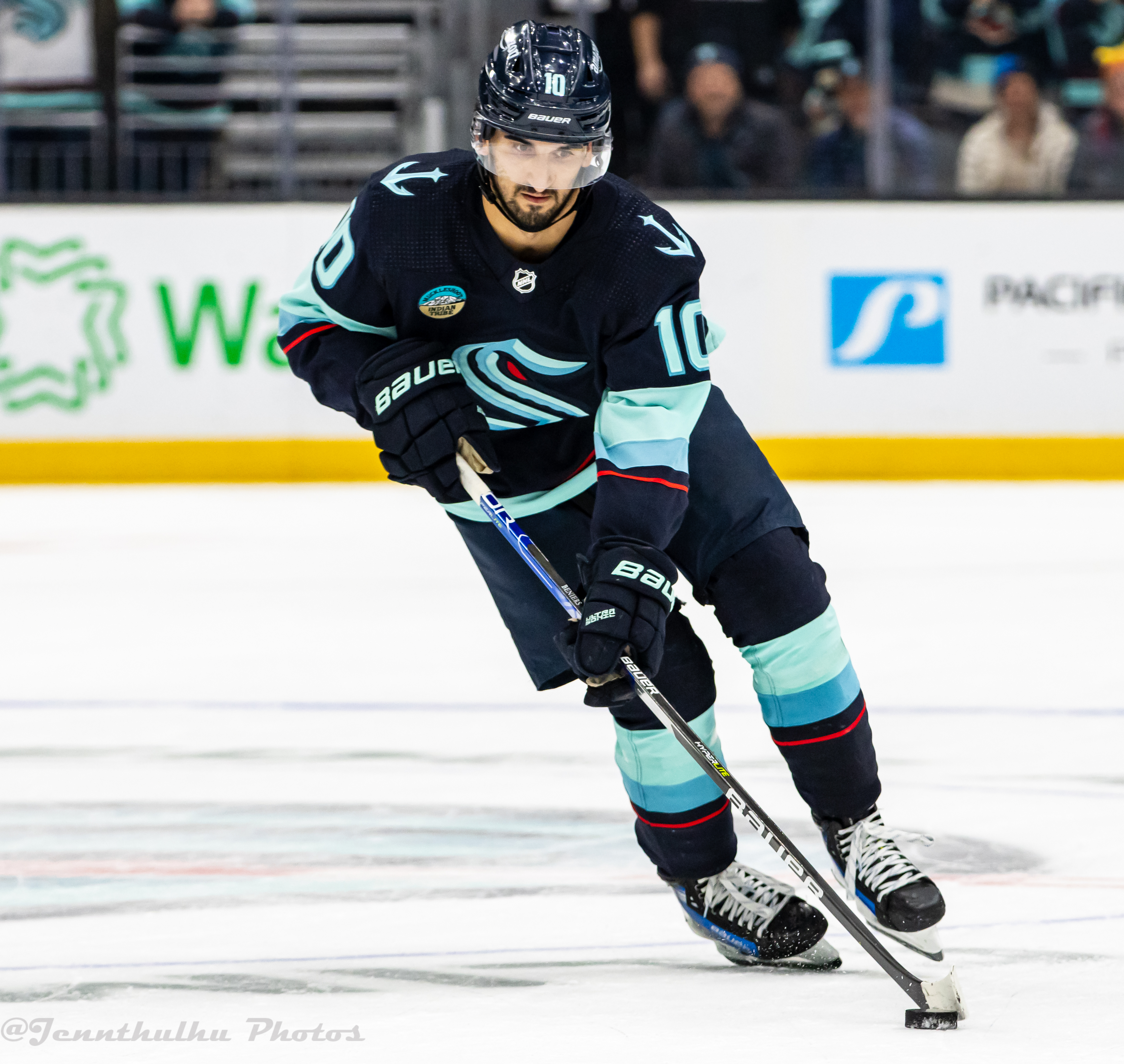
Matty Beniers was the first-ever Kraken draft pick, selected at the 2021 NHL entry draft.

The Kraken played their first regular season game on October 12, a 4–3 loss to the Vegas Golden Knights, where Ryan Donato scored the team's first goal. The Kraken's first win came in their second game on October 14, when they defeated the Nashville Predators 4–3. Following a 6–1 loss to the Philadelphia Flyers, goaltender Joey Daccord was named the starter instead of Grubauer in a 4–2 loss to the New Jersey Devils. The Kraken played their first home game at Climate Pledge Arena on October 23, a 4–2 loss to the Vancouver Canucks. Prior to the game, the Kraken retired jersey number 32, in recognition of the franchise being the 32nd to join the NHL and in honor of the 32,000 fans who placed deposits for tickets on the first possible day. The Kraken picked up their first home win on October 26, against the Montreal Canadiens. Goaltender Chris Driedger made his first start with the Kraken on November 9, in a 4–2 loss to the Golden Knights. The Kraken had several losing streaks in their season. However, Philipp Grubauer recorded the franchise's first shutout, making 19 saves in an 3–0 victory against the New York Islanders. On March 20, 2022, the Kraken's captaincy became vacant after Giordano was traded to the Toronto Maple Leafs. The Kraken were eliminated from playoff contention on March 30 following a 3–0 loss to the Golden Knights. The Kraken finished their inaugural season in last place of the Pacific Division with a 27–49–6 record and 60 points.

The Kraken's second season was far better in terms of winning. On July 13, 2022, the Kraken signed Martin Jones to a one-year contract. He made his debut with the Kraken on October 13, notching a 4–1 victory. In early January, Jones led the Kraken through an 8-game win streak. In doing, so the Kraken became the first team to win all seven games of a road trip. On April 6, the Kraken clinched their first playoff berth, qualifying for the 2023 Stanley Cup playoffs as the first wild card from the Western Conference with a record of 46–28–8 and 100 points. On April 13, it was announced that forward Andre Burakovsky would miss the first round of the playoffs after missing the last 33 games of the season, due to an unspecified lower body injury. On April 30, they defeated the Colorado Avalanche in the opening round, becoming the first expansion team in NHL history to win their first playoff series against the defending Stanley Cup champions. The Kraken lost to the Dallas Stars in the second round in seven games. Both series lasted the full seven games. On June 26, Matty Beniers was named the winner of the Calder Memorial Trophy for being the NHL rookie of the year.

The Kraken struggled offensively in their third season, only producing 217 goals. Prior to the season, the Kraken re-signed goaltender Joey Daccord. In December and January, following an eight-game skid, Daccord started in eight out of nine games of a franchise record nine-game win streak, part of a 13-game point streak. In the midst of the streak, Daccord played in the 2024 NHL Winter Classic, where he achieved the first shutout in Winter Classic history with a 3–0 victory over the Vegas Golden Knights. Two days before the NHL's Trade Deadline, the Kraken traded Wennberg to the New York Rangers in exchange for second and fourth round picks. The Kraken were eliminated from playoff contention on April 3, following a 5–2 loss to the Los Angeles Kings. The Kraken finished their season with a 34–35–13 record and 81 points. On April 29, following the season, head coach Dave Hakstol was fired, being replaced by Coachella Valley Firebirds head coach Dan Bylsma on May 28.

== Seattle Torrent (2025–present) ==
=== Background and expansion ===
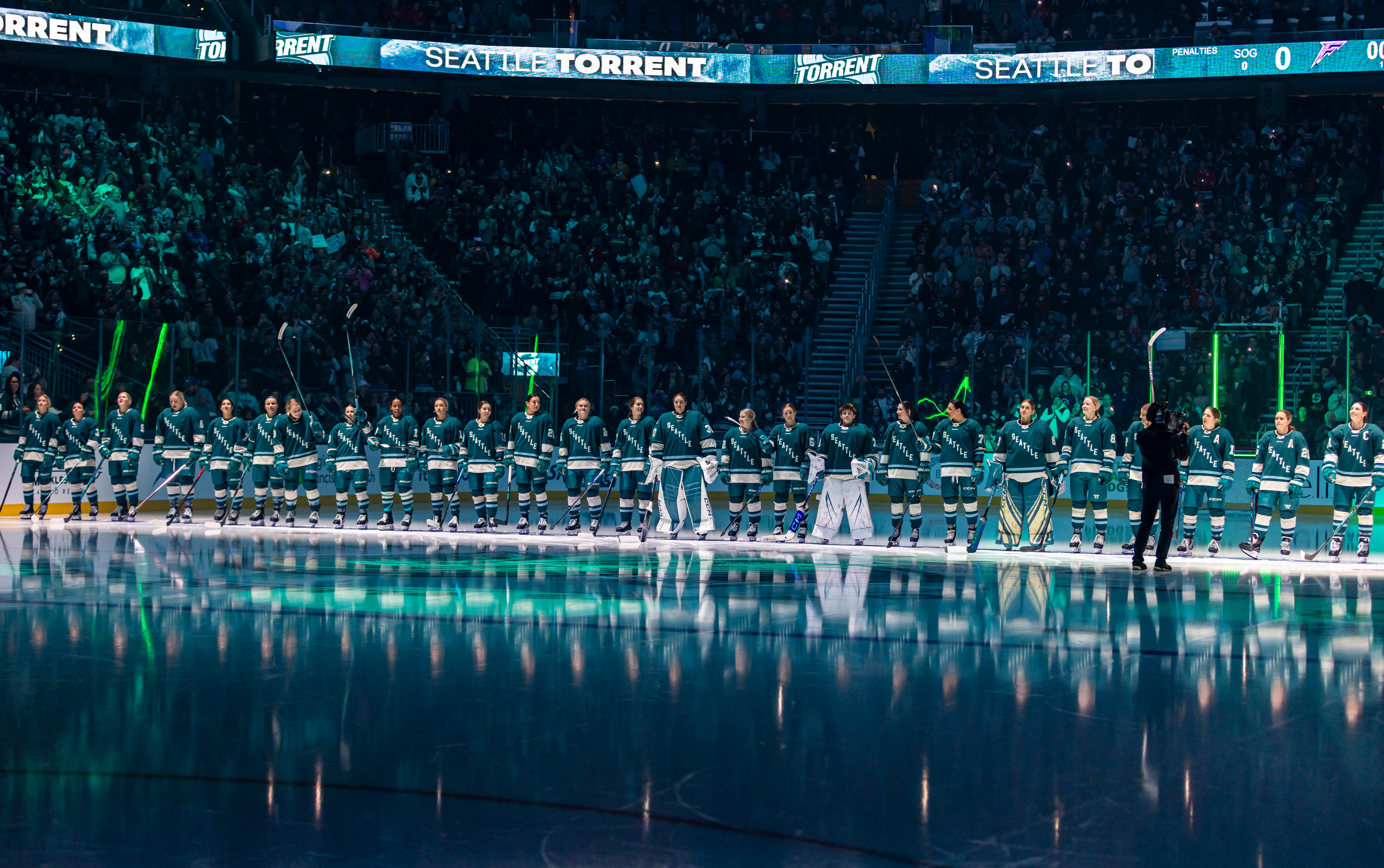
Torrent players line up ahead of their inaugural home game at Climate Pledge, November 2025

Seattle had long been considered a strong candidate for Professional Women's Hockey League (PWHL) expansion, having previously demonstrated substantial support for women's hockey. In 2022, the city hosted a Rivalry Series game between the United States and Canada women's national teams at Climate Pledge Arena, drawing 14,551 fans—the highest attendance for a Rivalry Series game in history and a then-record for a non-college women's hockey game in the United States.

On January 5, 2025, Seattle hosted its first PWHL game as part of the league's Takeover Tour, a series of neutral-site regular-season games designed to showcase the league in potential expansion markets. The Boston Fleet defeated the Montreal Victoire 3–2 in a shootout in front of a season-high crowd of 12,608 at Climate Pledge Arena. The event featured Seattle Kraken assistant coach Jessica Campbell—the first female full-time assistant coach in NHL history—performing the ceremonial puck drop, while Seattle sports icons Sue Bird and Megan Rapinoe were in attendance. The strong turnout and enthusiastic reception helped solidify Seattle's case for expansion.

On April 30, 2025, the PWHL officially announced Seattle as one of its first two expansion franchises, alongside Vancouver. The team initially operated as PWHL Seattle during the 2025 offseason before its official identity was revealed. Steve O'Rourke, former head coach of the Oshawa Generals, was named the team's inaugural head coach on June 20, 2025.

=== Team identity and branding ===
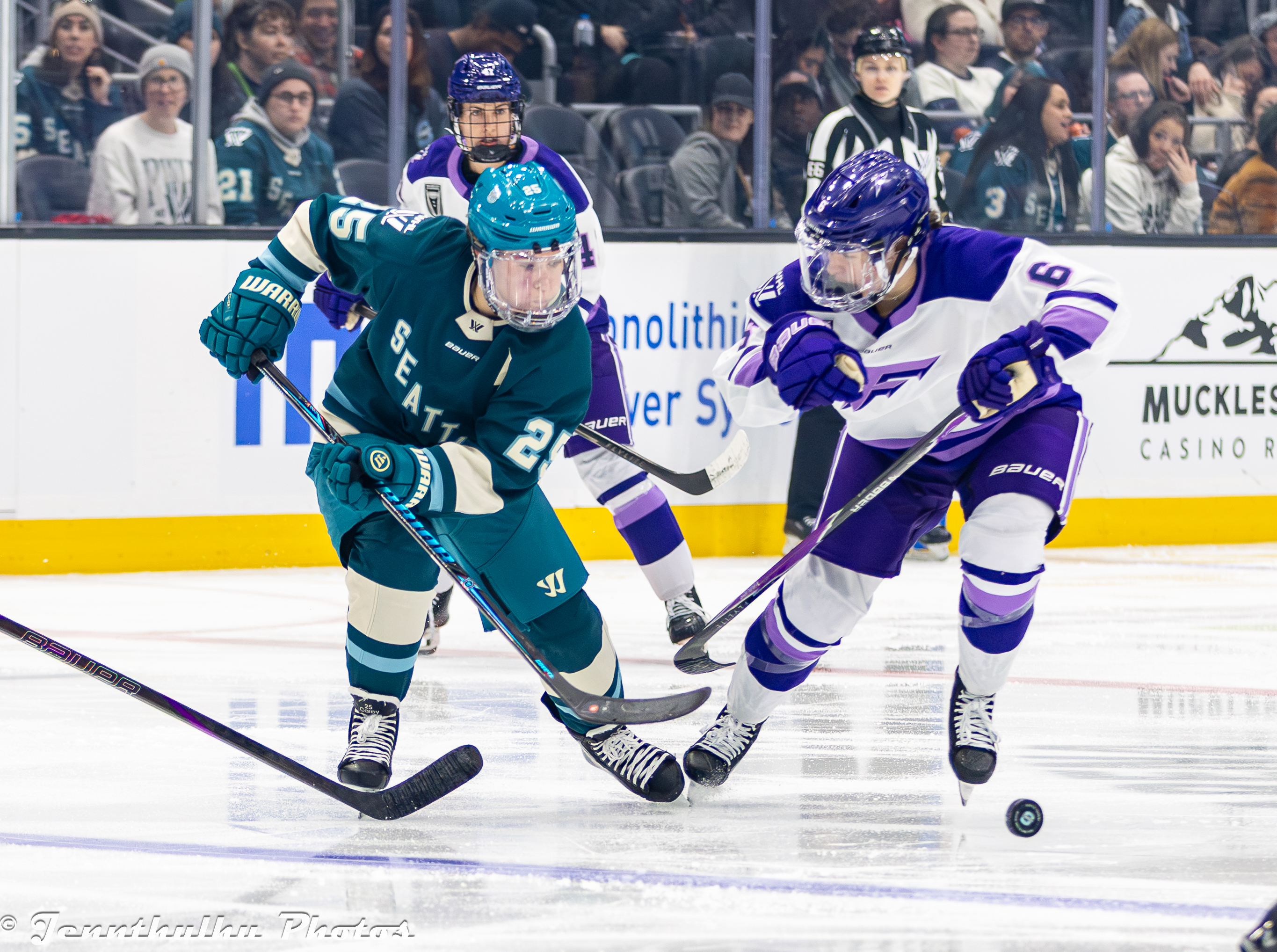
Alex Carpenter on the ice for the Torrent against the Minnesota Frost, November 2025

The Seattle Torrent identity was officially unveiled on November 6, 2025, at Seattle's Museum of Pop Culture (MoPOP) in front of media members, city leaders, and season ticket holders. The name "Torrent" draws inspiration from the powerful waterways that shape Washington's landscape, symbolizing the team's determination. The logo features an "S" that serves as both a letterform for Seattle and a rush of water, with flowing curves mirroring river channels. The primary color palette consists of Slate Green and Blue (both Shadow and Glacier Blue), reflecting Seattle's distinctive waterways and paying tribute to the city's sports community.

The reveal was narrated by team forward Hilary Knight and introduced the team's tagline: "Forged by nature, unstoppable by will." Goaltender Corinne Schroeder said of the name, "It's fitting, but it's also fitting in a sense, that's what we want to be. We want to be relentless, we want to be unpredictable, we want to really be a powerhouse." On November 14, 2025, Knight was named the team's inaugural captain.

=== Inaugural season ===
Like the Kraken, the Torrent play their home games at Climate Pledge Arena and practice at Kraken Community Iceplex. The team began play in the 2025–26 PWHL season, facing fellow expansion team Vancouver Goldeneyes in their inaugural game on November 21, 2025, at Pacific Coliseum in Vancouver. The sold-out crowd of 14,958 set a new PWHL attendance record for a team's home arena. The first two goals in franchise history were scored by Julia Gosling, but Vancouver rallied to win 4–3 in overtime.

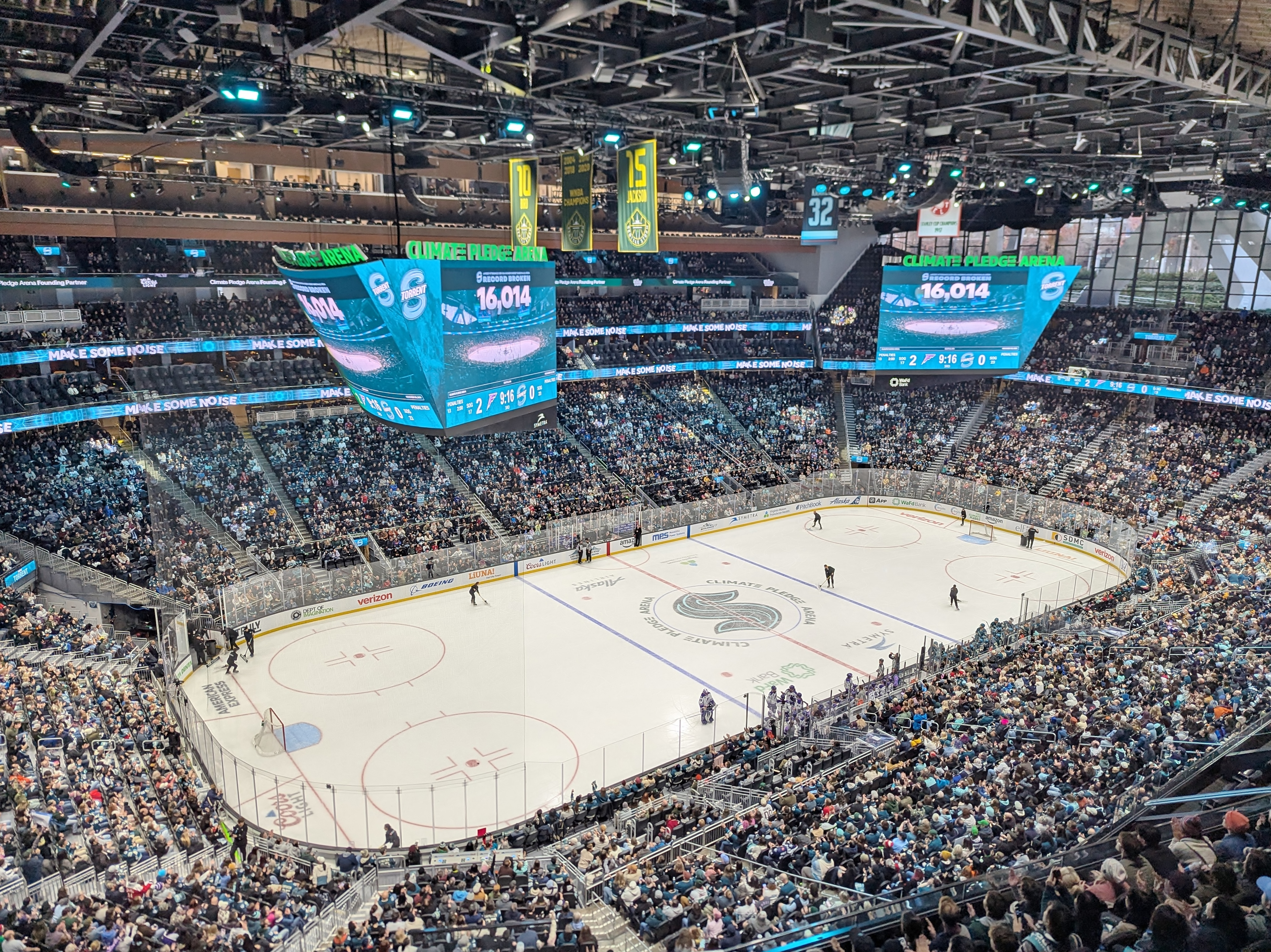
Multiple record-breaking crowd at the inaugural home game for the Seattle Torrent, November 2025

The Torrent's inaugural home game took place on November 28, 2025, against the two-time defending Walter Cup champion Minnesota Frost. The game drew 16,014 fans, setting multiple attendance records. The attendance of 16,014 broke several U.S. women's hockey records:

- Largest crowd for a women's hockey game in a U.S. arena, surpassing the previous record of 15,359 set at the Kohl Center when Wisconsin played St. Cloud State on January 14, 2017
- U.S. professional women's hockey attendance record, surpassing the previous mark of 14,288 set at Detroit's Little Caesars Arena during a PWHL Takeover Tour game on March 16, 2025
- Climate Pledge Arena attendance record for a women's hockey game, breaking the previous mark of 14,551 from the 2022 Rivalry Series
- Highest-attended primary home venue game in PWHL history

Notable attendees included U.S. Senator Patty Murray, singer-songwriter Brandi Carlile, and several Seattle Kraken players and coaches. Captain Hilary Knight described the atmosphere: "It's a dream come true to represent the city of Seattle and what they stand for in terms of supporting their teams. This is a pinch-me moment." Despite the historic turnout, Seattle lost the game 3–0 to Minnesota.

The Torrent earned their first franchise victory on December 3, 2025, defeating the New York Sirens 2–1 at Climate Pledge Arena in their third game. Alex Carpenter and Knight scored power play goals 22 seconds apart late in the third period to secure the comeback victory.

== Junior hockey (1977–present) ==
In the Puget Sound region, two teams participate in the Canadian major junior leagues: the Seattle Thunderbirds, based 20 miles (32 km) south of Seattle in Kent, and Everett Silvertips, 25 miles (40 km) north of Seattle in Everett. Both play in the U.S. Division of the Western Conference of the Western Hockey League (WHL). From 1991 to 1995, the WHL also included a team from Tacoma, the Tacoma Rockets.

The Seattle Jr. Totems compete in the United States Premier Hockey League and play their home games at Olympic View Arena in Mountlake Terrace, Washington, 13 miles (21 km) north of Seattle.

=== Seattle Thunderbirds (1977–present) ===
The team was founded in 1971 as the Vancouver Nats of the Western Canada Hockey League, but moved to Kamloops, British Columbia, after just two seasons to become the Kamloops Chiefs in 1973. In 1977, the team moved again, this time to Seattle, and was renamed the Seattle Breakers. The move came just years after the city narrowly missed out on securing a National Hockey League franchise. The Breakers began play in 1977–78, and played out of the Seattle Center Arena. Through eight seasons, the Breakers finished with a regular season record of 225 wins, 319 losses, and 32 ties; and playoff record of 11 wins and 21 losses, twice advancing as far as the West Division finals. The team nearly folded in 1982 when, under owner John Hamilton, it filed for Chapter 11 bankruptcy. This reality, combined with novel promotions like honoring unused Seattle Seahawks tickets at the gate, boosted attendance at Breakers games. This was also helped by on-ice success. Despite the off-ice challenges, the team, under coach Jack Sangster, swept the Victoria Cougars in the playoffs to advance to the Division finals. There, they faced the rival Portland Winter Hawks, dropping the series to the eventual champions 4 games to 2.

After the 1984–85 season, the Breakers were sold to new owners and renamed the Seattle Thunderbirds as part of an extensive re-branding. Along with the new name, the team changed its color-scheme from orange, blue, and white, to green, blue, and white, announced a renovation plan for its home arena, and by 1990 began playing some of its games at the larger Seattle Center Coliseum. New management promised to spare no expense and to turn the team into a contender. This included hiring Russ Farwell as manager and Barry Melrose as coach—the two had been instrumental in the Medicine Hat Tigers' 1988 Memorial Cup championship. However, despite the scoring exploits of Glen Goodall—Goodall set new league records for goals (262) and points (573) and had his number 10 jersey retired when he turned professional in 1990—it would be twelve years before the Thunderbirds broke through to their first league final. Led by star forward Patrick Marleau, the Thunderbirds faced the Lethbridge Hurricanes in the 1997 championship series, which they lost in a sweep. Although the Thunderbirds would win their first and second regular season Division titles in 2002–03 and 2004–05, the eighteen seasons after their first finals appearance would see the team advance past the second round of the playoffs just once.

In 2006, the Thunderbirds announced their intention to move to a brand new arena being constructed in Kent, south of Seattle. The purpose-built arena was a major attraction for the team.

2015 marked the beginning of the most successful period in team history, as the Thunderbirds advanced to the finals four times in eight seasons, twice capturing the Ed Chynoweth Cup as league champions. Led by the likes of Matthew Barzal, Ethan Bear, and Keegan Kolesar, the 2015–16 season saw the Thunderbirds capture their first Division title since 2005 and make their deepest playoff run since 1997 when Matthew Wedman's game four overtime goal sent the Thunderbirds past the Kelowna Rockets and into the championship final. They lost the final in five games to the Brandon Wheat Kings. The following season, the Thunderbirds returned to the final, where they faced the Regina Pats. They defeated the Pats in six games, with Alexander True scoring the title-winning goal in overtime of game six to secure Seattle's first championship. With the win, Seattle advanced to the 2017 Memorial Cup tournament, where they were eliminated after three straight losses in the preliminary round.

After two straight first-round exits and two years without playoffs due to the COVID-19 pandemic, the Thunderbirds again emerged as a contender in the 2021–22 season. That season, the team returned to the finals and faced the Edmonton Oil Kings to contest the first league playoff title since 2019. Seattle lost the final in six games. The following season was the best in Thunderbirds' history with the team posting 54 wins and 111 points. In the playoffs, they eliminated the Memorial Cup-host Kamloops Blazers in the Western Conference championship, moving on to face the Winnipeg Ice in the title series. They defeated the Ice in five games to earn a berth in the 2023 Memorial Cup tournament. There, led by Dylan Guenther and goaltender Thomas Milic, the Thunderbirds advanced to the tournament final, which they lost to the Quebec Remparts.

The Thunderbirds are one of five WHL teams based in Washington, along with the Tri-City Americans, Spokane Chiefs, Wenatchee Wild, and Everett Silvertips. The Thunderbirds have built an enduring rivalry with the Portland Winterhawks, dating back to the 1980s. Everett is the closest team to Seattle and a natural rival; and the two teams have met regularly in the playoffs, including a three-year stretch between 2016 and 2018 where the winner of the series between the two made it all the way to the championship series.

=== Tacoma Rockets (1991–1995) ===
Marcel Comeau was hired to be the first coach of the Rockets, and stayed with the team all four seasons. The 1991–92 season marks the first season of the expansion side Rockets, who began play in the Tacoma Dome, one of North America's largest hockey arenas. The inaugural Rockets blasted their way to one of the most memorable inaugural seasons in the 25-year history of the Western Hockey League. Attendance of 14,975 and 15,240 at two heated contests against their then arch rival, the Seattle Thunderbirds. This assisted the Rockets in chalking up the highest per game average for a first year expansion team under the Canadian Hockey League umbrella.

In 1992–93, the Rockets startled everyone in the league by winning 24 straight home games for an all-time Western Hockey League record. Tacoma held first place in the West Division for three months and finished with a promising 45–27–0 season. Head coach Marcel Comeau won the Dunc McCallum Memorial Trophy as the WHL coach of the year, and the CHL Coach of the Year Award as well. In addition to their winning streak, the Rockets home record of 36–6–0 and collecting 37 more points than the previous year, proved them serious contenders in the WHL. Once again the Rockets attendance of 13,769 saw them defeat the Seattle Thunderbirds 4-2 in win number 24, marking the third largest crowd in the history of the WHL. Three Rockets won best in the WHL West. Goaltender, Jeff Calvert – Most Valuable Player; Michal Sýkora – Most Valuable Player; and James Black selected as Most Sportsmanlike Player.

The 1993–94 season marked the year of transition for the Rockets, with the graduation of high scoring veteran Allan Egeland, a solid forward, Trever Fraser, and netminder, Jeff Calvert. The Rockets' third season also brought forward some of the league's best rookies and a phenomenal base of nine NHL drafted players. Six alone were selected in 1994, bringing the total to thirteen Rockets drafted in three seasons. Rockets finished third in the Western Hockey League with a 33–34–5 record.

Concluding the 1993–94 season with improved results, the Rockets entered their third campaign with a roster characterized by increased defensive size and the presence of nine players selected in the NHL Entry Draft. The team added Czech forward Václav Varaďa, who recorded 50 points and equalled the franchise’s rookie scoring record. Todd MacDonald, a 1993 draft selection by the Florida Panthers, assumed the role of starting goaltender and received a nomination for the Best in the West award. Veteran Dallas Thompson was appointed team captain. The Rockets finished the season in second place in the Western Conference.

After the 1994–95 season, low attendance forced the team to move to Kelowna, British Columbia after only four seasons, where they became the Kelowna Rockets. While the Rockets drew high attendance numbers when they played the Seattle Thunderbirds, they did not draw as well with other teams. The Tacoma Dome was not well-suited for hockey as the risers for the seats were too shallow, making the sightlines bad for hockey.

=== Everett Silvertips (since 2003) ===
The city of Everett, with plans to build a new downtown arena complex, applied for a WHL franchise and was awarded conditional approval for an expansion franchise from the league in 2001. With the new team falling within the territorial rights of the Seattle Thunderbirds, Seattle ownership was given right of first refusal to purchase the new team; Bill Yuill decided to sell the Thunderbirds in order to take over the new expansion club. The new multi-million dollar complex, the Everett Events Centre, was completed ahead of the team's inaugural season, offering a seating capacity of 8,200. In 2003, the team hired former National Hockey League coach Kevin Constantine to be its first head coach.

Beginning play in the 2003–04 season with a roster built through an expansion draft, the Silvertips rapidly established themselves as the best expansion team in league history. By January, Everett posted its 19th win of the season, breaking the previous expansion record of 18 wins posted by the 1995–96 Calgary Hitmen. The team would go on to win 35 games and finish atop the U.S. Division standings. In the playoffs, the Silvertips advanced all the way to the league final, upsetting the defending champion and heavily-favored Kelowna Rockets in the Western Conference final, with defender Mitch Love opening the series with an overtime goal. The team faced the Medicine Hat Tigers in the championship series, losing four straight games to fall short of the title. By the end of the year, the Silvertips, who earned a reputation as a disciplined defensive team, had set new records for an expansion team in every category. Constantine was named the league's coach-of-the-year.

Three seasons later, the Silvertips won the Scotty Munro Memorial Trophy for the best regular season record after its 54-win, 111-point season, before losing in the second round of the playoffs. That season, the team's first ever bantam draft selection, Zach Hamill, became the first Silvertip to lead the WHL in scoring.

The team's success on the ice translated into fan support, and the Silvertips earned a reputation for drawing strong crowds—more than a decade into the team's history, the Silvertips were in the top half of the league in attendance.

Everett established itself as a perennial playoff team, and in 2017–18, led by goaltender Carter Hart and coach Dennis Williams, the Silvertips made a second run to the league championship series. After a 47-win season, the team's best since 2007, Everett faced the Swift Current Broncos in the playoff finals, ultimately losing the series in six games. Hart's dominant season—he was named the league's best player, on top of being named its best goaltender for a third straight season—added to the team's historic reputation for exceptional goaltending. After Hart turned professional, Dustin Wolf was named top goaltender two years in a row.

Ahead of the 2024 playoffs, it was announced that long-time coach and manager Williams would be leaving the Silvertips after the season.

Led by defenceman Landon DuPont, only the second WHL player awarded exceptional player status, the Silvertips won back-to-back regular season titles in 2024–25 and 2025–26. In 2026, the Silvertips won their first Ed Chynoweth Cup as WHL champions, defeating Prince Albert Raiders in the playoff finals. This earned Everett its first trip to the Memorial Cup tournament, which in 2026 was hosted by the Kelowna Rockets. The Silvertips advanced to the tournament final, but were defeated by the Kitchener Rangers.

== Professional minor-league teams in Tacoma (1930–2002) ==
The city of Tacoma has hosted three now-defunct professional minor-league hockey franchises.

=== Tacoma Tigers (1930–1931) ===
Tacoma Tigers
- League: Pacific Coast Hockey League
- Operated: 1928–1931
- Owner: H.A. Briggs
- Head coach: Mickey MacKay

Franchise history
- 1928–1930: Victoria Cubs
- 1930–1931: Tacoma Tigers

The Tacoma Tigers were Tacoma's first entry into professional hockey, and played in the Pacific Coast Hockey League for part of the 1930–31 season. The Tigers were founded in 1928 in Victoria, British Columbia as the Victoria Cubs, whose arena burnt down on November 10, 1929, following the 1928–29 season. The Cubs spent the 1929–30 season as a traveling team before being purchased by H.A. Briggs with the intention of relocation to Tacoma.

The team's stint representing Tacoma was a short one, as the team only played ten away games of their expected 35 game schedule before folding. The Tigers scored 12 goals and conceded 24 over the course of their two wins, seven loss, and one tie, two games of which were a double-header of shortened two-period games in Vancouver. The team was coached by Mickey MacKay.

Despite a deadline extension from the league, the Tigers were unable to procure funding for the planned construction of their new hockey arena in Tacoma, and thus were disbanded on January 1, 1931.

=== Tacoma Rockets (1946–1953) ===
The longest-lasting professional team to play in the city were the original Tacoma Rockets.

The Rockets name was resurrected from 1991 to 1995 in the new major junior Western Hockey League, until the team's relocation to Kelowna, British Columbia.

=== Tacoma Sabercats (1997–2002) ===
The Rockets were resurrected in the Western Hockey League in 1991 at the Tacoma Dome to record crowds, before moving to Kelowna, British Columbia in 1995. Filling this void, the Tacoma Sabercats formed in the now-defunct West Coast Hockey League in 1997.

Tacoma immediately emerged as a power in the WCHL, winning the regular season Northern Division title and reaching the league finals in its first season. However the Sabercats were defeated by the defending champion San Diego Gulls in the league's Taylor Cup finals.

The following season, 1998–99, Tacoma won its second WCHL Northern Division title and defeated the Gulls in the Taylor Cup finals, becoming the first team other than San Diego to win the WCHL title in the league's history. Although the Sabercats won the WCHL Northern Division a third time in 1999–2000, the team failed to win another league championship.

Despite a strong following in the Tacoma area with over 1,500 season ticket holders, the Sabercats were folded in May 2002 by owner Coach-Sports. They had been eliminated by the Idaho Steelheads in the 2002 WCHL playoffs immediately before ceasing operations.
