= Mercer Arena =

Demolished entertainment venue in Seattle, Washington

Coordinates: 47°37′26″N 122°20′58″W

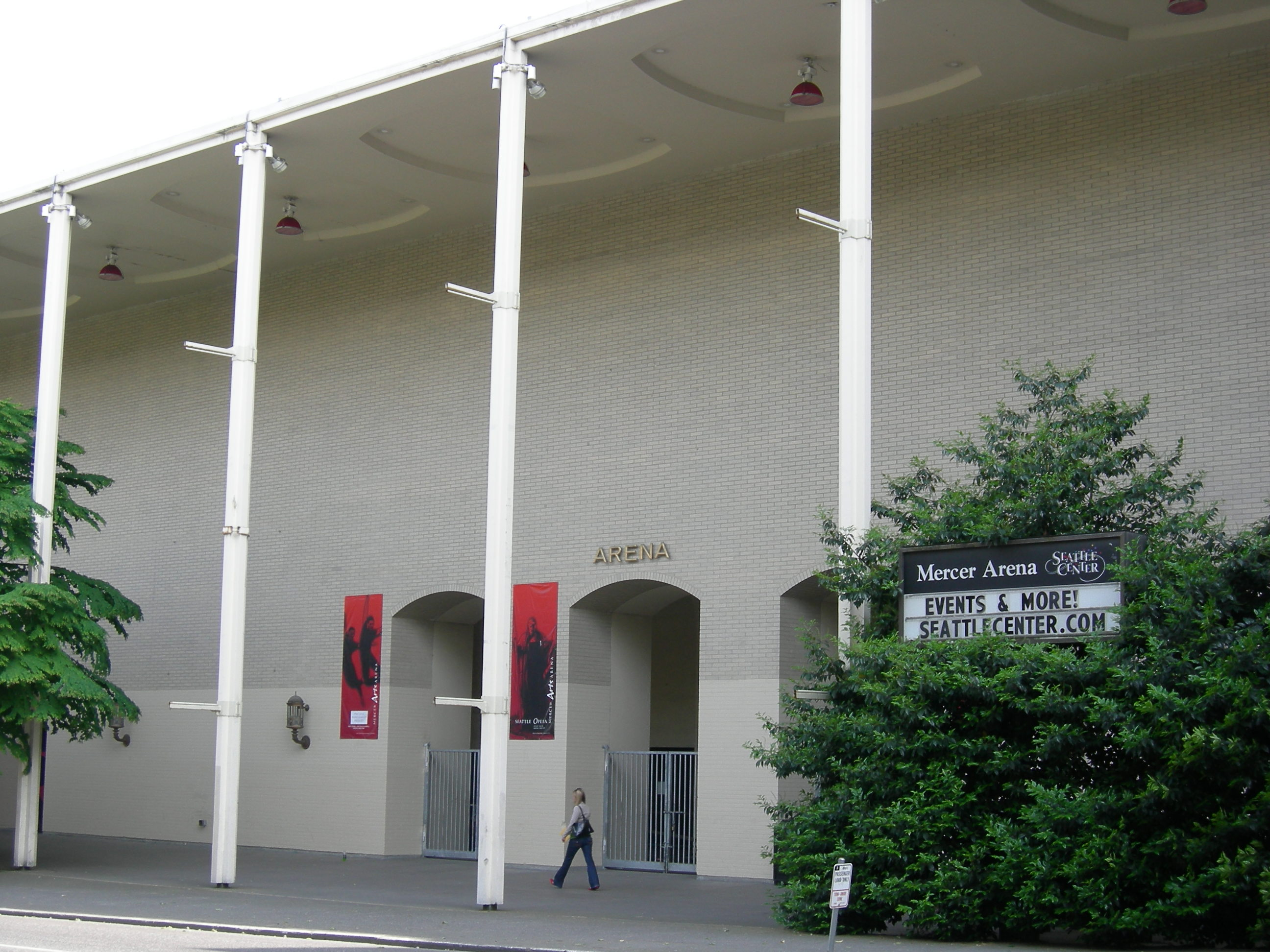
- Outside of the closed Mercer Arena in 2007
- Interactive map of Mercer Arena
- Former names: Exposition Building; Civic Ice Arena; Seattle Center Arena
- Address: 363 Mercer Street
- Location: Seattle, Washington, U.S.
- Capacity: 5000

Construction
- Opened: 1927
- Closed: 2003
- Demolished: 2017

Tenants
- Seattle Eskimos (PCHL), 1928–1931; Seattle Sea Hawks/Olympics (NWHL/PCHL), 1933–1941; Seattle Totems (WHL), 1958–1964; Seattle Breakers/Thunderbirds (WHL), 1977–1995; Seattle SeaDogs (CISL), 1995; Seattle Reign (ABL), 1996–1998

Mercer Arena, previously known as the Exposition Building, Civic Ice Arena, and Seattle Center Arena, was a performing arts venue situated in Seattle Center in Seattle, Washington. Constructed in 1927 next to the Seattle Civic Auditorium (now the site of the Seattle Opera House), it was built at a cost of $1 million. The arena was located at Mercer Street and 4th Avenue North and predated the Seattle Center Coliseum by about 35 years. Mercer Arena was demolished in 2017.

== Origins and usage as a venue (1928–2003) ==
Initially conceived as an ice arena, the facility eventually became a large multi-purpose venue. It was nicknamed "the House of Suds" because of the large underwriting contribution of local tavern owner James Osborne. The name changed to Seattle Center Arena after the Century 21 Exposition (1962 World's Fair). In 1995 the name changed again, to the Mercer Arena, due to its location on Mercer Street and to avoid confusion with the Seattle Center Coliseum's new name, KeyArena.

Its large, flexible spaces allowed an average of 183 events each year. From 1958 until 1964 it was first home to the Seattle Totems of the minor professional Western Hockey League. The Seattle Thunderbirds of the modern junior Western Hockey League originally played their games in Mercer Arena before using the Coliseum beginning in 1989, although they continued to use Mercer Arena on a part-time basis (except for the 1994–95 season, when all games were played at the arena due to the coliseum undergoing renovations); in 1992 it played host to the CHL's Memorial Cup when games at the Coliseum failed to draw their expected crowds. It hosted the Seattle SeaDogs of the Continental Indoor Soccer League in 1995 prior to their move to KeyArena. From 1996 to 1998, it was the home of the Seattle Reign, the city's first professional women's basketball franchise, a part of the American Basketball League.

From 2000 to 2003, it was used as a temporary venue for the Seattle Opera and Pacific Northwest Ballet during construction of McCaw Hall, the new opera house. $6 million of improvements were put into the building to house the opera. New additions like heating and cooling systems, orchestra pit, and carpet were installed. The general infrastructure was reworked as well. The general purpose stage was reworked to a more traditional opera setting, old pipes that were used to freeze water for the ice rink were buried or removed, and the drop ceiling was removed creating a more acoustically sound environment. As the opera's occupation was only temporary, structural issues were not addressed and the arena was shut down after 2003.

For concerts, it had a capacity between 5,000 and 8,000 depending on seating configuration.

The building sat dormant from 2003 until its demolition in 2017.

== Redevelopment ==
On December 4, 2007, Mayor Greg Nickels announced a proposal to convert the arena into use by the Seattle Opera. The building will contain administrative offices, rehearsal spaces and workshops for the company. Sharing a common wall with the opera's performance venue at McCaw Hall, the arena would allow sets to be built within the workshop, then transported directly to the stage. This would be the first company in the world to have such an amenity. The Seattle Opera moved to lease the arena from the city, hoping to raise enough to convert the arena; the Great Recession of the late 2000s forced the opera company to put the project on hold in 2008, and to negotiate a lease-option extension with the city in 2010.

In February 2016, the Seattle Opera unveiled plans for a $60 million facility to replace the Mercer Arena. The new building, named the Seattle Opera at the Center, is planned to be four stories tall and house 105,000 square feet (9,800 m^{2}) of space for offices, storage, scene assembly, and community spaces. The condemned arena was demolished in 2017.

Preceded by Kamloops Memorial Arena	Home of the Seattle Thunderbirds; 1977 – 1994 (with Seattle Center Coliseum); 1994 – 1995	Succeeded by KeyArena
