= List of Chicago Blackhawks statistics and records =

This article is a list of statistics and records relating to the Chicago Blackhawks. The Chicago Blackhawks are a professional ice hockey team that joined the National Hockey League (NHL) in 1926 as one of the Original Six. The Blackhawks, who were known as the Black Hawks 1926 to 1986, has won the Stanley Cup six times in their 99-year history. This list encompasses the major honours won by the Blackhawks, records set by the team, their managers and their players, and details the team's NHL performances.

== Team honors and achievements ==
The Chicago Blackhawks have won the Stanley Cup, the highest team honor in the National Hockey League, on six occasions. They also won the Clarence S. Campbell Bowl six times as the Western Conference champions, most recently in 2014-15. The Blackhawks won the Prince of Wales Trophy in 1966–67 as the regular season champions, then again in 1969–70 as the East Division champions. In 1990–91 and again in 2012-13 the team won the Presidents' Trophy for accumulating the most points in the regular season.

=== Stanley Cup ===
- 1933–34
- 1937–38
- 1960–61
- 2009–10
- 2012–13
- 2014–15

=== Prince of Wales Trophy ===
- 1966–67
- 1969–70

=== Clarence S. Campbell Bowl ===
- 1970–71
- 1971–72
- 1972–73
- 1991–92
- 2009–10
- 2012–13
- 2014–15

=== Presidents' Trophy ===
- 1990–91
- 2012–13

== Player records ==
=== Appearances ===
#	Name	Years	Regular season	Playoffs	Total
1	(Slovakia) Stan Mikita	1959–1979	1396	155	1551
2	(Canada) Duncan Keith	2005–2021	1192	135	1327
3	(United States) Patrick Kane	2007–2023	1161	136	1297
4	(Canada) Brent Seabrook	2005–2020	1114	123	1237
5	(Canada) Jonathan Toews	2007–2023	1067	137	1204
6	(Canada) Bobby Hull	1957–1972	1036	116	1152
7	(Canada) Eric Nesterenko	1956–1972	1013	115	1128
8	(Canada) Bob Murray	1975–1990	1008	112	1120
9	(United States) Doug Wilson	1977–1991	938	95	1033
10	(Canada) Denis Savard	1980–1990; 1995–1997	881	131	1012

=== Points ===
- Most goals in a season: 58, by Bobby Hull in 1968–69.
- Most assists in a season: 87, by Denis Savard in 1981–82 and 1987–88.
- Most points in a season: 131, by Denis Savard in 1987–88.

==== Top goal scorers ====
#	Name	Years	Regular season	Playoffs	Total
1	(Canada) Bobby Hull	1957–1972	604	62	666
2	(Slovakia) Stan Mikita	1959–1979	541	59	600
3	(United States) Patrick Kane	2007–2023	446	52	498
4	(Canada) Steve Larmer	1981–1993	406	45	451
5	(Canada) Denis Savard	1980–1990; 1995–1997	377	61	438
6	(Canada) Jonathan Toews	2006–2020	372	45	417
7	(Canada) Dennis Hull	1964–1977	298	33	331
8	(United States) Jeremy Roenick	1988–1996	267	35	302
9	(Canada) Patrick Sharp	2005–2015; 2017-2018	249	42	291
10	(United States) Tony Amonte	1994–2002	268	13	281

=== Goalies ===
==== All Time ====
- Wins – Tony Esposito – 423
- Losses – Tony Esposito – 302
- Shutouts – Tony Esposito – 76
- Games – Tony Esposito – 873
- Minutes – Tony Esposito – 51,734
- GAA – Charlie Gardiner – 2.02 (Min 100 games)
- Save % – Corey Crawford – .918 (Min 100 games)

==== Single season ====
- Wins – Ed Belfour – 43 (1990–91)
- Losses – Al Rollins – 47 (1953–54)
- Shutouts – Tony Esposito – 15 (1969–70)
- Games – Ed Belfour – 74 (1990–91)
- Minutes – Tony Esposito – 4,209 (1974-75)
- GAA – Charlie Gardiner – 1.64 (1933–34) min 20 games
- Save % – Tony Esposito – .934 (1971–72) min 20 games

=== Penalty minutes ===
- Most penalty minutes in a season: 408, by Mike Peluso in 1991–92.

== Team records ==
=== Goals ===
- Most goals scored in a season: 351 in 80 games, 1985–86.
- Fewest goals scored in a season:
  - 33 in 44 games, 1928–29.
  - 133 in 70 games, 1953–54.
- Most goals against in a season: 363 in 80 games, 1981–82.
- Fewest goals against in a season:
  - 77 in 44 games, 2012–13
  - 78 in 48 games, 1930–31.
  - 164 in 78 games, 1973–74.
  - 189 in 82 games, 2014–15.

=== Points ===
- Most points in a season:
  - 107 in 78 games, 1970–71
  - 107 in 78 games, 1971–72
  - 112 in 82 games, 2009–10
- Fewest points in a season:
  - 17 in 44 games, 1927–28
  - 31 in 70 games, 1953–54

=== Games ===
==== Record scores ====
- Record win: 12–0 against the Philadelphia Flyers at The Spectrum on January 30, 1969.
- Record defeat: 0–12 against the Detroit Red Wings at Joe Lewis Arena on December 4, 1987.

==== Consecutive results ====
- Record consecutive wins: 12 (from December 29, 2015 to present).
- Record consecutive defeats: 12 (from February 25, 1951 to March 25, 1951).
- Record consecutive games without a defeat: 15 (from January 14, 1967 to February 16, 1967 and from November 29, 1975 to December 3, 1975).
- Record consecutive games earning at least one point: 24 (from January 19, 2013 to March 9, 2013).
- Record consecutive games without a win: 21 (from December 17, 1950 to January 28, 1951).

==== Longest Game ====
- 116 minutes and 12 seconds (On May 19, 2015)
