= Irv Frew =

Scottish-born Canadian ice hockey player

- Born: August 16, 1907 Kilsyth, Scotland, UK
- Died: April 2, 1995 (aged 87)
- Height: 5 ft 10 in (178 cm)
- Weight: 180 lb (82 kg; 12 st 12 lb)
- Position: Defence
- Shot: Right
- Played for: Montreal Maroons; Montreal Canadiens; St. Louis Eagles
- Playing career: 1926–1941

Irvine Bell Frew (August 16, 1907 – April 2, 1995) was a Canadian ice hockey defenceman who played three seasons in the National Hockey League, for the Montreal Maroons, St. Louis Eagles and Montreal Canadiens between 1933 and 1936. The rest of his career, which lasted from 1926 to 1941, was spent in various minor leagues. As a junior player he won the 1926 Memorial Cup with the Calgary Canadians. Frew was born in Kilsyth, Scotland, but grew up in Calgary, Alberta.

== Career statistics ==
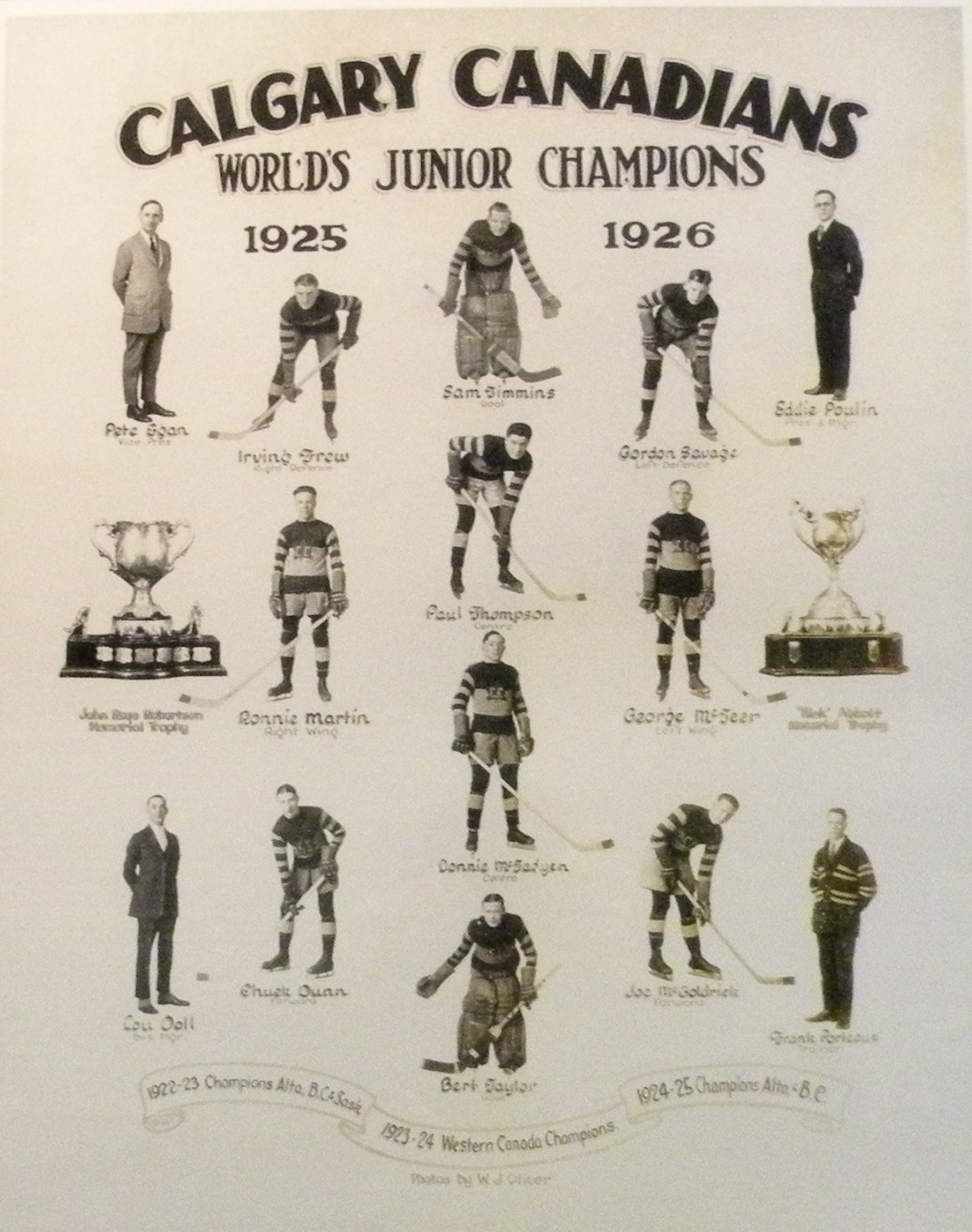
The 1925–26 Calgary Canadians. Frew is on the top row, second from left.

=== Regular season and playoffs ===
			Regular season					Playoffs
Season	Team	League	GP	G	A	Pts	PIM	GP	G	A	Pts	PIM
1925–26	Calgary Canadians	CCJHL	—	—	—	—	—	—	—	—	—	—
1925–26	Calgary Canadians	Mem-Cup	—	—	—	—	—	9	1	2	3	20
1926–27	Calgary Tigers	PHL	27	0	0	0	8	2	0	0	0	0
1927–28	Stratford Nationals	Can-Pro	41	6	1	7	72	5	1	0	1	12
1928–29	Buffalo Bisons	Can-Pro	24	1	1	2	43	—	—	—	—	—
1928–29	Toronto Millionaires	Can-Pro	20	2	0	2	34	2	0	0	0	12
1929–30	Cleveland Indians	IHL	41	3	3	6	61	6	0	0	0	8
1930–31	Cleveland Indians	IHL	45	3	5	8	59	—	—	—	—	—
1931–32	Cleveland Indians	IHL	9	1	0	1	31	—	—	—	—	—
1932–33	Cleveland Indians	IHL	19	2	0	2	56	—	—	—	—	—
1932–33	Quebec Castors	Can-Am	26	1	2	3	57	—	—	—	—	—
1933–34	Montreal Maroons	NHL	30	2	1	3	41	4	0	0	0	6
1933–34	Quebec Castors	Can-Am	14	3	1	4	16	—	—	—	—	—
1934–35	St. Louis Eagles	NHL	48	0	2	2	89	—	—	—	—	—
1935–36	Montreal Canadiens	NHL	18	0	2	2	16	—	—	—	—	—
1935–36	Springfield Indians	Can-Am	14	0	2	2	23	2	0	0	0	4
1936–37	Springfield Indians	IAHL	47	5	6	11	65	5	0	0	0	11
1937–38	Springfield Indians	IAHL	14	0	0	0	19	—	—	—	—	—
1937–38	Vancouver Lions	PCHL	10	0	1	1	25	6	0	0	0	22
1938–39	Spokane Clippers	PCHL	45	1	7	8	106	—	—	—	—	—
1939–40	Springfield Indians	IAHL	50	2	4	6	69	3	0	1	1	2
1940–41	St. Louis Flyers	AHA	39	6	5	11	37	9	1	0	1	17
NHL totals			96	2	5	7	146	4	0	0	0	0

== See also ==
- List of National Hockey League players from the United Kingdom
