= Ronnie Martin (ice hockey) =

Canadian ice hockey player

- Born: August 22, 1907; Calgary, Alberta, Canada
- Died: February 7, 1971 (aged 63); Riverside, California, USA
- Height: 5 ft 6 in (168 cm)
- Weight: 130 lb (59 kg; 9 st 4 lb)
- Position: Right wing
- Shot: Right
- Played for: New York Americans
- Playing career: 1926–1944

Ronald Dennis Grant Martin (August 22, 1907, in Calgary, Alberta – February 7, 1971) was a Canadian professional ice hockey player who played 94 games in the National Hockey League with the New York Americans between 1932 and 1934. The rest of his career, which lasted from 1926 to 1944, was spent in various minor leagues.

He was a younger brother of Calgary Tigers player Foley Martin.

== Career statistics ==
=== Regular season and playoffs ===
			Regular season					Playoffs
Season	Team	League	GP	G	A	Pts	PIM	GP	G	A	Pts	PIM
1923–24	Calgary Canadians	CCJHL	—	—	—	—	—	—	—	—	—	—
1923–24	Calgary Canadians	M-Cup	—	—	—	—	—	7	0	0	0	1
1924–25	Calgary Canadians	CCJHL	—	—	—	—	—	—	—	—	—	—
1924–25	Calgary Canadians	M-Cup	—	—	—	—	—	2	0	0	0	2
1925–26	Calgary Canadians	CCJHL	—	—	—	—	—	—	—	—	—	—
1925–26	Calgary Canadians	M-Cup	—	—	—	—	—	9	6	2	8	4
1926–27	Calgary Tigers	PHL	32	13	5	18	20	2	1	0	1	0
1927–28	Kitchener Millionaires	Can-Pro	1	0	0	0	0	—	—	—	—	—
1927–28	Niagara Falls Cataracts	Can-Pro	34	13	5	18	20	—	—	—	—	—
1928–29	Toronto Millionaires	Can-Pro	16	4	1	5	14	—	—	—	—	—
1928–29	Buffalo Bisons	Can-Pro	27	7	1	8	12	—	—	—	—	—
1929–30	Buffalo Bisons	IHL	40	22	3	25	33	7	2	1	3	13
1930–31	Buffalo Bisons	IHL	48	28	13	41	24	6	1	3	4	0
1931–32	Buffalo Bisons	IHL	46	15	18	33	42	6	3	2	5	2
1932–33	New York Americans	NHL	47	5	7	12	6	—	—	—	—	—
1933–34	New York Americans	NHL	47	8	9	17	30	—	—	—	—	—
1934–35	Syracuse Stars	IHL	43	6	12	18	18	2	0	1	1	2
1935–36	Edmonton Eskimos	NWHL	40	11	13	24	13	—	—	—	—	—
1935–36	Portland Buckaroos	NWHL	—	—	—	—	—	3	1	0	1	0
1935–36	Vancouver Lions	NWHL	—	—	—	—	—	2	3	1	4	0
1936–37	Portland Buckaroos	PCHL	39	9	9	18	10	3	3	3	6	2
1937–38	Portland Buckaroos	PCHL	41	6	15	21	16	2	2	0	2	7
1938–39	Portland Buckaroos	PCHL	43	18	18	36	10	5	3	0	3	2
1939–40	Portland Buckaroos	PCHL	39	14	11	25	12	5	1	2	3	2
1940–41	Portland Buckaroos	PCHL	41	8	8	16	18	—	—	—	—	—
1943–44	Portland Decleros	NNDHL	16	12	13	25	2	—	—	—	—	—
1943–44	Portland Buckaroos	PCHL	—	—	—	—	—	2	3	1	4	0
IHL totals			177	71	46	117	117	21	6	7	13	17
PCHL totals			203	55	61	116	66	17	12	6	18	13
NHL totals			94	13	16	29	36	—	—	—	—	—
