= Body check =

Body check may refer to:

- Checking (ice hockey)
- Physical examination
