= 1933–34 NHL transactions =

The following is a list of all team-to-team transactions that have occurred in the National Hockey League (NHL) during the 1933–34 NHL season. It lists which team each player has been traded to and for which player(s) or other consideration(s), if applicable.

== Transactions ==
June 1, 1933	To Montreal Maroons Vern Ayres	To New York Americans $6,000 cash
September 1, 1933	To Detroit Red Wings Wilf Starr	To New York Americans cash
October 1, 1933	To Montreal Maroons Ted Graham	To Chicago Black Hawks Lionel Conacher
October 1, 1933	To Toronto Maple Leafs George Hainsworth	To Montreal Canadiens Lorne Chabot
October 4, 1933	To Toronto Maple Leafs Hec Kilrea	To Ottawa Senators Bob Gracie $10,000 cash
October 4, 1933	To Boston Bruins Bob Gracie	To Ottawa Senators Bud Cook; Percy Galbraith; Teddy Saunders
October 10, 1933	To New York Rangers rights to Jean Pusie	To Montreal Canadiens $3,000 cash
October 19, 1933	To Detroit Red Wings Gene Carrigan	To Chicago Black Hawks Leroy Goldsworthy; Frank Waite
October 19, 1933	To Montreal Canadiens Wilf Cude	To Philadelphia Quakers cash
October 22, 1933	To Ottawa Senators Albert Leduc	To Montreal Canadiens cash
October 23, 1933	To Detroit Red Wings rights to Gord Pettinger	To New York Rangers cash
October 30, 1933	To Detroit Red Wings Melville Vail	To New York Rangers Frank Peters
November 1, 1933	To Boston Bruins Bert McInenly	To Ottawa Senators cash
November 1, 1933	To Montreal Maroons Stew Adams	To Toronto Maple Leafs Al Huggins
November 13, 1933	To Detroit Red Wings Fred Robertson	To Toronto Maple Leafs $6,500 cash
November 26, 1933	To Detroit Red Wings Cooney Weiland	To Ottawa Senators Carl Voss
December 1, 1933	To Detroit Red Wings Teddy Saunders	To Ottawa Senators cash
December 9, 1933	To New York Americans loan of Benny Grant	To Toronto Maple Leafs unknown
December 18, 1933	To Boston Bruins Babe Siebert	To New York Rangers Roy Burmister; Vic Ripley
January 2, 1934	To Detroit Red Wings loan of Wilf Cude	To Montreal Canadiens cash
January 2, 1934	To Montreal Maroons Stewart Evans	To Detroit Red Wings Ted Graham
January 3, 1934	To New York Rangers Duke Dukowski	To New York Americans cash
January 11, 1934	To Boston Bruins Lloyd Gross; George Patterson	To New York Americans Art Chapman; Bob Gracie
February 13, 1934	To Detroit Red Wings Lloyd Gross	To Boston Bruins $2,500 cash
February 15, 1934	To New York Rangers loan of Albert Leduc	To Ottawa Senators cash
April 9, 1934	To Montreal Canadiens Albert Leduc	To Ottawa Senators cash
April 11, 1934	To New York Rangers Alex Levinsky	To Toronto Maple Leafs cash
