= Tony Savage =

Tony Savage may refer to:

- Anthony Savage (1893–1970), American basketball and baseball player and coach of American football and basketball
- Tony Savage (American football) (born 1967), American football defensive tackle
- Gordon Savage (ice hockey) (1906–1974), known as Tony, ice hockey player
