= Checking (ice hockey) =

Defensive move in ice hockey

Checking in ice hockey is any of a number of defensive techniques aimed at disrupting an opponent with possession of the puck or separating them from the puck entirely. Most types are not subject to penalty.

== Types ==
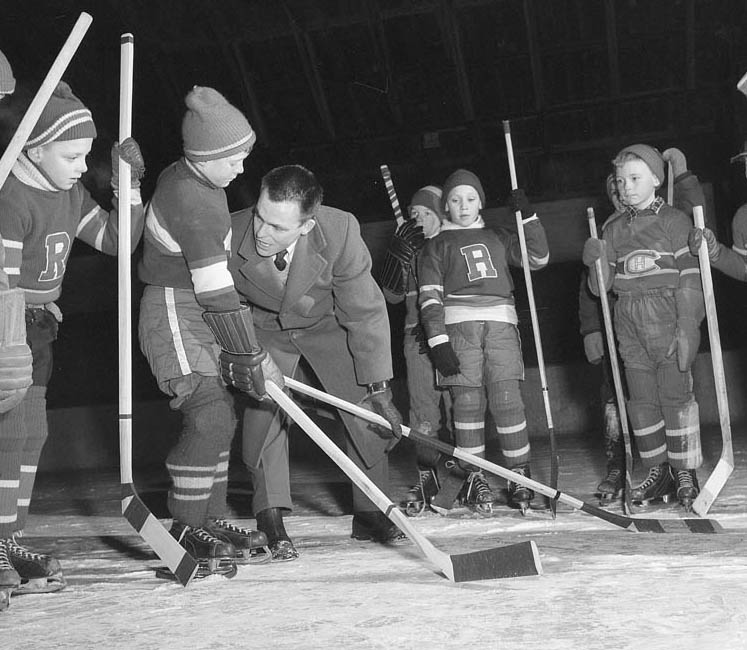
Young boys are taught proper body checking technique. (c. 1956)

=== Body checking ===
A player drives the shoulder, upper arm and hip and elbow, equally into the opponent to separate them from the puck, using the body to knock an opponent against the boards or to the ice. This is often referred to as simply checking or hitting and is only permitted against an opponent with possession of the puck. Body checking can be penalized when performed recklessly.

In women's IIHF ice hockey and in non-checking leagues, body checking is considered an "illegal hit" , and is punishable by a minor penalty, major penalty and automatic game misconduct, or match penalty. Body checking was allowed at the first women's world ice hockey championship in 1990 but has been considered illegal since in almost all leagues. The Swedish Women's Hockey League began allowing body checking in its 2022–23 season, the Professional Women's Hockey League in North America has allowed it since that league began play in January 2024, and the PostFinance Women's League in Switzerland has allowed it as of its 2025-26 season. Even in those leagues, body checking is heavily regulated.

=== Hip-checking ===
A player drops to a near-crouching stance and swings his hips toward an opposing player, sending the opponent off balance, often falling to the ice. This is performed most commonly against the boards. A hip-check at or below the knees is called "clipping"; it is considered an infraction in the National Hockey League.

=== Shoulder-checking ===
A player puts a shoulder into an opponent to muscle the other player out of position. The elbow must be tucked in or the act may be considered elbowing, which is against the rules and can result in a penalty.

=== Poke checking ===
Using the stick to poke the puck away from an opponent. For example, a defensive player may hit the puck out of the puck carrier's possession before making physical contact. This is a common form of checking for goalies to use against opponents that approach closely, since they must avoid moving their bodies far from the goal.

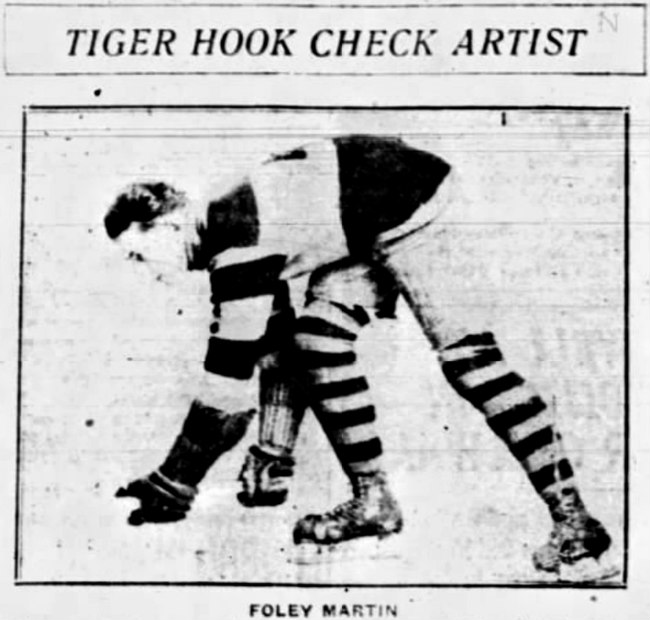
Foley Martin displaying the hook check while with the Calgary Tigers.

=== Hook checking ===
Using the stick in a hooking manner on the ice surface to retrieve the puck from opponent players. Hook checking should not be confused with the other infraction hooking.

=== Sweep checking ===
Using the stick in a sweeping motion to knock the puck away from opponents or deter them from passing.

=== Stick checking ===
Using the stick to interfere with an opponent's stick.

=== Forechecking ===
Skating done in the offensive zone, often to recover possession of the puck after a dump in or turnover.

=== Backchecking ===
Rushing back to the defensive zone in response to an opposing team's attack. While behind the attacker, a defender may try to make physical contact with the puck carrier to check so that the opposing team may regain control of the puck.

=== Cross-checking ===
The act of checking an opponent with the shaft of the stick held in both hands. This is illegal and earns a minor, major, misconduct, or match penalty depending on the severity of the infraction.

=== Lift checking ===
Using the stick to lift or knock an opponent's stick upwards followed immediately by an attempt to steal the puck. This may also be used by a defender to keep an attacker from deflecting shots when both players are positioned in front of the net.

=== Press checking ===
Using the stick to stop or control the movement of an opponent's stick by placing pressure over the top of the opponent's stick.

== Body checking in other winter team sports ==
Body checking is disallowed in the winter team sports of bandy, rink bandy, rinkball, ringette, spongee, and some broomball and ice hockey leagues, though other forms and levels of body contact may occur during play in each of the respective sports.

Although some broomball leagues allow the use of body checking, the sport in all of its formats and variants uses shoes or shoes with special soles for traction on the ice and does not use any type of ice skate. As a result, the body checking style used in broomball leagues that allow it are different from the style used in ice hockey and more closely resemble the style seen used in either lacrosse or box lacrosse.

== Rules on checking ==
=== Illegal checking ===
Charging, hitting from behind and boarding are examples of illegal hits. "Charging shall mean the actions of a player who, as a result of distance traveled, shall violently check an opponent in any manner. A “charge” may be the result of a check into the boards, into the goal frame, or in open ice". Boarding is when a check violently throws a defenseless player into the boards. Due to their dangerous nature and increased likelihood of causing serious injury, these hits can have penalties ranging from a minor two-minute penalty to a major and game misconduct.

Any form of body checking is not allowed in leagues with young children. Men's amateur leagues typically allow checking unless stipulated otherwise in league rules. Some intramural university leagues do not permit body checking, in order to avoid injury and incidents of fighting. "Leaning" against opponents is an alternative to body checking but can be penalized for holding if abused. Many studies have been done regarding injuries in hockey that have caused stricter rule enforcement in the 2010s. There have been decreases in the number of concussions and other serious injuries since these changes.

Beginning with the 2010–11 NHL season, any form of "lateral or blind side hit to an opponent, where the player's head is targeted and/or the principal point of contact" (which is known as an illegal check to the head) became prohibited. That season, an illegal check to the head is punishable with either a major penalty and a game misconduct, or a match penalty. This new rule was instituted as a result of concussion injuries to NHL players in previous seasons.

One season later, the criteria were changed so that the opponent's head was both the principal point of contact and targeted. That hit is punishable with either a two-minute minor or a match penalty. In the 2013–14 NHL season, the rule was clarified to "A hit resulting in contact with an opponent's head where the head was the main point of contact and such contact to the head was avoidable is not permitted." As mentioned before, that is punishable with either a two-minute minor or a match penalty.

=== New NHL standard of rule enforcement, 2005–06 ===
For the 2005–06 season, the NHL instituted stricter enforcement of many checking violations that in previous seasons would not have been penalized. The intent of the new standard of enforcement was to fundamentally alter the way ice hockey is played, rewarding speed and agility over brute strength, as well as increasing opportunities for scoring and minimizing stoppage of play. However, it is unclear how expanding the definition of a penalty would minimize the stoppage of play, as penalty calls entail play stoppage. One explanation may be that more clearly defined rules give players more distinct boundaries on penalties, resulting in fewer penalties. The intended result is a faster-paced game with generally higher scores than in previous years.

=== New USA Hockey rules on checking, 2011–12 ===
Beginning in the 2011–12 season, USA Hockey moved the age of legal body checking from 12U to 14U. The discussion of this rule change began with a look into Peewee (12U) and Squirt (10U) levels of hockey. Through observation, it was clear that Squirts skate more aggressively and try to play in the correct manner. Peewees in similar situations would either let the opponent get the puck first so they can check them or hold back so they don't get hit themselves. Injury was not an initial concern, but with research it was brought into the discussion. Research shows that the 11-year-old brain has not developed skills to anticipate. As a result, Peewees acquire injuries four times more in checking vs. non-checking hockey.

== See also ==
- Neutral zone trap
- Tackle - similar concept in football codes
