= Calgary Canadians =

Former ice hockey team in Canada

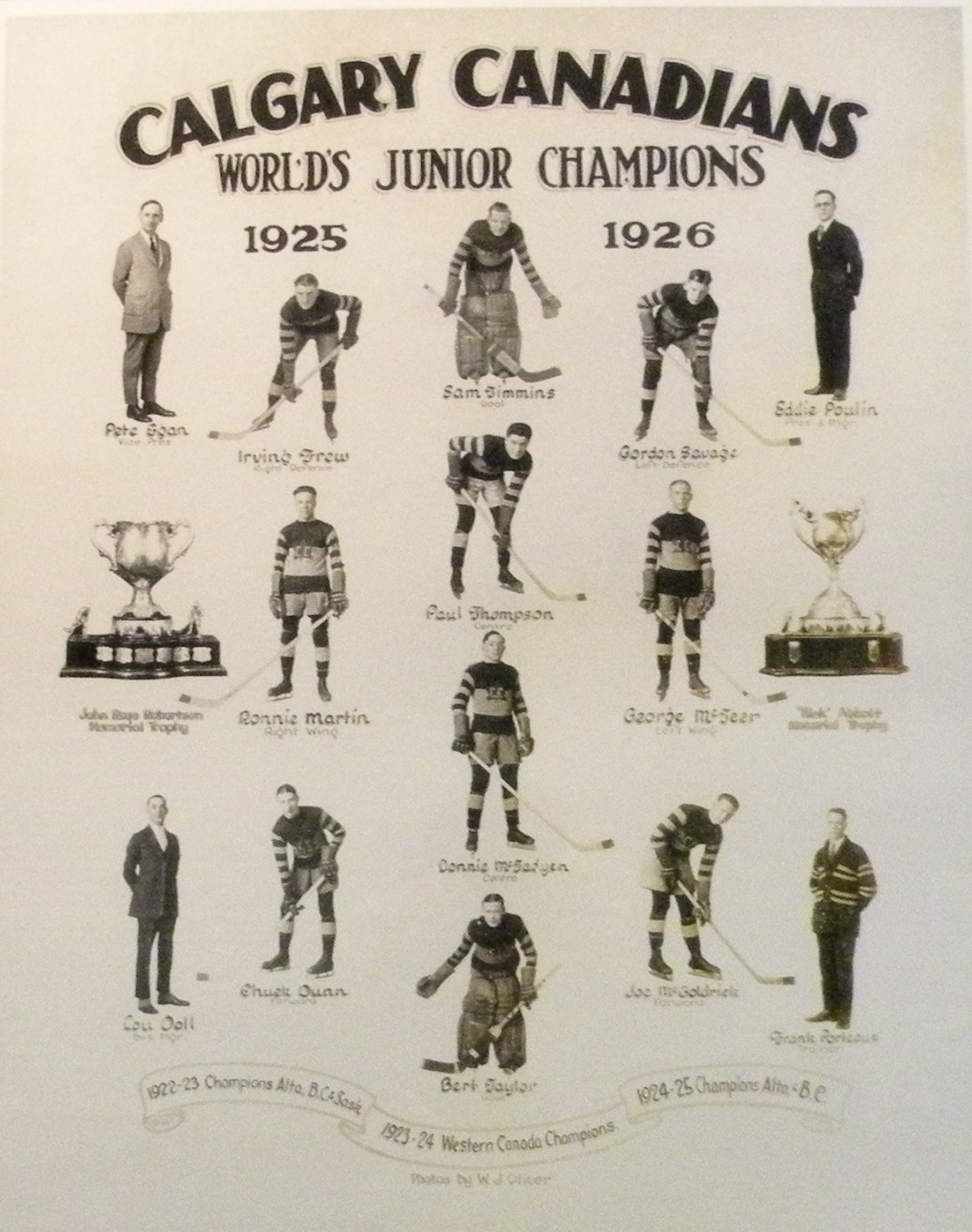
1925–26 Memorial Cup championship team

The Calgary Canadians were a junior ice hockey team that played in Calgary, Alberta, Canada. In 1924, they became the first team from Alberta to play for the Memorial Cup, and in 1926, the first to win it.

In 1924, the Canadians won the Western Canadian championship, the Abbott Cup, for the first time. They went on to face the Owen Sound Greys, Eastern Canada's champion in a two-game, total-goal series in Winnipeg, Manitoba. The Greys won the first game 5–3, and tied the second 2–2 to win the Memorial Cup.

The Canadians returned two years later to face off against Queen's University in the 1926 Memorial Cup. This time, the tournament was a best of three games format, again held in Winnipeg. After splitting the first two games, the Canadians won the third game 3-2. As of 2010, they remain the only Memorial Cup champion to come from Calgary.

== Championships ==
1926 Memorial Cup Champions

== NHL alumni ==
Five players from the 1926 Canadians went on to play in the National Hockey League: Irv Frew, Ronnie Martin, Don McFadyen, Tony Savage and Paul Thompson. Additionally, Hockey Hall of Famer Sweeney Schriner was a member of the Canadians in 1930 and 1931.

== See also ==
- Ice hockey in Calgary
