= Kenneth Thompson (ice hockey) =

British ice hockey player

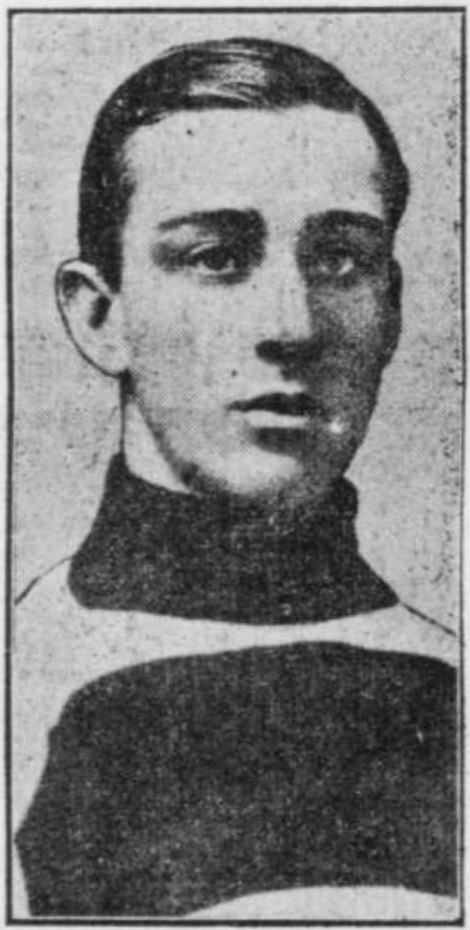
- Thompson c. 1915
- Born: 1895 Oakengates, England, GBR
- Died: 1931 (aged 35–36) Mansfield, Ohio, U.S.
- Height: 5 ft 10 in (178 cm)
- Weight: 160 lb (73 kg; 11 st 6 lb)
- Position: Left wing
- Shot: Left
- Played for: Montreal Wanderers
- Playing career: 1913–1918

Kenworthy James "Ken" Thompson (1895–1931) was a British-born Canadian professional ice hockey player. Born in Oakengates, Shropshire, United Kingdom, Thompson immigrated to Montreal, Quebec, where he developed a passion for the sport. He began his hockey career playing several seasons at the amateur level in Montreal.

Thompson eventually made the jump to professional hockey, joining the Montreal Wanderers. He played two seasons with the Wanderers, starting with the 1916–17 season campaign—the final season of the National Hockey Association (NHA), which would soon be succeeded by a new league. When the National Hockey League (NHL) was established in 1917, Thompson remained with the Wanderers and took part in their inaugural NHL season, appearing in one game.

== Playing career ==
During the 1916–17 season, Thompson played 14 games for the Montreal Wanderers in what would be the final year of the NHA, the predecessor to the NHL. He made a single appearance in the NHL, on 26 December 1917, against the Ottawa Senators. Unfortunately, the Wanderers’ time in the NHL was short-lived. A fire destroyed their home arena, the Montreal Arena, just a few days later, and with limited options and resources, the team was forced to withdraw from the league. This effectively marked the end of Thompson’s professional hockey career.

Before turning professional, Thompson played for several notable amateur teams, including Montreal Light Heat & Power, Université Laval, and the Montreal All-Montreal team. These experiences helped prepare him for the professional ranks and allowed him to compete at a high level during a transformative era for the sport.

== Career statistics ==
=== Regular season and playoffs ===
			Regular season					Playoffs
Season	Team	League	GP	G	A	Pts	PIM	GP	G	A	Pts	PIM
1913–14	Montreal HLP	MTMHL	10	7	0	7	15	—	—	—	—	—
1913–14	Montreal Shamrocks	MCHL	1	0	0	0	0	—	—	—	—	—
1913–14	Université Laval	MTMHL	3	0	3	3	—	1	0	0	0	0
1914–15	All-Montreal	MCHL	11	14	0	14	9	—	—	—	—	—
1915–16	Université Laval	MCHL	10	8	0	8	6	1	0	0	0	0
1916–17	Montreal Wanderers	NHA	14	1	0	1	8	—	—	—	—	—
1917–18	Montreal Wanderers	NHL	1	0	0	0	0	—	—	—	—	—
NHA totals			14	1	0	1	8	—	—	—	—	—
NHL totals			1	0	0	0	0	—	—	—	—	—

== See also ==
- List of National Hockey League players from the United Kingdom
- List of players who played only one game in the NHL
