= List of National Hockey League players born in the United Kingdom =

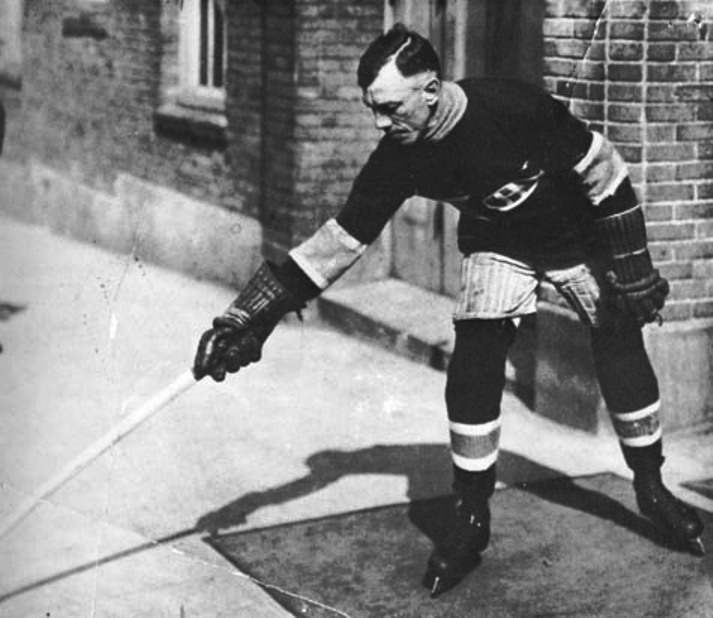
Joe Hall, born in Staffordshire, won the Stanley Cup twice during the National Hockey Association era, and was inducted into the Hockey Hall of Fame in 1961.

The National Hockey League (NHL) is a major professional ice hockey league which operates in Canada and the United States. Since its inception in 1917–18, 53 players born within the current borders of the United Kingdom have taken part. None of them, however, were trained within the country. Of these players 23 are from England, 21 from Scotland, 5 (Note: Kirk, McFadden and McManus were born in Ireland, UK. Northern Ireland came into existence after their births, in 1921.) from Northern Ireland, and 4 from Wales. Steve Thomas and Owen Nolan played over 1,000 regular season games, while Thomas and Steve Smith are the only ones to have appeared in over 100 playoff games. All three players finished their careers in the 21st century. The only player born in Britain currently playing in the NHL is Nathan Walker of the St. Louis Blues.

The modern form of ice hockey is generally considered to have begun in the mid-19th century. One of the first games to use a puck was played by a group of Englishmen from the Royal Canadian Rifle Regiment in Kingston, Ontario. In the United Kingdom, a five team league was established in 1903, while Great Britain was one of the founding members of the International Ice Hockey Federation five years later. The game was first administered by the British Ice Hockey Association, from 1914 until 1999, when Ice Hockey UK took over. In the early part of the 20th century the Great Britain national team enjoyed some success: they won gold at the 1936 Olympics, improving on their result of bronze twelve years earlier; won medals at three World Championships (bronze in 1935, and silver in 1937 and 1938), and won the first European Championships in 1910. The British team's heavy reliance on Canadian-trained players during its 1936 Olympic run was especially controversial, and prompted a protest from Canadian hockey officials.

Two players born in the United Kingdom participated in the first season of the NHL. Ken Thompson had played the previous season for the Montreal Wanderers in the National Hockey Association (NHA), and played one game in the NHL before the Wanderers disbanded shortly after their home rink burnt down. Joe Hall had also played in the NHA prior to the NHL: he spent eight years playing for the Montreal Shamrocks and the Quebec Bulldogs, and won the Stanley Cup twice with the latter side. He joined the Montreal Canadiens for the first season of the NHL. Hall competed in the 1919 Stanley Cup Final which were cancelled when most of his league champion Canadiens contracted Spanish influenza, and Hall died from flu-induced pneumonia shortly after. In 1961, he became the second player born in the United Kingdom to have been inducted into the Hockey Hall of Fame. (Note: From the United Kingdom, only England and Scotland are represented in the Hockey Hall of Fame; Joe Hall is the only player from England, and Charlie Gardiner is the only player from Scotland.)

The first Hall of Famer born in the UK was Charlie Gardiner, inducted in 1945. Described as "one of the game's preeminent goaltenders during the 1920s and 1930s," he played seven seasons in the NHL with the Chicago Black Hawks. He won the Vezina Trophy on two occasions, and was named team captain for the 1933–34 season, leading his team to win their first Stanley Cup. It was the only time a goaltender had captained a Cup-winning side. Just over two months after the Stanley Cup victory, Gardiner died of a brain hemorrhage.

== Players ==
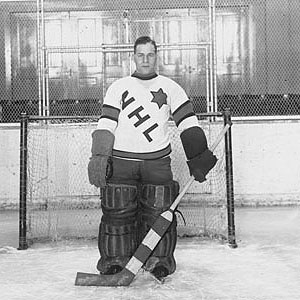
Charlie Gardiner, born in Edinburgh, won the Vezina Trophy in 1932 and 1934, and was inducted into the Hockey Hall of Fame in 1945.

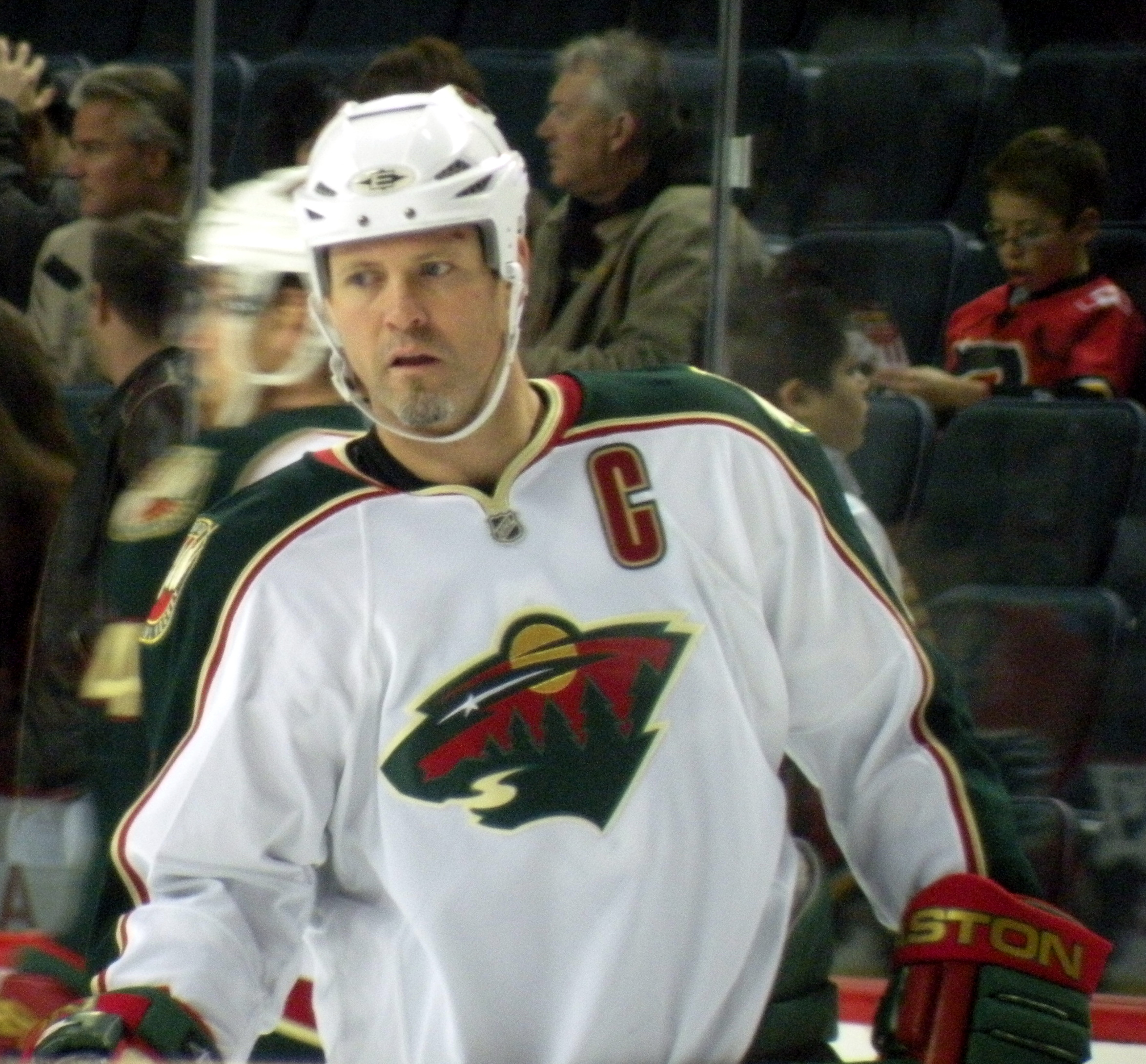
Owen Nolan, who was born in Northern Ireland, won Olympic gold for Canada.

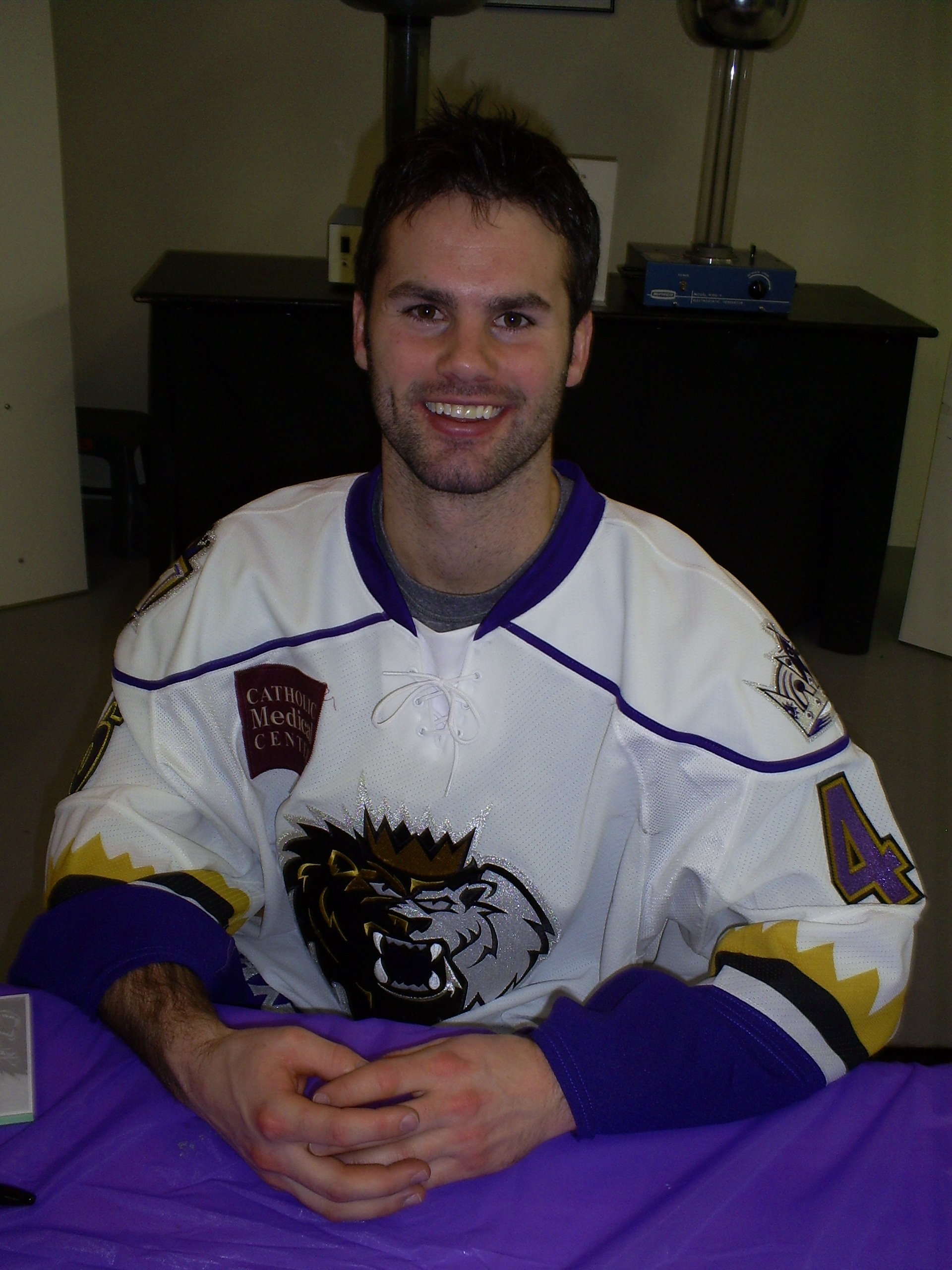
Daniel Taylor played 4 games in the NHL with the Los Angeles Kings and Ottawa Senators.

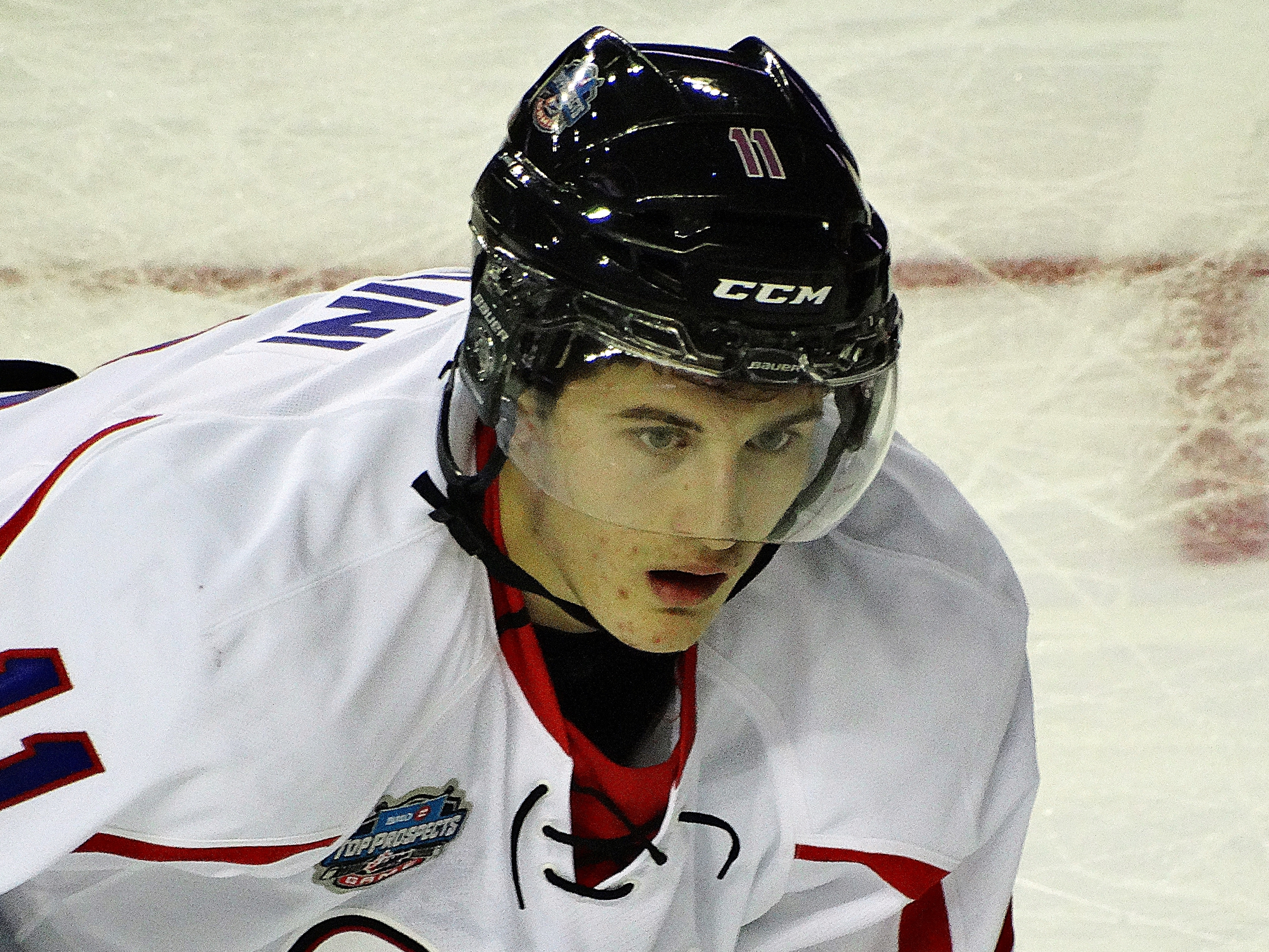
Brendan Perlini, who made his NHL debut in 2016 with the Arizona Coyotes. Currently with the Edmonton Oilers since 2021.

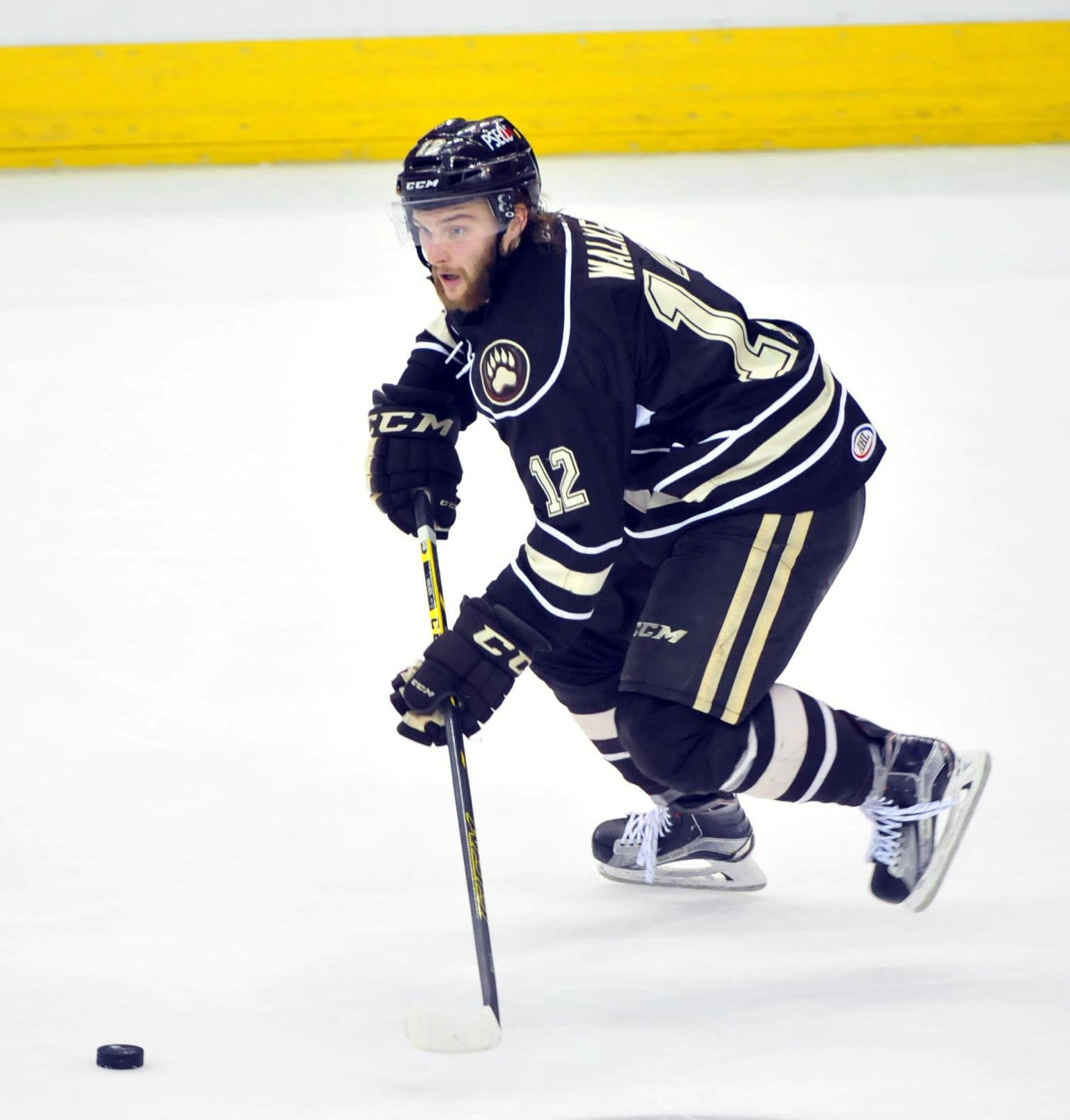
Nathan Walker, born in Wales and raised in Australia, made his NHL debut in 2017 with the Washington Capitals. He's currently with the St. Louis Blues

Key

- Pos – Position, G (Goaltender), D (Defenceman), LW (Left wing), C (Centre), RW (Right wing)
- RS – Number of regular season games played in the NHL
- PO – Number of playoff games played in the NHL
- † – Player has been inducted into the Hockey Hall of Fame

Name	City	Country	Pos	Debut team	Seasons active	RS	PO	Ref
Name	Birthplace		Pos	Debut team	Seasons active	Games played		Ref
Tom Hodges	Shrewsbury	England	G	Anaheim Ducks	2021–2022	1	0	
Andy Aitkenhead	Glasgow	Scotland	G	New York Rangers	1932–1935	106	10	
Tom Anderson	Edinburgh	Scotland	LW	Detroit Red Wings	1934–1942	319	16	
Red Beattie	Ibstock	England	LW	Boston Bruins	1930–1939	334	24	
Chuck Blair	Edinburgh	Scotland	RW	Toronto Maple Leafs	1948–1949	1	0	
Adam Brown	Johnstone	Scotland	LW	Detroit Red Wings	1941–1952	391	26	
Kevin Brown	Birmingham	England	RW	Los Angeles Kings	1994–2000	64	1	
George Carey	Glasgow	Scotland	RW	Quebec Bulldogs	1919–1924	72	0	
Gordie Clark	Glasgow	Scotland	RW	Boston Bruins	1974–1976	8	1	
Jim Conacher	Motherwell	Scotland	C	Detroit Red Wings	1945–1953	328	19	
Bobby Connors	Glasgow	Scotland	LW	New York Americans	1926–1930	78	2	
Wilf Cude	Barry	Wales	G	Philadelphia Quakers	1930–1941	282	19	
Byron Dafoe	Worthing	England	G	Washington Capitals	1992–2004	415	27	
Jack Evans	Morriston	Wales	D	New York Rangers	1948–1963	752	56	
Sid Finney	Banbridge	Northern Ireland	C	Chicago Black Hawks	1951–1954	59	7	
Sandy Fitzpatrick	Paisley	Scotland	C	New York Rangers	1964–1968	22	12	
Irv Frew	Kilsyth	Scotland	D	Montreal Maroons	1933–1936	96	4	
Charlie Gardiner †	Edinburgh	Scotland	G	Chicago Black Hawks	1927–1934	316	21	
Alex Gray	Glasgow	Scotland	RW	New York Rangers	1927–1929	50	13	
George Grigor	Edinburgh	Scotland	C	Chicago Black Hawks	1943–1944	2	1	
Joe Hall †	Staffordshire	England	D	Montreal Canadiens	1917–1919	38	7	
Alan Hepple	Blaydon-on-Tyne	England	D	New Jersey Devils	1983–1986	3	0	
Ken Hodge	Birmingham	England	RW	Chicago Black Hawks	1964–1978	881	97	
Lou Holmes	Rushall	England	C	Chicago Black Hawks	1931–1933	59	2	
Walter Jackson	Ibstock	England	LW	New York Americans	1932–1936	84	0	
Bobby Kirk	Doagh	Ireland	RW	New York Rangers	1937–1938	39	0	
Peter Lee	Ellesmere	England	RW	Pittsburgh Penguins	1977–1983	431	19	
Norman Mann	Bradford	England	RW	Toronto Maple Leafs	1938–1941	31	2	
Sam McAdam	Stirling	Scotland	C	New York Rangers	1930–1931	5	0	
Jim McFadden	Belfast	Ireland	C	Detroit Red Wings	1946–1954	412	49	
Sammy McManus	Belfast	Ireland	LW	Montreal Maroons	1934–1937	26	1	
Paul Messier	Nottingham	England	C	Colorado Rockies	1978–1979	9	0	
Dunc Munro	Moray	Scotland	D	Montreal Maroons	1924–1932	239	21	
Owen Nolan	Belfast	Northern Ireland	RW	Quebec Nordiques	1990–2010	1,200	65	
Brendan Perlini	Guildford	England	LW	Arizona Coyotes	2016–2022	239	0	
Brian Perry	Aldershot	England	C	Oakland Seals	1968–1971	96	8	
Eric Pettinger	Bradford	England	LW	Boston Bruins	1928–1931	98	4	
Gord Pettinger	Harrogate	England	C	New York Rangers	1932–1940	292	47	
Jack Pratt	Edinburgh	Scotland	C	Boston Bruins	1930–1932	37	4	
Fred Robertson	Carlisle	England	D	Toronto Maple Leafs	1931–1934	34	7	
Jim Ross	Edinburgh	Scotland	D	New York Rangers	1951–1953	62	0	
Alex Smith	Liverpool	England	D	Ottawa Senators	1924–1935	443	19	
Steve Smith	Glasgow	Scotland	D	Edmonton Oilers	1984–2001	804	134	
Daniel Taylor	Plymouth	England	G	Los Angeles Kings	2008–2018	4	0	
Cy Thomas	Dowlais	Wales	LW	Chicago Black Hawks	1947–1948	14	0	
Steve Thomas	Stockport	England	RW	Toronto Maple Leafs	1984–2004	1,235	174	
Ken Thompson	Oakengates	England	LW	Montreal Wanderers	1917–1918	1	0	
Bill Thomson	Troon	Scotland	C	Detroit Red Wings	1938–1944	9	2	
Jack Tomson	Uxbridge	England	D	New York Americans	1939–1941	15	2	
Nathan Walker	Cardiff	Wales	C	Washington Capitals	2017–2026	266	12	
Bob Whitelaw	Motherwell	Scotland	D	Detroit Red Wings	1940–1942	32	8	
Alex Wood	Falkirk	Scotland	G	New York Americans	1936–1937	1	0	
Chris Worthy	Bristol	England	G	Oakland Seals	1968–1971	26	0	

== See also ==
- Elite Ice Hockey League
