= Jack Tomson =

English-born ice hockey player

- Born: 31 January 1918 Uxbridge, England, UK
- Died: 14 December 2001 (aged 83)
- Height: 6 ft 1 in (185 cm)
- Weight: 175 lb (79 kg; 12 st 7 lb)
- Position: Defence
- Shot: Right
- Played for: New York Americans
- Playing career: 1937–1951

John Fraser Tomson (31 January 1918 — 14 December 2001) was a British-born Canadian ice hockey player who played 15 games in the National Hockey League with the New York Americans between 1939 and 1941. The rest of his career, which lasted from 1937 to 1951, was spent in various minor leagues. Born in Uxbridge, England, United Kingdom, he was raised in Regina, Saskatchewan.

== Career statistics ==
=== Regular season and playoffs ===
			Regular season					Playoffs
Season	Team	League	GP	G	A	Pts	PIM	GP	G	A	Pts	PIM
1934–35	Regina Wares	RJRHL	6	3	2	5	0	—	—	—	—	—
1935–36	Regina Christies	RJRHL	3	4	0	4	4	—	—	—	—	—
1935–36	Regina Jr. Aces	SJHL	3	1	1	2	6	4	0	1	1	2
1935–36	Regina Jr. Aces	M-Cup	—	—	—	—	—	2	1	1	2	0
1936–37	Regina Jr. Aces	SJHL	5	6	0	6	0	2	0	0	0	0
1937–38	Regina Aces	SSHL	24	15	8	23	23	3	1	0	1	0
1938–39	Seattle Seahawks	PCHL	7	0	0	0	0	—	—	—	—	—
1938–39	Philadelphia Ramblers	IAHL	45	2	9	11	36	7	0	0	0	6
1938–39	New York Americans	NHL	—	—	—	—	—	2	0	0	0	0
1939–40	New York Americans	NHL	12	1	0	1	0	—	—	—	—	—
1939–40	Kansas City Greyhounds	AHA	11	0	2	2	6	—	—	—	—	—
1939–40	Springfield Indians	IAHL	22	2	3	5	2	2	0	0	0	2
1940–41	New York Americans	NHL	3	0	0	0	0	—	—	—	—	—
1940–41	Seattle Olympics	PCHL	40	14	18	32	52	2	0	0	0	2
1941–42	Regina Rangers	SSHL	27	6	12	18	41	3	0	0	0	2
1942–43	Victoria Navy	VNDHL	18	8	10	18	41	6	6	5	11	11
1943–44	Victoria Navy	PCHL	16	5	4	9	22	—	—	—	—	—
1944–45	Seattle Ironmen	PCHL	2	1	1	2	2	1	0	0	0	2
1945–46	New Westminster Royals	PCHL	53	16	22	38	65	—	—	—	—	—
1946–47	New Westminster Royals	PCHL	57	28	21	49	98	4	0	1	1	0
1947–48	New Westminster Royals	PCHL	54	14	23	37	84	4	1	1	2	0
1948–49	Seattle Ironmen	PCHL	69	12	20	32	31	—	—	—	—	—
1949–50	Kerrisdale Monarchs	OkMHL	24	5	8	13	25	3	0	0	0	2
1950–51	Kerrisdale Monarchs	OkMHL	—	—	—	—	—	—	—	—	—	—
PCHL totals			298	90	109	199	354	11	1	2	3	4
NHL totals			15	1	0	1	0	2	0	0	0	0

== See also ==
- List of National Hockey League players from the United Kingdom
