= Jack Pratt (ice hockey) =

British-born Canadian ice hockey player

- Born: 13 April 1906 Edinburgh, Scotland, UK
- Died: 11 January 1988 (aged 81)
- Height: 6 ft 0 in (183 cm)
- Weight: 190 lb (86 kg; 13 st 8 lb)
- Position: Centre
- Shot: Right
- Played for: Boston Bruins
- Playing career: 1927–1940

John "Jack" Pratt (13 April 1906 – 11 January 1988) was a Canadian professional ice hockey player who played 37 games in the National Hockey League with the Boston Bruins between 1930 and 1932. The rest of his career, which lasted from 1927 to 1940, was spent in minor leagues. Pratt was born in Edinburgh, Scotland, but grew up in Rossland, British Columbia.

== Career statistics ==
=== Regular season and playoffs ===
			Regular season					Playoffs
Season	Team	League	GP	G	A	Pts	PIM	GP	G	A	Pts	PIM
1927–28	Rossland Ramblers	WKHL	—	—	—	—	—	—	—	—	—	—
1928–29	Portland Buckaroos	PCHL	36	5	3	8	98	2	0	0	0	6
1929–30	Portland Buckaroos	PCHL	34	5	3	8	162	4	0	3	3	10
1930–31	Boston Bruins	NHL	32	2	0	2	36	4	0	0	0	0
1930–31	Boston Tigers	Can-Am	5	1	1	2	8	9	1	2	3	30
1931–32	Boston Bruins	NHL	5	0	0	0	6	—	—	—	—	—
1931–32	Boston Cubs	Can-Am	37	12	8	20	137	5	0	1	1	6
1932–33	Philadelphia Arrows	Can-Am	43	16	14	30	75	5	2	0	2	8
1933–34	Kimberley Dynamiters	WKHL	—	—	—	—	—	—	—	—	—	—
1934–35	Kimberley Dynamiters	WKHL	—	—	—	—	—	—	—	—	—	—
1935–36	Portland Buckaroos	PCHL	27	19	15	34	43	—	—	—	—	—
1936–37	Kimberley Dynamiters	WKHL	—	—	—	—	—	—	—	—	—	—
1937–38	Kimberley Dynamiters	WKHL	12	6	7	13	27	—	—	—	—	—
1938–39	Kimberley Dynamiters	WKHL	—	—	—	—	—	—	—	—	—	—
1939–40	Kimberley Dynamiters	WKHL	5	0	1	1	8	—	—	—	—	—
Can-Am totals			85	29	23	52	220	19	3	3	6	44
NHL totals			37	2	0	2	42	4	0	0	0	0

== See also ==
- List of National Hockey League players from the United Kingdom
