= Paul Thompson (ice hockey, born 1906) =

Canadian ice hockey player

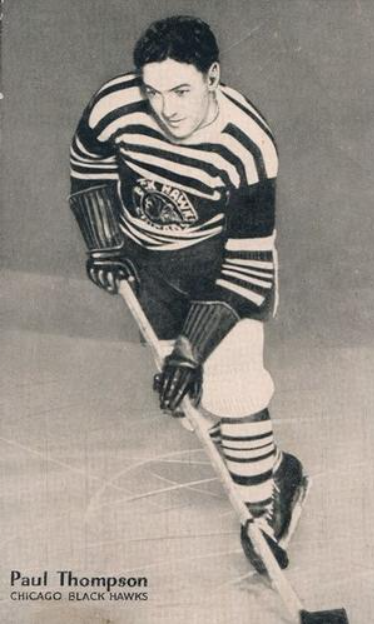
- Thompson in 1935
- Born: November 2, 1906 Calgary, Alberta, Canada
- Died: September 13, 1991 (aged 84) Calgary, Alberta, Canada
- Height: 5 ft 11 in (180 cm)
- Weight: 180 lb (82 kg; 12 st 12 lb)
- Position: Left wing
- Shot: Left
- Played for: New York Rangers; Chicago Black Hawks
- Playing career: 1926–1939

Paul Ivan Thompson (November 2, 1906 – September 13, 1991) was a Canadian ice hockey winger who played thirteen seasons in the National Hockey League (NHL). He was the younger brother of Hockey Hall of Fame goaltender Cecil "Tiny" Thompson.

== Career ==
Thompson started his National Hockey League career with the New York Rangers in 1926. He also played for the Chicago Black Hawks and retired after the 1939 season. He was a member of the season-ending NHL All-Star team twice as a player and twice as a coach. He was a three-time winner of the Stanley Cup, winning it in 1928 with the Rangers, and in 1934 and 1938 with Black Hawks.

Thompson faced his brother Tiny in the 1929 Stanley Cup Final, marking the first time a set of brothers faced each other in a goaltender-forward combination in Stanley Cup Final history. Paul's Rangers were swept by Tiny's Boston Bruins. Tiny said of the matchup: "When I played goal for Boston against Paul (in) the final of 1929, he was just a rookie. It was really no contest."

After retiring from playing, Thompson became a professional coach, notably coaching the Chicago Black Hawks between 1939 and 1945, and the Vancouver Canucks of the Pacific Coast Hockey League (PCHL), between 1945 and 1947.

== Career statistics ==
			Regular season					Playoffs
Season	Team	League	GP	G	A	Pts	PIM	GP	G	A	Pts	PIM
1924–25	Calgary Canadians	CCJHL	—	—	—	—	—	—	—	—	—	—
1924–25	Calgary Canadians	M-Cup	—	—	—	—	—	2	0	0	0	0
1925–26	Calgary Canadians	CCJHL	—	—	—	—	—	—	—	—	—	—
1925–26	Calgary Canadians	M-Cup	—	—	—	—	—	9	12	2	14	10
1926–27	New York Rangers	NHL	43	7	3	10	12	2	0	0	0	0
1927–28	New York Rangers	NHL	42	4	4	8	22	8	0	0	0	30
1928–29	New York Rangers	NHL	44	10	7	17	38	6	0	2	2	6
1929–30	New York Rangers	NHL	44	7	12	19	36	4	0	0	0	2
1930–31	New York Rangers	NHL	44	7	7	14	36	4	3	0	3	2
1931–32	Chicago Black Hawks	NHL	48	8	14	22	34	2	0	0	0	2
1932–33	Chicago Black Hawks	NHL	48	13	20	33	27	—	—	—	—	—
1933–34	Chicago Black Hawks	NHL	48	20	16	36	17	8	4	3	7	6
1934–35	Chicago Black Hawks	NHL	48	16	23	39	20	2	0	0	0	0
1935–36	Chicago Black Hawks	NHL	45	17	23	40	19	2	0	3	3	0
1936–37	Chicago Black Hawks	NHL	47	17	18	35	28	—	—	—	—	—
1937–38	Chicago Black Hawks	NHL	48	22	22	44	14	10	4	3	7	6
1938–39	Chicago Black Hawks	NHL	33	5	10	15	33	—	—	—	—	—
NHL totals			582	153	179	332	336	48	11	11	22	54

== Coaching record ==
Team	Year	Regular season						Postseason
Team	Year	G	W	L	T	Pts	Division rank	Result
CHI	1938–39	27	4	18	5	13	7th in NHL	Did not qualify
CHI	1939–40	48	23	19	6	52	4th in NHL	Lost in quarter-finals (0-2 vs. TOR)
CHI	1940–41	48	16	25	7	39	5th in NHL	Won in quarter-finals (2-1 vs. MTL); Lost in semi-finals (0-2 vs. DET)
CHI	1941–42	48	22	23	3	47	4th in NHL	Lost in quarter-finals (1-2 vs. BOS)
CHI	1942–43	50	17	18	15	49	5th in NHL	Did not qualify
CHI	1943–44	50	22	23	5	49	4th in NHL	Won in semi-final (4-1 vs. DET); Lost in Stanley Cup Final (0-4 vs. MTL)
CHI	1944–45	1	0	1	0	0	5th in NHL	Fired
Total		272	104	127	41	249		7-12 (.368)

Preceded by Bill Stewart	Head coach of the Chicago Black Hawks; 1939–44	Succeeded by Johnny Gottselig
