= Wilf Cude =

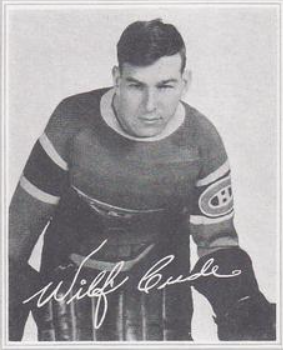
- Cude with the Montreal Canadiens in 1938
- Born: July 4, 1906 Barry, Wales
- Died: May 5, 1968 (aged 61) Montreal, Quebec, Canada
- Height: 5 ft 9 in (175 cm)
- Weight: 146 lb (66 kg; 10 st 6 lb)
- Position: Goaltender
- Caught: Left
- Played for: Philadelphia Quakers; Boston Bruins; Chicago Black Hawks; Detroit Red Wings; Montreal Canadiens
- Playing career: 1930–1941

Wilfred Reginald Cude (July 4, 1906 – May 5, 1968) was a Canadian professional ice hockey player. He played ten seasons as a goaltender in the National Hockey League (NHL) for the Philadelphia Quakers, Boston Bruins, Chicago Black Hawks, Detroit Red Wings, and Montreal Canadiens.

== Career ==
Cude in undated publicity photo

Cude was born in Barry, Wales in 1906, although his birthdate has been commonly listed as being in 1910. In 1913, the family moved to Toronto, Ontario, Canada. After World War I broke out, the family relocated to England where his father Harry was serving with a Canadian contingent. The family returned to Canada in 1919. Harry had war injuries and the family moved to Winnipeg, Manitoba for the drier climate. Wilf began playing ice hockey in Winnipeg and played for the St. Vital Saints and the Winnipeg Wellingtons in Winnipeg. Wilf was a childhood friend of Charlie Gardiner, who would also play in the National Hockey League. Wilf was a two-sport athlete. He was an outside right as a soccer player.

Cude would go on to play in the NHL from 1929–30 to 1940–41. He was signed in February 1930 by the Pittsburgh Pirates and moved with that team to Philadelphia. He was the Philadelphia Quakers' goaltender during its only disastrous 1930–31 season. In 1931–32, with the Quakers having suspended operations, Cude had the distinction of being the NHL's spare goaltender, playing for whatever team needed backup. This was a distinguished spot in the 1930s when no more than ten teams competed in any given year.

In 1933, the Quakers traded Cude to the Montreal Canadiens who already had George Hainsworth as their star goaltender. Before the 1933–34 season, Hainsworth was traded to the Toronto Maple Leafs for similarly distinguished Lorne Chabot. Cude played one game for the Canadiens before he was loaned to the Detroit Red Wings, where he posted an outstanding campaign. He wound up leading the Red Wings to their first Stanley Cup Finals appearance, though they lost to Charlie Gardiner and the Chicago Black Hawks, falling three games to one in the best-of-five series. Cude also surrendered the first overtime goal clinching a Stanley Cup when he was scored on by Mush March at the 10:05 mark of the second overtime in game four. He posted a league-leading 1.52 goals against average for the year.

The Canadiens were so impressed by Cude's work with the Red Wings that they traded Chabot and made Cude their number one goaltender through the 1937–38 season. He split duties with Claude Bourque in 1938–39 and ceded the starter job to Bourque in 1939–40, and to Bert Gardiner in 1940–41.

The Canadiens did not win a Stanley Cup during Cude's tenure as their starting goaltender. These were among the team's worst years, on the ice as well as in the state of their finances. The worst of these years, 1935–36, a year during which the Montreal Maroons were defending Stanley Cup champions, the Canadiens won 11, lost 26 and tied 11, though Cude posted six shutouts in those 11 victories.

The moment when Cude decided to retire from hockey is recorded in Stan Fischler's book The Zany World of Hockey. Before a game, Cude was eating his afternoon steak with his wife. He had a tendency to cover the steak in ketchup...when she made a remark about his playing, he threw the steak at her, missed, and it stuck to the wall. "Between the time the steak hit the wall and then hit the floor, I decided I had had enough of goaltending." Like many players, Cude was superstitious. He and his wife would drive to the rink and park the car. If Cude's team won, they would park in the same spot before the next game, until the team lost, when they would then park in a different spot.

After his playing days were over, Cude became a coach in junior hockey. He was president of the St. Laurent Intermediate League. He moved to Rouyn-Noranda, Quebec and worked for British Oil and coached junior hockey. In 1948, he became a scout for the Red Wings, and returned to coaching in 1961 as coach of the Rouyn-Noranda Alouettes. Cude died of cancer in 1968.

== Awards and achievements ==
- NHL Second All-Star Team (1936 & 1937)
- "Honoured Member" of the Manitoba Hockey Hall of Fame

== Career statistics ==
=== Regular season and playoffs ===
			Regular season								Playoffs
Season	Team	League	GP	W	L	T	Min	GA	SO	GAA	GP	W	L	T	Min	GA	SO	GAA
1927–28	St. Vital AC	MAHA	—	—	—	—	—	—	—	—	—	—	—	—	—	—	—	—
1928–29	Winnipeg Wellingtons	WSrHL	—	—	—	—	—	—	—	—	—	—	—	—	—	—	—	—
1929–30	Melville Millionaires	S-SSHL	20	13	6	1	1290	40	3	1.86	2	1	1	0	120	3	1	1.50
1930–31	Philadelphia Quakers	NHL	30	2	25	3	1850	130	1	4.22	—	—	—	—	—	—	—	—
1931–32	Boston Bruins	NHL	2	1	1	0	120	6	1	3.00	—	—	—	—	—	—	—	—
1931–32	Chicago Black Hawks	NHL	1	0	0	0	41	9	0	13.17	—	—	—	—	—	—	—	—
1931–32	Syracuse Stars	IHL	1	0	0	1	70	1	0	0.86	—	—	—	—	—	—	—	—
1931–32	Boston Cubs	Can-Am	15	7	7	1	900	46	1	3.00	—	—	—	—	—	—	—	—
1932–33	Philadelphia Arrows	Can-Am	32	21	9	2	1950	64	4	1.97	5	2	3	0	300	15	1	3.00
1933–34	Montreal Canadiens	NHL	1	1	0	0	60	0	1	0.00	—	—	—	—	—	—	—	—
1933–34	Syracuse Stars	IHL	19	10	7	2	1140	39	3	2.05	—	—	—	—	—	—	—	—
1933–34	Detroit Red Wings	NHL	29	15	6	8	1860	47	4	1.52	9	4	5	0	593	21	1	2.12
1934–35	Montreal Canadiens	NHL	48	19	23	6	2960	145	1	2.94	2	0	1	1	120	6	0	3.00
1935–36	Montreal Canadiens	NHL	47	11	26	10	2940	122	6	2.49	—	—	—	—	—	—	—	—
1936–37	Montreal Canadiens	NHL	44	22	17	5	2730	99	5	2.18	5	2	3	—	352	13	0	2.22
1937–38	Montreal Canadiens	NHL	47	18	17	12	2990	126	3	2.53	3	1	2	—	192	11	0	3.44
1938–39	Montreal Canadiens	NHL	23	8	11	4	1440	77	2	3.21	—	—	—	—	—	—	—	—
1939–40	Montreal Canadiens	NHL	7	1	5	1	415	24	0	3.47	—	—	—	—	—	—	—	—
1939–40	New Haven Eagles	IAHL	44	23	18	1	2690	146	3	3.26	3	1	2	—	180	11	0	3.67
1940–41	Montreal Canadiens	NHL	3	2	1	0	180	13	0	4.33	—	—	—	—	—	—	—	—
NHL totals			282	100	132	49	17,586	798	24	2.72	19	7	11	1	1257	51	1	2.43

== See also ==
- List of National Hockey League players from the United Kingdom
