= 1926 Memorial Cup =

Canadian junior ice hockey championship

The Memorial Cup trophy

The 1926 Memorial Cup final was the eighth junior ice hockey championship of the Canadian Amateur Hockey Association. The George Richardson Memorial Trophy champions Queen's University of Eastern Canada competed against the Abbott Cup champions Calgary Canadians of the Calgary City Junior Hockey League in Western Canada. The Queen's University team was a junior squad which played exhibition games against teams in the Ontario Hockey Association senior division, and teams in the Lake Ontario Veteran's Hockey League. In a best-of-three series, held at Shea's Amphitheatre in Winnipeg, Manitoba, Calgary won their first Memorial Cup, defeating Queen's University two games to one.

== Background ==
Calgary hade defeated the Winnipeg Tammany Tigers for the Western Canadian championship, while Queens had beaten a team from Fort William for the Eastern Canadian title.

== Scores ==
The first game was held on March 23, 1926, with Queen's winning 4-2. Calgary won game two, played on March 25, 3-2, and then won game three on March 26 with a 3-2 score, also securing the Memorial Cup.

== Winning roster ==
Chuck Dunn, Irving Frew, Ronnie Martin, Joe McGoldrich, Don McFadyen, George McTeer, Tony Savage, Bert Taylor, Paul Thompson, Sam Timmins. Coach: Eddie Poulin
