= Gordon Savage (ice hockey) =

Canadian ice hockey player

- Born: July 18, 1906; Calgary, Alberta, Canada
- Died: February 28, 1974 (aged 67)
- Height: 5 ft 11 in (180 cm)
- Weight: 150 lb (68 kg; 10 st 10 lb)
- Position: Defence
- Shot: Left
- Played for: Boston Bruins; Montreal Canadiens
- Playing career: 1926–1940

Gordon Donald "Tony" Savage (July 18, 1906 — February 28, 1974) was professional ice hockey player who played 49 games in the National Hockey League with the Boston Bruins and Montreal Canadiens during the 1934–35 season. The rest of his career, which lasted from 1926 to 1940, was spent in various minor leagues. He was born in Calgary, Alberta.

== Career statistics ==
=== Regular season and playoffs ===
| | | | Regular season | | | | | Playoffs |
| Season | Team | League | GP | G | A | Pts | PIM | GP | G | A | Pts | PIM |
|---|---|---|---|---|---|---|---|---|---|---|---|---|
| 1925–26 | Calgary Canadians | CCJHL | — | — | — | — | — | — | — | — | — | — |
| 1925–26 | Calgary Canadians | M-Cup | — | — | — | — | — | 9 | 3 | 3 | 6 | 18 |
| 1926–27 | Calgary Tigers | PrHL | 29 | 1 | 2 | 3 | 27 | 2 | 0 | 0 | 0 | 0 |
| 1927–28 | Kitchener Millionaires | Can-Pro | 32 | 1 | 4 | 5 | 59 | — | — | — | — | — |
| 1928–29 | Kitchener Flying Dutchmen | Can-Pro | 37 | 8 | 1 | 9 | 33 | 3 | 0 | 0 | 0 | 4 |
| 1929–30 | Seattle Eskimos | PCHL | 35 | 7 | 1 | 8 | 28 | — | — | — | — | — |
| 1930–31 | Seattle Eskimos | PCHL | 33 | 11 | 5 | 16 | 83 | 4 | 2 | 0 | 2 | 10 |
| 1931–32 | Syracuse Stars | IHL | 48 | 8 | 13 | 21 | 58 | — | — | — | — | — |
| 1932–33 | Syracuse Stars | IHL | 35 | 9 | 6 | 15 | 75 | 6 | 1 | 2 | 3 | 8 |
| 1933–34 | Calgary Tigers | NWHL | 29 | 9 | 12 | 21 | 48 | 5 | 3 | 1 | 4 | 4 |
| 1934–35 | Boston Bruins | NHL | 8 | 0 | 0 | 0 | 2 | — | — | — | — | — |
| 1934–35 | Montreal Canadiens | NHL | 41 | 1 | 5 | 6 | 14 | 2 | 0 | 0 | 0 | 0 |
| 1935–36 | Calgary Tigers | NWHL | 34 | 22 | 17 | 39 | 45 | — | — | — | — | — |
| 1937–38 | Olds Elks | ASHL | 25 | 13 | 9 | 22 | 25 | 3 | 0 | 1 | 1 | 6 |
| 1938–39 | Saskatoon Quakers | SSHL | 7 | 1 | 2 | 3 | 2 | — | — | — | — | — |
| 1939–40 | Lethbridge Maple Leafs | ASHL | 5 | 0 | 2 | 2 | 2 | — | — | — | — | — |
| NHL totals | | | 49 | 1 | 5 | 6 | 16 | 2 | 0 | 0 | 0 | 0 |
