= Foley Martin =

Canadian ice hockey player

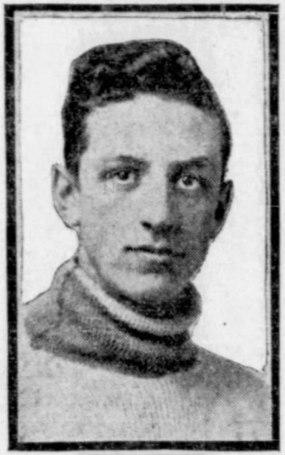
- Martin with the Calgary Columbus Club
- Born: January 4, 1901 Banff, Alberta, Canada
- Died: December 9, 1923 (aged 22) Seattle, Washington, United States
- Height: 5 ft 8 in (173 cm)
- Weight: 150 lb (68 kg; 10 st 10 lb)
- Position: Left wing
- Shot: Left
- Played for: Calgary Tigers; Calgary Canadians; Calgary Columbus Club
- Playing career: 1918–1923

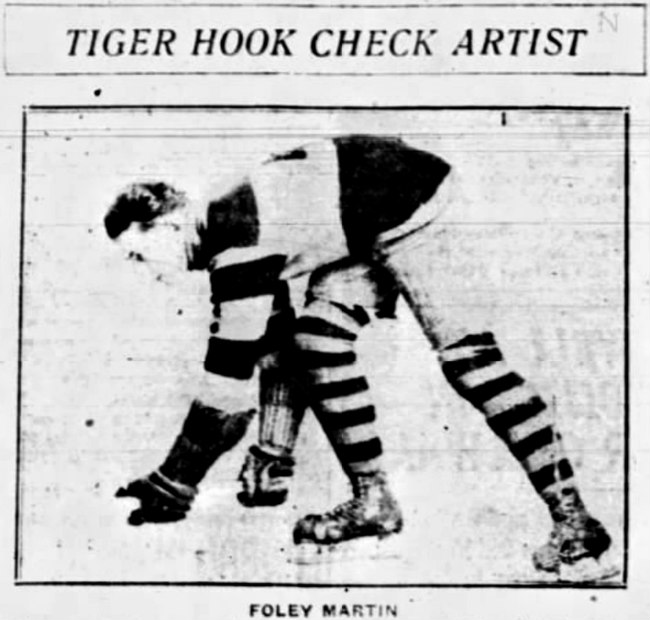
Martin displaying the hook check while with the Calgary Tigers.

Alexander Foley Martin (January 4, 1901 – December 9, 1923) was a Canadian professional ice hockey player. He played for the Calgary Tigers of the Western Canada Hockey League in the early 1920s. In the beginning of the 1923–24 season, Martin died of blood poisoning during the Tigers' season opening road trip to the Pacific Coast.

He was an older brother of Ron Martin who played two seasons with the New York Americans between 1932 and 1934.

== Playing style ==
While not a prominent scorer, Martin's strong sides to his game included his stick-handling and defensive hook check technique.
