= Charlie Gardiner (ice hockey) =

Canadian ice hockey player (1904–1934)

- Hockey Hall of Fame, 1945
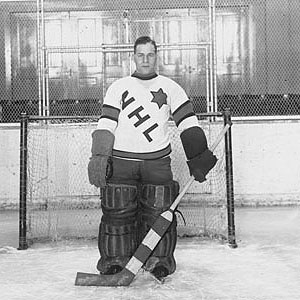
- Gardiner at the Ace Bailey Benefit Game in 1934
- Born: December 31, 1904 Edinburgh, Scotland
- Died: June 13, 1934 (aged 29) Winnipeg, Manitoba, Canada
- Height: 6 ft 0 in (183 cm)
- Weight: 176 lb (80 kg; 12 st 8 lb)
- Position: Goaltender
- Caught: Right
- Played for: Chicago Black Hawks
- Playing career: 1927–1934

Charles Robert Gardiner (December 31, 1904 – June 13, 1934) was a Canadian professional ice hockey player who was a goaltender for the Chicago Black Hawks in the National Hockey League. Born in Edinburgh, Scotland, Gardiner moved with his family to Canada as a child. Playing all of his junior hockey in or around Winnipeg, Manitoba, Gardiner joined the Black Hawks in 1927. He played seven seasons with Chicago, winning two Vezina Trophies for allowing the fewest goals, was named to the First All-Star Team three times and Second All-Star Team once in recognition as one of the best goalies in the league. In 1934, Gardiner became the only NHL goaltender to captain his team to a Stanley Cup win. A few months after winning the Cup, Gardiner died from a brain hemorrhage brought on by a tonsillar infection. When the Hockey Hall of Fame was established in 1945, Gardiner was named one of the inaugural inductees.

== Personal life ==
Gardiner was born in Edinburgh, Scotland, to John and Janet Gardiner. The fourth of five children, there were also Gardiner's two older brothers, John and Alexander, an older sister, Edith, and a younger sister, Christina. The family emigrated to Winnipeg, Manitoba, in 1911, when Gardiner was seven. Initially they lived in a house on William Avenue before moving to Alexander Street; both streets were south of the railways, and were full of Scottish-Irish working-class families. John took a job as a rail car repairer, and Gardiner took an early interest in the trains, often waiting up late at night to watch them arrive in the city. He was enrolled at the Albert School, and befriended Wilf Cude, who had immigrated from Wales who would later play in the National Hockey League (NHL) as a goaltender.

When the First World War began in 1914, both of Gardiner's brothers enlisted and were sent overseas. Gardiner's father John also enlisted, but he died May 30, 1916, before he was sent overseas. Both his brothers returned home after the war ended; while Alex was unharmed, John had been involved in a poison gas attack, and was seriously ill. To help provide for the family Gardiner began working for the J.H. Ashdown Hardware Company at the age of twelve. In December 1928 John began to develop an illness as a result of his poison gas attack in the war, and died December 13. Edith had planned to get married on December 31, but wanted to delay the marriage because of John's death, though her family convinced her to continue with the original plan. Gardiner married Myrtle Brooks August 6, 1927, at Grace United Church in Winnipeg. Their first son, Robert Roy, was born May 20, 1929. They also had a girl on May 7, 1931, but she died the same day.

While working at the hardware store, Gardiner first played organised sports as a member of the store's baseball team. Gardiner quickly started playing ice hockey with the same passion as the children who were born in Canada. As he didn't learn to skate until he was eight years old, he couldn't skate very fast and was forced to play as the goaltender. He had tried to play as a forward and defenceman but was too slow for either position. Playing on Winnipeg's frozen ponds, Gardiner employed an acrobatic style, instead of the nearly-universal stand-up style played in that era, to avoid having his hands and feet frostbitten. He joined the Victorias, a team in the Winnipeg City League, at the age of 13. He recorded a shutout in his first game, but the team was shut out in their following game, so Gardiner was cut. By the age of 14, Gardiner made the intermediate team of the Selkirk Fishermen.

Aside from hockey, Gardiner excelled in Canadian football and had joined the Winnipeg Tammany Tigers junior club in 1920. As a defender, Gardiner quickly gained attention for his skill and helped the Tigers reach the Western Canadian junior rugby championship in Regina, Saskatchewan, though they lost the championship game. The following year he changed positions and played as a right outer wing; the Tigers went through the season undefeated and again played in the Western Canadian championship game, which was held in Regina like the previous year; the team again lost. While with the Tammany Tigers Gardiner played in the 13th Grey Cup, the Canadian football championship, losing against the Ottawa Senators 24–1.

Outside of hockey, Gardiner enjoyed several different hobbies. During one off-season from the Black Hawks, Gardiner began taking flying lessons from his former teammate Konrad Johannesson. He quickly learned how to fly solo and would buy shares in the Winnipeg Flying Club, which Johannesson had founded. He also enjoyed shooting rifles; in the summer of 1931 he was recognised for this when he was elected Field Secretary of the Winnipeg Gun Club. The following summer Gardiner earned a certificate in business administration and sales from the International Correspondence Schools. He then became a partner in a sporting goods business and travelled across Western Canada in the summer to sell products to sports teams. Gardiner attended church services at Grace United Church in Winnipeg, which had hosted his wedding. He was also a Freemason, and joined the St. John's Lodge in Winnipeg on April 21, 1926. During the summer of 1933, he was selected as a Shriner at the Lodge; at the age of 29 he was the youngest Shriner in the city.

== Pre-NHL career ==
Gardiner played junior ice hockey with the Winnipeg Tigers of the Manitoba Junior Hockey League (MJHL) for three seasons, from 1921 to 1924. He joined the Selkirk Fishermen senior team for the 1924–25 season. The Fishermen played in the highest amateur league in Manitoba and were finalists for the championship the year before. Gardiner appeared in 18 games for Selkirk, posting two shutouts and a 1.83 goals against average. They again reached the finals but lost to the Port Arthur Bearcats. The loss made Gardiner feel dejected and ashamed, though people assured him he had played well and had several offers for different teams. He decided to join the professional Winnipeg Maroons of the Central Hockey League (CHL). As he would be a professional, Gardiner was forced to give up his baseball career, which he was reluctant to do; he finished with a career batting average of .300. Playing two seasons in Winnipeg, Gardiner appeared in 74 games, posting 12 shutouts, and 2.14 and 2.16 goals-against average in the two seasons, respectively.

== Chicago Black Hawks ==
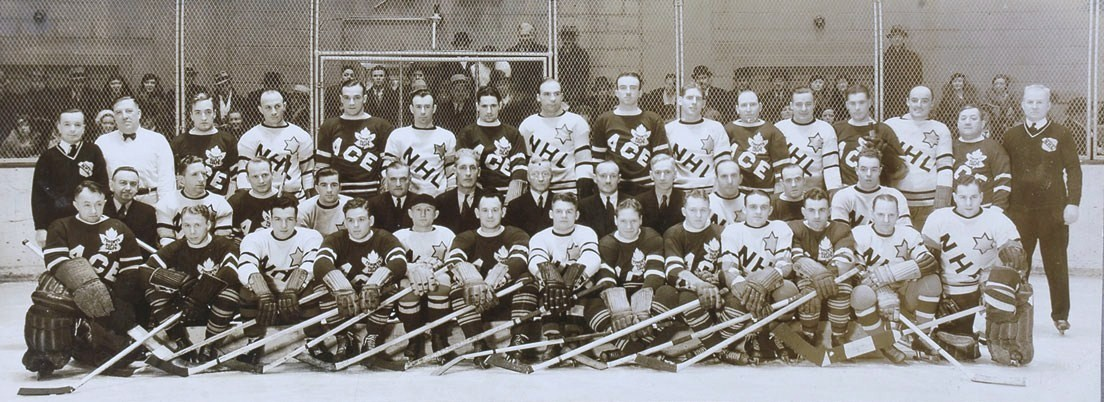
Gardiner (first row, far right) at the Ace Bailey Benefit All-Star Game

Gardiner joined the Chicago Black Hawks in the 1927–28 season. In his first season with the Black Hawks, Gardiner played in 40 out of 44 of Chicago's games. Recording a 2.83 goals average, Gardiner won or tied only eight games, with three of those games being shutouts. The following season, Gardiner appeared in all 44 games for Chicago. Known as the NHL's "goalless wonders", Chicago scored only 33 goals the entire season, finishing with a 7–29–8 record. Gardiner had five shutouts and a 1.85 goals against average that season. During a game against the New York Rangers on February 3, 1929 WJ Holmes, manager of the Maroons came to Chicago to watch Gardiner play. The Rangers won the game 3–2 though Gardiner played well. Even so, Frederic McLaughlin, owner of the Hawks, offered to sell him back to Winnipeg for $3500. Only after Barney Stanley and Hugh Lehman talked to McLaughlin did he back down on the deal. After being booed by the Chicago fans, Gardiner nearly retired, before being talked out of it by Duke Keats.

After the NHL changed its rules to allow forward passing in the offensive zone in the 1929–30 season, goal scoring increased league-wide. While Chicago increased its goals scored to 117, Gardiner's goals against average rose by only 0.57, to 2.42. Gardiner's total number of shutouts fell by two, from five to three. Chicago improved its regular season record to 21–18–15, placing second in the American Division, and making the playoffs. In the playoffs, the Black Hawks lost to the Montreal Canadiens 3–2 in a two-game, total-goal series, losing and tying one game. In the 1930–31 season, Chicago placed, once more, second in the American Division, with a 24–17–3 record. Gardiner recorded one of his best statistical years, recording a league-leading 12 shutouts to go with a 1.73 goals against average. Late in December 1930 the New York Americans offered $10,000 to the Hawks in exchange for Gardiner, double his salary; McLaughlin refused the offer. He was also named, for the first time, to the First All-Star Team. In the playoffs, Chicago advanced to the Stanley Cup Finals, losing once more to the Montreal Canadiens, three games to two. Posting a 5–3–2 record in the playoffs, Gardiner had another two shutouts and a 1.32 goals against average.

In the 1931–32 season, Chicago finished with an 18–19–11 regular season record. Gardiner recorded four shutouts and a 1.85 goals against average. Gardiner was named to the First All-Star Team, and won the Vezina Trophy for the first time, becoming the first goalie who caught right-handed to do so. Placing second in the American Division for the third season in a row, the Black Hawks lost a two-game, total-goal series 6–2 to the Toronto Maple Leafs. Gardiner won one game and lost one during the playoffs, with one shutout and a 3.00 goals against average. In the 1932–33 season, Chicago missed the playoffs, with a 16-20-12 record, placing fourth in the American Division. Gardiner recorded five shutouts, with a 2.01 goals against average. He was named to the Second All-Star Team for the only time in his career.

Before the beginning of the 1933–34 season, Gardiner's teammates unanimously elected him captain. During the regular season, Chicago finished with a 20–17–11 record. Gardiner had 10 shutouts, and a 1.63 goals against average. He was named for the third time to the First All-Star Team, and won the Vezina Trophy for the second time. On February 14, 1934, he was a participant in the Ace Bailey Benefit Game, playing goaltender for the All-Stars, who played against the Maple Leafs. In the playoffs, Gardiner had a 6–1–1 record, with two shutouts and a 1.33 goals against average, as Chicago won the Stanley Cup for the first time in franchise history. During the Stanley Cup parade, Chicago defenseman Roger Jenkins carted Gardiner in a wheelbarrow around Chicago's business district after a pre-playoff bet.

== Illness and death ==
During the 1932–33 season Gardiner began to develop a tonsil infection that drained his strength. While he initially kept the infection private, Gardiner made his condition public on December 23, 1932. Even though he was ill, Gardiner played the next night in Toronto. Though his fifty-five saves were the deciding factor in the Black Hawks win and his performance was so good that both league President Frank Calder and Maple Leafs star forward Charlie Conacher praised him, he was so sick he would collapse on the dressing room floor in between periods with a fever of over 100 degrees Fahrenheit; after the game Gardiner was rushed to a local hospital. This was the first notable symptom of Gardiner's health issues.

In January 1934 the Black Hawks were on a train back to Chicago when Gardiner felt an intense pain in his throat that spread to the rest of his body, notably his kidneys. When questioned by Tommy Gorman about his issue, Gardiner lied to Gorman and insisted it was only a minor headache. However, when Gardiner woke up on the train in the morning, he had trouble seeing, as black spots obscured his vision. This was Gardiner's first uremic convulsion.

Gardiner's health continued to be an issue throughout the 1934 NHL playoffs. On March 29, 1934 in a playoff game against the Montreal Maroons Gardiner had a shutout as the Black Hawks won 3–0; though he was named first star as the best player of the game, Gardiner was in extreme pain during the entire game with a fever of 102 Fahrenheit and was attended to by a doctor in the dressing room during intermissions.

Playing with a tonsillar infection for most of the season, Gardiner was often slumped over his crossbar during breaks in games, nearly blacking out. After leaving for a singing lesson on June 10, 1934, Gardiner, a baritone, collapsed. He went into a coma, from which he never woke. Gardiner died on June 13, 1934, in Winnipeg, from a brain hemorrhage brought on by the infection.

In a Montreal Gazette story about Gardiner's untimely death that ran on June 14, 1934, Detroit general-manager Jack Adams declared Gardiner to be "a grand chap; one could not help but like him. He was undoubtedly the finest netminder in the league. What is more, he always played the game as a gentleman."

== Legacy ==
Gardiner was the first goaltender who caught with his right hand to win the Vezina Trophy. He is the only NHL goaltender to captain his team to a Stanley Cup victory. In 1945, Gardiner became a charter member of the Hockey Hall of Fame. In 1998, he was ranked number 76 on The Hockey News' list of the 100 Greatest Hockey Players. Gardiner is a member of Canada's Sports Hall of Fame, Manitoba Sports Hall of Fame and Museum, and the Manitoba Hockey Hall of Fame. Overall, he played 316 NHL games, winning 122, with a goals against average of 2.02 goals, and 42 shutouts. In the playoffs, Gardiner appeared in 21 games, with a 1.43 goals against average and five shutouts. When the British Elite Ice Hockey League introduced a conference system in the 2012–13 season, one of its two conferences was named in honour of Gardiner. An arena in Winnipeg located near his childhood home, was renamed the Charlie Gardiner Arena in 2018.

== Career statistics ==
=== Regular season and playoffs ===
			Regular season								Playoffs
Season	Team	League	GP	W	L	T	Min	GA	SO	GAA	GP	W	L	T	Min	GA	SO	GAA
1921–22	Winnipeg Tigers	MJHL	1	0	1	0	60	6	0	6.00	—	—	—	—	—	—	—	—
1922–23	Winnipeg Tigers	MJHL	6	—	—	—	370	19	0	3.08	—	—	—	—	—	—	—	—
1923–24	Winnipeg Tigers	MJHL	—	—	—	—	—	—	—	—	1	1	0	0	60	0	1	0.00
1924–25	Selkirk Fishermen	MHL	18	—	—	—	1080	33	2	1,83	2	0	2	0	120	6	0	3.00
1925–26	Winnipeg Maroons	CHL	38	—	—	—	2280	82	6	2.16	5	—	—	—	300	10	1	2.00
1926–27	Winnipeg Maroons	AHA	36	17	14	5	2203	77	6	2.14	3	0	3	0	180	8	0	2.67
1927–28	Chicago Black Hawks	NHL	40	6	32	2	2420	114	3	2.83	—	—	—	—	—	—	—	—
1928–29	Chicago Black Hawks	NHL	44	7	29	8	2758	85	5	1.85	—	—	—	—	—	—	—	—
1929–30	Chicago Black Hawks	NHL	44	21	18	5	2750	111	3	2.42	2	0	1	1	172	3	0	1.05
1930–31	Chicago Black Hawks	NHL	44	24	17	3	2710	78	12	1.73	9	5	3	1	638	14	2	1.32
1931–32	Chicago Black Hawks	NHL	48	18	19	11	2989	92	4	1.85	2	1	1	0	120	6	1	3.00
1932–33	Chicago Black Hawks	NHL	48	16	20	12	3010	101	5	2.01	—	—	—	—	—	—	—	—
1933–34	Chicago Black Hawks	NHL	48	20	17	11	3050	83	10	1.63	8	6	1	1	542	12	2	1.33
NHL totals			316	112	152	52	19687	664	42	2.02	21	12	6	3	1472	35	5	1.43

- Source: Hockey Hall of Fame

== Awards ==
=== NHL ===
Award	Year(s)
Vezina Trophy	1932, 1934
First All-Star team Goaltender	1931, 1932, 1934
Second All-Star team Goaltender	1933
Stanley Cup	1934

== See also ==
- List of ice hockey players who died during their playing career
- List of National Hockey League players born in the United Kingdom

== Notes ==
Sporting positions
Preceded by Helge Bostrom	Chicago Black Hawks captain 1933–34	Succeeded by Johnny Gottselig
Awards and achievements
Preceded by Roy Worters	Winner of the Vezina Trophy; 1932	Succeeded by Tiny Thompson
Preceded by Tiny Thompson	Winner of the Vezina Trophy; 1934	Succeeded by Lorne Chabot
