= 1933–34 NHL season =

Professional ice hockey league season

- League: National Hockey League
- Sport: Ice hockey
- Duration: November 9, 1933 – April 10, 1934
- Games: 48
- Teams: 9

Regular season
- Season champions: Toronto Maple Leafs
- Season MVP: Aurel Joliat (Canadiens)
- Top scorer: Charlie Conacher (Maple Leafs)
- Canadian Division champions: Toronto Maple Leafs
- American Division champions: Detroit Red Wings

Stanley Cup
- Champions: Chicago Black Hawks
- Runners-up: Detroit Red Wings

NHL seasons
- ← 1932–33 1934–35 →

The 1933–34 NHL season was the 17th season of the National Hockey League (NHL). Nine teams each played 48 games. The Chicago Black Hawks were the Stanley Cup winners as they beat the Detroit Red Wings three games to one.

== League business ==
The New York Americans introduced new sweaters. The team's home uniform uses the word 'Americans' across the front with white stars over a blue area around the shoulders with red and white stripes below the wording. The road uniform is white with a shield logo. There are sleeves and shoulders are blue with a horizontal red stripe at the bottom of the sweater. The team is the second NHL team to have two sets of uniforms, after the Toronto Maple Leafs.

== Regular season ==
The Ottawa Senators, having enough problems, now had to deal with holdout Cooney Weiland. He was sold to Detroit, strengthening the Red Wings. The Senators continued to lose, but won a few games when they signed an amateur named Max Kaminsky to centre the Roche brothers Desse and Earl. A defenceman, Ralph "Scotty" Bowman, gave Ottawa fans a little to cheer about. But the handwriting was on the wall, and in the last NHL game to be played in Ottawa until the NHL returned to that city in 1992, the Senators let the New York Americans use goaltender Alex Connell when Roy Worters was hurt. He helped the Americans beat his club.

A major trade was a swap of goaltenders as Lorne Chabot was traded to the Montreal Canadiens for George Hainsworth. The Canadiens also loaned Wilf Cude to Detroit and he led the Red Wings to first place. Chabot did not do badly either, leading the Canadian Division in goaltending, helping the goal-strapped Canadiens to second place. Aurel Joliat of the Canadiens won the Hart Trophy.

=== Final standings ===
American Division
	GP	W	L	T	GF	GA	PTS
**Detroit Red Wings**	48	24	14	10	113	98	58
**Chicago Black Hawks**	48	20	17	11	88	83	51
**New York Rangers**	48	21	19	8	120	113	50
Boston Bruins	48	18	25	5	111	130	41

Canadian Division
	GP	W	L	T	GF	GA	PTS
**Toronto Maple Leafs**	48	26	13	9	174	119	61
**Montreal Canadiens**	48	22	20	6	99	101	50
**Montreal Maroons**	48	19	18	11	117	122	49
New York Americans	48	15	23	10	104	132	40
Ottawa Senators	48	13	29	6	115	143	32

Note: W = Wins, L = Losses, T = Ties, GF = Goals For, GA = Goals Against, Pts = Points
Teams that qualified for the playoffs are highlighted in bold.

== NHL All-Star Game ==
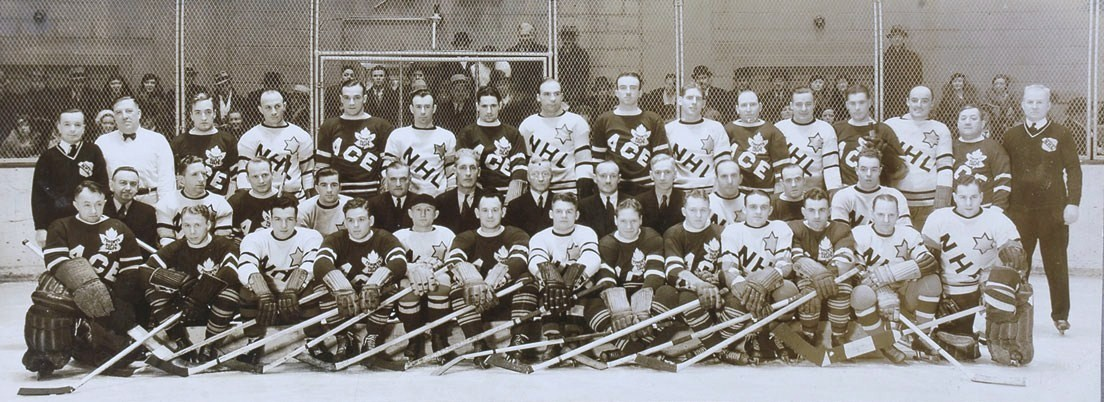
Participants of Ace Bailey Benefit game

On February 14, 1934, the first NHL All-Star Game, albeit an unofficial one, was held to benefit Toronto Maple Leafs forward Ace Bailey, who suffered a career-ending injury. On December 12, 1933, near the end of the second period of a game between the Leafs and the Boston Bruins in the Boston Garden, Bailey was hit from behind by Bruins defenceman Eddie Shore, in retaliation for a check that Toronto defenceman King Clancy had delivered to Shore. Bailey was not the intended target of the check; Shore wanted to hit Clancy instead. Bailey was badly hurt, unconscious and bleeding. The Leafs' Red Horner took offence to the hit, and subsequently knocked out Shore with a punch. Shore was forgiven after the game when both players regained consciousness, with Bailey saying that it was "all part of the game." However, Bailey passed out and lapsed into convulsions. Bailey was not expected to live after a single night in the hospital after suffering from severe hemorrhaging. It was made well known that Shore would have been charged with manslaughter were Bailey to die. He gradually recovered, but his hockey career was over. For his actions, Shore received a 16-game suspension, a third of the 48-game schedule of the time, while Horner was suspended for the remainder of the 1932–33 season.

The game itself was proposed by Walter Gilhooley, the sports editor of the Journal in Montreal. This proposal became a reality on January 24, 1934, in a meeting of the NHL's Board of Governors in 1934. The game was held at Maple Leaf Gardens in Toronto, during which Bailey's #6 uniform was retired by the Leafs. It was the first number to be retired in the NHL. The game saw the Leafs battle against an All-Star team made of players from the other eight teams, which the Leafs won 7–3. One of the more memorable moments before the game was when Bailey presented Shore with his All-Star jersey, showing to the public that Bailey had clearly forgiven him for his actions. Bailey also presented a trophy to NHL President Frank Calder before a game in the hope that the trophy would go to the winner of an annual All-Star Game for the benefit of injured players.

== Playoffs ==
=== Playoff bracket ===
The top three teams in each division qualified for the playoffs. The two division winners met in a best-of-five Stanley Cup semifinal series. The divisional second-place teams and third-place teams played off in a two-game total-goals series to determine the participants for the other two-game total-goals semifinal series. The semifinal winners then played in a best-of-five Stanley Cup Finals.

First round
C2	Mtl Canadiens	3G
A2	Chicago	4G
C3	Mtl Maroons	2G
A3	NY Rangers	1G

Semifinals
C1	Toronto	2
A1	Detroit	3
A2	Chicago	6G
C3	Mtl Maroons	2G

Final
A1	Detroit	1
A2	Chicago	3

=== Quarterfinals ===
==== (A2) Chicago Black Hawks vs. (C2) Montreal Canadiens ====
March 22	Chicago Black Hawks	3–2	Montreal Canadiens	Montreal Forum	Recap
Johnny Gottselig (1) – sh – 03:04		First period	13:40 – sh – Howie Morenz (1); 17:15 – Wildor Larochelle (1)
Lionel Conacher (1) – 10:15		Second period	No scoring
Johnny Gottselig (2) – 04:34		Third period	No scoring
Charlie Gardiner		Goalie stats	Lorne Chabot

March 25	Montreal Canadiens	1–1	OT	Chicago Black Hawks	Chicago Stadium	Recap
Johnny Gagnon (1) – 15:07		First period		No scoring
No scoring		Second period		No scoring
No scoring		Third period		No scoring
No scoring		First overtime period		11:05 – Mush March (1)
Lorne Chabot		Goalie stats		Charlie Gardiner

Chicago won series on total goals 4–3

==== (A3) New York Rangers vs. (C3) Montreal Maroons ====
March 20	New York Rangers	0–0	Montreal Maroons	Montreal Forum	Recap
No scoring		First period	No scoring
No scoring		Second period	No scoring
No scoring		Third period	No scoring
Andy Aitkenhead		Goalie stats	Dave Kerr

March 25	Montreal Maroons	2–1	New York Rangers	Madison Square Garden III	Recap
No scoring		First period	No scoring
Earl Robinson (1) – 16:36		Second period	04:25 – Vic Ripley (1)
Earl Robinson (2) – 12:09		Third period	No scoring
Dave Kerr		Goalie stats	Andy Aitkenhead

Montreal won series on total goals 2–1

=== Semifinals ===
==== (C1) Toronto Maple Leafs vs. (A1) Detroit Red Wings ====
March 22	Detroit Red Wings	2–1	OT	Toronto Maple Leafs	Maple Leaf Gardens	Recap
No scoring		First period		08:33 – pp – Charlie Conacher (1)
No scoring		Second period		No scoring
Ebbie Goodfellow (1) – 15:40		Third period		No scoring
Herbie Lewis (1) – pp – 01:33		First overtime period		No scoring
Wilf Cude		Goalie stats		George Hainsworth

March 24	Detroit Red Wings	6–3	Toronto Maple Leafs	Maple Leaf Gardens	Recap
Ebbie Goodfellow (2) – pp – 03:49		First period	No scoring
Herbie Lewis (2) – 08:19; Ebbie Goodfellow (3) – 13:30		Second period	No scoring
Ted Graham (1) – 12:49; Larry Aurie (1) – 13:01; Herbie Lewis (3) – pp – 18:08		Third period	11:12 – Hec Kilrea (1); 12:16 – Charlie Conacher (2); 17:31 – pp – Red Horner (1)
Wilf Cude		Goalie stats	George Hainsworth

March 26	Toronto Maple Leafs	3–1	Detroit Red Wings	Olympia Stadium	Recap
Ken Doraty (1) – pp – 18:46		First period	No scoring
Ken Doraty (2) – pp – 18:54		Second period	14:59 – pp – Herbie Lewis (4)
Hec Kilrea (2) – 19:35		Third period	No scoring
George Hainsworth		Goalie stats	Wilf Cude

March 28	Toronto Maple Leafs	5–1	Detroit Red Wings	Olympia Stadium	Recap
Joe Primeau (1) – pp – 14:09		First period	No scoring
Charlie Conacher (3) – pp – 16:47		Second period	No scoring
Joe Primeau (2) – pp – 05:44; Charlie Sands (1) – 08:25; Busher Jackson (1) – 19:29		Third period	09:37 – Cooney Weiland (1)
George Hainsworth		Goalie stats	Wilf Cude

March 30	Toronto Maple Leafs	0–1	Detroit Red Wings	Olympia Stadium	Recap
No scoring		First period	15:03 – pp – Ebbie Goodfellow (4)
No scoring		Second period	No scoring
No scoring		Third period	No scoring
George Hainsworth		Goalie stats	Wilf Cude

Detroit won series 3–2

==== (A2) Chicago Black Hawks vs. (C3) Montreal Maroons ====
March 28	Chicago Black Hawks	3–0	Montreal Maroons	Montreal Forum	Recap
Doc Romnes (1) – 00:43		First period	No scoring
Paul Thompson (1) – 01:00; Don McFadyen (1) – 03:25		Second period	No scoring
No scoring		Third period	No scoring
Charlie Gardiner		Goalie stats	Dave Kerr

April 1	Montreal Maroons	2–3	Chicago Black Hawks	Chicago Stadium	Recap
Baldy Northcott (1) – 11:22		First period	00:25 – Paul Thompson (2)
No scoring		Second period	05:30 – Don McFadyen (2)
Baldy Northcott (2) – 01:40		Third period	07:55 – Tom Cook (1)
Dave Kerr		Goalie stats	Charlie Gardiner

Chicago won series on total goals 6–2

=== Stanley Cup Finals ===
The Chicago Black Hawks beat the Detroit Red Wings three games to one with the fourth game going into double overtime. After regulation time in the fourth game, Black Hawks star goaltender and two-time Vezina Trophy winner, Charlie Gardiner, left the game because he wasn't feeling well. He died two months later of a brain hemorrhage.

April 3	Chicago Black Hawks	2–1	2OT	Detroit Red Wings	Olympia Stadium	Recap
Lionel Conacher (2) – 17:50		First period		No scoring
No scoring		Second period		No scoring
No scoring		Third period		04:40 – Herbie Lewis (5)
Paul Thompson (3) – 01:10		Second overtime period		No scoring
Charlie Gardiner		Goalie stats		Wilf Cude

April 5	Chicago Black Hawks	4–1	Detroit Red Wings	Olympia Stadium	Recap
Rosario Couture (1) – 17:51		First period	No scoring
No scoring		Second period	09:58 – Herbie Lewis (6)
Doc Romnes (2) – 01:28; Art Coulter (1) – 05:34; Johnny Gottselig (3) – 18:02		Third period	No scoring
Charlie Gardiner		Goalie stats	Wilf Cude

April 8	Detroit Red Wings	5–2	Chicago Black Hawks	Chicago Stadium	Recap
Gord Pettinger (1) – 06:07; Larry Aurie (2) – 08:40		First period	00:28 – Paul Thompson (4)
No scoring		Second period	18:07 – Johnny Gottselig (4)
Doug Young (1) – 13:50; Cooney Weiland (2) – 18:20; Larry Aurie (3) – 19:53		Third period	No scoring
Wilf Cude		Goalie stats	Charlie Gardiner

April 10	Detroit Red Wings	0–1	2OT	Chicago Black Hawks	Chicago Stadium	Recap
No scoring		First period		No scoring
No scoring		Second period		No scoring
No scoring		Third period		No scoring
No scoring		Second overtime period		10:05 – Mush March (2)
Wilf Cude		Goalie stats		Charlie Gardiner

Chicago won series 3–1

== Awards ==
Rookie of the Year:	Russ Blinco, Montreal Maroons
Hart Trophy: (Most valuable player)	Aurel Joliat, Montreal Canadiens
Lady Byng Trophy: (Excellence and sportsmanship)	Frank Boucher, New York Rangers
O'Brien Cup: (Canadian Division champion)	Toronto Maple Leafs
Prince of Wales Trophy: (American Division champion)	Detroit Red Wings
Vezina Trophy: (Fewest goals allowed)	Charlie Gardiner, Chicago Black Hawks

=== All-Star teams ===
First Team	Position	Second Team
Charlie Gardiner, Chicago Black Hawks	G	Roy Worters, New York Americans
King Clancy, Toronto Maple Leafs	D	Eddie Shore, Boston Bruins
Lionel Conacher, Chicago Black Hawks	D	Ching Johnson, New York Rangers
Frank Boucher, New York Rangers	C	Joe Primeau, Toronto Maple Leafs
Charlie Conacher, Toronto Maple Leafs	RW	Bill Cook, New York Rangers
Busher Jackson, Toronto Maple Leafs	LW	Aurel Joliat, Montreal Canadiens
Lester Patrick, New York Rangers	Coach	Dick Irvin, Toronto Maple Leafs

== Player statistics ==
=== Scoring leaders ===
Note: GP = Games played, G = Goals, A = Assists, PTS = Points, PIM = Penalties in minutes

Player	Team	GP	G	A	PTS	PIM
Charlie Conacher	Toronto Maple Leafs	42	32	20	52	38
Joe Primeau	Toronto Maple Leafs	45	14	32	46	8
Frank Boucher	New York Rangers	48	14	30	44	4
Marty Barry	Boston Bruins	48	27	12	39	12
Nels Stewart	Boston Bruins	48	22	17	39	68
Cecil Dillon	New York Rangers	48	13	26	39	10
Busher Jackson	Toronto Maple Leafs	38	20	18	38	38
Aurel Joliat	Montreal Canadiens	48	22	15	37	27
Hooley Smith	Montreal Maroons	47	18	19	37	58
Paul Thompson	Chicago Black Hawks	48	20	16	36	17

Source: NHL.

=== Leading goaltenders ===
Note: GP = Games played; Mins = Minutes played; GA = Goals against; SO = Shut outs; GAA = Goals against average

Player	Team	GP	Mins	GA	SO	GAA
Wilf Cude	Montreal, Detroit	30	1920	47	5	1.47
Charlie Gardiner	Chicago Black Hawks	48	3050	83	10	1.63
Roy Worters	New York Americans	36	2240	75	4	2.01
Lorne Chabot	Montreal Canadiens	47	2928	101	8	2.07
Andy Aitkenhead	New York Rangers	48	2990	76	7	2.27

Source: NHL.

== Coaches ==
=== American Division ===
- Boston Bruins: Art Ross
- Chicago Black Hawks: Tommy Gorman
- Detroit Red Wings: Jack Adams
- New York Rangers: Lester Patrick

=== Canadian Division ===
- Montreal Canadiens: Newsy Lalonde
- Montreal Maroons: Eddie Gerard
- New York Americans: Bullet Joe Simpson
- Ottawa Senators: George Boucher
- Toronto Maple Leafs: Dick Irvin

== Debuts ==
The following is a list of players of note who played their first NHL game in 1933–34 (listed with their first team, asterisk(*) marks debut in playoffs):

- Russ Blinco, Montreal Maroons
- Herb Cain, Montreal Maroons
- Lorne Carr, New York Rangers
- Flash Hollett, Toronto Maple Leafs

== Last games ==
The following is a list of players of note that played their last game in the NHL in 1933–34 (listed with their last team):

- Lionel Hitchman, Boston Bruins
- Percy Galbraith, Boston Bruins
- Charles Gardiner, Chicago Black Hawks
- Clarence Abel, Chicago Black Hawks
- George Hay, Detroit Red Wings
- Ace Bailey, Toronto Maple Leafs

== See also ==
- National Hockey League All-Star Game
- 1933–34 NHL transactions
- List of Stanley Cup champions
- 1933 in sports
- 1934 in sports
