= 1933–34 New York Americans season =

National Hockey League team season

1933–34 New York Americans
- Division: 4th Canadian
- 1933–34 record: 15–23–10
- Home record: 7–12–5
- Road record: 8–11–5
- Goals for: 104
- Goals against: 132

Team information
- Coach: Joe Simpson
- Captain: Red Dutton
- Arena: Madison Square Garden

Team leaders
- Goals: Eddie Burke (20)
- Assists: Maitland Conn (17)
- Points: Eddie Burke (30)
- Penalty minutes: Mervyn Dutton (65)
- Wins: Roy Worters (12)
- Goals against average: Roy Worters (2.01)

The 1933–34 New York Americans season was the Americans' ninth season of play. The Americans again did not qualify for the playoffs. This was the fifth-straight season that they missed the playoffs and the eighth time out of nine seasons.

== Regular season ==
=== Final standings ===
Canadian Division
| | GP | W | L | T | GF | GA | PTS |
|---|---|---|---|---|---|---|---|
| **Toronto Maple Leafs** | 48 | 26 | 13 | 9 | 174 | 119 | 61 |
| **Montreal Canadiens** | 48 | 22 | 20 | 6 | 99 | 101 | 50 |
| **Montreal Maroons** | 48 | 19 | 18 | 11 | 117 | 122 | 49 |
| New York Americans | 48 | 15 | 23 | 10 | 104 | 132 | 40 |
| Ottawa Senators | 48 | 13 | 29 | 6 | 115 | 143 | 32 |

Note: W = Wins, L = Losses, T = Ties, GF = Goals For, GA = Goals Against, Pts = Points
Teams that qualified for the playoffs are highlighted in bold.

=== Record vs. opponents ===
==== Vs. Canadian Division ====
1933–34 NHL records
| Team | **MTL** | **MTM** | **NYA** | **OTT** | **TOR** | **Total** |
|---|---|---|---|---|---|---|
| M. Canadiens | — | 2–3–1 | 5–1 | 3–1–2 | 4–2 | **14–7–3** |
| M. Maroons | 3–2–1 | — | 2–2–2 | 4–1–1 | 1–5 | **10–10–4** |
| N.Y. Americans | 1–5 | 2–2–2 | — | 4–2 | 0–3–3 | **7–12–5** |
| Ottawa | 1–3–2 | 1–4–1 | 2–4 | — | 2–4 | **6–15–3** |
| Toronto | 2–4 | 5–1 | 3–0–3 | 4–2 | — | **14–7–3** |

==== Vs. American Division ====
1933–34 NHL records
| Team | **BOS** | **CHI** | **DET** | **NYR** | **Total** |
|---|---|---|---|---|---|
| M. Canadiens | 1–5 | 2–3–1 | 3–2–1 | 2–3–1 | **8–13–3** |
| M. Maroons | 4–1–1 | 2–2–2 | 1–2–3 | 2–3–1 | **9–8–7** |
| N.Y. Americans | 3–3 | 1–3–2 | 0–3–3 | 4–2 | **8–11–5** |
| Ottawa | 4–2 | 0–4–2 | 2–4 | 1–4–1 | **7–14–3** |
| Toronto | 4–1–1 | 2–3–1 | 3–2–1 | 3–0–3 | **12–6–6** |

== Schedule and results ==
1933–34 regular season
November

| Game | Result | Date | Score | Opponent | Record |
|---|---|---|---|---|---|
| 1 | T | November 9, 1933 | 2–2 OT | @ Chicago Black Hawks (1933–34) | 0–0–1 |
| 2 | L | November 12, 1933 | 2–5 | @ Detroit Red Wings (1933–34) | 0–1–1 |
| 3 | T | November 16, 1933 | 2–2 OT | @ Montreal Maroons (1933–34) | 0–1–2 |
| 4 | T | November 19, 1933 | 2–2 OT | Montreal Maroons (1933–34) | 0–1–3 |
| 5 | L | November 23, 1933 | 0–2 | Chicago Black Hawks (1933–34) | 0–2–3 |
| 6 | W | November 25, 1933 | 3–2 | @ Ottawa Senators (1933–34) | 1–2–3 |
| 7 | L | November 28, 1933 | 3–7 | @ Toronto Maple Leafs (1933–34) | 1–3–3 |

December

| Game | Result | Date | Score | Opponent | Record |
|---|---|---|---|---|---|
| 8 | L | December 2, 1933 | 1–3 | @ Montreal Canadiens (1933–34) | 1–4–3 |
| 9 | L | December 5, 1933 | 1–9 | Toronto Maple Leafs (1933–34) | 1–5–3 |
| 10 | L | December 9, 1933 | 2–4 | @ Boston Bruins (1933–34) | 1–6–3 |
| 11 | L | December 10, 1933 | 2–5 | Ottawa Senators (1933–34) | 1–7–3 |
| 12 | W | December 12, 1933 | 3–0 | @ New York Rangers (1933–34) | 2–7–3 |
| 13 | L | December 14, 1933 | 4–5 OT | Boston Bruins (1933–34) | 2–8–3 |
| 14 | T | December 17, 1933 | 4–4 OT | @ Detroit Red Wings (1933–34) | 2–8–4 |
| 15 | L | December 19, 1933 | 0–1 | Detroit Red Wings (1933–34) | 2–9–4 |
| 16 | L | December 24, 1933 | 1–3 | New York Rangers (1933–34) | 2–10–4 |
| 17 | L | December 26, 1933 | 1–2 | Chicago Black Hawks (1933–34) | 2–11–4 |
| 18 | W | December 31, 1933 | 3–1 | @ New York Rangers (1933–34) | 3–11–4 |

January

| Game | Result | Date | Score | Opponent | Record |
|---|---|---|---|---|---|
| 19 | W | January 2, 1934 | 4–2 | Ottawa Senators (1933–34) | 4–11–4 |
| 20 | L | January 4, 1934 | 4–5 OT | Montreal Maroons (1933–34) | 4–12–4 |
| 21 | W | January 7, 1934 | 4–0 | Montreal Canadiens (1933–34) | 5–12–4 |
| 22 | W | January 9, 1934 | 2–1 | @ Boston Bruins (1933–34) | 6–12–4 |
| 23 | T | January 11, 1934 | 1–1 OT | Toronto Maple Leafs (1933–34) | 6–12–5 |
| 24 | T | January 13, 1934 | 2–2 OT | @ Toronto Maple Leafs (1933–34) | 6–12–6 |
| 25 | L | January 14, 1934 | 0–4 | @ Chicago Black Hawks (1933–34) | 6–13–6 |
| 26 | W | January 16, 1934 | 2–1 | New York Rangers (1933–34) | 7–13–6 |
| 27 | W | January 21, 1934 | 4–2 | Boston Bruins (1933–34) | 8–13–6 |
| 28 | L | January 23, 1934 | 2–6 | @ Montreal Canadiens (1933–34) | 8–14–6 |
| 29 | T | January 25, 1934 | 1–1 OT | Detroit Red Wings (1933–34) | 8–14–7 |
| 30 | L | January 27, 1934 | 1–2 OT | @ Montreal Maroons (1933–34) | 8–15–7 |
| 31 | W | January 30, 1934 | 3–2 | Montreal Maroons (1933–34) | 9–15–7 |

February

| Game | Result | Date | Score | Opponent | Record |
|---|---|---|---|---|---|
| 32 | L | February 4, 1934 | 0–2 | Montreal Canadiens (1933–34) | 9–16–7 |
| 33 | W | February 6, 1934 | 1–0 | @ Boston Bruins (1933–34) | 10–16–7 |
| 34 | T | February 8, 1934 | 3–3 OT | Toronto Maple Leafs (1933–34) | 10–16–8 |
| 35 | W | February 11, 1934 | 4–3 | @ New York Rangers (1933–34) | 11–16–8 |
| 36 | L | February 13, 1934 | 2–3 | @ Ottawa Senators (1933–34) | 11–17–8 |
| 37 | T | February 15, 1934 | 1–1 OT | Detroit Red Wings (1933–34) | 11–17–9 |
| 38 | W | February 17, 1934 | 4–2 | @ Montreal Maroons (1933–34) | 12–17–9 |
| 39 | W | February 20, 1934 | 3–1 | Chicago Black Hawks (1933–34) | 13–17–9 |
| 40 | T | February 22, 1934 | 0–0 OT | @ Chicago Black Hawks (1933–34) | 13–17–10 |
| 41 | L | February 25, 1934 | 1–2 OT | @ Detroit Red Wings (1933–34) | 13–18–10 |

March

| Game | Result | Date | Score | Opponent | Record |
|---|---|---|---|---|---|
| 42 | W | March 4, 1934 | 3–0 | Ottawa Senators (1933–34) | 14–18–10 |
| 43 | L | March 6, 1934 | 0–3 | @ Montreal Canadiens (1933–34) | 14–19–10 |
| 44 | L | March 8, 1934 | 2–3 | Montreal Canadiens (1933–34) | 14–20–10 |
| 45 | L | March 10, 1934 | 5–8 | @ Toronto Maple Leafs (1933–34) | 14–21–10 |
| 46 | L | March 13, 1934 | 1–2 | New York Rangers (1933–34) | 14–22–10 |
| 47 | W | March 15, 1934 | 3–2 | @ Ottawa Senators (1933–34) | 15–22–10 |
| 48 | L | March 18, 1934 | 5–9 | Boston Bruins (1933–34) | 15–23–10 |

Legend: Win (2 points) Loss (0 points) Tie (1 point)

== Player statistics ==
=== Regular season ===
Scoring

| Player | GP | G | A | Pts | PIM |
|---|---|---|---|---|---|
| Eddie Burke | 46 | 20 | 10 | 30 | 24 |
| Charley McVeigh | 48 | 15 | 12 | 27 | 4 |
| Normie Himes | 48 | 9 | 16 | 25 | 10 |
| Lloyd Klein | 48 | 13 | 9 | 22 | 34 |
| Red Conn | 48 | 4 | 17 | 21 | 12 |
| Ron Martin | 47 | 8 | 9 | 17 | 30 |
| Walter Jackson | 47 | 6 | 9 | 15 | 12 |
| Bill Brydge | 48 | 6 | 7 | 13 | 44 |
| Lloyd Gross | 21 | 7 | 3 | 10 | 10 |
| Bob Gracie | 24 | 4 | 6 | 10 | 10 |
| Art Chapman | 25 | 3 | 7 | 10 | 8 |
| Red Dutton | 48 | 2 | 8 | 10 | 65 |
| John Doran | 39 | 1 | 4 | 5 | 40 |
| Hal Picketts | 48 | 3 | 1 | 4 | 32 |
| George Patterson | 13 | 3 | 0 | 3 | 6 |
| Allan Murray | 39 | 1 | 1 | 2 | 20 |
| Duke Dukowski | 9 | 0 | 1 | 1 | 11 |
| Alec Connell | 1 | 0 | 0 | 0 | 0 |
| Abbie Cox | 1 | 0 | 0 | 0 | 0 |
| Benny Grant | 5 | 0 | 0 | 0 | 0 |
| Percy Jackson | 1 | 0 | 0 | 0 | 0 |
| Moe Roberts | 6 | 0 | 0 | 0 | 0 |
| Chris Speyer | 9 | 0 | 0 | 0 | 0 |
| Roy Worters | 36 | 0 | 0 | 0 | 0 |

Goaltending

| Player | MIN | GP | W | L | T | GA | GAA | SA | SV | SV% | SO |
|---|---|---|---|---|---|---|---|---|---|---|---|
| Roy Worters | 2240 | 36 | 12 | 13 | 10 | 75 | 2.01 | | | | 4 |
| Alec Connell | 40 | 1 | 1 | 0 | 0 | 2 | 3.00 | | | | 0 |
| Benny Grant | 320 | 5 | 1 | 4 | 0 | 18 | 3.38 | | | | 1 |
| Moe Roberts | 336 | 6 | 1 | 4 | 0 | 25 | 4.46 | | | | 0 |
| Abbie Cox | 24 | 1 | 0 | 1 | 0 | 3 | 7.50 | | | | 0 |
| Percy Jackson | 60 | 1 | 0 | 1 | 0 | 9 | 9.00 | | | | 0 |
| Team: | 3020 | 48 | 15 | 23 | 10 | 132 | 2.62 | | | | 5 |

== See also ==
- 1933–34 NHL season
