= 1933–34 Toronto Maple Leafs season =

NHL hockey team season

1933–34 Toronto Maple Leafs
- O'Brien Trophy winners
- Division: 1st Canadian
- 1933–34 record: 26–13–9
- Home record: 19–2–3
- Road record: 7–11–6
- Goals for: 174
- Goals against: 119

Team information
- General manager: Conn Smythe
- Coach: Dick Irvin
- Captain: Hap Day
- Arena: Maple Leaf Gardens

Team leaders
- Goals: Charlie Conacher (32)
- Assists: Joe Primeau (32)
- Points: Charlie Conacher (52)
- Penalty minutes: Red Horner (156)
- Wins: George Hainsworth (26)
- Goals against average: George Hainsworth (2.37)

The 1933–34 Toronto Maple Leafs season was Toronto's 17th season in the National Hockey League (NHL).

== Regular season ==
=== Final standings ===
Canadian Division
	GP	W	L	T	GF	GA	PTS
**Toronto Maple Leafs**	48	26	13	9	174	119	61
**Montreal Canadiens**	48	22	20	6	99	101	50
**Montreal Maroons**	48	19	18	11	117	122	49
New York Americans	48	15	23	10	104	132	40
Ottawa Senators	48	13	29	6	115	143	32

Note: W = Wins, L = Losses, T = Ties, GF = Goals For, GA = Goals Against, Pts = Points
Teams that qualified for the playoffs are highlighted in bold.

=== Record vs. opponents ===
==== Vs. Canadian Division ====
1933–34 NHL records
Team	MTL	MTM	NYA	OTT	TOR	Total
M. Canadiens	—	2–3–1	5–1	3–1–2	4–2	**14–7–3**
M. Maroons	3–2–1	—	2–2–2	4–1–1	1–5	**10–10–4**
N.Y. Americans	1–5	2–2–2	—	4–2	0–3–3	**7–12–5**
Ottawa	1–3–2	1–4–1	2–4	—	2–4	**6–15–3**
Toronto	2–4	5–1	3–0–3	4–2	—	**14–7–3**

==== Vs. American Division ====
1933–34 NHL records
Team	BOS	CHI	DET	NYR	Total
M. Canadiens	1–5	2–3–1	3–2–1	2–3–1	**8–13–3**
M. Maroons	4–1–1	2–2–2	1–2–3	2–3–1	**9–8–7**
N.Y. Americans	3–3	1–3–2	0–3–3	4–2	**8–11–5**
Ottawa	4–2	0–4–2	2–4	1–4–1	**7–14–3**
Toronto	4–1–1	2–3–1	3–2–1	3–0–3	**12–6–6**

== Schedule and results ==
1933–34 regular season
November

Game	Result	Date	Score	Opponent	Record
1	W	November 9, 1933	6–1	Boston Bruins (1933–34)	1–0–0
2	W	November 11, 1933	4–3	New York Rangers (1933–34)	2–0–0
3	W	November 18, 1933	4–1	Ottawa Senators (1933–34)	3–0–0
4	T	November 21, 1933	1–1 OT	@ New York Rangers (1933–34)	3–0–1
5	L	November 25, 1933	0–1	Montreal Canadiens (1933–34)	3–1–1
6	W	November 28, 1933	7–3	New York Americans (1933–34)	4–1–1
7	W	November 30, 1933	1–0	@ Montreal Maroons (1933–34)	5–1–1

December

Game	Result	Date	Score	Opponent	Record
8	W	December 2, 1933	8–3	Montreal Maroons (1933–34)	6–1–1
9	W	December 3, 1933	3–0	@ Detroit Red Wings (1933–34)	7–1–1
10	W	December 5, 1933	9–1	@ New York Americans (1933–34)	8–1–1
11	L	December 7, 1933	1–4	@ Ottawa Senators (1933–34)	8–2–1
12	W	December 9, 1933	1–0	Chicago Black Hawks (1933–34)	9–2–1
13	W	December 12, 1933	4–1	@ Boston Bruins (1933–34)	10–2–1
14	L	December 14, 1933	0–2	@ Montreal Canadiens (1933–34)	10–3–1
15	W	December 16, 1933	3–1	Montreal Canadiens (1933–34)	11–3–1
16	W	December 23, 1933	8–2	Montreal Maroons (1933–34)	12–3–1
17	T	December 26, 1933	2–2 OT	@ Boston Bruins (1933–34)	12–3–2
18	T	December 28, 1933	2–2 OT	@ New York Rangers (1933–34)	12–3–3
19	W	December 30, 1933	8–1	Detroit Red Wings (1933–34)	13–3–3

January

Game	Result	Date	Score	Opponent	Record
20	W	January 1, 1934	2–1	@ Chicago Black Hawks (1933–34)	14–3–3
21	L	January 4, 1934	1–4	@ Montreal Canadiens (1933–34)	14–4–3
22	W	January 6, 1934	7–3	Ottawa Senators (1933–34)	15–4–3
23	T	January 11, 1934	1–1 OT	@ New York Americans (1933–34)	15–4–4
24	T	January 13, 1934	2–2 OT	New York Americans (1933–34)	15–4–5
25	W	January 16, 1934	7–4 OT	@ Ottawa Senators (1933–34)	16–4–5
26	W	January 18, 1934	6–2	Boston Bruins (1933–34)	17–4–5
27	T	January 20, 1934	2–2 OT	Chicago Black Hawks (1933–34)	17–4–6
28	L	January 21, 1934	2–4 OT	@ Detroit Red Wings (1933–34)	17–5–6
29	W	January 23, 1934	8–4	Montreal Maroons (1933–34)	18–5–6
30	L	January 25, 1934	0–6	@ Montreal Maroons (1933–34)	18–6–6
31	T	January 27, 1934	2–2 OT	Detroit Red Wings (1933–34)	18–6–7
32	L	January 28, 1934	0–2	@ Chicago Black Hawks (1933–34)	18–7–7

February

Game	Result	Date	Score	Opponent	Record
33	T	February 1, 1934	5–5 OT	@ New York Rangers (1933–34)	18–7–8
34	W	February 3, 1934	8–4	Ottawa Senators (1933–34)	19–7–8
35	L	February 4, 1934	1–2	@ Detroit Red Wings (1933–34)	19–8–8
36	T	February 8, 1934	3–3 OT	@ New York Americans (1933–34)	19–8–9
37	W	February 10, 1934	4–2	Montreal Canadiens (1933–34)	20–8–9
38	W	February 17, 1934	6–4	Boston Bruins (1933–34)	21–8–9
39	L	February 20, 1934	2–3 OT	@ Montreal Canadiens (1933–34)	21–9–9
40	W	February 24, 1934	8–3	New York Rangers (1933–34)	22–9–9
41	W	February 27, 1934	2–1 OT	@ Montreal Maroons (1933–34)	23–9–9

March

Game	Result	Date	Score	Opponent	Record
42	W	March 3, 1934	6–4	Detroit Red Wings (1933–34)	24–9–9
43	L	March 6, 1934	2–7	@ Boston Bruins (1933–34)	24–10–9
44	L	March 8, 1934	1–3	@ Ottawa Senators (1933–34)	24–11–9
45	W	March 10, 1934	8–5	New York Americans (1933–34)	25–11–9
46	L	March 15, 1934	1–2	Chicago Black Hawks (1933–34)	25–12–9
47	W	March 17, 1934	3–2	New York Rangers (1933–34)	26–12–9
48	L	March 18, 1934	2–3	@ Chicago Black Hawks (1933–34)	26–13–9

Legend: Win (2 points) Loss (0 points) Tie (1 point)

== Player statistics ==
=== Regular season ===
Scoring

Player	Pos	GP	G	A	Pts	PIM
Charlie Conacher	RW	42	32	20	52	38
Joe Primeau	C	45	14	32	46	8
Busher Jackson	LW	38	20	18	38	38
King Clancy	D	46	11	17	28	62
Bill Thoms	C	47	8	18	26	24
Andy Blair	C	47	14	9	23	35
Hec Kilrea	LW	43	10	13	23	15
Baldy Cotton	LW	47	8	14	22	46
Red Horner	D	40	11	10	21	146
Buzz Boll	LW	42	12	8	20	21
Hap Day	D	48	9	10	19	35
Ken Doraty	F	34	9	10	19	6
Charlie Sands	C/RW	45	8	8	16	2
Alex Levinsky	D	47	5	11	16	38
Ace Bailey	RW	13	2	3	5	11
Jack Shill	C	7	0	1	1	0
George Hainsworth	G	48	0	0	0	0
Flash Hollett	D	4	0	0	0	4
Fred Robertson	D	2	0	0	0	0

Goaltending

Player	MIN	GP	W	L	T	GA	GAA	SO
George Hainsworth	3010	48	26	13	9	119	2.37	3
Team:	3010	48	26	13	9	119	2.37	3

=== Playoffs ===
Toronto would face Detroit WilRed Wings and goalie Wilf Cude in series A of the Playoffs. Game #1 Detroit 2 Toronto 1, #2 Detroit 6 Toronto 3, #3 Toronto 3 Detroit 1, #4Toronto 5 Detroit 1, #5 Detroit 1 Toronto 0. Cude faced 43, 53, 35, 30, and 15 shots for a save % of .932 and gaa of 2.38. Hainsworth faced 31, 28, 23, 15, and 22 shots for a save % of .908 and a gaa of 2.19. Cude faced an average of 35.2 shots per game, while Hainsworth faced 23.8 shots per game. Scoring

Player	Pos	GP	G	A	Pts	PIM
Joe Primeau	C	5	2	4	6	6
Charlie Conacher	RW	5	3	2	5	0
Ken Doraty	F	5	2	2	4	0
Hec Kilrea	LW	5	2	0	2	2
Andy Blair	C	5	0	2	2	16
Baldy Cotton	LW	5	0	2	2	0
Bill Thoms	C	5	0	2	2	0
Red Horner	D	5	1	0	1	6
Busher Jackson	LW	5	1	0	1	8
Charlie Sands	C/RW	5	1	0	1	0
Buzz Boll	LW	5	0	0	0	9
King Clancy	D	3	0	0	0	8
Hap Day	D	5	0	0	0	6
George Hainsworth	G	5	0	0	0	0
Alex Levinsky	D	5	0	0	0	6
Jack Shill	C	2	0	0	0	0

Goaltending

Player	MIN	GP	W	L	GA	GAA	SO
George Hainsworth	302	5	2	3	11	2.19	0
Team:	302	5	2	3	11	2.19	0

Note:

Pos = Position;GP = Games played; G = Goals; A = Assists; Pts = Points; PIM = Penalty minutes; +/- = Plus/minus; PPG = Power-play goals; SHG = Short-handed goals; GWG = Game-winning goals
Pos = Position;GP = Games played; Min, TOI = Minutes played; W = Wins; L = Losses; T,T/OT = Ties; OTL = Overtime losses; GA = Goals-against; GAA = Goals-against average; SO = Shutouts; SA = Shots against; SV = Shots saved;SV% = Save percentage;

== Playoffs ==
The Maple Leafs met the Detroit Red Wings in the second round in a best of five series and lost 3–2.

== Transactions ==
- October 1, 1933: Acquired George Hainsworth from the Montreal Canadiens for Lorne Chabot
- October 4, 1933: Acquired Hec Kilrea from the Ottawa Senators for Bob Gracie and $10,000
- November 13, 1933: Traded Fred Robertson to the Detroit Red Wings for $6,500
- December 9, 1933: Loaned Benny Grant to the New York Americans
- December 12, 1933: Loaned Dave Downie from the Syracuse Stars of the IHL
- January 2, 1934: Loaned Flash Hollett to the Ottawa Senators for the remainder of the season
- March 1, 1934: Signed Free Agent Bill Shill
- April 11, 1934: Traded Alex Levinsky to the New York Rangers for cash

== See also ==
- 1933–34 NHL season
