= 1934 Stanley Cup Final =

1934 ice hockey championship series

	1	2	3	4	Total
Detroit Red Wings	1**	1	5	0**	1
Chicago Black Hawks	2**	4	2	1**	3
- * – Denotes overtime period(s)
- Location(s): Detroit: Olympia Stadium (1, 2); Chicago: Chicago Stadium (3, 4)
- Format: best-of-five
- Coaches: Detroit: Jack Adams; Chicago: Tommy Gorman
- Captains: Detroit: Herbie Lewis; Chicago: Chuck Gardiner
- Dates: April 3–10, 1934
- Series-winning goal: Mush March (10:05, second OT)
- Hall of Famers: Black Hawks: Lionel Conacher (1994); Art Coulter (1974); Charlie Gardiner (1945); Red Wings: Ebbie Goodfellow (1963); Herbie Lewis (1989); Cooney Weiland (1971); Coaches: Jack Adams (1959, player); Tommy Gorman (1963)

The 1934 Stanley Cup Final was contested by the Chicago Black Hawks and the Detroit Red Wings. It was the Red Wings' first appearance in the Finals, and Chicago's second, after 1931. The Black Hawks won the best-of-five series 3–1 to win their first Stanley Cup.

== Paths to the Finals ==
Detroit defeated the Toronto Maple Leafs 3–2 in a best-of-five series to reach the Finals. Chicago defeated the Montreal Canadiens 4–3 and Montreal Maroons 6–2 in two game total-goals series to reach the Finals.

== Game summaries ==
Chicago's Chuck Gardiner would limit Detroit to just two goals in Chicago's three victories, including a shutout in the final game which went to double overtime. It was Mr. Gardiner's last game as he would die of a brain hemorrhage after the season. Game 4 set a new record for the longest scoreless tie in a Stanley Cup Final game, with the game ending after 30:05 of overtime (for a combined game length of 90:05). This record was not passed until Game 4 of the 1996 Stanley Cup Final.

April 3	Chicago Black Hawks	2–1	2OT	Detroit Red Wings	Olympia Stadium	Recap
Lionel Conacher (2) - 17:50		First period		No scoring
No scoring		Second period		No scoring
No scoring		Third period		4:40 - Herbie Lewis (5)
Paul Thompson (3) - 1:10		Second overtime period		No scoring
Charlie Gardiner		Goalie stats		Wilf Cude

April 5	Chicago Black Hawks	4–1	Detroit Red Wings	Olympia Stadium	Recap
Rosario Couture (1) - 17:51		First period	No scoring
No scoring		Second period	9:58 - Herbie Lewis (6)
Doc Romnes (2) - 1:28; Art Coulter (1) - 5:34; Johnny Gottselig (3) - 18:02		Third period	No scoring
Charlie Gardiner		Goalie stats	Wilf Cude

April 8	Detroit Red Wings	5–2	Chicago Black Hawks	Chicago Stadium	Recap
Gord Pettinger (1) - 6:07; Larry Aurie (2) - 8:40		First period	00:28 - Paul Thompson (4)
No scoring		Second period	18:07 - Johnny Gottselig (4)
Doug Young (1) - 13:50; Cooney Weiland (2) - 18:20; Larry Aurie (3) - 19:53		Third period	No scoring
Wilf Cude		Goalie stats	Charlie Gardiner

April 10	Detroit Red Wings	0–1	2OT	Chicago Black Hawks	Chicago Stadium	Recap
No scoring		First period		No scoring
No scoring		Second period		No scoring
No scoring		Third period		No scoring
No scoring		Second overtime period		10:05 - Mush March (2)
Wilf Cude		Goalie stats		Charlie Gardiner

Chicago won series 3–1

== Stanley Cup engraving ==
The 1934 Stanley Cup was presented to Black Hawks captain Charlie Gardiner by NHL President Frank Calder following the Black Hawks' 1–0 double overtime win over the Red Wings in game four.

The following Black Hawks players and staff had their names engraved on the Stanley Cup

1933–34 Chicago Black Hawks

=== Players ===
Centres

- 6 Elwyn Doc Romnes
- 9 Jack Leswick
- 11 Tom Cook
- 15 Don McFadyen

Wingers

- 5 Harold Mush March
- 4 John Sheppard
- 7 Rosie Lolo Couture
- 10 Bill Kendall
- 10 Leroy Goldsworthy
- 12 Paul Thompson
- 14 John Gottselig

Defencemen

- 2 Clarence Taffy Abel
- 3 Lionel Conacher
- 8 Roger Jenkins
- 16 Louis Trudel
- 17 Art Coulter

Goaltenders

- 1 Charlie "Chuck" Gardiner (Captain)
- 20 Joe Starke (Spare did not play)

=== Coaching and administrative staff ===
- Frederic McLaughlin (President/Owner), Tommy Gorman (Manager-Coach)
- Eddie Froelich (Trainer)
- Bill Tobin (Secretary-Treasurer)*
- Wilfred Calfish (Asst. Trainer)†

* Left off the Stanley Cup but included on the Stanley Cup picture. † Included on the mid-season picture, but missing from the Stanley Cup and the Stanley Cup picture.

=== Stanley Cup engraving ===
- Chuck Gardiner became the only goalie to be engraved on the Stanley Cup as a Captain. In 1948, Bill Durnan of the Montreal Canadiens became the last goalie to wear the "C" as captain. In the summer of 1948, NHL changed the rules, saying goaltenders can no longer serve as the captain. Only one goalie has served as captain since Roberto Luongo with Vancouver Canucks in 2009, 2010, but he could not wear the "C".
- Canadian Johnny Gottselig was the first Russian-born player (born in Odesa, then of Russian Empire, now of Ukraine) to win the Stanley Cup. Gottselig moved to Canada with his family at a very young age.
- Lionel Conacher's name was misspelt T. Conacher instead of L. Conacher. He was the 2nd player to win the Grey Cup and Stanley Cup as a player. Lionel Conacher scored 15 points as the Toronto Argonauts defeated Edmonton Esks 23–0 to win the Grey Cup 1921. (See Joe Miller, Carl Voss, Leo Dandurand, Norman Kwong & Wayne Gretzky, other persons who won both the Grey Cup and Stanley Cup.)
- Joe Starke never played in the NHL as a goalie, but his name is on the Stanley Cup. Some sources say Starke played 2 regular-season games at defence. The NHL officially says Starke did not play a game in the NHL at any position.
- Chicago did not add a ring; they just used up the rest of the ring put on by the New York Rangers the prior season. When the New York Rangers won the Cup in 1933, they put 2 rings on the cup, with the first listing the members. On the second ring, they included the following: "1933 marked the seventh consecutive year in which Lester Patrick had piloted the Rangers to the National Hockey League Playoffs". Chicago did not have room to include any playoff scores.

== See also ==
- 1933–34 NHL season

Preceded by New York Rangers; 1933	Chicago Black Hawks; Stanley Cup champions 1934	Succeeded by Montreal Maroons; 1935
