= 1933–34 Ottawa Senators season =

National Hockey League team season

1933–34 Ottawa Senators
- Division: 5th Canadian
- 1933–34 record: 13–29–6
- Home record: 9–13–2
- Road record: 4–16–4
- Goals for: 115
- Goals against: 143

Team information
- General manager: Dave Gill
- Coach: Buck Boucher
- Captain: Syd Howe
- Arena: Ottawa Auditorium

Team leaders
- Goals: Desse Roche (14)
- Assists: Max Kaminsky (17)
- Points: Earl Roche (29)
- Penalty minutes: Ralph Bowman (64)
- Wins: Bill Beveridge (13)
- Goals against average: Bill Beveridge (2.86)

The 1933–34 Ottawa Senators season was the team's 16th season in the NHL and 48th season of play overall. It was the last season to be played by the NHL franchise under the Senators' banner, as the franchise moved to St. Louis, Missouri, playing as the St. Louis Eagles the next season.

== Regular season ==
Before the season, the Sens replaced head coach Cy Denneny with former defenceman Buck Boucher. Ottawa-born player Syd Howe was named captain of the team. Cooney Weiland, who led the team in scoring the previous season held out, but was eventually signed, and scored only two goals in nine games before the Senators sent him to the Detroit Red Wings for Carl Voss.

The Senators was led offensively by Earl Roche, who had a team high 29 points, his brother Desse Roche scored a team-high 14 goals, while Max Kaminsky put up a team-high 17 assists. Frank Finnigan chipped in with ten goals, to reach 104 in his career.

Bill Beveridge took over the Senators' goaltending duties and won 13 games while posting three shutouts and a 2.86 GAA. In the Senators last game of the season at home, against the New York Americans, Americans goalie Roy Worters was injured and not able to play after the first period. The Senators let New York use Alex Connell, the Senators backup who had not played a minute all season long, and Connell played well enough to defeat the Senators 3–2. The last game of the season was a 2–2 draw against the Montreal Maroons at the Montreal Forum. Desse Roche scored the last goal for Ottawa on March 17, 1934.

After the season, the Senators announced that the NHL franchise would relocate to St. Louis, Missouri where they would become the St. Louis Eagles, after 16 seasons in the NHL. To fill the Auditorium, the organization kept an Ottawa Senators club in senior league play until 1954. Ottawa would not have an NHL team again until 1992, 58 years later.

== Standings ==
=== Final standings ===
Canadian Division
	GP	W	L	T	GF	GA	PTS
**Toronto Maple Leafs**	48	26	13	9	174	119	61
**Montreal Canadiens**	48	22	20	6	99	101	50
**Montreal Maroons**	48	19	18	11	117	122	49
New York Americans	48	15	23	10	104	132	40
Ottawa Senators	48	13	29	6	115	143	32

Note: W = Wins, L = Losses, T = Ties, GF = Goals For, GA = Goals Against, Pts = Points
Teams that qualified for the playoffs are highlighted in bold.

=== Record vs. opponents ===
==== Vs. Canadian Division ====
1933–34 NHL records
Team	MTL	MTM	NYA	OTT	TOR	Total
M. Canadiens	—	2–3–1	5–1	3–1–2	4–2	**14–7–3**
M. Maroons	3–2–1	—	2–2–2	4–1–1	1–5	**10–10–4**
N.Y. Americans	1–5	2–2–2	—	4–2	0–3–3	**7–12–5**
Ottawa	1–3–2	1–4–1	2–4	—	2–4	**6–15–3**
Toronto	2–4	5–1	3–0–3	4–2	—	**14–7–3**

==== Vs. American Division ====
1933–34 NHL records
Team	BOS	CHI	DET	NYR	Total
M. Canadiens	1–5	2–3–1	3–2–1	2–3–1	**8–13–3**
M. Maroons	4–1–1	2–2–2	1–2–3	2–3–1	**9–8–7**
N.Y. Americans	3–3	1–3–2	0–3–3	4–2	**8–11–5**
Ottawa	4–2	0–4–2	2–4	1–4–1	**7–14–3**
Toronto	4–1–1	2–3–1	3–2–1	3–0–3	**12–6–6**

== Schedule and results ==
1933–34 regular season
November: 3–7–0 (home: 3–3–0; road: 0–4–0)

Game	Date	Visitor	Score	Home	OT	Decision	Attendance	Arena	Record	Pts
1	November 11	Canadiens	0–2	Ottawa		Beveridge	N/A	Ottawa Auditorium	1–0–0	2
2	November 14	Maroons	2–4	Ottawa		Beveridge	N/A	Ottawa Auditorium	2–0–0	4
3	November 16	Chicago	2–1	Ottawa		Beveridge	N/A	Ottawa Auditorium	2–1–0	4
4	November 18	Ottawa	1–4	Toronto		Beveridge	N/A	Maple Leaf Gardens	2–2–0	4
5	November 19	Ottawa	1–2	Chicago		Beveridge	N/A	Chicago Stadium	2–3–0	4
6	November 21	Detroit	3–2	Ottawa		Beveridge	N/A	Ottawa Auditorium	2–4–0	4
7	November 23	Ottawa	0–1	Canadiens		Beveridge	N/A	Montreal Forum	2–5–0	4
8	November 25	Americans	3–2	Ottawa		Beveridge	N/A	Ottawa Auditorium	2–6–0	4
9	November 28	Ottawa	1–2	Boston		Beveridge	N/A	Boston Garden	2–7–0	4
10	November 30	Boston	1–2	Ottawa	OT	Beveridge	N/A	Ottawa Auditorium	3–7–0	6

December: 3–2–4 (home: 1–1–2; road: 2–1–2)

Game	Date	Visitor	Score	Home	OT	Decision	Attendance	Arena	Record	Pts
11	December 7	Toronto	1–4	Ottawa		Beveridge	N/A	Ottawa Auditorium	4–7–0	8
12	December 10	Ottawa	5–2	Americans		Beveridge	N/A	Madison Square Garden	5–7–0	10
13	December 12	Canadiens	1–1	Ottawa	OT	Beveridge	N/A	Ottawa Auditorium	5–7–1	11
14	December 14	Rangers	4–3	Ottawa		Beveridge	N/A	Ottawa Auditorium	5–8–1	11
15	December 16	Ottawa	2–3	Maroons		Beveridge	N/A	Montreal Forum	5–9–1	11
16	December 19	Chicago	2–2	Ottawa	OT	Beveridge	N/A	Ottawa Auditorium	5–9–2	12
17	December 21	Ottawa	0–0	Rangers	OT	Beveridge	N/A	Madison Square Garden	5–9–3	13
18	December 25	Ottawa	6–3	Detroit		Beveridge	N/A	Detroit Olympia	6–9–3	15
19	December 28	Ottawa	2–2	Chicago	OT	Beveridge	N/A	Chicago Stadium	6–9–4	16

January: 2–8–1 (home: 2–4–0; road: 0–4–1)

Game	Date	Visitor	Score	Home	OT	Decision	Attendance	Arena	Record	Pts
20	January 2	Ottawa	2–4	Americans		Beveridge	N/A	Madison Square Garden	6–10–4	16
21	January 4	Boston	2–9	Ottawa		Beveridge	N/A	Ottawa Auditorium	7–10–4	18
22	January 6	Ottawa	3–7	Toronto		Beveridge	N/A	Maple Leaf Gardens	7–11–4	18
23	January 7	Ottawa	0–2	Detroit		Beveridge	N/A	Detroit Olympia	7–12–4	18
24	January 11	Rangers	5–3	Ottawa		Beveridge	N/A	Ottawa Auditorium	7–13–4	18
25	January 13	Ottawa	0–0	Canadiens	OT	Beveridge	N/A	Montreal Forum	7–13–5	19
26	January 16	Toronto	7–4	Ottawa	OT	Beveridge	N/A	Ottawa Auditorium	7–14–5	19
27	January 20	Detroit	4–5	Ottawa		Beveridge	N/A	Ottawa Auditorium	8–14–5	21
28	January 23	Ottawa	2–5	Rangers		Beveridge	N/A	Madison Square Garden	8–15–5	21
29	January 25	Rangers	6–3	Ottawa		Beveridge	N/A	Ottawa Auditorium	8–16–5	21
30	January 30	Chicago	2–0	Ottawa		Beveridge	N/A	Ottawa Auditorium	8–17–5	21

February: 3–8–0 (home: 2–4–0; road: 1–4–0)

Game	Date	Visitor	Score	Home	OT	Decision	Attendance	Arena	Record	Pts
31	February 1	Maroons	3–1	Ottawa		Beveridge	N/A	Ottawa Auditorium	8–18–5	21
32	February 3	Ottawa	4–8	Toronto		Beveridge	N/A	Maple Leaf Gardens	8–19–5	21
33	February 6	Ottawa	2–6	Maroons		Beveridge	N/A	Montreal Forum	8–20–5	21
34	February 10	Detroit	3–0	Ottawa		Beveridge	N/A	Detroit Olympia	8–21–5	21
35	February 13	Americans	2–3	Ottawa		Beveridge	N/A	Ottawa Auditorium	9–21–5	23
36	February 15	Ottawa	2–5	Chicago		Beveridge	N/A	Chicago Stadium	9–22–5	23
37	February 18	Ottawa	2–5	Detroit	OT	Beveridge	N/A	Detroit Olympia	9–23–5	23
38	February 20	Maroons	6–2	Ottawa		Beveridge	N/A	Ottawa Auditorium	9–24–5	23
39	February 22	Ottawa	3–1	Boston	OT	Beveridge	N/A	Boston Garden	10–24–5	25
40	February 24	Boston	4–9	Ottawa		Beveridge	N/A	Ottawa Auditorium	11–24–5	27
41	February 27	Canadiens	3–1	Ottawa	OT	Beveridge	N/A	Ottawa Auditorium	11–25–5	27

March: 2–4–1 (home: 1–1–0; road: 1–3–1)

Game	Date	Visitor	Score	Home	OT	Decision	Attendance	Arena	Record	Pts
42	March 4	Ottawa	0–3	Americans		Beveridge	N/A	Madison Square Garden	11–26–5	25
43	March 6	Ottawa	5–4	Rangers	OT	Beveridge	N/A	Madison Square Garden	12–26–5	27
44	March 8	Toronto	1–3	Ottawa		Beveridge	N/A	Ottawa Auditorium	13–26–5	31
45	March 10	Ottawa	2–3	Canadiens	OT	Beveridge	N/A	Montreal Forum	13–27–5	31
46	March 13	Ottawa	1–2	Boston		Beveridge	N/A	Boston Garden	13–28–5	31
47	March 15	Americans	3–2	Ottawa		Beveridge	N/A	Ottawa Auditorium	13–29–5	31
48	March 17	Ottawa	2–2	Maroons	OT	Beveridge	N/A	Montreal Forum	13–29–6	32

Legend: Win (2 points) Loss (0 points) Tie (1 point)

== Player statistics ==
=== Regular season ===
Scoring

Player	Pos	GP	G	A	Pts	PIM
Earl Roche	LW	45	13	16	29	22
Gerry Shannon	LW	48	11	15	26	26
Max Kaminsky	C	38	9	17	26	14
Des Roche	RW	46	14	10	24	22
Carl Voss	C	40	7	16	23	10
Syd Howe	C/LW	42	13	7	20	18
Bill Touhey	LW	46	12	8	20	21
Frank Finnigan	RW	48	10	10	20	10
Nick Wasnie	RW	37	11	6	17	10
Flash Hollett	D	30	7	4	11	21
Al Shields	D	47	4	7	11	44
Albert Leduc	D	32	1	3	4	34
Ted Saunders	RW	18	1	3	4	4
Danny Cox	LW	29	0	4	4	0
Walter Kalbfleisch	D	22	0	4	4	20
Cooney Weiland	C	9	2	0	2	4
Ralph Bowman	D	46	0	2	2	64
Bud Cook	C	18	1	0	1	8
Bill Beveridge	G	48	0	0	0	0
Percy Galbraith	LW/D	2	0	0	0	0
Bert McInenly	LW/D	2	0	0	0	0

Goaltending

Player	Min	GP	W	L	T	GA	GAA	SO
Bill Beveridge	3000	48	13	29	6	143	2.86	3
Team:	3000	48	13	29	6	143	2.86	3

Note:

Pos = Position;GP = Games played; G = Goals; A = Assists; Pts = Points; PIM = Penalty minutes; +/- = Plus/minus; PPG = Power-play goals; SHG = Short-handed goals; GWG = Game-winning goals
Pos = Position;GP = Games played; Min, TOI = Minutes played; W = Wins; L = Losses; T,T/OT = Ties; OTL = Overtime losses; GA = Goals-against; GAA = Goals-against average; SO = Shutouts; SA = Shots against; SV = Shots saved;SV% = Save percentage;

== Awards and records ==
Milestones

- Frank Finnigan, 100th NHL goal

== Transactions ==
The Senators were involved in the following transactions during the 1933–34 season.

=== Trades ===
July 1, 1933	To Ottawa Senators Carl Voss	To Detroit Red Wings Cooney Weiland
October 4, 1933	To Ottawa Senators Bob Gracie $10,000	To Toronto Maple Leafs Hec Kilrea
October 4, 1933	To Ottawa Senators Bud Cook; Percy Galbraith; Ted Saunders	To Boston Bruins Bob Gracie
October 22, 1933	To Ottawa Senators Albert Leduc	To Montreal Canadiens Cash
November 1, 1933	To Ottawa Senators Cash	To Boston Bruins Bert McInenly
December 1, 1933	To Ottawa Senators Cash	To Detroit Red Wings Ted Saunders
February 15, 1934	To Ottawa Senators Cash	To Detroit Red Wings Loan of Albert Leduc
April 9, 1934	To Ottawa Senators Cash	To Montreal Canadiens Albert Leduc

=== Free agents signed ===
May 10, 1933	From Niagara Falls Cataracts (OHA Sr.) Gerry Shannon
May 10, 1933	From Niagara Falls Cataracts (OHA Sr.) Walter Kalbfleisch
December 4, 1933	From Niagara Falls Cataracts (OHA Sr.) Max Kaminsky

== See also ==
- 1933–34 NHL season
- History of the National Hockey League
