= 1933–34 Montreal Canadiens season =

NHL hockey team season

1933–34 Montreal Canadiens
- Division: 3rd Canadian
- 1933–34 record: 22–20–6
- Home record: 16–6–2
- Road record: 6–14–4
- Goals for: 99
- Goals against: 101

Team information
- General manager: Leo Dandurand
- Coach: Newsy Lalonde
- Captain: Sylvio Mantha
- Arena: Montreal Forum

Team leaders
- Goals: Aurel Joliat (21)
- Assists: Aurel Joliat; Johnny Gagnon (15)
- Points: Aurel Joliat (36)
- Penalty minutes: Gerald Carson (47)
- Wins: Lorne Chabot (21)
- Goals against average: Lorne Chabot (2.07)

The 1933–34 Montreal Canadiens season was the team's 25th season of play. The Canadiens again qualified for the playoffs, finishing third in their division. The club met and lost to the Chicago Black Hawks in the playoffs.

== Regular season ==
Star player Howie Morenz continued the decline in his play, and was placed on the second line. His ankle was seriously injured on January 2, 1934, and he missed nine games but did not play well for the rest of the season. He was the target of trade speculation at the end of the season, with the Boston Bruins, Chicago Blackhawks, Detroit Red Wings and New York Rangers all interested in him.

=== Final standings ===
Canadian Division
	GP	W	L	T	GF	GA	PTS
**Toronto Maple Leafs**	48	26	13	9	174	119	61
**Montreal Canadiens**	48	22	20	6	99	101	50
**Montreal Maroons**	48	19	18	11	117	122	49
New York Americans	48	15	23	10	104	132	40
Ottawa Senators	48	13	29	6	115	143	32

Note: W = Wins, L = Losses, T = Ties, GF = Goals For, GA = Goals Against, Pts = Points
Teams that qualified for the playoffs are highlighted in bold.

=== Record vs. opponents ===
==== Vs. Canadian Division ====
1933–34 NHL records
Team	**MTL**	**MTM**	**NYA**	**OTT**	**TOR**	**Total**
M. Canadiens	—	2–3–1	5–1	3–1–2	4–2	**14–7–3**
M. Maroons	3–2–1	—	2–2–2	4–1–1	1–5	**10–10–4**
N.Y. Americans	1–5	2–2–2	—	4–2	0–3–3	**7–12–5**
Ottawa	1–3–2	1–4–1	2–4	—	2–4	**6–15–3**
Toronto	2–4	5–1	3–0–3	4–2	—	**14–7–3**

==== Vs. American Division ====
1933–34 NHL records
Team	**BOS**	**CHI**	**DET**	**NYR**	**Total**
M. Canadiens	1–5	2–3–1	3–2–1	2–3–1	**8–13–3**
M. Maroons	4–1–1	2–2–2	1–2–3	2–3–1	**9–8–7**
N.Y. Americans	3–3	1–3–2	0–3–3	4–2	**8–11–5**
Ottawa	4–2	0–4–2	2–4	1–4–1	**7–14–3**
Toronto	4–1–1	2–3–1	3–2–1	3–0–3	**12–6–6**

== Schedule and results ==
1933–34 regular season
November

Game	Result	Date	Score	Opponent	Record
1	W	November 9, 1933	2–1	Detroit Red Wings (1933–34)	1–0–0
2	L	November 11, 1933	0–2	@ Ottawa Senators (1933–34)	1–1–0
3	W	November 14, 1933	3–1	Chicago Black Hawks (1933–34)	2–1–0
4	L	November 18, 1933	1–2	Boston Bruins (1933–34)	2–2–0
5	W	November 21, 1933	5–0	Montreal Maroons (1933–34)	3–2–0
6	W	November 23, 1933	1–0	Ottawa Senators (1933–34)	4–2–0
7	W	November 25, 1933	1–0	@ Toronto Maple Leafs (1933–34)	5–2–0
8	L	November 26, 1933	2–4	@ Detroit Red Wings (1933–34)	5–3–0
9	L	November 28, 1933	1–4	@ Montreal Maroons (1933–34)	5–4–0

December

Game	Result	Date	Score	Opponent	Record
10	W	December 2, 1933	3–1	New York Americans (1933–34)	6–4–0
11	L	December 5, 1933	2–5	@ Boston Bruins (1933–34)	6–5–0
12	T	December 7, 1933	0–0 OT	@ New York Rangers (1933–34)	6–5–1
13	L	December 9, 1933	2–4	New York Rangers (1933–34)	6–6–1
14	T	December 12, 1933	1–1 OT	@ Ottawa Senators (1933–34)	6–6–2
15	W	December 14, 1933	2–0	Toronto Maple Leafs (1933–34)	7–6–2
16	L	December 16, 1933	1–3	@ Toronto Maple Leafs (1933–34)	7–7–2
17	L	December 17, 1933	1–4	@ Chicago Black Hawks (1933–34)	7–8–2
18	W	December 23, 1933	3–0	Detroit Red Wings (1933–34)	8–8–2
19	L	December 28, 1933	3–4	Boston Bruins (1933–34)	8–9–2
20	T	December 30, 1933	2–2 OT	@ Montreal Maroons (1933–34)	8–9–3

January

Game	Result	Date	Score	Opponent	Record
21	L	January 2, 1934	2–3	@ New York Rangers (1933–34)	8–10–3
22	W	January 4, 1934	4–1	Toronto Maple Leafs (1933–34)	9–10–3
23	L	January 7, 1934	0–4	@ New York Americans (1933–34)	9–11–3
24	W	January 9, 1934	3–2	@ Montreal Maroons (1933–34)	10–11–3
25	T	January 13, 1934	0–0 OT	Ottawa Senators (1933–34)	10–11–4
26	L	January 16, 1934	0–4	@ Boston Bruins (1933–34)	10–12–4
27	W	January 20, 1934	5–4	New York Rangers (1933–34)	11–12–4
28	W	January 23, 1934	6–2	New York Americans (1933–34)	12–12–4
29	L	January 25, 1934	1–2 OT	@ Chicago Black Hawks (1933–34)	12–13–4
30	T	January 28, 1934	3–3 OT	@ Detroit Red Wings (1933–34)	12–13–5

February

Game	Result	Date	Score	Opponent	Record
31	T	February 1, 1934	3–3 OT	Chicago Black Hawks (1933–34)	12–13–6
32	W	February 4, 1934	2–0	@ New York Americans (1933–34)	13–13–6
33	L	February 6, 1934	0–3	@ New York Rangers (1933–34)	13–14–6
34	L	February 8, 1934	2–3 OT	Montreal Maroons (1933–34)	13–15–6
35	L	February 10, 1934	2–4	@ Toronto Maple Leafs (1933–34)	13–16–6
36	L	February 11, 1934	1–4	@ Chicago Black Hawks (1933–34)	13–17–6
37	W	February 15, 1934	5–2	New York Rangers (1933–34)	14–17–6
38	W	February 20, 1934	3–2 OT	Toronto Maple Leafs (1933–34)	15–17–6
39	L	February 22, 1934	0–1	Montreal Maroons (1933–34)	15–18–6
40	W	February 24, 1934	3–2 OT	Chicago Black Hawks (1933–34)	16–18–6
41	W	February 27, 1934	3–1 OT	@ Ottawa Senators (1933–34)	17–18–6

March

Game	Result	Date	Score	Opponent	Record
42	L	March 1, 1934	1–3	@ Boston Bruins (1933–34)	17–19–6
43	W	March 3, 1934	2–1	Boston Bruins (1933–34)	18–19–6
44	W	March 6, 1934	3–0	New York Americans (1933–34)	19–19–6
45	W	March 8, 1934	3–2	@ New York Americans (1933–34)	20–19–6
46	W	March 10, 1934	3–2 OT	Ottawa Senators (1933–34)	21–19–6
47	L	March 15, 1934	1–4	Detroit Red Wings (1933–34)	21–20–6
48	W	March 18, 1934	2–1	@ Detroit Red Wings (1933–34)	22–20–6

Legend: Win (2 points) Loss (0 points) Tie (1 point)

== Playoffs ==
In the first round the Canadiens met the eventual Stanley Cup champion Chicago Blackhawks, who had placed second in the American Division. The Canadiens lost the two-games total-goals series 3–4 (2–3, 1–1). Morenz missed the second game due to a broken thumb.

=== Chicago Blackhawks vs. Montreal Canadiens ===
Date	Visitor	Home	Score	Record
March 22	Chicago Blackhawks	Montreal Canadiens	2–3	2–3
March 25	Montreal Canadiens	Chicago Blackhawks	1–1	3–4

== Player statistics ==
=== Regular season ===
==== Scoring ====
Player	Pos	GP	G	A	Pts	PIM
Aurel Joliat	LW	48	22	15	37	27
Wildor Larochelle	RW	48	16	11	27	27
Johnny Gagnon	RW	48	9	15	24	25
Howie Morenz	C	39	8	13	21	21
Pit Lepine	C	48	10	8	18	44
Jack Riley	C	48	6	11	17	4
Georges Mantha	D/LW	44	6	9	15	12
Sylvio Mantha	D	48	4	6	10	24
Armand Mondou	LW	48	5	3	8	4
Leo Bourgeault	D	48	4	3	7	10
Gerry Carson	D	48	5	1	6	51
Marty Burke	D	45	1	4	5	28
Sam Godin	RW	36	2	2	4	15
Jack Portland	D	31	0	2	2	10
Paul Raymond	RW	29	1	0	1	2
Lorne Chabot	G	47	0	0	0	2
Wilf Cude	G	1	0	0	0	0
Adie Lafrance	LW	3	0	0	0	2

==== Goaltending ====
Player	MIN	GP	W	L	T	GA	GAA	SO
Lorne Chabot	2928	47	21	20	6	101	2.07	8
Wilf Cude	60	1	1	0	0	0	0.00	1
Team:	2988	48	22	20	6	101	2.03	9

=== Playoffs ===
==== Scoring ====
Player	Pos	GP	G	A	Pts	PIM
Wildor Larochelle	RW	2	1	1	2	0
Howie Morenz	C	2	1	1	2	0
Johnny Gagnon	RW	2	1	0	1	2
Marty Burke	D	2	0	1	1	2
Aurel Joliat	LW	3	0	1	1	0
Armand Mondou	LW	1	0	1	1	0
Jack Riley	C	2	0	1	1	0
Leo Bourgeault	D	2	0	0	0	0
Gerry Carson	D	2	0	0	0	2
Lorne Chabot	G	2	0	0	0	0
Adie Lafrance	LW	2	0	0	0	0
Pit Lepine	C	2	0	0	0	0
Sylvio Mantha	D	2	0	0	0	2
Jack Portland	D	2	0	0	0	0
Paul Raymond	RW	2	0	0	0	0

==== Goaltending ====
Player	MIN	GP	W	L	GA	GAA	SO
Lorne Chabot	131	2	0	1	4	1.83	0
Team:	131	2	0	1	4	1.83	0

Note:

Pos = Position;GP = Games played; G = Goals; A = Assists; Pts = Points; PIM = Penalty minutes; +/- = Plus/minus; PPG = Power-play goals; SHG = Short-handed goals; GWG = Game-winning goals
Pos = Position;GP = Games played; Min, TOI = Minutes played; W = Wins; L = Losses; T,T/OT = Ties; OTL = Overtime losses; GA = Goals-against; GAA = Goals-against average; SO = Shutouts; SA = Shots against; SV = Shots saved;SV% = Save percentage;

== Transactions ==
- George Hainsworth was traded to Toronto for Lorne Chabot, October 1, 1933.
- Wilf Cude received by Canadiens from Philadelphia for cash, October 19, 1933.
- Wilf Cude loaned to Detroit by Canadiens January 2, 1934

== See also ==
- 1933–34 NHL season
