= 1933–34 Montreal Maroons season =

NHL team season

1933–34 Montreal Maroons
- Division: 3rd Canadian
- 1933–34 record: 19–18–11
- Home record: 11–6–7
- Road record: 8–12–4
- Goals for: 117
- Goals against: 122

Team information
- Coach: Eddie Gerard
- Captain: Hooley Smith
- Arena: Montreal Forum

Team leaders
- Goals: Baldy Northcott (20)
- Assists: Hooley Smith (19)
- Points: Hooley Smith (37)
- Penalty minutes: Hooley Smith (52)
- Wins: Dave Kerr (19)
- Goals against average: Dave Kerr (2.39)

The 1933–34 Montreal Maroons season was the 10th season for the National Hockey League (NHL) franchise.

== Regular season ==
=== Final standings ===
Canadian Division
| | GP | W | L | T | GF | GA | PTS |
|---|---|---|---|---|---|---|---|
| **Toronto Maple Leafs** | 48 | 26 | 13 | 9 | 174 | 119 | 61 |
| **Montreal Canadiens** | 48 | 22 | 20 | 6 | 99 | 101 | 50 |
| **Montreal Maroons** | 48 | 19 | 18 | 11 | 117 | 122 | 49 |
| New York Americans | 48 | 15 | 23 | 10 | 104 | 132 | 40 |
| Ottawa Senators | 48 | 13 | 29 | 6 | 115 | 143 | 32 |

Note: W = Wins, L = Losses, T = Ties, GF = Goals For, GA = Goals Against, Pts = Points
Teams that qualified for the playoffs are highlighted in bold.

=== Record vs. opponents ===
==== Vs. Canadian Division ====
1933–34 NHL records
| Team | **MTL** | **MTM** | **NYA** | **OTT** | **TOR** | **Total** |
|---|---|---|---|---|---|---|
| M. Canadiens | — | 2–3–1 | 5–1 | 3–1–2 | 4–2 | **14–7–3** |
| M. Maroons | 3–2–1 | — | 2–2–2 | 4–1–1 | 1–5 | **10–10–4** |
| N.Y. Americans | 1–5 | 2–2–2 | — | 4–2 | 0–3–3 | **7–12–5** |
| Ottawa | 1–3–2 | 1–4–1 | 2–4 | — | 2–4 | **6–15–3** |
| Toronto | 2–4 | 5–1 | 3–0–3 | 4–2 | — | **14–7–3** |

==== Vs. American Division ====
1933–34 NHL records
| Team | **BOS** | **CHI** | **DET** | **NYR** | **Total** |
|---|---|---|---|---|---|
| M. Canadiens | 1–5 | 2–3–1 | 3–2–1 | 2–3–1 | **8–13–3** |
| M. Maroons | 4–1–1 | 2–2–2 | 1–2–3 | 2–3–1 | **9–8–7** |
| N.Y. Americans | 3–3 | 1–3–2 | 0–3–3 | 4–2 | **8–11–5** |
| Ottawa | 4–2 | 0–4–2 | 2–4 | 1–4–1 | **7–14–3** |
| Toronto | 4–1–1 | 2–3–1 | 3–2–1 | 3–0–3 | **12–6–6** |

== Schedule and results ==
1933–34 regular season
November

| Game | Result | Date | Score | Opponent | Record |
|---|---|---|---|---|---|
| 1 | W | November 11, 1933 | 3–2 | Boston Bruins (1933–34) | 1–0–0 |
| 2 | L | November 14, 1933 | 2–4 | @ Ottawa Senators (1933–34) | 1–1–0 |
| 3 | T | November 16, 1933 | 2–2 OT | New York Americans (1933–34) | 1–1–1 |
| 4 | T | November 19, 1933 | 2–2 OT | @ New York Americans (1933–34) | 1–1–2 |
| 5 | L | November 21, 1933 | 0–5 | @ Montreal Canadiens (1933–34) | 1–2–2 |
| 6 | W | November 25, 1933 | 1–0 | New York Rangers (1933–34) | 2–2–2 |
| 7 | W | November 28, 1933 | 4–1 | Montreal Canadiens (1933–34) | 3–2–2 |
| 8 | L | November 30, 1933 | 0–1 | Toronto Maple Leafs (1933–34) | 3–3–2 |

December

| Game | Result | Date | Score | Opponent | Record |
|---|---|---|---|---|---|
| 9 | L | December 2, 1933 | 3–8 | @ Toronto Maple Leafs (1933–34) | 3–4–2 |
| 10 | T | December 5, 1933 | 1–1 OT | Detroit Red Wings (1933–34) | 3–4–3 |
| 11 | L | December 7, 1933 | 1–3 | @ Chicago Black Hawks (1933–34) | 3–5–3 |
| 12 | L | December 10, 1933 | 1–3 | @ Detroit Red Wings (1933–34) | 3–6–3 |
| 13 | W | December 16, 1933 | 3–2 | Ottawa Senators (1933–34) | 4–6–3 |
| 14 | L | December 19, 1933 | 0–1 OT | @ Boston Bruins (1933–34) | 4–7–3 |
| 15 | T | December 21, 1933 | 0–0 OT | Chicago Black Hawks (1933–34) | 4–7–4 |
| 16 | L | December 23, 1933 | 2–8 | @ Toronto Maple Leafs (1933–34) | 4–8–4 |
| 17 | L | December 25, 1933 | 0–3 | @ New York Rangers (1933–34) | 4–9–4 |
| 18 | T | December 30, 1933 | 2–2 OT | Montreal Canadiens (1933–34) | 4–9–5 |

January

| Game | Result | Date | Score | Opponent | Record |
|---|---|---|---|---|---|
| 19 | W | January 2, 1934 | 1–0 | @ Boston Bruins (1933–34) | 5–9–5 |
| 20 | W | January 4, 1934 | 5–4 OT | @ New York Americans (1933–34) | 6–9–5 |
| 21 | W | January 6, 1934 | 4–2 | Boston Bruins (1933–34) | 7–9–5 |
| 22 | L | January 9, 1934 | 2–3 | Montreal Canadiens (1933–34) | 7–10–5 |
| 23 | T | January 11, 1934 | 1–1 OT | Detroit Red Wings (1933–34) | 7–10–6 |
| 24 | L | January 14, 1934 | 1–3 | @ New York Rangers (1933–34) | 7–11–6 |
| 25 | W | January 16, 1934 | 6–5 OT | Chicago Black Hawks (1933–34) | 8–11–6 |
| 26 | T | January 18, 1934 | 1–1 OT | @ Detroit Red Wings (1933–34) | 8–11–7 |
| 27 | T | January 21, 1934 | 2–2 OT | @ Chicago Black Hawks (1933–34) | 8–11–8 |
| 28 | L | January 23, 1934 | 4–8 | @ Toronto Maple Leafs (1933–34) | 8–12–8 |
| 29 | W | January 25, 1934 | 6–0 | Toronto Maple Leafs (1933–34) | 9–12–8 |
| 30 | W | January 27, 1934 | 2–1 OT | New York Americans (1933–34) | 10–12–8 |
| 31 | L | January 30, 1934 | 2–3 | @ New York Americans (1933–34) | 10–13–8 |

February

| Game | Result | Date | Score | Opponent | Record |
|---|---|---|---|---|---|
| 32 | W | February 1, 1934 | 3–1 | @ Ottawa Senators (1933–34) | 11–13–8 |
| 33 | L | February 3, 1934 | 2–4 | New York Rangers (1933–34) | 11–14–8 |
| 34 | W | February 6, 1934 | 6–2 | Ottawa Senators (1933–34) | 12–14–8 |
| 35 | W | February 8, 1934 | 3–2 OT | @ Montreal Canadiens (1933–34) | 13–14–8 |
| 36 | W | February 10, 1934 | 1–0 | Boston Bruins (1933–34) | 14–14–8 |
| 37 | L | February 13, 1934 | 1–6 | Detroit Red Wings (1933–34) | 14–15–8 |
| 38 | T | February 15, 1934 | 4–4 OT | @ Boston Bruins (1933–34) | 14–15–9 |
| 39 | L | February 17, 1934 | 2–4 | New York Americans (1933–34) | 14–16–9 |
| 40 | W | February 20, 1934 | 6–2 | @ Ottawa Senators (1933–34) | 15–16–9 |
| 41 | W | February 22, 1934 | 1–0 | @ Montreal Canadiens (1933–34) | 16–16–9 |
| 42 | L | February 27, 1934 | 1–2 OT | Toronto Maple Leafs (1933–34) | 16–17–9 |

March

| Game | Result | Date | Score | Opponent | Record |
|---|---|---|---|---|---|
| 43 | W | March 1, 1934 | 4–1 | @ Detroit Red Wings (1933–34) | 17–17–9 |
| 44 | L | March 4, 1934 | 2–4 | @ Chicago Black Hawks (1933–34) | 17–18–9 |
| 45 | T | March 8, 1934 | 2–2 OT | New York Rangers (1933–34) | 17–18–10 |
| 46 | W | March 11, 1934 | 7–3 OT | @ New York Rangers (1933–34) | 18–18–10 |
| 47 | W | March 13, 1934 | 6–2 | Chicago Black Hawks (1933–34) | 19–18–10 |
| 48 | T | March 17, 1934 | 2–2 OT | Ottawa Senators (1933–34) | 19–18–11 |

Legend: Win (2 points) Loss (0 points) Tie (1 point)

== Playoffs ==
They went against the Rangers and won 2 goals to 1 or 2–1. They went against Chicago in the next round and lost 6 goals to 2, or 2–6.

== Player statistics ==
=== Regular season ===
Scoring

| Player | Pos | GP | G | A | Pts | PIM |
|---|---|---|---|---|---|---|
| Hooley Smith | C/RW | 47 | 18 | 19 | 37 | 58 |
| Baldy Northcott | D/LW | 47 | 20 | 13 | 33 | 27 |
| Earl Robinson | RW/C | 47 | 12 | 16 | 28 | 14 |
| Dave Trottier | LW | 48 | 9 | 17 | 26 | 47 |
| Russ Blinco | C | 31 | 14 | 9 | 23 | 2 |
| Jimmy Ward | RW | 48 | 14 | 9 | 23 | 46 |
| Paul Haynes | C | 44 | 5 | 4 | 9 | 18 |
| Glenn Brydson | RW | 37 | 4 | 5 | 9 | 19 |
| Herb Cain | LW | 30 | 4 | 5 | 9 | 14 |
| Bill MacKenzie | D | 47 | 4 | 3 | 7 | 20 |
| Cy Wentworth | D | 48 | 2 | 5 | 7 | 31 |
| Stewart Evans | D | 27 | 4 | 2 | 6 | 35 |
| Wally Kilrea | RW/C | 45 | 3 | 1 | 4 | 7 |
| Irv Frew | D | 30 | 2 | 1 | 3 | 41 |
| Ted Graham | D | 19 | 2 | 1 | 3 | 10 |
| Lorne Duguid | LW | 5 | 0 | 1 | 1 | 0 |
| Vern Ayres | D | 17 | 0 | 0 | 0 | 19 |
| Dave Kerr | G | 48 | 0 | 0 | 0 | 0 |
| Stan McCabe | LW | 8 | 0 | 0 | 0 | 4 |
| Paul Runge | C/LW | 4 | 0 | 0 | 0 | 0 |
| Archie Wilcox | RW/D | 10 | 0 | 0 | 0 | 2 |

Goaltending

| Player | MIN | GP | W | L | T | GA | GAA | SO |
|---|---|---|---|---|---|---|---|---|
| Dave Kerr | 3060 | 48 | 19 | 18 | 11 | 122 | 2.39 | 6 |
| Team: | 3060 | 48 | 19 | 18 | 11 | 122 | 2.39 | 6 |

=== Playoffs ===
Scoring

| Player | Pos | GP | G | A | Pts | PIM |
|---|---|---|---|---|---|---|
| Baldy Northcott | D/LW | 4 | 2 | 0 | 2 | 0 |
| Earl Robinson | RW/C | 4 | 2 | 0 | 2 | 0 |
| Cy Wentworth | D | 4 | 0 | 2 | 2 | 2 |
| Russ Blinco | C | 4 | 0 | 1 | 1 | 0 |
| Paul Haynes | C | 4 | 0 | 1 | 1 | 2 |
| Hooley Smith | C/RW | 4 | 0 | 1 | 1 | 6 |
| Glenn Brydson | RW | 1 | 0 | 0 | 0 | 0 |
| Herb Cain | LW | 4 | 0 | 0 | 0 | 0 |
| Stewart Evans | D | 4 | 0 | 0 | 0 | 4 |
| Irv Frew | D | 4 | 0 | 0 | 0 | 6 |
| Dave Kerr | G | 4 | 0 | 0 | 0 | 0 |
| Wally Kilrea | RW/C | 4 | 0 | 0 | 0 | 0 |
| Bill MacKenzie | D | 4 | 0 | 0 | 0 | 0 |
| Harold Starr | D | 3 | 0 | 0 | 0 | 0 |
| Dave Trottier | LW | 4 | 0 | 0 | 0 | 6 |
| Jimmy Ward | RW | 4 | 0 | 0 | 0 | 0 |

Goaltending

| Player | MIN | GP | W | L | GA | GAA | SO |
|---|---|---|---|---|---|---|---|
| Dave Kerr | 240 | 4 | 1 | 2 | 7 | 1.75 | 1 |
| Team: | 240 | 4 | 1 | 2 | 7 | 1.75 | 1 |

Note: GP = Games played; G = Goals; A = Assists; Pts = Points; +/- = Plus/minus; PIM = Penalty minutes; PPG = Power-play goals; SHG = Short-handed goals; GWG = Game-winning goals
MIN = Minutes played; W = Wins; L = Losses; T = Ties; GA = Goals against; GAA = Goals against average; SO = Shutouts;

== See also ==
- 1933–34 NHL season
