= List of Stanley Cup Final overtime series winners =

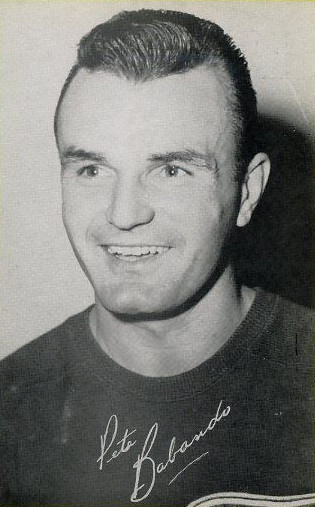
Pete Babando scored the Cup winning goal in double overtime of game 7 in 1950

In ice hockey, the Stanley Cup Final is the championship series of the National Hockey League (NHL) to determine the winner of the Stanley Cup. The series is played in a best of seven format, meaning that a team must win four games in order to win the series and the Cup. Games that are tied at the end of regulation time go to overtime. In the history of the NHL, there have been 17 series which have ended on a game-winning goal in overtime.

The first overtime Cup winning goal was scored by Bill Cook of the New York Rangers in game four of the 1933 final against goaltender Lorne Chabot and the Toronto Maple Leafs. Mush March of the Chicago Black Hawks repeated the feat in 1934 against Wilf Cude and the Detroit Red Wings, also in game four. The 1933 and 1934 series were played in a best of five format; the current best of seven format was adopted beginning in 1939.

Pete Babando in 1950 and Tony Leswick in 1954, both with the Red Wings, scored the only game seven Cup winning goals. Babando scored against Chuck Rayner and the Rangers while Leswick scored against Gerry McNeil and the Montreal Canadiens. The goal in 1954 was the second overtime Cup winner allowed by McNeil, the only goaltender to have allowed more than one, the first having been scored in 1951 by Bill Barilko of the Maple Leafs.

Twice in Stanley Cup history has a team won the Cup on an overtime series winner one season, and then lost the same way the next season. The Canadiens won the 1953 series in overtime, only to lose it the following year to Detroit. The Dallas Stars won the 1999 Stanley Cup vs the Buffalo Sabres, only to lose it the following year to the New Jersey Devils.

== Overtime series winners ==
Stanley Cup winning goals scored in overtime
Name	Team	Year	Game No.	Time	Opposing goalie	Opposing team	Score
Bill Cook	New York Rangers	1933	4	07:33	Lorne Chabot	Toronto Maple Leafs	1–0
Mush March	Chicago Blackhawks	1934	4	30:05	Wilf Cude	Detroit Red Wings	1–0
Bryan Hextall	New York Rangers	1940	6	02:07	Turk Broda	Toronto Maple Leafs	3–2
Toe Blake	Montreal Canadiens	1944	4	09:12	Mike Karakas	Chicago Black Hawks	5–4
Pete Babando	Detroit Red Wings	1950	7	28:31	Chuck Rayner	New York Rangers	4–3
Bill Barilko	Toronto Maple Leafs	1951	5	02:53	Gerry McNeil	Montreal Canadiens	3–2
Elmer Lach	Montreal Canadiens	1953	5	01:22	Gord Henry	Boston Bruins	1–0
Tony Leswick	Detroit Red Wings	1954	7	04:29	Gerry McNeil	Montreal Canadiens	2–1
Henri Richard	Montreal Canadiens	1966	6	02:20	Roger Crozier	Detroit Red Wings	3–2
Bobby Orr	Boston Bruins	1970	4	00:40	Glenn Hall	St. Louis Blues	4–3
Jacques Lemaire	Montreal Canadiens	1977	4	04:32	Gerry Cheevers	Boston Bruins	2–1
Bob Nystrom	New York Islanders	1980	6	07:11	Pete Peeters	Philadelphia Flyers	5–4
Uwe Krupp	Colorado Avalanche	1996	4	44:31	John Vanbiesbrouck	Florida Panthers	1–0
Brett Hull	Dallas Stars	1999	6	54:51	Dominik Hašek	Buffalo Sabres	2–1
Jason Arnott	New Jersey Devils	2000	6	28:20	Ed Belfour	Dallas Stars	2–1
Patrick Kane	Chicago Blackhawks	2010	6	04:06	Michael Leighton	Philadelphia Flyers	4–3
Alec Martinez	Los Angeles Kings	2014	5	34:43	Henrik Lundqvist	New York Rangers	3–2
