= 1933–34 Boston Bruins season =

NHL team season

1933–34 Boston Bruins
- Division: 4th American
- 1933–34 record: 18–25–5
- Home record: 11–11–2
- Road record: 7–14–3
- Goals for: 111
- Goals against: 130

Team information
- General manager: Art Ross
- Coach: Art Ross
- Captain: Marty Barry
- Arena: Boston Garden

Team leaders
- Goals: Marty Barry (27)
- Assists: Nels Stewart (17)
- Points: Marty Barry (39); Nels Stewart (39)
- Penalty minutes: Nels Stewart (68)
- Wins: Tiny Thompson (18)
- Goals against average: Tiny Thompson (2.62)

The 1933–34 Boston Bruins season was the Bruins' tenth season in the NHL. The team placed last in the American Division and missed the playoffs for the first time since the 1931–32 season and for the second time since the 1925–26 season.

== Regular season ==
=== Final standings ===
American Division
	GP	W	L	T	GF	GA	PTS
**Detroit Red Wings**	48	24	14	10	113	98	58
**Chicago Black Hawks**	48	20	17	11	88	83	51
**New York Rangers**	48	21	19	8	120	113	50
Boston Bruins	48	18	25	5	111	130	41

Note: GP = Games Played, W = Wins, L = Losses, T = Ties, Pts = Points, GF = Goals For, GA = Goals Against
Teams that qualified for the playoffs are highlighted in bold.

=== Record vs. opponents ===
==== Vs. American Division ====
1933–34 NHL records
Team	BOS	CHI	DET	NYR	Total
Boston	—	3–2–1	1–4–1	2–3–1	**6–9–3**
Chicago	2–3–1	—	1–4–1	2–3–1	**5–10–3**
Detroit	4–1–1	4–1–1	—	3–3	**11–5–2**
N.Y. Rangers	3–2–1	3–2–1	3–3	—	**9–7–2**

==== Vs. Canadian Division ====
1933–34 NHL records
Team	MTL	MTM	NYA	OTT	TOR	Total
Boston	5–1	1–4–1	3–3	2–4	1–4–1	**12–16–2**
Chicago	3–2–1	2–2–2	3–1–2	4–0–2	3–2–1	**15–7–8**
Detroit	2–3–1	2–1–3	3–0–3	4–2	2–3–1	**13–9–8**
N.Y. Rangers	3–2–1	3–2–1	2–4	4–1–1	0–3–3	**12–12–6**

== Schedule and results ==
1933–34 regular season
November

Game	Result	Date	Score	Opponent	Record
1	L	November 9, 1933	1–6	@ Toronto Maple Leafs (1933–34)	0–1–0
2	L	November 11, 1933	2–3	@ Montreal Maroons (1933–34)	0–2–0
3	L	November 14, 1933	2–4	Detroit Red Wings (1933–34)	0–3–0
4	W	November 18, 1933	2–1	@ Montreal Canadiens (1933–34)	1–3–0
5	W	November 21, 1933	2–0	Chicago Black Hawks (1933–34)	2–3–0
6	W	November 23, 1933	6–0	@ Detroit Red Wings (1933–34)	3–3–0
7	L	November 26, 1933	0–1	@ Chicago Black Hawks (1933–34)	3–4–0
8	W	November 28, 1933	2–1	Ottawa Senators (1933–34)	4–4–0
9	L	November 30, 1933	1–2	@ Ottawa Senators (1933–34)	4–5–0

December

Game	Result	Date	Score	Opponent	Record
10	L	December 2, 1933	0–3	New York Rangers (1933–34)	4–6–0
11	W	December 5, 1933	5–2	Montreal Canadiens (1933–34)	5–6–0
12	W	December 9, 1933	4–2	New York Americans (1933–34)	6–6–0
13	L	December 12, 1933	1–4	Toronto Maple Leafs (1933–34)	6–7–0
14	W	December 14, 1933	5–4 OT	@ New York Americans (1933–34)	7–7–0
15	T	December 17, 1933	2–2 OT	@ New York Rangers (1933–34)	7–7–1
16	W	December 19, 1933	1–0 OT	Montreal Maroons (1933–34)	8–7–1
17	L	December 23, 1933	1–3	Chicago Black Hawks (1933–34)	8–8–1
18	T	December 26, 1933	2–2 OT	Toronto Maple Leafs (1933–34)	8–8–2
19	W	December 28, 1933	4–3	@ Montreal Canadiens (1933–34)	9–8–2

January

Game	Result	Date	Score	Opponent	Record
20	L	January 2, 1934	0–1	Montreal Maroons (1933–34)	9–9–2
21	L	January 4, 1934	2–9	@ Ottawa Senators (1933–34)	9–10–2
22	L	January 6, 1934	2–4	@ Montreal Maroons (1933–34)	9–11–2
23	L	January 9, 1934	1–2	New York Americans (1933–34)	9–12–2
24	T	January 11, 1934	0–0 OT	@ Chicago Black Hawks (1933–34)	9–12–3
25	L	January 14, 1934	0–2	@ Detroit Red Wings (1933–34)	9–13–3
26	W	January 16, 1934	4–0	Montreal Canadiens (1933–34)	10–13–3
27	L	January 18, 1934	2–6	@ Toronto Maple Leafs (1933–34)	10–14–3
28	L	January 21, 1934	2–4	@ New York Americans (1933–34)	10–15–3
29	L	January 23, 1934	1–3	Detroit Red Wings (1933–34)	10–16–3
30	L	January 28, 1934	2–4	@ New York Rangers (1933–34)	10–17–3
31	W	January 30, 1934	2–1	New York Rangers (1933–34)	11–17–3

February

Game	Result	Date	Score	Opponent	Record
32	T	February 1, 1934	2–2 OT	@ Detroit Red Wings (1933–34)	11–17–4
33	W	February 4, 1934	2–1 OT	@ Chicago Black Hawks (1933–34)	12–17–4
34	L	February 6, 1934	0–1	New York Americans (1933–34)	12–18–4
35	L	February 10, 1934	0–1	@ Montreal Maroons (1933–34)	12–19–4
36	L	February 13, 1934	4–6	New York Rangers (1933–34)	12–20–4
37	T	February 15, 1934	4–4 OT	Montreal Maroons (1933–34)	12–20–5
38	L	February 17, 1934	4–6	@ Toronto Maple Leafs (1933–34)	12–21–5
39	L	February 20, 1934	1–4	Detroit Red Wings (1933–34)	12–22–5
40	L	February 22, 1934	1–3 OT	Ottawa Senators (1933–34)	12–23–5
41	L	February 24, 1934	4–9	@ Ottawa Senators (1933–34)	12–24–5
42	W	February 27, 1934	3–1	Chicago Black Hawks (1933–34)	13–24–5

March

Game	Result	Date	Score	Opponent	Record
43	W	March 1, 1934	3–1	Montreal Canadiens (1933–34)	14–24–5
44	L	March 3, 1934	1–2	@ Montreal Canadiens (1933–34)	14–25–5
45	W	March 6, 1934	7–2	Toronto Maple Leafs (1933–34)	15–25–5
46	W	March 13, 1934	2–1	Ottawa Senators (1933–34)	16–25–5
47	W	March 15, 1934	3–2	@ New York Rangers (1933–34)	17–25–5
48	W	March 18, 1934	9–5	@ New York Americans (1933–34)	18–25–5

Legend: Win (2 points) Loss (0 points) Tie (1 point)

== Player statistics ==
=== Regular season ===
Scoring

Player	Pos	GP	G	A	Pts	PIM
Marty Barry	C	48	27	12	39	12
Nels Stewart	C	48	22	17	39	68
Joe Lamb	RW	48	10	15	25	47
Dit Clapper	RW/D	48	10	12	22	6
Red Beattie	LW	48	9	13	22	26
Harry Oliver	RW	48	5	9	14	6
Eddie Shore	D	30	2	10	12	57
Babe Siebert	LW/D	32	5	6	11	31
Alex Smith	D	45	4	6	10	32
Bob Gracie	C/LW	24	2	6	8	8
Art Chapman	C	21	2	5	7	7
Jim O'Neil	C/RW	23	2	2	4	15
Don Smillie	LW	12	2	2	4	4
Myles Lane	D	25	2	1	3	17
Vic Ripley	LW	14	2	1	3	6
Percy Galbraith	LW/D	42	0	2	2	6
Lloyd Gross	LW	6	1	0	1	6
Lionel Hitchman	D	27	1	0	1	4
George Patterson	W	10	0	1	1	2
Archie Wilcox	RW/D	14	0	1	1	2
Bob Davie	D	9	0	0	0	6
Tommy Filmore	RW	3	0	0	0	0
Walter Harnott	LW	6	0	0	0	2
Frank Jerwa	LW/D	5	0	0	0	2
Joe Jerwa	D	2	0	0	0	2
Bert McInenly	LW/D	7	0	0	0	4
Johnny Sheppard	LW	4	0	0	0	0
Tiny Thompson	G	48	0	0	0	0

Goaltending

Player	MIN	GP	W	L	T	GA	GAA	SO
Tiny Thompson	2980	48	18	25	5	130	2.62	5
Team:	2980	48	18	25	5	130	2.62	5

Note:

Pos = Position;GP = Games played; G = Goals; A = Assists; Pts = Points; PIM = Penalty minutes; +/- = Plus/minus; PPG = Power-play goals; SHG = Short-handed goals; GWG = Game-winning goals
Pos = Position;GP = Games played; Min, TOI = Minutes played; W = Wins; L = Losses; T,T/OT = Ties; OTL = Overtime losses; GA = Goals-against; GAA = Goals-against average; SO = Shutouts; SA = Shots against; SV = Shots saved;SV% = Save percentage;

== See also ==
- 1933–34 NHL season
