= Mush March =

Canadian ice hockey player

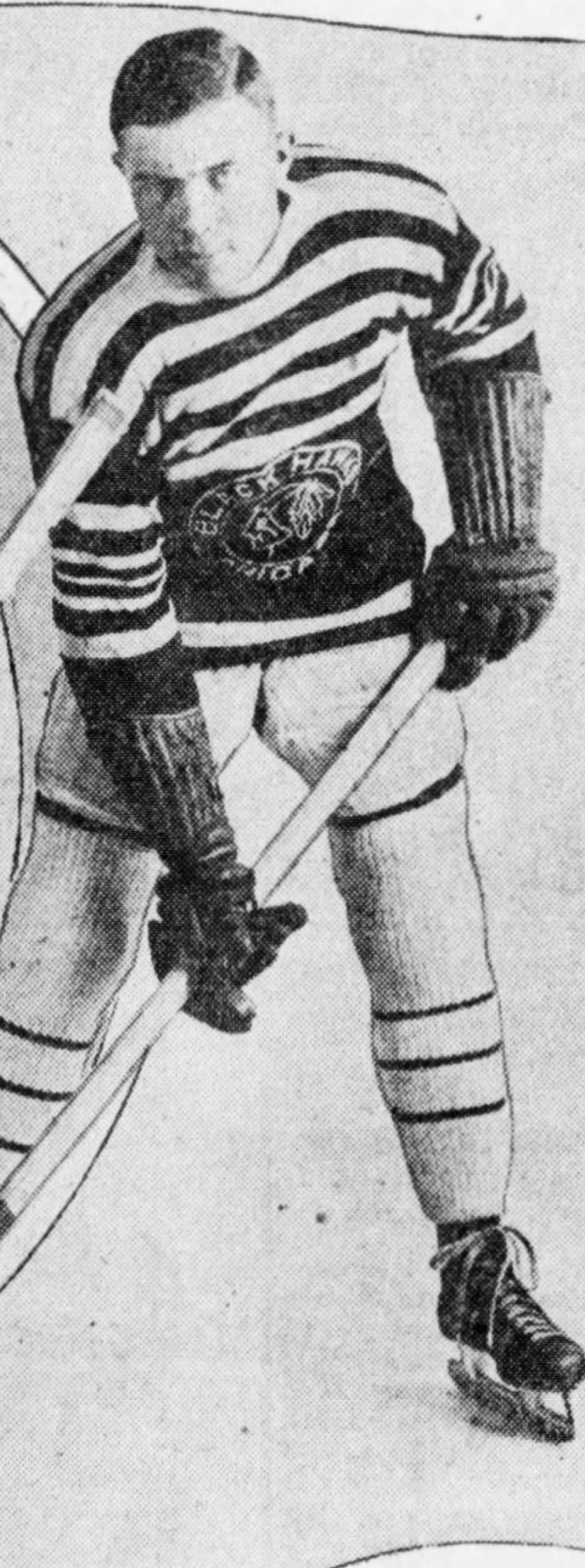
- Born: October 18, 1908 Silton, Saskatchewan, Canada
- Died: January 9, 2002 (aged 93) Paxton, Illinois, United States
- Height: 5 ft 5 in (165 cm)
- Weight: 154 lb (70 kg; 11 st 0 lb)
- Position: Right wing
- Shot: Right
- Played for: Chicago Black Hawks
- Playing career: 1928–1945

Harold Clarence "Mush" March (October 18, 1908 – January 9, 2002) was a Canadian ice hockey player in the National Hockey League. He is best remembered for scoring the game-winning goal in the second overtime of game four of the 1934 Stanley Cup Final to lift the Chicago Black Hawks to a 3–1 series triumph.

== Playing career ==
March was a right winger who played for seventeen seasons, all with the Chicago Black Hawks, from 1928–29 to 1944–45. During that span, he played 759 games, scoring 153 goals and 230 assists, for 383 points. Since the Black Hawks were not an overly successful team during most of those 17 years, March only played in a total of 45 playoff games, but he made the most of those 45 games by scoring 12 goals, 15 assists for 27 points. He also scored the first-ever goal at Maple Leaf Gardens in 1931. He kept the puck and dropped it at the Gardens final game in 1999.

== Awards and achievements ==
- 1934 Stanley Cup champion (Chicago)
- 1938 Stanley Cup champion (Chicago)
- Scored the first goal in the long history of Maple Leaf Gardens on November 12, 1931. On February 13, 1999, as part of the final game played at the Gardens (also between the Maple Leafs and Blackhawks), he officiated at the ceremonial opening faceoff - with the very same puck that he had used to score that first goal almost 68 years before.
- He became the second recorded player in hockey history to win the Stanley Cup for his team on an overtime goal.
- He was the last surviving member of Black Hawks 1934 Stanley Cup team.

== Career statistics ==
			Regular season					Playoffs
Season	Team	League	GP	G	A	Pts	PIM	GP	G	A	Pts	PIM
1925–26	Regina Falcons	S-SJHL	8	10	7	17	2	—	—	—	—	—
1925–26	Regina Falcons	M-Cup	—	—	—	—	—	3	3	2	5	4
1926–27	Regina Falcons	S-SJHL	5	7	0	7	4	1	0	0	0	0
1927–28	Regina Monarchs	S-SJHL	5	13	5	18	17	2	4	0	4	2
1927–28	Regina Monarchs	M-Cup	—	—	—	—	—	11	36	4	40	8
1928–29	Chicago Black Hawks	NHL	35	3	3	6	6	—	—	—	—	—
1929–30	Chicago Black Hawks	NHL	43	8	7	15	48	—	—	—	—	—
1930–31	Chicago Black Hawks	NHL	44	11	6	17	36	9	3	1	4	11
1931–32	Chicago Black Hawks	NHL	48	12	10	22	59	2	0	0	0	2
1932–33	Chicago Black Hawks	NHL	48	9	11	20	38	—	—	—	—	—
1933–34	Chicago Black Hawks	NHL	48	4	13	17	26	8	2	2	4	6
1934–35	Chicago Black Hawks	NHL	48	13	17	30	48	2	0	0	0	0
1935–36	Chicago Black Hawks	NHL	48	16	19	35	42	2	2	3	5	0
1936–37	Chicago Black Hawks	NHL	37	11	6	17	31	—	—	—	—	—
1937–38	Chicago Black Hawks	NHL	41	11	17	28	16	9	2	4	6	12
1938–39	Chicago Black Hawks	NHL	46	10	11	21	29	—	—	—	—	—
1939–40	Chicago Black Hawks	NHL	45	9	14	23	49	2	1	0	1	2
1940–41	Chicago Black Hawks	NHL	44	8	9	17	16	4	2	3	5	0
1941–42	Chicago Black Hawks	NHL	48	6	26	32	22	3	0	2	2	4
1942–43	Chicago Black Hawks	NHL	50	7	29	36	46	—	—	—	—	—
1943–44	Chicago Black Hawks	NHL	48	10	27	37	16	4	0	0	0	4
1944–45	Chicago Black Hawks	NHL	38	5	5	10	12	—	—	—	—	—
NHL totals			759	153	230	383	540	45	12	15	27	41
