= 1933–34 Detroit Red Wings season =

Sports season

1933–34 Detroit Red Wings
- Division: 1st American
- 1933–34 record: 24–14–10
- Home record: 15–5–4
- Road record: 9–9–6
- Goals for: 113
- Goals against: 98

Team information
- General manager: Jack Adams
- Coach: Jack Adams
- Captain: Herbie Lewis
- Arena: Detroit Olympia

Team leaders
- Goals: John Sorrell (21)
- Assists: Larry Aurie (19)
- Points: Larry Aurie (35)
- Penalty minutes: Hap Emms (51)
- Wins: Wilf Cude (15)
- Goals against average: Wilf Cude (1.52)

The 1933–34 Detroit Red Wings season was the eighth season for the Detroit NHL franchise, second as the Red Wings. The Red Wings finished first in the American Division to qualify for the playoffs.

== Regular season ==
=== Final standings ===
American Division
	GP	W	L	T	GF	GA	PTS
**Detroit Red Wings**	48	24	14	10	113	98	58
**Chicago Black Hawks**	48	20	17	11	88	83	51
**New York Rangers**	48	21	19	8	120	113	50
Boston Bruins	48	18	25	5	111	130	41

Note: GP = Games Played, W = Wins, L = Losses, T = Ties, Pts = Points, GF = Goals For, GA = Goals Against
Teams that qualified for the playoffs are highlighted in bold.

=== Record vs. opponents ===
==== Vs. American Division ====
1933–34 NHL records
Team	**BOS**	**CHI**	**DET**	**NYR**	**Total**
Boston	—	3–2–1	1–4–1	2–3–1	**6–9–3**
Chicago	2–3–1	—	1–4–1	2–3–1	**5–10–3**
Detroit	4–1–1	4–1–1	—	3–3	**11–5–2**
N.Y. Rangers	3–2–1	3–2–1	3–3	—	**9–7–2**

==== Vs. Canadian Division ====
1933–34 NHL records
Team	**MTL**	**MTM**	**NYA**	**OTT**	**TOR**	**Total**
Boston	5–1	1–4–1	3–3	2–4	1–4–1	**12–16–2**
Chicago	3–2–1	2–2–2	3–1–2	4–0–2	3–2–1	**15–7–8**
Detroit	2–3–1	2–1–3	3–0–3	4–2	2–3–1	**13–9–8**
N.Y. Rangers	3–2–1	3–2–1	2–4	4–1–1	0–3–3	**12–12–6**

== Schedule and results ==
1933–34 regular season
November

Game	Result	Date	Score	Opponent	Record
1	L	November 9, 1933	1–2	@ Montreal Canadiens (1933–34)	0–1–0
2	W	November 12, 1933	5–2	New York Americans (1933–34)	1–1–0
3	W	November 14, 1933	4–2	@ Boston Bruins (1933–34)	2–1–0
4	L	November 16, 1933	1–2	@ New York Rangers (1933–34)	2–2–0
5	W	November 19, 1933	4–1	New York Rangers (1933–34)	3–2–0
6	W	November 21, 1933	3–2	@ Ottawa Senators (1933–34)	4–2–0
7	L	November 23, 1933	0–6	Boston Bruins (1933–34)	4–3–0
8	W	November 26, 1933	4–2	Montreal Canadiens (1933–34)	5–3–0
9	W	November 30, 1933	2–1	Chicago Black Hawks (1933–34)	6–3–0

December

Game	Result	Date	Score	Opponent	Record
10	L	December 3, 1933	0–3	Toronto Maple Leafs (1933–34)	6–4–0
11	T	December 5, 1933	1–1 OT	@ Montreal Maroons (1933–34)	6–4–1
12	W	December 10, 1933	3–1	Montreal Maroons (1933–34)	7–4–1
13	W	December 12, 1933	4–1	Chicago Black Hawks (1933–34)	8–4–1
14	L	December 14, 1933	0–4	@ Chicago Black Hawks (1933–34)	8–5–1
15	T	December 17, 1933	4–4 OT	New York Americans (1933–34)	8–5–2
16	W	December 19, 1933	1–0	@ New York Americans (1933–34)	9–5–2
17	L	December 23, 1933	0–3	@ Montreal Canadiens (1933–34)	9–6–2
18	L	December 25, 1933	3–6	Ottawa Senators (1933–34)	9–7–2
19	L	December 30, 1933	1–8	@ Toronto Maple Leafs (1933–34)	9–8–2

January

Game	Result	Date	Score	Opponent	Record
20	W	January 4, 1934	3–1	New York Rangers (1933–34)	10–8–2
21	W	January 7, 1934	2–0	Ottawa Senators (1933–34)	11–8–2
22	L	January 9, 1934	1–2	@ New York Rangers (1933–34)	11–9–2
23	T	January 11, 1934	1–1 OT	@ Montreal Maroons (1933–34)	11–9–3
24	W	January 14, 1934	2–0	Boston Bruins (1933–34)	12–9–3
25	T	January 18, 1934	1–1 OT	Montreal Maroons (1933–34)	12–9–4
26	L	January 20, 1934	4–5	@ Ottawa Senators (1933–34)	12–10–4
27	W	January 21, 1934	4–2 OT	Toronto Maple Leafs (1933–34)	13–10–4
28	W	January 23, 1934	3–1	@ Boston Bruins (1933–34)	14–10–4
29	T	January 25, 1934	1–1 OT	@ New York Americans (1933–34)	14–10–5
30	T	January 27, 1934	2–2 OT	@ Toronto Maple Leafs (1933–34)	14–10–6
31	T	January 28, 1934	3–3 OT	Montreal Canadiens (1933–34)	14–10–7

February

Game	Result	Date	Score	Opponent	Record
32	T	February 1, 1934	2–2 OT	Boston Bruins (1933–34)	14–10–8
33	W	February 4, 1934	2–1	Toronto Maple Leafs (1933–34)	15–10–8
34	T	February 8, 1934	1–1 OT	@ Chicago Black Hawks (1933–34)	15–10–9
35	W	February 10, 1934	3–0	@ Ottawa Senators (1933–34)	16–10–9
36	W	February 13, 1934	6–1	@ Montreal Maroons (1933–34)	17–10–9
37	T	February 15, 1934	1–1 OT	@ New York Americans (1933–34)	17–10–10
38	W	February 18, 1934	2–1 OT	Ottawa Senators (1933–34)	18–10–10
39	W	February 20, 1934	4–1	@ Boston Bruins (1933–34)	19–10–10
40	L	February 22, 1934	1–3	@ New York Rangers (1933–34)	19–11–10
41	W	February 25, 1934	2–1 OT	New York Americans (1933–34)	20–11–10
42	W	February 27, 1934	5–1	New York Rangers (1933–34)	21–11–10

March

Game	Result	Date	Score	Opponent	Record
43	L	March 1, 1934	1–4	Montreal Maroons (1933–34)	21–12–10
44	L	March 3, 1934	4–6	@ Toronto Maple Leafs (1933–34)	21–13–10
45	W	March 8, 1934	3–0	@ Chicago Black Hawks (1933–34)	22–13–10
46	W	March 11, 1934	3–2 OT	Chicago Black Hawks (1933–34)	23–13–10
47	W	March 15, 1934	4–1	@ Montreal Canadiens (1933–34)	24–13–10
48	L	March 18, 1934	1–2	Montreal Canadiens (1933–34)	24–14–10

Legend: Win (2 points) Loss (0 points) Tie (1 point)

== Playoffs ==
=== (C1) Toronto Maple Leafs vs. (A1) Detroit Red Wings ===
Detroit Red Wings vs Toronto Maple Leafs
Date	Visitors	Score	Home	Score
Mar 22	Detroit	2	Toronto	1 (OT)
Mar 24	Detroit	6	Toronto	3
Mar 26	Toronto	3	Detroit	1
Mar 28	Toronto	5	Detroit	1
Mar 30	Toronto	0	Detroit	1

Detroit wins best-of-five series 3–2.

=== (A1) Detroit Red Wings vs. (A2) Chicago Black Hawks ===
Chicago Black Hawks vs Detroit Red Wings
Date	Visitors	Score	Home	Score
Apr 3	Chicago	2	Detroit	1 (2OT)
Apr 5	Chicago	4	Detroit	1
Apr 8	Detroit	5	Chicago	2
Apr 10	Detroit	0	Chicago	1 (2OT)

Chicago wins the Stanley Cup 3–1.

== Player statistics ==
=== Regular season ===
Scoring

Player	Pos	GP	G	A	Pts	PIM
Larry Aurie	RW	48	16	19	35	36
John Sorrell	LW	47	21	10	31	8
Herbie Lewis	LW	43	16	15	31	15
Cooney Weiland	C	39	11	19	30	6
Ebbie Goodfellow	C/D	48	13	13	26	45
Frank Carson	RW	47	10	9	19	36
Gord Pettinger	C	48	3	14	17	14
Hap Emms	LW/D	45	7	7	14	51
Eddie Wiseman	RW	48	5	9	14	13
Doug Young	D	47	4	0	4	36
Wilf Starr	C	28	2	2	4	17
Walt Buswell	D	47	1	2	3	8
Lloyd Gross	LW	13	1	1	2	2
Carl Voss	C	8	0	2	2	2
Ted Graham	D	28	1	0	1	29
Gus Marker	RW	7	1	0	1	2
Fred Robertson	D	24	1	0	1	12
Burr Williams	D	1	0	1	1	12
Abbie Cox	G	2	0	0	0	0
Wilf Cude	G	29	0	0	0	0
Stewart Evans	D	17	0	0	0	20
Yip Foster	D	6	0	0	0	2
John Gallagher	D	1	0	0	0	0
George Hay	LW	1	0	0	0	0
Ron Moffat	LW	5	0	0	0	2
John Ross Roach	G	19	0	0	0	0

Goaltending

Player	MIN	GP	W	L	T	GA	GAA	SO
Wilf Cude	1860	29	15	6	8	47	1.52	4
John Ross Roach	1030	19	9	8	1	45	2.62	1
Abbie Cox	109	2	0	0	1	5	2.75	0
Doug Young	21	1	0	0	0	1	2.86	0
Team:	3020	48	24	14	10	98	1.95	5

=== Playoffs ===
Scoring

Player	Pos	GP	G	A	Pts	PIM
Larry Aurie	RW	9	3	7	10	2
Herbie Lewis	LW	9	5	2	7	2
Ebbie Goodfellow	C/D	9	4	3	7	12
Ted Graham	D	9	3	1	4	8
Cooney Weiland	C	9	2	2	4	4
John Sorrell	LW	8	0	2	2	0
Wilf Starr	C	7	0	2	2	2
Gord Pettinger	C	7	1	0	1	2
Walt Buswell	D	9	0	1	1	2
Frank Carson	RW	6	0	1	1	5
Eddie Wiseman	RW	7	0	1	1	4
Gene Carrigan	C	4	0	0	0	0
Wilf Cude	G	9	0	0	0	0
Hap Emms	LW/D	8	0	0	0	2
Lloyd Gross	LW	1	0	0	0	0
Gus Marker	RW	4	0	0	0	2
Ron Moffat	LW	3	0	0	0	0
Burr Williams	D	7	0	0	0	8
Doug Young	D	9	0	0	0	10

Goaltending

Player	MIN	GP	W	L	GA	GAA	SO
Wilf Cude	593	9	4	5	21	2.12	1
Team:	593	9	4	5	21	2.12	1

Note: GP = Games played; G = Goals; A = Assists; Pts = Points; +/- = Plus-minus PIM = Penalty minutes; PPG = Power-play goals; SHG = Short-handed goals; GWG = Game-winning goals;
MIN = Minutes played; W = Wins; L = Losses; T = Ties; GA = Goals against; GAA = Goals-against average; SO = Shutouts;

== See also ==
- 1933–34 NHL season
