= Elwin Romnes =

American ice hockey player and coach

- Born: January 1, 1907 White Bear Lake, Minnesota, U.S.
- Died: July 21, 1984 (aged 77) Colorado Springs, Colorado, U.S.
- Height: 5 ft 11 in (180 cm)
- Weight: 156 lb (71 kg; 11 st 2 lb)
- Position: Center
- Shot: Left
- Played for: Chicago Black Hawks; Toronto Maple Leafs; New York Americans
- Playing career: 1927–1940 Coaching career

Biographical details
- Education: University of St. Thomas

Coaching career (HC unless noted)
- 1941–1945: Michigan Tech
- 1947–1952: Minnesota

Head coaching record
- Overall: 56–74–3

Elwin Nelson "Doc" Romnes (January 1, 1907 – July 21, 1984) was an American ice hockey player and coach. He played professionally in the National Hockey League (NHL) with the Chicago Black Hawks, Toronto Maple Leafs, and New York Americans from 1930 to 1940. He won the Lady Byng Trophy in 1935–36 for sportsmanship and gentlemanly play, and with Chicago won the Stanley Cup twice, in 1934 and 1938.

Following his player career, Romnes was head coach of the Michigan Tech Huskies from 1941 to 1945 (including two years when the program was suspended during World War II), and the Minnesota Golden Gophers from 1947 until 1952. He was inducted into the United States Hockey Hall of Fame in 1973.

== Career statistics ==
			Regular season					Playoffs
Season	Team	League	GP	G	A	Pts	PIM	GP	G	A	Pts	PIM
1925–26	St. Thomas	Independent	—	—	—	—	—	—	—	—	—	—
1927–28	St. Paul Saints	AHA	40	2	3	5	16	—	—	—	—	—
1928–29	St. Paul Saints	AHA	39	7	3	10	22	8	2	0	2	6
1929–30	St. Paul Saints	AHA	36	15	4	19	26	—	—	—	—	—
1930–31	Chicago Black Hawks	NHL	30	5	7	12	8	9	1	1	2	2
1930–31	London Tecumsehs	IHL	13	5	5	10	14	—	—	—	—	—
1931–32	Chicago Black Hawks	NHL	18	1	0	1	6	2	0	0	0	0
1931–32	Pittsburgh Yellow Jackets	IHL	31	11	2	13	6	—	—	—	—	—
1932–33	Chicago Black Hawks	NHL	47	10	12	22	2	—	—	—	—	—
1933–34	Chicago Black Hawks	NHL	47	8	21	29	6	8	2	7	9	0
1934–35	Chicago Black Hawks	NHL	35	10	14	24	8	2	0	0	0	0
1935–36	Chicago Black Hawks	NHL	48	13	25	38	6	2	1	2	3	0
1936–37	Chicago Black Hawks	NHL	28	4	14	18	2	—	—	—	—	—
1937–38	Chicago Black Hawks	NHL	44	10	22	32	4	12	2	4	6	2
1938–39	Chicago Black Hawks	NHL	12	0	4	4	0	—	—	—	—	—
1938–39	Toronto Maple Leafs	NHL	36	7	16	23	0	10	1	4	5	0
1939–40	New York Americans	NHL	15	0	1	1	0	—	—	—	—	—
1939–40	Omaha Knights	AHA	14	12	19	31	6	9	3	4	7	0
NHL totals			360	68	136	204	42	45	7	18	25	4

== Head coaching record ==
Record table
Season	Team	Overall	Conference	Standing	Postseason
Michigan Tech Huskies Independent (1941–1943)
1941–42	Michigan Tech	3–6–3			
1942–43	Michigan Tech	1–9–0			
Michigan Tech:		4–15–3			
Minnesota Golden Gophers Independent (1947–1951)
1947–48	Minnesota	9–12–0			
1948–49	Minnesota	11–11–0			
1949–50	Minnesota	5–11–0			
1950–51	Minnesota	14–12–0			
Minnesota:		39–46–0			
Minnesota Golden Gophers (MCHL) (1951–1952)
1951–52	Minnesota	13–13–0	5–7–0	5th	
Minnesota:		13–13–0	5–7–0		
Total:		56–74–3			

== Awards and achievements ==
- 1936 Lady Byng Trophy winner
- 1934 Stanley Cup (Chicago Black Hawks)
- 1938 Stanley Cup (Chicago Black Hawks)

Awards and achievements
Preceded by Frank Boucher	Winner of the Lady Byng Trophy; 1936	Succeeded by Marty Barry
