= L. S. Dukowski =

Canadian hockey player

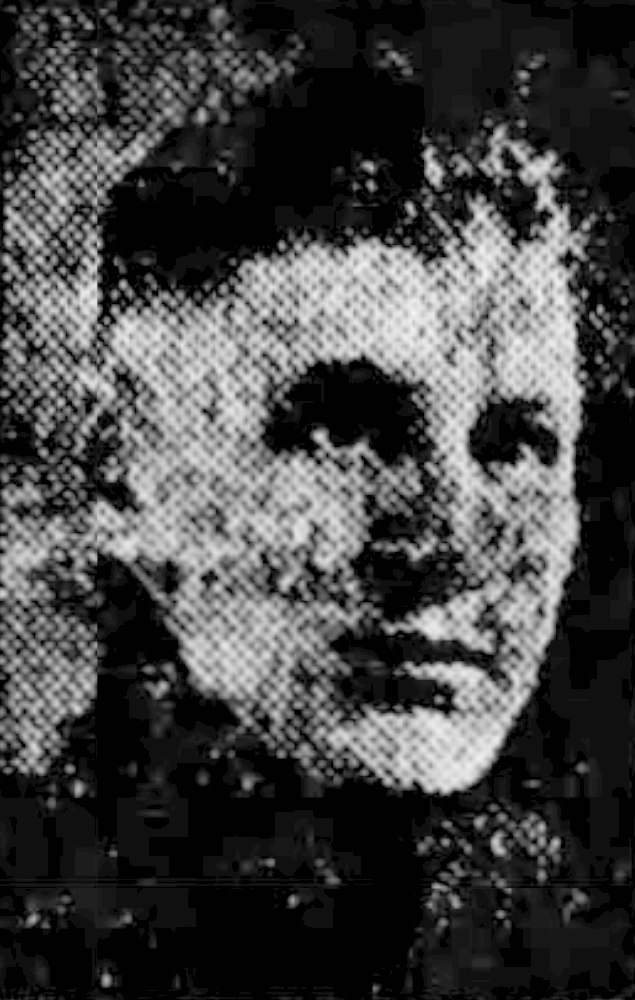
- Born: August 31, 1900; Bukowina, Austria
- Died: September 26, 1976 (aged 76); North Vancouver, British Columbia, Canada
- Height: 5 ft 10 in (178 cm)
- Weight: 185 lb (84 kg; 13 st 3 lb)
- Position: Defence
- Shot: Left
- Played for: Chicago Black Hawks; New York Americans; New York Rangers
- Playing career: 1921–1934

Wladislaw Laudas Jozef "Duke" Dukowski (August 31, 1900 — September 26, 1976) was a professional ice hockey player who played 206 games in the National Hockey League between 1926 and 1934. He played defense for the New York Rangers, New York Americans, and Chicago Black Hawks. His middle initial is sometimes erroneously stated as "S" when in fact his middle name was Joseph.

== Personal life ==
Dukowski was married and had four children. He was a salesman during the summer. Before playing hockey, he also played baseball, rugby and football.

== Amateur career ==
Dukowski played senior amateur hockey for the Regina Pats before switching to the Regina Vics and winning championships with that team in 1919, 1920, and 1921.

== Career statistics ==
=== Regular season and playoffs ===
			Regular season					Playoffs
Season	Team	League	GP	G	A	Pts	PIM	GP	G	A	Pts	PIM
1916–17	Regina Victorias	S-SSHL	3	0	1	1	0	—	—	—	—	—
1917–18	Regina Pats	RCJHL	6	12	2	14	6	5	13	8	21	7
1918–19	Regina Pats	RCJHL	10	40	8	48	6	1	2	0	2	6
1918–19	Regina Pats	M-Cup	—	—	—	—	—	7	30	6	36	6
1919–20	Regina Pats	RJrHL	5	14	1	15	16	—	—	—	—	—
1919–20	Reginas	S-SSHL	1	0	0	0	0	—	—	—	—	—
1919–20	Regina Braves	S-SSHL	1	1	0	1	0	—	—	—	—	—
1920–21	Regina Victorias	SSHL	14	4	1	5	42	4	1	0	1	6
1921–22	Moose Jaw Sheiks	WCHL	21	13	2	15	19	—	—	—	—	—
1922–23	Regina Capitals	WCHL	29	6	0	6	20	2	0	1	1	2
1923–24	Regina Capitals	WCHL	30	8	3	11	39	2	0	0	0	6
1924–25	Regina Capitals	WCHL	27	13	4	17	86	—	—	—	—	—
1925–26	Portland Rosebuds	WHL	29	5	7	12	46	—	—	—	—	—
1926–27	Chicago Black Hawks	NHL	28	3	2	5	16	2	0	0	0	0
1927–28	Kansas City Pla-Mors	AHA	37	9	3	12	87	3	0	0	0	2
1928–29	Kansas City Pla-Mors	AHA	40	10	5	15	101	—	—	—	—	—
1929–30	Chicago Black Hawks	NHL	44	7	10	17	42	2	0	0	0	6
1930–31	Chicago Black Hawks	NHL	25	1	3	4	28	—	—	—	—	—
1930–31	New York Americans	NHL	12	1	1	2	12	—	—	—	—	—
1931–32	New Haven Eagles	Can-Am	40	6	9	15	102	2	0	1	1	6
1932–33	New York Americans	NHL	48	4	7	11	43	—	—	—	—	—
1933–34	New York Americans	NHL	9	0	1	1	11	—	—	—	—	—
1933–34	Chicago Black Hawks	NHL	5	0	0	0	2	—	—	—	—	—
1933–34	New York Rangers	NHL	29	0	6	6	18	2	0	0	0	0
1933–34	Syracuse Stars	IHL	4	0	0	0	0	—	—	—	—	—
WCHL/WHL totals			136	45	16	61	210	4	0	1	1	8
NHL totals			200	16	30	46	172	6	0	0	0	6

Preceded by Dick Irvin	Chicago Black Hawks captain 1929–30	Succeeded by Ty Arbour
