= Art Coulter =

Canadian ice hockey player (1909–2000)

- Hockey Hall of Fame, 1974
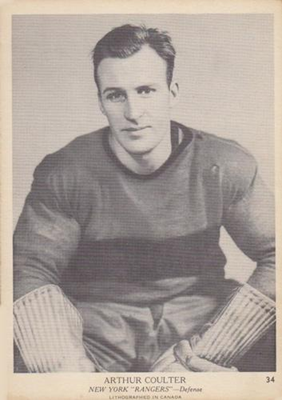
- 1940 card of Coulter
- Born: May 31, 1909 Winnipeg, Manitoba, Canada
- Died: October 14, 2000 (aged 91) Mobile, Alabama, U.S.
- Height: 5 ft 11 in (180 cm)
- Weight: 195 lb (88 kg; 13 st 13 lb)
- Position: Defence
- Shot: Right
- Played for: Chicago Black Hawks; New York Rangers
- Playing career: 1932–1942

Arthur Edmund Coulter (May 31, 1909 – October 14, 2000) was a Canadian professional ice hockey defenceman who played for the New York Rangers and Chicago Black Hawks in the National Hockey League.

Coulter, a two time Stanley Cup Champion, helped the Black Hawks win their first championship in 1933–34 and the Rangers to a Cup win in 1939–40. He succeeded Hall of Famer Bill Cook as captain of the Rangers in 1938. He was inducted into the Hockey Hall of Fame in 1974.

== Awards and achievements ==
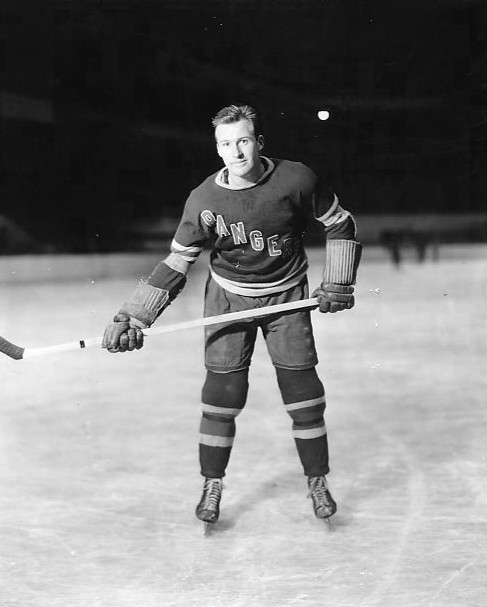
1938 photo of Coulter

- Stanley Cup Championships (1934 & 1940)
- NHL Second All-Star Team Defence (1935, 1938, 1939, & 1940)
- Inducted into the Hockey Hall of Fame in 1974
- Honoured Member of the Manitoba Hockey Hall of Fame
- Member of the Manitoba Sports Hall of Fame
- In the 2009 book 100 Ranger Greats, was ranked No. 30 all-time of the 901 New York Rangers who had played during the team's first 82 seasons

== Career statistics ==
=== Regular season and playoffs ===
			Regular season					Playoffs
Season	Team	League	GP	G	A	Pts	PIM	GP	G	A	Pts	PIM
1925–26	Winnipeg Pilgrims	MJHL	9	3	1	4	10	—	—	—	—	—
1926–27	Winnipeg Pilgrims	MJHL	5	3	2	5	6	—	—	—	—	—
1929–30	Philadelphia Arrows	Can-Am	35	2	2	4	40	2	0	0	0	2
1930–31	Philadelphia Arrows	Can-Am	40	4	8	12	109	—	—	—	—	—
1931–32	Philadelphia Arrows	Can-Am	26	9	4	13	42	—	—	—	—	—
1931–32	Chicago Black Hawks	NHL	13	0	1	1	23	2	1	0	1	0
1932–33	Chicago Black Hawks	NHL	46	3	2	5	53	—	—	—	—	—
1933–34	Chicago Black Hawks	NHL	46	5	2	7	39	8	1	0	1	10
1934–35	Chicago Black Hawks	NHL	48	4	8	12	68	2	0	0	0	5
1935–36	Chicago Black Hawks	NHL	25	0	2	2	18	—	—	—	—	—
1935–36	New York Rangers	NHL	23	1	5	6	26	—	—	—	—	—
1936–37	New York Rangers	NHL	47	1	5	6	27	9	0	3	3	15
1937–38	New York Rangers	NHL	43	5	10	15	90	—	—	—	—	—
1938–39	New York Rangers	NHL	44	4	8	12	58	7	1	1	2	6
1939–40	New York Rangers	NHL	48	1	9	10	68	12	1	0	1	21
1940–41	New York Rangers	NHL	35	5	14	19	42	3	0	0	0	0
1941–42	New York Rangers	NHL	47	1	16	17	31	6	0	1	1	4
1942–43	United States Coast Guard Cutters	EAHL	37	13	20	33	32	10	4	1	5	8
1943–44	United States Coast Guard Cutters	Exhib	26	10	13	23	10	12	6	8	14	8
NHL totals			465	30	82	112	543	49	4	5	9	61

Sporting positions
Preceded by Bill Cook	New York Rangers captain 1937–42	Succeeded by Ott Heller
