= Herbie Lewis (ice hockey) =

Canadian ice hockey player (1905–1991)

- Hockey Hall of Fame, 1989
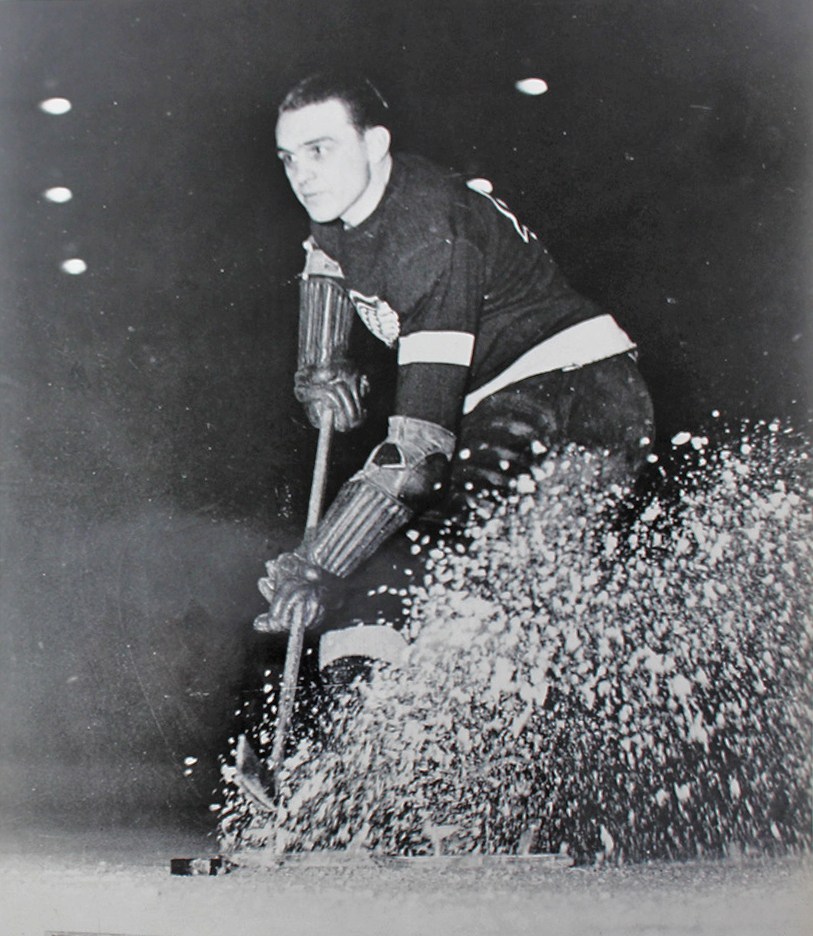
- Born: April 17, 1905 Calgary, Alberta, Canada
- Died: January 20, 1991 (aged 85) Indianapolis, Indiana, U.S.
- Height: 5 ft 9 in (175 cm)
- Weight: 160 lb (73 kg; 11 st 6 lb)
- Position: Left wing
- Shot: Left
- Played for: Detroit Red Wings
- Playing career: 1928–1941

Herbert Albert Lewis (April 17, 1905 – January 20, 1991) was a Canadian professional ice hockey left winger who played for the Detroit Cougars/Falcons/Red Wings in the National Hockey League from 1928 to 1939. Born in Calgary, Alberta, Lewis journeyed to Duluth in 1924 and played with the Hornets in the USAHA where he was given the nickname "The Duke of Duluth".

Lewis was one of the fastest skaters of his day. He helped the Red Wings win the Stanley Cup in 1936 and 1937. He was inducted into the Hockey Hall of Fame in 1989.

== Career statistics ==
=== Regular season and playoffs ===
			Regular season					Playoffs
Season	Team	League	GP	G	A	Pts	PIM	GP	G	A	Pts	PIM
1921–22	Calgary Hustlers	CCJHL	—	—	—	—	—	—	—	—	—	—
1921–22	Calgary Hustlers	M-Cup	—	—	—	—	—	6	5	1	6	2
1922–23	Calgary Canadians	CCJHL	12	17	7	24	24	—	—	—	—	—
1922–23	Calgary Canadians	M-Cup	—	—	—	—	—	4	5	4	9	8
1923–24	Calgary Canadians	CCJHL	—	—	—	—	—	—	—	—	—	—
1923–24	Calgary Canadians	M-Cup	—	—	—	—	—	7	12	8	20	13
1924–25	Duluth Hornets	USAHA	40	9	0	9	—	—	—	—	—	—
1925–26	Duluth Hornets	CHL	39	17	11	28	52	8	3	1	4	8
1926–27	Duluth Hornets	AHA	37	18	6	24	52	3	1	0	1	2
1927–28	Duluth Hornets	AHA	40	14	5	19	56	5	0	0	0	8
1928–29	Detroit Cougars	NHL	36	9	5	14	33	—	—	—	—	—
1929–30	Detroit Cougars	NHL	44	20	11	31	36	—	—	—	—	—
1930–31	Detroit Falcons	NHL	43	15	6	21	38	—	—	—	—	—
1931–32	Detroit Falcons	NHL	48	5	14	19	21	2	0	0	0	0
1932–33	Detroit Red Wings	NHL	48	20	14	34	20	4	1	0	1	0
1933–34	Detroit Red Wings	NHL	43	16	15	31	15	9	5	2	7	2
1934–35	Detroit Red Wings	NHL	47	16	27	43	26	—	—	—	—	—
1935–36	Detroit Red Wings	NHL	45	14	23	37	25	7	2	3	5	0
1936–37	Detroit Red Wings	NHL	45	14	18	32	14	10	4	3	7	4
1937–38	Detroit Red Wings	NHL	42	13	18	31	12	—	—	—	—	—
1938–39	Detroit Red Wings	NHL	42	6	10	16	8	6	1	2	3	0
1939–40	Indianapolis Capitals	IAHL	26	1	6	7	6	3	1	2	3	0
1940–41	Indianapolis Capitals	AHL	2	1	0	1	0	—	—	—	—	—
NHL totals			483	148	161	309	248	38	13	10	23	6

Preceded by Larry Aurie	Detroit Red Wings captain 1933–34	Succeeded by Ebbie Goodfellow
