= 1933–34 Chicago Black Hawks season =

NHL ice hockey team season (won Stanley Cup)

1933–34 Chicago Black Hawks
- Stanley Cup champions
- Division: 2nd American
- 1933–34 record: 20–17–11
- Home record: 13–4–7
- Road record: 7–13–4
- Goals for: 88
- Goals against: 83

Team information
- General manager: Frederic McLaughlin
- Coach: Tommy Gorman
- Captain: Chuck Gardiner
- Arena: Chicago Stadium

Team leaders
- Goals: Paul Thompson (20)
- Assists: Doc Romnes (21)
- Points: Paul Thompson (36)
- Penalty minutes: Lionel Conacher (87)
- Wins: Chuck Gardiner (20)
- Goals against average: Chuck Gardiner (1.63)

The 1933–34 Chicago Black Hawks season was the team's eighth season in the NHL, and they were coming off a disappointing 1932–33 season, as the Hawks finished in last place in the American Division and missed the playoffs. Tommy Gorman was brought back to be the head coach of the Black Hawks, and while the team would score an NHL low 88 goals, they also allowed an NHL best 83 goals, and have a 20–17–11 record to finish in 2nd place in the American Division. Goaltender Chuck Gardiner was named captain of the team for the season.

Paul Thompson would score a team leading 20 goals and 36 points, while Doc Romnes earned a club high 21 assists. Johnny Gottselig would have a strong season, recording 16 goals and 30 points, while Lionel Conacher, acquired from the Montreal Maroons before the season began, would bolster the blueline, leading all defensemen with 23 points and had a club high 87 penalty minutes.

In goal, Chuck Gardiner would win his 2nd Vezina Trophy, as he helped the Black Hawks to a league low 83 goals against. Gardiner would win 20 games, post 10 shutouts and set a club record with a 1.63 GAA.

The Hawks would face the Montreal Canadiens in the 1st round of the playoffs in a 2-game total goal series, and after winning the first game at the Montreal Forum by a 3–2 score, the Black Hawks would tie Montreal 1–1 in the 2nd game to win the series by a 4–3 score. In the 2nd round, Chicago would face the other Montreal team, the Montreal Maroons, in another 2 game total goal series. The Hawks would once again win the opening game, this time by a 3–0 score, and then Chicago would hold off the Maroons in the 2nd game, winning 3–2, to win the series by a 6–2 score, allowing the Hawks to advance to their second Stanley Cup Finals in three years. The Hawks would face the Detroit Red Wings in a best of 5 series, and the Black Hawks would take the first 2 games in Detroit, returning home needing only 1 win to clinch the Stanley Cup. The Wings spoiled the party in game 3, beating the Black Hawks by a 5–2 victory, but the Black Hawks would come back, and win the 4th game 1–0 in double overtime to clinch their first ever Stanley Cup.

The Black Hawks Stanley Cup celebration would be cut short, when goaltender Chuck Gardiner would suffer from a brain hemorrhage, and died on June 13, 1934, due to brain surgery complications.

== Season standings ==
American Division
	GP	W	L	T	GF	GA	PTS
**Detroit Red Wings**	48	24	14	10	113	98	58
**Chicago Black Hawks**	48	20	17	11	88	83	51
**New York Rangers**	48	21	19	8	120	113	50
Boston Bruins	48	18	25	5	111	130	41

Note: GP = Games Played, W = Wins, L = Losses, T = Ties, Pts = Points, GF = Goals For, GA = Goals Against
Teams that qualified for the playoffs are highlighted in bold.

=== Record vs. opponents ===
==== Vs. American Division ====
1933–34 NHL records
Team	**BOS**	**CHI**	**DET**	**NYR**	**Total**
Boston	—	3–2–1	1–4–1	2–3–1	**6–9–3**
Chicago	2–3–1	—	1–4–1	2–3–1	**5–10–3**
Detroit	4–1–1	4–1–1	—	3–3	**11–5–2**
N.Y. Rangers	3–2–1	3–2–1	3–3	—	**9–7–2**

==== Vs. Canadian Division ====
1933–34 NHL records
Team	**MTL**	**MTM**	**NYA**	**OTT**	**TOR**	**Total**
Boston	5–1	1–4–1	3–3	2–4	1–4–1	**12–16–2**
Chicago	3–2–1	2–2–2	3–1–2	4–0–2	3–2–1	**15–7–8**
Detroit	2–3–1	2–1–3	3–0–3	4–2	2–3–1	**13–9–8**
N.Y. Rangers	3–2–1	3–2–1	2–4	4–1–1	0–3–3	**12–12–6**

== Schedule and results ==
=== Regular season ===
1933–34 regular season
November

Game	Date	Visitor	Score	Home	Record	Points
1	November 9	New York Americans	2–2	Chicago Black Hawks	0–0–1	1
2	November 12	New York Rangers	0–1	Chicago Black Hawks	1–0–1	3
3	November 14	Chicago Black Hawks	1–3	Montreal Canadiens	1–1–1	3
4	November 16	Chicago Black Hawks	2–1	Ottawa Senators	2–1–1	5
5	November 19	Ottawa Senators	1–2	Chicago Black Hawks	3–1–1	7
6	November 21	Chicago Black Hawks	0–2	Boston Bruins	3–2–1	7
7	November 23	Chicago Black Hawks	2–0	New York Americans	4–2–1	9
8	November 26	Boston Bruins	0–1	Chicago Black Hawks	5–2–1	11
9	November 30	Chicago Black Hawks	1–2	Detroit Red Wings	5–3–1	11

December

Game	Date	Visitor	Score	Home	Record	Points
10	December 3	Chicago Black Hawks	0–1	New York Rangers	5–4–1	11
11	December 7	Montreal Maroons	1–3	Chicago Black Hawks	6–4–1	13
12	December 9	Chicago Black Hawks	0–1	Toronto Maple Leafs	6–5–1	13
13	December 12	Chicago Black Hawks	1–4	Detroit Red Wings	6–6–1	13
14	December 14	Detroit Red Wings	0–4	Chicago Black Hawks	7–6–1	15
15	December 17	Montreal Canadiens	1–4	Chicago Black Hawks	8–6–1	17
16	December 19	Chicago Black Hawks	2–2	Ottawa Senators	8–6–2	18
17	December 21	Chicago Black Hawks	0–0	Montreal Maroons	8–6–3	19
18	December 23	Chicago Black Hawks	3–1	Boston Bruins	9–6–3	21
19	December 26	Chicago Black Hawks	2–1	New York Americans	10–6–3	23
20	December 28	Ottawa Senators	2–2	Chicago Black Hawks	10–6–4	24

January

Game	Date	Visitor	Score	Home	Record	Points
21	January 1	Toronto Maple Leafs	2–1	Chicago Black Hawks	10–7–4	24
22	January 7	New York Rangers	1–1	Chicago Black Hawks	10–7–5	25
23	January 11	Boston Bruins	0–0	Chicago Black Hawks	10–7–6	26
24	January 14	New York Americans	0–4	Chicago Black Hawks	11–7–6	28
25	January 16	Chicago Black Hawks	5–6	Montreal Maroons	11–8–6	28
26	January 18	Chicago Black Hawks	0–5	New York Rangers	11–9–6	28
27	January 20	Chicago Black Hawks	2–2	Toronto Maple Leafs	11–9–7	29
28	January 21	Montreal Maroons	2–2	Chicago Black Hawks	11–9–8	30
29	January 25	Montreal Canadiens	1–2	Chicago Black Hawks	12–9–8	32
30	January 28	Toronto Maple Leafs	0–2	Chicago Black Hawks	13–9–8	34
31	January 30	Chicago Black Hawks	2–0	Ottawa Senators	14–9–8	36

February

Game	Date	Visitor	Score	Home	Record	Points
32	February 1	Chicago Black Hawks	3–3	Montreal Canadiens	14–9–9	37
33	February 4	Boston Bruins	2–1	Chicago Black Hawks	14–10–9	37
34	February 8	Detroit Red Wings	1–1	Chicago Black Hawks	14–10–10	38
35	February 11	Montreal Canadiens	1–4	Chicago Black Hawks	15–10–10	40
36	February 15	Ottawa Senators	2–5	Chicago Black Hawks	16–10–10	42
37	February 18	Chicago Black Hawks	2–1	New York Rangers	17–10–10	44
38	February 20	Chicago Black Hawks	1–3	New York Americans	17–11–10	44
39	February 22	New York Americans	0–0	Chicago Black Hawks	17–11–11	45
40	February 24	Chicago Black Hawks	2–3	Montreal Canadiens	17–12–11	45
41	February 27	Chicago Black Hawks	1–3	Boston Bruins	17–13–11	45

March

Game	Date	Visitor	Score	Home	Record	Points
42	March 1	New York Rangers	3–1	Chicago Black Hawks	17–14–11	45
43	March 4	Montreal Maroons	2–4	Chicago Black Hawks	18–14–11	47
44	March 8	Detroit Red Wings	3–0	Chicago Black Hawks	18–15–11	47
45	March 11	Chicago Black Hawks	2–3	Detroit Red Wings	18–16–11	47
46	March 13	Chicago Black Hawks	2–6	Montreal Maroons	18–17–11	47
47	March 15	Chicago Black Hawks	2–1	Toronto Maple Leafs	19–17–11	49
48	March 18	Toronto Maple Leafs	2–3	Chicago Black Hawks	20–17–11	51

Legend: Win (2 points) Loss (0 points) Tie (1 point)

== Playoffs ==
=== Black Hawks 4, Canadiens 3 ===
==== NHL quarter-finals ====
===== (A2) Chicago Black Hawks vs. (C2) Montreal Canadiens =====
March 22	Chicago Black Hawks	3 – 2	Montreal Canadiens	Montreal Forum	Recap
Gottselig (1) – sh – (Unassisted) – 3:04		First period	13:40 – sh – Morenz (1) – (Larochelle); 17:15 – Larochelle (1) – (Mondou, Morenz)
Conacher (1) – (Romnes) – 10:15		Second period	No scoring
Gottselig (2) – (Couture, McFadyen) – 4:34		Third period	No scoring
Gardiner (1-0-0)		Goalie stats	Chabot (0-1-0)

March 25	Montreal Canadiens	1 – 1	OT	Chicago Black Hawks	Chicago Stadium	Recap
Gagnon (1) – (Riley) – 15:07		First period		No scoring
No scoring		Second period		No scoring
No scoring		Third period		No scoring
No scoring		First overtime period		11:05 – March (1) – (Romnes, Thompson)
Chabot (0-1-1)		Goalie stats		Gardiner (1-0-1)

Chicago wins series 4 – 3

=== Black Hawks 6, Maroons 2 ===
==== NHL semi-finals ====
===== (A2) Chicago Black Hawks vs. (C3) Montreal Maroons =====
March 28	Chicago Black Hawks	3 – 0	Montreal Maroons	Montreal Forum	Recap
Romnes (1) – (Thompson) – 0:43		First period	No scoring
Thompson (1) – (Romnes) – 1:00; McFadyen (1) – (Gottselig) – 3:25		Second period	No scoring
No scoring		Third period	No scoring
Gardiner (2-0-1)		Goalie stats	Kerr (1-1-1)

April 1	Montreal Maroons	2 – 3	Chicago Black Hawks	Chicago Stadium	Recap
Northcott (1) – (Wentworth, Smith) – 11:22		First period	0:25 – Thompson (2) – (Romnes, March)
No scoring		Second period	5:30 – McFadyen (2) – (Gottselig)
Northcott (2) – (Wentworth) – 1:40		Third period	7:55 – Cook (1) – (Unassisted)
Kerr (1-2-1)		Goalie stats	Gardiner (3-0-1)

Chicago wins series 6 – 2

=== Black Hawks 3, Red Wings 1 ===
==== Staney Cup finals ====
===== (A1) Detroit Red Wings vs. (A2) Chicago Black Hawks =====
April 3	Chicago Black Hawks	2 – 1	2OT	Detroit Red Wings	Detroit Olympia	Recap
Conacher (2) – (Unassisted) – 17:50		First period		No scoring
No scoring		Second period		No scoring
No scoring		Third period		4:40 – Lewis (5) – (Aurie, Graham)
Thompson (3) – (Romnes) – 1:10		Second overtime period		No scoring
Gardiner (4-0-1)		Goalie stats		Cude (3-3-0)

April 5	Chicago Black Hawks	4 – 1	Detroit Red Wings	Detroit Olympia	Recap
Couture (1) – 17:52		First period	No scoring
No scoring		Second period	9:58 – Lewis (6) – (Weiland)
Romnes (2) – (Thompson) – 1:28; Coulter (1) – (Gottselig) – 5:34; Gottselig (3) – (Unassisted) – 18:02		Third period	No scoring
Gardiner (5-0-1)		Goalie stats	Cude (3-4-0)

April 8	Detroit Red Wings	5 – 2	Chicago Black Hawks	Chicago Stadium	Recap
Pettinger (1) – (Starr, Carson) – 6:07; Aurie (2) – (Buswell) – 8:40		First period	0:28 – Thompson (4) – (March, Romnes)
No scoring		Second period	18:07 – Gottselig (4) – (Couture, McFadyen)
Young (1) – (Unassisted) – 13:50; Weiland (2) – (Aurie, Lewis) – 18:20		Third period	No scoring
Cude (4-4-0)		Goalie stats	Gardiner (5-1-1)

April 10	Detroit Red Wings	0 – 1	2OT	Chicago Black Hawks	Chicago Stadium	Recap
No scoring		First period		No scoring
No scoring		Second period		No scoring
No scoring		Third period		No scoring
No scoring		Second overtime period		10:05 – March (2) – (Romnes)
Cude (4-5-0)		Goalie stats		Gardiner (6-1-1)

Chicago wins series 3 – 1

== Player statistics ==
=== Scoring leaders ===
Player	GP	G	A	Pts	PIM
Paul Thompson	48	20	16	36	17
Johnny Gottselig	48	16	14	30	4
Doc Romnes	47	7	21	28	6
Lionel Conacher	48	10	13	23	87
Mush March	48	4	13	17	26

=== Goaltending ===
Player	GP	TOI	W	L	T	GA	SO	GAA
Chuck Gardiner	48	3050	20	17	11	83	10	1.63

== Playoff stats ==
=== Scoring leaders ===
Player	GP	G	A	Pts	PIM
Doc Romnes	8	2	7	9	0
Johnny Gottselig	8	4	3	7	4
Paul Thompson	8	4	3	7	6
Don McFadyen	8	2	2	4	5
Mush March	8	2	2	4	6

=== Goaltending ===
Player	GP	TOI	W	L	T	GA	SO	GAA
Chuck Gardiner	8	542	6	1	1	12	2	1.33
