= Bob Gracie =

Canadian ice hockey player (1910-1963)

- Born: November 8, 1910 North Bay, Ontario, Canada
- Died: August 3, 1963 (aged 52) Houston, Texas, U.S.
- Height: 5 ft 9 in (175 cm)
- Weight: 155 lb (70 kg; 11 st 1 lb)
- Position: Centre
- Shot: Left
- Played for: Toronto Maple Leafs; Boston Bruins; New York Americans; Montreal Maroons; Montreal Canadiens; Chicago Black Hawks
- Playing career: 1930–1939

Robert John Gracie (November 8, 1910 – August 3, 1963) was a Canadian professional ice hockey centre who played 10 seasons in the National Hockey League (NHL) for the Toronto Maple Leafs, Boston Bruins, New York Americans, Montreal Maroons, Montreal Canadiens and Chicago Black Hawks.

== Playing career ==
=== Toronto Maple Leafs ===
The North Bay, Ontario native came out of the Toronto junior hockey ranks, eventually signing on as a free agent with Conn Smythe's Toronto Maple Leafs. Gracie made the jump from the OHA's Toronto Marlboros and appeared in eight games for the Leafs in the 1930–31 NHL season registering four goals and two assists for six points. The following season Gracie appeared in all forty eight regular season games for the Maple Leafs and all seven post-season contests. Playing on a line with Frank Finnigan and Harold Darragh he helped Toronto win a Stanley Cup in their first season at Maple Leaf Gardens, sweeping the New York Rangers in the Stanley Cup Finals three games to none in the best-of-five series. Gracie would once again appear in all forty eight regular season games the following year with the Leafs, helping them back to the Stanley Cup Finals in 1932–33, where they faced off against New York once again, only to see the Rangers prevail in the final series three games to one.

=== Boston Bruins and New York Americans ===
Gracie's time with Toronto came to an end after being traded to the Ottawa Senators for Hec Kilrea before the start of the 1933–34 season. Ottawa in turn, immediately dealt him the same day to the Boston Bruins for Percy Galbraith, Bud Cook and Teddy Saunders. Gracie played the first 24 games of the season for the Bruins before being traded again, this time to the New York Americans. He played the remaining 24 games for New York appearing in all 48 games of the regular season for the third consecutive year.

=== Montreal Maroons ===
After stints in Boston and New York, Gracie found himself back in Canada after his rights were sold to the Montreal Maroons. Maroons' general manager and coach Tommy Gorman put him on a line with newly acquired Gus Marker and sophomore left winger Herb Cain, to form what would later be dubbed the "Green Line." Gracie won the second Stanley Cup of his career in his first season with the Maroons in 1934–35.

=== Montreal Canadiens and Chicago Black Hawks ===
Before the start of the 1938–39 NHL season Gracie was sold to the Canadiens but would only play seven games that year for Montreal when the Chicago Black Hawks purchased his rights. He would split the remainder of the season with Chicago and the Cleveland Barons of the IAHL.

=== Minor leagues ===
In 1944–45, while playing for the Pittsburgh Hornets, Gracie led the American Hockey League in scoring with 95 points, tying for the lead with teammate Bob Walton.

== Awards and achievements ==
- 1931–32 - Stanley Cup Champion - Toronto Maple Leafs
- 1934–35 - Stanley Cup Champion - Montreal Maroons
- 1944–45 - AHL Scoring Leader (tied with teammate Bob Walton) - Pittsburgh Hornets

== Career statistics ==
=== Regular season and playoffs ===
			Regular season					Playoffs
Season	Team	League	GP	G	A	Pts	PIM	GP	G	A	Pts	PIM
1926–27	North Bay Centennials	NOJHA	4	8	4	12	2	—	—	—	—	—
1927–28	North Bay Trappers	NOHA	11	11	1	12	6	2	1	0	1	0
1928–29	Kirkland Lake Lakers	NOHA	6	24	6	30	4	4	3	3	6	2
1929–30	West Toronto Nationals	OHA	7	17	6	23	12	2	2	1	3	0
1930–31	Toronto Eaton's	TMHL	15	11	4	15	45	—	—	—	—	—
1930–31	Toronto Marlboros	OHA	10	4	6	10	6	3	2	0	2	6
1930–31	Toronto Maple Leafs	NHL	8	4	2	6	4	2	0	0	0	0
1931–32	Toronto Maple Leafs	NHL	48	13	8	21	29	7	3	1	4	0
1932–33	Toronto Maple Leafs	NHL	48	9	13	22	27	9	0	1	1	0
1933–34	Boston Bruins	NHL	24	2	6	8	16	—	—	—	—	—
1933–34	New York Americans	NHL	24	4	6	10	4	—	—	—	—	—
1934–35	New York Americans	NHL	14	2	1	3	4	—	—	—	—	—
1934–35	New Haven Eagles	Can-Am	1	1	2	3	0	—	—	—	—	—
1934–35	Montreal Maroons	NHL	32	10	8	18	8	7	0	2	2	2
1935–36	Montreal Maroons	NHL	46	11	14	25	31	3	0	1	1	0
1936–37	Montreal Maroons	NHL	48	11	25	36	18	5	1	2	3	2
1937–38	Montreal Maroons	NHL	48	12	19	31	32	—	—	—	—	—
1938–39	Montreal Canadiens	NHL	7	0	1	1	4	—	—	—	—	—
1938–39	Chicago Black Hawks	NHL	31	4	6	10	27	—	—	—	—	—
1938–39	Cleveland Barons	IAHL	11	1	5	6	0	9	4	2	6	0
1939–40	Cleveland Barons	IAHL	37	10	11	21	13	—	—	—	—	—
1939–40	Indianapolis Capitals	IAHL	19	5	9	14	19	5	1	0	1	0
1940–41	Buffalo Bisons	AHL	56	22	26	48	2	—	—	—	—	—
1941–42	Buffalo Bisons	AHL	35	10	10	20	8	—	—	—	—	—
1941–42	Hershey Bears	AHL	17	8	6	14	0	7	2	3	5	0
1942–43	Hershey Bears	AHL	11	0	4	4	6	—	—	—	—	—
1942–43	Washington Lions	AHL	46	27	32	59	12	—	—	—	—	—
1943–44	Pittsburgh Hornets	AHL	41	13	21	34	11	—	—	—	—	—
1944–45	Pittsburgh Hornets	AHL	58	40	55	95	4	—	—	—	—	—
1945–46	Pittsburgh Hornets	AHL	4	4	4	8	0	—	—	—	—	—
1945–46	Hollywood Wolves	PCHL	16	7	7	14	13	—	—	—	—	—
1946–47	Hollywood Wolves	PCHL	2	4	0	4	10	—	—	—	—	—
1947–48	Fresno Falcons	PCHL	8	3	2	5	2	—	—	—	—	—
NHL totals			378	82	109	191	204	33	4	7	11	4
