= 1933–34 New York Rangers season =

NHL hockey team season

1933–34 New York Rangers
- Division: 3rd American
- 1933–34 record: 21–19–8
- Home record: 11–7–6
- Road record: 10–12–2
- Goals for: 136
- Goals against: 143

Team information
- General manager: Lester Patrick
- Coach: Lester Patrick
- Captain: Bill Cook
- Arena: Madison Square Garden

Team leaders
- Goals: Bun Cook (18)
- Assists: Frank Boucher (30)
- Points: Frank Boucher (44)
- Penalty minutes: Ching Johnson (86)
- Wins: Andy Aitkenhead (21)
- Goals against average: Andy Aitkenhead (2.27)

The 1933–34 New York Rangers season was the franchise's eighth season. In the regular season, the Rangers finished third in the American Division with a 21–19–8 record. New York qualified for the Stanley Cup playoffs, where they lost to the Montreal Maroons 2–1 in a two-game, total goals series.

== Regular season ==
=== Final standings ===
American Division
	GP	W	L	T	GF	GA	PTS
**Detroit Red Wings**	48	24	14	10	113	98	58
**Chicago Black Hawks**	48	20	17	11	88	83	51
**New York Rangers**	48	21	19	8	120	113	50
Boston Bruins	48	18	25	5	111	130	41

Note: GP = Games Played, W = Wins, L = Losses, T = Ties, Pts = Points, GF = Goals For, GA = Goals Against
Teams that qualified for the playoffs are highlighted in bold.

=== Record vs. opponents ===
==== Vs. American Division ====
1933–34 NHL records
Team	**BOS**	**CHI**	**DET**	**NYR**	**Total**
Boston	—	3–2–1	1–4–1	2–3–1	**6–9–3**
Chicago	2–3–1	—	1–4–1	2–3–1	**5–10–3**
Detroit	4–1–1	4–1–1	—	3–3	**11–5–2**
N.Y. Rangers	3–2–1	3–2–1	3–3	—	**9–7–2**

==== Vs. Canadian Division ====
1933–34 NHL records
Team	**MTL**	**MTM**	**NYA**	**OTT**	**TOR**	**Total**
Boston	5–1	1–4–1	3–3	2–4	1–4–1	**12–16–2**
Chicago	3–2–1	2–2–2	3–1–2	4–0–2	3–2–1	**15–7–8**
Detroit	2–3–1	2–1–3	3–0–3	4–2	2–3–1	**13–9–8**
N.Y. Rangers	3–2–1	3–2–1	2–4	4–1–1	0–3–3	**12–12–6**

== Schedule and results ==
1933–34 regular season
November: 1–4–1 (home: 1–0–1; road: 0–4–0)

Game	November	Opponent	Score	Record
1	11	@ Toronto Maple Leafs	4–3	0–1–0
2	12	@ Chicago Black Hawks	1–0	0–2–0
3	16	Detroit Red Wings	2–1	1–2–0
4	19	@ Detroit Red Wings	4–1	1–3–0
5	21	Toronto Maple Leafs	1 – 1 OT	1–3–1
6	25	@ Montreal Maroons	1–0	1–4–1

December: 6–2–4 (home: 2–2–4; road: 4–0–0)

Game	December	Opponent	Score	Record
7	2	@ Boston Bruins	3–0	2–4–1
8	3	Chicago Black Hawks	1 – 0 OT	3–4–1
9	7	Montreal Canadiens	0 – 0 OT	3–4–2
10	9	@ Montreal Canadiens	4–2	4–4–2
11	12	New York Americans	3–0	4–5–2
12	14	@ Ottawa Senators	4–3	5–5–2
13	17	Boston Bruins	2 – 2 OT	5–5–3
14	21	Ottawa Senators	0 – 0 OT	5–5–4
15	24	@ New York Americans	3–1	6–5–4
16	25	Montreal Maroons	3–0	7–5–4
17	28	Toronto Maple Leafs	2 – 2 OT	7–5–5
18	31	New York Americans	3–1	7–6–5

January: 8–4–1 (home: 6–0–0; road: 2–4–1)

Game	January	Opponent	Score	Record
19	2	Montreal Canadiens	3–2	8–6–5
20	4	@ Detroit Red Wings	3–1	8–7–5
21	7	@ Chicago Black Hawks	1 – 1 OT	8–7–6
22	9	Detroit Red Wings	2–1	9–7–6
23	11	@ Ottawa Senators	5–3	10–7–6
24	14	Montreal Maroons	3–1	11–7–6
25	16	@ New York Americans	2–1	11–8–6
26	18	Chicago Black Hawks	5–0	12–8–6
27	20	@ Montreal Canadiens	5–4	12–9–6
28	23	Ottawa Senators	5–2	13–9–6
29	25	@ Ottawa Senators	6–3	14–9–6
30	28	Boston Bruins	4–2	15–9–6
31	30	@ Boston Bruins	2–1	15–10–6

February: 4–5–1 (home: 2–2–1; road: 2–3–0)

Game	February	Opponent	Score	Record
32	1	Toronto Maple Leafs	5 – 5 OT	15–10–7
33	3	@ Montreal Maroons	4–2	16–10–7
34	6	Montreal Canadiens	3–0	17–10–7
35	11	New York Americans	4–3	17–11–7
36	13	@ Boston Bruins	6–4	18–11–7
37	15	@ Montreal Canadiens	5–2	18–12–7
38	18	Chicago Black Hawks	2–1	18–13–7
39	22	Detroit Red Wings	3–1	19–13–7
40	24	@ Toronto Maple Leafs	8–3	19–14–7
41	27	@ Detroit Red Wings	5–1	19–15–7

March: 2–4–1 (home: 0–3–0; road: 2–1–1)

Game	March	Opponent	Score	Record
42	1	@ Chicago Black Hawks	3–1	20–15–7
43	6	Ottawa Senators	5 – 4 OT	20–16–7
44	8	@ Montreal Maroons	2 – 2 OT	20–16–8
45	11	Montreal Maroons	7 – 3 OT	20–17–8
46	13	@ New York Americans	2–1	21–17–8
47	15	Boston Bruins	3–2	21–18–8
48	17	@ Toronto Maple Leafs	3–2	21–19–8

Legend: Win (2 points) Loss (0 points) Tie (1 point)

== Playoffs ==
1934 Stanley Cup playoffs
Quarterfinals vs. (C3) Montreal Maroons – Maroons win 2 goals to 1 goal

Game	Date	Visitor	Score	Home	OT	Series
1	March 20	New York Rangers	0–0	Montreal Maroons	OT	Series tied 0 goals to 0 goals
2	March 25	Montreal Maroons	2–1	New York Rangers		Montreal wins series 2 goals to 1 goal

Legend: Win Loss Tie

== Player statistics ==
Skaters

Regular season
Player	GP	G	A	Pts	PIM
Frank Boucher	48	14	30	44	4
Cecil Dillon	48	13	26	39	10
Frederick Cook	48	18	15	33	36
Murray Murdoch	48	17	10	27	29
Bill Cook	48	13	13	26	21
Earl Seibert	48	13	10	23	66
Melville Keeling	48	15	5	20	20
Vic Ripley^{†}	35	5	12	17	10
Oscar Asmundson	46	2	6	8	8
Ivan Johnson	48	2	6	8	86
Ehrhardt Heller	48	2	5	7	29
Danny Cox^{†}	15	5	0	5	2
Art Somers	8	1	2	3	5
Loudus Dutkowski^{†}	29	0	3	3	16
Jean Pusie	19	0	2	2	17
Albert Siebert^{†}	13	0	1	1	18
Albert Leduc^{†}	7	0	0	0	6
Lorne Carr	14	0	0	0	0
Doug Brennan	37	0	0	0	18

Playoffs
Player	GP	G	A	Pts	PIM
Vic Ripley	2	1	0	1	4
Cecil Dillon	2	0	1	1	2
Doug Brennan	1	0	0	0	0
Loudus Dutkowski	2	0	0	0	0
Art Somers	2	0	0	0	0
Danny Cox	2	0	0	0	0
Ehrhardt Heller	2	0	0	0	0
Ivan Johnson	2	0	0	0	4
Oscar Asmundson	1	0	0	0	0
Melville Keeling	2	0	0	0	0
Earl Seibert	2	0	0	0	4
Bill Cook	2	0	0	0	2
Murray Murdoch	2	0	0	0	0
Frederick Cook	2	0	0	0	2
Frank Boucher	2	0	0	0	0

Goaltenders

Regular season
Player	GP	TOI	W	L	T	GA	GAA	SO
Andy Aitkenhead	48	2990	21	19	8	113	2.27	7

Playoffs
Player	GP	TOI	W	L	T	GA	GAA	SO
Andy Aitkenhead	2	120	0	1	1	2	1.00	1

^{†}Denotes player spent time with another team before joining Rangers. Stats reflect time with Rangers only.
^{‡}Traded mid-season. Stats reflect time with Rangers only.

Note:

Pos = Position;GP = Games played; G = Goals; A = Assists; Pts = Points; PIM = Penalty minutes; +/- = Plus/minus; PPG = Power-play goals; SHG = Short-handed goals; GWG = Game-winning goals
Pos = Position;GP = Games played; Min, TOI = Minutes played; W = Wins; L = Losses; T,T/OT = Ties; OTL = Overtime losses; GA = Goals-against; GAA = Goals-against average; SO = Shutouts; SA = Shots against; SV = Shots saved;SV% = Save percentage;

== See also ==
- 1933–34 NHL season
