= 1931–32 Montreal Canadiens season =

NHL hockey team season

1931–32 Montreal Canadiens
- O'Brien Trophy winners
- Division: 1st Canadian
- 1931–32 record: 25–16–7
- Home record: 18–3–3
- Road record: 7–13–4
- Goals for: 128
- Goals against: 111

Team information
- General manager: Leo Dandurand
- Coach: Cecil Hart
- Captain: Sylvio Mantha
- Arena: Montreal Forum

Team leaders
- Goals: Howie Morenz (24)
- Assists: Howie Morenz (25)
- Points: Howie Morenz (49)
- Penalty minutes: Albert Leduc; Sylvio Mantha (60)
- Wins: George Hainsworth (25)
- Goals against average: George Hainsworth (2.19)

The 1931–32 Montreal Canadiens season was the team's 23rd season. After winning two consecutive Stanley Cup championships, the Canadiens were favoured to repeat, winning the Canadian division, but lost to the New York Rangers in the semi-finals.

== Regular season ==
Howie Morenz won the Hart Trophy for his outstanding play during the regular season.

=== Final standings ===
Canadian Division
	GP	W	L	T	GF	GA	PTS
**Montreal Canadiens**	48	25	16	7	128	111	57
**Toronto Maple Leafs**	48	23	18	7	155	127	53
**Montreal Maroons**	48	19	22	7	142	139	45
New York Americans	48	16	24	8	95	142	40

Note: W = Wins, L = Losses, T = Ties, GF = Goals For, GA = Goals Against, Pts = Points
Teams that qualified for the playoffs are highlighted in bold.

=== Record vs. opponents ===
==== Vs. Canadian Division ====
1931–32 NHL records
Team	**MTL**	**MTM**	**NYA**	**TOR**	**Total**
M. Canadiens	—	5–2–1	4–4	4–2–2	**13–8–3**
M. Maroons	2–5–1	—	4–3–1	3–5	**9–13–2**
N.Y. Americans	4–4	3–4–1	—	1–4–3	**8–12–4**
Toronto	2–4–2	5–3	4–1–3	—	**11–8–5**

==== Vs. American Division ====
1931–32 NHL records
Team	**BOS**	**CHI**	**DET**	**NYR**	**Total**
M. Canadiens	2–3–1	4–1–1	3–2–1	3–2–1	**12–8–4**
M. Maroons	4–1–1	1–2–3	3–3	2–3–1	**10–9–5**
N.Y. Americans	3–2–1	1–4–1	2–2–2	2–4	**8–12–4**
Toronto	3–2–1	2–3–1	3–3	4–2	**12–10–2**

== Schedule and results ==
1931–32 regular season
November

Game	Result	Date	Score	Opponent	Record
1	L	November 12, 1931	1–4	New York Rangers (1931–32)	0–1–0
2	T	November 14, 1931	1–1 OT	@ Toronto Maple Leafs (1931–32)	0–1–1
3	W	November 17, 1931	5–2	Montreal Maroons (1931–32)	1–1–1
4	W	November 21, 1931	3–0	Boston Bruins (1931–32)	2–1–1
5	L	November 24, 1931	1–7	@ Boston Bruins (1931–32)	2–2–1
6	W	November 26, 1931	3–2	Toronto Maple Leafs (1931–32)	3–2–1
7	L	November 29, 1931	2–3 OT	@ Detroit Falcons (1931–32)	3–3–1

December

Game	Result	Date	Score	Opponent	Record
8	L	December 2, 1931	1–2	@ Chicago Black Hawks (1931–32)	3–4–1
9	W	December 5, 1931	4–0	Detroit Falcons (1931–32)	4–4–1
10	T	December 8, 1931	1–1 OT	Chicago Black Hawks (1931–32)	4–4–2
11	W	December 10, 1931	3–0	@ New York Americans (1931–32)	5–4–2
12	L	December 12, 1931	1–7	@ Montreal Maroons (1931–32)	5–5–2
13	W	December 17, 1931	1–0	New York Americans (1931–32)	6–5–2
14	T	December 19, 1931	2–2 OT	New York Rangers (1931–32)	6–5–3
15	L	December 22, 1931	2–6	@ New York Rangers (1931–32)	6–6–3
16	L	December 24, 1931	1–2 OT	Toronto Maple Leafs (1931–32)	6–7–3
17	W	December 26, 1931	2–0 OT	@ Toronto Maple Leafs (1931–32)	7–7–3
18	L	December 31, 1931	0–5	@ Boston Bruins (1931–32)	7–8–3

January

Game	Result	Date	Score	Opponent	Record
19	W	January 2, 1932	5–1	Montreal Maroons (1931–32)	8–8–3
20	L	January 5, 1932	1–2 OT	New York Americans (1931–32)	8–9–3
21	L	January 7, 1932	0–1	@ New York Americans (1931–32)	8–10–3
22	L	January 10, 1932	1–3	@ Detroit Falcons (1931–32)	8–11–3
23	W	January 13, 1932	2–1	@ Chicago Black Hawks (1931–32)	9–11–3
24	T	January 16, 1932	2–2 OT	Boston Bruins (1931–32)	9–11–4
25	W	January 19, 1932	5–3	@ New York Rangers (1931–32)	10–11–4
26	W	January 21, 1932	3–1	Toronto Maple Leafs (1931–32)	11–11–4
27	L	January 23, 1932	0–2	@ Toronto Maple Leafs (1931–32)	11–12–4
28	L	January 26, 1932	2–3	@ New York Americans (1931–32)	11–13–4
29	T	January 28, 1932	3–3 OT	@ Montreal Maroons (1931–32)	11–13–5
30	W	January 30, 1932	4–3	Detroit Falcons (1931–32)	12–13–5

February

Game	Result	Date	Score	Opponent	Record
31	W	February 2, 1932	4–1	@ New York Rangers (1931–32)	13–13–5
32	W	February 4, 1932	6–5 OT	Montreal Maroons (1931–32)	14–13–5
33	L	February 9, 1932	1–4	@ Montreal Maroons (1931–32)	14–14–5
34	W	February 11, 1932	4–1	Chicago Black Hawks (1931–32)	15–14–5
35	W	February 13, 1932	3–1	New York Rangers (1931–32)	16–14–5
36	W	February 17, 1932	3–1	@ Chicago Black Hawks (1931–32)	17–14–5
37	T	February 21, 1932	1–1 OT	@ Detroit Falcons (1931–32)	17–14–6
38	W	February 23, 1932	2–1	Detroit Falcons (1931–32)	18–14–6
39	W	February 27, 1932	4–2	Boston Bruins (1931–32)	19–14–6

March

Game	Result	Date	Score	Opponent	Record
40	L	March 1, 1932	6–7	@ Boston Bruins (1931–32)	19–15–6
41	W	March 3, 1932	2–1	Montreal Maroons (1931–32)	20–15–6
42	T	March 5, 1932	1–1 OT	@ Toronto Maple Leafs (1931–32)	20–15–7
43	W	March 8, 1932	6–1	New York Americans (1931–32)	21–15–7
44	W	March 12, 1932	1–0	Chicago Black Hawks (1931–32)	22–15–7
45	L	March 15, 1932	2–5	@ New York Americans (1931–32)	22–16–7
46	W	March 17, 1932	10–4	New York Americans (1931–32)	23–16–7
47	W	March 19, 1932	6–4 OT	@ Montreal Maroons (1931–32)	24–16–7
48	W	March 22, 1932	4–2	Toronto Maple Leafs (1931–32)	25–16–7

Legend: Win (2 points) Loss (0 points) Tie (1 point)

== Playoffs ==
The Canadiens, by placing first, received a bye to the semi-finals where they met the New York Rangers, who had won the American Division. The Canadiens, missing some regulars due to injury, lost the best-of-five series three games to one.

=== New York Rangers vs. Montreal Canadiens ===
Date	Visitor	Home	Score	Record
March 24	New York Rangers	Montreal Canadiens	4–3	1–0
March 26	New York Rangers	Montreal Canadiens	3–4	1–1
March 27	Montreal Canadiens	New York Rangers	0–1	1–2
March 29	Montreal Canadiens	New York Rangers	2–5	1–3

== Player statistics ==
=== Regular season ===
==== Scoring ====
Player	Pos	GP	G	A	Pts	PIM
Howie Morenz	C	48	24	25	49	46
Aurel Joliat	LW	48	15	24	39	46
Johnny Gagnon	RW	48	19	18	37	40
Pit Lepine	C	48	19	11	30	42
Wildor Larochelle	RW	48	18	8	26	16
Armand Mondou	LW	47	6	12	18	22
Nick Wasnie	RW	48	10	2	12	16
Sylvio Mantha	D	47	5	5	10	62
Marty Burke	D	48	3	6	9	50
Albert Leduc	D	41	5	3	8	60
Georges Mantha	D/LW	48	1	7	8	8
Art Lesieur	D	24	1	2	3	12
Dunc Munro	D	48	1	1	2	14
Art Alexandre	LW	10	0	2	2	8
Gus Rivers	RW	25	1	0	1	4
George Hainsworth	G	48	0	0	0	2
Jean Pusie	D	1	0	0	0	0

==== Goaltending ====
Player	MIN	GP	W	L	T	GA	GAA	SO
George Hainsworth	2998	48	25	16	7	110	2.20	6
Albert Leduc	2	1	0	0	0	1	30.00	0
Team:	3000	48	25	16	7	111	2.22	6

=== Playoffs ===
==== Scoring ====
Player	Pos	GP	G	A	Pts	PIM
Wildor Larochelle	RW	4	2	1	3	4
Armand Mondou	LW	4	1	2	3	2
Aurel Joliat	LW	4	2	0	2	4
Johnny Gagnon	RW	4	1	1	2	4
Albert Leduc	D	4	1	1	2	2
Pit Lepine	C	3	1	0	1	4
Howie Morenz	C	4	1	0	1	4
Georges Mantha	D/LW	4	0	1	1	8
Sylvio Mantha	D	4	0	1	1	8
Art Alexandre	LW	4	0	0	0	0
Marty Burke	D	4	0	0	0	12
George Hainsworth	G	4	0	0	0	0
Art Lesieur	D	4	0	0	0	0
Dunc Munro	D	4	0	0	0	2
Nick Wasnie	RW	4	0	0	0	0

==== Goaltending ====
Player	MIN	GP	W	L	GA	GAA	SO
George Hainsworth	300	4	1	3	13	2.60	0
Team:	300	4	1	3	13	2.60	0

Note:

Pos = Position;GP = Games played; G = Goals; A = Assists; Pts = Points; PIM = Penalty minutes; +/- = Plus/minus; PPG = Power-play goals; SHG = Short-handed goals; GWG = Game-winning goals
Pos = Position;GP = Games played; Min, TOI = Minutes played; W = Wins; L = Losses; T,T/OT = Ties; OTL = Overtime losses; GA = Goals-against; GAA = Goals-against average; SO = Shutouts; SA = Shots against; SV = Shots saved;SV% = Save percentage;

== Awards and records ==
- O'Brien Cup – winners of Canadian Division
- Hart Trophy – Howie Morenz, most valuable player

== See also ==
- 1931–32 NHL season
