= 1931–32 Montreal Maroons season =

National Hockey League team season

1931–32 Montreal Maroons
- Division: 3rd Canadian
- 1931–32 record: 19–22–7
- Home record: 16–4–4
- Road record: 3–18–3
- Goals for: 142
- Goals against: 139

Team information
- Coach: Sprague Cleghorn
- Captain: Nels Stewart
- Arena: Montreal Forum

Team leaders
- Goals: Dave Trottier (26)
- Assists: Hooley Smith (33)
- Points: Hooley Smith; Dave Trottier (44)
- Penalty minutes: Dave Trottier (94)
- Wins: Flat Walsh (14)
- Goals against average: Flat Walsh (2.67)

The 1931–32 Montreal Maroons season was the eighth season for the National Hockey League (NHL) franchise.

== Regular season ==
=== Final standings ===
Canadian Division
	GP	W	L	T	GF	GA	PTS
**Montreal Canadiens**	48	25	16	7	128	111	57
**Toronto Maple Leafs**	48	23	18	7	155	127	53
**Montreal Maroons**	48	19	22	7	142	139	45
New York Americans	48	16	24	8	95	142	40

Note: W = Wins, L = Losses, T = Ties, GF = Goals For, GA = Goals Against, Pts = Points
Teams that qualified for the playoffs are highlighted in bold.

=== Record vs. opponents ===
==== Vs. Canadian Division ====
1931–32 NHL records
Team	**MTL**	**MTM**	**NYA**	**TOR**	**Total**
M. Canadiens	—	5–2–1	4–4	4–2–2	**13–8–3**
M. Maroons	2–5–1	—	4–3–1	3–5	**9–13–2**
N.Y. Americans	4–4	3–4–1	—	1–4–3	**8–12–4**
Toronto	2–4–2	5–3	4–1–3	—	**11–8–5**

==== Vs. American Division ====
1931–32 NHL records
Team	**BOS**	**CHI**	**DET**	**NYR**	**Total**
M. Canadiens	2–3–1	4–1–1	3–2–1	3–2–1	**12–8–4**
M. Maroons	4–1–1	1–2–3	3–3	2–3–1	**10–9–5**
N.Y. Americans	3–2–1	1–4–1	2–2–2	2–4	**8–12–4**
Toronto	3–2–1	2–3–1	3–3	4–2	**12–10–2**

== Schedule and results ==
1931–32 regular season
November

Game	Result	Date	Score	Opponent	Record
1	W	November 14, 1931	4–1	Boston Bruins (1931–32)	1–0–0
2	L	November 17, 1931	2–5	@ Montreal Canadiens (1931–32)	1–1–0
3	L	November 19, 1931	1–3 OT	@ Detroit Falcons (1931–32)	1–2–0
4	L	November 22, 1931	2–4	@ Chicago Black Hawks (1931–32)	1–3–0
5	W	November 24, 1931	6–1	Detroit Falcons (1931–32)	2–3–0
6	T	November 26, 1931	1–1 OT	@ New York Americans (1931–32)	2–3–1
7	L	November 28, 1931	1–3 OT	New York Americans (1931–32)	2–4–1

December

Game	Result	Date	Score	Opponent	Record
8	L	December 1, 1931	3–7	@ Boston Bruins (1931–32)	2–5–1
9	W	December 3, 1931	8–2	Toronto Maple Leafs (1931–32)	3–5–1
10	L	December 5, 1931	0–4	@ Toronto Maple Leafs (1931–32)	3–6–1
11	L	December 10, 1931	2–3	New York Rangers (1931–32)	3–7–1
12	W	December 12, 1931	7–1	Montreal Canadiens (1931–32)	4–7–1
13	L	December 17, 1931	4–5 OT	@ New York Rangers (1931–32)	4–8–1
14	L	December 19, 1931	2–4	@ Toronto Maple Leafs (1931–32)	4–9–1
15	T	December 22, 1931	1–1 OT	Chicago Black Hawks (1931–32)	4–9–2
16	T	December 26, 1931	4–4 OT	Boston Bruins (1931–32)	4–9–3
17	W	December 29, 1931	4–2	Detroit Falcons (1931–32)	5–9–3
18	L	December 31, 1931	1–3	@ Toronto Maple Leafs (1931–32)	5–10–3

January

Game	Result	Date	Score	Opponent	Record
19	L	January 2, 1932	1–5	@ Montreal Canadiens (1931–32)	5–11–3
20	L	January 5, 1932	0–2	@ New York Rangers (1931–32)	5–12–3
21	W	January 7, 1932	4–3	New York Rangers (1931–32)	6–12–3
22	W	January 9, 1932	4–2	New York Americans (1931–32)	7–12–3
23	L	January 12, 1932	0–2	@ New York Americans (1931–32)	7–13–3
24	L	January 14, 1932	4–6	Toronto Maple Leafs (1931–32)	7–14–3
25	T	January 17, 1932	3–3 OT	@ Chicago Black Hawks (1931–32)	7–14–4
26	L	January 21, 1932	3–4	@ Detroit Falcons (1931–32)	7–15–4
27	T	January 23, 1932	3–3 OT	Chicago Black Hawks (1931–32)	7–15–5
28	W	January 26, 1932	4–3	@ Boston Bruins (1931–32)	8–15–5
29	T	January 28, 1932	3–3 OT	Montreal Canadiens (1931–32)	8–15–6
30	L	January 31, 1932	2–4	@ New York Americans (1931–32)	8–16–6

February

Game	Result	Date	Score	Opponent	Record
31	W	February 2, 1932	4–3	Detroit Falcons (1931–32)	9–16–6
32	L	February 4, 1932	5–6 OT	@ Montreal Canadiens (1931–32)	9–17–6
33	W	February 6, 1932	3–1	New York Americans (1931–32)	10–17–6
34	W	February 9, 1932	4–1	Montreal Canadiens (1931–32)	11–17–6
35	W	February 11, 1932	7–4	@ Boston Bruins (1931–32)	12–17–6
36	L	February 13, 1932	0–6	@ Toronto Maple Leafs (1931–32)	12–18–6
37	W	February 16, 1932	7–1	New York Americans (1931–32)	13–18–6
38	W	February 18, 1932	3–1	@ New York Americans (1931–32)	14–18–6
39	W	February 20, 1932	3–0	Toronto Maple Leafs (1931–32)	15–18–6
40	L	February 24, 1932	1–3	@ Chicago Black Hawks (1931–32)	15–19–6
41	L	February 28, 1932	1–2	@ Detroit Falcons (1931–32)	15–20–6

March

Game	Result	Date	Score	Opponent	Record
42	W	March 1, 1932	1–0	Chicago Black Hawks (1931–32)	16–20–6
43	L	March 3, 1932	1–2	@ Montreal Canadiens (1931–32)	16–21–6
44	W	March 5, 1932	3–1	Boston Bruins (1931–32)	17–21–6
45	W	March 10, 1932	3–1	Toronto Maple Leafs (1931–32)	18–21–6
46	T	March 13, 1932	4–4 OT	@ New York Rangers (1931–32)	18–21–7
47	W	March 15, 1932	4–3	New York Rangers (1931–32)	19–21–7
48	L	March 19, 1932	4–6 OT	Montreal Canadiens (1931–32)	19–22–7

Legend: Win (2 points) Loss (0 points) Tie (1 point)

== Playoffs ==
They went against Detroit and won it 3 goals to 1, or 3–1. They went against Toronto in the second round and lost 4 goals to 3, or 3–4.

== Player statistics ==
=== Regular season ===
Scoring

Player	Pos	GP	G	A	Pts	PIM
Dave Trottier	LW	48	26	18	44	94
Hooley Smith	C/RW	43	11	33	44	49
Babe Siebert	LW/D	48	21	18	39	64
Jimmy Ward	RW	48	19	19	38	39
Nels Stewart	C	38	22	11	33	61
Baldy Northcott	D/LW	48	19	6	25	33
Glenn Brydson	RW	47	12	13	25	44
Lionel Conacher	D	45	7	9	16	60
Archie Wilcox	RW/D	48	3	3	6	37
Harold Starr	D	47	1	2	3	47
Earl Robinson	RW/C	26	0	3	3	2
Merlyn Phillips	C	46	1	1	2	11
John Gallagher	D	19	1	0	1	18
Paul Haynes	C	12	1	0	1	0
Lorne Duguid	LW	13	0	0	0	6
Jack McVicar	D	48	0	0	0	28
Normie Smith	G	21	0	0	0	0
Flat Walsh	G	27	0	0	0	0

Goaltending

Player	MIN	GP	W	L	T	GA	GAA	SO
Flat Walsh	1670	27	14	10	3	77	2.77	2
Normie Smith	1267	21	5	12	4	62	2.94	0
Harold Starr	3	1	0	0	0	0	0.00	0
Team:	2940	48	19	22	7	139	2.84	2

=== Playoffs ===
Scoring

Player	Pos	GP	G	A	Pts	PIM
Hooley Smith	C/RW	4	2	1	3	2
Jimmy Ward	RW	4	2	1	3	0
Baldy Northcott	D/LW	4	1	2	3	4
Dave Trottier	LW	4	1	0	1	0
Babe Siebert	LW/D	4	0	1	1	4
Nels Stewart	C	4	0	1	1	2
Glenn Brydson	RW	4	0	0	0	4
Lionel Conacher	D	4	0	0	0	2
Paul Haynes	C	4	0	0	0	0
Jack McVicar	D	4	0	0	0	0
Merlyn Phillips	C	4	0	0	0	2
Harold Starr	D	4	0	0	0	0
Flat Walsh	G	4	0	0	0	0
Archie Wilcox	RW/D	4	0	0	0	4

Goaltending

Player	MIN	GP	W	L	GA	GAA	SO
Flat Walsh	258	4	1	1	5	1.16	1
Team:	258	4	1	1	5	1.16	1

Note: GP = Games played; G = Goals; A = Assists; Pts = Points; +/- = Plus/minus; PIM = Penalty minutes; PPG = Power-play goals; SHG = Short-handed goals; GWG = Game-winning goals
MIN = Minutes played; W = Wins; L = Losses; T = Ties; GA = Goals against; GAA = Goals against average; SO = Shutouts;

== See also ==
- 1931–32 NHL season
