= 1931–32 New York Americans season =

National Hockey League team season

1931–32 New York Americans
- Division: 4th Canadian
- 1931–32 record: 16–24–8
- Home record: 9–9–6
- Road record: 7–15–2
- Goals for: 95
- Goals against: 142

Team information
- General manager: Eddie Gerard
- Coach: Eddie Gerard
- Captain: Billy Burch
- Arena: Madison Square Garden

Team leaders
- Goals: Joe Lamb (14)
- Assists: Norman Himes (14)
- Points: Norman Himes (28)
- Penalty minutes: Mervyn Dutton (109)
- Wins: Roy Worters (12)
- Goals against average: Jake Forbes (2.67)

The 1931–32 New York Americans season was the Americans' seventh season of play. The team again finished out of the playoffs, finishing fourth in the Canadian Division.

== Regular season ==
=== Final standings ===
Canadian Division
	GP	W	L	T	GF	GA	PTS
**Montreal Canadiens**	48	25	16	7	128	111	57
**Toronto Maple Leafs**	48	23	18	7	155	127	53
**Montreal Maroons**	48	19	22	7	142	139	45
New York Americans	48	16	24	8	95	142	40

Note: W = Wins, L = Losses, T = Ties, GF = Goals For, GA = Goals Against, Pts = Points
Teams that qualified for the playoffs are highlighted in bold.

=== Record vs. opponents ===
==== Vs. Canadian Division ====
1931–32 NHL records
Team	**MTL**	**MTM**	**NYA**	**TOR**	**Total**
M. Canadiens	—	5–2–1	4–4	4–2–2	**13–8–3**
M. Maroons	2–5–1	—	4–3–1	3–5	**9–13–2**
N.Y. Americans	4–4	3–4–1	—	1–4–3	**8–12–4**
Toronto	2–4–2	5–3	4–1–3	—	**11–8–5**

==== Vs. American Division ====
1931–32 NHL records
Team	**BOS**	**CHI**	**DET**	**NYR**	**Total**
M. Canadiens	2–3–1	4–1–1	3–2–1	3–2–1	**12–8–4**
M. Maroons	4–1–1	1–2–3	3–3	2–3–1	**10–9–5**
N.Y. Americans	3–2–1	1–4–1	2–2–2	2–4	**8–12–4**
Toronto	3–2–1	2–3–1	3–3	4–2	**12–10–2**

== Schedule and results ==
1931–32 regular season
November

Game	Result	Date	Score	Opponent	Record
1	W	November 12, 1931	5–2	@ Detroit Falcons (1931–32)	1–0–0
2	T	November 15, 1931	1–1 OT	@ Chicago Black Hawks (1931–32)	1–0–1
3	L	November 17, 1931	0–3	@ New York Rangers (1931–32)	1–1–1
4	W	November 22, 1931	2–1	Detroit Falcons (1931–32)	2–1–1
5	T	November 26, 1931	1–1 OT	Montreal Maroons (1931–32)	2–1–2
6	W	November 28, 1931	3–1 OT	@ Montreal Maroons (1931–32)	3–1–2

December

Game	Result	Date	Score	Opponent	Record
7	T	December 1, 1931	2–2 OT	@ Toronto Maple Leafs (1931–32)	3–1–3
8	W	December 6, 1931	2–0	Chicago Black Hawks (1931–32)	4–1–3
9	W	December 8, 1931	3–2	@ Boston Bruins (1931–32)	5–1–3
10	L	December 10, 1931	0–3	Montreal Canadiens (1931–32)	5–2–3
11	L	December 13, 1931	1–2	New York Rangers (1931–32)	5–3–3
12	T	December 15, 1931	2–2 OT	Toronto Maple Leafs (1931–32)	5–3–4
13	L	December 17, 1931	0–1	@ Montreal Canadiens (1931–32)	5–4–4
14	T	December 20, 1931	2–2 OT	Detroit Falcons (1931–32)	5–4–5
15	L	December 22, 1931	3–9	@ Toronto Maple Leafs (1931–32)	5–5–5
16	L	December 25, 1931	0–6	@ New York Rangers (1931–32)	5–6–5
17	L	December 27, 1931	0–1	@ Detroit Falcons (1931–32)	5–7–5
18	L	December 29, 1931	0–5	Toronto Maple Leafs (1931–32)	5–8–5

January

Game	Result	Date	Score	Opponent	Record
19	L	January 1, 1932	2–3	@ Chicago Black Hawks (1931–32)	5–9–5
20	T	January 3, 1932	0–0 OT	Boston Bruins (1931–32)	5–9–6
21	W	January 5, 1932	2–1 OT	@ Montreal Canadiens (1931–32)	6–9–6
22	W	January 7, 1932	1–0	Montreal Canadiens (1931–32)	7–9–6
23	L	January 9, 1932	2–4	@ Montreal Maroons (1931–32)	7–10–6
24	W	January 12, 1932	2–0	Montreal Maroons (1931–32)	8–10–6
25	W	January 17, 1932	4–0	Toronto Maple Leafs (1931–32)	9–10–6
26	L	January 19, 1932	3–11	@ Toronto Maple Leafs (1931–32)	9–11–6
27	L	January 21, 1932	0–1	Chicago Black Hawks (1931–32)	9–12–6
28	W	January 26, 1932	3–2	Montreal Canadiens (1931–32)	10–12–6
29	W	January 31, 1932	4–2	Montreal Maroons (1931–32)	11–12–6

February

Game	Result	Date	Score	Opponent	Record
30	W	February 2, 1932	4–3	@ Boston Bruins (1931–32)	12–12–6
31	L	February 4, 1932	0–5	Boston Bruins (1931–32)	12–13–6
32	L	February 6, 1932	1–3	@ Montreal Maroons (1931–32)	12–14–6
33	L	February 9, 1932	1–3	Chicago Black Hawks (1931–32)	12–15–6
34	L	February 14, 1932	1–3	Boston Bruins (1931–32)	12–16–6
35	L	February 16, 1932	1–7	@ Montreal Maroons (1931–32)	12–17–6
36	L	February 18, 1932	1–3	Montreal Maroons (1931–32)	12–18–6
37	W	February 21, 1932	3–2	@ New York Rangers (1931–32)	13–18–6
38	T	February 23, 1932	4–4 OT	Toronto Maple Leafs (1931–32)	13–18–7

March

Game	Result	Date	Score	Opponent	Record
39	L	March 1, 1932	1–3	@ Toronto Maple Leafs (1931–32)	13–19–7
40	L	March 4, 1932	1–6	@ Chicago Black Hawks (1931–32)	13–20–7
41	T	March 6, 1932	2–2 OT	Detroit Falcons (1931–32)	13–20–8
42	L	March 8, 1932	1–6	@ Montreal Canadiens (1931–32)	13–21–8
43	W	March 10, 1932	5–1	New York Rangers (1931–32)	14–21–8
44	L	March 13, 1932	0–1	@ Detroit Falcons (1931–32)	14–22–8
45	W	March 15, 1932	5–2	Montreal Canadiens (1931–32)	15–22–8
46	L	March 17, 1932	4–10	@ Montreal Canadiens (1931–32)	15–23–8
47	L	March 20, 1932	2–4	New York Rangers (1931–32)	15–24–8
48	W	March 22, 1932	8–6	@ Boston Bruins (1931–32)	16–24–8

Legend: Win (2 points) Loss (0 points) Tie (1 point)

== Player statistics ==
=== Regular season ===
Scoring

Player	GP	G	A	Pts	PIM
Normie Himes	48	7	21	28	9
Charley McVeigh	48	12	15	27	16
Joe Lamb	48	14	11	25	71
Billy Burch	48	7	15	22	20
Bert McInenly	30	12	6	18	44
Tommy Filmore	31	8	6	14	12
Wally Kilrea	48	3	8	11	18
Bill Brydge	48	2	8	10	77
John Keating	22	5	3	8	6
Red Dutton	47	3	5	8	107
George Patterson	20	6	0	6	26
Vern Ayres	45	2	4	6	82
Al Shields	48	4	1	5	45
Roy Burmister	16	3	2	5	2
Albert Hughes	18	1	1	2	8
George Massecar	14	1	1	2	12
Eddie Convey	21	1	0	1	21
Hap Emms	13	1	0	1	11
Johnny Sheppard	5	1	0	1	2
Eddie Jeremiah	9	0	1	1	0
Jake Forbes	6	0	0	0	0
Len Grosvenor	12	0	0	0	0
Dave Kerr	1	0	0	0	0
Moe Roberts	1	0	0	0	0
Hub Wilson	2	0	0	0	0
Roy Worters	40	0	0	0	0

Goaltending

Player	MIN	GP	W	L	T	GA	GAA	SA	SV	SV%	SO
Roy Worters	2459	40	12	20	8	110	2.68				5
Jake Forbes	360	6	3	3	0	16	2.67				0
Moe Roberts	60	1	1	0	0	1	1.00				0
Dave Kerr	60	1	0	1	0	6	6.00				0
Al Shields	41	2	0	0	0	9	13.17				0
Team:	2980	48	16	24	8	142	2.86				5

== See also ==
- 1931–32 NHL season
