= 1932 Stanley Cup Final =

1932 ice hockey championship series

	1	2	3	Total
Toronto Maple Leafs	6	6	6	3
New York Rangers	4	2	4	0
- Location(s): New York City: Madison Square Garden (1); Boston: Boston Garden (2); Toronto: Maple Leaf Gardens (3)
- Format: Best-of-five
- Coaches: Toronto: Dick Irvin; New York: Lester Patrick
- Captains: Toronto: Hap Day; New York: Bill Cook
- Dates: April 5–9, 1932
- Series-winning goal: Ace Bailey (15:07, third)
- Hall of Famers: Maple Leafs: Ace Bailey (1975); King Clancy (1958); Charlie Conacher (1961); Hap Day (1961); Red Horner (1965); Busher Jackson (1971); Joe Primeau (1963); Rangers: Frank Boucher (1958); Bill Cook (1952); Bun Cook (1995); Ching Johnson (1958); Earl Seibert (1963); Coaches: Dick Irvin (1958, player); Lester Patrick (1947, player)

The 1932 Stanley Cup Final was a best-of-five series between the New York Rangers and the Toronto Maple Leafs. Toronto would win the series in three straight to win their first Stanley Cup as the Maple Leafs.

Game two was moved from New York to Boston due to a scheduling conflict at Madison Square Garden. It remains the only neutral site Stanley Cup Finals game to be played in the United States and the first neutral site Stanley Cup Finals game contested by two NHL teams.

== Paths to the Finals ==
New York defeated the defending champion Canadiens in a best-of-five 3–1 to advance to the finals. The Leafs had to play two total-goals series; 6–2 against 1931 finalists Chicago, and 4–3 against the Maroons.

== Game summaries ==
New York would have to play game two in Boston, due to the circus having been booked into Madison Square Garden.

Toronto's 'Kid Line' of Jackson, Conacher and Primeau, in their first Finals, combined for eight goals.

Toronto's coach Dick Irvin made his second straight Finals appearance, having coached for Chicago in 1931.

April 5	Toronto Maple Leafs	6–4	New York Rangers	Madison Square Garden III	Recap
Hap Day (3) - 4:25		First period	17:25 - Bun Cook (3)
Busher Jackson (1) - 3:35; Busher Jackson (2) - 10:20; Charlie Conacher (4) - 10:50; Busher Jackson (3) - 17:05		Second period	18:20 - Cecil Dillon (2)
Red Horner (2) - 18:32		Third period	2:35 - Ching Johnson (2); 6:30 - Bun Cook (4)
Lorne Chabot		Goalie stats	John Ross Roach

April 7	Toronto Maple Leafs	6–2	New York Rangers	Boston Garden	Recap
No scoring		First period	3:53 - Bun Cook (5)
Busher Jackson (4) - 2:06; Charlie Conacher (5) - 8:58		Second period	1:00 - Doug Brennan (1)
King Clancy (1) - 1:49; Charlie Conacher (6) - 9:56; King Clancy (2) - 10:51; Baldy Cotton (2) - 17:10		Third period	No scoring
Lorne Chabot		Goalie stats	John Ross Roach

April 9	New York Rangers	4–6	Toronto Maple Leafs	Maple Leaf Gardens	Recap
No scoring		First period	5:39 - Andy Blair (1); 6:11 - Andy Blair (2)
Frank Boucher (1) - 15:24		Second period	10:57 - Busher Jackson (5)
Bun Cook (6) - 16:32; Frank Boucher (2) - 18:26; Frank Boucher (3) - 19:26		Third period	8:56 - Frank Finnigan (2); 15:07 - Ace Bailey (1); 17:36 - Bob Gracie (3)
John Ross Roach		Goalie stats	Lorne Chabot

Toronto won series 3–0

== Stanley Cup engraving ==
The 1932 Stanley Cup was presented to Maple Leafs captain Hap Day by NHL President Frank Calder following the Maple Leafs 6–4 win over the Rangers in game three.

The following Maple Leafs players and staff had their names engraved on the Stanley Cup

1931–32 Toronto Maple Leafs

=== Players ===
Centres

- 5 Andy Blair
- 10 Joe Primeau
- 14 Bob Gracie

Wingers

- 6 Irvine Ace Bailey
- 8 Harold Baldy Cotton
- 9 Charlie Conacher
- 11 Harvey Busher Jackson
- 12 Frank Finnigan*
- 15 Earl Miller*
- 16 Harold Hal Darragh*

Defencemen

- 2 Reginald Red Horner
- 3 Alex Levinsky
- 4 Clarence Hap Day (Captain)
- 7 Frank King Clancy
- 18 Fred Robertson*

Goaltenders

- 1 Lorne Chabot

=== Coaching and administrative staff ===
- Jack Bickell (President/Owner), Harry MacGee (Vice President/Owner)
- George Cortelle (Vice president/Owner), Ed Bickle (Vice President/Owner),
- Conn Smythe (Managing Director/Manager/Owner), Frank Selke Sr. (Publicity Director)
- Dick Irvin Sr. (Coach), Tim Daly (Trainer)
- Stafford Smythe (Mascot)
- John Aird*, John Edward Birks*, Albert Ellsworth†, George Goodenham*, Bob Laidlaw*,
- Leighton McCarty*, William MacBrien*, Fred Morrow*, John Murdoch*,
- Frank O'Connor*, Alfred Rogers*, Frank Ralph*, Victor Ross*, William Ross*,
- Horne Smith*, Sigmund Samuel*, John Tory* (Investors).

* Left off the newer ring.

=== Stanley Cup engraving ===
- Conn Smythe's son Stafford Smythe (who later served as president of the Toronto Maple Leafs from 1958 to 1970) is the youngest person to be engraved on the Stanley Cup, engraved in 1932 at age 11. His name was also engraved sideways on the original ring. It was engraved the correct way on the newer version.
- Conn Smythe was engraved twice, once as Conn Smythe, manager, and the other time as Conn Smythe, managing director. His name was only included once on the newer version of the Stanley Cup.
- Smythe wanted to include 17 investors on the Stanley Cup and playoff scores. To have enough room, five players' names were engraved by their last names only: Darragh, Finnigan, Gracie, Miller, Robertson. When the cup was redesigned during the 1957–58 season, the playoff game scores, 17 investors, and five players listed by only their last name were removed. Those five players played every playoff game and qualified to be on the cup. There was more than enough room to include the 5 missing players.

== See also ==
- 1931–32 NHL season

== Notes ==
Preceded by Montreal Canadiens; 1931	Toronto Maple Leafs; Stanley Cup champions 1932	Succeeded by New York Rangers; 1933
