= 1931–32 Toronto Maple Leafs season =

NHL hockey team season (won 3rd Stanley Cup)

1931–32 Toronto Maple Leafs
- Stanley Cup champions
- Division: 2nd Canadian
- 1931–32 record: 23–18–7
- Home record: 17–4–3
- Road record: 6–14–4
- Goals for: 155
- Goals against: 127

Team information
- General manager: Conn Smythe
- Coach: Art Duncan (0–3–2); Conn Smythe (1–0–0); Dick Irvin (22–15–5)
- Captain: Hap Day
- Arena: Maple Leaf Gardens

Team leaders
- Goals: Charlie Conacher (34)
- Assists: Joe Primeau (37)
- Points: Busher Jackson (53)
- Penalty minutes: Red Horner (97)
- Wins: Lorne Chabot (22)
- Goals against average: Lorne Chabot (2.36)

The 1931–32 Toronto Maple Leafs season was Toronto's 15th season in the NHL. Coming off their best regular season in team history in 1930–31, the club set team records in wins and points, with 23 and 53 respectively, finishing in second place in the Canadian Division and making the playoffs for the second year in a row for the first time since the 1920–21 and 1921–22 seasons. Toronto then won three playoff rounds to win the Stanley Cup, their first as the Maple Leafs, and third in the history of the franchise.

== Offseason ==
Prior to the season, the NHL announced that the schedule would increase from 44 games to 48. Also, the Maple Leafs announced they were moving from the Arena Gardens, which had been their home since entering the NHL in 1917, to the newly constructed Maple Leaf Gardens.

== Regular season ==
Toronto started the season off slowly, going win-less in their first five games, which cost head coach Art Duncan his job. He was replaced by former Chicago Black Hawks head coach Dick Irvin. Having to travel from his home in Winnipeg, Irvin joined the club for the December 1 game after Smythe coached the team to their first win of the season against the Boston Bruins. The hiring of Irvin would pay off immediately, as the Leafs got hot and had an 8–3–2 record in his first month behind the bench. The Leafs continued to play good hockey for the remainder of the season, finishing with a team record 23 victories, and tying the club record with 53 points. Toronto finished in second place in the Canadian Division, behind the Montreal Canadiens, and qualified for the playoffs for the second straight season.

The Leafs offense was led by Busher Jackson, who led the NHL with 53 points, scoring 28 goals and added 25 assists in 48 games. Linemate Joe Primeau led the league with 37 assists to finish second to Jackson in league scoring with 50 points. Charlie Conacher posted an NHL high 34 goals, and finished fourth in league scoring with 48 points. Defenceman King Clancy anchored the blueline, scoring 10 goals and 19 points, while Red Horner provided the team toughness, getting a club high 97 penalty minutes. In goal, Lorne Chabot had another very solid season, winning a team high 22 games while posting a 2.36 GAA and earning four shutouts along the way.

=== Maple Leaf Gardens ===
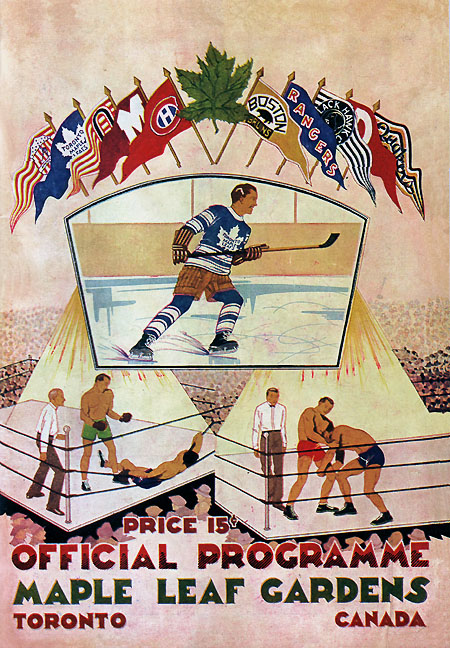
Toronto Maple Leafs opening night program at MLG, November 12, 1931

Overseen by Leafs managing director Conn Smythe, the new Maple Leaf Gardens was built in a six-month period during 1931 at a total cost of $1.5 million. The site was purchased from The T. Eaton Co. Ltd. for a price said to be $150,000 below market value. The building was designed by the architectural firm of Ross and Macdonald. Construction was partly funded through a public offering of 7% preferred shares in a new corporation "Maple Leaf Gardens Limited" at $10 each, with a free common share for each five preferred shares purchased. Smythe and the Toronto Maple Leaf Hockey Club Ltd. transferred ownership of the hockey team to the new corporation in return for shares.

The contract to construct the building was awarded to Thomson Brothers Construction of Port Credit in Toronto Township. Thomson Bros bid just under $990,000 for the project, the lowest of ten tenders received, mainly due to the fact that amongst the Thomson Brothers' various enterprises they had much of the sub contract work covered, others could not compete in this manner. That price did not include steel work, which was estimated at an additional $100,000. Construction began at midnight on June 1, 1931. In what is to this day considered to be an outstanding accomplishment, the Gardens was built in under five months and two weeks.

W. A. Hewitt, sports editor of the Toronto Star, was hired as general manager to oversee all events other than professional hockey. His son, Foster Hewitt, was hired to run the radio broadcasts.

The Gardens opened on November 12, 1931, with the Maple Leafs losing 2–1 to the Chicago Black Hawks. Reported attendance on opening night was 13,542. The Leafs would go on to win their first Stanley Cup (third of the Toronto franchise) that season.

=== Season standings ===
Canadian Division
	GP	W	L	T	GF	GA	PTS
**Montreal Canadiens**	48	25	16	7	128	111	57
**Toronto Maple Leafs**	48	23	18	7	155	127	53
**Montreal Maroons**	48	19	22	7	142	139	45
New York Americans	48	16	24	8	95	142	40

Note: W = Wins, L = Losses, T = Ties, GF = Goals For, GA = Goals Against, Pts = Points
Teams that qualified for the playoffs are highlighted in bold.

=== Record vs. opponents ===
==== Vs. Canadian Division ====
1931–32 NHL records
Team	MTL	MTM	NYA	TOR	Total
M. Canadiens	—	5–2–1	4–4	4–2–2	**13–8–3**
M. Maroons	2–5–1	—	4–3–1	3–5	**9–13–2**
N.Y. Americans	4–4	3–4–1	—	1–4–3	**8–12–4**
Toronto	2–4–2	5–3	4–1–3	—	**11–8–5**

==== Vs. American Division ====
1931–32 NHL records
Team	BOS	CHI	DET	NYR	Total
M. Canadiens	2–3–1	4–1–1	3–2–1	3–2–1	**12–8–4**
M. Maroons	4–1–1	1–2–3	3–3	2–3–1	**10–9–5**
N.Y. Americans	3–2–1	1–4–1	2–2–2	2–4	**8–12–4**
Toronto	3–2–1	2–3–1	3–3	4–2	**12–10–2**

== Playoffs ==
The Maple Leafs would open the playoffs against the Chicago Black Hawks in a two-game, total goal series. The Black Hawks had a record of 18–19–11, earning 47 points, and finished in second place in the American Division. The Leafs dropped the opening game by a close 1–0 score at Chicago Stadium, however, they returned home for the second game, and Toronto easily defeated the Black Hawks 6–1, and won the total goal series by a score of 6–2, advancing to the second round of the playoffs.

Toronto's next opponent was the Montreal Maroons in another two game, total goal series. The Maroons finished behind Toronto in the Canadian Division, as they finished with a 19–22–7 record, registering 43 points. The Maroons defeated the Detroit Falcons in the opening round of the playoffs. The series opened at the Montreal Forum, and the game ended in a 1–1 tie. The second game was played at Maple Leaf Gardens, and Toronto used home ice to their advantage, defeating the Maroons 3–2 in overtime to win the series 4–3, and move to the Stanley Cup finals.

The Leafs would play the New York Rangers in a best of 5 series to determine the winner of the 1932 Stanley Cup Finals. The Rangers finished in first place in the American Division with a 23–17–8 record, earning 54 points. They had defeated the Montreal Canadiens in four games to advance to the finals. The series opened at Madison Square Garden in New York, however, it was the Leafs who struck first, defeating the Rangers 6–4. The second game of the series was moved from New York to the Boston Garden due to the circus having been booked for the Rangers home arena. Toronto took full advantage of this, and easily defeated the Rangers 6–2 to come within a victory of the Stanley Cup. The series moved to Toronto for the third game, and Toronto completed the sweep, defeating New York 6–4, and winning their third Stanley Cup in team history, and first since 1922, when they were still named the Toronto St. Pats. The "Kid Line" of Jackson, Conacher, and Primeau combined for 8 goals in the 3 games.

== Schedule and results ==
=== Regular season ===
1931–32 regular season
November

Game	Date	Visitor	Score	Home	Record	Pts
1	November 12	Chicago Black Hawks	2–1	Toronto Maple Leafs	0–1–0	0
2	November 14	Montreal Canadiens	1–1	Toronto Maple Leafs	0–1–1	1
3	November 18	Toronto Maple Leafs	1–1	Chicago Black Hawks	0–1–2	2
4	November 21	New York Rangers	5–3	Toronto Maple Leafs	0–2–2	2
5	November 26	Toronto Maple Leafs	2–3	Montreal Canadiens	0–3–2	2
6	November 28	Boston Bruins	5–6	Toronto Maple Leafs	1–3–2	4

December

Game	Date	Visitor	Score	Home	Record	Pts
7	December 1	New York Americans	2–2	Toronto Maple Leafs	1–3–3	5
8	December 3	Toronto Maple Leafs	2–8	Montreal Maroons	1–4–3	5
9	December 5	Montreal Maroons	0–4	Toronto Maple Leafs	2–4–3	7
10	December 8	Toronto Maple Leafs	4–2	New York Rangers	3–4–3	9
11	December 12	Detroit Falcons	1–3	Toronto Maple Leafs	4–4–3	11
12	December 15	Toronto Maple Leafs	2–2	New York Americans	4–4–4	12
13	December 19	Montreal Maroons	2–4	Toronto Maple Leafs	5–4–4	14
14	December 20	Toronto Maple Leafs	0–1	Chicago Black Hawks	5–5–4	14
15	December 22	New York Americans	3–9	Toronto Maple Leafs	6–5–4	16
16	December 24	Toronto Maple Leafs	2–1	Montreal Canadiens	7–5–4	18
17	December 26	Montreal Canadiens	2–0	Toronto Maple Leafs	7–6–4	18
18	December 29	Toronto Maple Leafs	5–0	New York Americans	8–6–4	20
19	December 31	Montreal Maroons	1–3	Toronto Maple Leafs	9–6–4	22

January

Game	Date	Visitor	Score	Home	Record	Pts
20	January 3	Toronto Maple Leafs	2–3	Detroit Falcons	9–7–4	22
21	January 5	Toronto Maple Leafs	3–3	Boston Bruins	9–7–5	23
22	January 10	Toronto Maple Leafs	0–2	New York Rangers	9–8–5	23
23	January 12	Detroit Falcons	4–7	Toronto Maple Leafs	10–8–5	25
24	January 14	Toronto Maple Leafs	6–4	Montreal Maroons	11–8–5	27
25	January 17	Toronto Maple Leafs	0–4	New York Americans	11–9–5	27
26	January 19	New York Americans	3–11	Toronto Maple Leafs	12–9–5	29
27	January 21	Toronto Maple Leafs	1–3	Montreal Canadiens	12–10–5	29
28	January 23	Montreal Canadiens	0–2	Toronto Maple Leafs	13–10–5	31
29	January 30	New York Rangers	3–6	Toronto Maple Leafs	14–10–5	33

February

Game	Date	Visitor	Score	Home	Record	Pts
30	February 3	Toronto Maple Leafs	0–7	Chicago Black Hawks	14–11–5	33
31	February 6	Boston Bruins	0–6	Toronto Maple Leafs	15–11–5	35
32	February 7	Toronto Maple Leafs	1–3	Detroit Falcons	15–12–5	35
33	February 13	Montreal Maroons	0–6	Toronto Maple Leafs	16–12–5	37
34	February 16	Toronto Maple Leafs	0–3	Boston Bruins	16–13–5	37
35	February 18	New York Rangers	3–5	Toronto Maple Leafs	17–13–5	39
36	February 20	Toronto Maple Leafs	0–3	Montreal Maroons	17–14–5	39
37	February 23	Toronto Maple Leafs	4–4	New York Americans	17–14–6	40
38	February 25	Detroit Falcons	5–3	Toronto Maple Leafs	17–15–6	40
39	February 27	Chicago Black Hawks	2–4	Toronto Maple Leafs	18–15–6	42

March

Game	Date	Visitor	Score	Home	Record	Pts
40	March 1	New York Americans	1–3	Toronto Maple Leafs	19–15–6	44
41	March 5	Montreal Canadiens	1–1	Toronto Maple Leafs	19–15–7	45
42	March 10	Toronto Maple Leafs	1–3	Montreal Maroons	19–16–7	45
43	March 12	Boston Bruins	3–5	Toronto Maple Leafs	20–16–7	47
44	March 15	Toronto Maple Leafs	2–6	Boston Bruins	20–17–7	47
45	March 17	Toronto Maple Leafs	6–3	New York Rangers	21–17–7	49
46	March 19	Chicago Black Hawks	3–11	Toronto Maple Leafs	22–17–7	51
47	March 20	Toronto Maple Leafs	3–2	Detroit Falcons	23–17–7	53
48	March 22	Toronto Maple Leafs	2–4	Montreal Canadiens	23–18–7	53

Legend: Win (2 points) Loss (0 points) Tie (1 point)

=== Playoffs ===
1932 Stanley Cup playoffs
Quarterfinals vs. (A2) Chicago Black Hawks – Maple Leafs win 6 goals to 2 goals

Game	Date	Visitor	Score	Home	Series
1	March 27	Toronto Maple Leafs	0–1	Chicago Black Hawks	0–1
2	March 29	Chicago Black Hawks	1–6	Toronto Maple Leafs	1–1

Semifinals vs. (C3) Montreal Maroons – Maple Leafs win 4 goals to 3 goals

Game	Date	Visitor	Score	Home	Series
1	March 31	Toronto Maple Leafs	1–1	Montreal Maroons	0–0–1
2	April 2	Montreal Maroons	2–3	Toronto Maple Leafs	1–0–1

Stanley Cup Finals vs. (A1) New York Rangers – Maple Leafs win 3–0

Game	Date	Visitor	Score	Home	Series
1	April 5	Toronto Maple Leafs	6–4	New York Rangers	1–0
2^{[a]}	April 7	Toronto Maple Leafs	6–2	New York Rangers	2–0
3	April 9	New York Rangers	4–6	Toronto Maple Leafs	3–0
Notes:^{a} Game played in Boston.

Legend: Win Loss Tie

== Player statistics ==
=== Regular season ===
Scoring

Player	Pos	GP	G	A	Pts	PIM
Busher Jackson	LW	48	28	25	53	63
Joe Primeau	C	46	13	37	50	25
Charlie Conacher	RW	44	34	14	48	66
Andy Blair	C	48	9	14	23	35
Bob Gracie	C/LW	48	13	8	21	29
Frank Finnigan	RW	47	8	13	21	45
King Clancy	D	48	10	9	19	61
Baldy Cotton	LW	48	5	13	18	41
Red Horner	D	42	7	9	16	97
Hap Day	D	47	7	8	15	33
Harold Darragh	LW	48	5	10	15	6
Ace Bailey	RW	41	8	5	13	62
Alex Levinsky	D	47	5	5	10	29
Earl Miller	LW	15	3	3	6	10
Lorne Chabot	G	44	0	0	0	2
Benny Grant	G	5	0	0	0	0
Syd Howe	C/LW	3	0	0	0	0
Fred Robertson	D	8	0	0	0	23

Goaltending

Player	MIN	GP	W	L	T	GA	GAA	SO
Lorne Chabot	2698	44	22	16	6	106	2.36	4
Benny Grant	320	5	1	2	1	18	3.38	1
King Clancy	1	1	0	0	0	1	60.00	0
Red Horner	1	1	0	0	0	1	60.00	0
Alex Levinsky	1	1	0	0	0	1	60.00	0
Team:	3021	48	23	18	7	127	2.52	5

=== Playoffs ===
Scoring

Player	Pos	GP	G	A	Pts	PIM
Charlie Conacher	RW	7	6	2	8	6
Busher Jackson	LW	7	5	2	7	13
Hap Day	D	7	3	3	6	6
Joe Primeau	C	7	0	6	6	2
Frank Finnigan	RW	7	2	3	5	8
Bob Gracie	C/LW	7	3	1	4	0
Andy Blair	C	7	2	2	4	6
Baldy Cotton	LW	7	2	2	4	8
Red Horner	D	7	2	2	4	20
King Clancy	D	7	2	1	3	14
Ace Bailey	RW	7	1	0	1	4
Harold Darragh	LW	7	0	1	1	2
Lorne Chabot	G	7	0	0	0	0
Alex Levinsky	D	7	0	0	0	6
Earl Miller	LW	7	0	0	0	0
Fred Robertson	D	7	0	0	0	0

Goaltending

Player	MIN	GP	W	L	GA	GAA	SO
Lorne Chabot	438	7	5	1	15	2.05	0
Team:	438	7	5	1	15	2.05	0

Note:

Pos = Position;GP = Games played; G = Goals; A = Assists; Pts = Points; PIM = Penalty minutes; +/- = Plus/minus; PPG = Power-play goals; SHG = Short-handed goals; GWG = Game-winning goals
Pos = Position;GP = Games played; Min, TOI = Minutes played; W = Wins; L = Losses; T,T/OT = Ties; OTL = Overtime losses; GA = Goals-against; GAA = Goals-against average; SO = Shutouts; SA = Shots against; SV = Shots saved;SV% = Save percentage;

== Transactions ==
- June 8, 1931: Claimed Harold Darragh off Waivers from the Boston Bruins
- September 26, 1931: Claimed Frank Finnigan and Syd Howe in the dispersal draft from the Ottawa Senators for 1931–32 season
- February 8, 1932: Acquired Earl Miller from the Chicago Black Hawks for cash
- February 14, 1932: Signed Free Agent Fred Robertson

== See also ==
- 1931–32 NHL season
