= 1931–32 Detroit Falcons season =

Sports season

1931–32 Detroit Falcons
- Division: 3rd American
- 1931–32 record: 18–20–10
- Home record: 15–3–6
- Road record: 3–17–4
- Goals for: 95
- Goals against: 108

Team information
- General manager: Jack Adams
- Coach: Jack Adams
- Captain: Carson Cooper
- Arena: Detroit Olympia

Team leaders
- Goals: Ebbie Goodfellow (14)
- Assists: Ebbie Goodfellow (16)
- Points: Ebbie Goodfellow (30)
- Penalty minutes: Reg Noble (72)
- Wins: Alec Connell (18)
- Goals against average: Alec Connell (2.13)

The 1931–32 Detroit Falcons season was the sixth season of the Detroit franchise in the National Hockey League (NHL). The Falcons placed third in the American Division to qualify for the playoffs. The Falcons lost a two-game total-goals playoff to the Montreal Maroons.

== Regular season ==
=== Final standings ===
American Division
	GP	W	L	T	GF	GA	PTS
**New York Rangers**	48	23	17	8	134	112	54
**Chicago Black Hawks**	48	18	19	11	86	101	47
**Detroit Falcons**	48	18	20	10	95	108	46
Boston Bruins	48	15	21	12	122	117	42

Note: GP = Games Played, W = Wins, L = Losses, T = Ties, Pts = Points, GF = Goals For, GA = Goals Against
Teams that qualified for the playoffs are highlighted in bold.

=== Record vs. opponents ===
==== Vs. American Division ====
1931–32 NHL records
Team	**BOS**	**CHI**	**DET**	**NYR**	**Total**
Boston	—	2–4–2	3–1–4	2–4–2	**7–9–8**
Chicago	4–2–2	—	3–4–1	1–5–2	**8–11–5**
Detroit	1–3–4	4–3–1	—	3–3–2	**8–9–7**
N.Y. Rangers	4–2–2	5–1–2	3–3–2	—	**12–6–6**

==== Vs. Canadian Division ====
1931–32 NHL records
Team	**MTL**	**MTM**	**NYA**	**TOR**	**Total**
Boston	3–2–1	1–4–1	2–3–1	2–3–1	**8–12–4**
Chicago	1–4–1	2–1–3	4–1–1	3–2–1	**10–8–6**
Detroit	2–3–1	3–3	2–2–2	3–3	**10–11–3**
N.Y. Rangers	2–3–1	3–2–1	4–2	2–4	**11–11–2**

== Schedule and results ==
1931–32 regular season
November

Game	Result	Date	Score	Opponent	Record
1	L	November 12, 1931	2–5	New York Americans (1931–32)	0–1–0
2	W	November 15, 1931	2–1	@ New York Rangers (1931–32)	1–1–0
3	L	November 17, 1931	0–1 OT	@ Boston Bruins (1931–32)	1–2–0
4	W	November 19, 1931	3–1 OT	Montreal Maroons (1931–32)	2–2–0
5	L	November 22, 1931	1–2	@ New York Americans (1931–32)	2–3–0
6	L	November 24, 1931	1–6	@ Montreal Maroons (1931–32)	2–4–0
7	W	November 29, 1931	3–2 OT	Montreal Canadiens (1931–32)	3–4–0

December

Game	Result	Date	Score	Opponent	Record
8	T	December 3, 1931	1–1 OT	New York Rangers (1931–32)	3–4–1
9	L	December 5, 1931	0–4	@ Montreal Canadiens (1931–32)	3–5–1
10	T	December 10, 1931	1–1 OT	Boston Bruins (1931–32)	3–5–2
11	L	December 12, 1931	1–3	@ Toronto Maple Leafs (1931–32)	3–6–2
12	L	December 16, 1931	1–4 OT	@ Chicago Black Hawks (1931–32)	3–7–2
13	W	December 17, 1931	4–1	Chicago Black Hawks (1931–32)	4–7–2
14	T	December 20, 1931	2–2 OT	@ New York Americans (1931–32)	4–7–3
15	L	December 22, 1931	2–6	@ Boston Bruins (1931–32)	4–8–3
16	W	December 27, 1931	1–0	New York Americans (1931–32)	5–8–3
17	L	December 29, 1931	2–4	@ Montreal Maroons (1931–32)	5–9–3

January

Game	Result	Date	Score	Opponent	Record
18	L	January 1, 1932	0–3	@ New York Rangers (1931–32)	5–10–3
19	W	January 3, 1932	3–2 OT	Toronto Maple Leafs (1931–32)	6–10–3
20	L	January 6, 1932	2–4	@ Chicago Black Hawks (1931–32)	6–11–3
21	T	January 7, 1932	0–0 OT	Boston Bruins (1931–32)	6–11–4
22	W	January 10, 1932	3–1	Montreal Canadiens (1931–32)	7–11–4
23	L	January 12, 1932	4–7	@ Toronto Maple Leafs (1931–32)	7–12–4
24	W	January 14, 1932	2–0	Chicago Black Hawks (1931–32)	8–12–4
25	W	January 17, 1932	4–2	New York Rangers (1931–32)	9–12–4
26	W	January 21, 1932	4–3	Montreal Maroons (1931–32)	10–12–4
27	W	January 23, 1932	2–0	@ Boston Bruins (1931–32)	11–12–4
28	L	January 24, 1932	3–4 OT	@ New York Rangers (1931–32)	11–13–4
29	L	January 27, 1932	1–2 OT	@ Chicago Black Hawks (1931–32)	11–14–4
30	W	January 28, 1932	4–2	Chicago Black Hawks (1931–32)	12–14–4
31	L	January 30, 1932	3–4	@ Montreal Canadiens (1931–32)	12–15–4

February

Game	Result	Date	Score	Opponent	Record
32	L	February 2, 1932	3–4	@ Montreal Maroons (1931–32)	12–16–4
33	W	February 7, 1932	3–1	Toronto Maple Leafs (1931–32)	13–16–4
34	W	February 14, 1932	3–1	Chicago Black Hawks (1931–32)	14–16–4
35	T	February 16, 1932	2–2 OT	@ New York Rangers (1931–32)	14–16–5
36	T	February 18, 1932	0–0 OT	Boston Bruins (1931–32)	14–16–6
37	T	February 21, 1932	1–1 OT	Montreal Canadiens (1931–32)	14–16–7
38	L	February 23, 1932	1–2	@ Montreal Canadiens (1931–32)	14–17–7
39	W	February 25, 1932	5–3	@ Toronto Maple Leafs (1931–32)	15–17–7
40	W	February 28, 1932	2–1	Montreal Maroons (1931–32)	16–17–7

March

Game	Result	Date	Score	Opponent	Record
41	L	March 3, 1932	1–2	New York Rangers (1931–32)	16–18–7
42	T	March 6, 1932	2–2 OT	@ New York Americans (1931–32)	16–18–8
43	L	March 8, 1932	0–2	@ Boston Bruins (1931–32)	16–19–8
44	W	March 13, 1932	1–0	New York Americans (1931–32)	17–19–8
45	T	March 16, 1932	1–1 OT	@ Chicago Black Hawks (1931–32)	17–19–9
46	T	March 18, 1932	1–1 OT	Boston Bruins (1931–32)	17–19–10
47	L	March 20, 1932	2–3	Toronto Maple Leafs (1931–32)	17–20–10
48	W	March 22, 1932	5–4	New York Rangers (1931–32)	18–20–10

Legend: Win (2 points) Loss (0 points) Tie (1 point)

== Playoffs ==
=== (C3) Montreal Maroons vs. (A3) Detroit Falcons ===
Detroit Falcons vs Montreal Maroons
Date	Visitors	Score	Home	Score
Mar 27	Montreal M.	1	Detroit	1
Mar 29	Detroit	0	Montreal M.	2

Montreal M. wins a total goal series 3 goals to 1.

== Player statistics ==
=== Regular season ===
Scoring

Player	Pos	GP	G	A	Pts	PIM
Ebbie Goodfellow	C/D	48	14	16	30	56
Frank Carson	RW	31	10	14	24	31
Larry Aurie	RW	48	12	8	20	18
Herbie Lewis	LW	48	5	14	19	21
Hec Kilrea	LW	47	13	3	16	28
Alex Smith	D	48	6	8	14	47
Hap Emms	LW/D	20	5	9	14	27
John Sorrell	LW	48	8	5	13	22
Doug Young	D	47	10	2	12	45
Danny Cox	LW	47	4	6	10	23
Carson Cooper	RW	48	3	5	8	11
Reg Noble	C/D	48	3	3	6	72
Art Gagne	RW	13	1	1	2	0
Bert McInenly	LW/D	17	0	1	1	16
Alec Connell	G	48	0	0	0	0
Tommy Filmore	RW	9	0	0	0	2

Goaltending

Player	MIN	GP	W	L	T	GA	GAA	SO
Alec Connell	3050	48	18	20	10	108	2.12	6
Team:	3050	48	18	20	10	108	2.12	6

=== Playoffs ===
Scoring

Player	Pos	GP	G	A	Pts	PIM
John Sorrell	LW	2	1	0	1	0
Larry Aurie	RW	2	0	0	0	0
Frank Carson	RW	2	0	0	0	2
Alec Connell	G	2	0	0	0	0
Carson Cooper	RW	2	0	0	0	0
Danny Cox	LW	2	0	0	0	2
Hap Emms	LW/D	2	0	0	0	2
Ebbie Goodfellow	C/D	2	0	0	0	0
Hec Kilrea	LW	2	0	0	0	0
Herbie Lewis	LW	2	0	0	0	0
Reg Noble	C/D	2	0	0	0	0
Alex Smith	D	2	0	0	0	4
Doug Young	D	2	0	0	0	2

Goaltending

Player	MIN	GP	W	L	GA	GAA	SO
Alec Connell	120	2	0	1	3	1.50	0
Team:	120	2	0	1	3	1.50	0

Note: GP = Games played; G = Goals; A = Assists; Pts = Points; +/- = Plus-minus PIM = Penalty minutes; PPG = Power-play goals; SHG = Short-handed goals; GWG = Game-winning goals;
MIN = Minutes played; W = Wins; L = Losses; T = Ties; GA = Goals against; GAA = Goals-against average; SO = Shutouts;

== See also ==
- 1931–32 NHL season
