= 1931–32 Boston Bruins season =

NHL team season

1931–32 Boston Bruins
- Division: 4th American
- 1931–32 record: 15–21–12
- Home record: 11–10–3
- Road record: 4–11–9
- Goals for: 122
- Goals against: 117

Team information
- General manager: Art Ross
- Coach: Art Ross
- Captain: George Owen
- Arena: Boston Garden

Team leaders
- Goals: Marty Barry (21)
- Assists: Dit Clapper (22)
- Points: Dit Clapper (39)
- Penalty minutes: Eddie Shore (80)
- Wins: Tiny Thompson (13)
- Goals against average: Tiny Thompson (2.29)

The 1931–32 Boston Bruins season was the Bruins' eighth season in the NHL. The team finished fourth in the division, out of the playoffs for the first time since the 1925–26 season.

== Regular season ==
In the course of playing a 0–0 tie against the New York Americans on January 3, 1932, the Bruins shot the puck the length of the ice 87 times to relieve pressure on their goal. To stop this becoming a regular tactic, the icing rule was introduced into the NHL later in the decade.

=== Final standings ===
American Division
	GP	W	L	T	GF	GA	PTS
**New York Rangers**	48	23	17	8	134	112	54
**Chicago Black Hawks**	48	18	19	11	86	101	47
**Detroit Falcons**	48	18	20	10	95	108	46
Boston Bruins	48	15	21	12	122	117	42

Note: GP = Games Played, W = Wins, L = Losses, T = Ties, Pts = Points, GF = Goals For, GA = Goals Against
Teams that qualified for the playoffs are highlighted in bold.

=== Record vs. opponents ===
==== Vs. American Division ====
1931–32 NHL records
Team	BOS	CHI	DET	NYR	Total
Boston	—	2–4–2	3–1–4	2–4–2	**7–9–8**
Chicago	4–2–2	—	3–4–1	1–5–2	**8–11–5**
Detroit	1–3–4	4–3–1	—	3–3–2	**8–9–7**
N.Y. Rangers	4–2–2	5–1–2	3–3–2	—	**12–6–6**

==== Vs. Canadian Division ====
1931–32 NHL records
Team	MTL	MTM	NYA	TOR	Total
Boston	3–2–1	1–4–1	2–3–1	2–3–1	**8–12–4**
Chicago	1–4–1	2–1–3	4–1–1	3–2–1	**10–8–6**
Detroit	2–3–1	3–3	2–2–2	3–3	**10–11–3**
N.Y. Rangers	2–3–1	3–2–1	4–2	2–4	**11–11–2**

== Schedule and results ==
1931–32 regular season
November

Game	Result	Date	Score	Opponent	Record
1	L	November 14, 1931	1–4	@ Montreal Maroons (1931–32)	0–1–0
2	W	November 17, 1931	1–0 OT	Detroit Falcons (1931–32)	1–1–0
3	L	November 19, 1931	1–2	@ New York Rangers (1931–32)	1–2–0
4	L	November 21, 1931	0–3	@ Montreal Canadiens (1931–32)	1–3–0
5	W	November 24, 1931	7–1	Montreal Canadiens (1931–32)	2–3–0
6	W	November 26, 1931	1–0	Chicago Black Hawks (1931–32)	3–3–0
7	L	November 28, 1931	5–6 OT	@ Toronto Maple Leafs (1931–32)	3–4–0

December

Game	Result	Date	Score	Opponent	Record
8	W	December 1, 1931	7–3	Montreal Maroons (1931–32)	4–4–0
9	L	December 8, 1931	2–3	New York Americans (1931–32)	4–5–0
10	T	December 10, 1931	1–1 OT	@ Detroit Falcons (1931–32)	4–5–1
11	W	December 13, 1931	3–0	@ Chicago Black Hawks (1931–32)	5–5–1
12	T	December 15, 1931	2–2 OT	New York Rangers (1931–32)	5–5–2
13	W	December 22, 1931	6–2	Detroit Falcons (1931–32)	6–5–2
14	T	December 26, 1931	4–4 OT	@ Montreal Maroons (1931–32)	6–5–3
15	T	December 29, 1931	3–3 OT	Chicago Black Hawks (1931–32)	6–5–4
16	W	December 31, 1931	5–0	Montreal Canadiens (1931–32)	7–5–4

January

Game	Result	Date	Score	Opponent	Record
17	T	January 3, 1932	0–0 OT	@ New York Americans (1931–32)	7–5–5
18	T	January 5, 1932	3–3 OT	Toronto Maple Leafs (1931–32)	7–5–6
19	T	January 7, 1932	0–0 OT	@ Detroit Falcons (1931–32)	7–5–7
20	T	January 10, 1932	1–1 OT	@ Chicago Black Hawks (1931–32)	7–5–8
21	L	January 12, 1932	3–5 OT	New York Rangers (1931–32)	7–6–8
22	L	January 14, 1932	1–3	@ New York Rangers (1931–32)	7–7–8
23	T	January 16, 1932	2–2 OT	@ Montreal Canadiens (1931–32)	7–7–9
24	L	January 19, 1932	2–3	Chicago Black Hawks (1931–32)	7–8–9
25	L	January 23, 1932	0–2	Detroit Falcons (1931–32)	7–9–9
26	L	January 26, 1932	3–4	Montreal Maroons (1931–32)	7–10–9
27	W	January 28, 1932	4–1	@ New York Rangers (1931–32)	8–10–9

February

Game	Result	Date	Score	Opponent	Record
28	L	February 2, 1932	3–4	New York Americans (1931–32)	8–11–9
29	W	February 4, 1932	5–0	@ New York Americans (1931–32)	9–11–9
30	L	February 6, 1932	0–6	@ Toronto Maple Leafs (1931–32)	9–12–9
31	W	February 9, 1932	2–1	New York Rangers (1931–32)	10–12–9
32	L	February 11, 1932	4–7	Montreal Maroons (1931–32)	10–13–9
33	W	February 14, 1932	3–1	@ New York Americans (1931–32)	11–13–9
34	W	February 16, 1932	3–0	Toronto Maple Leafs (1931–32)	12–13–9
35	T	February 18, 1932	0–0 OT	@ Detroit Falcons (1931–32)	12–13–10
36	L	February 20, 1932	1–2	@ Chicago Black Hawks (1931–32)	12–14–10
37	L	February 23, 1932	0–2 OT	New York Rangers (1931–32)	12–15–10
38	T	February 25, 1932	3–3 OT	@ New York Rangers (1931–32)	12–15–11
39	L	February 27, 1932	2–4	@ Montreal Canadiens (1931–32)	12–16–11

March

Game	Result	Date	Score	Opponent	Record
40	W	March 1, 1932	7–6	Montreal Canadiens (1931–32)	13–16–11
41	L	March 5, 1932	1–3	@ Montreal Maroons (1931–32)	13–17–11
42	W	March 8, 1932	2–0	Detroit Falcons (1931–32)	14–17–11
43	L	March 10, 1932	2–3	Chicago Black Hawks (1931–32)	14–18–11
44	L	March 12, 1932	3–5 OT	@ Toronto Maple Leafs (1931–32)	14–19–11
45	W	March 15, 1932	6–2	Toronto Maple Leafs (1931–32)	15–19–11
46	T	March 18, 1932	1–1 OT	@ Detroit Falcons (1931–32)	15–19–12
47	L	March 20, 1932	0–1	@ Chicago Black Hawks (1931–32)	15–20–12
48	L	March 22, 1932	6–8	New York Americans (1931–32)	15–21–12

Legend: Win (2 points) Loss (0 points) Tie (1 point)

== Player statistics ==
=== Regular season ===
Scoring

Player	Pos	GP	G	A	Pts	PIM
Dit Clapper	RW/D	48	17	22	39	21
Marty Barry	C	48	21	17	38	22
Cooney Weiland	C	46	14	12	26	20
Art Chapman	C	48	11	14	25	18
George Owen	D	42	12	10	22	29
Eddie Shore	D	45	9	13	22	80
Harry Oliver	RW	44	13	7	20	22
Bill Touhey	LW	26	5	4	9	12
Frank Jerwa	LW/D	24	4	5	9	14
Bud Cook	C	28	4	4	8	14
Lionel Hitchman	D	48	4	3	7	36
Eddie Burke	RW/C	16	3	0	3	12
Irwin Boyd	RW	29	2	1	3	10
Percy Galbraith	LW/D	47	2	1	3	28
Yip Foster	D	34	1	2	3	12
Lloyd Klein	LW	5	1	0	1	0
Paul Runge	C/LW	14	0	1	1	8
Red Beattie	LW	1	0	0	0	0
Wilf Cude	G	2	0	0	0	0
Percy Jackson	G	4	0	0	0	0
Eddie Jeremiah	RW/D	6	0	0	0	0
Joe Jerwa	D	11	0	0	0	8
Jack Pratt	C/D	5	0	0	0	6
Max Sutherland	LW	2	0	0	0	0
Tiny Thompson	G	43	0	0	0	0

Goaltending

Player	MIN	GP	W	L	T	GA	GAA	SO
Tiny Thompson	2698	43	13	19	11	103	2.29	9
Wilf Cude	120	2	1	1	0	6	3.00	1
Percy Jackson	232	4	1	1	1	8	2.07	0
Team:	3050	48	15	21	12	117	2.30	10

Note:

Pos = Position;GP = Games played; G = Goals; A = Assists; Pts = Points; PIM = Penalty minutes; +/- = Plus/minus; PPG = Power-play goals; SHG = Short-handed goals; GWG = Game-winning goals
Pos = Position;GP = Games played; Min, TOI = Minutes played; W = Wins; L = Losses; T,T/OT = Ties; OTL = Overtime losses; GA = Goals-against; GAA = Goals-against average; SO = Shutouts; SA = Shots against; SV = Shots saved;SV% = Save percentage;

== See also ==
- 1931–32 NHL season
