= List of Montreal Maroons seasons =

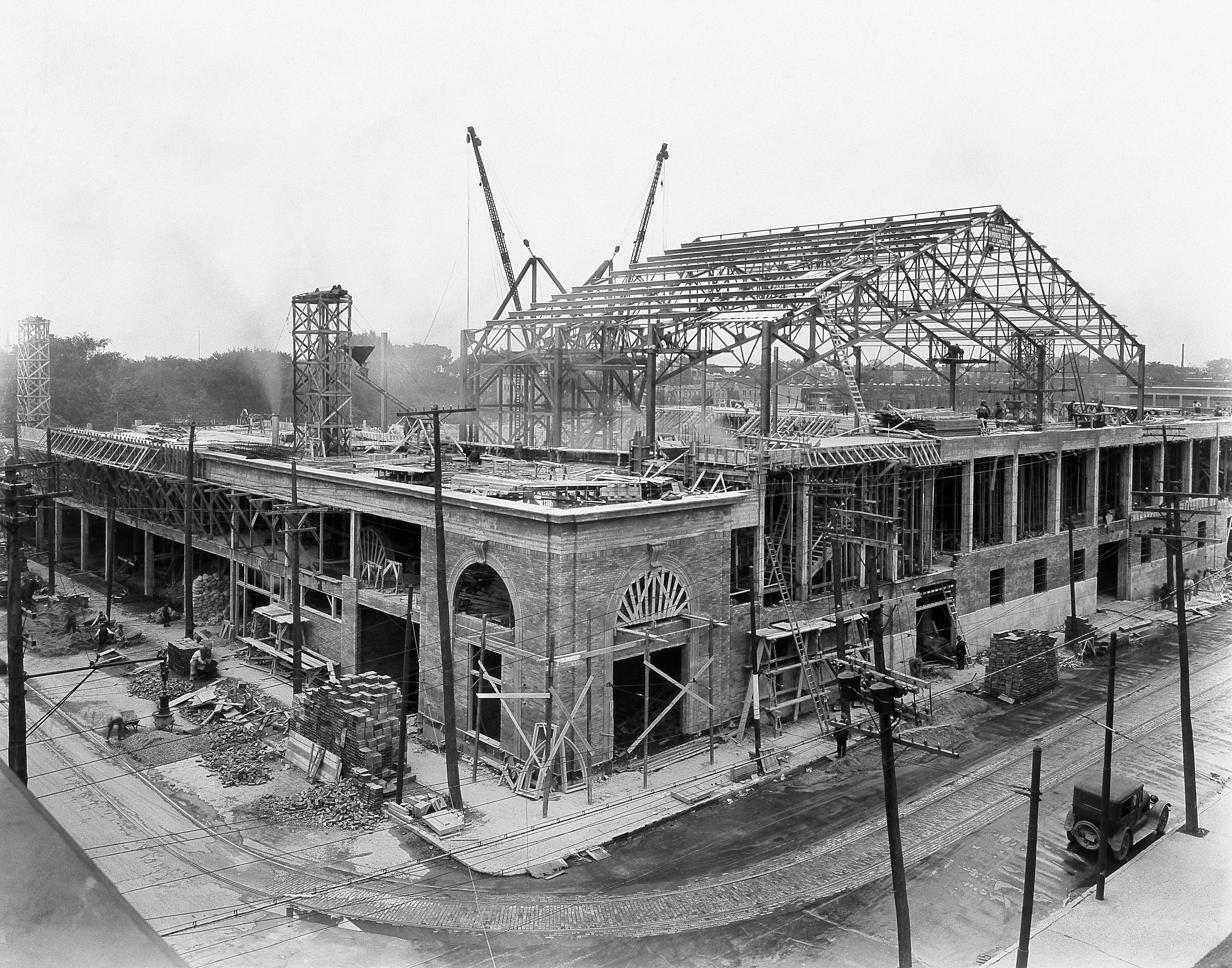
The Montreal Forum, built in 1924 as the home rink of both the Montreal Maroons and the Montreal Canadiens.

The Montreal Maroons were a Canadian ice hockey team based in Montreal, Quebec. The team was a member of the Canadian Division of the National Hockey League (NHL).

== Table key ==
Key of terms and abbreviations
Term or abbreviation	Definition
Finish	Final position in division or league standings
GP	Number of games played
W	Number of wins
L	Number of losses
T	Number of ties
Pts	Number of points
GF	Goals for (goals scored by the Rangers)
GA	Goals against (goals scored by the Rangers' opponents)
—	Does not apply
TG	Two-game total goals series

== Year by year ==
Stanley Cup champions †	Division champions ^

NHL season	Maroons season	Division	Regular season								Postseason						
NHL season	Maroons season	Division	Finish	GP	W	L	T	Pts	GF	GA	GP	W	L	T	GF	GA	Result
1924–25	1924–25	—	5th	30	9	19	2	20	45	65	—	—	—	—	—	—	Did not qualify
1925–26	1925–26	—	2nd	36	20	11	5	45	91	73	8 (Note: Postseason statistics and results for the 1925–26 season include the 1926 Stanley Cup Final which were contested by the NHL champion Maroons and Western Hockey League champion Victoria Cougars. These numbers are also included in the overall totals at the bottom of the table.)	5	1	2	18	8	Won semifinals vs Pittsburgh Pirates, 6–4 (TG); Won NHL Final vs. Ottawa Senators, 2–1 (TG); Won Stanley Cup Final vs. Victoria Cougars, 3–1†
1926–27	1926–27	Canadian	3rd	44	20	20	4	44	71	68	2	0	1	1	1	2	Lost quarterfinals to Montreal Canadiens, 2–1 (TG)
1927–28	1927–28	Canadian	2nd	44	24	14	6	54	96	77	9	5	3	1	12	8	Won quarterfinals vs. Ottawa Senators, 3–1 (TG); Won semifinals vs. Montreal Canadiens, 3–2 (TG); Lost Stanley Cup Final to New York Rangers, 3–2
1928–29	1928–29	Canadian	5th	44	15	20	9	39	67	65	—	—	—	—	—	—	Did not qualify
1929–30	1929–30	Canadian^{^}	1st	44	23	16	5	51	141	114	4	1	3	—	5	11	Lost semifinals to Boston Bruins, 3–1
1930–31	1930–31	Canadian	3rd	44	20	18	6	46	105	106	2	0	2	0	1	8	Lost quarterfinals to New York Rangers, 8–1 (TG)
1931–32	1931–32	Canadian	3rd	48	19	22	7	45	142	139	4	1	1	2	6	5	Won quarterfinals vs. Detroit Falcons, 3–1 (TG); Lost semifinals to Toronto Maple Leafs, 4–3 (TG)
1932–33	1932–33	Canadian	2nd	48	22	20	6	50	135	119	2	0	2	0	2	5	Lost quarterfinals to Detroit Red Wings, 5–2 (TG)
1933–34	1933–34	Canadian	3rd	48	19	18	11	49	117	122	4	1	2	1	4	7	Won quarterfinals vs. New York Rangers, 2–1 (TG); Lost semifinals to Chicago Black Hawks, 6–2 (TG)
1934–35	1934–35	Canadian	2nd	48	24	19	5	53	123	92	7	5	0	2	16	8	Won quarterfinals vs. Chicago Black Hawks, 1–0 (TG); Won semifinals vs. New York Rangers, 5–4 (TG); Won Stanley Cup Final vs. Toronto Maple Leafs, 3–0†
1935–36	1935–36	Canadian^{^}	1st	48	22	16	10	54	114	106	3	0	3	—	1	6	Lost semifinals to Detroit Red Wings, 3–0
1936–37	1936–37	Canadian	2nd	48	22	17	9	53	126	110	5	2	3	—	8	11	Won quarterfinals vs. Boston Bruins, 2–1; Lost semifinals to New York Rangers, 2–0
1937–38	1937–38	Canadian	4th	48	12	30	6	30	101	149	—	—	—	—	—	—	Did not qualify
Totals				622	271	260	91	633	1474	1405	50^{[a]}	20	21	9	74	79	

== See also ==
- List of NHL seasons
