= 1931–32 Chicago Black Hawks season =

NHL ice hockey team season

1931–32 Chicago Black Hawks
- Division: 2nd American
- 1931–32 record: 18–19–11
- Home record: 13–5–6
- Road record: 5–14–5
- Goals for: 86
- Goals against: 101

Team information
- General manager: Frederic McLaughlin
- Coach: Bill Tobin
- Captain: Cy Wentworth
- Arena: Chicago Stadium

Team leaders
- Goals: Johnny Gottselig (13)
- Assists: Johnny Gottselig (15)
- Points: Johnny Gottselig (28)
- Penalty minutes: Mush March (59)
- Wins: Chuck Gardiner (18)
- Goals against average: Chuck Gardiner (1.85)

The 1931–32 Chicago Black Hawks season was the team's sixth season in the NHL, and they were coming off of their first ever Stanley Cup finals appearance, as they lost to the Montreal Canadiens in 5 games in the 1931 finals. The Hawks would not bring back Dick Irvin as head coach though, as they rehired Bill Tobin, who coached the Hawks at the end of the 1929–30 season. Despite finishing with an under .500 record, as the Hawks would get 47 points in 48 games, the team finished in 2nd place in the American Division, and would qualify for the playoffs for the 3rd straight season.

The Black Hawks would be led offensively by Johnny Gottselig, who led the club with 13 goals and 28 points, while Tom Cook would finish just behind him with 12 goals and 25 points. Mush March would have a big season, scoring 12 goals and earning 22 points, while leading the club with 59 penalty minutes.

In goal, Chuck Gardiner would win the Vezina Trophy, as the Black Hawks would have the fewest goals against in the entire league. Gardiner would win 18 games, post a 1.85 GAA and have 4 shutouts.

One seemingly routine regular season game was recalled 30 years later in a February 1, 1962, episode of ABC television's The Untouchables, titled "Silent Partner" in which one of the characters, agent Lee Hobson, goes to the Black Hawks game vs. the New York Americans. The game was played on March 4, 1932, but narrator Walter Winchell's script put the date at March 5, possibly because researchers would have found stories about the night game in the next morning's newspapers. The show got the 6–1 Black Hawk victory correct, but it cannot be determined if Winchell's remark of attendance of 7,000 was also correct.

Chicago would face the Toronto Maple Leafs in the opening round of the playoffs for the 2nd straight year, however, unlike the previous season, the Black Hawks could not defeat Toronto in the 2 game total goal series, as the Leafs would eliminate the Hawks by a 6–2 score.

== Season standings ==
American Division
	GP	W	L	T	GF	GA	PTS
**New York Rangers**	48	23	17	8	134	112	54
**Chicago Black Hawks**	48	18	19	11	86	101	47
**Detroit Falcons**	48	18	20	10	95	108	46
Boston Bruins	48	15	21	12	122	117	42

Note: GP = Games Played, W = Wins, L = Losses, T = Ties, Pts = Points, GF = Goals For, GA = Goals Against
Teams that qualified for the playoffs are highlighted in bold.

=== Record vs. opponents ===
==== Vs. American Division ====
1931–32 NHL records
Team	**BOS**	**CHI**	**DET**	**NYR**	**Total**
Boston	—	2–4–2	3–1–4	2–4–2	**7–9–8**
Chicago	4–2–2	—	3–4–1	1–5–2	**8–11–5**
Detroit	1–3–4	4–3–1	—	3–3–2	**8–9–7**
N.Y. Rangers	4–2–2	5–1–2	3–3–2	—	**12–6–6**

==== Vs. Canadian Division ====
1931–32 NHL records
Team	**MTL**	**MTM**	**NYA**	**TOR**	**Total**
Boston	3–2–1	1–4–1	2–3–1	2–3–1	**8–12–4**
Chicago	1–4–1	2–1–3	4–1–1	3–2–1	**10–8–6**
Detroit	2–3–1	3–3	2–2–2	3–3	**10–11–3**
N.Y. Rangers	2–3–1	3–2–1	4–2	2–4	**11–11–2**

== Schedule and results ==
=== Regular season ===
1931–32 regular season
November

Game	Date	Visitor	Score	Home	Record	Points
1	November 12	Chicago Black Hawks	2–1	Toronto Maple Leafs	1–0–0	2
2	November 15	New York Americans	1–1	Chicago Black Hawks	1–0–1	3
3	November 18	Toronto Maple Leafs	1–1	Chicago Black Hawks	1–0–2	4
4	November 22	Montreal Maroons	2–4	Chicago Black Hawks	2–0–2	6
5	November 24	Chicago Black Hawks	1–1	New York Rangers	2–0–3	7
6	November 26	Chicago Black Hawks	0–1	Boston Bruins	2–1–3	7
7	November 29	New York Rangers	5–0	Chicago Black Hawks	2–2–3	7

December

Game	Date	Visitor	Score	Home	Record	Points
8	December 2	Montreal Canadiens	1–2	Chicago Black Hawks	3–2–3	9
9	December 6	Chicago Black Hawks	0–2	New York Americans	3–3–3	9
10	December 8	Chicago Black Hawks	1–1	Montreal Canadiens	3–3–4	10
11	December 13	Boston Bruins	3–0	Chicago Black Hawks	3–4–4	10
12	December 16	Detroit Falcons	1–4	Chicago Black Hawks	4–4–4	12
13	December 17	Chicago Black Hawks	1–4	Detroit Falcons	4–5–4	12
14	December 20	Toronto Maple Leafs	0–1	Chicago Black Hawks	5–5–4	14
15	December 22	Chicago Black Hawks	1–1	Montreal Maroons	5–5–5	15
16	December 27	Chicago Black Hawks	1–3	New York Rangers	5–6–5	15
17	December 29	Chicago Black Hawks	3–3	Boston Bruins	5–6–6	16

January

Game	Date	Visitor	Score	Home	Record	Points
18	January 1	New York Americans	2–3	Chicago Black Hawks	6–6–6	18
19	January 3	New York Rangers	1–1	Chicago Black Hawks	6–6–7	19
20	January 6	Detroit Falcons	2–4	Chicago Black Hawks	7–6–7	21
21	January 10	Boston Bruins	1–1	Chicago Black Hawks	7–6–8	22
22	January 13	Montreal Canadiens	2–1	Chicago Black Hawks	7–7–8	22
23	January 14	Chicago Black Hawks	0–2	Detroit Falcons	7–8–8	22
24	January 17	Montreal Maroons	3–3	Chicago Black Hawks	7–8–9	23
25	January 19	Chicago Black Hawks	3–2	Boston Bruins	8–8–9	25
26	January 21	Chicago Black Hawks	1–0	New York Americans	9–8–9	27
27	January 23	Chicago Black Hawks	3–3	Montreal Maroons	9–8–10	28
28	January 27	Detroit Falcons	1–2	Chicago Black Hawks	10–8–10	30
29	January 28	Chicago Black Hawks	2–4	Detroit Falcons	10–9–10	30
30	January 31	New York Rangers	3–0	Chicago Black Hawks	10–10–10	30

February

Game	Date	Visitor	Score	Home	Record	Points
31	February 3	Toronto Maple Leafs	0–7	Chicago Black Hawks	11–10–10	32
32	February 7	Chicago Black Hawks	0–1	New York Rangers	11–11–10	32
33	February 9	Chicago Black Hawks	3–1	New York Americans	12–11–10	34
34	February 11	Chicago Black Hawks	1–4	Montreal Canadiens	12–12–10	34
35	February 14	Chicago Black Hawks	1–3	Detroit Falcons	12–13–10	34
36	February 17	Montreal Canadiens	3–1	Chicago Black Hawks	12–14–10	34
37	February 20	Boston Bruins	1–2	Chicago Black Hawks	13–14–10	36
38	February 24	Montreal Maroons	1–3	Chicago Black Hawks	14–14–10	38
39	February 27	Chicago Black Hawks	2–4	Toronto Maple Leafs	14–15–10	38

March

Game	Date	Visitor	Score	Home	Record	Points
40	March 1	Chicago Black Hawks	0–1	Montreal Maroons	14–16–10	38
41	March 4	New York Americans	1–6	Chicago Black Hawks	15–16–10	40
42	March 6	New York Rangers	3–4	Chicago Black Hawks	16–16–10	42
43	March 8	Chicago Black Hawks	1–6	New York Rangers	16–17–10	42
44	March 10	Chicago Black Hawks	3–2	Boston Bruins	17–17–10	44
45	March 12	Chicago Black Hawks	0–1	Montreal Canadiens	17–18–10	44
46	March 16	Detroit Falcons	1–1	Chicago Black Hawks	17–18–11	45
47	March 19	Chicago Black Hawks	3–11	Toronto Maple Leafs	17–19–11	45
48	March 20	Boston Bruins	0–1	Chicago Black Hawks	18–19–11	47

Legend: Win (2 points) Loss (0 points) Tie (1 point)

== Playoffs ==
=== Maple Leafs 6, Black Hawks 2 ===
==== NHL quarter-finals ====
===== (C2) Toronto Maple Leafs vs. (A2) Chicago Black Hawks =====
March 27	Toronto Maple Leafs	0 – 1	Chicago Black Hawks	Chicago Stadium	Recap
No scoring		First period	No scoring
No scoring		Second period	No scoring
No scoring		Third period	7:12 – Lowrey (1) – (Unassisted)
Chabot (0-1-0)		Goalie stats	Gardiner (1-0-0)

March 29	Chicago Black Hawks	1 – 6	Toronto Maple Leafs	Maple Leaf Gardens	Recap
No scoring		First period	8:32 – Day (1) – (Unassisted); 9:55 – Conacher (1) – (Primeau)
No scoring		Second period	6:07 – Gracie (1) – (Finnigan); 12:47 – Conacher (2) – (Primeau); 16:06 – Finnigan (1) – (Cotton)
Coulter (1) – (Boucher) – 9:50		Third period	19:35 – Cotton (1) – (Bailey, Darragh)
Gardiner (1-1-0)		Goalie stats	Chabot (1-1-0)

Toronto wins series 6 – 2

== Player statistics ==
=== Scoring leaders ===
Player	GP	G	A	Pts	PIM
Johnny Gottselig	44	13	15	28	28
Tom Cook	48	12	13	25	36
Mush March	48	12	10	22	59
Paul Thompson	48	8	14	22	34
Vic Ripley	46	12	6	18	47

=== Goaltending ===
Player	GP	TOI	W	L	T	GA	SO	GAA
Chuck Gardiner	48	2989	18	19	11	92	4	1.85
Wilf Cude	1	41	0	0	0	9	0	13.17

== Playoff stats ==
=== Scoring leaders ===
Player	GP	G	A	Pts	PIM
Gerry Lowrey	2	1	0	1	2
Arthur Coulter	2	1	0	1	0
Buck Boucher	2	0	1	1	0

=== Goaltending ===
Player	GP	TOI	W	L	T	GA	SO	GAA
Chuck Gardiner	2	120	1	1	0	6	1	3.00
