= Jack McVicar =

Canadian ice hockey player

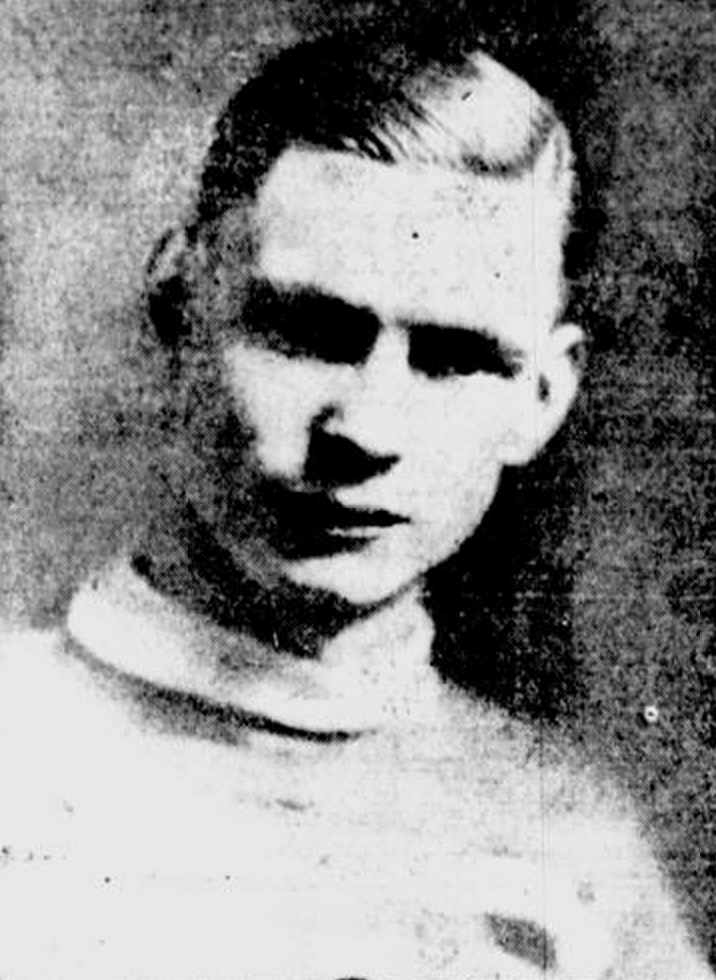
- Born: June 4, 1903; Renfrew, Ontario, Canada
- Died: February 20, 1952 (aged 48); Grimsby, Ontario, Canada
- Height: 6 ft 0 in (183 cm)
- Weight: 148 lb (67 kg; 10 st 8 lb)
- Position: Defence
- Shot: Right
- Played for: Montreal Maroons
- Playing career: 1923–1937

John Ritchie McVicar (June 4, 1903 — February 20, 1952) was a Canadian ice hockey player who played 88 games in the National Hockey League for the Montreal Maroons between 1930 and 1932. The rest of his career, which lasted from 1923 to 1937, was spent in various minor leagues.

== Personal life ==
He was born in Renfrew, Ontario. He died in 1952 in Grimsby, Ontario.

== Career statistics ==
=== Regular season and playoffs ===
			Regular season					Playoffs
Season	Team	League	GP	G	A	Pts	PIM	GP	G	A	Pts	PIM
1920–21	Iroquois Falls Papermakers	NOJHA	7	8	2	10	—	—	—	—	—	—
1921–22	Iroquois Falls Eskimos	NOJHA	—	—	—	—	—	—	—	—	—	—
1922–23	North Bay Trappers	NOHA	—	—	—	—	—	—	—	—	—	—
1923–24	Grimsby Peach Kings	OHA Sr	—	—	—	—	—	—	—	—	—	—
1924–25	Grimsby Peach Kings	OHA Sr	—	—	—	—	—	—	—	—	—	—
1925–26	Grimsby Peach Kings	OHA Sr	—	—	—	—	—	—	—	—	—	—
1926–27	Chicago Cardinals	AHA	6	0	0	0	2	—	—	—	—	—
1926–27	Quebec Castors	Can-Am	23	2	4	6	58	2	0	0	0	4
1927–28	Quebec Castors	Can-Am	39	5	4	9	42	6	1	1	2	8
1928–29	Newark Bulldogs	Can-Am	39	4	2	6	42	—	—	—	—	—
1929–30	Providence Reds	Can-Am	34	8	7	15	91	3	3	1	4	10
1930–31	Montreal Maroons	NHL	40	2	4	6	35	2	0	0	0	2
1931–32	Montreal Maroons	NHL	48	0	0	0	28	4	0	0	0	0
1932–33	Windsor Bulldogs	IHL	10	0	1	1	25	—	—	—	—	—
1932–33	Providence Reds	Can-Am	36	7	4	11	64	2	1	1	2	2
1933–34	Providence Reds	Can-Am	36	3	3	6	24	3	0	0	0	12
1936–37	Grimsby Peach Kings	NJCHL	13	0	2	2	14	2	0	0	0	0
Can-Am totals			207	29	24	53	321	16	5	3	8	36
NHL totals			88	2	4	6	63	6	0	0	0	2
