= Fred Robertson =

English ice hockey player

- Born: October 22, 1911 Carlisle, Cumbria, England, UK
- Died: September 16, 1997 (aged 85) Barrie, Ontario, Canada
- Height: 5 ft 10 in (178 cm)
- Weight: 198 lb (90 kg; 14 st 2 lb)
- Position: Defence
- Shot: Left
- Played for: Toronto Maple Leafs; Detroit Red Wings
- Playing career: 1929–1947

Frederick Alexander Robertson (October 22, 1911 – September 16, 1997) was a British-born Canadian professional ice hockey player who played 28 games in the National Hockey League with the Toronto Maple Leafs and Detroit Red Wings between 1932 and 1934. He won the Stanley Cup in 1932 with the Toronto Maple Leafs. The rest of his career, which lasted from 1929 to 1947, was mainly spent in the International American Hockey League/American Hockey League. He briefly served as head coach at John Carroll while playing for the Cleveland Barons. Robertson was born in the United Kingdom and moved to Canada at a young age, growing up in Toronto.

== Career statistics ==
=== Regular season and playoffs ===
			Regular season					Playoffs
Season	Team	League	GP	G	A	Pts	PIM	GP	G	A	Pts	PIM
1928–29	Toronto Canoe Club	OHA	9	3	2	5	—	3	3	1	4	—
1929–30	Toronto Canoe Club	OHA	4	2	0	2	20	—	—	—	—	—
1929–30	Sudbury K of C	NOJHA	5	3	0	3	0	—	—	—	—	—
1929–30	Toronto Eaton's	TMHL	15	7	4	11	28	2	0	1	1	8
1930–31	Toronto Marlboros	OHA	8	0	0	0	14	3	0	0	0	4
1930–31	Toronto Eaton's	TMHL	14	6	2	8	29	6	0	2	2	12
1931–32	Toronto Eaton's	TMHL	9	4	2	6	16	—	—	—	—	—
1931–32	Toronto Marlboros	OHA Sr	20	7	6	13	58	1	0	1	1	2
1931–32	Toronto Maple Leafs	NHL	8	0	0	0	23	7	0	0	0	0
1932–33	Syracuse Stars	IHL	42	3	4	7	109	5	1	1	2	6
1933–34	Detroit Red Wings	NHL	20	1	0	1	12	—	—	—	—	—
1933–34	Detroit Olympics	IHL	19	0	0	0	34	6	1	4	5	18
1934–35	Syracuse Stars	IHL	25	0	3	3	22	—	—	—	—	—
1934–35	Cleveland Falcons	IHL	20	3	1	4	20	2	0	0	0	2
1935–36	Cleveland Falcons	IHL	48	5	5	10	82	2	0	0	0	8
1936–37	Cleveland Barons	IAHL	32	0	7	7	28	—	—	—	—	—
1937–38	Cleveland Barons	IAHL	48	3	4	7	74	2	0	0	0	8
1938–39	Cleveland Barons	IAHL	51	0	1	1	45	9	0	2	2	8
1939–40	Cleveland Barons	IAHL	45	5	3	8	38	—	—	—	—	—
1940–41	Cleveland Barons	AHL	56	7	8	15	45	7	1	0	1	6
1941–42	Cleveland Barons	AHL	48	5	8	13	22	5	0	1	1	2
1942–43	Cleveland Barons	AHL	56	2	9	11	33	4	0	1	1	22
1943–44	Cleveland Barons	AHL	3	1	1	2	2	—	—	—	—	—
1943–44	Pittsburgh Hornets	AHL	33	3	5	8	12	—	—	—	—	—
1944–45	Pittsburgh Hornets	AHL	35	1	17	18	22	—	—	—	—	—
1944–45	Hershey Bears	AHL	15	2	3	5	4	11	0	3	3	4
1945–46	Hershey Bears	AHL	24	2	3	5	4	—	—	—	—	—
1945–46	St. Louis Flyers	AHL	16	0	4	4	6	—	—	—	—	—
1946–47	Toronto Stoneys	TIHL	20	1	2	3	9	6	0	1	1	2
IAHL/AHL totals			462	31	73	104	335	38	1	7	8	50
NHL totals			28	1	0	1	35	7	0	0	0	0

== See also ==
- List of National Hockey League players from the United Kingdom
