= 1931–32 New York Rangers season =

NHL hockey team season

1931–32 New York Rangers
- American Division champions
- Division: 1st American
- 1931–32 record: 23–17–8
- Home record: 13–7–4
- Road record: 10–10–4
- Goals for: 134
- Goals against: 112

Team information
- General manager: Lester Patrick
- Coach: Lester Patrick
- Captain: Bill Cook
- Arena: Madison Square Garden

Team leaders
- Goals: Bill Cook (34)
- Assists: Frank Boucher (23)
- Points: Bill Cook (48)
- Penalty minutes: Ching Johnson (106)
- Wins: John Ross Roach (23)
- Goals against average: John Ross Roach (2.23)

The 1931–32 New York Rangers season was the franchise's sixth season. In the regular season, the Rangers won the American Division with a 23–17–8 record. New York qualified for the Stanley Cup playoffs, where the Rangers defeated the Montreal Canadiens 3–1 to reach the Stanley Cup Finals for the third time in franchise history. In the Cup Finals, New York lost to the Toronto Maple Leafs, three games to none.

== Regular season ==
=== Final standings ===
American Division
	GP	W	L	T	GF	GA	PTS
**New York Rangers**	48	23	17	8	134	112	54
**Chicago Black Hawks**	48	18	19	11	86	101	47
**Detroit Falcons**	48	18	20	10	95	108	46
Boston Bruins	48	15	21	12	122	117	42

Note: GP = Games Played, W = Wins, L = Losses, T = Ties, Pts = Points, GF = Goals For, GA = Goals Against
Teams that qualified for the playoffs are highlighted in bold.

=== Record vs. opponents ===
==== Vs. American Division ====
1931–32 NHL records
Team	**BOS**	**CHI**	**DET**	**NYR**	**Total**
Boston	—	2–4–2	3–1–4	2–4–2	**7–9–8**
Chicago	4–2–2	—	3–4–1	1–5–2	**8–11–5**
Detroit	1–3–4	4–3–1	—	3–3–2	**8–9–7**
N.Y. Rangers	4–2–2	5–1–2	3–3–2	—	**12–6–6**

==== Vs. Canadian Division ====
1931–32 NHL records
Team	**MTL**	**MTM**	**NYA**	**TOR**	**Total**
Boston	3–2–1	1–4–1	2–3–1	2–3–1	**8–12–4**
Chicago	1–4–1	2–1–3	4–1–1	3–2–1	**10–8–6**
Detroit	2–3–1	3–3	2–2–2	3–3	**10–11–3**
N.Y. Rangers	2–3–1	3–2–1	4–2	2–4	**11–11–2**

== Schedule and results ==
1931–32 regular season
November: 5–1–2 (home: 2–1–1; road: 3–0–1)

Game	November	Opponent	Score	Record
1	12	@ Montreal Canadiens	4–1	1–0–0
2	15	Detroit Falcons	2–1	1–1–0
3	17	New York Americans	3–0	2–1–0
4	19	Boston Bruins	2–1	3–1–0
5	21	@ Toronto Maple Leafs	5–3	4–1–0
6	24	Chicago Black Hawks	1 – 1 OT	4–1–1
7	29	@ Chicago Black Hawks	5–0	5–1–1

December: 6–1–3 (home: 4–1–0; road: 2–0–3)

Game	December	Opponent	Score	Record
8	3	@ Detroit Falcons	1 – 1 OT	5–1–2
9	8	Toronto Maple Leafs	4–2	5–2–2
10	10	@ Montreal Maroons	3–2	6–2–2
11	13	@ New York Americans	2–1	7–2–2
12	15	@ Boston Bruins	2 – 2 OT	7–2–3
13	17	Montreal Maroons	5 – 4 OT	8–2–3
14	19	@ Montreal Canadiens	2 – 2 OT	8–2–4
15	22	Montreal Canadiens	6–2	9–2–4
16	25	New York Americans	6–0	10–2–4
17	27	Chicago Black Hawks	3–1	11–2–4

January: 7–5–1 (home: 5–2–0; road: 2–3–1)

Game	January	Opponent	Score	Record
18	1	Detroit Falcons	3–0	12–2–4
19	3	@ Chicago Black Hawks	1 – 1 OT	12–2–5
20	5	Montreal Maroons	2–0	13–2–5
21	7	@ Montreal Maroons	4–3	13–3–5
22	10	Toronto Maple Leafs	2–0	14–3–5
23	12	@ Boston Bruins	5 – 3 OT	15–3–5
24	14	Boston Bruins	3–1	16–3–5
25	17	@ Detroit Falcons	4–2	16–4–5
26	19	Montreal Canadiens	5–3	16–5–5
27	24	Detroit Falcons	4 – 3 OT	17–5–5
28	28	Boston Bruins	4–1	17–6–5
29	30	@ Toronto Maple Leafs	6 – 3 OT	17–7–5
30	31	@ Chicago Black Hawks	3–0	18–7–5

February: 2–5–2 (home: 1–2–2; road: 1–3–0)

Game	February	Opponent	Score	Record
31	2	Montreal Canadiens	4–1	18–8–5
32	7	Chicago Black Hawks	1–0	19–8–5
33	9	@ Boston Bruins	2–1	19–9–5
34	13	@ Montreal Canadiens	3–1	19–10–5
35	16	Detroit Falcons	2 – 2 OT	19–10–6
36	18	@ Toronto Maple Leafs	5–3	19–11–6
37	21	New York Americans	3–2	19–12–6
38	23	@ Boston Bruins	2 – 0 OT	20–12–6
39	25	Boston Bruins	3 – 3 OT	20–12–7

March: 3–5–1 (home: 1–1–1; road: 2–4–0)

Game	March	Opponent	Score	Record
40	3	@ Detroit Falcons	2–1	21–12–7
41	6	@ Chicago Black Hawks	4 – 3 OT	21–13–7
42	8	Chicago Black Hawks	6–1	22–13–7
43	10	@ New York Americans	5–1	22–14–7
44	13	Montreal Maroons	4 – 4 OT	22–14–8
45	15	@ Montreal Maroons	4–3	22–15–8
46	18	Toronto Maple Leafs	6–3	22–16–8
47	20	@ New York Americans	4–2	23–16–8
48	22	@ Detroit Falcons	5–4	23–17–8

Legend: Win (2 points) Loss (0 points) Tie (1 point)

== Playoffs ==
=== Finals ===
The Toronto Maple Leafs swept the best-of-five series against the New York Rangers three games to none. The first two games were to be played in New York City but because the circus was in town, the second game was played in Boston. The third and final game was played in Toronto. It was called the "Tennis Series", because the Leafs scored 6 goals in each game. The Rangers scored 4 times in their own building, twice at Boston Garden, and four more in Toronto.

Key: Win Loss

1932 Stanley Cup playoffs
Semifinals vs. (C1) Montreal Canadiens – Rangers win 3–1

Game	Date	Visitor	Score	Home	OT	Series
1	March 24	New York Rangers	3–4	Montreal Canadiens		Montreal leads series 1–0
2	March 26	New York Rangers	4–3	Montreal Canadiens	OT	Series tied 1–1
3	March 27	Montreal Canadiens	0–1	New York Rangers		New York Rangers lead series 2–1
4	March 30	Montreal Canadiens	2–5	New York Rangers		New York Rangers win series 3–1

Stanley Cup Finals vs. (C2) Toronto Maple Leafs – Maple Leafs win 3–0

Game	Date	Visitor	Score	Home	OT	Series
1	April 5	Toronto Maple Leafs	6–4	New York Rangers		Toronto leads series 1–0
2	April 7 (in Boston, Massachusetts)	Toronto Maple Leafs	6–2	New York Rangers		Toronto leads series 2–0
3	April 9	New York Rangers	4–6	Toronto Maple Leafs		Toronto wins series 3–0

Legend: Win Loss

== Player statistics ==
Skaters

Regular season
Player	GP	G	A	Pts	PIM
Bill Cook	48	33	14	47	33
Cecil Dillon	48	23	15	38	22
Frank Boucher	48	12	23	35	18
Frederick Cook	45	14	20	34	43
Art Somers	48	11	15	26	45
Murray Murdoch	48	5	16	21	32
Melville Keeling	48	17	3	20	38
Ivan Johnson	47	3	10	13	106
Norman Gainor	46	3	9	12	9
Earl Seibert	44	4	6	10	88
Doug Brennan	38	4	3	7	40
Victor Desjardins	48	3	3	6	16
Ehrhardt Heller	21	2	2	4	9
Hib Milks	45	0	4	4	12

Playoffs
Player	GP	G	A	Pts	PIM
Frank Boucher	7	3	6	9	0
Frederick Cook	7	6	2	8	12
Bill Cook	7	3	3	6	2
Ehrhardt Heller	7	3	1	4	8
Earl Seibert	7	1	2	3	14
Melville Keeling	7	2	1	3	12
Cecil Dillon	7	2	1	3	4
Ivan Johnson	7	2	0	2	24
Murray Murdoch	7	0	2	2	2
Doug Brennan	7	1	0	1	10
Art Somers	7	0	1	1	8
Hib Milks	7	0	0	0	0
Victor Desjardins	7	0	0	0	0
Norman Gainor	7	0	0	0	2

Goaltenders

Regular season
Player	GP	TOI	W	L	T	GA	GAA	SO
John Ross Roach	48	3020	23	17	8	112	2.23	9

Playoffs
Player	GP	TOI	W	L	T	GA	GAA	SO
John Ross Roach	7	480	3	4	0	27	3.38	1

^{†}Denotes player spent time with another team before joining Rangers. Stats reflect time with Rangers only.
^{‡}Traded mid-season. Stats reflect time with Rangers only.

Note:

Pos = Position;GP = Games played; G = Goals; A = Assists; Pts = Points; PIM = Penalty minutes; +/- = Plus/minus; PPG = Power-play goals; SHG = Short-handed goals; GWG = Game-winning goals
Pos = Position;GP = Games played; Min, TOI = Minutes played; W = Wins; L = Losses; T,T/OT = Ties; OTL = Overtime losses; GA = Goals-against; GAA = Goals-against average; SO = Shutouts; SA = Shots against; SV = Shots saved;SV% = Save percentage;

== See also ==
- 1931–32 NHL season
