= Alex Levinsky =

American-born Canadian ice hockey player

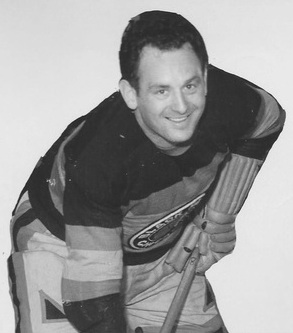
- Levinsky, circa 1934–39
- Born: February 2, 1910 Syracuse, New York, U.S.
- Died: September 1, 1990 (aged 80) Toronto, Ontario, Canada
- Height: 5 ft 10 in (178 cm)
- Weight: 184 lb (83 kg; 13 st 2 lb)
- Position: Defence
- Shot: Right
- Played for: Toronto Maple Leafs; New York Rangers; Chicago Black Hawks
- Playing career: 1930–1939

Alexander Levinsky (February 2, 1910 – September 1, 1990) was an American-born Canadian professional ice hockey defenceman who played nine seasons in the National Hockey League (NHL) for the Toronto Maple Leafs, Chicago Black Hawks and New York Rangers. He was given the nickname "Mine Boy", because it was noted that his father, who would attend his son's games, would shout: "That's mine boy."

== Biography ==
Levinsky was born in Syracuse, New York, grew up in Toronto, Ontario, and was Jewish. In his youth, he played for Canadian Sports Hall of Fame coach Bob Abate, and starred with Abate's Elizabeth Playground champion teams in baseball, basketball, hockey, and football before he concentrated on hockey. Before playing hockey professionally, he played baseball with St. George's; he later played hockey with the Toronto Marlboros.

He played 367 NHL games, in which he scored 19 goals and had 49 assists for 68 career points. He had 2 goals and 1 assist in 37 playoff games.

Levinsky graduated from the University of Toronto Faculty of Law (and played for the Varsity Blues 1929-1930) and later became a lawyer, car dealership owner and bowling alley owner.

== Career statistics ==
=== Regular season and playoffs ===
			Regular season					Playoffs
Season	Team	League	GP	G	A	Pts	PIM	GP	G	A	Pts	PIM
1928–29	Toronto Marlboros	OHA	8	4	1	5	—	3	0	4	4	—
1928–29	Toronto Marlboros	M-Cup	—	—	—	—	—	12	2	5	7	20
1929–30	University of Toronto	CIAUC	9	4	1	5	20	3	1	1	2	8
1930–31	Toronto Marlboros	OHA	10	3	0	3	16	3	0	0	0	8
1930–31	Toronto Maple Leafs	NHL	8	0	1	1	2	—	—	—	—	—
1931–32	Toronto Maple Leafs	NHL	47	5	5	10	29	—	—	—	—	—
1932–33	Toronto Maple Leafs	NHL	48	1	4	5	61	9	1	0	1	14
1933–34	Toronto Maple Leafs	NHL	47	5	11	16	38	5	0	0	0	6
1934–35	New York Rangers	NHL	21	0	4	4	6	—	—	—	—	—
1934–35	Chicago Black Hawks	NHL	23	3	4	7	16	2	0	0	0	0
1935–36	Chicago Black Hawks	NHL	48	1	7	8	69	2	0	1	1	0
1936–37	Chicago Black Hawks	NHL	48	0	8	8	32	—	—	—	—	—
1937–38	Chicago Black Hawks	NHL	48	3	2	5	18	7	1	0	1	0
1938–39	Philadelphia Ramblers	IAHL	17	4	5	9	2	—	—	—	—	—
1938–39	Chicago Black Hawks	NHL	30	1	3	4	36	—	—	—	—	—
1939–40	Philadelphia Ramblers	IAHL	53	3	13	16	22	—	—	—	—	—
NHL totals			368	19	49	68	307	25	2	1	3	20

== Awards and achievements ==
- 1932 Stanley Cup Championship (Toronto Maple Leafs)
- 1938 Stanley Cup Championship (Chicago Black Hawks)

== See also ==
- List of select Jewish ice hockey players
