= Art Alexandre =

Canadian ice hockey player

- Born: March 4, 1907; Saint-Jean-sur-Richelieu, Quebec, Canada
- Died: April 11, 1976 (aged 69)
- Height: 5 ft 5 in (165 cm)
- Weight: 150 lb (68 kg; 10 st 10 lb)
- Position: Left wing
- Shot: Left
- Played for: Montreal Canadiens
- Playing career: 1930–1938

Joseph Arthur Edgar Alexandre (March 4, 1907 – April 11, 1976) was a Canadian professional ice hockey player who played 11 games in the National Hockey League with the Montreal Canadiens during the 1931–32 and 1932–33 seasons. The rest of his career, which lasted from 1930 to 1938, was mainly spent in the Canadian–American Hockey League. He played left wing.

== Playing career ==
Alexandre was born in Saint-Jean-sur-Richelieu, Quebec, and played most of his career in minor hockey, mainly in Montreal based teams. He managed to play 11 games for the Canadiens, scoring no goals and 2 assists. He played most of his games in the Canadian–American Hockey League with the Providence Reds, Quebec Castors and the Springfield Indians.

== Career statistics ==
=== Regular season and playoffs ===
			Regular season					Playoffs
Season	Team	League	GP	G	A	Pts	PIM	GP	G	A	Pts	PIM
1930–31	Montreal St. Francois	MCHL	—	—	—	—	—	—	—	—	—	—
1930–31	Montreal CNR	MCHL	—	—	—	—	—	—	—	—	—	—
1931–32	Montreal Canadiens	NHL	10	0	2	2	0	4	0	0	0	0
1931–32	Montreal Senior Canadiens	MCHL	11	6	2	8	2	2	0	1	1	0
1932–33	Montreal Canadiens	NHL	1	0	0	0	0	—	—	—	—	—
1932–33	Providence Reds	Can-Am	47	10	24	34	18	2	0	0	0	0
1933–34	Providence Reds	Can-Am	37	2	3	5	19	2	0	0	0	2
1934–35	Providence Reds	Can-Am	10	1	0	1	4	—	—	—	—	—
1934–35	Quebec Castors	Can-Am	32	5	8	13	15	3	0	0	0	8
1935–36	Springfield Indians	Can-Am	47	13	16	29	32	3	0	1	1	2
1936–37	Kansas City Greyhounds	AHA	1	0	0	0	0	—	—	—	—	—
1937–38	Montreal Concordia Civics	QSHL	22	9	6	15	23	1	0	1	1	0
Can-Am totals			173	31	51	82	88	10	0	1	1	12
NHL totals			11	0	2	2	0	4	0	0	0	0
