= Ace Bailey =

Canadian ice hockey player (1903–1992)

- Hockey Hall of Fame, 1975
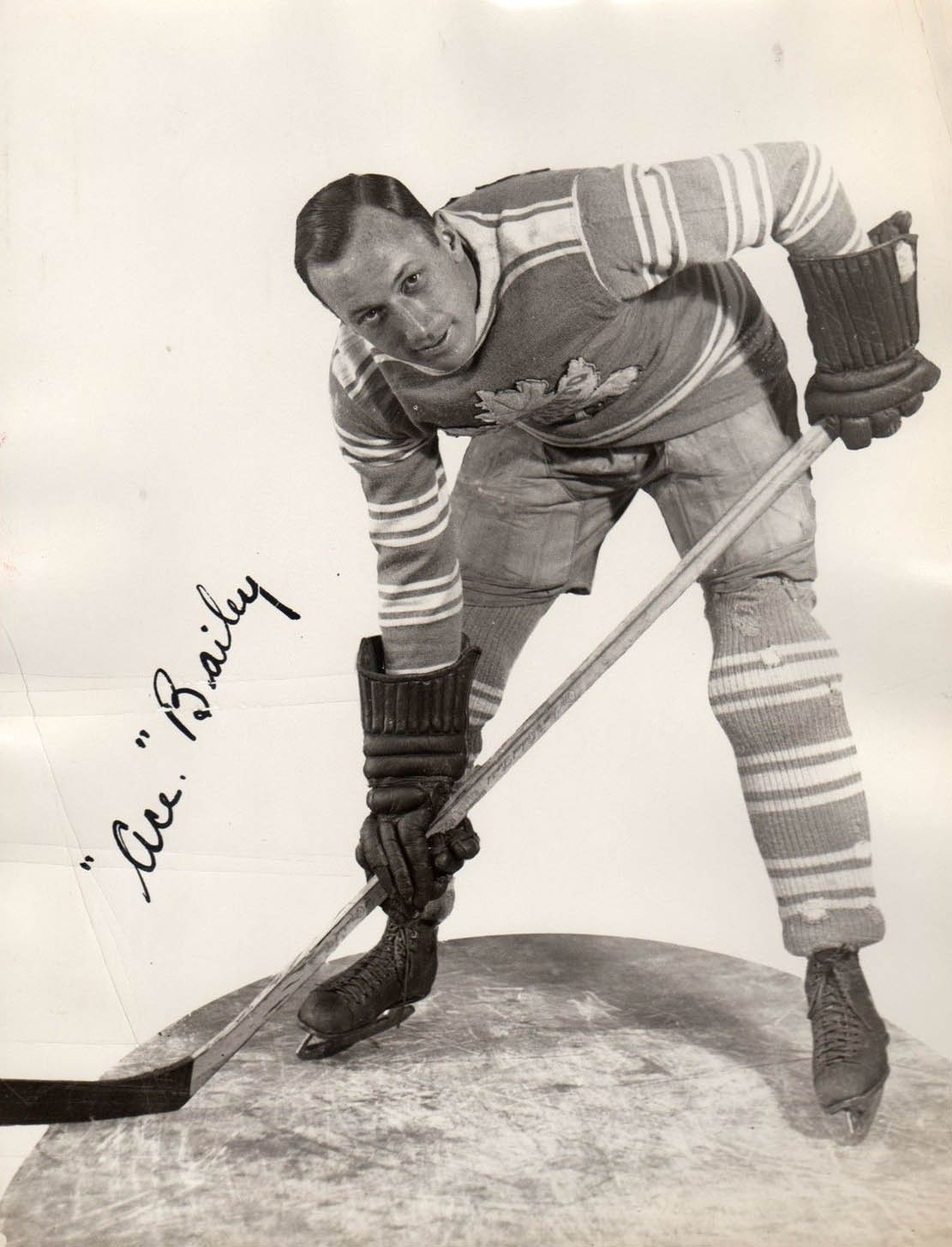
- Bailey in 1934
- Born: July 3, 1903 Bracebridge, Ontario, Canada
- Died: April 7, 1992 (aged 88) Toronto, Ontario, Canada
- Height: 5 ft 10 in (178 cm)
- Weight: 160 lb (73 kg; 11 st 6 lb)
- Position: Winger
- Shot: Right
- Played for: Toronto Maple Leafs
- Playing career: 1926–1933

Irvine Wallace "Ace" Bailey (July 3, 1903 – April 7, 1992) was a Canadian professional ice hockey player. He played for the Toronto Maple Leafs for eight seasons, from 1926 to 1933. His playing career ended with a hit from Eddie Shore in a game against the Boston Bruins; he was severely injured with a fractured skull when Shore hit Bailey from behind in retaliation for a check by teammate King Clancy. Bailey fell, fracturing his skull upon hitting the ice, and was knocked unconscious. Bailey is the first professional sports player to have a jersey number retired in his honour. Bailey led the NHL in scoring in 1929, and was inducted into the Hockey Hall of Fame in 1975.

== Playing career ==
Born in Bracebridge, Ontario, Bailey grew up in Toronto and attended the University of Toronto. After two years in university he joined the junior Toronto St. Mary's in the Ontario Hockey Association. He played senior hockey in Peterborough for two seasons (1924–1926) and in November 1926 was signed by the Toronto St. Patricks of the National Hockey League, renamed the Toronto Maple Leafs in his first season with the team. He was the leading scorer and goal scorer in the NHL in the 1928–29 season, with 22 goals and 32 points in 44 games. He was again the Leafs' leading scorer in 1929–30 and one point short of repeating in 1930–31. After three consecutive 20-goal seasons, his offensive production declined in the 1931–32 season. Bailey still helped Toronto win the Stanley Cup in 1932, scoring the Cup-winning goal in game 3 of the finals.

Bailey's career came to an abrupt end on December 12, 1933, when he was hit from behind by Eddie Shore of the Boston Bruins, and hit his head on the ice, fracturing his skull; he convulsed on the ice of the Boston Garden. This occurred after Maple Leafs teammate King Clancy upended Shore with a hard check as the latter player rushed up the ice. Angry, dazed, and thinking he was going after Clancy, Shore rushed at Bailey intent on revenge. Another teammate, Red Horner knocked Shore out cold with one punch after the incident. It was feared that Bailey would not survive after severely injuring his head. He came out of a coma for the second time 10 days later, making a full recovery, but did not play professionally again. When he was assured that Bailey would survive, league president Frank Calder suspended Shore for 16 games. An all-star benefit game was held at Maple Leaf Gardens on February 14, 1934, which raised $20,909 for Bailey and his family. Bailey and Shore shook hands and embraced at centre ice before the game began. Thirteen years later, the NHL introduced an annual all-star game.

Bailey's #6 sweater was the first ever to be retired by an NHL team, and is one of the 13 numbers (19 players) to have been permanently retired by the Maple Leafs. In 1968, Bailey asked it be unretired so Ron Ellis could wear it. Over his career, Bailey totaled 111 goals and 82 assists in 313 games.

== Post-playing career and death ==
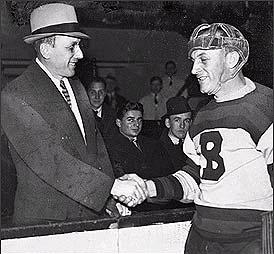
Bailey (left) shakes the hand of Eddie Shore at the benefit All-Star Game held in honour of Bailey.

Following his career-ending injury, Bailey asked the NHL if he could work as a linesman, but he was turned down. He coached the University of Toronto Varsity Blues men's ice hockey team from 1935 to 1940 and again after World War II from 1945 to 1949, winning three Canadian Interuniversity Athletics Union championships. He also worked as a timekeeper at Maple Leaf Gardens from 1938 until his retirement in 1984. On April 1, 1992, Bailey's number was again retired by the Maple Leafs; that same day Bailey had a stroke, and he died on April 7, 1992, of lung failure at the age of 88.

== Legacy ==
Bailey was inducted into the Hockey Hall of Fame in 1975. Named in his honour, the Ace Bailey Memorial ice hockey tournament for youth players is held annually in Stoney Creek, Ontario.

Bailey's jersey number was the first to ever be retired in professional sports; it was retired by the Maple Leafs' then-owner Conn Smythe at the game organized for his benefit.

== Transactions ==
- November 3, 1926 – Signed as a free agent by the Toronto Maple Leafs

== Awards and achievements ==
- 1928–29 – NHL scoring leader
- 1932 – Stanley Cup champion
- February 14, 1934 – #6 jersey retired by the Toronto Maple Leafs; first ever number retirement in professional sports
- 1975 – Hockey Hall of Fame, honoured member

== Career statistics ==
Career statistics for Ace Bailey
			Regular season					Playoffs
Season	Team	League	GP	G	A	Pts	PIM	GP	G	A	Pts	PIM
1921–22	Bracebridge Bird Mill	OHA	—	—	—	—	—	—	—	—	—	—
1922–23	Toronto St. Mary's	OHA	4	2	1	3	—	4	2	1	3	—
1922–23	Toronto St. Mary's	M-Cup	—	—	—	—	—	4	2	1	3	—
1923–24	Toronto St. Mary's	OHA	8	10	0	10	—	—	—	—	—	—
1924–25	Peterborough Seniors	OHA Sr	8	5	0	5	—	2	3	0	3	2
1924–25	Peterborough Seniors	Al-Cup	—	—	—	—	—	2	0	0	0	6
1925–26	Peterborough Seniors	OHA Sr	9	9	2	11	2	2	2	1	3	—
1925–26	Peterborough Seniors	Al-Cup	—	—	—	—	—	6	2	2	4	—
1926–27	Toronto Maple Leafs	NHL	42	15	13	28	82	—	—	—	—	—
1927–28	Toronto Maple Leafs	NHL	43	9	3	12	72	—	—	—	—	—
1928–29	Toronto Maple Leafs	NHL	44	22	10	32	78	4	1	2	3	4
1929–30	Toronto Maple Leafs	NHL	43	22	21	43	69	—	—	—	—	—
1930–31	Toronto Maple Leafs	NHL	40	23	19	42	46	2	1	1	2	0
1931–32	Toronto Maple Leafs	NHL	41	8	5	13	62	7	1	0	1	4
1932–33	Toronto Maple Leafs	NHL	47	10	8	18	52	8	0	1	1	4
1933–34	Toronto Maple Leafs	NHL	13	2	3	5	11	—	—	—	—	—
NHL totals			313	111	82	193	472	21	3	4	7	12

== See also ==
- Ace Bailey Benefit Game
- List of past NHL scoring leaders

Preceded by Howie Morenz	NHL Scoring Champion; 1929	Succeeded by Cooney Weiland
