= Doug Brennan =

Canadian ice hockey player

- Born: January 10, 1903 Peterborough, Ontario, Canada
- Died: November 8, 1972 (aged 69) Campbellford, Ontario, Canada
- Height: 5 ft 11 in (180 cm)
- Weight: 180 lb (82 kg; 12 st 12 lb)
- Position: Defence
- Shot: Left
- Played for: New York Rangers
- Playing career: 1925–1936

Douglas Richard Brennan (January 10, 1903 – November 8, 1972) was a Canadian professional hockey defenceman for the New York Rangers of the National Hockey League between 1931 and 1934. The rest of his career, which lasted from 1925 to 1936, was spent in the minor leagues. He won the Stanley Cup with the Rangers in 1933. He was born in Peterborough, Ontario.

== Playing career ==
Before getting to the NHL Brennan played for including the Winnipeg Maroons of the AHA, the Kenora Thistles of the NOHA, and the Vancouver Lions of the PCHL. He was acquired by the New York Rangers when they bought his professional rights from Vancouver on October 30, 1931. He would play for the team until he was released following the 1934 season. He won the Stanley Cup with New York in 1933. Following his time in New York he played 2 seasons in the CAHL his first year was spent with the Philadelphia Arrows and in his second year he played for the Springfield Indians. He retired from hockey after his one season in Springfield in 1936.

He died at Campbellford Memorial Hospital in 1972.

== Career statistics ==
=== Regular season and playoffs ===
			Regular season					Playoffs
Season	Team	League	GP	G	A	Pts	PIM	GP	G	A	Pts	PIM
1925–26	Peterborough Seniors	OHA Sr	—	—	—	—	—	—	—	—	—	—
1926–27	Winnipeg Maroons	AHA	7	2	0	2	10	—	—	—	—	—
1927–28	Winnipeg Maroons	AHA	26	2	0	2	8	—	—	—	—	—
1928–29	Vancouver Lions	PCHL	35	8	4	12	61	3	1	0	1	6
1929–30	Vancouver Lions	PCHL	32	11	4	15	58	4	1	0	1	10
1930–31	Vancouver Lions	PCHL	29	8	1	9	93	—	—	—	—	—
1931–32	New York Rangers	NHL	38	4	3	7	38	7	1	0	1	10
1932–33	New York Rangers	NHL	48	5	4	9	91	8	0	0	0	11
1933–34	New York Rangers	NHL	37	0	0	0	18	1	0	0	0	0
1933–34	Windsor Bulldogs	IHL	7	1	0	1	0	—	—	—	—	—
1934–35	Philadelphia Arrows	Can-Am	22	3	3	6	14	—	—	—	—	—
1934–35	Vancouver Lions	NWHL	12	1	4	5	10	8	0	1	1	4
1935–36	Springfield Indians	Can-Am	42	2	3	5	8	3	0	1	1	8
NHL totals			123	9	7	16	147	16	1	0	1	21
