= Red Horner =

Canadian ice hockey player (1909–2005)

- Hockey Hall of Fame, 1965
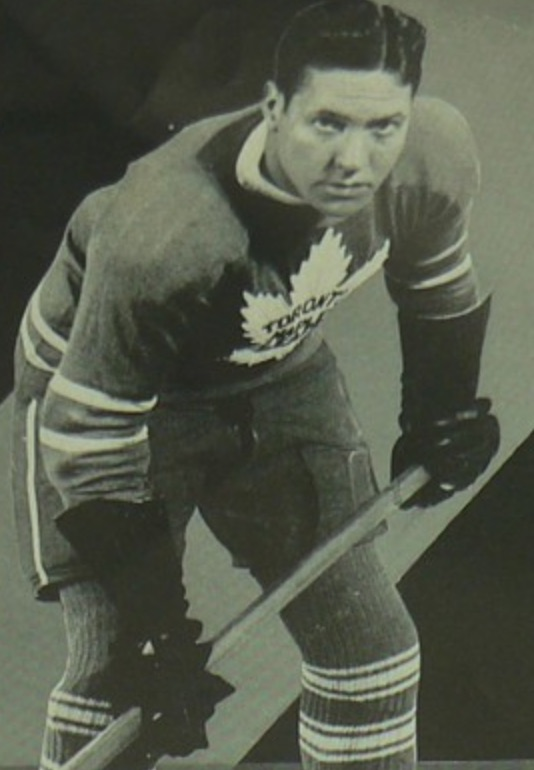
- Born: May 28, 1909 Lynden, Ontario, Canada
- Died: April 27, 2005 (aged 95) Toronto, Ontario, Canada
- Height: 6 ft 1 in (185 cm)
- Weight: 190 lb (86 kg; 13 st 8 lb)
- Position: Defence
- Shot: Right
- Played for: Toronto Maple Leafs
- Playing career: 1928–1940

George Reginald "Red" Horner (May 28, 1909 – April 27, 2005) was a Canadian ice hockey defenceman for the Toronto Maple Leafs of the National Hockey League from 1928 to 1940. He was the Leafs captain from 1938 until his retirement. He helped the Leafs win their third Stanley Cup in 1932. He was inducted into the Hockey Hall of Fame in 1965.

Born in Lynden, Ontario, Horner spent all of his time playing in Toronto, Ontario. As a junior player, he played for the Toronto Marlboros of the Ontario Hockey League. In his NHL career, he had the role of enforcer and retired with 42 goals, 110 assists and 1,264 penalty minutes in 490 regular season games. His election to the Hockey Hall of Fame has been considered rather controversial, as until his final two seasons was not considered the best defenseman on his team, let alone in the NHL. His contemporaries for most of his career were the Hall of Famers King Clancy and Hap Day, who were the best defensemen on his team. It seems to rest more on his unprecedented and unequaled seven seasons as the NHL penalty minute leader. He retired as the league's all-time penalty minute leader, a mark he held until Ted Lindsay broke it in the late Fifties.

After retiring from hockey in 1940, Horner lived in Florida, and Toronto, where he became involved in business ventures for several companies including the Elias Rogers Fuels Limited and the Canada Coal Company Limited, where he later became president before retiring.

On February 13, 1999, he was involved in the opening and closing ceremonies of the final game at Maple Leaf Gardens. He was also involved in the opening of the Air Canada Centre.

Horner was the last surviving member of Toronto's 1932 Stanley Cup team.

Horner was the oldest living NHL player at the time of his death in Toronto, Ontario, and was later interred in Mount Hope Catholic Cemetery in Toronto.

== Career statistics ==
Bold indicates led league

| | | | Regular season | | | | | Playoffs |
| Season | Team | League | GP | G | A | Pts | PIM | GP | G | A | Pts | PIM |
|---|---|---|---|---|---|---|---|---|---|---|---|---|
| 1926–27 | Toronto Marlboros | OHA-Jr. | 9 | 5 | 1 | 6 | — | 2 | 0 | 0 | 0 | — |
| 1927–28 | Toronto Marlboros | OHA-Jr. | 9 | 4 | 5 | 9 | 2 | 2 | 0 | 0 | 0 | 0 |
| 1927–28 | Toronto Marlboros | OHA-Sr. | 1 | 0 | 0 | 0 | 0 | — | — | — | — | — |
| 1927–28 | Toronto Marlboros | M-Cup | — | — | — | — | — | 11 | 7 | 5 | 12 | — |
| 1928–29 | Toronto Marlboros | OHA-Sr. | 2 | 0 | 0 | 0 | — | — | — | — | — | — |
| 1928–29 | Toronto Maple Leafs | NHL | 22 | 0 | 0 | 0 | 30 | 4 | 1 | 0 | 1 | 2 |
| 1929–30 | Toronto Maple Leafs | NHL | 33 | 2 | 7 | 9 | 96 | — | — | — | — | — |
| 1930–31 | Toronto Maple Leafs | NHL | 42 | 1 | 11 | 12 | 71 | 2 | 0 | 0 | 0 | 4 |
| 1931–32 | Toronto Maple Leafs | NHL | 42 | 7 | 9 | 16 | 97 | 7 | 2 | 2 | 4 | 20 |
| 1932–33 | Toronto Maple Leafs | NHL | 48 | 3 | 8 | 11 | **144** | 9 | 1 | 0 | 1 | 10 |
| 1933–34 | Toronto Maple Leafs | NHL | 40 | 11 | 10 | 21 | **146** | 5 | 1 | 0 | 1 | 6 |
| 1934–35 | Toronto Maple Leafs | NHL | 46 | 4 | 8 | 12 | **125** | 7 | 0 | 1 | 1 | 4 |
| 1935–36 | Toronto Maple Leafs | NHL | 43 | 2 | 9 | 11 | **167** | 9 | 1 | 2 | 3 | 22 |
| 1936–37 | Toronto Maple Leafs | NHL | 48 | 3 | 9 | 12 | **124** | 2 | 0 | 0 | 0 | 7 |
| 1937–38 | Toronto Maple Leafs | NHL | 47 | 4 | 20 | 24 | 82 | 7 | 0 | 1 | 1 | 14 |
| 1938–39 | Toronto Maple Leafs | NHL | 48 | 4 | 10 | 14 | **85** | 10 | 1 | 2 | 3 | 26 |
| 1939–40 | Toronto Maple Leafs | NHL | 31 | 1 | 9 | 10 | **87** | 9 | 0 | 2 | 2 | 55 |
| NHL totals | | | 490 | 42 | 110 | 152 | 1254 | 71 | 7 | 10 | 17 | 170 |

== See also ==
- List of NHL players who spent their entire career with one franchise

| Preceded by Charlie Conacher | Toronto Maple Leafs captain 1938–40 | Succeeded by Syl Apps |
