= Harold Cotton (ice hockey) =

Canadian professional ice hockey player

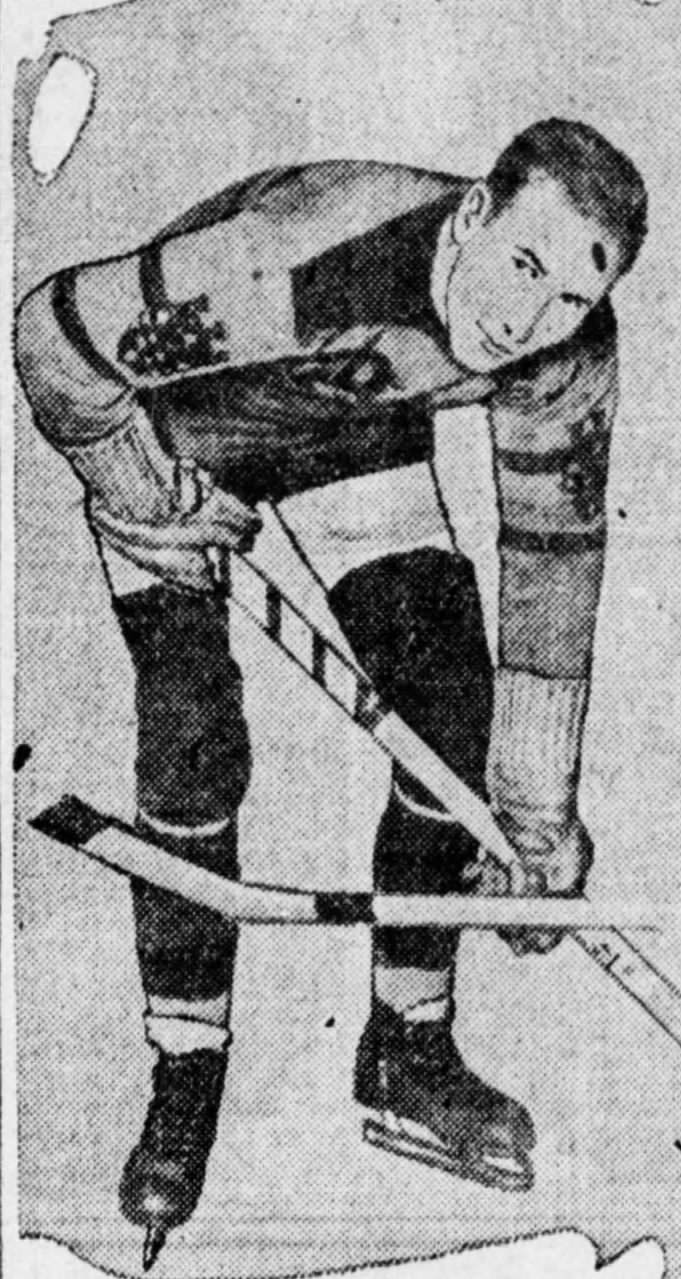
- Cotton in the 1928-29 season for the Pittsburgh Pirates
- Born: November 5, 1902 Nanticoke, Ontario, Canada
- Died: September 9, 1984 (aged 81)
- Height: 5 ft 10 in (178 cm)
- Weight: 155 lb (70 kg; 11 st 1 lb)
- Position: Left wing
- Shot: Left
- Played for: NHL; Pittsburgh Pirates; Toronto Maple Leafs; New York Americans; IAHL; New Haven Eagles; USAHA; Pittsburgh Yellow Jackets
- Playing career: 1923–1937

Harold William "Baldy" Cotton (November 5, 1902 – September 9, 1984) was a Canadian professional ice hockey player who played 12 seasons in the National Hockey League for the Pittsburgh Pirates, Toronto Maple Leafs and New York Americans.

== Playing career ==
Cotton's hockey career began in Pittsburgh after moving there to attend Duquesne University. In 1925, he began playing for the Pittsburgh Yellow Jackets of the United States Amateur Hockey Association while attending school. He would later sign with the NHL's Pittsburgh Pirates, playing with the club for parts of 4 seasons. He was traded to the Toronto Maple Leafs in the middle of the 1928–29 season and would record a career high 38 points the following year in his first full season with Toronto. Cotton won his only Stanley Cup playing for the Maple Leafs in 1931–32. In 1935, Cotton was sold to the New York Americans where he played for two more seasons until his retirement in 1937.

== Front office ==
After playing professional hockey, Cotton served as a scout for the Boston Bruins and Minnesota North Stars, retiring from hockey permanently in 1977.

== Awards and achievements ==
- 1931–32 - Stanley Cup Champion - Toronto Maple Leafs
- 1933–34 - Played in Ace Bailey Benefit Game

== Transactions ==
- Signed as a free agent by the Pittsburgh Pirates, September 26, 1925.
- Traded by the Pittsburgh Pirates to the Toronto Maple Leafs for Gerry Lowrey and $9,500, February 12, 1929.
- Sold by the Toronto Maple Leafs to the NY Americans for cash, October 9, 1935.

== Career statistics ==
=== Regular season and playoffs ===
| | | | Regular season | | | | | Playoffs |
| Season | Team | League | GP | G | A | Pts | PIM | GP | G | A | Pts | PIM |
|---|---|---|---|---|---|---|---|---|---|---|---|---|
| 1919–20 | Parkdale Canoe Club | OHA | 6 | 3 | 0 | 3 | 0 | — | — | — | — | — |
| 1920–21 | Toronto Maitlands | OHA | — | — | — | — | — | — | — | — | — | — |
| 1921–22 | Toronto Aura Lee | OHA | 6 | 8 | 1 | 9 | — | — | — | — | — | — |
| 1922–23 | Toronto Aura Lee | OHA | 11 | 5 | 3 | 8 | — | — | — | — | — | — |
| 1923–24 | Pittsburgh Yellow Jackets | USAHA | 20 | 7 | 0 | 7 | 0 | 13 | 2 | 3 | 5 | — |
| 1924–25 | Pittsburgh Yellow Jackets | USAHA | 40 | 7 | 0 | 7 | 0 | 8 | 2 | 0 | 2 | — |
| 1925–26 | Pittsburgh Pirates | NHL | 33 | 7 | 1 | 8 | 22 | — | — | — | — | — |
| 1926–27 | Pittsburgh Pirates | NHL | 35 | 5 | 0 | 5 | 17 | — | — | — | — | — |
| 1927–28 | Pittsburgh Pirates | NHL | 42 | 9 | 3 | 12 | 40 | 2 | 1 | 1 | 2 | 2 |
| 1928–29 | Pittsburgh Pirates | NHL | 32 | 3 | 2 | 5 | 38 | — | — | — | — | — |
| 1928–29 | Toronto Maple Leafs | NHL | 11 | 1 | 2 | 3 | 8 | — | — | — | — | — |
| 1929–30 | Toronto Maple Leafs | NHL | 41 | 21 | 17 | 38 | 47 | — | — | — | — | — |
| 1930–31 | Toronto Maple Leafs | NHL | 43 | 12 | 17 | 29 | 45 | 2 | 0 | 0 | 0 | 2 |
| 1931–32 | Toronto Maple Leafs | NHL | 47 | 5 | 13 | 18 | 41 | 7 | 2 | 2 | 4 | 8 |
| 1932–33 | Toronto Maple Leafs | NHL | 48 | 10 | 11 | 21 | 29 | 9 | 0 | 3 | 3 | 6 |
| 1933–34 | Toronto Maple Leafs | NHL | 47 | 8 | 14 | 22 | 46 | 5 | 0 | 2 | 2 | 0 |
| 1934–35 | Toronto Maple Leafs | NHL | 47 | 11 | 14 | 25 | 36 | 7 | 0 | 0 | 0 | 17 |
| 1935–36 | New York Americans | NHL | 45 | 7 | 9 | 16 | 27 | 5 | 0 | 1 | 1 | 9 |
| 1936–37 | New York Americans | NHL | 29 | 2 | 0 | 2 | 23 | — | — | — | — | — |
| 1936–37 | New Haven Eagles | IAHL | 18 | 4 | 8 | 12 | 48 | — | — | — | — | — |
| NHL totals | | | 500 | 101 | 103 | 204 | 419 | 37 | 3 | 9 | 12 | 44 |
