= American Division (NHL) =

Former NHL division

- League: National Hockey League
- Sport: Ice hockey
- Founded: 1926
- Folded: 1938
- Most titles: Boston Bruins (7)

The National Hockey League's American Division was formed after expansion in 1926. The division existed for 12 seasons until 1938. Its champion was awarded the Prince of Wales Trophy.

During its run as a separate division, the American Division was the slightly more successful of the league's two divisions. American Division teams won seven Stanley Cup championships compared with five won by the Canadian Division and contested three intra-divisional Finals under the cross-over playoff format then in use, compared to only one such Finals between two Canadian Division teams.

== Division lineups ==
=== 1926–1930 ===
1926–30 American Division Teams
- Boston Bruins
- Chicago Black Hawks
- Detroit Cougars
- New York Rangers
- Pittsburgh Pirates

==== Changes from the 1925–26 season ====
- The American Division is formed as the result of NHL realignment.
- The Boston Bruins and Pittsburgh Pirates join the American Division.
- The Chicago Black Hawks, Detroit Cougars and New York Rangers are admitted as expansion teams. (The Black Hawks and Cougars acquired the contracts of the Portland Rosebuds and Victoria Cougars, respectively, from the disbanding Western Hockey League however the league does not consider the Chicago and Detroit franchises to be continuations of the defunct WHL teams.)

=== 1930–1931 ===
1930–31 American Division Teams
- Boston Bruins
- Chicago Black Hawks
- Detroit Falcons
- New York Rangers
- Philadelphia Quakers

==== Changes from the 1929–30 season ====
- The Detroit Cougars change their name to the Detroit Falcons
- The Pittsburgh Pirates moved to Philadelphia, Pennsylvania to become the Philadelphia Quakers

=== 1931–1933 ===
1931–33 American Division Teams
- Boston Bruins
- Chicago Black Hawks
- Detroit Falcons
- New York Rangers

==== Changes from the 1930–31 season ====
- The Philadelphia Quakers folded due to financial problems

=== 1933–1938 ===
1933–38 American Division Teams
- Boston Bruins
- Chicago Black Hawks
- Detroit Red Wings
- New York Rangers

==== Changes from 1932–33 season ====
- The Detroit Falcons change their name to the Detroit Red Wings

=== After the 1937–38 season ===
The league collapsed into one single table, reverting to the format of the 1925–26 season, after the Montreal Maroons folded in 1938.

== Division champions ==
- 1927 – New York Rangers (25–13–6, 56 pts)
- 1928 – Boston Bruins (20–13–11, 51 pts)
- 1929 – Boston Bruins (26–13–5, 57 pts)
- 1930 – Boston Bruins (38–5–1, 77 pts)
- 1931 – Boston Bruins (28–10–6, 62 pts)
- 1932 – New York Rangers (23–17–8, 54 pts)
- 1933 – Boston Bruins (25–15–8, 58 pts)
- 1934 – Detroit Red Wings (24–14–10, 58 pts)
- 1935 – Boston Bruins (26–16–6, 58 pts)
- 1936 – Detroit Red Wings (24–16–8, 56 pts)
- 1937 – Detroit Red Wings (25–14–9, 59 pts)
- 1938 – Boston Bruins (30–11–7, 67 pts)

== Stanley Cup winners produced ==
- 1928 – New York Rangers
- 1929 – Boston Bruins
- 1933 – New York Rangers
- 1934 – Chicago Black Hawks
- 1936 – Detroit Red Wings
- 1937 – Detroit Red Wings
- 1938 – Chicago Black Hawks

== See also ==
- History of the National Hockey League
