= Canadian Division (NHL) =

Former NHL division

- League: National Hockey League
- Sport: Ice hockey
- Founded: 1926
- Folded: 1938
- Most titles: Montreal Canadiens (5)

The National Hockey League's Canadian Division was formed after expansion in 1926. The division existed for 12 seasons until 1938. Despite its name, the division contained at least one team based in the United States throughout its existence. Its champion was awarded the O'Brien Trophy.

During its run as a separate division, when considered as a whole the Canadian Division was the slightly less successful of the league's two divisions, winning five Stanley Cup championships compared with seven won by the American Division. Under the cross-over playoff format then in use, Canadian Division teams contested just one intra-divisional Finals, compared to three such series played by American Division teams. Notably however, Canadian teams won all twelve division titles and were the only teams from the division to reach the Finals during this time. Also, each of the four Canadian teams then in existence won the Cup at least once.

== Division lineups ==
=== 1926–1927 ===
1926–27 Canadian Division Teams
- Montreal Canadiens
- Montreal Maroons
- New York Americans
- Ottawa Senators
- Toronto St. Patricks

==== Changes from the 1925–26 season ====
- The Canadian Division is formed as the result of NHL realignment

=== 1927–1931 ===
1927–31 Canadian Division Teams
- Montreal Canadiens
- Montreal Maroons
- New York Americans
- Ottawa Senators
- Toronto Maple Leafs

==== Changes from the 1926–27 season ====
- Toronto changed their nickname from the St. Patricks to the Maple Leafs

=== 1931–1932 ===
1931–32 Canadian Division Teams
- Montreal Canadiens
- Montreal Maroons
- New York Americans
- Toronto Maple Leafs

==== Changes from the 1930–31 season ====
- The Ottawa Senators took a leave of absence from the league

=== 1932–1934 ===
1932–34 Canadian Division Teams
- Montreal Canadiens
- Montreal Maroons
- New York Americans
- Ottawa Senators
- Toronto Maple Leafs

==== Changes from the 1931–32 season ====
- The Ottawa Senators returned from their absence

=== 1934–1935 ===
1934–35 Canadian Division Teams
- Montreal Canadiens
- Montreal Maroons
- New York Americans
- St. Louis Eagles
- Toronto Maple Leafs

==== Changes from the 1933–34 season ====
- The Ottawa Senators moved to St. Louis, Missouri, to become the St. Louis Eagles

=== 1935–1938 ===
1935–38 Canadian Division Teams
- Montreal Canadiens
- Montreal Maroons
- New York Americans
- Toronto Maple Leafs

==== Changes from the 1934–35 season ====
- The St. Louis Eagles folded due to financial problems

=== After the 1937–38 season ===
The league collapsed into one single table, reverting to the format of the 1925–26 season, after the Montreal Maroons suspended operations in 1938.

== Division champions ==
- 1927 – Ottawa Senators (30–10–4, 64 pts)
- 1928 – Montreal Canadiens (26–11–7, 59 pts)
- 1929 – Montreal Canadiens (22–7–15, 59 pts)
- 1930 – Montreal Maroons (23–16–5, 51 pts)
- 1931 – Montreal Canadiens (26–10–8, 60 pts)
- 1932 – Montreal Canadiens (25–16–7, 57 pts)
- 1933 – Toronto Maple Leafs (24–18–6, 54 pts)
- 1934 – Toronto Maple Leafs (26–13–9, 61 pts)
- 1935 – Toronto Maple Leafs (30–14–4, 64 pts)
- 1936 – Montreal Maroons (22–16–10, 54 pts)
- 1937 – Montreal Canadiens (24–18–6, 54 pts)
- 1938 – Toronto Maple Leafs (24–15–9, 57 pts)

== Stanley Cup winners produced ==
- 1927 – Ottawa Senators
- 1930 – Montreal Canadiens
- 1931 – Montreal Canadiens
- 1932 – Toronto Maple Leafs
- 1935 – Montreal Maroons

== See also ==
- North Division
- History of the National Hockey League
