= 1932–33 NHL transactions =

The following is a list of all team-to-team transactions that have occurred in the National Hockey League (NHL) during the 1932–33 NHL season. It lists which team each player has been traded to and for which player(s) or other consideration(s), if applicable.

== Transactions ==
July 2, 1932	To New York Rangers Babe Siebert	To Montreal Maroons cash
July 25, 1932	To Boston Bruins Joe Lamb $7,000 cash	To Ottawa Senators Cooney Weiland
August 22, 1932	To Boston Bruins rights to Obs Heximer	To New York Rangers $10,000 cash
September 1, 1932	To Detroit Red Wings Melville Vail	To New York Rangers Frank Peters
October 17, 1932	To Boston Bruins Nels Stewart	To Montreal Maroons cash
October 17, 1932	To Boston Bruins Frank Ingram	To Chicago Black Hawks cash
October 19, 1932	To Ottawa Senators Bert McInenly	To New York Americans cash
October 25, 1932	To Detroit Red Wings rights to John Ross Roach	To New York Rangers $11,000 cash
November 3, 1932	To Toronto Maple Leafs Stew Adams	To Chicago Black Hawks cash
December 9, 1932	To Montreal Maroons Reg Noble	To Detroit Red Wings John Gallagher
December 11, 1932	To Detroit Red Wings rights to Carl Voss	To New York Rangers $5,500 cash
December 18, 1932	To Montreal Maroons Russ Blinco	To New York Rangers no return acquisition
December 22, 1932	To New York Americans Wilf Starr	To New York Rangers cash
December 23, 1932	To Ottawa Senators rights to Dutch Gainor	To New York Rangers cash
December 27, 1932	To New York Americans loan of Bill Regan for remainder of 1932-33 season	To New York Rangers cash
January 17, 1933	To Boston Bruins Vic Ripley	To Chicago Black Hawks Billy Burch
January 25, 1933	To Boston Bruins Alex Smith	To Ottawa Senators future considerations (Earl Roche)
February 2, 1933	To Ottawa Senators Harvey Rockburn	To Montreal Maroons cash
February 3, 1933	To Montreal Maroons Wally Kilrea	To Ottawa Senators Desse Roche
February 12, 1933	To Boston Bruins Tommy Filmore	To New York Americans Lloyd Klein
February 14, 1933	To Montreal Canadiens Leo Bourgeault; Harold Starr	To Ottawa Senators Marty Burke
March 23, 1933	To Montreal Canadiens Marty Burke	To Ottawa Senators Nick Wasnie
