= 1932–33 Ottawa Senators season =

National Hockey League team season

1932–33 Ottawa Senators
- Division: 5th Canadian
- 1932–33 record: 11–27–10
- Home record: 8–11–4
- Road record: 3–16–6
- Goals for: 88
- Goals against: 131

Team information
- General manager: Dave Gill
- Coach: Cy Denneny
- Captain: Frank Finnigan
- Arena: Ottawa Auditorium

Team leaders
- Goals: Cooney Weiland (16)
- Assists: Frank Finnigan (14)
- Points: Cooney Weiland (27)
- Penalty minutes: Allan Shields (119)
- Wins: Bill Beveridge (7)
- Goals against average: Alec Connell (2.56)

The 1932–33 Ottawa Senators season was the team's 15th season in the NHL and 47th season of play overall. After a one-year hiatus, as the Senators had suspended operations for the 1931–32 NHL season, the team rejoined the NHL, and announced former Senators star player Cy Denneny as head coach of the club.

== Regular season ==
Players on loan to other clubs were returned to the Senators, including Syd Howe and captain Frank Finnigan. Former Boston Bruins star player Cooney Weiland joined the team and led the Senators in goals (16) and points (27), while Howe would chip in with 12 goals and 24 points. Rookie right-wing Gus Forslund played the season for the Senators, becoming the first Swedish-born player in the NHL. The Senators blueline was led by Allan Shields, who led all defensemen with 11 points, while leading the team and being among the NHL leaders in penalty minutes at 119.

In goal, Alec Connell would start the season for the Senators, however, he would miss some games due to injury, and would eventually lose his starters job to Bill Beveridge, who emerged as the teams number 1 goaltender. Beveridge would lead the team with 7 victories, while Connell would post a team best 2.56 GAA.

The Senators would start off the season with a respectable 7–7–3 record through their first 17 games, however, they would slump to a 4–20–7 record the rest of the way, and owner Frank Ahearn had Denneny fine some players who displayed indifferent hockey. The Sens would finish in last place in the NHL for the second straight time.

=== Final standings ===
Canadian Division
	GP	W	L	T	GF	GA	PTS
**Toronto Maple Leafs**	48	24	18	6	119	111	54
**Montreal Maroons**	48	22	20	6	135	119	50
**Montreal Canadiens**	48	18	25	5	92	115	41
New York Americans	48	15	22	11	91	118	41
Ottawa Senators	48	11	27	10	88	131	32

Note: W = Wins, L = Losses, T = Ties, GF = Goals For, GA = Goals Against, Pts = Points
Teams that qualified for the playoffs are highlighted in bold.

=== Record vs. opponents ===
==== Vs. Canadian Division ====
1932–33 NHL records
Team	MTL	MTM	NYA	OTT	TOR	Total
M. Canadiens	—	2–3–1	2–3–1	4–2	3–3	**11–11–2**
M. Maroons	3–2–1	—	3–3	3–3	2–3–1	**11–11–2**
N.Y. Americans	3–2–1	3–3	—	2–3–1	3–2–1	**11–10–3**
Ottawa	2–4	3–3	3–2–1	—	0–6	**8–15–1**
Toronto	3–3	3–2–1	2–3–1	6–0	—	**14–8–2**

==== Vs. American Division ====
1932–33 NHL records
Team	BOS	CHI	DET	NYR	Total
M. Canadiens	1–4–1	3–3	2–3–1	1–4–1	**7–14–3**
M. Maroons	2–4	2–2–2	4–1–1	3–2–1	**11–9–4**
N.Y. Americans	2–2–2	2–2–2	0–3–3	2–3–1	**6–10–8**
Ottawa	1–3–2	1–2–3	1–4–1	0–3–3	**3–12–9**
Toronto	1–4–1	2–2–2	3–2–1	4–2	**10–10–4**

== Schedule and results ==
1932–33 regular season
November: 3–2–0 (home: 2–1–0; road: 1–1–0)

Game	Date	Visitor	Score	Home	OT	Decision	Attendance	Arena	Record	Pts
1	November 12	Maroons	2–1	Ottawa		Connell	N/A	Ottawa Auditorium	0–1–0	0
2	November 19	Detroit	0–2	Ottawa		Connell	N/A	Ottawa Auditorium	1–1–0	2
3	November 24	Ottawa	6–3	Maroons		Connell	N/A	Montreal Forum	2–1–0	4
4	November 26	Ottawa	4–6	Boston		Connell	N/A	Boston Garden	2–2–0	4
5	November 29	Chicago	1–3	Ottawa		Connell	N/A	Ottawa Auditorium	3–2–0	6

December: 4–6–3 (home: 3–0–2; road: 1–6–1)

Game	Date	Visitor	Score	Home	OT	Decision	Attendance	Arena	Record	Pts
6	December 1	Americans	3–4	Ottawa		Connell	N/A	Ottawa Auditorium	4–2–0	8
7	December 3	Ottawa	1–4	Toronto		Connell	N/A	Maple Leaf Gardens	4–3–0	8
8	December 4	Ottawa	0–2	Detroit		Connell	N/A	Detroit Olympia	4–4–0	8
9	December 6	Ottawa	1–1	Chicago	OT	Connell	N/A	Chicago Stadium	4–4–1	9
10	December 8	Canadiens	0–2	Ottawa		Beveridge	N/A	Ottawa Auditorium	5–4–1	11
11	December 10	Ottawa	2–3	Canadiens	OT	Beveridge	N/A	Montreal Forum	5–5–1	11
12	December 13	Ottawa	2–0	Americans		Beveridge	N/A	Madison Square Garden	6–5–1	13
13	December 15	Ottawa	1–4	Toronto		Connell	N/A	Maple Leaf Gardens	6–6–1	13
14	December 17	Rangers	2–2	Ottawa	OT	Beveridge	N/A	Ottawa Auditorium	6–6–2	14
15	December 20	Ottawa	1–2	Boston		Beveridge	N/A	Boston Garden	6–7–2	14
16	December 24	Boston	1–1	Ottawa	OT	Beveridge	N/A	Ottawa Auditorium	6–7–3	15
17	December 27	Maroons	0–3	Ottawa		Beveridge	N/A	Ottawa Auditorium	7–7–3	17
18	December 29	Ottawa	2–4	Rangers		Beveridge	N/A	Madison Square Garden	7–8–3	17

January: 1–10–2 (home: 1–5–0; road: 0–5–2)

Game	Date	Visitor	Score	Home	OT	Decision	Attendance	Arena	Record	Pts
19	January 3	Detroit	1–0	Ottawa		Beveridge	N/A	Ottawa Auditorium	7–9–3	17
20	January 5	Ottawa	1–1	Americans	OT	Beveridge	N/A	Madison Square Garden	7–9–4	18
21	January 7	Ottawa	0–1	Canadiens		Beveridge	N/A	Montreal Forum	7–10–4	18
22	January 10	Ottawa	2–3	Boston	OT	Beveridge	N/A	Boston Garden	7–11–4	18
23	January 12	Americans	5–2	Ottawa		Beveridge	N/A	Ottawa Auditorium	7–12–4	18
24	January 14	Toronto	5–3	Ottawa	OT	Beveridge	N/A	Maple Leaf Gardens	7–13–4	18
25	January 17	Canadiens	2–3	Ottawa		Beveridge	N/A	Ottawa Auditorium	8–13–4	20
26	January 19	Ottawa	3–7	Maroons		Beveridge	N/A	Montreal Forum	8–14–4	20
27	January 22	Ottawa	1–2	Chicago		Connell	N/A	Chicago Stadium	8–15–4	20
28	January 24	Toronto	4–2	Ottawa		Connell	N/A	Ottawa Auditorium	8–16–4	20
29	January 26	Ottawa	1–1	Detroit	OT	Connell	N/A	Detroit Olympia	8–16–5	21
30	January 28	Rangers	9–2	Ottawa		Beveridge	N/A	Ottawa Auditorium	8–17–5	21
31	January 31	Ottawa	1–3	Montreal	OT	Connell	N/A	Montreal Forum	8–18–5	21

February: 1–4–3 (home: 1–3–1; road: 0–1–2)

Game	Date	Visitor	Score	Home	OT	Decision	Attendance	Arena	Record	Pts
32	February 2	Chicago	1–1	Ottawa	OT	Connell	N/A	Ottawa Auditorium	8–18–6	22
33	February 4	Boston	2–3	Ottawa		Beveridge	N/A	Ottawa Auditorium	9–18–6	24
34	February 9	Ottawa	3–3	Rangers	OT	Beveridge	N/A	Madison Square Garden	9–18–7	25
35	February 14	Rangers	3–1	Ottawa		Beveridge	N/A	Ottawa Auditorium	9–19–7	25
36	February 16	Canadiens	6–0	Ottawa		Beveridge	N/A	Ottawa Auditorium	9–20–7	25
37	February 19	Ottawa	1–3	Americans		Beveridge	N/A	Madison Square Garden	9–21–7	25
38	February 23	Toronto	3–0	Ottawa		Beveridge	N/A	Ottawa Auditorium	9–22–7	25
39	February 28	Ottawa	0–0	Boston	OT	Beveridge	N/A	Boston Garden	9–22–8	26

March: 2–5–2 (home: 1–2–1; road: 1–3–1)

Game	Date	Visitor	Score	Home	OT	Decision	Attendance	Arena	Record	Pts
40	March 2	Detroit	3–2	Ottawa		Beveridge	N/A	Ottawa Auditorium	9–23–8	26
41	March 5	Ottawa	0–2	Detroit		Beveridge	N/A	Detroit Olympia	9–24–8	26
42	March 7	Ottawa	1–5	Chicago		Beveridge	N/A	Chicago Stadium	9–25–8	26
43	March 9	Chicago	3–3	Ottawa	OT	Beveridge	N/A	Ottawa Auditorium	9–25–9	27
44	March 11	Americans	1–2	Ottawa	OT	Beveridge	N/A	Ottawa Auditorium	10–25–9	29
45	March 14	Ottawa	3–3	Rangers	OT	Beveridge	N/A	Madison Square Garden	10–25–10	30
46	March 16	Maroons	5–4	Ottawa	OT	Beveridge	N/A	Ottawa Auditorium	10–26–10	30
47	March 18	Ottawa	2–6	Toronto		Beveridge	N/A	Maple Leaf Gardens	10–27–10	30
48	March 21	Ottawa	3–0	Maroons		Beveridge	N/A	Montreal Forum	11–27–10	32

Legend: Win (2 points) Loss (0 points) Tie (1 point)

== Player statistics ==
=== Regular season ===
Scoring

Player	Pos	GP	G	A	Pts	PIM
Cooney Weiland	C	48	16	11	27	4
Syd Howe	C/LW	48	12	12	24	17
Hec Kilrea	LW	47	14	8	22	26
Bill Touhey	LW	47	12	7	19	12
Frank Finnigan	RW	45	4	14	18	37
Gus Forslund	RW	48	4	9	13	2
Al Shields	D	48	7	4	11	119
Danny Cox	LW	47	4	7	11	8
Wally Kilrea	RW/C	32	4	5	9	14
Earl Roche	LW	20	4	5	9	6
Des Roche	RW	16	3	6	9	6
Bert McInenly	LW/D	30	2	2	4	8
Hib Milks	LW/C	16	0	3	3	0
Alex Smith	D	34	2	0	2	42
Leo Bourgeault	D	35	1	1	2	18
Harvey Rockburn	D	16	0	1	1	39
Bill Beveridge	G	35	0	0	0	0
Marty Burke	D	16	0	0	0	10
Bert Burry	D	4	0	0	0	0
Alec Connell	G	15	0	0	0	0
Dutch Gainor	C	2	0	0	0	0
Gerry Lowrey	LW	7	0	0	0	0
Harold Starr	D	31	0	0	0	30

Goaltending

Player	Min	GP	W	L	T	GA	GAA	SO
Bill Beveridge	2195	35	7	19	8	95	2.60	5
Alec Connell	845	15	4	8	2	36	2.56	1
Team:	3040	48	11	27	10	131	2.59	6

Note:

Pos = Position;GP = Games played; G = Goals; A = Assists; Pts = Points; PIM = Penalty minutes; +/- = Plus/minus; PPG = Power-play goals; SHG = Short-handed goals; GWG = Game-winning goals
Pos = Position;GP = Games played; Min, TOI = Minutes played; W = Wins; L = Losses; T,T/OT = Ties; OTL = Overtime losses; GA = Goals-against; GAA = Goals-against average; SO = Shutouts; SA = Shots against; SV = Shots saved;SV% = Save percentage;

== Transactions ==
The Senators were involved in the following transactions during the 1932–33 season.

=== Trades ===
July 25, 1932	To Ottawa Senators Cooney Weiland	To Boston Bruins Joe Lamb $7,000
October 19, 1932	To Ottawa Senators Bert McInenly	To New York Americans Cash
October 31, 1932	To Ottawa Senators Cash	To London Tecumsehs (IHL) Eric Pettinger
December 18, 1932	To Ottawa Senators Dutch Gainor	To New York Rangers Cash
January 25, 1933	To Ottawa Senators Earl Roche	To Boston Bruins Alex Smith
February 2, 1933	To Ottawa Senators Harvey Rockburn	To Montreal Maroons Cash
February 3, 1933	To Ottawa Senators Des Roche	To Montreal Maroons Wally Kilrea
February 14, 1933	To Ottawa Senators Marty Burke; Future considerations	To Montreal Canadiens Leo Bourgeault; Harold Starr
March 23, 1933	To Ottawa Senators Nick Wasnie	To Montreal Canadiens Marty Burke

=== Free agents signed ===
October 2, 1932	From New York Rangers Hib Milks
January 4, 1933	From St. Paul Greyhounds/Tulsa Oilers Gerry Lowrey

== See also ==
- 1932–33 NHL season

== References, Playoffs ==
- National Hockey League Guide & Record Book 2007. NHL. 2006.
- SHRP Sports
- The Internet Hockey Database
