= 1932–33 Montreal Canadiens season =

NHL hockey team season

1932–33 Montreal Canadiens
- Division: 3rd Canadian
- 1932–33 record: 18–25–5
- Home record: 15–5–4
- Road record: 3–20–1
- Goals for: 92
- Goals against: 115

Team information
- General manager: Leo Dandurand
- Coach: Newsy Lalonde
- Captain: George Hainsworth
- Arena: Montreal Forum

Team leaders
- Goals: Aurele Joliat (17)
- Assists: Johnny Gagnon (23)
- Points: Aurele Joliat (38)
- Penalty minutes: Johnny Gagnon (64)
- Wins: George Hainsworth (18)
- Goals against average: George Hainsworth (2.31)

The 1932–33 Montreal Canadiens season was the team's 24th season. The Canadiens again qualified for the playoffs, finishing third in their division. The club again met and lost to the New York Rangers in the playoffs.

The offseason led to changes in the Canadiens organization. First, a change occurred in the team ownership. Louis Letourneau, regarded as a positive influence on the team, "generous in his praise and encouragement" sold his interest in the Canadiens to his partners Leo Dandurand and Joe Cattarinich.

After the disappointing 1931–32 season, Cecil Hart faced pressure from fans to resign his position in favour of a French-Canadian. When Hart, an independent insurance broker, had signed on as coach, the season was four and a half months and 36 games. Now it was 48 games and seven months. A combination of the pressure, and the negative effects on his business, led him to resign in August 1932. Former Canadiens star Newsy Lalonde would take over as coach.

== Regular season ==
Economic conditions in Montreal, part of the Great Depression caused attendance to decline. Over 40,000 families and 150,000 individuals were receiving social assistance. The team would lose $20,000 on the season.

On the ice, the Canadiens under new coach Lalonde spent much of the season in last place, but managed to make the playoffs when they rallied to finish third. Howie Morenz, who had previously led the league in scoring, declined in production, and Aurel Joliat took over as the team leader in scoring.

=== Final standings ===
Canadian Division
	GP	W	L	T	GF	GA	PTS
**Toronto Maple Leafs**	48	24	18	6	119	111	54
**Montreal Maroons**	48	22	20	6	135	119	50
**Montreal Canadiens**	48	18	25	5	92	115	41
New York Americans	48	15	22	11	91	118	41
Ottawa Senators	48	11	27	10	88	131	32

Note: W = Wins, L = Losses, T = Ties, GF = Goals For, GA = Goals Against, Pts = Points
Teams that qualified for the playoffs are highlighted in bold.

=== Record vs. opponents ===
==== Vs. Canadian Division ====
1932–33 NHL records
Team	**MTL**	**MTM**	**NYA**	**OTT**	**TOR**	**Total**
M. Canadiens	—	2–3–1	2–3–1	4–2	3–3	**11–11–2**
M. Maroons	3–2–1	—	3–3	3–3	2–3–1	**11–11–2**
N.Y. Americans	3–2–1	3–3	—	2–3–1	3–2–1	**11–10–3**
Ottawa	2–4	3–3	3–2–1	—	0–6	**8–15–1**
Toronto	3–3	3–2–1	2–3–1	6–0	—	**14–8–2**

==== Vs. American Division ====
1932–33 NHL records
Team	**BOS**	**CHI**	**DET**	**NYR**	**Total**
M. Canadiens	1–4–1	3–3	2–3–1	1–4–1	**7–14–3**
M. Maroons	2–4	2–2–2	4–1–1	3–2–1	**11–9–4**
N.Y. Americans	2–2–2	2–2–2	0–3–3	2–3–1	**6–10–8**
Ottawa	1–3–2	1–2–3	1–4–1	0–3–3	**3–12–9**
Toronto	1–4–1	2–2–2	3–2–1	4–2	**10–10–4**

== Schedule and results ==
1932–33 regular season
November

Game	Result	Date	Score	Opponent	Record
1	L	November 12, 1932	0–4	Boston Bruins (1932–33)	0–1–0
2	W	November 17, 1932	1–0 OT	Detroit Red Wings (1932–33)	1–1–0
3	L	November 20, 1932	1–2	@ Chicago Black Hawks (1932–33)	1–2–0
4	L	November 22, 1932	2–4	@ Detroit Red Wings (1932–33)	1–3–0
5	L	November 24, 1932	0–2	@ Toronto Maple Leafs (1932–33)	1–4–0
6	W	November 26, 1932	2–1	Chicago Black Hawks (1932–33)	2–4–0

December

Game	Result	Date	Score	Opponent	Record
7	L	December 1, 1932	4–5 OT	Montreal Maroons (1932–33)	2–5–0
8	L	December 4, 1932	2–4	@ New York Americans (1932–33)	2–6–0
9	L	December 6, 1932	3–5	@ New York Rangers (1932–33)	2–7–0
10	L	December 8, 1932	0–2	@ Ottawa Senators (1932–33)	2–8–0
11	W	December 10, 1932	3–2 OT	Ottawa Senators (1932–33)	3–8–0
12	T	December 13, 1932	1–1 OT	New York Rangers (1932–33)	3–8–1
13	W	December 17, 1932	3–1	@ Montreal Maroons (1932–33)	4–8–1
14	L	December 20, 1932	1–2	Toronto Maple Leafs (1932–33)	4–9–1
15	W	December 24, 1932	4–0	New York Americans (1932–33)	5–9–1
16	L	December 27, 1932	0–1	@ Boston Bruins (1932–33)	5–10–1
17	T	December 29, 1932	3–3 OT	Detroit Red Wings (1932–33)	5–10–2

January

Game	Result	Date	Score	Opponent	Record
18	L	January 1, 1933	1–4	@ Chicago Black Hawks (1932–33)	5–11–2
19	L	January 5, 1933	1–6	@ Detroit Red Wings (1932–33)	5–12–2
20	W	January 7, 1933	1–0	Ottawa Senators (1932–33)	6–12–2
21	W	January 12, 1933	4–2	Chicago Black Hawks (1932–33)	7–12–2
22	L	January 17, 1933	2–3	@ Ottawa Senators (1932–33)	7–13–2
23	L	January 19, 1933	1–2	@ New York Rangers (1932–33)	7–14–2
24	W	January 21, 1933	5–2	Boston Bruins (1932–33)	8–14–2
25	L	January 24, 1933	2–3	@ Boston Bruins (1932–33)	8–15–2
26	T	January 26, 1933	1–1 OT	New York Americans (1932–33)	8–15–3
27	L	January 28, 1933	2–4	@ Toronto Maple Leafs (1932–33)	8–16–3
28	W	January 31, 1933	3–1 OT	Ottawa Senators (1932–33)	9–16–3

February

Game	Result	Date	Score	Opponent	Record
29	L	February 2, 1933	0–5	@ New York Americans (1932–33)	9–17–3
30	L	February 4, 1933	2–7	Montreal Maroons (1932–33)	9–18–3
31	W	February 7, 1933	2–0	Toronto Maple Leafs (1932–33)	10–18–3
32	L	February 12, 1933	0–2	@ Chicago Black Hawks (1932–33)	10–19–3
33	W	February 14, 1933	6–2	Detroit Red Wings (1932–33)	11–19–3
34	W	February 16, 1933	6–0	@ Ottawa Senators (1932–33)	12–19–3
35	L	February 18, 1933	1–3	New York Rangers (1932–33)	12–20–3
36	L	February 21, 1933	0–10	@ Boston Bruins (1932–33)	12–21–3
37	W	February 23, 1933	2–0	Chicago Black Hawks (1932–33)	13–21–3
38	T	February 25, 1933	2–2 OT	@ Montreal Maroons (1932–33)	13–21–4
39	W	February 28, 1933	2–1	@ Toronto Maple Leafs (1932–33)	14–21–4

March

Game	Result	Date	Score	Opponent	Record
40	W	March 2, 1933	4–3	Toronto Maple Leafs (1932–33)	15–21–4
41	W	March 4, 1933	2–0	New York Americans (1932–33)	16–21–4
42	L	March 7, 1933	1–2 OT	@ New York Americans (1932–33)	16–22–4
43	W	March 9, 1933	3–1	Montreal Maroons (1932–33)	17–22–4
44	L	March 12, 1933	1–3	@ Detroit Red Wings (1932–33)	17–23–4
45	L	March 14, 1933	1–2	@ Montreal Maroons (1932–33)	17–24–4
46	W	March 16, 1933	2–1	New York Rangers (1932–33)	18–24–4
47	T	March 18, 1933	0–0 OT	Boston Bruins (1932–33)	18–24–5
48	L	March 23, 1933	2–4	@ New York Rangers (1932–33)	18–25–5

Legend: Win (2 points) Loss (0 points) Tie (1 point)

== Playoffs ==
In the first round the Canadiens met the New York Rangers, who had placed third in the American Division. The Canadiens lost the two-games total-goals series 8–5.

=== New York Rangers vs. Montreal Canadiens ===
Date	Visitor	Home	Score	Record
March 26	Montreal Canadiens	New York Rangers	2–5	2–5
March 28	New York Rangers	Montreal Canadiens	3–3	5–8

== Player statistics ==
=== Regular season ===
==== Scoring ====
Player	Pos	GP	G	A	Pts	PIM
Aurel Joliat	LW	48	18	21	39	53
Howie Morenz	C	46	14	21	35	32
Johnny Gagnon	RW	48	12	23	35	64
Pit Lepine	C	46	8	8	16	45
Wildor Larochelle	RW	47	11	4	15	27
Sylvio Mantha	D	48	4	7	11	50
Georges Mantha	D/LW	43	3	6	9	10
Albert Leduc	D	48	5	3	8	62
Gerry Carson	D	48	5	2	7	53
Art Giroux	RW	40	5	2	7	14
Marty Burke	D	29	2	5	7	36
Leo Gaudreault	LW/C	24	2	2	4	2
Armand Mondou	LW	24	1	3	4	15
Gizzy Hart	LW	18	0	3	3	0
Leo Bourgeault	D	15	1	1	2	9
Hago Harrington	LW	24	1	1	2	2
Art Alexandre	LW	1	0	0	0	0
Len Grosvenor	C/RW	4	0	0	0	0
George Hainsworth	G	48	0	0	0	0
Walter McCartney	LW	2	0	0	0	0
Leo Murray	C/LW	6	0	0	0	2
Paul Raymond	RW	16	0	0	0	0
Harold Starr	D	15	0	0	0	6

==== Goaltending ====
Player	MIN	GP	W	L	T	GA	GAA	SO
George Hainsworth	2980	48	18	25	5	115	2.32	8
Team:	2980	48	18	25	5	115	2.32	8

=== Playoffs ===
==== Scoring ====
Player	Pos	GP	G	A	Pts	PIM
Aurel Joliat	LW	2	2	1	3	2
Howie Morenz	C	2	0	3	3	2
Johnny Gagnon	RW	2	0	2	2	0
Hago Harrington	LW	2	1	0	1	2
Wildor Larochelle	RW	2	1	0	1	0
Albert Leduc	D	2	1	0	1	2
Gizzy Hart	LW	2	0	1	1	0
Sylvio Mantha	D	2	0	1	1	2
Leo Bourgeault	D	2	0	0	0	0
Gerry Carson	D	2	0	0	0	2
Art Giroux	RW	2	0	0	0	0
Len Grosvenor	C/RW	2	0	0	0	0
George Hainsworth	G	2	0	0	0	0
Pit Lepine	C	2	0	0	0	2
Harold Starr	D	2	0	0	0	2

==== Goaltending ====
Player	MIN	GP	W	L	GA	GAA	SO
George Hainsworth	120	2	0	1	8	4.00	0
Team:	120	2	0	1	8	4.00	0

Note:

Pos = Position;GP = Games played; G = Goals; A = Assists; Pts = Points; PIM = Penalty minutes; +/- = Plus/minus; PPG = Power-play goals; SHG = Short-handed goals; GWG = Game-winning goals
Pos = Position;GP = Games played; Min, TOI = Minutes played; W = Wins; L = Losses; T,T/OT = Ties; OTL = Overtime losses; GA = Goals-against; GAA = Goals-against average; SO = Shutouts; SA = Shots against; SV = Shots saved;SV% = Save percentage;

== Transactions ==
- February 14, 1933. – Marty Burke was traded to Ottawa by Montreal with future considerations (Nick Wasnie, March 23, 1933) for Leo Bourgeault and Harold Starr.
- March 23, 1933 – Marty Burke was traded to Montreal by Ottawa for Nick Wasnie.

== See also ==
- 1932–33 NHL season
