= 1932–33 New York Americans season =

Ice hockey season

1932–33 New York Americans
- Division: 4th Canadian
- 1932–33 record: 15–22–11
- Home record: 13–6–5
- Road record: 2–16–6
- Goals for: 91
- Goals against: 118

Team information
- Coach: Joe Simpson
- Captain: Red Dutton
- Arena: Madison Square Garden

Team leaders
- Goals: Johnny Sheppard (17)
- Assists: Norman Himes (25)
- Points: Norman Himes (34)
- Penalty minutes: Vernon Ayres (74)
- Wins: Roy Worters (15)
- Goals against average: Jake Forbes (1.71)

The 1932–33 New York Americans season was the Americans' eighth season of playing ice hockey. The Americans again did not qualify for the playoffs. This was the fourth-straight season that they missed the playoffs and the seventh time out of eight seasons.

== Regular season ==
=== Final standings ===
Canadian Division
	GP	W	L	T	GF	GA	PTS
**Toronto Maple Leafs**	48	24	18	6	119	111	54
**Montreal Maroons**	48	22	20	6	135	119	50
**Montreal Canadiens**	48	18	25	5	92	115	41
New York Americans	48	15	22	11	91	118	41
Ottawa Senators	48	11	27	10	88	131	32

Note: W = Wins, L = Losses, T = Ties, GF = Goals For, GA = Goals Against, Pts = Points
Teams that qualified for the playoffs are highlighted in bold.

=== Record vs. opponents ===
==== Vs. Canadian Division ====
1932–33 NHL records
Team	**MTL**	**MTM**	**NYA**	**OTT**	**TOR**	**Total**
M. Canadiens	—	2–3–1	2–3–1	4–2	3–3	**11–11–2**
M. Maroons	3–2–1	—	3–3	3–3	2–3–1	**11–11–2**
N.Y. Americans	3–2–1	3–3	—	2–3–1	3–2–1	**11–10–3**
Ottawa	2–4	3–3	3–2–1	—	0–6	**8–15–1**
Toronto	3–3	3–2–1	2–3–1	6–0	—	**14–8–2**

==== Vs. American Division ====
1932–33 NHL records
Team	**BOS**	**CHI**	**DET**	**NYR**	**Total**
M. Canadiens	1–4–1	3–3	2–3–1	1–4–1	**7–14–3**
M. Maroons	2–4	2–2–2	4–1–1	3–2–1	**11–9–4**
N.Y. Americans	2–2–2	2–2–2	0–3–3	2–3–1	**6–10–8**
Ottawa	1–3–2	1–2–3	1–4–1	0–3–3	**3–12–9**
Toronto	1–4–1	2–2–2	3–2–1	4–2	**10–10–4**

== Schedule and results ==
1932–33 regular season
November

Game	Result	Date	Score	Opponent	Record
1	T	November 13, 1932	1–1 OT	@ Chicago Black Hawks (1932–33)	0–0–1
2	L	November 15, 1932	2–6	@ Detroit Red Wings (1932–33)	0–1–1
3	W	November 17, 1932	4–2	Boston Bruins (1932–33)	1–1–1
4	L	November 19, 1932	1–4 OT	@ Montreal Maroons (1932–33)	1–2–1
5	W	November 22, 1932	5–2	Montreal Maroons (1932–33)	2–2–1

December

Game	Result	Date	Score	Opponent	Record
6	L	December 1, 1932	3–4	@ Ottawa Senators (1932–33)	2–3–1
7	W	December 4, 1932	4–2	Montreal Canadiens (1932–33)	3–3–1
8	L	December 6, 1932	0–2 OT	@ Boston Bruins (1932–33)	3–4–1
9	L	December 8, 1932	1–3	@ New York Rangers (1932–33)	3–5–1
10	T	December 10, 1932	2–2 OT	@ Toronto Maple Leafs (1932–33)	3–5–2
11	L	December 13, 1932	0–2	Ottawa Senators (1932–33)	3–6–2
12	L	December 15, 1932	2–3	New York Rangers (1932–33)	3–7–2
13	T	December 18, 1932	0–0 OT	Chicago Black Hawks (1932–33)	3–7–3
14	W	December 22, 1932	1–0	Toronto Maple Leafs (1932–33)	4–7–3
15	L	December 24, 1932	0–4	@ Montreal Canadiens (1932–33)	4–8–3
16	L	December 27, 1932	1–3	Detroit Red Wings (1932–33)	4–9–3

January

Game	Result	Date	Score	Opponent	Record
17	W	January 1, 1933	5–4	Boston Bruins (1932–33)	5–9–3
18	T	January 3, 1933	0–0 OT	@ Boston Bruins (1932–33)	5–9–4
19	T	January 5, 1933	1–1 OT	Ottawa Senators (1932–33)	5–9–5
20	T	January 8, 1933	2–2 OT	@ New York Rangers (1932–33)	5–9–6
21	W	January 10, 1933	3–1	Chicago Black Hawks (1932–33)	6–9–6
22	W	January 12, 1933	5–2	@ Ottawa Senators (1932–33)	7–9–6
23	T	January 15, 1933	1–1 OT	Detroit Red Wings (1932–33)	7–9–7
24	W	January 17, 1933	3–1	Toronto Maple Leafs (1932–33)	8–9–7
25	L	January 19, 1933	0–6	@ Chicago Black Hawks (1932–33)	8–10–7
26	L	January 22, 1933	0–2	@ Detroit Red Wings (1932–33)	8–11–7
27	L	January 24, 1933	2–3	New York Rangers (1932–33)	8–12–7
28	T	January 26, 1933	1–1 OT	@ Montreal Canadiens (1932–33)	8–12–8
29	W	January 29, 1933	4–0	Chicago Black Hawks (1932–33)	9–12–8
30	L	January 31, 1933	1–7	@ Toronto Maple Leafs (1932–33)	9–13–8

February

Game	Result	Date	Score	Opponent	Record
31	W	February 2, 1933	5–0	Montreal Canadiens (1932–33)	10–13–8
32	L	February 5, 1933	1–4	@ New York Rangers (1932–33)	10–14–8
33	L	February 7, 1933	0–1	Montreal Maroons (1932–33)	10–15–8
34	T	February 12, 1933	2–2 OT	Detroit Red Wings (1932–33)	10–15–9
35	W	February 19, 1933	3–1	Ottawa Senators (1932–33)	11–15–9
36	L	February 21, 1933	1–5	@ Montreal Maroons (1932–33)	11–16–9
37	W	February 23, 1933	2–1 OT	Montreal Maroons (1932–33)	12–16–9
38	L	February 25, 1933	1–5	@ Toronto Maple Leafs (1932–33)	12–17–9
39	T	February 26, 1933	1–1 OT	@ Detroit Red Wings (1932–33)	12–17–10

March

Game	Result	Date	Score	Opponent	Record
40	L	March 2, 1933	2–3	@ Chicago Black Hawks (1932–33)	12–18–10
41	L	March 4, 1933	0–2	@ Montreal Canadiens (1932–33)	12–19–10
42	W	March 7, 1933	2–1 OT	Montreal Canadiens (1932–33)	13–19–10
43	L	March 9, 1933	2–4	@ Boston Bruins (1932–33)	13–20–10
44	L	March 11, 1933	1–2 OT	@ Ottawa Senators (1932–33)	13–21–10
45	L	March 12, 1933	2–8	New York Rangers (1932–33)	13–22–10
46	T	March 16, 1933	1–1 OT	Boston Bruins (1932–33)	13–22–11
47	W	March 21, 1933	4–3	Toronto Maple Leafs (1932–33)	14–22–11
48	W	March 23, 1933	6–3	@ Montreal Maroons (1932–33)	15–22–11

Legend: Win (2 points) Loss (0 points) Tie (1 point)

== Player statistics ==
=== Regular season ===
Scoring

Player	GP	G	A	Pts	PIM
Normie Himes	48	9	25	34	12
Johnny Sheppard	46	17	9	26	32
Nick Wasnie	48	11	12	23	36
George Patterson	41	12	7	19	26
Charley McVeigh	40	7	12	19	10
Bill Brydge	48	4	15	19	60
Walter Jackson	34	10	2	12	6
Ron Martin	47	5	7	12	6
Duke Dukowski	48	4	7	11	43
Merlyn Phillips	30	1	7	8	10
Wilf Starr	26	4	3	7	8
Tommy Filmore	34	1	4	5	9
Lloyd Klein	15	2	2	4	4
Eddie Burke	15	2	0	2	4
Gord Kuhn	12	1	1	2	4
Bill Regan	15	1	1	2	14
Red Dutton	43	0	2	2	74
John Keating	13	0	2	2	11
Eddie Convey	13	0	1	1	12
Vern Ayres	48	0	0	0	97
Jake Forbes	1	0	0	0	0
Joe Thorsteinson	4	0	0	0	0
Roy Worters	47	0	0	0	0

Goaltending

Player	MIN	GP	W	L	T	GA	GAA	SA	SV	SV%	SO
Roy Worters	2970	47	15	22	10	116	2.34				5
Jake Forbes	70	1	0	0	1	2	1.71				0
Team:	3040	48	15	22	11	118	2.33				5

== See also ==
- 1932–33 NHL season
