= 1932–33 Montreal Maroons season =

National Hockey League team season

1932–33 Montreal Maroons
- Division: 2nd Canadian
- 1932–33 record: 22–20–6
- Home record: 14–7–3
- Road record: 8–13–3
- Goals for: 135
- Goals against: 119

Team information
- General manager: Eddie Gerard
- Coach: Eddie Gerard
- Captain: Hooley Smith
- Arena: Montreal Forum

Team leaders
- Goals: Baldy Northcott (22)
- Assists: Paul Haynes (25)
- Points: Baldy Northcott (43)
- Penalty minutes: Hooley Smith (66)
- Wins: Dave Kerr (14)
- Goals against average: Dave Kerr (2.15)

The 1932–33 Montreal Maroons season was the ninth season for the National Hockey League (NHL) franchise.

== Offseason ==
Former coach Eddie Gerard as both General Manager and Coach of the team.

== Regular season ==
=== Final standings ===
Canadian Division
	GP	W	L	T	GF	GA	PTS
**Toronto Maple Leafs**	48	24	18	6	119	111	54
**Montreal Maroons**	48	22	20	6	135	119	50
**Montreal Canadiens**	48	18	25	5	92	115	41
New York Americans	48	15	22	11	91	118	41
Ottawa Senators	48	11	27	10	88	131	32

Note: W = Wins, L = Losses, T = Ties, GF = Goals For, GA = Goals Against, Pts = Points
Teams that qualified for the playoffs are highlighted in bold.

=== Record vs. opponents ===
==== Vs. Canadian Division ====
1932–33 NHL records
Team	**MTL**	**MTM**	**NYA**	**OTT**	**TOR**	**Total**
M. Canadiens	—	2–3–1	2–3–1	4–2	3–3	**11–11–2**
M. Maroons	3–2–1	—	3–3	3–3	2–3–1	**11–11–2**
N.Y. Americans	3–2–1	3–3	—	2–3–1	3–2–1	**11–10–3**
Ottawa	2–4	3–3	3–2–1	—	0–6	**8–15–1**
Toronto	3–3	3–2–1	2–3–1	6–0	—	**14–8–2**

==== Vs. American Division ====
1932–33 NHL records
Team	**BOS**	**CHI**	**DET**	**NYR**	**Total**
M. Canadiens	1–4–1	3–3	2–3–1	1–4–1	**7–14–3**
M. Maroons	2–4	2–2–2	4–1–1	3–2–1	**11–9–4**
N.Y. Americans	2–2–2	2–2–2	0–3–3	2–3–1	**6–10–8**
Ottawa	1–3–2	1–2–3	1–4–1	0–3–3	**3–12–9**
Toronto	1–4–1	2–2–2	3–2–1	4–2	**10–10–4**

== Schedule and results ==
1932–33 regular season
November

Game	Result	Date	Score	Opponent	Record
1	L	November 10, 1932	2–4	New York Rangers (1932–33)	0–1–0
2	W	November 12, 1932	2–1	@ Ottawa Senators (1932–33)	1–1–0
3	L	November 15, 1932	2–3	@ Boston Bruins (1932–33)	1–2–0
4	W	November 19, 1932	4–1 OT	New York Americans (1932–33)	2–2–0
5	L	November 22, 1932	2–5	@ New York Americans (1932–33)	2–3–0
6	L	November 24, 1932	3–6	Ottawa Senators (1932–33)	2–4–0
7	L	November 26, 1932	2–3	@ Toronto Maple Leafs (1932–33)	2–5–0
8	W	November 29, 1932	5–3	Detroit Red Wings (1932–33)	3–5–0

December

Game	Result	Date	Score	Opponent	Record
9	W	December 1, 1932	5–4 OT	@ Montreal Canadiens (1932–33)	4–5–0
10	W	December 3, 1932	2–0	Boston Bruins (1932–33)	5–5–0
11	W	December 8, 1932	1–0	Toronto Maple Leafs (1932–33)	6–5–0
12	T	December 11, 1932	2–2 OT	@ Chicago Black Hawks (1932–33)	6–5–1
13	W	December 13, 1932	7–4	@ Detroit Red Wings (1932–33)	7–5–1
14	L	December 17, 1932	1–3	Montreal Canadiens (1932–33)	7–6–1
15	L	December 22, 1932	1–4	Chicago Black Hawks (1932–33)	7–7–1
16	L	December 25, 1932	0–2	@ New York Rangers (1932–33)	7–8–1
17	L	December 27, 1932	0–3	@ Ottawa Senators (1932–33)	7–9–1
18	L	December 29, 1932	0–1	@ Toronto Maple Leafs (1932–33)	7–10–1
19	W	December 31, 1932	4–2	New York Rangers (1932–33)	8–10–1

January

Game	Result	Date	Score	Opponent	Record
20	T	January 5, 1933	2–2 OT	Toronto Maple Leafs (1932–33)	8–10–2
21	L	January 8, 1933	3–4	@ Chicago Black Hawks (1932–33)	8–11–2
22	L	January 12, 1933	0–4	@ Detroit Red Wings (1932–33)	8–12–2
23	L	January 14, 1933	2–3	Boston Bruins (1932–33)	8–13–2
24	L	January 17, 1933	2–6	@ Boston Bruins (1932–33)	8–14–2
25	W	January 19, 1933	7–3	Ottawa Senators (1932–33)	9–14–2
26	W	January 22, 1933	5–0	@ New York Rangers (1932–33)	10–14–2
27	W	January 24, 1933	3–0	Chicago Black Hawks (1932–33)	11–14–2
28	W	January 28, 1933	4–1	Detroit Red Wings (1932–33)	12–14–2

February

Game	Result	Date	Score	Opponent	Record
29	T	February 2, 1933	2–2 OT	New York Rangers (1932–33)	12–14–3
30	W	February 4, 1933	7–2	@ Montreal Canadiens (1932–33)	13–14–3
31	W	February 7, 1933	1–0	@ New York Americans (1932–33)	14–14–3
32	L	February 9, 1933	0–1	@ Boston Bruins (1932–33)	14–15–3
33	W	February 11, 1933	4–2	Boston Bruins (1932–33)	15–15–3
34	T	February 16, 1933	2–2 OT	@ Detroit Red Wings (1932–33)	15–15–4
35	T	February 19, 1933	0–0 OT	@ Chicago Black Hawks (1932–33)	15–15–5
36	W	February 21, 1933	5–1	New York Americans (1932–33)	16–15–5
37	L	February 23, 1933	1–2 OT	@ New York Americans (1932–33)	16–16–5
38	T	February 25, 1933	2–2 OT	Montreal Canadiens (1932–33)	16–16–6
39	W	February 28, 1933	6–3	Detroit Red Wings (1932–33)	17–16–6

March

Game	Result	Date	Score	Opponent	Record
40	L	March 4, 1933	2–4	@ Toronto Maple Leafs (1932–33)	17–17–6
41	W	March 7, 1933	7–2	Toronto Maple Leafs (1932–33)	18–17–6
42	L	March 9, 1933	1–3	@ Montreal Canadiens (1932–33)	18–18–6
43	W	March 11, 1933	6–2	Chicago Black Hawks (1932–33)	19–18–6
44	W	March 14, 1933	2–1	Montreal Canadiens (1932–33)	20–18–6
45	W	March 16, 1933	5–4 OT	@ Ottawa Senators (1932–33)	21–18–6
46	W	March 19, 1933	6–3	@ New York Rangers (1932–33)	22–18–6
47	L	March 21, 1933	0–3	Ottawa Senators (1932–33)	22–19–6
48	L	March 23, 1933	3–6	New York Americans (1932–33)	22–20–6

Legend: Win (2 points) Loss (0 points) Tie (1 point)

== Playoffs ==
They went against Detroit and lost 5 goals to 2, or 2–5.

== Player stats ==
=== Regular season ===
Scoring

Player	Pos	GP	G	A	Pts	PIM
Baldy Northcott	D/LW	48	22	21	43	30
Hooley Smith	C/RW	48	20	21	41	66
Paul Haynes	C	48	16	25	41	18
Jimmy Ward	RW	48	16	17	33	52
Dave Trottier	LW	48	16	15	31	38
Glenn Brydson	RW	48	11	17	28	26
Lionel Conacher	D	47	7	21	28	61
Earl Robinson	RW/C	44	15	9	24	6
Cy Wentworth	D	47	4	10	14	48
Lorne Duguid	LW	48	4	7	11	38
Wally Kilrea	RW/C	19	1	7	8	2
Hugh Plaxton	LW	15	1	2	3	4
Archie Wilcox	RW/D	47	0	3	3	37
John Gallagher	D	6	1	0	1	0
Andy Bellemer	D	15	0	0	0	0
Mickey Blake	LW/D	1	0	0	0	0
Dave Kerr	G	26	0	0	0	0
Stan McCabe	LW	1	0	0	0	0
Reg Noble	C/D	20	0	0	0	16
Merlyn Phillips	C	2	0	0	0	0
Des Roche	RW	5	0	0	0	0
Earl Roche	LW	5	0	0	0	0
Flat Walsh	G	22	0	0	0	0

Goaltending

Player	MIN	GP	W	L	T	GA	GAA	SO
Dave Kerr	1520	25	14	8	3	58	2.29	4
Flat Walsh	1303	22	8	11	3	56	2.58	2
Hugh Plaxton	57	1	0	1	0	5	5.26	0
Team:	2880	48	22	20	6	119	2.48	6

=== Playoffs ===
Scoring

Player	Pos	GP	G	A	Pts	PIM
Hooley Smith	C/RW	2	2	0	2	2
Lionel Conacher	D	2	0	1	1	0
Cy Wentworth	D	2	0	1	1	0
Glenn Brydson	RW	2	0	0	0	0
Lorne Duguid	LW	2	0	0	0	4
Paul Haynes	C	2	0	0	0	2
Dave Kerr	G	2	0	0	0	0
Wally Kilrea	RW/C	2	0	0	0	0
Reg Noble	C/D	2	0	0	0	2
Baldy Northcott	D/LW	2	0	0	0	4
Earl Robinson	RW/C	2	0	0	0	0
Dave Trottier	LW	2	0	0	0	6
Jimmy Ward	RW	2	0	0	0	0
Archie Wilcox	RW/D	2	0	0	0	0

Goaltending

Player	MIN	GP	W	L	GA	GAA	SO
Dave Kerr	120	2	0	2	5	2.50	0
Team:	120	2	0	2	5	2.50	0

Note: GP = Games played; G = Goals; A = Assists; Pts = Points; +/- = Plus/minus; PIM = Penalty minutes; PPG = Power-play goals; SHG = Short-handed goals; GWG = Game-winning goals
MIN=Minutes played; W = Wins; L = Losses; T = Ties; GA = Goals against; GAA = Goals against average; SO = Shutouts;

== See also ==
- 1932–33 NHL season
