= 1932–33 Boston Bruins season =

NHL team season

1932–33 Boston Bruins
- American Division champions
- Division: 1st American
- 1932–33 record: 25–15–8
- Home record: 20–2–3
- Road record: 5–13–5
- Goals for: 124
- Goals against: 88

Team information
- General manager: Art Ross
- Coach: Art Ross
- Captain: Dit Clapper
- Arena: Boston Garden

Team leaders
- Goals: Marty Barry (24)
- Assists: Eddie Shore (27)
- Points: Marty Barry (37)
- Penalty minutes: Eddie Shore (102)
- Wins: Tiny Thompson (25)
- Goals against average: Tiny Thompson (1.76)

The 1932–33 Boston Bruins season was the Bruins' ninth season in the NHL. The team won the division to qualify for the playoffs. The Bruins lost in the semi-finals to the Toronto Maple Leafs.

== Regular season ==
=== Final standings ===
American Division
| | GP | W | L | T | GF | GA | PTS |
|---|---|---|---|---|---|---|---|
| **Boston Bruins** | 48 | 25 | 15 | 8 | 124 | 88 | 58 |
| **Detroit Red Wings** | 48 | 25 | 15 | 8 | 111 | 93 | 58 |
| **New York Rangers** | 48 | 23 | 17 | 8 | 135 | 107 | 54 |
| Chicago Black Hawks | 48 | 16 | 20 | 12 | 88 | 101 | 44 |

Note: GP = Games Played, W = Wins, L = Losses, T = Ties, Pts = Points, GF = Goals For, GA = Goals Against
Teams that qualified for the playoffs are highlighted in bold.

=== Record vs. opponents ===
==== Vs. American Division ====
1932–33 NHL records
| Team | BOS | CHI | DET | NYR | Total |
|---|---|---|---|---|---|
| Boston | — | 3–2–1 | 2–3–1 | 3–3 | **8–8–2** |
| Chicago | 2–3–1 | — | 1–5 | 2–2–2 | **5–10–3** |
| Detroit | 3–2–1 | 5–1 | — | 4–2 | **12–5–1** |
| N.Y. Rangers | 3–3 | 2–2–2 | 2–4 | — | **7–9–2** |

==== Vs. Canadian Division ====
1932–33 NHL records
| Team | MTL | MTM | NYA | OTT | TOR | Total |
|---|---|---|---|---|---|---|
| Boston | 4–1–1 | 4–2 | 2–2–2 | 3–1–2 | 4–1–1 | **17–7–6** |
| Chicago | 3–3 | 2–2–2 | 2–2–2 | 2–1–3 | 2–2–2 | **11–10–9** |
| Detroit | 3–2–1 | 1–4–1 | 3–0–3 | 4–1–1 | 2–3–1 | **13–10–7** |
| N.Y. Rangers | 4–1–1 | 2–3–1 | 3–2–1 | 3–0–3 | 2–4 | **14–10–6** |

== Schedule and results ==
1932–33 regular season
November

| Game | Result | Date | Score | Opponent | Record |
|---|---|---|---|---|---|
| 1 | T | November 10, 1932 | 1–1 OT | @ Toronto Maple Leafs (1932–33) | 0–0–1 |
| 2 | W | November 12, 1932 | 4–0 | @ Montreal Canadiens (1932–33) | 1–0–1 |
| 3 | W | November 15, 1932 | 3–2 | Montreal Maroons (1932–33) | 2–0–1 |
| 4 | L | November 17, 1932 | 2–4 | @ New York Americans (1932–33) | 2–1–1 |
| 5 | W | November 22, 1932 | 5–1 | Chicago Black Hawks (1932–33) | 3–1–1 |
| 6 | W | November 26, 1932 | 6–4 | Ottawa Senators (1932–33) | 4–1–1 |
| 7 | L | November 29, 1932 | 4–6 | New York Rangers (1932–33) | 4–2–1 |

December

| Game | Result | Date | Score | Opponent | Record |
|---|---|---|---|---|---|
| 8 | L | December 3, 1932 | 0–2 | @ Montreal Maroons (1932–33) | 4–3–1 |
| 9 | W | December 6, 1932 | 2–0 OT | New York Americans (1932–33) | 5–3–1 |
| 10 | L | December 11, 1932 | 1–3 OT | @ New York Rangers (1932–33) | 5–4–1 |
| 11 | W | December 13, 1932 | 5–1 | Toronto Maple Leafs (1932–33) | 6–4–1 |
| 12 | W | December 15, 1932 | 1–0 | @ Chicago Black Hawks (1932–33) | 7–4–1 |
| 13 | L | December 18, 1932 | 1–2 | @ Detroit Red Wings (1932–33) | 7–5–1 |
| 14 | W | December 20, 1932 | 2–1 | Ottawa Senators (1932–33) | 8–5–1 |
| 15 | W | December 22, 1932 | 7–0 | Detroit Red Wings (1932–33) | 9–5–1 |
| 16 | T | December 24, 1932 | 1–1 OT | @ Ottawa Senators (1932–33) | 9–5–2 |
| 17 | W | December 27, 1932 | 1–0 | Montreal Canadiens (1932–33) | 10–5–2 |

January

| Game | Result | Date | Score | Opponent | Record |
|---|---|---|---|---|---|
| 18 | L | January 1, 1933 | 4–5 | @ New York Americans (1932–33) | 10–6–2 |
| 19 | T | January 3, 1933 | 0–0 OT | New York Americans (1932–33) | 10–6–3 |
| 20 | T | January 5, 1933 | 0–0 OT | @ Chicago Black Hawks (1932–33) | 10–6–4 |
| 21 | L | January 8, 1933 | 1–3 | @ Detroit Red Wings (1932–33) | 10–7–4 |
| 22 | W | January 10, 1933 | 3–2 OT | Ottawa Senators (1932–33) | 11–7–4 |
| 23 | L | January 12, 1933 | 1–3 | @ New York Rangers (1932–33) | 11–8–4 |
| 24 | W | January 14, 1933 | 3–2 | @ Montreal Maroons (1932–33) | 12–8–4 |
| 25 | W | January 17, 1933 | 6–2 | Montreal Maroons (1932–33) | 13–8–4 |
| 26 | L | January 19, 1933 | 0–3 | @ Toronto Maple Leafs (1932–33) | 13–9–4 |
| 27 | L | January 21, 1933 | 2–5 | @ Montreal Canadiens (1932–33) | 13–10–4 |
| 28 | W | January 24, 1933 | 3–2 | Montreal Canadiens (1932–33) | 14–10–4 |
| 29 | W | January 26, 1933 | 4–2 | Toronto Maple Leafs (1932–33) | 15–10–4 |
| 30 | L | January 31, 1933 | 1–5 | Chicago Black Hawks (1932–33) | 15–11–4 |

February

| Game | Result | Date | Score | Opponent | Record |
|---|---|---|---|---|---|
| 31 | T | February 2, 1933 | 1–1 OT | Detroit Red Wings (1932–33) | 15–11–5 |
| 32 | L | February 4, 1933 | 2–3 | @ Ottawa Senators (1932–33) | 15–12–5 |
| 33 | W | February 7, 1933 | 2–1 | New York Rangers (1932–33) | 16–12–5 |
| 34 | W | February 9, 1933 | 1–0 | Montreal Maroons (1932–33) | 17–12–5 |
| 35 | L | February 11, 1933 | 2–4 | @ Montreal Maroons (1932–33) | 17–13–5 |
| 36 | W | February 14, 1933 | 7–2 | Toronto Maple Leafs (1932–33) | 18–13–5 |
| 37 | L | February 16, 1933 | 1–2 | @ Chicago Black Hawks (1932–33) | 18–14–5 |
| 38 | L | February 19, 1933 | 1–2 | @ Detroit Red Wings (1932–33) | 18–15–5 |
| 39 | W | February 21, 1933 | 10–0 | Montreal Canadiens (1932–33) | 19–15–5 |
| 40 | T | February 28, 1933 | 0–0 OT | Ottawa Senators (1932–33) | 19–15–6 |

March

| Game | Result | Date | Score | Opponent | Record |
|---|---|---|---|---|---|
| 41 | W | March 5, 1933 | 2–1 | @ New York Rangers (1932–33) | 20–15–6 |
| 42 | W | March 7, 1933 | 4–1 | Detroit Red Wings (1932–33) | 21–15–6 |
| 43 | W | March 9, 1933 | 4–2 | New York Americans (1932–33) | 22–15–6 |
| 44 | W | March 11, 1933 | 6–2 | @ Toronto Maple Leafs (1932–33) | 23–15–6 |
| 45 | W | March 14, 1933 | 3–2 | Chicago Black Hawks (1932–33) | 24–15–6 |
| 46 | T | March 16, 1933 | 1–1 OT | @ New York Americans (1932–33) | 24–15–7 |
| 47 | T | March 18, 1933 | 0–0 OT | @ Montreal Canadiens (1932–33) | 24–15–8 |
| 48 | W | March 21, 1933 | 3–2 | New York Rangers (1932–33) | 25–15–8 |

Legend: Win (2 points) Loss (0 points) Tie (1 point)

== Playoffs ==
Under the playoff format of the era, the two divisional champions met in a best-of-five semifinal. Boston, the champions of the American Division, lost to the Toronto Maple Leafs (Canadian Division champions) in five games. The series is famous for the fifth game, played at Maple Leaf Gardens, which took six overtime periods to decide a winner. The game's only goal was scored Toronto's Ken Doraty at 4:46 of the sixth overtime. At the time it was the longest game ever played in NHL history and it remains the longest game ever played by either the Bruins or the Maple Leafs.

== Player statistics ==
=== Regular season ===
Scoring

| Player | Pos | GP | G | A | Pts | PIM |
|---|---|---|---|---|---|---|
| Marty Barry | C | 47 | 24 | 13 | 37 | 40 |
| Nels Stewart | C | 47 | 18 | 18 | 36 | 62 |
| Eddie Shore | D | 48 | 8 | 27 | 35 | 102 |
| Dit Clapper | RW/D | 48 | 14 | 14 | 28 | 42 |
| Red Beattie | LW | 48 | 8 | 12 | 20 | 12 |
| Joe Lamb | RW | 42 | 11 | 8 | 19 | 68 |
| Harry Oliver | RW | 47 | 11 | 7 | 18 | 10 |
| Obs Heximer | LW/C | 48 | 7 | 5 | 12 | 12 |
| Alex Smith | D | 15 | 5 | 4 | 9 | 30 |
| Art Chapman | C | 46 | 3 | 6 | 9 | 19 |
| George Owen | D | 34 | 6 | 2 | 8 | 10 |
| Frank Jerwa | LW/D | 31 | 3 | 4 | 7 | 23 |
| Vic Ripley | LW | 23 | 2 | 5 | 7 | 21 |
| Billy Burch | C/LW | 23 | 3 | 1 | 4 | 4 |
| Percy Galbraith | LW/D | 47 | 1 | 2 | 3 | 28 |
| Lionel Hitchman | D | 45 | 0 | 1 | 1 | 34 |
| Tommy Filmore | RW | 1 | 0 | 0 | 0 | 0 |
| Earl Roche | LW | 3 | 0 | 0 | 0 | 0 |
| Tiny Thompson | G | 48 | 0 | 0 | 0 | 0 |

Goaltending

| Player | MIN | GP | W | L | T | GA | GAA | SO |
|---|---|---|---|---|---|---|---|---|
| Tiny Thompson | 3000 | 48 | 25 | 15 | 8 | 88 | 1.76 | 11 |
| Team: | 3000 | 48 | 25 | 15 | 8 | 88 | 1.76 | 11 |

=== Playoffs ===
Scoring

| Player | Pos | GP | G | A | Pts | PIM |
|---|---|---|---|---|---|---|
| Marty Barry | C | 5 | 2 | 2 | 4 | 6 |
| Nels Stewart | C | 5 | 2 | 0 | 2 | 4 |
| Dit Clapper | RW/D | 5 | 1 | 1 | 2 | 2 |
| Alex Smith | D | 5 | 0 | 2 | 2 | 6 |
| Vic Ripley | LW | 5 | 1 | 0 | 1 | 0 |
| Eddie Shore | D | 5 | 1 | 0 | 1 | 14 |
| Lionel Hitchman | D | 5 | 0 | 1 | 1 | 0 |
| Joe Lamb | RW | 5 | 0 | 1 | 1 | 6 |
| Red Beattie | LW | 5 | 0 | 0 | 0 | 2 |
| Art Chapman | C | 5 | 0 | 0 | 0 | 2 |
| Percy Galbraith | LW/D | 5 | 0 | 0 | 0 | 0 |
| Obs Heximer | LW/C | 5 | 0 | 0 | 0 | 2 |
| Harry Oliver | RW | 5 | 0 | 0 | 0 | 0 |
| George Owen | D | 5 | 0 | 0 | 0 | 6 |
| Tiny Thompson | G | 5 | 0 | 0 | 0 | 0 |

Goaltending

| Player | MIN | GP | W | L | GA | GAA | SO |
|---|---|---|---|---|---|---|---|
| Tiny Thompson | 438 | 5 | 2 | 3 | 9 | 1.23 | 0 |
| Team: | 438 | 5 | 2 | 3 | 9 | 1.23 | 0 |

Note:

Pos = Position;GP = Games played; G = Goals; A = Assists; Pts = Points; PIM = Penalty minutes; +/- = Plus/minus; PPG = Power-play goals; SHG = Short-handed goals; GWG = Game-winning goals
Pos = Position;GP = Games played; Min, TOI = Minutes played; W = Wins; L = Losses; T,T/OT = Ties; OTL = Overtime losses; GA = Goals-against; GAA = Goals-against average; SO = Shutouts; SA = Shots against; SV = Shots saved;SV% = Save percentage;

== See also ==
- 1932–33 NHL season
