= 1932–33 Toronto Maple Leafs season =

NHL hockey team season

1932–33 Toronto Maple Leafs
- O'Brien Trophy winners
- Division: 1st Canadian
- 1932–33 record: 24–18–6
- Home record: 16–4–4
- Road record: 8–14–2
- Goals for: 119
- Goals against: 111

Team information
- General manager: Conn Smythe
- Coach: Dick Irvin
- Captain: Hap Day
- Alternate captains: None
- Arena: Maple Leaf Gardens

Team leaders
- Goals: Busher Jackson (27)
- Assists: Joe Primeau (21)
- Points: Busher Jackson (44)
- Penalty minutes: Red Horner (144)
- Wins: Lorne Chabot (24)
- Goals against average: Lorne Chabot (2.26)

The 1932–33 Toronto Maple Leafs season was the team's 16th season in the National Hockey League (NHL).

== Regular season ==
=== Final standings ===
Canadian Division
	GP	W	L	T	GF	GA	PTS
**Toronto Maple Leafs**	48	24	18	6	119	111	54
**Montreal Maroons**	48	22	20	6	135	119	50
**Montreal Canadiens**	48	18	25	5	92	115	41
New York Americans	48	15	22	11	91	118	41
Ottawa Senators	48	11	27	10	88	131	32

Note: W = Wins, L = Losses, T = Ties, GF = Goals For, GA = Goals Against, Pts = Points
Teams that qualified for the playoffs are highlighted in bold.

=== Record vs. opponents ===
==== Vs. Canadian Division ====
1932–33 NHL records
Team	MTL	MTM	NYA	OTT	TOR	Total
M. Canadiens	—	2–3–1	2–3–1	4–2	3–3	**11–11–2**
M. Maroons	3–2–1	—	3–3	3–3	2–3–1	**11–11–2**
N.Y. Americans	3–2–1	3–3	—	2–3–1	3–2–1	**11–10–3**
Ottawa	2–4	3–3	3–2–1	—	0–6	**8–15–1**
Toronto	3–3	3–2–1	2–3–1	6–0	—	**14–8–2**

==== Vs. American Division ====
1932–33 NHL records
Team	BOS	CHI	DET	NYR	Total
M. Canadiens	1–4–1	3–3	2–3–1	1–4–1	**7–14–3**
M. Maroons	2–4	2–2–2	4–1–1	3–2–1	**11–9–4**
N.Y. Americans	2–2–2	2–2–2	0–3–3	2–3–1	**6–10–8**
Ottawa	1–3–2	1–2–3	1–4–1	0–3–3	**3–12–9**
Toronto	1–4–1	2–2–2	3–2–1	4–2	**10–10–4**

== Schedule and results ==
1932–33 regular season
November

Game	Result	Date	Score	Opponent	Record
1	T	November 10, 1932	1–1 OT	Boston Bruins (1932–33)	0–0–1
2	W	November 12, 1932	4–2	New York Rangers (1932–33)	1–0–1
3	L	November 17, 1932	1–3	@ Chicago Black Hawks (1932–33)	1–1–1
4	L	November 20, 1932	0–7	@ New York Rangers (1932–33)	1–2–1
5	W	November 24, 1932	2–0	Montreal Canadiens (1932–33)	2–2–1
6	W	November 26, 1932	3–2	Montreal Maroons (1932–33)	3–2–1
7	W	November 27, 1932	2–1	@ Detroit Red Wings (1932–33)	4–2–1

December

Game	Result	Date	Score	Opponent	Record
8	W	December 3, 1932	4–1	Ottawa Senators (1932–33)	5–2–1
9	L	December 8, 1932	0–1	@ Montreal Maroons (1932–33)	5–3–1
10	T	December 10, 1932	2–2 OT	New York Americans (1932–33)	5–3–2
11	L	December 13, 1932	1–5	@ Boston Bruins (1932–33)	5–4–2
12	W	December 15, 1932	4–1	Ottawa Senators (1932–33)	6–4–2
13	W	December 17, 1932	3–0	Detroit Red Wings (1932–33)	7–4–2
14	W	December 20, 1932	2–1	@ Montreal Canadiens (1932–33)	8–4–2
15	L	December 22, 1932	0–1	@ New York Americans (1932–33)	8–5–2
16	L	December 24, 1932	1–2	Chicago Black Hawks (1932–33)	8–6–2
17	W	December 27, 1932	4–3	@ Chicago Black Hawks (1932–33)	9–6–2
18	W	December 29, 1932	1–0	Montreal Maroons (1932–33)	10–6–2

January

Game	Result	Date	Score	Opponent	Record
19	T	January 1, 1933	2–2 OT	@ Detroit Red Wings (1932–33)	10–6–3
20	L	January 3, 1933	2–4	@ New York Rangers (1932–33)	10–7–3
21	T	January 5, 1933	2–2 OT	@ Montreal Maroons (1932–33)	10–7–4
22	L	January 7, 1933	1–6	Detroit Red Wings (1932–33)	10–8–4
23	W	January 10, 1933	3–2	New York Rangers (1932–33)	11–8–4
24	W	January 14, 1933	5–3 OT	@ Ottawa Senators (1932–33)	12–8–4
25	L	January 17, 1933	1–3	@ New York Americans (1932–33)	12–9–4
26	W	January 19, 1933	3–0	Boston Bruins (1932–33)	13–9–4
27	W	January 24, 1933	4–2	@ Ottawa Senators (1932–33)	14–9–4
28	L	January 26, 1933	2–4	@ Boston Bruins (1932–33)	14–10–4
29	W	January 28, 1933	4–2	Montreal Canadiens (1932–33)	15–10–4
30	W	January 31, 1933	7–1	New York Americans (1932–33)	16–10–4

February

Game	Result	Date	Score	Opponent	Record
31	T	February 4, 1933	2–2 OT	Chicago Black Hawks (1932–33)	16–10–5
32	L	February 7, 1933	0–2	@ Montreal Canadiens (1932–33)	16–11–5
33	W	February 11, 1933	2–1	New York Rangers (1932–33)	17–11–5
34	L	February 14, 1933	2–7	@ Boston Bruins (1932–33)	17–12–5
35	W	February 16, 1933	5–2	@ New York Rangers (1932–33)	18–12–5
36	W	February 18, 1933	4–1	Detroit Red Wings (1932–33)	19–12–5
37	W	February 23, 1933	3–0	@ Ottawa Senators (1932–33)	20–12–5
38	W	February 25, 1933	5–1	New York Americans (1932–33)	21–12–5
39	L	February 28, 1933	1–2	Montreal Canadiens (1932–33)	21–13–5

March

Game	Result	Date	Score	Opponent	Record
40	L	March 2, 1933	3–4	@ Montreal Canadiens (1932–33)	21–14–5
41	W	March 4, 1933	4–2	Montreal Maroons (1932–33)	22–14–5
42	W	March 5, 1933	2–1	@ Chicago Black Hawks (1932–33)	23–14–5
43	L	March 7, 1933	2–7	@ Montreal Maroons (1932–33)	23–15–5
44	L	March 11, 1933	2–6	Boston Bruins (1932–33)	23–16–5
45	L	March 16, 1933	0–1	@ Detroit Red Wings (1932–33)	23–17–5
46	W	March 18, 1933	6–2	Ottawa Senators (1932–33)	24–17–5
47	L	March 21, 1933	3–4	@ New York Americans (1932–33)	24–18–5
48	T	March 23, 1933	2–2 OT	Chicago Black Hawks (1932–33)	24–18–6

Legend: Win (2 points) Loss (0 points) Tie (1 point)

== Player statistics ==
=== Regular season ===
Scoring

Player	Pos	GP	G	A	Pts	PIM
Busher Jackson	LW	48	27	17	44	43
Charlie Conacher	RW	40	14	19	33	64
Joe Primeau	C	48	11	21	32	4
King Clancy	D	48	13	12	25	79
Bob Gracie	C/LW	48	9	13	22	27
Baldy Cotton	LW	48	10	11	21	29
Hap Day	D	47	6	14	20	46
Ace Bailey	RW	47	10	8	18	52
Ken Doraty	F	38	5	11	16	16
Andy Blair	C	43	6	9	15	38
Bill Thoms	C	29	3	9	12	15
Red Horner	D	48	3	8	11	144
Alex Levinsky	D	48	1	4	5	61
Harold Darragh	LW	19	1	2	3	0
Charlie Sands	C/RW	3	0	3	3	0
Stew Adams	LW	8	0	2	2	0
Dave Downie	C/RW	11	0	1	1	2
Lorne Chabot	G	48	0	0	0	4

Goaltending

Player	MIN	GP	W	L	T	GA	GAA	SO
Lorne Chabot	2946	48	24	18	6	111	2.26	5
Charlie Conacher	4	2	0	0	0	0	0.00	0
Team:	2950	48	24	18	6	111	2.26	5

=== Playoffs ===
Scoring

Player	Pos	GP	G	A	Pts	PIM
Ken Doraty	F	9	5	0	5	2
Busher Jackson	LW	9	3	1	4	2
Charlie Sands	C/RW	9	2	2	4	2
King Clancy	D	9	0	3	3	14
Baldy Cotton	LW	9	0	3	3	6
Charlie Conacher	RW	9	1	1	2	10
Bill Thoms	C	9	1	1	2	4
Andy Blair	C	9	0	2	2	4
Red Horner	D	9	1	0	1	10
Alex Levinsky	D	9	1	0	1	14
Ace Bailey	RW	8	0	1	1	4
Hap Day	D	9	0	1	1	21
Bob Gracie	C/LW	9	0	1	1	0
Joe Primeau	C	8	0	1	1	4
Buzz Boll	LW	1	0	0	0	0
Lorne Chabot	G	9	0	0	0	0

Goaltending

Player	MIN	GP	W	L	GA	GAA	SO
Lorne Chabot	686	9	4	5	18	1.57	2
Team:	686	9	4	5	18	1.57	2

Note:

Pos = Position;GP = Games played; G = Goals; A = Assists; Pts = Points; PIM = Penalty minutes; +/- = Plus/minus; PPG = Power-play goals; SHG = Short-handed goals; GWG = Game-winning goals
Pos = Position;GP = Games played; Min, TOI = Minutes played; W = Wins; L = Losses; T,T/OT = Ties; OTL = Overtime losses; GA = Goals-against; GAA = Goals-against average; SO = Shutouts; SA = Shots against; SV = Shots saved;SV% = Save percentage;

== Playoffs ==
The Maple Leafs met the Boston Bruins in the second round in a best of five series and won 3–2. In the finals, they lost to the Rangers in a best of five series 3–1.

Date	Away	Score	Home	Score	Notes
April 4	Toronto	1	New York	5	
April 8	New York	3	Toronto	1	
April 11	New York	2	Toronto	3	
April 13	New York	1	Toronto	0	OT

New York wins best-of-five series 3–1.

== Awards and records ==
- King Clancy, Defence, Second Team NHL All-Star
- Charlie Conacher, Right Wing, Second Team NHL All-Star
- Busher Jackson, Left Wing, Second Team NHL All-Star
- Dick Irvin, Coach, Second Team NHL All-Star

== Transactions ==
- January 3, 1933: Acquired Bill Thoms from the Boston Bruins for Harold Darragh

== See also ==
- 1932–33 NHL season
