= 1932–33 Detroit Red Wings season =

National Hockey League team season

1932–33 Detroit Red Wings
- Division: 2nd American
- 1932–33 record: 25–15–8
- Home record: 17–3–4
- Road record: 8–12–4
- Goals for: 111
- Goals against: 93

Team information
- General manager: Jack Adams
- Coach: Jack Adams
- Captain: Larry Aurie
- Arena: Detroit Olympia

Team leaders
- Goals: Herbie Lewis (20)
- Assists: Herbie Lewis (14); Carl Voss (15)
- Points: Herbie Lewis (34)
- Penalty minutes: Stewart Evans (74)
- Wins: John Ross Roach (25)
- Goals against average: John Ross Roach (1.88)

The 1932–33 Detroit Red Wings season was the first season under the newly named Detroit Red Wings name, seventh of the franchise. The Red Wings qualified for the playoffs and defeated the Montreal Maroons before losing to the New York Rangers in the playoff semi-finals.

== Regular season ==
=== Final standings ===
American Division
	GP	W	L	T	GF	GA	PTS
**Boston Bruins**	48	25	15	8	124	88	58
**Detroit Red Wings**	48	25	15	8	111	93	58
**New York Rangers**	48	23	17	8	135	107	54
Chicago Black Hawks	48	16	20	12	88	101	44

Note: GP = Games Played, W = Wins, L = Losses, T = Ties, Pts = Points, GF = Goals For, GA = Goals Against
Teams that qualified for the playoffs are highlighted in bold.

=== Record vs. opponents ===
==== Vs. American Division ====
1932–33 NHL records
Team	**BOS**	**CHI**	**DET**	**NYR**	**Total**
Boston	—	3–2–1	2–3–1	3–3	**8–8–2**
Chicago	2–3–1	—	1–5	2–2–2	**5–10–3**
Detroit	3–2–1	5–1	—	4–2	**12–5–1**
N.Y. Rangers	3–3	2–2–2	2–4	—	**7–9–2**

==== Vs. Canadian Division ====
1932–33 NHL records
Team	**MTL**	**MTM**	**NYA**	**OTT**	**TOR**	**Total**
Boston	4–1–1	4–2	2–2–2	3–1–2	4–1–1	**17–7–6**
Chicago	3–3	2–2–2	2–2–2	2–1–3	2–2–2	**11–10–9**
Detroit	3–2–1	1–4–1	3–0–3	4–1–1	2–3–1	**13–10–7**
N.Y. Rangers	4–1–1	2–3–1	3–2–1	3–0–3	2–4	**14–10–6**

== Schedule and results ==
1932–33 regular season
November

Game	Result	Date	Score	Opponent	Record
1	W	November 10, 1932	3–1	Chicago Black Hawks (1932–33)	1–0–0
2	W	November 15, 1932	6–2	New York Americans (1932–33)	2–0–0
3	L	November 17, 1932	0–1 OT	@ Montreal Canadiens (1932–33)	2–1–0
4	L	November 19, 1932	0–2	@ Ottawa Senators (1932–33)	2–2–0
5	W	November 22, 1932	4–2	Montreal Canadiens (1932–33)	3–2–0
6	L	November 27, 1932	1–2	Toronto Maple Leafs (1932–33)	3–3–0
7	L	November 29, 1932	3–5	@ Montreal Maroons (1932–33)	3–4–0

December

Game	Result	Date	Score	Opponent	Record
8	L	December 1, 1932	2–4	New York Rangers (1932–33)	3–5–0
9	W	December 4, 1932	2–0	Ottawa Senators (1932–33)	4–5–0
10	L	December 8, 1932	1–3	@ Chicago Black Hawks (1932–33)	4–6–0
11	L	December 13, 1932	4–7	Montreal Maroons (1932–33)	4–7–0
12	L	December 17, 1932	0–3	@ Toronto Maple Leafs (1932–33)	4–8–0
13	W	December 18, 1932	2–1	Boston Bruins (1932–33)	5–8–0
14	W	December 20, 1932	4–1	@ New York Rangers (1932–33)	6–8–0
15	L	December 22, 1932	0–7	@ Boston Bruins (1932–33)	6–9–0
16	W	December 25, 1932	4–0	Chicago Black Hawks (1932–33)	7–9–0
17	W	December 27, 1932	3–1	@ New York Americans (1932–33)	8–9–0
18	T	December 29, 1932	3–3 OT	@ Montreal Canadiens (1932–33)	8–9–1

January

Game	Result	Date	Score	Opponent	Record
19	T	January 1, 1933	2–2 OT	Toronto Maple Leafs (1932–33)	8–9–2
20	W	January 3, 1933	1–0	@ Ottawa Senators (1932–33)	9–9–2
21	W	January 5, 1933	6–1	Montreal Canadiens (1932–33)	10–9–2
22	W	January 7, 1933	6–1	@ Toronto Maple Leafs (1932–33)	11–9–2
23	W	January 8, 1933	3–1	Boston Bruins (1932–33)	12–9–2
24	W	January 12, 1933	4–0	Montreal Maroons (1932–33)	13–9–2
25	T	January 15, 1933	1–1 OT	@ New York Americans (1932–33)	13–9–3
26	W	January 17, 1933	2–0	New York Rangers (1932–33)	14–9–3
27	W	January 22, 1933	2–0	New York Americans (1932–33)	15–9–3
28	T	January 26, 1933	1–1 OT	Ottawa Senators (1932–33)	15–9–4
29	L	January 28, 1933	1–4	@ Montreal Maroons (1932–33)	15–10–4
30	W	January 31, 1933	2–1	@ New York Rangers (1932–33)	16–10–4

February

Game	Result	Date	Score	Opponent	Record
31	T	February 2, 1933	1–1 OT	@ Boston Bruins (1932–33)	16–10–5
32	W	February 5, 1933	1–0	Chicago Black Hawks (1932–33)	17–10–5
33	W	February 9, 1933	4–1	@ Chicago Black Hawks (1932–33)	18–10–5
34	T	February 12, 1933	2–2 OT	@ New York Americans (1932–33)	18–10–6
35	L	February 14, 1933	2–6	@ Montreal Canadiens (1932–33)	18–11–6
36	T	February 16, 1933	2–2 OT	Montreal Maroons (1932–33)	18–11–7
37	L	February 18, 1933	1–4	@ Toronto Maple Leafs (1932–33)	18–12–7
38	W	February 19, 1933	2–1	Boston Bruins (1932–33)	19–12–7
39	W	February 23, 1933	3–0	New York Rangers (1932–33)	20–12–7
40	T	February 26, 1933	1–1 OT	New York Americans (1932–33)	20–12–8
41	L	February 28, 1933	3–6	@ Montreal Maroons (1932–33)	20–13–8

March

Game	Result	Date	Score	Opponent	Record
42	W	March 2, 1933	3–2	@ Ottawa Senators (1932–33)	21–13–8
43	W	March 5, 1933	2–0	Ottawa Senators (1932–33)	22–13–8
44	L	March 7, 1933	1–4	@ Boston Bruins (1932–33)	22–14–8
45	L	March 9, 1933	2–3	@ New York Rangers (1932–33)	22–15–8
46	W	March 12, 1933	3–1	Montreal Canadiens (1932–33)	23–15–8
47	W	March 16, 1933	1–0	Toronto Maple Leafs (1932–33)	24–15–8
48	W	March 19, 1933	4–2	@ Chicago Black Hawks (1932–33)	25–15–8

Legend: Win (2 points) Loss (0 points) Tie (1 point)

== Playoffs ==
=== (C2) Montreal Maroons vs. (A2) Detroit Red Wings ===
Detroit Red Wings vs Montreal Maroons
Score	Visitors	Score	Home	Score
Mar 25	Detroit	2	Montreal M.	0
Mar 27	Montreal M.	2	Detroit	3

Detroit wins a total goal series 5 goals to 2.

=== (A2) Detroit Red Wings vs. (A3) New York Rangers ===
Detroit Red Wings vs New York Rangers
Date	Visitors	Score	Home	Score
Mar 30	Detroit	0	New York R.	2
Apr 2	New York R.	4	Detroit	3

New York R. wins a total goal series 6 goals to 3.

== Player statistics ==
=== Regular season ===
Scoring

Player	Pos	GP	G	A	Pts	PIM
Herbie Lewis	LW	48	20	14	34	20
Frank Carson	RW	45	12	13	25	35
John Sorrell	LW	47	14	10	24	11
Larry Aurie	RW	45	12	11	23	25
Hap Emms	LW/D	43	9	13	22	63
Ebbie Goodfellow	C/D	41	12	8	20	47
Carl Voss	C	38	6	14	20	6
Eddie Wiseman	RW	43	8	8	16	16
Doug Young	D	48	5	6	11	59
John Gallagher	D	35	3	6	9	48
Leroy Goldsworthy	RW	25	3	6	9	6
Stewart Evans	D	48	2	6	8	74
George Hay	LW	34	1	6	7	6
Walt Buswell	D	46	2	4	6	16
Gus Marker	RW	13	1	1	2	8
Ron Moffat	LW	24	1	1	2	6
Bob Davis	RW	3	0	0	0	0
Emil Hanson	RW/D	7	0	0	0	6
Reg Noble	C/D	5	0	0	0	6
Jack Riley	C	1	0	0	0	0
John Ross Roach	G	48	0	0	0	0

Goaltending

Player	MIN	GP	W	L	T	GA	GAA	SO
John Ross Roach	2970	48	25	15	8	93	1.88	10
Team:	2970	48	25	15	8	93	1.88	10

=== Playoffs ===
Scoring

Player	Pos	GP	G	A	Pts	PIM
John Sorrell	LW	4	2	2	4	4
John Gallagher	D	4	1	1	2	4
Carl Voss	C	4	1	1	2	0
Doug Young	D	4	1	1	2	0
Larry Aurie	RW	4	1	0	1	4
Ebbie Goodfellow	C/D	4	1	0	1	11
Herbie Lewis	LW	4	1	0	1	0
Frank Carson	RW	4	0	1	1	0
George Hay	LW	4	0	1	1	0
Walt Buswell	D	4	0	0	0	4
Hap Emms	LW/D	4	0	0	0	8
Stewart Evans	D	4	0	0	0	6
Leroy Goldsworthy	RW	2	0	0	0	0
Ron Moffat	LW	4	0	0	0	0
John Ross Roach	G	4	0	0	0	0
Eddie Wiseman	RW	2	0	0	0	0

Goaltending

Player	MIN	GP	W	L	GA	GAA	SO
John Ross Roach	240	4	2	2	8	2.00	1
Team:	240	4	2	2	8	2.00	1

Note: Pos = Position; GP = Games played; G = Goals; A = Assists; Pts = Points; PIM = Penalty minutes; PPG = Power-play goals; SHG = Short-handed goals; GWG = Game-winning goals
MIN = Minutes played; W = Wins; L = Losses; T = Ties; GA = Goals-against; GAA = Goals-against average; SO = Shutouts;

== See also ==
- 1932–33 NHL season
