= Rockburn =

Rockburn is a surname. Notable people with the surname include:

- Harvey Rockburn (1904–1977), Canadian ice hockey player
- Ken Rockburn (born 1947), Canadian radio and television journalist and host
