= Gus Forslund =

Swedish-born Canadian ice hockey player

- Born: April 25, 1908 Holmsund, Sweden
- Died: August 4, 1962 (aged 54) Geraldton, Ontario, Canada
- Height: 5 ft 10 in (178 cm)
- Weight: 150 lb (68 kg; 10 st 10 lb)
- Position: Right wing
- Shot: Right
- Played for: Ottawa Senators
- Playing career: 1926–1941

Gustaf Oliver Forslund (April 25, 1908 – August 4, 1962) was a Swedish-born Canadian professional ice hockey right wing player. In the 1932–33 season, he became the first Swedish-born player in the National Hockey League, and played 48 games for the Ottawa Senators. The rest of his career, which lasted from 1926 to 1941, was spent in various minor leagues.

== Early life ==
Gustaf Forslund was born in Holmsund in Västerbotten, Sweden to Lars Anton Forslund and his wife Ida Maria Fällman. When he was still a child, his family moved to Fort William and later Port Arthur, Ontario.

== Playing career ==
First playing professional hockey for the Port Arthur Ports at age 20, he transferred to the Fort William Forts one year later. In 1929 he moved to Minnesota to play for the Duluth Hornets of the American Hockey Association (1926–1942). Playing 48 games for the Ottawa Senators in 1932–33, Forslund became the first Swede to play in the NHL. He scored a total of 13 points, 4 goals and 9 assists.

He went on to play for the Windsor Bulldogs of the International Hockey League (1929–1936) and the Philadelphia Arrows and New Haven Eagles in the Can-Am Hockey League. He ended his career playing in the Thunder Bay Senior League until 1941. In 1939–40, Forslund led the Thunder Bay Senior League with 39 points in 24 games.

== After hockey ==
After retiring, Forslund helped organise youth hockey. After his wife died at 39, he was left to raise their two children alone. He died from a stroke in 1962 when he was 54.

== Career statistics ==
=== Regular season and playoffs ===
			Regular season					Playoffs
Season	Team	League	GP	G	A	Pts	PIM	GP	G	A	Pts	PIM
1926–27	Port Arthur Ports	TBSHL	16	1	1	2	2	—	—	—	—	—
1927–28	Fort William Forts	TBSHL	19	10	1	11	10	—	—	—	—	—
1928–29	Fort William Forts	TBSHL	—	—	—	—	—	—	—	—	—	—
1929–30	Duluth Hornets	AHA	48	8	7	15	33	—	—	—	—	—
1930–31	Duluth Hornets	AHA	47	18	10	28	30	—	—	—	—	—
1931–32	Duluth Hornets	AHA	48	14	13	27	24	—	—	—	—	—
1932–33	Ottawa Senators	NHL	48	4	9	13	2	—	—	—	—	—
1933–34	Windsor Bulldogs	IHL	43	8	12	20	12	—	—	—	—	—
1934–35	Philadelphia Arrows	Can-Am	48	20	32	52	15	—	—	—	—	—
1935–36	New Haven Eagles	Can-Am	48	16	17	33	26	—	—	—	—	—
1936–37	Fort William Wanderers	TBSHL	—	—	—	—	—	—	—	—	—	—
1937–38	Fort William Wanderers	TBSHL	—	—	—	—	—	—	—	—	—	—
1938–39	Duluth Zephyrs	TBSHL	11	8	13	21	—	—	—	—	—	—
1938–39	Duluth Zephyrs	USHL	26	18	13	31	7	—	—	—	—	—
1939–40	Geraldton Gold Miners	TBSHL	24	18	21	39	8	—	—	—	—	—
1940–41	Geraldton Gold Miners	TBSHL	12	6	3	9	2	—	—	—	—	—
AHA totals			143	40	30	70	87	—	—	—	—	—
NHL totals			48	4	9	13	2	—	—	—	—	—
