= Leo Murray =

Canadian ice hockey player (1899–1965)

- Born: August 24, 1899; Montreal, Quebec, Canada
- Died: November 20, 1965 (aged 66); Montreal, Quebec, Canada
- Height: 5 ft 9 in (175 cm)
- Weight: 165 lb (75 kg; 11 st 11 lb)
- Position: Forward
- Shot: Left
- Played for: Montreal Canadiens
- Playing career: 1926–1936

Leo Patrick Murray (August 24, 1899 – November 20, 1965) was a Canadian professional ice hockey forward. He played 6 games in the National Hockey League for the Montreal Canadiens during the 1932–33 season. The rest of his career, which lasted from 1922 to 1936, was spent in the minor leagues. He was born in Montreal, Quebec. He is buried in Cote de Neiges Cemetery in Montreal, Quebec.

== Career statistics ==
=== Regular season and playoffs ===
			Regular season					Playoffs
Season	Team	League	GP	G	A	Pts	PIM	GP	G	A	Pts	PIM
1922–23	Montreal St. Ann's	MCHL	2	0	0	0	—	—	—	—	—	—
1923–24	Montreal Eurekas	MCHL	—	—	—	—	—	—	—	—	—	—
1924–25	Montreal St. Ann's	ECHL	12	8	0	8	—	—	—	—	—	—
1924–25	Montreal Eurekas	MCHL	—	—	—	—	—	—	—	—	—	—
1925–26	Montreal Columbus-Club	QAHA	8	5	0	5	15	—	—	—	—	—
1925–26	Montreal CNR	MRTAHL	9	7	0	7	6	1	0	0	0	2
1926–27	Quebec Castors	Can-Am	32	13	4	17	36	2	0	0	0	2
1927–28	Quebec Castors	Can-Am	39	10	5	15	69	6	1	0	1	12
1928–29	Newark Bulldogs	Can-Am	40	6	3	9	78	—	—	—	—	—
1929–30	Providence Reds	Can-Am	22	3	3	6	47	—	—	—	—	—
1930–31	Detroit Olympics	IHL	27	3	5	8	18	—	—	—	—	—
1930–31	Philadelphia Arrows	Can-Am	15	5	1	6	27	—	—	—	—	—
1931–32	Providence Reds	Can-Am	39	17	11	28	65	5	2	2	4	2
1932–33	Montreal Canadiens	NHL	6	0	0	0	2	—	—	—	—	—
1932–33	Providence Reds	Can-Am	42	16	14	30	51	2	1	1	2	0
1933–34	Providence Reds	Can-Am	40	9	12	21	60	3	0	0	0	9
1934–35	Providence Reds	Can-Am	39	2	10	12	32	6	1	0	1	6
1935–36	Springfield Indians	Can-Am	16	2	6	8	12	3	0	1	1	0
Can-Am totals			324	83	69	152	477	27	5	4	9	31
NHL totals			6	0	0	0	0	—	—	—	—	—
