= Obs Heximer =

Canadian ice hockey player

- Born: February 16, 1910 Niagara Falls, Ontario, Canada
- Died: July 16, 1988 (aged 78)
- Height: 5 ft 7 in (170 cm)
- Weight: 159 lb (72 kg; 11 st 5 lb)
- Position: Left Wing
- Shot: Left
- Played for: New York Americans; Boston Bruins; New York Rangers
- Playing career: 1929–1942

Orville Russell "Obs" Heximer (February 16, 1910 – July 16, 1988) was a Canadian professional ice hockey player who played 85 games in the National Hockey League between 1929 and 1935. Born in Niagara Falls, Ontario, he played with the New York Americans, New York Rangers, and Boston Bruins. The rest of his career, which lasted from 1929 to 1942, was spent in various minor leagues.

== Career statistics ==
=== Regular season and playoffs ===
			Regular season					Playoffs
Season	Team	League	GP	G	A	Pts	PIM	GP	G	A	Pts	PIM
1926–27	Niagara Falls Cataracts	OHA	—	—	—	—	—	4	2	3	5	—
1927–28	Niagara Falls Cataracts	OHA	—	—	—	—	—	—	—	—	—	—
1928–29	Niagara Falls Cataracts	OHA	—	—	—	—	—	—	—	—	—	—
1929–30	New York Rangers	NHL	19	1	0	1	4	—	—	—	—	—
1929–30	Springfield Indians	Can-Am	14	13	6	19	18	—	—	—	—	—
1930–31	Springfield Indians	Can-Am	40	36	25	61	70	7	4	0	4	21
1931–32	Springfield Indians	Can-Am	40	11	17	28	51	—	—	—	—	—
1932–33	Boston Bruins	NHL	48	7	5	12	12	5	0	0	0	2
1933–34	Boston Cubs	Can-Am	39	12	15	27	53	5	1	2	3	2
1934–35	Boston Cubs	Can-Am	13	1	10	11	5	—	—	—	—	—
1934–35	New York Americans	NHL	17	5	2	7	0	—	—	—	—	—
1934–35	New Haven Eagles	Can-Am	12	11	5	16	7	—	—	—	—	—
1935–36	New Haven Eagles	Can-Am	39	15	10	25	35	—	—	—	—	—
1936–37	New Haven Eagles	IAHL	42	9	12	21	39	—	—	—	—	—
1937–38	New Haven Eagles	IAHL	36	13	11	24	21	—	—	—	—	—
1937–38	Springfield Indians	IAHL	6	2	1	3	0	—	—	—	—	—
1938–39	St. Paul Saints	AHA	41	22	25	47	43	3	0	2	2	0
1940–41	Niagara Falls Brights	OHA Sr	26	4	5	9	8	3	1	0	1	5
1941–42	Niagara Falls Weavers	OHA Sr	18	0	1	1	2	7	0	3	3	15
Can-Am totals			197	99	88	187	239	12	5	2	7	23
NHL totals			84	13	7	20	16	5	0	0	0	2
