= Bert McInenly =

Canadian ice hockey player

- Born: May 6, 1906; Quebec City, Quebec, Canada
- Died: October 15, 1993 (aged 87); Ottawa, Ontario, Canada
- Height: 5 ft 9 in (175 cm)
- Weight: 160 lb (73 kg; 11 st 6 lb)
- Position: Left wing
- Shot: Left
- Played for: Boston Bruins; Ottawa Senators; New York Americans; Detroit Falcons
- Playing career: 1925–1941

Bertram Harold McInenly (May 6, 1906 – October 15, 1993) was a Canadian ice hockey player who played 166 games in the National Hockey League. Born in Quebec City, Quebec, he played for the Detroit Falcons, New York Americans, Ottawa Senators, and Boston Bruins between 1930 and 1936. The rest of his career, which lasted from 1925 to 1941, was spent in various minor leagues.

== Career statistics ==
=== Regular season and playoffs ===
			Regular season					Playoffs
Season	Team	League	GP	G	A	Pts	PIM	GP	G	A	Pts	PIM
1924–25	Ottawa Rideaus	OCJHL	5	1	0	1	—	—	—	—	—	—
1925–26	Ottawa Shamrocks	OCHL	15	8	2	10	—	—	—	—	—	—
1926–27	Berlin High	NEHL	30	24	9	33	19	—	—	—	—	—
1926–27	Ottawa Shamrocks	OCHL	2	2	1	3	—	—	—	—	—	—
1927–28	Ottawa Gunners	OCHL	14	3	3	6	—	—	—	—	—	—
1928–29	Detroit Olympics	Can-Pro	41	5	0	5	—	7	3	0	3	26
1929–30	Detroit Olympics	IHL	42	9	3	12	113	3	1	0	1	4
1930–31	Detroit Falcons	NHL	44	3	5	8	48	—	—	—	—	—
1931–32	Detroit Falcons	NHL	17	0	1	1	14	—	—	—	—	—
1931–32	New York Americans	NHL	30	12	6	18	44	—	—	—	—	—
1932–33	Ottawa Senators	NHL	30	2	2	4	8	—	—	—	—	—
1933–34	Ottawa Senators	NHL	2	0	0	0	0	—	—	—	—	—
1933–34	Boston Bruins	NHL	6	0	0	0	2	—	—	—	—	—
1933–34	Boston Tigers	Can-Am	26	4	9	13	36	5	0	1	1	25
1934–35	Boston Bruins	NHL	33	2	1	3	24	4	0	0	0	2
1934–35	Boston Tigers	Can-Am	15	2	3	5	29	—	—	—	—	—
1935–36	Boston Bruins	NHL	3	0	0	0	0	—	—	—	—	—
1935–36	Boston Cubs	Can-Am	40	4	10	14	24	—	—	—	—	—
1936–37	Providence Reds	IAHL	49	5	4	9	61	3	1	1	2	2
1937–38	Springfield Indians	IAHL	37	0	7	7	39	—	—	—	—	—
1933–39	Springfield Indians	IAHL	51	4	7	11	69	3	0	0	0	0
1939–40	Syracuse Stars	IAHL	56	2	13	15	26	—	—	—	—	—
1940–41	Buffalo Bisons	AHL	49	0	10	10	34	—	—	—	—	—
IAHL/AHL totals			242	11	41	52	229	6	1	1	2	2
NHL totals			165	19	15	34	140	4	0	0	0	2
