= Tommy Filmore =

Canadian ice hockey player

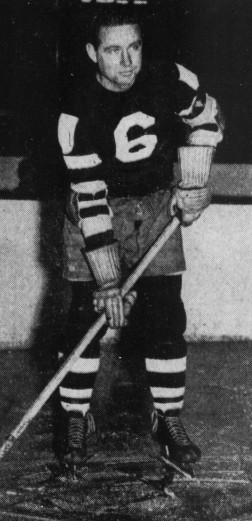
- Filmore, circa 1939
- Born: March 14, 1906 Thamesford, Ontario, Canada
- Died: January 11, 1954 (aged 47) Clearwater, Florida, U.S.
- Height: 5 ft 11 in (180 cm)
- Weight: 190 lb (86 kg; 13 st 8 lb)
- Position: Right wing
- Shot: Right
- Played for: Boston Bruins; New York Americans; Detroit Falcons
- Playing career: 1927–1941

Thomas Henry Filmore (March 14, 1906 – January 11, 1954) was a Canadian professional ice hockey player who played 116 games in the National Hockey League. Born in Thamesford, Ontario. He played for the Boston Bruins, Detroit Falcons, and New York Americans between 1930 and 1934. The rest of his career, which lasted from 1927 to 1942, was spent in various minor leagues. In 1947, he was named hockey coach at the University of Massachusetts. He amassed a 0–5 record over two seasons. He spent eleven years as a golf pro at the Springfield Country Club in Springfield, Massachusetts. On January 11, 1954, he suffered a heart attack after a round of golf at the PGA National Golf Club in Dunedin, Florida and died while being transported to the Morton Plant Hospital.

== Career statistics ==
=== Regular season and playoffs ===
| | | | Regular season | | | | | Playoffs |
| Season | Team | League | GP | G | A | Pts | PIM | GP | G | A | Pts | PIM |
|---|---|---|---|---|---|---|---|---|---|---|---|---|
| 1926–27 | London 12th Battery | OHA Sr | — | — | — | — | — | 13 | 19 | 7 | 26 | — |
| 1927–28 | London Panthers | Can-Pro | 40 | 19 | 7 | 26 | 18 | — | — | — | — | — |
| 1928–29 | London Panthers | Can-Pro | 15 | 1 | 2 | 3 | 11 | — | — | — | — | — |
| 1928–29 | Detroit Olympics | Can-Pro | 25 | 10 | 6 | 16 | 12 | 7 | 2 | 1 | 3 | 9 |
| 1929–30 | Detroit Olympics | IHL | 42 | 18 | 16 | 34 | 34 | 3 | 1 | 0 | 1 | 0 |
| 1930–31 | Detroit Falcons | NHL | 39 | 6 | 2 | 8 | 10 | — | — | — | — | — |
| 1931–32 | Detroit Falcons | NHL | 9 | 0 | 0 | 0 | 2 | — | — | — | — | — |
| 1931–32 | Detroit Olympics | IHL | 11 | 2 | 1 | 3 | 4 | — | — | — | — | — |
| 1931–32 | New York Americans | NHL | 31 | 8 | 6 | 14 | 12 | — | — | — | — | — |
| 1932–33 | New York Americans | NHL | 34 | 1 | 4 | 5 | 9 | — | — | — | — | — |
| 1932–33 | Boston Bruins | NHL | 1 | 0 | 0 | 0 | 0 | — | — | — | — | — |
| 1932–33 | Boston Cubs | Can-Am | 10 | 3 | 4 | 7 | 0 | 7 | 0 | 4 | 4 | 4 |
| 1933–34 | Boston Bruins | NHL | 3 | 0 | 0 | 0 | 0 | — | — | — | — | — |
| 1933–34 | Boston Cubs | Can-Am | 35 | 16 | 11 | 27 | 10 | 5 | 2 | 1 | 3 | 6 |
| 1934–35 | Quebec Castors | Can-Am | 15 | 3 | 4 | 7 | 6 | 3 | 1 | 0 | 1 | 10 |
| 1935–36 | Providence Reds | Can-Am | 42 | 10 | 7 | 17 | 6 | 7 | 1 | 5 | 6 | 6 |
| 1936–37 | Springfield Indians | IAHL | 41 | 9 | 19 | 28 | 14 | 5 | 0 | 0 | 0 | 0 |
| 1937–38 | Springfield Indians | IAHL | 37 | 16 | 14 | 30 | 19 | — | — | — | — | — |
| 1938–39 | Springfield Indians | IAHL | 28 | 16 | 13 | 29 | 4 | 3 | 0 | 0 | 0 | 0 |
| 1939–40 | Springfield Indians | IAHL | 39 | 16 | 20 | 36 | 6 | 3 | 3 | 1 | 4 | 7 |
| 1941–42 | Fort Worth Rangers | AHA | 1 | 0 | 0 | 0 | 0 | — | — | — | — | — |
| IAHL totals | | | 145 | 57 | 66 | 123 | 43 | 11 | 3 | 1 | 4 | 7 |
| NHL totals | | | 117 | 15 | 12 | 27 | 33 | — | — | — | — | — |
