= Marty Burke =

Canadian ice hockey player (1905–1968)

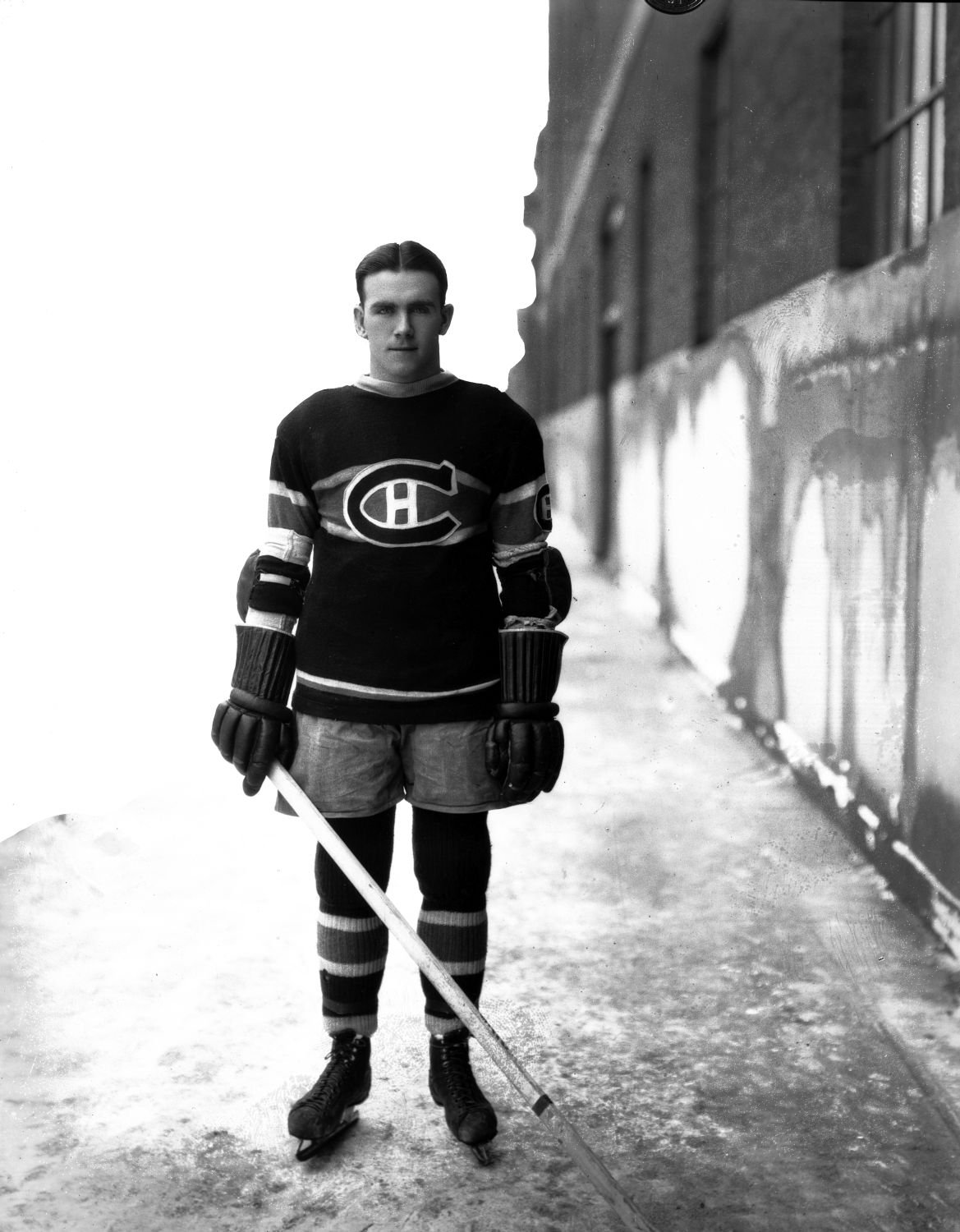
- Born: January 28, 1905; Toronto, Ontario, Canada
- Died: March 7, 1968 (aged 63)
- Height: 5 ft 8 in (173 cm)
- Weight: 160 lb (73 kg; 11 st 6 lb)
- Position: Defence
- Shot: Left
- Played for: Montreal Canadiens; Chicago Black Hawks; Pittsburgh Pirates; Ottawa Senators
- Playing career: 1927–1938

Martin Alfonses Burke (January 28, 1905 in Toronto, Ontario – March 7, 1968) was a defenceman in the National Hockey League for the Montreal Canadiens, Pittsburgh Pirates and Chicago Black Hawks. He was on two Stanley Cup championship teams in 1930 and 1931 with Montreal.

Burke may have been the first player to wear a helmet during an NHL game, donning one to protect an injured ear during a game in December 1928.

== Career statistics ==
=== Regular season and playoffs ===
			Regular season					Playoffs
Season	Team	League	GP	G	A	Pts	PIM	GP	G	A	Pts	PIM
1923–24	Toronto St. Mary's	OHA Jr	5	4	1	5	8	2	0	0	0	—
1924–25	Stratford Indians	OHA Sr	18	1	4	5	52	2	0	0	0	2
1925–26	Stratford Indians	OHA Sr	20	3	4	7	34	—	—	—	—	—
1926–27	Port Arthur Ports	TBSHL	20	3	1	4	65	2	1	0	1	4
1927–28	Montreal Canadiens	NHL	11	0	0	0	10	—	—	—	—	—
1927–28	Pittsburgh Pirates	NHL	35	2	1	3	51	2	1	0	1	2
1928–29	Montreal Canadiens	NHL	44	4	2	6	68	3	0	0	0	8
1929–30	Montreal Canadiens	NHL	44	2	11	13	71	6	0	1	1	6
1930–31	Montreal Canadiens	NHL	44	2	5	7	91	10	1	2	3	10
1931–32	Montreal Canadiens	NHL	48	3	6	9	50	4	0	0	0	12
1932–33	Montreal Canadiens	NHL	29	2	5	7	36	—	—	—	—	—
1932–33	Ottawa Senators	NHL	16	0	0	0	10	—	—	—	—	—
1933–34	Montreal Canadiens	NHL	45	1	4	5	28	2	0	1	1	2
1934–35	Chicago Black Hawks	NHL	47	2	2	4	29	2	0	0	0	2
1935–36	Chicago Black Hawks	NHL	40	0	3	3	49	2	0	0	0	2
1936–37	Chicago Black Hawks	NHL	41	1	3	4	28	—	—	—	—	—
1937–38	Chicago Black Hawks	NHL	12	0	0	0	8	—	—	—	—	—
1937–38	Montreal Canadiens	NHL	38	0	5	5	31	—	—	—	—	—
1938–39	Saskatoon Quakers	SSHL	—	—	—	—	—	—	—	—	—	—
NHL totals			494	19	47	66	560	31	2	4	6	44
