= Leo Bourgeault =

Canadian ice hockey player

- Born: January 17, 1903 Sturgeon Falls, Ontario, Canada
- Died: July 14, 1978 (aged 75) Montreal, Quebec, Canada
- Height: 5 ft 9 in (175 cm)
- Weight: 165 lb (75 kg; 11 st 11 lb)
- Position: Defence
- Shot: Left
- Played for: Saskatoon Crescents; Toronto St. Pats/Maple Leafs; New York Rangers; Ottawa Senators; Montreal Canadiens
- Playing career: 1924–1936

Joseph Armand Leo Bourgault (January 17, 1903 - July 14, 1978) was a Canadian professional ice hockey player. He played in the National Hockey League with four teams between 1926 and 1935. He was born in Sturgeon Falls, Ontario.

== Playing career ==
Bourgault started his National Hockey League career with the Toronto Maple Leafs in 1926. He also played for the New York Rangers, Ottawa Senators, and Montreal Canadiens. He left the NHL after the 1934 season. He played 2 more seasons in the CAHL before retiring from hockey after the 1936 season. He won the Stanley Cup in 1928 with the New York Rangers. He is one of six NHL players to have worn the number 99. His name is sometimes written "Bourgeault" by mistake.

== Career statistics ==
=== Regular season and playoffs ===
			Regular season					Playoffs
Season	Team	League	GP	G	A	Pts	PIM	GP	G	A	Pts	PIM
1921–22	North Bay Trappers	NOHA	4	4	1	5	—	8	6	3	9	—
1922–23	North Bay Trappers	NOHA	—	—	—	—	—	—	—	—	—	—
1923–24	Guelph Royals	OHA Sr	—	—	—	—	—	—	—	—	—	—
1924–25	Saskatoon Crescents	WCHL	19	3	0	3	8	—	—	—	—	—
1925–26	Saskatoon Crescents	WHL	30	5	2	7	18	2	0	0	0	6
1926–27	Toronto St. Pats/Maple Leafs	NHL	22	1	0	1	42	—	—	—	—	—
1926–27	New York Rangers	NHL	20	1	1	2	30	2	0	0	0	0
1927–28	New York Rangers	NHL	37	7	0	7	72	9	0	0	0	10
1928–29	New York Rangers	NHL	44	2	3	5	59	6	0	0	0	0
1929–30	New York Rangers	NHL	44	7	6	13	56	3	1	1	2	6
1930–31	New York Rangers	NHL	10	0	1	1	12	—	—	—	—	—
1930–31	Ottawa Senators	NHL	28	0	4	4	28	—	—	—	—	—
1931–32	Bronx Tigers	Can-Am	40	10	9	19	89	2	0	0	0	4
1932–33	Ottawa Senators	NHL	35	1	1	2	18	—	—	—	—	—
1932–33	Montreal Canadiens	NHL	15	1	1	2	9	2	0	0	0	0
1933–34	Montreal Canadiens	NHL	48	5	3	8	10	2	0	0	0	0
1934–35	Montreal Canadiens	NHL	4	0	0	0	0	—	—	—	—	—
1934–35	Quebec Castors	Can-Am	43	13	14	27	34	3	1	0	1	2
1935–36	Springfield Indians	Can-Am	2	1	0	1	0	2	0	2	2	0
NHL totals			307	25	20	45	336	24	1	1	2	18
