= Harvey Rockburn =

Canadian ice hockey player

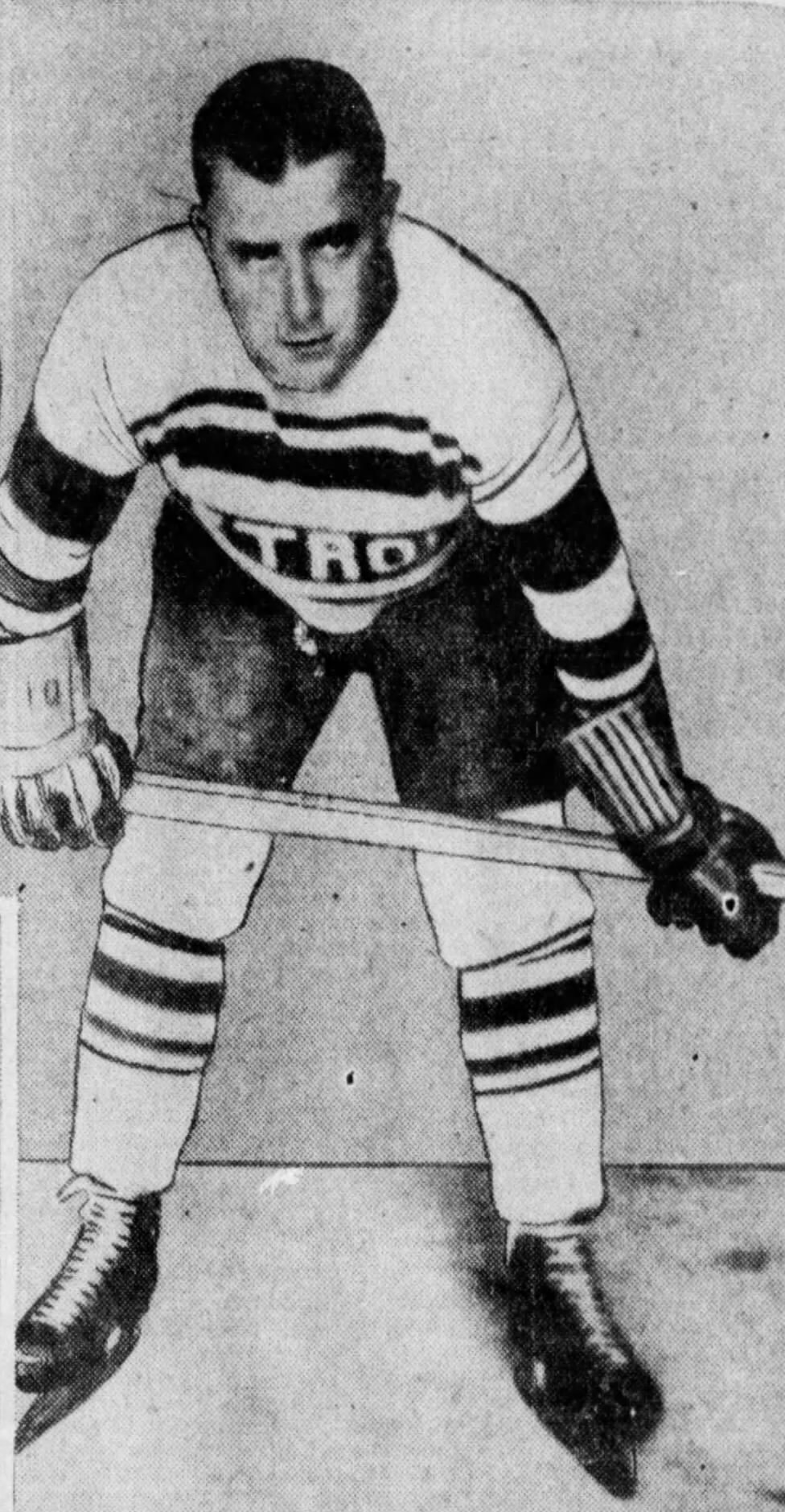
- Rockburn in 1929
- Born: August 20, 1904 Ottawa, Ontario, Canada
- Died: June 9, 1977 (aged 72) Concord, New Hampshire, USA
- Height: 5 ft 10 in (178 cm)
- Weight: 195 lb (88 kg; 13 st 13 lb)
- Position: Defence
- Shot: Left
- Played for: Detroit Cougars; Detroit Falcons; Ottawa Senators
- Playing career: 1925–1940

Harvey "Rocky" Rockburn (August 20, 1904 – June 9, 1977) was a Canadian professional ice hockey defenceman who played 94 games in the National Hockey League with the Detroit Cougars, Detroit Falcons and Ottawa Senators between 1929 and 1933. The rest of his career, which lasted from 1925 to 1940, was spent in various minor leagues. He died in Concord, New Hampshire in 1977.

== Career statistics ==
=== Regular season and playoffs ===
			Regular season					Playoffs
Season	Team	League	GP	G	A	Pts	PIM	GP	G	A	Pts	PIM
1924–25	Ottawa Tigers	OCJHL	—	—	—	—	—	—	—	—	—	—
1925–26	Ottawa Gunners	OCHL	15	3	1	4	—	6	0	0	0	0
1925–26	Montreal CNR	MRTHL	1	0	0	0	0	—	—	—	—	—
1926–27	Ottawa Shamrocks	OCHL	2	1	1	2	—	—	—	—	—	—
1926–27	Berlin High	NEHL	27	6	4	10	24	—	—	—	—	—
1927–28	Detroit Olympics	Can-Pro	36	2	1	3	82	2	0	0	0	8
1928–29	Detroit Olympics	Can-Pro	37	2	1	3	176	7	1	0	1	42
1929–30	Detroit Cougars	NHL	36	4	1	5	101	—	—	—	—	—
1930–31	Detroit Falcons	NHL	42	0	1	1	124	—	—	—	—	—
1931–32	Detroit Olympics	IHL	46	6	3	9	149	6	1	0	1	20
1932–33	Providence Reds	Can-Am	4	0	0	0	20	—	—	—	—	—
1932–33	Windsor Bulldogs	IHL	18	1	0	1	36	—	—	—	—	—
1932–33	Ottawa Senators	NHL	16	0	1	1	39	—	—	—	—	—
1933–34	London Tecumsehs	IHL	41	6	11	17	113	4	0	0	0	12
1934–35	Windsor Bulldogs	IHL	40	2	4	6	114	—	—	—	—	—
1935–36	Cleveland Falcons	IHL	32	0	1	1	83	—	—	—	—	—
1935–36	Rochester Cardinals	IHL	1	0	0	0	0	—	—	—	—	—
1936–37	Kansas City Greyhounds	AHA	48	5	3	8	73	2	0	0	0	4
1937–38	St. Paul Saints	AHA	32	2	5	7	46	—	—	—	—	—
1937–38	Portland Buckaroos	PCHL	6	0	0	0	16	—	—	—	—	—
1939–40	Ottawa Lasalle	OCHL	15	0	5	5	36	4	2	1	3	9
IHL totals			178	17	17	34	395	10	1	0	1	32
NHL totals			94	4	3	7	264	—	—	—	—	—
