= Alex Smith (ice hockey) =

Canadian ice hockey player

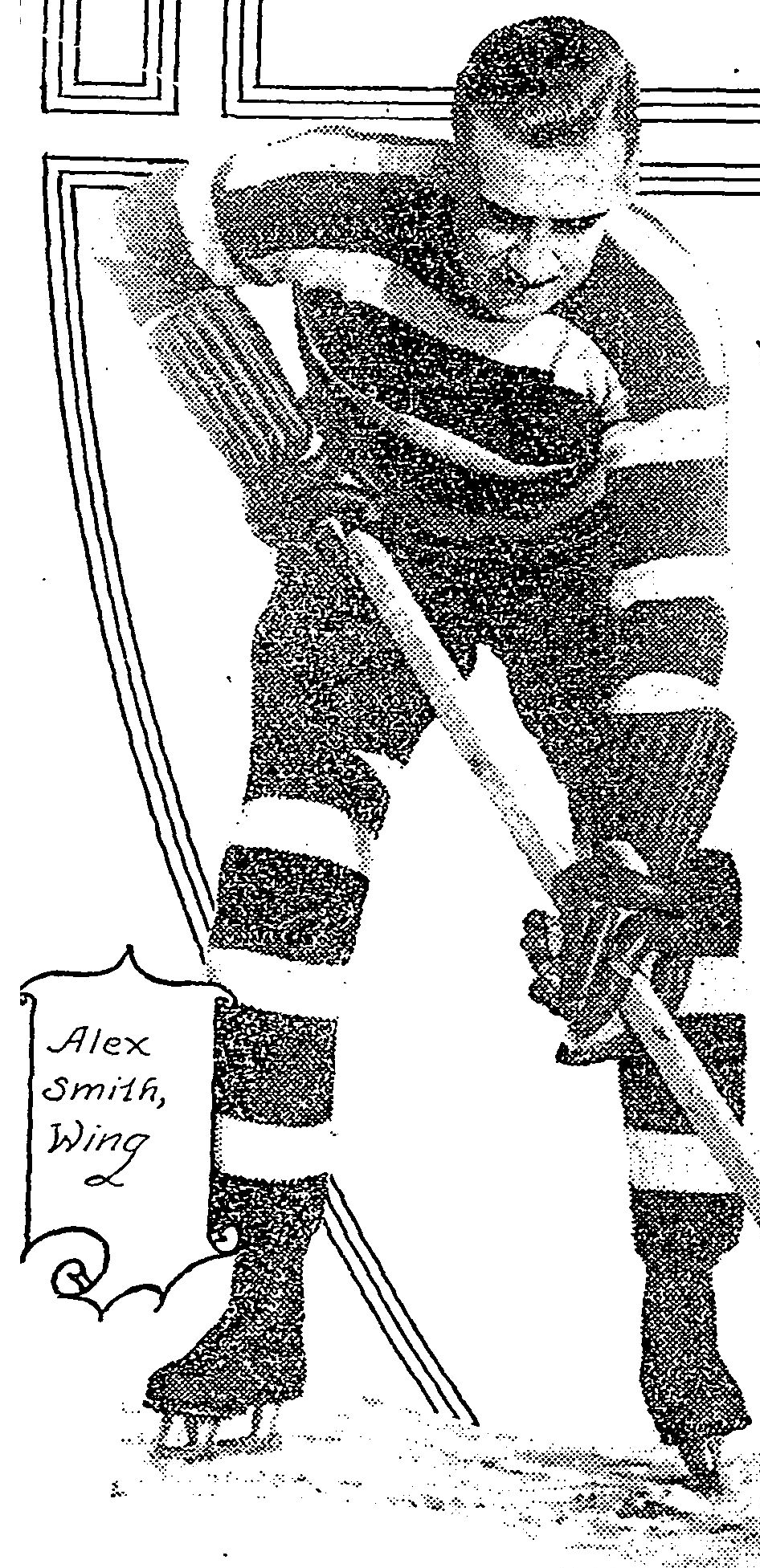
- Smith in 1925/26
- Born: 2 April 1902 Bootle, Liverpool, Lancashire, England
- Died: 29 November 1963 (aged 61) Ottawa, Ontario, Canada
- Height: 5 ft 11 in (180 cm)
- Weight: 176 lb (80 kg; 12 st 8 lb)
- Position: Defence
- Shot: Left
- Played for: Ottawa Senators; Detroit Falcons; Boston Bruins; New York Americans
- Playing career: 1924–1937

Alexander "Boots" Smith (2 April 1902 – 29 November 1963) was a Canadian ice hockey defenceman who played 11 seasons in the National Hockey League for the Ottawa Senators, Detroit Falcons, Boston Bruins and New York Americans between 1924 and 1935. He won the Stanley Cup in 1927 with Ottawa. He was born in Bootle, Liverpool, Lancashire, England, but grew up in Ottawa, Ontario.

He was inducted into the Lisgar Collegiate Institute Athletic Wall of Fame in 2009.

== Career statistics ==
=== Regular season and playoffs ===
			Regular season					Playoffs
Season	Team	League	GP	G	A	Pts	PIM	GP	G	A	Pts	PIM
1922–23	Ottawa Gunners	OCHL	3	1	0	1	0	—	—	—	—	—
1923–24	Ottawa Collegiate Institute	HS-ON	—	—	—	—	—	—	—	—	—	—
1924–25	Ottawa Rideaus	OCHL	11	7	1	8	—	3	0	0	0	0
1924–25	Ottawa Senators	NHL	7	0	0	0	4	—	—	—	—	—
1925–26	Ottawa Senators	NHL	36	0	0	0	36	2	0	0	0	0
1926–27	Ottawa Senators	NHL	42	4	1	5	58	6	0	0	0	8
1927–28	Ottawa Senators	NHL	44	9	4	13	90	2	0	0	0	4
1928–29	Ottawa Senators	NHL	44	1	7	8	96	—	—	—	—	—
1929–30	Ottawa Senators	NHL	43	2	6	8	91	2	0	0	0	4
1930–31	Ottawa Senators	NHL	37	5	6	11	73	—	—	—	—	—
1931–32	Detroit Falcons	NHL	48	6	8	14	47	2	0	0	0	4
1932–33	Ottawa Senators	NHL	34	2	0	2	42	—	—	—	—	—
1932–33	Boston Bruins	NHL	15	5	4	9	30	5	0	2	2	6
1933–34	Boston Bruins	NHL	45	4	6	10	32	—	—	—	—	—
1934–35	New York Americans	NHL	48	3	8	11	46	—	—	—	—	—
1935–36	Ottawa RCAF Flyers	OCHL	—	—	—	—	—	—	—	—	—	—
NHL totals			443	41	50	91	645	19	0	2	2	26

== See also ==
- List of National Hockey League players from the United Kingdom
