= John Gallagher (ice hockey) =

Canadian ice hockey player

- Born: January 19, 1909 Kenora, Ontario, Canada
- Died: September 16, 1981 (aged 72)
- Height: 5 ft 11 in (180 cm)
- Weight: 188 lb (85 kg; 13 st 6 lb)
- Position: Defence
- Shot: Left
- Played for: New York Americans; Detroit Red Wings; Montreal Maroons
- Playing career: 1929–1939

John James Gallagher (January 19, 1909 — September 16, 1981) was a Canadian professional ice hockey player who played 204 games in the National Hockey League with the Montreal Maroons, Detroit Red Wings, and New York Americans between 1930 and 1939. He won the Stanley Cup with Detroit in 1937.

== Career statistics ==
=== Regular season and playoffs ===
			Regular season					Playoffs
Season	Team	League	GP	G	A	Pts	PIM	GP	G	A	Pts	PIM
1925–26	Kenora Thistles	TBSHL	16	4	3	7	12	—	—	—	—	—
1926–27	Kenora Thistles	TBJHL	—	—	—	—	—	—	—	—	—	—
1928–29	Kenora Thistles	TBJHL	16	4	3	7	12	—	—	—	—	—
1929–30	Montreal AAA	MCHL	10	3	0	3	25	2	0	0	0	0
1929–30	Montreal CNR	MCHL	—	—	—	—	—	—	—	—	—	—
1929–30	Montreal AAA	Al-Cup	—	—	—	—	—	9	3	3	6	26
1930–31	Montreal Maroons	NHL	35	4	2	6	35	2	0	0	0	0
1931–32	Montreal Maroons	NHL	19	1	0	1	18	—	—	—	—	—
1931–32	Windsor Bulldogs	IHL	29	6	4	10	48	6	2	1	3	13
1932–33	Montreal Maroons	NHL	7	1	0	1	0	—	—	—	—	—
1932–33	Detroit Red Wings	NHL	34	3	5	8	48	4	1	1	2	4
1932–33	Detroit Olympics	IHL	3	0	0	0	0	—	—	—	—	—
1934–35	Windsor Bulldogs	IHL	26	3	5	8	8	—	—	—	—	—
1935–36	Detroit Olympics	IHL	44	4	3	7	40	6	3	0	3	2
1936–37	New York Americans	NHL	9	0	0	0	8	—	—	—	—	—
1936–37	Pittsburgh Hornets	IAHL	31	6	7	13	22	5	0	0	0	0
1936–37	Detroit Red Wings	NHL	10	1	0	1	0	10	1	0	1	17
1937–38	New York Americans	NHL	46	3	6	9	18	6	0	2	2	6
1938–39	New York Americans	NHL	43	1	5	6	22	2	0	0	0	0
NHL totals			203	14	18	32	151	24	2	3	5	27
