= Harold Starr =

Canadian ice hockey player

- Born: July 6, 1906 Ottawa, Ontario, Canada
- Died: September 25, 1981 (aged 78) Ottawa, Ontario, Canada
- Height: 5 ft 11 in (180 cm)
- Weight: 176 lb (80 kg; 12 st 8 lb)
- Position: Defence
- Shot: Left
- Played for: Ottawa Senators; Montreal Maroons; Montreal Canadiens; Detroit Red Wings; New York Rangers
- Playing career: 1921–1939

Harold William Joseph "Twinkle" Starr (July 6, 1906 – September 25, 1981) was a Canadian professional ice hockey player who played 206 games in the National Hockey League with the Ottawa Senators, Montreal Maroons, Montreal Canadiens, Detroit Red Wings, and New York Rangers between 1929 and 1936.

== Career statistics ==
=== Regular season and playoffs ===
			Regular season					Playoffs
Season	Team	League	GP	G	A	Pts	PIM	GP	G	A	Pts	PIM
1921–22	Ottawa Gunners	OCHL	1	0	0	0	0	—	—	—	—	—
1922–23	Ottawa St. Brigid	OCHL	2	0	0	0	0	—	—	—	—	—
1923–24	Ottawa Gunners	OCHL	—	—	—	—	—	—	—	—	—	—
1924–25	Ottawa Gunners	OCHL	—	—	—	—	—	—	—	—	—	—
1925–26	Ottawa Shamrocks	OCHL	2	1	0	1	0	—	—	—	—	—
1926–27	Ottawa Shamrocks	OCHL	15	3	2	5	—	—	—	—	—	—
1927–28	Ottawa Shamrocks	OCHL	—	—	—	—	—	—	—	—	—	—
1928–29	Ottawa Shamrocks	OCHL	11	1	1	2	—	5	4	0	4	10
1929–30	Ottawa Senators	NHL	28	2	1	3	12	—	—	—	—	—
1929–30	London Panthers	IHL	13	2	2	4	22	—	—	—	—	—
1930–31	Ottawa Senators	NHL	35	2	1	3	48	—	—	—	—	—
1931–32	Montreal Maroons	NHL	47	1	2	3	51	4	0	0	0	0
1932–33	Ottawa Senators	NHL	31	0	0	0	30	—	—	—	—	—
1932–33	Montreal Canadiens	NHL	15	0	0	0	6	2	0	0	0	2
1933–34	Montreal Maroons	NHL	1	0	0	0	0	3	0	0	0	0
1933–34	Windsor Bulldogs	IHL	41	5	2	7	40	—	—	—	—	—
1934–35	New York Rangers	NHL	33	0	0	0	30	4	0	0	0	2
1934–35	Windsor Bulldogs	IHL	15	0	0	0	12	—	—	—	—	—
1935–36	Cleveland Falcons	IHL	16	1	1	2	19	2	0	0	0	0
1935–36	New York Rangers	NHL	16	0	0	0	12	—	—	—	—	—
1937–38	Ottawa Senators	QSHL	22	1	2	3	12	5	0	0	0	0
1938–39	Ottawa Lasalle	QSHL	16	3	0	3	12	5	1	2	3	10
NHL totals			206	5	4	9	189	15	1	0	1	4
