= 1932–33 New York Rangers season =

NHL hockey team season (won Stanley Cup)

1932–33 New York Rangers
- Stanley Cup champions
- Division: 3rd American
- 1932–33 record: 23–17–8
- Home record: 12–7–5
- Road record: 11–10–3
- Goals for: 135
- Goals against: 107

Team information
- General manager: Lester Patrick
- Coach: Lester Patrick
- Captain: Bill Cook
- Arena: Madison Square Garden

Team leaders
- Goals: Bill Cook (28)
- Assists: Frank Boucher (28)
- Points: Bill Cook (50)
- Penalty minutes: Ching Johnson (127)
- Wins: Andy Aitkenhead (23)
- Goals against average: Andy Aitkenhead (2.48)

The 1932–33 New York Rangers season was the franchise's seventh season. In the regular season, the Rangers finished third in the American Division with a 23–17–8 record. New York qualified for the Stanley Cup playoffs, where the Rangers defeated the Montreal Canadiens 8–5 in the quarter-finals and the Detroit Red Wings 6–3 in the semi-finals to reach the Stanley Cup Finals for the fourth time in franchise history. In the Cup Finals, New York defeated the Toronto Maple Leafs, three games to one to win the second Stanley Cup in New York Rangers history.

== Regular season ==
=== Final standings ===
American Division
	GP	W	L	T	GF	GA	PTS
**Boston Bruins**	48	25	15	8	124	88	58
**Detroit Red Wings**	48	25	15	8	111	93	58
**New York Rangers**	48	23	17	8	135	107	54
Chicago Black Hawks	48	16	20	12	88	101	44

Note: GP = Games Played, W = Wins, L = Losses, T = Ties, Pts = Points, GF = Goals For, GA = Goals Against
Teams that qualified for the playoffs are highlighted in bold.

=== Record vs. opponents ===
==== Vs. American Division ====
1932–33 NHL records
Team	**BOS**	**CHI**	**DET**	**NYR**	**Total**
Boston	—	3–2–1	2–3–1	3–3	**8–8–2**
Chicago	2–3–1	—	1–5	2–2–2	**5–10–3**
Detroit	3–2–1	5–1	—	4–2	**12–5–1**
N.Y. Rangers	3–3	2–2–2	2–4	—	**7–9–2**

==== Vs. Canadian Division ====
1932–33 NHL records
Team	**MTL**	**MTM**	**NYA**	**OTT**	**TOR**	**Total**
Boston	4–1–1	4–2	2–2–2	3–1–2	4–1–1	**17–7–6**
Chicago	3–3	2–2–2	2–2–2	2–1–3	2–2–2	**11–10–9**
Detroit	3–2–1	1–4–1	3–0–3	4–1–1	2–3–1	**13–10–7**
N.Y. Rangers	4–1–1	2–3–1	3–2–1	3–0–3	2–4	**14–10–6**

== Schedule and results ==
1932–33 regular season
November: 3–1–1 (home: 1–0–1; road: 2–1–0)

Game	November	Opponent	Score	Record
1	10	@ Montreal Maroons	4–2	1–0–0
2	12	@ Toronto Maple Leafs	4–2	1–1–0
3	20	Toronto Maple Leafs	7–0	2–1–0
4	24	Chicago Black Hawks	1 – 1 OT	2–1–1
5	29	@ Boston Bruins	6–4	3–1–1

December: 7–3–2 (home: 5–1–0; road: 2–2–2)

Game	December	Opponent	Score	Record
6	1	@ Detroit Red Wings	4–2	4–1–1
7	4	@ Chicago Black Hawks	4–3	4–2–1
8	6	Montreal Canadiens	5–3	5–2–1
9	8	New York Americans	3–1	6–2–1
10	11	Boston Bruins	3 – 1 OT	7–2–1
11	13	@ Montreal Canadiens	1 – 1 OT	7–2–2
12	15	@ New York Americans	3–2	8–2–2
13	17	@ Ottawa Senators	2 – 2 OT	8–2–3
14	20	Detroit Red Wings	4–1	8–3–3
15	25	Montreal Maroons	2–0	9–3–3
16	29	Ottawa Senators	4–2	10–3–3
17	31	@ Montreal Maroons	4–2	10–4–3

January: 6–5–1 (home: 3–3–1; road: 3–2–0)

Game	January	Opponent	Score	Record
18	3	Toronto Maple Leafs	4–2	11–4–3
19	8	New York Americans	2 – 2 OT	11–4–4
20	10	@ Toronto Maple Leafs	3–2	11–5–4
21	12	Boston Bruins	3–1	12–5–4
22	15	@ Chicago Black Hawks	5–0	13–5–4
23	17	@ Detroit Red Wings	2–0	13–6–4
24	19	Montreal Canadiens	2–1	14–6–4
25	22	Montreal Maroons	5–0	14–7–4
26	24	@ New York Americans	3–2	15–7–4
27	26	Chicago Black Hawks	3–1	15–8–4
28	28	@ Ottawa Senators	9–2	16–8–4
29	31	Detroit Red Wings	2–1	16–9–4

February: 4–4–3 (home: 1–1–2; road: 3–3–1)

Game	February	Opponent	Score	Record
30	2	@ Montreal Maroons	2 – 2 OT	16–9–5
31	5	New York Americans	4–1	17–9–5
32	7	@ Boston Bruins	2–1	17–10–5
33	9	Ottawa Senators	3 – 3 OT	17–10–6
34	11	@ Toronto Maple Leafs	2–1	17–11–6
35	14	@ Ottawa Senators	3–1	18–11–6
36	16	Toronto Maple Leafs	5–2	18–12–6
37	18	@ Montreal Canadiens	3–1	19–12–6
38	21	Chicago Black Hawks	2 – 2 OT	19–12–7
39	23	@ Detroit Red Wings	3–0	19–13–7
40	26	@ Chicago Black Hawks	4–1	20–13–7

March: 3–4–1 (home: 2–2–1; road: 1–2–0)

Game	March	Opponent	Score	Record
41	5	Boston Bruins	2–1	20–14–7
42	9	Detroit Red Wings	3–2	21–14–7
43	12	@ New York Americans	8–2	22–14–7
44	14	Ottawa Senators	3 – 3 OT	22–14–8
45	16	@ Montreal Canadiens	2–1	22–15–8
46	19	Montreal Maroons	6–3	22–16–8
47	21	@ Boston Bruins	3–2	22–17–8
48	23	Montreal Canadiens	4–2	23–17–8

Legend: Win (2 points) Loss (0 points) Tie (1 point)

== Playoffs ==
=== Stanley Cup Finals ===
The Rangers, led by brothers Bill and Bun Cook on the right and left wings, respectively, and Frank Boucher at center, would defeat the Toronto Maple Leafs in the 1932–33 best-of-five finals, three games to one, to win their second Stanley Cup, exacting revenge on the Leafs' "Kid line" of Busher Jackson, Joe Primeau, and Charlie Conacher.

After game one, the Rangers would vacate Madison Square Garden for the circus. Bill Cook would become the first player to score a Cup-winning goal in overtime. Rookie goalie Andy Aitkenhead would post the fourth shutout by a rookie in the finals.

1933 Stanley Cup playoffs
Quarterfinals vs. (C3) Montreal Canadiens – Rangers win 8 goals to 5 goals

Game	Date	Visitor	Score	Home	OT	Series
1	March 26	Montreal Canadiens	2–5	New York Rangers		New York Rangers lead series 5 goals to 2 goals
2	March 28	New York Rangers	3–3	Montreal Canadiens	OT	New York Rangers win series 8 goals to 5 goals

Semifinals vs. (A2) Detroit Red Wings – Rangers win 6 goals to 3 goals

Game	Date	Visitor	Score	Home	OT	Series
1	March 30	Detroit Red Wings	0–2	New York Rangers		New York Rangers lead series 2 goals to 0 goals
2	April 1	New York Rangers	4–3	Detroit Red Wings		New York Rangers win series 6 goals to 3 goals

Stanley Cup Finals vs. (C1) Toronto Maple Leafs – Rangers win 3–1

Game	Date	Visitor	Score	Home	OT	Series
1	April 4	Toronto Maple Leafs	1–5	New York Rangers		New York Rangers lead series 1–0
2	April 8	New York Rangers	3–1	Toronto Maple Leafs		New York Rangers lead series 2–0
3	April 11	Toronto Maple Leafs	3–2	New York Rangers		New York Rangers lead series 2–1
4	April 13	New York Rangers	1–0	Toronto Maple Leafs	OT	New York Rangers win series 3–1

Legend: Win Loss Tie

== Player statistics ==
Skaters

Regular season
Player	GP	G	A	Pts	PIM
Bill Cook	48	28	22	50	51
Frederick Cook	48	22	15	37	35
Frank Boucher	46	7	28	35	4
Cecil Dillon	48	21	10	31	12
Art Somers	48	7	15	22	28
Albert Siebert	42	9	10	19	38
Ivan Johnson	48	8	9	17	127
Murray Murdoch	48	5	11	16	23
Oscar Asmundson	48	5	10	15	20
Melville Keeling	47	8	6	14	22
Ehrhardt Heller	40	5	7	12	31
Doug Brennan	48	5	4	9	94
Earl Seibert	45	2	3	5	92
Carl Voss^{‡}	10	2	1	3	4
Gordon Pettinger	35	1	2	3	18

Playoffs
Player	GP	G	A	Pts	PIM
Cecil Dillon	8	8	2	10	6
Murray Murdoch	8	3	4	7	2
Art Somers	8	1	4	5	8
Bill Cook	8	3	2	5	4
Frank Boucher	8	2	2	4	6
Ehrhardt Heller	8	3	0	3	10
Melville Keeling	8	0	2	2	8
Oscar Asmundson	8	0	2	2	4
Frederick Cook	8	2	0	2	4
Earl Seibert	8	1	0	1	14
Ivan Johnson	8	1	0	1	14
Albert Siebert	8	1	0	1	12
Gordon Pettinger	8	0	0	0	0
Doug Brennan	8	0	0	0	11

Goaltenders

Regular season
Player	GP	TOI	W	L	T	GA	GAA	SO
Andy Aitkenhead	48	2970	23	17	8	107	2.16	3

Playoffs
Player	GP	TOI	W	L	T	GA	GAA	SO
Andy Aitkenhead	8	488	6	1	1	13	1.60	2

^{†}Denotes player spent time with another team before joining Rangers. Stats reflect time with Rangers only.
^{‡}Traded mid-season. Stats reflect time with Rangers only.

Note:

Pos = Position;GP = Games played; G = Goals; A = Assists; Pts = Points; PIM = Penalty minutes; +/- = Plus/minus; PPG = Power-play goals; SHG = Short-handed goals; GWG = Game-winning goals
Pos = Position;GP = Games played; Min, TOI = Minutes played; W = Wins; L = Losses; T,T/OT = Ties; OTL = Overtime losses; GA = Goals-against; GAA = Goals-against average; SO = Shutouts; SA = Shots against; SV = Shots saved;SV% = Save percentage;

== Awards and records ==
- Lady Byng Memorial Trophy: || Frank Boucher
- Ching Johnson, Defense, NHL First Team All-Star
- Frank Boucher, Center, NHL First Team All-Star
- Bill Cook, Right Wing, NHL First Team All-Star
- Lester Patrick, Coach, NHL First Team All-Star

== See also ==
- 1932–33 NHL season
