= 1932–33 Chicago Black Hawks season =

NHL ice hockey team season

1932–33 Chicago Black Hawks
- Division: 4th American
- 1932–33 record: 16–20–12
- Home record: 12–7–5
- Road record: 4–16–7
- Goals for: 88
- Goals against: 101

Team information
- General manager: Frederic McLaughlin
- Coach: Emil Iverson(8–7–6); Godfrey Matheson (0–2–0); Tommy Gorman (8–11–6)
- Captain: Helge Bostrom
- Arena: Chicago Coliseum (Nov–Dec); Chicago Stadium (Dec–Mar)

Team leaders
- Goals: Paul Thompson (13)
- Assists: Paul Thompson (20)
- Points: Paul Thompson (33)
- Penalty minutes: Taffy Abel (63)
- Wins: Chuck Gardiner (16)
- Goals against average: Chuck Gardiner (2.01)

The 1932–33 Chicago Black Hawks season was the team's seventh season of play. The team failed to qualify for the playoffs.

== Regular season ==
They were coming off a 2nd-place finish in the American Division the previous year, however, they were put out of the playoffs in the 1st round by the Toronto Maple Leafs. The Black Hawks would start the year with a new head coach, hiring Emil Iverson, however, he was let go after the team got off to a mediocre 8–7–6 start. Godfrey Matheson was hired as an interim coach, and after 2 losses, the Hawks would hire former Ottawa Senators head coach and general manager, Tommy Gorman. Under Gorman, the Hawks would go 8–11–6, and finish in the cellar of the American Division, missing the playoffs for the first time since 1929.

The Black Hawks were forced to start the season at Chicago Coliseum after a disagreement between the club and the owners of Chicago Stadium, however, it was quickly resolved, and the Hawks would move back to their home in early December.

Paul Thompson would lead Chicago offensively, putting up team highs in goals (13), assists (20), and points (33). Tom Cook would have a solid season, earning 12 goals and 26 points, while Johnny Gottselig and Doc Romnes would each get 22 points. The team though would score an NHL low (tied with the Ottawa Senators) 88 goals.

In goal, Chuck Gardiner would have another solid season, as he had a GAA of 2.01, while winning 16 games and earning 5 shutouts.

The Black Hawks would finish in last place in the American Division, finishing 10 points behind the New York Rangers for the final playoff spot, missing the playoffs for the first time in 4 years.

=== Season standings ===
American Division
	GP	W	L	T	GF	GA	PTS
**Boston Bruins**	48	25	15	8	124	88	58
**Detroit Red Wings**	48	25	15	8	111	93	58
**New York Rangers**	48	23	17	8	135	107	54
Chicago Black Hawks	48	16	20	12	88	101	44

Note: GP = Games Played, W = Wins, L = Losses, T = Ties, Pts = Points, GF = Goals For, GA = Goals Against
Teams that qualified for the playoffs are highlighted in bold.

=== Record vs. opponents ===
==== Vs. American Division ====
1932–33 NHL records
Team	**BOS**	**CHI**	**DET**	**NYR**	**Total**
Boston	—	3–2–1	2–3–1	3–3	**8–8–2**
Chicago	2–3–1	—	1–5	2–2–2	**5–10–3**
Detroit	3–2–1	5–1	—	4–2	**12–5–1**
N.Y. Rangers	3–3	2–2–2	2–4	—	**7–9–2**

==== Vs. Canadian Division ====
1932–33 NHL records
Team	**MTL**	**MTM**	**NYA**	**OTT**	**TOR**	**Total**
Boston	4–1–1	4–2	2–2–2	3–1–2	4–1–1	**17–7–6**
Chicago	3–3	2–2–2	2–2–2	2–1–3	2–2–2	**11–10–9**
Detroit	3–2–1	1–4–1	3–0–3	4–1–1	2–3–1	**13–10–7**
N.Y. Rangers	4–1–1	2–3–1	3–2–1	3–0–3	2–4	**14–10–6**

== Schedule and results ==
1932–33 regular season
November

Game	Date	Visitor	Score	Home	Record	Points
1	November 10	Chicago Black Hawks	1–3	Detroit Red Wings	0–1–0	0
2	November 13	New York Americans	1–1	Chicago Black Hawks	0–1–1	1
3	November 17	Toronto Maple Leafs	1–3	Chicago Black Hawks	1–1–1	3
4	November 20	Montreal Canadiens	1–2	Chicago Black Hawks	2–1–1	5
5	November 22	Chicago Black Hawks	1–5	Boston Bruins	2–2–1	5
6	November 24	Chicago Black Hawks	1–1	New York Rangers	2–2–2	6
7	November 26	Chicago Black Hawks	1–2	Montreal Canadiens	2–3–2	6
8	November 29	Chicago Black Hawks	1–3	Ottawa Senators	2–4–2	6

December

Game	Date	Visitor	Score	Home	Record	Points
9	December 4	New York Rangers	3–4	Chicago Black Hawks	3–4–2	8
10	December 6	Ottawa Senators	1–1	Chicago Black Hawks	3–4–3	9
11	December 8	Detroit Red Wings	1–3	Chicago Black Hawks	4–4–3	11
12	December 11	Montreal Maroons	2–2	Chicago Black Hawks	4–4–4	12
13	December 15	Boston Bruins	1–0	Chicago Black Hawks	4–5–4	12
14	December 18	Chicago Black Hawks	0–0	New York Americans	4–5–5	13
15	December 22	Chicago Black Hawks	4–1	Montreal Maroons	5–5–5	15
16	December 24	Chicago Black Hawks	2–1	Toronto Maple Leafs	6–5–5	17
17	December 25	Chicago Black Hawks	0–4	Detroit Red Wings	6–6–5	17
18	December 27	Toronto Maple Leafs	4–3	Chicago Black Hawks	6–7–5	17

January

Game	Date	Visitor	Score	Home	Record	Points
19	January 1	Montreal Canadiens	1–4	Chicago Black Hawks	7–7–5	19
20	January 5	Boston Bruins	0–0	Chicago Black Hawks	7–7–6	20
21	January 8	Montreal Maroons	3–4	Chicago Black Hawks	8–7–6	22
22	January 10	Chicago Black Hawks	1–3	New York Americans	8–8–6	22
23	January 12	Chicago Black Hawks	2–4	Montreal Canadiens	8–9–6	22
24	January 15	New York Rangers	5–0	Chicago Black Hawks	8–10–6	22
25	January 19	New York Americans	0–6	Chicago Black Hawks	9–10–6	24
26	January 22	Ottawa Senators	1–2	Chicago Black Hawks	10–10–6	26
27	January 24	Chicago Black Hawks	0–3	Montreal Maroons	10–11–6	26
28	January 26	Chicago Black Hawks	3–1	New York Rangers	11–11–6	28
29	January 29	Chicago Black Hawks	0–4	New York Americans	11–12–6	28
30	January 31	Chicago Black Hawks	5–1	Boston Bruins	12–12–6	30

February

Game	Date	Visitor	Score	Home	Record	Points
31	February 2	Chicago Black Hawks	1–1	Ottawa Senators	12–12–7	31
32	February 4	Chicago Black Hawks	2–2	Toronto Maple Leafs	12–12–8	32
33	February 5	Chicago Black Hawks	0–1	Detroit Red Wings	12–13–8	32
34	February 9	Detroit Red Wings	4–1	Chicago Black Hawks	12–14–8	32
35	February 12	Montreal Canadiens	0–2	Chicago Black Hawks	13–14–8	34
36	February 16	Boston Bruins	1–2	Chicago Black Hawks	14–14–8	36
37	February 19	Montreal Maroons	0–0	Chicago Black Hawks	14–14–9	37
38	February 21	Chicago Black Hawks	2–2	New York Rangers	14–14–10	38
39	February 23	Chicago Black Hawks	0–2	Montreal Canadiens	14–15–10	38
40	February 26	New York Rangers	4–1	Chicago Black Hawks	14–16–10	38

March

Game	Date	Visitor	Score	Home	Record	Points
41	March 2	New York Americans	2–3	Chicago Black Hawks	15–16–10	40
42	March 5	Toronto Maple Leafs	2–1	Chicago Black Hawks	15–17–10	40
43	March 7	Ottawa Senators	1–5	Chicago Black Hawks	16–17–10	42
44	March 9	Chicago Black Hawks	3–3	Ottawa Senators	16–17–11	43
45	March 11	Chicago Black Hawks	2–6	Montreal Maroons	16–18–11	43
46	March 14	Chicago Black Hawks	2–3	Boston Bruins	16–19–11	43
47	March 19	Detroit Red Wings	4–3	Chicago Black Hawks	16–20–11	43
48	March 23	Chicago Black Hawks	2–2	Toronto Maple Leafs	16–20–12	44

Legend: Win (2 points) Loss (0 points) Tie (1 point)

== Player statistics ==
=== Scoring leaders ===
Player	GP	G	A	Pts	PIM
Paul Thompson	48	13	20	33	27
Tom Cook	48	12	14	26	30
Johnny Gottselig	41	11	11	22	6
Doc Romnes	47	10	12	22	2
Mush March	48	9	11	20	38

=== Goaltending ===
Player	GP	TOI	W	L	T	GA	SO	GAA
Chuck Gardiner	48	3010	16	20	12	101	5	2.01

== See also ==
- 1932–33 NHL season
