= 1933 Stanley Cup Final =

1933 ice hockey championship series

	1	2	3	4	Total
Toronto Maple Leafs	1	1	3	0*	1
New York Rangers	5	3	2	1*	3
- * – Denotes overtime period(s)
- Location(s): New York City: Madison Square Garden (1); Toronto: Maple Leaf Gardens (2–4)
- Format: best-of-five
- Coaches: Toronto: Dick Irvin; New York: Lester Patrick
- Captains: Toronto: Hap Day; New York: Bill Cook
- Dates: April 4–13, 1933
- Series-winning goal: Bill Cook (7:34, OT)
- Hall of Famers: Rangers: Frank Boucher (1958); Bill Cook (1952); Bun Cook (1995); Ching Johnson (1958); Earl Seibert (1963); Babe Siebert (1964); Maple Leafs: Ace Bailey (1975); King Clancy (1958); Charlie Conacher (1961); Hap Day (1961); Red Horner (1965); Busher Jackson (1971); Joe Primeau (1963); Coaches: Dick Irvin (1958, player); Lester Patrick (1947, player)

The 1933 Stanley Cup Final was played between the New York Rangers and the Toronto Maple Leafs, in a rematch of the 1932 Finals. The Rangers won the series 3–1 to win their second Stanley Cup.

== Paths to the Finals ==
Toronto defeated the Boston Bruins 3–2 in a best-of-five series to reach the Finals. New York defeated the Montreal Canadiens 8—5 and Detroit Red Wings 6–3 to reach the Finals.

== Game summaries ==
After game one, the Rangers would vacate Madison Square Garden for the circus. Bill Cook would become the first player to score a Cup-winning goal in overtime.

April 4	Toronto Maple Leafs	1–5	New York Rangers	Madison Square Garden III	Recap
No scoring		First period	12:18 – Bun Cook (2); 13:11 – Cecil Dillon (6)
No scoring		Second period	08:31 – pp – Ott Heller (2); 14:25 – sh – Cecil Dillon (7)
Alex Levinsky (1) – 15:53		Third period	16:55 – Murray Murdoch (2)
Lorne Chabot		Goalie stats	Andy Aitkenhead

April 8	New York Rangers	3–1	Toronto Maple Leafs	Maple Leaf Gardens	Recap
Ott Heller (3) – 08:18; Bill Cook (2) – sh – 11:38		First period	01:10 – Ken Doraty (3)
No scoring		Second period	No scoring
Earl Seibert (1) – 14:39		Third period	No scoring
Andy Aitkenhead		Goalie stats	Lorne Chabot

April 11	New York Rangers	2–3	Toronto Maple Leafs	Maple Leaf Gardens	Recap
Cecil Dillon (8) – sh – 02:21		First period	No scoring
No scoring		Second period	07:21 – pp – Ken Doraty (4)
Butch Keeling (1) – sh – 07:42		Third period	05:29 – pp – Ken Doraty (5); 08:30 – Red Horner (1)
Andy Aitkenhead		Goalie stats	Lorne Chabot

April 13	New York Rangers	1–0	OT	Toronto Maple Leafs	Maple Leaf Gardens	Recap
No scoring		First period		No scoring
No scoring		Second period		No scoring
No scoring		Third period		No scoring
Bill Cook (3) – pp – 07:33		First overtime period		No scoring
Andy Aitkenhead		Goalie stats		Lorne Chabot

New York won series 3–1

== Stanley Cup engraving ==
The 1933 Stanley Cup was presented to Rangers captain Bill Cook by NHL President Frank Calder following the Rangers' 1–0 overtime win over the Maple Leafs in game four.

The following Rangers players and staff had their names engraved on the Stanley Cup

1932–33 New York Rangers

=== Players ===
Centres

- 5 Bill Cook (Captain)
- 7 Frank Boucher
- 12 Art Somers
- 16 Ossie Asmundson

Wingers

- 6 Fred Bun Cook
- 9 Murray Murdoch
- 11 Gord Pettinger
- 12 Melville Butch Keeling

Defencemen

- 3 Ivan Ching Johnson
- 4 Albert Babe Siebert
- 8 Cecil Dillon
- 14 Erhardt Ott Heller
- 15 Doug Brennan

Goaltenders

- 1 Andy Aitkenhead

=== Coaching and administrative staff ===
- Lester Patrick (Manager-Coach)
- Harry Westerby (Trainer)
- William Carey (President-Owner)*
- Richard Hoyt (Vice President-Owner)*

* Left off the Stanley Cup, but included on the team picture.

=== Stanley Cup engraving ===
- The New York Rangers included two smaller rings on the Stanley Cup. Due to the size of the first ring, no playoff score was included. On the second ring, they honoured Lester Patrick (See 1934 Chicago Black Hawks for the wording.) Lester Patrick's name was put on the Stanley Cup twice in 1933. Even with adding 2 rings, the New York Rangers did not include any playoff scores on the 2nd ring, even though there was more than enough room.
- Rangers did not include President William Carey's name on the Stanley Cup. He is the only President of a Stanley Cup-winning team left off the Cup since the engraving of winning members became an annual tradition in 1924. John Hammond returned as President of the New York Rangers in the offseason, forcing out Carey and Hoyt; this may be the reason William Carey and Richard Hoyt were left off the Stanley Cup.

== See also ==
- 1932–33 NHL season

== References & notes ==
- NHL (2000). Total Stanley Cup. Dan Diamond & Associates.
- Podnieks, Andrew; Hockey Hall of Fame (2004). Lord Stanley's Cup. Bolton, Ont.: Fenn Pub. pp 12, 50. ISBN 978-1-55168-261-7

Preceded by Toronto Maple Leafs; 1932	New York Rangers; Stanley Cup champions 1933	Succeeded by Chicago Black Hawks; 1934
