= Andy Aitkenhead =

Canadian ice hockey player

- Born: March 6, 1904 Glasgow, Scotland, UK
- Died: October 21, 1968 (aged 64) Multnomah County, Oregon, U.S.
- Height: 5 ft 8 in (173 cm)
- Weight: 150 lb (68 kg; 10 st 10 lb)
- Position: Goaltender
- Caught: Left
- Played for: New York Rangers
- Playing career: 1926–1940

Andrew Aitkenhead (March 6, 1904 – October 21, 1968) was a Canadian ice hockey goaltender for the New York Rangers of the National Hockey League between 1932 and 1934. Born in Glasgow, Aitkenhead came to Canada as a young child with his family, and grew up in Yorkton, Saskatchewan.

== Playing career ==
Andy Aitkenkead played ten years in various minor leagues in Western Canada, most notably appearing in the 1923 Memorial Cup with the Saskatoon Quakers. After turning pro, Aitkenhead took two teams to the Allan Cup finals, the Saskatoon Nationals and the Saskatoon Empires, in 1924 and 1926 respectively.

Originally taken by the Rangers in the Inter-league draft from the Saskatoon Shieks in 1928, his rights were sent back and forth between the Rangers and the Portland Buckaroos of the PCHL, until he finally signed with the Rangers as a free agent in 1931. He made his debut for the Rangers on November 10, 1932, at the Montreal Forum against the Montreal Maroons. He won the job as starting goaltender for the Rangers from John Ross Roach, who had twice led the team to the Stanley Cup Final. In his first two seasons in New York, Aitkenhead played in every single game for the Rangers, and he put up solid numbers. In his first season in New York, Aitkenhead was fourth in the league in goals against average, as well as fourth in wins. In that rookie season, he led the Rangers to the Stanley Cup, their second, in 1933. He posted a shutout in the clinching game, in overtime, against the Toronto Maple Leafs. The following season, Aitkenhead finished fifth overall in goals against, yet second in wins, and third in shutouts, however the Rangers were eliminated by the Maroons in the opening round of the playoffs. In 1935 Aitkenhead struggled, and eventually lost the starting job to Dave Kerr. He played only 10 games that season. Kerr later said that Aitkenhead's obsession with his game were what got to him, and led to his departure from the NHL. After 1935 Andy Aitkenhead was returned to the minor leagues. Aitkenhead spent 6 seasons with the Portland Buckaroos of the PCHL before retiring from hockey in 1941.

== Legacy ==
In the 2009 book 100 Ranger Greats, the authors ranked Aitkenhead at No. 97 all-time of the 901 New York Rangers who had played during the team's first 82 seasons.

Aitkenhead was inducted into the Oregon Sports Hall of Fame in 1987.

== Career statistics ==
=== Regular season and playoffs ===
			Regular season								Playoffs
Season	Team	League	GP	W	L	T	Min	GA	SO	GAA	GP	W	L	T	Min	GA	SO	GAA
1921–22	Yorkton Terriers	SIHA	6	3	3	0	480	19	0	2.38	—	—	—	—	—	—	—	—
1922–23	Saskatoon St. George	SCJHL	—	—	—	—	—	—	—	—	—	—	—	—	—	—	—	—
1922–23	Saskatoon Quakers	M-Cup	—	—	—	—	—	—	—	—	2	1	0	1	120	3	0	1.50
1923–24	Saskatoon Nationals	N-SSHL	5	4	0	1	350	5	1	0.86	—	—	—	—	—	—	—	—
1923–24	Saskatoon Nationals	Al-Cup	—	—	—	—	—	—	—	—	2	1	1	0	120	7	0	3.50
1925–26	Saskatoon Empires	N-SSHL	4	4	0	0	240	12	1	3.00	—	—	—	—	—	—	—	—
1925–26	Saskatoon Empires	Al-Cup	—	—	—	—	—	—	—	—	2	0	1	1	140	9	0	3.86
1926–27	Saskatoon Sheiks	PHL	32	14	15	3	1902	94	7	2.97	4	1	3	0	240	7	0	1.75
1927–28	Saskatoon Sheiks	PHL	28	18	5	5	1733	41	7	1.42	—	—	—	—	—	—	—	—
1928–29	Springfield Indians	Can-Am	40	13	14	13	2550	58	6	1.36	—	—	—	—	—	—	—	—
1929–30	Portland Buckaroos	PCHL	36	20	10	6	2160	34	16	0.94	—	—	—	—	—	—	—	—
1929–30	Springfield Indians	Can-Am	—	—	—	—	—	—	—	—	4	1	3	0	240	8	0	2.00
1930–31	Portland Buckaroos	PCHL	35	12	15	8	2100	61	6	1.74	—	—	—	—	—	—	—	—
1931–32	Bronx Tigers	Can-Am	33	16	13	4	2040	74	4	2.18	4	0	1	1	130	5	0	2.31
1932-33	New York Rangers	NHL	48	23	17	8	2970	107	3	2.16	8	6	1	1	488	13	2	1.60
1933-34	New York Rangers	NHL	48	21	19	8	2990	113	7	2.27	2	0	1	1	120	2	1	1.00
1934-35	New York Rangers	NHL	10	3	7	0	610	37	1	3.64	—	—	—	—	—	—	—	—
1934–35	Philadelphia Arrows	Can-Am	1	1	0	0	60	2	0	2.00	—	—	—	—	—	—	—	—
1934–35	Portland Buckaroos	NWHL	21	11	4	6	1260	40	5	1.90	3	1	2	0	180	4	1	1.33
1935–36	Portland Buckaroos	NWHL	40	18	14	8	2520	68	5	1.62	3	1	2	0	190	5	0	1.58
1936–37	Spokane Clippers	PCHL	1	1	0	0	60	0	1	0.00	—	—	—	—	—	—	—	—
1936–37	Portland Buckaroos	PCHL	40	22	13	5	2400	72	7	1.80	3	3	0	0	180	3	0	1.00
1937–38	Portland Buckaroos	PCHL	42	16	18	8	2620	85	5	1.95	2	1	1	0	120	4	0	2.00
1938–39	Seattle Seahawks	PCHL	1	—	—	—	60	3	0	3.00	—	—	—	—	—	—	—	—
1938–39	Portland Buckaroos	PCHL	48	31	9	8	2880	114	9	2.38	5	4	1	0	300	10	1	2.00
1939–40	Portland Buckaroos	PCHL	40	17	18	5	2400	98	4	2.45	5	1	4	0	300	17	0	3.40
1940–41	Portland Buckaroos	PCHL	1	1	0	0	60	2	0	2.00	—	—	—	—	—	—	—	—
NHL totals			106	47	43	16	6570	257	11	2.35	10	6	2	2	608	15	3	1.48

== See also ==
- List of National Hockey League players born in the United Kingdom
