= Art Herchenratter =

Canadian ice hockey player

- Born: November 24, 1917; Kitchener, Ontario, Canada
- Died: August 1, 1989 (aged 71); Kitchener, Ontario, Canada
- Height: 6 ft 0 in (183 cm)
- Weight: 185 lb (84 kg; 13 st 3 lb)
- Position: Left wing
- Shot: Left
- Played for: Detroit Red Wings
- Playing career: 1938–1950

Arthur Jacob Herchenratter (November 24, 1917 — August 1, 1989) was a Canadian ice hockey player who played 10 games in the National Hockey League with the Detroit Red Wings during the 1940–41 season. The rest of his career, which lasted from 1938 to 1950, was spent in various minor leagues.

== Career statistics ==
=== Regular season and playoffs ===
			Regular season					Playoffs
Season	Team	League	GP	G	A	Pts	PIM	GP	G	A	Pts	PIM
1936–37	Kitchener Greenshirts	OHA	13	7	1	8	6	2	0	0	0	5
1937–38	Kitchener Greenshirts	OHA	11	4	6	10	0	—	—	—	—	—
1938–39	Detroit Holzbaugh	MOHL	26	9	5	14	4	7	1	2	3	2
1939–40	Windsor Bulldogs	MOHL	40	31	16	47	14	4	2	1	3	0
1940–41	Indianapolis Capitals	AHL	39	1	6	7	6	—	—	—	—	—
1940–41	Detroit Red Wings	NHL	10	1	2	3	2	—	—	—	—	—
1941–42	Kitchener Army	OHA Sr	—	—	—	—	—	1	1	1	2	2
1941–42	Omaha Knights	AHA	22	7	5	12	8	—	—	—	—	—
1941–42	New Haven Eagles	AHL	13	4	1	5	4	—	—	—	—	—
1942–43	Kitchener Army	KNDHL	—	—	—	—	—	1	1	1	2	2
1943–44	Truro Bearcats	NSHDL	3	2	1	3	0	—	—	—	—	—
1945–46	Stratford Indians	OHA Sr	2	0	0	0	0	5	0	5	5	0
1946–47	Houston Huskies	USHL	15	6	7	13	4	—	—	—	—	—
1946–47	Springfield Indians	AHL	22	2	5	7	2	—	—	—	—	—
1947–48	Kitchener-Waterloo Dutchmen	OHA Sr	19	5	16	21	10	10	2	5	7	8
1948–49	Kitchener-Waterloo Dutchmen	OHA Sr	32	7	10	17	14	4	0	0	0	0
1949–50	Kitchener-Waterloo Dutchmen	OHA Sr	14	2	1	3	4	—	—	—	—	—
NHL totals			10	1	2	3	2	—	—	—	—	—
