= 1918 Allan Cup =

Canadian senior ice hockey championship

The Allan Cup trophy

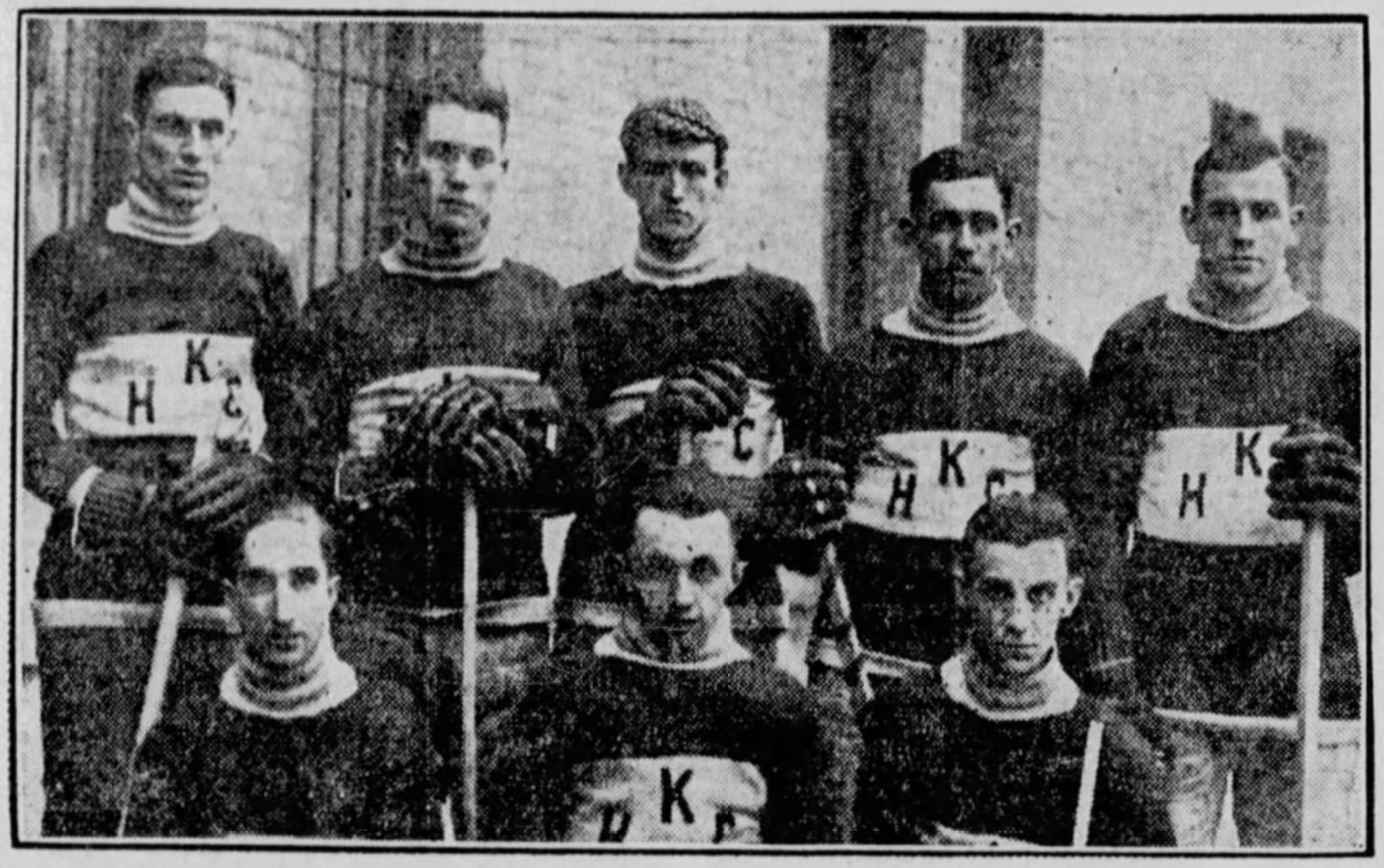
Kitchener Greenshirts in 1917–18.

The 1918 Allan Cup was the Canadian senior ice hockey championship for the 1917–18 season. The final challenge was hosted by the Kitchener Greenshirts and Toronto, Ontario. The 1918 playoff marked the 11th time the Allan Cup had a champion. The 1918 Allan Cup also marked the final time the Allan Cup would be awarded through a challenge series.

== First challenge ==
The Toronto Dentals were challenged by the Kitchener Greenshirts, for the OHA Senior championship. The series took place as a home-and-home series.

- Toronto Dentals (Allan Cup holder)
- Kitchener Greenshirts (Challenger)

=== Results ===
Kitchener Greenshirts 4 - Toronto Dentals 4
Kitchener Greenshirts 3 - Toronto Dentals 0

Kitchener Greenshirts win the series 7-4 and conquer the Allan Cup.

== Second challenge ==
The Kitchener Greenshirts received a challenge from the Port Arthur Columbus Club, Thunder Bay senior champions. The series took place in Toronto, Ontario.

- Kitchener Greenshirts (Allan Cup holder)
- Port Arthur Columbus Club (Challenger)

=== Results ===
Kitchener Greenshirts 20 - Port Arthur Columbus Club 2
Second game conceded

Kitchener Greenshirts win the series 20-2 and carry the Allan Cup.

== Third challenge ==
Kitchener Greenshirts received a challenge from the Winnipeg Ypres, Western Canada Senior champions. Played in Toronto, Ontario.

- Kitchener Greenshirts (Allan Cup holder)
- Winnipeg Ypres (Challenger)

=== Results ===
Winnipeg Ypres 3 - Kitchener Greenshirts 2
Kitchener Greenshirts 4 - Winnipeg Ypres 1

Kitchener Greenshirts carry the Allan Cup, winning the series 6-goals-to-4. With no more challengers accepted in time to play, the Greenshirts win the 1918 Allan Cup.
