= Jack Keating =

Canadian ice hockey player

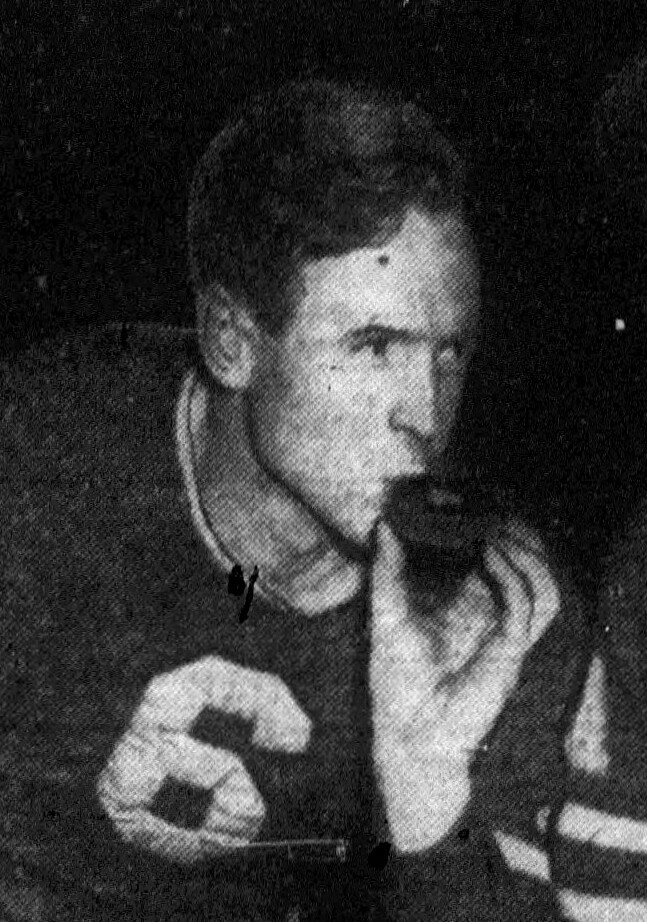
- Keating, circa 1947
- Born: October 9, 1916; Kitchener, Ontario, Canada
- Died: December 19, 1951 (aged 35); Indianapolis, Indiana, United States
- Height: 6 ft 0 in (183 cm)
- Weight: 180 lb (82 kg; 12 st 12 lb)
- Position: Left wing
- Shot: Left
- Played for: Detroit Red Wings; Harringay Racers; Richmond Hawks
- Playing career: 1936–1948

John Thomas "Jack, Red" Keating (October 9, 1916 — December 19, 1951) was a Canadian ice hockey player who played 12 games in the National Hockey League with the Detroit Red Wings during the 1938–39 and 1939–40 seasons. The rest of his career, which lasted from 1936 to 1948, was spent in the minor leagues, as well as two seasons in the English National League. Keating was born in Kitchener, Ontario. From 1943 to 1945 he served in the military during the Second World War. While playing for the Harringay Racers in 1937–38, he was the top goal scorer in the UK with 29 goals. In 1946, he married Blanche Kernel in Indianapolis and had 3 children. He graduated from Optometry school in 1951 and died in Indianapolis that year of cancer.

== Career statistics ==
=== Regular season and playoffs ===
			Regular season					Playoffs
Season	Team	League	GP	G	A	Pts	PIM	GP	G	A	Pts	PIM
1934–35	Kitchener Greenshirts	OHA	14	11	10	21	4	2	1	0	1	0
1935–36	Kitchener Greenshirts	OHA	7	6	1	7	10	4	3	1	4	0
1936–37	Richmond Hawks	ENL	40	13	2	15	8	—	—	—	—	—
1937–38	Harringay Racers	ENL	—	18	2	20	—	—	—	—	—	—
1938–39	Detroit Red Wings	NHL	1	1	0	1	2	—	—	—	—	—
1938–39	Pittsburgh Hornets	IAHL	50	19	12	31	18	—	—	—	—	—
1939–40	Detroit Red Wings	NHL	11	2	0	2	2	—	—	—	—	—
1939–40	Indianapolis Capitals	IAHL	32	8	12	20	4	5	1	2	3	0
1940–41	Indianapolis Capitals	AHL	53	21	18	39	6	—	—	—	—	—
1941–42	Indianapolis Capitals	AHL	55	19	25	44	14	10	9	9	18	0
1942–43	Indianapolis Capitals	AHL	7	4	4	8	0	—	—	—	—	—
1945–46	Indianapolis Capitals	AHL	14	8	3	11	0	5	1	1	2	0
1945–46	Hollywood Wolves	PCHL	8	5	2	7	6	—	—	—	—	—
1946–47	Los Angeles Monarchs	PCHL	55	36	26	62	16	10	3	3	6	26
1947–48	Los Angeles Monarchs	PCHL	45	31	19	50	26	—	—	—	—	—
IAHL/AHL totals			211	79	74	153	42	20	11	12	23	0
NHL totals			12	3	0	3	4	—	—	—	—	—
