= 1932–33 NHL season =

Professional ice hockey league season

- League: National Hockey League
- Sport: Ice hockey
- Duration: November 10, 1932 – April 13, 1933
- Games: 48
- Teams: 9

Regular season
- Season champions: Boston Bruins
- Season MVP: Eddie Shore (Bruins)
- Top scorer: Bill Cook (Rangers)
- Canadian Division champions: Toronto Maple Leafs
- American Division champions: Boston Bruins

Stanley Cup
- Champions: New York Rangers
- Runners-up: Toronto Maple Leafs

NHL seasons
- ← 1931–32 1933–34 →

The 1932–33 NHL season was the 16th season of the National Hockey League (NHL). Nine teams each played 48 games. The Ottawa Senators rejoined the league after missing one season, while the Detroit team was renamed the Detroit Red Wings. The New York Rangers beat the Toronto Maple Leafs three games to one for the Stanley Cup.

== League business ==
After sitting out for a season due to financial difficulties, the Ottawa Senators rejoined the NHL. The Philadelphia Quakers never rejoined the NHL after sitting out the 1931–32 season.

Detroit Falcons were renamed as the Detroit Red Wings.

Although the Montreal Maroons had Flat Walsh, Dave Kerr and Normie Smith for goal, they were interested in acquiring Chuck Gardiner of Chicago. James Strachan offered $10,000 plus one of his goalkeepers, but there was no deal.

Billy Coutu, expelled from the NHL in 1927, was reinstated to the NHL, but never returned.

=== Rule changes ===
This season, the NHL started allowing a substitute to serve penalties for goaltender's penalties.

The NHL now required a captain or alternate captain to be on the ice at all times.

== Regular season ==
There was a record number of four goaltenders who served as captains for their teams: George Hainsworth, Roy Worters, Charlie Gardiner, and Alex Connell. The Red Wings and Boston Bruins tied for the best overall record with 58 points apiece, but it was Boston that was awarded first overall due to a better head-to-head record. Ottawa started the season up in second place in the Canadian Division near the .500 mark at mid season, but collapsed in the second half and finished last. President Ahearn instructed coach Cy Denneny to fine players who displayed indifferent hockey. At the same time, he stated that Hector Kilrea was not for sale.

The Montreal Canadiens, under new coach Newsy Lalonde, spent much of the season in last place, but made the playoffs when they rallied to finish third. Toronto, with its Kid line, finished first for the first time as the Maple Leafs. Led by the play of Eddie Shore, the Boston Bruins finished first in the American Division.

The first forfeit in NHL history occurred during a Black Hawks-Bruins game at Boston Garden on March 14, 1933. Chicago coach Tommy Gorman punched referee Bill Stewart following a disputed overtime goal by Boston's Marty Barry. Stewart threw several punches at Gorman before summoning the police to remove Gorman from the visitors' bench. The Hawks refused to continue the game without their coach. The puck was placed at center ice by Stewart. Boston's Cooney Weiland scored without any Hawks on the ice—at which point the game was forfeited to Boston. Ironically, referee Stewart would coach the Black Hawks to the Stanley Cup in 1937–1938.

=== Final standings ===
American Division
	GP	W	L	T	GF	GA	PTS
**Boston Bruins**	48	25	15	8	124	88	58
**Detroit Red Wings**	48	25	15	8	111	93	58
**New York Rangers**	48	23	17	8	135	107	54
Chicago Black Hawks	48	16	20	12	88	101	44

Canadian Division
	GP	W	L	T	GF	GA	PTS
**Toronto Maple Leafs**	48	24	18	6	119	111	54
**Montreal Maroons**	48	22	20	6	135	119	50
**Montreal Canadiens**	48	18	25	5	92	115	41
New York Americans	48	15	22	11	91	118	41
Ottawa Senators	48	11	27	10	88	131	32

Note: W = Wins, L = Losses, T = Ties, GF = Goals For, GA = Goals Against, Pts = Points
Teams that qualified for the playoffs are highlighted in bold.

== Playoffs ==
=== Playoff bracket ===
The top three teams in each division qualified for the playoffs. The two division winners met in a best-of-five Stanley Cup semifinal series. The divisional second-place teams and third-place teams played off in a two-game total-goals series to determine the participants for the other two-game total-goals semifinal series. The semifinal winners then played in a best-of-five Stanley Cup Finals.

First round
C2	Mtl Maroons	2G
A2	Detroit	5G
C3	Mtl Canadiens	5G
A3	NY Rangers	8G

Semifinals
C1	Toronto	3
A1	Boston	2
A2	Detroit	3G
A3	NY Rangers	6G

Final
C1	Toronto	1
A3	NY Rangers	3

=== Quarterfinals ===
==== (A2) Detroit Red Wings vs. (C2) Montreal Maroons ====
March 25	Detroit Red Wings	2–0	Montreal Maroons	Montreal Forum	Recap
Larry Aurie (1) – 08:40		First period	No scoring
No scoring		Second period	No scoring
Carl Voss (1) – 03:42		Third period	No scoring
John Ross Roach		Goalie stats	Dave Kerr

March 28	Montreal Maroons	2–3	Detroit Red Wings	Olympia Stadium	Recap
No scoring		First period	No scoring
Hooley Smith (1) – 10:06; Hooley Smith (2) – pp – 12:08		Second period	19:51 – Herbie Lewis (1)
No scoring		Third period	03:47 – Ebbie Goodfellow (1); 15:54 – John Gallagher (1)
Dave Kerr		Goalie stats	John Ross Roach

Detroit won series on total goals 5–2

==== (A3) New York Rangers vs. (C3) Montreal Canadiens ====
March 26	Montreal Canadiens	2–5	New York Rangers	Madison Square Garden III	Recap
No scoring		First period	02:34 – pp – Bill Cook (1); 03:01 – pp – Bun Cook (1)
No scoring		Second period	05:36 – Murray Murdoch (1)
Albert Leduc (1) – 18:45; Aurele Joliat (1) – 19:29		Third period	13:10 – Cecil Dillon (1); 17:44 – Frank Boucher (1)
George Hainsworth		Goalie stats	Andy Aitkenhead

March 28	New York Rangers	3–3	Montreal Canadiens	Montreal Forum	Recap
Art Somers (1) – 11:39		First period	04:50 – Wildor Larochelle (1); 07:56 – Aurele Joliat (2)
No scoring		Second period	11:34 – Hago Harrington (1)
Cecil Dillon (2) – 12:50; Cecil Dillon (3) – 18:11		Third period	No scoring
Andy Aitkenhead		Goalie stats	George Hainsworth

New York won series on total goals 8–5

=== Semifinals ===
==== (A1) Boston Bruins vs. (C1) Toronto Maple Leafs ====
Game five of this series is the second longest game in NHL history, it was the longest at the time.

March 25	Toronto Maple Leafs	1–2	OT	Boston Bruins	Boston Garden	Recap
Bill Thoms (1) – 14:03		First period		No scoring
No scoring		Second period		02:14 – Dit Clapper (1)
No scoring		Third period		No scoring
No scoring		First overtime period		14:14 – Marty Barry
Lorne Chabot		Goalie stats		Tiny Thompson

March 28	Toronto Maple Leafs	1–0	OT	Boston Bruins	Boston Garden	Recap
No scoring		First period		No scoring
No scoring		Second period		No scoring
No scoring		Third period		No scoring
Busher Jackson (1) – 15:03		First overtime period		No scoring
Lorne Chabot		Goalie stats		Tiny Thompson

March 30	Boston Bruins	2–1	OT	Toronto Maple Leafs	Maple Leaf Gardens	Recap
No scoring		First period		No scoring
Nels Stewart (1) – 04:47		Second period		No scoring
No scoring		Third period		14:34 – Ken Doraty (1)
Eddie Shore (1) – 04:23		First overtime period		No scoring
Tiny Thompson		Goalie stats		Lorne Chabot

April 1	Boston Bruins	3–5	Toronto Maple Leafs	Maple Leaf Gardens	Recap
Vic Ripley (1) – 00:32		First period	06:40 – Charlie Sands (1); 14:40 – pp – Busher Jackson (2)
Nels Stewart (2) – 04:43; Marty Barry (2) – 18:01		Second period	02:16 – Busher Jackson (3); 17:14 – Charlie Conacher (1)
No scoring		Third period	03:39 – Charlie Sands (2)
Tiny Thompson		Goalie stats	Lorne Chabot

April 3	Boston Bruins	0–1	6OT	Toronto Maple Leafs	Maple Leaf Gardens	Recap
No scoring		First period		No scoring
No scoring		Second period		No scoring
No scoring		Third period		No scoring
No scoring		Sixth overtime period		04:46 – Ken Doraty (2)
Tiny Thompson		Goalie stats		Lorne Chabot

Toronto won series 3–2

==== (A2) Detroit Red Wings vs. (A3) New York Rangers ====
March 30	Detroit Red Wings	0–2	New York Rangers	Madison Square Garden III	Recap
No scoring		First period	17:46 – Ching Johnson (1)
No scoring		Second period	13:48 – Cecil Dillon (4)
No scoring		Third period	No scoring
John Ross Roach		Goalie stats	Andy Aitkenhead

April 2	New York Rangers	4–3	Detroit Red Wings	Olympia Stadium	Recap
Ott Heller (1) – 05:50; Cecil Dillon (5) – sh – 14:24		First period	05:17 – John Sorrell (1)
Babe Siebert (1) – 05:05		Second period	14:50 – Doug Young (1)
17:32 – Frank Boucher (2)		Third period	06:53 – John Sorrell (2)
Andy Aitkenhead		Goalie stats	John Ross Roach

New York won series on total goals 6–3

=== Stanley Cup Finals ===
April 4	Toronto Maple Leafs	1–5	New York Rangers	Madison Square Garden III	Recap
No scoring		First period	12:18 – Bun Cook (2); 13:11 – Cecil Dillon (6)
No scoring		Second period	08:31 – pp – Ott Heller (2); 14:25 – sh – Cecil Dillon (7)
Alex Levinsky (1) – 15:53		Third period	16:55 – Murray Murdoch (2)
Lorne Chabot		Goalie stats	Andy Aitkenhead

April 8	New York Rangers	3–1	Toronto Maple Leafs	Maple Leaf Gardens	Recap
Ott Heller (3) – 08:18; Bill Cook (2) – sh – 11:38		First period	01:10 – Ken Doraty (3)
No scoring		Second period	No scoring
Earl Seibert (1) – 14:39		Third period	No scoring
Andy Aitkenhead		Goalie stats	Lorne Chabot

April 11	New York Rangers	2–3	Toronto Maple Leafs	Maple Leaf Gardens	Recap
Cecil Dillon (8) – sh – 02:21		First period	No scoring
No scoring		Second period	07:21 – pp – Ken Doraty (4)
Butch Keeling (1) – sh – 07:42		Third period	05:29 – pp – Ken Doraty (5); 08:30 – Red Horner (1)
Andy Aitkenhead		Goalie stats	Lorne Chabot

April 13	New York Rangers	1–0	OT	Toronto Maple Leafs	Maple Leaf Gardens	Recap
No scoring		First period		No scoring
No scoring		Second period		No scoring
No scoring		Third period		No scoring
Bill Cook (3) – pp – 07:33		First overtime period		No scoring
Andy Aitkenhead		Goalie stats		Lorne Chabot

New York won series 3–1

== Awards ==
It was the first season that league president Frank Calder named the best rookie of the year. The first winner was Carl Voss of the Detroit Red Wings. Although Tiny Thompson was named 'most valuable goaltender', he was not named to the NHL All-Star team.

Rookie of the Year: (Best first-year player)	Carl Voss, Detroit Red Wings
Hart Trophy: (Most valuable player)	Eddie Shore, Boston Bruins
Lady Byng Trophy: (Excellence and sportsmanship)	Frank Boucher, New York Rangers
O'Brien Cup: (Canadian Division champions)	Toronto Maple Leafs
Prince of Wales Trophy: (American Division champions)	Boston Bruins
Vezina Trophy: (Top goaltender)	Tiny Thompson, Boston Bruins

=== All-Star teams ===
First Team	Position	Second Team
John Ross Roach, Detroit Red Wings	G	Chuck Gardiner, Chicago Black Hawks
Eddie Shore, Boston Bruins	D	King Clancy, Toronto Maple Leafs
Ching Johnson, New York Rangers	D	Lionel Conacher, Montreal Maroons
Frank Boucher, New York Rangers	C	Howie Morenz, Montreal Canadiens
Bill Cook, New York Rangers	RW	Charlie Conacher, Toronto Maple Leafs
Baldy Northcott, Montreal Maroons	LW	Busher Jackson, Toronto Maple Leafs
Lester Patrick, New York Rangers	Coach	Dick Irvin, Toronto Maple Leafs

== Player statistics ==
=== Leading scorers ===
Note: GP = Games played, G = Goals, A = Assists, Pts = Points, PIM = Penalties in minutes

Player	Team	GP	G	A	Pts	PIM
Bill Cook	New York Rangers	48	28	22	50	51
Busher Jackson	Toronto Maple Leafs	48	27	17	44	43
Baldy Northcott	Montreal Maroons	48	22	21	43	30
Hooley Smith	Montreal Maroons	48	20	21	41	66
Paul Haynes	Montreal Maroons	48	16	25	41	18
Aurel Joliat	Montreal Canadiens	48	18	21	39	53
Marty Barry	Boston Bruins	48	24	13	37	40
Bun Cook	New York Rangers	48	22	15	37	35
Nels Stewart	Boston Bruins	47	18	18	36	62
Howie Morenz	Montreal Canadiens	46	14	21	35	32

Source: NHL.

=== Leading goaltenders ===
Note: GP = Games played; Mins = Minutes played; GA = Goals against; SO = Shutouts; GAA = Goals against average

Player	Team	GP	W	L	T	Mins	GA	SO	GAA
Tiny Thompson	Boston Bruins	48	25	15	8	3000	88	11	1.76
John Ross Roach	Detroit Red Wings	48	25	15	8	2970	93	10	1.88
Charlie Gardiner	Chicago Black Hawks	48	16	20	12	3010	101	5	2.01
Andy Aitkenhead	New York Rangers	48	23	17	8	2970	107	3	2.16
Lorne Chabot	Toronto Maple Leafs	48	24	18	6	2946	111	5	2.26
Dave Kerr	Montreal Maroons	25	14	8	3	1520	58	4	2.29

Source: NHL.

== Coaches ==
=== American Division ===
- Boston Bruins: Art Ross
- Chicago Black Hawks: Emil Iverson and Tommy Gorman
- Detroit Red Wings: Jack Adams
- New York Rangers: Lester Patrick

=== Canadian Division ===
- Montreal Canadiens: Newsy Lalonde
- Montreal Maroons: Eddie Gerard
- New York Americans: Bullet Joe Simpson
- Ottawa Senators: Cy Denneny
- Toronto Maple Leafs: Dick Irvin

== Debuts ==
The following is a list of players of note who played their first NHL game in 1932–33 (listed with their first team, asterisk(*) marks debut in playoffs):

- Art Wiebe, Chicago Black Hawks
- Eddie Wiseman, Detroit Red Wings
- Charlie Sands, Toronto Maple Leafs
- Buzz Boll*, Toronto Maple Leafs
- Bill Thoms, Toronto Maple Leafs

== Last games ==
The following is a list of players of note that played their last game in the NHL in 1932–33 (listed with their last team):

- George Owen, Boston Bruins
- Billy Burch, Chicago Black Hawks, last active player from the Hamilton Tigers franchise.
- Reg Noble, Montreal Maroons
- Hib Milks, Ottawa Senators
- Harold Darragh, Toronto Maple Leafs

== See also ==
- 1932–33 NHL transactions
- List of Stanley Cup champions
- 1932 in sports
- 1933 in sports
