= Rudolph Kampman =

Canadian ice hockey player

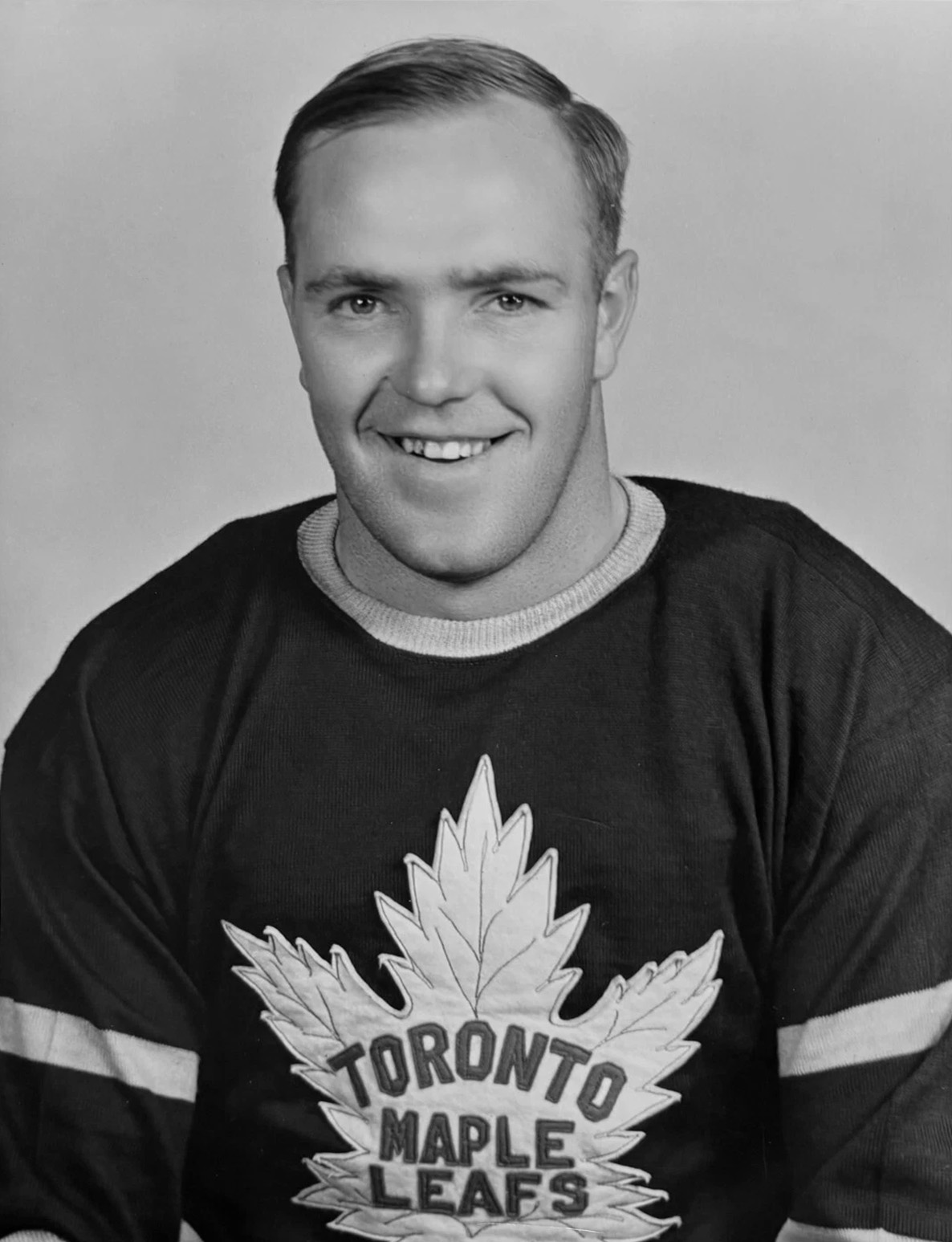
- Kampan with the Toronto Maple Leafs
- Born: March 12, 1914 Berlin, Ontario, Canada
- Died: December 22, 1987 (aged 73)
- Height: 5 ft 10 in (178 cm)
- Weight: 187 lb (85 kg; 13 st 5 lb)
- Position: Defence
- Shot: Right
- Played for: Toronto Maple Leafs
- Playing career: 1934–1951

Rudolph Philip "Bingo" Kampman (March 12, 1914 – December 22, 1987) was a Canadian ice hockey defenceman. He played in the National Hockey League with the Toronto Maple Leafs between 1937 and 1942. He was born in Berlin, Ontario.

== Career statistics ==
=== Regular season and playoffs ===
			Regular season					Playoffs
Season	Team	League	GP	G	A	Pts	PIM	GP	G	A	Pts	PIM
1931–32	Kitchener Greenshirts	OHA	1	0	0	0	0	—	—	—	—	—
1932–33	Kitchener Empires	OHA-B	1	1	1	2	0	—	—	—	—	—
1933–34	Kitchener Redshirts	OHA	16	10	1	11	26	4	4	0	4	2
1934–35	Kitchener Greenshirts	OHA Sr	13	4	2	6	10	3	1	0	1	4
1934–35	Kitchener Greenshirts	Al-Cup	—	—	—	—	—	2	0	0	0	2
1935–36	Creighton Mines	NOHA	8	0	1	1	25	5	2	0	2	13
1935–36	Falconridge Falcons	Al-Cup	—	—	—	—	—	17	3	4	7	31
1936–37	Sudbury Frood Miners	NOHA	14	2	3	5	27	2	0	0	0	4
1936–37	Kitchener Greenshirts	OHA Sr	2	0	1	1	0	—	—	—	—	—
1936–37	Sudbury Frood Miners	Al-Cup	—	—	—	—	—	11	2	4	6	10
1937–38	Toronto Maple Leafs	NHL	32	1	2	3	56	7	0	1	1	6
1937–38	Syracuse Stars	IAHL	12	2	1	3	4	—	—	—	—	—
1938–39	Toronto Maple Leafs	NHL	41	2	8	10	52	10	1	1	2	20
1939–40	Toronto Maple Leafs	NHL	39	6	9	15	59	10	0	0	0	0
1940–41	Toronto Maple Leafs	NHL	39	1	4	5	53	7	0	0	0	0
1941–42	Toronto Maple Leafs	NHL	38	4	7	11	67	13	0	2	2	12
1942–43	Halifax Army	NSDHL	8	4	3	7	18	4	0	1	1	14
1942–43	Ottawa Commandos	QSHL	—	—	—	—	—	1	0	0	0	0
1942–43	Ottawa Commandos	Al-Cup	—	—	—	—	—	12	3	4	7	14
1943–44	Halifax Crescents	NSDHL	2	0	1	1	2	—	—	—	—	—
1943–44	New Glasgow Bombers	NSAPC	2	0	0	0	4	2	0	0	0	0
1944–45	Dartmouth RCAF	NSDHL	5	0	0	0	8	3	0	0	0	4
1945–46	Providence Reds	AHL	27	4	8	12	12	2	0	0	0	0
1946–47	St. Louis Flyers	AHL	45	4	14	18	44	—	—	—	—	—
1947–48	St. Louis Flyers	AHL	46	4	13	17	29	—	—	—	—	—
1948–49	Fresno Falcons	PCHL	69	6	14	20	82	3	0	0	0	4
1949–50	Fresno Falcons	PCHL	37	3	6	9	27	—	—	—	—	—
1949–50	Nanaimo Clippers	BCIHA	9	2	2	4	14	8	1	0	1	8
1950–51	Kitchener-Waterloo Dutchmen	OHA Sr	23	2	3	5	20	—	—	—	—	—
NHL totals			189	14	30	44	287	47	1	4	5	38

== Awards and achievements ==
1942 Stanley Cup Championship (Toronto Maple Leafs)
