= Ken Doraty =

Canadian ice hockey player

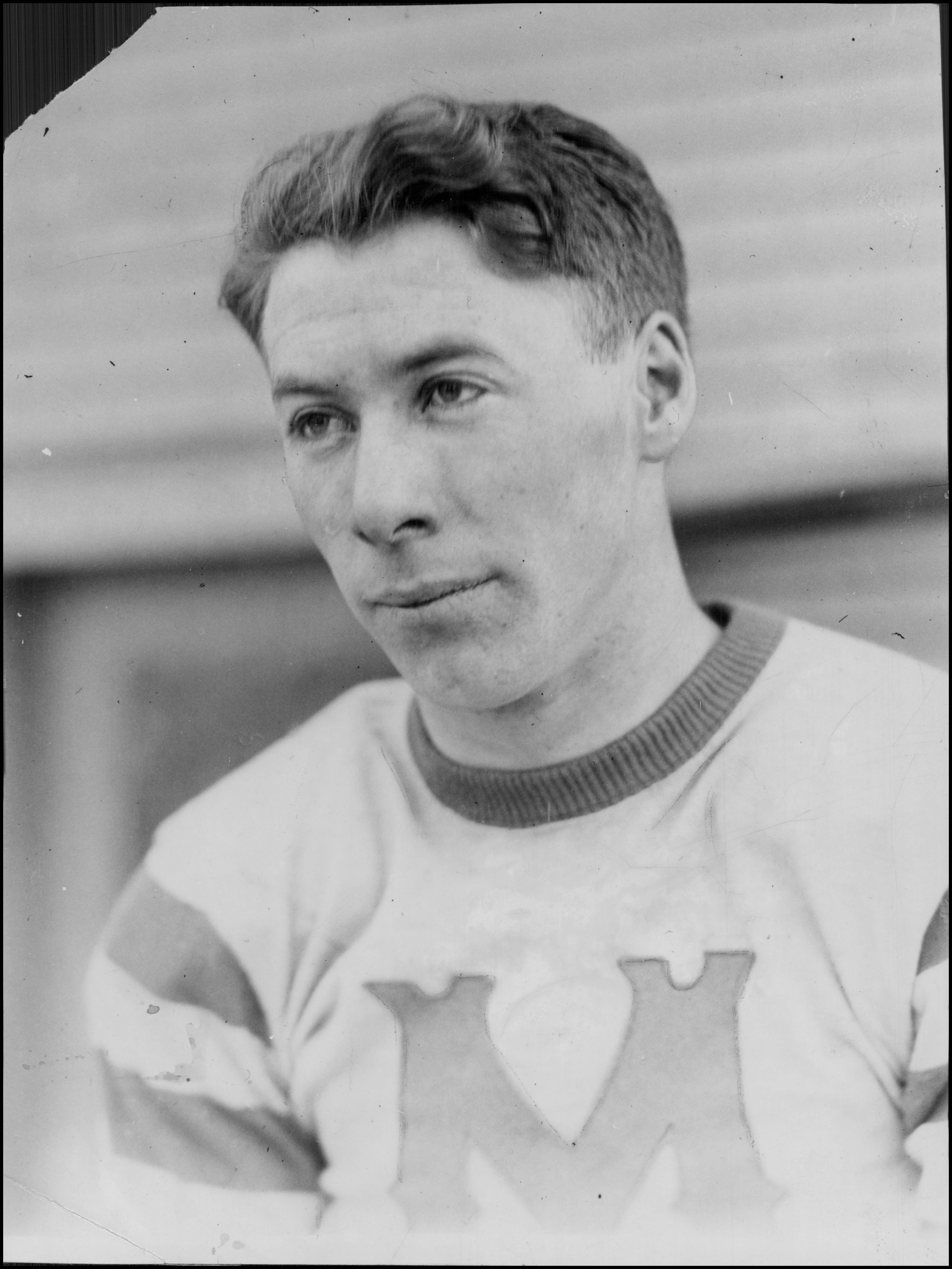
- Born: June 26, 1905 Stittsville, Ontario, Canada
- Died: May 4, 1981 (aged 75) Moose Jaw, Saskatchewan, Canada
- Height: 5 ft 7 in (170 cm)
- Weight: 133 lb (60 kg; 9 st 7 lb)
- Position: Right wing
- Shot: Right
- Played for: Portland Rosebuds; Chicago Black Hawks; Toronto Maple Leafs; Detroit Red Wings
- Playing career: 1925–1939

Kenneth Edward Doraty (June 23, 1905 – May 4, 1981) was a Canadian professional ice hockey player who played in 105 National Hockey League games for the Chicago Black Hawks, Toronto Maple Leafs and the Detroit Red Wings between 1926 and 1938. The rest of his career, which lasted from 1925 to 1939, was spent in various minor leagues.

== Career ==
Doraty began his career in the major league Western Hockey League for the Portland Rosebuds. He made his NHL debut for the Chicago Black Hawks the following season. He then spent the next five seasons in the minor league before returning to the NHL with the Toronto Maple Leafs in 1932.

On April 3, 1933, in the fifth game of a best-of-five semifinal, Doraty scored a goal at 4:46 of the sixth overtime to give Toronto 1–0 victory over the Boston Bruins in a Stanley Cup playoff game. The goal ended what was at the time the longest game (104:46 of overtime) in NHL history, and remains to this day the longest game in either team's history.

On January 16, 1934, Doraty scored a hat-trick in overtime to help the Maple Leafs defeat the Ottawa Senators 7-4, becoming the only player to achieve this unusual feat.

The longest overtime game in NHL history was played three years later, on March 24, 1936, and was won 1–0 by Mud Bruneteau of the Detroit Red Wings on a goal at 116:30 of overtime against the Montreal Maroons. The two games cited above are the only two games to reach a sixth overtime in NHL history. Goalie Lorne Chabot played in both marathons, winning the Doraty game and losing the Bruneteau game.

Doraty's NHL career consisted of five seasons. He scored 15 goals and added 25 assists in regular-season play, and scored seven goals and had two assists in Stanley Cup playoff games.

Doraty served as governor of the Western Canada Junior Hockey League from 1953 to 1956, succeeding Al Pickard.

== Career statistics ==
=== Regular season and playoffs ===
			Regular season					Playoffs
Season	Team	League	GP	G	A	Pts	PIM	GP	G	A	Pts	PIM
1921–22	Rouleau Athletic Club	SAHA	—	—	—	—	—	—	—	—	—	—
1921–22	Rouleau Athletic Club	RCSHL	—	—	—	—	—	—	—	—	—	—
1923–24	Regina Pats	RJrHL	6	5	2	7	0	—	—	—	—	—
1923–24	Regina Pats	M-Cup	—	—	—	—	—	5	3	3	6	0
1924–25	Regina Pats	RJrHL	4	5	4	9	2	—	—	—	—	—
1924–25	Regina Pats	M-Cup	—	—	—	—	—	12	13	7	20	24
1925–26	Portland Rosebuds	WHL	30	4	1	5	4	—	—	—	—	—
1926–27	Chicago Black Hawks	NHL	18	0	0	0	0	—	—	—	—	—
1926–27	Minneapolis Millers	AHA	7	0	0	0	0	—	—	—	—	—
1927–28	Kitchener Millionaires	Can-Pro	39	19	6	25	35	5	2	0	2	6
1928–29	Toronto Millionaires	Can-Pro	39	26	5	31	42	2	1	1	2	2
1929–30	Cleveland Indians	IHL	42	26	16	42	43	6	5	0	5	14
1930–31	Cleveland Indians	IHL	48	25	24	49	43	6	1	4	5	6
1931–32	Cleveland Indians	IHL	48	21	15	36	45	—	—	—	—	—
1932–33	Toronto Maple Leafs	NHL	38	5	11	16	16	9	5	0	5	2
1932–33	Syracuse Stars	IHL	10	5	4	9	14	—	—	—	—	—
1933–34	Toronto Maple Leafs	NHL	34	9	10	19	6	5	2	2	4	0
1933–34	Buffalo Bisons	IHL	4	0	0	0	2	—	—	—	—	—
1934–35	Toronto Maple Leafs	NHL	11	1	4	5	0	1	0	0	0	0
1934–35	Syracuse Stars	IHL	30	12	17	29	37	2	0	1	1	0
1934–35	New Haven Eagles	Can-Am	1	0	0	0	0	—	—	—	—	—
1935–36	Syracuse Stars	IHL	7	1	2	3	4	2	0	2	2	0
1935–36	Cleveland Falcons	IHL	39	27	18	45	38	—	—	—	—	—
1936–37	Cleveland Falcons	IAHL	6	1	2	3	0	—	—	—	—	—
1936–37	Pittsburgh Hornets	IAHL	39	13	13	26	21	5	1	0	1	4
1937–38	Detroit Red Wings	NHL	2	0	1	1	2	—	—	—	—	—
1937–38	Pittsburgh Hornets	IAHL	48	12	17	29	22	2	0	0	0	0
1938–39	Seattle Seahawks	PCHL	48	24	16	40	23	7	1	1	2	6
IHL totals			228	117	96	213	226	16	6	7	13	20
NHL totals			103	15	26	41	24	15	7	2	9	2
