= Stanford Smith =

Canadian ice hockey player (1917–2007)

Stan Smith
- Smith with the New York Rangers, c. 1940
- Born: August 13, 1917 Coal Creek, British Columbia, Canada
- Died: November 16, 2007 (aged 90) Fernie, British Columbia, Canada
- Height: 5 ft 10 in (178 cm)
- Weight: 165 lb (75 kg; 11 st 11 lb)
- Position: Center
- Shot: Left
- Played for: New York Rangers
- Playing career: 1936–1952

George Stanford Smith (August 13, 1917 – November 16, 2007) was a Canadian ice hockey player. He played 9 games in the National Hockey League with the New York Rangers during the 1939–40 and 1940–41 seasons. The rest of his career, which lasted from 1936 to 1950, was spent in various minor leagues. He was born in Coal Creek, British Columbia.

== Playing career ==
He made his debut in the 1939–40 season, making him one of the first NHL players from British Columbia. Smith played his first NHL game in the 1940 Stanley Cup Finals with the New York Rangers, helping them win the Stanley Cup. He qualified to be included on the Cup, but his name was left off by mistake, though the NHL still credits Smith as winning it. The next year he played in eight games regular season games recording three points. He continued playing until 1950 in different minor leagues.

== Later life ==
Stan Smith died in 2007 in Fernie, BC, where he had resided in retirement.

== Career statistics ==
=== Regular season and playoffs ===
			Regular season					Playoffs
Season	Team	League	GP	G	A	Pts	PIM	GP	G	A	Pts	PIM
1936–37	Trail Smoke Eaters	WKHL	—	—	—	—	—	—	—	—	—	—
1937–38	Rossland Miners	WKHL	23	19	17	36	14	—	—	—	—	—
1938–39	New York Rovers	EAHL	53	23	27	50	12	—	—	—	—	—
1939–40	New York Rangers	NHL	1	0	0	0	0	1	0	0	0	0
1939–40	Philadelphia Ramblers	IAHL	53	11	22	33	9	—	—	—	—	—
1940–41	New York Rangers	NHL	8	2	1	3	0	—	—	—	—	—
1940–41	Philadelphia Ramblers	AHL	49	18	22	40	2	—	—	—	—	—
1941–42	Cleveland Barons	AHL	21	9	6	15	0	5	1	2	3	0
1942–43	Calgary Currie Army	ASHL	8	1	3	4	0	2	0	3	3	0
1943–44	Nanaimo Clippers	PCHL	—	—	—	—	—	2	0	2	2	0
1946–47	Minneapolis Millers	USHL	42	15	27	42	0	2	0	0	0	0
1947–48	Minneapolis Millers	USHL	51	17	25	42	2	10	3	5	8	0
1948–49	Minneapolis Millers	USHL	64	18	32	50	0	—	—	—	—	—
1949–50	Minneapolis Millers	USHL	32	1	10	11	2	—	—	—	—	—
1949–50	San Francisco Shamrocks	PCHL	31	2	14	16	2	4	0	0	0	0
USHL totals			189	51	94	145	4	12	3	5	8	0
NHL totals			9	2	1	3	0	1	0	0	0	0
