= Butch Keeling =

Ice hockey player (1905–1984)

- Born: August 10, 1905 Owen Sound, Ontario, Canada
- Died: November 12, 1984 (aged 79) Toronto, Ontario, Canada
- Height: 5 ft 11 in (180 cm)
- Weight: 180 lb (82 kg; 12 st 12 lb)
- Position: Left wing
- Shot: Left
- Played for: Toronto St. Patricks; Toronto Maple Leafs; New York Rangers
- Playing career: 1925–1940

Melville Sydney "Butch" Keeling (August 10, 1905 – November 12, 1984) was a Canadian professional ice hockey player. A left winger, he played 12 National Hockey League seasons with the Toronto St. Patricks/Toronto Maple Leafs and the New York Rangers between 1926 and 1938.

== Playing career ==
Keeling was born in Owen Sound, Ontario and began his hockey career in his hometown, learning the game at Victoria Public School under the tutelage of principal Henry Kelso, for whom Owen Sound's Kelso Beach was named. Several Victoria students, including Keeling, eventually ended up playing for the city's junior club, the Owen Sound Greys. He was a key member of the Greys when they captured their first Memorial Cup as Canadian junior hockey champions in 1924, scoring 37 goals and 46 points in 15 playoff games.

Keeling's pro career began in 1926–27 with the London Panthers of the Canadian Professional Hockey League, although he was quickly elevated to the NHL's Toronto St. Patricks, with whom he had signed as a free agent on September 7, 1926. The St. Pats changed their name to the Maple Leafs later that season. Despite playing in only 30 of Toronto's 44 games, Keeling finished fourth in team scoring with 11 goals and 13 points, right behind fellow Owen Sound native Hap Day.

He repeated that showing in 1927–28, again placing right behind Day, but was traded to the New York Rangers on the eve of the 1928–29 season. He was traded to the New York Rangers on April 16, 1928, in exchange for Alex Gray. Keeling slumped to only six goals and nine points for the Rangers in 1928–29, although he did lead the league in playoff goals and points as the Rangers marched to the Stanley Cup Finals against the Boston Bruins. Boston swept the best-of-three series for its first Stanley Cup win. Among the victorious Bruins was Cooney Weiland, who had starred with Keeling on the 1924 Greys.

Keeling continued to rebound in 1929–30, registering career bests in goals (19) and points (26). Once again, he ended up fourth in team scoring. The Rangers went back to the Cup Finals in 1931–32 against Toronto but were again swept aside. It was another bitter disappointment for Keeling to see even more of his old mates skating off with the Cup.

But he and his new club got revenge in a rematch the following year, on April 13, 1933. Toronto's Maple Leaf Gardens was the site of game four of the 1933 Stanley Cup Final, and the Rangers held a 2–1 lead in the best-of-five series. The contest was scoreless through three periods but was decided at the 7:33 mark of sudden-death overtime. According to an article which appeared in the April 24, 1933 edition of Time magazine,

"Butch Keeling took the puck at a face-off, whipped through the Toronto defense on the left side of the rink, made a pass all the way across the ice of which he later said: 'If I hadn't seen that Bill was there, I would have kept the puck myself.' Bill was Bill Cook, oldest active player on the Rangers, leading scorer of the National League ... (Cook) took the puck without breaking his stride, feinted to bring tall Lorne Chabot away from the Toronto net, then flipped the puck over Chabot's shoulder for the goal that ended the game 1 to 0, the series 3 to 1."

Keeling had finally won the Stanley Cup, but his finest campaign as a professional was still yet to come. In 1936–37 he led the Rangers with a career-high 22 goals (third in the league) and matched his previous career best with 26 points. He was fourth in team scoring for the fifth time (he never did place higher than fourth in any of his NHL seasons) and also posted high-water marks in the playoffs, notching three goals and five points as the Rangers advanced to a fifth and deciding game in the Stanley Cup Finals against the Detroit Red Wings.

He left the NHL after the 1937–38 season and played one year with the Philadelphia Ramblers, a Rangers farm team in the International-American Hockey League. Keeling was also the team's captain. He then became a player-coach with the Kansas City Greyhounds of the American Hockey Association. Keeling later returned to the NHL, spending three seasons as a referee.

During Keeling's NHL career, he played in 526 regular season games, scoring 157 goals and 220 points. He added five goals and 11 points in 26 playoff contests.

He was 79 years old when he died suddenly at his Toronto, Ontario home in 1984. He is buried in Park Lawn Cemetery in that city.

In the 2009 book 100 Ranger Greats, the authors ranked Keeling at No. 45 all-time of the 901 New York Rangers who had played during the team's first 82 seasons.

== Career statistics ==
=== Regular season and playoffs ===
			Regular season					Playoffs
Season	Team	League	GP	G	A	Pts	PIM	GP	G	A	Pts	PIM
1920–21	Owen Sound Greys	OHA	—	—	—	—	—	—	—	—	—	—
1921–22	Owen Sound Greys	OHA	—	—	—	—	—	—	—	—	—	—
1922–23	Owen Sound Greys	OHA	—	—	—	—	—	—	—	—	—	—
1923–24	Owen Sound Greys	OHA	11	24	4	28	—	—	—	—	—	—
1923–24	Owen Sound Greys	M-Cup	—	—	—	—	—	15	37	9	46	—
1924–25	Owen Sound Greys	OHA	16	22	8	308	—	—	—	—	—	—
1924–25	Owen Sound Greys	M-Cup	—	—	—	—	—	9	15	5	20	12
1925–26	London Ravens	OHA Sr	20	14	3	17	18	2	1	1	2	0
1925–26	London Ravens	Al-Cup	—	—	—	—	—	2	1	0	1	0
1926–27	London Panthers	Can-Pro	12	13	1	14	25	—	—	—	—	—
1926–27	Toronto St. Patricks/Maple Leafs	NHL	30	11	2	13	29	—	—	—	—	—
1927–28	Toronto Maple Leafs	NHL	43	10	7	17	52	—	—	—	—	—
1928–29	New York Rangers	NHL	43	6	3	9	39	6	3	0	3	2
1929–30	New York Rangers	NHL	43	19	7	26	34	4	0	3	3	8
1930–31	New York Rangers	NHL	44	13	9	22	35	4	1	1	2	0
1931–32	New York Rangers	NHL	48	17	3	20	38	7	2	1	3	12
1932–33	New York Rangers	NHL	47	8	6	14	22	8	0	2	2	8
1933–34	New York Rangers	NHL	48	15	5	20	20	2	0	0	0	0
1934–35	New York Rangers	NHL	47	15	4	19	14	4	2	1	3	0
1935–36	New York Rangers	NHL	46	13	5	18	22	—	—	—	—	—
1936–37	New York Rangers	NHL	48	22	4	26	24	9	3	2	5	2
1937–38	New York Rangers	NHL	38	8	9	17	12	3	0	1	1	2
1938–39	Philadelphia Ramblers	IAHL	48	6	13	19	16	9	2	1	3	5
1939–40	Kansas City Greyhounds	AHA	46	15	11	26	27	—	—	—	—	—
NHL totals			525	157	64	221	341	47	11	11	22	34
