= Werner Schnarr =

Canadian ice hockey player

- Born: March 23, 1903; Berlin, Ontario, Canada
- Died: May 29, 1959 (aged 56); Guelph, Ontario, Canada
- Height: 5 ft 7 in (170 cm)
- Weight: 145 lb (66 kg; 10 st 5 lb)
- Position: Centre
- Shot: Left
- Played for: Boston Bruins
- Playing career: 1924–1931

Werner Henry Schnarr (March 23, 1903 – May 29, 1959) was a Canadian professional ice hockey centre who played 26 games over two seasons in the National Hockey League for the Boston Bruins between 1924 and 1926. He was born in Berlin, Ontario.

== Later life ==
Werner H. Schnarr died from a heart attack in Guelph, Ontario, on May 31, 1959. He had been traveling in Guelph that day and his body was found in his automobile. Schnarr, an original Boston Bruin, operated a florist shop in Kitchener at the time of his death. His remains were returned for interment in his hometown. Werner was a member of a large hockey-playing family, of which only he made the NHL. In all, there were eight brothers that played the game at varying levels.

== Career statistics ==
=== Regular season and playoffs ===
			Regular season					Playoffs
Season	Team	League	GP	G	A	Pts	PIM	GP	G	A	Pts	PIM
1923–24	Kitchener Greenshirts	OHA Sr	1	0	0	0	0	—	—	—	—	—
1923–24	Kitchener Twin City	OHA Sr	10	10	5	15	—	—	—	—	—	—
1924–25	Boston Bruins	NHL	25	0	0	0	0	—	—	—	—	—
1925–26	Boston Bruins	NHL	1	0	0	0	0	—	—	—	—	—
1926–27	Stratford Nationals	Can-Pro	2	0	0	0	0	—	—	—	—	—
1928–29	Kitchener Flying Dutchmen	Can-Pro	2	0	0	0	0	—	—	—	—	—
1929–30	Guelph Maple Leafs	Can-Pro	27	17	19	36	16	4	3	5	8	8
1930–31	Kitchener Silverwoods	OPHL	30	13	7	20	29	4	2	2	4	0
NHL totals			26	0	0	0	0	—	—	—	—	—
