= Ehrhardt Heller =

Canadian ice hockey defenceman

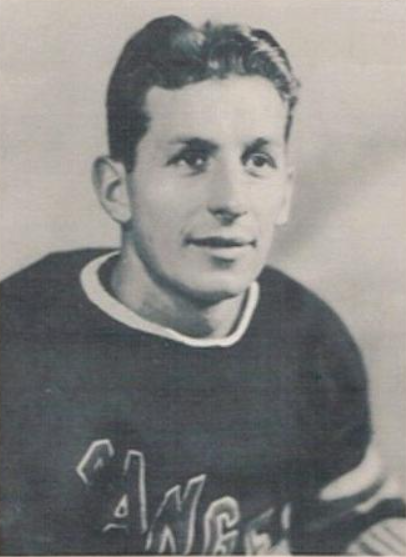
- Born: June 2, 1910 Berlin, Ontario, Canada
- Died: June 15, 1980 (aged 70) Kitchener, Ontario, Canada
- Height: 6 ft 0 in (183 cm)
- Weight: 194 lb (88 kg; 13 st 12 lb)
- Position: Defence
- Shot: Right
- Played for: New York Rangers
- Playing career: 1929–1956

Ehrhardt Henry "Ott" Heller (June 2, 1910 – June 15, 1980) was a Canadian ice hockey defenceman who played in the National Hockey League with the New York Rangers between 1931 and 1946. He won the Stanley Cup twice with the Rangers, in 1933 and 1940. Originally a right wing, Heller learned to play as a defenseman early in his career.

== Career ==
Heller started his National Hockey League career with the New York Rangers in 1931, signing with the team as a free agent on November 2, 1931. He would his entire career with the Rangers and retire after the 1946 season. In 1941, he was a member of the NHL All-Star team. He won the Stanley Cup twice, in 1933 and 1940. He served as Captain of the Rangers from 1942 to 1945.

== Coaching ==
After leaving the Rangers in 1946, Heller had several head coaching stints in the minors, where he often had the dual role of player-coach. He led the Indianapolis Capitals to the Calder Cup as a player-coach during the 1949-50 AHL season, a team that had future Hockey Hall Of Fame goaltender Terry Sawchuk in net for 61 out of a possible 70 games.

Heller finished his career with the Chatham Sr. Maroons in 1956, scoring two assists in seven games.

== Death ==
Heller died on June 15, 1980, in his hometown of Kitchener, less than two weeks after his 70th birthday.

== Legacy ==
In the 2009 book 100 Ranger Greats, the authors ranked Heller at No. 25 all-time of the 901 New York Rangers who had played during the team's first 82 seasons.

== Career statistics ==
=== Regular season and playoffs ===
			Regular season					Playoffs
Season	Team	League	GP	G	A	Pts	PIM	GP	G	A	Pts	PIM
1928–29	Kitchener Empires	OHA	—	—	—	—	—	—	—	—	—	—
1929–30	Springfield Indians	Can-Am	26	6	2	8	32	—	—	—	—	—
1930–31	Springfield Indians	Can-Am	38	16	15	31	85	7	0	2	2	26
1931–32	Springfield Indians	Can-Am	21	7	7	14	30	—	—	—	—	—
1931–32	New York Rangers	NHL	21	2	2	4	9	7	3	1	4	8
1932–33	New York Rangers	NHL	40	5	7	12	31	8	3	0	3	10
1933–34	New York Rangers	NHL	48	2	5	7	29	2	0	0	0	0
1934–35	New York Rangers	NHL	47	3	11	14	31	4	0	1	1	4
1935–36	New York Rangers	NHL	43	2	11	13	40	—	—	—	—	—
1936–37	New York Rangers	NHL	48	5	12	17	42	9	0	0	0	11
1937–38	New York Rangers	NHL	48	2	14	16	68	3	0	1	1	2
1938–39	New York Rangers	NHL	48	0	23	23	42	7	0	1	1	10
1939–40	New York Rangers	NHL	47	5	14	19	26	12	0	3	3	12
1940–41	New York Rangers	NHL	48	2	16	18	42	3	0	1	1	4
1941–42	New York Rangers	NHL	35	6	5	11	22	6	0	0	0	0
1942–43	New York Rangers	NHL	45	4	14	18	14	—	—	—	—	—
1943–44	New York Rangers	NHL	50	8	27	35	29	—	—	—	—	—
1944–45	New York Rangers	NHL	45	7	12	19	26	—	—	—	—	—
1945–46	New York Rangers	NHL	34	2	3	5	14	—	—	—	—	—
1945–46	St. Paul Saints	USHL	16	2	5	7	4	6	0	1	1	4
1946–47	New Haven Ramblers	AHL	64	7	29	36	40	3	0	0	0	6
1947–48	New Haven Ramblers	AHL	67	6	25	31	40	4	1	0	1	6
1948–49	Indianapolis Capitals	AHL	55	6	21	27	24	2	0	0	0	4
1949–50	Indianapolis Capitals	AHL	30	0	1	1	6	4	0	0	0	2
1950–51	Indianapolis Capitals	AHL	48	4	12	16	34	2	0	1	1	2
1951–52	Indianapolis Capitals	AHL	48	4	15	19	40	—	—	—	—	—
1952–53	New Haven Nutmegs	EAHL	21	2	6	8	14	—	—	—	—	—
1952–53	Kitchener Dutchmen	OHA Sr	24	3	10	13	20	—	—	—	—	—
1952–53	Cleveland Barons	AHL	—	—	—	—	—	5	0	0	0	2
1953–54	Marion Barons	IHL	64	4	25	29	70	5	0	2	2	6
1954–55	Valleyfield Braves	QHL	18	0	3	3	4	—	—	—	—	—
1954–55	Cleveland Barons	AHL	6	0	1	1	2	3	0	1	1	4
1954–55	Chatham Maroons	OHA Sr	7	0	2	2	10	—	—	—	—	—
NHL totals			647	55	176	231	465	61	6	8	14	61

== Awards and accomplishments ==
- 1932–33, Stanley Cup champion (New York Rangers)
- 1936–37, Most Penalty Minutes (New York Rangers - tie with Joe Cooper)
- 1938–39, Most Assists (New York Rangers)
- 1939–40, Stanley Cup champion (New York Rangers)
- 1940–41, NHL second All-Star team
- 1942–45, Team Captain (New York Rangers)
- 1946–47, AHL second All-Star team
- 1947–48, AHL first All-Star team
- 1949–50, Calder Cup champion (Indianapolis Capitals)
- 1953–54, IHL second All-Star team

Sporting positions
Preceded by Art Coulter	New York Rangers captain 1942–45	Succeeded by Neil Colville
