= Kitchener Greenshirts =

Several senior and junior ice hockey teams in Kitchener, Ontario

- City: Kitchener, Ontario
- League: Ontario Hockey Association
- Senior A: c.1917 to c.1938
- Junior A: c.1922 to c.1938
- Junior B: c.1939 to c.1949
- Junior A: 1951–1954
- Junior B: c.1963 to c.1978

The Kitchener Greenshirts name has been used by multiple Canadian ice hockey teams playing in Kitchener, Ontario. These include one senior ice hockey team, four junior ice hockey teams, and a team in the Ontario Minor Hockey Association.

== Senior A (c.1917 to c.1938) ==
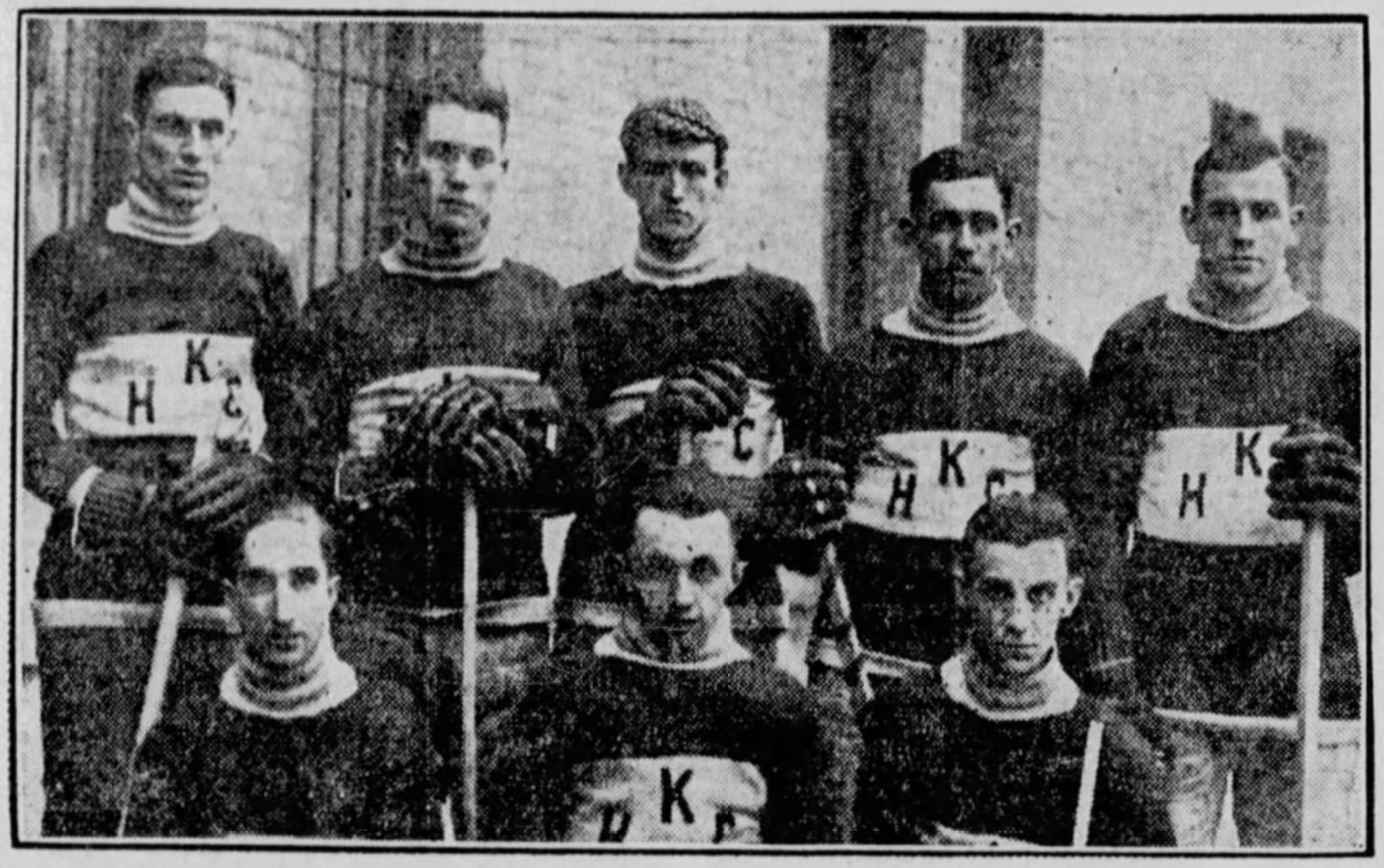
Kitchener Greenshirts in 1917–18.

The Kitchener Hockey Club, commonly known as the Kitchener Greenshirts, were a senior ice hockey team that won the J. Ross Robertson Cup in 1918 and 1928, as champion of the Ontario Hockey Association (OHA). Kitchener also won the 1918 Allan Cup as Canadian champions.

Hockey Hall of Fame goaltender George Hainsworth played for the Greenshirts from 1917 to 1923. Another Hall of Fame inductee, Earl Seibert played one game with the team in 1928.

List of National Hockey League (NHL) alumni:

- Lloyd Gross
- George Hainsworth
- Bingo Kampman
- Howie Mackie
- Red Mitchell
- Ernie Parkes
- Werner Schnarr
- Earl Seibert

== Junior A (c.1922 to c.1938) ==
The first junior ice hockey Greenshirts team played in the OHA the early 1920s to the start of World War II. This Junior A program operated in affiliation to the Senior A team of the same name.

The team was known as the Kitchener Colts when they won the J. Ross Robertson Cup as the OHA junior champions in 1923. The Colts eventually advanced to play the University of Manitoba in a two-game, total-goals series in Toronto to decide the 1923 Memorial Cup winner. The university won consecutive 7–3 contests to capture the Cup by a total score of 14–6.

The team later became the Greenshirts and were finalists for the J. Ross Robertson Cup in 1929. The Greenshirts were awarded the J. Ross Robertson Cup by default in the 1934–35 season after winning a protest on the series it had lost to the Oshawa Generals. The decision on the protest came too late for Kitchener to challenge the Northern Ontario champion Sudbury Cub Wolves in the 1935 Memorial Cup playoffs. The Greenshirts were runners-up in the J. Ross Robertson Cup finals in 1936.

Five future Hockey Hall of Famers played junior hockey for the Greenshirts during this era: Bobby Bauer, Woody Dumart, Milt Schmidt, Earl Seibert, and Babe Siebert.

List of National Hockey League (NHL) alumni:

- Bobby Bauer
- Dick Behling
- Woody Dumart
- Lloyd Gross
- Ott Heller
- Art Herchenratter
- Ron Howell
- Bingo Kampman
- Jack Keating
- Howie Mackie
- George Patterson
- Milt Schmidt
- Earl Seibert
- Babe Siebert

== Junior B (c.1939 to c.1949) ==
With high calibre players involved in military service, Kitchener formed a junior B team.

Future NHLers Howie Meeker and Dutch Reibel played for the junior B Greenshirts during the 1940s. Howie Meeker was inducted into the Hockey Hall of Fame as a broadcaster.

== Minor ice hockey ==
A minor ice hockey team in the Ontario Minor Hockey Association has used the Kitchener Greenshirts name. Its NHL alumni include, Kevin Miehm, Steve Seftel, Brad Schlegel, Paul Reinhart, Brad Shaw and Nick Stajduhar.
