= 1940 Stanley Cup Final =

1940 ice hockey championship series

	1	2	3	4	5	6	Total
New York Rangers	2*	6	1	0	2**	3*	4
Toronto Maple Leafs	1*	2	2	3	1**	2*	2
- * – Denotes overtime period(s)
- Location(s): New York City: Madison Square Garden (1, 2); Toronto: Maple Leaf Gardens (3–6)
- Coaches: New York: Frank Boucher; Toronto: Dick Irvin
- Captains: New York: Art Coulter; Toronto: Red Horner
- Dates: April 2–13, 1940
- Series-winning goal: Bryan Hextall (2:07, OT)
- Hall of Famers: Rangers: Neil Colville (1967); Art Coulter (1974); Bryan Hextall (1969); Lynn Patrick (1980); Babe Pratt (1966); Clint Smith (1991); Maple Leafs: Syl Apps (1961); Turk Broda (1967); Gordie Drillon (1975); Red Horner (1965); Sweeney Schriner (1962); Coaches: Frank Boucher (1958, player); Dick Irvin (1958, player)

The 1940 Stanley Cup Final was a best-of-seven series between the New York Rangers and the Toronto Maple Leafs. New York would win the series 4–2 to win their third Stanley Cup. The Rangers would not win another for 54 years, a circumstance termed the Curse of 1940.

== Paths to the Finals ==
New York defeated the Boston Bruins in a best-of-seven 4–2 to advance to the Finals. The Maple Leafs had to play two best-of three series; winning 2–0 against the Chicago Black Hawks, and 2–0 against the Detroit Red Wings to advance to the Finals.

== Game summaries ==
The Final series between the Rangers and the Maple Leafs was an exciting one that went back and forth with three overtime games. The Rangers took the first two at home and the Leafs took the next two in Toronto. The circus forced the Rangers to vacate Madison Square Garden after the first two games. The Rangers would score three game-winning goals in overtime including the Cup winner. Lynn and Murray Patrick played for the Rangers to become the third and fourth members of the Patrick family to win the Stanley Cup.

April 2	Toronto Maple Leafs	1–2	OT	New York Rangers	Madison Square Garden III	Recap
Red Heron (2) - 11:01		First period		9:09 - pp - Art Coulter (1)
No scoring		Second period		No scoring
No scoring		Third period		No scoring
No scoring		First overtime period		15:30 - Alf Pike (2)
Turk Broda		Goalie stats		Dave Kerr

April 3	Toronto Maple Leafs	2–6	New York Rangers	Madison Square Garden III	Recap
Billy Taylor (1) - 5:01; Hank Goldup (4) - 6:01		First period	15:14 - Bryan Hextall
No scoring		Second period	3:57 - Babe Pratt (3); 19:48 - pp - Bryan Hextall (2)
No scoring		Third period	6:26 - Bryan Hextall (3); 12:21 - pp - Dutch Hiller (2); 13:09 - pp - Lynn Patrick (2)
Turk Broda		Goalie stats	Dave Kerr

April 6	New York Rangers	1–2	Toronto Maple Leafs	Maple Leaf Gardens	Recap
Phil Watson (3) - 18:19		First period	No scoring
No scoring		Second period	No scoring
No scoring		Third period	10:32 - Gordie Drillon (2); 13:40 - Hank Goldup (5)
Dave Kerr		Goalie stats	Turk Broda

April 9	New York Rangers	0–3	Toronto Maple Leafs	Maple Leaf Gardens	Recap
No scoring		First period	19:20 - Gus Marker (1)
No scoring		Second period	No scoring
No scoring		Third period	16:03 - Wally Stanowski (1); 19:26 - Gordie Drillon (3)
Dave Kerr		Goalie stats	Turk Broda

April 11	New York Rangers	2–1	2OT	Toronto Maple Leafs	Maple Leaf Gardens	Recap
Neil Colville (1) - 12:21		First period		No scoring
No scoring		Second period		16:55 - Syl Apps (4)
No scoring		Third period		No scoring
Muzz Patrick (3) - 11:43		Second overtime period		No scoring
Dave Kerr		Goalie stats		Turk Broda

April 13	New York Rangers	3–2	OT	Toronto Maple Leafs	Maple Leaf Gardens	Recap
No scoring		First period		6:52 - Syl Apps (5)
No scoring		Second period		4:51 - Nick Metz (1)
Neil Colville (2) - 8:08; Alf Pike (3) - 10:01		Third period		No scoring
Bryan Hextall (4) - 2:07		First overtime period		No scoring
Dave Kerr		Goalie stats		Turk Broda

New York won series 4–2

== Stanley Cup engraving ==
The 1940 Stanley Cup was presented to Rangers captain Art Coulter by NHL President Frank Calder following the Rangers 3–2 overtime win over the Maple Leafs in game six.

The following Rangers players and staff had their names engraved on the Stanley Cup

1939–40 New York Rangers

=== Players ===
Centres

- 6 Neil Colville
- 7 Phil Watson
- 10 Clint Smith
- 16 Alf Pike
- 17 Stanford Smith^

Wingers

- 4 Alex Shibicky
- 5 Mac Colville
- 8 Wilbert Dutch Hiller
- 9 Lynn Patrick
- 12 Bryan Hextall Sr.
- 14 James Kilby MacDonald

Defencemen

- 2 Art Coulter (Captain)
- 3 Erhardt Ott Heller
- 8 Walter Babe Pratt
- 15 Murray Muzz Patrick

Goaltenders

- 1 Dave Kerr

=== Coaching and administrative staff ===
- John Reed Kilpatrick (President/Owner), Lester Patrick (Manager)
- Frank Boucher (Coach), Harry Westerby (Trainer)
- Stanton Griffis* (Vice President/Owner)

* Missing from the Stanley Cup, but qualified to be on it.

=== Stanley Cup engraving ===
- #17 Stanford Smith^ (C) played in 1 regular-season game and 1 Finals game. Despite playing in the Finals, his name was left off the Stanley Cup engraving.
- Frank Boucher was the 6th NHL rookie coach to win the Stanley Cup.
- Lester Patrick and Frank Boucher became the first (and to this date, the only) duo to win the Stanley Cup together as players and then as a coach-managerial team, having won as players on the Rangers in 1928.
- A new ring was added to the Stanley Cup. This large ring had room to hold 7 winning Stanley Cup teams.

== See also ==
- 1939–40 NHL season

== References and notes ==
=== References ===
- Diamond, Dan (2000). Total Stanley Cup. Toronto: Total Sports Canada. ISBN 978-1-892129-07-9.
- Podnieks, Andrew; Hockey Hall of Fame (2004). Lord Stanley's Cup. Bolton, Ont.: Fenn Pub. pp. 12, 50. ISBN 978-1-55168-261-7.

Preceded by Boston Bruins; 1939	New York Rangers; Stanley Cup champions 1940	Succeeded by Boston Bruins; 1941
