= Murray Murdoch =

Canadian ice hockey player (1904–2001)

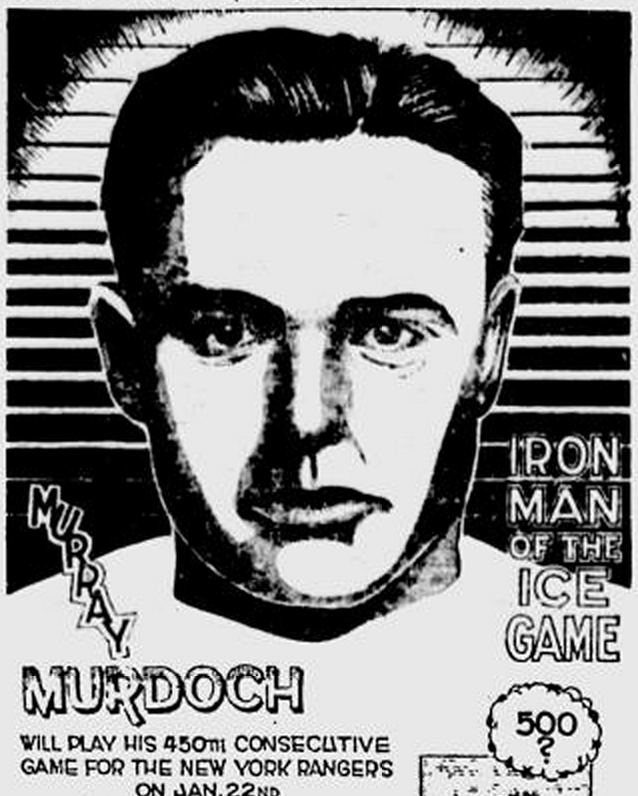
- Murdoch in a 1935 newspaper
- Born: May 19, 1904 Lucknow, Ontario, Canada
- Died: May 17, 2001 (aged 96) Georgetown, South Carolina, U.S.
- Height: 5 ft 10 in (178 cm)
- Weight: 178 lb (81 kg; 12 st 10 lb)
- Position: Left wing
- Shot: Left
- Played for: New York Rangers
- Playing career: 1925–1938

John Murray Murdoch (May 19, 1904 – May 17, 2001) was a Canadian professional ice hockey player and coach. He played for the New York Rangers of the National Hockey League from 1926 to 1937, never missing a game in his career. With the Rangers, Murdoch won the Stanley Cup twice, in 1928 and in 1933. After his playing career, he coached Yale University from 1938 to 1965.

== Personal life ==
Murdoch was born in Lucknow, Ontario and raised in Edgerton, Alberta. His parents were Walter Dryden Murdoch (b. 1875) and Jennie Bell "Jane" Murray (b. 1878). He received a bachelor's degree in mathematics from the University of Manitoba where he played hockey for the Manitoba Bisons from 1921 to 1924. The Bisons won four consecutive Turnbull Cup Provincial Junior Championships, and in 1923, with Murdoch as captain, also won the Abbott Cup (Western Canada), Memorial Cup and Allan Cup for amateur hockey national titles, and were inducted into the Manitoba Sports Hall of Fame and Museum as a team in 2004.

== Hockey career ==
He played left wing for the New York Rangers for 508 games with 84 goals and 108 assists, from the Rangers' first season in the 1926–27 NHL season until the 1936–37 NHL season. From 1938 to 1965, he was the sixth head coach of Yale University's hockey team. In 1974, he was awarded the Lester Patrick Trophy for his contribution to hockey in the United States.

He was the last living player from the inaugural Rangers team in 1925.

== Awards and achievements ==
- Memorial Cup Championship (1923)
- Stanley Cup Championships (1928 & 1933)
- Lester Patrick Trophy Winner (1974)
- Hobey Baker Legends of College Hockey Award (1987)
- Honoured Member of the Manitoba Hockey Hall of Fame
- In the 2009 book 100 Ranger Greats, was ranked No. 39 all-time of the 901 New York Rangers who had played during the team's first 82 seasons

== Family links ==
Murdoch was related to several NHL players. Dave Dryden and Ken Dryden are his first cousins twice removed. Murdoch's parents were Jane Murray and Walter Murdoch (b 1875). Walter's half-sister Maggie Murdoch (1855-1926) married Andrew Dryden (1849-1922). Their great-grandsons are Dave and Ken Dryden.

Mark Messier and Paul Messier are related by marriage through Murdoch's wife, Marie Heinrich. Marie was the daughter of George Heinrich and Ina Dea (d 1936). Ina's brother John Dea (d 1943 in World War II) married Alice Dodd Stiles (1911-1999). John Dea was a grandfather of the Messier brothers.

Billy Dea is also related by marriage. Ina Dea and John Dea's brother Howard Dea is Billy Dea's father and also played professional hockey. Another one of Dea's siblings, Christine, married Murray Murdoch's uncle (his father Walter's brother), Lovell Steele Murdoch (1881-1963) - their children being Murray Murdoch's cousins. Don Murdoch and Bob Murdoch are grandsons of Lovell Steele Murdoch and Christine Dea Murdoch and first cousins once removed of Murray.

== Career statistics ==
=== Regular season and playoffs ===
			Regular season					Playoffs
Season	Team	League	GP	G	A	Pts	PIM	GP	G	A	Pts	PIM
1921–22	University of Manitoba	WJrHL	—	—	—	—	—	—	—	—	—	—
1921–22	University of Manitoba	M-Cup	—	—	—	—	—	2	2	0	2	0
1922–23	University of Manitoba	WJrHL	—	—	—	—	—	—	—	—	—	—
1922–23	University of Manitoba	M-Cup	—	—	—	—	—	8	26	4	30	2
1923–24	University of Manitoba	MHL	8	9	5	14	0	1	0	1	1	0
1924–25	Winnipeg Tiger Falcons	MHL	18	12	2	14	2	—	—	—	—	—
1925–26	Winnipeg Maroons	CHL	34	9	2	11	12	5	0	1	1	0
1926–27	New York Rangers	NHL	44	6	4	10	12	2	0	0	0	0
1927–28	New York Rangers	NHL	44	7	3	10	16	9	2	1	3	12
1928–29	New York Rangers	NHL	44	8	6	14	22	6	0	0	0	2
1929–30	New York Rangers	NHL	44	13	12	25	22	4	3	0	3	6
1930–31	New York Rangers	NHL	44	7	7	14	6	4	0	2	2	0
1931–32	New York Rangers	NHL	48	5	17	22	32	7	0	2	2	2
1932–33	New York Rangers	NHL	48	5	11	16	23	8	3	4	7	2
1933–34	New York Rangers	NHL	48	17	10	27	29	2	0	0	0	0
1934–35	New York Rangers	NHL	48	14	11	25	6	4	0	2	2	4
1935–36	New York Rangers	NHL	48	2	9	11	9	—	—	—	—	—
1936–37	New York Rangers	NHL	48	0	14	14	16	9	1	1	2	0
1937–38	Philadelphia Ramblers	IAHL	44	4	9	13	4	5	0	1	1	4
NHL totals			508	84	104	188	193	55	9	12	21	28

== Head coaching record ==
Record table
Season	Team	Overall	Conference	Standing	Postseason
Yale Bulldogs Independent (1938–1961)
1938–39	Yale	9-10-1			
1939–40	Yale	10-6-4			East Intercollegiate Champion
1940–41	Yale	11-4-2			
1941–42	Yale	13-4-0			
1942–43	Yale	8-5-0			
1943–44	Yale	3-2-0			
1944–45	Yale	2-4-0			
1945–46	Yale	6-2-0			East Intercollegiate co-Champion
1946–47	Yale	15-6-1			
1947–48	Yale	8-11-1			
1948–49	Yale	9-13-0			
1949–50	Yale	12-6-0			
1950–51	Yale	14-2-1			
1951–52	Yale	17-8-0			NCAA Consolation Game (Win)
1952–53	Yale	12-8-0			
1953–54	Yale	11-5-3			
1954–55	Yale	8-12-2			
1955–56	Yale	9-9-0			
1956–57	Yale	10-15-0			
1957–58	Yale	8-12-2			
1958–59	Yale	11-9-1			
1959–60	Yale	10-15-0			
1960–61	Yale	12-12-1			
Yale:		228-180-19			
Yale Bulldogs (ECAC Hockey) (1961–1965)
1961–62	Yale	8-16-0	7-14-0	21st	
1962–63	Yale	12-9-1	11-9-0	11th	
1963–64	Yale	4-18-0	4-16-0	27th	
1964–65	Yale	11-12-0	8-12-0	t-9th	
Yale:		35-55-1	30-51-0		
Total:		263-235-20			
National champion Postseason invitational champion Conference regular season champion Conference regular season and conference tournament champion Division regular season champion Division regular season and conference tournament champion Conference tournament champion

Awards and achievements
Preceded by Amo Bessone	Hobey Baker Legends of College Hockey Award; 1987	Succeeded by Fido Purpur
