= 1924 Memorial Cup =

Canadian junior ice hockey championship

The Memorial Cup trophy

The 1924 Memorial Cup final was the sixth junior ice hockey championship of the Canadian Amateur Hockey Association. The George Richardson Memorial Trophy champions Owen Sound Greys of the Ontario Hockey Association in Eastern Canada competed against the Abbott Cup champions Calgary Canadians of the Calgary City Junior Hockey League in Western Canada. In a two-game, total goal series, held at Shea's Amphitheatre in Winnipeg, Manitoba, Owen Sound won their first Memorial Cup, defeating Calgary 7 goals to 5.

== Background ==
The western Canadian semifinal, final, and Memorial Cup were all held at Shea's Amphitheatre in Winnipeg, as it was the only arena in Canada between Vancouver and Toronto with artificial ice, thus avoiding issues with thawing. The Regina Pats, representing Saskatchewan (their eighth consecutive season as provincial champions), Calgary Canadians from Alberta, and Winnipeg Tammany Tigers from Manitoba competed for the western championship. Regina and Winnipeg played a two game series on March 18 and 20, 1924 to determine who would play Calgary for the western title, in another two game series on March 22 and 24; Regina won the two games 2-0 and 7-2. in the two games against Calgary the games were split with Regina winning game one 4-2 and Calgary game two, also 4-2, so overtime was required, which Calgary won.

From the east, Owen Sound had defeated, in succession, the Kitchener Colts, Kenora Thistles, North Bay Trappers, and Montreal Westmounts.

== Scores ==
The two games were scheduled for March 26 and 28, 1924. Owen Sound won game one 5-3, and with the second game tied 2-2 they won the series on goals, 7-5.

== Winning roster ==
Dutch Cain, George Elliott, Bev Flairity, Ted Graham, Butch Keeling, H. Silverthorne, Headley Smith, Cooney Weiland, Shorty Wright. Coach: E.T. Hicks. Manager: Jim Jamieson
