= Dave Kerr =

Canadian ice hockey player

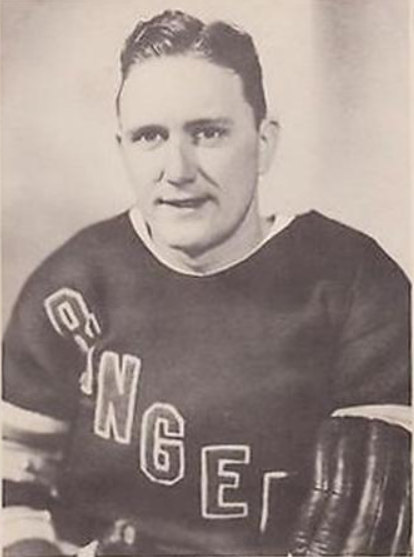
- Kerr with the New York Rangers in 1939
- Born: January 11, 1910 Toronto, Ontario, Canada
- Died: May 11, 1978 (aged 68) Belleville, Ontario, Canada
- Height: 5 ft 10 in (178 cm)
- Weight: 160 lb (73 kg; 11 st 6 lb)
- Position: Goaltender
- Caught: Right
- Played for: Montreal Maroons; New York Americans; New York Rangers
- Playing career: 1930–1941

David Alexander Kerr (January 11, 1910 – May 11, 1978) was a Canadian NHL goaltender who played for the Montreal Maroons, New York Americans and New York Rangers.

== Playing career ==
He played amateur hockey before joining the NHL, winning the Allan Cup in 1930 with the Montreal AAA senior men's team.

Kerr was most notable for his time with the New York Rangers. His four shutouts in a single playoff season in 1937 is a Rangers record (since tied by Mike Richter). In 1937-38, Kerr was selected to the NHL second All-Star team. Kerr won a Stanley Cup with the New York Rangers in 1939-40. That year, he won the Vezina Trophy for a Rangers team that led the league in goals allowed, and had a 19-game unbeaten streak (14-0-5). He was also selected to the NHL first All-Star team that year. As a Ranger, he only missed one game between 1934 and 1941, and started every game for five straight seasons (1936-1941).

Kerr also was the NHL season leader in most games played by a goaltender (1936–37, 1937–38, 1938–39, 1939–40, and 1940–41), most shutouts (1937–38 and 1939–40), most playoff games played by a goaltender, most playoff minutes played by a goaltender, most playoff wins, most playoff shutouts, and lowest playoff goals-against average (all 1937 and 1940).

Kerr was the second hockey player on the cover of Time magazine, doing so on the March 14, 1938 edition.

Kerr was the fifth goalie to win 200 games in a career and retired with the fourth most wins (204) along with 8th in shutouts (51).

Kerr died at the age of 68 on May 11, 1978 in a hospital in Belleville, Ontario after a long illness.

== Awards and achievements ==
- Allan Cup (1930)
- Vezina Trophy (1940)
- NHL first All-Star team goalie (1940)
- NHL second All-Star team goalie (1938)
- Stanley Cup (1940)
- In the 2009 book 100 Ranger Greats, the authors ranked Kerr at No. 19 all-time of the roughly 900 New York Rangers who had played during the first 83 seasons (1926–27 to 2008–09) of the franchise‘s existence.

== Career statistics ==
=== Regular season and playoffs ===
| | | | Regular season | | | | | | | | Playoffs |
| Season | Team | League | GP | W | L | T | Min | GA | SO | GAA | GP | W | L | T | Min | GA | SO | GAA |
|---|---|---|---|---|---|---|---|---|---|---|---|---|---|---|---|---|---|---|
| 1929–30 | Montreal AAA | MCHL | 9 | 8 | 0 | 1 | 540 | 6 | 4 | 0.67 | 2 | 1 | 1 | 0 | 150 | 2 | 1 | 0.80 |
| 1929–30 | Montreal CPR | MCHL | 9 | 3 | 2 | 4 | 540 | 10 | 3 | 1.11 | 2 | 0 | 1 | 0 | 120 | 4 | 0 | 2.00 |
| 1929–30 | Montreal AAA | A-Cup | — | — | — | — | — | — | — | — | 9 | 7 | 0 | 2 | 610 | 5 | 5 | 0.49 |
| 1930–31 | Montreal Maroons | NHL | 29 | 13 | 11 | 4 | 1769 | 70 | 1 | 2.37 | 2 | 0 | 2 | 0 | 120 | 8 | 0 | 4.00 |
| 1931–32 | Windsor Bulldogs | IHL | 34 | 14 | 13 | 7 | 2140 | 68 | 6 | 1.91 | — | — | — | — | — | — | — | — |
| 1931–32 | New York Americans | NHL | 1 | 0 | 1 | 0 | 60 | 6 | 0 | 6.00 | — | — | — | — | — | — | — | — |
| 1932–33 | Montreal Maroons | NHL | 25 | 14 | 8 | 3 | 1520 | 58 | 4 | 2.29 | 2 | 0 | 2 | 0 | 120 | 5 | 0 | 2.50 |
| 1932–33 | Philadelphia Arrows | Can-Am | 16 | 8 | 3 | 5 | 1020 | 31 | 2 | 1.81 | — | — | — | — | — | — | — | — |
| 1933–34 | Montreal Maroons | NHL | 48 | 19 | 18 | 11 | 3060 | 122 | 6 | 2.39 | 4 | 1 | 2 | 1 | 240 | 7 | 1 | 1.75 |
| 1934–35 | New York Rangers | NHL | 37 | 19 | 12 | 6 | 2990 | 94 | 4 | 2.46 | 4 | 1 | 1 | 2 | 240 | 10 | 0 | 2.50 |
| 1935–36 | New York Rangers | NHL | 47 | 18 | 17 | 12 | 2980 | 95 | 8 | 1.91 | — | — | — | — | — | — | — | — |
| 1936–37 | New York Rangers | NHL | 48 | 19 | 20 | 9 | 3020 | 106 | 4 | 2.11 | 9 | 6 | 3 | 0 | 553 | 10 | 4 | 1.08 |
| 1937–38 | New York Rangers | NHL | 48 | 27 | 15 | 6 | 2960 | 96 | 8 | 1.95 | 3 | 1 | 2 | 0 | 262 | 8 | 0 | 1.83 |
| 1938–39 | New York Rangers | NHL | 48 | 26 | 16 | 6 | 2970 | 105 | 6 | 2.12 | 1 | 0 | 1 | 0 | 119 | 2 | 0 | 1.01 |
| 1939–40 | New York Rangers | NHL | 48 | 27 | 11 | 10 | 3000 | 77 | 8 | 1.54 | 12 | 8 | 4 | 0 | 770 | 20 | 3 | 1.56 |
| 1940–41 | New York Rangers | NHL | 48 | 21 | 19 | 8 | 3010 | 125 | 2 | 2.49 | 3 | 1 | 2 | 0 | 192 | 6 | 0 | 1.88 |
| NHL totals | | | 427 | 203 | 148 | 75 | 26,139 | 954 | 51 | 2.15 | 40 | 18 | 19 | 3 | 2616 | 76 | 8 | 1.74 |

| Preceded by Frank Brimsek | Winner of the Vezina Trophy; 1940 | Succeeded by Turk Broda |
