= 1923 Memorial Cup =

Canadian junior ice hockey championship

The Memorial Cup trophy

The 1923 Memorial Cup final was the fifth junior ice hockey championship of the Canadian Amateur Hockey Association. The George Richardson Memorial Trophy champions Kitchener Colts of the Ontario Hockey Association in Eastern Canada competed against the Abbott Cup champions University of Manitoba of the Manitoba Junior Hockey League in Western Canada. In a two-game, total goal series, held at the Arena Gardens in Toronto, Ontario, the University of Manitoba won their first Memorial Cup, defeating Kitchener 14 goals to 6.

== Background ==
The University of Manitoba lost only one game during the season, to the Winnipeg Tammany Tigers in the opening game of the season. They had played a team from Brandon, Manitoba and the Calgary Canadians in order to reach the western final, and then defeated the Fort William Cubs to reach the Memorial Cup. Kitchener had defeated the University of Toronto Varsity Grads and then a team from Iroquois Falls for the Ontario championship, and then beat a team from Montreal for the eastern title.

== Scores ==
The first game was held on March 22, 1923. Manitoba won it 7-3, with their captain Murray Murdoch scoring 4 of the goals. The second game was played on March 26, a 7-3 Manitoba win; Murdoch recorded 5 of the Manitoba goals.

== Winning roster ==
A. Chapman, C.S. Doupe, Nip Johnson, Jack Mitchell, Bob Moulden, Murray Murdoch, Art Puttee, F. Robertson, Blake Watson, Stony Wise, Clare Williams. Coach: Hal Moulden. Manager: R. Bruce.
