= Cecil Dillon =

Canadian ice hockey player

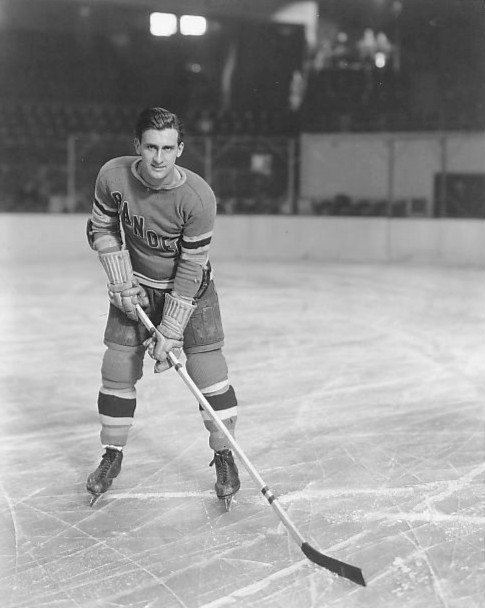
- Dillon with the New York Rangers in 1939
- Born: April 26, 1908 Toledo, Ohio, U.S.
- Died: November 13, 1969 (aged 61) Meaford, Ontario, Canada
- Height: 5 ft 11 in (180 cm)
- Weight: 175 lb (79 kg; 12 st 7 lb)
- Position: Right wing
- Shot: Left
- Played for: New York Rangers; Detroit Red Wings
- Playing career: 1930–1942

Cecil Graham "Ceece" Dillon (April 26, 1908 - November 13, 1969) was an American-Canadian professional ice hockey right winger who played 10 seasons in the National Hockey League (NHL) for the New York Rangers and the Detroit Red Wings. He won the Stanley Cup in 1933 with the New York Rangers against the Toronto Maple Leafs three games to one on April 13, 1933.

== Early life ==
Born in Toledo, Ohio, Dillon was one of the first American-born NHL players as well as being the first person born in Ohio to join the NHL. In 1914, at the age of 6, his family moved from Toledo to Thornbury, Ontario.

== Playing career ==
In 1927, Dillon turned professional. He played one season with the original Owen Sound Greys before playing for the Springfield Indians.

=== New York Rangers ===
For the 1930 season, Dillon was called up to the National Hockey League by the New York Rangers, with whom he would stay until 1939, never missing a single game during his time with the team. A left-handed shooter, Dillon scored 167 goals in total and led the Rangers in scoring during the 1935–36, 1936–37, and 1937–38 seasons averaging about 34 points per season. Dillon played an integral part in the Rangers' Stanley Cup championship in the 1932–33 NHL season. Cecil scored seven goals in his first five games of the postseason, against the Montreal Canadiens, Detroit Red Wings and the first game of the Stanley Cup Finals against the Toronto Maple Leafs. The goal in the first game of the Finals was the game-winner, and he scored his eighth goal of the postseason in game 3, setting a team record, later tied by Vic Hadfield in 1971. Dillon was selected as one of the games' stars for his work in holding the Primeau-Conacher-Jackson "Kid Line" to no goals in the final. Dillon's best season saw him score 25 goals in 48 games in 1934–35. He was a member of the first All-Star team in 1937-38, and the second All-Star team in 1935-36 as well as 1936-37. He played his final game for the New York Rangers on March 19, 1939 against the Toronto Maple Leafs.

=== Detroit Red Wings ===
On May 17, 1939, Dillon was sold to the Detroit Red Wings by the New York Rangers. This would be his final year in the National Hockey League. He played a total of 44 games and scored seven goals and ten assists as a Red Wing.

After the Red Wings, Dillon played another two years in the American Hockey League (AHL) before retiring altogether. In 1940 he played 49 games split between the Indianapolis Capitals and Providence Reds, and then 51 games with the Pittsburgh Hornets in 1941-42, scoring 13 goals along with 23 assists.

== Post-hockey career ==
Going into retirement at the age of 34, Dillon moved back to Thornbury, later moving to Meaford, Ontario. He worked with a telephone company until his death in 1969 at the age of 61.

== Personal life ==
He was married to Bessie Marion Dillion (née Brooks) with whom he had four sons: Keith, William (Bill), Caroll and Garry Matthew Dillon, born on September 25, 1937. Garry died in a car crash on May 19, 1953, at the age of 16, when a friend lost control of their truck on a bridge. Bessie died in 2003 at the age of 94. All three are buried in Thornbury-Clarksburg Union Cemetery.

== Legacy ==
- 1936 through 1938 he led the Rangers in scoring three consecutive years, joining an exclusive club including players like Frank Boucher, Bill Cook, Andy Bathgate, Phil Esposito and Wayne Gretzky as the only players to do so.
- Lester Patrick, the New York Rangers' coach, said that Dillon was "the perfect hockey player". A full-page spread of Dillon ran in the Montreal Gazette in 1933 outlining his talents. Patrick gave him accolades for having minimal penalties and a "deadly close range shot"
- In 1932, Dillon scored the first empty net goal in the history of the NHL against the Boston Bruins
- In the 2009 book 100 Ranger Greats, was ranked No. 33 all-time of the 901 New York Rangers who had played during the team's first 82 seasons

== Career statistics ==
=== Regular season and playoffs ===
			Regular season					Playoffs
Season	Team	League	GP	G	A	Pts	PIM	GP	G	A	Pts	PIM
1927–28	Owen Sound Sr. Greys	OHA-Sr.	—	—	—	—	—	—	—	—	—	—
1928–29	Springfield Indians	Can-Am	33	4	3	7	18	—	—	—	—	—
1929–30	Springfield Indians	Can-Am	39	19	13	32	38	—	—	—	—	—
1930–31	New York Rangers	NHL	25	7	3	10	8	4	0	1	1	2
1931–32	New York Rangers	NHL	48	23	15	38	22	7	2	1	3	4
1932–33	New York Rangers	NHL	48	21	10	31	12	8	8	2	10	6
1933–34	New York Rangers	NHL	48	13	26	39	10	2	0	1	1	2
1934–35	New York Rangers	NHL	48	25	9	34	4	4	2	1	3	0
1935–36	New York Rangers	NHL	48	18	14	32	12	—	—	—	—	—
1936–37	New York Rangers	NHL	48	20	11	31	13	9	0	3	3	0
1937–38	New York Rangers	NHL	48	21	18	39	6	3	1	0	1	0
1938–39	New York Rangers	NHL	48	12	15	27	6	1	0	0	0	0
1939–40	Detroit Red Wings	NHL	44	7	10	17	12	5	1	0	1	0
1940–41	Indianapolis Capitals	AHL	15	1	6	7	2	—	—	—	—	—
1940–41	Providence Reds	AHL	34	8	14	22	2	4	0	0	0	2
1941–42	Pittsburgh Hornets	AHL	51	13	23	36	2	—	—	—	—	—
NHL totals			453	167	131	298	105	43	14	9	23	14
